= Murciélago (manga) =

Japanese manga series

- First tankōbon volume cover, featuring Kuroko Koumori

ムルシエラゴ (Murushierago)
- Genre: Action; Yuri
- Manga
- Written by: Yoshimurakana
- Published by: Square Enix
- English publisher: NA: Yen Press
- Imprint: Young Gangan Comics
- Magazine: Young Gangan
- Original run: August 16, 2013 – present
- Volumes: 29
- Manga

Murciélago Byproduct Araña
- Written by: Yoshimurakana
- Illustrated by: Shin Arakawa
- Published by: Square Enix
- Imprint: Young Gangan Comics
- Magazine: Manga Up!
- Original run: January 12, 2018 – June 26, 2020
- Volumes: 5
- Anime television series
- Directed by: Takashi Naoya (chief); Matsuo Asami
- Written by: Takashi Naoya
- Music by: Masanori Akita; Yūichi Tsuchiya
- Studio: Satelight; Staple Entertainment
- Licensed by: Sentai Filmworks
- Original network: Tokyo MX, Kansai TV, BS11
- Original run: January 2027 – scheduled
- icon

Murciélago (ムルシエラゴ, Murushierago; Spanish for "bat") (Note: Stylized in all caps when written in Latin script) is a Japanese manga series written and illustrated by Yoshimurakana. It began serialization in Square Enix's seinen manga magazine Young Gangan in August 2013. An anime television series adaptation produced by Satelight and Staple Entertainment is set to premiere in January 2027.

== Synopsis ==
Serial killer Kuroko Koumori is originally on death row after killing 715 people since childhood. However, since her hometown is overrun with crime, the government indefinitely stays her execution in exchange for her cooperation in hunting down and killing criminals the police fail to apprehend, to which Kuroko agrees. She is accompanied by Hinako Tozakura, a driving expert; and Chiyo Yanaoka, daughter of a notorious yakuza boss.

== Characters ==
Kuroko Koumori (紅守 黒子, Kōmori Kuroko)
Voiced by: Hitomi Ueda
Hinako Tozakura (屠桜 ひな子, Tozakura Hinako)
Voiced by: Minori Suzuki
Chiyo Yanaoka (柳岡 千代, Yanaoka Chiyo)
Voiced by: Sumire Uesaka

== Media ==
=== Manga ===
Written and illustrated by Yoshimurakana, Murciélago began serialization in Square Enix's seinen manga magazine Young Gangan on August 16, 2013. The series' chapters have been compiled into twenty-nine tankōbon volumes as of July 2026.

During their Anime Expo 2016 panel, Yen Press announced that they licensed the series for English publication.

A spin-off manga focusing on the character Reiko Kuchiba, titled Murciélago Byproduct Araña and illustrated by Shin Arakawa, was serialized on Square Enix's Manga Up! app from January 12, 2018, to June 26, 2020. The spin-off's chapters were compiled into five volumes from June 25, 2018, to July 22, 2020.

==== Volumes ====
No.	Original release date	Original ISBN	North American release date	North American ISBN
1	April 25, 2014	978-4-7575-4290-7	January 24, 2017	978-0-316-50460-7
1. "The Price of Power 1"; 2. "The Price of Power 2"; 3. "The Bad Day"; 4. "Murder Party 1"; 5. "Murder Party 2"; Pilot film; Bonus
2	April 25, 2014	978-4-7575-4291-4	May 30, 2017	978-0-316-47164-0
6. "Murder Party 3"; 7. "Murder Party 4"; 8. "Murder Party 5"; 9. "Murder Party 6"; 10. "Murder Party 7"; 11. "The Great Detective Hinako"; 12. "D.K. ~ Domestic Killer ~"; Bonus
3	September 25, 2014	978-4-7575-4425-3	August 22, 2017	978-0-316-47318-7
13. "D.K. ~Domestic Killer~ 2"; 14. "D.K. ~Domestic Killer~ 3"; 15. "D.K. ~Domestic Killer~ 4"; 16. "D.K. ~Domestic Killer~ 5"; 17. "D.K. ~Domestic Killer~ 6"; 18. "'Black' Intent"; 19. "Rose-Colored Prison"; Bonus
4	February 25, 2015	978-4-7575-4564-9	November 7, 2017	978-0-316-47319-4
20. "Rose-Colored Prison 2"; 21. "Rose-Colored Prison 3"; 22. "Rose-Colored Prison 4"; 23. "Rose-Colored Prison 5"; 24. "Rose-Colored Prison 6"; 25. "Rose-Colored Prison 7"; 26. "Rose-Colored Prison 8"; 27. "No (tear) drop"; Bonus
5	July 25, 2015	978-4-7575-4701-8	January 30, 2018	978-0-316-47320-0
28. "Between Sora and Me"; 29. "Between Sora and Me 2"; 30. "Between Sora and Me 3"; 31. "Between Sora and Me 4"; 32. "Between Sora and Me 5"; 33. "Between Sora and Me 6"; 34. "The Spider"; Bonus
6	November 25, 2015	978-4-7575-4808-4	April 24, 2018	978-0-316-47321-7
35. "School Destruction 1"; 36. "School Destruction 2"; 37. "School Destruction 3"; 38. "School Destruction 4"; 39. "School Destruction 5"; 40. "School Destruction 6"; 41. "School Destruction 7"; Bonus
7	March 25, 2016	978-4-7575-4923-4	July 24, 2018	978-0-316-47323-1
42. "Every Day Is Hinako Day!!"; 43. ""Sakura" of Oblivion 1"; 44. ""Sakura" of Oblivion 2"; 45. ""Sakura" of Oblivion 3"; 46. ""Sakura" of Oblivion 4"; 47. ""Sakura" of Oblivion 5"; 48. ""Sakura" of Oblivion 6"; Bonus
8	August 25, 2016	978-4-7575-5085-8	October 30, 2018	978-1-9753-0247-4
49. ""Sakura" of Oblivion 7"; 50. ""Sakura" of Oblivion 8"; 51. ""Sakura" of Oblivion 9"; 52. ""Sakura" of Oblivion 10"; 53. ""Sakura" of Oblivion 11"; 54. ""Sakura" of Oblivion 12"; 55. ""Sakura" of Oblivion 13"; Bonus
9	January 25, 2017	978-4-7575-5225-8	January 22, 2019	978-1-9753-0248-1
56. ""Sakura" of Oblivion 14"; 57. ""Sakura" of Oblivion 15"; 58. "It's Probably Not Love"; 59. "White Meteor 1"; 60. "White Meteor 2"; 61. "White Meteor 3"; 62. "White Meteor 4"; Bonus Story: "Grimms Notes × Murciélago"
10	July 25, 2017	978-4-7575-5430-6	April 30, 2019	978-1-9753-0249-8
63. "The Deep One 1"; 64. "The Deep One 2"; 65. "The Deep One 3"; 66. "The Deep One 4"; 67. "The Deep One 5"; 68. "The Deep One 6"; 69. "The Deep One 7"; Bonus
11	December 25, 2017	978-4-7575-5561-7	August 6, 2019	978-1-9753-0250-4
70. "The Deep One 8"; 71. "The Deep One 9"; 72. "The Deep One 10"; 73. "Research Subject"; 74. "Master Swordsman 1"; 75. "Master Swordsman 2"; 76. "Master Swordsman 3"; Bonus
12	June 25, 2018	978-4-7575-5760-4	November 12, 2019	978-1-9753-3202-0
77. "Master Swordsman 4"; 78. "Master Swordsman 5"; 79. "Master Swordsman 6"; 80. "Master Swordsman 7"; 81. "Master Swordsman 8"; 82. "Master Swordsman 9"; 83. "Master Swordsman 10"; Bonus
13	January 25, 2019	978-4-7575-5958-5	January 28, 2020	978-1-9753-3205-1
84. "Master Swordsman 11"; 85. "Master Swordsman 12"; 86. "Master Swordsman 13"; 87. "Coffin"; 88. "Signs of Life"; 89. "Till Death Do Us Part 1"; 90. "Till Death Do Us Part 2"; Bonus
14	March 25, 2019	978-4-7575-6070-3	May 5, 2020	978-1-9753-0793-6
91. "Till Death Do Us Part 3"; 92. "Till Death Do Us Part 4"; 93. "Till Death Do Us Part 5"; 94. "Till Death Do Us Part 6"; 95. "Till Death Do Us Part 7"; 96. "Till Death Do Us Part 8"; 97. "Till Death Do Us Part 9"; Bonus
15	July 25, 2019	978-4-7575-6211-0	August 25, 2020	978-1-9753-0897-1
98. "Forbidden Play"; 99. "The Entertainer 1"; 100. "The Entertainer 2"; 101. "The Entertainer 3"; 102. "The Entertainer 4"; 103. "The Entertainer 5"; 104. "The Entertainer 6"; Bonus
16	January 23, 2020	978-4-7575-6478-7	December 1, 2020	978-1-9753-1672-3
105. "The Entertainer 7"; 106. "The Entertainer 8"; 107. "The Entertainer 9"; 108. "The Entertainer 10"; 109. "The Entertainer 11"; 110. "The Entertainer 12"; 111. "Porcupinefish"; Bonus
17	July 22, 2020	978-4-7575-6763-4	December 21, 2021	978-1-9753-3579-3
112. "Porcupinefish 2"; 113. "Porcupinefish 3"; 114. "The Magic-Bullet Archer 1"; 115. "The Magic-Bullet Archer 2"; 116. "The Magic-Bullet Archer 3"; 117. "The Magic-Bullet Archer 4"; 118. "The Magic-Bullet Archer 5"; Bonus
18	December 24, 2020	978-4-7575-7011-5	January 18, 2022	978-1-9753-3641-7
119. "The Magic-Bullet Archer 6"; 120. "Chiyo's Verdict"; 121. "Punishing Love 1"; 122. "Punishing Love 2"; 123. "Punishing Love 3"; 124. "Punishing Love 4"; 125. "Punishing Love 5"; Bonus
19	May 25, 2021	978-4-7575-7268-3	May 24, 2022	978-1-9753-4433-7
126. "Punishing Love 6"; 127. "Punishing Love 7"; 128. "Punishing Love 8"; 129. "Punishing Love 9"; 130. "Punishing Love 10"; 131. "Punishing Love 11"; 132. "The Yamatsukami Family 1"; Bonus
20	October 25, 2021	978-4-7575-7538-7	November 22, 2022	978-1-9753-4970-7
133. "The Yamatsukami Family 2"; 134. "The Yamatsukami Family 3"; 135. "The Yamatsukami Family 4"; 136. "The Yamatsukami Family 5"; 137. "The Yamatsukami Family 6"; 138. "The Yamatsukami Family 7"; 139. "The Yamatsukami Family 8"; Bonus; Ilustration Gallery Celebrating Volume 20!
21	March 25, 2022	978-4-7575-7835-7	May 23, 2023	978-1-9753-6485-4
140. "The Yamatsukami Family 9"; 141. "The Yamatsukami Family 10"; 142. "The Yamatsukami Family 11"; 143. "The Yamatsukami Family 12"; 144. "The Yamatsukami Family 13"; 145. "The Yamatsukami Family 14"; 146. "Silver Scent 1"; Bonus
22	August 25, 2022	978-4-7575-8087-9	October 17, 2023	978-1-9753-6487-8
147. "Silver Scent 2"; 148. "Silver Scent 3"; 149. "Silver Scent 4"; 150. "Silver Scent 5"; 151. "Silver Scent 6"; 152. "Silver Scent 7"; 153. "Silver Scent 8"; Bonus
23	April 25, 2023	978-4-7575-8534-8	February 27, 2024	978-1-9753-7914-8
154. "Silver Scent 9"; 155. "Silver Scent 10"; 156. "Silver Scent 11"; 157. "Silver Scent 12"; 158. "Silver Scent 13"; 159. "Silver Scent 14"; 160. "Silver Scent 15"; Bonus
24	November 25, 2023	978-4-7575-8911-7	September 17, 2024	978-1-9753-9864-4
161. "Silver Scent 16"; 162. "Silver Scent 17"; 163. "Silver Scent ~ Fragment 1"; 164. "Silver Scent ~ Fragment 2"; 165. "Silver Scent 18"; 166. "Silver Scent 19"; 167. "Silver Scent 20"; Bonus
25	June 25, 2024	978-4-7575-9269-8	September 9, 2025	979-8-8554-1466-0
168. "The Source of "Sakura" 1 " 169. "The Source of "Sakura" 2 " 170. "The Source of "Sakura" 3 " 171. "The Source of "Sakura" 4 "; 172. "The Source of "Sakura" 5 " 173. "The Source of "Sakura" 6 " 174. "The Eighth Sin"
26	February 25, 2025	978-4-7575-9688-7	February 24, 2026	979-8-8554-2463-8
175. "The Eighth Sin 2"; 176. "The Eighth Sin 3"; 177. "The Eighth Sin 4"; 178. "The Eighth Sin 5"; 179. "Eyes To Me"; 180. "And Legendary"; 181. "Eternal Life"; Bonus
27	August 25, 2025	978-4-301-00021-1	September 22, 2026	979-8-8554-3608-2
182. "Eternal Life 2"; 183. "Eternal Life 3"; 184. "Eternal Life 4"; 185. "Eternal Life 5"; 186. "Eternal Life 6"; 187. "Eternal Life 7"; 188. "Eternal Life 8"
28	January 23, 2026	978-4-301-00291-8	—	—
29	July 24, 2026	978-4-3010-0650-3	—	—

==== Murciélago Byproduct Araña ====
No.	Release date	ISBN
1	June 25, 2018	978-4-7575-5761-1
2	January 25, 2019	978-4-7575-5959-2
3	July 25, 2019	978-4-7575-6212-7
4	January 23, 2020	978-4-7575-6479-4
5	July 22, 2020	978-4-7575-6764-1

=== Anime ===
An anime television series adaptation was announced during NBCUniversal Entertainment Japan's panel at Anime Expo in July 2026. The series will be produced by Satelight and Staple Entertainment and directed by Matsuo Asami, with Takashi Naoya serving as chief director and handling series composition, Kiyoshi Tateishi designing the characters, and Masanori Akita and Yuichi Tsuchiya composing the music. It is set to premiere in January 2027 on Tokyo MX and other networks. Sentai Filmworks has licensed the series in North America for streaming on Hidive.

=== Other ===
The series has had collaborations with gravure idol Hikaru Aoyama, cosplayers Nekomu Otogi and Hina Takane, and the manga series Caterpillar by Shinya Murata and Tokisada Hayami, and Trash by Kenji Yamamoto and DP.

A motion comic featuring the voice of Romi Park was released on the website ENSOKU on July 3, 2015.

== Reception ==
The series was recommended by novelist Yusuke Kishi.
