= Staple Entertainment =

Japanese animation studio

Staple Entertainment Co., Ltd.
- Native name: Staple Entertainment株式会社
- Romanized name: Suteipuru Entateinmento Kabushiki-gaisha
- Type: Kabushiki-gaisha
- Industry: Japanese animation
- Predecessor: Hoods Entertainment
- Founded: February 2020; 6 years ago
- Headquarters: Kamiogi, Suginami, Tokyo, Japan
- Key people: Shinya Ueda (CEO)
- Revenue: ¥200,000,000
- Total equity: ¥5,000,000
- Number of employees: 20 (As of February 2024)
- Website: www.staple-e.co.jp

Staple Entertainment Co., Ltd. (Japanese: Staple Entertainment株式会社, Hepburn: Kabushiki-gaisha Suteipuru Entateinmento) is a Japanese animation studio based in Suginami, Tokyo founded in 2020.

== History ==
The studio was founded in February 2020 by Shinya Ueda, who was a former producer from Eight Bit and Hoods Entertainment. It is located in the same address as Hoods Entertainment in which the studio took over.

== Works ==
=== Television series ===
Title	Director(s)	First run start date	First run end date	Eps	Note(s)	Ref(s)
3 Seconds Later, He Turned Into a Beast	Ryo Nakamura	April 4, 2022	June 6, 2022	8	Based on a manga by Coa Momose.	
Vermeil in Gold	Takashi Naoya	July 5, 2022	September 20, 2022	12	Based on a manga by Kōta Amana.	
Am I Actually the Strongest?	Takashi Naoya	July 2, 2023	October 1, 2023	12	Based on a light novel by Sai Sumimori.	
Tales of Wedding Rings	Takashi Naoya	January 6, 2024	March 23, 2024	12	Based on a manga by Maybe.	
Übel Blatt	Takashi Naoya	January 11, 2025	March 29, 2025	12	Based on a manga by Etorouji Shiono. Co-produced with Satelight.	
Watari-kun's ****** Is About to Collapse	Takashi Naoya	July 5, 2025	December 27, 2025	26	Based on a manga by Naru Narumi.	
Tales of Wedding Rings (season 2)	Takashi Naoya	October 4, 2025	December 27, 2025	13	Sequel to Tales of Wedding Rings.	
Murciélago	Takashi Naoya; Matsuo Asami	January 2027	TBA	TBA	Based on a manga by Yoshimurakana. Co-produced with Satelight.	
