= Gold Ship (Umamusume: Pretty Derby) =

Umamusume: Pretty Derby character

- Umamusume: Pretty Derby character
- Gold Ship, as she appears in the video game World Flipper
- Based on: Gold Ship
- Voiced by: Hitomi Ueda

In-universe information
- Nationality: Japanese

Gold Ship (Japanese: ゴールドシップ, Hepburn: Gōrudo Shippu), also known by the shorthand Golshi (ゴルシ, Gorushi), is a character from the multimedia franchise Umamusume: Pretty Derby. She is a temperamental racer who is prone to violence, laziness, and irritability, particularly her inclination to attack the player when she wins. Regardless of training, she may do very well or very poorly depending on her mood. Gold Ship is based on the horse of the same name, who was similarly temperamental, notably causing 12 billion yen in lost bets due to getting upset in the starting gate and starting late in the 2015 Takarazuka Kinen race.

Gold Ship appears in various media, including an anime adaptation of the game, a manga depicting her as a kindergartner, and various collaborations with other games. She is also featured on the YouTube channel PakaTube, making her VTuber debut in March 2018. Across various media, Gold Ship is voiced by Hitomi Ueda. She is also featured in various merchandise, including figures and a cross-promotion with both FamilyMart and KFC.

Gold Ship is considered the most popular character in Umamusume, being the second most-searched Internet term behind Umamusume itself according to NicoNico Douga. She was recognized as the best character of 2022, and Ueda the best voice actor of that same year in that year's Famitsu Dengeki Awards. Her violence and tendency to be lazy is considered to be a factor in why she is so popular.

== Concept and creation ==
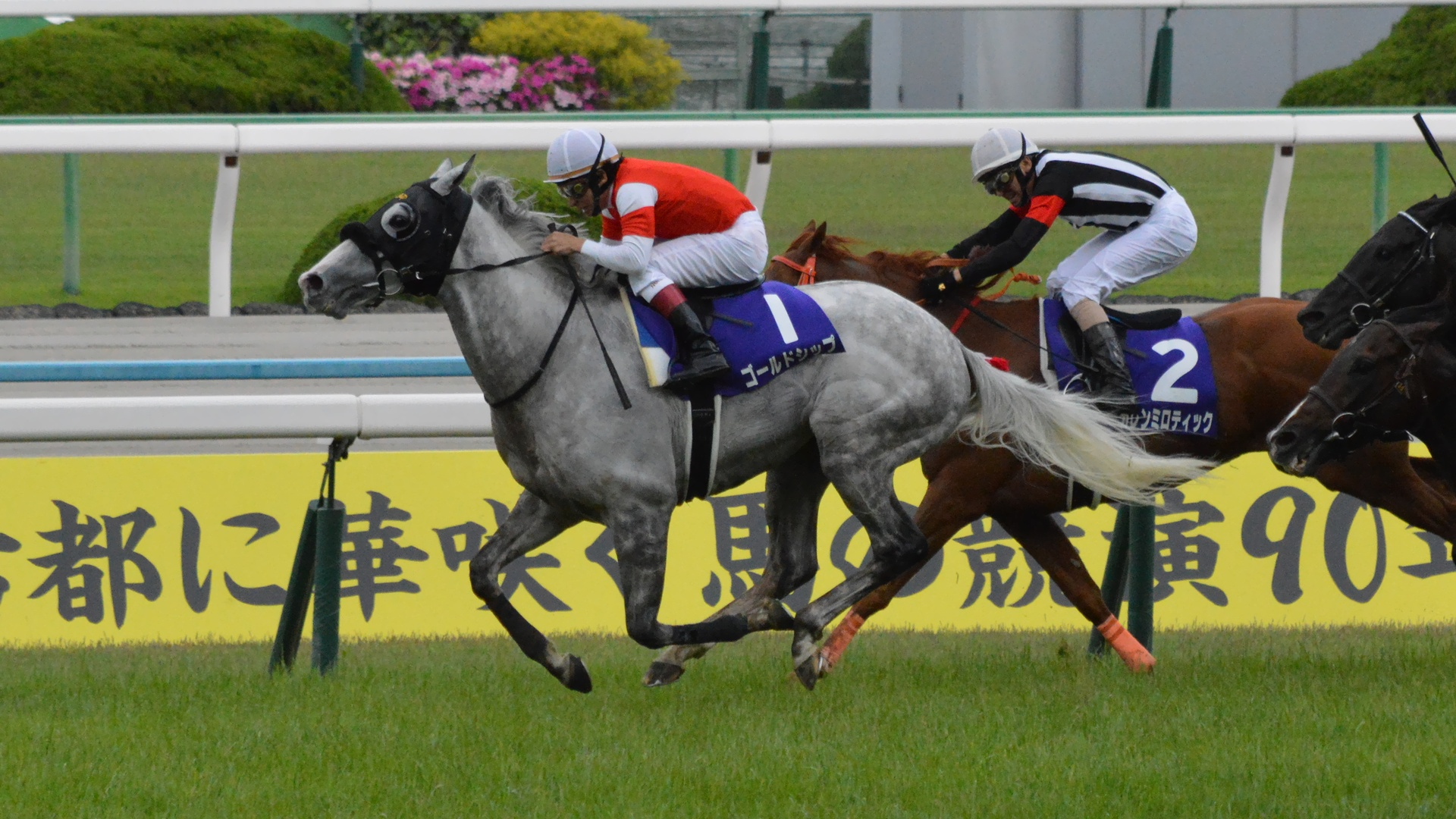
Gold Ship is based on the horse of the same name, sharing the horse's temperament

Gold Ship is depicted as a lean girl with silver hair and a fickle, whimsical personality, often forgoing training to cause mischief or pursue odd hobbies. She is also unpredictable and violent, such as when she dropkicks her trainer upon winning a G1 race. Despite her wild nature, Gold Ship is stated to be rather intelligent, and occasionally shows a gentler and more emotionally mature side to her friends. During races, she may choose to stay at the back of the pack, and will accelerate to victory if she wants to win, which is in line with the real-world horse of the same name, whom she is based on. The real Gold Ship was unpredictable, described as a "divine punishment" on people betting on horse racing due to his tendency to either win by a landslide or lose miserably. His most notable loss was at the 2015 Takarazuka Kinen race, where he grew irritable and reared up at another horse in the starting gate, causing him to start five seconds later than the rest of the pack. This ended up costing 12 billion yen in losses from betting, and he was retired to live at the Big Red Farm in Hokkaido.

Gold Ship is voiced by Hitomi Ueda in Japanese across her various appearances.

== Appearances ==
Gold Ship is one of multiple characters that the player can train in Umamusume: Pretty Derby, with the goal of helping her win races. In her story, she explains that her motivations for allowing the player to be her trainer was due to the player seemingly having a lot of free time. She has received multiple costumes in Umamusume: Pretty Derby, giving her new outfits like a black one-shoulder dress and a swimsuit.

A YouTube channel called PakaTube was created, featuring Gold Ship doing various challenges, such as playing video games. She made her VTuber debut on this YouTube channel in March 2018, and performed at VTuber Fes Japan 2022. Following the channel hitting 1 million subscribers, Gold Ship performed a dance with the 1 million subscribers gold YouTube Creator Award. A set of 24 Line stickers based on Gold Ship and the YouTube channel were released.

Gold Ship has appeared in multiple other video games, including World Flipper, Shadowverse, and Granblue Fantasy Versus. She appeared to be absent initially from the Shadowverse collaboration, which earned confusion from fans who felt that she was the one to spark the collaboration between the games by playing it on her YouTube channel. On her YouTube channel, she confronted the producer, where he revealed that she would be included.

Gold Ship stars in a manga titled Umamusume - Pretty Derby PisuPisu☆SupiSupi - Golshi-chan, depicting Gold Ship's life as a kindergartner, which released in November 2023 in Weekly CoroCoro Comic. Following the reveal of this manga series, she became the subject of art tributes by multiple CoroCoro contributors and guests, including Matsumoto Shigenobu (Duel Masters), Mugiwara Shintaro (Dorabase), and Soyama Kazutoshi (Grandpa Danger). In one short on the PakaTube channel, a collaboration with the manga Uma Musume: Cinderella Gray has Gold Ship shown in the manga's style, with the series name being 'Cinderella Gold'. The third season of the main Umamusume anime features a scene of Gold Ship losing a race due to losing her temper in the starting gate, a scene based on the 2015 incident involving the real Gold Ship, and covers their subsequent retirement.

Gold Ship has been featured in various merchandise and cross-promotions, including a plush and as part of a series of square and round seals. She received a Nendoroid figure from Good Smile, a figure from F:NEX, and a Figma figure. She has been featured in multiple food promotions, including KFC where she is depicted similarly to Colonel Sanders. She was also featured as part of a set of acrylic figures in this same depiction. She also received merchandise, such as pins, in collaboration with Nishi-Shiroi Station and Umamusume. A collaboration between FamilyMart and Umamusume to create food with the series' branding, including one item called "Gold Ship's Omori Sauce Yakisoba Karashi & Mayonnaise".

== Reception ==
Gold Ship has received generally positive reception, recognized as the most popular character in Umamusume by multiple critics. In 2021, the operators of Nico Nico Douga held their annual evaluation of the top 100 Internet terms. Gold Ship ranked as the #2 Internet term of that year, behind Umamusume at #1 and ahead of the real-life Gold Ship at #5. In the 2022 Famitsu Dengeki Awards, she was awarded Best Character, and her voice actress was awarded Best Voice Actor, based on votes by readers, developers, and voice actors. Inside Games staff stated that the key to her appeal is her volatile nature, calling the dialogue with the player "unexpected and impactful".

Game Watch writer Norihiko Ike felt that Gold Ship stood out among the cast, stating that her violent nature made them curious whether such a horse existed in real life. They felt that her eccentricities, like her violence and unpredictability, helped her be particularly interesting, and that it was interesting that her ending was as silly as the rest of the story, making her feel like a mysterious character. The fact that she will sometimes refuse to train also contributed to her charm in Ike's eyes. Futabanet writer Shinsuke Souya also noted her "outrageous" personality and behavior, stating that she was among the most eccentric characters in the game and that her traits are further emphasized by Gold Ship being beautiful and taller than other characters. Her traits have led to her being popular with fans, and Souya felt that her role on the brand's YouTube channel resulted in "unexpected media exposure". She was featured as part of a promotional art piece for the anniversary of the Kereta Api Indonesia, alongside select other fictional characters. A writer for Magmix felt that her hair complemented her eyes, praising her "free-spirited personality" as being a faithful recreation of the real-life racehorse.
