= Übel Blatt =

Japanese fantasy drama manga series

- Cover of Übel Blatt volume 0, featuring Köinzell

ユーベルブラット (Yūberu Buratto)
- Genre: Dark fantasy
- Manga
- Written by: Etorouji Shiono
- Published by: Square Enix
- English publisher: NA: Yen Press
- Magazine: Gangan YG; (2004); Young Gangan; (2004–2009); Monthly Big Gangan; (2011–2019)
- Original run: December 3, 2004 – March 25, 2019
- Volumes: 24
- Manga

Übel Blatt II: Knights of the Fallen King
- Written by: Etorouji Shiono
- Published by: Square Enix
- English publisher: NA: Square Enix (digital) Yen Press
- Magazine: Monthly Big Gangan
- Original run: February 24, 2024 – present
- Volumes: 4
- Anime television series
- Directed by: Takashi Naoya; Matsuo Asami (assistant)
- Written by: Tatsuya Takahashi; Tetsuya Yamada
- Music by: Shun Narita
- Studio: Satelight; Staple Entertainment
- Licensed by: Amazon Prime Video
- Original network: Tokyo MX, BS NTV, Kansai TV, AT-X
- Original run: January 11, 2025 – March 29, 2025
- Episodes: 12

Übel Blatt (ユーベルブラット, Yūberu Buratto) is a Japanese manga series written and illustrated by Etorouji Shiono. It was serialized in the semi-monthly seinen manga magazine Young Gangan from December 2004 to 2009, when it was transferred to Monthly Big Gangan where it continued until its end in March 2019. Its chapters were collected in 24 tankōbon volumes by Square Enix. The story of Übel Blatt takes place in a medieval, fantasy-like landscape. It follows Köinzell, who is on a quest of revenge against those who betrayed and killed him twenty years ago.

A side story titled Übel Blatt Gaiden was published in Young Gangan Big in August 2011. Yen Press began releasing Übel Blatt in North America in October 2014.

A sequel manga titled Übel Blatt II: Knights of the Fallen King began serialization in Monthly Big Gangan in February 2024.

An anime television series adaptation produced by Satelight and Staple Entertainment aired from January to March 2025.

== Plot ==
Twenty years ago, a young swordsman named Ascheriit earned the fabled title of Blatt Meister, or "Blade Master," for his exceptional skill with a sword. He was chosen by the Emperor of Szaalenden to be one of fourteen elite warriors on a perilous quest to defeat the evil nation of Wischtech. Wischtech was a formidable foe, possessing powerful weapons and dark magic. Equipped with lances blessed by the Emperor himself, the fourteen warriors traveled into enemy territory, losing three of their ranks to the dangers of the land. Seven of the remaining eleven abandoned the quest, fearful of the risks involved. Nevertheless, Ascheriit and three others proceeded to successfully complete the quest. It was then that the seven who abandoned the mission ambushed their comrades. Upon returning home, they told the Emperor that they completed the quest themselves after they were forced to kill the four who betrayed them. As a result, they were hailed as heroes and dubbed the Seven Heroes, while the four who were killed became symbols of treachery and received the moniker of Lances of Betrayal.

Thus, the story tells of the voyage of Ascheriit, now known as Köinzell, who indeed survived the slaughter and vowed to take the heads of his traitorous companions, who have over the years become powerful nobles and warlords hailed as saviors by the people.

== Characters ==
=== Main characters ===
Köinzell (ケインツェル, Keintseru)
Voiced by: Yūya Hirose (Japanese); Kyle McCarley (English)
Köinzell is a new name taken by one of the falsely labeled Lances of Betrayal, Ascheriit (アシェリート, Asherīto). Back in his childhood, he was an orphan who was found as baby by a swordsmith who adopted him. In his later youth, Köinzell learned the art of swordsmanship under the tutelage of Ms. Gleaa, a renowned swordsmaster. He is empowered by the twin moons of the world, and if too fatigued he shrinks into an emaciated child fairy until recovered.
Aht (アト, Ato)
Voiced by: Yui Kanari (Japanese); Kaitlyn Robrock (English)
The third princess of the Kusharundo clan, she is a young human girl who dressed as a man so as to fight on the frontline with her brother Klato, whom she looked up to. After the latter's death at the hands of Köinzell, Aht vowed vengeance. In time, she accepts that what Köinzell did was an act of mercy, and comes to respect him greatly, striving to get his acceptance and approval. Later on, she gains a similar form as Köinzell after he shares some of his blood to save her life.
Peepi (ピーピ, Pīpi)
Voiced by: Hina Tachibana (Japanese); Jeannie Tirado (English)
A young elven girl who is the only survivor of the village Miruel-Mirael. She tries in vain to pass the frontiers that divides the Empire from the bordering countries by smuggling herself, but is captured and almost put to death until Köinzell shows up and, to save her without bloodshed, addresses her as Peepi and claims to be her brother.
Geranpen (ゲランペン)
Voiced by: Kenichirou Matsuda (Japanese); Jamieson Price (English)
A giant man with a menacing look who is actually a kind person. He was a captain in Schtemwölech's White Wing Army whose leader is a young man named Pago, who Gerapen calls "brother". He unknowingly helps Pago gather young women refugees who are used in Schtemwölech experiments under the belief he is helping relocate them to a new village.

=== The Fourteen Lances ===
==== The Three Who Were Slain ====
The Three Lances who died on the journey to defeat Wischtech. So far, only one of them has been named.

Elgunaha (エルグナッハ, Erugunahha)
Elgunaha was a close friend of Köinzell, having met him while trying to convince the previous blade master to join the war effort. He was the first of the fourteen Lances to be sacrificed. He cast a spell that created a gigantic wall separating part of the world from the other, but the spell had an unintentional effect of turning the caster into stone.

==== The Seven Heroes ====
The Seven Heroes who supposedly defeated Wischtech during the war twenty years ago.

Schtemwölech (シュテムヴェレヒ, Shutemuverehi)
Voiced by: Taiten Kusunoki
One of the Fourteen Lances that massacred Ascheriit and his three companions and returned as heroes, thus becoming one of the fabled Seven Heroes. A mere stonemason turned thief before being chosen as one of the Fourteen Lances, he was good friends with Ascheriit. However, after becoming a lord, he became obsessed with all the power and rewards he received as a "hero" and desired to have them forever. He desires to live forever by use of Wischtech sorcery and medical experiments.
Barestar (バレスター, Baresutā)
Voiced by: Naoya Uchida (Japanese); Grant George (English)
A member of Fourteen Lances who betrayed Ascheriit. Before he was sent to the Emperor as one of the Lances, he was the son of a powerful merchant, the youngest of three brothers. Insecure and inept in dealing with business, he was instead chosen as an envoy to the Emperor due to his considerable physical prowess. He was a friend of Ascheriit, and one of the few members of the Seven Heroes to understand what the brutality of their acts would bring upon them all. After becoming a hero, he appears to have been corrupted, possibly by his guilt, and he started living lavishly, consumed by anger and envy against Glenn for not being granted constructions of war airships, and secretly turned his fortress into a flying castle armed with Wischtech engines of destruction.
Glenn (グレン, Guren)
Voiced by: Kazuhiko Inoue (Japanese); Kellen Goff (English)
One of the most prominent of the Seven Heroes, the mastermind of the betrayal of the Four Lances, and the primary antagonist of the series. Glenn is the son of the Emperor. He was nominated as envoy of the Emperor himself to deal with the increasingly threatening acts of Köinzell. In the days of the Fourteen Lances they were good friends, yet Glenn secretly despised and envied Ascheriit greatly due to his superior swordsmanship and his calm behavior.
Lebelont (レベロント, Reberonto)
An ambitious and powerful "hero" of the empire. During the time of the 14 Holy Lances, Lebelont was the most fearful of the Forest of Death. He could not keep calm at the night of their stay in the Forest of Death, claiming that there was nothing that 11 of the remaining Holy Lances could do, and that they should just give up. He inspired fear in the other Seven Heroes, prompting Glenn to abandon their quest.
Ischüdien (イシューディーン, Ishūdīn)
The Dragon Chief of the empire. His ideas agree with Glenn's, and he tries to use his power as a hero to make the empire a better place. Due to Lebelont recent actions, including the massacre of Jebr and reigniting the war with the Wischtech, Ischüdien forms an alliance with Order of the Seven Lances, as he sees Lebelont's acts as having gone too far, and may destroy the empire.
Güllengurv (ギュレングルフ, Gyurengurufu)
Almost nothing is known about Güllengurv currently, except that he is in charge of the castle which the priestess who reads the moons and stars resides. He is the fattest of the Seven Heroes. He and Nirgenfeled are almost always seen together. He has his throat slashed by Köinzell while he and Nirgenfeled hid in the armory of Lebelont's castle.
Nirgenfeled (ニルゲンフェレト, Nirugenfereto)
Little is known about Nirgenfeled, but in all of his appearances as an old man he has held a look of worry on his face.

==== The Traitorous Lances ====
The Four Lances who apparently betrayed the Empire to Wisstech. The truth was that they were the ones who actually completed the quest while the Seven Heroes ambushed and murdered them, and afterwards stole credit for their accomplishments.

Kfer (クファー, Kufā)
Kfer was a man with great pride and honor. He maintained a calm manner and puts his duty before anything else. He was the heir of the Jebnaress clan, the ruling clan of Jebr.
Güsstav (ギュスタフ, Gyusutafu)
Little is known about Güsstav, but according to Kfer, she had "more experience in war than anyone". Lebelont said that Güsstav was born in a stranded area, and was not a noble.
Krentel (クレンテル, Kurenteru)
Little is known about Krentel, but according to Kfer, he had "supreme knowledge of magic". Lebelont said that Krentel was born in a stranded area, and was not a noble.

=== Szaalenden Empire ===
Emperor Largor the Third (ラルゴールIII世, Rarugōru Sansē)
The current reigning Emperor. Largor was a strong leader who has made the Szaalenden empire prosper since the Wischtech War. After the death of his son, Glenn, he lost all interest in governing the empire. As a result, Lebelont used this to his advantage, becoming the de facto ruler of the empire.
Ikfes (イクフェス, Ikufesu)
Voiced by: Tomohiro Ōno (Japanese); Zach Aguilar (English)
Son of Kfer and slave knight serving under Glenn, his swordsmanship is almost on the same level as Koinzell, thought Ms. Gleaa stated that he is more skilled than Ascheriit who is in fact Köinzell. He has been studying under Ms. Gleaa for five years and was told if he killed the Hero Slayer, he would regain his title as Imperial Royalty. He has a little brother.
Ms. Gleaa (グーリェ, Gūrye)
Voiced by: Mie Sonozaki^{Ep. 9 credits} (Japanese); Jessica George (English)
A swordsmanship teacher at the Mansion of Swords, she has spent twenty years rebuilding the reputation of the school after Ascheriit was labeled a traitor. She taught Ascheriit and hates Glenn for killing him.

==== Order of the Seven Lances ====
Rozen (ロズン, Rozun)
Voiced by: Kenji Hamada (Japanese); Sean Chiplock (English)
Rozen is an officer of the Order of the Seven Lances, the personal unit of Glenn. He and his retinues help Köinzell, until learning of his true nature.
Schemle (シェムリェ, Shemurye)
Voiced by: Shiori Sugiura (Japanese); Kaitlyn Robrock (English)
Rozen's attendant. A young woman with glasses, she is extremely skilled with the crossbow and specializes in delivering bolts with explosive arrowheads.
Elseria Rahnclave (エルサリア・ラハンクレーブ, Erusaria Rahankurēbu)
Voiced by: Kaori Maeda (Japanese); Ryan Bartley (English)
The daughter of the imperial elector Aleczalt Rahnclave and a knight of the Seven Lances. She first meets Köinzell at the town of Jullas Abllas. It is also there that her view of the once traitor and enemy to the empire changes into something more.
Daliste (ダリステ, Darisute)
Voiced by: Kenji Nomura (Japanese); Jason Griffith (English)
A knight of the Seven Lances who follows Elseria. This knight specializes in the use of chains or ropes to inflict damage or capture his enemies.

=== Others ===
==== The Besiegers ====
A group led by a former admirers of the "Hero Killer".

Wied (ヴィド, Vido)
Voiced by: Toshiki Masuda (Japanese); Ryan Colt Levy (English)
A smuggler and acquaintance of Altea, he initially shows up to help Peepi and Köinzell as they are questioned, and escapes with them to the Empire after the destruction of the border fortress Heaven's Lance.
Altea (アルテア, Arutea)
Voiced by: Hitomi Ueda (Japanese); Abby Trott (English)
A smuggler of Heaven's Lance and owner of an underground tavern, she takes an instant liking to Köinzell after he is introduced to her.

==== The Black Wing Army ====
A rebel army in the frontier borderlands near Wischtech, the army is led by four former landlords who were veterans of the Wischtech war who lost their lands after defending it from rival warlords but were accused of the starting the border disputes.

Fake Kfer (偽クファー, Nise Kufā)
Fake Kfer is a massive brute who merely loves killing and raping women without any feeling for others. He attacks without concern even with his own troops. He wields a massive mace and rides an equally large horse whom he loves more than anything else.
Fake Güsstav (偽ギュスタフ, Nise Gyusutafu)
A large woman and cruel magic user who likes to see men running in fear and dying horribly. A narcissist, she likes young, beautiful boys and brainwashes them and performs cruel and morbid surgeries by adding animals parts on them, with one of the victims being Ato's brother Klato.
Fake Krentel (偽クレンテル, Nise Kurenteru)
A conniving short man, he used Wischtech magic to turn the frontier Count of the borderlands into a monster to attack Köinzell and the Order of the Seven Lances.
Fake Ascheriit (偽アシェリート, Nise Asherīto)
A tall man with long hair, he uses twin blades and two obsidian swords implanted within his back, which he claims is the Black Wing.

== Media ==
=== Manga ===
Written and illustrated by Etorouji Shiono, Übel Blatt began serialization in the semi-monthly Young Gangan in December 2004. It returned from a two-year hiatus in Monthly Big Gangan on December 24, 2011. The manga finished on March 25, 2019. Publisher Square Enix collected the chapters in 24 tankōbon volumes, beginning with volume 0 on July 25, 2005, and ending with volume 23 on June 25, 2019.

A side-story titled Übel Blatt Gaiden was published in Young Gangan Big on August 25, 2011. In February 2014, Yen Press announced they had licensed Übel Blatt for English release in North America. They published the series in omnibus format of two volumes in one, with volume 0 (Japanese volumes 0 and 1) released in October 2014, and the last (Japanese volumes 22 and 23) on December 17, 2019. The manga was published in France by Ki-oon, who released the first volume on May 24, 2007, and the last one on October 3, 2019.

A sequel, titled Übel Blatt II: Knights of the Fallen King (ユーベルブラットII 死せる王の騎士団, Yūberu Buratto II: Shiseru Ō no Kishidan), began serialization in Monthly Big Gangan on February 24, 2024. The sequel is set to end on October 23, 2026. Its chapters have been collected in four tankōbon volumes as of April 24, 2026. The sequel is published digitally in North America by Square Enix via their Manga Up! Global app. During their panel at Anime NYC 2026, Yen Press announced that they had also licensed the sequel for English publication.

=== Anime ===
An anime television series adaptation was announced in Monthly Big Gangan on February 24, 2024. It was produced by Satelight and Staple Entertainment, and directed by Takashi Naoya, with Tatsuya Takahashi overseeing series scripts, Matsuo Asami serving as assistant director, Kiyoshi Tateishi designing the characters, and Shun Narita composing the music. The series aired from January 11 to March 29, 2025, on Tokyo MX and other networks. (Note: Tokyo MX listed the series premiere on January 10, 2025, at 24:30, which is effectively January 11 at 12:30 a.m. JST.) The opening theme song is "Zainin" (罪人; "Sinner"), performed by Garnidelia, while the ending theme song is "Stella", performed by Hina Tachibana. Amazon Prime Video streams the series worldwide.

==== Episodes ====
No.	Title (Note: The Japanese titles contain the same German-language pretitles as in English.)	Directed by (Note: Production staff information is taken from the ending credits of each episode.)	Written by	Storyboarded by	Original release date
1	"Durch bruch (Break Through)"; Transliteration: "Toppa" (Japanese: 《突破》)	Matsuo Asami	Tatsuya Takahashi	Takashi Naoya	January 11, 2025
2	"Unter Morgen Monde (Under the Morning Moons)"; Transliteration: "Zangetsu no Shita de" (Japanese: 《残月の下で》)	Matsuo Asami	Tatsuya Takahashi	Takashi Naoya	January 18, 2025
3	"Langer Regen (The Long Rain)"; Transliteration: "Nagai Ame" (Japanese: 《長い雨》)	Matsuo Asami	Tetsuya Yamada	Kōji Iwai	January 25, 2025
4	"Köinzell"; Transliteration: "Keintseru" (Japanese: 《ケインツェル》)	Matsuo Asami	Tetsuya Yamada	Kōji Iwai	February 1, 2025
5	"Die Burg vom Helden (The Castle of the Hero)"; Transliteration: "Eiyū no Shiro" (Japanese: 《英雄の城》)	Ryo Nakamura	Tatsuya Takahashi	Masayoshi Nishida	February 8, 2025
6	"Schtemwölech"; Transliteration: "Shutemuverehi" (Japanese: 《シュテムヴェレヒ》)	Ryo Nakamura	Tatsuya Takahashi	Masayoshi Nishida	February 15, 2025
7	"Der leere Sarg (The Empty Coffin)"; Transliteration: "Kara no Kan" (Japanese: 《空の棺》)	Takuya Sawada	Tatsuya Takahashi	Takashi Naoya	February 22, 2025
8	"Der Heldmörder (The Hero-Killer)"; Transliteration: "Eiyūgoroshi" (Japanese: 《英雄殺し》)	Matsuo Asami	Tetsuya Yamada	Masayoshi Nishida	March 1, 2025
9	"Junge Blätter (Young Leaf)"; Transliteration: "Wakaba" (Japanese: 《若葉》)	Matsuo Asami	Tetsuya Yamada	Masayoshi Nishida	March 8, 2025
10	"Gegenangriff (Counterattack)"; Transliteration: "Hangeki" (Japanese: 《反擊》)	Ryo Nakamura	Tatsuya Takahashi	Kōji Iwai	March 15, 2025
11	"Gefühl zu... (With Feeling)"; Transliteration: "Omoi no Saki ni" (Japanese: 《想いの先に》)	Ryo Nakamura	Tetsuya Yamada	Kōji Iwai	March 22, 2025
12	"Neues Schwert (New Sword)"; Transliteration: "Aratanaru Ken" (Japanese: 《新たなる剣》)	Takuya Sawada	Tatsuya Takahashi	Takashi Naoya	March 29, 2025

== Reception ==
The series' twelfth collected volume sold 29,167 copies in its debut week, the thirteenth sold 28,574, and the seventeenth 22,358 copies.

Rebecca Silverman of Anime News Network gave the first English omnibus a B rating, praising its revenge story. She saw similarities between Köinzell's past and The Count of Monte Cristo and stated that its supporting cast brings themes of racial inequality and political corruption. However, Silverman noted several "uncomfortable sexual moments", including rape, and called the backgrounds generic.
