= Umamusume: Pretty Derby =

Japanese media franchise

- Key visual of the series (global version)

ウマ娘 プリティーダービー (Umamusume Puritī Dābī)
- Genre: Sports (horse racing, athletics)
- Created by: Cygames
- Video game
- Developer: Cygames
- Publisher: JP/WW: Cygames; KR: Kakao Games; TW/HK/MO: Komoe Game; CN: Bilibili
- Genre: Social network game, Sports, Raising sim
- Engine: Unity
- Platform: iOS, Android, Windows
- Released: iOS, Android: JP: February 24, 2021; KR: June 20, 2022; TW/HK/MO: June 27, 2022; CN: August 30, 2023; WW: June 26, 2025; Windows: JP: March 10, 2021; KR: June 15, 2023; WW: June 26, 2025
Further information
Manga
Umamusume: Pretty Derby – Haru Urara Ganbaru!
Written by	Katsumi Nakayama
Illustrated by	Huan Yu (ZECO)
Published by	Cygames
Magazine	Cycomi
Original run	May 8, 2016 – September 11, 2016
Manga
Starting Gate! Umamusume: Pretty Derby
Written by	S. Kosugi
Published by	Cygames (web); Kodansha (print, original); Shogakukan (print, re-release)
Magazine	Cycomi
Original run	March 25, 2017 – November 23, 2019
Volumes	4 (original); 6 (re-release)
Manga
Umayon
Written by	Jet Kuma
Published by	Cygames
Magazine	Cycomi
Original run	March 30, 2018 – January 14, 2021
Volumes	1
Manga
Umamusume: Pretty Derby – Uma Musumeshi
Written by	Tsukumo Asakusa
Published by	Cygames (web); Shogakukan (print)
Magazine	Cycomi
Original run	March 1, 2023 – present
Volumes	8
Manga
Umamusume: Pretty Derby – Star Blossom
Written by	Monjūsaki
Illustrated by	Shin Hotani
Published by	Shueisha
Magazine	Shōnen Jump+; Young Jump!; Tonari no Young Jump
Original run	April 10, 2023 – present
Volumes	7
Manga
Umamusume: PisuPisu☆SupiSupi Golshi-chan
Written by	Naoki Shibata
Published by	Shogakukan
Magazine	Weekly CoroCoro Comic
Original run	November 29, 2023 – present
Volumes	8
Video game
Umamusume: Pretty Derby – Party Dash
Developer	Cygames, Arc System Works
Publisher	Cygames
Genre	Action, Party
Platform	Nintendo Switch, PlayStation 4, Windows
Released	August 30, 2024
Related
Umamusume: Pretty Derby (Anime TV series); Umamusume: Cinderella Gray (Spin-off franchise); Umamusume: Pretty Derby – Beginning of a New Era (Anime film)
icon

Umamusume: Pretty Derby (Note: Japanese: ウマ娘プリティーダービー, Hepburn: Umamusume Puritī Dābī; lit. "Horse Girl Pretty Derby") is a Japanese multimedia franchise created by Cygames. The franchise centers on anthropomorphized racehorses known as Umamusume (ウマ娘; lit. 'horse girls'), who compete in races inspired by real-life race tracks managed by the Japan Racing Association. Most of the characters are named and themed after actual racehorses, reflecting their namesakes' personalities, racing records, and relationships with other racehorses. (Note: For example, the character Gold Ship is named after and based on the real-life Thoroughbred racehorse Gold Ship.) Initially announced in 2016 as a mobile game, the franchise soon expanded to include multiple anime series, manga, and live concerts.

The game was scheduled to debut in late 2018 for iOS and Android devices, but it was delayed to a February 2021 release, with a Windows client releasing a month later on DMM Games. The game was later released on Google Play Games in April 2023. The game was released in Korean by Kakao Games and Traditional Chinese by Komoe Game in June 2022, with the former language getting a PC version in a stand-alone client a year later, then later in Simplified Chinese by Bilibili in August 2024. An English-language edition was released worldwide in June 2025 for the aforementioned platforms, alongside a Steam release for both the bilingual (Japanese and English) versions.

The franchise has received generally positive reviews, both domestically in Japan and worldwide following the game's global release in 2025. The franchise has also had a significant cultural impact, with observers remarking on its positive impact on the sport of horse racing and bringing awareness to the stories of racehorses.

== Premise ==
Umamusume: Pretty Derby is set in a fictional universe similar to the real modern world but featuring the titular Umamusume, female kemonomimi with the ears, tails, and capabilities of horses who live alongside humans and replace actual horses in the franchise's setting. Many Umamusume are based on and modeled after real-life Thoroughbred racehorses of the past and present. Umamusume seek fame and fortune as both racers and idols by competing in organized races akin to middle-distance and long-distance track events. The series centers on Umamusume who attend the elite Tracen Academy in Tokyo and train to compete in the Twinkle Series of professional races organized by the Umamusume Racing Association (URA). The main stories across the series are focused on specific Umamusume and loosely based on the racing careers of the racehorses they are based on.

=== Anime ===
The main anime series depicts the journeys of various Umamusume who are affiliated with Team Spica, a racing team at Tracen Academy. Each season is a direct follow-up to the previous one, though the historical content greatly varies based on the real-life racing careers of the focused character.

- The first season features Special Week, who aspires to become the best Umamusume in Japan, all while idolizing Silence Suzuka's style and wanting to reach the same heights as her and their friends with King Halo, El Condor Pasa, Seiun Sky, and Grass Wonder. The story is based on Special Week's races from 1997 to 1999.
- The second season features Tokai Teio, who continues to persevere despite suffering multiple injuries that endanger her career and struggling to remain one of the best racers of her generation that includes Mejiro McQueen, Rice Shower, and Mihono Bourbon. The story is based on Tokai Teio's races from 1991 to 1993.
- The third season features Kitasan Black, who aims to win on her own merits through her camaraderie and friendly rivalry with Satono Diamond, while also facing a new generation of Umamusume such as Duramente, Satono Crown, and Cheval Grand. The story is based on Kitasan Black's races from 2015 to 2017.

Road to the Top and Beginning of a New Era respectively feature Narita Top Road and Jungle Pocket in the rivalries that defined their generation of Umamusume, with Narita Top Road facing off against T. M. Opera O and Admire Vega, and Jungle Pocket against Agnes Tachyon, Manhattan Cafe, and Dantsu Flame. They are based on events surrounding the Classic races of 1999 and 2001.

=== Manga ===
Cinderella Gray and its anime adaptation depict the races between Oguri Cap, who transfers from the regional racing scene to the Twinkle Series, and rivals of the previous and next generations that include Tamamo Cross, Inari One, and Super Creek. The story is based on Oguri Cap's races from 1987 to 1990.

Star Blossom depicts the races of Sakura Laurel and her peers such as Sakura Bakushin O, Mayano Top Gun, Marvelous Sunday, and Narita Brian, as she aspires to achieve acclaim through defeating Narita Brian and racing at the Prix de l'Arc de Triomphe in spite of her fragile body. The story is based on Sakura Laurel's races from 1994 to 1997.

=== Video game ===
Act 1 of the main story focuses on the efforts of Team Sirius as it flourishes following the retirement of the team's star racer Oguri Cap and previous trainer. The story is based on the races run by Mejiro McQueen, Rice Shower, Winning Ticket, Narita Brian, Silence Suzuka, and Special Week in the 1990s. A number of supporting characters appear throughout the story including Gold Ship, Biwa Hayahide, and Narita Taishin.

Act 2 of the main story focuses on the efforts of Team Ascella and the journeys of Tiara Umamusume, who are characters based on racemares. The story is based on the races run by racemares Rhein Kraft, Cesario, and Fusaichi Pandora in the mid-2000s, and features a supporting cast such as King Halo, Air Messiah, and Daring Heart.

== Gameplay ==
Career gameplay interface, featuring the trainee Daiwa Scarlet

Umamusume: Pretty Derby is a sports simulation game that allows players, who are referred to in-game as "trainers", to raise and train Umamusume to compete in races whilst achieving the Umamusume's individual goals. Players collect two types of units through the game's gacha system: playable Umamusume or "trainees", and support cards that provide skills and bonuses.

The main gameplay mode, "Career", lets players choose a scenario, trainee, and support cards, then work to achieve specific goals. Players must also factor in the trainee's preferred terrain type, track distance, and running style in order to perform well. The game operates on a calendar system, with each action or turn taking up half a month, requiring strategic planning and balancing of the actions to be taken.

The calendar used is based on the real-life JRA's race schedule, with the races that players can enter being based on their real-life equivalents, such as the Japan Cup or the Arima Kinen. Succeeding scenarios would also allow players to enter G1 international races, notably the French Prix de l'Arc de Triomphe and the American Breeders' Cup.

Players use turns to raise their trainee's five attributes (speed, stamina, power, guts, and wit), rest to restore energy, enter races to earn skill points and fans, infirmary to cure a negative condition, and recreation to raise the trainee's mood, which affects training effectiveness and race performance. Additionally, random events can occur during a Career attempt that may grant additional stats, skills, and buffs or debuffs, as well as positively or negatively impact the mood.

Winning G1 races, as well as reaching certain stat totals and acquiring skills, grants stats and potential skills known as "sparks". These can be passed down to trainees as "legacies", allowing them to inherit these and be strengthened in future Career attempts.

Alongside the Career, players can also partake in other game modes, including the PvP "Team Trials" and "Champions Meeting" races, where players use their best trainees to compete against each other in a set of races for various rewards, and "Legend Races", where players race against notable Umamusume to gain rewards and upgrade their trainees.

== Development and release ==
The game was announced on March 26, 2016, during Cygames' panel at that year's AnimeJapan event. Concept art for the project's various characters and an animated trailer by P.A. Works were revealed during the event, alongside the project's brief. The game was set to be released in late 2018; however, it was delayed by Cygames in order to further polish the game's quality, with its new release date pushed back to February 24, 2021. The PC version was released on March 10, 2021, on DMM Games, then later on April 19, 2023, on Google Play Games. A YouTube channel titled Pakatube! (ぱかチューブっ!, Pakachūbu!) was launched on March 25, 2018, to promote the game, prominently featuring Gold Ship. As of October 2026, there are 136 playable horse girls in the game. Part 2 of the main story was released in March 2024.

On February 15, 2022, Komoe Game announced the release of a traditional Chinese version of the game app for Taiwan, Hong Kong, and Macau, and pre-registration began on April 27. The traditional Chinese version was officially released on June 27, 2022. In South Korea, Kakao Games released on June 20, 2022, and pre-registrations, which began on April 28, 2022, exceeded 1 million in 10 days. A PC version for the Korean version was released on June 15, 2024. In China, Bilibili released a simplified Chinese version on August 30, 2023, and pre-registrations, which began on August 4, 2023, exceeded 1 million in 10 days. However, due to censorship the simplified Chinese version has modified all names and texts related to gambling, Japanese nationalist and militarist-related comments. The Tennō Shō, the Takamatsunomiya Kinen, the Arima Kinen, the Yasuda Kinen, and names related to Fukushima have been changed in game.

On June 24, 2024, a Paka Live TV livestream on Pakatube! announced the release of an English version of the game. As part of promotions for the English version launch, Cygames entered into sponsorship deals with several prominent U.S. horse racing events, and a booth was operated at Churchill Downs where attendees are able to play a demo of Umamusume: Pretty Derby. On April 27, 2025, a Paka Live TV livestream announced its release date, along with a PC version on Steam for both the Japanese and English versions. Pre-registration started on April 28, 2025, and the game was released on June 26, 2025.

== Other media ==
=== Umamusume: Pretty Derby – Party Dash ===
Umamusume: Pretty Derby – Party Dash (ウマ娘 プリティーダービー 熱血ハチャメチャ大感謝祭, Umamusume Puritī Dābī Nekketsu Hachamecha Daikanshasai), a party video game developed by Cygames and Arc System Works, was announced during the Nintendo Direct live stream on June 21, 2023. The game was released on Nintendo Switch, PlayStation 4, and Steam on August 30, 2024.

=== Live events ===
No.	Title	Dates	City/Country	Venue	Ref.
1	Umamusume 1st Event "Special Weekend!"	July 1, 2017	Urayasu, Japan	Maihama Amphitheater	
2	Umamusume 2nd Event "Sound Fanfare!"	October 14, 2018	Chiba, Japan	Makuhari Messe	
3	Umamusume 3rd Event "Winning Dream Stage"	August 28–29, 2021	Tokyo, Japan	Tokyo Garden Theater	
4	Umamusume 4th Event "Special Dreamers!!"				
4	Tokyo Stage	March 6–7, 2022	Tokyo, Japan	Musashino Forest Sport Plaza	
4	Yokohama Stage	May 4–5, 2022	Yokohama, Japan	Pia Arena MM	
4	Extra Stage	November 5–6, 2022	Tokorozawa, Japan	Belluna Dome	
5	Umamusume 5th Event Arena Tour "Go Beyond"				
5	-Wish-	July 15–16, 2023	Yokohama, Japan	Pia Arena MM	
5	-Gaze-	September 16–17, 2023	Nagoya, Japan	Portmesse Nagoya	
5	-Yell-	July 15–16, 2023	Tokyo, Japan	Ariake Arena	
5	-New Gate-	March 22–23, 2024	Osaka, Japan	Osaka-jō Hall	
6	Umamusume 6th Event "The New Frontier"				
6	Spring Performance	May 24–25, 2025	Saitama, Japan	Saitama Super Arena	
6	Autumn Performance	October 18–19, 2025	Saitama, Japan	Saitama Super Arena	
7	Umamusume 7th Event World Tour "The Stage"				
7	In Tokyo	June 20–21, 2026	Tokyo, Japan	Ariake Arena	
7	In Los Angeles	Cancelled	Los Angeles, United States	Peacock Theater	
7	In London	January 19–20, 2027	London, United Kingdom	Hammersmith Apollo	
7	In Seoul	TBA	Seoul, South Korea	TBA	
7	In Yokohama	TBA	Yokohama, Japan	TBA	

=== Manga series ===
==== Umamusume: Pretty Derby – Haru Urara Ganbaru! ====
A manga series titled Umamusume: Pretty Derby – Haru Urara Ganbaru! (ウマ娘 プリティーダービー ハルウララがんばる!; lit. 'Umamusume: Pretty Derby – Haru Urara, Do Your Best!'), written and drafted by Katsumi Nakayama and illustrated by Huan Yu (ZECO), began serialization on Cygames' Cycomi website on its launch day on May 8, 2016, and ended on September 11 with 10 chapters released. It is based on the real-life racehorse Haru Urara, with her anthropomorphized counterpart as the main character. It is no longer available for distribution and has not yet been published in tankōbon form.

==== Starting Gate! Umamusume: Pretty Derby ====
A manga series written and illustrated by S. Kosugi, titled Starting Gate! Umamusume: Pretty Derby (STARTING GATE! -ウマ娘 プリティーダービー-, Stātingu Geito! Uma Musume Puritī Dābī), was serialized on Cygames' Cycomi website from March 25, 2017, to November 23, 2019. Kodansha originally published the series in four tankōbon volumes, released from July 2017 to March 2019. A new edition by Shogakukan was released digitally starting in July 2020, with an additional fifth and sixth volume released in June and July 2021. The volumes were later published in print with new cover artworks from November 2021 to March 2022. Based on the setting of the CD drama Special Today! containing lore before the P.A. Works anime adaptation, the story focuses on the school life of the Umamusume before their debut as racers.

No.	Release date	ISBN
1	July 28, 2017 (Kodansha); November 18, 2021 (Shogakukan)	978-4-06-509201-9 (Kodansha); 978-4-09-850710-8 (Shogakukan)
2	January 28, 2018 (Kodansha); November 18, 2021 (Shogakukan)	978-4-06-509247-7 (Kodansha); 978-4-09-850711-5 (Shogakukan)
3	May 30, 2018 (Kodansha); January 19, 2022 (Shogakukan)	978-4-06-509267-5 (Kodansha); 978-4-09-850712-2 (Shogakukan)
4	March 29, 2019 (Kodansha); January 19, 2022 (Shogakukan)	978-4-06-515533-2 (Kodansha); 978-4-09-850713-9 (Shogakukan)
5	March 18, 2022 (Shogakukan)	978-4-09-850714-6 (Shogakukan)
6	March 18, 2022 (Shogakukan)	978-4-09-850715-3 (Shogakukan)

==== Umayon ====
A four-panel manga series titled Umayon (うまよん), written and illustrated by Jet Kuma with storyboards by Jin Itō, was serialized on Cygames' Cycomi website from March 30, 2018, to January 15, 2021. The chapters were compiled into a booklet included with the anime adaptation's Blu-ray release on December 8, 2021.

==== Umamusume: Cinderella Gray ====
Another manga series, titled Umamusume: Cinderella Gray (ウマ娘 シンデレラグレイ, Uma Musume Shinderera Gurei), produced by Junnosuke Itō, written by Masafumi Sugiura, and illustrated by Taiyō Kuzumi, was serialized in Shueisha's Weekly Young Jump from June 11, 2020, to December 25, 2025. The first collected tankōbon volume was released on January 19, 2021. As of March 2026, twenty-three volumes have been released.

==== Umamusume: Pretty Derby – Uma Musumeshi ====
Another manga series that focuses on the "food" of Umamusume, titled Umamusume: Pretty Derby – Uma Musumeshi (ウマ娘 プリティーダービー うまむすめし), written by Tsukumo Asakusa, began serialization on Cygames' Cycomi website on March 1, 2023. As of October 2026, eight volumes have been released by Shogakukan.

No.	Release date	ISBN
1	July 19, 2023	978-4-09-852338-2
2	October 19, 2023	978-4-09-852880-6
3	February 28, 2024	978-4-09-853103-5
4	June 19, 2024	978-4-09-853334-3
5	December 19, 2024	978-4-09-8536207
6	September 19, 2025	978-4-09-854228-4
7	March 18, 2026	978-4-09-854459-2
8	October 19, 2026	978-4-09-854773-9

==== Umamusume: Pretty Derby – Star Blossom ====
Another manga series, titled Umamusume: Pretty Derby – Star Blossom (ウマ娘 プリティーダービー スターブロッサム, Umamusume Pretty Derby: Sutā Burossamu), written by Monjūsaki and illustrated by Shin Hotani, began serialization in Shueisha's Shōnen Jump+, YanJan! app and Tonari no Young Jump website on April 10, 2023. As of October 2026, seven volumes have been released.

No.	Release date	ISBN
1	September 19, 2023	978-4-08-892828-9
2	March 18, 2024	978-4-08-893136-4
3	September 19, 2024	978-4-08-893368-9
4	March 18, 2025	978-4-08-893601-7
5	September 19, 2025	978-4-08-893818-9
6	April 17, 2026	978-4-08-894211-7
7	October 19, 2026	978-4-08-894377-0

==== Umamusume: PisuPisu☆SupiSupi Golshi-chan ====
A gag comedy manga series that follows the antics of Gold Ship as a kindergartener, titled Umamusume: PisuPisu☆SupiSupi Golshi-chan (ウマ娘 ピスピス☆スピスピ ゴルシちゃん), written and illustrated by Naoki Shibata, began serialization in Shogakukan's Weekly CoroCoro Comic manga website on November 29, 2023. As of June 2026, eight volumes have been released.

No.	Release date	ISBN
1	February 28, 2024	978-4-09-143703-7
2	June 27, 2024	978-4-09-149740-6
3	December 18, 2024	978-4-09-149839-7
4	March 28, 2025	978-4-09-154018-8
5	June 27, 2025	978-4-09-154040-9
6	October 28, 2025	978-4-09-154085-0
7	February 27, 2026	978-4-09-154136-9
8	June 26, 2026	978-4-09-154283-0

=== Anime adaptations ===
The franchise has also received an anime television series adaptation which ran from April 2018 to December 2023 in three seasons, produced by P.A. Works for the first season and assisting on production for the second season and Studio Kai for the second and third seasons, and streamed by Crunchyroll. Alongside the main anime, there are also four spin-off shorts series, one ONA, one film, and one spin-off anime series.

=== Stage play ===
Umamusume Pretty Derby: Sprinters' Story (舞台「ウマ娘 プリティーダービー」〜Sprinters' Story〜) was performed from January 15 to 29, 2023, in Stellar Ball, Shinagawa Prince Hotel, Tokyo. Performances from January 16 to 26 were canceled due to the COVID-19 pandemic, but resumed on January 27. The stage play features Daitaku Helios as the main character, with its story based on the events leading to the 1991 Sprinters Stakes.

== Reception and cultural impact ==
=== Video game ===
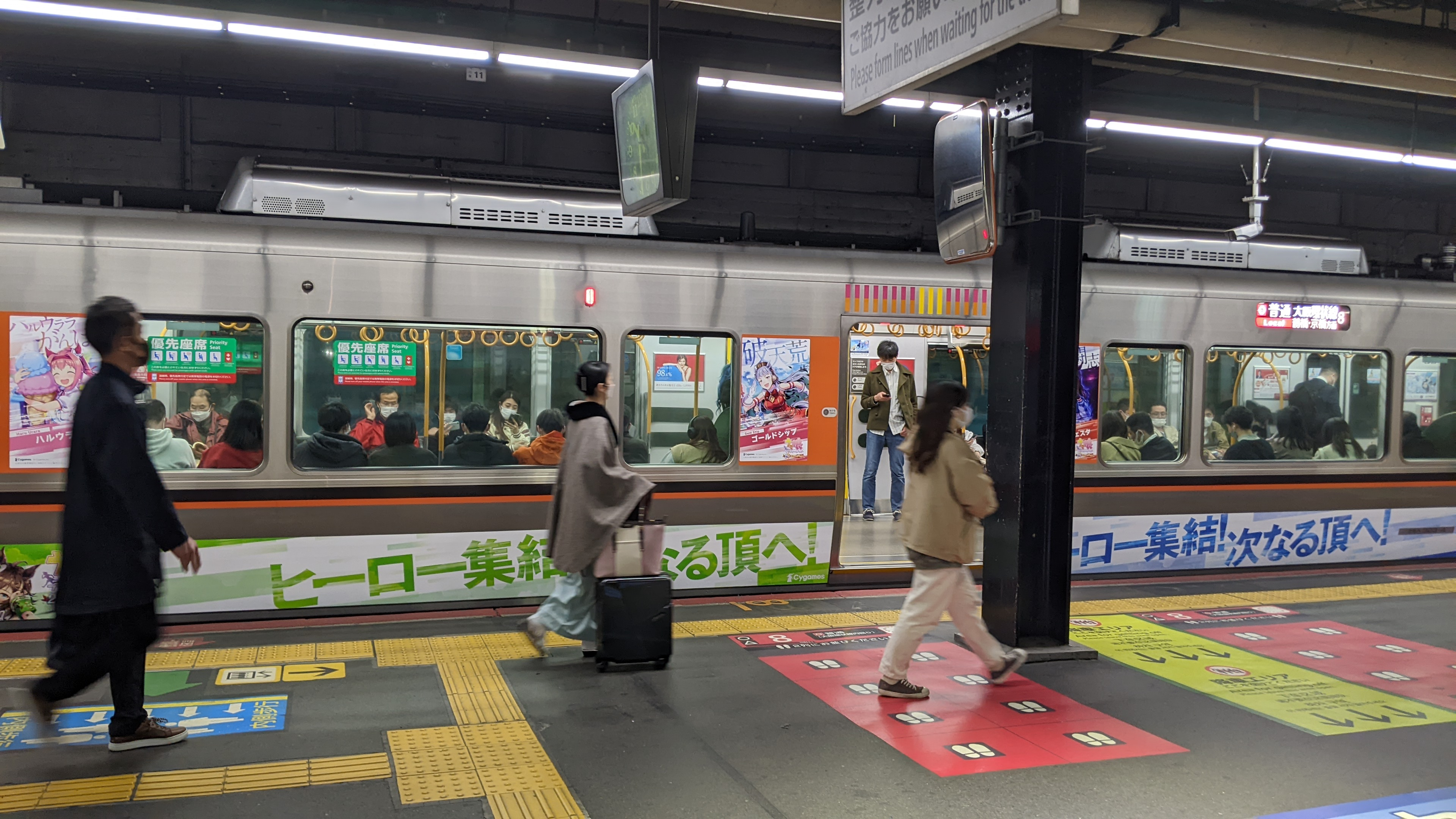
Wrap advertisement on JR West 323 series trains at the Osaka Loop Line in Tennōji Station, Osaka

The game received "generally favorable" reviews from critics, according to review aggregator website Metacritic. Critics praised the diversity of content offered, gameplay depth that encourages replay value, and character writing which respects their real-life inspirations. However, critics have also criticized the monetization through the gacha system as being predatory and the gameplay potentially being difficult for casual players.

==== Revenue ====
The mobile game, within ten months of release, grossed nearly US$965 million (¥142.7 billion) in Japan by December 2021, making it the ninth-highest-grossing mobile game in 2021. The game has since generated over $2.5 billion (¥375 billion) in revenue as of March 2025, making it one of the most profitable mobile games in Japan.

Following its global release in June 2025, the game generated $45.4 million worldwide for the first 30 days, of which 50.3% comprised sales outside Japan. Among international markets, the United States accounted for 68% of all overseas spending and 34% of total global revenue.

==== Accolades ====
Year	Award	Category	Result	Ref.
2021	Gadget News Buzzword Awards	Anime Buzzword Award	Runner-up	
2021	Gadget News Buzzword Awards	Internet Buzzword Award	Won	
2021	Google Play Japan Best of 2021	Best Mobile Game	Won	
2021	Japan Game Awards	Award for Excellence	Won	
2021	SNS Buzzword Awards	Most Popular Buzzword – Game Category	Won	
2021	Yahoo Japan Search Awards	Culture Category – Game Division	Won	
2022	AMD Awards	Excellence Award	Won	
2022	CEDEC Awards	Sound Division (Umamusume: Pretty Derby Sound Development Team)	Won	
2022	Famitsu Dengeki Game Awards	Music Division	Won	
2022	Famitsu Dengeki Game Awards	Voice Actor Division (Hitomi Ueda as Gold Ship)	Won	
2022	Famitsu Dengeki Game Awards	Character Division (Gold Ship)	Won	
2022	Famitsu Dengeki Game Awards	Rookie Division	Won	
2022	16th Seiyu Awards	Game Award	Won	
2025	The Game Awards 2025	Best Mobile Game	Won	
2026	15th New York Game Awards	A-Train Award for Best Mobile Game	Nominated	
2026	29th Annual D.I.C.E. Awards	Mobile Game of the Year	Nominated	

=== Cultural impact ===
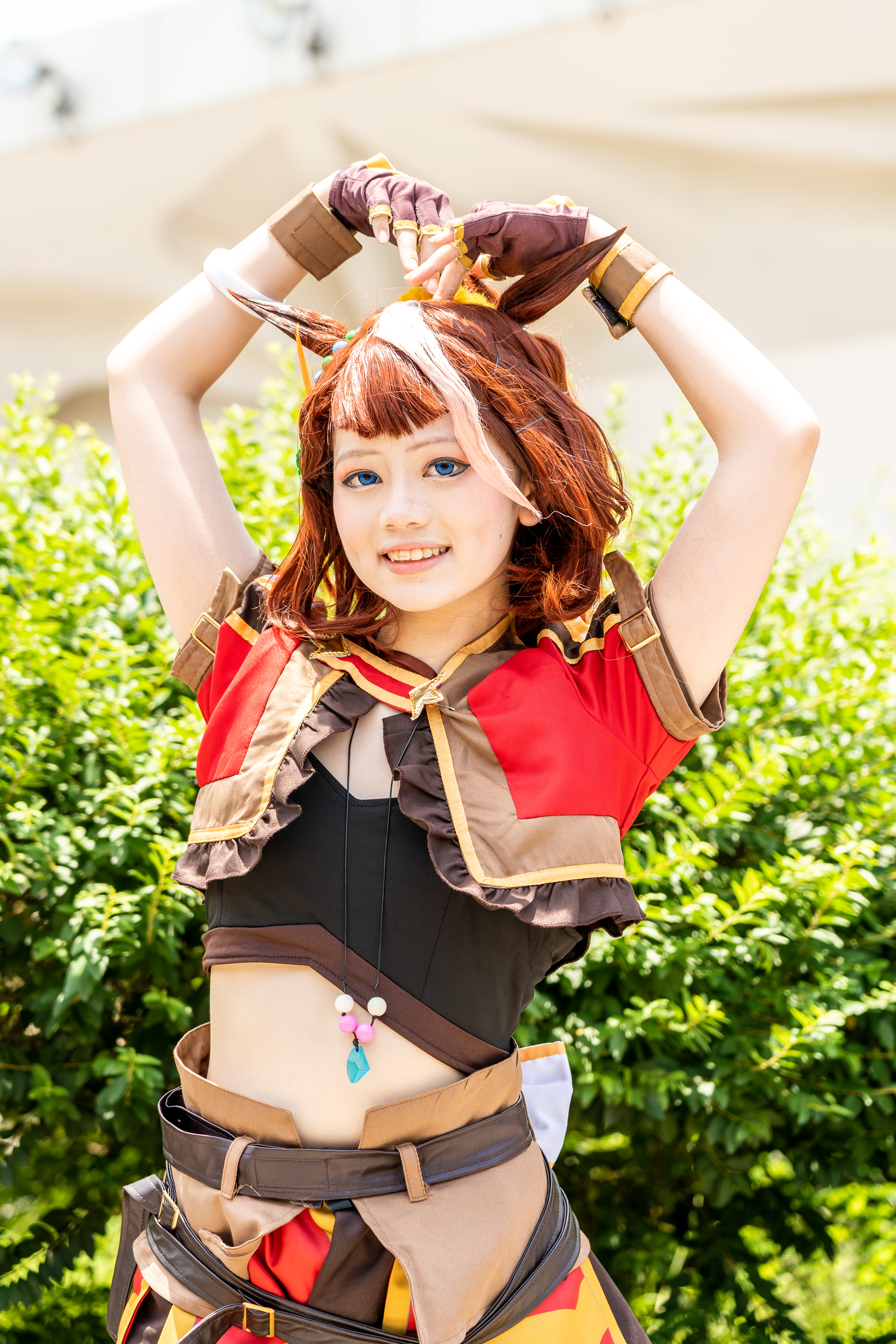
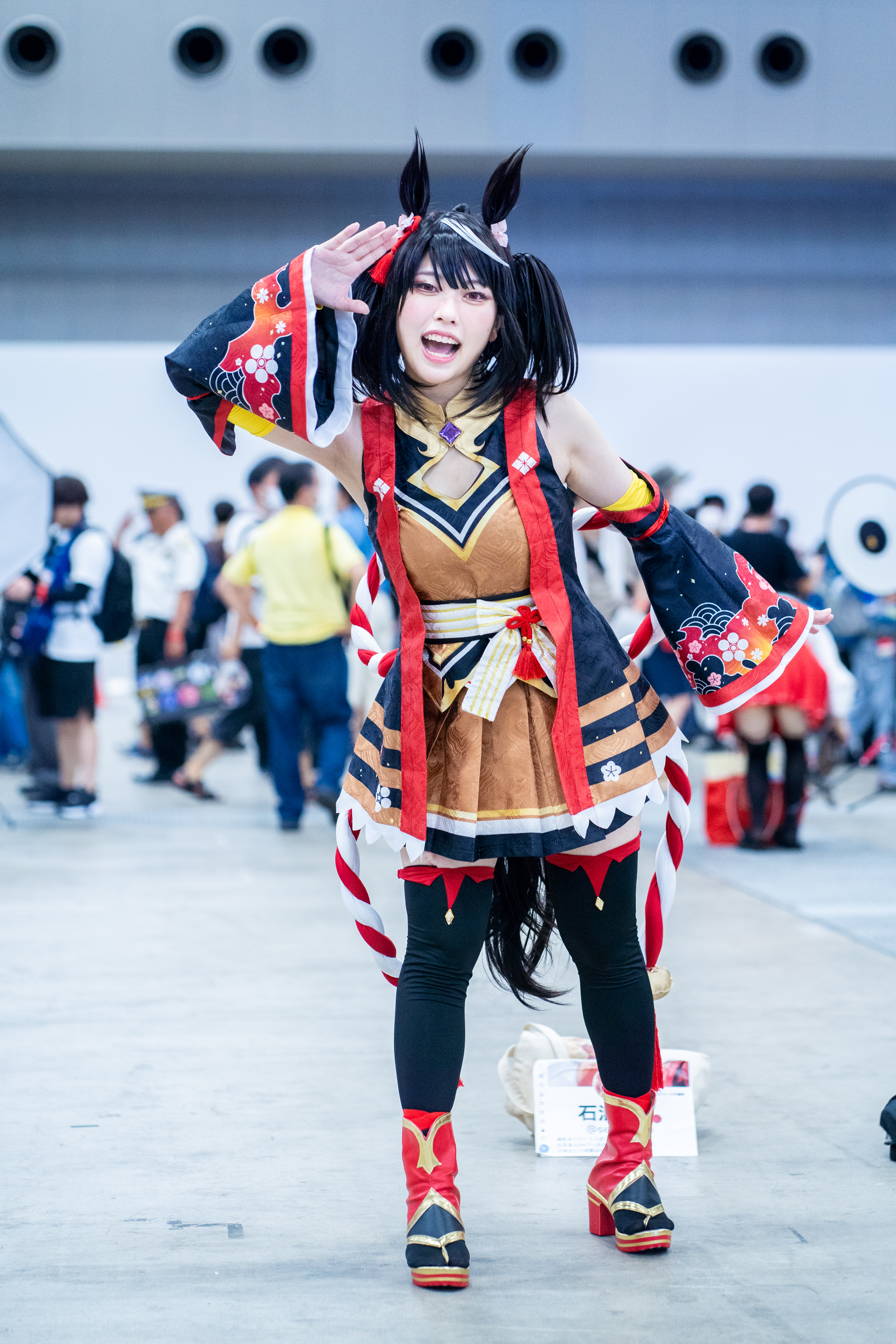
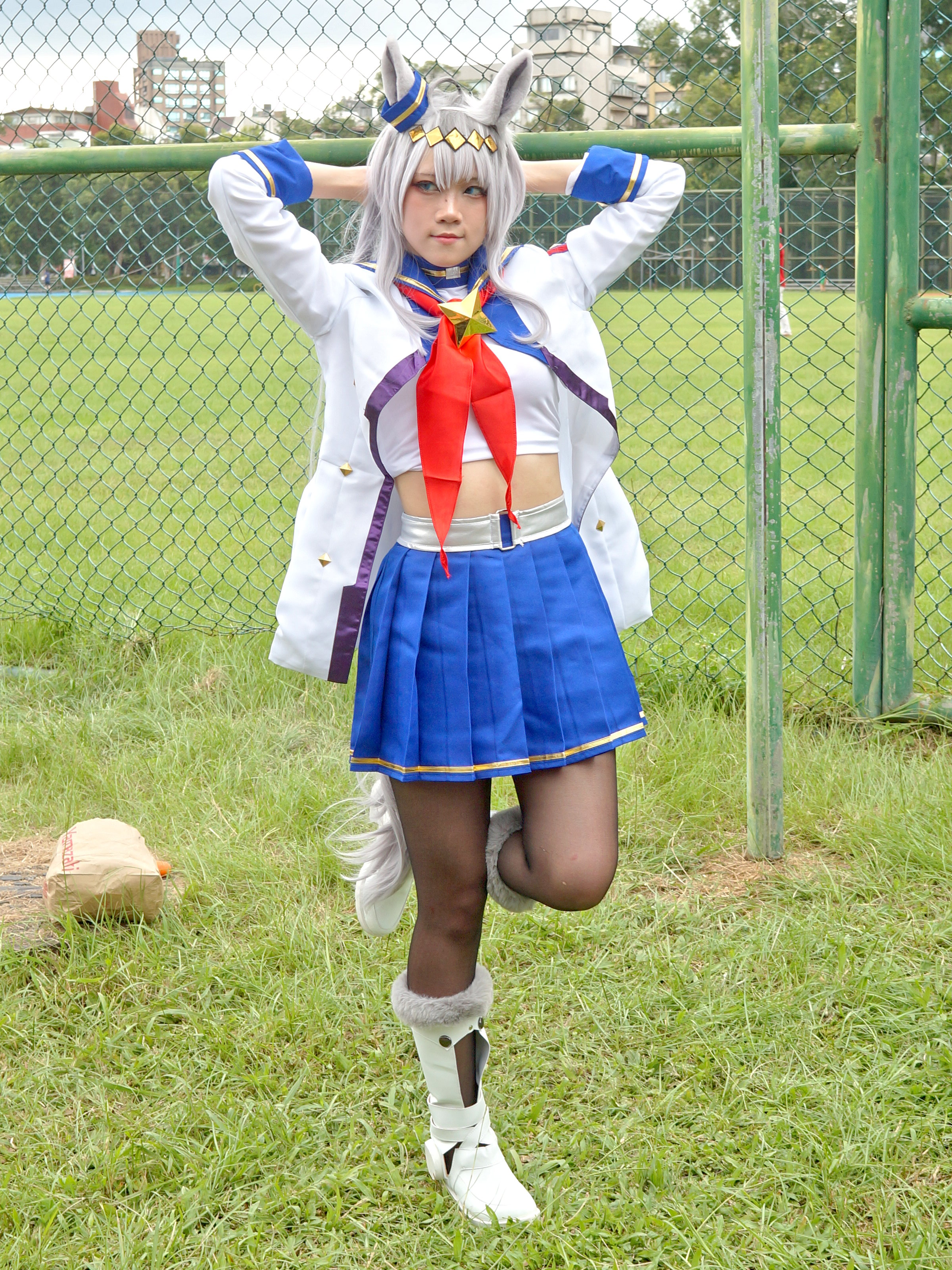
Cosplayers of the anthropomorphic representations of (from left to right) Tokai Teio, Kitasan Black, and Oguri Cap

The franchise has had a significant cultural impact, particularly in Japan, becoming a multi-billion dollar multimedia franchise. The franchise also consistently emphasizes universal themes like perseverance, teamwork, personal growth, and overcoming challenges, which resonate with a broad audience. While its primary market is Japan, the game has also been released in other Asia-Pacific territories, and an English version was eventually released, indicating its broader global impact.

==== Domestic ====
Masayuki Gotō, a chairman of the Japan Racing Association, showed his gratitude to Umamusume: Pretty Derby for its positive influence on the horse racing community in an interview on Weekly Gallop published in December 2021. The franchise has also helped bring awareness to retired racehorses represented within the franchise, such as Haru Urara and Nice Nature, allowing them to receive donations from the franchise's fans.

As various stables in Japan housing the represented retired racehorses receive multiple visitors since its release, Cygames shared a list of rules and guidelines for fans potentially visiting the stables to adhere and follow. These guidelines include the inquiry of a stable's tour availability and accounting for the horse's wellbeing.

The franchise was also commented by media observers to contribute to a significant revival of horse racing pop culture, such as idol performances, slice-of-life elements, and a global sporting powerhouse. The popularity of the game's idol culture can be observed with various covers and dance videos of one of the game's songs, "Umapyoi Densetsu" (うまぴょい伝説, "Umapyoi Legend"), being uploaded to social media. In January 2023, "Umapyoi Densetsu" was awarded a Gold streaming certification by the Recording Industry Association of Japan for reaching over 50 million streams.

==== International ====
While Cygames was concerned about the niche nature of Umamusume impacting sales abroad, the title's global launch in June 2025 was met with positive reviews. Overseas players quickly became a significant share of the game's mobile revenue, which Cygames hoped would foster greater interest in horse racing outside Japan. The game saw a consistent rate of between 15,000 and 30,000 concurrent Steam players in its first week, as well as general high levels of interest from streamers and social media, leading to a marked increase in interest and awareness towards the game's characters' namesakes. According to IdolHorse, Umamusume and Griffin Johnson are key to growing the sport's popularity among Gen Z players.

Following its global release, cosplayers and fans of the franchise began appearing at horse racing events around the world, bringing in a younger audience to the sport. In the United States, meet-ups were held at Turf Paradise in Phoenix and at Tampa Bay Downs, with the latter also including the first cosplay races in North America after they had taken place in Japan, Southeast Asia and South America. Santa Anita Park in Los Angeles County also hosted meet-ups including during the Cygames-sponsored American Oaks and on the day of the Preakness Stakes on the other side of the country. The series has been credited with softening the sports' image of "an old man's sport and a gambling den". Cosplayers of the series have also appeared at horse racing events in Southeast Asia such as the Indonesia Derby, and have been endorsed by the events' organizers. At some venues or events, such as the Hipódromo de Monterrico in Peru and the Piala Raja Hamengkubuwono X of Indonesia, promoters have organised cosplay races on the track and fan art competitions portraying local racehorses. Cosplayers for the series have also appeared at other sports events and the Seattle Seahawks have, on multiple occasions, posted fanart of the series' characters playing football following the team's victories.

Since the franchise's inception, Cygames has sponsored several horseraces, including the aforementioned American Oaks, the Breeders' Cup Sprint since 2024, the Unbridled Sidney Stakes at Churchill Downs and the Grand Prix de Paris at Longchamp. The Breeders' Cup also expressed pride at its addition to the Japanese version of the game via a new scenario, "Beyond Dreams". A Japanese primer covering the country's efforts in sending racehorses to compete in the Breeders' Cup narrated by Miyu Kubota, the voice actor of the 2021 Filly & Mare Turf winner Loves Only You, was released to promote it and shared by both the franchise and the event. In addition, France Galop announced Cygames as a sponsor of the Prix de l'Arc de Triomphe in 2026, making it the first Japanese Premium Partner in the race's history.

==== Collaborations ====
In August 2021, Cygames and Paramount Pictures announced a collaboration in Japan between Umamusume: Pretty Derby and Top Gun: Maverick. Mayano Top Gun – whose namesake horse was also named in part after the original 1986 Top Gun film – was named a special advertising pilot, and the collaboration featured her in an alternate version of the movie's poster, with her voice actress, Mio Hoshitani, additionally interviewing some of the cast and crew of the movie.

A bilateral collaboration with Sega's Starhorse 4 was held on July 20, 2022, and February 2023. In Umamusume, it added background music, chat stamps, and a Career scenario titled "Grand Masters" – named after one of the most prestigious Starhorse races – which included the addition of race commentator Kiyoshi Sugimoto, who also commentates in the Starhorse series. The Satono Group is listed as a major figure in this as a reference to Satono Diamond and Satono Crown's owner being Hajime Satomi, the owner of Sega Sammy. It also featured the addition of Umamusume characters and features to Starhorse 4.

Collaborations with Japanese sports magazine Sports Graphic Number and horse racing magazine Weekly Gallop were released on October 20, 2022, and October 22, 2023, respectively, featuring special feature articles on the franchise, alongside special illustrations of several Umamusume characters.

In May 2025, the franchise was highlighted as part of an exhibit at the Smithsonian-affiliated International Museum of the Horse at the Kentucky Horse Park in Lexington, Kentucky. Titled Uma no Kokoro (馬の心, "Heart of the Horse"), the exhibit displays the Japanese horse world including horses' spiritual, cultural legacy, and sporting roles in the country. The exhibition was also held during the Expo 2025 in Osaka and the Annecy International Animation Film Festival in Annecy, France, in collaboration with France Galop ahead of Cygames Grand Prix de Paris.

In October 2025, as the Umamusume: Cinderella Gray anime adaptation aired on TBS at the same time as live action horse racing drama The Royal Family, Oguri Cap was featured in promotions alongside Umamusume personifications of Royal Family and Royal Hope, two of the main racehorses in the show.

In April 2026, Umamusume has a collaboration with Midori no Makibaō and Konami's Bombergirl for April Fools' Day. This collaboration commemorates the 30th anniversary and the 10th anniversary of the franchise and the fact that 2026 is the Year of the Horse, the collaboration also illustrated by Bkub Okawa alongside Silent Hill f collaboration campaign was announced in March. In September 2026, another collaboration campaign with Aniplex's Lycoris Recoil during the Tokyo Game Show event on its 4th anniversary of the original broadcast, alongside Umamusume: Cinderella Gray fans.

Alongside these, minor collaborations have been held. Haru Urara and Oguri Cap appeared in Cygames' Shadowverse card game as crossover characters. Select characters from the franchise were also chosen as participants in Love Live!'s 15th anniversary tribute album released in January 2026. Tokai Teio, Oguri Cap, Gold Ship, Still in Love and Almond Eye were named as the singers of a cover of "Bokura wa Ima no Naka de" by µ's, the opening theme of Season 1 of the School Idol Project anime.

The franchise has also sponsored motorsport teams and races. For the 2026 Super GT Series, Pacific Racing Team's BMW M4 used a livery depicting Special Week, Maruzensky, Rice Shower, Winning Ticket, Curren Chan, and Buena Vista. Umamusume was a primary sponsor of the 2026 Japanese motorcycle Grand Prix, placing signage around Mobility Resort Motegi while Oguri Cap's voice actress Tomoyo Takayanagi waved the checkered flag for the Moto2 and Moto3 races. Umamusume became a founding partner of the 2027 Japanese Grand Prix. The franchise also secured a one-year naming right for the 130R corner of the Suzuka Circuit, renaming it as the "Umamusume 130R" from November 20, 2026 onwards.

Among the cosplays at sporting events were a series of cosplays at Denver Broncos games, which led to not only an increase in popularity of the NFL team but also an official collaboration for the Broncos' 2026 Week 13 home game at Empower Field at Mile High against the Miami Dolphins.
