= Tales of Wedding Rings =

Japanese manga series and its adaptations)

- Cover of the first volume, featuring Hime

結婚指輪物語 (Kekkon Yubiwa Monogatari)
- Genre: Romantic fantasy
- Manga
- Written by: Maybe
- Published by: Square Enix
- English publisher: NA: Crunchyroll; Yen Press
- Magazine: Monthly Big Gangan
- Original run: March 25, 2014 – August 23, 2024
- Volumes: 15
- Anime television series
- Directed by: Takashi Naoya
- Produced by: Yoshihiro Ishikawa; Tsugu Ochiai; Yuusuke Oonuko; Tomoyuki Oowada; Shouta Watase; Kouji Sawahata; Shuuta Sasaki; Fumihiro Ozawa; Kouhei Yamada
- Written by: Deko Akao
- Music by: Satoshi Hōno
- Studio: Staple Entertainment
- Licensed by: Crunchyroll (streaming); SA/SEA: Medialink
- Original network: AT-X (uncensored); Tokyo MX, SUN, BS11 (censored)
- Original run: January 6, 2024 – December 27, 2025
- Episodes: 25
- icon

Tales of Wedding Rings (Japanese: 結婚指輪物語, Hepburn: Kekkon Yubiwa Monogatari) is a Japanese manga series written and illustrated by Maybe. It was serialized in Monthly Big Gangan from March 2014 to August 2024 and was published in fifteen tankōbon volumes. The series tells a story of a high school boy, Haruto Satou who falls in love with a young woman named Hime from another realm who moves back to her home world to get married and he crashes the wedding.

An anime television series adaptation produced by Staple Entertainment aired from January to March 2024. A second season aired from October to December 2025.

== Plot ==
Satou pines for his childhood friend Hime. One day, she says she is moving away, so he follows her into a portal where she is about to be married to a prince. When a demon attacks, Hime gives Satou her ring, granting him light-based powers he uses to defeat the demon. She explains she is a princess from another world who lived on Earth for her own safety. Her world is under attack by demons and she was destined to marry a hero and pass her ring to grant him power.

The prince was supposed to be the hero, but Satou usurped his position. The ring is one out of a set of five. To become powerful enough to save the world, he must marry four other princesses and gain their rings to get power over four of the elements: earth, fire, air, and water.

== Characters ==
Satou (サトウ, Satō)
Voiced by: Gen Satō (Japanese); Corey Wilder (English)
Hime (ヒメ)
Voiced by: Akari Kitō (Japanese); Ezra Vervin (English)
Nefritis Romca (ネフリティス, Nefuritisu)
Voiced by: Miyuri Shimabukuro (Japanese); Megan Shipman (English)
Granart Needakitta (グラナート, Guranāto)
Voiced by: Hitomi Ueda (Japanese); Cassie Ewulu (English)
Saphir Maasa (サフィール, Safīru)
Voiced by: Ai Kakuma (Japanese); Brittney Karbowski (English)
Amber Idanokan (アンバル, Anbaru)
Voiced by: Mikako Komatsu (Japanese); Vanessa Benoit (English)
Marse (マルス, Marusu)
Voiced by: Shogo Sakata (Japanese); Jeff Plunk (English)
Alabaster (アラバスタ, Arabasuta)
Voiced by: Shigeru Chiba (Japanese); Max Hartman (English)
Morion (モーリオン, Mōrion)
Voiced by: Miyu Tomita

== Media ==
=== Manga ===
Written and illustrated by Maybe, Tales of Wedding Rings was serialized in Monthly Big Gangan from March 25, 2014, to August 23, 2024, and collected into fifteen tankōbon volumes.

In May 2015, Crunchyroll announced they would add the series to their digital manga service Crunchyroll Manga. At Anime Expo 2017, Yen Press announced it had licensed the series for English publication.

==== Volumes ====
No.	Original release date	Original ISBN	English release date	English ISBN
1	December 9, 2014	978-4-75-754430-7	March 6, 2018	978-0-31-641616-0
2	May 25, 2015	978-4-75-754654-7	May 22, 2018	978-1-97-532654-8
3	December 25, 2015	978-4-75-754848-0	August 21, 2018	978-1-97-535408-4
4	October 25, 2016	978-4-75-755140-4	November 13, 2018	978-1-97-535409-1
5	June 24, 2017	978-4-75-755392-7	February 19, 2019	978-1-97-535410-7
6	February 24, 2018	978-4-75-755638-6	May 28, 2019	978-1-97-530422-5
7	September 25, 2018	978-4-75-755859-5	August 27, 2019	978-1-97-538508-8
8	July 9, 2019	978-4-75-756192-2	February 18, 2020	978-1-97-530670-0
9	May 25, 2020	978-4-75-756626-2	June 8, 2021	978-1-97-532450-6
10	January 25, 2021	978-4-75-757059-7	May 3, 2022	978-1-97-534076-6
11	August 25, 2021	978-4-7575-7437-3	September 20, 2022	978-1-9753-4739-0
12	March 25, 2022	978-4-7575-7843-2	August 22, 2023	978-1-9753-7185-2
13	January 25, 2023	978-4-7575-8358-0	December 12, 2023	978-1-9753-7533-1
14	December 25, 2023	978-4-7575-8977-3	September 17, 2024	979-8-8554-0130-1
15	September 25, 2024	978-4-7575-9438-8	October 28, 2025	979-8-8554-2047-0

=== Virtual reality ===
In November 2017, it was announced that a virtual reality version of the manga was in development. The adaptation was first released in March 2018 at Square Enix's AnimeJapan booth. It was made available on the HTC Vive on September 25, 2018.

=== Anime ===
In January 2023, an anime television series adaptation was announced. It is produced by Staple Entertainment and directed by Takashi Naoya, with series composition by Deko Akao, character designs handled by Saori Nakashiki, and music composed by Satoshi Hōno. The series aired from January 6 to March 23, 2024, on AT-X and other networks. The opening theme song is "Lover's Eye", performed by Sizuk, while the ending theme song is "Kokoro no Naka" (ココロノナカ; "In the Heart"), performed by AliA. Crunchyroll is streaming the series. Medialink licensed the series in South, Southeast Asia and Oceania (except Australia and New Zealand) and is streaming it on the Ani-One Asia YouTube channel.

A second season was announced after the airing of the final episode. The staff and cast from the first season are reprising their roles. The season aired from October 4 to December 27, 2025. The opening theme song is "Daybreak", performed by Sizuk, while the ending theme song is "any if", performed by Akari Kitō.

==== Episodes ====
===== Season 1 (2024) =====
No. overall	No. in season	Title	Directed by	Written by	Storyboarded by	Original release date
1	1	"Episode 1"	Matsuo Asami	Deko Akao	Takashi Naoya	January 6, 2024
Ten years ago Satou witnessed Hime and her grandfather Alabaster teleport to Japan from another world. In the present Satou and Hime are best friends, though Satou secretly is in love with Hime. However, he fears confessing his love as Hime possesses two rings meant for marrying her future husband. When Hime abruptly reveals she is returning home, Satou, unable to accept her absence, follows her to the teleportation circle where she reveals her real name is Princess Krystal of Light Kingdom and she is returning for an arranged marriage. Impulsively he follows her to the world of Arnalus and interrupts her wedding to Imperial Prince Marmarugius / Marse. The wedding is attacked by an Abyssal Demon seeking to assassinate Hime. Only Hime’s Ring of Light can defeat it, so she quickly saves Satou’s life by giving him the ring and a kiss. Marse throws Satou a sword, allowing him to slay the demon with Light magic. Satou is alarmed to learn he has unintentionally become Hime’s husband, Hero of Light and King of Light Kingdom. Despite the danger he decides to continue protecting Hime. Hime starts to develop her own feelings for Satou but reminds him their marriage is a formality so they will not be sharing a bed. More demons attack so Alabaster, revealed as Great Sage of the Light Kingdom, prepares Satou to fight once more.
2	2	"Episode 2"	Matsuo Asami	Deko Akao	Masayoshi Nishida	January 13, 2024
A knight of the Abyss King injures Satou. Alabaster explains the ring draws power from Satou and Hime’s marriage, and since they married only recently Satou is powerless before the knight. To protect both himself and the kingdom, Satou flees with Alabaster, Hime and Marse. Alabaster reveals Satou will need four more rings to achieve his full powers, so Satou will need to marry four princesses with rings from other kingdoms. Hime is not happy at this. The rings were crafted by the first Ring King to seal away the Abyss King generations ago. Each of his five wives received one ring each and founded the five kingdoms. Hime blames herself for Satou’s lack of power, but Satou finally confesses to her and Hime admits she loves him back. As they are too nervous to have sex they decide to date first. Alabaster is disappointed by their decision. Their first destination is Romca, kingdom of the elves whose princess holds the Wind Ring. Unfortunately 50 years ago a wind barrier appeared around Romca that prevents entry by any species except elves. Elven hunters show them an underground passage so they can meet the princess. Unfortunately, Princess Nephrites is terrified by anything from outside Romca, and when she learns Satou and Hime are married she runs away to be sick.
3	3	"Episode 3"	Ryo Nakamura	Deko Akao	Katsumi Terahigashi	January 20, 2024
Nephrites' brother Jade, who suffers from an extreme sister-complex, imprisons Satou. Satou is broken out by Peridot the elf Elder who believes the elves need to re-join the outside world. She sneaks him into the temple where the Wind Ring generates the barrier by drawing power from the petrified bodies of Nephrites' parents. After kidnapping Nephrites, Peridot assures Satou that Nephrites is stronger than she seems. Jade secures the ring, reasoning Satou can’t take it via marriage as long as Nephrites still hasn’t removed it from her mother’s finger. Satou is able to show Nephrites he is just an ordinary man who stumbled into his position due to falling in love with Hime. She admits she is curious about the world, so he offers to show her but won’t force her to marry him. She tries to stand up to Jade but is forced to obey him. Peridot reveals Nephrites' aunt should have inherited the ring, but when her human lover was murdered to keep him from inheriting the ring by marriage she fled the kingdom after cursing it to be destroyed. The ring was passed to her younger sister, Nephrites' mother, whose fear of the curse grew so great she and her husband made Nephrites promise never to leave the kingdom, then sacrificed their lives to create the barrier.
4	4	"Episode 4"	Ryo Nakamura	Deko Akao	Katsumi Terahigashi	January 27, 2024
An Abyss Knight breaks through the barrier. Satou battles the Knight to protect the kingdom but is still too weak. Hime realizes their marriage isn’t enough, overcomes her jealousy, and implores Nephrites to marry Satou. Nephrites shatters her parents' statues to retrieve their rings, one for herself and the Wind Ring for Satou, causing the barrier to vanish. With two rings the Knight is defeated and revealed to be Smaragdi, Nephrites' aunt who cursed the kingdom, revealed to have been enslaved by the Abyss King with an inferior copy of the Wind Ring. She fully apologizes for her actions. Later, while sharing a bath, Hime attempts to brag about their non-existent sex life to impress Nephrites, which backfires when Peridot joins them to demand details. Hime stubbornly offers Satou sex straight away, but he feels pressured due to Peridot watching and refuses. Alabaster informs Smaragdi her human lover wasn’t murdered, he chose to leave hoping her life would be easier without him being hated by her people, and is now an old man living in another kingdom. Nephrites chooses to go with Satou to see the world. Peridot is revealed to have been one of the original Ring Princesses and wife to the first Ring King hundreds of years ago. Smaragdi realizes her human lover who is now an old man was actually Alabaster himself.
5	5	"Episode 5"	Matsuo Asami	Natsu Yoshioka	Kōji Iwai	February 3, 2024
As they travel, Hime becomes increasingly jealous of Satou doting on Nephrites and has a nightmare of being separated from him. They stumble upon Needakitta, the moving kingdom of merchants and cat people whose princess holds the Fire Ring, disappointing Marse who wanted to go to the Water Kingdom first. After the boys and girls get separated, Nephrites apologizes to Hime for coming between her and Satou and assures her that Satou loves her. Satou is shocked when all the girls in the kingdom admire Marse but dismiss him as a weakling. They regroup at an arena where Princess Granart faces her suitors for she will only allow a man who can beat her in a fight to marry her. Satou challenges her, but is knocked out in one blow. Marse trains him in swordsmanship and Alabaster trains him in magic for a rematch, but he does not make much progress. Hime comforts him by assuring she does not mind if he is weak. In a mixed gender spa, Granart allows a shocked Satou to massage her nude body. As he does, she confides she is tired of fighting weak suitors. Since their cause of defeating the Abyss King is just, she offers to throw their rematch so she can marry him and give the Fire Ring. Insulted, he declares he will fight her for real and defeat her.
6	6	"Episode 6"	Matsuo Asami	Natsu Yoshioka	Masayoshi Nishida	February 10, 2024
Nephrites tries to seduce Satou, but is ignored. He is reluctant when she and Marse tell him to just use the Rings against Granart. As their rematch begins, a defeated, jealous suitor is tempted with a cursed ring by the Abyss King and turns into an Abyss Knight, attacking the event with several monsters. As Granart's guards slay the monsters, she takes the knight on, but he is protected by an aura of flames. Satou uses the Wind Ring to blow out the flames and the Light Ring to destroy the cursed ring and cure him of possession. Granart says he has proven himself worthy, but he insists on the duel. He starts losing, but insists on not using the Rings because he wants to win with his own power. Hime offers to have sex with him if he wins, firing him up, then a voice only he can hear gives him advice that allows him to win. Granart kisses him, gives the Fire Ring, and wants to have sex, but he says Hime is his first wife and he will do it with her first. They try to have sex, but he passes out from exhaustion, so she is satisfied with just sharing a bed with him. They later have a feast to celebrate Satou and Granart's marriage, but Hime drinks too much wine and Satou takes her to her room. He confides that he wants to return to Earth before they have sex and she allows him to fondle her breasts. Nephrites and Granart arrive and complain because they cannot have sex with Satou until Hime does.
7	7	"Episode 7"	Ryo Nakamura	Deko Akao	Takashi Naoya	February 17, 2024
The group reaches Maasa, capital of the Kingdom of Water. Satou is grabbed by a girl from the crowd who kisses him, granting him the Ring of Water as she is Princess Saphir of the dragon people. Saphir quickly drags him into her kingdoms politics; Maasa has no army so it utilizes soldiers from Marse's country, the Gisarus Empire. Unfortunately Marse's father the Emperor and older brother Prince Sluder are expanding the Empire’s territories and Saphir fears he intends to seize Maasa. Her father suffers from an illness weakening his mind, so he relies heavily on Sluder and a mysterious Seer. It transpires Saphir’s younger twin Saphira was supposed to be Ring Princess and marry the Ring King, which should have been Marse, but now she rejects him, believing he broke his promise to marry her by letting another man become Ring King. Saphir admits she married Satou so Saphira would be free to marry Marse, though that now seems unlikely. Saphir intends to prove the Seer is an Imperial agent, meanwhile the Seer orders Satou be assassinated. The assassins are foiled repeatedly by Granart and Alabaster. Marse admits to Satou he didn’t want to be Ring King as the responsibility was too much, plus it meant taking Hime away from Satou, which wouldn’t be right. Sluder pressures Marse to remain loyal to the Empire. Shortly after, the Seer passes Marse an order from the Emperor; during the next monster attack kill Satou and replace him as Ring King.
8	8	"Episode 8"	Ryo Nakamura	Deko Akao	Kōji Iwai	February 24, 2024
The Seer promises Marse that his father, the Emperor, will finally accept him if he fulfills his mission and gives him an anti-magic sword. As Marse remembers his father always berating him as a failure, the sword possesses him. Sluder leads troops to fend off a monster attack, but one slips through and attacks the palace. As Alabaster fights it, Marse attacks Satou. The voice tells Satou he can overwhelm the anti-magic sword and kill Marse, but he refuses. Believing in their friendship, Satou lets his arm get stabbed, which snaps Marse out of it, then destroys the cursed gem on the sword. Enraged, the Seer reveals herself as an Abyss Knight and the source of the monsters, then takes Saphira hostage. Satou and Marse rescue her, making her fall in love with Marse again, then Saphir kisses Satou and uses the Water Ring to turn into a dragon and devour the monster, forcing the Seer to flee. Saphir's father regains his health and mind. He tells Sluder that Maasa and Gisarus will have an equal partnership from now on, approves of Satou and Saphir's marriage, and gives Marse and Saphira permission to marry. The Seer reports to the Emperor and attempts to seduce him, but he kills her with his sword, saying he knew of her treachery. He declares he will kill anyone who stands in the way of his conquest, even the Abyss King and Ring King.
9	9	"Episode 9"	Matsuo Asami	Natsu Yoshioka	Masayoshi Nishida	March 2, 2024
The girls insist on sharing Satou’s bed every night. The voice tells Satou to stop resisting and take all four of them but Satou announces Hime will always be most important and invites her on a date without the others. Alabaster nags Satou to have sex with Hime on the date, meanwhile Hime also secretly hopes for this. The date, secretly being watched by the other girls in disguises, keeps being interrupted by people eager to meet the Ring King. At a park popular with couples they attempt a kiss but Satou is too nervous to do it in public. The other girls leave, disappointed nothing happened. Nephrites is happy she, Granart, and Saphir are becoming friends. Hime tells Satou that while she enjoyed the date the reality is she cannot keep him for herself and advises him to include all his wives in the future. Satou kisses her and for a moment they are tempted to find a hotel, but come to their senses and return to the palace. The next morning, they depart for Idanokan, the kingdom of the dwarves high in the mountains who hold the Earth Ring. Unfortunately, after the last war with the Abyss King the dwarves were almost wiped out and the few survivors hid underground, so Alabaster is unsure if there even exists a surviving dwarf princess or if she even possesses the Earth Ring.
10	10	"Episode 10"	Matsuo Asami	Natsu Yoshioka	Masayoshi Nishida	March 9, 2024
The group spend three days hiking through the mountains. At night Satou asks Alabaster why they are bothering to collect the rings when the Empire already opposes the Abyss King without the rings, and so far no one he has met has much faith in the power of the Ring King. Alabaster is certain all will work itself out when the time is right, though while Satou sleeps Alabaster fears he is failing as Great Sage. They finally reach Idanokan but find it in ruins, so they decide to start searching, hoping by some miracle to find the Earth Ring. Hime is certain someone is watching them. Exploring, they learn the dwarves specialized in crafting robots and other machines powered by magic, which includes Granart’s home the moving kingdom of Needakitta. One robot abruptly awakens, its power source recharged by another of the Abyss King's rings. Full of bitterness at the dwarves' extinction, it attacks Satou. It tries to convince him to give up fighting for others and return to his own world but Satou is determined to fight for Hime’s home and defeats the robot. Suddenly, all the cursed rings teleport to the Abyss King and revive him, and he sends an endless horde of Abyssal Demons against the group. Seeing the fight as hopeless, Alabaster teleports Satou and the girls to Japan, though Marse chooses to stay and fight by Alabaster's side. Satou and the girls settle in his apartment.
11	11	"Episode 11"	Ryo Nakamura	Deko Akao	Takashi Naoya	March 16, 2024
Hime found a letter from Alabaster directing her to his stored money and telling her to live happily with Satou. They get Nephrites, Granart, and Saphir modern clothing and help them get used to the modern world. Hime and Satou go back to school. At home, they are still too shy to have sex. One night, Amber Idanokan, who has the Earth Ring, appears to the two. She explains that before the dwarves went extinct, they created her, a robot modeled after the dwarf princess, and sent her to Earth to safeguard the Earth Ring until she met the Ring King. She is ready to send the group back to Arnalus, but Hime refuses due to not wanting Satou to be hurt and wanting to live happily ever after with him. Satou spends time with Amber and after she talks about duty, he makes up his mind and kisses her to gain the Earth Ring. He tells Hime that they must stop running away and defeat the Abyss King to truly live happy. They attempt to have sex, but Amber interrupts and creates a portal to Arnalus. Satou and the girls step through it.
12	12	"Episode 12"	Matsuo Asami	Deko Akao	Takashi Naoya	March 23, 2024
The group arrives in Idanokan to find soldiers fighting a desperate battle against the Abyss King and his demons. Satou plows through the demons to attack him. The voice makes his five rings combine into one to amplify their powers and he slices the Abyss King in half vertically. However, his left side that holds his cursed rings does not die, shocking even the voice, and he tortures an exhausted Satou. The girls save him, but are surrounded by demons. Satou dreams of marrying Hime and then being tortured by the Abyss King. He wakes up to find Alabaster and Smaragdi rescued them on a giant bird and the Abyss King retreated due to his injuries. They stop in a town and reunite with Marse. Alabaster says the cursed rings saved the Abyss King, then says in the past, the wives of the Ring King fought by his side, so they must train the girls and deepen their bonds. The girls try to seduce Satou, but he is still too nervous. Later, they visit the grave of Hime's parents. Her little sister Morion arrives to be her teacher in magic.

===== Season 2 (2025) =====
No. overall	No. in season	Title	Directed by	Written by	Storyboarded by	Original release date
13	1	"Episode 1"	Matsuo Asami	Deko Akao	Takashi Naoya	October 4, 2025
Alabaster explains Morion apprenticed to a Sage and is now a powerful sorceress. Granart insists she doesn't need to learn magic as she has her sword. Hime struggles to learn, so Morion has her kiss Satou to visualise the power flowing from the rings. Visualising the power Hime unseals her mother's magic staff. Morion becomes jealous of Hime and Satou. Nephrites kisses him next and gains powerful wind magic. Alabaster reveals they must visit three important places; the Elve's Great Library, the Imperial Mythic Armoury and the Magecraft Spire. On the way to the library they encounter Abyss demons but Satou collapses, infected with dark mana. Alabaster has Hime suppress it with Light Magic. Amber diagnoses it as a curse placed on Satou by the Abyss King, which will eventually destroy him. Granart considers learning magic. Satou asks who the Abyss King actually is. Morion claims no one really knows except that he is a being from the dark ages. Satou and Hime go for a walk and she admits him having multiple wives has been more fun than expected. That night they discuss sex, with Satou worrying about getting pregnant in the middle of a war since condoms don't exist. Eavesdropping, Morion is pleased she now has a way to manipulate them.
14	2	"Episode 2"	Matsuo Asami	Deko Akao	Kōji Iwai	October 11, 2025
The group reaches Romca where Smaragdi drags Alabaster away for a reunion. In the library Peridot retrieves her own diary detailing what happened between the Abyss King and first Ring King. She also shows then her greatest shame, the severed arm of the first Ring King. She explains he was not a great hero but an ordinary farmer who found a ring in his field that allowed him to use Light Magic against Abyss Demons. To increase his power he convinced the five kingdoms to wed him to their princesses, which included Peridot. At first he fought honourably and loved his wives, but constant war turned him into a brute obsessed with power and sex. The five races began to fear him conquering the world himself, so his wives severed his ring hand and destroyed him, but not before he cast curses upon the rings, ensuring their descendants would be bound to the future Ring King. The regrets of the first Ring King trapped in his severed hand suddenly bind to Satou's ring, increasing its power slightly. Satou starts to question if he should have more power since it corrupted the first Ring King. Peridot seals the library doors and tells Satou he will remain trapped forever unless he gains the power he needs by having sex with all of his wives. The girls agree it is finally time and draw straws to determine who will go first. Hime is disappointed she has drawn the fifth straw and must go last.
15	3	"Episode 3"	Matsuo Asami	Natsu Yoshioka	Masayoshi Nishida	October 18, 2025
Amber reassures Satou her primary goal is pregnancy, but it is too soon for that. Saphir goes next but her "get on with it" attitude and child-like body are off-putting, so she agrees it isn't going to happen yet. Nefritis had promised Hime could go first, so she settles for just kissing him. Granart insists she must help him grow stronger since she can't use magic. Satou realises she is insecure, so he assures her she is beautiful and strokes her cheek. It proves too overwhelming so she admits defeat and leaves. For her turn Morion gives Hime a contraceptive spell, since they don't have condoms. Peridot reminds them she is watching for scientific reasons. Satou insists he can't continue with her watching, so she fills the room with aphrodisiac gas, arousing the girls and Morion, who all dive on Satou. The Ring King assists Satou using magic to disperse the gas. Satou yells at Peridot that sex is something to enjoy, not a tool for power. This reminds Peridot of Hime's ancestor, who disagreed with killing their husband because it was not his fault he had to fight alone. Peridot admits she was wrong but insists they must find a way to open the door together. Nefritis finds a book on cat-people magic showing their mana is different. Granart wonders if the overwhelming feeling she had with Satou might have been her magic.
16	4	"Episode 4"	Matsuo Asami	Natsu Yoshioka	Masayoshi Nishida	October 25, 2025
A week later they still haven't opened the doors and Satou fears the world is in chaos while they are trapped there. The girls blame themselves and each other for not making Satou powerful enough to open the door. Morion finds herself attracted to him but tells herself it is the aphrodisiac gas. Satou is surprised when Morion reveals the contraceptive spell was incomplete without further research. Hime admits to herself she wants sex, so she invites Satou to take a bath with her but he refuses due to Morion's incomplete spell. Saphir believes Satou's lack of power might be Hime's fault; she is the wife he loves most, yet they don't trust each other enough to have a sex life and she sees his other wives as rivals instead of allies. Nefrites and Granart realise an Abyss spider has somehow entered the library. The others rush to help but become trapped in the webs. Granart admits her magic appeared when Satou aroused her, so she asks him to kiss her. Hime panics but remembers what Saphir told her about trust, so she agrees with Granart. Satou kisses her and she gains fire magic, helping him destroy the spider. They wonder if the spider's appearance means the Abyss King has gained enough power even his monsters can bypass the library's defences.
17	5	"Episode 5"	Ryō Nakamura	Deko Akao	Kōji Iwai	November 1, 2025
Hime informs the others she will stop demanding she do everything with Satou first, as it has prevented him growing his relationship with the others. The girls decide to let things happen naturally from now on. Their sudden agreement increases Satou's power, who is curious what they did while he wasn't there. With his new power Satou destroys the library door. Peridot is surprised the bond between the princesses was so important as it was something she never considered with her husband's other wives. They retrieve Alabaster, physically exhausted from his reunion with Smaragdi. They reach the Empire and meet Prince Sluder. Alabaster requests access to the Armoury to retrieve the Ring King's Sword. The Emperor refuses, claiming giving a sword to a coward is pointless as only his Knights have been holding back the Abyss army. He demands Satou leave or he will cut off his ring hand. Hime suggests Satou, Alabaster, Saphir and Amber stay in the Empire while she, Morion, Nefrites and Granart go to the Magecraft Spire for magic training. Despite the risk Alabaster agrees it is the best choice. Morion wonders if Satou can take more wives than just the Ring Princesses. Marse and Saphira visit Satou with news security around the Armoury will be reduced during an upcoming ceremony as more knights are sent to fight on the front lines.
18	6	"Episode 6"	Matsuo Asami	Deko Akao	Katsumi Terahigashi	November 8, 2025
Morion introduces Professor Perlee, their great aunt who taught magic to their mother. She introduces Granart and Nefrites to instructors in Fire and Wind magic. Perlee admits Hime's mother would have been a better instructor as Light magic can only be used by the Light Princess and the Ring King, so her training will be trial and error until she figures it out. Morion admits seeing Hime with Satou makes her envious for a normal romance. A week later Hime has made no progress while Nefrites has made a little. Granart makes progress but is injured regularly as her instructor turns out to be her mother Rubyn. Having left when Granart was young, Rubyn swings between training her aggressively and treating her like a child. Another Spire student claims she has researched Light magic. She explains Light magic comes from the instinctive desire to exist in the physical world that all living beings possess. She suddenly disappears, but having been made aware of her own instinct to exist Hime suddenly uses Light magic. Perlee is astonished at her sudden improvement but suspicious of the anonymous Light researcher. Meanwhile, Marse shows Satou around the city and a weapons factory. Satou learns despite the Emperor's attitude towards him the citizens see him as an ally. Feeling better, Satou decides to try his best infiltrating the Armoury.
19	7	"Episode 7"	Ryō Nakamura	Natsu Yoshioka	Masayoshi Nishida	November 15, 2025
Satou, Amber and Marse enter the Armoury but find the Emperor already there. He admits all objects within the Armoury are lies, ordinary weapons with famous stories and nothing more. He shows them the Ring King's sword, made of ordinary steel rusty with age. Nearby, the Emperor points out the Nokanatika Royal Light Sword used by Hime's father until he died fighting the Abyss. The sword didn't save him, so the Emperor chose to focus on military might over legends. He advises Satou not to trust Alabaster completely, as he has much grief in his heart and is obsessed with the Ring King. He also claims Satou is looking for power in useless objects instead of mastering the power he already has. Satou takes the Nokanatika sword while Marse takes the anti-magic sword the Seer manipulated him with. Amber detects Satou has found a new sense of responsibility. Morion becomes suspicious of Hime's growing power and is shocked to discover the Light Researcher is a disguised Abyss Apostle. The Apostle convinces Hime to open her heart, exposing her darkest jealousy of the other girls and desire to be alone with Satou. Morion and Perlee are unable to stop Hime turning into an Abyss Knight. The Apostle urges her to serve the Abyss King, but surprisingly Hime refuses, so the Apostle flees. Hime collapses the Spire and generates a sinister one in its place. Satou arrives with the others and learns Hime is waiting for him inside the Spire.
20	8	"Episode 8"	Matsuo Asami	Natsu Yoshioka	Kōji Iwai	November 22, 2025
Morion informs Satou the Spire is a manifestation of Hime's heart where Satou must heal her emotional pain. The Abyss King sends an army for Hime so Satou enters the Spire. Satou encounters Hime in a wedding dress asking to marry him. Satou remembers that as well as Ring King and Light Princess he and Hime are just two normal people in love. A naked Hime tries to seduce him, but he remembers there is more to love than sex. Satou meets a normal Hime, his childhood friend he first fell in love with, but he also rejects her as she is not the one he loves now. Next he sees Hime as a child whom he decided it was his job to protect. He suddenly realises which Hime he has been looking for and confronts the real Hime. Satou grabs her, claiming she is the one who needs him most. Hime traps them in an abyss cocoon. Alabaster senses Satou's life force disappearing, as does the fake Light Researcher who summons an immense Abyss Demon to crush the Spire. Hime shows Satou the Abyss, a vast emptiness where it is just the two of them and nothing that can take him away from her, just them for eternity. Satou realises Hime's pain comes from fear of losing him, while he used his duties as Ring King to avoid getting too close to her, making her afraid they had no future together. Satou decides to show her that future exists by finally having sex with her.
21	9	"Episode 9"	Ryō Nakamura	Deko Akao	Masayoshi Nishida	November 29, 2025
Satou admits he let his responsibilities give him cold feet concerning sex, but he is determined to surpass it. Hime realises she can be happy as long as Satou is in her life. Their rings resonate in a burst of light that destroys the Spire and the demons. They agree it is too important to delay any longer, both for the power and for themselves. The light grows even brighter and Alabaster is relieved they have finally "done it". Afterwards, Hime admits a part of her still wishes they could have stayed in the Abyss but she is glad she is now Satou's wife for real. Satou regrets his former cowardice and promises to be honest about what he wants, so they make love again. An entire night later they reappear. Alabaster believes they are ready to face the Abyss King. The others realise Satou and Hime had sex. Amber confirms she sensed they did it nine times in one night. At first the others are ready to have sex with him as well, but decide his current feelings for Hime can't be disturbed in case it effects their Light Magic, which is currently at its strongest. Needakitta's travelling caravans suddenly appear, having been hired by the Emperor to escort Satou to The Great Mountain Wall, front line of the war against the Abyss King.
22	10	"Episode 10"	Matsuo Asami	Natsu Yoshioka	Masayoshi Nishida	December 6, 2025
Morion is surprised Hime and Satou haven’t had sex again, though Hime claims Needakitta has no privacy. Nefrites struggles with jealousy. Satou and Hime manage to have sex in private, unaware Granart and Nefrites were spying on them. Needakitta stops at Maasa before making the journey to the Mountain Wall. Satou learns Saphira and Marse are expecting a baby. Marse intends to join the battle to ensure a future for his child. Satou arrives at the Mountain Wall and learns the soldiers will be keeping the Abyss army busy while Satou’s group use dwarven tunnels to reach Vanna, the Abyss King’s domain. Amber finds herself drawn to certain areas by instinct. Alabaster reveals that people only assume the dwarves all died, when in fact they disappeared, leaving no bodies. Amber leads them to a large stone structure where a tablet recites the dwarves last message. In the last war the Abyss King cursed the dwarves to lose their will to exist, ensuring they would be claimed by the Abyss. The structure opens, revealing a statue of a female dwarf. She explains that while most dwarves gave in to despair a few kept enough hope to build Amber to become the mother of the next generation of dwarves. The statue passes Amber a key, promising it will grant her strength when she needs it. She also reveals the last few dwarves managed to teleport to an alternate world. Satou and the others leave the room and the statue admits to Amber she is actually the last Princess of the dwarves. They make it through the tunnels and finally reach Vanna.
23	11	"Episode 11"	Shigeyasu Yamauchi	Deko Akao	Shigeyasu Yamauchi	December 13, 2025
Having not been noticed the group decide to rest before heading deeper into Vanna. Alabaster takes Marse and Morion for a walk and advises Satou to "make sure he has as much power as possible". Satou asks the girls for their honest feelings one last time. Nefrites is grateful he helped her see the world. Granart is happy she got to fall in love with a warrior. Saphir is content with having done her duty. Amber is proud to be carrying out the will of the dwarves. Hime is surprised when everyone kisses Satou and she doesn't become jealous. Instead, she becomes embarrassed when the other four leave so she can have sex with him. The next morning they cross into the Abyss Domain and find the Abyss King's fortress is the long lost Needakitta royal castle from before they began traveling in caravans. After fighting past the army of demons Amber uses the power of the dwarves key to summon a titanic golem and smash their way into the castle. Alabaster, Marse and Morion stay behind to guard their escape route. In the throne room, the Abyss King reveals his own rings are empowered by his five Generals, all modeled after the first Ring Princesses, meaning each of the girls must face and defeat their own ancestors. The Abyss King looks forward to seeing what Satou can do alone once his Light power runs out.
24	12	"Episode 12"	Matsuo Asami	Natsu Yoshioka	Masayoshi Nishida	December 20, 2025
During their fights with the Generals the girls are each offered what they want most; strength, knowledge, nobility and survival of the dwarf species, but they reject it all for Satou. Satou manages to destroy the King’s mask, causing four of his Generals to vanish. The King is revealed to be the Former Ring King, his body having fused with the Abyss King when he was sealed by his wives. The King claims Satou’s power won’t last as it will waver whenever he feels doubt. Satou momentarily lets that doubt confuse him, allowing the King to plunge him into the Abyss. Hime demands to know why her ancestor, the fake Light Researcher, didn’t disappear with the other Generals. In the Abyss the King informs Satou all Light is temporary, only the Abyss is eternal and everything must return to it. Alabaster believes they could seal the King while he and Satou are within the Abyss, but this would mean sacrificing Satou. Saphir accuses Alabaster of knowing beforehand they might have to sacrifice Satou to achieve victory. At that moment, the Empire’s army appears with warriors from every kingdom, having pushed the Demons all the way from the Mountain Wall to Vanna to support Satou. The girls realise the Abyss almost made them lose their faith in Satou, so they rejoin the battle. Satou is absorbed by the Abyss and vanishes, leaving only his Ring. Hime’s ancestor informs her Satou is gone.
25	13	"Episode 13"	Matsuo Asami	Deko Akao	Takashi Naoya	December 27, 2025
Hime refuses to believe Satou is gone and follows her magic into the Abyss, shocking her ancestor. Deep within the Abyss Hime pulls Satou’s soul back from oblivion, restoring him. To the King’s disbelief Hime takes the lead, with Satou providing power to her instead. Combining his sword and her staff they impale the King, defeating him. The King realises Light was never meant to defeat evil, it was meant to fill the Abyss with Creation. As he fades Hime’s ancestor appears and they depart for the Afterlife together. The King within Satou’s ring suddenly warns them they have only defeated the Abyss King, but the Abyss itself is still growing. Satou borrows his wives power and completely fills the Abyss with Light, banishing it forever. Satou faints and awakens in Needakitta just as the caravans arrive in Nokanatika where the girls reunite with their families during the massive celebration. Satou notices people suddenly treating him differently, with Alabaster explaining with the Abyss King gone Satou is the most powerful being alive, and he is technically King of all five Kingdoms, so people are understandably nervous. Satou doubts he is capable of wielding such power. That night the Emperor sends assassins to murder Satou, ensuring Satou can’t abuse his power in a world that doesn’t need him anymore. However, the assassins discover Satou and the girls have vanished, having decided to go on their honeymoon. They are shown living in Japan, with Alabaster and Morion tutoring Satou to ensure he becomes an effective and trustworthy king. Satou reflects that he truly loves Hime and they share a kiss.

== Reception ==
Rebecca Silverman from Anime News Network praised the characters, fan service, and use of body language, while criticizing characters' facial expressions and the story's direction. Brandon Varnell from The Fandom Post also praised the series, especially the plot due to it not sticking to trends established by other works. Takato from Manga News also offered praise for the story, calling it a promising start. Aurélien Pigeat from Actua BD was more critical, fearing the series would abuse other plot elements common in this type of work.

== See also ==
- Dusk Maiden of Amnesia, another manga series by the same creator
- To the Abandoned Sacred Beasts, another manga series by the same creator
