= Genesis of Aquarion (OVA) =

2007 original video animation

創星のアクエリオン (Sōsei no Akuerion)
- Genre: Action, Romance, Mecha
- Original video animation

Genesis of Aquarion
- Directed by: Shoji Kawamori
- Studio: Satelight
- Released: 25 May 2007 – 22 November 2007
- Runtime: 50 minutes
- Episodes: 2
- Anime film

Gekijōban Aquarion
- Directed by: Shoji Kawamori
- Studio: Satelight
- Released: September 15, 2007
- Runtime: 120 minutes

Genesis of Aquarion (創星のアクエリオン, Sōsei no Akuerion) is an original video animation (OVA) series created and directed by Shoji Kawamori and produced by Satelight studio. It is an alternative retelling (and prequel during the final scene which seem to reboot the story in another universe) of the Genesis of Aquarion television series, divided into two parts, Genesis of Aquarion: Wings of Betrayal (創星のアクエリオン 裏切りの翼, Sōsei no Akuerion Uragiri no Tsubasa) and Genesis of Aquarion: Wings of Glory (創星のアクエリオン 太陽の翼, Sōsei no Akuerion Taiyō no Tsubasa). A film compilation with some added and deleted footage and also bonus episode of the original series was released, titled Genesis of Aquarion: Wings of Genesis (劇場版アクエリオン, Gekijouban Aquarion Ippatsu Gyakuten Hen).

== Plot ==
In the past the Angels lived free on Earth's surface. They hunted humans to feed on their vital energy, called Prana. This was true until mankind decided to rise against them with the aid of Apollonius; a powerful Angel who sided with humanity against his peers. Apollonius had fallen in love with a woman called Celiane.

Together Apollonius, Celiane, and a human noble called Scorpius battled the Angels riding a giant humanoid machine; the Mechanical Angel Aquarion. Their valiant efforts lead to the Angels' defeat and their subsequent confinement in their icy prison. However Scorpius had a desire to become an angel himself and it caused him to betray and kill his comrade Apollonius.

12,000 years have passed and the Angels have reappeared to threaten mankind once more, kidnapping humans from entire cities around the globe in order to use their Prana to bring their people back to life. Deava, an international organization created to fight the Angels using replicas of the original Aquarion had little success so far. But when the reincarnations of Apollonius, Celiane and Scorpius finally meet together, the real Aquarion reappears on Earth, and the wheels of fate start to turn once more.

== Characters ==
- Apollo: The main protagonist and reincarnation of the Angel Apollonius. He lived in a forest with his grandfather until his death two years ago. Since then he has lived by himself until meeting Reika and Silvia. His personality differs in this story, as the Apollo from the original series was loud and easily angered, this Apollo is calmer and has shown restraint when dealing with certain situations. He also has a great sense of empathy to plants and animals. At first he showed no consideration for the war between humans and Angels as the humans tend to fight without caring about their surroundings; damaging the wildlife in the process. But when his memories from his former life awakens and he ends up obliged to take action in the conflict, he discovers the world and its problems are bigger than the little forest where he was raised.
- Silvia de Alisia: A noble from the Alisia family and reincarnation of Apollonius's human lover Celiane, she was tricked by Touma into thinking she was the reincarnation of Scorpius. Devastated with the death of her older brother Sirius in the war against the Angels, Silvia found new strength to fight after meeting Apollo and Aquarion.
- Hong Lihua: Best known as Reika. Just like Apollo and Silvia, visions of her past life appear little by little before her. She thought she was the reincarnation of Celiane because she saw Celiane's face as Scorpious killed Apollonius, she is actually the reincarnation of Scorpius.
- Touma: An Angel and the main antagonist. His objective is to harvest enough Prana from mankind to bring his fellow Angels back to life, with the aid of his loyal servant Otoha, who is also in love with him. But his plans change when the reincarnation of Apollonius finally is revealed, because of his love for him.

== Cast ==
Voice Actors of the Aquarion series reprise their roles for their respective characters in the OVA.

- Takuma Terashima as Apollo and Apollonius
- Yumi Kakazu as Silvia De Alisia and Celiane
- Tomokazu Sugita as Sirius De Alisia
- Sanae Kobayashi as Hong Lihua/Reika
- Mitsuki Saiga as Scorpius
- Masaya Onosaka as Pierre Vieira
- Tsugumi Higasayama as Tsugumi Rosenmeier
- Daisuke Sakaguchi as Jun Lee
- Yuuto Kazama as Glen Anderson
- Hiromi Satou as Rena Rune
- Romi Park as Chloe Klick and Kurt Klick
- Unshou Ishizuka as Gen Fudou
- Nobuo Tobita as Jean-Jerome Jorge
- Sakiko Tamagawa as Sophia Belin
- Toshiyuki Morikawa as Touma
- Mako Hyoudou as Otoha
