= Hitomi Ueda =

Japanese voice actress

- 上田 瞳
- Born: 29 July; Kyoto Prefecture, Japan
- Education: Doshisha University
- Occupation: Voice actress
- Years active: 2010–present
- Agent: Aoni Production
- Notable work: Umamusume: Pretty Derby as Gold Ship; Warlords of Sigrdrifa as Leyli Haltija; Tonikawa: Over the Moon for You – High School Days as Hakase Inukai; Tales of Wedding Rings as Granart; Yakuza Fiancé as Yoshino Somei

Hitomi Ueda (Japanese: 上田 瞳, Hepburn: Ueda Hitomi; born 29 July) is a Japanese voice actress affiliated with Aoni Production. After graduating from Aonijuku's Osaka campus, she debuted as a voice actress and has starred as Gold Ship in Umamusume: Pretty Derby, Leyli Haltija in Warlords of Sigrdrifa, Hakase Inukai in Tonikawa: Over the Moon for You – High School Days, Granart in Tales of Wedding Rings, and Yoshino Somei in Yakuza Fiancé.

== Biography ==
Hitomi Ueda, a native of Kyoto Prefecture, was born on 29 July. She was educated at the Doshisha University Faculty of Policy Studies, where she was a member of the sailing club.

As a junior high school student, Ueda heard Kazuya Nakai's narration and realized the diverse range of work by voice actors, so she started to consider a voice acting career. A member of the 30th graduating class of Aonijuku's Osaka campus, she joined Aoni Production, and her first named role was as Aki Hiyami in World Trigger. In November 2017, it was announced that she would voice Daizu, a main character in the anime Mameneko. She later starred as Gold Ship in Umamusume: Pretty Derby (reprising her role from the video game), Leyli Haltija in Warlords of Sigrdrifa and Hakase Inukai in Tonikawa: Over the Moon for You – High School Days. In March 2022, she won the voice actor category at the 2021 Famitsu Dengeki Game Awards for her role as Gold Ship. In 2024, she voiced Utsuro in Shy and starred as Granart in Tales of Wedding Rings.

Ueda's special skills are mochi pounding and air guitar.

== Filmography ==
=== Animated television ===
Year	Title	Role(s)	Ref.
2015	World Trigger	Aki Hiyami	
2016	Digimon Universe: App Monsters	Announcer	
2016	Kiss Him, Not Me	Referee	
2016	Mysterious Joker	Daughter	
2016	Natsume's Book of Friends	Nanako's friends, etc.	
2017	Case Closed	Norio Kobashi	
2017	Monster Hunter Stories: Ride On	Second daughter	
2018	Holmes of Kyoto	Kumi Ōishi	
2018	Mameneko	Daizu	
2018	Umamusume: Pretty Derby	Gold Ship	
2020	Warlords of Sigrdrifa	Leyli Haltija	
2020	Yashahime	Gyokuto	
2021	One Piece	Kamakirigirl	
2022	Chainsaw Man	Tendo	
2022	Phantom of the Idol	Kasenjiki	
2022	Lucifer and the Biscuit Hammer	Animus (young)	
2024	Mayonaka Punch	Tokage	
2024	Shy	Utsuro	
2024	Tales of Wedding Rings	Granart	
2024	The Wrong Way to Use Healing Magic	Amila	
2024	Failure Frame: I Became the Strongest and Annihilated Everything with Low-Level Spells	Eve Speed	
2024	Yakuza Fiancé: Raise wa Tanin ga Ii	Yoshino Somei	
2025	Übel Blatt	Altea	
2025	Beheneko: The Elf-Girl's Cat Is Secretly an S-Ranked Monster!	Stella	
2025	From Old Country Bumpkin to Master Swordsman	Surena Lysandra	
2025	The Shy Hero and the Assassin Princesses	Anemone	
2026	Hanaori-san Still Wants to Fight in the Next Life	Matsurika Nagamori	
2026	Nia Liston: The Merciless Maiden	Raffine Silver	
2027	My Sword Saint Master Is Too Cute to Live With!	Cordelia Dawson, Narrator	
2027	Murciélago	Kuroko Kōmori	

=== Original net animation ===
Year	Title	Role(s)	Ref.
2023	Tonikawa: Over the Moon for You – High School Days	Hakase Inukai	
2024	Negative Happy	Ayase/Ayase Ito	

=== Video games ===
Year	Title	Role(s)	Ref.
2017	Umamusume: Pretty Derby	Gold Ship	
2018	Fist of the North Star: Lost Paradise	Ruka	
2018	Robot Girls Z Online	Death Cross V9	
2020	Arknights	Ashlock	
2022	Goddess of Victory: Nikke	Brid/iDoll FLower	
2022	Guardian Tales	Destroyer Pymon	
2023	404 Game Re:set	Columns	
2025	Wuthering Waves	Zani	
2025	Dynasty Warriors: Origins	Diao Chan	
2025	Trickcal: Chibi Go	Velvet, BigWood	
2026	ANOMALITH	Reona Minazuki	
2026	Honkai: Nexus Anima	Olympia	

=== Dubbing ===
- Primate, Kate
