= Satelight =

Japanese animation studio

Satelight, Inc.
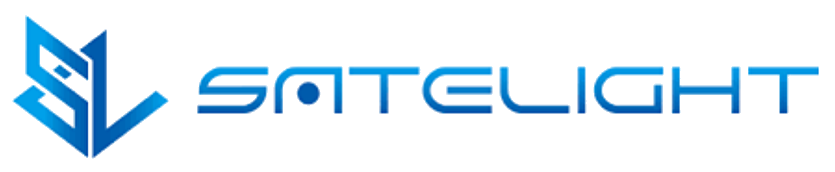
- Native name: 株式会社サテライト
- Romanized name: Kabushiki-gaisha Sateraito
- Type: Kabushiki gaisha
- Industry: Japanese animation
- Founded: December 1995; 30 years ago in Sapporo, Hokkaidō
- Founders: Tsuneo Maeda
- Headquarters: 1-2-1 Asagaya Kita, Suginami-ku, Tokyo, Japan
- Area served: Japan
- Key people: Michiaki Satō (Note: CEO, Representative Director); Shintaro Shibuya (Note: Executive Director); Shōji Kawamori (Note: Special Adviser)
- Number of employees: 100
- Divisions: Digital Department (Note: Satelight Digital Department (サテライトデジタル部), the studio's 3DCG and compositing department.); Editing Office (Note: Satelight Editing Office (サテライト編集室), the studio's editing department.); Fukushima (2024-) (Note: Satelight Fukushima Studio (サテライト福島スタジオ), the studio's Fukushima branch.); Nagoya (200?–2010) (Note: Satelight Nagoya (サテライト名古屋), the studio's Nagoya branch.); Osaka (200?–2008) (Note: Satelight Osaka (サテライト大阪), the studio's Osaka branch. The studio became independent and renamed itself to GoHands in 2008.)
- Subsidiaries: Studio Sound Bee (Note: Studio Sound Bee, a sound production studio founded in November 2022 as a joint venture with Dax Production.); GeyeG Pictures (Note: GeyeG Pictures, a subsidiarized animation studio founded in May 2026 by producer Hideaki Hata with most of the staff transferring from Studio Mother.)
- Website: www.satelight.co.jp/en/

Satelight, Inc. (Japanese: 株式会社サテライト, Hepburn: Kabushiki-gaisha Sateraito) is a Japanese animation studio. Aside from several stand-alone projects, the studio is well known for producing the Aquarion and Symphogear franchises, as well as later installments of the Macross franchise. The company's Representative Director is Michiaki Satō. The noted anime director and creator Shōji Kawamori is a special adviser at the studio. The name Satelight consists of S for Sapporo, A for Animate, T for Technology, and E for Entertainment.

== History ==
The studio was founded in late 1995, in Sapporo, Hokkaidō, their first project being Bit the Cupid, the world's first fully digitally-animated television series.

In August 2006, Satelight was acquired by pachinko maker Sankyo and served as its subsidiary until July 2020, when the capital alliance between Sankyo and the studio ended. In October that same year, Satelight announced a capital and business alliance with NetEase.

In November 2022, Satelight and audio production company Dax Production jointly announced the establishment of audio production studio Studio Sound Bee.

== Works ==
=== Television series ===
No.	Title	Year(s)	Notes
1	Earth Maiden Arjuna	January 9, 2001 – March 27, 2001	
2	Geneshaft	April 5, 2001 – June 28, 2001	Co-production with Studio Gazelle.
3	Heat Guy J	October 1, 2002 – March 25, 2003	
4	Genesis of Aquarion	April 4, 2005 – September 26, 2005	
5	Noein: To Your Other Self	October 12, 2005 – March 29, 2006	
6	Glass Fleet	April 4, 2006 – September 21, 2006	Co-production with Gonzo
7	Koi suru Tenshi Angelique: Kokoro no Mezameru Toki	July 8, 2006 – September 30, 2006	
8	Galaxy Angel Rune	October 1, 2006 – December 24, 2006	
9	Koi suru Tenshi Angelique ~ Kagayaki no Ashita ~	January 5, 2007 – March 23, 2007	
10	Engage Planet Kiss Dum	April 3, 2007 – September 25, 2007	
11	Kamichama Karin	April 6, 2007 – September 29, 2007	
12	Shugo Chara!	October 6, 2007 – September 27, 2008	
13	Time Jam: Valerian & Laureline	October 20, 2007 – March 5, 2008	Co-production with EuropaCorp and Dargaud)
14	Macross Frontier	April 4, 2008 – September 26, 2008	
15	Shugo Chara!! Doki—	October 4, 2008 – September 26, 2009	
16	Legends of the Dark King: A Fist of the North Star Story	October 10, 2008 – December 25, 2008	
17	Basquash!	April 3, 2009 – October 1, 2009	
18	The Guin Saga	April 5, 2009 – September 27, 2009	
19	Shugo Chara! Party!	October 3, 2009 – March 27, 2010	
20	Anyamaru Tantei Kiruminzuu	October 5, 2009 – September 20, 2010	Co-production with Hal Film Maker (1–11) and JM Animation
21	Fairy Tail	October 12, 2009 – March 30, 2013, episodes 1–175, co-production with A-1 Pictures (first series)	
22	Kiddy Girl-and	October 15, 2009 – March 25, 2010	
23	Croisée in a Foreign Labyrinth	July 4, 2011 – September 19, 2011	
24	Senki Zesshō Symphogear	January 6, 2012 – March 30, 2012	With Encourage Films) and Studio Pastoral (#3) (Note: During the broadcast release of the series, Satelight was originally credited as アニメーション制作協力 (Animation Work Assistance) for the first two episodes of the series, and thereafter credited as アニメーション制作 (Animation Work). In the Blu-Ray release, however, Satelight is credited for Animation Work in the first two episodes as well.)
25	Aquarion Evol	January 8, 2012 – June 24, 2012	Co-production with Eight Bit
26	Bodacious Space Pirates	January 8, 2012 – June 30, 2012	
27	AKB0048	April 29, 2012 – July 22, 2012	
28	Muv-Luv Alternative: Total Eclipse	July 2, 2012 – December 23, 2012	Co-production with ixtl
29	AKB0048 next stage	January 5, 2013 – March 30, 2013	
30	Arata: The Legend	April 9, 2013 – July 1, 2013	
31	Senki Zesshō Symphogear G	July 4, 2013 – September 26, 2013	
32	Log Horizon	October 5, 2013 – March 22, 2014	
33	White Album 2	October 6, 2013 – December 29, 2013	
34	Nobunaga the Fool	January 5, 2014 – June 22, 2014	
35	M3: The Dark Metal	April 21, 2014 – October 1, 2014	Co-production with C2C
36	Lord Marksman and Vanadis	October 4, 2014 – December 27, 2014	
37	The Disappearance of Nagato Yuki-chan	April 3, 2015 – July 17, 2015	
38	Aquarion Logos	July 2, 2015 – December 24, 2015	Co-production with C2C
39	Senki Zesshō Symphogear GX	July 4, 2015 – September 25, 2015	
40	Ragnastrike Angels	April 3, 2016 – June 19, 2016	
41	Macross Delta	April 3, 2016 – September 25, 2016	
42	Scared Rider Xechs	July 5, 2016 – September 20, 2016	
43	Nanbaka	October 5, 2016 – March 22, 2017	
44	WorldEnd	April 11, 2017 – June 27, 2017	Co-production with C2C
45	Senki Zesshō Symphogear AXZ	July 1, 2017 – September 30, 2017	
46	Hakata Tonkotsu Ramens	January 12, 2018 – March 30, 2018	
47	Last Hope	April 4, 2018 – September 26, 2018	
48	Caligula	April 8, 2018 – June 24, 2018	
49	Girly Air Force	January 10, 2019 – March 28, 2019	
50	Senki Zesshō Symphogear XV	July 6, 2019 – September 28, 2019	
51	Somali and the Forest Spirit	January 9, 2020 – March 26, 2020	Co-production with Hornets
52	Sakugan	October 7, 2021 – December 23, 2021	
53	Black Summoner	July 9, 2022 – September 24, 2022	
54	Rokudo's Bad Girls	April 8, 2023 – June 24, 2023	
55	Helck	July 12, 2023 – December 20, 2023	
56	Cherry Magic! Thirty Years of Virginity Can Make You a Wizard?!	January 11, 2024 – March 28, 2024	
57	Tasūketsu: Fate of the Majority	July 3, 2024 – December 25, 2024	
58	A Terrified Teacher at Ghoul School!	October 8, 2024 – March 25, 2025	
59	Aquarion: Myth of Emotions	January 10, 2025 – March 28, 2025	
60	Übel Blatt	January 11, 2025 – March 29, 2025	Co-production with Staple Entertainment
61	The Red Ranger Becomes an Adventurer in Another World	January 12, 2025 – March 30, 2025	
62	Kirio Fan Club	April 2, 2026 – June 18, 2026	
63	Drops of God	April 10, 2026 – September 18, 2026	
64	Psyren	October 5, 2026 – present	
65	Murciélago	January 2027 – scheduled	Co-production with Staple Entertainment

=== OVAs/ONAs ===
No.	Title	Year(s)	Notes
1	Macross Zero	December 21, 2002 – October 2004	
2	Hellsing Ultimate	February 10, 2006 – February 22, 2008	Episodes 1–4
3	Baldr Force EXE: Resolution	October 11, 2006 – April 4, 2007	
4	Genesis of Aquarion: Wings of Betrayal	May 25, 2007	
5	Genesis of Aquarion: Wings of Glory	November 22, 2007	
6	Air Gear OVAs	November 17, 2010 – June 17, 2011	
7	Momokuri	December 24, 2015 – February 4, 2016	
8	100 Sleeping Princes and the Kingdom of Dreams	March 25, 2017 – December 23, 2017	
9	Final Fantasy XV: Episode Ardyn - Prologue	February 17, 2019	
10	Cannon Busters	August 15, 2019	Co-production with Yumeta Company

=== Anime films ===
No.	Title	Year(s)	Notes
1	Genesis of Aquarion: Wings of Genesis	September 15, 2007	
2	Macross Frontier the Movie ~Itsuwari no Utahime~	November 21, 2009	Co-production with Eight Bit.
3	Macross Frontier the Movie ~Sayonara no Tsubasa~	February 26, 2011	
4	Macross Delta: Passionate Walküre	February 9, 2018	
5	For Whom the Alchemist Exists	June 14, 2019	
6	Macross Delta the Movie: Absolute Live!!!!!!	October 8, 2021	
7	Star Blazers: Space Battleship Yamato 2205: Zensho -TAKE OFF-	October 8, 2021	Co-production with Staple Entertainment
8	Star Blazers: Space Battleship Yamato 2205: Kosho -STASHA-	February 4, 2022	

=== Games ===
- Heavy Metal Thunder (2005, Cell Animation Production)
- Persona 2: Innocent Sin (2011, Opening Animation Production)
- Devil Summoner: Soul Hackers (2012, Nintendo 3DS Opening Animation Production)
- E.X. Troopers (2013, Promotional Anime)
- Time and Eternity (2012, 2013 animation movies and characters)
- Aquarion Evol (PlayStation VR)
- Daemon X Machina (2019, "Order Zero" prologue animation & in-game opening animation production)

== Related studios ==
- Debris Sapporo - A studio founded by former members.
- GoHands - A studio founded by the staff of Satelight's former Osaka branch.
- Eight Bit - A studio founded by former members.
- Tsumugi Akita Animation Lab - A studio founded by former animator Tsukasa Sakurai after working at Graphinica.
- Studio Kai - A studio founded by ADK Emotions with former staff transferring to the said company.
- Nagomi - A studio founded by former members under Twin Engine group after working at Studio Kai.
