= 3 Seconds Later, He Turned Into a Beast =

Japanese manga series

- cover art of the first manga volume

３秒後､野獣｡～合コンで隅にいた彼は淫らな肉食でした (3-byō Ato, Yajū.: Gōkon de Sumi ni Ita Kare wa Midara na Nikushoku Deshita)
- Genre: Teens' love
- Manga
- Written by: Coa Momose
- Published by: Suiseisha
- English publisher: BookWalker
- Imprint: Clair TL Comics
- Magazine: TL Screamo
- Original run: December 4, 2020 – present
- Volumes: 6
- Anime television series
- Directed by: Ryo Nakamura
- Produced by: Kana Watanabe
- Written by: Date Tsuyama
- Music by: Studio Mausu
- Studio: Staple Entertainment
- Licensed by: Coolmic
- Original network: Tokyo MX, BS11, AT-X
- Original run: April 4, 2022 – June 6, 2022
- Episodes: 8

3 Seconds Later, He Turned Into a Beast (３秒後､野獣｡～合コンで隅にいた彼は淫らな肉食でした, 3-byō Ato, Yajū.: Gōkon de Sumi ni Ita Kare wa Midara na Nikushoku Deshita) is a Japanese manga series by Coa Momose. The series is published by Suiseisha in Japan and distributed by BookWalker online in English. An anime television series by Staple Entertainment was aired from April to June 2022.

== Plot ==
Tsumugi Kume is a college student who was traumatized by an aggressive man in the past. At a mixer where she specifically requested a passive man, she meets Kaname Tōjō, who seems to be just her type. However, Kaname was only pretending to be passive and is actually very aggressive and can change his demeanor in an instant.

== Characters ==
Tsumugi Kume (久米紬, Kume Tsumugi)
Voiced by: Riho Sugiyama (uncensored version), Eikan-Shokora (censored version)
Kaname Tōjō (東条要, Tōjō Kaname)
Voiced by: Shōgo Yano (uncensored version), Kaiōraku (censored version)
Yūto Azusawa (小豆沢悠人, Azusawa Yūto)
Voiced by: Yūya Hirose (uncensored version), Yūma Aoi (censored version)

== Media ==
Written and illustrated by Coa Momose, 3 Seconds Later, He Turned into a Beast was serialized on NTT Solmare's Comic CMoa website under Suiseisha's TL Screamo brand from December 4, 2020, to August 15, 2025. Its chapters were collected in seven tankōbon volumes released from March 18, 2022, to December 18, 2025.

=== Manga ===
No.	Release date	ISBN
1	March 18, 2022	978-4-434-29773-1
2	April 18, 2022	978-4-434-29774-8
3	November 18, 2022	978-4-434-30790-4
4	May 18, 2023	978-4-434-31684-5
5	October 18, 2023	978-4-434-32386-7
6	August 16, 2024	978-4-434-33957-8
7	December 18, 2025	978-4-434-36511-9

=== Anime ===
An anime television series was announced by Suiseisha in October 2021. The series is directed by Ryo Nakamura and is written by Date Tsuyama. Staple Entertainment animated the series, which began airing on April 3, 2022.

No.	Title (Note: The English titles were taken from IMDb.)	Original release date
1	"Is He the One"; Transliteration: "Kare Koso Watashi ga Sagashi Teta Sousho Kukei Danshi!?" (Japanese: 彼こそ私が探してた草食系男子!?)	April 4, 2022
2	"You Wanna Continue?"; Transliteration: "Tsudzuki, Shite Hoshiku Natta?" (Japanese: 続き、して欲しくなった？)	April 11, 2022
3	"Let's Battle"; Transliteration: "Hisabisa ni Batoru Shiyou ya" (Japanese: 久々にバトルしようや)	April 18, 2022
4	"I Wanted LOVE"; Transliteration: "Gara ni mo Naku Ren'ai ga Shitai to o Mottanda" (Japanese: 柄にもなく恋愛がしたいと思ったんだ)	April 25, 2022
5	"I will look out for the bad one" Transliteration: "Ore ga Dameo o Satei Shite Yaru yo" (Japanese: 俺がダメ男を査定してやるよ)	May 9, 2022
6	"Not the brightest but still" Transliteration: "Omae ga Nibui no wa Shitteru Kedo sa" (Japanese: お前が鈍いのは知ってるけどさ)	May 16, 2024
7	"Just choose me!" Transliteration: "Isso Boku Sonomono o Erande Yo" (Japanese: いっそ僕そのものを選んでよ)	May 23, 2024
8	"The one I want to hold and kiss" Transliteration: "Ore ga Dakishimete Kisu Shitai no wa…" (Japanese: 俺が抱きしめてキスしたいのは…)	June 6, 2024
