= Tune In to the Midnight Heart =

Japanese manga series

- First tankōbon volume cover

真夜中ハートチューン (Mayonaka Hāto Chūn)
- Genre: Romantic comedy
- Manga
- Written by: Masakuni Igarashi
- Published by: Kodansha
- English publisher: NA: Kodansha USA
- Imprint: Shōnen Magazine Comics
- Magazine: Weekly Shōnen Magazine
- Original run: September 20, 2023 – present
- Volumes: 15
- Anime television series
- Directed by: Masayuki Takahashi
- Produced by: Takashi Murakami; Yuusaku Azami; Hirokuni Taniguchi; Hirotsugu Oogo; Ayumi Iwasaki; Nobuhiko Kurosu; Fumihiro Ozawa
- Written by: Yukie Sugiwara
- Music by: Kuniyuki Takahashi
- Studio: Gekkou
- Licensed by: Crunchyroll: SEA: Plus Media Networks Asia
- Original network: FNS (Kansai TV, Fuji TV), BS Asahi, AT-X
- Original run: January 6, 2026 – present
- Episodes: 12
- icon

Tune In to the Midnight Heart (Japanese: 真夜中ハートチューン, Hepburn: Mayonaka Hāto Chūn) is a Japanese manga series written and illustrated by Masakuni Igarashi. It began serialization in Kodansha's Weekly Shōnen Magazine in September 2023, and has been compiled into fifteen tankōbon volumes as of November 2026. The series is simultaneously serialized in English on Kodansha's K Manga digital service.

This series follows a young Japanese boy searching for the identity of "Apollo", a girl who used to livestream and gave him solace. After narrowing it down to a specific high school, he transfers there but faces the challenge of identifying Apollo among the broadcasting club's four girls, who have their own dreams and a desire for his financial support.

An anime television series adaptation produced by Gekkou aired from January to March 2026. A second season is set to premiere in 2027.

== Plot ==
Arisu Yamabuki, a high school sophomore, has been looking for a girl named Apollo, a radio broadcaster whose face and real name he does not know. One day, Arisu finds a clue about Apollo in the broadcasting club of the high school he is attending. There, he finds four beautiful girls who dream of "getting a job related to voice." Arisu vows to fulfill the dreams of each of the four girls in order to find out the true identity of Apollo.

== Characters ==
Arisu Yamabuki (山吹 有栖, Yamabuki Arisu)
Voiced by: Rikuya Yasuda (anime) (Japanese); Ricco Fajardo (English)
The protagonist, he is currently a 2nd-year high school student. He listened to a radio personality known only under the alias Apollo while in junior high school and is determined to learn her true identity. He chose his high school as he knew it was merging with a local women's high school and he suspected that Apollo would be a student at the merged school.
Shinobu Uzuki (雨月 しのぶ, Uzuki Shinobu)
Voiced by: Ayane Sakura (PV), Miku Itō (anime) (Japanese); Kayla Temshiv (English)
A high school student and a member of the broadcasting club. She is aiming to become an announcer. She is also the student council vice president. She currently lives with her father following her parents' divorce.
Nene Himekawa (日芽川 寧々, Himekawa Nene)
Voiced by: Ayane Sakura (PV), Rumi Okubo (anime) (Japanese); Tia Ballard (English)
A high school student and a member of the broadcasting club. She is aiming to become a voice actress.
Iko Kirino (霧乃 イコ, Kirino Iko)
Voiced by: Ayane Sakura (PV), Sayumi Suzushiro (anime) (Japanese); Sarah Wiedenheft (English)
A high school student and a member of the broadcasting club. She is aiming to become a VTuber. Her online persona is Ikon Sumeragi (すめらぎ イコン, Sumeragi Ikon).
Rikka Inohana (井ノ華 六花, Inohana Rikka)
Voiced by: Ayane Sakura (PV), Momoko Seto (anime) (Japanese); Abigail Blythe (English)
A high school student and a member of the broadcasting club. She is aiming to become a singer. She often holds public performances while playing the guitar, but had little success until Arisu began helping her.
Lemon Ando (安藤 檸檬, Ando Remon)
Voiced by: Kana Hanazawa (Japanese); Hannah Alyea (English)
A teacher and adviser of the broadcasting club.
Aiko (アイコ)
Voiced by: Yuki Wakai (Japanese); Erin Kelly Noble (English)
Rikka's best friend and former band member.
Ao Momotose (百歳あお, Momotose Ao)
Voiced by: Nao Tōyama (Japanese); Veronica Laux (English)
A famous VTuber who has over 3 million subscribers. She is part of the VTuber group called Blue Box.
Riina Yamabuki (山吹 りいな, Yamabuki Riina)
Voiced by: Ami Koshimizu
Mito Yamabuki (山吹 美兎, Yamabuki Mito)
Voiced by: Kaede Hondo

== Media ==
=== Manga ===
Tune In to the Midnight Heart is written and illustrated by Masakuni Igarashi. It began serialization in Kodansha's Weekly Shōnen Magazine on September 20, 2023. It is also simultaneously released in English on Kodansha's K Manga digital service. During their panel at San Diego Comic-Con 2024, Kodansha USA announced that they licensed the series for English publication beginning in Q2 2025.

The first volume was released on December 15, 2023. To promote the release, an article featuring an interview and collaboration with VTuber Shigure Ui was published, along with comments by voice actress Kana Hanazawa. The second volume was released on February 16, 2024. To promote its release, a video featuring Ayane Sakura voicing the female characters was published.

==== Volumes ====
No.	Original release date	Original ISBN	English release date	English ISBN
1	December 15, 2023	978-4-06-533754-7	May 6, 2025	979-8-888774-91-5
1. Re:Start (RE：START); 2. A Message From Arisu Yamabuki (山吹有栖がお送りしました, Yamabuki Arisu ga Ookuri Shima Shita); 3. Liar (うそつき, Uso-tsuki); 4. Three Weeks Until The Kiss (キスまで3週間, Kisu made Sanshūkan); 5. Overture (オーバーチュア, Ōbāchua)
2	February 16, 2024	978-4-06-534570-2	July 15, 2025	979-8-888774-92-2
6. Lock The Door If It's Embarrassing (恥ずかしいなら鍵をかけろ, Hazukashīnara kagi o kakero); 7. I Can't Smile In Front of the Camera! (カメラの前では笑えない!!, Kamera no maede wa waraenai!!); 8. I Can't Smile In Front of You! (キミの前では笑えない…！, Kimi no maede wa waraenai…!); 9. All Alone With You Until Dark (夜までコースで2人きり, Yoru made kōsu de Futari kiri); 10. Partners in Crime (共犯, Kyōhan); 11. The Adviser's Name is Literally Lemon-chan (顧問の名前はレモンちゃん, Komon no namae wa remon-chan); 12. I Can't Tell Whose Voice It Was (誰の声かわからない, Dare no koe ka wakaranai); 13. Arisu Yamabuki-kun (山吹有栖君です, Yamabuki Arisu Kimi Desu); 14. Flyby Anomaly (フライバイ・アノマリー, Furaibai anomarī)
3	April 17, 2024	978-4-06-535415-5	September 2, 2025	979-8-888774-93-9
15. Nene Saw (寧々は見た, Nene wa mita); 16. Piece of Cake (PIECE OF CAKE(朝飯前さ), Asameshimae sa); 17. This is Very Hot, So Please Be Careful (お熱いのでお気をつけて, O atsuinode okiwotsukete); 18. 20 Points is Still Within the Margin of Error (20点は誤差のうち, Nijūten wa gosa no uchi); 19. Forgetful (忘れっぽいんだ, Wasureppoi nda); 20. Emotion is a Spontaneous Process (感情は衝動, Kanjō wa shōdō); 21. Affection is an Escalating Process (感傷は昇騰, Kanshō wa shōtō); 22. Payback Achieved (リベンジ成功, Ribenji seikō); 23. This is All Your Fault (全部 キミのせいだよ, Zenbu kimi no seida yo)
4	June 17, 2024	978-4-06-535777-4	November 4, 2025	979-8-888774-94-6
24. A Bolt from the Blue (青天の霹靂, Seiten'nohekireki); 25. Direct Contact (直接触れるんだ, Chokusetsu fureru nda); 26. Black Wind, White Rain (黒風白雨, Kokufūhakuu); 27. Kiss or Hug (キスorハグ, Kisu or hagu); 28. While One Wasn't Looking (少し目を離した隙に, Sukoshi me o hanashita suki ni); 29. Secret Track (SECRET TRACK); 30. Celestial (cerestial(天上の), Tenjō no); 31. In Rikka's Front Row (六花の最前列で, Rikka no sai zenretsu de); 32. Defiance (反逆の証, Hangyaku no akashi)
5	September 17, 2024	978-4-06-536773-5	January 13, 2026	979-8-888775-38-7
33. Her Free-Response Answers Are All Nonsense (記述問題はでたらめ, Kijutsu mondai wa detarame); 34. Struck by the Magic of the Night (夜の空気にあてられて, Yoru no kūki ni ate rarete); 35. Crossing the Finish Line Last / Yet Still Overflowing with Love (×ザヨリ・コイア〇(末座より・恋余る), × Zayori Koia O (Matsuza yori koi amaru)); 36. The Amidakuji Willed It (あみだで決まったから, Amida de kimatta kara); 37. Close the Distance With Him (懐に入るんだ, Futokoro ni hairu nda); 38. The Night Grows Late, The Four Grow Restless Over Yamabuki (四方山吹き荒れ夜が更ける, Arisu Yamabuki are yoru ga fukeru); 39. Putting Skin in the Game Just for You (君のために一肌, Kimi no tame ni hito hada); 40. She Either Loves You or Wants to Show Off (あなたが好きか見せたがりのどっちか, Anata ga suki ka miseta gari no dotchi ka); 41. Something Important to Tell You (大切なお話を, Taisetsu na ohanashi o)
6	November 15, 2024	978-4-06-537511-2	March 10, 2026	979-8-888775-65-3
42. The Fireworks Won't Wait (花火は待ってくれない, Hanabi wa matte kurenai); 43. There You Are (見つけた, Mitsuketa); 44. Wafting Fragrance (追い風用意, Oikaze yōi); 45. It's Not True, Though... (事実ではないのだけど…, Jijitsude wa nai nodakedo…); 46. A Watched Pot Never Boils (見つめる鍋は煮立たない, Mitsumeru nabe wa nitatanai); 47. Switching Girls (鞍替え, Kuragae); 48. We Match (おそろだよ, O soroda yo); 49. A Love that Won't Fade Even After 100 Years with Me (百年醒めない恋をしよう, Hyakunen samenai koi o shiyō); 50. Rendezvous With Me? (ランデブーしようか, Randebū shiyou ka)
7	January 17, 2025	978-4-06-538132-8	May 5, 2026	979-8-88-877625-4
51. Summer Loose Ends (夏のやり残し, Natsu no yari nokoshi); 52. A Sign that You Have Something to Hide (隠し事のサイン, Kakushigoto no sain); 53. Where There's a Lip, There's a Way (声唇一倒 (せいしんいっとう), Koe kuchibiru ittō (Seishin ittō)); 54. Always In a Good Mood (隣には大船が, Tonari ni wa ōfune ga); 55. A Yamabuki is Always Nearby (いつも近くに山吹が, Itsumo chikaku ni yamabuki ga); 56. The Girl Who Wants to Cast a Spell (かけたい少女, Kaketai shōjo); 57. Grumpy-Looking Girls (機嫌の悪い少女たち, Kigen no warui shōjo-tachi); 58. I Refuse (嫌, Iya)
8	March 17, 2025	978-4-06-538706-1	July 7, 2026	979-8-88-877656-8
59. I'll Take That as a Compliment (誉め言葉に勘定しておく, Homekotoba ni kanjō shite oku); 60. Huh? (え？, E?); 61. Before You Know It... (うかうかしてると…, Ukauka shi teru to…); 62. Practice for Romance (恋愛の練習, Ren'ai no renshū); 63. There's Nothing for Me to Be Embarrassed About (何も恥ずべきことなどない, Nani mo hazubeki koto nado nai); 64. Doing a 180 (手のひら返し, Te no hira gaeshi); 65. Gravity Assist (スイングバイ, Suingu Bai); 66. Where Their Love Will Go (行方の果て, Yukue no hate)
9	June 17, 2025	978-4-06-539757-2	September 1, 2026	979-8-88-877730-5
67. Never Touched (触れてないんだ, Fure tenai nda); 68. If You Pause for Three Seconds, That's a Blooper (3秒無音は放送事故, Sanbyō muon wa hōsō jiko); 69. As You Like It (お気に召すまま, Oki ni mesu mama); 70. Who? (誰?, Dare?); 71. Pathfinder (パスファインダー, Pasufaindā); 72. This Is What I Don't Really Like About You (そういうところがホントに…, Sōiu tokoro ga honto ni…); 73. Alone With You (二人っきりになりたい, Futari-kkiri ni naritai); 74. Distraction (よそ見のせいだよ, Yosomi no seida yo); 75. One More Time! (もっかい…！, Mokkai…!)
10	September 17, 2025	978-4-06-540709-7	December 22, 2026	979-8-88-877964-4
76. ↑ She Still Went All Out Anyway (↑結局気合い十二分, ￪ Kekkyoku kiai jūnibun); 77. We Won't Have To Worry About How Others See Us (人の目なんか気にならない, Hito no me nanka ki ni naranai); 78. The March Hare (3月のウサギ, 3 Tsuki no usagi); 79. Don't Forget This (忘れないでくれ, Wasurenaide kure); 80. Mooning Around with the Moon in the Background (月夜に背中炙る, Tsukiyo ni senaka aburu); 81. Ikon Sumeragi – It's All Your Fault (キミのせい / すめらぎイコン, Kimi no sei/sumeragi ikon); 82. Give Me a Buzz (Give me a buzz(連絡待ってます), Gibu me a buzz (renraku mattemasu)); 83. Money for Our Ice Cream (ご褒美のアイス代, Go hōbi no aisu-dai); 84. I Hate You (大嫌い, Daikirai)
11	December 17, 2025	978-4-06-541945-8	—	—
85. Girls Tugging at Each Other's Sleeves (袖を引き合う少女達, Sode o hikiau shōjo-tachi); 86. I Love You (愛してる, Aishiteru); 87. Goodbye, Alone Time (二人っきりはこれっきり, Futari-kkiri wa Korekkiri); 88. Bardners in Grime (ひょーはん, Hiyohan); 89. I Can't Tell You (教えない, Oshienai); 90. She's Dyed in Red (真っ赤に染まる, Makka ni Somaru); 91. Arisu Yamabuki's First Defeat (山吹有栖の一敗目, Yamabuki Arisu no Ippai-me); 92. See, I Told You so. Your wish Came true, Didn't It? (ホラ、叶ったでしょ？, Hora, Kanatta Desho?); 93. Say It Again (…もう一度言ってくれ, …Mōichido itte Kure)
12	March 17, 2026	978-4-06-543005-7	—	—
94. "Ask for the Moon"; 95. This isn't a Superhero Movie, After All (ヒーロー映画じゃあるまいし, Hīrō Eiga Jaarumaishi); 96. Out of Pattern (柄にもない, Gara ni mo nai); 97. Scooping Up Stars (星を掬う, Hoshi o Sukuu); 98. No Longer Need Any Cough Drops (のど飴はいらない, Nodo ame wa Iranai); 99. My Teeth Might Just Get Cavities (虫歯になりそう, Mushiba ni Nari-sō); 100. The President's Orders Are Absolute (部長命令は絶対, Buchō Meirei wa Zettai); 101. Cosmic Latte (コズミック・ラテ, Kozumikku Rate); 102. I Don't Have Them (持ってない, Mottenai)
13	May 15, 2026	978-4-06-543606-6	—	—
103. You Came Up Short (詰めが甘い, Tsumegaamai); 104. Gravitational Lens (重力レンズ, Jūryoku Renzu); 105. Lagrange Points (ラグランジュポイント, Raguranju Pointo); 106. She's Definitely Mad at Me! (コレ絶対怒ってるやつ…！, Kore Zettai Okotteru Yatsu…!); 107. Just Like the Comet (彗星のように, Suisei no Yō ni); 108. I Was Way Too Relaxed! (肩の力抜きすぎ！, Kata no Chikara Nuki Sugi!); 109. Blueshift (ブルーシフト, Burūshifuto); 110. Orbital Resonance (軌道共鳴(オービタルレゾナンス), Ōbitaru Rezonansu); 111. A Handful (手がかかる, Tegakakaru)
14	August 17, 2026	978-4-06-544611-9	—	—
112. You Might Not Actually Hate This After All (意外と嫌いじゃなかったり, Igaito Kirai Janakattari); 113. The Countdown to Christmas (クリスマスまで あと…, Kurisumasu Made Ato…); 114. What Went on Behind His Back (目を盗む, Me o Nusumu); 115. Boxing Day (BOXINGDAY(閉じ込められる日), Tojikome Rareru hi); 116. Looking at the Same Moon (同じ月を見ていた, Onaji Tsuki o Mite ita); 117. Foreboding Weather (雲行きが怪しい, Kumoyuki ga Ayashī); 118. Boxing Day/Offering Day (BOXINGDAY(贈り物の日), Okurimono no Hi); 119. He's Dyed in Sweat (掻いて染まる, Kaite Somaru); 120. There Is a Tide in the Affairs of Men
15	November 17, 2026	978-4-06-545729-0	—	—
121. Bye-Bye, Nene (バイバイ寧々, Bai Bai Nene); 122. No Clipping Allowed (切り抜き禁止, Kirinuki Kinshi); 123. Sinking Nene (浮かない寧々, Ukanai Nene); 124. Turn to a Yamabuki for Help First Before Praying to Gods (神の前に山吹頼み, Kami no Mae ni Yamabuki Tanomi); 125. I'm Not Hearing Anything (聞こえない, Kikoenai); 126. Optical Double Stars (見かけの二重星, Mikake no Nijūsei); 127. Pale Blue Dot (ペイル・ブルー・ドット, Peiru Burū Dotto); 128. The Culminating Conclusion (収束する終息, Shūsoku Suru Shūsoku); 129. Trapezium Chocolate 1 (トラペジウム・ショコラ 1, Torapejiumu Shokora 1)

==== Chapters not yet in tankōbon format ====
130. Trapezium Chocolate 2 (トラペジウム・ショコラ 2, Torapejiumu Shokora 2)
131. Trapezium Chocolate 3 (トラペジウム・ショコラ 3, Torapejiumu Shokora 3)
132. I Won't (はなさない, Hanasanai)
133. Use Any Means Necessary (手段は選んでられない, Shudan wa Eranderarenai)
134. Pay You Back (かりを返す, Kari o Kaesu)
135. Asterism (アステリズム, Asuterizumu)
136. Light and Dark Blend (混ざる明暗, Mazaru Meian)
137. Asterism (Star Pattern) (星群（アステリズム）, Hoshimura (Asuterizumu))

=== Anime ===
An anime television series adaptation was announced on March 14, 2025. It is produced by Gekkou and directed by Masayuki Takahashi, with series composition by Yukie Sugawara, characters designed by Tomoyuki Shitaya, and music composed by Kuniyuki Takahashi. The series aired from January 6 to March 24, 2026, on the brand new Ka-Anival!! programming block on all FNS affiliates, including Kansai TV and Fuji TV. The opening theme song is "Tsuki ni Mukatte Ute" (月に向かって撃て; 'Attack Toward the Moon'), performed by Hoshimachi Suisei, while the ending theme song is "Koe no Kiseki" (声の軌跡; 'Trails of Voices'), performed by Soala. Crunchyroll is streaming the series. Plus Media Networks Asia licensed the series in Southeast Asia and broadcasts it on Aniplus Asia.

After the airing of the final episode, a second season was announced. It is set to premiere in 2027.

==== Episodes ====
No.	Title	Directed by (Note: Production staff information is taken from the ending credits of each episode.)	Storyboarded by	Original release date
1	"This Has Been Yamabuki Arisu"; Transliteration: "Yamabuki Arisu ga Ōkuri Shimashita" (Japanese: 山吹有栖がお送りしました)	Masayuki Takahashi	Masayuki Takahashi	January 6, 2026
1	"RE:START"	Masayuki Takahashi	Masayuki Takahashi	January 6, 2026
After enrolling in Furin High School, Arisu Yamabuki aims to find the mysterious girl behind the voice of a radio personality known as "Apollo". Back in middle school, they would talk in her show "Midnight Heart Tune", but she erased her online presence before high school, disappearing without a trace. Hearing a voice resembling Apollo's, Arisu barges into the broadcast club room, only to discover four girls aspiring to use their voices professionally: announcer Shinobu Uzuki, VTuber Iko Kirino, voice actress Nene Himekawa, and singer Rikka Inohana. Arisu joins the club to narrow his search, observing them for similarities to Apollo. Disappointed at their lack of professionalism, Arisu boldly proclaims that he will help them achieve their dreams, prompting them to kick him out of the room. Arisu is then shocked when Apollo returns online, explaining she cannot reveal herself yet, with her voice coming from inside the room.
2	"Liar"; Transliteration: "Usotsuki" (Japanese: うそつき)	Yūma Kano	Masayuki Takahashi	January 13, 2026 (Note: This episode aired at 11:15 p.m. JST, 15 minutes after the regular air time on FNS.)
2	"Himekawa Nene's Ears Give It Away"; Transliteration: "Himekawa Nene wa Mimi ni Deru" (Japanese: 日芽川寧々は耳に出る)	Yūma Kano	Masayuki Takahashi	January 13, 2026
Emboldened by Apollo's reappearance, Arisu vows to find her within the club. Arisu creates detailed training plans to improve the girls' voices. Rikka chides him for assuming she has lackluster skills as a singer, so Arisu later observes her performance at school. Arisu is left stunned at Rikka's proficiency in music as Rikka remains skeptical of his plans. After seeing Arisu humble himself and correct his mistakes, Rikka makes amends. Sometime later, Arisu notices that Nene is avoidant of his plans, so he follows her. He learns that Nene secretly practices her voice acting with a romance manga called Knightly Love. Nene admits she has difficulty acting out the manga in preparation for its voice audition, prompting Arisu to assist her by acting as her boyfriend publicly and reenacting the manga's scenes, much to Nene's embarrassment. Despite failing the audition, Nene realizes her acting has improved with Arisu's help. Nene sneaks a kiss on Arisu as thanks, but she becomes flustered when Arisu catches on.
3	"Lock the Door If It's Embarrassing"; Transliteration: "Hazukashīnara Kagi o Kakero" (Japanese: 恥ずかしいなら鍵をかけろ)	Yoshihiro Sasaki	Masayuki Takahashi	January 20, 2026
3	"I Can't Smile In Front of the Camera"; Transliteration: "Kamera no Maede wa Waraenai!!" (Japanese: カメラの前では笑えない！！)	Yoshihiro Sasaki	Masayuki Takahashi	January 20, 2026
3	"I Can't Smile In Front of You"; Transliteration: "Kimi no Maede wa Waraenai...!" (Japanese: 君の前では笑えない…！)	Yoshihiro Sasaki	Masayuki Takahashi	January 20, 2026
The girls wonder how Arisu spends his time outside of club activities, so they tail him and learn he is earnestly taking part-time jobs to support them. Seeing this, Iko personally meets with Arisu to disclose her concerns of her stagnating VTuber career. Arisu points out how her VTuber model does not fully capture her emotions, so he works with Iko to overhaul it and allow Iko to genuinely express herself. Arisu and Iko unveil her overhauled VTuber model in a livestream, but Iko grows tense and reverts to her withdrawn nature. Arisu senses Iko's nervousness and he helps by establishing rapport with her that incites joy and anger from Iko, and her genuine character is positively received by her fans. Iko thanks Arisu through her VTuber model, though she struggles in expressing a smile to Arisu without becoming flushed with embarrassment.
4	"All Alone with You until Dark"; Transliteration: "Yoru Made Kōsu de Futari kiri" (Japanese: 夜までコースで2人きり)	Tomio Yamauchi, Kentaro Iino & Taichi Atarashi	Masayuki Takahashi	January 27, 2026
4	"Partners in Crime"; Transliteration: "Kyōhan" (Japanese: 共犯)	Tomio Yamauchi, Kentaro Iino & Taichi Atarashi	Masayuki Takahashi	January 27, 2026
4	"The Adviser's Called Lemon-chan"; Transliteration: "Komon no Namae wa Remon-chan" (Japanese: 顧問の名前はレモンちゃん)	Tomio Yamauchi, Kentaro Iino & Taichi Atarashi	Masayuki Takahashi	January 27, 2026
Shinobu becomes burdened with her obligations as student council vice president alongside her club duties, which she explains is part of wanting to be respected by her peers. Arisu tells her to loosen up and rely on others, prompting Shinobu to ask him for assistance. Shinobu also opens up to Arisu on her inferiority complex within the club and reveals her intention to leave to focus on her studies. Arisu refuses to give up on her and continues to lend a helping hand for Shinobu to grow, inspiring the latter to take the initiative in planning the club's event for the school's sports festival, which involves students anonymously relaying their confessions using a string phone to be announced by the club. The club members take turns participating and commentating on the festival's games and grow excited with Shinobu's plan, when the club's advisor Lemon Ando intervenes.
5	"I Can't Tell Whose Voice It Was"; Transliteration: "Dare no Koe ka Wakaranai" (Japanese: 誰の声かわからない)	Kentaro Iino	Masayuki Takahashi	February 3, 2026
5	"Yamabuki Arisu-kun"; Transliteration: "Yamabuki Arisu-kun Desu" (Japanese: 山吹有栖君です)	Kentaro Iino	Masayuki Takahashi	February 3, 2026
5	"Flyby Anomaly"; Transliteration: "Furaibai Anomari" (Japanese: フライバイ・アノマリー)	Kentaro Iino	Masayuki Takahashi	February 3, 2026
Lemon initially shoots down the club's plan, citing it is too much effort. After Shinobu highlights how the plan can raise her status as a teacher, Lemon helps the club by distracting Samejima, the teacher prohibiting romantic advances between students. The club uses the opportunity to promote their event, with the girls dressing up in cosplay to garner more attention. The club sets their plan in motion with Shinobu broadcasting the confessions. The event becomes a success as Iko asks Nene and Rikka if they have something to confess. Nene, Rikka, and Iko all confide they want to make up to Arisu for underestimating him without implying it is about Arisu. Shinobu encounters technical difficulties, so Arisu provides her a megaphone to continue the event. Shinobu hugs Arisu as thanks, and she relays a confession from a girl expressing regret for betraying a boy who had long supported her. Arisu hears this and realizes its similarities with Apollo, which is confirmed when Shinobu relays the benefactor's declaration of love. Apollo later anonymously talks with Arisu through the string phone, who invites him to come inside the broadcast room to see her.
6	"Nene Saw"; Transliteration: "Nene wa Mita" (Japanese: 寧々は見た)	Tsurumi Mukoyama	Masayuki Takahashi	February 10, 2026 (Note: This episode aired at 11:10 p.m. JST, 10 minutes after the regular air time on FNS.)
6	"A Piece of Cake"; Transliteration: "Asameshimae sa" (Japanese: A Piece of Cake(朝飯前さ))	Tsurumi Mukoyama	Masayuki Takahashi	February 10, 2026
6	"I'll Cherish What You Just Said Forever"; Transliteration: "Ima no Kotoba, Zutto Taisetsu ni Suru ne" (Japanese: 今の言葉、ずっと大切にするね)	Tsurumi Mukoyama	Masayuki Takahashi	February 10, 2026
The broadcast club celebrates the event's success at Lemon's apartment. As the girls leave a tired Arisu to sleep and head out, Iko lies down beside him and jealously asks on his closeness to Shinobu. Nene misinterprets Iko's actions as her kissing Arisu, as they awkwardly discuss how they feel about Arisu. The two hide from Shinobu and hear her apologizing for the hug; when Rikka arrives, Shinobu also hides with them and listen to Rikka's uncertainty towards composing a new song. Rikka catches on to the other girls and creates a tense atmosphere, just as Arisu wakes up to find all the girls having bought cake to celebrate. The club then plays party games to pass the time, while Arisu continues figuring out Apollo's identity. Arisu recalls on refusing Apollo's invitation and becoming inspired to pursue voice producer work upon seeing the girls' aspirations. As the club agrees on Shinobu's plan being fun, Arisu recalls that Apollo whispered something to him before hiding again.
7	"It's Hot, So Please Be Careful"; Transliteration: "O Atsuinode oki o Tsukete" (Japanese: お熱いのでお気をつけて)	Seiichi Hirano	Masayuki Takahashi	February 17, 2026
7	"20 Points Is Basically Margin of Error"; Transliteration: "Nijūten wa Gosa no Uchi" (Japanese: 20点は誤差のうち)	Seiichi Hirano	Masayuki Takahashi	February 17, 2026
7	"Forgetful"; Transliteration: "Wasureppoi nda" (Japanese: 忘れっぽいんだ)	Seiichi Hirano	Masayuki Takahashi	February 17, 2026
While watching Rikka's performance, Arisu approaches Rikka's former friend Aiko, who voices her displeasure of Rikka only covering popular songs and not showcasing her original songs. Although Arisu initially believes Rikka performs them out of obligation, Rikka proves she is able to sing a popular song passionately. Rikka then reveals she is hesitant to perform her original songs out of fear of being negatively judged. Resonating with her struggles, Arisu arranges a private concert with the broadcast club for Rikka to perform and build her confidence. Rikka is able to showcase her talents confidently to the club, much to Arisu's satisfaction. Arisu sees how the girls can guide each other to their dreams without his inputs, so he invites them to the mall to strengthen their friendships. Arisu assists the girls, during which he notices several traits that connect either of them to Apollo. When the girls sing a song that Apollo formerly liked at the club's karaoke session, Arisu demands to know who shared it to them, though the girls express having no knowledge on the benefactor.
8	"Feelings Are Impulsive"; Transliteration: "Kanjō wa Shōdō" (Japanese: 感情は衝動)	Kinya Nakamura	Mitsuko Ohya	February 24, 2026
8	"Feelings Can Escalate"; Transliteration: "Kanshō wa Shōtō" (Japanese: 感傷は昇騰)	Kinya Nakamura	Mitsuko Ohya	February 24, 2026
8	"Payback Achieved"; Transliteration: "Ribenji Seikō" (Japanese: リベンジ成功)	Kinya Nakamura	Mitsuko Ohya	February 24, 2026
The broadcast club asks Arisu to help out Nene, who has agreed to become an actor for the theater club to improve her skills despite its distinct style to voice acting. Arisu notices that Nene is scolded by the lead actor due to thinking first before acting, so he advises her to immerse herself with a given scenario. Arisu and Iko act as a couple, with Arisu cheating on Nene, to bring out Nene's genuine emotions during acting. Although Nene initially has difficulty visualizing the scenario, she becomes stunned upon seeing Arisu and Iko interact romantically. The ploy, which is revealed to be planned by Rikka and Shinobu, escalates when Iko improvises a desire to kiss Arisu, forcing a flustered Nene to intervene. Nene reflects on the event to improvise her acting at the next practice session, impressing the lead actor. Nene then thanks Arisu for his assistance and implies she would have committed to kissing Arisu in Iko's place, before brushing it off as part of her acting.
9	"It's All Your Fault"; Transliteration: "Zenbu Kimi no Seidayo" (Japanese: 全部 キミのせいだよ)	Masayuki Takahashi, Kentaro Iino & Shinji Sano	Mitsuko Ohya	March 3, 2026
9	"I'll Show You Someday"; Transliteration: "Itsuka Miseteageru" (Japanese: いつか見せてあげる)	Masayuki Takahashi, Kentaro Iino & Shinji Sano	Mitsuko Ohya	March 3, 2026
9	"A Bolt from the Blue"; Transliteration: "Seiten'nohekireki" (Japanese: 青天の霹靂)	Masayuki Takahashi, Kentaro Iino & Shinji Sano	Mitsuko Ohya	March 3, 2026
9	"We'll Make Direct Contact"; Transliteration: "Chokusetsu Fureru nda" (Japanese: 直接触れるんだ)	Masayuki Takahashi, Kentaro Iino & Shinji Sano	Mitsuko Ohya	March 3, 2026
Iko fears her clubmates will achieve their dreams before her, so she aspires for her VTuber career to grow in popularity. Iko dabbles in several types of livestreams to mirror the content of trending VTuber Ao Momotose, though her inexperience is displayed. Arisu suggests she join a horror game speedrunning challenge, only to learn on the day of the challenge that Iko greatly dislikes horror. Despite this, her frightened outbursts catch Ao's attention, who invites Iko to a kart racing game competition. Arisu urges Iko to join, but she loses after being matched against rude participants by Ao, much to Arisu's dismay. Iko expresses satisfaction on being able to join a large event even if she lost, as Ao calls her to apologize on poorly treating her and wishes to meet her again with Arisu, surprising them both. Iko then feigns a kiss on Arisu as a sign of gratitude, catching Arisu off-guard.
10	"Kiss or Hug... or even something more??" Transliteration: "Kisu or Hagu" (Japanese: キスor ハグ)	Yūma Kano	Masayuki Takahashi	March 10, 2026
10	"Black Cats and White Dogs"; Transliteration: "Kokufūhakuu" (Japanese: 黒風白雨)	Yūma Kano	Masayuki Takahashi	March 10, 2026
As the broadcast club conducts their activities by reading anonymous messages related to love, Nene and Rikka argue on whether a kiss or hug would effectively advance a relationship. Arisu arrives to inform them that their quarrel is being broadcast, and Lemon advises them to not talk about romance publicly. Shinobu then notices Arisu's closeness with the other girls by referring them to their first names. After conducting a study session with Arisu, Shinobu internally admits she feels inadequate even with Arisu's help due to her dreams being vastly different from the rest of the club. Shinobu also points out how Arisu's efforts to assist them also helped Iko, Nene, and Rikka to grow closer to him, and she selfishly wishes to spend more time with Arisu than pursue her dreams. Shinobu requests to Arisu that he can call her by her first name when she is able to make substantial progress on her dreams.
11	"While You Look Away"; Transliteration: "Sukoshi me o Hanashita Suki ni" (Japanese: 少し目を離した隙に)	Kentaro Iino	Masayuki Takahashi	March 17, 2026
11	"SECRET TRACK"	Kentaro Iino	Masayuki Takahashi	March 17, 2026
11	"celestial"	Kentaro Iino	Masayuki Takahashi	March 17, 2026
While hanging out with the broadcast club, Rikka finds Aiko holding a street performance with their original song, causing Rikka to recall running away from her shared dream with Aiko. Rikka decides to follow her dream and perform the song at school. Inspired by her drive, Arisu schedules Rikka's street performance to sell her CD. Rikka insists on handling the street performance by herself, while also sharing her struggle to write her last song for the set. Arisu hears that Rikka's last song is dedicated to someone, so he agrees to talk with her to learn about its subject. Arisu deduces the subject is Aiko, and he suggests to Rikka on expressing what she likes about them through lyrics. Warmed by Arisu's feedback, Rikka holds off on performing her last song, much to Arisu's confusion. Afterwards, they survey the area for the street performance. Rikka worries she will be looked down by people, though Arisu assures he will support her. Rikka sullenly accepts no one will come to watch her, until she finds her clubmates sneaking in at Arisu's behest. Rikka becomes motivated to perform a song dedicated to them, and an audience begins to form.
12	"In Rikka's Front Row"; Transliteration: "Rikka no Sai Zenretsu de" (Japanese: 六花の最前列で)	Masayuki Takahashi	Masayuki Takahashi	March 24, 2026
12	"Symbol of Defiance"; Transliteration: "Hangyaku no akashi" (Japanese: 反逆の証)	Masayuki Takahashi	Masayuki Takahashi	March 24, 2026
Rikka's confidence is bolstered after the audience buys her CD. However, her set is rudely interrupted by an impromptu performance from the band Celestial, causing Rikka's audience to watch them instead. Rikka becomes demoralized as she attempts to continue her set. She guiltily recalls how Aiko supported their dream in spite of the record label they were being scouted for only looking for Rikka's talent, just as Aiko arrives to watch. Aiko requests her to continue singing, prompting Rikka to perform the song dedicated to Aiko and allowing the two to reconcile. After celebrating with the broadcast club, Arisu and Rikka split off from the group. Arisu congratulates her, but Rikka voices her dismay of the audience abandoning her with Celestial's arrival and questions whether she picked the right path for her music career. Arisu apologizes on his lack of foresight, and Rikka hugs him to show her gratitude. As this is happening, a talent scout expresses interest towards Rikka upon hearing her performance.

== Reception ==
The series ranked 14th in the print category at the tenth Next Manga Awards in 2024.

== See also ==
- Detectives These Days Are Crazy!, another manga series by the same author
- Senryu Girl, another manga series by the same author
- Flower and Asura, another manga series which follows a similar premise
