= Detectives These Days Are Crazy! =

Japanese manga series

- First tankōbon volume cover, Mashiro Nakanishi (back) and Keiichiro Nagumo (front)

まったく最近の探偵ときたら (Mattaku Saikin no Tantei Tokitara)
- Genre: Comedy, mystery
- Manga
- Written by: Masakuni Igarashi
- Published by: ASCII Media Works
- English publisher: NA: One Peace Books
- Imprint: Dengeki Comics NEXT
- Magazine: Dengeki Maoh
- Original run: April 27, 2016 – present
- Volumes: 16
- Anime television series
- Directed by: Rion Kujo
- Written by: Rintarō Ikeda
- Music by: Tomoki Kikuya
- Studio: Liden Films
- Licensed by: Crunchyroll; SEA: Medialink
- Original network: AT-X, Tokyo MX, BS11, SUN, KBS Kyoto
- Original run: July 1, 2025 – September 16, 2025
- Episodes: 12
- icon

Detectives These Days Are Crazy! (Japanese: まったく最近の探偵ときたら, Hepburn: Mattaku Saikin no Tantei Tokitara; lit. 'Detectives These Days, Really') is a Japanese manga series written and illustrated by Masakuni Igarashi. It began serialization in ASCII Media Works' seinen manga magazine Dengeki Maoh in April 2016. An anime television series adaptation produced by Liden Films aired from July to September 2025.

== Plot ==
About 20 years ago, Keiichiro Nagumo was an ace detective in Japan despite being in high school. No case was too tough for him to solve. However, at 35 years old, his age is catching up with him. Nagumo no longer has the youthful energy or fame from his high school days. Suffering from aching hips and back issues, on top of growing increasingly jaded, his private eye office is struggling to attract clients and making it hard to afford rent and food. One day, an excitable high school girl named Mashiro Nakanishi appears at his doorstep and wants to be his apprentice, which he initially refuses. After she helps him finish a case, Nagumo lets her stay as an unpaid apprentice. Mashiro repays him by helping him deal with a wide range of cases from finding lost pets and exterminating bugs to hunting down masked villains and violent gangsters.

== Characters ==
Keiichiro Nagumo (名雲 桂一郎, Nagumo Keiichirō)
Voiced by: Junichi Suwabe (voice comic, anime)
A former genius detective as a high school boy, but now a washed up 35-year-old man running a failing private detective agency who struggles with modern technology and cultural references. Even so, he indirectly inspired a newer generation of detectives and assistants with his former exploits.
Mashiro Nakanishi (中西 真白, Nakanishi Mashiro)
Voiced by: Kana Hanazawa (voice comic, anime)
A bubbly and excitable high school girl who looks up to Nagumo, often uses brute force to complete any task she is given. She can somehow procure any equipment in an instant, from a self-inflating stunt mat to a loaded flamethrower, hidden in her student uniform.
Cerberus (ケルベロス, Keruberosu)
Voiced by: Chado Horii (voice comic, anime)
A stray cat that was captured by Nagumo for a client, only to find out the cat was not the same as the client's. Due to the client's refusal to take it with her, Mashiro decided to keep the cat in the office and named it Cerberus.
Taro Nezu (根津 太郎, Nezu Tarō)
Voiced by: Kengo Kawanishi (voice comic, anime)
A low-level Yakuza who quits his job after Mashiro torches his group's office with a flamethrower. He soon joins the Nagumo Detective Agency, running errands for them.
Yuu Asunaro (翌檜 ユウ, Asunaro Yū)
Voiced by: Tomohiro Yamaguchi (anime)
Another fan of Nagumo's younger days who wants to become his apprentice, even though he has his own detective work and adoring female fanbase. Unlike Nagumo, he wears more traditional Japanese clothing. A master of lockpicking and other security tasks that require finesse, he immediately becomes Mashiro's biggest rival.
Hana Kazamaki (風巻 ハナ, Kazamaki Hana)
Voiced by: Aya Hirano (anime)
Asunaro's assistant who seems to just tolerate his antics and his nickname for her of "Maki-chan". She was given the job after not being intimidated like the rest of his fangirls when Asunaro deliberately made himself appear ugly during an audition to be his assistant. Even so, Maki-chan has an inferiority complex about her size and real age.
Azuha Hoshino (星野アズハ, Hoshino Azuha)
Voiced by: Fairouz Ai (anime)
College dropout and self-proclaimed Star Agent who invents several spy gadgets and custom drugs. Her office is on the floor below that of the Nagumo Detective Agency.
Fuu-chan (風ちゃん, Fū-chan)
Voiced by: Misaki Watada (anime)
The daughter of Detective Mimasaka who was inspired by her father's stories on the job, and now dreams of becoming "Phantom Thief Beaver," constantly stealing little items from Nagumo's office to prove her skills and annoying Mashiro with comments about her appearance.
Soya Mimasaka (美馬坂総也, Mimasaka Sōya)
Voiced by: Yasuyuki Kase (anime)
Nagumo's former classmate. Similar to Nagumo, he was a detective in his high school days who turned 35 years old, and struggles with modern-day technology. Unlike Nagumo, he joined the TMPD after graduation, and now works as a civil servant instead of a private eye. He claims to know Mashiro's "real identity" and the reason behind Nagumo's downfall from fame.
Coach (コーチ, Kōchi)
Voiced by: Hajime Iijima (anime)
A large black man whose real name is unknown, but is often featured in Mashiro's flashbacks as having trained her to fight.

== Media ==
=== Manga ===
Written and illustrated by Masakuni Igarashi, Detectives These Days Are Crazy! began serialization in ASCII Media Works' seinen manga magazine Dengeki Maoh on April 27, 2016. Its chapters have been compiled into sixteen tankōbon volumes as of September 2025. The series is licensed by One Peace Books for English publication.

No.	Original release date	Original ISBN	English release date	English ISBN
1	July 27, 2016	978-4-04-892253-1	April 28, 2025	978-1-64-273463-8
2	February 27, 2017	978-4-04-892682-9	August 28, 2025	978-1-64-273485-0
3	September 27, 2017	978-4-04-893366-7	February 24, 2026	978-1-64-273486-7
4	March 27, 2018	978-4-04-893710-8	—	—
5	February 27, 2019	978-4-04-912362-3	—	—
6	January 27, 2020	978-4-04-912983-0	—	—
7	August 26, 2020	978-4-04-913356-1	—	—
8	November 27, 2020	978-4-04-913596-1	—	—
9	April 26, 2021	978-4-04-913804-7	—	—
10	September 27, 2021	978-4-04-913920-4	—	—
11	January 27, 2022	978-4-04-914193-1	—	—
12	July 27, 2022	978-4-04-914487-1	—	—
13	December 26, 2022	978-4-04-914787-2	—	—
14	July 27, 2023	978-4-04-915021-6	—	—
15	August 27, 2024	978-4-04-915429-0	—	—
16	September 27, 2025	978-4-04-916639-2	—	—

=== Anime ===
An anime television series adaptation was announced on August 23, 2024. It was produced by Liden Films and directed by Rion Kujo, with Rintarō Ikeda overseeing series scripts, Isoroku Koga designing the characters and serving as chief animation director, and Tomoki Kikuya composing the music. The series airied from July 1 to September 16, 2025, on AT-X and other networks. The opening theme song is "Suffer", performed by Taiiku Okazaki, while the ending theme song is "GORI☆GORI Feez e-Girl!!", performed by Kana Hanazawa (as Mashiro) and Tomokazu Sugita (as "Jolly Old Men"). Crunchyroll is streaming the series. Medialink licensed the series in Southeast Asia and Oceania (except Australia and New Zealand) for streaming on Ani-One Asia's YouTube channel.

==== Episodes ====
No.	Title	Directed by	Written by	Storyboarded by	Original release date
1	"Former Great Detective Nagumo Keiichiro"; Transliteration: "Moto Meitantei Nagumo Keiichirō" (Japanese: 元名探偵 名雲桂一郎)	Rion Kujō	Rintarō Ikeda	Rion Kujō	July 1, 2025
1	"Mashiro's Pest Extermination"; Transliteration: "Mashiro no Gaichū Taiji" (Japanese: 真白の害虫退治)	Rion Kujō	Rintarō Ikeda	Rion Kujō	July 1, 2025
Private Detective Keiichiro Nagumo tries to track down a suspected cheating wife when his back flares in pain. Before he can make it out the door, a hyperactive high school girl shows up unannounced and requests to be his assistant. He refuses and follows his target to a nearby café. When the same girl shows up again, she helps him complete the job by pretending to be his "age gap" girlfriend despite his loud protestations. After getting photographic proof of the cheating wife for the client, Nagumo reluctantly lets the girl stay on as an unpaid apprentice, and she reveals her name as Mashiro. After taking on a stray cat as their unofficial mascot, Nagumo tasks Mashiro with another client's request to exterminate a bees' nest. However, a lack of clarity on the address leads Mashiro to the office of a yakuza group, but she proceeds to destroy it anyway. In the process, she scares a low-level member named Nezu to quit before she kills him, and Nezu repays her by joining Nagumo's office.
2	"With Ghosts, Go for the Knees"; Transliteration: "Obake wa Hiza o Nerae" (Japanese: オバケは膝を狙え)	Isoroku Koga	Rintarō Ikeda	Isoroku Koga	July 8, 2025
2	"Find the Real Thief!"; Transliteration: "Shin-han'nin o Sagase!!" (Japanese: 真犯人を探せ!!)	Isoroku Koga	Rintarō Ikeda	Isoroku Koga	July 8, 2025
2	"Three Minutes Until Mashiro Explodes"; Transliteration: "Mashiro Bakuhatsu San-pun-mae" (Japanese: 真白爆発3分前)	Isoroku Koga	Rintarō Ikeda	Isoroku Koga	July 8, 2025
Mashiro's classmate Hayashida visits the office with a request to investigate a spooky ghost that appears near his home. Mashiro has phasmophobia, but Nagumo convinces her to investigate with him anyway. After a week, Nagumo realizes that Hayashida has a crush on Mashiro, and recorded himself disguised as a ghost to replay the clip each time Mashiro came over because he wanted an excuse to talk to her. Following Hayashida's confession, Mashiro returns with a real captured ghost. Nagumo is held by the Tokyo MPD under suspicion of being an underwear thief, where his former classmate, Soya Mimasaka, is the one interrogating him. However, the person caught on camera stealing underwear looks a lot like Nagumo, so Mimasaka refuses to release him until Mashiro and Nezu set a trap to catch the real thief and bring him to the station. A captured suspect called "Knit Man" reveals he planted a bomb in a nearby parking garage. Mashiro attempts to disarm the bomb, but runs low on time after taking multiple selfies next to it. In the end, she opts to kick it inside an abandoned baseball park. Unbeknownst to Mashiro, Nezu is there taking pictures when the bomb explodes.
3	"Great Detective Asunaro"; Transliteration: "Meitantei Asunaro" (Japanese: 名探偵アスナロ)	Kōji Aritomi	Rintarō Ikeda	Katsuyuki Kodera	July 15, 2025
3	"The Ones Who Don't Realize They're Stalkers are the Most Dangerous"; Transliteration: "Sutōkā no Jikaku ga nai Yatsu ga Ichi-ban Yabai" (Japanese: ストーカの自覚がない奴が一番ヤバい)	Kōji Aritomi	Rintarō Ikeda	Katsuyuki Kodera	July 15, 2025
Nagumo laments the fact that he has no money to pay for his office's rent when Yuu Asunaro, himself a young private detective inspired by Nagumo's former exploits, breaks into his office and offers to be his unpaid apprentice. However, Mashiro immediately gets jealous and challenges him to a duel. Asunaro's own assistant, Hana "Maki-chan" Kazamaki, acts as referee. While the two rush off to complete a tiebreaker, Nagumo tells Maki-chan that he has no intention of firing Mashiro and that he happy that he serves as Asunaro's inspiration. Mashiro then manages to win the race by unleashing numerous objects buried somewhere within her sailor uniform and making herself lighter. Asunaro shows up at Nagumo's office again, but this time with a case: to find out whoever is stalking him. After Asunaro goes through clumps of his adoring female fans, Nagumo spots a man in a hoodie stalking him from farther out. After Maki-chan manages to restrain him, the group uncovers that Nezu is the stalker. However, he claims that he was actually spying on the "real" stalker, Asunaro. When Asunaro confesses to watching Nagumo's office over the past month, he escapes from Maki-chan's wrath.
4	"Murder at the Mansion of Screams"; Transliteration: "Zekkyō-kan Satsujin Jiken" (Japanese: 絶叫館殺人事件)	Yū Harima	Yūho Togashi	Yū Harima	July 22, 2025
4	"Maki-chan and the Generation Gap"; Transliteration: "Maki-chan to Jenerēshon Gyappu" (Japanese: マキちゃんとジェネレーションギャップ)	Yū Harima	Rintarō Ikeda, Yūho Togashi	Yū Harima	July 22, 2025
Nagumo and Mashiro are invited to a dinner party at a place called the "Mansion of Screams" where the wealthy Nagasaki family was supposedly massacred 15 years ago. As the guests gather inside, Mashiro and Asunaro both assume a mystery is about to unfold. When Mashiro heads outside to check if the rope bridge to the mansion is burning, she accidentally destroys it. Not wanting to admit this, Nagumo and Mashiro play along when another guest suggests there is a killer at the party trying to recreate the family massacre. Asunaro gets dragged into the act and accuses one of the guests, Megumi Shiraishi, of being the killer. To everyone's surprise, she admits to planning her revenge after being the sole survivor of the massacre. Back at the office, Mashiro tells Nagumo that Shiraishi's family was actually alive and Kuroi was at the dinner the whole time, so everyone was misguided at the party. Maki-chan joins Nagumo at a bar and both rant about how modern culture has passed them by. Maki-chan soon realizes she has been too honest about her age and awkwardly tries to take back what she said.
5	"Welcome to the World of Grown-Ups"; Transliteration: "Otona no Sekai e Yōkoso" (Japanese: 大人の世界へようこそ)	Rion Kujō	Rintarō Ikeda	Isoroku Koga	July 29, 2025
5	"A Midsummer Thriller"; Transliteration: "Manatsu no Soriddo Shichuēshon" (Japanese: 真夏のソリッド・シチュエーション)	Naoki Taira	Rintarō Ikeda	Isoroku Koga	July 29, 2025
5	"Mashiro and the Agent from the Stars"; Transliteration: "Mashiro to Hoshi no Ējento" (Japanese: 真白と星のエージェント)	Naoki Taira	Rintarō Ikeda	Isoroku Koga	July 29, 2025
Nagumo takes Mashiro to a fancy bar called Tonto. There, the barkeep eventually tells Nagumo that someone has been repeatedly spraying graffiti outside. Nagumo quickly deduces that Veronica, one of the regulars, is the culprit. Afterwards, Mashiro swears never to go back to that bar. An anonymous client sends a request to the Nagumo Detective Agency with an advance payment. As Asunaro and both assistants join them, they suddenly get locked into a building where "Mister X" challenges them to a quiz game. Despite failing most of the questions, Maki-chan and Mashiro combine their talents to uncover the room where Mister X is hiding. Maki-chan then beats him up. Mashiro shows off her latest purchase, an expensive wiretap detector, and finds that someone planted a bug on the floor below. After a while, Nagumo introduces Mashiro to the self-proclaimed "star inventor of Shinjuku," Azuha Hoshino. Azusa uses her latest invention, a megaphone, to overload the audio bug, and the group finds a pizza deliveryman outside clutching his ears in pain as the culprit. The following day, Mashiro uses Azuha's megaphone to wake up Nagumo, but also shakes out multiple thieves who were hiding in the office.
6	"Mashiro Hosts Girls' Night Out"; Transliteration: "Mashiro, Joshi-kai o Hiraku" (Japanese: 真白、女子会を開く)	Kazuya Fujishiro	Rintarō Ikeda	Rion Kujō	August 5, 2025
6	"Assistant Switch!!"; Transliteration: "Joshu Kōtai!!" (Japanese: 助手交代!!)	Kazuya Fujishiro	Rintarō Ikeda	Rion Kujō	August 5, 2025
6	"Battle to the Death at 100° Celsius"; Transliteration: "Sesshi Hyaku-do no Shitō" (Japanese: 摂氏100℃の死闘)	Rion Kujō	Rintarō Ikeda	Rion Kujō	August 5, 2025
Mashiro hosts a Girls' Night Out with Maki-chan and Azuha at a nearby izakaya. While a drunk Maki-chan refuses to reveal her real age, she does admit that she admires Asunaro and the reason why she that she likes to wear a poncho. Elsewhere, Nagumo struggles with the menu at a different izakaya while Nezu and Asunaro argue with each other. Nagumo gets sick and tired of Mashiro breaking his property, resulting in her storming out and switching places with Maki-chan for a day. Maki-chan helps Nagumo with interviewing the case of someone being stalked and harassed in their neighborhood. Meanwhile, Asunaro and Mashiro are looking for a pervert that has been terrorizing the community. After said pervert appears, Mashiro struggles to catch him, but chases him down to the same neighborhood where Nagumo and Maki-chan are. Afterward, Nagumo admits that he was bored without Mashiro around and welcomes her back. Nagumo tries to enjoy a sauna when an escaped criminal suddenly enters. The two try to one-up each other until an old man fills the sauna with so much steam it knocks both men out. Nagumo wakes up in the locker room to find the suspect was re-arrested.
7	"Nagumo's Grown-up Allure"; Transliteration: "Nagumo-san no Otona no Iroke" (Japanese: 名雲さんの大人の色気)	Tatsuya Shiraishi	Rintarō Ikeda	Takumi Nitta	August 12, 2025
7	"The Lost Child and Mashiro"; Transliteration: "Maigo to Mashiro" (Japanese: 迷子と真白)	Tatsuya Shiraishi	Rintarō Ikeda	Tatsuya Shiraishi	August 12, 2025
7	"The Great Detective vs. Phantom Thief, Riverfake"; Transliteration: "Meitantei vs Kaitō Ribā Feiku" (Japanese: 名探偵 vs 怪盗リバーフェイク)	Tatsuya Shiraishi	Rintarō Ikeda	Tatsuya Shiraishi	August 12, 2025
Mashiro wants to drink black coffee to seem like a "mature" woman to Nagumo. Azuha offers her a pill to help her, but Mashiro soon finds out it comes with aphrodisiac-like side effects. After Mashiro apologizes, Nagumo offers her a café au lait instead, though she spits it out anyway as the milk used for it was sour. A lost child calling herself "Beaver Fuu" asks Mashiro for help finding her parents. Nagumo eventually deduces from Fuu-chan's actions that she already knew Mashiro and Asunaro before meeting them. Suddenly, Mimasaka appears and addresses Fuu-chan as his daughter. Fuu-chan then proclaims that she will become the "Phantom Thief Beaver" and steals Nagumo's wallet. Fuu-chan demonstrates her love of thievery by stealing various items from Nagumo's office when the local news reports that a Phantom Thief named Riverfake has left a calling card that he intends to steal "The Smile" painting. While Fuu-chan is enraptured by Riverfake, her father calls in Nagumo and Mashiro to help out. Riverfake is ultimately taken down by Fuu-chan. Afterwards, Fuu-chan demonstrates one last act of thievery by stealing Nagumo's present from the gift box that Mimasaka sent to him.
8	"Nagumo's Cyber Case File"; Transliteration: "Nagumo no Saibā Jikenbo" (Japanese: 名雲のサイバー事件簿)	Isoroku Koga	Yūho Togashi	Isoroku Koga	August 19, 2025
8	"The Phantom Thief's Method"; Transliteration: "Kaitō no Mesoddo" (Japanese: 怪盗のメソッド)	Isoroku Koga	Rintarō Ikeda	Isoroku Koga	August 19, 2025
8	"A Detective Assistant's Day Off"; Transliteration: "Tantei Joshu no Kyūjitsu" (Japanese: 探偵助手の休日)	Isoroku Koga	Yūho Togashi	Isoroku Koga	August 19, 2025
After interrogating a man who claims to have no memory of the crime he committed, Maki-chan believes a VTuber named Yomoya Hikari might be using their YouTube channel to spread "digital drugs" that brainwash their followers into committing crimes without realizing it. The group watches one of the VTuber's videos to test the claim, only for Mashiro to suddenly turn into a monster and jump out the window. Maki-chan tries to get the cops to help but they only arrest a local pervert instead of Mashiro. As Mashiro struggles to fight the brainwashing, Maki-chan tries commanding her to go home like a dog, causing Mashiro to go to the "home" of the men behind Yomoya Hikari instead and chase them into the open where the "Big Four Creepy Old Dudes" take them down. Fuu-chan spends the day practicing her Phantom Thief skills, only to be foiled by the eccentricities of the Big Four Creepy Old Dudes. Maki-chan goes through a routine on her day off when Asunaro calls her in the evening to work on another case.
9	"Take Good Care of Your Smartphone"; Transliteration: "Sumaho no Kanri wa Shikkari to" (Japanese: スマホの管理はしっかりと)	Kōji Aritomi	Rintarō Ikeda	Katsuyuki Kodera	August 26, 2025
9	"Maki-chan and Asunaro"; Transliteration: "Maki-chan to Asunaro" (Japanese: マキちゃんとアスナロ)	Kōji Aritomi	Rintarō Ikeda	Katsuyuki Kodera	August 26, 2025
When Mashiro loses her smartphone, she discovers it is in the hands of an unknown thief. The thief tells Mashiro to complete a series of seemingly impossible tasks for hints on where he left the phone. To his surprise, she completes every task given. Elsewhere, Asunaro and Maki-chan talks about the "Serial Smartphone Molester", who tries to make women lose his impossible challenges so he can enjoy their agony and shame up close. As the man decides to give up on Mashiro, Fuu-chan steals Mashiro's phone back, and tortures him with the help of Nipple-Tasting Man, before turning his true identity over to her father. It is later revealed the Serial Smartphone Molester tried the same act on Azuha the previous day, only for the phone to literally blow up in his face. At Nagumo's birthday party, Asunaro recounts how Maki-chan became his assistant. Nagumo then recounts the time he opened his detective agency. This is followed by Asunaro recounting his first case with Maki-chan.
10	"Catch the Sneak Photographer!"; Transliteration: "Tōsatsu-ma o Tsukamaero!" (Japanese: 盗撮魔を捕まえろ!)	Yū Harima	Rintarō Ikeda	Yū Harima	September 2, 2025
10	"The Bullet Bride"; Transliteration: "Dangan Hanayome" (Japanese: 弾丸花嫁)	Yū Harima	Rintarō Ikeda	Yū Harima	September 2, 2025
A water park called Sunday Land hires Nagumo to discreetly find a sneak photographer known as "Uncle Scoop," who has been taking pictures of women changing in their locker room. After Nagumo and his friends accidentally sabotage each other and attack the wrong person, Maki-chan proceeds to catch the real Uncle Scoop, who turns out to be a woman. Afterwards, Mashiro discovers that a video of herself in her swimsuit was uploaded on Discovery Channel's YouTube channel as part of a series on baboon courtship. Nagumo prepares to attend an outdoor wedding with Mimasaka in honor of a mutual colleague, while Mashiro and Nezu invite themselves. A typhoon hits the area on the day of the ceremony, but the guests and the couple refuse to leave and try to continue the wedding as planned. When the bride does the bouquet toss, she throws it away from the venue, eventually becoming a giant ball of junk. This does not deter most of the women from trying to chase it down, however. Once the ball finally comes to a stop, Maki-chan emerges victorious.
11	"Mashiro and the Psychic of Love"; Transliteration: "Mashiro to Ai no Reinōryoku-sha" (真白と愛の霊能力者)	Tatsuya Shiraishi	Rintarō Ikeda	Tatsuya Shiraishi	September 9, 2025
Yuji, a man from the rural village of Ideoto, asks Nagumo to help him rescue his beloved wife Rin and expose a cult leader named Airen, offering to pay 5 million yen. Once they arrive in Ideoto, Mashiro gets in a protracted battle with the musclebound shamaness while Nagumo interviews Airen and various villagers. When Mashiro finally subdues the shamaness, she rushes to the public square as Rin is burned at the stake, but Nagumo stops her from intervening. Later, Nagumo takes Mashiro and Yuji to a building to reveal that Airen faked Rin's death. Airen explains that he is actually a medical doctor who noticed Rin was suffering from a disease so he pretended to be a religious figure in order to help her. The shamaness and the villagers overhear this and call for their blood, only to be subdued by a battalion of city police officers Nagumo called. Mashiro and Nagumo return to the office to find a note from the landlord threatening them with eviction if they do not pay 2.5 million yen by tomorrow, and the payment Yuji gave them is Ideoto's currency that converts to 50,000 yen.
12	"Nagumo Dons the Haori"; Transliteration: "Nagumo, Haoru" (Japanese: 名雲、羽織る)	Rion Kujō	Rintarō Ikeda	Rion Kujō	September 16, 2025
12	"Producing Nagumo Detective Agency"; Transliteration: "Nagumo Tantei Jimusho o Purodūsu" (Japanese: 名雲探偵事務所をプロデュース)	Rion Kujō	Rintarō Ikeda	Rion Kujō	September 16, 2025
12	"Nagumo Detective Agency Shuts Down"; Transliteration: "Nagumo Tantei Jimusho, Shōmetsu" (Japanese: 名雲探偵事務所、消滅)	Rion Kujō	Rintarō Ikeda	Rion Kujō	September 16, 2025
After entering into the "Sarutobi" competition, Mashiro discovers too late that she put Nagumo's name down as the official contestant. She proceeds to piggyback under his clothes. Near the end of the competition, Nagumo is disqualified when he slips from Mashiro's grip. With twelve hours left, Nagumo notices a small Asunaro doll on the desk, leading Nezu to propose they sell themed merchandise. However, thanks to several factors, Nagumo is forced to lick the landlord's shoes to buy more time. With only six hours left, Asunaro and Maki-chan ask Nagumo to help them with a high-paying job involving the corrupt Deputy Superintendent of the Tokyo MPD and a notorious crime boss. Maki-chan and Mashiro go undercover at a nearby maid café. The group then follows the crime boss to a nearby aquarium, and catch both him and the police official making a deal. After a series of miscues, the crime boss reveals he was simply there on vacation and he was just "smuggling" an embarrassing café card. The following day, Nezu and Mashiro deliver the news that their merchandise actually sold out, driving several more cases to the agency. As a result, they are saved from eviction.

== Reception ==
By August 2024, the series had over 900,000 copies in circulation.

== See also ==
- Senryu Girl, another manga series by the same author
- Tune In to the Midnight Heart, another manga series by the same author
