= Momoko Seto =

Japanese voice actress (born 2004)

- 瀬戸 桃子
- Born: August 17, 2004 (age 22); Saitama Prefecture, Japan
- Occupation: Voice actress
- Years active: 2023–present
- Agent: Toy's Factory
- Notable work: Umamusume: Cinderella Gray as Belno Light; Tune In to the Midnight Heart as Rikka Inohana; In the Clear Moonlit Dusk as Kotobuki Hibiya

Momoko Seto (瀬戸 桃子, Seto Momoko; born August 17, 2004) is a Japanese voice actress. She is affiliated with Toy's Factory. She began her career in 2023 after passing an audition, and in 2026 she played her first main role as Rikka Inohana in the anime television series Tune In to the Midnight Heart.

== Biography ==
Seto was born in Saitama Prefecture on August 17, 2004. From an early age, she had an attention-seeking personality, having been inspired by Crayon Shin-chan to cheer people up with her antics. She also often served as class representative in school.

Her interest in anime began at a young age, having grown up on shows such as Pretty Cure, Aikatsu!, and Pretty Rhythm. Initially, she thought that anime characters were real, but after realizing that people provided voices for them, she developed an interest in voice acting. Her growing interest was also influenced by a friend who was into late-night anime. Initially, she told her family that she was aiming to be a radio DJ as she felt it was difficult to explain to them her goal of becoming a voice actress. She decided to pursue voice acting training after learning that a senior at her school had also pursued a voice acting career, enrolling at the training school Human Academy.

Seto began her career while still a high school student, becoming affiliated with the talent agency Digital Double. She made her voice acting debut as the character Fūka Tatara in the 2023 anime series Liar Liar. The role had been offered to the winner of an audition for students at Human Academy. At the time, she was not confident about getting the role as she had only been training for four months, and she was surprised to get the role. Six months after her voice acting debut, she was cast as the character Belno Light in the anime series Umamusume: Cinderella Gray, although she only started recording her lines the following year, with the series premiering in 2025. She left Digital Double in May 2024 as the company prepared to cease operations. She subsequently joined the agency High Pine and remained with them until May 31, 2025; she joined the agency Toy's Factory the following day.

In 2026, Seto voiced the character Rikka Inohana in the anime series Tune In to the Midnight Heart, where she sang multiple songs for the series.

== Filmography ==
=== Anime ===
2023

- Liar, Liar, Fūka Tatara

2024

- Tales of Wedding Rings, cat people
- VTuber Legend, extroverted high school girls

2025

- Catch Me at the Ballpark!, Kokoro
- Umamusume: Cinderella Gray, Belno Light

2026

- Tune In to the Midnight Heart, Rikka Inohana
- In the Clear Moonlit Dusk, Kotobuki Hibiya
- Classroom of the Elite, Ichika Amasawa
