= Rika Tachibana =

Japanese voice actress, singer, and model (born 1987)

- 立花 理香
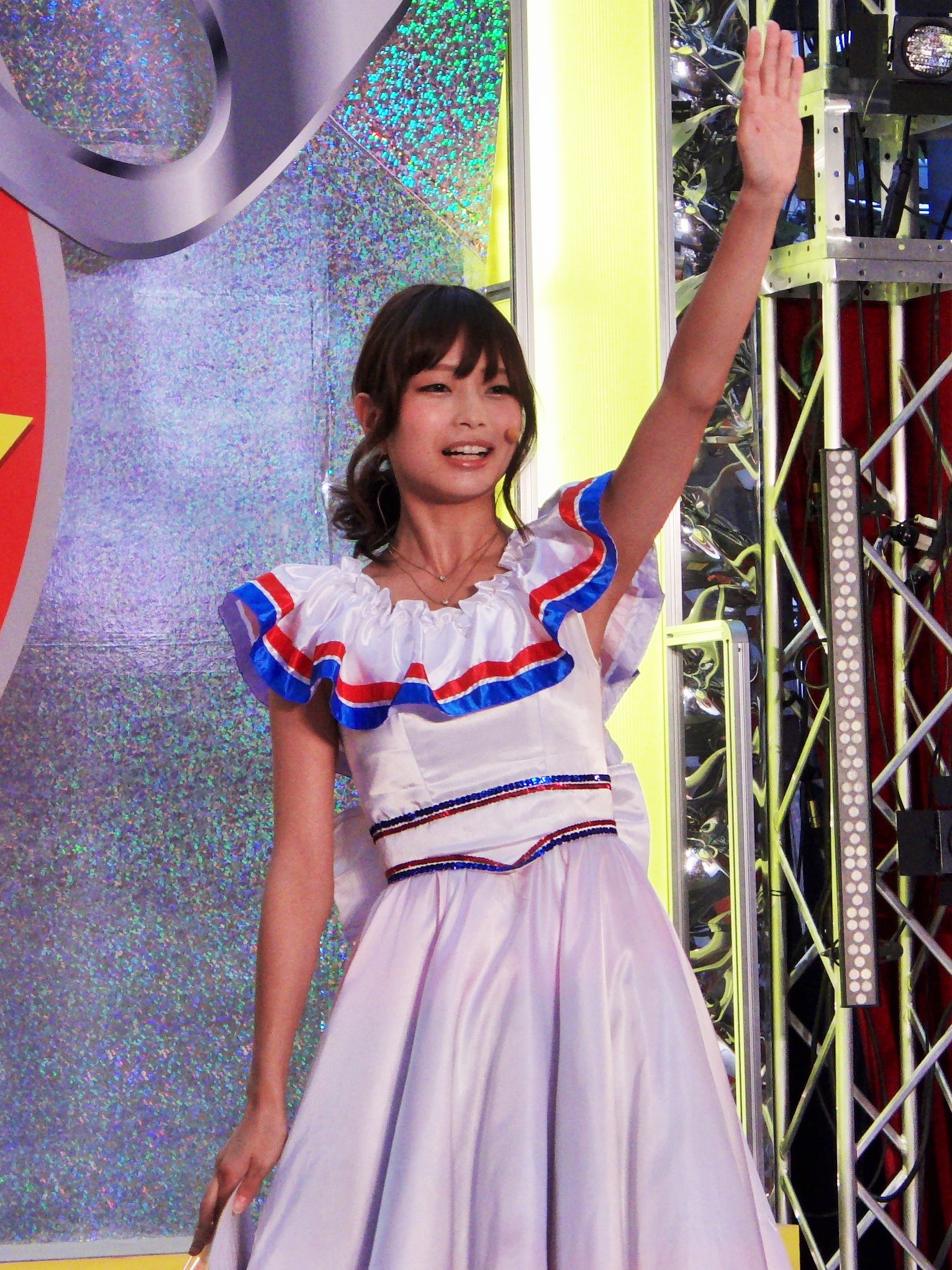
- Rika Tachibana in 2012
- Born: February 27, 1987 (age 39); Hiroshima, Japan
- Other name: Ricca Tachibana
- Occupations: Voice actress; singer; model
- Years active: 2015–present
- Agent: EARLY WING
- Height: 155 cm (5 ft 1 in)
- Spouse: Kenya Wakatsuki (m. 2019)
- Musical career
- Genre: J-pop
- Instrument: Vocals
- Years active: 2018–present

Rika Tachibana (立花 理香, Tachibana Rika; born February 27, 1987), also romanized as Ricca Tachibana, is a Japanese voice actress, singer and model. She worked at the Holy Peak talent agency until 2018. She is represented by With Line since February 2019. In July 2019, she transferred to PUGNUS. She married baseball catcher Kenya Wakatsuki on December 28, 2019.

== Filmography ==
=== Anime ===
- The Idolmaster Cinderella Girls - Sae Kobayakawa
- Shomin Sample - Reiko Arisugawa
- Ange Vierge - Code Ω77 Stella
- Scorching Ping Pong Girls - Sachiko Sasorida
- Kemono Friends - African Wild Dog
- Chou Yuu Sekai: Being the Reality - Hakuu
- Between the Sky and Sea - Namino Murakami
- Joshi Kausei - Momoko Futo
- Hachigatsu no Cinderella Nine - Aoi Asada
- The Island of Giant Insects - Naruse Chitose
- Princess Connect! Re:Dive - Kiruya Momochi
- Assault Lily Bouquet - Ena Banshōya
- Girls' Frontline - Super SASS
- Saving 80,000 Gold in Another World for My Retirement - Colette
- Liar, Liar - Noa Akizuki
- Catch Me at the Ballpark! - Yuki Takino

=== Video games ===
- Idol Death Game TV – Hime Asahikawa
- Tokyo 7th Sisters – Kazumi Katsuragi
- The Idolmaster Cinderella Girls – Sae Kobayakawa
- Kobayashi ga Kawai Sugite Tsurai!! Game Demo Kyun Moe MAX – Shizuka-Chan
- Aegis of Earth: Protonovus Assault
- Nekomimi Survival! – Setsuna, Yaya, Stella
- Magia Record (2018) – Ria Ami
- Food Fantasy (2018) – Bibimbap
- Granblue Fantasy – Yuisis, Kyaru
- Girls' Frontline – Super SASS, MK48
- Princess Connect! Re:Dive – Kyaru
- Crash Fever - Sima Qian
- Azur Lane – RN Carabiniere, KMS August Von Parseval
- Street Fighter V – Lucia
- Arknights – Plume, Gravel
- Senran Kagura Peach Beach Splash – Yuyaki
- Kick-Flight – Ruriha
- Alchemy Stars (2022) – Rinne
- Two Jong Cell!! (2022) – Sazanka Rikugien
- A Certain Magical Index: Imaginary Fest (2022) – Dion Fortune
- Towa Tsugai (2023) – Hakuchou

=== Drama CD ===
- Saint Seiya: Saintia Shō - Ruin no Ate
