= Tomoki Kikuya =

Japanese music composer (born 1968)

Tomoki Kikuya 菊谷 知樹
- Born: February 21, 1968 (age 58); Tokyo, Japan
- Genres: Soundtrack; anime song; J-pop
- Occupations: Composer; arranger; guitarist
- Instruments: Guitar
- Years active: 2005–present
- Label: Popholic

Tomoki Kikuya (菊谷 知樹, Kikuya Tomoki; born 21 February 1968) is a Japanese composer, arranger and guitarist. Kikuya is best known for composing original soundtracks for anime series, including most notably Nisekoi, Eromanga Sensei, Bocchi the Rock!, Yuuna and the Haunted Hot Springs, A Sister's All You Need, and Higehiro. He is represented by the music production company Popholic.

== Biography ==
Kikuya was born in Tokyo, in 1968. His mother was a piano teacher, so he has had contact with music since an early age. He started his musician career in 1992, when in college, as a member of the rock band Mustang A.K.A., which lasted for two years. Later, he worked as a guitarist in the band Funanori. After that, besides guitar, he learned a wide range of musical instruments.

In 2005, after joining Popholic, Kikuya made his debut as a composer in the anime Tona-Gura!. Since then, he has been active as a songwriter, providing the scores for anime series, as well as elaborating music to artists.

== Works ==
Year	Title	Note(s)	Ref.
2006	Tona-Gura!		
2007	Hidamari Sketch		
2007	Potemayo		
2008	Kyōran Kazoku Nikki		
2009	Samurai Harem: Asu no Yoichi		
2010	Cat Planet Cuties		
2010	Squid Girl		
2011	I Don't Like You at All, Big Brother!!		
2012	Sengoku Collection		
2013	The "Hentai" Prince and the Stony Cat.		
2014	No-Rin		
2014	Nisekoi		
2014	The Comic Artist and His Assistants		
2014	Bakumatsu Rock		
2016	Girlish Number		
2017	Eromanga Sensei		
2017	Blend S		
2017	A Sister's All You Need		
2018	Yuuna and the Haunted Hot Springs		
2019	Wasteful Days of High School Girls		
2021	Higehiro		
2021	Life Lessons with Uramichi Oniisan	Opening theme song composer and arranger	
2021	Drugstore in Another World		
2021	Mother of the Goddess' Dormitory		
2022	Harem in the Labyrinth of Another World		
2022	KJ File	Ending theme song composer	
2022	Bocchi the Rock!		
2022	The Little Lies We All Tell		
2024	Oblivion Battery	Other tracks by Hiroko Yamasaki	
2024	Negative Positive Angler		
2025	Detectives These Days Are Crazy!		
2025	Li'l Miss Vampire Can't Suck Right		
2026	Kirio Fan Club		
2026	Iron Wok Jan		
2026	Even the Student Council Has Its Holes!		
