= Kirio Fan Club =

Japanese manga series

- First tankōbon volume cover

霧尾ファンクラブ (Kirio Fan Kurabu)
- Genre: Romantic comedy
- Manga
- Written by: Ponchan Chikyū no Osakana
- Published by: Jitsugyo no Nihon Sha
- English publisher: NA: Kodansha USA
- Imprint: Ruelle Comics
- Magazine: Comic Ruelle
- Original run: June 24, 2022 – August 9, 2024
- Volumes: 6
- Manga

Spin-off
- Written by: Ponchan Chikyū No Osakana
- Published by: Jitsugyo no Nihon Sha
- Imprint: Ruelle Comics
- Magazine: Comic Ruelle
- Original run: October 18, 2024 – February 21, 2025
- Volumes: 1
- Television drama
- Directed by: Hatsuki Yokoo
- Produced by: Miwa Kurito (chief, CTV MID ENJIN); Megumi Hoshino (AX-ON)
- Written by: Nanoha Ito
- Music by: Sōichi Ueda
- Studio: Chukyo TV
- Original network: NNS (Chukyo TV, Nippon TV)
- Original run: April 2, 2025 – June 5, 2025
- Episodes: 10
- Anime television series
- Directed by: Sō Toyama
- Written by: Aya Satsuki
- Music by: Tomoki Kikuya
- Studio: Satelight
- Licensed by: Sentai Filmworks: SEA: Medialink
- Original network: JNN (MBS, TBS), AT-X
- Original run: April 2, 2026 – June 18, 2026
- Episodes: 12
- icon

Kirio Fan Club (Japanese: 霧尾ファンクラブ, Hepburn: Kirio Fan Kurabu) is a Japanese manga series written and illustrated by Ponchan Chikyū no Osakana. It was serialized online via Jitsugyo no Nihon Sha's Comic Ruelle website from June 2022 to August 2024 and was collected in six tankōbon volumes. A television drama adaptation aired from April to June 2025. An anime television series adaptation produced by Satelight aired from April to June 2026.

== Plot ==
High school girls Aimi and Nami are both best friends and rivals for the affection of Ken, even though neither can bring themselves to talk to him; instead, they engage in fantasies involving Ken. Ken, however, is not great at soccer despite being in the soccer club, has mediocre grades, and tends to have a quiet personality. All three have secrets they would rather not share. Eventually, their classmates begin to push them to become more involved with each other.

== Characters ==
Aimi Miyoshi (三好藍美, Miyoshi Aimi)
Voiced by: Nene Hieda (Japanese); Elissa Cuellar (English)
Portrayed by: Mizuki Kayashima
Nami Sometani (染谷波, Sometani Nami)
Voiced by: Shion Wakayama (Japanese); Cat Thomas (English)
Portrayed by: Riko
Ken Kirio (霧尾賢, Kirio Ken)
Voiced by: Gakuto Kajiwara (Japanese); Scott Gibbs (English)
Portrayed by: Mizuki Inoue
Mitsuru Manda (満田充, Manda Mitsuru)
Voiced by: Yūya Hirose (Japanese); Benjamin McLaughlin (English)
Portrayed by: Jiei Wakabayashi
Hayato Momose (桃瀬隼斗, Momose Hayato)
Voiced by: Jin Ogasawara (Japanese); Jeremy Gee (English)
Portrayed by: Rio Komiya
Satsuki Muraoka (村岡皐月, Muraoka Satsuki)
Voiced by: Ayasa Itō (Japanese); Skylar Sinclair (English)
Portrayed by: Yuna Hoshino
Seira Tashiro (田代星羅, Tashiro Seira)
Voiced by: Fūka Izumi (Japanese); Brittney Karbowski (English)
Portrayed by: Aine Hara
Kanta Morino (森野寛太, Morino Kanta)
Portrayed by: Akira Ōhashi

== Media ==
=== Manga ===
Written and illustrated by Ponchan Chikyū no Osakana, Kirio Fan Club was serialized online via Jitsugyo no Nihon Sha's Comic Ruelle website from June 24, 2022, to August 9, 2024. Its chapters were compiled into six tankōbon volumes from December 15, 2022, to September 19, 2024.

A five-chapter spin-off manga also illustrated by Chikyū No Osakana was serialized on the same website from October 18, 2024, to February 21, 2025. The spin-off's chapters were compiled into a single tankōbon volume released on April 17, 2025.

During their panel at Anime Expo 2025, Kodansha USA announced that they had licensed the series for English publication beginning in Q2 2026.

No.	Original release date	Original ISBN	English release date	English ISBN
1	December 15, 2022	978-4-408-64076-1	April 28, 2026	978-1-647-29528-8
2	May 18, 2023	978-4-408-64093-8	June 23, 2026	978-1-647-29529-5
3	October 19, 2023	978-4-408-64107-2	August 18, 2026	978-1-647-29530-1
4	April 18, 2024	978-4-408-64132-4	October 13, 2026	978-1-647-29531-8
5	July 18, 2024	978-4-408-64141-6	—	—
6	September 19, 2024	978-4-408-64150-8	—	—
FC	April 17, 2025	978-4-408-64184-3	—	—

=== Drama ===
A television drama adaptation was announced on September 15, 2024. The series is produced by Chukyo TV and directed by Hatsuki Yokoo, with Miwa Kurito as the screenwriter and Sōichi Ueda composing the music. The series aired from April 2 to June 5, 2025, on the Wednesday Platinum Night block on all NNS affiliates, including Chukyo TV and Nippon TV.

=== Anime ===
An anime adaptation was also announced on September 15, 2024. It is produced by Satelight and directed by Sō Toyama, with series composition and screenplays by Aya Satsuki, characters designed by Nami Hayashi, and music composed by Tomoki Kikuya. The series premiered on April 2, 2026, on the Super Animeism Turbo programming block on all JNN affiliates, including MBS and TBS. (Note: MBS and TBS listed the series premiere on April 2 at 24:26, which is effectively April 3 at 12:26 a.m. JST.) The opening theme song is "Fanclub", performed by Skirt and ODD Foot Works, while the ending theme song is "Harmony" (ハーモニー), performed by Ako. Sentai Filmworks licensed the series in North America for streaming on Hidive. Medialink licensed the series for streaming on Ani-One Asia's YouTube channel. HIDIVE announced that this show will receive an English dub which will premiere on June 10, 2026.

==== Episodes ====
No.	Title	Directed by (Note: Production staff information is taken from the ending credits of each episode.)	Storyboarded by	Original release date
1	"Dear Kirio-kun"; Transliteration: "Haikei, Kirio-kun" (Japanese: 拝啓、霧尾くん)	Tōru Hamazaki	Sō Toyama	April 3, 2026
Aimi and Nami are best friends united by their mutual one-sided crush on their classmate Kirio. Every day they bond over things like playing out pretend conversations while impersonating him & fantasizing about his farts. While attempting to return Kirio's jacket to him after school one day, the two's rivalry leads to Aimi dropping the jacket out the window, where it gets stuck on a tree. They disrupt a classmate's love confession to return it to Kirio's desk. On another day, Aimi mentions an elaborate dream where she went on a date with Kirio. When the events of that dream start coming true, Nami interferes to keep a date from happening. That night, Nami looks lovingly at pictures of her & Aimi, hinting that Nami actually has a crush on Aimi.
2	"When I Saw Your Tears That Day"; Transliteration: "Ano hi Mita Kimi no Namida" (Japanese: あの日見た君の涙)	Kōsuke Shimotori	Natsumi Higashida	April 10, 2026 (Note: Due to coverage of the 2026 Masters Tournament, this episode aired at 1:58 a.m. JST, 1 hour and 32 minutes after the original air time on MBS.)
3	"Dragon Kirio"; Transliteration: "Doragon Kirio" (Japanese: ドラゴンキリオ)	Yasuyuki Fuse	Sō Toyama	April 17, 2026
4	"Treasured Moments"; Transliteration: "Taisetsu na Jikan" (Japanese: 大切な時間)	Yūto Nakamura	Moe Kato	April 24, 2026
5	"May I Stan You?"; Transliteration: "Oshitemo Ii desu ka?" (Japanese: 推してもいいですか？)	Ryo Okubo	Chihiro Kumano	May 1, 2026
6	"Secrets"; Transliteration: "Kakushigoto" (Japanese: かくしごと)	Hayato Nakamura; Shōgo Matsuda	Hiroshi Hara	May 8, 2026
7	"School Trip Magic"; Transliteration: "Shuugaku Ryokou Magic" (Japanese: 修学旅行マジック)	Yasuyuki Fuse	Noriaki Saitō	May 15, 2026
8	"Steamy, Spicy, Red-hot Night"; Transliteration: "Atttttsui Yoru " (Japanese: アッッッッツい夜)	Sō Toyama	Moe Kato	May 22, 2026
9	"Can't Say It, Won't Say It."; Transliteration: "Ienai, Iwanai." (Japanese: 言えない、言わない。)	Yūto Nakamura	Yūto Nakamura	May 29, 2026
10	"I Hear Kirio's Quitting the Team"; Transliteration: "Kirio, Bukatsu Yamerutte yo" (Japanese: 霧尾、部活やめるってよ)	Kōsuke Shimotori	Noriaki Saitō	June 5, 2026
11	"Always Lying"; Transliteration: "Zutto Uso Tsuiteta" (Japanese: ずっと嘘ついてた)	Sō Toyama	Noriaki Saitō	June 11, 2026
12	"Kirio Fan Club"; Transliteration: "Kirio Fan Kurabu" (Japanese: 霧尾ファンクラブ)	Tōru Hamazaki	Tōru Hamazaki; Sō Toyama	June 18, 2026

== Reception ==
The series was ranked sixth in the 2024 edition of Takarajimasha's Kono Manga ga Sugoi! guidebook for the best manga for female readers. The series was ranked tenth in the 2025 edition.
