= Bi-Beast =

- The Bi-Beast's first appearance on the cover of The Incredible Hulk (vol. 2) #169 (November 1973). Art by Herb Trimpe.

Publication information
- Publisher: Marvel Comics
- First appearance: The Incredible Hulk (vol. 2) #169 (November 1973)
- Created by: Steve Englehart; Herb Trimpe

In-story information
- Team affiliations: Masters of Evil; Sinister Sixteen
- Abilities: Superhuman strength, stamina, durability, and intelligence

The Bi-Beast is a fictional character appearing in American comic books published by Marvel Comics.

== Publication history ==
The Bi-Beast first appeared in The Incredible Hulk (vol. 2) #169 (November 1973) and was created by Herb Trimpe and Steve Englehart, who described it as "just another idea for something powerful/impressive enough to fight the Hulk."

== Fictional character biography ==
The Bi-Beast is a two-headed android created by an avian subspecies of the Inhumans. After the species dies under unknown circumstances, the Bi-Beast is left alone in their city. Years later, the creature sees the Harpy with Bruce Banner, and is reminded of his masters. The Bi-Beast captures them both and instructs Banner to fix the machinery in the city. Banner instead chooses to cure Harpy. The Bi-Beast learns of Banner's deception and fights Banner's alter-ego the Hulk, but is distracted when an A.I.M. strike force led by MODOK attacks the city. Bi-Beast activates a self-destruct mechanism and dies in the explosion.

A cylinder containing a second Bi-Beast is ejected from the city at the moment of the explosion. The cylinder is retrieved and taken to a Helicarrier, where the Bi-Beast awakens. Possessing the memories of the first Bi-Beast, it decides to take control of the Helicarrier and attack major metropolitan cities, believing humanity to be responsible for the extinction of his creators. General Thunderbolt Ross becomes aware of the danger and forcibly inserts Bruce Banner into the helicarrier, where he changes into the Hulk and battles the Bi-Beast once more. The two fall mid-battle through an opening activated by S.H.I.E.L.D., and plunge many miles to the ocean. The Bi-Beast disappears and is assumed to have drowned.

The Bi-Beast is eventually captured by the Stranger for study and taken to the Stranger's laboratory world. With the other captives, the Bi-Beast escapes and attacks the Stranger, but is defeated by Power Princess. He later returns to Earth, and battles the Hulk and She-Hulk, although Bi-Beast's effectiveness is compromised when one of his heads develops an attraction to the latter.

A duplicate of Bi-Beast later appears as a member of the Masters of Evil and the Sinister Sixteen.

== Powers and abilities ==
The Bi-Beast is a highly advanced android who rivals the Hulk in terms of physical prowess. Additionally, he possesses an extensive knowledge of Avian warfare, culture and science.

== In other media ==
=== Television ===
- Bi-Beast makes non-speaking appearances in The Avengers: Earth's Mightiest Heroes.
- Bi-Beast appears in Marvel Disk Wars: The Avengers, voiced by Hajime Iijima in Japanese and Richard Epcar in English.

=== Video games ===
Bi-Beast appears in The Incredible Hulk film tie-in game, with the top head voiced by Keith Ferguson and the bottom head voiced by Chris Edgerly. This version was created by the Enclave.

== Reception ==
In 2016, Bi-Beast was ranked the tenth greatest Hulk villain by ComicsAlliance. He has also been included in various rankings of characters related to the Hulk.
