= Catch Me at the Ballpark! =

Japanese manga series

- First tankōbon volume cover, featuring Ruriko

ボールパークでつかまえて! (Bōrupāku de Tsukamaete!)
- Genre: Comedy, sports
- Manga
- Written by: Tatsurō Suga
- Published by: Kodansha
- Imprint: Morning KC
- Magazine: Morning
- Original run: September 3, 2020 – present
- Volumes: 20
- Anime television series
- Directed by: Jun'ichi Kitamura
- Written by: Shigeru Murakoshi
- Music by: Monaca
- Studio: EMT Squared
- Licensed by: Crunchyroll
- Original network: TXN (TV Tokyo), AT-X, BS NTV
- Original run: April 2, 2025 – June 18, 2025
- Episodes: 12
- icon

Catch Me at the Ballpark! (Japanese: ボールパークでつかまえて!, Hepburn: Bōrupāku de Tsukamaete!) is a Japanese manga series written and illustrated by Tatsurō Suga. It began serialization in Kodansha's seinen manga magazine Morning in September 2020. An anime television series adaptation produced by EMT Squared aired from April to June 2025.

== Plot ==
Murata is an office worker who regularly visits Chiba MotorSuns Stadium to take his mind off the stress from work. One day, he meets a gyaru beer vendor girl named Ruriko. After he becomes her first regular customer, they slowly develop a friendship with each encounter.

== Characters ==
=== Main ===
Ruriko (ルリコ)
Voiced by: Fairouz Ai
A beer vendor girl who works for Yuuhi Beer at Chiba MotorSuns Stadium. She is a gyaru who has a snaggletooth. While she does not know a lot about baseball, she still enjoys her job.
Kōtarō Murata (村田)
Voiced by: Satoshi Inomata
An office worker who is a fan of the Chiba MotorSuns. He visits the ballpark to take his mind off the stress from work. He becomes Ruriko's first regular customer.

=== Vendors ===
Aona (アオナ)
Voiced by: Ikumi Hasegawa
A fellow vendor girl and colleague of Ruriko's. She retires alongside her boyfriend Omatsu to follow her dream as a teacher.
Kokoro (こころ)
Voiced by: Momoko Seto
A fellow vendor girl and colleague of Ruriko's.
Sara (サラ)
Voiced by: Mayu Sagara
A fellow vendor girl and colleague of Ruriko's. She is the youngest of the group as she is in high school.
Kohinata (こひなた)
Voiced by: Maaya Uchida
A fellow vendor girl and colleague of Ruriko's. She is the oldest of the group.
Kazuki Omatsu (大松 かずき)
Voiced by: Satoshi Tanaka
A checker of the vendor girls. He's currently dating Aona and quietly retires on the same day as her.
Nakaizumi (中泉)
Voiced by: Yōji Ueda
A leader of the vendor girls' checkers.

=== Chiba MotorSuns ===
Kojiro Takino (コジロー, Takino Kojirō)
Voiced by: Hiroki Tōchi
A veteran right fielder for the MotorSuns and Yuki's husband and eventual father of their child. He was close to Mitsuteru Tsubaki, a former MotorSuns player, with the two being called the Double-T Duo.
Dennis Young (デニス・ヤング, Denisu Yangu)
Voiced by: Kentaro Tone
An American slugger from Chicago who is the third base and cleanup hitter for the MotorSuns. He develops a crush on Ruriko.
Anthony Bryan (ブライアン, Buraian)
Voiced by: Kō Bonkobara
An American player who is the designated hitter of the MotorSuns. He is married to a Japanese woman and they have opened a Puerto Rican restaurant in Tokyo.
Reto Mitsui (三井烈斗, Mitsui Reto)
Voiced by: Kazuhiro Nakaya
A starting pitcher for the MotorSuns and Kisa's boyfriend.
Kazuma Shishio (獅子尾一磨, Shishio Kazuma)
Voiced by: Chiaki Kobayashi
The talented and popular shortstop and leadoff hitter for the MotorSuns.
Ken Nokogirimiya (鋸山剣, Nokogirimiya Ken)
Voiced by: Jun Fukuyama
Left fielder for the MotorSuns.
Wataru Ichinomiya (一宮航, Ichinomiya Wataru)
Voiced by: Daiki Yamashita
A second baseman for the MotorSuns.
Hisanori Kawamatsu (川松 宣則, Kawamatsu Hisanori)
Voiced by: Takeo Yuusuke
The catcher for the MotorSuns.
Hiroshi Nanami (那波 浩志, Nanami Hiroshi)
Voiced by: Ken Mizukoshi
The closer for the MotorSuns.

=== Others ===
Sun-Shiro (サン四郎, Sanshiro)
The team's mascot in the form of a salamander. He wears uniform number 346, the individual digits sound like his name when read aloud in Japanese. He is later revealed to be the other half of the Double-T Duo, Mitsuteru Tsubaki.
Nagisa Satō (佐藤なぎさ, Satō Nagisa)
Voiced by: Kiyono Yasuno
The MotorSuns' PA announcer. She has a crush on Nokogiriyama, whom she teases when she announces the lineups.
Marie Mori (森 まりえ, Mori Marie)
Voiced by: Hitomi Nabatame
A 40-year-old cook for the MotorSuns who likes to dote on the younger players.
Natsuno Yamada (山田夏乃, Yamada Natsuno)
Voiced by: Ayumi Mano
A young woman who works at Atsumori, a stall selling boxed meals in the ballpark. She develops a crush on Murata.
Atsumori's Manager (厚盛の店長, Atsumori no Tenchou)
Voiced by: Reigo Yamaguchi
The manager for the food stall Yamada works at.
Ryuichi Igarashi (五十嵐 龍一, Igarashi Ryūichi)
Voiced by: Jin Urayama
A veteran security guard at the ballpark.
Reiji Takimoto (滝本)
Voiced by: Chiharu Sawashiro
A new security guard at the ballpark. Igarashi helped him when he was lost at the ballpark back when he was 5 years old.
Yuki Takino (滝野ユキ, Takino Yuki)
Voiced by: Rika Tachibana
A local television announcer who is Kojiro's wife.
Kisa Kondō (近藤キサ, Kondō Kisa)
Voiced by: Wakana Kuramochi
Mitsui's girlfriend who supports him from the stands.
Hotaru Shimizu (清水ほたる, Shimizu Hotaru)
Voiced by: Atsuki Nakamura
Murata's co-worker who is also knowledgeable about baseball.
Miku (ミク)
Voiced by: Akari Yura
A little girl whose family regularly comes to MotorSuns games.
Miku's mother (ミクの母, Miku no haha)
Voiced by: Mami Fujita
A woman who regularly comes to MotorSuns games with her family.
Miku's father (ミクの父, Miku no chichi)
Voiced by: Kentarō Kumagai
A man who regularly comes to MotorSuns games with his family.
Fujinami (フジナミ)
Voiced by: Kento Shiraishi
One of three boisterous men, alongside Hige and Gori, who visit the ballpark trying to hit on women.
Hige (ヒゲ)
Voiced by: Kazumasu Fukagawa
One of three boisterous men, alongside Fujinami and Gori, who visit the ballpark trying to hit on women.
Gori (ゴリ)
Voiced by: Takayuki Nakatsukasa
One of three boisterous men, alongside Fujinami and Hige, who visit the ballpark trying to hit on women.

== Media ==
=== Manga ===
Written and illustrated by Tatsurō Suga, Catch Me at the Ballpark! began serialization in Kodansha's seinen manga magazine Morning on September 3, 2020. Its chapters have been compiled into twenty tankōbon volumes as of August 2026.

==== Volumes ====
No.	Release date	ISBN
1	January 21, 2021	978-4-06-521917-1
2	April 23, 2021	978-4-06-522806-7
3	July 20, 2021	978-4-06-524045-8
4	October 21, 2021	978-4-06-525129-4
5	January 21, 2022	978-4-06-526526-0
6	April 21, 2022	978-4-06-527395-1
7	July 22, 2022	978-4-06-528462-9
8	October 21, 2022	978-4-06-529529-8
9	January 23, 2023	978-4-06-530483-9
10	June 22, 2023	978-4-06-532027-3
11	September 22, 2023	978-4-06-532972-6
12	January 23, 2024	978-4-06-534353-1
13	April 23, 2024	978-4-06-535327-1
14	July 23, 2024	978-4-06-536212-9
15	November 21, 2024	978-4-06-537585-3
16	March 21, 2025	978-4-06-538845-7
17	June 23, 2025	978-4-06-539883-8
18	November 21, 2025	978-4-06-541443-9
19	April 23, 2026	978-4-06-543295-2
20	August 21, 2026	978-4-06-544701-7

=== Anime ===
An anime television series adaptation was announced on November 14, 2024. It was produced by EMT Squared and directed by Jun'ichi Kitamura, with series composition and screenplays by Shigeru Murakoshi, character designs by Fumio Iida, and music composed by Monaca. The series aired from April 2 to June 18, 2025, on TV Tokyo and its affiliates. (Note: TV Tokyo listed the series premiere on April 1, 2025, at 24:00, which is effectively April 2 at midnight JST.) The opening theme song is "Hurray!!", performed by GENIC, while the ending theme song is "Ballpark de Shake! Don't Shake!" (ボールパークでShake! Don't Shake!) by Fairouz Ai, Ikumi Hasegawa, Maaya Uchida, Mayu Sagara and Momoko Seto as their respective characters. Crunchyroll is streaming the series.

==== Episodes ====
No.	Title	Directed by (Note: Production staff information is taken from the ending credits of each episode.)	Storyboarded by	Original release date
1	"Ruriko the Beer Vendor Girl"; Transliteration: "Bīru Uriko no Ruriko-san" (Japanese: ビール売り子のルリコさん)	Jun'ichi Kitamura	Jun'ichi Kitamura	April 2, 2025
1	"Welcome, Regular"; Transliteration: "Jōren-san, Irasshai ♡" (Japanese: 常連さん、いらっしゃい♡)	Jun'ichi Kitamura	Jun'ichi Kitamura	April 2, 2025
1	"Candy and Tears"; Transliteration: "Ame to Namida" (Japanese: アメと涙)	Jun'ichi Kitamura	Jun'ichi Kitamura	April 2, 2025
Murata, a salaryman, regularly visits Chiba MotorSuns Stadium, the local ballpark, to relieve stress from work. During one game, he encounters an eccentric beer vendor named Ruriko, who makes a habit of teasing him. Murata is impressed with the confidence Ruriko projects, while Ruriko is happy she was able to successfully serve her first customer. At the next game, Ruriko meets Murata again, and manages to convince him to become her first regular customer after teasing him for thinking about ordering beer from another girl. At another game, Ruriko encounters a lost girl named Miku and brings her to the veteran security guard Ryuichi Igarashi, who instructs his partner Reiji Takimoto to help calm Miku with some candy. Takimoto then realizes that Igarashi was the same security guard who helped him when he was lost at the ballpark as a child. After seeing Miku happily reunited with her family, the normally unmotivated Takimoto decides to take his job more seriously. Afterwards, it is mentioned that no matter when or where, the ballpark will always be there to entertain people.
2	"The Definition of a Baseball Fan"; Transliteration: "Yakyū Fantaru Mono" (Japanese: 野球ファンたるもの)	Takeyuki Sadohara	Takeshi Mori	April 9, 2025
2	"No! Never!"; Transliteration: "Dame! Zettai!" (Japanese: ダメ! ゼッタイ!)	Takeyuki Sadohara	Takeshi Mori	April 9, 2025
2	"The Head Scarf of Innocence"; Transliteration: "Junjō Sankakukin" (Japanese: 純情三角巾)	Takeyuki Sadohara	Takeshi Mori	April 9, 2025
Despite her dislike of baseball, Yuki Takino arrives at the ballpark to cheer for her husband Kojiro, who plays for the Chiba MotorSuns. She gets angry at a pair of fans trash talking Kojiro's performance until he hits a home run, defusing the situation. Ruriko meanwhile tries to learn the rules of the game with little success. Ruriko listens in to her coworkers gossiping about romance and feels self-conscious she has not been hit on by the customers herself. Their managers then warn of "triple-three sleaze balls" and reminds everybody not to give away their personal information. Ruriko encounters said sleaze balls during her shift and refuses their advances, so they settle for following her Ninsta account. Ruriko admits she does not have one and has them help her make one, where she ends up going viral. Despite aspiring to be a beer vendor girl, Natsuno Yamada ended up working at the ballpark's concession stand instead. Feeling down, she develops a crush on Murata when he gives her some words of encouragement. After hearing how grateful many of the ballpark patrons are of her food, Yamada decides to keep working at the concession stand a little longer.
3	"The Goddess of Baseball?"; Transliteration: "Yakyū no Megami?" (Japanese: 野球の女神?)	Hideki Tonokatsu	Jun'ichi Kitamura	April 16, 2025
3	"The Invincible Mascot"; Transliteration: "Muteki no Masukotto" (Japanese: 無敵のマスコット)	Hideki Tonokatsu	Jun'ichi Kitamura	April 16, 2025
3	"Rah! Rah! Rah!"; Transliteration: "Eiei Ō♡" (Japanese: えいえいおー♡)	Hideki Tonokatsu	Jun'ichi Kitamura	April 16, 2025
Batter and Chicago native Dennis Young is not enthusiastic about being part of the MotorSuns, intending only to stay until he can improve his numbers so he can return to Major League Baseball in the United States. However, he sees Ruriko in the stands and instantly develops a crush on her. While this at first distracts him during the game, he is inspired enough by Ruriko's presence that he is able to make the winning play, and decides to stay in Japan for another season. The MotorSuns' mascot Sun-Shiro makes their rounds around the ballpark, helping out the players, staff, and fans whenever they are in trouble. They provide batting advice to Kojiro, joke around with Dennis in English, provide helpful advice to Yamada and Ruriko, and catch a home run for Miku. While Ruriko wonders if Sun-Shiro is actually her mother, nobody knows their true identity. Ruriko challenges herself to sell 150 cups in one game. Meanwhile, Murata is dismayed when the deadline to his project is moved up. During the game, Ruriko teases Murata like normal, but they end up encouraging each other to work hard at their respective jobs.
4	"Soul Announcer"; Transliteration: "Tamashī no Anaunsu" (Japanese: 魂のアナウンス)	Yoshitaka Koyama	Koichi Ohata	April 23, 2025
4	"Suggestion Box Incident Part 1"; Transliteration: "Go Iken-bako Jiken 'Zenpen'" (Japanese: ご意見箱事件《前編》)	Yoshitaka Koyama	Koichi Ohata	April 23, 2025
4	"Suggestion Box Incident Part 2"; Transliteration: "Go Iken-bako Jiken 'Kōhen'" (Japanese: ご意見箱事件《後編》)	Yoshitaka Koyama	Koichi Ohata	April 23, 2025
The ballpark announcer Nagisa Sato has made it a habit to tease one of the players, Ken Nokogiriyama, whenever she announces the opening lineup, which has become a ballpark tradition. However, Nagisa run out of material to tease Nokogiriyama with and panics. She asks Ruriko for advice on a whim, who suggests she simply speak from her heart. Nagisa gives it a try and ends up spilling she has a crush on Nokogiriyama, though the fans and Nokogiriyama himself take it in good stride. Ruriko discovers that an anonymous fan has submitted ten pages worth of compliments about her in one of the ballpark's suggestion boxes, which leaves her curious who could have written them. She begins scrutinizing her regular customers to get to the bottom of the mystery. Unable to figure out who it is, Ruriko is directed to talk to Takimoto, who was guarding the suggestion box. He reveals that all of Ruriko's regulars left compliments for her, which leaves her touched. Later, after buying a beer from Ruriko, Murata observes the MotorSuns pulling off a surprise win and wonders if they will be able to win their first championship this season.
5	"Ticks Me Off!"; Transliteration: "Mukatsuku!" (Japanese: むかつく!)	Akira Shimizu	Jun'ichi Kitamura	April 30, 2025
5	"The Meal Pack Capriccio"; Transliteration: "Obentō Kyōsō Kyoku" (Japanese: お弁当狂騒曲)	Akira Shimizu	Jun'ichi Kitamura	April 30, 2025
5	"Different Faces"; Transliteration: "Chigau Kao" (Japanese: 違う顔)	Akira Shimizu	Jun'ichi Kitamura	April 30, 2025
When Murata arrives at the ballpark, he is surprised to meet one of his new coworkers, Hotaru Shimizu. Seeing that Shimizu is also a baseball fan, Murata agrees to watch the game together with her. Both Ruriko and Yamada grow jealous of Murata spending time with Shimizu. After Yuki buys one of the Kojiro-themed meal packs in order to support him, she sees another woman, Kisa Kondo, buy two Reto Mitsui meal packs. It is soon revealed that Kisa is actually Mitsui's girlfriend who is also trying to support him. While Yuki and Kisa get into a rivalry, it is revealed that they have a lot in common and could become good friends. Heavy rains force the umpires to call a rain delay, which disappoints Koki Sodeguara and his daughter Megumi, though Ruriko ends up cheering them up. Shortly after, the rain miraculously stops, allowing the game to continue and the MotorSuns end up securing the victory.
6	"A Good Kid"; Transliteration: "Iiko" (Japanese: 良い子)	Taiki Nishimura	Takeshi Mori	May 7, 2025
6	"So Many Treasures"; Transliteration: "Takaramono ga Ippai" (Japanese: 宝物がいっぱい)	Taiki Nishimura	Takeshi Mori	May 7, 2025
6	"Going Off-Script"; Transliteration: "Bukku Yaburi" (Japanese: ブック破り)	Taiki Nishimura	Takeshi Mori	May 7, 2025
The ballpark's youngest beer vendor girl, Sara, encounters her family in the stands, who cannot help but pamper her. Seeing that the changing and waiting rooms are filling up with clutter, the staff decide to clean them out. During the cleaning, they find all sorts of old artifacts and keepsakes from the ballpark's past. They then find a picture of veteran beer vendor Kohinata when she first worked at the ballpark, and are shocked to see she used to dress as a gyaru when she was young. The ballpark becomes the site for the annual All-Star Game, where baseball fans from all over Japan gather. In the Home Run Derby, Dennis is defeated by Araiba, a member of the rival Fukuoka Styx. Afterward, Sun-Shiro loses a scripted fight between himself and Kaiser, the Styx's mascot. Upon hearing Ruriko's cheer for him to get up, and recalling Styx fans insulting the MotorSuns, Sun-Shiro goes off-script and fights Kaiser for real. As a result, he gives MotorSuns fans a much needed morale boost after he knocks Kaiser out. Sun-Shiro is later scolded by the staff.
7	"The Pointless 99 Times"; Transliteration: "Kyūjūkyū Kai no Muda" (Japanese: 99回のムダ)	Masayuki Iimura	Yoshitaka Koyama	May 14, 2025
7	"Bonds Forged Over Food"; Transliteration: "Onaji Kama no Meshi" (Japanese: 同じ釜の飯)	Masayuki Iimura	Yoshitaka Koyama	May 14, 2025
7	"Transform!!"; Transliteration: "Henshin!!" (Japanese: 変身っ!!)	Masayuki Iimura	Yoshitaka Koyama	May 14, 2025
Tadahiro Matsudo, the MotorSuns' manager, provides an inspirational quote to the press. Later in the waiting room, almost all the beer vendor girls think the meeting about vocal exercises is pointless. During work, Ruriko uses all the phrases in the exercises and realizes the meeting was not pointless after all, and she ends up admiring Matsudo. In the clubhouse, second baseman Wataru Ichinomiya laments his lack of success after he runs into shortstop Kazuma Shishio. While eating alone in the cafeteria, Marie Mori, the cook, is able to cheer him up by explaining that everyone has his back via the food. However, Ichinomiya becomes annoyed after Shishio inadvertently ruins the moment when the former attempts to bond with the latter. Ruriko is featured in the latest issue of Weekly Baseball, which she brags about to Murata. Ten minutes later, they have another conversation about what they did in high school before Ruriko admits that she feels like she has transformed into a different person thanks to her job. After Murata orders food at the concession stand, it is revealed Yamada is also featured in the same issue of Weekly Baseball, albeit the magazine misspelled her last name.
8	"It's the Wind's Fault"; Transliteration: "Zenbu Kaze no Seida" (Japanese: ぜんぶ風のせいだ)	Takeyuki Sadohara	Jun'ichi Kitamura	May 21, 2025
8	"Signs"; Transliteration: "Mejirushi" (Japanese: 目印)	Takeyuki Sadohara	Jun'ichi Kitamura	May 21, 2025
8	"Watch Out for Online News!"; Transliteration: "Nettonyūsu ni Goyōshin" (Japanese: ネットニュースにご用心)	Takeyuki Sadohara	Jun'ichi Kitamura	May 21, 2025
On a windy day, the wind suddenly picks up and lifts Ruriko's skirt in front of Murata. Ruriko is embarrassed that Murata might have seen her underwear, but he quickly comes up with a perfect excuse. Ruriko is then pleased that he noticed she changed her pouring style to counter the wind. Ruriko and some of her coworkers decide to go the ballpark on their day off as ordinary fans. She comes across Murata, but gets angry when he does not recognize her. Several days later, Ruriko teases Murata about not recognizing her, but gets embarrassed when he points out the easiest way for him to recognize her is the flower she wears in her hair while she is working. Aona is tasked with accompanying Iijima, a reporter who is writing an article about beer vendor girls. Unbeknownst to Aona, Iijima has been instructed by his editor to write a negative article that paints them as working under exploitative labor practices. However, seeing how happy Aona and everybody else at the ballpark are, and learning his mother reads all of his articles, Iijima decides to write a positive article instead.
9	"Tommy's Melancholy"; Transliteration: "Tomī no Yūutsu" (Japanese: トミーの憂鬱)	Hideki Tonokatsu	Takeshi Mori	May 28, 2025
9	"Mr. Murata"; Transliteration: "Murata-san" (Japanese: ムラタさん)	Hideki Tonokatsu	Takeshi Mori	May 28, 2025
9	"Show Your Sun"	Hideki Tonokatsu	Takeshi Mori	May 28, 2025
Ruriko ends up being late to work, but after she changes, she finds herself trapped in the changing room due to a baseball dog named Tommy blocking her way. While initially afraid of him, Ruriko comes to realize Tommy ran away to take a break from his job. As such, they form a special bond. Eventually, the staff find Tommy, while Ruruko is scolded. Ruriko and Murata show off their MotorSuns merchandise to each other. Later, Ruriko finds Murata's wallet on the floor but cannot find him. After the game, Murata finally catches up with Ruriko, who reveals he was searching for her to return an extra 100 yen coin she gave him. A touched Ruriko then returns Murata's wallet to him and addresses him by his last name instead of "mister". With the MotorSuns on the verge of clinching a playoff berth for the first time, morale is at an all time high. Kojiro meanwhile receives multiple calls from Yuki but cannot answer them. During the game, Ruriko notices that Yuki seems to be acting more mature than usual while Kojiro goes 5-for-5, including a home run. After the game, it is revealed that Yuki is pregnant, meaning Kojiro will be a father.
10	"Us Back Then"; Transliteration: "Anogoro no Watashitachi" (Japanese: あの頃の私たち)	Jun'ichi Kitamura	Jun'ichi Kitamura	June 4, 2025
10	"Whack That Bottom!"; Transliteration: "Oshiri o Tatake!" (Japanese: おしりをたたけ!)	Jun'ichi Kitamura	Jun'ichi Kitamura	June 4, 2025
10	"The Double-T Duo"; Transliteration: "TT Konbi" (Japanese: TTコンビ)	Jun'ichi Kitamura	Jun'ichi Kitamura	June 4, 2025
Idol-turned-actress and former beer vendor Uda Natsume attends a MotorSuns game and has an unexpected reunion with Kohinata, her former coworker. When Natsume complains to Kohinata about her situation, the latter reassures her by explaining how resilient the MotorSuns are. Seeing the fan support for the MotorSuns, Natsume decides to keep on fighting as well. Dennis asks fellow foreign player Anthony Bryan why everybody seems so much friendlier with him. Bryan explains his situation, and observes that Dennis' eye contact to his interpreter instead of the person he is talking to is the reason there is distance between himself and his teammates. During the game, Dennis' home run inadvertently hits Ruriko. He then thanks his teammates in Japanese, which causes them to accept him. He later apologizes to Ruriko, who readily and enthusiastically accepts it. Kojiro calls his old friend, Mitsuteru Tsubaki, who left the MotorSuns years ago. However, the call is interrupted before Kojiro can tell Tsubaki about his wife's pregnancy. Hearing Tsubaki's voice in the room next door, Kojiro goes to investigate and discovers that Tsubaki is actually Sun-Shiro. Sun-Shiro congratulates Kojiro and hugs him, silently acknowledging their friendship.
11	"The Clincher!"; Transliteration: "Daiichiban!" (Japanese: 大一番!)	Takaaki Ishiyama	Takeshi Mori	June 11, 2025
11	"The Clincher! (Pt. 2)"; Transliteration: "Daiichiban (Chūhen)" (Japanese: 大一番 (中編))	Takaaki Ishiyama	Takeshi Mori	June 11, 2025
11	"The Clincher! (Pt. 3)"; Transliteration: "Daiichiban (Kōhen)" (Japanese: 大一番 (後編))	Takaaki Ishiyama	Takeshi Mori	June 11, 2025
Excitement builds among both the ballpark staff and the fans as the MotorSuns have their first "clincher" game against the Fukuoka Styx to determine which team will make it to the playoffs. The MotorSuns take a 3–1 lead in the bottom of the second inning. In the top of the seventh inning, a combination of Mitsui caving to the pressure and Shishio hiding a foot injury cause them to trail 4–3. The fans soon begin turning against Mitsui, but Ruriko cheering him on convinces them to stay positive as well. While both Mitsui and Shishio are subbed out, the MotorSuns are unable to retake the lead. In the bottom of the ninth inning, the MotorSuns proceed to load the bases with two outs and Kojiro up to bat. The game ends with him lining out to Ishimura, the Styx's closer. As a result, the Styx clinch a playoff berth. Despite their defeat, MotorSuns fans collectively show solidarity for their team, leading Ruriko to love the ballpark more than she ever did before.
12	"Transformative Game"; Transliteration: "Shōka Shiai" (Japanese: 昇華試合)	Yoshitaka Koyama	Takeshi Mori	June 18, 2025
12	"Last Message"; Transliteration: "Rasuto Messēji" (Japanese: ラストメッセージ)	Yoshitaka Koyama	Takeshi Mori	June 18, 2025
12	"It's Opening Day, Okay?!"; Transliteration: "Kaimakuttara Kaimaku!" (Japanese: 開幕ったら開幕!)	Yoshitaka Koyama	Takeshi Mori	June 18, 2025
Despite failing to make the playoffs, the MotorSuns decide to still put in all their effort in the final game of the season. Meanwhile, Aona announces to the other vendor girls that she has passed her teacher's exam. During the game, Murata and Ruriko have a heartfelt conversation. Afterwards, a new vendor girl is hired to replace Aona. Matsudo announces his retirement. The MotorSuns then hold their Fan Appreciation Day. At the start of the Exhibition Match, Matsudo appears as the pinch hitter, and Nagisa reads messages written by the whole team thanking him for supporting them. As a result, everybody gives him a loving send-off. Ruriko eagerly returns to work on opening day, though she is annoyed to learn that the MotorSuns have already played three away games. She then reunites with Murata, who admits he went to their first game in Saitama, but he did not order any beer there because he wanted one from Ruriko. Meanwhile, the new vendor girl thanks Nakaizumi for hiring her. Back on the field, Murata and Ruriko watch a fireworks show together to celebrate the new season, and Ruriko resumes her work as a vendor girl.

== Reception ==
By January 2024, the series had over 200,000 copies in circulation.
