= Kenya Wakatsuki =

Japanese baseball player (born 1995)

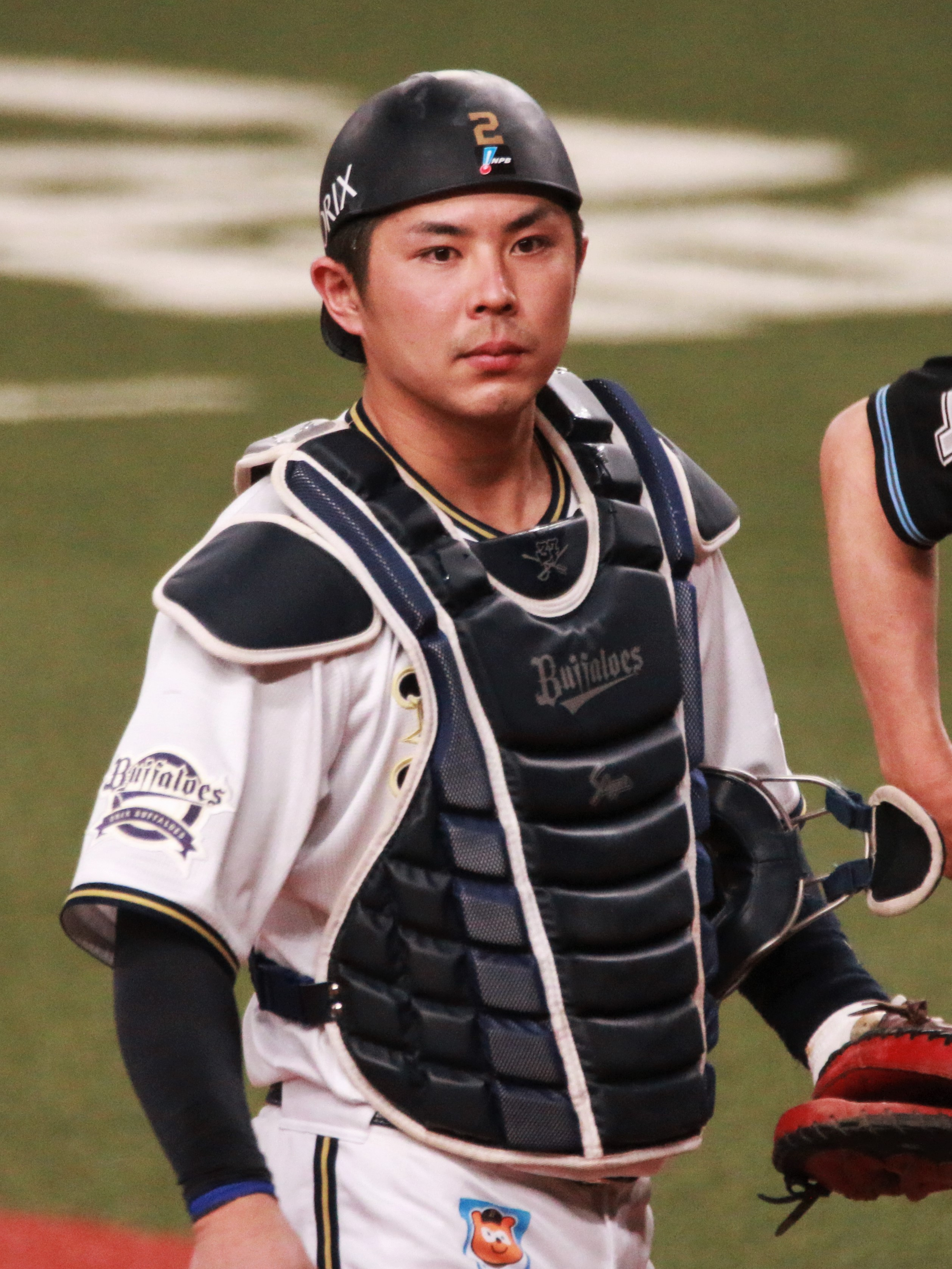
- Wakatsuki in 2021 with the Orix Buffaloes

Orix Buffaloes – No. 2
- Catcher
- Born: October 4, 1995 (age 30); Kazo, Saitama Prefecture, Japan
- Bats: Right Throws: Right

NPB debut
- May 1, 2015, for the Orix Buffaloes

NPB statistics (through 2025 season)
- Batting average: .232
- Home runs: 30
- Runs batted in: 201
- Stats at Baseball Reference

Teams
- Orix Buffaloes (2014–present)

Career highlights and awards
- 2x NPB All-Star (2023, 2025); Japan Series champion (2022); 3x Best Battery Award with Pitcher Yoshinobu Yamamoto (2021–2023)
Medals
Men's baseball
Representing Japan
18U Baseball World Cup
Silver medal – second place	2013 Taichung	Team

Kenya Wakatsuki (若月 健矢, Wakatsuki Ken'ya; born October 4, 1995) is a Japanese professional baseball catcher for the Orix Buffaloes of Nippon Professional Baseball (NPB).

== Personal life ==
He married anime voice actress Rika Tachibana on December 28, 2019.
