= Hajime Iijima =

Japanese voice actor

- Born: April 29, 1973 (age 53); Kanagawa Prefecture, Japan
- Occupation: Voice actor

Hajime Iijima (飯島肇, Iijima Hajime) (born April 29, 1973) is a male Japanese voice actor from Kanagawa Prefecture affiliated with Office Osawa. He was formerly affiliated with Office CHK.

== Voice roles ==
=== Television animation ===
2001

- Motto! Ojamajo Doremi (HR Professionals)
- Super GALS! Kotobuki Ran (Clerk (ep 28), Neighborhood Association Chairman (ep 36), Teacher (ep 50) Vice Principal (ep 34), Wakayama (ep 46))
- Fruits Basket (Principal (ep 14))

2002

- Ojamajo Doremi DOKKAAN! (Shibata's Dog)
- Happy Lesson (Kyoto)
- Rizelmine (Papa A)
- Digimon Frontier (2nd Goblimon, Physician)
- UFO Ultramaiden Valkyrie (Ajiro)
- Princess Tutu (Book Men, Judge (ep 16))
- Haibane Renmei (Gentleman)

2003

- Ashita no Nadja (Villager)
- Zatch Bell! (Donpoccho)
- Detective School Q (Mathematic Teacher)
- Texhnolyze (Man, Yono)
- Ikki Tousen (Gakushu)
- Battle Programmer Shirase (Keibin/Guard)
- UFO Ultramaiden Valkyrie 2: December Nocturne (Kendo Master)
- Peacemaker Kurogane (Masterless Samurai (eps 1, 7, 13), Soba Noodle Vendor (ep 4))

2004

- Yugo the Negotiator (Merenkofu)
- Mermaid Melody Pichi Pichi Pitch (Dr. Somegorou (ep 71), Mehikari (ep 57), The Great One)
- Gantz (Boy (ep 3), Gang Member B (ep 8), Hatanaka, Konta Man (ep 6), Yonekura)
- Tsukuyomi: Moon Phase (Chief Editor (ep 7), Ramen Shop Man (ep 6))
- Viewtiful Joe (Volcano)
- Final Approach (Nishimori's Father)
- Rockman.EXE Stream (Makita)
- Bleach (Demoura Zodd)
- Grenadier (General, Master of the Shop, Official)

2005

- Glass Mask (Keiichi Kawaguchi)
- Zoids: Genesis (Digaru Colonel)
- Eureka Seven (Director, Goalkeeper)
- Full Metal Panic! The Second Raid (Spec)
- Canvas 2: Niji Iro no Sketch (TV)
- Hell Girl (Shopkeeper (eps 5, 18))
- Blood+ (Junichiro Inanime)
- Noein: To Your Other Self (Doctor (ep 22))

2006

- Tactical Roar (Commander-in-chief (ep 9))
- Yoshinaga-san'chi no Gargoyle (Avery, Durahan)
- BakéGyamon (Corner)
- Princess Princess (Man)
- Witchblade (Captain)
- xxxHOLiC (Spirit (ep 3))
- Project Blue Earth SOS (Robert)
- Lovedol ~Lovely Idol~ (Sound Director)
- Shōnen Onmyōji (Hozumi no Moronao)
- Living for the Day After Tomorrow (Karada's father)
- Kujibiki Unbalance (Employee)
- Strain: Strategic Armored Infantry (Jake)

2007

- Les Misérables: Shōjo Cosette (Staff of Government Buildings, Man Caught)
- Getsumento Heiki Mina (Abudauto Alien)
- Ikki Tousen: Dragon Destiny (Bunsoku Ukin)
- Moribito: Guardian of the Spirit (Gambling stall holder (ep 10), Merchant (ep 10))
- Bokurano (Sakuma)

2008

- Porphy no Nagai Tabi (Guard)
- Yatterman (Jouji's Grandfather (ep 23))
- Blassreiter (Police Chief)
- Ikki Tousen: Great Guardians (Gakushu)
- Strike Witches (Medic (ep 2))
- Yakushiji Ryōko no Kaiki Jikenbo (Ryojun Tadomura)
- Live on Cardliver Kakeru (Q・B)
- Ga-Rei: Zero (Commander (ep 1))

2009

- Michiko & Hatchin (Chief (ep 19))
- Chrome Shelled Regios (Gorneo Luckens)
- Sora o Miageru Shōjo no Hitomi ni Utsuru Sekai (Principal)
- Phantom: Requiem for the Phantom (Enho Ko)
- Shangri-La (Minister Kato)
- Tegami Bachi: Letter Bee (Kobyirofu)
- InuYasha: The Final Act (Ryūjin)

2010

- Dance in the Vampire Bund (Politician)
- Ikki Tousen: Xtreme Xecutor (Gakushu)
- Heroman (Cop)
- The Legend of the Legendary Heroes (Tyle)
- Zakuro (A-sama (eps 10, 12))

2011

- Yu-Gi-Oh! Zexal (Nosferatu Nakajima)
- Blue Exorcist (Bourguignon)
- Manyū Hiken-chō (Valley in the Front)
- Last Exile: Fam, The Silver Wing (Ernest Cirrus Lindemann)

2012

- Queen's Blade Rebellion (Clan Leader (ep 1))
- Blast of Tempest (Platoon Leader)
- Code:Breaker (Hosa-kan)
- Psycho-Pass (Young Man (ep 12))

2013

- Hakkenden: Eight Dogs of the East (Akihiko's father)
- Silver Spoon (Hirono Sensei)

2014

- Yu-Gi-Oh! Arc-V (Nico Smiley)

2015

- Marvel Disk Wars: The Avengers (Bi-Beast)

2023

- Junji Ito Maniac: Japanese Tales of the Macabre (Shigorō)

2024

- That Time I Got Reincarnated as a Slime (Bacchus)

2025

- Detectives These Days Are Crazy! (Coach)

=== Video games ===
- Ace Combat: Assault Horizon (Jose 'Guts' Gutierrez)
- Crash Nitro Kart (Dingodile)
- Crash Twinsanity (Dingodile, Rusty Walrus)
- Killer Is Dead (Giant Head)
- Lollipop Chainsaw (Josey)
- Secret of Evangelion (Potter)
- Sly Cooper (The Murray)

=== Drama CDs ===
- Aka no Shinmon (Ikebe)

=== Tokusatsu ===
2009

- Kamen Rider W (News, T-Rex Dopant (ep 1 - 2))
- Tomica Hero Rescue Fire (Fire Phoenix AI, X-Dragon AI)

2012

- Tokumei Sentai Go-Buster (Cutterloid (ep 4))

2013

- Zyuden Sentai Kyoryuger (Debo Zaihon (ep 16), Debo Zaihodoron (ep 30))

2017

- Uchu Sentai Kyuranger (Olmega (ep 19))
- Ultraman Geed (Satan Zorg (ep 1))

=== Dubbing roles ===
- Bad Lieutenant: Port of Call New Orleans (Donald "Big Fate" Godshaw (Xzibit))
- Blue Thunder (Colonel F. E. Cochrane (Malcolm McDowell))
- Bohemian Rhapsody (John Deacon (Joseph Mazzello))
- Cymbeline (Pisanio (John Leguizamo))
- Dagon (Howard (Brendan Price))
- Deadwater Fell (DCI Spencer Collins (Gordon Brown))
- Don't Worry Darling (Dean (Nick Kroll))
- Fast Five (Chato (Yorgo Constantine))
- Final Destination 2 (Deputy Steve (Aaron Douglas))
- Good People (Khan (Omar Sy))
- M3GAN (Cole (Brian Jordan Alvarez))
- Mad Max: Fury Road (The Organic Mechanic (Angus Sampson))
- Furiosa: A Mad Max Saga (The Organic Mechanic (Angus Sampson))
- Once Upon a Time in Mexico (Fideo (Marco Leonardi))
- Power Rangers Lightspeed Rescue (Gatekeeper)
- Snatch (2017 Blu-Ray edition) (Sol (Lennie James))
- White Oleander (Teacher (Sam Catlin))
