= Liar, Liar (novel series) =

Japanese light novel series

- First light novel volume cover

ライアー・ライアー (Raiā Raiā)
- Genre: Romantic comedy
- Light novel
- Written by: Haruki Kuō
- Illustrated by: konomi
- Published by: Media Factory
- English publisher: NA: Yen Press
- Imprint: MF Bunko J
- Original run: April 25, 2019 – November 25, 2023
- Volumes: 15 (Note: + 1 short stories collection)
- Manga
- Written by: Haruki Kuō
- Illustrated by: Funa Yukina
- Published by: Media Factory
- English publisher: NA: Yen Press
- Magazine: Monthly Comic Alive
- Original run: August 27, 2019 – July 27, 2026
- Volumes: 5
- Anime television series
- Directed by: Satoru Ono; Naoki Matsuura
- Written by: Momoka Toyoda
- Music by: Kuniyuki Takahashi; Keiichi Hirokawa
- Studio: Geek Toys
- Licensed by: Crunchyroll; SA/SEA: Medialink
- Original network: Tokyo MX, SUN, BS Asahi, AT-X, TVh
- Original run: July 8, 2023 – September 23, 2023
- Episodes: 12

Liar, Liar (ライアー・ライアー, Raiā Raiā) is a Japanese romantic comedy light novel series written by Haruki Kuō and illustrated by konomi. Media Factory has published fifteen volumes from April 2019 to November 2023 under their MF Bunko J imprint. A manga adaptation with art by Funa Yukina was serialized in Media Factory's seinen manga magazine Monthly Comic Alive from August 2019 to July 2026. An anime television series adaptation by Geek Toys aired from July to September 2023.

== Plot ==
At Academy Island, everything is settled through "Games" waged for a certain number of stars, with the strongest student being granted the ranking of Seven Stars. Hiroto Shinohara, a transfer student, unexpectedly beats the strongest empress, Sarasa Saionji, and becomes the pseudo-strongest in the school, letting to the shocking discovery of the true identity of Sarasa. As the mind game of lies and bluffs begins, also lies a darker past that has been awaiting both Hiroto and the fake Sarasa.

== Characters ==
Hiroto Shinohara (篠原 緋呂斗, Shinohara Hiroto)
Voiced by: Genta Nakamura (Japanese); Blake McNamara (English)
The protagonist, he gained a seven-star ranking after cheating and defeating Sarasa.
Shirayuki Himeji (姫路 白雪, Himeji Shirayuki)
Voiced by: Yukina Shuto (Japanese); Meg McClain (English)
She works as Hiroto's maid and is childhood friends with Sarasa. She is not used to being around with men.
Sarasa Saionji (彩園寺 更紗, Saionji Sarasa) / Rina Akabane (赤羽 里奈, Akabane Rina)
Voiced by: Wakana Kuramochi (Japanese); Taylor Murphy (English)
She was previously known as the most powerful student in Academy Island and a seven-star, but after she lost a duel to Hiroto, she loses a star. She is currently living as Sarasa as the real Sarasa was kidnapped and is missing. She seems to have known Hiroto when they were children.
Noa Akizuki (秋月 乃愛, Akizuki Noa)
Voiced by: Rika Tachibana (Japanese); Alexis Tipton (English)
Tsumugi Shiina (椎名 紬, Shiina Tsumugi)
Voiced by: Yurika Moriyama
Natsume Ichinose (一ノ瀬 棗, Ichinose Natsume)
Voiced by: Houko Kuwashima (Japanese); Monica Piskor (English)
Ami Kagaya (加賀谷 亜未, Kagaya Ami)
Voiced by: Hibiku Yamamura
Fūka Tatara (多々良 楓花, Tatara Fūka)
Voiced by: Momoko Seto
Yūki Tsuji (辻 友紀, Tsuji Yūki)
Voiced by: Mai Mochizuki
Seiran Kugasaki (久我崎 晴嵐, Kugasaki Seiran)
Voiced by: Jun Fukuyama
Suzuran Kazami (風見 鈴蘭, Kazami Suzuran)
Voiced by: Sora Tokui
Shinji Enomoto (榎本 進司, Enomoto Shinji)
Voiced by: Junya Enoki
The student council president and a six-star. He has a very strong memory.
Nanase Asamiya (浅宮 七瀬, Asamiya Nanase)
Voiced by: Saori Ōnishi
A third-year student and a six-star. She is childhood friends with Shinji.

== Media ==
=== Light novel ===
The series is written by Haruki Kuō and illustrated by konomi. Media Factory published the series in fifteen volumes from April 2019 to November 2023 under their MF Bunko J imprint. The light novel is licensed by Yen Press for English publication.

No.	Title	Original release date	English release date
1	Apparently, the Lying Transfer Student Dominates Games by Cheating	April 25, 2019; 978-4-04-065631-1	September 5, 2023; 978-1-9753-7059-6
2	The Lying Transfer Student Is Targeted by the Little Devil	August 24, 2019; 978-4-04-065798-1	November 21, 2023; 978-1-9753-7061-9
3	The Lying Transfer Student Hunts for the Impostor Rich Guys	February 25, 2020; 978-4-04-064447-9	February 20, 2024; 978-1-9753-7063-3
4	The Lying Transfer Student Is Bossed Around by the Delusional Middle School Genius	March 25, 2020; 978-4-04-064549-0	June 18, 2024; 978-1-9753-7065-7
5	The Lying Transfer Student Is Tested by His Childhood Friend	July 20, 2020; 978-4-04-064810-1	November 19, 2024; 978-1-9753-7067-1
6	The Lying Transfer Student Is Accused by Defenders of Justice	November 25, 2020; 978-4-04-680015-2	July 15, 2025; 978-1-9753-7069-5
7	The Lying Transfer Student Strikes Back Against False Justice	March 25, 2021; 978-4-04-680329-0	March 10, 2026; 978-1-9753-7071-8
8	The Lying Transfer Student Is Envied by a Totally Normal High School Girl	July 21, 2021; 978-4-04-680610-9	July 14, 2026; 978-1-9753-7073-2
9	The Lying Transfer Student Races to Help His Unreliable Seniors in Danger	November 25, 2021; 978-4-04-680913-1	February 9, 2027; 978-1-9753-7075-6
10	–	March 25, 2022; 978-4-04-681293-3	—
11	–	July 25, 2022; 978-4-04-681582-8	—
12	–	November 25, 2022; 978-4-04-681939-0	—
13	–	March 25, 2023; 978-4-04-682333-5	—
14	–	July 25, 2023; 978-4-04-682663-3	—
SS	–	September 25, 2023; 978-4-04-682868-2	—
15	–	November 25, 2023; 978-4-04-683076-0	—

=== Manga ===
A manga adaptation with art by Funa Yukina was serialized in Media Factory's seinen manga magazine Monthly Comic Alive from August 27, 2019 to July 27, 2026. It has been collected in five tankōbon volumes. During their panel at Anime NYC in 2024, Yen Press announced that they also licensed the manga adaptation for English publication.

No.	Original release date	Original ISBN	English release date	English ISBN
1	April 23, 2020	978-4-04-064507-0	February 18, 2025	979-8-8554-0319-0
2	November 21, 2020	978-4-04-064894-1	May 27, 2025	979-8-8554-0321-3
3	July 22, 2023	978-4-04-682836-1	October 28, 2025	979-8-8554-0323-7
4	August 22, 2023	978-4-04-682884-2	July 28, 2026	979-8-8554-0325-1
5	November 19, 2026	978-4-04-660931-1	—	—

=== Anime ===
An anime adaptation was announced on April 1, 2021, which is April Fool's Day. It was later revealed to be a television series produced by Geek Toys and directed by Satoru Ono and Naoki Matsuura, with scripts written by Momoka Toyoda, character designs handled by Yumi Nakamura, and music composed by Kuniyuki Takahashi and Keiichi Hirokawa from Monaca. The series aired from July 8 to September 23, 2023, on Tokyo MX and other networks. The opening theme song is "Lies Goes On" by May'n, while the ending theme song is "Fakey Merry Game" by Smile Princess. Crunchyroll streamed the series. Medialink licensed the series in Taiwan, South and Southeast Asia; will stream it on Ani-One Asia's YouTube channel via their ULTRA subscription service.

No.	Title (Note: All English titles are taken from Crunchyroll.)	Directed by (Note: Information is taken from the ending credits of each episode.)	Written by	Storyboarded by	Original release date
1	"The King and the Lie"; Transliteration: "Ō to Uso" (Japanese: 王と嘘)	Jirō Arimoto	Momoka Toyoda	Naoki Matsuura, Satoru Ono	July 8, 2023
Hiroto transfers to Eimei Academy, overseen by the Saionji Corporation who provides all the technology in the student's phones. Students compete in games to determine their rankings, the highest and rarest being seven stars. Hiroto encounters Sarasa from Ouka academy just as a grass sprinkler soaks her clothing, so she blames him for trying to embarrass her and challenges him to a staring contest enforced by facial recognition cameras. When the sprinkler soaks her again she is embarrassed he can see her bra, and the cameras declare her the loser, giving Hiroto one of her stars. Hiroto is summoned by Principal Natsume who informs him Sarasa is one of the few seven star students and granddaughter to Saionji Corporations CEO Masamune. As a commoner his life is now at risk for the insult to the Saionji's, but luckily the star he won was one of fifteen coloured stars; the Red star that allows him to pass off any lie as the truth, so for his own protection he fakes being a seven star, as this is less insulting to the Saionji's. Sarasa desperately confronts him, revealing she is actually Akabane, Sarasa's decoy who was entrusted with the Red star so people would believe she is Sarasa. She begs him not to expose this. She is shocked when Hiroto reveals he is a fake seven star and the sprinkler was a genuine accident, meaning losing the Red star was entirely her own fault for overreacting.
2	"Loyalty and Performance"; Transliteration: "Chūgi to Engi" (Japanese: 忠義と演技)	Kazuhiro Takeuchi, Kim Myoung-geun	Sarumaru Yuge	Kazuhiro Takeuchi	July 15, 2023 (Note: From Episode 2, are released on select platforms (such as ABEMA and Crunchyroll) a week before their air dates on television.)
Hiroto learns as a seven star he gets a mansion and an assistant, Himeji. Himeji reveals there are twenty academies ranked on number of student stars once a year. As a seven star Hiroto has increased Eimei's rank, but it makes him a target and as a secret one star he will obviously lose to his first challenger. Therefore Himeji's main role is to help Hiroto win by cheating with support from Kagaya, a computer hacker. On Himeji's recommendation he accepts a challenge from Urasaka to a 100 meter sprint utilizing any method and sabotage of the opponent. Urasaka chooses her motorcycle upgraded for speed and sabotage nullification. With Kagaya's hacking the bike shuts down and Hiroto wins by walking to the finish line. Akabane privately reveals to him Sarasa was kidnapped a year ago and she was asked to pose as Sarasa to maintain appearances. This means Sarasa's survival could depend on Akabane not being exposed, which now depends on Hiroto remaining a seven star. Hiroto also reveals he can't afford to be expelled as he is searching for his missing childhood friend he believes is a student. They agree to work together in secret, so they exchange phone numbers. At school they are both confronted by a creepy student.
3	"A Dead Heat and Determination"; Transliteration: "Gokaku to Kakugo" (Japanese: 互角と覚悟)	Naoki Miyazaki, Kim Yu-cheon, Kim Myoung-geun	Chika Suzumura	Hatsuki Tsuji	July 22, 2023
The student, Seiran, one of Akabane's stalkers, challenges Hiroto to a game. Akabane has a strategy meeting with Hiroto and Yuki who is an old friend of Akabane and aware she is pretending to be Sarasa. Seiran is a legitimate 5 star and his game involves collecting cards from around the district then competing in a 5 round card draw. Unfortunately his ability Emergency Mobilisation allows him to summon 300 fellow stalkers to help him and they collect 16 cards very quickly. Urasaka decides to help Hiroto and with her bikes speed collects 2 cards but Hiroto is injured. When he tries to keep playing Akabane reveals her secret. Sarasa wasn't kidnapped, she wanted a normal high school life so Akabane smuggled her to the mainland under an alias. Sarasa plans to return after graduation. Hiroto is impressed Akabane so easily fooled the Saionji's and hints Akabane might be his ideal woman. Hiroto realizes as a fake 7 star he can technically use an ability, Rule Breaker, to change one rule mid-game. He thus tricks Seiran into thinking he used Rule Breaker when in fact he used Fake Screen to manipulate Seiran's phone. Seiran mistakenly discards all his cards, leaving Hiroto with a single card, winning the game. Akabane attempts to ask Hiroto what he meant by "ideal woman", but decides against it.
4	"Chocolate and the Devil"; Transliteration: "Choko to Akuma" (Japanese: チョコと悪魔)	Akira Katō, Kim Myoung-geun	Momoka Toyoda	Takashi Iida	July 29, 2023
Principal Natume informs Himeji that Hiroto is now a real two star, having won a star from Seiran, but it is another of the 15 coloured stars; Akabane's was Red, Seiren's is Indigo. Natsume wants Hiroto to win seven coloured stars, making him the first "All Colour Seven Star". Himeji transfers to Hiroto's class, just in time for the Trial Games, where any student can challenge anyone without risking losing stars. The top five winners will then compete in the Inter-Academy competition. Classmate Akizuki approaches Hiroto but Himeji warns him to be cautious as Akizuki is a six star nicknamed Little Devil. Natsume warns Hiroto other academies are infiltrating to challenge him, plus the Green star held by Eimei Academy was stolen and will likely be used to challenge him since it increases intelligence. With Kagaya's assistance Hiroto avoids pointless challengers, increasing his chances of being a top five participant. For unknown reasons Akizuki tries to frame Hiroto as a molester, but he is saved by quickly accepting a game challenge from Himeji. Himeji plans to lose on purpose but she is kidnapped by Akizuki to prevent them playing, and unless Himeji and Hiroto complete their game challenge within 24 hours they will both lose by default, costing Hiroto his place among the top five.
5	"A Fighting Chance in Eyes of Blue"; Transliteration: "Kachime to Aoi Me" (Japanese: 勝ち目と蒼い目)	Kim Eunbyeong, Kazuhiro Takeuchi	Sarumaru Yuge	Kazuhiro Takeuchi	August 5, 2023
As Akizuki now controls Himeji Hiroto must play their game for real, a game in which players have 10 cards of various values with attached skills. Whoever plays a higher value card keeps both cards, so whoever has the most cards after 10 rounds wins. Kagaya and Akabane develop a cheating strategy. Akabane also gives him a unique skill, Pinch Hitter, for emergencies. The next day Hiroto and Himeji begin playing. Himeji takes an early lead but Hiroto notices she is telling him to lose. Akizuki is confused when Hiroto loses all 10 rounds on purpose and Himeji wins all the cards, until it is revealed the final card Hiroto played had the skill Trojan Horse, which steals back half Himeji's total cards, ending the game in a draw. As draws do not count as losses Hiroto keeps his top five position. It is revealed Akizuki had placed a virus on Himeji's phone that would transfer to Hiroto's phone if he won and expose him as a fake, so a draw was the only way to protect him. Akizuki is furious as she had hoped to expose Hiroto's cheating as revenge for becoming more popular than her. Akizuki accidentally reveals she has a dangerous employer, so she reveals the virus can also delete all Himeji's data, which would force Himeji to be expelled, unless Hiroto accepts Akizuki's challenge and gives her his stars by losing on purpose.
6	"Treasures in the Darkness"; Transliteration: "Takara to Yami" (Japanese: 宝と闇)	Akio Hosoya	Chika Suzumura	Naoki Matsuura	August 12, 2023
The game is Treasure Hunt in which Hiroto and Akizuki must locate the others treasure, Himeji and Akabane, somewhere in the building within ten turns. Akabane manages to hack and locate Himeji for Hiroto so Akizuki uses one of her turns to move Himeji to another location before Hiroto can get there. Hiroto suspects Akizuki is using the stolen Green star with its ability Predict Movement. Hiroto comes up with a way to win and deliberately ensures the game lasts until 10 pm. At exactly 10 Akabane figures out Himeji's location, Hiroto having secretly told Himeji to turn on the air-conditioning at 10, revealing herself. Hiroto retrieves Himeji and wins the game but Akizuki uses her ability Alter Fate to delete the record of Hiroto's winning move. She then locates Akabane and wins, until Akabane reveals the unique ability Pinch Hitter she gave Hiroto allows two players to switch places, so Akizuki had actually been playing against Himeji the entire game, making it Himeji's loss and not Hiroto's. This also transfers the virus from Himeji's phone to Akizuki's, deleting all her data and dooming her to be expelled. With nothing left to lose Akizuki apologises for everything and reveals her dangerous employer is Kurahashi Mikado, headmaster of Seijo Academy. Hiroto decides to avenge Akizuki by defeating Mikado.
7	"Silence and Change"; Transliteration: "Sei to Kai" (Japanese: 静と改)	Noriyoshi Sasaki, Toshitaka Saitō, Kim Myoung-geun	Chika Suzumura	Takashi Iida	August 19, 2023
8	"Good Night"; Transliteration: "Guddo Naito" (Japanese: グッドナイト)	Yasuyuki Fuse	Momoka Toyoda	Hatsuki Tsuji	August 26, 2023
9	"Facing Off and Flushing Out"; Transliteration: "Tōsō to Sōtō" (Japanese: 闘争と掃討)	Akira Katō	Sarumaru Yuge	Toshifumi Kawase	September 2, 2023
10	"Heroes and Tricks"; Transliteration: "Hīrō to Torikku" (Japanese: ヒーローとトリック)	Kazuhiro Takeuchi, Itsumi Yukino	Sarumaru Yuge	Jet Inoue	September 9, 2023
11	"Soldiers and Friends"; Transliteration: "Hei to Tomo" (Japanese: 兵と友)	Noriyoshi Sasaki	Chika Suzumura	Hiroyuki Yamada	September 16, 2023
12	"Together with You"; Transliteration: "Zutto Minna to" (Japanese: ずっとみんなと)	Noriyoshi Sasaki	Chika Suzumura	Hatsuki Tsuji	September 23, 2023
