= Idol Death Game TV =

2016 video game

- Cover art
- Developer: Witchcraft
- Publisher: D3 Publisher
- Director: Shoujiro Endo
- Producer: Yujiro Usuda
- Designer: Metawo Ueda
- Writer: Shoujiro Endo
- Platform: PlayStation Vita
- Release: JP: October 20, 2016
- Genre: Action-adventure
- Mode: Single-player

Idol Death Game TV (Japanese: アイドルデスゲームTV, Hepburn: Aidoru Desu Gēmu TV) is an action-adventure video game developed by Witchcraft and published by D3 Publisher for the PlayStation Vita with PlayStation TV support, released on October 20, 2016, in Japan. The game follows the starlets of the top idol group "Project 47" as they partake in an event titled "Dream of Dream" to become the center of the group. Those who fail in the competition are killed.

== Premise ==
The game centers on a television reality show titled "Dream of Dream", set within a desolate old mansion named the "House of Seven Moons", where the center is set to be chosen from the members of popular idol group "Project 47". According to the game, "Project 47" is named after the 47 prefectures of Japan, and within the game's world is the largest and popular idol group in the country; the "Dream of Dream" contest is broadcast throughout Japan.

The "Dream of Dream" show is run once a year, with the game's premise being the tenth iteration. However, it is a lot different from usual, as lower-ranked idols are also included and no script was given; thus, the selection standards and how the winner is chosen remains unknown. Within "Project 47" are seven different teams, such as "Team Happy" (representing Kanto), "Team Smile" (representing Kansai), "Team Passion" (representing Kyushu) and "Team Rising" (representing Hokkaido and Tohoku); amounting in total to over 200 contestants, sorted by rank.

Central characters include:

- Mariko Kamata (voiced by Azumi Asakura), a veteran idol with 10 years of experience, having taken part in the first graduating class. She is a member of Team Happy, and is currently ranked 88th. Due to her slump, she had decided to participate in "Dream of Dream" to help Team Happy win this year's contest. However, she would also learn of a conspiracy by the show's host to manipulate the show.
- Chiharu Chigasaki (voiced by Emi Uema), an orthodox rookie idol who puts in great effort. She is a member of Team Happy, and is currently ranked 5th. In reality, her real name is Sakura Honjo, the sole heiress of Honjo family who was kidnapped by Koji Chigasaki, a former employee of the Honjo family who had hoped to ransom her off, but her parents were killed in a hit-and-run incident on the way to the ransom. Guilt-ridden, Koji, who already has a daughter named Nozomi, would raise Sakura as Chiharu Chigasaki to atone, while never revealing the details of her biological parents' demise.
- Shirase Tsukuba (voiced by Yurika Kubo), a young sister-type idol who adores Mariko and Chiharu. She is a member of Team Happy, and is currently ranked 15th. In reality, her real name is Fujimi Shirahama, an orphan who joined Team Smile last year before she was bullied out of the unit. She later returned under her current name and joined Team Happy by lying at the auditions. This way, she is hoping to have her revenge on someone from Team Smile.
- Ayaka Tennouji (voiced by Yu Serizawa), an idol with a strong sense of justice. She is the leader of Team Smile, and is currently ranked 6th. Once an ugly girl, Ayaka worked hard to make herself look attractive, but was unable to get past her lack of confidence. She is usually accompanied by Rito Karasuma, a fellow member of Team Smile who adores her and used her illicit skills to discredit and ruin the career of aspiring talent Fujimi Shirahama.
- Rito Karasuma (voiced by Asuka Nishi), a talented idol who adores Ayaka. She is a member of Team Smile, and is currently ranked 43rd. As a result of her devotion to Ayaka, she would work with a fan to ruin Fujimi Shirahama's career in Team Happy, causing Fujimi to quit and change her name, only to return sometime later under that name.
- Ren Isahaya (voiced by Mao Ichimichi), a beautiful girl with an androgynous appearance. She has won the last three consecutive "Dream of Dream" contests, but always boycotts her center inauguration. She is a member of Team Passion, and is currently ranked 2nd. In reality, she was born to Akiko Kuji, a famous singer who had a hit single that ran for 20 consecutive weeks. Unfortunately, Akiko died from the grueling working conditions. Ren had since sworn to herself that she would avenge her mother's death.
- Hime Asahikawa (voiced by Rika Tachibana), a "Super Rookie" idol with large amounts of ambition, aspiration, and talent. She is a member of Team Rising, and is currently ranked 1st. In reality, she is a greedy heiress who abuses her social status to get to the top, and is said to have had multiple relationship scandals that she had her company cover up for her, among her affairs including a co-star.
- Doripaku (voiced by Kappei Yamaguchi), a pink-costumed character with an appearance of a tapir who takes part in "Dream of Dream" as the program's host. He is a "mysterious" character who claims he came "to make the world much more interesting", and enjoys "manipulating people's emotions and lives".

== Gameplay ==
Gameplay showing exploration

The player plays as one idol appearing in the "Dream of Dream" event, experiencing the game from that character's point of view. Depending on the character they choose, Idol Death Game TV's plotline changes accordingly. The game features exploration, judging, and "Death Concert" elements. During exploration, players search for items throughout each stage and share information with other idols, raising their own spirits while lowering those of their opponents. During the judging parts, the player and other idols are judged based upon their dancing and performance, with the last-placed idol heading to the "Death Concert". During "Death Concert", idols who again fail are killed. However, by clearing the trials of Doripaku, defeated characters can be revived. The player's own actions change which characters survive. Thus, they can replay the game multiple times with different characters.

"Dream Coins" serves as the in-game currency of Idol Death Game TV and are required to win a "Death Concert" as well as to receive judgement for each stage. They can also be used to purchase items which helps the player evade elimination. "Dream Coins" are obtained by searching the mansions and talking to other idols. After a certain amount of time, players also receive "Dream Coins" based on the number of fans they have. Plays can also steal "Dream Coins" from their competitors by participating in "Baku Royale"s, a one-on-one battle with another idol where the player aims to combine "Bakuro Words" (Exposure Words) and hit their opponent with a scandal which may put an end to their opponent's idol career. Doripaku judges who wins and hurls bombs at the loser.

The objective of Idol Death Game TV is to be the last idol standing, winning the judging of each stage whilst entertaining the audience, thus allowing them to become the central idol of "Project 47". Each character has a genre that they excel in when it comes to singing and dancing. The game is lost when the player loses a "Death Concert".

== Development ==
A countdown teaser website and Twitter account by D3 Publisher for a "new idol project" was launched in late June to promote the game, which itself was officially announced on July 3. The game's official website was launched on July 17, and additional details were released in the July 24 issue of Weekly Famitsu. The debut trailer was released on August 15. Developed by Witchcraft and published by D3 Publisher, Idol Death Game TV is primarily for the PlayStation Vita but also has PlayStation TV support. The game features character design by Metawo Ueda, scripting and supervision by Shoujiro Endo, and is produced by Yujiro Usuda. The game was released on October 20, 2016, in Japan.

A special version of the game titled the Idol Death Game TV Special Pack also includes a music CD containing each idol's character song, a tapestry, a custom PlayStation Vita theme plus a download code for in-game character voices.

== Reception ==
Four Famitsu reviewers awarded Idol Death Game TV scores of 7, 7, 8 and 7, for a final score of 29/40. The game sold 5,822 copies on its first week, placing ninth for all game sales for that week. It also placed sixth for all new games debuting that week, behind Battlefield 1, Mario Party: Star Rush, Macross Delta Scramble, Reco Love: Blue Ocean and Gold Beach and NBA 2K17. Siliconera referred to the game as "pretty much The Idolmaster meets Danganronpa." Chris Carter of Destructoid opined that Idol Death Game TV is "not something you typically see in an ocean of shooters and 'immersive' open world games, and that's part of why I love it."
