= Surprise (web series) =

- Genre: Internet Television Series
- Directed by: Jiaoshou (Show Joy)
- Starring: White. K Jiaoshou (Show Joy); Kong Lianshun; Liu Xunzimo; Zhang Benyu; Ge Bu
- Country of origin: China
- Original language: Chinese
- No. of episodes: 15

Production
- Producer: Lu Fanxi
- Production location: China
- Editor: Zhi Zunyu
- Running time: 5 minutes per episode
- Production company: Unimedia.

Original release
- Network: Youku
- Release: 6 August 2013

Surprise (Chinese: 万万没想到; pinyin: Wàn Wàn Méi Xiǎngdào; lit. 'Never Imagined') is a 2013–2015 Chinese web series directed by Jiaoshou. It was first released on August 6, 2013 on Youku. The show ran for 3 seasons.

In 2015, Jiaoshou directed a major motion picture based on this show, also titled Surprise.

== Synopsis ==
Surprise tells an inconceivable story of Wang Dachui (White. K), a young loser, in an exaggerated and humorous way. As a famous loser in career, medical science, and engagement, his daily life is colorful and unpredictable. The story is combined with funny elements, transcending time and career life. Ranging from the current hot topics to the classic stories in history are included in the plot.

== Cast ==
- White. K as Wang Dachui, the main protagonist of the movie.
- Jiaoshou as the Tang Sanzang
- Kong Lianshun as the Beauty
- Liu Xunzimo as Sun Wukong, the Monkey King
- Zhang Benyu as Liu Bei
- Ge Bu as Xiao Mei

== Music ==
Type	Title	Lyricist	Composer	Singer
Theme	Surprise	Alwayswet	Jiaoshou (Show Joy);Zhou Tianran	White. K;Jiaoshou (Show Joy)
Open Theme	Still Surprise	Alwayswet	Jiaoshou (Show Joy);Zhou Tianran	White. K
End Theme	Be Cherry Tree(Special Version)	Jiaoshou (Show Joy)	YoKo Kensuke	SNH48

== Reception ==
=== Award ===
Time	Name	Notes
2014	KingBonn Award for Best Internet Short Film	China International New Media Short Film Festival (CSFF)
2014	1st Hengdian Film and TV Festival of China	Online Popularity Award
2014	6th China TV Drama Awards	Best Web Series
2016	1st Golden Guduo Media Awards	Weibo Fans' Choice Popularity Award
2016	1st Asia New Media Film Festival	Best Director (Show Joy)
2016	1st Asia New Media Film Festival	Best Actor - Web series (White.K)
