= Am I Actually the Strongest? =

Japanese light novel series

- Cover of the first light novel volume

実は俺、最強でした? (Jitsu wa Ore, Saikyō deshita?)
- Genre: Isekai
- Novel series
- Written by: Sai Sumimori
- Published by: Shōsetsuka ni Narō
- Original run: September 1, 2018 – present
- Light novel
- Written by: Sai Sumimori
- Illustrated by: Ai Takahashi
- Published by: Kodansha
- English publisher: NA: Kodansha USA
- Imprint: Kodansha Ranobe Books
- Original run: May 31, 2019 – present
- Volumes: 8
- Manga
- Written by: Sai Sumimori
- Illustrated by: Ai Takahashi
- Published by: Kodansha
- English publisher: NA: Kodansha USA
- Magazine: Suiyōbi no Sirius
- Original run: April 3, 2019 – present
- Volumes: 21
- Anime television series
- Directed by: Takashi Naoya
- Written by: Tatsuya Takahashi; Tetsuya Yamada
- Music by: Yukari Hashimoto
- Studio: Staple Entertainment
- Licensed by: Crunchyroll (streaming); SEA: Medialink
- Original network: ANN (ABC TV, TV Asahi)
- Original run: July 2, 2023 – October 1, 2023
- Episodes: 12

Am I Actually the Strongest? (Japanese: 実は俺、最強でした?, Hepburn: Jitsu wa Ore, Saikyō deshita?) is a Japanese light novel series written by Sai Sumimori. Originally published via the novel posting website Shōsetsuka ni Narō in September 2018, the series was later acquired by Kodansha, who began publishing the series in print with illustrations by Ai Takahashi. As of February 2026, eight volumes have been released. A manga adaptation, also illustrated by Takahashi, began serialization on the Niconico-based web manga platform Suiyōbi no Sirius in April 2019. As of September 2026, the series' individual chapters have been collected into twenty-one volumes. An anime television series adaptation by Staple Entertainment aired from July to October 2023.

== Plot ==
Haruto "Hart" Zenfis is a NEET wanting to avoid bullying and the spotlight. That is until he is summoned by a goddess and reincarnated into a world where magic rules all over. The goddess grants him a cheat power that is off the charts, and is reborn into a royal family just so he can live peacefully. But things take an unexpected turn. His magic power was measured and deemed as powerless due to a faulty assessment method right after birth. The misunderstanding of the royal parents regard the newborn prince as a disgrace. They claim that he was stillborn and abandoned him in a forest. He uses a wide variety of magic barriers to survive in the wild. A beautiful female Fenrir named Flay discovers Haruto, and respecting his excessive power, she offers her loyalty and services to him. Gold Zenfis (a distant relative of Hart's) approaches him and Flay to be brought into his family. Growing up, Hart lives a rather awkward life and just wants to chill out, as he navigates demon friendships, royal feuds, assassination plots, secret superhero identities, and having a little sister.

== Characters ==
Haruto Zenfis (ハルト・ゼンフィス, Haruto Zenfisu)
Voiced by: Ayumu Murase (Japanese); Kevin D. Thelwell (English)
The main character, a hikikomori reincarnated in a fantasy world. He was born as Reinhardt Orteus, the first prince of the Orteus Kingdom, but would be abandoned by the royal family. He went on to be adopted by Gold and now lives as Haruto. Since the devices used to measure people's mana levels weren't designed to measure numbers higher than two digits, everybody mistakenly believes Haruto's mana level is just 2, when it's actually 1,002. As he lacks an element, the only magic he can use is barrier magic, but he can do a wide variety of things with it; creating clones or even using them as TV screens to project his memories, connect to the 21st century's internet, or act as drones. He dresses up as an unstoppable hero whose name he changes several times, including Still Pending, Hero of Justice, Black Knight and Shiva. His hero disguise resembles Zero from Code Geass.
Charlotte Zenfis (シャルロッテ・ゼンフィス, Sharurotte Zenfisu)
Voiced by: Atsumi Tanezaki (Japanese); Kate Bristol (English)
Haruto's adoptive little sister. An intelligent and curious child who finds her brother an odd person but later grows to care for him romantically. Haruto even introduces Charlotte to anime, turning her into a chuunibiyo. She forms a faction of Liza, Flay, and Johnny to fight evil and bring justice as Charlotte starts masquerading as a fashion-magical girl Weiss Owl devoted to helping her brother.
Flay (フレイ, Furei)
Voiced by: Ayaka Shimizu (Japanese); Corey Pettit (English)
A young female Fenrir who once worked with the Demon lord. She was found attacking Haruto in the frontier region only to become his servant when a contract was formed between them for naming her. She has the ability to transform into a gorgeous young red-haired woman. Her rampageous moves often make Haruto anxious to let her do as she pleases.
Liza (リザ, Riza)
Voiced by: Wakana Kuramochi
A human-shaped hikikomori blue dragon who reads books until the Empirical adventures drive her out; books were the only treasure she hoarded. She was saved by Haruto and became his second servant. When attending the academy as his attendant, she conceals her horns.
Irisphilia (イリスフィア, Irisufia)
Voiced by: Ami Koshimizu (Japanese); Lindsay Seidel (English)
A white-haired female student at Royal Granfelt Specialized Academy of Magic whom Shiva (Haruto) met and rescued prior. Haruto calls her "Iris" for short. She is suggested to be the reincarnation of Demon Lord Irisphilia. Soon after her birth, her parents and relatives abandon her due to her already self-awareness and speaking, wanting political mutual power at a young age, and [correctly] deeming her a demon. She was taken to a monastery with only a single pastor who was kind to her before his passing. Initially possessing mana at level 5, until Haruto un-tangled her magic threads increasing her mana to level 23. While also possessing multiple hidden elements. Iris is in love with Haruto, even though he harbors no romantic feelings for her at all.
Laius Orteus (ライアス, Raiasu)
Voiced by: Shinnosuke Tachibana
Giselotte's second son. He is initially arrogant and prideful before losing to Haruto in a duel and gains respect for him. Laius is unaware that Haruto is his older brother. He is immensely fearful of his mother, although he can be protective of Marianne. In the process of five years, Laius shapes his body to a macho figure wanting to receive more of Haruto's attention in competition with Iris.
Marianne (マリアンヌ, Mariannu)
Voiced by: Manaka Iwami
Laius' older half-sister and Giselotte's stepdaughter. She has a crush on Haruto, not knowing that she is actually his sister as well. After Giselotte's downfall, Marianne is selected to be the Kingdom's new queen, acknowledging Haruto as her distant relative, and accepting the demons as her retainers.
Tearietta Luseiannel (ティアリエッタ・ルセイヤンネル, Tiarietta Ruseiyanneru)
Voiced by: Misaki Kuno
An eccentric professor "Tia" who goes to the extent of comprehending Ancient Magic. She highly respects Haruto's talents and believes his level to be higher than human expectations. Constantly soliciting Haruto's courtesy regarding his groundbreaking ideas and naturally pushing for more details. After learning the hero identities of Haruto and Charlotte, Tia offers her acceptance to further evaluate the antics.
Johnny (ジョニー, Jonī)
Voiced by: Nobutoshi Canna
An undead village chief of Pandemonium founded by him and Haruto.
Gigan (ギガン)
Voiced by: Chitose Morinaga
A golem that resides in the Zenfis territory with the undead.
Oratoria Belgam (オラトリア・ベルカム, Oratoria Berukamu)
Voiced by: Yūko Kaida
A strict professor who is completely set on teaching Magical Attributes and she is always at odds with Tia's heretical beliefs seeing her as a bad example for students. Oratoria idolizes Weiss Owl's hypothesis of Hidden Attributes, convincing herself it's Haruto when in actuality it's really Charlotte.
Schneider Hafen (シュナイダル・ハーフェン, Shunaidaru Hāfen)
Voiced by: Nobuhiko Okamoto
A tyrannical noble and school vice president. He intends to put his arbitrary decisions over moral rules without warning. He makes himself Haruto's self-proclaimed love rival with Iris, whom he sexually assaults. In spite of Haruto's immediate rejection of Schneidel's invitation for a duel, he places an excruciating curse on him for his inexcusable actions. Schneidel later injects a drug mutating him to fight and leaving him defeated. Note that Schneidel, son of Marquis Hafen, holds the same noble rank as Haruto Zenfis, son of Margrave Zenfis.
Giselotte Orteus (ギーゼロッテ・オルテアス, Gīzerotte Oruteasu)
Voiced by: Yū Kobayashi (Japanese); Lydia Mackay (English)
Haruto's nefarious biological mother and serves as the antagonist of the series. Having been abandoned by her as an infant for being mistakenly labeled to be weak, he harbors great resentment towards his mother especially whenever she offends Charlotte. Shiva fought her and placed a slave collar, forcing his mother to never go against his adoptive family. However, she still firmed in dominating her own capital and even her ex-husband, Haruto's father (were it not for the fact that Giselotte kept civil war at bay by simply being ruler, Haruto would have killed her already).

== Media ==
=== Light novel ===
Written by Sai Sumimori, the series began publication on the novel posting website Shōsetsuka ni Narō on September 1, 2018. The series was later acquired by Kodansha, who began publishing the series in print with illustrations by Ai Takahashi on May 31, 2019. As of February 2026, eight volumes have been released.

In March 2022, Kodansha USA announced that they licensed the series for English publication.

==== Volumes ====
No.	Original release date	Original ISBN	English release date	English ISBN
1	May 31, 2019	978-4-06-516173-9	January 3, 2023	978-1-64-729192-1
2	October 3, 2019	978-4-06-517915-4	April 25, 2023	978-1-64-729200-3
3	June 2, 2020	978-4-06-519786-8	July 25, 2023	978-1-64-729201-0
4	January 4, 2021	978-4-06-521534-0	November 21, 2023	978-1-64-729202-7
5	October 1, 2021	978-4-06-525146-1	March 12, 2024	978-1-64-729203-4
6	July 1, 2023	978-4-06-532784-5	March 25, 2025	978-1-64-729356-7
7	September 2, 2025	978-4-06-540767-7	—	—
8	February 2, 2026	978-4-06-542617-3	—	—

=== Manga ===
A manga adaptation, illustrated by Takahashi, began serialization on the Niconico-based Suiyōbi no Sirius manga platform on April 3, 2019. In April 2022, the series went on hiatus; Takahashi cited "personal circumstances" as the reason for the hiatus. As of September 2026, the manga's individual chapters have been collected into twenty-one tankōbon volumes.

In October 2020, Kodansha USA announced that they licensed the manga adaptation for digital English publication. During their panel at Anime Expo 2022, Kodnasha USA announced that they would publish the manga in print in Q2 2023.

==== Volumes ====
No.	Original release date	Original ISBN	English release date	English ISBN
1	October 9, 2019	978-4-06-517259-9	November 24, 2020 (digital); March 7, 2023 (print)	978-1-64-659814-4 (digital); 978-1-64-651770-1 (print)
2	March 9, 2020	978-4-06-518762-3	December 22, 2020 (digital); March 28, 2023 (print)	978-1-64-659872-4 (digital); 978-1-64-651771-8 (print)
3	August 6, 2020	978-4-06-520611-9	January 26, 2021 (digital); May 30, 2023 (print)	978-1-64-659920-2 (digital); 978-1-64-651772-5 (print)
4	December 9, 2020	978-4-06-521575-3	May 25, 2021 (digital); July 25, 2023 (print)	978-1-63-699109-2 (digital); 978-1-64-651773-2 (print)
5	May 7, 2021	978-4-06-523084-8	September 28, 2021 (digital); November 7, 2023 (print)	978-1-63-699380-5 (digital); 978-1-64-651774-9 (print)
6	November 9, 2021	978-4-06-525739-5	April 19, 2022 (digital); March 26, 2024 (print)	978-1-68-491135-6 (digital); 978-1-64-651775-6 (print)
7	September 8, 2022	978-4-06-528882-5	February 28, 2023 (digital); August 27, 2024 (print)	978-1-68-491716-7 (digital); 978-1-64-651776-3 (print)
8	February 9, 2023	978-4-06-530762-5	July 25, 2023 (digital); December 31, 2024 (print)	979-8-88-933053-0 (digital); 978-1-64-651997-2 (print)
9	June 8, 2023	978-4-06-531970-3	September 26, 2023 (digital); March 18, 2025 (print)	979-8-88-933156-8 (digital); 979-8-88-877023-8 (print)
10	August 8, 2023	978-4-06-532469-1	February 27, 2024 (digital); June 17, 2025 (print)	979-8-88-933384-5 (digital); 979-8-88-877209-6 (print)
11	December 7, 2023	978-4-06-533871-1	July 23, 2024 (digital); November 17, 2026 (print)	979-8-88-933627-3 (digital); 979-8-88-877320-8 (print)
12	April 9, 2024	978-4-06-535097-3	October 22, 2024 (digital)	979-8-89-478105-1
13	July 9, 2024	978-4-06-535996-9	January 28, 2025 (digital)	979-8-89-478322-2
14	November 8, 2024	978-4-06-537405-4	June 24, 2025 (digital)	979-8-89-478556-1
15	February 7, 2025	978-4-06-538356-8	October 28, 2025 (digital)	979-8-89-478731-2
16	June 9, 2025	978-4-06-539693-3	February 24, 2026 (digital)	979-8-89-478892-0
17	September 9, 2025	978-4-06-540997-8	April 28, 2026 (digital)	979-8-89-830072-2
18	December 9, 2025	978-4-06-541783-6	July 28, 2026 (digital)	979-8-89-830175-0
19	March 9, 2026	978-4-06-542770-5	September 29, 2026 (digital)	979-8-89-830287-0
20	June 9, 2026	978-4-06-543742-1	—	—
21	September 9, 2026	978-4-06-544780-2	—	—

=== Anime ===
On September 7, 2022, an anime television series adaptation was announced. It is produced by Staple Entertainment and directed by Takashi Naoya, with Matsuo Asami serving as assistant director, Tatsuya Takahashi supervising the scripts co-written by Tetsuya Yamada, Shōko Yasuda designing the characters, and Yukari Hashimoto composing the music. The series aired from July 2 to October 1, 2023, on ABC and TV Asahi's Animazing!!! programming block. (Note: ABC and TV Asahi listed the series premiere on July 1 at 26:00, which is effectively July 2 at 2:00 a.m. JST.) The opening theme song is "Reset Life?" (リセット ライフ？) by Lezel, while the ending theme song is "Himi CHU★Pre-Love Magic" (ひみCHU★プリラブマジック) by Star★Shiμ'ne!!!. Crunchyroll streamed the series.

==== Episodes ====
No.	Title	Directed by (Note: Information is taken from the ending credits of each episode.)	Written by	Storyboarded by	Original release date
1	"Starting at Rock Bottom After Reincarnation"; Transliteration: "Tensei Shitara Donzoko Sutāto" (Japanese: 転生したらどん底スタート)	Matsuo Asami	Tatsuya Takahashi	Takashi Naoya	July 2, 2023
A hikikomori is reincarnated to another world with superior magic, though he just plans to be a hikikomori again. He awakens as newborn Prince Reinhardt, son of King Jilq and Queen Gizelotte the former heroine. Discovering his magic level is only 02 and he can only use Barrier magic, the embarrassed parents abandon him in a forest. It is revealed the measuring crystal only measures two digits; his power level is actually 1002, on par with a God. Reinhardt finds Barrier magic has a variety of uses, allowing him to fly and fight. He defeats a Flame Fenrir named Flay and, wanting to hide his royal lineage, impulsively claims he is Demon Lord Haruto and takes her as his familiar in the form of a beautiful young woman (whom he develops a secret crush on). Count Gold Zenfris, a relative of King Jilq, is disgusted by Jilq's actions and secretly adopts Haruto as his son and Flay his servant. Nine years later Haruto lives with Gold, his mother Natalia and sister Charlotte. He struggles with Charlotte who appears not to like him but also plans to quietly run away one day. Gold starts teaching him the sword but Haruto, having refined his mastery of Barrier magic, is now a powerful fighter. Gold and Natalia worry Haruto's strange abilities might mean he has a demon ancestor, also explaining Flay's attachment to him, but are satisfied they have raised him as a good man.
2	"Char Hates Me"; Transliteration: "Sharu ni Kirawaretemasu" (Japanese: シャルに嫌われてます)	Matsuo Asami	Tatsuya Takahashi	Masayoshi Nishida	July 9, 2023
Gold returns from a failed raid on a bandit hideout with 100 injured men whom Haruto secretly heals. That night Haruto and Flay leave to massacre the bandits in revenge; Char accidentally sees them flying away. Haruto learns the bandits are soldiers from neighbouring Empire, sent to cause chaos in the Kingdom with help from a treasonous, high ranking Kingdom official. Haruto has all the information sent to Gold in an anonymous letter. Due to the use of fire magic Gold suspects Flay killed the invaders. Char is suspicious of Haruto because of his scary aura, the reason she doesn't like him, so she starts following him around. Eventually, Natalia takes Char on a trip to a festival but are attacked by Empire soldiers. Alerted by his security barrier Haruto sends them psychic directions to escape to safety and flies there in time to save them. Natalia passes out so only Char sees it is Haruto. She decides he must be a hero, despite his aura, and promises to keep it a secret. Gold is suspicious of the anonymous person who keeps performing good deeds, especially when Char starts being nice to Haruto, but resigns himself to never knowing the whole truth.
3	"Char Adores Me Now"; Transliteration: "Sharu ni Natsukaremashita" (Japanese: シャルに懐かれました)	Ryō Nakamura	Tetsuya Yamada	Masayoshi Nishida	July 16, 2023
Char starts obsessively clinging onto Haruto and discovers his interest in ancient magic, which he believes his Barrier magic is related to. She shows him books on ancient magic in the family library. When he tells her about anime she is desperate to watch it, so he invents a barrier that connects to Japan's internet. This requires teaching her Japanese which she masters in two weeks and is soon watching so much anime he limits her to three hours a day. Char ends up seeing his royal crest birthmark but mistakes it for a hero insignia. Gold leaves to deal with common bandits, so Char demands Haruto transform into his hero form to help Gold. This inspires Haruto to do just that, utilizing a barrier disguise to appear as a masked adult. After capturing the bandits he introduces himself to Gold as Still Pending and takes credit for all of Haruto's anonymous deeds. After years of work Haruto finally produces a barrier clone of himself that can replace him when necessary. Their home is visited by Prince Laius and Princess Marianne whom Haruto realizes must be his younger siblings born after he was abandoned. Laius is an arrogant bully and challenges Haruto to a duel, but is defeated and humiliated. Marianne, more polite and intelligent, can't believe Haruto only registers as level 2.
4	"I Flip My Lid"; Transliteration: "Ore Kireru" (Japanese: 俺・キレる)	Matsuo Asami	Tetsuya Yamada	Takashi Naoya	July 30, 2023 (Note: This episode aired at 2:20 a.m. JST, 20 minutes after the original air time on All-Nippon News Network.)
Laius remains bitter over his defeat. His servant suggests he spend time getting to know Char during his tour of the kingdom. This makes Haruto suspicious. That night Haruto defeats a group of mages who admit they were sent by the Queen to assassinate Char, who has the magical potential to surpass the Queen's own power. Haruto realises the Queen, his birth mother Gizelotte, must be evil and knows from personal experience she is willing to kill children if it serves her purpose. He swears to keep Char safe, even if he has to assassinate Gizelotte. Haruto learns from Gold Gizelotte was an adventurer before she killed the Demon Lord and married King Jilq, but in her quest for power she has overthrown Jilq and now rules alone, so her death would cause civil war as nobles fought for the throne. Gold hopes Char might one day be powerful enough to overthrow Gizelotte and replace her as a benevolent queen. To this end he enlists Haruto's help in protecting Char until she grows up. Haruto agrees, though privately he desires his own revenge on Gizelotte and begins planning to kill her himself.
5	"Strongest in the World"; Transliteration: "Sekai Saikyō" (Japanese: 世界最強)	Matsuo Asami	Tatsuya Takahashi	Masayoshi Nishida	August 6, 2023
Haruto successfully infiltrates Gizelotte's castle as Still Pending. Even with her powers as the hero Gizelotte is defeated with ease. Haruto fits her with a slave collar and allows her to remain queen but warns any attempt to remove the collar or kill Char will make the collar sever her head. He departs, leaving her totally humiliated. Five years later there have been no further assassination attempts and Char is growing up happily. Gizelotte has become a recluse and Haruto decides he can become a hikikomori again. Unfortunately Gold reveals Haruto must attend magic academy in the capital for three years as former-King Jilq has sponsored his attendance with the unspoken instruction to make friends with Marianne and Laius. Still pining for his hikikomori life Haruto instead decides to send his barrier clone that can't use magic, hoping its lack of ability will lead to a justified expulsion that won't upset Jilq or Gold. Meanwhile he retreats to his secret mountain cabin hoping for at least three years of total isolation, except for when Flay brings Char to watch anime. Haruto manages to make a teleportation barrier to make her trips easier, and to talk with his clone in the capital.
6	"I Need to Find an Attendant...!"; Transliteration: "Jūsha o Sagasanai to...!" (Japanese: 従者を探さないと...！)	Ryō Nakamura	Tetsuya Yamada	Kōji Iwai	August 20, 2023 (Note: This episode aired at 2:30 a.m. JST, 30 minutes after the original air time on All-Nippon News Network.)
Haruto abruptly remembers he was supposed to find a new attendant to follow him to the academy. He visits Pandemonium, a secret village in the mountains populated by the skeleton army of the mages Gizelotte sent to assassinate Char, including the golem Gigan. After five years the skeletons have developed personalities and consider Haruto their saviour; Gigan even turned out to be a shy young female. Their chief, Johnny, reveals with Flay's help they have begun taking in other monsters with nowhere else to live and the village has grown into a farming community. Unfortunately Haruto doesn't find a suitable attendant among them. A Blizzard Dragon is pushed from its home by Imperial mercenaries. Gold worries it might invade the Kingdom so Haruto and Flay go and find it injured just inside the Empires border. After defeating the mercenaries and healing the dragon Haruto learns she is a bookworm and fellow Hikikomori who has lived in complete isolation for 300 years, except for occasionally visiting cities disguised as a young girl to acquire books. As the mercenaries have burned her home and books Haruto invites her to live in Pandemonium. She accepts Haruto as her master and is given the name Liza.
7	"Meeting of the Round Table"; Transliteration: "Entaku Kaigi" (Japanese: 円卓会議)	Matsuo Asami	Tatsuya Takahashi	Masayoshi Nishida	August 27, 2023
Liza begins working as a maid alongside Flay who is perturbed Liza is somehow a perfect maid without any training. Liza quickly becomes Char's personal maid and magic instructor. Haruto is tempted to make her his attendant but can't bring himself to take her away from Char. Char learns Haruto will be attending the academy and gathers her Round Table Knights (Flay, Liza, Johnny and Gigan) to plan how to protect Haruto, since her understanding of schools from watching anime is that there will be a secret evil council, supported by a corrupt noble who becomes Haruto's enemy. Johnny and Gigan are left to expand Pandemonium's army while Char, Flay and Liza pre-emptively investigate the evil council. Liza tells this to Haruto who plays along as a means to make Liza his attendant without upsetting Char, certain once he is expelled Char will naturally abandon her plan anyway.
8	"A New Encounter"; Transliteration: "Arata na Deai" (Japanese: 新たな出会い)	Matsuo Asami	Tetsuya Yamada	Takashi Naoya	September 3, 2023
Laius hopes to rematch Haruto. Marianne now holds a crush on Haruto. Cultists of the Lucifyra Church are spreading their aims to overthrow the monarchy. Laius has become scared of Gizelotte as he believes she is using the cult to get rid of Jilq permanently. Marianne hopes Haruto can do something while Laius prefers to seek out the black knight. Gizelotte overhears, attacks Marianne and orders Laius to become Haruto's friend to discover Black Knight's identity. Laius feels guilty he might have unintentionally put Haruto in danger. At the capital Haruto saves travellers from a monster as black knight, attracting the attention of one of them, a red eyed woman named Irisphilia who gives Liza a strange feeling. Haruto registers with his fellow students, who he doesn't fit in with at all, then teleports back to his mountain cabin to recover. Unfortunately Char insists they go right back to the city to try a restaurant. They encounter Irisphilia who almost recognises Haruto as Still Pending from the feel of his magic power. Haruto feels she is mocking him as he still believes his magic level is 02. After she leaves Char also claims Irisphilia felt strange.
9	"The Entrance Ceremony Hullabaloo"; Transliteration: "Nyūgakushiki no Suttamonda" (Japanese: 入学式のすったもんだ)	Ryō Nakamura	Tatsuya Takahashi	Kōji Iwai	September 10, 2023
Haruto-C informs Haruto they must pass an exam before the entrance ceremony, so Haruto plans to fail and be expelled but when ancient magic researcher Doctor Luseiannel measures his magic it explodes the crystal sensor. She correctly deduces Haruto has so much magic the crystal couldn't handle it, approves his acceptance and appoints herself his advisor, but he refuses, believing she is mocking his low magic level. As Haruto-C has no magic Haruto gives him a shield barrier and magic pistol. Haruto-C encounters Irisphilia and student vice-president Schneider who tries to bully them both. Haruto-C's barrier protects him and his pistol injures Schneider. Haruto-C is so stressed Haruto replaces him and is immediately challenged to a duel by Schneider. That night via his security barriers he watches Irisphilia apologise to Schneider who agrees to cancel the duel if she dances naked, so she strips. Exasperated, Haruto saves her as Still Pending and yells at her for being such a naïve airhead. He also places a barrier on Schneider's bullet wound as punishment, warning it will tighten and cause pain if he uses magic or tries to remove the barrier and will last until he atones for his dishonourable behaviour. Schneider swears revenge on Still Pending.
10	"The Demon King's Name"; Transliteration: "Maō no Na wa" (Japanese: 魔王の名は)	Chie Yamazaki	Tatsuya Takahashi	Chie Yamazaki	September 17, 2023
Luseiannel explains first years must choose either Knight classes to learn combat, or Research classes to invent new spells. Laius and Marianne interrupt as they want Haruto to join their classes. Haruto is grateful when Irisphilia appears, using the excuse to avoid choosing a class. Irisphilia is instinctively aware there are two Haruto's, as well as Still Pending, causing Haruto to suspect she is a demon. She asks Haruto to be her first friend, explaining she kept being abandoned by foster families so she is terrible at communicating. Haruto is compelled to agree and joins her ancient magic research class, which unfortunately is also Luseiannel's class. Elsewhere, Flay reminisces on the previous Demon Lord, a kind man who sought peace with humans until Gizelotte killed him. Flay believes he reincarnated as Haruto, when in fact he reincarnated as Irisphilia, whom Haruto nicknames Iris. Char teleports to the academy and is happy Haruto has begun assembling a harem of wives, as long as she marries him too one day. Iris is baffled by Char's bizarre claims, as well as Haruto letting Char pick his other classes since, according to Char, he has already mastered magic and there is nothing left the academy could possibly teach him. Haruto promises to help Iris work hard, but privately still plans to be expelled.
11	"I Got Myself Mixed Up with So Many People..."; Transliteration: "Ironna Hito ni Karamaremashita..." (Japanese: いろんな人に絡まれました...)	Matsuo Asami	Tatsuya Takahashi	Masayoshi Nishida	September 24, 2023
Haruto begins attending classes in C classroom for average students while Iris attends advanced A classroom. C class is given another exam so Haruto deliberately gets 60%, not realising the "easy questions" were actually quite advanced and 60% is unbelievably high for a C student, so he is promoted to A classroom with Iris and Laius. Professor Belkam discusses the difficulties of accurately measuring magic levels which crystal sensors are only able to give a general estimate of. Haruto makes a thoughtless observation about hidden magic effects crystals can't sense, a cutting edge theory only anonymous genius Weise Eule has ever proposed before. Belkam becomes convinced Haruto is a genius, maybe even Weise Eule himself, though since Weise Eule is German for White Owl Haruto realises it must be Char. Exhausted, he switches with Haruto-C who attends Luseiannel's research lab and finds her experimenting on Schneider, determining the barrier Still-Pending placed on him is definitely ancient magic from the mythical era that can only be used by someone level 80 or higher. Luseiannel is intrigued by Still-Pending and in her obsession correctly deduces Haruto-C is Still-Pending. Sensing his shock Haruto appears as Still-Pending to alleviate her suspicions, pretending he is following up on Schneider's punishment. Luseiannel attempts to capture him to interrogate him on ancient magic, but he escapes and threatens her into stopping looking for him.
12	"Not a Bad Night"; Transliteration: "Warukunai Yoru" (Japanese: 悪くない夜)	Ryō Nakamura	Tatsuya Takahashi	Takashi Naoya	October 1, 2023
Luseiannel throws a welcome party at her mansion at which Iris becomes drunk and passes out in Haruto-C's lap. Luseiannel reveals Iris is studying ancient magic because she possesses all 6 magic elements. Unfortunately her magic level is only 05 so she hopes ancient magic might increase it. Schneider, having plotted with the Lucifyra church to marry his father to Gizelotte and become the new prince and heir to the throne, fears Still-Pending ruining those plans and sends assassins to kill Haruto-C, Iris and Luseiannel. Haruto overhears Schneider through a CCTV barrier, captures the assassins and interrogates them. He visits Schneider to punish him further, but Schneider injects himself with a potion, turning into a giant monster. With Char's advice, Haruto turns Schneider back to normal without killing him, albeit mentally disturbed. Haruto visits Haruto-C and they realize Haruto-C is getting used to being around people and is actually starting to enjoy it. Char shares CCTV footage of Haruto's fight with her Round Table as certain proof of a secret evil council targeting Haruto. Renaming themselves the Camelot Kingdom, Char decides to infiltrate the academy to find the council members. Watching Char's antics Haruto can't deny there is some sort of group Schneider was involved with, so he lets Char do as she likes, but keeps a secret watch on her in case she gets herself in danger.
