= The Demons Are Planning Something Good! =

Japanese manga series

- First tankōbon volume cover

魔のものたちは企てる (Ma no Mono-tachi wa Kuwadateru)
- Genre: Fantasy comedy
- Manga
- Written by: Takuji Katō
- Illustrated by: Gashigashi
- Published by: Fujimi Shobo
- English publisher: NA: Yen Press
- Imprint: Dragon Comics Age
- Magazine: DraDra Sharp
- Original run: March 24, 2023 – present
- Volumes: 4
- Anime television series
- Directed by: Takuya Asaoka
- Written by: Kazuyuki Fudeyasu
- Studio: TNK
- Original run: 2027 – scheduled
- icon

The Demons Are Planning Something Good! (Japanese: 魔のものたちは企てる, Hepburn: Ma no Mono-tachi wa Kuwadateru) is a Japanese manga series written by Takuji Katō and illustrated by Gashigashi. It began serialization on the Niconico Seiga website under Fujimi Shobo's DraDra Sharp brand in March 2023. An anime television series adaptation produced by TNK is set to premiere in 2027.

== Plot ==
Negative emotions from humans are the nourishment that demons need. Lord Mercysnare is only interested in magical power from seeing humans get humiliated. To gain that power, Lord Mercysnare researches traps such as slime that dissolves clothes or tentacle bindings, among others.

== Characters ==
Lord Mercysnare (憐罠卿, Renbinkyō)
Voiced by: Junichi Suwabe
Letze (レツェ, Retse)
Voiced by: Wakana Kuramochi
Merisha (メリシャ)
Voiced by: Haruka Shiraishi

== Media ==
=== Manga ===
Written by Takuji Katō and illustrated by Gashigashi, The Demons Are Planning Something Good! began serialization on the Niconico Seiga website under Fujimi Shobo's DraDra Sharp brand on March 24, 2023. Its chapters have been collected into four tankōbon volumes as of July 2026.

In February 2025, Yen Press announced that they had licensed the series for English publication, with the first volume set to release in August later in the year.

No.	Original release date	Original ISBN	North American release date	North American ISBN
1	December 25, 2023	978-4-04-075238-9	August 26, 2025	979-8-8554-1298-7
1. "Lord Mercysnare"; 2. "That Which Wriggles"; 3. "Letze the Assistant's Secret"; 4. "The Demon Lord Army's Brainwashing Department"; 5. "The Other Me"; 6. "The Tentacles of Evil Beside Me"; 7. "The Motivated"; 8. "Letze Gets Stuck in a Hole"; 9. "Merisha Strikes Back"; Bonus
2	October 25, 2024	978-4-04-075643-1	March 24, 2026	979-8-8554-2414-0
10. "Shapeshifters"; 11. "The Shining Wings vs. The Barrier Broken Only By Sex"; 12. "The Demon Lord Army's Possession Team"; 13. "Unnamed Challenger"; 14. "The Spectacular Adventurer"; 15. "Attack of the Demonic Alteration Department"; 16. "Brainwashing × Alteration"; 17. "Letze Challenges the Endless Loop"; 18. "Adventuring Parties Unite: Merisha and Lysta's Story"; Bonus
3	August 8, 2025	978-4-04-076031-5	December 15, 2026	979-8-8554-3867-3
4	July 9, 2026	978-4-04-076500-6	—	—

=== Anime ===
An anime television series adaptation was announced on March 24, 2025. It is set to be produced by TNK and directed by Takuya Asaoka, with series composition handled by Kazuyuki Fudeyasu and characters designed by Hiraku Kaneko. The series is set to premiere in 2027.
