= Flavors of Youth =

2018 animated film

- Chinese poster
- Simplified Chinese: 肆式青春
- Kanji: 詩季織々
- Directed by: Li Haoling; Jiaoshou Yi Xiaoxing; Yoshitaka Takeuchi
- Produced by: Yuuta Hori; Tang Yunkang; Yasutaka Inagaki
- Starring: Taito Ban; Mariya Ise; Takeo Otsuka; Ikumi Hasegawa; Minako Kotobuki; Haruka Shiraishi; Hiroki Yasumoto
- Music by: Asuka Sakai; Yuma Yamaguchi (Note: Credited under his stage name "yuma yumaguchi".); Rei Ishizuka; Saori
- Production companies: Haoliners Animation League; CoMix Wave Films
- Distributed by: StudioCanal; Netflix (international); Tokyo Theatres (Japan); Joy Pictures (China)
- Release dates: July 6, 2018 (Anime Expo premiere); August 4, 2018
- Running time: 75 minutes
- Countries: China; Japan
- Languages: Mandarin; Japanese; Cantonese; Shanghainese
- Box office: CN¥2.8 million (China)

Flavors of Youth (Japanese: 詩季織々, romanized: shikioriori, lit. "From Season to Season"; Chinese: 肆式青春; pinyin: sì shì qīng chūn, Cantonese Jyutping: sei³ sik¹ cing¹ ceon¹, Shanghainese Wugniu: sy⁵ seq⁷ chin¹ tshen¹, lit. "Necessities of Life in Youth") is a 2018 anime/donghua anthology drama film directed by Li Haoling, Jiaoshou Yi Xiaoxing and Yoshitaka Takeuchi and produced by Noritaka Kawaguchi. A Japanese-Chinese co-production between CoMix Wave Films and Haoliners Animation League, it was released in Japan and in China on August 4, 2018, and globally on the same day by StudioCanal and Netflix.

== Plot ==
The film is based on the tradition of "four basic necessities of life", like each other and is divided into three storylines:

- The Rice Noodles (Japanese: 陽だまりの朝食, romanized: hidamari no chōshoku, simplified Chinese: 一碗乡愁; traditional Chinese: 一碗鄉愁; pinyin: yì wǎn xiāng chóu), focusing on food
- A Little Fashion Show (Japanese: 小さなファッションショー, romanized: chīsana fasshonshō, Chinese: 霓裳浮光; pinyin: ní cháng fú guāng, Jyutping: ngai⁴ soeng⁴ fau⁴ gwong¹), focusing on clothing
- Love in Shanghai (Japanese: 上海恋, romanized: shanhai koi, simplified Chinese: 纤雨初晴; traditional Chinese: 纖雨初晴; pinyin: xiān yǔ chū qíng, Wugniu: shi¹ yu⁶ tshu¹ zhin⁶), focusing on housing and transportation

=== The Rice Noodles ===
Taking place in Hunan Province and Beijing, Xiao Ming reminisces about his memories with his grandmother through his love for San Xian noodles. When Xiao Ming was young, he and his grandmother ate San Xian noodles from a local noodle shop that to him showed care and effort for their food. However, the shop closed down with speculation that the owners were pushed out due to jealousy or a client wanted them back in Beijing. Xiao Ming then went to another noodle shop in his town, and although the shop buys pre-made San Xian noodles, the noodle soup had many toppings much to Xiao Ming's satisfaction. Later, the husband of the owner of that noodle shop wanted the noodle shop to become a fishing shop. However, after bad business and the couple's son getting hospitalized in a knife fight with some students at his school, the noodle shop reopened with the husband and son of the owner working as well. Years later in Beijing, Xiao Ming went to a noodle shop that sold San Xian noodles that had fewer toppings and a higher price, which dissatisfied Xiao Ming. He later heard the news back in Hunan that his grandmother was dying and came back as soon as possible. Xiao Ming finally met his grandmother at his home minutes before her death and grieved. Xiao Ming later came back to the noodle shop in his town, and through its San Xian noodles, felt nostalgic of his times with his grandmother and was content with the future that was ahead of him.

=== A Little Fashion Show ===
Taking place in Guangzhou, Yi Lin is a fashion model and her younger sister Lulu is a student in designing clothes. After getting drunk on her birthday and receiving a hangover, Yi Lin slept late for a fashion show evaluation. Yi Lin was also growing annoyed by Shui Jing, a fan of hers that was growing to become a competitor. Yi Lin, to compensate for this, exercised a great deal to look more attractive, though this became overbearing for her and she fainted in the upcoming fashion show. Yi Lin, seeing no purpose in continuing her career in the fashion industry, asked Lulu to help her learn how to design and sew clothes, triggering an argument between the two sisters. Yi Lin explained to her manager about her situation, and her manager gave her a slip to meet up at a place. Yi Lin comes to the place, which turns out to be an abandoned factory, and receives a surprise encounter from Lulu. Lulu gave Yi Lin a red dress, something that she had dreamed about earlier in the segment. It later turns out that a fashion show is being hosted in the factory. Thanks to the encouragement from Lulu and her manager, Yi Lin performed well in the show. Lulu later graduated and now designs clothes for Yi Lin, and Yi Lin had recently come back to prominence in the fashion industry, with both sisters had shown contentment in what they do.

=== Love in Shanghai ===
Taking place in a shikumen in Shanghai from 1999 to the modern-day, Li Mo has a friendly relationship with Xiao Yu. After Xiao Yu got injured trying to go back home, Li Mo carried her on his back to her apartment. Since Xiao Yu could not go to school due to her injury, she asks Li Mo to record the lessons in cassette tapes so she may listen to the tapes and learn what she missed. Xiao Yu later responds back to Li Mo in cassette tapes and the two develop a romantic relationship with each other. Soon, Xiao Yu told Li Mo that her family is making her apply to an elite high school far away and that they would have to move away, angering Li Mo. Li Mo later decided to apply to the same high school, though the academic gap between Li Mo and Xiao Yu was large. Li Mo, through hard work and a studious behavior, got accepted into the high school, and when he went to Xiao Yu's apartment to tell the news, he learned that Xiao Yu is in the hospital after her father beat her for failing the application test. Li Mo did not get the chance to see her since his family had to move away to live close to the high school. Now an architect, Li Mo recently learned that Xiao Yu went to the United States to study abroad, much to his dissatisfaction. After finding a cassette tape from Xiao Yu, Li Mo went into his grandmother's home to find a recorder. The tape revealed to Li Mo that Xiao Yu purposely failed the application test to stay with Li Mo, prompting Li Mo to mourn for his actions. Years later, Li Mo, now taking care of his own motel in a renovated shikumen, sees Xiao Yu in the front door and smiles.

In a post-credits scene, the prominent characters in each segment finally meet up with one another in an airport, content with the simple joys of life and the future that lies ahead.

== Cast ==
Character	Japanese voice actor	Chinese voice actor	English dubbing actor	Segment
Xiao Ming	Taito Ban	Bai Ke	Crispin Freeman	The Rice Noodles
Xiao Ming (Young)	Mariya Ise	Chang Rongshan	Kendall Gimbi	The Rice Noodles
Yi Lin (Irin)	Minako Kotobuki	Peng Shixin	Evan Rachel Wood	A Little Fashion Show
Lulu	Haruka Shiraishi	Yanny Chan Wing Yan	Jona Xiao	A Little Fashion Show
Mr. Steve	Hiroki Yasumoto	Li Jiaheng	George Ackles	A Little Fashion Show
Li Mo (Rimo)	Takeo Ōtsuka	Liang Dawei	Ross Butler	Love in Shanghai
Xiao Yu	Ikumi Hasegawa	Tang Dawei	Erica Mendez	Love in Shanghai

The Mainland Chinese dub includes Cantonese and Shanghainese in their respective sections.

== Reception ==
=== Box office ===
The film earned CN¥2.8 million at the Chinese box office.

=== Reception ===
On Rotten Tomatoes, the film has an 80% approval rating based on five reviews with an average rating of 5.5/10.

Kim Morrissy of Anime News Network gave the film an overall grade of B, praising the "polished background art" while criticizing the "weak character animation", and said that "Flavors of Youth may be far from a masterpiece, but I'm glad that it brought the talented artists at CoMix Wave Films together to portray this sentimental image of China's beautiful cities."
