= Vermeil in Gold =

Japanese manga series and its adaptation(s)

- Vermeil in Gold: The Failing Student and the Strongest Scourge Plunge Into the World of Magic
- Cover of the first tankōbon volume

金装のヴェルメイユ〜崖っぷち魔術師は最強の厄災と魔法世界を突き進む〜 (Kinsō no Verumeiyu: Gakeppuchi Majutsushi wa Saikyō no Yakusai to Mahō Sekai o Tsukisusumu)
- Genre: Fantasy; Romantic comedy
- Manga
- Written by: Kōta Amana
- Illustrated by: Yōko Umezu
- Published by: Square Enix
- Magazine: Monthly Shōnen Gangan
- Original run: August 10, 2018 – June 12, 2026
- Volumes: 11
- Anime television series
- Directed by: Takashi Naoya
- Written by: Tatsuya Takahashi
- Music by: Ken Itō; Kenichi Kuroda
- Studio: Staple Entertainment
- Licensed by: Sentai Filmworks
- Original network: AT-X, Tokyo MX, BS11, SUN
- Original run: July 5, 2022 – September 20, 2022
- Episodes: 12
- icon

Vermeil in Gold: The Failing Student and the Strongest Scourge Plunge Into the World of Magic (Note: Japanese: 金装のヴェルメイユ〜崖っぷち魔術師は最強の厄災と魔法世界を突き進む〜, Hepburn: Kinsō no Verumeiyu: Gakeppuchi Majutsushi wa Saikyō no Yakusai to Mahō Sekai o Tsukisusumu) is a Japanese manga series written by Kōta Amana and illustrated by Yōko Umezu. The series was serialized in Square Enix's shōnen manga magazine Monthly Shōnen Gangan from August 2018 to June 2026, with its chapters collected into eleven tankōbon volumes. An anime television series adaptation produced by Staple Entertainment aired from July to September 2022.

The story is centered around a young magician who accidentally makes a contract with a legendary and powerful female demon, eventually becoming her master and lover and the trials and challenges they face so that they can live in peace together.

== Plot ==
Alto Goldfield is a student at the Ortigia Magic Academy who is on the verge of failing his summoning magic class and being held back a year. Desperate to avoid this outcome, he discovers an ancient magic book that allows him to perform a powerful summoning ritual.

However, instead of a familiar spirit, Alto accidentally summons Vermeil, a beautiful but extremely powerful demon known as a “scourge” who once brought disaster to the world and was sealed away. To stay in the human world, Vermeil must regularly absorb magical energy from Alto through intimate physical contact, forming a binding contract between them.

Although initially overwhelmed and intimidated, Alto decides to keep Vermeil by his side and use her immense power to improve his own magical abilities. As they grow closer, Alto begins to gain confidence in his magic and life, while Vermeil gradually develops human emotions and a deep attachment to him.

Together, they navigate the dangers of the academy, rival students, and powerful magical threats. However, Vermeil’s true identity as a legendary demon and the consequences of her existence constantly put them at risk. The story follows their developing relationship, Alto’s growth as a mage, and the struggle to balance forbidden power with human bonds.

== Characters ==
Alto Goldfield (アルト・ゴールドフィルド, Aruto Gōrudofirudo)
Voiced by: Yūya Hirose (Japanese); Mike Haimoto (English)
First year at the Ortigia Academy of Magic, he is an A-grade student except in summoning class. At risk of repeating a year unless he performs a successful summoning, he discovers a grimoire in the school library. Performing the spell within, he succeeds in summoning a naked demon girl named Vermeil. His blood possesses a high degree of mana, making most summoned spirits avoid him despite his calls. Vermeil on the other hand likes "potent" mana, hence why she answered. Despite her high degree of power, she agrees to become Alto's familiar. His childhood friend, Lilia, is head over heels in love with him, but he never loved her in the slightest, and is often annoyed and even creeped out by her, making him avoid her at all costs.
Vermeil (ヴェルメイ, Verumei)
Voiced by: Maaya Uchida (Japanese); Monica Rial (English)
A female demon, who appears to be a succubus-type and a very powerful one. She is able to knock out a rampaging dragon with a finger flick. Vermeil seems to be sealed in some kind of grimoire, before Alto breaks her out. She needs to kiss Alto to drain his mana to live, she can also amplify the mana and transfer them to her contractor. She loves to tease him.
Lilia Kudelfeyt (リリア・クーデルフェイト, Riria Kūderufeito)
Voiced by: Wakana Kuramochi (Japanese); Kira Vincent-Davis (English)
Alto's childhood friend, who is in love with him and becomes jealous when Vermeil appears and other girls surrounds Alto, even though he does not love her at all, and often times tends to avoid her. She made a contract with a high-class wind spirit, named Sylphid.
Marx Parston (マルクス・パールストン, Marukusu Pārusuton)
Voiced by: Yū Okano (Japanese); Joe Daniels (English)
Cheryl Iridescence (シャロル・イリデッセンス, Sharoru Iridessensu)
Voiced by: Kaori Ishihara (Japanese); Annie Wild (English)
Francois (フランソワ, Furansowa)
Voiced by: Sakura Nakamura (Japanese); Brenda Palestina (English)
Elena Kimberlight (エレナ・キンバーライト, Erena Kinbāraito)
Voiced by: Kana Hanazawa (Japanese); Genevieve Simmons (English)
Shinōji Ryūga (シンオウジ・リューガ)
Voiced by: Kazuyuki Okitsu (Japanese); Jeremy Gee (English)
Jessica Schwarz (ジェシカ・シュバルツ, Jeshika Shubarutsu)
Voiced by: Riho Sugiyama (Japanese); Kara Greenberg (English)
Chris Westland (クリス・ウェストランド, Kurisu Wesutorando)
Voiced by: Yurina Amami (Japanese); Olivia Swasey (English)
Obsidian (オブシディアン, Obushidian)
Voiced by: Takehito Koyasu (Japanese); Adam Gibbs (English)
Iolite (アイオライト, Aioraito)
Voiced by: Nobuhiko Okamoto (Japanese); Scott Gibbs (English)
Kohakumiya (コハクミヤ)
Voiced by: Miyuri Shimabukuro (Japanese); Shelley Calene-Black (English)
Heliodor (ヘリオドール, Heriodōru)
Voiced by: Ikumi Hayama
Fatema (ファーテマ, Fātema)
Voiced by: Aya Endō

== Media ==
=== Manga ===
Written by Kōta Amana and illustrated by Yōko Umezu, Vermeil in Gold began serialization in Square Enix's shōnen manga magazine Monthly Shōnen Gangan on August 10, 2018. The first tankōbon volume was released on April 12, 2019. Eleven volumes have been released.

On August 12, 2026, Shōnen Gangan's editorial department announced that Yōko Umezu had died due to a cerebral infarction on July 7. It was further disclosed that the manga had ended serialization, with the last chapter released on June 12.

==== Volumes ====
No.	Japanese release date	Japanese ISBN
1	April 12, 2019	978-4-7575-6052-9
2	October 12, 2019	978-4-7575-6339-1
3	July 10, 2020	978-4-7575-6746-7
4	February 12, 2021	978-4-7575-7089-4
5	November 11, 2021	978-4-7575-7526-4
6	June 10, 2022	978-4-7575-7959-0
7	April 12, 2023	978-4-7575-8519-5
8	February 9, 2024	978-4-7575-9047-2
9	November 12, 2024	978-4-7575-9511-8
10	October 10, 2025	978-4-301-00113-3
11	June 11, 2026	978-4-301-00573-5

=== Anime ===
An anime television series adaptation was announced on March 10, 2022. The series is produced by Staple Entertainment and directed by Takashi Naoya, with scripts written by Tatsuya Takahashi, character designs handled by Kiyoshi Tateishi, and music composed by Ken Itō and Kenichi Kuroda. It aired from July 5 to September 20, 2022, on AT-X, Tokyo MX, BS11, and SUN. The opening theme song is "Abracada-Boo" by Kaori Ishihara, while the ending theme song is "Mortal With You" by Mili. Sentai Filmworks has licensed the series under the title Vermeil in Gold: A Desperate Magician Barges Into the Magical World Alongside the Strongest Calamity. At their Otakon panel in July 2022, Sentai Filmworks announced that the series would receive an English dub, which premiered on September 27, 2022.

==== Episodes ====
No.	Title	Directed by	Written by	Storyboarded by	Original release date
1	"The Desperate Magician and the Imprisoned Disaster"; Transliteration: "Gakeppuchi Majutsushi to Fūin Sareshi Yakusai" (Japanese: 崖っぷち魔術師と封印されし厄災)	Takashi Naoya	Tatsuya Takahashi	Takashi Naoya	July 5, 2022
At the Ortigia Academy of Magic, Alto must summon and form a contract with a familiar or else be held back a grade. He had failed the summoning spell before, but finds an old book and performs the spell within, summoning a naked demon girl named Vermeil. She kisses him to drain his mana and says she will serve him out of gratitude for his summoning breaking her out of imprisonment. She tries to seduce him, but he refuses and makes her wear his sister's dress and shoes. When he presents her to the class as his familiar, she conceals her horns and tail to pass for human. Alto's childhood friend Lilia becomes jealous and challenges them to a duel; if she wins, Vermeil will stay away from Alto, and if he wins, she will obey one command from him. Lilia's familiar, Sylphid, unleashes a powerful wind attack, but Vermeil effortlessly blocks it, then uses magic to make Lilia become so aroused that she forfeits. Alto orders Lilia to be friends with Vermeil. Later, Vermeil tells Alto that Lilia is in love with him, but he doesn't believe her, considering he doesn't love her at all. She kisses and drains him again and says she needs to or else she will disappear. She says sex would provide more mana and tries to seduce him, but he stops her and says kissing will suffice.
2	"The New Term and the Fairy Flower"; Transliteration: "Shin Gakki to Yōsei no Hana" (Japanese: 新学期と妖精の花)	Matsuo Asami	Tatsuya Takahashi	Takashi Naoya	July 12, 2022
Vermeil shocks everyone by knocking a rampaging dragon to the horizon with a finger flick. Alto scolds her for drawing attention to herself. The dragon's owner and his big brother, Rex, threatens them with Rex's dinosaur familiar, but Vermeil supercharges Alto's mana, allowing him to defeat them with his crystal magic. Alto says his dream is to be a splendid mage and Vermeil approves. The next day, they and Lilia meet their friends Marx and Cheryl, then the headmaster tells them whoever can retrieve a fairy flower from the forest will be the class representative. As they race, Marx is knocked out by a man-eating plant, forcing Cheryl to tend to him. The others find the flower guarded by a Cerberus with a cold, so Lilia drinks an invisibility potion. However, her clothes are not affected, forcing her to discard them. One of the Cerberus' heads was well allowing it to detect her, so Alto and Vermeil knock it out. Lilia gets the flower, but the invisibility wears off. In her embarrassment, she drops the flower and it blows away into Cheryl's hands. She wins the position and the others congratulate her.
3	"A Dragonrider's Beating Heart"; Transliteration: "Ryūki no Kodō" (Japanese: 竜騎の鼓動)	Ryō Nakamura	Tetsuya Yamada	Katsumi Terahigashi	July 19, 2022
Vermeil enjoys eating modern food for the first time, then the Dragonriders pass by and everyone admires the member Chris. After P.E., Cheryl encourages Lilia to confess her feelings to Alto while Lilia wonders if Vermeil is really human given her incredible power. Vermeil makes a scene by following Alto into the boy's locker room. Later, Vermeil enters Alto's shower and tries to seduce him again. Chris beats up Rex and expels him from the Dragonriders both for losing to Alto and because his familiar is a dinosaur and not a dragon. When Alto learns what happened, he angrily challenges Chris to a duel. She accepts and calls on her dragon. Vermeil supercharges Alto's mana, but Chris' fire spells are powerful enough to shatter Alto's crystal constructs and damage Vermeil when she blocks them. Chris rises into the sky on her dragon's back and boasts that dragons are the ultimate beings and all other creatures, including dinosaurs, are inferior. Determined to prove her wrong, Vermeil supercharges Alto again and he makes a huge crystal construct.
4	"A Creeping Madness"; Transliteration: "Shinobiyoru Kyōki" (Japanese: 忍び寄る狂気)	Matsuo Asami	Tetsuya Yamada	Katsumi Terahigashi	July 26, 2022
Alto and Vermeil use the construct as a distraction to reach Chris and hold a crystal shiv to her throat, winning the duel. Due to his victory, Alto becomes popular with the ladies, to Lilia's jealousy, but Professor Obsidian lectures him not to take duels lightly. Chris does her own chores and apologizes to Rex. Vermeil tries to seduce Alto again, but he says one should only kiss someone they love, so she says she loves him. Troubled, he asks Obsidian about human/demon romances; he replies demons only want humans for mana. Alto confronts Vermeil, but she proves herself by kissing him without draining him. Obsidian seduces a student, Emma Abelein, but injects her with something and leaves her frozen in ice. She is rescued but left in a coma, and the student council says Emma is the third student to be attacked. The class is assigned to write reports on their familiars. Alto reluctantly measures Vermeil's body. Lilia jealously spies on them with the invisibility potion after trusting Cheryl with her clothes. Alto brushes Lilia's nipple without noticing, leaving her in bliss. On his report, Alto lists Vermeil's likes as "sweets", but Vermeil adds "Alto". Meanwhile, a possessed Rex and his mutated dinosaur beat up Chris and her dragon.
5	"Rampage"; Transliteration: "Bōsō" (Japanese: 暴走)	Ryō Nakamura	Tatsuya Takahashi	Kōji Hōri	August 2, 2022
In a flashback, Rex summoned his dinosaur as an egg and Chris helped him hatch it, believing it was a dragon egg. Vermeil embarrasses Alto by showing public affection, then Rex's brother begs them for help. Rex continues to beat up Chris; he can withstand her fire spells and his body starts to mutate. As his brother, Alto, and Vermeil arrive, Rex says he wants revenge on Alto as well, but the student council president Elena arrives and knocks Rex and his dinosaur out cold with her sword, destroying their various growths. Chris watches over Rex in the infirmary. As an exam is coming up, Vermeil walks away and Lilia is eager to study with Alto alone. Vermeil meets Obsidian and says she knows he is the one attacking students and urges him to stop, but he injects her with something that causes her pain and makes her release dark energy. Everyone senses this and Elena rushes to the scene, but is stalled by a monster summoned by Obsidian. As Alto rushes to the scene, Vermeil transforms into an uncontrollable monster while Obsidian gloats.
6	"Wish"; Transliteration: "Negai" (Japanese: 願い)	Risshi Yamazaki	Tatsuya Takahashi	Risshi Yamazaki	August 9, 2022
Elena battles Obsidian's monster, which regenerates from each attack. Obsidian wraps a magic chain around Vermeil's neck to control her. As Alto and Lilia arrive, Obsidian gloats that he was attacking people and injecting them with demon essence to try to turn them into demons, but now he has a real demon. Vermeil suddenly breaks the chain and attacks Obsidian, but Alto shields him and is impaled on her claws. Enraged, she attacks Obsidian again, but Alto blocks her again and says not to kill before collapsing. Vermeil returns to normal and heals Alto. Obsidian freaks out, saying demons are not supposed to heal, then injects himself with his formula and transforms into a hideous demon, vowing to kill them all. Vermeil effortlessly punches a hole through him. He panics and tries to fly away, but Chris shoots him down and Vermeil knocks him out. The monster Elena was fighting retreats. Obsidian is arrested while all his victims wake up from their comas. Later, Vermeil sadly explains to Alto that to heal him, she linked their life forces together, so if one of them dies, the other will die as well. Vermeil then becomes cold to Alto and says her monster form was her true form, so she should stay away. Alto says he doesn't care and kisses her, leaving her flustered.
7	"Confession"; Transliteration: "Kokuhaku" (Japanese: 告白)	Ryō Nakamura	Tetsuya Yamada	Sung Min Kim	August 16, 2022
The girls mourn the loss of Obsidian while the boys complain that Vermeil stopped coming to class. Lilia meets Vermeil and says she doesn't care that she is a demon because she is not evil, plus she trusts Alto to reign her in if she loses control again. Vermeil returns to Alto's room and they reconcile and kiss. After slaughtering the inhabitants of a church, a warlock and witch named Iolite and Heliodor discuss Obsidian's failure and call him a fool, but his research was interesting and they will complete it. Vermeil changes into a school uniform that is a bit too small for her and joins Alto in class, to the perverted delight of the boys. The student council suddenly detains the two. Elena apologizes for not being able to help them during their battle against Obsidian and says Obsidian has escaped from prison. They suddenly hold Alto at swordpoint and demand the truth. With little choice, they confess that Vermeil is a demon and that their life forces are linked. Student council member Jessica wants to destroy Vermeil, but is shocked when Elena accepts this and agrees that Vermeil is not evil. Elena then invites Alto to join the student council.
8	"Selection"; Transliteration: "Senbetsu" (Japanese: 選別)	Chie Yamazaki; Matsuo Asami	Tetsuya Yamada	Masayoshi Nishida	August 23, 2022
Though suspicious of Elena's motives, Alto accepts her offer, making Lilia, Marx, and Cheryl proud. Vermeil later warns him that she suspects Elena is not human. The two attend a council meeting, but walk in on Elena, Chris, and Jessica changing clothes. Jessica freaks out, but Elena and Chris merely say it was their fault for not locking the door. Elena brings in a piece of the creature she fought. They examine it and find a magic they have never seen before. Meanwhile, Iolite and Heliodor meet the creature's master, Kohakumiya. Iolite angers her by revealing he killed someone he was supposed to recruit, then he and Heliodor leave to target Alto and Vermeil. Alto dreams of a child Vermeil crying in a ruined city, then a woman tells him to choose between helping humanity and bringing salvation, or helping Vermeil and bringing destruction. He wakes up and is nervous about the upcoming exam, so Vermeil kisses him to drain and then supercharge him. Students from all over the country show up to take the exam. The professor shows them a crystal ball with a flame inside and says they must pour their mana into the flame to strengthen it.
9	"The Mage of Heaven's Will"; Transliteration: "Shinmei no Majutsushi" (Japanese: 神命の魔術師)	Ryō Nakamura	Tetsuya Yamada	Masayoshi Nishida	August 30, 2022
Several students try, but cannot affect the flame and fail. Lilia realizes it is because they are focusing their mana on the crystal and not the flame; she easily makes the flame big. Cheryl and a student from another school also make the flame big, while Marx barely manages to affect it and pass. Alto is last; he realizes one can pour mana more easily by approaching the crystal from behind, but Vermeil encourages him to show off, so he pours his mana from the most difficult spot and makes the flame so big it shatters the crystal. He apologizes, but the professor says he passes. Alto and his friends have a picnic before the written exam and encourage each other. Vermeil pulls Alto into a hallway to kiss him, almost making him late. The student from the other school goes to the bathroom and complains about Alto showing off, but Iolite sneaks in and murders him before stealing his test ticket. Meanwhile, Elena and Jessica practice fencing. After Elena wins, they take a shower and discuss Alto and Vermeil. Jessica still cannot believe he summoned a demon, while Elena says they are obviously in love. Alto reaches the test room, but Vermeil has to wait outside. Iolite enters, sits next to Alto, and wishes him luck.
10	"Questions"; Transliteration: "Toikake" (Japanese: 問いかけ)	Matsuo Asami	Tetsuya Yamada	Kōji Hōri	September 6, 2022
Vermeil sits outside bored, but remembers how Alto promised to protect her. Alto freaks out when Iolite falls asleep as soon as the test starts, but concentrates on taking it. After a while, Iolite wakes up and writes super fast to finish the test in seconds, then mocks Alto for being slow. As the professor reprimands him for talking, a guard reports finding the body of the murdered student, then he realizes Iolite is not a student. Iolite says he only took the test for fun, then summons a stone golem to crush the professor's legs. As the students except Alto evacuate, Vermeil and the professor from the first exam show up. Guards drag a reluctant Lilia, Marx, and Cheryl out of the building, but when they try to reenter, a space warp sends them back outside. The golem withstands all their attacks and grabs Vermeil. Enraged, Alto explodes with power and shatters the golem, but Iolite summons more and impales his shoulder. Alto asks what he wants and he says his group aims to destroy the world with the help of demons. Vermeil goes into her monster form, but Iolite easily knocks her out. He tries to kill Alto, but the book he used to summon Vermeil shields him, then the woman from his dream appears. She says she is the memory of the Mage of the Beginning, the one who sealed Vermeil. Iolite tries to attack, but she freezes time and sends Alto into Vermeil's memories. He finds himself 550 years in the past and sees a child version of Vermeil happily playing.
11	"Past"; Transliteration: "Kako" (Japanese: 過去)	Matsuo Asami	Tatsuya Takahashi	Masayoshi Nishida	September 13, 2022
The Mage of the Beginning explains Vermeil was raised by a nun alongside the orphans Mielle, Lin, and Cait. They knew she was a demon but did not care. One day, the townspeople learned Vermeil was a demon and blamed her for a plague hitting the country, so they formed an angry mob and laid siege to the church. Mielle urged Vermeil to escape, and she almost made it out of town before she overheard the people saying they would kill her family. She ran back, but was too late; her family had been hanged. As the mob surrounded her, she lost her temper and went into her monster form for the first time, then killed everyone and burned the town to the ground. As Alto is appalled by what he had witnessed, the Mage says this was her crime and the reason why she was sealed. Alto finds he can interact with Vermeil and comforts her. She transforms into the adult Vermeil and cries that her crime can never be undone, but he says he does not care and kisses her. As they wake up in the real world, he declares he loves her.
12	"Together"; Transliteration: "Kasanariai" (Japanese: 重なり合い)	Takashi Naoya	Tatsuya Takahashi	Takashi Naoya	September 20, 2022
Iolite summons a huge golem and says Vermeil's only purpose is to destroy the world, but they tell him to shut up and combine their powers to destroy the golem. Heliodor appears and says she cannot maintain the space warp much longer, so she and Iolite escape through a portal. Vermeil identifies the Mage of the Beginning as Fatema. Fatema says Vermeil is her dear friend and urges Alto to care for her, then repairs the building before disappearing. Later, in an effort to become stronger so he can protect Vermeil, Alto is trained in fencing and martial arts by Jessica and Chris. He is easily defeated in spars due to lacking strength and experience, but aims to improve. In bed, Vermeil says she loves him too. In a student council meeting, Elena says they must work together to stop these attacks and they all agree. Lilia, Marx, and Cheryl receive their test results and they all passed, but when Alto doesn't show up, Lilia jealously suspects he is doing something with Vermeil. The two are indeed kissing in public, basking in their love and determined to protect each other.
