= Wakana Kuramochi =

Japanese voice actress

- 倉持 若菜
- Born: 10 April
- Occupation: Voice actress
- Years active: 2020–present
- Employer: Clare Voice
- Notable work: Am I Actually the Strongest? as Liza; Vermeil in Gold as Lilia Kudelfeyt; Liar, Liar as Sarasa Saionji; Reborn to Master the Blade: From Hero-King to Extraordinary Squire as Liselotte Arcia

Wakana Kuramochi (Japanese: 倉持 若菜, Hepburn: Kuramochi Wakana; born 10 April) is a Japanese voice actress from Gunma Prefecture, affiliated with Clare Voice. She is known for portraying Caph in The Duke of Death and His Maid, Liza in Am I Actually the Strongest?, Lilia Kudelfeyt in Vermeil in Gold, Sharuto in Giant Beasts of Ars, Sarasa Saionji in Liar, Liar, and Liselotte Arcia in Reborn to Master the Blade: From Hero-King to Extraordinary Squire.

== Biography ==
Wakana Kuramochi, a native of Gunma Prefecture, was born on 10 April. She was educated at the Tokyo Narration Acting Institute and joined Clare Voice on 1 April 2020.

In 2020, Kuramochi made her voice acting debut, appearing in Love Live! Nijigasaki High School Idol Club. In May 2021, she was cast as Caph in The Duke of Death and His Maid, and she later reprised her role in the series' second season. In March 2022, she was cast as Lilia Kudelfeyt in Vermeil in Gold. In July 2022, she was cast as Liselotte Arcia in Reborn to Master the Blade: From Hero-King to Extraordinary Squire. In November 2022, she was cast as Sarasa Saionji in Liar, Liar. In December 2022, she was cast as Sharuto in Giant Beasts of Ars. In May 2023, she was cast as Liza in Am I Actually the Strongest?.

== Filmography ==
=== Anime television ===
2020

- Love Live! Nijigasaki High School Idol Club

2021

- The Duke of Death and His Maid, Caph
- Osamake, Takenaka
- SSSS.Dynazenon
- The Vampire Dies in No Time

2022

- Am I Actually the Strongest?, Liza
- Extreme Hearts, Miyabi Takao
- The Genius Prince's Guide to Raising a Nation Out of Debt
- Miss Shachiku and the Little Baby Ghost
- Vermeil in Gold, Lilia Kudelfeyt

2023

- Chronicles of an Aristocrat Reborn in Another World, Bela
- Giant Beasts of Ars, Sharuto
- Liar, Liar, Sarasa Saionji
- Reborn to Master the Blade: From Hero-King to Extraordinary Squire, Liselotte Arcia
- UniteUp!, Kyōko

2024

- The Elusive Samurai, Sakae

2025

- Catch Me at the Ballpark!, Kisa

2026

- Easygoing Territory Defense by the Optimistic Lord, Purriel

2027

- The Demons Are Planning Something Good!, Letze

=== Video games ===
- Ikki Gakuen

2025

- Atelier Yumia: The Alchemist of Memories & the Envisioned Land as Yumia Liessfeldt
