= Giant Beasts of Ars =

2023 Japanese anime television series

- Key visual

アルスの巨獣 (Arusu no Kyojū)
- Created by: DMM Pictures
- Anime television series
- Directed by: Akira Oguro
- Written by: Norimitsu Kaihō
- Music by: Shūji Katayama; Akinari Suzuki
- Studio: Asahi Production
- Licensed by: Sentai Filmworks: SA/SEA: Bilibili
- Original network: JNN (MBS, TBS), AT-X, BS NTV
- Original run: January 7, 2023 – March 25, 2023
- Episodes: 12
- Manga
- Written by: Toshinori Ito
- Published by: Kobunsha
- Magazine: Comic Nettai
- Original run: January 27, 2023 – March 25, 2024
- Volumes: 3

Giant Beasts of Ars (アルスの巨獣, Arusu no Kyojū) is an original Japanese anime television series animated by Asahi Production and produced by DMM Pictures. It is directed by Akira Oguro and written by Norimitsu Kaihō, with Shūji Katayama and Akinari Suzuki composing the music. Original character designs are provided by Ashito Ōyari, while Hiroshi Shimizu and Masato Kato adapt the designs for animation. It aired from January 7 to March 25, 2023, on the Super Animeism programming block on MBS and other affiliates. Penguin Research performed the opening theme song "Hengen Jizai" (変幻自在; "Morphing Existence"), while Harumi performed the ending theme song "Na mo Nai Hana" (名もない花; "The Nameless Flower"). Sentai Filmworks licensed the series outside of Asia. Bilibili licensed the series in Asia-Pacific and streams it on Ani-One YouTube channels. A manga adaptation by Toshinori Ito was serialized online via Kobunsha's Comic Nettai manga website from January 27, 2023, to March 25, 2024.

== Plot ==
In the world of Ars, humans and demihuman tribes (Hornarians, Mountaineers, Therianthropes, Marshlings, and Averians) lead a decades-long war against giant beasts that ravage the lands and feed on their resources. Those tasked with fighting them are champions called Paladins, who utilize the destructive power of Clerics: beings gifted with uncontrollable magical powers that can be channeled into a weapon. While mourning the death of his war partner Toka, former Paladin Jiro crosses paths with Kumi, a young woman who has just awakened her magical powers as a Cleric. After the pair form a contract to save the city from a giant beast attack, Jiro learns that Kumi has escaped a laboratory and is being hunted by the underlings of Mezami, the head of the research facility. Reluctantly agreeing to help Kumi flee from her pursuers, Jiro starts traveling with his new partner and her friend Myaa, a young girl who talks like a cat. As the unlikely trio wanders the Arsian lands, top officials begin setting their plans into motion—and the group of adventurers soon discover that men are to be feared more than monsters.

== Characters ==
Kumi (クウミ)
Voiced by: Hina Yōmiya
A young woman who is an experimental Cleric who escaped her laboratory and met Jiro and Myaa in a nearby city. When a beast attacked the city, she formed a pact with Jiro where he kissed her forehead, activating her powers into his weapon. She is very beautiful, kind, and has lavender hair. She likes food a lot, and is quite fond of Jiro, being disappointed the one-time kiss ritual was not recurring, getting jealous when Romana talked with Jiro, or defending him when people speak ill about him. She is the 22nd experimental Cleric Mezami created. After several experiments, a kind soldier named Zeke tries to save her, but to no avail and dies. However, he tells her that death is the end, and she should find the light in life. After this, she escapes the laboratory herself and eventually meets Myaa and Jiro.
Jiro (ジイロ)
Voiced by: Toshiyuki Morikawa
A former Paladin of the Empire. After losing his partner and Cleric Toka, he becomes a drunkard, taking random monster jobs as they come. He saved Kumi when her power was about to overflow and formed a pact with her, allowing them to defeat a beast that attacked the city. Initially distant and cold, he saves Kumi and Myaa when they were taken by the Empire and is very protective of Kumi. He is extremely strong, able to take down regular beasts without a Cleric. With Kumi, he can effortlessly dispatch "red-eyed" beasts, known to be the strongest and most abnormal. His weapon is a small dagger he can control and summon at will, no matter where it is. When he contracts with Kumi using his Paladin power, "Anthrovincia", the dagger turns into a spear, and Jiro's eyes and hair start to glow.
Myaa (ミャア)
Voiced by: Yu Serizawa
A merchant of sorts in the town where Jiro and Kumi met called a "Cat Chapeau". She is quite intelligent and tends to irritate Jiro. She has a cat on her head, and always speaks like a catgirl. She tends to tease Kumi and Jiro about their developing relationship, calling Kumi his bride and whatnot. There are other Chapeau's she can communicate with, such as dog, lion, and chicken. All the Chapeau's are similar to representatives for each tribe/region, and can communicate with each other from long distances. She controls a large ship the group use to travel and combat beasts.
Meran (メラン)
Voiced by: Hiromu Mineta
A young demihuman kid from a Therianthrope village the group stops by. He's very kind and aspires to be a Paladin. However, his elders think he is too nice, and needs to experience the world before he can become one. After Jiro saves him from a beast, he tries to repay his debt by helping him. Eventually, he joins the group so he can learn from Jiro and experience the world.
Romana (ロマーナ)
Voiced by: Yoko Hikasa
A traveling herbalist who used to be a combat medic. She meets Kumi helping out in a tavern and thinks Jiro is a slave trader trying to sell her. As such, she flirts with him and tricks him into gambling away all of his money. She eventually asks him to gamble Kumi, but he refuses and offers his dagger. Kumi says he can't as it's important to him, and Romana sees she misunderstood the situation. She dislikes Paladins as most abuse their Clerics and don't fight nobly. However, this opinion changes once she sees Jiro in action and what others, notably Kumi, say about him. She also joins the group on the premise of Jiro owing her money from gambling. In reality, she's quite fond of the group, especially Kumi.
Tsurugi (ツルギ)
Voiced by: Asami Seto
A general of the Empire. She used to be one of Jiro's and Facade's comrades, and worked her way up via promotions. She wanted to get promoted to gain a high rank and end the war so she could live a quiet life in the country, but quickly realizes that men are scarier than beasts. She's suspicious of Bakla's plans and Mezami's experiments, and tries to stop them. Zen works for her, and sends her reports on Bakla's plans.
Sharuto (シャルト)
Voiced by: Wakana Kuramochi
Façade (ファザード, Fazādo)
Voiced by: Ryōta Takeuchi
One of Jiro's former comrades. He seemingly lost his memories due to Mezami's experiments, and now works for Bakla with one of Mezami's experimental clerics. He was created to be a Paladin that doesn't need a Cleric to use his powers. His mission is to attack the other species' villages to assert dominance for the Empire. He works with another prototype Cleric like Kumi, who is far more emotionless than her.
Tōka (トオカ)
Voiced by: Mayu Aoyagi
Jiro's previous Cleric and wife. He deeply cared for her, and was depressed after her death. She was a Hornarian, and was very knowledgeable in combat, helping Jiro combat beasts more effectively. Her hobby was drawing. On a mission with Facade, they run into extremely powerful humanoid beasts that can talk. She sacrifices herself by overloading her power to save Jiro.
Zen (ゼン)
Voiced by: Kenichi Ogata
Mezami (メザミ)
Voiced by: Atsushi Tamaru
A scientist that works under Bakla. He created prototype Clerics such as Kumi, as well as prototype Paladins such as Facade, who don't need a Cleric to use their power. The goal of the Clerics were similar to suicide bombers: to create emotionless ones that could release their full power, which would cause an explosion that could take out a city. He looks down on beasts, other demihuman species (called "barbarians" aka the tribes), and even normal humans, thinking they are no more than tools or test subjects. He believes all barbarians and beasts should be eradicated.
Bakla (バクラ)
Voiced by: Takayuki Sugō
A higher-up of the Empire with nefarious plans. He uses Mezami and his experiments to exert power over the other demihuman species' so that the Empire has control over them all. He has little to no morals, and views beasts and other species as "pets" to control and tame.
Kuumi Katsu (勝 クウミ, Katsu Kūmi)
Voiced by: Akeno Watanabe
Baban (ババン)
Voiced by: Takahiro Shimada
One of Jiro's friends from the Mountain village. He's extremely strong, and is a Paladin himself.
Baban's wife (ババン妻, Baban Tsuma)
Voiced by: Mai Nakahara
Baban's wife. She's his Cleric, and very kind. She's much smaller than Baban, as are all women of their village.
Kuryunesu (クリュネス)
Voiced by: Masaaki Mizunaka
Gouza (ゴウザ, Gōza)
Voiced by: Motomu Kiyokawa
Guun (グウン, Gūn)
Voiced by: Kenji Nomura
Kirisu (キリス)
Voiced by: Kanato Watai

== Episode list ==
| No. | Title | Directed by (Note: Information is taken from the ending credits of each episode.) | Storyboarded by | Original release date |
|---|---|---|---|---|
| 1 | "The Promise That Started It All"; Transliteration: "Hajimari no Yakusoku" (Japanese: はじまりの約束) | Tadato Suzuki | Akira Oguro | January 7, 2023 (Note: This episode aired at 1:55 a.m. JST, 30 minutes after the original air time.) |
| 2 | "The Covenant Ritual"; Transliteration: "Keiyaku no Gishiki" (Japanese: 契約の儀式) | Takahiro Ōtsuka | Akira Oguro | January 14, 2023 |
| 3 | "Long Rain Village"; Transliteration: "Rin'u no Sato" (Japanese: 霖雨の里) | Shigeru Ueda | Shigeru Ueda | January 21, 2023 |
| 4 | "The Drifting Spear"; Transliteration: "Samayo U'yari" (Japanese: 彷徨う槍) | Takaaki Ishiyama | Hiroshi Aoyama | January 28, 2023 |
| 5 | "Test of Strength"; Transliteration: "Chikara Kurabe" (Japanese: 力比べ) | Masayuki Iimura | Akira Oguro | February 4, 2023 |
| 6 | "An Inescapable Shadow"; Transliteration: "Nogarerarenu Kage" (Japanese: 逃れられぬ影) | Masato Suzuki, Aoi Mori | Masato Suzuki, Aoi Mori | February 11, 2023 |
| 7 | "Violet Evokes the Memory of Horns"; Transliteration: "Murasaki wa Tsuwa no Kioku" (Japanese: ムラサキは角の記憶) | Takahiro Ōtsuka | Akira Oguro | February 18, 2023 |
| 8 | "Proof of Identity"; Transliteration: "Dōitsusei no Shōmei" (Japanese: 同一性の証明) | Shigeru Ueda | Akira Oguro | February 25, 2023 |
| 9 | "The Warrior and the Healer"; Transliteration: "Samurai to Ikutōtsukushi" (Japanese: 士と医生) | Takaaki Ishiyama | Masato Suzuki, Aoi Mori, Hironori Izu, Ririka Yamazaki | March 4, 2023 |
| 10 | "The Emissary of the Securians"; Transliteration: "Moribito no Shisha" (Japanese: 守り人の使者) | Masayuki Iimura | Akira Oguro | March 11, 2023 (Note: This episode aired at 2:50 a.m. JST, 1 hour and 25 minutes after the original air time due to the 2023 World Baseball Classic coverage extension.) |
| 11 | "The Fleeting Flower"; Transliteration: "Utaka no Hana" (Japanese: 泡沫の華) | Masato Suzuki | Masato Suzuki, Aoi Mori | March 18, 2023 (Note: This episode aired at 1:30 a.m. JST, 5 minutes after the original air time.) |
| 12 | "The Ring's Judgment"; Transliteration: "Yubiwa no Shinpan" (Japanese: 指輪の審判) | Takahiro Ōtsuka | Akira Oguro | March 25, 2023 |
