= Haruka Shiraishi =

Japanese voice actress (born 1995)

- 白石 晴香
- Born: April 8, 1995 (age 31); Tokyo, Japan
- Occupations: Actress; voice actress
- Years active: 2007–present
- Agent: Toy's Factory
- Notable work: Golden Kamuy as Asirpa; A.I.C.O. -Incarnation- as Aiko Tachibana; We Never Learn as Fumino Furuhashi; Peach Boy Riverside as Saltherine Aldarake; High-Rise Invasion as Yuri Honjō; World's End Harem as Mira Suō and Elisa Tachibana; The Eminence in Shadow as Rose Oriana; High Card as Wendy Sato; My One-Hit Kill Sister as Maya Ikusaba
- Height: 158 cm (5 ft 2 in)

Haruka Shiraishi (白石 晴香, Shiraishi Haruka; born April 8, 1995) is a Japanese actress who specializes in voice acting. A former member of Hirata Office, she currently works at Toy's Factory.

== Biography ==
She starred in Goro Miyazaki's anime film From Up on Poppy Hill.

== Filmography ==
=== Television ===
- Kakko Kawaii Senken! (2012), Class President, Risu, Tori
- Sengoku Collection (2012), Yoshitsugu Ōtani
- Glass no Kamen Desu ga (2013), Ayumi Himekawa
- My Teen Romantic Comedy SNAFU (2013), Mori
- Ronja, the Robber's Daughter (2014), Ronja
- Mushishi: The Next Chapter (2014), Masumi
- Himouto! Umaru-chan (2015–2017), Kirie Motoba
- Anne Happy (2016), Ruri "Hibari" Hibarigaoka
- Action Heroine Cheer Fruits (2017), Kanon Shimura
- A Centaur's Life (2017), Kyōko Naraku
- Tsuki ga Kirei (2017), Aoi Takizawa
- Golden Kamuy (2018–present), Asirpa
- Uchi no Maid ga Uzasugiru! (2018), Misha Takanashi
- Anima Yell! (2018), Kana Ushiku
- That Time I Got Reincarnated as a Slime (2019), Alice
- We Never Learn (2019), Fumino Furuhashi
- Cinderella Nine (2019), Kana Tsukumo
- Oresuki (2019), Aoi "Himawari" Hinata
- Tenka Hyakken ~Meiji-kan e Yōkoso!~ (2019), Nanaka
- Healin' Good Pretty Cure (2020), Latte, Hamtus
- Sakura Wars: The Animation (2020), Leyla M. Ruzhkova
- The Misfit of Demon King Academy (2020), Nono Inota
- Dropout Idol Fruit Tart (2020), Hayu Nukui
- WIXOSS Diva(A)Live (2021), Rei Sakigake
- 86 (2021), Kaie Tanya
- Peach Boy Riverside (2021), Sally/Saltherine Aldarake
- World's End Harem (2021–2022), Mira Suō, Elisa Tachibana
- The Strongest Sage With the Weakest Crest (2022), Alma
- Akebi's Sailor Uniform (2022), Mai Togano
- Shinobi no Ittoki (2022), Kōsetsu
- The Eminence in Shadow (2022), Rose Oriana
- Play It Cool, Guys (2022), Momo Momosaki
- Mobile Suit Gundam: The Witch from Mercury (2022), Nika Nanaura (episode 10 - 12)
- High Card (2023–2024), Wendy Satō

- Reborn to Master the Blade: From Hero-King to Extraordinary Squire (2023), Eris
- The Angel Next Door Spoils Me Rotten (2023-2026), Chitose Shirakawa
- My One-Hit Kill Sister (2023), Maya Ikusaba
- Dead Mount Death Play (2023), Saki Aikawa
- Helck (2023), Isuta
- Classroom for Heroes (2023), Yessica
- Mushoku Tensei: Jobless Reincarnation 2 (2023), Sara
- Scott Pilgrim Takes Off (2023), Anime Girl
- 'Tis Time for "Torture," Princess (2024), Princess
- Metallic Rouge (2024), Cyan Bluestar
- Bartender: Glass of God (2024), Yukari Higuchi
- The Idolmaster Shiny Colors (2024), Chiyoko Sonoda
- Why Does Nobody Remember Me in This World? (2024), Jeanne
- Tying the Knot with an Amagami Sister (2024), Makoto Takeda
- Loner Life in Another World (2024), Class Rep
- Is It Wrong to Try to Pick Up Girls in a Dungeon? V (2024), Horn
- Let This Grieving Soul Retire! (2024), Lapis Fulgor
- Blue Box (2024), Karen Moriya
- I Want to Escape from Princess Lessons (2025), Leticia
- The Red Ranger Becomes an Adventurer in Another World (2025), Raniya
- Kowloon Generic Romance (2025), Reiko Kujirai
- The Shiunji Family Children (2025), Nao Hinata
- Clevatess (2025), Alicia Glenfall
- Scooped Up by an S-Rank Adventurer! (2025), Silica
- The Shy Hero and the Assassin Princesses (2025), Goa Minagawa
- Hotel Inhumans (2025), Nina
- Dusk Beyond the End of the World (2025), Ajisai
- A Star Brighter Than the Sun (2025), Subaru Kamishiro
- Ninja vs. Gokudo (2025), Yuri
- An Adventurer's Daily Grind at Age 29 (2026), Cocko
- Champignon Witch (2026), Luna
- High School! Kimengumi (2026), Yui Kawa
- Marriagetoxin (2026), Akari Gero
- Petals of Reincarnation (2026), A. Einstein
- The Classroom of a Black Cat and a Witch (2026), Io Taurus
- The Oblivious Saint Can't Contain Her Power (2026), Flora
- From Overshadowed to Overpowered (2026), Marin
- Kaiju Girl Caramelise (2026), Raimu Kono
- The Frontier Lord Begins with Zero Subjects (2026), Aihan
- Even the Student Council Has Its Holes! (2026), Hisako Kotobuki
- Even Though I'm a Super Timid Noble Girl, I Accepted the Bet from My Cunning Fiancé (2026), Amelia Keys
- Reborn as a Space Mercenary: I Woke Up Piloting the Strongest Starship! (2026), Serena Holz
- The Final-Boss Prince Is Somehow Obsessed with the Chubby Villainess: Reincarnated Me (2027), Celine
- Witch and Mercenary (2027), Elicia Armel
- The Demons Are Planning Something Good! (2027), Merisha

=== Original net animation ===
- A.I.C.O. -Incarnation- (2018), Aiko Tachibana
- High-Rise Invasion (2021), Yuri Honjō
- Yu-Gi-Oh! Card Game: The Chronicles (2025), Hiita
- Devils' Crest (2026), Yuma Ashihara

=== Original video animation ===
- Oresuki: Oretachi no Game Set (2020), Aoi "Himawari" Hinata
- Code Geass: Rozé of the Recapture (2024), Mei Ema
- Yu-Gi-Oh! Card Game The Chronicles (2025), Hiita

=== Film ===
- From Up on Poppy Hill (2011), Sora Matsuzaki
- Glass no Kamen Desu ga Onna Spy no Koi! Murasaki no Bara wa Kiken na Kaori!? (2013), Ayumi Himekawa
- When Marnie Was There (2014), Miyoko
- Cyborg 009 VS Devilman (2015), Cyborg 001/Ivan Whisky
- Flavors of Youth (2018), Lulu
- Blue Thermal (2022), Yukari Muroi
- Fureru (2024), Juri Kamozawa

=== Video games ===
- Himouto! Umaru-chan: Himōto! Ikusei Keikaku (2015), Kirie Motoba
- Racing Musume (2015), Asuna Ban
- Yome Collection (2016), Kirie Motoba
- Girl Friend Beta (2017), Fuuka Mizuno
- Schoolgirl Strikers (2018), Sui Hayasaka
- The Idolmaster Shiny Colors (2018–present), Chiyoko Sonoda
- Azur Lane (2018), Le Malin, Agano, Blücher
- Alice Gear Aegis (2018), Nina Kalinina
- Another Eden (2019), Veina
- Girls' Frontline (2020), Steyr ACR & VHS
- Arknights (2020), Iris
- League of Legends (2022), Zeri
- Honkai Impact 3rd (2022), Aponia
- Massage Freaks (2022), Shiho Asagiri
- Path to Nowhere (2022), Anne
- Goddess of Victory: Nikke (2022), Folkwang, Rupee
- Lackgirl I (2022), Izumi
- 404 Game Re:set (2022), Virtua Racing
- Umamusume: Pretty Derby (2023), Neo Universe
- Echocalypse (2023), Cera, Lilith
- TEVI (2023), Erina, Mia
- Zenless Zone Zero (2023), Grace Howard
- The Hundred Line: Last Defense Academy (2025), Kyoshika Magadori
- Arknights: Endfield (2026), Last Rite
- Fatal Frame II: Crimson Butterfly Remake (2026), Mayu Amakura
- Genshin impact (2026), Linnea
- Nekopara: Sekai Connect (2026), Chamoe

=== Dubbing ===
==== Live-action ====
- Everything I Know About Love, Maggie
- Find Me in Paris, Thea Raphael
- Enola Holmes, Enola Holmes
- Kingdom of the Planet of the Apes, Soona

==== Animation ====
- Finding Dory, Abbey
