= KingBonn Award =

- Location: Shenzhen, China
- Language: International
- Website: www.kingbonn.cc

KingBonn Award (Chinese: 金鹏奖) of China International New Media Short Film Festival is the only state-recognized international short film award in China, which is comprised by Main Competition Section and Internet Voting Section. As one of the principal activities in the festival, creators of short films from home and abroad come to participate in the competition. Domestic and international cinema professionals, scholars, and noted directors participate in the panel to review the candidate's shorts. They select ones to reward in form of bonuses, with the goal of encouraging the production of outstanding new media shorts, and of discovering and supporting talents.

== KingBonn Award ==
The name of the KingBonn Award is derived from the abbreviated name of Shenzhen City – Pengcheng (Chinese Pinyin, literally meaning "the city of roc"). KingBonn implies that the new media movie-TV-animation industry will thrive and soar.

== CSFF ==
China International New Media Short Film Festival (CSFF), founded by 2010, is the only state-recognized international short film award in China, with approval from the Publicity Department of the CPC Central Committee, co-sponsored by State General Administration of Press and Publication, Radio, Film and Television and Shenzhen Municipal People's Government and hosted by Culture, Sports & Tourism Administration of Shenzhen Municipality and Shenzhen Media Group, which is held annually in May during the China (Shenzhen) International Cultural Industries Fair. The major activities be divided into six sections: KingBonn Award Competition, KingBonn Award Ceremony, International Short Film Screenings, New Media Short Forum, New Media Short Film Market and KingBonn Short Film Outdoor Screening Carnival in Guangming. The China International New Media Short Film Festival is intended to encourage the production of outstanding new media shorts, discover and support new media talents, nurture and incubate innovative new media projects.

== KingBonn Award Ceremony ==
KingBonn Award Ceremony, as the unique platform for KingBonn Award result announcement, is one of the most ceremonious activities, which will be live telecasted globally by the Shenzhen Media Group Channels and the domestic mainstream online video networks.

== Awards Setting ==
The three main categories of entries accepted by KingBonn Award include fiction, animation and documentary shorts which should be less than 20 minutes and completed after January 1 of the previous one year and are not previously submitted to the KingBonn Award. One selection is held per year.

=== Main Competition Section ===
- Best KingBonn Short Film
- Best Fiction
- Best Documentary
- Best Animation
- Best Director
- Best University Student MicroFilm

=== Internet Competition Section ===
- Best Internet Short Film
- Best Comedy
- Best Handset Short Film

== International Jury Panel of KingBonn Award Selection ==
The 1st KingBonn Award (2010)

President: Xiaogang FENG (China)
Members:Chris Edward (USA), Royston TAN (Singapore), Juan WEN (HongKong, China), Weijiang WANG (Tawan, China), Nishimura Junji (Japan), Yumin MA (China)

The 2nd KingBonn Award (2011)
President: Chuan LU (China)

Members: Roger Gonin (France), Gunter Grossholz (Germany), Weijiang WANG (Tawan, China), Renzhong HUANG (China), Haicheng ZHAO (China), Guochang LIU (HongKong, China), Jianying GONG (China)

The 3rd KingBonn Award (2012)
President: Xiaoshuai WANG (China) Members: Richard L.Anderson (USA), Zita Carvalhosa (Brazil), Pavel Jech (Czech), Tianming LU (China), Xingguo LI (China), Lijun SUN (China)

The 4th KingBonn Award (2013)

President: Chuan LU (China)
Members: David Freeman (USA), Herman Van Eyken (Australia), Steve Solot (Brazil), Xiangzhong LIAO (China), Bing ZHOU (China), Dasheng ZHENG (China), Xuebing WANG (China), Ze WANG (China)

The 5th KingBonn Award (2014)
President: QuanAn WANG (China)

Members: Richard Taylor (New Zealand), Jacques Cluzaud (France), Marta Etura (Spain), Konstantin Bronzit (Russia), Ban WANG (China), Lu HUANG (China)

The 6th KingBonn Award (2015)
President: Peter CHAN (Hong Kong, China) Members: Hong TAO (China), Carter Pilcher (UK), David K.Irving (USA), Royston TAN (Singapore), Xiangzhong LIAO (China), William FENG (China)

== Award Lists ==
=== The 1st China International (KingBonn) New Media Short Film Festival ===
Awards	Awarded Short Film	Director
Best KingBonn Short Award	The Opposite Shore (河龙川岗)	Ao SHEN (China)
Best New Technology Creativity	Moon Rabbit (月神)	Jianyuan XIE (China)
Best Director Award	Ostkreuz	Laura Geiger, Tom Kretschmer (Germany)
The Best Scriptwriter	Volltreffer/Direct Hit	Peter Dieterich (Germany)
Jury Panel's Special Innovation Awards	The Funk	Chris Jones (Australia)
Jury Panel's Special Innovation Awards	Hong (树上的鸡)	Jianle HUANG (China)
Jury Panel's Special Innovation Awards	The Unbearable Heaviness of Nagging	CHOI, Jeong Yeol (Korea)
Jury Panel's Special Innovation Awards	Noodles	Jordon Federman (France)
Jury Panel's Special Innovation Awards	Summer Sunday	Fred Breinersdorfer, Sigi Kamm (Germany)
Jury's Award	See through (打，打个大西瓜)	Yu YANG (China)

=== The 2nd China International (KingBonn) New Media Short Film Festival ===
Awards	Awarded Short Film	Director
Best KingBonn Short Award	Yuri Lennon's Landing on Alpha 46	Anthony Vouardoux (Germany)
Best Fiction Award	First Kiss (初吻)	Qi QIU (China)
Best Documentary Award	The Train of Flies	Jon Garano (Spain)
Best Animation Award	I Am Brave (我很勇敢)	Unicellular studio (China)
The Best Animation Image	Sunshine Girl	Jong-Wook, Yoon (Korea)
Best Director Award	Temple Rider (奇庙单车游)	Joe Kwun, Miles Cheng (Hong Kong, China)
The Best Scriptwriter	Playing with the Death	Paul Urkijo Alijo (Spain)
The Best Cinematography	The Most Beautiful	PARK Jae-hyung, LEE Jong-Yeol (Korea)
Best Series	Kungfu Bunny Series Films (功夫兔系列)	Zhiyong LI (China)
Jury's Award	Grandpa (爷爷)	Lu DING (China)
The Best Internet Serial Shorts	钱多多嫁人记	Miaojing GUO (From TV.sohu.com)

=== The 3rd China International (KingBonn) New Media Short Film Festival ===
Awards	Awarded Short Film	Director
Best KingBonn Short Award	Land of the Heroes	Sahim Omar Kalifa (Belgium)
Best Fiction Award	Raju	Max Zahle (Germany)
Best Documentary Award	Out of reach	Jakub Stozek (Poland)
Best Animation Award	Pig Sale (卖猪)	Xifeng CHEN (China)
Best Director Award	Goodbye Daddy	Sandra Nedeleff (Germany)
The Best Internet Serial Shorts	Hip Hop Office Quartet Season 4 (嘻哈四重奏第4季)	Zhengyu LU (China)
Jury's Award	A Day	Han Jae-bin (Korea)
Best Handset Short Film	Dream Journey (梦之旅)	Weiyi LI (From V.QQ.Com)
Best Internet Short Film	Crash (倒鸭子)	Xiang GU (From Tudou.com & Youku.com)
Internet Popularity Awards	The Brave Tin Soldier (坚定的锡兵)	Xuebing WANG (From TV.sohu.com)

=== The 4th China International (KingBonn) New Media Short Film Festival ===
Awards	Awarded Short Film	Director
Best KingBonn Short Award	Seven Minutes in the Warsaw Ghetto	Johan Oettinger (Denmark)
Best Director Award	Emily	Benjamin Mathews (Australia)
Best Fiction Award	Jacobo	David del Aguila (Spain)
Best Documentary Award	Coal Miner (另一个世界)	Zongfu GUO (China)
Best Animation Award	Romance	Georges Schwizgebel (Switzerland)
Best Comedy	Counting Happiness	Venetia Evripiotou (Greece)
Jury's Award	The Home Gleaners (拾荒少年)	Siqing ZHANG (China)
Jury's Award	The Death Row	Maryam Ebrahimi (Sweden)
Best Internet Short Film	I'm Not Drunk (不醉人生)	Bo HUANG (From Youku.com)
The Best Internet Serial Shorts	Secret Angel (秘密天使)	Yun ZHAO (From TV.sohu.com)
Best Handset Short Film	Tarot (塔罗)	Qishun SUN (From TV189.com)
Best Microfilm	Cast (表演课堂)	November (From LeTV.com)

=== The 5th China International (KingBonn) New Media Short Film Festival ===
Awards	Awarded Short Film	Director
Best KingBonn Short Award	Curfew	Shawn Christensen (USA)
Best Director Award	Butter Lamp (酥油灯)	Hu Wei (China)
Best Fiction Award	Baghdad Messi	Sahim Omar Kalifa (Belgium)
Best Documentary Award	Country Teacher (乡村教师)	Gao Jun; Gao Hong (China)
Best Animation Award	The Eagle and the Chickens (鹰与鸡)	TianYesu, Huang Jing, Geng Jiexi (China)
Jury's Award	One Dimension (一维)	Lü Yue (China)
Best Series	The Unthinkable Part II (万万没想到之小兵过年)	Show Joy (China)
Best Internet Short Film	Hammer Wong-The Actor of The Unthinkable (万万没想到之演员王大锤)	Show Joy (From Youku.com)
Best Handset Short Film	Parent-Child Time (亲子时间)	Marriott Xiaohuang (From Tudou.com)
Best Comedy	Mr Wen & Mr Yuan (Mr蚊&Mr原)	Junhao LIN (From Tudou.com)
Best Microfilm	Reunion Dinner of ¥60 六十元的年夜饭	Feng NIU (From Sohu.com)

=== The 6th China International (KingBonn) New Media Short Film Festival ===
Awards	Awarded Short Film	Director
Best KingBonn Short Award	GYGES (盲钻)	Wenchao HE (China)
Best Fiction Award	GYGES (盲钻)	Wenchao HE (China)
Best Documentary Award	Collecting is a Disease	Kuba Szutkowski (Netherlands)
Best Animation Award	We can't live without cosmos	Konstantin Bronzit (Russia)
Best Director Award	Spring Officer (春官)	Yansong YU (China)
ZTE VPclub Best University Student Micro Film	Return to prairie (回草原)	Liqi YI (China)
Best Internet Short Film	Love Flower (小红花)	Zhanfeng YI, Xuede SONG (From TV.sohu.com)
Best Comedy	Crazy kids (小明和他的小伙伴们)	Zhiting LI (From Iqiyi.com)
Best Handset Short Film	Child and Granny's Dancing (让奶奶带孩子的下场)	Lirong SI (From Tudou.com)
Best Documentary Award	Collecting is a Disease	Kuba Szutkowski (Netherlands)
Best Animation Award	We can't live without cosmos	Konstantin Bronzit (Russia)
