= Jiaoshou Yi Xiaoxing =

Chinese Internet celebrity

- Born: Yi Zhenxing; 15 June 1984 (age 42); Yueyang, China
- Education: Changsha University of Science and Technology
- Occupations: Cyber-celebrity, screenwriter and director
- Years active: 2006-present
- Agent: 北京万合天宜影视文化有限公司
- Notable work: Surprise
- Awards: China Ceremony Short Film Award for Best Screenwriter; 5th Taipei International Short Film Festival Award for Best Plot

Yi Zhenxing (Chinese: 易振兴, born 15 July 1984, English name: Show Joy), better known by his online name Jiaoshou Yi Xiaoxing (Chinese: 叫兽易小星), is a Chinese Internet celebrity, screenwriter and director. He is one of the creators of media film company UniMedia.

In 2013, he directed Great Village Girl (Mandarin Pronunciation 大村姑), winning Best Screenplay in the One Foundation Video Festival and 5th Taipei International Short Film Festival Award for Best Plot.

His stream drama Surprise S1 (2013) and Surprise S2 (2014) were widely viewed and garnered positive reception, according to online platforms and viewer metrics.

He directed a comedy film in the same name Surprise (2015).

== Career ==
=== 2012-2013 ===
In February 2012, he directed the short film Invisible Girl-friend, adapted from popular online discussions; in July 2012, he participated in a motivational film Great Village Girl (Mandarin Pronunciation 大村姑) as a director, and win China Ceremony Short Film Award for Best Screenwriter and 5th Taipei International Short Film Festival Award for Best Plot; then in the October the same year, he directed a short film Call Me Dad, which depicts the story of a daughter and her father who reconnect after his return home following years of living in Beijing; in December 2012, he also directed a short film Release Wand.

=== 2013-2015 ===
In 2014, his stream drama Surprise S1 (2013) won the KingBonn Award for Best Series and Best Internet Short Film, and the other stream drama Surprise S2 (2014) achieved total 6 hundred million hits.

In September 2014, he published his book surprise: Life is Comedy.

In 2015, he directed short film Surprise: At a Crucial Moment in February and guested on Moron Brothers 3 in December.

=== 2015-present ===
In December 2015, his first film Surprise was released.

In March 2016, he was selected in the top 6 of China's Cyber-celebrity Ranking in 2015.

== Filmography ==
=== Film (Directed) ===
Year	Title	Role
2012	Invisible Girl-friend; Release Wand; Call Me Dad;Great Village Girl; Run! Cockroach 看不见的女朋友；释魔杖；叫我爸爸；大村姑；小强快跑	Director; Screenwriter
2013	Old Fighter; Surprise S1 老斗士；万万没想到第一季	Director; Executive Director
2014	Surprise S2 万万没想到第二季	Director
2015	Surprise: At a Crucial Moment 万万没想到：千钧一刻	Director; Screenwriter
2015	Surprise 万万没想到：西游篇	Director; Screenwriter; Actor
2018	Flavors of Youth 詩季織々	Director

=== Film (Performed) ===
Year	Title	Role
2010	City Monkey 玩酷青春	Guest star
2015	Chronicles of the Ghostly Tribe 九层妖塔	Guest star
2015	Crazy New Year's EVE 一路惊喜	Li Dao
2015	Surprise 万万没想到：西游篇	Monk Sha
2016	Little Door Gods 小门神	Old Hu

=== Television ===
Year	Title	Role
2013	Surprise S1 万万没想到第一季	Monk Tang
2014	Surprise S2 万万没想到第二季	Monk Tang
2014	Surprise：New Year for Little Soldier 万万没想到：小兵过年	Zhu Geliang
2015	Moron Brothers 3 废柴兄弟3	Hacker Xiao Xing

=== Work (Produced) ===
Year	Title	Director
2013	Hi!Boss 报告老板	Liu Xunzimo
2014	Senior Knows 学姐知道	Ma Shige; Cheng Yinuo
2014	Tech Girl Meow 高科技少女喵	Liu Xunzimo
2015	DIRENJIE-The Famous Detective 名侦探狄仁杰	Zhi Zunyu

== Discography ==
=== Singles ===
Year	Title	Notes
2013	Still Surprise 还是没想到	Theme song of Surprise S1
2013	Surprise 万万没想到	Theme song of Surprise S1
2015	Wan wan 万万	Theme song of Surprise
