= Surprise (2015 film) =

- Poster
- Chinese: 万万没想到
- Directed by: Show Joy
- Produced by: Lei Chen; Jianxin Huang; Wenwen Li; Meng Yu
- Starring: Bai Ke; Yang Zishan; Chen Bolin; Ma Tianyu; Liu Xunzimo; Mike Pirath Nitipaisankul; Show Joy
- Cinematography: Sung Fai Choi; Qiang Li
- Edited by: Yang Xiao
- Music by: Yasuharu Takanashi
- Production companies: Beijing WanheTianjin Media; Bona Film Group; Chinese Culture Shareholding; Hangzhou Guomai Media; Heyi Information Technology (Beijing); Heyi Pictures; Shanghai Sanciyuan Entertainment; Tianjin Maoyan Media; 上海亭东影业有限公司
- Distributed by: Bona Film Group
- Release date: 18 December 2015
- Running time: 96 minutes
- Country: China
- Language: Mandarin
- Box office: US$50.29 million

Surprise is a low-budget 2015 Chinese fantasy comedy film directed by Show Joy. It is based on a Youku web series of the same name by Show Joy but with a different content. It had wide previews on 12 and 13 December and was released on 18 December 2015.

== Plot ==
The movie tells the story of Wang Dachui (Bai Ke), a youth blessed with some magic powers who often dreams of being the chief demon of the Stone Ox Village. One day, he meets with a surprise, which happens to be the arrival of the Tang Sanzang (Chen Bolin) and his three disciples, and his life meets with an unexpected change.

As for Tang Sanzang and his three disciples, while they find Wang Dachui boring beyond explanation, a magical story of love and killing is about to unravel for both parties.

== Cast ==
- Bai Ke as Wang Dachui, the main protagonist of the movie.
- Yang Zishan as Su Xiaomei, Wang Dachui's love interest.
- Chen Bolin as Tang Sanzang
- Liu Xunzimo as Sun Wukong
- Mike Pirath Nitipaisankul as Zhu Bajie
- Show Joy as Sha Wujing
- Ma Tianyu as Murong Bai, Wang Dachui's love rival and a resident in the Stone Ox village.
- Eric Tsang as the Earth God (cameo)

== Reception ==
The film grossed US$17.5 million from previews on 12–13 December 2015. It grossed US$24 million on its opening weekend.
