= China International New Media Short Film Festival =

Short film festival in China

- Location: Shenzhen, China
- Website: www.csff.com.cn

China International New Media Short Film Festival (CSFF, Chinese: 中国国际新媒体短片节, official website: www.csff.com.cn), founded in 2010, is the only state-recognized international short film festival in China, co-sponsored by State Administration of Press and Publication, Radio, Film and Television and Shenzhen Municipal People's Government and hosted by Culture, Sports & Tourism Administration of Shenzhen Municipality and Shenzhen Media Group, which was held annually in May during the China (Shenzhen) International Cultural Industry Fair since 2010 until 2015. From 2016, the festival is celebrated independently and annual at the last weekend of November since then, approved by SAPPRFT, formerly known as SARFT. The major activities are divided into six sections: KingBonn Award Competition, KingBonn Award Ceremony, International Short Film Screenings, New Media Short Forum, New Media Short Film Market and KingBonn Short Film Outdoor Screening Carnival in Guangming New District, which is the main venue of the festival.

For their fifth event in 2015, the festival received 3,117 entries from 104 countries on five continents.
