= Haru Urara =

Japanese Thoroughbred racehorse (1996–2025)

Haru Urara ハルウララ
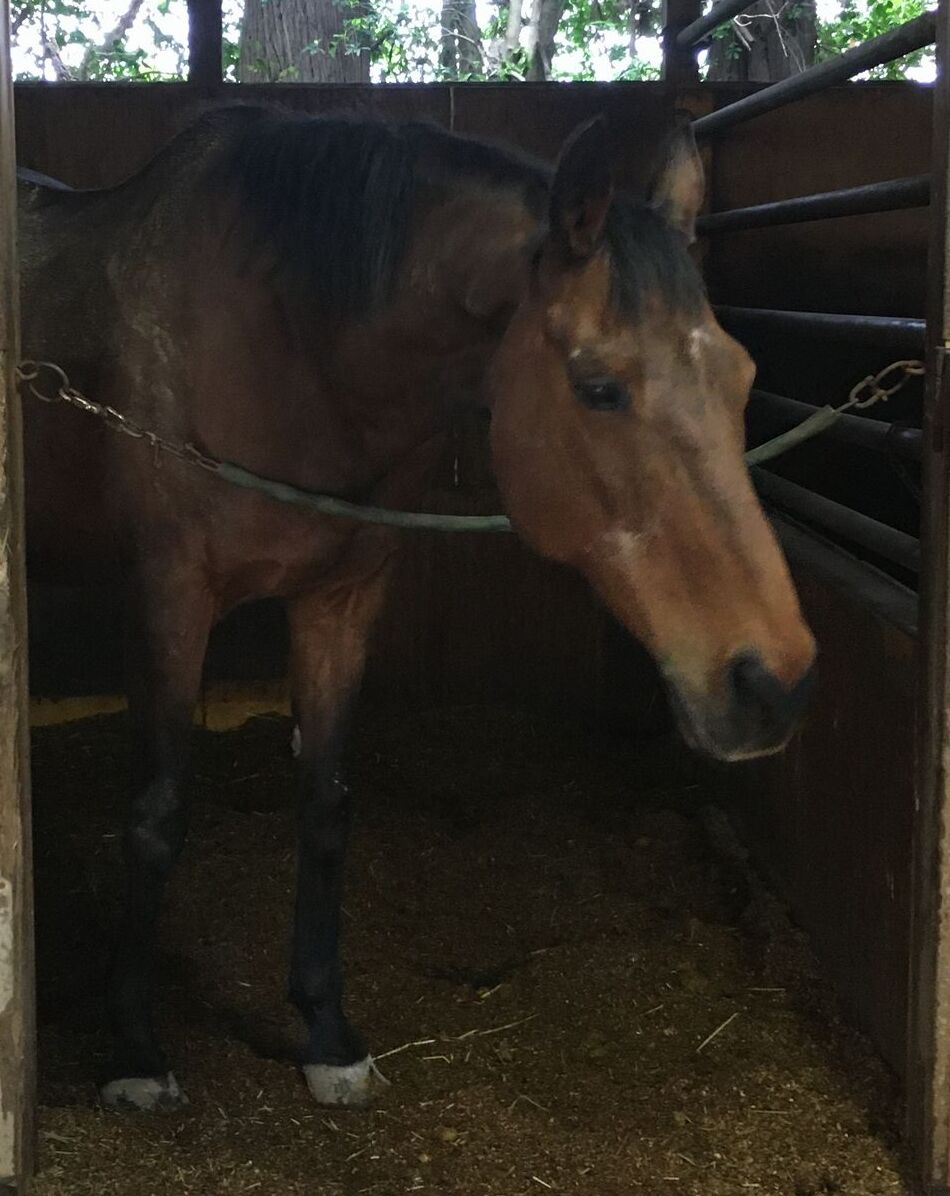
- Haru Urara in 2021.
- Breed: Thoroughbred
- Sire: Nippo Teio
- Grandsire: Lypheor
- Dam: Heroine
- Damsire: Lucky Sovereign
- Sex: Mare
- Foaled: February 27, 1996; Nobuta Bokujo, Utafue, Mitsuishi, Hokkaido, Japan
- Died: September 9, 2025 (aged 29); Matha Farm, Onjuku, Chiba, Japan
- Country: Japan
- Colour: Bay
- Breeder: Nobuta Bokujo
- Owner: Nobuta Bokujo; Takao Yokoyama; M A Office; Haru Urara no Kai
- Trainer: Dai Muneishi
- Jockey: Yutaka Take
- Record: 113: 0-5-7
- Earnings: ¥1,129,000

Haru Urara (Japanese: ハルウララ, Hepburn: Haru Urara; February 27, 1996 – September 9, 2025) was a Japanese Thoroughbred racehorse who achieved a record of zero wins and 113 losses in a career spanning from 1998 to 2004. Her unbroken losing streak was covered by Japanese media in 2003, causing her to achieve national popularity as a symbol of perseverance and tenacity.

== Background ==
Haru Urara, a bay mare, was foaled on February 27, 1996, on Nobuta Bokujo, Utafue, Mitsuishi, Hokkaido. She was sired by Nippo Teio, a top-class racehorse whose wins included the Autumn Tenno Sho and the Yasuda Kinen. Unable to find a buyer, the farm began training her as a racehorse.

== Racing career ==
At her debut on November 17, 1998, at the Kōchi Racetrack, Haru Urara lost, placing fifth –and last. Over the next four-and-a-half years, she would compete once or twice every month without winning.

In June 2003, after garnering her 80th consecutive loss, the story was picked up by the national Japanese media, making "Haru Urara" a household name. She quickly became very popular in Japan, and was called "the shining star of losers everywhere" (負け組の星, makegumi no hoshi), for continuing to run, despite her losing streak. This surge in popularity was dubbed "The Haru Urara Boom", and news about Haru Urara reached the international community.

During the boom, Haru Urara betting tickets began to be used as o-mamori, particularly for protection against traffic accidents: the word ataranai (当たらない) in Japanese can mean both "to lose a bet" and "to avoid being struck", so it was said that a Haru Urara betting ticket could protect the owner's car from being hit. In September 2003, the Kōchi Prefecture Horse Racing Association introduced a service wherein they would stamp the word on any betting ticket related to Haru Urara. O-mamori were also created from mane and tail hairs that were said to have fallen out during brushing, but production was soon halted, due to concerns expressed by animal welfare groups. They were instead replaced with wooden plaques.

At a race held on March 22, 2004, during the peak of her popularity, more than 13,000 spectators packed the Kochi Racetrack, 3,000 of whom had gathered outside before the gates opened, forcing the track to open 30 minutes earlier than scheduled. Some people waited in line for up to five hours to buy tickets at the "Haru Urara Commemorative Ticket Booth", which was established especially for the event. Fans bet a grand total of ¥121,751,200 on a Haru Urara victory, an impressive sum, particularly for a horse that had not won once in more than 100 attempts. Despite being ridden by Japan's premier jockey, Yutaka Take, Haru Urara earned her 106th consecutive loss, placing 10th among 11 horses running.

Her name means "Glorious Spring" or "Gentle Spring". Numerous products using Haru Urara's name or image have been produced, including stuffed toys, key rings, mobile phone straps, stickers, stamps, train tickets, rice, shochu, hats, T-shirts, and bras. A number of books and songs, as well as a film, were also written about Haru Urara during the boom period. The Japanese Prime Minister Junichiro Koizumi said "I'd like to see Haru Urara win, even just once. The horse is a good example of not giving up in the face of defeat."

Haru Urara ran her last race in August 2004 and retired with a record of 0 wins and 113 losses.

== Retirement and death ==
Originally, it was announced that Haru Urara would be returned from Tochigi where she was recuperating for a retirement race scheduled in March 2005. However, her return was soon postponed before officially being classified as retired by the NAR in October 2006, never returning to Kochi. Post retirement, there were plans to have her breed with Deep Impact as well as Stay Gold but those never materialized. Once those plans fell through, she was transported by her owner at the time in 2013 to the Matha Farm in Onjuku, Chiba Prefecture, where she lived until her death. At Matha Farm, Haru Urara became a minor PR character in 2018 when she was featured in a traffic safety poster of the Kisarazu Police Station.

On May 18, 2019, Haru Urara ran in the first "Soft Girls' Gathering", a time trial race for older horses with a GIII distance of 16.00 seconds. During her run, she achieved a time of 16.54 seconds and was put into first place, achieving victory and marking this as her very first win.

On September 8, 2025, Haru Urara became unwell and a veterinarian was called in. Haru Urara's condition only worsened overnight, and she died at Matha Farm, shortly after dawn on September 9 while surrounded by staff members. The cause was reported to be colic.

== In popular culture ==
An anthropomorphized version of Haru Urara appears as a character in the Japanese multimedia franchise Umamusume: Pretty Derby, voiced by Yukina Shuto. She is depicted as a petite, cheerful rose pink-haired girl who loves the simple thrill of racing, and never gives up despite of how often she ends up losing her races. Fans subsequently came to visit the real-life Haru Urara at Matha Farm.

In July 2025, a tweet telling readers about a website where they could donate ryegrass to her went viral, and resulted in the website receiving so many contributions that it temporarily went offline.

Biffy Clyro's 2021 album The Myth of the Happily Ever After features a track inspired by Haru Urara, sharing her name, written about optimism and joy in the face of failure.

After recording losing records in 39 consecutive tournaments, sumo wrestler Morikawa was given the ring name Moriurara by his coach, then ironically achieved his first winning record in his next tournament.

The Shining Star of Losers Everywhere on Vimeo
- The Shining Star of Losers Everywhere by The All-Nighter Room

In 2016, The Shining Star of Losers Everywhere an American documentary short film focusing on Haru Urara, was released. It was directed by Mickey Duzyj and has a runtime of 19 minutes. In Japan, it was screened in October 2016 at Kōchi University and Kochi Racecourse. The Japanese title given for the screening was "The Star of Losers, Haru Urara" (負け組の星、ハルウララ).

In 2026, a 15-minute musical based on the story of Haru Urara won the inaugural Making it Happen festival at The Theater Center in New York. The show was written by Ethan Riordan and Jeff Kasanoff.

== Racing record ==
The following racing form is based on information available on JBIS search and netkeiba.com.

Date	Racecourse	Race	Grade	Distance	Gate	Odds	Fav.	Fin.	Time	Margin	Jockey	Winner (Runner-Up)
1998 – three-year-old season
1998/11/17	Kochi	Three-Year-Olds 3		Dirt 1000m	3		3	5th	1:09.2	3.4	F.Furukawa	Gallopski
1998/12/13	Kochi	Three-Year-Olds 4		Dirt 1000m	1		6	5th	1:07.5	2.3	F.Furukawa	Easy Queen
1998/12/31	Kochi	Three-Year-Olds 4		Dirt 1000m	5		5	6th	1:08.7	3.4	S.Tokudome	Easy King
1999 – four-year-old season
1999/01/10	Kochi	Four-Year-Olds 4		Dirt 1300m	4		7	5th	1:31.9	2.8	S.Tokudome	Sweet King
1999/01/30	Kochi	Four-Year-Olds 4		Dirt 1300m	3		7	6th	1:32.9	2.9	S.Tokudome	Harima Ichimonji
1999/02/13	Kochi	Four-Year-Olds 4		Dirt 1300m	6		4	4th	1:29.9	1.1	S.Tokudome	Multi Iruseta
1999/02/27	Kochi	Four-Year-Olds 4		Dirt 1300m	5		2	3rd	1:27.4	0.4	Y.Tokudome	Tomino Chanel
1999/03/21	Kochi	Four-Year-Olds 3		Dirt 1300m	7		8	10th	1:27.1	2.5	T.Yamakita	Evlos Fit
1999/04/05	Kochi	Four-Year-Olds 4		Dirt 1300m	1		5	4th	1:29.1	1.0	Y.Tokudome	Nissei Rinden
1999/04/19	Kochi	Four-Year-Olds 4		Dirt 1300m	4		6	4th	1:26.6	1.1	Y.Tokudome	Wild Clover
1999/05/04	Kochi	Four-Year-Olds 4		Dirt 1300m	10		5	3rd	1:27.2	0.5	Y.Tokudome	Odaken Harmony
1999/05/22	Kochi	Four-Year-Olds 4		Dirt 1300m	6		1	5th	1:29.8	0.6	F.Furukawa	Tenju Noko
1999/06/19	Kochi	Four-Year-Olds 4		Dirt 1300m	6		7	6th	1:25.4	0.2	Y.Tokudome	Silver Touch
1999/07/10	Kochi	Four-Year-Olds 4		Dirt 1300m	1		7	6th	1:27.7	1.7	Y.Tokudome	Easy King
1999/08/07	Kochi	Four-Year-Olds 4		Dirt 1300m	3		8	8th	1:27.1	2.0	Y.Tokudome	Kanetoshi True Bs
1999/08/28	Kochi	Four-Year-Olds 4		Dirt 1300m	3		6	6th	1:26.7	2.6	Y.Tokudome	Eishin Malone
1999/09/06	Kochi	Four-Year-Olds 5		Dirt 1300m	4		5	5th	1:26.5	2.0	F.Furukawa	Laurel Sniper
1999/09/20	Kochi	C68		Dirt 1300m	1		7	7th	1:26.8	3.1	F.Furukawa	Daikou Angel
1999/10/04	Kochi	C68		Dirt 1300m	6		2	2nd	1:27.5	0.0	K.Imamura	Pot Man Dyna
1999/11/02	Kochi	C65		Dirt 1300m	4		5	6th	1:26.5	1.5	Y.Tokudome	Hana no Euro
1999/11/23	Kochi	C66		Dirt 1000m	7		6	7th	1:06.4	1.7	K.Imamura	Snark Sunrise
1999/12/19	Kochi	C67		Dirt 1300m	4		5	5th	1:28.0	2.0	K.Imamura	Kiyoraka Sparrow
1999/12/30	Kochi	C67		Dirt 1300m	3		5	4th	1:28.3	0.6	K.Imamura	Blue Wembley
2000 – five-year-old season
2000/01/16	Kochi	C68		Dirt 1300m	3		4	7th	1:28.5	2.2	K.Imamura	Safety Arrow
2000/02/07	Kochi	C67		Dirt 1300m	4		7	8th	1:27.7	3.2	H.Miyagawa	Kanetoshi Ability
2000/03/18	Kochi	C68		Dirt 1300m	8		6	4th	1:29.8	3.3	H.Miyagawa	Safety Arrow
2000/04/23	Kochi	C67		Dirt 1300m	6		7	5th	1:27.4	2.9	H.Miyagawa	Kane Mizuki
2000/04/29	Kochi	C62		Dirt 1300m	1		5	8th	1:28.1	4.1	H.Miyagawa	Judi Urban
2000/05/14	Kochi	C67		Dirt 1300m	8		6	7th	1:28.3	3.3	H.Miyagawa	Land Atlas
2000/06/12	Kochi	C66		Dirt 1300m	1		5	7th	1:25.6	3.6	K.Imamura	Bamboo Pino
2000/07/02	Kochi	C63		Dirt 1300m	3		5	6th	1:26.6	4.1	K.Imamura	Bamboo Pino
2000/07/16	Kochi	C63		Dirt 1300m	1		7	5th	1:27.2	1.8	K.Imamura	Golden Tolomeo
2000/08/07	Kochi	C65		Dirt 1300m	5		5	4th	1:27.6	1.6	K.Imamura	Golden Tolomeo
2000/08/28	Kochi	C64		Dirt 1300m	2		3	4th	1:28.5	2.9	H.Miyagawa	One For All
2000/09/16	Kochi	C63		Dirt 1300m	9		5	7th	1:25.8	3.2	H.Miyagawa	Strong Max
2000/09/30	Kochi	C63		Dirt 1300m	1		7	6th	1:27.9	2.9	H.Miyagawa	Strong Max
2000/10/16	Kochi	C64		Dirt 1300m	1		5	6th	1:30.0	2.0	Y.Ogata	Taiki Liberty
2000/11/04	Kochi	C63		Dirt 1300m	9		4	7th	1:29.3	3.6	Y.Ogata	Taiki Liberty
2000/11/26	Kochi	C62		Dirt 1300m	6		4	5th	1:29.4	3.1	S.Myojin	Inter Shark
2000/12/09	Kochi	C62		Dirt 1300m	3		6	8th	1:29.9	2.7	Y.Ogata	Inter Shark
2000/12/30	Kochi	C63		Dirt 1300m	2		4	8th	1:31.0	2.9	F.Furukawa	Golden Shake
2001 – six-year-old season
2001/01/22	Kochi	C64		Dirt 1300m	9		7	10th	1:31.1	5.6	F.Furukawa	Kona Sunset
2001/02/05	Kochi	C66		Dirt 1300m	6		5	6th	1:27.8	3.3	K.Imamura	Hama Okan
2001/02/25	Kochi	C64		Dirt 1300m	7		6	5th	1:30.8	2.9	K.Imamura	Eishin Caerleon
2001/03/11	Kochi	C64		Dirt 1300m	3		7	8th	1:30.3	2.6	F.Furukawa	Ibuki Cycle
2001/04/02	Kochi	E		Dirt 1300m	2		9	9th	1:30.7	3.8	Y.Ogata	Tosano Big
2001/04/23	Kochi	E		Dirt 1300m	8		5	8th	1:28.9	2.9	K.Imamura	Tribune
2001/05/05	Kochi	E		Dirt 1300m	2		6	9th	1:28.1	2.5	H.Miyagawa	Asakusa Tablet
2001/06/03	Kochi	E		Dirt 1300m	9		9	8th	1:29.3	3.5	K.Imamura	Gambarino
2001/07/01	Kochi	E		Dirt 1300m	1		4	3rd	1:28.7	1.5	K.Imamura	Advance Movie
2001/07/15	Kochi	E		Dirt 1300m	6		6	9th	1:28.8	2.3	K.Imamura	Sakura Asset
2001/08/05	Kochi	E		Dirt 1300m	1		4	9th	1:30.6	2.0	K.Imamura	Tosagin Win B
2001/08/27	Kochi	E		Dirt 1300m	9		4	4th	1:30.7	2.2	K.Imamura	Silk Sunshine
2001/09/09	Kochi	E		Dirt 1300m	1		4	2nd	1:27.3	0.2	K.Imamura	Seto Brave
2001/10/07	Kochi	E		Dirt 1300m	5		7	7th	1:29.3	2.1	F.Furukawa	Very Very
2001/10/20	Kochi	E		Dirt 1300m	7		6	2nd	1:28.8	0.7	K.Imamura	Kiyoraka Sparrow
2001/11/05	Kochi	E		Dirt 1300m	3		2	8th	1:28.5	2.2	Y.Ogata	Guinness Book
2001/11/23	Kochi	E		Dirt 1300m	1		7	7th	1:31.2	2.7	F.Furukawa	Kaiyou Heat
2001/12/15	Kochi	E		Dirt 1300m	7		7	9th	1:29.3	2.6	F.Furukawa	Meiner Gabe
2001/12/31	Kochi	E		Dirt 1300m	10		5	8th	1:31.3	1.9	H.Miyagawa	Feeling Raijin
2002 – seven-year-old season
2002/01/19	Kochi	E		Dirt 1300m	6		4	9th	1:30.6	2.8	K.Imamura	Aino Golden
2002/02/16	Kochi	E		Dirt 1300m	1		7	10th	1:30.8	3.6	K.Imamura	Ibuki Rise Up
2002/03/09	Kochi	E		Dirt 1300m	8		6	6th	1:29.7	1.4	K.Imamura	Yuubi Shop
2002/03/30	Kochi	E		Dirt 1300m	9		7	8th	1:29.0	2.3	Y.Ogata	Kijou Kodama
2002/04/28	Kochi	E		Dirt 1300m	6		8	7th	1:30.6	2.5	Y.Ogata	Lovely George
2002/05/05	Kochi	E		Dirt 1300m	4		8	3rd	1:26.5	0.8	Y.Ogata	Just Touch
2002/05/13	Kochi	E		Dirt 1300m	3		6	6th	1:28.3	2.0	Y.Ogata	Remain Guts
2002/05/26	Kochi	E		Dirt 1400m	7		3	6th	1:35.4	1.3	Y.Ogata	East Pegasus
2002/06/23	Kochi	E		Dirt 1400m	7		5	7th	1:36.9	1.7	F.Furukawa	Asahi Tension
2002/07/22	Kochi	E		Dirt 1400m	3		5	4th	1:36.6	2.2	F.Furukawa	Eishin Tempe
2002/08/12	Kochi	E		Dirt 1300m	5		7	2nd	1:27.2	0.3	Y.Tokaji	Namura Hiden
2002/08/31	Kochi	E		Dirt 1300m	5		6	8th	1:28.0	2.4	F.Furukawa	With Honesty
2002/09/14	Kochi	E		Dirt 1400m	1		8	9th	1:38.0	3.2	Y.Tokaji	Tomoe Moule
2002/10/13	Kochi	E		Dirt 1400m	10		10	7th	1:37.2	1.9	S.Hanamoto	Hatshepsu
2002/10/29	Kochi	E		Dirt 1300m	1		4	8th	1:31.0	2.4	M.Ueda	San M.Papillon
2002/11/24	Kochi	E		Dirt 1300m	5		8	7th	1:30.5	1.7	Y.Tokaji	Bamboo Byblos
2002/12/07	Kochi	E		Dirt 1400m	1		3	6th	1:35.1	1.9	M.Ueda	Divine Call
2002/12/22	Kochi	E		Dirt 1300m	4		4	4th	1:28.5	0.5	M.Ueda	Hikaru Sazan Cross
2003 – eight-year-old season
2003/01/01	Kochi	E		Dirt 1400m	3		3	5th	1:37.5	2.6	M.Ueda	Toushin Koban
2003/01/18	Kochi	E		Dirt 1300m	4		4	8th	1:30.4	2.6	M.Ueda	Cloune
2003/02/10	Kochi	E		Dirt 1300m	7		7	6th	1:27.6	1.6	F.Furukawa	Silk Ability
2003/03/01	Kochi	E		Dirt 1300m	9		8	7th	1:28.8	2.6	F.Furukawa	Meiner Pensee
2003/03/10	Kochi	E 2nd Race		Dirt 1300m	1		5	6th	1:30.0	1.9	H.Miyagawa	Marutaka Blizzard
2003/03/17	Kochi	E		Dirt 1400m	2		6	7th	1:35.9	1.4	F.Furukawa	Kamui Fujin
2003/04/27	Kochi	G		Dirt 1300m	9		6	6th	1:29.2	1.6	M.Ueda	Heisei Kagura
2003/05/10	Kochi	G		Dirt 1300m	7		8	7th	1:29.9	3.4	H.Miyagawa	Titanic O
2003/05/17	Kochi	G		Dirt 1300m	4		5	4th	1:29.1	0.5	M.Miyagawa	Y.B.Surf
2003/06/07	Kochi	G3		Dirt 1300m	1		7	6th	1:29.2	3.4	F.Furukawa	Meiner Trust
2003/06/21	Kochi	G5 2nd Race		Dirt 1300m	5		5	8th	1:28.0	2.5	M.Ueda	Yugiri Jo
2003/07/05	Kochi	G2		Dirt 1300m	7		4	8th	1:28.5	3.5	H.Miyagawa	Jono Jimbaran
2003/07/27	Kochi	G2		Dirt 1300m	10		2	7th	1:30.3	3.5	K.Kawae	Meiner Vintage
2003/08/10	Kochi	G2		Dirt 1300m	6		2	5th	1:30.0	1.0	F.Furukawa	Yamahisa Teio
2003/08/24	Kochi	G2		Dirt 1000m	9		3	8th	1:07.3	1.7	F.Furukawa	Minonoto Sama
2003/09/07	Kochi	Ganbare!! Haru Urara		Dirt 1300m	10		2	9th	1:30.5	2.6	F.Furukawa	Corbin Swan
2003/09/28	Kochi	Haru Urara o Oen suru		Dirt 1300m	4		2	5th	1:30.1	1.3	F.Furukawa	Turf in Flight
2003/10/13	Kochi	F5		Dirt 1300m	1		1	6th	1:28.4	2.3	Y.Ogata	Corbin Swan
2003/10/25	Kochi	Urara Otanjobi Kinen Tokubetsu		Dirt 1300m	1		2	7th	1:32.1	2.8	M.Ueda	Marutaka Crafty
2003/11/09	Kochi	Ouchi e Kaero CLU		Dirt 1300m	1		2	3rd	1:28.8	2.3	F.Furukawa	News Flash
2003/11/30	Kochi	Urara no Hon January 2004		Dirt 1300m	7		2	3rd	1:28.3	2.0	F.Furukawa	Zenno Takamoku
2003/12/14	Kochi	Haru Urara 100 Senki		Dirt 1300m	5		1	9th	1:29.9	2.1	F.Furukawa	Kanekome Hikari
2004 – nine-year-old season
2004/01/02	Kochi	Ouchi e Kaero CLU		Dirt 1300m	1		1	7th	1:31.5	1.6	F.Furukawa	Takano Bakushin
2004/01/11	Kochi	Ganbaru Kochi Keiba Gekirei		Dirt 1300m	10		3	10th	1:31.9	3.3	F.Furukawa	Sea Riant
2004/02/01	Kochi	Haru Urara Kanko Korosha		Dirt 1300m	7		1	6th	1:32.0	0.5	F.Furukawa	Kanetoshi Freedom
2004/02/15	Kochi	Kochi o Marugoto Itada		Dirt 1300m	3		3	7th	1:32.0	1.5	F.Furukawa	Grail Mining
2004/02/29	Kochi	Tassuiga wa, Ikan		Dirt 1300m	11		1	9th	1:29.0	2.2	F.Furukawa	Grail Mining
2004/03/22	Kochi	YS Derby Jockey		Dirt 1300m	5		1	10th	1:28.6	2.2	Y.Take	Fast Bounce
2004/04/18	Kochi	Minna Ganbatterun		Dirt 1300m	6		2	5th	1:30.7	1.5	F.Furukawa	Canyon Daikan
2004/05/05	Kochi	Haru Urara Asunaro Tokubetsu		Dirt 1300m	11		2	6th	1:30.3	1.3	F.Furukawa	Suzuma Saru
2004/05/23	Kochi	Haru Urara Sanka: Hatsu		Dirt 1300m	5		2	2nd	1:30.9	0.3	F.Furukawa	Green Seresa
2004/06/13	Kochi	Shou Umi Fukaku Chiyo no Sora e Tokubetsu (F7)		Dirt 1300m	6		1	3rd	1:30.9	1.8	F.Furukawa	Suzuma Saru
2004/06/27	Kochi	Otoko no Kunsho ☆ Ganbatte		Dirt 1300m	5		1	5th	1:28.9	1.2	F.Furukawa	Rainbow Shuttle
2004/07/11	Kochi	Urara Summer Ray		Dirt 1300m	3		2	4th	1:29.6	0.8	F.Furukawa	Many Memory
2004/08/03	Kochi	Haru Urara Challenge		Dirt 1300m	3		3	5th	1:28.9	3.7	F.Furukawa	Onozomi Doori

== Pedigree ==
Pedigree of Haru Urara (JPN), bay mare 1996
Sire Nippo Teio	Lypheor	Lyphard	Northern Dancer
Sire Nippo Teio	Lypheor	Lyphard	Goofed
Sire Nippo Teio	Lypheor	Klaizia	Sing Sing
Sire Nippo Teio	Lypheor	Klaizia	Klainia
Sire Nippo Teio	Chiyoda Masako	Lover John	Damascus
Sire Nippo Teio	Chiyoda Masako	Lover John	Evening Primrose
Sire Nippo Teio	Chiyoda Masako	Miss O Hayabusa	Partholon
Sire Nippo Teio	Chiyoda Masako	Miss O Hayabusa	World Hayabusa
Dam Heroine	Lucky Sovereign	Nijinsky	Northern Dancer
Dam Heroine	Lucky Sovereign	Nijinsky	Flaming Page
Dam Heroine	Lucky Sovereign	Sovereign	Pardao
Dam Heroine	Lucky Sovereign	Sovereign	Urshalim
Dam Heroine	Peerless Lady	Tesco Boy	Princely Gift
Dam Heroine	Peerless Lady	Tesco Boy	Suncourt
Dam Heroine	Peerless Lady	East Side	Partholon
Dam Heroine	Peerless Lady	East Side	Miss Hakuryu (Family:12)

Through Northern Dancer, Haru Urara was a descendant of extremely influential sires Native Dancer and Nearco.

== See also ==
- List of racehorses
- Maiden race § Famous maiden horses
- Quixall Crossett – British Thoroughbred racehorse
- Underdog – Competitor who is expected to lose
- Zippy Chippy – American-bred Thoroughbred racehorse (1991–2022)
