= Quixall Crossett =

British Thoroughbred racehorse

- Sire: Beverley Boy
- Grandsire: Cheb's Lad
- Dam: Grange Classic
- Damsire: Stype Grange
- Sex: Gelding
- Foaled: 5 April 1985
- Country: United Kingdom
- Colour: Bay
- Breeder: Ted Caine and Joy Caine
- Owner: Ted Caine; Karen Woodhead
- Trainer: Ted Caine
- Record: 103: 0-2-6
- Earnings: £8,502

Quixall Crossett (5 April 1985 – 2006) was a British Thoroughbred racehorse. Competing in minor National Hunt events he failed to demonstrate the slightest trace of any racing ability in 103 starts. His chronic lack of success saw him acquire something of a cult following comparable to Zippy Chippy in the United States and Haru Urara in Japan.

== Background ==
Quixall Crossett was a bay gelding with no white markings bred by the husband and wife team of Ted and Joy Caine. Ted Caine also trained the horse at his High Crossett farm in North Yorkshire throughout his racing career. He was named after the footballer Albert Quixall. Caine later explained that training the horse for a racing career helped him cope with death of his son Malcolm in a farming accident. The horse originally raced in Caine's ownership but from 1993 he carried the colours of Caine's daughter Karen Woodhead.

Quixall Crossett was sired by Beverley Boy, a moderately successful racehorse who won several handicap races over long distances. Quixall Crossett's dam Grange Classic was a female-line descendant of the British broodmare Harpy (foaled 1921) making her a distant relative of Bobbyjo, Cigar and Gio Ponti.

== Racing career ==
Quixall Crossett began his racing career on 21 February 1990 when he finished eighteenth of the nineteen runners in a National Hunt Flat race at Catterick Racecourse. He soon graduated to hurdles and then to chases but showed no aptitude for either type of obstacle and usually came home towards the rear at odds of 50/1 or greater. In the spring of 1996 he showed marginal improvement when he ran second in a race on the amateur point-to-point circuit and then took third place in a hunter chase at Newcastle Racecourse on 16 March. Later that year he finished third on two other occasions before reaching a new career high when he ran second at odds of 150/1 in a minor steeplechase at Kelso Racecourse in October. The gelding ran another 20 races over the next seven months to no avail before finishing third in minor events at Uttoxeter and Market Rasen in May 1997. After another long run of unplaced efforts he produced what was arguably his finest performance in the Catterton Novices' Chase at Wetherby Racecourse on 25 May 1998. Starting the 33/1 outsider of the five-runner field he led for most of the way and kept on well after being overtaken to finish second, two lengths behind the winner Toskano. Quixall Crossett's assistant trainer Geoff Sanderson, who also ran the horse's fan club, commented, "We brought him back to be unsaddled and he got the most tremendous cheer you've ever heard on a race course... The horse doesn't know he gets beat because he gets a bigger cheer than the winner".

Over the next sixteen months Quixall Crossett ran 24 times and managed one third place when coming home last of the finishers in the Hartwell Ford Novices' Chase at Market Rasen on 8 August. After being pulled up a Kelso Racecourse in September 1999 he was off the track for well over a year.

When Quixall Crossett returned to the track as a fifteen-year-old in 2000 his losing run began to attract increasing attention from the mainstream media. As the horse prepared for his comeback Caine commented that the reason for his long losing run was "probably a lack of talent" but added "the main thing is that the horse enjoys it". The gelding recorded his 98th consecutive defeat when finishing last of four at Wetherby on 26 December. The Daily Telegraph's Brough Scott commented "The unbelievable thing about Quixall Crossett is that he keeps coming back for more. You have to hand it to the old boy - he has got racing completely sussed. He has found a very clever way of getting his oats with the minimum of effort".

After another defeat at Kelso in February the gelding was off the course for several months as National Hunt racing was interrupted by the 2001 United Kingdom foot-and-mouth outbreak, before returning for his 100th race at Southwell Racecourse on 22 July. Before the race Geoff Sanderson was cautiously optimistic, saying "He's a great jumper. Safe as houses... His only problem, really, is the bits in between the jumps. Let's just say he's not the quickest". In the event Quixall Crossett soon dropped out of contention and was pulled up at half way leading Ted Caine to say "He just wasn't able to keep up today and he wasn't enjoying himself... a couple more runs like that, and maybe we might have to think about his future". Sanderson later said that he had been sacked by Caine after the race for urging that the horse should be retired.

On 17 October the gelding was beaten more than eighty lengths in a race at Wetherby and then unseated his rider in a contest at the same track sixteen days later. After again unseating his rider at Ayr Racecourse on 18 November he was finally retired from racing after 103 consecutive defeats.

Quixall Crossett died at the age of 21 in 2006. He was euthanized after suffering problems with his feet and teeth. Ted Caine said "all his teeth had worn down, so we were hand-feeding him. His feet were bothering him too, as they were not right, but 21 was a reasonable age." He held the record for consecutive losses in Britain and Ireland until the mare Celerity recorded her 104th consecutive defeat at Haydock in July 2021.

== Pedigree ==
Pedigree of Quixall Crossett (GB), bay gelding 1985
| Sire Beverley Boy (IRE) 1972 | Cheb's Lad (GB); 1965 | Lucky Brief | Counsel |
| Sire Beverley Boy (IRE) 1972 | Cheb's Lad (GB); 1965 | Lucky Brief | Welsh Rose |
| Sire Beverley Boy (IRE) 1972 | Cheb's Lad (GB); 1965 | Cheb | Denturius |
| Sire Beverley Boy (IRE) 1972 | Cheb's Lad (GB); 1965 | Cheb | Bray View |
| Sire Beverley Boy (IRE) 1972 | Painful Details (GB); 1961 | Shantung (FR) | Sicambre |
| Sire Beverley Boy (IRE) 1972 | Painful Details (GB); 1961 | Shantung (FR) | Barley Corn (GB) |
| Sire Beverley Boy (IRE) 1972 | Painful Details (GB); 1961 | Money To Burn | The Phoenix |
| Sire Beverley Boy (IRE) 1972 | Painful Details (GB); 1961 | Money To Burn | Grandpa's Will |
| Dam Grange Classic (GB) 1973 | Stype Range (GB); 1964 | Vieux Manoir (FR) | Brantome |
| Dam Grange Classic (GB) 1973 | Stype Range (GB); 1964 | Vieux Manoir (FR) | Vielle Maison |
| Dam Grange Classic (GB) 1973 | Stype Range (GB); 1964 | Stype | Arctic Star |
| Dam Grange Classic (GB) 1973 | Stype Range (GB); 1964 | Stype | Boreal |
| Dam Grange Classic (GB) 1973 | Plutarch (GB); 1963 | Above Suspicion | Court Martial |
| Dam Grange Classic (GB) 1973 | Plutarch (GB); 1963 | Above Suspicion | Above Board |
| Dam Grange Classic (GB) 1973 | Plutarch (GB); 1963 | Star Baby | My Babu (FR) |
| Dam Grange Classic (GB) 1973 | Plutarch (GB); 1963 | Star Baby | Starry Scene (IRE) (Family: 2-g) |

== See also ==
- Underdog
- Maiden race#Famous maiden horses
- Haru Urara
- Zippy Chippy
