= Zippy Chippy =

American-bred Thoroughbred racehorse (1991–2022)

- Zippy in 2013
- Breed: Thoroughbred
- Sire: Compliance
- Grandsire: Northern Dancer
- Dam: Listen Lady
- Damsire: Buckfinder
- Sex: Gelding
- Foaled: April 20, 1991
- Died: April 15, 2022 (aged 30) (Note: Zippy Chippy was considered a 31 year old, as to being born on January 1.)
- Country: United States
- Breeder: Capritaur Farm
- Owner: Felix Monserrate
- Trainer: Felix Monserrate
- Record: 100: 0-8-12
- Earnings: $30,834

Major wins
- None

Zippy Chippy (April 20, 1991 – April 15, 2022) was a thoroughbred race horse, a bay gelding, who is notable for being winless in 100 races. Zippy Chippy's pedigree includes many famous horses, such as Ben Brush, Buckpasser, Busanda, Bold Ruler, Count Fleet, Man o' War, Nasrullah, Native Dancer, Northern Dancer, Round Table, Tom Fool, War Admiral, and the greatest "blue hen" broodmare of the twentieth century, La Troienne.

== Career ==
Zippy Chippy was owned and trained by Felix Monserrate at Capritaur Farm in New York. Tom Gilcoyne, a retired historian for the National Museum of Racing and Hall of Fame in Saratoga Springs, New York, said that Zippy Chippy "hasn't done anything to harm the sport. But it's a little bit like looking at the recorded performances of all horse races through the wrong end of the telescope."

Felix Monserrate (d. 2015), who had boarded Zippy Chippy, acquired the horse in 1995, in a trade for a 1988 Ford truck. The horse was not always cooperative at races, and was eventually banned from competing at a number of tracks for such antics as "refusing to break from the starting gate". He was also known to bite people and pick people up "by their collars and not letting them down". According to Monserrate, "This horse is mean. ... He's been mean all his life."

In 2000, the magazine People included Zippy Chippy on its list of that year's most interesting personalities.

In August 2001, Zippy came in first against Darnell McDonald, a minor league baseball player, in a 50-yard race. He had lost a previous 40-yard race against Rochester outfielder José Herrera on August 18, 2000. Zippy also won against a harness racer called Paddy's Lady in a publicity stunt in which he spotted the trotter a twenty-length lead.

Zippy Chippy's 100th loss occurred on September 10, 2004, in the Northampton Fair at the Three County Fairgrounds. He went off at odds of 7–2, making him the second betting choice; however, Zippy Chippy finished last. In December 2004, he retired from racing to become an outrider pony at his hometown track, Finger Lakes racetrack in Farmington, New York, where he had been banned from racing on September 8, 1998, after failing to leave the gate with the rest of the field for the third consecutive time. As an outrider pony, he escorted horses in the post parade and led them to the gate.

Other horses with similarly long losing streaks include Treboh Joe (1 win for 247 starts with 236 consecutive losses, United States), Dance Saber (0 wins for 229 starts, Japan), Namino Hana (0 wins for 198 starts, Japan), Meine Attrice (0 for 192, Japan), Dona Chepa (0 for 135, Puerto Rico), Quixall Crossett (0 for 103, Britain), Costano Mille (0 for 123, Australia), Ouroene (0 for 124, Australia), and Haru Urara (0 for 113, Japan).

Zippy Chippy's lifetime record is: 100 starts, 0 wins, and lifetime earnings of $30,834; he also had eight second-place and 12 third-place finishes.

== Retirement ==
Zippy Chippy retired to the Bobby Frankel Division of Old Friends Thoroughbred Retirement Farm at Cabin Creek near Saratoga Race Course in New York on April 22, 2010. The 19-year-old gelding joined Cabin Creek's seven other retirees and lived out his life there.

Zippy Chippy went on tour in Kentucky in the summer of 2012 to bring attention to the safe retirement of race horses. Zippy-themed merchandises were also sold to raise funds to support the retirement of race horses at the farm.

At the age of 30, Zippy Chippy was featured in the 2020 children's picture book, The True Story of Zippy Chippy: The Little Horse That Couldn't. He was previously featured in the 2016 book The Legend of Zippy Chippy: Life Lessons from Horse Racing’s Most Lovable Loser.

Zippy Chippy's death was announced by Old Friends farm on April 16, 2022; he was officially 31 years old (by horse racing standards, all horses turn a year older on January 1).

== Race record ==
| Date | Age | Distance | Race | Grade | Track | Surface | Odds | Field | Finish | Winning Time | Winning (Losing) Margin | Jockey | Ref |
|---|---|---|---|---|---|---|---|---|---|---|---|---|---|
| Sep 13, 1994 | 3 | 6 1/2 furlongs | Maiden Special Weight | Maiden | Belmont Park | Dirt | 14.50 | 10 | 8 | 1:18.13 | (13 1/4 lengths) | Julio Pezua | |
| Sep 23, 1994 | 3 | 7 furlongs | Maiden Special Weight | Maiden | Belmont Park | Dirt | 36.10 | 11 | 3 | 1:24.53 | (10 lengths) | Julio Pezua | |
| Oct 1, 1994 | 3 | 1 1/16 miles | Maiden Special Weight | Maiden | Belmont Park | Dirt | 4.60 | 7 | 4 | 1:45.55 | (30 1/2 lengths) | Robbie Davis | |
| Oct 6, 1994 | 3 | 1 1/16 miles | Maiden Special Weight | Maiden | Belmont Park | Turf | 6.40 | 8 | 3 | 1:45.97 | (2 3/4 lengths) | Jose Santos | |
| Oct 14, 1994 | 3 | 1 1/16 miles | Maiden Special Weight | Maiden | Belmont Park | Turf | 9.70 | 12 | 10 | 1:41.95 | (28 1/4 lengths) | Mike Smith | |
| Oct 28, 1994 | 3 | 1 1/8 miles | Maiden Special Weight | Maiden | Aqueduct | Turf | 10.00 | 12 | 9 | 1:52.45 | (20 1/2 lengths) | Robbie Davis | |
| Nov 16, 1994 | 3 | 1 mile | Maiden Special Weight | Maiden | Aqueduct | Dirt | 12.20 | 8 | 8 | 1:39.50 | (54 lengths) | Jorge Chavez | |
| Nov 26, 1994 | 3 | 6 furlongs | Maiden Special Weight | Maiden | Finger Lakes | Dirt | 3.75 | 7 | 4 | 1:13.60 | (4 1/2 lengths) | Kevin Whitley | |
| Dec 9, 1994 | 3 | 5 1/2 furlongs | Allowance | Allowance | Finger Lakes | Dirt | 2.55 | 7 | 3 | 1:05.60 | (3 1/2 lengths) | Leslie Hulet | |
| Jan 8, 1995 | 4 | 6 furlongs | Maiden Claiming | Maiden | Aqueduct | Inner Track | 4.40 | 11 | 10 | 1:14.73 | (25 3/4 lengths) | Richard Migliore | |
| Jan 23, 1995 | 4 | 6 furlongs | Maiden Special Weight | Maiden | Suffolk Downs | Dirt | 19.30 | 10 | 5 | 1:16.73 | (4 1/4 lengths) | Jorge Vargas | |
| Feb 15, 1995 | 4 | 6 furlongs | Maiden Special Weight | Maiden | Suffolk Downs | Dirt | 7.70 | 12 | 12 | 1:13.21 | (15 1/2 lengths) | Jorge Vargas | |
| Mar 10, 1995 | 4 | 6 furlongs | Maiden Special Weight | Maiden | Suffolk Downs | Dirt | 20.80 | 8 | 8 | 1:14.18 | (18 1/4 lengths) | Jorge Vargas | |
| Apr 12, 1995 | 4 | 6 furlongs | Maiden Special Weight | Maiden | Suffolk Downs | Dirt | 21.40 | 6 | 4 | 1:15.02 | (13 1/2 lengths) | Jorge Vargas | |
| Apr 19, 1995 | 4 | 6 furlongs | Maiden Claiming | Maiden | Suffolk Downs | Dirt | 6.00 | 9 | 8 | 1:15.30 | (14 1/2 lengths) | Jorge Vargas | |
| Apr 28, 1995 | 4 | 1 mile | Maiden Claiming | Maiden | Suffolk Downs | Dirt | 5.00 | 6 | 3 | 1:45.76 | (1 1/4 lengths) | Jorge Vargas | |
| May 23, 1995 | 4 | 6 furlongs | Maiden Special Weight | Maiden | Finger Lakes | Dirt | 9.30 | 8 | 4 | 1:12.80 | (14 lengths) | Kevin Whitley | |
| Jun 3, 1995 | 4 | 1 mile and 70 yards | Maiden Special Weight | Maiden | Finger Lakes | Dirt | 5.70 | 5 | 4 | 1:48.60 | (30 3/4 lengths) | Kevin Whitley | |
| Jun 16, 1995 | 4 | 1 mile | Maiden Claiming | Maiden | Finger Lakes | Dirt | 4.40 | 7 | 6 | 1:45.80 | (14 lengths) | Jose Gutierrez | |
| Jul 6, 1995 | 4 | 5 1/2 furlongs | Maiden Claiming | Maiden | Finger Lakes | Dirt | 7.80 | 8 | 3 | 1:07.40 | (2 3/4 lengths) | David Rivera | |
| Jul 29, 1995 | 4 | 1 mile | Maiden Claiming | Maiden | Finger Lakes | Dirt | 3.75 | 8 | 5 | 1:44.40 | (14 lengths) | David Rivera | |
| Aug 8, 1995 | 4 | 6 furlongs | Maiden Claiming | Maiden | Finger Lakes | Dirt | 11.10 | 8 | 3 | 1:13.00 | (12 lengths) | David Rivera | |
| Aug 20, 1995 | 4 | 6 furlongs | Maiden Special Weight | Maiden | Finger Lakes | Dirt | 9.60 | 6 | 5 | 1:14.00 | (18 1/4 lengths) | Carlos Dominguez | |
| Aug 30, 1995 | 4 | 6 furlongs | Maiden Claiming | Maiden | Finger Lakes | Dirt | 16.00 | 10 | 7 | 1:13.80 | (14 1/4 lengths) | David Rivera | |
| Sep 10, 1995 | 4 | 1 mile and 70 yards | Maiden Special Weight | Maiden | Finger Lakes | Dirt | 11.10 | 6 | 6 | 1:49.00 | (19 3/4 lengths) | David Rivera | |
| Sep 23, 1995 | 4 | 6 furlongs | Maiden Claiming | Maiden | Finger Lakes | Dirt | 2.75 | 8 | 2 | 1:16.80 | (1 1/4 lengths) | Jorge Hiraldo | |
| Oct 3, 1995 | 4 | 5 1/2 furlongs | Maiden Claiming | Maiden | Finger Lakes | Dirt | *2.25 | 11 | 2 | 1:09.20 | (neck) | Jorge Hiraldo | |
| Oct 13, 1995 | 4 | 5 1/2 furlongs | Maiden Claiming | Maiden | Finger Lakes | Dirt | 4.10 | 8 | 7 | 1:07.40 | (16 3/4 lengths) | Jorge Hiraldo | |
| Oct 16, 1995 | 4 | 6 furlongs | Maiden Special Weight | Maiden | Finger Lakes | Dirt | 22.90 | 7 | 7 | 1:13.60 | (16 1/2 lengths) | Jorge Hiraldo | |
| Oct 22, 1995 | 4 | 5 1/2 furlongs | Maiden Claiming | Maiden | Finger Lakes | Dirt | 5.80 | 6 | 5 | 1:08.00 | (12 1/2 lengths) | Jorge Hiraldo | |
| Nov 3, 1995 | 4 | 6 furlongs | Maiden Claiming | Maiden | Finger Lakes | Dirt | 15.20 | 8 | 7 | 1:14.80 | (14 1/2 lengths) | Jorge Hiraldo | |
| Nov 14, 1995 | 4 | 5 1/2 furlongs | Maiden Claiming | Maiden | Finger Lakes | Dirt | *3.50 | 11 | 6 | 1:09.00 | (9 3/4 lengths) | Pedro Monterrey | |
| Nov 21, 1995 | 4 | 1 mile and 70 yards | Maiden Claiming | Maiden | Finger Lakes | Dirt | 5.70 | 8 | 5 | 1:52.20 | (4 1/2 lengths) | Jorge Hiraldo | |
| Nov 26, 1995 | 4 | 6 furlongs | Maiden Claiming | Maiden | Finger Lakes | Dirt | 10.50 | 7 | 2 | 1:14.30 | (3 1/4 lengths) | Leslie Hulet | |
| Dec 4, 1995 | 4 | 1 mile and 70 yards | Maiden Special Weight | Maiden | Finger Lakes | Dirt | 8.50 | 6 | 6 | 1:52.30 | (15 1/4 lengths) | Leslie Hulet | |
| Jul 6, 1996 | 5 | 6 furlongs | Maiden Special Weight | Maiden | Finger Lakes | Dirt | 19.40 | 6 | 4 | 1:13.40 | (23 1/2 lengths) | Julio Leon, Jr. | |
| Jul 15, 1996 | 5 | 6 furlongs | Maiden Claiming | Maiden | Finger Lakes | Dirt | 16.40 | 7 | 5 | 1:16.20 | (13 lengths) | Julio Leon, Jr. | |
| Jul 20, 1996 | 5 | 1 mile and 70 yards | Maiden Claiming | Maiden | Finger Lakes | Dirt | 13.90 | 6 | 6 | 1:51.60 | (43 3/4 lengths) | Julio Leon, Jr. | |
| Jul 27, 1996 | 5 | 5 1/2 furlongs | Maiden Claiming | Maiden | Finger Lakes | Dirt | 30.25 | 8 | 7 | 1:07.80 | (10 3/4 lengths) | Julio Leon, Jr. | |
| Jul 30, 1996 | 5 | 1 mile and 70 yards | Maiden Claiming | Maiden | Finger Lakes | Dirt | 21.30 | 7 | 6 | 1:49.00 | (18 1/4 lengths) | Julio Leon, Jr. | |
| Aug 10, 1996 | 5 | 1 mile | Maiden Claiming | Maiden | Finger Lakes | Dirt | 46.25 | 7 | 5 | 1:43.60 | (20 1/4 lengths) | Miguel Escribano | |
| Aug 23, 1996 | 5 | 1 mile | Maiden Special Weight | Maiden | Finger Lakes | Dirt | 38.25 | 8 | 4 | 1:43.20 | (14 1/2 lengths) | Miguel Escribano | |
| Sep 4, 1996 | 5 | 1 mile | Maiden Special Weight | Maiden | Finger Lakes | Dirt | 3.80 | 7 | 7 | 1:44.20 | (14 1/4 lengths) | Miguel Escribano | |
| Sep 13, 1996 | 5 | 1 mile | Maiden Special Weight | Maiden | Finger Lakes | Dirt | 14.60 | 7 | 3 | 1:46.00 | (3/4 length) | Carlos Camilo | |
| Sep 23, 1996 | 5 | 1 mile and 70 yards | Maiden Special Weight | Maiden | Finger Lakes | Dirt | 7.90 | 6 | 5 | 1:49.40 | (18 1/4 lengths) | Carlos Camilo | |
| Oct 6, 1996 | 5 | 1 mile | Maiden Special Weight | Maiden | Finger Lakes | Dirt | 9.70 | 10 | 9 | 1:40.60 | (30 lengths) | David Rivera | |
| Nov 6, 1996 | 5 | 5 1/2 furlongs | Maiden Special Weight | Maiden | Finger Lakes | Dirt | 11.50 | 7 | 3 | 1:07.00 | (8 1/4 lengths) | Scott Leo | |
| Nov 16, 1996 | 5 | 5 1/2 furlongs | Maiden Claiming | Maiden | Finger Lakes | Dirt | 12.80 | 9 | 6 | 1:04.60 | (14 1/2 lengths) | Scott Leo | |
| Nov 30, 1996 | 5 | 5 1/2 furlongs | Maiden Special Weight | Maiden | Finger Lakes | Dirt | 10.40 | 7 | 6 | 1:07.20 | (9 1/2 lengths) | Leslie Hulet | |
| Dec 2, 1996 | 5 | 1 mile and 70 yards | Allowance | Allowance | Finger Lakes | Dirt | 21.90 | 9 | DNF | 1:46.80 | DNF | Elis Roque | |
| Jul 14, 1997 | 6 | 6 furlongs | Maiden Claiming | Maiden | Finger Lakes | Dirt | 35.75 | 9 | 8 | 1:13.20 | (11 3/4 lengths) | Jorge Hiraldo | |
| Jul 22, 1997 | 6 | 6 furlongs | Maiden Special Weight | Maiden | Finger Lakes | Dirt | 2.55 | 8 | 7 | 1:13.80 | (9 1/2 lengths) | Jesus Miranda | |
| Jul 27, 1997 | 6 | 1 mile and 70 yards | Maiden Special Weight | Maiden | Finger Lakes | Dirt | 5.70 | 8 | 7 | 1:45.40 | (24 1/4 lengths) | Jesus Miranda | |
| Aug 1, 1997 | 6 | 1 1/16 miles | Maiden Claiming | Maiden | Finger Lakes | Dirt | 4.30 | 7 | 6 | 1:51.40 | (14 3/4 lengths) | Jose Gutierrez | |
| Aug 10, 1997 | 6 | 1 1/16 miles | Maiden Special Weight | Maiden | Finger Lakes | Dirt | 3.00 | 8 | 7 | 1:49.00 | (9 1/2 lengths) | Jorge Guerra | |
| Aug 17, 1997 | 6 | 1 mile and 70 yards | Maiden Claiming | Maiden | Finger Lakes | Dirt | 20.10 | 8 | 6 | 1:48.20 | (7 lengths) | Elis Roque | |
| Aug 26, 1997 | 6 | 1 1/16 miles | Maiden Claiming | Maiden | Finger Lakes | Dirt | 20.40 | 7 | 5 | 1:50.40 | (7 1/4 lengths) | Elis Roque | |
| Sep 4, 1997 | 6 | 1 1/8 miles | Maiden Claiming | Maiden | Finger Lakes | Dirt | 11.20 | 7 | 4 | 1:57.40 | (15 3/4 lengths) | David Rivera | |
| Sep 14, 1997 | 6 | 1 mile and 70 yards | Maiden Claiming | Maiden | Finger Lakes | Dirt | 12.20 | 8 | 6 | 1:47.40 | (13 lengths) | David Rivera | |
| Sep 27, 1997 | 6 | 5 1/2 furlongs | Maiden Claiming | Maiden | Finger Lakes | Dirt | 14.20 | 8 | 4 | 1:07.20 | (10 1/4 lengths) | Jeremias Flores | |
| Oct 5, 1997 | 6 | 6 furlongs | Maiden Claiming | Maiden | Finger Lakes | Dirt | 11.40 | 7 | 7 | 1:15.20 | (7 3/4 lengths) | Jeremias Flores | |
| Oct 10, 1997 | 6 | 5 1/2 furlongs | Maiden Claiming | Maiden | Finger Lakes | Dirt | 22.80 | 7 | 4 | 1:07.60 | (6 1/2 lengths) | Leslie Hulet | |
| Oct 18, 1997 | 6 | 1 1/16 miles | Maiden Special Weight | Maiden | Finger Lakes | Dirt | 13.00 | 6 | 5 | 1:49.20 | (14 1/2 lengths) | Jorge Hiraldo | |
| Oct 21, 1997 | 6 | 1 mile and 70 yards | Maiden Claiming | Maiden | Finger Lakes | Dirt | 10.30 | 7 | 5 | 1:48.40 | (6 3/4 lengths) | Jorge Hiraldo | |
| Nov 2, 1997 | 6 | 1 mile and 70 yards | Maiden Special Weight | Maiden | Finger Lakes | Dirt | 11.50 | 9 | 3 | 1:46.60 | (8 lengths) | Jorge Hiraldo | |
| Nov 12, 1997 | 6 | 6 furlongs | Maiden Special Weight | Maiden | Finger Lakes | Dirt | 11.60 | 8 | 8 | 1:12.80 | (13 lengths) | Jorge Hiraldo | |
| Nov 16, 1997 | 6 | 6 furlongs | Maiden Claiming | Maiden | Finger Lakes | Dirt | 3.05 | 7 | 4 | 1:14.40 | (9 lengths) | Jorge Hiraldo | |
| Nov 24, 1997 | 6 | 1 1/16 miles | Allowance | Allowance | Finger Lakes | Dirt | 23.60 | 10 | 10 | 1:48.80 | (30 lengths) | Jorge Hiraldo | |
| Nov 30, 1997 | 6 | 1 1/8 miles | Maiden Claiming | Maiden | Finger Lakes | Dirt | 2.40 | 5 | 2 | 1:58.60 | (22 1/2 lengths) | Jorge Hiraldo | |
| Dec 2, 1997 | 6 | 1 1/8 miles | Claiming | Claiming | Finger Lakes | Dirt | 9.00 | 6 | 4 | 1:58.60 | (5 lengths) | Jeremias Flores | |
| Apr 3, 1998 | 7 | 4 1/2 furlongs | Maiden Claiming | Maiden | Finger Lakes | Dirt | 26.75 | 7 | 4 | 0:52.60 | (8 1/2 lengths) | Benjamin Afanador | |
| Apr 8, 1998 | 7 | 4 1/2 furlongs | Maiden Claiming | Maiden | Finger Lakes | Dirt | 11.60 | 7 | 4 | 0:53.20 | (4 3/4 lengths) | Benjamin Afanador | |
| Apr 14, 1998 | 7 | 5 furlongs | Maiden Claiming | Maiden | Finger Lakes | Dirt | 6.20 | 7 | 2 | 0:59.20 | (2 1/4 lengths) | Benjamin Afanador | |
| Apr 25, 1998 | 7 | 5 furlongs | Maiden Claiming | Maiden | Finger Lakes | Dirt | 5.80 | 6 | 2 | 1:00.00 | (1 length) | Benjamin Afanador | |
| Apr 27, 1998 | 7 | 1 1/16 miles | Maiden Special Weight | Maiden | Finger Lakes | Dirt | 5.90 | 8 | 7 | 1:47.40 | (30 1/4 lengths) | Benjamin Afanador | |
| May 5, 1998 | 7 | 5 1/2 furlongs | Maiden Claiming | Maiden | Finger Lakes | Dirt | 2.55 | 8 | 5 | 1:07.00 | (15 1/4 lengths) | David Rivera | |
| May 15, 1998 | 7 | 5 1/2 furlongs | Maiden Special Weight | Maiden | Finger Lakes | Dirt | 6.90 | 10 | 7 | 1:06.80 | (13 3/4 lengths) | Benjamin Afanador | |
| May 23, 1998 | 7 | 6 furlongs | Maiden Claiming | Maiden | Finger Lakes | Dirt | 15.60 | 7 | 3 | 1:14.60 | (1 1/2 lengths) | Benjamin Afanador | |
| May 30, 1998 | 7 | 5 1/2 furlongs | Maiden Special Weight | Maiden | Finger Lakes | Dirt | 6.90 | 7 | 4 | 1:06.40 | (15 1/2 lengths) | Benjamin Afanador | |
| Jun 13, 1998 | 7 | 5 1/2 furlongs | Maiden Claiming | Maiden | Finger Lakes | Dirt | 9.30 | 8 | 7 | 1:06.20 | (13 1/4 lengths) | Benjamin Afanador | |
| Jun 23, 1998 | 7 | 6 furlongs | Maiden Special Weight | Maiden | Finger Lakes | Dirt | 17.90 | 7 | 7 | 1:11.60 | (26 1/4 lengths) | Benjamin Afanador | |
| Jul 6, 1998 | 7 | 6 furlongs | Maiden Claiming | Maiden | Finger Lakes | Dirt | 8.80 | 7 | 5 | 1:14.00 | (14 1/2 lengths) | Benjamin Afanador | |
| Sep 8, 1998 | 7 | 1 1/16 miles | Maiden Special Weight | Maiden | Finger Lakes | Dirt | 2.70 | 9 | 9 | 1:52.20 | (38 lengths) | Juan Rohena | |
| Sep 5, 1999 | 8 | About 6 1/2 furlongs | Maiden Claiming | Maiden | Northampton | Dirt | 5.70 | 6 | 3 | 1:23.94 | (13 1/4 lengths) | Clemente Crispin | |
| Sep 1, 2000 | 9 | About 5 furlongs | Maiden Special Weight | Maiden | Northampton | Dirt | 2.60 | 7 | 2 | 0:58.40 | (head) | Juan Rohena | |
| Sep 16, 2000 | 9 | About 6 1/2 furlongs | Maiden Special Weight | Maiden | Northampton | Dirt | 2.20 | 8 | 3 | 1:25.34 | (3 lengths) | Juan Rohena | |
| Feb 16, 2001 | 10 | 6 furlongs | Maiden Special Weight | Maiden | Penn National | Dirt | 4.20 | 7 | 7 | 1:12.47 | (32 1/2 lengths) | Pedro Carrasquel | |
| Sep 9, 2001 | 10 | About 5 furlongs | Maiden Special Weight | Maiden | Northampton | Dirt | 3.00 | 6 | 5 | 0:57.80 | (16 1/2 lengths) | Juan Rohena | |
| Sep 15, 2001 | 10 | About 6 1/2 furlongs | Maiden Special Weight | Maiden | Northampton | Dirt | 10.50 | 8 | 7 | 1:27.00 | (17 3/4 lengths) | Juan Rohena | |
| Jan 31, 2002 | 11 | 6 furlongs | Maiden Special Weight | Maiden | Penn National | Dirt | 14.20 | 7 | 7 | 1:13.43 | (32 3/4 lengths) | David Hernandez | |
| Feb 28, 2002 | 11 | 5 furlongs | Maiden Special Weight | Maiden | Penn National | Dirt | 13.00 | 9 | 8 | 1:00.49 | (24 3/4 lengths) | David Hernandez | |
| Aug 31, 2002 | 11 | About 6 1/2 furlongs | Maiden Special Weight | Maiden | Northampton | Dirt | 6.20 | 8 | 7 | 1:24.55 | (24 3/4 lengths) | Juan Rohena | |
| Sep 8, 2002 | 11 | About 6 1/2 furlongs | Maiden Special Weight | Maiden | Northampton | Dirt | 9.70 | 7 | 4 | 1:23.89 | (15 lengths) | Juan Rohena | |
| Sep 15, 2002 | 11 | About 5 furlongs | Maiden Special Weight | Maiden | Northampton | Dirt | 8.30 | 8 | 6 | 0:58.44 | (5 3/4 lengths) | Willie Belmonte | |
| Apr 16, 2003 | 12 | 5 1/2 furlongs | Maiden Special Weight | Maiden | Thistledown | Dirt | 42.30 | 8 | 8 | 1:05.32 | (32 lengths) | Benjamin Cacha-Padilla | |
| Sep 6, 2003 | 12 | About 5 furlongs | Maiden Special Weight | Maiden | Northampton | Dirt | 7.00 | 8 | 2 | 0:58.74 | (1 1/2 lengths) | Howard Lanci | |
| Sep 4, 2004 | 13 | About 6 1/2 furlongs | Maiden Special Weight | Maiden | Northampton | Dirt | 5.60 | 8 | 7 | 1:25.01 | (31 3/4 lengths) | Joseph Riston | |
| Sep 10, 2004 | 13 | About 5 furlongs | Maiden Special Weight | Maiden | Northampton | Dirt | 3.70 | 8 | 8 | 1:00.55 | (11 lengths) | Willie Belmonte | |

== Adaptations ==
- Thomas, William (5 April 2016). The Legend of Zippy Chippy: Life Lessons from Horse Racing's Most Lovable Loser. McClelland & Stewart. ISBN 978-0-7710-8162-0.
- Bennett, Artie (February 25, 2020). The True Story of Zippy Chippy: The Little Horse That Couldn't. Illustrated by Dave Szalay. NorthSouth Books. ISBN 978-0-7358-4396-7. (children's picture-book biography).

== Pedigree ==
Pedigree of Zippy Chippy, bay gelding, foaled April 20, 1991
| Sire Compliance b. 1978 | Northern Dancer b. 1961 | Nearctic br. 1954 | Nearco |
| Sire Compliance b. 1978 | Northern Dancer b. 1961 | Nearctic br. 1954 | Lady Angela |
| Sire Compliance b. 1978 | Northern Dancer b. 1961 | Natalma b. 1957 | Native Dancer |
| Sire Compliance b. 1978 | Northern Dancer b. 1961 | Natalma b. 1957 | Almahmoud |
| Sire Compliance b. 1978 | Sex Appeal ch. 1970 | Buckpasser b. 1963 | Tom Fool |
| Sire Compliance b. 1978 | Sex Appeal ch. 1970 | Buckpasser b. 1963 | Busanda |
| Sire Compliance b. 1978 | Sex Appeal ch. 1970 | Best In Show ch. 1965 | Traffic Judge |
| Sire Compliance b. 1978 | Sex Appeal ch. 1970 | Best In Show ch. 1965 | Stolen Hour |
| Dam Listen Lady dkb/br. 1982 | Buckfinder dkb/br. 1974 | Buckpasser b. 1963 | Tom Fool |
| Dam Listen Lady dkb/br. 1982 | Buckfinder dkb/br. 1974 | Buckpasser b. 1963 | Busanda |
| Dam Listen Lady dkb/br. 1982 | Buckfinder dkb/br. 1974 | Shenanigans gr. 1963 | Native Dancer |
| Dam Listen Lady dkb/br. 1982 | Buckfinder dkb/br. 1974 | Shenanigans gr. 1963 | Bold Irish |
| Dam Listen Lady dkb/br. 1982 | Wide Application b. 1978 | What a Pleasure ch. 1965 | Bold Ruler |
| Dam Listen Lady dkb/br. 1982 | Wide Application b. 1978 | What a Pleasure ch. 1965 | Grey Flight |
| Dam Listen Lady dkb/br. 1982 | Wide Application b. 1978 | Running Juliet b. 1966 | Round Table |
| Dam Listen Lady dkb/br. 1982 | Wide Application b. 1978 | Running Juliet b. 1966 | Juliet's Nurse (Family 23-b) |

Zippy Chippy was inbred 3 × 3 to Buckpasser, meaning that Buckpasser appeared twice in the third generation of his pedigree. He was also inbred 4 × 4 to Native Dancer.

== See also ==
- Underdog
- Haru Urara, a similarly unsuccessful, but popular Japanese racehorse.
- List of racehorses
