= Takeyoriwake Sho =

Japanese thoroughbred race

Takeyoriwake Sho (Japan)
- Location: Kochi Racecourse
- Inaugurated: 1977
- Race type: Thoroughbred - Flat racing

Race information
- Distance: 1,400 meters (about 8 furlongs / 1 mile)
- Surface: Dirt
- Qualification: Three-year-old and over Fillies
- Weight: 56kg-57kg
- Purse: ¥2,500,000; 1st: ¥ 750,000

The Takeyoriwake Sho (in Japanese: 建依別賞) is a Japanese race for three-year-old and up fillies in the Kochi Horse Racing Association.

== Race details ==
The race was established in 1977 and the first edition of the race was held in 1978. It was known as the "Kenyoku Betsu Special", but changed its name in 1989.

The race was originally run over 1,600 meters but was then shortened to 1,400 meters in 1985.

== Winners since 2014 ==
Year	Winner	Jockey	Trainer	Owner	Time
2014	Fire Float	Shuji Akaoka	Keisuke Matsuki	Hideo Okabayashi	1:28.8
2015	Epsom Aaron	Taichi Nagamori	Saika Masamitsu	Reiko Miyazaki	1:27.6
2016	Meisho Percy	Minoru Miyagawa	Yuko Utsukoshi	Keisho Matsumoto	1:30.1
2017	Kassai	Taichi Nagamori	Saika Masamitsu	Makoto Komine	1:29.6
2018	Sakura Regnum	Shuji Akaoka	Mamoru Tanaka	Maki Tanioka	1:28.9
2019	Keima	Taichi Nagamori	Kazuya Makita	Koji Ishikawa	1:26.6
2020	Thrilla In Manila	Syuji Akaoka	Mamoru Tanaka	Shinichi Koga	1:30.7
2021	Spell Marron	Ikuyasu Kurakane	Shinji Beppu	Isao Nishimori	1:28.1
2022	Amazing Run	Taichi Nagamori	Yuji Uchikoshi	Kajimoto Holdings Co Ltd	1:29.4
2023	Apollo Ti Amo	Hiroto Yoshihara	Mamoru Tanaka	Apollo Thoroughbred Club	1:28.4
2024	Herrschaft	Hiroto Yoshihara	Yuji Uchikoshi	Kajimoto Holdings Co Ltd	1:28.3
2025	Lord In Fight	Eita Inoue	Yuji Uchikoshi	Lord Horse Club Co Ltd	1:30.3

== Past winners ==
Past winners include:

- 1978: Golden Tateyama
- 1979: Verdun Day
- 1980: Shinwaxy
- 1982: Espata Kashi
- 1983: Center Takashi
- 1984: Takashi Boy
- 1985: Gama el sid
- 1986: Yoshikatsu Shingek
- 1987: Hyshino Levin
- 1988: Nippo Swallow
- 1989: Nippo Swallow
- 1990: Nippo Swallow
- 1991: Daitaku Yuji
- 1992: Marble Winter
- 1993: Hagino Millionaire
- 1994: Carrot Ski
- 1995: Rainbow Ginza
- 1996: Cross Ocean
- 1997: Super Play
- 1998: Marquis Kyu
- 1999: Bridge Teio
- 2000: Matikanehosimaturi
- 2001: Eishin Grants
- 2002: Eishin Dothan
- 2003: Namura Kokuo
- 2004: Strong Boss
- 2005: Strong Boss
- 2006: Cage Airfleet
- 2007: Tosaroran
- 2008: Tosaroran
- 2009: Spinal Code
- 2010: Sauro Bisty
- 2011: Planet World
- 2012: Reward Arion
- 2013: Fire Float

== See also ==
- Horse racing in Japan
- List of Japanese flat horse races
