= Maiden race =

Horse racing term

In horse racing, a maiden race is an event for horses that have not won a race. Horses that have not won a race are referred to as maidens. Maiden horse races are held over a variety of distances and under conditions with eligibility based on the sex or age of the horse. Races may be handicaps, set weights, or weight for age. In many countries, maiden races are the lowest level of class and represent an entry point into a racing career. In countries such as the United States, maiden special weight races rank above claiming races, while maiden claiming races allow the horse to be claimed (bought) by another owner.

== Eligibility ==
Generally, horses have to be maidens (non-winners) at the time of the race. In regions where jumping races take place, flat racing and jumps racing are sometimes treated as two distinct forms of racing and winning in one category does not preclude a horse entering a maiden in the other. For example, a horse can win multiple jumps races and still be eligible to enter maiden flat races if they have not won a race on the flat. Likewise, flat race winners are eligible to enter hurdle or steeple maidens if they have not won the relevant type of jumps race.

== Famous maiden horses ==
Numerous famous horses have commenced racing in maiden events before graduation through the classes of racing. Most horses either win their maiden or are retired from racing if they are unable to do so. Some horses though have lengthy careers as maidens and become famous for their lack of success.

Zippy Chippy is among the most famous maidens of all time, having 100 starts without winning, although placing 30 times and earning over $30,000 in prize money.

In Australia, Vote For Lust won a competition run by betting exchange Betfair to find the country's worst racehorse, resulting in Betfair sponsoring the nine-year-old. As of 17 May 2012, Vote For Lust had raced 86 times without winning (placing 10 times and earning over $20,000 in prize money), but, as a result of the publicity generated from his accolade, Melbourne Cup winning jockey Glen Boss agreed to ride the horse in its 87th start. Vote For Lust retired as a maiden with 90 starts.

Other horses with long losing streaks include Dance Saber (0 wins for 229 starts, Japan), Namino Hana (0 wins for 198 starts, Japan), Meine Attrice (0 for 192 starts, Japan), Speed Over (0 for 189, Japan), Kammuri Holder (0 for 179, Japan), Osan Tsuyoshi (0 for 164, Japan), Hakuho Queen (0 for 161, Japan), Dona Chepa (0 for 135, Puerto Rico), Ouroene (0 for 124, Australia), Haru Urara (0 for 113, Japan), Thrust (0 for 105, North America) and Quixall Crossett (0 for 103, Britain).
