= José Herrera (outfielder, born 1972) =

Dominican baseball player (born 1972)

- Right fielder
- Born: August 30, 1972 (age 53); Santo Domingo, Dominican Republic
- Batted: Left Threw: Left

Professional debut
- MLB: August 12, 1995, for the Oakland Athletics
- KBO: April 6, 2001, for the SK Wverns

Last appearance
- MLB: September 29, 1996, for the Oakland Athletics
- KBO: July 28, 2002, for the Lotte Giants

MLB statistics
- Batting average: .264
- Home runs: 6
- Runs batted in: 32

KBO statistics
- Batting average: .328
- Home runs: 2
- Runs batted in: 21
- Stats at Baseball Reference

Teams
- Oakland Athletics (1995–1996); SK Wyverns (2001); Lotte Giants (2002)

José Ramón Herrera Catalino (born August 30, 1972) is a Dominican former professional baseball outfielder. He played parts of two seasons in Major League Baseball for the Oakland Athletics (1995–96). He also played in the Korea Baseball Organization in 2001–02. In 2010, he played for the York Revolution of the Atlantic League of Professional Baseball and in the minor leagues for the Toronto Blue Jays and Baltimore Orioles.

== Career ==
In 1993, Herrera was traded by the Toronto Blue Jays along with pitcher Steve Karsay to the Oakland Athletics for Major League Baseball's all-time stolen base leader, Rickey Henderson, who helped Toronto win the 1993 World Series. He played in 141 games in the majors for the Oakland Athletics in 1995 and 1996, his only major league action. He played in the minors for Oakland through 1997, and joined the Blue Jays organization again in 1998, playing for the Syracuse SkyChiefs.

In 1999, Herrera signed with the Baltimore Orioles organization and was assigned to their Triple-A affiliate. While playing for the Rochester Red Wings, Herrera outran Zippy Chippy in a 40-yard race on August 18, 2000. A famous thoroughbred racing loser, Zippy Chippy went winless in 100 races. In three tries against a human, he beat Red Wings' outfielders Darnell McDonald and Larry Bigbie, but lost to Herrera.

In 2001, Herrera played in Korea for the SK Wyverns of the Korea Baseball Organization, and in 2002 he played for the Lotte Giants. In 2003 and 2004 he played for the Leones de Yucatan of the Mexican League. In 2005, he briefly played for the Orioles Double-A affiliate, the Bowie Baysox, before being released and signing with the Newark Bears.

=== Atlantic League ===
After his 106 games stint for the Newark Bears of the Atlantic League of Professional Baseball, Herrera played for Newark from 2006 to 2008, and batted .305, .357, and .331. He is currently the team's all-time leader in at bats with 1470, hits with 482, doubles with 78, RBIs with 259 and runs with 248. He was named MVP of the Atlantic League playoffs in 2007 when he hit 3 home runs against the Somerset Patriots in the deciding game four in Newark on September 24, 2007, helping guide the Bears to their second league championship.

Herrera played with the Long Island Ducks in 2009 before being acquired the Revolution for third baseman Matt Padgett. He became a free agent after the 2010 season.

He signed a contract with the Southern Maryland Blue Crabs on January 13, 2011.
