= Haru Urara (Umamusume: Pretty Derby) =

Umamusume: Pretty Derby character

- Umamusume: Pretty Derby character
- Haru Urara in the Umamusume: Pretty Derby video game
- Based on: Haru Urara
- Voiced by: Yukina Shuto

In-universe information
- Nationality: Japanese

Haru Urara (Japanese: ハルウララ) is a character in the multimedia franchise Umamusume: Pretty Derby. She is one of multiple anthropomorphic horse girls who compete in races with each other. Urara has pink hair and is noticeably shorter than her competitors, and is voiced by Yukina Shuto. She appears in multiple incarnations, including a video game, where she is the slowest character.

Haru Urara is based on the real-life horse of the same name, who became famous in Japan for her losing streak. This caused people to view her as a symbol of never giving up, and her popularity ensured that she could retire instead of being killed despite her poor performance, which was common at the time she raced.

When the Umamusume game released globally with an English server, she experienced a boost in popularity, and received an abundance of donations of ryegrass that were so abundant as to crash the donation website. The character is among the most popular in the game, and she received fanart depicting various events around the horse, including the donations and memorializing the horse after her death in September 2025.

== Concept and creation ==
Haru Urara is an anthropomorphic horse girl with pink hair in a ponytail, a ribbon earring in her right ear, horse ears, and a horse tail, both of which are also pink. She wears a tracksuit over gym clothing, and has bandages on her legs. She notably underperforms compared to other racers, though has a "bubbly, positive, can-do attitude" and is friends with her competitors. She is voiced in Japanese by Yukina Shuto.

Haru Urara is based on the real horse of the same name, whose name means "gentle spring". This horse participated in 113 races from 1998 to 2004 without winning any, with her best performance in these races being second place. It was common practice at the time for horses who perform poorly to be killed, and Haru Urara was at risk of being killed back in June 2003. Her trainer at the time, Dai Muneishi, found the idea objectionable. Her survival was owed to a surge in popularity around her 80th loss. She became famous, becoming a "national symbol of perseverance in the face of adversity" and being complimented by former Japanese prime minister Junichiro Koizumi. In the last years of her racing career, a "Haru Boom" occurred, where fans would visit from across Japan to see her and buy merchandise based on her. Losing Haru Urara betting slips would also be used as good luck charms to ward off traffic accidents. Like the real horse, Haru is smaller than average compared to the other racers in Umamusume. Unlike most other racers, whose hair color is typically based on the fur of their real-world inspirations, Haru's pink hair is instead based on the horse's distinctive pink racing mask, decorated with images of Sanrio character Hello Kitty. The horse died on September 9, 2025, of colic.

== Appearances ==
Haru Urara appears in Umamusume: Pretty Derby as one of multiple anthropomorphic horse girls who race against each other. Like her real-world counterpart, Haru Urara, she underperforms in races. This is due in part to her ill-suited qualities; while she specializes in sprints and dirt tracks, she typically races longer races on a turf track. Despite not ranking well, the game has a training scenario that features a race with her and other racers making their debut, which makes it easier for her to win. She is considered a good fit for beginner players. Haru Urara has multiple relationships in the game, including Rice Shower, who she offers words of support, and her roommate, King Halo, who often worries over Haru Urara. In addition to her default outfit, a version of her wearing a furisode was added to the game.

Haru Urara appeared in the game Shadowverse as a crossover between it and Umamusume. She has also received multiple pieces of merchandise, including a plush and clothing.

== Reception ==
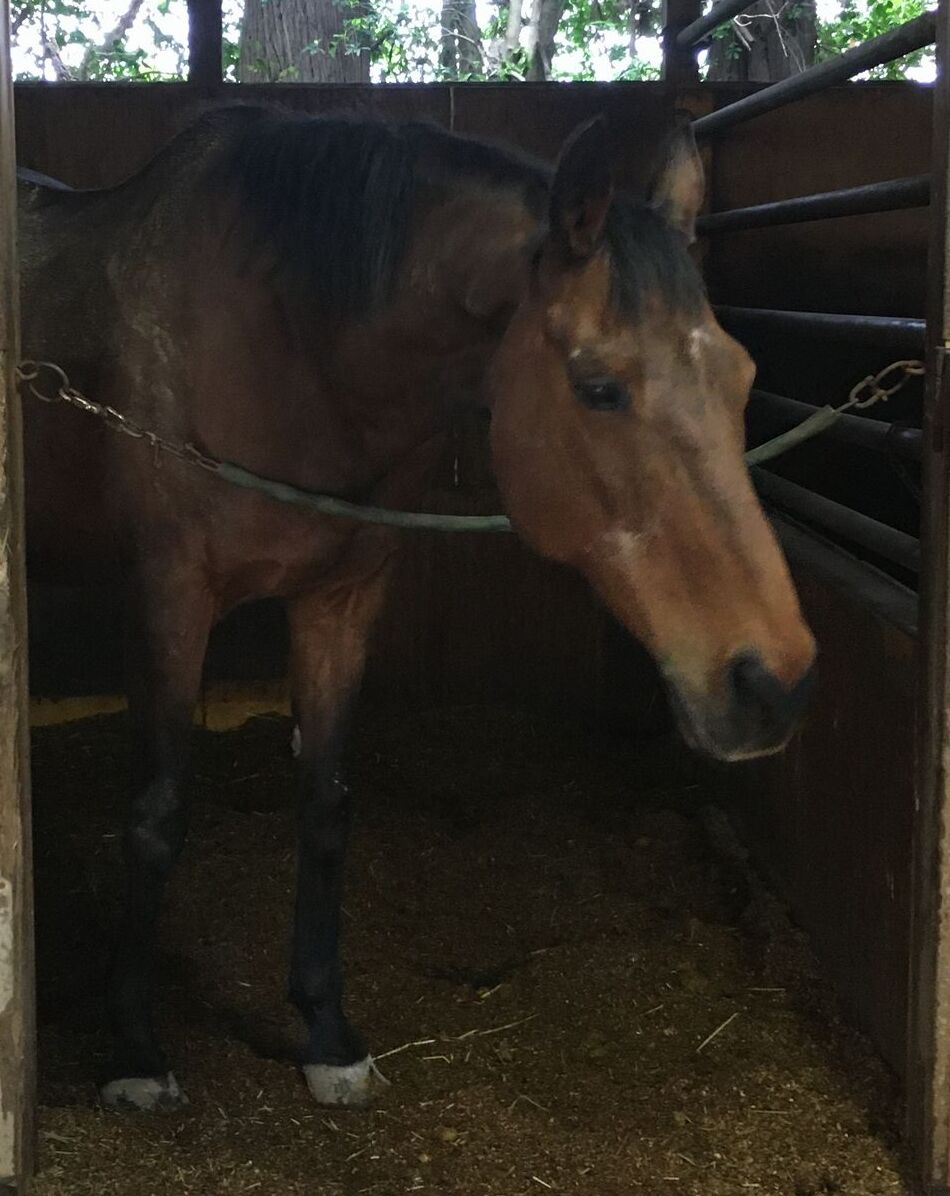
The real horse Haru Urara experienced a boost in popularity overseas thanks to the release of Umamusume

Haru Urara has received generally positive reception, developing a strong fan following and a cosplay scene. Following the English release of Umamusume, she became popular on English social media. Den Fami Nico Gamer staff noted that both English and Japanese players showed interest in helping her win a race. She is among the most popular characters for English players of the game. The character was also the subject of memes, becoming a symbol among fans for never giving up. Game Watch writer Nikkata found her design "majestic", though mainly praised her personality, particularly how positive, innocent, and pure she was. They enjoyed one of her songs, stating that while it is fairly different from Haru Urara's personality, they appreciated the gap between her singing and her normal personality, stating that it made them like her more.

Due to her popularity with Umamusume fans following the video game's global release, the real horse experienced an increase in popularity herself. This was seen on social media websites such as Twitter/X, where content about the horse suddenly began getting more engagement following the global release. After a service was promoted to purchase ryegrass for the real horse's consumption on social media following the English release, the service reported a significant outpouring of support, totaling 2340 kilograms as of July 18, 2025. The service stated that this was more than they should ship at a time, and commented that this showed the love for horses across the world. The volume of donations caused the website to crash. The event elicited a series of fan art depicting the character with an abundance of ryegrass. After the passing of the real-world Haru Urara, many people created fan art of the character to pay their respects. Aftermath writer Nathan Grayson felt uncomfortable about the veneration of Haru Urara as a symbol of losing without giving up, stating that "[Haru Urara] suffered to make money for a bunch of different people, only to be declared an inspiration for never giving up despite her apparent desire to be doing anything else." He also considered the admiration of the horse by fans of the Umamusume character parasocial, believing that it may obscure the "wants and needs of real animals trapped in a broken system."
