= Jellyfish Can't Swim in the Night =

Japanese anime television series

- Anime key visual featuring the four main characters

夜のクラゲは泳げない (Yoru no Kurage wa Oyogenai)
- Created by: JELEE
- Anime television series
- Directed by: Ryōhei Takeshita
- Written by: Yūki Yaku
- Music by: Masaru Yokoyama
- Studio: Doga Kobo
- Licensed by: Sentai Filmworks (Note: Home video rights through Section23 Films and streaming rights through Hidive.): SA/SEA: Muse Communication
- Original network: Tokyo MX, Kansai TV, BS11, AT-X, HTB
- Original run: April 7, 2024 – June 23, 2024
- Episodes: 12
- Manga
- Written by: JELEE
- Illustrated by: Niko Fujii
- Published by: Kodansha
- Magazine: Magazine Pocket
- Original run: April 7, 2024 – December 1, 2024
- Volumes: 4
- Light novel
- Written by: Yūki Yaku
- Illustrated by: popman3580
- Published by: Shogakukan
- Imprint: Gagaga Bunko
- Original run: May 20, 2024 – July 18, 2024
- Volumes: 3
- icon

Jellyfish Can't Swim in the Night (Japanese: 夜のクラゲは泳げない, Hepburn: Yoru no Kurage wa Oyogenai), abbreviated as YoruKura (ヨルクラ), is an original anime television series produced by Doga Kobo for its 50th anniversary. Set in Shibuya, this series follows four Japanese girls, an illustrator, an idol, a music composer, and a VTuber, who form the band JELEE to become a global phenomenon.

The series was directed by Ryōhei Takeshita and aired from April to June 2024. A manga adaptation illustrated by Niko Fujii was serialized on Kodansha's Magazine Pocket manga website from April to December 2024. The series is licensed in North America and Australia by Sentai Filmworks and is streaming through its Hidive platform.

== Plot ==
Four girls, Mahiru Kouzuki, an illustrator who stops drawing, Kano Yamanouchi, a former idol who wants to prove herself with singing, Nox Ryūgasaki, the self-proclaimed "strongest" VTuber, and Kimura-chan, a mysterious composer who wants to support her favorite person, together form an anonymous artist group, JELEE.

== Characters ==
=== JELEE ===
Mahiru Kōzuki (光月 まひる, Kōzuki Mahiru) / Yoru Umitsuki (海月 ヨル, Umitsuki Yoru)
Voiced by: Miku Itō (Japanese); Luci Christian (English)
A 16-year-old high school student who loves drawing but stopped out of the fear of being ridiculed. She returns to drawing after meeting Kano, and serves as JELEE's illustrator.
Kano Yamanouchi (山ノ内 花音, Yamanouchi Kano) / Nonoka Tachibana (橘 ののか, Tachibana Nonoka)
Voiced by: Rie Takahashi (Japanese); Juliet Simmons (English)
A 17-year-old former member of Sunflower Dolls who worked as its center but was forced to retire after a scandal. She has been working as a cover singer, and serves as JELEE's vocalist and lyricist.
Kiui Watase (渡瀬 キウイ, Watase Kiui) / Nox Ryūgasaki (竜ヶ崎 ノクス, Ryūgasaki Nokusu)
Voiced by: Miyu Tomita (Japanese); Molly Searcy (English)
A VTuber and childhood friend of Mahiru who lives as a shut-in after realizing she cannot fit in with her prep school. She lends her talents to JELEE as its video editor and mixer. She publicly expresses her gender fluidity in the eleventh episode, criticizing those who want her to behave in a "normal" manner, unashamed for embracing what she likes.
Mei Kim Anouk Takanashi (高梨・キム・アヌーク・めい, Takanashi Kimu Anūku Mei) / Kimura-chan (木村ちゃん)
Voiced by: Miyuri Shimabukuro (Japanese); Natalie Rial (English)
A 17-year-old high school student who takes up professional piano lessons and is a super fan of Kano as she helped her go through her social anxieties. She serves as JELEE's composer.

=== Entertainment industry ===
Shizue Baba (馬場 静江, Baba Shizue) / Miiko (みー子, Mīko)
Voiced by: Sumire Uesaka
An underground idol singer who has been working for 14 years and is a single mother to Ariel.
Mero Setō (瀬藤 メロ, Setō Mero)
Voiced by: Miho Okasaki (Japanese); Karlii Hoch (English)
The new center of Sunflower Dolls after Kano's retirement.
Momoko Yanagi (柳 桃子, Yanagi Momoko)
Voiced by: Yukina Shuto
A member of Sunflower Dolls.
Akari Suzumura (鈴村 あかり, Suzumura Akari)
Voiced by: Sally Amaki
A member of Sunflower Dolls.
Yukine Hayakawa (早川 雪音, Hayakawa Yukine)
Voiced by: Yūko Kaida (Japanese); Patricia Duran (English)
The producer for Sunflower Dolls, who is also Kano and Mion's estranged mother.

=== Other characters ===
Kaho Kōzuki (光月 佳歩, Kōzuki Kaho)
Voiced by: Ayu Matsuura
Mahiru's younger sister.
Mion Hayakawa (早川 美音, Hayakawa Mion)
Voiced by: Chika Anzai
Kano's older sister.
Ariel Baba (馬場 亜璃恵瑠, Baba Arieru)
Voiced by: Nao Tōyama
Shizue's daughter who passionately supports her mother's activities.
Koharu (小春)
Voiced by: Asami Seto (Japanese); Emi Lo (English)
A woman who Kano and Kiui met at a motorcycle riding school and has gone through multiple plastic surgeries.
Ship Manager Honami (保奈美店長, Honami-tenchō)
Voiced by: Hekiru Shiina
The manager of the bar Mahiru and Kano work part-time in.

== Production and release ==
On March 24, 2023, Doga Kobo announced it was producing an original television anime series titled Jellyfish Can't Swim in the Night, which would be scheduled to premiere in 2024, with its story taking place in Shibuya. Later, three more batches of teaser PVs and teaser visuals were released on May 12, July 28, and October 23, 2023, respectively. According to director Ryōhei Takeshita, the teaser PVs were produced in live action, mainly because he did not want to strain the resources from the production of the anime series, and partly because he wanted to attempt to create something in live action. On November 1, 2023, its first fully animated PV was released, together with cast and staff announced, as well as the series' premiere in April 2024. On February 7, 2024, the second PV was released, as well as the series' premiere on April 7. (Note: Tokyo MX lists the series premiere at 25:00 on April 6, 2024, which is effectively 1:00 a.m. JST on April 7.)

An advance screening of the first two episodes was held on March 3, 2024, at Marunouchi Piccadilly, Tokyo, with live broadcast in four cinemas in Saitama, Aichi, Osaka, and Miyazaki respectively.

The screenwriter, Yūki Yaku, the art director, Yūji Kaneko, and the editor, Kashiko Kimura were all invited by Ryōhei Takeshita to the crew. Ryōhei Takeshita said the production of the anime has been completed already on Twitter on April 11, 2024.

== Media ==
=== Anime ===
The series is created by JELEE, and takes place in Shibuya, Tokyo. Produced by Doga Kobo, it is directed by Ryōhei Takeshita, with series composition by Yūki Yaku, original character designs by popman3580, and designs adapted for animation by Junichirō Taniguchi. The series aired from April 7 to June 23, 2024, on Tokyo MX and other networks. The opening theme is "Irodori" (イロドリ; "Color"), performed by KanoeRana, while the ending theme is "Ichi-nichi wa 25-jikan" (1日は25時間; "25 Hours in a Day"), performed by Anna Tsurushima. The series is licensed by Sentai Filmworks in North America, Australia, and British Isles. Muse Communication licensed the series in Asia-Pacific.

==== Episodes ====
No.	Title (Note: All English titles are taken from HIDIVE.)	Directed by (Note: Information is taken from the ending credits of each episode.)	Storyboarded by	Original release date
1	"Jellyfish in the Night"; Transliteration: "Yoru no Kurage" (Japanese: 夜のクラゲ)	Ryōhei Takeshita	Ryōhei Takeshita	April 7, 2024
Mahiru Kouzuki wakes up to her little sister filming her. She takes her sister's phone, deletes the video and heads to class. At school, it is revealed that Mahiru is regarded as an illustrator. While her classmates praise her talent, Mahiru herself does not believe she has any noteworthy artistic ability. At night she heads out and walks through Shibuya. She talks to her friend, the school council president, over the phone. They discuss their futures and Mahiru says she does not want to be a corporate worker and is unsure about her future. While walking by a jellyfish mural, it is revealed in a flashback that Mahiru painted the mural as a child. When she was a child, she excitedly showed her friends the mural, but they made fun of her artwork. Embarrassed, Mahiru hid that she drew the mural and quit being an artist. In the present, a performer places posters on Mahiru's mural, and a girl heckles the performer for doing so. Mahiru is shocked that someone actually liked her art and follows the girl. After they talk, the girl is revealed to be Kano Yamanouchi, a former idol. Kano tells Mahiru that her mural is one of her favorite pieces of art, and she invites Mahiru to collaborate with her music group "JELEE". Mahiru says that she is not confident enough to do so and leaves. At home, Mahiru learns that Kano had to quit her idol group after being accused of assaulting a coworker. She is shocked that Kano is able to continue working as a performance artist despite the public humiliation, and admires how strong she is. Later on, during Halloween, the two run into each other again. Kano manages to convince Mahiru to collaborate after singing in front of the jellyfish mural and tearing down the posters that were defacing the mural. While Kano's performance is live streamed, another girl is shown to be watching intently.
2	"Mei the Fangirl"; Transliteration: "Mei no Oshigoto" (Japanese: めいの推しごと)	Mitsuhiro Ōsako	Ryōhei Takeshita	April 14, 2024
A girl is shown preparing to play the piano in front of a panel of judges. Mahiru is in her room and feels embarrassed about her decision to join JELEE on the livestream. Mahiru's younger sister notices that Mahiru has started illustrating again. Working at a cafe, Kano and Mahiru strategize on their approach to making JELEE a success. Mahiru decides they need another member capable of composing music. Kano and Mahiru discuss financing and realize they need 900,000 yen to fund their artist group. A superfan of Kano named Mei enters the cafe and offers Kano 100,000 yen. Mei explains she recognized Kano from the livestream and insists Kano return to the idol industry. Kano rebuffs Mei and hands her the money back, stating that she is done with the idol industry. Heading back home with Mahiru, Kano realizes that her bag and Mei's got swapped. Mei's bag contained a cover of Kano's music, and they realize that Mei is a great musician. Kano, Mahiru, and Mei meet up once more. Mei offers to write music for Kano on the condition that she sings as an idol, not as JELEE's vocalist. In a flashback, it is shown that Mei was actually a girl named Kim who had trouble making friends when she was in middle school. It is shown that Kano's idol persona helped Kim get through her troubles. Kano and Mahiru show up at Mei's piano exam. After the performance, Kano calls Mei by her real name, Kimura. After realizing that Kano truly cares about her, beyond just her idol persona, she stops feeling alone. Mei Kim officially joins JELEE afterwards as their music composer.
3	"Kiui Watase"; Transliteration: "Watase Kiui" (Japanese: 渡瀬キウイ)	Yasufumi Soejima	Yasufumi Soejima	April 21, 2024
A VTuber is shown livestreaming from her bedroom; she ends the stream and sighs afterward. Mahiru, Kano, and Mei gather at the cafe to discuss JELEE's future direction. Mei shares her music, and Mahiru presents her illustration for the promotional art. Mahiru dances to Mei's music, sparking an idea in Kano's mind. Kano believes that having Mahiru's drawing move in sync with her actual dancing in the music video would be amusing. Mahiru tells Kano that they can reach out to her VTuber friend who specializes in streaming as a character model. They talk to the VTuber on a video call and Mahiru introduces her as Kiui, a childhood friend that she has always looked up to. The girls request Kiui's help in animating Mahiru's illustration for the MV, and she agrees. It is revealed that Kiui has a lot of free time due to living as a shut-in, spending entire nights streaming instead of sleeping. Several of Kiui's classmates show up to the festival, and Mahiru learns that Kiui no longer attends school. After Mahiru brings it up in one of their calls, Kiui abruptly ends the call in anger. A flashback reveals that Kiui did not fit in well with her elite prep school student body. She eventually started secluding herself from the outside world. At Mahiru's school festival, she decides to stream her performance to Kiui. The theme of the play involves dancing to try and convince a shut-in goddess to come out. Mahiru's acting serves as both a school play event and a personal plea to Kiui to stop secluding herself. Kiui delivers the music video, and the girls are impressed. Mahiru also assures Kiui that she does not mind if Kiui secludes herself, emphasizing that Kiui is still a very cool person to her. During a stream, Kiui plays JELEE's music video to promote the group. Later on, Kiui goes outside and finally meets Mahiru in person for the first time in two years.
4	"Double A-Side"; Transliteration: "Ryou A Men" (Japanese: 両A面)	Yoshiyuki Shirahata	Tetsuto Saito	April 28, 2024
Mero from "The Sunflower Dolls" discusses their return to the idol scene during a televised interview. Mahiru is thrilled that JELEE's MV has reached 10,000 views. Although Kano is not as enthusiastic, she acknowledges that the result surpasses her first solo cover as JELEE. Since Mei is struggling with music software, the group decides to meet at Kano's apartment to collaborate. Guided by the producer Yukine, The Sunflower Dolls strive to promote their group. The group members discuss the scandal that happened two years ago. At Kano's apartment, Kiui explains to Mei how music software works, and the group has an icebreaker over pizza. Kano discusses their schedule, but the other members push back as the schedule feels unrealistic for those still going to school. Departing in frustration, Kano's emotional departure prompts the other girls to recognize her desire to match the pace of her former idol group. They meet Kano's older sister, Mion, who explains that the producer of The Sunflower Dolls is actually their mother. Mei and Kiui find Kano, and they return to her apartment. Everyone works together late into the night on JELEE's new MV, which they release early in the morning. After resting, the girls are shocked that their new MV has blown up and gained a huge following.
5	"Viewer Comments"; Transliteration: "Comment Ran" (Japanese: コメント欄)	Ryûta Kawahara	Ryûta Kawahara	May 5, 2024
It is revealed that JELEE's MV became popular because Mahiru uploaded the incorrect file. Consequently, JELEE's song gained popularity not for its quality, but rather for its eccentricity. Kiui emphasizes that even unconventional publicity benefits an indie music group. Mahiru is elated by their newfound popularity and obsessively checks online comments. She starts to feel a bit uneasy when people online question the quality of her illustrations. Mei, Kano and Mahiru notice that a famous online illustrator drew fan art of Mahiru's art. After seeing the picture, Mahiru begins to feel inadequate. She realizes that the fan art is far more popular than her original illustration. Sensing Mahiru's distress, Kano visits her at home to offer support. Mahiru confides that she feels like an imposter given how talented the other three members of JELEE are. In comparison, Mahiru feels that she is just an ordinary high school girl who likes drawing as a hobby. After Kano leaves, Mahiru also acknowledges to herself that she resents that a very talented artist drew her own character better. Kano and Mahiru meet up and have a heartfelt conversation at an aquarium. Mahiru resolves to improve her illustrations and live up to her own expectations. She goes all out and draws her best illustration yet. JELEE releases another MV, this time garnering popularity based on its own merits. The girls celebrate New Year's together, and each of them makes a wish at the shrine. While lying on the snow, Kano kisses Mahiru on the cheek. Mahiru awkwardly brushes it off.
6	"31 (Thirty-One)"; Transliteration: "Sātiwan" (Japanese: 31(サーティワン))	Kinako Goma	Masako Sato	May 12, 2024
Kano struggles to write lyrics for JELEE's latest MV. Kiui suggests JELEE take a commission from an underground idol who sent in a request. After meeting the commissioner, Miiko, they discover that she is 31 years old. Miiko faces pressure from her production company due to her age and waning popularity. She was told that she would be let go from her position if her next song fails to garner any popularity. Kano is apprehensive about taking on the commission. Miiko reminds the girls that they used her livestream as a stepping stone for JELEE. Feeling coerced, the girls agree to compose a song for her. They shadow Miiko to understand her daily life for song inspiration. Miiko introduces her daughter, Ariel Baba, to the girls. At home, Kano feels a bit unnerved at the happy relationship she saw between Ariel and Miiko. Kano confides to Mahiru that her own mother was never very close to her. Kano believes her mother only cared about her when she was an idol. Mei and Ariel talk about how people look down on Ariel's mother but that Ariel is still her biggest fan. Miiko is scheduled to perform at a venue, and Ariel tells her that she will be there to watch. Ariel visits a shrine first with her friends. While at the shrine, several boys from her school make fun of her and her mother. The boys post comments online on Miiko's videos. After realizing that her daughter is being bullied, Miiko skips out on the performance and goes to find Ariel. JELEE is left hanging, and the venue manager asks them to take Miiko's spot. The boys run off when Miiko shows up. Ariel tells her mom that she should not skip work. JELEE covers for Miiko and puts on a performance in the meantime. After Miiko heads back, she tells the audience her real name, Shizue Baba, her real age, and that she has a daughter. Her fans are conflicted, but Miiko resolves to continue as an idol and win them over. A few days later, it is revealed that Miiko's video has hit 820,000 views and that she has become popular.
7	"Daybreak"; Transliteration: "Yoake" (Japanese: 夜明け)	Yoshiyuki Shirahata	Yoshiyuki Shirahata	May 19, 2024
The girls discuss their post-high school plans. Kano realizes everyone plans to attend university, although she is still unsure. Kano decides to get a motorbike license with Kiui. While practicing, Kiui meets an older woman, Koharu. That night, Kiui explains to Kano why she wants to become a teacher. She wants to be a teacher who accepts students' interests and supports lonely students. Kano reassures Kiui that she is not alone and understands her goal. In the morning, Kiui goes to school to pick up documents. At school, she realizes she still does not fit in and hates the atmosphere. She leaves, acknowledging the world is still tough. Back at the driving school, Koharu tells Kiui and Kano about her extensive cosmetic surgery. Koharu explains that she had breast implants and several surgeries on her face. Kano and Kiui are left shocked by the revelation. During a bath, Koharu advises Kano on riding a motorbike. Kano passes the practical exam but fails the written portion. On a repeated try, she manages to obtain the license. Mahiru decides that she wants to go to art school and become an illustrator. Kano picks up Mahiru, and they go for a bike ride. After they arrive at a beach, they sit down and have a talk. Mahiru explains she wants to attend art school to improve and impress her supporters. While not stating it outright, Mahiru places emphasis on Kano as her biggest supporter. Kano tells Mahiru that she is still unsure about her future or why she sings. Mahiru tells her that she wants Kano to sing for her. Later, Kano receives demerit points for driving with a passenger in her first year.
8	"Covert Gig"; Transliteration: "Kasou Raibu" (Japanese: カソウライブ)	Yasufumi Soejima	Yasufumi Soejima	May 26, 2024
A man watching a clip of JELEE's undercover performance realizes that Kano is a former idol. The team decides to hold a live performance. They agree to wear masks to keep JELEE anonymous. Since the performance requires a new song, the JELEE members have a work-focused sleepover. Mei finds a hotel, and the girls meet up. Mahiru informs Mei she accidentally booked a love hotel, but the girls are satisfied. Kano suggests making an updated print of Mahiru's mural to use as part of their costumes. Kano also brings up the theme she would like to convey with their performance: a sense of togetherness. As the live event is announced, JELEE tells the audience to only bring blue glow sticks. After setting a date, the girls spend the week rehearsing. While practicing, Kano comes up with another idea. She sends a follow-up request to JELEE's fans asking them to bring a blue umbrella as well. Before the event, someone online exposes Kano as a former idol, leaving her in shock. JELEE becomes a hot topic online, and many attack the group due to Kano's history. The performance venue considers canceling their contract due to online threats. After the girls plead and change the performance to be audience-free, the venue manager agrees not to cancel. Two months later, JELEE holds their performance. Kiui projects popular JEELE fan art at the venue, bringing Kano's theme of togetherness to life. The performance is a huge success and well received, with a huge number of likes and an increase in followers. Kano's mother, who saw the performance, sends Mahiru a commission request. She asks that Mahiru makes illustrations for the idol group Sunflower Dolls.
9	"Take a Look at Reality"; Transliteration: "Genjitsu Miro" (Japanese: 現実見ろ)	Ryûta Kawahara	Ryûta Kawahara	June 2, 2024
In a flashback, Kano says she aspires to be like her mother. In the present, JELEE rejoices over reaching 100,000 followers. Mahiru tells Kiui about the commission offer she received. She says that while it is a challenging role, she wants to go for it. Mahiru visits Mei to inquire about Kano's mother. Mei gives her a thorough history of Yukine's work. Mei also tentatively reveals that Yukine may be behind an online account exposing idols. Mahiru tells Kano over the phone that Yukine sent her a commission request. Kano recommends Mahiru not take the commission but does not explain why. Mahiru, feeling conflicted, decides to meet Yukine before making a decision. During their meeting, Yukine explains the project, and Mahiru realizes the massive scale behind it. Yukine says Mahiru's work was inspirational, which was the primary reason for her choice. Yukine adds that Mahiru is rapidly improving and will meet her expectations. Mahiru feels a strong sense of validation and accepts the commission request. In a flashback, Kano's backstory as an idol is shown. Yukine selects Kano as the center performer because she believes Kano has a gift for singing. Kano's teammates dislike her, thinking she got her position through nepotism. A year into her idol career, Kano sees Mahiru's jellyfish mural and is moved. While rehearsing, Kano finds evidence that her teammate Mero is behind the online account "LookIdiot," which exposed idols. Realizing Mero sabotaged other performers, Kano punches her in a fit of rage. Onlookers record the fight, ending Kano's idol career and adversely impacting the group due to negative publicity. In the present, Mahiru informs JELEE she will take the commission and cannot work on the MV. Kano breaks down in tears, calls Mahiru a liar, and says she would be nothing without her. Mahiru is left heartbroken. Kano reflects that her mother saw potential in Mahiru, not her.
10	"The Idolized"; Transliteration: "Osarerugawa" (Japanese: 推される側)	Mitsuhiro Ōsako	Mitsuhiro Ōsako	June 9, 2024
Kano is unreachable, so the remaining JELEE members continue their part-time jobs. Kiui and Mei learn that Kano is afraid of singing, and Kano says her reason for singing was petty. While handing out tissues, Mei runs into Mero. Mero tries to stop Mei from following her around; however, Mei remains persistent. Mei reveals she is part of JELEE and gets Mero to stop and talk. Mero tells Mei she sings to impress Yukine. Mero also implies Kano's reason for singing is the same. Later, Mei and Kiui get fired from their part-time job for being unable to handle their work. Kano tries going to school but decides it is not a good fit for her. Mahiru refuses to help the other members of JELEE with their situation, as she is completely focused on the commission for Sunflower Dolls. Mei confronts Kano about her reason for singing. Kano admits she formed JELEE to get her mother's attention. Kano regrets her past decisions and feels she used Mahiru and the others. Kano suggests to Mei that JELEE should disband. During a livestream, Kiui tells JELEE's fans they will disband and release their final incomplete song. However, Mei does not want JELEE to disband, so she starts singing during the livestream in protest. Viewers online insult Mei's singing, but Kiui gets Kano to listen. Kano realizes she still wants JELEE to continue and resolves to keep singing. Kiui is revealed as the VTuber Nox, and someone reaches out to her.
11	"What I Love"; Transliteration: "Suki na Mono" (Japanese: 好きなもの)	Shōhei Fujita	Hajime Kawamura	June 16, 2024
Kiui's real identity is revealed, and viewers on her Vtuber livestream keep mentioning it. Frustrated, she stops the stream. Mei's outburst during JELEE's livestream gains 2.2 million views, making JELEE trend. Yukine tells Mahiru she is disappointed in her first drafts and realizes Mahiru does not like her own artwork. Mero and Mahiru discuss the "LookIdiot" account. Mahiru admits she dislikes its actions but she does not completely hate the owner. Kano tries to sing. Mei realizes Kano does not know who she is singing for, making her music sound flat. Mahiru faces a similar issue and misses Yukine's deadline. Due to time constraints, Yukine suggests Mahiru redo her art in a different style, following an editor's instructions. Mahiru initially complies but later decides to try her own style again. Kiui and Mahiru check out Mahiru's old art. Kiui admits online comments upset her, especially since her old friends found out she was a liar. Mahiru cheers Kiui up, telling her she still thinks Kiui is a hero. At the arcade, Mahiru and Kiui run into their old friends, who trash-talk Kiui, upsetting her. Kiui snaps and tells her old friends off. Kiui says she loves her online personality and will not let anyone deny her feelings. Mahiru submits the commission in her own style. Yukine is not impressed with Mahiru not following instructions, but admits the quality is good and accepts it. Mahiru then asks Yukine if JELEE can perform side by side with Sundolls at the event.
12	"JELEE"	Ryōhei Takeshita	Ryōhei Takeshita	June 23, 2024
Mahiru and Yukine discuss a JELEE and Sundolls collaboration. Mahiru explains JELEE is trending online and that their performance would attract huge crowds. Yukine points out such publicity stunts can backfire and affect Sundolls' credibility. Yukine asks Mahiru what she really wants to accomplish with the collaboration. Kiui receives Yukine's proposal to collaborate for the event. Kano agrees to the proposal. The day of the event arrives, and everyone prepares for their performance. Kano is concerned about the performance as she still does not have a reason to sing. Mei and Kiui reassure her that she will do well. The event starts, and Kano freezes, confusing the viewers. Mero tells Kano to look ahead at the art Mahiru illustrated. Seeing her goal of creating an aquarium in Shibuya come to life, Kano starts singing. The performance is a resounding success, realizing Kano's vision for JELEE. After the performance, Mahiru and Kano reunite and embrace. The two spend some time talking about their experiences before the event. Kano explains that she finally found a reason to sing. Kano wants to help people move forward and find joy in their lives. The event credits play, and Kano is moved that her mother used her real name instead of her stage name. Some time passes, and Mahiru takes an exam to enroll in art school. Mahiru, Mei, and Kano graduate high school while Kiui continues streaming. The members of JELEE meet up in front of Mahiru's jellyfish mural. They decide to repaint the mural. While painting, they agree to continue their music group and vow to stay together.

=== Manga ===
A manga adaptation illustrated by Niko Fujii was serialized on Kodansha's Magazine Pocket manga website from April 7 to December 1, 2024. Four tankōbon volumes have been released.

No.	Release date	ISBN
1	May 16, 2024	978-4-06-535541-1
2	July 17, 2024	978-4-06-536131-3
3	September 17, 2024	978-4-06-536770-4
4	December 17, 2024	978-4-06-537439-9

=== Light novel ===
A light novel adaptation, written by Yūki Yaku and illustrated by popman3580, was published in three volumes under Shogakukan's Gagaga Bunko imprint from May 20 to July 18, 2024.

No.	Release date	ISBN
1	May 20, 2024	978-4-09-453191-6
2	June 18, 2024	978-4-09-453194-7
3	July 18, 2024	978-4-09-453200-5

== Reception ==
The anime series' first episode garnered generally positive reviews from Anime News Network's staff during the Spring 2024 season previews. James Beckett gave high praise to Yoru and Kano's "immediately compelling relationship" and the overall production for displaying the characters' "weight and heft" during the musical and dramatic scenes. Richard Eisenbeis praised the overarching plot involving Yoru's crippling peer pressure and her interactions with Kano, saying "all signs point to this being a journey worth watching." Rebecca Silverman was critical of the show's "meandering conversations" over "highly symbolic images" and unsure if it can sustain this storytelling style, but was optimistic for Yoru's artistic rediscovery and relationship with Kano. Nicholas Dupree was critical of the show spelling out its characters' problems by hammering them with "blunt metaphors", but gave praise to the visual artistry for its nighttime Shibuya backgrounds and showing "elastic vibrancy" in the character designs, saying "Jellyfish is playing with ideas and themes that I love and clearly has the artistic ambition to make the journey a pleasant one. I can forgive a few fumbles when a show is this earnest and delightful."

Zhang Yi from The paper stated that after the "stunning" first episode, "the plot of the whole anime steadily declined in quality." Describing the first episode of the series as a "fraud", he criticized the anime as trapped in the awkward position of being "dreamy, yet not dreamy enough", and failing to deliver pure relaxation while rendering the narrative conflicts overly superficial.

At the 9th Crunchyroll Anime Awards in 2025, the series was nominated for Best Original Anime, ultimately losing to Ninja Kamui.

== See also ==
- Eromanga Sensei, Pokémon: Paldean Winds – anime series directed by Ryōhei Takeshita
- Bottom-tier Character Tomozaki – light novel series written by Yūki Yaku
