= Yukina Shuto =

Japanese voice actress

- 首藤 志奈
- Born: 19 December; Ōita Prefecture, Japan
- Occupations: Voice actress; singer
- Years active: 2018–present
- Notable work: Haru Urara in Umamusume: Pretty Derby; Shizuku Hyōdō in Idoly Pride; Orphia in Seirei Gensouki: Spirit Chronicles; Shirayuki Himeji in Liar, Liar
- Musical career
- Instrument: Vocals
- Member of: Prima Porta

Yukina Shuto (首藤 志奈, Shutō Yukina; born 19 December) is a Japanese voice actress and singer from Ōita Prefecture affiliated with Raccoon Dog. She is known for voicing Haru Urara in Umamusume: Pretty Derby, Shizuku Hyōdō in Idoly Pride, Orphia in Seirei Gensouki: Spirit Chronicles, Mahiru Mizuhara in World's End Harem, and Shirayuki Himeji in Liar, Liar.

== Biography ==
Yukina Shuto, a native of Ōita Prefecture, was born on 19 December and educated at Pro-Fit Voice Actor Training School. In 2014, while studying as a third-year high school student, she was one of the nineteen domestic winners of the voice acting category at the 3rd Seiyū Damashī contest.

In October 2017, she was cast as Haru Urara in the Umamusume: Pretty Derby franchise. She reprised her role in the franchise's anime adaptation and video game. She was also part of the Yukina Shutō Birthday Special (首藤志奈生誕特別, Shutō Yukina Seitan Tokubetsu), which took place at Kochi Racecourse on 19 December 2021.

In December 2019, she was cast as Shizuku Hyōdō in the Idoly Pride multimedia project. She reprised her role in the project's 2021 anime and mobile game. In November 2020, she was cast as Orphia in Seirei Gensouki: Spirit Chronicles. In March 2021, she was cast as Mahiru Mizuhara in World's End Harem. In 2022, Shuto was one of thirty-four voice actors who moved from Pro Fit to Raccoon Dog, Nobuhiko Okamoto's talent agency. In November 2022, she was cast as Shirayuki Himeji in Liar, Liar.

In anime, she has had minor roles in Idolish7: Second Beat!, number24, Aikatsu Planet!, and Tokyo Revengers. In video games, she has voiced Bluegill in Azur Lane, Himena Aika in Magia Record, iDoll Sun in Goddess of Victory: Nikke, and Panette in Fire Emblem Engage.

She is a member of the seiyū unit Prima Porta.

She is a skilled violinist and is a calligraphy tokudaisei.

== Filmography ==
=== Anime television ===
2018

- Märchen Mädchen, Hildegard
- Umamusume: Pretty Derby, Haru Urara

2019

- Tenka Hyakken: Meiji-kan e Yōkoso!, Midare Tōshirō

2020

- Arad: Gyakuten no Wa, Kate
- Idolish7: Second Beat!, Iori fan B
- number24, Yasunari's older sister/second daughter

2021

- Aikatsu Planet!, spectator
- Idoly Pride, Shizuku Hyōdō
- Seirei Gensouki: Spirit Chronicles, Orphia
- Tokyo Revengers, girl B
- World's End Harem, Mahiru Mizuhara

2022

- Classroom of the Elite, Rika Morofuji

2023

- Liar, Liar, Shirayuki Himeji

2024

- Wonderful Pretty Cure!, Kirarin Bear, Karasuma
- Jellyfish Can't Swim in the Night, Momoko Yanagi
- The Unwanted Undead Adventurer, Alize
- Demon Slayer: Kimetsu no Yaiba, Sayo

2025

- A Wild Last Boss Appeared!, Aries

2026

- The Strongest Job Is Apparently Not a Hero or a Sage, but an Appraiser (Provisional)!, Vene
- Full Clearing Another World Under a Goddess with Zero Believers, Lucy

=== Video games ===
2017

- Kantai Collection, Etorofu, Matsuwa, Taiyo
- Reversal Othellonia, Niko

2018

- Tenka Hyakken: Zan, Midare Tōshirō

2020

- Azur Lane, Bluegill
- Magia Record, Himena Aika

2021

- Idoly Pride, Shizuku Hyōdō
- Touhou Danmaku Kagura, Shinmyoumaru Sukuna
- Umamusume: Pretty Derby, Haru Urara

2022

- Alice Fiction, Glass
- Goddess of Victory: Nikke, iDoll Sun
- Shadowverse, Lantern Fairy, Violence Soldier, Kenshin no Suiryū

2023

- Fire Emblem Engage, Panette
- Untitled Magical Girl, Konomi Minamino

2026

- Bunny Garden 2, Erisa
- Nekopara: Sekai Connect, Mugi

=== Others ===
2024

- Project:;Cold, Runa Yoshinaga
