= Dai Muneishi =

Japanese jockey and trainer (born 1951)

Dai Muneishi (Japanese: 宗石 大; born January 1, 1951) is a Japanese jockey and trainer at the Kochi Racecourse. He was known as trainer of the thoroughbred Haru Urara.

His first race was with Burringbar at Kochi. He achieved his first win with Gambare Shacho. His overall record according to Sky Racing World website: 61 wins, 273 places, among 3,495 total starts, not getting a single grade during his career.

== Early life ==
He was born on January 1, 1951, in the Tosayamada town at Kami District, Kōchi Prefecture (now Kami city) to a farming family that kept the farmhouses and racehorses. Muneishi tried to become a comedian, inspired by Entatsu Yokoyama. He gave up because of his lack of connections. He instead attended a vocational school to become a carpenter. However, he abandoned that effort due to financial problems. He then decided to become a jockey to take advantage of his small stature.

== Career ==
=== Jockey ===
As a jockey, he passed the "one-shot test" and later obtained a jockey license. While working part-time as jockey, he rode more than 10,000 times, achieving 1,000 victories. Muneishi said, "The fact that they gave me 10,000 rides despite being such a poor rider was a sign of obligation and kindness, so I too have become a person who values obligation and kindness."

=== Trainer ===
After retiring as a jockey, he became a trainer and made his first race in 1994. He is known as Haru Urara's trainer. In 2007, he broke the record for the most races with Hikaru Southern Cross. In 2012, he again broke the record for most races with Senor Best that is set by the National Association of Racing.
