= Kochi Racecourse =

Racecourse in Kochi, Japan

Kochi Racecourse 高知競馬場
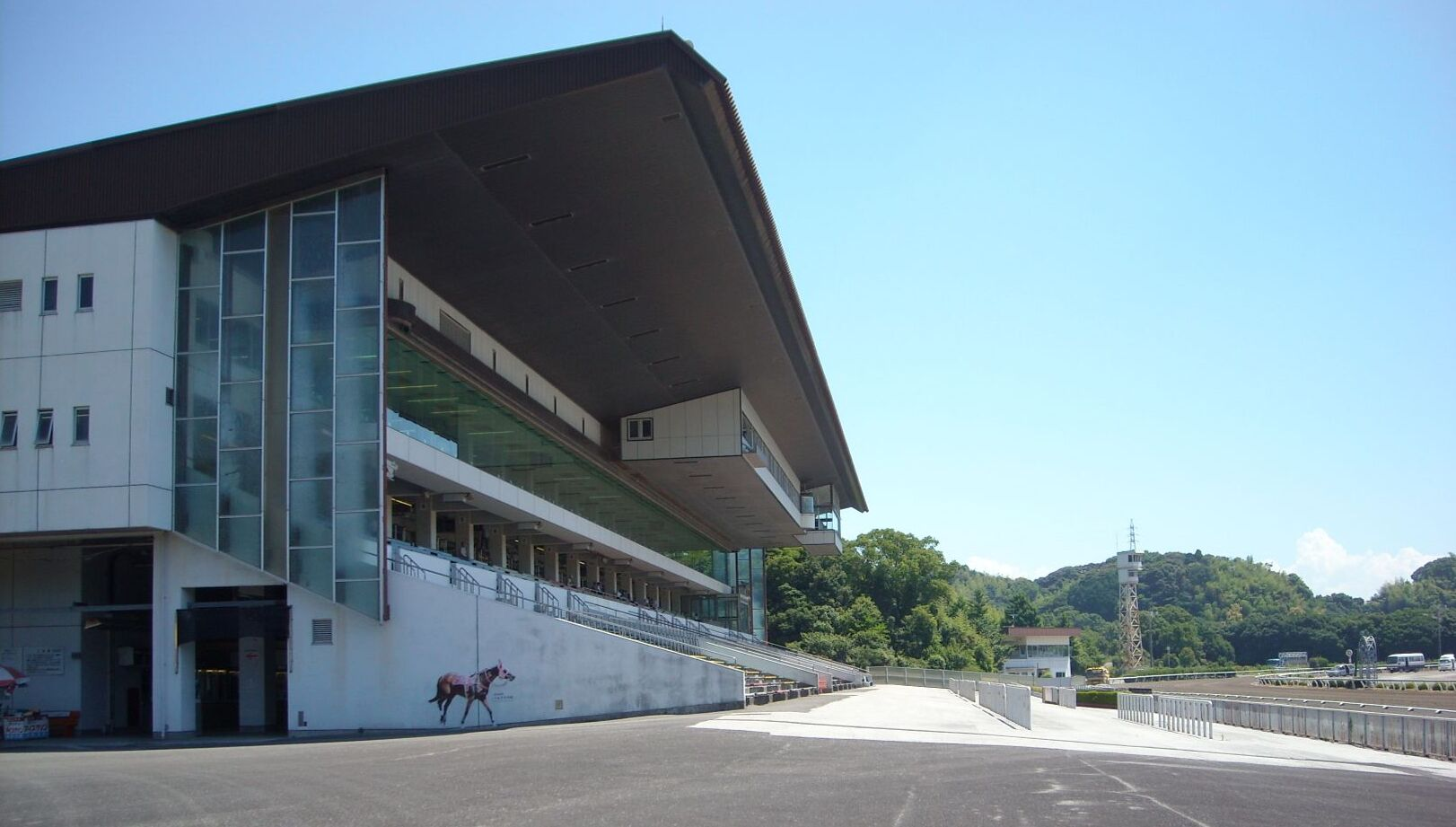
- Interactive map of Kochi Racecourse 高知競馬場
- Location: 2000 Nagahama-Miyata, Kochi-shi, Kochi 781-0271 Japan
- Coordinates: 33.5032°N 133.5306°E
- Owned by: Kochi Horse Racing Association
- Date opened: 1985
- Race type: Flat
- Course type: Dirt
- Notable races: Takeyoriwake Sho; Kurofune Show (Jpn-III)

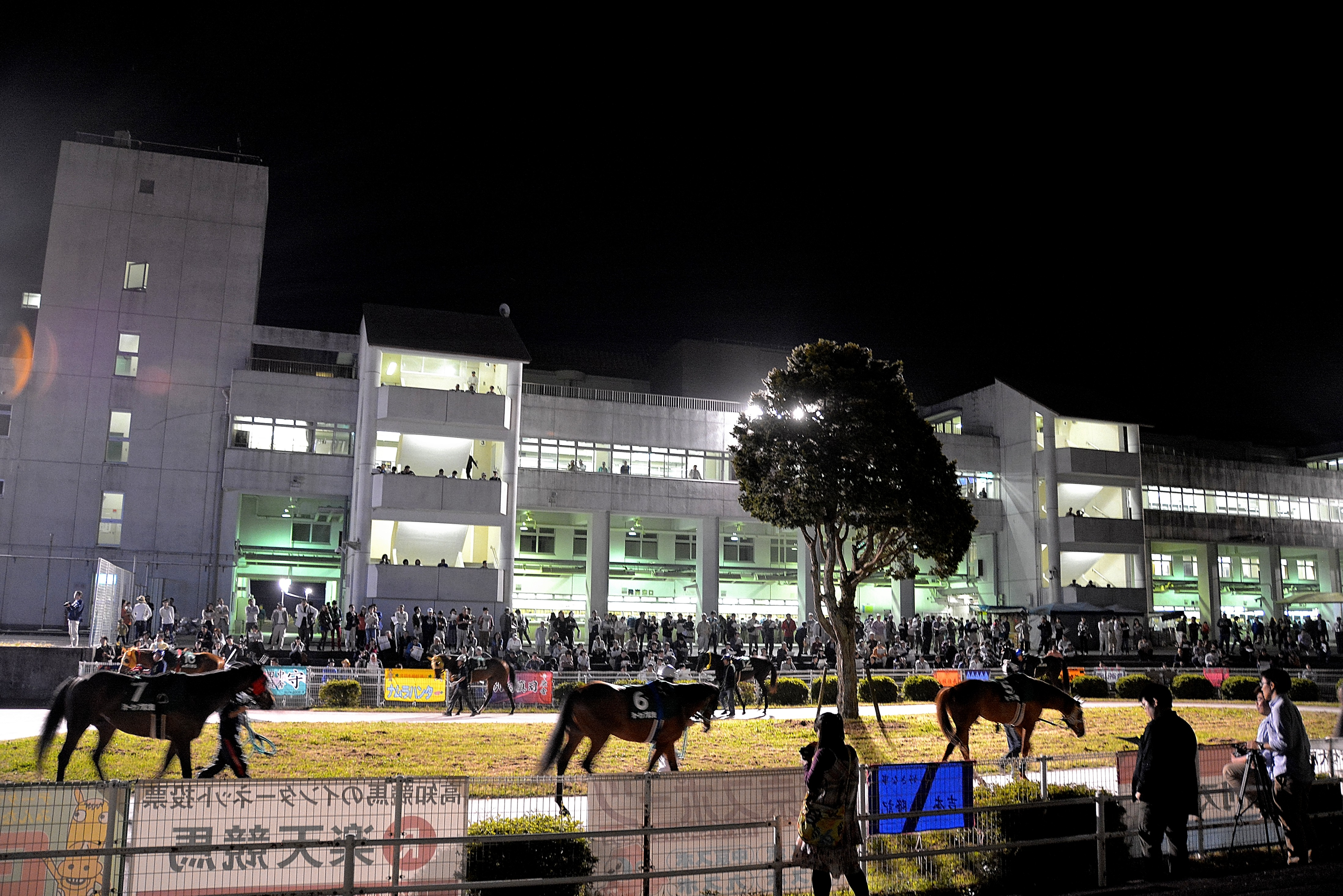
Paddock

Kochi Racecourse (高知競馬場, Kochi Keiba-jō) is located in Kōchi, Kōchi, Kōchi Prefecture, Japan. It is the only racecourse located in Shikoku.

== Physical attributes ==
Kochi Racecourse has a dirt course that runs in a right-handed (clockwise) direction, measuring 1,100 meters.

== Notable races ==
Month	Race	Distance	Age/Sex
JPN III
March	Kurofune Sho	Dirt 1400m	4yo +
Other Races
August	Takeyoriwake Sho	Dirt 1400m	3yo +
