= List of Hanebado! volumes =

Hanebado! is written and illustrated by Kōsuke Hamada. The series follows Ayano Hanesaki recovering from a disappointing badminton match in middle school. While her mother, Uchika Hanesaki left Ayano to their grandparents. Which one day she will play badminton again and have a chance to see Uchika again. The manga was published in Kodansha's seinen manga magazine good! Afternoon from June 7, 2013, to October 7, 2019, and released in sixteen tankōbon volumes.

== Volume list ==
Note: Each individual chapter of the series are called Rally. For example, the first chapter is "1st Rally".

No.	Release date	ISBN
1	October 13, 2013	978-4-06-387927-8
1. Osananajimi no Hanesaki Ayano Desu (幼馴染みの羽咲綾乃です少年の誓い); 2. Ga-Gaikokujin da (が…外国人だ――…！); 3. Hitori Ja nai n da kara (1人じゃないんだから); 4. Amasu Koto Naku (あます事なく)
At Kitakomachi High School, Kentaro Tachibana, the badminton club's coach met with the rest of the club and asked, if anyone joined. But Riko Izumi told Kentaro that they all left, for various reasons. Kentaro walks out of the gym and witness Ayano Hanesaki running up a tree to grab a handkerchief that was resting there. He asked her to join the badminton club. Later the badminton club arrives at a training camp, which the members of the Fredericia Girls High School were practicing at. Kentaro asks Ayano to play in a match, but she runs away. Ayano is relaxing by a river and was greeted by a girl. They walked around and got to a flower shop. The girl overheard Ayano's name when her phone rang. The rest of her badminton club arrived to take Ayano back to the gym. A match starts between Ayano and Riko facing Connie Christensen (who Ayano was with at the flower shop) and Hina Tagajo. Who calls Ayano her "older sister." As the practice match drags on. Connie and Hina are exhausted from returning the serves and quit the match. Connie felt depressed and Yuika Shiwahime, the Fredericia Girls badminton captain talked to her.
2	February 7, 2014	978-4-06-387955-1
5. Watashi ni Aini Kite (私に会いにきて); 6. Kitakomachi no Eesu (北小町のS1); 7. Fuchō no Genin (不調の原因); 8. Da kara Issho ni Ikō (だから一緒に行こう); 9. Uchi no Buin nan da kara (ウチの部員なんだから)
As the training camp ended, Connie speaks to Ayano more about her mother, Uchika Hanesaki. The next time they meet again. The next day at practice, Kentaro asks where Ayano is. Nagisa Aragaki, the badminton captain and Riko went with Kentaro to find her around school. Then finally to her house, and found out she was raised into a badminton family. Riko tells Ayano to go to the classroom. While Kentaro speaks to the club about a strategy for an upcoming tournament, and pairs up Ayano and Nagisa in a team. But working as a team seems hard. Kentaro switches out Nagisa for Riko and Ayano was able to read Riko's body movements to serve it back. Which Nagisa was lacking on and left practice. At night she came back and Kentaro wanted to have a match with her. When Miyako Tarōmaru, the team's advisor told them to go home. Ayano wanted a match with Nagisa, but after a serve. She scolds her and Ayano runs away. Nagisa chases after Ayano until she jumps into the river and Nagisa pulls her out.
3	July 7, 2014	978-4-06-387983-4
10. Sonna Mono Imasen wa (そんなものいませんわ); 11. Kaoruko Serigaya (去り際 香る子, Sarigiwa Kaoruko); 12. Makechatta Kara (負けちゃったから); 13. Hitori ja nai na (一人じゃないな); 14. Natsu no Taikai ga Hajimaru (夏の大会が始まる); 15. Zuru Gashikoku Yaranakya (ズル賢くやらなきゃ); 16. Shudō-ken o Watashi ni (主導権を私に)
Riko, Ayano, and Elena Fujisawa, Ayano's best friend went to visit Nagisa, who has a cold at home. While Ayano doesn't want to visit Nagisa, because it reminded her of someone. After visiting Nagisa, the gang stops by a beach and saw a girl shouting at the ocean. The next day Riko asks Ayano who was that girl, Kaoruko Serigaya, an old middle school badminton rival. Who got Ayano sick with a cold. Kaoruko unsuspectingly shows up at Kitakomachi to challenge Ayano and easily wins against her. Ayano runs away again and Kentaro finds her. She tells a story that her mother left Ayano behind with her grandparents. Because she lost to Kaoruko in middle school and had a cold. The upcoming badminton tournament begins as Ayano, Riko, and Nagisa won their matches. Until Kaoruko is facing against Ayano and gives a handkerchief to her, which Ayano accepts it. The match starts with Ayano using an intimidating look in her eyes to win a one sided match against Kaoruko.
4	November 7, 2014	978-4-06-388008-3
17. Mini Tsukete Shimatta (身に付けてしまった); 18. Fusawashī Basho (ふさわしい場所); 19. Aenai (会えない); 20. Natsu ga Chikazuku (夏が近づく); Extra Nippon ni kita yo (日本に来たよ)
Ayano won the match against Kaoruko by her serving back and not going over the net. She runs outside of the gym as Miki Sasashita tried to talk to Kaoruko. Ayano is taken away in a car by Viggo Kierkegaard to a badminton venue. Because she can see her mother again. Before Nagisa stopped her from leaving, while Kentaro asks what's going on? As they gotten to the new venue, Ayano is facing against an opponent named Luo Xiaoli. Riko lost her match to Nozomi Ishizawa. Kentaro and Nagisa left the tournament to find Ayano and bring her back. But Viggo suggested to wait until the match with Ayano and Luo is finished. Which Ayano won against Luo, but her real name is Wang Lixiao, the number one ranked badminton player. Ayano wanted to finish the current badminton tournament first. Then decide on Viggo's offer, about training better and reaching the Olympics. The "extra chapter" tells about Connie Christensen arriving in Japan from Denmark and meeting her teammates, the members of the Fredericia badminton club.
5	April 7, 2015	978-4-06-387983-4
21. Watashi ga Chousensha Dayo (私が挑戦者だよ); 22. Ichinen Buri (一年ぶり); 23. Atashi Nara (アタシなら); 24. Ima Iku (いま行く); 25. Anta no Mayoi da (アンタの迷いだ)
Nagisa is preparing before the semifinal match with Nozomi from Zushi Sogo High School. At school, a man was asking for directions. When some sport news reporters assisted him. Nagisa goes on a short jog and meets Riko and her siblings. The man was working in a garden and is Shintaro Hanesaki, Ayano's father. As Uchika was nearby and surprised by Shintaro saying her name. While Ayano left the tournament. The news about her winning a mock match with Wang Lixiao, surprised everyone in the badminton club, especially Nagisa. The semifinal match has begun with Nagisa facing against Nozomi. Nozomi's coach has a strategy for her to follow, which throws off Nagisa's strategy. To the point where Nozomi is getting yelled at, when the interval began. After a long match Nozomi lost and her coach felt he was too strict on her. Then the final match of the tournament is Ayano and Nagisa.
6	September 7, 2015	978-4-06-388008-3
26. Imasara (今更); 27. Aru Asobi (ある遊び); 28. Tanoshī! (楽しい！); 29. Auto Nan da (アウトなんだ); 30. Ato Itten (あと1点)
The final match of the tournament begins, as Ayano and Nagisa are evenly matched in the first round, in Ayano's favor. Akemi Matsukawa, a sports journalist. Remembers about Uchika manage to win many badminton tournaments, married Shintaro, having a child, and Ayano becoming a prodigy. While growing up, Ayano was trained by Uchika. But she had an injury by running into the side of the net pole. A fear Uchika didn't want to risk. The second round starts and is evenly matched.
7	February 5, 2016	978-4-06-388116-5
31. Fainaru Gēmu (ファイナルゲーム); 32. Shiroobi no Mukō ni Mieru (白帯の向こうに見える); 33. Kitto Doko kade (きっとどこかで); 34. Ima Kara Hajimeru (今から始める); 35. Daremo Shiranai (誰も知らない)
The second round is won by Nagisa. Kentaro tells Ayano to calm down. The third round begins and Ayano thinks she can win, but for the last match point. She throws her racket to the ground and unable to return the serve. The last round is won by Nagisa and the tournament. Ayano is exhausted from the match and woke up resting from a bench. When Shintaro greeted her and she ran to Nagisa to ask for a match again. At the hospital Nagisa has Patellar tendinitis and has withdrawn from the club to recover. Since the badminton tournament ended and Elena wants to substitute in for her. For the next upcoming badminton tournament. Elena wins over her first opponent, but her second opponent, Emi Hashizume from Yokohama Shouei High School won against her.
8	August 5, 2016	978-4-06-388165-3
36. Kōken (貢献); 37. Watashi ga Mamoru Kara (私が守るから); 38. Nasubeki Koto (為すべき事); 39. Zutto Watashi no... (ずっと私の…); 40. C Tokutai (C特待)
Emi's badminton coach greeted Nozomi's coach. As Nozomi speaks to her coach, he got nervous. Nozomi leaves the gym to find Nagisa resting by a bench and asked about her injury. Then asks about how similar strategies Ayano and Emi uses. The next match is in pairs, Ayano and Riko is facing against Emi and Mizuki Shigemori. Emi and Mizuki comes up with an idea to extend the serve. To exhaust Ayano and Riko's energy. The next interval began, Ayano and Riko finds a new strategy against them. They won, as the next match is starting. Ayano is against Mizuki and easily wins. While Riko is against Emi.
9	December 7, 2016	978-4-06-388221-6
41. Makeruna (負けるな); 42. Kiseki Datte (奇跡だって); 43. Shūgō (集合); 44. Kosei (個性); 45. Tokkun (特訓)
The match started and the interval shortly begins. As Emi thinks she is on the same playing level as Nagisa. But Riko heard about it and soon wins against her. At the end of the day everyone goes home. Nozomi's coach greets Kentaro and chats with him. Mizuki and Emi speaks to each other about losing the tournament. Nagisa and Riko got lost going back home, by getting off at the wrong train stop. When Miyako seen them and brought them near their home. Ayano got a call from Connie to go see Uchika, but she declines. Uchika speaks to the Fredericia Girls, that she will be their coach. Then she asked Connie, are you continuing the sport after graduating high school? Or doing something else. At the semifinals of the tournament Kitakomachi lost to Konan, while in the finals Konan lost to Zushi Sogo. Later, Nagisa and Riko retires from playing badminton and will assist the club. Kaoruko visits Ayano at her house to have a match at the gym. As they begin, Ayano wavers about how Uchika left and hasn't been around for two years. Kaoruko tells her to stop over thinking it, as the match is interrupted and Ayano began to sleep. She started to dream about her and Uchika playing badminton together, back when she was younger. Ayano woke up, as Kaoruko was surprised by her remark about Ayano's changed personally. Later Ayano went to Viggo unannounced and asks him to train her. Ayano and Viggo went to Kitakomachi to talk to Ayano's badminton club. Uchika wants to train with Connie, but she declines and ran away thinking about living together with her and Ayano.
10	May 1, 2017	978-4-06-388254-4
46. San kyō (三強); 47. Rui Mashiko (益子泪, Mashiko Rui); 48. Haru no Ōja (春の王者); 49. Tanoshimu Tame no Junbi (楽しむ為の準備); 50. Hajime no Ichi (はじめの1)
The next badminton tournament is in Okayama. Which Nagisa and Ayano won the qualifier to the tournament. They practice after taking exams until the tournament began. On the train ride to Okayama, the club gave their farewells to Nagisa. Kentaro reads through the newspaper about the tournament. It doesn't lists about Nagisa and Ayano's name on it, Kentaro thinks it's because of Akemi. Upon arriving at Okayama, everybody is there. But Ayano shows up late. Akemi saw Uchika and was surprised by her. Akemi asks about Ayano and Connie. Uchika replies that she didn't raise them in her own way. Wanting to be independent from her and left. The second round of the tournament begins with Zushi Sogo and the Fredericia Girls. Viggo is training Ayano and she was surprised by a girl. Who told her name was "Ayano Shindo" during the junior badminton tournament a few years ago. But Ayano repeatedly denied that name. The girl introduces herself as Rui Mashiko from Utsunomiya Academy. Zushi Sogo lost to Fredericia Girls and Mashiko team won in pairs against Konan. Ayano and Nagisa began their matches and won. Rui was watching Ayano's second match and frustrated that the match felt boring, wanted to fight Kairi Asahi, her teammate. She told Rui to calm down. The match ended in a close win in Ayano's favor. Elena saw Uchika and told her to watch Ayano's next match. She is against Akane Oinomori and in a test of stamina, Akane wants to win against Ayano to get to Yuika first.
11	October 6, 2017	978-4-06-388291-9
51. Sentakushi (選択肢); 52. Sakusen (作戦); 53. Furui Tokei (古い時計); 54. Sui Mashiko (益子推, Mashiko Sui); 55. Tsumiageta Hibi (積み上げた日々)
Ayano has won against Akane and is facing against Rui. The match begins and Rui quickly scores, surprising Ayano and she predicts her next move. At the start of the interval, Viggo has a strategy for Ayano to not show her weakness and leaving hints for Rui to win. He told Ayano to use the strategy that she used against Nagisa, but she looks at Ayano to not use it. Rui taunts Ayano and she used Viggo's strategy and Rui returns the serve for a match point. It throws Ayano off and Rui won the first round. At the start of the second round, Viggo gave some advice to Ayano. In a flashback, Rui is with her family. Who won against her opponents in a badminton tournament. Her parents treated her less than her brother, Sui Mashiko, who praised him to go to a prestigious college. Ayano started too able to score against Rui and it catches her off guard. But Rui recalls about, how many sports journalists see her getting better at badminton, until she won against Sui and he lost a scholarship to the college. Because the badminton coach witnessed them facing each other and had high praise for him, but he picked Rui instead. Rui gained momentum and scored more points against Ayano. Until Ayano played defensively and it drained some of her stamina. She thought of a new strategy and was able to score a point.
12	March 7, 2018	978-4-06-511097-3
56. Kachimake (勝ち負け); 57. Chigau Me (違う目); 58. Jishin no Konkyo (自信の根拠); 59. Sekai Reberu (世界レベル); 60. Suki Dakara (好きだから)
The match continued with Ayano and Rui, as Ayano is able to score more points. Meanwhile Nagisa is facing against Connie and she heard about Nagisa's knees and wanted her to quit the tournament, but declines. The second round is won by Ayano, while as everyone is doing their best with their matches. The third round has started and Rui can't figure out Ayano's newly passion for winning. While everyone has finished with their matches. They watched Ayano's match with Rui. In a flashback, Asahi remembers about how great Rui is in badminton. Ayano and Rui continue to serve to each other. Until Rui's serve didn't cross the net, and Ayano won. Later at night, the rest of Rui's teammates from Utsunomiya Academy was surprised that she lost. Asahi saw Rui with a boy, thinking it was her boyfriend and left to her hotel room. Until she saw Rui and said to her, was that your boyfriend. But Rui said, it was Sui, her brother. Nagisa is still against Connie and everyone is surprised that they're talented. As Elena asked about, how the match was going on between Nagisa and Connie was. Yu and the others wondered about Ayano's match. Elena said that she won, but she is tired out and sleeping. Viggo suggested to Uchika to be a better parent and help carry Ayano back to the hotel. While Miyako, who was nearby, told what was on her mind about them. The match continued with Nagisa and Connie each won a single round. The third round started and Connie surprised Nagisa by starting to win a one sided match. Which she reminded Nagisa about her knees again.
13	July 6, 2018	978-4-06-511877-1
61. Iki Dekinai (息できない); 62. Genkai o Koeta Chikara (限界を超えた力); 63. Besuto 4 (ベスト4); 64. Nokosareta Jikan (残された時間)
As Connie and Nagisa are trying to win the third round, Nagisa is close to winning. Until, Kentaro pulls her out of the match. After Nagisa swung a powerful serve and he noticed her knees. Nagisa told Kentaro that she can still continue, but he worries about her. Connie left to use the shower and Connie's teammates followed her there. Wondering why is she laying there with her sportswear on. Kentaro tells Nagisa about if her knee hurts and it doesn't. The remaining people left in the tournament. Now consists of Ayano, Connie, Yuika, and Tsubata Michi. Later at night, Ayano saw Rui and had a short conversation. Meanwhile, Tsubata wanted to face against Rui and left. Ayano gone back to the hotel to see Viggo and Shintaro, she overhearing them talking about Uchika. She hid and heard about Uchika being sick with something. The next day, the tournament continued in pairs with Kairi and Rui, as Nagisa tries to find Ayano. While Connie found Ayano being alone by herself.
14	November 22, 2018	978-4-06-513446-7
65. Yoyū Shika Nai (余裕しかない); 66. Seotteru Mono (背負ってるもの); 67. Kōi (好意); 68. Moshimo (もしも); 69. Itsutsume no Kurosu Faia (5つ目のクロスファイア)
Kairi and Rui won the match and for the final match of the double finals is against the Fredericia Girls. The next match is the semifinal with Ayano facing against Yuika. Yuika catches her off-guard until the start of the interval. Nagisa went to talk to Ayano about her not returning Yuika's serves. The match continued, which in one point Yuika smiled at her and Ayano thought she did. Yuika thought to herself that by replying to Ayano, she can use the conversation. By stalling the match to her advantage. With the first round ending in Yuika's favor, Ayano surprises her with a sudden serve. She then throws her racket up in the air, as the referee told her to not do anything drastic. The second round began and in a flashback, Yuika remembers her time at Fredericia Girls before going to her first year in high school. Ayano won the second round as the last round begins. Meanwhile, Connie is facing against Michi. At the end of the interval, Yuika saw a weakness in Ayano's strategy, by looking at her elbow.
15	June 7, 2019	978-4-06-515719-0; ISBN 978-4-06-515720-6 (SP)
70. Jidai o kaeru (時代を変える); 71. Mune o hatte (胸を張って); 72. Bright Hikari yo!!! (Bright(光よ)!!!); 73. Kakugo (覚悟); 74. Saikō no Shiai o (最高の試合を)
At the end of the third round's interval. Ayano and Yuika fought a long match in Ayano's favor. Everyone saw the tournament standings knowing about Ayano winning against Yuika as the next semifinal match began with Connie and Tsubata. Tsubata thinking that she'll easily win against Connie, she surprised Tsubata and started to win a one sided match. Which scared Uchika and thought she raised a monster. Elena asked Ayano about her match, but she wanted to talk to Uchika. Who wanted to leave the tournament, Ayano confronted Uchika and asked if she was sick. Uchika started to cough as Ayano yelled at her for trying to leave vague answers. Ayano asks Elena about what just happened and stay with her. Meanwhile, Connie won against Tsubata. Later, the final match of the tournament in badminton pairs is Kairi and Rui are facing against Misato and Shiraishi from the Fredericia Girls. Nagisa and Riko talked to each other about her time in the tournament. Kairi and Rui easily won against the Fredericia Girls. Kaoruko was walking by and saw Elena, which she commented about Ayano's wellbeing and personally. Meanwhile, Uchika saw Connie and she woke up and wanted to talk to her about Ayano. The final match begins with Ayano facing against Connie, but someone else appeared in front of Ayano, which surprises her. The girl was Connie, but she cut her hair by Yuika assisting to cut it. The final match begins, but Connie remarks that it will be different during that time, when they first met.
16	November 7, 2019	978-4-06-517483-8
75. Soreijō no Tatakai (それ以上の戦い); 76. Tensai (天才); 77. Owara setakunai (終わらせたくない); 78. Nihonichi no Kōkōsei (日本一の高校生); Final. ikuyo!!! (行くよ!!!)
In the final match of the tournament with Ayano and Connie. They both had a strategy to serve and wear out their stamina. As Ayano had an idea to serve back, but Connie saw through it. Commenting that she and Ayano were raised as prodigies under Uchika's care. They each served and won a round, exhausting their stamina. For the third final round, Ayano won 30-28. Everyone from Kitakomachi congratulated Ayano for the win and Connie was crying on Yuika's shoulder. At the end of the tournament, Ayano and Connie got their medals. Later, everyone from the tournament went their separate ways to drink, eat, and told what their future plans was. Meanwhile, Ayano and the rest of them gone back home from Okayama. Two years later, Nozomi was asked by her former high school coach to help around. As they got to the gym, Nagisa and Anri Toyohashi are training a team of high school students in badminton. After helping them out, Connie is facing against Wang at a tournament and was evenly matched with her. While Kentaro is coaching for the national team. They were talking about how skillful Wang is. Later, Connie went to see Uchika's gravestone as Ayano was there too. She wanted to know what Ayano is doing after high school. Ayano replied to her that she wants to take things slow and go from there. Afterwards, they went to an exhibition match with Ayano facing against Kaoruko.
