= Uta Isaki =

Japanese manga artist

Uta Isaki 伊咲ウタ
- Born: February 14 Shizuoka Prefecture, Japan
- Area: Manga artist
- Notable works: Generation Witch; Is Love the Answer?; The Spellbook Library

Uta Isaki (Japanese: 伊咲ウタ, Hepburn: Isaki Uta) is a Japanese manga artist and illustrator. They debuted in 2008 and began their first series, Sayabito: Swords of Destiny, in Good! Afternoon in 2009, where it was serialized until 2013. They later created Generation Witch, which was serialized in Monthly Comic Rex from 2013 to 2016, and Is Love the Answer?, which was serialized in Hatsu Kiss from 2020 to 2021.

== Biography ==
Isaki was born in Shizuoka Prefecture on February 14. They became interested in becoming a manga artist in kindergarten, when they read Swan. They later attended and graduated from Osaka University of Arts. In 2008, they won the grand prize at the Afternoon Shiki Shō.

On March 5, 2009, Isaki began serializing their first series, Sayabito: Swords of Destiny, in Kodansha's Good! Afternoon magazine. It completed its serialization on March 7, 2013. It has been published in English digitally by Kodansha USA. Their next series, Generation Witch, began serialization in Ichijinsha's magazine Monthly Comic Rex on December 27, 2013. Its serialization was completed on April 27, 2016. Seven Seas Entertainment is publishing the series in English.

In 2016, Isaki serialized Katsuji Chūgoku-sha no ma hon Tansaku, Aruiwa Ura Toshokon no Koto: Mahotan in Nakayoshi. Isaki began serializing their next series, Bukimi no Tani no Roboko-san, in Dengeki Daioh on August 26, 2017. It completed its serialization on February 27, 2019. They also published "Kamiyui" in Éclair: A Girls' Love Anthology That Resonates in Your Heart in 2016 and "Mishin" in its 2017 sequel Éclair Blanche.

Is Love the Answer?, Isaki's next series, began serialization in Kodansha's Hatsu Kiss magazine on August 25, 2020. Its serialization was completed on January 25, 2021. Kodansha USA published it in English. In October 2023, Irodori Comics crowdfunded an English release of Isaki Uta: The Lost and Found Collection, collecting "Mermaid in the Bottle", "Leapers", "Mine-kun Is Asexual", and "Silkscreen", four doujinshi (self-published) works by Isaki. At Anime NYC 2023, Kodansha USA announced that Isaki's next series, The Spellbook Library, would be published in English first on their website.

== Style ==
Isaki is often noted for their works related to LGBTQ topics and gender expression, though they also have many works with other themes.

== Influences ==
Isaki has cited the works of Yuri Narushima as an influence on their work, particularly in how to depict characters.

== Works ==
=== Series ===
Title	Year	Magazine	Notes	Ref.
Sayabito: Swords of Destiny	2009–2013	Good! Afternoon		
Generation Witch	2013–2016	Monthly Comic Rex		
Katsuji Chūgoku-sha no ma hon Tansaku, Aruiwa Ura Toshokon no Koto: Mahotan	2016	Nakayoshi		
Bukimi no Tani no Roboko-san	2017–2019	Dengeki Daioh		
Is Love the Answer?	2020–2021	Hatsu Kiss		
The Spellbook Library	2023–2026	—N/a		

=== Short works ===
Title	Year	Notes	Ref.
"Kamiyui"	2016	Included in the anthology Éclair: A Girls' Love Anthology That Resonates in Your Heart	
"Mishin"	2017	Included in the anthology Éclair Blanche	
"Leapers"	2018	Included in the anthology Isaki Uta: The Lost and Found Collection	
"Mermaid in the Bottle"	2019	Included in the anthology Isaki Uta: The Lost and Found Collection	
"Mine-kun Is Asexual"	2019	Included in the anthology Isaki Uta: The Lost and Found Collection	
"Kimi wa Tokubetsu Nako"	2020	Published in Comic Polaris	
"Silkscreen"	2020	Included in the anthology Isaki Uta: The Lost and Found Collection	
