= The Spellbook Library =

Japanese manga series

- Cover of the first volume, featuring Tohru
- Genre: Adventure; Fantasy
- Manga
- Written by: Uta Isaki
- Published by: Kodansha
- English publisher: NA: Kodansha USA
- Magazine: Kodansha Reader Portal
- Original run: November 18, 2023 – January 06, 2026
- Volumes: 4

The Spellbook Library is a Japanese manga series written and illustrated by Uta Isaki. Published in English first, the series began serialization on Kodansha USA's platform Kodansha Reader Portal on November 18, 2023. As of January 2026, the series is complete and individual chapters have been collected into four volumes.

== Plot ==
Yan grew up a troublemaker. However, when he was attacked by a spellbeast, his life was saved by spellbook librarians. Following these events, Yan decides to become spellbook librarian himself. On the day of the employment exam, he meets Tohru, a mysterious boy who also wants become a librarian for personal reasons. Together, they pass the test and must then learn how to become better spellbook librarians.

== Production ==
When Isaki first began working as a manga artist, they mostly wrote seinen and shōjo manga. However, they had wanted to try writing a more traditional shōnen manga and began planning a story for one. Eventually, an editor reached out to them to create a title for the Kodansha Reader Portal platform, so Isaki decided to base it on their planned story.^{Vol. 1}

== Publication ==
Written and illustrated by Uta Isaki, the series was announced by Kodansha USA at Anime NYC 2023 as an English-first release. It began serialization on their Kodansha Reader Portal platform on November 18, 2023. As of January 2026, the series is complete and individual chapters have been collected into four volumes.

=== Volumes ===
No.	English release date	English ISBN
1	October 22, 2024	979-8-88-877293-5
2	December 31, 2024	979-8-88-877294-2
3	September 30, 2025	979-8-88-8775455
4	January 6, 2026	979-8-88-8775455

== Reception ==
The story has received a positive response from critics. Rebecca Silverman of Anime News Network wrote that it feels like a shōnen version of Magus of the Library. Jean-Karlo Lemus of the same website felt that the story was a little shallow, though they liked action scenes. Kara Denison of Otaku USA liked the mix of action, comedy, and fantasy elements, comparing it to Cardcaptor Sakura. The characters have also received some praise. Lemus liked the main trio and their interactions. Silverman felt that Yan was "not all that interesting", but that she was "invested" in Tohru and curious to learn more about him. Lemus also praised the setting, which he described as "Arabian Nights-esque".

The artwork has seen a positive response. Silverman felt that it was "clean and easy to follow"; she also felt the backgrounds were very detailed and "breathtaking". Denison described both the artwork and the character designs as "gorgeous".
