= Teppu =

Japanese manga series

- First tankōbon volume cover, featuring Natsuo Ishido

鉄風
- Genre: Sports
- Manga
- Written by: Moare Ohta
- Published by: Kodansha
- English publisher: NA: Kodansha USA
- Magazine: Good! Afternoon
- Original run: November 7, 2008 – July 7, 2015
- Volumes: 8
- icon

Teppu (Japanese: 鉄風; lit. 'Iron Wind') is a Japanese mixed martial arts-themed manga series written and illustrated by Moare Ohta. It was serialized in Kodansha's seinen manga magazine Good! Afternoon from November 2008 to July 2015, with its chapters collected in eight tankōbon volumes.

== Plot ==
The series follows Natsuo Ishido, a freshman in high school. She has a natural talent for everything she does, and as a result becomes bored with doing anything. She is often praised (and occasionally hated) for her incredible talent, but in reality she feels lonely, so she is often looking for more and more things to occupy her time. As she fails to find anything that is sufficiently challenging, her loneliness and boredom reach a bottomed-out state.

One day, after a volleyball practice, she meets Yuzuko Mawatari advertising for the mixed martial arts (MMA) club, and although at the time she is uninterested, the idea stays with her for the rest of the day. She learns that Yuzuko and one other girl are the sole members of the club, and as such is not an official club yet, so she decides to investigate. She meets the two members and challenges Yuzuko to a spar, in which the two of them exchange glancing blows. When Sanae Sawamura, the captain of the karate team, shows up, Natsuo decides to leave. After she has left, she realizes her nose and lip are bleeding, and she resolves that she hates Yuzuko, and later returns to challenge her to another spar. She loses the spar, but gains a solid interest in MMA to the point where she quits the volleyball team.

From that point, the story follows her as she overcomes various challenges in order to become good enough to face Yuzuko again in a public match. This culminates in an 8-person qualifying tournament for a later tournament G-girl. Over the course of her second round fight with Sanae Sawamura, Natsuo's backstory is delved into and she faces up to the abuse dealt to her by her older brother. After a close but cathartic loss to Yuzuko in the finals, Natsuo is considered to be good enough to earn a spot as a stand in fighter at G-girl.

== Characters ==
Natsuo Ishido (石堂 夏央, Ishidō Natsuo)
Natsuo Ishido is a naturally talented at everything she does. Having lived with this ability her whole life, she cannot understand why other people cannot do things which she can do. This has given her a condescending attitude against her opponents, who she goads and teases during their match and after Natsuo's inevitable victory. She is also ruthless when fighting, whether or not the fight is a serious one (she once defeated Mai by swiftly kicking her in the stomach, knocking her to the ground and rendering her unable to move).
Natsuo has come to the realization that people with the ability to be the best without even trying have the hardest time, since they do not have anyone to bond with and their whole life is one big competition. She is lonely and yearns for someone who can defeat her and give her something to actually work for.
Yuzuko Mawatari (馬渡 ゆず子, Mawatari Yuzuko)
Yuzuko is Natsuo's main rival throughout the story. Born in Japan, she moved with her parents to Brazil. While there she became an exceptional MMA fighter under the training of Mario Cordeiro. She is the captain of the budding MMA club at the Natsuo's high school and is close friends with Mario Cordeiro daughter, Ringi. It is two early fights with Yuzuko that drive Natsuo to become an MMA fighter. Yuzuko has no talent, but makes up for this limitation with pure tenacity and a single-minded focus on moving forward. As a result, Yuzuko often comes off as "creepy" by others, who are disturbed by the level of enjoyment she derives from MMA.
Sanae Sawamura (沢村 早苗, Sawamura Sanae)
Sanae is the captain of the karate team. In the year previous to the events of the series, she went to the National Karate Competition and placed second, raising the near-defunct karate team into recognition. She has declared an unofficial war on the MMA club, and has convinced the other karate team members to do the same. She and Natsuo were childhood friends, but ever since Natsuo attacked her and left the karate team, she has acted cold toward Natsuo. This feeling accentuated after she learned that Natsuo picked a fight with the karate team and bullied Mai.
Ringi Cordeiro (リンジィ・コルデイロ, Rinji Korudeiro)
Ringi is the daughter of world-renowned MMA champion Mario Cordeiro. She has lived in Brazil for most of her life, but returned to Japan to visit Yuzuko, her childhood friend. She is an amazing fighter, even to the point that Yuzuko suggested that Natsuo would be a good match for her. When fighting, she maintains an air of naivete, blurting false weaknesses to get her opponent into an opportune position. She oversaw the sparring rematch between Natsuo and Yuzuko, immediately seeing Natsuo's natural talent in the sport. Ringi has then been eager to have her sparring match with Natsuo ever since.
Mario Cordeiro (マリオ・コルデイロ, Mario Korudeiro)
Mario is the father of Ringi Cordeiro. He is a legendary MMA champion who has never lost a match in over 500 fights. He considers Yuzuko to be his surrogate daughter.
Risuke Takenaka (竹中 理祐, Takenaka Risuke)
Takenaka is a former pro MMA fighter and owner of the gym that Natsuo and Karin practice at. At the beginning of the story he loses (possibly on purpose) a televised match to Ringi to generate interest in G-girl. His stated goal is to one day have a match with Mario Cordeiro. He has one daughter who unbeknownst to him practices MMA in the club Yuzuko started.
Meika Takenaka
Risuke's daughter, together her, Yuzuko, and Ringi make up the three members of the high school MMA club. She goes unnamed until the series' finale, having gone by the nickname "shrimp", in reference to her poor, or at least underdeveloped, physique and skills, as well as the simple Jiu Jitsu move that she frequently practices.
Mai Ganeko (我如古 舞, Ganeko Mai)
Mai is a member of the karate team. She is the only person in the school who knows Sanae's dark past, and she hates Natsuo with a passion. It is heavily implied that she has a crush on Sanae.
Kei Ninomiya (二ノ宮 ケイ, Ninomiya Kei)
Kei is Natsuo's friend from the volleyball team, and possibly Natsuo's only friend.
Karin Kontani (紺谷 可鈴, Kontani Karin)
Karin is Natsuo's trainer at the MMA gym, and a fighter herself. Her record is 22–1, and she is considered one of the strongest women in Japan. She takes an interest in Natsuo after watching her fight with Sanae. She wishes to fight and defeat Ringi Cordeiro.
Haruka Kirido (桐戸 ハルカ)
A trainee also learning MMA at Tanekada's gym under the tutelage of Karin. Also a freshman like Natsuo, Kirido was originally trained for Judo before shifting to MMA, and she and Natsuo first met in chapter 6 where they were formally introduced to each other by Karin, as well as the rest of the trainees. Physically, she is almost as tall as Natsuo (who stands 182cm), and stands at a height of 177cm (5'10), making her the only person in the gym to rival Natsuo as far as height is concerned. Somewhat fond of teasing people, she annoyed Natsuo when she referred to her as "Goliath", causing the latter to decide to make Kirido her first stepping stone. Halfway through the chapter, Kirido ends up paired with Natsuo in a practice sparring match, where she shows the latter a fair bit of grappling, making Natsuo realize that more physical contact is required in MMA than it was in Karate.

== Publication ==
Written and illustrated by Moare Ohta, Teppu made its debut in the first ever issue of Kodansha's seinen magazine Good! Afternoon on November 7, 2008, and finished on July 7, 2015. Kodansha collected its chapters in eight tankōbon volumes, released from March 5, 2010, to October 7, 2015.

At Anime Expo 2023, Kodansha USA announced that it had licensed the series for English digital publication starting on July 18 of the same year. In December 2024, Kodansha USA announced the Kodansha Print Club publishing program, focusing on releasing print versions of previously digital-only titles, including Teppu.

=== Volumes ===
No.	Original release date	Original ISBN	English release date	English ISBN
1	March 5, 2010	978-4-06-310637-4	July 18, 2023	979-8-88-933023-3
2	March 5, 2010	978-4-06-310638-1	August 15, 2023	979-8-88-933060-8
3	October 7, 2010	978-4-06-310698-5	September 19, 2023	979-8-88-933061-5
4	June 7, 2011	978-4-06-310755-5	November 28, 2023	979-8-88-933062-2
5	May 7, 2012	978-4-06-387821-9	January 23, 2024	979-8-88-933063-9
6	June 6, 2014	978-4-06-387974-2	March 19, 2024	979-8-88-933224-4
7	September 7, 2015	978-4-06-388084-7	May 28, 2024	979-8-88-933225-1
8	October 7, 2015	978-4-06-388091-5	July 23, 2024	979-8-88-933453-8
