= House of the Sun =

Japanese manga series

- Cover of the 1st volume

たいようのいえ (Taiyō no Ie)
- Genre: Romance, slice of life
- Manga
- Written by: Ta'amo
- Published by: Kodansha
- English publisher: Kodansha USA
- Magazine: Dessert
- Original run: May 2010 – January 2015
- Volumes: 13

House of the Sun (Japanese: たいようのいえ, Hepburn: Taiyō no Ie) is a Japanese manga series written and illustrated by Ta'amo. It was serialized by Kodansha in Dessert magazine. The series has completed with 13 volumes. The first volume was released on September 13, 2010 and the final volume was released on June 24, 2015. It won the 38th Kodansha Manga Award for Best Shōjo in 2014. The story revolves around the life and difficulties of Mao Motomiya and the Nakamuras. The series received a drama CD adaptation bundled with limited edition pressings of the fifth and sixth volumes. The manga has been licensed for an English digital release by Kodansha USA.

== Plot ==
A Tokyo resident, Mao liked to spend her time with the Nakamura family ever since she was a kid. Having troubled circumstances at home, she found happiness at the Nakamura household. However, the feelings of ease vanish when Mr. and Mrs. Nakamura died after a tragic incident. Mao, now a high school student, loses her sanctuary; her parents are divorced, and her father has decided to remarry. Hiro Nakamura, Mao's childhood friend, learns of her parents' abandonment of her and offers Mao to live with him. Mao decides to stay there until she can make up with her father and return to her original home. As they spend their days together, Hiro and Mao grow closer once again. They wait for Hiro's siblings, who had parted ways since their parents' death, to come back and live together. Mao's goal is to turn the home into "the house of magic, a place filled with both laughter and tears" once again.

== Characters ==
=== Main characters ===
Mao Motomiya (本宮 真魚, Motomiya Mao)
Voiced by: Aoi Yūki (Drama CD)
The main female character. A 17-year-old high school girl who is depicted as shy and gloomy but she has a big caring heart and fun side. During her childhood, her parents worked late so she often ended up playing at the Nakamuras'. She lives with her father who is remarried but she feels unloved at home so, after meeting up with Hiro after years of not seeing each other, she decides to start living with him. She writes a cellphone novel titled "Taiyou no Ie" under the pen name "Kuukai". To become independent, she works with Daiki in a samurai themed cafe. Like Ai, she likes historical drama and samurai. As the series progresses, she confesses her feelings for Hiro and reconciles with her father's new family. After moving back in with her father (Ch. 44), she unexpectedly meets her mother who wants to live with Mao again, but she turns her mother's offer down. At the end of the series, she and Hiro start dating. They later marry and have a daughter.
Hiro Nakamura (中村 基, Nakamura Hiro)
Voiced by: Yuichi Nakamura (Drama CD)
The main male character and Mao's childhood friend. A 24-year-old man who works at an office as a programmer and lives alone in the Nakamura household. In high school, his parents died and he started to live alone in the Nakamura household, whereas his siblings lived at their relatives' home (towards the end of the series, he convinces them to move in with him). He offers Mao a place to stay after knowing her family's circumstances. His dream is to live together with his siblings under the same roof. He is caring and protective, and often "acts like a mother" towards Mao and his siblings. He has romantic feelings for Mao but holds back because of their age difference. He is a fan of Mao's novel but does not know that it is written by her; he discovers the truth only in Ch. 48, thanks to Ai's help. At the end of the series, he confesses to Mao and they start dating; he also says he would like her to be a part of his family, as in his wife. They later get married and they have a daughter together.
Daiki Nakamura (中村 大樹, Nakamura Daiki)
Voiced by: Yoshimasa Hosoya (Drama CD)
Hiro's and Hina's brother, and Mao's childhood friend, who joins the main cast later in the series. After his parents died, he moved in with his uncle's family in Kobe. He's a 17-year-old serious, rude and smart boy who transfers to the same high school as Mao, after moving in with Hiro and Mao (Ch. 24). Since childhood, he has feelings for Mao but she sees him only as friend/family. He also works at the same samurai themed cafe as Mao. He likes video games but he's very bad at them.

=== Supporting characters ===
Chihiro (千尋) or Chī-chan (ちーちゃん)
Voiced by: Yōko Hikasa (Drama CD)
Mao's cheerful best friend and confidante. She has a crush on Oda, whom she ends up dating, although she's rejected at first.
Oda (織田)
Voiced by: Hiroyuki Yoshino (Drama CD)
Mao's classmate who has a crush on her. He's very handsome and popular with girls, and has five sisters. He later dates Mao's best friend, Chihiro.
Ai Sugimoto (杉本 愛, Sugimoto Ai)
Voiced by: Kanae Itō (Drama CD)
Hiro's coworker. She develops a crush on Hiro, but is rejected, when confessing her feelings to him. Like Mao, she loves samurai. She also likes reading novels and historical yaoi manga, and speaking with virtual friends. She's a fan of Mao's novel which brings them together and become friends; Mao often calls her "Radical" (Ai's pen name). At the end of the series, she eventually meets her virtual friend "Ruirui" who confesses his feelings for her and start dating.

=== Family ===
Hina Nakamura (中村 陽菜, Nakamura Hina)
Voiced by: Ayaka Saitō (Drama CD)
Hiro's and Daiki's sister. She's a middle school girl who is depicted as gloomy and reserved (similar to Mao in the beginning of the series). After the death of their parents, she moves away to live with relatives in Sendai. Towards the end of the series, Hiro convinces her to move back in with him and Daiki; at first, she doesn't want to because she thinks she caused her parents' death.
Yuzuno Hironaka
Mao's biological mother. Apathetic and cold, she left Mao (at that time, she was 7 years old) and her father after she decided to marry her boyfriend, whom she was cheating with for a couple of years. Towards the end of the series (Ch. 45), she attempts to reconcile with Mao, who she eventually denies her, understanding how she coldly abandoned her and her father.
Kaitou Motomiya
Voiced by: Tōru Ōkawa (Drama CD)
Mao's father. Ever since his divorce with Yuzuno, he pushes Mao away, causing her to be alone; he feels that Mao and Yuzuno left him behind. The reader finds out that he truly loved his ex-wife Yuzuno, but she cheated on him since the beginning of their marriage. He reconciles his relationship with Mao towards the end of the series.
Yui Motomiya
Voiced by: Rina Hidaka (Drama CD)
Mao's step-sister, an innocent and cheerful elementary school student. As the series progresses, she gets closer to Mao.
Mrs. Motomiya
Voiced by: Yurie Kobori (Drama CD)
Mao's step-mother. Extremely kind and caring, she patiently waits for Mao to accept her as her own mother.
Mr. Nakamura
Voiced by: Takayuki Kondō (Drama CD)
Mrs. Nakamura
Voiced by: Sayaka Ohara (Drama CD)
Otoha
Daiki's, Hina's and Hiro's cheerful cousin. She lived in the same household as Daiki in Kobe.
Kokoa
Daiki's, Hina's and Hiro's talkative cousin. She lived in the same household as Hina in Sendai.

=== Other characters ===
Fujita (藤田)
Voiced by: Kenji Akabane (Drama CD)
Hiro's and Ai's coworker. He has a crush on Ai.
Aoi Matsumoto (松本 蒼, Matsumoto Aoi)
Daiki's friend, and owner of the samurai themed cafe.

== Volumes ==
- 1 (September 13, 2010)
- 2 (December 13, 2010)
- 3 (May 13, 2011)
- 4 (October 13, 2011)
- 5 (February 13, 2012)
- 6 (June 13, 2012)
- 7 (November 13, 2012)
- 8 (April 12, 2013)
- 9 (September 13, 2013)
- 10 (February 13, 2014)
- 11 (July 11, 2014)
- 12 (December 12, 2014)
- 13 (June 24, 2015)

== Reception ==
Volume 5 reached the 19th place on the weekly Oricon manga chart and, as of February 19, 2012, has sold 36,674 copies; volume 6 also reached the 19th place and, as of June 17, 2012, has sold 40,564 copies; volume 9 reached the 44th place and, as of September 22, 2013, has sold 44,131 copies; volume 10 reached the 6th place and, as of February 16, 2014, has sold 39,452 copies.

It won the award for Best Shōjo Manga at the 38th Kodansha Manga Awards.

== See also ==
- Boku Dake ga Shitterundaze, another manga series by the same author
