= Sorry for My Familiar =

Japanese manga series

- First tankōbon volume cover

ウチの使い魔がすみません (Uchi no Tsukaima ga Sumimasen)
- Genre: Fantasy comedy
- Manga
- Written by: Tekka Yaguraba
- Published by: Kodansha
- English publisher: NA: Seven Seas Entertainment
- Magazine: Good! Afternoon
- Original run: January 7, 2016 – June 7, 2022
- Volumes: 11
- icon

Sorry for My Familiar (Japanese: ウチの使い魔がすみません, Hepburn: Uchi no Tsukaima ga Sumimasen) is a Japanese manga series written and illustrated by Tekka Yaguraba. It was serialized in Kodansha's seinen manga magazine Good! Afternoon from January 2016 to June 2022, with its chapters collected in eleven tankōbon volumes.

== Publication ==
Written and illustrated by Tekka Yaguraba, Sorry for My Familiar was serialized in Kodansha's seinen manga magazine Good! Afternoon from January 7, 2016, to June 7, 2022. Kodansha collected its chapters in eleven tankōbon volumes, released from September 7, 2016, to August 5, 2022.

In North America, the manga has been licensed for English release by Seven Seas Entertainment. The eleven volumes were released from March 13, 2018, to August 22, 2023.

=== Volumes ===
No.	Original release date	Original ISBN	English release date	English ISBN
1	September 7, 2016	978-4-06-388183-7	March 13, 2018	978-1-6269275-9-9
2	February 7, 2017	978-4-06-388235-3	July 10, 2018	978-1-626928-39-8
3	September 7, 2017	978-4-06-388286-5	November 6, 2018	978-1-626929-47-0
4	April 6, 2018	978-4-06-511226-7	April 23, 2019	978-1-642750-31-7
5	November 7, 2018	978-4-06-513564-8	August 20, 2019	978-1-642751-26-0
6	July 5, 2019	978-4-06-516363-4	January 21, 2020	978-1-64505-190-9
7	March 6, 2020	978-4-06-518782-1	November 10, 2020	978-1-64505-508-2
8	October 7, 2020	978-4-06-521056-7	June 22, 2021	978-1-64505-833-5
9	May 7, 2021	978-4-06-523143-2	March 1, 2022	978-1-64827-390-2
10	January 7, 2022	978-4-06-526552-9	December 27, 2022	978-1-63858-372-1
11	August 5, 2022	978-4-06-528767-5	August 22, 2023	978-1-68579-556-6
