= Ameku M.D.: Doctor Detective =

Japanese novel series and its adaptations

- First novel volume cover (original edition)

天久鷹央の推理カルテ (Ameku Takao no Suiri Karute)
- Genre: Medical, mystery
- Novel series
- Written by: Mikito Chinen
- Illustrated by: Noizi Ito
- Published by: Shinchosha (2014–2022); Jitsugyo no Nihon Sha (2023–present)
- Imprint: Shincho Bunko nex (September 29, 2014 – August 29, 2022); Jitsugyo no Nihon Sha Bunko (October 6, 2023 – present)
- Original run: September 29, 2014 – present
- Volumes: 13 (original); 19 (new edition)
- Manga
- Written by: Mikito Chinen
- Illustrated by: Hiroki Ohara
- Published by: Shinchosha
- Imprint: Bunch Comics
- Magazine: Monthly Comic @ Bunch
- Original run: April 21, 2016 – March 20, 2018
- Volumes: 4
- Manga

Sphere no Shitenshi
- Written by: Mikito Chinen
- Illustrated by: Eri Takenashi
- Published by: Kodansha
- Imprint: Good! Afternoon KC
- Magazine: Good! Afternoon
- Original run: September 6, 2024 – May 7, 2026
- Volumes: 3
- Anime television series
- Directed by: Kazuya Iwata
- Written by: Satoru Sugizawa; Yūko Kakihara
- Music by: Fox Capture Plan
- Studio: Project No.9
- Licensed by: Crunchyroll (streaming); SEA: Medialink
- Original network: Tokyo MX, GYT, GTV, BS11, Chukyo TV, ytv, QAB, Animax
- Original run: January 2, 2025 – April 3, 2025
- Episodes: 12
- Television drama

Ameku Takao's Detective Karte
- Directed by: Hisashi Kimura; Naoki Tamura; Yūta Yoshikawa; Hiroti Kashiwagi
- Produced by: Soei Hamada (TV Asahi); Ryunosuke Idei (Toei)
- Written by: Hideya Hamara
- Music by: Masahiro Tokuda
- Studio: TV Asahi; Toei Company
- Original network: ANN (TV Asahi)
- Original run: April 22, 2025 – June 24, 2025
- Episodes: 9
- icon

Ameku M.D.: Doctor Detective (Japanese: 天久鷹央の推理カルテ, Hepburn: Ameku Takao no Suiri Karute; lit. 'Ameku Takao's Mystery Medical Record') is a Japanese medical mystery novel series written by Mikito Chinen and illustrated by Noizi Ito. Shinchosha has published thirteen volumes from September 2014 to August 2022 under their Shincho Bunko nex imprint. The story revolves around a doctor who solves murders and medical mysteries at the department of diagnosis at a general hospital.

A manga adaptation illustrated by Hiroki Ohara was serialized in Shinchosha's seinen manga magazine Monthly Comic @ Bunch from April 2016 to March 2018, with its chapters collected into four tankōbon volumes. A new edition of the novel series by the same author and illustrator began publication by Jitsugyo no Nihon Sha in October 2023 under their Jitsugyo no Nihon Sha Bunko imprint. An anime television series adaptation produced by Project No.9 aired from January to April 2025. A television drama adaptation titled Ameku Takao's Detective Karte aired on TV Asahi and its affiliates from April to June 2025.

== Plot ==
Dr. Takao Ameku is the talented director of investigative pathology at Tenikai General Hospital, in charge of diagnosing patients the other hospital departments cannot. However, due to her keen eye of solving mysteries, Takao also gets involved with mysterious deaths and murders, all while dragging along her assistant Yu Takanashi in her various adventures.

== Characters ==
Takao Ameku (天久 鷹央, Ameku Takao)
Voiced by: Ayane Sakura (Japanese); Jaclyn Thomas (English)
Portrayed by: Kanna Hashimoto
She is the director of the Department of Investigative Pathology at Tenikai General Hospital, and is a vice-chairman of the hospital. Her division is in charge of diagnosing cases that cannot be diagnosed by any other physician in the hospital. She has the knack of solving mysteries to the level of a police detective, given her job is no stranger to cases involving mysterious deaths or murder. She lives in a brick house on the rooftop of the hospital, which also happens to be her office.
Yu Takanashi (小鳥遊 優, Takanashi Yū)
Voiced by: Kensho Ono (Japanese); Gerard Caster (English)
Portrayed by: Shouhei Miura
Takao's assistant at the Department of Investigative Pathology who helps her with her mystery-solving adventures. He, nicknamed "Kotori" by Takao, is also proficient in karate.
Mai Konoike (鴻ノ池 舞, Kōnoike Mai)
Voiced by: Manaka Iwami (Japanese); Katie Wetch (English)
Portrayed by: Mei Hata
A first-year resident at the hospital assigned to the Emergency Department.
Mazuru Ameku (天久 真鶴, Ameku Mazuru)
Voiced by: Nana Mizuki (Japanese); Molly Searcy (English)
Portrayed by: Nozomi Sasaki
Takao's older sister, and the only one she's scared of. She's greatly annoyed by Takao's laziness and often punishes her for it. However, she secretly deeply cares about her and is very proud of her skill, though she doesn't want to admit it.
Ōwashi Ameku (天久 大鷲, Ameku Ōwashi)
Voiced by: Fumihiko Tachiki (Japanese); Jason Douglas (English)
Portrayed by: Toshiro Yanagiba
He is the director at Tenikai General Hospital, and is Takao's uncle. He disapproves of Takao overstepping her bounds as a physician who only diagnoses cases unable to be diagnosed by others.
Ryūya Naruse (成瀬 隆哉, Naruse Ryūya)
Voiced by: Junichi Suwabe (Japanese); David Matranga (English)
One of the detectives at the police station that Ameku and Yu would help concerning some cases. Though he prefers her not to get involved, he is witness to her brilliance in solving strange cases.
Kimiyasu Sakurai (桜井 公康, Sakurai Kimiyasu)
Voiced by: Hiroaki Hirata (Japanese); Ben Bryant (English)
A senior detective from the police station who benefits from Takao's mystery-solving abilities. Unlike his partner Ryūya, he is more receptive to Takao's assistance.
Junko Sumida (墨田 淳子, Sumida Junko)
Voiced by: Miyuki Sawashiro (Japanese); Elisa Danielle James (English)
Chief of the Psychiatry Department who banned Ameku from the Psych Ward due to an incident when Ameku changed the medications on a patient which Junko misdiagnosed while the former was the latter's resident.

== Media ==
=== Novels ===
==== Original edition ====
| No. | Release date | ISBN |
|---|---|---|
| 1 | September 29, 2014 | 978-4-10-180010-3 |
| 2 | March 2, 2015 | 978-4-10-180027-1 |
| 3 | May 28, 2015 | 978-4-10-180035-6 |
| 4 | August 28, 2015 | 978-4-10-180044-8 |
| 5 | January 28, 2016 | 978-4-10-180057-8 |
| 6 | August 27, 2016 | 978-4-10-180076-9 |
| 7 | March 1, 2017 | 978-4-10-180090-5 |
| 8 | October 28, 2017 | 978-4-10-180109-4 |
| 9 | August 29, 2018 | 978-4-10-180133-9 |
| 10 | August 28, 2019 | 978-4-10-180162-9 |
| 11 | August 28, 2020 | 978-4-10-180197-1 |
| 12 | August 30, 2021 | 978-4-10-180223-7 |
| 13 | August 29, 2022 | 978-4-10-180246-6 |

==== New edition ====
| No. | Release date | ISBN |
|---|---|---|
| 1 | October 6, 2023 | 978-4-408-55834-9 |
| 2 | October 6, 2023 | 978-4-408-55835-6 |
| 3 | November 9, 2023 | 978-4-408-55844-8 |
| 4 | November 9, 2023 | 978-4-408-55845-5 |
| 5 | December 8, 2023 | 978-4-408-55854-7 |
| 6 | December 8, 2023 | 978-4-408-55855-4 |
| 7 | January 12, 2024 | 978-4-408-55860-8 |
| 8 | January 12, 2024 | 978-4-408-55861-5 |
| 9 | February 5, 2024 | 978-4-408-55865-3 |
| 10 | February 5, 2024 | 978-4-408-55866-0 |
| 11 | February 5, 2024 | 978-4-408-55867-7 |
| 12 | March 7, 2024 | 978-4-408-55872-1 |
| 13 | March 7, 2024 | 978-4-408-55873-8 |
| 14 | April 5, 2024 | 978-4-408-55878-3 |
| 15 | April 5, 2024 | 978-4-408-55879-0 |
| 16 | April 5, 2024 | 978-4-408-55880-6 |
| 17 | October 4, 2024 | 978-4-408-55913-1 |
| 18 | December 6, 2024 | 978-4-408-55920-9 |
| 19 | April 4, 2025 | 978-4-408-55942-1 |

=== Manga ===
A manga adaptation illustrated by Hiroki Ohara was serialized in Shinchosha's Monthly Comic @ Bunch from April 21, 2016, to March 20, 2018. The manga adaptation's chapters were collected into four tankōbon volumes from September 9, 2016, to June 9, 2018.

A second manga adaptation illustrated by Eri Takenashi, titled Ameku Takao's Detective Karte: Sphere no Shitenshi, was serialized in Kodansha's Good! Afternoon magazine from September 6, 2024, to May 7, 2026. The manga's chapters were collected into three tankōbon volumes released from January 22, 2025, to July 7, 2026.

==== Ameku Takao's Detective Karte ====
| No. | Release date | ISBN |
|---|---|---|
| 1 | September 9, 2016 | 978-4-10-771912-6 |
| 2 | March 9, 2017 | 978-4-10-771960-7 |
| 3 | November 9, 2017 | 978-4-10-772022-1 |
| 4 | June 9, 2018 | 978-4-10-772090-0 |

==== Ameku Takao's Detective Karte: Sphere no Shitenshi ====
| No. | Release date | ISBN |
|---|---|---|
| 1 | January 22, 2025 | 978-4-06-537952-3 |
| 2 | August 6, 2025 | 978-4-06-540374-7 |
| 3 | July 7, 2026 | 978-4-06-544080-3 |

=== Anime ===
An anime television series adaptation was announced on April 3, 2024. It is produced by Aniplex, animated by Project No.9, and directed by Kazuya Iwata, with Satoru Sugizawa handling series composition with Sugizawa and Yuko Kakihara writing the episode screenplays, Yuka Takashina designing the characters, and Fox Capture Plan composing the music. The series aired from January 2 to April 3, 2025, on Tokyo MX and other networks. (Note: Tokyo MX lists the series premiere on January 1, 2025, at 24:00, which is effectively January 2 at midnight JST.) The opening theme song is "Scope", performed by Aimer, while the ending theme song is "will be fine feat. Anly", performed by the Gospellers. Crunchyroll streamed the series. Medialink licensed the series in Southeast Asia.

A special event was held on Shinjuku Wald 9 on December 14, 2024, where the first episode was screened.

==== Episodes ====
| No. | Title | Directed by (Note: Production staff information is taken from the ending credits of each episode.) | Written by | Storyboarded by | Original release date |
|---|---|---|---|---|---|
| 1 | "Dr. Sherlock" | Masayuki Matsumoto | Satoru Sugisawa & Mikito Chinen | Kazuya Iwata | January 2, 2025 (Note: Episodes 1 and 2 premiered back to back, with Episode 1 premiering 30 mins earlier than the scheduled air time on Tokyo MX.) |
At Tenikai General Hospital Dr's Yu Takanashi and Mai Konoike struggle to diagnose two patients; a young boy with multiple symptoms and an elderly man with stomach pain. Yu's boss Takao Ameku, Head of investigative pathology, impatiently waits to start his tutoring sessions at the nearby Kurume Museum. Yu refuses to leave until his patients are diagnosed so Takao quickly diagnoses them using her incredible diagnostic and investigative abilities. The boy was accidentally overdosed on Vitamin A supplements by his mother, and the elderly man had a parasite from eating raw fish. A young man found on a construction site is brought in with his leg seemingly bitten off by an animal. The man is already dead but Yu notices the man's blood has turned blue. Takao is immediately obsessed with the mystery, but the Metropolitan Police reject her assistance. She is also warned to behave by her uncle, the hospital's Medical Director. Takao takes Yu to meet with Sakurai, a homicide detective who agrees to secretly share information. Takao points out the construction site is close to the Kurume Museum, which houses the only animal large enough to have bitten off the victim's leg, a Tyrannosaurus rex skeleton.
| 2 | "Blue Blood Cell and Dragon Fangs"; Transliteration: "Aoi Chi to Ryū no Kiba" (Japanese: 青い血と竜の牙) | Norihiko Nagahama | Satoru Sugisawa & Mikito Chinen | Dashiyo Hatsumi | January 2, 2025 |
Sakurai finds Kumade's blood on the T. Rex and reveals Kumade was a gang member. His body was discovered by construction workers who sought help from Dr. Hachisuka at a nearby clinic. Takao deduces Kumade was responsible for a shooting in Nerima City and Sakurai confirms Kumade shot a Yakuza boss and is believed to have been killed in revenge, risking a gang war. Takao finds more blue blood at the museum and deduces Hachisuka is the culprit and has Sakurai apprehend him when he breaks into the museum. Takao explains to Sakurai that Kumade must have been shot in the leg trying to escape the Yakuza, so he sought medical attention at Hachisuka's clinic. Unfortunately, Hachisuka accidentally overdosed Kumade on anesthetic, causing oxygen deprivation and turning his blood blue. Panicking, he took Kumade to the museum to treat him with Methylene Blue, a drug used to treat tropical fish that also reverses oxygen deprivation. When Kumade died anyway Hachisuka tried to hide the evidence he treated him by using the T-Rex head to sever Kumade's wounded leg and dumped his body at the construction site. Hachisuka then tried to break into the museum to remove the Methylene Blue bottle that has his fingerprints on it. Angered, Hachisuka tries to attack Takao but is knocked out by Yu. Takao and Yu return to her home, but find Takao's older sister Mazuru waiting to scold Takao for neglecting her job and continuing her unhealthy lifestyle.
| 3 | "Into the Spell of Shimmering Light"; Transliteration: "Senkō no Naka e" (Japanese: 閃光の中へ) | Asahi Yoshimura | Satoru Sugisawa | Akira Nishimori | January 9, 2025 |
After watching a video that supposedly kills people, a teenager named Mafuyu throws herself in front of a train but survives. Her twin sister Manatsu informs psychiatrist Dr. Sumida about the video but Sumida does not believe her, instead believing Mafuyu attempted suicide. Takao secretly interviews Mafuyu who remembers hearing a growling animal. Sumida forces Takao to leave, having previously banned Takao from the psychiatric ward. Takao locates the video and finds it filled with disturbing subliminal images but notices the video contains no sound, despite Mafuyu's claim she heard an animal. Manatsu is then brought to the hospital after falling down stairs when she watched the video again. Learning of Manatsu's case, Takao solves the mystery and demonstrates to Sumida that flashing lights causes both girls to unconsciously walk forward several steps before collapsing. With the twins being genetically identical, Takao diagnoses both girls with epilepsy, which causes involuntary movement, memory loss and hallucinations, explaining the animal heard by Mafuyu and why both girls were hurt falling off of something. With the mystery solved Takao refers the girls to a neurologist. Sumida grudgingly compliments Takao and she reveals to Yu that she used to be Sumida's resident. During one case, she realized Sumida misdiagnosed a patient, so she changed the patient's medications without authorization, leading Sumida to ban her from the psychiatric ward. Afterwards, Mazuru thanks Yu for staying with Takao, since every other doctor who tried quit after a few days, with Yu mentioning that he greatly respects Takao's intelligence which has saved lives.
| 4 | "Spontaneous Human Combustion"; Transliteration: "Kaen no Kyōki" (Japanese: 火焔の凶器) | Atsuji Tanizawa | Satoru Sugisawa | Dashiyo Hatsumi | January 23, 2025 (Note: Instead of airing the fourth episode, a TV special titled Ameku Takao's No-consultation Day (天久鷹央の休診日, Ameku Takao no Kyuushinbi) aired on January 16, with Ayane Sakura going to Mount Takao to offer prayers for the anime's success.) |
Takao is invited to meet Professor Muneharu Murota, who asks her to investigate a curse he fears has been placed on him. He explains that he has been studying the life of the infamous Onmyōji Enzo Ashiya, who is said to have cursed ten people to death. Recently, Murota and his team finally tracked down the location of Enzo's tomb and managed to unearth his corpse. However, shortly after, Murota began to contract coughing fits that antibiotics cannot seem to treat. Meanwhile, his partner Professor Ikari has also fallen gravely ill, leading him to conclude that they have been cursed by Enzo's spirit. Intrigued, Takao leads an expedition to Enzo's tomb and performs some tests on Enzo's corpse. She quickly discovers that the tomb's damp environment has become a breeding ground for fungal spores, and deduces that both Murota and Ikari were infected with Cryptococcus spores. Ikari developed meningitis due to taking immunosuppressants for an existing medical conditions, while Murota's respiratory system was already weakened by excessive smoking and developed fungal pneumonia. With Ikari delirious and refusing treatment, Takao enlists Sumida's aid in authorizing Ikari's involuntary hospitalization. Afterwards, both Murota and Ikari are hospitalized, Murota recovering but Ikari still in poor condition. Takao begins to study Enzo herself, and realizes that everybody who was cursed by Enzo died by fire. Meanwhile, Murota's assistant professor Aoi Kuromoto suddenly dies from an apparent spontaneous human combustion in her home.
| 5 | "Crimson Curse of the Sorcerer"; Transliteration: "Guren no Jujutsu-shi" (Japanese: 紅蓮の呪術師) | Norihiko Nagahama | Satoru Sugisawa | Dashiyo Hatsumi | January 30, 2025 |
Sakurai cannot explain how Aoi's body caught fire while the rest of her house was undamaged while Ikari dies in the hospital at the same time. Murota is convinced Enzo's curse will kill him next and hides himself away in his office. Yu attends Ikari's funeral and personally witnesses Ikari's corpse explode into flames. However, Sakurai quickly discovers a fire bomb had been placed in the coffin, suggesting Aoi's death was murder. Yu informs the police of a suspicious motorcyclist he saw outside the funeral home before the explosion. The motorcyclist later sends Yu a letter warning him all those who desecrated Enzo's grave will die. Shortly after, Yu's car is also set on fire. Yu sees the motorcyclist again and suddenly realizes who the culprit is and lures the motorcyclist into attacking him. After he and Mai apprehend him Yu confirms the motorcyclist responsible for the murders is Ashiya Yuuta, Enzo's descendant and current owner of the family estate where Enzo's tomb is located. Mai notes Yu took measures to ensure Takao did not get involved in the danger and is certain he has a crush on her. Yuuta admits to firebombing Yu's car and attempting to attack him, but denies being responsible for the deaths of Ikari and Aoi which he blames on the curse. Murota is suddenly brought to the hospital extremely ill and Yu notices a strange rash on his chest, just as Murota spontaneously bursts into flames.
| 6 | "Fierce Blazing Finale"; Transliteration: "Honō no Shūmaku" (Japanese: 炎の終幕) | Aya Kawamura | Satoru Sugisawa | Dashiyo Hatsumi | February 6, 2025 |
Takao tests a blood sample taken from Murota before the fire. The results confirm her suspicion, so she and Yu immediately confront the culprit, Murota's assistant Kagaya, as he is in the act of trying to set fire to Murota's storage shed and destroy the evidence. Takao reveals the cause of the spontaneous combustions was white phosphorus, a toxic chemical that causes numerous illnesses and notorious for igniting itself at temperatures as low as 50 °C (122 °F). Murota's safe in the shed contained old matches made from white phosphorus before the government banned them. Aoi's death was a genuine accident as she had taken a box of matches and had them in her pocket when they ignited. Murota however was murdered by Kagaya who admits to Sakurai he swapped Murota's matches with phosphorus ones and placed the fire bomb in Ikari's coffin to continue the ruse everything was being caused by Enzo's curse. Takao accuses him of lying about Murota's murder to protect the real culprit, Murota's daughter Haruka, who has a clear motive to want her father dead. From their medical records Takao reveals both Haruka and her mother have multiple domestic abuse injuries going back years. Haruka admits to swapping Murota's matches hoping to burn him to death, but when they did not ignite at first she started putting the phosphorus in his food, causing the skin rash. Her crime exposed, Haruka sets fire to the shed, hoping to burn to death but trapping Yu as well. Takao rescues them both riding Mai's bike through the fire. Kagaya is arrested for arson and Haruka for murder, though Takao hopes due to the circumstances they only receive short sentences. Meanwhile, Mazuru receives paperwork from former patients seeking to sue Takao for medical malpractice.
| 7 | "Prescribed Poison"; Transliteration: "Ōdāmeido no Dokuyaku" (Japanese: オーダーメイドの毒薬) | Asahi Yoshimura | Satoru Sugisawa | Jun'ichi Sakata | February 20, 2025 (Note: Instead of airing the seventh episode, a TV special titled Takao Ameku's Day Off: Ayane Sakura goes for a medical checkup (天久鷹央の休診日|佐倉綾音、人間ドックに行く, Ameku In Hisashi no kyūshin-bi) aired on February 13.) |
Momoka, the mother of Suzuhara Soichiro, the boy Takao diagnosed with vitamin A poisoning, accuses her of misdiagnosing him since Soichiro is still ill. As a result of the lawsuit Takao's uncle moves to close the Investigative Pathology Department. Other doctors believe Soichiro was being overdosed as some of his symptoms have improved, but he continues to have regular periods of serious illness. As a nurse herself, Momoka keeps interfering in Soichiro's treatments. Takao suspects something in the juice Momoko serves to Soichiro is poisoning him, yet tests on the juice find nothing poisonous. A comment from Mai gives Takao an epiphany; Soichiro doesn't like the juice because it tastes bitter. She thus demonstrates to Momoka and the hospital board members that Soichiro's sweet juice boxes actually contain bitter grapefruit juice. Grapefruit contains a chemical that interferes with the carbamazepine Soichiro takes to prevent seizures, giving him short periods of Carbamazepine overdose. Takao also demonstrates the juice boxes had been tampered with, replacing the juice with grapefruit via a syringe. Due to the timing of his illnesses and the medical knowledge required Takao accuses Momoka of poisoning Soichiro due to suffering from the psychiatric condition Munchausen syndrome by proxy, a mental disorder where parents harm their children so they can play the role of loving parents and gain sympathy from people around them. With Takao diagnosing Vitamin A overdose and ruining her plans, Momoka fabricated the lawsuit as revenge. Momoka is arrested for child abuse and the Investigative Pathology Department is reopened. As she celebrates with Yu and Mai, Takao receives an email about person named Miki Kenta being diagnosed with leukemia which upsets her deeply.
| 8 | "The Night When the Angels Danced [Part 1]"; Transliteration: "Tenshi no Mai Oriru Yoru Zenpen" (Japanese: 天使の舞い降りる夜 前編) | Atsuji Tanizawa | Yūko Kakihara | Jun'ichi Sakata | February 27, 2025 |
Dr. Kumakawa informs Takao three boys named Sekihara, Sakuta and Fuyumoto in room 703 all mysteriously grew sicker shortly before they were supposed to leave the hospital. There are also witnesses who saw an angel near their room. Takao, still upset about Miki, reluctantly agrees to examine the boys. Mai informs Takao the boys are bullies many staff and patients hate, suggesting their sudden symptoms are a result of foul play. Doctor Yamada, the boy's primary physician, reveals Fuyumoto is being discharged soon. Takao visits room 702, the latest visited by the angel, which happens to be Miki's room, an 8 year old boy with terminal leukemia. Miki is happy to see her, but Takao becomes so upset she runs away. Miki shows Yu and Mai his favorite book which contains a picture of the angel. His mother despises the boys from room 703, who bully Miki and destroyed his book, forcing her to buy a replacement. Kumakawa explains Takao diagnosed Miki with leukaemia when he was six, and became close with him until his leukaemia was cured. Unfortunately, the leukaemia returned and is now terminal. Takao reveals to Yu that Miki will be the youngest patient she has ever had die and blames herself for not being able to cure him. Yu tries to help her accept not all patients can be saved, but she refuses. Yu suspects she has already solved the mystery of both room 703 and the angel, but she refuses to tell him. Miki sees the angel in his room again, and seconds later Fuyumoto suffers a heart attack with Mai rushing to provide CPR.
| 9 | "The Night When the Angels Danced [Part 2]"; Transliteration: "Tenshi no Mai Oriru Yoru Kōhen" (Japanese: 天使の舞い降りる夜 後編) | Tomoya Takashima | Yūko Kakihara | Jun'ichi Sakata | March 6, 2025 |
Fuyumoto recovers from his heart attack, but the doctors are still puzzled how it happened. Takao deduces the culprit responsible for the boys growing sicker and the angel sightings. Without explaining, she announces to the three boys they are being sent home. Soon after Fuyumoto is caught stealing Adenosine triphosphate, a drug that can cause asthma attacks, vomiting and heart attacks, proving Takao's theory the boys were making themselves sicker. The boys admit they faked the angel by shining a torch through a picture of the angel from Miki's original book. Takao reveals the boys actually felt incredibly guilty about bullying Miki, having had no idea he was dying, so they faked the angel to convince Miki a guardian angel was waiting to take him to heaven. The boys apologize to Miki's mother before being sent home. Miki's health deteriorates rapidly and he asks to see Takao. At first she cannot bring herself to go, but eventually she visits Miki and reads him the angel story one last time, though Miki passes away before the ending. Takao hates herself for not doing more, but Yu reminds her doctors need to know the limits of their abilities in order to truly help their patients, including knowing when they are powerless to do anything. Takao spends the whole night crying but returns to work in the morning as normal. Yu notices Takao kept Miki's favorite hat in her office as a memento.
| 10 | "Drowning in a Dry Room [Part 1]"; Transliteration: "Misshitsu de Oboreru Otoko Zenpen" (Japanese: 密室で溺れる男 前編) | Asahi Yoshimura | Yūko Kakihara | Dashiyo Hatsumi | March 20, 2025 |
Yu is to be reassigned to Junsei University Hospital's General Medicine department to replace a doctor who can no longer work. Takao discovers the doctor, Kuwata Seiji, is a murder suspect. Meeting with Seiji's father Ryuichiro they learn Seiji is suspected of murdering his brother Daiki, who drowned alone in a locked room despite there being no water. Ryuichiro admits he hadn't seen Daiki in years, having disinherited him. He also admits Seiji was the son of his mistress, and when Daiki's mother found out she became unstable and eventually killed herself. The day Daiki died he had crashed Ryuichiro's 70th birthday party and attacked Seiji. Hours later Daiki called Ryuichiro from Ryuichiro's office in the house begging for help. Ryuichiro, his brother Kojiro, and a hospital employee rushed to the office which was locked, requiring Ryuichiro to unlock the door, and they found Daiki with his lungs filled with water. Daiki later died in hospital. Fearing Seiji may be involved, Ryuichiro had Daiki's cause of death listed as an illness, then cremated him without an autopsy. As a result the police suspect Daiki was murdered by Seiji and Ryuichiro tried to cover it up. Takao examines the study and Ryuichiro explains the door is normally unlocked and the only keys belong to him and Seiji. Seiji also has no alibi since instead of going to hospital after being attacked he claims he sat in his car for two hours. Takao interviews Dr. Akira who examined Daiki while he was still alive and confirms Daiki had water in his lungs. Dr. Yuko also confirms she didn't treat Seiji's head injuries from Daiki until the day after Daiki died. Takao argues with Yu and reveals she only wants to solve Daiki's murder so Seiji can return to his job and Yu won't have to transfer.
| 11 | "Drowning in a Dry Room [Part 2]"; Transliteration: "Misshitsu de Oboreru Otoko Chūhen" (Japanese: 密室で溺れる男 中編) | Atsuji Tanizawa | Yūko Kakihara | Dashiyo Hatsumi | March 27, 2025 |
Takao meets with Sakurai to get more information on the case. Sakurai reveals that Daiki was suspected of being involved in selling illegal stimulants, and also received a large sum of money from an unknown source. He also reveals that the police plan to formally arrest Seiji for Daiki's death, since all of the available evidence points to him being the only possible killer, especially since it is clear he is lying about his alibi. With no other choice, Takao and Yu track down Seiji to question him themselves. Seiji tells the same story he told the police, but Takao deduces that he was meeting Yuko in an illicit affair, observing that Seiji's head wound did not heal naturally, but was instead closed using Z-plasty, a technique a plastic surgeon like Yuko would know. Seiji admits that he is in an affair with Yuko, and lied about his alibi so as not to implicate her. However, despite Yuko being willing to back up Seiji's alibi, Sakurai points out the police will ignore it since Yuko has reason to protect Seiji as his lover. Takao and Yu then focus on trying to solve the case itself, and watch a video recording of when Daiki's body was discovered. Both Takao and Yu spot something odd in the video, and Takao lures the true suspect into a trap so she can confront them.
| 12 | "Drowning in a Dry Room [Part 3]"; Transliteration: "Misshitsu de Oboreru Otoko Kōhen" (Japanese: 密室で溺れる男 後編) | Takanari Hirayama | Yūko Kakihara | Kazuya Iwata, Dashiyo Hatsumi | April 3, 2025 |
The suspect turns out to be Kojiro. Takao explains that in the video of everyone discovering Daiki's body, Kojiro, a trained Cardiologist, failed to follow the proper steps to determine if Daiki was alive. She thus deduces he was actually removing illegal stimulant drugs from Daiki's pocket that Daiki had been paid by Kojiro to plant in Ryuichiro's office to ruin his reputation, allowing Kojiro to replace him as hospital Chairman. The police seize Kojiro and find the stimulants. Kojiro admits to everything except Daiki's murder. With no other suspect Sakurai still plans to arrest Seiji for Daiki's murder, meaning Yu's transfer will still be going ahead. While discussing the case Yu reminds Takao when Daiki attacked Seiji he didn't punch him, he head-butted him, causing her to instantly solve the case. She invites everyone involved back to Ryuichiro's office and reveals that by head-butting Seiji, Daiki had given himself a small Subarachnoid hemorrhage deep inside his brain. At first he had no symptoms, but after locking himself inside Ryuichiro's study to plant the stimulants for Kojiro the hemorrhage suddenly became worse and caused spontaneous Pulmonary edema, causing his lungs to fill with water from his own body. Having proof that Daiki accidentally caused his own death, Sakurai decides not to arrest Seiji. Yu's transfer is cancelled and he continues working with Takao, who hides how happy she is by jumping straight back into work, determined to tutor him for as long as it takes until he is as excellent a diagnostician as she is.

=== Drama ===
A television drama adaptation was announced on February 7, 2025. Co-produced by TV Asahi and Toei Company, the series is head-written by Hideya Hamada with episodes being directed by Hisashi Kimura, Naoki Tamura, Yūta Yoshikawa and Hiroti Kashiwagi with music by Masahiro Tokuda and produced by TV Asahi's Soei Hamada and Toei's Ryunosuke Idei and aired on TV Asahi and its affiliates from April 22 to June 24, 2025.

=== Radio show ===
On November 30, 2024, a radio show was announced, known as Nikkan Sakura Ayane Tensai Ameku Takao ni Naru 100 nichi Kan, with Ayane Sakura as the host. It is estimated to last until 100 episodes.

== Reception ==
By February 2024, the series had over 3 million copies in circulation.

== See also ==
- Patient Chart Prayer – Another novel by Mikito Chinen
- House – An American drama television series that follows the same premise
