= Boku Dake ga Shitterundaze =

Japanese manga series

- First tankōbon volume cover, featuring Minori Oura (left) and Waku Heike (right)

僕だけが知ってるんだぜ (Boku Dake ga Shitterundaze)
- Genre: Romantic comedy; Coming-of-age
- Manga
- Written by: Taamo
- Published by: Kodansha
- Imprint: Good! Afternoon KC
- Magazine: Good! Afternoon
- Original run: November 7, 2024 – present
- Volumes: 5

Boku Dake ga Shitterundaze (Japanese: 僕だけが知ってるんだぜ; lit. 'Only I Know') is a Japanese manga series written and illustrated by Taamo. It began serialization in Kodansha's Good! Afternoon magazine in November 2024, and has been compiled into five volumes as of October 2026.

== Premise ==
When Waku Heike transfers to a new high school and fails to introduce himself properly, he meets Minori Oura, a classmate whose older sister is the famous model Akari. She rarely smiles at school, and has a cool and aloof personality, similar to her older sister. However, after seeing her smile and befriending her, he vows to help Oura show her true side and enjoy their high school life together.

== Characters ==
Waku Heike (平家 和玖, Heike Waku)
Voiced by: Aoi Ichikawa (CM)
A second-year high school student, he was a hikikomori until he decides to transfer to a new high school, where he meets Minori Oura. After befriending her and discovers a cute side of her, he decides to help her make more friends, open up to others and enjoy high school. Even after he realizes Minori is Akari, he still treats her as usual.
Minori Oura (小裏 秋, Oura Minori)
Voiced by: Mayuka Ogō (PV)
Heike's classmate who also transferred in the same high school two months ago. She appears cool and aloof to match the image of her older sister, Akari Oura (邑楽 星, Oura Akari), who is a popular model with the stage name Akarin (あかりん). She becomes friend with Heike and gradually begins to show more of her emotions. It is later revealed that she is Akari herself and the "older sister" is a lie so that she can attend high school normally.

== Publication ==
The series is written and illustrated by Taamo. It began serialization in Kodansha's Good! Afternoon magazine on November 7, 2024. The first tankōbon volume was published on May 7, 2025; five volumes have been released as of October 2026.

No.	Release date	ISBN
1	May 7, 2025	978-4-06-539133-4
1. Ano Toki Taiiku Sōko ni Ite Yokatta (あの時体育倉庫にいて良かった); 2. Kimi no Namae ga Shiritai (君の名前が知りたい); 3. Nemurenai Yoru (眠れない夜); 4. Akarin (あかりん)
After Waku Heike transfers to a new high school and fails to introduce himself properly, he eats a cup noodle alone in the gym storage room. His classmate, Minori Oura, younger sister of the famous model Akari Oura (nicknamed Akarin), enters the room and shares their lunch together. She smiles awkwardly and mentions how she always needs to match her sister's cool image, making it hard to make new friends. Heike helps her by inviting their classmates for a social gathering that includes Oura. She later thanks him and they share their aspiration to change themselves for the better. They go on a shopping trip together to buy Heike's clothes for the gathering. After a brief encounter with their classmates Maki Yumeru and Rin Shindō, Heike buys a bear keychain for Oura, which she had mentioned that she has a large plushie of and that it looks like Heike. On their way home, he decides from then on to not talk about Akarin with her.
2	July 7, 2025	978-4-06-540043-2
5. Karaoke ga Tanoshimi de Shiyōganai (カラオケが楽しみでしようがない); 6. Onrain no Tomodachi (オンラインの友達); 7. Ganbaru (がんばる); 8. Himitsu ga Fueta (秘密が増えた)
Oura is not able to attend the karaoke gathering due to her sister's sudden work. The group disperses early, but Heike stays behind believing Oura will come. Oura rushes to the karaoke booth and is moved by Heike's kindness. The rest of the group rejoins as Heike had informed Maki about Oura. Oura becomes tearful as they enjoy karaoke together. Oura is reminded by her mother about the incident at her last school and that she does not need to try to smile so she can preserve the image of "Akarin". The class decides on creating a bunny maze for the school's cultural festival. During the preparation, Oura turns down a student's confession, and is relieved to see Heike who is following her. She thanks him for always helping her, and he tells her that she is the reason he is able to attend school now. After returning to the class, Oura is able to genuinely smile in front of others for the first time. During the cultural festival, Heike invites his online in-game friend, Ritsuki and is shocked to see that his friend is a girl. Heike, Ritsuki and her friend, Mio tour around the school, leaving Oura jealous. Oura later meets up and apologizes for yelling at him previously. Mio texts Heike, mentioning that she used to be a classmate with Oura in grade school and that she does not have an older sister.
3	December 5, 2025	978-4-06-541670-9
9. Kore wa Kitto Seishunda (これはきっと青春だ); 10. Ano Basho ni Kimi ga Iru Nante (あの場所に君がいるなんて); 11. Imouto (「妹」); 12. Iyasa Retakatta (癒やされたかった)
Heike and Oura have fun touring around the school, with Oura wearing a bunny mask to hide her identity. Heike is deeply moved by the play Earth acts in, which Oura notices. She later auditions for a lead role in a drama television series. Heike reads the text from Mio, but still believes that the mature Akarin is not the same as Oura. At the request from Maki, Heike goes to a store grand opening where Akarin is at. He later notices the bear keychain he gifted at Akarin's bag, and tearfully realizes that they are the same person and she always have to hide her true self as the guise of a younger sister. He later notices the overworked Oura after school; from the suggestion of his mother, he checks out a park nearby to plan on bringing Oura to relax. He accidentally comes across the filming of Akarin's television series and notices the nervous Akarin. He then pretended to be an obsessed fan, yelling words of encouragement and making an awkward smile at her. During school's lunch, Heike invites Oura to the park; she then hugs him, thanking him for helping her when she was Akarin.
4	May 7, 2026	978-4-06-543521-2
13. Chill Day; 14. Gendōryoku (原動力); 15. Hassha Mae (発車前); 16. Negaigoto (願いごと)
Heike does not get any useful ideas from his friends on what to do at the park, so he decides on making homemade bubbles. It ends up not being used as they relax and nap together. Maki suggests a group trip to Okinawa for the summer vacation, but Oura is not able to go as she will be filming in Kyoto. During the group's shopping trip, Heike suggests to go to Kyoto instead so that Oura can join in, which the group fully agrees on. During the trip's free time, Heike and Oura goes to Kurumazaki Shrine which is popular among celebrities. He assures that they will come back to leave their prayer stones with fulfilled wishes and look for the tamagaki board she had applied. Heike prays for her success and happiness, while she wishes the same for him, stating that he gives her strength and motivation, and that Heike's happiness is equivalent to hers.
5	October 7, 2026	978-4-06-545218-9
17. Fureru (触れる); 18. Oura–san wa Sugoi (小簔さんはすごい); 19. Hodokeru Yoru (ほどける夜); 20. Oura–san no Dorama (小裏さんのドラマ)
The next morning, Heike and Oura go for a walk and hold hands together for the first time. After the trip, Heike meets up with Ritsuki and Earth, where he asks for advice to pick a birthday present for Oura. Needing money to buy a present, he works at a noodle shop as a waiter, and is amazed by Oura's career and work ethics. They have a video call together on bed until morning, which Oura's mother notices. After a photo shoot, Oura is overwhelmed when she is forced to join an afterparty that she is unrelated to. Later, Heike meets up with Oura and gives her onigiri that he had made, which she loves. Oura invites Heike to her place to watch the premiere of the drama; while she is initially rattled by her acting debut, he comforts her, reassuring her that everything will be okay.

=== Chapters not yet in tankōbon format ===
These chapters have yet to be published in a tankōbon volume.

21. Hitoriaruki (独り歩き)
22. Natsunoyakusoku (夏の約束)

== Reception ==
In a web magazine Gooda's feature in 2025, Tehshin Hantaro featured the series, praising its setting, the protagonist's earnestness, and the expressions of the characters.

The series was nominated for the 12th Next Manga Awards in the print category in 2026.

== See also ==
- House of the Sun, another manga series by the same author
