= Tonight, I Have a Date with a Serial Killer =

Japanese manga series

- First tankōbon volume cover

今夜もシリアルキラーと待ち合わせ (Konya mo Shiriaru Kirā to Machiawase)
- Genre: Drama; Mystery; Supernatural
- Manga
- Written by: Kon Iguchi
- Illustrated by: Yūji Nakamura
- Published by: Kodansha
- English publisher: NA: Seven Seas Entertainment
- Imprint: Good! Afternoon KC
- Magazine: Good! Afternoon
- Original run: June 7, 2024 – present
- Volumes: 5
- Television drama
- Directed by: Hidetaka Sakamoto; Hiroki Inoue; Toshimitsu Iizuka
- Produced by: Kanae Nakabayashi (Kansai TV); Yusuke Kurosawa; Iori Suzuki; Naoya Watanabe
- Written by: Norikatsu Kodama; Kōta Edatsune
- Music by: Licaxxx
- Studio: Kansai TV; Television Nishinippon
- Original network: FNS (Kansai TV, TNC, Fuji TV)
- Original run: July 1, 2026 – September 16, 2026
- Episodes: 12
- icon

Tonight, I Have a Date with a Serial Killer (Japanese: 今夜もシリアルキラーと待ち合わせ, Hepburn: Konya mo Shiriaru Kirā to Machiawase) is a Japanese manga series written by Kon Iguchi and illustrated by Yūji Nakamura. It began serialization in Kodansha's seinen manga magazine Good! Afternoon in June 2024. A live-action television drama adaptation aired between July and September 2026.

== Synopsis ==
Shirou Isogai has made it his lifelong mission to hunt down and apprehend serial killers. He later gets tipped off about serial killer activity from an informant named Hinata Kuroi. Hinata has an ability to determine serial killers based on contact with them. Both of them have suffered from loss at the hands of serial killers, and decide to team up in order to track these killers.

== Characters ==
Shirou Isogai (磯貝史郎, Isogai Shirō)
Portrayed by: You Yokoyama
Hinata Kuroi (黒井ヒナタ, Kuroi Hinata)
Portrayed by: Nagisa Sekimizu
Kaede Tsuruoka (鶴岡楓, Tsuruoka Kaede)
Portrayed by: Hirona Yamazaki
Shinichi Makino (牧野信一, Makino Shinichi)
Portrayed by: So Okuno
Daigo Satake (佐竹大吾, Satake Daigo)
Portrayed by: Masahiro Toda
Kozue Hasegawa (長谷川梢, Hasegawa Kozue)
Portrayed by: Reia Yonekura

== Media ==
=== Manga ===
Written by Kon Iguchi and illustrated by Yūji Nakamura, Tonight, I Have a Date with a Serial Killer began serialization in Kodansha's seinen manga magazine Good! Afternoon on June 7, 2024. Its chapters have been collected in five tankōbon volumes as of August 2026. The series is licensed in English by Seven Seas Entertainment.

==== Volumes ====
No.	Original release date	Original ISBN	North American release date	North American ISBN
1	November 7, 2024	978-4-06-537469-6	March 17, 2026	979-8-89765-125-2
1. "The White-Artist Killer"; 2. "The One-Night Fianceé Killer 1"; 3. "The One-Night Fianceé Killer 2"; 4. "The One-Night Fianceé Killer 3"
2	April 7, 2025	978-4-06-539132-7	August 18, 2026	979-8-89765-175-7
5. "The One-Night Fianceé Killer 4"; 6. "The Human Hunter 1"; 7. "The Human Hunter 2"; 8. "The Human Hunter 3"; 9. "The Deathbed Recitalist 1"
3	September 5, 2025	978-4-06-540579-6	January 19, 2027	979-8-89863-100-0
4	March 6, 2026	978-4-06-542858-0	June 22, 2027	979-8-90209-072-4
5	August 6, 2026	978-4-06-544569-3	—	—

=== Drama ===
A live-action television drama adaptation was announced on May 29, 2026. The drama will be directed by Hidetaka Sakamoto, Hiroki Inoue, and Toshimitsu Iizuka, with scripts written by Norikatsu Kodama and Kōta Edatsune, and Licaxxx composing the music. It premiered on Kansai TV, TNC and Fuji Television and its affiliates as part of the "Suidora Eleven" programming block from July 1 to September 16, 2026. The opening theme song, "Shadow Memory" is performed by Soala and the ending theme song, "Saisaku" (Second Blooming), is performed by Super Eight.
