= World Conquest Zvezda Plot =

Japanese anime television series

- Limited edition cover of the first Blu-ray

世界征服〜謀略のズヴィズダー〜 (Sekai Seifuku: Bōryaku no Zuvizudā)
- Created by: hunting cap brothers
- Anime television series
- Directed by: Tensai Okamura
- Produced by: Toshihiro Maeda; Kozue Kaneniwa; Makoto Furukawa; Shinichirō Kashiwada; Kumiko Katō
- Written by: Meteo Hoshizora; Tensai Okamura
- Music by: Tatsuya Kato
- Studio: A-1 Pictures
- Licensed by: AUS: Madman Anime; NA: Aniplex of America
- Original network: Tokyo MX, GTV, GYT, MBS, TVA, BS11
- English network: SEA: Animax Asia
- Original run: January 11, 2014 – March 29, 2014
- Episodes: 12 + OVA
- Manga

4-koma no Zvezda
- Written by: Hori
- Published by: Ichijinsha
- Magazine: Manga 4koma Palette
- Original run: January 22, 2014 – October 22, 2014
- Manga
- Written by: Manatsu Suzuki
- Published by: Ichijinsha
- Magazine: Comic Rex
- Original run: January 27, 2014 – March 29, 2014
- Volumes: 3
- Manga

Junketsu no White Light
- Written by: Hamao
- Published by: Ichijinsha
- Magazine: Comic Rex
- Original run: January 27, 2014 – September 27, 2014
- Volumes: 1

World Conquest Zvezda Plot (世界征服〜謀略のズヴィズダー〜, Sekai Seifuku: Bōryaku no Zuvizudā; lit. 'World Conquest: Stratagem Star') is a Japanese anime television series produced by A-1 Pictures and directed by Tensai Okamura. It premiered on Tokyo MX, GTV and GYT on January 11, 2014. The series is written by Okamura and Meteor Hoshizora of the Japanese game company Type-Moon, with original character designs by Kouhaku Kuroboshi and Keigo Sasaki, and music by Tatsuya Kato.

Three manga adaptations began serialization in January 2014: one by Manatsu Suzuki and one by Hamao in Ichijinsha's Comic Rex magazine, and one by Hori in Manga 4koma Palette magazine. Aniplex USA has licensed the series from streaming and home video release in North America. Crunchyroll had added the series to its streaming. DAISUKI.net streamed the episodes as simulcast on their Website starting on 11 January with English subtitles for audience from US, Canada, South America, Africa (except Tunisia & Algeria), Europe (except Ireland, UK, France/German speaking areas), India, Russia and Middle East (all countries). Animax Asia began to add the series alongside Love, Chunibyo & Other Delusions season 2, Nisekoi, and Hamatora to premiere in Winter 2014 season. Aniplex Japan later released the series alongside Magical Warfare on March 19, 2014.

== Plot ==
World Conquest Zvezda Plot centers around a little girl named Kate Hoshimiya (also known as Lady Venera), who is at the helm of an organization called Zvezda, which has the purpose of World Conquest. In her organization she is joined by Itsuka Shikabane (also known as Lady Plamya), Natalia "Natasha" Vasylchenko (also known as Professor Um), Yasubee "Yasu" Morozumi, Goro Shikabane (also known as General Pepel), and a robot named Roboko. One day, Asuta Jimon, a middle school boy who ran away from home due to family issues, ends up meeting Kate on the street, and subsequently getting roped into joining Zvezda with them. However, in order to conquer the world, they must defeat an organization called White Light, which is contracted out by the Japanese government to defeat Zvezda and put an end to their plots of World Conquest once and for all. White Light is composed of Renge Komadori (also known as White Robin), Miki Shirasagi (also known as White Egret), and Kaori Hayabusa (also known as White Falcon).

== Characters ==
=== Main characters ===
Kate Hoshimiya (星宮 ケイト) / Lady Venera (ヴィニエイラ様, Vinieira-sama; Russian for "Venus")
Voiced by: Misaki Kuno
A young girl of undisclosed age, and the leader of Zvezda (Russian for "star"), a secret organization bent on conquering the world. Despite usually behaving as a child her age, Kate has a group of loyal followers that gathered around her out of respect, friendship or fear. She also possesses the secret power of persuading every being with a human heart to do her bidding. It is later revealed, that she is immortal resp. ageless and was the leader of Zvezda since countless millennia.
Asuta Jimon (地紋 明日汰) / Dva (ドヴァー, Dovā; Russian for "two")
Voiced by: Natsuki Hanae
Asuta is a second-year middle school student who ran away from home. After running into Kate and getting caught in one of Zvezda's conquests, he became a member of Zvezda. A running gag is how people he meets pronounce his name wrong, calling him Jimon Asatte (meaning day after tomorrow) or Jimon Shiasatte (meaning two days from tomorrow). Having no fighting power at all unlike his peers, Asuta becomes useful to Zvezda by his cooking skills; he nevertheless possess inexplicable skills at survival, often demonstrated by his repeated success at escaping with his life every time White Heron targets him. His Zvezda alter-ego, Dva, unintentionally won White Robin's heart after he saved her from being publicly humiliated by Zvezda. It is later revealed that he is the son of the governor of Tokyo. The name Dva if translated from Russian to English is the number two. So Asuta is literally Kate's #2 henchman.

=== Zvezda ===
Itsuka Shikabane (鹿羽 逸花) / Lady Plamya (プラーミャ様, Purāmya-sama; Russian for "flame")
Voiced by: Mariya Ise
A girl wearing an eye patch. She is the vanguard of the group and fights with a sword. She is Goro's daughter. She is easily irritated and usually has an angry demeanor, but is shown to have a great deal of affection for her leader Kate Hoshimiya. Shikabane is shown to have very poor culinary skills (her food actually make Asuta feel as though the world just ended after he tried it), and as a result, many of Zvezda's members skip dinner when she is cooking.
Natalia "Natasha" Vasylchenko (ナターシャ ヴァーセョルチェンコ)/Professor Um (ウーム教授, Ūmu kyōju; Russian for "intellect, mind")
Voiced by: Kana Hanazawa
A blonde girl who wears glasses. She is in charge of the science and technology for Zvezda. Her casual attire consists rarely of anything but black undergarments and a white lab coat. She speaks in Hiroshima dialect. Natasha originally came from Ukraine and was rescued by Kate from unknown beings (she called them "fairies") roaming the Ancient Udogawan tunnel between Ukraine and Japan.
Yasubee "Yasu" Morozumi (両角 安兵衛 (ヤス)) / Odin (アジーン, Ajīn; Russian for "one")
Voiced by: Kōsuke Toriumi
The self proclaimed "chief soldier" of Zvezda. In reality, Yasu is the only other low rank soldier other than Asuta Jimon. He has a tendency to get into trouble using Natasha's technology. Yasu is addicted to cigarettes, much to the resent of his fellow Zvezda members. He says he smokes them to uphold the "bad-boy image" he has worked hard to achieve. His loyalty to Zvezda stems from a fear of Kate Hoshimiya.
Goro Shikabane (鹿羽 吾郎) / General Pepel (ピェーペル将軍, Pyēperu shōgun; Russian for "ash")
Voiced by: Minoru Hirota
The largest member of Zvezda, Goro Shikabane utilizes handheld explosives to fight against his opponents. He is Itsuka's father. It is shown that he and Yasu Morozumi were gangsters in the past, with Yasu working under Goro. He has a penchant for sweets, as he is shown eating cakes and various desserts even in the midst of battle. He substitutes sweets for his past addiction to cigarettes. In the epilogue, he and his sister-in-law Kaori are married to each other.
Roboko (ロボ子)
Voiced by: Erii Yamazaki
A robotic girl. She joined Zvezda after meeting up with Natasha in the tunnels left behind by the ancient Udogawa civilization and being rescued by Kate. She eats udo as the source of her power.

=== White Light ===
Renge Komadori (駒鳥 蓮華) / White Robin (ホワイト ロビン, Howaito Robin)
Voiced by: M・A・O
One of Asuta's classmates. She is secretly Second Lieutenant White Robin, a member of the justice squad White Light and White Egret's subordinate. She has romantic feelings for Asuta, but initially had total disdain for his alter ego Dva after he accidentally acted perversely towards her as White Robin. She is clumsy at school, which she attributes to fatigue from her work as White Robin. Together with Miki, she is tasked with stopping Zvezda's world conquest. Despite her desire to bring justice, she is willing to disobey her superiors if she believes that their orders are unjust.
Miki Shirasagi (白鷺 美酒) / White Egret (ホワイト イーグレット, Howaito īguretto)
Voiced by: Minako Kotobuki
Another one of Asuta's classmates. She is secretly Sergeant White Egret, a member of White Light and is a proficient fighter, capable of taking on both Plamya and General Pepel at the same time. She is a model student at school who excels at sports and gets the top grades on exams. Together with Renge, she is tasked with stopping Zvezda's world conquest. She will carry out any orders intended to bring justice by her superiors even if she believes they are unjust.
Kaori Hayabusa (隼房 香織) / White Falcon (ホワイト ファルコン, Howaito Farukon)
Voiced by: Maaya Sakamoto
A voice actress who is also an agent for White Light called White Falcon. She is the voice of the heroine in Kate's favorite TV show Robo Butler under the alias Kaorin Machimoto. She is Goro's sister-in-law and Itsuka's aunt. She has a strong hatred towards Zvezda for causing the death of her older sister Tsubaki. In the epilogue, with her marriage to Goro, she joined Zvezda.

=== Other characters ===
Kyoshiro Jimon (地紋 京志郎)
Voiced by: Takaya Kuroda
Asuta's father, as well as the Governor of Tokyo. He has been keeping a close watch on the activities of Zvezda and uses military force to stop them. He is on a quest to annex all of Japan to become part of Tokyo so that he can rule all of Japan. He is quick to resort to military force which eventually causes him to lose the support of the Prime Minister.
Tsubaki Shikabane (鹿羽 椿)
Goro's deceased wife, Itsuka's mother, and Kaori's older sister. Her death led Kaori to join White Light.
Pierre (ピエール)
A pastry chef who was once a member of Goro's gang. He sacrifices himself to allow Goro to escape with the military force in pursuit. In the epilogue, it is revealed that he survived.

== Episode list ==
No.	Title	Directed by	Written by	Original release date
1	"Conquer All Humanity"; Transliteration: "Jinrui Mina Seifuku" (Japanese: 人類皆征服)	Tensai Okamura	Meteo Hoshizora	January 11, 2014
A young runaway named Asuta Jimon has a chance encounter with a young girl while wandering the streets at night. Little does he know this cute little girl, Hoshimiya Kate, is really the leader of Zvezda, an organization bent on world conquest. Taking her talk of world conquest as a simple flight of fancy Asuta walks with her and plays along to an extent. He soon realizes the import of her words when he is confronted with a swarm of dangers and strange happenings.
2	"From The Dinner Table to The Graveyard"; Transliteration: "Shokutaku Kara Hakaba Made" (Japanese: 食卓から墓場まで)	Directed by : Naomichi Yamato; Storyboarded by : Tensai Okamura	Meteo Hoshizora	January 18, 2014
Asuta having wondered the streets all night sleeps through school. After the bell, he is greeted by Itsuka, a member of Zvezda, who was sent to bring him back to Zvezda's secret headquarters, coerced with the promise of food he follows her. Asuta is dismayed by the horrible quality of the food Itsuka herself prepared, as were the Zvezda members, most of which ran out on the meal. There is an introduction to another secret society in this episode, White Light. To make things worse, Zvezda's giant biological weapon is deployed prematurely, forcing the members of Zvezda to subdue it. That said and done with, a fight breaks out about Itsuka's questionable cooking ability, after which it is resolved that Asuta should do the cooking and also teach Itsuka how to cook.
3	"Gone With the Smoke"; Transliteration: "Kemuri ni Maite Sarinu" (Japanese: 煙に巻いて去りぬ)	Directed by : Emi Yamashita; Storyboarded by : Tensai Okamura	Tensai Okamura	January 25, 2014
After booting Yasu out of the hideout for smoking, the group go out for a meal, only to have their experience ruined by more smokers. Having had enough, Kate declares war on smokers, soon rallying the city's residents to drive them out of town. This ends up pushing the remaining smokers to their most desperate, resulting in a chaos that neither Zvezda nor White Light can vanquish.
4	"UDOs Fall to the Cold Ground"; Transliteration: "UDO wa Tsumetai Tsuchi no Naka ni" (Japanese: UDOは冷たい土の中に)	Directed by : Kana Shundo; Storyboarded by : Yumi Kamakura	Meteo Hoshizora	February 1, 2014
The Zvezda hideout's energy source, generated from the Udo that grows underneath the base, ceases to supply power. Kate, Asuta, Natasha, and Roboko go underground to investigate what is causing the Udo to die out.
5	"White Robin in Danger"; Transliteration: "Howaito Robin Kiki Ippatsu!" (Japanese: ホワイトロビン危機一髪！)	Chie Yasutoki	OKSG	February 8, 2014
As Kate tasks the others with figuring out the secret identity of White Light's captain, White Robin, Asuta suspects that it may be his classmate, Renge Komadori.
6	"The After-School Treasure Club (Part 1)"; Transliteration: "Hōkago Hihō Kurabu (Zenpen)" (Japanese: 放課後秘宝倶楽部（前編）)	Directed by : Takashi Ando; Storyboarded by : Atsushi Takahashi	Shōtarō Suga	February 15, 2014
Kate and Roboko enroll into Asuta's class and, together with Asuta and Renge, they investigate a mysterious After School Treasure Club and infiltrate it.
7	"The After-School Treasure Club (Part 2)"; Transliteration: "Hōkago Hihō Kurabu (Kōhen)" (Japanese: 放課後秘宝倶楽部（後編）)	Directed by : Naomichi Yamato; Storyboarded by : Tensai Okamura	Shōtarō Suga	February 22, 2014
The Treasure Club turns out to be a trap laid out by White Light's White Egret, aka Miki Shirasagi, whilst Asuta and Kate come across a more incredible and dangerous treasure.
8	"The Falcon Has Landed"; Transliteration: "Hayabusa wa Maiorita" (Japanese: ハヤブサは舞い降りた)	Directed by : Chie Yasutoki; Storyboarded by : Masahiro Ando	Meteo Hoshizora	March 1, 2014
White Light's commander, White Falcon, aka Kaori Hayabusa, hatches a plan to trick Kate into bringing her into her hideout.
9	"Masked Battle in the Steam"; Transliteration: "Yukemuri Kamen Butōkai" (Japanese: 湯煙仮面武闘会)	Directed by : Eiichi Kuboyama; Storyboarded by : Chie Yasutoki	OKSG	March 8, 2014
Both Zvezda and White Light coincidentally have company vacations at a masked hot spring inn, where Asuta (as Dva) and Renge (as White Robin) get to know each other. Objecting to this, Miki launches her attack, during which Renge stands to protect Dva, learning of his identity as Asuta.
10	"Not So Quiet on the West Udogawa Front"; Transliteration: "Nishi Udogawa Sensen Ijō Ari" (Japanese: 西ウド川戦線異状あり)	Directed by : Yoshihiro Kimura; Storyboarded by : Mamoru Kurosawa	Meteo Hoshizora	March 15, 2014
West Udogawa is in a state of emergency as White Light declares war on Zvezda and destroys their base, having Kate and the others on the run.
11	"All That Remains After the Conqueror's Dreams"; Transliteration: "Seifuku-sha-domo ga Yume no Ato" (Japanese: 征服者どもが夢のあと)	Directed by : Hiroyuki Okuno; Storyboarded by : Tensai Okamura	Meteo Hoshizora; OKSG	March 22, 2014
With the city taken over by White Light and many of the Zvezda members captured, Asuta contemplates what he should do.
12	"May the Light of Zvezda Shine Throughout This World!!"; Transliteration: "Warera ga Zuvizudā no Hikari o Amaneku Sekai ni!!" (Japanese: 我らがズヴィズダーの光をあまねく世界に！！)	Directed by : Naomichi Yamato; Storyboarded by : Tensai Okamura	Meteo Hoshizora	March 29, 2014
The members of Zvezda gather for the final battle against Asuta's father, the Governor of Tokyo, to make their very first step to world domination.
OVA	"New Zvezda Operation"; Transliteration: "Shin Zuvizuda Daisakusen" (Japanese: 新・ズヴィズダー大作戦)	Directed by : Naomichi Yamato; Storyboarded by : Atsushi Takahashi	Shōtarō Suga	October 15, 2014
