= My Master Has No Tail =

Japanese manga series

- First tankōbon volume cover

うちの師匠はしっぽがない (Uchi no Shishō wa Shippo ga Nai)
- Genre: Fantasy comedy; Historical
- Manga
- Written by: TNSK
- Published by: Kodansha
- English publisher: NA: Kodansha USA
- Magazine: Good! Afternoon
- Original run: January 7, 2019 – January 5, 2024
- Volumes: 12
- Anime television series
- Directed by: Hideyo Yamamoto
- Written by: Touko Machida; Kei Shimobayashi; Aya Satsuki; Yūho Togashi
- Music by: Tsukasa Yatoki; Atsushi Harada; Yuki Honda
- Studio: Liden Films
- Licensed by: Sentai Filmworks: SA/SEA: Medialink
- Original network: Tokyo MX, MBS, BS Asahi
- Original run: September 30, 2022 – December 23, 2022
- Episodes: 13
- icon

My Master Has No Tail (Japanese: うちの師匠はしっぽがない, Hepburn: Uchi no Shishō wa Shippo ga Nai) is a Japanese manga series written and illustrated by TNSK. It was serialized in Kodansha's seinen manga magazine good! Afternoon from January 2019 to January 2024, with its chapters collected in twelve tankōbon volumes. An anime television series adaptation produced by Liden Films aired from September to December 2022.

== Characters ==
Mameda (まめだ)
Voiced by: M.A.O
A tanuki girl.
Bunko (文狐)
Voiced by: Hibiku Yamamura
A seven tailed kitsune.
Shirara Tsubaki (椿 しらら, Tsubaki Shirara)
Voiced by: Lynn
Byakudanji Tsubaki (椿 白檀治, Tsubaki Byakudanji)
Voiced by: Takuya Eguchi
Sakujiro (作次郎, Sakujirō)
Voiced by: Ayumu Murase
Omatsu (お松)
Voiced by: Natsuki Aikawa
Koito (小糸)
Voiced by: Ikumi Hasegawa
Rakuda (らくだ)
Voiced by: Yūichirō Umehara
Enshi Kirino (霧の圓紫, Kirino Enshi)
Voiced by: Ayana Taketatsu
Utaroku Ebisuya (恵比寿家 歌緑, Ebisuya Utaroku)
Voiced by: Akira Ishida
Buncho Daikokutei (大黒亭 文鳥, Daikokutei Bunchō)
Voiced by: Junichi Suwabe
Mameda's father (まめだの父, Mameda no Chichi)
Voiced by: Junya Enoki

== Media ==
=== Manga ===
My Master Has No Tail is written and illustrated by TNSK. The series was serialized in Kodansha's good! Afternoon from January 7, 2019, to January 5, 2024. Kodansha has collected its chapters into individual tankōbon volumes. Twelve volumes were released from September 6, 2019, to February 7, 2024. The manga is licensed digitally in North America by Kodansha USA.

No.	Original release date	Original ISBN	English release date	English ISBN
1	September 6, 2019	978-4-06-517007-6	December 7, 2021	978-1-6369-9504-5
2	December 6, 2019	978-4-06-517932-1	January 4, 2022	978-1-6369-9547-2
3	May 7, 2020	978-4-06-519472-0	February 1, 2022	978-1-6369-9600-4
4	October 7, 2020	978-4-06-520912-7	March 1, 2022	978-1-6369-9639-4
5	March 5, 2021	978-4-06-522663-6	May 3, 2022	978-1-6849-1112-7
6	August 5, 2021	978-4-06-524517-0; 978-4-06-524723-5 (SE)	June 7, 2022	978-1-6849-1158-5
7	January 7, 2022	978-4-06-526555-0	July 5, 2022	978-1-6849-1208-7
8	June 7, 2022	978-4-06-528218-2	December 6, 2022	978-1-6849-1581-1
9	October 6, 2022	978-4-06-529509-0	May 30, 2023	978-1-6849-1945-1
10	February 7, 2023	978-4-06-530565-2	October 3, 2023	979-8-8893-3179-7
11	July 6, 2023	978-4-06-532224-6	April 30, 2024	979-8-8893-3452-1
12	February 7, 2024	978-4-06-534480-4	September 17, 2024	979-8-8893-3694-5

=== Anime ===
An anime television series adaptation was announced in the September 2021 issue of good! Afternoon. It is produced by Liden Films and directed by Hideyo Yamamoto, with Touko Machida supervising the scripts co-written by Kei Shimobayashi, Aya Satsuki, and Yūho Togashi. Ryō Yamauchi is designing the characters and serving as chief animation director. Tsukasa Yatoki, Atsushi Harada, and Yuki Honda from Arte Refact composed the music. The series aired from September 30 to December 23, 2022, on Tokyo MX, MBS, and BS Asahi. The opening theme song is "Genai Yūgi" (幻愛遊戯; lit. 'Fleeting Love Game') by Garnidelia, while the ending theme song is "Virginia" (ヴァージニア, Vājinia) by Hinano. Sentai Filmworks licensed the series and is streaming it on Hidive. Medialink licensed the series in Asia-Pacific and is streaming it on its Ani-One Asia YouTube channel.

No.	Title	Directed by	Written by	Storyboarded by	Original release date
1	"I'll Become a Rakugoka!"; Transliteration: "Watashi, Rakugoka ni Naru!" (Japanese: 私、落語家になるっ！)	Kazuya Fujishiro	Touko Machida	Hideyo Yamamoto	September 30, 2022
Mameda, a young tanuki, leaves her family to visit Osaka, hoping to play pranks on hapless humans. Her archaic antics are thwarted by her lack of understanding of city life in the Taisho era. However, she is fascinated by the young female rakugoka, Bunko Daikokutei, who holds an audience spellbound with a story told simply by her words and a fan.
2	"Just Go Ahead and Try to Steal My Technique"; Transliteration: "Uchi no Gei, Nusumeru Mon nara Nusundemi" (Japanese: ウチの芸、盗めるもんなら盗んでみ)	Hideyo Yamamoto & Yoshitsugu Kimura	Kei Shimobayashi	Hideyo Yamamoto	October 7, 2022
3	"Watch Carefully"; Transliteration: "Yō Shigoto Mitoki" (Japanese: よう仕事見とき)	Yutaka Hirata	Aya Satsuki	Hideyo Yamamoto	October 14, 2022
4	"It's the Mistakes You See, Not the Ones You Don't"; Transliteration: "Misen Hetakuso yori, Miseru Hetakuso ya" (Japanese: 見せん下手くそより、見せる下手くそや)	Dede Yokoyama	Touko Machida	Hideyo Yamamoto	October 21, 2022
5	"Mejiro, Hamachi, Buri"; Transliteration: "Mejiro, Hamachi, Buri" (Japanese: メジロ、ハマチ、ブリ)	Kazuya Fujishiro	Aya Satsuki	Hideyo Yamamoto	October 28, 2022
6	"The Audience is Food!"; Transliteration: "Kyaku wa Kuimono!" (Japanese: 客は食い物！)	Yutaka Hirata	Kei Shimobayashi	Hideyo Yamamoto	November 4, 2022
7	"You'll Stumble Again and Again with the First Step"; Transliteration: "Hajime no Ippo wa Koronde Nanbo" (Japanese: はじめの一歩は転んでなんぼ)	Fumihiro Matsui	Touko Machida	Hideyo Yamamoto	November 11, 2022
8	"Nobody in Their Right Mind Becomes a Performer"; Transliteration: "Shōki Yattara Geinin Yatte Hennen" (Japanese: 正気やったら芸人やってへんねん)	Toshiyuki Anzai	Aya Satsuki	Hideyo Yamamoto	November 18, 2022
9	"There's No Point If It Isn't Master"; Transliteration: "Shishō ja Nakya Iminain da" (Japanese: 師匠じゃなきゃ意味ないんだ)	Tsutomu Murakami	Kei Shimobayashi	Hideyo Yamamoto	November 25, 2022
10	"Why Not Me?"; Transliteration: "Nande Ate wa Akan no ka" (Japanese: 何でアテはあかんのか)	Yutaka Hirata	Yūho Togashi	Hideyo Yamamoto	December 2, 2022
11	"Let My Art End With You"; Transliteration: "Ore no Gei, Omae de Owarasetekure yo na" (Japanese: オレの芸、お前で終わらせてくれよな)	Hideyo Yamamoto	Yūho Togashi	Hideyo Yamamoto	December 9, 2022
12	"There's No Point to You Being Interesting"; Transliteration: "Kimi ga Omoshirokucha Imiganai" (Japanese: 君が面白くちゃ意味がない)	Satoshi Nakagawa	Touko Machida	Hideyo Yamamoto	December 16, 2022
13	"You Taught Me Everything, Master"; Transliteration: "Zenbu Shishō ga Oshiete Kureta" (Japanese: 全部師匠が教えてくれた)	Hideyo Yamamoto & Dede Yokoyama	Touko Machida	Hideyo Yamamoto	December 23, 2022

== Reception ==
In 2020, the manga was one of the 50 nominees for the 6th Next Manga Awards in the print category.
