= Generation Witch =

Japanese manga series

- Cover of the first volume

現代魔女図鑑 (Gendai Majo Zukan)
- Genre: Slice of life
- Manga
- Written by: Uta Isaki
- Published by: Ichijinsha
- English publisher: NA: Seven Seas Entertainment
- Magazine: Monthly Comic Rex
- Original run: December 27, 2013 – April 27, 2016
- Volumes: 5

Generation Witch (Japanese: 現代魔女図鑑, Hepburn: Gendai Majo Zukan) is a Japanese manga series written and illustrated by Uta Isaki. It was serialized in Ichijinsha's magazine Monthly Comic Rex from December 2013 to April 2016, with its individual chapters collected into five volumes.

Set in a modern world where one percent of the world's population are witches, the plot, told in an anthology format, follows various witches and their interactions between fellow witches and non-witches. The series has received positive reviews, with critics praising the characters and story, while being divided on the artwork. Some critics felt the story was not very strong.

== Plot ==
In Generation Witch, witches with magical powers make up one percent of the world's population, and are accepted by society as a minority group. It is set in the city of Toma (based on Hamamatsu, Shizuoka^{Vol. 5}), which is protected by a "great witch". The series follows the daily lives of witches and how they interact with both witches and non-witches.

The plot is told in an anthology format, with each chapter having a new lead and story.

== Publication ==
Written and illustrated by Uta Isaki, the series began serialization in Ichijinsha's magazine Monthly Comic Rex on December 27, 2013. It completed its serialization on April 27, 2016. Its individual chapters were collected into five tankōbon volumes.

In October 2016, Seven Seas Entertainment announced that they licensed the series for English publication.

=== Volumes ===
No.	Original release date	Original ISBN	English release date	English ISBN
1	June 27, 2014	978-4-75-806452-1	July 25, 2017	978-1-62-692533-5
2	January 27, 2015	978-4-75-806491-0	November 14, 2017	978-1-62-692586-1
3	June 27, 2015	978-4-75-806513-9	September 25, 2018	978-1-62-692693-6
4	November 27, 2015	978-4-75-806553-5	April 30, 2019	978-1-62-692808-4
5	May 27, 2016	978-4-75-806584-9	November 19, 2019	978-1-62-692955-5

== Reception ==
Ross Locksley of UK Anime Network liked the story, setting, and characters, which he felt were emotional. He also praised the artwork and cover of the first volume. Theron Martin of Anime News Network liked the plot twists and the latter chapters, though he also felt the story had too many tropes and lacked sufficient world building. He felt the artwork was fine, but not particularly unique. Sean Gaffney of A Case Suitable for Treatment described it as "pretty solid [though] not groundbreaking"; he also felt the length of the series was "just about right". A columnist for Kono Manga ga Sugoi!'s website praised the characters and artwork. They described the series as a "fun ensemble drama".
