= List of Shomin Sample chapters =

The following is a list of chapters for the light novel, and manga series Shomin Sample.

== Light novel ==
Special editions were made for volumes 5, 7, and 10 which were released on the same dates as their counterparts.

No.	Release date	ISBN
1	November 19, 2011	978-4758042734
2	April 20, 2012	978-4758043182
3	July 20, 2012	978-4758043557
4	October 20, 2012	978-4758043731
5	February 20, 2013	978-4758044042
6	May 18, 2013	978-4758044318
7	September 20, 2013	978-4758044639
7.5	January 18, 2014	978-4758045186
8	July 18, 2014	978-4758045810
9	January 20, 2015	978-4758046688
10	October 20, 2015	978-4758047616
11	July 20, 2016	978-4758048521

== Manga ==
A special edition was made of the seventh volume.

No.	Original release date	Original ISBN	English release date	English ISBN
1	October 27, 2012	978-4-758063-41-8	May 3, 2016	978-1-626923-21-8
01. "Welcome Commoner"; 02. "Allow Me to Kiss You"; 03. "Maiden with a Pure Heart"; 04. "Gotcha!"; Extra Manga Chapter 1: "Kimito"; Extra Manga Chapter 2: "Aika"; Extra Manga Chapter 3: "Reiko"
2	May 27, 2013	978-4-758063-78-4	August 30, 2016	978-1-626923-20-1
05. "Hakua-sama Did What?"; 06. "As if I would make such an admission!!"; 07. "A Club Commoner Meeting"; 08. "The Tea Party Incident"; 09. "Commoner Party"; 10. "I Dislike You!!"; Extra Manga Chapter 4: "Hakua"; Extra Manga Chapter 5: "Karen"
3	September 27, 2013	978-4-758064-11-8	November 8, 2016	978-1-626923-55-3
11. "Love + Girlfriend"; 12. "Now, Is It About Time for You to... Strip?"; 13. "Just A Normal Day Off With Hakua"; 14. "Just Friends"; 15. "Big Commotion"; 16. "That's my life's purpose?!"
4	January 27, 2014	978-4-758064-26-2	February 14, 2017	978-1-626924-25-3
17. "Someone Please Be Tenkubashi-san's Partner"; 18. "Come Out Here"; 19. "But a Newbie Shouldn't Pick Yogasim"; 20. "I Am Pleased on Your Behalf"; 21. "Ms. Angrily Naive's Main Characteristic"; 22. "The Head Maid Starts Her Mornings Early"
5	July 18, 2014	978-4-758064-65-1	May 16, 2017	978-1-626923-74-4
23. "Edamame Are Baby Soybeans"; 24. "First Half: Aika-san Has Lots of Friends"; 24. "Last Half: Who Watches the Watcher?!"; 25. "Are You Highlighting Your Assets?"; 26. "Kagurazaka-sama Is Here!!"; 27. "You Ran in Such a Fashion as to Ruffle the Pleats of Your Skirt?!"
6	January 20, 2015	978-4-758064-88-0	August 15, 2017	978-1-626925-15-1
28. "I've Been Meaning to Ask, What is "Get's"?; 29. "Have You Not Gazed Upon This Same Sky, Kimito-Sama?"; 30. "We'll Go and Talk to Them."; 31. "You Have that Backward!!"; 32. "I Shall Make Your Every Day Miserable."; Side Story: Oh, Carrier Pigeons. I Remember Those Times."
7	July 27, 2015	978-4-758065-20-7	November 28, 2017	978-1-626925-78-6
33. "Just Like How They Depict Ninjas in America"; 34. "You Super Horrible Singer!!"; 35. "I Don't Really Have a Reason, But..."; 36. "Just A Normal Day Off With Hakua: Part 2"; 37. "He's Gay"; 38. "I Think It's a Girl Kind of Thing, But"; 39. "Shijimi"
8	October 27, 2015	978-4-758065-51-1	March 20, 2018	978-1-626927-03-2
40. "Via the Enormous Undulations of Complementarity"; 41. "Who Rides Upon a White Horse"; 42. "June Bride Ball"; 43. "This is the Last Rabbit"
9	January 27, 2016	978-4-758065-64-1	November 20, 2018	978-1-626928-55-8
44. "HetaReiko"; 45. "The Girl Who Stands Behind"; 46. "Because My Pants are Down Now!!!"; 47. "It's Almost As If Two Platinum Bars are Next to Each Other"; 48. "Cheers for the Rose Tea Alliance!"; 49. "IT WOULD NOT BE APPROPRIATE FOR YOUR EYES"
10	July 27, 2016	978-4-758066-04-4	August 6, 2019	978-1-642751-25-3
50. "It's Time To Hear You Out"; 51. "The Legendary Phoenix Had Just Hatched From Its Egg!"; 52. "Oh My! It's Nice To Be Young"; 53. "How Should I Let Her Go?"; 54. "When Everything Stopped For A Moment"; Side Story: Extra
11	January 27, 2017	978-4-758066-43-3	November 19, 2019	978-1-642757-31-6
55. "Roll Your Eyes Correctly!"; 56. "A Lady's Tweet"; 57. "Bamboo!!"; 58. "Like A Storm"; 59. "A Scary Delicious Food"
12	July 27, 2017	978-4-758066-71-6	April 21, 2020	978-1-645052-42-5
60. "Oh My!"; 61. "Memories Return"; 62. "Who Will You Marry?; 63. "Stars"; 64. "A Relaxing Night"; 65. "The Pencil Case You're Looking For Is On The Desk"; 65.5. "Choice"
13	December 27, 2017	978-4-758067-02-7	November 3, 2020	978-1-64505-507-5
66. "Land Of Canaan"; 67. "I...Remember It Now"; 68. "As Soon As I Sweat"; 69. "I Get Wet"; 69.5: "The Conversation Between A Charismatic Mother And A Clumsy Daughter"; 70. "Elements?!"; 70.5. "Epilogue"
14	June 6, 2018	978-4-758067-42-3	January 26, 2021	978-1-64505-786-4
71. "Argh - Now I Don't Know What To Do Anymore!"; 72. "They're Going To Have Lots Of Children!"; 73. "Glory Be To Thou"; 74. "I'm Sure Of It"; 75. "I'm Still Dressed Down There!!"; 76. "Yet We Just Had A Really Good Talk"
15	December 27, 2018	978-4-758067-80-5	April 27, 2021	978-1-64505-997-4
77. "I've Been Tainted By Kimito"; 78. "Or Rather, I Want To See Them"; 79. "Mai Mai"; 80. "She Was In A Total Different League Than Me"; 81. "W-What Are You Looking At!?"

== Spinoff ==
No.	Release date	ISBN
1	January 27, 2016	978-4-7580-6565-8
2	July 27, 2016	978-4-7580-6605-1
