= Is Love the Answer? =

Japanese manga series

- Cover of the volume

きみのせかいに恋はない (Kimi no Sekai ni Koi wa Nai)
- Genre: Coming-of-age
- Manga
- Written by: Uta Isaki
- Published by: Kodansha
- English publisher: NA: Kodansha USA
- Magazine: Hatsu Kiss
- Original run: August 25, 2020 – January 25, 2021
- Volumes: 1

Is Love the Answer? (Japanese: きみのせかいに恋はない, Hepburn: Kimi no Sekai ni Koi wa Nai) is a Japanese manga series written and illustrated by Uta Isaki. It was serialized in Kodansha's magazine Hatsu Kiss from August 2020 to January 2021, with its individual chapters collected into a single volume.

== Plot ==
Chika has always been unique from her peers. However, this becomes particularly obvious when her peers become interested in the opposite sex. When Chika tries to find a boyfriend and fails, she realizes she does not share that interest and believes there must be something wrong with her. But upon enrolling at a university in Tokyo, she meets people who accept her for who she is and help her to understand herself better.

== Publication ==
Written and illustrated by Uta Isaki, the series began serialization in Kodansha's Hatsu Kiss magazine on August 25, 2020. The series completed its serialization on January 25, 2021. The series' individual chapters were collected into a single volume, which was released digitally on March 20, 2021.

In January 2022, Kodansha USA announced that they licensed the series for English publication. They released the volume digitally on January 10, 2023, and in print one week later.

== Reception ==
Rebecca Silverman of Anime News Network praised the story's emphasis on acceptance and personal growth. However, she also felt the story was not very conclusive. A columnist for Booklist felt the story had a good balance of informational and emotional content. They also liked the artwork, describing it as "soft and evocative". They concluded by calling the series "a valuable and affirming manga about acceptance of self and others". Christel Scheja of Splash Comics praised the story, particularly in the way it depicts asexuality, which he described as "touching".

The series was included on the 2024 Great Graphic Novels for Teens list by the Young Adult Library Services Association. It was also selected as one of the top ten titles for teen readers on the American Library Association Rainbow Book List in the same year.
