= 7thGarden =

Japanese manga series

- Cover of the first manga volume
- Genre: Action; Dark fantasy; Romance
- Manga
- Written by: Mitsu Izumi
- Published by: Shueisha
- English publisher: NA: Viz Media
- Imprint: Jump Comics SQ.
- Magazine: Jump Square
- Original run: August 4, 2014 – March 4, 2017 (on hiatus)
- Volumes: 8
- icon

7thGarden (stylized as 7thGARDEN) is a Japanese manga series written and illustrated by Mitsu Izumi. It was serialized in Shueisha's Jump Square from August 2014 to March 2017. It was later announced that the manga would be moved to the Jump SQ. website. However, no new chapter has been released since then. In North America, the series is licensed for English language release by Viz Media.

== Plot ==
Set in a world with two moons, humanity lives under the rule of powerful angels and the influence of a dominant religion known as Antiquolism. In the Holy Kingdom of Braith, a gardener named Awin Gardner lives in a rural village and yearns for a peaceful life. While attempting to defeat a monster known as the "Demon of Karna", he instead awakens a demon woman named Vide, who had been sealed for a thousand years. Vide declares her intention to kill the angels who rule the world and seeks to make Awin her wielder.

At first Awin refuses, but when knights from the kingdom attack his village and threaten the people he cares about, he forms a contract with Vide in order to protect them. Vide transforms into a powerful demonic weapon that Awin can wield, allowing him to fight against the forces in his way.

== Publication ==
Written and illustrated by Mitsu Izumi, 7thGarden was serialized in Shueisha's Jump Square from August 4, 2014, to March 4, 2017. In March 2017, it was announced that the manga would be moved to the Jump SQ. website starting on May 2, 2017. However, it was later announced that it would begin on June 2, 2017. Nevertheless, the chapter was not released on that date and no new chapter has been released since then. Shueisha has collected its chapters into individual tankōbon volumes. The first volume was released on December 4, 2014. As of May 2, 2017, eight volumes have been released.

In North America, the series is licensed for English language release by Viz Media.

=== Volumes ===
No.	Original release date	Original ISBN	English release date	English ISBN
1	December 4, 2014	978-4-08-880265-7	July 5, 2016	978-1-4215-8721-9
2	May 1, 2015	978-4-08-880342-5	October 4, 2016	978-1-4215-8722-6
3	September 4, 2015	978-4-08-880474-3	January 3, 2017	978-1-4215-8723-3
4	December 4, 2015	978-4-08-880551-1	April 4, 2017	978-1-4215-9022-6
5	April 4, 2016	978-4-08-880659-4	July 4, 2017	978-1-4215-9165-0
6	August 4, 2016	978-4-08-880758-4	October 3, 2017	978-1-4215-9431-6
7	December 2, 2016	978-4-08-880830-7	January 2, 2018	978-1-4215-9585-6
8	May 2, 2017	978-4-08-881054-6	April 3, 2018	978-1-4215-9819-2

== See also ==
- Magus of the Library, another manga series by the same author
