= Magus of the Library =

Japanese manga series

- First tankōbon volume cover, featuring Theo Fumis

圕の大魔術師 (Toshokan no Daimajutsushi)
- Genre: Adventure; Fantasy
- Manga
- Written by: Mitsu Izumi
- Published by: Kodansha
- English publisher: NA: Kodansha USA
- Magazine: Good! Afternoon
- Original run: November 7, 2017 – present
- Volumes: 10
- icon

Magus of the Library (Japanese: 圕の大魔術師, Hepburn: Toshokan no Daimajutsushi (Note: To represent the Japanese word for "library" (図書館, Toshokan), the title uses the character 圕, a rare abbreviation created in the 20th century.)) is a Japanese manga series written and illustrated by Mitsu Izumi. It has been serialized in Kodansha's seinen manga magazine Good! Afternoon since November 2017, with its chapters collected in ten tankōbon volumes as of June 2026.

== Plot ==
Set in a world where books are highly valued, the series follows Theo Fumis, a book-loving boy who aspires to become a Kafna—an elite librarian skilled enough to work at the Central Library, located in the city of Aftzaak. Theo endures discrimination due to his mixed-race heritage and impoverished life in the small village of Amun, where he is ostracized for his pointed ears. After a Kafna named Sedona Bleu counsels him to become a protagonist rather than wait for one, Theo resolves to become a Kafna himself. Seven years later, he travels to Aftzaak to take the difficult librarian examination at the Central Library, growing through encounters with diverse people and cultures along the way.

== Publication ==
Written and illustrated by Mitsu Izumi, Magus of the Library has been serialized in Kodansha's seinen manga magazine Good! Afternoon since November 7, 2017. Kodansha has collected its chapters into individual tankōbon volumes. The first volume was released on April 6, 2018. As of June 5, 2026, ten volumes have been released.

In North America, Kodansha USA announced the English language release of the manga in October 2018. The first volume was released on July 9, 2019.

=== Volumes ===
No.	Original release date	Original ISBN	English release date	English ISBN
1	April 6, 2018	978-4-06-511243-4	July 9, 2019	978-1-63236-823-2
1. "The Ugly, Long-Eared Child"; 2. "The Hero Atop the Ebony Steed"; 3. "What the Books Give Back"; 4. "Dawn of a New Romance"
2	November 7, 2018	978-4-06-513566-2	September 24, 2019	978-1-63236-845-4
5. "A Sister to Be Wed"; 6. "Two Book Bandits and a Girl Who Can't Get It Right"; 7. "A Roar Like Thunder"; 8. "Make Haste, Long Ears!"; 9. "The Wings of the Tolling Bell"
3	August 7, 2019	978-4-06-516736-6	February 25, 2020	978-1-63236-846-1
10. "A Mask and a Magus"; 11. "Do Kafna Dream of Provincial Sheep?"; 12. "A Syndrome of Certitude"; 13. "The Boy and the Old Woman"; 14. "The Boy I Raised"
4	June 5, 2020	978-4-06-519471-3	January 26, 2021	978-1-63236-916-1
15. "The Continent is Small, Fly on Syrrana"; 16. "Blood Will Be Drawn When Nobles Draw Forth"; 17. "An Almost Transparent Future"; 18. "Acting the High and Mighty Regal Curatrix"; 19. "Reunion at Aftzaak"
5	June 7, 2021	978-4-06-523523-2	December 14, 2021	978-1-64651-213-3
20. "For She Is Gifted"; 21. "A Girl Captivated by the Stars"; 22. "A Teacher's Winning Formula"; 23. "Night on the Pop Lit Railroad"; 24. "The Lights in the Falling Stars Are Mana"
6	June 7, 2022	978-4-06-528198-7	March 7, 2023	978-1-64651-405-2
25. "Full Focus"; 26. "I Want to Kick You in the Face"; 27. "The Dawn Will Break"; 28. "You Are a Sage"; 29. "The Melancholy of Tutull Xiu"
7	June 7, 2023	978-4-06-531799-0	May 28, 2024	978-1-64651-582-0
30. "Vessel of Sand"; 31. "Inza Fumis"; 32. "Give My Regards to the Book"; 33. "Heed the Library Code"; 34. "Not Just a Novel"
8	June 6, 2024	978-4-06-535756-9	May 27, 2025	979-8-88877-450-2
35. "The Only Two Ways to Bring a Nation to Ruin"; 36. "The Protections Office Goes it's Way"; 37. "Ready to Intercept at Any Moment"; 38. "I Will Protect You"; 39. "One Hundred Years of Solitude"
9	June 6, 2025	978-4-06-539701-5	May 18, 2027	979-8-90074-148-2
40. "Steward's Verdict"; 41. "The Weight of Being"; 42. "Stay Earnest"; 43. "The Endless Tale"; 44. "Confession Mask"
10	June 5, 2026	978-4-06-543899-2	—	—
45. "Thirst for Fiction"; 46. "Festival Height"; 47. "Clash of Wills"; 48. "Proposal and Doubt"; 49. "The Shagrazzat Chronicle"

=== Chapters not yet released in tankōbon format ===
50. "Curiosity Incarnate / The Vow"
51. "Fresh Start"
52. "The Assignment"
53. "Departure"
54. "Lying Adults"
55. "Weight of Truth"
56. "Unseen Threat"
57. "A Quiet Ripple"

== Reception ==
The series ranked 12th on the "Nationwide Bookstore Employees' Recommended Comics of 2018" by the Honya Club website. The series ranked 50th on the 2021 "Book of the Year" list by Da Vinci magazine. French newspaper Le Figaro selected Magus of the Library as one of their six recommended manga featured at the 2019 Paris Book Fair. It was nominated for the 18th Manga Taishō in 2025 and ranked fourth with 69 points.

== See also ==
- 7thGarden, another manga series by the same author
