= Monthly Comic Rex =

Japanese manga magazine

- Cover of the July 2008 issue of Monthly Comic Rex featuring characters from Kannagi. Illustration by Eri Takenashi.
- Categories: Shōnen manga
- Frequency: Monthly
- Circulation: 100,000
- Publisher: Ichijinsha
- First issue: December 9, 2005
- Country: Japan
- Language: Japanese
- Website: Monthly Comic Rex

Monthly Comic Rex (月刊 Comic REX, Gekkan Comic REX) is a Japanese shōnen manga magazine published by Ichijinsha. The first issue was sold on December 9, 2005, and is sold monthly on the ninth. Manga collected into bound volumes which were serialized in this magazine are published under Ichijinsha's Rex Comics (REXコミックス, REX Komikkusu) imprint.

The four-panel comic strip magazine Manga 4koma Kings Palette started as a special edition of Comic Rex before becoming an independent magazine, as did the cross-dressing-themed manga magazine Waai!.

== Serialized titles ==
- 30-sai no Hoken Taiiku
- Appli-Trap
- Arknights: Operators!
- Black Sweep Sisters
- Boku ga Josō shite Hīte mitara Baresō na Ken
- Bus Gamer
- Cylcia=Code
- Cynthia the Mission
- Dear Emily...
- Eden*
- Engaged to the Unidentified
- Eru Eru Sister
- Etrian Odyssey II: Snow Girl
- Kaii Ikasama Hakuran Tei
- Gakuen Tengoku Paradoxia
- Gau Gau Wāta
- Gene Cha!
- Generation Witch
- Gunjin Shōjo, Ōritsu Mahō Gakuen ni Sennyū Suru Koto ni Narimashita. ~Otome Game? Sonna no Kiitemasen kedo?~
- Gyakushū! Pappara-tai
- Hand×Red
- Heroine Voice
- Himegoto
- Himena Kamena
- Hundred: Radiant Red Rose
- Jū Ten!
- Jūsho Mitei
- Kamiari
- Kannagi: Crazy Shrine Maidens
- Kanpachi: Crazy Seriola Dumerili
- Yuripachi: Loose a Morning-star Lily (YuruYuri & Kanpachi)
- Kare to Kanojo no Kyōkaisen
- Ki o Tsukena yo, Onē-san.
- Kigyō Sentai Salary Man
- Kuroji Tabiki: Chaos Aisle
- Kyonyū to Loli to Boyish
- Little Busters! Kudryavka Noumi
- Long Riders!
- Macross Delta: Ginga o michibiku Utahime
- Masamune-kun no Re nantoka
- Masamune-kun's Revenge
- Meikyū Gai Rondo: Hareta Hi ni wa Tsurugi o Motte.
- Memeru-san no Shitsuji
- Mida Love
- Miss Caretaker of Sunohara-sou
- Mitgura
- Ms, Rinna's Lovesickness!
- Mugen Ryōiki
- My Wife is the Student Council President
- Na Na Ki!!
- Niji to Kuro (ongoing)
- No Matter What You Say, Furi-san is Scary!
- Onigokko
- Oni Hime
- Onimai: I'm Now Your Sister!
- Ore to Maid to Tokidoki Okan
- Ore Yachō Kansatsuki
- Orichalcum Reycal Duo
- Reverend D
- Rin-chan now
- Roripo Unlimited
- Sei Kai Ibun
- Senran Kagura: Guren no Uroboros
- Shinozaki Himeno no Koigokoro Q&A
- Shirasuna-mura
- Shiritsu Sairyō Kōkō Chōnōryoku-bu
- Shomin Sample
- Shōnen Blanky Jet
- Sōkai Kessen
- SoltyRei: Aka no Shukujo
- Sora Yome
- Soul Gadget Radiant
- Tadashii Kokka Tsukurikata.
- Take Moon
- Tales of Berseria
- Tales of Legendia
- Tanakaha
- The Idolmaster
- Asayake wa Kogane-iro: The Idolmaster (ongoing)
- The Idolmaster: Cinderella Girls
- The Idolmaster: Relations
- The Ode to the Esperides
- The Wizard of Battlefield
- Touhou Bōgetsushō: Silent Sinner in Blue
- Tsuki to Otakara
- Twinkle Saber Nova (ongoing)
- Wish Upon the Pleiades: Prism Palette
- World Conquest Zvezda Plot
- Yatogame-chan Kansatsu Nikki (ongoing)
- Yes Lolita! but Father?
