= Good! Afternoon =

Japanese manga magazine

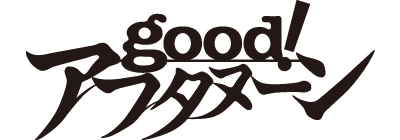

- Cover of issue #7 (first anniversary issue), featuring Teppu
- Editor-in-Chief: Akira Kanai
- Categories: Seinen manga
- Frequency: Bimonthly (2008–2012); Monthly (2012–present)
- Circulation: 27,000; (October 2018 – September 2019)
- Publisher: Kodansha
- First issue: November 7, 2008
- Country: Japan
- Based in: Tokyo
- Language: Japanese
- Website: afternoon.kodansha.co.jp/goodafternoon

Good! Afternoon (Japanese: good! アフタヌーン, Hepburn: Guddo! Afutanūn; stylized as good! Afternoon or good! AFTERNOON) is a Japanese seinen manga anthology magazine published by Kodansha. It is a sister magazine to Kodansha's manga anthology Monthly Afternoon, and was first launched on November 7, 2008. New issues are published on the 7th of each month.

Its existence came around the same time other spin-off magazines under Kodansha, like Morning Two for Morning and Bessatsu Shōnen Magazine for Weekly Shōnen Magazine, were launched and had successful titles of their own. With Good! Afternoon, its approach was toward a more younger audience compared to its parent magazine.

Initially published bimonthly, Good! Afternoon switched to a monthly publication schedule starting with the 25th issue in November 2012. Each issue typically has around twenty stories by various artists and runs about 700–800 pages. Each issue sells for 770 yen. It had a circulation of 27,000 from October 1, 2018, to September 30, 2019.

== Currently running manga series ==
Title	Author / Artist	Premiered
Boku Dake ga Shitterundaze (僕だけが知ってるんだぜ)	Taamo	November 7, 2024
Drifting Dragons (空挺ドラゴンズ)	Taku Kuwabara	June 7, 2016
Dungeon Elf: What's a Dungeon without Treasure Chests? (ダンジョンエルフ 〜ダンジョンに宝箱があるのは当たり前ですか〜)	River Slan	July 5, 2024
Fujoshing Out!!	Tamar	October 8, 2026
Glass Kōbō no Renkinjutsu-shi (ガラス工房の錬金術師)	Yuki Kamba (art), Maki Sakura (original story), Lino (character designs)	August 7, 2025
Grand Blue Dreaming (ぐらんぶる)	Kenji Inoue (story) and Kimitake Yoshioka (art)	April 7, 2014
Hōkago Isekai Futari Tabi (放課後異世界ふたり旅)	Norimitsu Kaihō (story) and Mei Aida (art)	April 5, 2025
Magus of the Library (圕の大魔術師)	Mitsu Izumi	November 7, 2017
Majo no Hanaya-san (魔女の花屋さん)	Sou Hamayumiba	November 7, 2023
New Jigokudo Reikai Tsushin (新・地獄堂霊界通信)	Hinowa Kozuki (story) and Mimori (art)	October 7, 2020
Oni no Engawa (鬼の縁側)	Kyōka Iwabuchi	July 7, 2026
Shamballad (シャンバラッド)	Kei Mayama	February 7, 2025
Strayboy Overkill	Oouchi (art), Sōzō Adamuno (story), Nyalra (original concept), Ohisashiburi (character designs)	April 7, 2026
Tomoshibi kara Sparkle (灯火からスパークル)	Gido Amagakure, Saki Noguchi (supervision)	April 7, 2026
Tonight, I Have a Date with a Serial Killer (今夜もシリアルキラーと待ち合わせ)	Kon Iguchi (story) and Yūji Nakamura (art)	June 7, 2024
Tori Ma Torimasu (とりまとります)	TNSK	August 7, 2025
Under Edge (アンダーエッジ)	Juuroku Hirao	May 7, 2026
Witchcraft Works Extra (ウィッチクラフトワークス EXTRA)	Ryū Mizunagi	March 7, 2022

== Past serializations ==
=== 2000s ===
- Jiraishin Diablo (地雷震 Diablo) by Tsutomu Takahashi (2008–2011)
- Kyo Musume (巨娘) by Kon Kimura (2008–2017) (moved from Monthly Afternoon)
- Maria the Virgin Witch (純潔のマリア) by Masayuki Ishikawa (2008–2013)
- Natsu no Zenjitsu (夏の前日) by Motoi Yoshida (2008–2014)
- Paradise Residence (パラダイスレジデンス) by Kōsuke Fujishima (2008–2012) (transferred to Monthly Afternoon)
- Shūkyū Shōjo (蹴球少女) by Hiroaki Wakamiya (2008–2014)
- Teppu (鉄風) by Moare Ohta (2008–2015)
- Sayabito: Swords of Destiny (サヤビト) by Uta Isaki (2009–2013)
- Billionaire Girl (ビリオネアガール) by Isuna Hasekura (story) and Asuka Katsura (art) (2009–2013)
- Nanika Mochigatte Masuka (なにかもちがってますか) by Mohiro Kitoh (2009–2015)

=== 2010s ===
- Loveplus: Kanojo no Kako (ラブプラス カノジョの過去) by Hiroaki Wakamiya (2010)
- Witchcraft Works (ウィッチクラフトワークス) by Ryū Mizunagi (2010–2022)
- Kyōmen no Silhouette (鏡面のシルエット) by Yuna Kagesaki (2010–2013)
- Trial Ride (トライアルライド) by Seiji Uozumi (story) and Chieko Kobayashi (art) (2011–2012) (moved from Monthly Afternoon)
- Aku no Kyoten (悪の教典) by Yusuke Kishi (story) and Eiji Karasuyama (art) (2012–2015)
- Ajin: Demi-Human (亜人) by Gamon Sakurai (2012–2021)
- The Case Files of Biblia Bookstore (ビブリア古書堂の事件手帖) by En Mikami (story) and Ryō Kōda (art) (2012–2013)
- K: Stray Dog Story (K ストレイ・ドッグ・ストーリー) by GoRA (story) and Yui Kuroe (art) (2012–2013)
- Outbreak Company (アウトブレイク・カンパニー 萌える侵略者) by Ichirō Sakaki (story) and Kiri Kajiya (art) (2012–2014)
- Sweetness and Lightning (甘々と稲妻) by Gido Amagakure (2013–2018)
- Hanebado! (はねバド!) by Kōsuke Hamada (2013–2019)
- Miss Monochrome (ミス・モノクローム -Motto Challenge-) by Kazuyuki Fudeyasu (story) and Nana Tōno (art) (2014)
- Unlimited Fafnir (銃皇無尽のファフニール) by Tsukasa (story) and Saburouta (art) (2014–2015)
- Maria the Virgin Witch Exhibition (純潔のマリア exhibition) by Masayuki Ishikawa (2014)
- Occultic;Nine (オカルティック・ナイン) by Chiyomaru Shikura (original story) and Gunji (art) (2015–2017)
- U12 by Hiroaki Wakamiya (2015–2019)
- Sorry for My Familiar (ウチの使い魔がすみません) by Tekka Yaguraba (2016–2022)
- Iron Snow (アイアンスノー) by Yoko Hano (2018–2020)
- My Master Has No Tail (うちの師匠はしっぽがない) by TNSK (2019–2024)
- Dēryizu (デーリィズ) by Megochimo (2019–2022)
- Tettsui to Pieta (鐵槌とピエタ) by Mari Mafuyu (2019–2020)

=== 2020s ===
- Natsume no Sekai: Ikai Taimaden (棗のセカイ－異界退魔伝－) by Hiroaki Wakamiya (2020–2021)
- A Galaxy Next Door (おとなりに銀河) by Gido Amagakure (2020–2023)
- Love Score (ラブスコア) by LEN [A-7] (2020–2021)
- Suika (スイカ) by Mori Tonkatsu (2020–2024)
- Towa × Baretto: Kaijū Gakuen (永久×バレット -怪獣学園-) by Morion Kokuu (story) and Gendo (art) (2020–2022)
- Isekai Shachūhaku Monogatari: Outrunner PHEV (異世界車中泊物語 アウトランナーPHEV) by Guym Haga (story) and Marimo Tomori (art) (2022–2025)
- The Pool by Gamon Sakurai (2024–2025)
- Ameku Takao's Detective Karte: Sphere no Shitenshi (天久鷹央の推理カルテ スフィアの死天使) by Mikito Chinen (story) and Eri Takenashi (art) (2024–2026)

== Circulation ==
Year / Period	Monthly circulation	Magazine sales (est.)
October 2013 to September 2014	35,000	420,000
October 2014 to September 2015	30,000	360,000
October 2015 to September 2016	30,000	360,000
October 2016 to September 2017	27,000	324,000
October 2017 to September 2018	27,000	324,000
October 2018 to September 2019	27,000	324,000
October 2013 to September 2019	29,333	2,112,000
