= Nio Nakatani =

Japanese manga artist known for Bloom Into You

- Born: November 25; Shiga, Japan
- Education: Kyoto Seika University
- Occupation: Manga artist
- Writing career
- Pen name: Rireba (リレバ)
- Language: Japanese
- Period: 2010–present
- Genres: Yuri; Romance; Fantasy
- Notable works: Bloom Into You; God Bless the Mistaken
- Notable awards: 21st Dengeki Comics Grand Prize, Gold (2014)
- Website: Official website

Nio Nakatani (Japanese: 仲谷鳰, Hepburn: Nakatani Nio) is a Japanese manga artist. She is best known for creating the yuri manga series Bloom Into You, which has been a commercial success and spawned a media franchise encompassing an anime, light novels, a stage play, and an anthology manga spinoff. Nakatani is also known as a creator of doujinshi works, particularly those based on the Touhou Project series. Her current work is My Beloved Apocalypse, which is being serialized in Dengeki Daioh.

Nakatani is a native of Shiga Prefecture. She is a graduate of Kyoto Seika University.

== Early life ==
Nio Nakatani first began drawing in her elementary school years, though she described her early drawings as derivative of existing works. In an interview, she stated that she had performed in a concert band as a student, playing the trombone and tuba while in middle and high school, respectively.

== Career ==
Nakatani's first complete project was produced around the time of her high school graduation, after which she continued drawing until her art met a professional standard. She submitted some of her work to art exhibitions, but found being a "proper" artist boring. After recalling her childhood memories of being told she could draw manga when she got older, she decided to pursue it seriously. According to Nakatani, she found it funny that it "took 20 years for me to believe it".

Nakatani became known as a manga artist through her work on doujinshi, especially those based on the Touhou Project series, which she published under the pseudonym "Rireba" (リレバ). (Note: A contraction of リレイション・バレイ, the katakana spelling of "Relation Valley," a literal English translation of "Nakatani".) Nakatani's professional pen name, Nio, is the Japanese term for little grebe, which is the official bird of her home prefecture of Shiga. As the little grebe is known as a long-lived bird in Shiga, she stated that she hopes it will grant her a "long and successful career." However, Nakatani admitted that in reality, she came up with "Nio" by scrambling her real name, and the relation to the bird was a coincidence.

According to Nakatani, she became first interested in drawing manga about girls when reading Yun Kōga's manga Loveless, "which has no girls in it" and led her to realize "I might like stories about girls." In 2014, Nakatani submitted her one-shot work Farewell to My Alter, which she had previously self-published, to the Dengeki Daioh magazine. Farewell to My Alter appeared in the magazine in October 2014 as Nakatani's professional debut, winning her a Gold award in the 21st Dengeki Comics Grand Prize contest. Nakatani created one additional one-shot work for the magazine, Tear-Flavored Escargot, which appeared in the December 2014 issue prior to her first serialization.

Because her works were primarily about relationships between girls (a fact which Nakatani attributed to the Touhou series' almost entirely female cast), she gained a reputation as an author of yuri manga. This surprised Nakatani, as she had not intentionally set out to write yuri nor considered her works as such, saying that her primary interest was to depict complex human relationships that interested her. However, as she nonetheless was interested in the yuri genre, she became interested in drawing an unambiguous love story between girls. When Tatsuya Kusunoki, an editor of the manga magazine Dengeki Daioh (in which she had professionally debuted with their publication of her previously self-published short story Farewell to My Alter) approached her at a doujinshi convention to ask if she wanted to draw a yuri series for the magazine, Nakatani accepted the offer, and went onto create Bloom Into You for the magazine.

Bloom Into You began its serialization in Dengeki Daioh on April 27, 2015 and concluded on September 27, 2019, after a 45-chapter run. The series had over 1,000,000 copies in print in Japan as of 2019, and placed 4th in the 2017 Next Manga Awards from Niconico and Da Vinci. It has been adapted into an anime series and a stage play, and received spinoffs in the form of light novels and anthology comics.

After the completion of Bloom Into You, Nakatani expressed that she wanted her next work to be of a genre other than yuri, as she felt she had already written the yuri story she wished to write. However, she said that she would likely revisit the yuri genre in the future. Nakatani's next work, Kami-sama ga Machigaeru, was announced in Dengeki Daioh on September 26, 2021, and began serialization on October 27, 2021, concluding on November 29, 2023, after 22 chapters. It was simultaneously published digitally in English by Yen Press under the title God Bless the Mistaken. On September 27, 2025, Nakatani's current work, Kimi wa Shuumatsu, began serialization in Dengeki Daioh.

Nakatani has collaborated as an illustrator with light novel writer and Adachi and Shimamura author Hitoma Iruma, first on the Bloom Into You light novel spinoff series Regarding Saeki Sayaka, as well as his original novels End Blue and Shoujo Mousou Chuu.

== Works ==
=== Published manga ===
- Riddle Story of Devil (assistant to Sunao Minakata)
- Farewell to My Alter (さよならオルタ) (Note: Initially self-published as doujinshi, republished as one-shot in Dengeki Daioh as Nakatani's professional debut, and later collected in short story compilation of the same name)
- Tear-Flavored Escargot (Note: Later republished in Nio Nakatani Short Story Collection)
- Bloom Into You (やがて君になる)
- God Bless the Mistaken (神さまがまちガえる)
- My Beloved Apocalypse (きみは終末)

=== Light novels ===
- Bloom Into You: Regarding Saeki Sayaka (やがて君になる 佐伯沙弥香について) (as illustrator; writer: Hitoma Iruma)
- Shoujo Mousou Chuu (少女妄想中) (as illustrator; writer: Hitoma Iruma)
- End Blue (エンドブルー) (as illustrator; writer: Hitoma Iruma)

=== Anthologies/compilations ===
- Éclair: A Girls' Love Anthology That Resonates in Your Heart (エクレア あなたに響く百合アンソロジー) (Note: Contributed chapter "Happiness in the Shape of a Scar")
- Éclair Blanche (エクレア blanche)
- Éclair Bleue (エクレア bleue)
- Éclair Rouge (エクレアrouge) (Note: Contributed chapter "I Am Custom-Made")
- Éclair Orange (エクレア orange)
- Bloom Into You Anthology (やがて君になる 公式コミックアンソロジー) (Note: Original creator, contributed chapter to volume 2)
- Farewell to my Alter: Nio Nakatani Short Story Collection (さよならオルタ) (Note: Collection of previously published one-shot works)

=== Art books ===
- Bloom Into You Illustration Works ASTROLABE (やがて君になる画集 アストロラーベ)

=== Doujinshi works ===
Self-published under the pen name "Rireba" (リレバ).

- Silver Fire (銀の火, Gin no Hi)
- Mimesis Dolls
- Fantasy Melt (幻想メルト, Gensō Meruto)
- Tsukinaki (月哭)
- And to Call Your Name (そして名前を呼ぶために, Soshite Namae o Yobu Tame Ni)
- Luminous Butterfly (ルミナスバタフライ)
- Spectral Feelings -Invisible Violet- (スペクトルのきもち, Supekutoru no Ki Mochi)
- The Focal Length is Nine Feet (焦点は求フィート, Shouten wa Motome Photo)
- unfair randomizer (アンフェア ランダマイザ)
- Cat's House (ねこのいえ, Neko no Ie)
- Relation Valley 1 (リレイション・バレイ1 リレバ総集編, Rireishon Barei 1 Rireba Sōshūhen) (Note: Compilation of previous Touhou doujinshi works, includes new work "Relation Valley")
- Research on a Certain Flower (或る花の研究, Aru Hana no Kenkyū)
- BLOODBERRY TRAP
- Farewell to My Alter (さよならオルタ)
- The Hero Saves the World Three Times (勇者は三回世界を救う, Yūsha wa San-kai Sekai o Sukuu)
- Wandering Yu-Kyoto (ワンダリング酉京都)
- The Bittersweet Blue (青の甘さは忘れない, Ao no Ama-sa wa Wasurenai)
- Soft Enclosure (やわらかなかご, Yawaraka na Kago)
- Imaginary Anata (イマジナリーあなた, Imajinarī Anata)
- Nagi o Matsu -ue- (凪を俟つ -上-)
- Guardian of Scars (きずあとの番人, Kizuato no Bannin)
- Relation Valley 2 (リレイション・バレイ2 リレバ総集編, Rireishon Barei 2 Rireba Sōshūhen) (Note: Compilation of previous doujinshi works)
- The Idol Diagonally Opposite Me (ななめまえの偶像, Nanamemae no Idol)
- Q's Copyist (Qの模倣子, Q no Mohō-ko)
- Kyōzō no M (鏡像のM)
