= Farewell to My Alter =

Japanese manga series

- Farewell to My Alter: Nakatani Nio Short Story Collection
- Tankōbon volume cover

さよならオルタ (Sayonara Alter)
- Genre: Drama; Romance; Yuri
- Manga
- Written by: Nio Nakatani
- Published by: ASCII Media Works
- English publisher: NA: Yen Press
- Magazine: Dengeki Daioh
- Original run: 2014 – 2019
- Volumes: 1

Farewell to My Alter: Nakatani Nio Short Story Collection (Japanese: さよならオルタ, Hepburn: Sayonara Alter) is a Japanese manga anthology written and illustrated by Nio Nakatani. It was first published as individual one-shots in Dengeki Daioh and the Éclair anthology series, before being collected into a single tankōbon volume by Kadokawa Shoten in 2020. It was licensed in English by Yen Press.

== Publication ==
Written and illustrated by Nio Nakatani, Farewell to My Alter collects several of Nakatani's one-shots that were published in Dengeki Daioh and the yuri anthology series Éclair from 2014 to 2019, before being collected into a single tankōbon volume by Kadokawa Shoten in 2020. The story the collection is named after was initially self-published as doujinshi, before later being republished as a one-shot in Dengeki Daioh as Nakatani's professional debut.

The series was licensed for an English release in North America by Yen Press in 2021.

| No. | Original release date | Original ISBN | English release date | English ISBN |
|---|---|---|---|---|
| 1 | February 25, 2020 | 978-4049130270 | June 29, 2021 | 9781975321253 |
1. "Farewell to My Alter"; 2. "The Hero Saves The Word Three Times"; 3. "Tear-Flavored Escargot"; 4. "Happiness in the Shape of a Scar"; 5. "Always in Profile"; 6. "Comm-ear-ication"; 7. "Double Bed"; 8. "I Want To Be Kind"

== Reception ==
Rebecca Silverman of Anime News Network gave Farewell to My Alter an overall A− rating, noting that the chronological publication order of the works makes for an interesting survey of Nakatani's evolution as a creator, as well as praising the characterization throughout; "Even in the standard RPG-inspired fantasy piece and the magic realism story about literally eating your feelings, there's a real sense of characters who are struggling with who and what they are and how they feel about that."

Erica Friedman of Yuricon also noted the interest in seeing Nakatani's work change over time in her recommendation, "If you're a huge fan of her work, or you like short manga stories with slightly uncomfortable edges, you'll want to get this collection. It definitely is an excellent overview of her art changing over the last decade or so. changes, as it evolves quite considerably from beginning to end in a way that would not be obvious if you didn't see the stories laid out one after the other."
