= Kimi wa Shūmatsu =

Japanese manga series

- First tankōbon volume cover

きみは終末
- Genre: Apocalyptic; Romantic comedy
- Manga
- Written by: Nio Nakatani
- Published by: ASCII Media Works
- Imprint: Dengeki Comics NEXT
- Magazine: Dengeki Daioh
- Original run: September 27, 2025 – present
- Volumes: 2

Kimi wa Shūmatsu (Japanese: きみは終末; lit. 'You Are the End of the World'), also known as My Beloved Apocalypse, is a Japanese manga series written and illustrated by Nio Nakatani. It began serialization in ASCII Media Works's Dengeki Daioh magazine in September 2025, and has been compiled into two volumes as of August 2026.

== Plot ==
Yutaka Kuromori and Aru Hoshino are two classmates in a close relationship, despite not officially dating. Six years prior, cracks that had formed in the sky several years before broke into holds, leading to chaos disrupting the world and causing several deaths. Since that day, known as the "Outbreak", voids from another One day, a mysterious group kidnaps Aru, claiming that she is connected to that event and that they are trying to save the world from further destruction. After subduing her captors, Aru reveals herself to be an alien anomaly that caused the outbreak in the first place. She shows her true form whenever she is in a bad mood, leading to Yutaka working to make her happy to prevent her powers' consequences.

== Characters ==
Yutaka Kuromori (黒森 由崇, Kuromori Yutaka)
A 16-year-old high school student and Aru's classmate. Despite their close relationship, they do not see each other as lovers, although they enjoy each other's company. He has been thinking of taking up bodyguard training to protect Aru, vowing to keep her in a good mood to prevent the world from ending.
Aru Hoshina (星名 或, Hoshina Aru)
Yutaka's classmate and friend, who is popular and has a cheerful personality. Although they are not officially dating, the two have a close relationship. She is an alien anomaly and the original source of the "Outbreak", with her powers manifesting whenever she is a bad mood. When this happens, she becomes even more attached to Yutaka.

== Development ==
Nio Nakatani began developing the series to contrast with her previous manga God Bless the Mistaken, with that series featuring a more gentle world, as opposed to Kimi wa Shūmatsu's more chaotic one. The idea was inspired by Makoto Shinkai's film Weathering with You, with Nakatani wanting to create a boy-meets-girl story where the girl could cause consequences, such as the end of the world. Although the final manga ended up being a romantic story, she originally planned it to be a more action-focused series; however, she abandoned the idea as she felt that the concept did not work out. Yutaka and Aru's relationship was originally intended to be more friendly rather than romantic, with her editor suggesting the change to the focus on romance.

== Publication ==
The series is written and illustrated by Nio Nakatani, who previously serialized the manga Bloom Into You in ASCII Media Works's Dengeki Daioh magazine from 2015 to 2019. It began serialization in Dengeki Daioh on September 27, 2025. The first tankōbon volume was released on February 27, 2026; two volumes have been released as of August 27, 2026.

No.	Release date	ISBN
1	February 27, 2026	978-4-04-916982-9
2	August 27, 2026	978-4-04-952393-5

== Reception ==
The series was nominated for the 2026 Next Manga Award in the print category.
