= Iruma =

Iruma (入間) may refer to:

== Places ==
- Iruma, Saitama, a city in Japan
- Iruma District, Saitama, a district in Japan
- Iruma River
- Iruma Air Base

== Peoples ==
- Hitoma Iruma (入間 人間), a Japanese writer and light novel author

== Characters ==
- Iruma Suzuki (鈴木 入間), protagonist in the manga and anime Welcome to Demon School! Iruma-kun
- Miu Iruma (入間 美兎), a character from the Danganronpa video game and anime series
