= Hitozuma Kyōshi ga Oshiego no Joshi Kōkōsei ni Do-hamari Suru Hanashi =

Japanese light novel series

- First light novel volume cover

人妻教師が教え子の女子高生にドはまりする話
- Genre: Yuri
- Novel series
- Written by: Hitoma Iruma
- Published by: Kakuyomu
- Original run: March 13, 2024 – November 14, 2025
- Light novel
- Written by: Hitoma Iruma
- Illustrated by: Pushio Nekoyashiki
- Published by: ASCII Media Works
- Imprint: Dengeki Bunko
- Original run: September 10, 2024 – September 10, 2025
- Volumes: 3
- Manga
- Written by: Hitoma Iruma
- Illustrated by: Shion Kawakami
- Published by: ASCII Media Works
- Imprint: Dengeki Comics NEXT
- Magazine: Comic Dengeki Daioh "g"
- Original run: August 27, 2025 – present
- Volumes: 1

Hitozuma Kyōshi ga Oshiego no Joshi Kōkōsei ni Do-hamari Suru Hanashi (人妻教師が教え子の女子高生にドはまりする話; "The Story of a Married High School Teacher Becoming Obsessed With Her Female Student") is a Japanese light novel series written by Hitoma Iruma and illustrated by Pushio Nekoyashiki. It was originally posted as a web novel on Kadokawa's online publication platform Kakuyomu from March 2024 to November 2025, before being published under ASCII Media Works' Dengeki Bunko imprint. Three volumes were published between September 2024 and September 2025. A manga adaptation illustrated by Shion Kawakami began serialization in ASCII Media Works' Comic Dengeki Daioh "g" magazine in August 2025 and has been compiled into a single tankōbon volume as of February 2026.

== Plot ==
Itsuki Ichigohara, a high school teacher, finds herself becoming close to Rin Togawa, one of her students. Rin, who has a cheerful personality, has become attached to Itsuki. Learning that Rin has complicated family issues, Itsuki tries to help Rin. As she gets closer to Rin, Itsuki feels conflicted about her relationship with her, and how she can deal with her roles as a married woman and as Rin's teacher.

== Characters ==
Itsuki Ichigohara (苺原 樹, Ichigohara Itsuki)
Rin's homeroom teacher. She is called Ichigo-sensei by Rin, a shortening of her family name. Although she has been married for four years, she does not share a room with her husband. She later starts an affair with Rin after the two become close.
Rin Togawa (戸川 凛, Togawa Rin)
A cheerful high school student who belongs to Itsuki's class. Her father died when she was young, while her mother started a relationship with a woman some time after.
Takasora Hoshi (星高 空, Hoshi Takasora)
Rin's friend. When Itsuki first encounters her, Takasora introduces herself as Rin's older sister, although Itsuki quickly sees through this.

== Media ==
=== Light novel ===
The series is written by Hitoma Iruma, who originally began posting it as a web novel on Kadokawa's online publication platform Kakuyomu on March 13, 2024, with the last chapter, an epilogue, being posted on November 14, 2025. It was later picked up for publication by ASCII Media Works, which published it under its Dengeki Bunko imprint. Three volumes were published between September 10, 2024, and September 10, 2025.

No.	Release date	ISBN
1	September 10, 2024	978-4-04-915806-9
2	January 10, 2025	978-4-04-916091-8
3	September 10, 2025	978-4-04-916535-7

=== Manga ===
A manga adaptation illustrated by Shion Kawakami began serialization in ASCII Media Works' Comic Dengeki Daioh "g" magazine on August 27, 2025. The first tankōbon volume was released on February 27, 2026.

No.	Japanese release date	Japanese ISBN
1	February 27, 2026	978-4-04-916997-3
