= Adachi and Shimamura =

Japanese light novel series and its franchise

- First light novel volume cover, featuring Hougetsu Shimamura (left) and Sakura Adachi (right)

安達としまむら (Adachi to Shimamura)
- Genre: Romance; Yuri
- Light novel
- Written by: Hitoma Iruma
- Illustrated by: Non (volumes 1–8); Shizue Kaneko (volume 9); Raemz (volume 10–12)
- Published by: ASCII Media Works
- English publisher: NA: Seven Seas Entertainment
- Imprint: Dengeki Bunko
- Magazine: Dengeki Bunko Magazine
- Original run: October 2012 (serialization); March 2013 (publication) – present
- Volumes: 13
- Manga
- Written by: Hitoma Iruma
- Illustrated by: Mani
- Published by: Square Enix
- Magazine: Gangan Online
- Original run: April 4, 2016 – December 22, 2017
- Volumes: 3
- Manga
- Written by: Hitoma Iruma
- Illustrated by: Moke Yuzuhara
- Published by: ASCII Media Works
- English publisher: NA: Yen Press
- Magazine: Dengeki Daioh
- Original run: May 25, 2019 – present
- Volumes: 9
- Anime television series
- Directed by: Satoshi Kuwabara
- Produced by: Junichirou Tanaka; Atsushi Yoshikawa; Tomoyuki Oowada; Takaaki Nakanome; Hiroshi Anami; Rina Nakazawa
- Written by: Keiichirou Oochi
- Music by: Natsumi Tabuchi; Hanae Nakamura; Miki Sakurai
- Studio: Tezuka Productions
- Licensed by: Crunchyroll
- Original network: TBS, BS11
- Original run: October 9, 2020 – December 25, 2020
- Episodes: 12
- icon

Adachi and Shimamura (Japanese: 安達としまむら, Hepburn: Adachi to Shimamura) is a Japanese yuri light novel series written by Hitoma Iruma and illustrated by Non. The series began serialization in October 2012 in ASCII Media Works' Dengeki Bunko Magazine, with thirteen volumes and several spin-off works subsequently published under its Dengeki Bunko imprint. The story follows Sakura Adachi and Hougetsu Shimamura, two first-year high school students, as Adachi tries to express her romantic feelings for Shimamura, who treats Adachi as merely a friend.

A manga adaptation with art by Mani was serialized from April 2016 to December 2017, while a second manga adaptation with art by Moke Yuzuhara was serialized starting May 2019 in Dengeki Daioh. The light novels and the second manga adaptation are published in North America by Seven Seas Entertainment and Yen Press respectively.

An anime television series adaptation by Tezuka Productions aired from October to December 2020.

== Plot ==
First-year high school students Sakura Adachi and Hougetsu Shimamura encounter each other one day while skipping class and become friends. Adachi gradually develops romantic feelings for Shimamura, which she struggles to express, while Shimamura feels like Adachi is merely a friend to her. The series follows their relationship and their emerging romance as Adachi gathers the courage to open up to Shimamura.

== Characters ==
Sakura Adachi (安達 桜, Adachi Sakura)
Voiced by: Akari Kitō (Japanese); Megan Shipman (English)
A first-year high school student who often skips classes. She is a beautiful girl with a slender figure and black hair, and works part-time at a Chinese restaurant. Adachi is a deeply introverted individual who generally eschews relationships with others, as she finds them to be a significant burden. This changes when she happens to meet Shimamura, who also skips classes. She has romantic feelings for Shimamura, and is intensely jealous towards other girls who interact with her.
During summer break in their second year of high school, Adachi confesses her feelings to Shimamura at a festival, and becomes her girlfriend.
Hougetsu Shimamura (島村 抱月, Shimamura Hougetsu)
Voiced by: Miku Itō (Japanese); Amanda Lee (English)
A first-year high school student who tends to skip classes, though not as much as Adachi. She has light brown colored hair and an innocent personality. Although she dislikes socializing, she has a talent for taking care of others.
During summer break in their second year of high school, Shimamura is confessed to by Adachi at a festival, and chooses to accept her feelings, thus becoming her girlfriend.
Akira Hino (日野 晶, Hino Akira)
Voiced by: Manami Numakura (Japanese); Sarah Anne Williams (English)
The youngest daughter of a wealthy family with four older brothers. She is short, has black hair, and behaves frivolously. She is not used to the refined atmosphere at home, often staying at Nagafuji's house. She became friends with Shimamura in high school.
Taeko Nagafuji (永藤 妙子, Nagafuji Taeko)
Voiced by: Reina Ueda (Japanese); Monica Rial (English)
A high school girl as tall as Shimamura with large breasts and glasses. Her recent worry is being stared at by boys. She is a little careless and always teased by Hino. She has been friends with Hino since kindergarten.
Yashiro Chikama (知我麻 社, Chikama Yashiro)
Voiced by: Iori Saeki (Japanese); Sarah Wiedenheft (English)
A self-proclaimed alien from the future who came to Earth in search of her lost compatriot from space. She looks like an elementary school girl, but claims to be around 670 years old. She likes Shimamura and often plays with Shimamura's younger sister at home. She usually wanders around the town. Yashiro demonstrates telepathic abilities, and is described in a flash-forward sequence set ten years after the main events of the series as having never physically aged.
In the special novel stories included with the Japanese Blu-ray release of the anime, Yashiro is depicted thousands of years after the events of the series, still not having aged. She encounters reincarnations of Adachi and Shimamura (called Chito and Shima) on a post-apocalyptic planet that has been colonized by a since-degraded future human civilization, and it is revealed that she has committed herself to ensure that every version of Adachi and Shimamura continue to meet each other, having promised this to Shimamura in the past.
Tarumi (樽見)
Voiced by: Ai Kayano (Japanese); Alexis Tipton (English)
Shimamura's best friend in elementary school. She and Shimamura called each other "Shima-chan" and "Taru-chan", but became distant as a result of attending different junior high schools. The two happen to meet again in the winter of their first year of high school with the hope of restarting their friendship. She has a reputation as a delinquent because she often skipped school and wandered around in junior high. Tarumi's efforts to reignite her friendship with Shimamura upset Adachi, igniting extreme feelings of jealousy when she sees them together.

== Media ==
=== Light novels ===
The original light novel series, written by Hitoma Iruma and illustrated by Non, was first serialized in ASCII Media Works' Dengeki Bunko Magazine in October 2012. ASCII Media Works began publishing the series under its Dengeki Bunko imprint on March 10, 2013. ASCII Media Works has published thirteen volumes as of December 25. It was initially announced that the twelfth volume would be the final installment of the series, but in April 2024, Iruma stated in a blog post that he planned to continue it further. Seven Seas Entertainment have licensed the light novels for release in North America.

No.	Original release date	Original ISBN	English release date	English ISBN
1	March 10, 2013	978-4-04-891421-5	April 16, 2020 (digital); July 14, 2020 (physical)	978-1-64505-535-8
2	September 10, 2013	978-4-04-891960-9	May 28, 2020 (digital); September 8, 2020 (physical)	978-1-64505-539-6
3	August 9, 2014	978-4-04-866777-7	August 27, 2020 (digital); November 24, 2020 (physical)	978-1-64505-771-0
4	May 9, 2015	978-4-04-865115-8	November 26, 2020 (digital); February 9, 2021 (physical)	978-1-64505-720-8
5	November 10, 2015	978-4-04-865505-7	May 13, 2021 (digital); June 1, 2021 (physical)	978-1-64827-200-4
6	May 10, 2016	978-4-04-865946-8	July 22, 2021 (digital); August 17, 2021 (physical)	978-1-64827-262-2
7	November 10, 2016	978-4-04-892517-4	October 21, 2021 (digital); November 16, 2021 (physical)	978-1-64827-365-0
8	May 10, 2019	978-4-04-912383-8	January 13, 2022 (digital); February 15, 2022 (physical)	978-1-64827-276-9
9	October 10, 2020	978-4-04-913128-4	May 19, 2022 (digital); June 28, 2022 (physical)	978-1-63858-312-7
10	September 10, 2021	978-4-04-913998-3	December 22, 2022 (digital); January 17, 2023 (physical)	978-1-63858-698-2
11	December 9, 2022	978-4-04-914689-9	October 5, 2023 (digital); November 14, 2023 (physical)	978-1-63858-958-7
SS	November 10, 2023	978-4-04-915346-0	January 2, 2025 (digital); February 11, 2025 (physical)	979-8-89373-129-3
99.9	November 10, 2023	978-4-04-915347-7	May 1, 2025 (digital); June 3, 2025 (physical)	979-8-89373-128-6
12	November 8, 2024	978-4-04-915981-3	September 11, 2025 (digital); October 7, 2025 (physical)	979-8-88843-100-9
SS2	November 8, 2024	978-4-04-915982-0	January 1, 2026 (digital); February 3, 2026 (physical)	979-8-89561-202-6
13	November 8, 2025	978-4-04-916758-0	September 17, 2026 (digital); October 20, 2026 (physical)	979-8-89863-165-9
SS3	September 10, 2026	978-4-04-952366-9	—	—

=== Manga ===
A manga adaptation illustrated by Mani was serialized online via Square Enix's Gangan Online website from April 4, 2016, to December 22, 2017. It was collected in three tankōbon volumes. A second manga adaptation with illustrations by Moke Yuzuhara began serialization in ASCII Media Works' shōnen manga magazine Dengeki Daioh on May 25, 2019. It has been collected in nine tankōbon volumes. The second manga adaptation is licensed in North America by Yen Press.

==== 2016 series ====
No.	Release date	ISBN
1	December 22, 2016	978-4-7575-5188-6
2	June 9, 2017	978-4-7575-5346-0
3	December 22, 2017	978-4-7575-5523-5

==== 2019 series ====
No.	Original release date	Original ISBN	English release date	English ISBN
1	November 27, 2019	978-4-04-912870-3	February 23, 2021	978-1-9753-2003-4
2	October 10, 2020	978-4-04-913482-7	October 5, 2021	978-1-9753-3617-2
3	May 27, 2021	978-4-04-913811-5	June 7, 2022	978-1-9753-4282-1
4	February 26, 2022	978-4-04-914265-5	October 18, 2022	978-1-9753-5176-2
5	June 27, 2023	978-4-04-915103-9	June 18, 2024	978-1-9753-9444-8
6	July 26, 2024	978-4-04-915842-7	November 25, 2025	979-8-8554-1899-6
7	June 27, 2025	978-4-04-916450-3	July 28, 2026	979-8-8554-3393-7
8	April 10, 2026	978-4-04-952160-3	—	—
9	October 27, 2026	978-4-04-952504-5	—	—

=== Anime ===
An anime television series adaptation was announced on May 6, 2019. The series is animated by Tezuka Productions and directed by Satoshi Kuwabara, with Keiichirō Ōchi handling the series composition, and Shizue Kaneko designing the characters. Natsumi Tabuchi, Hanae Nakamura, and Miki Sakurai composed the music. The opening theme is "Kimi ni Aeta Hi" (君に会えた日) performed by Akari Kitō and Miku Itō as their respective characters, while the ending theme is "Kimi no Tonari de" (キミのとなりで) performed by Kitō. It aired from October 9 to December 25, 2020, on TBS and BS11. The series ran for 12 episodes.

Funimation acquired the series and streamed it on its website in North America and the British Isles, and on AnimeLab in Australia and New Zealand. On February 17, 2021, Funimation announced the series would be receiving an English dub, with the first episode premiering the next day. Following Sony's acquisition of Crunchyroll, the series was moved to Crunchyroll.

No.	Title (Note: All English titles are taken from Funimation.)	Directed by	Written by	Original release date (Note: TBS listed the series premiere at 25:58 on October 8, 2020, which is October 9 at 1:58 a.m.)
1	"Playing Ping-Pong in Our Uniforms"; Transliteration: "Seifuku Pinpon" (Japanese: 制服ピンポン)	Fumihiro Yoshimura	Keiichirō Ōchi	October 9, 2020
While skipping class one day, first year student Hougetsu Shimamura encounters a classmate, Sakura Adachi, who has also skipped class and spends her time alone on the second floor of the gym. After becoming acquainted, the two routinely continue to meet and play ping-pong together. Later, Shimamura goes fishing with her friend, Akira Hino, and meets a strange person wearing a space suit.
2	"Adachi Question"; Transliteration: "Adachi Kuesuchon" (Japanese: 安達クエスチョン)	Yasuo Iwamoto	Keiichirō Ōchi	October 16, 2020
Shimamura is invited by Hino to go fishing because she wants her to meet an interesting person. At the fishing spot, Shimamura meets Yashiro, a girl wearing a space suit and claims that she comes from the future. The next day, Shimamura tells Adachi about the encounter but she shows no interest in it. Shimamura suggests Adachi to attend class in the afternoon and she accepts while Adachi also invites Shimamura to hang out together after school. While hanging out, they encounter Yashiro. Seeing Shimamura on friendly terms with Yashiro, Adachi leaves. She begins to question herself on how she actually feels about Shimamura. Later, Adachi goes to Shimamura's house and sits between her legs. Starting to realize her feelings, she brings her face closer to Shimamura's but comes back to her senses and runs off.
3	"Isosceles Triangle"; Transliteration: "Nitōhen Toraianguru" (Japanese: 二等辺トライアングル)	Takuo Suzuki	Keiichirō Ōchi	October 23, 2020
4	"High School Girls On Holiday"; Transliteration: "Joshikōsei Horidi" (Japanese: 女子高生ホリディ)	Taiji Kawanishi	Mayumi Morita	October 30, 2020
5	"Adachi's Question"; Transliteration: "Adachizu Q" (Japanese: アダチズQ)	Kaoru Yabana	Mayumi Morita	November 6, 2020
6	"White Album"; Transliteration: "Howaito Arubamu" (Japanese: ホワイト・アルバム)	Ryūta Yamamoto	Keiichirō Ōchi	November 13, 2020
7	"Please Choose the Best Chocolate for Me"; Transliteration: "Watashi ni Fusawashii Choko o Kimete Kudasai" (Japanese: 私に相応しいチョコを決めてください)	Tomio Yamauchi	Keiichirō Ōchi	November 20, 2020
8	"The Briar That Weaves the Past: Old Rose"; Transliteration: "Kako o Tsumugu Ibara Ōrudo Rōzu" (Japanese: 過去を紡ぐ茨 オールドローズ)	Fumihiro Yoshimura	Mayumi Morita	November 27, 2020
9	"Love That Embraces the Holy Mother: Marigold"; Transliteration: "Soshite Seibo o Hōyō Suru Ai Marīgōrudo" (Japanese: そして聖母を抱擁する愛 マリーゴールド)	Ryūta Yamamoto	Keiichirō Ōchi	December 4, 2020
10	"Cherry Blossoms and Spring and Spring and the Moon"; Transliteration: "Sakura to Haru to Haru to Tsuki to" (Japanese: 桜と春と 春と月と)	Fumio Maezono	Keiichirō Ōchi	December 11, 2020
11	"The Moon and Determination, Determination and Friends"; Transliteration: "Tsuki to Ketsui to Ketsui to Tomo to" (Japanese: 月と決意と 決意と友と)	Masami Hata	Mayumi Morita	December 18, 2020
12	"Friends and Love, Love and Cherry Blossoms"; Transliteration: "Tomo to Ai to Ai to Sakura to" (Japanese: 友と愛と 愛と桜と)	Fumihiro Yoshimura	Keiichirō Ōchi	December 25, 2020

== Reception ==
Joe Ballard of CBR reviewed the anime series throughout its run. In early reviews, Ballard said that it is similar to Bloom Into You and called it "a heartwarming coming-of-age story" while noting the "growing friendship" between Adachi and Shimamura, as their relationship expands, and their bond strengthens. In later reviews, he said that the series focuses mainly on "two girls getting to know each other" as they learn more about each other along the way and their romance blossoms. In his review of the final episode, Ballard said that the story is "slowly blossoming into a love story" and added that end of the episode is symbolic, as Adachi and Shimamura are not sitting next to each other, "but they're a little closer than they were before." In January 2021, Constance Sarantos of CBR said that the series shares similar storyboarding moments which emphasize "intimate moments and loneliness" with the series Otherside Picnic. The same month, Ballard penned another review of the series, saying that the first season "concluded with more questions than answers," and hoped that a second season would bring "more concrete answers." The same month, Angelo Delos Trinos of CBR called the series a "heartwarming Shoujo Ai (i.e. Girls' Love) anime" which legitimizes the yuri genre, saying that it is unfortunate that not many people talk about it or "Yuri romances in general."

A review of the first volume in Publishers Weekly called the series "oddly voyeuristic" and felt it was "inexplicably" being marketed to an adult audience. The review further criticized the characters as "flimsy adult fantasies" with no complexity, and concluded by saying that it may have appeal with a teenaged audience but would not interest older readers.

The School Library Journal listed the first volume of the Adachi and Shimamura (2019 manga) as one of the top 10 manga of 2021.
