= Hitoma Iruma =

Japanese light novel author

- Born: 1986 (age 39–40); Gifu Prefecture, Japan
- Occupation: Light novel author
- Writing career
- Language: Japanese
- Genres: Slice of life; Comedy; Yuri
- Notable works: Ground Control to Psychoelectric Girl; Adachi and Shimamura; Bloom Into You: Regarding Saeki Sayaka

Hitoma Iruma (入間 人間, Iruma Hitoma; born 1986) is a Japanese writer and light novel author, best known for creating Ground Control to Psychoelectric Girl and the yuri series Adachi and Shimamura, both of which have received anime and manga adaptations. He is also known for having written Regarding Saeki Sayaka, a light novel spinoff series of Nio Nakatani's manga Bloom Into You. He was born in Gifu Prefecture.

== Works ==
=== Dengeki Bunko ===
- Usotsuki Mii-kun to Kowareta Maa-chan (嘘つきみーくんと壊れたまーちゃん) (June 2007 - June 2017, 12 volumes. Illustrator: Hidari)
- Ground Control to Psychoelectric Girl (電波女と青春男) (January 2009 - April 2011, 9 volumes. Illustrator: Buriki)
- Tamako-san to Kashiwa-kun (多摩湖さんと黄鶏くん) (July 2010. Illustrator: Hidari)
- Tokage no Ō (トカゲの王; "The Lizard King") (July 2011 - July 2013, 5 volumes. Illustrator: Buriki)
- Crocro-Clock (クロクロクロック) (August 2012 - January 2016, 3 volumes. Illustrator: Misaki Kurehito)
- Adachi and Shimamura (安達としまむら) (March 2013 - Present, 13 volumes. Illustrator: Non, raemz)
- Tsuyokunai Mama New Game (強くないままニューゲーム) (May 2013 - October 2013, 2 volumes. Illustrator: Ueda Ryō)
- Fuwafuwa-san ga Furu (ふわふわさんがふる) (April 2014. Illustrator: loundraw)
- Nijiiro Alien (虹色エイリアン) (November 2014. Illustrator: Hidari)
- Otomodachi Robo Choco (おともだちロボ チョコ) (April 2015. Illustrator: loundraw)
- Bishōjo wa, Kiru Koto to Mitsuketari (美少女とは、斬る事と見つけたり) (August 2015. Illustrator: Coffee Kizoku)
- Imōto Life (いもーとらいふ) (July 2016 - September 2016, 2 volumes. Illustrator: Fly)
- Sekai no Owari no Niwa de (世界の終わりの庭で) (September 2018. Illustrator: Tsukuzu)
- Bloom Into You: Regarding Saeki Sayaka (やがて君になる 佐伯沙弥香について) (November 2018 - March 2020, 3 volumes. Illustrator: Nio Nakatani)
- Umi no Kanaria (海のカナリア) (September 2019. Illustrator: Tsukuzu)
- End Blue (エンドブルー) (December 2020. Illustrator: Nio Nakatani)
- My First Love's Kiss (私の初恋相手がキスしてた) (January 2022 - December 2022, 3 volumes. Illustrator: Fly)
- Hitozuma Kyōshi ga Oshiego no Joshi Kōkōsei ni Do-hamari Suru Hanashi (人妻教師が教え子の女子高生にドはまりする話) (September 2024. Illustrator: Nekoyashiki Pushio)

=== ASCII Media Works Tankōbon ===
- Boku no Shōkibo na Kiseki (僕の小規模な奇跡) (October 2009)
- Bocchies (ぼっちーズ) (November 2011. Illustrator: Atsuya Uki)
- Shūmatsu ga Yatte Kuru! -La La La Shūmatsuron. I- (しゅうまつがやってくる！ ―ラララ終末論。I―) (December 2015. Story: sasakure.UK, illustrator: usi)
- Bokura no 16bit Sensō -La La La Shūmatsuron. II- (ぼくらの16bit戦争 ―ラララ終末論。II―) (October 2016. Story: sasakure.UK, illustrator: usi)

=== Media Works Bunko ===
- Tantei Hanasaki Tarō wa Hiramekanai (探偵・花咲太郎は閃かない) (December 2009. Illustrator: Hidari)
- Tantei Hanasaki Tarō wa Kutsugaesanai (探偵・花咲太郎は覆さない) (February 2010. Illustrator: Hidari)
- 660 Yen no Kijō (六百六十円の事情) (May 2010. Illustrator: Atsuya Uki)
- Baka ga Zenra de Yattekuru (バカが全裸でやってくる) (August 2010)
- Boku no Shōkibo na Kiseki (僕の小規模な奇跡) (May 2011. Illustrator: Atsuya Uki)
- Baka ga Zenra de Yattekuru Ver.2.0 (バカが全裸でやってくるVer.2.0) (September 2011)
- Kinō wa Kanojo mo Koi Shiteta (昨日は彼女も恋してた) (November 2011. Illustrator: Hidari)
- Ashita mo Kanojo wa Koi o suru (明日も彼女は恋をする) (December 2011. Illustrator: Hidari)
- Jikan no Otoshimono (時間のおとしもの) (January 2012. Illustrator: Niwa)
- Kanojo o Sukininaru 12 no hōhō (彼女を好きになる12の方法) (August 2012. Illustrator: Atsuya Uki)
- Tatta Hitotsu no Negai (たったひとつの、ねがい) (November 2012. Illustrator: Non)
- Hitomi no Sagashimono (瞳のさがしもの) (September 2013. Illustrator: Niwa)
- Boku no Shōkibo na Jisatsu (僕の小規模な自殺) (December 2013. Illustrator: loundraw)
- Europa no Soko kara (エウロパの底から) (March 2014. Illustrator: loundraw)
- Sabaku no Boys Life (砂漠のボーイズライフ) (July 2014. Illustrator: Izumi)
- Kami no Gomibako (神のゴミ箱) (February 2015. Illustrator: Ueda Ryō)
- Bocchies (ぼっちーズ) (April 2015. Illustrator: Atsuya Uki)
- Dead End: Shini Modori no Kenkyaku (デッドエンド 死に戻りの剣客) (May 2016. Illustrator: hakus)
- Shōjo Mōsō Chū (少女妄想中) (February 2017. Illustrator: Nio Nakatani)
- Kitto Kanojo wa Kami-sama Nanka Janai (きっと彼女は神様なんかじゃない) (August 2017. Illustrator: Fly)
- Mō Hitotsu no Inochi (もうひとつの命) (December 2017. Illustrator: Kuro no Kuro)
- Mō Hitori no Majo (もうひとりの魔女) (April 2018. Illustrator: Kuro no Kuro)
- Usotsuki Mii-kun to Kowareta Maa-chan Kanzenban: Shiawase no Haikei wa Fukō (嘘つきみーくんと壊れたまーちゃん 完全版 幸せの背景は不幸) (March 2023. Illustrator: Hidari)
