= Nanana's Buried Treasure =

Japanese light novel and anime series

- First light novel volume cover featuring the character Nanana Ryūgajō

龍ヶ嬢七々々の埋蔵金
- Genre: Supernatural
- Light novel
- Written by: Kazuma Ōtorino
- Illustrated by: Akaringo (vol. 1-7); Non (vol. 8-12)
- Published by: Enterbrain
- Imprint: Famitsu Bunko
- Original run: January 30, 2012 – December 28, 2016
- Volumes: 12
- Manga
- Written by: Kazuma Ōtorino
- Illustrated by: Hitoshi Okuda
- Published by: Enterbrain
- Magazine: Famitsu Comic Clear
- Original run: August 2012 – April 2013
- Volumes: 2
- Light novel

Ikkyū Tensai no Kiwamete Fuhoni na Meisuiri
- Written by: Kazuma Ōtorino
- Illustrated by: Akaringo (vol. 1), Non (vol. 2-)
- Published by: Enterbrain
- Imprint: Famitsu Bunko
- Original run: August 30, 2013 – April 30, 2015
- Volumes: 2
- Anime television series
- Directed by: Kanta Kamei
- Written by: Hideyuki Kurata
- Music by: Monaca: Keigo Hoashi
- Studio: A-1 Pictures
- Licensed by: AUS: Madman Entertainment; NA: Aniplex of America
- Original network: Fuji TV (Noitamina)
- Original run: April 10, 2014 – June 19, 2014
- Episodes: 11
- icon

Nanana's Buried Treasure (龍ヶ嬢七々々の埋蔵金, Ryūgajō Nanana no Maizōkin; lit. 'Nanana Ryūgajō's Buried Treasure') is a Japanese light novel series by Kazuma Ōtorino, with illustrations by Akaringo and Non. Enterbrain has published twelve volumes since January 2012 under their Famitsu Bunko imprint. A spin-off light novel series titled Ikkyū Tensai no Kiwamete Fuhon'i na Meisuiri (壱級天災の極めて不本意な名推理; lit. 'Tensai Ikkyū's Reluctant Deduction') is also published under Famitsu Bunko, with the first volume released on August 30, 2013. A manga adaptation by Hitoshi Okuda began serialization in Enterbrain's Famitsu Comic Clear web magazine in August 2012. An anime television series adaptation by A-1 Pictures began airing from April 10, 2014, on Fuji TV's noitamina block.

In July 2014 Nozomi Ōsaka, under penname Non, replaces Akaringo as illustrator for the original light novel and its spin-off due to Akaringo's health condition. Akaringo stated that his health declined, and which is why the illustration for seventh volume could not be finished. Due to this, the decision was made to replace the illustrator in both projects.

== Plot ==
On the "Special Student Zone" artificial island Nanaejima, the story centers on a beautiful, optimistic, but NEET (not in education, employment or training) girl Nanana Ryūgajō, who was mysteriously killed in her own apartment.

Ten years later, a boy named Juugo Yama was forced to transfer to a high school on the island. With only a certain amount of money to live on, Juugo chooses a low-rent apartment that happens to be haunted by the ghostly Nanana, who is bound to her former home and unable to move on. Juugo and members of the school's adventure club join a "treasure hunt royale" on the island for the Nanana Collection, treasures that possess mysterious powers.

== Characters ==
=== Main characters ===
Jūgo Yama (八真 重護, Yama Jūgo)
Voiced by: Yūki Ono
An energetic student in his second year of high school with strong stamina and endurance as well as a fondness for girls in maid outfits. He is devoted to helping Nanana move on, in spite of her constant commotion in his room, as he tries to find interest in her. Jūgo joins the school's Adventure Club on a hunt for the island's Nanana Collection. It is revealed he's secretly the heir of Matsuri, an ancient "noble" thief organization that claims to only steal from the wicked, but was banished to Nanae Island when he refused to take the position due to a difference in ideals. Jūgo claims he does not believe in doing things for others, and does not believe he'd give everything to help anyone. Despite refusing to take the position, Jūgo is actually quite good at stealing treasures, and managed to outmatch Tensai, Isshin, and even other Matsuri members a few times, although Tensai usually deduces it in the end. Jūgo's Nanana Collection is a large jewel that allows its user to tell when others lie when looking through it, which originally belongs to Ikkaku, but Jūgo intercepted it when Matsuri members attempted to steal it, and gave them a fake one later.
Nanana Ryūgajō (龍ヶ嬢 七々々, Ryūgajō Nanana)
Voiced by: Rui Tanabe
A ghost bound to Juugo's room since her assassination 10 years ago. Unable to leave the room, Nanana spends all her time playing video and online games, and eating her favorite and only food – pudding. Though she never appears bored with her lifestyle, in reality she is lonely until Jūgo rents the room. When she was alive, Nanana was an extremely famous adventurer on the island, part of the group called Great 7, discovering great treasures with mysterious powers all around the world. Her remaining treasures and property become the islands' greatest secret following her death. As an adventurer, Nanana knows all of her treasures' hidden locations, the traps protecting them, and their functions, but refuses to reveal their secrets, considering the secrets and risk a part of the precious experience. The treasure is referred as Nanana's Buried Treasure and the artifacts with hidden magical powers are referred as the Nanana Collection, and have been scattered across the island by an unknown party known as "Leprechaun".
Tensai Ikkyū (壱級 天災, Ikkyū Tensai)
Voiced by: Kana Asumi
Juugo's classmate. Tensai is smart and into solving puzzles; she aspires to be a master detective and refers to herself as such. Though smart, she has trouble properly explaining her deductions as her thoughts go too fast for her to fully express them. She moves into the apartment next to Jūgo's and becomes his neighbor. She knows that Jūgo is connected to Matsuri and declares him her rival, and thus frequently follows him and even occasionally wishes that events lead him to criminal activity. It is hinted that she has a crush on Jūgo from their adventures but doesn't want to admit it. Her Nanana Collection is a charm which is rumored to have exorcising ability. Whenever she meets someone, after they give their name she asks for their "real name".
Daruku Hoshino (星埜 ダルク, Hoshino Daruku)
Voiced by: Kana Hanazawa
Juugo's classmate and Tensai's assistant. Daruku is a male that gets mistaken for a female, and has a feminine appearance and personality. He generally dresses as a maid, and wears the women's uniform at school. It is hinted that he is attracted to Tensai and he gets upset when people mistake him for a female, he has occasionally been seen to offer Tensai food and then consider using the utensils to taste her saliva. Kagetora finds him attractive and they spend some time together.

=== Adventure club members ===
Isshin Yuiga (唯我 一心, Yuiga Isshin)
Voiced by: Kazuyuki Okitsu
A third-year student and President of the Adventure Club. He's obsessed with obtaining the Nanana's treasures' power. He had betrayed Jūgo and Tensai twice for Nanana's treasure, but failed in the end both times. He is known to be popular with girls. His Nanana Collection is a teapot that can make tea without tea leaves, and a pair of glasses that can copy other people's knowledge and abilities. He also had a magical staff that can grant wishes that he received by betraying Jūgo and Tensai, but was forcefully bought off by Ikkaku later.
Yū Ibara (茨 夕, Ibara Yū)
Voiced by: Eri Suzuki
The strict vice-president of the Adventure Club. She is loyal to Isshin, and will become angry whenever anyone speak ill of him.
Kagetora Tsurezure (徒然 影虎, Tsurezure Kagetora)
Voiced by: Yuki Hayashi
A club member who masters in reconnaissance. He has the ability for high agility, seen when used as a bodyguard.
Kasumi Konjō (今生 霞, Konjō Kasumi)
Voiced by: Ayako Kawasumi
One of the former residents of Nanana's room. Juugo finds a hidden manual that Kasumi left behind instructing him how to deal with Nanana. It is said Kasumi is one of the founders of the Adventure Club.
Hiiyo Ikusaba (戦場 緋夜, Ikusaba Hiiyo)
Voiced by: Tomokazu Sugita
Vice-president of the first generation Adventure Club. He serves as the main antagonist of the story, believes might makes right, and will threaten, use brute force, and sacrifice others to get what he wants. The first generation of Adventure club was almost disbanded when he used a female member as sacrifice in order to get a Nanana Collection, causing her to become physically crippled, and left the club with the collection. He came into conflict with the present Adventure club when he threatens Saki as she knows the clue about the treasure; the club fought him inside the treasure room. While he held off the group and fled, he was later intercepted by Matsuri members, under Jūgo's command. His Nanana Collections are a bell that can summon cloud and rain, a pair of shoes that allows the user to dive into shadows as if swimming, and a ring that allows the user to give strong mental suggestions to others. He is also the previous resident of Nanana's room, but was kicked out as he rarely stayed, did not pay the rent, and often left Nanana alone.

=== Matsuri ===
Jūgo's Father
Voiced by: Rikiya Koyama
The 13th leader of Matsuri, he banished Jūgo from the organization when the latter refuses to succeed his position. He is also collecting Nanana's treasure, which he declares that he is using them to conquer the world, although Jūgo consider him joking due to his personality.
Yukihime Fugi (不義 雪姫, Fugi Yukihime)
Voiced by: Mamiko Noto
A college girl, Yukihime is secretly a high-ranked member of Matsuri, and is the teacher of Jūgo's martial arts. She holds a grudge toward Jūgo for leaving Matsuri and is persistent in bringing him back. Jūgo later gave her a Nanana Collection, a pen that can shoot out chains to pin down the target to prevent his escape. She seems to hold feelings for Jūgo.
Shū Todomatsu (椴松 鷲, Todomatsu Shū)
Voiced by: Kōsuke Toriumi
A young member under Yukihime's command who is a master of disguise known as Hundred-Faces.

=== Great 7 ===
Ikkaku Shunjuu (一鶴 春秋, Shunjuu Ikkaku)
The administrator of the islands.
Shiki Maboro (真幌 肆季, Maboro Shiki)
Voiced by: Yumi Uchiyama
The landlady of the apartment that Juugo currently lives in. Shiki is Nanana's best friend from when she was still human, and they used to go on explorations on the island with the Great 7 group. She hopes Juugo could properly help Nanana cheer up and keep her company. However, Shiki does tend to drink alcohol a lot.

=== Three Skulls ===
Sansa Kurosu (黒須 参差, Kurosu Sansa)
Voiced by: Harumi Sakurai
Leader of the Three Skulls, the head of Nanae-jima underground. She was a member of Great 7, but was banished. Her Nanana Collection includes an eye patch that allows her to see from nearby people's eyesight, an arrow which can point to an item's location for the user, and a large white tiger.
Tetsunoshin Tsujimi (辻深 鉄之進, Tsujimi Tetsunoshin)
Voiced by: Yoshimasa Hosoya
A member of Three Skulls and Juugo's classmate. "Tetsu" carries a real Japanese sword and wields it proficiently. He is fervently devoted to protecting Saki, and will do anything and fight anyone for her sake, though he denies any romantic involvement.
Saki Yoshino (吉野 咲希, Yoshino Saki)
Voiced by: Misaki Kuno
A member of Three Skulls and a first year at Juugo's school. Kurosu nicknamed her "Yun" because she "looks like a 'Yun'". She suffers from a minor case of androphobia, though she is generally able to accept men once she knows them. She took a job request by Ikusaba to enter a particular ruin and retrieve the treasure inside, but failed and was severely injured. During this time she was missing for several days, and when she returned she did not remember anything about what had happened.

=== Others ===
Yurika Yumeji (夢路 百合香, Yumeji Yurika)
Voiced by: Kanae Itō
Juugo's classmate. Yurika is aspired to become a novelist, and she seems to have interest in Juugo.

== Media ==
=== Anime ===
An anime television series adaptation by A-1 Pictures began airing from April 10, 2014, on Fuji TV's noitamina block. The opening theme for the series was "Butterfly Effect" performed by Shiritsu Ebisu Chugaku and the ending theme is "Kasukana Hisokana Tashikana Mirai" (微かな密かな確かなミライ, lit. "A Hazy, Secret, Certain Future"), performed by the voice acting unit Sphere. The anime has been licensed for streaming by Aniplex of America.

Before the first light novel volume was published in January 2012, Enterbrain streamed a promotional video on December 26, 2011, with animation by A-1 Pictures, after the novel won the top prize at the 13th Enterbrain Entertainment Awards in September 2011.

=== Episode list ===
No.	Title	Original release date
1	"Disowned and Exiled" "Kandō-sarete Shimanagashi" (勘当されて島流し)	April 10, 2014
After being exiled and disowned by his father, Yama Juugo arrives in Nanaejima, an artificial island which also known as the Special Student Zone, and is glad to be free. He arrives in his apartment he rented only to be greeted by Ryuugajou Nanana, a ghost who resides in Juugo's new room. After playing some games with Nanana to determine who's the master of Juugo's room (and breaking his arm in the process), Juugo does some research about Nanana and even asks the landlady, Shiki Maboro, about her time with Nanana before her death. She reveals that Nanana was once an adventurer and part of the Great 7 group and even learns about Nanana's Collection, special treasures that have been scattered around the island. Back in his room, Juugo discovers a secret compartment in the bathroom containing a booklet titled "Nanana Manual" written by Konjou Kasumi. In addition to providing information about Nanana and the Adventure Club, Kasumi left a final request. At night, members of the phantom thief group Matsuri steal an item from one of the buildings. While Juugo is on the way back from a convenience store, he notices a small parachute holding a small box and a transponder.
2	"The Nanae Island Third High School Adventure Club" "Nanae-jima Dai San Kōtōbu Bōkenbu" (七重島第三高等部・冒険部)	April 17, 2014
After returning to his room, Juugo and Nanana realize the box contains a blue jewel called the Light-Up Lie Detector, one of Nanana's Collection. Elsewhere, the members of the Matsuri group Yukihime and Shu bicker over their heist failure as the jewel can't be found. The next morning, a young detective by the name Tensai investigates the scene of the crime with her assistant Daraku and confronts her prime suspect, Juugo, in his room. Tensai consulted convenience store security footage and even secretly unlocked Juugo's phone in her investigation. After seeing the proof that he's the thief, Juugo turns over the box containing the jewel. The next morning, Tensai was charged as the thief who stole the jewel. Soon, both Tensai and Daraku transfer to Juugo's school. Enticed by Yuu in a maid's outfit, Juugo is invited by Isshin Yuiga, the president of the Adventure Club, to join his club. After Yuiga's visit with Nanana, Nanana reveals to Juugo that the killer who murdered her has a dragon mark on the back of the neck and Juugo promises to help her find the killer. The next day, Yuiga tests Juugo, Tensai, and Daraku with a ruin. Though Juugo attempts to brute force the task with his strength and stamina, Tensai is able to solve the ruin's puzzle, and all three pass and become official members of the group.
3	"The Ruins 1,000 Meters Above Ground" "Chijō Sen Mētoru no Iseki" (地上1000mの《遺跡》)	April 24, 2014
Yuiga treats the three to tea brewed from the Collection item "The Teapot That Requires no Leaves" that was originally in the test ruin's treasure chest. After playing one of Nanana's games, she gives Juugo a hint to locating an item from her Collection and the Adventure Club discovers that the treasure resides in the shopping complex called Rising Building. Tensai is able to see past the mirror and forced perspective tricks to locate the exact room of the trial. Yuiga, Juugo, and Tensai are the three tasked with retrieving the item. Upon entering the room, machinery whirs and creates a maze of tubes. They quickly discover the danger of the maze and Juugo saves Tensai's life. Combining Juugo's and Yuiga's agility with Tensai's puzzle-solving, they are able to reach the treasure chest. After obtaining the treasure, Yuiga betrays Tensai and Juugo and leaves them stranded in the center of the room. While sharing a moment atop the chest, Juugo informs Tensai that he contacted the police to rescue them. Two police officers come to help them and detain Juugo for questioning. It turns out that the police officers are from Matsuri. Back at Juugo's place, Nanana reveals that Yuiga obtained "The Wizard's Cane" that can grant the bearer any wish while Tensai messages Juugo that she found Yuiga's location and intention to sell the cane to Ikkaku Shunjuu, the head of the Great Seven.
4	"Dreams and Ambitions and Denial and Attraction" "Yume to ka Yabō to ka Hitei to ka Akogare to ka" (夢とか野望とか否定とか憧れとか)	May 1, 2014
In a flashback, Kasumi leaves Nanana, revealing she saw her fate in the "Future-Revealing Mirror." While Matsuri member Shu distracts Tensai, Juugo teams up with Yukihime to steal back The Wizard's Cane from Yuiga. In exchange, Juugo hands Yukihime the Light-Up Lie Detector jewel. Yuiga intended to use the cane to control Ikkaku and become the most powerful man on the island. Both groups clash and Juugo is badly injured after taking damage from Yuiga's spells from the cane until the cane's power suddenly deactivates. Juugo reveals that the cane's power is limited and tells Yuiga that he didn't think of the flaws as he only assumed it was the most powerful artifact. Stunned, Yuiga was about be punched by Juugo but was saved by his other assistant, Kagetora. Yuiga's group manages to escape, only to be surrounded by an army marshaled by Tensai, operating as Ikkaku's messenger. Later, Yuiga meets with Juugo and apologizes for what he has done. As Juugo leaves, he warns Yuiga not to betray them again. Back at the apartment, Juugo sees Tensai waiting for him. To his surprise, Tensai deduced Juugo's relations with Matsuri after she downloaded a hacking software into his phone the day she first entered his room. However, she doesn't turn him in to the police as she needs a rival and decides to live near his room. After she leaves, Juugo receives a call from his dad and they discuss Juugo's selfish ideal of not helping others even he has the talent. Furious, Juugo retorts and hangs up. Returning to his room, he reveals that he gave a fake to Yukihime. Nanana seems okay with it as she entrusts him in finding the killer for her.
5	"Mission: Impossible" "Misshon Inposshiburu" (ミッション・インポッシブル)	May 8, 2014
Yuiga treats the Adventure Club to dinner using the funds raised from the forced sale of the Wizard's Cane and suggests that they all take an overnight trip to a nearby hot springs rumored to have a ruins. Juugo attempts to get another hint from Nanana but she refuses as it would take away from the fun of the hunt. Yukihime contacts Juugo and they meet at a nearby cafe where she attempts to convince Juugo to return to Matsuri, but he refuses and Yukihime severs contact. Back at his apartment, Juugo discovers Tensai, Daraku, and Shiki gaming with Nanana. Shiki also hands Juugo the utilities bill which boasts an absurd electricity cost due to Nanana's 24/7 gaming habit and informs him that utilities must be paid by the end of the week or he will be evicted. Juugo locates "The Guild" which offers secret jobs to supplement the low part-time income the island rules allow. Juugo accepts a lucrative delivery job to the Tsukuyomi District where he meets Shu, who helps guide him through the shady area to the drop-off point. There, Juugo meets Tetsu, Yun, and "Sister"--the head of the Three Skulls organization. Sister threatens Juugo, but directs Tetsu to escort him out once a raid on the base breaks out. In the chaos, Juugo realizes he was never paid for the delivery and must resort to selling Nanana's games to pay the utilities bill.
6	"To the Hot Springs Town" "Iza, Onsen Machi e" (いざ、温泉街へ)	May 15, 2014
The Adventure Club arrives at the hot springs town and Juugo resolves to locate the town's specialty pudding in order to apologize to Nanana for selling her games. At the hot springs, Juugo is introduced to Kagetora who apologizes for the previous attack. Much to his surprise, Juugo sees Yukihime at the hotel, but she ignores him. When everyone is shown their rooms, Juugo requests a separate room, claiming to being a loud snorer. At dinner, Yuiga goes over the floor layout of the abandoned house containing the ruins as Kagetora has already confirmed the special key unlocks the door. With just the floorplans, Tensai is able to locate the room of the ruins and the club commits to meeting in the hotel lobby at 10 A.M. The next morning, Juugo meets up with Tensai and Daraku, when they find out from an employee that Yuiga has already left for the house and gotten a headstart on the trial. The room is revealed to be an agility puzzle with trapped stepping stones and a water trap below. Tensai is suspicious of how quickly Juugo tackles the room considering Kagetora is still having trouble despite his headstart. Juugo reaches the chest, clearing the room, and reveals the item inside is a stuffed cat. The club members go to the hot springs to relax from the day's work, but discover that the security locker the cat was stored in is now empty. They question the employees and other guests of the hotel but come to a standstill with Juugo defending Yukihime until Tensai provides evidence that Shu had disguised himself as a maid in order to pilfer the item away in the laundry. On the train back, Tensai confronts Juugo, believing he teamed up with the Matsuri duo to take the Nanana's Collection item and leaked the ruins location for money to pay for the utilities. However, back in room 202, Nanana reveals that the stuffed cat is not part of her Collection and ends up locking Juugo out of the room as punishment for selling the games.
7	"Counseling for Bad Guys" "Akutō no o Nayami Sōdan" (悪党のお悩み相談)	May 22, 2014
The specialty pudding Juugo mailed to the apartment finally arrives and Nanana reluctantly forgives Juugo after he promises to buy more games. Also hidden in the pudding box was the actual Nanana's collection treasure from the hot springs ruins, an ornate golden stake. Because Yukihime was also at the hot springs and may have overheard the Adventure Club's dinner plans, Juugo decided to go to the ruins in the night to secure the treasure first, replacing it with the stuffed cat toy decoy. Tensai and Daraku appear in the doorway; despite overhearing the confession, Tensai assures Juugo that she won't expose him. After all, stealing, lying, anything to get an advantage should be fair game in seeking Nanana's Collection. Later, Nanana counsels Juugo, who is still struggling with knowing that, despite the unwritten rules of the underground, Yukihime still tried to steal the Collection item from Juugo. Seeing Juugo cry over Yukihime's betrayal, Nanana comforts him and encourages him to try to change the situation before becoming depressed. Emboldened, Juugo goes to meet Yukihime and sets a wager: if Yukihime wins, Juugo will hand over the hot springs treasure but if Juugo wins, Yukihime will apologize for stealing. Yukihime thoroughly wallops Juugo, but he pulls out the Collection treasure and binds Yukihime in unbreakable chains. Yukihime finally breaks down and verbally lashes out against Juugo's selfishness and for betraying her by leaving Matsuri. Juugo releases the chains and chastises her for not being clear about her wishes and for betraying him in turn. Juugo and Yukihime are able to reconcile and come to an understanding. At the base of the tower, Yukihime meets up with Shu, who questions if they should be working with Juugo. Yukihime tasks Shu with locating Sanada Fumika, an informant and member of the original Adventure Club. Back at his room, Juugo questions if he wants Nanana to pass on and leave room 202.
8	"A Strange Visitor" "Kimyō na Raihōsha" (奇妙な来訪者)	May 29, 2014
After pulling an all-nighter gaming with Nanana, Tensai, and Daraku, Juugo notices a strange presence watching him. Back at school, a first-year meets with Tensai and hands her an envelope although she appears dissatisfied and abruptly leaves class. Tsujimi Tetsunoshin transfers into Juugo's class, to the surprise of both. Juugo also meets Yun, who reveals her true name is Yoshino Saki and is a student at school. At the Adventure Club, Kagetora decides to confront Yuiga over his lack of trust in the younger students. Later, Juugo and Nanana get an unexpected guest on their balcony, Ikusaba Hiiyo, who has come to ask Nanana about a Collection item: "The Rain Bell." After learning about its powers, he calls it garbage, distressing Nanana. A drunk Shiki chases down Ikusaba, while Juugo goes out to find her and some pudding to cheer Nanana up. After finding Shiki, Juugo asks her about Ikusaba who was Room 202's previous tenant, but he completely neglected Nanana and Shiki evicted him. Juugo returns to Nanana with the pudding and they talk about the Collection and Nanana's Rules. Nanana adheres to her rules because if she doesn't, she believes "there's no point in me being me." In bed, Juugo struggles to understand why he wants to find the Collection himself and worries he's just like Ikusaba. The next day, Juugo, Tetsunoshin, and Saki go to the arcade after school where they run into Ikusaba. Ikusaba also pays a visit to the school and Yuiga, although he only speaks to Yuiga with disdain for his perceived weaknesses. Yuiga tasks Kagetora with following Ikusaba, suspecting he is plotting against the Adventure Club, and gives him explicit instructions to run if spotted.
9	"A Study of Hiiyo Ikusaba and Saki Yoshino" "Ikusaba Hiiyo to Yoshino Saki ni Tsuite no Kōsatsu" (戦場緋夜と吉野咲希についての考察)	June 5, 2014
In a flashback, Yuiga confronts Ikusaba for endangering the life of a fellow Adventure Club member in a ruins, though Ikusaba shows no remorse and reiterates that the search for Nanana's Collection is a competition with no rules. In the present day, Juugo meets up with Yumeji, Tetsunoshin, and Saki at the Southred Mall for a fun trip. They are followed by Ikusaba who, in turn, is tailed by Kagetora. Kagetora gets distracted and loses track of Ikusaba--he relocates him, but Ikusaba disappears in the shadows and reappears in front of Kagetora. Kagetora attempts to run, but Ikusaba somehow tracks him down wherever he goes. Ikusaba manages to subdue Kagetora and sends him to the hospital. After the trip to Southred Mall, Saki and Tetsunoshin return to their dorms, going their separate ways. On her way back, Saki is accosted by Ikusaba who questions her, although Saki has no recollection of anything. Tetsunoshin arrives and fights off Ikusaba who discovers they are part of Three Skulls, meaning Kurosu Sansa is involved, upsetting Ikusaba. The next day, Tetsunoshin informs Juugo of the attack, and also of Sansa's desire to protect Saki from Ikusaba. Juugo returns to the Adventure Club to ask about Ikusaba and Yuiga details his past with Adventure Club and Ikusaba's ruthless tactics. Yuiga pledges to help Juugo if he attempts to face off with Ikusaba. Tensai and Daraku finally return to school and reveal they were investigating a missings-person secret job, that of Yoshino Saki. She discovered that when Saki disappeared, she was investigating a building for a secret job posted by Ikusaba. Adventure Club resolves to clear the ruins Saki was investigating to dissuade Ikusaba from further targeting Saki. Yuugo begs Nanana for a hint to expedite the search for the ruins entrance, but refuses to tell Nanana why he is in such a rush. She relents and gives a hint, on the condition that Yuugo never uses the Collection treasure's power.
10	"Showdown" "Taiketsu" (対決)	June 12, 2014
At Southred Mall, Adventure Club uses Nanana's hint to locate several inscriptions and pinpoint the entrance to the ruins, while Juugo sneaks into the security office and steals a special electromagnetic key. The entrance is in a public location, so they decide to return after the mall closes to clear it. Juugo, Tensai, Yuiga, and Yuu enter the ruins with Daraku and the injured Kagetora standing watch. As with the previous trials, Juugo attempts to brute force the room, triggering multiple spike traps before Tensai reveals the solution to the puzzle to find the safe path down. Juugo and Yuiga find a bloodied bag which causes Juugo to worry about the girls, startling Tensai, who slips and falls. Tensai luckily lands on a safe platform but is too shaken up to continue. Juugo picks her up and sprints the rest of the way, disregarding the traps he's setting off. At the entrance, Kagetora senses Ikusaba and hides, allowing him to enter the ruins. At the bottom, Adventure Club find the chest but before they can solve the puzzle lock, they are stopped by Ikusaba. He admits to using Saki to test the ruins and swears to not allow the members of Adventure Club to leave for getting in his way. Juugo, Yuu, and Yuiga fight Ikusaba but he uses his Shadowfins boots to weave among the shadows to dodge and strike. Yuiga also reveals his Mimic Glasses are part of Nanana's Collection and allow him to copy the techniques of anyone he watches. During the fight, Tensai solves the puzzle, and goads Ikusaba. He punches her, but Tensai strikes back with a taser, laboring his breath due to the pain and neutering Ikusaba's ability to use his Shadowfins. With Yuiga activating the secret ability of the Mimic Glasses to read minds, Juugo and Yuu are able to turn the tables on Ikusaba, forcing him to use his trump card.
11	"The Resolve of Juugo Yama" "Yama Jūgo ga Kimeru Kakugo" (八真重護が決める覚悟)	June 19, 2014
Ikusaba uses "The Whisper of the Death God" to collapse one of Juugo's lungs and break his right arm. Tensai interferes, firing a rubber bullet and offers a proposal allowing everyone to depart separately. Tensai tells Ikusaba she has figured out the power of the other Nanana Collection treasure. Tensai is able to convince Ikusaba to leave and stay away from Saki. As it turns out, the Whisper can only impose suggestions--Juugo's lungs and arms were never damaged, but the power of the ring convinces the brain to believe they've been damaged, causing the body to experience pain. Before Ikusaba leaves, Yuiga talks with him with newfound resolve to become the best treasure hunter on the island. Tensai reveals to Juugo that she was bluffing about knowing the entire secret behind the Collection item's power. In the end, the puzzle lock turned out to be decorative only and the chest was unlocked the whole time. Tensai brings the Collection treasure to Nanana who asks her why Juugo was hiding his reasons; Tensai reveals that they fought with Ikusaba for the treasure, allowing Nanana to understand Juugo's reticence and challenges Tensai to a bet. Later, Tensai meets up with Juugo and offers the Collection treasure to him, claiming it can allow the user to see past events. Tempted by the prospect of uncovering Nanana's killer, Juugo remembers his promise to Nanana and refuses the treasure. Tensai reveals she lied about the treasure's power to bait him into breaking his promise with Nanana and that the treasure is the "Evil Spirit Ward." Back at the apartment, Juugo resolves to find out exactly what Nanana wants and challenges her to another fight. Their battle wakes Shiki who eavesdrops on them through the door. While Nanana subdues Juugo, he refuses to give up. His resolve convinces Nanana to give up and tell him what she truly wants. Although she wants to find and kill her killer, Nanana believes that won't cause her to move on, as staying would allow her to watch the world, and Juugo, a little longer. In a post-credits scene, Yuiga stares at Saki's bloodstained ID from the bag they found in the Southred Mall ruins and Saki enters another ruins.

== Reception ==
Theron Martin of Anime News Network published a positive review of the complete anime series, giving it an overall B+ rating. Despite the story being told halfway through and some inconsistency in the animation, Martin praised the diverse and dramatically intriguing ensemble cast, Kanta Kamei's overall direction and the artistic architecture throughout Nanae Island, saying the episodes "find a good balance between humor, action, character development, and the occasional more serious overtones, all while keeping the decided silliness factor surprisingly well under control." Stig Høgset from THEM Anime Reviews also gave praise to the main cast for being likable and having intelligence, and the "generally appealing" production of its action scenes, character artwork and animation being fluid but felt disappointed with the various secrets and treasures that encompass the worldbuilding of Nanae Island, concluding with, "Kind of incomplete and somewhat underwhelming for all its ambitions, Nanana's Buried Treasure is still a fun show to watch."
