= Ground Control to Psychoelectric Girl =

Japanese light novel series and its franchise

- Cover of volume 1 of Ground Control to Psychoelectric Girl featuring Erio Tōwa

電波女と青春男
- Genre: Comedy; Coming-of-age; Slice of life
- Light novel
- Written by: Hitoma Iruma
- Illustrated by: Buriki
- Published by: ASCII Media Works
- Imprint: Dengeki Bunko
- Original run: January 10, 2009 – April 10, 2011
- Volumes: 8 + 1 extra
- Manga
- Written by: Hitoma Iruma
- Illustrated by: Masato Yamane
- Published by: ASCII Media Works
- Magazine: Dengeki G's Magazine
- Original run: August 30, 2010 – July 30, 2013
- Volumes: 4
- Anime television series
- Directed by: Akiyuki Shinbo; Yukihiro Miyamoto
- Produced by: Kozue Kaneniwa (Movic); Kazuma Miki (ASCII Media Works); Junnosuke Miyamoto (King Records); Junichirou Tanaka (TBS)
- Written by: Yuniko Ayana
- Music by: Franz Maxwell I. (Yoshiaki Fujisawa, Kenichi Maeyamada, Yusuke Itagaki)
- Studio: Shaft
- Licensed by: BI: MVM Films; NA: NIS America
- Original network: TBS, MBS, CBC, BS-i
- Original run: April 15, 2011 – July 1, 2011
- Episodes: 12 + OVA
- icon

Ground Control to Psychoelectric Girl (Japanese: 電波女と青春男, Hepburn: Denpa Onna to Seishun Otoko; lit. 'Electrowave Girl and Youthful Boy') (Note: "Denpa" or "Electric Wave" is used in Japanese to refer to a person who is crazy or holds odd views, similar to the English term "Tin foil hat".) is a Japanese light novel series written by Hitoma Iruma, with illustrations by Buriki. The series includes eight novels released between January 2009 and April 2011, published by ASCII Media Works under their Dengeki Bunko imprint. A manga adaptation was serialized in ASCII Media Works's Dengeki G's Magazine. A 12-episode anime adaptation by Shaft aired in Japan between April and July 2011, with an original video animation episode released in February 2012.

== Plot ==
Makoto Niwa transfers to a new school and moves in with his aunt, Meme Tōwa. He is confused when he meets his first cousin, Erio, because he thought his aunt lived alone. Erio, who claims she is an extraterrestrial lifeform, does not attend school and wraps herself in a futon. Surprised by his cousin's eccentricity, he needs time to adapt to the tumultuous new life that has been sprung onto him.

== Characters ==
Makoto Niwa (丹羽 真, Niwa Makoto)
Voiced by: Miyu Irino
Makoto is a second-year high school student and the protagonist of the story, who transfers into the city after his parents go overseas. He constantly tries to monitor his 'adolescence points', which rise and fall based on his encounters with girls. He strongly disbelieves in the supernatural, like aliens, espers, etc.
Erio Tōwa (藤和 エリオ, Tōwa Erio)
Voiced by: Asuka Ōgame
Erio is Makoto's first cousin with blue hair growing down to her ankles and is almost always barefoot even when outside. She disappeared the previous June while she was a first-year in high school and went missing for six months. When she reappeared that November, she had no memory of what happened during that time. She also became extremely fascinated with aliens, believing herself to be an alien investigator monitoring humanity. Following an incident where she broke her leg while trying to fly on her bike, she started wrapping herself in a futon. Initially she is soft spoken and unsociable but eventually opens up due to Makoto's influence, which also included disproving her delusion of being an alien herself. She holds Makoto very dear to herself. She is reluctant to return to school (due to her shady reputation) so she gets a part time job at her great-grandmother's convenience store and even joins a pick-up baseball team to spend time with her cousin. Her birthday has apparently been forgotten, but her family decides to celebrate it on June 7, the day after her mother's birthday.
Meme Tōwa (藤和 女々, Tōwa Meme)
Voiced by: Ai Nonaka
Meme is Makoto's aunt and Erio's mother. She also goes under the name Jojo and is an owner of a store that sells sweets. She is cheerful and often teases Makoto by attempting to seduce him and actually cares for him a lot. She has no plans to marry and is happy with her life with her daughter Erio and her nephew Makoto. She allows Erio to stay home from school and do as she pleases. She explains to Makoto that it is the only effective way to deal with her daughter's eccentricities. Her actions do not make her look any less eccentric than her daughter, but it is shown that she is actually wiser than she usually acts. Meme's birthday is June 6.
Ryūko Mifune (御船 流子, Mifune Ryūko)
Voiced by: Emiri Katō
Mifune is Makoto's classmate and has feelings for him. Due to the kanji in her name, she is often nicknamed Ryūshi, which she does not particularly like. Correcting others when they address her as Ryūshi happens so often that it has almost become her catchphrase. She is a vegetarian, referring to herself as a "fruitist" (fruitarian). She plays on the school's basketball team and has an energetic personality.
Maekawa (前川)
Voiced by: Mai Fuchigami
Maekawa is another of Makoto's classmates who is very tall for a girl (she claims to be 179.9 cm tall) and always refers to Makoto as 'transfer student' as she can never get his name right. She later says that it's kind of embarrassing for her to change the way she addresses Makoto(It is hinted that she has feelings for Makoto). She is very calm and sometimes expressionless perhaps due to having a weak body and sometimes amuses herself by teasing Ryūko. She gets dizzy if she raises her arms over her head for more than ten seconds, and often wears various costumes. Her parents own a bar in the shopping district and she has several part-time jobs. She insists on wearing cosplay to work even when her supervisor insists her not to.
Yashiro Hoshimiya (星宮 社, Hoshimiya Yashiro)
Voiced by: Yuka Iguchi
A white-haired girl who claims to be an alien esper, who is often seen wearing a spacesuit and occasionally talking in a silly alien-like manner. She is rumored to be a troublesome runaway and it has been vaguely hinted that she really possesses supernatural powers, however this is not made clear.
Ashiro (安代)
Voiced by: Yasunori Matsumoto
Childhood friend of Meme and Elliott. He wears a cattle tag on his right ear, one of his granny's whims. He had previously moved away and returned to town in April. Ashiro proposes to Meme when they first meet again but is rejected right away, though he still adores her. His hobby is launching water rockets and is the son of a local fireworks maker.
Nakajima (中島)
Voiced by: Takahiro Mizushima
Makoto met this blonde boy when playing for the amateur baseball team. Ryuko tells Makoto that she had once confessed to Nakajima and that he had rejected her, explaining the awkwardness between them.
Hanazawa (花沢)
Voiced by: Kana Hanazawa
The captain of the girls softball team and a terrific pitcher. She is also a ringer for the opposing baseball team. Hanazawa has a calm demeanor and is going out with Nakajima.

== Media ==
=== Light novels ===
Denpa Onna to Seishun Otoko began as a series of light novels written by Hitoma Iruma and with illustrations provided by Buriki. Eight novels were published by ASCII Media Works under their Dengeki Bunko imprint between January 10, 2009, and April 10, 2011. One extra volume titled Denpa Onna to Seishun Otoko SF (Sukoshi Fushigi) Ban (電波女と青春男 SF（すこしふしぎ）版) was published on April 10, 2011.

No.	Release date	ISBN
1	January 10, 2009	978-4-04-867468-3
2	May 10, 2009	978-4-04-867810-0
3	November 10, 2009	978-4-04-868138-4
4	March 10, 2010	978-4-04-868395-1
5	June 10, 2010	978-4-04-868596-2
6	September 10, 2010	978-4-04-868880-2
7	December 10, 2010	978-4-04-870125-9
8	April 10, 2011	978-4-04-870430-4
SF	April 10, 2011	978-4-04-870470-0

=== Manga ===
A manga adaptation, illustrated by Masato Yamane, was serialized in ASCII Media Works' Dengeki G's Magazine between the October 2010 and September 2013 issues. ASCII Media Works published four tankōbon volumes between May 27, 2011, and August 27, 2013.

No.	Release date	ISBN
1	May 27, 2011	978-4-04-870482-3
2	March 27, 2012	978-4-04-886458-9
3	December 15, 2012	978-4-04-891197-9
4	August 27, 2013	978-4-04-891691-2

=== Internet radio show ===
An Internet radio show to promote the anime series and other Denpa Onna to Seishun Otoko media called Denpa Mail to Seishun Radio (電波メールと青春ラジオ) streamed six episodes online between April 7 and June 16, 2011. The show was hosted by Asuka Ōgame, the voice of Erio Tōwa in the anime, and was produced by Animate TV.

=== Anime ===
A 12-episode anime television series adaptation animated by Shaft, written by Yuniko Ayana, and directed by Akiyuki Shinbo and Yukihiro Miyamoto aired in Japan from April 15 to July 1, 2011, on TBS. King Records released the anime on seven Blu-ray and DVD compilation volumes in Japan between June 22, 2011, and February 8, 2012. The final volume contains an original video animation episode. The opening theme is "Os-Uchūjin" (Os-宇宙人, Os-Alien), performed by Erio o Kamatte-chan, which comprises Asuka Ōgame and Shinsei Kamattechan, and the ending theme is "Lulu" (ルル, Ruru), performed by Etsuko Yakushimaru. The anime is licensed in North America by NIS America for a home video release in 2013 under the title Ground Control to Psychoelectric Girl.

No.	Title	Directed by (Note: Information is taken from the ending credits of each episode.)	Storyboarded by	Original release date
1	"City of Aliens"; Transliteration: "Uchūjin no Tokai" (Japanese: 宇宙人の都会)	Tomoyuki Itamura	Tomoyuki Itamura	April 15, 2011
High school boy Makoto Niwa transfers to a new city, where he is introduced to his aunt, Meme Tōwa. Dreaming of living in a student home by himself, Makoto discovers the house is also inhabited by a girl wrapped up in a futon mattress, who is introduced as Meme's daughter and Makoto's cousin, Erio. After enrolling into his new school, Makoto tries to get to know Erio, who mostly speaks in confusing scientific jargon. While taking her to a supermarket, Makoto is able to undo the mattress, revealing Erio as a beautiful blue haired girl, who claims to be an investigator descended from aliens, and claiming that the Earth is being targeted.
2	"Reverie of My Disappearing Adolescence"; Transliteration: "Shissōsuru Shishunki no Reverī" (Japanese: 失踪する思春期のレヴェリー)	Shinichi Omata	Shinichi Omata	April 22, 2011
Makoto spends the night eating convenience store dinners with Erio. The next day, Makoto rides home from school with his strange classmate, Ryūko Mifune. The following day, he gets acquainted with another classmate, Maekawa, who gets dizzy if she holds her arms above her head for more than 10 seconds. Later that night, Makoto goes with Erio to the beach, where she randomly walks into the sea, claiming she can fly. On their way back, they run into Maekawa, who reveals that Erio was a former student in their school who disappeared for half a year. Meme later reveals that Erio has no memories of the half a year she was gone and had started to believe in aliens. She also mentions Erio broke her leg while trying to fly on her bike, which caused her to start wrapping in her futon.
3	"A Strange Moment for the Girl Bound to the Ground"; Transliteration: "Chi o Hau Shōjo no Fushigi na Setsuna" (Japanese: 地を這う少女の不思議な刹那)	Takashi Kawabata	Nobuhiro Sugiyama	April 29, 2011
Makoto goes on a day out with Ryūko, who explains her stance on mysteries. Makoto relays what Meme had told him to Erio, though she seems reluctant to respond. Later, Meme tells Makoto not to get involved with Erio. Though he still wants to help her, Makoto decides to dispel her belief in aliens as the first step. He attempts this by taking her on her old bike and riding off a hill to disprove her ability to fly. The hill turns out to be a bit too steep, and they both go flying into the sea. Erio starts to come to terms with her being a simple Earthling and manages to introduce herself properly to Makoto.
4	"One Month to Mend a Broken Right Arm"; Transliteration: "Migiude Kossetsu Zenchi Ikkagetsu" (Japanese: 右腕骨折全治一箇月)	Yoshito Mikamo	Tetsuo Hirakawa	May 6, 2011
Following his recent bike trip, Makoto is hospitalized with a broken arm. While in hospital, he is visited by Ryūko and Maekawa, who are surprised to hear that he's living with Erio. After two weeks, Makoto is discharged from hospital and returns home, where he finally sees Erio again, who gives her thanks for bringing her back to reality.
5	"The Melancholy of Thanksgiving"; Transliteration: "Sankusugibingu no Yūutsu" (Japanese: サンクスギビングの憂鬱)	Masahiro Mukai	Shinsaku Sasaki	May 13, 2011
As Meme reaches her 40th birthday, she decides to hold a sort-of-birthday the next day for Erio, who had missed her birthday during her disappearance. After Makoto gets Erio a present as per Maekawa's recommendation, Erio reveals she wants to get a job and try to return to society. Her reputation as a weirdo leads to her fail an interview, however, Meme manages to find her a job at the Tamura shop, run by her grandmother who believes in aliens.
6	"Ryū'ko'-san's feeling... kinda... glum..." Transliteration: "Ryū"ko"-san no, Nanchū ka, Moyātto" (Japanese: リュウ『コ』さんの、なんちゅーか、もやーっと)	Takahiro Majima	Kiyoko Sayama	May 20, 2011
Ryūko goes with her friend to the Tamura shop, where she encounters Erio and also spots Makoto. The next day, she decides to visit the place, running into Meme along the way. Afterward, Ryūko talks to Makoto about the bad reputation Erio has at school, mentioning it may cause him troubles if he is seen hanging out with her. Later, Makoto asks the old lady for some advice on the matter. A few days later, Ryūko and Maekawo visit the Tōwa household, where Makoto has trouble keeping Erio under control. As Meme returns and the suggests the girls stay for dinner, she openly hints that Ryūko might be a match for Makoto.
7	"A Day Someone Will Remember"; Transliteration: "Dareka-san no Omoide ni Naru Hi" (Japanese: 誰かさんの思い出になる日)	Yuki Yase	Tetsuo Hirakawa	May 27, 2011
Maekawa is confused by an anonymous person leaving soft drinks outside of the sweets store she works at, suspecting someone who launches bottle rockets nearby. She later meets with the culprit, who claims to be a fan of hers and commissions her to make more bottle rockets. She accepts the job, asking Makoto, Erio and Ryūko to help out. After they each make some rice bowls for dinner, Erio invites Maekawa and Ryuko to stay for the night, where Ryuko mentions to Makoto about it being her birthday the next day and how she'd take his side if it came down to people picking on Erio. The next day, they go to the beach where they join the bottle rocketeer in launching their bottle rockets.
8	"Tsiolkovsky's Prayer"; Transliteration: "Tsiorukofusukī no Inori" (Japanese: ツィオルコフスキーの祈り)	Hisato Shimoda	Akira Hashimoto	June 3, 2011
The episode focuses on Meme during the events of the previous weeks. On June 12th, she gets a bottle rocket tested out by the bottle rocketeer, who suddenly asks her to marry him. While avoiding him for a week, Meme recalls 28 years ago when she first met Elliot, the boy who would become Erio's father. Meme later visits the rocketeer to refuse his proposal, later learning he had mistaken Maekawa for Erio while trying to woo Meme with his rockets. Meme then convinces her granny to accompany her for the launching of the bottle rockets at the beach, pitching the whole thing as an attack on aliens, like Elliot told her when they were kids.
9	"Region Limited Alien Incident"; Transliteration: "Chiiki Gentei Uchūjin Jiken" (Japanese: 地域限定宇宙人事件)	Tomoyuki Itamura	Tomoyuki Itamura	June 10, 2011
Maekawa invites Makoto to join in a game of baseball with various other people. Later that night, Makoto goes stargazing with Erio. She joins in the match the next day, where they meet a strange person dressed as an astronaut claiming to be an esper.
10	"Overhanging Deck Girl"; Transliteration: "Nokishita Shōjo" (Japanese: 軒下少女)	Takashi Kawabata	Tetsuo Hirakawa	June 17, 2011
Makoto and Erio continued to be bothered by the spacegirl, who later introduces herself as Yashiro Hoshimiya. Later that night, Ryuko calls Makoto about her upcoming basketball game, asking him to accompany her to the festival if she is able to play in it. The next day, Meme has Makoto take Yashiro back to her place, stopping by a pool along the way.
11	"This Summer is about Basketball and Espers and Futons and Astronomical Observations and Festivals and Baseball and Meme and..." Transliteration: "Kotoshi no Natsu wa Basuke to Chōnōryoku to Futon to Tentai Kansoku to Matsuri to Yakyū to Meme-tan to" (Japanese: 今年の夏はバスケと超能力と布団と天体観測と祭りと野球と女々たんと)	Shinichi Omata	Kazuhiro Soeta	July 1, 2011
Maekawa invites Makoto over to her house for lunch, where he spots Yashiro lurking in her garden. The next, Ryuko invites Makoto to watch her basketball match where she meets her friend, Miki, and also runs into Yashiro again. As Ryuko struggles in her match, Yashiro encourages Makoto to cheer for her, giving her the confidence to score some points.
12	"0.00000000198 Centimeters Per Second"; Transliteration: "Byōsoku 0.00000000198 Senchimētoru" (Japanese: 秒速0.00000000198センチメートル)	Yukihiro Miyamoto	Shinsaku Sasaki; Akiyuki Shinbo (Note: Shinbo boarded the avan (in English referred to as a cold open) segment of the 12th episode according to series writer Yuniko Ayana, but remains uncredited in the episode itself.)	July 1, 2011
On the day of the baseball match, Maekawa's father runs away due to pressure, leaving the shopping district team short on pitchers. With Meme declaring herself coach, she sends Makoto to search for Maekawa's father while Erio pitches. After returning with Maekawa's father, Makoto is made the pinch hitter. As he makes a powerful hit, a strong wind kicks up, turning it into a home run. As a reward, Meme kisses Makoto on the cheek in front of everyone.
13 (OVA)	"Midnight Sun"; Transliteration: "Mayonaka no Taiyō" (Japanese: 真夜中の太陽)	Masahiro Mukai	Shinsaku Sasaki	February 8, 2012
Makoto goes to the summer festival with Ryūko. Afterwards, as promised, he meets up with Erio in an old temple to look at the stars. As they watch the Perseid meteor shower, Yashiro appears to declare that she will leave but not before showing her esper powers. She tells Makoto to step back, and shortly afterwards a meteorite falls in the exact spot where he was previously standing, destroying the torii. He is left with just a small injury and becomes bewildered wondering if Yashiro was actually an esper and/or an alien and that he can't say for sure that aliens and espers are unreal.

== Works cited ==
- Shinbo, Akiyuki (2012). 新房語 [Shinbogatari] (in Japanese). Ichijinsha. ISBN 978-4-7580-1259-1.
