= Éclair (manga) =

Japanese manga anthology

- First tankōbon volume cover

エクレア あなたに響く百合アンソロジー (Éclair: Anata ni Hibiku Yuri Anthology)
- Genre: Yuri
- Manga
- Written by: Various
- Published by: ASCII Media Works
- English publisher: NA: Yen Press
- Original run: November 26, 2016 – March 26, 2020
- Volumes: 7

Éclair: A Girls' Love Anthology That Resonates in Your Heart (エクレア あなたに響く百合アンソロジー) is a Japanese yuri manga anthology written and illustrated by numerous creators such as Nio Nakatani, Uta Isaki, Hachi Itō, and Auri Hirao. It published 5 mainline anthologies and 2 special anthologies between November, 2016 and March, 2020. It was licensed for an English-language release by Yen Press in 2017.

== Overview ==
Éclair was announced in September 2016 as a project that would be produced by Dengeki Daioh, with the first volume being released on November 26, 2016. The first edition went into reprint immediately after its release and due to this success it was decided that the anthology line would continue. From the subsequent volumes, words indicating colors were used in the title.

The series is licensed for an English release in North America by Yen Press.

=== Volumes ===
No.	Title	Original release date	English release date
1	Éclair: A Girls' Love Anthology That Resonates in Your Heart エクレア あなたに響く百合アンソロジー	November 26, 2016; 978-4-04-892432-0	June 5, 2018; 978-1-9753-2617-3
2	Éclair Blanche: A Girls' Love Anthology That Resonates in Your Heart エクレア blanche あなたに響く百合アンソロジー	June 26, 2017; 978-4-04-892913-4	May 05, 2020; 978-1-9753-5910-2
3	Éclair Bleue: A Girls' Love Anthology That Resonates in Your Heart エクレア bleue あなたに響く百合アンソロジー	January 26, 2018; 978-4-04-893559-3	June 23, 2020; 978-1-9753-5907-2
4	Éclair Rouge: A Girls' Love Anthology That Resonates in Your Heart エクレア rouge あなたに響く百合アンソロジー	September 27, 2018; 978-4-04-912048-6	September 29, 2020; 978-1-9753-5913-3
Special	Eclair Special: Zassoutan: Yuikawa Kazuno Yuri Sakuhin Kessakusen (エクレアSpecial 好きなのは女の子 北尾タキ百合作品傑作選)	December 25, 2018; 978-4-04-912239-8	—
5	Éclair Orange: A Girls' Love Anthology That Resonates in Your Heart エクレア orange あなたに響く百合アンソロジー	November 27, 2019; 978-4-04-912866-6	November 17, 2020; 978-1-9753-1873-4
Special	エクレアSpecial 雑草譚 結川カズノ百合作品傑作選	March 26, 2020; 978-4-04-913108-6	—

== Reception ==
Anime News Network has given the series positive reviews. In their "Spring 2018 Manga Guide", Rebecca Silverman gave the first volume a 4 out of 5, noting that "most of the couples in the anthology have a strong element of friendship to their relationships is perhaps part of the appeal [...] It's a nice take on the romance genre, which so often relies on lust turning to love than beginning with an emotional bond." Amy McNulty gave the volume a 3.5 out of 5, concluding "there's no particular story that's likely to stick with the reader long after, but each makes an impact in its own way and there really isn't any major overlap in tone, setting, or circumstances within these pages." Éclair Blanche was given a 3.5 out of 5 by both Silverman and Faye Hopper, with Hopper remarking that "Éclair Blanche might be conventional yuri, but for the most part it is very good conventional yuri."
