= Nozomi Ōsaka =

Japanese animator

Nozomi Ōsaka (逢坂望美, Ōsaka Nozomi), also known as Non (のん, Non), is a Japanese animator. She is the illustrator of the light novel series Love, Chunibyo & Other Delusions, which was adapted into the anime television series of the same name.

== Works ==
- (as Nozomi Ōsaka) Love, Chunibyo & Other Delusions
- (as Non) Adachi to Shimamura
- (as Non) Nanana's Buried Treasure
