= Bloom Into You =

Japanese manga series and its franchise

- Cover of first manga volume, featuring Touko Nanami (left) and Yuu Koito (right).

やがて君になる (Yagate Kimi ni Naru)
- Genre: Yuri; Romance
- Manga
- Written by: Nio Nakatani
- Published by: ASCII Media Works
- English publisher: NA: Seven Seas Entertainment
- Magazine: Dengeki Daioh
- Original run: April 27, 2015 – September 27, 2019
- Volumes: 8
- Anime television series
- Directed by: Makoto Katō
- Produced by: Shinpei Yamashita; Tatsuya Kusunoki; Noritomo Isogai; Kaori Kimura; Mitsuhiro Ogata; Daisuke Iwasaki
- Written by: Jukki Hanada
- Music by: Michiru Ōshima
- Studio: Troyca
- Licensed by: Sentai Filmworks
- Original network: AT-X, Tokyo MX, SUN, KBS, TVA, TVQ, BS11
- Original run: October 5, 2018 – December 28, 2018
- Episodes: 13
- Light novel

Bloom Into You: Regarding Saeki Sayaka
- Written by: Hitoma Iruma
- Illustrated by: Nio Nakatani
- Published by: Kadokawa
- English publisher: NA: Seven Seas Entertainment
- Imprint: Dengeki Bunko
- Original run: November 10, 2018 – March 10, 2020
- Volumes: 3
- icon

Bloom Into You (Japanese: やがて君になる, Hepburn: Yagate Kimi ni Naru; lit. 'Eventually, Becoming You') is a Japanese yuri manga series written and illustrated by Nio Nakatani. The manga began serialization in the Japanese monthly shōnen manga magazine Dengeki Daioh on April 27, 2015, and ended on September 27, 2019. The story follows two female high school students, Yuu Koito and Touko Nanami, and the relationship that develops between them as they learn more about themselves through their experiences together.

Prior to creating Bloom Into You, Nakatani self-published various doujinshi works which featured girl-girl pairings of Touhou characters. Although she had not intended these works to be of the yuri genre, they were received as such by readers. This led her to be interested in producing a romance story featuring an unambiguous love between girls. A Dengeki Daioh editor approached Nakatani at a doujinshi convention, proposing that she draw a yuri series for the magazine, an offer which she accepted.

The manga was collected in eight tankōbon volumes that were first published in Japan between October 2015 and November 2019 by ASCII Media Works under the Dengeki Comics NEXT label. The volumes were later licensed for English release in North America by Seven Seas Entertainment, and were released between January 2017 and August 2020. An anime television series adaptation produced by Troyca and covering the first five volumes of the manga aired between October and December 2018. The anime is licensed in North America by Sentai Filmworks.

== Plot ==
First-year high school student Yuu Koito unexpectedly receives a confession from a middle school classmate. Feeling that she does not understand love, she turns him down. She later sees second-year student council member Touko Nanami turning down a confession, and becomes convinced that Touko feels similarly about romance. She approaches Touko and the two begin to bond, before Touko suddenly confesses feelings for Yuu, surprising her. Although Yuu does not feel capable of reciprocating, Touko is not bothered by this and says she would be very happy if Yuu were to not return her feelings.

Touko runs for the position of student council president and asks Yuu to be her campaign manager. To the dismay of Touko's best friend Sayaka Saeki, Yuu accepts the role. Touko expresses that she feels emotionally reliant on Yuu, as she is the only one to whom Touko can be vulnerable. Yuu decides to join the student council to support Touko, who ultimately wins the election.

As president, Touko plans to revive the student council play, which has not been performed in seven years. Yuu is against the idea, and chooses not to suggest her novelist friend Koyomi Kanou when the other members ask who could write it. Sayaka tells Yuu to solicit Koyomi's involvement and to look into the student council president of seven years ago. Yuu learns that Touko's older sister Mio was the student council president at that time and had been producing a play, but was killed in a traffic accident before its premiere. Yuu realizes that Touko is emulating her sister and wants to produce the play in her place. She tries to convince Touko that this is unnecessary, but Touko coldly refuses.

Koyomi finishes the first draft of the play. The narrative follows an amnesiac girl who must choose which person's view of her is her true self, with the original ending involving the girl choosing her lover's view. When the student council holds a study camp to practice for the play, actor Tomoyuki Ichigaya, a former classmate of Mio's, is brought in to help. From him, Touko learns that Mio was a very different person than who she is now, leaving her conflicted. Concerned, Yuu has Koyomi change the ending to have the protagonist choose to be herself instead of conforming to a specific person's view, believing that this will help Touko come to terms with herself. When the play is performed at the cultural festival, its narrative and Touko's performance are acclaimed by the audience, and the manager of a local theater troupe approaches Touko, asking her to join them and become an actress. She initially declines, but eventually reconsiders and accepts.

Touko thanks Yuu for her support and reiterates her wish for Yuu to stay with her as she is. However, Yuu has developed feelings for Touko, and abruptly confesses her love. She misinterprets Touko's shocked response as rejection and runs away. Touko realizes that her ultimatum that Yuu not fall in love with her has caused Yuu to repress herself. Meanwhile, Sayaka speaks with café owner Miyako Kodama, in whom she confides her own romantic feelings for Touko. When the second-years take a class trip to Kyoto, Sayaka formally confesses to Touko. Touko turns Sayaka down and acknowledges her love for Yuu. Although dejected, Sayaka accepts this. Elsewhere, Yuu realizes that she is running away from her problems. The two reconcile and Yuu finally openly reciprocates Touko's feelings.

Over time, Yuu and Touko become more emotionally and physically intimate with each other. This culminates when they go bowling together, with the agreement that whoever wins gets to make a request of the other. Yuu wins and asks to sleep over at Touko's house. Touko agrees, confessing she had wanted to arrange that as well. They spend the evening at Touko's parents' apartment, where they have sex for the first time.

Three years later, Yuu and Touko have enrolled in university and are now wearing rings on their fingers. They reunite with the former student council members to attend the cultural festival at their old high school. As Yuu and Touko reminisce about how their relationship started and reflect on their new lives as adults, they walk off into the night.

== Characters ==
Yuu Koito (小糸 侑, Koito Yū)
Voiced by: Hisako Kanemoto (manga PV), Yūki Takada (anime) (Japanese); Tia Ballard (English)
Yuu is a 15-year-old high school girl at Toomi Higashi High School who has trouble experiencing feelings of love. She finds it hard to refuse any requests asked upon her.
Touko Nanami (七海 燈子, Nanami Tōko)
Voiced by: Minako Kotobuki (manga PV, anime) (Japanese); Luci Christian (English)
Touko is a 16-year-old high school girl and the student council president. She had trouble experiencing feelings of love until she met Yuu. While on the outside she seems dependable and unshakable, she has hidden her fears and desires, especially when it comes to everyone else comparing her to her deceased sister. Yuu and Sayaka have deduced this, while only Yuu has seen her vulnerable side.
Sayaka Saeki (佐伯 沙弥香, Saeki Sayaka)
Voiced by: Ai Kayano (Japanese); Shanae'a Moore (English)
Sayaka is Touko's best friend since their first year of high school, and feels she knows Touko best. She is a second-year high school girl and the student council vice president. She is secretly in love with Touko, but keeps this to herself, unwilling to jeopardize their existing relationship. She decided that she was fine simply supporting her friend however she could.
Seiji Maki (槙 聖司, Maki Seiji)
Voiced by: Taichi Ichikawa (Japanese); Clint Bickham (English)
Seiji is a first-year high school boy and a member of the student council. He grew up surrounded by two older sisters and a younger sister, so he finds it easy to talk with girls.
Suguru Doujima (堂島 卓, Dōjima Suguru)
Voiced by: Shō Nogami (Japanese); Greg Cote (English)
Doujima is a first-year high school boy and a member of the student council.
Koyomi Kanou (叶 こよみ, Kanō Koyomi)
Voiced by: Konomi Kohara (Japanese); Brittney Karbowski (English)
Koyomi is Yuu's classmate and friend from middle school. She wants to become a writer.
Akari Hyuuga (日向 朱里, Hyūga Akari)
Voiced by: Yuka Terasaki (Japanese); Amber Lee Connors (English)
Akari is Yuu's classmate and friend from middle school. She is a member of the basketball club.
Riko Hakozaki (箱崎 理子, Hakozaki Riko)
Voiced by: Mai Nakahara (Japanese); Patricia Duran (English)
Hakozaki is a literature teacher and the student council's staff advisor.
Miyako Kodama (児玉 都, Kodama Miyako)
Voiced by: Nanako Mori (Japanese); Samantha Stevens (English)
Miyako is the manager of a café that the student council members frequent. She is in a relationship with Riko Hakozaki and the two of them live in an apartment together.
Rei Koito (小糸 怜, Koito Rei)
Voiced by: Mikako Komatsu (Japanese); Marissa Lenti (English)
Rei is Yuu's older sister who attends university. She has a boyfriend, Hiro, who visits the family regularly. She likes to bake. She also seems to realize there is something between Yuu and Touko.
Tomoyuki Ichigaya (市ヶ谷 知雪, Ichigaya Tomoyuki)
Voiced by: Kazuyuki Okitsu (Japanese); Blake Shepard (English)
Tomoyuki is a professional actor who was a classmate of Mio Nanami seven years ago.
Chie Yuzuki (柚木 千枝, Yuzuki Chie)
Voiced by: Sayaka Senbongi (Japanese) (Note: Credited as "Senpai" (「先輩」))
Sayaka's ex-girlfriend and senpai from middle school, who initially confesses to and forms a relationship with her which she later breaks off, saying that it was "just a phase" and that they cannot have a relationship as two girls. In the manga and anime, Chie is not named and only referred to as "senpai" by Sayaka, but is named in the Regarding Saeki Sayaka novels.

== Production ==
=== Background ===
A page from a Touhou Project-based doujinshi created by Nakatani, featuring characters Ran Yakumo and Yukari Yakumo sharing a same-sex kiss

Prior to creating the series, Nio Nakatani was mainly known for her work on doujinshi, especially those based on the Touhou Project series. Because her works were primarily about relationships between girls (which Nakatani attributed to the Touhou series' almost entirely female cast), she gained a reputation as an author of yuri manga. This surprised Nakatani, as she had not intentionally set out to write yuri nor considered her works as such, and she said that she had primarily sought to depict complex human relationships that interested her. However, as she nonetheless was interested in the yuri genre, she became interested in drawing an unambiguous love story between girls.

When Tatsuya Kusunoki, an editor of the manga magazine Dengeki Daioh (in which Nakatani had professionally debuted with her previously self-published short story Farewell to My Alter) approached Nakatani at a doujinshi convention, asking if she wanted to draw a yuri series for the magazine, Nakatani accepted the offer. Kusunoki stated that he had always enjoyed yuri manga and had wanted to produce one. He said that as Dengeki Daioh had not previously featured a similar girls' love story, it was uncertain whether such a proposal would be accepted. The editor-in-chief ultimately approved of the idea, which Kusunoki attributed to the publication's "open-minded" culture and the magazine's financial resources.

Regarding her approach to the yuri genre, Nakatani stated that while she liked romance stories, she was disappointed with narratives that painted a relationship as necessary to complete oneself emotionally, as it made her feel as if "something was wrong with me." Nakatani felt that same-sex romances often avoided this dichotomy, and that as she struggled to write a convincing heterosexual romance, she was more drawn towards creating manga about same-sex couples. While Nakatani had also drawn boys' love manga previously, she found yuri more interesting, since she wanted to draw cute girls. In one interview, she said that yuri was difficult to define, but that "once the reader thinks it is yuri, then at that moment it becomes yuri." In a conversation with Riddle Story of Devil creators Yun Kōga and Sunao Minakata, she concurred with Kōga's statement that yuri is about "girls getting involved with other girls," adding the qualification that it is "feelings between girls." She also cited the anime adaptation of Sound! Euphonium as an influence, saying it showed "everything I want to do in yuri."

=== Early development ===
Nio Nakatani's early character designs for Touko and Yuu

Besides the work being in the yuri genre, Nakatani had not decided on any story details before accepting Kusunoki's offer. She developed many ideas for different plots and characters, almost all of which were ultimately scrapped, except for Touko's character design. The editor-in-chief suggested a "secret love", which Nakatani noticed was common to the yuri genre in stories where the characters had to keep their same-sex relationship secret due to both being girls. Nakatani did not want to focus the narrative on the social challenges of girl-girl relationships, as she felt it would be too simple, and was more interested in exploring the characters' personal flaws. Thus, she thought of a twist on the idea, where rather than keeping their love secret from others, drama would come from two girls keeping their love secret from each other. This became the impetus for what would become Yuu and Touko's romance story.

Kusunoki proposed a "light and dark" yuri story to Nakatani, where a "dark" lead character would be in some way redeemed by the "light" character, as this was a dynamic seen in other yuri manga he had previously enjoyed. Touko was created first as the "dark" half of the pairing while Yuu was made to fill the "light" role. Nakatani wanted Touko to be attractive but "troublesome," and designed her to appear superficially perfect, while in reality being a difficult person with deep emotional insecurities and self-hatred, who would confess her love but not wish to be reciprocated. From there, Nakatani developed Yuu as the type of girl who she imagined would be able to help and eventually come to love Touko.

Yuu was intended to visually and temperamentally contrast with Touko, as a deliberately cute girl with a deeper "cool" aspect. Her personality was written to be someone who would not feel happy about Touko's love but also not reject her, which led to her being created as a girl who desired romantic feelings but did not understand them. As they were planning the characters, Kusunoki and Nakatani asked others around them for stories about their experiences with romance. One woman said that she did not understand romantic feelings, and Nakatani based the manga's depiction of Yuu's emotions on her story. Once Touko's role as the student council president was decided, Nakatani conceived Sayaka, Touko's friend in the student council, who would have an unrequited crush on Touko. Nakatani wanted Sayaka to come off as "extremely cool", and designed her to contrast with Touko's "lovable" image when standing beside her as her student council vice president and academic rival.

In devising the setting, Nakatani opted to set Bloom Into You in a co-ed school environment, as opposed to other yuri manga which often opted for all-girls school settings. This was because she felt that including male characters in whom Touko did not take any interest established Touko's attraction to girls as a unique individual trait that set her apart from other girls. Nakatani accounted for readers potentially expecting that Yuu or Touko would later end up in a heterosexual relationship, and thus introduced the male characters in ways which clearly precluded this possibility (such as them already having girlfriends).

Maki, a major supporting male character who takes interest in Yuu's relationship with Touko and offers her advice, is depicted as not being interested in relationships himself. He was intended as a foil to Yuu, as while he did not feel romantic feelings, he was happy despite not feeling them. This aspect of his character also served to preclude him as a potential romantic interest for Yuu or Touko. Nakatani included Maki to show that people could feel fulfilled without romantic relationships. The anime's character designer, Hiroaki Gōda, felt that while he could not directly relate to the story's female cast, he could identify with Maki's desire to watch Yuu and Touko's relationship develop. The adult lesbian couple of Riko and Miyako were introduced to suggest what Yuu and Touko's relationship would possibly become. The designs of many of the central characters were decided upon before the manga started its serialization.

=== Serialization ===
Nakatani and Kusunoki wanted to make the characters' emotions understandable even to readers who may not be able to relate to them. It was particularly important for the story's female characters to be enjoyable to Dengeki Daioh's shōnen demographic. They tried to not shy away from emotionally complex characters, believing that if they were depicted successfully, it would lead to a more fulfilling story. Kusunoki said that this was a challenge, but felt that Nakatani was capable of accomplishing it.

In planning Bloom Into You's story, Nakatani paced the series such that there was always a dramatic plot twist at the end of each volume. For instance, she deliberately avoided showing Touko's perspective until chapter 10 of the manga, which was placed at the end of the second tankōbon volume. She felt it served as an ideal climax for the end of that volume, being a critical point where the nature of her relationship with Yuu was solidified. In response to Happy Sugar Life editor Katsuyuki Sasaki saying that this had "turned the story upside down", Kusunoki commented that it enabled readers to reread the previous chapters in a new light, and said that the series "really starts" from that point. As Nakatani felt that it was important to not let the characters change too quickly, she tried to keep in mind what she felt that they were likely to do at the point to which she had developed them.

The spinoff novels, which focus on Sayaka as a central protagonist, were written by Hitoma Iruma, whom Nakatani had previously collaborated with on Iruma's earlier novel Shoujo Mousouchuu. Although she was initially apprehensive about someone else writing her characters, she agreed when it was decided that Iruma would be the writer. Nakatani provided Iruma with details about her planned ending for the series. Among these details, Nakatani wrote dialogue for a conversation where Yuu and Touko learn that Sayaka has a girlfriend, which would be included in the final chapter of the manga. Iruma chose to begin the novel with Sayaka in elementary school, as he did not feel confident that her middle school experience would be enough to support a full novel, and thus imagined a history for her based on the few details given about her past in the manga. He said that as Nakatani was the original creator, he felt that his role in the novels' creation was "the one who contributed the text".

Following the release of the novels, Nakatani said that Iruma's writing had influenced how she wrote Sayaka, particularly her confession to Touko in the 37th chapter. Rather than discarding her understanding of the character due to Iruma's influence, his characterization instead aligned with her own view. Although it was planned early that Sayaka would eventually confess and be rejected, her character grew to be more detailed as the series went on, and she became much more involved in the narrative than Nakatani had initially planned. In writing the conclusion of her subplot, Nakatani wanted to avoid implying that her rejection meant she had "failed", saying that Touko could have never accepted her confession even if she had confessed earlier in the story. She rewrote the dialogue of Sayaka's confession scene several times.

In the final volume, Nakatani wanted to write a complete ending to the story which would leave readers feeling that they had seen all that was needed to be seen, make the nature of Yuu and Touko's feelings unambiguously clear, and assure readers that their relationship would last. She wanted to avoid giving the impression that Yuu and Touko were destined to be together, instead emphasizing that they had freely chosen a relationship after they both had changed and were able to love each other. The 44th chapter, in which Yuu and Touko have sex, was considered necessary, as Nakatani felt that it was best to not omit that aspect of their feelings for each other. In the final epilogue chapter set three years after the previous chapter following a timeskip, their relationship is no longer a secret from most of their friends, which Nakatani preferred as she wanted them to be happy at the story's conclusion. Touko also continues pursuing her acting career, which Nakatani decided on as she "didn't want to condemn" the time in Touko's life when she was emulating her sister. Nakatani cited the works of Satoshi Mizukami, particularly his manga Lucifer and the Biscuit Hammer, as an influence on the final chapter.

=== Anime adaptation ===
==== Planning ====
Before the anime adaptation was greenlit, Kadokawa sent director Makoto Kato several titles that it was publishing, asking if he would be interested in directing an anime version of any of them. Among these was Bloom Into You, which caught Kato's interest more than any of the others and resulted in him asking that an anime adaptation be considered. While Kato did not typically read manga except when required to in the course of his work, he was attracted to Nakatani's panel layouts, which he said were "very similar to how things are done in film". Kato felt that an adaptation would fit his style as a director. He admitted that he did not have any previous knowledge of the yuri genre, but nonetheless was intrigued by the story and saw potential in it for broad appeal, even to those who were not already fans of yuri. Kato believed that bringing his perspective as an outsider made the anime more interesting, as he imagined that someone more familiar with the genre would produce something with more limited appeal.

Kato had previously worked as an assistant director for Re:Creators, and debuted in the lead directorial role on the anime adaptation of Beautiful Bones: Sakurako's Investigation, which Nakatani had seen prior. As Beautiful Bones' source material was a novel series, Kato had not had to adhere to pre-existing visuals, and he described working on a manga adaptation as a challenge for this reason. While Nakatani was confident in Kato's skill as a director, she was nervous about letting others handle her story, as she was uncertain if she would be involved. Kato assured Nakatani that he cared about the original manga and wanted to create a faithful adaptation, assuaging her concerns. Nakatani was consulted extensively during the production of the anime, attending the recording sessions and script meetings as well as supervising the visuals, character design, and storyboards. Kato considered her opinion important due to the story's complexity. Nakatani explained her intentions with several scenes and characters to ensure that they were accurate, and provided her envisioned chronology of the story's events. She also contributed new details not directly shown in the manga, such as the earlier draft of the Student Council play prior to Yuu's request that Koyomi revise it. Nakatani felt that her input helped the anime more closely reflect her original work, a feat which she regarded as remarkable.

==== Script ====
Series composition writer Jukki Hanada joined the project after being asked by a producer if he would be interested. In reading the manga, Hanada felt it would be difficult to adapt, but decided to accept the offer as he felt an anime would be worthwhile. Nakatani was already a fan of Hanada's work, and quickly placed her trust in him. Prior to writing the scripts, he discussed his interpretation of the story with Nakatani, saying he read it as "a simple love story" between women with a minimized focus on homoeroticism, and that it was not concerned with avoiding the "associations with 'immorality'" often found in other yuri works. Hanada said that his reading "wasn't far off" from Nakatani's own opinion. Hanada felt most connected to Touko, as he related to her feelings of self-hatred, while Kato identified with Yuu. Hanada opined that this contributed to the success of their collaboration, as they did not clash with one another over how to portray either character.

In writing the scripts, several minor changes were made, such as changing certain lines of dialogue and the order in which some scenes were presented, in order to better pace the story as a television anime. There were also some additions, such as the expanded dialogue of Yuu's student council speech, written by Hanada. Nonetheless, no major alterations were made, as Hanada and Kato wished for the anime to fit within the manga's established continuity. At one point Nakatani suggested an anime-original ending, but this was decided against to allow viewers to transition into the manga and leave the door open for a continuation. The anime was initially planned to end with the events of the fourth volume. Hanada and Kato considered ending it after the student council play, but felt that doing so would make the anime "only about Touko," and as such decided against this as they wanted both Yuu and Touko to be the focus. At the time of writing the script, the chapter where Yuu and Touko visit an aquarium together had not yet been published, but Nakatani presented the plans for that chapter to Hanada, and they agreed to make it the ending of the anime. The anime's version of the aquarium date scene was significantly expanded from its manga counterpart, featuring additional details contributed by Nakatani.

==== Visuals ====
Before the opening theme was commissioned, Kato had already clearly envisioned the opening and ending animation's visuals. With the approval of producer Shinpei Yamashita, Kato began drawing the opening animation's storyboards before the song was received. Kato intended the opening, which he described as reflecting the "dual nature" of the characters, to feel similar to a music video, particularly its setting's confinement to a single location. He chose to include visuals of flowers blooming within the school as he felt this would make for impactful imagery and allow for inserting significant symbolism, particularly through the use of flower language. The ending animation, which Kato described as simpler and more straightforward, was based on an illustration from a cell phone case that was sold as merchandise for the manga. The upbeat tone of the ending theme "hectopascal" was chosen to "reset [the viewers'] feelings", leaving them happy and eager to see the next episode rather than anxious about the plot's development. The more heavy and emotional tone of the opening was chosen to contrast with this choice.

In creating the anime's character designs, Hiroaki Gōda described evoking Nakatani's art as a significant challenge. Kato advised him to "avoid a cookie-cutter look". As he was not well-versed in "modern styles of art", he spent several months polishing his versions of the characters, but felt they still fell short of the detail seen in Nakatani's art. When drawing his cuts of the animation, he did not consult his own character design sheets, instead always referring to Nakatani's original drawings. Gōda stated that while drawing Yuu was "straightforward", Touko's expressions were more challenging due to her being "two-faced". He commented that the scenes "when they are thinking something, but don't let that reflect on their face" were particularly difficult to draw as it was necessary to convey the desired emotion without using their expressions to plainly depict it. Sayaka was considered difficult to draw as well, as Gōda felt he would often "fail to draw her with the proper air of royalty". However, he noted Sayaka's expressions in two specific scenes—when she confronts Yuu in the sixth episode, and when she dismisses her ex-girlfriend in the eighth episode— as being "really fun".

==== Music ====
The anime's musical score, composed by Michiru Ōshima, was written with the general intention of creating "something that should sparkle." The musical arrangement was limited to the use of piano, string, and woodwind instruments, and as such, Ōshima opted to create a chamber music score. The score was recorded at a New York-based music studio to produce a "fresh and sharp" sound. Although she wanted to elicit a "psychological response" in viewers, Ōshima did not want to project an overwhelming "gloomy" mood. 35 tracks were ordered for the score.

==== Impact on the series ====
There were several additions in the anime that Nakatani enjoyed, such as Yuu's student council election speech. The anime features several instances of Yuu depicted underwater as a visual metaphor, including one specific sequence from the beginning of the first episode where she reaches out through the water. As Nakatani particularly liked this imagery, she drew a similar image as the opening page of the 34th chapter of the manga. Additionally, the 39th chapter was influenced by the lyrics of the anime's ending theme.

== Media ==
=== Manga ===
The manga is written and illustrated by Nio Nakatani. It began serialization in ASCII Media Works' monthly magazine Dengeki Daioh on April 27, 2015 and ended on September 27, 2019. The eighth and final tankōbon volume of the manga was released in November 2019. Describing the series as having "adorable artwork and [a] charming love story", Seven Seas Entertainment announced its licensing of the manga for English release in North America on February 14, 2016. The manga is currently published in Japanese, English, Korean, Traditional Chinese, Simplified Chinese, Thai, French, Italian, German, Spanish and Vietnamese.

The manga was relaunched as a full-color webtoon by Kadokawa Future Publishing's Tatesuku Comic imprint. It began serialization on BookWalker on August 11, 2021.

| No. | Title | Original release date | English release date |
|---|---|---|---|
| 1 | I Think I Might Be Falling in Love with You... Suki o shiranai shōjo ga deau, hitosujinawade wa ikanai ── on'nanoko dōshi no ren'ai (好きを知らない少女が出会う、一筋縄ではいかない──女の子同士の恋愛) | October 27, 2015; 978-4-04-865432-6 | January 3, 2017; 978-1-626923-53-9 |
1. "I Cannot Reach the Stars" (私は星に届かない, Watashi wa hoshi ni todokanai); 2. "First Blush" (発熱, Hatsunetsu); 3. "Campaigning for Love" (初恋申請, Hatsukoi shinsei); 4. "Atmospheric Pressure" (まだ大気圏, Mada taikiken); 5. "The One Who Loves Me" (私を好きな人, Watashi o sukinahito)
| 2 | Only Time Can Tell... Watashi ni suki wa, otozurenai (わたしに好きは、訪れない) | April 27, 2016; 978-4-04-865875-1 | May 16, 2017; 978-1-626924-79-6 |
6. "A Kiss is Just a Kiss" (好きとキスの距離, Suki to kisu no kyori); 7. "I'm Not an Actress" (役者じゃない, Yakusha janai); Interlude: "Reading Too Much into Books" (深読み書店, Fuka yomi shoten); 8. "Multiple Choice" (選択間題, Sentaku-kan dai); 9. "Multiple Choice (Continued)" (続・選択間題, Zoku・sentaku-kan dai); Interlude: "Before Dawn" (夜明け前のこと, Yoake mae no koto); 10. "Lock Away My Words" (言葉は閉じ込めて, Kotoba wa tojikomete); Episode X: "Locked Away By Words" (言葉で閉じ込めて, Kotoba de tojikomete)
| 3 | Never Say Never; Kono mama de itai. Hontoda yo. (このままでいたい。ほんとだよ。) | November 26, 2016; 978-4-04-892431-3 | September 19, 2017; 978-1-626925-44-1 |
11. "So Many Secrets" (秘密のたくさん, Himitsu no takusan); 12. "Spark" (種火, Tanebi); Interlude: "Big Sister's Perspective" (その頃のお姉ちゃん, Sonokoro no o nēchan); 13. "Downpour" (降り籠める, Ori komeru); 14. "Point of Intersection" (交点, Kōten); Interlude: "Senpai, Kouhai, Kouhai's Kouhai" (先輩、後輩、その後輩, Senpai, kōhai, sono kōhai); 15. "In Position" (位置について, Ichi ni tsuite); 16. "I Cannot Hear the Signal Gun" (号砲は聞こえない, Gōhō wa kikoenai)
| 4 | Practice Makes Perfect; Wagamamada. Anata mo, watashi mo. (わがままだ。あなたも、わたしも。) | June 27, 2017; 978-4-04-892919-6 | February 20, 2018; 978-1-626926-84-4 |
17. "Less Than Me" (私未満, Watashi-miman); 18. "Stars in Daytime" (昼の星, Hiru no hoshi); "So Much for First Love" (初恋はいらない, Hatsukoi wa iranai); 19. "Mirage" (逃げ水, Nigemizu); 20. "The Centre of the Triangle" (三角形の重心, Sankakkei no jūshin); 21. "Fuse" (導火, Dōka); 22. "Can't Even Breathe" (気が付けば息もできない, Kigatsukeba ikimodekinai)
| 5 | Going Out! Kokode wanai basho e (ここではない場所へ) | January 27, 2018; 978-4-04-893541-8 | August 14, 2018; 978-1-626928-02-2 |
Interlude: "Past, Present, & Beyond" (これまでとこれから, Kore made to korekara); 23. "Until the Last Stop" (終着駅まで, Shūchakueki made); 24. "Lighthouse" (灯台, Tōdai); 25. "Expectation & Reality" (憧れの着地点, Akogareno ki chiten); 26. "Costar" (共演者, Kyōen-sha); 27. "One Fear" (怖いものひとつ, Kowaimono hitotsu); 28. "Wish" (願い事, Negaigoto)
| 6 | The Curtains Rise... Senpai wa mou, daijoubu da ne. (先輩はもう、大丈夫だね。) | September 27, 2018; 978-4-04-912047-9 | March 26, 2019; 978-1-626929-41-8 |
29. "The Curtain Rises" (開幕, Kaimaku); 30. "First Act" (前篇, Zenpen); 31. "Second Act" (後篇, Kōhen); 32. "Beneath the Stage" (舞台の下で, Butai no shita de); 33. "Running Start" (助走, Josō); 34. "Overflow" (零れる, Koboreru)
| 7 | A Change of Heart; Gakkō ni nokoru Yū wa, suki ga wakarazu ni... ... . (学校に残る侑は、好きがわからずに......。) | April 26, 2019; 978-4-04-912493-4 | April 7, 2020; 978-1-642750-20-1 |
35. "The Two, Alone" (一人と一人, Hitori to hitori); 36. "When Someday Comes"いつかの明日 (Itsuka no ashita); Interlude: "Comparing Answers" (答え合わせ中, Kotae-awase-chū); 37. "Ignite" (灯す, Tomosu); 38. "Direction" (針路, Shinro); 39. "In the Light" (光の中にいる, Hikari no naka ni iru)
| 8 | Love in Full Bloom; Suki o shiranai shōjo-tachi no koi monogatari, saishū maki. (好きを知らない少女たちの恋物語、最終巻。) | November 27, 2019; 978-4-04-912869-7 | August 18, 2020; 978-1-64275-746-0 |
40. "The Person I Love" (わたしの好きな人, Watashi no sukinahito); 41. "Uncharted Waters" (海図は白紙, Kaizu wa hakushi); 42. "Essay Question" (記述問題, Kijutsumondai); 43. "Essay Question, Continued" (続・ 記述問題, Zoku kijutsumondai); 44. "Dusk and Dawn" (夜と朝, Yoru to asa); 45. "Voyage" (船路, Funaji)

==== Anthology ====
Two volumes of an official manga anthology were published by Kadokawa and released between December 2018 and March 2020. Seven Seas announced its licensing of the manga anthology for English release in North America on December 4, 2020.

| No. | Original release date | Original ISBN | English release date | English ISBN |
|---|---|---|---|---|
| 1 | December 25, 2018 | 978-4049122381 | September 28, 2021 | 978-1-64827-788-7 |
"Will I Ever Bloom into You?" (やがて君になれるかな?, Yagate kimi ni nareru ka na?); "A Different Pattern of Stars" (或いはそんな星模様, Aruiwa son'na hoshi moyō); "Free-Floating Maidens" (ふわつき乙女, Fuwa tsuki otome); "Onigir, Croquettes, Rolled Eggs" (おにぎりコロッケたまご焼き, Onigiri korokke tama go yaki); "Little Senpai" (ちいさな先輩, Chiīsana senpai); "In the Box" (インザボックス, Inza bokkusu); "The Night of the Festival" (まつりの夜に, Matsuri no yoru ni); "Let's Write a Script!" (きゃくほんをつくろう!, Kyaku hon o tsukurou!); "What Will You Wear with Your Smile Tomorrow? (あなたは明日何着て笑う, Anata wa ashita nanin chaku te warau); "Bitter Coffee Time" (ビ夕ーコー匕ータイム, Bi yū ̄kō bǐ taimu); "Let's Play Cards with Senpai!" (先輩たちとあそぼう!, Senpai tachi to asobo u!); "Student Council Secret" (ヒミツの生徒会, Himitsu no seito kai); "Fleeting Cherry Blossoms" (徒桜, Adazakura)
| 2 | March 26, 2020 | 978-4049131130 | January 18, 2022 | 978-1-64827-789-4 |
"The Winds of Change" (風と共に来る, Kaze to tomoni kuru); "Us, Games, and the Future" (ふたりとゲームとこれから, Futari to gēmu to korekara); "The Gap Between Us" (君との間隔, Kimi to no kankaku); "Her Choice" (彼女の選択, Kanojo no sentaku); "Riddle Me This, Koyomi-chan!" (謎解きだよ! こよみちゃん, Nazotokida yo! Koyomi-chan); "Musical Chairs" (椅子取りゲーム, Isu tori gēmu); "Six Years Later, Still by Your Side" (6年になると後もあなたの隣で, 6-toshi ni naru to nochi mo anata no tonari de); "Ode to Fallen Leaves" (落葉讚頌, Rakuyō zàn sòng); Lies and True; "Unfair" (ずるい, Zurui); "Touching!" (かんげき!, Kan geki!); "Shining in Your Light" (君を浴びて光る, Kimi o abite hikaru); "A 45-Day Couple" (45日差カップルなので, 45 hizashi kappurunanode)

=== Novel ===
A spinoff novel, Bloom Into You: Regarding Saeki Sayaka (やがて君になる 佐伯沙弥香について, Yagate Kimi ni Naru: Saeki Sayaka ni Tsuite), is written by Hitoma Iruma and was published through Kadokawa's Dengeki Bunko imprint beginning November 10, 2018. The second volume was released on May 10, 2019, and the third volume was released on March 10, 2020. Seven Seas Entertainment announced in July 2019 that they had licensed the series for release in English in North America.

| No. | Original release date | Original ISBN | English release date | English ISBN |
|---|---|---|---|---|
| 1 | November 10, 2018 | 978-4-04-912165-0 | December 19, 2019 (digital); February 11, 2020 (physical) | 978-1-64275-754-5 |
"Saeki Sayaka: Year 5, Group 3" (5年3組 佐伯沙弥香, 5-nen 3-kumi, Saeki Sayaka); "Saeki Sayaka: Class 2-C, Tomosumi Girls' Academy" (友澄女子中学校2- C 佐伯沙弥香, Tomosumi joshi chūgakkō 2-C, Saeki Sayaka)
| 2 | May 10, 2019 | 978-4-04-912518-4 | April 23, 2020 (digital); August 11, 2020 (physical) | 978-1-64505-462-7 |
"Love, Me, and Yuu" (恋と、小糸, Koi to, Koito); "Parallel Lines" (平行線, Heikōsen); "Like the Distant Skies" (空の彼方みたいに, Sora no kanata mitai ni)
| 3 | March 10, 2020 | 978-4-04-913129-1 | December 22, 2020 | 978-1-64505-727-7 |
"Moored Ship" (停泊船, Teihaku-sen); "The Clear Sea" (透明の海, Tōmei no umi); "Settling Sail" (抜錨, Batsubyō); "The Stars Waver" (星が揺れる, Hoshi ga yureru)

=== Anime ===
A 13-episode anime television series adaptation was announced in the June issue of the Dengeki Daioh magazine on April 27, 2018. It was animated by Troyca, produced by Kadokawa, Docomo Anime Store, AT-X, Sony Music Solutions and Kadokawa Media House and directed by Makoto Katō, with Jukki Hanada handling series composition, Hiroaki Gōda designing the characters and Michiru Ōshima composing the music. The opening theme is "Kimi ni Furete" (君にふれて, Touched By You) by Riko Azuna, while the ending theme is "hectopascal" by Yuu Koito (Yūki Takada) and Touko Nanami (Minako Kotobuki). The series aired in Japan from October 5 to December 28, 2018. Sentai Filmworks licensed the series outside of Asia and streamed it on Hidive in both subtitled and English dubbed formats. Sentai also released the series on DVD and Blu-ray in September 2019, while MVM Films published the series on home video in the UK. KSM Anime released the series on DVD and Blu-ray with a German dub.

| No. | Title (Note: All English titles are taken from Hidive.) | Directed by | Original release date |
|---|---|---|---|
| 1 | "I Can't Reach the Star"; Transliteration: "Watashi wa Hoshi ni Todokanai" (Japanese: わたしは星に届かない) | Makoto Katō | October 5, 2018 |
Asked to help out with her school's student council, Yuu Koito comes across student council member Touko Nanami turning down a confession, stating she does not intend to go out with anyone. Recalling a confession from a boy she had yet to reply to, Yuu confides in Touko about feelings she did not understand. After helping her turn down the boy properly, Touko tells Yuu that she has fallen in love with her. Later, Touko asks Yuu to be her campaign manager for the student council president election.
| 2 | "Heating Up / Application for First Love"; Transliteration: "Hatsunetsu / Hatsukoi Shinsei" (Japanese: 発熱 / 初恋申請) | Shū Watanabe | October 12, 2018 |
Touko's decision to make Yuu her campaign manager does not settle well with her long-time friend Sayaka Saeki, but Sayaka decides to help Yuu nonetheless. Later, as Yuu states she is not the type to fall in love, Touko suddenly kisses her. As attentions turn to the campaign, Yuu notices that Touko really thinks of her as special, and becomes jealous that she cannot experience the same feeling. Noticing this, Touko asks Yuu to let her be in love with her without Yuu falling in love with her in return, which Yuu agrees to.
| 3 | "Still Up In The Air / The One Who Likes Me"; Transliteration: "Mada Taikiken / Watashi o Suki na Hito" (Japanese: まだ大気圏 / わたしを好きな人) | Geisei Morita | October 19, 2018 |
During school break, Yuu meets up with some of her friends from middle school, one of which was turned down by her crush. On the day of the student council elections, Touko reveals to Yuu that she is nervous about remaining perfect in everyone's eyes and scared of reverting to the person she used to be, but Yuu assures her that it is fine to show her weakness to her. Despite being nervous herself, Yuu manages to pull off her campaign speech while also announcing her intention to join the student council, resulting in Touko winning the election.
| 4 | "The Distance Between Fondness and Kisses / Not One of the Characters"; Transliteration: "Suki to Kisu no Kyori / Yakusha janai" (Japanese: 好きとキスの距離 / 役者じゃない) | Masatoyo Takada | October 26, 2018 |
Touko reveals that she wants to revive a tradition where the student council would hold a stage play during the culture festival. Later, fellow student council member Seiji Maki spots Touko and Yuu kissing. After confronting Yuu about it, Maki, who prefers observing the romance of others, agrees not to tell Touko or anyone else about what he saw, hinting to Yuu that she may actually love Touko more than she realizes.
| 5 | "The Problem with Choices"; Transliteration: "Sentaku Mondai / Zoku Sentaku Mondai" (Japanese: 選択問題 / 続・選択問題) | Kōhei Hatano | November 2, 2018 |
While in denial about what Maki implied, Yuu is asked by her classmate Koyomi Kanou to give her feedback on a novel that she is writing. Later, Yuu invites Touko to her house to study, where Touko worries about how Yuu feels about her before exchanging contacts with her sister Rei.
| 6 | "Words Kept Repressed / Words Used to Repress"; Transliteration: "Kotoba wa Tojikome / Kotoba de Tojikomete" (Japanese: 言葉は閉じ込めて / 言葉で閉じ込めて) | Shū Watanabe | November 9, 2018 |
As the student council look for someone to write a script for their play, Sayaka approaches Yuu, who had Koyomi in mind but did not bring it up out of concern for Touko, and tells her to look into the student council president of seven years ago. Unable to find any relevant documents from seven years ago, Yuu learns from both Rei and one of the teachers that the president back then was Touko's older sister, Mio, who died in a traffic accident before she could perform at the culture festival. Realizing that Touko has been trying to imitate her sister, Yuu tries to convince her not to force herself to do the play, but Touko refuses, feeling she cannot let go of what makes people consider her as someone special. Stating that she cannot fall in love with either side of Touko, Yuu promises to stay by her side and help with the play. Later, while walking together, Touko thinks about how she never wants Yuu to change, because she fears if Yuu does then Touko would not love her anymore and go back to being lonely. As such, Touko hopes Yuu will never fall in love with her.
| 7 | "Secrets Galore / Sparks"; Transliteration: "Himitsu no Takusan / Tanebi" (Japanese: 秘密のたくさん / 種火) | Hayato Sakai | November 16, 2018 |
Sayaka recalls how she dated a girl in middle school, only to find that she was not taking it seriously, after which she fell for Touko. As Yuu, Touko, Sayaka, and Koyomi get together at a café to discuss the play, Sayaka notices something between her teacher Riko Hakozaki and café owner Miyako Kodama. Speaking to Miyako alone, Sayaka learns that she and Riko are dating each other and confides with her about her feelings for Touko.
| 8 | "Intersection / Rained In"; Transliteration: "Kōten / Ori Komeru" (Japanese: 交点 / 降り籠める) | Geisei Morita | November 23, 2018 |
While waiting for Touko, Sayaka has a brief run-in with her ex-girlfriend, managing to say her piece to her. Later, as the student council prepare to take part in a competitive relay event, Yuu spends some time with Sayaka to hear her thoughts on both the play and Touko. On a rainy day, Yuu ends up walking home with Touko, who becomes wary of Yuu showing affection towards her.
| 9 | "On Your Marks / The Unheard Start Signal"; Transliteration: "Ichi ni Tsuite / Gōhō wa Kikoenai" (Japanese: 位置について / 号砲は聞こえない) | Masatoyo Takada | November 30, 2018 |
While preparing for Sports Day, Touko brings Yuu into the sports supply closet to kiss her, asking for a kiss from her in return at the end of the day. On the appointed day, Maki tells Yuu that he does not have romantic feelings towards anyone, preferring to watch other romances from a distance. Yuu expresses that she feels similarly, but Maki notices she does not feel exactly the same way. At the end of the day, as Touko claims her reward, Yuu starts to become aware of her own feelings towards her.
| 10 | "The Incomplete Me / Midday Star / Mirage"; Transliteration: "Watashi-miman / Hiru no Hoshi / Nigemizu" (Japanese: 私未満 / 昼の星 / 逃げ水) | Shū Watanabe | December 7, 2018 |
Koyomi finishes her first draft of the play script, which centers around a girl with amnesia having to choose which person's interpretation of her is her true self. As the student council make plans for a study camp to rehearse for the play, Yuu goes shopping with her middle school friend Natsuki, who notices how Yuu has changed. Meanwhile, Touko remains obsessed with the idea of becoming Mio.
| 11 | "Centroid of the Triangle / Lit Fuse"; Transliteration: "Sankakkei no Jūshin / Dōka" (Japanese: 三角形の重心 / 導火) | Kana Kawana | December 14, 2018 |
The student council begin their study camp, with Koyomi having concerns over whether the ending she chose for the play is the right one. On the second day, Tomoyuki Ichigaya, a former classmate of Mio, is brought in to coach the students. Upon asking Tomoyuki about what kind of person Mio was like, Touko is shocked to learn that the person he knew is different from the person she thought she was.
| 12 | "Suddenly Suffocating"; Transliteration: "Kigatsukeba Iki mo Dekinai" (Japanese: 気が付けば息も出来ない) | Shū Watanabe | December 21, 2018 |
As the camp draws to a close, Yuu grows more concerned about Touko's behavior. Following the camp, Yuu invites Touko to her room and learns of Touko's worries about what Tomoyuki told her about Mio. Wanting Touko to stop hating herself, Yuu decides to ask Koyomi to rewrite the ending of the play in order to change Touko.
| 13 | "To The Last Stop / Lighthouse"; Transliteration: "Shūchaku Eki Made / Tōdai" (Japanese: 終着駅まで / 灯台) | Makoto Katō | December 28, 2018 |
While Yuu and Koyomi work on the new script, Sayaka asks Touko about what she personally knew about Mio. Later, Yuu and Touko go to an aquarium together, where Touko talks about her feelings for her. Deciding to rehearse the play with her, Yuu indirectly tells Touko that she does not have to force herself to become someone else.

=== Stage play ===
A stage play adaptation of the manga ran in Japan in May 2019. A second stage play, adapting events in the Regarding Saeki Sayaka light novels, ran from October to November 2020. An encore performance of the stage play, with a script revised to include the events of the manga's conclusion, was announced in October 2019 as part of the "Curtain Call" project following the end of the manga's serialization. It was planned for the fall of 2020, but was delayed due to the COVID-19 pandemic. In July 2022, the encore was rescheduled to be performed between November 25 and December 4, 2022, with the previous main cast slated to reprise their roles.

== Reception ==
=== Sales and accolades ===
By 2019, there were 1,000,000 copies in print in Japan alone. It placed fourth in the 2017 Next Manga Awards from Niconico and Da Vinci. The manga also ranked on Oricon's weekly manga rankings chart, with Volume 4 reaching 30th place and Volume 5 reaching 21st place. The manga placed third in AnimeJapan's 2018 "Manga Most Wanted as Anime by Fans" poll. Sword Art Online creator Reki Kawahara stated in a conversation with Nakatani and Ai Kayano (the voice of Sayaka in the anime) that he was a fan of the series.

In a poll conducted by the Japanese site Anime Anime in April 2022, Bloom Into You came in third place amongst the anime that readers said they most wanted a continuation of.

=== Critical response ===
Erica Friedman, reviewing Bloom Into You on a per-volume basis, was initially critical of the series. Friedman praised its artwork, gender diversity in the cast, and lack of reliance on fanservice, but expressed discomfort with Touko's forward expression of her feelings and the perceived dubious consensuality of the kissing scenes. Friedman also disliked the straightforward romance plot, feeling that the possibility of Yuu being asexual or aromantic was not considered. However, Friedman praised Sayaka's character and her subplot within the manga, as well as the inclusion of Riko and Miyako as positive role models of a functioning relationship. She described the story as "intriguing, rather than entertaining" and hoped for later plot turns to address her criticisms. Friedman later praised a scene in the fifth volume for seeing Yuu become "an active participant in the narrative" when she urges Touko to not depend on her for fulfillment. Despite remaining disappointed that Yuu was not "a rare aromantic manga protagonist", she ultimately praised the series's character development and ending.

Michelle Smith of Manga Bookshelf wrote that she initially considered Touko's early confession to be "unearned" but that later developments in the remainder of the first volume captured her intrigue. Sean Gaffney felt that Yuu's portrayal was a "nice reversal" and credited her character with the manga's popularity, but also praised the narrative and cast in general, saying he "was surprised several times throughout."

Rebecca Silverman of Anime News Network gave a generally positive review to the manga's first volume, saying that the potential of Yuu being aromantic made the story more interesting for offering representation to an underrepresented group. Silverman speculated that Yuu's sexual experimentation with Touko throughout the story was reflective of Nakatani writing her first yuri series as well as her debut work after her history of primarily authoring doujinshi, saying, "What we could be seeing is an author experimenting with a genre she's not entirely comfortable with yet". She also complimented the choice to set the story in a co-ed school as a "nice change" from other yuri stories, and said that it had "no 'forceful' tropes" (such as in Citrus or NTR: Netsuzou Trap). However, Silverman called Nakatani's art and character designs simple and "slightly generic", though she praised the expressions for being "easy to read".

In a feature for Neo, Alex Jones praised the anime adaptation as a "far broader" exploration of its subject matter in contrast with the fan service-focused approach of Citrus (whose anime adaptation had aired the same year as Bloom Into You's). Jones further commended Sayaka's inclusion and how the series explored her backstory, saying that it elevated her character beyond the common trope of the "unrequited best friend crush", and also praised the role of Riko and Miyako in helping her be confident in her identity. Reviewing the anime in the same issue, Jones felt that the topic of aromanticism was never "fetishized," and praised the story's themes of self-introspection as well as the quality of the production and character expressions, saying the anime "never relies on trying to be 'cute' in the conventional sense". Jones' singular note of criticism was the anime only offering an "incomplete story" due to it not adapting the remainder of the manga.

Writers for the site Anime Feminist also reviewed the anime adaptation. In a review of the first episode, Vrai Kaiser said the premiere has "all the makings of a solid romantic melodrama", describing it as a "quiet slow burn", and praised the color filters for "emphasizing the florals and changing of seasons". However, they said that those who see Yuu as on the asexual/aromantic spectrum would be "disappointed or even hurt", but praised the series for visual appeal, and hoped it would open the door to "additional yuri anime made for queer female audiences." In a later review, they described the anime adaptation as "quite beautiful" despite expressing an overall preference for the manga. Alex Henderson, another writer for the site, was more positive, saying that the series interrogates common tropes in yuri, provides "important queer representation" in fiction, and has "representation of adult queer couples" unlike other yuri titles.

=== Themes and analysis ===
==== Asexuality and aromanticism ====
Numerous English-language critics reviewing both the manga and the anime interpreted the character of Yuu Koito, and her expressed lack of attraction to Touko early in the story as suggesting that she was asexual or aromantic (or some variation thereof). Reviews either praised the series for perceived representation of aroace identities, or criticized it as an inadequate or disappointing depiction. Natasha H., in a piece for Crunchyroll, said that the story avoided depicting Yuu as "broken" and showed her as an aromantic individual who was nonetheless capable of a fulfilling relationship with Touko. In Neo, Alex Jones wrote that while Yuu's feelings may at first appear aromantic, further developments in the narrative rather suggested that she was demisexual. Jones acknowledged that this could be "disheartening" to aromantic readers, but said that with Maki's inclusion, the series avoided implying aromantic individuals to be "late bloomers".

Bauman attributed the spread of this reading to the anime adaptation, which did not cover later plot developments in which Yuu develops explicit sexual attractions towards Touko. While Bauman said it was "a valid and understandable argument" if based only off of the anime, she nonetheless denied this reading, citing the advertising of the work as a conventional love story and the explicit depiction of romantic and sexual attraction on both sides. Bauman felt that Yuu's early failure to reciprocate Touko's attraction was attributed to a "character fault" rather than an expression of any non-standard romantic orientation. Additionally, she criticized the character of Maki as a poor example of aromantic representation, saying that the series did not acknowledge the reality of aromantic and asexual individuals who "can have meaningful lives and stories of their own that do not necessarily involve courtship."

==== Use of yuri tropes ====
Writing for Anime News Network, Nicki "YuriMother" Bauman called Bloom Into You "one of the most successful yuri works," noting its commercial success and popularity with readers, of which she said it "deserves every bit". In spite of this acknowledgement, Bauman was nonetheless critical of the series. While she said it broke away from many tropes commonly associated with yuri, she said it still featured numerous genre conventions, describing it as "a near-textbook example of the 'girl-meets-girl' structure". Bauman pointed to many narrative elements, such as the school play plotline and Sayaka's attraction to Touko, as imitative of other series such as Maria-sama ga Miteru and Strawberry Panic!. Another point of criticism was Touko's forceful expression of her affection for Yuu, described as an example of the "predatory lesbian" trope that Bauman called "one of yuri's most harmful".

In spite of this, Bauman praised how Nakatani broke from the tradition of "transitory same-sex love" established by Class S stories in depicting Yuu and Touko having sex and becoming a couple in adulthood (although she noted that Kisses, Sighs, and Cherry Blossom Pink and Kase-san had already similarly broken from this convention). In a piece for Anime Feminist, Alex Henderson also praised Sayaka's character arc, the depiction of Riko and Miyako's relationship, and their role in her story as upending the "just a phase" framing of Class S tropes. Bauman agreed with Henderson, additionally praising Sayaka's story in the light novel spinoff series and describing Riko and Miyako as "queer adult figures guiding the next generation".
