= J.C.Staff =

Japanese animation studio

J.C.Staff Co., Ltd.

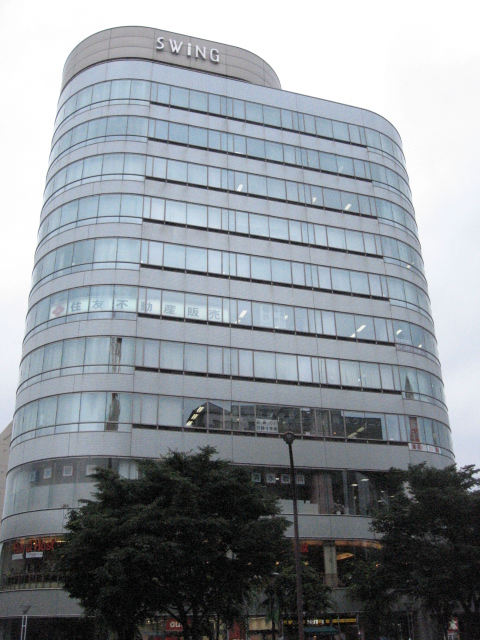
- Swing Building, where the central office is located
- Native name: 株式会社ジェー・シー・スタッフ
- Romanized name: Khabushiki-gaisha Jē Shī Sutaffu
- Type: Kabushiki gaisha
- Industry: Japanese animation
- Founded: January 18, 1986; 40 years ago
- Founder: Tomoyuki Miyata
- Headquarters: Sakai, Musashino, Tokyo, Japan
- Key people: Tomoyuki Miyata (Note: President and CEO.); Masakazu Watanabe (Note: Board member and general affairs manager.); Yuuji Matsukura (Note: Executive officer and head of production.)
- Number of employees: 226 (214 Full-Time)
- Divisions: J.C.STAFF CG Department; J.C.STAFF Photography Department J.C.STAFF Background Art Department J.C.STAFF Finishing Department; J.C.STAFF Animation Department
- Website: www.jcstaff.co.jp

J.C.Staff Co., Ltd. (Japanese: 株式会社ジェー・シー・スタッフ, Hepburn: Kabushiki-gaisha Jē Shī Sutaffu) is a Japanese animation studio founded in January 1986 by Tomoyuki Miyata, who previously worked at Tatsunoko Production. The studio's first release was Yōtōden in 1987. They have produced several well-known anime series, such as Aria the Scarlet Ammo, Azumanga Daioh, Bakuman, the A Certain Magical Index franchise (including Railgun and Accelerator), Date A Live III, The Disastrous Life of Saiki K., Edens Zero, The Familiar of Zero, Fairy Tail: 100 Years Quest, Food Wars!: Shokugeki no Soma, Golden Time, Is It Wrong to Try to Pick Up Girls in a Dungeon?, Maid Sama!, Mewkledreamy, One-Punch Man season 2 and 3, Revolutionary Girl Utena, Slayers, Shakugan no Shana, The Pet Girl of Sakurasou, and Toradora!.

== Productions ==
=== TV series ===
Title	First run start date	First run end date	Network	Eps	Note(s)
Metal Fighter Miku	July 8, 1994	September 30, 1994	TV Tokyo	13	Original work directed by Akiyuki Shinbo.
Touma Kijin Den Oni	October 5, 1995	March 21, 1996	TV Tokyo	25	Based on the Japanese role-playing game ONI series.
Maze: The Mega-Burst Space	April 2, 1997	September 24, 1997	TV Tokyo	25	Adaptation of the light novel series by Satoru Akahori.
Revolutionary Girl Utena	April 2, 1997	December 24, 1997	TV Tokyo	39	Based on the original concept by Be-Papas.
Alice SOS	April 6, 1998	January 28, 1999	NHK	14	Original work directed by Shingo Kaneko.
Kare Kano	October 2, 1998	March 23, 1999	TV Tokyo	26	Adaptation of the manga series by Masami Tsuda. Co-animated with Gainax.
Sorcerous Stabber Orphen	October 3, 1998	March 27, 1999	TBS	24	Adaptation of the light novel series by Yoshinobu Akita.
If I See You in My Dreams	November 30, 1998	December 24, 1998	TBS	16	Adaptation of the manga series by Noriyuki Yamahana.
Iketeru Futari	February 2, 1999	February 26, 1999	TBS	16	Adaptation of the manga series by Takashi Sano.
Starship Girl Yamamoto Yohko	April 4, 1999	September 26, 1999	TV Tokyo	26	Adaptation of the light novel series by Takashi Shōji.
Sorcerous Stabber Orphen: Revenge	October 2, 1999	March 26, 2000	TBS	23	Sequel to Sorcerous Stabber Orphen.
Excel Saga	October 7, 1999	March 30, 2000	TV Tokyo	26	Adaptation of the manga series by Rikdo Koshi.
UFO Baby	March 28, 2000	February 26, 2002	NHK-BS2	78	Adaptation of the Daa! Daa! Daa! manga series by Mika Kawamura.
Descendants of Darkness	October 2, 2000	December 18, 2000	Wowow	13	Adaptation of the manga series by Yoko Matsushita.
Rune Soldier	April 3, 2001	September 18, 2001	Wowow	24	Adaptation of the light novel series by Ryo Mizuno.
PaRappa the Rapper	April 14, 2001	January 11, 2002	Fuji TV	30	Based on the PaRappa the Rapper video game. Production co-operation by Production I.G.
A Little Snow Fairy Sugar	October 2, 2001	March 26, 2002	TBS	24	Original work directed by Shinichiro Kimura.
Azumanga Daioh	April 8, 2002	September 30, 2002	TV Tokyo	26	Adaptation of the manga series by Kiyohiko Azuma.
Ai Yori Aoshi	April 11, 2002	September 26, 2002	Fuji TV	24	Adaptation of the manga series by Kou Fumizuki.
Spiral: The Bonds of Reasoning	October 1, 2002	March 25, 2003	TV Tokyo	25	Adaptation of the manga series by Kyou Shirodaira and Eita Mizuno.
Nanaka 6/17	January 8, 2003	March 26, 2003	TV Tokyo	12	Adaptation of the manga series by Ken Yagami.
Someday's Dreamers	January 9, 2003	March 27, 2003	TV Asahi, All-Nippon News Network	12	Adaptation of the manga series by Norie Yamada and Kumichi Yoshizuki.
Gunparade March: The New March	February 6, 2003	April 24, 2003	MBS, TV Kanagawa	12	Based on the Kōkidō Gensō Gunparade March video game developed by Alfa System.
Ikki Tōsen: Battle Vixens	July 30, 2003	October 22, 2003	AT-X, TVK, Mie TV, Chiba TV, TV Saitama, SUN	13	Adaptation of the manga series by Yūji Shiozaki.
R.O.D -The TV-	October 1, 2003	March 16, 2004	Fuji TV	26	Sequel to Read or Die (OVA).
Shingetsutan Tsukihime	October 9, 2003	December 25, 2003	Animax, TBS, BS-i	12	Adaptation of the dōjin visual novel by Type-Moon.
Ai Yori Aoshi: Enishi	October 12, 2003	December 28, 2003	Chiba TV, TV Kanagawa, TVS	12	Sequel to Ai Yori Aoshi.
Maburaho	October 14, 2003	April 6, 2004	Wowow	24	Adaptation of the light novel series by Toshihiko Tsukiji.
Daphne in the Brilliant Blue	January 15, 2004	July 3, 2004	TV Kanagawa	24	Original work directed by Takashi Ikehata.
Doki Doki School Hours	April 4, 2004	June 27, 2004	TV Tokyo	13	Adaptation of the manga series by Tamami Momose.
Melody of Oblivion	April 6, 2004	September 21, 2004	TBS	24	Adaptation of the manga series by Shinji Katakura. Co-animated with Gainax.
Starship Operators	January 5, 2005	March 30, 2005	TV Tokyo	13	Adaptation of the light novel series by Ryo Mizuno.
Mahoraba ~Heartful Days~	January 10, 2005	June 26, 2005	TV Tokyo	26	Adaptation of the manga series by Akira Kojima.
Best Student Council	April 6, 2005	September 28, 2005	TV Tokyo, AT-X	26	Original work directed by Yoshiaki Iwasaki.
Loveless	April 7, 2005	June 30, 2005	TV Asahi	12	Adaptation of the manga series by Yun Kōga.
Honey and Clover	April 14, 2005	September 26, 2005	Fuji TV (Noitamina)	24	Adaptation of the manga series by Chica Umino.
Oku-sama wa Mahō Shōjo: Bewitched Agnes	July 4, 2005	September 25, 2005	Kids Station	13	Original work directed by Hiroshi Nishikiori.
Shakugan no Shana	October 6, 2005	March 23, 2006	Animax, MBS, TVA, Teletama, Chiba TV, TV Kanagawa	24	Adaptation of the light novel series by Yashichiro Takahashi.
Karin	November 3, 2005	May 11, 2006	Wowow	24	Adaptation of the manga series by Yuna Kagesaki.
Yomigaeru Sora – Rescue Wings	January 8, 2006	March 26, 2006	TV Tokyo, Animax	13	Original work directed by Katsushi Sakurabi.
Honey and Clover II	June 29, 2006	September 14, 2006	Fuji TV (Noitamina)	12	Sequel to Honey and Clover.
The Familiar of Zero	July 3, 2006	September 25, 2006	CTC	13	Adaptation of the light novel series by Noboru Yamaguchi.
Ghost Hunt	October 3, 2006	March 27, 2007	TV Tokyo	25	Adaptation of the light novel series by Fuyumi Ono.
Living for the Day After Tomorrow	October 5, 2006	December 21, 2006	TBS	12	Adaptation of the manga series by J-ta Yamada.
Di Gi Charat: Winter Garden	December 22, 2006	December 23, 2006	TBS, BS-i	2	Spin-off of Di Gi Charat series.
Nodame Cantabile	January 11, 2007	June 26, 2007	Fuji TV (Noitamina)	23	Adaptation of the manga series by Tomoko Ninomiya.
Sky Girls	July 5, 2007	December 27, 2007	Chiba TV	26	Adaptation of Sky Girls OVA.
Potemayo	July 6, 2007	September 21, 2007	Tokyo MX, Chiba TV, TV Kanagawa, Teletama, KBS Kyoto, SUN-TV, Mētele, AT-X	12	Adaptation of the manga series by Haruka Ogataya.
The Familiar of Zero: Knight of the Twin Moons	July 9, 2007	September 24, 2007	CTC, TVK	12	Sequel to The Familiar of Zero.
Shakugan no Shana II	October 5, 2007	March 28, 2008	MBS, TBS, CBC, Animax	24	Sequel to Shakugan no Shana.
KimiKiss: Pure Rouge	October 6, 2007	March 24, 2008	CTC, TVK, TV Saitama, TV Aichi, MBS, RKB	24	Based on a dating sim game by Enterbrain.
Sky Girls TV DVD Specials	November 13, 2007	June 25, 2008	Chiba TV	9	Side story of Sky Girls.
Shigofumi: Letters from the Departed	January 6, 2008	March 22, 2008	CTC, TVK, TV Saitama, KBS, Tokyo MX, Sun TV, MTV, BS11, GBS	12	Original work directed by Tatsuo Satō.
Nabari no Ou	April 6, 2008	September 28, 2008	TV Tokyo	26	Adaptation of the manga series by Yuhki Kamatani.
Slayers Revolution	July 2, 2008	September 24, 2008	TV Tokyo	13	Sequel to Slayers TRY.
The Familiar of Zero: Rondo of Princesses	July 6, 2008	September 21, 2008	CTC, TVK	12	Sequel to The Familiar of Zero: Knight of the Twin Moons.
Toradora!	October 2, 2008	March 26, 2009	TV Tokyo	25	Adaptation of the light novel series by Yuyuko Takemiya.
A Certain Magical Index	October 4, 2008	March 19, 2009	AT-X, Tokyo MX, Teletama, Chiba TV, MBS, TVK, CBC	24	Adaptation of the light novel series by Kazuma Kamachi.
Nodame Cantabile: Paris-Hen	October 9, 2008	December 18, 2008	Fuji TV (Noitamina)	11	Sequel to Nodame Cantabile.
Slayers Evolution-R	January 12, 2009	April 6, 2009	TV Tokyo	13	Sequel to Slayers Revolution.
Hayate the Combat Butler!!	April 3, 2009	September 18, 2009	TV Tokyo	25	Sequel to Hayate the Combat Butler.
First Love Limited	April 11, 2009	June 27, 2009	BS11 Digital	12	Adaptation of the manga series by Mizuki Kawashita.
Sweet Blue Flowers	July 2, 2009	September 10, 2009	Fuji TV (Noise)	11	Adaptation of the manga series by Takako Shimura.
Taishō Baseball Girls	July 2, 2009	September 24, 2009	TBS	12	Adaptation of the light novel series by Atsushi Kagurazaka.
A Certain Scientific Railgun	October 3, 2009	March 20, 2010	Tokyo MX, MBS, Chiba TV, TVK, Teletama, AT-X	24	Adaptation of the manga series by Kazuma Kamachi.
Nodame Cantabile: Finale	January 14, 2010	March 25, 2010	Fuji TV (Noitamina)	11	Sequel to Nodame Cantabile: Paris-Hen.
Maid Sama!	April 1, 2010	September 23, 2010	TBS, BS-TBS, Animax Asia	26	Adaptation of the manga series by Hiro Fujiwara.
The Betrayal Knows My Name	April 11, 2010	September 19, 2010	Chiba TV	24	Adaptation of the manga series Odagiri Hotaru.
Okami-san and Her Seven Companions	July 1, 2010	September 16, 2010	AT-X, CTC, TVK, TV Saitama, Tokyo MX, TV Aichi, Sun TV	12	Adaptation of the light novel series by Masashi Okita.
Bakuman	October 2, 2010	April 2, 2011	NHK-E	25	Adaptation of the manga series by Tsugumi Ohba and Takeshi Obata.
Otome Yōkai Zakuro	October 4, 2010	December 27, 2010	TV Tokyo	13	Adaptation of the manga series by Lily Hoshino.
Tantei Opera Milky Holmes	October 7, 2010	December 23, 2010	Tokyo MX	12	Adaptation of the manga series by Bushiroad.
A Certain Magical Index II	October 8, 2010	April 1, 2011	AT-X, Tokyo MX, Teletama, Chiba TV, MBS, TVK, CBC	24	Sequel to A Certain Magical Index.
Dream Eater Merry	January 7, 2011	April 8, 2011	TBS, MBS, CBC, BS-TBS, RKK	13	Adaptation of the manga series by Ushiki Yoshitaka.
Aria the Scarlet Ammo	April 14, 2011	June 30, 2011	TBS, CBC, MBS, MBC, BS-TBS	12	Adaptation of the light novel series by Chūgaku Akamatsu.
Heaven's Memo Pad	July 2, 2011	September 24, 2011	Chiba TV, TV Saitama, TV Kanagawa, Tokyo MX, AT-X, MBS, CBC	12	Adaptation of the light novel series by Hikaru Sugii.
Twin Angel: Twinkle Paradise	July 5, 2011	September 20, 2011	TV Kanagawa	12	Based on a pachisuro game from Trivy and Sammy.
Bakuman. 2	October 1, 2011	March 24, 2012	NHK-E	25	Sequel to Bakuman.
Kimi to Boku	October 4, 2011	December 27, 2011	TV Tokyo	13	Adaptation of the manga series by Kiichi Hotta.
Shakugan no Shana III: Final	October 8, 2011	March 24, 2012	Tokyo MX, Chiba TV, TV Kanagawa, MBS, CBC, AT-X, BS11	24	Sequel to Shakugan no Shana II.
Tantei Opera Milky Holmes: Act 2	January 5, 2012	March 22, 2012	Tokyo MX	12	Sequel to Tantei Opera Milky Holmes. Co-animated with Artland.
Kill Me Baby	January 5, 2012	March 29, 2012	TBS	13	Adaptation of the manga series by Kaduho.
The Familiar of Zero F	January 7, 2012	March 24, 2012	AT-X	12	Sequel to The Familiar of Zero: Rondo of Princesses.
Waiting in the Summer	January 10, 2012	March 27, 2012	TVA, KBS, AT-X	12	Original work directed by Tatsuyuki Nagai.
Kimi to Boku 2	April 3, 2012	June 26, 2012	TV Tokyo	13	Sequel to Kimi to Boku.
La storia della Arcana Famiglia	July 1, 2012	September 16, 2012	Sun TV, Chiba TV	12	Adaptation of the visual novel series developed by HuneX.
Joshiraku	July 5, 2012	September 28, 2012	MBS, TBS, CBC, BS-TBS	13	Adaptation of the manga series by Kōji Kumeta.
Bakuman. 3	October 6, 2012	March 30, 2013	NHK-E	25	Sequel to Bakuman. 2.
Little Busters!	October 6, 2012	April 6, 2013	Tokyo MX, TV Kanagawa, MBS, TV Aichi, BS11, AT-X	26	Adaptation of the visual novel developed by Key.
The Pet Girl of Sakurasou	October 9, 2012	March 26, 2013	Tokyo MX, MBS, TVA, TVK, Animax	24	Adaptation of the light novel series by Hajime Kamoshida.
A Certain Scientific Railgun S	April 12, 2013	September 27, 2013	Tokyo MX, AT-X	24	Sequel to A Certain Scientific Railgun.
The "Hentai" Prince and the Stony Cat.	April 13, 2013	June 29, 2013	Tokyo MX, TVA, MBS, BS11, RKB, TVh, Animax	12	Adaptation of the light novel series by Sou Sagara.
Futari wa Milky Holmes	July 13, 2013	September 28, 2013	Tokyo MX	12	Sequel to Tantei Opera Milky Holmes: Act 2. Co-animated with Nomad.
Golden Time	October 3, 2013	March 27, 2014	MBS, Tokyo MX, CTC, TVK, TV Saitama, TV Aichi, BS11, AT-X	24	Adaptation of the light novel series by Yuyuko Takemiya.
Little Busters! Refrain	October 5, 2013	December 28, 2013	Tokyo MX, MBS, TV Aichi, BS11, AT-X	13	Sequel to Little Busters!.
Witchcraft Works	January 5, 2014	March 23, 2014	Tokyo MX, TVA, AT-X, BS11, ABC	12	Adaptation of the manga series by Ryū Mizunagi.
selector infected WIXOSS	April 3, 2014	June 19, 2014	MBS, Tokyo MX, TV Aichi, AT-X, BS11	12	Original work in collaboration with Tomy and Warner Bros. Japan.
Dai-Shogun – Great Revolution	April 9, 2014	June 26, 2014	Tokyo MX, Sun TV, BS11, KBS, MTV, TV Saitama, CTC, TVK, GBS, TVQ	12	Original work directed by Takashi Watanabe. Co-animated with A.C.G.T.
Magimoji Rurumo	July 9, 2014	September 24, 2014	AT-X, Tokyo MX, KBS, Sun TV, TV Aichi, BS11, NBC	12	Adaptation of the manga series by Wataru Watanabe.
Love Stage!!	July 9, 2014	September 10, 2014	Tokyo MX, Sun TV, BS11, MTV, TV Saitama, CTC, TVK, GBS, TVQ, Anime Network	10	Adaptation of the manga series by Eiki Eiki and Taishi Zaō.
selector spread WIXOSS	October 4, 2014	December 20, 2014	MBS, Tokyo MX, TV Aichi, AT-X, BS11	12	Sequel to selector infected WIXOSS.
Tantei Opera Milky Holmes TD	January 4, 2015	March 28, 2015	Tokyo MX	12	Sequel to Futari wa Milky Holmes. Co-animated with Nomad.
Food Wars!: Shokugeki no Soma	April 3, 2015	September 25, 2015	TBS, MBS, CBC, BS-TBS, Animax, Tokyo MX, BS11	24	Adaptation of the manga series by Yūto Tsukuda and Shun Saeki.
Is It Wrong to Try to Pick Up Girls in a Dungeon?	April 4, 2015	June 27, 2015	Tokyo MX, SUN, KBS, BS11, AT-X, TV Aichi	13	Adaptation of the light novel series by Fujino Ōmori. Also known as DanMachi.
Shimoneta	July 4, 2015	September 19, 2015	AT-X, Tokyo MX, KBS, CTC, TVK, Sun TV, TV Aichi, BS11	12	Adaptation of the light novel series by Hirotaka Akagi.
Prison School	July 10, 2015	September 25, 2015	Tokyo MX, KBS, Sun TV, TV Aichi, BS11, AT-X	12	Adaptation of the manga series by Akira Hiramoto.
Heavy Object	October 2, 2015	March 25, 2016	Tokyo MX, MBS, TVA, BS11, AT-X	24	Adaptation of the light novel series by Kazuma Kamachi.
Flying Witch	April 9, 2016	June 25, 2016	NTV, Sun TV, RAB, BS Nittele, MMT	12	Adaptation of the manga series by Chihiro Ishizuka.
Food Wars! Shokugeki no Soma: The Second Plate	July 2, 2016	September 24, 2016	TBS, MBS, CBC, BS-TBS, Animax, Tokyo MX, BS11	13	Sequel to Food Wars! Shokugeki no Soma.
The Disastrous Life of Saiki K.	July 4, 2016	December 26, 2016	TV Tokyo, TV Aichi, TV Osaka, TV Hokkaido	26	Adaptation of the manga series by Shūichi Asō.
Taboo Tattoo	July 4, 2016	September 19, 2016	TV Tokyo, AT-X, BS Japan	12	Adaptation of the manga series by Shinjirō.
Amanchu!	July 8, 2016	September 22, 2016	AT-X, Tokyo MX, Sun TV, SBS, KBS, BS11	12	Adaptation of the manga series by Kozue Amano.
Lostorage incited WIXOSS	October 8, 2016	December 24, 2016	BS11, Tokyo MX, KBS, Sun TV, TV Asahi Channel 1	12	Spin-off of selector infected WIXOSS.
Urara Meirocho	January 5, 2017	March 23, 2017	TBS, CBC, Sun TV, BS-TBS, TBS Channel 1	12	Adaptation of the manga series by Harikamo.
Minami Kamakura High School Girls Cycling Club	January 6, 2017	March 25, 2017	AT-X, TVO, TVK, TVA	12	Adaptation of the manga series by Noriyuki Matsumoto. Co-animated with A.C.G.T.
Schoolgirl Strikers	January 7, 2017	April 1, 2017	Tokyo MX, BS11, AT-X, KBS, Sun TV	13	Adaptation of the Japanese social network game by Square Enix
Marginal#4 KISS Kara Tsukuru Big Bang	January 12, 2017	March 30, 2017	Tokyo MX, AT-X, SUN, BS11, KBS	12	Based on the Marginal #4 franchise by Rejet.
Alice & Zoroku	April 2, 2017	June 25, 2017	Tokyo MX, KBS, Sun TV, BS11, AT-X	12	Adaptation of the manga series by Tetsuya Imai.
Twin Angel Break	April 7, 2017	June 23, 2017	Tokyo MX, TV Aichi, KBS, Sun TV, BS11, TVQ	12	Based on a pachisuro game from Sammy and Trivy.
Sword Oratoria	April 14, 2017	June 30, 2017	Tokyo MX, KBS, Sun TV, BS11	12	Adaptation of the light novel series by Fujino Ōmori.
Vatican Miracle Examiner	July 7, 2017	September 22, 2017	WOWOW, Tokyo MX, AT-X, Sun TV, KBS, TV Aichi, BS11, TVQ	12	Adaptation of the light novel series by Rin Fujiki.
UQ Holder!: Magister Negi Magi! 2	October 2, 2017	December 18, 2017	Tokyo MX, Sun TV, KBS, BS11, AT-X, TVK	12	Adaptation of the manga series by Ken Akamatsu.
Food Wars! Shokugeki no Soma: The Third Plate	October 3, 2017	June 24, 2018	TBS, MBS, CBC, BS-TBS, Animax, Tokyo MX, BS11	24	Sequel to Food Wars! Shokugeki no Soma: The Second Plate.
Children of the Whales	October 8, 2017	December 24, 2017	Tokyo MX, Sun TV, KBS, BS11	12	Adaptation of the manga series by Abi Umeda.
The Disastrous Life of Saiki K. 2	January 17, 2018	June 27, 2018	Netflix	24	Sequel to The Disastrous Life of Saiki K.
Lostorage conflated WIXOSS	April 6, 2018	June 22, 2018	Tokyo MX, BS11	12	Sequel to Lostorage incited WIXOSS.
Amanchu! Advance	April 7, 2018	June 23, 2018	AT-X, Tokyo MX, BS11	12	Sequel to Amanchu!
Last Period	April 12, 2018	June 28, 2018	Tokyo MX, ABC, BS11, AT-X	12	Based on the Japanese role-playing game by Happy Elements.
Back Street Girls	July 4, 2018	September 5, 2018	BS11, Tokyo MX, MBS	10	Adaptation of the manga series by Jasmine Gyuh.
Angels of Death	July 6, 2018	September 21, 2018	AT-X, Tokyo MX, KBS Kyoto, TV Aichi, Sun TV, BS11, TVQ	12	Adaptation of the manga series by Kudan Naduka and Makoto Sanada.
Planet With	July 8, 2018	September 23, 2018	Tokyo MX, MBS, BS11, AT-X	12	Original work created by Satoshi Mizukami.
Hi Score Girl	July 13, 2018	September 28, 2018	Tokyo MX, MBS, BS11	12	Adaptation of the manga series by Rensuke Oshikiri. Production co-operation. Animation by Shogakukan Music & Digital Entertainment.
A Certain Magical Index III	October 5, 2018	April 5, 2019	AT-X, Tokyo MX, Teletama, Chiba TV, MBS, TVK, CBC	26	Sequel to A Certain Magical Index II.
Million Arthur	October 25, 2018	June 27, 2019	Tokyo MX, BS11, AT-X, SUN, TVA	23	Based on the Japanese massively multiplayer online role playing game by Square Enix.
Date A Live III	January 11, 2019	March 29, 2019	AT-X, Tokyo MX, KBS, TVA, SUN, BS11, TVQ, TwellV, Animax	12	Sequel to Date A Live II.
One-Punch Man 2	April 9, 2019	July 2, 2019	TV Tokyo	12	Sequel to One-Punch Man.
The Demon Girl Next Door	July 12, 2019	September 27, 2019	TBS, BS-TBS	12	Adaptation of the manga series by Izumo Itō.
A Certain Scientific Accelerator	July 12, 2019	September 27, 2019	AT-X, Tokyo MX, MBS, BS11	12	Adaptation of the manga series by Kazuma Kamachi.
Do You Love Your Mom and Her Two-Hit Multi-Target Attacks?	July 13, 2019	September 28, 2019	Tokyo MX, GTV, GYT, BS11, AT-X, MBS, TVA, NCC	12	Adaptation of the light novel series by Dachima Inaka.
Is It Wrong to Try to Pick Up Girls in a Dungeon? II	July 13, 2019	September 28, 2019	Tokyo MX, SUN, KBS, BS11, AT-X, TV Aichi	12	Sequel to Is It Wrong to Try to Pick Up Girls in a Dungeon?.
Food Wars! Shokugeki no Soma: The Fourth Plate	October 12, 2019	December 28, 2019	TBS, MBS, CBC, BS-TBS, Animax, Tokyo MX, BS11	12	Sequel to Food Wars! Shokugeki no Soma: The Third Plate.
Hi Score Girl II	October 25, 2019	December 20, 2019	Tokyo MX, MBS, BS11	9	Sequel to Hi Score Girl. Production co-operation. Animation by Shogakukan Music & Digital Entertainment.
A Certain Scientific Railgun T	January 10, 2020	September 25, 2020	AT-X, Tokyo MX, BS11, MBS	25	Sequel to A Certain Scientific Railgun S.
Mewkledreamy	April 5, 2020	April 4, 2021	TV Tokyo	48	Adaptation of the Mewkledreamy character by Sanrio.
Food Wars! Shokugeki no Soma: The Fifth Plate	April 10, 2020	September 25, 2020	TBS, MBS, CBC, BS-TBS, Animax, Tokyo MX, BS11	13	Sequel to Food Wars! Shokugeki no Soma: The Fourth Plate.
Is It Wrong to Try to Pick Up Girls in a Dungeon? III	October 3, 2020	December 19, 2020	Tokyo MX, SUN, KBS, BS11, AT-X	12	Sequel to Is It Wrong to Try to Pick Up Girls in a Dungeon? II.
WIXOSS Diva(A)Live	January 9, 2021	March 27, 2021	Tokyo MX, BS11	12	Spin-off of WIXOSS series.
Skate-Leading Stars	January 10, 2021	March 28, 2021	Tokyo MX, MBS, BS11, AT-X	12	Original work created by Gorō Taniguchi.
Kiyo in Kyoto: From the Maiko House	February 25, 2021	January 27, 2022	NHK World-Japan, NHK-E	12	Adaptation of the manga series by Aiko Koyama.
Combatants Will Be Dispatched!	April 4, 2021	June 20, 2021	AT-X, Tokyo MX, KBS, SUN, BS NTV	12	Adaptation of the light novel series by Natsume Akatsuki.
Blue Reflection Ray	April 10, 2021	September 25, 2021	MBS, TBS, BS-TBS	24	Spin-off of the video game Blue Reflection by Gust Co. Ltd.
Edens Zero	April 11, 2021	October 3, 2021	NTV	25	Adaptation of the manga series by Hiro Mashima.
Mewkledreamy Mix!	April 11, 2021	March 27, 2022	TV Tokyo	50	Sequel to Mewkledreamy.
How a Realist Hero Rebuilt the Kingdom	July 4, 2021	April 3, 2022	Tokyo MX, BS11	26	Adaptation of the light novel series by Dojyomaru.
The Duke of Death and His Maid	July 4, 2021	September 19, 2021	Tokyo MX, BS11, ytv	12	Adaptation of the manga series by Koharu Inoue.
The Strongest Sage with the Weakest Crest	January 8, 2022	March 26, 2022	Tokyo MX, BS11, SUN	12	Adaptation of the light novel series by Shinkoshoto.
Requiem of the Rose King	January 9, 2022	June 26, 2022	Tokyo MX, SUN, KBS Kyoto, BS11	24	Adaptation of the manga series by Aya Kanno.
The Executioner and Her Way of Life	April 2, 2022	June 18, 2022	Tokyo MX, BS11, AT-X	12	Adaptation of the light novel series by Mato Sato.
The Demon Girl Next Door Season 2	April 8, 2022	July 1, 2022	TBS, BS11	12	Sequel to The Demon Girl Next Door.
Is It Wrong to Try to Pick Up Girls in a Dungeon? IV	July 23, 2022	March 18, 2023	Tokyo MX, BS11, AT-X	22	Sequel to Is It Wrong to Try to Pick Up Girls in a Dungeon? III.
Sugar Apple Fairy Tale	January 6, 2023	September 22, 2023	AT-X, Tokyo MX, BS Asahi, SUN, KBS Kyoto	24	Adaptation of the light novel series by Miri Mikawa.
Edens Zero Season 2	April 2, 2023	October 1, 2023	NTV	25	Sequel to Edens Zero.
In Another World with My Smartphone Season 2	April 3, 2023	June 19, 2023	AT-X, TV Tokyo, BS TV Tokyo	12	Sequel to In Another World with My Smartphone.
Sacrificial Princess and the King of Beasts	April 20, 2023	September 28, 2023	Tokyo MX, BS11	24	Adaptation of the manga series by Yū Tomofuji.
Reign of the Seven Spellblades	July 8, 2023	October 14, 2023	Tokyo MX, BS11	15	Adaptation of the light novel series by Bokuto Uno.
The Duke of Death and His Maid Season 2	July 9, 2023	September 24, 2023	Tokyo MX, BS11, ytv, AT-X	12	Sequel to The Duke of Death and His Maid.
Tsukimichi: Moonlit Fantasy Season 2	January 8, 2024	June 24, 2024	Tokyo MX, BS NTV, MBS	25	Sequel to Tsukimichi: Moonlit Fantasy.
The Duke of Death and His Maid Season 3	April 7, 2024	June 23, 2024	Tokyo MX, BS11, ytv, AT-X	12	Sequel to The Duke of Death and His Maid Season 2.
Chillin' in Another World with Level 2 Super Cheat Powers	April 8, 2024	June 24, 2024	AT-X, Tokyo MX, Sun TV, BS11, KBS Kyoto	12	Adaptation of the light novel series by Miya Kinojo.
2.5 Dimensional Seduction	July 5, 2024	December 13, 2024	Tokyo MX, tvk, CTC, TVS, TVA, MBS, TVQ, BS11, AT-X, Animax	24	Adaptation of the manga series by Yu Hashimoto.
Fairy Tail: 100 Years Quest	July 7, 2024	January 5, 2025	TXN (TV Tokyo)	25	Adaptation of the manga series by Hiro Mashima and Atsuo Ueda.
Delico's Nursery	August 8, 2024	November 28, 2024	Tokyo MX, BS11, GTV, GYT, MBS	13	Based on the Trump stage play series by Kenichi Suemitsu.
Magilumiere Magical Girls Inc.	October 4, 2024	December 20, 2024	NTV	12	Adaptation of the manga series by Sekka Iwata and Yu Aoki. Co-animated with Studio Moe.
Is It Wrong to Try to Pick Up Girls in a Dungeon? V	October 5, 2024	March 7, 2025	Tokyo MX, BS11, AT-X	15	Sequel to Is It Wrong to Try to Pick Up Girls in a Dungeon? IV.
The Stories of Girls Who Couldn't Be Magicians	October 5, 2024	December 21, 2024	MBS, TBS, BS-TBS	12	Adaptation of the novel by Yuzuki Akasaka.
Murai in Love	October 6, 2024	December 22, 2024	Tokyo MX, BS NTV, BBC	12	Adaptation of the manga series by Junta Shima.
The Do-Over Damsel Conquers the Dragon Emperor	October 9, 2024	December 25, 2024	AT-X, Tokyo MX, BS NTV, Kansai TV	12	Adaptation of the light novel series by Sarasa Nagase.
Demon Lord 2099	October 13, 2024	December 29, 2024	Tokyo MX, GTV, GYT, BS11	12	Adaptation of the light novel series by Daigo Murasaki.
Honey Lemon Soda	January 9, 2025	March 27, 2025	Fuji TV (+Ultra)	12	Adaptation of the manga series by Mayu Murata.
Can a Boy-Girl Friendship Survive?	April 4, 2025	June 20, 2025	Tokyo MX, AT-X, BS Asahi, Kansai TV, UMK	12	Adaptation of the light novel series by Nana Nanana.
Backstabbed in a Backwater Dungeon	October 3, 2025	December 19, 2025	Tokyo MX, MBS, BS11	12	Adaptation of the light novel series by Shisui Meikyō.
Reincarnated as the Daughter of the Legendary Hero and the Queen of Spirits	October 5, 2025	December 21, 2025	Tokyo MX, BS NTV, HTB	12	Adaptation of the light novel series by Matsuura.
One-Punch Man 3 Part 1	October 12, 2025	December 28, 2025	TV Tokyo, TVh, TVA, TVO, TSC, TVQ	12	Sequel to One-Punch Man 2.
Tamon's B-Side	January 4, 2026	March 29, 2026	Tokyo MX, BS11	13	Adaptation of the manga series by Yuki Shiwasu.
Magilumiere Magical Girls Inc. Season 2	July 5, 2026	September 26, 2026	NTV	12	Sequel to Magilumiere Magical Girls Inc.
Overgeared	October 2, 2026	TBA	Tokyo MX, BS11	12	Adaptation of the web novel series by Saenal.
The Seven Knights of the Marronnier Kingdom	October 3, 2026	TBA	NHK-E	20	Adaptation of the manga series by Nao Iwamoto.
A Certain Dark Item	October 9, 2026	TBA	AT-X, Tokyo MX, BS11	11	Adaptation of the light novel series by Kazuma Kamachi.
Magical Buffs: The Support Caster Is Stronger Than He Realized!	January 4, 2027	TBA	Tokyo MX, MBS, BS11	TBA	Adaptation of the light novel series by Haka Tokura.
Wound & Bandage	January 9, 2027	TBA	All-Nippon News Network, ABC, TV Asahi	TBA	Adaptation of the manga series by Umihoshi Nanai.
Nabe ni Tama o Ukenagara	January 2027	TBA	NTV, ytv, BS NTV, AT-X	TBA	Adaptation of the manga series by Juntarō Aoki and Shin Moriyama.
One-Punch Man 3 Part 2	January 2027	TBA	TBA	TBA	Sequel to One-Punch Man 3 Part 1.
Nanatsu-ya: Shinobu and Her Jewelry Box	2027	TBA	TBA	TBA	Adaptation of the manga series by Tomoko Ninomiya.
Teenage Mercenary	2027	TBA	TBA	TBA	Adaptation of the manhwa by YC and Rakyeon.
2.5 Dimensional Seduction Season 2	TBA	TBA	TBA	TBA	Sequel to 2.5 Dimensional Seduction.
A Certain Scientific Railgun Season 4	TBA	TBA	TBA	TBA	Sequel to A Certain Scientific Railgun T.
Chillin' in Another World with Level 2 Super Cheat Powers Season 2	TBA	TBA	TBA	TBA	Sequel to Chillin' in Another World with Level 2 Super Cheat Powers.
Is It Wrong to Try to Pick Up Girls in a Dungeon? VI	TBA	TBA	TBA	TBA	Sequel to Is It Wrong to Try to Pick Up Girls in a Dungeon? V.
Tamon's B-Side Season 2	TBA	TBA	TBA	TBA	Sequel to Tamon's B-Side.

=== Films ===
Title	Release date	Note(s)
Wrath of the Ninja	May 27, 1989	Compilation of Yōtōden.
Apfelland Monogatari	December 12, 1992	Adaptation of the manga series by Yoshiki Tanaka.
Darkside Blues	October 8, 1994	Adaptation of the manga series by Hideyuki Kikuchi.
Slayers The Motion Picture	August 5, 1995	Prequel to Slayers.
Slayers Return	August 3, 1996	Sequel to Slayers The Motion Picture.
Magic School Lunar: Secret of the Blue Dragon	March 15, 1997	Adaptation of the manga series by Hiroko Touda - short movie.
Slayers Great	August 2, 1997	Sequel to Slayers Return.
Maze Bakunetsu Jikuu: Tenpen Kyoui no Giant	April 25, 1998	Sequel to Maze: The Mega-Burst Space.
Slayers Gorgeous	August 1, 1998	Sequel to Slayers Great.
Adolescence of Utena	August 14, 1999	Alternative retelling of Revolutionary Girl Utena
Azumanga Daioh: The Very Short Movie	December 22, 2001	Six-minute trailer of Azumanga Daioh.
Shakugan no Shana Movie	April 21, 2007	Adaptation of the first light novel of Shakugan no Shana.
A Certain Magical Index: The Movie – The Miracle of Endymion	February 23, 2013	Original story of A Certain Magical Index.
Aki no Kanade	March 22, 2015	Part of Anime Mirai 2015 - short movie.
Selector Destructed WIXOSS	February 13, 2016	Sequel to Selector Spread WIXOSS.
Tantei Opera Milky Holmes Movie: Gyakushuu no Milky Holmes	February 27, 2016	Sequel to Tantei Kageki Milky Holmes TD.
Is It Wrong to Try to Pick Up Girls in a Dungeon?: Arrow of the Orion	February 15, 2019	Original story of Is It Wrong to Try to Pick Up Girls in a Dungeon?.
KonoSuba: God's Blessing on this Wonderful World! Legend of Crimson	August 30, 2019	Sequel to KonoSuba.
Aria the Crepusculo	March 5, 2021	Sequel to Aria the Avvenire.
Kud Wafter	July 16, 2021	Adaptation of the visual novel developed by Key.
Sing a Bit of Harmony	October 29, 2021	Original work.
Aria the Benedizione	December 3, 2021	Sequel to Aria the Crepusculo.

=== OVAs / ONAs ===
Title	Release start date	Release end date	Episodes	Note(s)
Elf 17	January 14, 1987		1	Original work directed by Jun'ichi Sakata.
Yami no Purple Eye	1987		1	OVA episode.
Digital Devil	March 25, 1987		1	OVA episode.
Minna Agechau	March 28, 1987		1	Adaptation of a manga series by Hikaru Yuzuki
Yōtōden	May 21, 1987	May 11, 1988	3	Original work directed by Osamu Yamasaki.
High School AGENT	July 1, 1987	October 2, 1987	2	OVA episodes.
Ultimate Teacher	February 6, 1988		1	Adaptation of a manga series by Atsuji Yamamoto
Gakuen Benriya Series: AntiqueHeart	June 5, 1988		1	OVA episode.
Kosuke and Rikimaru: Dragon of Konpei Island	September 23, 1988		1	Original work directed by Toyoo Ashida. Co-written by Akira Toriyama and Ashida.
Cleopatra DC	April 28, 1989	May 24, 1991	3	Adaptation of a manga series by Kaoru Shintani.
Blood Reign: Curse of the Yoma	May 1, 1989	June 1, 1989	2	Adaptation of a manga series by Kei Kusunoki.
Fuuma no Kojirou: Yasha-hen	June 1, 1989	August 2, 1989	6	OVA episodes.
Shin Captain Tsubasa	July 1, 1989	July 1, 1990	13	OVA episodes.
Earthian	July 26, 1989	December 21, 1996	4	Adaptation of a manga series by Yun Kōga.
Tales of Yajikita College	September 15, 1989	July 25, 1991	2	Adaptation of a manga series by Ryoko Shitto. Also known as Yaji and Kita's School Diary.
Dog Soldier	October 8 ,1989		1	OVA episode.
1+2=Paradise	February 23, 1990	April 27, 1990	2	Adaptation of a manga series by Sumiko Kamimura
Guardian of Darkness	March 23, 1990	January 24, 1992	3	Original work directed by Osamu Yamazaki.
Gude Crest: The Emblem of Gude	June 23, 1990		1	OVA episode.
100%	September 7, 1990		1	OVA episode.
Osu! Karate Club	October 21, 1990	July 25, 1992	4	Adaptation of a manga series by Koji Takahashi.
Kumo ni Noru	March 8, 1991	June 7, 1991	2	OVA episodes.
The Heroic Legend of Arslan	August 17, 1991	September 21, 1995	6	Adaptation of a fantasy novel series by Yoshiki Tanaka. (Episodes 5 to 6 only)
Chou Bakumatsu Shounen Seiki Takamaru	November 1, 1991	December 20, 1991	2	OVA episodes.
Jingi	December 4 ,1991	April 8, 1992	2	OVA episodes.
Handsome na Kanojo	January 21, 1992		1	OVA episode.
High School Jingi	February 10, 1992		1	OVA episode.
Babel II	March 21, 1992	October 10, 1992	4	Adaptation of a manga series by Mitsuteru Yokoyama
Genji	May 21, 1992	October 10, 1992	2	OVA episodes.
Gorillaman	June 25, 1992	December 24, 1993	2	Adaptation of a manga series by Harold Sakuishi
Princess Army: Wedding Combat	August 1, 1992	September 21, 1992	2	OVA episodes.
Gensou Jotan Ellcia	October 23, 1992	September 23, 1993	4	Original work directed by Yoriyasu Kogawa.
Chō Bakumatsu Shōnen Seiki Takamaru	November 1, 1992	December 20, 1993	6	Original work directed by Toyoo Ashida.
Nekohiki no Ororane	November 26, 1992		1	Original work directed by Mizuho Nishikubo.
Wolf Guy	December 17, 1992	June 21, 1993	6	Adaptation of a manga series by Kazumasa Hirai (author) and Hisashi Sakaguchi.
Suna no Bara: Yuki no Mokushiroku	April 25, 1993		1	OVA episode.
Fight!! Spirit of the Sword	June 18, 1993		1	Adaptation of a manga series by Pink Aomata.
8 Man After	August 21, 1993	November 22, 1993	4	Adaptation of a manga series by Kazumasa Hirai and Jiro Kuwata.
Bad Boys	September 25, 1993	August 9, 1998	5	Adaptation of a manga series by Hiroshi Tanaka
Fortune Quest - Yonimo Shiawase na Bōkensha-tachi	September 10, 1993	October 5, 1994	4	Adaptation of a manga series by Mishio Fukusawa and Natsumi Mukai
Yōseiki Suikoden	September 25, 1993		1	Adaptation of a light novel by Hitoshi Yoshioka
New Dominion Tank Police	October 21, 1993	October 21, 1994	6	Sequel to Dominion.
Super Dimension Century Orguss 02	December 5, 1993	April 25, 1995	6	Sequel to Super Dimension Century Orguss.
My My Mai	December 16, 1993	January 21, 1994	4	OVA episodes.
Konpeki no Kantai	December 16, 1993	August 16, 2003	32	Adaptation of an alternate history novel series by Yoshio Aramaki.
Shonan Junai Gumi	January 21, 1994	January 24, 1997	5	Adaptation of a manga series by Tooru Fujisawa
I Shall Never Return	June 21, 1994		1	Adaptation of a manga series by Kazuna Uchida.
Fish in the Trap	July 21, 1994		1	Adaptation of a manga series by Ranma Nekokichi
Homeroom Affairs	August, 26 1994	October 21, 1994	2	OVA episodes.
You're Under Arrest	September 24, 1994	November 25, 1995	4	Adaptation of a manga series by Kōsuke Fujishima. Co-animated with Studio Deen. (Episodes 1 to 2 only)
Bounty Dog	October 1, 1994	November 1, 1994	2	Original work directed by Hiroshi Negishi.
Kusatta Kyoushi no Houteishiki	November 25, 1994	November 24, 1995	2	OVA episodes.
Udauda Yatteru Hima wa Nee!	April 7, 1995	August 25, 1995	2	OVA episodes.
Tokyo Revelation	April 21, 1995	June 21, 1995	2	Adaptation of a manga series of the same name. Known in Japan as Shin Megami Tensei: Tōkyō Mokushiroku.
Level C	July 14, 1995		1	Adaptation of a manga series by Futaba Aoi and Mitsuba Kurenai.
Galaxy Fräulein Yuna	September 21, 1995	November 22, 1995	2	Original work created by Mika Akitaka.
Captain Tsubasa: Holland Youth	December 16, 1995		1	Side story of Captain Tsubasa
Kodomo no Omocha (OVA)	December 16, 1995		1	Adaptation of a manga series by Miho Obana.
Itsuka no Main: Kaminari Shounen - Tenta Sanjou!	February 21, 1996		1	OVA episode.
Starship Girl Yamamoto Yohko	March 6, 1996	June 5, 1996	3	Adaptation of a light novel series by Shoji Takashi.
Bounty Hunter: the Hard	May 1, 1996		1	OVA episode.
Battle Arena Toshinden	June 21, 1996	August 21, 1996	2	Based on the Battle Arena Toshinden video game series.
Maze: The Mega-Burst Space OVA	July 24, 1996	September 21, 1996	2	Adaptation of a light novel series by Satoru Akahori.
Slayers Special	July 25, 1996	May 25, 1997	3	Side story of Slayers
Garzey's Wing	September 21, 1996	April 9, 1997	3	Original work directed by Yoshiyuki Tomino.
Private Psycho Lesson	September 27, 1996	November 1, 1996	2	Original work directed by Tetsurō Amino
Voltage Fighter Gowcaizer	September 27, 1996	January 31, 1997	3	Based on the Voltage Fighter Gowcaizer video game.
Galaxy Fräulein Yuna Returns	December 21, 1996	May 21, 1997	3	Sequel to Galaxy Fräulein Yuna.
Kyokujitsu no Kantai	February 21, 1997	2002	15	Spin-off of Konpeki no Kantai.
Kōgyō Aika Volley Boys	March 17, 1997	April 25, 1997	2	Adaptation of a manga series by Hiroyuki Murata
Voogie's Angel	July 24, 1997	July 24, 1998	3	OVA episodes.
Starship Girl Yamamoto Yohko II	August 6, 1997	December 22, 1997	3	Sequel to Starship Girl Yamamoto Yohko.
Legend of the Last Labyrinth	September 25, 1997	June 10, 1998	2	OVA episodes.
Detatoko Princess	December 1, 1997	May 21, 1998	3	Adaptation of a manga series by Hitoshi Okuda.
Fake	April 21, 1998		1	Adaptation of a manga series by Sanami Matoh.
If I See You in My Dreams	April 21, 1998	December 19, 1998	3	Adaptation of a manga series by Noriyuki Yamahana
Slayers Excellent	October 25, 1998	March 25, 1999	3	Sequel to Slayers Special.
Legend of the Galactic Heroes Gaiden: Spiral Labyrinth	December 24, 1999	January 27, 2001	28	A prequel to Legend of Galactic Heroes.
Cat Soup	February 21, 2001		1	Based on the work of manga artist Nekojiru.
Puni Puni Poemy	March 7, 2001		2	Spin-off of Excel Saga.
Alien Nine	June 25, 2001	February 25, 2002	4	Adaptation of a manga series by Hitoshi Tomizawa.
Armored Troopers J-Phoenix PF Lips Team	May 12, 2002	February 26, 2004	3	Based on Takara's video game series.
Eiken	June 25, 2003	June 23, 2004	2	Adaptation of a manga series by Seiji Matsuyama.
A Little Snow Fairy Sugar: Summer Special	August 21, 2003	August 28, 2003	2	Sequel to A Little Snow Fairy Sugar.
Doki Doki School Hours (OVA)	August 4, 2004	February 2, 2005	7	Sequel to Doki Doki School Hours.
Sky Girls	August 25, 2006		1	Original work directed by Yoshiaki Iwasaki.
Shakugan no Shana SP	December 8, 2006		1	Sequel to Shakugan no Shana.
Nodame Cantabile: Nodame to Chiaki no Umi Monogatari	February 16, 2008		1	OVA episode.
Shigofumi: And Then...	September 26, 2008		1	OVA episode.
PuriGorota: Uchuu no Yuujou Daibouken	November 16, 2008		1	OVA episode.
The Familiar of Zero: "Rondo" of Princesses - Seductive Beach	December 25, 2008		1	OVA episode.
Hayate no Gotoku!!: Atsu ga Natsuize-Mizugi-hen!	March 6, 2009		1	OVA episode.
Shakugan no Shana S	October 23, 2009	September 29, 2010	4	Sequel to Shakugan no Shana II.
Nodame Cantabile OVA 2	April 26, 2010		1	OVA episode.
Kyou, Koi wo Hajimemasu	June 25, 2010	October 23, 2010	2	OVA episodes.
A Certain Scientific Railgun: Being a Photo Shoot Model Under the Blazing Sun Isn't Easy, Is It?	July 24, 2010		1	OVA episode.
A Certain Scientific Railgun OVA: Since Misaka-san is the Center of Attention Right Now	September 26, 2010		1	OVA episode.
Toradora!: Bento Battle	December 21, 2011		1	OVA episode.
Dangerous Jii-san Ja	July 27, 2012		1	OVA episode.
Tantei Opera Milky Holmes Alternative	August 25, 2012	January 9, 2013	2	Side story of Tantei Opera Milky Holmes. Co-animated with Artland.
Joshiraku OVA	February 8, 2013		1	OVA episode.
Arcana Famiglia: Capriccio - stile Arcana Famiglia	March 27, 2013		1	OVA episode.
Kill Me Baby (OVA)	October 16, 2013		1	Side story of Kill Me Baby.
Little Busters! Sekai no Saitou wa Ore ga Mamoru!	August 28, 2013		1	OVA episode.
Little Busters! EX	January 29, 2014	July 30, 2014	8	Adaptation of the Little Busters! Ecstasy visual novel developed by Key.
A Certain Scientific Railgun S: All the Important Things I Learned in a Bathhouse	March 25, 2014		1	OVA episode.
Waiting in the Summer OVA	August 29, 2014		1	OVA episode.
LOVE STAGE!!: Chotto ja Nakutte	November 22, 2014		1	OVA episode.
Kaitou Tenshi Twin Angel: Kyun Kyun Tokimeki Paradise!!	December 28, 2014		2	Side story of Twin Angel: Twinkle Paradise.
Witch Craft Works: Takamiya-kun to Imouto no Warudakumi	January 17, 2015		1	Ova episode.
Prison School: Mad Wax	March 4, 2016		1	Ova episode.
Flying Witch Petit	March 18, 2016	June 24, 2016	9	Short clip series of "flying witch".
Food Wars!: Shokugeki no Soma (OVA)	May 2, 2016	May 2, 2018	5	Sequel to Food Wars!: Shokugeki no Soma.
Is It Wrong to Try to Pick Up Girls in a Dungeon?: Is It Wrong to Expect a Hot Spring in a Dungeon?	December 7, 2016		1	OVA episode.
Amanchu!: The Story of the Promised Summer and New Memories	March 29, 2017		1	OVA episode.
Minami Kamakura High School Girls Cycling Club: We're In Taiwan!!	May 15, 2017		1	OVA episode.
UQ HOLDER! OVA	September 8, 2017	June 8 ,2018	3	Adaptation of the manga series by Ken Akamatsu.
Lostorage conflated WIXOSS: missing link	December 14, 2017		1	A new special episode, announced at the WIXOSS event in 2017.
Vatican Miracle Examiner	April 11, 2018		1	OVA episode
Angels of Death	October 5, 2018	October 26, 2018	4	ONA episodes
Hi Score Girl: EXTRA STAGE	March 20, 2019		3	OVA episodes
Magimoji Rurumo OAD	July 9 ,2019		2	OVA episodes
One-Punch Man 2 (OVA)	October 25, 2019	March 27, 2020	6	OVA episodes.
The Disastrous Life of Saiki K.: Reawakened	December 30, 2019		6	Sequel to The Disastrous Life of Saiki K Season 2.
Is It Wrong to Go Searching for Herbs on a Deserted Island? II	January 29, 2020		1	OVA episode.
Do You Love Your Mom and Her Two-Hit Multi-Target Attacks?: Do You Love Your Mom on the Shore	March 25, 2020		1	OVA episode.
Zo Zo Zo Zombie-kun	April 3, 2020	December 25, 2020	102	Adaptation to the manga series by Yasunari Nagotoshi.
The Way of the Househusband	April 8, 2021	October 7, 2021	10	Adaptation of the manga series by Kousuke Oono.
Is It Wrong to Try to Pick Up Girls in a Dungeon? III	April 28, 2021		1	OVA episode.
The Way of the Househusband 2	January 1, 2023		5	Sequel to The Way of the Househusband.
I.CINNAMOROLL Animation	October 5, 2023		1	Special Animation.
Selector loth WIXOSS PV	April 26, 2024		1	Special PV for the 10th anniversary of selector infected WIXOSS.
Murai in Love	September 4, 2024	November 20, 2024	12	Adaptation of the manga series by Junta Shima.
Duel Masters Lost: Tsuioku no Suishō	October 4, 2024	October 29, 2024	4	Adaptation of the manga series by Shigenobu Matsumoto and Yō Kanebayashi.
Duel Masters Lost: Gekka no Shinigami	December 21, 2024	February 28, 2025	4	Sequel to Duel Masters Lost: Tsuioku no Suishō.
Duel Masters Lost: Boukyaku no Taiyou	February 6, 2026	February 27, 2026	4	Sequel to Duel Master Lost: Gekka no Shinigami.
Duel Masters Lost: Danzai no Shounen	October 9, 2026	TBA	4	Sequel to Duel Masters Lost: Boukyaku no Taiyou.
Patlabor EZY File 1	May 15, 2026/May 22, 2026		3	Reboot of the Patlabor series. Initial release as a limited theatrical pre-screening.
Patlabor EZY File 2	August 14, 2026/August 21, 2026		3	Reboot of the Patlabor series. Initial release as a limited theatrical pre-screening.
Patlabor EZY File 3	March 5, 2027/March 12, 2027		2	Reboot of the Patlabor series. Initial release as a limited theatrical pre-screening.

=== TV Specials ===
Title	Release date	End Date	Episodes	Note(s)
Zukkoke Sannin-gumi Kusunoki Yashiki no Guruguru-sama	November 11, 1995		1	Based on Nasu Masamoto's Zukkoke Sannin-gumi young adult novels series.
Konpeki no Kantai: Sourai Kaihatsu Monogatari	1997		1	Original work by Yoshio Aramaki.
Azumanga Daioh: The Very Short Movie	December 25, 2001		1	Original work by Kiyohiko Azuma.
Ai Yori Aoshi Yumegatari	April 1, 2002		1	Original work by Kou Fumizuki.
Ai Yori Aoshi Enishi - Miyuki	2003		1	Original work by Kou Fumizuki. Christmas special prequel to S1.
Nanaka the Distraction	June 17, 2003		1	Original work by Ken Yagami. Unaired series episode included in the DVD release.
Honey and Clover Specials	December 23, 2005	February, 24 2006	2	Original work by Chica Umino.
Shakugan no Shana Specials	January 25, 2006	April 4, 2007	4	Original work by Yashichiro Takahashi.
Shakugan no Shana: Naze Nani Shana	January 25, 2006	August 25, 2006	8	Original work by Yashichiro Takahashi.
Yomigaeru Sora: RESCUE WINGS - Saigo no Shigoto	June 17, 2006		1	Episode 13 of Yomigaeru Sora -Rescue Wings, released as a DVD special.
Rescue Angel	October 27, 2006		1	Included with the 7th volume of the Limited Edition DVD Box Set.
Shakugan no Shana: Koi to Onsen no Kougai Gakushuu!	December 8, 2006		1	Original work by Yashichiro Takahashi.
Di Gi Charat Winter Garden	December 22, 2006	December 23, 2006	2	Original work by Koge-Donbo.
Shakugan no SHANA: Shana to Yuuji no Naze Nani Shana	April 4, 2007		1	A promotional short special for the movie.
Shakugan no Shana Movie Special	September 21, 2007		1	Various scenes from the movie.
Potemayo Specials	September 25, 2007	February 22, 2008	6	Potemayo DVD specials.
Tsuri Baka Eika-san! Sky Girls Dynamite Fishing	November 13, 2007	June 25, 2008	9	Sky girls DVD specials.
Shakugan no Shana II (Second) Specials	January 25, 2008	October 19, 2009	3	Shakugan no Shana II specials.
Kimikiss pure rouge Special	August 22, 2008		1	DVD only episode entitled love fighter.
Zero no Tsukaima Princesses no Rondo Picture Drama	September 25, 2008	March 25, 2009	7	DVD specials.
Toradora! SOS! Hurray for Foodies	February 3, 2009	August 26, 2009	4	Toradora DVD shorts.
A Certain Magical Index Specials	February 7, 2009	May 29, 2009	2	A series of shorts featuring Index.
Toradora! Ami no Monomane 150 Renpatsu!!	April 30, 2009		1	Scene left out of episode 6 of the main series.
Hatsukoi Limited Gentei Shoujo	July 24, 2009	December 23, 2009	6	Original work by Mizuki Kawashita.
Taishou Yakyuu Musume Konya no Watashi wa Romantic Strike	October 7, 2009	January 6, 2010	2	DVD Specials.
Toaru Kagaku no Railgun Motto Marutto Railgun	January 29, 2010	May 28, 2010	2	DVD Specials.
Nodame Cantabile Finale Special	April 7, 2010		1	DVD special episode taking place before Episode 1 of Finale.
Maid-Sama! LaLa Special	July 24, 2010		1	DVD released with the magazine LaLa.
Otome Youkai Zakuro Picture Drama	November 24, 2010	June 26, 2011	2	Picture dramas included with the first and third limited edition DVD volumes.
A Certain Magical Index II Specials	January 26, 2011	June 22, 2011	2	New series of shorts featuring Index.
Kampfer fur die Liebe	March 6, 2011		2	Original work by Toshihiko Tsukiji.
Maid-Sama! It's an extra!	May 11, 2011		1	Extra episode included in Blu-ray and DVD volume 10.
Detective Opera Milky Holmes Summer Special	August 25, 2011		1	A special program of Tantei Opera Milky Holmes produced by the staff of the TV series.
Aria the Scarlet Ammo Special	December 21, 2011		1	Original work by Chuugaku Akamatsu.
Shakugan no Shana III (Final) Specials	January 27, 2012	May 30, 2012	2	DVD specials.
Accel World Acchel World.	July 25, 2012	February 27, 2013	8	DVD specials Spin-off of Accel World.
Detective Opera Milky Holmes: Alternative	August 18, 2012	December 9, 2012	2	DVD specials.
Bakuman 2nd Season Special	September 26, 2012		1	Short animation included as a bonus in the Blu-ray Box volume 2.
The Hentai Prince and the Stony Cat Henneko BBS	January 2, 2013	March 27, 2013	13	Specials that were initially broadcast as CMs.
Chokotan!	April 6, 2013		1	DVD special.
Bakuman 3 Specials	June 26, 2013	August 28, 2013	2	DVD specials.
A Certain Scientific Railgun S Specials	July 24, 2013	November 27, 2013	2	DVD specials.
Little Busters! EX	January 29, 2014	July 30, 2014	8	Original work by Key.
Tsubasa to Hotaru	March 16, 2014		1	Original work by Nana Haruta.
Naze Nani!? Witch Craft Works	March 26, 2014	August 27, 2014	6	DVD specials.
selector infected WIXOSS Midoriko-san to Piruluk-tan	August 27, 2014	December 19, 2014	3	DVD specials.
Tsubasa to Hotaru (2015)	March 6, 2015	March 27, 2015	4	Original work by Nana Haruta.
Tsubasa to Hotaru (2016)	May 10, 2016	May 24, 2016	3	Original work by Nana Haruta.
Amanchu! Upyopyo Dive Tsukkome! Umi no Sekai!	October 26, 2016	March 29, 2017	6	DVD specials.
Tantei Opera Milky Holmes Fun Fun Party Night - Ken to Janet no Okurimono	December 31, 2016		1	Brand-new animation announced at "Live Milky Holmes Full Colour Festival.
Eikou Naki Tensai-tachi Kara no Monogatari	March 25, 2017	May 28, 2017	2	An anime/documentary series about athletes present by NHK.
Detective Opera Milky Holmes Arsene Karei naru Yokubou	December 31, 2017		1	DVD special.
Children of the Whales Specials	January 26, 2018	March 23, 2018	2	Specials included with the home release of the TV anime.
The Disastrous Life of Saiki K. Season 3	December 28, 2018		1	Special episode that adapts the final chapters of the manga.
Tantei Opera Milky Holmes Psycho no Aisatsu	December 31, 2018		1	Original work by Takaaki Kidani.
Operation Han-Gyaku-Sei Million Arthur Special	October 2, 2019		1	Unaired episode bundled with the sixth Blu-ray volume.
Toaru Kagaku no Accelerator Tobidase Ippou-san Hachamecha Kaishingeki	October 30, 2019		1	DVD special.
Toaru Kagaku no Railgun T Motto Marutto Railgun	April 30, 2020	October 9, 2020	2	DVD specials.
Duel Masters Special Movie DO-KA	March 31, 2024		1	Special movie.

=== Video games ===
Title	Release year	Genres	Note(s)
Ginga Fukei Densetsu Sapphire	1995	Shoot 'em up	Animation
Psychic Force	1996	Fighting	Opening animation
Langrisser III	1996	Tactical role-playing game	Opening animation
Money Puzzle Exchanger	1997	Puzzle	Opening animation
Guilty Gear X	2000	Fighting	Opening animation
Shining Force EXA	2007	Action role-playing game	Opening animation
Mega Man ZX Advent	2007	Action, Platform, Metroidvania	Cutscene animation
Lux-Pain	2008	Visual novel	Opening animation
A Certain Scientific Railgun	2011	Visual novel	Cutscene animation
Sol Trigger	2012	Role-playing	Cutscene animation
Golden Time: Vivid Memories	2014	Visual novel	Cutscene animation
The Great Ace Attorney: Adventures	2015	Adventure, Visual novel	Cutscene animation
