= Nanatsu-ya: Shinobu and Her Jewelry Box =

Japanese manga series

- First tankōbon volume cover

七つ屋志のぶの宝石匣 (Nanatsuya Shinobu no Hōsekibako)
- Genre: Mystery
- Manga
- Written by: Tomoko Ninomiya
- Published by: Kodansha
- English publisher: Kodansha
- Imprint: KC Kiss
- Magazine: Kiss
- Original run: November 25, 2013 – present
- Volumes: 28
- Anime television series
- Directed by: Chiaki Kon
- Written by: Seishi Minakami
- Studio: J.C.Staff
- Original run: 2027 – scheduled
- icon

Nanatsu-ya: Shinobu and Her Jewelry Box (Japanese: 七つ屋志のぶの宝石匣, Hepburn: Nanatsuya Shinobu no Hōsekibako) is a Japanese manga series written and illustrated by Tomoko Ninomiya. It began serialization in Kodansha's josei manga magazine Kiss in November 2013. An anime television series produced by J.C.Staff is set to premiere in 2027.

== Plot ==
The once prestigious Kitakami family fell apart for unknown reasons. Akisada Kitakami, the eldest son of the family, was pawned by his grandmother at Kurata-ya, an old pawnshop that existed since the Edo period. The owner of Kurata-ya and Akisada's grandmother made a pact: if Akisada wasn't redeemed within three years, he would have to be engaged to his granddaughter. Years later, Akisada, who hadn't been redeemed and had grown up at Kurata-ya, became a door-to-door service worker at a high-end gem shop and became engaged to Shinobu Kurata, the granddaughter of the former owner. Shinobu possesses a talent for identifying genuine gemstones and a magical ability to discern the "aura" of gemstones. The story revolves around gemstones and pawnshops, unfolding as Akisada searches for the Kitakami family's ruby from his memories.

== Media ==
=== Manga ===
Written and illustrated by Tomoko Ninomiya, Nanatsu-ya: Shinobu and Her Jewelry Box began serialization in Kodansha's josei manga magazine Kiss on November 25, 2013. Its chapters have been compiled into twenty-eight tankōbon volumes as of November 2026.

The series' chapters are published in English on Kodansha's K Manga app.

| No. | Release date | ISBN |
|---|---|---|
| 1 | November 13, 2014 | 978-4-06-340940-6 |
| 2 | November 13, 2015 | 978-4-06-340972-7 |
| 3 | November 11, 2016 | 978-4-06-398004-2 |
| 4 | April 13, 2017 | 978-4-06-398016-5 |
| 5 | September 13, 2017 | 978-4-06-398031-8 |
| 6 | January 12, 2018 | 978-4-06-510733-1 |
| 7 | May 11, 2018 | 978-4-06-511484-1 |
| 8 | October 12, 2018 | 978-4-06-513191-6 |
| 9 | September 13, 2019 | 978-4-06-517145-5 |
| 10 | February 13, 2020 | 978-4-06-518767-8 |
| 11 | June 11, 2020 | 978-4-06-519962-6 |
| 12 | October 13, 2020 | 978-4-06-521133-5 |
| 13 | February 12, 2021 | 978-4-06-522429-8 |
| 14 | July 13, 2021 | 978-4-06-524246-9 |
| 15 | November 12, 2021 | 978-4-06-525918-4 |
| 16 | March 11, 2022 | 978-4-06-526929-9 |
| 17 | August 12, 2022 | 978-4-06-528624-1 |
| 18 | February 13, 2023 | 978-4-06-530563-8 |
| 19 | July 13, 2023 | 978-4-06-532155-3 |
| 20 | November 13, 2023 | 978-4-06-533225-2 |
| 21 | March 13, 2024 | 978-4-06-534902-1 |
| 22 | August 9, 2024 | 978-4-06-536616-5 |
| 23 | December 13, 2024 | 978-4-06-537833-5 |
| 24 | May 13, 2025 | 978-4-06-539504-2 |
| 25 | September 12, 2025 | 978-4-06-540801-8 |
| 26 | January 13, 2026 | 978-4-06-542104-8 |
| 27 | June 12, 2026 | 978-4-06-543838-1 |
| 28 | November 13, 2026 | 978-4-06-545192-2 |

=== Anime ===
An anime television series adaptation was announced on November 11, 2026. The series will be produced by J.C.Staff and directed by Chiaki Kon, with Seishi Minakami handling series composition and Mai Furuki designing the characters. It is set to premiere in 2027.

=== Other ===
In November 2021, in commemoration of the 30th anniversary of Kiss magazine, the series, alongside seven other series, collaborated with the boy band Be:First. In 2022, the series was featured in an exhibit about jewels at the National Museum of Nature and Science in Tokyo. In June 2025, in commemoration of the series' 100th chapter, the series had an illustration collaboration with Nodame Cantabile.

== Reception ==
The series was ranked 40th in Da Vinci magazine's "Book of the Year" ranking in 2020.
