= Yagami =

Yagami (Usually written as 八神 "eight, god") is a Japanese surname. Notable people with the surname include:

- Chitose Yagami (八神 千歳, Yagami Chitose), Japanese manga artist
- Hiroki Yagami (八神 ひろき, Yagami Hiroki) (born 1967), Japanese manga artist
- Junko Yagami (八神 純子, Yagami Junko) (born 1958), a popular Japanese recording artist
- Ken Yagami (八神 健, Yagami Ken) (born 1966), Japanese manga artist
- Yagami Toll (born 1962), drummer for the Japanese rock band BUCK-TICK since 1985
- Yu Yagami (矢上 裕, Yagami Yū) (born 1969), Japanese manga artist

Fictional characters:

- Iori Yagami (八神 庵, Yagami Iori), Video game character from The King of Fighters series
- Hayate Yagami (八神 はやて, Yagami Hayate), Fictional character from the sequels to the Japanese anime series Magical Girl Lyrical Nanoha, A's and StrikerS
- Taichi Yagami (八神 太一, Yagami Taichi, Taichi "Tai" Kamiya) and Hikari Yagami (八神 ヒカリ, Yagami Hikari, Hikari "Kari" Kamiya), DigiDestined characters of Digimon
- Ibuki Yagami (八神 いぶき, Yagami Ibuki) - Fictional character from the Japanese manga and anime series Maison Ikkoku
- Kō Yagami (八神 コウ), a character in the manga series New Game!
- Light Yagami (夜神 月, Yagami Raito), Soichiro Yagami, Sachiko Yagami, and Sayu Yagami - Fictional characters from the Japanese manga and anime series Death Note

- Note that the kanji characters used in this case are different - 夜神 means "night, god"

- Coco Yagami (八神 ココ, Yagami Koko) - Fictional character from the visual novel Ever17 ~the out of infinity~
- Kazuma Yagami (八神 和麻, Yagami Kazuma), Fictional character from the Light novel, manga and anime series, Kaze no Stigma, also known as Stigma of the Wind.
- Takayuki Yagami (八神 隆之, Yagami Takayuki), Fictional character from the video game Judgment and its sequel. A spin-off series from Yakuza.
- Takuya Yagami (八神 拓也, Yagami Takuya), Fictional character from the light novel Yōkoso Jitsuryoku Shijō Shugi no Kyōshitsu e.

== See also ==
- 9788 Yagami, outer main-belt asteroid
- Yagami, Tokyo (矢上), neighborhood in Tokyo, Japan, near Keio University
- Yagami Station
