= Aoi Futaba =

Aoi Futaba may refer to:

- Aoi Futaba, a character in the manga series You're Under Arrest
- Aoi Futaba, a character in the anime television series Vividred Operation
- Futaba Aoi, Japanese manga artist
