= Level C =

Manga and direct-to-video anime

- Level-C
- Cover of the first Japanese manga volume
- Genre: Yaoi
- Manga
- Written by: Futaba Aoi; Mitsuba Kurenai
- Published by: Biblos
- English publisher: NA: Media Blasters
- Magazine: Be × Boy Gold
- Original run: August 1993 – January 1996
- Volumes: 6
- Original video animation
- Directed by: Yorifusa Yamaguchi
- Studio: J.C.Staff
- Licensed by: NA: Kitty Media
- Released: July 14, 1995
- Runtime: 30 minutes

Level C is a Japanese manga series written and illustrated by Futaba Aoi and Mitsuba Kurenai. The manga is licensed in North America by Media Blasters. It has also been made into an original video animation by J.C.Staff. It is the dramatic tale of a relationship between a salaryman and a high school-aged male model.

== Plot ==
Mizuki Shinohara is a male teenage fashion model who lives on his own in a very nice apartment and is still in high school. An adult business man named Kazuomi Honjou had just broke up with his girlfriend and had been kicked out of her house leaving him homeless and having nowhere else to go, then he sets out to find someone new to live with and sees Mizuki on the street. Kazuomi thinks Mizuki is cute and asks to stay with him in exchange for great pleasurable sex. Mizuki thinks he is joking until they are at his apartment later that night and Kazuomi makes good on his promise.

== Characters ==
Mizuki Shinohara (篠原 水木, Shinohara Mizuki)

- Voiced by: Akira Ishida

Kazuomi Honjou (本庄 一臣, Honjou Kazuomi)

- Voiced by: Shinichiro Miki

Minoru Shinohara (篠原 みのる, Shinohara Minoru)

- Voiced by: Takehito Koyasu

Haruno Yoroi (鎧 はるな, Yoroi Haruna)

- Voiced by: Rica Fukami

== Media ==
=== Manga ===
Level C is written and illustrated by Futaba Aoi and Mitsuba Kurenai. The manga is licensed in North America by Media Blasters. Biblos released the manga's three tankōbon between August 1993 and January 1996. Media Blasters released the manga in six tankōbon volumes between March 15, 2005, and May 31, 2006.

=== OVA ===
Directed by Yorifusa Yamaguchi the OVA titled Keiraku no Houteishiki Level-C (快楽の方程式 Level-C; lit. "Pleasure Education Level-C") was released by J.C.Staff in 1995. The OVA has been licensed in North America by Kitty Media and in Germany by Anime-House. The ending theme of the series is "Only Two Men's Eternity" by Yasuhiro Mizushima. The OVA was originally released in Japan on May 24, 1996, in VHS format. It was released in DVD format on March 25, 2005.

== Production ==
Level C started as a doujinshi in 1989. The individual chapters were compiled into six tankōbon volumes in 1993. Frank Panonne of Media Blasters said that "Level C will be uncut, all characters portrayed having sex or in the nude will be depicted as aged 18 or older." The original Japanese version depicts the protagonist as a high-school student. Level C will be shrink wrapped when released. The bankruptcy of Biblos on April 5, 2006, will not affect the production of Level C "at least until the contracts expire".

== Reception ==
Mike Dungan of Mania.com comments on the varying styles of art in the manga since the chapters were not written in order. He commends the art by saying "the art reproduction is more than serviceable, with some nice detailwork making the transition from tankouban to graphic novel, and nicely done reproduction of the screentoning."

Chris Beveridge of Mania.com comments on the hard subtitling of the OVA and lack of a menu "forces them to front-load the trailers for other shows". He also comments on the "auto-repeat mode" when the end of the last chapter is reached. THEM Anime Reviews criticises the OVA for a lack of plot.
