= Nanaka 6/17 =

Japanese anime and manga series

- Cover of the first manga volume

ななか6/17 (Nanaka Jūnana-bun no Roku)
- Genre: Comedy, magical girl
- Manga
- Written by: Ken Yagami
- Published by: Akita Shoten
- English publisher: NA: Studio Ironcat
- Imprint: Shōnen Champion Comics
- Magazine: Weekly Shōnen Champion
- Original run: 2000 – 2003
- Volumes: 12
- Anime television series
- Directed by: Hiroaki Sakurai
- Produced by: Nobuhiro Osawa; Tomohiro Ogawa; Yūji Matsukura
- Written by: Tomoko Konparu
- Music by: Toshio Masuda; Double Oats
- Studio: J.C.Staff
- Licensed by: NA: Section23 Films
- Original network: TV Tokyo
- English network: NA: Anime Network
- Original run: 8 January 2003 – 26 March 2003
- Episodes: 12 + OVA

Nanaka 6/17 (ななか6/17, Nanaka Jūnana-bun no Roku) is a Japanese manga series written and illustrated by Ken Yagami. The manga was published by Akita Shoten between 2000 and 2003, with the chapters collected into 12 tankōbon volumes. An anime television series adaptation, animated by J.C.Staff, aired on TV Tokyo from January to March 2003. In 2004, the anime series was licensed for distribution in North America by ADV Films and released on DVD in 2006.

== Story ==
The story focuses on the cold and distant seventeen-year-old Nanaka Kirisato, a girl who cares only about studying and getting accepted into a good college. Her childhood friend Nenji Nagihara does not care much about school and often gets into fights. At the start of the story, Nanaka berates Nenji for fighting and tells him he needs to grow up. After Nenji tells her that he never wants to see her again, Nanaka is devastated and later falls down a flight of stairs. She loses her memories and suffers from regression, acting as though she is six years old. She also believes that Nenji made a wish to become an adult like her. Nenji ends up having to watch over her as she attends high school, leading to trouble and comedic situations.

== Characters ==
=== Main ===
- Nanaka Kirisato (霧里七華)

Voiced by: Chiemi Chiba (Japanese); Monica Rial (English)
The female protagonist and title character, Nanaka is a senior high school student. For her, studying is the most important thing in the world so she has few friends. One day, after a fight with Nenji, she falls down a flight of stairs. This is what causes her memory to be lost back to the time when she was 6 years old. This 6-year-old Nanaka is a very spirited troublemaker and is obsessed with a children's anime television-show called Magical Domiko. The 6-year-old Nanaka is fond of saying the nonsensical words "hayaya" and "hawawa", and is recognizable by her side pigtail and wider eyes.

- Nenji Nagihara (凪原稔二)

Voiced by: Kenichi Suzumura (Japanese); Chris Patton (English)
The male protagonist, Nenji is Nanaka's classmate and childhood friend. He is a delinquent, but after Nanaka's accident, he seems to settle down quite a bit. Nanaka's father asks him to keep Nanaka's accident secret from other people and take care of her at school. Nenji is occasionally referred to as 'Wild Hair Nenji' by some of the other characters because he has long, spiky hair reminiscent of certain stylized Shōnen anime characters.

- Yuriko Amemiya (雨宮ゆり子)

Voiced by: Yui Horie (Japanese); Kira Vincent-Davis (English)
Yuriko is Nanaka's classmate. Usually called by her last name by other students, she is an honor student, and the role model of a group of girls who dislike Nanaka. She is strict with Nanaka, but discovers Nanaka's secret by accident. Nenji entrusts her to help to keep Nanaka's secret. As she gets to know them both better, she falls in love with Nenji and also becomes kinder to Nanaka.

=== Supporting characters ===
- Jinpachi Arashiyama (嵐山甚八)

Voiced by: Tomoyuki Shimura (Japanese); Christopher Ayres (English)
Jinpachi is a delinquent and Nenji's rival. He fights Nenji but always loses. When Nenji acts more mature, he gets irritated, however, when he encounters Nanaka acting as a six-year-old, he is charmed by her attitude and falls in love with her. He is the heir to the Arashiyama Dojo but is perceived by his younger sister Satsuki as not being serious about it and is often punished by her surprise attacks.

- Satsuki Arashiyama (嵐山五月)

Voiced by: Kaori Nazuka (Japanese); Jessica Boone (English)
Satsuki is Jinpachi's younger sister who is often seen with a wooden sword. She initially perceives Nanaka as a hussy for making Jinpachi act all weird around her, so she tries to attack Nanaka, but Nanaka unintentionally dodges her attacks easily. After Nanaka "saves" her from a falling wooden piece, she begs for her forgiveness and wants to be her disciple and she can address Nanaka as "onee-sama" (big sister). She then "trains" Jinpachi harder so he can be a worthy suitor for Nanaka. Her attack catchphrase is "You're wide open!"

- Kuriko Aratama (霰玉九里子)

Voiced by: Sakura Nogawa (Japanese); Sasha Paysinger (English)
Kuriko is a kindergartner with blonde twin-tailed hair. She has a major crush on Nenji because he rescued her from some bullies and because he resembles her older brother who is away for school. She often fights with her rival Nanaka.

- Taizo Kirisato (霧里耐三)

Voiced by: Takashi Matsuyama (Japanese); John Swasey (English)
Taizo is Nanaka's father. Although he is sad that Nanaka is hurt, he is glad to have a chance to be close with his youthful daughter again.

- Yoshida (吉田)

Voiced by: Nobuyuki Hiyama (Japanese); Greg Ayres (English)
Yoshida is Nanaka's classmate and an avid collector of anime merchandise. He befriends Nanaka after noticing the Magical Domiko toy that she brings to school. Nobody knows who he is until he helps take care of Nenji when he is sick.

- Chie Kazamatsuri (千絵風祭)

Voiced by: Saeko Chiba (Japanese); Nancy Novotny (English)
Chie is Nanaka's classmate and one of the mean girls who make up rumors about Nanaka. She has brown hair that she wears in twin tails and regularly converses with classmate Mari Tsuyuki who has a ponytail. Towards the end of the series, she has a change of heart at the events leading to the class play where Nanaka replies that she values her feedback and then chooses her to play its starring character.

=== Magical Domiko characters ===
- Magical Domiko (まじかるドミ子)

Voiced by: Asami Sanada (Japanese); Luci Christian (English)
Magical Domiko is the magical girl heroine and title character of a very popular children's anime. She uses magic to transform herself into a grown-up and assumes different professions to save the day. Nanaka is a big fan of this anime. Each Nanaka 6/17 episode features a vignette about how she finds the true way to use magic, but Pikota never takes her seriously. Her real name is revealed to be Miko Shishido (宍戸美子).

- Pikota (ピコ太)

Voiced by: Mika Kanai (Japanese); Tiffany Grant (English)
Pikota is a bunny-like fairy mascot from the magical world who assists Magical Domiko. Its real name is "Pikoto" and it resents the misnomer by Magical Domiko.

- Chemical Kemiko (ケミカルケミコ)

Voiced by: Sanae Kobayashi (Japanese); Nancy Novotny (English)
Chemical Kemiko is a green-haired magical girl and Magical Domiko's main rival. She is older and bigger than Magical Domiko and rides on an upright vacuum cleaner. In one of Magical Domiko's short scenes at the end of the episode, she says she has a new anime where she is a future queen of a magical land, and that the evil spirit of Magical Domiko is hurting her kind spirit, but Magical Domiko and Pikota do not believe her.

== Media ==
=== Manga ===
Nanaka 6/17 (ななか6/17, Nanaka Jūnana-bun no Roku) is a 12-tankōbon manga series created by Ken Yagami. The manga was published by Akita Shoten in 2001. The manga was initially licensed by Studio Ironcat for publication in North America but all plans on release were dropped with the company's bankruptcy.

=== Anime ===
The manga series was adapted into 12-episode anime television series that was broadcast in Japan on TV Tokyo in 2003. An additional OVA "episode 13" was also produced but not broadcast with the original TV series.

==== North American releases ====
In 2004 the anime series was licensed for distribution in North America by ADV Films. ADV Films produced an English language version and released the 12-episode TV series and the OVA episode in three DVD volumes in 2006 and as a complete DVD collection of all episodes in 2008.

- Nanaka 6/17 - Not So Magical Mishap, DVD volume 1, episodes 1–4, release date:2006-05-23
- Nanaka 6/17 - Reality! Rivalry! Ridicule!, DVD volume 2, episodes 5–8, release date:2006-07-18
- Nanaka 6/17 - Nanaka vs Nanaka!, DVD volume 3, episodes 9-12 and OVA episode 13, release date:2006-09-12
- Nanaka 6/17 - Complete Collection, episodes 1-12 and OVA episode 13, release date:2008-12-23

The North American license is now held by Section23 Films. All 13 episodes of the ADV Films English version (only) are posted on the Anime Network website for online streaming.

=== Theme songs ===
Opening

Sunao na Mama (素直なまま) by Funta

Ending

Taisetsu na Negai (大切な願い) by CooRie

==== Episode list ====
No.	Title	Original release date
1	"Nanaka Kirisato, 6 Years Old" "Kirisato Nanaka Roku-sai!" (きりさとななか、6さい!)	January 8, 2003
Self-centered seventeen-year-old Nanaka Kirisato scolds her friend Nenji Nagihara for being immature. When Nenji threatens to end their childhood friendship, Nanaka is shocked and falls down an outdoor staircase. Nanaka wakes up in the hospital, only for Nenji to learn that Nanaka has the mind of a spirited six-year-old girl. She believes that they both "transformed" into adults together. Nenji and Nanaka's father Taizo Kirisato are informed by the doctor that Nanaka suffers from regression. Because of his old age, Taizo requests Nenji to watch over Nanaka. Nenji later finds out that Nanaka has gone missing at the hospital. He finds her at their old kindergarten school, and he acts mature by consoling her. Back at Nanaka's house, Nenji is surprised when Nanaka finishes a first-grade math workbook on her own.
2	"Nanaka the Pianist" "Pianisuto Nanaka" (ピアニストななか)	January 15, 2003
Honor student Yuriko Amemiya is asked by the sophomore class to play the piano accompaniment for the choral competition. Although Nanaka is inexperienced at playing the piano, she gladly volunteers to play the piano accompaniment in place of Yuriko. Nanaka takes piano lessons at Yuriko's house after school, though Yuriko is annoyed that Nanaka thinks playing the piano is fun. Learning that Nanaka practiced the piano accompaniment in the school music room, Yuriko gathers the sophomore class for choral practice, causing Nanaka to suffer from performance anxiety. After Yuriko takes over and plays the piano accompaniment, she realizes that Nanaka's fingers are bruised from practicing. Nenji asks why Yuriko is making Nanaka play the piano accompaniment, and Yuriko admits that she considered giving up on her dream of becoming a professional pianist. Later at Yuriko's house, Yuriko composes an easier arrangement of the piano accompaniment for Nanaka to practice. During the choral competition, Nanaka plays the piano accompaniment perfectly on stage. Afterwards, Yuriko tells Nanaka that she decided to enter a piano competition, while Nanaka states that Nenji is her childhood friend.
3	"Nanaka the Big Sister" "Onee-sama Nanaka" (おねえさまななか)	January 22, 2003
After losing a fight against Nenji, delinquent Jinpachi Arashiyama is forced to sport Nenji's spiky hairstyle as part of a wager. When Nanaka accidentally breaks her eyeglasses in the streets, she mistakes Jinpachi for Nenji and soon asks for his help. Treating it like a play date, Jinpachi takes Nanaka to an eyewear retailer before visiting a toy store, an ice cream parlor and an amusement arcade, which unfortunately lightens his wallet. At a park, Nanaka prepares to play hide-and-seek, but Jinpachi had the impression that she wanted to be kissed. Later on, Jinpachi sports a buzz cut. Jinpachi's younger sister Satsuki Arashiyama is not pleased that Jinpachi has fallen in love with Nanaka. Satsuki swings her wooden sword at Nanaka in the streets, but Nanaka inadvertently dodges the attacks. On the way to school, Satsuki successfully hits Nenji and then tries to attack Nanaka near a mailbox, consequently breaking the tip of the wooden sword. Nanaka accidentally trips and falls onto Satsuki, coincidentally saving Satsuki from being impaled by the falling wooden piece. Begging for forgiveness, Satsuki asks Nanaka to be her big sister. Satsuki later trains Jinpachi to be a worthy suitor for Nanaka.
4	"Nanaka: Three Good Friends" "3-nin Nakayoshi Nanaka" (3人なかよしななか)	January 29, 2003
When Yuriko returns home from school, she recalls how Nenji has changed over the years. Yuriko catches a cold and visits the hospital, where she eavesdrops on Nenji talking to the doctor about the impact that Nanaka's regression has on her school life. After Nenji requests Yuriko to keep Nanaka's regression a secret, Nenji begs Yuriko to help Nanaka have a normal school life, though Yuriko initially refuses to help. At school, some schoolgirls, led by conceited classmate Chie Kazamatsuri, steal Nanaka's school uniform in the girl's locker room after physical education class. Yuriko has an eventual change of heart and covers for Nanaka, soon discovering that one of the schoolgirls was wearing Nanaka's school uniform. On the school rooftop, Yuriko confronts Nanaka, saying that Nanaka should not occupy all of her time with Nenji. After Yuriko admits that she likes Nenji, Nanaka misinterprets this as the three of them being best friends. Nenji shares an umbrella with Yuriko, as he walks her home from school in the rain.
5	"Nanaka and the Three-Person Date" "3-nin Dehto Nanaka" (3人デートななか)	February 12, 2003
When Nenji saves kindergartner Kuriko Aratama from a street bully, Kuriko becomes hospitable to Nenji at her house since he resembles her big brother. After school, Nanaka feels dejected when Kuriko takes Nenji to the ice cream parlor. Though planning to watch a movie with Nanaka, Nenji is stalled when Kuriko misplaces her wallet, later realizing that it was in her fanny pack. Nanaka becomes upset when she sees Nenji and Kuriko together. After Nenji tells Nanaka to grow up, she takes it seriously and tries to study hard. Nenji later tells Kuriko that she would miss out on all the fun things if she rushed trying to grow up. On the school rooftop, Yuriko informs Nanaka that she was experiencing jealousy. When Nanaka and Kuriko fight over who gets to take Nenji to an amusement park, Nenji convinces both of them to accompany him on a three-person date. After they enjoy the attractions all day, Nanaka and Kuriko compete over who likes Nenji more. When they leave the amusement park, Nenji promises to take Nanaka back to the amusement park again someday.
6	"Nanaka and the School Trip" "Shūga Kuryokō Nanaka" (修学旅行ななか)	February 12, 2003
As the sophomore class prepare to go on a school trip to Kyoto, Nenji tells an excited Nanaka that Kuriko cannot come with them since Kuriko is a kindergartner. When they visit Ninenzaka, Nanaka becomes traumatized when she gets separated from Nenji at the gift shop. At the inn, Nenji asks Yuriko to help him search for Nanaka. Nenji finds Nanaka at a cherry tree, where Nanaka has surprisingly reverted to her seventeen-year-old self. Recalling when he threatened to end their childhood friendship, Nenji gives Nanaka a handkerchief so she can wipe her tears before they return to the inn together. Chie and her friends notice that Nanaka is studying during the school trip, while Yuriko witnesses Nanaka's self-centered attitude. At Kiyomizu Temple, Nanaka tells Nenji that school trips are a waste of time. Outside of the inn, Nenji learns that Nanaka is secretly mocked by Chie and her friends. Back at the inn, Nanaka figures out that Yuriko really likes Nenji. However, Nanaka says that Nenji is the most precious person in the world to her, much to Yuriko's shock.
7	"Nanaka and the Rest of the Trip" "Ryokō no Tsuduki Nanaka" (旅行の続きななか)	February 19, 2003
Nenji and Yuriko realize things are different now since Nanaka is back to normal. Nanaka continues to hang out with Nenji during the school trip, in which Nanaka notices that Nenji is acting more mature. Later on, Nanaka eventually overhears a conversation between Nenji and Yuriko, in which they are not fond of Nanaka being self-centered. Nenji and Yuriko each search for Nanaka, who has run away. Nenji finds a depressed Nanaka at Kiyomizu Temple, where she says that he was the one who told her to grow up. As he confronts her for being self-centered, she slaps him in the face many times. She faints onto the floor after he informs her that they do not have to know what they will be when they grow up. Nanaka wakes up in the hospital, only for Nenji to learn that Nanaka is back to being a six-year-old girl again. Nenji believes that Nanaka is an important person to him, which catches Yuriko off guard. As Nanaka and Nenji walk back home, Nenji gives Kuriko a box of yatsuhashi as a souvenir. Satsuki continues to train Jinpachi.
8	"Nanaka the Nurse" "Nurse na Nanaka" (ナースなななか)	February 26, 2003
Nanaka and Yuriko learn that Nenji is home alone recovering from a cold. Fellow classmate Yoshida, an avid collector of anime merchandise, befriends Nanaka. Planning to nurse Nenji back to health in his bedroom, Nanaka borrows a nurse uniform from the hospital, Yuriko runs into Yoshida on the way and Kuriko fails to clean up the mess with a vacuum cleaner. Nanaka and Kuriko end up damaging the shower as they fight over who will give Nenji a bath. Seeing Nenji surrounded by girls, Jinpachi feigns dizziness just to be treated by Nanaka. Yuriko witnesses Nanaka and Kuriko arguing over what to cook for Nenji. When Nenji and Jinpachi taste Nanaka's curry concoction, Jinpachi leaves Nenji's house, only to be taken away by Satsuki. Nenji passes out from tasting Kuriko's burnt rice porridge, as Nanaka and Kuriko quarrel over who will feed Nenji some of Yuriko's hot rice porridge, which spills onto Nenji's head. Yoshida comes by for a visit, as he encourages Nanaka, Yuriko and Kuriko to help him clean Nenji's bedroom. Nenji sheds joyful tears, seeing his bedroom spotless. When Nenji takes a nap, Yuriko leaves some rice porridge by his bedside.
9	"Nanaka and the Cultural Festival" "Bunkasai Nanaka" (文化祭ななか)	March 5, 2003
The sophomore class will be performing a play in the auditorium for the upcoming annual cultural festival. As Nanaka suggests her favorite children's anime called Magical Domiko as the program, Chie purposely volunteers Nanaka to be the theatre director and playwright. Nenji and Yuriko view last year's cultural festival class photos, as they discuss how their classroom was made into a pathetic break room. Nanaka suddenly collapses from supposed anemia after viewing a photo of herself, and she is taken to the school clinic. She soon awakens as her seventeen-year-old self. On the school rooftop, Nanaka knows about her other self, asking Nenji which Nanaka that he prefers more, but he likes both of them equally. While Nanaka and Nenji walk home, Yoshida gives Nanaka a reference work collection of Magical Domiko, and Nanaka agrees to be the theatre director and playwright. After Nenji and Taizo discuss Nanaka's current condition, Nanaka reassures Taizo that she is still the same. When the script is finished, Chie critiques it for revision. Nanaka fears that she will collapse again after she creates a cast list. When Nenji prevents a set piece from falling on Nanaka, she faints and becomes a six-year-old girl again.
10	"Nanaka 17 to Nanaka 6" "Nanaka Kara Nanaka" (七華からななか)	March 12, 2003
When Nanaka returns home from clinical testing at the hospital, she finds a letter under her desk written by her seventeen-year-old self. The letter contains the completed cast list, which reveals that Chie is given the leading role. Nenji and Yuriko discuss that Nanaka came up with this contingency plan. With the set built and the rehearsals underway, Chie catches a cold during the cultural festival. As a last-minute change of plans, Nanaka accepts Yoshida's suggestion to take over the leading role. Nanaka trips and falls on the floor after getting performance anxiety. Being reminded by the encouraging letter written by her seventeen-year-old self, she improvises her lines and the play turns out to be successful. Afterwards, Nanaka gives Nenji a letter written by her seventeen-year-old self, who appreciated how much he cares about her but she does not want to lose herself. Nenji and Taizo are informed that the doctor has diagnosed Nanaka with multiple personality disorder, though there is a strong possibility that her two personalities may come together and form a single personality in the near future. After Nenji checks up on Nanaka at her house, he vows to always be by her side.
11	"Domical Nanaka" "Domikaru Nanaka" (ドミかるななか)	March 19, 2003
As Nenji and Yuriko talk about Nanaka's multiple personality disorder, Nanaka overhears that Nenji did not "transform" with her. Yoshida then mentions that Magical Domiko will be airing its final episode. Nanaka starts to wonder if she is going to be treated as a kid instead of an adult. During the final episode, magical girl heroine Magical Domiko is given the opportunity to become a queen, but she tells her bunny-like fairy mascot Pikota that she wants to quit being a magical girl and breaks her wand. During a dream, Nanaka appears as Magical Domiko, Yuriko appears as her rival Chemical Kemiko and Nenji appears as her friend Yuki. Nenji helps Satsuki by rescuing Kuriko from drowning at a riverbank, but Nenji ends up unable to swim after getting a cramp. Determined to save Nenji, Nanaka is able to restore her magic and save Nenji from drowning. Pikota explains that the magic was restored by her courage. After the final episode ends, Taizo is shocked to find out that Nanaka has fainted again. When Nenji arrives, Nanaka has left home. Nenji finds Nanaka at the top of the outdoor staircase.
12	"Nanaka Kirisato 17 Years Old" "Kirisato Nanaka Jūnana-sai" (霧里七華17歳)	March 26, 2003
Seventeen-year-old Nanaka tells Nenji that her six-year-old self might show up one more time. Nanaka returns home and cuts class, rewatching the videotaped final episode of Magical Domiko. On the school rooftop, Yuriko tells Nenji to plan a farewell date. Nenji takes six-year-old Nanaka to the amusement park at night. After they enjoy the attractions, Nanaka faints and awakens as her seventeen-year-old self again. When Nenji realizes that six-year-old Nanaka is gone, Nanaka heads off by herself. She hallucinates as she sees memories of her six-year-old self before reliving the final episode of Magical Domiko. Seventeen-year-old Nanaka finally meets her six-year-old self, as they discuss that Nenji influenced them to grow up with him. Nenji follows Nanaka and prevents her from falling off the outdoor staircase when she faints. Nanaka wakes up in the hospital with Nenji and Taizo at her bedside. As Yuriko swings by with a flower bouquet, Nanaka privately tells Yuriko never to give up on Nenji. Kuriko says goodbye to Nenji and returns home to her big brother, while Jinpachi bumps into a beautiful girl but is taken away by Satsuki. Nenji and Taizo listen to Nanaka play the piano.
13 (OVA)	"Nanaka the Distraction" "Ojama na Nanaka" (おジャマな ななか)	June 17, 2003 (DVD)
After Yuriko tutors him in math after school, Nenji invites her to see a movie together on Sunday, but she believes that he is asking her out on a date. A kung fu film plays at the movie theater, but Yuriko unfortunately runs into six-year-old Nanaka and Taizo. Yuriko feigns dizziness and brings Nenji outside. Encountering Nenji and Yuriko together, Jinpachi is soon taken away by Satsuki. Nenji and Yuriko sit at a cafe, but Yuriko sees Nanaka and Taizo passing by outside. As Nenji and Yuriko then go to a retro toy fair, Yuriko stumbles upon Yoshida. While Nenji checks out some used leather jackets, Yuriko fantasizes Nenji as a rock star. Upon noticing both Chie and Kuriko nearby, Yuriko hides herself and Nenji behind a photo stand-in. At the bookstore, Yuriko grudgingly buys a geology book. Yuriko spots Nanaka outside and distracts her by rolling away a toy inside a gashapon capsule. At the park, Yuriko passes out in front of Nenji. Yuriko wakes up in her bedroom, where she learns that Nenji carried her home on his back. Nenji stays over and eats some snacks. Meanwhile, Nanaka tells Taizo that she had the best day ever.
