= Cat Soup =

2001 film by Tatsuo Satō

- English-language DVD cover

Japanese name
- Kanji: ねこぢる草
Transcriptions
- Revised Hepburn: Nekojiru-Sō
- Directed by: Tatsuo Satō
- Screenplay by: Masaaki Yuasa; Tatsuo Satō
- Story by: Nekojiru
- Produced by: Yuji Matsukura
- Cinematography: Masaru Takase
- Edited by: Kan Onoshima
- Music by: Yutoro Teshikai
- Production company: J.C.Staff
- Distributed by: Starchild Records
- Release date: 21 February 2001
- Running time: 34 minutes
- Country: Japan

Cat Soup (ねこぢる草, Nekojiru-sō; lit. Nekojiru Grass) is a 2001 Japanese animated experimental short film directed by Tatsuo Satō, based on the manga created by Nekojiru. The surreal film follows Nyata, an anthropomorphic kitten, on his travel to the land of the dead and back in an effort to save his sister's soul. Cat Soup was released direct-to-DVD in Japan on 21 February 2001. Central Park Media licensed the film in North America under its Software Sculptors label and was released on DVD on September 9, 2003.

== Plot ==
Nyaako, the older sister of Nyata, lies very ill in her room. By accident, Nyata drowns in the bathtub and, while dead or unconscious, sees his sister leaving the house holding hands with the psychopomp Jizō and follows them. He tries to take his sister back from Jizō but it holds on to her, refusing to let go. Nyaako splits in two, leaving Jizō with half of her soul while her brother runs away with the other half. Afterwards, Jizō decides to reincarnate its half of the soul as a flower and leaves.

Meanwhile, Nyata's father finds him in the bathtub and revives him. The whole family gathers in Nyaako's room, where a doctor pronounces her dead. Nyata approaches carrying the half-soul, and it enters through her nose. She comes back to life, but her eyes are dull and half-open, and she seems half-alive. The siblings are sent out by their mother to retrieve fried tofu. On the way, they attend the Big Whale Circus. During the final act, a giant transparent bird containing a sky and clouds is accidentally popped by members of the audience, causing an all-encompassing flood. The two find refuge on a sampan with a pig. Nyata partially butchers the pig by unzipping it and removing pieces, and cooks the pieces for the group, including the pig, to eat. God holds the world above his head to drain its water down his arm, leaving the three lost in a desert. Nyata hits the pig on the head and cuts off and eats one of the bumps that form, which taste gross and make him throw up. Nyata beats the pig more, and Nyaako joins in, but the pig bites off Nyata's arm. They leave the pig and arrive at a shack, where a woman in a patchwork cloak sews Nyata's arm back on. The siblings leave when they find cat pieces in a sack in the house.

Travelling across the desert, they are brought to a house by the smell of food and are invited inside by a man. They are fed, and when full the man attempts to turn them into soup, attacking them with a pair of scissors. He ends up falling into the cauldron. Nyata reveals that The Man is actually a robot, and cuts him into pieces with the scissors. The cats escape, wandering further across the desert dehydrated, Nyata digs and finds an elephant made of water, which cools them off and travels with them, though the elephant eventually evaporates from the heat. God accidentally stops the flow of time and disrupts space, and the cats play with the time-frozen scenes. Father Time turns time back on, shooting it forward and reversing it, showing various scenes of random events either rapidly going forth in time or back. Eventually, the cats find themselves back on their boat in the ocean. After dusk, they drift into a shallow marsh filled with tin sculptures of plants and mechanical animals. There they chance upon the flower containing the other half of Nyaako's soul. Nyata places the flower on Nyaako's face, which restores her to normal. They go back home.

The entire family of cats is gathered in their house leisurely watching TV. Nyata leaves them to visit the toilet, and while he is gone, the other family members disappear one by one into thin air. The show on the TV also disappears, leaving only a flashing screen behind. Nyata returns to find everyone gone. Outside the nearby lamppost extinguishes, leaving the house in darkness. The film also "turns off", leaving behind a flashing screen of static.

== Background ==
The characters of Nyaako and Nyata first appeared in the June 1990 issue of the monthly manga magazine Garo. They also appeared in a series of 27 two-minute television episodes, collectively titled Nekojiru Gekijō (ねこぢる劇場, Nekojiru Theatre). The series appeared in 1999 as a segment on TV Asahi's Bakushō-Mondai no Boss-Kyara-Ō (爆笑問題のボスキャラ王).

Nekojiru (the artist) was born on January 19, 1967, and died by suicide on May 10, 1998. Her real name was Chiyomi Hashiguchi (橋口 千代美, Hashiguchi Chiyomi; née Nakayama (中山)).

== Reception ==
The Encyclopedia of Science Fiction described Cat Soup as a grotesque and frequently disturbing film that is nevertheless justly regarded as a classic anime. It noted the work's apparent abundance of symbolism, while emphasizing that the filmmakers themselves rejected straightforward symbolic interpretation, with the director's commentary stating that even the creators did not understand why the film developed as it did. The encyclopedia connected its dark tone with the death by suicide of original manga creator Nekojiru, to whom the film was made as a tribute.

== Awards ==
Cat Soup won an Excellence Prize (Animation Division) at the 2001 Japan Media Arts Festival, the "Best Short Film" award at the 2001 Fantasia Festival and the Silver Award for Animation 2003 New York Exposition of Short Film and Video.
