= 87 Clockers =

Japanese manga series

- First tankōbon volume cover
- Manga
- Written by: Tomoko Ninomiya
- Published by: Shueisha
- Magazine: Jump X (June 25, 2011 – October 10, 2014); Weekly Young Jump (December 25, 2014 – June 30, 2016)
- Original run: June 25, 2011 – June 30, 2016
- Volumes: 9
- icon

87 Clockers (stylized as 87CLOCKERS) is a Japanese manga series written and illustrated by Tomoko Ninomiya. It was first serialized in Shueisha's seinen manga magazine Jump X from June 2011 to October 2014, and later in Weekly Young Jump from December 2014 to June 2016.

== Publication ==
Written and illustrated by Tomoko Ninomiya, 87 Clockers was first serialized in Shueisha's seinen manga magazine Jump X from June 25, 2011, to October 10, 2014, when the magazine ceased its publication. The series was transferred to Weekly Young Jump, where it ran from December 25, 2014, to June 30, 2016. Shueisha collected its chapters in nine tankōbon volumes, released from April 10, 2012, to September 16, 2016.

=== Volumes ===
No.	Japanese release date	Japanese ISBN
1	April 10, 2012	978-4-08-879304-7
2	October 10, 2012	978-4-08-879453-2
3	May 10, 2013	978-4-08-879572-0
4	November 8, 2013	978-4-08-879694-9
5	June 10, 2014	978-4-08-879849-3
6	February 19, 2015	978-4-08-890165-7
7	August 19, 2015	978-4-08-890239-5
8	March 18, 2016	978-4-08-890355-2
9	September 21, 2016	978-4-08-890494-8
