= Yorifusa Yamaguchi =

Japanese anime director (1959–2020)

- Born: 1960
- Died: April 11, 2020 (aged 59)
- Other name: Haruka Minami
- Occupation: Director

Yorifusa Yamaguchi (山口 頼房, Yamaguchi Yorifusa) was a Japanese anime director.

== Life and career ==
After graduating from Chuo University's Animation Resource Group, Yamaguchi pursued a career in anime directing, with his debut being the anime production Urusei Yatsura: Nagisa's Fiancé (うる星やつら 渚のフィアンセ, Urusei Yatsura Nagisa no Fianse) which was released December 28, 1988, by Kitty Films. In 1995, he directed the OVA adaptation of the manga Level C. This story of a gay romance was originally released on July 14, 1995. Later that year, he also directed the OAV anime Galaxy Fraulein Yuna: Siren's Sadness, which was released September 21, 1995.

In 2003, Yamaguchi directed the TV series Mouse, which was based on the manga of the same name written by Satoru Akahori. The 2003 twelve-episode series followed the adventures of a young teacher with the alternate identity of the master thief "Mouse".

On April 11, 2020, Yamaguchi died at the age of 59 due to myocardial infarction from a cerebral hemorrhage.

== Filmography ==
- Little Twins: Bokura no Natsu ga Tondeiku (movie), 1992
- Columbus's Great Adventures (OVA), 1993
- Level C (OVA), 1995
- Galaxy Fräulein Yuna: Siren's Sadness (OVA), 1995
- Taro the Space Alien (TV), 2000—2001
- Tantei Shounen Kageman (TV), 2001—2002
- Mouse (TV), 2003
- Zoids: Fuzors (TV), 2004–2005 (chief director, episode 16–26)
- Grandpa Danger (TV), 2004—2005
- Zoids: Genesis (TV), 2005–2006 (animation producer)
