= Doki Doki Majo Shinpan! =

- Developer: SNK Playmore
- Publisher: SNK Playmore
- Platform: Nintendo DS
- Release: JP: July 5, 2007
- Genres: Visual novel, Point-and-click adventure
- Mode: Single Player

Doki Doki Majo Shinpan! (どきどき魔女神判!; lit. "Thump-Thump Witch Judgement", or idiomatically "Heart-Pounding Magical Investigation") is a video game developed by SNK Playmore for Nintendo DS. The player assumes the role of a junior high school student who is asked by an angel to locate a witch that has snuck into his school. In order to find the witch, he must search the suspects' bodies for a "witch mark." The preferred method is by using touch (using the stylus to guide his hands). A sequel titled Doki Doki Majo Shinpan 2 Duo was released 31 July 2008, and a third game titled Doki Majo Plus was released on July 30, 2009.

== Characters ==
Akuji Nishimura (Voiced by: Miku Ozaki)
He is a junior high student hard at work on finding witches.
He is proud to be a bad boy and forced to cooperate by the threat of being changed into a good boy.

Tenshi LuLu (Voiced by: Hiroko Sonoda)
Apprentice angel. She follows the arch-angel's instruction about Akuji, and helps with the witch search.

=== Suspects ===
Maho Akai
14 years old. She has long sugar-pink pigtails and very big breasts. She is in a cheerleading squad. Her ability: Energy balls.
Maria Abe
14 years old. She wears glasses. Crystal-ball fortune-telling is her unique skill. Unlike most other characters, she is not a witch; she is a normal person. Her "abilities": Medicinal flasks and wooden barriers.
Renge Oda
13 years old. She likes retro video games. Her most prized possession is Athena on the Famicom (with cassette tape), which is a clear reference to SNK. Her abilities: Teleportation and a "power sneeze".
Yuuma Mochizuki
13 years old. He takes everything seriously and gets injured (and hospitalized) all the time. His ability: Wolf-man transformation.
Ayame Midoh
15 years old. She is the only daughter of a Shinto shrine and is also a shrine maiden. Her abilities: Summoning familiar spirits and talisman.
Merry Watabiki
12 years old. She is often seen wearing a rabbit costume. Her abilities: Meteors and explosive decoys.
Eve Seiya
23 years old. The school nurse. Her ability: Energy balls.
Noel Seiya
The archangel. Sister of Eve Seiya. Her abilities: Energy balls, summoning holy slugs and holy swords.

=== Other characters ===
Chiyo Daisen
She is in a cheerleading squad; the same one that Maho is in. She has light blue hair.
Reverse-Panda
The color of this type of panda is quite opposite to a usual panda. It hides itself in 100 places throughout the game. The number obtained at the end of the game reveals more episodes in the "Extra Episodes" mode.

== Release ==
Kotaku asked an SNK spokesperson if the game would be released in the US, and the response was "...this title is only for Japanese market. We do not have any plan for localize to the other versions.", despite the game originally having official sites in English, Chinese, and Korean. These were taken offline when the Japanese language site was rewritten to focus on the upcoming sequel game.

A manga adaptation was published in Akita Shoten's "Champion Red" starting in September 2007. It was illustrated by Ken Yagami.

== Reception ==
According to online retailer Amazon.com, the game is the best selling pre-order game in Japan, and is more popular than The Legend of Zelda: Phantom Hourglass. However the actual numbers show that the game met with minimal sales and as of 2009 has only sold 50,000 units. Although the game was never commercially released in North America, it was the subject of a number of webcomics and internet shows. These include:

- A Penny Arcade comic in April 2007.
- Two Dueling Analogs comics, one in March 2008. and another in December 2008
- Used as an example of "child molestation" games in a list of bad types of video games and also mentioned to highlight the cultural differences between the west and Japan in the popular videogame reviews, Zero Punctuation.

The import review in NGamer (like its predecessor NGC Magazine, famous for comical reviews of particularly bad games), was so disturbed by the game that it abandoned its normal percentage scoring system and awarded it a 'score' of simply "NO" in every category. In a later issue (18) it "awarded" it "The Superman 64 Award For Worst Game (of 2007)" (for years, the magazine considered Superman 64 to be the worst game ever made), remarking "There are bad games - technically flawed and conceptually lazy - and then there are bad games. Evil bad. Doki Doki a.k.a. The Meh Witch Touching Project, is one such title." The sequel, however, received 40%, an actual score.

== Sequels ==
=== Doki Doki Majo Shinpan 2 Duo ===
Doki Doki Majo Shinpan 2 Duo
- Developer: SNK Playmore
- Publisher: SNK Playmore
- Platform: Nintendo DS
- Release: JP: July 31, 2008
- Genres: Visual novel, Point-and-click adventure
- Mode: Single Player

Doki Doki Majo Shinpan 2 Duo (どきどき魔女神判2; lit. "Thump-Thump Witch Judgement 2", or more accurately translated as "Heart-Pounding Magical Investigation 2") is the sequel to the Japan-exclusive Doki Doki Majo Shinpan!. A third game titled Doki Majo Plus was released on July 30, 2009.

Similarly to the first game, players determine whether female characters are witches by touching their bodies with the stylus. But the sequel also exhibits new features, such as an enhanced witch-check touching system and microphone input.

The game resumes with Akuji, the main character of the first game, this time in high school. The game is rated D (17 years and over) in Japan by the CERO because of the nudity and sexual references presented in the game.

=== Doki Majo Plus ===
Doki Majo Plus
- Japanese cover art
- Developer: SNK Playmore
- Publisher: SNK Playmore
- Platform: Nintendo DS
- Release: JP: July 30, 2009
- Genres: Visual novel, Point-and-click adventure
- Mode: Single Player

Doki Majo Plus is the third game in the Doki Doki Majo Shinpan! series. Despite being billed as the third game in the series, it's really an enhanced retelling of the original DokiMajo game, featuring a revised soundtrack and a new character. The game was released only in Japan on July 30, 2009.
