= Yōseiki Suikoden =

Light novel and direct-to-video anime

妖世紀水滸伝
- Light novel
- Written by: Hitoshi Yoshioka
- Imprint: Kadokawa Sneaker Bunko
- Volumes: 14
- Original video animation

Suikoden Demon Century
- Directed by: Hiroshi Negishi
- Produced by: Haruki Kadokawa; Makoto Hasegawa; Tomoyuki Miyata
- Music by: Yoichiro Yoshikawa
- Studio: J.C.Staff
- Released: September 25, 1993
- Runtime: 46 minutes

Yōseiki Suikoden (妖世紀水滸伝) is a Japanese light novel series written by Hitoshi Yoshioka. It was adapted into an original video animation film, Suikoden Demon Century, directed by Hiroshi Negishi and released on September 25, 1993. It was released on VHS & LaserDisc in the United States.

== Characters ==
- Takateru
- Amamoto
- Miyuki

== Reception ==
On Anime News Network, Justin Sevakis said of the anime: "Suikoden is appalling. It is the pinnacle of lazy storytelling; the end result of commercialism without the actual commercial appeal."
