= Nodame Cantabile =

Japanese manga series

- Cover art of the first tankōbon volume, featuring Megumi Noda

のだめカンタービレ (Nodame Kantābire)
- Genre: Musical; Romantic comedy
- Manga
- Written by: Tomoko Ninomiya
- Published by: Kodansha
- English publisher: NA: Del Rey Manga (former); Kodansha USA (digital, current)
- Magazine: Kiss
- Original run: 10 July 2001 – 25 August 2010
- Volumes: 25
- Manga parts
- 1. Nodame Cantable (10 July 2001–10 October 2009; 23 volumes); 2. Nodame Cantable: Encore Opera Chapter (10 December 2009–25 August 2010; 2 volumes)
- Television drama
- Directed by: Takeuchi Hideki
- Studio: Fuji Television
- Original network: FNS (Fuji TV)
- Original run: 16 October 2006 – 25 December 2006
- Episodes: 11
- Anime television series
- Directed by: Ken'ichi Kasai
- Written by: Tomoko Konparu
- Music by: Suguru Matsutani
- Studio: J.C.Staff
- Licensed by: AUS: Siren Visual
- Original network: Fuji TV (Noitamina)
- English network: SEA: Animax Asia
- Original run: 11 January 2007 – 26 June 2007
- Episodes: 23 + 1
- Television drama

Nodame Cantabile Shinshun Special in Europe
- Directed by: Takeuchi Hideki
- Original network: Fuji TV
- Original run: 4 January 2008 – 5 January 2008
- Episodes: 2
- Anime television series

Nodame Cantabile: Paris-Hen
- Directed by: Chiaki Kon
- Written by: Yōji Enokido
- Music by: Suguru Matsutani
- Studio: J.C.Staff
- Original network: Fuji TV (Noitamina)
- Original run: 9 October 2008 – 18 December 2008
- Episodes: 11 + 1
- Live-action film

Nodame Cantabile Saishū Gakushō Zen-Pen
- Released: 19 December 2009
- Live-action film

Nodame Cantabile Saishū Gakushō Kou-Hen
- Released: 17 April 2010
- Anime television series

Nodame Cantabile: Finale
- Directed by: Chiaki Kon
- Written by: Kazuki Nakashima
- Music by: Suguru Matsutani
- Studio: J.C.Staff
- Original network: Fuji TV (Noitamina)
- Original run: 14 January 2010 – 25 March 2010
- Episodes: 11 + 2
- icon

Nodame Cantabile (Japanese: のだめカンタービレ, Hepburn: Nodame Kantābire) is a Japanese manga series written and illustrated by Tomoko Ninomiya. It was serialized by Kodansha in the josei manga magazine Kiss from July 2001 to October 2009. A short series, Nodame Cantabile: Encore Opera Chapter, was serialized in the same magazine from December 2009 to August 2010. The overall chapters were collected in 25 tankōbon volumes. In 2016, a one-shot epilogue chapter was published in the same magazine. It was licensed in North America by Del Rey Manga. The series depicts the relationship between two aspiring classical musicians, Megumi "Nodame" Noda and Shinichi Chiaki, as university students and after graduation.

The series has been adapted as four different television series: as an award-winning Japanese live-action drama that aired in 2006 followed by a sequel television special that aired in January 2008, as an anime series spanning three seasons with the first broadcast in 2007, the second in 2008 and the third in 2010. Two live-action movie sequels to the Japanese television drama, with the same actors, were produced with release dates of 18 December 2009 and April 2010. In addition, several soundtrack albums of classical music have been released, as well as three video games. A South Korean drama live action adaptation aired on the KBS network in 2014.

By March 2023, the manga had over 39 million copies in circulation, making it one of the best-selling manga series of all time. It received the 28th Kodansha Manga Award for best shōjo manga in 2004.

== Plot ==
Shinichi Chiaki, an arrogant, multilingual perfectionist, is the top student at Momogaoka College of Music and has secret ambitions to become a conductor. Born into a musical family, he is talented in piano and violin and once lived abroad in the music capitals of the world as a young boy (namely Prague), but is trapped in Japan because of his childhood phobia of airplanes and the ocean. In contrast, Megumi Noda, or "Nodame", is a piano student at Momogaoka, notorious for messiness and eccentric behavior. Despite being very talented, Nodame prefers to play by ear rather than according to the musical score; thus, she is regarded as sloppy and playful.

When they meet by accident, Nodame quickly falls in love, but it takes much longer for Chiaki to even begin to appreciate Nodame's unusual qualities. Their relationship causes them both to develop and grow. Along the way, they meet some crazy people (like Masumi, Mine, and Stresemann) and make lasting friendships. Because of Nodame, Chiaki gets the opportunity to lead a student orchestra and begins to have a broader appreciation of people's musical abilities. Because of Chiaki, Nodame faces her fears and enters a piano competition. Opportunities open up as both begin taking risks, stretching themselves far more than they ever thought possible.

After graduation, Nodame succeeds in curing Chiaki from his phobias and they both move to Paris, where Nodame continues her piano studies at the Conservatoire de Paris while Chiaki starts a professional career as a conductor. In Europe, they encounter new friends and rivals, as well as keep in touch with their friends from Japan.

== Development ==
Tomoko Ninomiya based the character of Megumi Noda on a real-life counterpart with the same name. Ninomiya first learned about the real Noda when the latter, a music college student at the time, posted a photograph of her messy room on a website Ninomiya managed. This inspired her to start a comedy series about a sloppy music student. Ninomiya consults with Noda about musical details, claiming to receive inspiration from her, and thanks Noda in the acknowledgments of every tankōbon volume of Nodame Cantabile. Noda, currently a piano teacher in Fukuoka (the home-town of her fictional counterpart), composed the music and co-wrote (with Ninomiya) the lyrics for the "Fart Song" Nodame plays in the first episode of the anime series, and visited Ninomiya upon the birth of her son.

Ninomiya also based the character of James DePreist, the musical director of the fictional Roux-Marlet Orchestra in Paris, on a real-life counterpart with the same name. James DePreist was permanent conductor of the Tokyo Metropolitan Symphony Orchestra, and conducted the Nodame Orchestra, which provided the music for both the live-action drama and the anime adaptations.

== Media ==
=== Manga ===
Nodame Cantabile, written and illustrated by Tomoko Ninomiya, started in Kodansha's biweekly josei manga (aimed at younger adult women) manga magazine Kiss on 10 July 2001. Starting in May 2008, the serialization changed from biweekly to monthly because of Ninomiya's pregnancy. Serialization went on hiatus starting October 2008 following the birth of her son and Ninomiya's subsequent diagnosis of having carpal tunnel syndrome, but resumed in March 2009 on an irregular schedule depending on her continued recovery. The series finished on 10 October 2009. A short series, titled Nodame Cantabile: Encore Opera Chapter, was serialized in the same magazine from 10 December 2009 to 25 August 2010. Kodansha collected the chapters (including the Encore Opera Chapter chapters) in 25 tankōbon volumes, released from 11 January 2002 to 13 December 2010. Ninomiya published a one-shot chapter, set five years after the last installment, in Kiss on 25 February 2016. It was described as a final coda to Nodame and Chiaki's story.

The manga was licensed in North America by Del Rey Manga, who released 16 volumes from 26 April 2005 to 28 July 2009. In 2016 Kodansha USA announced that they received the rights to the series for digital release. They released the series from 26 July 2016 to 27 June 2017.

=== Live-action drama ===
Nodame Cantabile has been adapted as a live-action television drama broadcast in 11 hour-long episodes from 16 October – 25 December 2006, on Fuji TV, covering events up to volume 9 of the manga. This was followed by a four-hour sequel television special, Nodame Cantabile New Year's Special in Europe, adapting further events in the manga after Chiaki and Nodame move to Paris, broadcast on Fuji TV on 4 and 5 January 2008. These were directed by Hideki Takeuchi from scripts by Rin Etou, and starred Hiroshi Tamaki as Shinichi Chiaki and Juri Ueno as Megumi "Nodame" Noda.

Music direction was by Daisuke Mogi with original music by Takayuki Hattori, with several works of classical music featured in each episode. The orchestral music was performed by Nodame Orchestra, which consisted of members specially selected for the live-action drama with professional support from the Tokyo Metropolitan Symphony Orchestra. The orchestra was conducted by James DePriest, permanent conductor of the Tokyo Metropolitan Orchestra, who would later have his name and likeness used in the Nodame storyline as the musical director of the fictional Roux-Marlet Orchestra. The opening theme for both the drama series and special was the first movement ("Andante Cantabile") from Beethoven's Symphony No. 7, and the ending theme was Gershwin's Rhapsody in Blue, both performed by the Nodame Orchestra conducted by Toshiaki Umeda.

An episode of PuriGorota: Uchū no Yūjō Daibōken (プリごろ太 宇宙の友情大冒険), the fictional anime series that Nodame watches, was created by J.C.Staff for the drama. The anime was written and directed by Ken'ichi Kasai, the director of the first season of the Nodame Cantabile anime. Segments of the PuriGorota anime were shown during episode 4 of the Nodame Cantabile drama, with the complete anime released as a DVD extra with the Nodame Cantabile anime series.

On 4 May 2009, the drama began airing in the Philippines on the GMA Network. In South Korea the drama aired on MBC's cable channel where it achieved peak ratings of 2%, which is a record high for a foreign cable drama.

A South Korean adaptation titled Naeil's Cantabile starring Joo Won, Shim Eun-kyung and Park Bo-gum aired on KBS2 in 2014.

=== Live-action films ===
Two live-action movie sequels to the television drama with the same actors were produced, with the first film being released in December 2009, while the second film was released in April 2010. Filming began in May 2009 and lasted for five months, and included location filming in Vienna.

In Japan, Nodame Cantabile: The Movie I grossed ¥4.1 billion and Nodame Cantabile: The Movie II grossed ¥3.72 billion for a combined ¥7.82 billion, with both among the top ten highest-grossing domestic films of 2010. Nodame Cantabile: The Movie II went on to gross $86,192,740 worldwide, as of 2011.

=== Anime ===
An anime television series, produced by Fuji TV and animated by J.C.Staff, was broadcast on Fuji TV and associated stations in the Noitamina time slot. The first season, titled Nodame Cantabile, was broadcast in 23 episodes from 11 January – 28 June 2007, and the second season, called Nodame Cantabile: Paris Chapter, was broadcast in 11 episodes from 8 October – 18 December 2008. Both seasons were also later aired in Japan on the satellite television network Animax. The first season was directed by Ken'ichi Kasai (the director of the Honey and Clover anime) and the second season by Chiaki Kon, and starred Ayako Kawasumi as Megumi "Nodame" Noda and Tomokazu Seki as Shin'ichi Chiaki. An original video animation (OVA) episode was included with the limited edition volume 22 of the manga when it was published in Japan on 10 August 2009, and a third and final anime season, called Nodame Cantabile: Finale began airing in January 2010.

On 6 February 2009, the series received its English language television premiere on Animax Asia across its networks in Southeast Asia and South Asia, airing the series with its original Japanese audio and English subtitles. and later its air in English Dubbed on 12 June 2009.

The music director for both seasons was Suguru Matsutani. As with the live-action drama, several works of classical music were featured in each episode, performed by the Nodame Orchestra. The opening theme of season one was "Allegro Cantabile" by Suemitsu & The Suemith, and the ending themes were "Konna ni Chikaku de..." by Crystal Kay (episodes 1–12), "Sagittarius" by Suemitsu & the Nodame Orchestra (episodes 13–22), and "Allegro Cantabile" by Suemitsu & The Suemith (episode 23). The opening theme for the second season was "Sky High" by The Gospellers (with melody taken from the Third movement ("Allegro Scherzando") of Rachmaninoff's Piano Concerto No. 2), and the ending theme was "Tokyo et Paris" (東京 et Paris; lit. "Tokyo and Paris") by Emiri Miyamoto x solita (with variations on the theme from Ravel's Boléro). The opening theme for the final season is "Manazashi Daydream" by Yuu Sakai (with variations on the theme from Bach's Jesu, Joy of Man's Desiring) and the ending theme is "Kaze to Oka no Ballad (風と丘のバラード)" by Real Paradis with Nodame Orchestra.

The first season was released on 8 DVDs between April and November 2007. A box set was released in February 2008 with an additional 15-minute original video animation (OVA), taking place between episodes 8 and 9. The first DVD of the second season was released on 24 December 2008.

=== Music ===
Several albums of classical music have been released in association with Nodame Cantabile. Some were promotional tie-ins with the manga, while others are soundtrack albums for the live-action and anime series.

- Nodame Cantabile - Released in September 2003 (ISBN B0000C4GLG), with sections of music by Rachmaninov, Liszt, Brahms, Gershwin, Beethoven, and Chopin that are performed by the characters in the manga series. The performers included the Vienna Philharmonic, London Symphony Orchestra, and Berlin Philharmonic.
- Nodame Cantabile Selection CD Book - Published on 10 August 2005, by Kodansha (ISBN 978-4-06-364646-7) as a book with accompanying CD. The CD includes works by Beethoven, Rachmaninov, Gershwin, Liszt, Mozart, Debussy, Ravel, and Richard Strauss that are performed by characters in the manga series. The book includes commentaries by music critic Sakuma.
- Brahms Symphony Number 1: Nodame Cantabile - Released in September 2005 by King Records (ISBN B000ALJ16S), with recordings of Brahms's Symphony No. 1 and Schubert's Symphony No. 8 "Unfinished", which are performed in the series by the R☆S Orchestra. 50,000 copies had been sold by the end of October 2005, the month after release.
- Nodame Cantabile Selection CD Book vol.2 - Published in August 2006 by Kodansha (ISBN 978-4-06-364666-5), covering music that appeared in the manga series since the release of the first Selection CD Book, including pieces by Berlioz, Ravel, Stravinsky, Franck, Dukas, and Mozart. Included in the book are commentaries by oboist and conductor Daisuke Mogi and music professor Osawa Tetsu.
- Nodame Orchestra LIVE! - Released on 15 November 2006 (ISBN B000I5YAD0) as a 2-CD soundtrack for the live-action drama as performed by the Nodame Orchestra. It included works by Beethoven, Gershwin, Mozart, Brahms, Pablo de Sarasate, Bach, Chopin, Debussy, Stravinsky, and Schubert. This reached number seven on the Oricon album chart.
- Nodame Orchestra STORY! - Released on 21 February 2007 (ISBN B000M7XSPU) as a 2-CD soundtrack from the first season of the anime series, again performed by the Nodame Orchestra. It included works as supposedly performed by the fictional student ensembles S Orchestra, A Orchestra, and R☆S Orchestra. It included works by Beethoven, Mozart, Chopin, Bartók, Dvořák, Gershwin, Rachmaninov, André Jolivet, Listz, Saint-Saëns, Elgar, Bach, Brahms, Schubert, Debussy, Schumann, Stravinsky, and de Sarasate.
- Nodame Cantabile Selection CD Book vol.3 - Released in August 2008 (ISBN 978-4-06-364666-5), covering music that appeared in volumes 16–20 of manga series, since the release of the second Selection CD Book. It included works by Rossini, Chopin, Tchaikovsky, Bach, and Debussy.
- Nodame Cantabile: Paris Chapter - Released on 15 October 2008 (ISBN B001DNF70Q) as a 2-CD soundtrack from the second season of anime series, again performed by the Nodame Orchestra.

In addition, Nodame Cantabile Special BEST! Released in December 2007, a "best-of" compilation of the most popular works from these albums to date.

=== Games ===
Three Nodame Cantabile games have been released in Japan:

- Nodame Cantabile for Nintendo DS, released on 19 April 2007, by Namco Bandai Games.
- Nodame Cantabile for PlayStation 2, released on 19 July 2007, by Banpresto.
- Nodame Cantabile: Dream Orchestra (のだめカンタービレ ドリーム☆オーケストラ) for Wii console, released on 27 December 2007, by Namco Bandai Games.

== Reception ==
The manga of Nodame Cantabile received the 2004 Kodansha Manga Award for best shōjo manga, and was a jury recommendation at both the 2005 and 2008 Japan Media Arts Festivals. It was a finalist for the Tezuka Osamu Cultural Prize in 2005 and 2006, but did not win. In 2006, the English translation was named by the New York Public Library as one of the Books for the Teen Age. The series sold 2.8 million copies in 2008, making it the 8th best-selling manga series in Japan that year. Volume 17 was the third best-selling manga on the Oricon charts for 2007, and volumes 20 and 21 were the 6th and 7th best-selling manga on the Oricon charts for 2008, respectively, selling 1.2 million copies each. According to an Oricon survey men and women aged 10–40, Nodame Cantabile was the second "most interesting" manga series published during 2008. The series and its associated music albums are credited with increasing sales of classical music in Japan. By March 2015, the series had over 37 million copies in circulation. By March 2023, it had over 39 million copies in circulation.

The English translation of Nodame Cantabile has been praised for its quirky, interesting characters, sense of humor, and clean art. Dirk Deppey in The Comics Journal praised Ninomiya's storytelling, saying she "has a solid sense of when to accentuate the highs and lows with just the right note, and understands that one can only do this by not hitting such notes very often", resulting in "an understated soap opera" that is "a seamless and enjoyable storytelling experience." Reviewers have called Ninomiya's character development subtle, while noting it is the character interactions that drive the story, and that "each character has a real and lasting effect on others." Reviewers also cite Ninomiya's ability to depict "scenes of people playing music that no one can hear" and her sense of humor as factors in the series' appeal. Ninomiya has been criticized for not handling transitions between storylines well, for sometimes letting the characters derail the story, and for art and backgrounds that are sometimes too plain. Rachel Thorn criticized the English translation for inaccuracies of tone.

The live-action drama received the 2007 Japanese Drama Academy Awards for Best Drama, Best Lead Actress (Juri Ueno), Best Direction (Hideki Takeuchi), Best Music (Takayuki Hattori), and Best Title Song; the show was also recognized overseas as Best Miniseries at the 2nd Seoul Drama Festival. Juri Ueno also was named Best Newcomer at the Élan d'or Awards for her performance, and the next year was named Best Actress at the International Drama Festival in Tokyo Awards for reprising her role as Nodame in the television special. The New Year's Special in Europe received an average household rating of 20.3% and 21.0% for the two nights it was broadcast in Japan, making it them the highest-rated drama episodes of the week. The first soundtrack album for the drama, Nodame Orchestra LIVE!, reached number seven on the Oricon album chart, breaking the record for highest ranked classical music album.

The opening episode of the anime series broke the record for audience share for its time-slot. The first DVD volume debuted at number 3 on the Oricon chart for anime the week it went on sale.

Although the anime has not been licensed in English, it has still received notice from English reviewers, who praised the character development and chemistry, the balance between drama and comedy, voice acting, and especially the music—both the performances and how it was presented. Reviewers did complain that the visual design of some secondary characters were too similar.

In 2006, a cafe based on Nodame Cantabile opened in Harajuku, Tokyo, including live music from the live-action drama and sets from the show.
