= Nekojiru =

Japanese manga artist

Chiyomi Hashiguchi
- 橋口 千代美
- Nekojiru in 1992
- Born: Chiyomi Nakayama (中山 千代美); January 19, 1967; Kawaguchi, Saitama, Japan
- Died: May 10, 1998 (aged 31); Machida, Tokyo, Japan
- Other name: Nekojiru (ねこぢる)
- Occupation: Manga artist
- Years active: 1990–1998
- Notable work: Nekojiru Udon
- Spouse: Hajime Yamano

Chiyomi Hashiguchi (橋口 千代美, Hashiguchi Chiyomi; née Nakayama (中山), January 19, 1967 – May 10, 1998), known by her pen name Nekojiru (ねこぢる), was a Japanese manga artist. She made her professional debut in 1990 in the monthly manga anthology Garo with Nekojiru Udon, a work that is now widely regarded as her most representative and influential creation.

== Early life ==
Hashiguchi was born on January 19, 1967, into a wealthy family in Kawaguchi, Saitama Prefecture. According to editor Yoshiaki Yoshinaga, she attended a beauty school near her hometown, though details of her formal education remain unclear. As a student, she closely followed new wave music, particularly artists such as EP-4 and TACO.

At the age of 18, Hashiguchi married alternative manga artist Hajime Yamano, assisting his work by shading backgrounds and scenes. During this period, she reportedly had little interest in pursuing a career as a manga artist herself.

== Career ==
Her pseudonym is a portmanteau of Japanese neko, 'cat', and shiru, 'soup'. While Nekojiru absent-mindedly sketched "an odd octopus-like cat", Yamano took interest in her drawings, stating "it had a raw childlike appearance that wasn't filtered through adult eyes – it was cute, repulsive, and cruel-looking all at the same time". Using the sketch as a motif, Yamano wrote a script that Nekojiru illustrated, which would become Nekojiru Udon. Nekojiru was completely self-taught, having received no formal lessons from her husband. The work was brought to Garo and was well-received by editor Maki Takaichi.

Her work would experience a surge in popularity through the subversive manga trend during the mid- to late 1990s. The pop aesthetics and surreal presentation of her work began to appeal to the general public, and teens in particular. The couple took any solicitations for work they could get, resulting in an incredibly arduous workload for both of them.

In April and May 1998, Nekojiru spoke with several editors, complaining about the workload and artistic limitations imposed by the new influx of work. In a call with a Hakusensha editor, she stated, "I'm tired of drawing manga. I want to quit and move to a developing country with my husband".

== Works ==
With the exception of Tsunami, all of Nekojiru's work features the main characters drawn as cats. Even in her manga essays Jirujiru Travel Journal and Jirujiru Diary, she draws herself as a cat. But although her characters are animals, she still situates them within human environments.

Her manga detailing the daily life and adventures of the cats Nyāko and Nyatta are held in high esteem. Childlike zaniness, cruelty, and nostalgia are all major themes in her work. As shown in Dream Memo, included in the posthumously released compilation Nekojiru Udon 3, she based many of her bizarre works of fantasy on her own dream experiences. Psychedelic drugs like magic mushrooms and LSD also often appear in her works.

Yamano Hajime, using the pen-name Nekojiru-y, took over Nekojiru's world and continues to produce new works. A free chapter of Nekojiru's manga was available on the site. At the end of November 2020, it was announced the site would go on hiatus, and it remains down as of July 2023.

There have been two animated adaptations of Nekojiru's manga, both of them focusing on the family of Nyāko, Nyatta and their parents. The first of these, Nekojiru Gekijō (ねこぢる劇場, Nekojiru Theatre), was a 27 × 2 minute series led by comedy duo Bakushō Mondai which aired on Japanese TV in 1999 as one segment of Asahi Television's Bakushō-Mondai no Boss-Kyara-Ō (爆笑問題のボスキャラ王). The second, and more popular, is the 2001 OVA Nekojiru Sō (ねこぢる草, Nekojiru Grass), released in English as Cat Soup.

An English translation of Nekojiru Udon will be published by New York Review Comics on January 12, 2027.

== List of works ==
- Nekojiru Udon (ねこぢるうどん)
- Nekogamisama (ねこ神さま, Cat God)
- Nekojiru Manjū (ねこぢるまんじゅう)
- Nekojiru Dango (ねこぢるだんご)
- Nekojiru Shokudo (ねこぢる食堂, Nekojiru Cafeteria)
- Nekojiru Senbei (ねこぢるせんべい)
- Jirujiru Ryokōki (ぢるぢる旅行記, Jirujiru Travel Journal)
- Jirujiru Nikki (ぢるぢる日記, Jirujiru Diary)

Nekojiru also worked as an illustrator and character designer on other projects.

== Death ==
Hashiguchi died by suicide on May 10, 1998. Her suicide note included: "Forget I even lived"; "I don't need a grave"; and "Don't talk about why I died". She also requested to be buried with all the CD albums made by Aphex Twin, according to a MuzikMusik magazine article. Yamano declined to provide details about motives but denied media allegations that it was a copycat suicide after musician Hide's death. Contrary to her wishes, her family did bury her in a cemetery.

Shortly before her suicide, Nyāko and Nyatta, the two main characters of Nekojiru Udon, were selected to be used by Tokyo Electric in promotional campaigns, but the idea was scrapped due to the death of their creator.
