= Tomoko Ninomiya =

Japanese manga artist

- Born: May 25, 1969 (age 57); Minano, Saitama, Japan
- Occupation: Manga artist
- Known for: Nodame Cantabile
- Website: Tomoko Ninomiya's website

Tomoko Ninomiya (Japanese: 二ノ宮 知子, Hepburn: Ninomiya Tomoko; born May 25, 1969) is a Japanese manga artist, based in Saitama Prefecture, Japan.

== Career ==
In 1989, she made her debut with London Doubt Boys.

She is best known for her series Nodame Cantabile, which received the 2004 Kodansha Manga Award for shōjo manga. Nodame Cantabile has been adapted for television as both live-action dramas broadcast in 2006, 2008, and 2014 and as of 2016, 3 anime seasons.

== Selected works ==
- Torendo no Joou Miho (トレンドの女王ミホ; "Miho, the Queen of Trendiness") (1991–1995), 10 volumes, rereleased in 5 bunkoban volumes
- Tensai Family Company (天才ファミリーカンパニー; "Genius Family Company") (1994–2001), 11 volumes, rereleased in 6 bunkoban volumes
- Heisei Yopparai Kenkyuujo (平成よっぱらい研究所; "Heisei Drunk Research Center") (1995–1996), 1 volume
- Out (OUT) (1995), 1 volume
- Nomini Ikouze!! (飲みにいこうぜ!!; "Let's Go Drinking!!") (1999), 1 volume
- Green (GREEN〜農家のヨメになりたい〜) (1998–2001), 4 volumes
- Nodame Cantabile (のだめカンタービレ, Nodame Kantābire) (2001–2009), 24 volumes
- Onigiri Communication ~Scrap Wood Mama's Diary~ (おにぎり通信 〜ダメママ日記〜) (2011–2015)
- 87 Clockers (エイティセブン・クロッカーズ) (2011–2016)
- Nanatsu-ya: Shinobu and Her Jewelry Box (七つ屋志のぶの宝石匣, Nanatsuya Shinobu no Hōsekibako) (since 2013), 24 volumes (as of May 2025)
