= Futaba Aoi =

Japanese manga artist

Futaba Aoi (葵 二葉, Aoi Futaba) is a manga artist (born December 19). Part of a duo including herself and Mitsuba Kurenai. This is the pen name used for writing extremely adult-oriented yaoi-stories. Real names are Masaki Sano (佐野 真砂輝, Sano Masaki) and Kyou Watanabe (わたなべ 京, Watanabe Kyō). This duo also still works for the dōjinshi market and has published some dōjinshi of their own work.

== Manga works ==
- Level-C - Kairaku no Houteishiki
- West End

=== Person's name Masaki Sano and Kyou Watanabe ===
- Tokyo Guardian
- Fire Emblem
  - Fire Emblem Shiranhen/Soumeihen
  - goo Higashinihondaishinsai support Wallpaper FIRE EMBLEM
- Fire Emblem Gaiden
- Platinum
- GPX Grand prix exceed
- Gadget
- Z/ETA
  - Z/ETA (Drama CD)
- Shiranuimonogatari Hakatayouiki
