= Ken Yagami =

Japanese manga artist

Ken Yagami (八神 健, Yagami Ken, born May 31, 1966 in Hiroshima) is a Japanese manga artist. Yagami is known for writing Nanaka 6/17, serialized in Weekly Shonen Champion from 2001 to 2004.

== Works ==
- Arisa² (2004; Shonen Ace, Kadokawa Shoten)
- Dokidoki Majo Shinpan! (2007; Champion Red, Akita Shoten)
- Dokidoki Majo Shinpan! 2 (2008; Champion Red, Akita Shoten)
- Futaba no Kyoushitsu (2006; Young Animal, Hakusensha)
- Hisoka Returns! (1995; Weekly Shonen Jump, Shueisha)
- Kirin: The Last Unicorn (1997; Weekly Shonen Jump, Shueisha)
- Nanaka 6/17 (2001; Weekly Shonen Champion, Akita Shoten)
