= Rie Aruga =

Japanese manga artist

- 有賀リエ
- Pronunciation: あるが リエ
- Born: Ōmachi, Nagano, Japan
- Occupation: Manga artist
- Years active: 2011-present
- Notable work: Perfect World (manga)
- Awards: Kodansha Manga Award (2019)

Rie Aruga (有賀リエ, あるが リエ, Aruga Rie) is a Japanese mangaka born in Omachi, Japan. She is mainly known for her work Perfect World (パーフェクトワールド).

== Career ==
Aruga dreamed of becoming a manga artist since she was a child, but didn't achieve this until she was in her thirties. Aruga noticed adults in their thirties were submitting works for newcomer manga awards, which encouraged her to pursue her dream. Aruga was still working at a company during this time, and initially kept her manga drawing a secret from her husband.

In 2011, Aruga made her debut with the oneshot Tenmon Kansoku published in Kodansha's Kiss. She won the Kiss Gold Award, a new artist award, at the 6th KissIN for her debut work. Aruga's first serialized work, Oort no Kumo kara, was published in 2013. Since her debut, Aruga's works are primarily published in Kiss.

From 2014 to 2021, Aruga's longest-running work, Perfect World, was serialized in Kiss. In 2018, Perfect World was adapted and released as a live-action film. This was followed by a TV drama adaption in 2019.

== Works ==
- Tenmon Kansoku (天体観測) (2011) – oneshot in Kodansha's Kiss
- Oort no Kumo kara (オールトの雲から) (2013) – serialized in Kiss
- Perfect World (パーフェクトワールド) (2014–2021) – serialized in Kiss
- Koujou Yakei: Aruga Rie Rensakushuu (有賀リエ連作集 工場夜景) (2022) – serialized in Kodansha's Morning
- Sheltering Eaves (零れるよるに) (2022-ongoing) – serialized in Kiss

== Awards ==
In 2016, Perfect World won the Best Shojo Manga Award in the French magazine AnimeLand. In 2019, Aruga won the 43rd Annual Kodansha Manga Awards' Best Shōjo Manga Award for Perfect World.
