= Aoi House =

Harem manga series

- Cover of the first volume
- Author: Adam Arnold
- Illustrator: Shiei
- Current status/schedule: Completed
- Launch date: January 24, 2005
- End date: January 31, 2009
- Publisher: Seven Seas Entertainment
- Genre(s): Comedy, harem
- Rating: Teen
- Followed by: Vampire Cheerleaders

Aoi House is a harem original English-language (OEL) manga series written by Adam Arnold, with art by Shiei, and published by Seven Seas Entertainment. The story follows the misadventures of two down-on-their-luck college guys named Alexis "Alex" Roberts and Sandy Grayson who are thrown out of their college dorm and join an anime club dominated by crazed yaoi fangirls.

== Plot ==
College roommates Alexis "Alex" Roberts and Sandy Grayson have been evicted from their dorm after a series of infractions, the latest involving showing lewd anime, and the antics of Sandy's pet hamster, Echiboo. After seeing a flyer for the anime clubhouse AOI House, the two men believed they found the perfect place. However, the two boys soon learn that the clubhouse consists of five crazed yaoi fangirls who have mistaken Alex and Sandy for a gay couple—the flyer having neglected to mention that only girls and gay guys were permitted and the clubhouse's original name was "Yaoi House", but the "Y" fell off of the clubhouse's sign. Once the truth is revealed that Sandy and Alex are two straight males, the two boys are allowed to stay because the housing committee has been on AOI House's case to get more members. The girls have some fun with Sandy and Alex in an attempt to turn them into yaoi-lovers, or at least make them the lodge's token gay couple.

== Characters ==
=== Major characters ===
Alexis "Alex" Roberts
Morgan's "yaoi-pet", and perhaps the more level-headed between himself and Sandy. He is Sandy's friend and roommate. Along with Sandy, he was kicked out of his dorm because of Sandy's viewing of hentai anime, and the serving of Ramune which Dean Perkins mistook for an alcoholic beverage. It seems that Sandy is in fact Alex's best friend as Alex continues to stand beside Sandy in spite of all the adventures he has faced as a result of just being near Sandy. It also seems he has the exclusive attention of Morgan McKnight, who obviously has a crush on him. At one point in the story the removal of his ponytail makes him look sufficiently like a bishonen to cast a "fangirl" effect over the female cast. But as soon as a snippet of hair was cut, the effect was broken. Becomes stepbrother to Sandy and half-brother to Angela after his father marries Sandy's mother halfway through the series. Marries Morgan in the epilogue and has three kids with her.
Sandy Grayson
Sandy is the owner of Echiboo the hamster, and is also Alex's friend and roommate. Between himself and Alex, Sandy seems the larger otaku and is much more immature. Sandy is also the one that Jessica seems the most interested in, as she calls him "tiger" and teasingly flirts with him. Sandy appears to be a fan of almost all aspects of Japanese culture, or at least the otaku culture as is seen by his drinking of Ramune while viewing anime (he has a Sailor Moon shrine in his room), and likes to imagine different anime scenarios happening in real life. Has a strong dislike of corn after viewing Boku no Sexual Harassment's infamous porn scene involving corn. Becomes stepbrother to Alex and half-brother to Angela due his mother marrying Alex's father. In the epilogue he winds up marrying Maria and has two kids named Helena and Victor.
Echiboo
Echiboo is Sandy's pet hamster. Morgan calls him a "panty hamster" because of the critter's obsession with panties. Echiboo seems to have taken a strong liking to Elle, or at least her panties. He is also one of the causes (by taking the Deans toupee) of Sandy and Alex's need to find new lodging, which eventually led them to Aoi House. Morgan likes to put a tiny camera on his head and let him run amuk, getting footage "of the ecchi kind". Echiboo's name is a pun of Ebichu, the hamster from the Gainax anime series Oruchuban Ebichu. His name also means "Perverted Fart" in Japanese, which is appropriate considering his obsession with panties. Has an attraction to Luna-P (who spurns him at first) and defies all laws of science by having a half pig-half hamster offspring with her called Diana. In the epilogue, he becomes a famous movie star thanks to his role in "Echibond".
Elle Mathers
The most mature of all the girls and very ill-tempered. She comes from a wealthy family and continually acts upset about having Sandy and Alex as a part of Aoi House. She does wear a very interesting costume shortly after their first arrival however and seems to (barely) mellow down toward them as they become part of daily Aoi House life. She even began to develop a crush on Alex, but those feelings ended when he and Morgan became an item. Elle is on the tennis team. In the epilogue, she becomes an "Echi-Bond" girl and a successful actress.
Nina Parker
Nina is the most nonchalant member of Aoi House. She is also seemingly the least concerned about having two straight male housemates, as she at times continues to walk around without her shirt on regardless of the fact that she now has two straight male housemates. She also makes a habit of smoking where she is not supposed to. She is also a member of the swim team and practices synchronized swimming. Adam Arnold stated that Nina is the most "macho" of the Aoi House girls, and she also has the smallest bust. Nina apparently works at Sandy's and Maria's bookstore in the epilogue, but since she is still a slacker, Helena and Victor seem to do her job for her. This attitude is most likely why they let Sanae drag off Nina from time to time.
Morgan McKnight
The most energetic of the group, Morgan is a very hyper girl who seems to be on a continual sugar high and loves candy. Morgan has a playful, childlike innocence about her and how she interacts with Sandy and Alex. In her first meeting with them she claims Alex as her "yaoi pet" and later uses something of Elle's to lead Sandy and Alex on a wild chase that ends in the girl's locker room. Her closest friend who is not an Aoi House member seems to be the mysterious "Oniisan" who she doesn't seem to hesitate in telling her secrets, almost as she would to a diary. Morgan also continues to demonstrate, both in her actions and what she tells her "Oniisan", a very strong attraction to Alex. She is much less energetic when talking to her confidant. She and Alex ultimately start dating in the finale, and they get married in the epilogue with three kids named Timothy, Harley and Ivy. However, married life doesn't entirely take away her mischievous side, as she buys her young son yaoi manga, much to Alex's chagrin.
Jessica Kim
Jessica is a Korean-American medical student often found wearing her nurse outfit, the subject of Sandy's fetishes. She, along with Morgan, accepts Sandy and Alex joining Aoi House. Jessica is almost as playful as Morgan and joins in on one of hers schemes while helping to defend the ever hyper Morgan's desire for candy; both of these might be why she seems to be one of the few that can "control" Morgan. She is very motherly and also teases Sandy, which causes him many a nosebleed. However, she allows Maria and Sandy to hook up during the Con Caper. At this point, she also seems to develop a crush on Mason Blue. She has three little brothers. She achieves her goal of becoming a nurse at Seattle Grace Hospital in the epilogue, where her co-workers and child patients are very fond of her.
Maria Ortega
Along with Sandy and Alex, Maria is one of the newest members of Aoi House. Of Latina descent, she is a little self-conscious about her uncommonly large bust. She is happy to be in Aoi House, and is friendly toward Sandy and Alex, who once helped her shortly after they all joined. Her parents own a local Mexican restaurant which is a place she uses along with the other members of Aoi House to celebrate the new members. She eventually develops feelings for Sandy, whom she marries and has kids with in the epilogue. They run a bookstore called "The Bookcave".

=== Minor characters ===
Oniisan
Somewhat of a mystery for most of the series. "Oniisan" seems to be the one that provides Morgan with an amazing amount of technological equipment including an "Ecchi-cam", a camera that can be strapped to Echiboo's head. "Oniisan" is also possibly Morgan's closest and only true confidant, and has counseled her, and Elle, on their respective attractions to Alex. At the beginning, it was not certain who or what Morgan's Oniisan was, though, Oniisan was eventually revealed in "Diary Room Antics" to be human. The previous theory was that he was some sort of computer (an obelisk labeled "Sound Only", a reference to the anime Neon Genesis Evangelion) with various sound and visual links throughout the house. Oniisan means "big brother" in Japanese, and all the members of Aoi House (and former member Carlo) address him as "oniisan". For the majority of the series, Alex and Sandy are unaware of Oniisan's existence, and the girls of Aoi House seem either unwilling or just have neglected to enlighten them. The top half of his face is always hidden; in Aoi House in Love! Vol. 1, he cosplayed as Tuxedo Kamen of Sailor Moon, so his eyes would be hidden; he later judges a cosplay battle between Aoi and Uri Houses and the UASOS Brigade wearing sunglasses. It has recently been revealed that Oniisan is actually Elle's brother and that his real name is Jacob. As it turns out, he is the one behind Aoi House's creation, whereas Carlo just pitched the idea to him after reading one of his flyers. Jacob is apparently the owner of a production company that was looking to make a new reality series, and with Carlo's suggestion, Aoi House came to fruition. He continues his Aoi House series in the epilogue.
Carlo
Aoi House's homosexual transvestite founder. When Sandy and Alex first meet him/her s/he is dressed as a woman complete with wig and skirt. When the girls arrive and inform them of who Carlo is both Sandy and Alex shockingly learn that the one they thought was a "she" is in fact a "he". It is interesting that though they both have never met him/her, s/he clearly knows about them, indicating that the girls of Aoi House still keep close contact with their former founder. Carlo's face has stereotypical macho qualities. S/he also finds Alex very attractive and went on a date with him when Alex lost a bet. S/he winds up dating a silent boytoy named Rocky, whom s/he ultimately marries in the epilogue.
Mr. Perkins
Dean of the University. Echiboo stole Mr. Perkins's toupee, causing Sandy and Alex to search for new housing, which eventually led them to finding Aoi House. He continues to be somewhat of a problem for Sandy and Alex; he keeps a close on eye them because of the trouble they caused in the past. Mr. Perkins can occasionally be found watching the synchronized swim team practice and talking to the swim coach, Ms. Addison. The epilogue just states that he's on the way to a coronary.
Ms. Addison
Coach of the women's synchronized swim team. Goes on to become an Olympic Swimming Coach in the epilogue.
David, Daniel and Danny
The little triplet brothers of Jessica. During the epilogue, it turns out that one of them becomes a "rebel" with black clothes and nail polish, along with a spiked collar and a mohawk, whereas the other two dress in prep school clothes.
Uri House
Aoi House's rival from Lawndale State University. Their name is based on Yuri, Jessica earlier stating they heard of Aoi House and did a Yuri rip-off. Its current members are:

Mason Blue – The de facto leader of the club. While he does not actually have a definite ending in the epilogue, a man with his earrings greets Jessica at Seattle Grace Hospital with a stethoscope around his neck.

A hooded boy named Kevin Cardenas – In charge of their AMVs and has a thing for Morgan (calling her "McCutie") as well as any girl he sees. Moves to Tokyo in the epilogue just for the girls

A boy with glasses named Dale Stevens – The club's artist. He gets roped into moving to Tokyo along with Kevin in the epilogue.

A girl named Kimberly Ann and her pet pig named Luna-P (A reference of Chibiusa's Luna-P Ball). She goes on to win American Idol numerous time in the epilogue.

The open lesbian Sanae – Has a crush on Nina, as well as calling out that Maria's breasts were bigger than Kimberly Ann's. She kissed Nina at one point during the Con Caper, and somehow got both her and Elle into bed (much to their horror when they wake up the next morning) after the epilogue.

== Publication ==
Aoi House first began as a webcomic written by Adam Arnold and illustrated by Jim Jimenez and initially ran from January 24, 2005 through April 15, 2005. The webcomic was picked up by Seven Seas and was republished with new artwork by Shiei on Seven Seas' Gomanga.com beginning on May 23, 2005. The comic was later serialized in Newtype USA starting with the January 2006 issue. Four graphic novels were published by Seven Seas between May 15, 2006 and June 10, 2008.

== Release history ==
| No. | Title | Release date | ISBN |
|---|---|---|---|
| 1 | Aoi House Vol. 1 | May 31, 2006 | 978-1-933164-12-0 |
Episode 1 – "Arrival"; Episode 2 – "Fangirl's Delight"; Episode 3 – "Echiboo's Big Adventure: Phase 1"; Episode 4 – "Echiboo's Big Adventure: Phase 2"; Episode 5 – "Mallpisode"; Episode 6 – "Food Courtin'"; Episode 7 – "Arcade Showdown"
| 2 | Aoi House Vol. 2 – Fun & Games | December 15, 2006 | 978-1-933164-30-4 |
Episode 8 – "Playful Secrets"; Episode 9 – "A Date to Remember"; Episode 10 – "Charmed"; Episode 11 – "Movie Magic"; Side Story – "Fruit Cake Fantasy"; Episode 12 – "The Nightmare Before Christmas"; Episode 13 – "Evergreen Party Night"; The Lost Scene
| 3 | Aoi House in Love! Vol. 1 – "The Great Con Caper" | July 24, 2007 | 978-1-933164-51-9 |
Episode 1 – "Aoi House Hits the Road"; Episode 2 – "Check-In Time"; Episode 3 – "Rival Schools"; Episode 4 – "D for Drama"; Episode 5 – "Mr. Wonderful"; Episode 6 – "Midnight Rebirth"; Episode 7 – "Yaoi 801"; Episode 8 – "Cosplay Complex"; Episode 9 – "Twilight"
| 4 | Aoi House in Love! Vol. 2 – "Happy Endings" | June 10, 2008 | 978-1-933164-96-0 |
Episode 10 – "Many Happy Returns"; Episode 11 – "Lost and Lonely Souls"; Episode 12 – "This is Not Happening"; Episode 13 – "Bewitched, Bothered and Bewildered"; Episode 14 – "Series Finale"; Side Story – "Bond, Echibond"; Epilogue – "Where Are They Now?"

== Related media ==
=== Music video ===
On December 4, 2006, Seven Seas Entertainment released a Flash animated music video dedicated to Aoi House to YouTube, Newgrounds, and Gomanga.com. Aoi House: The Music Video was animated by Jonathan Talas and set to the Aoi House Theme Song – "Itsumo Futaride" by The J Brothers. The music video received 150,000 views during its first week and was listed on YouTube's "Top Favorites (This Week) in Arts & Animation". It was also awarded Newgrounds's "Daily 2nd Place" award in December 2006. The music video was featured on the bonus DVD of April 2007 issue of Newtype USA.

=== Spin-offs ===
On March 17, 2010, Seven Seas announced the creation of the comedy manga Paranormal Mystery Squad, an Aoi House spin-off featuring Stephanie and Katie Kane, which will be written by Arnold Arnold and illustrated by Comipa, and will appear as a double-feature with the comedy Vampire Cheerleaders (written by Arnold and illustrated by Aoi House artist Shiei) as Vampire Cheerleaders: Vol. 1.

== Reception ==
Carlo Santos of Anime News Network stated that Aoi House was a "fun, fast reading, much like the comedies it borrows from". However, he criticized the work for "[stumbling] in its search for parody". IGN's A. E. Sparrow praised the comic as a must read for anyone who is a fan of harem manga and included Aoi House in the top ten manga of 2006. Matthew Alexander, writing for The Fandom Post, stated that while the artwork was passable, the writing really shines. He enjoyed the humor of having two straight guys living with hot girls who only enjoys anime featuring male homosexuality. PopCultureShock gave Aoi House a positive review, stating that the crazy and perverse female house members is what makes the series so much fun.
