= Yu-ki Matsumura =

Japanese actor

- 松村 雄基
- Born: Noriyuki Matsumura; 7 November 1963 (age 62); Bunkyō, Tokyo, Japan
- Occupation: Actor
- Years active: 1980–present
- Television: Furyō Shōjo to Yobarete; School Wars; Chishimai; Ponytail wa Furimukanai; Shinano no Colombo Jiken File <Nakamura ver.>

Yu-ki Matsumura (松村 雄基, Matsumura Yūki; born Noriyuki Matsumura (松村 憲幸, Matsumura Noriyuki), 7 November 1963) is a Japanese actor who has appeared in nine feature films, as well as a number of television series and theater productions. He is also a singer and has released eight albums and eight singles. He is represented with All-Stars Company.

== Biography ==
Yu-ki Matsumura was born in Bunkyō, Tokyo. While attending Tokyo Metropolitan Itabashi High School, he made his debut with the role of Shigetoshi Okita in the television drama Seito Shokun!.

He had a role in the television series Shōjo ga Otona ni naru Toki Sono Hosoki Michi broadcast in 1984. After that, he continued regular appearances on the television series Furyō Shōjo to Yobarete and School Wars, and in the 1980s he worked as a regular actor of Daiei dramas. He also appeared on the television series Ponytail wa Furimukanai, Furyō Shōjo to Yobarete and Chishimai, and Hanayomeishō wa Dare ga Kiru.

He made his music recording debut with CBS Sony in 1981. He has released eight albums and eight singles. His singing activities were paused for a while, but he resumed them in 2006 and has continued his live performances which are mainly in Tokyo and Osako.

He is a swordsmith and also a calligrapher. At the age of 30, he was apprenticed to Gyokukan Saotome and started writing. He received the Prime Minister's Prize at the 17th Tokyo Document Exhibition (sponsored by Tokyo Shimbun).

== Appearances ==
=== TV dramas ===
- Seito Shokun! (1980, EX) – as Shigetoshi Okita
- Bokura no Jidai (1981, TBS)
- Darekaga Watashi o Aishiteru (1983, TBS) – as Takashi Saijo
- Jiken Kisha Chabo (1983, NTV)
- Shōjo ga Otona ni naru Toki Sono Hosoki Michi (1984, TBS) – as Shinya Ichijo
- Furyō Shōjo to Yobarete (1984, TBS) – as Asao Nishimura
- Kinō, Kanashibetsu de (1984, NTV)
- School Wars (1984–85, TBS) – as Daisuke Oki
  - School Wars 2 (1990–91) – as Daisuke Oki
- Chishimai (1985, TBS) – as Michio Tanabe
- Ponytail wa Furimukanai (1985–86, TBS) – as Akira Tamaru
- Hanayomeishō wa Dare ga Kiru (1986, CX)
- Aitsu to Watashi (1986, CX)
- Onna Fūrin Kazan (1986–87, TBS)
- Alyes no Otome-tachi (1987, CX)
- Ohima nara Kiteyone (1987, CX)
- Tabaruzaka (1987, NTV)
- The School Cop (1988, CX)
- Onna-tachi no Hyakumangoku (1988, NTV)
- Goryōkaku (1988, NTV)
- Yabō no Kuni (1989, NTV)
- Futako Tamagawa: Todoroki Saketen (1989, EX)
- Asu ni Mukatte Hashire! (1989, CX) – as Umitaro Tsushima
- Top Stewardess Monogatari (1990, TBS) – as Ando
- Lullaby Keiji (1991, 1992, EX) – as Tsutomu Honda
- Yonimo Kimyōna Monogatari "Ningen Kokuhō" (1992, CX) – Kengo Fujii
- Doyō Drama Tōsenbo Tōri (1992, NHK)
- Hanshi Chitori Monochō (1993, NTV) – as Kojuro Shimura
- Watashi ga Aishita Ultra Seven (1993, NHK) – as Dan (Kohji Moritsugu)
- Zenigata Heiji 3rd Series Episode 1 "Kurayami no Konrei" (1993, CX)
- Shōnigekabyōtō Ashita mata ne! (1993, TBS)
- Piano (1994, NHK) – as Keita Fujiyoshi
- Itsunohika sono Mune ni (1994, TBS) – as Tsuyoshi Kamiya
- Saturday Night at the Mysteries (EX)
  - Tokkyū yufuin no Mori Satsujin Jiken (1995)
  - Shūchakueki Series (1996–98)
  - Onsenwaka Okami no Satsujin Suiri (2000)"
  - Hensōfukei no Jikenbo (2000–02) – as Noriyuki Mori
- Second Chance (1995, TBS) – as Toru Yamanaka
- Drama Shinginga (NHK)
  - Uogashi no Princess (1995) – as Jiyunpei Nishio
  - Kekkon wa ikaga? (1996)
  - Shokon Saikon (1997) – as Fumito Yasuhara
- Banchamo Debana (1997, TBS) – as Taichi Nakahara
- Ai no Gekijō Saikon Trump (1998, TBS) – as Yuji
- Aoitori Syndrome (1999, EX) – as Akihisa Isomura
- Kayō Suspense Gekijō (NTV)
  - Shōkyōto Mystery 25 (1999) – as Toshio Sonoyama
  - Shinpen Keigo 6 (2000) – as Yoshitaka Nogami
- Yasuo Uchida Suspense Shinano no Colombo Jiken File Series (2001–, TX) – as Kazuo Okabe
- Abarenbō Shōgun XI Series: Haru no Special (2001–04, EX) – as Goro Sake of the Edo-cho firefighting group
- Okamisan Dosukoi!! (2002, TBS) – as Mitsuo Saeki
- Shūgorō Yamamoto 100th Anniversary Programme Hatsutsubomi (2003, TBS) – as Kyuuma Morita
- Kenkyaku Shōbai 5th Series Episode 1 "Kinō no Teki" (2004, CX/Shochiku) – as Momotaro Sekiyama
- Kinyō Entertainment Jitsuroku Rikon Hisshō Drama Rikon Counselor Shoko Todoroki (1) (2004, CX) – as Shuzo Yamazaki
- Kikasete yo Ai no Kotoba o (2005, TBS) – as Katsuya Goto
- Fugo Keiji Episode 9 (2005, EX) – as Yuji Kumagai
- Mito Kōmon (TBS)
  - Part 35 (2005) as Takamatsu Domain, Sanuki Province Lord Matsudaira Yoritsune
  - Part 43 Episode 4 "Suke ga Deatta Onna Yūrei -Manazuru-" (2011) – as Shinzaburo Mine
- Keishichō Tokushu Butai 512 (2005, NTV) – Shunsaku Koda
- Shin Hosou de Hanjōki (2006, CX) – as Seiji Ibuki
- Akihabara@Deep Search (Episode) 9. (2006, TBS) – as Domon (Fukushū-ya)
- Suiyō Mystery 9 Oitsumeru (2006, TX)
- Ojīsan-sensei (2007, NTV) – as Seiji Oinuma
- Boys Esté Episode9-11 (2007, TX) – as Toru Kasugai
- Kyotaro Nishimura Suspense Tetsudō Sōsa-kan 8 (2007, EX) – as Isao Iguchi
- Utahime Episodes 8–10 (2007, TBS) – as Hisamatsu
- Shikaku Ukeoinin 2nd Series Episode 4 SP (2008, TX)
- Hissatsu Shigoto Hito 2009 Episode 12 (2009, ABC-EX) – as Seihyoe Osada
- Drama Tokubetsu Kikaku Izakaya mo heji (25 Sep 2011, TBS) – as Mishin-ya man
- Drama Tokubetsu Kikaku Kaneko Misuzu Monogatari –Minna Chigatte Minna ī– (9 Jul 2012, TBS) – as Inehiko Kirihara
- Drama Special SP—Keishichō Keigo-ka 4 (4 May 2014, EX) – as Shinsuke Yanagida
- Maruho no Onna –Hoken Hanzai Chōsa-in– Episode 4 (2014, TX) – as Takao Fukami
- Kyotaro Nishimura Travel Mystery (EX-Toei ver.)
  - 62nd Work: Shindai Tokkyū Cassiopeia & Super Hi-tachi Renzoku Satsujin (Remake ver. of series's 13th work Nihonkai Satsujin Route) (12 Jul 2014, EX) – as Isao Yamamoto
- Taiko Mochi no Tatsujin –Tadashī ×× no Home-kata– Episode 1 (2015, TX) – as Jin Tsurui
- Getsuyō Golden (TBS)
  - Tax Inspector Madogiwa Taro: Case File 28 (2015) – as Shogo Himekawa
- Garo: Gold Storm Sho Episode 11 (2015, TX) – as Moyuru
- Seicho Matsumoto Mystery Jidaigeki Episode 10 "Ame to Kawanone" (11 Aug 2015, BS Japan) – as Ichisuke
- Getsuyō Meisaku Gekijō (TBS)
  - Detective Tokunosuke Jinbo 11 (30 Jan 2017) – as Shigenori Mizushima
- Extremely Inappropriate! (2024, TBS) – as himself
- Soda Master (2026, Fuji TV) – as Kento Yoshii

=== Other TV appearances ===
- Nekketsu! Hōshasen Charisma-sensei (2007, Nittele Plus & Science (now Nittele Plus)) – as Professor Goro Hojohara
- Mitchaku 118-nichi! Sentōki Pilot e no Michi Wing Mark ni Kakeru Otoko-tachi no Tatakai (2008, TX) – Narration
- Keizai Documentary Drama Rubicon no Ketsudan (2009–10, TX)
  - Aoiro Hakkō Diode o Tsukutta Otoko Shuji Nakamura – as Shuji Nakamura
  - Nippon no Dai Ketsudan 2009 Seiken Kōtai – as Seiji Maehara
  - Ryōma no Kōkei-sha Iwasaki Yatarō –Nippon Keizai no Ishizue o Kizuita Otoko– – as Sakamoto Ryōma
  - Kaden Sensō! Odoroki no Takane Uri Gyōten Service de Ryōhan-ten ni Idonda Denki-ten
- Africa Tairiku 3,700 km Bakusō! Ponkotsu Ramen Yatai 2 (15 Sep 2014, TX)

=== Films ===
- Love on a Daily Basis (1988,) – as Saburo Nagareyama
- Lonely Hitman (1989) – as Shuhei Kawai
- Boku no Sentaku (2000) – as Hiroshi Nojima
- Ryōzanpaku Family (2003) – as Tetsuji Shimada
- Friends (2004) – as Kanie
- Peanuts (2006) – as Takeshi Shibuya
- Master of Thunder: Kessen!! Sekiro Ryūkaden (2006) – as Takamura Ono
- Saraba Kamen Rider Den-O: Final Countdown (2008,) – as Shiro / Kamen Rider Yuuki Hijack Form (voice)
- Liar Game: The Final Stage (2010) – as Mamoru Igarashi

=== Stage ===
- Genroku Hana no Koi Samurai (1993 Mitotic nationwide longitudinal performance)
- Super Musical: The Tale of Genji (1996 39 nationwide performances nationwide)
- Gakugeki Ricolis (1997 Lilia Hall)
- Te no Naka no Ringo (1998 Osaka Ogimachi Museum Square-Shinjuku Theater Tops)
- Hana no Jō (1998 Meiji-za November performance)
- South Pacific (1999 Aoyama Theater)
- Ue o Muite Arukō (1999 Shinbashi Enbujō)
- Tsuma-tachi no Rokumeikan (2000 Meiji-za February performance, 2002 Meiji-za)
- Miyamoto Musashi (2000 Nationwide)
- Aoki-san-ka no Okusan (2000 Mitaka City Arts and Culture Center, 2008 Kanto Gakuin University Bennett Hall)
- Dōtonbori Monogatari (2000 Osaka Shochiku-za—Shinbashi Enbujō, 2003 Hakata-za)
- Sora no Kaasama (2001 Geijutsu-za)
- Yukiguni (2003 Meitetsu Hall)
- Furuamerika ni Sode wa nurasaji (2003 Osaka Shochiku-za—Shinbashi Enbujō)
- Kigeki Oedodegozaru–Nihonbashi Nagasakiya Oranda Yashiki (2004 Shinbashi Enbujō)
- Niji no Hashi (2004 Misono-za)
- Ajisai (2005 Theatre1010)
- Ibrahim Ojisan to Quran no Hana-tachi (2005 Hakuhinkan)
- Ikuyo Nakamichi no Gomen! Asobase Classic (2005 Nationwide)
- Furidashita Yuki (2006 Theatre1010)
- Kazunomiya Samaotome (2006 Shinbashi Enbujō)
- Edo Miyage Korikori-banashi (2006 Theatre1010, 2008 Mitsukoshi Theater, 2010 Nationwide)
- Onna-tachi no Chūshingura (2006 Meiji-za)
- Akane Sora (2007 Chunichi Theatre)
- Chūshingura: Inochi Moyurutoki (2007 Meiji-za)
- The Samurai I Loved (2007 Osaka Shochiku-za)
- Edo no Budōkai (2008 Meiji-za February performance)
- God Doctor (2008 New National Theatre Tokyo) – as Honnō no Eda-san
- Ōkawa watari (2008 Meiji-za, 2009 Chunichi Theatre)
- Hanabanashiki Ichizoku (2008 Le Theatre Ginza and elsewhere, 2010 The Galaxy Theatre and elsewhere) – as Saburo Sugishi
- Cast 3-Ri ni yoru Gekiteki Rōdoku Geki Kujō no Tegami (2009 Hakuhinkan Theater)
- Miyuki Kawanaka Performance (Misono-za)
  - Miyuki Kawanaka Special Performance: Otose–Ryūma ga Shitau Hotarubi no Onna (2009) – as Sakamoto Ryōma
  - Miyuki Kawanaka Performance: Taka Jo Ranman (2011) – as Shuzen Nagano
- Onna no Ie (2009 Shinbashi Enbujō)
- Kōge (2010 Mitsukoshi Theater and elsewhere) – as Fumitake Ezaki, later Hachiro Kuwata
  - Because his co-star Bsaku Sato was sick due to poor physical conditions, he acted as a substitute from the middle of the performance.
- Onna no Hitosashiyubi (2011 Mitsukoshi Theater) – as Origuchi
- Onna-tachi no Chūshingura (2012 Meiji-za)
- Macbeth (2012 Laforet Museum Harajuku)
- Taichi Saotome Performance: Shinshū Tenbakyō (2013 Meiji-za, Chunichi Theatre)
- 40 Carat (2013 Tokyo Art Theater Playhouse, Osaka Shochiku-za)
- Saimatsu Meiji-za: Le Fair Nenmatsuda yo! Minna Shūgō!! (21–24 Dec 2013 Meiji-za) – as Kichiji Kaneuri
- Yuku Toshi Kuru-nen Fuyu no Jin Shiwasu Meiji-za Jidaigeki-sai (Dec 2017 Meiji-za/Jan 2018 Umeda Arts Theater) – as Uesugi Kagekatsu
- Moulin Rouge! (Summer 2023-Summer 2024) – as Harold Zidler
- Sister Act (Spring 2026) – as Curtis Jackson

=== Talk-Variety ===
- Quiz! Nou Bell Show (30 Mar 2016, 5 Feb 2018, BS Fuji)
- BS Fuji: 11-Jikan TV: Zenkoku taikō! Nō Tore-sei Gassen!! (11 Nov 2017, BS Fuji)

== Discography ==
=== Singles-Records ===
- Sexy No.1/Rainy (1 Jun 1981)
- Lonely Day/Odore! Koibito (1981)
- Yoko o Mukuna, tamerau na/Yūwaku Hoshi (1982)
- Natsu no Knife/Kaeri na (22 May 1985)
- Only You/Samayō Sedai (Stray Age) (21 Sep 1985)
- Ki ni naru Hey Girl/Gatakeshi Monora (21 Mar 1986)
- Night Game/Kimi to no Hibi (21 Sep 1986)
- Dance & Dance/Tokyo Night (22 Jul 1987)

=== Albums ===
- Turn Loose (1 Jul 1985)
- Stray Age (1 Nov 1985)*Not on CD
- Success (11 Mar 1986)
- Champ (22 Jul 1987)
- Best Of Yuki Matsumura (1 Jul 1988)
- Golden J-Pop The Best (22 Sep 1999)
- Golden Best (23 Jan 2008)
- Takeo Tsutō (6 Nov 2013)

=== Videos and LD ===
- Yu-ki Matsumura "Success: Yu-ki Matsumura First Tribe" (21 Jul 1986)

=== DVD ===
- Yu-ki Matsumura Christmas Dinner Show (2006–10)
- Yu-ki Matsumura Christmas Dinner Live (2011–13)

== As a subject ==
- Kamui Kengishu Produced performance Shion (2001)
- Shin Hosou de Hanjōki (2007, CX-Toho)
- Ellie Omiya "Ikiru Conte" publication commemoration autograph session (2008)
- Miyuki Kawanaka Gujō Yume Uta (2009, Teichiku Entertainment)

== See also ==
- List of Japanese actors
- Daiei TV-Film
  - Shingo Tsurumi
  - Kazue Itoh
  - Chiemi Hori
- Atsushi Oyagi
