= Silver spoon (disambiguation) =

Silver spoon is an idiomatic expression in English synonymous with wealth, especially inherited wealth.

Silver Spoon may also refer to:

== Arts and entertainment ==
- "Silver Spoon", a song by Jefferson Airplane members Paul Kantner and Grace Slick, from their album Sunfighter
- Silver Spoon (manga), a manga series by Hiromu Arakawa adapted into an anime series and live-action film
- Gin no Spoon, a manga series by Mari Ozawa adapted into a live-action television series
- The Silver Spoon, a 1933 British comedy crime film
- "Silver Spoon", a song by Lily Allen from Sheezus
- "Silver Spoon", a song by Todrick Hall from Forbidden
- Silver Spoon DDT, a rope-hung DDT used by WWE superstar Randy Orton as trademark move

=== Literature ===
- The Silver Spoon (1926), a novel by John Galsworthy in the A Modern Comedy trilogy
- The Silver Spoon, English translation of the Italian cookbook Il cucchiaio d'argento (1950) published by the magazine Domus

=== Television ===
- Silver Spoon (Russian TV series), a Russian crime drama
- Silver Spoons, a 1980s American sitcom
- "The Silver Spoon", an episode of BBC 1967 series The Forsyte Saga

== Other uses ==
- Silver Spoon (sugar), a brand of sugar owned by British Sugar
- Silver Spoon (horse), an American Hall of Fame racehorse

== See also ==
- Silver Spoon Set (1960), an Italian film directed by Francesco Maselli
- Dessert spoon, silver in color
- Silver fork novel, a 19th-century genre
