= Tsunematsu =

Tsunematsu (written 恒松) is a Japanese surname. Notable people with the surname include:

- Ayumi Tsunematsu (恒松 あゆみ, born 1981), Japanese voice actress
- Tomonori Tsunematsu (恒松 伴典, born 1976), Japanese footballer
- Yuri Tsunematsu (恒松 祐里, born 1998), Japanese actress
