= Ecchi =

Japanese term for playful sexual actions

Clothing which is short or transparent is a typical element in works considered in the West as ecchi.

Ecchi (エッチ, etchi; pronounced [et.tɕi]) is a slang term in the Japanese language for playfully sexual actions. As an adjective, it is used with the meaning of "sexy", "dirty" or "naughty"; as a verb, ecchi suru (エッチする or Ｈする) means "to have sex", and as a noun, it is used to describe someone of lascivious behavior. It is softer than the Japanese word ero (エロ from "Eros" or "erotic"), and does not imply perversion in the way hentai does.

The word ecchi has been adopted by western fans of Japanese media to describe works with sexual overtones. In western culture, it has come to be used to refer to softcore or playful sexuality, as distinct from the word hentai, which connotes perversion or fetishism. Works described as ecchi by the western fans do not show sexual intercourse or genitalia, but sexual themes are referenced. Ecchi themes are a type of fan service, and can be found in most comedy shōnen and seinen manga and harem works.

== Etymology and use in Japan ==
The correct transcription of the word エッチ in Hepburn notation is "etchi". However, it is typically written as "ecchi" in the Western world.

Etchi in and of itself is merely an abbreviation of hentai. There is no distinction between "hardcore" hentai and "softcore" etchi in proper Japanese. See Hentai#Etymology for further etymology.

Hentai was introduced in the Meiji period as a term for change of form or transformation in science and psychology. In this context, it was used to refer to disorders such as hysteria or to describe paranormal phenomena like hypnosis or telepathy. Slowly, the meaning expanded until it had the meaning of non-standard. In the 1910s, it was used in sexology in the compound expression "hentai seiyoku" (変態性欲, abnormal sexual desire, which is rephrased as "sexual perversion" in modern times) and became popular within the theory of sexual deviance (Hentai seiyoku ron), published by Eiji Habuto and Jun'ichirō Sawada in 1915. In the 1920s, many publications dealt with deviant sexual desires and the ero guro nansensu movement. Goichi Matsuzawa calls it a period characterized by a "hentai boom". In the 1930s, censorship became more common, leading to fewer books being published on this theme.

After the Second World War, in the 1950s, interest in hentai was renewed, and people would sometimes refer to it just by the first English letter, H (pronounced as エッチ, [eꜜttɕi]). In 1952, the magazine Shukan Asahi reported that a woman who was groped by a stranger in a movie theater reacted with "ara etchi yo" ("hey, that's perverse"). In this context, etchi should be understood as sexually forward and is synonymous to iyarashii (嫌らしい, dirty or disgusting) or sukebe (すけべ, a person with sex on the brain). From this, the word etchi started to branch off, and assume new connotations. In the 1960s, etchi started to be used by youth to refer to sex in general. By the 1980s, it was used to mean sex, as in the phrase etchi suru (to have sex).

Other neologisms such as sekkusu are often used to refer to sex, in addition to the term ecchi. Ecchi is now used as a qualifier for anything related to erotic or pornographic content. Its exact meaning varies with context, but in general, it is most similar to the English word "naughty" (when used as an adjective). The Japanese media tend to use other words, e.g. ero-manga (エロ), adult manga (アダルト), or anime / manga for persons over 18 years (18禁アニメ, 18禁). The prefix "H-" is also sometimes used to refer to pornographic genres, e.g. H-anime, H-manga, etc.

== Western usage ==
In Japan, oiroke manga (お色気漫画) is used to describe manga with very light or playful erotic content, such as is found in shonen manga. In western nations, though, ecchi has become the preferred term. The more explicit seijin manga (成人向け漫画, seijinmukemanga) are more likely to be referred to as hentai in the west. This does correlate to a similar distinction in Japanese. For instance, if a young woman were to call a young man etchi, that might be construed as flirting, whereas hentai sounds more like condemnation.

Works aimed at a female audience can contain scenes which are seen as ecchi. Examples are R-18 Love Report! from Emiko Sugi and Oruchuban Ebichu from Risa Itō, which are aimed at the shōjo and josei audience, but contain rather explicit content.

Common elements of ecchi include conversations with sexual references or misunderstandings (e.g. double entendre or innuendo), misunderstandings in visual depictions (e.g. suggestive posing), revealing or sexualized clothing (e.g. underwear or cosplay), nudity (e.g. ripped apart clothing, wet clothing, clothing malfunctions) and the portrayal of certain actions (e.g. groping). This kind of sexuality is often used for comical effect. A typical example scene would contain a male protagonist that trips over a female character, giving the impression of sexual harassment.

The concept of ecchi is very closely related to fan service. While fan service describes every aspect to please the fans, ecchi relates to sexual themes. A special kind of fan service, that is usually bound or justified by the narrative.

=== Typical examples ===
There are many elements that may classify a work as ecchi, but these elements have to occur quite often (for example, in all episodes of a show). Graphically speaking, different techniques are used to show sexy pictures, usually by revealing parts of the female body such as the back or breasts. Some of these patterns are recurrent, such as scenes in a shower, hot springs (onsen), or fighting scenes in which clothes are torn apart. The imagination of characters is also a common device for showing their sexual fantasies, as well as transformation scenes of magical girls. In the end, any excuse is valid to show a character partially or completely nude.

==== Nudity ====
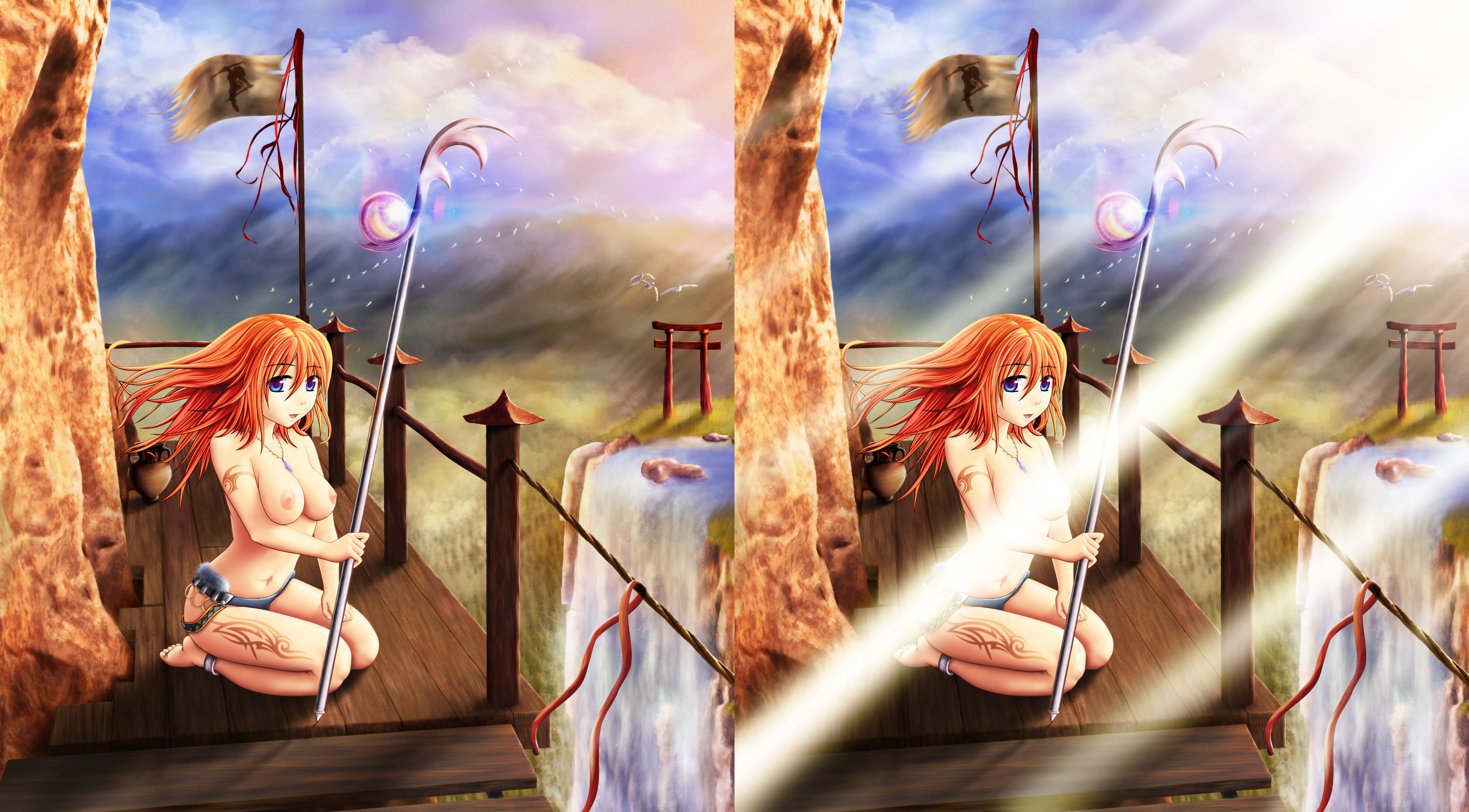
Censorship with artificial light rays is one common method to hide some elements in anime television series. The degree of censorship can vary widely across television stations, even among those broadcasting the series at the same time.

Levels of nudity vary strongly between works, depending on the intended audience and the preferences of the authors. For example, in some cases, though the breasts are shown on the screen, nipples and genitals are obscured by props, clothing, or effects. This kind of censorship was typical for Lala Satalin Deviluke in To Love Ru, Blair in Soul Eater and Asuka Langley Soryu from Neon Genesis Evangelion. Conversely, in Ladies versus Butlers! and other such anime, the nipples are clearly visible through clothing, no matter how thick it is. In any case nosebleeds as a comedic trope are a typical masculine reaction to female nudity or semi-nudity inasmuch as they represent one extremely exaggerated component of sexual arousal – increased blood pressure.

==== Panties ====
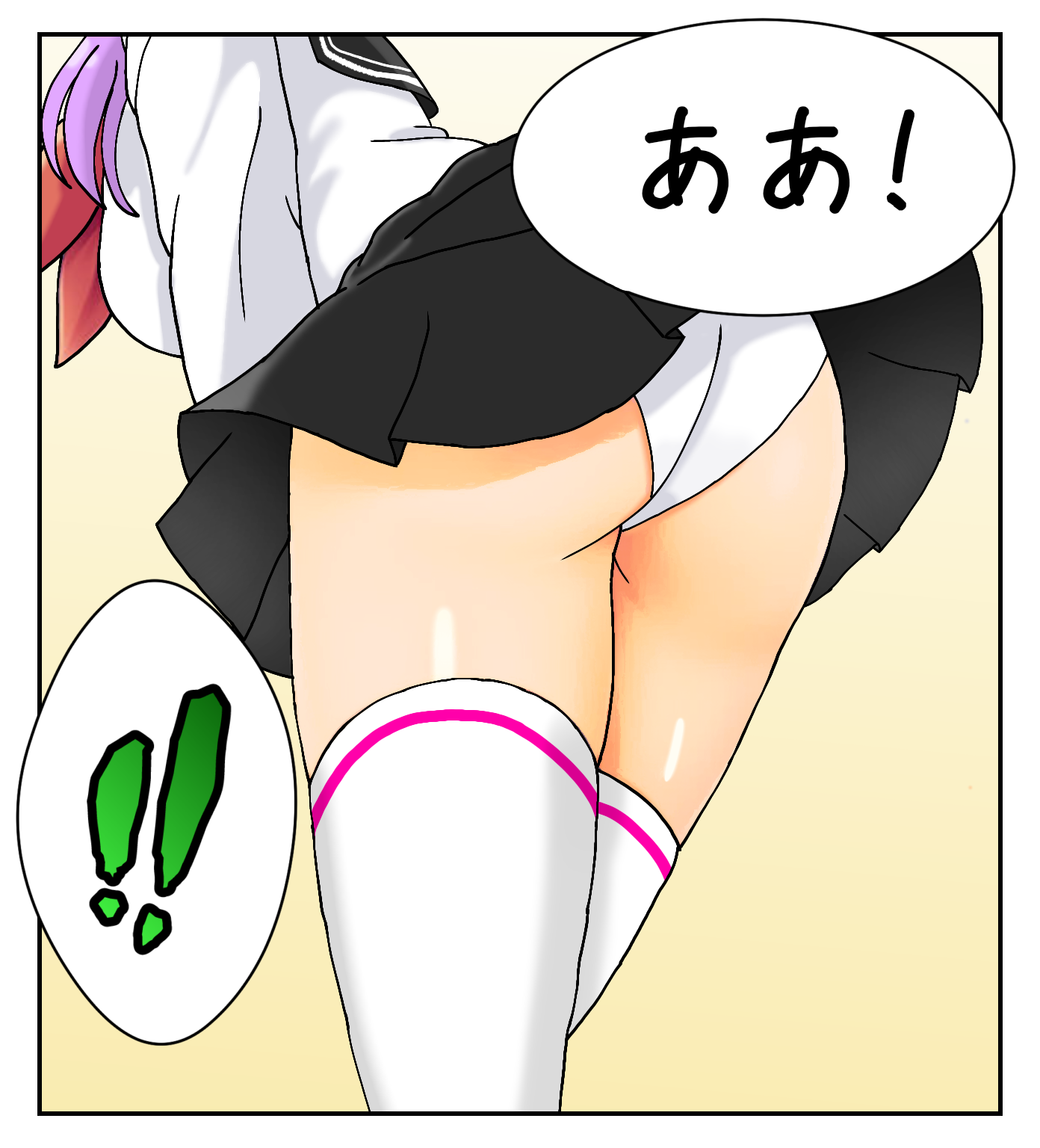
Example of a panty shot.

The use of panty shots (panchira), or visibility of the underwear (panties), is one common motif. Typically the male character will react in an exaggerated manner and be castigated. Furthermore the color and style of the panties are an indication of the character, personality, and range sexual experience (or lack of it) of the female character, e.g. white for the innocent, striped for the shy, and red for the experienced. Panties are the main theme in some ecchi (for instance, Chobits and Panty & Stocking with Garterbelt), but they can also appear in other anime simply for a bit of gratuitous sex appeal.

==== Sexual activity ====
Although revealing or sexualized clothing, nudity or groping may occur in ecchi works, there usually is no explicit sexual intercourse in such works (although in the West they may be erroneously classified as hentai). However, suggestions of sexual activity for comedic effect, such as suggestive sounds or a silhouette visible from outside a tent, are common.

== See also ==
- Adult animation
- Cartoon pornography
- Doujinshi
- Exhibitionism
- Fan service
- Hentai
- Not safe for work
- Nudity in film
- Rule 34
- Scopophilia
- Softcore porn
- Thirst trap
- Voyeurism
