= VCL =

VCL may refer to:

== Computing ==
- Varnish Configuration Language, a domain-specific language used for configuring the Varnish Proxy / Server
- Video Coding Layer, a layer in H.264/AVC and HEVC
- Virus Creation Laboratory, an MS-DOS program designed to create computer viruses
- Visual Component Library, a framework for building user interfaces in Delphi, C++Builder and Python
- Visual Class Library, an internal part of OpenOffice.org and LibreOffice
- Voluntary collective licensing, an alternative approach to solve the problem of software piracy

== Other uses ==
- Vinculin, a mammal protein
- Vickers-Carden-Loyd tankette, a British tankette
- Voluntary Committee of Lawyers, a former organization to repeal prohibition of alcohol in the US
- Vampire Cheerleaders, a manga series
- Chu Lai Airport (IATA code: VCL)
