= Mr. Bride =

Japanese manga series

- Cover of the first volume

わたしのお嫁くん (Watashi no Oyome-kun)
- Genre: Romantic comedy
- Manga
- Written by: Natsumi Shiba
- Published by: Kodansha
- English publisher: NA: Kodansha USA
- Magazine: Kiss
- Original run: February 25, 2019 – August 24, 2023
- Volumes: 10
- Television drama
- Directed by: Kaede Kamiya; Hidenori Joho; Yusuke Mito
- Produced by: Toshiyuki Nakano
- Written by: Natsu Hashimoto
- Music by: Yukari Hashimoto
- Original network: Fuji TV
- Original run: April 12, 2023 – June 21, 2023
- Episodes: 11

Mr. Bride (Japanese: わたしのお嫁くん, Hepburn: Watashi no Oyome-kun) is a Japanese manga series written and illustrated by Natsumi Shiba. It was serialized in Kiss from February 2019 to August 2023, with its individual chapters collected into ten volumes. A television drama adaptation aired from April to June 2023.

== Media ==
=== Manga ===
Written and illustrated by Natsumi Shiba, the series began serialization in Kodansha's Kiss magazine on February 19, 2019. The series completed its serialization on August 24, 2023. Its individual chapters were collected into ten tankōbon volumes.

In May 2023, Kodansha USA announced that they licensed the series for English publication.

==== Volumes ====
No.	Original release date	Original ISBN	English release date	English ISBN
1	July 13, 2020	978-4-06-520269-2	August 31, 2021	978-1-63-699312-6
2	November 13, 2020	978-4-06-521401-5	September 28, 2021	978-1-63-699377-5
3	March 12, 2021	978-4-06-522784-8	October 26, 2021	978-1-63-699428-4
4	July 13, 2021	978-4-06-523874-5	November 16, 2021	978-1-63-699470-3
5	November 12, 2021	978-4-06-525915-3	April 19, 2022	978-1-68-491133-2
6	March 11, 2022	978-4-06-527037-0	September 20, 2022	978-1-68-491448-7
7	July 13, 2022	978-4-06-528288-5	January 17, 2023	978-1-68-491648-1
8	February 13, 2023	978-4-06-529875-6	June 20, 2023	978-1-68-491973-4
9	May 12, 2023	978-4-06-531441-8	October 17, 2023	979-8-88-933193-3
10	January 12, 2024	978-4-06-533226-9	June 18, 2024	979-8-88-933571-9

=== TV drama ===
A live-action television drama adaptation was announced on February 13, 2023. It was directed by Kaede Kamiya, Hidenori Joho, and Yusuke Mito and produced by Toshiyuki Nakano, with scripts by Natsu Hashimoto and music composed by Yukari Hashimoto. It starred Haru and Mahiro Takasugi; it was aired on Fuji TV from April 12 to June 21, 2023, with eleven episodes being aired. Its opening and ending themes, "Butterfly Effect" and "Saraba", were performed by Sekai no Owari.

== Reception ==
A columnist for Comics Worth Reading praised the main characters and their relationship, though they felt it used too many cliches.
