= Yuri Tsunematsu =

Japanese actress (born 1998)

- 恒松祐里
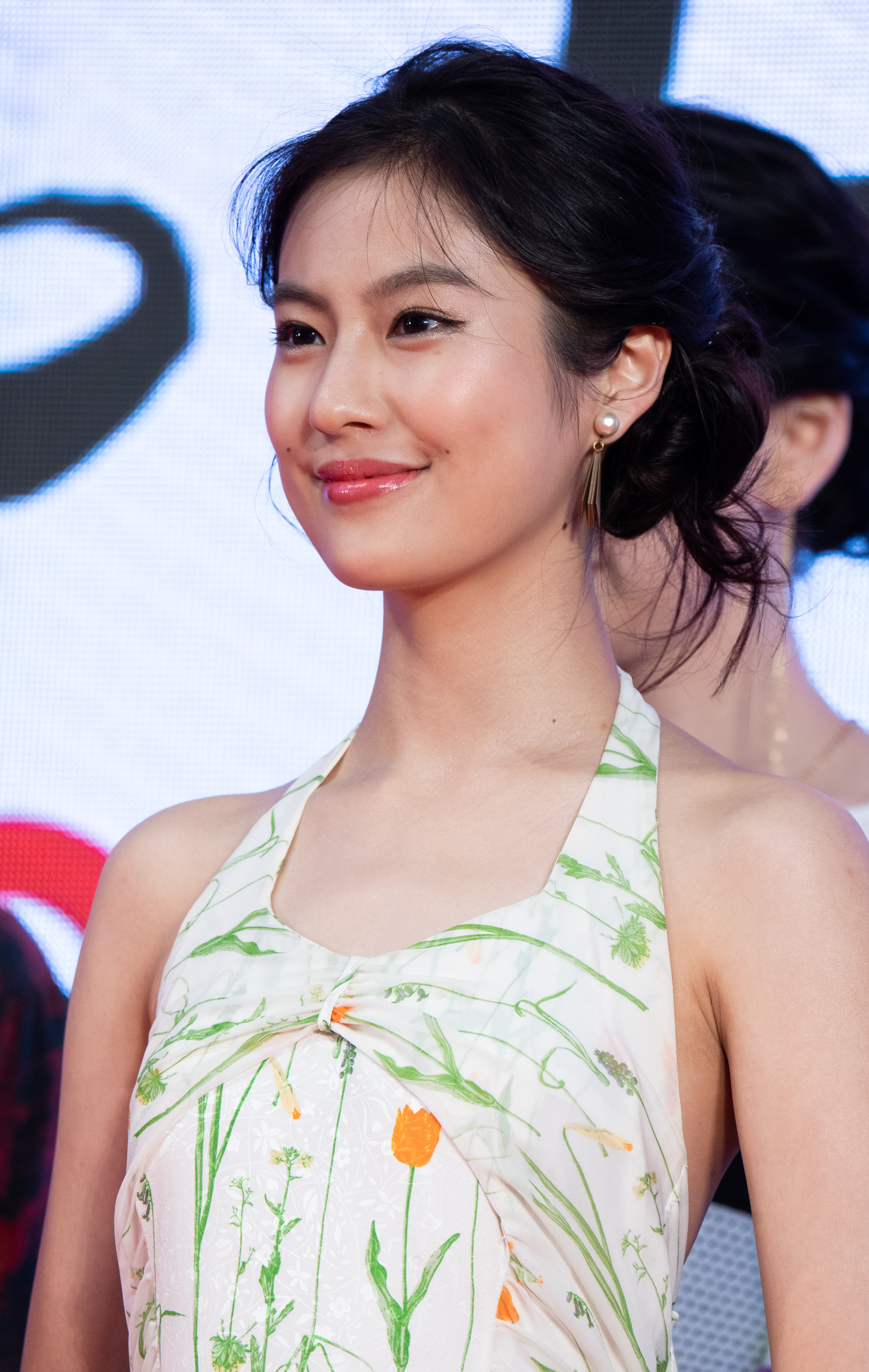
- Tsunematsu at the Tokyo International Film Festival in 2019
- Born: October 9, 1998 (age 27); Tokyo, Japan
- Occupation: Actress
- Years active: 2005–present
- Agent: Amuse Inc.

Yuri Tsunematsu (恒松 祐里(つねまつ ゆり), Tsunematsu Yuri; born October 9, 1998) is a Japanese actress. She made her debut as a child actress in a bit part in the television drama Ruri's Island (2005) and has since appeared in many notable television shows, such as 5→9 From Five to Nine (2015), Sanada Maru (2016), The Naked Director (2021), and Alice in Borderland (2022). She is signed under the talent agency Amuse.

== Career ==
Tsunematsu began her career when she was in kindergarten. Her parents heard about auditions being held for the entertainment agencies, Amuse and Parco and decided to have her tryout and audition. Tsunematsu was able to successfully pass both auditions.

Tsunematsu made her official acting debut as a child in a tidbit part in the 2005 television drama Ruri's Island. She would then go on to make her film debut in Killer Bride's Perfect Crime in 2009.

In 2015, she landed her first role in an Asadora (morning television drama), playing Tomomi Okesaku in Mare. In October that same year, Tsunematsu starred in a supporting role in the drama 5→9 From Five to Nine. While she originally participated in the auditions for the lead role of Junko Sakuraba, the part was ultimately given to Satomi Ishihara. Despite this, Tsunematsu was cast as the main lead's younger sister, Nene Sakuraba, marking her first regular role in a television drama.

In 2016, Tsunematsu appeared in the 37th episode of the Taiga drama Sanada Maru. On June 7, she starred as the lead in the 9th episode of the drama Bishōjo Next Girl meets Tokyo, marking her first lead role in a television drama. In September, Tsunematsu was confirmed to star in the live-action film adaptation of the light novel Sagrada Reset as Eri Oka. The film was released as a two-part series. The first part was released on March 25, 2017, and the second part on May 13, 2017.

In 2017, she starred in her first action film in Before We Vanish as Akira Tachibana. The film was released in Japan on September 9, 2017. In October 2017, she was announced as part of the cast for Saki Achiga-hen: episode of side-A, the second instalment of the live-action drama and film adaptation of the manga Saki. The drama premiered on MBS on December 3, 2017, and the film was released on January 20, 2018.

In February 2020, Tsunematsu starred as the lead in episodes 5 and 6 of the drama 100 Character Ideas Made into a Drama!. That same year, she won the Newcomer Award at the 2020 Osaka Film Festival for her performance in the film Sea of Revival, which was first released on June 28, 2019.

In 2021, Tsunematsu joined the cast of the second season of the Netflix original drama, The Naked Director, taking on the role of the new heroine. That same year, she played the role of Asumi Nomura in the Asadora drama Welcome Home, Monet, marking her second morning drama appearance in six years since Mare in 2015. On July 10, she released her first photo book entitled Monthly Tsunematsu Yuri.

In 2022, Tsunematsu landed her first lead role in the film Kisaragi Station as Haruna Tsutsumi. The film was released on June 3, 2022.

== Filmography ==
=== Film ===
| Year | Title | Role | Notes | Ref. |
|---|---|---|---|---|
| 2009 | Killer Bride's Perfect Crime | | | |
| 2010 | Looking Up at the Half Moon | Miku Natsume (Elementary school days) | | |
| 2011 | OOO, Den-O, All Riders: Let's Go Kamen Riders | Nokko | | |
| 2012 | Rent-a-Cat | Sayoko (Junior high school) | | |
| 2014 | Fuku-chan of FukuFuku Flats | Chiho Sugiura (Junior high school) | | |
| 2015 | Have a Song on Your Lips | Nazuna Nakamura | | |
| 2015 | Chickens Dynamite | Mirai Koyama | | |
| 2015 | My Love Story!! | Chiharu | | |
| 2016 | Chihayafuru Part 1 | Girl 1 (Saki's friend) | | |
| 2016 | Angel of Horror | Azami Minami | | |
| 2017 | Haruta & Chika | Naoko Serizawa | | |
| 2017 | Sagrada Reset: Part 1 | Eri Oka | | |
| 2017 | Sagrada Reset: Part 2 | Eri Oka | | |
| 2017 | Before We Vanish | Akira Tachibana | | |
| 2018 | Saki Achiga-hen: episode of side-A | Kuro Matsumi | | |
| 2018 | Rainbow Days | Mari Tsutsui | | |
| 2018 | Real Girl | Arisa Ishino | | |
| 2019 | Little Nights, Little Love | Mio Oda | | |
| 2019 | Strawberry Song | Kazumi | | |
| 2019 | Sea of Revival | Minami | | |
| 2019 | He Won't Kill, She Won't Die | Sumiko "Jimiko" Miyasada | | |
| 2020 | Signal 100 | Noriko Minowa | | |
| 2020 | A Life Turned Upside Down: My Dad's an Alcoholic | Jun | | |
| 2020 | Wife of a Spy | Komako | | |
| 2022 | Kisaragi Station | Haruna Tsutsumi | Lead role | |
| 2023 | G-Men | Reina | | |
| 2024 | Cottontail | Akiko (young) | British-Japanese film | |
| 2025 | Re: Kisaragi Station | Haruna Tsutsumi | | |
| 2025 | Mission: Sorta Possible | Sakura Katase | | |
| 2025 | Vanishing World | Juri | | |

=== Television series ===
| Year | Title | Role | Notes | Ref. |
|---|---|---|---|---|
| 2005 | Ruri's Island | Izumi (6 years old) | | |
| 2008 | Fukidemono to Imouto | Mami Narita | | |
| 2008 | Future Amusement Park II: The Horse Thief and the Merry-Go-Round | Mayu Miura (young) | Single episode drama | |
| 2009 | The Flying Tire | Mika Katayama | Episodes 1 and 3 | |
| 2010–2011 | Hagane no Onna | Yuri Takada | | |
| 2013 | The Family Game | Sara Mizukami | Episode 9 | |
| 2015 | Mare | Tomomi Okesaku | Asadora | |
| 2015 | Do S Deka | Megumi Kawato | Episode 6 | |
| 2015 | 5→9 From Five to Nine | Nene Sakuraba | | |
| 2015 | Dr. Storks | Rumiko Komatsu (young) | Episode 7 | |
| 2016 | Fragile | Kana Dewa | Episode 8 | |
| 2016 | True Horror Stories: The Inviting Swamp | Hitomi Takamatsu | | |
| 2016 | Sanada Maru | Sue | Taiga drama | |
| 2017 | & Bishoujo: Next Girl Meets Tokyo | Miku Aihara | Lead role; episode 9 | |
| 2017 | Saki Achiga-hen episode of Side-A | Kuro Matsumi | | |
| 2017 | Refrain | Tsumugi Ayaori | | |
| 2018 | The Kitazawas: We Mind Our Own Business | Satoko Ikee | | |
| 2018 | Lock On Love | Kosame Asakura | | |
| 2018 | Tokyo Alien Bros. | Chinami | | |
| 2018 | Asami Mitsuhiko Series: Under the Flowers | Nao Tanno | | |
| 2019 | The School of Water Business | Nozomi Manaka | | |
| 2019 | Asagao: Forensic Doctor | Misaki Kuroiwa | Episode 6 | |
| 2020 | Wasteful Days of High School Girls | Akane "Wota" Kikuchi | | |
| 2020 | 100 Character Ideas Made into a Drama! | Sumire and Yuki Takayama | Episodes 5 and 6 | |
| 2020 | Wife of a Spy | Komako | Television film | |
| 2020 | Mr. Housekeeper, Mitazono | Sakura Hanada | Season 4; episode 3 | |
| 2020 | Suits | Yoriko Ayukawa | Season 2; episode 11 | |
| 2021 | We Are Medical Interns | Kurumi Nakazono | | |
| 2021 | Welcome Home, Monet | Asumi Nomura | Asadora | |
| 2021 | The Naked Director | Mariko Nogi | Season 2 | |
| 2022 | The Travel Nurse | Mami Kosaka | | |
| 2022 | Alice in Borderland | Akane Heiya | Season 2 | |
| 2023 | Reversal Orchestra | Kanna Tanioka | | |
| 2023 | Dr. Chocolate | Anju Momose | Episode 2 | |
| 2023 | Miwa-san Narisumasu | Sakura Miwa | | |
| 2023 | Burn the House Down | Yuzu Murata | | |
| 2024 | Nursing Aide at Your Side | Moe "Nashimoe" Takanashi | Episode 2 | |
| 2024 | The Honest Realtor | Yamamoto Mirei | Season 2 | |
| 2024 | Watashi no Shitai wo Sagashite Kudasai. | Saori Ikegami | | |
| 2024 | My Precious | Makoto Komori | | |
| 2025 | Private Banker | Yukie Kirishima | Episode 2 | |
| 2025 | Inheritance Detective | Mao Fukuda | Episodes 6 and 10 | |
| 2025 | Gannibal | Gin Gotō (young) | Season 2 | |
| 2025 | I Want to Die Alone | Mayu Yamaguchi | | |
| 2025 | The Last Appraiser | Saeko Tobe | Episode 2 | |
| 2025 | A Summer Accomplice | Mio Katagiri | | |
| 2026 | Snow Smoke Chase | Kotone Shirai | | |
| 2026 | Themis's Uncertain Court | Chika Ochiai | | |
| 2026 | Nagatan and Ao: Ichika's Cookbook | Shoko Kawashima | Season 2 | |
| 2026 | Moonlit Journey: The Answer Lies in Masterpieces | Mami | | |
| 2026 | ALIUS: Specific Incident Investigation File | Anna Hanazumi | | |
| 2026 | Junji Ito's Strange Tales That Keep You Up at Night: A Gentle Farewell | Riko | Episode 2 | |
| 2026 | Midnight Taxi | | Episodes 1 and 2 | |

=== Music video appearances ===
| Year | Title | Artist | Ref. |
|---|---|---|---|
| 2013 | "Arigatō" | Funky Monkey Babys | |
| 2015 | "Ashita wa Kitto Ii Hi ni Naru" | Yu Takahashi | |
| 2016 | "Overflows: Kotoba ni dekinakute" | Naoto Inti Raymi | |

=== Video games ===
| Year | Title | Role | Notes | Ref. |
|---|---|---|---|---|
| 2020 | Goonya Fighter | Pai Chan | | |

== Stage ==
=== Theatre ===
| Year | Title | | Role | Venue | Date | Ref. |
| Year | English | Japanese | Role | Venue | Date | Ref. |
|---|---|---|---|---|---|---|
| 2019 | Don Juan | ドン・ジュアン | Elvira | TBS Akasaka ACT Theater | August 30 – September 18 | |
| 2019 | Don Juan | ドン・ジュアン | Elvira | Kariya Cultural Center Iris | October 1–5 | |
| 2022 | The Welkin | ザ・ウェルキン | | Theatre Cocoon, Tokyo | July 7–31 | |
| 2022 | The Welkin | ザ・ウェルキン | | Morinomiya Piloti Hall, Osaka | August 3–7 | |
| 2023 | Parasite | パラサイト | Mayuko Nagai | THEATER MILANO-Za | June 5 – July 2 | |
| 2023 | Parasite | パラサイト | Mayuko Nagai | Shin Kabuki-za Theatre, Osaka | July 7–17 | |
| 2024 | Hazakaiki | ハザカイキ | Kaori Hashimoto | THEATER MILANO-Za | March 31 – April 22 | |
| 2024 | Hazakaiki | ハザカイキ | Kaori Hashimoto | Morinomiya Piloti Hall, Osaka | April 27 – May 6 | |

== Awards and nominations ==
| Year | Award ceremony | Category | Nominated work(s) | Result | Ref. |
|---|---|---|---|---|---|
| 2020 | Osaka Film Festival | Best New Actress | Sea of Revival | Won | |
