= Mari Ozawa =

Japanese manga artist

Mari Ozawa 小沢真理
- Area: Manga artist
- Notable works: Sekai de Ichiban Yasashii Ongaku
- Awards: 19th Kodansha Manga Award for shōjo - Sekai de Ichiban Yasashii Ongaku

Mari Ozawa (小沢真理, Ozawa Mari) is a Japanese josei manga artist from Sapporo, Hokkaido, who writes primarily for Kiss and Young You. She won the 1995 Kodansha Manga Award for shōjo for Sekai de Ichiban Yasashii Ongaku.

== Notable works ==
- Sekai de Ichiban Yasashii Ongaku (1993-1999)
- Nikoniko Nikki (2000-2003)
- Pong Pong (2006-2008)
- Gin no Spoon (2010-2017)
