= Makeup Is Not (Just) Magic =

Japanese manga essay series

- Makeup Is Not (Just) Magic: A Manga Guide to Cosmetics and Skin Care
- Cover of the Japanese version of vol. 1 of Beginners, first published on March 13, 2019

メイクはただの魔法じゃないの (Meiku wa Tada no Mahō Janai no)
- Genre: Essay, non-fiction
- Manga
- Written by: Ikumi Rotta
- Published by: Kodansha
- English publisher: NA: Seven Seas Entertainment
- Imprint: KC Kiss; KC Peace
- Magazine: Palcy (Beginners); Kiss (Technique)
- Original run: January 25, 2018 – present
- Volumes: 4

Makeup Is Not (Just) Magic: A Manga Guide to Cosmetics and Skin Care (Japanese: メイクはただの魔法じゃないの, Hepburn: Meiku wa Tada no Mahō Janai no) is a Japanese manga essay series written and illustrated by Ikumi Rotta. The manga serves as a guide, providing advice on how to apply makeup and proper skin care, based on Rotta's experiences in working as a beauty consultant.

The manga has two series: Beginners (ビギナーズ, Bigināzu), which acts as an introduction to makeup and skincare; and Technique (テクニック, Tekunikku), which focuses on makeup techniques. Both manga series are published simultaneously, with Beginners serialized digitally on the manga mobile app Palcy and Technique serialized in the monthly josei manga magazine Kiss, since January 25, 2018.

== Synopsis ==
Makeup Is Not (Just) Magic is a manga guide written and illustrated by Ikumi Rotta, who had formerly worked as a department store beauty consultant. The Beginners series teaches the fundamentals of makeup and skincare, such as how to apply foundation and eyeliner, as well as how to properly wash one's face. The Technique series is a "discussion" on how to apply makeup.

== Production ==
Rotta drew artistic inspiration from Moyoco Anno and Ai Yazawa's works, stating in an interview with Voce that she enjoyed scenes where the characters put on makeup. When Rotta debuted as a manga artist, she was forced to take a second job to make a living and was considering changing careers. She applied to become a beauty consultant at a department store after finding a job offer in a magazine but instead was hired by the department store to work in the shoe department, where she gained customer service skills. Eventually, she was transferred to work as a beauty consultant, where she noticed that some customers felt intimidated with direct advice. Rotta illustrated visual guides and techniques to "communicate" her knowledge through manga.

While drawing manga, Rotta states that she uses her makeup tools to recreate the process. She stated that because her manga is in black and white, she put effort into the "texture" and "atmosphere" of the makeup, as well as putting sound effects for her readers to visualize. In addition, she stated that feedback from her readers who were inexperienced in makeup showed that they preferred the manga format to avoid comparing themselves to real-life models.

== Media ==
=== Manga ===
Makeup Is Not (Just) Magic, published as the Technique series, began serialization in the monthly josei manga magazine Kiss in the March 2018 issue released on January 25, 2018. The Beginners series was simultaneously serialized digitally in the manga mobile app Palcy in 2018. The chapters were later released as four bound volumes by Kodansha, with the first volume of Beginners under the KC Kiss imprint and the rest of the volumes under the KC Peace imprint. In 2020, Rotta collaborated with makeup artist Shinobu Igari, creating a manga version of her editorial column, which was exclusively published in the magazine Voce.

On October 23, 2019, Seven Seas Entertainment announced that they had licensed the first volume of Beginners for North American distribution in English.

==== Beginners ====
No.	Original release date	Original ISBN	English release date	English ISBN
1	March 13, 2019	9784065148129	May 26, 2020 (digital); September 1, 2020 (print)	9781645054467
2	July 13, 2022	9784065271162	—	—

==== Technique ====
No.	Japanese release date	Japanese ISBN
1	February 13, 2020	9784065183694
2	July 13, 2022	9784065271155

== Reception ==
Makeup Is Not (Just) Magic: A Manga Guide to Cosmetics and Skin Care received favorable reviews for its comprehensive and easy-to-understand advice. Screen Rant praised Beginners for being accessible for people who were not comfortable with directly asking for advice, such as LGBTQ people. Junko Kuroda reviewed Technique favorably, stating that the manga series gave helpful makeup application advice and highlighting that the manga also gives product recommendations that Rotta has personally tested.
