= Ponytail wa Furimukanai =

- Genre: Drama
- Starring: Kazue Itō; Yūki Matsumura; Shingo Tsurumi; Shinobu Sakagami; Shū Miyata
- Country of origin: Japan
- Original language: Japanese
- No. of episodes: 24

Original release
- Network: TBS
- Release: October 12, 1985 – March 29, 1986

Ponytail wa Furimukanai (ポニーテールはふり向かない, Ponītēru wa Furimukanai) is a Japanese television drama series that aired on TBS in 1985. It is based on a novel by Takashi Kitajima.

== Cast ==
- Kazue Itō
- Yu-ki Matsumura
- Tappie Shimokawa
- Shingo Tsurumi
- Shinobu Sakagami
- Shū Miyata
