= Kujaku no Dance, Dare ga Mita? =

Japanese manga series by Rito Asami

- First tankōbon volume cover

クジャクのダンス、誰が見た？ (Kujaku no Dansu, Dare ga Mita?)
- Genre: Crime, suspense
- Manga
- Written by: Rito Asami
- Published by: Kodansha
- Imprint: KC Kiss
- Magazine: Kiss
- Original run: July 25, 2022 – February 25, 2025
- Volumes: 7
- Television drama
- Directed by: Takayoshi Tanazawa; Takahiro Aoyama; Ryosuke Fukuda; Kenta Tanaka
- Produced by: Keisuke Nakajima; Yuki Uchikawa; Izumi Maruyama
- Written by: Tomoki Kanazawa
- Music by: Alisa Okehazama
- Studio: TBS Sparkle; TBS
- Original network: JNN (TBS)
- Original run: January 24, 2025 – March 28, 2025
- Episodes: 10

Kujaku no Dance, Dare ga Mita? (Japanese: クジャクのダンス、誰が見た？, Hepburn: Kujaku no Dansu, Dare ga Mita?; lit. 'Who Saw the Peacock Dance in the Jungle?') is a Japanese manga series written and illustrated by Rito Asami. It was serialized in Kodansha's josei manga magazine Kiss from July 2022 to February 2025. A live-action television drama adaptation began airing from January 2025.

== Plot ==
On Christmas Eve, a former police officer and single father to a daughter was murdered. The suspect was arrested, and the case seemed to be over. However, the case begins to move again with a letter left by the deceased former police officer to his daughter. In it, he wrote, "If the people listed below are arrested and indicted... they are falsely accused." That list included the name of the person arrested for killing her father. The daughter, believing her father's letter, decides to unveil the mystery behind her father's death, despite the possibility that the dark secret her loving father hides from her might come to light.

== Media ==
=== Manga ===
Written and illustrated by Rito Asami, Kujaku no Dance, Dare ga Mita? was serialized in Kodansha's josei manga magazine Kiss from July 25, 2022, to February 25, 2025. The series' chapters were collected into seven tankōbon volumes released from November 11, 2022, to March 13, 2025.

No.	Release date	ISBN
1	November 11, 2022	978-4-06-529545-8
2	April 13, 2023	978-4-06-531248-3
3	August 10, 2023	978-4-06-532465-3
4	December 13, 2023	978-4-06-533540-6
5	April 12, 2024	978-4-06-534940-3
6	November 13, 2024	978-4-06-537209-8
7	March 13, 2025	978-4-06-538981-2

=== Drama ===
A live-action television drama adaptation was announced on November 4, 2024. The drama features Kenichi Matsuyama and Suzu Hirose in lead roles and premiered on TBS and its affiliates on January 24, 2025. The theme song for the series is "Elf" by Ado.

== Reception ==
The series was ranked third for the second Crea Nighttime Manga Award in 2023. It was also ranked fourth in the 2024 edition of Takarajimasha's Kono Manga ga Sugoi! guidebook for the best manga for female readers.
