= Kiss (Japanese magazine) =

Japanese manga magazine

- February 2018 issue cover, featuring the leads from Perfect World
- Categories: Josei manga
- Frequency: Monthly
- Circulation: 21,000; (July–September 2026)
- Founded: March 1992
- Company: Kodansha
- Country: Japan
- Based in: Tokyo
- Language: Japanese
- Website: kisscomic.com

Kiss is a monthly Japanese josei manga magazine published by Kodansha, with a circulation reported at 81,870 in 2015. The magazine is headquartered in Tokyo.

== History and profile ==
Kiss was first published in March 1992 as a supplementary monthly magazine to the shōjo manga magazine Mimi. When Mimi was discontinued in 1996, its editorial team, most of them young women in their 20s, switched to being in charge of Kiss, which is why it is considered a successor to Mimi. Some artists for Mimi also worked for Kiss after its closure. Kiss later switched to a bimonthly release until early 2013 when it switched back to a monthly publication.

== Selected serializations ==
=== Current ===
- Nanatsu-ya: Shinobu and Her Jewelry Box by Tomoko Ninomiya (2013)
- Yangotonaki Ichizoku by Yukari Koyama (2017)
- Nagatan to Ao to: Ichika no Ryōrichō by Yuki Isoya (2018)
- Hey Hey Pitan! (おいおいピータン!) by Risa Itō (2018)
- Makeup Is Not (Just) Magic by Ikumi Rotta (2018)

=== Past ===
==== 1990s ====
- Sekai de Ichiban Yasashii Ongaku (世界でいちばん優しい音楽) by Mari Ozawa (1993–1999)
- Kanna-san Daiseikō Desu! (カンナさん大成功です!) by Yumiko Suzuki (1997–1999)
- Rain (ライン) by Shinobu Nishimura (1997–2005)
- Hey Pitan! (おいピータン!!, Oi Piitan!!) by Risa Itō (1998–2018)
- Baby Pop (ベイビーポップ) by Yayoi Ogawa (1999)

==== 2000s ====
- Tramps Like Us (きみはペット) by Yayoi Ogawa (2000–2005)
- Nodame Cantabile (のだめカンタービレ) by Tomoko Ninomiya (2001–2010)
- Nekosama no Iunari (ネコ様の言うなり) by Nobara Nonaka (2002–2011)
- IS – Otoko Demo Onna Demo Nai Sei (IS 男でも女でもない性) by Chiyo Rokuhana (2003–2009)
- Hotaru no Hikari (ホタルノヒカリ) by Satoru Hiura (2004–2009)
- Uni Family (ひゃほ〜♪ ウニファミリー) by Yumiko Suzuki (2005–2010)
- Tokyo Alice (東京アリス) by Toriko Chiya (2005–2015)
- Kiss & Never Cry (キス&ネバークライ) by Yayoi Ogawa (2006–2011)
- Honya no Mori no Akari (本屋の森のあかり) by Yuki Isoya (2006–2012)
- Working Pure (ワーキングピュア) by Yoko Oyamada (2007–2011)
- Wonderful Life? (ワンダフルライフ?) by Keikei (2007–2012)
- Poketto no Naka no Kiseki (ポケットの中の奇跡) by Waki Yamato (2007–2009)
- Ohitori-sama Monogatari (おひとりさま物語) by Fumiko Tanikawa (2008–2022)
- Noda to Moushimasu (野田ともうします。) by Aya Tsuge (2008–2016)
- Hanahaki Otome (花吐き乙女) by Naoko Matsuda (2008–2010)
- Kekko Kenkou Kazoku (ケッコー ケンコウ家族) by Mamoru Kurihara (2008–2011)
- Princess Jellyfish (海月姫, Kuragehime) by Akiko Higashimura (2008–2017)
- Kamihasaibu ni Yadoru no yo (神は細部に宿るのよ) by Banko Kuze (2009–2021)
- Natural (ナチュラル) by Junko Karube (2009–2010)
- Yama Ari Taniori (ヤマありタニおり) by Naoko Kusaka (2009–2010)
- Barashoku no Seisen (バラ色の聖戦) by Yukari Koyama (2009–2017)
- Shikōjo (小煌女) by Tsunami Umino (2009–2011)
- QB Karin - Keishichou Tokushu SP-ban (QBかりん 警視庁特殊SP班) by Yuriko Nishiyama (2009–2011)
- Mikake no Nijuuboshi (見かけの二重星) by Tsubana (2009–2011)

==== 2010s ====
- Hige no Ninpu (43) (ヒゲの妊婦 (43)) by Satoru Hiura (2010)
- SatoShio by Seiko Erisawa (2010–2011)
- Gin no Spoon (銀のスプーン) by Mari Ozawa (2010–2017)
- Jona Sanpo (ジョナ散歩) by Keikei (2011–2012)
- Knight of the Ice (銀盤騎士, Giban Kishi) by Yayoi Ogawa (2012–2017)
- The Full-Time Wife Escapist (逃げるは恥だが役に立つ) by Tsunami Umino (2012–2020)
- Kakafukaka (カカフカカ) by Takumi Ishida (2013–2020)
- Perfect World (パーフェクトワールド) by Rie Aruga (2014–2021)
- Tokyo Tarareba Girls (東京タラレバ娘, Tōkyō Tarareba Musume) by Akiko Higashimura (2014–2017)
- Rainy Day Serenade (涙雨とセレナーデ, Namidaame to Serenāde) by Haruka Kawachi (2014–2025)
- Burn the House Down (御手洗家、炎上する) by Moyashi Fujisawa (2017–2021)
- Mr. Bride (わたしのお嫁くん) by Natsumi Shiba (2018–2023)
- Egao no Taenai Shokuba Desu (笑顔のたえない職場です。) by Kuzushiro (2019)
- Even Though We're Adults (おとなになっても) by Takako Shimura (2019–2023)
- Paruno Graffiti (パルノグラフィティ) by Paru Itagaki (2019–2020)

==== 2020s ====
- My Lovesick Life as a '90s Otaku (古オタクの恋わずらい) by Nico Nicholson (2021–2023)
- Kujaku no Dance, Dare ga Mita? by Rito Asami (2022–2025)
- Sheltering Eaves by Rie Aruga (2022–2026)
- Kō-2 no Koi no Wasure-kata (高2の恋の忘れ方) by Kana Ozawa (2023–2025)
