= Burn the House Down (manga) =

Japanese manga series

- First tankōbon volume cover

御手洗家、炎上する (Mitarai-ke, Enjō Suru)
- Genre: Suspense; Drama
- Manga
- Written by: Moyashi Fujisawa
- Published by: Kodansha
- English publisher: NA: Kodansha USA (digital)
- Imprint: Kodansha Comics Kiss
- Magazine: Kiss
- Original run: March 25, 2017 – April 24, 2021
- Volumes: 8
- Television drama
- Directed by: Yūichirō Hirakawa; Kōji Shintoku
- Produced by: Shin'ichi Takahashi; Kei Haruna; Masahiro Uchiyama; Miho Kobayashi
- Written by: Arisa Kaneko
- Music by: Takeshi Kobayashi
- Studio: Office Crescendo
- Original network: Netflix
- Original run: July 13, 2023
- Episodes: 8
- icon

Burn the House Down (Japanese: 御手洗家、炎上する, Hepburn: Mitarai-ke, Enjō Suru; lit. 'The Mitarai Family Goes Up in Flames') is a Japanese manga series written and illustrated by Moyashi Fujisawa. It was serialized in Kodansha's josei manga magazine Kiss from March 2017 to April 2021, with its chapters collected into eight tankōbon volumes. A streaming television drama adaptation premiered in July 2023 on Netflix.

== Characters ==
Anzu Murata (村田 杏子, Murata Anzu)
Portrayed by: Mei Nagano
Makiko Mitarai (御手洗 真希子, Mitarai Makiko)
Portrayed by: Kyōka Suzuki
Kiichi Mitarai (御手洗 希一, Mitarai Kiichi)
Portrayed by: Asuka Kudo
Shinji Mitarai (御手洗 真二, Mitarai Shinji)
Portrayed by: Taishi Nakagawa
Yuzu Murata (村田 柚子, Murata Yuzu)
Portrayed by: Yuri Tsunematsu
Claire (クレア, Kurea)
Portrayed by: Kie Kitano
Satsuki Murata (村田 皐月, Murata Satsuki)
Portrayed by: Michiko Kichise
Osamu Mitarai (御手洗 治, Mitarai Osamu)
Portrayed by: Mitsuhiro Oikawa

== Media ==
=== Manga ===
Written and illustrated by Moyashi Fujisawa, Burn the House Down was serialized in Kodansha's josei manga magazine Kiss from March 25, 2017, to April 24, 2021. Eight tankōbon volumes were published from December 2017 to June 2021.

In June 2022, Kodansha USA announced that it had licensed the series for an English digital release. In October 2026, Kodansha USA announced that it would begin releasing print volumes in January 2027.

==== Volumes ====
No.	Original release date	Original ISBN	English release date	English ISBN
1	December 13, 2017	978-4-06-398033-2	June 28, 2022	978-1-63-699668-4
2	March 13, 2018	978-4-06-511121-5	July 26, 2022	978-1-68-491148-6
3	September 13, 2018	978-4-06-512958-6	August 23, 2022	978-1-68-491225-4
4	March 13, 2019	978-4-06-514796-2	September 27, 2022	978-1-68-491357-2
5	September 13, 2019	978-4-06-517045-8	October 25, 2022	978-1-68-491502-6
6	March 13, 2020	978-4-06-519004-3	November 22, 2022	978-1-68-491555-2
7	December 11, 2020	978-4-06-521402-2	December 27, 2022	978-1-68-491603-0
8	June 11, 2021	978-4-06-522427-4	January 24, 2023	978-1-68-491652-8

=== Drama ===
A television drama adaptation was announced in July 2022, starring Mei Nagano, Kyōka Suzuki and Yuri Tsunematsu. It was produced by Office Crescendo and directed by Yūichirō Hirakawa and Kōji Shintoku, based on a screenplay by Arisa Kaneko. Takeshi Kobayashi composed the music, with Shin'ichi Takahashi serving as executive producer, and Kei Haruna, Masahiro Uchiyama, and Miho Kobayashi as producers. The series premiered worldwide on Netflix on July 13, 2023. Vaundy performed the theme song "Carnival" (カーニバル).
