= Baby Pop =

Japanese manga series

- Cover of the first volume

ベイビーポップ (Beibii Poppu)
- Manga
- Written by: Yayoi Ogawa
- Published by: Kodansha
- Magazine: Kiss
- Original run: February 1999 – September 1999
- Volumes: 2

Baby Pop (Japanese: ベイビーポップ, Hepburn: Beibii Poppu) is a Japanese manga series written and illustrated by Yayoi Ogawa. It is licensed in French by Kurokawa.

== Plot ==
Nagisa has lived with her mother ever since her parents divorced in her childhood. One day her mother is killed in an accident, so now she has to live with her stepfather, Ryunosuke. But he is so nuts that she is always irritated by him

== Characters ==
- Nagisa

A first year in high school who is very intelligent. She doesn't like Ryu at first, but grows to like him. She doesn't like his perverted ways, and often hits him when he tries to do something. She likes Hanniya, and experiences her first kiss with him.

- Ryunosuke

He is a young photographer that married Nagisa's mother. His wife died on their honeymoon while getting a postcard from their hotel room in France. Although he may seem perverted and uncaring, deep inside he cares about Nagisa very much and only wishes her the best. It is said that he has thin irises which is his reason for wearing sunglasses all the time. He takes them off when he really cares about someone or when he is in a dire situation.

== Volumes ==
1. ISBN 4-06-325821-1 released in February 1999
2. ISBN 4-06-325852-1 released in September 1999
