= My Lovesick Life as a '90s Otaku =

Japanese manga series

- First tankōbon volume cover

古オタクの恋わずらい (Inishie Otaku no Koiwazurai)
- Genre: Coming-of-age; Romantic comedy
- Manga
- Written by: Nico Nicholson
- Published by: Kodansha
- English publisher: NA: Kodansha USA
- Magazine: Kiss
- Original run: June 25, 2021 – February 25, 2023
- Volumes: 4
- icon

My Lovesick Life as a '90s Otaku (Japanese: 古オタクの恋わずらい, Hepburn: Inishie Otaku no Koiwazurai) is a Japanese manga series written and illustrated by Nico Nicholson. It was serialized in Kodansha's josei manga magazine Kiss from June 2021 to February 2023, with its chapters collected in four tankōbon volumes.

== Plot ==
The series follows a female otaku (anime and manga fan) named Megumi Sato through her teenage years and her present life as a 42-year-old single mother. In 1995, Megumi was attending a new high school, and tried to keep her hobbies secret to avoid bullying. While she had a crush on the class president, Masamune Kaji, he hated otaku, causing Megumi to try to become closer to him without revealing her identity as an otaku.

== Publication ==
Written and illustrated by Nico Nicholson, My Lovesick Life as a '90s Otaku was serialized in Kodansha's josei manga magazine Kiss from June 25, 2021, to February 25, 2023. Kodansha collected its chapters in four tankōbon volumes, released from January 13, 2022, to May 12, 2023.

In November 2022, Kodansha USA announced that they had licensed the manga for English release in North America.

=== Volumes ===
No.	Original release date	Original ISBN	English release date	English ISBN
1	January 13, 2022	978-4-06-526511-6	November 28, 2023	978-1-64-651881-4
2	May 13, 2022	978-4-06-528040-9	February 27, 2024	978-1-64-651882-1
3	October 13, 2022	978-4-06-529285-3	May 14, 2024	978-1-64-651969-9
4	May 12, 2023	978-4-06-531446-3	August 6, 2024	979-8-88-877056-6
