= Sekai de Ichiban Yasashii Ongaku =

Japanese manga series

- Cover of the first volume

世界でいちばん優しい音楽
- Manga
- Written by: Mari Ozawa
- Published by: Kodansha
- Magazine: Kiss
- Original run: 1993 – 1999
- Volumes: 16
- Television drama
- Original run: May 12, 1996 – May 19, 1996
- Episodes: 2

Sekai de Ichiban Yasashii Ongaku (世界でいちばん優しい音楽; 'The World's Most Tender Music') is a Japanese manga series written and illustrated by Mari Ozawa. It was serialized in Kodansha's magazine Kiss from 1993 to 1999 and collected into 16 volumes. It won the 19th Kodansha Manga Award for shōjo manga and it was adapted into a 2-episode live-action television drama in 1996.

== Characters ==
- Sumireko Takahara (高原 菫子, Takahara Sumireko)
- Nozomi Takahara (高原 のぞみ, Takahara Nozomi)

== Volumes ==
No.	Release date	ISBN
1	September 13, 1993	978-4-06-325629-1
2	February 12, 1994	978-4-06-325642-0
3	August 9, 1994	978-4-06-325653-6
4	February 13, 1995	978-4-06-325668-0
5	August 9, 1995	978-4-06-325680-2
6	March 13, 1996	978-4-06-325691-8
7	August 9, 1996	978-4-06-325701-4
8	February 13, 1997	978-4-06-325715-1
9	July 11, 1997	978-4-06-325731-1
10	November 13, 1997	978-4-06-325749-6
11	March 13, 1998	978-4-06-325764-9
12	July 13, 1998	978-4-06-325780-9
13	November 13, 1998	978-4-06-325797-7
14	April 13, 1999	978-4-06-325827-1
15	July 13, 1999	978-4-06-325840-0
16	February 10, 2000	978-4-06-325865-3
