= Higepiyo =

Japanese manga series

ヒゲぴよ
- Genre: Comedy
- Manga
- Written by: Risa Itō
- Published by: Shueisha
- Magazine: Chorus
- Original run: 2004 – 2006
- Volumes: 1
- Anime television series
- Directed by: Atsushi Takeyama
- Written by: Natsuko Takahashi
- Music by: Toshio Masuda
- Studio: Kinema Citrus
- Original network: NHK
- Original run: 3 April 2009 – 26 February 2010
- Episodes: 39

Higepiyo (Japanese: ヒゲぴよ; lit. 'Tweet Beard') is a four-panel gag manga by Risa Itō about a small yellow bird with a beard, who ends up as a pet of a boy named Hiroshi. Serialized between 2004 and 2006 in Shueisha's Chorus magazine, the series was later compiled into a single volume on 12 January 2007. It was later adapted into an anime television series, which premiered on 3 April 2009, directed by Atsushi Takeyama, written by Natsuko Takahashi and with music by Toshio Masuda. The anime adaptation later inspired the creation of a spin-off manga series, published in Ribon magazine.

== Characters ==
- Higepiyo
- Hiroshi Haneda
- Papa
- Mama
- Katou
- Kumano Kazuo
- Inuyama
- Sarukawa
- Haruko-sensei
- Emi-chan
- Rio-chan
- Yui-chan
