= Hey Pitan! =

Japanese manga series

- First tankōbon volume cover

おいピータン!! (Oi Piitan!!)
- Manga
- Written by: Risa Itō
- Published by: Kodansha
- Magazine: Kiss
- Original run: 1998 – 2018
- Volumes: 17
- Manga

Hey Hey Pitan!
- Written by: Risa Itō
- Published by: Kodansha
- Magazine: Kiss
- Original run: 24 March 2018 – present
- Volumes: 4

Hey Pitan! (Japanese: おいピータン!!, Hepburn: Oi Piitan!!) is a Japanese manga series written and illustrated by Risa Itō. It was serialized in Kodansha's josei manga magazine Kiss from 1998 to 2018, with its chapters collected in 17 tankōbon volumes. A sequel, titled Hey Hey Pitan!, started in the same magazine in 2018.

Hey Pitan! won the 29th Kodansha Manga Award in the shōjo manga category in 2005 and the 10th Tezuka Osamu Cultural Prize's Short Manga Prize in 2006.

== Publication ==
Written and illustrated by Risa Itō, Hey Pitan! was serialized in Kodansha's josei manga magazine Kiss from 1998 to 2018. Kodansha collected its chapters in 17 tankōbon volumes; the first volume was released on 13 November 2000, and was re-released with a "revised edition" on 13 March 2003. The last volume was released on 13 March 2018.

A sequel, titled Hey Hey Pitan! (おいおいピータン!, Oi Oi Piitan!), started in the same magazine on 24 March 2018. Kodansha released the first tankōbon volume on 11 September 2020. As of 13 September 2022 four volumes have been released.

== Reception ==
Hey Pitan! won the shōjo manga category of the 29th Kodansha Manga Award in 2005, and the Short Manga Prize at the 10th Tezuka Osamu Cultural Prize in 2006.
