= Gin no Spoon =

Japanese manga and television series

- Cover of the first volume

銀のスプーン
- Manga
- Written by: Mari Ozawa
- Published by: Kodansha
- Magazine: Kiss
- Original run: July 24, 2010 – September 25, 2017
- Volumes: 17
- Television drama

Ashita mo Kitto, Oishii Gohan: Gin no Spoon
- Studio: Shochiku; Tōkai Television Broadcasting
- Original network: FNS (THK, Fuji TV)
- Original run: June 1, 2015 – July 31, 2015
- Episodes: 45

Gin no Spoon (Japanese: 銀のスプーン; 'Silver Spoon') is a Japanese manga series written and illustrated by Mari Ozawa. With the theme of the family dining table, it depicts the daily life and growth of high school boys, their families and friends who have awakened to cooking. It was serialized in Kodansha's Kiss magazine from 2010 to 2017 and collected into 17 volumes. A Japanese television drama series adaptation, Ashita mo Kitto, Oishii Gohan: Gin no Spoon (明日もきっと、おいしいご飯～銀のスプーン～; Tomorrow There Will Also Surely Be Delicious Meals ~Silver Spoon~), aired from June 1 to July 31, 2015, for 45 episodes.

== Characters ==
- Ritsu (Mahiro Takasugi)
- Kyōko (Yasuko Tomita)
- Shirabe
- Kanade

== Volumes ==
No.	Release date	ISBN
1	February 10, 2011	978-4-06-376023-1
2	June 13, 2011	978-4-06-376075-0
3	December 13, 2011	978-4-06-376170-2
4	April 13, 2012	978-4-06-376621-9
5	September 13, 2012	978-4-06-376690-5
6	January 11, 2013	978-4-06-376766-7
7	June 13, 2013	978-4-06-376841-1
8	December 13, 2013	978-4-06-376916-6
9	April 11, 2014	978-4-06-376962-3
10	September 12, 2014	978-4-06-377061-2
11	April 13, 2015	978-4-06-377143-5
12	June 12, 2015	978-4-06-377206-7
13	December 11, 2015	978-4-06-377317-0
14	May 13, 2016	978-4-06-377460-3
15	October 13, 2016	978-4-06-377530-3
16	April 13, 2017	978-4-06-377669-0
17	November 13, 2017	978-4-06-510453-8
