= Sheltering Eaves =

Japanese manga series

- First tankōbon volume cover

零れるよるに (Koboreru Yoru ni)
- Genre: Romance
- Manga
- Written by: Rie Aruga
- Published by: Kodansha
- English publisher: NA: Kodansha USA
- Imprint: KC Kiss
- Magazine: Kiss
- Original run: September 24, 2022 – October 23, 2026
- Volumes: 7

Sheltering Eaves (Japanese: 零れるよるに, Hepburn: Koboreru Yoru ni) is a Japanese manga series written and illustrated by Rie Aruga. It was serialized in Kodansha's josei manga magazine Kiss from September 2022 to October 2026.

== Synopsis ==
After having experienced child abuse at the hands of her mother, Yoru is sent to foster care and immediately becomes friends with Tenjaku. Now in their teenage years, they have one year left until they are legally required to leave foster care, and Yoru is unsure of how to confront her feelings for Tenjaku before their eventual departure.

== Publication ==
Written and illustrated by Rie Aruga, Sheltering Eaves was serialized in Kodansha's josei manga magazine Kiss from September 24, 2022, to October 23, 2026. Its chapters have been collected into seven tankōbon volumes as of July 2026.

During their panel at Anime NYC 2023, Kodansha USA announced that they had licensed the series for English publication in Q4 2024.

No.	Original release date	Original ISBN	North American release date	North American ISBN
1	March 13, 2023	978-4-06-531299-5	November 12, 2024	979-8-88877-215-7
Chapters 1–4
2	August 10, 2023	978-4-06-532464-6	January 14, 2025	979-8-88877-324-6
Chapters 5–8
3	February 13, 2024	978-4-06-534632-7	March 18, 2025	979-8-88877-325-3
Chapters 9–12
4	August 9, 2024	978-4-06-536620-2	August 5, 2025	979-8-88877-480-9
Chapters 13–16
5	February 13, 2025	978-4-06-538496-1	September 15, 2026	979-8-88877-630-8
Chapters 17–20
6	December 12, 2025	978-4-06-541741-6	January 12, 2027	979-8-88877-991-0
7	July 13, 2026	978-4-06-544232-6	—	—

== Reception ==
The series was ranked tenth in the 2024 edition of Takarajimasha's Kono Manga ga Sugoi! guidebook of the best manga for female readers.

== See also ==
- Perfect World, another manga series by the same author
