= Nagatan to Ao to: Ichika no Ryōrichō =

Japanese manga series

- First tankōbon volume cover

ながたんと青と－いちかの料理帖－
- Genre: Cooking; Historical; Romance
- Manga
- Written by: Yuki Isoya
- Published by: Kodansha
- Imprint: KC Kiss
- Magazine: Kiss
- Original run: October 25, 2017 – present
- Volumes: 16
- Television drama
- Directed by: Sōshi Matsumoto
- Written by: Izumi Kawasaki
- Music by: Gen Tanabe; Rachel Abstract
- Studio: Toei; WOWOW
- Original network: WOWOW
- Original run: March 24, 2023 – April 24, 2026
- Episodes: 20
- icon

Nagatan to Ao to: Ichika no Ryōrichō (ながたんと青と－いちかの料理帖－) is a Japanese manga series written and illustrated by Yuki Isoya. It began serialization in Kodansha's josei manga magazine Kiss in October 2017.

== Plot ==
Set in 1951 in Kyoto, the series focuses on Ichika Kuwanoki, a widow who has a kitchen knife as a memento from her late husband. After the death of her husband from the war, Ichika becomes an appetizer chef at a restaurant in a hotel, desiring to be independent. She later becomes involved in a political marriage with Amane Yamaguchi, the third son of the elite Yamaguchi family, despite their age gap of 15 years.

== Media ==
=== Manga ===
Written and illustrated by Yuki Isoya, Nagatan to Ao to: Ichika no Ryōrichō began serialization in Kodansha's josei manga magazine Kiss on October 25, 2017. The series' chapters have been collected into sixteen tankōbon volumes as of October 2026.

No.	Release date	ISBN
1	July 13, 2018	978-4-06-512160-3
2	December 13, 2018	978-4-06-513901-1
3	July 12, 2019	978-4-06-516253-8
4	July 13, 2020	978-4-06-518622-0
5	September 11, 2020	978-4-06-520751-2
6	March 12, 2021	978-4-06-522783-1
7	October 13, 2021	978-4-06-525691-6
8	April 13, 2022	978-4-06-527433-0
9	October 13, 2022	978-4-06-529289-1
10	May 12, 2023	978-4-06-531442-5
11	December 13, 2023	978-4-06-533552-9
12	June 12, 2024	978-4-06-535889-4
13	January 10, 2025	978-4-06-538157-1
14	September 12, 2025	978-4-06-540804-9
15	March 13, 2026	978-4-06-542895-5
16	October 13, 2026	978-4-06-545184-7

=== Drama ===
A live-action television drama adaptation was announced on October 5, 2022. The series was directed by Sōshi Matsumoto, with scripts written by Izumi Kawasaki and music composed by Gen Tanabe and Rachel Abstract. It starred Mugi Kadowaki and Ryuto Sakuma in lead roles. It aired from March 24 to May 26, 2023, on Wowow and aired for 10 episodes.

A second season was announced on September 4, 2025, with Kadowaki and Sakuma reprising their roles from the first season. The season aired from February 20 to April 24, 2026.

== Reception ==
The series was nominated for the 48th Kodansha Manga Award in the General category. In 2026, it was also nominated in the Daruma for Best Romance Manga category at the Japan Expo Awards.
