= Vampire Cheerleaders =

English-language manga series

- Author(s): Adam Arnold; Shiei; Michael Shelfer
- Website: http://www.vampirecheerleaders.net
- Current status/schedule: Ongoing
- Launch date: 17 January 2011
- End date: January 2015
- Publisher: Seven Seas Entertainment
- Genre(s): Action, comedy, supernatural
- Rating: Teen
- Preceded by: Aoi House
- Followed by: Paranormal Mystery Squad

Vampire Cheerleaders is an original English-language (OEL) manga series written by Adam Arnold, with art by Michael Shelfer; previously by Shiei, and published by Seven Seas Entertainment. The series follows the adventures of a squad of teenage vampires who are also cheerleaders.

== Publication history ==
Vampire Cheerleaders is the lead story in a supernatural double-feature of Vampire Cheerleaders and the Aoi House spin-off Paranormal Mystery Squad, about a team of cryptid hunters that each has some form of supernatural power, sans the main character. New updates of Vampire Cheerleaders appeared every Monday, Wednesday, and Friday at Gomanga.com and were run concurrent on the Vampire Cheerleaders Facebook page.

Vampire Cheerleaders made its print debut with 208 pages on 15 March 2011 with the release of the first volume. An ebook was also made available on the Kindle and Nook on the same date.

Vampire Cheerleaders Vol. 2 debuted with 224 pages at #7 on the New York Times Manga Best Sellers list for the week of January 1, 2012. It was originally released on Amazon on December 6, 2011.

On June 5, 2012, the first two print volumes were combined into a single 432-page omnibus containing the first two story arcs of Vampire Cheerleaders and sister series Paranormal Mystery Squad as the Vampire Cheerleaders/Paranormal Mystery Squad Monster Mash Collection. The Monster Mash Collection debuted at No. 9 on the New York Times Manga Best Sellers list for the week of June 24, 2012. Paranormal Mystery Squad has been incorporated into the archives on the Vampire Cheerleaders website.

== Plot ==
When one of Bakertown High School's vampire cheerleaders discover that one of their own is missing, Lori Thurston and the other senior cheerleaders are forced to induct one of the eleventh grade girls from the 'B Squad' into their vampiric ranks. The girls hold tryouts, choosing sheltered virgin Heather Hartley.

=== Characters ===
- Heather Hartley

A naive eleventh grader on Bakertown's 'B Squad' who gets turned into a vampire. Brought up in a strict household, her transformation lessens several of her inhibitions, such as being dutiful and obedient to her overbearing parents, whom she "glamors" into her slaves. She is unable to control her appetite in the first book

- Lori Thurston

Team captain. The queen bee and mentor of Bakertown High School's coven of "Vampire Cheerleaders." She has maintained her position as head cheerleader for decades, changing her first name and returning every 20 years posing as her "daughter". She does not hesitate to enforce her authority among the others, but treats them as an extended family. Her greatest concern is in maintaining a low profile to avoid trouble and continue living as an immortal cheerleader.

- Zoe Weller

Co-Captain. Constantly at odds with Suki due to the latter apparently killing her boyfriend.

- Suki Taft

Co-Captain (in name only). Constantly at odds with Zoe, apparently due to her killing the latter's boyfriend. Very crude and foul-mouthed.

- Lesley Chandra

Team Treasurer. The mother hen and the most kindly of the A-squad.

- Leonard Duvall

Heather's best friend. Something of a nerd, he suspects that the A-squad are vampires but Heather doesn't believe him until her transformation. He discovers the truth behind the A-squad and confronts them with intentions to expose their secret, but ultimately falls prey to Plan BC "booty call" and becomes a thrall to the A-squad.

== Volume list ==
- Vampire Cheerleaders Vol. 1. ISBN 978-1-934876-84-8. Seven Seas Entertainment, 2011
- Vampire Cheerleaders Vol. 2. ISBN 978-1-935934-06-6. Seven Seas Entertainment, 2011
- Vampire Cheerleaders/Paranormal Mystery Squad Monster Mash Collection. ISBN 978-1-935934-74-5. Seven Seas Entertainment, 2012
- Vampire Cheerleaders Must Die!. ISBN 978-1-937867-19-5. Seven Seas Entertainment, 2013
- Vampire Cheerleaders in Space...and Time?!. ISBN 978-1-626920-98-9. Seven Seas Entertainment, 2015
