= Perfect World (film) =

2018 Japanese film

- Poster
- Directed by: Kenji Shibayama
- Screenplay by: Keiko Kanome
- Based on: Manga series Perfect World by Rie Aruga
- Produced by: Hiroko Furukubo; Asami Nishi
- Starring: Hana Sugisaki; Takanori Iwata
- Cinematography: Yoko Itakura
- Edited by: Hiroaki Morishita
- Music by: Takefumi Haketa
- Production company: Horipro
- Distributed by: Shochiku; LDH pictures
- Release date: 5 October 2018 (Japan)
- Running time: 102 minutes
- Country: Japan
- Language: Japanese
- Box office: 622 million yen

Perfect World (Japanese: パーフェクトワールド 君といる奇跡, Hepburn: Pafekuto Warudo: Kimi to Iru Kiseki) is a 2018 Japanese romantic drama film based on the manga series Perfect World by Rie Aruga. Directed by Kenji Shibayama, the film depicts a love story between an architect who becomes disabled after an accident and an interior designer who develops a deep connection with him. It stars Takanori Iwata and Hana Sugisaki, supported by Kenta Suga, Sei Ashina, Aya Ōmasa, Magy, Kazue Itō, Mantaro Koichi, and Naomi Zaizen.

It was released in Japan on October 5, 2018, and grossed a total of 622 million yen.

== Plot ==
Architect Itsuki Ayukawa is paralyzed from the waist down. As the former ace of his high school basketball team, he sustained a spinal cord injury in an accident during his third year of university. Following the accident, he decided not to play basketball or pursue romantic relationships due to his reliance on a wheelchair.

Itsuki was a classmate of Tsugumi Kawana and her first love in high school. Tsugumi enjoyed drawing and aspired to attend art college but lacked confidence and gave up on the entrance exam. She subsequently joined an interior design firm in a clerical position. Itsuki and Tsugumi unexpectedly reunite at a work-related drinking session.

They are mutually attracted, but their relationship faces challenges, including parental disapproval, the emergence of a love rival, and illness, as they navigate their path toward happiness.

== Cast ==
- Takanori Iwata as Itsuki Ayukawa, an architect who is disabled in the lower part of his body due to an accident and uses a wheelchair. He was popular in high school and skilled at playing basketball.
- Hana Sugisaki as Tsugumi Kawana, an interior decorator. She had a crush on Ayukawa in high school but never revealed her feelings. They meet again in Tokyo and begin dating. She is good at drawing.
- Kenta Suga as Hirotaka Koreda, Kawana's high school friend who has strong feelings for her.
- Sei Ashina as Aoi Nagasawa, Ayukawa's care helper.
- Aya Ōmasa as Miki Yukimura, Ayukawa's ex-girlfriend.
- Magy as Tsuyoshi Watanabe, Ayukawa's boss.
- Kazue Itō as Sakiko Kawana, Kawana's mother.
- Mantaro Koichi as Motohisa Kawana, Kawana's father.
- Naomi Zaizen as Fumino Ayukawa, Ayukawa's mother.

== Release ==
Perfect World was released in Japan on October 5, 2018, in 323 cinemas. It was subsequently released in Hong Kong on November 1, 2018, followed by Korean on April 4, 2019, and Taiwan on August 7, 2020.

=== Marketing ===
On June 10, 2017, a live-action film adaptation of the manga, starring Takanori Iwata and Hana Sugisaki, was announced, with filming expected to finish in July. The first teaser was released on March 31, 2018, setting the release date for October 15, 2018. An initial poster was released on April 21, followed by the official poster on July 18 and a series of still releases from August to October. A trailer released on July 4 announced the addition of Kenta Suga and Sei Ashina to the cast. Another trailer, released on August 23, featured "Perfect World," the film's theme song by E-girls, as background music. Promotional events for fans and media, attended by the main cast including Takanori Iwata and Hana Sugisaki, were held in Tokyo on September 4, September 26, and October 6 before and after the film's release.

== Reception ==
=== Box office ===
Despite the effect of a Typhoon, the film grossed 17.38 million yen on its opening weekend and was ranked No. 4 at the Japanese box office. It grossed a total of 622 million yen.

=== Critical response ===
Film critic Toyama Shinya deemed the film an "idol film" but noted some scenes and cuts were similar to those in Yasujirō Ozu's workTokyo Story.
