= Kazue Itō =

Japanese actress (born 1966)

Kazue Itoh
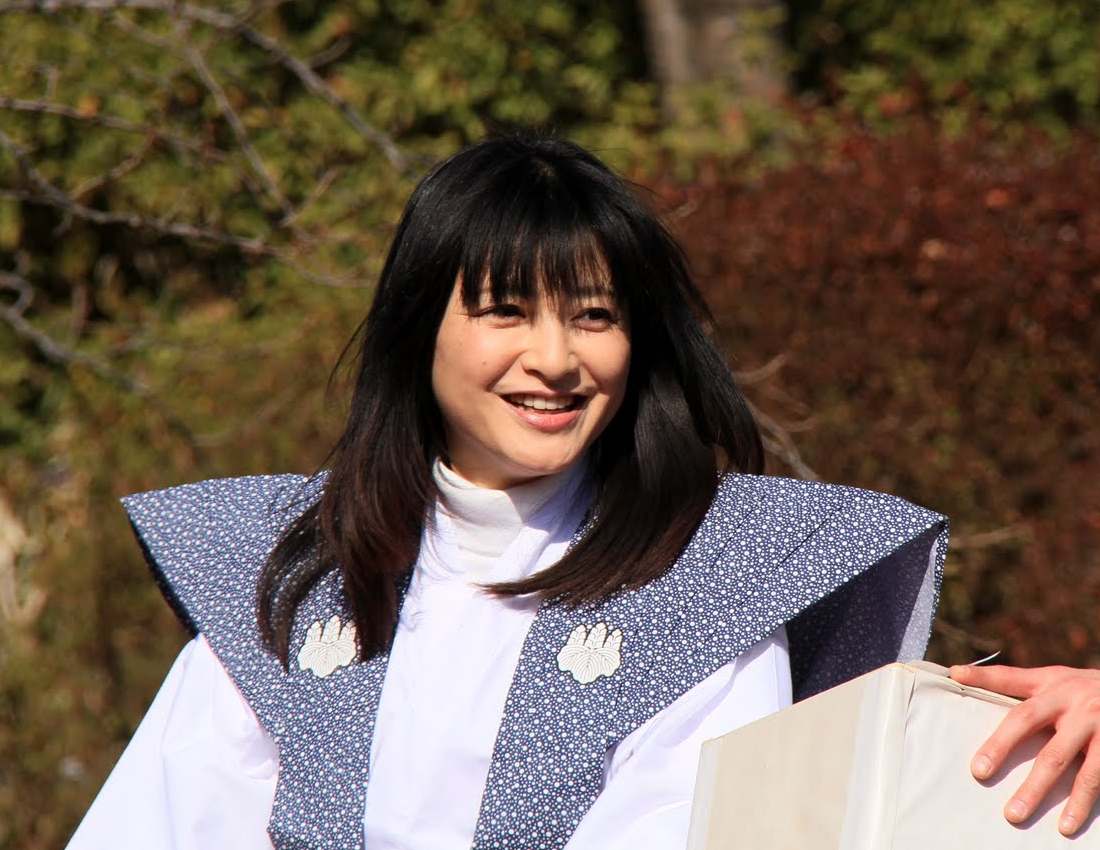
- Born: Kazue Itoh (伊藤 和枝, Itō Kazue); December 7, 1966 (age 59); Seya-ku, Yokohama, Kanagawa Prefecture, Japan
- Education: Kibogaoka Senior High School
- Occupations: actress, tarento
- Years active: 1972—present
- Agent: Horipro
- Spouse: Natchin (m. 1999; div. 2013)
- Children: 1

Kazue Itō (伊藤 かずえ, Itō Kazue; born December 7, 1966) is a Japanese actress from Seya-ku, Yokohama, Kanagawa Prefecture. She made her acting debut in 1978 as a Horipro talent and has also voiced Shura in the anime Rurouni Kenshin. She also performs as a singer, including the opening and ending theme songs for the tokusatsu series Morimori Bokkun. Itoh is best known for her portrayal of Miki Masaki (真咲 美希, Masaki Miki) in the 2007 Super Sentai Series Juken Sentai Gekiranger. She also portrayed Mako Shiraishi's mother in Samurai Sentai Shinkenger.

== Filmography ==
=== Television ===
- Ponytail wa Furimukanai (1985)
- Boys Over Flowers (2005) as Minako Yamanaka (ep. 9)
- Juken Sentai Gekiranger (2007) as Miki
- Samurai Sentai Shinkenger (2009) as former Shinkenpink/mother of Mako Shiraishi (guest)
- The Emperor's Cook (2015) as Takigawa (Lady-in-waiting of Empress Teimei)
- Mashin Sentai Kiramager (2020) as Miki
- Unbound (2025) as Matsu

=== Film ===
- Juken Sentai Gekiranger: Nei-Nei! Hou-Hou! Hong Kong Decisive Battle (2007) as Miki
- Juken Sentai Gekiranger vs Boukenger (2008) as Miki
- Engine Sentai Go-onger vs. Gekiranger (2009) as Miki
- Perfect World (2018)
- Tyida (2022)

=== Animation ===
- Rurouni Kenshin (1996) as Shura
