= Perfect World (manga) =

Japanese manga series

- Cover of the first volume

パーフェクトワールド (Pafekuto Warudo)
- Genre: Drama, romance
- Manga
- Written by: Rie Aruga
- Published by: Kodansha
- English publisher: NA: Kodansha USA
- Magazine: Kiss
- Original run: February 2014 – January 25, 2021
- Volumes: 12
- Television drama
- Directed by: Keiichirō Shiraki
- Written by: Mayumi Nakatani
- Original network: Fuji TV, Kansai TV
- Original run: April 16, 2019 – June 25, 2019
- Episodes: 10
- Live action film
- Perfect World

Perfect World (Japanese: パーフェクトワールド, Hepburn: Pafekuto Warudo) is a Japanese manga series written and illustrated by Rie Aruga. It was serialized in Kodansha's josei magazine Kiss from February 2014 to January 2021.

The series has been adapted into a live action film and TV drama in 2018 and 2019 respectively. The series has also been praised by critics and the recipient of the Kodansha Manga Award in the shōjo category in 2019.

== Plot ==
26 year old Tsugumi Kawana is reunited with her high school crush, Itsuki Ayukawa. Since they last meet, Itsuki has begun to use a wheelchair due an accident which injured his spinal cord.

== Media ==
=== Manga ===
The series is written and illustrated by Rie Aruga. It premiered in February 2014 in Kiss. In April 2019, the author revealed the series was entering its final stage. The manga ended on January 25, 2021. Kodansha published the series in 12 volumes.

In February 2018, Kodansha USA announced they licensed the series digitally. At Anime Expo 2019, they announced a print release for the series. The series is also licensed by M&C! in Indonesia.

=== Volume list ===
No.	Original release date	Original ISBN	English release date	English ISBN
1	February 13, 2015	978-4-06-340948-2	March 20, 2018 (Note: English release dates and ISBN numbers represent the digital release)	978-1-64-212190-2
2	August 12, 2015	978-4-06-340962-8	May 15, 2018	978-1-64-212238-1
3	March 11, 2016	978-4-06-340980-2	June 19, 2018	978-1-64-212288-6
4	September 13, 2016	978-4-06-340995-6	July 17, 2018	978-1-64-212317-3
5	March 13, 2017	978-4-06-398014-1	August 21, 2018	978-1-64-212395-1
6	September 13, 2017	978-4-06-398032-5	September 18, 2018	978-1-64-212474-3
7	April 13, 2018	978-4-06-511136-9	October 16, 2018	978-1-64-212508-5
8	September 13, 2018	978-4-06-513184-8	February 19, 2019	978-1-64-212649-5
9	March 13, 2019	978-4-06-514897-6	July 2, 2019	978-1-64-212925-0
10	November 13, 2019	978-4-06-517686-3	February 8, 2022	978-1-63-699687-5
11	August 12, 2020	978-4-06-520542-6	June 21, 2022	978-1-68-491286-5
12	March 12, 2021	978-4-06-522785-5	July 12, 2022	978-1-68-491311-4

=== Film ===
A live-action film adaptation was announced in the July 2017 issue of Kiss. It was directed by Kenji Shibayama and its scripts were done by Keiko Kanome. Takanori Iwata and Hana Sugisaki played the leads. It released in Japanese theaters starting on October 8, 2018. E-girls performed the film's main theme.

Hong Kong-based film distributor Infinity was originally set to release the movie in the region in October 2018, however, Hong Kong–based film distributor Neofilms released it instead. It opened in theaters there on November 1, 2018.

=== TV Drama ===
A live-action TV Drama adaptation was announced on January 30, 2019. It was directed by Keiichirō Shiraki, written by Mayumi Nakatani, and Tori Matsuzaka and Mizuki Yamamoto performed the leads. It aired on Fuji TV and Kansai TV starting on April 16, 2019. It ran for ten episodes.

== Reception ==
The series was awarded best Shōjo manga at the 43rd Kodansha Manga Awards.

Rebecca Silverman from Anime News Network praised the first volume, stating the characters were "well thought out" and the author's research in the subject was "evident", though she was a bit critical of the art, saying it can be "unflinching when it needs to be". Sean Gaffney from A Case Suitable for Treatment also praised the series for its characters and story, concluding with "it's not perfect, but I am absolutely ready to read more about this world". Demelza from Anime UK News also praised the first volume, despite having some mixed feelings on some parts of it. In their review of the second volume, they praised it for improving on some of their concerns with the previous volume, while stating it can be hard to read due to its themes.

== See also ==
- Sheltering Eaves, another manga series by the same author
