= Risa Itō =

Japanese manga artist

Risa Itō 伊藤理佐
- Born: 6 September 1969 (age 57) Hara, Suwa, Nagano, Japan
- Area: Manga artist
- Notable works: Hey Pitan! Oruchuban Ebichu
- Awards: 2005 Kodansha Manga Award for shōjo – Oi Pītan!! 2006 Tezuka Osamu Cultural Prize Short Story Award – One Woman, Two Cats, Oi Piitan!!, and Onna no Mado

Risa Itō (Japanese: 伊藤 理佐, Hepburn: Itō Risa; born 6 September 1969), also romanized as Risa Itou, is a Japanese manga artist.

She was born in 1969 in Hara Town, Suwa District in Nagano Prefecture, the eldest of three sisters. She graduated from Suwa Futaba High School and studied Formative Fine Arts at Joshibi University of Art and Design Junior College. She won the 2005 Kodansha Manga Award for shōjo for Oi Pītan!! and the 2006 Tezuka Osamu Cultural Prize Short Story Award for One Woman, Two Cats, Oi Piitan!!, and Onna no Mado. Her manga Oruchuban Ebichu ("Ebichu Minds the House") was adapted by Gainax into an anime television series. Her latest work, Higepiyo (ヒゲぴよ), serialized in Chorus magazine, was also adapted into an anime.

== Works ==
- Hey Pitan!
- One Woman, Two Cats
- Onna no Mado (おんなの窓 The Woman's window)
- Oruchuban Ebichu
- Otonaninatta joshi tachie (オトナになった女子たちへ)
- Okāsan no tobira
- Higepiyo
- Hiromi and Juliet
- paradise of Devils (悪魔の楽園)
- Myorei one isan michi (おかあさんの扉)
- Oikurotan (おいクロタン)
- Jiehun nibang (結婚泥棒)
- Kyomoyi tenki (今日もいい天気)
- Binetsuna banana (微熱なバナナ)
- Kofukuno susume (幸福のススメ)
- Sakadachi yurei (逆立ち幽霊 The Standing ghost)
- Momochin'(モモちん)
- Fissatsu! OL hikotohito (必殺!OL非事人)
- Mikkusurisa
- Yatchimatta yo ikkodate!!
- Hachinoko Risa-chan (ハチの子リサちゃん)

== Laureates ==
- 10th Tezuka Osamu Cultural Prize (2006)
