= Oruchuban Ebichu =

Japanese manga series and its adaptations

- Ebichu DVD cover by Gainax

おるちゅばんエビちゅ
- Genre: Sex comedy
- Manga
- Written by: Risa Itō
- Published by: Futabasha
- Magazine: Manga Action Pizazz
- Original run: 1990 – 2007
- Volumes: 15
- Anime television series
- Directed by: Makoto Moriwaki
- Produced by: Yasuhiro Takeda; Kayo Nakayama; Akira Kakei; Kazuaki Morijiri; Kenjirō Kawando; Satoshi Fukuyoshi (assistant)
- Written by: Chinatsu Hōjō; Genki Yoshimura
- Music by: Minami Karasuyama 6th Street Production
- Studio: Gainax (production); Group TAC (animation)
- Original network: DirecTV; Television Kanagawa
- Original run: August 1, 1999 – October 1, 1999
- Episodes: 12 (24 segments)
- Manga

Oruchuban Ebichu Chu~
- Written by: Risa Itō
- Published by: Futabasha
- Magazine: Manga Action
- Original run: 2018 – 2022
- Volumes: 3

Oruchuban Ebichu (おるちゅばんエビちゅ) (Note: Oruchuban is a mispronunciation of orusuban, a Japanese word meaning house sitting. The work has been called Ebichu the Housekeeping Hamster or Ebichu Minds the House in English.) is a Japanese manga series by Risa Itō that was published by Futabasha Publishers. It first ran through Shufutoseikatsusha magazine Giga&chan beginning in the 1990s, before moving to the Action Pizazz publication by Futabasha.

It was later adapted into an anime television series produced by Gainax, but animated by Group TAC. It first aired six eight-minute episodes in 1999 as one-third of the show Modern Love's Silliness. Oruchuban Ebichu is very adult in nature, and its comedy, explicit violence, innuendos, and sexual intercourse scenes could only be shown on DirecTV Japan. The uncut version of the series can only be found on DVD. The show is drawn in a simplistic art style.

A sequel series called Oruchuban Ebichu Chu~ started serialization in the magazine Manga Action in 2018. It concluded on October 4, 2022.

== Plot ==
Each adventure chronicles the housekeeper female hamster Ebichu, devoted to her oft-indifferent owner, who she calls Goshujin-sama ("Master") and is only identified as OL ("Office Lady"), a single 28-year-old (she is 25 years old in the anime series) who doles out cynical commentary and the occasional beating on the rodent. Such abuse is usually caused by Ebichu's almost disturbing lack of tact or propriety, which often embarrasses OL in front of other people. Ebichu is a faithful housekeeper but occasionally carries out a practical joke and also hurts OL's feelings.

Ebichu tends to take this in stride with endless praise and compliments of her master. Ebichu often attempts to correct OL's bad decisions, such as her berating of OL's obnoxious, immature and untrustworthy boyfriend that Ebichu nicknamed Kaishounachi (worthless man). Maa-kun and Lady Hanabataki are friends of OL. Some surrounding characters also appear.

== Characters ==
Ebichu (Ebisu) (エビちゅ)
Voiced by: Kotono Mitsuishi
A pet hamster who looks after her owner's house. A faithful and versatile housekeeper. She often lacks tact and plays a practical joke on people. She also often embarrasses her owner, usually getting punished as a result. At night, she becomes her secret alter-ego Ebichuman, who goes around giving people sex advice. People around Ebichu simply call her "rat" (nezumi) and usually do not refer to her by name. Ebichu likes camembert cheese and rum raisin ice cream.
Goshujin-chama (ご主人ちゃま)
Voiced by: Michie Tomizawa
Ebichu's owner. Smokes, drinks, longs to be married, and constantly beats Ebichu.
Kaishonachi (Kaishōnashi) (かいしょなち; lit. Worthless man)
Voiced by: Tomokazu Seki
Goshujin-chama's boyfriend. He is lazy, immature, and he likes pachinko. Is constantly cheating on her, but is easily forgiven. He gets easily turned on and off. Ebichu has often discovered him carrying on with other women.
Maakun (マァくん)
Voiced by: Mitsuo Iwata
A soft-spoken man who developed a sexual attraction towards Ebichu, often trying to get his girlfriend to partake in his fetish.
Hanabatake (花畑さん, Hanabatake-san)
Voiced by: Kae Araki
A friend of Goshujin-chama and a good housekeeper. She often appears surrounded by flowers, which Ebichu always comments on but the others try to ignore.
Mother of Goshujin-chama (ご主人ちゃまの母, Goshujin-chama no haha)
Mother of Goshujin-chama. She worries for her daughter.
Neighbors (お隣ちゃま, Otonari-chama)
The newly married Kobayashi couple. They just moved next door to Goshujin-chama and Ebichu in their apartment complex.

=== Other characters ===
Characters that do not appear on the TV and animated versions.

Dobukichi (どぶ吉くん, Dobukichi-kun)
A normal mouse and a friend of Ebichu. He is jealous of Ebichu's popularity.
Tanukio (タヌキオ)
A raccoon dog whose testicles grow every time he lies.

== Development ==
The origin of the anime came about during voice recording sessions for Neon Genesis Evangelion. Kotono Mitsuishi, the voice actress for the character of Misato Katsuragi, would read the Ebichu manga in between takes and laugh at the humor. She would show others what she was reading and eventually it was decided that the series was worth animating. As a result, she was selected to voice the title character Ebichu. Also, in Neon Genesis Evangelion, Misato drinks cans of Ebisu-brand beer. In one episode, though, the beer cans are labeled "Ebichu Ichiban" across the top with a small picture of a hamster with one white ear and one brown ear (like Ebichu), although the colors of its ears are on opposite sides (the hamster's brown ear is the right one, while Ebichu's brown ear is the left).

Ebichu is sometimes joked by fans to be the complete polar opposite of Hamtaro, a popular children's anime featuring a hamster in more wholesome adventures.

An Ebichu plush toy was available in UFO catchers. The opening theme of the series is "Nande Kana" (なんでかな; "Wondering"), performed by Kotono Mitsuishi. The ending theme, shared with the other shows in the Modern Love's Silliness block, is "Kumokumo Gake ni Konma Takeyafu" (くもくもがけにこんまたけやふ) by Minami Karasuyama 6th Street Production.
