= Hisashi Kagawa =

Japanese animator (born 1965)

- 香川 久
- Born: June 23, 1965 (age 61); Ehime Prefecture, Japan
- Occupations: Animator, Character Designer, Animation Director
- Years active: 1988–present
- Notable work: Sailor Moon; Phantom Thief Jeanne; Fresh Pretty Cure!; Toriko

Japanese name
- Kanji: 香川 久
- Hiragana: かがわ ひさし
- Romanization: Kagawa Hisashi

Hisashi Kagawa (Japanese: 香川 久, Hepburn: Kagawa Hisashi; born June 23, 1965) is a Japanese animator, character designer, and animation director that gained popularity for his episode animation director work for the 1990s Sailor Moon anime series. His other notable works as a character designer includes Phantom Thief Jeanne, Toriko and Fresh Pretty Cure!.

== Career ==
Hisashi Kagawa entered the anime industry in 1988, and provided various episode animation direction for the second season of Sally the Witch.

From 1992 to 1997, Kagawa then provided many key animations and episode animation direction for Sailor Moon series, and eventually provided character designs and animation direction for its two movies: Sailor Moon S: The Movie and Sailor Moon SuperS: The Movie.

After Sailor Moon had ended, from 1997 to 2008, Kagawa provided various episode animation direction for Revolutionary Girl Utena, and character designs for St. Luminous Mission High School, Phantom Thief Jeanne, Bomberman Jetters, Saikano: The Last Love Song on This Little Planet, Tai Chi Chasers, Wangan Midnight and Glass Maiden.

In 2009, Kagawa provided the character designs for one of the Pretty Cure series, titled Fresh Pretty Cure!.

In 2011, Kagawa provided the character designs for Toriko series. In 2015, Kagawa provided character design and animation director for Pumpkin Kingdom's Treasure segment in Go! Princess Pretty Cure the Movie: Go! Go!! Gorgeous Triple Feature!!!. In 2016, Kagawa provided the character design for Tiger Mask W, and that same year, Kagawa provided the animated attack sequence for Come Back! Shuriken Sentai Ninninger: Ninnin Girls vs. Boys FINAL WARS live-action sentai film.

In 2020, Kagawa provided the character designs for Oda Cinnamon Nobunaga series.

== Filmography ==
=== TV Anime ===
Year	Title	Credit	Note
1989	Sally the Witch! 2	Animation Director (eps. 18, 23, 28, 34, 40, 44, 49, 56, 61, 67, 73, 79, 85)	
1992-93	Sailor Moon	Animation Director (eps. 14, 20, 25, 32, 38, 40), Key Animation (eps. 14, 25, 44)	
1993-94	Sailor Moon R	Animation Director (eps. 5, 24, 39), Key Animation (eps. 5, 13, 17, 24, 39)	
1994-95	Sailor Moon S	Animation Director (eps. 3)	
1995-96	Sailor Moon SuperS	Animation Director (eps. 3, 8, 14, 20)	
1995-96	Wedding Peach	Key Animation (eps. 9, 29, 50)	
1996-97	Sailor Moon Sailor Stars	Key Animation (OP; eps. 1, 34)	
1997	Revolutionary Girl Utena	Animation Director (eps. 10, 17, 30), Key Animation (eps. 10, 17, 30, 34, 39)	
1999	Magic User's Club	Key Animation (eps. 4, 13)	
1999–2000	Phantom Thief Jeanne	Character Design, Animation Director (eps. 27, 34), Key Animation (eps. 34)	
2000	Pokémon	Animation Director (eps. 143)	
2001	Angelic Layer	Animation Director (eps. 4), Key Animation (4, 8)	
2002-03	Bomberman Jetters	Character Design, Animation Director (eps. 24, 29, 39, 52)	
2002-05	Saikano: The Last Love Song on This Little Planet	Character Design, Animation Director (OP, ED; eps. 5), Key Animation (eps. 1, 13)	
2003-04	Fullmetal Alchemist	Key Animation (eps. 51)	
2006	Ray The Animation	Charactet Design, Chief Animation Director, Animation Director (eps. 13)	
2007-08	Tai Chi Chasers	Character Design	
2007-08	Wangan Midnight	Character Design, Character Animation Supervisor (eps. 1–3, 6–7, 15)	
2008	Glass Maiden	Character Design, Chief Animation Director, Animation Director (OP), Key Animation (eps. 1)	
2008	Code Geass: Lelouch of the Rebellion R2	Assistant Animation Director (eps. 16)	
2009-10	Fresh Pretty Cure!	Character Design, Animation Director (eps. 24, 36, 50), Key Animation (eps. 1–3, 8, 13, 18, 24, 26, 36–37, 50)	
2011-14	Toriko	Character Design, Chief Animation Director (eps. 2–3, 5–16, 26, 43, 46, 51, 59, 68, 71, 83), Animation Director (eps. 1, 24, 34), Key Animation (ED 3 & 4; eps. 34)	
2013	Dream 9 Toriko & One Piece & Dragon Ball Z Super Collaboration Special!!	Character Design (Toriko), Chief Animation Director (Toriko), Key Animation	
2014-15	Mysterious Joker	Key Animation (OP1-2)	
2014-15	Majin Bone	Animation Director (eps. 16, 23, 34, 45, 51), Key Animation (eps. 16, 23, 29, 34, 40, 45, 51)	
2015	Go! Princess PreCure	Key Animation (eps. 11)	
2015	Dragon Ball Super	Key Animation (OP)	
2015	The Disappearance of Nagato Yuki-chan	Animation Director (OP; eps. 10, 13), Key Animation (eps. 1, 10)	
2016	Tiger Mask W	Character Design, Chief Animation Director (eps. 1–7, 12–13, 22, 28), Animation Director (eps. 18, 27, 32, 37)	
2019	Dororo	Key Animation (OP2)	
2020	Oda Cinnamon Nobunaga	Character Design, Chief Animation Director	
2020-22	Dragon Quest: The Adventure of Dai	Chief Animation Director (eps. 8, 11, 13, 15, 17, 19, 21, 23, 25, 27, 29, 31, 35, 38, 41, 45, 49, 54, 57, 61, 65, 69, 73, 78, 84, 88, 92, 95, 98), Animation Director (eps. 100), Key Animation (eps. 73, 98)	
2024	Bucchigiri?!	Key Animation (eps. 7)	

=== Anime film ===
Year	Title	Credit	Note
1993	Sailor Moon R: The Movie	Key Animation	
1994	Sailor Moon S: The Movie	Character Design, Animation Director	
1995	Sailor Moon SuperS: The Movie	Character Design, Animation Director	
1999	Pikachu's Rescue Adventure	Key Animation	Short feature released alongside Pocket Monsters the Movie: Revelation Lugia
1999	Adolescence of Utena	Key Animation	
2000	Pocket Monsters the Movie: Emperor of the Crystal Tower-ENTEI	Character Design, Chief Animation Director	
2005	Futari wa Pretty Cure Max Heart the Movie	Key Animation	
2005	Futari wa Pretty Cure Max Heart the Movie 2: Friends of the Snow-Laden Sky	Key Animation	
2009	Pretty Cure All Stars DX: Everyone's Friends - The Collection of Miracles!	Original Character Design (Fresh Pretty Cure!)	
2009	Fresh Pretty Cure! the Movie: The Toy Kingdom has Lots of Secrets!?	Character Design	
2010	Pretty Cure All Stars DX2: Light of Hope - Protect the Rainbow Jewel!	Original Character Design (Fresh Pretty Cure!), Key Animation	
2010	HeartCatch PreCure! the Movie: Fashion Show in the Flower Capital…Really?!	Assistant Animation Director	
2011	Pretty Cure All Stars DX3: Deliver the Future! The Rainbow-Colored Flower That Connects the World	Original Character Design (Fresh Pretty Cure!), Key Animation	
2011	Buddha: The Great Departure	Animation Director	
2011	Toriko 3D: Kaimaku! Gourmet Adventure!!	Character Design, Key Animation	
2012	Pretty Cure All Stars New Stage: Friends of the Future	Original Character Design (Fresh Pretty Cure!), Key Animation	
2013	Pretty Cure All Stars New Stage 2: Friends of the Heart	Original Character Design (Fresh Pretty Cure!)	
2013	Toriko the Movie: Secret Recipe of the Gourmet God!	Character Design	
2014	Pretty Cure All Stars New Stage 3: Eternal Friends	Original Character Design (Fresh Pretty Cure!)	
2015	Pretty Cure All Stars: Spring Carnival	Original Character Design (Fresh Pretty Cure!), Key Animation	
2015	Go! Princess Pretty Cure the Movie: Go! Go!! Gorgeous Triple Feature!!!	Character Design (Pumpkin Kingdom's Treasure), Animation Director (Pumpkin Kingdom's Treasure)	
2016	Pretty Cure All Stars: Singing with Everyone Miraculous Magic!	Original Character Design (Fresh Pretty Cure!), Key Animation	
2016	Pop in Q	Key Animation	
2017	Kirakira Pretty Cure a la Mode the Movie: Crisply! The Memory of Mille-feuille!	Assistant Animation Director	
2018	Pretty Cure Super Stars!	Character Design, Chief Animation Director	
2018	Hug! Pretty Cure Futari wa Pretty Cure: All Stars Memories	Original Character Design (Fresh Pretty Cure!)	
2018	The Seven Deadly Sins the Movie: Prisoners of the Sky	Key Animation	
2019	Pretty Cure Miracle Universe	Original Character Design (Fresh Pretty Cure!)	
2021	Pretty Guardian Sailor Moon Eternal The Movie	Key Animation (Part 1)	2-Part film, Season 4 of Sailor Moon Crystal (Dead Moon arc)
2022	One Piece Film: Red	Key Animation	
2023	Pretty Cure All Stars F	Original Character Design (Fresh Pretty Cure!), Key Animation	
2023	Birth of Kitarō: The Mystery of GeGeGe	Key Animation	

=== OVA (Original Video Animation) ===
Year	Title	Credit	Note
1996-97	Magic User's Club	Key Animation (eps. 4, 6)	
2005	Saikano: Another Love Song	Character Design, Key Animation	
2011	Valkyria of the Battlefield 3: The Wound Taken from Someone's Sake	Key Animation (OP)	

=== Live-Action ===
Year	Title	Credit	Note
2016	Come Back! Shuriken Sentai Ninninger: Ninnin Girls vs. Boys FINAL WARS	Key Animation	Live-action direct-to-video film Animated attack sequence.

== Bibliography ==
- 香川久 東映アニメーションプリキュアワークス [Hisashi Kagawa: Toei Animation Pretty Cure Works] (in Japanese). Ichijinsha. July 23, 2016. ISBN 978-4-7580-1515-8.
- Hisashi Kagawa; Yoshihiko Umakoshi (May 13, 2017). Drawing Fantastic Female Fighters 香川久×馬越嘉彦 バトルヒロイン作画&デザインテクニック [Hisashi Kagawa x Yoshihiko Umakoshi: Battle Heroine Drawing & Design Technique] (in Japanese). Genskosha. ISBN 978-4-7683-0856-1.
