= Mistress Fortune =

Shōjo manga by Arina Tanemura

- Cover of the original Japanese volume featuring Kisaki and Giniro

絶対覚醒天使ミストレス☆フォーチュン (Zettai Kakusei Tenshi Misutoresu Fōchun)
- Genre: Fantasy, romance
- Manga
- Written by: Arina Tanemura
- Published by: Shueisha
- English publisher: NA: Viz Media
- Imprint: Ribon Mascot Comics
- Magazine: Ribon
- Original run: July 2008 – September 2008
- Volumes: 1

Mistress Fortune (絶対覚醒天使ミストレス☆フォーチュン, Zettai Kakusei Tenshi Misutoresu Fōchun; lit. Absolute Awakening Angel Mistress Fortune) is a Japanese shōjo manga series written and illustrated by Arina Tanemura. The series debuted in the July 2008 issue of Ribon. It ran for a total of three chapters, ending in the September 2008 issue. Mistress Fortune was published in a single tankōbon in Japan by Shueisha on December 25, 2008.

== Characters ==
=== ESPers ===
- Kisaki Tachikawa is a 14-year-old second year junior high student who moonlights as the ESPer Fortune Tiara. Kisaki is in love with Giniro Hashiba. She is the only known ESPer to possess the special Planet Photon electromagnetic waves.
- Giniro Hashiba is a 14-year-old genius ESPer, known as Fortune Quartz. He is also a second year junior high school student, but at a different school than Kisaki. When Giniro's ESP powers first appeared at age 5, they were so strong that they blew up his home and family; His father and older sister died and his mother has been in a coma for the past 9 years since the beginning of the story. Due to those events he now lives at PSI headquarters and claims he has a debt to Commander Hakase. He claims that Maron and Meroko (from Tanemura's Kamikaze Kaitou Jeanne and Full Moon o Sagashite respectively) are the idols of his heart. Giniro admits that he is in love with Kisaki in the third chapter.
- Gunjo Hakase is the commander of PSI and a known slacker.

=== Other Humans ===
- Kagami Ichigaya is Kisaki's best friend and classmate. Kagami is also the only one outside of PSI to know that Kisaki is an ESPer. She is one of the girls Ebeko pulls into her tornado.
- Kisaki's mother is another of the women pulled into Ebeko's tornado. She is often seen asking Kisaki to do her homework. She is extremely excited when Hakase tells her that Kisaki has been offered an opportunity to go to America, though she doesn't know why Kisaki has been offered the opportunity, as she is unaware that Kisaki is an ESPer.
- Giniro's mother has been in a coma for the past nine years, due to the events that occurred when Giniro's ESP powers first appeared. Kisaki discovers that they are able to communicate with her using their ESP powers of telepathy.
- Nancy Thistlethwaite is a member of PSI in America who asks Kisaki to help them out with an EBE at their American headquarters in San Francisco, California. The character's name comes from Tanemura's English editor at Viz Media.

=== Ebes ===
Ebes (Extraterrestrial Biological Entities) are aliens, who are presumed to be trying to invade Earth, that come in all different shapes and sizes. There are at least 5 different levels of power for the Ebes.

- Ebeko is one of the first Ebes shown in the manga; She is originally a Level 5 Ebe and is the only Ebe seen to be able to communicate with humans verbally. She was given to Kisaki by her friend, Kagami, supposedly as a plush toy that was to grant Kisaki luck in her love life. Ebeko could read thoughts and granted Kisaki's wish for all the other girls in the world to disappear so that Giniro would only look at her. After Ebeko was stopped and subsequently captured, she started working with Mistress Fortune and the PSI group in exchange for her freedom. On her first mission with Mistress Fortune, she was named Ebeko by Giniro. She complained that no thought was put into her name and that she wanted to be named something like Maron or Meroko (both from other Tanemura manga).

== Media ==
=== Manga ===
Other than the three main chapter of the series, there were three side stories created by Tanemura. The first ran in the 2008 Summer Special edition of Ribon, the second in the November 2008 issue of Ribon magazine, and the third in the 2008 Winter Special edition of Ribon alongside a Gentlemen's Alliance oneshot. The only volume of Mistress Fortune containing all three main chapters and two of the side stories was released on December 25, 2008. Shueisha included a double-sided poster in the first editions. Viz Media announced a license for the series at their 2010 Anime Expo panel. The series is also licensed by Tokyopop in Germany and Panini Comics in Italy.

=== Vomic ===
An internet vomic (a portmanteau of the words voice and comic) in four parts covering the first 2 chapters of the series was created and published by Shueisha. The vomic featured Ai Matayoshi as Kisaki, Kenichi Suzumura as Giniro, Junji Majima as Gunjo Hakase, Chiwa Saitō as Ebeko, and Ayumi Fujimura as Kagami. The vomic was first announced in the September 2008 issue of Ribon.

== Reception ==
The English version published by Viz Media received generally positive reviews. Leroy Douresseaux of the Comic Book Bin gave the volume a B+, noting that it is, "It is lighthearted fun as only Tanemura can do it." Carlo Santos of Anime News Network noted that it was too short, but that, "it's still a surprisingly fun take on the ESPer action-adventure genre—and the handful of in-jokes for American readers nudge it up to a B." Matthew Warner of Mania.com also gave the volume a B, calling it a "tad generic," but an "interesting read." Karen Maeda of Sequential Tart was not so favorable, giving the volume a 5 out of 10 and suggesting that readers stick to other Tanemura works, as Mistress Fortune can be "too unrealistic and weird to want to bother with." The School Library Journal listed Mistress Fortune as one of "39 Graphic Novels that Kids Can't Resist," suggesting it for grades 6–8.
