= I.O.N (manga) =

Manga

- Cover of the original Japanese release of I.O.N published by Shueisha

イ·オ·ン
- Genre: Fantasy, romance
- Manga
- Written by: Arina Tanemura
- Published by: Shueisha
- English publisher: NA: Viz Media
- Imprint: Ribon Mascot Comics
- Magazine: Ribon
- Original run: June 1997 – November 1997
- Volumes: 1

I.O.N (イ·オ·ン) is a Japanese manga series written and illustrated by Arina Tanemura. Originally serialized in Ribon from May to November 1997, the six chapters were collected and published in a single tankōbon volume by Shueisha in December 1997. The series was originally intended to be only three chapters, but Ribon had her lengthen it to six chapters. On October 22, 2010, a bonus chapter of the manga was published in the Ribon Fantasy Zokan Go magazine.

The series is licensed for English language release in North America by Viz Media, which published its single volume on April 1, 2008. It is also licensed for regional language releases in Spain by Planeta DeAgostini and in Germany in Egmont Manga & Anime.

== Plot ==
Ion Tsuburagi (粒 依音, Tsuburagi Ion) is a friendly and cheerful high-school student who likes to eat. When she was young, she had learned how to chant a jinx to make miracles occur, which involves her spelling out her first name as if it were a magic spell. Ion has a crush on a boy named Mikado Hōrai (宝来 帝, Hourai Mikado), who's interested in psychic powers, and has his own lab at school. When she finds out that he has a club for psychic researchers, she plans to join the club and ends up becoming its president. During one of Mikado's experiments, she touches an object similar to one that her late father made which she swallowed as a child and gains two psychic powers: telekinesis and levitation, which she activates by chanting her jinx, and begins using them to save people from getting seriously hurt.

The student body president, Koki Shiraishi (白石 広貴, Shiraishi Kōki), has feelings for Ion, though she has never returned his feelings, instead regularly avoiding him. He hates psychic powers and Mikado, because Mikado studies them, unaware of Ion's powers. Even after Ion's feelings for Mikado become obvious to him, Koki continues to pursue her.

Ai Minase (水瀬 藍, Minase Ai), Mikado's ex-girlfriend, transfers to their school to be with Mikado. Also psychic, she can bend spoons and sense card types, though her powers can go out of control if she doesn't concentrate. Though she knows he only dated her because she was his test subject, she is initially jealous of his affections toward Ion. Eventually she realizes she doesn't really like him and befriends Ion after Ion saves her from harm during another experiment.

As the series progresses, Mikado begins to return Ion's feelings, though he is initially confused as to whether it is the same as with Ai and he just likes her because she is a test subject. Eventually, he realizes he does love her as a girl, not an experiment, after Ion appears to lose her powers. At the end of the story, they become a couple and it is shown that Ion's powers have returned.

== Background ==
According to Tanemura, she conceived the story of I.O.N after hearing someone discussing positive ions while watching a science program on the NHK. Ion's last name was taken from the kanji for the word "particles". Tanemura described Ai Minase as a "bad-loser burriko," that is, a girl who acts younger than her age. Her name comes from Tanemura's friend and assistant who is also a professional manga artist, Ai Minase. Tanemura returned to the series with a bonus chapter in 2010, 13 years after the series concluded. The chapter was first published in Ribon Fantasy Zōkan-gō and then later as an extra in the eighth volume of Sakura Hime: The Legend of Princess Sakura.

== Media ==
=== Manga ===
No.	Original release date	Original ISBN	English release date	English ISBN
1	December 9, 1997 (tankōban); May 18, 2011 (bunkoban)	4-08-856053-1 (tankōban); 978-4-08-619248-4 (bunkoban)	April 1, 2008	978-1-4215-1800-8

== Reception ==
The English edition of I.O.N placed 18th on BookScan's top 20 graphic novel list for April 2008, covering sales between March 31 and April 27. The manga placed 45 of 50 in a list of the top 50 manga properties for summer 2008, which reflects the sales from May, June, and the first half of July 2008.

A Publishers Weekly reviewer felt the story was satisfying and well-drawn, but found it to be poorly paced and felt the art often contains too much decoration, noting that "even Tanemura admits her early artwork contains too many decorative patterns based on strawberries, irises, lace and newsprint."
