= Idol Dreams =

Japanese manga series

- Cover of the Japanese version of vol. 1, first released on March 25, 2014

31☆アイドリーム (Sātī Wan Ai Dorīmu)
- Genre: Romance, drama
- Manga
- Written by: Arina Tanemura
- Published by: Hakusensha
- English publisher: NA: Viz Media
- Imprint: Hana to Yume Comics Melody
- Magazine: Melody
- Original run: April 27, 2013 – present
- Volumes: 7

Idol Dreams (Japanese: 31☆アイドリーム, Hepburn: Sātī Wan Ai Dorīmu; Thirty-one I Dream in Japan) is a Japanese manga written and illustrated by Arina Tanemura. Idol Dreams is serialized in the bimonthly josei manga magazine Melody since 2013. The manga has been on hiatus since August 2020.

== Plot ==
Chikage Deguchi, a 31-year-old office worker, believes her life to be dull and full of missed opportunities. She is nostalgic for when she was 15 years old, which she believes to be at her prime. During her middle school reunion, Chikage becomes humiliated when her class discovers that she has never had a boyfriend, and when she plans on confessing to her former classmate, Haruki Kunitachi, she becomes crushed when she learns he has a girlfriend.

When Kanshi Tokita, another former classmate, finds her, he offers her an experimental drug that can change her body to her 15-year-old self for 5–6 hours. After Chikage takes it, she is suddenly scouted to become an idol, and she decides to take the chance to make the most of what she missed out when she was younger. Going under the name Akari Deguchi as her 15-year-old self, Chikage begins to lead a double life.

== Characters ==
Chikage Deguchi (出口千影, Deguchi Chikage)
Chikage is a 31-year-old office worker who is unconfident with herself and embarrassed for never having a boyfriend. With an experimental drug, she can change into her 15-year-old self for 5-6 hours and names her alter-ego Akari Deguchi (出口あかり, Deguchi Akari). As Akari, she becomes an idol.
Kanshi Tokita (都北完士, Tokita Kanshi)
Tokita is Chikage's classmate from middle school and a pharmacist who introduced her to a drug that can change her into her 15-year-old self. He has been in love with Chikage ever since she helped him when he was bullied and struggles to balance his feelings for her and his fiance, Hinagiku.
Hibiki Maido (舞堂響, Maidō Hibiki)
Hibiki is a 15-year-old idol and the face of the boy band Valentine, who Chikage feels bears a resemblance to Haru. He is a musical prodigy and his insistence at perfection puts him at odds with his bandmates, but Hibiki plans on eventually becoming a music producer after his idol activities end. He is the older brother of Kanade from Neko to Watashi no Kinyōbi.
Mashiro (真白, Mashiro)
Nicknamed Ru (るーくん, Rū-kun) for his mushroom-like hairstyle, Ru is a member of Valentine who initially disagrees with Hibiki and threatens to quit the group, but Akari persuades him to stay. Akari later agrees to date him later in the story.
Yuko Nikaido (二階堂ゆこ, Nikaidō Yuko)
Yuko is an upcoming idol whose music was produced by Hibiki, but she ran away before her debut showcase, leaving Akari to take her spot.
Haruki Kunitachi (国立悠輝, Kunitachi Haruki)
Nicknamed Haru (ハルくん, Haru-kun), he was one of the class representatives along with Chikage in middle school, and Chikage has been in love with him since.
Hinagiku Hanami (花美雛菊, Hanami Hinagiku)
Hinagiku is Chikage's co-worker and later revealed to be Tokita's fiance.

== Media ==
=== Manga ===
Originally titled Thirty-one I Dream in Japan, the series is written and illustrated by Arina Tanemura. It is serialized in the bimonthly magazine Melody since April 27, 2013. The chapters were later released in 7 bound volumes by Hakusensha under the Hana to Yume Comics Melody imprint. While writing the series, Tanemura announced that several characters from Neko to Watashi no Kinyōbi, which ran concurrently in Margaret, would be making minor appearances.

The limited edition of volume 3 was bundled with a character song CD for Tokita, featuring the song "Sakura-iro Time Trip" (桜色Time trip) with lyrics written by Tanemura. Tokita was voiced by Ryohei Kimura, who had provided the voice for Eichi Sakurai in the anime adaptation of Full Moon o Sagashite, one of Tanemura's previous works.

In 2015, Viz Media licensed the series for North American distribution in English, under the title Idol Dreams and with the Shojo Beat imprint. Volume 4 was originally slated to be released on November 7, 2017, but was delayed due to a fire in the warehouse storing the books.

The series went on an hiatus starting with the October 2020 issue of Melody, and has not resumed serialization since. The seventh volume was the last one to be released before that indefinite break.

No.	Original release date	Original ISBN	English release date	English ISBN
1	March 25, 2014	978-4-5922-1721-3	November 3, 2015	978-1-4215-8256-6
2	December 25, 2014	978-4-5922-1722-0	March 1, 2016	978-1-4215-8257-3
3	December 18, 2015	978-4-5922-1723-7 (regular edition); ISBN 978-4-5921-0563-3 (limited edition character song CD bundle)	September 16, 2016	978-1-4215-8856-8
4	November 4, 2016	978-4-5922-1724-4	November 28, 2017	978-1-4215-9589-4
5	August 4, 2017	978-4-5922-1725-1	November 6, 2018	978-1-9747-0070-7
6	July 5, 2018	978-4-5922-1806-7	August 6, 2019	978-1-9747-0664-8
7	July 3, 2020	978-4-5922-1807-4	July 6, 2021	978-1-9747-1543-5

==== Chapters not yet in tankōbon format ====
- 40. (released in the August 2020 issue of Melody.)

== Reception ==
Anime News Network named Idol Dreams as the "best reworking [manga] of an old genre" in 2015, comparing it to age-shifting idols like Fancy Lala and Creamy Mami. Rebecca Silverman from Anime News Network praised the first volume, comparing it to the similar themes from Tanemura's previous work Full Moon o Sagashite, and stated it appealed to older fans who grew up with her work. Likewise, Silverman praised the second volume for exploring Tokita's character, and the inclusion of Tanemura's interview with LaLa Melody Online provided more detail on the series' concept.

Volume 1 debuted at #19 on Oricon and sold 49,107 copies in its first week. Volume 3 debuted at #44 on Oricon and sold 19,704 copies in its first week. Volume 4 debuted at #42 on Oricon and sold 15,127 copies in its first week and 31,762 copies overall.
