= Shunkan Lyle =

Japanese manga series

- First tankōbon volume cover

瞬間ライル (Shunkan Rairu)
- Genre: Fantasy
- Manga
- Written by: Arina Tanemura
- Illustrated by: Yui Kikuta
- Published by: Ichijinsha
- Imprint: Zero Sum Comics
- Magazine: Monthly Comic Zero Sum
- Original run: October 28, 2015 – April 28, 2018
- Volumes: 4

Shunkan Lyle (Japanese: 瞬間ライル, Hepburn: Shunkan Rairu) is a Japanese manga series written by Arina Tanemura and illustrated by Yui Kikuta. It was serialized in Ichijinsha's josei manga magazine Monthly Comic Zero Sum from October 2015 to April 2018, with its chapters collected in four tankōbon volumes.

== Publication ==
Written by Arina Tanemura and illustrated by Yui Kikuta, Shunkan Lyle was serialized in Ichijinsha's josei manga magazine Monthly Comic Zero Sum. Its first installment was published in the magazine's December 2015 issue on October 28, 2015, The series finished its final installment in the June 2018 issue of Monthly Comic Zero Sum, published on April 28, 2018. Ichijinsha collected its chapters in four tankōbon volumes, released from May 25, 2016, to May 25, 2018.

=== Volumes ===
No.	Release date	ISBN
1	May 25, 2016	978-4-75-803186-8; 978-4-75-803187-5 (SE); 978-4-75-803188-2 (SE)
2	November 25, 2016	978-4-75-803237-7; 978-4-75-803238-4 (SE)
3	August 25, 2017	978-4-75-803308-4; 978-4-75-803309-1 (SE)
4	May 25, 2018	978-4-75-803349-7
