= Arina Tanemura =

Japanese manga artist (born 1978)

- 種村 有菜
- Born: March 12, 1978 (age 48); Aichi Prefecture, Japan
- Other name: Meguro Teikoku (目黒帝国)
- Occupations: Manga artist; illustrator; character designer
- Years active: 1995–present
- Employer: Shueisha (1995–2011)
- Known for: Phantom Thief Jeanne; Full Moon o Sagashite; The Gentlemen's Alliance Cross; Idolish7
- Website: tanemuraarina.com

Signature
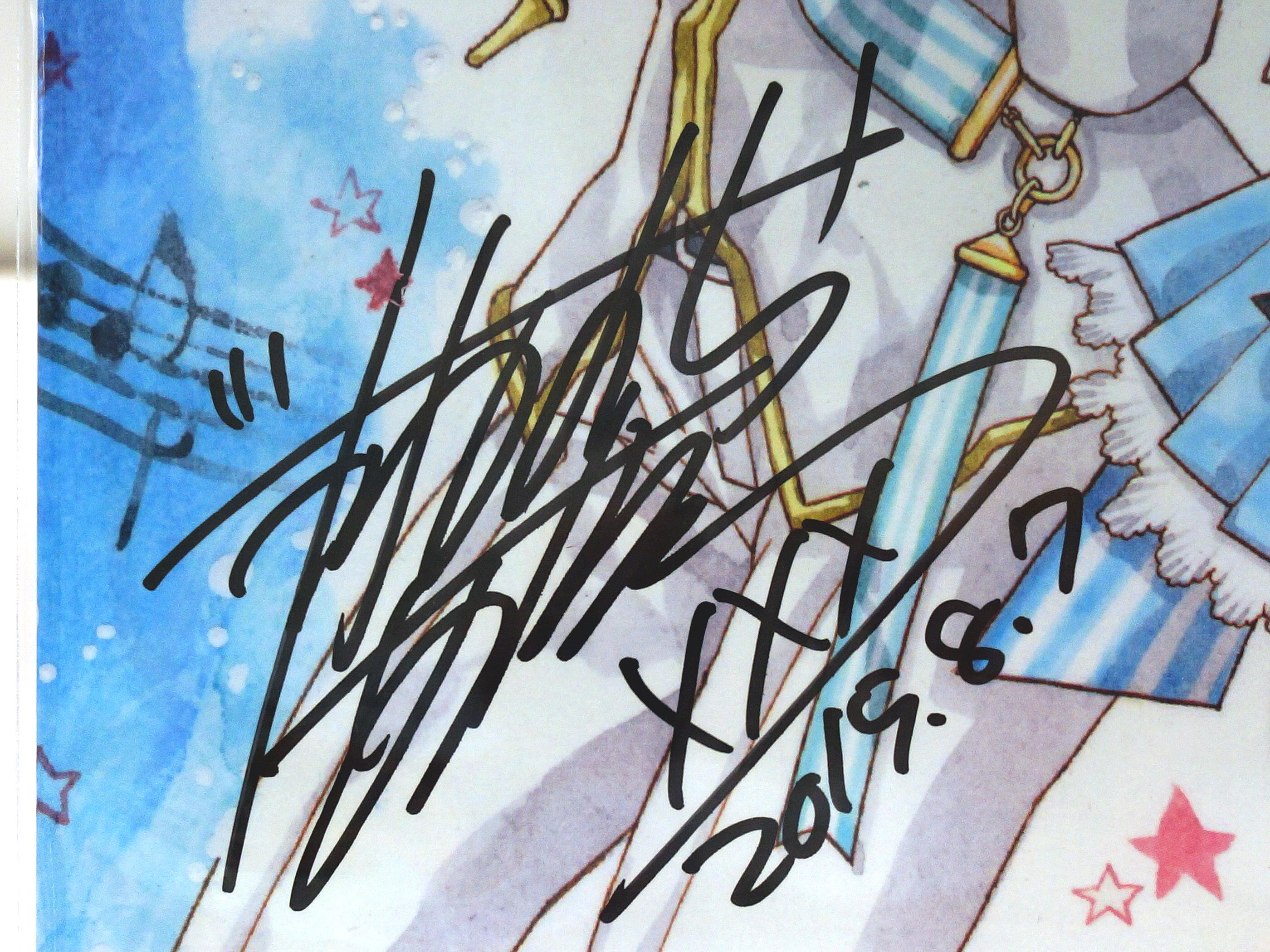

Arina Tanemura (種村 有菜, Tanemura Arina; born March 12, 1978) is a Japanese manga artist, illustrator, and character designer. She made her professional manga debut in 1996 with the one-shot The Style of the Second Love in the shōjo manga magazine Ribon Original and later published her first series, I.O.N, in 1997, in the main Ribon magazine. She gained mainstream popularity from the late 1990s to mid-2000s with her series Phantom Thief Jeanne, Full Moon o Sagashite, and The Gentlemen's Alliance Cross.

Throughout her career, Tanemura's work has been recognized in shōjo manga for her art style and themes of young girls transforming into the women they would like to become. In addition to her publications, Tanemura has released two independent studio albums of songs based on her characters and is the character designer for Idolish7 and other media projects.

== Early life ==
Arina Tanemura was born on March 12, 1978. Tanemura grew up in Aichi Prefecture. Her main source of entertainment was manga magazines because her local television stations only ran re-runs of older anime series, and she was unable to watch new shows. When she was in nursery school, her mother would often buy manga magazines aimed at an older female demographic, such as Bessatsu Margaret, Bessatsu Friend, and Bessatsu Shōjo Comic. Her older brother, on the other hand, often read Weekly Shonen Jump. While in elementary school, Tanemura's friend lent her a copy of Ribon, and she became fascinated with its childish art style, later convincing her mother's co-worker to buy her a copy. Throughout elementary school, she also read Margaret regularly, and she began reading Shōjo Comic in junior high school.

Tanemura began drawing at the age of 5. She was heavily influenced by shōjo manga works from her childhood, and she mostly drew female characters. She started drawing manga beginning in spring break of her first year in high school, during which she stated she made her first submission to an amateur manga contest. At the same time, her female cousin had expressed interest in reading a story about a character Tanemura had drawn for her multiple times. Tanemura described her submission as a "dark" and "sad" story about the main character's boyfriend dying in a traffic accident and later being approached by his brother. Despite not winning, she later stated that she had passed the first round and earned ¥2,000 from the contest. Afterwards, she began practicing by drawing yonkoma.

== Career ==
=== 1996–1998: Debut and early fame ===
Tanemura debuted professionally at the age of 18 in 1996. Her debut work was a short comic titled The Style of the Second Love, which was published in the shōjo manga magazine Ribon Original. Despite being published in a sister magazine of the main Ribon, Tanemura stated that the story received positive feedback, and that she received 500 fan letters after it was serialized. The comic, along with her other short works, was later reprinted in the anthology Short-Tempered Melancholic. In 1997, Tanemura released I.O.N, her first series.

=== 1998–2011: Mainstream popularity ===
From 1998 to 2000, Tanemura worked on Phantom Thief Jeanne. Phantom Thief Jeanne was successful, selling a cumulative total of 5,500,000 print copies. After Phantom Thief Jeanne ended, Tanemura followed up with Time Stranger Kyoko, but because the protagonist's "strong personality" failed to appeal to the editors and reader demographic, she was forced to end it after a year with 12 chapters. From 2002 to 2004, Tanemura worked on Full Moon o Sagashite, a story centered on an idol singer. Tanemura, having once wanted to become a lyricist, created the series out of a desire to write lyrics. Due to the negative feedback from Time Stranger Kyoko, this time, she gave the protagonist a subdued personality.

The popularity of Phantom Thief Jeanne and Full Moon o Sagashite led both works to receive television anime adaptations. Time Stranger Kyoko also received an anime adaptation and was screened as a short film at the 2001 Ribon Festival. For Full Moon o Sagashite, Tanemura also recorded a cover version of Changin' My Life's "Smile" titled "Smile (Arina's Vocal Version)", which was released on the soundtrack album Full Moon o Sagashite: Full Moon Final Live.

In 2004, Tanemura published The Gentlemen's Alliance Cross, which ran in Ribon until 2008. Unlike her previous series, The Gentlemen's Alliance Cross contained no fantasy elements. She provided the voice for Maora Ichinomiya and the Postman for the limited edition drama CD. Afterwards, she published Mistress Fortune, making her the first artist who ended and debuted a new series in the same issue of Ribon. Tanemura wrote Mistress Fortune as a "middle school romance" and intentionally made the story more light-hearted compared to The Gentlemen's Alliance Cross. Later in 2008, she launched Sakura Hime: The Legend of Princess Sakura.

From 2008 to 2009, Tanemura hosted her own online radio program, Tanemura Arina de Kyan: Manga Seminar, on Niconico Douga. To commemorate the 15th anniversary of her debut, Tanemura released an independent album titled Junai Tenshi on December 29, 2010, at Comic Market 79 under the circle name "Meguro Teikoku", with songs based on ten of her main female characters from her previous works. The album features vocals and lyrics from Tanemura, and she performed several songs live during her autograph event at Animate on March 6, 2011. While she had written lyrics to songs before, the CD project had come from her desire to write lyrics without having them altered by professional lyricists. After the 2011 Tōhoku earthquake and tsunami, Tanemura contributed to a dōjinshi anthology with other manga artists that was sold for charity efforts. From July to November 2011, she launched Fudanjuku Monogatari in Margaret, a manga adaptation featuring fictional portrayals of the idol girl group Fudanjuku. Tanemura had decided to draw the manga after they had expressed interest in cosplaying as her characters.

=== 2011–present: Departure from Ribon, Idolish7 ===
Beginning in May 2011, to celebrate Tanemura's 15th debut anniversary, Shueisha began reprinting I.O.N, Phantom Thief Jeanne, Time Stranger Kyoko, and Full Moon o Sagashite in bunkoban format. In November 2011, Tanemura ended her exclusive contract with Ribon to work freelance, her last work with the magazine being Sakura Hime: The Legend of Princess Sakura, which concluded in 2012. Following her announcement, Shueisha reprinted her short comics from 2001 to 2010 in the anthology Tanemura Arina: Ren'ai Monogatari-shū, which included a previously unpublished 6-page story.

Tanemura wrote and illustrated Neko to Watashi no Kinyōbi, which ran in Margaret from 2013 to 2015. At the same time, she also started serializing Idol Dreams in Hakusensha's Melody magazine. For the limited edition character song CD released with volume 3 of Idol Dreams, Tanemura wrote the lyrics to the song "Sakura-iro Time Trip." On March 23, 2013, Tanemura released her second album, Princess Tiara, on an independent record label, composed of theme songs performed by her based on her characters.

In 2015, Tanemura contributed character designs to the game and media project Idolish7. In addition, Tanemura provided illustrations to the novel and manga adaptations. She also contributed colored illustrations to the Touken Ranbu anthology, Touken Ranbu Gakuen. From 2015 to 2016, Tanemura briefly released dōjinshi as Meguro Teikoku. In October 2015, Tanemura collaborated with Yui Kikuta, one of her former assistants, to create the manga series Shunkan Lyle, which ran in Monthly Comic Zero Sum. From 2016 to 2017, she published the series Akuma ni Chic × Hack in Margaret. In 2019, to celebrate her 20th anniversary, Animate hosted a collaboration café from September 5 to 24 featuring food based on characters from her original series published with Shueisha. In 2025, Tanemura provided the CD jacket illustration to Yena's extended play Blooming Wings.

== Artistry and themes ==
Tanemura said she drew influences from shōjo manga from her childhood, particularly comedy stories such as Tokimeki Tonight and Chibi Maruko-chan, and she drew according to trends she believes were fashionable, resulting in her current art style. Tanemura stated that her art style is not derived from specific artists, and that she has been drawing in the same style since she was young, but has since then cited Hayao Miyazaki, Rumiko Takahashi, Kei Kusunoki, Yuu Watase, and Fumiko Tanikawa as people who have personally inspired her. In addition, Tanemura also cited Hideaki Anno as an influence, having watched his works during the second half of her "otaku phase". Tanemura intended to draw in a style that makes her works difficult to animate. While her earlier works had thicker and harsher lines, she described her artwork in 2017 as becoming more soft and flowy. Tanemura also primarily draws artwork without the use of digital tools and she illustrates using Dr. Ph. Martin coloring ink. The clothing featured in her works are inspired by clothing that she personally owns.

A common theme in Tanemura's shōjo manga works are female characters who transform back and forth between the young girls they are and the women they would like to become, and she drew Phantom Thief Jeanne, Full Moon o Sagashite and The Gentlemen's Alliance Cross specifically to exaggerate how girls want to become mature. Tanemura drew a reversal of this theme for Idol Dreams, where the main protagonist transforms into the young girl she had wanted to be, to appeal to fans who had grown up with her work.

The influence of idol singers is another theme present in Tanemura's works. Tanemura, a fan of Hello! Project groups such as Morning Musume and Berryz Kobo, had modeled the protagonist of Full Moon o Sagashite using then-Morning Musume member Ai Kago's corkscrew hairstyle. Idol Dreams is also centered on an idol singer, but Tanemura drew influences from older magical girl idol series like Creamy Mami and Fancy Lala. Tanemura stated that she is also a fan of Fudanjuku and actively follows their career; she is friends with the group's members and wrote the manga Fudanjuku Monogatari based on their stage personas.

Referring to Full Moon o Sagashite and The Gentlemen's Alliance Cross, Tanemura disclosed that her main female characters and their relationships are based on her friends or stories she has heard from them. She stated her stories were not meant to deliver a specific message to young women and that they were for everyone to enjoy. Her favorite of her works is The Gentlemen's Alliance Cross.

== Publications ==
=== Series ===
Year	Title	Magazine	Notes
1997	I.O.N; I-O-N (イ·オ·ン)	Ribon	
1998	Phantom Thief Jeanne; Kamikaze Kaitō Jannu (神風怪盗ジャンヌ)	Ribon	
2000	Time Stranger Kyoko; Taimu Sutorenjā Kyōko (時空異邦人KYOKO)	Ribon	
2002	Full Moon o Sagashite; Furu Mūn o Sagashite (満月を探して)	Ribon	
2004	The Gentlemen's Alliance Cross; Shinshi Dōmei Kurosu (紳士同盟クロス)	Ribon	
2008	Mistress Fortune; Zettai Kakusei Tenshi Misutoresu Fōchun (絶対覚醒天使ミストレス☆フォーチュン)	Ribon	
2008	Sakura Hime: The Legend of Princess Sakura; Sakura Hime Kaden (桜姫華伝)	Ribon	
2011	Fudanjuku Monogatari (風男塾物語)	Margaret	
2013	Neko to Watashi no Kinyōbi (猫と私の金曜日)	Margaret	
2013	Idol Dreams; 31 Aidorīmu (31☆アイドリーム)	Melody	
2015	Shunkan Lyle (瞬間ライル)	Monthly Comic Zero Sum	As writer
2016	Akuma ni Chic × Hack (悪魔にChic×Hack)	Margaret	
2016	Idolish7 Trigger: Before the Radiant Glory	LaLa DX	
2016	Idolish7: Mezzo: Murasaki Ao no Hekireki (アイドリッシュセブン MEZZO"-紫青の霹靂-)	LaLa DX	
2017	Idolish7: Good Morning, Laughter! (アイドリッシュセブン グッドモーニング、ラフター！/朝の寮にいる)	LaLa DX	One-shot
2017	Idolish7: Re:member	LaLa DX	
2017	Idolish7: Ryūsei o Inoru (アイドリッシュセブン 流星に祈る)	LaLa DX	
2020	Frozen II: The Manga	—N/a	

=== Anthologies ===
No.	Title	Original release date	English release date
1	Short-Tempered Melancholic and Other Short Stories; Kanshaku Dama no Yūutsu (かんしゃく玉のゆううつ)	May 15, 1998; 978-4088560809	August 5, 2008; 978-1421518015
1. Short-Tempered Melancholic (かんしゃく玉のゆううつ, Kanshaku Dama no Yūutsu); 2. Short-Tempered Melancholic: Without You (かんしゃく玉のゆううつ〜君がいなくちゃ〜, Kanshaku Dama no Yūutsu: Kimi ga Inakucha); 3. This Love is Nonfiction (この恋はNONフィクション, Kono Koi wa Non Fikushon); 4. Rainy Days Are for Romantic Heroines (雨の午後はロマンスのヒロイン, Ame no Gogo wa Romansu no Hiroin); 5. The Style of the Second Love (2番目の恋のかたち, Ni-banme no Koi no Katachi)
The anthology features all of Tanemura's one-shot comics from 1996 to 1998.
2	Tanemura Arina: Ren'ai Monogatari-shū (種村有菜 恋愛物語集)	December 18, 2012; 978-4086193856	—
1. Gin-yu Meika (吟遊名華); 2. Shojo Eve: Eve's Applework 24 Hours (少女イブ☆林檎じかけの24時, Shōjo Ibu Ringo Jikake no Nijūyon-ji); 3. The Globe of the Sea: Nocturne (海の地球儀・夜想曲, Umi no Chikyūgi Nokutān); 4. White Rose Academy: Vampire Rose (白薔薇学園ヴァンパイア・ローズ, Shirobara Gakuen Vanpaia Rōzu); 5. The Angelic Gold Coin of Maple Rose (天使の金貨 メイプルローズ, Tenshi no Kinka Meipuru Rōzu)
The anthology features all of Tanemura's one-shot comics from 2001 to 2010, described as "love stories told from a mystery or fantasy perspective.": Gin-yu Meika was serialized in the November 2001 issue of Ribon and published in volume 2 of Full Moon o Sagashite.; Shojo Eve: Eve's Applework 24 Hours was serialized in the 2007 Spring Chō Bikkuri Daizōkan edition of Ribon. An English version was serialized in the August 2007 issue of Shojo Beat. It was published in volume 8 of The Gentlemen's Alliance Cross.; The Globe of the Sea: Nocturne was serialized in the 2007 Fall Chō Bikkuri Daizōkan edition of Ribon and published in volume 11 of The Gentlemen's Alliance Cross.; White Rose Academy: Vampire Rose was serialized in the 2009 Fantasy Zōkan edition of Ribon and published in volume 5 of Sakura Hime: The Legend of Princess Sakura.; The Angelic Gold Coin of Maple Rose was serialized in the 2010 Spring Chō Bikkuri Daizōkan edition of Ribon Special and in volume 6 of Sakura Hime: The Legend of Princess Sakura.

=== Artbooks ===
No.	Title	Original release date	English release date
1	Tanemura Arina Irasuto Shū Kamikaze Kaitō Jannu (神風怪盗ジャンヌ 種村有菜イラスト集)	July 5, 2000; 4-08-855097-8	—
2	The Arina Tanemura Collection: The Art of Full Moon; Tanemura Arina Collection: Furu Mūn o Sagashite (種村有菜COLLECTION 満月をさがして)	April 15, 2004; 4-08-855106-0	October 21, 2008; 978-1-4215-1885-5
3	The Gentlemen's Alliance Cross: Arina Tanemura Illustrations; Shinshi Dōmei Kurosu Tanemura Arina Irasuto Shū (紳士同盟† 種村有菜イラスト集)	June 13, 2008; 978-4-08-782172-7	November 7, 2009; 978-1-4215-2933-2
4	Paint Ribon Art of Tanemura Arina (PAINTりぼん art of 種村有菜)	April 24, 2009; 978-4-08-908102-0	—
5	Irasuto Meikingu Bukku Tanemura Arina Karaīngu (イラストメイキングブック 種村有菜 カラーインク)	September 13, 2019; 978-4835456966	—
6	Alice Closet Illustrated Book: Anata to Alice no Unmei no Kizuna (Alice Closet Illustrated Book あなたとアリスの運命の絆)	August 26, 2020; 978-4845635276	—

=== Comic essays ===
No.	Title	Japanese release date	Japanese ISBN
1	Arina no Tane (有菜の種)	January 13, 2012	978-4088671703
2	Arina no Tane: Mattari Nichijō-hen (有菜の種 ~まったり日常編~)	November 25, 2016	978-4088674391

=== Illustrations ===
Year	Title	Notes
2010	Chinami ni Tribute	Anthology; as contributing artist
2013	Phantom Thief Jeanne	Light novel adaptation
2015	Idolish7 the Novel: Ryūsei ni Inoru	
2015	Touken Ranbu: Touken Ranbu Online Anthology Comic	Anthology; as contributing artist
2018	Idolish7 the Novel: Ainana Gakuen	
2018	Himitsu no Himegimi wa Jaja Uma ni Tsuki	
2018	Idolish7 the Novel: Re:member	

== Other works ==
=== Voice acting credits ===
Year	Title	Role	Notes
2004	The Gentlemen's Alliance Cross	Maora Ichinomiya, Postman	Drama CD

=== Radio programs ===
Year	Title	Network	Role	Notes
2008–2009	Tanemura Arina Radio de Kyan: Manga Seminar	Niconico Douga	Host	

=== Character design ===
Year	Title	Notes
2015	Idolish7	
2018	Alice Closet	
2019	Tokyo Cinderella Story	Design for Virtual YouTubers Mirei Natsukawa and Yuno Fujimiya

=== Non-publication illustrations ===
Year	Title	Notes
2019	Yuki no Hana	Visual artwork
2019	Hataraku Watashi no Kami Jijō (働くワタシの髪事情)	Short comic in commercial for Shiseido's Tsubaki hair products
2020	Koi to Mahō to Choco no Aji (恋と魔法とチョコの味)	Short comic for Meiji's Sunny Milk Chocolate

== Discography ==
=== Studio albums ===
Title	Year	Peak chart positions		Sales
Title	Year	JPN Oricon	JPN Hot	Sales
Jun'ai Tenshi (純愛天使)	Released: December 29, 2010; Label: —; Format: CD; Track listing: 1. "Sakura Hime Kaden" (桜姫華伝) (Theme song for Sakura Hime: The Legend of Princess Sakura); 2. "Yamato Nadeshiko Hana Henge" (大和撫子華変化) (Theme song for Short-Tempered Melancholic); 3. "Jun'ai Fortune" (純愛☆フォーチュン) (Theme song for Mistress Fortune); 4. "Tokei no Shiro no Nemuri-hime" (時計の城の眠り姫) (Theme song for Time Stranger Kyoko); 5. "Ame no Gogo wa Romance no Heroine" (雨の午後はロマンスのヒロイン) (Theme song for Rainy Days Are For Romantic Heroines); 6. "Sakana no Gin'iro Eigakan" (魚の銀色映画館) (Theme song for This Love is Nonfiction); 7. "San-byō no Kiseki" (3秒の奇跡) (Theme song for I.O.N); 8. "Kindan Cross Game" (禁断CROSS GAME) (Theme song for The Gentlemen's Alliance Cross); 9. "Gyakkō no Mademoiselle" (逆光のマドモアゼル) (Theme song for Phantom Thief Jeanne); 10. "Full Moon o Sagashite" (満月をさがして) (Theme song for Full Moon o Sagashite)	—	—	—
Princess Tiara	Released: March 3, 2013; Label: Treasure of Music; Format: CD; Track listing: 1. "Neko to Watashi no Kinyōbi" (猫と私の金曜日) (Theme song for Neko to Watashi no Kinyōbi); 2. "Scorpion" (Image song for Kyoko Suomi from Time Stranger Kyoko); 3. "Bara-iro Romance" (薔薇色ロマンス) (Image song for Maron Kusakabe from Phantom Thief Jeanne); 4. "Chu tto Mero-tic" (CHUっとメロティック) (Image song for Meroko from Full Moon o Sagashite); 5. "Glass no Yakusoku" (硝子の約束) (Image song for Haine Otomiya The Gentlemen's Alliance Cross); 6. "Tatoe Ningyo nara" (たとえ人魚なら) (Image song for Rurijo from Sakura Hime: The Legend of Princess Sakura); 7. "Jun'ai Fortune" (純愛☆フォーチュン) (Theme song for Mistress Fortune); 8. "Shōjo Jun'ai Hakusho" (少女純愛白書) (Image song for Ushio Amamiya The Gentlemen's Alliance Cross); 9. "Ame no Gogo wa Romance no Heroine" (雨の午後はロマンスのヒロイン) (Theme song for Rainy Days Are For Romantic Heroines); 10. "Otome no Tane" (乙女の種) (Theme song for Arina no Tane)	—	—	—
"—" denotes releases that did not chart or were not released in that region.

=== Soundtrack appearances ===
Title	Year	Peak chart positions	Sales	Album
Title	Year	JPN	Sales	Album
"Smile (Arina's Vocal Version)"	2005	—	—	Full Moon o Sagashite: Full Moon Final Live
"—" denotes releases that did not chart or were not released in that region.
