= Short-Tempered Melancholic =

Japanese manga anthology

かんしゃく玉のゆううつ (Kanshakudama no Yūutsu)
- Genre: Romance
- Manga
- Written by: Arina Tanemura
- Published by: Shueisha
- English publisher: NA: Viz Media
- Magazine: Ribon
- Published: May 15, 1998
- Volumes: 1

Short-Tempered Melancholic and Other Short Stories (かんしゃく玉のゆううつ, Kanshakudama no Yūutsu) is a Japanese shōjo manga anthology written and illustrated by Arina Tanemura. Originally serialized in Ribon, the five short stories were collected and published in a single tankōbon volume by Shueisha in May 1998. It was published by Viz Media in English in North America on August 5, 2008.

== Contents ==
"Short-Tempered Melancholic" (かんしゃく玉のゆううつ, Kanshakudama no Yūutsu)
Kajika Yamano is a female ninja whose job is to protect her family's legendary weapon. But when a boy she has a crush on tells her she should be more ladylike, she vows to give up all ninja deeds. The oneshot was Tanemura's third work, and takes its title from a song by the Japanese pop group Fairchild.
"Short-Tempered Melancholic -Without You-"
Yuga challenges Hayato to a fight over Kajika.
"Rainy Days Are for Romantic Heroines" (Ame no Gogo wa Romance no Heroine)
Minori falls in love with Takato, a boy who shared his umbrella with her one rainy afternoon. Now she "forgets" her umbrella every time it rains in hopes of becoming closer to him. The oneshot was Tanemura's second work after her professional debut, named after an album by Shinichi Ishihara.
"This Love is Nonfiction" (Kono Koi wa Non-Fiction)
Yuri sends her pen pal Ryo a picture of herself - but it's really of her best friend Karin, who is prettier than she is. Now Ryo wants to meet her, so she has no choice but to send Karin instead! Tanemura's fourth work after her debut as a mangaka, this story was the opening manga in an extra issue of Ribon, and the first of her works to be published with a color opening page.
"The Style of the Second Love" (Niban-me no Koi no Katachi)
Mana secretly likes her friend's boyfriend, but Nakamura, a younger boy, is determined to win Mana's heart.

== Media ==
=== Manga ===
No.	Title	Original release date	English release date
1	Short-Tempered Melancholic and Other Short Stories; Kanshaku Dama no Yūutsu (かんしゃく玉のゆううつ)	May 15, 1998; 978-4088560809	August 5, 2008; 978-1421518015
1. Short-Tempered Melancholic (かんしゃく玉のゆううつ, Kanshaku Dama no Yūutsu); 2. Short-Tempered Melancholic: Without You (かんしゃく玉のゆううつ〜君がいなくちゃ〜, Kanshaku Dama no Yūutsu: Kimi ga Inakucha); 3. This Love is Nonfiction (この恋はNONフィクション, Kono Koi wa Non Fikushon); 4. Rainy Days Are for Romantic Heroines (雨の午後はロマンスのヒロイン, Ame no Gogo wa Romansu no Hiroin); 5. The Style of the Second Love (2番目の恋のかたち, Ni-banme no Koi no Katachi)

== Reception ==
In its daily reviews, Publishers Weekly praised the pacing and layouts of the work, but criticized Tanemura's continued reuse of character designs across series and Kajika's relatively small role within the story, noting that "despite the ninja on the cover, the bulk of the book is straightup romance, which is too bad, as Kajika is an appealing protagonist." Leroy Douresseaux of Comic Book Bin felt the story showed Tanemura's "usual ornate art with its layered flower patterns, toning, and ink wash" and found the stories to be "the kind of gentle and sweet, light-hearted romance that appeal [sic] to Tanemura's fans."
