= Time Stranger Kyoko =

Manga

- Cover of Japanese volume 1

時空異邦人KYOKO (Taimu Sutorenjā Kyōko)
- Genre: Fantasy, romance
- Manga
- Written by: Arina Tanemura
- Published by: Shueisha
- English publisher: NA: Viz Media
- Imprint: Ribon Mascot Comics
- Magazine: Ribon
- Original run: September 2000 – September 2001
- Volumes: 3
- Original video animation
- Directed by: Masatsugu Arakawa
- Written by: Fumihiko Shimo
- Studio: Trans Arts
- Released: August 2, 2001
- Runtime: 11 minutes

Time Stranger Kyoko (Japanese: 時空異邦人KYOKO(タイムストレンジャーキョーコ), Hepburn: Taimu Sutorenjā Kyōko) is a manga series written and illustrated by Arina Tanemura. Originally serialized in Ribon from the September 2000 issue to the September 2001 issue, the individual chapters were collected and published in three tankōbon volumes in Japan by Shueisha. Viz Media licensed the series for English-language publication in North America, publishing the first volume in July 2008; the third and final volume was published in January 2009.

An eleven-minute-long original video animation (OVA) based on the manga series, Time Stranger Kyoko: Leave it to Chocola, was released in Japan in 2001 at Shueisha's Ribon Festival. Produced by Transarts and directed by Masatsugu Arakawa, the OVA centers on the character Chocola.

== Plot ==
In the 30th Century, the planet is now united under one country called Earth. Princess Kyoko Suomi is protected by the last remaining members of the Dragon clan: the princes Hizuki and his younger brother Sakataki. Kyoko has lived the life of a commoner, attending public school under the quiet protection of her two guardians, while avoiding being seen in public as the princess. As her 16th birthday approaches, the time when she will inherit the crown, her subjects are growing restless at her refusal to be seen. She decides to accept her fate and her duties as the princess, but her father offers her the chance to return to the life she prefers if she can awaken her twin sister, Ui. Ui has been in a coma-like state since she was born and is said to be "trapped in time". If she awakens, she would inherit the crown, and Kyoko would be free. Wanting to meet and speak with the sister she has never known, Kyoko agrees to undertake the quest.

To do this, Kyoko must find the Strangers, twelve telepaths who each hold a holy stone that enables their owners to use specific powers. They must use their powers to operate a giant clock to awaken Ui. When a trouble-making gang comes to the school having heard a tip that the princess was there, and begins harassing Kyoko's friend Karen, Kyoko reveals her identity to protect both her friend and the school. Her nobility in this situation causes the first holy stone to make Kyoko herself the first telepath, the Time Stranger, and the one destined to lead the others. She has the power to stop time and go back in time, and is given the "Scorpion Cane" which talks to her, allows her to wield her powers and aids Strangers. Her guardian Sakataki is revealed to be the Crystal Stranger, and they are able to quickly find the next ten strangers, all leaders of their clans and descendants of the Kirit clan. They are able to find the ten of the remaining strangers quickly, and along the way Kyoko comes to appreciate her position as a princess and decides she will continue to be one even after Ui awakens.

As the story progresses, Kyoko and Sakataki fall in love, though they do not reveal their feelings to one another. Kyoko plans to confess when the final stranger is found, but one night Hizuki kisses her in her sleep and confesses his own love for her. He is quickly arrested as his actions are taken as an attack on the princess. With Hizuki sentenced to death, to save his life Kyoko chooses him to be her husband and tells him that she loves him. He reveals to Sakataki that he did it on purpose to become her husband and that he is a demon named Kirit and the one who destroyed the Dragon Clan. He gives Sakataki the only sword capable of killing him, then forces him into a duel wanting to die, but Kyoko stops it and yells at him. Sakataki also tells him he knew what Hizuki had done as a child, and that he still loved him. Satisfied, Hizuki reveals himself to be the last Stranger.

The ceremony is performed to awaken Ui, but her body vanishes and she awakens in Kyoko's body. Kyoko awakens in another world where she meets Chronos, the god of time and her true father. He explains that as a child, Kyoko needed a human body to mature in quickly as he was dying, and the king agreed to allow him to use Ui's body. In performing the ceremony, Kyoko returned Ui to her own body and Kyoko returned to being a god. She was forgotten by everyone, except the King, who cried at losing her. Kyoko accepts being this and agrees to fulfill her duties, but she cannot forget Sakataki and runs to where he is and confesses her love to him, though he cannot see or hear her. She kisses him goodbye, and he briefly sees her before she goes. He finds a water strain in his pocket with a picture and note from her, which unlocks his memories. He runs to the clock to find her, but it was destroyed after Kyoko and Chronos returned to their own world. He gathers the other Strangers and helps them remember. They use their powers to open a rip in time, allowing Sakataki to go to where Kyoko is.

Realizing how much they love one another, Chronos allows Kyoko to return to the human world after absorbing some of her powers to enable himself to continue ruling. The king gives Kyoko the body of his late wife Kiku, who died giving birth to Ui and for whom Chronos had stopped time. She marries Sakataki and continues to live as a princess and as a sister to Ui.

== Media ==
=== Manga ===
Time Stranger Kyoko is written and illustrated by Arina Tanemura. It was serialized in the monthly magazine Ribon from the September 2000 issue to the September 2001 issue. The chapters were later released in 3 bound volumes by Shueisha under the Ribon Mascot Comics imprint. In January 2008, Viz Media acquired licensing rights to publish the manga in English for North American distribution under their Shojo Beat imprint.

In 2012, Tanemura stated that Time Stranger Kyoko was unpopular with her editor and the protagonist, Kyoko, had a personality that was "too strong" for her reader demographic. Her editor requested her to end the manga early, explaining the story's rushed conclusion, and she mentioned in 2018 that she would like to redo the story if given a chance.

==== Tankōbon editions ====
No.	Original release date	Original ISBN	English release date	English ISBN
1	March 15, 2001	978-4-08-856265-0	July 1, 2008	978-1-4215-1797-1
2	July 3, 2001	978-4-08-856296-4	October 7, 2008	978-1-4215-1798-8
3	December 10, 2001	978-4-08-856333-6	January 6, 2009	978-1-4215-1799-5

==== Bunkoban editions ====
On September 18, 2014, Time Stranger Kyoko was re-released in bunkoban format with new illustrated covers.

No.	Japanese release date	Japanese ISBN
1	September 18, 2014	978-4-08-619509-6
2	September 18, 2014	978-4-08-619510-2

=== OVA ===
Time Stranger Kyoko received an original video animation adaptation titled Time Stranger Kyoko: Leave it to Chocola! (時空異邦人KYOKO ちょこらにおまかせ!) The OVA was screened as a short film at the 2001 Ribon Festival on August 2, 2001, as a double-feature with Good Morning Call. The OVA was produced by TransArts with direction by Masatsugu Arakawa.

== Reception ==
In the United States, Time Stranger Kyoko was listed at 48 on a list of the top 50 manga for summer 2008, which reflected sales for May, June, and the first half of July 2008. Publishers Weekly felt the plot and art were too busy saying, "the detailed costume designs are a mishmash of time periods, [there are] lots of screen tone[s], and speed lines fill every frame". While the series is rated by Viz for older teens, the reviewer felt it would appeal to young girls.
