= Sakura Hime: The Legend of Princess Sakura =

Shōjo manga series

- Volume one of the Japanese version, featuring Sakura

桜姫華伝 (Sakura Hime Kaden)
- Genre: Fantasy, romance
- Manga
- Written by: Arina Tanemura
- Published by: Shueisha
- English publisher: NA: Viz Media
- Imprint: Ribon Mascot Comics
- Magazine: Ribon
- Original run: December 1, 2008 – December 2012
- Volumes: 12

Sakura Hime: The Legend of Princess Sakura (Japanese: 桜姫華伝, Hepburn: Sakura Hime Kaden; lit. The Legend of Princess Sakura) is a shōjo manga series written and illustrated by Arina Tanemura. It began serialization in Ribon magazine on December 1, 2008, and has been compiled into 12 volumes by publisher Shueisha. The series is licensed for English language publication in North America by Viz Media under their Shojo Beat imprint. They published the first volume on April 5, 2011.

== Plot ==
The story follows Sakura, a 14-year-old princess who'd rather marry for love and make her own choices in life than be married away to someone she's never met. Her best friend is Asagiri, a cute female Mononoke (a tiny spirit) who she once saved from a life of slavery (unbeknownst to her, Asagiri is really a Yuki-Onna). Since birth, she's been engaged to Prince Oura. Not wanting to marry the prince after a precarious argument with Prince Oura's messenger, named Aoba, Sakura runs away but gets lost and accidentally looks at the full moon, which she was warned to never do. A man-eating demon arrives, referring to Sakura as "Princess Kaguya" and nearly wounds her, but Aoba and a priestess that Sakura knows named Byakuya arrive. Priestess Byakuya tells Sakura that she is in fact Princess Kaguya's granddaughter and is the only one able to destroy the demons. By drawing a pair of back-to-back crescent moons on her palm, she is able to summon the mystic sword Chizakura and kill the demon. She also discovers the word "destroy" is actually her Soul Symbol (a symbol each person possesses that best represents his or her true nature). Soon after, Sakura, Asagiri, and Aoba travel to Prince Oura's estate, where it's discovered that Aoba actually is Prince Oura, explaining that he wanted to be mischievous. Of course, the two don't get along from then on, until finally while relaxing under a tree, the two finally seem to come to an understanding, and do appear to be finding the silver lining in their arranged engagement. Unfortunately, she is soon under threat of execution, as Aoba turns on her, as he's afraid that she will eventually become a demon herself, like her mother and grandmother before her. Aoba shoots an arrow through her chest and Sakura falls into a river, only to be found by a cute and sassy young ninja named Kohaku and her childhood friend Hayate, who used to be human but was accidentally turned into a frog by Kohaku (although he regains his human form during the full moon). While with Kohaku, the two form a nice friendship, and Sakura reveals that she is being hunted by Kohaku's master, who just so happens to be Aoba. Kohaku though in return admits already knowing this, and tells that she doesn't wish to harm her, and wants to protect her. The two, along with Asagiri and Hayate, soon encounter Aoba and his men, and Volume 1 ends with Sakura being affected by a youko whistle that Aoba has.

In the next few volumes a new arc begins. Sakura meets her 'dead brother' Kai who turned evil to humans. His hatred to humans happens after the emperor throws him into the water chamber because of his fear of moon people (Sakura, Kai, Kagura). Sakura finds out that Kai, changed his name into Enju and he is gathering followers to destroy the humans. Enju's followers names are Maimai, Shuri, Rurijo, and Ukyo. Eventually they come to encounter Sakura and Aoba which then they take Sakura with them leaving Aoba devastated.

When they arrive to the moon Enju wants Sakura to dress in more of a 'Moon way' so he orders Maimai to cloth Sakura.

As the story progresses, Sakura wishes to find a way to help all her friends, as well as those who have had their lives twisted due to the rivalry of the demons against humankind, and to save Aoba and Asagiri from the curses which are killing them. That happens after Aoba and Sakura accepts each other.

== Characters ==
=== Moon Princess group ===
Sakura (桜)

The fourteen-year-old princess of the moon and the granddaughter of princess Kaguya. She lost her parents when she was very young so she lived with her brother, Kai, until he died after a visit to the capital. Ever since then, she has been under her fiancée Aoba/Prince Oura's care. She has an arranged marriage with Aoba. Sakura can wield Kaguya's sword, Chizakura, to kill youkos, otherwise known as demons. Sakura is supposed to be the only one that can control Chizakura, even though at first Chiazakura doesn't listen, but it slowly excepts her, Kaguya's granddaughter. When using her powers, her hair turns silver like the people of the moon. But most of the times, her hair is brown. She falls for Aoba, though she said she hated him at first. Soul Symbol: Destroy

Aoba/Prince Oura (青葉/王良親王)

The imperial prince of kingdom. He has been engaged to Sakura since he was three years old. He is very talented and is skilled in martial arts, horseback riding and calligraphy. He said that he has so many talents because he wants to be the perfect man for Sakura. He never visited Sakura when she was little but he has always been watching over her. He can use a spell to transform into a wolf, in reality that form is a result after an attack on his life with poison. When he now uses his wolf form, it bruises his body and takes some of his life span, eating it away each time. Soul Symbol: Life or Birth

Asagiri (朝霧)

A Yuki-Onna (Snow Woman from a famous Japanese legend) who drank the blood of a One-Inch Spirit. Asagiri used to live in a village where the sun never shines called Snowy Night Village before she was chosen to be sacrificed to the God that protects her village. Until the village is one day destroyed, and she finds herself tiny. She is in love with Ukyo, another snow spirit. After her village was gone she got captured by a man who would sell her and steal her back every time to make money. She was purchased by Sakura in exchange for her kimono. She can use her powers to return to full size and control snow at the cost of her life's energy, making her life twice shorter. Soul Symbol: Kindness

Byakuya (白夜)

A priestess from the moon. She shows the mysterious power to wield Chizakura when she fights Maimai, and turns into a beautiful young woman. In the last volume she says that she was the founder of the moon kingdom and disguises herself as an old woman to hide her silver hair.

Kohaku (琥珀)

A somewhat klutzy ninja but she showed great strength in being able to fight Shuri, who used to be her friend. She has feelings for Hayate, but can't tell him because she feels guilty for using jutsu to accidentally turn him into a frog. After the jutsu broke (thanks to Rurijo) she confesses to Hayate, but is rejected since he fell in love with Rurijo. This led to a massive shock.

Hayate (疾風)

Kohaku and Aoba's best friend. When they were young, Kohaku accidentally turned him into a frog with a jutsu. On the full moon he turns human for a day. He was in love with Kohaku, and kept anncouncing his feelings for her, but in volume 10, he realizes he has fallen in love with Rurijo after he (in his frog form) sees her bathing. They become good friends and Rurijo sprinkles moon water on him to make him permanently human.

Fujimurasaki (藤紫)

Aoba's uncle and the next in line for the throne, due to a prophecy saying Aoba will fall for a princess of the moon, which will cause disaster. He and Aoba do not get along and it is hinted that he has feelings for Sakura. In order to help Aoba and Sakura when Princess Yuri has tried to seduce Aoba, he offers a marriage alliance to Princess Yuri, but she chooses to leave him before the wedding. Soul Symbol: Greed

Rurijo (瑠璃条)

A doll Enju made to look just like Sakura; Enju made her out of leaves and branches of an Elm tree and a laptis lazuli stone, which became her core. She despises Sakura because Enju chose Sakura over her, and has taken Sakura's place on more than one occasion. In volume 10, it is shown that she developed feelings for Hayate and sprinkles him with moon water to break his curse. After Enju discover her "friendship" with Hayate he abandoned her. The platonic feelings she has for him bloosoms into romantic ones, once she finds out Hayate's love for her. Rurijo tries to kill Sakura but ends up becoming her friend, and Sakura becoming the "master" of her, because Sakura took her in, even after multiple of Rurijo's assassination attempt toward her. Even with Hayate being one of her love interest, she states that she cannot forget Enju. But Sakura being her new master, she decides to try to kill him.

=== The Moon People/ Youko ===
Enju or Kai (槐/戒)

He was revealed to be Sakura's older brother, originally named Kai, and is also immortal. He hates humans for two reasons: 1) He thinks they are trying to control Sakura 2) the emperor put him in a water chamber to drown him over and over again, which eventually did drive him to what is described as insanity. Due to his hatred, he abandons his human side. Has a blue stone in his head from drinking the moon spring water which makes one a youko, and possesses the power to control water. HE kidnaps Sakura asking her to save the moon people, but he catually tries to revive Kaguya. Tries to use Sakura to kill Aoba. He later steals Sakura and Aoba's soul symbol.

Shuri (朱里)

A ninja from the Ninja village, childhood friends with Kohaku, Hayate, and Aoba. He and his brother; Hato was told by the emperor to desert the village and pledge alliance to the moon people, namely Enju, and report back to the leader of the ninja village. He took the mission knowing that he would never be able to return to the village. Hato committed suicide to make it easier for the moon people to approach Shuri. The village believes that Shuri killed his own brother. He also drank the moon spring water making him immortal in have youko powers. He is in love with Kohaku.

Ukyo (右京)

One of Enju's allies before Enju killed him becausde he betrayed him and went for Asagiri. He also drank the moon spring water. It was shown that he was Asagiri's lover, who allied himself with Enju solely in the hopes of finding Asagiri again. He fell in love with her after she "accidentally" kissed him. Ukyo gave her a moonstone bracelet that he made as a token of forgiveness. Later, Asagiri gets mad at him because he also gave one to Lady Shimoni and gives the bracelet back to Ukyo saying she don't want it. He asks her why she hates him so much and she admits that she loves him and but doesn't like that he was kind to every else. He then kisses her and promises to give Asagiri a moonstone necklace for their wedding, and that he will only be kind to her by then on. Even when he finds out Asagiri burning down their village, he continues to love her. Before he gets killed by Enju, he presents her with the necklace. Being a snow spirit like Asagiri, he also had the power of snow. Soul Symbol: Purity.

Maimai (舞々)

One of Enju's allies. He also drank the moon spring water. He dresses up as a girl. It was shown that when he was young, he had tragic scars from an accident and that his fellow villagers thought of him as repulsive. One girl, Mai, the most beautiful girl in the village, befriended him because she thought he was pitiful. After Maimai became beautiful from the spring water, he murdered everyone from his village and killed Mai because he felt ugly in her presence. He is Princess Yuri (Lily)'s younger twin brother and has the same soul symbol as she has (Soul Symbol: Beauty). Similarly to Maora from The Gentlemen's Alliance Cross, his physical appearance is drastically different dressing as a girl: he somehow has a girly round eye shape and a delicate feminine neck and seems rather skinny when dressed as a girl unlike his masculine appearance when dressed as a guy.

=== Others ===
Oumi (淡海)

She was Sakura's extremely strict lady in waiting, but also her most precious one. Oumi starts to dislike Sakura after finding out her identity. But she later on learns to trust Sakura again. She was turned into a youko by Enju and was killed by Sakura. After, in volume 7, she helps Sakura escape Chizakura when she was controlled by Enju. Soul Symbol: Trust

The Emperor

He was the one who ordered that Enju be imprisoned in a water chamber. He eventually imprisons Sakura in the same kind of water chamber, although she is quickly rescued by Enju, who kills him.

Princess Yuri (百合)

Young daughter of the Minister of the Right, the first noble friend/rival of Sakura. She was Aoba's "concubine" and next Fujimurasaki fiancée. In reality she is Maimai's lost twin sister, Lily. The real princess Yuri died when she was three years old, and her mother ordered her servant, Akane, to find a girl who could take Yuri's place. Lily agreed, due to her hopes to secure a good life so she could take care of her brother. Sakura discovers that the two had met after Princess Yuri/Lily admits to the charade, but when Maimai and Princess Yuri argue about who is most beautiful, they both reveal their soul symbols, which are the same. This makes them realize who they are to each other, and they escape together from the capital to begin a new life together. Soul Symbol: Beauty

Hato

Shuri's older brother that was also a ninja. Revealed that he went on the mission with Shuri, and ended up killing himself to make it look like Shuri did it so that Shuri would gain Enju's trust.

== Background ==
On November 11, 2011, during the manga's serialisation, Tanemura announced that she was no longer contractually bound to only draw manga for Ribon, but reassured fans that Sakura Hime would continue to appear in the magazine until the story was complete. In volume 6 of the manga, Tanemura stated, "Actually, I'm not even a quarter of the way into the whole series yet. I often get questions asking me how long the series will run for. It looks like we've still got quite a long way to go." Tanemura later ended the series at 12 volumes.

== Media ==
=== Manga ===
Sakura Hime: The Legend of Princess Sakura premiered in the January 2009 issue of Ribon. The individual chapters were collected and published in tankōbon volumes by Shueisha. The series is licensed for English language publication in North America by Viz Media, who published the first volume on April 5, 2011. It is licensed for regional publication in Italy by Panini Comics, Taiwan by Sharp Point Press, and Germany by Tokyopop Germany.

==== Chapter List ====
No.	Original release date	Original ISBN	English release date	English ISBN
1	March 13, 2009	978-4-08-856873-7	April 5, 2011	1-4215-3882-2
01 Under the Moon; 02 Betrothed Since Birth; 03 Kohaku Appears! Humans and Those Who Aren't
2	July 15, 2009	978-4-08-856898-0	June 7, 2011	1-4215-3883-0
04 An Ephemeral Bond Still; 05 But You'll Get Angry if I Tell You; 06 Why Did You Choose Me?; 07 Standing At The Entrance To an Ephemeral Labyrinth
3	November 13, 2009	978-4-08-867021-8	August 2, 2011	1-4215-3884-9
08 All Living Things; 09 To the One Who Loves Spring; 10 The Day I Fell in Love for the First Time; 11 Please Don't Hurt My Big Brother
4	April 15, 2010	978-4-08-867047-8	October 4, 2011	1-4215-3885-7
12 The Other Princess Sakura; 13 Loving Without Being Loved; 14 A Passionate Heart; 15 Things that are not Beautiful Should Cease to Exist
5	July 15, 2010	978-4-08-867063-8	December 6, 2011	1-4215-3936-5
16 The Sword of Princess Kaguya, the Sword of Princess Sakura; 17 The Tale of Kohaku the Ninja; 18 I'll be fine
6	August 12, 2010	978-4-08-867070-6	February 7, 2012	1-4215-4024-X
19 Shuri's Path, Kohaku's Path, Hayate's Path; 20 A snow Firefly Love Story; 21 A Dark, Fiery Princess as White as Snow
7	December 15, 2010	978-4-08-867089-8	April 3, 2012	1-4215-4112-2
22 I Promised; 23 You Were the One for Me; 24 A Woman Without Nails; 25 The Love I Didn't Want to Requite
8	April 15, 2011	978-4-08-867116-1	June 5, 2012	1-4215-4178-5
26 In Search of You Inside a Void; 27 Light, Lily-Coloured Excitement; 28 I Believe You, But; 29 The "Greedy" Togu
9	January 13, 2012	978-4-08-867169-7	December 4, 2012	1-4215-4276-5
30 The Times I'm Happy; 31 Aoba's Secret; 32 Ephemeral Green Leaf; 33 The Tale of the Rose and the Frog; 34 Shared Secret: You're the Only One I Love
10	February 15, 2012	978-4-08-867174-1	June 4, 2013	1-4215-5137-3
35 Friendship and Naivete; 36 Believing Is a Sin, and Betrayal Shall Face Punishment; 37 Beauty Is a Sin; 38 I Too Was Guided by Fate; 39 Dancing Like a Lily
11	August 10, 2012	978-4-08-867214-4	October 1, 2013	1-4215-5373-2
40 Similar but Not the Same; 41 I Cannot Live Without You; 42 Fall in Love, Girls, Fall in Love with the Flower of Light; 43 The Snow Always Waits for Spring; 44 Farewell, My Little Friend
12	January 15, 2013	978-4-08-867244-1	February 4, 2014	1-4215-5916-1
45 Rurijo; 46 I Wanted to Protect You; 47 Moon Princess Sakura; 48 The Light Pink Petals; 49 If You Are Going to Be All Alone; 50 Goodbye and Thank You (Final Chapter)

=== Vomic ===
The series has been adapted into two vomics ("voice comics") by publisher Shueisha, the first starring voice actresses Eri Sendai and Atsuko Enomoto, which was released on the internet and on a DVD given as furoku with the November 2010 issue of Ribon magazine. The second is based on a side story about character Asagiri.

== Reception ==
The series frequently sells well enough to chart on different sales charts. In Japan, the first volume sold 41,125 copies in its first week of publication, ranking 15th in the Japanese Comic Rankings; in its second week it sold an additional 49,923 copies, falling to 27th place. The second volume sold 58,509 copies in its first week, ranking 7th. The third volume sold 36,624 copies in its first week ranking 11th and 35,318 copies in its second week, falling to 30th place. The fourth volume sold 51,007 copies in its first week of publication, ranking 13th place. The fifth volume ranked 10th with 50,543 copies sold in its first week and 23rd place with 31,697 copies in its second week. In its first week, the sixth volume sold 53,883 copies, ranking 16th place, but fell to 28th place with 32,736 copies sold in its second week. The seventh volume of the manga sold 58,316 copies in its first week, ranking 12th before falling out of the rankings. The eighth volume sold 37,652 copies in its first week of publication, ranking 18th, falling to 28th place with 35,289 copies in its second week of publication.

The first volume of Viz Media's English edition has sold well enough to rank on the New York Times Manga Best Seller List. The first volume was in 7th place in its first week of publication, fell to 10th place in the second, and stayed in 10th place for another week. Reviews of the first volume of the English version were generally positive. Leroy Douresseaux of the Comic Book Bin gave the volume an A−, suggesting that fans of Tanemura were sure to like the series, but that it's darker than many of her other works. Holly Ellingwood of Active Anime calls the volume "enthralling", also noting the darker tone of the work.
