= Neko to Watashi no Kinyōbi =

Japanese manga series

- Cover of the Japanese version of vol. 1, first released on June 25, 2013

猫と私の金曜日 (Neko to Watashi no Kinyōbi)
- Manga
- Written by: Arina Tanemura
- Published by: Shueisha
- Imprint: Margaret Comics
- Magazine: Margaret
- Original run: February 5, 2013 – November 20, 2015
- Volumes: 11

Neko to Watashi no Kinyōbi (Japanese: 猫と私の金曜日; lit. "Fridays with a Cat") is a Japanese manga written and illustrated by Arina Tanemura. Neko to Watashi no Kinyōbi was serialized in the monthly shōjo manga magazine Margaret from 2013 to 2015.

== Plot ==
Ai Tachibana is a high school student who is excited to visit the library every Friday just to see Mia Serizawa, an upperclassmen she is in love with. One day, she is asked to tutor her 5th grade cousin, Nekota Honjo. Nekota startles Ai by confessing that he is in love with her. While Ai dismisses him at first, she slowly begins to see him differently.

== Characters ==
Ai Tachibana (立花 愛, Tachibana Ai)
Voiced by: Megumi Nakajima
Ai is a first year high school student who loves chocolate. Indecisive and unconfident, she is in love with Serizawa at the start of the story, but she slowly finds herself becoming attracted to Nekota after he persistently pursues her.
Nekota Honjo (本条 猫太, Honjō Nekota)
Voiced by: Yūki Kaji
Nekota is Ai's 11-year-old cousin who is in the 5th grade. He has been in love with Ai ever since she helped him when he collapsed a year ago and struggles for her to take him seriously as a love interest.
Mia Serizawa (芹沢 未亜, Serizawa Mia)
Voiced by: Kazuyuki Okitsu
Serizawa is a third year high school student who works with the library committee. He is friendly and is popular with his classmates, but unbeknownst to them, he is the illegitimate son of the actress Ran Selena, and because of this, he wants to have a normal life. Initially, he is in love with Ai because of her normalcy, but after noticing she is falling in love with Nekota, he suggests they break up. Afterwards, he begins dating Mosko when he realizes she is in love with him. Near the end of the series, Serizawa debuts in the idol boy band Valentine, who also appears in Idol Dreams.
Mosko (モス子, Mosuko)
Voiced by: Risa Taneda
Mosko is Ai's best friend. Her real name is Midori Setouchi (瀬戸内美鳥), but she is nicknamed "Mosko" because she loves eating at MOS Burger. Mosko is uncomfortable around boys after being bullied over her weight as a child, but she soon falls in love with Serizawa and begins dating him after he and Ai break up.
Mikami Sugimoto (杉本 三神, Sugimoto Mikami)
Voiced by: Takahiro Sakurai
Nicknamed Mike (ミケ), he is Ai's childhood friend a year her senior and a genius pianist from Germany.
Kanade Maido (舞堂 奏, Maidō Kanade)
Voiced by: Kengo Kawanishi
Kanade is Nekota's classmate and one of five siblings in his family. His older brother is Hibiki Maido from Idol Dreams.
Ren Tachibana (立花 恋, Tachibana Ren)
Voiced by: Momo Asakura
Ren is Ai's little sister.

== Media ==
=== Manga ===
Neko to Watashi no Kinyōbi is written and illustrated by Arina Tanemura. It was serialized in the monthly shōjo manga magazine Margaret from February 5, 2013 to November 20, 2015. The chapters were later released in 11 bound volumes by Shueisha under the Margaret Comics imprint.

A drama CD adaptation was released with the limited edition of volume 8. A second drama CD was released as a magazine gift in the February 2015 issue of Margaret.

No.	Japanese release date	Japanese ISBN
1	June 25, 2013	978-4-08-845056-8
2	September 25, 2013	978-4-08-845098-8
3	December 25, 2013	978-4-08-845141-1
4	March 25, 2014	978-4-08-845179-4
5	June 25, 2014	978-4-08-845225-8
6	September 25, 2014	978-4-08-845262-3
7	December 25, 2014	978-4-08-845315-6
8	March 25, 2015	978-4-08-867429-2 (regular edition); 978-4-08-908229-4 (limited edition drama CD bundle)
9	June 25, 2015	978-4-08-845397-2
10	September 25, 2015	978-4-08-845442-9
11	December 25, 2015	978-4-08-845494-8

== Reception ==
Volume 1 debuted at #15 on Oricon and sold 48,246 copies in its first week. Volume 2 debuted at #13 on Oricon and sold 47,987 copies in its first week, with 68,313 copies sold overall. Volume 3 debuted at #28 on Oricon and sold 47,427 copies in its first week. Volume 4 debuted at #14 on Oricon and sold 57,668 copies in its first week. Volume 5 debuted at #17 on Oricon and sold 51,135 copies in its first week, with 71,666 copies sold overall. Volume 6 debuted at #18 on Oricon and sold 45,611 copies in its first week, with 67,604 copies sold overall. Volume 7 debuted at #34 on Oricon and sold 45,871 copies in its first week. Volume 9 debuted at #26 on Oricon and sold 39,272 copies in its first week.

Kono Manga ga Sugoi! listed Nekota's confession to Ai as #1 in their top 10 list of Most Desired Love Confessions in 2015. Shigemi Fujisaki from Kono Manga ga Sugoi! reviewed volume 6 favorably, saying it was full of ideal love scenarios for high school girls.
