= Phantom Thief Jeanne =

Manga and television anime

- Cover of the first tankōbon volume of Phantom Thief Jeanne.

神風怪盗ジャンヌ (Kamikaze Kaitō Jannu)
- Genre: Magical girl
- Manga
- Written by: Arina Tanemura
- Published by: Shueisha
- English publisher: NA: CMX (formerly) Viz Media
- Imprint: Ribon Mascot Comics
- Magazine: Ribon
- Original run: February 1998 – July 2000
- Volumes: 7
- Anime television series

Jeanne, The Kamikaze Thief
- Directed by: Atsutoshi Umezawa
- Produced by: Iriya Azuma; Kouichi Shitsuden; Megumi Ueda; Taro Iwamoto; Yumi Shimizu
- Written by: Sukehiro Tomita
- Music by: Michiaki Kato
- Studio: Toei Animation
- Original network: ANN (TV Asahi)
- Original run: February 13, 1999 – January 29, 2000
- Episodes: 44

Phantom Thief Jeanne (Japanese: 神風怪盗ジャンヌ, Hepburn: Kamikaze Kaitō Jannu; lit. "Divine Wind Phantom Thief Jeanne"; originally released as Kamikaze Kaito Jeanne in English) is a Japanese manga series written and illustrated by Arina Tanemura. The story is about the adventures of a high school girl, Maron Kusakabe, who is the reincarnation of Joan of Arc (Jeanne d'Arc) and transforms into a phantom thief magical girl to collect the scattered pieces of God's power, which are also coveted by demons hiding in beautiful artwork.

The manga was published by Shueisha in Ribon between February 1998 and July 2000. The individual chapters were collected and published in seven tankōbon volumes. It was formerly licensed for English-language publication by CMX and is now licensed by Viz Media. The series was adapted by Toei Animation as a 44-episode anime television series titled in English as Jeanne, The Kamikaze Thief that was broadcast on TV Asahi from February 1999 to January 2000. The manga was reissued by Shueisha in 2007, with all chapters fitting into only 6 volumes, instead of the original 7; all volumes had new covers.

== Plot ==
16-year-old high-school gymnast Maron Kusakabe is visited by the angel Finn Fish, who gives her a task. God's power is scattered across the Earth, and if He does not gather enough by the turn of the millennium, He will die. To block Him, The Devil had sent out agents to gather His power, which is the beauty in human hearts, in the form of chess pieces. With Finn's assistance, Maron transforms into the reincarnation of Joan of Arc in order to hunt Demons hidden within works of art. When Maron seals a Demon, the artwork disappears, and to the outside world it is as if she has stolen it, and she becomes a phantom thief. Maron's best friend is Miyako, the daughter of a police detective in charge of Jeanne's case.

As the series progresses, Maron and Miyako fall in love with new classmate Chiaki, who wants to stop Maron collecting the chess pieces, for he knew that Finn Fish is the Fallen Angel, but apparently in the form of normal angel. Chiaki at first "fakes" falling in love to get closer to Maron, knowing Maron is Jeanne. Later he falls in love truthfully after realising that Maron is worth the effort, even if she does "hate" him. Maron, on the other hand, is confused and does not know what "love" means because her parents abandoned her when she was around ten years old when they were having problems getting along, so no one taught her. As a result, she does not know how to respond to Chiaki's advances.

The manga relates in detail Finn Fish's background, expounding on Finn's relationships with other angels and the events that led to her becoming Maron's partner. This backstory of the angels is not shown in the anime. Phantom Thief Jeanne has often drawn comparisons to Sailor Moon for the magical girl theme and similarity in appearance between Phantom Thief Jeanne and Sailor Moon.

== Characters ==
=== Main characters ===
Maron Kusakabe (日下部 まろん, Kusakabe Maron)
The protagonist of the series, Maron is a beautiful 16-year-old (17-year-old from chapter 19) high school girl and rhythmic gymnast, who can also transform into the supernatural "Phantom Thief Jeanne" (怪盗 ジャンヌ, Kaitō Jannu). Maron lives in an apartment alone—having been left by her parents, who seem to work abroad but are really possessed by demons. She is well liked at school, especially in chapter 11, when many boys from her school offer to escort her home on Valentine's Day, and request chocolate valentines from her. She is also very stubborn and head-strong. Even so, Maron is a lonely young woman who hides her feelings behind a warm smile.
Before the series began, Maron had encountered a tiny female angel named Finn Fish, who gave her a mission from God to seal away demons. These demons attempt to steal the beauty in human hearts, in order to increase the Devil's powers. Maron was given a mystical rosary with a large crucifix, by which she could transform into Phantom Thief Jeanne, the reincarnation of Joan of Arc, who then captures the demons. Her theme color is white.
Finn delivers Jeanne's advance notices that she will steal the painting to the possessed human's house. Then the police and Miyako come. Then at exactly 9 o'clock, from out of nowhere, Jeanne appears. She captures the demon and disappears into the night. Even though Jeanne does some property damage and steals paintings, the victims report neither the property damage nor the stolen paintings because they like the angel paintings more than the demon paintings.
Her crucifix will give off a certain sound when a demon is near. Other than the noise, the possessed human will have fangs – if the person smiles while doing something evil. She even uses it to communicate with Finn when she is not there. Maron finds out that, in chapter 12, her crucifix was to help her be Jeanne, to be invincible, with help from Finn. She actually holds a greater power within her that can make an ocean sparkle and makes the sky turn clear. Then her holy powers awakened. Her ribbon acts as an extra hand. It can help her reach high or far places or items. If Jeanne takes off the ribbon holding her hair together, she becomes Maron.
Even though she has her parents' phone number and address, she is afraid she would once again be "thrown away" by her parents, and thus refuses to contact them. The only time she is contacted by her parents is by her mother, in order to tell her they are divorcing. She is afraid of the night and darkness because her parents weren't there to comfort her loneliness, despair, and terror.
Maron is very close with her friend Miyako, though she still holds her at a distance. In the beginning, she sees Chiaki as merely a playboy, and refuses to trust him as he had always seemed to be hitting on her. However, after the incident when Maron was told of her parents' divorce, Chiaki found Maron alone in tears, and he encouraged her to believe in herself. This was a turning point for Maron: Chiaki's kindness helped her trust others, and it also sparked romantic feelings toward Chiaki. At first, she was surprised and dismayed about Chiaki's/Sinbad's identity, but she came to fall in love with him even more. Throughout the series, she tries to confess to him, but something always happens. She ends up not confessing before because if she did, she will hurt Miyako's feelings. Finally, in the second-to-last chapter, she confesses to him that she loves him and they sleep together. Seven years later, Maron is 24 years old, married to Chiaki, and has a daughter named Natsuki who is the reincarnation of Finn.
Maron ends up going through a time slip in chapter 22. She meets the real Joan of Arc and dragged Noin with her. With her final breath, Jeanne gave Maron her power and transformed in chapter 23. She doesn't need a pin to seal the demon, instead, her "courage" brings forth a sword.
Maron gives up her reincarnation power to have Finn reborn. She stops being a thief. She finally sees her parents (remarried to each other) again in chapter 30.
Her punch is so strong that she can crack a chalkboard and even break a brick wall.
Jeanne has some different physical features from Maron, and also possesses certain supernatural powers.
In chapter 29, Maron learns that her first reincarnation was Eve. In the anime television series, Maron is voiced by Houko Kuwashima.
Chiaki Nagoya (名古屋 稚空, Nagoya Chiaki)
Chiaki is a male student at Maron's school, who can transform into "Phantom Thief Sinbad" (怪盗 シンドバッド, Kaitō Shindobaddo), Jeanne's rival, who also collects demons' powers. Maron doesn't realize Sinbad is really Chiaki, but he already knows of her double-identity. At the very beginning of the series, Chiaki moves into Maron's and Miyako's building and transfers to their class, in order to get close to Maron, to stop her from collecting the demons. At first, Chiaki is portrayed as a playboy, whom Maron despises. However, as time passes, he falls in love with her, and he's able to gain Maron's trust, and eventually love, by helping her out of tough situations, and helping her regain her courage-both as Chiaki and as Sinbad. After Chiaki catches Maron staring sadly at her empty mailbox, he begins dropping her "useless" notes, as one of Chiaki's many ways of trying to cheer her up. He is the first person that Maron told about her parents. Like Maron, Chiaki lives alone, having run away because he was tired of his father's continuing to marry new women after his mother's death when he was 5 years old. He later reconciles with his father, after introducing him to Maron.
Chiaki, too, is accompanied by a small male angel, Access Time, who gave him the power to become Phantom Thief Sinbad. Like Jeanne, his crucifix helps him transform and is used to communicate with Access. It is eventually revealed that Chiaki had been attempting to stop Maron, because he knew of Finn's being an agent for the Devil, rather than for the God, and was using Maron to help him. He had wanted to seduce her in order to make her stop, but he began to find himself blushing each time Maron smiled to him, which he tried to lie to himself by telling himself that it is just "false affection" (in the manga), or that he was being moody (in the anime). After Maron discovers he was also Phantom Thief Sinbad, and that he was just trying to seduce her to make her stop being a Phantom Thief, he realizes his affection for her, and fights to regain her trust. His theme color is black.
If the bandana around Sinbad's head is undone, he returns to Chiaki. From his cross, he can summon multiple pins. He learns that his previous self was Adam.
His heart was manipulated by a demon that possessed Miyako in chapter 27. When Maron freed Miyako, he stops being manipulated but he was teleported to the Devil's palace.
In the second-to-last chapter, he is overjoyed when Maron confesses her love to him and confesses to her, and they sleep together. Seven years later, Chiaki is 24 years old, a doctor in training, married to Maron, and has a daughter named Natsuki who is Finn's reincarnation. In the anime television series, Chiaki is voiced by Susumu Chiba.
Miyako Todaiji (東大寺 都, Tōdaiji Miyako)
Miyako is Maron's classmate and friend since childhood, who lives to the left of Maron's apartment (Chiaki's apartment is to the right of Maron's). Miyako and Maron both met in the same kindergarten when they were 5 years old. Miyako's father is a police detective and, desiring to follow in his footsteps, Miyako frequently aids in trying to catch Jeanne, and eventually Sinbad as well. She was sad when Jeanne didn't show up in chapter 7.
Because of her personality, she was once accused of stealing the class's lunch money. No one believed that she didn't steal it but only Maron did, and it was the teacher who had it. It then became a habit for her to say the opposite of what she felt. She depended too much on Maron's tenderness and didn't notice her sad tears. When she first started high school, she learns of Jeanne. Her female classmates think that Maron is very similar to Jeanne. Since she knows how it feels to be suspected, Miyako decided, from then on, to catch Jeanne to prove Maron's innocence and to protect her smile. It was revealed in chapter 27 that Miyako knew all along. If her father or the other police caught Jeanne, Miyako would pretend to mess up and let her go. Then they will let it go since she is too young for police work. Miyako knew that Jeanne wasn't there for the money. In the anime adaptation, Miyako is unaware that Maron is Jeanne and is deeply hurt when Maron is forced to transform in front of her. The pain allows Finn to use Miyako to attack Maron, but Maron is eventually able to wake her up.
Stubborn and with a fierce temper, Miyako notes during the series that even with her, Maron is sometimes distant and that it bothers her. She drops rhythmic gymnastic balls on top of Maron during unsuspecting moments. She was possessed by a demon in chapter 27. Maron was able to seal the demon. Maron told her everything in chapter 27. Miyako suspected that she was Jeanne since the beginning.
Miyako is initially in love with Chiaki, and is jealous of Maron, but later accepts Maron's and Chiaki's growing relationship. When Yamato confesses to her, Miyako thinks he's only joking, as Yamato had long been in love with Maron. He eventually convinces her of his sincerity and at the end of the series Miyako and Yamato marry, and have a son named Shinji who is Access's reincarnation. In the anime television series, Miyako is voiced by Naoko Matsui.
Finn Fish (フィン·フィッシュ, Fin Fisshu)
Finn Fish is the small female semi-angel who helps Maron detect demons, and gave her the power to transform into Phantom Thief Jeanne. When Maron first saw her, she thought Finn was a fairy. In chapter 19, Maron learns that Finn is actually the devil's advocate. Her real job is to hurt Joan of Arc's reincarnation, Maron Kusakabe. If she fills Maron's heart with evil, she will get hurt, and her powers will disappear. The Devil needed God's power – humans' beauty and purity that were in their hearts – so he used the demons just for that. Then vanquish them to be turned into his power. But the God placed one-third of his power into a soul that is able to reincarnate, a heart filled with beauty and purity. If the soul is alive, God cannot be killed. The demons tried to possess the spirit but cannot because of its purity. The Devil killed the spirit's reincarnations in frustration but they were still able to be reborn over and over, the last being Joan of Arc. When the spirit was reborn as Maron, The Devil devised a plan. If the spirit can't be broken from the outside, then break it from the inside: hurt her heart and take her purity then her powers will disappear. The voice Maron heard in chapter 12 was actually The Devil's; seal was broken. Maron's heart was actually broken from the start when The Devil manipulated her parents.
Before she went to the human world, her wings became pure white. She became a pure angel of high standard. Her green hair is even more powerful than angels with white hair. Her former self was of pure heart that stayed until death. Sagami cuts off her hair to weaken her but it had the opposite effect. Her power became uncontrollable and exploded in a large radius. She killed many humans and Sagami in the process. Then she was banished from heaven and sentenced to death. Before she entered the Gate of Destruction, The Devil offered her salvation in return for her to become his servant. Then she became a fallen angel.
She manipulates Maron into gathering the chess pieces for the Devil. Later, Finn explains that she really wanted to live so she could see Access again, because she had always loved him. In the manga, since she has a relationship with an angel, it is a total betrayal to Maou so she is to disappear. Access cut off his hair and gave her his power. It only helped a little bit. Celcia and Toki gave their powers to her and Finn was able to escape from banishment. But Access, Celcia, and Toki turned back into dark angels.
During the final battle with the Devil (chapter 30), Finn realizes her wrongs and sacrifices herself to save Maron. Maron gives up her reincarnation power to save Finn. In the manga epilogue, years later, she is reincarnated as Natsuki, the daughter of Chiaki and Maron. Natsuki remembers Access and rejects Shinji's advances in hopes of reuniting with Access. However, when she learns that Shinji is Access's reincarnation, she returns his feelings. In the anime, Finn was kidnapped and brainwashed by the Devil, and did not realize she was working for him until all of the demons were collected. In the anime television series, Finn is voiced by Kumiko Nishihara.
Access Time (アクセス·タイム, Akusesu Taimu)
Access Time is the small male black angel who helps Chiaki detect demons, and who gave Chiaki the power to transform into Phantom Thief Sinbad. He is called a dark angel because he hasn't become a pure angel yet. He is in love with Finn Fish, and worked hard to become a full angel so he could be with her. When they were in Heaven, Access always confesses his love for Finn. She rejects him everytime. He likes to eat hotcakes. He was able to become a pure angel in chapter 26 (with help from God). When he touched Finn, because she was a fallen angel, he got a lot of his power absorbed.
When Finn is killed by The Devil, Access gives Finn his black earring as a memento, so that the two would meet again when she reincarnated as a human. He himself becomes a semi-angel and also dies. He is reborn as Shinji, the son of Miyako and Yamato. When Shinji is four years old, he recognizes Natsuki as the reincarnation of Finn by the earring she was holding after she was born, and proposes to her on the spot. Shinji has remained in love with Natsuki ever since, even stealing her first kiss when she was 3 years old. He frequently professes his love to her, even though she continues rejecting him. However, when he confesses that he is Access's reincarnation, she confesses her love to him. In the anime television series, Access is voiced by Akiko Yajima.

=== Antagonists ===
Noin Claude (ノイン・クロード, Noin Kurōdo)
Noin is a demon who disguises himself as history teacher Hijiri Shikaido (紫界堂 聖, Shikaidō Hijiri) at Maron's school. He is a "friend" of Maron's father. He has the ability to know where and who are possessed by a demon.
Five hundred years ago, he was a French knight who assisted the original Joan of Arc and was in love with her. They became lovers. Jeanne's power to seal demons and save the world can only be done by a pure virgin. He hated God so much since he can't touch her and inevitably attracted demons. Unable to protect Joan of Arc from death, he gave his soul to the Devil, and vowed to fall in love with Jeanne's reincarnated form. His human heart, which was possessed by a demon, evolves into a stronger demon and can't die. He was asked by the Devil to separate Jeanne's and Sinbad's relationship and in return, transform into a human. After he confirms Maron is Jeanne's reincarnation, he does fall in love with her and tries to interfere with her collecting, culminating in his attempting to strangle her as she can't transform.
When Maron travels back in time to meet Jeanne d'Arc during her final hours in chapter 22, Noin goes with her and regrets what he had done. He remembers who had him possess his past self in chapter 24. His future self had a demon possess his past self. He let it repeat during the time travel because he wants to meet Maron. In the anime adaptation, he dies protecting Maron, and is reunited with Joan of Arc. In the anime television series, Noin is voiced by Kappei Yamaguchi.
Myst (ミスト, Misuto)
Myst is a demon-villainess and anime only-character appeared in the second season, who she was a demonic 6 year old girl. She has a Candy box filled with candies and uses them to summon the demons.
In episode 40, by getting her rage, Myst confronts Noin that she cannot let the Queen have Jeanne and she eats more of her candies turning her into a monstrous-demon trying to kill Jeanne with her vengeance. As her defeat by Jeanne with her attack, Myst retrieved her Candy Box and saying by her last words to Jeanne and she disappeared and never to be seen again. In the anime television series, Myst is voiced by Wakana Yamazaki.
Silk (シルク, Shiruku)
Silk is Noin's dragon companion. He can transform into a human-like child with a horn on his forehead. Even in human form, he can breathe fire. Noin likes to bully him because he and Maron became good friends recently.
Devil (魔王, Maou)
The Devil is God's feeling of sorrow that he threw away. He tries to steal God's powers. He wants to destroy all things. Maron checkmate him in the final chapter of the manga (chapter 30). He tries to take her with him but Finn blocked him. Finn tells the Devil that she is going to go there with him. He thanks her and they both die.

=== Teachers ===
Pakkyamlamao Igarashi (パッキャラマオ五十嵐, Pakkyaramao Igarashi)
Pakkyamlamao is the teacher in charge of the gymnastics club and the homeroom teacher for Maron, Chiaki, Yamato and Miyako. She loves flowers and lives in Kakimachi. She was possessed by a demon in chapter 1 of the manga.
Hasegawa
Hasegawa understands the beauty of the love and affection of Valentine's Day. The demon that possessed him made him feel opposite. He would steal chocolates from stores and confiscate female students' chocolates.

=== Humans ===
Yamato Minazuki (水無月 大和, Minazuki Yamato)
Yamato is a classmate of Maron, Chiaki, and Miyako, and is the class president. His parents own Momokuri Theme Park, which they visited in chapter 3. Because of his gentle, unassuming nature, he doesn't get much respect. Whenever Chiaki sees Yamato running, he would try to trip him. Initially, he was a weak person, but with help from his friends, he grew stronger. He initially has a crush on Maron, and tries to capture Sinbad because of it, but later gives up on her and comes to fall in love with Miyako while joining her in trying to catch Sinbad. When he confesses his feelings in chapter 27, Miyako angrily pushes him in a lake, thinking he is toying with her. Eventually he is able to convince her that his feelings are genuine, and at the end of the series they are married with a son named Shinji who is Access' reincarnation. In the anime adaptation, Yamato is depicted as being so innocent and pure of heart that he is particularly susceptible to demon possession. In the anime television series, Yamato is voiced by Naozumi Takahashi.
Joan of Arc (ジャンヌ・ダルク, Jannu Daruku)
She was Maron's past self. She is the real Jeanne, not Maron's Jeanne form. She was a strong willed woman who looks to the future. She was in love with Noin. The day before her trial, she lost her purity to a guard who was possessed by a demon. When she dies, the holy power within her set the town people free from the demons. When Maron and Noin went into the past, instead of Jeanne's power releasing the townspeople, she gave Maron her power. Maron was able to transform at the expense of Jeanne's death. Maron released her ashes to the air to be reborn again.
Yashiro Sazanka (山茶花 弥白, Sazanka Yashiro)
Yashiro was Chiaki's former fiancée that was arranged by their parents. She is a gymnast at Biwa Academy. She got possessed by a demon because of her unrequited feelings for him. After she got released from the demon's possession by Jeanne, she confessed her feelings. Unfortunately, he turned her down. She marries Kagura and have twins, Celcia and Toki.
Kaiki Nagoya (名古屋 海生, Nagoya Kaiki)
Kaiki is Chiaki's widowed father. He is the head doctor and the current owner of the Nagoya Hospital; Chiaki will be its successor. Chiaki looks so much like him and where he got his playboy personality from. He always seems to be very happy and likes playing jokes. As of chapter 9, he was married and divorced four times. When he was possessed by a demon, he tried to force Chiaki to return home. He even kidnapped his hospital patients, Chiaki, and Jeanne. They were hidden in the floor below their figure diorama selves. The demon in him was strong, proving that the devil was getting stronger with each passing day. After Jeanne seals the demon, Chiaki finds out that the reason why his father keeps remarrying is because Chiaki needs a mother. He stops forcing Chiaki to go back home and let him do whatever he wants. Even after seven years goes by, he is still popular amongst the nurses.
Kagura Kanataki (彼方木 神楽, Kanataki Kagura)
Kagura is Chiaki's father's assistant. He is a cool and collected guy. He only shows his anger when Kaiki sneaked out of the hospital and cried when Chiaki decided not to return home (chapter 11 in the manga). He likes Yashiro so if someone hurts her, he beats them up. He marries Yashiro and have twins, Celcia and Toki.
Takumi Kusakabe (日下部 匠, Kusakabe Takumi)
Takumi is Maron's father and a famous architect. He named a French theme park 'Maron Dome' after her and finished it on her birthday, May 30th. He used to work at Momokuri Theme Park when he was younger. He met his future wife, Koron, at one of the merry-go-rounds. Koron was worried that if she rode it, she would get mud on her long skirt. He became a footstool for her. Months later, he worked at an architecture company and was asked to remodel Momokuri Theme Park. He met a freelance architect who was Koron. He remarries Koron. They meet their daughter again in chapter 30.
Koron Kusakabe (日下部 ころん, Kusakabe Koron)
Koron is Maron's mother and was a freelance architect before she met Takumi, her husband. She is childhood friends with Miyako's mother. She remarries Takumi. They meet their daughter again in chapter 30.
Subaru Toudaiji (東大寺 昴, Tõdaiji Subaru)
Subaru is Miyako's older brother. He is near-sighted and kind. He would cry for a whole day if he didn't eat a banana for lunch. When he was possessed, he would create earthquakes with a machine he created to stop earthquakes.
Zen Takazuchiya (高土屋 全, Takazuchiya Zen)
Zen was in Chiaki's hospital for five years. He had a demon possessing his heart, which kept him alive for so long. He is able to see Finn because the demon absorbed much of his heart. If he went to school, he would be in eighth grade. He wants to see his parents so much that he tries to escape multiple times. Maron respects him for trying to escape while see can't have the courage to call her father so she helps him escape. They learn that Zen's mother will not visit him and will wait until he returns home instead. He fell in love with Maron at first sight. He is first seen in chapter 14 of the manga and dies in chapter 16. In chapter 30, Zen becomes an angel.
Sagami Kugahara (久ヶ原 相模, Kugahara Sagami)
He is the first human Finn, Celcia, and Toki met when they went to the human world. He caught Celcia when she fainted after breathing in the human world's air. Everytime Finn saw him, her heart would beat. It wasn't because she was in love with him. It was because her heart was warning her. Finn out in chapter 21 that Sagami sacrificed his younger sister to make more holy water. He only cares about money. His heart was possessed by a demon.
Natsuki Kugahara (久ヶ原 魚月, Kugahara Natsuki)
She is Sagami's younger sister. He said she died three years ago from sickness but he actually sacrificed her to help him increase the amount of holy water. Finn is her when she became an angel.

=== Non-humans ===
God (神, Kami)
A long time ago, he had a body and lived in paradise alone. He used his power to create a human that looks just like him and called it "Adam". Then he used Adam's bones to create another human called "Eve". God loved both of them equally but loved Eve with passion. When Eve ate the forbidden fruit, she realized that God and them are different. Adam and Eve were banned by God from paradise. God loved Eve so he gave her the power of "reincarnation" and Adam the power to protect Eve. God was alone once again. He threw away his feelings of sorrow in hopes it would go away. Instead, he grew stronger from absorbing "lonely" feelings from humans. It then transformed into the person called "Devil". God didn't want the Devil to destroy the human race but he couldn't destroy his own feelings. God chose someone who can defeat the Devil but a normal human can't live long enough so he chose someone who can reincarnate, Eve. God asked Maron to rescue Maou from loneliness.
Celcia Form (セルシア・フォーム, Serushia Fõmu)
One of the only three pure angels; others being Finn and Toki. Their mission is to go into the human world, bask and store the sunlight to increase their power, and someday they may develop into a spirit that can reincarnate. She has the habit of breaking laws. She was caught by a human after entering the human world. Sagami froze her along with Toki in the ice. Access finds and frees them. She was reincarnated as Sarah, a daughter of Sazanka and Kagura.
Toki Haiyar (トキ・ハイヤー, Toki Haiyã)
One of the only three pure angels; others being Finn and Celcia. Their mission is to go into the human world, bask and store the sunlight to increase their power, and someday they may develop into a spirit that can reincarnate. He likes to flirt with Finn when he actually loves her. Sagami froze him along with Celcia in the ice. Access finds and frees them. He was reincarnated as a son of Sazanka and Kagura.

== Media ==
=== Manga ===
Phantom Thief Jeanne is written and illustrated by Arina Tanemura. It was serialized in the monthly magazine Ribon from February 1998 to July 2000. The chapters were later released in 7 bound volumes by Shueisha under the Ribon Mascot Comics imprint.

Beginning July 2007, Phantom Thief Jeanne was republished in 6 kanzenban editions with new cover illustrations. Later, beginning June 18, 2013, Shueisha republished again in bunkoban editions under Shueisha Bunkoban imprint.

Phantom Thief Jeanne was initially licensed in English for North American distribution by CMX in 2004, where it was published under its original transliterated title Kamikaze Kaito Jeanne. After CMX became defunct, in August 2013, Viz Media announced they had acquired the English license and began republishing the 2013 bunkoban reprint for North American distribution, with the first volume published in March 2014.

==== Tankōbon editions ====
No.	Original release date	Original ISBN	English (CMX) release date	English (CMX) ISBN
1	September 1998	978-4-08-856100-4	October 26, 2005	978-1-4012-0555-3
2	January 1999	978-4-08-856120-2	January 25, 2006	978-1-4012-0556-0
3	May 1999	978-4-08-856142-4	April 26, 2006	978-1-4012-0557-7
4	September 1999	978-4-08-856163-9	July 26, 2006	978-1-4012-0558-4
5	February 2000	978-4-08-856189-9	September 27, 2006	978-1-4012-0559-1
6	June 2000	978-4-08-856211-7	November 15, 2006	978-1-4012-0842-4
7	August 2000	978-4-08-856221-6	January 17, 2007	978-1-4012-0843-1

==== Kanzenban editions ====
No.	Japanese release date	Japanese ISBN
1	June 15, 2007	978-4088551456
2	June 15, 2007	978-4088551463
3	July 13, 2007	978-4088551470
4	August 10, 2007	978-4088551487
5	September 14, 2007	978-4088551494
6	October 15, 2007	978-4088551500

==== Bunkoban editions ====
No.	Original release date	Original ISBN	English (Viz Media) release date	English (Viz Media) ISBN
1	June 18, 2013	978-4-08-619426-6	March 4, 2014	978-1-4215-6590-3
2	June 18, 2013	978-4-08-619427-3	May 6, 2014	978-1-4215-7704-3
3	July 18, 2013	978-4-08-619428-0	July 1, 2014	978-1-4215-6627-6
4	July 18, 2013	978-4-08-619429-7	September 2, 2014	978-1-4215-6628-3
5	August 20, 2013	978-4-08-619430-3	November 4, 2014	978-1-4215-6629-0

==== Dōjinshi ====
Under the pseudonym "Meguro Teikoku", Tanemura has also self-published unofficial dōjinshi of the series and sold limited copies exclusively at Comiket in August 2014.

No.	Title	Japanese release date	Japanese ISBN
1	lit. Rose Rose Toile; Bara Bara Toeru (薔薇薔薇トエル)	August 16, 2014	—
2	lit. A Rondo From a Promise with an Angel; Tenshi to Yakusoku no Rinbukyoku (天使と約束の輪舞曲)	August 16, 2014	—

=== Artbook ===
In June 2000, Shueisha published an artbook for the series entitled Tanemura Arina Irasuto Shū Kamikaze Kaitō Jannu (種村有菜イラスト集 神風怪盗ジャンヌ).

=== Light novels ===
A light novel adaptation written by Shuka Matsuta was released under the Shueisha Mirai Bunko imprint, with illustrations by Tanemura.

No.	Title	Japanese release date	Japanese ISBN
1	lit. Phantom Thief Jeanne 1: The Beautiful Phantom Thief Has Now Arrived! Kamikaze Kaitō Jannu 1: Bishōjo Kaitō, Tadaima Sanjō! (神風怪盗ジャンヌ 1 美少女怪盗、ただいま参上!)	December 15, 2013	978-4083211874
2	lit. Phantom Thief Jeanne 2: Sinbad, the Mysterious Thief!? Kamikaze Kaitō Jannu 2: Nazo no Kaitō Shindobaddo!? (神風怪盗ジャンヌ 2 謎の怪盗シンドバッド!?)	February 5, 2014	978-4083211959
3	lit. Phantom Thief Jeanne 3: Fate has Begun! Kamikaze Kaitō Jannu 3: Ugokidashita Unmei! (神風怪盗ジャンヌ 3 動きだした運命!)	May 2, 2014	978-4083212116
4	lit. Phantom Thief Jeanne 4: The Final Checkmate; Kamikaze Kaitō Jannu 4: Saigo no Chekkumeito (神風怪盗ジャンヌ 4 最後のチェックメイト)	August 5, 2014	978-4083212260

=== Anime ===
Phantom Thief Jeanne was adapted as a 44-episode anime television series that was broadcast on TV Asahi from February 13, 1999, to January 29, 2000. The series was directed by Atsutoshi Umezawa at Toei Animation, written by Sukehiro Tomita, character designed by Hisashi Kagawa, chief animation direction by Katsumi Tamegai, music by Michiaki Kato. The anime starred Houko Kuwashima as the voice of Maron Kusakabe/"Phantom Thief Jeanne". The opening themes are "Piece of Love" by Shazna for episodes 1–27 and "Dive into Shine" by Lastier for episodes 28–44, and the ending themes are "Haruka..." (ハルカ...) by Pierrot for episodes 1–27 and "Till The End" by Hibiki for episodes 28–44. The series was broadcast on The Anime Network in the United States.

== Reception ==
Publishers Weekly stated that the stories "lack in suspense" but praised the art styles and the characters, highlighting Maron's ability to balance both sides of herself.
