= List of Angelic Layer episodes =

The cover of the Angelic Layer collector's edition from Anime Limited

Angelic Layer (Japanese: エンジェリックレイヤー, Hepburn: Enjerikku Reiyā) is a Japanese anime adapting the manga of the same name by Clamp. Renamed Battle Doll: Angelic Layer (機動天使エンジェリックレイヤー, Kidou Tenshi Angelic Layer), it was produced by Bones, directed by Hiroshi Nishikiori, and written by Ichirō Ōkouchi. Character design was by Takahiro Komori, and the music was composed by Kohei Tanaka. The series follows Misaki Suzuhara, a schoolgirl who learns to play "Angelic Layer", a game in which players fight using dolls. Misaki enters professional competitions with her doll Hikaru.

The series first premiered on TV Tokyo on April 1, 2001, and finished on September 23, 2001, with a total of 26 episodes. The opening theme is "Be My Angel" by Atsuko Enomoto, the first ending theme is "The Starry Sky" by HAL, and the second ending theme is "After the rain" by Moeko Matsushita.

Angelic Layer was originally released in Japan across nine DVD sets, the first coming out on July 25, 2001, and was then brought out as a limited edition box set on March 3, 2004. It was released in North America by ADV Films across seven DVD sets, the first released on October 14, 2003, and then in the United Kingdom on April 19, 2004. The series was then released as a complete collection in North America on September 27, 2005, and in the UK on February 9, 2009. Angelic Layer then came out as a Blu-ray collector's edition in Japan, originally scheduled for March 26, 2010, but postponed until September 24, 2010. It was then released on Blu-ray by Sentai Filmworks in North America on December 13, 2016. Anime Limited released a Blu-ray collection in the UK on September 24, 2018, which also featured a 40-page artbook.

In 2001, Angelic Layer won the "Television Award" in the 6th Animation Kobe awards.

== Episode list ==
No.	English Title (Note: All English titles are taken from HIDIVE.) Original Japanese title	Original release date
1	"How Do You Do? My Very Own Angel!"; Transliteration: "Hajimemashite! Watashidake no Enjeru" (Japanese: はじめまして! 私だけのエンジェル)	April 1, 2001
Twelve-year-old Misaki Suzuhara arrives from Wakayama to Tokyo. She becomes interested in Angelic Layer after seeing a battle on screen and meeting the mysterious Ichiro Mihara (Icchan). She creates her Angel, Hikaru, when she arrives at her Aunt's apartment later that night.
2	"Do Your Best, Hikaru! It's Your First Fight!!"; Transliteration: "Ganbare Hikaru! Hajimete no faito!!" (Japanese: がんばれヒカル! はじめてのファイト!!)	April 8, 2001
Misaki learns more about Angelic Layer and even partakes in a competition battle herself, though by accident. She also meets classmates Kotaro Kobayashi and Tamayo Kizaki as well as fellow and famous Deus Hatoko Kobayashi.
3	"Who Are You? Misaki's Heart Nervous Lesson"; Transliteration: "Anata wa dare? Misaki no dokidoki resson" (Japanese: あなたは誰? みさきのドキドキレッスン)	April 15, 2001
Misaki receives more instruction from Icchan in terms of controlling Hikaru and practices with Ohjiro Mihara later. Engaged in an unfair pick-up battle soon after, she applies those lessons and earns, not only an Angel Card, but a place in the Angelic Layer Tournament this year.
4	"The Day an Angel Flew Down"; Transliteration: "Tenshi ga maiorita hi" (Japanese: 天使が舞いおりた日)	April 22, 2001
Misaki's first official Tournament begins as she faces off with Angel Katalina, an Angel that uses ice skates to incorporate into her special attacks. We also get to see Hatoko's famous Angel, Lightspeed Suzuka, in action.
5	"I Don't Want to Lose! I'm Believing in Hikaru..."; Transliteration: "Maketakunai! Hikaru o shinjite..." (Japanese: 負けたくない!ヒカルを信じて...)	April 29, 2001
Misaki enjoys playing Angelic Layer and she loves Hikaru with all her heart, but when she goes up against the Power-type Vasquez, her confidence and self-esteem falters and has Hikaru engage in the "hit and run" technique during battle, winning by a sheer stroke of luck. This angers Hatoko, who claims that Misaki has stopped believing in Hikaru and in herself.
6	"Suzuka, the Speed of Light! Hatoko's Declaration of Rivalry!!"; Transliteration: "Kosoku no Suzuka! Hatoko no raibaru sengen!!" (Japanese: 光速の鈴鹿! 鳩子のライバル宣言!!)	May 6, 2001
Misaki and Hikaru are on a winning streak, impressing many at her school, but Hatoko tells her that she won't get any farther if she continues to fight the way that she is. When Misaki and Hatoko square off in the Layer, Suzuka is out to test Hikaru's true worth as well as Misaki's.
7	"Fight at the Edge... Misaki's Last Chance!"; Transliteration: "Girigiri no tatakai... Misaki no rasuto chansu" (Japanese: ギリギリの戦い... みさきのラストチャンス)	May 13, 2001
Her devastating loss against Suzuka has left Misaki afraid to enter the heat of battle again, fearing for Hikaru's safety. However, while fighting against Maria, a girl who believes that her Angel Tsubaki is all that she has in life, Misaki realizes that Hatoko meant no harm at all and that Angelic Layer is meant to be fun.
8	"Misaki VS Misaki? A Dangerous Classmate"; Transliteration: "Misaki VS Misaki? Kiken na dōkyusei" (Japanese: みさきVSミサキ? 危険な同級生)	May 20, 2001
Misaki has qualified for the regional Tournament and could not be more excited, but a classmate that shares her first name does not believe that she's so good at her game and challenges her to a three-round match. Feeling unsure of herself still in terms of whether or not she can make it in the Regional Tournament, Misaki finds comfort in Ringo Seto's words and feels prepared for the Regionals at last.
9	"Sing, Misaki! Is the Deus an Idol?!"; Transliteration: "Utae! Misaki Deusu wa aidoru!?" (Japanese: 歌え! みさき デウスはアイドル!?)	May 27, 2001
The Regional Tournament has arrived and Misaki learns that, not only is she fighting against pop singer Ringo Seto, but she can't afford to lose just once or she'll be out of the Tournament for good. To make things much more difficult, Ringo's Angel Ranga has a special attack, the Dance of Death, that threatens to blow Hikaru right out of the Layer.
10	"Mean Sisters! Hikaru, the Target"; Transliteration: "Ijiwaru shimai! Nerawareta Hikaru" (Japanese: いじわる姉妹! 狙われたヒカル)	June 3, 2001
The Fujisaki Sisters are pretty popular in the Layer, but they have a personal grudge against Hatoko and Suzuka, each vowing not to lose at any cost until they face her again in the Layer. Nervous about Hikaru's progression, Arisu plants a device on Hikaru that cuts her off from Misaki now and again, causing her to freeze up and falter on the Layer.
11	"Finish It Off! Hikaru & Mao's Important Game"; Transliteration: "Ketchaku! Hikaru to Mao no shinken shobu" (Japanese: 決着! ヒカルとマオの真剣勝負)	June 10, 2001
As she aids Hikaru in fighting off the effects of Arisu's cheat device, Misaki shows Madoka and Mao that Angelic Layer is not about competing or holding grudges, but about having fun, plain and simple. Oujiro comes to the rescue and Hikaru wins, securing a slot in the Semis. But fellow Deus and finalist Sai Jounouchi claims to have figured out Hikaru's weakness.
12	"Misaki & Kotaro. Their Exciting Date"; Transliteration: "Misaki to Kotaro Futari no wakuwaku dēto" (Japanese: みさきと虎太郎 二人のわくわくデート)	June 17, 2001
In order to help Misaki prepare for the Semis, Kotaro offers to take her to his dojo to show her some moves. However, as Tamayo crashes the party, it soon becomes obvious that Tamayo may be hiding her true feelings from her childhood friend.
13	"Pure White Blanche, Kaede's Smile"; Transliteration: "Junpaku no Buranshe Kaede no hohoemi" (Japanese: 純白のブランシェ 楓のほほえみ)	June 24, 2001
The Semis have arrived and so has the creation of the Environmental Layers, Layers that simulate terrain for more amazing battle opportunities. As Misaki and Kaede's Angels, Hikaru and Blanche, square off, it soon becomes obvious that Misaki's concentration is off; her mother promised to come, but she is nowhere in sight. Turns out that Shuuko was too scared to face her daughter and refused to come, leaving Misaki in a pickle as she discovers Blanche's secret.
14	"I Won't Give Up! And an Angel Was Born"; Transliteration: "Akiramenai! Soshite tenshi wa umareta" (Japanese: あきらめない! そして天使は生まれた)	July 1, 2001
Blanche's Hyper Mode gives her more strength and speed than any other Angel that Misaki has come across and she is not giving Hikaru much of a chance. Just when it seems that all hope is lost, Misaki realizes that, not only are her friends and fans counting on her, but Hikaru is too. Will it be enough to help her win the match?
15	"Shirahime Versus Suzuka! Secret of the Ice Machine"; Transliteration: "Shirahime vs Suzuka! Aisu Mashīn no himitsu" (Japanese: 白姫VS鈴鹿! アイスマシーンの秘密)	July 8, 2001
The next battle pits Sai and Hatoko's Angels, Shirahime and Suzuka, in a duel of veterans. After a tense showdown, the winner is declared to be, by one point, Shirahime. Heartbroken that she failed to keep her end of the promise and experiencing true loss for the very first time, Hatoko cries on Misaki's shoulder as she promises to win against Sai for her. But Sai is not impressed, stating that she has her weak point all figured out and that someone so small has no hope of winning.
16	"The Final Game! Hikaru's Last Attack"; Transliteration: "Kesshosen! Hikaru no rasuto atakku" (Japanese: 決勝戦! ヒカルのラストアタック)	July 15, 2001
The Regional Finals are here and Misaki is out to fulfill her promise to Hatoko. But can she? Hikaru's attacks have no effect and the simplest of hits she takes from Shirahime takes chunks out of her HP. Misaki is not the only one with a promise, Sai wanting to become stronger in memory of her sister, but which ambition will win out in the end?
17	"I've Made My Mind Up on You! The One Misaki Selected"; Transliteration: "Anata ni kimeta! Misaki no eranda hito" (Japanese: あなたに決めた! みさきの選んだヒト)	July 22, 2001
With the Nationals coming her way, Misaki feels nervous, but a surprise visit from her friends changes all that. Oujiro's gift to her makes Kotaro jealous as Misaki's mother struggles to bring herself to visit her daughter. On top of all that, Misaki learns that she must choose a Second, an advisor for the game, to participate with her in the Nationals. Hatoko wishes to be that person badly, but does she have a chance with so many people asking Misaki?
18	"Many Strong Opponents! The National Games of Everyone's Dreams"; Transliteration: "Kyoteki ga ippai! Akogare no zenkokutaikai" (Japanese: 強敵がいっぱい! あこがれの全国大会)	July 29, 2001
The Nationals are here, and Misaki and Hatoko get a chance to see Athena, the white Angel that inspired Misaki to play Angelic Layer. With this bit of inspiration under her belt, both girls are ready to take on the National Tournament by storm.
19	"System down! Decisive Fight on a Ship in a Storm!"; Transliteration: "Shisutemu Daun!? Arashi no senjō kessen!" (Japanese: システムダウン!? 嵐の船上決戦!)	August 5, 2001
For Misaki and Hikaru's first match, they must battle against Chitose Tanaka and her Angel Elain; Chitose is taller than most girls, as is her Angel, and she feels self-conscious about it, and is angry at Misaki, feeling that she is getting all the breaks because she is so small. A storm brews outside, and coupled with Elain's space-warping Hexigonal Revision technique, threatens to short out the Layer right from under both Angels.
20	"Is Icchan the Enemy? The Puzzling Second Game!"; Transliteration: "Teki wa Icchan? Tomadoi no nikaisen!" (Japanese: 敵はいっちゃん? 戸惑いの二回戦!)	August 12, 2001
An exhibition game for a new Angel model is launched during the Tournament and Hikaru is the one who must fight her. But with Hatoko falling ill, Oujiro steps in to take over, but the shocks do not end there as Misaki discovers Icchan's true identity. Can she focus in time to win the match? Or is Hikaru no match for the new model's sharper movements?
21	"Summertime at the Sea! Someone is in Love With Someone!"; Transliteration: "Natsu no umi! Dareka ga dareka ni koishiteru" (Japanese: 夏の海! 誰かが誰かに恋してる)	August 19, 2001
Summer break lands Misaki and her friends at the beach where they run into Icchan and his friends. Misaki and Oujiro spend time together as Tamayo finally admits her true feelings to Kotaro.
22	"Suddenly Just the Two of Us, Secret Double Dates"; Transliteration: "Totsuzen no futarikiri Himitsu no daburu dēto" (Japanese: 突然の二人きり 秘密のダブルデート)	August 26, 2001
After looking over Ohjiro's doll Wizard's data, Misaki finds herself meeting up with Oujiro, who spends time with her that day in what appears to be a date. At the same time, Tamayo and Kotaro find themselves trapped in an elevator together. Can they sort out their feelings? Or is this a friendship lost?
23	"Break Up the Magic Wall! Misaki Versus Ohjiro"; Transliteration: "Maho no kabe o yabure! Misaki VS Ōjirō" (Japanese: 魔法の壁を破れ! みさきVS王二郎)	September 2, 2001
The National Semis are here and it's Hikaru vs. Wizard. His Magic Guard seems impenetrable and Hikaru cannot get a hit in edgewise. It is going to take all of Misaki's skill to get her Angel out of this one as Oujiro struggles with his own feelings about Misaki and his first love: her mother.
24	"Reach Misaki! This Thought Goes Over the Rainbow!"; Transliteration: "Misaki ni todoke! Kono omoi niji o koete" (Japanese: みさきに届け!この想い虹を越えて)	September 9, 2001
Icchan takes Shuko to an amusement park to try and sort out his feelings, and afterwards the match between Shirahime and Athena, but Shuko is having mixed feelings on whether she should win or not because if she does she will have to face Misaki. Will Shuko decide to overcome her fear and face Misaki or will she throw the match and keep running away?
25	"Reunion of Destiny, Angels Wet With Tears"; Transliteration: "Unmei no saikai Namida ni nureta enjeru" (Japanese: 運命の再会 涙に濡れたエンジェル)	September 16, 2001
Upset and confused about the fact that Shu is really her mother Misaki runs away. Shuko desperately tries to find her daughter but even if she does will they be able to work things out and have the mother-daughter relationship they both desperately want, or will they be unable to understand each other and grow even further apart?
26	"Angel Wings! Please Guide Me & Hikaru!"; Transliteration: "Tenshi no tsubasa yo! Watashi to Hikaru o izanatte" (Japanese: 天使の翼よ! 私とヒカルをいざなって)	September 23, 2001
It's finally time for ultimate battle of Athena vs Hikaru, Mother vs Daughter. Who will claim victory in this epic battle of the ages?

== Home video releases ==
=== Japanese-language releases ===
Japanese-language releases
Vol.	Episodes	Release date
1	1–2	July 25, 2001
2	3–5	August 29, 2001
3	6–8	September 29, 2001
4	9–11	October 31, 2001
5	12–14	November 28, 2001
6	15–17	December 27, 2001
7	18–20	January 30, 2002
8	21–23	February 27, 2002
9	24–26	March 27, 2002
DVD box set	1–26	March 3, 2004
Blu-ray box set	1–26	September 24, 2004

=== English-language releases by ADV Films ===
Japanese-language releases
Volume	Episodes	North American release date	United Kingdom release date	References
1	1–4	October 14, 2003	April 19, 2004	
2	5–8	November 25, 2003	June 21, 2004	
3	9–12	January 6, 2004	August 16, 2004	
4	13–16	February 17, 2004	October 18, 2004	
5	17–20	March 30, 2004	December 20, 2004	
6	21–23	May 11, 2004	February 21, 2005	
7	24–26	June 22, 2004	April 18, 2005	
DVD box set	1–26	September 27, 2005	February 9, 2009	

=== English-language Blu-Ray releases ===
Japanese-language releases
Volume	Episodes	Region A by Sentai Filmworks	Region B by Anime Ltd.
box set	1–26	December 13, 2016	September 24, 2018
