= Glass Maiden =

Japanese anime television series

- Screenshot of the logo from the animated series

クリスタル ブレイズ (Crystal Blaze)
- Genre: Mystery
- Anime television series
- Directed by: Mitsuko Kase
- Written by: Atsuhiro Tomioka
- Music by: Ryo Sakai
- Studio: Studio Fantasia
- Licensed by: NA: Maiden Japan
- Original network: Chiba TV, KBS Kyoto, KIDS STATION, Sun TV, Tokyo MX TV, TV Aichi, TV Kanagawa, TV Saitama
- Original run: April 8, 2008 – June 24, 2008
- Episodes: 12

Glass Maiden (クリスタル ブレイズ; original title Crystal Blaze, romanized as Kurisutaru bureizu) is a half-hour anime series directed by Mitsuko Kase. It was broadcast on Chiba TV, KBS Kyoto, KIDS STATION, Sun TV, Tokyo MX TV, TV Aichi, TV Kanagawa, and TV Saitama.

== Story ==
The story follows a group of eclectic characters who form a detective agency. The plot centers around the protection of a humanoid character introduced as "cargo".

"Cargo" is later revealed to be a survivor and escapee from an experiment that attempted to change female human beings into genetically engineered weapons called the HW series, which were intended to be used by the military. This contrasted with the earlier BW series weapons, which were glass-based. These caused targets to briefly become glass, then burst into flames.

== Characters ==
=== The Detectives ===
Shuu (シュウ, Shū)
Voiced by: Shin-ichiro Miki
The main protagonist of the story and boss of the detective agency. Often portrayed as a ladies' man, with a brooding and enigmatic personality
Akira (アキラ)
Voiced by: Yuji Ueda
Shū's younger brother, often addressed by the nickname "Chi-Boss", given to him by Manami and Ayaka. His role is to find jobs for the agency.
Manami (マナミ)
Voiced by: Satomi Arai
One of two girls who work for the agency. Often portrayed as boisterous and unkempt, serving as comic relief or the foil in most episodes.
Ayaka (アヤカ)
Voiced by: Mikako Takahashi
The other girl in the detective agency. Compared to Manami, she is quieter and possesses better manners. She is often seen working with her computer.
Porilyn (ポリリン, Poririn)
Voiced by: Seiji Rokkaku
An effeminate man who acts as either mediator or customer for more difficult jobs that the agency takes on. Monitors several surveillance cameras spread throughout the city to do his job.
Doc (先生, sensei)
Voiced by: Eiji Maruyama
A notably perverted doctor. He often takes photos of his assistant, Monica, in different cosplay costumes. His motto is, "Without lust, humans are nothing."
Monica (モニカ, Monika)
Voiced by: Miki Ito
The assistant/nurse to Doc. She accommodates and enjoys the doctor's fetish for cosplay and inappropriate touching.

=== The Glass Maidens ===
Sara (サラ) (HW-9)
Voiced by: Yu Kobayashi
The "cargo" who was supposed to be allowed to escape. Her average temperature is around 40 degrees celsius. She is currently being pursued by an unknown group of women. She hates her designation (HW-9) and has adopted the name "Sara", given to her by Manami. Her name Sara is derived from the town's name, which means freedom. Sara also means "silky" in Japanese.
BW-Alpha
(nonspeaking character)
A quiet girl who hides her true form. She is later revealed to be fierce and dangerous.

=== Supporting characters ===
Seiji
Voiced by:
A guitarist who works part-time at a restaurant. Also, a friend of Manami and Yuko.

=== The Antagonists ===
Kito (キトー, Kitō)
Voiced by: Norihiro Inoue
The main antagonist and the known leader of the organization who conducts the experiments for both the BW and HW series.
Kyrie (キリエ, Kirie)
Voiced by: Miyuki Sawashiro

== Theme song ==
Opening theme:

1. "Never looking back ~Sukitooru Kokoro de 「Never looking back 〜透き通る心で」" by Rie

Ending theme:

1. "qué sera-sera" by TASO (episodes 1–8)
2. "Kokoroyo Kaze ni Nare 「こころよ 風になれ」" by TASO (episodes 9–12)

=== Episodes ===
No.	Title	Original release date
1	"Episode 1"	April 8, 2008
Porilyn contacts Akira regarding a new job for Shu who is unfortunately nowhere to be found. Manami jumps on the opportunity to prove her worth as a detective and forces her friend Ayaka to come with her. They find themselves in hot water as the cargo turns out to be a naked female actively being chased by a group of dangerous-looking women. Gunfire erupts between the opposing parties and Manami becomes petrified with the scene unfolding in front of her. Her life is placed in great danger, but Shu arrives just in time. Shu then escapes with the mysterious woman, creating a diversion for Manami and Ayaka to escape. After Shu and the girl have gotten away from their pursuers, the group is reunited with the arrival of Porilyn, Akira, Manami and Ayaka.
2	"Episode 2"	April 15, 2008
Having gotten away from the pursuers the mysterious woman, Shu, Akira, Manami, and Ayaka make their way to the hospital. The mysterious woman is then hospitalized because of a high fever. One of the clients from the local government is captured and killed by the insane doctor Kito. The mysterious woman then leaves her hospital room in order to protect her saviors from any trouble. Minami and Ayaka find her and then they encounter the pursuers. Q-Chan runs to protect the girls but is stopped in his tracks when one of the pursuers pulls out a gun forcing Akira to call him back. Shu comes for assistants and the pursuers are told to retreat for now. Ayaka gives the mysterious woman the name Sara which is derived from the town name Massara.
3	"Episode 3"	April 22, 2008
4	"Episode 4"	April 29, 2008
5	"Episode 5"	May 6, 2008
6	"Episode 6"	May 13, 2008
7	"Episode 7"	May 20, 2008
8	"Episode 8"	May 27, 2008
9	"Episode 9"	June 3, 2008
10	"Episode 10"	June 10, 2008
11	"Episode 11"	June 17, 2008
12	"Episode 12"	June 24, 2008

== Reception ==
IGN said the supporting characters are "a lot of fun" but criticized the direction during fast-paced scenes and the stereotypical portrayal of a gay character. Anime News Network didn't like the character designs and called the show unmemorable. THEM Anime Reviews wrote: "[...] I don't hate the show - I found the majority of the content is passable - but the show really doesn't have a reason to exist. [...]"
