= The Gentlemen's Alliance Cross =

Japanese manga series by Arina Tanemura

- The Gentlemen Alliance Cross
- Volume 1 of Viz's English release

紳士同盟† (Shinshi Dōmei)
- Genre: Drama, comedy
- Manga
- Written by: Arina Tanemura
- Published by: Shueisha
- English publisher: AUS: Madman Entertainment; NA: Viz Media; UK: Viz Media
- Imprint: Ribon Mascot Comics
- Magazine: Ribon
- Original run: September 2004 – June 2008
- Volumes: 11
- icon

The Gentlemen's Alliance Cross (紳士同盟†, Shinshi Dōmei) is a Japanese shōjo manga series written and illustrated by Arina Tanemura. The Gentlemen's Alliance Cross premiered in the September 2004 issue of Ribon, running until the June 2008 issue. The 47 chapters were collected and published in 11 tankōbon volumes by Shueisha. The series is licensed for English language release in North America by Viz Media which published the first volume on March 6, 2007. The eleventh and final volume was released in English in April 2010. In this fictional work, a fifteen-year-old student was sold by her father to another family.

== Plot ==
Haine Otomiya, a fifteen-year-old high school student at the elite private Imperial Academy (帝国学園 Teikoku Gakuen), was apparently sold to the Otomiya family by her father, Kazuhito Kamiya, for 50 million yen. Disoriented with her place in life, she became a gang member until she met Shizumasa Tōgū, who told her to live life how she wanted to. Recognizing Shizumasa as the author of a treasured picture book given to her by her father, Haine reformed herself and entered the Imperial Academy to try and win his love.

However, Shizumasa is the Emperor of the school, the sole Gold rank student as the admired President of the Student Council. Through various circumstances, the Bronze-ranked Haine is tricked into becoming Shizumasa's bodyguard and assigned the special rank of Platinum - which designates her as the Koutei's companion. To Haine's surprise and disappointment, Shizumasa claims not to know her and acts coldly toward her. Still determined to win his love, she soon learns that the Koutei is not Shizumasa, but his twin brother Takanari. In the brothers' childhood, Shizumasa won the right to be recognized as the heir to the prestigious Tōgū family, which left Takanari to become his brother's "shadow" and was reported to have died. Because Shizumasa is sickly, Takanari is forced to assume Shizumasa's identity and reluctantly falls in love with Haine. Their relationship is strained by Haine's uncertainty as to whether she loves Shizumasa, whose kind words saved her during her darkest crisis of identity, or Takanari, who is revealed to be the author of her beloved storybook. In the end, she decides to marry Takanari.

== Characters ==
=== Student Council ===
Haine Otomiya (乙宮 灰音, Otomiya Haine)
Voiced by: Hōko Kuwashima
Haine is a fifteen-year-old student at the Imperial Academy who is enlisted to become the bodyguard of the student council president and given the platinum ranking. Haine was born to the Kamiya family but was adopted into the Otomiya family when she was ten years old for ¥50 million. Out of disillusionment with her new step-family, Haine became a delinquent in Grade 9 under the nickname "Seashore Cinderella." However, Shizumasa inspires her to change her ways. Tanemura stated that she picked the character for "ash" in her name as a reference to Cinderella.
Takanari Togu (東宮 高成, Tōgū Takanari)
Voiced by: Junichi Suwabe
Takanari is a student at the Imperial Academy and the emperor of the student council. He is cold and distant, but becomes more kind and falls in love with Haine after meeting her.
Shizumasa Togu (東宮 閑雅, Tōgū Shizumasa)
Shizumasa is a student at the Imperial Academy and the emperor of the student council. He has suffered leukemia from a young age, and his older twin brother, Takanari, is forced to make public appearances under his identity.
Ushio Amamiya (天宮 潮, Amamiya Ushio)
Voiced by: Yui Horie
Ushio is Haine's best friend. Despite finding boys repulsive, she is popular with them and given the nickname Your Hydrangea (紫陽花の君, Ajisai no Kimi). Having known Haine since their delinquent days, she is over-protective of her and joins the student council as their secretary to be with her. Ushio is in love with Haine, but soon realizes that the only reason why she was attached to her was because she did not think anyone else would accept her. However, when Senri does so, she discovers that she has fallen in love with him.
Yoshitaka "Maora" Ichinomiya (一ノ宮 由貴, Ichinomiya "Maora" Yoshitaka)
Voiced by: Arina Tanemura
Yoshitaka is the treasurer and brains of the Student Council. Maora is actually a male, his real name being Yoshitaka Ichinomiya, and is childhood friends with Maguri. He is secretly the Postman (郵便屋さん, Yūbinya-san) of the Imperial Academy.
Maguri Tsujimiya (辻宮 真栗, Tsujimiya Maguri)
Voiced by: Kenji Nojima
The vice president of the Student Council and Takanari's best friend.

=== Other families ===
Itsuki Otomiya (乙宮 樹, Otomiya Itsuki)
Itsuki is the former Emperor of the student council and former secret boyfriend of Maika. Haine's real father.
Ryouka Otomiya (乙宮 緑香, Otomiya Ryōka)
Ryouka is Itsuki's wife who claims to have fallen in love with him at first sight. Before her marriage to Itsuki, Ryouka had already been married and had a son, Kusame, though her first husband is now deceased. She is a cheerful woman who likes to tease both her son and Haine.
Kusame Otomiya (乙宮 草芽, Otomiya Kusame)
Haine's stepbrother and Itsuki's stepson, Kusame is the heir to the Otomiya family. Secretly in love with Haine. Kusame is an honor student and vice president of the Imperial Academy Junior section's Student Council.
Kazuhito Kamiya (香宮 和仁, Kamiya Kazuhito)
Kazuhito is married to Maika, Haine's mother. Kazuhito was originally the Vice Chairman of the Student Council when he was at the Imperial Academy while Itsuki was the Emperor.
Maika Kamiya (香宮 舞加, Kamiya Maika)
Maika is married to Kazuhito and mother to Haine, Komaki, and Tachibana. Originally the secret girlfriend of Itsuki Otomiya.
Komaki Kamiya (香宮 小牧, Kamiya Komaki)
Komaki is Haine's biological little sister from the Kamiya family. She posed as Takanari ("Shizumasa") Tōgū's fiancée to protect Haine from being sent back to their father. Though proper and lady-like, she tends to have her moments of outburst.
Tachibana Kamiya (香宮 橘, Kamiya Tachibana)
Tachibana is Haine's biological little brother.
Shouka Togu (東宮 抄花, Tōgū Shōka)
Shouka is the biological mother of Shizumasa and Takanari.
Kasuga Togu (東宮 春日, Tōgū Kasuga)
Kasuga is, surprisingly, Takanari and Shizumasa's cousin. She is a member of Haine's old gang (Dark Mermaid), and she admitted that she was the most disappointed when Haine left.
Kyouka Togu (東宮 莢果, Tōgū Kyōka)
Shizumasa and Takanari's mother, the older identical twin sister of their biological mother, Shouka. Kyouka is apparently away on business on a frequent basis, so neither Takanari or Shizumasa see her often.
Touya (十夜)
Takanari's servant and one of his best friends. Takanari once said that Touya is "the only person who understands me." He has a calm nature, and cares much about Takanari's happiness. He is polite and is friends with Riiko, but gets nervous easily.
Kiriaki (桐彬)
Caretaker of the real Shizumasa.
Senri Narimiya (成宮 千里, Narimiya Senri)
Voiced by: Tomohiro Tsuboi
The school physician, who loves cute high school girls. He is a butler of the Tōgū family and is especially interested in Ushio, which in later chapters he says is because she looks exactly like Shouka.

=== School staff ===
Strahl Tachimiya III (Shutorāru Tachimiya Sensei)
Voiced by: Noriaki Sugiyama
The warden and principal at Imperial Academy, and a friend of Haine and the Postman.

== Media ==
=== Manga ===
Written and illustrated by Arina Tanemura, The Gentlemen's Alliance Cross premiered in the September 2004 issue of Ribon where it ran for 47 chapters until its end in the June 2008 issue. The individual chapters were collected and published in 11 tankōbon volumes by Shueisha. Tanemura had named the series after the song "Shinshi Dōmei" by Hiroko Yakushimaru but added the word "cross" at the end.

The series is licensed for English language release in North America by Viz Media which published the first volume on March 6, 2007; eleven volumes have been released as of April 2010. It is licensed in France by Kana.

Starting in June 2015, The Gentlemen's Alliance Cross was reprinted in seven bunkoban volumes with new covers.

No.	Original release date	Original ISBN	English release date	English ISBN
1	February 15, 2005	978-4-08-856590-3	March 6, 2007	978-1-4215-1183-2
2	July 15, 2005	978-4-08-856623-8	June 5, 2007	978-1-4215-1184-9
3	December 15, 2005	978-4-08-856623-8	September 4, 2007	978-1-4215-1185-6
4	May 15, 2006	978-4-08-856681-8	December 4, 2007	978-1-4215-1186-3
5	September 15, 2006	978-4-08-856703-7	March 4, 2008	978-1-4215-1730-8
6	January 15, 2007	978-4-08-856721-1	June 3, 2008	978-1-4215-1939-5
7	May 15, 2007	978-4-088-56741-9	September 2, 2008	978-1-4215-1973-9
8	September 14, 2007	978-4-08-856767-9	December 2, 2008	978-1-4215-2257-9
9	January 15, 2008	978-4-08-856793-8	March 3, 2009	978-1-4215-2596-9
10	May 15, 2008	978-4-08856812-6	October 6, 2009	978-1-4215-3076-5
11	November 14, 2008	978-4-08-856849-2	April 6, 2010	978-1-4215-3163-2

==== Dōjinshi ====
Under the pseudonym "Meguro Teikoku", Tanemura has also self-published unofficial dōjinshi of the series and sold limited copies exclusively at Comiket in December 2014.

No.	Title	Japanese release date	Japanese ISBN
1	The Gentlemen's Alliance Chronicle; Shinshi Dōmei Chronicle (紳士同盟Chronicle)	December 29, 2014	—
Haine goes to wake up Takanari in his room. Maora suddenly says something outrageous to Maguri on their first night as lovers. Ushio is upset since Senri is never there when she wakes up.

=== Artbook ===
In June 2008, Shueisha published an artbook for the series entitled The Gentlemen's Alliance Cross: Arina Tanemura Illust (「紳士同盟クロス」種村有菜イラスト集, Shinshi Dōmei Kurosu: Arina Tanemura Irasuto Shū). In 2009, Viz Media acquired the license for its English language release, and subsequently published the book in November 2009.

=== Drama CD ===
In 2004, Shueisha released drama CD adaptation of the first chapter along with Cactus's Secret, as a mail-order gift in the December 2004 issue of Ribon.

== Reception ==
Several volumes of The Gentlemen's Alliance Cross made the Tohan and Oricon manga charts in Japan: volume 9 placed 7th in the week January 15–21, the regular edition of volume 10 was tenth in the week of May 13–19, and both the regular and special editions of volume 11 were on the list for November 11–17, in 4th place and 27th place respectively (selling 78,895 copies combined). The regular edition of volume 11 stayed on the charts for the next week (November 18–25), but went from 4th to 20th place.

According to Publishers Weekly, Viz Media's English release was the seventh best selling comic in April 2007 and the third volume was the eighth bestseller in October 2007. The series ranked 8th in BookScan's list of top 20 American properties in the third quarter of 2008 and was one of the top 50 manga sellers in the time period from the start of May through the middle of July. The fourth volume of the series sold 1075 copies in December 2007, making it the 96th best-selling graphic novel for that month. Four other volumes each made the top 20 list of graphic novels during the month of release: volume 5 ranked 6 in March 2008, volume 6 ranked number 9 in June 2008, volume 7 ranked 8 in September 2008, and volume 8 was ranked 18th in December 2008. Volume 10 ranked ninth on the New York Times Manga Best Seller List for the week of October 18–24, one week before its official release date of November 3. The final volume of the manga ranked fourth on The New York Times Manga Best Seller list for the week of April 4–10. The Gentlemen's Alliance Cross was ranked 16th in a list of the top 25 Manga Properties of 2008 by ICv2. The series was ranked as the 6th top shōjo property, as well as the 18th overall manga property, in America for the first quarter of 2009.
