= List of works published by Shueisha =

List of works published by Shueisha, including manga, light novels, etc., listed by release date.

== 1950s ==
=== 1956 ===
- Lion Books

=== 1958 ===
- KuriKuri Tōshu
- KuriKuri Tōshu: Puro Yakyū Hen
- Red Mask
- Tama Kyūrō-san

=== 1959 ===
- Blue Jet
- Dangan Tantei
- Hen Maboroshi Mikaduki Maru
- Himalayan Tenhei
- Kondoru Tani no Himitsu
- Maboroshi Zukin
- Mei Inu Tiger
- Shō-tsubu Tengu
- Shōnen Flash
- Shōnen Hawk
- Switch-kun

== 1960s ==
=== 1960 ===
- 20 Seiki no Hīrō
- Akai Alpha
- CQ! Pet 21
- Dokugan Ryū Sanjō
- Hashire! Shiro Bai
- Kappa Senpūji
- Kaitei Sentai
- Kuramatengu
- Mei Inu Rex
- Meiba Flicker
- Nekketsu Kakutasu
- Ōgon Kujaku Shiro
- Rawhide
- Shinsetsu Mitokōmon
- Shōnen No. 1
- Shutter Kozō
- Susume! Donguri
- Tenka Taihei
- Zero no Himitsu

=== 1961 ===
- Hagetan Hōrōki
- Judo Boy
- Jungle no Ōja
- Kuroi Ōkami
- Kyū-chan Ikka
- Mammoth Boy
- Ninja Shiro
- Nippon Shōnen
- Odekono-san Tarō

=== 1962 ===
- Dai-3 no Otoko
- Fighter Takeshi
- George George
- Kuroi Kōya
- Thunder Boy
- Yaji uma Kozō

=== 1963 ===
- Attama Shachō
- Big X
- Chikyū Taisen-tai
- Chi no Ninja
- Fūunji-ken
- Hinomaru-kun
- Keirei! Shinpei-kun
- Marē Byakko-tai
- Moero Minami Jūjisei
- Ō-kun
- Shinobi Yarō
- Shinsengumi
- Shōnen Rocket Butai
- Taihei Haraji
- Tatsu Chinkun
- Zero Zero Shirei

=== 1964 ===
- Can-tarō
- Daisuke 100-dan
- Nippon Kessaku Sentōki Series
- Saikoro Korojo
- Sanada Tsurugi Ryū (Dai 2 Bu)
- Sarutobi Ecchan
- Shinobi Ōkami Hayate
- Shōnen Giants
- Space Ace
- Tekinaka Toppa
- Terebi Kozō Teresuke
- Tonneru-kun
- Yokoyama Kōki no Manga Kyōshitsu

=== 1965 ===
- Fight Kyōdai
- Fūma
- Jiro Kichi
- Jungle King
- Kon Taira-tō
- Nandemo Yarō Akatsuka-kun
- Uchū-sen Red Shāku
- Umi no Ōji Tantan

=== 1966 ===
- Honey Honey no Suteki na Bouken
- Kaitō ½ Mensō
- Kenedeī Kishidan
- Kizō Tengai
- Jungle Prince
- Sally the Witch
- Speed Racer
- Skyers 5
- Tenteko Manyūki
- Yūsei Kamen

=== 1967 ===
- 1·2 Sakusen
- Chibi Futo-kun
- Chikyū 1 Oku 3-Nen
- Chintara Kami-chan
- Donkkinko
- Ganbare Shōnen Giants
- Ganbari Mashō
- Obake no Q-Tarō
- Princess Comet

=== 1968 ===
- Attack No. 1
- Captain Scarlet
- Chichi no Tamashii
- Grand Dolls
- Grand Prix Yarō
- Harenchi Gakuen
- Kaikidai Sakusen
- Kōsoku ESP
- Kujira Daigo
- Life for Sale
- Manga Konto 55-go
- Ninja Hattori-kun
- Ninja Taikōki, Sengoku No. 1
- Ore wa Kamikaze
- Otoko Ippiki Gaki-Daishō
- Otoko no Jōken
- Ryūsei Kyūdan
- Vampire (Dai 2 Bu)

=== 1969 ===
- Dorobō Gakuen
- Kakumeiji Gebara
- Manga Daigaku
- Okusama wa 18-sai

== 1970s ==
=== 1970 ===
- 1970 Tagiri
- Aitsu!
- Akage no Ōkami
- Animal Kyūjō
- Ankoku Rettō
- Akuma-kun
- Arashi! San-biki
- Asu wa Tsukameru ka
- Black Pro Fighter Takeru
- Gen'yaku Seisho
- Guts 4
- Inochi Girigiri
- Jinsei Nishō Ippai
- Jumbo Yarō
- Kajiko
- Kasane
- Keppare! Ōta-Tōshu
- Kirisakareta Seishun
- Kyūsoku 0.25-Byō!
- Manga Drifters
- Namida no Gyakuten Homer
- Nanamaru-Shiki Sentōki
- Nusutto
- Okinawa
- Ore wa Kebatetsu!
- Sennen Ōkoku
- Siberia no Kiba
- The Gutsy Frog
- Toilet Hakase
- Totsugeki Rāmen
- Wakai Arashi
- Worst
- Yoake no Tategami

=== 1971 ===
- 4 Tarō 1 Hime
- Bara no Sakamichi
- Bijomaru
- Black Eagle
- Good-Bye
- Guzuroku Kōshinkyoku
- Head! Kiba
- Ikari no Mound
- Japash
- Key Girl
- Kōya no Shōnen Isamu
- Lion Books II
- Nekketsu-dan
- Ningen no Jōken
- ProWres Sōsamō
- Samurai Giants
- Seishun Saizensen
- Shiroi Heya no Futari
- V no Kuchibue
- Yami no Senshi
- Zūzūshī Yatsu

=== 1972 ===
- Akukamen
- Astro Kyūdan
- Boku no Dōbutsuen Nikki Ueno Dōbutsuen • Nishiyama Toshio Hanseiki
- Captain
- Hop Step
- I Saw It
- Kuso Bōzu Guntetsu
- Lady Snowblood
- Mazinger Z
- Moete Hashire!
- Musashi
- Mysterious
- Ore wa Ryū
- Renshō Yarō
- Shōnen no Kuni
- Sore Ike Jump de Young Oh! Oh!
- Spike No. 1
- The Kicker
- The Rose of Versailles

=== 1973 ===
- Aim for the Ace!
- Barefoot Gen
- Climb Sweeper
- Dream Kamen
- Hai ni Naru Shōnen
- Hōchōnin Ajihei
- Onikko
- Onna Darake
- Outer Lek
- Ōbora Ichidai
- Play Ball
- Sora no Shiro
- Taiyō no Shima
- Wagahai wa Norakō

=== 1974 ===
- Dohazure Tenkaichi
- Goronbo Isha
- Honō no Kyojin
- Kaze! Hana! Tatsu!
- Moero! Benten
- Pink! Punch! Miyabi
- Sukeban Arashi
- Tomodachi Gakuen
- Yōkai Hunter

=== 1975 ===
- 1•2 no Ahho!!
- Circuit no Ōkami
- Dear Brother
- Doberman Deka
- Edokko Tatchan
- Gakuen Yorozuya
- Hana mo Arashi mo
- Kawaii Gambler
- Shin Attack No. 1
- The Window of Orpheus
- Tora no Racer
- Yūjō Gakuen
- Zero no Shirataka

=== 1976 ===
- Akutare Kyojin
- Ankoku Shinwa
- Beranmē Holmes
- Boronbo-sensei
- Blue City
- Condor no Tsubasa
- Cyborg 009
- Hoankan Jō
- Hokuto no Kishi
- Jitsuroku Kyojin-gun Monogatari
- Kochira Katsushika-ku Kameari Kōen-mae Hashutsujo
- Neppū no Tora
- Onsen Boy
- ProWres tai Jūdō
- Satellite no Niji
- Shiroi Senshi Yamato
- Swan
- Tōdai Itchokusen
- Yon-chōme no Kaijin-kun

=== 1977 ===
- Asatarō-den
- Big 1
- Hole in One
- Jambo de Gomennasutte
- Jump Minwa Gekijō
- Kaiki Manatsu no Yawa
- Kōshi Ankoku Den
- Kyojin-tachi no Densetsu
- Ring ni Kakero
- Shiroi Karyūdo
- Susume!! Pirates
- U.F.O.-gari
- Yami no Tōbōi
- Yatchin
- Yūkari no Ki no Moto de

=== 1978 ===
- Bikubiku Nyanko
- Claudine
- Cobra
- Kaitei Poseidon
- Karate Inochi
- Kazoku Dōbutsuen
- Keisatsuken Monogatari Keishichō • Kanshikika Amano Shigeo Funtōki
- Mikoto
- Pinboke Shatta
- Rock 'n Roll Baseball
- Ruse! Ruse!!
- Sawayaka Mantarō
- Watari Kyōshi
- Wonder Island

=== 1979 ===
- Appare Ikka
- Gō Shūto Seishun Nikki Go☆Shoot
- Futari no Derby
- Hanappe Bazooka
- Igano Kabamaru
- Kinnikuman
- Mannen'yuki no Mieru Ie
- Massugu ga Iku
- Nekkyū Suikoden
- Ohayō Mimi-chan
- Rajikon Sensō
- Sasurai Kishidō
- Shiritsu Kiwamemichi Kōkō
- Sky Eagle
- Studio Help
- Tennis Boy
- Tomato, Girl Detective
- Wonder Island 2
- Yasei no Bible

== 1980s ==
=== 1980 ===
- Dr. Slump
- Third Year Funny-face Club

=== 1981 ===
- Captain Tsubasa
- Cat's Eye
- Pola & Roid
- Stop!! Hibari-kun!

=== 1982 ===
- Fūma no Kojirō
- Hetappi Manga Kenkyūjo
- High School! Kimengumi
- Tatakae!! Ramenman
- Mad Matic
- Tokimeki Tonight
- Yūkan Club

=== 1983 ===
- Akira Toriyama's Manga Theater
- Chobit
- Chobit 2
- Fist of the North Star
- Silver Fang -The Shooting Star Gin-
- The Rose of Versailles: Gaiden
- Wing-Man

=== 1984 ===
- Baoh
- Captain Tsubasa Boku wa Misaki Taro
- Dragon Ball
- Eiji

=== 1985 ===
- Blood Reign: Curse of the Yoma
- City Hunter
- Sakigake!! Otokojuku
- Tsuide ni Tonchinkan

=== 1986 ===
- Chibi Maruko-chan
- Saint Seiya

=== 1987 ===
- Jōhō Chishiki Imidas
- JoJo's Bizarre Adventure Part 1: Phantom Blood
- JoJo's Bizarre Adventure Part 2: Battle Tendency
- Papa Told Me
- The Burning Wild Man

=== 1988 ===
- Bastard!!
- Handsome na Kanojo
- Hen
- Riki-Oh
- Rokudenashi Blues
- Shōnen Ashibe

=== 1989 ===
- Chameleon Jail
- Circuit no Ōkami II: Modena no Tsurugi
- Dragon Quest: The Adventure of Dai
- JoJo's Bizarre Adventure Part 3: Stardust Crusaders
- Ten de Shōwaru Cupid

== 1990s ==
=== 1990 ===
- Akira Toriyama: The World
- Akira Toriyama: The World Special
- Amai Seikatsu
- Battle Angel Alita
- Futaba-kun Change!
- Slam Dunk
- YuYu Hakusho

=== 1991 ===
- Akazukin Chacha
- Tenshi Nanka Ja Nai

=== 1992 ===
- Angel Densetsu
- Boys Over Flowers
- Golden Boy
- Hareluya II Boy
- JoJo's Bizarre Adventure Part 4: Diamond Is Unbreakable
- JoJo's Bizarre Adventure Volume 1: Meet Jotaro Kujo
- JoJo's Bizarre Adventure Volume 2: The Death of Avdol
- Shadow Lady (V-Jump)
- Zenki

=== 1993 ===
- Anata to Scandal
- The Brief Return of Dr. Slump
- Captain Tsubasa: Saikyo no teki: Holland Youth
- Go! Go! Ackman
- JoJo's Bizarre Adventure (novel)
- JoJo's Bizarre Adventure Volume 3: The World of Dio
- JoJo6251
- The World of Akira Toriyama: Akira Toriyama Exhibition
- Tottemo! Luckyman
- TOUGH: High School Iron Fist Legend

=== 1994 ===
- A Gentle Breeze in the Village
- Bomber Girl
- Captain Tsubasa: "World Youth" Saga
- Rurouni Kenshin
- Salary Man Kintaro
- Steam Detectives
- Zetman (One-shot)

=== 1995 ===
- Ashen Victor
- Baby Love
- Demon Fighter Kocho
- Dragon Ball Daizenshu: The Complete Illustrations
- Sexy Commando Gaiden
- Shadow Lady (One-shot)
- Shadow Lady (Weekly Shōnen Jump)
- Sora Yori Takaku

=== 1996 ===
- Buzzer Beater
- Dragon Quest Monsters: Akira Toriyama Illustrations
- JoJo's Bizarre Adventure Part 5: Golden Wind
- Rurouni Kenshin Profiles
- Samurai Gun
- Yu-Gi-Oh!

=== 1997 ===
- Agharta
- Barairo no Ashita
- Butsu Zone
- Buzzer Beater
- Clover
- Colorful
- Cowa!
- One Piece
- Seikimatsu Leader den Takeshi!
- Sing "Yesterday" for Me
- Tenjho Tenge
- Thus Spoke Kishibe Rohan

=== 1998 ===
- Alichino
- Aqua Knight
- Crown of Love
- Double House
- Fancy Lala
- Gals!
- Rookies
- Shaman King
- Short-Tempered Melancholic
- The First President of Japan
- Theatrical & TV Anime Yu-Gi-Oh! Super Complete Book
- Ultimate Muscle: The Kinnikuman Legacy
- Whistle!

=== 1999 ===
- Gorgeous Carat
- Hikaru no Go
- Kenshin Kaden
- Real
- Sadamitsu the Destroyer
- St. Dragon Girl
- The Devil Does Exist
- Yu-Gi-Oh! (Novel)
- Yu-Gi-Oh! Official Card Game Duel Monsters Official Card Catalog The Valuable Book
- Zombiepowder.
- Naruto

== 2000s ==
=== 2000 ===
- Animal Yokochō
- Arcana
- Battle Angel Alita: Last Order
- Black Cat
- Captain Tsubasa Millennium Dream
- Gag Manga Biyori
- Gantz
- Happy World!
- JoJo A-Go! Go!
- JoJo's Bizarre Adventure Part 6: Stone Ocean
- Parfait Tic!
- Read or Die
- Read or Die (Manga)
- Ring ni Kakero 2
- Sand Land
- The Summit of the Gods
- Time Stranger Kyoko
- Yu-Gi-Oh! Official Card Game Duel Monsters Official Rule Guide — The Thousand Rule Bible

=== 2001 ===
- Addicted to Curry
- Akatsuki! Otokojuku: Seinen yo, Daishi wo Idake
- Bleach
- Captain Tsubasa: Road to 2002
- Claymore
- ComaGoma
- Diabolo
- Dragon Drive
- Gun Blaze West
- Kinnikuman Nisei: All Chōjin Dai-Shingeki
- Le Bizzarre Avventure di GioGio II: Golden Heart/Golden Ring
- Skyhigh
- Ultra Maniac
- Violence Jack: Sengoku Majinden

=== 2002 ===
- Aishiteruze Baby
- Beet the Vandel Buster
- Captain Tsubasa Final Countdown
- Elfen Lied
- Eyeshield 21
- Hells Angels
- Saint Seiya – Gigantomachia
- Strawberry 100%
- Tail of the Moon
- Tokimeki Midnight
- Yu-Gi-Oh! Character Guidebook: The Gospel of Truth
- Zetman

=== 2003 ===
- Buso Renkin
- Cactus's Secret
- Crimson Hero
- Death Note
- Gin Tama
- Ginban Kaleidoscope
- High School Debut
- Read or Dream
- Real World
- Skyhigh: Karma
- Skyhigh: Shinshō
- St. ♥ Dragon Girl Miracle
- Tenkamusou Edajima Heihachi Den
- Tough

=== 2004 ===
- All You Need Is Kill
- B Gata H Kei
- B.O.D.Y.
- Bartender
- Captain Tsubasa FCRB
- Captain Tsubasa Golden Dream
- D.Gray-man
- Denpa teki na Kanojo
- Funbari Poem
- Girl Friend
- Higepiyo
- JoJo's Bizarre Adventure Part 7: Steel Ball Run
- Kinnikuman Nisei: Kyūkyoku no Chōjin Tag Hen
- Reborn!
- Oton
- Rosario + Vampire
- The Earl and the Fairy
- The Gentlemen's Alliance Cross
- Wāqwāq
- Yu-Gi-Oh! R

=== 2005 ===
- Abara
- Captain Tsubasa: Golden-23
- Gimmick!
- Tatakau Shisho
- Yasuko to Kenji
- Yu-Gi-Oh! GX

=== 2006 ===
- 81diver
- Biomega
- Captain Tsubasa Japan Dream
- Ral Ω Grad
- Switch Girl!!
- Tegami Bachi
- To Love Ru
- Usogui

=== 2007 ===
- A Devil and Her Love Song
- Akikan!
- Crash!
- Dr. Mashirito - Abale-chan
- Dreamin' Sun
- Chocolate Cosmos
- Dragonaut: The Resonance
- Embalming
- First Love Limited
- Katekyō Hitman Reborn! Official Character Book Vongola 77
- Katekyō Hitman Reborn! Sōshūhen: Vongola Family
- Katekyō Hitman Reborn!: Hidden Bullet
- Psyren
- Reibaishi Izuna
- Reinōryokusha Odagiri Kyōko no Uso
- Rosario + Vampire: Season II
- Run with the Wind
- Shiki
- Sket Dance
- Stepping on Roses
- Strobe Edge
- The Book: JoJo's Bizarre Adventure 4th Another Day

=== 2008 ===
- Akikan! (Manga)
- Aozora Yell
- Bakuman
- Ben-To
- Campione!
- Demon Love Spell
- Genkaku Picasso
- Gingitsune
- Good Luck Girl!
- Hayate × Blade
- Karakuri Dôji Ultimo Chapter: 0
- Kinnikuman Lady
- Rosario + Vampire (Novel)
- Rozen Maiden (Weekly Young Jump)
- Rozen Maiden Shinsōban
- Sakura Hime: The Legend of Princess Sakura
- Stardust Wink
- Tatakau Shisho to Koisuru Bakudan
- Toriko
- Yumeiro Patissiere
- Zekkyō Gakkyū

=== 2009 ===
- Anedoki
- Beelzebub
- Berry Dynamite
- Blood Blockade Battlefront
- Blue Exorcist
- Captain Tsubasa In Calcio
- Captain Tsubasa Kaigai Gekito Hen
- Element Hunters
- Gokujyo
- Peach-Pit Art book (Rozen Maiden)
- Sing "Yesterday" for Me EX: Visiting the Origin, Kei Toume Early Short Stories
- SKET DANCE extra dance
- Ultimo
- De-I-Ko! GX
- Yu-Gi-Oh! 5D's

== 2010s ==
=== 2010 ===
- Anyamaru Tantei Kiruminzuu
- Blue Friend
- Captain Tsubasa En La Liga
- Captain Tsubasa Live Together
- Enigma (manga)
- Enma vs: Dororon Enma-kun Gaiden
- Gourmet Academy Toriko
- Heroine Shikkaku
- Hibi Rock
- Psyren: Another Call
- Reborn Colore!
- To Love Ru Darkness
- Yu-Gi-Oh! 10th Anniversary Animation Book
- Yu-Gi-Oh! Zexal

=== 2011 ===
- 87 Clockers
- Amai Seikatsu 2nd Season
- Ao Haru Ride
- Ao Haru Ride (Novel)
- Blank Canvas: My So-Called Artist's Journey
- ChocoTan!
- Cyclops Shōjo Saipu
- Daytime Shooting Star
- Dragon Ball: Episode of Bardock
- Duel Art
- Gate 7
- Hito Hitori Futari
- JoJo's Bizarre Adventure Over Heaven
- JoJo's Bizarre Adventure Part 8: JoJolion
- Prophecy
- Purple Haze Feedback
- Reibaishi Izuna: Ascension
- Rokka: Braves of the Six Flowers
- Shaman King: Zero
- Sugar Soldier
- Supinamarada!
- Taste of the Devil Fruit!!
- Terra Formars
- Tiger & Bunny
- Tokyo Ghoul
- Winners Circle e Yōkoso
- Wolf Girl and Black Prince

=== 2012 ===
- Anohana: The Flower We Saw That Day
- Assassination Classroom
- Barrage
- Beast Saga
- Brynhildr in the Darkness
- Chōsoku Henkei Gyrozetter
- Cross Manage
- Food Wars!: Shokugeki no Soma
- Haikyu!!
- Jorge Joestar
- Like a Butterfly
- Oedo Honey
- R.O.D Rehabilitation
- Rainbow Days
- Robotics;Notes Revival Legacy
- Rokka: Braves of the Six Flowers (Manga)
- Romantica Clock
- Maite wa Ikenai Rozen Maiden
- Rozen Maiden Dolls Talk
- Rurouni Kenshin: Restoration
- Senyu
- Seraph of the End
- Shaman King: Flowers
- Shinmai Fukei Kiruko-san
- Smoking Gun - Minkan Kasōken Chōsa'in Nagareda Midori
- Tanken Driland
- The Disastrous Life of Saiki K.
- Yu-Gi-Oh! D-Team Zexal
- Z/X Zillions of enemy X

=== 2013 ===
- Boku Girl
- Captain Tsubasa: Rising Sun
- Dame na Watashi ni Koishite Kudasai
- Dragon Ball: A Visual History
- ēlDLIVE
- Gaist Crusher
- Gunjō Senki
- Hamatora
- Himouto! Umaru-chan
- JoJoveller
- ReRe Hello
- Rozen Maiden Comic & Anime Official Guide Book
- Scorching Ping Pong Girls
- Tokyo Ghoul [Jack]
- Tokyo Ghoul: Days
- Tsubasa to Hotaru
- Twin Star Exorcists
- World Trigger

=== 2014 ===
- 7thGarden
- All You Need Is Kill (manga)
- Bungo
- Clean Freak! Aoyama-kun
- Golden Kamuy
- Hatena Illusion
- Hinomaru Sumo
- Oshiete! Michelle Kyōkan
- Rozen Maiden Art Book: Rose Maiden
- Rurouni Kenshin: Master of Flame
- School Judgment: Gakkyu Hotei
- selector infected WIXOSS -peeping analyze-
- selector infected WIXOSS: Maya no Oheya
- Serapetit!〜Seraph of the End four-frame manga〜
- Shirokuma Cafe Today's Special
- Steins;Gate: Aishin Meizu no Babel
- Terra for Police
- Terra Formars Gaiden Rain Hard
- Terra Formars wa Oyasumi Desu.
- The Last: Naruto the Movie
- Tokyo Ghoul Zakki
- Tokyo Ghoul: Past
- Tokyo Ghoul: Void
- Tokyo Ghoul:re
- Tonkatsu DJ Agetarō
- Yokai Girls
- Yokokuhan: The Copycat

=== 2015 ===
- 2.43: Seiin Kōkō Danshi Volley-bu
- Ashitaba-san Chi no Mukogurashi
- Black Clover
- Boys Over Flowers Season 2
- Chronos Ruler
- Dragon Ball Super
- Dragon Ball Z: Resurrection 'F'
- Ex-Arm
- Gantz G
- Hero Classroom
- Rifle Is Beautiful
- RWBY
- Ryū wo Tsugu Otoko
- Straighten Up! Welcome to Shika High's Competitive Dance Club
- Taisho Otome Fairy Tale
- Terra Formars Gaiden Asimov
- Terra Formars Gaiden Keiji Onizuka
- Ultramarine Magmell
- Ulysses: Jeanne d'Arc and the Alchemist Knight
- Yokokuhan: The Chaser
- Yu-Gi-Oh! Arc-V
- Yu-Gi-Oh! Arc-V: Saikyō Duelist Yuya
- Kaguya-Sama: Love is War

=== 2016 ===
- Ace Attorney
- Aharen-san wa Hakarenai
- Akebi's Sailor Uniform
- Akira Toriyama: Dragon Quest Illustrations
- Akuma no Memumemu-chan
- Astra Lost in Space
- Black Tiger
- Black Torch
- Boruto: Naruto Next Generations
- Demon Slayer: Kimetsu no Yaiba
- Fire Punch
- Jumyō o Kaitotte Moratta. Ichinen ni Tsuki, Ichimanen de
- Rozen Maiden 0 -Zero-
- Rurouni Kenshin Side Story: The Ex-Con Ashitaro
- Space Patrol Luluco
- Sundome!! Milky Way
- Terraho-kun
- The Promised Neverland
- Tokyo Ghoul:re: quest
- World's End Harem
- Yuizaki-san wa Nageru!
- Yuuna and the Haunted Hot Springs

=== 2017 ===
- Assassins Pride
- Blue Flag
- Dr. Stone
- Ichigo 100% East Side Story
- Mone-san no Majimesugiru Tsukiaikata
- Play Ball 2
- Rurouni Kenshin: The Hokkaido Arc
- RWBY: Official Manga Anthology
- Sōusei no Onmyōji: SD Nyoritsuryō!!
- Summer Time Rendering
- Super HxEros
- We Never Learn
- Z/X Code reunion

=== 2018 ===
- 2.43: Seiin Kōkō Danshi Volley-bu (manga)
- Act-Age
- Bōkyaku Battery
- Burn the Witch (One-shot)
- Chainsaw Man
- Darling in the Franxx
- Darling in the Franxx!
- Double Decker! Doug & Kirill
- Hell's Paradise: Jigokuraku
- Oyakusoku no Neverland
- Raven of the Inner Palace
- Robot × LaserBeam
- RWBY: The Official Manga
- Shadows House
- Shōwa Otome Otogibanashi
- Soloist in a Cage
- Sōsei no Onmyōji: Tenen Jakko: Nishoku Kokkeiga
- Strike or Gutter
- Teenage Renaissance! David
- The Birds of Death
- Ulysses: Jeanne d'Arc to Hyakunen Sensō no Himitsu
- World's End Harem: Fantasia
- Yakusoku no Neverland: Norman kara no Tegami

=== 2019 ===
- Kiruru Kill Me
- The 100 Girlfriends Who Really, Really, Really, Really, Really Love You
- Agravity Boys
- Bokutachi wa Benkyō ga Dekinai hi Nichijō no Reidai-shū
- Bokutachi wa Benkyō ga Dekinai: Mitaiken no Jikanwari
- Samurai 8: The Tale of Hachimaru
- Shin Sakura Taisen: The Comic
- Spy × Family
- SSSS.Gridman
- 'Tis Time for "Torture," Princess
- Wicked Trapper
- Yakusoku no Neverland: Mama-tachi no Tsuisōkyoku
- Yui Kamio Lets Loose
- 'Susume! Jump Heppoko Tanken-tai!
- Otome no Teikoku
- Oblivion Battery
- Koisuru One Piece
- Chained Soldier
- 2.5 Dimensional Seduction

== 2020s ==
=== 2020 ===
- 200m Saki no Netsu
- Alice-san Chi no Iroribata
- Ayakashi Triangle
- BNA: Brand New Animal
- BNA ZERO Massara ni Narenai Kemono-tachi
- Bone Collection
- Boy's Abyss
- Build King
- Burn the Witch
- Dragon Quest: The Adventure of Dai
- Excuse Me Dentist, It's Touching Me!
- Gantz: E
- Ghost Reaper Girl
- Guardian of the Witch
- Hard-Boiled Cop and Dolphin
- High School Family
- Junket Bank
- Kaiju No. 8
- Kiruru Kill Me
- Kō Iu no ga Ii
- Let's Do It Already!
- Magu-chan: God of Destruction
- Mashle
- Me & Roboco
- Moriking
- Oshi no Ko
- Phantom Seer
- Ron Kamonohashi
- Sakamoto Days
- Sing "Yesterday" for Me afterword
- Stand Up Start
- Sundome!! Milky Way Another End
- There's No Freaking Way I'll be Your Lover! Unless...
- Time Paradox Ghostwriter
- Uchi no Otōto-domo ga Sumimasen
- Uma Musume Cinderella Gray
- Umamusume: Cinderella Gray
- Undead Unluck
- World's End Harem: Britannia Lumiére
- World's End Harem: Fantasia Academy
- Yu-Gi-Oh! SEVENS Luke! Explosive Supremacy Legend!!
- Yu-Gi-Oh! Sevens: Boku no Road Gakuen

=== 2021 ===
- Ayashimon
- Blue Box
- Choujin X
- Dandadan
- Doron Dororon
- DRCL midnight children
- The Elusive Samurai
- Fujiko no Kimyō na Shoseijutsu: Whitesnake no Gosan
- The Hunters Guild: Red Hood
- Look Back
- Psycho-Pass 3: The First Inspector
- Taisho Otome Otogi Banashi: Enseika no Shokutaku
- Takopi's Original Sin
- Tokimeki Tonight Sorekara
- Usogui: Tokubetsu-hen
- Witch Watch
- Zombie Land Saga Gaiden: The First Zombie

=== 2022 ===
- Akane-banashi
- Ban-Ō
- Batsu Hare
- Bubble
- Catenaccio
- Gokurakugai
- Goodbye, Eri
- Hōkago Himitsu Club
- Just Listen to the Song
- Kindergarten Wars
- My Girlfriend Is 8 Meters Tall
- Red Cat Ramen
- RuriDragon
- Summer Time Rendering 2026: The Room that Dreams of Murder
- You and I Are Polar Opposites

=== 2023 ===
- The Days of Diamond
- Dogsred
- Jiangshi X
- The JoJoLands
- Kagurabachi
- Kill Blue
- Nue's Exorcist

=== 2024 ===
- Ichi the Witch
- Shiba Inu Rooms

== Unsorted ==
- The 100th Love with You
- Captain Tsubasa: All Star Game
- Rickshaw Man

== See also ==
- List of manga published by Shogakukan
- List of manga published by Hakusensha
