= Agartha (disambiguation) =

Agartha (sometimes Agharta, Agartta, Agharti, Agarath, Agarta or Agarttha) is a mythical kingdom that appears in occultist writings.

These terms or variations upon them may also be used to refer to:

- Agharta, a 1975 live album by Miles Davis
- Agharta, a manga series by Takaharu Matsumoto
- Agharta: The Hollow Earth, a 2000 video game
- “Aghartha”, a 2009 song from the Sunn O))) album Monoliths & Dimensions
- "Argatha", a 2015 song from the Sword album High Country
- Agartha, a 2017 album by Vald
- "Agartha", a 2023 composition for flute and electronic sounds by Juan María Solare
- Ergenekon (allegation), a Turkish coup trial also referred to as "Ergenekon/Agartha"
