= List of Addicted to Curry chapters =

Written and illustrated by Kazuki Funatsu, the chapters of the Addicted to Curry series have been in Shueisha's Weekly Young Jump magazine. Since its serialization over four-hundred chapters have been released in Japan. The first volume of Addicted to Curry was released on July 19, 2001 and as of January 18, 2013, forty-nine volumes have been released.

== Volume list ==
No.	Release date	ISBN
01	July 19, 2001	4-08-876181-2
02	October 19, 2001	4-08-876218-5
03	January 18, 2002	4-08-876256-8
04	April 19, 2002	4-08-876282-7
05	July 19, 2002	4-08-876318-1
06	October 18, 2002	4-08-876352-1
07	January 17, 2003	4-08-876389-0
08	May 19, 2003	4-08-876444-7
09	July 18, 2003	4-08-876475-7
10	October 17, 2003	4-08-876507-9
11	January 19, 2004	4-08-876552-4
12	July 16, 2004	4-08-876592-3
13	September 17, 2004	4-08-876676-8
14	November 19, 2004	4-08-876707-1
15	January 19, 2005	4-08-876737-3
16	April 19, 2005	4-08-876784-5
17	July 19, 2005	4-08-876823-X
18	November 18, 2005	4-08-876878-7
19	January 19, 2006	4-08-877027-7
20	April 19, 2006	4-08-877068-4
21	July 19, 2006	4-08-877107-9
22	October 19, 2006	4-08-877155-9
23	January 19, 2007	978-4-08-877195-3
24	April 19, 2007	978-4-08-877246-2
25	July 19, 2007	978-4-08-877295-0
26	October 19, 2007	978-4-08-877338-4
27	January 18, 2008	978-4-08-877376-6
28	April 18, 2008	978-4-08-877424-4
29	July 18, 2008	978-4-08-877473-2
30	October 17, 2008	978-4-08-877526-5
31	January 19, 2009	978-4-08-877583-8
32	April 17, 2009	978-4-08-877625-5
33	July 17, 2009	978-4-08-877681-1
34	October 19, 2009	978-4-08-877735-1
35	January 19, 2010	978-4-08-877788-7
36	April 19, 2010	978-4-08-877838-9
37	July 16, 2010	978-4-08-877896-9
38	October 19, 2010	978-4-08-879040-4
39	January 19, 2011	978-4-08-879089-3
40	April 19, 2011	978-4-08-879132-6
41	July 19, 2011	978-4-08-879171-5
