= Dogeza: I Tried Asking While Kowtowing =

Japanese sex comedy manga series

- Volume 1 manga cover

土下座で頼んでみた (Dogeza de Tanondemita)
- Genre: Sex comedy
- Manga
- Written by: Kazuki Funatsu
- Published by: Kadokawa Shoten
- Imprint: MF Comics
- Original run: March 18, 2017 – present
- Volumes: 2
- Light novel
- Written by: Yagi Honjo
- Illustrated by: Kazuki Funatsu
- Published by: Bishoujo Bunko
- Original run: June 18, 2018 – November 16, 2018
- Volumes: 2
- Live-action video
- Studio: Muku
- Released: October 13, 2018
- Runtime: 96 minutes
- Anime television series
- Directed by: Shinpei Nagai
- Music by: no_my
- Studio: Adonero
- Licensed by: Crunchyroll
- Original network: AT-X
- Original run: October 14, 2020 – December 30, 2020
- Episodes: 12 + 1 OVA

Dogeza: I Tried Asking While Kowtowing (Japanese: 土下座で頼んでみた, Hepburn: Dogeza de Tanondemita; "I Tried Asking While Kowtowing") (Note: The kowtow is a Chinese prostrative bow which is distinct from the Japanese dogeza. Both start from a kneeling position, but a kowtow consists of a lowering of one's outstretched arms and head to the ground and their subsequent raising, while the dogeza only consists of lowering oneself to the ground, hands beside head, and holding the position. The term "kowtowing" is invoked in the Crunchyroll translation as an analogy; the Japanese title only uses dogeza.) is a Japanese sex comedy manga series created by Kazuki Funatsu. It was originally published as a webcomic through Funatsu's Twitter account starting in March 2017, and has since been published by Kadokawa Shoten in two collected tankōbon volumes. A two-part novelization and a live-action adaptation were released in 2018, and an anime television series adaptation by Adonero aired from October to December 2020.

The series follows Suwaru Doge, a man who bows in front of young women while asking to see their underwear or breasts, and focuses on their reactions to him. The webcomic serialization of the manga was popular with readers, while the critical reception varied, praising the visuals but sometimes criticizing the writing.

== Premise ==
Dogeza is a sex comedy, and follows Suwaru Doge (土下 座, Doge Suwaru), a man who performs prostrative bows (dogeza) in front of young women to ask them to show him their underwear or breasts, bowing deeper and deeper until they listen to his request; the women react to his actions with astonishment, embarrassment, and confusion. Doge himself is rarely actually visible, as the series instead focuses on the female cast.

== Production and release ==
The manga is created by Kazuki Funatsu, and was originally published irregularly as a webcomic through Funatsu's Twitter account, starting on March 18, 2017, as a hobby to the side of his main business. Funatsu sold two print collections of chapters at Comic Market in 2017 and 2018, and two compiled tankōbon volumes of the series were released by Kadokawa Shoten between March 30, 2018, and March 29, 2021, under its MF Comics imprint. A Chinese edition was published on August 1, 2019, by Kadokawa Taiwan.

=== Volumes ===
No.	Release date	ISBN
1	March 30, 2018	978-4-04-069692-8
2	March 29, 2021	978-4-04-065423-2

== Related media ==
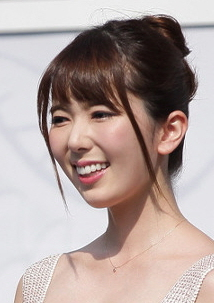
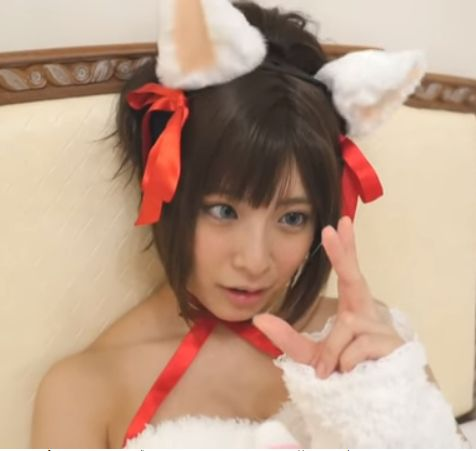
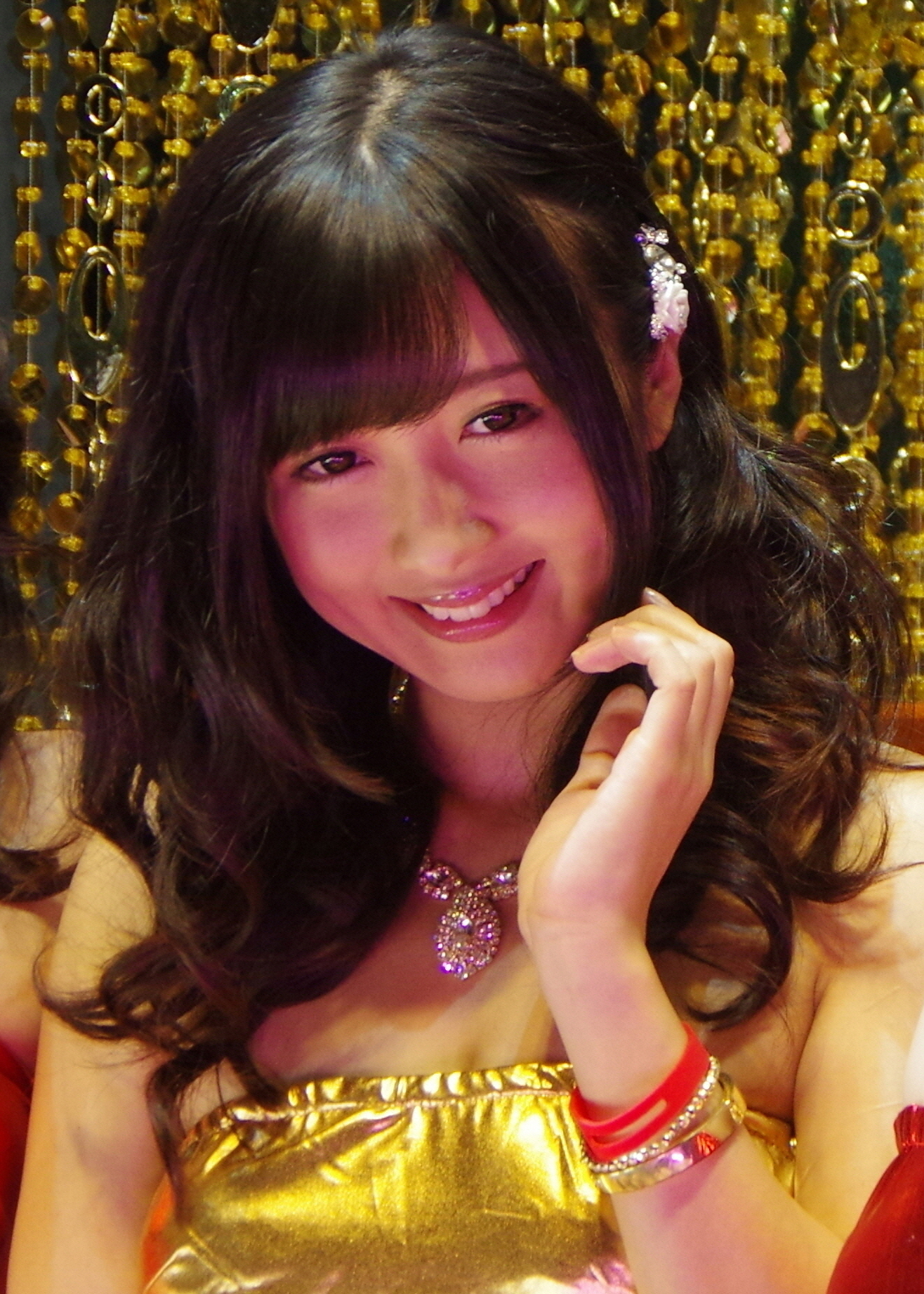
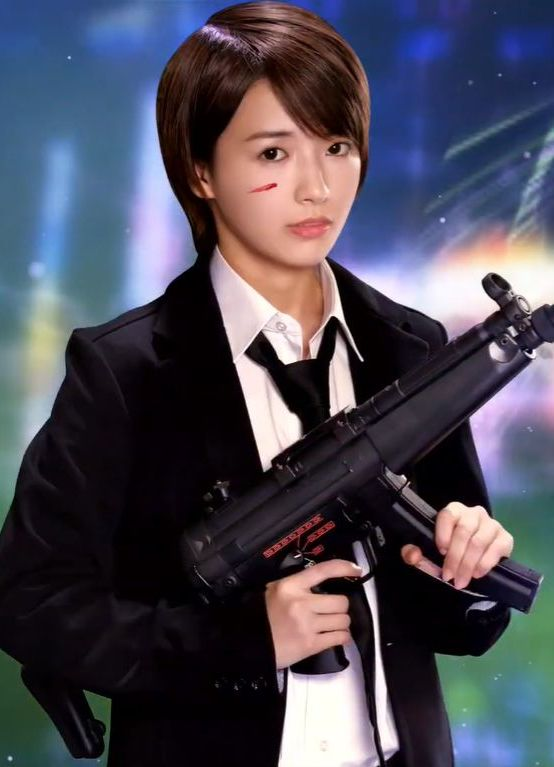
The 2018 live-action adaptation features several actresses including:
Top row: Mari Takasugi, Yui Hatano, Miku Abeno
Bottom row: Hibiki Ōtsuki, Ai Mukai, Aya Miyazaki

A two-part novelization of the series was published by Bishoujo Bunko in 2018: volume 1 on June 18, and volume 2 on November 16. Both were written by Yagi Honjo and illustrated by Funatsu.

An erotic live-action adaptation by the studio Muku was released on October 13, 2018, featuring actresses Minori Kotani, Yui Hatano, Miku Abeno, Seri Hoshi, Mihina Nagai, Yuri Asada, Aya Miyazaki, Hibiki Ōtsuki, Yukari Miyazawa, Mari Takasugi, Ai Mukai, Ruka Kanae, and Nimo.

=== Anime ===
A series of anime shorts adapting the series was produced by Adonero and directed by Shinpei Nagai, with character designs by Harabote, background art by Ami Takasusuki, and color by Akira Nagasaka. The sound was produced at Dax Production and directed by Masakatsu Oomuro, while the music was produced at DMM Music and composed by no_my. Nagai was also in charge of the animatics work for the series. The episodes end with art cards of the characters by various artists: these include Jonsun, Saisou, Unasaka, Kaisen Chuui, Harimoji, Kujo Ichiso, Neibi, Oryou, Yanyo, Sakiyamama, Nishida, and Funatsu.

Funatsu was surprised when approached about the adaptation, and said in July 2020 that he could not believe that it would happen; The Fandom Post commented that it is rare for adult manga to be adapted for a mainstream platform. The anime was announced in July 2020 by Gakken's Megami Magazine, and aired from October 14 to December 30, 2020, on AT-X, and ran for 12 episodes. Crunchyroll streamed the anime with English subtitles. The series was released on Blu-ray on December 23, 2020, in Japan, with the censorship from the broadcast version removed, an additional OVA episode, a soundtrack album, and, depending on retailer, one of a number of illustrations of the female cast showing their breasts or underwear.

The main cast was announced in August 2020, and includes Tomokazu Sugita as Suwaru Doge; Kazuma Horie as the Heavenly Voice; and Yui Ogura, Juri Nagatsuma, Miyu Tomita, Ayaka Shimizu, Saika Kitamori as the female cast, playing 2–3 characters each, while Akane Kaida plays as one. Shimizu and Kaida thought it was exciting to get to act in sexy and embarrassing scenes, and Kitamori liked getting to use her experience with living on Kyushu for one of her characters who speaks with a Hakata dialect. The theme song, "Dogeza! Do Get That", was performed by Ogura, Sugita, Kitamori and Kaida as their characters, credited as the group "Dogeza-tai". This marked Kaida's first time recording a character song, and Kitamori's first time recording music in general; Kitamori enjoyed the opportunity, whereas Kaida expressed a feeling of relief after having finished the recording.

==== Episodes ====
No.	Title	Directed by	Original release date
1	"Now Groveling"; Transliteration: "Dogeza Hajimemashita." (Japanese: 土下座始めました。)	Shinpei Nagai	October 14, 2020
Seen entirely from a first-person perspective, Doge begs a young woman named Minori Gakesaka to let him see her breasts, but she refuses, calling herself flat and uninteresting. Doge praises her breasts while the Heavenly Voice comments on the two's argument, until she eventually relents and embarrassedly shows him her breasts.
2	"Indeterminate Equation"; Transliteration: "Futei Hōteishiki" (Japanese: 不定方程式)	Shinpei Nagai	October 21, 2020
Doge is taking extra classes due to his low grades, and asks his teacher Rui Sukiyabashi to show him her breasts. She tells him that it is because of his breast fixation that his grades are that low, and he gets her to promise to show him her breasts if his grades improve, not believing that he will actually be able to; shocking her, he immediately solves the increasingly complex problems on the chalkboard, and she embarrassedly fulfills her promise, taking off her top and bra.
3	"No Panties? No Problem!"; Transliteration: "Daijōbu! Haitemasenyo!" (Japanese: 大丈夫！履いてませんよ！)	Shinpei Nagai	October 28, 2020
After school in the school nurse's office, Doge meets the health committee member Misenai Kanan and asks her to show him her panties. She teases him about it, but tells him that she cannot because she is not wearing any, lifting her skirt to show off her bare buttock and thighs. While doing so, she accidentally shows a string, revealing that she really is wearing side-tie panties; Doge grabs the string, and her panties start to come off as she panickedly apologizes for lying.
4	"Hardboiled Dogezaland"; Transliteration: "Hādo Boirudo Dogezā Rando" (Japanese: ハードボイルド・ドゲザーランド)	Shinpei Koikawa	November 4, 2020
After school in the library, Doge asks the avid reader Sanami Murakami to show him her breasts. She downplays them, calling them "lubber" and not worth seeing. As they argue, she stands with her back straight to demonstrate, which strains her bra and blouse; this causes them to burst open, baring her breasts.
5	"Hey There!"; Transliteration: "Hai, Konnichiwā" (Japanese: はい、こんにちわー)	Shinpei Nagai	November 11, 2020
Doge meets a childhood friend, Akari Ohsaka, and she is reluctant to talk to him because of the way he stares at her, so he decides to be direct and asks her to show him her panties; she eventually relents after telling him to die.
6	"Can't Become More Honest"; Transliteration: "Sunao ni Narenakute" (Japanese: 素直になれなくて)	Shinpei Nagai	November 18, 2020
Rei Shioya, a calm and collected woman, immediately agrees to show Doge her panties, although does not understand why he would want to see them. This behavior throws him off, and he does not know how to proceed.
7	"Can't Be More Honest"; Transliteration: "Mite Itte・Sono・Zō-san" (Japanese: 見て行って・その・象さん)	Shinpei Nagai	November 25, 2020
Doge meets Tama Kyan in the nurse's office, and asks Tama what kind of panties she wears. When she simply describes them as "normal", Doge wonders what that means and asks to see them. Tama initially agrees to let him look under the skirt, but she changes her mind. Tama's protests come too late, however, and Doge lifts her skirt, revealing she has a penis.
8	"I'm a Baby Now"; Transliteration: "Aka-chan Hajimemashita." (Japanese: 赤ちゃん始めました。)	Shinpei Nagai	December 2, 2020
Doge meets Urara Toyofusa in the school hallway and asks her to show him her breasts, but she refuses, saying breasts are for breastfeeding. He lies on the ground and babbles like a baby until Urara, entranced, sits down by him and bares her breasts.
9	"Heaven or Hell"; Transliteration: "Hebun・oa・Heru" (Japanese: ヘブン・オア・ヘル)	Shinpei Nagai	December 9, 2020
Doge is at the dentist's office where he meets Yua Aneha. When she wonders if he has any resistance to anesthetics, Doge asks if he can see her breasts. After a while, Yua shows them to him while he is sitting in the dentist chair.
10	"How's Work Going?"; Transliteration: "Shinchoku dō Desu ka!" (Japanese: 進捗どうですか！)	Shinpei Nagai	December 16, 2020
Doge is working as an assistant to San'nose Ninose, a manga artist. He tells her that he needs to see her breasts as a reference for the character he is drawing. Annoyed, San'nose shows them to Doge.
11	"Class 4 Hazardous Materials"; Transliteration: "Dai Yonrui Kikenbutsu" (Japanese: 第４類危険物)	Shinpei Nagai	December 23, 2020
While at a gas station, Doge and his father meet the attendant, Natsumi Yuseki. When she is reluctant to bare her breasts, Doge claims that he will buy a ton of gas tickets in order to help her. As such, Natsumi agrees to do it.
12	"She Made Herself My Sister"; Transliteration: "Imōto Hajimeraremashita" (Japanese: 妹始められました)	Shinpei Nagai	December 30, 2020
Doge meets Ayame Omoi and tells her that he wants to see her breasts, which she agrees to do. However, she ends up stabbing him to death. He then reincarnates in another world. After noticing some of the women, who are of various species, Doge decides that he will grovel in this new world.
OVA	"I Reincarnated in Another World and Started Dogeza"; Transliteration: "I sekai ni tensei shite dogeza hajimemashita" (Japanese: 異世界に転生して土下座はじめました)	Shinpei Nagai	January 12, 2021
In the other world, Doge meets an elf who is amazed to see him and explains that long ago, another human arrived in their world and became a hero to her people. He gets bored with her story and asks her to show him her breasts and panties. She reluctantly exposes herself, but she was not wearing underwear, amazing him. She then says it is time for him to slay the demon lord threatening the land, shocking him.

== Reception ==
Although the series was well received in Japan, with its web serialization being popular with readers on Twitter, it was less popular internationally. GNN recommended the series to readers interested in the topic, calling it visually appealing with well done coloring. Comic Book Resources like the series' premise, and wrote that the series makes good use of the manga format, with its first-person perspective.

Anime Anime thought that the format of the anime adaptation worked well, as one can watch several of the short episodes in one sitting, although Comic Book Resources noted that the anime had a hard time adapting the manga's point-of-view presentation. The Fandom Post was critical of the series, calling it "trashy" and full of bad messages, but well animated and having "just stunning" ending artwork for the episodes. They heavily panned episode 8, where Doge pretends to be a baby, as "a whole new level of embarrassing in a big way", but still found it funny to see Kanan turn things on Doge in episode 3, and thought the book talk in the beginning of episode 4 was cute.

== See also ==
- Addicted to Curry, another manga series by the same author
- Sundome!! Milky Way, another manga series by the same author
- Tsutte Tabetai Gal Sawa-san, another manga series by the same author
- Yokai Girls, another manga series by the same author
