= Machimaho =

Japanese manga series

- Machimaho: I Messed Up and Made the Wrong Person Into a Magical Girl!
- Cover of the first volume

間違った子を魔法少女にしてしまった (Machigatta Ko o Mahō Shōjo ni Shiteshimatta)
- Genre: Magical girl; Parody; Yankī
- Manga
- Written by: Souryu
- Published by: Shinchosha
- English publisher: NA: Seven Seas Entertainment
- Imprint: Bunch Comics
- Magazine: Kurage Bunch
- Original run: October 7, 2016 – present
- Volumes: 14

Machimaho: I Messed Up and Made the Wrong Person Into a Magical Girl! (Japanese: 間違った子を魔法少女にしてしまった, Hepburn: Machigatta Ko o Mahō Shōjo ni Shiteshimatta) is a Japanese manga series written and illustrated by Souryu. It has been serialized on Shinchosha's Kurage Bunch website since October 2016; as of October 2026, fourteen volumes have been released. The story, set on modern day Japan follows main protagonist Kayo Majiba, a chain-smoking delinquent highschool girl who was turned into an all-powerful magical girl by a creature named Kyu in her walk to school.

== Publication ==
Written and illustrated by Souryu, the series began serialization on Shinchosha's Kurage Bunch website on October 7, 2016. As of October 2026, the series' individual chapters have been collected into fourteen tankōbon volumes.

In March 2018, Seven Seas Entertainment announced that they licensed the series for English publication.

=== Volume list ===
No.	Original release date	Original ISBN	English release date	English ISBN
1	May 9, 2017	978-4-10-771974-4	October 23, 2018	978-1-62692-933-3
2	September 8, 2017	978-4-10-772006-1	March 12, 2019	978-1-64275-000-3
3	March 9, 2018	978-4-10-772057-3	August 13, 2019	978-1-64275-121-5
4	July 9, 2018	978-4-10-772097-9	December 31, 2019	978-1-64275-744-6
5	December 7, 2018	978-4-10-772141-9	March 24, 2020	978-1-64505-216-6
6	May 9, 2019	978-4-10-772187-7	August 11, 2020	978-1-64505-520-4
7	September 9, 2019	978-4-10-772215-7	January 5, 2021	978-1-64505-947-9
8	April 9, 2020	978-4-10-772273-7	November 2, 2021	978-1-64827-334-6
9	September 9, 2020	978-4-10-772318-5	April 5, 2022	978-1-63858-177-2
10	May 8, 2021	978-4-10-772389-5	May 31, 2022	978-1-63858-270-0
11	January 8, 2022	978-4-10-772463-2	January 10, 2023	978-1-63858-716-3
12	August 8, 2023	978-4-10-772633-9	June 25, 2024	978-1-68579-554-2
13	January 8, 2025	978-4-10-772786-2	October 21, 2025	979-8-89373-278-8
14	October 8, 2026	978-4-10-772993-4	—	—

== Reception ==
Faye Hopper, Amy McNulty, Rebecca Silverman, and Teresa Navarro of Anime News Network praised the artwork, though they had mixed feelings on the story. Silverman and Navarro praised the parody elements, though Navarro felt it was unoriginal compared to similar works. However, they both felt it was overwhelming to read; McNulty and Hopper were more critical, describing the story as "repetitive" and "unpleasant and boring" respectively. Koiwai of Manga News liked the humor, though Koiwai felt it quickly got repetitive. Koiwai also praised the artwork and character designs.

The series ranked sixth on the "Nationwide Bookstore Employees' Recommended Comics" by the Honya Club website in 2018.

The series has 300,000 copies in circulation.

== See also ==
- Kō Iu no ga Ii, another manga series by the same author
