= List of series run in Shōnen Book =

Shōnen Book (Japanese: 少年ブック, Hepburn: Shōnen Bukku; lit. 'Boy Book'), a monthly shōnen manga magazine published by Shueisha, has featured numerous series between its launch in 1958 and its conclusion in 1969. It was known for featuring many popular manga by many popular manga artists. Some found their way into the US in the 1970s, although the magazine remains little known there.

- Manga titles with a shade of light green appeared in the last issue.

== Manga series ==
=== 1950s ===
==== 1958–1959 ====
Shōnen Book had very few series at its commencement because it started as an offshoot of the already successful Omoshiro Book. Shōnen Book is starting to gain more series, as it eases its way into a separate publication.

Manga	First Issue	Last Issue	Creator
Red Mask (レッドマスク)	March 1958 (originally from Omoshiro Book)	March 1960	Kōki Yokoyama
KuriKuri Tōshu (くりくり投手; lit. 'Smooth Pitcher')	April 1958	July 1962	Hiroshi Kaiduka
Tama Kyūrō-san (玉九郎さん; lit. 'Ball Nine-san')	June 1958	June 1960	Hirō Terada
KuriKuri Tōshu: Puro Yakyū Hen (くりくり投手 プロ野球編; lit.)	August 1958	October 1963	Hiroshi Kaiduka
Himalayan Tenhei (ヒマラヤ天兵; lit. 'The Himalayan Heaven Soldier')	January 1959	March 1960	Shōnama Tanashita
Switch-kun (スイッチくん)	March 1959	October 1960	Terumi Fujiki
Hen Maboroshi Mikaduki Maru (変幻三日月丸; lit. 'Varying Vision Lunate Circle')	March 1959	December 1959	Toshihiro Kuni
Mei Inu Tiger (名犬タイガー; lit. 'Fine Dog: Tiger')	June 1959	February 1960	Ariya Enomoto
Blue Jet (ブルージェット)	July 1959	February 1962	Suguru Horie
Shōnen Hawk (少年ホーク; lit. 'Boy Hawk')	September 1959	March 1960	Datsunin Aran
Apollo no Kishi (アポロの騎士; lit. 'Apollo Horseman')	September 1959	August 1960	Katsumi Mashiko
Shō-tsubu Tengu (小つぶ天狗; lit. 'The Small Long-Nosed Goblin')	October 1959	May 1960	Hiroshi Kaiduka
Dangan Tantei (弾丸探偵; lit. 'Bullet Detective')	December 1959	June 1960	Shigeru Kiyama

=== 1960s ===
==== 1960–1964 ====
Shōnen Book finally launched into a new magazine. In addition to the launch, it now has several more series. Like many other manga magazines, it also adds series along the way. Shōnen Book grows with another set of series. Other manga pass and go. The past manga series end, a larger amount appears in the Shōnen Book magazine. The "God of Manga"; Osamu Tezuka gets hired to write and draw a manga for the Shōnen Book anthology, by the name of Shinsengumi.

Manga	First Issue	Last Issue	Creator
Shōnen No. 1 (少年NO.1; lit. 'Boy No. 1')	January 1960	May 1963	Hiroshi Sekiya
Susume! Donguri (すすめ!どんぐり; lit. 'Recommendation! Acorn')	January 1960	August 1960	Chōhei Gezan
Shutter Kozō (シャッター小僧; lit. 'Shutter Boy')	January 1960	May 1960	Toshio Shōji
20 Seiki no Hīrō (20世紀のヒーロー; lit. 'Hero of the 20 Centuries')	January 1960	March 1960	Yuzuru Kume × Shigeru Komatsuzaki
Mei Inu Rex (名犬アレックス; lit. 'Fine Dog: Rex')	March 1960	April 1960	Ariya Enomoto
Akai Alpha (赤いアルファー; lit. 'Red Alpha')	April 1960	August 1960	Roku Asōshō
Tenka Taihei (天下太平; lit. 'The Whole Peaceful Country')	April 1960	December 1960	Rō Ōtomo
Kuramatengu (鞍馬天狗; lit. 'Pommel Horse Heaven')	May 1960	October 1960	Tomohiko Oka × Jirō Daibutsu
Ōgon Kujaku Shiro (黄金孔雀城)	May 1960	December 1960	Michihiko Mishima × Toshio Kitamura
Hashire! Shiro Bai (走れ!白バイ)	June 1960	November 1960	Ippei Kyūsato × Tatsuo Yoshida × Jun Nagata
Kappa Senpūji (カッパ旋風児)	June 1960	August 1960	Toshio Shōji
Dokugan Ryū Sanjō (独眼流参上)	July 1960	December 1960	Kōmyō Suzuki × Shin'ichi Okazawa
Kaitei Sentai (海底戦隊)	August 1960	December 1962	Satoru Ozawa
Shinsetsu Mitokōmon (新説 水戸黄門)	August 1960	November 1960	Misao Hamadai × Yasushihan Kawauchi
CQ! Pet 21 (CQ!ペット21)	September 1960	March 1961	Keiji Hōtani
Zero no Himitsu (ゼロの秘密)	October 1960	April 1961	Noboru Kawasaki × Yukijo Noboru Takahashi
Meiba Flicker (名馬フリッカー)	November 1960	July 1961	Shinji Hama
Nekketsu Kakutasu (熱血カクタス)	November 1960	June 1961	Ariya Enomoto × Jūsan Futaba
Rawhide (ローハイド)	November 1960	June 1961	Shigeru Kiyama
Judo Boy (ジュードウボーイ)	January 1962	March 1963	Ippei Kyūsato × Tatsuo Yoshida × Yutaka Arai
Nippon Shōnen (日本少年)	January 1961	December 1964	Katsumi Mashiko
Hagetan Hōrōki (ハゲタン放浪記)	January 1961	September 1961	Terumi Fujiki
Odekono-san Tarō (おでこの三太朗)	January 1961	September 1961	Rō Ōtomo
Mammoth Boy (マンモス坊や)	April 1961	December 1961	Shunji Sonoyama
Ninja Shiro (忍者城)	April 1961	December 1961	Shinji Hama
Kuroi Ōkami (黒い狼)	August 1961	March 1962	Noboru Kawasaki
Jungle no Ōja (ジャングルの王者)	September 1961	October 1962	Akira Kuji
Kyū-chan Ikka (九ちゃん一家)	September 1961	December 1962	Okaoni Yamane
George George (ジョージジョージ)	December 1962	September 1962	Shōtarō Ishinomori
Kuroi Kōya (黒い荒野)	December 1962	March 1962	Noboru Kawasaki
Kuroi Kōya (黒い荒野)	April 1962	August 1962	Keijirō Nochi × Noboru Kawasaki
Thunder Boy (サンダーボーイ)	April 1962	December 1963	Kōki Yokoyama
Dai-3 no Otoko (第3の男)	April 1962	December 1962	Suguru Horie
Fighter Takeshi (ファイター健)	May 1962	April 1963	Ippei Kyūsato × Tatsuo Yoshida
Yaji uma Kozō (やじ馬小僧)	September 1962	December 1963	Kazuo Maekawa
Shinsengumi (新鮮組)	January 1963	October 1963	Osamu Tezuka
Chikyū Taisen-tai (地球大戦隊)	January 1963	March 1963	Satoru Ozawa
Ō-kun (王くん)	January 1963	August 1963	Akaoni Yamane
Chi no Ninja (血の忍者)	1963 (New Year's special issue)	February 1963	Keijirō Nochi
Shōnen Rocket Butai (少年ロケット部隊)	March 1963	May 1963	Kōki Yokoyama
Moero Minami Jūjisei (燃えろ南十字星)	March 1963	May 1963	Akira Matsumoto
Hinomaru-kun (日の丸くん)	March 1963	September 1963	Rō Ōtomo
Tatsu Chinkun (タッちんくん)	March 1963	September 1963	Masami Kubota
Marē Byakko-tai (マレー白虎隊)	May 1963	December 1963	Ippei Kyūsato
Shinobi Yarō (忍び野郎)	June 1963	March 1964	Noboru Kawasaki
Zero Zero Shirei (ゼロゼロ指令)	September 1963	August 1965	Shōtarō Ishinomori
Taihei Haraji (太平原児)	September 1963	August 1965	Noboru Kawasaki
Keirei! Shinpei-kun (けいれい!しんぺいくん)	September 1963	July 1964	Akaoni • Aōni Yamane
Attama Shachō (アッタマ社長)	September 1963	February 1964	Terumi Fujiki
Big X (ビックX)	November 1963	February 1966	Osamu Tezuka
Fūunji-ken (風雲児ケン; literally: "Lucky Adventure-ken")	November 1963	April 1964	Hiroshi Kaiduka
Can-tarō (カン太朗)	January 1964	April 1965	Fujio Akatsuka
Yokoyama Kōki no Manga Kyōshitsu (横山光輝のマンガ教室)	January 1964	December 1964	Kōki Yokoyama
Shinobi Ōkami Hayate (忍び狼はやて)	April 1964	October 1964	Noboru Kawasaki
Nippon Kessaku Sentōki Series (日本傑作戦闘機シリーズ)	April 1964	November 1964	Sankiya Mochiduki
Daisuke 100-dan (大助100段)	April 1964	November 1964	Hiroshi Kaiduka
Terebi Kozō Teresuke (テレビ小僧テレスケ)	May 1964	December 1964	Shōtarō Ishinomori
Space Ace (宇宙エース)	June 1964	May 1966	Tatsuo Yoshida
Sanada Tsurugi Ryū (Dai 2 Bu) (真田剣流(第2部))	September 1964	May 1965	Sanpei Shirato
Saikoro Korojo (さいころコロ助)	September 1964	July 1965	Katsumi Mashiko
Tonneru-kun (トンネルくん)	October 1964	December 1964	Sanpei Wachi
Shōnen Giants (少年ジャイアンツ)	November 1964	November 1966	Tetsuya Chiba
Tekinaka Toppa (敵中突破)	December 1964	December 1965	Sankiya Mochiduki

==== 1965–1969 ====
Shōnen Book announces more series. A video game of Obake no Q-tarō was released in the States as Chubby Cherub. Shōnen Book closed, and was replaced with the offshoot: Bessatsu Shōnen Jump.

Manga	First Issue	Last Issue	Creator
Jungle King (ジャングル・キング)	January 1965	December 1965	Noboru Kawasaki × Shin'ichi Sekizawa
Fight Kyōdai (ファイト兄弟)	January 1965	December 1966	Hiroshi Kaiduka
Kon Taira-tō (コン平党)	January 1965	March 1966	Kobushi Morita
Uchū-sen Red Shāku (宇宙船レッドシャーク)	April 1965	March 1967	Kōki Yokoyama
Nandemo Yarō Akatsuka-kun (なんでもやろうアカツカくん)	May 1965	December 1965	Fujio Akatsuka
Fūma (風魔)	September 1965	August 1966	Sanpei Shirato
Umi no Ōji Tantan (海の王子タンタン)	September 1965	December 1967	Yukiosu Izumi
Jiro Kichi (ジロキチ)	October 1965	April 1966	Fujiko Fujio
Kenedeī Kishidan (ケネディー騎士団)	January 1966	April 1967	Sankiya Mochiduki
Flying Guben (フライング・ベン)	February 1966	October 1967	Osamu Tezuka
Kaitō ½ Mensō (怪盗½面相)	April 1966	July 1966	Fujio Akatsuka
Kizō Tengai (奇憎天外)	April 1966	July 1967	Kobushi Morita
Tenteko Manyūki (てんてこ漫遊記)	May 1966	December 1966	Akira Fujikawa × Yōhei Yamaji
Mach GoGoGo (マッハGoGoGo)	June 1966	May 1968	Tatsuo Yoshida
Yūsei Kamen (遊星仮面)	July 1966	March 1967	Osamu Kittaka × Nobuo Hitoshi
Skyers 5 (スカイヤーズ5)	September 1966	June 1968	Noboru Kawasaki × Takashi Ishibashi
Jungle Prince (ジャングル・プリンス)	November 1966	June 1967	Jōji Kōnami
Ganbare Shōnen Giants (がんばれ少年ジャイアンツ)	January 1967	February 1968	Tetsuya Chiba
1·2 Sakusen (1・2作戦)	January 1967	January 1968	Hiroshi Kaiduka
Chintara Kami-chan (チンタラ神ちゃん)	January 1967	December 1967	Fujiko Fujio
Ganbari Mashō (ガンバリまショウ)	January 1967	May 1967	Fujio Akatsuka
Obake no Q-tarō (オバケのQ太朗)	April 1967	June 1967	Fujiko Fujio
Chibi Futo-kun (チビ太くん)	June 1967	January 1969	Fujio Akatsuka
Chikyū 1 Oku 3-Nen (地球1億3年)	September 1967	December 1967	Hikari Asahioka
Donkkinko (ドッキンコ)	September 1967	June 1968	Shōtarō Ishinomori
Grand Dolls (グランドール)	January 1968	September 1968	Osamu Tezuka
Captain Scarlet (キャプテン・スカーレット)	January 1968	August 1968	Hikari Asahioka
Manga Daigaku (マンガ大学)	January 1968	February 1968	Osamu Tezuka
Ninja Taikōki, Sengoku No. 1 (忍者太閤記・戦国NO.1)	February 1968	August 1968	Sachio Umemoto × Kazuya Fukumoto
Grand Prix Yarō (グランプリ野郎)	April 1968	April 1969	Kōki Yokoyama
Ninja Hattori-kun (忍者ハットリくん)	April 1968	May 1968	Fujiko Fujio
Tatakae! Mighty Jack (戦え!マイティジャック)	May 1968	December 1968	Yoshihiro Moritō
Kōsoku ESP (光速エスパー)	June 1968	April 1969	Reiji Matsumoto
Ryūsei Kyūdan (流星球団)	October 1968	April 1969	Sachio Umemoto × Kazuya Fukumoto
Vampire (Dai 2 Bu) (バンパイヤ(第2部))	October 1968	April 1969	Osamu Tezuka
Kaikidai Sakusen (怪奇大作戦)	October 1968	March 1969	Jirō Kuwata × Tetsuo Kinjō
Manga Daigaku (マンガ大学)	January 1969	April 1969	Fujio Akatsuka
Chichi no Tamashii (父の魂)	April 1969	April 1969 (continued in Shōnen Jump)	Hiroshi Kaiduka
Harenchi Gakuen (ハレンチ学園)	April 1969	April 1969 (continued in Shōnen Jump)	Gō Nagai
Otoko no Jōken (男の条件)	April 1969	April 1969 (continued in Shōnen Jump)	Noboru Kawasaki × Ikki Kajiwara

== Light novel and monogatari series ==
Shōnen Book, in addition to the manga titles, featured many Light novels and Monogatari (Picture stories).

=== 1950s ===
==== 1959 ====
Light Novel	First Issue	Last Issue	Creator
Shōnen Flash (少年フラッシュ)	August 1959	March 1960	Sōya Yamakawa
Maboroshi Zukin (まぼろし頭巾)	September 1959	February 1960	Kinya Ueki
Kondoru Tani no Himitsu (コンドル谷の秘密)	November 1959	October 1960	Takeo Kakuda × Fumiya Yoshida

=== 1960s ===
==== 1960–1963 ====
Light Novel/Monogatari	First Issue	Last Issue	Creator
Jūgoya Shiro no Oni (十五夜城の鬼)	January 1960	December 1960	Saburō Shibata × Tokutarō Tamai
Ano Kage wo Oe (あの影を追え)	January 1960	December 1960	Jūsan Futaba × Toshio, Kōsei Saitō
Roketto Ryū-chan (ロケット竜ちゃん)	January 1960	June 1960	Rei Kido × Kei Wakana
Kinsei Tankentai (金星探検隊)	April 1960	May 1960	Teīchirō Kawara
Takeshi Gei Hiden (武芸秘伝)	April 1960	August 1960	Tetsutarō Ōba × Hidemi Kobayashi
Taiheiyōsensō Monogatari (太平洋戦争物語)	November 1960	December 1960	Yoshirō Akinaga × Kōichi Heiya
Taiheiyōsensō Monogatari (太平洋戦争物語)	January 1961	March 1962	Yoshirō Akinaga × Shigeru Komatsuzaki
Sengoku Shōnen tō Hoshizora Dōji (戦国少年党 星空童子)	January 1964	August 1964	Torao Tanabe × Kei Wakana
Panda no Mazō (パンダの魔像)	April 1964	November 1964	Takeo Kakuda × Fumiya Yoshida
Rawhide (ローハイド)	July 1964	March 1965	Teruo Sudō × Koku Fujio
Himitsu Kikan Z (秘密機関Z)	January 1965	August 1965	Teruo Sudō × Kōichi Somekawa
Kitakaze Shirō Katsuyaku Series (北風四郎活躍シリーズ)	January 1965	August 1965	Shikahei Minamida × Toshifumi Sakamoto
Taiheiyōsensō Monogatari (Dai 2 Bu) (太平洋戦争物語(第2部))	April 1962	December 1962	Yoshirō Akinaga × Shigeru Komatsuzaki
Kenjū Tenshi (拳銃天使)	September 1965	March 1966	Haruhiko Daiyabu × Hideo Nakamura
Tobiccho Shō Hōshi (とびっちょ小法師)	September 1965	December 1965	Keisan Kurobe × Takashi Minami
Himit Sushirei (秘密指令)	September 1965	December 1965	Shikahei Minamida × Toshifumi Sakamoto
Seibu Kettō Series (西部決闘シリーズ)	September 1965	November 1965	Teruo Sudō × Hiroshi Maruyama
Tamutamu no Bōken (タムタムの冒険)	January 1966	June 1966	Tarō Yamamoto × Shōtarō Ishinomori
Kagaku Sen Sen, Taihei Yōsensō Monogatari (科学戦戦・太平洋戦争物語)	January 1963	August 1963	Yoshirō Akinaga × Shigeru Komatsuzaki
Nippon G7-Gō (日本G7号)	April 1966	May 1967	Saotto Makinichi × Fumiya Yoshida
Nirui Manrui (二塁満塁)	April 1966	August 1966	Hiroshi Sunada × Kei Wakana
Nikumarekko Monogatari (にくまれっこ物語)	July 1966	December 1966	Tarō Yamamoto × Shōtarō Ishinomori
Dainiji Taisen (第二次大戦)	September 1966	December 1966	Tōboku Fujī × Shigeru Komatsuzaki

==== 1964–1968 ====
Light Novel/Monogatari	First Issue	Last Issue	Creator
Chansu Wotsukamō (チャンスをつかもう)	April 1964	June 1965	Tetsuya, Hoka Moroboshi
Shichi Shiki Sentōki (七〇式戦闘機)	June 1965	December 1965	Tōboku Fujī × Shigeru Komatsuzaki
Shichi Shiki Sentōki (Dai 2 Bu) Chōheiki Satan (七〇式戦闘機(第2部)超兵器サターン)	January 1966	May 1966	Tōboku Fujī × Shigeru Komatsuzaki
SF Thriller Series (SFスリラーシリーズ)	January 1966	December 1966	Masami Fukushima
Doryoku Yūjō Shōri (努力 友情 勝利)	April 1966	March 1967 (canceled)	Unknown writer
Skyers 5 (スカイヤーズ5)	September 1966	June 1968	Noboru Kawasaki
SF Monogatari (SF絵物語)	January 1967	June 1967	Masami Fukushima × Kyōtsuna, Hoka Maemura
Ganbare Giants (がんばれジャイアンツ)	January 1967	December 1967	Masanori Ochi × Hideo Nakamura
Susume! Giants (進め!ジャイアンツ)	February 1968	December 1968	Masanori Ochi × Hideo Nakamura
