= Oku-san =

Japanese manga series

- First tankōbon volume cover, featuring Kyōko Okita

おくさん
- Genre: Comedy
- Manga
- Written by: Masakazu Ooi
- Published by: Shōnen Gahōsha
- Magazine: Monthly Young King (2008–2013); Young King OURs GH (2013–2024)
- Original run: December 19, 2008 – September 17, 2024
- Volumes: 22
- icon

Oku-san (おくさん; "Wife") is a Japanese manga series written and illustrated by Masakazu Ooi. It has been serialized in Shōnen Gahōsha's seinen manga magazine Monthly Young King (later Young King OURs GH) from December 2008 to September 2024, with its chapters collected in 22 tankōbon volumes.

== Premise ==
Kyōko Okita, a cheerful and somewhat airheaded 32-year-old woman, moves into Clover Apartments with her husband, Dā-san. Despite six years of marriage, the couple remains deeply affectionate, often amusing their neighbors with their playful dynamic. Kyōko's bust and absentmindedness frequently draw attention, but she easily befriends those around her, including the three sisters next door—Wakaba, Moe, and Kirara Kusaka—and gym companion Haruka Nonomiya. Though her antics sometimes cause minor chaos, her warm personality endears her to the community.

== Publication ==
Written and illustrated by Masakazu Ooi, Oku-san started in Shōnen Gahōsha's seinen manga magazine Monthly Young King on December 19, 2008. The magazine was rebranded as Young King OURs GH starting on August 16, 2013. The series ended after fifteen years on September 17, 2024. Shōnen Gahōsha collected its chapters in 22 individual tankōbon volumes, released from September 18, 2009, to December 16, 2024.

=== Volumes ===
No.	Release date	ISBN
1	September 18, 2009	978-4-7859-3225-1
2	June 20, 2011	978-4-7859-3641-9
3	February 20, 2012	978-4-7859-3787-4
4	September 19, 2012	978-4-7859-3922-9
5	April 19, 2013	978-4-7859-5029-3
6	November 16, 2013	978-4-7859-5164-1
7	May 16, 2014	978-4-7859-5289-1
8	November 17, 2014	978-4-7859-5418-5
9	May 30, 2015	978-4-7859-5560-1
10	January 15, 2016	978-4-7859-5702-5
11	August 16, 2016	978-4-7859-5843-5
12	May 19, 2017	978-4-7859-6013-1
13	February 16, 2018	978-4-7859-6161-9
14	October 16, 2018	978-4-7859-6311-8
15	July 16, 2019	978-4-7859-6470-2
16	May 18, 2020	978-4-7859-6670-6
17	January 16, 2021	978-4-7859-6840-3
18	September 16, 2021	978-4-7859-6994-3
19	May 16, 2022	978-4-7859-7137-3
20	March 15, 2023	978-4-7859-7343-8
21	November 16, 2023	978-4-7859-7533-3
22	December 16, 2024	978-4-7859-7827-3

== See also ==
- Ashitaba-san Chi no Muko Kurashi, another manga series by the same author
