= Tsutte Tabetai Gal Sawa-san =

Japanese manga series

- First tankōbon volume cover

釣って食べたいギャル澤さん (Tsutte Tabetai Gyaru Sawa-san)
- Genre: Comedy; Gourmet
- Manga
- Written by: Kazuki Funatsu
- Published by: Shueisha
- Imprint: Young Jump Comics
- Magazine: Grand Jump
- Original run: June 19, 2024 – present
- Volumes: 7

Tsutte Tabetai Gal Sawa-san (Japanese: 釣って食べたいギャル澤さん, Hepburn: Tsutte Tabetai Gyaru Sawa-san) is a Japanese manga series written and illustrated by Kazuki Funatsu. It began serialization in Shueisha's Grand Jump magazine in June 2024, and has been compiled into seven volumes as of October 2026.

== Plot ==
Hitohiro Tsuruya, a 24-year-old salaryman, is an introvert, having no friends or romantic experience. His main interest is fishing, it being his only respite from work. One day, while fishing, he meets Matsuri Haruzawa, a gyaru who wants to learn how to fish. Although initially reluctant, Hitohiro accepts her request to teach her. Matsuri initially has difficulty fishing but ultimately succeeds, with her dedication and boisterousness leaving an impression on him. Not long after, Matsuri suddenly joins Hitohiro's company, him finding out that she is actually the daughter of the company president.

== Characters ==
Hitohiro Tsuruya (釣谷 一尋, Tsuruya Hitohiro)
A 24-year-old salaryman who works at a printing company called Hall Printing. Having graduated from a third-rate university and having an introverted personality, he has not found much success in life, with fishing as his only escape from reality. As he has no friends and is not close to his colleagues, Matsuri became the first one to engage with him on a regular basis.
Matsuri Haruzawa (春澤 祭, Haruzawa Matsuri)
A 21-year-old gyaru and the daughter of Hall Printing's president. She is new to fishing and grew attached to Hitohiro after he taught her how to fish.

== Development ==
Kazuki Funatsu originally conceived the series as a manga that focused on fishing and cooking, being inspired by his own interest in both activities. The fishing scenes were based on his own experiences, while he would use his dishes as references for the cooking scenes. The idea for a fishing manga came from his editor, who remembered that Funatsu was fond of fishing during his childhood; Funatsu became too busy to regularly engage in the hobby after starting his manga career, him only taking up sea bass fishing during the COVID-19 pandemic.

Funatsu originally considered choosing between having a gyaru and a rich lady as the female lead, with him initially preferring the rich lady angle. Rejected ideas for the series included a plot about a rich lady going fishing with a maid, and a supermarket worker who went fishing together with a bipedal cat. Although he had a mangaka career that spanned over 25 years, it was the first time he worked on a manga that focused on a gyaru character, initially having the impression that gyarus were scary. He came to appreciate them after doing more research for the manga, seeing them as kind.

Funatsu developed Hitohiro as a protagonist who preferred a quiet life over starting debates. He originally intended Matsuri to be the central character, but as the manga continued, Hitohiro became the main driving force behind the story. He initially thought that the manga would only gain popularity among fishing fans. He was surprised to learn through magazine surveys that it had developed a broad fanbase, with some readers being inspired to take up fishing, while it also developed a female fanbase who liked Matsuri.

== Publication ==
Written and illustrated by Kazuki Funatsu, the series began serialization in Shueisha's Grand Jump magazine on June 19, 2024. The first tankōbon volume was released on September 19, 2024; seven volumes have been released as of October 19, 2026.

No.	Release date	ISBN
1	September 19, 2024	978-4-08-893395-5
2	February 18, 2025	978-4-08-893566-9
3	July 17, 2025	978-4-08-893749-6
4	November 19, 2025	978-4-08-893890-5
5	February 19, 2026	978-4-08-894104-2
6	June 18, 2026	978-4-08-894290-2
7	October 19, 2026	978-4-08-894374-9

== Reception ==
The series was ranked 20th in the print category at the 2026 Next Manga Awards.

== See also ==
- Addicted to Curry, another manga series by the same author
- Dogeza: I Tried Asking While Kowtowing, another manga series by the same author
- Sundome!! Milky Way, another manga series by the same author
- Yokai Girls, another manga series by the same author
