= Kō Iu no ga Ii =

Japanese manga series

- First tankōbon volume cover

こういうのがいい
- Genre: Slice of life
- Manga
- Written by: Souryu
- Published by: Shueisha
- Imprint: Young Jump Comics
- Magazine: Young Jump!; Tonari no Young Jump
- Original run: October 16, 2020 – present
- Volumes: 14
- Television drama
- Directed by: Kōichirō Miki
- Written by: Kōichirō Miki
- Music by: Erina Koyama
- Original network: ABC
- Original run: October 30, 2023 – December 18, 2023
- Episodes: 9
- icon

Kō Iu no ga Ii (こういうのがいい; lit. 'This Kind of Thing is Fine') is a Japanese manga series written and illustrated by Souryu. It was initially published as a one-shot in Weekly Young Jump in March 2020. It later began serialization on Shueisha's Young Jump! and Tonari no Young Jump manga websites in October 2020. An 8-episode live-action television drama adaptation aired from October to December 2023.

== Synopsis ==
Motoki and Tomoka are two people who had just left their previous toxic relationships, and after meeting with each other the two decide to be more than friends, but less than lovers.

== Characters ==
Motoki Murata (村田元気, Murata Motoki)
Voiced by: Kengo Kawanishi (vomic)
Portrayed by: Jun Nishiyama
Tomoka Eguchi (江口友香, Eguchi Tomoka)
Voiced by: Hiromi Igarashi (vomic)
Portrayed by: Mirei Tanaka

== Media ==
=== Manga ===
Written and illustrated by Souryu, Kō Iu no ga Ii was initially published as a one-shot in Weekly Young Jump on March 26, 2020. It later began serialization on Shueisha's Young Jump! and Tonari no Young Jump websites on October 16, 2020. Its chapters have been collected into fourteen volumes as of October 2026.

No.	Release date	ISBN
1	May 19, 2021	978-4-08-891887-7
2	December 17, 2021	978-4-08-892168-6
3	June 17, 2022	978-4-08-892334-5
4	December 19, 2022	978-4-08-892497-7
5	June 19, 2023	978-4-08-892731-2
6	July 19, 2023	978-4-08-892749-7
7	November 17, 2023	978-4-08-893051-0
8	May 17, 2024	978-4-08-893297-2
9	November 19, 2024	978-4-08-893468-6
10	May 19, 2025	978-4-08-893634-5
11	October 17, 2025	978-4-08-893817-2
12	November 19, 2025	978-4-08-893892-9
13	May 19, 2026	978-4-08-894176-9
14	October 19, 2026	978-4-08-894398-5

=== Drama ===
On September 16, 2023, a live-action television drama was announced. It stars Jun Nishiyama and Mirei Tanaka in the lead roles and aired on ABC from October 30 to December 18, 2023.

== Reception ==
The series was nominated for the seventh Next Manga Awards in the web manga category in 2021.

The series has 1.3 million copies in circulation as of September 2023.

== See also ==
- Machimaho, another manga series by the same author
