= Agharta: The Hollow Earth =

2000 video game

- Developer: Aniware AB
- Publisher: Egmont Interactive
- Platform: Windows
- Release: 2000
- Genres: Action, adventure

Agharta: The Hollow Earth (Swedish: Agharta: Jordens inre) is a 2000 video game.

== Development ==
A beta for the German dub of the game was released in April 2001.

== Plot ==
Set in 1926, the player is a pilot who is tasked with finding a famous scientist who disappeared while at the North Pole.

== Gameplay ==
Gameplay follows that of a traditional point-and-click adventure title. The player must explore the environment to acquire items, and use them to complete puzzles and advance the story.

== Reception ==
Chris Kellner of DTP Entertainment, which handled the game's German localization, reported its lifetime sales between 10,000 and 50,000 copies in the region.

Gry reviewer Michael Zacharzewski said the game made an important statement to the world that Sweden has a thriving game development industry, something that may have been in question at the time. Thorsten Wiesner of German site Golem thought the game had a good story with a lot of wasted potential. Game Guru praised its soundscape and music. PC Player thought the game design was unimaginative and the puzzles were hollow.
