= Let's Do It Already! =

Japanese manga series

- First tankōbon volume cover

はやくしたいふたり (Hayaku Shitai Futari)
- Genre: Romantic comedy
- Manga
- Written by: Aki Kusaka
- Published by: Shueisha
- English publisher: NA: Viz Media
- Imprint: Margaret Comics
- Magazine: Margaret
- Original run: May 20, 2020 – November 18, 2022
- Volumes: 9

Let's Do It Already! (はやくしたいふたり, Hayaku Shitai Futari) is a Japanese manga series written and illustrated by Aki Kusaka. It was serialized in Shueisha's shōjo manga magazine Margaret from May 2020 to November 2022.

== Synopsis ==
Yuri Hasagawa and Keiichiro Katsuragi met on their daily walks to school, and eventually Yuri confesses her feelings, which Keiichiro reciprocates. However, when she tried to take their relationship further, Keiichiro resists as he is the heir to a prominent political family where physical relationships under the age of 18 are taboo, and he intends to uphold it. He therefore keeps Yuri at arm's length, much to his chagrin. Even though Keiichiro promises to be open to anything when he's a little older, the situation weighs heavily on Yuri, after all, her female classmates have already had sex.

== Publication ==
Written and illustrated by Aki Kusaka, Let's Do It Already! was serialized in Shueisha's shōjo manga magazine Margaret from May 20, 2020, to November 18, 2022. Its chapters were collected into nine tankōbon volumes released from September 25, 2020, to December 23, 2022.

During their panel at New York Comic Con 2023, Viz Media announced that they had licensed the series for English publication.

No.	Original release date	Original ISBN	North American release date	North American ISBN
1	September 25, 2020	978-4-08-844411-6	June 4, 2024	978-1-9747-4690-3
Chapters 1–6
2	December 24, 2020	978-4-08-844419-2	September 3, 2024	978-1-9747-4881-5
Chapters 7–12
3	March 25, 2021	978-4-08-844443-7	December 3, 2024	978-1-9747-4949-2
Chapters 13–18; Bonus
4	July 21, 2021	978-4-08-844511-3	March 4, 2025	978-1-9747-5220-1
Chapters 19–24
5	October 25, 2021	978-4-08-844535-9	June 3, 2025	978-1-9747-5570-7
Chapters 25–30
6	January 25, 2022	978-4-08-844587-8	September 2, 2025	978-1-9747-5806-7
Chapters 31–36
7	April 25, 2022	978-4-08-844594-6	December 2, 2025	978-1-9747-5807-4
Chapters 37–42
8	August 25, 2022	978-4-08-844672-1	March 3, 2026	978-1-9747-6218-7
Chapters 43–48
9	December 23, 2022	978-4-08-844717-9	June 2, 2026	978-1-9747-6402-0
Chapters 49–54; Let's Do It Already! Counseling Room

== Reception ==
In a review for Anime News Network, Rebecca Silverman graded the first volume an overall grade of "B". She praised the story and Kusaka's improvement as a creator, but criticized Yuri's character as a "little too ditzy".
