= Sundome!! Milky Way =

Japanese manga series

- Cover of the first volume

すんどめ!! ミルキーウェイ (Sundome!! Mirukīu Ei)
- Genre: Erotic comedy; Harem; Science fiction
- Manga
- Written by: Kazuki Funatsu
- Published by: Shueisha
- English publisher: NA: Seven Seas Entertainment
- Magazine: Grand Jump
- Original run: June 1, 2016 – November 20, 2019
- Volumes: 9
- Manga

Sundome!! Milky Way Another End
- Written by: Kazuki Funatsu
- Published by: Shueisha
- Magazine: Grand Jump
- Original run: February 26, 2020 – December 22, 2020
- Volumes: 1
- icon

Sundome!! Milky Way (Japanese: すんどめ!! ミルキーウェイ, Hepburn: Sundome!! Mirukīu Ei) is a Japanese manga series written and illustrated by Kazuki Funatsu. It was serialized in Shueisha's seinen manga magazine Grand Jump from June 2016 to November 2019, with its chapters collected in nine tankōbon volumes. An alternate ending, titled Sundome!! Milky Way Another End was serialized in the same magazine from February to December 2020. In North America, the series is licensed for English release by Seven Seas Entertainment.

== Premise ==
Sakura Yoshitake is a salaryman who works for a food company. One day while driving home, he crashes when he sees a UFO and a terrifying alien. He wakes up in his apartment to find a beautiful woman named Lune near him. She says she has fallen in love with him and wants his child. However, whenever she gets embarrassed, like whenever they try to have sex, she loses control of herself and transforms into the terrifying alien, complicating their love life.

== Publication ==
Written and illustrated by Kazuki Funatsu, Sundome!! Milky Way was serialized in Shueisha's seinen manga magazine Grand Jump from June 1, 2016, to November 20, 2019. Shueisha collected its chapters in nine tankōbon volumes, released from July 19, 2017, to February 19, 2020. A sequel, titled Sundome!! Milky Way: Another End (すんどめ!! ミルキーウェイ ANOTHER END, Sundome!! Mirukīu Ei Anazā Endo), was serialized in Grand Jump from February 26 to December 22, 2020. A single volume was released on February 19, 2021.

The series is licensed in North America by Seven Seas Entertainment and published under its Ghost Ship adult imprint.

=== Volumes ===
No.	Original release date	Original ISBN	English release date	English ISBN
1	July 19, 2017	978-4-08-890636-2	August 10, 2021	978-1-64827-590-6
2	November 17, 2017	978-4-08-890793-2	November 2, 2021	978-1-64827-624-8
3	March 19, 2018	978-4-08-890869-4	February 15, 2022	978-1-63858-125-3
4	June 19, 2018	978-4-08-891058-1	May 17, 2022	978-1-63858-262-5
5	October 19, 2018	978-4-08-891120-5	October 4, 2022	978-1-63858-627-2
6	February 19, 2019	978-4-08-891217-2	May 9, 2023	978-1-63858-803-0
7	June 19, 2019	978-4-08-891306-3	August 15, 2023	978-1-63858-971-6
8	October 18, 2019	978-4-08-891394-0	December 19, 2023	978-1-68579-544-3
9	February 19, 2020	978-4-08-891485-5	April 2, 2024	978-1-68579-528-3
10	February 19, 2021	978-4-08-891789-4	July 30, 2024	979-8-88843-675-2

== See also ==
- Addicted to Curry, another manga series by the same author
- Dogeza: I Tried Asking While Kowtowing, another manga series by the same author
- Tsutte Tabetai Gal Sawa-san, another manga series by the same author
- Yokai Girls, another manga series by the same author
