= Yokai Girls =

Japanese manga series

- Cover of the first volume

妖怪少女―モンスガ― (Yōkai Shōjo -Monsuga-)
- Genre: Harem; Romantic comedy; Supernatural
- Manga
- Written by: Kazuki Funatsu
- Published by: Shueisha
- English publisher: NA: Seven Seas Entertainment
- Magazine: Weekly Young Jump
- Original run: March 6, 2014 – June 22, 2017
- Volumes: 14

Yokai Girls (Japanese: 妖怪少女―モンスガ―, Hepburn: Yōkai Shōjo ―Monsuga―) is a Japanese manga series written and illustrated by Kazuki Funatsu. It was serialized in Shueisha's seinen manga magazine Weekly Young Jump from March 2014 to June 2017, with its chapters collected in 14 tankōbon volumes. In North America, the series is licensed for English release by Seven Seas Entertainment.

== Premise ==
Nishizuru Yakki has the ability to see ghosts, which are mostly harmless. Despite this ability, he had never believed in monsters or yokai, until he meets a girl named Rokka who is a yokai, then meets others.

== Publication ==
Yokai Girls, written and illustrated by Kazuki Funatsu, was serialized in Shueisha's seinen manga magazine Weekly Young Jump from March 6, 2014, to June 22, 2017. Shueisha collected its chapters in 14 tankōbon volumes, released from July 18, 2014, to July 17, 2019.

In North America, the series was licensed for English release by Seven Seas Entertainment in April 2017, and started releasing it under its Ghost Ship adult imprint in January 2018.

=== Volumes ===
No.	Original release date	Original ISBN	English release date	English ISBN
1	July 18, 2014	978-4-08-879869-1	January 2, 2018	978-1-947804-02-9
2	October 17, 2014	978-4-08-890030-8	March 6, 2018	978-1-947804-03-6
3	January 19, 2015	978-4-08-890099-5	June 5, 2018	978-1-947804-05-0
4	April 17, 2015	978-4-08-890143-5	September 18, 2018	978-1-947804-13-5
5	July 17, 2015	978-4-08-890228-9	November 6, 2018	978-1-947804-16-6
6	October 19, 2015	978-4-08-890273-9	January 15, 2019	978-1-947804-24-1
7	January 19, 2016	978-4-08-890341-5	April 30, 2019	978-1-947804-32-6
8	April 19, 2016	978-4-08-890390-3	August 6, 2019	978-1-947804-37-1
9	July 19, 2016	978-4-08-890537-2	January 28, 2020	978-1-947804-42-5
10	October 19, 2016	978-4-08-890538-9	May 26, 2020	978-1-947804-47-0
11	January 19, 2017	978-4-08-890575-4	September 29, 2020	978-1-947804-51-7
12	April 19, 2017	978-4-08-890627-0	December 22, 2020	978-1-947804-54-8
13	June 19, 2017	978-4-08-890683-6	April 27, 2021	978-1-947804-57-9
14	July 19, 2017	978-4-08-890703-1	June 15, 2021	978-1-947804-58-6

== See also ==
- Addicted to Curry, another manga series by the same author
- Dogeza: I Tried Asking While Kowtowing, another manga series by the same author
- Sundome!! Milky Way, another manga series by the same author
- Tsutte Tabetai Gal Sawa-san, another manga series by the same author
