= Ashitaba-san Chi no Muko Kurashi =

Japanese manga series

- First tankōbon volume cover

明日葉さんちのムコ暮らし
- Genre: Comedy
- Manga
- Written by: Masakazu Ooi
- Published by: Shueisha
- Magazine: Grand Jump; Grand Jump Premium (epilogue)
- Original run: August 5, 2015 – February 27, 2018
- Volumes: 7
- icon

Ashitaba-san Chi no Muko Kurashi (明日葉さんちのムコ暮らし) is a Japanese manga series written and illustrated by Masakazu Ooi. It was serialized in Shueisha's seinen manga magazine Grand Jump from August 2015 to January 2018, with an epilogue chapter published in Grand Jump Premium.

== Publication ==
Written and illustrated by Masakazu Ooi, Ashitaba-san Chi no Muko Kurashi was serialized in Shueisha's seinen manga magazine Grand Jump from August 5, 2015, to January 4, 2018. An epilogue chapter was published in Grand Jump Premium on February 27, 2018. Shueisha collected its chapters in seven tankōbon volumes, released from January 19, 2016, to April 19, 2018.

=== Volumes ===
No.	Japanese release date	Japanese ISBN
1	January 19, 2016	978-4-08-890351-4
2	April 19, 2016	978-4-08-890406-1
3	September 16, 2016	978-4-08-890505-1
4	January 19, 2017	978-4-08-890584-6
5	May 19, 2017	978-4-08-890650-8
6	October 19, 2017	978-4-08-890749-9
7	April 19, 2018	978-4-08-891007-9

== See also ==
- Oku-san, another manga series by the same author
