= World's End Harem =

Japanese manga series by LINK and Kotaro Shono and its franchise

- First tankōbon volume cover, featuring Mira Suō

終末のハーレム (Shūmatsu no Hāremu)
- Genre: Erotic thriller; Harem; Science fiction
- Manga
- Written by: LINK
- Illustrated by: Kotaro Shono
- Published by: Shueisha
- English publisher: NA: Seven Seas Entertainment
- Imprint: Jump Comics+
- Magazine: Shōnen Jump+
- Original run: May 8, 2016 – May 7, 2023
- Volumes: 18
- Manga parts
- 1. World's End Harem (May 8, 2016 – June 21, 2020, 12 volumes); 2. World's End Harem: After World (May 9, 2021 – May 7, 2023, 6 volumes)
- Anime television series
- Directed by: Yū Nobuta
- Produced by: Noritomo Isogai; Yuuta Kawana; Chiaki Kondou; Hiroko Kurita; Hisanori Numano; Souta Satou; Souta Shiori; Yukiko Shirai; Noriyoshi Uchibayashi
- Written by: Tatsuya Takahashi
- Music by: Shigenobu Ookawa
- Studio: Studio Gokumi; AXsiZ
- Licensed by: Crunchyroll; SA/SEA: Muse Communication
- Original network: Tokyo MX, BS Fuji (censored); AT-X (uncensored)
- Original run: October 8, 2021 – March 18, 2022
- Episodes: 11
- Related
- World's End Harem: Fantasia
- icon

World's End Harem (Japanese: 終末のハーレム, Hepburn: Shūmatsu no Hāremu) is a Japanese manga series written by LINK and illustrated by Kotaro Shono. The first part of the manga was serialized in Shueisha's online magazine Shōnen Jump+ from May 2016 to June 2020, while a second part, World's End Harem: After World, was serialized in the same platform from May 2021 to May 2023. Its chapters have been collected in eighteen tankōbon volumes. The manga is licensed in North America by Seven Seas Entertainment under its Ghost Ship adult imprint.

The series has inspired two additional manga series also written by LINK, titled World's End Harem: Fantasia and World's End Harem: Britannia Lumiére, respectively. Two audio dramas were released in May 2017 and August 2021. A virtual reality game adaptation developed by DMM Games was released in March 2019. An anime television series adaptation by Studio Gokumi and AXsiZ premiered its first episode in October 2021 and resumed from January to March 2022.

== Synopsis ==
In the year 2040, Reito Mizuhara is a young man who is put into cryostasis while waiting for a life-saving treatment to be developed in order to cure the rare disease he suffers from. Five years later, Reito awakens to discover that, in this period of time, an extremely lethal and contagious virus called the MK (Man Killer) has emerged, which mysteriously affects only males, causing the death of about 99.9% of the world's male population, leaving approximately one million survivors who were put into cryostasis before being infected. Much to his surprise, Reito also learns that he is one of five men in Japan who somehow developed immunity to the MK Virus and, as a result, is required to participate in a breeding program by impregnating as many women as possible so that their children can replenish the world's population. While Reito investigates the secrets surrounding the MK Virus and the mysterious disappearance of his childhood friend Elisa Tachibana, the series also shows the perspective of the other men who have developed immunity to the MK Virus, each with their own circumstances.

== Characters ==
Reito Mizuhara (水原 怜人, Mizuhara Reito)
Voiced by: Taichi Ichikawa, Makoto Koichi^{Ep. 2 credits} (young)
A researcher who goes into deep sleep while waiting for a cure for his illness. After waking up, he learns that he has been cured, but that most of the world's men have died due to the MK Virus. He has feelings for his childhood friend Elisa, and refuses to mate with any of the other girls presented including Mira. Instead, he continues to work on finding a cure for the MK Virus.
Mira Suō (周防 美来, Suō Mira)
Voiced by: Haruka Shiraishi
A woman assigned to take care of Reito. She bears a close resemblance to Reito's childhood friend Elisa. It is later revealed she is actually Elisa's clone.
Elisa Tachibana (橘 絵理沙, Tachibana Erisa)
Voiced by: Haruka Shiraishi
Reito's childhood friend and a researcher. She and Reito had mutual feelings for each other. In the sequel After World, it is revealed that she had died of an illness and her organs were donated to Mira.
Akane Ryūzōji (龍造寺 朱音, Ryūzōji Akane)
Voiced by: Yō Taichi
Reito's lustful nurse. Her mother Kihara is the leader of Japan's council of rulers.
Sui Yamada (山田 翠, Yamada Sui)
Voiced by: Aya Yamane
Reito's bodyguard. Though she looks like a small child, she is strong enough to knock out a rampaging bear.
Rea Katagiri (片桐 麗亜, Katagiri Reia)
Voiced by: Keiko Watanabe
Reito's new attendant after Mira was fired. She has feelings for Mira and dislikes Reito for being close to her.
Maria Kuroda (黒田 マリア, Kuroda Maria)
Voiced by: Yurie Kozakai
A shy virologist who assists Reito in making the cure for the MK Virus. She is the older sister of Chifuyu Rehn Kuroda.
Mahiru Mizuhara (水原 まひる, Mizuhara Mahiru)
Voiced by: Yukina Shuto
Reito's younger sister who works at a refugee shelter.
Kyōji Hino (火野 恭司, Hino Kyōji)
Voiced by: Takuya Eguchi
A lustful, hedonistic man who enjoys living in a world of only women.
Neneko Isurugi (石動 寧々子, Isurugi Neneko)
Voiced by: Shizuka Ishigami
Hino's attendant.
Rena Kitayama (北山 玲奈, Kitayama Rena)
Voiced by: Satomi Amano
A former actress who becomes one of Hino's lovers.
Shōta Doi (土井 翔太, Doi Shōta)
Voiced by: Kazuki Ura
A boy who wears glasses who was put into cryostasis while waiting for a cure for his multiple sclerosis. He has feelings for his teacher Yuzuki, and chooses her as his first mating partner. Later on in the series, he receives a makeover and becomes the first president of a Japanese republic.
Karen Kamiya (神谷 花蓮, Kamiya Karen)
Voiced by: Ayana Taketatsu
Shōta's attendant who secretly plots to take over the world.
Yuzuki Hanyū (羽生 柚希, Hanyū Yuzuki)
Voiced by: Marika Hayase
Shōta's teacher who becomes his lover and the first woman to be pregnant with his child.
Shunka Hiiragi (柊 春歌, Hiiragi Shunka)
Voiced by: Haruka Michii
Shōta's classmate and lover who used to be bullied like him.
Natsu Ichijō (一条 奈都, Ichijō Natsu)
Voiced by: Arisa Aihara
Shōta's classmate and lover. She is a rich girl who used to be in an arranged marriage and is not used to mundane tasks like dressing herself.
Akira Tōdō (東堂 晶, Tōdō Akira)
Voiced by: Riho Iida
Shōta's classmate and lover who is an athlete.
Chifuyu Rehn Kuroda (黒田・レイン・ちふゆ, Kuroda Rein Chifuyu)
Voiced by: Natsumi Takamori
Shōta's classmate who is jealous of the others and the fact that Shōta is not attracted to her because she looks like a child. She is the younger sister of Maria Kuroda.
Shion Hoshino (星野 汐音, Hoshino Shion)
Voiced by: Reina Ueda
Shōta's classmate who used to ignore him when he was bullied.
Erika (エリカ)
Voiced by: Yuki Kudo
The girlfriend of Shōta's bully Takamatsu who bullied Shōta as well.
Chloe Mansfield (クロエ・マンスフィールド, Kuroe Mansufīrudo)
Voiced by: Rumi Okubo
An American who attempted to seduce Reito. She turns out to be the leader of a group of mercenaries. In After World, it is revealed she was brainwashed by the terrorist organization Maria's Womb of a Virgin to be their pawn. After regaining her memories, Chloe gets revenge by killing the three sages for brainwashing her and causing the death of the man she loved.

== Media ==
=== Manga ===
World's End Harem, written by LINK and illustrated by Kotaro Shono, started on Shueisha's online magazine Shōnen Jump+ on May 8, 2016. In May 2020, it was announced that the first part of the manga reached its climax. The first part of the manga finished with its 85th chapter on June 21, 2020. In March 2021, it was announced that the second part of the manga, titled World's End Harem: After World, (Note: 終末(しゅうまつ)のハーレム After World, Shūmatsu no Hāremu Afutā Warudo) would start to be published on Shōnen Jump+ on May 9 of that year. The final arc of After World started on December 4, 2022. The series finished on May 7, 2023.

Shueisha has collected its chapters into individual tankōbon volumes. The first volume was published on September 2, 2016. As of June 2, 2023, eighteen volumes have been released. In October 2017, Seven Seas Entertainment announced the acquisition of the manga for an English language release under its Ghost Ship imprint for mature readers.

==== Related series ====
A manga series, titled World's End Harem: Fantasia, written by LINK and illustrated by SAVAN, started in Shueisha's seinen manga magazine Ultra Jump in April 2018. It was also published on Shōnen Jump+ and the mobile app Young Jump!, continuing digitally only from March 2022 to April 2026. In April 2019, Seven Seas Entertainment licensed the manga for an English language release under its Ghost Ship imprint for mature readers.

A spin-off series, titled World's End Harem: Britannia Lumiére, (Note: 終末(しゅうまつ)のハーレム Britannia(ブリタニア) Lumiére(リュミエール), Shūmatsu no Hāremu Buritania Ryumiēru) written by LINK and illustrated by Kira Etō, started to be published on Shōnen Jump+ and the mobile app Manga Mee on June 26, 2020. Shueisha also simultaneous publishes the series in English for free on Manga Plus. In December 2020, the series went on hiatus after the release of its 17th chapter due to Etō's health condition, but later resumed serialization in June 2021. The series ended on July 29, 2021, with the release of its 22nd chapter.

=== Anime ===
In May 2020, it was announced that the series would receive an anime television series adaptation. The series was animated by Studio Gokumi and AXsiZ, with Yū Nobuta as the director and Tatsuya Takahashi as the scriptwriter. Masaru Koseki designed the characters, while Shigenobu Ookawa composed the series' music. The first episode of the series premiered on October 8, 2021, while later episodes were delayed to January 2022 due to a need to "closely examine" the anime's production. The series resumed airing on Tokyo MX, BS Fuji, and AT-X from January 7 to March 18, 2022, starting from the first episode. The opening theme is "Just Do It" performed by Helical, while the ending theme is "Ending Mirage" performed by Exina.

In August 2021, Crunchyroll announced that they had acquired the license to the anime for worldwide streaming, excluding Asian territories, while Muse Communication licensed the series in South and Southeast Asia.

==== Episodes ====
No.	Title (Note: All English titles are taken from Crunchyroll.)	Directed by	Written by	Storyboarded by	Original release date
1	"World of Women"; Transliteration: "Onna-tachi no Sekai" (Japanese: 女たちの世界)	Yoshitaka Nagaoka	Tatsuya Takahashi	Yū Nobuta	October 8, 2021 (Note: Episodes 1 and 2 were pre-screened on September 25, 2021.)
In 2040, Reito Mizuhara is cryogenically frozen after he contracts multiple sclerosis. Five years later, Reito is cured and revived by Mira Suō. Mira explains that a year after Reito was frozen, the Male Killer (MK) Virus emerged and wiped out the male population except for him and four other immune men who were similarly frozen. They are obligated to have children to save humanity from extinction. In disbelief, Reito goes outside and is quickly attacked by lust-crazed women until he is rescued. His sister Mahiru, who is now a teenager, arrives and explains that their brother Ryuu contracted the virus and had to be frozen to save his life. She also reveals that his childhood friend, Elisa Tachibana, went missing three years ago. That night, Mira attempts to seduce Reito, but he rejects her advances. The next day, Mira shows Reito several bathing girls and asks him to choose his conception partner. Shocked, he refuses and insists he must locate Elisa as she is the only woman he wants children with. Mira agrees but says until Elisa is found, she will send a different girl to his room every night.
2	"Two Women"; Transliteration: "Futari no Josei" (Japanese: 二人の女性)	Tatsuya Fujinaka	Tetsuya Yamada	Yūichi Abe	January 14, 2022
Kyōji Hino, one of the immune men, enjoys his new life and sleeps with the actress Rena Kitayama. After Reito, Mahiru, and Mira have a meal, Reito runs into Hino, who mocks him for his hesitancy. Akane Ryuzouji later ambushes Reito in the shower and attempts to seduce him, but he faints and is carried to his room. He reluctantly sleeps platonically with Akane and Sui Yamada, as Mira changes her mind and assigns them to him. The next day, Reito, Mira, Akane, and Sui examine Elisa's old laboratory for clues when they get attacked by an escaped bear, but Sui knocks it out. When he learns Elisa was working on a cure for the MK Virus prior to her disappearance, Reito decides to finish her work and appears on the news to relay his goal. After Mahiru scolds him, he finds a recorded message inside Elisa's old teddy bear where she reveals the MK Virus is a man-made bioweapon. He confides to Mira that she resembles Elisa and apologizes for not producing babies, but she says working on a cure is indeed the better solution. Meanwhile, a council of women views Reito as threatening their power. They then arrange for another man to be revived.
3	"3rd Man"; Transliteration: "Dai San no Otoko" (Japanese: 第3の男)	Hirokazu Yamada	Tatsuya Takahashi	Hirokazu Yamada	January 21, 2022
In 2040, Shōta Doi is tormented by the bully Takamatsu, his girlfriend Erika, and his gang, and his only allies are his sister Mayu and his teacher Yuzuki Hanyū. He contracts an illness and is frozen, growing resentful when his classmates do not care and walk out during his goodbye speech. He is cured and revived five years later by Karen Kamiya, who explains the MK Virus and that Mayu went missing. He resumes class in his old school and reunites with Yuzuki, who seduces him. He starts to bond with other girls but gets injured by a stray volleyball. Yuzuki treats and seduces him again, while they admit they have always loved each other. Karen later reports to her superiors, who ask why they had to reopen the old school. She says Shōta and the girls do not know about Hino and Reito, so they think Shōta is the last man on Earth. As such, they will use them as pawns in their scheme to take over the world.
4	"School's Secret"; Transliteration: "Gakuen no Himitsu" (Japanese: 学園の秘密)	Tatsuya Fujinaka	Tetsuya Yamada	Tatsuya Fujinaka; Yū Nobuta	January 28, 2022
Shōta has been sleeping with Yuzuki every day. One week later, Karen drags him to swimming class. Natsu Ichijō is subsequently assigned to be his temporary roommate. After Shōta helps her get dressed, she confesses that her father gave her an arranged marriage to a much older man until they were both killed by the MK Virus. She then seduces him. Meanwhile, Reito is working on the cure when Mira informs him that Mahiru works at a refugee shelter. However, she warns him that if others discover Mahiru is his sister, she may be endangered. Reito meets Hino, who reveals he has impregnated one of his girls. When Yuzuki returns, Shōta confesses that he slept with Ichijō and begs for forgiveness, but she says they all know and he belongs to everyone. He confronts Karen and demands answers. She takes him before the class and says she reopened his old school to make him comfortable so he would mate and repopulate the planet. All the girls then undress before him. The council says that since Reito refuses to mate, Mira is useless and will be removed from her post.
5	"First Victim"; Transliteration: "Saisho no Giseisha" (Japanese: 最初の犠牲者)	Yūji Kanzaki	Tatsuya Takahashi	Hiroyuki Ōshima	February 4, 2022
Reito has a month to make the cure before he must mate. Meanwhile, Mira is fired as Reito's attendant, even though she is allowed to stay, and is replaced by Rea Katagiri, who appears hostile towards him. Additionally, Reito is partnered with the shy virologist Maria Kuroda. The group then travels to Keimon City, where the MK Virus emerged, to interview Taniguchi, the hospitalized widow of the virus' first victim. Reito reluctantly bathes with the girls in a hot spring. Taniguchi refuses to cooperate and mocks Reito for not mating. When they leave, it is revealed that Taniguchi is in contact with Elisa and wonders why Elisa will not reveal herself. In a hotel's sauna, an American named Chloe attempts to seduce Reito and tricks him into kissing her just as the others walk in, angering them. Later, Mira talks with Taniguchi about Reito's honor and convinces her to share what she knows. However, someone sneaks in and poisons her IV tube, leaving her in critical condition. Before losing consciousness, Taniguchi asks that a photo of her and her husband be given to Reito.
6	"Intertwining Plots"; Transliteration: "Karamiau Omowaku" (Japanese: 絡み合う思惑)	Ryō Miyata; Tatsuya Fujinaka	Tetsuya Yamada	Kōji Yoshikawa; Hikaru Takeuchi	February 11, 2022
Reito, Sui, and Maria investigate the abandoned hospital where the first victim was treated but find nothing. Akane deduces that Taniguchi was poisoned and suspects Rea. Rea rescues her sister from being raped by another girl. Reito scans the photo and finds incomplete blueprints of the MK Virus' design. Akane and Maria later warn him that people working on the cure mysteriously disappear. Meanwhile, bored with his harem, Hino spots Mahiru and chooses her as his next bed partner. His attendant, Neneko, informs Reito and Mahiru, who protests that she is only 16, but agrees to a lunch date with Reito attending. The council orders Reito to distribute rations as a publicity stunt while Akane reveals their leader, Kihara, is her mother. Rea then confesses her love to Mira but is rejected. As Reito passes out rations, a sniper attempts to kill him but is stopped by Rea's sister. At the lunch date, Mahiru rejects Hino, depressing him, but he sleeps with his jealous harem to placate them. Reito, Maria, Sui, and Akane discover that many of the missing doctors passed by the abandoned hospital.
7	"Assigned to Me"; Transliteration: "Boku Tōban" (Japanese: 僕当番)	Yūji Kanzaki	Tatsuya Takahashi	Hiroyuki Ōshima	February 18, 2022
Karen tells Shōta he cannot leave the school until he graduates. Later, the class draws lots to choose his new roommate. Rikka Yanagi wins, but he runs away to the teacher's lounge because she resembles Erika. Shunka Hiiragi walks in and bonds with him by revealing she also used to be bullied. She then seduces him. Rikka complains it was supposed to be her turn and fights Shunka, so Shōta runs away again. He calls Yuzuki but gets no answer. Akira Tōdō, who hit him with the volleyball, apologizes and seduces him. Karen makes a new arrangement where a girl will be assigned as his servant daily. After kissing Rikka, he trips and scrapes his hand. After getting treated, Karen orders Ichijō, Shunka, and Akira to sleep with him simultaneously. Chifuyu attempts to seduce him, but he refuses because she looks like a child. Karen informs him that Yuzuki moved away, angering him. Over the next few days, he becomes more sexually aggressive with the girls. One day, Shion Hoshino, one of the girls who regularly ignored him when he was bullied, transfers in, shocking him.
8	"Revenge"; Transliteration: "Fukushū" (Japanese: 復讐)	Tatsuya Fujinaka	Tetsuya Yamada	Kōji Yoshikawa; Hikaru Takeuchi	February 25, 2022
Shion asks several people for help, but the girls refuse due to her age. Karen explains Shion tried to become an actress, but due to the MK Virus, she can only get a role if she mates with Shōta. Still angry about her ignoring him, he humiliates her by forcing her to come to class in her underwear before he mates with her in public. Afterward, Shōta asks Karen to find someone and bring her to him. Meanwhile, Reito's group speculates the abandoned hospital is where the virus originated. Karen delivers Erika in chains where a vindictive Shōta forces her to lick him. Karen tells the girls to compete to become Shōta's primary wife. Ichijō and Akira seduce him in the swimming pool. He later sleeps with several girls in various places. He brings one to his room, where Erika sits collared and acting like a dog. He asks her what happened to Takamatsu, but she does not know. After Shōta sleeps with the girl, Erika begs for her medication to counteract her drug addiction, so he feeds it to her with his mouth. Reito's group returns to the abandoned hospital, and he suspects there may be clues to Elisa's location.
9	"Feast of Debauchery"; Transliteration: "Niku no Shinrin" (Japanese: 肉の森林)	Toshikatsu Tokoro	Tetsuya Yamada	Kōichi Okizaki	March 4, 2022
American mercenaries, led by Ms. Pope and Ms. Mansfield, seek to acquire Reito. A girl in Shōta's class is contacted by Elisa, who tells her to start their plan. Shōta is seduced by several girls in the girl's bath and then starts sleeping with them in various places. Reito's group explores the abandoned hospital where Sui accidentally breaks a wall to reveal an air duct. They crawl through it and fall into an underground laboratory. The people inside try to kill them, but are killed by the mercenaries led by Chloe, aka Ms. Mansfield. They find a time bomb and are forced to escape in a helicopter as the lab is destroyed. Ms. Pope meets the council and arrests them after deducing the MK Virus was created under their orders. Chloe reveals Elisa is a member of a terrorist group, shocking Reito. As Shōta sleeps with several girls at once, Shion attempts to escape the school but is apprehended by Karen. Shōta returns to his room and takes pity on a sleeping Erika, covering her with a blanket. Suddenly, the school is rocked by explosions. Reito's group sees the explosions while Chloe is informed terrorists have kidnapped a man.
10	"The Two Numbers"; Transliteration: "Futari no Nanbāzu" (Japanese: 二人のナンバーズ)	Hodaka Kuramoto	Tatsuya Takahashi	Hodaka Kuramoto	March 11, 2022
Shōta wakes up in the hospital, where Karen explains terrorists tried and failed to kidnap him. She is surprised he shielded Erika and reveals other men are out there. He asks her why she does not sleep with him, and she says she wants to rule the world; he agrees to help her. Elisa's terrorists abducted a man in stasis, Zen Kinebuchi. Chloe's group takes over Japan and orders Hino to stop mating until the terrorists are dealt with. He agrees but is angered when Chloe separates him from his girls. Akane reveals Kihara and the other council members will be imprisoned for creating the MK Virus, so Reito helps her visit her mother's cell. Elisa hacks the airwaves to reveal her group is called Izanami, who are not terrorists but a group of rebels against the UW. They claim all the world leaders created the virus to wipe out men and create a world of only women and that Izanami aims to save the men. They demand all the men in stasis and those awake to be turned over to them. Reito's group decides Chloe cannot be trusted and that they must escape. They suddenly find Shōta and Karen in Reito's room.
11	"Escape"; Transliteration: "Dasshutsu" (Japanese: 脱出)	N/A	Tatsuya Takahashi	Kōichi Okizaki; Yū Nobuta	March 18, 2022
In a flashback, Karen performed a procedure on Shōta to make him slightly older and no longer need glasses. In the present, they meet Chloe and bring Shōta's girls, briefly reuniting Maria with her little sister, Chifuyu. Meanwhile, Reito meets Mira and urges her to escape with them, but she will only agree if he mates with her, which he refuses. Suddenly, Ms. Pope arrests them, Akane, and Sui, saying they will be taken to America, but Rea and Maria knock her out, and they escape to Mahiru's shelter. Shōta and Karen make a deal with Chloe to allow Shōta to keep mating and make Karen the ruler of Japan. Reito's group gets on a ship owned by Izanami headed to Taiwan, but Rea and Mira stay behind and are arrested. Hino calls Reito and wishes him luck, but he will not leave his girls, whom Chloe imprisoned, behind. Chloe has Ms. Pope stripped and whipped for her failure, saying she will wipe out all men. After Shōta sleeps with his girls, he spots the imprisoned Rena and chooses her as his next conquest. The ship lands where Reito finally reunites with Elisa.

=== Audio drama ===
An audio drama based on the manga was released on the official Shōnen Jump+ website for nine consecutive days from May 28 to June 5, 2017. Due to its sexual tenor, some segments of the drama were censored, requiring a password to unlock its content. Another audio drama started to be released on YouTube on August 27, 2021.

=== Video game ===
In November 2018, it was announced that the manga would get a virtual reality game adaptation developed by DMM Games, the video game division of DMM.com. Titled World's End Harem VR, (Note: 終末のハーレムVR, Shūmatsu no Hāremu VR) the game's story was separated into three different chapters of five minutes each that reproduced popular scenes from the series, and it starred Shizuka Itō as Mira Suō, Marie Miyake as Akira Tōdō and Yū Asakawa as Akane Ryūzōji. World's End Harem VR was officially released on March 4, 2019.

== Reception ==
=== Popularity ===
By November 2018, the manga had over 3 million copies in circulation; over 5 million copies in circulation by December 2020; over 7 million copies in circulation December 2021; and over 9 million copies in circulation by May 2023. Due to the manga's popularity, some of its characters have become popular cosplay themes, causing a trend in Japan where fans attempt to replicate their iconic costumes. To commemorate the release of the manga's fifth volume, a collaborative event was held in Shueisha's adult magazine Weekly Playboy, in which 200 winners were selected to participate in an actual event that took place on March 17, 2018, at a bar in Shinjuku, Tokyo, where they were able to take pictures with gravure idols cosplaying as female characters from the series.

=== Critical response ===
Jonathon Greenall of CBR praised the series for its unique approach to the harem genre but criticized its semi-apocalyptic setting, stating that it did not fit the harem format. Maxwell Freedman of CBR noted that the harem genre has long been controversial, with criticism ranging from trashy and repetitive to misogynistic. He argued that while the series does little to counter such criticisms, it has some deceptive depth, becoming increasingly psychological as it explores the dystopian consequences of a female-only future rather than glorifying it as a male paradise. Freedman added that the majority of the manga's appeal nevertheless remained in its fanservice.
