= World's End Harem: Fantasia =

Japanese manga series by LINK and SAVAN

- First tankōbon volume cover, featuring Latiforiazhard

終末のハーレム ファンタジア (Shūmatsu no Hāremu Fantajia)
- Genre: Dark fantasy; Harem; Sword and sorcery
- Manga
- Written by: LINK
- Illustrated by: SAVAN
- Published by: Shueisha
- English publisher: NA: Seven Seas Entertainment
- Magazine: Ultra Jump; (April 19, 2018 – February 19, 2022); Shōnen Jump+; Young Jump!
- Original run: April 19, 2018 – April 26, 2026
- Volumes: 18
- Manga

World's End Harem: Fantasia Academy
- Written by: LINK
- Illustrated by: Okada Andō
- Published by: Shueisha
- English publisher: NA: Seven Seas Entertainment
- Magazine: Ultra Jump; (May 19, 2020 – February 19, 2022); Shōnen Jump+; (August 2, 2020 – July 17, 2022)
- Original run: May 19, 2020 – July 17, 2022
- Volumes: 3
- icon

World's End Harem: Fantasia (Japanese: 終末のハーレム ファンタジア, Hepburn: Shūmatsu no Hāremu Fantajia) is a Japanese manga series written by LINK and illustrated by SAVAN. It is related to the World's End Harem series. The manga originally started in Shueisha's Ultra Jump in April 2018; it was also being published simultaneously on the Shōnen Jump+ and Young Jump! digital platforms, continuing digitally only from March 2022 to April 2026. Its chapters were collected in 18 tankōbon volumes. Seven Seas Entertainment licensed the manga and its spin-off for an English release under its Ghost Ship imprint.

== Premise ==
Ark is the young prince and heir to the throne of the small Kingdom of Nargala. Under the mentorship of the female knight Celine, he studies the way of the pen and the sword. One day, he is forcibly separated from his childhood love, Aurelia Isteshia, after she was chosen to be part of the harem of the Empire's leader. Determined to get her back, Ark stumbles upon a mysterious dark elf named Latiforiazhard who helps Ark undergo a powerful transformation. With his newfound power, Ark sets off on a journey with Latiforiazhard in order to fix the wrongs of the world.

== Publication ==
Written by LINK and illustrated by SAVAN, World's End Harem: Fantasia started in Shueisha's Ultra Jump on April 19, 2018; it was also published on the Shōnen Jump+ and Young Jump! digital platforms; the series finished in Ultra Jump on February 19, 2022, continuing digitally only. The manga entered its final story arc in July 2024 and entered on hiatus again in September of that same year. It resumed in February 2026 and finished on April 26 of the same year. Shueisha collected its chapters in 18 tankōbon volumes, released from November 2, 2018, to August 4, 2026.

Seven Seas Entertainment licensed the manga for an English language release under its Ghost Ship imprint for mature readers.

A spin-off series, titled World's End Harem: Fantasia Academy (終末のハーレム ファンタジア学園, Shūmatsu no Hāremu Fantajia Gakuen) and featuring characters in modern-day school setting, started in Ultra Jump on May 19, 2020; it also started on Shōnen Jump+ on August 2 of the same year. The series finished in Ultra Jump on February 19, 2022, continuing only on Shōnen Jump+. The series finished on July 17, 2022. Three volumes were released from January 4, 2021, to August 4, 2022.

The spin-off series is also licensed by Seven Seas Entertainment and released under the Ghost Ship imprint.

=== Volumes ===
No.	Original release date	Original ISBN	English release date	English ISBN
1	November 2, 2018	978-4-08-891129-8	September 24, 2019	978-1-947804-63-0
1. "Prologue" (プロローグ, Purorōgu); 2. "Prelude" (序曲, Jiyokyoku); 3. "Sorceress" (魔導師, Madōshi); 3. "The Three Promises" (三つの約束, Mittsu no Yakusoku); 4. "Birth" (誕生, Tanjō)
2	March 4, 2019	978-4-08-891247-9	February 25, 2020	978-1-947804-64-7
5. "Source of Fire" (火種, Hidane); 6. "Effect" (効カ, Kōka); 7. "Ally" (味方, Mikata); 8. "Castle of Deceit" (謀略の城, Bōryaku no Shiro); 9. "Running Wild" (暴走, Bōsō)
3	August 2, 2019	978-4-08-891353-7	October 27, 2020	978-1-947804-73-9
10. "Reason for Power" (カの理, Ka no Kotowari); 11. "Attribute Judgment" (属性判定, Zokusei Hantei); 12. "Heading North" (北へ, Kita e); 13. "White Hell" (白き地獄, Shiroki Jigoku)
4	January 4, 2020	978-4-08-891470-1	March 30, 2021	978-1-947804-85-2
14. "Dungeon Exploration" (ダンジョン探索, Danjon Tansaku); 15. "Two Fierce Fights" (激闘、ふたつ, Gekitō, Futatsu); 16. "Cassia Snowblood" (雪血のキャシア, Yukichi no Kyashia); 17. "Invasion, the Demon of Ice and Snow" (襲来、氷雪の魔人, Shūrai, Hyōsetsu no Majin); Extra. Bonus Manga (おまけ漫画, Omake Manga)
5	August 4, 2020	978-4-08-891652-1	October 19, 2021	978-1-648274-96-1
18. "Magic Wall" (魔法壁, Mahō Kabe); 19. "Accident" (異変, Ihen); 20. "Memories of Tia" (ティアの記憶, Tia no Kioku); 21. "Return" (帰還, Kikan)
6	January 4, 2021	978-4-08-891762-7	February 22, 2022	978-1-638581-26-0
22. "Strange Petitioner" (奇妙な陳情者, Kimyōna Chinjō-sha); 23. "Unexpected Connection" (意外な繋がり, Igaina Tsunagari); 24. "Rise of Magical Energy" (魔力の向上, Maryoku no Kōjō); 25. "Cooperation" (力合わせて, Chikara Awasete); 26. "Longevity" (命の長さ, Inochi no Naga-sa)
7	June 4, 2021	978-4-08-891873-0	July 26, 2022	978-1-63858-387-5
27. "Goodbye, and Then..." (別れ、そして, Wakare, Soshite); 28. "Continent Map" (大陸地図, Tairiku Chizu); 29. "Katakami Ceremony" (堅神式, Katakami-shiki); 30. "Two Spells" (二つの呪術, Futatsu no Jujutsu)
8	October 4, 2021	978-4-08-892110-5	March 21, 2023	978-1-63858-854-2
31. "After the Curse" (呪いの果て, Noroi no Hate); 32. "Reinforcements" (挙兵, Kyohei); 33. "The Nobles' Conspiracy" (謀略の貴族たち, Bōryaku no Kizoku-tachi); 34. "Preach" (窮地, Kyūchi)
9	January 4, 2022	978-4-08-892159-4	July 4, 2023	978-1-68579-593-1
35. "Rain and Tears" (雨と涙, Ame to Namida); 36. "The Battle of Bucket Gorge" (バケット峡谷の戦い, Baketto Kyōkoku no Tatakai); 37. "Those Who Crawl on the Ground" (地を這う者たち, Chi o hau Monotachi); 38. "Continental Earthquake" (大陸震撼, Tairiku Shinkan)
10	May 2, 2022	978-4-08-892304-8	November 28, 2023	979-8-88843-061-3
39. "Mage Apprentice Letta" (魔導士見習いレッタ, Madōshi Minarai Retta); 40. "Golden Eyes" (黄金の目, Ōgon no Me); 41. "Power of the Eye" (眼の力, Me no Chikara); 42. "White Mole" (白モグラ, Shiro Mogura)
11	September 2, 2022	978-4-08-892459-5	April 2, 2024	979-8-88843-423-9
43. "Departure" (船出, Funade); 44. "Consanguinity" (血族, Ketsuzoku); 45. "Executive" (幹部, Kanbu); 46. "Pieces" (駒, Koma); 47. "Imperial Four Generals" (帝国四将軍, Teikoku Yon Shōgun); 48. "Recapture" (奪還, Dakkan); 49. "Sacred Synthesis" (聖なる統合, Seinaru Tōgō); Extra. "Secret in the Public Bath" (大浴場での秘め事, Dai Yokujō de no Himegoto)
12	December 2, 2022	978-4-08-892588-2	August 6, 2024	979-8-88843-868-8
50. "Fighting Tournament" (闘技大会, Tōgi Taikai); 51. "Battle of Women" (女たちの激闘, Onna-tachi no Gekitō); 52. "Winner" (優勝者, Yūshō-sha); 53. "Lizard and Crocodile" (蜥蜴と鰐, Tokage to Wani); 54. "Coronation" (戴冠式, Taikanshiki); 55. "Raid" (襲撃, Shūgeki); 56. "Fate" (因縁, In'nen)
13	April 4, 2023	978-4-08-892733-6	December 3, 2024	979-8-88843-869-5
14	August 4, 2023	978-4-08-892884-5	April 8, 2025	979-8-89160-920-4
15	December 4, 2023	978-4-08-893149-4	August 5, 2025	979-8-89373-798-1
16	January 5, 2026	978-4-08-894112-7	November 24, 2026	979-8-89561-736-6
17	June 4, 2026	978-4-08-894330-5	—	—
18	August 4, 2026	978-4-08-894396-1	—	—

=== Fantasia Academy ===
No.	Original release date	Original ISBN	English release date	English ISBN
1	January 4, 2021	978-4-08-891763-4	June 7, 2022	978-1-63858-403-2
1. "Admission" (入学, Nyūgaku); 2. "Physical Measurement" (身体測定, Karada Sokutei); 3. "Self-Introduction, Part 1" (自己紹介①～ヤング編～, Jiko Sōkai ① ~Yangu-hen~); 4. "Self-Introduction, Part 2" (自己紹介②～アダルト編～, Jiko Shōkai ② ~Adaruto-hen~); 5. "Wenne and Gym Clothes" (ウェンヌと体操着, Uennu to Taisō Chaku); 6. "Celine and the Kendo Club" (セリーヌと剣道部, Serīnu to Kendō-bu); 7. "Tia and the Bathing Suits" (ティアと水着, Tia to Mizugi); 8. "Lilo and the Mysterious Experience" (リロと不思議体験, Riro to Fushigi Taiken); 9. "Transfer Student Ferraris" (転校生フェラリス, Tenkōsei Ferarisu); 10. "Aurelia's Escape" (アウレリアの脱走, Aureria no Dassō); 11. "The Love Consultation of Ferraris" (フェラリスの恋愛相談, Ferarisu no Ren'ai Sōdan); 12. "Halloween and Cosplay" (ハロウィンとコスプレ, Harōin to Kosupure); 13. "Cassia and the Prince" (キャシアと王子役, Kyashia to Ōji-yaku); 14. "Mine and the Repetition Crisis" (ミーネと留年危機, Mīne to Ryūnen Kiki); 15. "Aurelia's Christmas" (アウレリアとクリスマス, Aureria to Kurisumasu); 16. "Miss Lati's Daily Life" (ラティ先生の日常, Rati Sensei no Nichijō)
2	October 4, 2021	978-4-08-892111-2	March 7, 2023	978-1-63858-744-6
17. "Limit of Ark" (アルクの限界, Aruku no Genkai); 18. "Joanna and Fashion" (ジョアンナとオシャレ, Joanna to Oshare); 19. "Tia's Valentine" (ティアのバレンタイン, Tia no Barentain); 20. "Tammy's Wish" (タミィの願い, Tamyi no Negai); 21. "Reunion with Aurelia (Part 1)" (アウレリアと再会（前編）, Aureria to Saikai (Zenpen)); 22. "Reunion with Aurelia (Part 2)" (アウレリアと再会（後編）, Aureria to Saikai (Kōhen)); 23. "New Semester (Again)" (新学期（再）, Shin Gakki (Sai)); 24. "Wennes and Handkerchiefs" (ウェンヌとハンカチ, Uennu to Hankachi); 25. "Inter-School Exchange" (学校間交流, Gakkō-kan Kōryū); 26. "Observation of Ark's Club Activities" (アルクの部活動見学, Aruku no bu Katsudō Kengaku); 27. "Crown Prince Dutias" (皇太子ドゥティアス, Kōtaishi Dotiasu); 28. "Cleaning Round" (掃除の見回り, Sōji no Mimawari); 29. "Pool Time" (プールの時間, Pūru no Jikan); 30. "Mariya's Promotion" (マリヤの推し活, Mariya no Oshi Katsu); 31. "Ferraris and Summer Festival" (フェラリスと夏祭り, Ferarisu to Natsu Matsuri); 32. "Strategist Tier" (策士ティア, Sakushi Tia); 33. "Family Restaurant" (ファミリーレストラン, Famirī Resutoran); 34. "Art Time" (美術の時間, Bijutsu no Jikan)
3	August 4, 2022	978-4-08-892406-9	October 31, 2023	978-1-68579-509-2
35. "Challenge Miss Lati" (ラティ先生に挑戦, Rati Sensei ni Chōsen); 36. "Sports Festival" (体育祭, Taīkusai); 37. "Cultural Festival Visit" (文化祭訪問, Bunkasai Hōmon); 38. "Cooking Practice" (調理実習, Chōri Jisshū); 39. "Gift Exchange" (プレゼント交換, Purezento Kōkan); 40. "Playing in the Snow" (雪遊び, Yuki Asobi); 41. "All Relatives" (親戚一同, Shinseki Ichidō); 42. "First Visit of the Year to a Shrine" (初詣, Hatsumōde); 43. "Setsubun Day" (節分の日, Setsubun no Hi); 44. "Aurelia's Valentine" (アウレリアのバレンタイン, Aureria no Barentain); 45. "White Day" (ホワイトデー, Howaito Dē); 46. "Karaoke" (カラオケ, Karaoke); 47. "After School Time" (放課後の時間, Hōkago no Jikan); 48. "SNS"; 49. "Shopping Mall" (ショッピングモール, Shoppingu Mōru); 50. "Amusement Park" (遊園地, Yuenchi); 51. "Accomplished Abstinence" (禁欲達成, Kinyoku Tassei); Extra. "Promotion" (進級, Shinkyū)

== Reception ==
By December 2018, the manga had 100,000 copies in circulation.
