= Agharta (manga) =

Japanese manga series

- Cover of volume 9

アガルタ (Agaruta)
- Manga

Agharta
- Written by: Takaharu Matsumoto
- Published by: Shueisha (former); Wani Books (current)
- Magazine: Ultra Jump (1997–2009)
- Original run: 1997 – 2016
- Volumes: 11

Agharta (アガルタ, Agaruta) is a Japanese manga series written and illustrated by Takaharu Matsumoto, that was published in Shueisha's Ultra Jump magazine from 1997 to 2017.

In September 2016, it is currently being re-released by Wani Books and the manga concluded eleven volumes.

== Plot ==
Following a cataclysm, the earth becomes an immense desert in which the scarcity of drinkable water renders it a valuable commodity. The story centers around Juju, a teenage boy who belongs to one of the gangs which prevail on behalf of the new organizations, and Rael, a girl who will perhaps be able to save humanity.

== Characters ==
=== Main characters ===
Juju Meyer

A fourteen-year-old boy who is in a gang in the city near the West Sea. He and his sister, Anna-Marie, are orphans. His father was abusive to his mother (to the point she could no longer walk) and him. As a result, his sister shot and killed him. Juju wishes to bottle up his memories of his family. He does not talk about his sister because she does not remember him. He and sister was taken in by Stipe (leader of a gang). He was taught by Cori under Stipe's command. After he meets Rael on the "Higher Ground", the sacred island, he helps her escape. Throughout the story he obviously cares about Rael a lot and goes looking for her whenever she disappears.

Rael

A beautiful girl who seems to hold some very mysterious secrets/powers and an even crazier past. They meet at the "Higher Ground" the 2nd time. She is red haired and wears chains on her person at all times. She is Master Phillips' adopted daughter and kills without batting an eye. But after meeting Juju she will not kill if Juju asks her. Stating if Juju sides it must be true. In the beginning she could not talk but learns with the help of an old radio. Since her origins lie in the "Tamarix" (a sort of sacred tree), she needs contact with pure water to stay conscious. Apparently it is thought that she harbors inside of her "the Rem", something that seems to invoke fear. She possess super strength and speed and can let a voice out that can be mistaken for a howl which scares dogs away. She also talented with a gun. She has multiple personalities.

Blonie: Blonie is a shy and nervous personality.
Hooper: Hooper, in contrast to Blonie, is horribly sarcastic and an egomaniac.
Quint: Quint is different she needs observation.

=== East Valley ===
Yunfa

A country girl from the Eastern (Caren) Valley who has never been to the capital. Everyone calls her Yun. She wears a beanie with a x smile, smiley face and a tag. She saves Juju after he fights Riam when he's trying to get water for Rael. When Juju won against Riam she states she was right to believe in him and she treated his wounds. She starts to like Juju and is often worried about him. She becomes intimidated when she is near Real thought she does not no way. She blushes when Real stated she always be with Juju. She is older than she appears as stated by the Captain asking: You like 'em young? referring to Juju. She responds by re-breaking his nose. In the capital she was disappointed because she was expecting more. She meet up with Juju sister with Yunfa is mistaken for Real. While searching for a doctor for Anna-Marie she is mistaken for Lilith which makes an unaware Juju point a gun at her with her disarmed quickly. To escape Juju leaves her shirt.

Riam

Riam is vicious and deliberately draws out a fight to make her opponent suffer. In East Valley he keep starting fights to the point everyone did what he told them. Also as a result nobody wanted anything to do with Riam. Riam beats the crap out of Juju during the "Ceremony" of East Valley but seeing as how Juju actually beat him in the end, he somewhat holds respect for him. After the fight Riam sight in his right eye diminished and his right leg was broken. He "kidnaps" Juju sister during the funeral of Master Pillips. He can not swim.

Captain

Mainly used for comic-relief. He claims to buy and sell for everything but his own life. He was planning to sell Juju's organs when he saw him wash up shore with Rael. He wears a nose patch because Rael broke his nose.

Robert Phillips or Master/Lord Pillips

Lord Pillips is a direct descendant of Airis. When he adopted Rael is unknown. He is an old man in a wheelchair and wears a ring on each finger. He lived in the Higher Ground with Rael and owned over two thirds of it. He considers Rael his daughter and saw Juju as an amusing and charming guest. Even though Juju entered his home without being invited. He is against the Tamarix Project.

Professor Guy Fujinski

Has ties with Rael's past, and even might have to do with her "creation". He's what they call a "Gardener", and seems to have special abilities, like healing and resurrecting dead people. He resurrected Corii and his first meeting with Lord Phillips was that he resurrected him. He seem to be some type of android.

Ursula a.k.a. The Angle Lilith or Lily-White Lilith

Apparently Rael's little sister. She tried to kill Rael, but failed in the attempt. During the battle her tongue was bitten off and she suffered a massive chest wound. After being reborn from the Tamarix, her appearance is changed and she is even stronger. After that she becomes known as The Angel Lilith due to where she goes she kill everyone there. And Lily-white Lilith because she wear all white.

=== West Sea ===
Corii

Juju's friend and fellow gang member. He has blond hair and earrings and is energetic but violent when angered. He was the one who taught Juju about the gang under the orders of Stipe. While in "Higher Ground", he broke into the drug storage facility and died of an overdose (taking 5000 times the normal dose). He was subsequently resurrected by Professor Guy, though he did not return completely back to normal. Afterwards, he shows personality changes and surprising similarities to Rael's "conditions". He also became more forgetful, more brutal, and more violent in his actions. The resurrection was an experiment due to the drug he overdosed on was new experimental drug. The result: were unusual antibody, affected genes, and damage to his brain. He became something human but at the same time not quite human. During his take with Juju he started to help Juju look for Rael. With this causing victims during his interrogations.

Anna-Marie Meyer

Juju's older sister, and Stipe's mistress. When she and Juju were little, their dad was abusive and so in order to protect Juju, she shot their father in the head with his gun. She loves her brother (Juju) stating if Juju would to stop loving her she would not bear it. However, she seems to have lost all memories of Juju after he turned eight. She, too, like Rael and Corii, needs water or else she goes into a coma. She became hospitalized for it. Stipe visits her every day but only stays seating near her. During the funeral of Lord Pillips, Riam "kidnaps" her. When she meets Yunfa she mistook her for Juju girlfriend (Rael). She has a habit of making many handmade objects.

Stipe Miles

He's the leader of Juju's gang (the Wasko), is bald, and wears a suit. He hate kids and believes that Juju has potential. He sent Juju to get the money and water that was stolen by a former member (Ecisun). He took in Anna-Marie and in turn took in Juju. He and Riam have worked together for years.

== Volumes ==
1. ISBN 4-08-875645-2 published in April 1998
2. ISBN 4-08-875772-6 published in March 1999
3. ISBN 4-08-875822-6 published in August 1999
4. ISBN 4-08-875887-0 published in February 2000
5. ISBN 4-08-876098-0 published in February 2001
6. ISBN 4-08-876198-7 published in August 2001
7. ISBN 4-08-876574-5 published in February 2004
8. ISBN 4-08-876863-9 published in September 2005
9. ISBN 978-4-08-877227-1 published in April 2007
