= Addicted to Curry =

Japanese manga series

- First tankōbon volume cover

華麗なる食卓 (Karēnaru Shokutaku)
- Genre: Cooking
- Manga
- Written by: Kazuki Funatsu
- Published by: Shueisha
- Magazine: Weekly Young Jump
- Original run: January 18, 2001 – December 13, 2012
- Volumes: 49
- icon

Addicted to Curry (Japanese: 華麗なる食卓, Hepburn: Karēnaru Shokutaku; lit. 'The Great Dining Table') is a Japanese cooking manga series written and illustrated by Kazuki Funatsu. It was serialized in Shueisha's seinen manga magazine Weekly Young Jump from January 2001 to December 2012, with its chapters collected in 49 tankōbon volumes.

== Story ==
The series follows Yui Sonezaki, a kindhearted schoolgirl who helps run her father's struggling restaurant, Curry House Cooking Ganesha. After she accidentally hits a stranger, Makito Koenji, with a soda can while trying to offer him food, he tracks her down—not for revenge, but because he was searching for her father, Sōichiro. Learning that Sōichiro has left to hone his skills, leaving Yui to manage the failing restaurant alone, Koenji teams up with her to save the business, feeling indebted to both father and daughter.

== Characters ==
=== Main characters ===
Makito Koenji (高円寺マキト, Kōenji Makito)
Makito is a Singaporean-born chef of Japanese descent. After being saved by Sōichiro Sonezaki, he takes over the struggling Curry House Cooking Ganesha restaurant in his absence. Though skilled in traditional curry-making, he innovates new dishes, attracting customers with his culinary creativity. Prone to lecherous behavior, he often harasses women, particularly his housemate Yui, and habitually chews cinnamon sticks for focus. His father, a food critic who abandoned his family, holds the secret to his late mother's chicken curry—the only dish Makito cannot replicate. After losing a curry battle to Sōichiro, he returns to Osaka and later competes in the televised cooking tournament Edible Fight.
Yui Sonezaki (曽根崎結維, Sonezaki Yui)
The daughter of Sonezaki Sōichiro. She is a first year at Toritsu Shinnet High school and is in the kendou club. Yui is generally a nice, mild-mannered girl who will stop to feed any hungry animal she sees and even bring the animal home. She sometimes can be short tempered and fragile. Her father owns a curry restaurant, but when the business fails he goes to sharpen his cooking skills, leaving the restaurant to Yui. Despite the fact that her father abandoned her, Yui still loves him and his curry cooking. When Yui meets Makito she teams up with him to save the restaurant. She tries to help Makito as much as possible and comes to admire and respect his ways. She has feelings for Makito. She has recently travelled to Osaka in hopes of reuniting with Makito.

=== Oukarou Restaurant ===
Munakata Shigemitsu (宗方重光, Shigemitsu Munakata)
The owner of the Western Cuisine Restaurant Oukarou and Youko's father. He always wear an eyepatch Youko gave him despite not being blind. Makito worked for him 2 years ago and wants him to come back even going as far as to let him have his daughter. He was later diagnosed with cancer, and walked Yōko down the aisle of a mock wedding to Makito. Although it was his wife who staged the whole cancer lie.
Munakata Yōko (宗方陽子, Yōko Munakata)
Yui's pretty teacher who's also an old friend of Makito. Her father is Munakata Shigemitsu. She has great respect for Makito's cooking skills. Getting drunk turns her into a violent dominatrix. She might have feelings for Makito in the past.
Mukai Shinji (向井新二, Shinji Mukai)
A young ambitious chef in training employed by Oukarou, but working with Makito and Yui at Curry House Cooking Ganesha as a return favor and as a sort of education, since no one at Oukarou has time to teach him. The first time he observed Makito, he was disappointed at Makito for not doing the way a chef is supposed to act (according to the manual chef book he has), but after Yui points out that not everybody is perfect and even Makito has his own weak spot. he starts to watch Makito and he sees that the customers enjoy his way as a chef, he now wants to learn from Makito how to cook curry. His dream is to open a curry shop of his own.

=== Other characters ===
Kanamori
Kanamori wants to buy Cooking Ganesha from Yui and he will do anything to get it as far as to give over 30 million yen. When Yui rejects the money he buys the rental cd next door to Cooking Genesha called Curry Shop - India to steal Cooking Ganesha's customers, but that does not bother Makito at all. So he asks one of the co-workers, Udou, to have a curry battle against Makito. The rules were that if Makito loses he would have to give Cooking Ganesha away to him and if they lose he will not bother them ever again, however the plan failed as Makito's food overpowered Udou's food.
Shinozaki
Shinozaki is a very large woman who frequently eats at the Ganesha curry restaurant and will defend it with all her power to keep it open. She is belligerent and short tempered. Shinozaki attends a female-only college and is a wrestler.
Sōichiro Sonezaki (曽根崎総一郎, Sonezaki Sōichiro)
Yui's father and the man who saved Makito from dying of starvation long ago. He promised to tell Makito about the person he was looking for if he came to Ganesha restaurant. However, Sōichiro leaves his restaurant and his daughter to improve his curry cooking abilities. He returns at the end of the first arc, where he defeats Makito in a curry competition for the restaurant's future. The competition portrays Sōichiro as almost superhuman when he becomes focused on cooking and his dish was, despite its plain appearance, a perfect meal that encompassed the very essence of curry as a meal for friends and family.
Hatsumi Sonezaki
Hatsumi is Sōichiro's older brother's daughter and Yui's cousin. Hatsumi comes to the curry restaurant to check up on Yui, who was actually supposed to come live with her. Hatsumi reveals that she has no cooking talent and asks Yui to teach her to cook, but they both fail at making instant curry.
Urmila
Urmila is Makito Koenji's friend from high school when he lived in Singapore. Urmila is a Singaporean of Indian descent and enjoys studying and making curry with Makito.

== Publication ==
Written and illustrated by Kazuki Funatsu, Addicted to Curry was serialized in Shueisha's seinen manga magazine Weekly Young Jump from January 18, 2001, (Note: The series started in the magazine's seventh issue of 2001, released on January 18 of the same year.) to December 13, 2012. Shueisha collected its 534 chapters in forty-nine tankōbon volumes, released from July 19, 2001, to January 18, 2013.

== See also ==
- Dogeza: I Tried Asking While Kowtowing, another manga series by the same author
- Sundome!! Milky Way, another manga series by the same author
- Tsutte Tabetai Gal Sawa-san, another manga series by the same author
- Yokai Girls, another manga series by the same author
