= Grand Dolls =

Japanese manga series

- Cover of Grand Dolls from the Osamu Tezuka Manga Complete Works edition.

グランドール (Guran Dōru)
- Genre: Science fiction
- Manga
- Written by: Osamu Tezuka
- Published by: Shueisha, Kodansha
- Magazine: Shōnen Book
- Original run: January 1968 – September 1968
- Volumes: 1

Grand Dolls (グランドール, Guran Dōru) is a manga by Osamu Tezuka that began serialization in 1968.

== Plot ==
Tetsuo "Tecchin" Utsuki is a normal, everyday junior high school student. Without much willpower, he is often shy and unable to assert himself. His life changes one day when, on his way back from school, he finds the body of a dead girl lying in the street.

Rushing off to get the police, Tetsuo brings them to the spot where the girl was, only to find that she has disappeared. Instead, a strange, human-sized doll has taken the girl's place. Curious, Tetsuo takes the mysterious doll home and finds that a small bit of it is broken and repairs it. Instantly the doll transforms into the girl that Tetsuo had seen earlier.

Once active, the girl informs Tetsuo that she is a "Grand Doll". At first, a Grand Doll looks like a kind of ordinary, blank doll, but when the back of the neck is rubbed, the doll can take on the form of a human or a horse. Scratching the back of the neck turns them back into their doll forms.

However, the doll also informs Tetsuo that he himself is a Grand Doll. The dolls are part of an alien plot to invade Earth by secretly replacing human beings with dolls. Learning this, Tetsuo decides to take up the fight against the aliens. With his newspaper reporter father, and his friend Yoko Kashiwa, Tetsuo is determined to stop the alien threat (even if he's one of them, himself).

== Characters ==
- Tetsuo Utsuki: A junior high boy that is not very assertive, but determined to stop the alien invasion, even if he's one of the aliens himself.
- Yoko Kashiwa
- Tetsuo's Father: A newspaper reporter who helps Tetsuo discover the truth and stop the Grand Dolls.
- Tetsuo's Mother: Tetsuo's mother who may, or may not, have been switched with a Grand Doll.
- Sarumaru
- Grand Doll
- Yajiuma

== See also ==
- List of Osamu Tezuka manga
- Osamu Tezuka
- Osamu Tezuka's Star System
