= List of Tail of the Moon chapters =

Written and illustrated by Rinko Ueda, Tail of the Moon Prequel: The Other Hanzo(u) (月の吐息 愛の傷, Tsuki no Toiki no Ai no Kizu) was originally published as a oneshot in Margaret magazine in 2001, but was soon followed by another oneshot, Tsuki no Toiki Natsu no Yume (月の吐息 夏の夢) in 2002, and then the series, Tail of the Moon. The Tail of the Moon manga was serialized in Margaret from 2002 until its completion in 2007. Both the prequel and the series are licensed by Viz Media in North America for an English language release as part of their Shojo Beat line of manga. Viz also previewed the series in their now-defunct Shojo Beat magazine. The series is also licensed for release in Taiwan by Sharp Point Press. Beginning in October 2010, the series is being re-released as bunko editions in Japan.

== Volume List ==
No.	Original release date	Original ISBN	North America release date	North America ISBN
Prequel	September 25, 2002	4-08-847550-X	June 2, 2006	1-4215-3053-8
01	March 25, 2003	4-08-847611-5	October 3, 2006	1-4215-0764-1
02	July 25, 2003	4-08-847647-6	December 5, 2006	1-4215-0815-X
03	November 25, 2003	4-08-847683-2	February 6, 2007	1-4215-0814-1
04	March 25, 2004	4-08-847723-5	April 3, 2007	1-4215-0816-8
05	June 25, 2004	4-08-847752-9	June 5, 2007	1-4215-0817-6
06	October 25, 2004	4-08-847789-8	August 7, 2007	1-4215-1027-8
07	February 25, 2005	4-08-847824-X	October 7, 2007	1-4215-1028-6
08	June 25, 2005	4-08-847861-4	December 4, 2007	1-4215-1029-4
09	October 25, 2005	4-08-847895-9	February 5, 2008	1-4215-1540-7
10	February 24, 2006	4-08-846030-8	April 1, 2008	1-4215-1755-8
11	June 23, 2006	4-08-846065-0	June 3, 2008	1-4215-1756-6
12	October 25, 2006	4-08-846101-0	August 5, 2008	1-4215-1757-4
13	February 23, 2007	978-4-08-846139-7	October 7, 2008	1-4215-1953-4
14	May 25, 2007	978-4-08-846170-0	December 2, 2008	1-4215-2007-9
15	August 24, 2007	978-4-08-846202-8	February 3, 2009	1-4215-2377-9
