= Ayane Ukyō =

Japanese manga artist

- 右京 あやね
- Born: August 25; Aichi Prefecture, Japan
- Other name: Aya Sakyō (左京亜也)
- Occupation: Manga artist
- Years active: 1994–present
- Known for: B × B Brothers; Yokujō Climax; Kuroneko Kareshi
- Website: www.a-ukyo.com

Ayane Ukyō (右京 あやね, Ukyō Ayane) is a Japanese manga artist. Since 2010, Ukyō also publishes yaoi manga under the pseudonym Aya Sakyō (左京亜也).

== Works ==
=== Series ===
Year	Title	Magazine	Notes
1995	19XX Kageki-ha (19XXカゲキ派)	Margaret	
1998	Mondō Muyō! (問答無用!)	Margaret	—
2000	B × B Brothers (B×Bブラザーズ)	Margaret	
2004	Yokujō Climax (欲情©MAX)	Margaret	
2007	S.P.Y: Swim Paradise e Yōkoso (S.P.Y〜スイムパラダイスヘヨウコソ〜)	Margaret	
2008	Biyaku Cafe (媚薬カフェ)	Margaret	
2009	Nekoka Danshi no Shitsuketa (猫科男子のしつけ方)	Kaguya (2009-2010); Kaguya Spade (2010-2011); Wings (2011-2014)	
2010	Ikezu Kareshi no Otoshikata (イケズ彼氏の堕とし方)	Dear+	As Aya Sakyō
2010	Nekoka Kareshi no Ayashikata (ネコ科彼氏のあやし方)	Dear+	As Aya Sakyō
2012	Kuroneko Kareshi (クロネコ彼氏)	Dear+	As Aya Sakyō
2012	Hima na no de Hajimete Mimasu (ヒマなのでハジメテみます。)	Dear+	As Aya Sakyō
2014	Adolescence Boy & "It" (年頃のオトコノコとアレ, Toshigoro no Otokonoko to Are)	Chara Selection	As Aya Sakyō
2015	Fukigen Kareshi (不機嫌彼氏)	Dear+	As Aya Sakyō
2015	12-ji kara Hajimaru (12時からはじまる)	Dear+	As Aya Sakyō
2018	Scattering His Virgin Bloom; Takane no Hana wa, Chirasaretai (高嶺の花は、散らされたい)	Dear+	As Aya Sakyō

=== Short stories ===
Year	Title	Magazine	Notes
1994	Kodomo Janai Desho (子供じゃないでしょ)	Margaret	
1995	Onegai! Akuma (おねがい! 悪魔)	Margaret	
2011	Yaritai Otoko wa, Jibun de Erabu (やりたい男は、自分で選ぶ)	Margaret	Published in the anthology "Nishoku-kei Joshi" no Susume: Karada de Kanjiru Love Stories (〔肉食女子〕のススメ～カラダで感じるLOVE STORIES～)

=== Artbooks ===
No.	Title	Japanese release date	Japanese ISBN
1	Sakyō Aya Irasuto Shū: Kuroneko Zukan (左京亜也イラスト集 クロネコ図鑑)	November 11, 2016	978-4-403-65077-2

=== Illustrations ===
Year	Title	Notes
2013	Seito Kaichō ni Chūkoku Official Anthology	Contributing artist; as Aya Sakyō
2017	Ano Hi no Kimi to, Kyō no Boku (あの日の君と、今日の僕)	Illustrations; as Aya Sakyō
2017	Otameshi Hanayome, Kataomoichū (お試し花嫁、片恋中)	Illustrations; as Aya Sakyō
