= In the Clear Moonlit Dusk =

Japanese manga series

- First tankōbon volume cover

うるわしの宵の月 (Uruwashi no Yoi no Tsuki)
- Genre: Romance
- Manga
- Written by: Mika Yamamori
- Published by: Kodansha
- English publisher: NA: Kodansha USA
- Magazine: Dessert
- Original run: July 21, 2020 – present
- Volumes: 11
- Anime television series
- Directed by: Yūsuke Maruyama
- Written by: Ayumu Hisao
- Music by: Tsubasa Ito
- Studio: East Fish Studio; Atelier Peuplier
- Licensed by: Crunchyroll
- Original network: JNN (TBS)
- Original run: January 11, 2026 – March 29, 2026
- Episodes: 12
- Live-action film
- Directed by: Kentarō Takemura
- Written by: Yuichi Tokunaga
- Music by: Shū Kanematsu
- Studio: TBS Sparkle
- Released: October 23, 2026
- icon

In the Clear Moonlit Dusk (Japanese: うるわしの宵の月, Hepburn: Uruwashi no Yoi no Tsuki) is a Japanese manga series written and illustrated by Mika Yamamori. It began serialization in Dessert in July 2020. As of September 2026, the series' individual chapters have been collected into eleven volumes. An anime television series adaptation produced by East Fish Studio and Atelier Peuplier aired from January to March 2026. A live-action film adaptation premiered in October 2026.

== Plot ==
Yoi Takiguchi is a first-year high school student with a tall stature, deep voice, and a masculine appearance that often gets her mistaken for a handsome boy. At school, she is referred to as "Prince," and unintentionally earns the affection of some female schoolmates. Yoi seems to give up on changing this aspect of her life, as there isn't much she can do about her own appearance and other people's perception of her.

However, Yoi's daily life changes suddenly when she meets Kohaku Ichimura. Besides his own incredibly good looks, this boy is rumored to be very rich, and therefore is also called "Prince" by their schoolmates; likewise being on the receiving end of many female students' affections. Although he mistakes Yoi for a handsome boy just as many others have, he quickly develops a crush on her. Not only does Kohaku make an effort to get closer to Yoi, but he seems to notice a side of her that others don't.

After a series of interactions between the two, Kohaku offers Yoi an opportunity to try dating him as a test. Initially, she rejects him, but eventually she caves in and agrees, and after this development, the story continues to follow these two "princes" as they slowly reveal more of their true selves to each other.

== Characters ==
Yoi Takiguchi (滝口 宵, Takiguchi Yoi)
Voiced by: Rei Ichinomiya (Japanese); Michelle Rojas (English)
Portrayed by: Seira Anzai
Kohaku Ichimura (市村 琥珀, Ichimura Kohaku)
Voiced by: Ryōta Suzuki (Japanese); Joshua Waters (English)
Portrayed by: Shunsuke Michieda
Nobara Tone (利根 のばら, Tone Nobara)
Voiced by: Aya Yamane (Japanese); Mikaela Krantz (English)
Kotobuki Hibiya (日比谷 寿, Hibiya Kotobuki)
Voiced by: Momoko Seto (Japanese); Bev Mageto (English)
Sentarō Akane (茜 仙太郎, Akane Sentarō)
Voiced by: Shōta Hayama (Japanese); Chris Long (English)
Shun Kuwabatake (桑畑 春, Kuwabatake Shun)
Voiced by: Kentarō Kumagai (Japanese); Eli Farmer (English)
Takuto Ohji (大路拓人, Ohji Takuto)
Voiced by: Kensho Ono
Yoi's father (宵の父, Yoi no Chichi)
Voiced by: Kenjiro Tsuda

== Media ==
=== Manga ===
Written and illustrated by Mika Yamamori, the series began serialization in Dessert on July 21, 2020. As of September 2026, the series individual chapters have been collected into eleven tankōbon volumes. The series is set to end with the release of its twelfth volume in Q2 2027.

In June 2021, Kodansha USA announced that they licensed the series for English publication. In November 2021, Kodansha USA announced that the series would be released in print in Fall 2022.

==== Volumes ====
No.	Original release date	Original ISBN	English release date	English ISBN
1	December 11, 2020	978-4-06-521777-1	July 13, 2021 (digital); November 29, 2022 (print)	978-1-64-651494-6
2	May 13, 2021	978-4-06-523279-8	September 21, 2021 (digital); January 17, 2023 (print)	978-1-64-651495-3
3	November 12, 2021	978-4-06-525680-0	February 8, 2022 (digital); March 21, 2023 (print)	978-1-64-651648-3
4	May 13, 2022	978-4-06-527871-0	June 6, 2023	978-1-64-651705-3
5	November 11, 2022	978-4-06-529819-0	July 25, 2023	978-1-64-651706-0
6	May 12, 2023	978-4-06-531634-4	December 19, 2023	978-1-64-651899-9
7	October 13, 2023	978-4-06-533352-5	July 9, 2024	979-8-88-877053-5
8	August 9, 2024	978-4-06-536619-6	July 1, 2025	979-8-88-877481-6
9	May 13, 2025	978-4-06-539498-4; 978-4-06-539731-2 (SE)	April 14, 2026	979-8-88-877735-0
10	January 13, 2026	978-4-06-542095-9	—	—
11	September 11, 2026	978-4-06-544889-2	—	—

=== Anime ===
An anime television series adaptation was announced on May 9, 2025. It is produced by East Fish Studio and Atelier Peuplier, and directed by Yūsuke Maruyama, with scripts written by Ayumu Hisao, characters designed by Yuki Fukuda, and music composed by Tsubasa Ito. The series aired from January 11 to March 29, 2026, on TBS and its affiliates. The opening theme song is "Uruwashi" (うるわし; 'Beautiful'), and the ending theme song is "Azalea no Kaze" (アザレアの風; 'Azalea Wind'), both performed by Unison Square Garden. Crunchyroll is streaming the series.

==== Episodes ====
No.	Title	Directed by (Note: Production staff information is taken from the ending credits of each episode.)	Written by	Storyboarded by	Original release date
1	"Prince and Prince"; Transliteration: "Ōji to Ōji" (Japanese: 王子と王子)	Keisuke Warita	Ayumu Hisao	Yusuke Maruyama	January 11, 2026
2	"The Evening Downpour and the Cat"; Transliteration: "Yūdachi to Neko" (Japanese: 夕立と猫)	Keisuke Shiraishi	Ayumu Hisao	Keisuke Shiraishi	January 18, 2026
3	"Unawareness"; Transliteration: "Mujikaku" (Japanese: 無自覚)	Keisuke Warita	Naruhisa Arakawa	Keisuke Warita	January 25, 2026
4	"Temperature of Love"; Transliteration: "Koi no Ondo" (Japanese: 恋の温度)	Michiro Satō	Ayumu Hisao	Minoru Ohara	February 1, 2026
5	"The Side of Me I Don't Know"; Transliteration: "Shiranai watashi" (Japanese: 知らない私)	Keisuke Warita	Ayumu Hisao	Keisuke Warita	February 8, 2026
6	"I'm Just Jealous Is All."; Transliteration: "Yai Teru Dake" (Japanese: 妬いてるだけ)	Nobutaka Kondo	Kazuya Matsumoto	Takashi Iida	February 15, 2026
7	"You on the Night of the Festival"; Transliteration: "O matsuri no yoru no kimi" (Japanese: おまつりの夜の君)	Akiyoshi Watamari	Naruhisa Arakawa	Keisuke Shiraishi & Akiyoshi Watamari	February 22, 2026
8	"Earring"; Transliteration: "Iyaringu" (Japanese: イヤリング)	Keisuke Warita	Ayumu Hisao	Keisuke Warita	March 1, 2026
9	"A Goodnight Hug"; Transliteration: "Oyasumi no Hagu" (Japanese: おやすみのハグ)	Yūji Kanzaki	Naruhisa Arakawa	Takahiro Kawanami	March 8, 2026
10	"Another Prince"; Transliteration: "Mōhitori no Ōji" (Japanese: もう一人の王子)	Natsumi Higashida	Ayumu Hisao	Natsumi Higashida	March 15, 2026
11	"The Empty Room"; Transliteration: "Nanimonai Heya" (Japanese: 何もない部屋)	Keisuke Shiraishi	Ayumu Hisao	Keisuke Shiraishi	March 22, 2026
12	"In the Clear Moonlit Dusk"; Transliteration: "Uruwashi no yoi no tsuki" (Japanese: うるわしの宵の月)	Akiyoshi Watamari & Yusuke Maruyama	Ayumu Hisao	Tomomi Mochizuki	March 29, 2026

=== Live-action film ===
A live-action film adaptation was announced on February 16, 2026. It was produced by TBS Sparkle and directed by Kentarō Takemura, based on a screenplay by Yuichi Tokunaga. Shū Kanematsu composed the music, and Toho distributed the film. The film premiered on October 23, 2026.

== Reception ==
The series was nominated for the 2021 Next Manga Award on the print manga category. In the list of Da Vinci magazine's top 50 manga series of 2021, the series ranked 38th. The series won the semi-grand prize in the 2021 An An manga award. In the 2022 edition of the Kono Manga ga Sugoi! guidebook's top manga for female readers, the series ranked fourth. The series was nominated for the 46th Kodansha Manga Award in the shōjo manga category in 2022; it was also nominated in the same category for the 47th edition in 2023, the 48th edition in 2024, and the 50th edition in 2026. In the 2023 edition of the Kono Manga ga Sugoi! guidebook's top manga for female readers, the series ranked eleventh. The series won the Grand Prize of the 2023 edition of the ebookjapan Manga Award. It was nominated for the 70th Shogakukan Manga Award in 2024.

Rebecca Silverman from Anime News Network praised the major characters and the story, though she also felt the character designs could be inconsistent at times. Demelza from Anime UK News praised the story as unique and relatable and the artwork as clean and polished.

== See also ==
- Daytime Shooting Star, another manga series by the same author
- Tsubaki-chou Lonely Planet, another manga series by the same author
