= Sentimental Kiss =

Japanese manga series

- First tankōbon volume cover

センチメンタル キス (Senchimentaru Kisu)
- Genre: Romance
- Manga
- Written by: Mikko Komori
- Published by: Shueisha
- Imprint: Margaret Comics
- Magazine: Margaret
- Original run: April 20, 2020 – present
- Volumes: 15

Sentimental Kiss (センチメンタル キス, Senchimentaru Kisu) is a Japanese manga series written and illustrated by Mikko Komori. It began serialization in Shueisha's shōjo manga magazine Margaret in April 2020.

== Synopsis ==
Yuna Natsukawa is a college student who lives with her mother and younger sister, doing housework while also working part-time jobs. One day, when her younger sister tries to sneak into a party with alcohol, Yuna shows up at her school and later meets Hiyori Kuze, a student who is a member of the school's Kendo club. Due to Hiyori meeting Yuna while she was in school uniform, Hiyori mistakenly believes that she is a senior at his school, until he discovers that she is a college student.

== Publication ==
Written and illustrated by Mikko Komori, Sentimental Kiss began serialization in Shueisha's shōjo manga magazine Margaret on April 20, 2020. Its chapters have been collected in fifteen tankōbon volumes as of October 2026.

No.	Release date	ISBN
1	August 25, 2020	978-4-08-844368-3
2	December 24, 2020	978-4-08-844416-1
3	April 23, 2021	978-4-08-844448-2
4	September 24, 2021	978-4-08-844523-6
5	February 25, 2022	978-4-08-844588-5
6	July 25, 2022	978-4-08-844685-1
7	December 23, 2022	978-4-08-844728-5
8	April 25, 2023	978-4-08-844768-1
9	September 25, 2023	978-4-08-844814-5
10	February 22, 2024	978-4-08-844860-2
11	August 23, 2024	978-4-08-844883-1
12	May 23, 2025	978-4-08-843075-1
13	October 24, 2025	978-4-08-843188-8
14	April 23, 2026	978-4-08-843252-6
15	October 23, 2026	978-4-08-843308-0

== Reception ==
The series was ranked ninth in the Nationwide Publishers Recommended Comics of 2022 list.
