= Tsubaki-chou Lonely Planet =

Japanese manga series

- First tankōbon volume cover

椿町ロンリープラネット (Tsubaki-chō Ronrī Puranetto)
- Genre: Romance
- Manga
- Written by: Mika Yamamori
- Published by: Shueisha
- English publisher: NA: Yen Press
- Imprint: Margaret Comics
- Magazine: Margaret
- Original run: May 20, 2015 – March 20, 2019
- Volumes: 14

Tsubaki-chou Lonely Planet (椿町ロンリープラネット, Tsubaki-chō Ronrī Puranetto) is a Japanese manga series written and illustrated by Mika Yamamori. It was serialized in Shueisha's shōjo manga magazine Margaret from May 2015 to March 2019.

== Synopsis ==
In order to pay off her father's debts, Fumi Oono, a second year high school student, resorts to working as a housekeeper for the strict and unsociable novelist Akatsuki Kibikino.

== Characters ==
Fumi Oono (大野ふみ, Ōno Fumi)
Voiced by: Saori Hayami (voice drama)
Akatsuki Kibikino (木曳野暁, Kibikino Akatsuki)
Voiced by: Junichi Suwabe (voice drama)
Isshin Aioi (相生一心, Aioi Isshin)
Voiced by: Yuki Kaji (voice drama)
Gorou Kaneishi (金石悟郎, Kaneishi Gorō)
Voiced by: Yuichi Nakamura (voice drama)
Yoh Tobiume (飛梅洋, Tobiume Yō)
Voiced by: Yui Ishikawa (voice drama)

== Media ==
=== Manga ===
Written and illustrated by Mika Yamamori, Tsubaki-chou Lonely Planet was serialized in Shueisha's shōjo manga magazine Margaret from May 20, 2015, to March 20, 2019. Its chapters were compiled into fourteen tankōbon volumes released from August 25, 2015, to September 25, 2019. The series is licensed in English by Yen Press.

No.	Original release date	Original ISBN	North American release date	North American ISBN
1	August 25, 2015	978-4-08-845429-0	October 4, 2022	978-1-97-534620-1
2	November 25, 2015	978-4-08-845479-5	January 17, 2023	978-1-97-534622-5
3	March 25, 2016	978-4-08-845537-2	April 18, 2023	978-1-97-534624-9
4	June 24, 2016	978-4-08-845592-1	August 22, 2023	978-1-97-534626-3
5	September 23, 2016	978-4-08-845634-8	November 21, 2023	978-1-97-534628-7
6	December 22, 2016	978-4-08-845679-9	February 20, 2024	978-1-97-534630-0
7	March 24, 2017	978-4-08-845730-7	June 18, 2024	978-1-97-534632-4
8	July 25, 2017	978-4-08-845785-7	September 17, 2024	978-1-97-534634-8
9	November 24, 2017	978-4-08-845850-2	January 21, 2025	978-1-97-534636-2
10	March 23, 2018	978-4-08-844003-3	May 27, 2025	978-1-97-534638-6
11	July 25, 2018	978-4-08-844062-0	November 25, 2025	978-1-97-534640-9
12	November 22, 2018	978-4-08-844117-7	June 23, 2026	978-1-97-534642-3
13	March 25, 2019	978-4-08-844179-5	November 24, 2026	978-1-97-534644-7
14	September 25, 2019	978-4-08-844242-6	—	—

=== Other ===
Two voice drama adaptations were released in two separate issues of Margaret in 2019. The voice dramas featured the voices of Saori Hayami, Junichi Suwabe, Yuichi Nakamura, Yuki Kaji, and Yui Ishikawa.

== Reception ==
By September 2019, the series had over 4.3 million copies in circulation.

The series was ranked seventeenth in the 2020 edition of Takarajimasha's Kono Manga ga Sugoi! guidebook's list of the best manga for female readers.

== See also ==
- Daytime Shooting Star, another manga series by Mika Yamamori
- In the Clear Moonlit Dusk, another manga series by Mika Yamamori
