= Mixed Vegetables =

Romance manga by Ayumi Komura

- Cover of first manga volume

ミックスベジタブル (Mikkusu Bejitaburu)
- Genre: Cooking, romantic comedy
- Manga
- Written by: Ayumi Komura
- Published by: Shueisha
- English publisher: NA: Viz Media
- Magazine: Margaret
- English magazine: NA: Shojo Beat
- Original run: 25 October 2005 – 22 November 2007
- Volumes: 8

Mixed Vegetables (Japanese: ミックスベジタブル, Hepburn: Mikkusu Bejitaburu), also known as Mix Vegetable, is a Japanese manga series written and illustrated by Ayumi Komura. It was serialized in Japan by Shueisha in the shōjo manga magazine Margaret from 25 October 2005 to 22 November 2007, and collected in eight bound volumes. It is licensed in English in North America by Viz Media.

Mixed Vegetables is about the relationship between the daughter of a pastry chef who wants to become a sushi chef and the son of sushi chef who wants to become a pâtissier.

== Plot ==
The plot revolves around Hanayu Ashitaba, a chef in training. Hanayu is the daughter of the celebrated pastry shop, Patisserie Ashitaba, but all she wants to do is become a sushi chef. Hayato Hyuga is the son of the prestigious Sushi Hyuga, but he wants to be a pastry chef. They go to Oiwaka High School together. Hanayu knows she will break her parents' heart if she does not continue the bakery and become a pastry chef, but thinks if she marries Hayato, they will understand her decision.

== Main characters ==
- Hanayu Ashitaba is a 15-year-old pastry chef attending Oiwaka High and training to be a sushi chef. Although her family owns Patisserie Ashitaba, one of the most prestigious patisseries in Japan, she wants to become a sushi chef. She has a best friend named Ichii and a little brother named Natsume. Natsume takes after his father in the fact that he doesn't want any boys to come near his sister. She doesn't think that her parents will let her be a sushi chef because they want her to take over the shop (Natsume's dream is to be a baseball player, so she doesn't want to put the burden of being the owner of the shop on him), so she tries to get Hayato to fall in love with her by displaying her cooking skills.
- Hayato Hyuga is in the same class as Hanayu Ashitaba and Ichii at Oiwaka High, and even though his father owns the prestigious Sushidokoro Hyuga, his dream is to become a pastry chef. He appears to be very kind and very skilled with making sushi. He usually helps out at his family shop. When he was younger, he made cakes for his grandfather; It's stated that he doesn't have anyone else to taste his cakes anymore. Hanayu Ashitaba is very important to him, since he has told Hanayu about his dreams, reasons why he wanted to be a pastry chef, and about his grandfather. Hayato said he will give up his dream of being a pastry chef and take over Sushidokoro Hyugo.
- Maezawa is an assistant at Patisserie Ashitaba. Maezawa is nine years older than Hanayu. Ichii stated that Hanayu doesn't like anything but sushi and that it was unusual for her to express her dislike for Maezawa. Maezawa also has very sharp taste, as shown when he is testing Hayato's sushi and tells him to keep his emotions out of his food. Hayato tends to get jealous over Maezawa, assuming he wants to be in a relationship with Hanayu, however he later find out that Maezawa is already married.

== Manga ==
Mixed Vegetables is written and illustrated by Ayumi Komura. It was serialized in Japan by Shueisha in the biweekly shōjo (aimed at teenage girls) manga magazine Margaret starting with issue 10 of 2005 on 25 October, and running until issue 18 of 2007 on 22 November. The 54 untitled chapters, called "menus", were collected into eight tankōbon volumes. The series is licensed in English in North America by Viz Media, who has published all eight volumes.

No.	Original release date	Original ISBN	North America release date	North America ISBN
1	25 October 2005	4-08-847897-5	2 September 2008	1-4215-1967-4
Menu 1–7; Side-dish/End notes
2	24 March 2006	4-08-846039-1	2 December 2008	1-4215-1968-2
Menu 8–14; Side-dish/End notes
3	25 July 2006	4-08-846076-6	3 March 2009	1-4215-1969-0
Menu 15–21; Super Special; Side-dish/End notes
4	24 November 2006	4-08-846112-6	2 June 2009	1-4215-1970-4
Menu 22–28; Bonus manga; Side-dish/End notes
5	23 March 2007	978-4-08-846151-9	1 September 2009	1-4215-1971-2
Menu 29-34; Bonus manga; Side-dish/End notes
6	25 June 2007	978-4-08-846180-9	1 December 2009	1-4215-1982-8
Menu 35-40; Side-dish/End notes
7	25 September 2007	978-4-08-846209-7	6 April 2010	1-4215-3199-2
Menu 41-47; Mixed Vegetables Second Helpings; Bonus manga
8	22 November 2007	978-4-08-846231-8	6 July 2010	1-4215-3235-2
Menu 48-54

== Reception ==
Deb Aoki of About.com calls the series a "textbook (or rather, cookbook) example of the standard recipe for shojo manga romantic comedy." She dislikes Hanayu's character as well, calling her "selfish and dense." Carlo Santos of Anime News Network gives the first volume a B− for what he calls a dragging plot, but with a "A different sort of couple in a different sort of setting, with a lively sense of humor". Leroy Douresseaux of Comic Book Bin says that while the first volume isn't "standout material," the art and setting are "a recipe for a happy, romantic dish." Douresseaux gives volume 3 of the series an A for being "Beautifully drawn and heartfelt in its storytelling." He gives the following volume an A−. Holly Ellingwood of Active Anime says the characters are "likeable" and calls it an enjoyable read. Ellingwood calls the second volume a "tossed salad of emotions."
