= Pink & Habanero =

Japanese manga series

- First tankōbon volume cover

ピンクとハバネロ (Pinku to Habanero)
- Genre: Romantic comedy
- Manga
- Written by: Mika Satonaka
- Published by: Shueisha
- English publisher: NA: Yen Press
- Imprint: Margaret Comics
- Magazine: Margaret
- Original run: October 5, 2021 – October 3, 2025
- Volumes: 14
- icon

Pink & Habanero (Japanese: ピンクとハバネロ, Hepburn: Pinku to Habanero) is a Japanese manga series written and illustrated by Mika Satonaka. It was serialized in Shueisha's shōjo manga magazine Margaret from October 2021 to October 2025.

== Synopsis ==
The series follows Mugi Miyao, a socially awkward high school girl with no romantic experience. She develops a complicated relationship with her blunt, popular classmate, Kei Kurose, after discovering his secret part-time job at the "Knight Cafe", a cosplay café.

== Publication ==
Written and illustrated by Mika Satonaka, Pink & Habanero was serialized in Shueisha's shōjo manga magazine Margaret from October 5, 2021, to October 3, 2025. A 20-page side story was published on November 20, 2025. Shueisha has collected its chapters into fourteen tankōbon volumes, released from February 25, 2022, to November 25, 2025.

In March 2024, Yen Press announced that they had licensed the manga for English release in North America, with the first volume set to be released in September of the same year.

=== Volumes ===
No.	Original release date	Original ISBN	English release date	English ISBN
1	February 25, 2022	978-4-08-844598-4	September 17, 2024	978-1-97-539742-5
2	May 25, 2022	978-4-08-844608-0	January 21, 2025	978-1-97-539744-9
3	August 25, 2022	978-4-08-844712-4	May 27, 2025	978-1-97-539746-3
4	November 25, 2022	978-4-08-844719-3	October 28, 2025	978-1-97-539748-7
5	March 24, 2023	978-4-08-844763-6	May 26, 2026	978-1-97-539750-0
6	June 23, 2023	978-4-08-844781-0	November 24, 2026	978-1-97-539752-4
7	October 25, 2023	978-4-08-844813-8	—	—
8	February 22, 2024	978-4-08-844861-9	—	—
9	June 25, 2024	978-4-08-844882-4	—	—
10	September 25, 2024	978-4-08-843055-3	—	—
11	January 23, 2025	978-4-08-843086-7	—	—
12	May 23, 2025	978-4-08-843135-2	—	—
13	August 25, 2025	978-4-08-843177-2	—	—
14	November 25, 2025	978-4-08-843209-0	—	—

== Reception ==
The series ranked sixth in the Nationwide Bookstore Employees' Recommended Comics of 2023.
