= A Sign of Affection =

Japanese manga series

- First tankōbon volume cover, featuring Yuki Itose (left) and Itsoumi Nagi (right)

ゆびさきと恋々 (Yubisaki to Renren)
- Genre: Drama, romance
- Manga
- Written by: Suu Morishita
- Published by: Kodansha
- English publisher: NA: Kodansha USA
- Magazine: Dessert
- Original run: July 24, 2019 – present
- Volumes: 14
- Anime television series
- Directed by: Yūta Murano
- Written by: Yōko Yonaiyama
- Music by: Yukari Hashimoto
- Studio: Ajiado
- Licensed by: Crunchyroll: SEA: Muse Communication
- Original network: Tokyo MX, MBS, BS NTV, AT-X
- Original run: January 6, 2024 – March 23, 2024
- Episodes: 12
- icon

A Sign of Affection (Japanese: ゆびさきと恋々, Hepburn: Yubisaki to Renren; lit. 'Fingertips and Affection') is a Japanese manga series written and illustrated by Suu Morishita. It started serialization in Kodansha's Dessert magazine in July 2019. As of May 2026, fourteen tankōbon volumes have been released. An anime television series adaptation produced by Ajiado aired from January to March 2024.

== Plot ==
Yuki Itose is a university student with congenital hearing loss. Besides sign language, she communicates through text and lip reading. When a foreigner asked her for direction in a language she assumed was English, a young man comes to her aid and catches Yuki's attention. The story revolves around Yuki as she narrates her silent world. Her world revolves mainly around her relationships, and specifically it explores the developing feelings between Yuki and Itsuomi. Their worlds are completely different yet they grow and learn about each other's world. Yuki living in a silent and confined world and Itsuomi living in a very worldly way. Although he knows three languages fluently, he decides to learn the language of Yuki's world.

== Characters ==
Yuki Itose (糸瀬 雪, Itose Yuki)
Voiced by: Sumire Morohoshi (Japanese); Lara Woodhull (English)
A 19-year-old timid deaf girl who attended a school for the deaf until high school and enrolled in public university. She meets Itsuomi on the train and falls in love with him after they spend time together.
Itsuomi Nagi (波岐 逸臣, Nagi Itsuomi)
Voiced by: Yu Miyazaki (Japanese); Reagan Murdock (English)
A 22-year-old multilingual young man who often travels abroad. He is a senior at Yuki's university who developed a crush on her the moment he met her on the train.
Ōshi Ashioki (芦沖 桜志, Ashioki Ōshi)
Voiced by: Takeo Ōtsuka (Japanese); Nazeeh Tarsha (English)
Yuki's childhood friend who can use sign language to communicate. He is very protective of Yuki, much to her annoyance. He has been in love with Yuki since childhood, which explains his controlling behavior towards her, but has kept his feelings to himself since he knows she does not like him.
Kyōya Nagi (波岐 京弥, Nagi Kyōya)
Voiced by: Ryōta Ōsaka (Japanese); Kamen Casey (English)
Itsuomi's older cousin who runs a bar. He supports his cousin's relationship with Yuki, and it is strongly implied he may harbor secret feelings for Rin.
Rin Fujishiro (藤白 りん, Fujishiro Rin)
Voiced by: Kaede Hondo (Japanese); Rebecca Danae (English)
Yuki's best friend, who helps her take notes at classes. She is very supportive of Yuki's love for Itsuomi. She has a crush on Kyōya.
Emma Nakazono (中園 エマ, Nakazono Ema)
Voiced by: Nao Tōyama (Japanese); Julie Shields (English)
Itsuomi's friend who has been in love with him since high school, even though he never reciprocated. She often tries to get close to Itsuomi, who pushes her away every time. Her love for him is very obvious, and was quickly noticed by Yuki, who was initially suspicious. Eventually, Emma is able to move on from her hopeless crush on Itsuomi and begins to date Shin.
Shin Iryū (伊柳 心, Iryū Shin)
Voiced by: Tasuku Hatanaka (Japanese); Ethan Gallardo (English)
Itsuomi and Emma's best friend who works at a hair salon. He has been secretly in love with Emma since high school, even though she never noticed.

Madoka Sakurase (桜瀬 まどか, Sakurase Madoka)

Voiced by: Hana Hishikawa (Japanese); Monica Flatley (English)
Yuki's childhood friend who gets Yuki a job with Madoka's aunt. She is deaf and has acquired deafness. This character both speaks and uses sign.

Izumi Yoshiki (泉義樹, Yoshiki Izumi)

Voiced by: Minami Takahashi (Japanese); Jill Harris (English)
She is a supporting character. She is friends with Oushi and has a one-sided crush on him for a majority of the show.

Mio Ashioki (芦沖 実桜, Ashioki Mio)

Voiced by: Umeka Shoji (Japanese); Dani Chambers (English).
She is a supporting character. She is Oushi's older sister and used to be friends with Yuki when they were children, even learning sign language.

== Development ==
In an interview with Kodansha USA, the author duo Suu Morishita stated that they decided to make the main theme sign language since they were both interested in the idea. However, since neither of them had much experience with sign language, they did research, which included reading books on the subject, interviewing teachers, and getting someone to supervise how it was used.

Yuki Miyazaki was a main component of their ability to represent the sign language in an accurate way. She is a Deaf person who gave insight into daily life as a person in that community and supervised the use sign language in the work and process.

When it came to the art, they decided to use Copic Multiliner brown markers for the outlines and Dr. Ph. Martin's color ink for the coloring because they felt it gave the art a "soft and delicate" style.

== Media ==
=== Manga ===
The series is written and illustrated by the author duo Suu Morishita. It started serialization in Dessert on July 24, 2019. On June 24, 2021, it was announced the manga would go on a hiatus as the writer and storyboarder gave birth to a child. The manga returned in November 2021. In November 2026, it was announced that the series would end in three chapters. As of May 2026, fourteen tankōbon volumes have been released.

In March 2020, Kodansha USA announced they licensed the manga for English publication digitally. At Anime Expo Lite in July 2020, they announced a print release for the series. Later that month, they announced they would publish chapters of the series digitally simultaneously with the Japanese release. Kodansha's K Manga added the series to its simultaneous-publication catalogue in August 2023 after the series had been removed from Kodansha USA services in January. Starting from April 2024, Kodansha USA began additionally releasing 3-in-1 omnibus versions of the manga. The series was also translated into French by Rosalys and published by Akata.

==== Volumes ====
| No. | Original release date | Original ISBN | English release date | English ISBN |
|---|---|---|---|---|
| 1 | December 13, 2019 | 978-4-06-518062-4 | March 31, 2020 (digital); February 23, 2021 (print) | 978-1-64651-184-6 |
1. "The World of Yuki" (雪の世界, Yuki no Sekai); 2. "Toward Affection" (恋々へ, Renren e); 3. "Unseen" (みえない, Mienai); 4. "More" (もっと, Motto)
| 2 | May 13, 2020 | 978-4-06-519501-7 | July 7, 2020 (digital); May 18, 2021 (print) | 978-1-64651-185-3 |
5. "Someone is Thinking of Someone"; 6. "Voices and Wavelengths" (声と波長, Koe to Hachō); 7. "Want to Show Her, and Want Him to See Me" (見せたいとみてほしい, Misetai to Mite Hoshī); 8. "The Answer" (こたえ, Kotae)
| 3 | October 13, 2020 | 978-4-06-520971-4 | December 29, 2020 (digital); August 10, 2021 (print) | 978-1-64651-218-8 |
9. "I Always Want to Be Watching Her" (ずっと見ていたいって思ってた, Zutto-mi Teita Itte Omotteta); 10. "February 21st" (2月21日, 2 tsuki 21-nichi); 11. "Far & Near" (遠くと近く, Tōku to Chikaku); 12. "Coming Home" (帰国, Kikoku)
| 4 | March 12, 2021 | 978-4-06-522634-6 | August 31, 2021 (digital); January 11, 2022 (print) | 978-1-64651-274-4 |
13. "Let Me Introduce You to My Girlfriend"; 14. "Sign Language Training Camp" (手話合宿, Shuwa Gasshuku); 15. "I Don't Want to Go Home" (帰りたくない, Kaeritakunai); 16. "Precious" (大事, Daiji)
| 5 | September 13, 2021 | 978-4-06-524820-1 | December 14, 2021 (digital); June 28, 2022 (print) | 978-1-64651-418-2 |
17. "Oushi's World" (桜志の世界, Oushi no Sekai); 18. "A Shift" (移ろい, Utsuroi); 19. "The Night I Want to See You" (会いたい夜, Aitai Yoru); 20. "A Destination Together" (ふたりのゆく先, Futari no Yuku Saki)
| 6 | March 11, 2022 | 978-4-06-527138-4 | July 5, 2022 (digital); May 23, 2023 (print) | 978-1-64651-683-4 |
21. "Resolution" (志, Kokorozashi); 22. "Cloudy Followed By..." (曇り、のちに, Kumori, Nochi ni); 23. "Childhood Friends and Friends" (幼なじみと友達, Osananajimi to tomodachi); 24. "sweet night"; Special Bonus Chapter: "Returning Home Routine" (帰国ルーティン, Kikoku Rūtin)
| 7 | September 13, 2022 | 978-4-06-529176-4; 978-4-06-529026-2 (limited edition) | October 24, 2023 (digital); November 14, 2023 (print) | 978-1-64651-883-8 |
25. "The Proposal" (提案, Teian); 26. "Yawns & Sighs" (あくびとため息, Akubi to Tameiki); 27. "The Curtain Rises on Mitoki Theater" (深時劇場開幕, Fuka Toki Gekijō Kaimaku); 28. "Can I Tell You How I Feel?" (私の気持ちを伝えてもいいですか？, Watashi no Kimochi o Tsutaete Moī Desuka?)
| 8 | February 13, 2023 | 978-4-06-530723-6 | April 23, 2024 (digital); May 14, 2024 (print) | 979-8-88877-005-4 |
29. "Intimate Tears" (近しい涙, Chikashī namida); 30. "He Rings the Doorbell with Gusto" (勢いよくチャイムを鳴らす彼, Ikioi Yoku Chaimu o Narasu Kare); 31. "Public Bath and Hot Spring" (銭湯と温泉, Sentō to Onsen); 32. " I Wants Us to Be Together" (一緒にいたい, Issho ni Itai)
| 9 | July 13, 2023 | 978-4-06-531847-8 | July 23, 2024 | 979-8-88877-024-5 |
33. "hand sign" 34. "Contracts & Oaths" (契約と誓約, Keiyaku to Seiyaku); 35. "Guideposts of Light" (光の道標, Hikari no Michishirube); 36. "Secret Words" (ひみつの言葉, Himitsu no Kotoba)
| 10 | December 13, 2023 | 978-4-06-534044-8 | October 22, 2024 | 979-8-88877-279-9 |
37. "A Happy Cohabitation" (幸せな同棲, Shiawase na Dōsei); 38. "Galbi Cold Noodles, Oushi, and Shin" (カルビ冷麺、桜志と心, Karubi Reimen, Oushi to Shin); 39. "When He Comes Home" (彼氏の帰宅, Kareshi no Kitaku); 40. "Bloodshed and the Past" (流血と過去, Ryūketsu to Kako)
| 11 | July 11, 2024 | 978-4-06-536193-1 | June 3, 2025 | 979-8-88877-471-7 |
41. "The Opposite of Hate" (嫌いの反対の話, Kirai no Hantai no Hanashi); 42. "Itsuomi's World: Part I" (逸臣の世界：前編, Itsuomi no Sekai: Zenpen); 43. "Itsuomi's World: Part II" (逸臣の世界：後編, Itsuomi no Sekai: Kōhen); 44. "The Two Who Met" (出会えたふたり, Deaeta Futari); Special Extra: "A Sign of Affection TV Anime Dubbing Report" (TVアニメ『ゆびさきと恋々』アフレコレポ, TV anime 'Yubisaki to renren' furekorepo)
| 12 | February 13, 2025 | 978-4-06-538493-0 | December 2, 2025 | 979-8-88877-512-7 |
45. "Wondering at the Theme Park" (知りたい遊園地, Hiritai Yuenchi); 46. "Fireworks on the Ferris Wheel with Yuki" (雪と花火の観覧車, Yuki to Hanabi no Kanran-sha); 47. "Oushi and "Itsuomi"" (桜志と「逸臣」, Oushi to "Itsuomi"); 48. "A Loving Gaze" (愛のまなざし, Ai no Manazashi)
| 13 | November 13, 2025 | 978-4-06-541478-1 | December 8, 2026 | 979-8-88-877968-2 |
49. "♡&☆" (♡と☆); 50. "So far, so good."; 51. "September 1" (9月1日, 9-tsuki 1-nichi); 52. "Jealousy x Jealousy" (やきもち × やきもち, Yaki Mochi × Yaki Mochi)
| 14 | May 13, 2026 | 978-4-06-543500-7; 978-4-06-543708-7 (limited edition) | — | — |
53. "Before Leaving the Country" (出国前, Shukkoku Mae); 54. "Have a Nice Trip!"; 55. "Sweetheart of the Sky, Childhood Friend of the Water" (空の恋人、水の幼なじみ, Sora no koibito, Mizu no Osananajimi); 56. "Yuki & Itsuomi's World" (雪と逸臣の世界, Yuki to Itsuomi no Sekai)
| 15 | December 11, 2026 | 978-4-06-546062-7; 978-4-06-546060-3 (limited edition) | — | — |

==== Chapters not yet in tankōbon format ====
These chapters have yet to be published in a tankōbon volume.

57. "A Good Match" (良縁, Ryōen)
58. "A Secret" (秘めごと, Himegoto)
59. "Yuki & Emma" (雪とエマ, Yuki to Ema)

=== Musical ===
A stage musical adaptation, titled A New Musical: A Sign of Affection, ran in the Honda Theater in Tokyo from June 4 to June 13, 2021. It was directed by Maiko Tanaka, with Sanae Iijima writing the screenplay, Kiyoko Ogino composing the music, and Kiyomi Maeda in charge of choreography. It starred Erika Toyohara as Yuki, Takahisa Maeyama as Itsuomi, Manatsu Hayashi as Rin, Saho Aono as Ema, Ryōsuke Ikeoka as Ōshi, Kodai Miyagi as Shin, and Ryuji Kamiyama as Kyōya. A recording of the musical was broadcast on the Japanese television channel Eisei Gekijō on October 10, 2021.

=== Anime ===
An anime television series adaptation was announced on July 5, 2023. It was produced by Ajiado and directed by Yūta Murano, with Yōko Yonaiyama writing the scripts, Kasumi Sakai designing the characters, and Yukari Hashimoto composing the music. The series aired from January 6 to March 23, 2024, on Tokyo MX and other networks. The opening theme song is "Yuki no Ne" (雪の音; "The Sound of Snow"), performed by Novelbright, while the ending theme song is "Snowspring", performed by ChoQMay. Crunchyroll streamed the series worldwide outside of East Asia. Muse Communication licensed the series in Southeast Asia.

==== Episodes ====
| No. | Title (Note: All English titles are taken from Crunchyroll.) | Directed by (Note: Information is taken from the ending credits of each episode.) | Original release date |
|---|---|---|---|
| 1 | "Yuki's World"; Transliteration: "Yuki no Sekai" (Japanese: 雪の世界) | Yūta Murano | January 6, 2024 |
| 2 | "To Affection"; Transliteration: "Renren e" (Japanese: 恋々へ) | Shinpei Matsuo | January 13, 2024 |
| 3 | "Someone is thinking of someone" | Susumu Yamamoto | January 20, 2024 |
| 4 | "What Kind of Voice?"; Transliteration: "Donna Koe de" (Japanese: どんな声で) | Shun Watanabe | January 27, 2024 |
| 5 | "The Answer"; Transliteration: "Kotae" (Japanese: こたえ) | Hidekazu Oka | February 3, 2024 |
| 6 | "I Thought I Wanted to Keep Watching Her Forever"; Transliteration: "Zutto Miteitai tte Omotteta" (Japanese: ずっと見ていたいって思ってた) | Shinpei Matsuo | February 10, 2024 |
| 7 | "Let me introduce you to my girlfriend" | Shun Watanabe | February 17, 2024 |
| 8 | "One Small Step"; Transliteration: "Ippo o" (Japanese: 一歩を) | Yūta Murano | February 24, 2024 |
| 9 | "I Don't Want to Leave"; Transliteration: "Kaeritakunai" (Japanese: 帰りたくない) | Hidekazu Oka & Shinpei Matsuo | March 2, 2024 |
| 10 | "Oushi's World"; Transliteration: "Ōshi no Sekai" (Japanese: 桜志の世界) | Tatsuya Fujinaka | March 9, 2024 |
| 11 | "Promise"; Transliteration: "Yakusoku" (Japanese: 約束) | Shun Watanabe | March 16, 2024 |
| 12 | "Our World"; Transliteration: "Watashitachi no Sekai" (Japanese: 私たちの世界) | Yūta Murano | March 23, 2024 |

== Reception ==
The series ranked 17th in the 2020 Next Manga Award. It ranked ninth in the 2021 edition of the Kono Manga ga Sugoi! guidebook's top 20 Manga for female readers. Also that year the series was nominated for the 45th Kodansha Manga Award in the shōjo category; it was nominated for the 46th edition in the same category in 2022; for the 47th edition in 2023; and the 48th edition in 2024. The manga was also nominated for the first Ebook Japan manga award. The manga also won the grand prize at the eleventh An An manga award. The manga has been nominated for the 68th Shogakukan Manga Award in the Shōjo category. The Volume 14 of the manga ranked first on Billboard Japan's weekly Book 100 ranking on May 16, 2026.

The series has received widespread critical acclaim. Sean Gaffney from Manga Bookshelf gave the first volume praise, calling it an "excellent debut" and stating he wanted to read more. Koiwai from Manga News also praised it. Like Gaffney and Koiwai, Darkstorm from Anime UK News also gave the first volume praise, comparing it to A Silent Voice, as well as calling it "beautifully drawn and written".

The anime was nominated at the 9th Crunchyroll Anime Awards in three categories: "Must Protect at All Costs" Character (Yuki Itose), Best Romance, and Best Drama.

== See also ==
- Like a Butterfly, another manga series by the same author duo
- Shortcake Cake, another manga series by the same author duo
