= Hinako Sakurai =

Japanese actress, model and tarento (born 1997)

- 桜井 日奈子
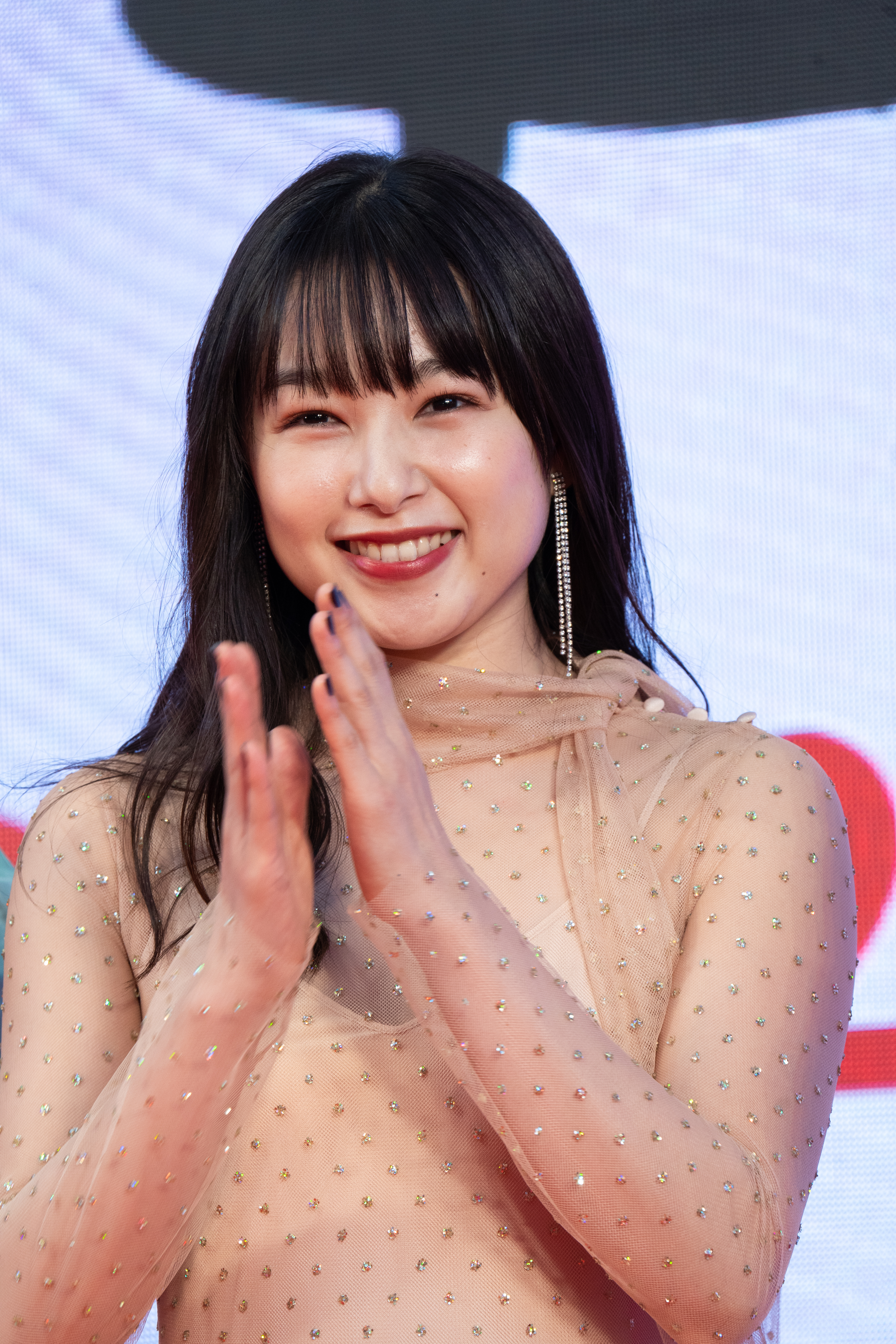
- Sakurai in 2019
- Born: April 2, 1997 (age 29); Okayama Prefecture, Japan
- Occupations: Model; actress
- Years active: 2014–present
- Agent: Incent

Hinako Sakurai (桜井 日奈子, Sakurai Hinako; born 2 April 1997, in Okayama, Okayama Prefecture, Japan) is a Japanese actress, model and tarento who has appeared in a number of feature films and television programmes. Sakurai is represented with Incent.

== Biography ==
Sakurai's acting debut was in the play Soreiyu in May 2016. Later in July her first drama appearance was in Nippon TV's Soshite, Dare mo inaku natta.

== Filmography ==
=== TV series ===
Year	Title	Role	Notes	Ref.
2016	Soshite, Dare mo inaku natta	Saori Kimiie		
2016	The Last Cop	Nanako Mishima		
2019	Secret Unrequited Love	Mayu Taneda		
2020	Furo Girl!	Sayoko Oyumino	Lead role	
2021	Mairunovich	Mairu Kinoshita	Lead role	

=== Film ===
Year	Title	Role	Notes	Ref.
2017	Last Cop: The Movie	Nanako Mishima		
2018	Marmalade Boy	Miki Koishikawa	Lead role	
2018	You, I Love	Yū Haruna		
2019	He Won't Kill, She Won't Die	Nana Shikano	Lead role	
2019	Ninkyō Gakuen	Misaki		
2023	Majo no Kōsui	Ema Wakabayashi		
2023	Kingdom 3: The Flame of Destiny	Dong Mei		
2024	Kingdom 4: Return of the Great General	Dong Mei		
2024	Saint Young Men: The Movie	Mara's second oldest daughter		
2026	Sakamoto Days	Obiguro		
2026	Grim Reaper Barber	Miho Saeki	Lead role	

=== Japanese dub ===
Year	Title	Role	Voice dub for	Notes	Ref.
2017	Transformers: The Last Knight	Isabela	Isabela Moner		

=== Stage ===
Year	Title	Role	Ref.
2016	Soreiyu	Maiko Okochi	

== Bibliography ==
Year	Title	Ref.
2016	Shashin-shū: Hinako Sakurai desu.	
2017	Hinako Sakurai CM MAKING PHOTO BOOK	
