= Rosalys =

French author and illustrator

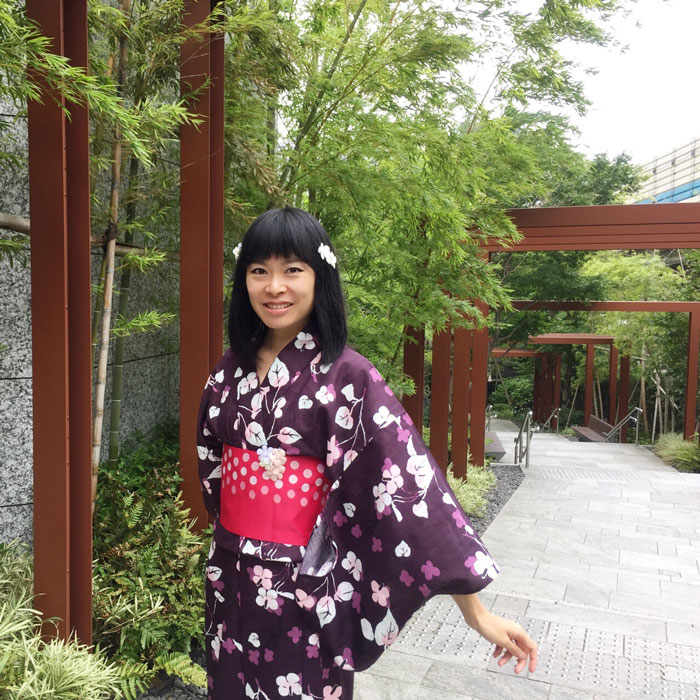
- Rosalys in 2015
- Occupations: Illustrator, author, publisher, translator
- Writing career
- Period: 2008 – present
- Subjects: Novel, artbook, children's book, painting
- Website: www.rosalys.net

Rosalys (French pronunciation: [rozalis]) is a French illustrator, author, publisher, videographer and translator.

== Career ==
Rosalys is a graphic artist of Chinese descent with a passion for Japan. She has worked the artist name "Rosalys" since 2008. She was known as "SaturnAlice" from 1999 to 2007, a period when she published manga and illustrations in various dōjinshi.

In 2012, she founded the publishing house Univers partagés editions, which she continues to run as its art director.

She started her YouTube channel in 2015.

She has been the French translator of the Japanese manga series A Sign of Affection since 2020.

== Publications ==
=== Novels ===
- Rosalys (2021). Le voyage de Hana, dans un autre monde – tome 1 – Harry sur l'île aux animaux tranquilles. Univers partagés éditions. ISBN 978-2-36750-073-7.
- Le voyage de Hana, Stories – tome 1 – Anecdotes au soleil levant, Rosalys, Univers partagés éditions, 2020. ISBN 978-2-36750-070-6.
- Le voyage de Hana – tome 3 – Fraisie au pays des wagashi, Rosalys, Univers partagés éditions, 2019. ISBN 978-2-36750-067-6.
- Le voyage de Hana – tome 2 – Floraison des cerisiers au Japon, de Tōkyō à Kyōto, Rosalys, Univers partagés éditions, 2018. ISBN 978-2-36750-064-5.
- Le voyage de Hana - tome 1 - Premier envol vers le Japon : destination Tōkyō, Rosalys, Univers partagés editions, 2017. ISBN 978-2-36750-060-7

=== Artbooks ===
- Fluffy cuties, shiba, Rosalys, Univers partagés editions, 2024. ISBN 978-2-36750-080-5
- Fluffy cuties, Rosalys, Univers partagés editions, 2023. ISBN 978-2-36750-079-9
- Gourmandises japonaises, Rosalys, Univers partagés editions, 2015. ISBN 978-2-36750-037-9
- Princesses & Lolitas, Rosalys, Booklight editions, 2011. ISBN 978-2-9538357-1-7
- Cute flowers, Rosalys, BD associées editions, 2009. ISBN 978-2-9534734-0-7

==== Coloring books ====
- Le voyage de Hana Coloriage, Rosalys, Univers partagés editions, 2022. ISBN 978-2-36750-077-5
- Gourmandises japonaises Coloriage, Rosalys, Univers partagés editions, 2015. ISBN 978-2-36750-045-4

==== Collective artbooks ====
- Drakaina : Masters, Collective, SQP publishing, 2010.

=== Children's books ===
- Divines, Les beautés de la mythologie classique', Rosalys (texts), Fleur D. (illustrations), Univers partagés editions, 2012. ISBN 978-2-36750-013-3
- Fraisie, la magie de la pâtisserie, Rosalys, Univers partagés editions, 2012. ISBN 978-2-9540937-5-8
  - フレジー、お菓子の魔法, Japanese translation Univers partagés editions, 2012. ISBN 978-2-36750-006-5
  - Berrie, the Magic of Pastry, English translation Univers partagés editions, 2012. ISBN 978-2-36750-001-0
- Toujours près de mon coeur, Rosalys (texts), Laure Phelipon (illustrations), Samsara editions, 2011. ISBN 978-2-918245-23-0
- Un conte pour la Lune, Clementine Ferry (texts), Rosalys (illustrations), Chouetteditions, 2011. ISBN 978-2-89687-190-2
- J'aime *, Rosalys, Poisson Borgne editions, 2010. ISBN 978-2-917331-09-5
- Mon amie, Honorine la souris, Laetitia Etienne (texts), Rosalys (illustrations), Chouetteditions, 2010. ISBN 978-2-923834-56-6
  - My little friend Honorine, English translation, Chouetteditions, 2010.
- Rêves de lapinou, Rosalys (texts), Sandrine Fourrier (illustrations), Chouetteditions, 2010. ISBN 978-2-923834-94-8

==== Collective children's books ====
- Mes jolies histoires de princesses, Collective, Hemma editions, 2020. ISBN 978-2-50804-617-9
- Les princesses et moi tome 4, Collective, Hemma editions, 2016. ISBN 978-2-50803-402-2
- 16 histoires de belles princesses, Collective, Hemma editions, 2011. ISBN 978-2-508-01300-3

=== Manga/comic books ===
- Workaholic, Morgan Magnin (author), Rosalys (illustrations), Univers Partagés editions, 2012. ISBN 978-2-9540937-0-3
- Workaholic English edition, English version of Workaholic, Univers Partagés editions, 2012. ISBN 978-2-9540937-1-0
- Fly for fun (adaptation of the MMORPG Flyff), Rosalys, Foolstrip editions in partnership with Gala Networks, 2008-2009. ISBN 978-2-917713-80-8

=== Dōjinshi ===
- Happy life in Japan #1.0, 2015.
- JolieCure, 2014.
- Uni, 2011.
- Chibi three, 2000.
- Usa-usa, 1999.

==== Participations, collective fanzines ====
- Paris-Kyoto, 2020.
- Tribute to Tsukasa Hôjô, 2010.
- Tribute to CLAMP, 2009.
- Yamano-world, 2005.
- White & black galerie, 2004.
- PlayElf, 2004.
- Mizono, 2000.

=== Collections of illustrations ===
- Fruits & couleurs, 2010, series of paintings on canvas paper for exhibition Rosalys, 33 x 41 cm
- Langage of flowers, 2010, series of digigraphies for exhibition Rosalys, 30 x 30 cm
- Zodiac signs, 2010, series of digigraphies for exhibition Rosalys at La Gallery Montreal, 30 x 30 cm
- Lolita, 2010, series of fine art prints for collective exhibition with Poisson Borgne editions, 21 x 29,7 cm
- Dark hair, 2009, series of acrylic paintings for exhibition Rosalys, 46 x 55 cm

=== Translation of manga ===
- A Sign of Affection – tome 1, suu Morishita, Rosalys, Akata editions, 2021.ISBN 978-2-38212-025-5.
- A sign of affection – tome 2, suu Morishita, Rosalys, Akata editions, 2021.ISBN 978-2-38212-050-7.
- A sign of affection – tome 3, suu Morishita, Rosalys, Akata editions, 2021.ISBN 978-2-38212-071-2.
- A sign of affection – tome 4, suu Morishita, Rosalys, Akata editions, 2021.ISBN 978-2-38212-204-4.
- A sign of affection – tome 5, suu Morishita, Rosalys, Akata editions, 2022.ISBN 978-2-38212-249-5.
