= Parfait Tic! =

Japanese manga series

- Cover of Parfait Tic! volume 9 as published by Shueisha, depicting (right to left) Daiya, Fuuko & Ichi

パフェちっく! (Pafe Chikku!)
- Genre: Romantic comedy
- Manga
- Written by: Nagamu Nanaji
- Published by: Shueisha
- English publisher: Shueisha (digital)
- Magazine: Margaret
- Original run: 2000 – 2007
- Volumes: 22

Parfait Tic! (パフェちっく!, Pafe Chikku!), also known as Parfait Chic, is a Japanese shōjo manga by Nagamu Nanaji. It was published by Shueisha in Margaret from 2000 to 2007 and collected in 22 volumes. The story revolves around the lives of a girl and two boys who are cousins, and their love triangle.

The manga became licensed digitally in English on Shueisha's Manga Million platform as Parfait Chic in 2026. It is published in China by Jade Dynasty, in France by Panini Comics, in Indonesia by Elex Media, and in Italy by Star Comics.

== Story ==
Fuuko (or Fuu-chan for friends) is a lively girl starting her first year of high school. Her life is turned upside down by the arrival of her new neighbors: the bishōnen Shinpo cousins, Daiya and Ichi.

Fuuko initially falls for the playboy Daiya. Unfortunately, her first love is an unrequited love. Daiya claims he does not know what 'being in love' feels like. Suffering from her first heartbreak, she receives unexpected support from Ichi. Although he seems cold, Ichi actually is in love with Fuuko. The two spend more and more time together, and Fuuko discovers she has feelings for Ichi too. Only 'official' confessions away from being a couple, a woman from Ichi's past shows up. Iori-san used to work for the Shinpo family company. Back then, Ichi had fallen in love with her (even though she had a boyfriend, and was some years older than he was). His infatuation was big enough to worry his parents, who had her fired. Now that she's back in his life, Ichi's feelings turn to her again. Not even his budding relationship with Fuuko can lessen his need to be with Iori. Fuuko can't deal with this and they part ways. Fuuko is heartbroken again, but this time the pain runs much deeper. Her love for Ichi was more serious than her former crush on Daiya. Ironically, it's Daiya who supports her through these hard times. Ichi spends his free time with Iori, and Daiya tries his hardest to distract Fuuko. Slowly, Daiya is beginning to understand 'what it is to be in love', as he is falling in love with Fuuko. But she can't return his feelings, she is not over Ichi yet. At New Year, Daiya asks Fuuko if she wants to go out with him. Taking a fresh start, Fuuko accepts. Meanwhile, Ichi says goodbye to Iori, as he finally understands she only sees him as a little brother, while the one she really loves is her boyfriend. At a class cleanup, Fuuko accidentally kissed Ichi and felt guilty towards Daiya. When Daiya finally found out, he was upset that Fuuko didn't trust in their relationship enough to tell him right away. Fuuko started to knit a hat for Valentine's Day for Daiya without knowing whether she would get a chance to give it to him. Their relationship got stronger after Fuuko confessed to Daiya at that she was only thinking about him when knitting the hat at the hospital after Daiya's accident.

== Characters ==
Fuuko Kameyama
The upbeat main character. She likes playing with little children and hairstyling. Wears her own hair in unusual and complicated styles. She does feel insecure about her looks, especially when being compared to Daiya and Ichi. Had to take swimming lessons from Ichi in order to pass P.E. In the beginning, Fuuko had a big crush on Daiya but when she confessed he rejected her kindly. Ichi helped her to mend her inner wounds and she fell genuinely in love with him, but at the same time, Daiya was falling in love with her. Although Ichi loved Fuuko, his old feelings for Iori returned so he chooses spending time with her over Fuuko. Daiya took this as a chance to go out with Fuuko. Fuuko appears to have reconnected with her feelings for Daiya, but it is not known whether she is still in love with Ichi.
Ichi Shinpo
The cold and quiet love interest. Class President and ranks first on school tests, but rather shy and comes across as a haughty guy. Actually very caring once you get to know him. Works part-time in a restaurant. Not good at household chores. Really bad at drawing. Scared of dogs and haunted houses. He is very quiet but seems to be different when near or around Fuuko. Fuuko had been in love with Ichi, but she ended things with him because of his inability to let go of his feelings for Iori. Although he is still in love with Fuuko, she is now dating Daiya. However, he seems to be open to the idea of tearing the two apart.
Daiya Shinpo
A happy-go-lucky playboy. Not very academic, but wins everyone's heart with his open character. Used to date many girls at the same time, but stopped doing that after he had to reject Fuuko. Sometimes gives surprise performances as a singer in a two-man band, "The F brothers" with Issochi. He has been dating Fuuko after finally gaining her feelings, but he is insecure about the relationship because he knows that Ichi is still in love with Fuuko and that Fuuko once really loved Ichi.
Iori Kei
21 years old. Used to work at the Shinpo family firm, but got fired when Ichi fell in love with her. She has a boyfriend who is busy with work most of the time. She relies on Ichi to make her feel better. He mistakes this for love, but she regards him as a little brother.
Mako Oobayashi
Friend and classmate of Fuuko. Wears her fair hair up.
Chiso Komori
Friend and classmate of Fuuko. Has dark, wavy hair.
Akio Fuji
She pretends to be beautiful, elegant and refined but actually is a lot like Fuuko. She is a member of the tennis club. At first she was only using Fuuko in order to get close to Daiya. He rejected her, and a real friendship has started between her and Fuuko. Starts "dating" Isocchi.
Isobe Satoshi
Daiya's classmate. Also known as Isocchi. Daiya mistakenly thinks Fuuko is in love with him, and tries to set them up. After being rejected by Fuuko, he falls for Akio-senpai. Their relationship progresses slowly. Plays the guitar in "The F brothers".
Misora Kameyama
Fuuko's older sister. Works as a manga artist, and is usually dressed in comfy yet scruffy clothing. She is actually quite beautiful once she makes an effort. Still lives with her parents, and calls on Fuuko and the Shinpos for help (and inspiration) when she has trouble making her deadline.
Koto Shinpo
Ichi's little sister and self-proclaimed fiancé. Wants to be like him, and adapts the same cool and haughty attitude. Very mature for a firstgrader. She didn't want to go with her parents because of Ichi, so now she lives with her grandmother. Dislikes Fuuko for being in love with Ichi, but still thinks Fuuko's not as bad as Iori.

== List of media ==
=== Volumes ===
List of published manga volumes

- Volume 1 (25/09/2000) ISBN 4-08-847277-2
- Volume 2 (15/12/2000) ISBN 4-08-847316-7
- Volume 3 (25/04/2001) ISBN 4-08-847361-2
- Volume 4 (24/08/2001) ISBN 4-08-847405-8
- Volume 5 (25/01/2002) ISBN 4-08-847460-0
- Volume 6 (24/05/2002) ISBN 4-08-847503-8
- Volume 7 (25/09/2002) ISBN 4-08-847548-8
- Volume 8 (25/02/2003) ISBN 4-08-847599-2
- Volume 9 (25/06/2003) ISBN 4-08-847638-7
- Volume 10 (24/10/2003) ISBN 4-08-847673-5
- Volume 11 (25/03/2004) ISBN 4-08-847722-7
- Volume 12 (23/07/2004) ISBN 4-08-847759-6
- Volume 13 (25/11/2004) ISBN 4-08-847797-9
- Volume 14 (25/04/2005) ISBN 4-08-847842-8
- Volume 15 (25/07/2005) ISBN 4-08-847873-8
- Volume 16 (25/11/2005) ISBN 4-08-846003-0
- Volume 17 (24/03/2006) ISBN 4-08-846038-3
- Volume 18 (25/08/2006) ISBN 4-08-846083-9
- Volume 19 (25/12/2006) ISBN 4-08-846119-3
- Volume 20 (04/2007) ISBN 978-4-08-846160-1
- Volume 21 (06/2007) ISBN 978-4-08-846179-3
- Volume 22 (08/2007) ISBN 978-4-08-846201-1

=== Other ===
- Parfait Tic! Drama CD (01/10/2004) ISBN 4-08-905673-X

== Live-Action Drama ==
The live action drama (Taiwanese) of Parfait Tic! is called Love Buffet. Starring Reen Yu as Fuuko Kameyama, or Hu Xiao Feng, Aaron Yan as Ichi Shinpo, or Xing Yi Cheng, and Calvin Chen as Xing Da Ye, or Daiya Shinpo. This drama was broadcast from December 19, 2010, to March 13, 2011, on FTV.
