= Rinko Ueda =

Japanese manga artist (born 1970)

- Born: Ueda Tomoko; September 30, 1970 (age 56); Nara Prefecture, Japan
- Occupation: Manga artist
- Employer: Shueisha
- Known for: Tail of the Moon

Rinko Ueda (上田 倫子, Ueda Rinko; born September 30, 1970) is a Japanese manga artist who does mainly shojo manga. Her works are primarily serialized in Margaret magazine, with series published in collected volumes by Shueisha, though she has also been featured in fellow Shueisha publication Ribon, as well as illustrating the novel adaptation of her own Stepping on Roses series in Cobalt.

In 2014, Rinko Ueda would release two new titles, the series "Maria no Shiro" and a one-shot titled "Hoikumen!".

== Bibliography ==
- (1989) Kimi ni Botan no Namida (君にボタンの涙)
- (1989) Onaji Yume wo Kazoete (同じ夢をかぞえて)
- (1989) Prism ga Koibito (プリズムが恋人)
- (1990) Kiss wa Me ni Shite (キッスは瞳にして); adapted into an OVA by Madhouse in 1993
- (1993) Shin Gakuen Tengoku (新学園天国)
- (1996) Ryou (リョウ) (Note: Ryou was re-released by Shueisha as 8 volumes in 2005 after its original run of 15 volumes.)
- (2000) Houmu (ホーム; lit. Home)
- (2001) Panpu Appu! (パンプアップ！; lit. Pump Up!) (Note: The bound volume release of Pump Up! also includes Ueda's work Fuyu Hanabi (ふゆはなび; lit. Winter Fireworks).)
- (2002) Tsuki no Toiki no Ai no Kizu (月の吐息 愛の傷); (Note: The compiled volume of Tsuki no Toiki no Ai no Kizu features the title story and the related story Tsuki no Toiki Natsu no Yume (月の吐息 夏の夢).) English translation: Tail of the Moon Prequel: The Other Hanzo(u) (2009)
- (2002) Tsuki no Shippo (月のしっぽ); English translation: Tail of the Moon (2006)
- (2008) Hadashi de Bara wo Fume (裸足でバラを踏め; lit. Stepping on Roses Barefoot); English translation: Stepping on Roses (2010)
- (2009) Chō Tokkyū Hiyokko (超特急☆雏; lit. Super Express Hiyoko)
- (2011) Maragaret Best Selection: Not Friend, But... (マーガレットベストセレクション NOT FRIEND，BUT…, Māgaretto Besuto Serekushon Not Friend, But...) (Note: Rinko Ueda contributed a story to Not Friend, But..., a volume of one-shots by various Margaret authors.)
- (2012) Sakura Juuyuushi (樱的十勇士)
- (2013) Sakura Juuyuushi 2 (樱的十勇士2)
- (2014) Story 311 (ストーリー311 - 漫画で描き残す東日本大震災)
- (2014) Maria no Shiro (マリアの城)
- (2014) Hoikumen! (ホイクメン!)
- (-) Himitsu no juliet
