= Yokujō Climax =

Japanese manga series

- Desire Climax
- Cover art from volume 1 of the manga Desire Climax

欲情(C)MAX (Yokujō Climax)
- Manga
- Written by: Ayane Ukyō
- Published by: Shueisha
- Imprint: Margaret Comics
- Magazine: Margaret
- Original run: 2004 – 2006
- Volumes: 7

Desire Climax (欲情(C)MAX, Yokujō Climax) is a shōjo manga series by Ayane Ukyō. It was serialized in Shueisha's Margaret manga magazine from 2004 to 2006, and collected in seven bound volumes. The series is published in France by Panini Comics France and in Germany by Egmont Manga.

== Story ==
The Omori are a poor family. Mio Omori's father died when she was young, and her mother has been hospitalized for some time with an unspecified illness. She lives alone with her little brother Hinata, doing a number of part-time jobs to get by. One night, when going home after work, she encounters upon a violent young man who throws money at her, saying he'll 'buy her', after stealing her first kiss.

The next day her mother tells Mio that their landlord, who happens to be among her father's closest friends, has offered her a job as a maid at their mansion. Eager to help the family, he feels that it will be safer at night that way, and her mother agrees to this despite her daughter's opposition. To her horror, Mio finds out that the violent man who stole her kiss is none other than Shoei Jinnai, the son of their landlord and the most popular and high-achieving student at her high school; so much so that he is widely known as 'Prince Jinnai'.

In his own strange way, the Prince starts to treat her as his girlfriend, going so far as to tell Mio he loves her. When they finally start dating, Mio's brother Hinata becomes extremely jealous and tries to interfere with their relationship. When Mio catches them kissing, she runs home, but the next morning their house is demolished on the Prince's order.

== Characters ==
Mio Omori
Although poor, naive and often indecisive and emotionally weak, Mio has good intentions and is a very hardworking girl. Mio lives with her brother, Hinata, while their mother is in hospital. Due to an incident in her childhood, in which she was kidnapped in place of Shoei, she lost her memory of her friendship with him. In a meeting many years later, Shoei offers to buy her, claiming she now "belongs to him". She ends up working as a maid in the Jinnai's house and eventually lives in the house as a live in maid to Shoei. She starts to fall in love with Shoei but at one point believes she might be Shoei's half-sister. After learning this she consummates her relationship with Shoei and then runs away to live with Hinata and his pimp. It is later revealed that Hinata is actually Shoie's half-brother and not her. Through other trials Mio and Shoei rekindle their relationship. Mio eventually moves with her family into the mountains. Shoei transfers to her new school.
Shoei (Prince) Jinnai
Shoei is Mio's closest childhood friend and the scion of a very wealthy family, although Mio initially doesn't recall their past together. His father is the Omori family's landlord. He is popular, athletic, intelligent and handsome, adored by many girls in school, popular among both ladies and gentlemen. He is deeply in love with Mio. He blushes every time Mio takes off his glasses because when they were children she would take off his glasses then kiss him. He manipulates events so that Mio is first forced to work in his home as a maid, then to live there. Spoiled and extremely wealthy, he lacks in compassion, consideration and empathy towards others. Mio later takes it upon herself to re-educate him to be a better person. Later they become a couple.
Hinata (Hina) Omori
Mio's little brother, though not by blood. He is in fact the illegitimate son of Mr. Jinnai and is the Prince's half-brother. It is not clear how he found out or how long he has known about his origins, but it is known that he has been in love with his "sister" for some time. On many occasions, Hinata has demonstrated a cruel streak and manipulative personality: he wants Mio and is willing to use tricks and lies to separate her from the Prince. Unknown to Mio, he has been working as a male escort (prostitute). After running away from home, Hinata moved in with his pimp, before moving into the Jinnai house.
Mr. Tomoe
Hina's pimp. Hina moves in with him after running away. Later, Mio moves in with him too after he offers her a job and tells her that Hina is staying with him. Mio does not know Mr. Tomoe is Hina's pimp. He also seems to know a lot about Hina and Mio's family issues with the Jinnais, showing Hinata where to find his birth mother. He is later hired by Hayato to follow and lead Mio and Shoei to different locations. He is later betrayed by Hayato and arrested for prostitution.
Hayato
Prince's oniwaban (spy) is nineteen years old. Since his real job serves little purpose most of the time, he acts as the gardener for Jinnai house. He listens to Mio's problems, and seems to know more than he lets on. Its later revealed that Hayato is the son of the man that kidnapped Mio when she was younger. He has been working at the Jinnai's family home only to get revenge over the Jinnai family because his father committed suicide after kidnapping Mio and getting caught. He ends up kidnapping Mio to lure in Shoei but lets Shoei and Mio go.
Asako
Mio's mother. She is very sickly and stays in the hospital. Shoei has a close relationship with her, because she was his wet nurse (mother figure) when he was a child. There is some evidence of their closeness in that she calls him by his given name and he frequently visits her at the hospital. She often says or requests things from the Jinnai family without asking her children, and currently owes the Jinnai family a debt of over one-billion yen. Later in the manga she recovers from her illness and is able to move back home. She then plans to move to get Mio away from the Jinnai family because she wanted to protect Mio. She condones Mio and Shoei relationship later when she realizes how much Shoei loves Mio and won't let her go. She, Mio, and Hinata still move away to the mountains.
Mr. Jinnai
Shoei's father and Hinata's biological father. Mr. Jinnai is usually very carefree and extremely gentle, so much so that Mio says she can not refuse even his most unusual requests. However, he has been shown to become very serious and even frightening in times of stress. Afterwards, he reverts to his usual character. At some point in the past, he and Mio's father were very close friends, and Mr. Jinnai wishes to keep caring for Mio and her family because of it.
Jun-chan
A friend of Mio's from school. She doesn't know about Mio's relation with Prince.

== Volumes ==
No.	Release date	ISBN
1	25 January 2005	4-08-847819-3
2	25 May 2005	4-08-847855-X
3	22 September 2005	4-08-847888-6
4	25 January 2006	4-08-846021-9
5	23 June 2006	4-08-846066-9
6	25 September 2006	978-4-08-846090-1
7	25 October 2006	978-4-08-846102-1

== Reception ==
Reviewing the first volume, a reviewer for Manga News regarded the "strong point" of the manga to be its depiction of poverty in Japan. The reviewer found the brutality of the scenes between Mio and Jinnai to be confronting. AnimeLand regarded the first volume's story as 'sordid', disliking the non-consensual relationship that Mio is in, but noting that the author is popular with Japanese girls, "who do not seem affronted by the scenes of domination by horny males". Faustine Lillaz, writing for Planète BD, "gained the impression of a modernized Cinderella", but found the actions of the male characters to be "very caricatured". Lillaz found that the art was good, but that it "lacked originality". In a short review for volume four, the reviewer for AnimeLand described the manga as "morally violent", and found the fifth volume "repetitive". They found the "reversal of roles" in the final volume to give a "rather amusing" new dimension to the work. The reviewer for Manga News found the gardener a "dynamic" character.
