= Mairunovich =

Japanese manga series

- First tankōbon volume cover

マイルノビッチ (Mairunobitchi)
- Genre: Romance
- Manga
- Written by: Zakuri Satō
- Published by: Shueisha
- English publisher: Shueisha (digital)
- Imprint: Margaret Comics
- Magazine: Margaret
- Original run: December 20, 2010 – April 19, 2014
- Volumes: 12
- Television drama
- Directed by: Takashi Ninomiya
- Written by: Yukiko Mochiji
- Music by: Yoshiaki Dewa
- Studio: HJ Holdings
- Original network: Hulu Japan
- Original run: February 12, 2021 – April 2, 2021
- Episodes: 8

Mairunovich (マイルノビッチ, Mairunobitchi), also known as Mairu, The Bitch, is a Japanese manga series written and illustrated by Zakuri Satō. It was serialized in Shueisha's shōjo manga magazine Margaret from December 2010 to April 2014. A live-action television drama adaptation aired between February and April 2021.

== Media ==
=== Manga ===
Written and illustrated by Zakuri Satō, Mairunovich was serialized in Shueisha's shōjo manga magazine Margaret from December 20, 2010, to April 19, 2014. Its chapters were collected into twelve tankōbon volumes from April 25, 2011, to August 25, 2014. Shueisha began publishing the manga in English, under the title Mairu, The Bitch, on its Manga Million digital platform in 2026.

No.	Release date	ISBN
1	April 25, 2011	978-4-08-846641-5
2	July 25, 2011	978-4-08-846670-5
3	November 25, 2011	978-4-08-846716-0
4	March 23, 2012	978-4-08-846752-8
5	June 25, 2012	978-4-08-846784-9
6	September 25, 2012	978-4-08-846826-6
7	December 25, 2012	978-4-08-846866-2
8	April 25, 2013	978-4-08-845024-7
9	August 23, 2013	978-4-08-845079-7
10	December 25, 2013	978-4-08-845138-1
11	April 25, 2014	978-4-08-845191-6
12	August 25, 2014	978-4-08-846641-5

=== Drama ===
A live-action television drama adaptation was announced on February 20, 2020. The drama is a collaboration between Hulu Japan and the Margaret magazine as part of their Margaret Love Stories project. The drama starred Hinako Sakurai and Fūju Kamio in lead roles. It was initially set to premiere in Q4 2020, but was aired from February 12 to April 2, 2021.
