= Ayumi Komura =

Japanese manga artist

- 小村 あゆみ
- Born: January 15; Kagoshima, Japan
- Occupation: Manga artist
- Employer: Shueisha
- Known for: Mixed Vegetables

Ayumi Komura (小村 あゆみ, Komura Ayumi; born January 15) is a Japanese manga artist who writes mainly shōjo manga. Her works are primarily serialized in Margaret magazine, with series published in collected volumes by Shueisha under their Margaret Comics imprint. She contributed to a charity book, along with other authors primarily published in Margaret, to raise funds for the 2011 Japanese earthquake. Her manga series Kami-sama no Ekohiiki will be adapted into a live-action drama series.

== Bibliography ==
- 2004: Hybrid Berry (ハイブリッドベリー, Haiburiddo Berī)
- 2005–2007: Mixed Vegetables (ミックスベジタブル, Mikkusu Bejitaburu)
- 2008: Joō-sama no Tamago (女王様のタマゴ)
- 2009: Hot Milk (ホットミルク, Hotto Miruku) (Note: The stories in Hot Milk were serialized in various issues of Margaret. They were collected and published together by Shueisha in a single tankōbon volume in December 2009.)
- 2009–2014: Usotsuki Lily (うそつきリリィ, Usotsuki Riri; lit. Liar Lily)
- 2010: Maragaret Best Selection: I Love You (マーガレットベストセレクション I LOVE YOU, Māgaretto Besuto Serekushon I Love You) (Note: Ayumi Komura contributed a story to I Love You, a volume of one-shots by various Margaret authors.)
- 2010: Margaret Best Selection: He Loves You (マーガレットベストセレクション HE LOVES YOU, Māgaretto Besuto Serekushon He Loves You) (Note: Ayumi Komura contributed a story to He Loves You, a volume of one-shots by various Margaret authors.)
- 2013–2014: Kenjutsu Komachi (剣術小町)
- 2014–2015: Full Dozer
- 2015: Simple Hot Chocolate (シンプルホットチョコレート, Shinpuru Hotto Chokorēto)
- 2015–2016: Mori no Takuma-san (森のたくまさん)
- 2017–2018: Kami-sama no Ekohiiki (神様のえこひいき)
- 2018–2019: Kare Cafe (カレカフェ)
- 2019: Mobakare (モバカレ)
- 2019–2020: Okuchi no Sensei wa Shojo Danshi (おくちの医師は処女男子)
- 2020: Akumade Futari wa Business desu (あくまでふたりはビジネスです)
