= Shortcake Cake =

Japanese manga series by Suu Morishita

- First tankōbon volume cover

ショートケーキケーキ (Shōtokēki Kēki)
- Genre: Coming-of-age; Romantic drama
- Manga
- Written by: Suu Morishita
- Published by: Shueisha
- English publisher: NA: Viz Media
- Imprint: Margaret Comics
- Magazine: Margaret
- Original run: November 5, 2015 – March 5, 2019
- Volumes: 12

Shortcake Cake (ショートケーキケーキ, Shōtokēki Kēki) is a Japanese manga series written and illustrated by Suu Morishita. It was serialized in Shueisha's shōjo manga magazine Margaret from November 2015 to March 2019.

== Plot ==
When Ten Serizawa starts high school, she has to take the bus for two hours every day. At first, this doesn't bother her much, but when she becomes friends with her classmate Ageha Haruno, Ten doesn't have much time to do anything. So one night, she secretly stays overnight at Ageha's dorm, where three boys of the same age live. Ten likes it so much that she moves into the dorm and no longer has a long commute. A room had become available after another girl moved out. This girl had fallen in love and moved out because the dorm rules against having someone of the opposite sex in the room.

After moving in, Ten gets to know her roommates better. Chiaki Kasadera is helpful and impresses her with his education and good looks. Riku Mizuhara, on the other hand, is also handsome and admired by many girls, but annoys Ten with his brusque manner in rejecting female admirers. She tells him this clearly, making an impression on Riku. He can't get Ten out of his head either. And since both girls long to fall in love someday, the dorm rules become a problem for them as well.

== Publication ==
Written and illustrated by Suu Morishita, Shortcake Cake was serialized in Shueisha's shōjo manga magazine Margaret from November 5, 2015, to March 5, 2019. Its chapters were collected into twelve tankōbon volumes released from January 25, 2016, to July 25, 2019. The series is licensed in English by Viz Media.

No.	Original release date	Original ISBN	North American release date	North American ISBN
1	January 25, 2016	978-4-08-845513-6	August 7, 2018	978-1-9747-0061-5
2	May 25, 2016	978-4-08-845574-7	November 6, 2018	978-1-9747-0062-2
3	August 25, 2016	978-4-08-845621-8	February 5, 2019	978-1-9747-0063-9
4	November 25, 2016	978-4-08-845667-6	May 7, 2019	978-1-9747-0064-6
5	March 24, 2017	978-4-08-845731-4	August 6, 2019	978-1-9747-0065-3
6	July 25, 2017	978-4-08-845786-4	November 5, 2019	978-1-9747-0066-0
7	November 24, 2017	978-4-08-845851-9	February 4, 2020	978-1-9747-0824-6
8	February 23, 2018	978-4-08-845889-2	May 5, 2020	978-1-9747-0825-3
9	June 25, 2018	978-4-08-844050-7	August 4, 2020	978-1-9747-0826-0
10	October 25, 2018	978-4-08-844105-4	November 3, 2020	978-1-9747-1550-3
11	February 25, 2019	978-4-08-844166-5	February 2, 2021	978-1-9747-1551-0
12	July 25, 2019	978-4-08-844222-8	May 4, 2021	978-1-9747-1721-7

== Reception ==
The series had over 1.1 million copies in circulation by October 2018.

== See also ==
- A Sign of Affection, another manga series by Suu Morishita
- Like a Butterfly, another manga series by Suu Morishita
