= Kuroneko Kareshi =

Japanese manga series

- Cover of the Japanese version of Kuroneko Kareshi no Asobikata, first released on September 29, 2012

クロネコ彼氏 (Kuroneko Kareshi)
- Genre: Boys' love
- Manga
- Written by: Aya Sakyō
- Published by: Shinshokan
- Imprint: Dear+ Comics
- Magazine: Dear+
- Original run: 2012 – present
- Volumes: 9

The Kuroneko Kareshi (Japanese: クロネコ彼氏; "Black Cat Boyfriend") series is a Japanese manga series by Ayane Ukyō under the pseudonym Aya Sakyō. The Kuroneko Kareshi series was serialized in the bimonthly boys' love manga magazine Dear+ since 2012.

== Plot ==
0.001% of the human population are werecats, where they are able to shapeshift into cats. One of them, Shingo, is able to shapeshift into a black cat, which he keeps as a secret. During work one day, Shingo meets Keiichi Kagami, one of the most famous actors in Japan, who quickly takes an interest in him. As Kagami seduces Shingo, he not only reveals he is aware Shingo is a werecat, but he also admits that he is able to shapeshift into a leopard. Shingo initially rejects Kagami, but he gradually starts finding himself attracted to him.

== Characters ==
Shingo (真悟)
Voiced by: Takashi Kondō
Shingo is a 24-year-old contractor builder who is able to shapeshift into a black cat. He leads a sexually active life and is particularly mischievous, but he fears being left alone ever since he was abandoned as a child.
Keiichi Kagami (賀神圭市, Kagami Keiichi)
Voiced by: Tomoaki Maeno
Keiichi is a 28-year-old actor who is able to shapeshift into a leopard.
Eugine Kagami (賀神ユージン, Kagami Yūjin)
Voiced by: Daisuke Hirakawa
Eugine is Keiichi's older brother. Because his leopard genes are mainly recessive, he is unable to completely shapeshift into a leopard.
Takamizawa (高見沢)
Voiced by: Yoshihisa Kawahara
Takamizawa is Keiichi's childhood friend and personal butler. He has housecat genes, but since they are not dominant, he is not able to shapeshift at all.

== Media ==
=== Manga ===
The Kuroneko Kareshi series is written and illustrated by Ayane Ukyō under the pseudonym Aya Sakyō. It is serialized in the bimonthly magazine Dear+ beginning in 2012. The chapters were later released in 9 bound volumes by Shinshokan under the Dear+ Comics imprint. The series is a spin-off of Ukyō's previous series, Nekoka Danshi no Shitsukekata and Nekoka Kareshi no Ayashikata.

Kuroneko Kareshi no Aishikata began in the October 2014 issue. Kuroneko Kareshi no Afurekata began in 2015 and ended in the June 2016 issue.

A drama CD adaptation of Kuroneko Kareshi no Nakasekata was released on October 31, 2014.

No.	Title	Japanese release date	Japanese ISBN
1	Kuroneko Kareshi no Asobikata (クロネコ彼氏のアソビ方)	September 29, 2012	978-4-403-66361-1
2	Kuroneko Kareshi no Amaekata (クロネコ彼氏の甘え方)	September 30, 2013	978-4-403-66402-1
3	Kuroneko Kareshi no Aishikata 1 (クロネコ彼氏の愛し方 (1))	August 10, 2014	978-4-403-66436-6
4	Kuroneko Kareshi no Aishikata 2 (クロネコ彼氏の愛し方 (2))	November 5, 2012	978-4-403-66441-0
5	Kuroneko Kareshi no Afurekata 1 (クロネコ彼氏のあふれ方 (1))	November 30, 2015	978-4-403-66495-3
6	Kuroneko Kareshi no Afurekata 2 (クロネコ彼氏のあふれ方 (2))	March 30, 2016	978-4-403-66511-0
7	Kuroneko Kareshi no Afurekata 3 (クロネコ彼氏のあふれ方 (3))	November 1, 2016	978-4-403-66536-3
8	Kuroneko Kareshi no Arukikata (クロネコ彼氏のあるき方)	July 2, 2018	978-4-403-66639-1
9	Kuroneko Kareshi no Arukikata 2 (クロネコ彼氏のあるき方 (2))	December 1, 2018	978-4-403-66660-5

==== Spin-off ====
No.	Title	Japanese release date	Japanese ISBN
1	Fukigen Kareshi no Nadamekata (不機嫌彼氏のなだめ方)	May 30, 2015	978-4-403-66471-7
2	Fukigen Kareshi no Saraikata (不機嫌彼氏のさらい方)	June 1, 2017	978-4-403-66574-5

== Reception ==
In 2014, Kuroneko Kareshi no Amaekata was ranked #8 in Chil Chil's Boys' Love Awards in the Top 20 Manga category. Kuroneko Kareshi no Aishikata was ranked #3 on the list of recommended boys' love stories in a survey of 470 employees across 400 bookstores nationwide in Japan. In 2019, the entire Kuroneko Kareshi series was ranked #3 in the top 100 boys' love manga on BookLive!, a digital book distributor.
