= Stepping on Roses =

Japanese manga series by Rinko Ueda

- Cover of the first manga volume, featuring Sumi and Soichiro.

裸足でバラを踏め (Hadashi de Bara o Fume)
- Genre: Romance
- Manga
- Written by: Rinko Ueda
- Published by: Shueisha
- English publisher: NA: Viz Media; AU: Madman Entertainment
- Magazine: Margaret
- Original run: 2007 – March 19, 2012
- Volumes: 9

Stepping on Roses (Japanese: 裸足でバラを踏め, Hepburn: Hadashi de Bara o Fume; lit. "Stepping on Roses Barefoot") is a Japanese shōjo manga series written and illustrated by Rinko Ueda. The series began serialization in Margaret magazine in 2007 and completed its run in the March 19, 2012 issue of the same magazine. The individual chapters have been collected into eight tankōbon volumes by Shueisha as of March 2012; the first on April 25, 2008, and the most recent on October 25, 2011. The series has been licensed by Viz Media for an English-language North American release as part of their Shojo Beat imprint.

== Plot ==
During the year Meiji 25 (1892,) Sumi Kitamura is penniless and her brother Eisuke, a womanizer and gambler, constantly leaves them in debt while bringing even more orphaned children home to feed. When her adopted sister, Tomi, becomes ill, Sumi finds that no doctors will help her as they are poor and no one is willing to give her money for medicine to save Tomi. Then as Sumi is crying on the road a handsome man gives her a handkerchief and some money, telling her to stop crying as smiles beckon happiness into her life before disappearing. Later a debt collector turns up at Sumi's house demanding 2000 yen. Eisuke is nowhere to be found and it is revealed that he had been making advances on the debt collector's wife. The man says that he will take away all of Sumi's younger siblings and sell them into slavery. Desperate to save her siblings, Sumi goes to the red light district in an attempt to raise the money in one night. Just when she thinks there's no more hope, a man named Soichiro Ashida appears and says that he will buy her. Sumi goes with him only to find that he was paying her to marry him! They immediately go to the church and afterwards he says that he'll pay for anything she could possibly want, but she has to marry him and not fall for him and that he will never love her. Sumi agrees and they get married.

== Characters ==
Sumi Ashida (née Kitamura) (北村 純, Kitamura Sumi)
The series' protagonist. At the start of the series, 15-year-old Sumi is living in the lowest levels of poverty until she marries Soichiro. She is an incredibly kind girl, but has a psychological issues with the scent of roses, caused by childhood trauma. Sumi is generally headstrong but rather dense. She is a master of shogi and a good cook as well. She becomes caught between her love for her husband, Soichiro, and Nozomu. It is later revealed that Nozomu is her biological brother, and that her real name is Aiko (愛子, Aiko). At the end of the story, Sumi establishes an elementary school that anyone can attend and has a baby girl with Soichiro.
Soichiro Ashida (芦田 蒼一郎, Ashida Sōichirō)
Sumi's husband; He marries Sumi to get his inheritance. He is a childhood friend of Nozomu. He can be considered an example of a tsundere character. Soichiro is afraid of fires due to a traumatic event in his childhood, where his parents and younger half-brother died in a fire that destroyed his home. Some believe that it was Soichiro who caused this tragedy, when it was likely his half-brother's doing, as he had been playing with matches earlier that day. Soichiro is quick to assume and can be selfish, but seems to be learning to genuinely care for Sumi. He falls in love with her, even giving up all his money and his company to be with her. Sumi has changed him for a better person. At the end of the story, Soichiro and Sumi have a baby girl.
Nozomu Ijuin (伊集院 望, Ijūin Nozomu)
Soichiro's childhood friend. He is very skilled at painting. He falls in love with Sumi, the moment he sees her. But it evolves into an obsession when it's brought to his attention that he can't have her. He even goes as far as kidnapping her. Despite later being married to Miu, a woman of his father's choosing, he asks Sumi to run away with him. He becomes a yandere character as the story progresses. Nozomu is conniving enough to attain the presidencies of both his father's and Soichiro's companies. Later on, he even forces an eviction on Sumi's adopted family, and makes them homeless, in order to make Sumi come to him for help and love him. However, deep down inside, Sumi still has feelings and love for Soichiro, no matter how hard that Nozomu forces on her. Despite finding out that Sumi is his biological sister, he still wanted to marry her. When Soichiro came and stopped the wedding by taking Sumi away, since she loves him the most, Nozomu makes up with Miu and starts loving her. In the end of the story, Nozomu and Miu are off far away from where Sumi is, so Nozomu can try to forget his love for her, as she is his sister, and he and Miu are expecting a baby soon.
Gengoro Komai (駒井 源五郎, Komai Gengorō)
Soichiro's butler. Komai leaves Soichiro after Soichiro does not believe him during an incident with Keiko. Afraid to face his parents after quitting, Komai lives with Sumi's family, taking care of the young children. Nozomu later hires Komai to be his butler, though Komai appears to still be loyal to Soichiro. In the end of the story, Komai is Soichiro and Sumi's butler again.
Eisuke Kitamura (北村 英輔, Kitamura Eisuke)
Sumi's older brother, who has a terrible problem with gambling. Eisuke gets a job at Soichiro's company and manages to pay 10 years worth of the bills towards his landlord. Shown to be extremely handsome, he has a job in which he visits older, richer women. It is revealed that Sumi and Eisuke are not biologically related; he found her in a rose garden as a baby and brought her up as his sister. The reason Eisuke brings home so many abandoned children to Sumi because she once wished for more siblings. In the end of the story, Eisuke is seen holding Soichiro and Sumi's baby daughter in one of his arms.
Miu Ijuin (née Fujiwara) (伊集院 美卯, Ijūin Miu)
Nozomu's wife from an arranged marriage by their parents. She is devoted to Nozomu but he is unfeeling towards her. She is good friends with Sumi at first. Because she had not know of Sumi and Nozomu's previous relationship, she didn't know about Nozomu's psychotic tendencies either. She tries to get Nozomu to notice her, going so far as to use Sumi's perfume. This causes Nozomu to react physically with Miu for the first time in their arranged marriage. Unfortunately, he whispers Sumi's name, not Miu's. Miu starts to wonder what relationship the two had before her marriage to Nozomu. At a party, Nozomu continues to fawn and look at Sumi lovingly. He praises her saying she was more beautiful than anyone else. Before dancing with her, Nozomu refers to Sumi by her name, which causes Miu to flash back to Nozomu whispering Sumi's name. Miu grabs a bouquet of roses and attacks Sumi, cutting her cheek with the thorns, and cries hysterically. After the attack on Sumi, Miu confronts Nozomu and asks if he is in love with that aforementioned girl, to which Nozomu admits that he is and that he does not feel the same way about her. Miu then finds Nozomu's painting of Sumi, and slashes it with a knife. Later, Miu arrives suddenly at the shogi club and informs everyone that she will be holding a party at her and Nozomu's. During this party, Nozomu unexpectedly announces to all the guests that he and Miu will be divorcing, without consulting with Miu beforehand. Devastated, she yells at Sumi and blames her for all that has happened. She attempts to stab Sumi in rage, but is stopped by Soichiro and Nozomu, and once again cries uncontrollably. She enters a coma-like state and is sent to a summer house for patients with mental health problems. Sumi visits her, begging to know what she must do to atone for her friend's misfortune, and she tells Sumi to jump off a cliff into the ocean. Sumi then does so, because she greatly cares for Miu. It is then implied that her and Sumi's friendship is restored, with Miu understanding that it was always Nozomu who'd been chasing Sumi. In the end of the story, Miu and Nozomu make up, go off far away place in the country, and are expecting a baby soon.
Natsuki Kujo (九条 夏樹, Kujō Natsuki)
Soichiro’s step-cousin and vice-president of Soichiro's company. He becomes suspicious of Sumi and attempts to find out her true origins. He and Nozomu later team up to have Soichiro removed as company president. It is implied that he had held real feelings for Keiko, but made her doubt him when he tells her he was to be married soon. He was tricked by Nozomu who takes the head position from him. He later return to Sumi's side to aide her for redemption. In the end of the story, he was one of the fellows from Soichiro's company that congratulated Sumi for establishing an elementary school, thus making him nice.
Keiko Kinoshita (木下 桂子, Kinoshita Keiko)
Soichiro and Sumi’s maid. She appears to be loyal and friendly, but is actually working as a spy for Natsuki. It is implied that she and Natsuki had a physical relationship, one she hoped to hold onto even after she went to spy on Soichiro. In the later chapters, she returns to Natsuki's house. There, Natsuki proposes to Keiko but she refuses, saying she was discarded. It was hinted that he did have feelings for her. But after Keiko realizes that all Natsuki wanted was power, she cuts off all ties with him. After her confrontation with Natsuki, she is kinder to Sumi, and stops making advances towards Soichiro.

== Media ==
=== Manga ===
Written and drawn by Rinko Ueda, the Stepping on Roses manga began serialization in the shōjo manga magazine Margaret in 2007. (Note: The series went on hiatus at one point due to the birth of the author's son, after this, the series was only in every other issue of the magazine, making it a monthly series, instead of a bi-monthly series.) It was announced that Stepping on Roses would conclude in the February 20, 2012 issue of Margaret, but the chapter was pushed back one issue to the March 19 issue. At their panel at Anime Expo 2009, Viz Media announced they had licensed the series for North America as part of their Shojo Beat imprint.

==== Volume list ====
No.	Original release date	Original ISBN	North America release date	North America ISBN
01	April 25, 2008	978-4-08-846283-7	April 6, 2010	1-4215-3182-8
02	August 25, 2008	978-4-08-846322-3	July 6, 2010	1-4215-3183-6
03	November 25, 2008	978-4-08-846351-3	October 2010	1-4215-3237-9
04	April 24, 2009	978-4-08-846398-8	January 2011	1-4215-3593-9
05	March 25, 2010	978-4-08-846504-3	April 2011	1-4215-3942-X
06	September 24, 2010	978-4-08-846567-8	July 5, 2011	1-4215-3976-4
07	May 24, 2011	978-4-08-846644-6	March 6, 2012	978-1-4215-4175-4
08	October 25, 2011	978-4-08-846707-8	October 2, 2012	978-1-4215-4313-0
09	April 24, 2012	978-4-08-846765-8	February 5, 2013	1-4215-5080-6

=== Light Novel ===
The series is also being adapted as a light novel, that runs in Cobalt.

== Reception ==
Deb Aoki of About.com says of the first volume that while it glosses over its Meiji Era setting's "not-so-pretty aspects", the approach works for what Ueda is doing. Overall, Aoki seems to like the series, calling it a "charming and unapologetically romantic story that will make you smile." Mania.com's Julie Opipari mentions that while the series is like a Harlequin novel, which could be off-putting for some readers, it drew her into the story. She also mentions that occasionally the melodrama is a bit much, but that she "can't wait to find out" what will happen next.

Volume two of the Viz edition of the manga was number 10 on the New York Times manga best-seller list in its first week of release. The third and fourth volumes were ranked number 8 on the same list in their first week of release. The fifth volume of the Viz's English release of the series ranked 6th in its first week of publication.
