= Daytime Shooting Star =

Japanese manga series

- Cover of volume 12

ひるなかの流星 (Hirunaka no Ryūsei)
- Genre: Romance
- Manga
- Written by: Mika Yamamori
- Published by: Shueisha
- English publisher: NA: Viz Media
- Imprint: Margaret Comics
- Magazine: Margaret
- Original run: May 20, 2011 – November 5, 2014
- Volumes: 13
- Live-action film

Daytime Shooting Star (ひるなかの流星, Hirunaka no Ryūsei) is a Japanese shōjo manga written and illustrated by Mika Yamamori. It ran in Margaret from 2011 to 2014. A live-action film adaptation of the same name was released in 2017, as well as a collaboration clothing line with Earth Music & Ecology in 2014.

== Plot ==
Suzume Yosano's parents move to Bangladesh when her father's position gets relocated, while Suzume herself moves to Tokyo to live with her uncle, Yukichi. On the way to her uncle's house, Suzume gets lost and is helped by a stranger. She later learns on her first day of school that the stranger is her homeroom teacher, Satsuki Shishio.

== Characters ==
Suzume Yosano (与謝野 すずめ, Yosano Suzume)
Played by: Mei Nagano
Suzume is the main protagonist who moved from the countryside to Tokyo to live with her uncle when she goes to high school. She is in love with Mamura and confesses to him, which he accepts, after which they begin to date.
Satsuki Shishio (獅子尾 五月, Shishio Satsuki)
Played by: Shohei Miura
Satsuki is Suzume's homeroom teacher who has a crush on Suzume. After she confesses to him for a second time, he agrees to secretly date her. However, by the time they are getting back together, Suzume is already dating Mamura.
Daiki Mamura (馬村 大輝, Mamura Daiki)
Played by: Alan Shirahama
Mamura is Suzume's classmate who sits in front of her. Being a gynophobe, Suzume uses it to blackmail him into being her friend. His appearance was based on model Kentaro Sakaguchi.
Yuyuka Nekota (猫田 ゆゆか, Nekota Yuyuka)
Played by: Maika Yamamoto
Yuyuka is a blunt girl with a hard time of getting along with other classmates. She hides behind a cute exterior that is friendly and outgoing in order to make friends. Initially, Yuyuka was only pretending to be nice to get closer to Mamura, but the two later become honest friends. She eventually confesses to him, who rejects her, saying that he has feelings for Suzume.
Nana Kameyoshi (亀由 奈々, Kameyoshi Nana)
Played by: Shieri Ohata
Nana is one of Suzume's classmates.
Monika Tsurutani (鶴谷 モニカ, Tsurutani Monika)
Played by: Rina Koyama
Monika is Suzume's half-Japanese classmate who later begins dating Manabu Inukai.
Manabu Inukai (犬飼 学, Inukai Manabu)
Manabu is Suzume's classmate who serves as class president. He later begins dating Monika Tsurutani.
Togyuu Minagawa (皆川 土牛, Minagawa Togyuu)
Togyuu is Suzume's upperclassmen who can be a bit of a playboy and is interested in Yuyuka.
Yukichi Kumamoto (熊本 諭吉, Kumamoto Yukichi)
Played by: Ryuta Sato
Yukichi is Suzume's unmarried uncle who runs a café and is friends with Shishio.

== Media ==
=== Manga ===
Daytime Shooting Star is written and illustrated by Mika Yamamori. The series first was announced on May 3, 2011. The manga was serialized in the bi-weekly magazine Margaret from May 20, 2011, to November 2014. The chapters were later released in bound volumes by Shueisha under the Margaret Comics imprint.

In honor of the 50th anniversary of Margaret, Yamamori collaborated with Momoko Koda, the author of No Longer Heroine, to release the crossover comic Heroine Shooting Star. Heroine Shooting Star was released in Mini Margaret, a booklet that was distributed as a magazine gift in the May 20, 2013 issue of Margaret. In 2014, Yamamori collaborated with Suu Morishita, the author of Like a Butterfly, to produce two crossover comics, Hibi Shooting Star and Daytime Chōchō.

Wanting to promote the live-action movie, Yamamori released Daytime Shooting Star: Side Story Blue in the February 3, 2017 issue of Margaret. It was followed up by Daytime Shooting Star: Side Story Red in the March 28, 2017 issue of Margaret.

In 2018, Viz Media announced at the New York Comic Con that they were licensing the series for English distribution, with all comics being published under the Shojo Beat imprint.

No.	Original release date	Original ISBN	English release date	English ISBN
1	October 25, 2011	978-4-08-846708-5	July 2, 2019	978-1-9747-0667-9
2	February 24, 2012	978-4-08-846744-3	September 3, 2019	978-1-9747-0668-6
3	June 25, 2012	978-4-08-846786-3	November 5, 2019	978-1-9747-0669-3
4	October 25, 2012	978-4-08-846843-3	January 7, 2020	978-1-9747-0670-9
5	February 25, 2013	978-4-08-846888-4	March 3, 2020	978-1-9747-0671-6
6	May 24, 2013	978-4-08-845042-1	May 5, 2020	978-1-9747-0672-3
7	September 25, 2013	978-4-08-845095-7	July 7, 2020	978-1-9747-1507-7
8	December 25, 2013	978-4-08-845139-8	September 1, 2020	978-1-9747-1508-4
9	March 25, 2014	978-4-08-845177-0	November 3, 2020	978-1-9747-1509-1
10	June 25, 2014	978-4-08-845224-1	January 5, 2021	978-1-9747-1510-7
11	October 24, 2014	978-4-08-845281-4	March 2, 2021	978-1-9747-1511-4
12	February 24, 2015	978-4-08-845344-6	May 4, 2021	978-1-9747-1512-1
Side Stories	August 25, 2015	978-4-08-845430-6	–	—

=== Live-action film ===
In mid-September 2016, the live-action film adaptation was announced. The film stars Mei Nagano as Suzume, Shohei Miura as Shishio, and Alan Shirahama as Mamura. The film was released in Japan on March 24, 2017, in 272 theaters and opened at #5 on opening weekend. The film's theme song is "Hayaku Aitai" by Dream Ami.

Yamamori released Daytime Shooting Star: Side Story Blue in the February 3, 2017 issue of Margaret and Daytime Shooting Star: Side Story Red in the March 28, 2017 issue of Margaret to promote the film. Nagano and Shirahama were also featured in a collaboration commercial as their characters to cross-promote handbags from Samantha Vega, a sister brand of Samantha Thavasa.

== Reception ==
The series has 1.93 million copies in print and 500,000 in paid digital copies.
