= Like a Butterfly =

Japanese manga series

- Cover of the first volume of manga featuring Suiren Shibazeki.

日々蝶々 (Hibi Chōchō)
- Genre: Romance, slice of life
- Manga
- Written by: Suu Morishita
- Published by: Shueisha
- English publisher: NA: Viz Media
- Imprint: Margaret Comics
- Magazine: Margaret
- Original run: February 20, 2012 – June 5, 2015
- Volumes: 12
- Audio drama

Like a Butterfly (日々蝶々, Hibi Chōchō; "Daily Butterfly") is a Japanese slice of life romance shōjo manga series written and illustrated by Suu Morishita and published by Shueisha in Margaret magazine. Volume 1 was released on July 25, 2012, and a total of 12 volumes have been published. At New York Comic Con 2022, Viz Media announced that they licensed the series for English publication. The series is published in French by Panini, which released the first volume on February 4, 2015. It was adapted into a drama CD.

== Characters ==
=== Main characters ===
Suiren Shibazeki (柴石すいれん, Shibazeki Suiren)
Voiced by: Kana Hanazawa
At the beginning of the series she is 15-years-old. She is known in school as a "flower on a high peak" (高嶺の花, takane no hana), a phrase meaning "an unattainable object". A very beautiful but quiet girl, she never speaks to anyone, because of her extreme shyness.
In elementary school, the boys who liked her bullied her, so she went to an all-girls' middle school. There, the girls defended her against boys from other schools, but the girls loved her obsessively. Since then, she rarely speaks and shows little emotion.
Finally she decided to go to a co-ed high school. Suiren became interested in Taichi Kawasumi because he was the only boy who did not fall in love with her on the first day of school. He is the first person to hear her speak and smile. She shows more emotions as the series progresses.
She did not know of her own feelings of love until Aya pointed it out in chapter 3 and is confirmed in chapter 6. Taichi Kawasumi officially confessed to Suiren in chapter 34 and they became a couple. They finally kissed in chapter 72.
Suiren learns how to become mentally stronger in dealing with her popularity from Atohira (chapter 61).
Taichi Kawasumi (川澄泰一, Kawasumi Taichi)
Voiced by: Ryōta Ōsaka
At the beginning of the series he is 15-years-old. By chapter 71 he is 18-years-old. He's a quiet boy with glasses, who is also the school's karate champion. He is generally taciturn with everybody, and especially reserved around girls.
During the high school entrance ceremony, Suiren tries to meet his eyes because he was the only boy who didn't fall instantly in love with her on the first day of school. Since then, she takes an interest in him and falls in love with him. He falls for Suiren since chapter 1 but didn't know about his own feelings until Ryōsuke asked him in chapter 18. He officially confessed to Suiren in chapter 34 and they became a couple. They finally kissed in chapter 72.
Surprisingly, he is really bad in art (chapter 49.5).

=== Supporting characters ===
Aya Shimizu (清水あや, Shimizu Aya)
Voiced by: Miyuki Sawashiro
Aya is Suiren's friend, a sleepy-eyed but pushy girl. She figures out about Suiren's love for Taichi Kawasumi in chapter 3. She and Yuri help Suiren get closer to Taichi. She always protected Suiren against boys throughout their childhood to high school. She was never interested in boys. She hate Ryōsuke smiling at his girlfriend Mina but is always seen doing sideways glances towards him. But her hate is actually a one-sided like for him (chapter 71) though she knows it will not be returned. In chapter 75.8, she has a potential boyfriend.
Yuri Kudō (工藤ゆり, Kudō Yuri)
Voiced by: Risa Taneda
Yuri is Suiren's friend. She has also known Ryōsuke since middle school. She was known as "Sayuki" in middle school. She and Aya help Suiren get closer to Taichi. She, herself, finally finds her own boyfriend Daisuke in chapter 60. Even during the university years, she is still with him (chapter 75.6).
Ryōsuke Takaya (高屋良祐, Takaya Ryōsuke)
Voiced by: Hiro Shimono
Ryōsuke is Taichi 's friend, a less-accomplished karate club member who has known Taichi since they were small children. He liked Suiren since the first day of school but lets Taichi have her when he finds out about their mutual feelings for each other.
Koharu Shinkawa (新川小春, Shinkawa Koharu)
Voiced by: Ami Koshimizu
Koharu is a beautiful, extroverted girl who has her heart set on dating Taichi since chapter 2. When he rejects her initial confession, she does not give up, but continues to fight for his affections. Even though she finds out about Taichi's feelings for Suiren, she still tries to confess to him. He finally rejects her in chapter 20. Though she had past feelings for Taichi, she starts falling for Atohira. She finally confessed and now they are dating (chapter 75.7).
The funny thing is that the first word Suiren saids to her is "annoying".
Atohira
A laidback guy who was Taichi's upperclassman and fellow karate club member during middle school. He is Ichi's friend. He quit karate following middle school. He is extremely popular with the girls though he always ignores them. He is so popular that once, during the middle school graduation, his uniform buttons and school bag disappeared.
He is extremely blunt towards others, even if it hurts their feelings. He and Yuri's boyfriend Daisuke go to the same high school. He wasn't interested in any girls until Suiren talked to him (chapter 62). He lets go his feeling for her (chapter 69) since Taichi is the person to make her talk and show feelings.
Ichi Kawasumi
He is Taichi's older brother and fellow karate club member during middle school. He is similar to Suiren, in that both do not talk much.
Meguna Sotomura
She is a fellow classmate who becomes friends with Suiren during the second year of high school (chapter 48). She already has a boyfriend before meeting Suiren. Her attitude became similar to that of Aya – bluntly stating to the boys to leave Suiren alone.
Mina Ozaki
Ryōsuke's girlfriend, as stated in chapter 49. She knows that Aya has a one-sided crush to her boyfriend (chapter 71).

== Volumes ==
| No. | Original release date | Original ISBN | English release date | English ISBN |
|---|---|---|---|---|
| 1 | July 25, 2012 | 978-4-08-846715-3 | July 4, 2023 | 978-1-9747-3879-3 |
| 2 | November 22, 2012 | 978-4-08-846854-9 | September 5, 2023 | 978-1-9747-4045-1 |
| 3 | March 25, 2013 | 978-4-08-845008-7 | November 7, 2023 | 978-1-9747-4123-6 |
| 4 | June 25, 2013 | 978-4-08-845055-1 | January 2, 2024 | 978-1-9747-4291-2 |
| 5 | September 25, 2013 | 978-4-08-845096-4 | March 5, 2024 | 978-1-9747-4292-9 |
| 6 | December 25, 2013 | 978-4-08-845140-4 | May 7, 2024 | 978-1-9747-4562-3 |
| 7 | April 25, 2014 | 978-4-08-845192-3 | July 2, 2024 | 978-1-9747-4611-8 |
| 8 | July 25, 2014 | 978-4-08-845236-4 | September 3, 2024 | 978-1-9747-4882-2 |
| 9 | November 25, 2014 | 978-4-08-845297-5 | November 5, 2024 | 978-1-9747-4931-7 |
| 10 | March 25, 2015 | 978-4-08-845358-3 | January 7, 2025 | 978-1-9747-5157-0 |
| 11 | July 24, 2015 | 978-4-08-845410-8 | March 4, 2025 | 978-1-9747-5221-8 |
| 12 | October 25, 2015 | 978-4-08-845459-7 | May 6, 2025 | 978-1-9747-5499-1 |

== Reception ==
It was number four on the 2014 Kono Manga ga Sugoi! Top 20 Manga for Female Readers survey and it was number nine in the Nationwide Bookstore Employees' Recommended Comics of 2014. It was also nominated for Best Shōjo Manga at the 38th Kodansha Manga Award.

Volume 4 has sold 42,419 copies, as of 29 June 2013; volume 5 has sold 83,454 copies, as of 6 October 2013; volume 6 has sold 112,902 copies, as of 5 January 2014. volume 7 reached the 16th place on the Oricon weekly ranking of manga and, as of May 11, 2014, has sold 162,618 copies; volume 8 reached the 10th place and, as of August 3, 2014, has sold 124,788 copies.

== See also ==
- Shortcake Cake – Another manga series by the same author duo.
- A Sign of Affection – Another manga series by the same author duo.
