= Tail of the Moon =

Japanese manga series

- Cover of the first volume of manga in Bunko edition

月のしっぽ
- Genre: Romance, Historical, Adventure, Comedy
- Manga
- Written by: Rinko Ueda
- Published by: Shueisha
- English publisher: NA: Viz Media
- Magazine: Margaret
- Original run: 2002 – 2007
- Volumes: 15

Tail of the Moon (月のしっぽ, Tsuki no Shippo) is a Japanese shōjo manga series written and illustrated by Rinko Ueda. The series began serialization in Margaret magazine in 2002 and ran until 2007. The individual chapters have been collected into fifteen tankōbon volumes by Shueisha; the first on March 25, 2003 and the last on August 24, 2007. The series has been licensed by Viz Media for an English-language North American release as part of their Shojo Beat imprint.

== Plot ==
The story takes place in the Tenshō Era of Japan. Usagi is a bumbling ninja-in-training in her village in southern Iga. Though she is already fifteen, she is a terrible ninja and has made no progress whatsoever. As a result, her grandfather gives her a special mission: to go to Segachi, marry Hanzō Hattori, the leader of the main branch ninja family, and bear his child. She is accompanied by Mamezo, her longtime friend, companion, and foster child. Once they arrive it becomes apparent that Hanzō has no intention of marrying anyone, and worse yet, it seems Usagi has a much more refined rival. It is clear that as Usagi spends more time with Hanzō, she is growing on him, though the fact that he is constantly bombarded with new potential brides makes Usagi self-conscious.

== Characters ==
Usagi Momochi
She is a young ninja-in-training who seeks to marry Hanzō Hattori in order to bear his child for the sake of her family. Her one skill is the making of medicinal herbs because she suffers from constant stomach aches and sought to find a medicine that would cure them. She is rather inept as a ninja and widely considered a "ninja failure", though she steadily improves over time and eventually becomes a competent ninja. She's in love with Shim-no-Hanzō. Usagi is very kind-hearted, such as when she tries to get Kami no Hanzō and Princess Sara together because she hopes it would make Hanzō happy, and innocent, having learned how babies are made when her friend Kame only after she instructs Usagi on how to seduce Ranmaru in order for them to escape his prison alive. She becomes a better ninja after an attack on Iga. In the end, she and Shimo-no-Hanzo have a family together with three girls and a son named Hanzo (including Mamezo) Usagi is an orphan; her father was apparently killed by a bear on the "Mountain of Death" and her mother died in childbirth along with the baby.
Hanzō Hattori (服部 半蔵, Hattori Hanzō), or Shimo-no-Hanzō (下の半蔵, Shimo-no-Hanzō)
A dedicated and talented young ninja who is head of the Hattori clan of Segachi. He is also called Shimo-no-Hanzō (下の半蔵, Shimo-no-Hanzō) to distinguish him from the two other people named "Hanzō Hattori" (including the historical Hanzō Hattori). Since Hanzō was eleven, he held the difficult position of leading the weakening Hattori clan. He at first he opposed getting married because of his love for Sara but as he spends more time with Usagi he helps her do better in ninjutsu and falls in love with her. In the end, he and Usagi have a family together with three girls and a son named Hanzo (including Mamezo).
Mamezo
Usagi's constant companion and foster child. He is a young boy who looks to be between six and eight years old, although he seems somewhat more skilled in everyday tasks than Usagi, even helping her to get dressed. When Mamezo was a baby, he was found by Usagi's dog, Shiro, and it is believed by Hanzō that Mamezo's fear of dogs stems from this incident. Later on, it seems that Mamezo's deepest wish is to have Usagi as his mother and to have Hanzō as his father. Eventually, Mamezo encounters his real parents who reject him, as his father tries to force him to forget his past and his mother states that she cannot love him as much as she loves his baby brother, thus making Mamezo permanently cut ties with them. Mamezo's grandfather entrusts him to Usagi's care after knowing that Mamezo can never become a court noble. Mamezo later becomes engaged to his childhood friend, Watari and becomes a skillful shinobi ninja.
Yuri Fujibayashi (藤林 百合, Fujibayashi Yuri)
Usagi's rival. Yuri is more talented than Usagi at ninjutsu, but seems to be threatened by the way Usagi's good-natured and straightforward behavior seems to affect Hanzō. Shortly after she arrives, she attempts to poison Usagi but fails due to Usagi's immunity. Later, she develops a girlish crush (which later develops to full-on romantic feelings) on Goemon, mentioning to Usagi how "lucky" she is to have Goemon so devoted to her. She claimed to have been qualified as a ninja at the age of seven, though Hanzō finds out that it had actually been Yuri's twin sister, Yuna, who achieved the feat. Yuri's desperation and ruthless determination to become a ninja had been to escape the shadow of her sister. She sees her grandfather and friend die during the attack on Iga, becomes a qualified ninja, and forms a relationship with Goemon.
Hanzou Hattori (服部 半蔵, Hattori Hanzou), or Kami-no-Hanzou (上の半蔵, Kami-no-Hanzou)
A relative of Shimo-no-Hanzō Hattori, this Hanzou is the historical (Hattori Hanzō) and is from the Hattori clan of Okazaki in Upper Iga, hence his being referred to as Kami-no-Hanzō (上の半蔵 "Upper-(Iga)-Hanzō") to distinguish him from the other ninja also named "Hanzō Hattori" (including his father Yasunaga). While he is a notorious playboy, he is in a relationship with Sara, the daughter of Oda Nobunaga. Their relationship is one that his father reservedly accepts, not only because (as the manservant of Tokugawa Ieyasu) the Hattori clan is current warring against her father, but also her father's aim to obliterate all ninja in Japan. He is devoted to and protective of Sara, refusing to allow her to go on an assignment because she is pregnant with their child. They eventually have a daughter named Kaguya. Hanzō compares him to Hikaru Genji from The Tale of Genji.
Princess Sara
The daughter of the feudal warlord Oda Nobunaga, Princess Sara is a talented ninja but is considered an enemy by many ninja clans due to her father's actions and assassins are regularly sent after her. She is attended by a loyal retainer, Rikimaru, who is also a ninja. It is revealed that Sara climbs three mountains every day to stay fit. She once faked a marriage to Shimo-no-Hanzō to save Iga from an attack by her father and remains an ally of the ninja of Iga. Though she despises Kami-no-Hanzō's flirting, her love for him is so strong that she would rather die than live without him. She becomes pregnant with Kami-no-Hanzō's child. Her daughter Kaguya is eventually born after the attack on Iga and was delivered with Usagi's help.
Goemon Ishikawa (石川 五右衛門, Ishikawa Goemon)
He was once engaged to be married to Usagi, and grew up taking care of her in their ninja village. Goemon canceled the engagement because he so injured on an assignment that he felt he had no choice but to cancel it as he could no longer take of Usagi. However, he appears to still hold feelings for Usagi, and actively interferes with communications between Hanzō and Usagi. He is one of the few ninjas who survived the attack on Iga because he was on an assignment that night. When he breaks the code of the ninja and starts stealing money, Usagi stops him. While he remains protective of Usagi and greatly wishes for her happiness, he eventually marries Yuri.
Ieyasu Tokugawa (徳川 家康, Tokugawa Ieyasu)
Another feudal lord, Ieyasu's son and wife were killed by Princess Sara in the manga (although that is not historically true). Usagi first met him in the woods when gathering herbs to tend to a wounded soldier. Later, he stitched up Usagi's forehead when she ran into a wall and he hired her as a herbalist to assist his current herbalist, Yukimaru. After much begging on Usagi's part, he allows Sara and Kami-no-Hanzō to be together. Kami-no-Hanzō's father works for him and this is the reason that he will not allow Kami-no-Hanzō and Sara to be together. Usagi also inspires him to gain control of Japan in order to establish peace and prosperity. He lets Usagi work and lives with him.
Yukimaru (雪丸)
Ieyasu Tokugawa's chief herbalist, a beautiful young man who has studied western medicine. Originally Usagi believed him to be a woman, due to his good looks, while Yukimaru believed Usagi to be a boy. Yukimaru has a fear of women, and Usagi makes him uncomfortable, though he falls in love with her.
Ranmaru Mori
The most loyal follower underneath Oda Nobunaga. He is in charge of hunting down Iga ninja, but somehow falls deeply in love with Usagi. He even tries to have his way with her and goes so far as to say that as he was having sex with her best friend, Kame, while imagining it was with her. After the attack on Iga, he sets out to look for Usagi, but finds the dead and burned Kame, and later kidnaps Usagi. He is a bitter rival of Mitsuhide, who was granted the Sakamoto Castle, which had been previously held by Ranmaru's family. He dies protecting Usagi.
Kame
Usagi's best friend since childhood, they are like sisters to one another. She is a beautiful and outstanding ninja, but had once been picked on for being a slow learner and Usagi would have to save her. She graduated second-to-last, in front of only Usagi, as she would constantly give into Usagi's demands to play. When she discovers that Usagi is Hanzo's bride-elect, Kame is relieved that someone will care for Usagi when she cannot. While she loves Goemon, Kame becomes Ranmaru's lover in order to learn about the plans for the attack on Iga; she has no compunction whatsoever to seduce any man and kill him to protect her home and Usagi. Kame dies saving Usagi during the attack on Iga.
Mitsuhide Akechi
A loyal retainer of Nobunaga and the holder of Sakamoto Castle, Mitsuhide is thoughtful man with moderate political views and an open mind. He is a devoted husband and father to his wife, Hiroko, and their daughter, Tama. He suffers from failing eyesight. When Usagi makes medicine to improve his vision, Mitsuhide realizes that not all ninja are bad. He secretly helps the Iga ninja, though is eventually discovered by Ranmaru. Mitsuhide is forced to lead the eventual attack on Iga and Ranmaru's machinations force Mitsuhide out of Nobunaga's favour, Mitsuhide leads a rebellion against Nobunaga as revenge for Hiroko, who committed suicide in hopes it would atone for Mitsuhide's perceived slight on Nobunaga. Though Mitsuhide is believed to have died in the attack after being captured by Toyotomi Hideyoshi's forces, he continues to secretly live as a monk named Tenkai with Ieyasu.
Oda Nobunaga
A powerful warlord conquering clans in Japan and on the verge of unifying the entire nation, Nobunaga is temperamental and despises all ninja, but is also known for recognizing a person for their abilities rather than their social status. He is the father of Princess Sara, as well as Sara's older sister Toku and her brother Nobukatsu. His constant shifting moods make him unpredictable, forcing many lords like Mitsuhide and Ieyasu to act extremely carefully around him. Usagi's talents eventually reach him and he forces her to remain as his herbalist, which she agrees to for the sake of finding Hanzō and dissuading him from taking revenge for the destruction of Iga. During Mitsuhide's revolt, Hanzō pretends to kill Nobunaga to appease Mitsuhide's desire for revenge, but really doesn't, and Nobunaga walks into the flames Mitsuhide had created and is found dead after the fires burn out.

== Manga ==
Written and drawn by Rinko Ueda, Tail of the Moon Prequel: The Other Hanzo(u) (月の吐息 愛の傷, Tsuki no Toiki no Ai no Kizu) was originally published as a oneshot in Margaret magazine in 2001, but was soon followed by another oneshot, Tsuki no Toiki Natsu no Yume (月の吐息 夏の夢) in 2002, and then the series, Tail of the Moon. The Tail of the Moon manga was serialized in Margaret from 2002 until its completion in 2007. Both the prequel and the series are licensed by Viz Media in North America for an English language release as part of their Shojo Beat line of manga. Viz also previewed the series in their now-defunct Shojo Beat magazine. The series is also licensed for release in Taiwan by Sharp Point Press. Beginning in October 2010, the series is being re-released as bunko editions in Japan.

== Reception ==
Tail of the Moon volume 10 was the 20th best-selling graphic novel for the month of April 2008.
