= Margaret (magazine) =

Japanese manga magazine by Shueisha

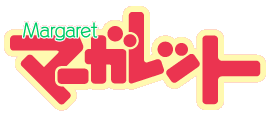

- Issue 12 cover of Margaret from 2010, featuring Usotsuki Lily by Ayumi Komura, released on May 20, 2010
- Categories: Shōjo manga
- Frequency: Weekly (1963–1987); Bi-weekly (since 1988)
- Circulation: 13,500; (July–September 2026)
- Founded: 1963
- Company: Shueisha
- Country: Japan
- Language: Japanese
- Website: margaret.shueisha.co.jp

Margaret (Japanese: マーガレット, Hepburn: Māgaretto) is a bi-weekly shōjo manga magazine, published by Shueisha on the 5th and 20th of every month. Its title was stylized in Latin script between 1988 and 1990. It is published in print in B5 format. As of October 2018, a digital version of each issue is available on the same day as the print edition.

== History ==
Margaret was first launched as a weekly manga magazine in May 1963. It is Shueisha's second-oldest active publication. The magazine was known as Weekly Margaret (週刊マーガレット) from 1963 to 1987, when it was renamed to Margaret in 1988 and moved to a bi-weekly publication schedule, with issues released on the 5th and 20th of each month.

When manga serialized in Margaret are collected into tankōbon volumes, they are published under the Margaret Comics imprint. Series from sister magazine Bessatsu Margaret are also published under the Margaret Comics imprint. Margaret's other sister magazine, The Margaret, was published quarterly until its disbandment in 2023.

In 2009, the circulation was 154,584. However, the circulation dropped to 95,044 in 2010. The publisher reported its average circulation was 16,000 as of February 2022 and 11,000 as of December 2023. As of 2016, the magazine is also published online.

Margaret's target demographic is middle school and high school girls, as well as young adult women. Based on a survey conducted by Shueisha in 2023, the majority of Margaret's readership is teenagers, with 21.6% of readers aged 10–14, 30.0% aged 15–19, and 17.6% aged 20–24.

== Serializations ==
=== Current ===
- Anyway I'd Rather Be in Love Than Cry (2022–present)
- Ayakashi-san to Tagaime no Hanayome (2019–present)
- Black Marriage (2020–present)
- Fukakouryoku no I Love You (2023–present)
- Heartbeat in a Corner (2024–present)
- Kaijuu no Hanataba (2024–present)
- Naisho no Kawaikochan (2023–present)
- Nidome no Koi wa, Hayami-kun to (2023–present)
- Please! Mr. Idol (2022–present)
- Sentimental Kiss (2020–present)
- Tsuki to Taiyou no Love Game (2022–present)
- Warui Ko demo Ii no (2018–present)
- Yojōhan no Ibarahime (2023–present)

=== Past ===
==== 1963–1979 ====
- Sarutobi Ecchan (1964–1969)
- Lemon to Sakuranbo (1966)
- Kiri no Naka no Shoujo (1966–1967)
- Ringo no Tsumi (1968)
- Attack No. 1 (1968–1971)
- Tanjou! (1970–1971)
- Mona Lisa no Heya (1971)
- The Two Daughters (1971)
- The Rose of Versailles (1972–1973)
- Mimoza Yakata de Tsukamaete (1973)
- Oh My Lord! (1973–1974)
- Aim for the Ace! (1973–1980)
- Oniisama e... (1974)
- The Etude of Shouko (1974)
- The Window of Orpheus (1975–1981)
- Oujisama ga ii no! (1976)
- Swan (1976–1981)
- U wa Uchuusen no U (1977–1978)
- Claudine (1978)
- Otasukebito Hashiru! (1979)

==== 1980–1989 ====
- Yūkan Club (1982–2002)
- Hikari no Densetsu (1985–1988)
- Zetsuai 1989 (1989–1991)

==== 1990–1999 ====
- Boys Over Flowers (1992–2008)
- Bronze: Zetsuai Since 1989 (1992–1996)

==== 2000–2009 ====
- Parfait Tic! (2000–2007)
- Love Monster (2002–2006)
- Tail of the Moon (2002–2007)
- Maria-sama ga Miteru (2003–2010)
- Yokujō Climax (2004–2006)
- Ginban Kaleidoscope (2005–2006)
- Mixed Vegetables (2005–2007)
- Switch Girl!! (2006–2014)
- Mei-chan no Shitsuji (2006–2013)
- Stepping on Roses (2007–2012)
- A Devil and Her Love Song (2007–2011)
- Demon Love Spell (2008–2014)

==== 2010–2019 ====
- Mairunovich (2010–2014)
- Daytime Shooting Star (2011–2014)
- Fudanjuku Monogatari (2011)
- Like a Butterfly (2012–2015)
- Neko to Watashi no Kinyōbi (2013–2015)
- Kakugo wa Ii ka Soko no Joshi (2014)
- Tsubaki-chou Lonely Planet (2015–2019)
- Shortcake Cake (2015–2019)
- Akuma ni Chic × Hack (2016–2017)

==== 2020-present ====
- Pink & Habanero (2021–2025)
