= Dragon Girl =

Dragon Girl may refer to:

- Dragongirl, a 2010 American science fiction novel by Todd McCaffrey in the Dragonriders of Pern series
- St. Dragon Girl, a 1999–2003 Japanese manga by Natsumi Matsumoto
- Longnü, an acolyte of the bodhisattva Avalokiteśvara in Chinese Buddhism, daughter of the Dragon King
- Xiaolongnü, a fiction character in the 1959–1961 Chinese novel The Return of the Condor Heroes, also translated as "Dragon Girl"
- Ladki: Dragon Girl, a 2022 Indian martial arts film by Ram Gopal Varma
