= Blue Friend =

Blue Friend may refer to:

- Blue Friend (RahXephon), an episode of RahXephon
- Blue Friend (manga), a 2011 yuri manga
