= Mayu Sakai =

Japanese manga artist (born 1982)

Mayu Sakai 酒井まゆ
- Born: January 7, 1982 (age 44) Fussa, Tokyo, Japan
- Area: Manga artist
- Notable works: Rockin' Heaven, Sugar Soldier

Mayu Sakai (酒井まゆ, Sakai Mayu; born January 7, 1982) is a Japanese manga artist who once worked as an assistant to Miho Obana. Her works were initially serialized in Ribon before being published in tankōbon volumes by Shueisha. She has also been featured in one of Shueisha's shōnen publications, Jump SQ.

== Career ==
Sakai attended Ribon Manga School and debuted as a manga artist during her third year in high school.

== Works ==
| Title | Year | Notes | Refs |
|---|---|---|---|
| Puraimaru Orenji (プライマル·オレンジ; lit. Primal Orange) | 2000 | Published by Shueisha | |
| Gogatsu Shōjo (五月少女; lit. Girl in May) | 2001 | Published by Shueisha | |
| Boku Tachi no Tabi (ボクたちの旅; lit. Our Journey) | 2001–02 | Serialized in Ribon; Published by Shueisha, 5 volumes | |
| Purachina (プラチナ; lit. Platinum ) | 2002 | Published by Shueisha | |
| Ichigo Namida (イチゴナミダ; lit. Strawberry Tears) | 2002 | Published by Shueisha | |
| Jū-ni-gatsu no Maria (12月のマリア) | 2002 | Published by Shueisha | |
| Nain Pazuru (ナインパズル; lit. Nine Puzzle) | 2002 | Serialized in Ribon; Published by Shueisha, 2 volumes | |
| Nagatachō Sutoroberī (永田町ストロベリィ) | 2002–04 | Serialized in Ribon; Published by Shueisha, 5 volumes | |
| Boku ha Mahou ga Tsukaenai (ぼくは魔法が使えない, Boku wa Mahou ga Tsukaenai) | 2003 | Published by Shueisha | |
| Beibī, Feiku*Fā (ベイビー、フェイク*ファー; lit. Baby, Fake*Fur) | 2004 | Published by Shueisha | |
| Peter Pan Syndrome | 2004–05 | Serialized in Ribon; Published by Shueisha, 2 volumes | |
| Ou-sama to Ouji-sama to Watashi. (王様と王子様と私.) | 2005 | Published by Shueisha | |
| Endoresu Māchi (エンドレス·マーチ; lit. Endless March) | 2005 | Published by Shueisha | |
| Rockin' Heaven | 2005–08 | Serialized in Ribon; Published by Shueisha, 8 volumes | |
| Momo | 2008–11 | Serialized in Ribon; Published by Shueisha, 7 volumes | |
| Sugar Soldier | 2011–15 | Serialized in Ribon; Published by Shueisha, 10 volumes | |
| Kuremachika kutsu-ten (クレマチカ靴店; Kuremachika Shoe Store) | | Serialized in Ribon; Published by Shueisha, 1 volume | |
| Merībaddoendo sakai mayu tanhenshū (メリーバッドエンド酒井まゆ短編集; lit. 'Merry Bad Ending Mayu Sakai short stories') | | Serialized in Ribon; Published by Shueisha, 1 volume | |
| Hello, Innocent | | Serialized in Ribon; Published by Shueisha | |
