= Love-Berrish! =

Manga

- Cover art of the Italian release volume 5 featuring Yūya and Nagisa.

ラブ・ベリッシュ! (Rabu Berisshu!)
- Genre: Romantic comedy
- Manga
- Written by: Nana Haruta
- Published by: Shueisha
- Imprint: Ribon Mascot Comics
- Magazine: Ribon
- Original run: August 3, 2005 – May 2007
- Volumes: 5

Love-Berrish! (Japanese: ラブ・ベリッシュ！, Hepburn: Rabu Berisshu!) is a Japanese shōjo manga series by Nana Haruta. Love-Berrish! was serialized in the monthly manga magazine Ribon from August 2005 to May 2007. During the series' run, a drama CD was released in 2005.

== Plot ==
Yūya Fukushima decides to enroll in Natsuka Academy, a boarding high school, but is reassigned to live in Raspberry Dorm with five other students: Azusa Chiba, Nagisa Takamatsu, Emika Muto, Ame Yamanashi, and Kon Miyagi. Yūya is initially offended by her dormmates' quirkiness, but she is encouraged to stay by Azusa and falls in love with him. At the same time, she discovers that the occupants of the Raspberry Dorm are socially ostracized from the school, and she decides to support and defend her dormmates from the bullying.

== Characters ==
- Yūya Fukushima (福島 由夜, Fukushima Yūya)

Voiced By: Hitomi Nabatame
15-year-old Yūya Fukushima initially finds the people in her dorm strange and wanted to transfer out, but after a talk with Azusa, she chooses to stay and begins befriending her dormmates. Yūya is touched by Azusa's watchful and genuine kindness, which leads to her falling in love with him. In contrast, she is often personally annoyed by Nagisa's indifferent and rude behaviour. However, as the story progresses afterwards, Yūya falls in love with Nagisa, only realising it after a long time and confessing at the end.
She is a single child; her mother died when Yuya was in the first year of middle school. Yuya initially thought that her father sent her away to boarding school to get her out of the way, but later finds out that it was because both her parents had attended there before, and that her mother wanted Yuya to go there too.

- Nagisa Takamatsu (高松 渚, Takamatsu Nagisa)

Voiced By: Akira Ishida
The eldest of four siblings, the indifferent Nagisa also lives in Raspberry Dorm and attends Natsuka Academy. Despite being temperamental and sometimes physically violent, he is popular at school. Although he talks cryptically and rudely to Yūya, the rest of the Raspberry Dorm insist that he is good at heart. Because he keeps quiet about his thoughts, Yūya often has trouble figuring out his motives. He has been friends with Chiba since middle school. He quickly realized Yūya has a crush on Azusa but it was unclear whether he was trying to hinder a relationship between them or encourage it. Nagisa develops feelings for Yūya and clearly demonstrates his jealousy towards the fact that Yuya still has lingering feelings for Azusa, even after he got back together with Ako. He gets together with Yūya in the end.
He was transferred to Raspberry Dorm due to a violent incident involving a teacher. He did not get expelled as Azusa believed Nagisa would not have done that without a good reason, so talked the teachers into letting him stay.

- Azusa Chiba (千葉 梓, Chiba Azusa)

Voiced By: Kenji Nojima
Azusa is extremely popular and many girls, including Yūya, tend to think of him as a "Prince" due to his good looks and kind nature. He is the student representative at Natsuka Academy, and is at the top of his class. He was the dorm president in middle school. He does his best to help keep the peace in the Raspberry Dorm, especially between Nagisa and Yūya. Azusa and Nagisa appear to be close friends, but Nagisa dislikes his self-sacrificing nature. This was demonstrated when Azusa broke up with his girlfriend in middle school, Ako, because he believed she was truly in love with Nagisa.
He transferred to Raspberry Dorm due to an agreement with teachers, where he was to watch over Nagisa.

- Emika Mito (水戸 笑佳, Mito Emika)

Voiced By: Yukari Tamura
Quirky and outgoing, Emika is a bubbly and childish illeist, often referring to herself as "Emi." Her curiosity leads her to asking strange questions, although she is naive and innocent about the whole situation. She is particularly amazed with Yūya's bra size and wistfully wishes to have a bust as large as hers. On the contrary, when Emika first attended Natsuka Academy, she was quiet, shy, and was unable to make friends until Kon began talking to her. However, she transferred to the Raspberry Dorm to escape Yukino's bullying advances. She is very close friends with Kon, but is naively unaware about his feelings towards her, until the end.

- Kon Miyagi (宮城 紺, Miyagi Kon)

Voiced By: Takahiro Mizushima
16-year-old Kon is a close friend of Emika's. He has been in the same class with her for five consecutive years and is in love with Emika. He believed his love was unrequited, until the end when Emika realised how she felt about Kon.
He transferred to Raspberry Dorm after breaking an expensive vase in the teacher's lounge.

- Ame Yamanashi (山梨 雨芽, Yamanashi Ame)

Although described as a graceful beauty and won the school's beauty contest. She's also a transgender girl. Yūya suspects that Ame and Azusa are in a relationship, and Ame comes out to her, which ease her worries. Ame met Azusa and Nagisa in junior high, when she had to dress as a guy, and lived in the Watermelon Dormitory, the dorm for boys. She began dressing as a girl in her third year and applied for the girls dorm, White Peach, but many of the teachers rejected the idea and made her live in the Raspberry Dorm instead. She always skips PE because she was registered as a male and is required to take PE with the guys.

- Michelle La France (ミシェル・ラ・フランス, Misheru Ra Furansu)

Voiced By: Sayori Ishizuka
Michelle is the Raspberry Dorm's cat. She scratches Yūya the first time she meets her, and seems to take a liking only to Azusa. Azusa and Yuuya are the only ones who call her Mī-chan (ミーちゃん, Mī-chan); the rest dub her "Fugly".

- Junko Utsunomiya (宇都宮 純子, Utsunomiya Junko)

Voiced By: Megumi Toyoguchi
The head of the Raspberry Dorm.

- Marina Shimizu (清水 まりな, Shimizu Marina)

A classmate of Yūya, she is scornful and rude towards all the members of the Raspberry Dorm except for Azusa, whom she adores. Although she bullied Yūya, Yūya tries to befriend her when Azusa proposes a sports festival idea. During practise for the festival, Shimizu defends Yūya when others gave up on her and eventually gets along with Yūya in her own way. She seems to dislike Nagisa.

- Ako Okayama (岡山 亜子, Ako Okayama)

Ako is a friend of Nagisa and Azusa from middle school, and was Nagisa's childhood friend. She dated Azusa, though Nagisa was also in love with her. After an incident regarding Nagisa, Azusa broke up with her because he believed that Ako loved Nagisa more than she loved him. Ako gradually began to pretend to herself that she loved Nagisa, though deep in her heart she still knew that the one she loved was Azusa. At the Summer Festival, Nagisa confessed to Ako that he liked her to make her realize that she actually loved Azusa. He then reassured her that Azusa still loved her too and that they should get back together.

- Yukino Toyohashi (豊橋 雪乃, Toyohashi Yukino)

Yukino is the first friend Emika made at Natsuka Academy when the two were in middle school. Although they grew close, at the same time, Yukino felt more possessive towards Emika when she began making other friends. In a desperate attempt to save their friendship, Yukino often threatened to hurt Emika's new friend unless she broke off that friendship. When she returns to Emika's life and develops a jealousy towards Yūya and Ame, she tries to keep Emika to herself by locking her in an empty classroom. However, Emika is rescued by the efforts of Yūya, Ame, and Kon. Reminded by Kon that she used to be as lonely as Yukino was, Emika forgives her.

== Media ==
=== Manga ===
Love-Berrish! is written and illustrated by Nana Haruta. It was serialized in the monthly magazine Ribon from August 2004 to May 2007. The chapters were later released in five bound volumes by Shueisha under the Ribon Mascot Comics imprint. Moe Yukimaru, the author of Hiyokoi, was one of Haruta's assistants in working on the manga.

No.	Japanese release date	Japanese ISBN
1	February 15, 2006	978-4-08-856668-9
2	July 14, 2006	978-4-08-856692-4
3	December 15, 2006	978-4-08-856718-1
4	April 13, 2007	978-4-08-856736-5
5	August 10, 2007	978-4-08-856761-7

=== Drama CD ===
A drama CD adaptation featuring Love-Berrish!, along with ChocoMimi and Animal Yokochō, was released as a mail-order gift with the December 2005 issue of Ribon.
