= Sugar Soldier =

Manga and television anime

- Cover of Sugar Soldier vol. 1 by Shueisha.

シュガー＊ソルジャー (Shugā Sorujā)
- Genre: Romantic comedy
- Manga
- Written by: Mayu Sakai
- Published by: Shueisha
- Magazine: Ribon
- Original run: September 2011 – August 2015
- Volumes: 10
- Anime television series
- Original network: TV Tokyo
- Original run: January 14, 2014 – January 28, 2014
- Episodes: 3

Sugar Soldier (シュガー＊ソルジャー, Shugā Sorujā) is a Japanese manga series by Mayu Sakai, that was serialized in Shueisha's shōjo manga magazine Ribon from September 2011 to August 2015. It has been collected in ten tankōbon volumes. An anime adaptation aired from January 14 to January 28, 2014, as a segment on TV Tokyo's children's television series Oha Star.

== Characters ==
- Makoto Kisaragi (如月 麻琴, Kisaragi Makoto) Voiced by: Inori Minase

15-year-old high school girl with low self-esteem and pessimistic attitude, has an inferiority complex with her big sister Rika. She decided to change and to be cute more. She became the girlfriend of Shun Iriya later on, a popular guy in their class.

The protagonist. A high school freshman. A negative girl with a tendency to be delusional. Ever since she was little, she has been compared to her beautiful older sister, Rika, and even now she has a complex about her sister, who is famous as a magazine model, and has no confidence in herself. Because of this, she rejected a confession from a boy who liked her in middle school, and ended up breaking up with him, hurting him, and has a bitter past. Even after entering high school, the other students, except for her childhood friend Amagi, only see her as "the little sister of a famous model." However, when she meets Iriya on the day of the entrance ceremony, he sees her as a girl named Kisaragi Makoto and treats her kindly, so she gradually begins to like him. Eventually, she learns of Iriya's past through a certain incident, and reaffirms her feelings and resolves to "become stronger." After coming to terms with her past with Watase, the two finally become a couple. They share a first kiss on chapter 30 on Christmas Day.

Birthday: October 4 . Libra. Type O. 156 cm. 44 kg.

- Shun Iriya (入谷 瞬, Iriya Shun) Voiced by: Ryota Osaka

Makoto's classmate. A bright and kind boy, he is popular in class. Unlike the other students, he did not know that Makoto's sister was a model, so he treats her without any preconceived notions about her being a "model's sister." He knows that Makoto has a complex about her sister, and he is very concerned about her. He was neglected and abandoned by her biological mother during his childhood, and is currently living as an adopted child with her aunt. For the reasons mentioned above, he became afraid of being rejected or abandoned by others, and so he played the role of the ideal prince who was liked by everyone. However, he was attracted to Makoto, who was the complete opposite of him, and although she was clumsy, she always tried her best at everything, he hate carrots. Become a boyfriend of Makoto later on.

Birthday: July 31 . Leo. AB type. 175.5 cm. 56 kg.

- Rika Kisaragi (如月 莉華, Kisaragi Rika)

Voiced by: Ai Kayano

17 years old, Makoto's older sister and a famous reader model. She has been known since she was a child for her beauty and charismatic presence among girls, and is also super popular with boys. Although she is the source of Makoto's complexes, she gets along well with her sister and dotes on her very much. Her eye-catching looks and assertive personality often earned her the backlash of her classmates and other models, and while she stood up to the odds, she also felt lonely. She has reportedly had relationships with several men in the industry in the past, but all of them ended in a short period of time. She is currently dating, an apprentice photographer Naoki Senda.

Birthday: August 22 . Leo. Type A. 162 cm. 42 kg.

- Uki Morinaga (森永 雨季, Morinaga Uki)

Makoto's classmate. She has known Makoto since elementary school and is one of the few people who understands her. She is a member of the basketball club. Although she is beautiful, she is a boyish, athletic girl with a straightforward personality, making her more popular with girls than boys. From the moment they first met, he showed his large-heartedness by getting along with Shirayuki, whom he met at high school, without being put off by her strong personality.

Birthday: June 9 . Gemini. Type B. 162 cm. 47 kg.

- Nanami Shirayuki (白雪 ななみ, Shirayuki Nanami)

A girl who was a classmate of Makoto's in junior high school. She likes Gothic Lolita fashion and is a unique character who often speaks in a poetic and mysterious way. Due to his strong personality, he is often shunned by those around him and has few friends, but he is kind at heart and is a good friend to Makoto, sometimes giving her advice based on his own experiences. Despite being a girl, she is beginning to be attracted to Amagi, who is of the same sex. Because she knows that her feelings will never be fulfilled, she secretly supports Amagi's own happiness and Yusa's affection for her.

Birthday: March 3. Pisces. Blood type: AB. 154.5 cm. 42 kg.

- Issei Yusa (遊佐 一誓, Yusa Issei)

He is in the same class as Makoto and Iriya (though in a different class). He is a handsome man with sharp eyes who is called the "Prince of the West Building" by the girls, in contrast to Iriya, who is known as the "Prince of the East Building". He has a rough personality. For some reason, he lived with Iriya for a time in his childhood, and they are friends and know about his past. He cares for Iriya above all else, and is merciless, yelling at and chasing away girls who are attracted to him by his appearance. He behaves quite violently towards Makoto when they first meet, and even after he accepts their relationship, he frequently shows jealousy towards Makoto. He and Amagi have similar personalities and often argue, but at the same time, he seems to be beginning to be attracted to her as a member of the opposite sex. According to the second volume of the book, her family is full of interesting people.

Birthday: January 29 . Aquarius. Blood type: B. 177 cm. 60 kg

- Tomoya Watase (渡瀬, Watase Tomoya)

A boy who was Makoto's classmate in junior high school. He liked her since they were in the first year of junior high school, and tried to confess his feelings to her, but was rejected as mentioned above. Shortly after that, he transferred schools due to family circumstances, and after entering high school, they met again by chance at a soccer club match. He was unable to play soccer due to an injury and was in despair, but after meeting Iriya and the others, he gradually began to look forward. He is currently dating, a soccer manager Toyoda Shiho.

- Naoki Senda

He is a young man who works as an assistant to a professional photographer, and in contrast to the strong-willed Rika, he gives off a gentle and unreliable impression. After accidentally photographing Rika in a bad mood, the two begin dating. Feeling a disparity between Rika, who is having a brilliant career as a model, and himself, who is not making much progress as a photographer, he decides to break up with her, but after being scolded by Makoto, he decides to face her again and confesses his feelings to her again.

- Yoshiaki Kudo

He is a biology teacher and has been the homeroom teacher for Makoto, Uki, and Shirayuki since their second year. He is a gentle man with long hair who has a sarcastic attitude towards his students. He is an old friend of Amagi's older brother, Ritsuka, and the three of them, including Amagi when he was young, often played together. From a casual verbal promise they made, their relationship has remained ambiguous to the present day, more than friends but less than lovers.

- Shiori Iriya

Iriya Shun's biological mother. She gave birth to Shun at a young age, and even now, more than ten years later, she has a beautiful appearance that makes her look like she is in her early twenties. She is the person who neglected Shun. He comes from a distinguished family in Kyoto, but after an incident in middle school, he stopped going home and was disowned by his parents. Sayuri, Shun's current adoptive mother, is her real sister. She later had a brain tumor and was in a state where she had no time left to live, which she said was "divine punishment".

- Ken Yusa (Yusa Ken)

He is Yusa Issei's uncle and works at a nearby police station. He is a calm and fair person, and calmly supports Iriya Shun, who is under suspicion of a certain matter. He has known Iriya since childhood, and has even saved him from a crisis through his work. His mother works at an orphanage.

- Maria Serizawa

A woman whom Iriya Shun met at the coffee shop where he worked part-time. She has wavy, shoulder-length hair parted in the middle and strong, slanted eyes. But they clash over differences of opinion. She likes Iriya and gets close to him and force to kiss him after his duty on coffee shop but rejected afterward. In revenge, she tries to accuse him of something he did not do.

- Hiro Kishino

A classmate of Kisaragi Makoto and friends. She has short bangs and a lively atmosphere, and is on good terms with Iriya Shun, calling them "Iriyan" and "Hiro." She likes Makoto, who is busy preparing for the school festival, and actively talks to her, saying that she seems "timid and obedient, and I want to protect her."

- Ricca Morinaga

Morinaga Uki's older brother. Like his sister, he is a cheerful and active person, and became friends with Kuon Yoshiaki when he was hospitalized for medical treatment. He has a lot of friends, and Ritsuka's friends are always at Uki's house, so much so that Kisaragi Makoto says that she cannot remember them all individually.

- Aida

A boy who was a classmate of Kisaragi Makoto and her friends in their second year and is a member of the boys' basketball club. He started talking to Makoto after they were in the same group on the school trip. He felt inferior to Makoto because she was close to Iriya Shun, the most popular guy in their grade, but when he got to know her true personality, he immediately became interested in her. At first glance, he seems friendly, but he sometimes acts forcefully without considering Makoto's pace.

- Sayuri Iriya

She is the foster mother of Iriya Shun. She is also the older sister of Iriya Shiori, who abandoned him and disappeared. In contrast to her sister, she is a calm, gentle and loving woman. Since taking in her nephew, Iriya, she has treated him as if he were her own son, and the family relationship is good. However, behind this lies a sad past with Shiori.

- Nana Shirayuki Grandmother

She is Nanami Shirayuki's biggest supporter and is loved as "Grandma". She respected and protected her since she was a child, even though she had a different aura from the people around her. She has a villa in Hayama, and it was she who offered it as a travel destination for Makoto Kisaragi and the others. Like Shirayuki, she is good at handicrafts.

- Sasaki

Rika Kisaragi's middle school teacher. A young woman with long hair tied up in a ponytail and round glasses. It was well known that she was hostile towards Rika, who was glamorous and eye-catching, and would attack her. She hates students dressing up, and tends to be overly strict in her instruction.

- Tsukkomi Rabbit

He is the mascot character of this work, looking like a stuffed rabbit. He often appears in situations where Makoto is around and comments on her behavior without any context, but he himself is not acknowledged by Makoto and the others, and he never speaks to them directly. He sometimes takes the lead role in the extra four-panel comics that are occasionally published in "Ribon Special".

== Media ==
- Overview :

This is a classic school love comedy drawn by Mayu Sakai, who has produced a string of fantasy-inspired works such as "MOMO" and "Kurematica Shoe Store." The story follows the protagonist, whose sister is a famous reader model, as she tries to become more cute when she enters high school.

With a total of 47 chapters, this is Sakai's longest-running work to date.

The theme of the story is overcoming complexes and emotional scars. A girl who was unable to love herself and tended to hide in the shadows of others. Fights against her own weakness in order to become the person she wants to be. The story depicts how the people around her are influenced by this and how her high school life changes for the better.

- Insert song on anime pv - Sugar Soldier (シュガー＊ソルジャー) by Inori Minase

Lyrics - Mayu Sakai / Composition - MEG.ME / Singer - Makoto Kisaragi

- this song used in anime pv on background and only obtain via cd/dics and not available on any music download/platforms.

- Synopsis :

The romantic comedy centers around Makoto Kisaragi, a 15-year-old girl whose "special ability" is her persecution complex. She was raised well but in relative obscurity compared to her big sister, a famous model. Despite her negative personality, Makoto vowed to become popular when she entered high school, but things did not turn out quite so well for her. From the time she was a child, Makoto was always compared to her famous older sister. So she decided to become just as awesome as her sister for her entrance to high school. But it did not really work. One day, he meets Shun Iriya, a popular boy in their school, and they become friends. Suddenly, Makoto cannot make her heart stop beating so fast? So now, she cannot stop thinking about her school life.

- High School Entrance (1–7)

Makoto Kisaragi, whose sister is a popular magazine model, has always been compared to her sister Rika Kisaragi since she was a child, and as a result, she has become a girl who has no confidence in herself. When she enters high school, she is determined to change herself, but she immediately fails. She is saved by her classmate Shun Iriya, who has a glamorous aura . Makoto is touched by his kind and smart help and takes a step forward as if guided by his back.

When grouped for the spring field trip, Makoto is placed in the same group as Shun. Her friend Uki Morinaga joins her and she is excited for the day, but she is swayed by the unique behavior of Nanami Shirayuki, who is in the same group, and becomes anxious. Then, on the day of the field trip, Makoto sees Iriya being confessed to by a girl. His reaction is coincidentally just as Shirayuki warned him.

After the field trip, Makoto's relationship with Shun has deepened. However, she witnesses her sister Rika meeting Shun. Makoto is hurt by the closeness between the two and feels disheartened, wondering, "Why am I not the big sister?" An unexpected person saves her from her drowning state.

- Yusa's Appearance (8–18)

With the misunderstanding with Iriya Shun cleared up, Makoto Kisaragi continues to work hard to gain confidence in herself. However, her classmate, Issei Yusa, who does not like the attention Iriya has been getting because of Makoto, appears and threatens Makoto not to get any closer to him. However, Makoto musters up her courage and argues against him.

At the end of the first semester, Nanami Shirayuki invites Makoto to her grandmother's villa. Makoto learns that Shun's birthday falls during the trip and so she invites him, prepared to give up. Her feelings come to fruition, and the group of five, including Uki Morinaga and Yusa, heads off on the trip. However, on her birthday, which she had made thorough preparations for, Makoto realizes that she has lost something important just before the party.

After returning from her trip, Makoto decides to work hard to improve herself. At that time, she receives a phone call from Yusa. Informed that Iriya is in a critical condition, Makoto rushes out in her loungewear. There is an incident connected to Iriya's past.

=== Manga ===
| No. | Release date | ISBN |
|---|---|---|
| 1 | February 15, 2012 | 978-4-08-867177-2 |
| 2 | June 15, 2012 | 978-4-08-867204-5 |
| 3 | October 15, 2012 | 978-4-08-867228-1 |
| 4 | March 15, 2013 | 978-4-08-867260-1 |
| 5 | August 9, 2013 | 978-4-08-867280-9 |
| 6 | January 15, 2014 | 978-4-08-867304-2 |
| 7 | June 13, 2014 | 978-4-08-867326-4 |
| 8 | November 14, 2014 | 978-4-08-867344-8 |
| 9 | April 24, 2015 | 978-4-08-867365-3 |
| 10 | August 25, 2015 | 978-4-08-867383-7 |
