= Ayumi Shiina =

Japanese manga artist

Ayumi Shiina (椎名 あゆみ, Shiina Ayumi; born August 29, 1969) is a Japanese shōjo manga artist. Her debut was in 1987 with the story Namida no Message, published in the Autumn issue of Ribon Original. She has since published her manga in Ribon and its spin-off magazines.

Notable works by her are Baby Love and Penguin Brothers. The former was adapted into an OVA, screened at a Ribon event and its video later given away as part of Ribon's mail order service.

== Works ==
- Peter Pan no Sora (ピーターパンの空) (1990, serialized in Ribon, Shueisha)
- Mind Game (マインド・ゲーム) (1990, serialized in Ribon, Shueisha)
- Muteki no Venus (無敵のヴィーナス) (1992–1993, Shueisha)
- Anata to Sukyandaru (あなたとスキャンダル, trans. You and Scandal) (1994–1995, Shueisha) (2008, reprint Shueisha)
- Baby Love (ベイビィ★LOVE) (1996–1999, serialized in Ribon, Shueisha) (2007, reprint Shueisha)
- Pengin Burazaazu (ペンギン☆ブラザーズ, Penguin Brothers) (2000–2002, serialized in Ribon, Shueisha)
- Otogibanashi o Anata ni (お伽話をあなたに, trans. A Fairytale for You) (2001, Shueisha)
- Dice (ダイス) (2003, serialized in Ribon, Shueisha)
- Otogibanashi wo Anata ni: Tsukiyo no Maihime (お伽話をあなたに月夜の舞姫) (2006, Shueisha)
