= Baby Love (manga) =

Manga and direct-to-video anime

- Cover of volume 9

ベイビィ★LOVE
- Genre: Romance
- Manga
- Written by: Ayumi Shiina
- Published by: Shueisha
- English publisher: Shueisha (digital)
- Magazine: Ribon
- Original run: September 1995 – May 1999
- Volumes: 9
- Original video animation
- Directed by: Susumu Kudo
- Produced by: Tsuushinsha Asahi; Youko Matsushita
- Written by: Tomoko Konparu
- Studio: Studio Comet
- Released: 1997
- Runtime: 30 minutes

Baby Love (ベイビィ★LOVE) is a shojo manga series by Ayumi Shiina. Part of the story has been adapted into an OVA. In 2026, the series became licensed digitally in English on Shueisha's Manga Million platform.

== Story ==
Seara is a mature young girl that fell in love with Shuhei Seto when she was still very young. Telling him that she would be his bride when she grew up, Shuhei told her that if she grew up to be a beautiful young woman, that he would think about it. Four years later, Seara comes to live with Shuhei while her parents move to America. She grew up to be a beautiful young woman, just to be with Shuhei. She drank milk every day for the past four years and looks a lot more mature than any girls her age. She is also much bigger than them and prefers to be on her own. It is said that she's afraid of people, although it is not said so in the OVA.

== Characters ==
- Seara Arisugawa Voiced by: Hiroko Kasahara

A tall, beautiful sixth grader who fell in love with Shuhei Seto. She is a strong, athletic girl who touches people with her honest expressions of how she really feels. Seara once said that one of her mottos is "Whoever is nice to me, I'll be nice to. Whoever is mean to me, I'll fight back!" She decided to stay with the Seto family while her mother and father moved to America so she could get closer to Shuhei.
At Seara's previous elementary school, anyone who was nice to her seemed to get hurt, so she was known as the "God of Plagues" and didn't have many friends. In her new elementary school, however, things seem to be going well and she is the most popular girl in the class. She is constantly trying to improve herself for Shuhei's sake.

- Shuhei Seto Voiced by: Tatsuya Okada

A tall, popular basketball player who is three years older than Seara. He has rejected Seara three times and made her cry on several occasions. He was in love with Ayano Nishina, but stepped aside for his friend Ko Segami.
Seara and Shuhei began a trial dating period after much denial from Shuhei and much effort from Seara. Unfortunately, things went downhill after Ko and Ayano broke up, and Seara was again rejected. Now Shuhei is very confused as to who is most important to him, Ayano or Seara.

- Koharu Seto Voiced by: Junko Takeuchi

Shuhei's sister and Seara's classmate/roommate, Koharu is a stubborn and easily embarrassed sixth grader. She is not very athletic nor tall and is a bit of a tomboy. She and Wataru Nikaidou had both liked each other but did nothing about it until Seara pushed them along.
Although Koharu initially was unhappy about sharing a room with Seara, they are now very good friends. Koharu can be a bit difficult but she is ultimately a caring person, as Seara puts it in volume 1, "a tender-hearted, good-natured person with the word 'idiot' on top."

- Rai

A tall, athletic basketball player who is best friends and the same age as Shuhei. The two are unstoppable when they team up because they have been playing together for so long and can predict the other's actions.
Rai fell in love with Seara at first sight and cares about her very much but was crushed to find that she was in love with Shuhei. Unlike Shuhei, Rai was not bothered by Seara's age difference. Overall, he is an honest, goofy guy who is caring and good-natured.

- Wataru Nikaidou

A basketball playing sixth grader. He is dating Koharu and looks up to Shuhei for his basketball skills.
Through a series of complicated events, Wataru was led to believe that Seara had been in love with him but let him go to Koharu so he could be happy with the one he truly liked (in reality, the only person Seara was ever interested in was Shuhei. She said this to draw attention to herself so people would stop making fun of Koharu). Wataru tells Shuhei this false information which causes Shuhei to believe that whenever Seara sees Wataru and Koharu together, she is secretly in pain and he sympathizes for her.

- Ayano Nishina

Seara's biggest rival for Shuhei, Ayano is the beautiful, large chested girl who Shuhei previously fell for. Her classmates consider her a smart beauty with a good personality, but is surprisingly unathletic.
She confessed to Shuhei but was rejected due to certain circumstances. She began dating Ko Segami in an effort to forget Shuhei, but she never did.

- Ko Segami

A friend of Shuhei and the boyfriend of Ayano.
He was aware of Shuhei and Ayano's feelings for each other, however he asked Shuhei to help him be with Ayano anyway to prevent the two from dating. When Ayano confessed to Shuhei, Shuhei rejected her remembering his promise to Ko. Ko then comforted Ayano and confessed, and they began dating.
Although he may seem a bit sneaky, he honestly loves Ayano and justified that if Shuhei truly loved Ayano he would not step aside for anyone.

== Volumes ==
1. ISBN 4-08-853851-X published in April 1996
2. ISBN 4-08-853877-3 published in September 1996
3. ISBN 4-08-856011-6 published in April 1997
4. ISBN 4-08-856037-X published in September 1997
5. ISBN 4-08-856063-9 published in February 1998
6. ISBN 4-08-856078-7 published in May 1998
7. ISBN 4-08-856109-0 published in November 1998
8. ISBN 4-08-856137-6 published in April 1999
9. ISBN 4-08-856153-8 published in July 1999
