= Nana Haruta =

Japanese manga artist

Nana Haruta 春田 なな
- Born: June 30, 1985 (age 41) Jōetsu, Niigata, Japan
- Notable works: Stardust Wink; Tsubasa to Hotaru

Nana Haruta (春田 なな, Haruta Nana; born June 30, 1985), is a Japanese manga artist. At the age of 15, she debuted with the short comic Ai no Ai Shirushi in 2000 and has been since known for her works Stardust Wink and Tsubasa to Hotaru.

== Career ==
Haruta's first story, Ai no Ai Shirushi, was published in the December 2000 issue of Ribon Original when she was 15 years old, making her one of the youngest to debut professionally as a manga artist.

== Works ==
=== Series ===
Year	Title	Magazine	Notes
2002	Samurai Darling (侍ダーリン)	Ribon	
2003	Itoshi no Goshujin-sama (いとしのご主人サマ)	Ribon	—
2004	Cactus's Secret; Saboten no Himitsu (サボテンの秘密)	Ribon	
2005	Love-Berrish! Rabu Berisshu! (ラブ・ベリッシュ！)	Ribon	
2007	Chocolate Cosmos; Chokorēto Kosumosu (チョコレートコスモス)	Ribon	
2009	Stardust Wink; Sutādasuto Uinku (スターダスト★ウインク)	Ribon	
2013	Tsubasa to Hotaru (つばさとホタル)	Ribon	
2018	Love Letters Written in June; Roku-gatsu no Rabu Retā (6月のラブレター)	Ribon	

=== Short stories ===
==== Anthologies ====
No.	Title	Japanese release date	Japanese ISBN
1	Tīnzu Burūzu (ティーンズブルース)	August 26, 2002	978-4088563978
1. Teens Blues (ティーンズブルース); 2. Sorairo No. Ao (空色NO.青); 3. Gokigen Daze! (ゴキゲンだぜ!); 4. Sora ni Saku Hana (空に咲く花); 5. Ai no Ai Shirushi (愛の♥愛のしるし)
The anthology features all of Haruta's short stories from 2000 to 2002.: Teens Blues was serialized in the February 2002 issue of Ribon Original.; Sorairo No. Ao was serialized in the June 2002 Ribon Original.; Gokigen Daze! was serialized in the 2001 Fall Chō Bikkuri Daizōkan edition of Ribon.; Sora ni Saku Hana was serialized in the June 2001 issue of Ribon Original.; Ai no Ai Shirushi was serialized in the December 2000 issue of Ribon Original.

==== Non-anthology stories ====
Year	Title	Magazine	Notes
2002	Shōmei Shōjo (透明少女)	Ribon Original	Serialized in the August 2002 issue; published in Samurai Darling
2003	Pekepeke na Otoshigoro (××なお年頃)	Ribon Original	Serialized in the April 2003 issue; published in Samurai Darling
2005	The Sweetness After; Sono Saki no Suīto (その先のスイート)	Ribon	Serialized in the February 2005 issue; published in volume 3 of Cactus's Secret
2005	Your Kid, the Brat; Okosama Buratto (お子様ブラット)	Ribon	Serialized in the July 2005 issue; published in volume 4 of Cactus's Secret
2006	Ōjisama no Tamago (王子サマのたまご)	Ribon	Serialized in the 2006 Spring Challenge! Daizōkan edition; published in volume 2 of Love-Berrish!
2007	Christmas ni Tenshi (クリスマスに天使)	Ribon	Serialized in the 2007 New Years Chō Bikkuri Daizōkan edition; published in volume 4 of Love-Berrish!
2008	Yes or Kiss; Iesu Oa Kisu (イエス オア キス)	Ribon Special	Serialized in the 2008 Spring Daizōkan edition; published in volume 2 of Chocolate Cosmos

=== Illustration credits ===
Year	Title	Notes
2010	Chinami ni Tribute	Illustration; as contributing artist
