= Cactus's Secret =

Manga series by Nana Haruta

- Cover of the first manga volume

サボテンの秘密 (Saboten no Himitsu)
- Genre: Comedy, romance
- Manga
- Written by: Nana Haruta
- Published by: Shueisha
- English publisher: NA: Viz Media
- Imprint: Ribon Mascot Comics
- Magazine: Ribon
- Original run: December 29, 2003 – April 30, 2005
- Volumes: 4

Cactus's Secret (サボテンの秘密, Saboten no Himitsu) is a Japanese shōjo manga series written and illustrated by Nana Haruta. The series began serialization in Ribon magazine on December 29, 2003, and ended its run on April 30, 2005. The individual chapters were collected into four tankōbon volumes by Shueisha; the first on August 11, 2004, and the final on October 14, 2005. The series has been licensed by Viz Media for an English-language North American release as part of their Shojo Beat imprint.

== Plot ==
Miku Yamada has liked Kyohei Fujioka since middle school, but once she gets the courage to confess, he thinks it's all a joke. To make things worse, when she gets upset, he calls her a "cactus alien" for being so prickly whenever he's around.

== Characters ==
Miku Yamada (山田 未来, Yamada Miku)
Voiced by: Ayako Kawasumi (drama CD)
Average high school student. She was quiet in middle school, but tried to change herself in high school to impress Fujioka, whom she has had a crush on since an encounter in middle school. She is very intelligent, being the top 23 students in her school and despite Fujioka's clueless nature and initial rejection of her feelings, she continues to pursue him and eventually becomes his girlfriend.
Kyohei Fujioka (藤岡 京平, Fujioka Kyōhei)
Voiced by: Hiroki Takahashi (drama CD)
He is a former delinquent. He dyed his hair back to black for high school. He is incredibly dense. Upon hearing Miku's confession, he rejects her feelings, saying he only sees her as a friend. However, he begins to reciprocate her feelings and confesses to her in chapter 12.

== Media ==
=== Manga ===
Written and drawn by Nana Haruta, the Cactus's Secret manga began serialization in Shueisha's shōjo manga magazine Ribon on December 29, 2003, in the January 2004 issue of the magazine. The series ended on April 30, 2005, in the May 2005 issue of the same magazine. At their panel at Anime Expo 2009, Viz Media announced they had licensed the series for North America as part of their Shojo Beat imprint.

==== Volume list ====
No.	Original release date	Original ISBN	English release date	English ISBN
01	August 11, 2004	4-08-856557-6	March 2, 2010	1-4215-3189-5
02	January 14, 2005	4-08-856582-7	June 1, 2010	1-4215-3190-9
03	June 15, 2005	4-08-856616-5	September 2010	1-4215-3191-7
04	October 14, 2005	4-08-856644-0	December 2010	1-4215-3192-5

=== Drama CD ===
A drama CD adaptation of the first chapter was released as a mail-in gift in the December 2004 issue of Ribon, along with The Gentlemen's Alliance Cross.

== Reception ==
Deb Aoki of About.com says of the first volume that while it has a basic premise, she was "charmed" by it. She also seems to enjoy Miku's characterization, saying "Miku is a likable gal simply because she's determined to get her guy to see things her way, no matter how discouraged she gets. Sure, she cries and gets angry, but she never wallows in self-pity for long. Miku's got too much pride and self-respect for that. That's a good thing, because shojo manga really doesn't need any more whiny doormat heroines."
