= Rockin' Heaven =

Japanese manga series

- Cover of the Japanese version of vol. 1, first released on June 15, 2006

ロッキン★ヘブン (Rokkin Hebun)
- Genre: Romantic comedy
- Manga
- Written by: Mayu Sakai
- Published by: Shueisha
- English publisher: Shueisha (digital)
- Imprint: Ribon Mascot Comics
- Magazine: Ribon
- Original run: December 2005 – July 2008
- Volumes: 8

Rockin' Heaven (ロッキン★ヘブン, Rokkin Hebun) is a Japanese manga series written and illustrated by Mayu Sakai. It premiered in Ribon's December 2005 issue where it ran until its conclusion in the July 2008 issue. The individual chapters were collected and published in eight tankōbon volumes by Shueisha between June 2006 and November 2008. The story focuses on high school freshman Sawa Konishi, who transfers to a new co-ed school where she is bullied by the other students and teachers, but also meets and falls in love with Ran Matsuyuki.

Shueisha produced a short series of web-based "vomics", a voice-over played with still manga panels.

== Plot ==
First year high school girl Sawa Konishi transfers to Amabane High School, a former all-boys school who has begun accepting female students. Throughout the day, Sawa learns that most of the boys in the school do not listen to the teachers, following the lead of Ran Matsuyuki, the son of the school's chairman. After confronting Ran, Sawa is bullied by the boys, but her unwavering courage and defiance causes her to gain respect from Ran and the rest of the boys, and they eventually become friends.

== Characters ==
Sawa Konishi (小西纱和, Konishi Sawa)
Voiced by: Noriko Shitaya (vomic)
Sawa is a friendly and outspoken 15-year-old girl who transfers to Amabane High School. As she gets to know Ran, they become close, eventually falling in love with each other and becoming a couple. Halfway through, she and Ran decide to break up and briefly dates Sugishita. At the end of the series, she gets back together with Ran and promise to work through their problems together. Years later, she and Ran marry and have a son named Aoi..
Ran Matsuyuki (松雪藍, Matsuyuki Ran)
Voiced by: Takahiro Sakurai (vomic)
Ran is the son of the chairman of the school and a leader among his friends in class. His mother initially helped him cope with his father's high expectations, but after her death, he attempted suicide. As a result, his friends regularly watch over him. Initially rude to Sawa, he grows to care for her romantically, but his indifference towards their relationship causes them to break up for some time. At the end of the series, they get back together and marry. Together, they have a son named Aoi and he also becomes a teacher at their high school.
Akira Nagashima (永島晶, Nagashima Akira)
Voiced by: Mamiko Noto (vomic)
Akira is Sawa's first friend at Amabane who is also her informant about the boys' history. She aspires to be a manga artist and was teased for that in middle school, but she learns to accept friendship and support from Sawa. Akira falls in love with Tsubaki, and he initially rejects her until graduation day. In the end, Akira and Tsubaki are engaged.
Junichi Tsubaki (椿純一, Tsubaki Junichi)
Voiced by: Kazuya Kobayashi (vomic)
Tsubaki is one of Sawa's classmates and Ran's best friend since childhood. He was in the basketball club with Ran and Kido until the third quarter of their second year of middle school. Tsubaki is considerate of everyone's feelings, especially Ran, who he is in love with. At the end of the series, he realizes he loves Akira after seeing how she much she cares for him. Years later, they become engaged.
Satoshi Kido (城户智史, Kido Satoshi)
Voiced by: Tetsuya Kakihara (vomic)
Kido is a classmate of Sawa and a friend of Ran. In middle school, he was part of the basketball club with Tsubaki and Ran. As the series progresses, he develops feelings for Sawa, initially unaware that she is dating Ran. He has a strong dislike for Sugishita, but he is willing to put his feelings behind him and helps to keep Sugishita from getting expelled.
Tomoki Ogawa (小川朋樹, Ogawa Tomoki)
Voiced by: Taketoshi Kawano (vomic)
Ogawa is another friend and classmate of Sawa and Ran's. A former member in the soccer club along with Taguchi, he is easygoing and helps his friends with any small tasks they may have. His family owns a beauty parlor, so his hair is always well done. After Sugishita comes, he realizes his dream is to work as a hairstylist in the entertainment industry, and he plans to study abroad after graduation.
Souta Taguchi (田口草太, Taguchi Sōta)
Voiced by: Hideki Nakanishi (vomic)
Taguchi another friend of Ran's. He was in the soccer club with Ogawa until the third quarter of their second year. He later falls in love with Akira because of their similar personalities, and they remain friends after she rejects him.
Yuri Shirakawa (白河結李, Shirakawa Yuri)
Yuri is Ran's beautiful ex-girlfriend who attends the all-girls school Eika Academy. Popular with boys, she is the one who initially asked Ran out, but she later broke up with him because he seemed indifferent about their relationship. Eventually she asks him to date her again, but he rejects her because he already loves Sawa. Yuri is saddened by this, but she later becomes friends with Sawa.
Haruki Sugishita (杉下 晴希, Sugishita Haruki)
Sugishita is a model and actor who enrolls at Amabane in their second year. Sawa begins dating him after she breaks up with Ran, causing Ran's friends to dislike him, but when he is at risk of being expelled, they defend him. After seeing Sawa is still in love with Ran, he breaks up with her to allow her the chance to pursue him again.

== Media ==
Written and illustrated by Mayu Sakai, Rockin Heaven premiered in the December 2005 issue of Ribon where it ran until its conclusion in the July 2008 issue. The individual chapters were collected and published in eight tankōbon volumes by Shueisha. The first was released on June 15, 2006; the final volume was published on November 14, 2008. In 2026, the manga became licensed digitally in English on Shueisha's Manga Million platform.

Shueisha produced a short series of web-based "vomics", a voice-over played with still panels from the manga. Rockin' Heaven is licensed for regional language releases in Germany by Tokopop Germany and in Italy, France and Spain by Planet Manga.

On November 16, 2010, Tokyopop Germany published an art book titled Mayu Sakai Collection: Rockin' Heaven & More, which also included art work from her succeeding series, Momo. The art book was also sold in Japan.

=== Volume List ===
No.	Japanese release date	Japanese ISBN
01	June 15, 2006	4-08-856687-4
02	October 13, 2006	4-08-856709-9
03	February 15, 2007	978-4-08-856726-6
04	June 15, 2007	978-4-08-856747-1
05	October 15, 2007	978-4-08-856776-1
06	February 15, 2008	978-4-08-856799-0
07	June 13, 2008	978-4-08-856819-5
08	November 14, 2008	978-4-08-856850-8

== Reception ==
Volume 8 debuted at #12 on Oricon and sold 34,661 copies on its first week of release.
