= Stardust Wink =

Shōjo manga series

- Cover of the Japanese version of vol. 1, first released on June 15, 2009

スターダスト★ウインク (Sutādasuto Uinku)
- Genre: Romantic comedy
- Manga
- Written by: Nana Haruta
- Published by: Shueisha
- English publisher: Shueisha (digital)
- Imprint: Ribon Mascot Comics
- Magazine: Ribon
- Original run: December 29, 2008 – December 28, 2012
- Volumes: 11

Stardust Wink (Japanese: スターダスト★ウインク, Hepburn: Sutādasuto Uinku) is a Japanese manga series by Nana Haruta. Stardust Wink was serialized in the monthly shōjo manga magazine Ribon from the February 2009 issue to the February 2013 issue.

== Plot ==
Anna Koshiro is childhood friends with Sou Nagase and Hinata Tokura, the most popular boys in school, and because of this, everyone assumes that she will date either of them eventually. Anna, however, wants to keep their relationship platonic, but the friendship between the three changes when Sou admits that he has always been in love with her, while she comes to terms with her being in love with Hinata.

== Characters ==
=== Main characters ===
Anna Koshiro (古城 杏菜, Koshiro Anna)
Voiced by: Mariya Ise (vomic)
Anna is a middle school student who lives in room 302.
Sou Nagase (永瀬 颯, Nagase Sō)
Voiced by: Shinnosuke Tachibana (vomic)
Sou is Anna's childhood friend who lives in room 301. He is one of the most popular boys in their school and does well in academics and sports. He has been in love with Anna since they were children.
Hinata Tokura (都倉 日向, Tokura Hinata)
Voiced by: Daisuke Namikawa (vomic)
Hinata is Anna's childhood friend who lives in room 303. He is one of the most popular boys in their school and is part of the Art Club.

=== Apartment residents ===
Beni Ichihara (市原 紅, Ichihara Beni)
Voiced by: uncredited (vomic)
Beni is a 6th grade student who is often mistaken for being older. She lives in room 501 and has a crush on Sou.
Mashiro Ichihara (市原 真白, Ichihara Mashiro)
Mashiro is a college student and Beni's older brother. He acts as a confidant to Anna.
Rin Nagase (永瀬 凛, Nagase Rin)
Rin is a college student and Sou's older sister.

=== Middle school classmates ===
Hime Suzui (古城 杏菜, Suzui Hime)
Voiced by: Rei Mochizuki (vomic)
Hime is Anna's friend at school.
Rui Arisaka (有坂 瑠衣, Arisaka Rui)
Voiced by: Kei Shindo (vomic)
Rui is Anna's friend at school.
Enomoto (榎本先輩, Enomoto-senpai)
Voiced by: Taishi Murata (vomic)
Enomoto is a third-year student who Anna initially dates before realizing she isn't in love with him.
Kurumi Mochizuki (望月 くるみ, Mochizuki Kurumi)
Mochizuki is Anna's shy classmate and part of the Art Club. She is in love with Hinata.
Mari Kobayashi (小林 マリ, Kobayashi Mari)
Miss Kobayashi is the club advisor for the Art Club, who Anna discovers is misplacing her feelings on Hinata after being rejected by her ex-fiancé.

=== High school classmates ===
Nanoka Saeki (佐伯 菜花, Saeki Nanoka)
Nanoka is Anna's classmate and friend in high school. She holds a grudge against Sou for dating Ayane in middle school.
Ayane Aso (麻生 絢音, Asō Ayane)
Ayane is Nanoka's beautiful childhood friend who dated Sou in middle school.
Hinata Kazami (風見 陽多, Kazami Hinata)
Kazami is Anna's classmate in high school who sits behind her. He is always sleeping because he works as a manga artist. He has been friends with Nanoka and Ayane since childhood.

== Media ==
=== Manga ===
Stardust Wink is written and illustrated by Nana Haruta. It was serialized in the monthly shōjo manga magazine Ribon from the February 2009 issue released on December 29, 2008, to the February 2013 issue released on December 28, 2012. The chapters were later released in 11 bound volumes by Shueisha under the Ribon Mascot Comics imprint. The first-press edition of each book came with a character file bookmark.

In 2010, Haruta published a spin-off side story in Margaret, which was later compiled in volume 6. After the series' run, Haruta published another spin-off side story titled Sekai de Ichiban Semai Hoshi (世界で1番せまい星) in the 2013 Winter Daizōkan edition of Ribon Special, which focused on Mashiro and Rin, and was later published in volume 1 of Tsubasa to Hotaru.

In 2026, the series became licensed digitally in English on Shueisha's Manga Million platform.

No.	Japanese release date	Japanese ISBN
1	June 15, 2009	978-4-08-856893-5
2	November 13, 2009	978-4-08-867022-5
3	April 15, 2010	978-4-08-867048-5
4	September 15, 2010	978-4-08-867074-4
5	January 14, 2011	978-4-08-867092-8
6	May 13, 2011	978-4-08-867120-8
7	October 14, 2011	978-4-08-867147-5
8	March 15, 2012	978-4-08-867184-0
9	August 10, 2012	978-4-08-867215-1
10	February 15, 2013	978-4-08-867251-9
11	May 15, 2013	978-4-08-867268-7

=== Audio drama ===
During the series' run, a vomic (voice comic) was released on Shueisha's website on May 13, 2011, which adapted the first chapter. The vomic was also later released as a magazine gift on DVD with the June 2012 issue of Ribon on May 1, 2012.

== Reception ==
Volume 3 debuted at #20 on Oricon and sold 32,848 copies in its first week. Volume 4 debuted at #23 on Oricon and sold 35,637 copies in its first week. Volume 5 debuted at #9 on Oricon and sold 29,919 copies in its first week. Volume 6 debuted at #13 on Oricon and sold 29,414 copies in its first week and 56,212 copies overall. Volume 7 debuted at #11 on Oricon and sold 29,580 copies in its first week. Volume 8 debuted at #16 on Oricon and sold 42,534 copies in its first week. Volume 9 debuted at #24 on Oricon and 30,549 copies in its first week. Volume 10 debuted at #24 on Oricon and sold 27,122 copies in its first week and 56,643 copies overall. Volume 11 debuted at #29 on Oricon and sold 43,226 copies in its first week.
