= Chocolate Cosmos =

Manga

- The cover of the second tankōbon volume of Chocolate Cosmos as published by Shueisha under their Ribon Mascot Comics imprint.

チョコレートコスモス
- Genre: Romantic comedy
- Manga
- Written by: Nana Haruta
- Published by: Shueisha
- English publisher: NA: Viz Media
- Imprint: Ribon Mascot Comics
- Magazine: Ribon
- Original run: August 3, 2007 – October 3, 2008
- Volumes: 4

Chocolate Cosmos (チョコレートコスモス, Chokorēto Kosumosu) is a Japanese shōjo manga series written and illustrated by Nana Haruta. The series was serialized in Ribon magazine from the September 2007 issue of the magazine until its final chapter in the November 2008 issue. The individual chapters were collected into four tankōbon volumes by publisher Shueisha; the first on December 14, 2007, and the final on November 14, 2008.

== Plot ==
Sayuki Sakurai is a fifteen-year-old girl who is determined to find love. On a trip to the beach she meets a handsome man who smells like chocolate and falls in love with him immediately. He tells her that he goes to her school and she is left puzzled as she has never seen him before. When she returns to school she has a surprise in the form of Hagiwara, her Home Economics teacher.

== Characters ==
Sayuki Sakurai (桜井 紗雪, Sakurai Sayuki)
Sayuki is a first-year at Shunei High School who hopes to find true love, but has a perpetual and innate grumpy look on her face, which causes people to mistake her as bully. She is romantic and has never had a boyfriend. She falls in love with her teacher, Hagiwara, without knowing his true identity. Although she claims to hate Yūshi, her actions prove otherwise. She always tries to impress her crush.
Katsuya Hagiwara (萩原 克弥, Hagiwara Katsuya)
Mr. Hagiwara is the Home Economics teacher beginning his first year teaching at Shunei, he is young and handsome. Because of this, a good deal of students are infatuated with him to various degrees. He is an advisor for the baseball/culinary club that Yūshi and Sayuki start. Though he was her teacher before then, he "meets" Sayuki at the beach during summer vacation, where he rescues her from a date. He never tells her his name, but says he goes to the same school as her. He is very kindhearted and outside of school is an average guy. He covertly looks after Sayuki.
Mina Nomura (野村 美奈, Nomura Mina)
Mina is Sayuki's outgoing friend who often tries to help her find a boyfriend.
Shiori Harada (原田 栞, Harada Shiori)
Shiori is another one of Sayuki's friends, who acts very mysterious and quiet. She is observant and reluctantly supports helping Sayuki through dangerous and occult methods.
Yūshi Mutō (武藤 悠士, Mutō Yūshi)
Yūshi is a boy in the same grade as Sayuki, and her life-long friend. He likes to read baseball manga, and tries to start a baseball club, which soon becomes a baseball/culinary Club. Yūshi has a crush on Sayuki and goes out of his way to impress her.
Takayuki Kaji (梶 高行, Kaji Takayuki)
Kaji is Yūshi's narcissistic best friend, handsome, and slightly air-headed. He tries to help Yūshi catch Sayuki's eye, and encourages the idea of a baseball club.

== Media ==
=== Manga ===
Chocolate Cosmos is written and illustrated by Nana Haruta. It was serialized in the monthly magazine Ribon from August 3, 2007, in the September issue to October 3, 2008, in the November issue. The chapters were later released in bound volumes by Shueisha for a total of 4 volumes under the Ribon Mascot Comics imprint. Viz Media licensed the manga in 2015 in English, with all four volumes published digitally under the Viz Select imprint.

| No. | Original release date | Original ISBN | English release date | English ISBN |
|---|---|---|---|---|
| 1 | December 14, 2007 | 978-4-08-856789-1 | July 18, 2015 | 978-1-4215-8681-6 |
| 2 | April 14, 2008 | 978-4-08-856807-2 | October 20, 2015 | 978-1-4215-8751-6 |
| 3 | August 12, 2008 | 978-4-08-856839-3 | November 17, 2015 | 978-1-4215-8681-6 |
| 4 | November 14, 2008 | 978-4-08-856851-5 | December 22, 2015 | 978-1-4215-8896-4 |

== Reception ==
The final volume of the series sold 31,326 copies in its first week, making it the 18th best-selling manga of the week.
