= Not Your Idol =

Japanese manga series

- Cover of the first volume

さよならミニスカート (Sayonara Mini Sukāto)
- Genre: Psychological thriller; Romantic drama
- Manga
- Written by: Aoi Makino
- Published by: Shueisha
- English publisher: NA: Viz Media
- Imprint: Ribon Mascot Comics
- Magazine: Ribon
- Original run: August 3, 2018 – present
- Volumes: 4

Not Your Idol (Japanese: さよならミニスカート, Hepburn: Sayonara Mini Sukāto; lit. 'Goodbye, Mini Skirt') is a Japanese manga series written and illustrated by Aoi Makino. It began serialization in Shueisha's Ribon magazine in August 2018. As of June 2025, four collected volumes have been released. It tells the story of Nina Kamiyama, a high school girl hiding her past as Karen Amamiya, a former idol who left her group after a violent attack, as she faces the threat of her assailant discovering her identity and striking again.

== Plot ==
Pure Club is an idol group with a global following. However, during a handshake event, Karen Amamiya is attacked by a hooded man, prompting her to leave the group and disappear from public view. In a separate storyline, Nina Kamiyama rejects traditional femininity, sporting short hair and a male school uniform. Following an assault on a nearby schoolgirl, the schools in the area cancel girls' after-school activities, urging them to walk home in groups. Despite these warnings, Kamiyama continues to walk alone until Hikaru Horiuchi, a boy in the judo club, discovers her secret: she was Karen, the former center of Pure Club. Unbeknownst to Kamiyama, her assailant also knows about her past and is waiting to strike again.

== Publication ==
Written and illustrated by Aoi Makino, the series began serialization in Shueisha's manga magazine Ribon on August 3, 2018. The series' chapters have been collected into four tankōbon volumes, the most recent volume being released in June 2025. In the August 2019 issue of Ribon, it was stated that because of Aoi Makino's poor health, the series would be taking a break. In 2024, it was announced that the series would be returning to serialization starting with the May 2024 issue of Ribon that was released on April 3, 2024.

At New York Comic Con 2019, Viz Media announced that they licensed the series for English publication.

=== Volumes ===
No.	Original release date	Original ISBN	English release date	English ISBN
1	November 22, 2018	978-4-08-867520-6	May 5, 2020	978-1-9747-1516-9
2	March 25, 2019	978-4-08-867543-5	September 1, 2020	978-1-9747-1517-6
3	September 25, 2024	978-4-08-867556-5	October 7, 2025	978-1-9747-5860-9
4	June 25, 2025	978-4-08-867791-0	July 7, 2026	978-1-9747-6293-4
5	November 25, 2026	978-4-08-867850-4	—	—

== Reception ==
=== Critical response ===
Brittany Vincent of Otaku USA praised the use of gender and social expectations in the story. She also praised the depiction of idol culture in the series and the psychological thriller elements, which she compared to Perfect Blue, Oshi no Ko and Rin Usami's novel Idol, Burning. Morgana Santilli of Comics Beat felt the artwork and storytelling were typical of shōjo manga, though Santilli nonetheless praised the use of femininity in the story. Lauren Orsini of Forbes compared the story to the 2014 AKB48 handsaw assault and the 2016 Stabbing of Mayu Tomita. She also praised the use of shōjo manga tropes in the story's exploration of femininity.

=== Accolades ===
Year	Award	Category	Result	Ref.
2019	23rd Tezuka Osamu Cultural Prize	Best Manga	Nominated	
2019	2019 Tsutaya Comic Award	Best Manga	10th place	
2019	Da Vinci 19th Annual Book of the Year	Book of the Year	41st place	
2019	2020 Kono Manga ga Sugoi! guidebook	Best Manga for Female Readers	Won	
