= Onna no Ko tte =

Manga and television anime

- Onna no Ko tte manga volume 1 cover

女の子って。
- Genre: Comedy, Educational
- Manga
- Written by: Kanahei
- Published by: Shueisha
- Imprint: Ribon Mascot Comics
- Magazine: Ribon
- Original run: October 2011 – present
- Volumes: 4
- Anime television series
- Original run: February 5, 2015 – February 26, 2015
- Episodes: 4

Onna no Ko tte (女の子って。) is a Japanese manga written and illustrated by Kanahei. It began serialization in Shueisha's Ribon magazine with the October 2011 issue. A series of anime shorts based on the manga premiered in February 2015 which ran for four episodes.

== Media ==
=== Manga ===
Onna no Ko tte is written and illustrated by Kanahei. It began serialization in Shueisha's Ribon magazine with the October 2011 issue. The first tankōbon volume was released on March 15, 2013; the fourth volume was published on June 24, 2016.

=== Anime ===
An anime television series adaptation premiered in February 2015. The anime consists of four shorts that aired on the children's variety program Oha Suta. The anime was animated in Adobe Flash.
