= ChocoTan! =

Manga and anime

- Chocotan!

チョコタン ！ (Chokotan)
- Genre: Romance
- Manga
- Written by: Kozue Takeuchi
- Published by: Shueisha
- Magazine: Ribon
- Original run: October 3, 2011 – September 1, 2017
- Volumes: 13
- Anime film
- Music by: Asuka Sakai
- Studio: J.C.Staff
- Released: March 17, 2013
- Runtime: 10 minutes
- icon

Chocotan! (チョコタン ！, Chokotan) is a Japanese manga written and illustrated by Kozue Takeuchi. It was serialized in Shueisha's shōjo manga magazine Ribon from October 2011 to September 2017. An anime special produced by J.C.Staff was shown at Ribon Festa in 2013.

== Plot ==
Chocotan is about a puppy named Chocotan and her owner. Chocotan is able to talk to her owner due to her eating a plant that gave her the ability to speak. Nao, her owner, has a crush on someone that she goes and sees every day at the park to walk their dogs.

== Characters ==
Chocotan
Voiced by: Rie Kugimiya
Nao Hatori
Voiced by: Ayane Sakura

== Media ==
=== Manga ===
Written and illustrated by Kozue Takeuchi, Chocotan was serialized in Shueisha's shōjo manga magazine Ribon from October 3, 2011, to September 1, 2017. The series' chapters were collected into thirteen tankōbon volumes from April 13, 2012, to March 23, 2018.

No.	Release date	ISBN
1	April 13, 2012	978-4-08-867195-6
2	September 14, 2012	978-4-08-867223-6
3	January 15, 2013	978-4-08-867247-2
4	April 15, 2013	978-4-08-867263-2
5	August 9, 2013	978-4-08-867281-6
6	January 15, 2014	978-4-08-867306-6
7	June 13, 2014	978-4-08-867327-1
8	December 15, 2014	978-4-08-867348-6
9	May 25, 2015	978-4-08-867371-4
10	November 25, 2015	978-4-08-867394-3
11	August 25, 2016	978-4-08-867425-4
12	May 25, 2017	978-4-08-867463-6
13	March 23, 2018	978-4-08-867494-0

=== Anime ===
An anime special produced by J.C.Staff was shown at Ribon Festa in March 2013.
