= In the Name of the Mermaid Princess =

Japanese manga series

- First tankōbon volume cover

ミオの名のもとに (Mio no Na no Moto ni)
- Genre: Fantasy; Romance
- Manga
- Written by: Yoshino Fumikawa
- Illustrated by: Miya Tashiro
- Published by: Shueisha
- English publisher: NA: Viz Media
- Imprint: Ribon Mascot Comics
- Magazine: Ribon
- Original run: December 1, 2020 – March 16, 2023
- Volumes: 7
- icon

In the Name of the Mermaid Princess (Japanese: ミオの名のもとに, Hepburn: Mio no Na no Moto ni) is a Japanese manga series written by Yoshino Fumikawa and illustrated by Miya Tashiro. It was serialized in Shueisha's shōjo manga magazine Ribon from December 2020 to March 2023, with its chapters collected in seven tankōbon volumes.

== Plot ==
In a world where humans can give birth to "unhumans" such as fairies and angels, unhumans are discriminated against in many countries. Because Princess Mio of the kingdom of Blognig is a mermaid, her father has kept her unhuman status a secret and tried to turn her into a human before her sixteenth birthday, in preparation for her marriage to Prince Chika from the kingdom of Aquatia. When Mio is introduced to Yuri, her tutor for Aquatian customs, he inspires her to embrace her mermaid identity and advocate for other unhumans, but the two of them are forced to run away together to escape punishment from Mio's father.

== Publication ==
Written by Yoshino Fumikawa and illustrated by Miya Tashiro, In the Name of the Mermaid Princess was serialized in Shueisha's shōjo manga magazine Ribon from December 1, 2020, to March 16, 2023 (finished in the magazine's Spring 2023 extra issue). Shueisha collected its chapters in seven tankōbon volumes, released from June 24, 2021, to March 24, 2023.

The manga is licensed for English release in North America by Viz Media.

=== Volumes ===
| No. | Original release date | Original ISBN | English release date | English ISBN |
|---|---|---|---|---|
| 1 | June 24, 2021 | 978-4-08-867622-7 | February 6, 2024 | 978-1-9747-4273-8 |
| 2 | July 21, 2021 | 978-4-08-867625-8 | May 7, 2024 | 978-1-9747-4560-9 |
| 3 | November 25, 2021 | 978-4-08-867642-5 | August 6, 2024 | 978-1-9747-4628-6 |
| 4 | March 25, 2022 | 978-4-08-867654-8 | November 5, 2024 | 978-1-9747-4929-4 |
| 5 | July 25, 2022 | 978-4-08-867673-9 | February 4, 2025 | 978-1-9747-5186-0 |
| 6 | November 25, 2022 | 978-4-08-867688-3 | May 6, 2025 | 978-1-9747-5484-7 |
| 7 | March 24, 2023 | 978-4-08-867710-1 | August 5, 2025 | 978-1-9747-5561-5 |

== Reception ==
Rebecca Silverman of Anime News Network gave the first volume a B+ grade. She described it as an effective, though occasionally preachy, fantasy parallel to real-world racism and ableism. Silverman noted that Mio's internalized marginalization and her tutor Yuri's encouragement of self-acceptance had condescending undertones. Despite the clear messaging, Silverman found the volume engrossing, praising Mio's growth, the nuanced supporting characters, and the fairy-tale quality of the artwork. Sheena McNeil of Sequential Tart gave the first volume a grade of 5 out of 10. She considered it to be an installment heavy on setup that did not offer anything new in terms of its story. She noted the story's treatment of discrimination and parental abuse from Princess Mio's sheltered perspective. However, she found Mio to be insufficiently compelling to continue reading, citing her limited agency and the constraints of her aquatic existence. Danica Davidson of Otaku USA described the first volume of the series as a gentle and charming fable about prejudice with a simple plot that establishes the setting and themes. She also praised the artwork for complementing the mermaid fantasy theme, ultimately calling it an "attractive and gentle manga".
