= Tsubasa to Hotaru =

Japanese manga series

- Cover of the Japanese version of vol. 1, first released on February 14, 2014

つばさとホタル (Tsubasa to Hotaru)
- Genre: Romantic comedy
- Manga
- Written by: Nana Haruta
- Published by: Shueisha
- Imprint: Ribon Mascot Comics
- Magazine: Ribon
- Original run: August 3, 2013 – November 2, 2017
- Volumes: 11
- Original video animation
- Directed by: Chiaki Kon
- Produced by: Yūji Matsukura
- Written by: Chiaki Kon
- Music by: Meg.me
- Studio: J.C.Staff
- Released: March 16, 2014
- Runtime: 15 mins.
- Anime television series
- Directed by: Chiaki Kon
- Written by: Chiaki Kon
- Music by: Meg.me
- Studio: J.C.Staff
- Original network: TV Tokyo
- Original run: March 6, 2015 – May 24, 2016
- Episodes: 7

Tsubasa to Hotaru (Japanese: つばさとホタル; lit. "Tsubasa and Fireflies") is a Japanese manga series written and illustrated by Nana Haruta. Tsubasa to Hotaru was serialized in the monthly shōjo manga magazine Ribon from the September 2013 issue to the December 2017 issue. During the series' run, an anime adaptation was screened at Ribon Festa 2014 and episodes were later produced as animated segments in the children's variety show Oha Suta.

== Plot ==
Tsubasa Sonokawa is a high school student who falls in love with an upperclassman after he helped her when she fainted from anemia at the train station. After getting rejected, Tsubasa decides to help Yuri with managing the boys' basketball team and becomes acquainted with Aki Hidaka, Yūma Toba, and Yoshinari Karasuma. As Tsubasa gets closer to Aki, she discovers that he was the one who saved her when she fainted, and she begins to fall in love with him.

== Characters ==
Tsubasa Sonokawa (園川 つばさ, Sonokawa Tsubasa)
Voiced by: Kanae Itō
Tsubasa is a bubbly high school student who wants to be seen as dependable by her peers. She becomes one of the managers of the basketball team.
Aki Hidaka (飛鷹 顕, Hidaka Aki)
Voiced by: Yoshitsugu Matsuoka
Aki is a member of the basketball team, and his classmates call him Akky (アッキー). He is quiet, but he has a strong appetite.
Yūma Toba (鳥羽 結真, Toba Yūma)
Voiced by: Takahiro Sakurai
Yūma is a member of the basketball team and one of the most popular boys in school, especially among the girls, who regard him as a gentleman. After noticing Tsubasa's hardworking nature, he eventually falls in love with her.
Yoshinari Karasuma (烏丸 吉成, Karasuma Yoshinari)
Voiced by: Jun Fukushima
Yoshinari is a member of the basketball team and Tsubasa's classmate. He is energetic, but he is also oblivious during serious situations.
Yuri Chōno (蝶野 友梨, Chōno Yuri)
Voiced by: Satomi Satō
Yuri is Tsubasa's childhood friend who is a year her senior. She is the manager of the basketball team.
Hachiya (蜂谷, Hachiya)
Voiced by: Hiro Shimono
Hachiya is a third-year student on the basketball team and Yuri's boyfriend.
Ran Mikazuki (三日月 蘭, Mikazuki Ran)
Ran is one of the most popular girls in Tsubasa's school and one of the winners of the school's pageant during the cultural festival. She is interested in Yūma.
Sugiyama (杉山先輩, Sugiyama-senpai)
Voiced by: Yoshimasa Hosoya
Sugiyama is an upperclassmen who Tsubasa falls in love with at first, believing him to be the one who saved her when she fainted. He rejects her for being overbearing.

== Media ==
=== Manga ===
Tsubasa to Hotaru is written and illustrated by Nana Haruta. It was serialized in the monthly magazine Ribon from the September 2013 issue released on August 3, 2013, to the December 2017 issue released on November 2, 2017. The chapters were later released in 11 bound volumes by Shueisha under the Ribon Mascot Comics imprint.

A side story of Haruta's previous work, Stardust Wink, was serialized in the 2013 Winter Daizōkan edition of Ribon Special and was later published in volume 1 of Tsubasa to Hotaru. An official fan book featuring Haruta's color artwork and character profiles, titled Towa High School Boys Basketball Team Fan Book, was released on August 3, 2016, with the September 2016 issue of Ribon.

No.	Japanese release date	Japanese ISBN
1	February 14, 2014	978-4-08-867309-7
2	April 15, 2014	978-4-08-867321-9
3	September 12, 2014	978-4-08-867340-0
4	March 13, 2015	978-4-08-867362-2
5	August 25, 2015	978-4-08-867386-8
6	December 25, 2015	978-4-08-867398-1
7	April 26, 2016	978-4-08-867411-7
8	September 23, 2016	978-4-08-867429-2
9	February 24, 2017	978-4-08-867448-3
10	July 25, 2017	978-4-08-867468-1
11	December 25, 2017	978-4-08-867481-0

=== Anime ===
An anime adaptation was first announced in the February 2014 issue of Ribon. The anime was written and directed by Chiaki Kon, with animation produced by J.C.Staff. The anime was screened at Ribon Festa 2014, which took place on March 16 in Miyagi Prefecture, March 21 in Hiroshima, March 29–30 in Kyoto, and April 5–6 in Yokohama. The ending theme song is "Tsubasa to Hotaru" and is performed by Kanae Itō, the voice actress of Tsubasa.

Several episodes were then created and aired as short animated segments on the children's variety show Oha Suta, which was broadcast on TV Tokyo. The first part aired in four weekly segments from March 6, 2015, to March 27, 2015. The second part aired in three weekly segments from May 10, 2016, to May 24, 2016.

No.	Title	Directed by	Written by	Original release date
Special	Transliteration: "Tsubasa to Hotaru" (Japanese: つばさとホタル)	Chiaki Kon	Chiaki Kon	March 16, 2014
Tsubasa Sonokawa is in love with Sugiyama, who she believes had helped her when she fainted at a train station, but he finds her overbearing and rejects her. Later, Tsubasa is recruited as a temporary manager of the boys' basketball team until Yuri's injury is healed. She becomes acquainted with Aki, Yūma, and Yoshinari, who accept her for who she is. After Tsubasa finds closure with Sugiyama, she is made a permanent manager and also discovers that Aki is the one who saved her when she fainted.
1	"Episode 1"; Transliteration: "Dai Ikkai" (Japanese: 第1回)	Chiaki Kon	Chiaki Kon	March 6, 2015
This episode is a recap episode of the special.
2	"Episode 2"; Transliteration: "Dai Ni-kai" (Japanese: 第2回)	Chiaki Kon	Chiaki Kon	March 13, 2015
As the basketball team prepares for a match, Yūma asks Tsubasa if she's in love with Aki, to which she realizes after cheering for him. She tells Yūma that she will prioritize her duties as the basketball team's manager in spite of this.
3	"Episode 3"; Transliteration: "Dai San-kai" (Japanese: 第3回)	Chiaki Kon	Chiaki Kon	March 20, 2015
The basketball team holds a training camp, and Tsubasa slowly learns more about Aki. At nighttime, the two, along with Yūma and Yoshinari, find fireflies at the river. Tsubasa discovers that much like the fireflies, Aki also "sparkles" to her in spite of his taciturn personality.
4	"Episode 4"; Transliteration: "Dai Yon-kai" (Japanese: 第1回)	Chiaki Kon	Chiaki Kon	March 27, 2015
During the cultural festival, Tsubasa is in charge of Yūma's endorsement speech for the school's pageant; however, his jealous fan girls confront her and rip up her draft, angering him. Tsubasa, on the other hand, already has the speech memorized and delivers it when Yūma is announced as the winner. During the victory questionnaire, Yūma announces to the school that he has someone he likes, subtly declaring Aki as his rival.
5	"Episode 5"; Transliteration: "Dai Go-kai" (Japanese: 第5回)	Chiaki Kon	Chiaki Kon	May 10, 2016
Tsubasa's class is planning a Christmas party, but Aki doesn't seem interested in attending. Tsubasa insists that the girls in the class are kind, and he reconsiders after she confirms she is going.
6	"Episode 6"; Transliteration: "Dai Roku-kai" (Japanese: 第6回)	Chiaki Kon	Chiaki Kon	May 17, 2016
Tsubasa discovers that Aki is unable to attend the party in the end due to basketball practice. Yūma consoles her, and when she thanks him for being a "hero", he confesses that he's in love with her.
7	"Episode 7"; Transliteration: "Dai Nana-kai" (Japanese: 第7回)	Chiaki Kon	Chiaki Kon	May 24, 2016
Yūma kisses Tsubasa in the gym storage room when she tends to his injury, which Aki witnesses. At the train station, Aki realizes his feelings for Tsubasa, while she avoids Yūma. When Yūma confronts Aki over seeing him kiss her, Aki admits that while he isn't sure if Tsubasa is still in love with him, he has fallen in love with her.

== Reception ==
Volume 2 debuted on Oricon at #27, with 31,895 copies sold in its first week. Volume 3 debuted on Oricon at #37, with 26,214 copies sold in its first week and 51,393 copies overall. Volume 4 debuted on Oricon at #22, with 32,446 copies sold in its first week and 61,195 copies overall. Volume 5 debuted on Oricon at #9, with 66,822 copies sold in its first week and 88,881 copies overall.
