= Ui × Kon =

Japanese manga series

- First tankōbon volume cover

初×婚
- Genre: Romance
- Manga
- Written by: Minori Kurosaki
- Published by: Shueisha
- Imprint: Ribon Mascot Comics
- Magazine: Ribon
- Original run: May 1, 2019 – February 3, 2025
- Volumes: 17
- icon

Ui × Kon (初×婚) is a Japanese manga series written and illustrated by Minori Kurosaki. It was serialized in Shueisha's shōjo manga magazine Ribon from May 2019 to February 2025, with its chapters collected in seventeen tankōbon volumes.

By June 2023, the manga had over 1.9 million copies in circulation. In 2023, it won the 68th Shogakukan Manga Award in the children's category.

== Plot ==
Ui, who recently lost both her parents in an accident, enrolls into a unique high school that pairs students together with the intention of future marriage. These student pairs share a dorm room for three years and compete in a variety of tasks and competitions to prove their love, with the aim of being chosen as the best couple in the school. Winning this competition will allow them to partake in a special wedding and take ownership of the academy, becoming rich in the process.

Ui enrolls in this school with the hopes of finding a new family; a person who will welcome her home and love her the way her parents did. However, she is paired with a clever, calculating student named Kon. Kon joined the school for one reason: money. He wants to be part of the best couple and take the big prize, even if he has to fake their relationship.

While Kon is very skilled and succeeds in many of the school's trials, Ui does not make it easy for him. She came to the school to find love, not to help someone lie their way to the top. Therefore, Ui and Kon seek to achieve their personal goals while navigating the unusual events and challenges of this distinctive school.

== Publication ==
Written and illustrated by Minori Kurosaki, Ui × Kon was serialized in Shueisha's shōjo manga magazine Ribon from May 1, 2019, to February 3, 2025. Shueisha collected its chapters in seventeen tankōbon volumes, released from September 25, 2019, to March 25, 2025.

=== Volumes ===
No.	Release date	ISBN
1	September 25, 2019	978-4-08-867566-4
2	January 24, 2020	978-4-08-867575-6
3	June 25, 2020	978-4-08-867588-6
4	September 25, 2020	978-4-08-867601-2
5	February 25, 2021	978-4-08-867607-4
6	May 25, 2021	978-4-08-867620-3
7	September 24, 2021	978-4-08-867637-1
8	January 25, 2022	978-4-08-867648-7
9	May 25, 2022	978-4-08-867660-9
10	September 22, 2022	978-4-08-867680-7
11	February 24, 2023	978-4-08-867705-7
12	June 23, 2023	978-4-08-867718-7
13	October 25, 2023	978-4-08-867733-0
14	February 22, 2024	978-4-08-867746-0
15	July 25, 2024	978-4-08-867765-1
16	November 25, 2024	978-4-08-867778-1
17	March 25, 2025	978-4-08-867793-4; 978-4-08-867799-6 (SE)

== Reception ==
By June 2023, the manga had over 1.9 million copies in circulation. In 2023, the manga won the 68th Shogakukan Manga Award in the children's category.
