= Peter Pan Syndrome (manga) =

Japanese manga series by Mayu Sakai

- Cover of the Japanese version of vol. 1, first released on August 12, 2005
- Genre: Fantasy, romance
- Manga
- Written by: Mayu Sakai
- Published by: Shueisha
- English publisher: SEA: M&C!
- Imprint: Ribon Mascot Comics
- Magazine: Ribon
- Original run: December 28, 2004 – September 3, 2005
- Volumes: 2
- icon

Peter Pan Syndrome (ピーターパン♠症候群, Pītā Pan Shindorōmu) is a Japanese manga series by Mayu Sakai. Peter Pan Syndrome was serialized in the monthly shōjo manga magazine Ribon from December 28, 2004, to September 3, 2005.

== Plot ==
Kohaku Hasumi, a first-year middle school student, has telekinesis that allows her to fly and levitate when there is no sunlight. Having moved to a new town to search for her mother, Kohaku is under the orders of her father, Rin, to keep her abilities a secret else her family will move to a different town. During one of her evening searches for her mother, she accidentally drops her cell phone on the balcony of the top floor of an apartment building, which is occupied by the family of twin brothers Yūro and Akari Tachibana. Upon her first day at her new school, Kohaku meets the twins and finds her cell phone with them. Despite clashing at first with Yūro, she uses her flight abilities to save him when he is accidentally pushed out of a window and falls. Developing an unlikely friendship, Yūro promises to keep Kohaku's abilities a secret and help her find her mother.

To search for Kohaku's mother, Yūro cooperates with her by using resources from the hospital that his family owns. As the two become closer, Kohaku learns more about his personal life and his mother's expectations for him to become the family hospital's next chairman, while Yūro slowly grows fond of her. Kohaku realizes she is in love with him, but he is dumbfounded by her sudden confession and rejects her. When Tōko Kagami, a girl from Kohaku's childhood who has strong telekinetic abilities, returns to her life and romantically pursues Yūro, Yūro realizes Kohaku is important to him.

Tōko warns Kohaku that her own abilities are fading and that people from the research facility they both grew up in are in town. Once Kohaku is discovered and targeted by the research facility, Rin reveals that, as a result of being able to fly, a side effect is that she will never be able to age. Yūro admits his feelings for Kohaku, but because she will never age, he is fearful about their future together. Wendy, Kohaku's cat, reveals that she is Kohaku's mother, who used her telekinesis to transfer her consciousness to a black cat when she was about to die from giving birth to her. Wendy gives Kohaku the choice between the options of fleeing from the research facility, staying with them, or sacrificing her abilities to live a normal life. Kohaku ultimately decides to leave with her family, while the research facility decides to let her be free. She and Yūro bid each other farewell and promise to meet again in the future.

Four years later, Yūro has become a high school student and has been taking his studies seriously in order to pursue medicine. Kohaku appears as a new student at his school and reunites with him, revealing that she not only has grown up, but she has also developed new telekinetic abilities.

== Characters ==
Kohaku Hasumi (蓮見 琥珀, Hasumi Kohaku)
Kohaku is a first-year middle school student and is 12 years old. She is clumsy, but she is also hot-blooded with a strong sense of justice. Sakai describes her as the "Peter Pan" of the story and chose the name "Kohaku" (meaning "amber") for her to make the character more "manga-like". Her birthday, December 27, falls on the same day as the first performance of the 1904 play Peter Pan.
Yūro Tachibana (橘 夕露, Tachibana Yūro)
Yūro is Kohaku's classmate. He is described as "mature" and "cheeky". He is popular in school for his handsome appearance and grades. His family owns a hospital, and he is pressured by his mother to study and become its next chairman. He is level-headed and the only person outside of Kohaku's family to know that she can fly.
Akari Tachibana (橘 暁里, Tachibana Akari)
Akari is Yūro's twin brother. Unlike Yūro, Akari is cheerful, sociable, and simple-minded. He is unaware that Kohaku can fly, but he also participates in helping to look for her mother.
Tōko Kagami (鏡 透子, Kagami Tōko)
Tōko is a beautiful girl who grew up in the same research facility as Kohaku. Compared to Kohaku, her telekinetic abilities are stronger; however, they are secretly fading because she is growing up. Tōko is romantically interested in Yūro, but she concedes when she realizes Kohaku is willing to sacrifice herself to save him.
Rin Hasumi (蓮見 鈴, Hasumi Rin)
Rin is Kohaku's father and a former researcher. Rin is protective of Kohaku and strictly instructs her not to reveal her abilities to anyone, else they would have to relocate.
Wendy (ウェンディ, Uendi)
Wendy is Kohaku's cat, who accompanies her when she flies at night. Wendy later reveals that her true identity is Shizuku Hasumi (蓮見 雫, Hasumi Shizuku), Kohaku's mother who is also able to use telekinetic abilities. Because Shizuku was dying from giving birth to Kohaku, she had transferred her consciousness to a cat.

== Media ==
=== Manga ===
Peter Pan Syndrome is written and illustrated by Mayu Sakai. It was serialized in the monthly shōjo manga magazine Ribon from the February 2005 issue released on December 28, 2004, to the October 2005 issue released on September 3, 2005. The chapters were later released in two bound volumes by Shueisha under the Ribon Mascot Comics imprint. Volume 2 includes an original short comic titled The King, The Prince, and Me (王様と王子様と私。, Ō-sama to Ōji-sama to Watashi).

In 2004, Sakai stated on Ribon's website that she came up with the story for Peter Pan Syndrome after coming up with the character Kohaku, saying that "rarely, the character came first." As the story contained fantasy elements, Sakai stated that it was difficult for her to draw it. One point she highlighted about Peter Pan Syndrome was the "innocent romance of middle school students", stating that she wanted to draw the main character being involved.

On March 1, 2016, M&C! announced that Peter Pan Syndrome had been licensed in English for Southeast Asian distribution.

No.	Japanese release date	Japanese ISBN
1	August 12, 2005	9784088568690
2	June 15, 2009	9784088568904

== Reception ==
Kono Manga ga Sugoi! praised Peter Pan Syndrome, stating that it depicts "the unbalanced minds of boys and girls who have just entered puberty" well. The story's balance and integration of fantasy elements in an everyday setting was also praised for making it "easier" for the target audience of Ribon to accept. Manga News described the first volume of "having nothing of interest", stating that the narrative was "not compelling" and that the "tragedy of losing [Kohaku's] mother doesn't haunt her as one may think." They stated the second volume slightly improved but the mystery was "disappointing". Manga Sanctuary praised the artwork and recommended the series to younger readers, stating that the story "had the makings of a good shōjo [manga]" for its romance, but older readers may not be interested for its lightheartedness and lack of depth in several of the themes, such as genetic experimentation.
