= Hiyokoi =

Japanese manga series

- Cover of the first Japanese volume

ひよ恋
- Genre: Romantic comedy
- Manga
- Written by: Moe Yukimaru
- Published by: Shueisha
- English publisher: Shueisha (digital)
- Magazine: Ribon
- Original run: November 2009 – November 2014
- Volumes: 14
- Anime film
- Directed by: Norihiro Naganuma
- Produced by: George Wada
- Studio: Production I.G.
- Released: July 30, 2010
- Runtime: 22 minutes

Hiyokoi (Japanese: ひよ恋) is a shōjo manga series written and illustrated by Moe Yukimaru. It is serialized in Shueisha's monthly shōjo manga magazine Ribon, and had been published into fourteen tankōbon volumes. The name of the series is a pun between "Hiyoko" (ひよこ, which means "chick") and "Koi" (恋, which means "love").

A twenty-two-minute-long movie based on the manga and produced by Production I.G. was released in the Ribon Summer festival on July 30, 2010. The movie was later released on a DVD along with the Yumeiro Patissiere OVA.

In 2026, the manga became licensed digitally in English on Shueisha's Manga Million platform as Hiyokoi: Chick Love.

== Plot ==
Hiyori Nishiyama is a 15-year-old girl who is extremely short. After being in an accident that caused her bones to stop growing, she starts going to high school as a freshman, along with her best friend Ritsuka. In her class there is a boy whose name is Yuushin Hirose and becomes Hiyori's friend (despite the fact that Hiyori is not very happy with his height or his constant happy attitude). After an accident where her panties were shown to the class, she is consoled by Yuushin and starts liking him, eventually growing closer to him.

== Characters ==
Hiyori Nishiyama (西山ひより, Nishiyama Hiyori) Voiced by: Ayana Taketatsu (Japanese)
A 15-year-old girl on first year of high school. She has a height of 140 centimeters and is very shy, because she doesn't want people to pick on her. She is referred to as cute by her classmates, especially by Natsuki and Yuushin. Her best friend is Ritsuka, who she has known since kindergarten. Her nicknames are Hiyo (used by Ritsuka) and Hiyorin (used by Yuushin and other classmates). Hiyori admires Yuushin because he can make friends easily, while she can't. Later, she falls in love with him. Hiyori also has a cat named Puipui, which was found by Yuushin on the school grounds. She starts to become closer to Yuushin and finally confesses her feelings at the fireworks festival.
Yuushin Hirose (広瀬結心, Hirose Yūshin) Voiced by: Kenichi Suzumura (Japanese)
A 16-year-old boy in his first year of high school and in the same class as Hiyori. He has a height of 190 centimeters. He is very popular and has a lot of friends, and is normally seen smiling. Though he is very popular, Yuushin does not have a girlfriend. He does not accept any honmei chocolate and rejects confessions as politely as possible. Yuushin spends most of his classes sleeping or eating, which annoys Hiyori. He seems to have feelings for Hiyori. When Hiyori confesses, he is about to reply but is interrupted by one of his friends. They do not talk to each other until days later during summer break, where he confesses and asks her to go out with him.
Ritsuka Nakano (中野律花, Nakano Ritsuka) Voiced by: Saki Fujita (Japanese)
A 15-year-old girl and Hiyori's best friend. She is the person who encouraged Hiyori to become more sociable and start going to school again. Hiyori calls her Ri-chan. Her most notable feature is her red twintails. She is a part of the archery club, and prefers a guy who "will not die even if an arrow pierces his heart." An extra side story reveals that Ritsuka was very popular with boys in middle school and wondered what it would be like to love someone and to have a boyfriend. A boy confessed to her and she goes to the fireworks festival with him. However he says something about Hiyori that Ritsuka finds rude, and she hits him in the face with her bag. She runs to Hiyori's house and says that right now Hiyori is the one she loves the most and then tells Hiyori that if she ever falls in love, Hiyori will be the first to know. It is revealed later in the manga that she have feelings for Kou.
Natsuki Aizawa (相沢夏輝, Aizawa Natsuki) Voiced by: Yuuko Sanpei (Japanese)
A 15-year-old girl who is Hiyori and Yuushin's classmate. She loves cute things and is one of the people who thinks Hiyori is cute. She has been classmates with Yuushin since middle school. It is revealed that Natsuki had a crush on her homeroom teacher back in her last year in middle school, but when she learned he was married she was heartbroken, so she cut her hair. Natsuki decided that she will only grow her hair when she has found someone that she loves. Her birthday is on July 18. She starts to cry when Hiyori goes out with Yuushin and is seen saying "Hiyori, I wish you the best", and her classmates comment that she looks like a girl who got her heart broken. She is in Hiyori's homeroom class during her first and second year and is one of Hiyori's close friends.
Kisaki Tominaga (富永きさき, Tominaga Kisaki)
Kisaki is a former classmate of Yuushin's. She confessed to Yuushin when they were young, but it is unknown what he said to her. She asked Hiyori to deliver some Valentine's chocolate to Yuushin, but Hiyori broke down and couldn't do it. Kisaki attends a prestigious school. She is very beautiful, and has a 'short person complex' (she envies short people like Hiyori). She later moves to England as her dad's job is transferred there. She doesn't tell Yuushin when her flight is, but Hiyori finds out and goes with Yushin to say one last goodbye. She later sends a postcard to Yuushin and Hiyori and tells Hiyori to become closer to Yushin, as he may be taken by someone else if she doesn't, revealing that Kisaki has gotten over her crush and wants Hiyori to be with Yuushin.
Kou Nitobe (新渡戸コウ, Nitobe Kou)
Kou is one of Hiyori's classmates in her second year, and sits beside her in class. He has a similar personality and height to Hiyori, causing him to constantly be teased about being perfect for Hiyori during his first year. When he first met Hiyori, he disliked her because he thought that she had a calculating personality, and believed that Hiyori was an attention seeking person. He eventually becomes one of Hiyori's good friends. He does not enjoy school trips. He later meets Ri-chan who he finds weird, and notices that she eats a lot. Hiyori thinks that Kou and Ri-chan would look good as a couple. Near the end of Chapter 24, it is seen that he has developed feelings for Hiyori, and shows he is thinking of her relationship with Yuushin. At the end of Chapter 37, he confesses to Hiyori.
Reina Matsushima (松島れいな, Matsushima Reina)
Reina is Hiyori's second year classmate, but is a year older because she is a returning student from the United States. She is a happy-go-lucky girl, and isn't afraid to speak her mind. She sits beside Yuushin in class, and has a crush on him, which the entire class (including Yuushin) is aware of. She considers Hiyori her rival and comrade, because they were both 'rejected' by Yuushin, although Hiyori has not yet given Yuushin a direct confession. She also told Yuushin that Hiyori and Kou looked good together. It is revealed that she wasn't always so outspoken and was very shy in her first year of high school, so she moved abroad to study and sees Hiyori as the 'past her'. She dresses Hiyori up for the fireworks display and is happy that Yuushin and Hiyori are going out. She has a boyfriend from America, which shocks everyone as she says she likes Yuushin. She tells Yushin that she loves her boyfriend and him the same amount.
Miyoko Mitani (三谷美代子, Mitani Miyoko)
Yuushin and Hiyori's first and second year homeroom teacher. She is 28 years old when the manga starts, and has a hard time finding a boyfriend, although she frequently goes to "kouko"s. She is affectionately called Mi-tan by her first year class. She has about three cats, all of whom have been saved and given to her by Yuushin. At the end of some chapters she has an after school diary where she talks about the classmates and her relationships in the past. One talks about when she confessed to a boy and they started going out. When he asks what she likes about him she replies with strange answers such as "the way you chew your food 20 times before swallowing", implying that she's been watching him and probably stalking him. He of course becomes creeped out and doesn't talk to her again. Another side chapter showed Yuushin and the homeroom class discussing why Mi-tan has had relationship problems, and showed an interview with a man who said that she is really pretty but when she gets drunk she becomes "annoying". Mi-tan says that she only drinks so that she can engage in conversation, and Yushin concludes the meeting by saying that Mi-tan's personal mistakes cause relationship problems.

== Volume list ==
No.	Japanese release date	Japanese ISBN
1	March 15, 2010	978-4-08-867044-7
2	July 15, 2010	978-4-08-867065-2
3	November 15, 2010	978-4-08-867083-6
4	March 15, 2011	978-4-08-867106-2
5	July 15, 2011	978-4-08-867131-4
6	November 15, 2011	978-4-08-867153-6
7	March 15, 2012	978-4-08-867185-7
8	July 13, 2012	978-4-08-867210-6
9	December 14, 2012	978-4-08-867238-0
10	May 15, 2013	978-4-08-867269-4
11	October 15, 2013	978-4-08-867294-6
12	March 14, 2014	978-4-08-867317-2
13	August 12, 2014	978-4-08-867332-5
14	January 15, 2015	978-4-08-867353-0

== Anime ==
An anime adaptation of the manga was announced on April 23, 2010. It aired on three events of Ribon magazine: one in Tokyo (July 30, 2010), another in Osaka (August 6, 2010) and the last one in Nagoya (August 19, 2010). On October 2, 2010, a DVD containing the Hiyokoi OVA and a Yumeiro Patissiere special was released along with the November issue of Ribon. The anime was directed by Naganuma Norihiko, using character designs of Shibata Yuka and produced by Production I.G. The OVA adapts the first two chapters of the manga.
