= Momo (manga) =

Manga by Mayu Sakai

- Cover of the Japanese version of vol. 1, first released on February 13, 2009
- Genre: Fantasy
- Manga
- Written by: Mayu Sakai
- Published by: Shueisha
- Imprint: Ribon Mascot Comics
- Magazine: Ribon
- Original run: August 1, 2008 – April 2, 2011
- Volumes: 7

Momo (stylized as MOMO), also titled Momo: Welcome to the World-end Garden, is a Japanese manga series by Mayu Sakai. Momo was serialized in the monthly shōjo manga magazine Ribon from August 1, 2008, to April 2, 2011.

== Plot ==
After experiencing a string of bad luck on her 16th birthday, Yume Odagiri saves Momo from getting hit by a car. Momo reveals herself to be a great demon who destroys planets and has come to destroy Earth. However, she gives Yume the role of being Earth's representative, where if she is able to please Momo with seven things from Earth within two years, the planet will be spared. The points that Yume earns appear as charms as a charm bracelet.

As Yume accrues more points, her kindness allows Momo to become fond of her, causing Momo to reject another bid to become the Earth's representative from Miyū, Yume's classmate. In addition, Yume begins learning more about Momo through her relationships with Piko, a rival demon dedicated to defeating her, and Nanagi, Momo's attendant and a former representative of his planet. Piko's plans to defeat Momo are ultimately thwarted when Yume rejects an alliance with him and Nanagi and Momo resolve their complicated relationship through her intervention. Momo also begins questioning her existence as a demon, causing herself to briefly split between her jaded, demon personality, and her innocent personality who wants to stay with Yume forever. Through this, Yume learns that Momo's existence is dependent on destroying planets for its energy.

By the time Yume nears her sixth point, she and Nanagi are in a romantic relationship; however, Nanagi realizes she is still secretly in love with her childhood friend, Kanaka. This is also complicated by her estranged father, Ryosuke, returning to her life and asking her to move with him to Sweden to live with his new wife. Yume turns down her father's offer in order to stay in Japan and reconciles her feelings for Kanaka. Shortly after the two begin dating, Kanaka is hospitalized for his chronic illness and has one year left to live.

Yume becomes distraught and nearly believes the world is better off destroyed, before Miyū and her neighbors help her realize she is supported. At the same time, Momo goes into shock over Kanaka's fate and again decides she no longer wants to be a demon. Sanari, who is another attendant of Momo, kidnaps Momo and reveals himself to be a god, who created the universe, Momo, and Piko out of boredom. He gives Yume the option to have Momo, Nanagi, and Piko to be reincarnated as humans and Kanaka's illness to be healed in exchange for her taking Momo's place as a demon and everyone's memories of her to be wiped. Yume, however, rejects his offer. Momo wishes to stay with Yume, but they cannot be together as long as Momo is a demon and Yume is human. As a promise to meet again, Momo gives Yume her final point and they bid each other farewell. Yume goes on with her life as normal, while Kanaka's illness is healed. In the distant future, Yume and Momo are reincarnated as sisters.

== Characters ==
Yume Odagiri (小田切 夢, Odagiri Yume)
Voiced by: Saki Fujita (vomic)
Yume is a first-year high school student who lives alone after her father left the country, forcing her to work a part-time job for living expenses. She becomes Earth's representative to save the planet from Momo. She is in love with Kanaka, but she puts a distance between them because his mother disapproves of her.
Momo (モモ)
Voiced by: Yukari Tamura (vomic)
Momo is a great demon who takes the form of a young girl on Earth. She consumes energy through destroying planets. She soon becomes fond of Yume and comes to question her existence as a great demon because of their relationship.
Sanari (沙成)
Voiced by: Junji Majima (vomic)
Sanari is Momo's attendant. He is later revealed to be a god, who created the universe, Momo, and Piko out of boredom.
Nanagi (ナナギ)
Voiced by: Atsushi Abe (vomic)
Nanagi is Momo's attendant. He is a former representative for his planet, of which he was the prince, but he resents Momo for causing unease in his village. However, he later admits Momo saved him emotionally and sees her as a younger sister. Initially having a rough relationship with Yume, he is assigned to become her bodyguard when Piko begins targeting her. As he gets to know Yume better, he falls in love with her. He realizes Yume and Kanaka are in love with each other, causing him to urge Yume to face her feelings towards him. At the end of the series, he leaves Earth to return to his home planet.
Kanaka Itō (伊東 叶歌, Itō Kanaka)
Voiced by: Sōichirō Hoshi (vomic)
Kanaka is Yume's childhood friend and his family owns a cake shop. He is cheerful, but he is also chronically ill. Though he is in love with Yume, he supports her decisions.
Ponkichi (ぽんきち)
Ponkichi is a plushie based on the in-series Scottish Fold character Suko, who was thrown away by his owner Miyabi. After Yume saves him from the river, Momo takes a liking to him and gives him the ability to move and speak.
Piko (ピコ)
Piko is another great demon who destroys planets and sees Momo as a rival; however, his abilities can never surpass her. He offers Yume and Nanagi to become his partner to defeat her. He soon grows fond of Yume after she shows kindness to him and it is later revealed he was created by Sanari. By the end of the series, Piko chooses to accompany Sanari as a demon.
Miyū Fujita (藤田 実結, Fujita Miyū)
Miyū is Yume's classmate and the wealthy daughter of a CEO. She initially opposes Yume being in the Earth's representative and for her relationship with Nanagi, eventually convincing her to be the representative for a brief period. Eventually Miyū relinquishes her position after realizing Yume's kindness makes her better fit for the role. Miyu also moves on romantically from Nanagi to Sanari.

== Media ==
=== Manga ===
Momo is written and illustrated by Mayu Sakai. It was serialized in the monthly shōjo manga magazine Ribon from the September 2008 issue released on August 1, 2008, to the May 2011 issue released on April 2, 2011. The chapters were later released in seven bound volumes by Shueisha under the Ribon Mascot Comics imprint. Volume 1 includes an original short comic titled How to Save Your World (キミの世界の救い方, Kimi no Sekai no Sukuikata).

Sakai stated in 2008 that she conceived the idea of Momo through a line from her previous work, Rockin' Heaven, of which the character Akira had said, "It'd be better if the world was destroyed." She further stated, "It's like, girls at that age would think like that no matter how small or big the problem is." She described the story as "172 degrees different from Rockin' Heaven" and that the first chapter had an action scene, which was "rare" from her. Sakai revealed that her favorite character was initially Momo and later Kanaka.

No.	Japanese release date	Japanese ISBN
1	February 13, 2009	9784088568690
2	June 15, 2009	9784088568904
3	October 15, 2009	9784088670157
4	March 15, 2010	9784088670423
5	August 12, 2010	9784088670713
6	January 14, 2011	9784088670911
7	June 15, 2011	9784088671253

=== Audio drama ===
During the series' run, a vomic (voice comic) was released on Shueisha's website in 2009, which adapted the first chapter.

== Reception ==
Volume 5 debuted at #29 on Oricon and sold 19,842 copies in its first week. Volume 6 debuted at #30 on Oricon and sold 13,785 copies in its first week.
