= Blue Friend (manga) =

Japanese manga series

- Volume 1 cover art

ブルーフレンド (Burū Furendo)
- Genre: Yuri
- Manga
- Written by: Fumi Eban
- Published by: Shueisha
- Imprint: Ribon Mascot Comics
- Magazine: Ribon
- Original run: April 3, 2010 – October 2, 2010
- Volumes: 3
- Sequels and spin-offs
- Blue Friend: After Days (2010); Blue Friend: 2nd Season (2011); Blue Friend: Nijiiro no Kanojo (2011)

Blue Friend (Japanese: ブルーフレンド, Hepburn: Burū Furendo) is a yuri manga series written and drawn by Fumi Eban, and serialized in Shueisha's monthly shōjo manga magazine Ribon in 2010. It was followed by the one-shot sequel Blue Friend: After Days (Note: Blue Friend: After Days (ブルーフレンド〜after days〜)) in 2010, and by the sequel series Blue Friend: 2nd Season (Note: Blue Friend: 2nd Season (ブルーフレンド 2nd Season)) and the spin-off Blue Friend: Nijiiro no Kanojo (Note: Blue Friend: Nijiiro no Kanojo (ブルーフレンド～虹色の彼女～; "Blue Friend: Rainbow-Colored Girlfriend")) in 2011.

== Plot ==
Blue Friend is a yuri manga about two girls who are very different from each other, who waver between love and friendship: the outgoing and athletic Ayumu Kurihara (栗原 歩, Kurihara Ayumi), and the quiet Misuzu Tsukishima (月島 美鈴, Tsukishima Misuzu). After Ayumu cracks through Misuzu's self-imposed alienation, Misuzu begins to fall in love with Ayumu and kisses her. Misuzu tells Ayumu that the kiss meant nothing, and Ayumu is not sure what to believe. Satsuki Azuma (東 五月, Azuma Satsuki), a delinquent girl from Misuzu's past, shows up and begins reminding Misuzu of an incident she wants to forget, especially now that she is with Ayumu.

== Production and release ==
Blue Friend was created by Fumi Eban, who wrote the story with the idea of the protagonist coming in contact with characters who have an immature or inexperienced image of social detachment; this is also where the title is derived from, as "blue" (青い, aoi) can metaphorically mean "inexperienced" in Japanese, similarly to "green" in English. She was excited to create a work with a theme that was new to her, and happy to get the chance to create another serialized story, but was worried that the theme might be too complex to appeal to children reading the series. For 2nd Season, she also worried about having to come up with a new and appealing take on the same theme.

The concept of the mysterious girl Misuzu immediately came to Eban when she decided on the theme; she commented that she has a preference as a creator for female characters who are "slightly odd". For 2nd Season, she drew on her own shortcomings and created a protagonist who embodies them: Kanako has a tendency to be easily influenced by other people. As a counterpoint, Aoi was written with a focus on her tendency to be straightforward and to speak her mind. When creating the cast, Eban came up with several names, and then assigned them based on which fit which character. She tried to create visual variety, including by varying the designs of the characters' eyes, and put effort into trying to express cuteness through the female characters.

The original Blue Friend series was serialized in Shueisha's shōjo manga magazine Ribon from its May 2010 issue on April 3, 2010, to the November 2010 issue on October 2, 2010, and was followed by the one-shot sequel Blue Friend: After Days on December 16, 2010, in the magazine's winter special issue. The sequel Blue Friend: 2nd Season was serialized from the July 2011 issue on June 2, 2011, to the November 2011 issue on October 3, 2011, and the spin-off Blue Friend: Nijiiro no Kanojo was published in Ribon Special Real on October 21, 2011.

Blue Friend, After Days, and 2nd Season, were later released across three tankōbon volumes under Shueisha's imprint Ribon Mascot Comics, from September 15, 2010, to November 15, 2011; these volumes have since been published in Chinese by Sharp Point Press, German by Tokyopop, Korean by Haksan Publishing, and Thai by Bongkoch Publishing. Shueisha later published Nijiiro no Kanojo in the first Japanese volume of Eban's 2015 manga Seishun wa Zombie Deshita on July 25, 2016.

=== Volumes ===
Blue Friend volumes
No.	Japanese release date	Japanese ISBN
1	September 15, 2010	978-4088670751
Blue Friend, chapter 1–5
2	February 15, 2011	978-4088670997
Blue Friend, chapter 6–7; Blue Friend: After Days
3	November 15, 2011	978-4088671543
Blue Friend: 2nd Season, chapter 1–5

== Reception ==
According to Natalie, Blue Friend drew attention among readers for being a yuri story serialized in Ribon; they noted an increase of yuri works in magazines targeted at girls, with manga like Blue Friend and Marimo Shirasawa's Maidens in the Forest of Field Rose (Note: Maidens in the Forest of Field Rose (野ばらの森の乙女たち, Nobara no Mori no Otome-tachi) was serialized in Kodansha's shōjo manga magazine Nakayoshi.) both premiering in 2010.

The German magazine Animania praised the story for its drama and "well-placed climaxes", as well as the "sensitive" portrayal of comedic and tender moments between the protagonists. They also liked the artwork and layout, which they thought conveyed the characters' feelings well, and made for a smooth reading experience. Mangapedia recommended the series for its portrayal of friendship, which they found relatable.

None of the three Japanese volumes appeared on Oricon's weekly top 30 comics sales charts during their debut weeks in Japan, indicating that they respectively sold fewer than 30,000; 23,000; and 29,000 physical copies during those periods.
