= Ribon =

Japanese manga magazine

- Cover of the May 2006 issue (featuring Love-Berrish! by Nana Haruta)
- Categories: Shōjo manga
- Frequency: Monthly
- Circulation: 89,333; (July–September 2026)
- Founded: 1955
- Company: Shueisha
- Country: Japan
- Language: Japanese
- Website: http://ribon.shueisha.co.jp

Ribon (Japanese: りぼん; lit. 'Ribbon') is a monthly Japanese shōjo manga magazine published by Shueisha on the third of each month. First issued in August 1955, its rivals are Nakayoshi and Ciao. It is one of the best-selling shōjo manga magazines, having sold over 590 million copies since 1978. Its circulation was in the millions between 1987 and 2001, peaking at 2.3 million in 1994. In 2009, the magazine's circulation was 274,167. In 2010, the circulation dropped to 243,334.

Ribon has also inspired multiple spin-off magazines, including Bessatsu Ribon (1966–1968); Ribon Comics, renamed Junior Comics (1967–1968); (Note: The January 1968 debut issue was released in 1967.) Ribon Comic (1968–1971); (Note: The January 1969 debut issue was released in 1968.) Ribon Deluxe (1975–1978); and Ribon Original (1981–2006).

== Format ==
Celebrating Ribon magazine's seventieth anniversary, the magazine's pages are printed on multicolored newsprint. Often exceeding 400 pages, the issues are distributed with a sackful of goodies (furoku) ranging from small toys to colorful note pads themed around manga serialized in the magazine. In some issues, readers can send in stamps for mail order gifts (zen-in). The manga series from the magazine are later compiled and published in book form (tankōbon) under the Ribon Mascot Comics (RMC) imprint.

== Serializations ==
=== Current ===
- Animal Yokochō (2000–present)
- Onna no Ko tte. (2011–present)
- Zekkyō Gakkyū Tensei (2015–present)
- Not Your Idol (2018–present)

=== Past ===
==== 1955–1979 ====
- Rumi-chan Kyōshitsu (1958)
- Himitsu no Akko-chan (1962–1965)
- Sally the Witch (1966–1967)
- Shiroi Heya no Futari (1971) (Note: Published in the spin-off magazine Ribon Comic.)
- Arabesque (1971–1973) (Note: The first part was serialized in Ribon from 1971 to 1973; the second part was serialized in Hana to Yume from 1974 to 1975.)

==== 1980–1989 ====
- Tokimeki Tonight (1982–1994)
- Chibi Maruko-chan (1986–1996)
- Handsome na Kanojo (1988–1992)
- Whisper of the Heart (1989)

==== 1990–1999 ====
- Hime-chan's Ribbon (1990–1994)
- Tenshi Nanka Ja Nai (1991–1994)
- Akazukin Chacha (1991–2000)
- Marmalade Boy (1992–1995)
- Anata to Scandal (1993–1995)
- Kodomo no Omocha (1994–1998)
- Nurse Angel Ririka SOS (1995–1996)
- Neighborhood Story (1995–1998)
- Kero Kero Chime (1995–1998)
- Baby Love (1995–1999)
- I.O.N (1997)
- Mint na Bokura (1997–2000)
- Good Morning Call (1998–2002)
- Fancy Lala (1998)
- Last Quarter (1998–1999)
- Phantom Thief Jeanne (1998–2000)
- Gals! (1998–2002)
- St. Dragon Girl (1999–2003)

==== 2000–2009 ====
- Time Stranger Kyoko (2000–2001)
- Full Moon o Sagashite (2002–2004)
- Ultra Maniac (2002–2004)
- Aishiteruze Baby (2002–2005)
- St. Dragon Girl Miracle (2003–2005)
- ChocoMimi (2004–2019)
- Cactus's Secret (2004–2005)
- The Gentlemen's Alliance Cross (2004–2008)
- Peter Pan Syndrome (2004–2005)
- Love-Berrish! (2005–2007)
- Rockin' Heaven (2005–2008)
- Powerpuff Girls Z (2006–2007)
- Crash! (2007–2013)
- Chocolate Cosmos (2007–2008)
- Hello Kitty Doki (2007–2008)
- Hello Kitty Peace (2008)
- Mistress Fortune (2008)
- Momo (2008–2011)
- Zekkyō Gakkyū (2008–2015)
- Sakura Hime: The Legend of Princess Sakura (2008–2012)
- Stardust Wink (2009–2012)
- Hiyokoi (2009–2014)

==== 2010–2019 ====
- Blue Friend (2010–2011)
- Pretty Rhythm (2010–2012)
- Nagareboshi Lens (2011–2014)
- Sugar Soldier (2011–2015)
- Rozen Maiden: Dolls Talk (2012–2014)
- Romantica Clock (2012–2016)
- ChocoTan! (2012–2017)
- Tsubasa to Hotaru (2013–2017)
- Little Witch Academia: Tsukiyo no Ōkan (2015)
- Honey Lemon Soda (2015–2026)
- Acro Trip (2017–2022)
- 6-gatsu no Love Letter (2018)
- Ui × Kon (2019–2025)

==== 2020–2029 ====
- In the Name of the Mermaid Princess (2020–2023)

== Circulation ==
Year / Period	Monthly circulation	Magazine sales
1978	1,350,000	16,200,000
1979	1,350,000	16,200,000
1980	1,500,000	18,000,000
1981	1,500,000	18,000,000
1982	1,500,000	18,000,000
1983	1,500,000	18,000,000
1984	1,700,000	20,400,000
1985	1,800,000	21,600,000
1986	2,000,000	24,000,000
1987	2,200,000	26,400,000
1988	2,000,000	24,000,000
1989	2,300,000	27,600,000
1990	2,300,000	27,600,000
January 1991 to March 1991	2,300,000	6,900,000
April 1991 to March 1992	2,400,000	28,800,000
April 1992 to March 1993	2,400,000	28,800,000
April 1993 to March 1994	2,400,000	28,800,000
April 1994 to December 1994	2,300,000	20,700,000
1995	2,160,000	25,920,000
1996	1,750,000	21,000,000
1997	1,630,000	19,560,000
1998	1,350,000	16,200,000
1999	1,350,000	16,200,000
2000	1,350,000	16,200,000
2001	1,260,000	15,120,000
2002	980,000	11,760,000
2003	860,000	10,320,000
2004	729,167	8,750,004
2005	537,500	6,450,000
2006	400,000	4,800,000
2007	376,666	4,519,992
2008	330,000	3,960,000
January 2009 to September 2009	274,167	2,467,503
October 2009 to September 2010	243,334	2,920,008
October 2010 to September 2011	209,334	2,512,008
October 2011 to September 2012	212,500	2,550,000
October 2012 to September 2013	201,667	2,420,004
October 2013 to September 2014	202,500	2,430,000
October 2014 to September 2015	195,834	2,350,008
October 2015 to September 2016	181,667	2,180,004
October 2016 to September 2017	172,917	2,075,004
October 2017 to March 2018	152,500	915,000
1978 to March 2018		593,579,535
