= St. Dragon Girl =

Manga

- St. ♥ Dragon Girl

聖[セイント] ♡ ドラゴンガール (Kiyoshi Seinto Doragon Gaaru)
- Genre: Comedy, fantasy
- Manga
- Written by: Natsumi Matsumoto
- Published by: Shueisha
- English publisher: Viz Media
- Magazine: Ribon
- Original run: October 1999 – April 2003
- Volumes: 8
- Manga

St. ♥ Dragon Girl Miracle
- Written by: Natsumi Matsumoto
- Published by: Shueisha
- Magazine: Ribon
- Original run: June 2003 – 2006
- Volumes: 5

St. ♥ Dragon Girl (聖[セイント] ♡ ドラゴンガール, Kiyoshi Seinto Doragon Gāru) is a Japanese manga by Natsumi Matsumoto, who also created Yumeiro Patissiere. It was serialized in Ribon from October 1999 through April 2003. The individual chapters were collected and published in eight volumes by Shueisha. The series focuses on childhood friends Momoka and Ryuga, after Momoka is possessed by a dragon while protecting Ryuga. It is followed by a sequel series titled St. ♥ Dragon Girl Miracle (聖[セイント] ♡ ドラゴンガール みらくる, Kiyoshi [Seinto] Doragon Gaaru Mirakuru) which focuses on Momoko and Ryuga's daughter, Anjuu Sendou.

The series is licensed for English language release in North America by Viz Media, who released the first volume on December 2, 2008, and the final volume on September 7, 2010.

== Release ==
While both of the series were published by Shueisha in Japan and Tokyopop in Germany, St. Dragon Girl was also published in North America by Viz Media.

=== Volume list ===
==== St. Dragon Girl ====
No.	Original release date	Original ISBN	North American release date	North American ISBN
01	September 19, 2000	—	December 2, 2008	978-1-4215-2010-0
Chapters 1-4
02	April 18, 2001	—	March 3, 2009	978-1-4215-2011-7
Chapters 5-8; Extra: Far East Working Girl
03	August 12, 2001	—	June 2, 2009	978-1-4215-2012-4
Chapter 9-12; Extras: Little Dragon Special, Trouble on a Snowy Night
04	January 20, 2002	—	September 1, 2009	978-1-4215-2013-1
Chapters 13-17
05	May 20, 2002	—	December 1, 2009	978-1-4215-2014-8
Chapters 18-21; Extras: Natural Thunder Girl, The Seven Mysteries of the School Special
06	December 20, 2002	—	March 3, 2010	978-1-4215-2015-5
Chapters 22-27; Extra: Magical Ron-Ron
07	March 19, 2003	—	June 1, 2010	978-1-4215-2016-2
Chapters 28-32; Extra: Midsummer Shaolin Mermaid
08	September 12, 2003	—	September 7, 2010	978-1-4215-2017-9
Chapters 33-34; Extras: Bonus Story #1, Bonus Story #2: Xi Chen's Dangerous Games, Bonus Story #3

==== St. Dragon Girl Miracle ====
No.	Japanese release date	Japanese ISBN
01	—	—
Chapters 1-4
02	—	—
Chapters 5-8; Extra: Momoka and Ryuga's Idiot Parent Diary
03	—	—
Chapters 9-13; Extras: Secret Midnight Snapshot, Momoka and Ryuga: Diary of the Doting Parents
04	April 20, 2005	—
Chapters 14-19; Extra: Momoka and Ryuga's Diary of Parenthood
05	—	—
Chapters 20-25

== Reception ==
Leroy Douresseaux of the Comic Book Bin claims that the use of magic in the series "energizes what could have been standard fare". He also claims that the mixture of "typically super-pretty shojo manga art with demon-fighting" is a "fun read". He also likens the series to a root beer float, "At some point, you might be too old to have such a really sweet treat in an extra-large size, but it is still sooooo good". Several times, he said that although the series was intended for younger girls, it would also appeal older readers. Deb Aoki of About.com considered this as a perfect series for tweens with "charming art, simple stories and chaste romance." Ed Sizemore of Manga Worth Reading felt that Matsumoto managed to create a cast of wholesome people that aren't boring", but was frustrated by the main characters' refusal to admit their mutual attraction to each another. Anime News Network's Carlo Santos disliked the first volume, considering it episodic and formulaic nature, similar to other high school romances, and having ordinary art work.
