= Batuque =

Batuque may refer to:

- Batuque (Brazil), various Afro-Brazilian practices, including music, dance, combat game and religion
- Batuque (Cape Verde), a Cape Verdean music and dance genre
- Batuque (manga), a Japanese manga series
- Batuque (religion), an Afro-Brazilian religion
- "Batuque" (song), a 1992 song by Daniela Mercury
- Batuque, the Soul of a People, a 2006 Cape Verdean film
- Batuque FC, a Cape Verdean football club
