= List of Kingdom chapters =

Kingdom is a Japanese manga series written and illustrated by Yasuhisa Hara. It provides a fictionalized account of the Warring States period primarily through the experiences of the war orphan Xin and his comrades as he fights to become the greatest general under the heavens, and in doing so, unifying China for the first time in 500 years. Kingdom has been serialized in Weekly Young Jump since January 26, 2006, with its chapters collected into eighty-one tankōbon volumes by publisher Shueisha as of November 18, 2026.

== Volumes ==
No.	Original release date	Original ISBN	English release date	English ISBN
1	May 19, 2006	4-08-877079-X	November 11, 2025	978-1-9747-5921-7
1. "The Boy With No Name" (無名の少年, Mumei no shōnen); 2. "The Map" (地図, Chizu); 3. "Double" (身代わり, Migawari); 4. "The Rebel Army" (反乱軍の手, Hanran gun no te); 5. "A Younger Half Brother From Another Mother" (異母弟, Ibo-tei); 6. "Piao's Determination" (漂の決意, Piāo no ketsui); 7. "The Assassin Who Came From the South" (南方から来た刺客, Nanpō kara kita shikaku); 8. "The Wyvern of Qin" (秦の怪鳥, Qín no kaichō)
2	August 18, 2006	4-08-877129-X	December 16, 2025	978-1-9747-5924-8
9. "The Mountain People" (山の民, Yama no min); 10. "Off Guard" (油断, Yudan); 11. "Steadfast" (不退転, Fu taiten); 12. "The Loyal Retainer" (忠臣, Chūshin); 13. "A Heated Battle" (熱き合戦, Netsu ki kassen); 14. "The Path to Becoming a General" (将軍への道, Shōgun e no dō); 15. "Minister Lü" (呂丞相, Lǚ jōshō); 16. "The Horse and Liquor" (馬酒兵三百, Mǎjiǔ hei sanbyaku); 17. "Encounter" (遭遇, Sōgū); 18. "Passing the Torch" (託す思い, Takusu omoi); 19. "An Astonishing World" (驚愕の世界, Kyōgaku no sekai)
3	November 17, 2006	4-08-877171-0	January 20, 2026	978-1-9747-6131-9
20. "Yang Duanhe" (楊端和, Yotanwa); 21. "The Meeting" (会談, Kaidan); 22. "Alliance" (盟, Mei); 23. "The Crown Prince's Seat" (太子の座, Taishi no za); 24. "Cavalry Dream" (騎兵の夢, Kihei no yume); 25. "3,000 vs. 80,000" (3千対8万, Sanzen tsui hachi man); 26. "The Royal Capital Xianyang" (王都咸陽, Ōto Kan'yō); 27. "The Gate Opens" (開門, Kaimon); 28. "The Vanguard" (先陣, Senjin); 29. "Quick as Lightning" (電光石火, Denkō sekka); 30. "Confrontation" (対面, Taimen)
4	February 19, 2007	978-4-08-877213-4	February 17, 2026	978-1-9747-6132-6
31. "Wei Xing's Crossbow Unit" (魏興の弩行隊, Gikō no ishiyumi gyō-tai); 32. "Chief Butcher" (人斬り長, Hitokiri-chō); 33. "Catalyst" (触発, Shokuhatsu); 34. "Frenzy" (逆上, Gyakujō); 35. "Combined Strength" (合力, Gōriki); 36. "The Sneering of the Brother King" (嘲笑う王弟, Azakewarau ōtei); 37. "Enemy" (仇, Ada); 38. "Lan Kai" (ランカイ, Rankai); 39. "Ja Jio" (バジオウ, Bajiō); 40. "Evil" (悪, Aku); 41. "The Final Blow" (決定打, Kettei-da)
5	May 18, 2007	978-4-08-877259-2	March 17, 2026	978-1-9747-6133-3
42. "The Vanishing Dream" (夢幻, Mugen); 43. "The Wyvern Flies In" (怪鳥飛来, Kaichō hirai); 44. "King Zhao" (昭王, Shō ō); 45. "Confrontation" (対峙, Taiji); 46. "Brothers" (兄弟, Kyōdai); 47. "The First Castle" (最初の城, Saisho no shiro); 48. "Recruitment" (募集, Boshū); 49. "Wu" (伍, Go); 50. "The Wei Army" (魏国軍, Wèi kokugun); 51. "Reunion" (再会, Saikai); 52. "She Gan Plain" (蛇甘平原, Dakan heigen); Extra Story: "Memories of Heibei Village" (黒卑村回想, Hēibēi son kaisō)
6	July 19, 2007	978-4-08-877289-9	April 21, 2026	978-1-9747-6134-0
53. "Military Organization" (軍編成, Gun hensei); 54. "Five Bodies as One" (五身一体, Go mi ittai); 55. "Fight with Five" (伍の戦い, Go no tatakai); 56. "War Chariots" (戦車隊, Sensha-tai); 57. "Qiang Lei's Defensive Wall" (羌瘣の防壁, Kyōkai no bōheki); 58. "One-on-One" (一騎打ち, Ikki uchi); 59. "Sense of Smell" (嗅覚, Kyūkaku); 60. "The Cavalry's Furious Charge" (騎馬隊怒涛, Kiba-tai dotō); 61. "Honor and Reward" (栄誉と恩賞, Eiyo to onshō); 62. "Closing the Gap" (肉迫, Nikuhaku); 63. "Miracles" (奇蹟, Kiseki)
7	October 19, 2007	978-4-08-877336-0	May 19, 2026	978-1-9747-6135-7
64. "A General's Words" (将の言葉, Shō no kotoba); 65. "Barging In" (乱入者, Rannyū-sha); 66. "The Model of a War General" (武将の型, Bushō no kata); 67. "The Ability of a General" (将の才力, Shō no sai-ryoku); 68. "General" (将軍, Shōgun); 69. "Pincer Attack" (挟撃, Kyōgeki); 70. "Two Great Rivals" (両雄, Ryōyū); 71. "General Showdown" (大将対決, Taishō taiketsu); 72. "Lost Nation" (亡国, Bōkoku); 73. "Returning Home" (帰国, Kikoku); 74. "Attendance" (伽, Togi)
8	December 19, 2007	978-4-08-877361-2	June 16, 2026	978-1-9747-6136-4
75. "The Past" (過去, Kako); 76. "The Black Market Trade" (闇商, Yami shō); 77. "Passing Checkpoints" (関所抜け, Sekisho nuke); 78. "Alone" (孤独, Kodoku); 79. "Ghosts" (亡霊, Bōrei); 80. "Parting" (訣別, Ketsubetsu); 81. "Farewell" (別離, Betsuri); 82. "Hundred-Man Commander" (百将, Hyaku shō); 83. "Chi You" (蚩尤, Shiyū); 84. "Assassins Strike" (刺客急襲, Shikaku kyūshū); 85. "The Dance of Qiang Lei" (羌瘣舞う, Kyōkai mau)
9	March 19, 2008	978-4-08-877409-1	July 21, 2026	978-1-9747-6137-1
86. "Mastermind" (黒幕, Kuromaku); 87. "A Thousand-Year Name" (千年の名, Sen nen no na); 88. "Comrades in Arms" (戦友, Sen'yū); 89. "Weakness" (弱点, Jakuten); 90. "Buying Time" (時間稼ぎ, Jikan kasegi); 91. "Element" (本領, Honryō); 92. "Secret" (秘密, Himitsu); 93. "Identity" (正体, Shōtai); 94. "Ritual" (祭, Matsuri); 95. "Law" (掟, Okite); 96. "The Lü Shi Faction" (呂氏派, Ryo-shi-ha)
10	June 19, 2008	978-4-08-877462-6	August 18, 2026	978-1-9747-6138-8
97. "The Enigmatic Man" (未知なる男, Michi naru otoko); 98. "A Report to the Throne" (上奏, Jōsō); 99. "The Six Great Generals" (六大将軍, Roku dai shōgun); 100. "The Two" (二人, Futari); 101. "A New Path" (新たな道, Arata na dō); 102. "It's Up To Me" (オレ次第, Ore shidai); 103. "Tactician" (軍師, Gunshi); 104. "A Nighttime Talk" (夜語り, Yoru-katari); 105. "A Naked Gathering" (裸の付き合い, Hadaka no tsukiai); 106. "Training Request" (修行願い, Shugyō negai); 107. "Stateless Land" (無国籍地帯, Mu kokuseki chitai)
11	September 19, 2008	978-4-08-877504-3	September 15, 2026	978-1-9747-6139-5
108. "The Three Greats" (三大天, San dai ten); 109. "The Devastation of Qin" (趙の蹂躙, Zhào no jūrin); 110. "A General's Strengths" (将の力量, Shō no rikiryō); 111. "Assignment" (任命, Ninmei); 112. "Gathering Comrades" (戦友集結, Sen'yū shūketsu); 113. "Mǎyáng" (馬陽, Uma yō); 114. "Wang Yi Sets Out" (王騎出陣, Ōki shutsujin); 115. "Pang Nuan" (龐煖, Hōken); 116. "Crystallisation of Martial Arts" (武の結晶, Bu no kesshō); 117. "The Reason" (理由, Riyū); 118. "The Armies Assemble" (両軍揃う, Ryōgun sorou)
12	December 19, 2008	978-4-08-877563-0	October 20, 2026	978-1-9747-6140-1
119. "The Vanguard Advances" (先鋒隊動く, Senpō-tai ugoku); 120. "Mission" (任務, Ninmu); 121. "Infiltration" (潜行, Senkō); 122. "Attack" (特攻, Tokkō); 123. "Left Army in Disarray" (左軍混乱, Hidari gun konran); 124. "Take Them by Surprise" (虚を突く, Kyo o tsuku); 125. "Distance" (距離, Kyori); 126. "Crack Troops" (精兵部隊, Seihei butai); 127. "Skilled" (上手, Jōte); 128. "One Hundred Parts" (百等分, Hyaku tōbun); 129. "The Arrow Loosed" (飛矢, Hi ya)
13	March 19, 2009	978-4-08-877611-8	November 17, 2026	978-1-9747-6148-7
130. "Renown" (名声, Meisei); 131. "The Second Day" (二日目, Futa-ka-me); 132. "Might" (力, Chikara); 133. "Breakthrough" (戦局打破, Senkyoku daha); 134. "The Winning Strategy" (作戦勝ち, Sakusen kachi); 135. "Withdrawal" (退転, Taiten); 136. "Chase" (追走, Tsuisō); 137. "Arrival" (現る, Arawaru); 138. "Night Raid" (夜襲, Yashū); 139. "Calamity" (天災, Tensai); 140. "Two vs. One" (二対一, Ni tai ichi)
14	June 19, 2009	978-4-08-877663-7	December 15, 2026	978-1-9747-6149-4
141. "Divine Skill" (神の業, Kami no gō); 142. "Nine Years Since" (九年ぶり, Kyū nen-buri); 143. "Hard To Grasp" (把握不能, Haaku funō); 144. "Defeatable" (倒せる, Taoseru); 145. "Team Attack Plan" (「集」の作戦, "Shū" no sakusen); 146. "Failure" (失敗, Shippai); 147. "The Bi Brothers" (尾兄弟, O kyōdai); 148. "Friend" (友, Tomo); 149. "Rallying" (再結集, Sai kesshū); 150. "Ouki's True Strength" (王騎の実力, Ōki no jitsuryoku); 151. "Moubu Approaches" (蒙武迫る, Mōbu semaru)
15	September 18, 2009	978-4-08-877715-3	January 19, 2027	978-1-9747-6150-0
152. "Trap" (罠, Wana); 153. "Flag" (旗, Hata); 154. "Moubu Falls for The Trap" (蒙武掛かる, Mōbu kakaru); 155. "Northern Army" (北の軍, Kita no gun); 156. "Arrival" (到着, Tōchaku); 157. "Raising Morale" (士気高揚, Shiki kōyō); 158. "Star of the Show" (真打ち, Shin'uchi); 159. "Prediction" (予想, Yosō); 160. "Commanders" (総大将見える, Sō taishō mieru); 161. "Individual Might" (個人の武, Kojin no bu); 162. "Kyou's True Identity" (摎の正体, Kyō no shōtai)
16	December 18, 2009	978-4-08-877771-9	February 16, 2027	978-1-9747-7003-8
163. "Kyou's Secret" (摎の秘密, Kyō no himitsu); 164. "Chance Meeting" (邂逅, Kaikō); 165. "Source of Strength" (強さの根源, Tsuyo-sa no kongen); 166. "Like Oil & Water" (相容れず, Ai irezu); 167. "Qin's Military Prestige" (秦の武威, Qín no bui); 168. "A New Era" (新たな時代, Arata na jidai); 169. "Border of Death" (死線, Shisen); 170. "Great General of the Heavens" (天下の大将軍, Tenka no Taishōgun); 171. "A General's View" (将軍の景色, Shōgun no keshiki); 172. "Inheritance" (継承, Keishō); 173. "Battle's End" (終戦, Shūsen)
17	March 19, 2010	978-4-08-877819-8	—	—
174. "Three Hundred-Man Commander" (三百人将, Sanbyaku-nin shō); 175. "Riboku, Kanyou Bound" (李牧､咸陽へ, Riboku, Kan'yō e); 176. "Proposition" (提案, Teian); 177. "Negotiation" (交渉, Kōshō); 178. "Celebratory Banquet" (祝宴, Shukuen); 179. "Five Years" (五年, Go nen); 180. "Preliminary Battles" (前哨戦, Zenshō-sen); 181. "Ant" (蟻, Ari); 182. "Outsmart" (出し抜く, Dashinuku); 183. "Third Faction" (第三勢力, Dai san seiryoku); 184. "Queen Mother" (太后, Taigō)
18	June 18, 2010	978-4-08-877873-0	—	—
185. "Mother and Son" (母子, Boshi); 186. "Vestige of Beauty" (美姫の面影, Biki no omokage); 187. "Kou, Conveys" (向､伝える, Kō, tsutaeru); 188. "Backing the Dark Horse" (希貨置くべし, Ki ka okubeshi); 189. "Assemble" (揃い踏み, Soroibumi); 190. "Siege" (攻城, Kōjō); 191. "Gyoku Hou's Might" (玉鳳の武, Gyoku Hō no bu); 192. "The Reality of Invasion" (侵略の現実, Shinrya ku no genjitsu); 193. "My Way" (俺のやり方, Ore no yari kata); 194. "The Man Known as Renpa" (その男､廉頗, Sono otoko, Renpa); 195. "Night at Kinrikan" (近利関の夜, Kinrikan no yoru)
19	August 19, 2010	978-4-08-879015-2	—	—
196. "Flying Spear" (飛槍, Hi yari); 197. "Air of a General" (武将の空気, Bushō no kūki); 198. "Ouki and Renpa" (王騎と廉頗, Ōki to Renpa); 199. "A Strange Habit" (不思議な癖, Fushigi na kuse); 200. "1000-Man Commander" (千人将, Sen-nin shō); 201. "Shin's Voice" (信の声, Shin no koe); 202. "Announcement" (告げる, Tsugeru); 203. "Embrace" (抱擁, Hōyō); 204. "Hastily Assembled Unit" (急造部隊, Kyūzō butai); 205. "Killer Spear Technique" (必殺の槍術, Hissatsu no sōjutsu); 206. "The Hi Shin Unit's Battle Plan" (飛信隊の作戦, Hi Shin-tai no sakusen)
20	November 19, 2010	978-4-08-879057-2	—	—
207. "Genbou Joins the Fray" (玄峰、参戦, Genpō, sansen); 208. "Enemy Command Squad's Location" (敵本陣の場所, Teki honjin no basho); 209. "Genbou Dominates" (玄峰、翻弄, Genpō, honrō); 210. "Led by the Nose" (手玉, Tedama); 211. "Vice-Generals Begin to Move" (副将、動く, Fukushō, ugoku); 212. "Villain" (曲者, Kusemono); 213. "Mouten's Proposal" (蒙恬の提案, Mōten no teian); 214. "Cooperative Battle" (共闘, Kyōtō); 215. "Rinko's Soldiers" (輪虎兵, Wa tora hei); 216. "Closing In" (肉薄, Nikuhaku); 217. "Shin, In One Breath" (信、一気呵成, Shin, ikki kasei)
21	February 18, 2011	978-4-08-879101-2	—	—
218. "Heki's Unit" (壁隊, Heki tai); 219. "Overcome" (越える, Koeru); 220. "Heki, Confused" (壁、惑う, Heki, madou); 221. "Underneath the Underneath" (裏の裏, Ura no ura); 222. "General's Calibre" (将器, Shōki); 223. "Lull" (欠落, Ketsuraku); 224. "The Final Morning" (最後の朝, Saigo no asa); 225. "Rindou" (輪動, Rindō); 226. "Banter" (おちょくり, Ochokuri); 227. "Long Years of Consideration" (長年の考え, Naganen no kangae); 228. "Planning Time" (練る時間, Neru jikan)
22	May 19, 2011	978-4-08-879141-8	—	—
229. "Contest of Wits" (知恵比べ, Chie kurabe); 230. "An Instant" (刹那, Setsuna); 231. "Will of the Heavens" (天の計らい, Ten no hakarai); 232. "Lone Struggle" (孤軍奮闘, Kogun funtō); 233. "Precious Comrade" (大事な仲間, Daiji na nakama); 234. "Final Stretch in One Push" (頂上一気, Chōjō ikki); 235. "Passion" (熱きもの, Netsu kimono); 236. "Renpa's Fury" (廉頗の怒り, Renpa no ikari); 237. "That Era" (あの時代, Ano jidai); 238. "Selfishly" (自分勝手に, Jibun katte ni); 239. "Surprisingly" (意外な言葉, Igai na kotoba)
23	August 19, 2011	978-4-08-879184-5	—	—
240. "Checkmate" (詰み, Tsumi); 241. "One and Only" (唯一つ, Tada hito-tsu); 242. "Sending Off" (見送り, Miokuri); 243. "Reward of Service" (論功行賞, Ronkō kōshō); 244. "Shin's Battle Plan" (信の作戦, Shin no sakusen); 245. "Arrival of the Strategist" (軍師の到着, Gunshi no tōchaku); 246. "Ten's Resolve" (貂の覚悟, Ten no kakugo); 247. "Strategist's First Battle" (軍師の初陣, Gunshi no uijin); 248. "One Step Ahead" (上を行く, Ue o iku); 249. "The Hi Shi Unit's Strategist" (飛信隊軍師, Hishin-tai gunshi); 250. "Tougun" (東郡, Tōgun)
24	November 18, 2011	978-4-08-879223-1	—	—
251. "General of Yan" (燕の将軍, Yàn no shōgun); 252. "Gekishin's Battle" (劇辛の戦, Gekishin no ikusa); 253. "Meaningless Battle" (下らぬ戦, Kudaranu ikusa); 254. "Chu's Young Generation" (楚の同世代, Chǔ no dō sedai); 255. "Chancellor of State" (相国, Shōkoku); 256. "Chancellor of the Left" (左丞相, Hidari jōshō); 257. "Small Kingdom" (小国, Shōkoku); 258. "Jo's Livehood" (徐の生業, Jo no seigyō); 259. "Chu & Zhao" (楚趙, Chǔ Zhào); 260. "A Warrior's Body" (武人の肉体, Bujin no nikutai); 261. "Signs of a Storm" (嵐の兆し, Arashi no kizashi)
25	February 17, 2012	978-4-08-879268-2	—	—
262. "Superstate's Invasion" (超大国の侵攻, Chō taikoku no shinkō); 263. "Unimaginable" (想像の埒外, Sōzō no rachigai); 264. "Encroaching Coalition Army" (迫り来る合従軍, Semarikuru gasshō gun); 265. "Diplomacy's Job" (外交の仕事, Gaikō no shigoto); 266. "Child of Fate" (因縁の子, Innen no ko); 267. "Check mate on the board" (詰んだ盤面, Tsunda banmen); 268. "Assembling the Party" (一堂に会す, Ichidō ni kaisu); 269. "Four Lords of the Warring States" (戦国四君, Sengoku yon-kun); 270. "Gathering at Kankoku Pass" (函谷関終結, Kanko-zeki shūketsu); 271. "Battle's Trigger" (開戦の口火, Kaisen no kuchibi); 272. "Duke Hyou's Rush" (麃公突貫, Hyō kō tokkan)
26	May 18, 2012	978-4-08-879330-6	—	—
273. "Commander of the Zhao Army" (趙軍の指揮官, Zhào gun no shiki-kan); 274. "Spider's Nest" (蜘蛛の巣, Kumo no su); 275. "Instinctual Talent" (本能型の才, Honnō-gata no sai); 276. "Houmei's Hand" (鳳明の手, Hōmei no te); 277. "Kanki, Confronts" (桓騎、向かい合う, Kanki, mukaiau); 278. "Father & Son" (父子の情, Fushi no jō); 279. "Mouten's Sword" (蒙恬の剣, Mōten no ken); 280. "Officers Quality" (部隊長の質, Butai-chō no shitsu); 281. "Bakuya Sword" (莫邪刀, Bakuya-tō); 282. "The Man Recognised by Ouki" (王騎が認めた男, Ōki ga mitometa otoko); 283. "Each One's Pride" (互いの自負, Tagai no jifu)
27	August 17, 2012	978-4-08-879390-0	—	—
284. "Incarnation of a Curse" (呪いそのもの, Noroi sono mono); 285. "Barrens Littered with Holes" (穴だらけの荒野, Ana-darake no kōya); 286. "No Answer" (答えのない, Kotae no nai); 287. "All of Humanity" (人間全て, Ningen subete); 288. "First Day's Report" (初日の報告, Shonichi no hōkoku); 289. "To Evolve" (化けてみせろ, Bakete misero); 290. "Heroic Woman, Karin" (女傑・媧燐, Joketsu Karin); 291. "Stalemate" (膠着, Kōchaku); 292. "Han's Weapons" (韓の兵器, Kan no heiki); 293. "Short Decisive Battle" (短期戦, Tanki-sen); 294. "Moubu's Speech" (蒙武の檄, Mōbu no geki)
28	November 19, 2012	978-4-08-879455-6	—	—
295. "A New Form" (新たな姿, Arata na sugata); 296. "The 2nd Army Moves" (第二軍動く, Dai ni gun ugoku); 297. "The Purpose of War Elephants" (戦象の意味, Ikusa zō no imi); 298. "Singled Out During A Crisis" (窮地の大抜擢, Kyūchi no dai batteki); 299. "A New Approach" (新たな攻略手, Arata na kōrya ku-shu); 300. "Danger of Falling" (陥落の危機, Kanraku no kiki); 301. "Sea of Enemies" (敵の海原, Teki no unabara); 302. "Resolve of No Return" (戻らぬ覚悟, Modoranu kakugo); 303. "General's Pride" (武将の矜持, Bushō no kyōji); 304. "Shin's Bright Idea" (信の閃き, Shin no hirameki); 305. "Ousen's Movements" (王翦の動き, Ōsen no ugoki)
29	February 19, 2013	978-4-08-879521-8	—	—
306. "Afternoon of the 15th Day" (十五日目の午後, Jū go nichi-me no gogo); 307. "5000-Man Commander Kouyoku" (五千将・項翼, Gosen shō Kōyoku); 308. "Karin Army's Assault" (媧燐軍の突撃, Karin gun no totsugeki); 309. "The Path to Kanmei" (汗明への道, Ase mei e no dō); 310. "The Strongest" (至強, Itari kyō); 311. "Unveiled Service Record" (明かされる戦歴, Akasareru senreki); 312. "The First Time In His Life" (生まれて初めて, Umarete hajimete); 313. "The Strongest Man" (最強の漢, Saikyō no otoko); 314. "Deciding the Strongest" (至強決す, Itari-kyō kessu); 315. "My Son" (俺の倅, Ore no segare); 316. "Victory Is Right Before Us" (勝利は目前, Shōri wa mokuzen)
30	April 4, 2013	978-4-08-879560-7	—	—
317. "Inside Kankoku Pass" (函谷関の裏, Kankoku-zeki no ura); 318. "Show's Over" (打ち止め, Uchidome); 319. "Chu King's Fury" (楚王の怒り, Chǔ ō no ikari); 320. "Whereabouts of the Mastermind" (首謀者の行方, Shubō-sha no yukue); 321. "Dire Situation" (渋い状況, Shibui jōkyō); 322. "Hyou & Hi" (麃と飛, Hyō to Hi); 323. "Epitome of the Instinctual Type" (本能型の極み, Honnō-gata no kiwami); 324. "Gigantic Buffoon" (ど阿呆, Do ahō); 325. "Forward" (前進, Zenshin); 326. "Delicious Wine" (うまい酒, Umai sake); 327. "Sei's Decision" (政の決断, Sei no ketsudan)
31	July 19, 2013	978-4-08-879609-3	—	—
328. "The Vacated Throne" (空いた玉座, Aita gyokuza); 329. "Borrowing A Shoulder to Lean On" (肩を借りる, Kata o kariru); 330. "Sei, Addresses" (政、語りかける, Sei, katarikakeru); 331. "Sai Readies Itself" (蕞、準備する, Sai, junbi suru); 332. "Announcement for Sai" (蕞に告ぐ, Sai ni tsugu); 333. "The Eastern Wall" (東壁, Tōheki); 334. "Sai, Fighting On Bravely" (奮戦する蕞, Funsen suru Sai); 335. "The First Night" (最初の夜, Saisho no yoru); 336. "Futei, Takes Action Lively" (傅抵、躍動す, Fūtei, yakudō su); 337. "The Man who will become one of the Three Heavens" (三大天となる男, San dai ten to naru otoko); 338. "The Conflicting Duo" (葛藤する二人, Kattō suru futari)
32	October 18, 2013	978-4-08-879681-9	—	—
339. "Touring Night" (巡回の夜, Junkai no yoru); 340. "An Unexpected Development" (予想外の変化, Yosō-gai no henka); 341. "Secret Exposed" (秘密の露見, Himitsu no roken); 342. "Shoubunkun's Proposal" (昌文君の提案, Shōbun-kun no teian); 343. "Sixth Day's Rally" (六日目の檄, Mui-ka-me no geki); 344. "Using Up Everything" (出し尽くす, Dashi tsukusu); 345. "Opened City Gates" (開く城門, Hiraku jōmon); 346. "Unexpected Reinforcements" (来ぬはずの援軍, Kinu hazu no engun); 347. "Overpowering! Reinforcements" (破格の加勢, Hakaku no kasei); 348. "Reason For Going" (行く理由, Iku riyū); 349. "Light" (軽い, Karui)
33	January 17, 2014	978-4-08-879736-6	—	—
350. "Flash" (紫電一閃, Shiden issen); 351. "Riboku's Decision" (李牧の決断, Riboku no ketsudan); 352. "Repelled" (不抜, Fubatsu); 353. "Sincere Gratitude" (深謝, Shinsha); 354. "Coalition Army's Settlement" (合従軍の顛末, Gasshō gun no tenmatsu); 355. "Exceptional Service" (特別功, Tokubetsu kō); 356. "3000-Man Unit" (三千人隊, Sanzen-nin-tai); 357. "Runaway" (脱走者, Dassō-sha); 358. "Encircling Yuu Tribe" (囲む幽族, Kakomu Yū-zoku); 359. "Difference in Dances" (巫舞の違い, Kannagi Mai no chigai); 360. "True Strength of the Pinnacle" (頂上の実力, Chōjō no jitsuryoku)
34	April 18, 2014	978-4-08-879782-3	—	—
361. "Reason For Changing" (変ずる理由, Henzuru riyū); 362. "Antithesis" (対極の力, Taikyoku no chikara); 363. "A Different Path" (別の道, Betsu no dō); 364. "Two Goals" (二つの目標, Futa-tsu no mokuhyō); 365. "Hakurou's Words" (白老の言葉, Hakurō no kotoba); 366. "The Various States After the War" (戦後の各国, Sengo no kakkoku); 367. "The Chancellor of the State's Thoughts" (相国の肚, Shōkoku no hara); 368. "The Brothers, Now" (兄弟の今, Kyōdai no ima); 369. "Signs of a Conspiracy" (企ての臭い, Kuwadate no nioi); 370. "Disturbing Shadows" (不穏な影, Fuon na kage); 371. "Tonryuu's Change" (屯留の異変, Tonryū no ihen)
35	July 18, 2014	978-4-08-879867-7	—	—
372. "The Subjugation Army Sets Out (討伐軍出陣, Tōbatsu gun shutsujin); 373. "Great Growth" (大いなる成長, Ōinaru seichō); 374. "The Siege of Tonryuu City" (屯留攻城戦, Tonryū kōjō-sen); 375. "Jailbreak" (脱獄, Datsugoku); 376. "Corridor" (曲廊, Kyoku rō); 377. "Sword and Shield" (剣と盾, Ken to tate); 378. "Justice" (正義, Seigi); 379. "A New Strategical Front" (新たな要所, Arata na yōsho); 380. "Personal Feelings and Strategy" (私情と戦略, Shijō to senrya ku); 381. "Old Fashioned Person" (古い人間, Furui ningen); 382. "The Wei Fire Dragons" (魏火龍, Wèi karyū)
36	October 17, 2014	978-4-08-890027-8	—	—
383. "Call Out" (呼びかけ, Yobikake); 384. "Behind The Duel" (一騎討ちの裏, Ikki uchi no ura); 385. "Internal Discord" (仲間割れ, Nakama ware); 386. "Ten's Existence" (貂の存在, Ten no sonzai); 387. "Exchange" (交換, Kōkan); 388. "The New Gyoku Hou Unit" (新生玉鳳隊, Shinsei Gyoku Hō-tai); 389. "The Name of Shihaku" (紫伯の名, Shihaku no na); 390. "The History of Infighting" (同士討ちの過去, Dōshi uchi no kako); 391. "Loss" (喪失, Sōshitsu); 392. "China's Attention" (中華の注目, Chūka no chūmoku); 393. "Third Day of Choyou" (著雍三日目, Choyō mikka-me)
37	January 19, 2015	978-4-08-890098-8	—	—
394. "Spectator" (見物, Kenbutsu); 395. "Ouhon's Duty" (王賁の責務, Ōhon no sekimu); 396. "Days Upon Days of Training" (修練の日々, Shūren no hibi); 397. "Onwards to the headquarters" (本陣へ, Honjin e); 398. "Reason for not Fighting" (戦わぬ訳, Tatakawanu wake); 399. "Close In" (肉迫す, Nikuhaku su); 400. "Fall and Retreat" (陥落と退避, Kanraku to taihi); 401. "The Warring States From Now On" (これからの戦国, Kore kara no sengoku); 402. "Activity at Kanyou" (咸陽の動き, Kanyō no ugoki); 403. "The Queen Mother's Goal" (太后の狙い, Taigō no nerai); 404. "Lüshi Chunqui" (呂氏春秋あらすじ, Lǚshì Chūnqiū arasuji)
38	April 17, 2015	978-4-08-890141-1	—	—
405. "A New State" (新しい国, Atarashī kuni); 406. "Parting Of Ways" (別れ, Wakare); 407. "5000-Man Commander" (五千人将, Gosen-nin shō); 408. "The Decisive Year" (決着の年, Kecchaku no nen); 409. "The Man Who Was Nothing" (何もない男, Nan mo nai otoko); 410. "Choose One of Two" (二つに一つ, Futatsu ni hitotsu); 411. "Gathered at You" (雍に舞う, Yō ni mau); 412. "Coming of Age Ceremony" (加冠の儀, Kakan no gi); 413. "Voice of the Ancestral Spirits" (祖霊の声, Sorei no koe); 414. "Three Sides, None Backing Down" (三方ゆずらず, San kata yuzurazu); 415. "How to Create Rebel Soldiers" (反乱兵の作り方, Hanran hei no tsukuri kata)
39	July 17, 2015	978-4-08-890230-2	—	—
416. "Where the Ambushers Lie" (伏兵の場所, Fukuhei no basho); 417. "River Crossing Battle" (渡河の戦い, Toka no tatakai); 418. "First Experience" (初体験の只中, Hatsu taiken no tadanaka); 419. "The Man who Stands" (立つ男, Tatsu otoko); 420. "Parting Ways" (袂を分かつ, Tamoto o wakatsu); 421. "Repeat of Failure" (二の舞, Ninomai); 422. "The Life to be Protected at All Cost" (守り抜く命, Mamorinuku inochi); 423. "The Origin Of The World" (天下の起源, Tenka no kigen); 424. "Kingdom of Fantasy" (夢の国, Yume no kuni); 425. "Normal Emotions" (正しい感情, Tadashī kanjō); 426. "Man's True Nature" (人の本質, Hito no honshitsu)
40	October 19, 2015	978-4-08-890277-7	—	—
427. "Words of Resolve" (決意の言葉, Ketsui no kotoba); 428. "Running for your Life" (命懸けの逃避, Inochigake no tōhi); 429. "A Commander's Popularity" (将の人望, Shō no jinbō); 430. "The Trumpet Call of Salvation" (救世の音色, Kyūsei no onshoku); 431. "The Turnabout Assault" (逆転の猛進, Gyakuten no mōshin); 432. "The Decisive Dusk" (決着の夕暮れ, Kecchaku no yūgure); 433. "Collapse of the Plot" (謀略の崩壊, Bōrya ku no hōkai); 434. "Star of Defeat" (敗北の巨星, Haiboku no kyosei); 435. "The Coup's Finale" (内乱の終着点, Nairan no shūchaku ten); 436. "Last Plea" (最後の懇願, Saigo no kongan); 437. "The Bond Between Parent and Child" (親子の繋がり, Oyako no tsunagari)
41	January 19, 2016	978-4-08-890347-7	—	—
438. "Hour of Conquest" (雄飛の刻, Yūhi no koku); 439. "Whereabouts of the Six Generals" (六将の行方, Roku shō no yukue); 440. "Mastermind of the Assassination" (暗殺の首謀者, Ansatsu no shubō-sha); 441. "The Position of Prime Minister" (宰相の席, Saishō no seki); 442. "Kindred Spirits" (似た者同士, Nita mono-dōshi); 443. "The Monsters Set Off" (化物達の出陣, Bakemono-tachi no shutsujin); 444. "Conquering a Cityless Landscape" (城無き占領, Shiro naki senryō); 445. "What Lies at the End of Deceit" (翻弄の末に, Honrō no sue ni); 446. "Unexpected Strategy" (意表をつく策, Ihyō o tsuku saku); 447. "The Commander Sets Out" (総大将動く, Sō taishō ugoku); 448. "The Battlefield's Stench" (戦場の匂い, Senjō no nioi)
42	April 19, 2016	978-4-08-890396-5	—	—
449. "Spider's Trap" (蜘蛛の罠, Kumo no wana); 450. "Bandit's Pride" (野党の意地, Yatō no iji); 451. "Night In Kokuyou" (黒羊の夜, Kokuyō no yoru); 452. "Results of the Attack" (強襲の成否, Kyōshū no seihi); 453. "Where the Advance Ends" (進軍の終着地, Shingun no shūchaku chi); 454. "A Strategist's Potential" (軍師の底力, Gunshi no sokojikara); 455. "Disguised Attack" (主攻なる助攻, Shu kō naru jo kō); 456. "Responsibility" (副長の責任, Fukuchō no sekinin); 457. "Tenacious Crossing" (執念の渡河, Shūnen no toka); 458. "Banner of Rigan" (離眼の御印, Rigan no go in); 459. "Contagious Fighting Spirit" (闘志の伝染, Tōshi no densen)
43	July 19, 2016	978-4-08-890471-9	—	—
460. "The Hi Shin Unit's Lynchpin" (飛信隊の楔, Hishin-tai no kusabi); 461. "Decisive Clash of Kokuyou" (黒羊の大一番, Kokuyō no ō ichi ban); 462. "Puzzling Night" (困惑の夜, Konwaku no yoru); 463. "Tragedy of Rigan" (離眼の悲劇, Rigan no higeki); 464. "Limits of Patience" (焦れの限界, Asere no genkai); 465. "The Palmtop Battlefield" (掌上の戦場, Tenohira-jō no senjō); 466. "The Man who is in the same class as Riboku" (李牧級の男, Riboku-kyū no otoko); 467. "The Hunted's Point of View" (狩られる側の風景, Karareru gawa no fūkei); 468. "Lucky and Unlucky" ("吉"と"凶", Kichi to kyō); 469. "Instant" (一瞬の出来事, Isshun no dekigoto); 470. "My Back" (俺の背中, Ore no senaka)
44	October 19, 2016	978-4-08-890512-9	—	—
471. "Tenacious Pursuit" (執念の追撃戦, Shūnen no tsuigeki-sen); 472. "Hunter's Fall" (狩人の落日, Karyūdo no rakujitsu); 473. "Joyous Retreat" (歓喜の撤退, Kanki no tettai); 474. "Zhao Commander's Pivotal Juncture" (趙将の正念場, Zhào shō no shōnen-jō); 475. "After the Disturbance" (動揺のその先, Dōyō no sono saki); 476. "The Truth Behind the Smoke" (煙の真実, Kemuri no shinjitsu); 477. "Outroar of Pride" (矜持の咆哮, Kyōji no hōkō); 478. "Confrontation's End" (殴り込みの末, Nagurikomi no sue); 479. "Bihei's Cries" (尾平の叫び, Bihei no sakebi); 480. "Bihei & The Hi Shin Unit" (尾平と飛信隊, Bihei to Hishin-tai); 481. "A Horrendous Gift" (苛烈な贈物, Karetsu na okurimono)
45	January 19, 2017	978-4-08-890571-6	—	—
482. "Rigan & The State of Zhao" (離眼と趙国, Rigan to Zhào-koku); 483. "The Small Hours after a Victory" (勝敗の夜ふけ, Shōhai no yofuke); 484. "Departures" (それぞれの出発, Sorezore no shuppatsu); 485. "Mouten's News" (蒙恬の報せ, Mōten no shirase); 486. "Bureaucrat's Battle" (文官達の戦い, Bunkan-tachi no tatakai); 487. "Conference of the East and West Kings" (東西大王会談, Tōzai daiō kaidan); 488. "Qin King's Vision" (秦王の絵図, Qín ō no ezu); 489. "Saitaku's Pride" (蔡沢の矜持, Saitaku no kyōji); 490. "Discussion of Destiny" (宿命の舌戦, Shukumei no zessen); 491. "Qin's Obstacle" (秦の障壁, Qín no shōheki); 492. "Recruitment for Growth" (成長への募兵, Seichō e no bohei)
46	April 19, 2017	978-4-08-890622-5	—	—
493. "A Fresh Start" (再出発, Sai shuppatsu); 494. "Sage of the Underground Prison" (地下牢の賢人, Shika rō no kenjin); 495. "Appropriate Resolve" (相応の覚悟, Sōō no kakugo); 496. "Beginning of the Turbulence" (激動の起こり, Gekidō no okori); 497. "Intention Behind the Gathering" (集結の本意, Shūketsu no hon'i); 498. "Tension of a Large Army" (大軍勢の緊張, Taigun-zei no kinchō); 499. "Inherited Dream in Hand" (手にする想い, Te ni suru omoi); 500. "Soldiers on the Warpath" (進軍路の兵達, Shingun-ro no hei-tachi); 501. "Mutual Probing" (気運の探り合い, Kiun no saguriai); 502. "He Who Seizes The Initiative" (機先を制す者, Kisen o seisu mono); 503. "Birds of Urgent Tidings" (火急の鳥, Kakyū no tori)
47	July 19, 2017	978-4-08-890701-7	—	—
504. "Zhao's National Gate" (趙の国門, Zhào no kuni mon); 505. "Fever" (熱狂, Nekkyō); 506. "The Mountain People's Siege" (山の民の攻城戦, Yama no tami no kōjō-sen); 507. "Jin & Tan" (仁と淡, Jin to Tan); 508. "Sword of the Mountain Tribes" (山民族の剣, Sanmin-zoku no ken); 509. "Inheritor of the Glaive" (矛の継承者, Hoko no keishō-sha); 510. "The Greenhorns' Night" (新兵達の夜, Shinpei-tachi no yoru); 511. "Retsubi's Trap" (列尾の罠, Retsu o no wana); 512. "Gyou's True Identity" (鄴の正体, Gyō no shōtai); 513. "China's Predictions" (中華の予測, Chūka no yosoku); 514. "The Most Foolish of Plans" (愚策の極み, Gusaku no kiwami)
48	October 19, 2017	978-4-08-890759-8	—	—
515. "Refugees of the Small Cities" (小城の流民, Ogi no ryūmin); 516. "Weapon of Conquest" (陥落の武器, Kanraku no buki); 517. "Chipping One Another Down" (削り合い, Kezuriai); 518. "Battleground - Ryouyou" (戦地・橑陽, Senchi.Ryōyō); 519. "The Supreme Commanders' Methods" (総大将の流儀, Sō taishō no ryūgi); 520. "Battle's Beginning" (火蓋を切る, Hibuta o kiru); 521. "The Intricacies of Mobility" (機動の妙, Kidō no myō); 522. "The Left Wing's Despair" (左翼の絶望, Sayoku no zetsubō); 523. "Qin Right Wing's Moment" (秦軍右翼の刻, Qín gun uyoku no koku); 524. "Weight of Resolve" (覚悟の比重, Kakugo no hijū); 525. "Bananji's Passion" (馬南慈の気概, Bananji no kigai)
49	January 19, 2018	978-4-08-890839-7	—	—
526. "The Spear and the Iron Hammer" (槍と鉄槌, Yari to tettsui); 527. "Ryouyou's Fang" (橑陽の牙, Ryōyō no kiba); 528. "Descendants of Quanrong" (犬戎の末裔, Quǎnróng no matsuei); 529. "Tanwa's Bravery" (端和の勇, Tanwa no yū); 530. "Killing Stroke Detachment" (必殺の別動隊, Hissatsu no betsudō-tai); 531. "Turning Point" (潮目, Shiome); 532. "Shin's Blade" (信の刃, Shin no ha); 533. "Lost Morale" (失われた士気, Ushinawareta shiki); 534. "Until Sundown" (日没まで, Nichibotsu made); 535. "Insufficient Rank" (格不足, Kaku fusoku); 536. "A Second First Day" (二度目の初日, Ni do-me no shonichi)
50	April 19, 2018	978-4-08-890890-8	—	—
537. "A Great General's View" (大将軍の景色, Taishōgun no keshiki); 538. "Akakin" (亜花錦, Akakin); 539. "Opponent" (戦の相手, Ikusa no aite); 540. "Battle of Attrition" (消耗戦, Shōmō-sen); 541. "Prophesied Grounds" (予言の地, Yogen no chi); 542. "Nail" (楔, Kusabi); 543. "To the True Battleground" (主戦場へ, Shusen-jō e); 544. "Rookies' Battle" (新人戦, Shinjin-sen); 545. "Instinct" (直感, Chokkan); 546. "Ground of Flames" (大炎の地, Ō honō no chi); 547. "Glaive's Lament" (矛の嘆き, Hoko no nageki)
51	July 19, 2018	978-4-08-891071-0	—	—
548. "Mid-Battle Tactics" (乱戦下の策, Ransen-ka no saku); 549. "Three Miscalculations" (三つの誤算, Mittsu no gosan); 550. "News Of The Time Limit" (期限の知らせ, Kigen no shirase); 551. "Messenger's Report" (伝者の報告, Tsute-sha no hōkoku); 552. "Strategy of Sacrifice" (身を切る作戦, Mi o kiru sakusen); 553. "Luudin" (ルーディン, Rūdin); 554. "Offence and Defence of the Heki Army" (壁軍の攻防, Kabe gun no kōbō); 555. "Piecemeal Targeting" (個別撃破, Kobetsu gekiha); 556. "Ousen's Defence" (王翦の守り, Ōsen no mamori); 557. "Joint Destruction" (関節粉砕, Kansetsu funsai); 558. "Inhuman Might" (人外の武, Jingai no bu)
52	October 19, 2018	978-4-08-891116-8	—	—
559. "Right Wing's Outcome" (右翼の行方, Uyoku no yukue); 560. "Shin's Space" (信の間合い, Shin no maai); 561. "Impact of that Single Swing" (一刀の衝撃, Ichi-tō no shōgeki); 562. "Dread Commander" (恐将, Osore shō); 563. "Lord of the Tribe, Katari" (族長カタリ, Zokuchō Katari); 564. "Sundown" (落日, Rakujitsu); 565. "Upon the Front Lines" (前線にて, Zensen nite); 566. "Tanwa's Choice" (端和の選択, Tanwa no sentaku); 567. "Tomorrow's Sun" (明日の太陽, Asu no taiyō); 568. "The Strongest Warrior" (最強の戦士, Saikyō no senshi); 569. "Bajio's Oath" (バジオウの誓い, Bajiō no chikai)
53	January 18, 2019	978-4-08-891188-5	—	—
570. "The Perfect Encounter" (完璧なる遭遇, Kanpeki naru sōgū); 571. "Chance For Redemption" (挽回の機, Bankai no ki); 572. "Vengeance for Katari" (カタリの仇, Katari no ada); 573. "Those Who Go Forward" (立ち向かう者, Tachimukau mono); 574. "Liberators" (解放者, Kaihō-sha); 575. "Unreaching Orders" (届かない指示, Todokanai shiji); 576. "Ousen's Orders" (王翦の下知, Ōsen no geji); 577. "An Utter Stranger" (赤の他人, Aka no tanin); 578. "By Tomorrow" (明日までに, Asu made ni); 579. "Twelfth Morning" (十二日目の朝, Jū ni nichi-me no asa); 580. "The Strongest Moment" (最強の瞬間, Saikyō no shunkan)
54	April 19, 2019	978-4-08-891254-7	—	—
581. "The View Before You" (見える景色, Mieru keshiki); 582. "The Final Night" (最後の夜, Saigo no yoru); 583. "Thirteenth Day" (十三日目, Jū san nichi-me); 584. "A Few Dozen Cavalrymen" (数十騎, Sūjū ki); 585. "Raigoku" (雷獄, Raigoku); 586. "A Showdown of Two Thrusts" (二突きの勝負, Ni tsuki no shōbu); 587. "Only Prayers" (祈るのみ, Inoru nomi); 588. "Right Wing's Headquarter" (右翼の本営, Uyoku no hon'ei); 589. "Happenings of the Night" (夜の出来事, Yoru no dekigoto); 590. "All Out on Offense" (攻め偏重, Seme henchō); 591. "Three Great Heaven's Shield" (三大天の盾, San dai ten no tate)
55	August 19, 2019	978-4-08-891341-4	—	—
592. "A Place to Die" (死に場所, Shini basho); 593. "Zhao Ga Ryuu's Headquarters" (趙峩龍本陣, Zhào Ga Ryū honjin); 594. "Marker" (楔, Kusabi); 595. "The Best" (最高の隊, Saikō no tai); 596. "Defeat Chou Ga Ryuu" (趙峩龍を討て, Zhào Ga Ryū o ute); 597. "Good Luck" (武運を, Būn o); 598. "Woven" (紡ぐ者, Tsumugu mono); 599. "Right Wing's Scales" (右翼の風向き, Uyoku no kazamuki); 600. "Fourteenth Night" (十四日目の夜, Jū yon-ka-me no yoru); 601. "The Day of Climax" (決着の日, Kecchaku no hi); 602. "Riboku's Formation" (李僕の陣形, Riboku no jinkei)
56	November 19, 2019	978-4-08-891402-2	—	—
603. "The Change on Day Fifteen" (十五日目の異変, Jū go nichi-me no ihen); 604. "Riboku's Tactics" (李牧の戦術, Riboku no senjutsu); 605. "Ousen's Insight" (王翦の読み, Ōsen no yomi); 606. "Origin" (起こり, Okori); 607. "The Commander's Conversation" (総大将の対話, Sō taishō no taiwa); 608. "The Centre's Hope" (中央軍の勝ち目, Chūō gun no kachime); 609. "China's Swell" (中華のうねり, Chūka no uneri); 610. "Rin Shou Jo's Advice" (蘭相如の助言, Rin Sō Jo no jogen); 611. "Ousen's Advantages" (王翦の分, Ōsen no bun); 612. "He Who Holds The Answer" (答えを持つ者, Kotae o motsu mono); 613. "Certain Victory" (必勝戦略, Hisshō senrya ku)
57	March 19, 2020	978-4-08-891506-7	—	—
614. "Pincer Attack" (挟撃戦, Kyōgeki-sen); 615. "HQ in Danger" (本陣の危機, Honjin no kiki); 616. "Ousen's Path of Retreat" (王翦の退路, Ōsen no tairo); 617. "How to Stop the Hi Shin Unit" (飛信隊の止め方, Hishin-tai no tome kata); 618. "Reasons for Fighting" (戦場への思い, Senjō e no omoi); 619. "Riboku's HQ" (李牧本陣, Riboku honjin); 620. "Roar of a Bushin" (武神の咆哮, Bushin no hōkō); 621. "Caller" (堕とす者, Otosu mono); 622. "Houken" (龐煖とは, Hōken to wa); 623. "To Serve as an Example" (模を示す, Katagi o shimesu); 624. "Man's Representative" (人の代表, Hito no daihyō)
58	June 19, 2020	978-4-08-891599-9	—	—
625. "Contradiction's Answer" (矛盾の答え, Mujun no kotae); 626. "Merciless Reality" (残酷な現実, Zankoku na genjitsu); 627. "Where The Path Leads" (道の行方, Michi no yukue); 628. "Embers of Life" (命の火, Inochi no hi); 629. "Shin's Dream" (信の夢, Shin no yume); 630. "Gap Between Heaven and Earth" (天地の間, Tenchi no aida); 631. "The Red Stairway" (朱い階段, Akai kaidan); 632. "Rejoining The Fight" (再始動, Sai shidō); 633. "Two From Ten" (十の二, Jū no ni); 634. "Strategy Undone" (戦略の破綻, Senrya ku no hatan); 635. "Mountain of Treasure" (宝の山, Takara no yama)
59	September 18, 2020	978-4-08-891659-0	—	—
636. "Route of Resupply" (補給軍の行方, Hokyū gun no yukue); 637. "Gyou's Life" (鄴の命, Gyō no inochi); 638. "Waterway" (水路, Suiro); 639. "Good News" (吉報, Kippō); 640. "Nation's Keystone" (国の要, Kuni no yō); 641. "A Pressing Issue" (深刻な問題, Shinkoku na mondai); 642. "First Class Exemplary Reward" (第一等の特別功, Dai ichi tō no tokubetsu kō); 643. "Show of Resolve" (覚悟の通達, Kakugo no tsūtatsu); 644. "House of the Peach Spring" (桃泉殿, Momo izumidono); 645. "Zhao King's Decree" (趙王の命, Zhào ō no inochi); 646. "Not since Ganmon" (雁門以来, Ganmon irai)
60	December 18, 2020	978-4-08-891735-1	—	—
647. "Activity at Kanan" (河南の動き, Kanan no ugoki); 648. "The King's Problem" (大王の問題, Daiō no mondai); 649. "What Terms" (条件次第, Jōken shidai); 650. "Day of Battle" (開戦の日, Kaisen no hi); 651. "Reinforcements Arrive" (援軍来たる, Engun kitaru); 652. "Words from My Master" (主からの言葉, Nushi kara no kotoba); 653. "Stand Together" (共闘せよ, Kyōtō seyo); 654. "Not Chu" (楚にあらず, Chǔ ni arazu); 655. "New Tactics" (新たな戦術, Arata na senjutsu); 656. "I'm Interested" (興味がある, Kyōmi ga aru); 657. "The Meaning of Liberation" (解放の意味, Kaihō no imi)
61	April 19, 2021	978-4-08-891843-3	—	—
658. "Be Ready" (一つの覚悟, Hito-tsu no kakugo); 659. "Until We Meet Again" (次会う日まで, Tsugi au hi made); 660. "Good or Evil" (善か悪か, Zen ka waru ka); 661. "Advantageous" (利有り, Ri ari); 662. "Why we Fight" (苦戦の理由, Kusen no riyū); 663. "Rumors of Kyoukai" (羌瘣の噂, Kyōkai no uwasa); 664. "Little Sister" (妹分, Imōtobun); 665. "Rei's Purpose" (礼の目的, Rei no mokuteki); 666. "The Depths of Darkness" (闇の淵, Yami no fuchi); 667. "Three Days Later" (三日後, Mikka-go); 668. "Betrayal" (裏切り, Uragiri)
62	July 16, 2021	978-4-08-892030-6	—	—
669. "Shiki" (識, Shiki); 670. "Fatal Mistake" (致命的なこと, Chimei-teki na koto); 671. "Appointment Ceremony" (任命の儀, Ninmei no gi); 672. "Golden Wings" (黄金の翼, Ōgon no tsubasa); 673. "Uncertain Air" (漂う空気, Tadayou kūki); 674. "Invitation to a Harsh Terrain" (険地への誘い, Ken chi e no sasoi); 675. "Onward" (前へ, Mae e); 676. "Why We Thirst" (渇きの理由, Kawaki no riyū); 677. "The Hi Shin Unit's Assignment" (飛信隊の行方, Hishin-tai no yukue); 678. "Eikyuu" (影丘, Eikyū); 679. "A Plan of Attack" (攻略の糸口, Kōrya ku no itoguchi)
63	November 19, 2021	978-4-08-892129-7	—	—
680. "The Boss' Words" (お頭の伝言, O atama no dengon); 681. "Tenacity" (強靱な力, Kyōjin na chikara); 682. "The Struggle on the Cliffs" (崖上の闘争, Gaijō no tōsō); 683. "Family of Fools" (バカ親子, Baka oyako); 684. "Surprise Attack" (奇襲の別働隊, Kishū no betsudōtai); 685. "Hour of Reckoning" (断罪の時, Danzai no toki); 686. "Kanki's Objective" (恒騎の狙い, Kanki no nerai); 687. "Pain"痛み (Itami); 688. "A Match of Speed" (勤きの勝負, Tsutomoki no shōbu); 689. "The Height of Entertainment" (最大の娯楽, Saidai no goraku); 690. "According to Plan" (予定通り, Yotei-dōri)
64	February 18, 2022	978-4-08-892216-4	—	—
691. "The Number of Stoves" (竈の数, Kamado no kazu); 692. "The Third Group of Soldiers" (第三の兵, Dai san no hei); 693. "Pointless Discussion" (浅い話, Asai hanashi); 694. "War of Information" (情報戦, Jōhō-sen); 695. "The Chest" (箱, Hako); 696. "Rumors of Release" (解放の噂, Kaihō no uwasa); 697. "A General's Duty" (将軍の役目, Shōgun no yakume); 698. "The Reason for Massacre" (虐殺の理由, Gyakusatsu no riyū); 699. "The Number of Severed Heads" (首級の数, Shukyū no kazu); 700. "The Tension After the Battle" (戦後の軋み, Sengo no kishimi); 701. "The Commander-in-Chief's Return" (大将軍の帰還, Daishōgun no kikan)
65	June 17, 2022	978-4-08-892332-1	—	—
702. "A Sight to Behold" (驚くべきもの, Odorokubeki mono); 703. "Reversal Tactics" (逆手の大戦略, Gyakute no dai senryaku); 704. "Heading North" (北上開始, Hokujō kaishi); 705. "A Bloodcurdling Tactic" (李牧の敵を半分にする, Riboku no teki o hanbun ni suru); 706. "The Ko Chou Army's Spirit" (扈輒軍の精神, Ko chō-gun no seishin); 707. "An Undesirable Opponent" (乗らない相手, Noranai aite); 708. "How Far You Will Go for Revenge" (復讐心の度合い, Fukushū shin no doai); 709. "An Important Decision" (大きな選択, Ōkina sentaku); 710. "Worlds Apart" (世界の違い, Sekai no chigai); 711. "Subtle Numbers" (微妙な数, Bimyōna kazu); 712. "The Miraculous Advance" (奇跡の前進, Kiseki no zenshin); 713. "The Night Before the Decisive Battle" (決戦前夜, Kessen zen'ya)
66	September 16, 2022	978-4-08-892425-0	—	—
714. "The Power of Emotions" (思いを力に, Omoi o chikara ni); 715. "A Staged War" (描き切られた戦い, Kaki kira reta tatakai); 716. "A Way Out" (打開策の有無, Dakai-saku no umu); 717. "A Place to Fight Back" (優勢な場所, Yūseina basho); 718. "Combined Strength" (共闘の力, Kyōtō no chikara); 719. "The Drill Formation" (錐型の陣, Kiri-gata no jin); 720. "Orders from the Flag" (指示旗, Shiji hata); 721. "One's True Worth" (真骨頂, Shinkotchō); 722. "Acting as One" (前後の呼吸, Zengo no Kokyū); 723. "The Path of the Hi Shin Army" (飛信隊の道, Hishin-tai no Michi); 724. "The Four Battles" (李信は桓騎を見殺しにする, Hi Shin wa Kan Ki o Migoroshi ni Suru)
67	January 19, 2023	978-4-08-892568-4	—	—
725. "Strange Formation" (異様な陣形, Iyōna Jinkei); 726. "Somewhere We're Stronger" (強くなる場所, Tsuyoku Naru Basho); 727. "Kanki's Axe" (桓騎の鉞, Kan Ki to Masakari); 728. "The Oldest Member" (最古参, Saikozan); 729. "A Beautiful Child" (美しい子, Utsukushī Ko); 730. "Koushun" (紅春, Beni Haru); 731. "The Life-threatening Infantry Corps" (命懸けの歩兵団, Inochigake no Hohei-dan); 732. "The Techniques of the Saki" (砂鬼の術, Suna Oni no Jutsu); 733. "The Dispossessed" (奪われた者, Ubawareta Mono); 734. "How We Survive" (生き延びる手段, Ikinobiru Shudan); 735. "The Bastards in the Middle" (中間のやつら, Chūkan no Yatsura)
68	April 18, 2023	978-4-08-892738-1	—	—
736. "An Important Castle" (重要な城, Jūyō na Shiro); 737. "The Unity of the Zhao" (趙人の結束, Chō Hito no Kessoku); 738. "Kanki's Head" (桓騎の首, Kanki no Kubi); 739. "On The Castle Walls" (城壁の上, Jōheki no Ue); 740. "The Meaning of the End" (結末の意味, Ketsumatsu no Imi); 741. "The Final Gamble" (最後の博打, Saigo no Bakuchi); 742. "Riboku's Shield" (李牧の盾, Riboku no Tate); 743. "The Promise" (誓い, Chikai); 744. "Soldiers of Ganmon" (雁門兵, Ganmon Hei); 745. "The Deciding Moment" (決着の刻, Ketchaku no Koku); 746. "A Lacking Quality" (気持ちの戦い, Kimochi no Tatakai)
69	July 19, 2023	978-4-08-892747-3	—	—
747. "The Boss' Words" (お頭の伝言, O Atama no Dengon); 748. "Ogiko's Intuition" (オギコの勘, Ogiko no Kan); 749. "Family" (家族, Kazoku); 750. "Kanki the Beheader" (首斬り桓騎, Kubikiri Kanki); 751. "A One Second Difference" (一秒の差, Ichi-byō no Sa); 752. "To the Sanctuary" (聖地へ, Seichi e); 753. "The Rear" (最後尾, Saigō); 754. "A Moment to Rejoice" (享楽の刻, Kyōraku no Koku); 755. "Fated Day" (それぞれの進路, Sorezore no Shinro); 756. "The Next Strategy" (次の戦略, Tsugi no Senryaku); 757. "Capital of the Three Jins" (新鄭, Shintei)
70	November 17, 2023	978-4-08-892895-1	—	—
758. "Trickery and Deception" (化かし合い, Bakashi Ai); 759. "The Paradoxical King" (歪な国王, Ibitsuna Kokuō); 760. "The Constant" (変わらないもの, Kawaranai Mono); 761. "Battle of Information" (情報戦, Jōhōsen); 762. "An Ordinary Legalist" (普通の法家, Futsū no Hōka); 763. "Another Goal" (他の目的, Hoka no Mokuteki); 764. "The Hidden Monster" (怪物, Kaibutsu); 765. "Battle of Shadows" (暗い戦い, Kurai Tatakai); 766. "Fellow Student and Friend" (同門の友, Dōmon no Tomo); 767. "Jouto Village" (城戸村, Jōto Mura); 768. "Their Promise" (二人の約束, Futari no Yakusoku)
71	February 19, 2024	978-4-08-893119-7	—	—
769. "Hi Shin Unit, Reborn" (新生飛信隊, Shinsei Hisshin-tai); 770. "This Year's Military Might" (今年の軍力, Kotoshi no Gunryoku); 771. "War for Revenge" (雪辱戦, Setsujoku-sen); 772. "Good Fortune to All" (それぞれの武運, Sorezore no Buun); 773. "The Spark That Starts the Battle" (開戦の口火, Kaisen no Kuchibi); 774. "Beyond Their Predictions" (予想の上, Yosō no Ue); 775. "A Troublesome Existence" (厄介な存在, Yakkaina Sonzai); 776. "Tactlessness" (不器用なところ, Bukiyōna Tokoro); 777. "The Enemy Who Stands in Our Way" (立ちはだかる敵, Tachihadakaru Teki); 778. "A Feeling of Unease" (違和感の訳, Iwakan no Wake); 779. "Obstacle Incarnate" (障壁となる男, Shōheki to Naru Otoko)
72	May 17, 2024	978-4-08-893237-8	—	—
780. "Offense and Defense in the Central Army" (中央軍の攻防, Chūō-gun no Kōbō); 781. "Two Great Additions" (二傑の加勢, Ni Suguru no Kasei); 782. "General's Path" (総大将の進路, Sōdaishō no Shinro); 783. "A Childish Play" (子供じみた手, Kodomo Jimita-te); 784. "The Power of Songs" (青歌の強さ, Ao Uta no Tsuyosa); 785. "Big Woman" (大女, Dai On'na); 786. "The Necessity of Resolve" (覚悟の必要, Kakugo no Hitsuyō); 787. "The Wolf Blood Oath" (狼血の契り, Ōkami Chi no Chigiri); 788. "Ousen's Expectations" (王翦の想定, Ōsen no Sōtei); 789. "The Final Wall" (最後の壁, Saigo no Kabe); 790. "The Blood of Seika" (青歌の血, Ao Uta no Chi)
73	September 19, 2024	978-4-08-893381-8	—	—
791. "Other People's Wars" (他人の戦争, Tanin no Sensō); 792. "Evacuation Detail" (脱出の責任, Dasshutsu no Sekinin); 793. "A True Rearguard" (本物の殿, Honmono no Tono); 794. "Leaving The Roots Intact" (根を残す, Ne o Nokosu); 795. "For the Sake of Victory" (勝つために, Katsu Tame ni); 796. "A Glimmer of Hope" (一縷の望み, Ichiru no Nozomi); 797. "Crumbling Away" (砕け散る, Kudake Chiru); 798. "The Woman I Love" (愛する女, Aisuru On'na); 799. "The Cycle of War" (戦争の輪, Sensō no wa); 800. "The Three Pillars" (三つの柱, Mittsu no Hashira); 801. "The Second Pillar" (二つ目の柱, Futatsu-me no Hashira)
74	December 18, 2024	978-4-08-893478-5	—	—
802. "The Army of a Great General" (大将軍の軍勢, Daishōgun no Gunzei); 803. "The Third Pillar" (三本目の柱, Mitsumoto-me no Hashira); 804. "The Unusual New Force" (異様な新兵群, Iyōna Shinpei-gun); 805. "The Unusual New Force" (電光石火, Denkōsekka); 806. "Three Choices" (三つの選択, Mittsu no Sentaku); 807. "Nanyou Castle" (南陽城, Nan'yō Shiro); 808. "Flag" (旗, Hata); 809. "The Responsibility of the Six Great General" (六将の責任, Roku shō no Sekinin); 810. "Citizens of Nanyou" (南陽の民, Nan'yō no min); 811. "The Blade's Meaning" (刃の意味, Ha no imi); 812. "Under the Law" (法の下に, Hō no Shita ni)
75	March 18, 2025	978-4-08-893616-1	—	—
813. "Nanyou Situation" (南陽の姿, Nan'yō no Sugata); 814. "Qin's Envoys" (秦の使者, Hata no Shisha); 815. "The Other Kingdoms' Focus" (列国の注目, Rekkoku no Chūmoku); 816. "The Vice-Commander's Words of Encouragement" (副将の檄, Fukushō no Geki); 817. "Breaking the Deadlock" (拮抗を崩す, Kikkō o Kuzusu); 818. "Tou at the Rear" (最後尾の騰, Saigo no Tō); 819. "Discussion at the Battleground" (戦地の会談, Senchi no Kaidan); 820. "Tou's Words" (騰の話, Noboru no Hanashi); 821. "The Monstrously Strong War" (怪力の戦士, Kairiki no Senshi); 822. "Malefics for Wei and Zhao" (魏趙の凶星, Gichō no Kyōsei); 823. "The World That Raku'A Kan Sees" (洛亜完の視界, Rakuakan no Shikai)
76	July 17, 2025	978-4-08-893737-3	—	—
824. "Duties" (役割, Yakuwari); 825. "The Stones of Nanyou" (南陽石, Nan'yō Ishi); 826. "A Difference In Quality" (質の差, Shitsu no sa); 827. "The Presence of Inheritance" (遺産の存在, Isan no Sonzai); 828. "The Outstanding Men of the Tou Army" (騰軍の傑物, Tōgun no Kettsumono); 829. "A Hero's Name" (英雄の名, Eiyū no na); 830. "Mayhem in Shintei" (新鄭の混乱, Shin Tei no Konran); 831. "The State of the Battle of Tousa" (東砂の戦況, Higashisuna no Senkyō); 832. "Fierce Battle in Tousa" (東砂の激戦, Higashisuna no Gekisen); 833. "Important Advice" (重要な進言, Jūyōna Shingen); 834. "Han Army's Morale" (韓軍の士気, Kangun no Shiki)
77	October 17, 2025	978-4-08-893834-9	—	—
835. "An Ordinary Man" (ふつうの人, Futsū no Hito); 836. "The Duties of Royalty" (王族の役目, Ōzoku no Yakume); 837. "East Dragon's Bell" (東龍の鐘, Tōryū no Kane); 838. "Enter the Castle" (入城, Nyūjō); 839. "Treason" (反逆行為, Hangyaku Kōi); 840. "Abdication" (譲渡, Jōto); 841. "Large Distortion" (大きな歪み, Ōkina Yugami); 842. "The Weight of the Burden" (業の重さ, Gō no Omosa); 843. "The Colossal Rule of Law Nation" (巨大法治国家, Kyodai Hōchi Kokka); 844. "The General Who Surpassed Imagination" (想像を超えた武将, Sōzō o Koeta Bushō); 845. "The Atsuyo Army" (関与の軍勢, Kanyo no Gunzei)
78	January 19, 2026	978-4-08-894057-1	—	—
846. "The Name I Wanted to Give" (つけたい名前, Tsuketai Namae); 847. "Ultimate Formation" (最強布陣, Saikyō Fujin); 848. "A King's Deamanor" (王の姿, Ō no Sugata); 849. "The Vow" (契り, Chigiri); 850. "The Main Force" (主戦力, Shusenryoku); 851. "Full-Scale Assault" (全面攻擊, Zenmen Kōgeki); 852. "Deployment Complete" (展開完了, Tenkai Kanryō); 853. "The Beast's Roar" (獣の叫び, Kemono no Sakebi); 854. "A Simultaneous Outbreak of War" (一斉開戦, Issei Kaisen); 855. "The Merciless Arrow" (慈悲なき弓矢, Jihi naki Yumiya); 856. "Deadly Assassin" (必殺の刺客, Hissatsu no Shikaku)
79	May 19, 2026	978-4-08-894196-7	—	—
857. "A Highly Honorable Foe" (誉れ高き敵, Homare Takaki Teki); 858. "A Battlefield With No End" (結末なき戦場, Ketsumatsu naki Senjō); 859. "Non-Existent Arrow" (存在しない矢, Sonzai Shinai Ya); 860. "A Challenge to the Ten Bows" (十号への挑戦, Jūgō e no Chōsen); 861. "The Bow's Destination" (弓の終着地, Yumi no Shūchakuchi); 862. "The Ultimate Arrow" (究極の矢, Kyūkyoku no Ya); 863. "The Arrow That Flies Forever" (飛び続ける矢, Tobitsudzukeru Ya); 864. "Offense and Defense of The North" (北の攻防, Kita no Kōbō); 865. "King of the Stateless Area" (無国籍地帯の王, Mukokuseki Chitai no Ō); 866. "A Double-Edged Sword" (諸刃の策, Morohā no Saku); 867. "The Fateful North" (因縁の北部, Innen no Hokubu)
80	August 19, 2026	978-4-08-894267-4	—	—
868. "Lessons from Dai" (代の教訓, Dai no Kyōkun); 869. "The Air of a Great General" (大将軍の風格, Daishōgun no Fūkaku); 870. "The Grand Strategy" (大きな戦略, Ōkina Senryaku); 871. "Allies' Self-Sacrifice" (友軍の献身, Yūgun no Kenshin); 872. "Something Reprehensible" (よからぬこと, Yokaranu Koto); 873. "All of China Will Know" (中華全土が知る, Chūka Zendo ga Shiru); 874. "The Third Army" (三番目の重, Sanbanme no Omo); 875. "Deeper and Deeper" (奥深く, Okufukaku); 876. "The Siege of Kantan" (邸郭攻城戦, Teikaku Kōjōsen); 877. "The Enemy's Main Force" (敵の本陣, Teki no Honjin); 878. "The Same Situation" (同じ形, Onaji Katachi)
81	November 18, 2026	978-4-08-894449-4	—	—
879. "The Only Flaw" (唯一の欠点, Yuiitsu no Ketten); 880. "Brothers in Arms" (戦友, Sen'yū); 881. "The Gaku Ka's Flag" (楽華の旗, Rakuka no Hata); 882. "A Peerless General" (稀代の将軍, Kidai no Shōgun); 883. "Choose To Live" (生の選択, Sei no Sentaku); 884. "Remaining Manpower" (残存戦力, Zanson Senryoku); 885. "Everyone's Roles" (それぞれの役割, Sorezore no Yakuwari); 886. "The Decoy Soldiers" (囮の軍勢, Otori no Gunzei); 887. "The Flying Column, Annihilated" (壊滅の別働隊, Kaimetsu no Betsudōtai); 888. "War" (戦争, Sensō); 889. "A Forsaken Land" (見捨てられた地, Misuterareta Chi)

=== Chapters not yet published in volume format ===
These chapters have yet to be published in a tankōbon volume. They were originally serialized in Japanese in issues of Weekly Young Jump from October 2026.

890. "Disgrace" (辱め, Hazukashime)
891. "What Still Needs Protecting" (守られるべきもの, Mamorareru Beki Mono)
892. "A Mysterious Connection" (不思議な縁, Fushigi na En)
893. "The Final Aid" (最後の助け, Saigo no Tasuke)
