= Rikudō =

Japanese manga series

- First tankōbon volume cover

リクドウ
- Genre: Drama; Sports
- Manga
- Written by: Toshimitsu Matsubara
- Published by: Shueisha
- Imprint: Young Jump Comics
- Magazine: Weekly Young Jump
- Original run: April 17, 2014 – May 23, 2019
- Volumes: 23
- icon

Rikudō (リクドウ) is a Japanese manga series written and illustrated by Toshimitsu Matsubara. It was serialized in Shueisha's seinen manga magazine Weekly Young Jump from April 2014 to May 2019, with its chapters collected in 23 tankōbon volumes.

== Publication ==
Written and illustrated by Toshimitsu Matsubara, Rikudō was serialized in Shueisha's seinen manga magazine Weekly Young Jump from April 17, 2014, to May 23, 2019. Shueisha collected its chapters in 23 tankōbon volumes, released from September 19, 2014, to July 19, 2019.

The manga has been licensed in France by Kazé.

=== Volumes ===
No.	Release date	ISBN
1	September 19, 2014	978-4-08-879883-7
2	December 19, 2014	978-4-08-890038-4
3	March 19, 2015	978-4-08-890127-5
4	June 19, 2015	978-4-08-890205-0
5	September 18, 2015	978-4-08-890256-2
6	December 18, 2015	978-4-08-890340-8
7	March 18, 2016	978-4-08-890397-2
8	June 17, 2016	978-4-08-890455-9
9	September 16, 2016	978-4-08-890492-4
10	December 19, 2016	978-4-08-890560-0
11	March 17, 2017	978-4-08-890604-1
12	May 19, 2017	978-4-08-890676-8
13	August 18, 2017	978-4-08-890727-7
14	November 17, 2017	978-4-08-890778-9
15	February 19, 2018	978-4-08-890858-8
16	May 18, 2018	978-4-08-891013-0
17	July 19, 2018	978-4-08-891083-3
18	November 19, 2018	978-4-08-891126-7
19	January 18, 2019	978-4-08-891190-8
20	March 19, 2019	978-4-08-891237-0
21	May 17, 2019	978-4-08-891271-4
22	June 19, 2019	978-4-08-891298-1
23	July 19, 2019	978-4-08-891323-0

== See also ==
- Valhallian the Black Iron, another manga series by the same author
