= Valhallian the Black Iron =

Japanese manga series

- Cover of the first volume

黒鉄のヴァルハリアン (Kurogane no Vuaruharian)
- Genre: Action, isekai
- Manga
- Written by: Toshimitsu Matsubara
- Published by: Shueisha
- Magazine: Weekly Young Jump
- Original run: July 1, 2021 – September 28, 2022
- Volumes: 6

Valhallian the Black Iron (Japanese: 黒鉄のヴァルハリアン, Hepburn: Kurogane no Vuaruharian) is a Japanese manga series written and illustrated by Toshimitsu Matsubara. The series was serialized in Shueisha's Weekly Young Jump magazine from July 2021 to September 2022, with its individual chapters being collected into six volumes.

Fatherhood was a theme Matsubara wanted to focus on following his previous work Rikudō, whose protagonist never knew their father. The series has received mixed reviews, with critics praising the artwork and giving mixed opinions on the story.

== Plot ==
In the 13th century, Japan barely fought off the Mongol invasion, thanks in part to samurai Tetsujiro Soma. Once the threat subsided, Soma is sent back to his domain and only his son, the weak Takemaru, brings him happiness and love. One day, while Tetsujiro fasts to offer his meal to the child, he closes his eyes and finds himself alone and helpless in an unknown forest where he is attacked by Roman legionnaires! He is saved by Hrist, a young winged girl who introduces herself as his appointed valkyrie and that she led him to Valhalla. To return to his son, Tetsujiro must help Hrist to revolt against the forces that dominate the land.

== Production ==
Matsubara decided to focus on fatherhood as a main theme since many of his friends who were about his age were becoming fathers and discussing how to be a good example for their children. He also felt it would be a good departure from his previous work Rikudō, whose protagonist never knew his father.

== Publication ==
Written and illustrated by Toshimitsu Matsubara, the series began serialization in Shueisha's Weekly Young Jump magazine on July 1, 2021. The series completed serialization in Weekly Young Jump on September 28, 2022. The series' individual chapters were collected into six tankōbon volumes.

In France, the series has been published by Ki-oon.

=== Volume list ===
No.	Japanese release date	Japanese ISBN
1	October 19, 2021	978-4-08-892109-9
2	January 19, 2022	978-4-08-892190-7
3	April 19, 2022	978-4-08-892277-5
4	July 19, 2022	978-4-08-892373-4
5	October 19, 2022	978-4-08-892461-8
6	January 19, 2023	978-4-08-892569-1

== Reception ==
A columnist for Manga Sanctuary praised the illustrations and action scenes, particularly for their basis in real battles. Two columnists for Manga News praised the artwork, with one stating Matsubara continued their style from their previous work Rikudō. They had mixed feelings on the story, with one columnist praising the action and characters, and the other expressing skepticism due to the series' length. Faustine Lillaz of Planete BD felt the story's humor was often executed poorly and that the use of historical legends did not make up for its other shortcomings. However, Lillaz liked the artwork, ultimately concluding that "it's beautiful but lacks finesse".

== See also ==
- Rikudō, another manga series by the same author
