= Usogui =

Japanese manga series

- First tankōbon volume cover

嘘喰い
- Genre: Action; Gambling; Psychological thriller
- Manga
- Written by: Toshio Sako
- Published by: Shueisha
- English publisher: Shueisha (digital)
- Imprint: Young Jump Comics
- Magazine: Weekly Young Jump
- Original run: May 11, 2006 – December 21, 2017
- Volumes: 49
- Original video animation
- Directed by: Kazuo Tomizawa
- Music by: Nao Tokisawa
- Studio: Shueisha
- Released: October 19, 2012
- Manga

Usogui: Tokubetsu-hen
- Written by: Toshio Sako
- Published by: Shueisha
- Imprint: Young Jump Comics
- Magazine: Weekly Young Jump
- Original run: October 7, 2021 – November 25, 2021
- Volumes: 1
- Live-action film
- Directed by: Hideo Nakata
- Studio: Warner Bros. Japan
- Released: February 11, 2022
- icon

Usogui (嘘喰い; lit. 'The Lie Eater') is a Japanese manga series written and illustrated by Toshio Sako. It was serialized in Shueisha's seinen manga magazine Weekly Young Jump from May 2006 to December 2017, with its chapters collected in 49 tankōbon volumes. An original video animation adaptation was released in October 2012. A live-action film adaptation premiered in February 2022.

== Plot ==
Baku Madarame (斑目 貘, Madarame Baku) (portrayed by Ryusei Yokohama in the live-action film), known as The Lie Eater (Usogui), is a master gambler who thrives on high-stakes games against ruthless and maniacal opponents. Alongside his loyal protege Takaomi Kaji (梶 隆臣, Kaji Takaomi) and his formidable bodyguard Marco (マルコ, Maruko), Baku sets his sights on taking control of Kakerou (賭郎), an underground gambling organization that oversees life-threatening wagers.

Kakerou ensures the integrity of these extreme gambles by acting as a neutral referee, with 48 elite members and 101 referees who supervise the games and enforce their outcomes. These referees are also tasked with collecting debts, even when the stakes involve participants' very lives.

As Baku delves deeper into the shadowy world of Kakerou, he and his crew find themselves entangled in a fierce conflict with a rival criminal organization known as IDEAL. The stakes grow ever higher as Baku faces off against opponents in ingenious and deadly games such as "Escape the Abandoned Building", "Old Maid", and "Hangman".

Through his gambling skills, Baku navigates a dangerous world, risking everything to claim dominance over Kakerou and to survive the deadly games coming his way.

== Media ==
=== Manga ===
Written and illustrated by Toshio Sako, Usogui was serialized in Shueisha's seinen manga magazine Weekly Young Jump from May 11, 2006, to December 21, 2017. Shueisha collected its 539 chapters in 49 tankōbon volumes, released from September 19, 2006, to February 19, 2018. Shueisha began publishing the manga in English on its Manga Million digital platform in 2026.

A spin-off manga, titled Usogui: Rikkainin Yakō Hikoichi (嘘喰い-立会人 夜行妃古壱-), was serialized in Weekly Young Jump from October 7 to November 25, 2021, with its chapters collected in a single tankōbon volume, released on February 2, 2022.

==== Volumes ====
No.	Release date	ISBN
01	September 19, 2006	978-4-08-877146-5
02	December 19, 2006	978-4-08-877186-1
03	March 19, 2007	978-4-08-877229-5
04	June 19, 2007	978-4-08-877280-6
05	September 19, 2007	978-4-08-877320-9
06	December 19, 2007	978-4-08-877362-9
07	March 19, 2008	978-4-08-877410-7
08	June 19, 2008	978-4-08-877463-3
09	September 19, 2008	978-4-08-877505-0
10	December 19, 2008	978-4-08-877570-8
11	March 19, 2009	978-4-08-877616-3
12	June 19, 2009	978-4-08-877667-5
13	September 18, 2009	978-4-08-877717-7
14	December 18, 2009	978-4-08-877776-4
15	December 18, 2009	978-4-08-877801-3
16	March 19, 2010	978-4-08-877827-3
17	June 18, 2010	978-4-08-877876-1
18	September 17, 2010	978-4-08-879027-5
19	December 17, 2010	978-4-08-879079-4
20	March 18, 2011	978-4-08-879115-9
21	June 17, 2011	978-4-08-879158-6
22	September 16, 2011	978-4-08-879202-6
23	December 19, 2011	978-4-08-879241-5
24	March 19, 2012	978-4-08-879290-3
25	June 19, 2012	978-4-08-879351-1
26	October 19, 2012	978-4-08-879441-9
27	November 19, 2012	978-4-08-879462-4
28	February 19, 2013	978-4-08-879520-1
29	May 17, 2013	978-4-08-879559-1
30	August 19, 2013	978-4-08-879628-4
31	November 19, 2013	978-4-08-879682-6
32	February 19, 2014	978-4-08-879750-2
33	May 19, 2014	978-4-08-879846-2
34	August 20, 2014	978-4-08-879886-8
35	November 19, 2014	978-4-08-890074-2
36	February 19, 2015	978-4-08-890115-2
37	May 19, 2015	978-4-08-890152-7
38	May 19, 2015	978-4-08-890194-7
39	September 18, 2015	978-4-08-890252-4
40	December 18, 2015	978-4-08-890320-0
41	April 19, 2016	978-4-08-890373-6
42	June 17, 2016	978-4-08-890430-6
43	September 16, 2016	978-4-08-890481-8
44	December 19, 2016	978-4-08-890520-4
45	March 17, 2017	978-4-08-890592-1
46	June 19, 2017	978-4-08-890645-4
47	August 18, 2017	978-4-08-890728-4
48	November 17, 2017	978-4-08-890788-8
49	February 19, 2018	978-4-08-890856-4

=== Original video animation ===
An original video animation (OVA) adaptation, directed by Kazuo Tomizawa, was bundled with the limited edition of the 26th manga volume, released on October 19, 2012.

=== Live-action film ===
A live-action film adaptation was announced in the 24th issue of Shueisha's Weekly Young Jump magazine in 2016. The film is produced by Warner Bros. Japan and directed by Hideo Nakata. The film was released in Japan on February 11, 2022.

== Reception ==
The manga's compiled book volumes have frequently ranked on Oricon's weekly top 50 comic charts. Volume 10 reached number 28, Volume 11 reached number 16, Volume 12 reached number 19, Volume 13 reached number 29, Volume 14 reached number 20, Volume 16 reached number 19, Volume 17 reached number 21, Volume 18 reached number 18, Volume 19 reached number 27, Volume 20 reached number 25.

== See also ==
- Gambling in Japan
- Batuque, another manga series written by Toshio Sako
- Genikasuri, another manga series written by Toshio Sako
