= Girl Friend (manga) =

Japanese manga series

- Manga volume 1 cover

ガールフレンド (Gaarufurendo)
- Genre: Romance
- Manga
- Written by: Masaya Hokazono
- Illustrated by: Betten Court
- Published by: Shueisha
- Magazine: Young Jump Zōkan Mankaku (2003, 2004); Weekly Young Jump (2003–2007)
- Original run: May 1, 2003 – March 29, 2007
- Volumes: 5

Girl Friend (Japanese: ガールフレンド, Hepburn: Gaarufurendo) is a Japanese manga written by Masaya Hokazono and illustrated by Betten Court. It was published in Shueisha's seinen manga magazine Young Jump Zōkan Mankaku and Weekly Young Jump from 2003 to 2007, with its chapters collected in five tankōbon volumes. The series contains a collection of short stories about romantic relationships of high school girls.

== Publication ==
Written by Masaya Hokazono and illustrated by Betten Court, Girl Friend started with a series of one-shot chapters published in Young Jump Zōkan Mankaku and Weekly Young Jump from May 1 to November 27, 2003. The series started an irregular serialization in the latter on February 12, 2004; another chapter was published in Young Jump Zōkan Mankaku on March 16 of that same year. The series finished on March 29, 2007. Shueisha collected its chapters in five tankōbon volumes, released from June 18, 2004, and June 19, 2007.

The manga was licensed in France by Delcourt.

=== Volumes ===
No.	Japanese release date	Japanese ISBN
1	June 18, 2004	978-4-08-876623-2
2	March 13, 2005	978-4-08-876765-9
3	December 19, 2005	978-4-08-876894-6
4	September 19, 2006	978-4-08-877145-8
5	June 19, 2007	978-4-08-877263-9

== Reception ==
BD Gest' claimed that the series can be summarized in three words: "School, sex, and socks". They commented that the relationships portrayed are flawed relationships because of their adolescent bases and their alternations between fantasy and reality, as well as an excessive focus on having love based purely on sex. They also felt that the series has potential, but also has great room for disappointment. Manga News commended Betten, saying that his work is "indeed sumptuous". The review also commended Hokazono's ability "to tell in a few pages, the randomness/hazard of the first love relationships". Animeland commended the manga for "every possible relationship combinations between young adults" without pudeur. Later reviews from Manga News criticized the stories as clichéd, but commended the stories for "keep their funny side without overdoing it".
