= Libidors =

Japanese manga series

- First tankōbon volume cover

リビドーズ (Ribidōzu)
- Manga
- Written by: Masaki Kasahara
- Published by: Shueisha
- Imprint: Young Jump Comics
- Magazine: Weekly Young Jump
- Original run: November 1, 2018 – July 16, 2020
- Volumes: 7
- icon

Libidors (Japanese: リビドーズ, Hepburn: Ribidōzu) is a Japanese manga series written and illustrated by Masaki Kasahara. It was serialized in Shueisha's seinen manga magazine Weekly Young Jump from November 2018 to July 2020, with its chapters collected in seven tankōbon volumes.

== Publication ==
Written and illustrated by Masaki Kasahara, Libidors was serialized in Shueisha's seinen manga magazine Weekly Young Jump from November 1, 2018, to July 16, 2020. Shueisha collected its chapters in seven tankōbon volumes, released from February 19, 2019, to August 19, 2020.

=== Volumes ===
No.	Release date	ISBN
1	February 19, 2019	978-4-08-891234-9
2	May 17, 2019	978-4-08-891256-1
3	August 19, 2019	978-4-08-891343-8
4	November 19, 2019	978-4-08-891428-2
5	February 19, 2020	978-4-08-891543-2
6	May 19, 2020	978-4-08-891594-4
7	August 19, 2020	978-4-08-891651-4
