= Genikasuri =

Japanese manga series

- First tankōbon volume cover

げにかすり
- Genre: Action; Sports
- Manga
- Written by: Toshio Sako
- Published by: Shueisha
- Imprint: Young Jump Comics
- Magazine: Weekly Young Jump
- Original run: February 6, 2025 – present
- Volumes: 4

Genikasuri (Japanese: げにかすり) is a Japanese manga series written and illustrated by Toshio Sako. It has been serialized in Shueisha's seinen manga magazine Weekly Young Jump since February 2025, with its chapters collected in three tankōbon volumes.

== Plot ==
Up-and-coming professional boxer Ryo Harima falls into a two-year vegetative state after sustaining an injury in a match. He eventually wakes up, only to be hit with a series of misfortunes, including a retirement notice and the death of his father. A certain event then leads him to decide to support boxing from the shadows as a promoter.

== Characters ==
Ryo Harima (はりまりょう)
A boxing promoter with short, brown hair. He started boxing at his father's suggestion and was a professional boxer. His record was 10 wins and 1 loss (7 KOs), and he was ranked in both the Japan and OPBF bantamweight class. The gym's president calls him "Harry." He faced a title match for his father but suffered a TKO loss due to damage from his opponent's punch. After head surgery, he was in a vegetative state for two years. Upon awakening, he learns about his father's death and the state of the gym, leading to despair. However, he decides to become a promoter and help support boxing behind the scenes after learning about Hanabi.
Tokisada Hanabi (はなび ときさだ)
A professional boxer. During his amateur career, he won a silver medal in the Olympic Featherweight category but was dissatisfied with the result and garnered hate from the public for burning the Japanese flag during the awards ceremony. He has short, black hair, but suffered a burn on the right side of his head when he burned the flag. He is known for his aggressive fighting style.

== Publication ==
Written and illustrated by Toshio Sako, Genikasuri has been serialized in Shueisha's seinen manga magazine Weekly Young Jump since February 6, 2025. It was announced in Weekly Young Jump issue 9, which was released on January 30, 2025, that the series would start in the next issue. Initially, it was a weekly serialization, but starting from May 29, 2025, it switched to a bi-weekly schedule.

The series is simultaneously published in English on Shueisha's Manga Plus platform.

=== Volumes ===
No.	Japanese release date	Japanese ISBN
1	June 18, 2025	978-4-08-893697-0
2	September 19, 2025	978-4-08-893869-1
3	December 19, 2025	978-4-08-894054-0
4	May 19, 2026	978-4-08-894231-5
5	November 18, 2026	978-4-08-894312-1

== See also ==
- Batuque, another manga series written by Toshio Sako
- Usogui, another manga series written by Toshio Sako
