= Gravuretry =

Japanese manga series

- First tankōbon volume cover

グラビアトリ (Gurabiatori)
- Manga
- Written by: Kakeru Sato
- Published by: Shueisha
- Imprint: Young Jump Comics
- Magazine: Weekly Young Jump
- Original run: September 10, 2015 – June 30, 2016
- Volumes: 4
- icon

Gravuretry (Japanese: グラビアトリ, Hepburn: Gurabiatori) is a Japanese manga series written and illustrated by Kakeru Sato. It was serialized in Shueisha's seinen manga magazine Weekly Young Jump from September 2015 to June 2016.

== Publication ==
Written and illustrated by Kakeru Sato, Gravuretry was serialized in Shueisha's seinen manga magazine Weekly Young Jump from September 10, 2015, to June 30, 2016. Shueisha collected its chapters in four tankōbon volumes, released from February 19 to July 19, 2016.

=== Volumes ===
No.	Japanese release date	Japanese ISBN
1	February 19, 2016	978-4-08-890426-9
2	March 18, 2016	978-4-08-890427-6
3	May 19, 2016	978-4-08-890446-7
4	July 19, 2016	978-4-08-890469-6
