= Soon, You'll Paint Your Heart Out =

Japanese manga series

- First tankōbon volume cover

やがて絵筆を映ろし君は (Yagate Efude o Utsuroshi Kimi wa)
- Genre: Comedy
- Manga
- Written by: Neguse Okita
- Published by: Shueisha
- Imprint: Young Jump Comics
- Magazine: Weekly Young Jump
- Original run: December 4, 2025 – present
- Volumes: 3

Soon, You'll Paint Your Heart Out (Japanese: やがて絵筆を映ろし君は, Hepburn: Yagate Efude o Utsuroshi Kimi wa) is a Japanese manga series written and illustrated by Neguse Okita. It began serialization in Shueisha's seinen manga magazine Weekly Young Jump in December 2025.

== Synopsis ==
Airi Aikawa is a struggling manga artist. When she visits the home of her former art mentor, she discovers that her mentor's grandson and her childhood friend and ex-student Hinaki is dealing with financial issues regarding art school. She proposes that Hinaki live with her to help his financial situation. However, Airi is trying to keep her career as adult manga artist Mikosuri Hayakawa a secret from Hinaki.

== Characters ==
Airi Aikawa (藍川あいり, Aikawa Airi)
Voiced by: Mariya Ise (voice comic)
Hinaki Osato (大里日菜樹, Ōsato Hinaki)
Voiced by: Gen Satō (voice comic)

== Media ==
=== Manga ===
Written and illustrated by Neguse Okita, Soon, You'll Paint Your Heart Out began serialization in Shueisha's seinen manga magazine Weekly Young Jump on December 4, 2025. Its chapters have been compiled into three tankōbon volumes as of October 2026.

The series' chapters are published in English on Shueisha's Manga Plus app.

No.	Release date	ISBN
1	April 17, 2026	978-4-08-894243-8
2	July 17, 2026	978-4-08-894332-9
3	October 19, 2026	978-4-08-894452-4

=== Other ===
In commemoration of the release of the first volume, a voice comic adaptation was uploaded to the Young Jump Manga TV YouTube channel on April 17, 2026. The voice comic featured performances from Mariya Ise and Gen Satō.

== Reception ==
The series has been recommended by manga artist Enma Akiyama.

The series was nominated for the twelfth Next Manga Award in 2026 in the print category.
