= Yuizaki-san wa Nageru! =

Japanese manga series

- First tankōbon volume cover

結崎さんはなげる!
- Genre: Comedy; Slice of life
- Manga
- Written by: Yūma Kagami
- Published by: Shueisha
- Magazine: Weekly Young Jump
- Original run: July 7, 2016 – November 22, 2017
- Volumes: 5
- icon

Yuizaki-san wa Nageru! (結崎さんはなげる!; "Yuizaki Throws!") is a Japanese manga series written and illustrated by Yūma Kagami. It was serialized in Shueisha's seinen manga magazine Weekly Young Jump from July 2016 to December 2017, with its chapters collected in five tankōbon volumes.

== Plot ==
First-year student Oomiya Wataru joins Mitsuku High's struggling track team as punishment for tardiness. Initially uninterested, he is inspired after witnessing classmate Yuzuki Nazuna's dedication to shot put. Under captain Futami Nishiki's guidance, Wataru trains with friend Kashima Keitaro and chooses shot put for his first competition, only to learn participation is optional for first-years. Though he performs poorly at the record meet due to inexperience, Nazuna's encouragement motivates him to continue training, strengthening their bond and his relationships with seniors Todou Kaede and Akizuki Koharu.

During summer training camp, Wataru misunderstands Nazuna's romantic interests but later learns she is solely focused on athletics. As autumn qualifiers approach, he adopts the difficult rotational throw technique to improve, while the female recruits swimmer Ouji Misa after Nazuna loses a challenge but wins her respect. At the qualifiers, Wataru succeeds despite rival Yaotome High's interference, particularly against Nishiki by athlete Kobayakawa. After Todou Kaede is sabotaged in the 100-meter dash, Nazuna leads the team to relay victory, exposing Yaotome's misconduct.

For the finals, Nazuna masters the step-back throw after being inspired by Wataru's determination. The tournament sees Nishiki defeat Kobayakawa, mending their rivalry, while Nazuna breaks records against Shojya Yaeko in shot put. When Wataru competes, his worry about Nazuna being scouted by elite Ichikawa High proves correct. Though initially distracted and behind opponent Yoshino Alexander, his refusal to quit inspires others, culminating in strong overall results and his eighth-place finish.

== Publication ==
Written and illustrated by Yūma Kagami, Yuizaki-san wa Nageru! was serialized in Shueisha's seinen manga magazine Weekly Young Jump from July 7, 2016, to November 22, 2017. Shueisha collected is chapters in five tankōbon volumes, released from January 19, 2017, to January 19, 2018.

=== Volumes ===
No.	Release date	ISBN
1	January 19, 2017	978-4-08-890576-1
2	February 17, 2017	978-4-08-890595-2
3	June 19, 2017	978-4-08-890646-1
4	October 19, 2017	978-4-08-890763-5
5	January 19, 2018	978-4-08-890843-4
