= Cyclops Shōjo Saipu =

Japanese manga series

- Cover of the first volume of Cyclops Shōjo Saipu manga featuring Fuuka Saitou

サイクロプス少女さいぷ～ (Saikuropusu Shōjo Saipū)
- Genre: Comedy
- Manga
- Written by: Yasu Tora
- Published by: Shueisha
- Magazine: Weekly Young Jump
- Original run: July 7, 2011 – September 25, 2014
- Volumes: 4
- Original net animation
- Released: March 12, 2013 – May 30, 2013
- Runtime: 2–3 minutes
- Episodes: 12

Cyclops Shōjo Saipu (Japanese: サイクロプス少女さいぷ～, Hepburn: Saikuropusu Shōjo Saipū; "Cyclops Girl Saipu" or "Cyclops Girl Cypu") is a Japanese yonkoma manga series written and illustrated by Yasu Tora. It first appeared in Shueisha's Weekly Young Jump as various one-shot chapters from November 2010 to March 2011 and was then regularly serialized in the magazine from July 2011 to September 2014. Shueisha compiles them into four tankōbon volumes. It was adapted into an original net animation (ONA) in 2013. The manga focuses on the adventures of a middle school girl named Fuuka Saitou known for her height and hair that covered her left eye, earning her the nickname "Saipu" (based on cyclopes).

== Plot ==
Fuuka Saitou, a middle school student known for her nickname "Saipu", has a brother complex towards her brother Hikaru. The story follows their daily lives as she tries to gain his affection through perverted ways.

== Characters ==
Fuuka Saitou (斎藤 楓香, Saitō Fūka)
Voiced by: Mai Nakahara
Fuuka Saitou is a 14-year-old girl in her second year of junior high (8th grade). Because of her 180 cm (5 ft 11 in) stature and peekaboo bangs hairstyle, she is nicknamed "Saipu" (さいぷ), shorten for cyclops (サイクロプス, saikuropusu) from Greek and Roman mythology. Two years before the start of the series, when she was shorter than her brother Hikaru, Fuuka makes a promise that she would grow up and marry him.^{Ch. 1} She has a strong brother complex and is extremely sensitive and jealous of any female affections directed towards him. Fuuka often cosplays as girls that Hikaru liked^{Ch. 11, 22, 35} and teases him with perverted innuendos, although some situations turn out to be innocent wordplay.^{Ch. 1, 2} She is admired by everyone for her model-like figure; she also is a resourceful cook and has excellent grades. When asked the reason for hiding her left eye, Fuuka replies that it hid a dark power.^{Ch. 35}
Hikaru Saitou (斎藤 光, Saitō Hikaru)
Voiced by: Kengo Takanashi
Hikaru Saitou is Fuuka's older brother and the object of her affection; he is a first-year university student currently living at home with his younger sister. He is the shortest at 165 cm (5 ft 5 in) in his family and has to regularly fend off her teases and advances,^{Ch. 1} as well as others in the series. When Fuuka acted cold on him the other day, Hikaru becomes flustered.^{Ch. 41, 42}

Fuuka has several female classmates that she regularly hangs out with: Rin (りん) (voiced by Saki Fujita), who wears pigtails, is strongly perverted that her other classmates often ignore her comments;^{Ch. 5, 7, 16} Nacchan (なつ, Natsu) (voiced by Kahoru Sasajima), acts as the straight-man as she retorts Rin's perverted comments;^{Ch. 2, 39} Class Representative, who wears glasses and braids and secretly crushes on Fuuka;^{Ch. 2} and Kamiji, a tall girl with short hair who gives off a cool attitude like a delinquent, but is actually soft-spoken and rather self-conscious.^{Ch. 3}

Other recurring characters include: the Saitou parents, who approve of Fuuka's brother complex; Hikaru's college radio club friends Sato and Suzuki,^{Ch. 6, 9} and their flirtatious president Eri, the last of whom causes Fuuka to be extremely jealous;^{Ch. 29} their cousins Akari and Souta Haruno, who conspire to split them apart;^{Ch. 12} and their neighbors the Yamakuras.^{Ch. 24}

== Media ==
=== Manga ===
Cyclops Shōjo Saipu, written and illustrated by Yasu Tora, debuted as a series of one-shots in Shueisha's Weekly Young Jump from November 18, 2010, to March 24, 2011. It was then regularly serialized in the magazine from July 7, 2011, to September 25, 2014. Shueisha has compiled its chapters into four tankōbon volumes, released from May 18, 2012, to November 19, 2014.

==== Volume list ====
No.	Release date	ISBN
1	May 18, 2012	978-4-08-879331-3
Chapter 1: Big; Chapter 2: I Understand!; Chapter 3: Drowning; Chapter 4: Right On; Chapter 5: Tent; Chapter 6: Onii-sama; Chapter 7: Male's Point of View; Chapter 8: Lemme See!; Chapter 9: Launch Up!; Chapter 10: Album; Chapter 11: If It Worries Me; Chapter 12: Boob Alien; Chapter 13: What the Hell!?; Chapter 14: Nickname; Chapter 15: If It Was Big; Chapter 16: Aren't You an Adult~; Chapter 17: Kamiji-san Notices; Chapter 18: Why Are You Here?; Chapter 19: Youthful Middle Schooler; Chapter 20: Don't Open It!; Chapter 21: A Different Morning; Chapter 22: Magazine; Chapter 23: Ponytail; Chapter 24: Young Man; Chapter 25: Tetsu-nee; Chapter 26: Imouto-flavored; Chapter 27: Male Clothing; Chapter 28: Being Chased; Chapter 29: Imouto's Intuition; Chapter 30: Seasonal Uniform Change; Chapter 31: In the Clubroom; Chapter 32: It's Totally Up!; Chapter 33: Mic; Chapter 34: Live High School Girls; Chapter 35: Live Confession; Chapter 36: Mystery of the Left Eye; Chapter 37: Closing Party
2	March 19, 2013	978-4-08-879538-6
Chapter 38: Shackled; Chapter 39: A Retort; Chapter 40: Miracle; Chapter 41: A Cool Saipu; Chapter 42: Brother's Feelings; Chapter 43: Assault of the Cousins; Chapter 44: Angel vs. Devil; Chapter 45: It's Here!; Chapter 46: My Way.; Chapter 47: Saipu-sensei; Chapter 48: A Simpleton; Chapter 49: Technician; Chapter 50: Family Meeting; Chapter 51: The Chairman's Confession; Chapter 52: Ah; Chapter 53: Only Two People's Secret; Chapter 54: By Appearance; Chapter 55: Big Kid; Chapter 56: *-schooler; Chapter 57: Meduko; Chapter 58: Virgin!?; Chapter 59: First; Chapter 60: Wife♡; Chapter 61: Maiden?; Chapter 62: Important Announcement; Chapter 63: Mother's Lesson; Chapter 64: Like Brother Like Sister; Chapter 65: Congrats; Chapter 66: The Two Experts; Chapter 67: During 25 Years; Chapter 68: Saotome-sensei's Past; Chapter 69: First Dream of the Year; Chapter 70: Why Only Me?; Chapter 71: That Was Rude; Chapter 72: Running Bloomers; Chapter 73: Mixer; Chapter 74: Wholesome; Chapter 75: Itching To Do It
3	January 17, 2014	978-4-08-879737-3
Chapter 76: Saipu Worried; Chapter 77: Hearing; Chapter 78: Staying Away; Chapter 79: You're Lying!?; Chapter 80: Warming Up; Chapter 81: I Am Sorry With That; Chapter 82: If I Can Go Out With Her; Chapter 83: Escort; Chapters 84–85; Chapter 86: Extremely Sorrowful; Chapter 87: Extremely Red; Chapter 88: No Worry; Chapter 89: Black President; Chapter 90: Height Difference; Chapter 91: S Switch; Chapter 92: The Clothes; Chapter 93: Friends!!; Chapter 94: Response To Confession; Chapter 95: Such a Face; Chapter 96: Modelling; Chapter 97: Two Worlds; Chapter 98: Good Grief, Hikaru; Chapter 99: The Cuteness of Height; Chapter 100: How They Met; Chapter 101: More Than Just The Ball; Chapter 102: The Cousins Transfer; Chapter 103: Thank You, Hikaru; Chapter 104: Terrifying; Chapter 105: I Can't Use This; Chapter 106: Meduko's Feelings; Chapter 107: Deadbeat; Chapter 108: From India; Chapter 109: Body Measurements; Chapter 110: Idiocy; Chapter 111: Saipu, Kamiji; Chapter 112: Getting Kissed; Chapter 113: India
4	November 19, 2014	978-4-08-890029-2
Chapter 114: No Escape Route; Chapter 115: Changing Hikaru's Mind; Chapter 116: If They Matched; Chapter 117: Feelings; Chapter 118: I Already Knew About It; Chapter 119: Common Knowledge; Chapter 120: Outnumbered; Chapter 121: In The Clubroom; Chapter 122: Stealing Him Away; Chapter 123: Hikaru's Past; Chapter 124: I'll Kiss You♡; Chapter 125: Rin and Souta; Chapter 126: Younger Sister's Whales; Chapter 127: Meeting Meduko; Chapter 128: Detonation Switch; Chapter 129: Heart Pains; Chapter 130: Beneath the Bridge; Chapter 131: Mysterious Blonde Man; Chapter 132: Aiming For My Sister...?; Chapter 133: Tiny Fuuka?; Chapter 134: A Day of Encounters; Chapter 135: Airport Film Shoot; Chapter 136: Everybody's Reaction; Chapter 137: The Apollo Siblings; Chapter 138: Promotion; Chapter 139: Idols and Regular People; Chapter 140: Costume Switch; Chapters 141–152; Final Story: 4 Years Later; Special One-shot

=== Original net animation ===
The manga was adapted into an original net animation, which was released from March 12 to May 30, 2013. Each episode is about 2–3 minutes long and consists of short gags from the manga.

==== Episode list ====
No.	Original release date
1	March 12, 2013
Fuuka Saitou makes a promise from two years ago to marry her brother named Hikaru Saitou once she grows up. Fuuka's popularity in school attracts the attention of Natsu but she shockingly learns from Rin Fujisaki about Fuuka's nickname. Fuuka consumes milk and a banana but her actions make Hikaru uncomfortable. Fuuka bakes a cake for the first time for Hikaru.
2	March 19, 2013
Fuuka and Hikaru brush teeth together when he noticed her sister's outfit. Hikaru asks Fuuka to stop hugging him since her breasts hit his head. Fuuka keeps on hugging Hikaru as they meet Natsu and Rin. Fuuka boldly tells her classmate about forgetting to wear a bra.
3	March 21, 2013
Rin makes a sexual innuendo about Fuuka and tent setup during their class' camping trip. Rin later finds a phallic mushroom. Later night, Rin fondles Fuuka's breasts while the latter is sleeping. Fuuka returns home from camping and presents Hikaru the phallic mushroom.
4	March 28, 2013
Fuuka and Hikaru go to a festival with her classmates. Natsu and Rin then scoops goldfishes while Hikaru watches them. They watch fireworks when she asked him to lay on her lap. Hikaru then notices Fuuka's kimono that revealed her cleavage.
5	April 4, 2013
Fuuka persuades Hikaru to eat watermelons together. After they ate, Fuuka's full stomach makes her feel pregnant. While looking at her photo album of when she was little, Hikaru notices Fuuka's growing breasts. He also notices how she got taller than him when she reached middle school.
6	April 11, 2013
During their P.E. class, the boys watch Fuuka in awe with her hair tied in a ponytail. They then imagine the girls in class wearing bloomers. Rin challenges the boys and makes a bet that they could grope Fuuka's breasts if they win. In the end, they lose because they get distracted by Fuuka's breasts during their volleyball match.
7	April 18, 2013
Fuuka hands over a body soap refill to Hikaru while he is taking a bath and offers to scrub his back as an apology. After she washed Hikaru's back, Fuuka offers to wash his front but she gets dismayed when she found him not getting an erection. After she left, Hikaru reveals how he used his thighs to prevent his erection.
8	April 25, 2013
Inside a karaoke box, Natsu is left alone by Rin and begins to compare a microphone to the size of a penis. Rin catches Natsu in the act then she begins to sexually tease her and fondles her breasts until Fuuka drops by their booth.
9	May 9, 2013
Fuuka acts cold towards Hikaru, confusing him. Fuuka drinks milk in front of Hikaru as it drips from her mouth, arousing him. She then calls him a pervert. Fuuka cheerfully greets Hikaru the following morning.
10	May 16, 2013
It is revealed that Fuuka's cold attitude towards Hikaru was part of her plan to make him fall in love with her but it backfires when he started to avoid her. Fuuka then cryingly apologizes to Hikaru. Their mother watches them after her hugging sexually positioned them.
11	May 23, 2013
Rin makes Fuuka wear a teacher outfit and starts to fondle her breasts until Natsu stops her. Rin then invites them to her brother's room, where they found pornographic materials.
12	May 30, 2013
Fuuka becomes depressed when a club president stole Hikaru's first kiss. Rin suggests provoking him to make a move on her instead.

== Works cited ==
- "Ch." is shortened form for chapter and refers to a chapter number of the Cyclops Shōjo Saipu manga
