= Bungo (manga) =

Japanese manga series

- First tankōbon volume cover
- Genre: Sports
- Manga
- Written by: Yūji Ninomiya
- Published by: Shueisha
- Imprint: Young Jump Comics
- Magazine: Weekly Young Jump
- Original run: December 18, 2014 – December 26, 2024
- Volumes: 41
- Manga

Bungo: Unreal
- Written by: Yūji Ninomiya
- Published by: Shueisha
- Imprint: Young Jump Comics
- Magazine: Weekly Young Jump
- Original run: October 9, 2025 – present
- Volumes: 3
- icon

Bungo (stylized in all caps) is a Japanese baseball-themed manga series written and illustrated by Yūji Ninomiya. It was serialized in Shueisha's seinen manga magazine Weekly Young Jump from December 2014 to December 2024, with its chapters collected in 41 tankōbon volumes. A second series, Bungo: Unreal, started in October 2025.

== Synopsis ==
In a remote town in Shizuoka Prefecture, where soccer is the ingrained popular sport, the young boy Bungo Ishihama discovers the joy of baseball after playing catch with his father. However, because there is no Little League in his area, he is forced to practice by throwing against a wall at home.

Three years after he began wall practice, as he was about to enter middle school, he was pitching at a local baseball field when he was challenged by Yukio Noda, a prodigy hitter the same age as him, and a member of Japan's national youth baseball team. Though Bungo threw a fastball that was unbelievable for an elementary school student, Yukio easily hit a home run on the third pitch.

Approximately two weeks later, Bungo reunites with Yukio at the same middle school and joins the baseball team, to which Yukio belongs, for the sake of challenging him again. Aiming for the top of middle school baseball, they engage in fierce battles. He is soon noticed by Hiroto Mizushima, a third-year student who is just recovering from an injury, and Bungo is now challenged to a match against him. However, midway through the match, Bungo's older sister, Kaori Ishihama, appears and reveals that Bungo, who has always thrown right-handed, is actually left-handed. Despite his poor pitching form, his very first left-handed pitch displays a velocity that cannot be compared to his right-handed throw.

As time passes, Bungo and Yukio move on to high school, setting their sights on achieving "five consecutive Koshien championships", once again striving for the top.

== Publication ==
Written and illustrated by Yūji Ninomiya, Bungo was serialized in Shueisha's seinen manga magazine Weekly Young Jump from December 18, 2014, to December 26, 2024. Shueisha collected its chapters in 41 tankōbon volumes, released from July 17, 2015, to April 17, 2025.

A sequel, Bungo: Unreal, started in Weekly Young Jump on October 9, 2025. Shueisha is simultaneously publishing the manga digitally on its Manga Plus platform. Shueisha released its first volume on March 18, 2026. Three volumes have been released as of September 17, 2026.

=== Volumes ===
==== Bungo ====
No.	Release date	ISBN
1	July 17, 2015	978-4-08-890189-3
2	August 19, 2015	978-4-08-890190-9
3	October 19, 2015	978-4-08-890306-4
4	February 19, 2016	978-4-08-890359-0
5	May 19, 2016	978-4-08-890412-2
6	August 19, 2016	978-4-08-890541-9
7	December 19, 2016	978-4-08-890542-6
8	December 19, 2016	978-4-08-890585-3
9	March 17, 2017	978-4-08-890642-3
10	June 19, 2017	978-4-08-890684-3
11	September 19, 2017	978-4-08-890741-3
12	December 19, 2017	978-4-08-890822-9
13	March 19, 2018	978-4-08-890878-6
14	June 19, 2018	978-4-08-891047-5
15	September 19, 2018	978-4-08-891097-0
16	December 19, 2018	978-4-08-891097-0
17	March 19, 2019	978-4-08-891227-1
18	June 19, 2019	978-4-08-891316-2
19	August 19, 2019	978-4-08-891345-2
20	November 19, 2019	978-4-08-891432-9
21	February 19, 2020	978-4-08-891478-7
22	March 19, 2020	978-4-08-891541-8
23	June 19, 2020	978-4-08-891583-8
24	September 18, 2020	978-4-08-891644-6
25	December 18, 2020	978-4-08-891734-4
26	March 18, 2021	978-4-08-891815-0
27	June 18, 2021	978-4-08-892026-9
28	August 18, 2021	978-4-08-892049-8
29	November 19, 2021	978-4-08-892134-1
30	March 18, 2022	978-4-08-892212-6
31	June 17, 2022	978-4-08-892295-9
32	August 19, 2022	978-4-08-892457-1
33	November 17, 2022	978-4-08-892492-2
34	March 17, 2023	978-4-08-892626-1
35	June 19, 2023	978-4-08-892687-2
36	August 18, 2023	978-4-08-892788-6
37	December 19, 2023	978-4-08-893042-8
38	March 18, 2024	978-4-08-893167-8
39	August 19, 2024	978-4-08-893354-2
40	December 18, 2024	978-4-08-893475-4
41	April 17, 2025	978-4-08-893615-4

==== Bungo: Unreal ====
No.	Release date	ISBN
1	March 18, 2026	978-4-08-894088-5
2	July 17, 2026	978-4-08-894333-6
3	September 17, 2026	978-4-08-894404-3

== Reception ==
By June 2021, the manga had over 3.5 million copies in circulation. By December 2024, it had over 7 million copies in circulation.
