= Catenaccio (manga) =

Japanese manga series

- First tankōbon volume cover

カテナチオ (Katenachio)
- Genre: Sports
- Manga
- Written by: Daisuke Morimoto
- Published by: Shueisha
- Imprint: Young Jump Comics
- Magazine: Weekly Young Jump
- Original run: October 27, 2022 – present
- Volumes: 9

Catenaccio (カテナチオ, Katenachio) is a Japanese manga series written and illustrated by Daisuke Morimoto. It was initially published as a one-shot published on Shueisha's Tonari no Young Jump website in January 2022. It later began serialization in Shueisha's seinen manga magazine Weekly Young Jump in October of the same year.

The title refers to the ultra-defensive tactical system in soccer called catenaccio.

== Plot ==
Yatarō Araki, who plays as centre-back in Tojo High School soccer club, dreams of becoming a professional player in Europe—a dream he is utterly obsessed with, dedicating everything he has to it. Despite his all-consuming passion, Araki suffers a crushing defeat in his final middle-school match against a prodigy, Asahi Sakakibara, which forces him to confront his own lack of natural talent.

Now, in the final match of his third and final year of high school, and having failed so far to attract the attention of scouts despite his dedication and game intelligence, Araki decides to do whatever it takes to get noticed—even if it means playing dirty and bending the rules.

== Characters ==
Yatarō Araki (嵐木 八咫郎, Araki Yatarō)
Voiced by: Shinichiro Kamio (PV)
Silvio Testa (シルヴィオ・テスタ, Shiruvuio Tesuta)
Voiced by: Kazuhiko Inoue (PV)

== Media ==
=== Manga ===
Written and illustrated by Daisuke Morimoto, Catenaccio was initially published as a one-shot on Shueisha's Tonari no Young Jump website on January 21, 2022. It later began serialization in Shueisha's seinen manga magazine Weekly Young Jump on October 27 of the same year. Its chapters have been compiled into nine tankōbon volumes as of June 2026.

The series is published in English on Shueisha's Manga Plus platform.

No.	Release date	ISBN
1	March 17, 2023	978-4-08-892596-7
2	June 19, 2023	978-4-08-892660-5
3	September 19, 2023	978-4-08-892822-7
4	December 19, 2023	978-4-08-893050-3
5	April 18, 2024	978-4-08-893162-3
6	July 18, 2024	978-4-08-893304-7
7	April 17, 2025	978-4-08-893440-2
8	November 17, 2025	978-4-08-893799-1
9	June 18, 2026	978-4-08-894254-4

=== Other ===
A promotional video commemorating the release of the series' first volume was released on the Weekly Young Jump YouTube channel on March 17, 2023. It featured the voices of Shinichiro Kamio and Kazuhiko Inoue.

== Reception ==
By December 2024, the series had over 200,000 copies in circulation.
