= Gunjō Senki =

Japanese manga series

- First tankōbon volume cover

群青戦記
- Genre: Action; Historical
- Manga
- Written by: Masaki Kasahara
- Published by: Shueisha
- Imprint: Young Jump Comics
- Magazine: Weekly Young Jump
- Original run: August 29, 2013 – June 15, 2017
- Volumes: 17
- Manga

Shin Gunjō Senki
- Written by: Masaki Kasahara
- Illustrated by: Azychika
- Published by: Shueisha
- Magazine: Weekly Young Jump
- Original run: January 7, 2021 – March 17, 2022
- Volumes: 5
- Live-action film

Brave: Gunjō Senki
- Directed by: Katsuyuki Motohiro
- Written by: Masahiro Yamaura; Toru Yamamoto
- Music by: Yugo Kanno
- Studio: Toho Studios
- Released: March 21, 2021

Gunjō Senki (群青戦記; "Record of Ultramarine") is a Japanese manga series written and illustrated by Masaki Kasahara. It was serialized in Shueisha's seinen manga magazine Weekly Young Jump from August 2013 to June 2017. A sequel, titled Shin Gunjō Senki, written by Kasahara and illustrated by Azychika, was serialized in the same magazine from January 2021 to March 2022. A live-action film adaptation, titled Brave: Gunjō Senki, premiered in March 2021.

== Media ==
=== Manga ===
Written and illustrated by Masaki Kasahara, Gunjō Senki was serialized in Shueisha's seinen manga magazine Weekly Young Jump from August 29, 2013, to June 15, 2017. Shueisha collected its chapters in 17 tankōbon volumes, released from January 17, 2014, to August 18, 2017.

A sequel, titled Shin Gunjō Senki (真・群青戦記), written by Masaki Kasahara and illustrated by Azychika, was serialized in Weekly Young Jump from January 7, 2021. to March 17, 2022. Shueisha collected its chapters in five volumes, released from March 4, 2021, to April 19, 2022.

==== Gunjō Senki ====
No.	Japanese release date	Japanese ISBN
1	January 17, 2014	978-4-08-879739-7
2	February 19, 2014	978-4-08-879824-0
3	May 19, 2014	978-4-08-879844-8
4	August 20, 2014	978-4-08-879885-1
5	November 19, 2014	978-4-08-890039-1
6	February 19, 2015	978-4-08-890120-6
7	May 19, 2015	978-4-08-890155-8
8	August 19, 2015	978-4-08-890241-8
9	November 19, 2015	978-4-08-890284-5
10	February 19, 2016	978-4-08-890358-3
11	May 19, 2016	978-4-08-890410-8
12	August 19, 2016	978-4-08-890480-1
13	November 18, 2016	978-4-08-890517-4
14	February 17, 2017	978-4-08-890590-7
15	May 19, 2017	978-4-08-890641-6
16	August 18, 2017	978-4-08-890724-6
17	August 18, 2017	978-4-08-890725-3

==== Shin Gunjō Senki ====
No.	Japanese release date	Japanese ISBN
1	March 4, 2021	978-4-08-891859-4
2	June 18, 2021	978-4-08-892005-4
3	September 17, 2021	978-4-08-892076-4
4	December 17, 2021	978-4-08-892169-3
5	April 19, 2022	978-4-08-892249-2

=== Live-action film ===
A live-action film adaptation, titled Brave: Gunjō Senki (ブレイブ ‐群青戦記‐, Bureibu Gunjō Senki) premiered in Japan on March 21, 2021. The film stars Mackenyu as Aoi Nishino, Haruma Miura as Ieyasu Tokugawa, Kenichi Matsuyama as Oda Nobunaga and Hirona Yamazaki as Haruka Seno. It was directed by Katsuyuki Motohiro, with scripts by Masahiro Yamaura and Toru Yamamoto, and music composed by Yugo Kanno. Uverworld performed the film's song theme "Hourglass".

== Reception ==
By November 2019, the Gunjō Senki manga had over 1 million copies in circulation.
