= Stop! I'm Falling for You =

Japanese manga series

- First tankōbon volume cover

やめろ好きになってしまう (Yamero Suki ni Natte Shimau)
- Genre: Romantic comedy
- Manga
- Written by: Akira Moriguchi
- Published by: Shueisha
- Imprint: Young Jump Comics
- Magazine: Tonari no Young Jump; Weekly Young Jump; (February 5, 2026 – present)
- Original run: March 14, 2025 – present
- Volumes: 4

Stop! I'm Falling for You (Japanese: やめろ好きになってしまう, Hepburn: Yamero Suki ni Natte Shimau) is a Japanese manga series written and illustrated by Akira Moriguchi. It was originally published as a one-shot on Shueisha's Tonari no Young Jump manga website in September 2023. It later began serialization on the website in March 2025 and in Weekly Young Jump in February 2026.

== Synopsis ==
Azuma Matsuura has always lived his life putting on a façade, so much so that he is able to detect people's true intentions. However, when a popular girl in his classroom named Sayo Kyuragi starts flirting with him, he becomes bewildered and is thrown off his game.

== Characters ==
Azuma Matsuura (松浦吾妻, Matsuura Azuma)
Voiced by: Aoi Ichikawa (vomic)
Sayo Kyuragi (厳木紗代, Kyūragi Sayo)
Voiced by: Aoi Koga (vomic)

== Media ==
=== Manga ===
Written and illustrated by Akira Moriguchi, Stop! I'm Falling for You was originally published as a one-shot on Shueisha's Tonari no Young Jump on September 22, 2023. It later began serialization on the website on March 14, 2025. It also began serialization in the Weekly Young Jump magazine on February 5, 2026. Its chapters have been compiled into four tankōbon volumes as of August 2026.

The series' chapters are published in English on Shueisha's Manga Plus app.

| No. | Release date | ISBN |
|---|---|---|
| 1 | October 17, 2025 | 978-4-08-893745-8 |
| 2 | November 19, 2025 | 978-4-08-893840-0 |
| 3 | April 17, 2026 | 978-4-08-894094-6 |
| 4 | August 19, 2026 | 978-4-08-894198-1 |
| 5 | December 17, 2026 | 978-4-08-894413-5 |

=== Other ===
In commemoration of the release of the first volume, a voice comic adaptation was uploaded to the Young Jump Manga TV YouTube channel. The voice comic featured voice performances from Aoi Ichikawa and Aoi Koga.

== Reception ==
The series has been recommended by manga artist Yusei Matsui.

The series was ranked seventh in the print category at the twelfth Next Manga Awards in 2026.
