= Batuque (manga) =

Japanese manga series

- First tankōbon volume cover

バトゥーキ (Batūki)
- Genre: Action; Drama
- Manga
- Written by: Toshio Sako
- Published by: Shueisha
- English publisher: Shueisha (digital)
- Magazine: Weekly Young Jump (2018−2020); Tonari no Young Jump (2020−2024)
- Original run: July 5, 2018 – February 2, 2024
- Volumes: 18

Batuque (Japanese: バトゥーキ, Hepburn: Batūki) is a Japanese manga series written and illustrated by Toshio Sako. It was serialized in Shueisha's seinen manga magazine Weekly Young Jump from July 2018 to June 2020, and later moved to the Tonari no Young Jump website and the Young Jump app, where it ran from July 2020 to February 2024. Its chapters were collected into 18 tankōbon volumes.

== Plot ==
Ichiri Sanjou is a skate-boarding high-schooler who struggles with the limitations imposed on her by her parents. One day, she meets a man in a park and gets caught up in a convenience store robbery. The man, who appears homeless, is a Brazilian who practices Capoeira. Ichiri and her friends start learning Capoeira from him, and Ichiri quickly becomes good at it, enjoying both the fighting and the idea of freedom it represents. However, there is more going on beneath the surface than she realizes, as Ichiri begins to uncover secrets from her past, realizing that her family has hidden important truths about their origins.

== Characters ==
Ichiri Sanjou (三條 一里, Sanjō Ichiri)
The protagonist of the manga. Known by most by the nickname Icchi (いっち, Itchi). A first-year high school student at Hayatomo High School. After meeting a mysterious old man and learning capoeira from him, she became an ever-growing capoeirista thrust into the midst of an upcoming Inheritance War by B.J. She is the daughter of Isao Sanjou, the boss of the Brazilian mafia group Lança Mortal. Her apelido (nickname among capoeiristas) is Alegria (Joy).
Aruna (アルナ, Aruna)
Ichiri's adoptive mother. She was chosen by Bernardo Joker (B.J.) along with Pedro to adopt Ichiri Sanjou. However, she and Pedro ran away with Ichiri, fleeing from B.J. and Lança Mortal. Even after discovering that they were not biologically related to her, Ichiri still treats them as her family and is willing to put herself in danger to protect them.
Pedro (ペドゥロ, Peduro)
Ichiri's adoptive father, who is strict and severe but has a great soft side for Ichiri. He ran away with Aruna and Ichiri, fleeing from their old friend and organization and flying to Japan.
Isao Sanjou (三條 勲, Sanjō Isao)
The boss of Lança Mortal and the biological father of Aguri, Ichiri and Legba. He is widely praised as the living reincarnation of the legendary Besouro Mangangá. He is considered one of the most powerful criminals in Brazil, both in terms of territorial power and martial abilities. To the surprise of everyone in Lança Mortal, Isao announced his upcoming retirement and declared that only the fittest of his children would inherit his possessions, assets, and legacy, thus setting the stage for the Inheritance War.
Bernardo Joker (ベルナルド・ジョーカー, Berunarudo Jōkā) / B.J.
A member of Lança Mortal and the main antagonist of the story. Fueled by his hatred for his boss, who had his left leg cut off, B.J. decided to capture Ichiri and train her to become strong enough to participate in—and win—the Inheritance War set up by her biological father. This desire stemmed from B.J.'s longing for money, as it was the only thing that provided him comfort after his allies and organization betrayed and destroyed him. Ichiri has an antagonistic relationship with B.J., complying with his demands to ensure the safety of her adoptive parents.
Aguri (アグリ, Aguri)
A member of Lança Mortal and Isao Sanjou's eldest child. She is the half-sister of Ichiri Sanjou and Legba, who are born from different mothers. She is solely focused on killing Ichiri and Legba with no hesitation. Aguri expresses little to no sibling affection toward Ichiri, seeing her only as a nuisance that gets in the way of the Inheritance War.

== Publication ==
Written and illustrated by Toshio Sako, Batuque was serialized in Shueisha's seinen manga magazine Weekly Young Jump from July 5, 2018, to June 4, 2020. The series was moved to the Tonari no Young Jump web magazine and the Young Jump app starting on July 4, 2020, where it ran until its conclusion on February 2, 2024. Shueisha collected its chapters in eighteen tankōbon volumes, released from January 18, 2019, to March 18, 2024. Shueisha began publishing the manga in English on its Manga Million digital platform in 2026.

=== Volumes ===
No.	Japanese release date	Japanese ISBN
1	January 18, 2019	978-4-08-891144-1
2	January 18, 2019	978-4-08-891191-5
3	April 19, 2019	978-4-08-891280-6
4	July 19, 2019	978-4-08-891321-6
5	October 18, 2019	978-4-08-891396-4
6	January 17, 2020	978-4-08-891460-2
7	April 17, 2020	978-4-08-891528-9
8	July 17, 2020	978-4- 08-891602-6
9	November 19, 2020	978-4-08-891668-2
10	February 19, 2021	978-4-08-891778-8
11	July 16, 2021	978-4-08-891865-5
12	February 4, 2022	978-4-08-892075-7
13	June 17, 2022	978-4-08-892331-4
14	November 17, 2022	978-4-08-892496-0
15	April 18, 2023	978-4-08-892635-3
16	July 19, 2023	978-4-08-892812-8
17	January 18, 2024	978-4-08-893084-8
18	March 18, 2024	978-4-08-893134-0

== See also ==
- Genikasuri, another manga series written by Toshio Sako
- Usogui, another manga series written by Toshio Sako
