= Weekly Young Jump =

Japanese manga magazine

- First cover of Young Jump, featuring Mac Bear
- Categories: Seinen manga
- Frequency: Weekly
- Circulation: 210,273; (July–September 2026)
- Publisher: Shueisha
- Founded: May 17, 1979
- Country: Japan
- Based in: Tokyo
- Language: Japanese
- Website: Official website

Weekly Young Jump (Japanese: 週刊ヤングジャンプ, Hepburn: Shūkan Yangu Janpu) is a Japanese seinen manga magazine published by Shueisha. Launched in May 1979, it is published under Shueisha's Jump line of magazines. The chapters of series that run in Weekly Young Jump are collected and published in tankōbon volumes under the "Young Jump Comics" imprint every four months. Many of the featured series are known to contain heavy violence and a fair amount of sexual content. Photos of gravure idols are typically featured on the cover, with additional photos inside. The magazine is headquartered in Tokyo.

== History ==
Young Jump was launched as a biweekly magazine on May 17, 1979, and switched to a weekly release schedule in 1981. The "young" in its name denotes its target demographic as a seinen manga magazine, aimed at young adult men. In 2008, an offshoot issue similar to Monthly Shōnen Jump was released called Monthly Young Jump; the magazine was rebranded as Miracle Jump in 2011, and was suspended in 2017.

A spin-off website, titled Tonari no Young Jump (となりのヤングジャンプ, Tonari no Yangu Janpu), debuted on June 14, 2012, starting with Yusuke Murata's remake of One's series One-Punch Man.

Beginning with Bungo: Unreal on October 9, 2025, Shueisha announced that every new manga series launched in Weekly Young Jump would receive a simultaneous worldwide digital release on their Manga Plus platform.

== Features ==
=== Series ===
There are 26 manga titles being regularly serialized in Weekly Young Jump.

Series title	Author	Premiered	Ref.
4Gun-Kun (Kari) (4軍くん(仮))	Yuuji Moritaka, Hikari Suehiro	August 2022	
Batsu Hare (バツハレ)	Minori Inaba	March 2022	
Bungo: Unreal	Yūji Ninomiya	October 2025	
Catenaccio (カテナチオ)	Daisuke Morimoto	October 2022	
Dogsred (ドッグスレッド)	Satoru Noda	July 2023	
Enigmatica (エニグマティカ)	Shiba Kanji	February 2026	
Gaslight Stray Dog Detectives (ガス灯野良犬探偵団, Gas-tō Norainu Tanteidan)	Yugo Aosaki, Toshimitsu Matsubara	August 2023	
Genikasuri (げにかすり)	Toshio Sako	February 2025	
Goodbye My Idol (さよなら僕のアイドル, Sayonara Boku no Idol)	Yuta Ito	November 2025	
Haunted Peak (山劇, Sangeki)	Ryo Minenami	April 2026	
Ilios (イリオス)	Masaki Enjoji	April 2022	
Junket Bank (ジャンケットバンク)	Ikko Tanaka	July 2020	
Kami Kill (カミキル)	Kazuya Konomoto, Ryo Yamasaki	August 2025	
Kingdom (キングダム)	Yasuhisa Hara	January 2006	
Monkey Hunting (モンキーハンティング)	Jama Riki, Masuda Toshinari, Hiraoka Koushi	August 2026	
Noa-senpai wa Tomodachi (のあ先輩はともだち。)	Enma Akiyama	July 2023	
Real (リアル)	Takehiko Inoue	October 1999	
Salamander (サラマンダ)	Nakayama Atsushi	September 2026	
Shadows House (シャドーハウス)	Somato	September 2018	
So You Weren't Into Me?! (私のこと好きじゃなかったのかよ!?, Watashi no Koto Suki ja Nakatta no ka yo!?)	Wakame Konbu	February 2026	
Soon, You'll Paint Your Heart Out (やがて絵筆を映ろし君は, Yagate Efude o Utsuroshi Kimi wa)	Neguse Okita	December 2025	
Stop! I'm Falling for You (やめろ好きになってしまう, Yamero Suki ni Natteshimau)	Akira Moriguchi	March 2026	
Terra Formars (テラフォーマーズ)	Yū Sasuga, Kenichi Tachibana	September 2011	
The 100 Girlfriends Who Really, Really, Really, Really, Really Love You (君のことが大大大大大好きな100人の彼女)	Rikito Nakamura, Yukiko Nozawa	December 2019	
The Days of Diamond (ダイヤモンドの 功罪, Daiyamondo no Kōzai)	Ōhashi Hirai	February 2023	
We're J-Just Childhood Friends (おさななななじみ, Osananananajimi)	Nene Yukimori	July 2025	

== Former series ==
=== 1970s–1980s ===
- Hanappe Bazooka (花平バズーカ, Hanappe Bazūka) by Kazuo Koike (story) and Go Nagai (art) (1979–1982)
- Neko Janai mon! (ネコじゃないモン!) by Kentarō Yano (1982–1985)
- Minna Agechau (みんなあげちゃう) by Hikaru Yuzuki (1982–1987)
- Osu! Karate Club (押忍!!空手部, Osu!! Karate-bu)) by Koji Takahashi (1985–1996)
- Mad Bull 34 (マッド★ブル34, Maddo Buru Sanjūyon) by Kazuo Koike (story) and Noriyoshi Inoue (art) (1985–1991)
- Kujaku Ō (孔雀王) by Makoto Ogino (1985–1989)
- Nozomi Witches (のぞみ♡ウィッチィズ, Nozomi Wicchīzu) by Toshio Nobe (1986–1996)
- Nineteen 19 by Sho Kitagawa (1988–1990)
- Shōnen Ashibe (少年アシベ) by Hiromi Morishita (1988–1994)
- Hen (変) by Hiroya Oku (1989–1994)

=== 1990s ===
- Kujaku Ō: Taimaseiden (孔雀王 退魔聖伝) by Makoto Ogino (1990–1992)
- B.B. Fish (B.B.フィッシュ, B. B. Fisshu)) by Sho Kitagawa (1990–1994)
- MazinSaga (マジンサーガ, Majinsāga) by Go Nagai (1991–1992)
- Kirara by Toshiki Yui (1993–1997)
- High School Exciting Story: Tough (高校鉄拳伝タフ, Kōkō Tekken-den Tough) by Tetsuya Saruwatari (1993–2003)
- My Dear Marie (ぼくのマリー, Boku no Marī) by Sakura Takeuchi (1994–1997)
- Salary Man Kintaro (サラリーマン金太郎, Sararīman Kintarō) by Hiroshi Motomiya (1994–2002)
- Hen by Hiroya Oku (1995–1997)
- Demon Fighter Kocho (厄災仔寵, Yakusai Kochō) (1995–1997)
- Colorful by Torajirō Kishi (1997–2000)
- Hotman (ホットマン, Hottoman)) by Sho Kitagawa (1997–2000)
- Samurai Gun (サムライガン, Samurai Gan) by Kazuhiro Kumagai (1997–2002)

=== 2000s ===
- Gantz by Hiroya Oku (2000–2013)
- Arcana by Yua Kotegawa (2000–2001)
- ComaGoma by Hiromi Morishita (2000–2004)
- Captain Tsubasa Road to 2002 (キャプテン翼 ROAD TO 2002) by Yōichi Takahashi (2000–2004)
- Addicted to Curry (華麗なる食卓, Karēnaru Shokutaku) by Kazuki Funatsu (2001–2012)
- Skyhigh (スカイハイ, Sukai Hai) by Tsutomu Takahashi (2001–2002)
- Oku-sama wa Joshi Kōsei (おくさまは女子高生) by Hiyoko Kobayashi (2001–2007)
- Elfen Lied (エルフェンリート, Erufen Rīto) by Lynn Okamoto (2002–2005)
- Blue Heaven by Tsutomu Takahashi (2002)
- Kuni ga Moeru (国が燃える) by Hiroshi Motomiya (2002–2005)
- Zetman by Masakazu Katsura (2002–2014)
- Skyhigh: Karma (スカイハイ カルマ, Sukai Hai Karuma) by Tsutomu Takahashi (2003)
- Kappa no Kaikata (カッパの飼い方) by Yūgo Ishikawa (2003–2010)
- Tough by Tetsuya Saruwatari (2003–2012)
- Girl Friend (ガールフレンド, Gaaru Furendo) by Masaya Hokazono (story) and Betten Court (art) (2003–2007)
- Skyhigh: Shinshō (スカイハイ 新章, Sukai Hai Shinshō) by Tsutomu Takahashi (2003–2004)
- B Gata H Kei (B型H系, Bī Gata Etchi Kei) by Yōko Sanri (2004–2011)
- Inubaka: Crazy for Dogs (いぬばか, Inubaka) by Yukiya Sakuragi (2004–2009); transferred to Monthly Young Jump
- Liar Game by Shinobu Kaitani (2005–2015)
- Sidooh by Tsutomu Takahashi (2005–2010)
- Gimmick! (ギミック!, Gimikku!) by Yōzaburō Kanari (story) and Kuroko Yabuguchi (art) (2005–2007)
- Captain Tsubasa: Golden-23 (キャプテン翼 GOLDEN-23) by Yōichi Takahashi (2005–2008)
- Kujaku Ō: Magarigamiki (孔雀王 曲神紀) by Makoto Ogino (2006–2009); transferred to Monthly Young Jump
- Usogui (嘘喰い) by Toshio Sako (2006–2017)
- Kamen Teacher (仮面ティーチャー, Kamen Tīchā) by Tooru Fujisawa (2006–2007)
- Me-teru no Kimochi (め～てるの気持ち) by Hiroya Oku (2006–2007)
- 81diver (ハチワンダイバー, Hachi Wan Daibā) by Yokusaru Shibata (2006–2014)
- Beshari-Gurashi (べしゃり暮らし) by Masanori Morita (2007–2019); transferred from Weekly Shōnen Jump
- Kaze ga Tsuyoku Fuiteiru (風が強く吹いている) by Shion Miura (original story) and Sorata Unno (art) (2007–2009)
- Nononono (ノノノノ) by Lynn Okamoto (2007–2010)
- The Climber (孤高の人, Kokō no Hito) by Shin-ichi Sakamoto (story and art), Yoshio Nabeta (story), and Hiroshi Takano (story) (2007–2011)
- Rozen Maiden (ローゼンメイデン, Rōzen Meiden) by Peach-Pit (2008–2014)
- Shin Salaryman Kintarō (新サラリーマン金太郎, Shin Sararīman Kintarō) by Hiroshi Motomiya (2009–2011)
- Captain Tsubasa: Kaigai Gekitō-hen – In Calcio (キャプテン翼 海外激闘編 IN CALCIO) by Yōichi Takahashi (2009)
- Jiya by Akira Toriyama (story) and Masakazu Katsura (art) (2009–2010)

=== 2010s ===
- Delivery Cinderella (デリバリーシンデレラ, Deribarī Shinderera) by NON (2010–2012)
- Hibi Rock (日々ロック, Hibi Rokku) by Katsumasa Enokiya (2010–2015)
- Captain Tsubasa: Kaigai Gekitō-hen – En La Liga (キャプテン翼 海外激闘編 EN LA LIGA) by Yōichi Takahashi (2010–2012)
- Destroy and Revolution (デストロイ アンド レボリューション, Desutoroi ando Reboryūshon) by Kouji Mori (2010–2016)
- Cyclops Shōjo Saipu (サイクロプス少女さいぷ〜) by Yasu Tora (2011–2014)
- Sidooh: Sunrise by Tsutomu Takahashi (2011)
- Supinamarada! (スピナマラダ!) by Satoru Noda (2011–2012)
- Tokyo Ghoul (東京喰種, Tōkyō Gūru) by Sui Ishida (2011–2014)
- Minamoto-kun Monogatari (源君物語) by Minori Inaba (2011–2019)
- Papa no Iukoto o Kikinasai!: Rojō Kansatsu Kenkyū Nisshi (パパのいうことを聞きなさい!〜路上観察研究日誌〜) by Tomohiro Matsu (original story) and Miyano Hirotsugu (2011–2012)
- Hito Hitori Futari (ヒトヒトリフタリ) by Tsutomu Takahashi (2011–2013)
- Kimi wa Midara na Boku no Joō (君は淫らな僕の女王) by Lynn Okamoto (story) and Mengo Yokoyari (art) (2012–2017)
- Brynhildr in the Darkness (極黒のブリュンヒルデ, Gokukoku no Buryunhirude) by Lynn Okamoto (2012–2016)
- Innocent (イノサン, Inosan) by Shin-ichi Sakamoto (2013–2015)
- Himōto! Umaru-chan (干物妹!うまるちゃん) by Sankaku Head (2013–2017)
- Kamen Teacher Black (仮面ティーチャーBLACK, Kamen Tīchā Burakku) by Tooru Fujisawa (2013–2014)
- Gunjō Senki (群青戦記) by Masaki Kasahara (2013–2017)
- Hamatora (ハマトラ) by Yukino Kitajima (story) and Yūki Kodama (art) (2013–2014)
- Boku Girl (ボクガール, Boku Gāru) by Akira Sugito (2013–2016)
- All You Need Is Kill by Hiroshi Sakurazaka (original story), Ryōsuke Takeuchi (story) and Takeshi Obata (art) (2014)
- Yokai Girls (妖怪少女―モンスガ―, Yōkai Shōjo ―Monsuga―) by Kazuki Funatsu (2014–2017)
- Rikudō (リクドウ) by Toshimitsu Matsubara (2014–2019)
- Golden Kamuy (ゴールデンカムイ, Gōruden Kamui) by Satoru Noda (2014–2022)
- Tokyo Ghoul:re (東京喰種:re, Tōkyō Gūru:re) by Sui Ishida (2014–2018)
- 87 Clockers by Tomoko Ninomiya (2014–2016); transferred from Jump X
- Bungo by Yūji Ninomiya (2014–2024)
- Clean Freak! Aoyama-kun (潔癖男子！青山くん, Keppeki Danshi! Aoyama-kun) by Taku Sakamoto (2015–2018); transferred from Miracle Jump
- Yokokuhan: The Copycat (予告犯 -THE COPYCAT-, Yokokuhan za Kopīkyatto) by Tetsuya Tsutsui (story) and Fumio Obata (art) (2015); transferred from Jump X
- Gravuretry (グラビアトリ, Gurabiatori) by Kakeru Sato (2015–2016)
- Ginga Eiyū Densetsu (銀河英雄伝説) by Yoshiki Tanaka (original story) and Ryu Fujisaki (art) (2015–2020); transferred to Ultra Jump
- Kaguya-sama: Love Is War (かぐや様は告らせたい〜天才たちの恋愛頭脳戦〜, Kaguya-sama wa Kokurasetai Tensai-tachi no Ren'ai Zunōsen) by Aka Akasaka (2016–2022); transferred from Miracle Jump
- Yuizaki-san wa Nageru! (結崎さんはなげる!) by Yūma Kagami (2016–2017)
- Black Night Parade (ブラックナイトパレード, Burakku Naito Parēdo) by Hikaru Nakamura (2016–2019); transferred to Ultra Jump
- Finder: Kyoto Jogakuin Monogatari (ファインダー ―京都女学院物語―, Faindā Kyoto Jogakuin Monogatari) by Osamu Akimoto (2017–2018)
- Snack Basue (スナックバス江) by Forbidden Shibukawa (2019–2025)
- Himouto! Umaru-chan G (干物妹!うまるちゃんG) by Sankaku Head (2017–2018)
- Hoshin Engi Gaiden (封神演義 外伝) by Ryu Fujisaki (2018)
- Libidors (リビドーズ, Ribidōzu) by Masaki Kasahara (2018–2020)
- Batuque (バトゥーキ, Batūki) by Toshio Sako (2018–2020); transferred to Tonari no Young Jump
- Shin Sakura Taisen the Comic (新サクラ大戦 the Comic) by Koyuri Noguchi (2019–2020)
- Kubo Won't Let Me Be Invisible (久保さんは僕を許さない, Kubo-san wa Mobu o Yurusanai) by Nene Yukimori (2019–2023)
- Kowloon Generic Romance (九龍ジェネリックロマンス) by Jun Mayuzuki (2019–2026)

=== 2020s ===
- Gantz: E by Hiroya Oku (story) and Jin Kagetsu (art) (2020–2023); transferred to YanJan!
- Boy's Abyss (少年のアビス) by Ryō Minenami (2020–2024)
- Oshi no Ko (【推しの子】) by Aka Akasaka (story) and Mengo Yokoyari (art) (2020–2024)
- Umamusume: Cinderella Gray (ウマ娘 シンデレラグレイ) by Cygames, Junnosuke Itou, Masafumi Sugiura, and Taiyou Kusumi (2020–2025)
- Stand Up Start (スタンドUPスタート, Sutando Appu Sutāto) by Shū Fukuda (2020–2023)
- Shin Gunjō Senki (真・群青戦記) by Masaki Kasahara (2021–2022)
- Ōritsu Mahō Gakuen no Saikasei: Slum Agari no Saikyō Mahōshi, Kizoku darake no Gakuen de Musōsuru (王立魔法学園の最下生～貧困街〈スラム〉上がりの最強魔法師、貴族だらけの学園で無双する～) by Yusura Kankitsu (story) and Fumi Nagatsuki (art) (2021–2025)
- Valhallian the Black Iron (黒鉄のヴァルハリアン, Kurogane no Vuaruharian) by Toshimitsu Matsubara (2021–2022)
- Choujin X (超人X, Chōjin Ekkusu) by Sui Ishida (2021–2022); publication continued on Tonari no Young Jump
- Joyū Meshi (女優めし) by Yotsuba Fujikawa (story) and Nono Ueno (art) (2022–2025)
- Katagimodoshi (カタギモドシ) by Kiyoto Shitara (2022–2023)
- Shin no Yasuragi wa Kono Yo ni Naku: Shin Kamen Rider – Shocker Side (真の安らぎはこの世になく -シン・仮面ライダー SHOCKER SIDE-) by Akeji Fujimura (2022–2025)
- Renai Daikō (恋愛代行) by Aka Akasaka (story) and Nishizawa 5mm (art) (2023–2024)
- Josei Senyō (女性専用。) by Honami Uchida (story) and Miyama (art) (2023–2025)
- Aiseki Ii desu ka? (相席いいですか?) by Daishirō Kawakami (2023–2025)
- Iron Familia (アイアンファミリア) by Tatsumaru (2023–2025)
- Havira Senki (ハヴィラ戦記) by Minosuke (2024–2026)
- Nasakenai ze Mōri (なさけないぜ毛利) by Mae Ueto (2024–2025)
- Owaranai Yosuga (終わらないヨスガ) by Satoru Tatsukawa (story) and Suzuhira Hashimoto (art) (2024–2025)
- Slow Life Ieyasu (スローライフ家康) by Jō Taketsuki (story) and Tsunehiro Date (art) (2024–2025)
- Misao no Keiyaku (操の契約) by Yū Yamanouchi (2024–2025)
- Gal Amida Butsu (ギャルアミダブツ) by Kogamo Shinagawa (2024–2025)
- Nito no Joreishi (二兎の除霊師) by Hiromi Ichikawa (2024–2026)
- Kabushikigaisha Ninkai Shōji (株式会社忍界商事) by Mae Ueto (2024–2025)
- Enma (えんま) by Hiroshi Motomiya (2025)
- Märchen Crown (メルヘンクラウン) by Aka Akasaka, Aoi Kujira, Azychika (2025–2026)
- Punk Gun (パンクガン) by Oki Naoki (2025–2026)
- Tatsuki to Tamaki (タツキとタマキ) by Yuma Yoshida (2025–2026)
- Geki-dou (ゲキドウ) by Kokokako, Misumi Sumi (2025–2026)

== Special issues ==
=== Miracle Jump ===
Miracle Jump (ミラクルジャンプ, Mirakuru Janpu) is a spin-off issue of Weekly Young Jump, first published in January 2011. It includes one shots and Weekly Young Jump series' side stories, and a series that only serializes in Miracle Jump. Initially, it was scheduled to release bimonthly until June 25, 2013. From April 15, 2014, it was changed into monthly releases, and the number of serializations has increased ever since.

=== Young Jump Gold ===
Young Jump Gold (ヤングジャンプGOLD, Yan Janpu Gorudo) is a spin-off issue of Weekly Young Jump, first published in July 2017. It includes one shots and Weekly Young Jump series' side stories.

=== Young Jump Battle ===
Shueisha launched a spin-off magazine called Young Jump Battle in October 2019. It focuses on manga from the battle manga genre. The first issue will have five one-shots from Young Jump mangaka.

=== Young Jump Love ===
A spin-off focused on romance manga called Young Jump Love launched on December 23, 2019.

== Circulation ==
Year / Period	Weekly circulation	Magazine sales (est.)	Sales revenue (est.)	Issue price
1986	1,600,000	83,200,000	¥14,976,000,000	¥180
1987	1,860,000	96,720,000	¥17,409,600,000	¥180
1988	2,000,000	104,000,000	¥18,720,000,000	¥180
1989 to 1991	2,100,000	327,600,000	¥58,968,000,000	¥180
1992	1,900,000	98,800,000	¥18,772,000,000	¥190
1993	1,850,000	96,200,000	¥18,278,000,000	¥190
1994	1,900,000	98,800,000	¥20,748,000,000	¥210
1995	2,020,000	105,040,000	¥22,058,400,000	¥210
1996	1,940,000	100,880,000	¥21,184,800,000	¥210
1997	1,970,000	102,440,000	¥21,512,400,000	¥210
1998	1,750,000	91,000,000	¥19,110,000,000	¥210
1999	1,600,000	83,200,000	¥17,472,000,000	¥210
2000	1,450,000	75,400,000	¥15,834,000,000	¥210
2001	1,470,000	76,440,000	¥16,052,400,000	¥210
2002	1,400,000	72,800,000	¥15,288,000,000	¥210
2003	1,160,000	60,320,000	¥12,667,200,000	¥210
2004	1,136,666	59,106,632	¥12,412,392,720	¥210
2005	1,081,459	56,235,868	¥13,496,608,320	¥240
2006	1,006,875	52,357,500	¥12,565,800,000	¥240
2007	967,250	50,297,000	¥12,071,280,000	¥240
2008	939,896	48,874,592	¥11,729,902,080	¥240
2009	852,938	44,352,776	¥10,644,666,240	¥240
2010	768,980	39,986,960	¥9,596,870,400	¥240
January 2011 to September 2011	705,405	27,510,795	¥6,602,590,800	¥240
October 2011 to September 2012	656,250	34,125,000	¥8,190,000,000	¥240
October 2012 to September 2013	609,375	31,687,500	¥7,605,000,000	¥240
October 2013 to September 2014	596,667	31,026,684	¥7,446,404,160	¥240
October 2014 to September 2015	576,250	29,965,000	¥7,191,600,000	¥240
October 2015 to September 2016	557,143	28,971,436	¥6,953,144,640	¥240
October 2016 to September 2017	536,979	27,922,908	¥6,701,497,920	¥240
October 2017 to September 2018	517,813	26,926,276	¥6,462,306,240	¥240
1986 to September 2018	1,328,354	2,262,186,927	¥468,720,863,520 ($5.705 billion)	¥207
