= List of Goblin Slayer volumes =

Goblin Slayer is a Japanese dark fantasy light novel series written by Kumo Kagyu and illustrated by Noboru Kannatuki. A manga adaptation by Kōsuke Kurose is serialized in the Monthly Big Gangan magazine, and a second adaptation by Masahiro Ikeno runs in the same magazine. A prequel manga by Kento Eida runs in Young Gangan. Both the novels and the manga adaptations have been licensed by North American publisher Yen Press. Three audio drama CDs have been released, bundled with the fourth, sixth, seventh, and eighth light novels.

== Light novels ==
The light novels are written by Kumo Kagyu and illustrated by Noboru Kannatsuki. The series was originally published online. SB Creative published the first volume under their GA Bunko imprint on February 15, 2016. Sixteen volumes have been released in Japan so far.

A spin-off novel written by Kagyu and illustrated by Shingo Adachi, titled Goblin Slayer Side Story: Year One (ゴブリンスレイヤー外伝：イヤーワン, Goburin Sureiyā Gaiden: Iyā Wan), published the first volume on March 15, 2018. It is a prequel series that reveals Goblin Slayer's past and the events that led him to become an adventurer with the sole purpose of exterminating all goblins from the world.

Kagyu released a second spinoff, titled Goblin Slayer Side Story II: Dai Katana (ゴブリンスレイヤー外伝2 鍔鳴の太刀《ダイ・カタナ》, Goburin Sureiyā Gaiden 2: Tsubanari no Daikatana), in the Gangan GA online magazine. The series ran for nine chapter and was collected into three volumes.

The fourth volume of the light novel included an original audio drama CD written by Kagyu, as did the sixth, seventh, and eighth volumes.

Yen Press licensed the novels for publication in North America, and released the first volume in English on December 20, 2016. Yen Press has also licensed the Year One and Dai Katana spinoffs.

=== Goblin Slayer ===
No.	Original release date	Original ISBN	English release date	English ISBN
1	February 15, 2016	978-4-7973-8615-8	December 20, 2016	978-0-316-50159-0
1. "The Fate of Some Adventurers"; Interlude: "The Gods"; 2. "Cow Girl's Day"; 3. "Guild Girl's Reflections"; 4. "The Mountain Fortress Burns"; Interlude: "Guild Girl"; 5. "Unexpected Visitors"; Interlude: "The Heavy Warrior"; 6. "Traveling Companions"; 7. "Goblin Slayer"; 8. Nihongo; 9. "Goblin Slaying"; 10. "The Strong Ones"; Interlude: "The Hero"; 11. "Dozing"; 12. "A Party of Adventurers"; 13. "Over the Goblins' Hill"; 14. "The Fate of an Adventurer"
Priestess, having just become an adventurer, joins a group of low-level adventurers on a goblin slaying quest. However, the group being annihilated by goblins, Priestess cowers in fear until she is rescued by Goblin Slayer. Together, they kill all the goblins and the children in the nest. Priestess stays together with Goblin Slayer to take on further goblin-slaying quests. Goblin Slayer is later spotted by a group of silver-ranked adventurers (High Elf Archer, Dwarf Shaman and Lizard Priest) who offer a quest to eliminate a goblin nest in elf lands. Along with Priestess, they form a party and head to the nest. After eliminating the goblin nest, they battle an ogre which Goblin Slayer triumphs. A few months later, a goblin horde led by a goblin lord plans to raid Cow Girl's farm. Goblin Slayer rallies the adventurers to battle the goblin horde at night while Goblin Slayer and Priestess battle and win against the goblin lord.
2	May 14, 2016	978-4-7973-8752-0	April 18, 2017	978-0-316-55322-3
1. "Adventures and Daily Life"; Interlude: "Of the Gods Making Merry"; 2. "Goblin Slayer in the Water Town"; Interlude: "Of the Two of Them, Then"; 3. "Random Encounter"; Interlude: "Of the Young King"; 4. "Between Adventures"; 5. "Onward Unto Death"; 6. "Riddles"; 7. "Whispers and Prayers and Chants"; Interlude: "Of an Adventurer Quite Meddling with Other Adventurers"; 8. "A Moment's Rest"; Interlude: "Of the Slaying of the Evil Sect"; 9. "The Monster That Must Not Be Named"; 10. "City Ruins and Magical Traps"; 11. "There and Back Again"
3	September 15, 2016	978-4-7973-8834-3	August 22, 2017	978-0-316-55323-0
1. "Harvest Moon"; Interlude: "Of a Surprisingly Troublesome Woman"; 2. "Festival's Eve"; Interlude: "Of Concern Over This Year's Offering"; 3. "The Harvest Festival Brings Dreams"; Interlude: "Of the Mother Superior's Preparations for the Festival"; 4. "It's Your Smile That Matters"; Interlude: "Of the Gods' Creating a New Scenario"; 5. "A Scenario Overturned"; Interlude: "Of the Mastermind, Quite Full of Himself Behind the Scenes"; 6. "Seven Powers"; Interlude: "Of the Honored Hero and Her First Hail Mary Attack"; 7. "Cherish the Simple Days"
4	January 14, 2017	978-4-7973-8955-5; 978-4-7973-8956-2 (LE)	December 19, 2017	978-0-316-41188-2
1. "Of Rookie Warrior and Apprentice Priestess"; 2. "Of a Certain Little Boy"; 3. "Of the Tavern Waitress"; 4. "Of a Perfectly Ordinary Goblin Nest"; 5. "Of a Day When He Isn't There"; 6. "Of the Destruction of the Demon-Enthralled Temple of Doom"; 7. "Of the Second Time the Necromancer's Plans Were Upset"; 8. "Of an Elf's Lazy Day"; 9. "Of the Three of Them, Some Months Ago"; 10. "Of Going There and Back Again"
A series of short stories starring Goblin Slayer and different characters.
5	May 15, 2017	978-4-7973-9158-9	September 18, 2018	978-1-9753-2648-7
1. "Tutorial"; 2. "Mass Combat"; 3. "Hack and Slash"; 4. "Rebuild"; Interlude: "Of Those Who Were Waiting"; 5. "Dungeon Raid"; 6. "Goblins' Crown"; Interlude: "Of the Gods Breathing a Sigh of Relief"; 7. "After Session—a New Dawn"
Goblin Slayer and his group of adventurers take on a quest to rescue Noble Fencer who had taken on a goblin-slaying quest in the Northern Mountains. After repelling a goblin attack at a village and tending to the villagers, they blitz a goblin den at dawn where they discover a chapel and Noble Fencer. They also discover that a separate nest was also formed which was raised by goblin paladin. Re-grouping at the village, the adventurers along with Noble Fencer enter the mountain fortress where they rescue the prisoners, destroy the goblin's supplies and kill some goblins. Being chased down the mountain by a crazed group of goblins led by goblin paladin, Goblin Slayer defeats goblin paladin while Noble Fencer eliminates the group of goblins. In the new year, while adventurers celebrate at the frontier village, Goblin Slayer defends alone in case of a goblin attack.
6	September 15, 2017	978-4-7973-9159-6; 978-4-7973-9160-2 (LE)	January 22, 2019	978-1-9753-2784-2
1. "An Ordinary Spring Day"; 2. "The Red-Haired Wizard Boy"; 3. "Magical Resources"; Interlude: "Of Two Women"; 4. "The Men With Two Names"; 5. "The Training Field On The Edge of Town; 6. "To Each Their Own Battle"; Interlude: "Of the Hero Who Went There and Back Again"; 7. "Onward to Adventure"
7	March 15, 2018	978-4-7973-9161-9; 978-4-7973-9529-7 (LE)	May 21, 2019	978-1-9753-3078-1
1. "A Handout For Her"; Interlude "Of How the Girls' Slow Reactions Are to Blame"; 2. "Beard-Cutter Goes To The Southern River"; 3. "The Forest of the Elf King"; 4. "The Fight With The Beast"; Interlude "Of a Flash of Inspiration at the Library"; 5. "Jungle Cruise"; 6. "Heart of Darkness"; 7. "Cleanse the Blood"; Interlude "Of Hell Smacking Down into the Abyss"; 8. "A Midsummer Night's Dream"
8	October 15, 2018	978-4-7973-9809-0; 978-4-7973-9808-3 (LE)	September 24, 2019	978-1-9753-3178-8
1. "The Prime of Youth, Now Ashes " 2. "Beard-Cutter Goes to the Southern Sea " 3. "The Slayer of Goblins Goes to the Capital"; Interlude "Of the Hoyden Who Wanted to Go on an Adventure "; 4. "City Adventure"; Interlude "Of How There Is No Use Crying over Spilled Milk "; 5. "Master Scene: Behind-the-Scenes Actors "; Interlude "Of Wondering Whose Master Scene It Had Been"; 6. "The Princess's Ordeal"; 7. "The Pulse of Demonbirth"; Interlude "Of How Cosmic Horror Is Not the Enemy of Swords and Sorcery"; 8. "The Heart of the Maelstrom"; 9. "Goblin Hand, Sign of Destruction"; Interlude "Of How It's Better Than Dragon Slaying, Probably "; 10. "O My Prayers, Have You Reached Heaven?"
9	December 14, 2018	978-4-7973-9812-0; 978-4-7973-9811-3 (LE)	January 28, 2020	978-1-9753-3180-1
1. "A Premonition of Destruction"; 2. "Wandering Goblin Slayer"; Interlude "Of the Hoyden Who Wanted to Go on an Adventure "; 3. "Fleet of Foot"; 4. "Assassin in the Ruined Village"; Interlude "Of How Goblins Are Unsuited for Command"; 5. "In the Cave, A Monster's Shadow"; 6. "Rings in the Pocket"; 7. "The Cave of the Ice Witch"; 8. "Goblin Slayer, Into the Maelstrom"; Interlude "Of Just Before the World Was Saved, Somehow"; 9. "Finally, to Daily Life"
10	March 15, 2019	978-4-8156-0095-2; 978-4-8156-0094-5 (LE)	August 25, 2020	978-1-9753-1403-3
1. "Storm Front"; 2. "Ghouls and Ghosts"; 3. "Roguelike"; Interlude "Of How Everyone Does Their Own Thing"; Pause "Of Running Through the Shadows of the Capital"; 4. "A Word from Our Sponsors"; 5. "Tower Defense"; Interlude "Of How Everyone is Fighting for Their Lives"; 6. "Those Who Love Neither Wine nor Women nor Song"
11	September 13, 2019	978-4-8156-0330-4	March 23, 2021	978-1-9753-2252-6
Pause "A Rogue's Run"; 1. "A Pounding Heart"; 2. "Freeway Warrior"; Interlude "Mud and Stars and Captives"; 3. "Choose Your Own Adventure"; Interlude "The Great Game Master's Scene"; 4. "The Anastasis from Gehenna"; Interlude "Princess of Persia"; 5. "Goblin Slayer in the Country of Sand"; Interlude "No Hit No Run"; 6. "Never Ever Cut a Deal With a Dragon"; 7. "One Jump Ahead"; Pause "A New Hope"
12	February 14, 2020	978-4-8156-0332-8	July 27, 2021	978-1-9753-2502-2
Prologue "Starting a Campaign"; 1. "Of When Your Right in the Middle of an Adventure and a Wyvern Shows Up"; 2. "Of How Girls Want to Go on Adventures Too"; Interlude "Of a Gift From a Younger Sister"; 3. "Hit and Run"; 4. "Of Wintertime Preparation"; Interlude "Of a Council with the King and His Advisors"; 5. "Of What Problem There Could Possibly Be with a Human Fighter"; 6. "Li'l Hero vs. the Undead King; Epilogue "Of Starting a Goblin-Hunting Scenario"
13	October 15, 2020	978-4-8156-0640-4	November 16, 2021	978-1-9753-3349-2
1. "I Wanna Be an Adventurer"; 2. "Dungeon Master's Guide"; 3. "I Don't Care, I Still Love Adventures!"; Interlude "Of How Starting Stats Are Not That Important"; 4. "I'm Not Afraid of Any Deathtrap Dungeon!"; Interlude "Of How There's More to It Than Just Lobbing Fireballs and Slinging Lightning Bolts, but It's Still Good If You Can Do Those Things"; 5. "A Professional Goblin Slayer"; Interlude "Of Starting with Saving the World"; 6. "I Still Wanna Be an Adventurer!"
14	March 12, 2021	978-4-8156-0812-5; 978-4-8156-0811-8 (LE)	August 23, 2022	978-1-9753-4559-4
1. "To What Shall We Compare the Heart?"; 2. "Over the Misty Mountains"; 3. "The Faraway Princess"; 4. "Game of Thrones"; Interlude "Of How the World Keeps Turning Even If You Can't See It Yourself"; 5. "Vikings"; 6. "Deep Rising"; 7. "Honey Moon"; 8. "A Slice of Bread, a Knife, and a Lamp"
15	September 14, 2021	978-4-8156-1152-1; 978-4-8156-1192-7 (LE)	January 17, 2023	978-1-9753-5017-8
1. "Rescue the Princess!"; 2. "Stay Away From Goblins"; Interlude "One Mustn't Lose to a Worthy Opponent"; 3. "Find Silver Blaze!"; Interlude "Be Careful of Your Contacts"; 4. "Flush Out the Mastermind!"; Interlude "Corner the Assassin!"; 5. "Leave It to an Adventurer!"
16	July 14, 2022	978-4-8156-1346-4	November 28, 2023	978-1-9753-7697-0
Prologue "A Knight's Tale"; 1. "A Vacation in the Capital"; Interlude "They're the Ones Who Will Die"; 2. "They Call Me"; Interlude "Coming to Adventure"; 3. "Cool Running"; 4. "Rock You!"; Interlude "Your Eyes Only"; Epilogue "It's a Wonderful Life!"

=== Side stories ===
==== Goblin Slayer Side Story: Year One ====
No.	Original release date	Original ISBN	English release date	English ISBN
1	March 15, 2018	978-4-7973-9041-4	October 30, 2018	978-1-9753-0284-9
2	November 15, 2018	978-4-7973-9810-6	July 23, 2019	978-1-9753-5763-4
3	December 15, 2022	978-4-7973-9810-6	April 16, 2024	978-1-9753-0627-4
4	September 14, 2024	978-4-8156-2491-0	January 13, 2026	979-8-8554-2227-6

==== Goblin Slayer Side Story II: Dai Katana ====
No.	Original release date	Original ISBN	English release date	English ISBN
1	August 9, 2019	978-4-7973-9835-9	December 15, 2020	978-1-9753-1823-9
1. "Step I: Red Blade of Doom"; 2. "Step II: Wire-Frame Proving Grounds"; 3. "Step III: Bushwhackers and Highwaymen"
2	November 12, 2020	978-4-8156-0368-7	July 13, 2021	978-1-9753-3353-9
1. "Step IV: Critical Hit of the Tiger"; 2. "Step V: Trial of Champions"
3	April 14, 2022	978-4-8156-0369-4	January 30, 2024	978-1-9753-7699-4
1. "Step VI: Dead Space"; 2. "Step VII: Lair of the Evil Samurai"; 3. "Step VIII: Dai Katana"; 4. "Step IX: Youth and Ashes, Side by Side"

== Manga ==
A manga adaptation by Kōsuke Kurose began serialization in the June 2016 issue of Square Enix's seinen manga magazine Monthly Big Gangan on May 25, 2016. Yen Press licensed the series at the same time as the light novels, and are simulpublishing the chapters in English as they are released in Japan.

Artist Kento Eida launched a prequel manga, titled Goblin Slayer Side Story: Year One, in Square Enix's seinen magazine Young Gangan on September 15, 2017. As with the main manga, the prequel is simulpublished by Yen Press.

A second adaptation of the main story, this one titled Goblin Slayer: Brand New Day and illustrated by Masahiro Ikeno, was serialized in Square Enix's Monthly Big Gangan from May 25, 2018, to May 27, 2019, and was compiled into two volumes. The story adapts the fourth volume of the light novel. Yen Press also simulpublished Brand New Day. The story follows the lives of the many other characters the main series' protagonists have encountered throughout their adventures, providing background on minor characters which further explores the world that Goblin Slayer takes place in.

Takashi Minakuchi launched a manga adaptation of the Goblin Slayer Side Story II: Dai Katana novel on Square Enix's Manga Up! app and on the Gangan GA website. Three chapters were published from December 28, 2018, to April 12, 2019. The manga was canceled and rebooted under a new artist, Aoki Shogo, with the first chapter published on August 30, 2019.

A manga by Daichi Matsuse titled Goblin Slayer: A Day in the Life, adapting the twelfth volume of the light novel, was serialized in Monthly Big Gangan from December 23, 2022, to November 25, 2024, and was compiled into three volumes.

=== Goblin Slayer ===
No.	Original release date	Original ISBN	English release date	English ISBN
1	September 13, 2016	978-4-7575-5116-9	December 19, 2017	978-0-316-43972-5
"Chapter 1"; "Chapter 2"; "Chapter 3"; "Chapter 4" + Omake
2	February 25, 2017	978-4-7575-5258-6	March 20, 2018	978-0-316-44823-9
"Chapter 5"; "Chapter 6"; "Chapter 7"; "Chapter 8"; "Chapter 9" + Omake
3	September 13, 2017	978-4-7575-5471-9	January 19, 2018	978-1-9753-2747-7
"Chapter 10"; "Chapter 11"; "Chapter 12"; "Chapter 13"; "Chapter 14"; "Chapter 15" + Omake
4	March 13, 2018	978-4-7575-5603-4	November 13, 2018	978-1-9753-2806-1
"Chapter 16"; "Chapter 17"; "Chapter 18"; "Chapter 19"; "Chapter 20"; "Chapter 21"
5	September 25, 2018	978-4-7575-5860-1	April 30, 2019	978-1-9753-3032-3
"Chapter 22"; "Chapter 23"; "Chapter 24"; "Chapter 25"; "Chapter 26"
6	December 13, 2018	978-4-7575-5944-8	September 24, 2019	978-1-9753-3193-1
"Chapter 27"; "Chapter 28"; "Chapter 29"; "Chapter 30"
7	June 25, 2019	978-4-7575-6175-5	March 31, 2020	978-1-9753-9943-6
"Chapter 31"; "Chapter 32"; "Chapter 33"; "Chapter 34"; "Chapter 35"
8	November 25, 2019	978-4-7575-6388-9	June 23, 2020	978-1-9753-1394-4
"Chapter 36"; "Chapter 37"; "Chapter 38"; "Chapter 39"; "Chapter 40"
9	February 12, 2020	978-4-7575-6521-0	December 15, 2020	978-1-9753-1791-1
"Chapter 41"; "Chapter 42"; "Chapter 43"; "Chapter 44"
10	October 12, 2020	978-4-7575-6904-1	August 24, 2021	978-1-9753-2483-4
"Chapter 45"; "Chapter 46"; "Chapter 47"; "Chapter 48"; "Chapter 49"; "Chapter 50"; "Chapter 51"
11	April 24, 2021	978-4-7575-7219-5	April 26, 2022	978-1-9753-3996-8
"Chapter 52"; "Chapter 53"; "Chapter 54"; "Chapter 55"; "Chapter 56"; "Chapter 57"
12	December 25, 2021	978-4-7575-7650-6	July 18, 2023	978-1-9753-4818-2
"Chapter 58"; "Chapter 59"; "Chapter 60"; "Chapter 61"; "Chapter 62"; "Chapter 63"; "Chapter 64"; "Chapter 64.5"
13	August 25, 2022	978-4-7575-8090-9	November 21, 2023	978-1-9753-7161-6
"Chapter 65"; "Chapter 66"; "Chapter 67"; "Chapter 68"; "Chapter 69"; "Chapter 70"; "Chapter 71"; "Chapter 72"
14	May 25, 2023	978-4-7575-8582-9	April 16, 2024	978-1-9753-9032-7
"Chapter 73"; "Chapter 74"; "Chapter 75"; "Chapter 76"; "Chapter 77"; "Chapter 78"; "Chapter 79"
15	March 25, 2024	978-4-7575-9117-2	December 17, 2024	979-8-8554-1001-3
"Chapter 80"; "Chapter 81"; "Chapter 82"; "Chapter 83"; "Chapter 84"; "Chapter 85"; "Chapter 86"; "Chapter 87"
16	February 25, 2025	978-4-7575-9693-1	October 28, 2025	979-8-8554-2455-3
"Chapter 88"; "Chapter 89"; "Chapter 90"; "Chapter 91"; "Chapter 92"; "Chapter 93"; "Chapter 94"; "Chapter 95"
17	December 25, 2025	978-4-301-00239-0	February 23, 2027	979-8-8554-4844-3
"Chapter 96"; "Chapter 97"; "Chapter 98"; "Chapter 99"; "Chapter 100"; "Chapter 101"; "Chapter 102"; "Chapter 103"; "Chapter 104"
18	November 25, 2026	978-4-301-00901-6	—	—

==== Chapters not yet in tankōbon format ====
These chapters have yet to be published in a tankōbon volume:

- "Chapter 105"
- "Chapter 106"
- "Chapter 107"
- "Chapter 108"
- "Chapter 109"
- "Chapter 110"
- "Chapter 111"
- "Chapter 112"
- "Chapter 113"

=== Goblin Slayer Side Story: Year One ===
No.	Original release date	Original ISBN	English release date	English ISBN
1	March 13, 2018	978-4-7575-5653-9	December 11, 2018	978-1-9753-2928-0
"Chapter 1"; "Chapter 2"; "Chapter 3"; "Chapter 4"; "Chapter 5"; "Chapter 6"
2	September 25, 2018	978-4-7575-5861-8	June 18, 2019	978-1-9753-0417-1
"Chapter 7"; "Chapter 8"; "Chapter 9"; "Chapter 10"; "Chapter 11"; "Chapter 12"
3	December 13, 2018	978-4-7575-5945-5	December 24, 2019	978-1-9753-8748-8
"Chapter 13"; "Chapter 14"; "Chapter 15"; "Chapter 16"; "Chapter 17"; "Chapter 17.5"; "Chapter 18"
4	June 25, 2019	978-4-7575-6176-2	April 28, 2020	978-1-9753-0886-5
"Chapter 19"; "Chapter 20"; "Chapter 20.5"; "Chapter 21"; "Chapter 22"; "Chapter 23"; "Chapter 24"; "Chapter 25"
5	November 25, 2019	978-4-7575-6389-6	July 28, 2020	978-1-9753-1524-5
"Chapter 25.5"; "Chapter 26"; "Chapter 27"; "Chapter 28"; "Chapter 29"; "Chapter 30"; "Chapter 31"; "Chapter 32"
6	October 12, 2020	978-4-7575-6905-8	March 15, 2022	978-1-9753-2487-2
"Chapter 33"; "Chapter 34"; "Chapter 35"; "Chapter 36"; "Chapter 37"; "Chapter 38"; "Chapter 39"; "Chapter 40"; "Chapter 41"; "Chapter 42"
7	April 24, 2021	978-4-7575-7220-1	June 7, 2022	978-1-9753-4066-7
"Chapter 43"; "Chapter 43.5"; "Chapter 44"; "Chapter 45"; "Chapter 46"; "Chapter 47"; "Chapter 48"; "Chapter 49"; "Chapter 50"; "Chapter 51"; "Chapter 52"
8	December 25, 2021	978-4-7575-7651-3	November 22, 2022	978-1-9753-5004-8
"Chapter 53"; "Chapter 54"; "Chapter 55"; "Chapter 56"; "Chapter 57"; "Chapter 58"; "Chapter 59"; "Chapter 60"
9	August 25, 2022	978-4-7575-8091-6	September 19, 2023	978-1-9753-7163-0
"Chapter 61"; "Chapter 62"; "Chapter 63"; "Chapter 64"; "Chapter 65"; "Chapter 66"; "Chapter 67"; "Chapter 68"; "Chapter 69"; "Chapter 70"
10	May 25, 2023	978-4-7575-8583-6	January 30, 2024	978-1-9753-9030-3
"Chapter 71"; "Chapter 72"; "Chapter 73"; "Chapter 74"; "Chapter 75"; "Chapter 76"; "Chapter 77"; "Chapter 78"; "Chapter 79"; "Chapter 80"; "Chapter 81"
11	October 25, 2023	978-4-7575-8868-4	September 17, 2024	979-8-8554-0215-5
"Chapter 82"; "Chapter 83"; "Chapter 84"; "Chapter 85"; "Chapter 86"; "Chapter 87"; "Chapter 88"; "Chapter 89"; "Chapter 90"; "Chapter 91"; "Chapter 92"
12	March 25, 2024	978-4-7575-9118-9	April 8, 2025	979-8-8554-1007-5
"Chapter 93"; "Chapter 94"; "Chapter 95"; "Chapter 96"; "Chapter 97"; "Chapter 98"; "Chapter 99"; "Chapter 100"
13	February 25, 2025	978-4-7575-9694-8	January 20, 2026	979-8-8554-2457-7
"Chapter 101"; "Chapter 102"; "Chapter 103"; "Chapter 104"; "Chapter 105"; "Chapter 106"; "Chapter 107"; "Chapter 108"
14	December 25, 2025	978-4-301-00240-6	March 23, 2027	979-8-8554-4846-7
"Chapter 109"; "Chapter 110"; "Chapter 111"; "Chapter 112"; "Chapter 113"; "Chapter 114"; "Chapter 115"; "Chapter 116"; "Chapter 117"; "Chapter 118"
15	November 25, 2026	978-4-301-00902-3	—	—

==== Chapters not yet in tankōbon format ====
The following chapters were serialized in Young Gangan and published digitally by Yen Press, but have not yet been collected into a volume:

- "Chapter 119"
- "Chapter 120"
- "Chapter 121"
- "Chapter 122"
- "Chapter 123"
- "Chapter 124"
- "Chapter 125"
- "Chapter 126"
- "Chapter 127"
- "Chapter 128"
- "Chapter 129"
- "Chapter 130"
- "Chapter 131"
- "Chapter 132"
- "Chapter 133"
- "Chapter 134"
- "Chapter 135"

=== Goblin Slayer: Brand New Day ===
No.	Original release date	Original ISBN	English release date	English ISBN
1	September 25, 2018	978-4-7575-5862-5	July 16, 2019	978-1-9753-5762-7
"Chapter 1"; "Chapter 2"; "Chapter 3"; "Chapter 4"
2	June 25, 2019	978-4-7575-6177-9	February 25, 2020	978-1-9753-9921-4
"Chapter 5"; "Chapter 6"; "Chapter 6.5"; "Chapter 7"; "Chapter 8"; "Chapter 9"; "Chapter 9.5"; "Chapter 10"

=== Goblin Slayer Side Story II: Dai Katana ===
No.	Original release date	Original ISBN	English release date	English ISBN
1	February 12, 2020	978-4-7575-6522-7	March 30, 2021	978-1-9753-2279-3
"Chapter 1"; "Chapter 2"; "Chapter 3"; "Chapter 4"; "Chapter 5"
2	October 12, 2020	978-4-7575-6733-7	November 30, 2021	978-1-9753-3633-2
"Chapter 6"; "Chapter 7"; "Chapter 8"; "Chapter 9"; "Chapter 10"
3	April 24, 2021	978-4-7575-7221-8	June 28, 2022	978-1-9753-4557-0
"Chapter 11"; "Chapter 12"; "Chapter 13"; "Chapter 14"; "Chapter 15"
4	December 25, 2021	978-4-7575-7652-0	March 21, 2023	978-1-9753-5002-4
"Chapter 16"; "Chapter 17"; "Chapter 18"; "Chapter 19"
5	August 25, 2022	978-4-7575-8092-3	October 17, 2023	978-1-9753-6857-9
"Chapter 20"; "Chapter 21"; "Chapter 22"; "Chapter 23"; "Chapter 23.5"
6	May 25, 2023	978-4-7575-8584-3	February 20, 2024	978-1-9753-8865-2
"Chapter 24"; "Chapter 25"; "Chapter 26"; "Chapter 27"; "Chapter 28"; "Chapter 28.5"
7	March 25, 2024	978-4-7575-9119-6	January 21, 2025	979-8-8554-1005-1
"Chapter 29"; "Chapter 30"; "Chapter 31"; "Chapter 32"
8	February 25, 2025	978-4-7575-9695-5	—	—
"Chapter 33"; "Chapter 34"; "Chapter 35"; "Chapter 36"; "Chapter 37"
9	December 25, 2025	978-4-301-00241-3	—	—
"Chapter 38"; "Chapter 39"; "Chapter 40"; "Chapter 41"; "Chapter 42"

=== Goblin Slayer: A Day in the Life ===
No.	Original release date	Original ISBN	English release date	English ISBN
1	May 25, 2023	978-4-7575-8585-0	May 21, 2024	978-1-9753-9702-9
"Chapter 1"; "Chapter 2"; "Chapter 3"; "Chapter 4"; "Chapter 4.5"
2	March 25, 2024	978-4-7575-9120-2	February 25, 2025	979-8-8554-1003-7
"Chapter 5"; "Chapter 6"; "Chapter 7"; "Chapter 8"; "Chapter 9"; "Chapter 10"; "Chapter 10.5"
3	February 25, 2025	978-4-7575-9696-2	December 16, 2025	979-8-8554-2459-1
"Chapter 11"; "Chapter 12"; "Chapter 13"; "Chapter 14"; "Chapter 15"; "Chapter 16"; "Chapter 17"; "Final Chapter"; "Interlude: Of One Job Done"

== See also ==
- List of Goblin Slayer episodes
