= Mariya Ise =

Japanese voice actress (born 1988)

- 伊瀬 茉莉也
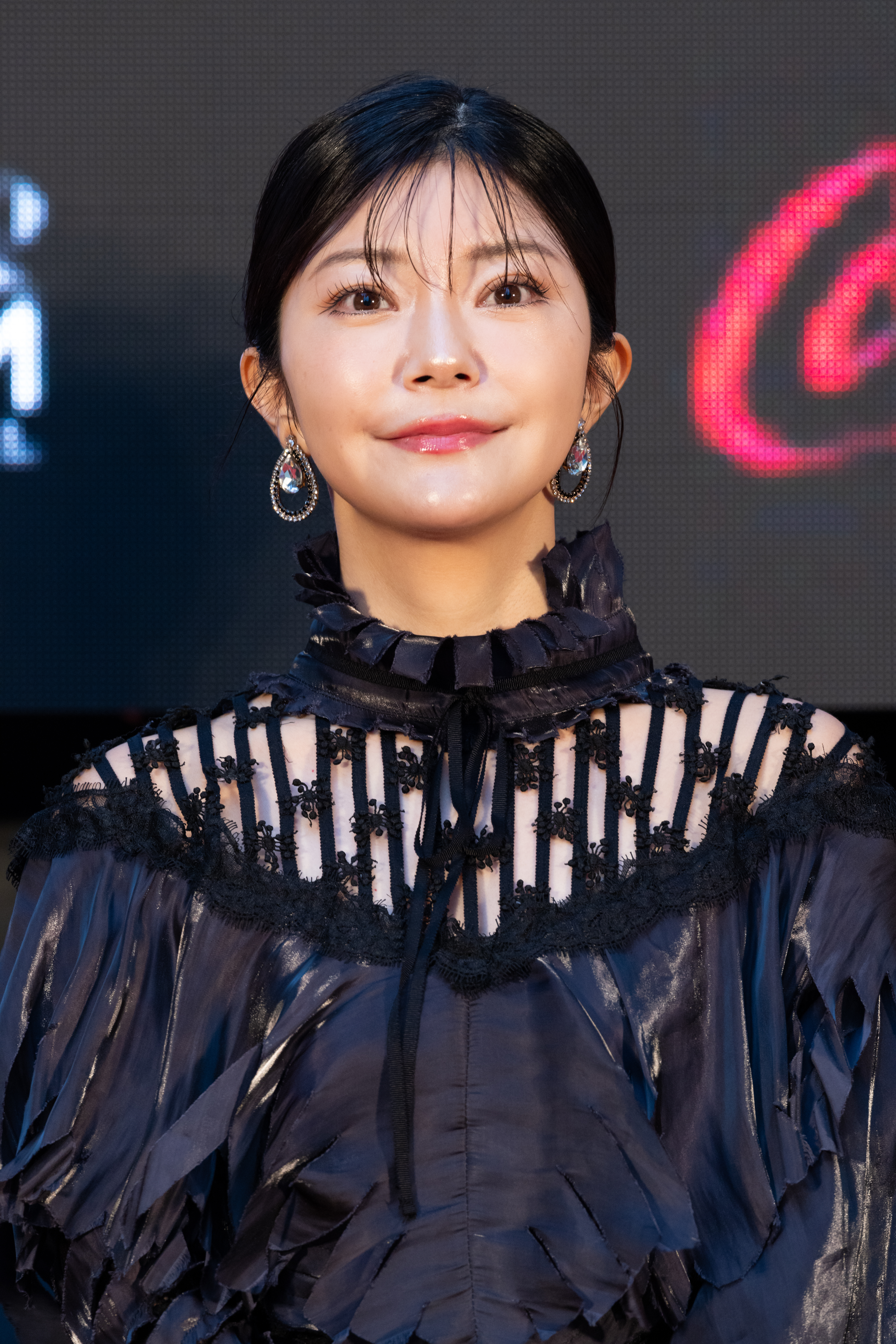
- Ise attending the 37th Tokyo International Film Festival in October 2024
- Born: September 25, 1988 (age 38); Yokohama, Kanagawa Prefecture, Japan
- Occupations: Actress; voice actress
- Years active: 2002–present
- Agent: Across Entertainment
- Notable work: Hunter × Hunter (2011) as Killua Zoldyck; Yes! PreCure 5 as Urara Kasugano/Cure Lemonade; The Promised Neverland as Ray; Fairy Tail as Levy McGarden; Panty & Stocking with Garterbelt as Stocking; Tiger & Bunny as Huang Pao-Lin / Dragon Kid; Pokémon the Series: XY as Eureka/Bonnie; Made in Abyss as Reg; Kakegurui – Compulsive Gambler as Midari Ikishima; Path to Nowhere as Wendy; Wuthering Waves as Camellya; Frieren as Serie
- Spouse: Unknown (m. 2015; div. 2022)
- Children: 1

Mariya Ise (伊瀬 茉莉也, Ise Mariya; born September 25, 1988) is a Japanese actress who specializes in voice acting.

She played Riko Mine in Hidan no Aria, Urara Kasugano/Cure Lemonade in Yes! PreCure 5 and its sequels GoGo! and Power of Hope: PreCure Full Bloom, Killua Zoldyck in Hunter × Hunter (2011), Ray in The Promised Neverland, Midari Ikishima in Kakegurui – Compulsive Gambler, Reg in Made in Abyss, Eureka (Bonnie in the English dub) in Pokémon the Series: XY, Stocking in Panty & Stocking with Garterbelt, and Levy McGarden in Fairy Tail.

== Biography ==
She was interested in pursuing acting after seeing Princess Mononoke in third grade. Initially, she longed for director work and began to see various works.

In 2002, she starred in the anime series Aishiteruze Baby. Immediately after her debut, she voiced Cure Lemonade in Yes! PreCure 5 and the guest star of television special Lupin III: Seven Days Rhapsody. Ise is known for being a prolific voice actor who's played a wide variety of roles.

On October 1, 2009, she moved her office from Bring-up to Across Entertainment. She married in January 2015. In the fall of that year, she reported on her blog that she gave birth to her first child. She divorced in August 2022 and took full custody of her child, a son.

== Filmography ==
=== Television animation ===
Year	Title	Role	Other notes
2005	Mushishi	Renzu Ioroi	Episode 1
2005	Onegai My Melody	Yuka Kano	
2005	Sugar Sugar Rune	Nanako Walsh	
2006	Air Gear	Ringo Noyamano	
2006	Lupin III: Seven Days Rhapsody	Michelle	
2006	Onegai My Melody ~Kuru Kuru Shuffle~	Yuka Kano	
2006	Pretty Cure Splash Star	Mari Yamaguchi	
2006	School Rumble Second Term	Satsuki Tawaraya	
2007	Eyeshield 21	Riko	
2007	Onegai My Melody Sukkiri♪	Yuka Kano	
2007	Tōka Gettan	Tōka Kamiazuma	
2007	Yes! Pretty Cure 5	Urara Kasugano/Cure Lemonade	
2008	Gunslinger Girl -il Teatrino-	Beatrice	
2008	Hell Girl: Three Vessels	Sora Kōjō	
2008	Magician's Academy	Tanarotte	
2008	Penguin Musume Heart	Kujira Eturofu	
2008	Porphy no Nagai Tabi	Alicia	
2008	Yes! Pretty Cure 5 GoGo!	Urara Kasugano/Cure Lemonade	
2009	Chrome Shelled Regios	Barmelin Swattis Nolne	
2009	Fairy Tail	Levy McGarden, Romeo Conbolt	
2009	GA Geijutsuka Art Design Class	Yoshikawa	
2009	Hatsukoi Limited	Ayumi Arihara	
2009	Jewelpet	Ririka Himeno	
2009	Needless	Aruka	
2009	Sora no Manimani	Sakurakawa	
2009	Yumeiro Patissiere	Lemon Yamagishi	
2009	Tamagotchi!	Kizunatchi	
2010	Durarara!!	Mika Harima	
2010	Hanamaru Kindergarten	Hinagiku	
2010	Ladies versus Butlers!	Kaede Tenjōji	
2010	Kaichō wa Maid-sama!	Erika	
2010	Model Suit Gunpla Builders Beginning G	Rina Noyama	
2010	Ōkami Kakushi	Nemuru Kushinada	
2010	Ore no Imōto ga Konna ni Kawaii Wake ga Nai	Sena Akagi	
2010	Panty & Stocking with Garterbelt	Stocking	
2010	The Legend of the Legendary Heroes	Kuu Orla	
2010	Toaru Majutsu no Index II	Lucia	
2010	Yumeiro Patissiere	Lemon Yamagishi	
2011	Aria the Scarlet Ammo	Riko Mine	
2011	Ben-To	Sen Yarizui	
2011	Dream Eater Merry	Saki Kirishima	
2011	Hunter × Hunter	Killua Zoldyck	
2011	Boku wa Tomodachi ga Sukunai	Yusa Aoi	
2011	Kimi ni Todoke 2nd Season	Musubi Tomizawa	Episode 10
2011	Tiger & Bunny	Pao-Lin Huang	
2011	Maken-ki!	Syria Ōtsuka	
2011	Mayo Chiki!	Masamune Usami	
2011	Ro-Kyu-Bu!	Miyu Aida	
2011	Sengoku Otome ~Momoiro Paradox~	Uesugi Kenshin	
2011	Chibi Devi!	Ghost of the Toilet	
2012	Bodacious Space Pirates	Natalia Grennorth	
2012	Code Geass: Akito the Exiled	Olivia Lowell	
2012	Ebiten: Kōritsu Ebisugawa Kōkō Tenmonbu	Itsuki Noya	
2012	Girls und Panzer	Naomi	
2012	Hyōka	Misaki Sawakiguchi	
2012	Inazuma Eleven GO Chrono Stone	Beta	
2012	Medaka Box Abnormal	Unzen Myouga	
2012	Zetman	Hanako Tanaka	
2013	Battle Spirits: Saikyou Ginga Ultimate Zero	Lila April	
2013	Code Geass: Akito the Exiled	Jean Rowe	
2013	Boku wa Tomodachi ga Sukunai NEXT	Yusa Aoi	
2013	Fate/kaleid liner Prisma Illya	Nanaki Moriyama	
2013	Aku no Hana	Sawa Nakamura	
2013	Log Horizon	Lenessia Erhart Cowen	
2013	Oreimo.	Sena Akagi	
2013	Photo Kano	Kanon Maeda	
2013	Pocket Monsters: XY	Eureka/Bonnie	
2013	Ro-Kyu-Bu! SS	Miyu Aida	
2014	Atelier Escha & Logy: Alchemists of the Dusk Sky	Nio Altugle	
2014	Attack on Titan: No Regrets	Isabel Magnolia	
2014	Cross Ange	Misty Rosenblum	
2014	Dragonar Academy	Eco	Episodes 2-12
2014	Fairy Tail	Levy McGarden, Romeo Conbolt	
2014	Log Horizon Season 2	Lenessia Erhart Cowen	
2014	Lord Marksman and Vanadis	Ludmila Lourie	
2014	Maken-ki! Two	Syria Ōtsuka	
2014	Nanatsu no Taizai	Guila	
2014	Wolf Girl and Black Prince	Marin Tachibana	
2014	The World Is Still Beautiful	Mira Remercier	
2015	Aria the Scarlet Ammo AA	Riko Mine	
2015	Durarara!!x2 Shō	Mika Harima	
2015	Durarara!!x2 Ten	Mika Harima	
2015	Gunslinger Stratos: The Animation	Matsurika Shinō	
2015	Pocket Monsters: XY&Z	Eureka/Bonnie	
2015	Yurikuma Arashi	Eriko Oniyama	
2016	DAYS	Chikako Ubukata	
2016	Durarara!!x2 Ketsu	Mika Harima	
2016	Kabaneri of the Iron Fortress	Yukina	
2016	Seisen Cerberus	Sharisharu	
2016	Danganronpa 3: The End of Hope's Peak High School	Nagisa Shingetsu	
2016	Yuri on Ice	Yuuko Nishigori	
2017	Boruto: Naruto Next Generations	Buntan Kurosuki	
2017	Made in Abyss	Reg	
2017	Kakegurui	Midari Ikishima	
2017	Altair: A Record of Battles	Lily Kokoschka	
2017	Gintama: Porori-hen	Bichiey (ビチエ)	
2017	Land of the Lustrous	Antarcticite	
2018	The Seven Deadly Sins: Revival of the Commandments	Guila	
2018	Angels of Death	Cathy	
2018	Kira Kira Happy ★ Hirake! Cocotama	Pillow	
2018	Hanebado!	Connie Christensen	
2019	Kakegurui ××	Midari Ikishima	
2019	The Promised Neverland	Ray	
2019	Mix	Arisa Mita	
2019	One Piece	Kiku	
2019	Black Clover	Dorothy Unsworth	
2020	The God of High School	Jegal Taek (kid)	
2020; 2023; 2026	Jujutsu Kaisen	Setsuko Sasaki, Satoru Gojo (young)	
2021	The Promised Neverland Season 2	Ray	
2021	Log Horizon: Destruction of the Round Table	Lenessia Erhart Cowen	
2021	SSSS.Dynazenon	Ms. Inamoto	
2021	The Dungeon of Black Company	Fau	
2021	The Idaten Deities Know Only Peace	Miku	
2021	Megaton Musashi	Sayaka Minami	
2022	Akebi's Sailor Uniform	Ai Tatsumori	
2022	Pokémon Ultimate Journeys: The Series	Bonnie	
2022	Mahjong Soul Pong	Kaguya-hime	
2022	Shin Ikki Tousen	Tamonmaru Kusunoki	
2022	Made in Abyss: The Golden City of the Scorching Sun	Reg	
2022	Chainsaw Man	Himeno	
2023	Sorcerous Stabber Orphen: Chaos in Urbanrama	Shiina	
2023	Kubo Won't Let Me Be Invisible	Seita Shiraishi	
2023	The Vampire Dies in No Time 2nd Season	Sanzu	
2023	Undead Unluck	Juiz	
2023	Dog Signal	Yūko	
2023	Goblin Slayer II	Wizard Boy	
2023	Beyblade X	Shiguru Nanairo	
2023	Power of Hope: PreCure Full Bloom	Urara Kasugano/Cure Lemonade	
2023	Dead Mount Death Play	Urdwigia	Ep. 20
2024-present	Frieren	Serie	
2024	7th Time Loop: The Villainess Enjoys a Carefree Life Married to Her Worst Enemy!	Theodor August Hein	
2024	Metallic Rouge	Opera	
2024	The Banished Former Hero Lives as He Pleases	Akira	
2024	Mission: Yozakura Family	Ayaka Kirisaki	
2024	The Magical Girl and the Evil Lieutenant Used to Be Archenemies	Hibana Kagari	
2024	Uzumaki	Azami Kurotani	
2025	Ishura 2nd Season	Kūro the Cautious	
2025	Umamusume: Cinderella Gray	Fujimasa March	
2025	Mobile Suit Gundam GQuuuuuuX	Annqi	
2025	Miru: Paths to My Future	SDK/Kanon	
2025	Welcome to the Outcast's Restaurant!	Vivia	
2025	Reincarnated as a Neglected Noble: Raising My Baby Brother with Memories from My Past Life	Regulus	
2025	New Panty & Stocking with Garterbelt	Stocking	
2025	Tougen Anki	Yomogi Momokusa	
2025	Dusk Beyond the End of the World	Seshat	
2025	Sanda	Fumi Namatame	
2026	The Case Book of Arne	Luis Hartman	
2026	Easygoing Territory Defense by the Optimistic Lord	Khamsin	
2026	Marriagetoxin	Shizuku Ushio	
2026	Witch Hat Atelier	Riliphin	
2026	Chainsmoker Cat	Lani	Ep. 5
2026	Romelia War Chronicle	Ekaterina	
2026	Magical Girl Raising Project: Restart	Clantail	
2026	As a Reincarnated Aristocrat, I'll Use My Appraisal Skill to Rise in the World III	Micah Fujimiya	
2027	The Guy She Was Interested in Wasn't a Guy at All	Mitsuki Koga	
2027	Kindergarten Wars	Silvia	

=== OVAs/ONAs ===
Year	Title	Role	Other notes	Type
2008	Detroit Metal City	Crowther		OVA
2011	Mobile Suit Gundam Unicorn	Loni Garvey		OVA
2016	The Kubikiri Cycle	Iria Akagami		OVA
2021	Star Wars: Visions - The Village Bride	Saku		ONA
2021	Super Crooks	Janice	Episode 1	ONA
2021–22	JoJo's Bizarre Adventure: Stone Ocean	Foo Fighters, Atroe		ONA
2022	Tiger & Bunny 2	Pao-Lin Huang/Dragon Kid		ONA
2022	Spriggan	Yoshino Somei		ONA
2022	Tekken: Bloodline	Akiko Miura		ONA
2024	The Grimm Variations	Scarlet		ONA; Episode 2
2024	Tokyo Override	Watari		ONA

=== Anime films ===
Year	Title	Role
2007	Yes! PreCure 5 the Movie: Great Miraculous Adventure in the Mirror Kingdom!	Urara Kasugano/Cure Lemonade
2008	Yes! PreCure 5 GoGo! the Movie: Happy Birthday in the Sweets Kingdom	Urara Kasugano/Cure Lemonade
2009	Pretty Cure All Stars DX: Everyone's Friends - the Collection of Miracles!	Urara Kasugano/Cure Lemonade
2010	Pretty Cure All Stars DX2: Light of Hope - Protect the Rainbow Jewel!	Urara Kasugano/Cure Lemonade
2011	Pretty Cure All Stars DX3: Deliver the Future! The Rainbow-Colored Flower That Connects the World	Urara Kasugano/Cure Lemonade
2012	Evangelion: 3.0 You Can (Not) Redo	Midori Kitakami
2014	Pretty Cure All Stars New Stage 3: Eternal Friends	Urara Kasugano/Cure Lemonade
2014	Pokémon the Movie XY: The Cocoon of Destruction and Diancie	Eureka/Bonnie
2015	Pokémon the Movie XY - The Archdjinni of the Rings: Hoopa	Eureka/Bonnie
2016	Pokémon the Movie XY&Z: Volcanion and the Exquisite Magearna	Eureka/Bonnie
2017	Fairy Tail: Dragon Cry	Levy McGarden
2018	Hug! Pretty Cure Futari wa Pretty Cure: All Stars Memories	Urara Kasugano/Cure Lemonade
2020	Made in Abyss: Dawn of the Deep Soul	Reg
2020	Date A Live Fragment: Date A Bullet	Tsuan
2020	Demon Slayer: Kimetsu no Yaiba – The Movie: Mugen Train	Kyojuro Rengoku (Young)
2021	My Hero Academia: World Heroes' Mission	Beros
2021	Healin' Good Pretty Cure the Movie: GoGo! Big Transformation! The Town of Dreams	Urara Kasugano/Cure Lemonade
2021	Evangelion: 3.0+1.0 Thrice Upon a Time	Midori Kitakami
2022	The Orbital Children	Nasa Houston
2023	Pretty Guardian Sailor Moon Cosmos The Movie	Sailor Tin Nyanko
2024	A Few Moments of Cheers	Yuu Orie
2024	Mobile Suit Gundam: Silver Phantom	Babia Lena
2026	Made in Abyss: Mezameru Shinpi	Reg
2026	The Apothecary Diaries: The Late Lady's Treasure	Mu Qing

=== Tokusatsu ===
Year	Title	Role	Other notes
2025	No.1 Sentai Gozyuger	Ribbon	Episodes 37–40

=== Drama CDs ===
- Attack on Titan (xxx) – Isabel Magnolia
- Uwasa no Midori-kun!! (xxxx) – Midori Yamate
- Tonari no Kaibutsu-kun (xxxx) – Mizutani Shizuku
- Atelier Ayesha: The Alchemist of Dusk (xxxx) – Nio Altugle (anime adaptation)
- Vampire Knight Memories (2019) – Ai Kuran
- The Guy She Was Interested in Wasn't a Guy at All (2024) – Mitsuki Koga

=== Video games ===
- Shin Megami Tensei: Devil Survivor Overclocked (2011) – Midori Komaki
- Final Fantasy XIII-2 (2011) – Paddra Nsu-Yeul
- Phantasy Star Online 2 (2012) – Ulc, Euclita
- Tales of Xillia 2 (2012) – Elle Mel Marta
- Dragon's Dogma: Dark Arisen (2013) – Aelinore
- Conception II: Children of the Seven Stars (2013) – Ellie Troit
- The Witch and the Hundred Knight (2013) – Metallia
- Atelier Ayesha: The Alchemist of Dusk (2013) – Nio Altugle
- Final Fantasy XIV: A Realm Reborn (2013) – Nanamo Ul Namo, Tataru
- The Legend of Heroes: Trails of Cold Steel (2013) – Laura S. Arseid
- Lightning Returns: Final Fantasy XIII (2013) – Paddra Nsu-Yeul
- Granblue Fantasy (2014) – Farrah, Helel ben Shalem
- Schoolgirl Strikers (2014) – Amane Kyobashi
- J-Stars Victory VS (2014) – Killua Zoldyck
- Atelier Escha & Logy: Alchemists of the Dusk Sky (2014) – Nio Altugle
- Danganronpa Another Episode: Ultra Despair Girls (2014) – Nagisa Shingetsu
- The Legend of Heroes: Trails of Cold Steel II (2014) – Laura S. Arseid
- Xenoblade Chronicles X (2015) – Lin
- The Legend of Heroes: Trails of Cold Steel III (2018) – Laura S. Arseid
- Azur Lane (2018) – USS Radford (DD-446), USS Jenkins (DD-447)
- Fate/Grand Order (2018) – Hinako Akuta - Consort Yu ("Yu Meiren" in English version; "Gu Bijin" in Japanese version)
- Food Fantasy (2018) – Yogurt, Macaron, Nasi Lemak
- The Legend of Heroes: Trails of Cold Steel IV (2018) – Laura S. Arseid
- Tokyo Afterschool Summoners (2018) – Arc, Durga
- Another Eden (2019) – Nagi
- The Seven Deadly Sins: Grand Cross (2019) – Guila
- Arknights (2019) – Magallan
- Final Fantasy XIV: Shadowbringers (2019) – Beq Lugg
- Grimms Notes (2020) – Lafcadio
- Girls' Frontline (2020) – QBU-88, ACR
- Live-A-Hero (2020) – Sui
- Magia Record (2020) – Rui Mizuki
- Guardian Tales (2020) – Ice Witch Lupina
- Shin Megami Tensei Nocturne HD Remaster (2020) – Lucifer (Blonde Child form)
- Lord of Heroes (2020) – Astrid Remond
- Dragon Quest Rivals Ace (2021) – Tipper Taloon
- The Caligula Effect 2 (2021) – Kudan
- Sin Chronicle (2021) – Biscuit
- Cookie Run: Kingdom (2021) – Tiger Lily Cookie, Sherbet Cookie
- Made in Abyss: Binary Star Falling into Darkness (2022) – Reg
- Counter:Side (2022) – Evolve One
- Path to Nowhere (2022) – Wendy
- JoJo's Bizarre Adventure: All Star Battle R (2022) – Foo Fighters
- Goddess of Victory: Nikke (2023) – Himeno
- Touhou Gensou Eclipse (2023) – Marisa Kirisame
- 404 Game Re:set (2023) – Crazy Taxi
- Wuthering Waves (2024) – Camellya
- Sword Art Online: Fractured Daydream (2024), Neige
- Fire Emblem: Fortune's Weave (2026) – Leda

Unknown date

- Age of Ishtaria – Salix
- Kantai Collection – I-401
- Super Heroine Chronicle (2014) – Riko Mine Lupin the 4th
- Tales of Xillia 2 – Elle Mel Marta
- Zettai Meikyuu Grimm – Henrietta Grimm
- Zettai Zetsubō Shōjo: Danganronpa AnotherEpisode – Nagisa Shingetsu

=== Dubbing ===
==== Live-action ====
- A Discovery of Witches – Satu Järvinen (Malin Buska)
- And Just Like That... – Rose Goldenblatt (Alexa Swinton)
- Beetlejuice Beetlejuice – Astrid Deetz (Jenna Ortega)
- Emma's Chance – Emma (Greer Grammer)
- The Exorcist – Casey Rance (Hannah Kasulka)
- Mad Max: Fury Road (2019 THE CINEMA edition) – Capable (Riley Keough)
- Madame Web – Mattie Franklin (Celeste O'Connor)
- Moonfall – Michelle (Kelly Yu)
- The Queen's Gambit – Beth Harmon (Anya Taylor-Joy)
- Smash – Margot (Nikki Blonsky)
- Station Eleven – Young Kirsten (Matilda Lawler)
- The Three Musketeers – Princess Anne (Juno Temple)
- Thunderbolts* – Mel (Geraldine Viswanathan)
- The Winchesters – Mary Campbell (Meg Donnelly)
- The Witches – Daisy (Kristin Chenoweth)

==== Animation ====
- Winx Club (animated TV series (Japanese)) (2005–2007) – Musa (debuted in Japan in 2007)
- Higglytown Heroes (Playhouse Disney) (animated TV series (Japanese)) - Fran (Season 2, debuted in Japan in 2005)
- Chuggington (CBeebies/Disney Junior) (animated TV series (Japanese)) – Emery (debuted in Japan in 2011)
- The Addams Family – Parker Needler
- Adventure Time: Distant Lands – Cadebra

=== Substitutes ===
- Chinami Hashimoto – Minna Atsumare! Falcom Gakuen – Laura S. Arzaid
- Mika Kanai – Pokémon the Series: XY – Bonnie
- Ikumi Hayama – Fairy Tail – Levy McGarden
