= Goblin Slayer season 1 =

Goblin Slayer
- Season 1
- No. of episodes: 12

Release
- Original network: AT-X
- Original release: October 7 – December 30, 2018

Season chronology
- Next → Goblin Slayer II

Goblin Slayer is an anime television series based on the light novel series of the same title written by Kumo Kagyu and illustrated by Noboru Kannatuki. The 12-episode first season was produced by White Fox and aired from October 7 to December 30, 2018 (Note: The series premiered on October 6 at 24:30, which is the same as October 7 at 12:30 AM.) on AT-X, Tokyo MX, SUN, and BS11. The series is directed by Takaharu Ozaki, with scripts penned by Hideyuki Kurata and Yōsuke Kuroda, character designs handled by Takashi Nagayoshi and music composed by Kenichirō Suehiro. The opening theme song is "Rightfully" performed by Mili, while the ending theme song is "Gin no Kisei" (銀の祈誓; "Silver's Oath") performed by Soraru.

Funimation licensed and produced an English dub for the anime, with Crunchyroll simulcasting the series internationally outside of Asia.

== Episodes ==
No. overall	No. in season	Title (Note: English translated titles are taken from Crunchyroll.)	Directed by	Written by	Storyboarded by	Original release date
1	1	"The Fate of Particular Adventurers"; Transliteration: "Aru Bōkenshatachi no Ketsumatsu" (Japanese: ある冒険者たちの結末)	Takaharu Ozaki	Hideyuki Kurata	Takaharu Ozaki	October 7, 2018
A young Priestess joins a group of rookie adventurers who decide to raid a cave infested with goblins. Things quickly go awry when the inexperienced party is ambushed by goblins, resulting in all of them except for the Priestess being killed, raped, or captured. The Priestess is rescued by the sudden arrival of Goblin Slayer, who swiftly kills the goblins attacking her. She decides to follow Goblin Slayer as he proceeds deeper into the cave, killing more goblins and teaching her about their psychology and battle tactics. With the Priestess' help, Goblin Slayer is able to kill the remaining goblins, including a goblin shaman and hobgoblin. They then discover several goblin infants, which Goblin Slayer mercilessly kills to prevent them from becoming threats in the future. Despite the traumatic experience, the Priestess decides to join Goblin Slayer as his adventuring companion.
2	2	"Goblin Slayer"; Transliteration: "Goburin o Korosu Mono" (Japanese: 小鬼を殺す者)	Shūji Miyahara	Yōsuke Kuroda	Takaharu Ozaki	October 14, 2018
Goblin Slayer accompanies his childhood friend Cow Girl to sell her uncle's farm produce to the city. He later heads to the Adventurer's Guild to find work, where he is treated by the rest of the adventurers as an outcast due to his low-quality armor and his habit of only accepting goblin-related quests despite his status as a high-ranked adventurer. Nevertheless, Guild Girl (a member of staff at the Guild) is glad for his dedication towards goblin extermination since most adventurers don't take goblin quests due to their low bounties, and those that do are often inexperienced. Goblin Slayer reveals that when he was a young boy, his village was attacked by goblins who killed nearly all of the villagers, including Cow Girl's parents. There, he witnessed the gang rape and subsequent murder of his elder sister by goblins. This led him to train himself and learn how to kill goblins but also resulted in him becoming socially awkward and obsessed with killing goblins, which Cow Girl's uncle warns will be why Goblin Slayer will never be normal. Cow Girl continues to support her friend despite her uncle's warnings, as she wishes to apologize to him for not bringing him with her to the city on the day before the goblins attacked their village. Later, Goblin Slayer and Priestess attack a fortress occupied by goblins, burning it down and preventing the goblins from escaping. Elsewhere, a High Elf and her companions are looking for an adventurer named Orcbolg.
3	3	"Unexpected Visitors"; Transliteration: "Omoigakenai Raikyaku" (Japanese: 思いがけない来客)	Kazuomi Koga	Hideyuki Kurata	Kazuomi Koga	October 21, 2018
High Elf Archer, Dwarf Shaman, and Lizard Priest ask Guild Girl for an adventurer called Orcbolg and Beardcutter, actually referring to Goblin Slayer in their race's native tongues. While Goblin Slayer talks with the trio, Priestess gets defended by Witch, an acquaintance of Goblin Slayer, when some rookie adventurers try to convince Priestess to leave Goblin Slayer and join them, assuming he is only using Priestess as bait. High Elf Archer explains to Goblin Slayer that their races have united with the human kingdoms to fight against the resurrected Demon Lord's army and want to hire him for a related quest. Goblin Slayer refuses at first (much to High Elf Archer's anger) as Demons are not his concern until Dwarf Shaman and Lizard Priest mentions ruins in Elven lands occupied by goblins since the Elves cannot mobilize their army due to political concerns. Priestess also joins their quest after calling out Goblin Slayer for not asking if she wanted to join. As the group make camp and enjoys their races' food, a drunken High Elf Archer berates Goblin Slayer for his rude behavior while the others talk about where goblins came from. The next day, High Elf Archer kills the goblin sentries at the ruins, and the group enters.
4	4	"The Strong"; Transliteration: "Tsuyoki Monodomo" (Japanese: 強き者ども)	Masayuki Sakoi	Hideyuki Kurata	Masayuki Sakoi	October 28, 2018
Goblin Slayer's group enters the ruins where he notices there are no totems, suggesting a shaman does not lead these goblins. After rescuing an elven prisoner tortured by goblins, an angry High Elf Archer vows to avenge her fellow kin. The group finds a hall where the goblins are resting. Goblin Slayer's group uses sleeping and silence spells to kill the sleeping goblins without alerting the others. However, their silence alerts the goblin's leader, an Ogre, one of the Demon Lord's generals. The Ogre attacks the group using his strength and fire magic and proves difficult to kill due to his large size and ability to heal quickly. With his allies at their limit, Goblin Slayer uses his trump card, a magic teleportation scroll given to him by Witch, which sends strong jets of water from the bottom of the ocean to damage the Ogre before giving him the killing blow. As Elvish reinforcements arrive to take over the ruins and Goblin Slayer's group heads back to the city, her experience with Goblin Slayer and his obsession makes High Elf Archer want to take Goblin Slayer to a proper adventure.
5	5	"Adventures and Daily Life"; Transliteration: "Bōken to Nichijō to" (Japanese: 冒険と日常と)	Kazuomi Koga	Yōsuke Kuroda	Kazuomi Koga	November 4, 2018
After recovering from his wounds, Goblin Slayer helps Cow Girl cart supplies to town. There, he meets High Elf Archer, Dwarf Shaman, and Lizard Priest, and tells them he is open to the idea of exploring some ruins with them. Priestess informs him she has been promoted to the next adventurer rank and formally thanks Goblin Slayer for saving her life. He then encounters two young adventurers who lost a sword in the sewers, and advises them to use a club as an improvised weapon so they can retrieve it. Guild Girl asks him to act as an observer on a promotion exam, where she punishes a rhea scout for stealing loot from his party. The rhea scout considers attacking Guild Girl but is dissuaded by Goblin Slayer's presence. Meanwhile, the two young adventurers recover the sword thanks to Goblin Slayer's advice. Goblin Slayer then receives a special goblin slaying request from Sword Maiden herself.
6	6	"Goblin Slayer in the Water Town"; Transliteration: "Mizu no Machi no Koonigoroshi" (Japanese: 水の街の小鬼殺し)	Hiroaki Takagi	Yōsuke Kuroda	Hiroaki Takagi	November 11, 2018
Ten years ago, a group of Heroes (including Sword Maiden) slew the original Demon Lord. Currently, the new Hero and her companions slay the resurrected Demon Lord in another part of the world and crush his army, though some generals remain on the loose. Goblin Slayer and the rest of the party journey to Water Town, where they meet Sword Maiden, now retired. Sword Maiden informs them there have been a string of violent murders in the town recently, and they suspect the culprits are goblins in the town's sewer system. Since the army won't mobilize to fight goblins and other adventurers have failed, she decided to reach out to Goblin Slayer. Goblin Slayer agrees to the quest and leads the party into the sewers, where they discover the goblins have learned to use boats to navigate the sewers. This puzzles Goblin Slayer as goblins have never been smart enough to use boats before. After sinking a goblin boat, the party attracts the attention of a giant alligator, which they take advantage of by tricking it into destroying the rest of the goblin fleet. As they return to the surface, Goblin Slayer is troubled that the goblins knew how to use boats yet were unaware of the alligator, leading him to conclude that somebody had placed the goblins in the sewers.
7	7	"Onward Unto Death"; Transliteration: "Shi e Susume" (Japanese: 死へ進め)	Takaharu Ozaki	Yōsuke Kuroda	Takaharu Ozaki	November 18, 2018
After a brief rest in town, Goblin Slayer and his party venture back into the sewers to investigate the source of the goblins. Goblin Slayer brings along a canary to warn them of any poison gas as a precaution. The party delves deeper into the sewers but is led into a trap and locked in a tomb. The goblins also begin pumping poison gas into the room, which the canary warns the party of, and they successfully seal off the vents to prevent the gas from entering. The goblins then resort to attacking the party directly, revealing a goblin champion is leading them. The goblin champion critically wounds Goblin Slayer and attacks Priestess as the goblins overwhelm the rest of the party. Motivated by Priestess' screams, Goblin Slayer regains consciousness and attacks the goblin champion from behind, tearing his right eye out in the process. The goblin champion and his minions flee, giving the party the chance to regroup. Priestess' wounds are healed, but Goblin Slayer collapses from his own wounds.
8	8	"Whispers and Prayers and Chants"; Transliteration: "Sasayaki to Inori to Eishō" (Japanese: 囁きと祈りと詠唱)	Yūsuke Kubo	Hideyuki Kurata	Yūsuke Kubo	November 25, 2018
Goblin Slayer wakes in the Temple of Law, having been healed with a Resurrection miracle. Sword Maiden confides in Goblin Slayer she had been captured, raped, and tortured by goblins ten years ago, which is the source of her scars and partial blindness. Despite being one of the heroes who slew the Demon King, she is still deathly afraid of goblins. High Elf Archer, Dwarf Shaman, and Lizard Priest decide to continue scouting the sewers while Goblin Slayer and Priestess spend the day in town recovering and repairing their gear. Witch and Spearman arrive to deliver a mysterious package to Goblin Slayer. Meanwhile, Cow Girl continues to wait for Goblin Slayer's return, despite her uncle's warnings he may not come back one day. The next day, the whole party heads back to the sewers and finds a room guarded by a powerful demon. Goblin Slayer uses the package, which contains fine flour, and spreads it around the room to create a dust explosion. The explosion kills the demon, and the party investigates the mysterious mirror it was guarding.
9	9	"There and Back Again"; Transliteration: "Yukite, Kaerishi" (Japanese: 往きて、還りし)	Haiyūto Michibitsuka	Hideyuki Kurata	Kazuhiro Ozawa	December 2, 2018
The party discovers the mirror is actually a gate linking the sewers of Water Town with the green moon, allowing goblins to enter. As Lizard Priest works to remove the mirror from the wall, the rest of the party repels the goblin counterattack led by the Goblin Champion. Once the mirror is loose, Goblin Slayer has the party take shelter under the mirror while Dwarf Shaman collapses the roof. The goblins are crushed, but the mirror protects the party, leaving them unscathed. The party encases the mirror in cement and sinks it in the river, as they can't guarantee other goblins won't learn to use it. Goblin Slayer reports to Sword Maiden, revealing he suspects she knew more than she let on. Sword Maiden admits the giant alligator is her familiar that guards the sewers, while the mirror was placed by a cult of demon worshipers who the Hero already wiped out. Even though the masterminds were taken out, Sword Maiden delayed doing anything about the goblins because she secretly wanted other people to understand the cruelty goblins are capable of. Goblin Slayer merely replies he cannot save her from her trauma, but he will kill goblins if she asks him, even in her dreams, which alleviates her worries. On the way back to their town, Goblin Slayer tells the rest of the party he plans to make ice treats, and the party promises to help him.
10	10	"Dozing"; Transliteration: "Madoromi no Naka de" (Japanese: まどろみの中で)	Shūji Miyahara	Yōsuke Kuroda	Jun Kamiya	December 9, 2018
The Hero's defeat of the Demon Lord and his army are confirmed, and she becomes the tenth person ever to achieve a platinum rank. Festivities are held across the land. Meanwhile, Goblin Slayer continues his daily chores and accompanies Cow Girl to the town to get his armor repaired. While there, he sees veteran adventurers training rookie adventurers when he encounters the rest of his party, who invite him out for lunch, with Cow Girl and Guild Girl also joining. During the meal, Guild Girl notes the Guild has started a program to have retired adventurers train rookie adventurers, so retired adventurers stay employed, and rookie adventurers have a better chance of surviving. Cow Girl wonders if Goblin Slayer will ever retire. The next day, Goblin Slayer performs more chores around the farm and reads a letter from Sword Maiden, thanking him for his help and telling him she no longer sees goblins in her dreams. That night, Cow Girl shares a moment with Goblin Slayer and tells him he should think about his future. Going to bed, she reflects on the fact Goblin Slayer can't kill goblins forever and wonders what will happen when that time comes. The next day, Goblin Slayer does his daily patrol around the farm and discovers goblin footprints.
10.5	10.5	"Adventure Sheet"; Transliteration: "Adobenchā Shīto" (Japanese: 冒険記録用紙(アドベンチャーシート))	N/A	N/A	N/A	December 16, 2018
A recap special summarizing the events of the first 10 episodes.
11	11	"A Gathering of Adventurers"; Transliteration: "Bōkensha no Kyōen" (Japanese: 冒険者の饗宴)	Kenichi Kawamura	Hideyuki Kurata	Kenichi Kawamura	December 23, 2018
Goblin Slayer concludes that a horde of over a hundred goblins will attack the farm soon. He warns Cow Girl he cannot fight that many goblins in the open and urges her to run, but she refuses to abandon her home for a second time. Goblin Slayer heads to town to ask the other adventurers for help. They refuse at first since there's no quest or reward posted for fighting the goblin horde. Goblin Slayer then offers everything he owns: equipment, assets, knowledge, and time, as the reward for helping him fight. Sensing how serious Goblin Slayer is about the situation, Spearman and Witch agree to fight with him, as well as the two rookie adventurers Goblin Slayer helped, and Goblin Slayer's party also joins without question, for the rewards of food or drink afterward or him joining an adventure. Guild Girl then announces that she's posted a bounty of one gold for each dead goblin, which convinces the rest of the adventurers to join. Goblin Slayer warns the horde's adventurers are being led by a Goblin Lord, a highly intelligent goblin specializing in leadership. He devises an effective strategy for the adventurers to fight the horde, and the first few waves of goblins are easily defeated. The Goblin Lord then sends several hobgoblins and Goblin Champions at the adventurers and attempts to flee but is intercepted by Goblin Slayer.
12	12	"The Fate of an Adventurer"; Transliteration: "Aru Bōkensha no Ketsumatsu" (Japanese: ある冒険者の結末)	Takaharu Ozaki	Hideyuki Kurata	Takaharu Ozaki	December 30, 2018
While the veteran adventurers slay the hobgoblins and Goblin Champions, Goblin Slayer fights the Goblin Lord alone but is defeated. However, when Goblin Slayer is about to be killed, Priestess casts two Protection spells to trap the Goblin Lord. The Goblin Lord attempts to trick Priestess by begging for mercy, but this fails, and Goblin Slayer kills him; it's revealed that this was all part of his plan, acting as bait so Priestess could entrap the Lord. After all the Goblins are killed and the farm secured, the adventurers return to the Guild to celebrate, where Goblin Slayer confides to Cow Girl, who has started to pick up an interest in becoming an adventurer. He removes his helm at Priestess' request as her reward, and the other adventurers are surprised to see his face for the first time. In the epilogue, Priestess narrates that Goblin Slayer is just another pawn on the board to the gods, but the gods have taken an interest in him due to his refusal to let the gods roll the dice on his actions, meaning his fate is completely unknown to them. She then remarks Goblin Slayer is still out there fighting.
