= Goblin Slayer season 2 =

Goblin Slayer II
- Season 2
- No. of episodes: 12

Release
- Original network: AT-X
- Original release: October 6 – December 22, 2023

Season chronology
- ← Previous; Goblin Slayer

Goblin Slayer is an anime television series based on the light novel series of the same title written by Kumo Kagyu and illustrated by Noboru Kannatuki. In January 2021, a second season of the anime series was announced at GA FES 2021. In January 2023, the official Twitter account for the anime confirmed that Liden Films would be taking over from White Fox as the production studio for the second season. The season aired from October 6 to December 22, 2023. The opening theme song is "Entertainment" performed by Mili, while the ending theme song is "Kasumi no Mukō e" (霞の向こうへ; "To the Other Side of the Mist") performed by Yuki Nakashima. On October 19, 2023, Crunchyroll announced that the second season would begin streaming in English dub the following day.

== Episodes ==
No. overall	No. in season	Title (Note: English translated titles are taken from Crunchyroll.)	Directed by	Storyboarded by	Original release date
13	1	"An Ordinary Spring Day"; Transliteration: "Arifureta Haru no Tsuitachi" (Japanese: ありふれた春の一日)	Misato Takada	Misato Takada	October 6, 2023
Months after Noble Fencer is rescued, she has set up a training school for novice adventurers which causes a fresh influx of novices to arrive at the town. Priestess has been an adventurer for over a year and is no longer a novice. Goblin Slayer has become popular and respected by experienced adventurers, and a subject of gossip among novices. An arrogant novice adventurer, Wizard Boy, arrives proclaiming he will kill goblins but Goblin Slayer turns down his request to teach him. Due to Wizard Boy's foolish attitude towards goblins and with nowhere to sleep, Goblin Slayer takes him to Cow Girl's farm. His attitude doesn't improve and he outright refuses Goblin Slayer's advice to practice hunting rats first. Priestess is saddened to learn that she has been passed over for promotion to the next adventurer rank due to the belief she is being carried by her Silver-ranked party members, so High Elf Archer suggests she should party with adventurers closer to her own rank. Wizard Boy mocks Priestess' indecisiveness but his arrogance quickly alienates all the other adventurers. Female Knight then intervenes and challenges Wizard Boy to prove himself by killing a goblin while teamed up with Priestess as his party leader.
14	2	"The Red-Haired Wizard Boy"; Transliteration: "Akage no Shōnen Majutsushi" (Japanese: 赤毛の少年魔術師)	Shunji Yoshida	Misato Takada	October 13, 2023
Priestess takes the lead on the next goblin slaying quest and learns about an adventurer party has already gone missing, worrying Priestess at the fate of the female adventurers. Wizard Boy is baffled that they actually stop to decide on tactics, still insisting goblins are unintelligent beasts. They start killing goblins but Wizard Boy is angry that they are moving too slowly. He foolishly rushes ahead upon hearing a female prisoner being tortured and though he kills his first goblin, he is surrounded by goblins and a troll. Priestess starts to panic so Goblin Slayer takes charge, quickly formulating a plan that kills the troll and the goblins, and rescues the prisoner. Wizard Boy still refuses to admit Goblin Slayer was right about goblins, revealing his older sister was killed by goblins on her first quest and was mocked by her classmates for it. He is determined to prove her death was due to bad luck and not because she was actually defeated by mere goblins. Priestess realizes his sister was Wizard, one of her teammates who died the day she met Goblin Slayer. Goblin Slayer also realizes this and leaves to be alone, feeling guilty about his failure to save Wizard.
15	3	"The Training Grounds on the Outskirts of Town"; Transliteration: "Machihazure no Kunrenba" (Japanese: 町外れの訓練場)	Sekijuu Sekino	Jun'ichi Sakata	October 20, 2023
Goblin Slayer and the other adventurers begin mentoring trainees at Noble Fencer's new training grounds. Spearman insists Goblin Slayer to join him and Heavy Warrior for a boy's night out. Wizard Boy complains to trainees Rookie Warrior, Rhea Fighter and Apprentice Cleric about Goblin Slayer but finds them unsympathetic as Goblin Slayer has killed thousands of goblins, whereas Wizard Boy almost died due to his arrogance and had to be rescued. Goblin Slayer attends a boy's night out. Spearman and Heavy Warrior are perplexed that Goblin Slayer refuses to date until all goblins are dead. Heavy Warrior dreams of becoming a wise king while Spearman wants to be famous for doing good deeds. Goblin Slayer recalls he once dreamed of being a hero. As it is too late for their own dreams, they decide to support the trainees' dreams instead. Dwarf Shaman tutors Wizard Boy on using his spells more efficiently. Priestess teams up with Rhea Fighter for a quest to gain experience. Cow Girl suspects Goblin Slayer is socialising more to avoid thinking about a new village being built where his childhood home was destroyed by goblins. Goblin Slayer admits he can't yet move on from what happened and leaves to meet the trainees, unaware of Cow Girl struggles with loneliness when he leaves. Later that evening, goblins attack the training ground so Goblin Slayer prepares to fight.
16	4	"Onward to Adventure"; Transliteration: "Soshite Bōken e" (Japanese: そして冒険へ)	Hazuki Mizumoto	Masayoshi Nishida	October 27, 2023
Goblin Slayer is joined by Priestess and the other adventurers who determine that a shaman is leading the goblins tunneling to the surface. Due to his size, Heavy Warrior stays to protect the children while everyone else enters the tunnels. Priestess volunteers to lead the trainees to attack the goblins who are hunting the other trainee group. Goblin Slayer's group kill the shaman underground. Priestess reaches the other trainees, several dead already, and organizes a safe escape. Wizard Boy hesitates out of fear but after recalling a lesson from Dwarf Shaman, he uses a spell to deafen the goblins, knowing his immediate goal is to protect the trainees, not to kill goblins. Goblin Slayer's team flood the tunnels from a lake, collapsing it on the main nest. Afterwards, Priestess is promoted to Steel Rank. Wizard Boy, having gotten over his bad attitude, admits goblin killing isn't for him and plans to start adventuring, learn new spells and slay a dragon. He is flustered that Rhea Fighter insists on teaming up with him, amusing Goblin Slayer so much to the point where he actually laughs and advises them to visit his old Rhea friend, Burglar. Cow Girl is delighted that Goblin Slayer is happier, but scolds him for completely draining the lake they swam in as children.
17	5	"Beard-cutter, to the Southern River"; Transliteration: "Kami Kiri Maru, Minami no Kawa e" (Japanese: かみきり丸、南の川へ)	Mitsukuni Samoto	Susumu Nishizawa	November 3, 2023
High Elf Archer is invited to bring her friends to the wedding of her older sister, so she invites her party and Guild Girl. Goblin Slayer is reluctant as the other adventurers would have to take over his goblin killing, but he settles for destroying several goblin nests before they leave. While clearing the goblins from a monastery and rescuing the raped nuns, Dwarf Shaman realizes the goblins were trying to steal the stone tablets in an ancient language. Cow Girl is also invited to the wedding and teases Goblin Slayer that they might marry one day. As it is on the way, they are paid by the guild to deliver the tablets to the temple in Water Town to determine its purpose. Sword Maiden, who no longer suffers nightmares thanks to Goblin Slayer, is irked that he shows no affection for her but determines that the tablet refers to ancient magic. As it does not mention goblins, Goblin Slayer deems it of no use and donates it to the temple. As the rest of the journey is by boat, Sword Maiden warns them of a sudden spike in sunken ships. As they voyage upriver, they enter a fjord with steep cliffs and are ambushed by falling boulders that are dropped by someone.
18	6	"The Elven King's Forest"; Transliteration: "Erufuō no Mori" (Japanese: エルフ王の森)	Yoshitsugu Kimura	Yoshiaki Okumura	November 10, 2023
The ambushers are goblins so Priestess shields the raft with a barrier. The goblins block the fjord with shipwrecks, until Priestess uses her new healing spell to cleanse away the rotten wood, destroying the dam in the progress. Goblin Slayer swears to destroy the nest on their return. They camp for the night while the girls catch for fishes and swim in bikinis, though are disappointed by Goblin Slayer's lack of reaction. In the morning, they are found by Elder Brother, High Elf Archer's sister's fiancé, who reports his men have killed the goblins. He also reports of the creature called One Who Stops Water, a beast from ancient times who occasionally roams the forest. They meet High Elf Archer's sister, Forest Princess. Goblin Slayer also encounters the elf girl he rescued after meeting Priestess, and tells her he killed every goblin that raped her, just as he promised. Forest Princess believes High Elf Archer should stop adventuring or mixing with other species, especially dwarves and Goblin Slayer, who is far from the famous hero she expected. High Elf Archer refuses as she is content with her career and friends, and trusts Goblin Slayer with her life. Suddenly, a dragon-like creature called One Who Stops Water appears, causing chaos and panic.
19	7	"Jungle Cruise"; Transliteration: "Janguru Kurūzu" (Japanese: ジャングル・クルーズ)	Isoroku Koga	Isoroku Koga	November 17, 2023
Priestess insists on moving One Who Stops Water away from the village rather than killing it. Goblin Slayer notices a goblin riding the creature, trying to steer it. High Elf Archer kills the goblin, allowing Dwarf Shaman, Lizard Priest and Goblin Slayer to capture One Who Stops Water. Forest Princess stops trying to convince High Elf Archer to stay but asks her to visit more often. At Elder Brother's impromptu stag party, Goblin Slayer deduces goblins are nesting nearby. As they become drunk, Goblin Slayer blames himself for his sister's death. Sword Maiden deciphers the tablet and realises it will be of use to Goblin Slayer. Goblin Slayer decides to kill the goblins before the wedding. Cow Girl bids him farewell, once again hopes that he will return. Sailing upriver, they find elves tortured to death and discover the goblins have settled in an elven fortress that dams the river, the namesake of One Who Stops Water. Infiltrating they discover goblins have been poisoning the river with rotten flesh from their elf victims, which was then drunk by the elves downstream as a blood curse, meaning the goblins have a shaman. Priestess is disturbed by the elven bodies and the evidence of atrocious tortures. Goblin Slayer apologises to High Elf Archer that goblins have interrupted their trip, and admits he doesn't think he will ever have a fun adventure, as long as goblins exist.
20	8	"Heart of Darkness"; Transliteration: "Hāto obu Dākunesu" (Japanese: 闇の奥(ハートオブダークネス))	Shunji Yoshida	Jun'ichi Sakata	November 24, 2023
The group begins hunting the shaman. Making it to the roof, they find the shaman and an army of 100 goblins. Priestess uses Purification to temporarily turn the blood in the shaman's body to water, leaving him unconscious. The group uses Dwarf Shaman's magic to safely leap from the roof while the traps that Goblin Slayer set earlier flood the roof with river water, pushing the remaining goblins off the roof to their deaths. Priestess begins to fear that she is misusing her miracles granted by the Earth Mother and may be deemed unworthy, but she feels reassured when the flooding water produces a rainbow. Elsewhere, Hero and her party battle demons at a Gate to Hell that will soon reopen, but sense that a change to the flow of the river has weakened the Gate, which will make closing it again much easier. Hero resolves to thank the ones who killed the goblin shaman, if she ever meets them. Goblin Slayer and the others attend the wedding and Goblin Slayer becomes quietly emotional that his own sister died unmarried. Forest Princess bestows a gift to the unmarried girls, her wedding tiara, to bless them with success in finding a husband, though which girl catches it is not revealed. After a party that lasts for three days, everyone returns home.
21	9	"Once There Was Youth, Now There Is Nothing but Ash"; Transliteration: "Katsute Atta Seishun, Ima Soko ni Aru Hai" (Japanese: かつてあった青春 今そこにある灰)	Misato Takada, Sekijuu Sekino	Satoshi Shimizu	December 1, 2023
Many years ago, Sword Maiden and her team defeat two demons, yet Sword Maiden is more thankful there were no goblins. Having mistakenly accepted a job to kill sea goblins, which turned out to be innocent gill-men, Goblin Slayer and the others ended up hunting a giant sea serpent. The grateful gill-men rewards them with ocean treasure; Goblin Slayer gives his share, a rare seashell, to Cow Girl as a gift. Sword Maiden visits Goblin Slayer personally. Goblins are targeting travellers between Water Town and Capital City; she must visit the archbishop there but is too afraid to journey on her own, so she wants Goblin Slayer as her bodyguard. Before leaving, Goblin Slayer speaks with Cow Girl, which upsets Sword Maiden. While at night camping, Sword Maiden is terrified and seeks reassurance from Goblin Slayer; but goblins ambush them, so he locks her in the carriage with her nun handmaid. After killing them, Goblin Slayer deduces more goblins are close, probably with human prisoners. He also notices the goblins all possess tattoos of a clawed hand. Reaching Capital City, their entry is delayed due to the King returning from a tax dispute. Guards doubt Goblin Slayer's silver rank badge until Sword Maiden vouches for him. Seeing the city for the first time, Goblin Slayer regrets he couldn't bring his sister to see it with him.
22	10	"City Adventure"; Transliteration: "Shiti Adobenchā" (Japanese: 都邑の冒険(シティ・アドベンチャー))	Daiki Handa	Daiki Handa	December 8, 2023
King's sister, Princess, yearns to be an adventurer. Delivering Sword Maiden to the temple, everyone separates to carry out various tasks. Dwarf Shaman notices Goblin Slayer is troubled; he admits lately he has been having fun and feels guilty he hasn't been killing goblins. Lizard Priest reassures him that no one can focus on one goal indefinitely without a break. Priestess visits a bathhouse with High Elf Archer. Princess encounters Priestess in the baths while hiding her identity. Later, Priestess tearfully discovers all her equipment stolen from the changing room. Goblin Slayer sympathizes for her loss as he was supposed to inherit a knife from his father, but it disappeared when goblins killed his sister. Sword Maiden decides to ask King about the unacceptable theft of holy equipment. King is preoccupied as a meteor recently struck Holy Mount, a mountain where monsters dwell, so he sends for Hero. Word suddenly arrives that Princess foolishly snuck out; revealing she was the one who stole Priestess' equipment, ignorantly thinking that wearing her equipment would keep her safe against monsters, but her carriage got attacked and she was easily kidnapped by goblins near Holy Mount. King fears sending his army since Princess stealing holy equipment would be a public scandal. Sword Maiden panics when King asks her to rescue Princess by herself, but is joyfully relieved when Goblin Slayer barges into the meeting and volunteers instead.
23	11	"The Princess's Ordeal"; Transliteration: "Ōjo no Junan" (Japanese: 王女の受難)	Mitsukuni Samoto	Yoshiaki Okumura	December 15, 2023
King sends Hero to investigate Holy Mount. Noble Fencer provides Goblin Slayer with horses while Sword Maiden provides a map of the closest dungeon and a ribbon that acts as the key. She also warns them to avoid going below level 4 or their deaths are unavoidable. After they leave, Noble Fencer asks if Sword Maiden will ever go adventuring again. Sword Maiden admits she is too scared and Noble Fencer sympathises with her as they were both raped by goblins in the past. At the site of Princess' kidnap, Priestess retrieves her holy staff. They are ambushed as soon as they enter the dungeon, forcing Goblin Slayer to use another teleportation scroll to teleport the goblins away to their deaths. On Holy Mount, Hero is baffled when dead goblins randomly fall from the sky. On level 4, they find a goblin shaman has evolved into a goblin priest and is planning to sacrifice Princess in a blood ritual, having already sacrificed dozens of humans and elves. Priestess uses her Purification spell to turn the spilled blood to water, ruining the ritual in the progress. With the goblins dead and his magic gone, Goblin Slayer beats the goblin priest to death and rescues Princess.
24	12	"O Prayers, Have You Reached Heaven?"; Transliteration: "Inori yo, Ten ni Todoite Iru ka" (Japanese: 祈りよ、天に届いているか)	Yu Harima	Kazuya Sakamoto	December 22, 2023
The barely alive goblin priest uses a drop of its own blood to complete the ritual and summons the giant clawed hand of a demon that attacks them. Working together, they push the hand into a lift shaft controlled by Sword Maiden's ribbon and crush the hand between the lift and Priestess' barrier. Despite their injuries, they slowly fight past goblins to return to the surface, but find 200 goblins waiting for them. They hope to die quickly in battle rather than be tortured, but they are rescued by an army of adventurers led by Sword Maiden, who came despite her overwhelming fear. Back in the city, it is revealed the kidnapping and demon summoning was arranged by a noble conspiring with cultists to weaken King's political position and take power for himself. Their meeting is abruptly interrupted by an attack from Knight of Diamonds, who defeats them all. Princess returns back to her home and decides to begin worshipping the Earth Mother and become a real mage like Priestess. Goblin Slayer begins to fear that nothing will change as goblin populations keep growing, forcing him to keep fighting forever. He returns to Cow Girl's home, uncertain about his future.
