= Kubo Won't Let Me Be Invisible =

Japanese manga series by Nene Yukimori

- First tankōbon volume cover

久保さんは僕を許さない (Kubo-san wa Mobu o Yurusanai)
- Genre: Romantic comedy
- Manga
- Written by: Nene Yukimori
- Published by: Shueisha
- English publisher: NA: Viz Media
- Imprint: Young Jump Comics
- Magazine: Weekly Young Jump
- Original run: October 24, 2019 – March 2, 2023
- Volumes: 12
- Anime television series
- Directed by: Kazuomi Koga
- Written by: Yūya Takahashi
- Music by: Kujira Yumemi
- Studio: Pine Jam
- Licensed by: Sentai Filmworks: SA/SEA: Medialink
- Original network: AT-X, Tokyo MX, BS11, MBS
- English network: SEA: Animax Asia
- Original run: January 10, 2023 – June 20, 2023
- Episodes: 12
- icon

Kubo Won't Let Me Be Invisible (Japanese: 久保さんは僕(モブ)を許さない, Hepburn: Kubo-san wa Mobu o Yurusanai; Kubo Won't Give Up The Mob (Is Me)) (Note: The kanji 僕 in the Japanese title meaning "I/me" (commonly used by Japanese boys) are normally read as boku (ぼく), glossed with furigana as mobu (モブ), Japanese spelling from "mob".) is a Japanese manga series written and illustrated by Nene Yukimori. It was serialized in Shueisha's seinen manga magazine Weekly Young Jump from October 2019 to March 2023, with its chapters collected in 12 tankōbon volumes. An anime television series adaptation produced by Pine Jam aired from January to June 2023.

== Premise ==
High school student Junta Shiraishi is so ordinary and quiet that his classmates and teachers do not notice him at all, as if he were a mob character in a video game, that is, until his female classmate Nagisa Kubo pays attention to him and dares him to do things that would make him stand out.

== Characters ==
Junta Shiraishi (白石 純太, Shiraishi Junta)
Voiced by: Kengo Kawanishi
For no discernable reason, most people are unable to notice that Shiraishi is present unless he does something to stand out. He has accepted this condition and is self-conscious about making a scene. He is a member of the school's environmental committee, but because of his lack of presence, others do not notice him taking care of the school plants and thus believe that they mysteriously grow without anyone taking care of them.
Nagisa Kubo (久保 渚咲, Kubo Nagisa)
Voiced by: Kana Hanazawa
Junta's classmate and the only one who gives him attention. She is fond of teasing him. She is an intelligent student and ranked second during her first-year final exams. She has bad cooking skills.
Akina Kubo (久保 明菜, Kubo Akina)
Voiced by: Miku Itō
Nagisa's older sister who works at a bookstore. She can also see Junta. She is also fond of teasing just like Nagisa.
Saki Kubo (久保 沙貴, Kubo Saki)
Voiced by: Sora Amamiya
Nagisa and Akina's younger cousin. Like the others in the family, she has no problem noticing Junta. She looks up to and emulates Nagisa and is slightly jealous of the attention that she gives Junta.
Hazuki Kudō (工藤 葉月, Kudō Hazuki)
Voiced by: Ai Kakuma
Hazuki is a fellow classmate to Shiraishi, Kubo, Tama and later Sudo and also initially a friend to the latter three. She does eventually get to meet Shiraishi and quickly comes around to befriending him as well. She tends to be the straight man of the group, usually putting a stop to Tama and Sudo's shenanigans if they have gone too far. Despite that, she isn't a kill joy, and likes to partake in any activities that the friend group engages in, such as study groups, sport competitions and even teases Nagisa on occasions.
Tamao Taira (平 玉緒, Taira Tamao)
Voiced by: Ayana Taketatsu
A bubbly and energetic gal, Taira Tamao (usually referred to as Tama) tends to act and speak before thinking things through. This usually means that she tends to make comments that might be embarrassing or hurtful to others without realizing it. That said, her friends recognize this and have come to terms that she usually doesn't do it out of malice. She tends to come up with schemes and silly shenanigans anytime she meets up with her childhood friend Sudo, with which she shares rather poor grades in their school classes.
Sudo Yuma (須藤 勇真, Yuma Sudo)
Sudo, a classmate of Shiraishi, befriends him after Kubo facilitates their conversation. Admiring Shiraishi's prior work on the Environmental Committee, Sudo expresses his desire to befriend him. Already friends with Tama, Hazuki, and Kubo, Sudo helps Shiraishi connect with the group. Upon learning of Shiraishi's feelings for Kubo, Sudo supports him as a devoted wingman.
Yoshie Shiraishi (白石 由恵, Shiraishi Yoshie)
Voiced by: Mamiko Noto
Seita Shiraishi (白石 誠太, Shiraishi Seita)
Voiced by: Mariya Ise
Junta's preschool aged little brother. He adores his kind big brother.
Unzen-sensei (雲仙先生)
Voiced by: Naoki Tatsuta

== Media ==
=== Manga ===
Written and illustrated by Nene Yukimori, Kubo Won't Let Me Be Invisible was serialized in Shueisha's seinen manga magazine Weekly Young Jump from October 24, 2019, to March 2, 2023. Shueisha has collected its chapters in 12 tankōbon volumes, released from February 19, 2020, to April 18, 2023. The final volume includes an extra epilogue chapter set after the main story.

The series is simultaneously published in English and Spanish on Shueisha's Manga Plus service and Viz Media's Shonen Jump website. Viz Media licensed the series for print publication in North America.

==== Volumes ====
No.	Original release date	Original ISBN	English release date	English ISBN
1	February 19, 2020	978-4-08-891476-3	May 3, 2022	978-1-9747-2968-5
Chapter 1: Costar Girl and Invisible Boy (ヒロイン女じょ子しとモブ男だん子し, Hiroin joshi to mobu danshi); Chapter 2: Bad Mood and on One's Lap (ご機き嫌げん斜ななめと膝ひざの上うえ, Gokigen Naname to hiza no ue?); Chapter 3: Right to Answer and Meddling (回かい答とう権けんとお節せっ介かい, Kaitō-ken to osekkai); Chapter 4: Pocket Tissues and Selfie (ポケットティッシュとセルフィー, Poketto tisshu to serufī); Chapter 5: Ponytail and Body Wipes (ポニーテールと制せい汗かんシート, Ponītēru to seikan shīto); Chapter 6: Automatic Doors and the Way to School (自じ動どう扉とびらと通つう学がく路ろ, Jidō tobira to tsūgaku-ro); Chapter 7: Hard Luck and a Home Visit (ハードラックと自じ宅たく訪ほう問もん, Hādorakku to jitaku hōmon); Chapter 8: Morning Routine and an Ordinary Day (朝あさ支し度たくと何なにもない日び, Asa shitaku to nanimonai-bi); Chapter 9: Snow and Hot Chocolate (雪ゆきとホットココア, Yuki to hotto kokoa); Chapter 10: Bookstore and Complex (本ほん屋やとコンプレックス, Hon'ya to konpurekkusu); Extra: Dozing Off (居い眠ねむり, Inemuri); Extra: Height Difference (身しん長ちょう差さ, Shinchō-sa); Extra: The Nobody's Gift (凡ぼん者しゃの贈おくり物もの, Bonsha no okurimono)
2	June 19, 2020	978-4-08-891550-0	July 5, 2022	978-1-9747-3215-9
Chapter 11: New Year's Countdown and Video Call (ゆく年としとテレビ電でん話わ, Yuku toshi to terebi denwa); Chapter 12: Socks and an Off Feeling (靴くつ下したと違い和わ感かん, Kutsushita to iwakan); Chapter 13: Red Heart and Secret Admirer (赤あかいハートと送おくり主ぬし, Akai hāto to okurinushi); Chapter 14: Bad Cook and Valentine's Eve (料りょう理り音おん痴ちとバレンタイン・イブ, Ryōri onchi to Barentain ibu); Chapter 15: Girl Talk and Possessiveness (ガールズトークと独どく占せん欲よく, Gāruzutōku to dokusen yoku); Chapter 16: First Time and Matcha Latte (初はつ体たい験けんと抹まっ茶ちゃラテ, Shotaiken to matcha rate); Chapter 17: Up Early and Earphone Jack (早はや起おきとイヤホンジャック, Hayaoki to iyahonjakku); Chapter 18: White Day and a Destination for Feelings (ホワイトデーと感かん情じょうの宛あて先さき, Howaitodē to kanjō no atesaki); Chapter 19: DNA and Admiration (DNAとあこがれ, DNA to akogare); Chapter 20: Glasses and Studying for Exams (眼め鏡がねとテスト勉べん強きょう, Megane to tesuto benkyō); Extra: Frequency of Your Voice (君きみの声こえの周しゅう波は数すう, Kimi no koe no shūhasū); Extra: Bed Head (寝ね癖ぐせ, Neguse); Extra: Student I.D. (生せい徒と手て帳ちょう, Seito techō); Extra: After the RINE Swap: Junta Shiraishi POV (RINE交こう換かんのあと-side。白しら石いし純じゅん太た, RINE Kōkan no ato -side。 Shiraishi Junta-); Extra: After the RINE Swap: Nagisa Kubo POV (RINE交こう換かんのあと-side。久く保ぼ渚なぎ咲さ, RINE Kōkan no ato -side。Kubo Nagisa-)
3	September 18, 2020	978-4-08-891654-5	September 6, 2022	978-1-9747-3389-7
Chapter 21: Home Sick and Accidental Text (病びょう欠けつと誤ご送そう信しん, Byōketsu to go sōshin); Chapter 22: Nurse's Office and Protagonist (保ほ健けん室しつと主しゅ人じん公こう, Hoken-shitsu to shujinkō); Chapter 23: Rainy Day and Way Home (雨あめの日ひと帰かえり道みち, Ame no hi to kaerimichi); Chapter 24: Lunch Break and Rolled Omelets (昼ひる休やすみと玉たま子ご焼やき, Hiruyasumi to tamago-yaki); Chapter 25: Power Move and Definition of Friendly (マウントと仲なか良よしの定てい義ぎ, Maunto to nakayoshi no teigi); Chapter 26: Red Pen and Matching (赤あかペンとおそろい, Aka pen to osoroi); Chapter 27: Sleepover and Next School Year (お泊とまり会かいと次つぎの学がく年ねん, Otomari-kai to tsugi no gakunen); Chapter 28: All You Can Fit and Invitation (詰つめ放ほう題だいとお誘さそい, Tsume-hōdai to osasoi); Chapter 29: Second Try and First Success (再さい挑ちょう戦せんと初はつ成せい功こう, Sai chōsen to hatsu seiko); Chapter 30: Picnic and Hamburg Steak (お花はな見みとハンバーグ, O hanami to hanbāgu); Chapter 31: Picnic and Miscommunication (お花はな見みとすれ違ちがい, O hanami to surechigai); Chapter 32: New School Year and Class Change (新しん学がっ期きとクラス替がえ, Shin gakki to kurasu-gae); Extra: Transform! (変へん身しん, Henshin!)
4	February 19, 2021	978-4-08-891781-8	November 1, 2022	978-1-9747-3390-3
Chapter 33: Committee and Flower Beds (委い員いん会かいと花か壇だん, Iinkai to kadan); Chapter 34: Friend and Bridge (友とも達だちと橋はし渡わたし, Tomodachi to hashiwatashi); Chapter 35: Lemon and Youth (レモンと青せい春しゅん, Remon to seishun); Chapter 36: Chalkboard Erasers and Favorite Hairstyle (黒こく板ばん消けしと好すきな髪かみ型がた, Kokuban keshi to sukina kamigata); Chapter 37: First Errand (はじめてのおつかい, Hajimete nō tsukai); Chapter 38: Comparing Heights and Wall Pin (背せい比くらべと壁かべドン, Seikurabe to kabedon); Chapter 39: Measurements Day and Track Jacket (身しん体たい測そく定ていとジャージ, Shintai sokutei to jāji); Chapter 40: Movie Version and Crowded Train (劇げき場じょう版ばんと満まん員いん電でん車しゃ, Gekijō-ban to man'in densha); Chapter 41: Chatted Up and Movie Length (ナンパと上じょう映えい時じ間かん, Nanpa to jōei jikan); Chapter 42: Sugarless and Sugar (無む糖とうと砂さ糖とう, Mutō to sato); Chapter 43: Movie Theater and Facial Muscles (映えい画が館かんと表ひょう情じょう筋きん, Eigakan to hyōjō-kin); Chapter 44: Junta Shiraishi (白しら石いし純じゅん太た, Shiraishi Junta); Extra: Staring Contest (にらめっこ, Niramekko)
5	June 18, 2021	978-4-08-892009-2	January 3, 2023	978-1-9747-3391-0
Chapter 45: Coffee and Independent Sister (コーヒーと姉あね離はなれ, Kōhī to ane hanare); Chapter 46: Psychological Tests and Deep Psyche (心しん理りテストと深しん層そう心しん理り, Shinri tesuto to shinsō shinri); Chapter 47: Starring Role and Gift (主しゅ役やくとお祝いわい, Shuyaku to oiwai); Chapter 48: Love Letter and Challenge Letter (ラブレターと果はたし状じょう, Raburetā to hatashijō); Chapter 49: Lingerie and Color Choice (下した着ぎと色いろ選えらび, Shitagi to iro erabi); Chapter 50: Summer Uniform and Defenses (夏なつ服ふくと防ぼう御ぎょ力りょく, Natsufuku to bōgyo-ryoku); Chapter 51: Body Wipes and Same Scent (制せい汗かんシートと同おなじ香かおり, Seikan shīto to onaji kaori); Chapter 52: Park and White Clover (公こう園えんとシロツメクサ, Kōen to shirotsumekusa); Chapter 53: Junta and Mom (純じゅん太たとお母かあさん, Junta to okāsan); Chapter 54: Sports Day and Events (体たい育いく祭さいと参さん加か種しゅ目もく, Taiikumatsuri to sanka shumoku); Chapter 55: Independent Practice and Three-Legged Race (自じ主しゅ練れんと二に人にん三さん脚きゃく, Jishu neri to nininsankyaku); Chapter 56: Heroic and Friendship Power (浪ろう漫まんと仲なか良よしパワー, Rouman to nakayoshi pawā); Extra: Enrollment Gift (入にゅう学がく祝いわい, Nyūgaku iwai)
6	September 17, 2021	978-4-08-892073-3	March 7, 2023	978-1-9747-3392-7
Chapter 57: All You've Got and Regret (全ぜん力りょくと悔くや根こん, Zenryoku to Kuyakon); Chapter 58: Competition and Adolescence (競きょう争そうと青せい春しゅん, Kyōsō to seishun); Chapter 59: Exams and Room Cleaning (テストと部へ屋や掃そう除じ, Tesuto to heya sōji); Chapter 60: Room and Twosome (部へ屋やとニに人にん, Heya to ni nin); Chapter 61: Something Forgotten and Seat Neighbors (忘わすれ物ものと隣となりの席せき, Wasuremono to tonari no seki); Chapter 62: Exams and Standing on One's Tiptoes (テストと背せ伸のび, Tesuto to senobi); Chapter 63: All-Nighter and Nightwear (夜よ更ふかしと部へ屋や着ぎ, Yofukashi to heyagi); Chapter 64: Rain and Sleepover (雨あめふりとお泊とまり, Amefuri to o tomari); Chapter 65: Drowsy and After School (睡すい魔まと放ほう課か後ご, Suima to hōkago); Chapter 66: Sense of Distance and Friends (距きょ離り感かんと友とも達だち, Kyori-kan to tomodachi); Extra: Kubo Won't Let Me Be Invisible: The First Take (Original One-Shot) (久く保ぼさんは僕モブを許ゆるさない the first take (読よみ切きり版はん), Kubo-san wa Mobu o Yurusanai the first take (Yomikiri-ban))
7	November 19, 2021	978-4-08-892118-1	May 2, 2023	978-1-9747-3690-4
Chapter 67: School Camping Trip and Bus (林りん間かん学がっ校こうとバス, Rinkan gakkō to basu); Chapter 68: Curry and Good Cook (カレーと料りょう理り上じょう年ず, Karē to Ryōri jōzu); Chapter 69: Courage Walk and Horror (肝きも試だめしとホラー, Kimodameshi to horā); Chapter 70: Fear and Reliance (不ふ安あんと信しん頼らい, Fuan to shinrai); Chapter 71: Uselessness and Reassuring (不ふ甲が斐いなさと心しん強つよさ, Fugaina-sa to shin tsuyo-sa); Chapter 72: Hiking and a Little Wish (山やま登のぼりと小ちいさな願ねがい, Yamanobori to chīsana negai); Chapter 73: Bus and Summer (バスと夏なつ, Basu to natsu); Chapter 74: Summer and Under Her Skirt (夏なつとスカートの中なか, Natsu to sukāto no naka); Chapter 75: Hiccups and Surprise (しゃっくりとびっくり, Shakkuri to bikkuri); Chapter 76: Voice and Writing (声こえと文も字じ, Koe to moji); Chapter 77: Ice Cream and Good Deeds Card (アイスといいことカード, Aisu to Ī koto kādo); Chapter 78: End-of-Term Exams and Emergency (期き末まつ試し験けんと緊きん急きゅう事じ想たい, Kimatsu shiken to kinkyū jitai); Extra: Unzen-sensei (雲うん仙ぜん先せん生せい, Unzen sensei)
8	February 18, 2022	978-4-08-892214-0	July 4, 2023	978-1-9747-3747-5
Chapter 79: Effort and Results (努ど力りょくと結けっ果か, Doryoku to kekka); Chapter 80: Bonehead and Summer Vacation (ボーンヘッドと夏なつ休やす, Bōnheddo to natsuyasumi); Chapter 81: Flower Beds and Carbonation (花か壇だんと炭たん酸さん, Kadan to tansan); Chapter 82: Summer Job and Choosing Swimsuits (アルバイトと水みず着ぎ選えらび, Arubaito to mizugi erabi); Chapter 83: Beach Shack and the Kubo Problem (海うみの家いえと久く保ぼさん問もん題だい, Umi no ie to Kubo-san mondai); Chapter 84: Sandy Beach and Saltwater (砂すな浜はまと塩えん水すい, Sunahama to ensui); Chapter 85: Her Back and the Shade of Rocks (岩いわ陰かげと背せ中なか, Iwakage to senaka); Chapter 86: Chocolate and Bedroom (チョコレートと寝しん室しつ, Chokorēto to shinshitsu); Chapter 87: Drunk and Drawing Near (酔よいと寄より, Yoi to yori); Chapter 88: The Gang and the Group Call (みんなとグループ通つう話わ, Min'na to gurūpu tsūwa); Chapter 89: Bubbles and Iridescence (シャボン玉だまとカクテル光こう線せん, Shabondama to kakuteru kōsen); Chapter 90: Present and Two Boys (贈おくり物ものと男だん子し二ふた人り, Okurimono to danshi futari)
9	May 18, 2022	978-4-08-892299-7	September 5, 2023	978-1-9747-4043-7
Chapter 91: Meetup and Cake (待まち合あわせとケーキ, Machiawase to kēki); Chapter 92: Photo Booth and Present (プリクラとプレゼント, Purikura to purezento); Chapter 93: Way Back and Timing (帰かえり道みちとタイミング, Kaerimichi to taimingu); Chapter 94: Night and Letter (夜よると手て紙がみ, Yoru to tegami); Chapter 95: Bangs and Forehead (前まえ髪がみとおでこ, Maegami to odeko); Chapter 96: Classroom and Chalk Art (教きょう室しつとチョークアート, Kyōshitsu to chōkuāto); Chapter 97: Yukata and Fireworks Show (浴ゆかた衣と花はな火び大たい会かい, Yukata to hanabi taikai); Chapter 98: Stalls and Crowds (屋や台たいと人ひと混ごみ, Yatai to hitogomi); Chapter 99: Lost and Searching (迷まい子ごと捜そう索さく, Maigo to sōsaku); Chapter 100: Late Summer and Fireworks (晩ばん夏かと花はな火び, Banka to hanabi); Chapter 101: Heading Home and Bandages (帰き路ろと絆ばん創そう膏こう, Kiro to bansōkō); Chapter 102: Homework and Memories (宿しゅく題だいと思おもい出で, Shukudai to omoide)
10	September 16, 2022	978-4-08-892432-8	November 7, 2023	978-1-9747-4124-3
Chapter 103: Apple Pie and Akina (アップルパイと明あき菜なさん, Appuru pai to Akina-san); Chapter 104: New Term and Greetings (新しん学がっ期きとあいさつ, Shin gakki to aisatsu); Chapter 105: Muscles and Upper Arm (カこぶとニの腕うで, Kako buto ninoude); Chapter 106: Winter Clothes and Pockets (冬ふゆ服ふくとポケット, Fuyufuku to poketto); Chapter 107: Palms and Hand Cream (てのひらとハンドクリーム, Tenohira to handokurīmu); Chapter 108: Mother and Son (母ははと息むす子こ, Haha to musuko); Chapter 109: School Festival and Roles (文ぶん化か祭さいと適てき役やく, Bunkasai to tekiyaku); Chapter 110: Nagisa Kubo (久く保ぼ渚なぎ咲さ, Kubo Nagisa); Chapter 111: Spotlight and Missed Connections (脚きゃっ光こうとすれ違ちがい, Kyakkō to surechigai); Chapter 112: Sent Shopping and Brilliant Idea (買かい出だしと妙みょう案あん, Kaidashi to myōan); Chapter 113: Romeo and Juliet (ロミオとジュリエット, Romio to Jurietto); Chapter 114: School Festival and Haunted House (文ぶん化か祭さいとお化ばけ屋や敷しき, Bunkasai to obakeyashi); Chapter 115: Meetup and Crush (待まち合あわせと好すきな人ひと, Machiawase to sukinahito)
11	December 19, 2022	978-4-08-892567-7	January 2, 2024	978-1-9747-4290-5
Chapter 116: Award Ceremony and Results Announced (表ひょう彰しょう式しきと結けっ果か発はっ表ぴょう, Hyōshō-shiki to kekka happyō); Chapter 117: Way Home and Celebration (帰き路ろと祝しゅく賀が会かい, Kiro to shukugakai); Chapter 118: Lost In Thought and Realization (考かんがえ事ごとと自じ覚かく, Kangaegoto to jikaku); Chapter 119: Spark and Buildup (きっかけと積つみ重かさね, Kikkake to tsumikasane); Chapter 120: Shiraishi's House and All Together (白しら石いし家いえと全ぜん員いん集しゅう合ごう, Shiraishi ie to zen'in shūgō); Chapter 121: The Game of Life and a Big Family (人じん生せいゲームと子こだくさん, Jinsei gēmu to kodakusan); Chapter 122: Bento Box Lunch and Practice's Payoff (お弁べん当とうと練れん習しゅうの成せい果か, O bentō to renshū no seika); Chapter 123: Favorite Person and Crush (好すきな人ひとと好すきな人ひと, Sukinahito to sukinahito); Chapter 124: Saki and Nagisa (沙さ貴きと渚なぎ咲さ, Saki to Nagisa); Chapter 125: Gaze and Type (視し線せんとタイプ, Shisen to taipu); Chapter 126: Class Trip and Free Time (修しゅう学がく旅りょ行こうと自じ由ゆう行こう動どう, Shūgakuryokō to jiyū kōdō); Chapter 127: Just the Two of Us and a Coward (二ふた人りきりと意い気く地じなし, Futarikiri to ikuji nashi); Chapter 128: An Answer and Smiles (返へん事じとにこにこ, Henji to nikoniko); Chapter 129: Report and Plan (報ほう告こくと計けい画かく, Hōkoku to keikaku)
12	April 18, 2023	978-4-08-892662-9	March 5, 2024	978-1-9747-4364-3
Chapter 130: Bullet Train and Sitting Together (新しん幹かん線せんと隣となりの席せき, Shinkansen to tonari no seki); Chapter 131: Deer and Class Photo (鹿しかと集しゅう合ごう写しゃ真しん, Shika to shūgō shashin?); Chapter 132: Bath and Shampoo (お風ふ呂ろとシャンプー, O furo to shanpū); Chapter 133: Group Activities and The Fushimi Inari Shrine (班はん行こう動どうと伏ふし見み稲いな荷り, Han kōdō to Fushimi inari); Chapter 134: Lost Child and Omokaru Stone (迷まい子ごとおもかる石いし, Maigo to Omokaru ishi?); Chapter 135: Search and Help (捜そう索さくと協きょう力りょく, Sōsaku to kyōryoku); Chapter 136: "Now" and "Again" (「いま」と「また」, 「Ima」to「mata」); Chapter 137: Expectations and Anxieties (期き待たいと不ふ安あん, Kitai to fuan); Chapter 138: Kiyomizu-dera and an Old Couple (清きよ水みず寺でらと老ろう夫ふう婦ふ, Kiyomizu-dera to rōfūfu); Chapter 139: Pounding Heart and Pounding Heart (ドキドキとドキドキ, Dokidoki to dokidoki); Chapter 140: Courage and Timing (勇ゆう気きとタイミング, Yūki to taimingu); Chapter 141: Akina and Saki (明あき菜なさんと沙さ貴きちゃん, Akina-san to Saki-chan); Chapter 142: Words and Trust (言こと葉ばと信しん頼らい, Kotoba to shinrai); Chapter 143: The Day and Classroom (当とう日じつと教きょう室しつ, Tōjitsu to kyōshitsu); Chapter 144: Female Costar and Protagonist (ヒロインと主しゅ人じん公こう, Hiroin to shujinkō)

=== Anime ===
An anime television series adaptation was announced on May 13, 2022. It is produced by Pine Jam and directed by Kazuomi Koga, with scripts written by Yūya Takahashi, characters designed by Yoshiko Saitō, and music composed by Kujira Yumemi. The series aired from January 10 to June 20, 2023, on AT-X and other networks. (Note: After the airing of the third episode, the anime's website announced that the series would be delayed after the sixth episode due to the COVID-19 pandemic, and would be rebroadcast in April, effectively restarting from the first episode.) The opening theme song is "Dramatic Janakutemo" (ドラマチックじゃなくても; "Even Though it's Not Dramatic") performed by Kana Hanazawa, while the ending theme song is "Kasuka de Tashika" (かすかでたしか) by Dialogue+. At Anime NYC 2022, Sentai Filmworks announced that they licensed the series and is streaming it on Hidive. Medialink licensed the series in Asia-Pacific, with Animax Asia to aired the anime in Southeast Asia.

==== Episodes ====
No.	Title	Directed by	Storyboarded by	Original release date
1	"Heroine and Background Character"; Transliteration: "Hiroin Joshi to Mobu Danshi" (Japanese: ヒロイン女子とモブ男子)	Kazuomi Koga	Kazuomi Koga	January 10, 2023
Shiraishi is a teenager with such a low spiritual presence he is practically invisible, has to remind people he exists in case they bump into him while walking and generally accepts he is a background character in his own life story. The only people who can easily see him are his family and his beautiful, popular classmate Kubo. Kubo delights in teasing him but is fascinated by his invisibility and frequently tests just how invisible he can get, even discovering that not one person noticed her sitting on Shiraishi's lap in class. Shiraishi cannot decide if Kubo is a friend, a bully or just using him to amuse herself. Kubo tries to get Shiraishi's phone number but is prevented by her friends interrupting as they didn't see Shiraishi was there. Over the weekend Kubo spots Shiraishi in the park and tries to take a selfie together, but her camera can't recognise his face, so to take the picture she almost has to sit on him again. Afterward she finally gets his phone number. Unused to texting people Shiraishi is surprised when Kubo asks if they can hang out sometime. Kubo's older sister immediately knows Kubo is happy about something.
2	"Bad Luck and Home Visit"; Transliteration: "Hādo Rakku to Jitaku Hōmon" (Japanese: ハードラックと自宅訪問)	Barusa Mikosukun	Kazuomi Koga	January 17, 2023
After gym Kubo gives Shiraishi a scented towel and is secretly thrilled they now smell identical. Shiraishi goes shopping for manga, but the shop's automatic door can't detect him. The passing Kubo thinks his frustration is adorable and opens the door for him. Seeing his favourite manga series Kubo asks if she can borrow them. After fetching them Kubo realises their homes are only five minutes apart and decides to walk to school together. The next morning Kubo's sister, Akina, notices Kubo is wearing perfume, and teases her for having a crush but also wishes her luck. Kubo is mildly disappointed when Shiraishi doesn't notice the perfume. Meeting her friends Hazuki and Tama they don't notice Shiraishi until Kubo points him out. Shiraishi's invisibility causes a car to splash him from a puddle. Needing a shower he returns home but has lost his key so Kubo invites him to shower at her house and borrow her gym tracksuit. Shiraishi awkwardly agrees but Kubo is embarrassed when he sees her bra in the laundry. For his entire walk home Shiraishi is hyper aware he is wearing Kubo's clothes.
3	"The Nobody's Gift"; Transliteration: "Bonja no Okurimono" (Japanese: 凡者の贈り物)	Yurika Fukaya	Yurika Fukaya	January 24, 2023
Kubo learns Shiraishi is only one inch taller than her and teases him that in couples the boy is generally six inches taller. Kubo sees Shiraishi at the park with his much younger brother, Seita. Seita insists they all share a drink, though Kubo notices Shiraishi only pretends to drink and correctly guesses he was embarrassed by the "indirect kiss". Shiraishi wants to buy a manga poster but is embarrassed as the magazine containing the poster has a bikini model on the cover. Akina, an employee, sells it to him but has no idea he is Kubo's friend. Shiraishi is shocked Akina could see him. Akina notices he dropped his student ID and gives it to Kubo to return, commenting that he had bought a magazine of giant breasts. Having medium breasts herself Kubo asks Shiraishi if he prefers large breasts then covers her embarrassment by teasing him. Kubo arranges to spend Christmas Eve with Shiraishi shopping. Upon arriving Kubo reveals she bought him a gift so Shiraishi rushes to buy her one, picking gloves that match her outfit. Kubo is rather embarrassed by what she bought him, a bright yellow "main character" shirt to make him easier to see.
4	"Red Heart and Secret Admirer"; Transliteration: "Akai Hāto to Okurinushi" (Japanese: 赤いハートと送り主)	Yoshinobu Tokumoto	Yoshinobu Tokumoto	January 31, 2023
While playing with Seita Kubo gets a video of Shiraishi acting silly, mortifying him. Shiraishi accidentally wears odd socks to school but only Kubo notices. He in turn notices Kubo is wearing tights. Kubo teases him for staring at her legs. After school Kubo takes him to a store to try a complicated drink, insisting she needs Shiraishi to ensure she doesn't mess up the order. She offers to share the drink but Shiraishi declines due to the "indirect kiss"; instead Kubo deliberately takes a bite of his snack before leaving. Before Shiraishi can decide to accept the new "indirect kiss" someone bumps into him and he drops the snack. Valentine's Day arrives but Shiraishi is unconcerned since girls never remember he exists. However, he discovers a chocolate heart in his desk. His instinct is to assume it was put there by mistake. He briefly wonders if it was Kubo but Kubo claims it was a secret admirer, leaving Shiraishi wondering who it was. In reality Kubo, a notoriously bad cook, had spent all night baking the heart, even asking Akina for help despite knowing Akina would tease her for it. Shiraishi enjoys the heart but is genuinely confused who gave it to him.
5	"White Day and a Destination for Feelings"; Transliteration: "Howaito Dē to Kanjō no Atesaki" (Japanese: ホワイトデーと感情の宛先)	Shintarō Itoga	Kumazō Morino	February 7, 2023
Shiraishi usually eats lunch alone but Kubo joins him. Kubo suggests sharing lunches; Shiraishi avoids her attempt to hand feed him but cannot avoid having to hand feed her, to her obvious delight. She decides next time to cook something special to share with him. Hazuki and Tama are convinced Kubo has a crush on Shiraishi. Tama is disappointed since Shiraishi is so unimpressive but Kubo scolds her since she doesn't know the real Shiraishi behind his invisibility. The two realise the crush might just be full blown love, though Kubo hasn't realised it yet. The next day Shiraishi arrives to school early but finds Kubo still got there first so they share Shiraishi's chair while listening to each other's music. Seeing his obsession with manga Kubo watches Shiraishi's favourite anime movie. Akina is amused, knowing exactly what Kubo is doing and why. White Day arrives so Shiraishi buys chocolates but has no idea who to give them to since his "secret admirer" is still anonymous. He gives them to Kubo to pass on to his admirer, which Kubo teases him for, subtly hinting she is his admirer but also might not be, leaving Shiraishi even more confused than before.
6	"Nurse's Office and Main Character"; Transliteration: "Hokenshitsu to Shujinkō" (Japanese: 保健室と主人公)	Barusa Mikosukun	Yasushi Muroya	February 14, 2023
A young girl spots Shiraishi on the street, shocking him. She turns out to be Akina's cousin Saki, causing Shiraishi to realise that Akina, the shop assistant who sold him the bikini magazine, is Kubo's sister. Akina teases him a little then exchanges numbers. Shiraishi suspects Kubo's ability to see him might be in her family's genetics. Akina returns home with fresh material to tease Kubo with. With exams approaching Shiraishi's mother warns she will confiscate his games if he does badly. Kubo helps him study and turns out to be an excellent tutor. The next day Shiraishi has a fever, though Kubo is the only one to notice his absence. She texts him but Seita gets his phone and sends back an "I miss you" emoji. Shiraishi hurriedly explains so Kubo teases by sending him a "Lonely without you" emoji that she claims Akina sent. The next day Shiraishi is late to school but he meets Kubo in the hallway now with her own fever, so he helps her to the infirmary where she holds his hand until she falls asleep. Shiraishi realises for the first time he actually feels like the main character in his own life story.
7	"Sleepover and Next School Year"; Transliteration: "Otomarikai to Tsugi no Gakunen" (Japanese: お泊まり会と次の学年)	Yū Yabūchi	Katsumi Terahigashi	May 16, 2023
Shiraishi survives his exams thanks to Kubo's tutoring, but as classes will soon be switched as they become second years he and Kubo may no longer be in the same class. As it is raining Kubo manipulates him into sharing an umbrella to see if it makes him visible, though Shiraishi suspects she just wanted to walk together. They are seen by Akina who chooses not to tease Kubo this time. At the weekend Shiraishi spots Saki with heavy shopping and volunteers to help carry it as Saki is cooking dinner for Akina and Kubo. Wanting to know how close they are Saki has Shiraishi say Kubo's first name, Nagisa, and concludes from Kubo's reaction they are more than just classmates. While slacking in class Shiraishi loses the spring from his pen so Kubo deliberately gives him a rabbit toy pen that matches hers, making her smile when he uses it. At a sleepover Kubo, Tama and Hazuki discuss the class switch; if they end up separated they won't get to go on the same class trips or be together at school events, upsetting them. They notice Kubo is also upset at possibly losing Shiraishi.
8	"Picnic and Miscommunication"; Transliteration: "Ohanami to Surechigai" (Japanese: お花見とすれ違い)	Shintarō Itoga	Kazuomi Koga	May 23, 2023
Shiraishi and Seita encounter Kubo, Saki and Akina shopping. Seita is entranced by Saki. After teasing them Akina invites them to a flower viewing picnic the next day. Kubo feels compelled to feed Shiraishi something she made herself. Despite not liking Shiraishi Saki helps her make hamburg steak, since Kubo's cooking is still poisonously inedible. Saki takes over when Kubo cuts her finger but Akina convinces Kubo to learn from the mistake and try again, successfully making the steaks perfectly. At the picnic Seita tries all the food Saki made first. Kubo makes sure Shiraishi gets one of the steaks she made, which he finds delicious, making her happy. Akina quickly gets drunk, teases Shiraishi about marriage, and then pushes her breasts in his face. Kubo furiously leaves. Seita insists Shiraishi fix it so he apologises to her, but she remains upset. Kubo can't understand why she is mad at Shiraishi when it was Akina's fault. She recovers when Seita tells her to fix it and she sees how upset Shiraishi is, so she apologises too. Shiraishi admits Kubo confuses him all the time, making her happy. She then asks him if he would like being in her class next year, surprising him.
9	"New School Year and Class Change"; Transliteration: "Shin Gakki to Kurasugae" (Japanese: 新学期とクラス替え)	Mamoru Kurata	Katsumi Terahigashi	May 30, 2023
Second year begins and Shiraishi finds he and Kubo are once again in the same class and once again sat next to each other, as are Kubo's friends Hazuki and Tamao. Shiraishi finds he is actually looking forward to the coming year. Kubo joins the Environmental Committee with Shiraishi after he reveals he enjoyed people admiring the flowers he grew, even though no one ever saw him tending them. Kubo notices their new classmate Sudo can actually recall being with Shiraishi on Environmental Committee last year, so she arranges for the three of them to be in the same science group. Sudo had actually spent all first year trying to talk to Shiraishi about committee business but never saw him once. Now thanks to Kubo they manage to talk for the first time, which Shiraishi enjoys. He thanks Kubo for her help, flustering her unexpectedly. While walking home Shiraishi confirms that he and Kubo are now friends, annoying her a little that he didn't consider them friends a long time ago.
10	"Comparing Heights and Wall Pin"; Transliteration: "Seikurabe to Kabedon" (Japanese: 背比べと壁ドン)	Hidetoshi Watanabe	Yasushi Muroya	June 6, 2023
Kubo wins a staring contest with Shiraishi and as his forfeit he must greet her first in the morning. After his classmates accidentally cover Shiraishi in chalk dust Kubo brushes it from his hair before pressuring him to reveal he likes girls with ponytails. Kubo notices Shiraishi has grown taller so she insists on comparing their height on a wall. This puts them in a wall slap position, embarrassing him so much he flees. Unknown to Shiraishi Kubo was so flustered she went weak at the knees. The next morning Shiraishi greets Kubo first, making her happy. Before their physical exams Kubo borrows Shiraishi's tracksuit jacket, confusing him, though it turns out to be a trend for girls to wear their boyfriend's jackets. Shiraishi has grown 3cm while Kubo hasn't grown at all. Akina encounters Shiraishi secretly following Seita who is buying eggs as his first errand by himself, reminding her of Kubo's first errand to buy eggs too. When Seita makes it home safely Akina remembers Kubo broke her eggs but stopped crying when Akina stroked her head. She also hints to Shiraishi Kubo still likes having her head stroked and is guaranteed to stop her crying if she's upset.
11	"Movie Theater and Facial Muscles"; Transliteration: "Eigakan to Hyōjōkin" (Japanese: 映画館と表情筋)	Hirofumi Okita	Hirofumi Okita	June 13, 2023
Shiraishi is flummoxed when Kubo asks to see a movie with him, especially when she meets him with her hair in a ponytail. On the overcrowded train they are forced together and Shiraishi is forced into a painful position to avoid touching Kubo whilst being repeatedly hit by people who can't see him. Several guys try to flirt with Kubo, until she grabs Shiraishi and claims he is her boyfriend. Shiraishi notices Kubo holds his arm long after the guys leave. Due to not pre-booking tickets they must wait a few hours to get seats next to each other. At a café Kubo is amazed Shiraishi likes black coffee and stubbornly insists on trying it. When she cannot handle the bitter flavour he remakes it for her with milk and sugar, though he now finds it too sweet. During the movie Kubo notices more emotions on his face than normal. Shiraishi admits he usually hides his expressions from embarrassment, though Kubo still thinks he is easy to read. Walking home together Kubo makes him promise to go other places with her. Shiraishi worries what secret emotions Kubo might already have read on his face.
12	"Starring Role and Gift"; Transliteration: "Shuyaku to Oiwai" (Japanese: 主役とお祝い)	Ryō Takei; Kazuomi Koga	Kazuomi Koga	June 20, 2023
After watching a popular personality test on television Kubo runs the test on Shiraishi and determines he will likely only love one woman his entire life. Shiraishi runs a different test on Kubo revealing she wants lots of children, causing her to leave early from embarrassment. Akina notices Kubo is growing up more everyday and feels nostalgic over her childhood memories. On his birthday, while daydreaming about cake, Shiraishi's stomach growls so loudly the entire class notices him. Amused, Kubo gives him birthday themed chocolate to settle his stomach, amazing him she remembered his birthday was in April. She also gives him a soft toy, so he awkwardly promises to buy her a gift for her birthday in August. That someone actually remembered his birthday makes him so happy he hides his face so she won't see him smiling. Shiraishi starts to really wonder why only Kubo can see him easily. Kubo reminisces she first learned of his invisibility after seeing him in Tama's middle school yearbook, after which she began seeing him all the time and found his invisibility funny. When she was assigned the seat beside him and actually spoke to him his reaction amused her so much she decided to do it every day from then on.

== Reception ==
In 2020, Kubo Won't Let Me Be Invisible was nominated in the sixth Next Manga Awards and placed 19th out of 50 nominees with 9,306 votes. In 2021, the series was again nominated in the seventh Next Manga Awards and placed 7th of 50 nominees.

The anime adaptation received a mixed reception. Cy Catwell of Anime Feminist, reviewing the first episode, compared the series to Komi Can't Communicate and Don't Toy with Me, Miss Nagatoro, saying that Kubo loves teasing Junta as a "form of mild bullying/flirting," noted the tender moments, nice simplicity, and called it cute romance between teenagers at its core, but expressed uneasiness with "Junta's discomfort with Kubo's actions" and did not recommend the series. In contrast, Nicholas Dupree of Anime News Network had a more positive take, reviewing all twelve episodes. He argued that the series does not challenge genre conventions, but is a "quiet comedy built entirely around the dialogue and chemistry of our two leads," with humble and casual ambitions, calling it "pure fluff," sweet, and funny, approaching the "realm of iyashikei in its most atmospheric moments," praised Shiraishi for becoming more relatable, and said the series was charming, craftful, and a "rewarding experience if you can vibe with its mellow energy."

== See also ==
- We're J-Just Childhood Friends, another manga series by the same author
