= We're J-Just Childhood Friends =

Japanese manga series by Nene Yukimori

- First tankōbon volume cover, featuring Yuuichi Momose and Sumi Fujino

おさななななじみ (Osananananajimi)
- Genre: Romantic comedy
- Manga
- Written by: Nene Yukimori
- Published by: Shueisha
- Imprint: Young Jump Comics
- Magazine: Weekly Young Jump
- Original run: July 3, 2025 – present
- Volumes: 3
- icon

We're J-Just Childhood Friends (Japanese: おさななななじみ, Hepburn: Osananananajimi; Childhood Friend) is a Japanese manga series written and illustrated by Nene Yukimori. It has been serialized in Shueisha's seinen manga magazine Weekly Young Jump since July 2025, with its chapters collected in three tankōbon volumes.

== Premise ==
High schoolers Yuuichi Momose and Sumi Fujino have been friends since they were little. Although they are in the same class, they have grown increasingly distant over time, with their interactions becoming infrequent. They would later interact again when Sumi visits the Momose family home for the first time in a long time.

== Characters ==
Yuuichi Momose (百瀬 優一, Momose Yūichi)
Voiced by: Tomohiro Ōno (vomic)
A high school boy who used to be close to Sumi before they grew apart in middle school.
Sumi Fujino (藤野 澄, Fujino Sumi)
Voiced by: Ai Kayano (vomic)
A high school girl who currently lives alone in her apartment and often visits the Momose household.

== Publication ==
Written and illustrated by Nene Yukimori, who previously created the manga series Kubo Won't Let Me Be Invisible from 2019 to 2023, We're J-Just Childhood Friends began serialization in Shueisha's Weekly Young Jump on July 3, 2025. The series' first tankōbon volume was released on December 18, 2025. To promote the series, three voice comics covering the first three chapters, featuring Tomohiro Ōno and Ai Kayano, respectively, voice Yuuichi and Sumi, were posted on the official Young Jump YouTube channel.

The manga's chapters are simultaneously published in English on Shueisha's Manga Plus app.

No.	Release date	ISBN
1	December 18, 2025	978-4-08-893826-4
1. "We're J-Just Childhood Friends" (おさななじみ, Osananajimi); 2. "Lunch Box" (お弁当, Obentō); 3. "A Get-Well Visit" (おみまい, Omimai); 4. "Spoiled Kid" (あまえんぼ, Amaenbo); 5. "Cha-cha-childhood Friends" (おさなななじみ, Osanananajimi); 6. "Sleepover" (おとまり, Otomari); 7. "Scaredy Cat" (こわがり, Kowagari)
2	March 18, 2026	978-4-08-894091-5
3	August 19, 2026	978-4-08-894309-1

== Reception ==
The series was ranked nineteenth in the print category at the twelfth Next Manga Awards in 2026.

== See also ==
- Kubo Won't Let Me Be Invisible, another manga series by the same author
