= List of Goblin Slayer episodes =

Goblin Slayer is an anime television series based on the Japanese dark fantasy light novel series Goblin Slayer written by Kumo Kagyu and illustrated by Noboru Kannatuki. The 12-episode anime television series adaptation by White Fox aired from October 7 to December 30, 2018, (Note: The series premiered on October 6 at 24:30, which is the same as October 7 at 12:30 AM.) and was broadcast on AT-X, Tokyo MX, Sun TV, and BS11. The series is directed by Takaharu Ozaki, with scripts penned by Hideyuki Kurata and Yōsuke Kuroda, character designs handled by Takashi Nagayoshi and music composed by Kenichirō Suehiro. The opening theme is "Rightfully" by Mili, while the ending theme is "Gin no Kisei" (銀の祈誓; "Silver's Oath") by Soraru. Funimation licensed and produced an English dub for the series, with Crunchyroll simulcast the series internationally.

On January 31, 2021, a second season of the anime TV series was announced at GA FES 2021. It is produced by Liden Films and directed by Misato Takada, with Ozaki serving as chief director, and Hiromi Kato designing the characters. Kurata and Suehiro are returning as scriptwriter and composer, respectively. The second season aired from October 6, 2023, to December 22, 2023. The opening theme song is "Entertainment" by Mili, while the ending theme song is "Kasumi no Mukō e" (霞の向こうへ; "To the Other Side of the Mist") by Yuki Nakashima. On October 19, 2023, Crunchyroll announced that the second season will begin airing its dub the following day.

== Series overview ==
Season	Episodes	Originally released	
Season	Episodes	First released	Last released
1	12	October 7, 2018	December 30, 2018
2	12	October 6, 2023	December 22, 2023

== Episodes ==
=== Season 1 (2018) ===
No. overall	No. in season	Title (Note: English translated titles are taken from Crunchyroll.)	Directed by	Written by	Storyboarded by	Original release date
1	1	"The Fate of Particular Adventurers"; Transliteration: "Aru Bōkenshatachi no Ketsumatsu" (Japanese: ある冒険者たちの結末)	Takaharu Ozaki	Hideyuki Kurata	Takaharu Ozaki	October 7, 2018
2	2	"Goblin Slayer"; Transliteration: "Goburin o Korosu Mono" (Japanese: 小鬼を殺す者)	Shūji Miyahara	Yōsuke Kuroda	Takaharu Ozaki	October 14, 2018
3	3	"Unexpected Visitors"; Transliteration: "Omoigakenai Raikyaku" (Japanese: 思いがけない来客)	Kazuomi Koga	Hideyuki Kurata	Kazuomi Koga	October 21, 2018
4	4	"The Strong"; Transliteration: "Tsuyoki Monodomo" (Japanese: 強き者ども)	Masayuki Sakoi	Hideyuki Kurata	Masayuki Sakoi	October 28, 2018
5	5	"Adventures and Daily Life"; Transliteration: "Bōken to Nichijō to" (Japanese: 冒険と日常と)	Kazuomi Koga	Yōsuke Kuroda	Kazuomi Koga	November 4, 2018
6	6	"Goblin Slayer in the Water Town"; Transliteration: "Mizu no Machi no Koonigoroshi" (Japanese: 水の街の小鬼殺し)	Hiroaki Takagi	Yōsuke Kuroda	Hiroaki Takagi	November 11, 2018
7	7	"Onward Unto Death"; Transliteration: "Shi e Susume" (Japanese: 死へ進め)	Takaharu Ozaki	Yōsuke Kuroda	Takaharu Ozaki	November 18, 2018
8	8	"Whispers and Prayers and Chants"; Transliteration: "Sasayaki to Inori to Eishō" (Japanese: 囁きと祈りと詠唱)	Yūsuke Kubo	Hideyuki Kurata	Yūsuke Kubo	November 25, 2018
9	9	"There and Back Again"; Transliteration: "Yukite, Kaerishi" (Japanese: 往きて、還りし)	Haiyūto Michibitsuka	Hideyuki Kurata	Kazuhiro Ozawa	December 2, 2018
10	10	"Dozing"; Transliteration: "Madoromi no Naka de" (Japanese: まどろみの中で)	Shūji Miyahara	Yōsuke Kuroda	Jun Kamiya	December 9, 2018
10.5	10.5	"Adventure Sheet"; Transliteration: "Adobenchā Shīto" (Japanese: 冒険記録用紙(アドベンチャーシート))	N/A	N/A	N/A	December 16, 2018
11	11	"A Gathering of Adventurers"; Transliteration: "Bōkensha no Kyōen" (Japanese: 冒険者の饗宴)	Kenichi Kawamura	Hideyuki Kurata	Kenichi Kawamura	December 23, 2018
12	12	"The Fate of an Adventurer"; Transliteration: "Aru Bōkensha no Ketsumatsu" (Japanese: ある冒険者の結末)	Takaharu Ozaki	Hideyuki Kurata	Takaharu Ozaki	December 30, 2018

=== Season 2 (2023) ===
No. overall	No. in season	Title	Directed by	Storyboarded by	Original release date
13	1	"An Ordinary Spring Day"; Transliteration: "Arifureta Haru no Tsuitachi" (Japanese: ありふれた春の一日)	Misato Takada	Misato Takada	October 6, 2023
14	2	"The Red-Haired Wizard Boy"; Transliteration: "Akage no Shōnen Majutsushi" (Japanese: 赤毛の少年魔術師)	Shunji Yoshida	Misato Takada	October 13, 2023
15	3	"The Training Grounds on the Outskirts of Town"; Transliteration: "Machihazure no Kunrenba" (Japanese: 町外れの訓練場)	Sekijuu Sekino	Jun'ichi Sakata	October 20, 2023
16	4	"Onward to Adventure"; Transliteration: "Soshite Bōken e" (Japanese: そして冒険へ)	Hazuki Mizumoto	Masayoshi Nishida	October 27, 2023
17	5	"Beard-cutter, to the Southern River"; Transliteration: "Kami Kiri Maru, Minami no Kawa e" (Japanese: かみきり丸、南の川へ)	Mitsukuni Samoto	Susumu Nishizawa	November 3, 2023
18	6	"The Elven King's Forest"; Transliteration: "Erufuō no Mori" (Japanese: エルフ王の森)	Yoshitsugu Kimura	Yoshiaki Okumura	November 10, 2023
19	7	"Jungle Cruise"; Transliteration: "Janguru Kurūzu" (Japanese: ジャングル・クルーズ)	Isoroku Koga	Isoroku Koga	November 17, 2023
20	8	"Heart of Darkness"; Transliteration: "Hāto obu Dākunesu" (Japanese: 闇の奥(ハートオブダークネス))	Shunji Yoshida	Jun'ichi Sakata	November 24, 2023
21	9	"Once There Was Youth, Now There Is Nothing but Ash"; Transliteration: "Katsute Atta Seishun, Ima Soko ni Aru Hai" (Japanese: かつてあった青春 今そこにある灰)	Misato Takada, Sekijuu Sekino	Satoshi Shimizu	December 1, 2023
22	10	"City Adventure"; Transliteration: "Shiti Adobenchā" (Japanese: 都邑の冒険(シティ・アドベンチャー))	Daiki Handa	Daiki Handa	December 8, 2023
23	11	"The Princess's Ordeal"; Transliteration: "Ōjo no Junan" (Japanese: 王女の受難)	Mitsukuni Samoto	Yoshiaki Okumura	December 15, 2023
24	12	"O Prayers, Have You Reached Heaven?"; Transliteration: "Inori yo, Ten ni Todoite Iru ka" (Japanese: 祈りよ、天に届いているか)	Yu Harima	Kazuya Sakamoto	December 22, 2023
