= Black-Box (manga) =

Japanese manga series

- First tankōbon volume cover, featuring Ryoga Ishida
- Genre: Sports
- Manga
- Written by: Tsutomu Takahashi
- Published by: Kodansha
- Imprint: Afternoon KC
- Magazine: Monthly Afternoon
- Original run: June 25, 2015 – March 25, 2019
- Volumes: 6
- icon

Black-Box (stylized in all caps) is a Japanese boxing-themed manga series written and illustrated by Tsutomu Takahashi. It was serialized in Kodansha's seinen manga magazine Monthly Afternoon from June 2015 to March 2019, with its chapters collected in six tankōbon volumes.

== Plot ==
Ryoga Ishida is the second son in a family of three. His father, a former boxer, is in prison for murder. His older brother, a fellow boxing aficionado, was recently arrested for a separate murder, this time with Ryoga rumored to be involved as well. Already being branded as part of a "murder family", Ryoga receives letters sent from his father, advising him to follow in his steps to become a world professional boxing champion. Ryoga begins his training at Kuroki's Boxing Gym (クロキボクシングジム), possessing a tough attitude and fighting skills far beyond an average boxer, using his father's teachings to guide him.

His increasing fame and notoriety catches the attention of kickboxing champion, Reon Shidoh, who dismisses Ryoga's talents with him nearby at a sports gala event. Offended by this, Ryoga promptly knocks him unconscious. From there, Reon becomes Ryoga's sworn enemy and switches to fighting as a boxer, determined to take him down at all costs.

== Characters ==
Ryoga Ishida (石田 凌駕, Ishida Ryōga)
A young man whose father and older brother, Shinga, are in prison for murder. He has an affinity for boxing since childhood. He has a tough, bloodthirsty attitude, but harbors deep regret over giving Shinga a traumatic brain injury during a sparring match twelve years ago. He prefers to stay single, even readily admitting to being a virgin.
Rie Kimura (木村 理恵, Kimura Rie)
A reporter for the magazine "Hotshot" (the same magazine appears in the fifteenth volume of Jiraishin (Ice Blade), another manga series by Tsutomu Takahashi). She is assigned to cover Ryoga throughout his training and grows to care for his well-being, despite him being aloof to her presence. Later, she is given new information that the murder Shinga was arrested for may have been Ryoga's doing.
Reon Shidoh (志藤 レオン, Shidō Reon)
A featherweight champion in kickboxing. After he is knocked out in a sports gala by Ryoga, Reon swears to defeat him in a boxing match. He is the same age as Ryoga, and has a girlfriend, Nozomi, who works as an actress.

== Production ==
The inspiration for Black-Box came while author Tsutomu Takahashi was making Sidooh. Takahashi wanted a famous person to write a blurb for one of its volumes; his editor, who was a boxing fan, suggested Hozumi Hasegawa, who agreed to do so. Takahashi met with and later attended Hasegawa's boxing matches. Although he found it hard to watch at first, he eventually came around to it a few years later, around the same time he was making the sequel to Jiraishin (Ice Blade), Jiraishin Diablo. Originally, the story would have been something of a boxing-themed sequel to Diablo, involving a son whose father is a murderer with the character Eriko Aizawa making an appearance. A preview artwork in Diablo's final chapter in good! Afternoon featured Eriko and a boxing glove in November 2011. This idea would lay dormant for the next three years, until Takahashi found a new opportunity to create a new series for Monthly Afternoon and revived it. Eriko was removed from the story altogether, but Takahashi left in hints revealing Black-Box was still in the same universe as Jiraishin.

Takahashi also found inspiration in Ashita no Joe, having first read it back in elementary school. Several scenes in Black-Box were made as homages to the manga series, although a few were only "coincidental" similarities. Takahashi added an author's note at the start of Black-Box's serialization, stating he would "draw this with all [his] respect for 'boxing' and 'Ashita no Joe'."

The title was concocted by mixing box, from the word "boxing", and the color black, for an element of murder. Likewise, for the gym Ryoga attends, Takahashi continued the theme of naming it after the title with "Kuroki" (黒木; 'Black Wood'). It was not until later that Takahashi discovered there was a gym in Ashita no Joe coincidentally named "Shiraki Gym" (白木; 'White Wood').

== Publication ==
Written and illustrated by Tsutomu Takahashi, Black-Box was serialized in Kodansha's seinen manga magazine Monthly Afternoon from June 25, 2015, to March 25, 2019. Kodansha collected its chapters in six tankōbon volumes, released from January 22, 2016, to June 21, 2019.

=== Volumes ===
No.	Release date	ISBN
1	January 22, 2016	978-4-06-388112-7
2	May 23, 2016	978-4-06-388140-0
3	November 22, 2016	978-4-06-388216-2
4	June 23, 2017	978-4-06-388252-0
5	May 23, 2018	978-4-06-511444-5
6	June 21, 2019	978-4-06-516038-1

== Reception ==
Black-Box was one of the Jury Recommended Works at the 21st Japan Media Arts Festival in 2018.
