= List of Jiraishin chapters =

The chapters of the manga series Jiraishin (Japanese: 地雷震; lit. 'Landmine Earthquake') were written and illustrated by Tsutomu Takahashi, and serialized in Kodansha's seinen manga magazine Monthly Afternoon from September 1992 to November 1999. Kodansha compiled its chapters into 19 tankōbon volumes, released from October 23, 1993, to January 21, 2000. The series was republished in a ten-volume bunkoban edition from May 9, 2003, to September 12, 2003, and in a ten-volume shinsōban edition from February 23, 2009, to November 20, 2009. Also included in the first bunkoban and shinsōban volume is a prototype one-shot story titled "The Lost File", published in Kodansha's seinen manga magazine Morning in April 1989.

The North American version of the manga, retitled Ice Blade, was serialized in Tokyopop's MixxZine magazine, but was discontinued after three volumes on May 2, 2005. In France, the manga was licensed by Génération Comics, before it was taken over by Panini Comics; in Italy, by Stars Comics; in Germany, by Carlsen Comics; in South Korea, by Samyang Comics; and in Taiwan, by Tong Li Comics under the Youth Comic series label.

A sequel to Jiraishin, titled Jiraishin Diablo (地雷震 ディアブロ, Jiraishin Diaburo), was serialized in Kodansha's Good! Afternoon magazine from November 2008 to November 2011. Its chapters were compiled in three tankōbon volumes, released from February 5, 2010, to December 7, 2011.

Jiraishin centers on a plainclothes police officer named Kyoya Ida (Ky in the English version), who is known to solve cases by using questionable methods with the point of using violence to resolve them while interacting with a bleak, dark world, sometimes with prices to pay. In Jiraishin Diablo, Ida had left the force for an undetermined period of time while suffering from the effects of Keratoconus after coming across a police detective assigned to Ishikawa and a grown up Aya Koike, who Ida had met back in the 1990s, while solving a case of unknown deaths in the fictional Amakura Island in Japan's Ishikawa Prefecture.

== Volume list ==
=== Jiraishin ===
==== Original volumes ====
No.	Release date	ISBN
1	October 23, 1993	978-4-06-314071-2
File 1: Aoi Umi to Akai Bara (青い海と赤いバラ); File 2: Kashaku (呵責(かしゃく)); File 3: Doll; File 4: Ichi Byō no Nedan (一描(いちびょう)の値段)
2	February 23, 1994	978-4-06-314077-4
File 5: Ji no Shio (地の塩)
3	August 23, 1994	978-4-06-314087-3
File 6: Yamidan (闇弾); File 7: Toki no Kakera (Zenpen) (瞬間(とき)のかけら (前編)); File 7: Toki no Kakera (Kōhen: Oyashirazu) (瞬間(とき)のかけら (後編・親不知(おやしらす))); File 8: Wedding
4	December 17, 1994	978-4-06-314099-6
File 9: Part 1: Yūdō (誘導); Part 2: Shinka (深化); Part 3: Kakusei (覚醒); Part 4: Jōka (浄化)
5	March 23, 1995	978-4-06-314108-5
File 10: Saisen (再戦); File 11: Tenraku (Zenpen) (転落 (前編)); File 11: Tenraku (Kōhen) (転落 (後編)); File 12: Mukō (無効)
6	July 21, 1995	978-4-06-314115-3
File 13: Yuki no Ketsuzoku (雪の血族); Part 1: Purutoniumu (プルトニウム); Part 2: Kunashitō (国無島(くなしとう)); Part 3: Kai (カイ); Part 4: Būdōshinasuchi (Mirai) (Будущность(ブウドウシナスチ) (未来)); Part 5: Umi e...... (海へ......)
7	January 23, 1996	978-4-06-314125-2
File 14: Suriru and Riaru (Zenpen) (スリルandリアル (前編)); File 14: Suriru and Riaru (Kōhen) (スリルandリアル (後編)); File 15: Mainasu 10°C no Shōnin (Zenpen) (−(マイナス)10°Cの証人 (前編)); File 15: Mainasu 10°C no Shōnin (Kōhen) (−(マイナス)10°Cの証人 (後編))
8	June 21, 1996	978-4-06-314133-7
File 16: Part 1: Buta to Ryū (猪(ブタ)(豚)と龍(リュウ)); Part 2: Mato (魔都); Part 3: Chan Fu Mon (張和夢(チャンフモン) (チャンとモン)); Part 4: Shissō (疾走(しっそう))
9	December 17, 1996	978-4-06-314143-6
File 17: Irezumi no Santa Kurōsu (刺青のサンタクロース); Part 1: Māku (印 (マーク)); Part 2: Tattoo (刺青 (tatoo)); Part 3: Fensu (国境 (フェンス)); File 18: 4-gatsu no Chi (4月の血)
10	March 21, 1997	978-4-06-314148-1
File 19: Hush (Momikeshi) (HUSH (もみ消し)); Part 1: Sekinin (責任); Part 2: Shi no Shōnin (死の商人); Part 3: Sei e no Shūchaku (生への執着); Part 4: Dead or Alive
11	August 22, 1997	978-4-06-314161-0
File 20: Mother of Crime; Part 1: The First Line; Part 2: The Cross Line; Part 3: The Junction; Part 4: One Way
12	December 18, 1997	978-4-06-314168-9
File 21: Don't Cry; Part 1: Kiss: Seppun (kiss -接吻-); Part 2: A Cell: Zashikirō (a cell -座敷牢-); Part 3: Cry: Namida (cry -涙-); File 22: Kids
13	March 23, 1998	978-4-06-314172-6
File 23: Focus; Part 1: Hishatai (被写体); Part 2: Firumu (フィルム); Part 3: Purinto (プリント); Part 4: Shattā (シャッター)
14	June 23, 1998	978-4-06-314181-8
File 24: Pātonā (パートナー); Part 1: Tōkyō - Shinjuku (東京・新宿); Part 2: Lin Fei (林(リン)菲(フェイ)); Part 3: Shion Shou (凶(シオン)手(シヨウ)); Part 4: Shiosai (潮騒(しおさい))
15	September 22, 1998	978-4-06-314188-7
File 25: Mukigen Kinchō Jōtai no Jikan (無期限緊張状態の時間); Part 1: Josei A (女性A); Part 2: Gyūnyū (牛乳); Part 3: Kokuin (刻印); Part 4: A・KIRA
16	December 18, 1998	978-4-06-314192-4
File 26: Crash; Part 1: Low; Part 2: Target; Part 3: Set Up; Part 4: Closed
17	July 22, 1999	978-4-06-314212-9
File 27: Shanikusai (謝(しや)肉(にく)祭(さい)); Part 1: Choice; Part 2: Poison; Part 3: Versus; Part 4: Farm
18	January 21, 2000	978-4-06-314227-3
Last File: Life [Part 1]; Part 1: A Bloody Wedding; Part 2: Nōshi (脳死); Part 3: New Heaven
19	January 21, 2000	978-4-06-314228-0
Last File: Life [Part 2]; Part 4: Atsuko (アツコ); Part 5: Father; Part 6: Life

==== Bunkoban volumes ====
No.	Release date	ISBN
1	May 9, 2003	978-4-06-360212-8
2	May 9, 2003	978-4-06-360213-5
3	June 12, 2003	978-4-06-360562-4
4	June 12, 2003	978-4-06-360563-1
5	July 11, 2003	978-4-06-360564-8
6	July 11, 2003	978-4-06-360565-5
7	August 12, 2003	978-4-06-360566-2
8	August 12, 2003	978-4-06-360567-9
9	September 12, 2003	978-4-06-360568-6
10	September 12, 2003	978-4-06-360569-3

==== Shinsōban volumes ====
No.	Release date	ISBN
1	February 23, 2009	978-4-06-314558-8
2	March 23, 2009	978-4-06-314559-5
3	April 23, 2009	978-4-06-314562-5
4	May 22, 2009	978-4-06-314566-3
5	June 23, 2009	978-4-06-314573-1
6	July 23, 2009	978-4-06-314575-5
7	August 21, 2009	978-4-06-314582-3
8	September 23, 2009	978-4-06-314592-2
9	October 23, 2009	978-4-06-310601-5
10	November 20, 2009	978-4-06-310606-0

==== English Tokyopop release ====
No.	Title	Release date	ISBN
1	Puppet	December 15, 1998	978-1-892213-03-7
2	Snow Country	August 16, 1999	978-1-892213-14-3
3	Inducement	February 15, 2000	978-1-892213-19-8

=== Jiraishin Diablo ===
No.	Release date	ISBN
1	February 5, 2010	978-4-06-310623-7
File 1: Lost Island [Part 1] (FILE1: ロスト・アイランド, File 1: Rosuto Airando); Part 1: Eyes; Part 2: Divide; Part 3: Rena's Code; Part 4: Disrespect; Part 5: Friction; Part 6: Explosion
2	December 7, 2010	978-4-06-310714-2
File 1: Lost Island [Part 2] (FILE1: ロスト・アイランド, File 1: Rosuto Airando); Part 7: Eclipse; Part 8: Crystallization; Part 9: Access; Part 10: Destruction; Part 11: Action; Part 12: Emergency; Part 13: Doorway
3	December 7, 2011	978-4-06-387803-5
File 1: Lost Island [Part 3] (FILE1: ロスト・アイランド, File 1: Rosuto Airando); Part 14: Dirty Joint; Part 15: Smash; Part 16: Entrust; Part 17: Fate; Part 18: Pride and Death; Part 19: Diablo......?
