= Sky High =

Sky High or Skyhigh may refer to:

== Film and television ==
- Sky High (1922 film), an American silent film
- Sky High (1951 film), a US Air Force comedy with Sid Melton
- Sky High (1986 film), an American comedy film
- Sky High (2003 film), a supernatural action film
- Sky High (2005 film), an American Disney live-action comedic superhero family film
- Sky High (2020 film), a Spanish crime thriller film
- "Sky High", a season five episode of the TV series Hercules: The Legendary Journeys
- Sky High (TV series), a live-action, supernatural Japanese television drama series

== Music ==
- Sky High!, a 1976 album by American soul/R&B group Tavares
- Sky High, a 2012 album by Mike Posner
- "Sky High" (song), a 1975 single by the band Jigsaw
- "Sky High", a song by Ben Folds Five from their 2012 album The Sound of the Life of the Mind
- "Sky High", a 2015 instrumental by Firebeatz
- Sky High, a 1925 revised version of the musical comedy Whirled into Happiness

== Other ==
- Sky High Aviation Services, an airline based in the Dominican Republic
- Sky High, a 1987–1998 Hardy Boys Casefiles novel
- Skyhigh (manga), a 2003 Japanese manga written by Tsutomu Takahashi
- Sky High (horse) (1957–1973), outstanding Australian Thoroughbred racehorse and sire

== See also ==
- Ski Hi Lee (born 1921), heavyweight professional wrestler
