= Sky High 2 =

Sky High 2 may refer to:

- Season 2 of Sky High (TV series), marketed as Sky High 2
- Sequel to Sky High, 2020 film

== See also ==
- Sky High (disambiguation)
