= Sugihara =

Sugihara (written: 杉原) is a Japanese family name and can refer to:

== People ==
- Aiko Sugihara (born 1999), Japanese female artistic gymnast
- Anri Sugihara (born 1982), Japanese gravure idol
- Chiune Sugihara (1900–1986), Japanese diplomat, credited with saving the lives of some ten thousand Jews during the Holocaust
- George Sugihara (born 1949), professor of biological oceanography
- Kokichi Sugihara (born 1948), Japanese mathematician
- Teruo Sugihara (1937–2011), Japanese professional golfer
- Toshikazu Sugihara (born 1964), Japanese professional golfer
- Yasuhiro Sugihara or Sugizo (born 1969), Japanese musician, singer, songwriter, composer, and record producer

== Other ==
- Sugihara Station
- 25893 Sugihara

== Fictional characters ==
- Sugihara in Go (2001 film)
- Sugihara in Jiraishin
- Makoto Sugihara in The Ancient Dogoo Girl
