= List of Parasyte volumes =

First tankōbon volume cover, published by Kodansha on July 23, 1990

The chapters of the Parasyte manga series were written and illustrated by Hitoshi Iwaaki. The manga was first published for three chapters in the special issue of Kodansha's Morning, Morning Open Zōkan, from the F to H issues (August 1 to October 3, 1989 (Note: Issue H was released two weeks before, on September 19, 1989.) issues). The series was later transferred to the publisher's Monthly Afternoon on November 25, 1989, (Note: It resumed in the magazine's January 1990 issue, published on November 25, 1989.) and finished on December 24, 1994. (Note: It finished in the magazine's February 1995 issue, released on December 24, 1994.) Its chapters were collected into ten tankōbon volumes by Kodansha, and was later republished in eight kanzenban volumes.

It was originally licensed for English translation and North American distribution by Tokyopop, which published the series over 12 volumes. The Tokyopop version ran in MixxZine. Daily pages from the Tokyopop version ran in the Japanimation Station, a service accessible to users of America Online. The Tokyopop English-language manga went out of print on May 2, 2005. Del Rey Manga later acquired the rights to the series, and published eight volumes following the kanzenban release. Kodansha USA later republished the volumes in North America between 2011 and 2012.

Two tribute manga volumes (Neo Parasyte m and Neo Parasyte f) collecting short stories by various authors were published in 2015 and 2016 (2016 and 2017 in English).

== Original Japanese tankōbon release ==
No.	Japanese release date	Japanese ISBN
1	July 23, 1990	978-4-06-314026-2
1. "Invasion" (侵入, Shinnyū); 2. "Wild Animal" (野獣, Yajū); 3. "Contact" (接触, Sesshoku); 4. "Killer's Aura" (殺気, Sakki); 5. "Studyholic" (勉強好き, Benkyōzuki); 6. "Tamiya Ryōko" (田宮良子, Tamiya Ryōko); 7. "Attack" (襲撃, Shūgeki)
2	January 23, 1991	978-4-06-314029-3
8. "Species" (種 (しゅ), Shu); 9. "Mother" (母親, Hahaoya); 10. "Concern" (こだわり, Kodawari); 11. "Farewell" (別れ, Wakare); 12. "Hole in Chest" (胸の穴, Mune no Ana); 13. "Absent Tears" (出ない涙, Denai Namida); 14. "Friends" (仲間, Nakama)
3	July 23, 1991	978-4-06-314036-1
15. "The Missing 30%" (消えた30%, Kieta 30%); 16. "Journey's End" (旅の終わり, Tabi no Owari); 17. "Transformation" (変貌, Henbō); 18. "Human" (人間, Ningen); 19. "Shimada Hideo" (島田秀雄, Shimada Hideo); 20. "Signs" (兆し, Kizashi)
4	January 23, 1992	978-4-06-314040-8
21. "Observation" (観察, Kansatsu); 22. "Fissure" (亀裂, Kiretsu); 23. "Confusion and Slaughter" (混乱と殺戮, Konran to Satsuriku); 24. "One Blow" (一撃, Ichigeki); 25. "Ripples" (波紋, Hamon); 26. "A Girl's Dream" (少女の夢, Shōjo no Yume)
5	August 22, 1992	978-4-06-314045-3
27. "Maneuvers" (演習, Enshū); 28. "A Calm Day" (平和な日, Heiwana Hi); 29. "Kana" (加奈, Kana); 30. "Power" (超能力, Chōnōryoku); 31. "Red Tears" (赤い涙, Akai Namida); 32. "Tamura Reiko" (田村玲子, Tamura Reiko)
6	January 23, 1993	978-4-06-314054-5
33. "Witness" (目撃者, Mokugeki-sha); 34. "Iron and Glass" (鉄とガラス, Tetsu to Garasu); 35. "Indifferently Named" (名前に無頓着, Namae ni Mutonjaku); 36. "The Devil's Face" (悪魔の面影, Akuma no Omokage); 37. "Dining Room" (食堂, Shokudō); 38. "Face-Off" (敵対, Tekitai)
7	July 23, 1993	978-4-06-314064-4
39. "Assassin" (刺客, Shikaku); 40. "Command Tower" (司令塔, Shireitō); 41. "Final Form" (完全体, Kanzentai); 42. "A Little Family 1" (小さな家族 (1), Chiisana Kazoku (1)); 43. "A Little Family 2" (小さな家族 (2), Chiisana Kazoku (2)); 44. "Impetuosity" (性急に, Seikyū ni); 45. "Cold-Blooded Battle" (冷血の戦い, Reiketsu no Tatakai)
8	February 23, 1994	978-4-06-314076-7
46. "The Park" (となり町の公園, Tonarimachi no Kōen); 47. "Some Child's Parent" (人の子の親, Hitonoko no Oya); 48. "Homecoming" (ただいま, Tadaima); 49. "Staring Experiment" (お見合い実験, Omiai Jikken); 50. "Weapon" (凶器, Kyōki); 51. "Bearing" (針路, Shinro)
9	November 22, 1994	978-4-06-314095-8
52. "Surrounded" (包囲, Hōi); 53. "Fuse" (口火, Kuchibi); 54. "Pacification" (制圧, Seiatsu); 55. "Parasyte" (寄生獣, Kiseijū); 56. "Head" (首, Kubi); 57. "Hero" (ヒーロー, Hīrō); 58. "Migi" (ミギー, Migī)
10	March 23, 1995	978-4-06-314107-8
59. "Old Woman" (老婆, Rōba); 60. "Resolve" (覚悟, Kakugo); 61. "Sinister Form" (異形, Igyō); 62. "Morning" (朝, Asa); 63. "Return to Normal" (日常の中へ, Nichijō no Naka e); 64. "You" (きみ, Kimi)

== English Tokyopop release ==
No.	English release date	English ISBN
1	June 23, 1998	1-892213-02-8
2	March 23, 1999	1-892213-07-9
3	October 26, 1999	1-892213-21-4
4	June 21, 2000	1-892213-44-3
5	October 23, 2000	1-892213-53-2
6	March 19, 2001	1-892213-67-2
7	June 12, 2001	1-892213-71-0
8	November 20, 2001	1-892213-86-9
9	January 15, 2002	1-931514-09-7
10	May 21, 2002	1-931514-10-0
11	September 24, 2002	1-931514-11-9
12	November 19, 2002	1-931514-12-7

== Kanzenban edition ==
No.	Original release date	Original ISBN	English release date	English ISBN
1	January 23, 2003	978-4-06-334664-0	May 1, 2007 (Del Rey Manga); July 26, 2011 (Kodansha USA)	978-0-345-49624-9 (Del Rey Manga); 978-1-61262-073-2 (Kodansha USA)
2	January 23, 2003	978-4-06-334665-7	October 30, 2007 (Del Rey Manga); July 26, 2011 (Kodansha USA)	978-0-345-49681-2 (Del Rey Manga); 978-1-61262-074-9 (Kodansha USA)
3	February 21, 2003	978-4-06-334680-0	May 13, 2008 (Del Rey Manga); July 26, 2011 (Kodansha USA)	978-0-345-49825-0 (Del Rey Manga); 978-1-61262-075-6 (Kodansha USA)
4	February 21, 2003	978-4-06-334681-7	July 29, 2008 (Del Rey Manga); July 26, 2011 (Kodansha USA)	978-0-345-49826-7 (Del Rey Manga); 978-1-61262-076-3 (Kodansha USA)
5	March 17, 2003	978-4-06-334692-3	October 28, 2008 (Del Rey Manga); August 21, 2012 (Kodansha USA)	978-0-345-50033-5 (Del Rey Manga); 978-1-61262-310-8 (Kodansha USA)
6	April 23, 2003	978-4-06-334697-8	January 27, 2009 (Del Rey Manga); August 21, 2012 (Kodansha USA)	978-0-345-50034-2 (Del Rey Manga); 978-1-61262-311-5 (Kodansha USA)
7	May 23, 2003	978-4-06-334722-7	April 28, 2009 (Del Rey Manga); January 31, 2013 (Kodansha USA)	978-0-345-50035-9 (Del Rey Manga); 978-1-61262-341-2 (Kodansha USA)
8	June 23, 2003	978-4-06-334734-0	July 28, 2009 (Del Rey Manga); August 21, 2012 (Kodansha USA)	978-0-345-50036-6 (Del Rey Manga); 978-1-61262-312-2 (Kodansha USA)

== Parasyte Reversi ==
A spin-off manga, titled Parasyte Reversi (寄生獣リバーシ, Kiseijū Ribāshi), started on Kodansha's Comic Days app on March 2, 2018. It was written and illustrated by Moare Ohta. The series finished on May 7, 2021, and was collected into eight volumes. Kodansha publishes the series in English on its K Manga digital service. Kodansha USA has licensed the manga for digital release and the first volume was released on October 8, 2024.

No.	Original release date	Original ISBN	English release date	English ISBN
1	August 8, 2018	978-4-06-512428-4	October 8, 2024	978-1-68491-501-9
1. "The Boy Returns" (そこに還る少年, Soko ni Kaeru Shōnen); 2. "Sredni Vashtar" (スレドニ・ヴァシュター, Suredoni Vashutā); 3. "Diablo" (ディアブロ, Diaburo); 4. "Diablo II" (ディアブロ II, Diaburo II); 5. "Diablo III" (ディアブロ III, Diaburo III); 6. "Signs" (兆し, Kizashi); 7. "The Work Begins" (始業, Shigyō); 8. "Happy!!"
2	February 13, 2019	978-4-06-514541-8	November 19, 2024	979-8-88933-466-8
9. "Afterglow" (残照, Zanshō); 10. "The Parasite Tree" (寄生木, Yadorigi); 11. "Summer Love, Awakening" (夏恋、覚醒, Natsu Koi, Kakusei); 12. "Summer Love, Awakening II" (夏恋、覚醒 II, Natsu Koi, Kakusei II); 13. "Detective" (刑事, Keiji); 14. "Encounter" (邂逅, Kaigō); 15. "Anabaptism" (アナバプティスト, Anabaputisuto); 16. "Anabaptism II" (アナバプティスト II, Anabaputisuto II); 17. "The Demons' Hour" (逢魔時, Ōmagatoki); 18. "Erlkönig"
3	September 11, 2019	978-4-06-516973-5	February 11, 2025	979-8-88933-467-5
19. "Contact" (接触, Sesshoku); 20. "Contact II" (接触 II, Sesshoku II); 21. "The Eaters" (もの食う生物, Mono Kū Seibutsu); 22. "Understanding" (疎通, Sotsū); 23. "Powerless" (無能, Munō); 24. "Powerless II" (無能 II, Munō II); 25. "Crossing" (雑踏, Zattō); 26. "Experiment" (実験, Jikken); 27. "Pursuit" (追跡, Tsuiseki); 28. "Modern Love"
4	February 12, 2020	978-4-06-518541-4	April 29, 2025	979-8-88933-660-0
29. "In Case of the Right Leg" (右脚の場合, Migi Ashi no Bāi); 30. "Cannibal" (共食い, Tomogui); 31. "Promise" (約束, Yakusoku); 32. "Papaoutai"; 33. "Papaoutai II"; 34. "Atyanta" (畢竟(ひっきょう), Hikkyō); 35. "It Doesn't Matter, Does It?" (関係ないね, Kankeinai ne); 36. "Observation" (観察, Kansatsu); 37. "Tunnel Vision" (中て弓, Ate Yumi); Bonus Chapter: "The Psychic 'Fukami-san'" (超能力者「深見さん」, Chō Nōryoku-sha 'Fukami-san')
5	July 8, 2020	978-4-06-520121-3	June 17, 2025	979-8-88933-661-7
38. "Weakling" (弱虫, Yowamushi); 39. "Praying-Mantis" (カマハン, Kamahan); 40. "Friends" (仲間, Nakama); 41. "So Close at Hand…" (こんなに近くで…, Konnani Chikaku de…); 42. "Your Name" (君の名は, Kimi no Na wa); 43. "Mixed-Up Confusion"; 44. "How Many Nocturnal Animals?" (夜行性の生き物何匹?, Yakō-sei no Ikimono Nanbiki?); 45. "Cecile Cut Blues" (セシルカットブルース, Seshiru Katto Burūsu); 46. "Beginning" (始動, Shidō); 47. "Consultation" (相談, Sōdan)
6	December 9, 2020	978-4-06-521729-0	January 6, 2026	979-8-88933-662-4
48. "The Plastic Flower Laughs" (造花が笑う, Zōka ga Warau); 49. "The Plastic Flower Laughs II" (造花が笑う II, Zōka ga Warau II); 50. "Confession" (告白, Kokuhaku); 51. "Performance" (奏で, Kanade); 52. "Beautiful Name" (美しい名前, Utsukushī Namae); 53. "Decision" (決断, Ketsudan); 54. "Revelation" (啓示, Keiji); 55. "Revelation II" (啓示 II, Keiji II); 56. "My Name is Noda" (野田と申します, Noda to Mōshimasu); 57. "Communication Breakdance" (コミュニケーション・ブレイクダンス, Komyunikēshon Bureikudansu)
7	May 12, 2021	978-4-06-523223-1	July 7, 2026	979-8-89478-242-3
58. "Curtain Up" (開幕, Kaimaku); 59. "Face / Off" (フェイス/オフ, Feisu/Ofu); 60. "What Day's the Final Battle?" (決戦は何曜日?, Kessen wa Nani Yōbi?); 61. "Surrounded" (包囲, Hōi); 62. "Spark" (口火, Kuchibi); 63. "Spark II" (口火 II, Kuchibi II); 64. "Suppression" (制圧, Seiatsu); 65. "Suppression II" (制圧 II, Seiatsu II); 66. "Sredni Vashtar II" (スレドニ・ヴァシュター II, Suredoni Vashutā II); Bonus: Hidariude no Bāi (Tadashi Futekigō) (左腕の場合 (ただし不適合))
8	July 14, 2021	978-4-06-524051-9	September 8, 2026	979-8-89478-243-0
67. "Sredni Vashtar III" (スレドニ・ヴァシュター III, Suredoni Vashutā III); 68. "All the Young Ones" (若者のすべて, Wakamono no Subete); 69. "Jive My Revolver"; 70. "Green Green" (グリーングリーン, Gurīn Gurīn); 71. "World's End Supernova" (ワールズエンド・スーパーノヴァ, Wāruzuendo Sūpānova); 72. "Eventually Becoming Noda" (やがて野田になる, Yagate Noda ni Naru); 73. "Homecoming" (帰宅, Kitaku); 74. "Thought" (思考, Shikō); 75. "The Everyday" (日常, Nichijō); 76. "The Boy Returns" (そこに還る少年, Soko ni Kaeru Shōnen)
