= Kyōya =

Kyōya may refer to:

== People ==
Given name

- Kyoya Honda (本田 響矢; born 1999), Japanese actor and model
- Kyoya Yamada (山田 恭也; born 2001), Japanese former footballer

Surname

- Kazuyuki Kyoya (京谷 和幸; born 1971), Japanese former football player and wheelchair basketball player
- Yoshiaki Kyoya (京谷 佳明; born 1951), Japanese former ice hockey player

== Fictional characters ==
- Kyouya Hashiba, the main character of Remake Our Life!
- Kyoya Hibari a character in Reborn!
- Kyoya Ida, the main character of Ice Blade (Jiraishin): see List of Ice Blade characters
- Kyohya Minabe, a character in Heaven's Gate
- Kyoya Ootori, a character in Ouran High School Host Club
