= Sky High (2003 film) =

2003 film by Ryuhei Kitamura

- Directed by: Ryuhei Kitamura
- Screenplay by: Isao Kiriyama
- Based on: Skyhigh by Tsutomu Takahashi
- Starring: Yumiko Shaku; Takao Osawa; Shosuke Tanihara; Eihi Shiina; Kanae Uotani
- Music by: Nobuhiko Morino
- Distributed by: Amuse Inc.
- Release date: November 8, 2003
- Running time: 122 minutes
- Country: Japan
- Language: Japanese

Sky High (スカイハイ; also known as Skyhigh) is a Japanese supernatural action film from director Ryuhei Kitamura. It is based on the manga of the same title by Tsutomu Takahashi and serves as a prequel to a Japanese television drama of the same name, and starring the same actress, Yumiko Shaku.

Although the film is a prequel to the series, the film was made while the series was still in production, sometime between the first and second seasons. The film had a clear effect on the direction of the second season, as evidenced in the look and style of Mina/Izuko's second season costuming—more similar to the darker, edgier look she sports in the film, as opposed to the softer, colourful, kimono-like outfit of the first season. The film reveals how the somewhat meek Mina became the heroic Izuko, as seen in the series (and the film's action climax).

== Plot ==
A serial killer is on the loose who just so happens to also be removing the hearts of his victims and taking them with him. His victims however, are not merely random humans as thought by the police. They are in fact, the past and present guardians of the gateway of the afterlife.

On the day he is to be married, Detective Kanzaki, who happens to be on the case, discovers that his fiancé Mina has been murdered with her heart also missing. He also learns that the killers are Kudo, a geneticist, and his evil secretary Rei. The two are trying to obtain six hearts from the guardians so that they may call forth a horde of demons from the Gate of Rage and have their every desire granted. Only problem is, once they open the gate the entire world will be covered in darkness.

Meanwhile, in the afterlife, Mina encounters Izuko, the Guardian of the Gate. Izuko gives her three options: Mina can choose to ascend to heaven and be reborn, she can choose to forever walk the earth as a ghost or she can choose to curse one of the living to death and as a result be cursed to descend to hell. Mina has 12 days to make her choice.

== Production ==
The film opened in Japanese theaters in 2003. Its premiere followed in the footsteps of the popular Sky High television series, starring the same actress (Yumiko Shaku) in the lead role of Izuko—or specifically, the "new" Izuko, as the film is considered a prequel to the TV series, revealing how Mina Saeki (Shaku) came to replace the previous Guardian and take her position as the Izuko we see in the series. Although the film makes much greater use of action, martial arts, and big budget special effects than the series is capable, both follow the same continuity. TV-Asahi, the Japanese television network behind the TV series is also the theatrical film's primary production company. The movie was helmed by popular action director Ryuhei Kitamura, best known for his Versus series of films, as well as other popular draws such as Azumi and Godzilla: Final Wars. Kitamura also directed several episodes of the TV series, and following the film's box office success, Sky High 2 (or Season 2) was quickly put into production by the network for January 2004, utilizing many elements from the film, including its darker, edgier look, and improved sets and effects.

The film's screenplay was written by Isao Kiriyama, based on the manga Sky High by Tsutomu Takahashi.

The closing theme for the movie is "Horizon" by Hyde (L'Arc-en-Ciel and Vamps).
