= NeuN (manga) =

Japanese manga series

- Cover of the first tankōbon volume
- Manga
- Written by: Tsutomu Takahashi
- Published by: Kodansha
- Magazine: Weekly Young Magazine
- Original run: May 22, 2017 – February 3, 2020
- Volumes: 6
- icon

NeuN is a Japanese manga series written and illustrated by Tsutomu Takahashi. It was serialized in Kodansha's seinen manga magazine Weekly Young Magazine from May 2017 to February 2020, with its chapters collected in six tankōbon volumes.

== Synopsis ==
In 1940, SS members visit Brausteppe, a small village in southern Germany, and order the villagers to submit their residential files. However, the purpose of the visit was to kill all residents who had seen Franz Neun and his face. Thirteen children were artificially created to inherit Hitler's DNA, but twelve, including Neun, were deemed unnecessary. SS member Theo Becker, who was on the mission to escort Neun, goes against Major General Clausen, who was in charge of the raid, and blows up other members to carry out the initial mission of protecting Neun. After shooting Major General Clausen, Theo takes Neun with him on a journey to escape the Nazis.

== Characters ==
=== Main ===
Franz Neun (フランツ・ノイン, Furantsu Noin)
A boy with the surname number 9 who lived in Blausteppe. He has the synchronous ability to brainwash and take in his opponents. He reads the murdered Acht's desire to live and decides to defeat Sechs.
Berner Acht (ベルナー・アハト, Berunā Ahato)
Surname number 8 who lived in Spreerügen. He committed suicide after meeting Sechs.
Georg Sechs (ゲオルク・ゼクス, Georuku Zekusu)
A bespectacled boy with the surname number 6. Head of the Hitler Youth Empire. He received his doctorate in quantum mechanics at the age of 12. Two years before meeting Neun, he caused 56 villagers to commit suicide. He went to Berlin by himself and convinced Goebbels and Himmler to issue an order to kill all of the children other than himself. He appears to be the only "completed race" (synchronized human, "synchronizater") among the thirteen.
Rebecca Elf (レベッカ・エルフ, Rebekka Erufu)
Surname number 11; girl with black hair. She hates the Nazis who burned her village and wants revenge. She left Germany for Warsaw, joining the Straw Bullet, after which she murdered a traitor. Neun calls her a "liar".
Goddess (女神, Megami)
Mother of the thirteen children. She is a "chosen race" above Hitler.

=== Supporting ===
==== Vant ====
Theo Becker (テオ・ベッカー, Teo Bekkā)
Wall number 9. Born in 1910. He was ordered to protect Neun, and when the SS attacked, chose to protect him.
Naomi Reisinger (ナオミ・ライジンガー, Naomi Reishingā)
Wall number 8. Female warrior who wields a katana. Like Theo, she chose to protect Acht. After Acht's death, she sees worth in Neun and protects him with Theo.
Gunther (ギュンター, Gyuntā)
Wall number 11. He was murdered after leaving all of his photographs with Rebecca and leaving a will to rely on Straw Bullet. Kugel is an old acquaintance of his.

==== Nazis ====
Heinrich Himmler
Chief of the SS. In response to Sechs' proposal, he ordered the execution of Operation 12Feld to purge children who inherited Hitler's blood.
Gerd Clausen (ゲルト・クラウゼン, Geruto Kurauzen)
Major General who led the assault on Brausteppe, but is killed by Theo.
Joseph Goebbels
Nazi Propaganda Minister.
Adolf Hitler
President of Nazi Germany.
Ulrich Neustaedter (ウルリッヒ・ノイシュテッター, Ururihhi Noishutettā)
SS medical director called "Dr. U". After the 13-year-old Theo created an opportunity for him to join the Nazis, he created the 13 children through in vitro fertilization.
Gerhard Besch (ゲルハルト・ベッシュ, Geruharuto Besshu)
Private.
Jimson Gavius (ジムゾン・ガビウス, Jimuzon Gabiusu)
Major General. Ruled over the city of Spreerügen until he was executed by Dr. U.
Oskar Dirlewanger
SS Colonel. Head of the Stenvice Forced Labor Camp. He is a sadist and leads an army of criminals. Shot dead by Theo.

==== Straw Bullet ====
Kugel (クーゲル, Kūgeru)
Real name unknown. Leader of the Polish resistance organization Straw Bullet.
Jacek Kaminski (ヤツェク・カミンスキ, Yatsekku Kaminsuki)
Nazi spy. Infiltrated Straw Bullet to collect information on the underground organizations of Poland but was executed by Rebecca.

==== Other ====
Eva Braun
Hitler's mistress. Met Sechs at a party in Berlin.
Karl Baumann (カール・バウマン, Kāru Bauman)
Doctor sent to the monitoring facility where Neun is housed. An alcoholic.
Berger (ベルガー, Berugā)
Senior doctor at the monitoring facility where Neun is housed.

== Publication ==
Written and illustrated by Tsutomu Takahashi, NeuN was first published as a three-one-shot chapter story in Kodansha's seinen manga magazine Weekly Young Magazine from January 16 to April 17, 2017. It was later published as a full-fledged series in the same magazine, on a monthly basis, from May 22, 2017, to February 3, 2020. Kodansha collected its chapters in six tankōbon volumes, released from September 6, 2019, to February 6, 2020.

=== Volumes ===
| No. | Japanese release date | Japanese ISBN |
|---|---|---|
| 1 | September 6, 2017 | 978-4-06-510175-9 |
| 2 | February 6, 2018 | 978-4-06-510907-6 |
| 3 | September 6, 2018 | 978-4-06-512757-5 |
| 4 | March 6, 2019 | 978-4-06-514511-1 |
| 5 | September 6, 2019 | 978-4-06-516981-0 |
| 6 | February 6, 2020 | 978-4-06-518485-1 |
