= Zankyō (manga) =

Japanese manga series

- First tankōbon volume cover

残響
- Genre: Drama; Psychological suspense
- Manga
- Written by: Tsutomu Takahashi
- Published by: Shogakukan
- Magazine: Big Comic Superior
- Original run: May 8, 2015 – October 14, 2016
- Volumes: 3

Zankyō (Japanese: 残響; lit. 'Reverberation') is a Japanese manga series written illustrated by Tsutomu Takahashi. It was serialized in Shogakukan's seinen manga magazine Big Comic Superior from May 2015 to October 2016, with its chapters collected in three tankōbon volumes.

== Publication ==
Zankyō, written and illustrated by Tsutomu Takahashi, was serialized in Shogakukan's seinen manga magazine Big Comic Superior from May 8, 2015, to October 14, 2016. Shogakukan collected its chapters in three tankōbon volumes, released in October 2015, May 2016 and January 2017 respectively. The manga is licensed in France by Pika, in Spain by Norma Editorial, and in Italy by Dynit Manga.

=== Volumes ===
No.	Japanese release date	Japanese ISBN
1	October 30, 2015	978-4-09-187295-1
2	May 23, 2016	978-4-09-187674-4
3	January 30, 2017	978-4-09-189455-7
