= Jumbo Max =

Japanese manga series

- First tankōbon volume cover
- Genre: Crime
- Manga
- Written by: Tsutomu Takahashi
- Published by: Shogakukan
- Magazine: Big Comic
- Original run: April 25, 2020 – present
- Volumes: 17
- icon

Jumbo Max (stylized in all caps) is a Japanese manga series written and illustrated by Tsutomu Takahashi. It has been serialized in Shogakukan's seinen manga magazine Big Comic since April 2020.

== Publication ==
Written and illustrated by Tsutomu Takahashi, Jumbo Max started in Shogakukan's seinen manga magazine Big Comic on April 25, 2020. Shogakukan has collected its chapters into individual tankōbon volumes. The first volume was released on November 30, 2020. As of October 30, 2026, seventeen volumes have been released.

=== Volumes ===
No.	Release date	ISBN
1	November 30, 2020	978-4-09-860762-4
2	March 30, 2021	978-4-09-861005-1
3	July 30, 2021	978-4-09-861114-0
4	November 30, 2021	978-4-09-861196-6
5	March 30, 2022	978-4-09-861266-6
6	July 29, 2022	978-4-09-861389-2
7	December 28, 2022	978-4-09-861495-0
8	April 28, 2023	978-4-09-861698-5
9	September 28, 2023	978-4-09-862530-7
10	February 29, 2024	978-4-09-862715-8
11	June 28, 2024	978-4-09-862784-4
12	November 28, 2024	978-4-09-863108-7
13	March 28, 2025	978-4-09-863108-7
14	August 29, 2025	978-4-09-863541-2
15	January 30, 2026	978-4-09-863770-6
16	May 29, 2026	978-4-09-864017-1
17	October 30, 2026	978-4-09-864155-0

== Reception ==
The series was nominated for the 71st Shogakukan Manga Award in 2025.
