= Hito Hitori Futari =

Japanese manga series

- First tankōbon volume cover

ヒトヒトリフタリ
- Genre: Supernatural
- Manga
- Written by: Tsutomu Takahashi
- Published by: Shueisha
- Imprint: Young Jump Comics
- Magazine: Weekly Young Jump
- Original run: November 2, 2011 – August 1, 2013
- Volumes: 8
- icon

Hito Hitori Futari (Japanese: ヒトヒトリフタリ; lit. 'One Person as Two') is a Japanese manga series written and illustrated by Tsutomu Takahashi. It was serialized in Shueisha's seinen manga magazine Weekly Young Jump from November 2011 to August 2013, with its chapters collected in eight tankōbon volumes.

== Plot ==
Hito Hitori Futari follows the story of the Japanese Prime Minister, Kasuga Soichiro, and his guardian spirit, Riyon, as they struggle to survive in the world of Japanese politics.

== Publication ==
Written and illustrated by Tsutomu Takahashi, Hito Hitori Futari was serialized in Shueisha's seinen manga magazine Weekly Young Jump from November 2, 2011, to August 1, 2013. Shueisha collected its chapters in eight tankōbon volumes, released from February 17, 2012, to September 19, 2013.

The manga was licensed in France by Panini.

=== Volumes ===
No.	Japanese release date	Japanese ISBN
1	February 17, 2012	978-4-08-879283-5
2	May 18, 2012	978-4-08-879334-4
3	August 17, 2012	978-4-08-879391-7
4	November 19, 2012	978-4-08-879458-7
5	January 18, 2013	978-4-08-879496-9
6	April 19, 2013	978-4-08-879595-9
7	July 19, 2013	978-4-08-879608-6
8	September 19, 2013	978-4-08-879666-6
