= Sky High (TV series) =

- スカイハイ
- Based on: Skyhigh by Tsutomu Takahashi
- Starring: Yumiko Shaku
- Country of origin: Japan
- Original language: Japanese
- No. of episodes: 19 (list of episodes)

Production
- Running time: 60 min. each

Original release
- Network: TV-Asahi
- Release: January 17, 2003 – March 19, 2004

Related
- Sky High (2003 theatrical film) (prequel)

Sky High (スカイハイ, Sukai Hai) (also known as Skyhigh) is a live-action, supernatural Japanese television drama series, starring actress and model, Yumiko Shaku. It aired in Japan, first run, from 2003 to 2004, and was popular enough to spawn the 2003 feature film of the same name (produced while the series was still in production and starring the same actress). Both are based on the Japanese manga, Skyhigh. Shaku stars as Izuko, the Guardian of the Gate to the afterlife.

The basic premise, the protagonist must use her powers to guide the dead on their journey to the afterlife by helping them determine the meaning or circumstance of their death. However, in Izuko's case, no matter how hard she tries, her guidance does not always result in a happy ending.

== Plot ==
Izuko (Yumiko Shaku) is a beautiful and mysterious gatekeeper to the afterlife. Known as the Guardian of the Gate, Izuko guides spirits of the recently departed on their journey...sometimes to Heaven, other times to Hell. The decision is theirs and it is not always an easy one. Often the spirit is the victim of a murder or other untimely death. In such case, a soul is offered three options: 1) accept their death as it is and proceed into Heaven to await reincarnation. 2) Wander the Earth as a ghost. 3) Take justice into their own hands and face the gates of Hell. Most episodes (see Episode List below) involve the guest starring character seeking to discover what happened to them and why—with Izuko attempting to guide them on the correct path. To her sadness and despite her compassion, Izuko does not always succeed and the moral dilemma is often very grey and unfair.

We discover in the big budget prequel (theatrical) film shot between Seasons 1 and 2, Sky High (2003 film) Izuko once faced this same decision herself. In life, her name was Mina...murdered by a supernatural serial killer. In the movie, Mina takes the place of the previous Guardian, killed by a demon. Mina is then unwittingly thrust into the role she plays in the TV series as Izuko, Guardian of the Gate—responsible for guiding the dead to sometimes happy and sometimes heart breaking ends.

== Production ==
Sky High premiered on the Japanese television network, TV-Asahi, on January 17, 2003. The series starred popular Japanese actress and supermodel Yumiko Shaku, also known internationally for her starring role as action heroine JXSDF Lt. Akane Yashiro in two subsequent Godzilla movies, Godzilla Against Mechagodzilla (2002) and Godzilla: Tokyo S.O.S. (2003). Sky High Season 1 (Series 1) ran for ten episodes, ending with a three-part thriller featuring special guest star Yamada Maiko.

Season 2 (marketed as Sky High 2) premiered on TV-Asahi on Friday, January 16, 2004, following the theatrical release of the big budget motion picture Sky High—a prequel to the TV series, and also starring Yumiko Shaku in a big screen reprise of her TV series role. The second TV season of Sky High picks up on a number of elements from the big screen venture, including a darker, edgier look to Shaku's costuming in contrast to the softer, more colorful look of the first season. The ninth episode of Season 2, titled "Fate," served as the series finale.

== List of Sky High Episodes ==
No.	Title	Original release date
1.01	"First One Down: "Steal Her""	17 January 2003
Yumiko Shaku stars as Izuko, a beautiful and mysterious Guardian of the Gate to the afterlife. Her role is to guide the dead with three choices. 1) Accept death as it is and proceed to Heaven. 2) Not accept their death and continue wandering the earth as a ghost. 3) Undo a wrong or curse done unto you, but face the consequences. Her first visitor is a young woman, Sekikawa Noriko (Kimi Yoshi Yoshino), whose body was found along a river under suspicious circumstances. Izuko allows Noriko to investigate the circumstances of her death. What Noriko discovers is shocking. Guest Stars: Kimi Yoshi Yoshino, Sakai Masato, Yuka Itaya More. Director: Nakahara Takashi.
1.02	"Part Two Outs: "Connection""	24 January 2003
Izuko must help a young woman found murdered in the trunk of a car determine what happened. Guest Stars: Saki Kagami, Morimoto Ryouzi More. Director: Nakahara Takashi
1.03	"The Third Death: "Hero""	31 January 2003
Izuko is presented with the irony of a man who died a hero, saving the life a woman attacked by thugs. The irony is that he was in the right place at the right time only because he is a voyeur--and now Izuko must help him deal with the emotional turmoil of his own sins. Guest Stars: Okada Yoshinori, Suzuki 砂羽 More. Director: Asou Manabu.
1.04	"The Fourth Death: "Reversal""	7 February 2003
An exchange student is the victim of bullying. Izuko must convince her not to seek revenge. Guest Stars: Niiyama Tiharu, Tanaka Tie. Director: Asou Manabu
1.05	"The Fifth Death: "Room 503""	14 February 2003
Izuko finds herself helping Valentine's Day lovers find happiness in the face of tragedy. Guest Stars: 也実 Arimori, Kondou Yoshimasa More. Director: Tsuruta Norio
1.06	"The Sixth Death: "Pigeon House""	21 February 2003
Izuko encounters a businessman who dies in the midst of a sex worker scandal rocking his company. Guest Stars: Leo Morimoto, Mirai Yamamoto More. Director: Shinohara Tetsuo
1.07	"Seventh Dead: "A Song""	28 February 2003
An aspiring rock star who dies has one final song to sing. Guest Stars: Toba Zyun, Suzuki Kazuma. Director: Shinohara Tetsuo
1.08	"The Eighth Death: "Face, Part 1""	7 March 2003
Izuko helps Anna (Yamada Maiko) find answers in the midst of a treacherous and dangerous intrigue involving a headless corpse. (Part 1 of 3) Director: Takatsu Takakazu.
1.09	"The First Close: "Face Novella""	14 March 2003
In the build up to the season finale, Izuko becomes overwhelmed by Anna's plight as DNA proves Anna's true parentage. (Part 2 of 3) Guest Star: Yamada Maiko. Directed by: Ryuhei Kitamura, Takatsu Takakazu
1.10	"The Tenth Death: "Face, Part II" - Season Finale"	21 March 2003
The trilogy whodunit concludes with Izuko and Anna discovering a shocking truth behind Anna's murder in the pages of a cryptic novel. (Part 3 of 3) Guest Stars: Yamada Maiko, Shiro Sano, Akiyoshi Kumiko, and Mamoru Ren. Director: Ryuhei Kitamura

No.	Title	Original release date
Prequel	"Sky High (2003 film) (Theatrical Motion Picture)"	8 November 2003
Mina (Yumiko Shaku) is a beautiful bride-to-be when she becomes the victim of a grotesque series of supernatural killings—her heart cut right out of her chest. As her distraught groom, a Tokyo cop, vengefully attempts to find her killer, Mina finds herself in an underworld of spirits and demons. Guided by Izuko, Guardian of the Gate to the afterlife, she is presented three choices on how to proceed. However, her path takes an entirely unexpected journey when Izuko is defeated by a demon in a katana-wielding duel to the death. In her dying breath, Izuko bequeaths Mina the Sword of the Guardian of the Gate. Soon, Mina is forced to face her demonic killer in battle. Defeating him, she becomes the new Izuko, Guardian of the Gate—just as we see her in the TV series. [Movie is Rated R (US) for violence, gore, and coarse language.]

No.	Title	Original release date
2.01	"Wish Upon a Star ( 星に願いを )"	17 January 2004
When a family is ripped apart by a fatal drunk driving crash, Izuko (Yumiko Shaku) must help them come to terms with what has happened—and the afterlife that awaits them.
2.02	"Baroque ( バロック )"	2004
Actress Kaori Akira Takashi meets Izuko, Guardian of the Gate, having died after a two year comma. Kaori had been at the height of her career when she fell from a building during a rehearsal. Now, a rival actress revels in the spotlight which should have been hers.
2.03	"Dreams ( 夢 )"	2004
Izuko helps an Olympic hopeful, killed in a fire, aid the success and encouragement of another athlete injured in that same fire.
2.04	"Judgment ( ジャッジメント )"	2004
Criminal defense attorney Asakura Iori is fighting to prove her client's innocence of murder, when she, herself, is stabbed to death outside the courthouse. With Izuko's help, Iori must now solve the crime from beyond the grave—all while dealing with her own desire for vengeance…and risk facing the gates of Hell.
2.05	"Last Love ( 最後の恋 )"	2004
At the Gates, Izuko encounters Rie, a murdered housewife perplexed by her death and the suspicious state of her marriage—leaving Rie to contemplate a vengeful murder of her own. Can Izuko stop her from making the wrong decision?
2.06	"Fist ( 拳 )"	2004
Izuko offers a dead boxer a second chance at winning the Sendo Champion title.
2.07	"Time Capsule ( タイムカプセル )"	2004
Izuko helps Maruka, a troubled teenaged soul, investigate her own death, after her body is discovered buried in a junior high school time capsule after twenty-one years. Was it an accident or murder?
2.08	"Prophesy ( 予言 )"	2004
While guarding the Gate to the afterlife, Izuko is puzzled by the untimely arrival of a psychic woman…who isn't dead yet.
2.09	"Fate ( 宿命 ) – Series Finale"	2004
A teenaged woman, Sora, is murdered during a home invasion, along with her parents. Izuko faces one of her toughest decisions in guiding this lost girl, cut down in her prime.
