= Yumiko Shaku =

Japanese actress and model

- 釈由美子
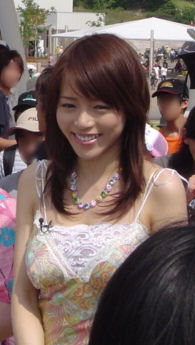
- Yumiko Shaku at Expo in 2005
- Born: Yumiko Shaku; June 12, 1978 (age 48); Kiyose, Tokyo, Japan
- Occupations: Model; actress
- Years active: 1997–present
- Modeling information
- Height: 1.64 m (5 ft 5 in)
- Eye color: Dark Brown
- Agency: Tommy's Artist Company
- Website: http://www.tommys.co.jp/profile/s_yumiko.htm

Yumiko Shaku (釈由美子, Shaku Yumiko; born June 12, 1978, in Tokyo) is a Japanese actress, model and former gravure idol. She is represented by Tommy's Artist Company.

== Filmography ==
=== Television ===
Year	Title	Role	Notes	Ref.
2003	Sky High	Izuko	Lead role	
2005	Dangerous Beauty	Saori Kitamura		
2007	Himitsu no Hanazono	Kayo Tsukiyama	Lead role	
2023	Fermat's Cuisine	Sakura Akamatsu		

=== Film ===
Year	Title	Role	Notes	Ref.
2001	The Princess Blade	Yuki	Lead role	
2002	Godzilla Against Mechagodzilla	Akane Yashiro	Lead role	
2003	Godzilla: Tokyo S.O.S.	Akane Yashiro		
2025	Hello, My Friend	Hitomi Motokura		

=== Video games ===
Year	Title	Role	Notes	Ref.
2005	Perfect Dark Zero	Joanna Dark		

== Bibliography ==
- Shaku Beauty (2009) (Publisher: Wani Books; ISBN 978-4-8470-1818-3)
- Shaku Beauty-Style (2010) (Publisher: Gakken Publishing; ISBN 978-4-05-404632-0)
- I am (2012) (Publisher: Gakken Publishing; ISBN 978-4-05-405386-1)
- Shaku Body (2013) (Publisher: Gakken Publishing; ISBN 978-4-05-800191-2)
