= Sidooh =

Japanese manga series

- First tankōbon volume cover

SIDOOH―士道― (Sidōh)
- Genre: Chanbara; Historical
- Manga
- Written by: Tsutomu Takahashi
- Published by: Shueisha
- Imprint: Young Jump Comics
- Magazine: Weekly Young Jump
- Original run: March 3, 2005 – October 28, 2010
- Volumes: 25
- Manga

Sidooh: Sunrise
- Written by: Tsutomu Takahashi
- Published by: Shueisha
- Imprint: Young Jump Comics
- Magazine: Weekly Young Jump
- Original run: March 17, 2011 – May 12, 2011
- Volumes: 1

Sidooh (Japanese: SIDOOH―士道―, Hepburn: Sidōh) is a Japanese manga series written and illustrated by Tsutomu Takahashi. It was serialized in Shueisha's seinen manga magazine Weekly Young Jump from March 2005 to October 2010, with its chapters collected in 25 tankōbon volumes.

== Premise ==
Mid-nineteenth century in Japan. A woman dies in the cholera epidemic that is ravaging the country. She leaves two young children to fend for themselves: Shotaro, 14 years old and Gentaro, 10 years old. According to the last recommendations from their mother, they know that to survive, they will have to become strong because the weak are doomed to die. They then set out in search of a master who will teach them how to wield the sword to become like their late father, samurai. These innocent orphans are far from imagining how merciless the world around them can be towards those who do not know how to defend themselves.

== Publication ==
Tsutomu Takahashi first published a one-shot of Sidooh in Shueisha's seinen manga magazine Weekly Young Jump on January 6, 2005; (Note: The one-shot was released in the No. 6-7th issue of 2005 (cover date January 29, 2005), which was released on January 6.) it began its regular serialization in the same magazine two months later on March 3. (Note: It started in the magazine's No. 14th issue of 2005 (cover date March 17, 2005), which was released on March 3.) The manga finished serialization in the magazine on October 28, 2010. (Note: It ended in the magazine's No. 48th issue of 2010 (cover date November 11, 2010), which was released on October 28.) Shueisha collected its chapters in 25 tankōbon volumes, released from June 17, 2005, to April 19, 2011. Shueisha released the digital version of all 25 volumes on May 17, 2013.

In France and Italy, the manga is licensed by Panini. in France, Panini published 14 volumes of the manga from 2007 to 2014, and in 2021 they republished all 25 volumes in a new edition. in Spain licensed by Glénat Éditions.

A spin-off titled Sidooh: Sunrise (Note: Japanese: 士道 サンライズ, 士道Sunrise) was serialized in the same magazine Weekly Young Jump from March 17, 2011, to May 12, 2011. Kodansha collected its chapters in a single volume, published on May 19, 2011.

=== Volumes ===
No.	Release date	ISBN
1	June 17, 2005	978-4-08876-812-0
2	September 16, 2005	978-4-08876-853-3
3	December 19, 2005	978-4-08876-895-3
4	March 17, 2006	978-4-08877-046-8
5	June 19, 2006	978-4-08877-096-3
6	September 19, 2006	978-4-08877-142-7
7	November 17, 2006	978-4-08877-168-7
8	February 19, 2007	978-4-08877-218-9
9	May 18, 2007	978-4-08877-261-5
10	August 17, 2007	978-4-08877-310-0
11	November 19, 2007	978-4-08877-350-6
12	February 19, 2008	978-4-08877-393-3
13	May 19, 2008	978-4-08877-440-4
14	August 19, 2008	978-4-08877-490-9
15	November 19, 2008	978-4-08877-545-6
16	February 19, 2009	978-4-08877-596-8
17	May 19, 2009	978-4-08877-646-0
18	August 19, 2009	978-4-08877-699-6
19	November 19, 2009	978-4-08877-756-6
20	February 19, 2010	978-4-08877-810-5
21	June 18, 2010	978-4-08877-888-4
22	August 19, 2010	978-4-08879-014-5
23	November 19, 2010	978-4-08879-054-1
24	March 18, 2011	978-4-08879-093-0
25	April 19, 2011	978-4-08879-094-7

== Reception ==
In November 2012, Sidooh manga ranked forty-six on AnimeClick's website's poll of top 70 "The best 2000s seinen" with 8,100 votes. Reviewing the first volume, Manga Sanctuary praised the story and art, and described realism and the main characters as one of the strengths of the manga, stating "Sidooh is not conventional either in terms of design or scenario. It's dark, mysterious, disturbing and sometimes unhealthy." Writing for IGN France, Damien Hilaire likened Sidooh to Blade of the Immortal with its violent content, adding: "The layout is sublime, the emotion is transmitted without dialogue, a play of looks... This economy of words is reminiscent of the cinema from which Takahashi's cutting is greatly inspired."

Manga News wrote: "The first volume of Sidooh is a slap in the face, in that Takahashi perfectly establishes, from the outset, a particularly dark and uncompromising atmosphere, which he then refines throughout the pages." Nicolas Demay of Planete BD described Sidooh as an uncompromising manga, considering it similar to the works of Vagabond, Blade of the Immortal and Berserk, stating "The series is served by a very inky, black drawing, sticking very well to the atmosphere that emerges from the reading, where everything is shown without artifice, further accentuating the violent side of the action scenes. All this makes Sidooh a real visual slap in the face." Takahashi's artwork has been particularly praised by critics. In the review of the first and twenty-fifth volumes, fellow Planete BD reviewer Faustine Lillaz gave a "very good" grade to the drawings, and she calls the story of the first volume a good foundation for the sequel and describes the final volume as a well-managed finale. hk01-com said that the manga has a unique style of drawing and is a classic samurai realistic comic, adding: "the painting style of Sidooh vaguely feels a bit like Vagabond, but it is a little different."
