= Skyhigh (manga) =

Japanese manga series

- Cover of the first manga volume

スカイハイ (Sukai Hai)
- Genre: Paranormal; Suspense
- Manga
- Written by: Tsutomu Takahashi
- Published by: Shueisha
- Magazine: Weekly Young Jump
- Original run: March 22, 2001 – April 11, 2002
- Volumes: 2
- Manga

Skyhigh: Karma
- Written by: Tsutomu Takahashi
- Published by: Shueisha
- Magazine: Weekly Young Jump
- Original run: January 23, 2003 – June 26, 2003
- Volumes: 2
- Manga

Skyhigh: Shinshō
- Written by: Tsutomu Takahashi
- Published by: Shueisha
- Magazine: Weekly Young Jump
- Original run: August 7, 2003 – November 11, 2004
- Volumes: 4
- Manga

Tenmasō no Sanshimai – Sky High
- Written by: Tsutomu Takahashi
- Published by: Shueisha
- Magazine: Grand Jump
- Original run: August 21, 2013 – September 3, 2014
- Volumes: 4
- Live-action film

Tenmasō no Sanshimai – Sky High
- Directed by: Ryuhei Kitamura
- Written by: Ureha Shimada
- Music by: Akihiko Matsumoto
- Studio: Toei Company
- Released: October 28, 2022
- Live-action
- 2003–2004 TV series; 2003 film

Skyhigh (Japanese: スカイハイ, Hepburn: Sukai Hai) is a Japanese manga series written and illustrated by Tsutomu Takahashi. It was serialized in Shueisha's seinen manga magazine Weekly Young Jump from 2001 to 2002. It was followed by two sequels; Skyhigh: Karma (2003) and Skyhigh: Shinshō (2003–2004). A fourth series, Tenmasō no Sanshimai – Sky High, was serialized in Grand Jump from 2013 to 2014.

Skyghigh follows the story of Izuko, a mysterious "Guardian of the Gate" to the Afterlife. Izuku guides troubled souls who pass through, presenting them with three choices: to ascend to Heaven to await reincarnation; to deny their death and wander the earth as a ghost, or to seek vengeance upon the person who caused their death or suffering—but the consequences of that, no matter how justified, is to be condemned to Hell.

The series spawned a television drama adaptation which was broadcast on TV Asahi from 2003 to 2004 and a live-action film released in 2003. A live-action film adaptation of Tenmasō no Sanshimai – Sky High premiered in Japanese theaters in 2022.

== Plot ==
Izuko is a mysterious gatekeeper to the afterlife. Known as the "Guardian of the Gate", Izuko guides spirits of the recently departed on their journey, sometimes to Heaven, other times to Hell. The decision is theirs and it is not always an easy one. Often the spirit is the victim of a murder or other untimely death. In such case, a soul is offered three options: accept their death as it is and proceed into Heaven to await reincarnation; wander the Earth as a ghost; take justice into their own hands and face the gates of Hell. Most stories involve characters seeking to discover what happened to them and why—with Izuko attempting to guide them on the correct path.

== Media ==
=== Manga ===
Written and illustrated by Tsutomu Takahashi, Skyhigh was serialized in Shueisha's seinen manga magazine Weekly Young Jump from March 22, 2001, (Note: It started in the 16th issue of 2001, released on March 22 of the same year.) to April 11, 2002. Shueisha collected its chapters in two tankōbon volumes, released on December 10, 2001, and May 17, 2002. A second series, Skyhigh: Karma (スカイハイ カルマ), was serialized in Weekly Young Jump from January 23 to June 26, 2003. Its chapters were collected in two tankōbon volumes, released on May 19 and August 19, 2003. A third series, Skyhigh: Shinshō (スカイハイ 新章), was serialized in Weekly Young Jump from August 7, 2003, to November 11, 2004. Its chapters were collected in four tankōbon volumes, released from December 18, 2003, to January 19, 2005. Both sequels were published while the series was in production and at the height of its popularity.

Another series, Tenmasō no Sanshimai – Sky High (天間荘の三姉妹 スカイハイ) was serialized in Shueisha's Grand Jump magazine from August 21, 2013, to September 3, 2014. Its chapters were collected in four tankōbon volumes, released from February 19 to October 17, 2014.

=== Drama ===
A television drama adaptation was broadcast on TV Asahi from 2003 to 2004.

=== Live-action films ===
A live-action film premiered on November 8, 2003.

A live-action film adaptation of Tenmasō no Sanshimai – Sky High premiered in Japanese theaters on October 28, 2022. The film was directed by Ryuhei Kitamura, with scripts by Ureha Shimada and music composition by Akihiko Matsumoto.
