= List of Ice Blade characters =

The following are the characters that have appeared in the Ice Blade (Jiraishin) manga.

== Characters ==
=== Main characters ===
- Kyoya Ida (飯田 響也, Ida Kyōya) / Ky

A renegade detective who prefers to solve cases by using his Glock 17 pistol. Can speak fluent English and German to some degree. There is no indication about his mother, nor what happened to her after his father's suicide. Ever since his father's death, he became cold and emotionless to most people, except to Eriko, Hachimaki, Yukari and Director Narita.
A Tokyopop page described him as "a cold and stylish cop with the attitude of a modern-day Steve McQueen." Another page from the same company described him as "A modern-day James Bond". Yet another stated that he had the "panache" of Bond along with "a Dirty Harry attitude" although that he is actually "a lonely cop pushed to the edge."

- Tsuyoshi Yamaki (八巻 剛志, Yamaki Tsuyoshi) / Mack

Kyoya's first partner, he is described by Tokyopop as "Friendly and outgoing" and someone who "wears his heart on his sleeve". His nickname in Japanese versions is Hachimaki.
He is later shot to death by an armed Chinese juvenile delinquent. After he dies, he leaves behind his wife, Yukari, and his son is named after him in memory.

- Director Narita (成田, Narita) / Nader

Kyoya's superior officer at the Shinjuku Police precinct and head of the station's homicide division. He was pals with Kyoya's late father. During a trip in New York after his retirement from the force, he was nearly killed when Lisa Lewis tried to gun him down.
In the end, he is shot and killed by Kei Amami, who had received a heart transplant from his daughter Atsuko Narita, because she was having a conflict with Atsuko's personality.

- Eriko Aizawa (相沢 江理子, Aizawa Eriko)

Kyoya's second partner. Her husband, Kohei Asada, was shot to death by her stalker right after the wedding ceremony. Speaks fluent English, Mandarin Chinese, and Spanish aside from her native Japanese. Her family owns a dog named Puck.
She appears to be fond of Kyoya for solving cases, even though he uses lethal force as a solution.

=== Shinjuku police officers ===
- Kawamura/Murdoch

A detective who led Endo and Yanagi to Sugita's detention cell.

- Kishikawa

A homicide detective with a tall height; had investigated with Kyoya and Hachimaki regarding the case of a lost police revolver and the accidental murder of an armed robber.

- Oda

A detective in the homicide division. Was responsible for arresting two foreigners in the local park, but was wounded in the hospital when one of them struck his head with a flower pot.

=== Other police officers ===
- Hans Mayer

A German national in the CID (Criminal Investigation Division) with the rank of Inspector, was under the payroll of Alexander von der Hünen, providing information on the movement of Kyoya while he was in Germany. Was crippled in the end after Kyoya shot him in the leg. Had warned the Japanese detective that another Der Kalte will rise from the depths of the German underworld.
Has a 14-year-old daughter, who is a drug addict (unseen character).

- Shingo Nakashima

A uniformed policeman and partner of Kimura, he was one of the conspirators who teamed up with Detective Kirishima in catching Yoshiaki Saito in the act of attempted murder against Dr. Yoshida and was earlier stabbed by Saito. Later on, he was stabbed to death by the same man, but not before he scarred his face with a knife and took his revolver.

- Aoki

An investigator of the Female A murder case. Was seen to be psychologically affected by the suspect due to her age.

- Endo/Endler

An officer from the National Police Agency's International Crimes Division. He is a Japanese of African-American descent. He was later killed by a Russian gangster in Kunashi Island.
He sacrificed his life in order to save Nina when he was shot in the chest by a Russian mobster. He was later shot by Kyoya in retaliation.

- Hamaguchi

Colleague of a police officer named Suzuki. Was stationed at the South Nakazaki Police Station.

- Ito

A female officer. Burning with rage over her friend's brutal assassination, who was also a cop, she assisted Kyoya in capturing Lin Fei in the Shinjuku District Central Park.

- Kaneko

A homicide detective, was investigating the suspicious deaths of swindlers. Was almost killed by a sniper. Kyoya played his game by shooting some parts of the chair with his pistol before the rope "tried" to take over him. Using this tactic, he was able to determine the sniper's position and shot him in the head.

- Kimura

Partner of Shingo, he also teamed up with Kirishima in arresting Yoshiaki Saito. Overwhelmed with excessive guilt, he chooses to commit suicide by jumping from the roof of his apartment building.

- Kirishima

A police detective, he was the mastermind of capturing Yoshiaki Saito after he punched his ex-wife, Kaori, in a drunken state. He later had sex with Kaori after gunning down Yoshiaki, but not before he was shot in the head with Nakashima's stolen police revolver.

- Lu

Chief of the People's Armed Police (PAP) detachment in Shanghai. Was instructed by Li to shoot and kill everyone inside his property (e.g. mansion).

- Sakamoto

Partner of Kaneko, was killed by a mysterious sniper in a local warehouse.

- Sano

Local officer stationed at the Nishiochiai Police Station. Had leaked info to Saiki by accident and was captured by Sugihara's henchmen in order to lure Saiki to him.

- Suzuki

Officer stationed at the South Nakazaki Police Precient. Went mad after realizing that his son, Akira, was Murderer A. He was shot by Iida when he tried to draw his revolver and shoot a local drunk kid whom he mistook for his son.

- Yanagi

Partner of Endo at the National Police Agency's International Crimes Division. Was shot to death alongside Yasuyuki Sugita at the Shinjuku Police station underground parking lot.

=== Allies ===
- Krab/Klauf

A Russian man who came to Kunashi Island with his sister, Nina. His origins are unknown, but the island soon became his new home. Had killed Sugita in the Shinjuku Police station parking lot and was wounded by Endo/Endler while he was trying to escape. He later joined forces with him, Kyoya and Kai to eliminate the Russian Mafia presence near Kunashi Island. Speaks fluent Japanese during his stay in the island with Nina.
He served as the bodyguard to the three dissident Russian nuclear scientists. One of them was named Viktor.
Committed suicide when he drove a boat full of gunpowder into a Russian Mafia ship, which was possibly a decommissioned cruiser.

- Nina

Came with Krab/Klauf, her brother, to Kunashi Island years ago. Like him, she was not sure of their true origins, indicating that they were orphaned at a young age. Tried to escape with Sugita to Tokyo, but was captured by her brother. She had despised him for his actions, but had no choice but to let it slide as Krab/Klauf was her only brother.
Assisted Kyoya by being the Russian interpreter to the Russian Mafia during a "supposed" exchange between Kai and the Russian Mafia leader. She was about to be killed by a Russian mobster if Endo/Endler did not intervene. It's not known on what happened to Nina after Japanese Ground Self-Defense Forces (JGSDF) soldiers had raided the island.

- Pit

A German street worker, aided Kyoya during his investigation in Hamburg by offering him shelter. Became angry with him after discovering the deaths of Fanske and Roxy. Had warned Kyoya not to set foot in Germany.

- Sagawa/Sage

A police informant and a personal ally of Endo/Endler, he arranged the trip for Kyoya, Endo and himself to Kunashi Island. Was killed in a crossfire between Endo and Krab/Klauf.

- Stefan aka Fanske

A German man who aids Kyoya in his investigation in Germany. Was killed by German mobsters.

- Katsumi "Kai" Kitano

Head of the village on Kunashi Island. Was tasked by his Uncle Kim to protect three dissident Russian nuclear scientists and a neutron bomb, (for later sale to the North Koreans) by the Russian mafia. Father was an ex-Japanese Imperial Army soldier and mother was the daughter of the village chief. Speaks fluent Russian, along with his native Japanese. Had ordered the assassination of Yasuyuki Sugita for leaving Kunashi Island with fissile material and the knowledge of the neutron bomb.
Was shot by Russian mob boss on his ship, off the coast of Kunashi. After three gunshot wounds to the chest and a massive amount of blood loss, Kai drowned of his own free will.

=== Civilians ===
- Dr. Nakahara

Doctor of a local police hospital who treated Kyoya's hypnotism spell after being exposed to a subliminal video at a local hospital. He later moved to New York in order to move on with his practice and brought his family there also.

- Dive D

A foreign rock star. His concert was to be used as a staging ground for a massacre via subliminal music notes, courtesy of Senshu Shinomi.

- Gu

Illegal immigrant from Taiwan, had an affair with Lin Lin before fleeing back to Keelling in Taiwan. Was shot in the cheek by Fan Tianmin as a means of exacting revenge.

- Hidemi

Former wife of Ishida, who went psychotic after his company collapsed. Married ex-officer Yamagata, bringing her daughter Akari into his family.

- Ishida

Was suspected by Yamagata of trying to ruin his family. In reality, he collaborated with Kazumi Okino is order to ruin Yamagata's life, which began to seed guilt into his conscience.

- Jun

Former boyfriend of Saki. Andrew Johnson had him killed after he made Saki disclose her location to him.

- Kojima

Manager of actress Rena Matsubara. Had alerted Kyoya and Hachimaki over Nao's mysterious death.

- Kumiko

Farm hand and helper to Ozaki's farmhouse and a member of the Equal Rights Party.

- Moriyama

Magazine journalist. Tried to pry information of her friend, Aoki, regarding any info on Female A. Had possibly undergone PTSD (Post Traumatic Stress Disorder) after seeing Akira Suzuki mortally injure one of her colleagues.

- Ran

Daughter of parents who own a laundry service. Her parents were responsible for murdering another girl who had competition with her after appearing in a TV commercial years ago.

- Saki

Former friend of Mami Nagai, believed to be a target of Andrew Johnson until she escaped with Takako.
Was accidentally responsible for disclosing her location to her ex-boyfriend Jun, who was killed by Andrew as well.

- Shimamoto

Butler of the Akashi family, told Kyoya about Senshu's family history in order to help him be at ease with the death of his late parents.

- Takagi

Owner of a local bar. Was indirectly responsible for Hachimaki's death when he asked for his help in getting a drunk out his establishment, where the killing of Wang Kefan took place.

- Takako

Former friend of Mami Nagai, was targeted by Andrew Johnson.

- Xu

Contact between Fan's Taiwan Mafia cell and the local geomancers, had advised Lin Fei that Lin Lin's corpse may be buried in Japan if her relatives do not claim the body.

- Jiro Akashi

Brother-in-law of Junko Shinomi. Senshu used hypnotism to let Jiro kill himself by slicing his right hand off, which did not solve Senshu's delusions.

- Harumi (Sato) Fujita

Twin sister of Natsumi, was manipulated to come to Germany with Alexander after he "killed" her first unborn child since she was 7 months pregnant. At the end, she was pregnant with Alexander's child. Her husband died in Hamburg of a supposed "heart attack".

- Hirokazu Goto

Associate of Naoki Tsukamoto, was questioned by Kyoya over his disappearance after his release from jail.

- Kyosuke Kitano/Tan

Father of Katsumi "Kai" Kitano, was a former infantry soldier of the Imperial Japanese Army. Settled into Kunashi Island after he felt that the Japanese government would not accept them back into society. He and his fellow Japanese POWs have decided to live in the island and integrate into their village. His father was Japanese and his mother was Korean.

- Dr. Yoko Kiyama

A police specialist. Aided Kyoya and Hachimaki with her knowledge of the human subconsciousness and modern hypnotism.

- Aya Koike (小池 彩, Koike Aya)

Friend of Takashi Koike. Had manipulated her father to kill his ex-mom and his supposed stepfather. Was responsible for pressuring Takashi to commit suicide. Met Iida again to provide information about Mie Tada (Tae Sato), aka Female A, who was responsible for murdering Naomi Sato by explaining details on her life.

- Asato Kurata

Single mother to Asami, had requested protection for her daughter after finding out that someone wanted to kill Asami, due to a TV competition show.

- Mami Nagai

Former Korean High student, was bullied due to her father's job as a tattoo artist. Andrew Johnson, her friend, retaliated for her by killing her bullies.

- Atsuko Narita

Only daughter of Director Narita. Was supposed to marry Hajime Ninomiya, due broke off due to his involvement in a criminal matter.
Like her father, she too was shot and killed near the end of the manga when a deranged stalker of Eriko shoots her in the head, making her brain dead. She was a teacher at a local cram school.

- Tomonori Ozaki

Convicted of killing a known rapist, he established the Equal Rights Party, a fictional political party made up of ex-prisoners. He died after being shot by the rapist's mother during a hostage negotiation. Was a member of the Equal Rights Party.

- Shoko Sawano

Younger sister of Akiko Sawano.

- Yusuke Shina

Student of Atsuko. Was under the custody of Narita after his mother, Tatsuko Shina, went missing. Has stomach ulcer for being under pressure of doing well for his parents.

- Yasuharu Tajima

Supposedly an ex-Triad goon, he decided to reform himself by working on the farms of Tomonaru Ozaki.

- Hidemi Yamagata

Mother of Kayo and her adopted daughter, Akari. Teamed up with Kyoya in order to rescue Kayo from Kazumi in Niigata. She raised the two daughter after Yamagata was arrested by police and Kyoya.

- Yukari Yamaki

Wife of Hachimaki. She became a widow after he was killed in the line of duty. Took Kyoya's suggestion to name her only son after Hachimaki.

=== Criminals/Suspects ===
- Kei Amami

Female assassin who was tasked to kill a Pure Wind cult leader in police custody. Had received a heart transplant from the late Atsuko Narita, thus having some of her memories. Assassinated ex-Director Narita and wanted to kill Kyoya in order to end her nonstop dreams involving Atsuko and Kyoya. Iida shot her instead, pissed that she was using psychological guilt to make him guilty for not trying hard enough to save Atsuko.

- Fan Tianmin

Leader of a local Taiwanese mafia cell back in Taiwan. Had used Eriko's life as a means of bargaining for Lin Fei's life. During the exchange, Eriko drew Lin Fei away in order to Kyoya to shoot him after he raised his revolver.

- Kiyoshi Hatano

Convicted for murdering a restaurant owner, had killed three of his police escorts when Akiko Sawano and her boyfriend crashing into a Kanagawa Police car. Akiko's fiance, Sakiya, killed him in retaliation for "kidnapping" him. He told Sakiya to hide his corpse from a police manhunt for him.

- Alexander von der Hünen

A German national who had killed Natsumi Sato after pushing her from his hotel room in Japan. Had manipulated Natsumi's sister, Harumi Fujita, to come with him to Germany. In the end, she returned to Japan with Kyoya with his child after he killed himself by starting a fire in the sewers by firing a handgun to the oil slick. Called himself the "Der Kalte" (Cold One) for his eye color. Had Inspector Hans Mayer of the German Police under his payment.
He is a known drug lord in the German underworld. Was the suspect in the death of Harumi's husband.
Killed his own mother at the age of 18 for despising his appearance. At the end of Volume 2, it seemed that Alexander von der Hünen had survived his self-immolation attempt in the sewers as he was seen to be walking out of the subway, who had decided to reform himself.

- Lisa Lewis

Nurse at the local hospital in New York. Had kidnapped Mika Schwart and planned to sell her in the black market. Had a dark history involving her foster father, who raped her at a young age and killed her own family by burning their house down, making police think that it was arson. Had shot two homicide detectives when they tried to question her. Is believed to be of Asian descent, possibly Japanese.

- Ichizo Imai/Nowell

Former Saitama Prefecture Police chief, was under the payroll of Kozo/Kuz Noda for a short time before he was shot in the head by Kent Noda at Narita airport.

- Hitoshi Kamiya

Accomplice of Akari. Helped her seal the fate of her uncle and aunt, who sided with Shigetoshi, Akari's grandfather.

- Akihiro Kitano/Kim Chan Ho (Kim in Ice Blade)

Kyosuke's/Tan's Korean-looking brother. Had been a leader of a smuggling gang in Russia. Was later killed by the mainstream Russian Mafia. Responsible for bringing Krab/Klauf to Kunashi Island with the three dissident Russian nuclear engineers after helping with Kyosuke's problems regarding marine catches (particularly fishes).
His head was delivered to Kai with a message in Russian that was scribbled on his head, "Return What You Took."

- Tatsuo Kondo

Being investigated by narcotic detectives for drug smuggling, he was assassinated by Kent Noda.

- Seiji Kusano

An ex-employee in the Ministry of Justice. His fiancee was raped and killed, her death avenged by his soon to be father-in-law. In order to gain attention for the Equal Rights Party, he administered certain doses of poison into the stream so as to get media attention.
He took his frustration out by holding the mother of his fiance's rapist hostage in her apartment in Shinjuku. After seeing Ozaju shot by his hostage, he attempted to kill her in retaliation, but Iida stormed the apartment and shot him in the hand.
He soon was arrested by Shinjuku Police for possessing an illegal handgun and attempted murder.

- Lin Fei

Sister of Lin Lin and wife of Fan Tianmin. While in Japan, she employed a hitman to assassinate every uniformed officer in the Shinjuku district in order to make her demand, which is the return of her sister's body, heard. Kyoya, in a prisoner exchange, shot her husband and brought her into custody, which possibly resulted in the collapse of Fan's cell.

- Keita Kaneko (Kinta)

Friend of Hiroki Osano. After Hiroki disassociated himself with him and Mako, the two tried to shoot him. Kinta shot at Hiroki but failed to kill him, and Kyoya killed Kinta in the return fire.

- Masako Murakami (Mako)

Believed to be in a relationship with Hiroki Osano. Tried to gun down Hiroki and Kyoya with Kinta's revolver, but backed out of her actions due to stress that she had experienced from Hiroki's "attempted suicide".

- Osamu Nimura

Head of the Nimura detective agency. Classmate of Saiki back in middle school. Was responsible for shooting Shizuka Sugihara in the head. Iida shot him in the head when he tried to ram Sugihara with his car.

- Hajime Ninomiya

Supposed to marry Atsuko Narita. Had confessed that he sold a list of Loans Best clients (An insurance company in Shinjuku) to his own ex-boss, Shinichi Okamoto.
Narita ended the marriage between him and his daughter, which was the main cause for Atsuko to have feeling for Kyoya.

- Kent Noda

Illegitimate son of Kozo/Kuz Noda, he killed Ichizo Imai and tried to destroy the plane that his father was on by trying to smash his car with the plane's landing gear. Kyoya, in the end, shot him as he drove the Ferrari at the Narita airport runway after realizing that he was being used by his own father.

- Kozo/Kuz Noda

A man suspecting of running a drug empire and the illegitimate father of Kent, he was arrested after his plane was "halted" by his actions.

- Minoru Nosaka

Father was Souichin Nosaka, ex-secretary of Ikuo Osano. Had planned to kill Hiroki Osano in revenge, but Kyoya critically wounded him with single shot that badly grazed his neck.

- Shinichi Okamoto

Friend of Hajime Ninomiya and head of the Loans Best company, had three 3 of its clients shot in order to obtain insurance money meant for their relatives. Was arrested by Kyoya and Hachimaki at a toilet in the Narita International Airport.

- Chiyoko Okazaki

Sister of Chihiro Okazaki. Had planned to kill Tsukamoto after finding out that her sister suffocated under carbon monoxide poisoning.

- Kazumi Okino

Main suspect in kidnapping Kayo Yamagata. Tried to gun down Kyoya, but was wounded in the leg. Once had Yamagata's child, but made herself sterile after aborting it.

- Hiroki Osano

Son of ex-Finance Minister Ikuo Osano, who had died in a local hospital. He was later arrested for playing a role in his attempted murder on his father. Planned to commit suicide on live TV worldwide in order to hide the truth of his father's death.

- Kichi Sanada

An obsessed painter, killed a local jogger after he descreated his "work", consisting of two foreign nationals making out in the park.

- Kazuya Saiki

An ex-photographer, specializing in warfare and conflict. His exposure to civil wars all over the world had left him obsessed with taking photos of dead bodies.
He asked Kyoya to take a picture of his body before he died of his gunshot wounds.

- Yoshiaki Saito

A former salaryman, he became enraged after Doctor Yoshida accidentally killed his daughter, Kaori, due to her allergic reaction against anesthetic during a routine tooth extraction at his dental clinic. Later stabbed Shingo Nakashima to death in order to enact his revenge and steal his sidearm. He used Nakashima's revolver to gun down Doctor Yoshida and Kirishima. Kyoya later shot him before he could gun down his ex-wife.

- Tohru Sakazaki

Hired out supposedly by the Shikano family to eliminate Iida, accused of killing a civilian. His superiors have tried to kill him and Iida by setting up an accident after they tried to blind him with bright light. He was eventually arrested at the end.

- Tae Sato

Accused killer of Naomi Sato. Dubbed by the Police as Female A due to a lack of any legal identification papers on part of her mother. She was supposedly responsible for chopping up her mother's body due to a willingness to alert her neighbors. Later, Kyoya and Eriko realize that she did it because she might be accused of being the killer since she did not kill her mother.
Earlier, she was mistaken to be known as Mie Tada when her first name was written in Katakana.

- Azusa Shono/Angel Shonn

A former teenager driven to suicide over her father's problems. Was arrested for the murder of Yamamoto, an executive in the Hanada Industrial Enterprises. Driven by her hatred to Kyoya and to the police for her arrest, she starved herself to death in a local prison. Her brother avenged her by kidnapping Yukari in retaliation. Kyoya had asked her to infiltrate Hanada Enterprises in order to get evidence regarding gun smuggling by the corporation in Japan.

- Hisashi Shono/Bruno Shonn

Azusa's/Angel's violent brother, driven for revenge to kill Kyoya after his sister died of starvation. Kidnapped Yukari and tried to shoot her, but was later shot by Kyoya in the neck. Was angry at his father for taking advantage of Azusa's/Angel's life insurance money in order to remove his debt.

- Kazuyoshi Shina

Stepfather of Yusuke Shina, was responsible for letting his ex-wife, Tatsuko, die after she slipped over the cliff when he grabbed her hand and yet, released his grip on her.

- Senshu Shinomi

Crazed media mogul and owner of the Mao energy drink corporation. Had hallucinatory effects that he accused most of society of "killing" his mother, Junko Shinomi, with the "devil" hand that pushed both of them onto the railway tracks that he planned revenge by adding subliminal content in Dive D's lyrics, resulting in a serious bloodbath. His planned "murder" on Jiro Akashi by using hypnotism did not work as his hallucinations had convinced him that Japanese society was his mortal enemy.
Unknown to him, his mother did plan to commit suicide over financial problems.
Kyoya offered him the "rough road" to peace by blinding him after plunging his fingers on his eyeballs.

- Nishimoto Sugihara

Head of a local art gallery and leader of a Yakuza faction, planned to kill Kazuya for tolerating Nimura to kill his daughter. Iida shot him later in the head when Saiki distracted him by taking his picture.

- Noriyo Sugihara

Mother of Shizuka and wife of Nishimoto. Killed by Osamu when he raided the Sugihara Industries building alone.

- Yasuyuki Sugita

Raised by his own mother, went to Kunashi Island in Hokkaido. Fed up with the system that runs Kunashi Island and the constant run ins with the Russian Mafia, he tries to escape with Nina, a Russian woman. He was assassinated by a Russian man named Krab/Klauf at the Shinjuku Police station underground parking lot alongside one of his police escorts, Yanagi, before he was scheduled to be transferred out to another prison.

- Toru Sugiyama

A local drug dealer, knew about the three deaths of the con men as he had extorted money from them. Tried to "disguise" Kaneko's entry as he tried to flush the man responsible for their deaths out of hiding. Was killed when the suspect shot him in the eye from the apartment door.

- Akira Suzuki

Known as Murderer A to the police. Became obsessed on the article written in various magazines about Female A, driving him to kill the reporters and a classmate of his due to his "claim" of defending his right to kill people. Though it did not show in the manga, he was arrested in the end for the murders.

- Akari Takumi

Acquaintance of Eriko Aizawa. Was in the center of a family scandal dating years when her grandfather, Shigehisa, tried to rape her in order to bear an heir to the Takumi family. Her mother slept with Akari's grandfather so as to protect her. She made love to her own grandfather, but planned to kill him with a katana until Eriko ended their starting friendship by wounding her in the shoulder after shooting her revolver.

- Shigehisa Takumi

Akari's grandfather, went insane after his son, Keitaro died of cancer and went mad badly as he wanted a successor to his family line. Had sexual contact with Akari and her mother in order to have a child.

- Kimio Tokuda

Former policeman, knew about Fujiwara's secret and helped him hide the corpse and disposed of his revolver. Later on, he wounded him in anger about his guilt. Kyoya eventually shot him when he held a guesthouse worker hostage.
Was the only surviving member of his family after his parents and brother were killed in World War II when American planes unloaded bombs into Tokyo.

- Takashi Tokura

Son of Yutaka and Naoko Tokura. Due to the pressure mounting on him on the divorce with his parents, he shoots himself in the head with his father's hunting rifle. His death drew his father into a temporary period of insanity before realizing his actions.

- Yutaka Tokura

Rising TV news reporter. Father of Takashi, who had killed himself over family pressure with the help of his friend, Aya Koike. Killed his ex-wife, Naoko, and her new husband Kengo Shimizu, who happened to be Yutaka's associate in the TV station, as revenge. Wanted to kill Aya after realizing that the girl had manipulated her. Kyoya killed the crazed TV host by shooting him as the elevator descended from the top floor of an abandoned building to the ground floor.

- Naoki Tsukamoto

Chihiro's ex-boss and rapist, his sadistic actions on her drove her to commit suicide. Had planned to start over, but was arrested by Kyoya for attempting to kill Chiyoko.

- Fujiwara

Ex-policeman in the 1940s who accidentally unloaded an entire clip from his revolver onto an armed robber after pulling out his automatic pistol. Hid the robber's body and resigned after Tokuda had done so. Felt guilty after police had found the hidden firearms stash, but was wounded by Tokuda.

- Gu

Worked in one of Fan Tianmin's legal shops in Japan, had dated Lin Lin for a short time and was in debt payment with another Taiwan mafia group, which resulted in Lin Lin's death. Was shot by Fan's gunmen back in Keelling, Taiwan.

- Hayashi

A local Cranium drug dealer. Offered Kyoya a sample of the drug in order to solve the mystery of the subliminal Mao energy drink commercials.

- Inoue

A Japanese national residing in China as an employee of Noguichi Commerce. Had unwillingly aided Kyoya in his investigation in Shanghai. During an attack in Li's mansion, Zhang had slashed him in the head before killing him by stabbing him at his back.

- Ken

Partner of Chiyoko, was responsible for "detaining" Tsukamoto's mother as a plan for her revenge.

- Kono

A local yakuza gang leader. Gave Hisashi a Soviet-made Tokarev pistol before he turned the weapon against him, shooting him and his henchmen to death.

- Li

A Chinese man who has connections with the People's Armed Police (PAP). Was stabbed by Zhang during an attack at his mansion. He gave the orders to assassinate Wang Kefan for bribing 5 Chinese officials without his consent.
Ordered the attack on his mansion after Kyoya tied him on his own car. Worked together with Wang Nan to arrange Wang Kefan's death.

- Liu

A Chinese delinquent who was paid to assassinate a Chinese national named Wang Kefan. Was killed by Hachimaki in a nightclub in Shinjuku city.

- Meng Lan

Sister of Liu. Wanted to avenge his death by assisting Zhang in killing a man named Li in Shanghai. Called Kyoya a "pig".

- Rudolph

Associate of Alexander von der Hünen. Was shot and killed by Alexander after pleading with him to surrender Harumi back to Kyoya.

- Sakiya

Fiance of Akiko Sawano. Hid Kiyoshi Hatano's corpse after shooting him with a stolen police revolver and hid his body. Eventually confessed to his deeds.

- Terasawa

Former convicted bank robber. Wanted revenge against the Shinjuku Police and particularly, in Kyoya, by using a truck bomb. Was killed by Kyoya during a Russian Roulette game when he knew that the .357 Magnum bullet was in the sixth chamber, not in the 7th as Terasawa warned him about.

- Yamagata

Once a police detective, had retired to settle into a family life. But his past came back when Kazumi confessed in a letter that she knew about his money laundering activities. Had bought a Tokarev pistol from a gun runner in order to gun down Kazumi before he would rescue Kayo.

- Wang Nan

Wife of Wang Kefan, who played a role in his death. During a raid by People's Armed Police (PAP) officers, she was shot and killed in automatic gunfire.

- Wu

A lackey of Fan's Taiwan cell stationed in Japan, had appeared in a local hospital and warned that police officers would be killed until Lin Fei's body is surrendered back to Lin Fei.

- Zhang

Friend of Liu back in China. Was wanted by Japan for Hachimaki's death. Back in Shanghai, killed by heavily armed People's Armed Police (PAP) paramilitary officers.

=== Victims ===
- Roxy

A prostitute working in Germany's red light district in Hamburg. Told Kyoya about Natsumi's presence in Germany. Was later killed by German mobsters. Before she died, she confessed her feelings to Kyoya, since she does not want him to die.

- Kohei Asada

Boyfriend of Eriko Aizawa. Near the end of the series, he was killed by Eriko's stalker after their wedding.

- Bianca James

Assistant of Nakahara. Killed by Lisa Lewis and staged her death to look like a suicide, throwing suspicion off her for a period of time, but the NYPD still knew that Lisa was the one who could have done it.

- Asami Kurata

Daughter of Asato Kurata. Laughed at Ran's "appearance", which covered her right eye with a bandage. Ran almost killed her with a box cutter for her antics if Kyoya did not put his arm near Asami.

- Lin Lin

Sister of Lin Fei, the wife of a Taiwan mafia leader. She was murdered by members of the Taiwan mafia stationed at Japan when they tried to kill her boyfriend Gu who won a substantial amount from the Mark Six lottery. Also, these mafia members were unaware that they killed the sister of their first lady, which caused the execution of the person who ordered the killing.

- Nao Matsubara

Daughter of actress Rena Matsubara. Accidentally committed suicide by walking into traffic after watching a subliminal TV commercial with messages that suggest she repent by killing herself after buying the Mao drink.

- Rena Matsubara

Mother of Nao Matsubara. Like her daughter, she too suffered the same fate. At the end, she was heavily crippled in another car accident, but was expected to recover soon.

- Chihiro Okazaki

An acquittance of Kyoya, was found frozen in a block of ice in her home that she shared with her sister. Later it was discovered that she had committed suicide two years ago after she was brutally raped by Naoki Tsukamoto and three of his employees, because she informed the police of his illegal drug activities.

- Shiro Okazaki

A drug user. Shiro and his friend Yasuo Yamamura went home early to watch a concert by Drive D, but unfortunately they took a drug called Cranium before that decreased their mental strength. This caused them to be susceptible to the same subliminal TV commercial Nao witnessed, which caused them to kill each other, then drank the others blood to relieve their intense thirst.

- Kanako Saito

Daughter of Yoshiaki and Kaori Saito. Her death, due to allergic reaction against an anesthetic liquid used during a dental operation, became the driving force for Yoshiaki in murdering Dr. Yoshida while Kaori had filed charges against him for Kanako's wrongful death.

- Kaori Saito

Former wife of Yoshiaki Saito, had divorced him after he was arrested by Kirishima, Kimura and Shingo Nakashima. Yoshiaki had targeted her after stabbing Nakashima and Kimura jumped to his own death, followed by the killing of Kirishima. She called her husband as "The Typhoon" after she isolated herself in an apartment building in the Daikan Mountains. Was "cared for" by Kirishima even if he had sex with her. She smiled to Kyoya after he had killed Yoshiaki before he could pull the revolver's trigger.

- Naomi Sato

Nothing much is known about her. Her supposed daughter, Mie Tada, killed and mutilated her corpse with a kitchen knife.

- Natsumi Sato

A Japanese national who studied at Hamburg University, was killed after Alexander von der Hünen pushed her from his Tokyo hotel room. Was discovered to be a heroin addict by Kyoya during his investigation.

- Akiko Sawano

Fiance of a potter named Sakiya who drove accidentally head-on to a Kanagawa Prefecture squad car. She died from her wounds.

- Takuji Sawano

Father of Akiko and Shoko Sawano. Was devastated at Akiko's death that he killed himself when lounging in his bathtub.

- Mike Schwart

Husband of Mika, who was shot in his apartment by Lisa Lewis in order to kidnap Mika and their infant child, Kyoko.

- Mika "Watanabe" Schwart

Japanese wife of Mike Schwart, was abducted with her daughter in order to bring her into the black market.

- Kengo Shimazu

Associate of Yutaka Tokura and second husband of Naoko Tokura. Yutaka had killed him and his ex-wife in retribution.

- Junko (Akashi) Shinomi

Late mother of Senshu Shinomi. Had killed herself at the Shinjuku train station over financial problems. Her son believed that someone pushed her off the train platform.

- Shizuka Sugihara

Daughter of Nishimoto and Noriya. Her rape and death at the hands of Osamu Nimura made Nishimoto angry with vengeance to kill Kazuya Saiki until Kyoya intervened in his personal vengeance and shot the man in the head.

- Naoko Tokura

Former wife of Yutaka Tokura, had named her new baby Takashi after her first child during their old marriage. Yutaka killed her and Kengo as an act of retribution. Her baby was left unharmed.

- Kayo Yamagata

Daughter of former officer Yamagata, she was kidnapped on her way to school with her older sister Akari by Kazumi Okino.

- Yasuo Yamamura

Another local junkie. Had killed himself after consuming Cranium with his friend, Shiro Okazaki.

- Miyuki Yoneda

Local high school student of Koran High. Was killed by an American soldier named Andrew Johnson as a means of retaliating against their bullying on Mami Nagai.

- Dr. Mitsuo Yoshida

A dentist with his own clinic, he was subject to a lawsuit from the Saitos for the accidental death of their daughter, Kaori. As part of Yoshiaki Saito's revenge plan, he had stormed his clinic and gunned him down with the stolen police revolver from Shingo Nakashima's carcass.

- Wang Kefan

A Chinese businessman who imported vending machines in Shanghai. Was killed by Liu in an assassination in Japan.

== See also ==
- Ice Blade
