= Tokyopop (magazine) =

American manga magazine

MixxZine Tokyopop
- Editor-in-chief: Lena Atanassova
- Categories: Shōjo, Seinen
- Total circulation: 1.5 million units
- First issue: July 1999; 27 years ago
- Final issue Number: August 2000; 26 years ago 13
- Company: Tokyopop
- Country: United States
- Based in: Los Angeles
- Language: English
- Website: tokyopop.com
- OCLC: 40924962

Tokyopop, originally named MixxZine, was a manga anthology published in North America by Tokyopop.

== History ==
MixxZine at the start published five manga series, two of which were shōjo (geared towards teenaged girls and young women) and two of which were seinen (geared towards young men):

- Harlem Beat
- Ice Blade
- Magic Knight Rayearth
- Parasyte
- Sailor Moon

Sailor Moon was taken out of the anthology and moved to Smile, as the seinen and shōjo content were hard to reconcile due to the vast difference in audiences, and as Mixx wanted to refocus the magazine towards high school and university/college-aged readers which focused more on shōjo titles.

When MixxZine was renamed Tokyopop in July 1999, the focus changed towards more information on Asian culture, along with manga and articles on J-pop, video games, and anime. The magazine was offered for free, and only a few manga titles were published in the magazine, rotating through the following titles:

- Magic Knight Rayearth
- Mobile Suit Gundam: Blue Destiny
- Parasyte
- Sorcerer Hunters

Tokyopop was eventually discontinued in August 2000.

== See also ==
- List of manga magazines published outside of Japan
