= Tsutomu Takahashi =

Japanese manga artist

- Born: September 20, 1965 (age 61); Tokyo, Japan
- Occupation: Manga artist
- Known for: Jiraishin, Blue Heaven, Skyhigh
- Website: Official Site

Tsutomu Takahashi (高橋 ツトム, Takahashi Tsutomu), born on September 20, 1965, in Tokyo, Japan, is a Japanese manga artist, who is well known for his manga Jiraishin. As of March 2006, he is married and has one child. His alias is Ichigo Nekota.

== History ==
He began his involvement in manga with the creation of Jiraishin (also known as Ice Blade), serialized in the Monthly Afternoon magazine and published by Kodansha, which made him a popular icon in Japan from 1992 to 1999. In late 1999, he published a single manga volume called ALIVE, published by Shueisha. Shortly afterward, he published Tetsuwan Girl, also carried by Kodansha.

Takahashi was a guest lecturer at Ritsumeikan University in 1998, giving a talk on "Expression." Many students and teachers noted that he was well-liked and popular due to his sense of humor and looks. His former assistant was Tsutomu Nihei, who went on to create the manga Blame!. Takahashi's travels to the United States, particularly New York City, enabled him to create scenes in Jiraishin that included English conversations. His travels also influenced him to make Kyoya, Eriko, and other Jiraishin characters speak fluent English.

Takahashi provided the cover art for Galneryus' 2017 album Ultimate Sacrifice.

== Works ==
=== Manga ===
- 69
- ALIVE
- Angel's Share
- Bakuon Rettou
- Black-Box
- Blue Heaven
- Dead Flowers - His first manga under the alias of Ichigo Nekota
- Hito Hitori Futari
- Ice Blade (Jiraishin)
- Sidooh
- Zankyō
- NeuN
- Yorishiroshi
- ROUTE69
- Skyhigh
- Skyhigh Karma
- Skyhigh Three Sisters of Tenmasou
- Tetsuwan Girl
- Jumbo Max

=== Music ===
- Ultimate Sacrifice by Galneryus - album cover

=== Videogames ===
- Demon Chaos
