= Ice Blade =

Japanese manga series

- First tankōbon volume cover, featuring Kyoya Ida

地雷震 (Jiraishin)
- Genre: Action; Detective
- Manga
- Written by: Tsutomu Takahashi
- Published by: Kodansha
- English publisher: NA: Tokyopop (dropped)
- Imprint: Afternoon KC
- Magazine: Monthly Afternoon
- English magazine: NA: MixxZine
- Original run: September 25, 1992 – November 25, 1999
- Volumes: 19
- Manga

Jiraishin Diablo
- Written by: Tsutomu Takahashi
- Published by: Kodansha
- Imprint: Good! Afternoon KC
- Magazine: Good! Afternoon
- Original run: November 7, 2008 – November 7, 2011
- Volumes: 3
- icon

Ice Blade, known in Japan as Jiraishin (Japanese: 地雷震; lit. 'Landmine Earthquake'), is a Japanese manga series written and illustrated by Tsutomu Takahashi. It was serialized in Kodansha's seinen manga magazine Monthly Afternoon from September 1992 to November 1999, with its chapters collected in 19 tankōbon volumes. The story follows Kyoya Ida, a plainclothes police officer, and his colleagues at the Shinjuku Police Department as they investigate and solve crimes in the Greater Tokyo Area. Sometimes, these crimes are solved with some prices to pay.

A sequel, titled Jiraishin Diablo, was serialized in Kodansha's seinen manga magazine Good! Afternoon from November 2008 to November 2011, with its chapters collected in three tankōbon volumes. It portrays Ida and his interactions with various people after his absence from the force due to an eye disease while hearing of mysterious deaths of villagers living in the fictional Amakura Island in Japan's Ishikawa Prefecture in the year 2008 while assisting a police detective in initially trying to figure out who or what was responsible for their deaths after it was reported back in 2007.

== Plot ==
=== Jiraishin: Ice Blade ===
Kyoya Ida is a hard-nosed detective from the Shinjuku Police precinct, known to use lethal force to solve cases whenever they need to be solved. He works in a bleak, gritty representation of Shinjuku alongside his partner Tsuyoshi Yamaki in hunting down suspects and arresting them before he was killed in the line of duty. Ida was later assigned to another partner named Eriko Aizawa, the two working together to solve cases pertaining to the city's interests.

=== Jirashin Diablo ===
In the year 2008, Ida was beginning to suffer from the effects of Keratoconus after leaving the police force. He later gets wind of mysterious deaths of an unknown plague that killed the villagers in Ishikawa Prefecture's Amakura Island when he meets up with Taichi Kogure, a detective of the Ishikawa Police precinct and a now grown up Aya Koike, who is a known information handler in the underworld.

== Publication ==
Written and illustrated by Tsutomu Takahashi, Jiraishin was originally published as a prototype one-shot in Kodansha's seinen manga magazine Morning in April 1989. (Note: Published in the magazine's 20th issue of 1989, cover dated April 27.) It was later officially serialized in Kodansha's seinen manga magazine Monthly Afternoon from September 25, 1992, (Note: Debuted in the magazine's November 1992 issue, released on September 25, 1992.) to November 25, 1999. (Note: Finished in the magazine's January 2000 issue, released on November 25, 1999.) One chapter that was set in Hamburg was co-written by German author Matz Mainka, and compiled in the series' second volume. Kodansha collected its chapters in 19 tankōbon volumes, released from October 23, 1993, to January 21, 2000. The series was republished in a ten-volume bunkoban edition from May 9, 2003, to September 12, 2003, and in a ten-volume shinsōban edition from February 23, 2009, to November 20, 2009.

The North American version of the manga, retitled Ice Blade, was serialized in Tokyopop's MixxZine magazine, but it was discontinued after three volumes. There were instances of censorship in some of its panels as MixxZine was a new magazine when it was released and thus did not wish to offend potential distributors.

It was licensed in France by Génération Comics; in Italy by Stars Comics; in Germany by Carlsen Comics; in South Korea by Samyang Comics; and in Taiwan by Tong Li Comics.

A sequel to Jiraishin, titled Jiraishin Diablo (地雷震 ディアブロ, Jiraishin Diaburo), was serialized in Kodansha's seinen manga magazine Good! Afternoon from November 7, 2008, to November 7, 2011. Kodansha collected its chapters in three tankōbon volumes, released from February 5, 2010, to December 7, 2011.

== Reception ==
Serdar Yegulalp of Advanced Media Network compares Jiraishin to Miami Vice as the "blood, grit, and sin spatter so thickly that it's a miracle you don't get your fingers dirty when you turn the pages". Reviewing the Tokyopop version in Manga: The Complete Guide, writer Jason Thompson found Ice Blade to be "stylish and effectively told" with its "interesting, far-out plots and a grim, hard-boiled feel".

It was nominated for the 23rd Kodansha Manga Awards in the general category in 1999.
