= List of Parallel Paradise chapters =

The chapters of the Japanese manga series Parallel Paradise are written and illustrated by Lynn Okamoto. The series started in Kodansha's seinen manga magazine Weekly Young Magazine on March 18, 2017. In July 2022, it was announced that the manga was nearing its climax. Kodansha has compiled its chapters into individual tankōbon volumes. The first volume was published on August 4, 2017. As of November 6, 2026, 33 volumes have been released.

Seven Seas Entertainment announced the acquisition of the manga in August 2019. It is being released under their Ghost Ship imprint, and the first volume was published on March 31, 2020.

== Volumes ==
No.	Original release date	Original ISBN	English release date	English ISBN
1	August 4, 2017	978-4-06-510095-0; 978-4-06-510223-7 (LE)	March 31, 2020	978-1-947804-71-5
1. "A New World – Meeting You" (落ちた世界 君と出会い, Ochita Sekai Kimi to Deai); 2. "Meeting! Breeding?!; 3. "Gimmick – Lyric" (ギミック リリック, Gimikku Ririkku); 4. "Secret Hidden Nectar" (秘密の秘蜜, Himitsu no Himitsu); 5. "Magic Fun with the Archer" (魔玩(まがん)の射手(しゃしゅ), Magan no Shashu); 5. "Ecstasy – Emergency" (エクスタシー エマージェンシー, Ekusutashī Emājenshī); 6. "Disappointment and Determination" (失意と決意, Shitsui to Ketsui); 7. "To Think – To Ponder" (思うこと惑(まど)うこと, Omoukoto Madoukoto); 8. "Swear it – Seal it" (誓(ちか)って 契(ちぎ)って, Chikatte Chigitte); Special: "Parallel Booklet I" (パラレルブックレットⅠ, Parareru Bukkuretto I) (LE only)
2	November 17, 2017	978-4-06-510351-7; 978-4-06-510826-0 (LE)	August 18, 2020	978-1-947804-72-2
10. "Singing Ringing"; 11. "Moaning <Morning>" (MOANING＜モーニング＞, Moaning Mōningu); 12. "Just and Bust" (性技と正義, Seigi to Seigi); 13. "You Called Out to Me" (われ、汝に呼ばわる, Ware, Nanji ni Yobawaru); 14. "The Planet Bathed in Purity" (清(さや)かに星は沈みぬ, Sayaka ni Hoshi wa Shizuminu); 15. "Eat the Meat!"; 16. "Misaki's Chastity" (ミサキの操（みさお）, Misaki no Misao); 17. "Gloomy Rumi" ("Roomi Gloomy"); 18. "Flame × Blame"; 19. "The Dark Night" (ダークナイト, Dākunaito); Special: "Parallel Booklet II" (パラレルブックレット II, Parareru Bukkuretto II) (LE only)
3	March 19, 2018	978-4-06-511039-3; 978-4-06-511496-4 (LE)	October 27, 2020	978-1-947804-80-7
20. "Virgin Please" (バージン・プリーズ, Bājin Purīzu); 21. "Live/Alive" (ライブアライブ, Raibu Araibu); 22. "A Beautiful End" (散華(さんげ), Sange); 23. "Indulge × Bond" (宴×縁(えんとえん), En to En); 24. "Honey Trap" (蜜壺の罠(ハニー・トラップ), Hanī Torappu); 25. "Drop"; 26. "Mumble and Marble" (マンブル マーブル, Manburu Māburu); 27. "The Rolling Stone" (ザ ローリング ストーン, Za Rōringu Sutōn); 28. "By the Way!" (バイ・ザ・ウェイ!, Bai za Wei!); 29. "Lying on the Beach"; Special: "Parallel Booklet III" (パラレルブックレットIII, Parareru Bukkuretto III) (LE only)
4	July 6, 2018	978-4-06-512025-5	January 5, 2021	978-1-947804-86-9
30. "Time and Tide" (タイム・アンド・タイド, Taimu ando Taido); 31. "Time Away from You" (君ト、フケル, Kimi to, Fukeru); 32. "Spicy Spiral" (スパイシー・スパイラル, Supaishī Supairaru); 33. "Fire on the Coast" (コースト・フィアー, Kōsuto Fiā); 34. "From the Bottom of a Gloomy Pit" (仄暗き洞(あな)の底から, Honoguraki Ana no Soko Kara); 35. "Sounds of Anguish & Forgotten Waters" (苦悶の闇 不問の海, Kumon no Yami Fumon no Umi); 36. "Tear"; 37. "Little Liddle" (リトル・リドル, Ritoru Ridoru); 38. "Sweet Sweat" (スウィート・スウェット, Sūwīto Sūwetto); 39. "Incite Mill" (インシテミル?, Inshite Miru?)
5	October 5, 2018	978-4-06-513146-6	April 27, 2021	978-1-947804-96-8
40. "Drip Sizzle" (しずくsizzle, Shizuku Shizuru); 41. "Invitation" (いざなわれ、いざなえる?, Izanaware, Izanaeru?); 42. "Beloved Liar" (ダイスキライアー, Daisuki Raiā); 43. "Long, Long Night"; 44. "The Big Melon" (デカメロン, Dekameron); 45. "Dis Appears" (ディス・アピアーズ, Disu Apiāzu); 46. "La Mer Noir" (ラメール・ノアール, Ra Mēru Noāru); 47. "Crisis × Kai × Monster" (危機×カイ×怪, Kiki × Kai × Kai); 48. "Bitter Bite"; 49. "Scream/Dream"; 50. "Before the Sun Rises..."
6	February 6, 2019	978-4-06-514568-5; 978-4-06-514977-5 (LE)	September 21, 2021	978-1-64827-485-5
51. "Re:birth"; 52. "One Hundred Years of Loneliness" (百年の孤独, Hyakunen no Kodoku); 53. "Morning Glory"; 54. "Peach on the Beach" (ピーチ・オン・ザ・ビーチ, Pīchi on za Bīchi); 55. "Ocean of Fate" (めぐりあい海洋(うみ), Meguriai Umi); 56. "Winding Tentacles" (くるくる☆テンタクルス, Kurukuru Tentakurusu); 57. "Tri-Femme Drifting in the Ocean" (海洋漂流tri-femme(トリファム), Kaiyōhyōryū tori-famu); 58. "Death or Love!" (デッド・オア・ラブ!, Deddo oa Rabu!); 59. "Mellow Melody" (メロウ・メロディ, Merō Merodi); 60. "Refrain" (リフレイン, Rifurein); Special: "Parallel Booklet IV" (パラレルブックレットIV, Parareru Bukkuretto IV) (LE only)
7	June 6, 2019	978-4-06-516134-0	November 16, 2021	978-1-64827-500-5
61. "Heaven and Hell" (天獄(てんごく)と地極(じごく), Tengoku to Jigoku); 62. "Glace Vanille" (グラス・バニーユ, Gurasu Banīyu); 63. "Dessert Comes After Mating" (デザートは交尾の後で, Dezāto wa Kōbi no Ato de); 64. "I Scream!"; 65. "Crescendo < Crescent" (クレッシェンド＜クレッセント, Kuresshendo Kuressento); 66. "Super Size Me" (ビッグサイズ・ミー, Biggu-saizu Mī); 67. "Exclusive Execution" (エクスクルーシブ・エクスキューション, Ekusukurūshibu Ekusukyūshon); 68. "Mage's Ambition, Girl's Hope" (魔女の野望 少女の希望, Majo no Yabō Shōjo no Kibō); 69. "Crimson Dreams" (紅繚夢 ～こうりょうむ～, Kōryōmu Kōryōmu); 70. "Remnant" (残滓(レムナント), Remunanto)
8	October 4, 2019	978-4-06-517233-9; 978-4-06-517234-6 (LE)	January 4, 2022	978-1-64827-512-8
71. "Sand Witch" (サンドウィッチ, Sandō Witchi); 72. "Watch Witch!"; 73. "Which Witch?"; 74. "Unidentified Showtime" (正体不明のショウ・タイム, Shōtaifumei no Shō Taimu); 75. "Breaking Dawn"; 76. "Uncrossable Borderline" (いけないボーダーライン, Ikenai Bōdārain); 77. "Shake Shame"; 78. "Play for Me!" (プレイ・フォー・ミー!, Purei Fō Mī!); 79. "Hungry for More, Bad Weather as You Come and Go" (満ち満ちて空腹往(ゆ)き往きて暗雲, Michi Michite Kūfuku Yuki Yukite An'un); 80. "Time Continues, But the Truth is Frozen" (巡る星霜凍る真相(めぐるせいそうこおしんそう), Meguru Seisō Kōru Shinsō); Special: "Parallel Booklet V" (パラレルブックレットV, Parareru Bukkuretto V) (LE only)
9	February 6, 2020	978-4-06-518218-5	March 8, 2022	978-1-64827-674-3
81. "Bunny Trap"; 82. "Sing Praises" (鼓腹激情(こふくげきじょう), Kofuku Gekijō); 83. "Open Shut Me"; 84. "Penetrate My Heart!"; 85. "Killing Me Hard"; 86. "Parallel Paradox" (パラレル パラドックス, Parareru Paradokkusu); 87. "Gate of Cheat" (ゲート・オブ・チート, Gēto obu Chīto); 88. "Secret Door (to My Heart)" (秘密の扉 （オープンハート）, Himitsu no Tobira (Ōpun Hāto)); 89. "Battery Badly!?" (バッテリー・バッドリー!?, Batterī Baddorī!?); 90. "Eat Me!"
10	May 7, 2020	978-4-06-519551-2	May 17, 2022	978-1-63858-193-2
91. "Inadequate" (贄きらない!, Nie Kiranai!); 92. "Kill la Kia" (キル・ラ・キア, Kiru ra Kia); 93. "A Life of Fantasy, a Mysterious Person" (夢幻ノ生幽玄ノ君, Mugen no Sei Yūgen no Kimi); 94. "A Guardian's Mission, a Scream into the Void" (護り人の使命 漏らせない悲鳴。, Moribito no Shimei Morasenai Himei); 95. "Groovy / Gloomy"; 96. "Ground Zero, a Terrible Manifestation" (災厄の根源 最悪の顕現, Saiyaku no Kongen Saiaku no Kengen); 97. "The World, a Plea, Magic Silver Eyes" (此岸 懇願 銀色魔眼, Shigan Kongan Gin'iro Magan); 98. "Opportunity Downwards" (機転 / 暗転, Kiten / Anten); 99. "Hurt the Heart"; 100. "I'm Devoted to You, Yet You Feel Nothing for Me?" (君だけに献身。私には無関心?, Kimi Dake ni Kenshin Watashiniha Mukanshin?)
11	August 5, 2020	978-4-06-520460-3	October 25, 2022	978-1-63858-240-3
101. "I Cannot Stay a Dreaming Virgin?!" (夢見る処女じゃいられない!?, Yumemiru Shojo ja Irarenai!?); 102. "Mid "Knight" Legend" (ミッド騎士(ナイト)伝説, Middonaito Densetsu); 103. "Drastic Measures" (一刀両男(いっとうりょうだん), Ittō Ryōdan); 104. "A Secret Forming" (秘めはじめ, Hime Hajime); 105. "Mysterious Tower / Bizarre Forest" (奇怪の城 / 森の怪奇, Kikai no Shiro Mori no Kaiki); 106. "Early Army"; 107. "Blood Wind, Showdown" (血風(けっぷう)、決闘(けっとう)。, Keppū, Kettō); 108. "The Iron Maiden" (鋼鉄の女騎士(アイアン・メイデン), Aian Meiden); 109. "Silver Bell Iron Curse" (銀(しろがね)の鎧鉄(くろがね)の呪い, Shirogane no Yoroi Kurogane no Noroi); 110. "White Night" (ホワイトナイト, Howaito Naito)
12	November 6, 2020	978-4-06-521373-5	January 3, 2023	978-1-63858-632-6
111. "Polluted White" (白ク濁ル, Shiroku Nigoru); 112. "Oath Pain"; 113. "Massacre!?"; 114. "A Desire for Time Lost" (失われた刻を求めて, Ushinawareta Toki o Motomete); 115. "The All-Seeing Witch of the Woods" (眠れる森の魔女, Nemurerumori no Majo); 116. "Despite Everything We've Been Through" (あんなに一緒だったのに, Anna ni Issho Datta Noni); 117. "Beauty and Longing and Heartache" (愛しさと切なさと心苦しさと, Itoshisa to Setsunasa to Kokorogurushisa to); 118. "Unbelievable Ambivalence" (アンビリーバブル・アンビバレンス, Anbirībaburu Anbibarensu); 119. "Step by Step, Case by Case"; 120. "Unbreakable Bonds" (斬れぬ絆, Kirenu Kizuna)
13	March 5, 2021	978-4-06-522578-3; 978-4-06-522577-6 (LE)	April 11, 2023	978-1-63858-758-3
121. "Days of Gaze"; 122. "Elfenried in the City of Forests" (森の街のエルフェンリート, Mori no Machi no Erufenrīto); 123. "Jerassic Park" (ジェラシック・パーク, Jerashikku Pāku); 124. "Castle Muscle" (キャッスル・マッスル, Kyassuru Massuru); 125. "Crying Climbing"; 126. "Part a Part"; 127. "Old Woman from the Cave" (巌窟媼(がんくつおう), Gankutsuō); 128. "Preparedness and Repentance" (覚悟と悔悟, Kakugo to Kaigo); 129. "Sly Negotiation" (こねこねごしえーしょん, Koneko Negoshiēshon); 130. "The Road Less Traveled is Full of Unknowns" (行きて満ち満ち 未知の道々, Ikite Michi Michi Michi no Michi Michi)
14	June 4, 2021	978-4-06-523665-9	July 11, 2023	978-1-63858-923-5
131. "Return from Darkness, Empty Moments" (闇からの帰還 空白の時間, Yami Kara no Kikan Kūhaku no Jikan); 132. "Confessions and Accusations" (告白と告発, Kokuhaku to Kokuhatsu); 133. "Hide and Seek, Light and Dark"; 134. "Tournite" (トゥルーナイト, Turū Naito); 135. "Pride and Conceit" (誇りと驕り, Hokori to Ogori); 136. "Crisis, Warning, Pleasure" (危機・戒・快!?, Kiki Kai Kai!?); 137. "A Tumultous Rendezvous" (波乱のランデヴー, Haran no Randevū); 138. "Does a Robot Dreams of a Cheerful Girl?" (ロボットは元気娘の夢を見るか?, Robotto wa Genki Musume no Yume o Miru ka?); 139. "Bitter Thoughts, Painful Feelings" (苦い思い出、痛い想いで。, Nigai Omoide, Itai Omoide); 140. "Astraya of Arlslayer (Justice of the Town of Prayers)" (祈りの街の正義, Inori no Machi no Seigi)
15	September 6, 2021	978-4-06-524764-8	October 24, 2023	978-1-68579-587-0
141. "Atrocious Crime, Atrocious Punishment" (非業の罪 非道な罰, Higō no Tsumi Hidō na Batsu); 142. "Kick Earth!"; 143. "Salvage Survivor" (サルベージ・サバイバー, Sarubēji Sabaibā); 144. "Memory Over!" (心の目盛りが限界突破!, Kokoro no Memori ga Genkai Toppa); 145. "A Female Prisoner's Ego" (ある女囚の我執, Aru Joshū no Gashū); 146. "Irrational Revenge" (理不尽リベンジ, Rifujin Ribenji); 147. "Unwanted Uninvited" (望まれざる者 招かれざる存在, Nozomarezaru Mono Manekarezaru Sonzai); 148. "Wanting for Time Lost" (失われた時間を求めて, Ushinawareta Jikan o Motomete); 149. "Serious Magical" (まぢかマジカル, Madjika Majikaru); 150. "Needless Readiness"
16	December 6, 2021	978-4-06-526173-6	January 16, 2024	978-1-68579-961-8
151. "Quiet Sizzle" (静かsizzle, Shizuka shizuru); 152. "Sour Potato, Sweet Potato" (酢芋甘芋, Su Imo Ama Imo); 153. "Heavy Memories" (重い思い出, Omoi Omoide); 154. "Heretic Declaration" (異端の判断, Itan no Handan); 155. "Chain"; 156. "Dreaming Girl"; 157. "Cry Me a Cat"; 158. "Revenge Hilarity" (報復絶倒, Hōfuku zettō); 159. "Sniper Snake" (スナイパー・スネーク, Sunaipā Sunēku); 160. "When You Witch Upon a Star"
17	March 4, 2022	978-4-06-527064-6	March 19, 2024	979-8-88843-415-4
161. "Secret Honey Wine" (ひみつの蜜酒, Himitsu no Mitsushu); 162. "Waited Wanted!"; 163. "Stumbling Upong a House...?" (ぽつんと一見、家‥‥?, Potsunto ikken,-ya‥‥?); 164. "Kiss/Kill"; 165. "Drain" (奴隷淫, Doreiin); 166. "Fragile Flyer"; 167. "Bonds Without Blood" (キズナキ キズナ, Kizunaki Kizuna); 168. "Disappointment!? Precipice! Under Lock!!" (心外!?断崖!門外不出!!, Shingai!? Dangai! Mongaifushutsu!!); 169. "Spirit Sword and Fighting Spirit" (魔剣と負けん気, Maken to Makenki); 170. "Flame of Crime" (業火, Gōka)
18	July 6, 2022	978-4-06-528412-4	June 4, 2024	979-8-88843-638-7
171. "Cause and Effect" (因果, Inga); 172. "Icon"; 173. "I Tried to Hide It, But to No Avail?...?" (忍ぶれど、色に出にけり‥‥?, Shinoburedo, Iro ni Denikeri‥‥?); 174. "I Can't Stop the Drama" (dramaticが止められない!, Dramatic ga tomerarenai!); 175. "Autarch Anguish" (暗君anguish, Ankun Anguish); 176. "Honor and Terror" (誉れと怖れ, Homare to Osore); 177. "Bonds with Blood" (キズとキズナ, Kizu to Kizuna); 178. "Oath/Sign"; 179. "Cruel"; 180. "Love the Scorned Beast" (愛を蔑んだケモノ, Ai o Sagesunda Kemono)
19	November 4, 2022	978-4-06-529805-3	October 8, 2024	979-8-88843-866-4
181. "Contrition" (刻悔, Kokukai); 182. "Walking in the Dark" (暗夜行, An'yakō); 183. "Integrity and Trials" (清廉と試練, Seiren to Shiren); 184. "Knight and Rarities" (騎士と奇略（きりゃく）, Kishi to Kiryaku); 185. "Fresh Blood and Purity" (鮮血と純潔, Senketsu to Junketsu); 186. "Light of Life"; 187. "Fill in the Blanks/Feeling Bright"; 188. "The Inexhaustible King of Beasts" (獣王無尽, Jūōmujin); 189. "The Merciful God" (慈悲深き神, Jihibukaki Kami); 190. "A Drop of Blood" (血沫, Ketsumatsu)
20	March 6, 2023	978-4-06-531066-3	December 17, 2024	979-8-89160-066-9
191. "The Beginning of the End" (おわりのはじまり, Owari no Hajimari); 192. "Unseen Curse" (みえないお呪い, Mienai Omajinai); 193. "Suddenly Stormy Love" (ラブ・ストーミィは突然に, Rabu Sutōmyi wa Totsuzen ni); 194. "The Forest is the Place to Hide the Strange" (奇を隠すなら森の中, Ki o Kakusunara Mori no Naka); 195. "Kagome" (篭女); 196. "Puppet Dreams and Awakenings" (人形の夢と目醒め, Ningyō no Yume to Mezame); 197. "The Witch's Special" (魔女のとっておき, Majo no Totte Oki); 198. "Boy Hunt" (ボーイ☆ハント, Bōi Hanto); 199. "Hunter Chance" (ハンターチャンス, Hantā Chansu); 200. "Hunter and Hunted" (狩るモノと狩られるモノ, Karu Mono to Kara Reru Mono)
21	June 6, 2023	978-4-06-531978-9	March 18, 2025	979-8-89160-572-5
201. "Blind Faith" (妄信して猛進, Mōshin Shite Mōshin); 202. "Change" (変わる態, Kawaru Sama); 203. "Changing Body, Unchanging Mind" (重なるカラダ、交わらぬ想い。, Kasanaru Karada, Majiwaranu Omoi); 204. "Immortal Path" (道ならぬ路, Michi Naranu Michi); 205. "The White Blade of an Impassioned Mind" (迫心の白刃, Hakushin no Hakujin); 206. "White Silver, Yellow Gold" (白銀と黄金, Hakugin to Ōgon); 207. "Evil Curse, Unjust Thoughts" (悪しき呪い あるまじき想い, Ashiki Noroi Arumajiki Omoi); 208. "A Friend from a Certain Perspective" (見方により味方, Mikata ni yori mikata); 209. "Destiny's Choice" (命の「選択」, Inochi no Sentaku); 210. "Mountains of Despair" (絶望ノ出ズル処, Zetsubō no Izuru Tokoro)
22	September 6, 2023	978-4-06-533008-1	June 10, 2025	979-8-89160-988-4
211. "You" (貴女, Kijo); 212. "The Magic of the Soul" (しんそうのまじょ, Shin Sō no Majo); 213. "Deep Current Pleasure" (深層快流, Shinsō kairyū); 214. "Sexual Desire Suppression" (性欲 / 抑制, Seiyoku Yokusei); 215. "Enduring Self-Sufficiency" (持久自足, Jikyū Jisoku); 216. "The White Knight and Red Priming Water" (白い騎士と赤い呼水, Shiroi Kishi to Akai Yobimizu); 217. "A Fierce Blow" (激烈なる一撃, Gekiretsunaru Ichigeki); 218. "The Back I Want To Slash" (斬りたい背中, Kiritai Senaka); 219. "Nightmare or Reality" (悪夢か現か, Akumu ka Utsutsu ka); 220. "Revenge/Avenge"
23	December 6, 2023	978-4-06-533626-7	September 9, 2025	979-8-89373-373-0
221. "A Nightmare for the Devil" (悪魔に悪夢を, Akuma ni Akumu o); 222. "Encouragement Arrangement" (チャレンジ☆アレンジ, Charenji Arenji); 223. "Naked Heart"; 224. "Standing Operation" (スタンディング・オペレーション, Sutandingu Operēshon); 225. "Maiden's Heart, Aim and Fire" (乙女の核、狙い撃ち♡, Otome no Kaku, Neraiuchi); 226. "Give me "the" Reason!"; 227. "Come with pleasure" (快来, Kairai); 228. "Boasting in a Cave" (洞の中の法螺, Hora no Naka no Hora); 229. "The Mystique of Rosehip" (ローズヒップのひみつ, Rōzuhippu no Himitsu); 230. "Monster vs. Miracle" (怪物VS．怪傑, Kaibutsu vs. Kaiketsu)
24	April 5, 2024	978-4-06-534911-3	December 9, 2025	979-8-89373-374-7
231. "Melty Soul" (メルティ・ソウル, Meruti Sōru); 232. "A Guide to Death" (逝先案内人, Yukisaki Annainin); 233. "Wild Maiden" (荒ぶる乙女, Araburu Otome); 234. "Black-haired Maiden and the Chamber of Secrets" (黒髪乙女と秘密の部屋, Kurokami Otome to Himitsu no Heya); 235. "Seeking My King!"; 236. "Blood Unity Memorial" (ツナガル・メモリアル, Tsunagaru Memoriaru); 237. "Condemnation of the Forbidden" (禁断のチの断罪, Kindan no Chi no Danzai); 238. "Flowing Bloody Tears" (血の涙積, Chi no Ruiseki); 239. "Melody of Horror, or Melody of Despair" (戦慄の調べ 或いは絶望の旋律, Senritsu no Shirabe Aruiwa Zetsubō no Senritsu); 240. "Witch of Drawing Blood" (彩血の魔女, Saiketsu no Majo)
25	July 5, 2024	978-4-06-536269-3	March 17, 2026	979-8-89373-716-5
241. "Displeasure With Dirty Sounds" (不興汚音, Fukyō waon); 242. "Toxic Chanting" (毒唱, Doku-shō); 243. "Bloody Tears Message" (血涙の伝言, Ketsurui no Dengon); 244. "Ecstasy of the Fierce Tusks" (忘我の暴牙, Bōga no Bōga); 245. "Love Wins?" (愛勝つ?, Ai Katsu?); 246. "Call Me Mama" (なすがママ, Nasugamama); 247. "Baby, I'm Madly in Love with You" (ベビーに首ったけ, Bebī ni Kubittake); 248. "Leave Love, my Mama" (愛のままに、我ママに, Ai no Mama ni, Waga Mama ni); 249. "Deathbed's Dream – Morning's Resolve" (末期の夢 覚悟の朝, Matsugo no Yume Kakugo no Asa); 250. "The Unknown Waxing Moon Night" (未知なる月満ちる夜, Michi Naru Tsuki Michiru Yoru)
26	October 4, 2024	978-4-06-537255-5	June 30, 2026	979-8-89561-185-2
251. "The Moon's Waning Face" (失貌の月, Shitsu Bō no Tsuki); 252. "Believe Achieve"; 253. "Forgotten God's Forgotten Item" (忘れられた神の忘れもの, Wasure Rareta Kami no Wasuremono); 254. "Arslayer Humiliation" (アルスレイヤの屈辱, Arusureiya no Kutsujoku); 255. "Pearls Before Swine" (豚に真実, Buta ni Shinjitsu); 256. "Pondering Blue" (思案ブルー, Shian burū); 257. "The Three Tenteko Sisters" (てんてこ三姉妹, Ten Teko Sanshimai); 258. "Dystopia" (無想郷, Musōkyō); 259. "Memento" (メメント); 260. "The Evidence Revealed" (明かされる証, Akasa Reru Akashi)
27	January 6, 2025	978-4-06-538171-7	September 22, 2026	979-8-89561-660-4
261. "Older Sister Too" (あねもね, Ane Mo ne); 262. "Seal of Innocence" (封淫, Fūin); 263. "Second Sister!" (二の妹!, Ni no Mai!); 264. "Resentment" (怨上, Onjō); 265. "Culture Shock" (カルチャー・ショック, Karuchā Shokku); 266. "Battle and Defense" (閨房と攻防, Keibō to Kōbō); 267. "Big Buddy with Big Body" (極限の巨躯, Kyokugen no Kyoku); 268. "Heartless Deeds" (所業無情, Shogyō Mujō); 269. "Cute Pair" (キューティ・ペア, Kyūti Pea); 270. "Miscellaneous Information About Festivals" (祭りにまつわるエトセトラ, Matsuri ni Matsuwaru Etosetora)
28	May 7, 2025	978-4-06-539621-6	December 8, 2026	979-8-89765-216-7
271. "Sonny Trap"; 272. "Saver of the Saber"; 273. "Red and Black" (赤と黒, Aka to Kuro); 274. "An Unexpected Outsider" (想定外の門外漢, Sōteigai no Mongaikan); 275. "Trump Card" (切り札, Kirifuda); 276. "Silver Lining"; 277. "Ambition" (志命, Shimei); 278. "To Use One's Teeth to the Death" (死牙にかける, Shiga ni Kakeru); 279. "Dawn" (世明け, Yoake); 280. "Talking Skull" (しゃべるこうべ, Shaberu Kōbe)
29	September 5, 2025	978-4-06-540794-3	—	—
281. "Harry Honey"; 282. "Drunken Battle" (背酔之陣, Haisui no Jin); 283. "Shame, Tears, Men and Women" (恥と涙と男と女, Haji to Namida to Otoko to Onna); 284. "Drunkard" (一心酒乱, Isshin Shuran); 285. "The Unknown" (道なき未知, Michi Naki Michi); 286. "Witch's Twilight" (魔女の黄昏, Majo no Tasogare); 287. "The Witches' Long Sleep" (魔女たちの長き眠り, Majo-tachi no Nagaki Nemuri); 288. "Confused Intercourse" (まよいまぐわい, Mayoi Maguwai); 289. "Strict Hallucination" (厳格なる幻覚, Genkakunaru Genkaku); 290. "Irritated Illusion" (イライライリュージョン, Iraira Iryūjon)
30	December 5, 2025	978-4-06-541755-3	—	—
291. "Trash & Trust"; 292. "Mistress Strange" (ミストレス・ストレンジ, Misutoresu Sutorenji); 293. "Night Eclipse" (夜蝕, Yashoku); 294. "Sleep Well Tonight, Knight" (今夜も眠れ騎士, Kon'ya mo Nemure Kishi); 295. "Bonds and Scars" (絆と傷跡, Kizuna to Kizuato); 296. "Grudge" (遺恨, Ikon); 297. "The King of the Night, Merciless to the Moon" (月に無慈悲な夜の王, Tsuki ni Mujihina Yoru no ō); 298. "Kiki the Witch's Sense of Danger" (魔女キキの危機感, Majo Kiki no Kiki-kan); 299. "The State of Mind and Death" (心の在処、死の在り方, Kokoro no Arika, Shi no Arikata); 300. "Sleeping Beauty of the Sea" (眠れる海の美女, Nemureru Umi no Bijo)
31	April 6, 2026	978-4-06-543196-2	—	—
301. "A World Yet to be Seen, an Unforgettable Feeling" (まだ見ぬ世界 消せぬ想い, Mada Minu Sekai Kesenu Omoi); 302. "Fall, My Darling" (落ちてマイダーリン, Ochite Maidārin); 303. "Peep & Leep" (ピープ リープ, Pīpu Rīpu); 304. "A Thousand Envies" (千の羨望, Sen no Senbō); 305. "Dead ENDymion" (DEAD ENDymion(デッド エンデュミオン), Deddo Endeyumion); 306. "Lonely Here and There" (あっちこっちぼっち, Atchi Kotchi Botchi); 307. "Be Your Girl!" (be your girl！(ビーユアガール), Bī Yua Gāru); 308. "Behind the Disappointment, in the Middle of Malice" (失意の裏側、悪意の真ん中, Shitsui no Uragawa, Akui no Man'naka); 309. "Eagle Lion and Dragon Knight" (鷲獅子と竜騎士, Washi Shishi to Ryū Kishi); 310. "Leigh-Mary and a Thief" (リーメアリーと一人の盗賊, Rīmearī to Hitori no Tōzoku)
32	July 6, 2026	978-4-06-544225-8	—	—
311. "Sleeping in the Robo Earth" (ロボ大地に眠る, Robo Daichi ni Nemuru); 312. "The Bandit Leader's Unearthly Secret" (賊長の俗ならざる秘密, Zoku-chō no Zoku Narazaru Himitsu); 313. "Devil's Face / Witch's Claw Marks" (悪魔の面影 / 魔女の爪跡, Akuma no Omokage/ Majo no Tsumeato); 314. "Endless Reign" (endless reign(エンドレス レイン), Endoresu Rein); 315. "Arrogant Flight" (傲慢飛行, Gōman Hikō); 316. "Successful Penetration" (首尾貫徹, Shubi Kantetsu); 317. "Killing Lost Time" (失われた時を殺して, Ushinawa reta Toki o Koroshite); 318. "The Resentment that Arises" (生まれ出づる怨み, Umare de dzuru Urami); 319. "Nightmares and Awakenings Brought By Evil Gods" (邪神のもたらす悪夢と目覚, Jashin no Motarasu Akumu to Mezame); 320. "Arrogance and Pride" (傲慢と驕慢, Gōman to Kyōman)
33	November 6, 2026	978-4-06-545494-7	—	—
321. "A Commendable Chance" (賞賛に値する勝算, Shōsan ni Ataisuru Shōsan); 322. "Beyond Anger" (怒を越える, Ika o Koeru); 323. "Geki Scales" (激鱗, Geki Uroko); 324. "Repentance and Scattering of Flowers" (懺悔と散華, Zange to Sange); 325. "Joker's Trump Card" (ジョーカーの切り札, Jōkā no Kirifuda); 326. "Severity" (厳しみ, Kibishi-mi); 327. "Retreat & Hide" (敗走 hide(敗走ハイド), Haisō Haido); 328. "The Unknown and the Whip" (未知とムチ, Michi to Muchi); 329. "Checkmate" (詰ンデレーション, Tsume Nderēshon); 330. "Just Drop By Empty-Handed..." (手ぶらでふらっと‥‥, Tebura de Furatto‥‥)

== Chapters not yet in tankōbon format ==
These chapters have yet to be published in a tankōbon volume.

331. "Reverse Me"
332. "Reality and Indecency" (うつつでふつつか, Utsutsu de Futsutsuka)
333. "I Don't Want to Leave" (離れたくない, Hanaretakunai)
334. "Beginner Graduate" (初心者卒業, Shoshinsha Sotsugyō)
335. "Animal Trail" (獣道, Kemonomichi)
336. "An Unexpected Reunion" (予期せぬ再会, Yoki senu Saikai)
337. "A Kindness Received in Childhood" (幼き日の恩, Osanaki hi no on)
338. "Karu's True Identity" (カルの正体, Karu no Shōtai)
339. "As a Guide" (導く者として, Michibiku Mono to Shite)
340. "One Without a Mark" (印のない者, Shirushi no nai Mono)
341. "The Nightmare Returns" (悪夢再来, Akumu Sairai)
342. "The Man Who Saves, The man Who Destroys" (救う男、滅ぼす男, Sukuu Otoko, Horobosu Otoko)
343. "Even Though There’s No Time" (時間がないのに, Jikan ga Nainoni)
344. "Promise with Slime"
