= List of Brynhildr in the Darkness chapters =

A chapters list of the manga by Lynn Okamoto, Brynhildr in the Darkness (極黒のブリュンヒルデ, Gokukuro no Buryunhirude). It was serialized by Shueisha in the seinen manga magazine Weekly Young Jump from January 2012 to March 2016, and was collected in 18 tankōbon volumes as of 19 May 2016.

== Volume list ==
No.	Japanese release date	Japanese ISBN
1	18 May 2012	978-4-08-879348-1
001. 'Aliens'; 002. 'Magician'; 003. 'The Hunt'; 004. 'I Want to See the Ocean'; 005. 'Lifespan'; 006. 'Medicine'; 007. 'Rank'; 008. 'Prayer'
2	17 August 2012	978-4-08-879397-9
009. 'Harnessed'; 010. 'Time Limit'; 011. 'Trust'; 012. 'Happening'; 013. 'Transfer Student'; 014. 'Astronomical Observation'; 015. 'Smile'; 016. '—'; 017. 'Destruction'; 018. 'Scapegoat'
3	19 November 2012	978-4-08-879433-4
019. 'The One Left Behind'; 020. 'Ordinary Life'; 021. 'After School'; 022. 'Believe Me'; 023. 'A Bit of Hope'; 024. 'Dark Clouds'; 025. 'A Date?'; 026. 'Shared Fate'; 027. 'Temptation'; 028. 'Breaking Through'
4	19 February 2013	978-4-08-879524-9
029. 'A Strange Characteristic'; 030. 'Jealousy'; 031. 'Oopsy?'; 032. 'Pursuers'; 033. 'Girl and Gun'; 034. 'Sweet Dreams'; 035. 'So Glad to Be Alive'; 036. 'Because We Are Friends'; 037. 'High Stakes'; 038. 'Gaze'
5	19 July 2013	978-4-08-879564-5
039. 'Those to Protect'; 040. 'Leads'; 041. 'Time Limit'; 042. 'In the Light'; 043. 'Not Normal'; 044. 'Nice to Meet You'; 045. 'The Price for Power'; 046. 'Death Sentence'; 047. 'Unchanging Future'; 048. 'Strategy Meeting'
6	19 September 2013	978-4-08-879651-2
049. 'Foresight vs. Foresight'; 050. 'Inside the Dream'; 051. 'Choice'; 052. 'The Fateful Day'; 053. 'Before Dawn'; 054. 'A Long Farewell'; 055. 'Everyone Together'; 056. 'The Ocean Is So Big'; 057. 'Trouble Maker'; 058. 'Unknown Voice'
7	19 December 2013	978-4-08-879669-7
059. 'A Wonderful World'; 060. 'Humanity's Strongest'; 061. 'A Strong Power'; 062. 'Blood and Sweat'; 063. 'Holding Hands'; 064. 'Point to Point'; 065. 'Wishing Upon a Star'; 066. 'The Flames of Vengeance'; 067. 'The Last Summer Vacation'; 068. 'Love Triangle'; 069. 'A Choice of Life'; Side story: 'Drier Revelations'
8	19 March 2014	978-4-08-879805-9
070. 'Fate's Prank'; 071. 'Value of Life'; 072. 'Goodbye, Our Happy Days'; 073. 'The Third Group'; 074. 'The Truth about Witches'; 075. 'Taboo'; 076. 'Special Girl'; 077. 'Their Bonds'; 078. 'Deal'; 079. 'Betrayal'
9	18 April 2014	978-4-08-879806-6
080. 'Difference in Power'; 081. 'Determination and Resolve'; 082. 'Goodbye'; 083. 'Abyss'; 084. 'Labyrinth'; 085. 'Intimidation'; 086. 'The Empty 10 Years'; 087. 'Hatching'; 088. 'Smile'; 089. 'Alone'; 090. 'Before Dawn'
10	18 July 2014	978-4-08-879865-3
091. 'A World Headed for Destruction'; 092. 'Nightmare'; 093. 'Boy and Knife'; 094. 'The Proof of Friendship'; 095. 'Confession'; 096. 'Revival'; 097. 'Confronting Despair'; 098. 'Kuroneko'; 099. 'The Final Battle'; 100. 'Kuroha Neko'
11	17 October 2014	978-4-08-890055-1
101. 'What Happened That Day'; 102. 'Traces'; 103. 'A Fresh Encounter'; 104. 'Transfer Student'; 105. 'Lost Memories'; 106. 'Searching for the Links'; 107. 'A Place to Yearn For'; 108. 'Institute V'; 109. 'Promise'; 110. 'War'; 111. 'Drasil'
12	19 January 2015	978-4-08-890103-9
112. 'Proof of Bravery'; 113. 'The Naked Hope'; 114. 'Trust'; 115. 'A Chance Meeting with God'; 116. 'Welcome Back'; 117. 'Over Action'; 118. 'A Familiar Face'; 119. 'The Future of Chivalry'; 120. 'The End of Perverted Antics'
13	17 April 2015	978-4-08-890146-6
121. 'The Dark Future'; 122. 'The Unavoidable Truth'; 123. 'Echoes of the Rain'; 124. 'Shattered Pieces'; 125. 'Foolish Humans'; 126. 'The Right Timing'; 127. 'Right to Refuse'; 128. 'Ripples'; 129. 'Your Memories'; 130. 'The First Time...'
14	17 July 2015	978-4-08-890229-6
131. 'Enraged'; 132. 'Disciplining the Prisoner'; 133. 'Suspicion'; 134. 'Pursuing the Pursuer'; 135. 'Remorse'; 136. 'The Limit of Comprehension'; 137. 'Ignorance and Bliss'; 138. 'What's Most Precious'; 139. 'The Courage to Love'; 140. 'Now I Know All'
15	19 October 2015	978-4-08-890275-3
141. 'Approaching the Core'; 142. 'The Greatest Magic'; 143. 'Onto the Stage...!'; 144. 'A Chance Encounter'; 145. 'Even A Hug Is...'; 146. 'Remembering the Memories'; 147. 'Twin Hopes'; 148. 'A Certain Man's Right'; 149. 'Happy Times'; 150. 'Declaration of War'
16	19 January 2016	978-4-08-890343-9
151. 'The Prisoner'; 152. 'A Desperate Choice'; 153. 'Promise'; 154. 'Those who are left Behind'; 155. 'An Unexpected Reunion'; 156. 'Impetus'; 157. 'Blasphemy'; 158. 'Crack'; 159. 'A Day to Commemorate'; 160. 'Goddess'
17	May 19, 2016	978-4-08-890387-3
161. 'Murakami's Memory'; 162. 'The Finishing Touches'; 163. 'An Unseen Threat Approaches'; 164. 'Goodbye'; 165. 'Backup'; 166. 'The Chosen One'; 167. 'The Plan Begins to Unfold'; 168. 'Adam and Eve'; 169. 'Smiling Face'; 170. 'At the Precipice of Despait'; 171. 'Teardrop'; 172. 'Elevator'
18	May 19, 2016	978-4-08-890436-8
173. 'Pride'; 174. 'Self-Confidence'; 175. 'Neko vs Onadera'; 176. 'The Beginning of the End'; 177. 'Determination'; 178. 'Decision'; 179. 'Kazumi Schlierenzauer'; 180. 'God'; 181. 'Together Forever'

Chapter names are from fan translation.
