= List of Oshi no Ko chapters =

Oshi no Ko is a Japanese manga series written by Aka Akasaka and illustrated by Mengo Yokoyari. It was serialized in Shueisha's seinen manga magazine Weekly Young Jump from April 23, 2020, to November 14, 2024. Shueisha has collected its chapters into individual tankōbon volumes. The first volume was released on July 17, 2020, and the 16th and final volume on December 18, 2024. It follows a doctor and his recently deceased patient who were reborn as twins to a famous Japanese pop idol and navigate the highs and lows of the country's entertainment industry as they grow up together through their lives.

In April 2022, Shueisha began publishing the series in English on the Manga Plus website and mobile app. In July 2022, at Anime Expo, Yen Press announced that they licensed the series for an English release. The first volume was released on January 17, 2023. As of April 28, 2026, 13 volumes have been released.

== Volumes ==
No.	Original release date	Original ISBN	English release date	English ISBN
1	July 17, 2020	978-4-08-891650-7	January 17, 2023	978-1-9753-6317-8
1. "Mother & Children" (母と子, Haha to Ko); 2. "Big Brother & Little Sister" (兄と妹, Ani to Imōto); 3. "Babysitter" (ベビーシッター, Bebīshittā); 4. "How to Smile" (笑顔の作り方, Egao no Tsukurikata); 5. "Director & Actress" (監督と女優, Kantoku to Joyū); 6. "Child Actors" (子役達, Koyaku-tachi); 7. "If You Fear Falling, You'll Fall Harder" (転ぶの恐れれば余計に転ぶ, Korobu no Osorereba Yokei ni Korobu); 8. "Ai Hoshino Part 1" (星野アイ前編, Hoshino Ai Zenpen); 9. "Ai Hoshino Part 2" (星野アイ後編, Hoshino Ai Kōhen); 10. "Introduction" (イントロダクション, Intorodakushon)
2	October 16, 2020	978-4-08-891717-7	May 23, 2023	978-1-9753-6319-2
11. "Audition" (オーディション, Ōdishon); 12. "The Third Option" (三つ目の選択肢, Mittsume no Sentakushi); 13. "Procedures" (手続き, Tetsudzuki); 14. "Connection" (コネクション, Konekushon); 15. "The Manga Drama" (漫画原作ドラマ, Manga Gensaku Dorama); 16. "Acting Skills" (演技力, Engi-ryoku); 17. "Staging" (演出, Enshutsu); 18. "Modest Praise" (小さな称賛, Chīsana Shōsan); 19. "The Entertainment Department" (芸能科, Geinō-ka); 20. "New Member" (加入, Kanyū)
3	February 19, 2021	978-4-08-891801-3	August 22, 2023	978-1-9753-6321-5
21. "The Dating Reality Show" (恋愛リアリティショー, Ren'ai Riariti Shō); 22. "Wannable Idol" (自称アイドル, Jishō Aidoru); 23. "A Mark" (爪痕, Tsumeato); 24. "Egosearch" (エゴサーチ, Ego Sāchi); 25. "Up in Flames" (炎上, Enjō); 26. "Storm" (嵐, Arashi); 27. "Viral" (バズ, Bazu); 28. "Role Creation" (役作り, Yaku Tsukuri); 29. "Perfect Copy" (完コピ, Kan Kopi); 30. "The First" (初めて, Hajimete)
4	May 19, 2021	978-4-08-891872-3	November 21, 2023	978-1-9753-6323-9
31. "My Love" (今ガチ, Ima Gachi); 32. "Appropriate Age" (適正年齢, Tekisei Nenrei); 33. "Motivation" (モチベーション, Mochibēshon); 34. "Lead" (センター, Sentā); 35. "Sense of Responsibility" (責任感, Sekinin-kan); 36. "The Night Before" (前夜, Zen'ya); 37. "Pressure" (プレッシャー, Puresshā); 38. "Fan of the Entire Group" (箱推し, Hako Oshi); 39. "Just a Little Fun Job" (ちょっと楽しいお仕事, Chotto Tanoshī Oshigoto); 40. "Sore Loser" (負けず嫌い, Makezugirai)
5	August 18, 2021	978-4-08-892056-6	February 20, 2024	978-1-9753-6326-0
41. "Staff Meeting" (顔合わせ, Kaoawase); 42. "Read-Through" (読み合わせ, Yomiawase); 43. "Losing Heroine" (負けヒロイン, Make Hiroin); 44. "Observation" (見学, Kengaku); 45. "Telephone Game" (伝言ゲーム, Dengon Gēmu); 46. "Stage" (箱, Hako); 47. "Visiting Her Workplace" (職場訪問, Shokuba Hōmon); 48. "Crunch Time" (修羅場, Shuraba); 49. "Rewriting" (リライティング, Riraitingu); 50. "Emotional Acting" (感情演技, Kanjō Engi)
6	November 19, 2021	978-4-08-892135-8	May 21, 2024	978-1-9753-6327-7
51. "Inquiry" (考察, Kōsatsu); 52. "Boyfriend, Girlfriend" (カレシカノジョ, Kareshi Kanojo); 53. "Playboy" (軟派, Nanpa); 54. "Axis of a Conflict" (対立軸, Tairitsu-jiku); 55. "Opening" (開幕, Kaimaku); 56. "Beginning of Competition" (緒戦, Shosen); 57. "Lousy" (ヘタクソ, Heta Kuso); 58. "Growth" (成長, Seichō); 59. "Admiration" (憧れ, Akogare); 60. "The Sun" (太陽, Taiyō)
7	February 18, 2022	978-4-08-892224-9	August 20, 2024	978-1-9753-6329-1
61. "Play Along" (受け, Uke); 62. "Ad-lib" (アドリブ, Adoribu); 63. "Genius Actor" (天才役者, Tensai Yakusha); 64. "Trigger" (トリガー, Torigā); 65. "Regret" (後悔, Kōkai); 66. "The Curtain Falls" (閉幕, Heimaku); 67. "Drinking Party" (飲み会, Nomikai); 68. "Liberation" (開放, Kaihō); 69. "Room Tour" (ルームツアー, Rūmu Tsuā); 70. "Flame" (火, Hi)
8	June 17, 2022	978-4-08-892363-5	November 19, 2024	979-8-8554-0559-0
71. "Pedestrian Bridge" (歩道橋, Hodōkyō); 72. "Freedom" (自由, Jiyū); 73. "Smart" (スマート, Sumāto); 74. "Takachiho" (高千穂, Takachiho); 75. "Mother and Mother" (母親と母親, Hahaoya to Hahaoya); 76. "Music Video" (MV(エムバ), MV); 77. "Reunion" (再会, Saikai); 78. "Use" (利用, Riyō); 79. "Duty" (役目, Yakume); 80. "Wish" (願い, Negai)
9	October 19, 2022	978-4-08-892429-8	February 18, 2025	979-8-8554-0561-3
81. "Rapid Progress" (躍進, Yakushin); 82. "B-Komachi Night" (B小町の夜, B-Komachi no Yoru); 83. "Obsessed" (入れ込み, Irekomi); 84. "Hard Selling" (売り込み, Urikomi); 85. "Calculation" (打算, Dasan); 86. "Assistant Director" (AD(エーディ), AD); 87. "Lies" (空音, Sorane); 88. "Offer" (オファー, Ofā); 89. "Cosplay" (コスプレ, Kosupure); 90. "Compliance" (コンプライアンス, Konpuraiansu)
10	January 19, 2023	978-4-08-892535-6	May 27, 2025	979-8-8554-0563-7
91. "Dig Deep" (深堀り, Fukaboriri); 92. "Ritual Purification" (禊, Misogi); 93. "Leak" (リーク, Rīku); 94. "Breakthrough" (躍進, Yakushin); 95. "Blindness" (盲目, Mōmoku); 96. "White Roses" (白薔薇, Shirosōbi); 97. "Together" (一緒に, Issho ni); 98. "Going Astray" (道を外す, Michi o hazusu); 99. "Drinking" (飲み, Nomi); 100. "Business" (営業, Eigyō)
11	March 17, 2023	978-4-08-892630-8	August 26, 2025	979-8-8554-0565-1
101. "Predicament" (窮地, Kyūchi); 102. "Idol and Love" (アイドルと恋愛, Aidoru to ren'ai); 103. "Scandal" (スキャンダル, Sukyandaru); 104. "Countermeasure" (対策, Taisaku); 105. "Reporter" (記者, Kisha); 106. "Breaking Off" (決裂, Ketsuretsu); 107. "Friends" (友達, Tomodachi); 108. "Plan" (計画, Keikaku); 109. "Night" (夜, Yoru); 110. "How It Began" (それが始まり, Sore ga hajimari)
12	July 19, 2023	978-4-08-892780-0	December 16, 2025	979-8-8554-0567-5
111. "Mammon-Worship and Passion" (拝金と情熱, Haikin to jōnetsu); 112. "Towards the Future" (未来に向けて, Mirai ni mukete); 113. "Commercial Work" (商業作品, Shōgyō sakuhin); 114. "Interpersonal Audition" (個人間オーディション, Kojin-kan ōdishon); 115. "Roles" (役, Yaku); 116. "Responsibility" (責任, Sekinin); 117. "Panda" (パンダ, Panda); 118. "Activation" (始動, Shidō); 119. "Biological Mother" (実母, Jitsubo); 120. "Lack of Ability" (実力不足, Jitsuryokufusoku)
13	November 17, 2023	978-4-08-893002-2	April 28, 2026	979-8-8554-0569-9
121. "Sarina Tendouji" (天童寺さりな, Tendōji Sarina); 122. "Doc" (せんせ, Sense); 123. "Bad Move" (悪手, Akushu); 124. "Reversal" (反転, Hanten); 125. "Dazzled" (眩, Mabayu); 126. "Management" (マネジメント, Manejimento); 127. "Scouting a Girl" (ガールスカウト, Gārusukauto); 128. "Script Reading" (本読み, Hon Yomi); 129. "Piece" (ピース, Pīsu); 130. "Basic Tactic" (基本戦術, Kihon Senjutsu); Interlude Chapter 1; Interlude Chapter 2; Interlude Chapter 3; Interlude Chapter 4
14	April 18, 2024	978-4-08-893172-2	November 24, 2026	979-8-8554-3968-7
131. "Atonement" (贖罪, Shokuzai); 132. "Nino" (ニノ); 133. "Acting" (芝居, Shibai); 134. "Depths" (奥底, Okusoko); 135. "By Her Side" (傍, Hata); 136. "Fight" (喧嘩, Kenka); 137. "Idol" (偶像, Gūzō); 138. "Amends" (清算, Seisan); 139. "Lookism" (ルッキズム, Rukkizumu); 140. "Is This Right?" (正しいですか?, Tadashīdesu Ka?); 141. "Chain" (連鎖, Rensa)
15	July 18, 2024	978-4-08-893303-0	February 23, 2027	979-8-8554-3970-0
142. "Responsibility" (責任, Sekinin); 143. "Blind Follower" (全肯定オタク, Zen Kōtei Otaku); 144. "Fan of the Originals" (原作ファン, Gensaku Fan); 145. "Children" (子供たち, Kodomo-tachi); 146. "Role" (役柄, Yakugara); 147. "WISH" (願い, Negai); 148. "End of Summer" (夏の終わり, Natsunoowari); 149. "By the Sea" (海にて, Umi Nite); 150. "Knife" (ナイフ, Naifu); 151. "Catch Ball" (キャッチボール, Kyatchi Bōru); 152. "Interview" (インタビュー, Intabyū)
16	December 18, 2024	978-4-08-893474-7; 978-4-08-893575-1 (SE)	—	—
153. "Fiction" (フィクション, Fikushon); 154. "15-Year-Lie" (15年の嘘, Jūgo-Nen no Uso); 155. "Happy End" (ハッピーエンド, Happīendo); 156. "MEMe"; 157. "An Ordinary Day, A Wonderful Day" (なんにもない日、すてきな日, Nannimo Nai Hi, Suteki na Hi); 158. "Jewel" (宝石, Hōseki); 159. "Resonance" (共振, Kyōshin); 160. "Eye"; 161. "Future" (未来, Mirai); 162. "Aqua Hoshino" (星野アクア, Hoshino Akua); 163. "You" (君, Kimi); 164. "Finale" (終幕, Shūmaku); 165. "And Then" (そして, Soshite); 166. "Star" (星, Hoshi)
