= Kimi wa Midara na Boku no Joō =

Japanese manga series by Lynn Okamoto and Mengo Yokoyari

- First tankōbon volume cover

君は淫らな僕の女王
- Genre: Erotic comedy
- Manga
- Written by: Lynn Okamoto
- Illustrated by: Mengo Yokoyari
- Published by: Shueisha
- Imprint: Young Jump Comics
- Magazine: Weekly Young Jump; Miracle Jump; Young Jump Gold
- Original run: January 19, 2012 – August 31, 2017
- Volumes: 2
- icon

Kimi wa Midara na Boku no Joō (君は淫らな僕の女王; lit. 'You Are the Queen for Indecent Me') is a Japanese manga series written by Lynn Okamoto and illustrated by Mengo Yokoyari. It was irregularly serialized in Shueisha's Weekly Young Jump, Miracle Jump and Young Jump Gold manga magazines from January 2012 to August 2017, with its chapters collected in two tankōbon volumes.

== Plot ==
Akira Saitou was a close friend with tomboyish Subaru Kawana when they were kids, but Subaru was forced to study in a prestigious private high school because of her family's rich status. But via a special scholarship plan, Akira followed his childhood friend and managed to enter the same high school as Subaru. Even though he reunites with Subaru, she has grown into a talented and beautiful woman and has become distant to him. Subaru keeps a cold attitude towards Akira but he wants to somehow shorten the distance between them. Akira troubled with Subaru's cold attitude, remembers a mistakenly overheard conversation of some girls in which they're talking about a God named "Ura no Kamisama" who fulfill your wish if you cast a spell and say a wish, in exchange of something. He muttered the spell and wishes that his room will connect to Subaru's and his wish magically comes true. He later found that Subaru actually wished the same thing as him, and "Self-control" of a person is the price at which the wish comes true, but Subaru wished earlier than him so only she loses her self-control for one hour per day. Akira and Subaru are forced to live together due to their room being connected. In spite of that, Subaru does not show any signs like she is compromising. Subaru sees him with cold eyes like watching an insect. However, when Subaru's self restraint was taken her usual cold attitude starting to looks like a lie to Akira.

== Publication ==
Written by Lynn Okamoto and illustrated by Mengo Yokoyari, two one-shot chapters of Kimi wa Midara na Boku no Joō were published in Shueisha's seinen manga magazine Weekly Young Jump on January 19 and June 21, 2012. It was then serialized in Miracle Jump from August 16 to December 27, 2012. The manga was irregularly published in Weekly Young Jump in 2013: on February 4; on August 8; August 22; and November 14. An eight-page extra chapter was published in Miracle Jump on March 17, 2015. Another chapter was published in Weekly Young Jump on February 25, 2016. A chapter was published in Young Jump Gold on May 18, 2017. The last chapter was published in Weekly Young Jump on August 31, 2017. Shueisha collected its chapters in two tankōbon volumes, released on February 19, 2013, and November 17, 2017.

=== Volumes ===
No.	Release date	ISBN
1	February 19, 2013	978-4-08-879525-6
2	November 17, 2017	978-4-08-890753-6

== Reception ==
The first volume debuted as the best-selling manga volume in February 2013. By November 2013, the series had over 170,000 copies in circulation. By August 2017, it had over 260,000 copies in circulation.
