= Brynhildr in the Darkness =

Japanese manga series

- First tankōbon volume cover, featuring Neko Kuroha

極黒のブリュンヒルデ (Gokukoku no Buryunhirude)
- Genre: Dark fantasy; Mystery; Science fiction
- Manga
- Written by: Lynn Okamoto
- Published by: Shueisha
- English publisher: Shueisha (digital)
- Imprint: Young Jump Comics
- Magazine: Weekly Young Jump
- Original run: January 26, 2012 – March 31, 2016
- Volumes: 18
- Anime television series
- Directed by: Kenichi Imaizumi
- Produced by: Hiroaki Tsunoda; Shunsuke Nara; Fumihiko Kimura; Norihiro Itō
- Written by: Yukinori Kitajima
- Music by: Nao Tokisawa
- Studio: Arms
- Licensed by: AUS: Hanabee; NA: Sentai Filmworks; UK: Animatsu Entertainment
- Original network: Tokyo MX, ytv, CTV, BS11, AT-X
- English network: SEA: Animax Asia
- Original run: April 6, 2014 – June 29, 2014
- Episodes: 13 + OVA
- Novel

Brynhildr in the Darkness: The Moment
- Written by: Makoto Narikami
- Published by: Shueisha
- Imprint: Jump J-Books
- Published: April 18, 2014
- icon

Brynhildr in the Darkness (Japanese: 極黒のブリュンヒルデ, Hepburn: Gokukoku no Buryunhirude; lit. 'Extreme-Black Brynhildr') is a Japanese manga series written and illustrated by Lynn Okamoto. It was serialized in Shueisha's seinen manga magazine Weekly Young Jump from January 2012 to March 2016, with its chapters collected in 18 tankōbon volumes. The series follows Ryouta Murakami, a young boy obsessed with proving that aliens exist, who sees someone that looks just like his deceased girlfriend. An anime television series adaptation by Arms aired between April and June 2014.

== Plot ==
Ryouta Murakami along with his childhood friend, Kuroneko set out to search for signs of alien life. Although Ryouta is skeptical about her theory, Kuroneko insists that aliens are real. During their search, an accident occurs which gravely injures Ryouta and kills Kuroneko. Due to his strong memory, Ryouta cannot forget about Kuroneko. Since then, he has been continuously staring at the night sky in order to prove that aliens exist, and also to fulfill Kuroneko's dying wish.

Ten years later, Ryouta is a top student at his school and the sole member of the Astronomy Club, but he is taken aback when a new transfer student named "Neko Kuroha" arrives in his class. She bears a striking resemblance to Ryouta's dead childhood friend, although she dismisses the fact as a bluff. Ryouta later notices something amiss about Neko: First, when a student is miraculously saved after nearly drowning by a mysterious force; and later when Neko predicts that Ryouta will also die and displays superhuman strength when saving him. It is then revealed that Neko is a witch who escaped from an alien research lab.

Ryouta becomes a part of Neko's life, learning more about her dilemma and the hidden forces that exist in the universe. As he sinks deeper and deeper into a world of magic and artificially created witches, Ryouta must use any means necessary to preserve and shelter other escaped witches and allow them to live normally, despite knowing the scientists of the lab would kill any outsiders involved.

== Characters ==
=== Astronomy Club ===
Ryouta Murakami (村上 良太, Murakami Ryōta)
Voiced by: Ryōta Ōsaka (Japanese); Blake Shepard (English)
Ryouta is a high school astronomy club president with a photographic memory, stemming from his connection to the Edda through Vingulf experiments. Bound by a childhood promise to Kuroneko (Neko), he shelters magic-users in an abandoned observatory while seeking "Death Suppressants" to delay their Hatching process. After Valkyria's incident, he struggles to restore Neko's memories. Kidnapped by Vingulf, Ryouta discovers his experimental origins and shortened lifespan. After his and Neko's final confrontation with Loki, the two join together in Edda permanently, where they encounter a child resembling Kazumi.
Neko Kuroha (黒羽 寧子, Kuroha Neko) / Kuroneko (クロネコ)
Voiced by: Risa Taneda (Japanese); Jamie Marchi (English)
Neko is a B-rank magic-user with telekinetic abilities, capable of destroying inorganic matter. Identical to Ryouta's presumed-deceased childhood friend Kuroneko (confirmed by a three-dot birthmark), she bears research number 7620. Memory loss accompanies her power usage, prompting Ryouta to limit its activation. As astronomy club vice-president, she privately enjoys singing while researching constellation totals. Her true nature emerges as a prototype Valkyria with latent SS-rank powers, potentially the sought-after Brynhildr. This awakening grants Mako-like abilities, including micro black hole creation used to defeat anti-matter—ran exertion that erases all memories. The amnesiac Neko initially treats Ryouta coldly until rediscovering emotions through her past writings. After her and Ryouta's final confrontation with Loki, the two join together in Edda permanently, where they encounter a child resembling Kazumi.
Kana Tachibana (橘 佳奈, Tachibana Kana)
Voiced by: Aya Suzaki (Japanese); Christina Stroup (English)
Kana, research number 4010, is a paralyzed C-rank magic-user who foresees imminent deaths through her left hand. She communicates via voice synthesizer and consumes liquefied food. Initially hostile, she gradually warms to Ryouta's group while serving as their club mascot. Though capable of movement (as noted by Kazumi), she remains immobilized to preserve her power for protecting Neko. After activating her harness' top button, she regains mobility at the cost of foresight, though later develops precise crisis premonitions. Her bond with Mina eventually surpasses her loyalty to Ryouta.
Kazumi Schlierenzauer (カズミ・シュリーレンツァウアー, Kazumi Shurīrentsauā)
Voiced by: M.A.O (Japanese); Emily Neves (English)
Kazumi (research number 2670) is a B-rank magic-user specializing in rapid computer hacking and decryption. A half-Austrian who speaks Kansai dialect, she infiltrates Ryouta's school and club. Though prone to lewd behavior and sensitive about her physique, she develops genuine feelings for Ryouta, wishing to bear his child as existential proof. Her true abilities exceed AAA-rank classification. During Loki's assault, she sacrifices herself by hacking Edda's genetic memory—reducing Ryouta to instinctual behavior while her body dissolves. She ultimately survives this ordeal.
Kotori Takatori (鷹鳥 小鳥, Takatori Kotori)
Voiced by: Azusa Tadokoro (Japanese); Jessica Calvello (English)
Kotori (research number 1107) is a B-rank magic-user specializing in spatial transposition, effectively teleporting objects while nullifying their kinetic energy. A clumsy but optimistic cook, she joins Ryouta's astronomy club. The institute targets her as a potential existential threat, later proven when her latent abilities emerge: the Grane-based magic negation and the apocalyptic "Ain Soph Aur" light that merges all cellular life. She activates this final ability to save the world through self-ejection. Her origin as an alien vessel is revealed posthumously, with a clone briefly assisting the astronomy club before perishing.
Hatsuna Wakabayashi (若林 初菜, Wakabayashi Hatsuna)
Voiced by: Yumi Uchiyama (Japanese); Carolyn Johnson (English)
Hatsuna is an A-rank magic-user with potent regenerative abilities, capable of restoring fatal injuries to herself or others within a five-minute window. Her power enables complete regeneration from just her harness, making her virtually indestructible unless deprived of medication or ejected. After testing Ryouta's loyalty, she develops strong affection for him and becomes vital to the astronomy club's survival. She forms a bond with classmate Takaya, but upon hatching, she kills him when he intervenes. Makina destroys her body, though her surviving Drasil unexpectedly revives both herself and Takaya.

=== Vingulf ===
A Sorcerian secret research organization that discovered alien remains in Germany in 1910 through a joint operation involving gold miners and Ryouta's great-grandfather, a Japanese geologist. Rather than disclosing the finding, the group initiated classified studies aimed at achieving divine annihilation. Relocating to Japan during World War II, the organization established autonomous operations. It currently maintains research subject A008 and Loki in incubation for their role in humanity's prophesied transformation.

Chisato Ichijiku (九 千怜, Ichijiku Chisato)
Voiced by: Hiroki Tōchi (Japanese); Adam Noble (English)
The chief professor overseeing magic-user experiments, he views B-rank subjects as failures and pursues perfect alien specimens at any cost. A protease enzyme developer in college, he leads the retrieval of Kotori. Initially unaware of Ryouta's involvement, he confirms it through Mako. His sole empathy is shown toward his deceased sister Rena (九 怜奈, Ichijiku Rena), whose brain he implants into Kotori's Grane harness against orders. He dies shielding Mako from gunfire.
Kurofuku (黒服; 'Black Suit')
Voiced by: Tatsuhisa Suzuki (Japanese); Ty Mahany (English)
A research staff member initially sympathetic toward magic-users, valued by Chisato for his intellect. After failing to capture fugitive B-rank subjects, he is dismissed and survives an assassination attempt that causes brain damage. Abducted from hospitalization by Mina, he later recovers and locates the magic-users' hideout, demonstrating unexpected combat prowess against Takaya. Upon learning of Nanami's forgiveness and Chisato's death, he abandons his mission and joins Hexenjagd at Miki's invitation.
Yuki Tsuchiya (土屋 邑貴, Tsuchiya Yuki)
A newly-appointed employee placed to work at the Vingulf research lab. Not suitable for the job, however, she finds sympathy with the aliens and magic-users. She teams with Kazumi and the astronomy club during their infiltration inside the institute.
Onodera (小野寺)
A woman who is Chisato's replacement and acquainted with the higher-ups. She has a sadistic and nearly bipolar personality and is also a magic-user with a harness just like that of Valkyria. It is shown that she can negate anti-matters. She has a shadowy objective when literally sending out magic-users that are about to hatch and ensure chaos. Onodera intends to use Valkyria to shape the world.
Makina (マキナ) / Yuuta Murakami (村上 湧太, Murakami Yūta)
Makina, originally named Yuuta Murakami, is Ryouta's presumed-deceased younger brother and Sorcerian's prototype hybrid. His unstable physiology deteriorates outside controlled environments. Possessing superior destructive and teleportation abilities beyond Valkyria, he attempts to claim Neko, triggering conflict with Ryouta. During a global broadcast, he assassinates the President of the United States to prevent alien disclosure, aspiring to become humanity's new Adam. After Sorcerian's revival renders him obsolete, he is consumed. Vingulf subsequently reveals Ryouta as his designated replacement.
Takachiho Murakami (村上 高千穂, Murakami Takachiho)
Takachiho, father of Makina and Ryouta, leads Vingulf while maintaining a fabricated death. He controls Sorcerian—the conscious origin of all Drasils—which awaited a Valkyria before acting. His objective is reviving Loki to annihilate and remake humanity, for which purpose he engineered his sons as alien-human hybrids. Though claiming paternal care for Ryouta while indoctrinating him with religious concepts, Takachiho is ultimately killed by Loki.

=== Other Witches ===
Nanami Tokou (斗光 奈波, Tokō Nanami)
Voiced by: Manami Numakura (Japanese); Molly Searcy (English)
Nanami (research number 5210), a soft-spoken AA-rank magic-user with memory manipulation abilities, develops admiration for Ryouta's observational skills. After her physical form dissolves from harness ejection, she persists as a consciousness within Ryouta's mind, manifesting during critical moments. Her illusions grow tangible over time, including an Aphrodite projection, though this cognitive occupation dangerously expands. To preserve Ryouta's life, she guides him to document essential Vingulf intelligence before erasing herself from his memory, resulting in her complete termination—retained only as a name in Ryouta's recollection.
Kikako (キカコ)
Voiced by: Yuu Hamagashira (Japanese); Cayla Coats (English)
Kikako (research number 5010), an AA-rank magic-user designated "Bombardment Unit", fires destructive energy beams from her mouth for assassinations. Defeated when Kotori binds herself to a pole and swaps their positions, Kikako is returned to the lab. Though promised clemency for mission completion, she faces violent interrogation about the Kotori encounter.
Saori (沙織)
Voiced by: Sayuri Yahagi (Japanese); Kira Vincent-Davis (English)
An AA-rank hybrid magic-user with two types of magic: Being able to slice anything within a 3-meter radius around herself, and manipulating time by one minute; although it will cause her to hang up immediately. Her research number is 6001. She dies after failing to kill Neko, melting away after her harness is ejected.
Freya (フレイヤー)
An AAA-rank magic-user. She possesses the power of technopathy and has computer hacking skills akin to Kazumi, even being implied to be the most powerful in that regard. Chisato gave Freya a room full of video games in exchange for her cooperation and is now under the care of Yuki. Freya briefly engages in a battle against Kazumi.
Mizuka (瑞花)
Codenamed Skadi. The strongest AAA-rank magic-user. She possesses the power of foresight, much like Kana. The difference between their abilities though is that Mizuka sees the future via her dreams and can peer further than Kana as well as with an accuracy of 100%. However, much like that of Kana, Mizuka's body also suffered a massive penalty for this power and is unable to move nor hear. Mizuka bonds with Yuki. In a future dream, she gives Kazumi options as to which future she wishes to choose. Using the last of her power, she melts the moment she informs Kurofuku of Kotori's whereabouts. It is presumed that Mizuka predicted the entire series' events.
Rie (理依), Misaki (美咲), and Rurumi (るるみ)
Onodera deploys three magic-users to eliminate Kurofuku following the Valkyria Incident. Rie's abilities remain unknown as she dies before demonstrating them. Misaki possesses invisibility limited to her naked body, while Rurumi controls others through voodoo dolls. The group encounters a mobile Kana, preventing Rurumi from attacking her. During a hospital infiltration, Rurumi's harness hatches, creating a monster that consumes her. When Rie mistakes the creature for Rurumi, she lets it devour her out of guilt. Misaki rescues Kana and Kitsuka before Initializer destroys the monster, resulting in Misaki's harness ejection for mission failure.

==== Valkyria ====
Mako Fujisaki (藤崎 真子, Fujisaki Mako)
Voiced by: Mamiko Noto (Japanese); Carli Mosier (English)
Mako, an S-rank hybrid magic-user, possesses eight abilities including teleportation, regeneration, presence detection, and anti-matter manipulation—her most destructive capability. Though four powers remain undocumented, her combat effectiveness is unmatched. Psychologically unstable yet devoted to Chisato (her rescuer from genetic collapse), she claims sisterhood with Neko and acts protectively. After Neko's micro black hole consumes her physical form, Ryouta destroys her remaining Drasil, though she ultimately reunites with Chisato in the afterlife.
Hrist (フリスト)
Hrist, real name (Eri (絵里)), is an SS-rank Valkyria created after Mako's death, becomes Vingulf's most powerful magic-user, surpassing her predecessor. Initially restrained via crucifixion, she escapes using awakened teleportation abilities only to be recaptured. Unlike Mako, she demonstrates compassion by refusing to kill, though Onodera forces her compliance by threatening prolonged witch executions. After attacking the National Diet, Takachiho delivers her to Loki for consumption to enhance his power.

=== Hexenjagd ===
A resistance group meaning "witch hunt" that is built by scientists who defected from the Organization due to the threat that they posed to God himself. Hexenjagd is responsible for the magic-users' escapee.

Miki Neumayer (Miki Noimaiā)
Voiced by: Rina Satō (Japanese); Shelley Calene-Black (English)
Miki, founder of Hexenjagd, contacts Ryouta through Neko's device with the objective of capturing Kotori to destroy her Grane. She declares all magic-users must die, explaining their souls now inhabit alien "Drasils" within their harnesses, with suppressants merely feeding these organisms. In exchange for assistance locating Kotori, she provides death-suppressant ingredients and protocol (as Mizuka predicted). After Kotori's death, Miki honors the agreement by supplying the complete formula, enabling Kogorou to medicate the remaining magic-users.
Initializer (イニシャライザー, Inisharaizā)
Voiced by: Junko Minagawa (Japanese); Meaghan Avocato (English)
Initializer appears as a young boy with unknown origins. His magic-nullification ability requires conscious activation and knowledge of the target's powers, lasting eight seconds except during three-day new moon periods. He can instantly destroy hatched Drasils. A prototype similar to Makina (who calls him "the old man with the defective body"), he predates a more advanced model that passively neutralizes magic, coexisting with Hrist.
Akane (茜)
Voiced by: Yui Kondo (Japanese); Brittany Deans (English)
A former Vingulf researcher who got wounded during Neko's escaping attempt. She gave Neko a package and entrusted her the following mission: "Save the world from utter destruction and ruin". The package contains an alien's fertilized egg and a communication device. Neko later gave the alien sample and device to Ryouta.

=== Supporting characters ===
Kogorou Hashiratani (柱谷 小五郎, Hashiratani Kogorō)
Voiced by: Kentarō Itō (Japanese); Jay Hickman (English)
Kogorou, Ryouta's maternal uncle, is a scientist tasked with reproducing magic-users' medicine. Skeptical of supernatural phenomena until witnessing Kana's foresight and Nanami's death, he previously attended college with Chisato, whom he admired. His examination of an alien fertilized egg leads to research on countering Vingulf. Through JAXA satellite analysis, he traces Vingulf's connection to a Dresden-based institute. Kogorou employs extreme measures against those attempting to claim credit for the alien discovery.
Kitsuka Hatta (八田 結花, Hatta Kikka)
Voiced by: Mariko Honda (Japanese); Christina Kelly (English)
A middle-school student who lives next door to Ryouta that he tutors. Kitsuka has a crush on Ryouta that he is completely oblivious to. She later becomes classmates with Kana when she starts attending middle school and befriends her after learning of her secret. Kitsuka is afraid of swimming but gains courage thanks to Kana. Sometime later, Kitsuka is found to have been taken to Vingulf in means to be Ryouta's Eve of the new world.
Risa Kashiwagi (柏木 リサ, Kashiwagi Risa)
Voiced by: Kana Yūki (Japanese); Nancy Novotny (English)
Ryouta's classmate. She regularly expresses how intelligent Ryouta is, even though he usually was distant from females. Risa befriends Neko the day of her transfer originally due to saving her from drowning and invites her to karaoke. Risa later gets into a car accident, and Hatsuna heals her burned wounds. As the story proceeds, she realizes Neko's mysterious power.
Masashi Takaya (高屋 雅史, Takaya Masashi)
Takaya, Ryouta's classmate, first appears at a maid café staffed by Neko, Kazumi, and Hatsuna. A handsome but aggressive-seeming youth with underlying kindness, he drops out after rumored violent incidents. Upon discovering Hatsuna's secret, he develops affection for her and confesses when learning of her predicted death. His confession accidentally triggers her hatching, though she later revives him after restoration. Despite genuine care, his social ineptitude manifests when he immediately pressures Hatsuna for sexual relations upon dating. He subsequently supports the astronomy club.
Mina Tachibana (橘 美奈, Tachibana Mina)
Mina, Kana's long-lost sister kidnapped a decade prior, investigates Vingulf as a journalist while searching for missing children. She uncovers inconsistencies in media reports about Valkyria's destruction, suspecting a cover-up. With a colleague, she identifies Kurofuku's hospitalization as a Vingulf connection, orchestrating his escape only to lose him. A hospital photo reignites her search until reuniting with Kana at the maid café. They bond over shared memories before joining Ryouta's class trip to Ishigaki Island, where Mina dies shielding Kana from Makina's attack.

== Media ==
=== Manga ===
Written and illustrated by Lynn Okamoto, Brynhildr in the Darkness was serialized in Shueisha's seinen manga magazine Weekly Young Jump from January 26, 2012, to March 31, 2016. Shueisha collected its 181 individual chapters in eighteen tankōbon volumes, released from May 18, 2012, to May 19, 2016. Shueisha began publishing the manga in English on its Manga Million digital platform in 2026.

=== Anime ===
An anime adaptation was announced on November 11, 2013. The anime is directed by Kenichi Imazumi at studio Arms, with Yukinori Kitajima acting as head writer and Hiroaki Kurasu as chief animation director and character designer. The series aired between April 6 and June 29, 2014, on Tokyo MX, and later on ytv, CTV, BS11 and AT-X. For episodes 1–9 the opening is "Brynhildr in the Darkness -Ver. Ejected-" by Nao Tokisawa. From episode 10 onwards, the opening is "Virtue and Vice" by Fear, and Loathing in Las Vegas. The ending song is "Ichiban Boshi" by Risa Taneda, Aya Suzaki, M.A.O, and Azusa Tadokoro.

==== Episodes ====
No.	Title	Original release date
1	"While Waiting For You"; Transliteration: "Kimi o Machinagara" (Japanese: きみを待ちながら)	April 6, 2014
Ryouta Murakami shares a close bond with his childhood friend Kuroneko, who claims aliens exist. During an attempt to prove this, they fall from a dam—Ryouta survives but Kuroneko allegedly dies. Driven by guilt, Ryouta dedicates himself to astronomy, aspiring to join NASA to validate her beliefs. A decade later, Ryouta, now a high-achieving student, encounters Neko Kuroha, a transfer student identical to Kuroneko yet unaware of their past. After witnessing Neko save a drowning classmate through unexplained means, Ryouta grows suspicious of her unusual abilities, including superhuman strength and gaps in basic knowledge. When a mudslide nearly kills him, Neko intervenes, splitting a boulder with supernatural power. She reveals her true nature as a witch, displaying the harness on her neck.
2	"Magician"; Transliteration: "Mahōtsukai" (Japanese: 魔法使い)	April 13, 2014
Neko insists Ryouta keep her witch identity secret. A flashback reveals Kuroneko never took her planned ocean trip with Ryouta. When Neko misses school, Ryouta delivers a pamphlet to her hideout in an abandoned village, observing Self-Defense Force vehicles nearby. Neko explains she enrolled to prevent deaths, having escaped a secret laboratory with other witches after an accident. Inside the hideout, Ryouta meets Kana Tachibana, a paralyzed witch who communicates via keyboard. Kana possesses foresight, revealing the laboratory has captured and executed another witch, Kanade. Though initially reluctant, Kana persuades Neko to return to school. During a subsequent visit, Ryouta brings food and invites Neko on an upcoming field trip.
3	"Death Suppressants"; Transliteration: "Chinshizai" (Japanese: 鎮死剤)	April 20, 2014
Neko returns to school bandaged, alarming Ryouta. He finds her bleeding at the village and administers "Death Suppressants"—essential pills witches must take every 30–35 hours to survive. When the kitchen burns down with their remaining supply, Ryouta uses his photographic memory to recall the drug's identification code and trace its manufacturing location. Relocating Neko and Kana to the observatory, Ryouta learns of Neko's telekinesis ability. They enlist witch Kazumi Schlierenzauer to hack the factory's security system. The laboratory detects their inquiry and dispatches assassin witch Saori. Despite Kana foreseeing Neko's death, Neko infiltrates the factory while Ryouta searches for pills. After reading Neko's letter, Ryouta intervenes, only to witness Saori kill Neko. In despair, he recalls Saori's secondary ability could reverse the situation.
4	"Lost Memories"; Transliteration: "Ushinawareta Kioku" (Japanese: 失われた記憶)	April 27, 2014
Ryouta fatally wounds Saori, forcing her to use time manipulation to reverse their deaths—an act that drains her magic and erases Ryouta's memory of Neko being Kuroneko. Though restrained, Saori escapes but is later ejected by the laboratory, her body dissolving into an amoebic form that Ryouta destroys. After securing the vital pills, Ryouta returns to the observatory where Kazumi and Kana barely survive. With the witches stabilized, Neko joins Ryouta's class trip to the ocean, weeping as if fulfilling a long-held desire. She later provides Ryouta with a communication device and an alien embryo from researcher Akane. As Kazumi transfers into Ryouta's class, laboratory director Chisato Ichijiku is reprimanded for the escaped witches. Meanwhile, new transfer student Kotori Takatori arrives, requesting to join the astronomy club.
5	"Stargazing"; Transliteration: "Tentai Kansoku" (Japanese: 天体観測)	May 4, 2014
Kotori joins the astronomy club, allowing Ryouta to organize their first observation night. Neko unconsciously breaks a table in jealousy over Kazumi's advances, prompting Ryouta to learn her magic use erases memories—explaining her forgotten childhood. During their mountain hike, Neko demonstrates knowledge of constellations, while Kana foresees her death, suspecting Kotori. When confronted, Kotori reveals her teleportation ability but remains ambiguous about her intentions. The group resumes stargazing, their initial disinterest fading upon viewing Saturn's rings through the telescope. The next day, witch Shino contacts them while fleeing Kikako near a lake. Despite Ryouta's objections, Neko and Kotori intervene, only for Kikako to kill Shino with a destructive energy beam.
6	"The Meaning of Her Smile"; Transliteration: "Hohoemi no Riyū" (Japanese: 微笑の理由)	May 11, 2014
Neko engages Kikako in combat, but Ryouta deactivates her harness to prevent memory loss. While Neko distracts Kikako, Kazumi isolates the area through hacking. Ryouta directs Kotori—who had bound herself to a pole—to teleport-swap with Kikako, neutralizing the threat. They later find Kotori bleeding from pill deprivation in a cottage. She reveals her deceased friend Chie sacrificed her own medication to enroll Kotori in school as a final gift. Though prepared to die, Kotori is persuaded to live after sharing the group's remaining pills. During a club outing, Ryouta visits his scientist uncle Kogorō Hashiratani, demonstrating Neko's magic to secure his help in replicating the vital medication.
7	"Fragment of Hope"; Transliteration: "Kibō no Kakera" (Japanese: 希望のかけら)	May 18, 2014
Kogorō agrees to analyze the witches' medicine and alien embryo, though synthesis may require years. The witches express gratitude, with Kana noting Ryouta's affection for Neko. During a karaoke outing, Neko struggles with public singing. Meanwhile, Kotori reveals laboratory origins tied to century-old alien ruins containing apocalyptic threats. Chisato informs superiors that interrogating Kikako confirmed their priority: capturing subject #1107 (Kotori) and retrieving the 'Grane'. In Akihabara, Ryouta acquires computer equipment with Kazumi, who treats the outing as romantic. Activating the communication device, they decode a German message: "Kill the witches now. Only then will we reveal the truth."
8	"The Last Lead"; Transliteration: "Nokosareta Tegakari" (Japanese: 残された手がかり)	May 25, 2014
Ryouta investigates the map location alone after the device's password protection suggests hostile senders. Two black-coated individuals appear where the device activated. Kazumi later analyzes the map at Ryouta's home, propositioning him aggressively before he visits the marked church—now ruined, with an elderly witness confirming its unexplained destruction. Discovering German inscriptions, Ryouta is arrested until Neko and Kotori intervene, disabling the police. They urge collective action. Meanwhile, Kogorō receives updates about the alien embryo, while Kana mocks Kazumi's behavior. Ryouta shares the blood-marked inscription but hesitates to reactivate the device. The laboratory identifies Ryouta as an accomplice to witches #1107 (Kotori) and #7620 (Neko). Chisato dispatches assistant Kurofuku and witch Nanami Tokō to track them.
9	"False Memories"; Transliteration: "Mozō no Kioku" (Japanese: 模造の記憶)	June 1, 2014
Nanami, a memory-manipulating witch, cooperates with Kurofuku in exchange for sweets. After locating Ryouta through Kitsuka, she temporarily erases Kurofuku's awareness of her. Seeking freedom, she lures Ryouta and scans his memories, discovering the observatory witches. Though Ryouta resists her memory alteration due to his photographic memory, Nanami remains skeptical of his offer for independence. The group attempts peaceful reconciliation. At a park, Neko removes her sunglasses to appeal to Nanami as a friend, triggering a memory-altered attack. Neko's sincere address as "friend" prompts Nanami to reverse the manipulation and join them. Meanwhile, Kurofuku regains his full memories of the events.
10	"Proof of Life"; Transliteration: "Ikiteiru Akashi" (Japanese: 生きている証)	June 8, 2014
Kogorō attempts to deactivate Nanami's harness beacon at the observatory, but it triggers before intervention, dissolving her body. To spare the witches grief, Nanami erases their memories of her—preserving only Ryouta and Kogorō's recollection—before manifesting as a consciousness within Ryouta's mind. With only three weeks of pills remaining, the club debates abandoning school until Ryouta reaffirms their desire for normalcy, organizing a beach trip. During finals, Neko scores first, Ryouta second, and Kazumi third. As Neko sings that evening, Ryouta realizes her worsening memory loss and embraces her in distress. Meanwhile, Chisato unleashes Valkyria, an S-rank witch, to locate Kotori (#1107). The deployed A-rank monitoring team is swiftly eliminated.
11	"A Sudden Reunion"; Transliteration: "Totsuzen no Saikai" (Japanese: 突然の再会)	June 15, 2014
Valkyria (Mako Fujisaki) annihilates a police squad with antimatter magic, prompting the witches to strategize evasion. Hatsuna Wakabayashi, having escaped the scene through regeneration, joins the astronomy club after finding them feigning death for protection. She tests Ryouta's reliability by staging a radio tower fall—he rescues her despite knowing her regenerative ability, earning her trust and a public confession kiss, which triggers Neko's jealous destruction of the tower. Kogorō theorizes the witches' melting stems from protease enzymes, potentially accelerating medicine production within a month. Meanwhile, Chisato directs Mako to locate Kotori (#1107). When juice spills reveal Neko's birthmark, Ryouta confirms she is Kuroneko and vows to restore her memories. Their reunion is interrupted by Mako's arrival via helicopter.
11.5	"Much Ado About Nothing"; Transliteration: "Karasawagi" (Japanese: から騒ぎ)	September 24, 2014
Following Hatsuna's confession, Ryouta searches for Neko while Kazumi reacts with jealous frustration. When pressed about his feelings, Ryouta admits only to liking Kuroneko, provoking Kazumi's competitive pursuit. After accidentally tumbling downhill together, Kazumi hallucinates an elaborate rivalry with Hatsuna involving cooking challenges and hot spring endurance tests—all culminating in Neko accidentally crushing her with the observatory telescope. The hallucination breaks when Ryouta performs mouth-to-mouth resuscitation, revealing Kazumi never left the hillside. Neko, witnessing the act, misinterprets it as romantic, reigniting tensions over Ryouta's affections.
12	"Witch Hunt"; Transliteration: "Majogari" (Japanese: 魔女狩り)	June 22, 2014
Mako and Chisato arrive at the observatory demanding Kotori (#1107). When Ryouta's distraction fails, Mako bisects Hatsuna. Chisato declares B-rank witches expendable and orders Neko's execution, but Ryouta intercepts the attack. In a near-death vision, Nanami reveals Neko was once an S-rank witch; reactivating her power requires pressing her harness' top button—a fatal risk for Ryouta. Hexenjagd, a resistance group, intervenes using Ryouta's activated device to nullify Mako's magic. Chisato escapes with Kotori via teleportation. Hatsuna revives Ryouta through healing but melts afterward. Hexenjagd explains the witches' Drasils will eventually hatch as monsters, and Kotori's Grane could annihilate humanity. At the lake, Chisato confesses implanting his deceased sister Rena's consciousness into Kotori. When Kotori's harness activates, it emits "Ain Soph Aur"—a planetary-scale light threatening global destruction.
13	"Things to Protect"; Transliteration: "Mamoritai Mono" (Japanese: 守リたいもの)	June 29, 2014
As "Ain Soph Aur" engulfs Earth, Ryouta, Neko, and Kazumi attempt to rescue Kotori, though Neko and Kazumi incapacitate Ryouta to protect him. Kotori self-ejects her harness to halt the phenomenon, sacrificing herself to preserve others' happiness. Mako bisects Kazumi but spares Neko, recognizing her as a sister. Ryouta reaches Kotori's melting form; her final words plead for Chisato's redemption and express contentment. Meanwhile, Kana intervenes by activating her harness' top button, sacrificing her foresight for mobility. Neko follows suit, regaining her full power and memories as Kuroneko. She counters Mako's antimatter assault with a barrier until Hexenjagd's interference forces Mako's retreat. After Chisato dies shielding Mako, she attempts global annihilation with antimatter. Neko eradicates her using a micro black hole but loses all memories again from overexertion. Post-conflict, Kogorō secures the pill formula, allowing the witches to resume school life. The astronomy club observes the Summer Triangle, with Ryouta guiding the amnesic Neko.

== Reception ==
Nicole MacLean of THEM Anime Reviews panned the series, finding it inferior to Okamoto's Elfen Lied due to overlapping themes. She criticized its "shoddy" story and underdeveloped characters. She further criticized its excessive reliance on harem tropes, arguing they undermined its sci-fi/horror premise.
