= Parallel Paradise =

Japanese manga series by Lynn Okamoto

- Cover of the first manga volume

パラレルパラダイス (Parareru Paradaisu)
- Genre: Erotic fantasy; Isekai; Sword and sorcery
- Manga
- Written by: Lynn Okamoto
- Published by: Kodansha
- English publisher: NA: Seven Seas Entertainment
- Imprint: Young Magazine KC
- Magazine: Weekly Young Magazine
- Original run: March 18, 2017 – present
- Volumes: 33
- icon

Parallel Paradise (Japanese: パラレルパラダイス, Hepburn: Parareru Paradaisu) is a Japanese manga series written and illustrated by Lynn Okamoto. It has been serialized in Kodansha's seinen manga magazine Weekly Young Magazine since March 2017.

In North America, the manga has been licensed for an English language release by Seven Seas Entertainment in August 2019.

== Plot ==
Youta Tada is an ordinary high school student who holds deep feelings for his childhood friend. One day during class, he is suddenly attacked and seemingly killed by a mysterious scarecrow-like being. Youta then wakes up and finds himself in an alternate world with castles, dragons and two colored moons in a purple sky. Here he meets paladin girl Lumi and a three-legged bird named Genius and quickly learns that he got into a women-only world where he is the first man that appeared in centuries. Thanks to that, women in this world have absolutely no resistance towards him and his single touch makes Lumi incredibly aroused. Genius then orders him to mate with all the girls in this fantastical world.

== Characters ==
Youta Tada (太多 陽太, Tada Yōta)
An ordinary high school student who holds deep feelings for his childhood friend. He is pretty skilled in kendo, which he learned on a suggestion of his father.
Lumi (ルーミ, Rūmi)
A paladin of the Caesar Kingdom. She is not very smart, but very kind and after their first encounter, she helps Youta to hide his identity before others. She is a member of The Quintet group that protects the city of Meese.
Genius (ジーニアス, Jīniasu)
A little bird with three legs. According to Lumi, he is God. He explains and reveals various secrets of an alternate world to Youta.
Lilia (リリア, Riria)
Strongest Archer of the Caesar Kingdom. She appears as a quiet diligent girl. But actually, she is very perverted and for a long time dreams about mating with a man. She is a member of The Quintet group that protects the city of Meese.
Misaki (ミサキ, Misaki)
The Strider. She is a member of The Quintet group that protects the city of Meese.
Momo (もも, Momo)
The Lancer. She is a member of The Quintet group that protects the city of Meese. Later, she becomes the witch.
Haru (ハル, Haru)
The Guardian. She is a member of The Quintet group that protects the city of Meese.
Mona (モナ, Mona) and Lisa (リザ, Riza)
A pair of twins, that appear in the city of Meese. They are brutally honest.
Sayuri (サユリ, Sayuri)
An elf that runs a store where she sell various mysterious goods.
Nishina (仁科, Nishina)
Youta's childhood friend for which he holds deep feelings.

== Publication ==
Written and illustrated by Lynn Okamoto, Parallel Paradise started in Kodansha's seinen manga magazine Weekly Young Magazine on March 18, 2017. In July 2022, it was announced that the manga was nearing its climax. Kodansha has compiled its chapters into individual tankōbon volumes. The first volume was published on August 4, 2017. As of November 6, 2026, 33 volumes have been released.

The manga is licensed for an English release in North America by Seven Seas Entertainment. It is being released under its Ghost Ship imprint, and the first volume was published on March 31, 2020.

A short story, titled Nure Tenaite Nokezotte (ぬれて ないて のけぞって; lit. 'Get Wet, Cry, Bend Over'), written by Kyōsuke Kanzaki, was included in a booklet titled Parallel Booklet II, bundled with the special edition of the manga's second volume, released on November 17, 2017.

== Reception ==
In July 2020, the manga became one of seven titles to be removed from Books Kinokuniya in Australia for claims of promoting child pornography.
