= Mengo Yokoyari =

Japanese manga artist (born 1998)

- 横槍メンゴ
- Born: February 27, 1988 (age 38); Mie Prefecture, Japan
- Occupation: Manga artist
- Known for: Scum's Wish, Oshi no Ko

Mengo Yokoyari (横槍 メンゴ, Yokoyari Mengo; born February 27, 1988) is a Japanese manga artist. She debuted as an adult manga artist in 2009.

== Works ==
- Haruwaka (はるわか) (2010–2012)
- Mokkai Shiyo? (もっかいしよ ?) (2011)
- Kimi wa Midara na Boku no Joō (君は淫らな僕の女王) (2012–2017, story by Lynn Okamoto)
- Scum's Wish (クズの本懐) (2012–2017)
- Mega Heart (めがはーと) (2013–2017)
- Retort Pouch! (レトルトパウチ！) (2014–2018)
- Isshō Sukitte Yuttajan (一生好きってゆったじゃん) (2018–2020, short stories compilation)
- Oshi no Ko (【推しの子】) (2020–2024, story by Aka Akasaka)

=== Specials and one shots ===
- I Am a Hero short story (2016) (included on I Am a Hero Official Anthology: 8 Tales of the ZQN (アイアムアヒーロー 公式アンソロジーコミック8))
- Fuyu Kitari naba, (ふゆきたりなば、) (2013) (included as the sixth and final story on volume 2 of Cigarette Anthology (シガレットアンソロジー))
