= Lynn Okamoto =

Japanese manga artist

- 岡本 倫
- Born: 6 January 1971 (age 55); Wakayama Prefecture, Japan
- Occupation: Manga artist
- Known for: Elfen Lied
- Website: www.okamoto.tv

Lynn Okamoto (岡本 倫, Okamoto Rin) is a Japanese manga artist and a former employee of Bandai and Arc System Works. His most famous work is the series Elfen Lied which was adapted into a 13-episode anime series by the studio Arms.

== Works ==
- Elfen Lied (エルフェンリート, Erufen Rīto) (2002–2005, serialized in Weekly Young Jump, Shueisha)
- Tanpenshū Flip Flap (2008 Shueisha)
  - Elfen Lied (2000, short story)
  - Digitopolis (デジトポリス, Dejitoporisu)
  - MOL
  - Memoria (メモリア)
  - Carriera
  - Registrar (レジストラ, Rejisutora)
  - Allumage
  - Lime Yellow
  - Flip Flap
- Nononono (ノノノノ) (2007–2010, serialized in Weekly Young Jump, Shueisha)
- Brynhildr in the Darkness (極黒のブリュンヒルデ, Gokukoku no Buryunhirude) (2012–2016, serialized in Weekly Young Jump, Shueisha)
- Kimi wa Midara na Boku no Joō (君は淫らな僕の女王) (2012–2017, art by Mengo Yokoyari)
- Parallel Paradise (パラレルパラダイス, Parareru Paradaisu) (2017–ongoing, serialized in Weekly Young Magazine, Kodansha)

== Legacy ==
The asteroid 49382 Lynnokamoto (1998 XG5) was named after him.
