= Japan Media Arts Festival =

Japanese festival, Award

- Awarded for: "Outstanding works in the four divisions of Art, Entertainment, Animation, and Manga"
- Country: Japan
- Presented by: Agency for Cultural Affairs of Japan
- First award: 1997
- Final award: 2022
- Website: j-mediaarts.jp

The Japan Media Arts Festival was an annual festival held since 1997 by Japan's Agency for Cultural Affairs. The festival begins with an open competition and culminates with the awarding of several prizes and an exhibition.

Based on judging by a jury of artistic peers, awards are given in four categories: Art (formerly called Non-Interactive Digital Art), Entertainment (formerly called Interactive Art; including video games and websites), animation, and manga. Within each category, one Grand Prize, four Excellence Prizes, and (since 2002) one Encouragement Prize are awarded. Other outstanding works, are selected by the Jury as Jury Selections.

The winning works of the four categories will receive a certificate, a trophy and a cash prize.

== Digital Art (Non-Interactive Art) awards ==
| Year | Grand Prize | Excellence Prizes | Encouragement Prize |
|---|---|---|---|
| 1997 (1st) | "Soul Blade" Opening Movie | Scene#97 -Generated After-; Daisuki Me; SMAP×SMAP Special Effects in the Tribute Songs; hana | n/a |
| 1998 (2nd) | Tokitama Hustle (CG moving picture) | REMtv (CG moving picture); Garahina (CG moving picture); Silent Hill (CG moving picture); Within the Cry of the Red Night (CG moving picture) | n/a |
| 1999 (3rd) | The Diverting History of Mechanical Fellows (CG still picture, solid) | Tall Small Stories (CG moving picture); Revelation Lugia (CG moving picture); Tekkon Kinkreet (CG moving picture); Tatsumi HIYAMA3EXHIBITION (CG still image) | n/a |
| 2000 (4th) | 1 (CG moving picture) | Csoda Pok (wonder spider) (CG moving picture); Garden of the metal (CG moving picture); Avalon (movie/CG moving picture); The nostalgic 21st century (CG moving picture) | n/a |
| 2001 (5th) | Anjyu (CG moving picture) | Insanity (CG still picture); After Image (CG still picture); FADE into WHITE #3 (CG moving picture); Beauty Kit (CG moving picture) | n/a |
| 2002 (6th) | TextArc print:Alice's Adventure in Wonderland (CG still picture) | I AGAINST I (CG still picture); Prize Re-typo "E""A""R""N" (CG still picture); Justice Runners(CG moving picture); Mustafrog and NINJA bunny (CG moving picture) | FISHER MAN (CG moving picture) |

== Digital Art (Interactive Art) awards ==
| Year | Grand Prize | Excellence Prizes | Encouragement Prize |
|---|---|---|---|
| 1997 (1st) | Kage | Final Fantasy VII; Intelligent Qube; Wanna be a Ruby melting in the sky (movie); image dive Site | n/a |
| 1998 (2nd) | The Legend of Zelda: Ocarina of Time | Metal Gear Solid; One-line.com Project; Cluster Works; Net Rezonator | n/a |
| 1999 (3rd) | AIBO, model ERS-110 | Maywa Denki Live Performance; motion dive2; Seaman; Earth from Above | n/a |
| 2000 (4th) | Dragon Warrior VII | Shenmue; Stand-up Comedy Simulation; Vectrial Elevation, Relational Architectecture; Forest of Thoughts | n/a |
| 2001 (5th) | Protrude, Flow | Pikmin; Floating Eye; Contact Water; J-PHONE Sky Pavilion | n/a |
| 2002 (6th) | Social Mobiles | CamCamtime; Course; type R; His Master's Voice | Youkai Yamiwarashi |

== Art awards ==
| Year | Grand Prize | Excellence Prizes | Encouragement Prize (2003–2010) / New Face Award (since 2011) | Social Impact Award (since 2020) |
|---|---|---|---|---|
| 2003 (7th) | Digital Gadgets #6,8,9 (interactive art) | Panorama Ball & Zerograph -Another story of media evolution (still image); three (web); E-BABY (moving picture CG); Venus Villosa (installation) | Tracks of Blue | n/a |
| 2004 (8th) | 3 minutes2 (installation) | Sky Ear (interactive art); GLOBAL BEARING (interactive art); OÏO (visual image); z reactor (visual image) | life-size (still image) | n/a |
| 2005 (9th) | Khronos Projector (Interactive) | Six String Sonics, The (interactive); Spyglass (installation); Gate vision (visual image); Anima (visual image) | Conspiratio (interactive) | n/a |
| 2006 (10th) | Imaginary・Numbers 2006 (installation) | ×man vibration (interactive art); OLE Coordinate System (interactive art); front (installation); MediaFlies (installation) | Sagrada Familia Project (still image) | n/a |
| 2007 (11th) | nijuman no borei (200000 phantoms) (visual image) | Se Mi Sei Vicino (If you are close to me) (interactive art); BYU-BYU-View (interactive art); "Camera Lucida: Sonochemical Observatory" (installation); ISSEY MIYAKE A-POC INSIDE. (visual image) | Super Smile (visual image) | n/a |
| 2008 (12th) | Oups! (installation) | Touched Echo (interactive); Touch the Invisibles (interactive); Moment-performative wandering (visual image); OUTSIDE (still image) | insider''||outsider (installation) | n/a |
| 2009 (13th) | Growth Modeling Device (Installation) | Mr. Lee Experiment (Interactive); Nemo Observatorium (Installation); SEKILALA (Visual Image); Braun Tube Jazz Band (Performance) | F - Void Sample (Installation) | n/a |
| 2010 (14th) | Cycloïd-E (Sound sculpture) | The Tenth Sentiment; The EyeWriter; NIGHT LESS; The Men In Grey | Succubus | n/a |
| 2011 (15th) | plain voices, Yoshihiro Yamamoto | particles, Daito Manabe, Motoi Ishibashi; The Saddest Day of My Youth, Brian Alfred; Tsunagaru-TENKI, Yoshiyuki Katayama; BLA BLA, Vincent Morisset | Monkey Business, Ralph Kistler, Jan Sieber; Senseless Drawing Bot, So Kanno, Takahiro Yamaguchi; Himatsubushi, Hideharu Ueki | n/a |
| 2012 (16th) | Pendulum Choir, Cod.Act (Michel Décosterd, André Décosterd) | Desire of Codes, Seiko Mikami; Between Yesterday & Tomorrow, SOL CHORD (Shinjiro Maeda, Rina Okazawa); Bye Buy, Neil Bryant; On Pause, Mikhail Zheleznikov | Outback and Beyond, Grayson Cooke, Mike Cooper; Species series, Wonbin Yang; Strata #4, Quayola | n/a |
| 2013 (17th) | crt mgn, Carsten Nicolai | the blank to overcome, Soichiro Mihara; Dronestagram, James Bridle; Situation Rooms, Rimini Protokoll; The Big Atlas of LA Pools, Benedikt Gross | Learn to be a Machine | DistantObject #1, Lau Hochi; Maquila Region 4, Amor Munoz; The SKOR Codex, La Societe Anonyme | n/a |
| 2014 (18th) | (no award) | This may not be a movie, Kazuhiro Goshima; Sensing streams – invisible, inaudible, Ryuichi Sakamoto, Daito Manabe; Drone Survival Guide, Ruben Peter; Nyloïd, Cod.Act (Michel Décosterd, André Décosterd); "patrinia yellow" for Clarinet and Computer, Satoshi Fukushima | The Tale of Tehrangeles, Anahita Razmi; Symbiotic Machine, Ivan Henriques; Temps mort / Idle times – dinner scene, Alex Verhaest | n/a |
| 2015 (19th) | 50 Shades of Grey, Bryan Chung Wai Ching | The sound of empty space, Adam Basanta; Ultraorbism, Marcel·lí Antúnez Roca; Wutbürger, KASUGA (Andreas Lutz / Christoph Grünberger); (Im)possible Baby, Case 01: Asako & Moriga, Ai Hasegawa | Sando, Takaaki Yamamoto; Communication with the Future – The Petroglyphomat, Lorenz Potthast; Gill & Gill, Louis-Jack Horton-Stephens | n/a |
| 2017 (20th) | Interface I, Ralf Baecker | COLONY, Yukihiro Yoshihara; Alter, "Alter" Production Team (Hiroshi Ishiguro / Takashi Ikegami, Representatives); Jller, Benjamin Maus / Prokop Bartoníček; The Living Language Project, Ori Elisar | You would come back there to see me again the following day., Michiko Tsuda; DCT: SYPHONING. The 1000000th interval., Rosa Menkman; The Wall, Nina Kurtela | n/a |
| 2018 (21st) | Interstices / Opus I - Opus II, Haythem Zakaria | Avatars, So Kanno / yang02; Rapid biography in a society of evolutionary lovers, Unemi Tatsuo / Daniel Bisig; Datum Point, Orikasa Ryo; Language Producing Factory, Dai Furen | I'm In The Computer Memory!, Aida Torajiro; Panderer (Seventeen Seconds), Gary Setzer; The Dither is Naked, Yano | n/a |
| 2019 (22nd) | Pulses/Grains/Phase/Moiré, Ken Furudate | Culturing 'Paper'cut, Hideo Iwasaki; datum, Norimichi Hirakawa; discrete figures, Daito Manabe, Motoi Ishibashi, MIKIKO, Elevenplay; Lasermice, So Kanno | SPARE (not mine), Jonathan Fletcher Moore; Total Tolstoy, Andrey Chugunov; watage, (euglena) | n/a |
| 2020 (23rd) | [ir]reverent: Miracles on Demand, Adam W. Brown | between #4 Black Aura, Hideo Iwasaki; Ferriscope, Bull.Miletic; Soundform No. 1, Natura Machina; Two Hundred and Seventy, Nils Volker | drawhearts, Sebastian Wolf (web); Latent Space, Marian Essl alias MONOCOLOR; Lenna, Hosoi Miyu | SOMEONE, Lauren Lee McCarthy |
| 2021(24th) | Prometheus Bound, Meiro Koizumi | Acqua Alta – Crossing the mirror, Adrien M & Claire B; Bricolage, Nathan THOMPSON / Guy BEN-ARY / Sebastian DIECKE; Sea, See, She – To you, who is yet to come, See by Your Ears (evala, Representative); TH-42PH10EK x 5, Stefan TIEFENGRABER | The reluming apparatus, Hayate Kobayashi; Ether – liquid mirror, Kaito Sakuma; VOX-AUTOPOIESIS V -Mutual-, Chiku Komiya | Google Maps Hacks, Simon WECKERT |
| 2022(25th) | Sun and Moon Room, "Sun and Moon Room" Production Team | Yamahyo Crossing, Shota Yamauchi; The Square Makes It Through, Masaya Ishikawa / Hiroshi Sugihara / Hiroaki Nakaji / Campbell Aregenzio / Shohei Takei; Augmented Shadow – Inside, Joon Yong Moon; mEat me, Theresa Schubert | Projection for the next three thousand years, Miki Hirase; The Transparency of Randomness, Mathias Gartner / Vera Tolazzi; Uber Existence, Shin Hanagata | Bio Sculpture, Keio SFC Hiroya Tanaka Lab. + METACITY (Ryuta Aoki, Representative) |

== Entertainment awards ==
| Year | Grand Prize | Excellence Prizes | Encouragement Prize (2003–2010) / New Face Award (since 2011) |
|---|---|---|---|
| 2003 (7th) | Final Fantasy Crystal Chronicles | EyeToy: Play; Ski Jumping Pair Official DVD; Pokemotion; THEgarden | atMOS: Self-Packaging Movie |
| 2004 (8th) | WarioWare: Twisted! | Alice in Vivaldi's Four Seasons; Onimusha 3 Opening Cinematics; YKK AP Evolution | Cherry-Clouds |
| 2005 (9th) | Flipbook!, Khronos Projector | Nintendogs; "Wamono" by Hifana (music video); Mitsui Fudosan Shibaura Island 3LDK Image Movie; Vodafone Design File | Incompatible Block |
| 2006 (10th) | Ōkami | Rhythm Tengoku; Shaberu! DS Oryouri Navi; "Fit Song" by Cornelius (music video); Rediscovery Map Nippon | Amagatana |
| 2007 (11th) | Wii Sports | Metal Gear Solid 4: Guns of the Patriots; Monster Hunter Freedom 2; Have You Seen It? (short movie); Daydream | The moon princess being smelled by ~ Japanese old tales remix ~ (picture book) |
| 2008 (12th) | Tenori-On (electronic musical instrument) | Wii Fit; Exhibition Transform Yourself (exhibition); Carbon Footprint (visual image); FONTPARK 2.0 | Gyorol (web) |
| 2009 (13th) | Hibi No Neiro (Tone of Everyday) | Naruto: Ultimate Ninja Storm; "Fake It!" / Denki Groove (music video); Love Distance; ScoreLight | Asahi Art Festival |
| 2010 (14th) | IS Parade | echochrome ii; "Aruku Around" by Sakanaction (music video); "Natsu o Matteimashita" by Amazarashi (music video); Tabio Slide Show | iPad magic |
| 2011 (15th) | Space Balloon Project, Tsubasa Oyagi, Kempei Baba, Takeshi Nozoe, John Powell | Berobero, Hideyuki Tanaka; Phase Transition-ish Apparatus, Yuichiro Katsumoto; The Museum of Me, Koichiro Tanaka, Eiji Tanigawa, Seiichi Saito, Masanori Sakamoto, Ken Murayama; Song of Anagura Missing Researchers & their Remaining Devices, Hiroshi Inukai, Ryosuke Shibasaki, Kazutoshi Iida, Ichiro Ariyama, Kenji Sasajima, Shinya Kamuro | Digital Warrior Sanjigen, Kaito Nakamura; Hietsuki Bushi, Omodaka; Rhythmushi, Tsubasa Naruse |
| 2012 (16th) | Perfume "Global Site Project", Daito Manabe, Mikiko, Yasutaka Nakata, Satoshi Horii, Hiroyasu Kimura | The Warped Forest, Shunichiro Miki; Smart Trashbox, Minoru Kurata; Suidobashi Heavy Industry "KURATAS", Kogoro Kurata, Wataru Yoshizaki; Gravity Daze, Keiichiro Toyama (Gravity Daze Team) | Whatever Button, IDPW; NAGANO Ryo "HAJIMEYOU", Fuyu Arai; Haisuinonasa "Dynamics of the Subway", Keita Onishi |
| 2013 (17th) | Sound of Honda / Ayrton Senna 1989, Kaoru Sugano, Sotaro Yasumochi, Yu Orai, Nadya Kirillova, Kyoko Yonezawa, Kosai Sekine, Taeji Sawai, Daito Manabe | Sports Time Machine, Hiroshi Inukai, Ryoko Ando; Travis "Moving", Tom Wrigglesworth, Matt Robinson; Fantasy Captured in Plastic Models: A Desk Diorama, Hiroto Ikeuchi; The Burning Buddha Man, Ujicha | ZEZEHIHI, Daisuke Tsuda; Yakenohara "RELAXIN", Saigo No Shudan (Ayumu Arisaka, Mai Oita, Ren Kohata); TorqueL prototype 2013.03 @ E3, Nanmo (Takayuki Yanagihara) |
| 2014 (18th) | Ingress, Google's Niantic Labs (John Hanke, Founder) | Noramoji project, Rintaro Shimohama, Naoki Nishimura, Shinya Wakaoka; handii, Genta Kondo, Hiroshi Yamaura, Tetsuya Konishi; Kintsugi, APOTROPIA (Antonella Mignone, Cristiano Panepuccia); 3RD, Hedwig Heinsman, Niki Smit, Simon van der Linden | Auto-Complain, Florian Born; Slime Synthesizer, Dorita / Airgarage lab (Naofumi Kawauchi, Yumi Sasaki); 5D ARCHIVE DEPT., Kohichi Katsuki |
| 2015 (19th) | Best way for counting numbers, Yuichi Kishino | Dark Echo, Jesse Ringrose / Jason Ennis; Drawing Operations Unit: Generation 1, Sougwen Chung; Solar Pink Pong, Assocreation / Daylight Media Lab; Thumper, Marc Flury / Brian Gibson | hottamaru days, Nao Yoshigai; Black Death, Christian Werner / Isabelle Buckow; '"EYE" by group inou (music video), Baku Hashimoto / Katsuki Nogami |
| 2017 (20th) | Shin Godzilla, Hideaki Anno / Shinji Higuchi | Digital Shaman Project, Etsuko Ichihara; NO SALT RESTAURANT, Kohei Kawasaki / Tomohiko Nakano/ Hiromi Nakamura/. Toshiyuki Hashimoto / Kazuki Utagawa / Wataru Amano; Pokémon GO, "Pokémon Go" Production Team (Tatsuo Nomura, Representative); Unlimited Corridor, "Unlimited Corridor" Project Team (Keigo Matsumoto, Representative) | "MUSIC VIDEO" by okazakitaiiku (music video), okazakitaiiku / Sushi-kun; ObOrO, Ryo Kishi; RADIX | ORGANISM/APPARATUS, Marcel Bückner / Tim Heinze / Richard Oeckel / Lorenz Potthast / Moritz Richartz |
| 2018 (21st) | The Last Guardian, Fumito Ueda | Foresta Lumina; Industrial JP; PaintsChainer, Yonetsuji Taizan; Pechat, Ono Naoki | The Blind Fish, Ishikawa Yasuaki / Mikaduki Hutatsu / Kondou Keishi; Dust, Mária Júdová / Andrej Boleslavský; MetaLimbs, Sasaki Tomoya / Mhd Yamen Saraiji |
| 2019 (22nd) | Chico Will Scold You!, "Chico Will Scold You!" Production Team | Kabukicho Detective Seven, Team Detective7 (Takao Kato, Takumi Nishizawa, Masataka Hirai, Nobu Horita, Tatsuro Iwamoto); LINNÉ LENS, "LINNÉ LENS" Production team (Kenichi Sugimoto (representative)); Reframe, Perfume, Perfume+Reframe Production Team (MIKIKO (representative), Daito Manabe, Ishibashi Motoi); TikTok, "Tik Tok" Japan team | The Bamboo Princess, Wednesday Campanella, Kento Yamada; Spring, Ayumi Omori; Pixel Ripped 1989, Ana Ribeiro, Carlo Caputo, Julia Lemos, Leonardo Batelli, William Rodriguez |
| 2020 (23rd) | Shadows as Athletes, Masahiko Sato, Masashi Sato, Masaya Ishikawa, Tomoko Kaizuka | Ogiri AI and Chihara-Engineer, "Ogiri AI and Chihara-Engineer" Production Team (Daisuke Takenouchi (representative)); New Logos Order, "New Logos Order" Direction Team (Hiromu Akita, Amazarashi (representative)); CellMate, Solmaz Etemad; Sekiro: Shadows Die Twice, Sekiro Development Team (Hidetaka Miyazaki (representative)) | TON-TON VOICE SUMO, "TON-TON VOICE SUMO" Production Team (Atsushi Otaki (representative)); Buddience, Takuta Akamatsu, Takuya Tsuyuki, Kengo Tatsuzawa, Fuya Ozaki; PickHits, Azumi Maekawa, Seito Matsubara |

== Animation awards ==
| Year | Grand Prize | Excellence Prizes | Encouragement Prize/New Face Award | Social Impact Award |
|---|---|---|---|---|
| 1997 (1st) | Princess Mononoke | Mini Cartoon ~Knyacki~; Donguri's House; The Bugs; Neon Genesis Evangelion | n/a | n/a |
| 1998 (2nd) | Glassy Ocean | Kaidohryoku REAL; Serial Experiments Lain; Believe in It; Doraemon: Nobita's South Sea Adventure | n/a | n/a |
| 1999 (3rd) | The Old Man and the Sea | Ojarumaru 2; Mother; TYO Story; My Neighbors the Yamadas | n/a | n/a |
| 2000 (4th) | Blood: The Last Vampire | Luz; Hidamari no Ki; TarePanda; S.O.S | n/a | n/a |
| 2001 (5th) | Spirited Away and Millennium Actress (tie) | Nostalgia; Cat Soup | n/a | n/a |
| 2002 (6th) | Crayon Shin-chan: The Storm Called: The Battle of the Warring States | Mt. Head; Magical Shopping Arcade Abenobashi; Ghost in the Shell: Stand Alone Complex; The Cat Returns | "The Evening Traveling" | n/a |
| 2003 (7th) | Winter Days | Tokyo Godfathers; Mr. Stain on Junk Alley; Tsuneo Gōda's Komaneko; Visions of Frank | Hoshi no Ko | n/a |
| 2004 (8th) | Mind Game | Howl's Moving Castle; Grrl Power!; ACIDMAN short film "SAI (Part 1)/Mawaru, Meguru, Sono Kaku e"; Birthday Boy | DREAM | n/a |
| 2005 (9th) | Flow | The Book of the Dead; Kamichu!; flowery; Kōji Yamamura's The Old Crocodile | seasons | n/a |
| 2006 (10th) | The Girl Who Leapt Through Time | Bloomed Words; A Country Between the World; My Love; PIKA PIKA | Vladimir Bellini's La grua y la jirafa | n/a |
| 2007 (11th) | Summer Days with Coo | Ukkari Pénélope; Gurren Lagann; Dennō Coil; Franz Kafka's A Country Doctor | ushi-nichi | n/a |
| 2008 (12th) | La Maison en petits cubes | Kaiba; Dreams; KUDAN; Kōji Yamamura's A Child's Metaphysics' | ALGOL | n/a |
| 2009 (13th) | Summer Wars | Jiří Barta's In the Attic; Tokyo Magnitude 8.0; The Cable Car; ELEMI' | ANIMAL DANCE | n/a |
| 2010 (14th) | The Tatami Galaxy | Colorful; Mai Mai Miracle; Fumiko's Confession; In a pig's eye | The Wonder Hospital | n/a |
| 2011 (15th) | Puella Magi Madoka Magica | Legend of the Millennium Dragon; A Letter to Momo; Muybridge's Strings; Folksongs & Ballads | Rabenjunge | n/a |
| 2012 (16th) | Combustible | Asura; Wolf Children Ame and Yuki; The Great Rabbit; The Life of Budori Gusuko | Futon; Lupin III: The Woman Called Fujiko Mine; Oh Willy... | n/a |
| 2013 (17th) | Approved for Adoption | The Eccentric Family; Golden Time; Patema Inverted; Evangelion: 3.33 You Can (Not) Redo. | YOKOSOBOKUDESU Selection; Airy Me; While the Crow Weeps | n/a |
| 2014 (18th) | The Wound | Crayon Shin-chan: Serious Battle! Robot Dad Strikes Back; Giovanni's Island; Padre; The Sense of Touch | My Milk Cup Cow; Tamako Love Story; Man on the Chair | n/a |
| 2015 (19th) | Rhizome | The Case of Hana & Alice; Yùl and the Snake; My Home; Isand (The Master) | Deux Amis; Chulyen, a Crow's tale; Typhoon Noruda | n/a |
| 2017 (20th) | Your Name | A Silent Voice; Boy and the World; A Love Story, Anushka Kishani Nanayakkara; Among the black waves, Anna Budanova | Moom, Daisuke Tsutsumi / Robert Kondo; Have Dreamed Of You So Much, Emma Vakarelova; Rebellious, Arturo and Roy Ambriz | n/a |
| 2018 (21st) | In This Corner of the World, Katabuchi Sunao; Lu over the Wall, Yuasa Masaaki | Harmonia feat. Makoto, Otani Tarafu; Cocolors, Yokoshima Toshihisa; Negative Space, Kuwahata Ru / Max Porter | The Great Passage, Kuroyanagi Toshimasa; The First Thunder, Anastasia Melikhova; Yin, Nicolas Fong | n/a |
| 2019 (22nd) | La Chute, Boris Labbé | The Girl Without Hands, Sebastien Laudenbach; Dragon Pilot: Hisone and Masotan, Shinji Higuchi; Penguin Highway, Hiroyasu Ishida; Okko's Inn, Kitaro Kosaka | Invisible, Akihiko Yamashita; Am I a Wolf?, Amir Houshang Moein; The Little Ship, Anastasia Makhlina | n/a |
| 2020 (23rd) | Children of the Sea, Watanabe Ayumu | A Japanese Boy Who Draws, Kawajiri Masanao; Gon, the Little Fox, Yashiro Takeshi; Long Way North, Remi Chayé; Nettle Head, Paul E. Cabon | Wandering Mouse, Tsukiji Nohara; Daughter, Daria Kascheeva; Elephant in the Bath House, Cheng Jialin | Weathering with You, Shinkai |
| 2021 (24th) | Keep Your Hands Off Eizouken!, Yuasa Masaaki | Violet Evergarden: The Movie, Ishidate Taichi; A Whisker Away, Sato Junichi, Shibayama Tomotaka; Marona's Fantastic Tale, Anca Damian; Grey to Green, Marcos Sánchez | The Man on the Shore, Osaza Daisuke, Morishige Hikaru; The Mark of Emi, Furukawahara Momoka; À la mer poussèire, Héloïse Ferlay | Haze Haseru Haterumade, Waboku |
| 2022 (25th) | The Fourth Wall, Mahboobeh Kalaee | Dozens of Norths, Yamamura Kji; Fortune Favors Lady Nikuko, Watanabe Ayumu, Akashiya Sanma; Letter to a Pig, Tal Kantor; Sonny Boy, Natsume Shingo | Odd Taxi, Konomoto Kazuya, Kinoshita Baku; A Bite of Bone, Yano Honami; Yallah!, Nayla Nassar, Edouard Pitula, Renaud de Saint Albin, Cécile Adant, Anaïs Sassatelli | Pui Pui Molcar, Misato |

== Manga awards ==
| Year | Grand Prize | Excellence Prizes | Encouragement Prize/New Face Award | Social Impact Award |
|---|---|---|---|---|
| 1997 (1st) | The Manga Classics of Japan (22 artists) | Seirei Tsukai Erementarā, Takeshi Okazaki; Blade of the Immortal, Hiroaki Samura; Azumi, Yū Koyama; Monster, Naoki Urasawa | n/a | n/a |
| 1998 (2nd) | Sakamoto Ryōma, Hiroshi Kurogane | Shindō (The Prodigy), Akira Sasō; Firefighter! Daigo of Fire Company M, Masahito Soda; Gon, Masashi Tanaka; Ron, Motoka Murakami | n/a | n/a |
| 1999 (3rd) | I'm Home, Kei Ishizaka | All Nude, Shinichi Sugimura; Kokuritsu Hakubutsukan Monogatari, Jirō Okazaki; Onaji Getsu o Miteiru, Seiki Tsuchida; Harukana Machi e, Jiro Taniguchi | n/a | n/a |
| 2000 (4th) | Vagabond, Takehiko Inoue (art) and Eiji Yoshikawa (original story) | Ōdō no Inu, Yoshikazu Yasuhiko; Massuguni-ikō, Kira; Paji, Takashi Murakami; Tasogare Ryūseigun, Kenshi Hirokane | n/a | n/a |
| 2001 (5th) | F-shiteki nichijō, Yōji Fukuyama | Real, Takehiko Inoue; Viva, Chef!, JAPUNCH; Kamigami no Itadaki, Baku Yumemakura and Jiro Taniguchi; Kurosawa / Blazing Movie Director: Akira Kurosawa biography, Masahiro Sonomura | n/a | n/a |
| 2002 (6th) | Sexy Voice and Robo, Iou Kuroda | Ōzukami Genji Monogatari Maro, n?, Yoshihiro Koizumi; Taishi Kakka no Ryōrinin, Mitsuru Nishimura (story) and Hiroshi Kawasumi (art); 20th Century Boys, Naoki Urasawa; Say Hello to Black Jack, Shūhō Satō | Naze Hakase wa Okotte Iru no ka, Isao Ikegaya | n/a |
| 2003 (7th) | Kajimunugatai: Kaze ga kataru Okinawa-sen, Susumu Higa | Helter Skelter, Kyōko Okazaki; Tenjin-san, Naomi Kimura; Mushishi, Yuki Urushibara; Baka-kyodai, Tetsu Adachi | Junkissa Nokoribi, Tai Itō | n/a |
| 2004 (8th) | Town of Evening Calm, Country of Cherry Blossoms, Fumiyo Kōno | With the Light: Raising an Autistic Child, Keiko Tobe; Mainichi Kaasan, Rieko Saibara; Witches, Daisuke Igarashi; Bande Sculptée: La Planète des Samouraïs, Shin'ichirō Natsusaka | Shōwa Nijūnen no Edekami, Shi no Hachigatsu Jūgojitsu, Watashi no Hachigatsu Jugonichi Association | n/a |
| 2005 (9th) | Disappearance Diary, Hideo Azuma | Pluto, Naoki Urasawa; Emma, Kaoru Mori; Dragon Zakura, Norifusa Mita; A Continuous Day, Yuki Sekine | E-Cartoon , Yoshio Nakae | n/a |
| 2006 (10th) | A Spirit of the Sun, Kaiji Kawaguchi | Ōoku, Fumi Yoshinaga; Osaka Hamlet, Hiromi Morishita; Beyond Twilight, Ichiko Ima; Yotsuba&!, Kiyohiko Azuma | Shiritori, Kazuko Chikuhama (story) and Kenichi Chikuhama (art) | n/a |
| 2007 (11th) | Mori no Asagao, Mamora Gōda | Suzuki Sensei, Kenzi Taketomi; Umimachi Diary, Akimi Yoshida; Takemitu Zamurai, Issei Eifuku (story) and Taiyo Matsumoto (art); Pride, Yukari Ichijō | Tenken, Yumiko Shirai | n/a |
| 2008 (12th) | Piano no Mori, Makoto Isshiki | Real Clothes, Satoru Makimura; Shiori to Shimiko, Daijiro Morohoshi; Maestro, Akira Sasō; Munakata Kyouju Ikouroku, Yukinobu Hoshino | Cartoon 2008, Masafumi Kikuchi | n/a |
| 2009 (13th) | Vinland Saga, Makoto Yukimura | Imuri, Ranjyo Miyake; Children of the Sea, Daisuke Igarashi; Konosekai no Katasumi ni, Fumiyo Kouno; Hyouge Mono, Yoshihiro Yamada | Hesheit Aqua, Wisut Ponnimit | n/a |
| 2010 (14th) | Historié, Hitoshi Iwaaki | The Climber, Shinichi Sakamoto; Fuuunji Tachi Bakumatsuhen, Tarou Minamoto; Bokurano, Mohiro Kitoh; RED, Naoki Yamamoto | Uchino Tsumatte Doudeshou?, Shigeyuki Fukumitsu | n/a |
| 2011 (15th) | Saturn Apartments, Hisae Iwaoka | Ano Hi Kara no Manga, Kotobuki Shiriagari; Arrugas, Paco Roca; Himitsu - Top Secret, Reiko Shimizu; Fun Home, Alison Bechdel | Nakayoshi-dan no Bōken, Tsuchika Nishimura | n/a |
| 2012 (16th) | Les Cités Obscures, Benoît Peeters and François Schuiten | Muchacho, Emanuel LePage; Gaku: Minna no Yama, Shinichi Ishizuka; Those Snow White Notes, Marimo Ragawa; Gunslinger Girl, Aida Yu | Our "Eruption" Festival, Shinzo Keigo | n/a |
| 2013 (17th) | JoJolion, Hirohiko Araki | Shouwa Genroku Rakugo Shinju, Haruko Kumota; Soredemo Machi wa Mawatteiru, Masakazu Ishiguro; Chiisakobee, Minetaro Mochizuki, original author: Shūgorō Yamamoto; Terrarium in a Drawer, Ryoko Kui | Alice & Zoroku, Tetsuya Imai; A Taste of Chlorine, Bastien Vivès; Natsuyasumi no Machi, Matida You | n/a |
| 2014 (18th) | Goshiki no Fune, Yōko Kondō (art) and Yasumi Tsuhara (original story) | Aoi Honō, Kazuhiko Shimamoto; A Chinese Life, Li Kunwu and Philippe Ôtié; Harukaze no Sunegurachika, Hiroaki Samura; Hitsuji no Ki, Mikio Igarashi, original author: Tatsuhiko Yamagami | Ai o Kurae!!, Renaissance Yoshida; Chi-chan wa Chotto Tarinai, Tomomi Abe; Dobugawa, Aoi Ikebe | n/a |
| 2015 (19th) | Blank Canvas: My So-Called Artist's Journey, Akiko Higashimura | Scenes from Awajima, Takako Shimura; Otouto no Otto, Gengoroh Tagame; Kikaijikake no Ai, Yoshiie Gouda; Non-working City, Ting Fung HO | esoragoto, nerunodaisuki; Tamashii Ippai, Yuka Okuyama; Machida-kun no Sekai, Yuki Ando | n/a |
| 2017 (20th) | Blue Giant, Shinichi Ishizuka | Soumubu Soumuka Yamaguchi Roppeita, Kenichirō Takai / Original author: Norio Hayashi; Incomplete Life, Yoon Tae-ho / Translation: Ayako Furukawa / Kim Seung-bok; Yūgai Toshi, Tetsuya Tsutsui; Sunny, Taiyō Matsumoto | Ōten no Mon, Yak Haibara; Tsuki ni Hoeran nee, Yukiko Seike; Jasmin, Yui Hata | n/a |
| 2018 (21st) | Nee mama (My Dear, Mom), Ikebe Aoi | Ulna at the Emplacement, Izu Toru; Nyx no Lantern, Kan Takahama; Yorunome wa sendegozaimasu (The Night Has a Thousand Eyes), Ueno Kentaro; AI no Idenshi (Gene of AI), Yamada Kyuri | AMAGI Yuiko no tsuno to ai (A Horn and Love of AMAGI Yuiko), Kuno Yoko; BAKU-CHAN, Masumura Jushichi; Beastars, Paru Itagaki | n/a |
| 2019 (22nd) | Origin, Boichi | Space Battleship Tiramisu, Satoshi Miyakawa, Kei Ito; Nagi no Oitoma, Misato Konari; Momo & Manji, Sawa Sakura; To dusk, Nazuna Saito | Kiiroi Enban (Yellow Disk), Tenshin Kijima; The Invisible Difference, Mademoiselle Caroline, Julie Dachez; BL Metamorphosis, Kaori Tsurutani | n/a |
| 2020 (23rd) | A Brief History of Robo sapiens, Toranosuke Shimada | Since I Could Die Tomorrow, Sumako Kari; Double, Ayako Noda; Memoirs of Amorous Gentlemen, Moyoco Anno; The Arab of the Future: A Childhood in the Middle East (1978-1984), Riad Sattouf | If You Become an Adult, Atsushi Ito; Hana to Hoho, Kei Itoi; Captivated, by You, Yama Wayama | Ushijima the Loan Shark, Shohei Manabe |
| 2021 (24th) | March Comes In Like a Lion, Chica Umino | Innocent Rouge, Shin-ichi Sakamoto; A Smart and Courageous Child, Miki Yamamoto; Hitori de Shintai, Kaoru Curryzawa; Hei no Naka no Biyōshitsu, Marco Kohinata and Mina Sakurai | Swingin' Dragon Tiger Boogie, Koukou Haida; Soratobu Kujira, Suzuhiro Suzuki; My Broken Mariko, Waka Hirako | Golden Kamuy, Satoru Noda |
| 2022 (25th) | Golden Raspberry, Aki Mochida | The Darwin Incident, Shun Umezawa; Dead Dead Demon's Dededede Destruction, Inio Asano; The Concierge at Hokkyoku Department Store, Tsuchika Nishimura; The Best We Could Do, Thi Bui | Kitsune to Tanuki to Iinazuke, Seiichi Tokiwa; Korogaru Kyōdai, Tsubumi Mori; Lost Lad London, Shinya Shima | Onna no Sono no Hoshi, Yama Wayama |

== See also ==
- List of animation awards
- List of manga awards
- Lists of animated feature films
- BAFTA Award for Best Animated Film
- Annie Award for Best Animated Feature
- Golden Globe Award for Best Animated Feature Film
- Critics' Choice Movie Award for Best Animated Feature
- Annie Award for Best Animated Feature — Independent
- Saturn Award for Best Animated Film
- Animation Kobe
- Tokyo Anime Award
