= Slime Saint =

Japanese manga series

- First tankōbon volume cover

スライム聖女 (Suraimu Seijo)
- Genre: Fantasy comedy
- Manga
- Written by: Aira Yao
- Illustrated by: Umashi
- Published by: Shueisha
- English publisher: NA: Seven Seas Entertainment
- Imprint: Young Jump Comics
- Magazine: Tonari no Young Jump; Isekai Young Jump
- Original run: December 12, 2023 – present
- Volumes: 7

Slime Saint (スライム聖女, Suraimu Seijo) is a Japanese manga series written by Aira Yao and illustrated by Umashi. It began serialization on Shueisha's Tonari no Young Jump website and the Nico Nico Seiga website under Shueisha's Isekai Young Jump brand in December 2023.

== Synopsis ==
The series focuses on an unnamed slime who has inhabited the corpse of Jelly Aspic, a saint. The slime took over Jelly's body without any prior knowledge of who Jelly was, and when she later learns of Jelly's reputation as a cruel wicked woman, she tries to avoid getting killed.

== Characters ==
Jelly Aspic (ジェリィ・アスピック, Jeryī Asupikku)
Voiced by: Sora Amamiya (PV)
Erin (エリン)
Voiced by: Ai Kakuma (PV)
Will (ウィル, Uiru)
Voiced by: Kaito Ishikawa (PV)
Markov (マルコフ, Marukofu)
Voiced by: Mutsuki Iwanaka (PV)
Rumiru (ルミル)
Voiced by: Nozomi Furuki (PV)

== Media ==
=== Manga ===
Written by Aira Yao and illustrated by Umashi, Slime Saint began serialization on Shueisha's Tonari no Young Jump website and the Nico Nico Seiga website under Shueisha's Isekai Young Jump brand on December 12, 2023. Its chapters have been compiled into seven tankōbon volumes as of June 2026.

In December 2025, Seven Seas Entertainment announced that they had licensed the manga for English publication, with the first volume set to be released in November 2026.

No.	Original release date	Original ISBN	North American release date	North American ISBN
1	July 18, 2024	978-4-08-893335-1	November 24, 2026	979-8-89863-499-5
2	September 19, 2024	978-4-08-893366-5	March 23, 2027	979-8-89863-545-9
3	January 17, 2025	978-4-08-893544-7	—	—
4	June 18, 2025	978-4-08-893724-3	—	—
5	September 19, 2025	978-4-08-893820-2	—	—
6	February 19, 2026	978-4-08-894154-7	—	—
7	June 18, 2026	978-4-08-894212-4	—	—
8	December 17, 2026	978-4-08-894450-0	—	—

=== Other ===
In commemoration of the first volume's release on July 18, 2024, a promotional video was uploaded to the Weekly Young Jump YouTube channel that same day. It featured voice acting from Sora Amamiya, Kaito Ishikawa, Mutsuki Iwanaka, Ai Kakuma and Nozomi Furuki.

== Reception ==
The series topped Niconico's 1st Manga General Election in the "Isekai Comic" Category in 2024.
