= Tetsuya Tsutsui =

Japanese manga artist (born 1974)

Tetsuya Tsutsui 筒井哲也
- Born: November 17, 1974 (age 52) Aichi Prefecture, Japan
- Area: Manga artist
- Notable works: Prophecy; Yūgai Toshi
- Awards: Association des Critiques et des journalistes de Bande Dessinée Prix Asie in 2015; Japan Media Arts Festival Excellence Prize in 2017

Tetsuya Tsutsui (Japanese: 筒井哲也, Hepburn: Tsutsui Tetsuya; born November 17, 1974) is a Japanese manga artist. He debuted in 2002 and launched his first series, Duds Hunt, later that year. He is best known for creating Prophecy and Yūgai Toshi, the latter of which won the Association des Critiques et des journalistes de Bande Dessinée's Prix Asie in 2015 and an Excellence Prize at the Japan Media Arts Festival in 2017. His works are popular in France.

== Works ==
Title	Year	Magazine	Publisher(s)	Notes	Ref.
Duds Hunt (ダズハント, Dazuhanto)	2002	—N/a	Square Enix		
Manhole (マンホール, Manhooru)	2004–2006	Young Gangan	Square Enix		
Reset (リセット, Reseto)	2005	Young Gangan	Square Enix		
Prophecy (予告犯, Yokokuhan)	2011–2013	Jump X	Shueisha		
Yokokuhan: The Copycat (予告犯 -THE COPYCAT-)	2014–2015	Jump X; Weekly Young Jump	Shueisha	With Fumio Obata	
Yūgai Toshi (有害都市)	2014–2015	Jump X; Tonari no Young Jump	Shueisha		
Noise (ノイズ, Noizu)	2017–2020	Grand Jump	Shueisha		
Neeting Life	2021–2023	Tonari no Young Jump	Shueisha		

== Awards ==
Year	Award	Category	Work/Recipient	Result	Ref
2015	Association des Critiques et des journalistes de Bande Dessinée	Prix Asie	Yūgai Toshi	Won	
2017	Japan Media Arts Festival	Excellence Prize	Yūgai Toshi	Won	
