= Spear of the Wind =

Japanese manga series

- First tankōbon volume cover

風の槍 (Kaze no Yari)
- Genre: Drama; Historical
- Manga
- Written by: Number 8
- Illustrated by: Hinako Yano
- Published by: Shogakukan
- Imprint: Ura Sunday Comics
- Magazine: MangaONE; Ura Sunday
- Original run: April 10, 2022 – present
- Volumes: 9

Spear of the Wind (Japanese: 風の槍, Hepburn: Kaze no Yari) is a Japanese manga series written by Number 8 and illustrated by Hinako Yano. It has been serialized in Shogakukan's Ura Sunday website and MangaONE app since April 2022, with its chapters collected in nine tankōbon volumes as of August 2026.

== Publication ==
Written by Number 8 and illustrated by Hinako Yano, Spear of the Wind began serialization in Shogakukan's MangaONE app on April 10, 2022. It started on the Ura Sunday website a day later, on April 10. Shogakukan has collected its chapters into individual tankōbon volumes. The first volume was released on October 28, 2022. As of August 10, 2026, nine volumes have been released.

No.	Release date	ISBN
1	October 28, 2022	978-4-09-851345-1
2	February 10, 2023	978-4-09-851541-7
3	June 12, 2023	978-4-09-852140-1
4	November 10, 2023	978-4-09-852891-2
5	May 10, 2024	978-4-09-853154-7
6	November 19, 2024	978-4-09-853594-1
7	April 11, 2025	978-4-09-853863-8
8	December 12, 2025	978-4-09-854195-9
9	August 10, 2026	978-4-09-854729-6

== Reception ==
The series was recommended by Blue Giant manga author Shinichi Ishizuka, with a comment featured on the obi of the first volume.
