= Yūgai Toshi =

Japanese manga series

- First tankōbon volume cover

有害都市
- Manga
- Written by: Tetsuya Tsutsui
- Published by: Shueisha
- Magazine: Jump X (2014); Tonari no Young Jump (2015)
- Original run: April 10, 2014 – October 9, 2015
- Volumes: 2

Yūgai Toshi (有害都市; "Poison City") is a Japanese manga series written and illustrated by Tetsuya Tsutsui. It was serialized in Shueisha's seinen manga magazine Jump X from April to October 2014, until the magazine ceased its publication, and later moved to the Tonari no Young Jump website, where it ran from February to October 2015. Its chapters were collected in two tankōbon volumes.

Created in response to what amounted to a ban of Tsutsui's previous work Manhole by the government of Nagasaki Prefecture, Yūgai Toshi addresses censorship in Japan and follows fictional events similar to the circumstances of Manhole's ban.

== Plot ==
In 2019, the Japanese government cracks down on censorship in the lead-up to the 2020 Summer Olympics, making any material they deem "obscene" increasingly difficult to publish. During this time, manga author Hibino Mikio attempts to publish Dark Walker, which centers around a contagious disease that turns people into cannibals overnight. These efforts lead to him being embroiled in a conflict between the manga industry and the government over freedom of speech.

== Publication ==
Written and illustrated by Tetsuya Tsutsui, Yūgai Toshi started in Shueisha's seinen manga magazine Jump X on April 10, 2014. After Jump X ceased publication on October 10, 2014, an extra chapter was published in Weekly Young Jump on November 27 of that year, and the series was later transferred to the Tonari no Young Jump website, where it ran from February 27, 2015, until its conclusion on October 9 of the same year. Shueisha collected its chapters in two tankōbon volumes, released on April 17 and December 18, 2015.

== Reception ==
The manga was awarded the French ACBD's "Asie de la Critique" in 2015. It received the Excellence Award at the 20th Japan Media Arts Festival in 2017.
