= Manhole (disambiguation) =

A manhole is an opening used to gain access to sewers or other underground structures such as shafts, usually for maintenance.

Manhole may also refer to:

== Film and TV ==
- Manhole (TV series), a South Korean drama series
- Manhole (2014 film), a 2014 South Korean film
- Manhole (2016 film), an Indian film
- #Manhole, a Japanese film directed by Kazuyoshi Kumakiri

== Music ==
- Manhole (band), a metal band from Los Angeles
- Manhole (album), an album by Grace Slick

== Games ==
- Manhole (video game), a game in the Nintendo Game & Watch series
- The Manhole, a computer game

== Literature ==
- Manhole (manga), a 2004 manga by Tetsuya Tsutsui
