= NUT (studio) =

Japanese animation studio

NUT Co., Ltd.
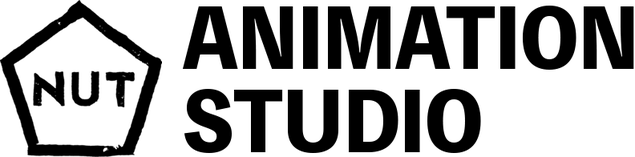
- Native name: 株式会社ナット
- Romanized name: Kabushiki-gaisha Natto
- Type: Subsidiary
- Industry: Japanese animation
- Founded: 2017; 9 years ago
- Founders: Takuya Tsunoki; Masayuki Narai
- Headquarters: 1-24-19 Kamiogi, Suginami, Tokyo, Japan
- Products: Animation planning and development
- Parent: Twin Engine
- Website: nutinc.jp

NUT Co., Ltd. (Japanese: 株式会社ナット, Hepburn: Kabushiki-gaisha Natto) is a Japanese animation studio subsidiary of Twin Engine founded in 2017 by ex-Madhouse producer Takuya Tsunoki and Chiptune CEO Masayuki Narai. Narai served as president and CEO until his death.

In 2026, the studio was acquired by Twin Engine, becoming part of the Twin Engine Group to strengthen production capabilities and deepen its role in original IP development.

== Works ==
=== Television series ===
Title	Director(s)	First run start date	First run end date	Eps	Note(s)	Ref(s)
Yōjo Senki: Saga of Tanya the Evil	Yutaka Uemura	January 6, 2017	March 31, 2017	12	Adaptation of the light novel series by Carlo Zen.	
FLCL Alternative	Katsuyuki Motohiro; Yutaka Uemura	September 8, 2018	October 13, 2018	6	Third season of FLCL. Co-produced with Production I.G and Revoroot.	
Deca-Dence	Yuzuru Tachikawa	July 8, 2020	September 23, 2020	12	Original work.	
FLCL: Shoegaze	Yutaka Uemura	October 1, 2023	October 15, 2023	3	Fifth season of FLCL. Co-produced with Production I.G.	
Bullbuster	Hiroyasu Aoki	October 4, 2023	December 20, 2023	12	Based on a multimedia franchise by Kadokawa Corporation.	
Negative Positive Angler	Yutaka Uemura	October 3, 2024	December 19, 2024	12	Original work.	
Yōjo Senki: Saga of Tanya the Evil II	Takayuki Yamamoto	July 8, 2026	September 23, 2026	12	Sequel to Saga of Tanya the Evil: The Movie.	

=== Films ===
Title	Director(s)	Release Date	Note(s)	Ref(s)
Saga of Tanya the Evil: The Movie	Yutaka Uemura	February 8, 2019	Sequel to Yōjo Senki: Saga of Tanya the Evil.	
Blue Giant	Yuzuru Tachikawa	February 17, 2023	Adaptation of the manga series by Shinichi Ishizuka.	
