= Tsuki ga Kirei =

Japanese anime television series

- Cover of the first Blu-ray volume for Tsuki ga Kirei.

月がきれい
- Genre: Romance, coming-of-age
- Anime television series
- Directed by: Seiji Kishi
- Produced by: Ken Minami; Takema Okamura; Toshihiro Maeda; Hiroshi Kamei
- Written by: Yūko Kakihara
- Music by: Takurō Iga
- Studio: Feel
- Licensed by: Crunchyroll (Note: In North America through Crunchyroll, LLC formerly known as Funimation for home video release.)
- Original network: Tokyo MX, MBS, BS11, TVA
- Original run: April 6, 2017 – June 29, 2017
- Episodes: 12
- icon

Tsuki ga Kirei (月がきれい; transl. As the Moon, So Beautiful. (Note: While directly translated as "The moon is beautiful, isn't it?" the phrase "Tsuki ga kirei desu ne." (月が綺麗ですね。) is a common Japanese phrase that means "I love you." The phrase is commonly attributed to Meiji-era novelist Natsume Sōseki since he believed that two people in love do not need direct words to convey their feelings.)) is a Japanese anime television series produced by Feel. It aired in Japan from April 6 to June 29, 2017.

It follows two junior high school students, falling in love for the first time and struggling to maintain their relationship.

== Plot ==
Kotaro Azumi and Akane Mizuno become third year students at junior high school and are classmates for the first time. They are put in charge of the equipment for a sports festival and slowly grow closer via LINE. These two, along with fellow students Chinatsu Nishio and Takumi Hira, relate to their peers through mutual understandings and feelings. As their final year at junior high school progresses, the group overcome their challenges to mature and become aware of changes in themselves.

== Characters ==
=== Main ===
Kotarō Azumi (安曇 小太郎, Azumi Kotarō)
Voiced by: Shōya Chiba (Japanese); Stephen Sanders (English)
Student of class 3-1 who belongs to the literature club. He is aiming to become a novelist and respects Osamu Dazai. He generally has a calm and composed attitude. He is initially embarrassed to show his novels to others, but upon learning Akane's love for running and openness to use embarrassment as a method of improving oneself, he begins to open up. From early childhood, Kotarō has received instruction in the performance of traditional dance and festival music accompaniment, Hayashi, at a local Shinto shrine. He secretly starts dating Akane, but later let Takumi know about this secret.
When Akane is forced to move to Chiba due to her father's work, Kotarō fails to get into the same school as her, despite his parents' objections. He is unable to see Akane off on her moving day, but he publishes an online story promising to love her forever. Despite their long-distance relationship, they are still in contact with each other and visit each other. The final shot for the end of the series shows them married with a child years later.
Akane Mizuno (水野 茜, Mizuno Akane)
Voiced by: Konomi Kohara (Japanese); Apphia Yu (English)
Student of class 3-1 who belongs to the track and field club. She is an easygoing character, but can be self-conscious and timid at times. When feeling nervous, she would squeeze her potato mascot plushie. Akane moved to Kawagoe, Saitama when she was a fifth grader in Primary school. She secretly starts dating Kotarō, but later reveals this to Chinatsu and Takumi, who inform the class about that.
When she is forced to relocate to Chiba due to her father's work, she becomes anxious over her future relationship with Kotarō, but cheers him on as he tries to get into the same school as her. When Kotarō fails to get in, she again becomes anxious, but she finds new hope when she reads his online story, which is a promise to love her forever.
Takumi Hira (比良 拓海, Hira Takumi)
Voiced by: Atsushi Tamaru (Japanese); Daman Mills (English)
The president of track and field club. He has been in love with Akane since first year.
Chinatsu Nishio (西尾 千夏, Nishio Chinatsu)
Voiced by: Rie Murakawa (Japanese); Megan Shipman (English)
One of Akane's best friends in track and field club who is easygoing. She begins to catch feelings for Azumi.

=== Class 3-1 ===
Daichi Ogasawara
Voiced by: Makoto Kaneko (Japanese); Tyson Rinehart (English)
One of Kotarō's best friends who is in the school's judo club. He laments his lack of popularity with girls which he attributes to the membership of the judo club.
Roman Yamashina
Voiced by: Eishin Fudemura (Japanese); Brandon McInnis (English)
One of Kotarō's best friends who has easygoing personality and constantly wanting to read Kotarō's novel, despite the latter's rejection. He is in love with his homeroom teacher Ryōko and will not hesitate to show it.
Aira Miyamoto
Voiced by: Manaka Iwami (Japanese); Kristen McGuire (English)
Akane's friend in class 3-1 who is belonged in the tennis club. She falls for Kaneko and dates him.
Setsuko Satō
Voiced by: Misono Suzuki (Japanese); Kristi Rothrock (English)
Akane's friend in class 3-1 who is dating Nagahara. She constantly pays for the fees whenever her boyfriend brings her to a love hotel, even during their school trip to Kyoto.
Miu Imazu
Voiced by: Haruka Chisuga (Japanese); Bryn Apprill (English)
Akane's friend in class 3-1. She has a somewhat black-hearted personality and always henpecks Inaba.
Sakura Tanaka
Voiced by: Honoka Inoue (Japanese); Michelle Rojas (English)
A bespectacled girl in class 3-1 who always fantasizes about being popular with the boys, despite her plain looks.
Shō Nagahara
Voiced by: Yūya Hirose (Japanese); Austin Tindle (English)
Setsuko's boyfriend. A flashy boy who always brings his girlfriend to a love hotel and makes her pay.
Yasuhito Inaba
Voiced by: Mark Ishii (Japanese); Ben Phillips (English)
Miu's "boyfriend", the status of which is often questioned by Inaba himself because of Miu's henpecking.
Aoi Takizawa
Voiced by: Haruka Shiraishi (Japanese); Felecia Angelle (English)
A member of the school's track team. She is popular with both girls and boys, but she adopts a hostile attitude towards boys in general and displays no interest in romance.
Tsubasa Kaneko
Voiced by: Kentarō Kumagai (Japanese); Aaron Dismuke (English)
A member of the school's baseball team in class 3-1 who manages to make Aira fall for him. He is skilled in dealing with his girlfriend's jealousy.
Daisuke Tachibana
Voiced by: Mutsuki Iwanaka (Japanese); Ian Sinclair (English)
The employee of a bookshop that Kotarō frequents. He reads his novels and gives helpful advice on both novel writing and romance.
Ryōko Sonoda
Voiced by: Nao Tōyama (Japanese); Jamie Marchi (English)
Class 3-1's homeroom teacher. She is in love with Roman and struggles to wait until his graduation to express her love. She is also the target of affection of Hidaka-sensei.

=== Others ===
Ryūnosuke Azumi
Voiced by: Kazuo Oka (Japanese); Kent Williams (English)
Kotaro's father. He supports him about the novel's writing aspirations.
Junko Azumi
Voiced by: Kikuko Inoue (Japanese); Alex Moore (English)
Kotaro's mother. She does not want him to write novels or take Akane's high school entrance examination.
Hiroshi Mizuno
Voiced by: Mitsuo Iwata (Japanese); Sonny Strait (English)
Akane and Ayane's father, who is protective of his daughters, but he is also shown to be accepting of their boyfriends once he gets to know them better.
Saori Mizuno
Voiced by: Chiwa Saito (Japanese); Monica Rial (English)
Akane and Ayane's mother.
Ayane Mizuno
Voiced by: Ryōko Maekawa (Japanese); Morgan Lauré (English)
Akane's elder sister who is currently in high school. She is dating Kasai, an aspiring carpenter.

== Production and development ==
An original anime television series produced by Feel was announced in January 2017. Seiji Kishi directed the anime while Yūko Kakihara penned and supervised the series' scripts, and Kazuaki Morita adapted Loundraw's original character designs. Takurō Iga and FlyingDog composed and produced the music, respectively, while Nagano served as the series' producer. It aired on April 6, 2017, on Tokyo MX with further broadcasts on MBS, BS11 and TVA then ended on June 29, 2017. Nao Tōyama sung both the opening and ending theme titled "Ima Koko" (イマココ) and "Tsuki ga Kirei" (月がきれい), respectively. Tōyama also performed the insert song for episode 3, "Hatsukoi" (初恋).

Crunchyroll streamed the series outside of Asia, and Funimation dubbed the series and released it on home video in North America as part of their partnership with Crunchyroll.

== Episodes ==
All episodes are named after notable works in Japanese literature.

No.	Title (Note: All English titles are taken from Crunchyroll.)	Directed by	Written by	Original release date
1	"Spring and Hard Times"; Transliteration: "Haru to Shura" (Japanese: 春と修羅)	Mitsuhiro Iwasaki	Yūko Kakihara	April 6, 2017
Kotarō Azumi and Akane Mizuno are middle school students at Kawagoe Academy in Kawagoe, Saitama. Upon entering their third and final year, they join their school track club: Kotarō as an equipment manager and Akane as a runner. Both struggle with social situations: Kotarō, a bookworm with an affinity for Osamu Dazai, is reluctant to share his writings to other people, while Akane often squishes a plushie to curb her anxiety. They are in the same class but are too embarrassed to speak with one another. One day, they bump into each other while at dinner with their families, who facilitating conversations between them, much to their chagrin. After Akane asks Kotarō not to tell anyone, and they rarely converse until Akane accidentally forgets to add Kotarō in the track club's LINE group. Eventually, she corrects the mistake.
2	"A Handful of Sand"; Transliteration: "Ichiaku no Suna" (Japanese: 一握の砂)	Yoshimichi Hirai	Yūko Kakihara	April 13, 2017
Akane and a reluctant Kotarō take part in their last sports festival in middle school, as part of the same team. Akane manages to gain a massive lead for them during her 200 metres, which leaves Kotarō impressed. However, the out-of-shape Kotarō ends up tripping during his trial and scrapes his hand, letting Takumi Hira, the track club president and Akane's friend, to win. Chinatsu Nishio, Akane's best friend, poorly bandages him. Later, while going over the itinerary, Akane drops her plushie with the sports equipment. Upon realizing she has lost her plushie, Akane's anxiety peaks and she fumbles the baton in the 4 x 100 metres relay, costing her team's victory. Takumi, who most classmates assume has a crush on Akane, try to console her. Kotarō eventually finds the Akane's plushie and returns it to her. A grateful Akane spills all of her insecurities to Kotarō, which he can relate to, and awkwardly tells her she is fine just the way she is. Inspired by Akane, Kotarō begins showing his work to local bookstore owner Daisuke Tachibana. Upon returning home, Kotarō and Akane begin a private chat on LINE.
3	"Howling at the Moon"; Transliteration: "Tsuki ni Hoeru" (Japanese: 月に吠える)	Gidai Hiromine	Yūko Kakihara	April 20, 2017
During midterm exams, Kotarō learns the story he submitted in a magazine competition did not get selected. He messages Akane about it, who encourages him. Chinatsu is now friends with Kotarō. With the school trip looming, the third years become abuzz with dating gossip. Kotarō overhears Chinatsu and her friend Aoi talking about Takumi should asking Akane out, to his dismay. On the day of one of Akane's track meets, Kotarō goes to a shrine for work and decides to pray for Akane there, where she sets a new personal record. Takumi attempts to ask her out, but he backs out. Later, after Kotarō finishes, he runs into Akane outside of the shrine. As they sit together privately in silence, Kotarō asks Akane out.
4	"Passing Shower"; Transliteration: "Tōriame" (Japanese: 通り雨)	Makoto Nakata	Yūko Kakihara	April 27, 2017
Akane decides to give Kotarō's request some thought, but does not reply for several days. Eventually, it is time for the school trip to Kyoto. At the beginning, the teachers confiscate all of the electronics, but Kotarō and his friends Daichi and Roman smuggle theirs in by hiding them in a snack bag. Several other students use similar tactics. On the trip, Akane continues to avoid Kotarō, despite him constantly looking at his phone waiting for a response. At night, he eventually messages her to meet in front of a Daimaru department store, but one teacher (despite being drunk) catches him, causing him to miss Akane's mixed reply. In the morning, Akane goes out shopping with friends. She eventually decides to go to the store, but while waiting for him, it starts to rain. Kotarō arrives, but just missing her. He eventually contacts her by borrowing Chinatsu's phone, and they meet at a shrine. Akane chastises him for being late and his apparent closeness with Chinatsu. She eventually agrees to go out with him to get to know him better.
5	"Kokoro"; Transliteration: "Kokoro" (Japanese: こころ)	Takafumi Fujii	Yūko Kakihara	May 4, 2017
Kotaro and Akane start dating, but they decide to keep it a secret with the exception of Akane's older sister Ayane. As a result of their relationship, Kotaro's grades begin faltering. They begin questioning how to progress their relationship, leading Kotaro to eventually ask Akane to meet him at the library for private lunch together. When the time comes, however, Akane becomes anxious to not leave her friends behind. Kotaro ends up in the library with Chinatsu, who decides to go to the same cram school as him. Akane eventually shows up and continues to be jealous, causing her track performance to falter. Takumi confronts her later about her performance, exacerbating the rumors they are dating. Kotaro goes to Daisuke for advice, who leaves his bookstore and lets Akane spend time with Kotaro. They engage in small talk, where Kotaro says he admires watching her run and decides to go watch her at next track meet. They hold hands for the first time, when Akane gets a message from Chinatsu saying she has a crush on Kotaro.
6	"Run, Melos!"; Transliteration: "Hashire Merosu" (Japanese: 走れメロス)	Makoto Nakata	Yūko Kakihara	May 11, 2017
Akane does not tell Kotaro about Chinatsu's message, and Kotaro, his spirits lifted, begins excelling at his temple practices and learns his story will possibly be published. He meets Akane in the library to tell her, though he learns he will miss her since she is at the track meet. Later, Akane tells Chinatsu she is dating Kotaro, who says she already knew. Each of them fail in their respective tasks: only Chinatsu does well in the meet as Akane fails to move up to the next round, while Kotaro's story is rejected. Akane tells Ayane (who told her parents about Akane dating someone) about Chinatsu, who tells her to dump Chinatsu. Instead, after she and Kotaro vow to keep working towards their goals, Akane tells Chinatsu she just wants to remain friends. Chinatsu agrees, but asks Akane if she can at least gain closure by confessing to Kotaro.
6.5	"First Half: The Road So Far"; Transliteration: "Zenhanshō Dōtei" (Japanese: 前半抄「道程」)	N/A	N/A	May 18, 2017
Recap of episodes 1–6.
7	"Hold Back Nothing When Taking Love"; Transliteration: "Oshiminaku Ai wa Ubau" (Japanese: 惜しみなく愛は奪う)	Masatoyo Takada	Yūko Kakihara	May 25, 2017
Chinatsu invites Akane, Kotaro, and Hira to an amusement park, which results in a large group forming. During the trip, Chinatsu begins making several passes at Kotaro, and the others attempt to push Akane and Takumi together. While browsing in the gift shop, Roman goes missing. Kotaro finds him in the First Aid, where Roman admits that he knew Kotaro is dating Akane. Roman attempts to give them some private time together. He learns the group abandoned Akane and Takumi, intentionally to get time so they can start dating. Kotaro eventually finds them and, feeling threatened, tells Takumi he and Akane are dating. The couple leaves together, which a saddened Chinatsu sees. Takumi returns to the group and let them know about the situation. Kotaro and Akane decide to go off on their own through the park. Hours later, they watch the fireworks separately from the group. They almost share their first kiss, but they are interrupted by a little girl. Meanwhile. Chinatsu admits to Takumi she invited him to try and split Akane off with him, and he forgives her.
8	"Vita Sexualis"; Transliteration: "Wita Sekusuarisu" (Japanese: ヰタ・セクスアリス)	Satoshi Saga	Yūko Kakihara	June 1, 2017
Eventually, their classmates become aware Kotaro and Akane are dating. They manage to spend more time together, including Akane visiting Kotaro while he does to his festival practice. Afterwards, the temple heads give Kotaro some money for him to take Akane to a festival shrine. Things go well until Akane learns she missed Kotaro's birthday, prompting her to briefly go out to buy him an identical plushie as a gift. At night, they continue to explore the festival, including writing down their wishes to place on wind chimes. While walking back together on a bridge, the two share their first kiss. They wrote the same wish on their wind chimes: they want to remain together forever.
9	"The Wind Rises"; Transliteration: "Kaze Tachinu" (Japanese: 風立ちぬ)	Gidai Hiromine	Yūko Kakihara	June 8, 2017
High school applications season starts, and Kotaro and Akane are determined to go to the same school despite not knowing which one specifically. At dinner, each is faced with serious prospects: Akane's father is getting transferred to Chiba, while Kotaro's mother pressures him to make a serious choice of high school (despite his father's opposite belief), causing him to consider doing light novels instead of serious literature. Neither tells the other about the situation. Instead, Kotaro secretly invites himself to Akane's final track meet, where she sets a new personal record. Chinatsu ends up spotting him. Akane later accidentally tells Takumi about moving. In response, Takumi invites the track club to go to Kotaro's festival. Both he and Chinatsu acknowledge they have not really gotten over Akane and Kotaro. At night, Kotaro admits to Akane he went to the track meet, and Akane tells him about moving.
10	"The Setting Sun"; Transliteration: "Shayō" (Japanese: 斜陽)	Yoshimichi Hirai	Yūko Kakihara	June 15, 2017
Akane decides to apply to a school in Chiba her parents and Takumi recommended. She meets with Kotaro, who says he will try to apply to the same school so they will be together. The track club later goes to Kotaro's festival, where they see him performing. Later, Takumi and Akane go separately to throw away some belongings. While they wait for Kotaro to get on break, Takumi admits that he has a crush on her, unaware Kotaro is watching. Overwhelmed with everything going on, Kotaro later confronts Akane about Takumi. Though she explains the situation, Kotaro remains frustrated and continues to help with the festival, causing Akane to tearfully leave. The two do not talk to each other for a while, until Akane notices someone at Kotaro's cram school ordered an application to the high school Akane plans to attend. Akane asks Kotaro about it, and he tells her that, regardless of his future, he wants to be with her. Akane tearfully thanks and kisses him.
11	"An Encouragement of Learning"; Transliteration: "Gakumon no Susume" (Japanese: 学問のすすめ)	Masayo Nozaki	Yūko Kakihara	June 22, 2017
Kotaro begins studying incredibly hard to admitted to Akane's school, despite not having sufficient grades. Initially, his mother is elated, having earlier criticized his hobbies as distractions. However, at a PTS conference, Kotaro reveals his true intentions, straining his relationship with his parents. Meanwhile, in addition to studying, Akane starts knitting a scarf for Kotaro. Ayame catches her, forcing Akane to reveal the situation. She is skeptical, believing they might break up later. The entire school eventually finds out about his intentions, much to their embarrassment. Kotaro and Akane manage to go on a Christmas date, during which Akane gives Kotaro the scarf. As they talk about the grades, Akane mentions how a parent's support can mean a lot, comparing how her parents always supported her to his parents. Sometime later, after Akane gets accepted, Kotaro learns from his father that his mother (and subsequently he himself) now supports his decision due to his dedication, as long as he passes the exam. They make amends over a midnight snack. Kotaro leaves in the morning to go to the exam.
12	"And Then"; Transliteration: "Sorekara" (Japanese: それから)	Takafumi Fujii, Masatoyo Takada, Makoto Nakata, Yoshimichi Hirai, Takafumi Ikehata	Yūko Kakihara	June 29, 2017
Kotaro learns that he was not accepted into Akane's school, saddening them. Daisuke suggests Kotaro use it in his writing, while Ayane suggests Akane should break up with him than continue with long-distance relationship. Kotaro and Chinatsu end up accepted into the same high school. While walking home, Chinatsu confesses to Kotaro, but amicably accepts his rejection. After graduation, upon a suggestion from Roman, Kotaro starts self-publishing online. He and Akane go for a walk, where they make plans to continue with a long-distance relationship. A seemingly hopeful Kotaro vows to make more efforts to see her, but Akane remains worried as evidenced by Chinatsu's confession, they will eventually break up. She admits her anxiety has left her convinced she has done nothing but trouble Kotaro. After she kisses him, she flees and breaks down crying. Weeks later, Akane's family begins moving. While Akane says goodbyes to Chinatsu and Aoi, her parents let her take a later trip, and Chinatsu shows her Kotaro's published work: a story about her. Kotaro, meanwhile, is caught up in festival work and is unable to see her off. Daisuke shows him the story has become incredibly popular, when Kotaro notices Akane posted a comment "What happens next?". He rushes to see her at the station, but she had already left. Instead, he replies in the comments, and shouts from a bridge as her train goes by, he loves her. In the credits, the couple make their long-distance relationship work over the next several years. They eventually go to college together, move into an apartment as adults. At the end, they are married with a child, all the while messaging through LINE.
SP	"Tsuki ga Kirei Specials"; Transliteration: "Tsuki ga Kirei Tokubetsu" (Japanese: 月がきれい特別)	Seiji Kishi	Yūko Kakihara	September 27, 2017
It consists of 27 extra scenes in the Tsuki ga Kirei series, which is released in the blu-ray of the anime.
