= Ralf Baecker =

German media artist

Ralf Baecker (born 1977 in Düsseldorf) is a German artist known for his installation works that use complex electronic systems. Baecker studied media art at Cologne's Academy of Media Arts.

== Work ==
Baecker's Irrational Computing, created in 2014, used elemental quartz crystals to create a basic signal processing unit. Created the same year, Mirage employed a luminous red light projection based on readings of the Earth's magnetic field. In 2015 he received an Honorary mention at Ars Electronica for Mirage. In 2017 his work Order+Noise (Interface I), which uses background radiation data to control mechanical movements, received the grand prize at the Japan Media Arts Festival. His 2018 work Putting the Pieces Back together Again involves an array of 1250 stepper motors that create a swarm-like display of mechanical movement.

Baecker is a professor of experimental design of new technologies at the University of the Arts Bremen.
