= Andreas Lutz =

German artist

Andreas Lutz (born 1981 in Freiburg i. Br.) is a German Media artist and musician. In his work, he explores the human machine relation with the approach, to create integrated and universal communication systems.

== Biography ==
Lutz graduated from University of Applied Sciences Offenburg with a diploma in Media and Information engineering in 2009. His initial works refer to alternative human-machine interaction. For "Because clicking is so 90s"., a Natural user interface controllable only with gestures and voice, he received the Webby Award in 2010. In 2012, he founded the interdisciplinary studio KASUGA, which is active in the experimental field of design, interaction and sound and develops audio-visual installations, integrated interactions systems and contemporary media art pieces. The work of Andreas Lutz has been exhibited at The National Art Center, Tokyo, the Center for Art and Media Karlsruhe, the OpenArt Biennale in Örebro (Sweden) and won the Excellence Award at the 19th Japan Media Arts Festival, Japan, the iF Design Award, Germany and an Honorary Mention at the Prix Ars Electronica, Austria.

== Selected works, exhibitions and performances ==
=== Works ===
- 2009: Because clicking is so 90s, Web application
- 2014: Wutbürger, Video installation
- 2016: Hypergradient, Kinetic installation
- 2017: Dameon LED, Light installation
- 2018: Offset XYZ, Kinetic sculpture
- 2019: Soft Takeover, Kinetic sculpture
- 2019: Binary Supremacy, Audio-visual live performance
- 2020: Monolith YW, Kinetic sculpture
- 2022: Abstract Language Model (Live), Audio-visual live performance
- 2023: Abstract Language Model (Sync), Audio-visual installation
- 2024: Universal Interface, Audio-visual performance with sculptural element

=== Solo exhibitions ===
- 2017: Festival de la Imágen, Soundscapes, Manizales / Colombia
- 2017: Galerie Mazzoli, I_AM, Berlin / Germany
- 2019: transmediale / CTM Festival, Vorspiel, Berlin / Germany
- 2024: Festival ZERO1, Cultures numériques, La Rochelle
- 2024: Medialab Matadero, Mentes Sintéticas, Madrid
- 2024: Maison de Rhénanie-Palatinat, Dijon
- 2024: Un Singe en Hiver, Dijon

=== Group exhibitions ===
- 2013: ZKM Karlsruhe, AppArtAward Highlights for Fairgrounds Night, Karlsruhe
- 2015: KOBE Biennale, Suki, Kobe
- 2016: Nuit Blanche, European Quarter, Brussels
- 2017: ISEA2017, Bio-creation and peace, Manizales / Colombia
- 2017: FILE Festival, Galeria de Arte do Sesi, Sao Paulo
- 2018: Goethe-Institut Italien, Dell’abitare incerto, Rome
- 2018: ROHM Theatre Kyoto, Ghost, Kyoto
- 2019: Semibreve Festival, Semibreve Award, Braga (Portugal)
- 2019: Stereolux, Scopitone, Nantes
- 2020: Luch Festival, New audio-visual art, Yekaterinburg
- 2021: York Art Gallery, Aesthetica, York
- 2022: Karachi Biennale, KB22, Karachi
- 2022: Times Art Museum, Wavelength, Beijing
- 2023: Sónar Barcelona, Sónar+D, Barcelona
- 2024: Sónar Istanbul, Zorlu PSM, Istanbul

=== Performances ===
- 2016: Spektrum Berlin, Berlin
- 2017: Festival de la Imágen, Manizales
- 2018: transmediale / CTM Festival Vorspiel, Berlin
- 2019: Stereolux Scopitone, Nantes
- 2019: PRECTXE Digital Art Festival, Bucheon
- 2021: Athens Digital Arts Festival, Athens
- 2023: Open Source Art Festival, Sopot
- 2024: Medialab Matadero, Madrid
- 2024: WeSA AudioVisual Festival, Jeju

== Discography ==
- Fairgrounds Night (Kasuga Records; 2008)
- Almost (Motor Music; 2011)
- Zwölftonform (Kasuga Records; 2016)
- Daemon#001 with Hansi Raber (Kasuga Records; 2016)
- Daemon#002 with Hansi Raber (Kasuga Records; 2017)
- Daemon#003 with Hansi Raber (Kasuga Records; 2018)
- Binary Supremacy (Kasuga Records; 2018)
- Daemon#004 with Hansi Raber (Kasuga Records; 2018)
- Daemon#005 with Hansi Raber (Kasuga Records; 2019)
- Dyad (Kasuga Records; 2020)
- Abstract Language Model (Kasuga Records; 2023)
- Aura Trans (Kasuga Records; 2025)
