= Negative Positive Angler =

Japanese anime television series

- Key visual

ネガポジアングラー (Negapoji Angurā)
- Genre: Sports (recreational fishing)
- Created by: Kadokawa Corporation
- Anime television series
- Directed by: Yutaka Uemura
- Written by: Tomohiro Suzuki
- Music by: Tomoki Kikuya
- Studio: NUT
- Licensed by: Crunchyroll
- Original network: AT-X, Tokyo MX, KBS Kyoto, SUN, BS NTV
- Original run: October 3, 2024 – December 19, 2024
- Episodes: 12
- icon

Negative Positive Angler (ネガポジアングラー, Negapoji Angurā) is an original Japanese anime television series produced by NUT. It is directed by Yutaka Uemura, written by Tomohiro Suzuki, and features character designs by Hiromi Taniguchi, and music composed by Tomoki Kikuya. The series aired from October 3 to December 19, 2024, on AT-X and other networks. The opening theme song is "Ito" (イト, Thread), performed by Van de Shop, while the ending theme song is "Shōnin Yokkyū" (承認欲求, Attention-Seeking), performed by 96Neko. Crunchyroll streamed the series.

== Plot ==
The series follows Tsunehiro Sasaki, a university student who was recently diagnosed with a terminal illness and is given two years to live. After accidentally falling into the sea, he forms a friendship with his rescuer Hana Ayukawa, whom together with her friend Takaaki Tsutsujimori, develops an interest in fishing.

== Characters ==
Tsunehiro Sasaki (佐々木 常宏, Sasaki Tsunehiro)
Voiced by: Mutsuki Iwanaka
Hana Ayukawa (鮎川 ハナ, Ayukawa Hana)
Voiced by: Fairouz Ai
Takaaki Tsutsujimori (躑躅森 貴明, Tsutsujimori Takaaki)
Voiced by: Kaito Ishikawa
Kozue Nishimori (西森 こずえ, Nishimori Kozue)
Voiced by: Rio Tsuchiya
Machida (町田)
Voiced by: Hiroshi Tsuchida
Fujishiro (藤代)
Voiced by: Masashi Sugawara
Ice (アイス, Aisu)
Voiced by: Haruka Tomatsu
Alua (アルア, Arua)
Voiced by: Yūya Hirose

== Episodes ==
No.	Title	Directed by	Storyboarded by	Original release date
1	"Negative Angler"; Transliteration: "Negatibu Angurā" (Japanese: ネガティブアングラー)	Yutaka Uemura	Yutaka Uemura & Hiromi Taniguchi	October 3, 2024
2	"Fishing in the Pool"; Transliteration: "Pūru de Tsuri de" (Japanese: プールで釣りで)	Kentarō Kawajiri	Kentarō Kawajiri	October 10, 2024
3	"Regrets"; Transliteration: "Kokoro Nokori" (Japanese: 心のこり)	Takayuki Yamamoto	Takayuki Yamamoto, Yoshifumi Sueda, Satoshi Matsubara & Satoshi Miura	October 17, 2024
4	"Is Fishing Hard?"; Transliteration: "Tsuri tte Muzukashī?" (Japanese: 釣りって難しい？)	Satoshi Matsubara	Satoshi Matsubara	October 24, 2024
5	"Money-Wasting Angler"; Transliteration: "Sanzai Angurā" (Japanese: 散財アングラー)	Fumie Muroi	Fumie Muroi	October 31, 2024
6	"Tai Lover"	Satoshi Miura	Satoshi Miura	November 7, 2024
7	"Who Is This Guy?"; Transliteration: "Kono Hito Nanimono?" (Japanese: この人何者？)	Toshiki Fukushima & Kazuya Iwata	Takumi Shibata	November 14, 2024
8	"A Family's Relationship, a Child's Growth"; Transliteration: "Oyako no Kankei, Kodomo no Seichō" (Japanese: 親子の関係、子供の成長)	Satoshi Matsubara	Satoshi Matsubara	November 21, 2024
9	"Hot Pot Party"; Transliteration: "Nabe Pa" (Japanese: 鍋パ)	Satoshi Miura	Hiroyasu Aoki	November 28, 2024
10	"Tsunehiro and Takaaki"; Transliteration: "Tsunehiro to Takāki" (Japanese: 常宏と貴明)	Kentarō Kawajiri	Kentarō Kawajiri & Shinichi Kurita	December 5, 2024
11	"I Have to Tell Him"; Transliteration: "Iwa Nakyai Kenai" (Japanese: 言わなきゃいけない)	Takumi Shibata	Takumi Shibata	December 12, 2024
12	"Negative Positive Angler"; Transliteration: "Negapoji Angurā" (Japanese: ネガポジアングラー)	Takayuki Yamamoto & Shunpei Umemoto	Takumi Shibata, Toshiro Fujii, Yasushi Uemura & Yoshifumi Sueda	December 19, 2024
