= Gaku: Minna no Yama (film) =

- Film poster
- Directed by: Osamu Katayama
- Screenplay by: Tomoko Yoshida
- Based on: Gaku: Minna no Yama by Shinichi Ishizuka
- Produced by: Hisashi Usui
- Music by: Naoki Satō
- Distributed by: Toho
- Release date: 7 May 2011 (Japan)
- Running time: 126 minutes
- Country: Japan
- Language: Japanese

Gaku: Minna no Yama (岳-ガク-, Take - gaku -) is a 2011 Japanese film. It is based on a manga of the same name, and directed by Osamu Katayama. It debuted in Japanese cinemas on 7 May 2011.

== Cast ==
- Shun Oguri as Sanpo Shimazaki
- Masami Nagasawa as Kumi Shiina
- Kuranosuke Sasaki as Masato Noda
- Takuya Ishida as Toshio Akutsu
- Yoshie Ichige as Ayako Tanimura
- Atsuro Watabe as Hidenori Maki
- Toshihiro Yashiba as Yohei Zama
- Kyosuke Yabe as Shunichi Ando
- Manabu Hamada as Seki
- Suzunosuke as Moriya
- Hiroyuki Onoue as a man in distress
- Kazuki Namioka as Sanpo's friend
- Ren Mori as Makoto Aoki
- Bengal as the victim's father
- Takashi Ukaji as Shuji Yokoi
- Kaito Kobayashi as Naota Yokoi
- Ken Mitsuishi as Ichiro Kaji
- Noriko Nakagoshi as Yoko Kaji
- Ken Ishiguro as Kyozo Shiina

== Reception ==
=== Box office ===
This film was the highest-grossing film on its debut weekend of May 7–8, grossing a total of US$3,258,511.
