= The Gene of AI =

Japanese manga series

- First tankōbon volume cover

AIの遺電子 (AI no Idenshi)
- Genre: Science fiction
- Manga
- Written by: Kyūri Yamada
- Published by: Akita Shoten
- Imprint: Shōnen Champion Comics
- Magazine: Weekly Shōnen Champion
- Original run: November 5, 2015 – August 24, 2017
- Volumes: 8
- Manga

AI no Idenshi: Red Queen
- Written by: Kyūri Yamada
- Published by: Akita Shoten
- Imprint: Shōnen Champion Comics
- Magazine: Bessatsu Shōnen Champion
- Original run: October 12, 2017 – June 12, 2019
- Volumes: 5
- Manga

AI no Idenshi: Blue Age
- Written by: Kyūri Yamada
- Published by: Akita Shoten
- Imprint: Shōnen Champion Comics
- Magazine: Bessatsu Shōnen Champion
- Original run: July 10, 2020 – October 11, 2024
- Volumes: 9
- Anime television series
- Directed by: Yuzo Sato
- Written by: Ryunosuke Kingetsu
- Music by: Takashi Ohmama; Natsumi Tabuchi
- Studio: Madhouse (Note: Animation production assistance (アニメーション制作協力) for all episodes provided by DR Movie.)
- Licensed by: Crunchyroll; SA/SEA: Muse Communication
- Original network: MBS, TBS, BS-TBS, AT-X
- Original run: July 8, 2023 – September 30, 2023
- Episodes: 12
- icon

The Gene of AI (Japanese: AIの遺電子, Hepburn: AI no Idenshi) is a Japanese manga series written and illustrated by Kyūri Yamada. It was serialized in Akita Shoten's shōnen manga magazine Weekly Shōnen Champion from November 2015 to August 2017, with its chapters collected into eight tankōbon volumes. A sequel manga, AI no Idenshi: Red Queen, was serialized in Bessatsu Shōnen Champion from October 2017 to June 2019, and has been collected into five volumes. A third series, AI no Idenshi: Blue Age, was serialized in Bessatsu Shōnen Champion from July 2020 to October 2024, and has been collected into nine volumes. An anime television series adaptation produced by Madhouse aired from July to September 2023.

== Plot ==
The Gene of AI delves into a futuristic world where humanoids, advanced AI entities with human-like traits, form a notable portion of the population. The tale unfolds around Dr. Hikaru Sudo, a devoted physician specializing in treating these humanoids, who secretly partakes in unauthorized medical practices to alleviate their unique ailments. Known by the pseudonym Moggadeet, his clandestine operations steer him into a life of duality.

As humanoids experience 'illnesses' akin to humans, albeit with divergent treatment approaches, the narrative navigates the murky ethical waters of this human-humanoid coexistence, especially when new, peculiar diseases sprout from this shared living arrangement. Dr. Sudo finds himself at the heart of moral dilemmas, witnessing first-hand the tribulations faced by the AI beings, thus challenging the conventional boundaries of legality and ethics in this advanced yet complex society. Through Dr. Sudo's eyes, the story probes the intertwined destinies of humans and artificial intelligence, painting a compelling portrayal of empathy, understanding, and the quest for coexistence in an evolving world.

== Characters ==
Hikaru Sudō (須堂 光, Sudō Hikaru)
Voiced by: Takeo Ōtsuka
Risa Higuchi (樋口 リサ, Higuchi Risa)
Voiced by: Yume Miyamoto
Jay (ジェイ, Jei)
Voiced by: Mutsuki Iwanaka
Kaoru (カオル)
Voiced by: Natsumi Takamori
Michi
Voiced by: Yuka Terasaki

== Media ==
=== Manga ===
Written and illustrated by Kyūri Yamada, The Gene of AI was serialized in Akita Shoten's Weekly Shōnen Champion magazine from November 5, 2015, to August 24, 2017. It has been collected into eight tankōbon volumes, published from April 2016 to November 2017. A sequel manga, titled AI no Idenshi: Red Queen (AIの遺電子 RED QUEEN), was serialized in Bessatsu Shōnen Champion from October 12, 2017, to June 12, 2019. Five tankōbon volumes were published from April 2018 to August 2019. A third series, titled AI no Idenshi: Blue Age (AIの遺電子 Blue Age), was serialized in Bessatsu Shōnen Champion from July 10, 2020, to October 11, 2024. As of December 2024, nine tankōbon volumes have been released.

==== Volumes ====
No.	Japanese release date	Japanese ISBN
1	April 8, 2016	978-4-253-22096-5
2	July 8, 2016	978-4-253-22097-2
3	October 7, 2016	978-4-253-22098-9
4	December 8, 2016	978-4-253-22099-6
5	March 8, 2017	978-4-253-22100-9
6	June 8, 2017	978-4-253-22114-6
7	August 8, 2017	978-4-253-22115-3
8	November 8, 2017	978-4-253-22116-0

===== AI no Idenshi: Red Queen =====
No.	Japanese release date	Japanese ISBN
1	April 6, 2018	978-4-253-21166-6
2	August 8, 2018	978-4-253-21167-3
3	December 7, 2018	978-4-253-21168-0
4	April 8, 2019	978-4-253-21169-7
5	August 8, 2019	978-4-253-21170-3

===== AI no Idenshi: Blue Age =====
No.	Japanese release date	Japanese ISBN
1	April 8, 2021	978-4-253-29161-3
2	August 6, 2021	978-4-253-29162-0
3	January 7, 2022	978-4-253-29163-7
4	July 7, 2022	978-4-253-29164-4
5	December 8, 2022	978-4-253-29165-1
6	June 8, 2023	978-4-253-29166-8
7	November 8, 2023	978-4-253-29167-5
8	July 8, 2024	978-4-253-29168-2
9	December 6, 2024	978-4-253-29169-9

=== Anime ===
An anime television series adaptation was announced on December 8, 2022. It is produced by Madhouse and directed by Yuzo Sato, with scripts written by Ryunosuke Kingetsu, character designs handled by Kei Tsuchiya, who also serves as chief animation director, and music composed by Takashi Ohmama and Natsumi Tabuchi. The series aired from July 8 to September 30, 2023, on the Animeism programming block on MBS and other affiliates. (Note: MBS lists the series premiere at 25:53 JST on July 7, 2023, which is effectively 1:53 a.m. on July 8.) The opening theme song is "No Frontier" by Aile The Shota, while the ending theme song is "Wasurenagusa" (勿忘草; "Forget-me-not") by Greeeen. Crunchyroll streamed the series outside East Asia. Muse Communication has licensed the series in Southeast Asia.

==== Episodes ====
No.	Title	Directed by	Storyboarded by	Original release date
1	"Backup"; Transliteration: "Bakkuappu" (Japanese: バックアップ)	Takahiro Umehara	Yuzo Sato	July 8, 2023
2	"Limits of Growth"; Transliteration: "Seichō Genkai" (Japanese: 成長限界)	Akiko Nakano & Kang tai-sik	Yoshiaki Kawajiri	July 15, 2023 (Note: This episode aired at 2:08 a.m. JST, 15 minutes after the original air time.)
3	"Where the Heart Lies"; Transliteration: "Kokoro no Arika" (Japanese: 心の在処)	Kim min-sun	Yuzo Sato	July 22, 2023
4	"Four Cases"; Transliteration: "Yottsu no Kēsu" (Japanese: 4つのケース)	Kanji Wakabayashi & Ji yang-ho	Ken'ichi Shimizu	July 29, 2023
5	"Tuning"; Transliteration: "Chōritsu" (Japanese: 調律)	Park jae-ik	Yoshiaki Kawajiri	August 5, 2023
6	"Robot"; Transliteration: "Robotto" (Japanese: ロボット)	Akiko Nakano & Yang jeong-hee	Yoshiaki Kawajiri	August 12, 2023 (Note: This episode aired at 1:58 a.m. JST, 5 minutes after the original air time.)
7	"Human"; Transliteration: "Ningen" (Japanese: 人間)	Kim min-sun	Yuzo Sato	August 19, 2023
8	"Confession"; Transliteration: "Kokuhaku" (Japanese: 告白)	Kanji Wakabayashi & Park jae-ik	Ken'ichi Shimizu	September 2, 2023
9	"A Proper Society"; Transliteration: "Tadashii Shakai" (Japanese: 正しい社会)	Akiko Nakano & Ji yang-ho	Ken'ichi Shimizu	September 9, 2023
10	"The Approaching Future"; Transliteration: "Kitarubeki Sekai" (Japanese: 来るべき世界)	Tōru Ishida & Kang ii-gu	Yoshiaki Kawajiri	September 16, 2023
11	"Tu Fui"; Transliteration: "Tū Fī" (Japanese: トゥー・フィー)	Kanji Wakabayashi & Park jae-ik	Yuzo Sato	September 23, 2023
12	"Departure"; Transliteration: "Tabidachi" (Japanese: 旅立ち)	Kang tae-sik	Yuzo Sato	September 30, 2023 (Note: This episode aired at 2:13 a.m. JST, 20 minutes after the original air time.)

== Reception ==
The Gene of AI was ranked 14th in the 2017 edition of Takarajimasha's Kono Manga ga Sugoi! list of top manga for male readers. In 2018, the series won the Excellence Award in the manga division of the 21st Japan Media Arts Festival Awards.
