= Merrily, We Tumble Along =

Japanese manga series

- First tankōbon volume cover

転がる姉弟 (Korogaru Kyōdai)
- Genre: Comedy; Slice of life
- Manga
- Written by: Tsubumi Mori
- Published by: Hero's Inc.
- English publisher: NA: J-Novel Club
- Imprint: Heros Comics Flat
- Magazine: Comiplex
- Original run: August 14, 2020 – present
- Volumes: 8

Merrily, We Tumble Along (転がる姉弟, Korogaru Kyōdai) is a Japanese manga series written and illustrated by Tsubumi Mori. It began serialization on Hero's Inc.'s Comiplex manga website in August 2020.

== Synopsis ==
The series is centered around step-siblings Minato Usami and Koshirō Sakuba. Minato is excited about getting a little brother after her father's remarriage. Likewise, Koshirō is also excited about getting a big sister after his mother's remarriage. When Minato and Koshirō eventually meet each other, they're different from how they imagined each other to be.

== Characters ==
Minato Usami (宇佐美みなと, Usami Minato)
Voiced by: Rie Mabuchi (voice drama)
Koshirō Sakuba (作場光志郎, Sakuba Koshirō)
Voiced by: Eriko Nakamura (voice drama)

== Media ==
=== Manga ===
Written and illustrated by Tsubumi Mori, Merrily, We Tumble Along began serialization on Hero's Inc.'s Comiplex manga website on August 14, 2020. Its chapters have been compiled into eight tankōbon volumes as of September 2026.

In November 2026, J-Novel Club announced it had licensed the series for English publication.

No.	Release date	ISBN
1	January 15, 2021	978-4-86468-775-1
2	August 12, 2021	978-4-86468-823-9
3	March 15, 2022	978-4-86468-874-1
4	September 29, 2022	978-4-86468-129-2
5	September 28, 2023	978-4-86468-202-2
6	September 28, 2024	978-4-86468-291-6
7	September 16, 2025	978-4-86805-104-6
8	September 15, 2026	978-4-86805-223-4

=== Other ===
A voice drama adaptation was uploaded to the Comiplex YouTube channel on August 19, 2021. It featured performances from Rie Mabuchi and Eriko Nakamura.

== Reception ==
The series, alongside Attack on Titan, was ranked sixteenth in the 2022 edition of Takarajimasha's Kono Manga ga Sugoi! guidebook list of the best manga for male readers. The series won a New Face Award in the Manga Division at the 25th Japan Media Arts Festival in 2022. The series also won the grand prize at the 2023 Bros Comic Awards. The series was ranked fifth in the 2025 Da Vinci Book of the Year ranking.
