= Noise (2017 manga) =

Japanese manga series

- First tankōbon volume cover

ノイズ (Noizu)
- Genre: Thriller
- Manga
- Written by: Tetsuya Tsutsui
- Published by: Shueisha
- Magazine: Grand Jump
- Original run: December 6, 2017 – January 22, 2020
- Volumes: 3
- Live-action film
- Directed by: Ryūichi Hiroki
- Written by: Shō Kataoka
- Music by: Otomo Yoshihide
- Studio: Warner Bros. Pictures
- Released: January 28, 2022
- icon

Noise (Japanese: ノイズ, Hepburn: Noizu) (stylized as 【noise】) is a Japanese manga series written and illustrated by Tetsuya Tsutsui. It was serialized in Shueisha's seinen manga magazine Grand Jump from December 2017 to January 2020, with its chapters collected in three tankōbon volumes. A live-action film adaptation premiered in January 2022.

== Characters ==
Keita Izumi
Portrayed by: Tatsuya Fujiwara
Jun Tanabe
Portrayed by: Kenichi Matsuyama
Shinichirō Moriya
Portrayed by: Ryunosuke Kamiki
Mutsuo Omisaka
Portrayed by: Daichi Watanabe
Kana Izumi
Portrayed by: Haru Kuroki
Tsutomu Hatakeyama
Portrayed by: Masatoshi Nagase
Chihiro Aoki
Portrayed by: Ayumi Ito
Shōichi Yokota
Portrayed by: Yoshi Sakō
Jirō Noge
Portrayed by: Takaya Sakoda
Yoshiaki Sakai
Portrayed by: Kazuki Namioka
Shōkichi Yokota
Portrayed by: Akira Emoto
Hanae Shōji
Portrayed by: Kimiko Yo
Masa Okazaki
Portrayed by: Susumu Terajima
Hitomi Moriya
Portrayed by: Mayu Tsuruta

== Media ==
=== Manga ===
Written and illustrated by Tetsuya Tsutsui, Noise was serialized in Shueisha's seinen manga magazine Grand Jump from December 6, 2017, to January 22, 2020. Shueisha collected its chapters in three tankōbon volumes, released from May 18, 2018, to March 19, 2020.

==== Volumes ====
No.	Release date	ISBN
1	May 18, 2018	978-4-08-891010-9
2	March 19, 2019	978-4-08-891104-5
3	March 19, 2020	978-4-08-891410-7

=== Live-action film ===
A live-action film adaptation premiered on January 28, 2022. It was directed by Ryūichi Hiroki, with script by Shō Kataoka, and music composed by Otomo Yoshihide.
