= Blue Giant (manga) =

Japanese manga series

- First tankōbon volume cover, featuring Dai Miyamoto
- Genre: Drama; Music
- Manga
- Written by: Shinichi Ishizuka
- Published by: Shogakukan
- English publisher: NA: Seven Seas Entertainment
- Imprint: Big Comics Special
- Magazine: Big Comic
- Original run: May 10, 2013 – August 25, 2016
- Volumes: 10
- Manga

Blue Giant Supreme
- Written by: Shinichi Ishizuka
- Published by: Shogakukan
- Imprint: Big Comics Special
- Magazine: Big Comic
- Original run: September 10, 2016 – April 25, 2020
- Volumes: 11
- Manga

Blue Giant Explorer
- Written by: Shinichi Ishizuka
- Published by: Shogakukan
- Imprint: Big Comics Special
- Magazine: Big Comic
- Original run: May 25, 2020 – May 10, 2023
- Volumes: 9
- Anime film
- Directed by: Yuzuru Tachikawa
- Produced by: Eri Isobe; Mikito Bizenjima
- Written by: Number 8
- Music by: Hiromi Uehara
- Studio: NUT
- Licensed by: NA: GKIDS
- Released: February 17, 2023
- Runtime: 120 minutes
- Manga

Blue Giant Momentum
- Written by: Shinichi Ishizuka
- Published by: Shogakukan
- Imprint: Big Comics Special
- Magazine: Big Comic
- Original run: July 25, 2023 – present
- Volumes: 9
- icon

Blue Giant is a Japanese jazz-themed manga series written and illustrated by Shinichi Ishizuka. It was serialized in Shogakukan's Big Comic from May 2013 to August 2016, with its chapters compiled in ten tankōbon volumes. A sequel, titled Blue Giant Supreme was serialized in Big Comic from September 2016 to April 2020, with its chapters compiled in eleven tankōbon. A third series, titled Blue Giant Explorer, was serialized in Big Comic from May 2020 to May 2023, with its chapters compiled in nine tankōbon. A fourth series, titled Blue Giant Momentum, began in Big Comic in July 2023. In North America, the manga has been licensed for English release by Seven Seas Entertainment, which is publishing it in a two-in-one omnibus edition, and the first volume was released in November 2020.

An anime film adaptation produced by NUT opened in Japan in February 2023.

By August 2020, the manga had over 5.8 million copies in circulation. In 2017, Blue Giant won the 62nd Shogakukan Manga Award in the General category and the 20th Japan Media Arts Festival Award.

== Synopsis ==
Dai Miyamoto, a high school student living in Sendai City, Miyagi Prefecture, has a straight personality, but he was living a student life without knowing what he wanted to do in the future. One day, he listened to a jazz song and became interested in it. He starts working part-time to buy a saxophone. His brother, Masayuki, who knew about it, bought a saxophone with a loan and gave it to him as a gift. Dai, who practiced the saxophone on the river bank after school every day, was invited to perform live by the owner of a musical instrument shop he met while buying reeds. He was yelled at by a regular customer that it was just loud and noisy, and he got off the stage in a daze and went home. After that, as he continues his daily practice, the master of the jazz bar where Dai has appeared introduces Yui, a music class instructor. Although he gave a lot of failing marks to Dai's performance, he was invited to come to his house next time, and Dai willingly accepted. By attending classes, Dai's performance increased in power, and his delicate side also improved. After graduating from high school, Dai decides to move to Tokyo to become a saxophone player. He dedicates himself to mastering jazz with the goal of becoming the greatest player in the world.

== Characters ==
Dai Miyamoto (宮本 大, Miyamoto Dai)
Voiced by: Yuki Yamada
Yukinori Sawabe (沢辺 雪祈, Sawabe Yukinori)
Voiced by: Shotaro Mamiya
Shunji Tamada (玉田 俊二, Tamada Shunji)
Voiced by: Amane Okayama

== Media ==
=== Manga ===
Written and illustrated by Shinichi Ishizuka, Blue Giant was serialized in Shogakukan's Big Comic from May 10, 2013, to August 25, 2016. Shogakukan collected its chapters in ten tankōbon volumes, released from November 29, 2013, to March 10, 2017.

A second series, titled Blue Giant Supreme, was serialized in Big Comic from September 10, 2016, to April 25, 2020. Eleven tankōbon volumes were released by Shogakukan from March 10, 2017, to October 30, 2020.

A third series, titled Blue Giant Explorer, was serialized in Big Comic from May 25, 2020, to May 10, 2023. Nine tankōbon volumes were released from October 30, 2020, to February 29, 2024.

A fourth series, set in New York City and titled Blue Giant Momentum, began serialization in Big Comic on July 25, 2023. Nine tankōbon volumes have been released as of October 30, 2026.

In North America, Seven Seas Entertainment announced the English release of Blue Giant in February 2020. The manga was released in five two-in-one omnibus volumes from November 10, 2020, to March 22, 2022.

==== Blue Giant ====
No.	Original release date	Original ISBN	English release date	English ISBN
1	November 29, 2013	978-4-09-185678-4	November 10, 2020	978-1-64505-864-9
2	March 28, 2014	978-4-09-186245-7	November 10, 2020	978-1-64505-864-9
3	July 30, 2014	978-4-09-186460-4	April 20, 2021	978-1-64505-865-6
4	December 26, 2014	978-4-09-186828-2	April 20, 2021	978-1-64505-865-6
5	February 27, 2015	978-4-09-186850-3	July 27, 2021	978-1-64827-248-6
6	July 30, 2015	978-4-09-187257-9	July 27, 2021	978-1-64827-248-6
7	November 30, 2015	978-4-09-187406-1	December 21, 2021	978-1-64827-347-6
8	March 30, 2016	978-4-09-187585-3	December 21, 2021	978-1-64827-347-6
9	September 9, 2016	978-4-09-187828-1	March 22, 2022	978-1-63858-158-1
10	March 10, 2017	978-4-09-189460-1	March 22, 2022	978-1-63858-158-1

==== Blue Giant Supreme ====
No.	Japanese release date	Japanese ISBN
1	March 10, 2017	978-4-09-189467-0
2	June 30, 2017	978-4-09-189585-1
3	October 30, 2017	978-4-09-189743-5
4	February 23, 2018	978-4-09-189843-2
5	June 29, 2018	978-4-09-860022-9
6	October 30, 2018	978-4-09-860169-1
7	February 28, 2019	978-4-09-860265-0
8	June 28, 2019	978-4-09-860352-7
9	October 30, 2019	978-4-09-860499-9
10	February 28, 2020	978-4-09-860583-5
11	October 30, 2020	978-4-09-860811-9

==== Blue Giant Explorer ====
No.	Japanese release date	Japanese ISBN
1	October 30, 2020	978-4-09-860813-3
2	February 26, 2021	978-4-09-861003-7
3	June 30, 2021	978-4-09-861100-3
4	October 29, 2021	978-4-09-861177-5
5	February 28, 2022	978-4-09-861277-2
6	June 30, 2022	978-4-09-861369-4
7	October 28, 2022	978-4-09-861466-0
8	February 10, 2023	978-4-09-861638-1
9	February 29, 2024	978-4-09-862749-3

==== Blue Giant Momentum ====
No.	Japanese release date	Japanese ISBN
1	February 29, 2024	978-4-09-862750-9
2	June 28, 2024	978-4-09-863013-4
3	October 30, 2024	978-4-09-863119-3
4	February 28, 2025	978-4-09-863372-2
5	June 30, 2025	978-4-09-863475-0
6	October 30, 2025	978-4-09-863676-1
7	February 27, 2026	978-4-09-863853-6
8	June 30, 2026	978-4-09-864054-6
9	October 30, 2026	978-4-09-864162-8

=== Film ===
An anime film adaptation produced by NUT was announced on October 21, 2021. It was directed by Yuzuru Tachikawa, based on a screenplay by Number 8, with character design by Yūichi Takahashi (who also served as the film's chief animation director), and original music and soundtrack composed by Hiromi Uehara. It was originally set to premiere in 2022, but was shifted to February 17, 2023. The film features minor plot adaptations, including a scene in which the band Jass performs with pianist Yukinori Sawabe following an accident that injures his right hand.

The film is licensed in North America by GKIDS. The Japan Society hosted the premiere in New York on October 6, 2023, in advance of screenings at North American theaters on October 8 and 9. It was released on Blu-ray and digital platforms on April 30, 2024.

== Reception ==
By August 2020, the manga had over 5.8 million copies in circulation. In 2018, the second volume of Blue Giant Supreme had 200,000 copies in circulation. In 2020, the eighth volume of Blue Giant Supreme had 200,000 copies in circulation.

Blue Giant was nominated for the eighth and ninth Manga Taishō in 2015 and 2016, respectively. The series ranked fifteenth on Kono Manga ga Sugoi! guidebook list of 2016 top manga for male readers. Blue Giant was nominated for the Yomiuri Shimbun's Sugoi Japan Award 2017. In 2017, the manga won the 62nd Shogakukan Manga Award in the General category, and won the 20th Japan Media Arts Festival Award. In 2018, the manga was nominated for the 22nd Tezuka Osamu Cultural Prize. Blue Giant Supreme won the Mandō Kobayashi Manga Grand Prix 2018, created by comedian and manga enthusiast Kendo Kobayashi. It ranked 41st on the 2018 "Book of the Year" list by Da Vinci magazine, and ranked 45th on the 2019 list.

Blue Giant was picked as a nominee for "Best Comic" at the 46th Angoulême International Comics Festival held in 2019; it was nominated in the same category for the 51st edition, held in 2024. Blue Giant was nominated for the French 14th ACBD's Prix Asie de la Critique 2020.

On the review aggregator website Rotten Tomatoes, Blue Giant holds an approval rating of 100% based on 15 reviews. The film was nominated for Best Film at the 8th Crunchyroll Anime Awards. It was also nominated at the 47th Japan Academy Film Prize for Best Animation Film, while Hiromi Uehara won Best Music for her work.
