= TsumaSho =

Japanese manga series

- First tankōbon volume cover

妻、小学生になる。 (Tsuma, Shōgakusei ni Naru)
- Genre: Drama; Fantasy
- Manga
- Written by: Yayū Murata
- Published by: Houbunsha
- Magazine: Weekly Manga Times
- Original run: July 27, 2018 – December 2, 2022
- Volumes: 14
- Television drama
- Directed by: Toshio Tsuboi; Takeyoshi Yamamoto; Maiko Ōuchi; Naoki Katō
- Produced by: Yoshihiko Nakai; Chie Masuda
- Written by: Satomi Ōshima
- Music by: Pascals
- Licensed by: Netflix
- Original network: TBS
- Original run: January 21, 2022 – March 25, 2022
- Episodes: 10
- Manga

Hatsukoi Aite no Kimi wa Dare?
- Written by: Yayū Murata
- Published by: Houbunsha
- Magazine: Weekly Manga Times
- Original run: March 8, 2024 – May 10, 2024
- Volumes: 1
- Anime television series
- Directed by: Noriyuki Abe
- Produced by: Yousuke Tamura; Kazuya Kuwahara; Emiko Iijima; Tomoyuki Oowadda; Hidetada Soga; En Yoshida; Yuuichirou Ootani
- Written by: Sawako Hirabayashi
- Music by: Hiroko Yamasaki
- Studio: Studio Signpost
- Licensed by: Crunchyroll; SA/SEA: Medialink
- Original network: Tokyo MX, BS11, SUN, AT-X
- Original run: October 6, 2024 – December 22, 2024
- Episodes: 12
- icon

TsumaSho (Japanese: 妻、小学生になる。, Hepburn: Tsuma, Shōgakusei ni Naru; lit. 'My Wife Will Become an Elementary School Student') is a Japanese manga series written and illustrated by Yayū Murata. It was originally a one-shot published in Houbunsha's seinen manga magazine Weekly Manga Times in April 2018, before being serialized in the same magazine from July 2018 to December 2022. The series has been collected into fourteen tankōbon volumes. A television drama adaptation aired from January to March 2022. An anime television series adaptation produced by Studio Signpost aired from October to December 2024.

== Plot ==
After the untimely death of his wife, Takae, Keisuke Niijima becomes a shell of his former self. He closes himself off, wallowing in his own despair, not paying any attention to his now adult daughter, Mai. One night while eating store-bought dinners, they answer the door to an elementary school student named Marika Shiraishi, who claims to be the reincarnation of Takae. Keisuke initially dismisses this until Marika reveals certain details that only Takae would have known, proving that she is in fact, Takae in an elementary school student's body. Takae immediately scolds both of them for living such unfulfilling, sad lives and helps them get back on track.

== Characters ==
Keisuke Niijima (新島 圭介, Niijima Keisuke)
Voiced by: Daisuke Hirakawa
Portrayed by: Shinichi Tsutsumi
Takae Niijima (新島 貴恵, Niijima Takae) / Marika Shiraishi (白石 万理華, Shiraishi Marika)
Voiced by: Aoi Yūki
Portrayed by: Yuriko Ishida (Takae), Nono Maida (Marika)
Mai Niijima (新島 麻衣, Niijima Mai)
Voiced by: Maiko Nomura
Portrayed by: Aju Makita
Konomi Moriya (守屋 好美, Moriya Konomi)
Voiced by: Kana Okazaki
Portrayed by: Misato Morita
Chika Shiraishi (白石 千嘉, Shiraishi Chika)
Voiced by: Sachiko Kojima
Portrayed by: Yō Yoshida
Renji Aikawa (愛川 蓮司, Aikawa Renji)
Voiced by: Mutsuki Iwanaka
Portrayed by: Yosuke Sugino

== Media ==
=== Manga ===
Written and illustrated by Yayū Murata, TsumaSho was initially a one-shot published in Houbunsha's seinen manga magazine Weekly Manga Times on April 27, 2018. It was serialized in the same magazine from July 27, 2018, to December 2, 2022. Fourteen tankōbon volumes were published from April 2019 to March 2023.

A spin-off manga titled Hatsukoi Aite no Kimi wa Dare? (初恋相手の君は誰？; lit. 'Who Are You, My First Love?') was serialized in the same magazine from March 8 to May 10, 2024. It was published in a single tankōbon volume on October 16 of the same year.

==== Volumes ====
No.	Japanese release date	Japanese ISBN
1	April 16, 2019	978-4-83-223671-4
2	June 13, 2019	978-4-83-223681-3
3	October 16, 2019	978-4-83-223698-1
4	February 14, 2020	978-4-83-223714-8
5	June 16, 2020	978-4-83-223748-3
6	October 15, 2020	978-4-83-223773-5
7	February 16, 2021	978-4-83-223804-6
8	July 15, 2021	978-4-83-223842-8
9	January 15, 2022	978-4-83-223884-8
10	February 16, 2022	978-4-83-223893-0
11	March 16, 2022	978-4-83-223901-2
12	July 14, 2022	978-4-83-223929-6
13	November 16, 2022	978-4-83-223953-1
14	March 16, 2023	978-4-83-223977-7

=== Drama ===
A television drama adaptation was announced on September 17, 2021. It was directed by Toshio Tsuboi, Takeyoshi Yamamoto, Maiko Ōuchi, and Naoki Katō, based on a screenplay by Satomi Ōshima, and the music was composed by the instrumental band Pascals. Yoshihiko Nakai and Chie Masuda served as the producers. The series aired on TBS from January 21 to March 25, 2022. Yuga performed the theme song "Tomoshibi" (灯火). Netflix is streaming the series.

Yako, Shōgakusei ni Naru, a spin-off series featuring an original story, was released on the Japanese streaming service Paravi from February 11 to March 25, 2022. Hidetaka Sakamoto, Hiroyuki Tamekawa, and Saya Hirosawa directed the series from a screenplay by Masashi Suwa.

=== Anime ===
An anime adaptation was announced on March 16, 2023. It was later confirmed to be a television series produced by Studio Signpost and directed by Noriyuki Abe, with scripts supervised and written by Sawako Hirabayashi, characters designed by Narihito Sekikawa, and music composed by Hiroko Yamasaki. It aired from October 6 to December 22, 2024, on Tokyo MX and other networks. The opening theme song is "Ai no Reunion" (アイノリユニオン; lit. 'Reunion of Love') performed by Pachae, while the ending theme song is "Hidamari" performed by Ms. Ooja. Crunchyroll streamed the series. Medialink licensed the series in South and Southeast Asia for streaming on Ani-One Asia's YouTube channel.

==== Episodes ====
No.	Title	Directed by (Note: Production staff information is taken from the ending credits of each episode.)	Written by	Storyboarded by	Original release date
1	"A Family Again"; Transliteration: "Kazoku, Futatabi" (Japanese: 家族、ふたたび。)	Noriyuki Abe	Sawako Hirabayashi	Noriyuki Abe	October 6, 2024
2	"Right Now"; Transliteration: "Datte, Ima wa" (Japanese: だって、いまは。)	Itoko Nagai	Sawako Hirabayashi	Itoko Nagai	October 13, 2024 (Note: From Episode 2, episodes were released on U-Next, Anime Hōdai, Crunchyroll, and Ani-One Asia one week before their televised airings.)
3	"One Step Forward"; Transliteration: "Ippo, Fumidashite" (Japanese: 一歩、ふみだして。)	Taiji Kawanishi	Sawako Hirabayashi	Hiroyuki Fukushima	October 20, 2024
4	"Chatting Together"; Transliteration: "Futari wa, Katarau" (Japanese: ふたりは、語らう。)	Yūki Morita	Sawako Hirabayashi	Yūki Morita	October 27, 2024
5	"Mother and Family"; Transliteration: "Haha to, Kazoku" (Japanese: 母と、家族。)	Masayuki Matsumoto	Sawako Hirabayashi	Hiroyuki Fukushima	November 3, 2024
6	"Memories, Creaking"; Transliteration: "Omoi, Kishin de" (Japanese: 想い、きしんで。)	Takeru Ogiwara	Sawako Hirabayashi	Takeru Ogiwara	November 10, 2024
7	"A Sign of Happiness"; Transliteration: "Shiawase no, Kizashi" (Japanese: しあわせの、兆し。)	Nene Nimura	Sawako Hirabayashi	Noriyuki Abe	November 17, 2024
8	"Who Are You?"; Transliteration: "Anata, Dare?" (Japanese: あなた、誰？)	Ema Saitō & Mitsutoshi Satō	Sawako Hirabayashi	Ema Saitō	November 24, 2024
9	"I Want to Share How I Feel"; Transliteration: "Tsutaetai, Kono Kimochi" (Japanese: 伝えたい、この気持ち。)	Nozomi Fukui	Sawako Hirabayashi	Nozomi Fukui	December 1, 2024
10	"If That Is Your Wish"; Transliteration: "Sore ga, Negai Nara" (Japanese: それが、願いなら。)	Yūki Morita	Sawako Hirabayashi	Yūki Morita	December 8, 2024
11	"Love You More Than Anyone"; Transliteration: "Dare yori mo, Aishiteru" (Japanese: だれよりも、愛してる。)	Taiji Kawanishi	Sawako Hirabayashi	Hiroyuki Fukushima	December 15, 2024
12	"One Moment"; Transliteration: "Sono Isshun o," (Japanese: その一瞬を、)	Nene Nimura	Sawako Hirabayashi	Noriyuki Abe	December 22, 2024

== Reception ==
In 2019, TsumaSho ranked 11th at the fifth Next Manga Awards in the print category. By March 2024, the manga had over 3 million copies in circulation.
