= Chico Will Scold You! =

Japanese television program

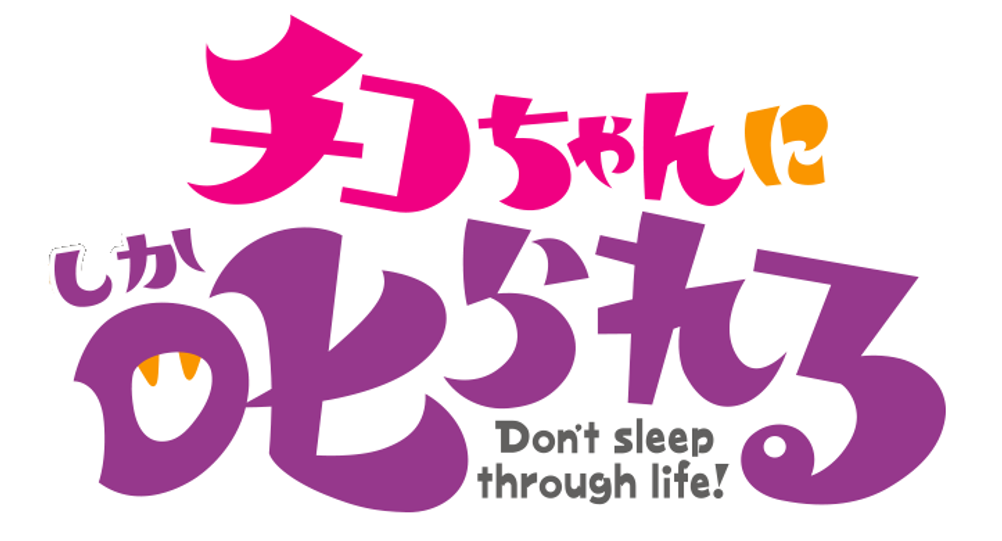
Logo of program

Chico Will Scold You! (チコちゃんに叱られる!, Chico chan ni shikarareru!), also known by the alternate English title You’ll Get Scolded by Chiko-chan!, is a Japanese variety program that has been broadcast on NHK General Television since April 13, 2018. The program won the Entertainment Division Grand Prize in the 22nd Japan Media Arts Festival in 2019.

== Overview ==
Chico

Virtual five-year-old know-it-all Chico (girl) poses various questions to Takashi Okamura (comedian) and the guests. If a guest cannot answer her question, Chico scolds them "Don’t sleep through life!" (ボーっと生きてんじゃねーよ!). This catchphrase was even nominated for the 2018 U-Can New Words and Buzzword Awards.

== Cast ==
- Chico (Yūichi Kimura)
- Takashi Okamura - Emcee
- Ai Tsukahara - Reporter
- Miyuki Morita - Narrator
- Kyoe - Female Crow
- Zunkichi - Male Crow
