= Prophecy (manga) =

Japanese manga series

- First tankōbon volume cover

予告犯 (Yokokuhan)
- Genre: Thriller
- Manga
- Written by: Tetsuya Tsutsui
- Published by: Shueisha
- English publisher: NA: Vertical
- Magazine: Jump X
- Original run: July 25, 2011 – August 10, 2013
- Volumes: 3
- Manga

Yokokuhan: The Copycat
- Written by: Tetsuya Tsutsui
- Illustrated by: Fumio Obata
- Published by: Shueisha
- Magazine: Jump X; (April 10–October 10, 2014); Weekly Young Jump; (March 11–July 23, 2015)
- Original run: April 10, 2014 – July 23, 2015
- Volumes: 3
- Live-action film
- Directed by: Yoshihiro Nakamura
- Written by: Tamio Hayashi
- Music by: Takashi Ōmama
- Studio: Wowow Films; C&I Entertainment
- Released: June 6, 2015
- Television drama

Yokokuhan: The Pain
- Directed by: Yoshihiro Nakamura; Katsutoshi Hirabayashi; Megumi Sawada
- Written by: Tamio Hayashi; Hiroshi Tanaka
- Music by: Takashi Ōmama
- Original network: Wowow
- Original run: June 7, 2015 – July 5, 2015
- Episodes: 5
- icon

Prophecy (Japanese: 予告犯, Hepburn: Yokokuhan; lit. 'Advance Notice Crime') is a Japanese manga series written and illustrated by Tetsuya Tsutsui. It was serialized in Shueisha's seinen manga magazine Jump X from July 2011 to August 2013. A sequel, titled Yokokuhan: The Copycat, was serialized in the same magazine from April to October 2014 and later transferred to Weekly Young Jump, where it ran from March to July 2015. A live-action film and a five-episode television drama adaptations premiered in 2015.

== Media ==
=== Manga ===
Published by Shueisha, it was serialized in Jump X magazine from July 25, 2011, to August 10, 2013, and compiled into three volumes published from April 2012 to September 2013. In North America, it was acquired by Vertical in September 2013.

A spin-off manga, titled Yokokuhan: The Copycat, and illustrated by Fumio Obata, started in Jump X on April 10, 2014. With the magazine discontinuation on October 10, 2014, the series moved to Weekly Young Jump, starting on March 11, 2015. The manga finished on July 23, 2015. Yokokuhan: The Copycat's three volumes were published between April 2015 and August 2015.

A side-off light novel titled Yokokuhan: The Chaser was published on May 19, 2015.

==== Volumes ====
===== Prophecy =====
No.	Original release date	Original ISBN	English release date	English ISBN
1	April 10, 2012	978-4-08-879310-8	November 18, 2014	978-1-939130-59-4
2	December 10, 2012	978-4-08-879495-2	January 27, 2015	978-1-939130-77-8
3	September 10, 2013	978-4-08-879680-2	March 31, 2015	978-1-939130-78-5

===== Yokokuhan: The Copycat =====
No.	Japanese release date	Japanese ISBN
1	April 17, 2015	978-4-08-890036-0
2	May 19, 2015	978-4-08-890169-5
3	August 19, 2015	978-4-08-890294-4

=== Film ===
A live-action film adaptation, directed by Yoshihiro Nakamura, was released on June 6, 2015. Its North American premiere was held during the LA EigaFest in September 2015. The film was released on DVD and Blu-Ray on December 4, 2015, by TC Entertainment.

==== Cast ====
- Toma Ikuta as "Newspaper Man"
- Erika Toda as Yoshino
- Ryohei Suzuki as Kansai
- Gaku Hamada as Nobita
- Yoshiyoshi Arakawa as Metabo

=== Drama ===
Under the title of Yokokuhan: The Pain (予告犯 -THE PAIN-), a Japanese television drama ran for five episodes on Wowow between June 7 to July 5, 2015. Supervised by the film director Yoshihiro Nakamura, it was directed by Nakamura himself, Katsutoshi Hirabayashi and Megumi Sawada, with episodes screenplayed by Tamio Hayashi and Hiroshi Tanaka. It starred Noriyuki Higashiyama and Erika Toda reprises her role from the film. A soundtrack of the series was released on June 3, 2015, by Anchor Records, with all tracks composed by Takashi Omama, the drama's main composer. All episodes were released on DVD and Blu-Ray on December 4, 2015, by TC Entertainment.

== Reception ==
Volume 3 reached the 45th place on the weekly Oricon manga charts and, as of September 15, 2013, has sold 20,871 copies.

On Anime News Network, Rebecca Silverman gave volume 1 an overall grade of A−. On Manga News, the series has a staff grade of 16 out of 20.

The film earned ¥199 million (US$1.6 million) on its opening weekend in Japan and a total of ¥553 million (US$4.48 million) so far.
