= Shinichi Ishizuka =

Japanese manga artist (born 1971)

Shinichi Ishizuka 石塚真一
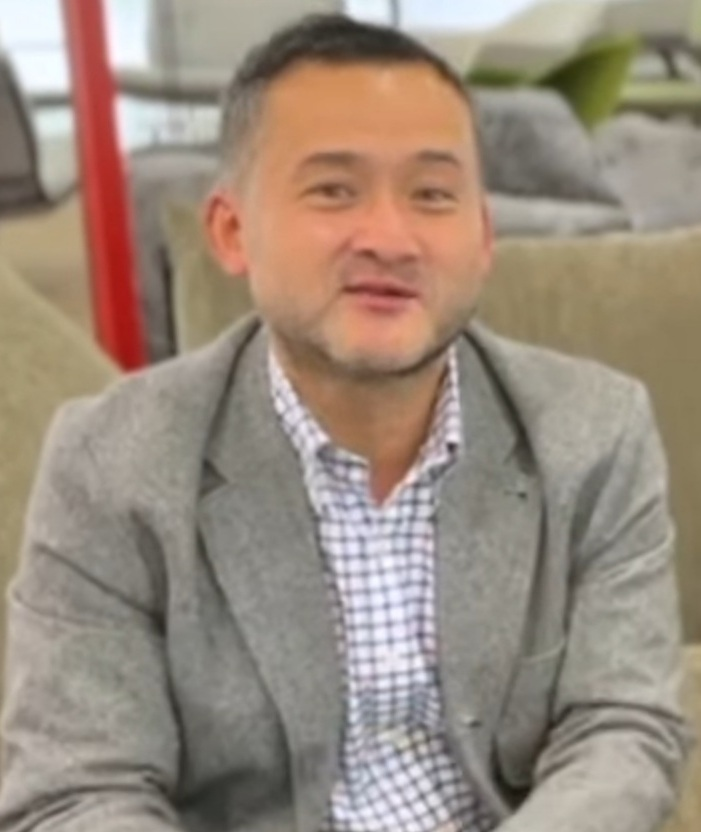
- Ishizuka in 2023
- Born: 1971 (age 54–55) Ibaraki Prefecture, Japan
- Area: Manga artist
- Notable works: Gaku: Minna no Yama; Blue Giant
- Awards: 1st Manga Taishō; 54th and 62nd Shogakukan Manga Award in the general category; 2017 Japan Media Arts Festival grand prize

Shinichi Ishizuka (Japanese: 石塚真一, Hepburn: Ishizuka Shin'ichi; born 1971) is a Japanese manga artist. He made his debut in 2001 and began his first series, Gaku: Minna no Yama, a manga about mountain climbing, in Big Comic Original in 2003, where it was serialized until 2012. He also created Blue Giant, a manga about jazz, and its sequels, which have been serialized in Big Comic since 2013.

Ishizuka studied at universities in the United States, where he was introduced to mountain climbing and given an increased exposure to jazz. After returning to Japan and being laid off, he began working towards becoming a manga artist and published the one-shot The First Step in 2001. His works Gaku: Minna no Yama and Blue Giant have both received film adaptations and awards, including the Manga Taishō, Shogakukan Manga Award, and a grand prize at the Japan Media Arts Festival.

== Biography ==
Ishizuka was born in Ibaraki Prefecture in 1971. After graduating from high school, he attended Southern Illinois University's Niigata campus, before moving to its main campus. He later transferred to San Jose State University to study meteorology. During his time in the United States, a friend of his told him that he chose to study archeology abroad after reading Master Keaton by Naoki Urasawa. Ishizuka was surprised by this answer and desired to create manga with a similar impact. One of Ishizuka's roommates during this time was fond of mountain climbing and introduced it to him. He also gained an increased exposure to jazz music. He described jazz and mountain climbing as "the two souvenirs I brought back [from the United States]".

Upon returning to Japan, Ishizuka worked at an import company run by an acquaintance from the United States. However, the company went bankrupt within six months of him joining. After being laid off, he decided to become a manga artist and began to draw manga in his spare time while working part-time teaching English. In 2001, he submitted the one-shot The First Step to the Shogakukan Newcomer Manga Award; it won the award in the general category. After winning the award, he began to pursue drawing manga full-time and quit his job, despite his boss at the time telling him it would be "absolutely impossible" to become a manga artist. He initially worked as an assistant for six months.

On September 20, 2003, Ishizuka began serializing Gaku: Minna no Yama, a manga about mountain climbing, in Shogakukan's Big Comic Original magazine. It completed its serialization on June 5, 2012. It won the first Manga Taishō in 2008 and the 54th Shogakukan Manga Award for general manga in 2009. It received a live-action film adaptation in 2011. It also won an excellence prize at the Japan Media Arts Festival in 2012.

Ishizuka began serializing Blue Giant, a manga about jazz, in Shogakukan's Big Comic magazine on May 10, 2013. It completed its serialization on August 25, 2016. It won the 62nd Shogakukan Manga Award in the general category in 2007; it also won the grand prize at the Japan Media Arts Festival in the same year. It received an anime film adaptation in 2023. A second series, titled Blue Giant Supreme, was serialized in Big Comic from September 10, 2016, to April 25, 2020. The third series, titled Blue Giant Explorer, was serialized in Big Comic from May 25, 2020, to May 10, 2023. A fourth series, titled Blue Giant Momentum, began serialization in Big Comic on July 25, 2023.

== Influences ==
Ishizuka has stated he learned to draw from the works of Urasawa and Kenshi Hirokane, before incorporating his own style. Ishizuka has particularly cited Hirokane for inspiration, describing his works as being very easy to read. He cited Shuichi Shigeno's manga Bari Bari Densetsu and Tetsuya Chiba's manga Notari Matsutarō for inspiration drawing movement and crowds, respectively. Ishizuka also stated he was influenced by Tsuribaka Nisshi by Jūzō Yamasaki and Kenichi Kitami.

== Works ==
=== Series ===
Title	Year	Magazine	Notes	Ref.
Gaku: Minna no Yama	2003–2012	Big Comic Original		
Sonde Yoshi! (そんでよし!)	2009	Big Comic Original Special Edition	Based on a one-shot	
Blue Giant	2013–2016	Big Comic		
Hokurō: Last Hunter (北狼 ラストハンター, Hokurō Rasuto Hantā)	2013–present	Big Comic Spirits	Irregular serialization	
Blue Giant Supreme	2016–2020	Big Comic		
Blue Giant Explorer	2020–2023	Big Comic		
Blue Giant Momentum	2023–present	Big Comic		

=== Short works ===
Title	Year	Magazine	Notes	Ref.
The First Step	2002	Big Comic Original Special Edition	One-shot	
Tokyo Check In	2005	Big Comic Original	Short series	
50 Years Later	2024	Big Comic Original	One-shot; written by Number 8	

=== Other ===
- Seiko Jazz (2017) – album cover illustration for Seiko Matsuda
