= Assocreation =

Assocreation is a group of fine artists founded in Vienna, Austria in 1997. Its works are primarily based on haptic perception and conscious temporal motion in space. In seeking to inspire reflection and insight through motion and sensory experiences, Assocreation works primarily with interactive installations and public happenings. Ground and floor play an important role in its works.

== Works ==
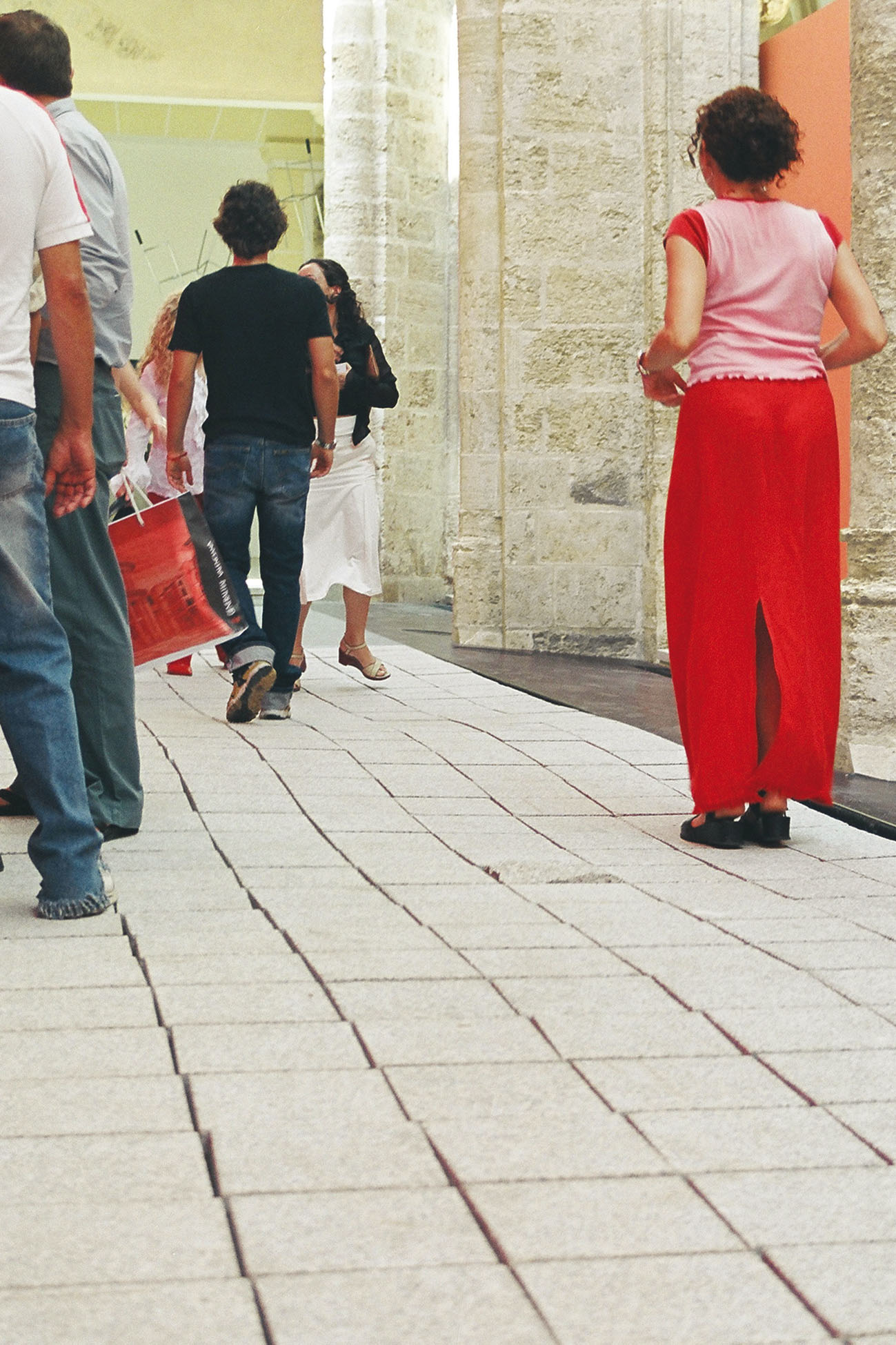
Common Ground – Departamento de Danza. Interactive Installation, 2003. Exhibit "La Ciudad Ideal", 2a Bienal de Valencia. Convento del Carmen, Valencia (ES). Foto: Assocreation

Assocreation's agents are anonymous yet they consider their work to be the product of an individual. Their creations include a wide range of physical works which have been premiered at art festivals such as the Ars Electronica in Linz, Austria; the Bienal de Valencia, Spain; and the Machine-RAUM Biennale in Vejle, Denmark.

The group made its first international appearance in 1999 at the Ars Electronica Festival under the motto "Life Science", where it featured its interactive, telematic installation Bump. In this work two sidewalks were connected via the internet and set up in public areas in Linz, Austria, and Budapest, Hungary. In walking over one sidewalk participants trigger electronic impulses which are then transferred to the other, raising that sidewalk's planks and pedestrians several centimeters and vice versa. This installation was presented in Istanbul, the European Capital of Culture 2010, on both European and Asian sides of the city.

The project Common Ground followed in 2003 at the Bienal de Valencia, featured in the “Department Store” exhibit under the care of Will Alsop. This installation is made up of a stone-tiled floor mounted on springs and set up in an urban context. Every step unleashes a wave of movement which spreads through the floor and takes hold of other participants. Like Bump, Common Ground also turns solid ground into a loose membrane.

In 2005 Public Hangings offered participants the opportunity to be suspended by the collars of business suits in a place normally reserved for the processing of dead meat.

Various smaller projects were realized thorough 2006, including Pink Prints and Freedom. The latter consists of yellow drainage pipes shaped into writing and mounted as 3D graffiti on the chain-link fences of several basketball courts in Vienna, Austria. It was around this time that Assocreation was first invited to display its work in art galleries. The installation Red Carpet, an actual carpet made of loosely joined broom heads, was created by the group for the exhibit “Knock Knock Picnic” in the New York gallery Jack The Pelican Presents. This work was also presented at the European art festival Europalia 07 in the group exhibit “Agorafolly”.

Assocreation started its Moon Ride project in 2006 which is also the object of its current activities. Originally featured at the Ars Electronica Festival (motto “Simplicity”), it was also on display at the Machine-RAUM Biennale for Video Art and Digital Culture in Vejle, Denmark, in 2007. Participants are invited to hook their own bikes up to bike trainers previously transformed into generators. Every step on the pedals generates electricity, illuminating – at varying intensity – a large light balloon hovering in the night sky. Moon Ride is inspired by the fictitious presumption that without human effort the night is void of light, even moonlight. This installation is due to be presented at the festival Warsaw under Construction, under the care of the Warsaw Museum of Modern Art.

== Exhibits ==
- 1997: Windows 97. Installation. Tram Station Schottentor, Vienna
- 1999: Bump - Linz/Budapest. Telematic Installation. Group exhibit "Life Science", Ars Electronica Festival. Hauptstraße Linz and Liszt Ferenc tér, Budapest
- 2003: Common Ground – Departamento de Danza. Interactive Installation. Group exhibit „La Ciudad Ideal“, 2a Bienal de Valencia. Convento del Carmen, Valencia; Pink Prints – shoe diploma. Performance and Object. Künstlerhaus and the Austrian National Library (ÖNB), Vienna
- 2004: A Public Hanging. Installation and Happening. Atelier Assocreation, Vienna; Airlines. Installation. Group exhibit "Niemandsland", Künstlerhaus Wien
- 2005: A Public Hanging. Happening. Atlas Meats, Meatpacking District, Manhattan, New York; Real Estate – Vienna. Performance. Laxenburger Straße, Simmeringer Hauptstraße and Eckartsaugasse, Vienna
- 2006: Moon Ride. Interactive Installation. Group exhibit "Simplicity", Ars Electronica Festival. Hauptplatz, Linz (also 2007: Machine-RAUM Biennale For Video Art And Digital Culture. Kirkegade und Foren Møllen, Vejle); Red Carpet. Installation. Group exhibit "Knock Knock Picnic", Gallery Jack The Pelican Presents. Driggs Av., Williamsburg, Brooklyn, New York City, NY (US) (also 2007: "Agorafolly artist trail", Europalia 07. Place des Palais/Paleizenplein, Brussels
- 2007: Bump – Gijón / Oviedo. Telematic Installation. Group exhibit "playware". LABoral Centro de Arte y Creación Industrial, Gijón/ Stadtzentrum, Oviedo; Freedom. Installation. Basketball court, Richard-Waldemar-Park, Vienna
- 2009: Fieldwork. Installation. Exhibit "taste it!". Künstlerhaus, Vienna
- 2010: Moon Ride. Interactive Installation. Group exhibit "Warsaw Under Construction", Muzeum Sztuki Nowoczesnej / Museum of Modern Art. Warsaw; Bump – Asia/Europe. Telematic Installation. Istanbul 2010 – European Capital of Culture. Üsküdar IDO, Istanbu/ Eminönü IDO, Istanbul; Pink Prints. Object. Group exhibit „Cim Nekül“. Collection Wenzl. Institut Français, Budapest
