= Gaku: Minna no Yama =

Japanese manga series

- First tankōbon volume cover

岳 みんなの山
- Manga
- Written by: Shinichi Ishizuka
- Published by: Shogakukan
- Magazine: Big Comic Original
- Original run: 20 September 2003 – 5 June 2012
- Volumes: 18
- Live-action
- Gaku: Minna no Yama (2011 film)
- icon

Gaku: Minna no Yama (岳 みんなの山; lit. 'Peak: Everyone's Mountain') is a Japanese mountaineering manga series written and illustrated by Shinichi Ishizuka. It was serialized by Shogakukan in the seinen manga magazine Big Comic Original from September 2003 to June 2012, with its chapters collected in eighteen tankōbon volumes. It depicts the adventures of a volunteer with an alpine search and rescue team in the Japanese Alps. A live-action film adaptation premiered in 2011.

Gaku: Minna no Yama received the 2008 Manga Taishō and the 2009 Shogakukan Manga Award for general manga.

== Plot ==
Sanpo Shimazaki, an experienced mountaineer and volunteer rescuer, works in Japan's Northern Alps after climbing major peaks around the world and gaining rescue experience overseas. Based around the mountains near Matsumoto, Nagano Prefecture, the story depicts Sanpo responding to accidents involving hikers, climbers, and other mountain visitors.

Kumi Shiina, a rookie member of the Nagano Prefectural Police mountain rescue squad, joins the team under the guidance of squad chief Masato Noda and Sanpo. As she trains and participates in rescue operations, Kumi confronts the harsh realities of the work, including failed rescues, grieving families, and the limits of what rescuers can do against nature.

== Publication ==
Written and illustrated by Shinichi Ishizuka, Gaku: Minna no Yama was serialized in Shogakukan's seinen manga magazine Big Comic Original from 20 September 2003 to 5 June 2012. Shogakukan collected its chapters eighteen tankōbon volumes, released from 26 April 2005 to 30 August 2012.

=== Volumes ===
No.	Japanese release date	Japanese ISBN
1	26 April 2005	4-09-187571-8
2	29 September 2006	4-09-180730-5
3	26 December 2006	4-09-181003-9
4	24 April 2007	978-4-09-181207-0
5	28 September 2007	978-4-09-181470-8
6	30 January 2008	978-4-09-181719-8
7	30 June 2008	978-4-09-182029-7
8	28 November 2008	978-4-09-182248-2
9	27 February 2009	978-4-09-182380-9
10	28 August 2009	978-4-09-182590-2
11	27 February 2010	978-4-09-183073-9
12	30 June 2010	978-4-09-183218-4
13	30 November 2010	978-4-09-183527-7
14	28 April 2011	978-4-09-183819-3
15	30 September 2011	978-4-09-184085-1
16	29 February 2012	978-4-09-184277-0
17	30 July 2012	978-4-09-184645-7
18	30 August 2012	978-4-09-184707-2

== Reception ==
The series' sixth volume reached number 6 on the Tohan Comic Ranking; volume seven also reached number 6; volume eight reached number 14; and remained at number 16 the following week, and volume 9 debuted at number 26, before rising to number 17 the following week. The series was featured by Da Vinci magazine as the Platinum Book of the Month for April 2007.

Gaku: Minna no Yama received the first annual Manga Taishō in 2008, and the 54th Shogakukan Manga Award for the general category in 2009.
