= Daito Manabe =

Japanese media artist

- 真鍋 大度
- Born: 1976 (age 49–50); Tokyo, Japan
- Education: University of Tokyo
- Occupations: Media artist Programmer; Engineer
- Years active: 2006-present
- Website: https://www.daito.ws/

Daito Manabe (Japanese: 真鍋 大度, Hepburn: Manabe Daito) (born 1976) is a Japanese media artist, programmer, engineer, and DJ who creates artwork and interactive installations that utilize contemporary technologies such as virtual reality as well as prominent use of light and sound. He founded Rhizomatiks in 2006 after graduating from the University of Tokyo. His work with Rhizomatiks includes collaborations with Perfume, Björk, Nike, Honda and an augmented reality computer graphics display at the closing ceremony of the 2016 Summer Olympics in Rio de Janeiro, Brazil.

In 2016 Manabe collaborated with American artist Nosaj Thing to create a touring show featuring real-time augmented reality visuals using multiple Kinect cameras on stage. The debut performance at Coachella Festival was described by Pitchfork Magazine as "runaway winner for best visual production" and was billed by Sónar Festival as "extremely captivating, technologically advanced, show of inordinate beauty".

Manabe won the 2016 Mainichi Design Award

In 2023 Manabe collaborated with two-time Olympic champion Yuzuru Hanyu in the creation of his solo ice show production Gift, the first figure skating event to be held at Tokyo Dome.
