= Manhole (manga) =

Japanese manga series

- Cover of the first volume

マンホール (Manhōru)
- Genre: Suspense
- Manga
- Written by: Tetsuya Tsutsui
- Published by: Square Enix
- English publisher: NA: Abrams ComicArts
- Imprint: Young Gangan Comics
- Magazine: Young Gangan
- Original run: 2004 – 2006
- Volumes: 3

Manhole (Japanese: マンホール, Hepburn: Manhōru) is a Japanese manga series written and illustrated by Tetsuya Tsutsui. It was serialized in Young Gangan from 2004 to 2006, with its individual chapters being collected into three volumes. The series follows two prefectural police officers as they investigate the mysterious source of a contagious disease.

Tsutsui conceived of the plot after reading a novel on bacterial diseases, which led him to research the subject. Critical reception has been positive, with critics praising the story and artwork, albeit offering mixed reception on the characters.

In 2009, the first volume was designated as a "harmful book" by Nagasaki Prefecture and effectively banned from sale there. Tsutsui only learned of the designation five years after the fact, and attempted to overturn it but was ultimately unable to do so; this experience led him to create Yūgai Toshi, which centers around censorship of manga.

== Plot ==
A bloodied, naked man is found dead in the city of Sasahara, prompting prefectural police commissioner Ken Mizoguchi and his assistant Nao Inoue to investigate. They discover the man died from an unknown form of filariasis, which begins to rapidly spread across Japan. While the outbreak appears to be random, it is actually the result of a man's plan, formed from the darkness of the city's manholes.

== Production ==
Tsutsui conceived the series while reading The Whisper of the Angel, a Japanese novel about bacterial diseases. Tsutsui later read scientific works on the subject and visited a museum in Tokyo on bacterial diseases. Tsutsui also cited American cinema and the works of Osamu Tezuka as sources of inspiration. Tsutsui decided to make Shunsuke Kitajima, a character from his work Reset, appear in Manhole after meeting a dedicated fan of the character at a convention in France.

== Publication ==
Written and illustrated by Tetsuya Tsutsui, the series was serialized in Square Enix's Young Gangan magazine from 2004 to 2006. Square Enix collected the series' individual chapters into three tankōbon volumes.

Abrams ComicArts is publishing the manga in English under their Kana imprint.

=== Volumes ===
No.	Original release date	Original ISBN	English release date	English ISBN
1	August 25, 2005	4-7575-1507-3	October 29, 2024	978-1-41-977770-7
2	January 25, 2006	4-7575-1609-6	January 7, 2025	978-1-41-977833-9
3	June 24, 2006	4-7575-1707-6	April 1, 2025	978-1-41-977834-6

== Reception ==
Critical reception to the story has been positive, with critics praising the use of suspense and realism. Critics differed on the story's originality, with Manga Sanctuary praising its originality and BD Gest describing it as "not fundamentally original". Manga News praised the longer length compared to Tsutsui's previous works Duds Hunt and Reset, believing it to have resulted in better pacing.

The characters received mixed reception. Some critics praised the main characters, noting their buddy cop-like nature. However, Splash Comics felt their dynamic was too cliché. Manga Sanctuary praised the villain as understandable and relatable.

The artwork received a positive response, with critics positively noting its character designs, backgrounds, and depictions of gore. Splash Comics felt the art style was similar to Western comics and the works of Jiro Taniguchi.

=== Nagasaki Prefecture ban ===
In 2009, the first volume of Manhole was designated a "harmful book" under Nagasaki Prefecture's Youth Protection and Development Ordinance, effectively causing the volume to be banned from sale in the prefecture. Nagasaki Prefecture did not inform Tsutsui of the ban as they felt it was unnecessary to do so because it was posted on their website. Tsutsui learned of the ban about five years later in late 2013, when he read a comment in the review section of a retailer's website.

Upon learning of the ban, Tsutsui hired a lawyer and requested Nagasaki Prefecture reverse its "harmful" designation, but they refused. He later traveled to Nagasaki Prefecture to oversee the review, but the members of the committee felt there was no problem with the "harmful" designation. This experience would become the basis for Tsutsui's later work Yūgai Toshi.
