= Mutsuki Iwanaka =

Japanese voice actor

- 岩中 睦樹
- Born: 7 January 1994 (age 32)
- Occupation: Voice actor
- Years active: 2015–present
- Employer: Mausu Promotion
- Notable work: Classroom of the Elite as Haruki Yamauchi; Captain Tsubasa as Mamoru Izawa; The Gene of AI as Jay; Negative Positive Angler as Tsunehiro Sasaki; TsumaSho as Renji Aikawa

Mutsuki Iwanaka (岩中 睦樹, Iwanaka Mutsuki; born 7 January 1994) is a Japanese voice actor from Kitakyushu, affiliated with Mausu Promotion. He is known for starring as Haruki Yamauchi in Classroom of the Elite, Mamoru Izawa in Captain Tsubasa, Jay in The Gene of AI, Tsunehiro Sasaki in Negative Positive Angler, and Renji Aikawa in TsumaSho.

== Biography ==
Iwanaka, a native of Kitakyushu, was born on 7 January 1994. Interested in playing with his voice, he learned about professional voice acting and decided to enroll in a vocational school. After joining their training school in 2014, he joined Mausu Promotion on 1 April 2016.

After voicing characters in Aikatsu! and its sequel Aikatsu Stars!, D.Gray-man Hallow, JoJo's Bizarre Adventure: Diamond Is Unbreakable, and Uta no Prince-sama, he voiced Souji Kibino in both the Dream Festival! anime and Data Carddass game. In 2017, he voiced Haruki Yamauchi in Classroom of the Elite and Daisuke Tachibana in Tsuki ga Kirei. He later starred as Mamoru Izawa in Captain Tsubasa. reprising the role in the 2018 game Captain Tsubasa ZERO: Miracle Shot.

In 2023, he voiced Jay in The Gene of AI. In 2024, it was announced that he would voice Tsunehiro Sasaki in Negative Positive Angler and Renji Aikawa in TsumaSho.

He speaks the Kitakyushu and Hakata dialects. His hobbies and special skills include hair styling, nose flutes, sound effects, and vocal imitation.

== Filmography ==
=== Television animation ===
Year	Work	Role	Ref.
2015	Aikatsu!		
2015	Bikini Warriors		
2016	Aikatsu Stars!		
2016	D.Gray-man Hallow		
2016	JoJo's Bizarre Adventure: Diamond Is Unbreakable	Akira	
2016	Tales of Zestiria the X		
2016	Trickster	Kei Motomura	
2016	Uta no Prince-sama		
2017	Akashic Records of Bastard Magic Instructor	Rukio Charles	
2017	Akiba's Trip: The Animation	Jackal	
2017	Atom: The Beginning	Yamada and friends 1	
2017	Classroom of the Elite	Haruki Yamauchi	
2017	Dream Festival!	Souji Kibino	
2017	Kabukibu!		
2017	March Comes In like a Lion		
2017	Puzzle & Dragons X		
2017	Seven Mortal Sins		
2017	The Royal Tutor		
2017	Tsuki ga Kirei	Daisuke Tachibana	
2017	Vatican Miracle Examiner	Mario Lotte	
2017	Welcome to the Ballroom		
2018	Captain Tsubasa	Mamoru Izawa	
2018	Goblin Slayer	Field Scout	
2018	Hakata Tonkotsu Ramens	Yamamoto	
2019	African Office Worker	Kirin-sensei	
2019	Inazuma Eleven: Orion no Kokuin	Artur	
2021	Selection Project	Tarō Tōma	
2023	Dead Mount Death Play	Hiiro Horoshima	
2023	The Gene of AI	Jay	
2024	Negative Positive Angler	Tsunehiro Sasaki	
2024	TsumaSho	Renji Aikawa	
2025	Chikuwa Senki	Banjirō Inumiya	

=== Animated film ===
Year	Work	Role	Ref.
2017	Haikyu!! Genius and Sense	Motomu Sawauchi	

=== Original net animation ===
Year	Work	Role	Ref.
2022	Romantic Killer	Katzun	

=== Video games ===
Year	Work	Role	Ref.
2016	Data Carddass DoriFesu	Souji Kibino	
2016	White Cat Tennis	Jesta	
2018	Captain Tsubasa ZERO: Miracle Shot	Mamoru Izawa	
2020	War of the Visions: Final Fantasy Brave Exvius	Camillo	
2022	Hatsune Miku: Colorful Stage!	Souma Miyata	
2022	eBaseball Powerful Pro Yakyuu 2022	Akira Hiwa	
2024	Bar Stella Abyss	Ginga	

=== Dubbing ===
- Black Phone 2 (Ernesto (Miguel Mora))
- No Way Up (Danilo (Manuel Pacific))
- Operation Napoleon (Elías (Atli Óskar Fjalarsson))
- Wednesday (Tyler Galpin / Hyde (Hunter Doohan))
