= Association des Critiques et des journalistes de Bande Dessinée =

French association of critics and journalists

The Association des Critiques et des journalistes de Bande Dessinée (ACBD) (English: Association of Critics and Journalists of Comics) is a French association of comic critics and journalists, founded in 1984. It awards five prizes for works published in French, including the Critics' Grand Prize (French: Grand Prix de la critique) for French-language bandes dessinées (previously called the Bloody Mary Prize), the Comics Prize (French: Prix Comics) for comics translated from English to French, and the Asia Prize (French: Prix Asie) for Asian comics translated into French. Between 2000 and 2016, the association published annual reports on the bande dessinée industry.
