= Sakuhei Fujiwhara =

Japanese meteorologist (1884–1950)

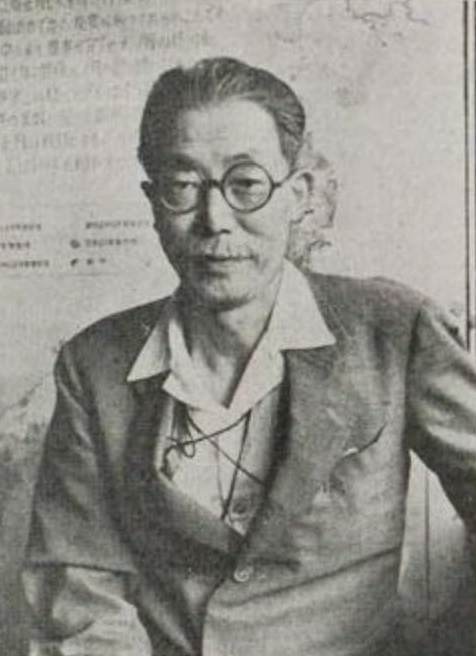
- Taken in September 1949
- Born: October 29, 1884; Suwa, Nagano, Japan
- Died: September 22, 1950 (aged 65)
- Education: Tokyo Imperial University
- Known for: Fujiwhara effect
- Awards: Japan Academy Prize (1920)
- Scientific career
- Fields: Meteorology

Japanese name
- Kanji: 藤原 咲平
Transcriptions
- Romanization: Fujiwara Sakuhei

Sakuhei Fujiwhara (Note: He preferred to spell his surname in Romaji as Fujiwhara, which is unusual by modern standards: the Hepburn romanizations Fujihara and Fujiwara are more common after World War II. Japanese texts give the furigana for his name as either Fujihara (ふじはら), Fujiwara (ふじわら), or both.) (藤原 咲平, Fujiwara Sakuhei; October 29, 1884 – September 22, 1950) was a Japanese meteorologist who became the namesake for the Fujiwhara effect. Novelist Jirō Nitta is his nephew and mathematician Masahiko Fujiwara is his grandnephew.

== Biography ==
=== Early life ===
Born in the city of Suwa, Nagano Prefecture, Fujiwhara received primary education at Takashima Common Elementary School and Suwa Higher Elementary School, where he was in the same class as future Imperial Japanese Army general, Tetsuzan Nagata. He was also close friends with Shigeo Iwanami, who would later found Iwanami Shoten Publishing company. He joined the Central Meteorological Observatory (now the Japan Meteorological Agency) in 1909 after completing undergraduate studies in theoretical physics at Tokyo Imperial University (now the University of Tokyo).

=== Academic career ===
Fujiwhara earned his doctorate in 1915 through his research work on the abnormal propagation of sound waves, and earned the Japan Academy Prize in 1920 in recognition of his research. He traveled to Norway in the same year to study meteorology under Vilhelm Bjerknes.

He joined the Central Institution for the Training of Meteorologists (current Meteorological College of Japan) as general director after returning to Japan in 1922. He started his tenure as a professor at Tokyo Imperial University in 1924, and succeeded Takematsu Okada as the fifth director of the Japan Meteorological Agency in 1941.

=== Later life ===
Fujiwhara participated in the development of the fire balloon during the Pacific War, and was purged from his position after the conclusion of the war. He retreated to the countryside afterwards to concentrate on his writing, and devoted his efforts to educating the future generation of meteorologists and researching meteorological phenomena such as vortices, clouds and atmospheric optics. He also spearheaded the study of gliders in Japan, and became a member of the Japan Academy in 1937.

== Texts ==
- Kumo wo Tsukamu Hanashi (雲を掴む話; lit. "Grasping Clouds"), Iwanami Shoten Publishing, 1926
- Kumo (雲; lit. "Clouds"), Iwanami Shoten Publishing, 1929
- Kishō to Jinsei (気象と人生; lit. "Meteorology and life"), 1932
- Chika, Chiretsu to Jishin (地渦・地裂及び地震; lit. "Subduction, faults and earthquakes"), 1932
- Taikichū no Kōshō (大気中の光象; lit. "Atmospheric optics"), 1933
- Kishō to Jinsei (氣象と人生; lit. "Meteorology and life"), Iwanami Shoten Publishing, 1935
- Tenbun ya Kishō no Hanashi (天文や氣象の話; lit. "On Weather and Meteorology"), Iwanami Shoten Publishing, 1935
- Uzumaki no Jikken (渦巻の実験; lit. "Experiments on vortices"), 1939
- Kishō Kanshoku (気象感触; lit. "Sentiments on meteorology"), Iwanami Shoten Publishing, 1942
- Umi no Nayami (生みの悩み; lit. "The anguish of childbirth"), 1947
- Reki to Seikatsu (暦と生活; lit. "Life and the calendar"), Sanseido, 1948
- Kishō Nōto (気象ノート; lit. "Notes on meteorology"), 1948
- Terada Torahiko Shū (寺田寅彦集; lit. "Collected works of Torahiko Terada"), Iwanami Shoten Publishing, 1949
- Gunka – Kishō Yonjūnen (群渦 – 気象四十年; lit. "Multiple vortices – 40 years of meteorology"), 1950
- Nippon Kishōgaku Shi (日本気象学史; lit. "History of meteorology in Japan"), Iwanami Shoten Publishing, 1951
- Reki to Seikatsu (暦と生活; lit. "Life and the calendar"), Sanseido, 1955
- Chika Nitsuite (地渦について; lit. "About subduction"), Iwanami Shoten Publishing
- Taiki Butsurigaku (大気物理学; lit. "Atmospheric physics"), Iwanami Shoten Publishing
- Kishō Kōgaku (気象光学; lit. "Atmospheric optics"), Iwanami Shoten Publishing
