= Eisner Award for Best Adaptation from Another Medium =

American comic book award

- Awarded for: Best Adaptation from Another Medium
- Country: United States
- First award: 2010
- Most recent winner: Lord of the Flies: The Graphic Novel, adapted by Aimée De Jongh
- Website: www.comic-con.org/awards/eisner-awards-current-info

The Eisner Award for Best Adaptation from Another Medium is an award for "creative achievement" in American comic books.

== History and name change ==
The award was launched in 2010 as Best Adaptation from Another Work. No award was given in 2012. In 2013 the award was renamed to Best Adaptation from Another Medium. No award was given in 2015 or 2017.

== Winners and nominees ==
Award winners and nominees
Year	Title	Original Creator	Adapted by	Publisher	Result	Ref.
2010	Richard Stark's Parker: The Hunter	Donald E. Westlake	Darwyn Cooke	IDW Publishing	Winner	
2010	The Book of Genesis		Robert Crumb	W. W. Norton & Company	Nominee	
2010	Charles Darwin's On the Origin of Species: A Graphic Adaptation	Charles Darwin	Michael Keller and Nicolle Rager Fuller	Rodale Books	Nominee	
2010	Fahrenheit 451: The Authorized Adaptation	Ray Bradbury	Tim Hamilton	Hill & Wang	Nominee	
2010	West Coast Blues	Jean-Patrick Manchette	Jacques Tardi	Fantagraphics	Nominee	
2011	The Marvelous Land of Oz	L. Frank Baum	Eric Shanower and Skottie Young	Marvel Comics	Winner	
2011	The Little Prince	Antoine de Saint-Exupéry	Joann Sfar	Houghton Mifflin Harcourt	Nominee	
2011	7 Billion Needles, vols. 1 and 2 (Inspired by Needle)	Hal Clement	Nobuaki Tadano	Vertical	Nominee	
2011	Dante's Divine Comedy	Dante Alighieri	Seymour Chwast	Bloomsbury Publishing	Nominee	
2011	SilverFin: A James Bond Adventure	Charlie Higson	Charlie Higson and Kev Walker	Disney-Hyperion	Nominee	
2012	No Eisner Award for Best Adaptation was presented in 2012.					
2013	Richard Stark's Parker: The Score	Donald E. Westlake	Darwyn Cooke	IDW Publishing	Winner	
2013	A Wrinkle in Time	Madeleine L'Engle	Hope Larson	Farrar, Straus and Giroux	Nominee	
2013	Chico and Rita		Fernando Trueba and Javier Mariscal	SelfMadeHero	Nominee	
2013	Homer's Odyssey	Homer	Seymour Chwast	Bloomsbury Publishing	Nominee	
2013	Road to Oz	L. Frank Baum	Eric Shanower and Skottie Young	Marvel Comics	Nominee	
2014	Richard Stark's Parker: Slayground	Donald E. Westlake	Darwyn Cooke	IDW Publishing	Winner	
2014	The Castle	Franz Kafka	David Zane Mairowitz and Jaromír 99	SelfMadeHero	Nominee	
2014	The Complete Don Quixote	Miguel de Cervantes	Rob Davis	SelfMadeHero	Nominee	
2014	The Strange Tale of Panorama Island	Edogawa Ranpo	Suehiro Maruo	Last Gasp	Nominee	
2014	Django Unchained	Quentin Tarantino	Reginald Hudlin, R. M. Guéra, et al.	DC Comics/Vertigo Comics	Nominee	
2015	No Eisner Award for Best Adaptation was presented in 2015.					
2016	Two Brothers	Milton Hatoum	Fábio Moon and Gabriel Bá	Dark Horse Comics	Winner	
2016	Captive of Friendly Cove: Based on the Secret Journals of John Jewitt	John R. Jewitt	Rebecca Goldfield, Mike Short, and Matt Dembicki	Fulcrum Publishing	Nominee	
2016	City of Clowns	Daniel Alarcón	Daniel Alarcón and Sheila Alvarado	Riverhead Books	Nominee	
2016	Ghetto Klown	John Leguizamo	John Leguizamo, Christa Cassano, and Shamus Beyale	Abrams ComicArts	Nominee	
2016	Lafcadio Hearn's “The Faceless Ghost” and Other Macabre Tales from Japan	Lafcadio Hearn	Sean Michael Wilson and Michiru Morikawa	Shambhala Publications	Nominee	
2017	No Eisner Award for Best Adaptation was presented in 2017.					
2018	Kindred	Octavia E. Butler	Damian Duffy and John Jennings	Abrams ComicArts	Winner	
2018	Beowulf		Santiago García and David Rubín	Image Comics	Nominee	
2018	H. P. Lovecraft's The Hound and Other Stories	H. P. Lovecraft	Gou Tanabe, trans. by Zack Davisson	Dark Horse Comics	Nominee	
2018	Herman Melville's Moby Dick	Herman Melville	Christophe Chabouté, trans. by Laure Dupont	Dark Horse Comics	Nominee	
2019	”Frankenstein” in Frankenstein: Junji Ito Story Collection	Mary Shelley	Junji Ito, trans. by Jocelyne Allen	Viz Media	Winner	
2019	Anne Frank's Diary: The Graphic Adaptation	Anne Frank	Ari Folman and David Polonsky	Pantheon Books	Nominee	
2019	Out in the Open	Jesús Carrasco	Javi Rey, trans. by Lawrence Schimel	SelfMadeHero	Nominee	
2019	Speak: The Graphic Novel	Laurie Halse Anderson	Emily Carroll	Farrar, Straus and Giroux	Nominee	
2019	To Build a Fire: Based on Jack London's Classic Story	Jack London	Christophe Chabouté	Gallery 13	Nominee	
2020	Snow, Glass, Apples	Neil Gaiman	Colleen Doran	Dark Horse Comics	Winner	
2020	The Giver	Lois Lowry	P. Craig Russell	HMH Books for Young Readers	Nominee	
2020	The Handmaid's Tale: The Graphic Novel	Margaret Atwood	Renee Nault	Nan A. Talese	Nominee	
2020	The Seventh Voyage	Stanisław Lem	Jon J Muth, trans. by Michael Kandel	Scholastic Graphix	Nominee	
2020	Giraffes on Horseback Salad: Salvador Dali, the Marx Brothers, and the Strangest Movie Never Made	Salvador Dalí	Josh Frank, Tim Heidecker, and Manuela Pertega	Quirk Books	Nominee	
2020	H.P. Lovecraft's At the Mountains of Madness, vols. 1–2	H. P. Lovecraft	Gou Tanabe, trans. by Zack Davisson	Dark Horse Manga	Nominee	
2021	Superman Smashes the Klan		Gene Luen Yang and Gurihiru	DC Comics	Winner	
2021	Constitution Illustrated		R. Sikoryak	Drawn & Quarterly	Nominee	
2021	Parable of the Sower: The Graphic Novel Adaptation	Octavia E. Butler	Damian Duffy and John Jennings	Abrams Books	Nominee	
2021	Sapiens: A Graphic History: The Birth of Humankind, vol. 1		Yuval Noah Harari, David Vandermeulen, and Daniel Casanave	Harper Perennial	Nominee	
2021	Slaughterhouse-Five	Kurt Vonnegut	Ryan North and Albert Monteys	Archaia Entertainment/Boom! Studios	Nominee	
2022	George Orwell’s 1984: The Graphic Novel	George Orwell	Fido Nesti	Mariner Books	Winner	
2022	After the Rain	Nnedi Okorafor	John Jennings and David Brame	Megascope/Abrams ComicArts	Nominee	
2022	Bubble	Maximum Fun	Jordan Morris, Sarah Morgan, and Tony Cliff	First Second/Macmillan	Nominee	
2022	Disney Cruella: Black, White, and Red		Hachi Ishie	VIZ Media	Nominee	
2022	The Ragged-Trousered Philanthropists	Robert Tressell	Sophie and Scarlett Rickard	SelfMadeHero	Nominee	
2023	Chivalry	Neil Gaiman	Colleen Doran	Dark Horse Comics	Winner	
2023	Rain	Joe Hill	David M. Booher and Zoe Thorogood	Syzygy/Image	Nominee	
2023	Ten Days in a Madhouse	Nellie Bly	Brad Ricca and Courtney Sieh	Gallery 13/Simon & Schuster	Nominee	
2023	Tori Amos: Little Earthquakes, The Graphic Album	Tori Amos	Rantz Hoseley (ed.)	Z2	Nominee	
2023	A Visit to Moscow	Rabbi Rafael Grossman	Anna Olswanger and Yevgenia Nayberg	Turner	Nominee	
2024	Watership Down	Richard Adams	James Sturm and Joe Sutphin	Ten Speed Graphic	Winner	
2024	Bea Wolf		Zach Weinersmith and Boulet	First Second Books/Macmillan	Nominee	
2024	#DRCL midnight children, vol. 1	Bram Stoker	Shin-ichi Sakamoto, trans. by Caleb Cook	Viz Media	Nominee	
2024	H.P. Lovecraft's The Shadow over Innsmouth	H. P. Lovecraft	Gou Tanabe, trans. by Zack Davisson	Dark Horse Comics	Nominee	
2024	The Monkey King: The Complete Odyssey	Wu Cheng'en	Chaiko, trans. by Dan Christensen	Magnetic	Nominee	
2025	The Road: A Graphic Novel Adaptation	Cormac McCarthy	Emmanuel Larcenet	Abrams	Winner	
2025	Thomas Piketty’s Capital & Ideology: A Graphic Novel Adaptation	Thomas Piketty	Claire Alet and Benjamin Adam	Abrams ComicArts	Nominee	
2025	The Hidden Life of Trees	Peter Wohlleben	Benjamin Flao and Fred Bernard	Greystone	Nominee	
2025	Winnie-the-Pooh	A. A. Milne	Travis Dandro	Drawn & Quarterly	Nominee	
2025	The Worst Journey in the World, Volume 1: Making Our Easting Down	Apsley Cherry-Garrard	Sarah Airriess	Iron Circus	Nominee	
2026	Lord of the Flies: The Graphic Novel	William Golding	Aimée De Jongh	Penguin Classics	Winner	
2026	Alanna: The First Adventure (Song of the Lioness, Book 1)	Tamora Pierce	Vita Ayala, Sama Beck	Abrams Fanfare	Nominee	
2026	The Compleat Angler: A Graphic Adaptation	Izaak Walton	Gareth Brookes	SelfMadeHero	Nominee	
2026	Dead Man Walking: Graphic Edition	Sister Helen Prejean	Rose Vines, Catherine Anyango Grünewald	Random House	Nominee	
2026	Ghost Boys: The Graphic Novel	Jewell Parker Rhodes	Setor Fiadzigbey	Little, Brown Ink	Nominee	
2026	A Wizard of Earthsea: A Graphic Novel	Ursula K. Le Guin	Fred Fordham	Clarion Books	Nominee	
