= List of Domestic Girlfriend chapters =

The chapters of the Japanese manga Domestic Girlfriend are written and illustrated by Kei Sasuga.

== Volumes ==
No.	Original release date	Original ISBN	English release date	English ISBN
1	July 17, 2014	978-4-06-395137-0	April 11, 2017	978-1-68-233651-9
1. "I Want To Grow Up Soon" (はやくはやくオトナになりたい, Hayaku Hayaku Otona ni Naritai); 2. "Under the Same Roof?!" (まさかの1つ屋根の下, Masakano Hitotsu Yane no Shita); 3. "Unable To Communicate" (うまく言えない, Umaku Ienai); 4. "Signs" (兆し, Kizashi); 5. "The Real You" (本当のあなたは, Hontō no Anata wa); Extra. "First Vacation" (はじめてのホリディ, Hajimete no Horidi)
2	September 17, 2014	978-4-06-395195-0	May 9, 2017	978-1-68-233674-8
6. "An Adult's World" (オ卜ナの世界, Otona no Sekai); 7. "What Do You Want To Do?" (どうしたい?, Dō Shitai?); 8. "Commence Operation!" (作戦決行!, Sakusen Kekkō!); 9. "Confrontation" (対峙, Taiji); 10. "Report" (報告, Hōkoku); 11. "A New Love" (新たなる恋, Arata naru Koi); 12. "Love Rivals...?" (恋敵...?, Koigataki...?); 13. "Making Up" (仲直り, Nakanaori); 14. "What Would You Do?" (あなたならどうする, Anata Nara Dō Suru); 15. "Resolve" (覚悟, Kakugo)
3	November 17, 2014	978-4-06-395248-3	June 13, 2017	978-1-68-233675-5
16. "A Girl Named Momo" (モモという娘, Momo to iu Musume); 17. "Club Activities" (部活, Bukatsu); 18. "Forced?" (強制?, Kyōsei?); 19. "Heartthrob...?" (ときめき...?, Tokimeki...?); 20. "Malaise" (違和感, Iwakan); 21. "We're Family..." (家族だろ..., Kazoku Daro...); 22. "Sorry" (ごめんね?, Gomen ne?); 23. "Sensei..." (先生..., Sensei...); 24. "Bummer" (やりきれない, Yarikirenai); 25. "The First Day of Camping!" (キャンプ初日!, Kyanpu Shonichi!); Bonus manga. "Domestic People" (ドメスティックな人々, Domesutikkuna Hitobito)
4	February 17, 2015	978-4-06-395294-0	July 11, 2017	978-1-68-233735-6
26. "Wavering" (揺れる, Yureru); 27. "Self-aware" (自覚, Jikaku); 28. "Inexplicable" (言葉にならない, Kotoba ni Naranai); 29. "New Friend"; 30. "Melting..." (溶ける..., Tokeru...); 31. "Decision" (決断, Ketsudan); 32. "Hina's Resolve" (ヒナの決意, Hina no Ketsui); 33. "True Feelings" (本心, Honshin); 34. "The Distance Between Them" (二人の距離, Futari no Kyori); 35. "Door" (扉, Tobira)
5	May 15, 2015	978-4-06-395394-7	August 22, 2017	978-1-68-233736-3
36. "Suspicions" (ある疑惑, Aru Giwaku); 37. "Secret" (秘密, Himitsu); 38. "Heightened Suspicions" (深まりゆく疑惑, Fukamari Yuku Giwaku); 39. "Cultural Festival" (文化祭, Bunkasai); 40. "Revenge" (復讐, Fukushū); 41. "The Fate of Unrequited Feelings" (片想いのゆく末, Kataomoi no Yukusue); 42. "Kiriya's Secret" (桐谷の秘密, Kiriya no Himitsu); 43. "Nursing" (看病, Kanbyō); 44. "Lie" (嘘, Uso); 45. "Rain" (雨, Ame); Extra. "Sweet Home Magic"
6	August 17, 2015	978-4-06-395462-3	September 12, 2017	978-1-68-233737-0
46. "Heartbreak" (失恋, Shitsuren); 47. "Declaration" (宣言, Sengen); 48. "Respective Kisses" (それぞれのキス, Sorezore no Kisu); 49. "Field Trip Time!" (キメるぜっ修学旅行!, Kimeru ze Sshūgaku Ryokō!); 50. "Disaster At Sea!" (流されてハプニング!, Nagasarete Hapuningu!); 51. "A Dangerous Night" (危険な夜..., Kiken'na Yoru...); 52. "Al's Secret" (アルの秘, Aru no Himitsu); 53. "Hina's Innermost Feelings" (ヒナの胸中, Hina no Kyōchū); 54. "Name" (名前, Namae); 55. "Promise" (約束, Yakusoku); Extra. "Sweet Home Magic"
7	November 17, 2015	978-4-06-395534-7	October 3, 2017	978-1-68-233887-2
56. "A Step Forward" (踏み出した一歩, Fumidashita Ippo); 57. "Novelist" (小説家, Shōsetsuka); 58. "Ignition" (点火, Tenka); 59. "Detected" (察知, Satchi); 60. "Eloping" (逃避行, Tōhikō); 61. "The Near Future" (近い将来, Chikai Shōrai); 62. "Happy Times" (幸福な時間, Kōfukuna Jikan); 63. "Hina's Decision" (陽菜の選択, Hina no Sentaku); 64. "Letter" (手紙, Tegami); Extra. "Night of the Okinawa Trip" (沖縄の夜の夢, Okinawa no Yoru no Yume)
8	February 17, 2016	978-4-06-395599-6	October 17, 2017	978-1-68-233888-9
65. "Breakup" (別れ, Wakare); 66. "Writhing" (もがき, Mogaki); 67. "A New Year Without Hina" (陽菜のいない新年, Hina no Inai Shin'nen); 68. "Rui's Determination" (瑠衣の決意, Rui no Ketsui); 69. "Natsuo's Resolve" (夏生の覚悟, Natsuo no Kakugo); 70. "Turning Point" (転機, Tenki); 71. "Celebration" (お祝い, Oiwai); 72. "Cinderella in the Sheets" (ベッドの中のシンデレラ, Beddo no Naka no Shinderera); 73. "A New Wind" (新たな風, Aratana Kaze); 74. "Hostility" (敵意, Tekii); Extra. "Sweet Home Magic"
9	May 17, 2016	978-4-06-395678-8	October 31, 2017	978-1-68-233889-6
75. "Contest" (勝負, Shōbu); 76. "Conclusion" (決着, Ketchaku); 77. "Reunion" (再会, Saikai); 78. "Wavering Determination" (揺らぐ決意, Yuragu Ketsui); 79. "Budding Feelings?" (芽生えた気持ち?, Mebaeta Kimochi?); 80. "Momo and Ritsu (Part 1)" (ももと律1, Momo to Ritsu Ichi); 81. "Momo and Ritsu (Part 2)" (ももと律2, Momo to Ritsu Ni); 82. "What's Important" (大切なモノ, Taisetsuna Mono); 83. "Uncovered Feelings" (気づいてしまった想い, Kidzuite Shimatta Omoi); 84. "Sweetheart" (想い人, Omoi Hito); Extra. "Sweet Home Magic"
10	August 17, 2016	978-4-06-395734-1	November 14, 2017	978-1-68-233890-2
85. "Squeezed-out Answer" (しぼりだした答え, Shibori Dashita Kotae); 86. "Found it!" (見つけた!, Mitsuketa!); 87. "What Makes One Happiest" (一番の幸せ, Ichiban no Shiawase); 88. "An Assassin Attacks?!" (刺客、襲来!?, Shikaku, Shūrai!?); 89. "As a Father..." (父として..., Chichi to Shite...); 90. "Memories" (思い出, Omoide); 91. "Bra-bra Panic" (ブラブラ・パニック, Burabura・Panikku); 92. "Far Apart" (遠く離れて, Tōku Hanarete); 93. "Destiny's Practical Joke" (運命のいたずら, Unmei no Itazura); 94. "What the Heart Wants..." (心のままに..., Kokoro no Mamani...); Side. "Go, Go, Spa Land!" (健康ランドでGO, Kenkō Rando de GO); Extra. "Sweet Home Magic"
11	November 17, 2016	978-4-06-395799-0	November 28, 2017	978-1-64-212028-8
95. "Lie" (嘘, Uso); 96. "Sudden Intimacy" (急接近, Kyū Sekkin); 97. "Respective Resolve" (それぞれの覚悟, Sorezore no Kakugo); 98. "Mistake...?" (過ち......?, Ayamachi......?); 99. "Style" (流儀, Ryūgi); 100. "Interview" (取材, Shuzai); 101. "That's All?" (それだけ?, Sore Dake?); 102. "About Juri" (樹里のこと, Juri no Koto); 103. "Acting" (演技, Engi); 104. "Night of the Storm" (嵐の夜, Arashi no Yoru); Extra. "Sweet Home Magic"
12	February 17, 2017	978-4-06-395870-6; ISBN 978-4-06-362351-2 (special edition)	December 12, 2017	978-1-64-212029-5
105. "All Alone" (二人っきり, Futarikkiri); 106. "Natsuo's Answer" (夏生の答え, Natsuo no Kotae); 107. "The Time to Choose" (選択の時, Sentaku no Toki); 108. "Everyone's Cultural Festival" (それぞれの文化祭, Sorezore no Bunkasai); 109. "Trouble?!" (トラブル発生!?, Toraburu Hassei!?); 110. "One More Time Around" (もう一周, Mō Isshu); 111. "Today's the Day!" (今日こそ!, Kyō Koso!); 112. "Serious" (本気, Honki); 113. "The Culmination of Feelings" (想いの行方, Omoi no Yukue); 114. "Decision" (決断, Ketsudan); Extra. "Change!"
13	May 17, 2017	978-4-06-395942-0	December 26, 2017	978-1-64-212030-1
115. "Confession" (告白, Kokuhaku); 116. "Changing Relationship" (変わりゆく関係, Kawariyuku Kankei); 117. "And Then" (それから, Sore Kara); 118. "Future Decisions" (将来への選択, Shōrai e no Sentaku); 119. "Will You..." (ここで俺と..., Koko de Ore to...); 120. "When Bodies Unite" (瞬間、身体、重ねて, Shunkan, Karada, Kasanete); 121. "The Cynical Girl and the Young Buck" (卑屈女と青春男, Hikutsu on'na to Seishun Otoko); 122. "The Ugly Duckling" (みにくいアヒルの子, Minikui Ahiru no Ko); 123. "Moving On" (過去との訣別, Kako to no Ketsubetsu); 124. "Spread Your Wings" (羽を伸ばして, Hane o Nobashite); Extra. "Date"
14	July 14, 2017	978-4-06-510068-4; 978-4-06-510127-8 (special edition)	January 9, 2018	978-1-64-212031-8
125. "Always Together..." (ずっと一緒に..., Zutto Isshoni...); 126. "True Family" (本当の家族, Hontō no Kazoku); 127. "Proof of Love" (愛の証明, Ai no Shōmei); 128. "Peach Camouflage" (桃色偽装計画, Momoiro Gisō Keikaku); 129. "New Year's Reunion" (久々の再会, Hisabisa no Saikai); 130. "Their Little Secret" (ふたりの秘密, Futari no Himitsu); 131. "I can't Bear It" (耐えられない, Taerarenai); 132. "Atonement & Determination" (償いと決意, Tsugunai to Ketsui); 133. "The Meaning Behind the Embrace" (抱擁の意味, Hōyō no Imi); 134. "From Now On" (これから, Kore Kara); Extra. "The Night of the Blizzard" (ふぶきのよるに, Fubuki no Yoru ni)
15	September 15, 2017	978-4-06-510193-3; 978-4-06-510174-2 (special edition)	January 23, 2018	978-1-64-212107-0
135. "Challenge Results" (挑戦の行方, Chōsen no Yukue); 136. "Graduation" (卒業式, Sotsugyōshiki); 137. "Birth of a Relationship" (動き出す関係, Ugokidasu Kankei); 138. "Leaving the Nest" (巣立ち, Sudachi); 139. "Rollercoaster New Life" (波乱の新生活, Haran no Shinseikatsu); 140. "Job Hunting" (就職活動, Shūshokukatsudō); 141. "As An Older Sister?" (姉として？, Ane Toshite); 142. "First Job" (初仕事, Hatsu Shigoto); 143. "Money and Greed" (金と欲望, Kane to Yokubō); 144. "True Feelings Overflow" (溢れる本音, Afureru Honne)
16	November 17, 2017	978-4-06-510386-9; 978-4-06-510823-9 (special edition)	March 27, 2018	978-1-64-212155-1
145. "Paper-thin Relationship" (紙一重の関係, Kamihitoe no Kankei); 146. "Balance Crumbles" (崩れる均衡, Kuzureru Kinkō); 147. "For the Future" (これからのために, Korekara no Tameni); 148. "Ritual of Determination" (決意の儀式, Ketsui no Gishiki); 149. "The Outcome of Resolve" (覚悟の末に, Kakugo no Sueni); 150. "Rashness & Regret" (暴走と後悔, Bōsō to Kōkai); 151. "First Group Project" (はじめての共同作業, Hajimete no Kyōdōsagyō); 152. "I Wanna Take Your Virginity" (君の童貞を食べたい, Kimi no Dōtei o Tabetai); 153. "Familial Relationship" (家族としての関係, Kazoku Toshite no Kankei); 154. "Unforsakable Memories" (捨てられない思い出, Suterarenai Omoide); Extra. "Love Talk" (恋話, Koibana)
17	February 16, 2018	978-4-06-510964-9; 978-4-06-510965-6 (limited edition)	May 22, 2018	978-1-64-212243-5
155. "A New Form of Love" (新たな愛の形, Aratana Ai no Katachi); 156. "Sisterly Schism" (姉妹の溝, Shimai no Mizo); 157. "Feelings Set in Motion" (動き出す思い, Ugokidasu Omoi); 158. "When Life Doesn't Go Your Way" (ままならない人生, Mamanaranai Jinsei); 159. "Ever-changing Normalcy" (変わりゆく普通, Kawariyuku Futsū); 160. "Comfort to the Troubled" (悩める人には慰めを, Nayameru Hito ni wa Nagusame o); 161. "The Definition of Happiness" (幸せの定義, Shiawase no Teigi); 162. "Looking Beyond" (先を見据えて, Saki o Misuete); 163. "To a New Self" (新たな自分へ, Aratana Jibun e); 164. "Woes of Youth" (若者たちの葛藤, Wakamono-tachi no Kattō); Extra. "Close Siblings, Mao & Leo" (なかよし姉弟 まおとれお, Nakayoshi Shitei Mao to Reo)
18	April 17, 2018	978-4-06-511268-7; 978-4-06-511269-4 (limited edition)	May 28, 2019	978-1-64-212902-1
165. "If it's Hopeless, Then..." (叶わないなら, Kanawanai Nara); 166. "The Outcome of Friendship" (友情の末に, Yūjō no Sueni); 167. "Still, I..." (それでも私は, Soredemo Watashi wa); 168. "Irregularity Detected in a Lovestruck Girl" (恋する少女に異変あり, Koisuru Shōjō ni Ihen Ari); 169. "Narrowing Options" (狭まりゆく選択肢, Sebamariyuku Sentakushi); 170. "But the Heart..." (それでも心は, Soredemo Kokoro wa); 171. "Yet Life Goes On" (それでも日々が続くなら, Soredemo Hibi ga Tsuzuku Nara); 172. "A New Challenge" (新たな挑戦, Aratana Chōsen); 173. "Life Decisions" (人生の決断, Jinsei no Ketsudan); 174. "Unforgettable Love" (忘れられない愛, Wasurerarenai Ai); Extra. "Sometimes I Think About When We Had Only Just Met" (時には出会った頃の話を, Tokiniwa Deatta Koro no Hanashi o)
19	July 7, 2018	978-4-06-511788-0; 978-4-06-511790-3 (special edition)	July 30, 2019	978-1-64-212953-3
175. "Fresh Start" (再出発, Saishuppatsu); 176. "Crossroads & Reminiscing" (転機と回顧, Tenki to Kaiko); 177. "Trying to Change" (変わろうとして, Kawarō Toshite); 178. "Just Friends" (ただの友達, Tada no Tomodachi); 179. "Someone Like You" (あなたみたいな人, Anata Mitaina Hito); 180. "Yet Another Side" (さらなる一面, Saranaru Ichimen); 181. "Stalker" (ストーカー, Sutōkā); 182. "Anxiety" (途切れぬ不安, Togirenu Fuan); 183. "Exposed" (露呈, Rotei); 184. "Settlement" (決着, Ketchaku)
20	October 17, 2018	978-4-06-512990-6; 978-4-06-513636-2 (special edition)	August 27, 2019	978-1-64-212988-5
185. "Sacrifice" (犠牲, Gisei); 186. "I'm Begging You..." (お願いだから, Onegaidakara); 187. "Will I See You Again?" (また会える？, Mata aeru?); 188. "Signs of Life" (生きている証, Ikiteiru Akashi); 189. "Destiny & Determination" (運命と決意, Unmei to Ketsui); 190. "Give Everything" (全てをかけて, Subete o Kakete); 191. "A Crossroads of Happiness" (幸福の分かれ道, Kōfuku no Wakaremichi); 192. "The State of Love" (夢の在り方, Yume no Arikata); 193. "Love Lesson" (恋のレッスン, Koi no Ressun); 194. "Sexy Undies Are a Lady's Battle Armor" (勝負下着は女の鎧, Shōbu Shitagi wa On'na no Yoroi)
21	December 17, 2018	978-4-06-513483-2; 978-4-06-514118-2 (special edition)	September 24, 2019	978-1-64-659030-8
195. "Bloodbath Brewing?!" (修羅場勃発!?, Shuraba Boppatsu!?); 196. "Catfight" (キャットファイト, Kyatto Faito); 197. "Prison Visit" (再会, Saikai); 198. "Promise & Departure" (約束と旅立ち, Yakusoku to Tabidachi); 199. "After the Festival" (祭りのあと, Matsuri no Ato); 200. "Long-distance Relationship" (遠距離恋愛, Enkyorirenai); 201. "If It's Not Too Much to Ask" (叶うことなら, Kanaukotonara); 202. "Stepbrother & Stepsister" (義姉と義弟, Ane to Otōto); 203. "A Message, and An Audience" (伝えたいこと 伝えたい人, Tsutaetai Koto Tsutaetai Hito); 204. "Family Trip" (家族旅行, Kazokuryokō); Extra. "Kiss Quota" (kiss quota-キスノルマ-, Kiss quota-Kisu Noruma-)
22	March 15, 2019	978-4-06-514423-7; 978-4-06-515067-2 (special edition)	October 29, 2019	978-1-64-659095-7
205. "A Night Exposed" (おはだけナイト, Oha dake Naito); 206. "Your Stage" (あなたの舞台, Anata no Butai); 207. "One Night in New York" (ニューヨークの夜に。, Nyū Yōku no Yoru ni.); 208. "Worth the Risk" (懸ける価値, Kakeru Kachi); 209. "Blank" (まっ白, Masshiro); 210. "A Certain Writer's Past" (或る作家の過去, Aru Sakka no Kako); 211. "As a Father, as a Daughter" (父として，娘として, Chichi toshite, Musume toshite); 212. "A Declaration of War" (宣戦布告, Sensenfukoku); 213. "A Familiar Face" (懐かしい顔, Natsukashii Kao); 214. "I'm Home!" (ただいま, Tadaima); 215. "When We Were Together" (二人が一つだったころ, Futari ga Hitotsu Datta Koro); Extra. "Recording Session Report!" (「ドメカノ」アニメ アフレコ☆レポート, "Domekano" Anime Afureko Repōto)
23	June 17, 2019	978-4-06-515317-8; 978-4-06-515233-1 (special edition)	January 14, 2020	978-1-64-659206-7
216. "See You Again" (じゃあね, Jāne); 217. "Broken-Hearted Twister" (失恋ツイスター, Shitsuren Tsuisutā); 218. "Bad Girl" (ワルイオンナ, Warui Onna); 219. "An Ally" (同類, Dōrui); 220. "Dreamless People" (夢捨て人, Yume Sutebito); 221. "A Night Together" (2人ぼっちの夜, Futari Bocchi no Yoru); 222. "A Pair of Have-Nots" (何もない2人, Nanimonai Futari); 223. "The Unfulfilled Heart" (埋められないココロ, Umerarenai Kokoro); 224. "Not Just Sympathy" (同情だけじゃない, Dōjō dake Janai); 225. "Even Someone Like Me" (こんなあたしでも, Konna Atashi demo)
24	September 17, 2019	978-4-06-516452-5; 978-4-06-515234-8 (special edition)	April 14, 2020	978-1-64-659286-9
226. "From Now On" (これから, Korekara); 227. "Lunchtime in Manhattan" (マンハッタンで昼食を, Manhattan de Chūshoku o); 228. "Have You Got a Problem With That?" (悪いかよ, Warui ka yo); 229. "Prejudice and Bigotry" (偏見と差別, Henken to Sabetsu); 230. "Promise Me This" (約束して, Yakusoku Shite); 231. "Potential and Choices" (可能性と選択肢, Kanōsei to Sentakushi); 232. "What Connects Us" (繋いでいくこと, Tsunaide Iku Koto); 233. "I Can't Wait Any Longer" (もう、止まらない, Mō, Tomaranai); 234. "I... You" (あなたを, Anata o); 235. "Response in Kind" (本気で返して, Honkide Kaeshite); Extra: "What Are We Eating Tonight?"
25	November 15, 2019	978-4-06-517363-3; 978-4-06-515235-5 (special edition)	June 16, 2020	978-1-64-659663-8
236. "In Your Own Words" (自分の言葉で, Jibun no Kotoba de); 237. "At Least by His Side" (せめて一緒に, Semete Issho ni); 238. "It's a Secret" (秘密だ, Himitsu da); 239. "Kajita's Goal" (梶田の目標, Kajita no Mokuhyō); 240. "Go For It!" (頑張れ！, Ganbare!); 241. "A Sister's Motive" (「姉」の本音, Ane no Hon'ne); 242. "Even If We're Apart" (別れてもなお, Wakarete mo Nao); 243. "I Need You" (君じゃなきゃ, Kimi Janakya); 244. "The Promise We Made" (あの日の約束, Ano Hi no Yakusoku); 245. "Do you think about her?" (気になる？, Ki ni Naru?); Extra. "Girls' Libido"
26	February 17, 2020	978-4-06-518454-7; 978-4-06-519259-7 (special edition)	August 11, 2020	978-1-64-659630-0
246. "What Kind of Answer..." (どんな答えを, Don'na kotae o); 247. "Just the Ticket" (いい方法, Ī hōhō); 248. "A New Job" (新しい仕事, Atarashī shigoto); 249. "Decision Time" (選択の時, Sentaku no toki); 250. "It's Okay" (大丈夫だよ, Daijōbudayo); 251. "Your Thoughts" (君たちの思想, Kimitachi no shisō); 252. "To Be By Your Side" (きみのもとへ, Kimi no moto e); 253. "I Can't Hide Anymore" (もう隠せない, Mō kakusenai); 254. "The Final Dedication" (最後の献身, Saigo no kenshin); 255. "Returning the Favor" (恩返し, Ongaeshi); Extra. "Love So Sweet"
27	May 15, 2020	978-4-06-518855-2; 978-4-06-518862-0 (special edition)	October 13, 2020	978-1-64-659752-9
256. "Sensei Would" (先生なら, Sensei nara); 257. "Happiness" (幸せ, Shiawase); 258. "Our Future" (二人のこれから, Futari no Kore Kara); 259. "Revelations and Reports" (発覚と報告, Hakkaku to Hōkoku); 260. "Rui's Return" (ルイの帰国, Rui no Kikoku); 261. "Sincere Words" (本気の言葉, Honki no Kotoba); 262. "Permission to Marry" (結婚の許し, Kekkon no Yurushi); 263. "Marriage Announcement" (結婚報告, Kekkon Hōkoku); 264. "Beyond "Pathways" " (「道」のその先, `Michi' no sono-saki); 265. "The Raconteur's Struggle" (落伍者のあがき, Rakugo-sha no Agaki); Extra. "Everyone's Evenings" (それぞれの夜, Sorezore no Yoru)
28	August 17, 2020	978-4-06-520338-5; 978-4-06-520339-2 (special edition)	February 9, 2021	978-1-64-659955-4
266. "The Return of Tanabe" (種部ふたたび, Tanebe Futatabi); 267. "Wriggling Malevolence" (蠢く悪意, Ugomeku Akui); 268. "For You" (あなたのために, Anata no Tame ni); 269. "Dashed Hopes" (絶たれた希望, Tatareta Kibō); 270. "I'll Always..." (心から..., Kokorokara...); 271. "A Cruel Reality" (残酷な現実, Zankokuna Genjitsu); 272. "Things Left Behind" (残されたもの, Nokosa reta Mono); 273. "Love" (大好き, Daisuki); 274. "I'll Give You My Life" (人生をかけて, Jinsei o Kakete); 275. "Soulmates" (運命の人, Unmei no Hito); 276. "Domestic Girlfriend" (ドメスティックな彼女, Domesutikku na Kanojo)
Ex	August 17, 2020	978-4-06-520340-8	—	—
Extra. "The Night Before Domestic Lover"; Extra. "Night Before School Trip"; Extra. "Sweet Memories"; Extra. "Love Love Show"; Extra. "First Love"; Extra. "Reason For Us To Journey"; Extra. "Memories with Rui"; Extra. "Days with Hina"; Extra. "After Days"; Extra. "Filling Lips"; Extra. "The Secret Door Flickers Open"
