= Innocent (manga) =

Japanese manga series by Shin-ichi Sakamoto

- First tankōbon volume cover

イノサン (Inosan)
- Genre: Historical, suspense
- Manga
- Written by: Shin-ichi Sakamoto
- Published by: Shueisha
- English publisher: NA: Dark Horse Comics
- Imprint: Young Jump Comics
- Magazine: Weekly Young Jump
- Original run: January 31, 2013 – April 16, 2015
- Volumes: 9
- Manga

Innocent Rouge
- Written by: Shin-ichi Sakamoto
- Published by: Shueisha
- English publisher: NA: Dark Horse Comics
- Imprint: Young Jump Comics
- Magazine: Grand Jump
- Original run: May 20, 2015 – January 8, 2020
- Volumes: 12
- icon

Innocent (Japanese: イノサン, Hepburn: Inosan; from the French word) is a Japanese manga series written and illustrated by Shin-ichi Sakamoto, based on Masakatsu Adachi's book The Executioner Sanson. It was published in Shueisha's seinen manga magazine Weekly Young Jump from January 2013 to April 2015, and compiled into nine tankōbon volumes. A sequel, Innocent Rouge, was serialized in Grand Jump from May 2015 to January 2020, and compiled into twelve tankōbon volumes. Innocent's story follows the Sanson family of executioners in France before the French Revolution, and centers around siblings Charles-Henri Sanson and Marie-Joseph Sanson.

== Plot ==
Set in 18th-century France, the story follows the final decades of the monarchy and the impending arrival of the French Revolution. The story follows Charles-Henri Sanson, the fourth-generation head of the Sanson family, who are appointed as the royal executioners of Paris. Kind, sensitive, and deeply conflicted, Charles-Henri recoils from the violence required in his inherited role, yet ultimately accepts his fate as Monsieur de Paris in order to preserve his family's status. As he carries out executions in the name of royal justice, he struggles to reconcile his personal ideals, vowing to become the last Sanson to bear the burden of executioner.

As the narrative progresses, the focus expands beyond Charles-Henri to encompass his family and the turbulent era around them. In particular, his younger sister Marie-Joseph Sanson emerges as a central figure: cold, rebellious, and defiant of gender norms, she seeks power and autonomy in a patriarchal society. Her ambition to participate in executions and her entanglement with figures such as Marie Antoinette put her in danger as the unrest in France reaches a boiling point.

== Characters ==
- Charles-Henri Sanson
- Marie-Joseph Sanson (younger sister of Charles-Henri Sanson)

== Media ==
=== Manga ===
Innocent is written and illustrated by Shin-ichi Sakamoto. The manga was serialized in Shueisha's seinen manga magazine Weekly Young Jump from January 31, 2013, to April 16, 2015. Shueisha collected its chapters in nine tankōbon volumes, released from June 19, 2013, to May 19, 2015. During their Anime NYC 2022 panel, Dark Horse Comics announced that it had licensed the manga and released it in three 3-in-1 omnibus volumes from November 22, 2023, to December 3, 2024.

A sequel, Innocent Rouge was serialized in Shueisha's Grand Jump from May 20, 2015, to January 8, 2020. Shueisha collected its chapters in twelve tankōbon released from October 19, 2015, to February 19, 2020. In February 2025, Dark Horse Comics announced that it had acquired Innocent Rouge. The first 3-in-1 omnibus volume was released on October 21, 2025.

==== Volumes ====
===== Innocent =====
No.	Original release date	Original ISBN	English release date	English ISBN
1	June 19, 2013	978-4-08-879565-2	November 22, 2023	978-1-5067-3824-6
2	September 19, 2013	978-4-08-879708-3	November 22, 2023	978-1-5067-3824-6
3	December 19, 2013	978-4-08-879718-2	November 22, 2023	978-1-5067-3824-6
4	March 19, 2014	978-4-08-879768-7	May 1, 2024	978-1-5067-3825-3
5	June 19, 2014	978-4-08-879854-7	May 1, 2024	978-1-5067-3825-3
6	September 19, 2014	978-4-08-879898-1	May 1, 2024	978-1-5067-3825-3
7	December 19, 2014	978-4-08-890076-6	December 3, 2024	978-1-5067-3826-0
8	March 19, 2015	978-4-08-890128-2	December 3, 2024	978-1-5067-3826-0
9	May 19, 2015	978-4-08-890195-4	December 3, 2024	978-1-5067-3826-0

===== Innocent Rouge =====
No.	Original release date	Original ISBN	English release date	English ISBN
1	October 19, 2015	978-4-08-890267-8	October 21, 2025	978-1-5067-4867-2
2	May 19, 2016	978-4-08-890414-6	October 21, 2025	978-1-5067-4867-2
3	July 19, 2016	978-4-08-890503-7	October 21, 2025	978-1-5067-4867-2
4	October 19, 2016	978-4-08-890535-8	May 26, 2026	978-1-5067-4868-9
5	March 17, 2017	978-4-08-890620-1	May 26, 2026	978-1-5067-4868-9
6	August 18, 2017	978-4-08-890736-9	May 26, 2026	978-1-5067-4868-9
7	December 19, 2017	978-4-08-890834-2	October 13, 2026	978-1-5067-4869-6
8	June 19, 2018	978-4-08-891032-1	October 13, 2026	978-1-5067-4869-6
9	November 19, 2018	978-4-08-891131-1	October 13, 2026	978-1-5067-4869-6
10	May 17, 2019	978-4-08-891292-9	May 11, 2027	978-1-5067-4870-2
11	November 19, 2019	978-4-08-891412-1	May 11, 2027	978-1-5067-4870-2
12	February 19, 2020	978-4-08-891486-2	May 11, 2027	978-1-5067-4870-2

=== Stage musical ===
A stage musical adaptation took place in November 2019 and starred Mika Nakashima in her musical acting debut.

== Reception ==
In 2013, Innocent was one of the Jury Selections of the Manga Division at the 17th Japan Media Arts Festival Awards. In 2014, it was nominated for the 18th Tezuka Osamu Cultural Prize Reader Award. In 2015, it was nominated for the eighth Manga Taishō. Innocent Rouge received an Excellence Award at the 24th Japan Media Arts Festival in 2021. It was nominated at the Japan Society and Anime NYC's second American Manga Awards for Best Continuing Manga Series in 2025.
