= Ghost Boys =

2018 middle-grade novel by Jewell Parker Rhodes

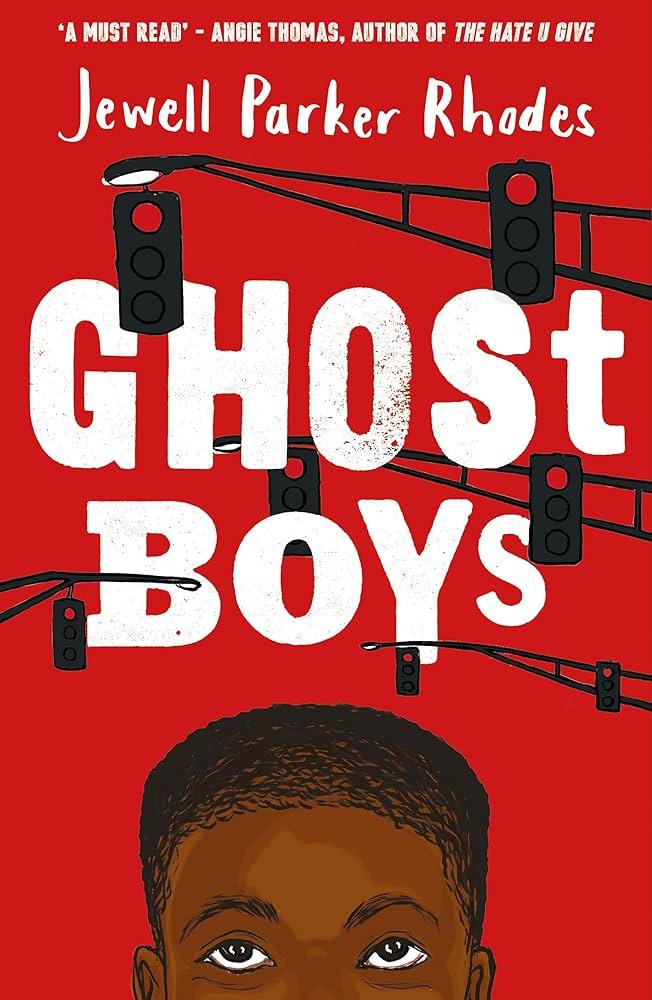
Front cover of the book.

Ghost Boys is a 2018 middle-grade novel by Jewell Parker Rhodes. Set in Chicago, the novel follows the story of Jerome, a 12-year-old black boy who is shot and killed by a white police officer before coming back as a ghost. Emmett Till, a black boy who was murdered in 1955, features as another ghost in the text. Rhodes' novel has themes of racism and socio-economic injustice that are aimed at a younger audience.

== Synopsis ==
The action of the text takes place in Chicago. The novel opens with the death of Jerome, a 12-year-old black boy who has been killed by a police officer. Jerome had been playing with a toy gun, which the police officer had mistaken for a real gun. The chapters alternate between "DEAD" and "ALIVE", with the former being narrated by Jerome as a ghost in the present, and the latter being narrated by Jerome in the past when he was still alive. As a ghost, Jerome witnesses various scenes in the aftermath of his death, such as his family's grief and the preliminary hearing of Officer Moore, the police officer who shot him.

As a ghost, Jerome meets the ghost of Emmett Till, who shows him hundreds of other 'ghost boys' who have been killed like them. Officer Moore's daughter, Sarah, also features as a significant character in the text, as well as Jerome's friend, Carlos (who gave him the toy gun) and Jerome's younger sister Kim.

== Production ==
Rhodes drew heavily from real life instances of violence against black children, such as the cases of Tamir Rice and Emmett Till. In an interview, Rhodes revealed that she would have to stop writing for months at a time due to the emotional process of writing Ghost Boys.

== Reception ==
The novel was praised upon its release, with Kirkus Reviews labelling it a "timely, challenging book that is worthy of a read, further discussion and action". It was awarded the 2019 Walter Dean Meyers Award, Younger Readers Category by the nonprofit We Need Diverse Books, who donated 2000 copies of the book to US schools with limited budgets. It was a New York Times bestseller and, according to one report, has won "at least 30 awards".

Following the Black Lives Matter protests of 2020, there was renewed interest in a book that explored issues of racism and police violence.

In February 2022, Ghost Boys was translated into Persian for sale in Iran.

In 2026, a graphic novel adaption illustrated by Setor Fiadzigbey was published by Hachette.

=== Controversy ===
The book was also met with some controversy from within the police force. Paul Kempinski, district director for Florida State Fraternal Order of Police District 5, labelled the book "propaganda that pushes an inaccurate and absurd stereotype of police officers in America". He argued that the book's themes were inappropriate for such a young audience. This sentiment was challenged by both Alaina Lavoie (spokesperson for We Need Diverse Books) who pointed out that "research indicates that kids form biases at a young age", and Rhodes, who argued that children are "sophisticated and knowledgeable about inequities in the world".

Kempinski wrote a letter to the Broward County School Board asking for the book to be removed from the fifth-grade syllabus. In 2021, the school board complied with the request, temporarily banning the book pending a review. Similarly, in 2020, the book was banned in a California school after a parental complaint about the political viewpoint expressed in the text. A ban was also sought in Texas, with one parent worried that the text could cause white children to be "ashamed" of their skin colour.

=== Awards ===
Ghost Boys has won a number of awards and accolades, including:

Year	Award/honor	Result	Ref
2018	New Atlantic Independent Booksellers Association Book of the Year (Middle Grade)	Won	
2019	The E. B. White Read Aloud Award (Middle Reader)	Won	
2019	Kids' Book Choice Awards	Won	
2019	Walter Dean Myers Award (Young Readers Category)	Won	
2019	Jane Addams Children's Book Award for a Book for Older Children	Won	
2019	Charlotte Huck Award	Honor	
2025	Graphic Novels & Comics Round Table's Best Graphic Novels for Children (for graphic novel adaption)	Top Ten	
2026	Eisner Award for Best Adaptation From Another Medium (for graphic novel adaption)	Nominated	

== Film adaptation ==
In 2021, Entertainment Studios Motion Pictures acquired the rights to the novel. Amy Baer and Michael Besman were brought on to develop and produce the project, with Byron Allen, Carolyn Folks and Jennifer Lucas to serve as executive producers. Baer's associate, Chris Ceccotti, will also serve as executive producer. Allen (founder, chair and CEO of Entertainment Studios), became aware of the novel after his daughter was assigned it to read in school. The rights were acquired by ESMP's Head of Acquisition, Chris Charalambous. The project will be overseen by Charalambous and Matthew Singer, ESMP's EVP of Production and Content. Rhodes responded to the announcement saying:

I'm delighted Byron Allen's movie division will create an inspiring feature film to empower us to be more empathetic and to 'bear witness' against social injustice. Protecting all children's innocence and humanity is paramount. I'm not surprised that it was an amazing youth, Mr. Allen's daughter, who helped advocate for Ghost Boys to become a movie. I'm thrilled and humbled to have Ghost Boys adapted and transformed to a new life.

As of August 2021, the project was out for writers to adapt into a screenplay.
