= The Dignity of the Nation =

Book by Masahiko Fujiwara

- Author: Masahiko Fujiwara
- Original title: 国家の品格
- Translator: Giles Murray
- Language: Japanese
- Series: Shinchō shinsho
- Release number: 141
- Subject: Nationalism, Japan
- Publisher: Shinchosha
- Publication date: 2005
- Publication place: Japan
- English publication date: 2007
- Pages: 191
- ISBN: 9784106101410
- OCLC: 62398096

The Dignity of the Nation (国家の品格, Kokka no Hinkaku), also translated as The Dignity of a State or The Dignity of Nations, is a bestselling book by Japanese essayist and mathematician Masahiko Fujiwara. The book has sold more than two million copies in Japan. A bilingual Japanese and English version, translated by Giles Murray, was published in Japan in May 2007 by IBC Publishing under the English title The Dignity of the Nation.

== Overview ==
The title of the book mimics the title of a nationalist pamphlet issued by the Japanese government in 1937. The Dignity of a State criticizes the emphasis on Western logic and individuality in Japanese society, and calls for a return to the value system of bushido. It criticizes democracy, citing Adolf Hitler as an example of a leader using democracy to manipulate citizens. It also criticizes the market economy, which Fujiwara claims is widening the economic gap between the wealthy and impoverished in Japan, and globalism, which Fujiwara claims is only a "strategy of the U.S. that seeks world domination after the Cold War."

A recurring theme of the book is that American ideas of freedom and equality do not even work in the United States, so they should not be applied in Japanese society.

== Reception ==
Andrew Rankin of The Japan Times agreed with some of Fujiwara's criticisms of Western morality, but pointed out that "you can listen to most of Fujiwara’s other ideas for free at any noodle stand in Japan." The book's popularity made "hinkaku" ("dignity") the most popular buzzword of 2006 in Japan. It also inspired books with similar titles and themes, including Mariko Bando's The Dignity of a Woman, which sold more than three million copies.
