= Ero Ninja Scrolls =

Japanese manga series by Haruki

- Cover of the first volume

あらくさ忍法帖 (Arakusa Ninpōchō)
- Genre: Action; Erotic comedy; Historical
- Manga
- Written by: Haruki
- Published by: Hakusensha
- English publisher: NA: Seven Seas Entertainment
- Imprint: Young Animal Comics
- Magazine: Harem
- Original run: November 29, 2018 – present
- Volumes: 11
- icon

Ero Ninja Scrolls (Japanese: あらくさ忍法帖, Hepburn: Arakusa Ninpōchō) is a Japanese manga series written and illustrated by Haruki. It has been serialized in Hakusensha's seinen ecchi-oriented digital manga magazine Harem since November 2018.

== Publication ==
Written and illustrated by Haruki, Ero Ninja Scrolls has been serialized in Hakusensha's seinen ecchi-oriented digital manga magazine Harem since November 29, 2018. Hakusensha has collected its chapters into individual tankōbon volumes. The first volume was released on July 29, 2019. As of June 29, 2026, eleven volumes have been released.

In May 2021, Seven Seas Entertainment announced that they had licensed the manga for English release in North America. The series is being released under its Ghost Ship mature imprint, with the first volume published on November 2, 2021.

=== Volumes ===
No.	Original release date	Original ISBN	English release date	English ISBN
1	July 29, 2019	978-4-592-16371-8	November 2, 2021	978-1-64827-671-2
2	April 28, 2020	978-4-592-16372-5	January 4, 2022	978-1-64827-672-9
3	December 25, 2020	978-4-592-16373-2	June 7, 2022	978-1-63858-276-2
4	August 27, 2021	978-4-592-16374-9	November 29, 2022	978-1-63858-739-2
5	April 27, 2022	978-4-592-16375-6	May 23, 2023	978-1-68579-557-3
6	December 27, 2022	978-4-592-16376-3	August 28, 2024	979-8-88843-083-5
7	October 27, 2023	978-4-592-16377-0	November 19, 2024	979-8-88843-797-1
8	April 26, 2024	978-4-592-16378-7	April 15, 2025	979-8-89373-135-4
9	January 29, 2025	978-4-592-16379-4	September 30, 2025	979-8-89561-672-7
10	November 28, 2025	978-4-592-16420-3	July 21, 2026	979-8-89765-380-5
11	June 29, 2026	978-4-592-16689-4	April 27, 2027	979-8-89863-921-1

== See also ==
- Kisei Jūi Suzune, another manga series created by Haruki
- Watashi no Ecchina Rirekisho Mite Kudasai, another manga series created by Haruki
