= Kisei Jūi Suzune =

Japanese manga series

寄性獣医・鈴音
- Manga
- Written by: Haruki
- Published by: Takeshobo
- English publisher: Project-H
- Imprint: Bamboo Comics
- Magazine: Doki!
- Original run: December 14, 2004 – November 8, 2021.
- Volumes: 14
- Live-action film
- Directed by: Ryu Kaneda
- Released: November 26, 2011

Kisei Jūi Suzune (寄性獣医・鈴音; Parasite Doctor Suzune) is a Japanese manga series by Haruki. It was adapted into a live-action film in 2011.

== Cast ==
- Rei Yoshii - Suzune
- Megumi Kagurazaka - Naomi

== See also ==
- Ero Ninja Scrolls — another manga series created by Haruki
- Watashi no Ecchina Rirekisho Mite Kudasai — another manga series created by Haruki
