= Draft King =

Japanese manga series

- First tankōbon volume cover

ドラフトキング (Dorafuto Kingu)
- Genre: Sports (baseball)
- Manga
- Written by: Tetsurō Kuromatsu
- Published by: Shueisha
- Imprint: Young Jump Comics
- Magazine: Grand Jump
- Original run: November 21, 2018 – present
- Volumes: 26
- Television drama
- Directed by: Toru Yamamoto; Yuta Yoshikawa
- Written by: Kenichi Suzuki
- Music by: Miki Sakurai
- Studio: Robot Communications
- Original network: Wowow
- Original run: April 8, 2023 – June 10, 2023
- Episodes: 10

Draft King (ドラフトキング, Dorafuto Kingu) is a Japanese manga series written and illustrated by Tetsurō Kuromatsu. It began serialization in Shueisha's Grand Jump magazine in November 2018. A live-action television drama adaptation aired from April to June 2023.

== Media ==
=== Manga ===
Written and illustrated by Tetsurō Kuromatsu, Draft King began serialization in Shueisha's Grand Jump magazine on November 21, 2018. Its chapters have been collected into twenty-seven tankōbon volumes as of November 2026.

No.	Release date	ISBN
1	August 19, 2019	978-4-08-891333-9
2	August 19, 2019	978-4-08-891356-8
3	November 19, 2019	978-4-08-891436-7
4	March 19, 2020	978-4-08-891518-0
5	July 17, 2020	978-4-08-891639-2
6	November 19, 2020	978-4-08-891677-4
7	December 18, 2020	978-4-08-891747-4
8	April 19, 2021	978-4-08-891824-2
9	August 18, 2021	978-4-08-892065-8
10	November 19, 2021	978-4-08-892148-8
11	March 18, 2022	978-4-08-892261-4
12	August 19, 2022	978-4-08-892413-7
13	November 17, 2022	978-4-08-892508-0
14	March 17, 2023	978-4-08-892644-5
15	May 19, 2023	978-4-08-892701-5
16	August 18, 2023	978-4-08-892809-8
17	November 17, 2023	978-4-08-893016-9
18	March 18, 2024	978-4-08-893178-4
19	August 19, 2024	978-4-08-893360-3
20	November 19, 2024	978-4-08-893452-5
21	March 18, 2025	978-4-08-893595-9
22	August 19, 2025	978-4-08-893781-6
23	November 19, 2025	978-4-08-893886-8
24	March 18, 2026	978-4-08-894134-9
25	May 19, 2026	978-4-08-894207-0
26	August 19, 2026	978-4-08-894317-6
27	November 18, 2026	978-4-08-894415-9

=== Drama ===
A live-action television drama adaptation was announced on November 16, 2022. The series was produced by Robot Communications and directed by Toru Yamamoto and Yuta Yoshikawa, with Kenichi Suzuki writing scripts, Miki Sakurai composing the music and starred Tsuyoshi Muro in the lead role. The drama aired 10 episodes from April 8 to June 10, 2023.
