= Grand Jump =

Japanese manga magazine by Shueisha

- Categories: Seinen manga
- Frequency: Biweekly
- Circulation: 79,833; (July–September 2026)
- First issue: November 16, 2011
- Company: Shueisha
- Country: Japan
- Language: Japanese
- Website: Grand Jump

Grand Jump (Japanese: グランドジャンプ, Hepburn: Gurando Janpu) is a Japanese biweekly seinen manga magazine published by Shueisha under their Jump line of magazines. Launched in November 2011 as a merging of Business Jump and Super Jump, it carried over nine series from the former and three from the latter in addition to beginning new titles.

== History ==
In July 2011, Shueisha announced they would be merging their seinen manga magazines Business Jump and Super Jump into a single biweekly magazine that fall. They cited the "changing environment for seinen manga and the changing tastes of readers" as their reason for the decision.

Targeted at "liberated adults," Grand Jump is published twice a month in a black and white saddle-stapled format, each issue running about 300 pages. The initial series at launch included 8 serializations carried over from Business Jump as well as 3 from Super Jump, with several new titles beginning. A monthly sister magazine called Grand Jump Premium (グランドジャンプPREMIUM) was also launched, serializing the remaining Business Jump and Super Jump series.

Certain manga, such as Amai Siekatsu and Uramiya Honpo Reboot, were rebranded as Amai Siekatsu: Second Season and Uramiya Honpo Revenge. A few titles, including Mankitsu and Kei Toume's Sing Yesterday for Me, only appear in the magazine monthly.

After appearing only in the first issue, cooking manga Dashi Master was put on indefinite hiatus as Shueisha began investigating claims that the manga had plagiarized images of food found on Google Images.

A recent sequel to Hiroshi Motomiya's Ore no Sora was also carried over from Business Jump, and ended in Grand Jump in early Spring of 2012. In early summer of the same year, the magazine began serializing another title of Hiroshi's, his fourth installment in the Otokogi series.

Starting around issue 13 of 2012, My Night is as Beautiful as your Noon, one of the series launched with the start of the magazine, was moved from the magazine to join a group of several titles serialized exclusively online through Grand Jump's website.

Grand Jump has published several oneshots, including two spin-offs of famed artist Go Nagai's Cutie Honey. It is also home to the latest series by renowned seinen manga artist Toshiki Yui, Saikin kono sekai wa watashi dali no mono ni narimashita.....

In February 2013, the magazine began moving several popular titles from Grand Jump Premium to Grand Jump. One Grand Jump series, Get Big Money, was moved to Premium. In 2018, Grand Jump Premium was rebranded as Grand Jump Mucha.

== Features ==
=== Series from Grand Jump ===
There are currently 16 manga titles being regularly serialized in Grand Jump.

Series Title	Author	Premiered
Captain 2 (キャプテン2)	Moritaka Yūji	May 2021
Dr.Quench (Dr.クインチ)	Suzukawa Keiko	January 2019
Draft King (ドラフトキング)	Kuromatsu Tetsuro	December 2018
#DRCL midnight children	Shin-ichi Sakamoto	January 2021
Issho ni Kurashite Ii desu ka? (一緒に暮らしていいですか？)	Kei Sasuga	November 2023
Kamo no Negi ni wa Doku ga Aru -Kamo Kyōju no "Ningen" Keizagaku Kōgi- (カモのネギには毒がある-加茂教授の"人間"経済学講義-)	Shinobu Kaitani, Takeshi Natsuhara	February 2022
Matataki no Sonya (瞬きのソーニャ)	Hikaru Yuzuki	August 2012
Radiation House (ラジエーションハウス)	Tomohiro Yokomaku, Taishi Mori	November 2015
Torima Minshuku Yadori-teki na! (とりま民宿やどり的な!)	Andou Yuu	September 2023
Tsutte Tabetai Gyaru Sawa-san (釣って食べたいギャル澤さん)	Kazuki Funatsu	June 2024
Uramiya Honpo Diablo (怨み屋本舗 DIABLO)	Shōshō Kurihara	August 2022

=== Series from Grand Jump Mucha ===
There are currently nine manga titles being regularly serialized in Grand Jump Mucha.

Series Title	Author	Premiered
A wo ni yoshi, sore mo yoshi (あをによし、それもよし)	Ishikawa Rose	November 2018
Watashi no Ecchina Rirekisho Mite Kudasai (私のHな履歴書みてください)	Haruki	November 2018

=== Series from Grand Jump Mecha ===
There are currently seven series being regularly serialized in Grand Jump Mecha.

Series Title	Author	Premiered
Kingyou Tsuma (金魚妻)	Kurosawa R	November 2018
Reiko (レイコ)	Maya Miyazaki	November 2018
Seeds of Eros (エロスの種子)	Akiko Monden	November 2018
Watashi no Ecchina Rirekisho Mite Kudasai (私のHな履歴書みてください)	Haruki	November 2018
