= Jewell Parker Rhodes =

American writer (born 1954)

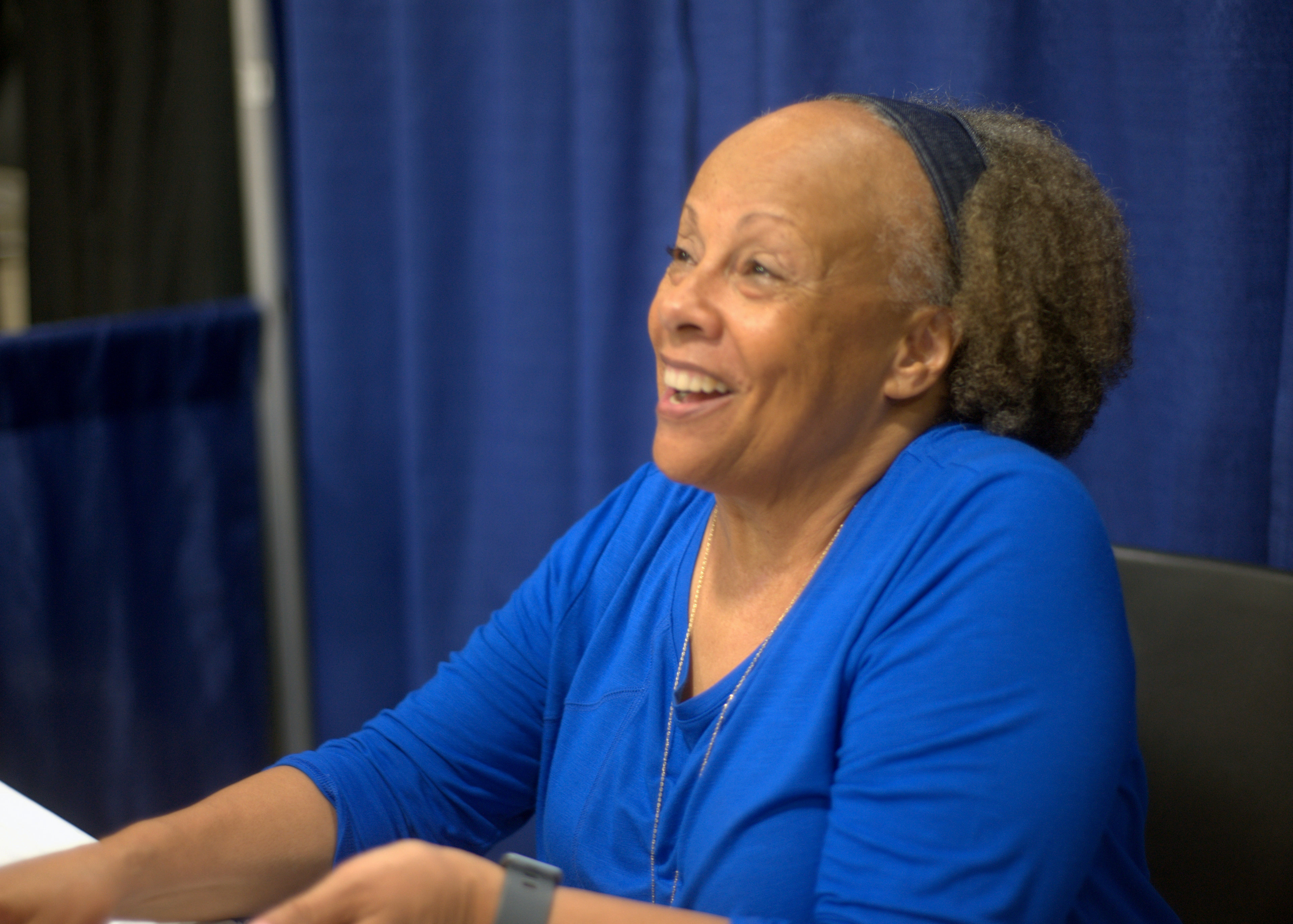
- Born: 1954 (age 71–72); Pittsburgh, Pennsylvania, U.S.
- Education: Carnegie Mellon University
- Occupations: Novelist, professor
- Website: jewellparkerrhodes.com

Jewell Parker Rhodes (born 1954) is an American bestselling novelist and educator.

She is the author of several books for children, including the New York Times bestsellers Will's Race for Home, winner of the Coretta Scott King Book Award; Black Brother, Black Brother; and Ghost Boys, which has garnered more than fifty awards and honors including The Walter Award, the Indies Choice/EB White Read-Aloud Award, and the Jane Addams Children’s Book Award for Older Readers, and was later adapted as Ghost Boys: The Graphic Novel. Rhodes is also the author of Soul Step, Treasure Island: Runaway Gold, Paradise on Fire, Towers Falling and the celebrated Louisiana Girls Trilogy, which includes Ninth Ward, winner of the Coretta Scott King Honor Award; Sugar; and Bayou Magic.

Rhodes has written six adult novels: Voodoo Dreams, Magic City, Douglass’ Women, Season, Moon, and Hurricane, as well as the memoir Porch Stories: A Grandmother’s Guide to Happiness, and two writing guides: Free Within Ourselves: Fiction Lessons for Black Authors and The African American Guide to Writing and Publishing Non-Fiction. A reissue of Magic City, a novel about the 1921 Tulsa Race Massacre, was released in 2021 in recognition of the 100th anniversary. A reissue of Douglass' Women released in February 2026.

Rhodes is a regular speaker at colleges and conferences. The driving force behind all of Jewell’s work is to inspire social justice, equity, and environmental stewardship.

Rhodes is the Founding Artistic Director of the Virginia G. Piper Center for Creative Writing and Narrative Studies Professor and Virginia G. Piper Endowed Chair at Arizona State University. She was awarded an Honorary Doctorate of Humane Letters from Carnegie-Mellon University.

== Early life ==
Rhodes was born and raised in Manchester, a largely African-American neighborhood on the North Side of Pittsburgh. As a child, she was a voracious reader. She began college as a drama major, but switched to writing when she discovered African-American literature for the first time. She received a Bachelor of Arts in Drama Criticism, a Master of Arts in English, and a Doctor of Arts in English (Creative Writing) from Carnegie Mellon University.

== Writing ==
Her work has been widely translated into numerous languages including French, Romanian, German, Korean, Italian, Persian, Mandarin, and Japanese. It has been reproduced in audio and for NPR's "Selected Shorts." She has been a featured speaker at the Runnymede International Literary Festival (University of London-Royal Holloway), Santa Barbara Writers Conference, Creative Nonfiction Writers Conference and Warwick University, among others.

Her recent fiction and essays have been anthologized in Rise Up Singing: Black Women Writers on Motherhood (ed., Berry), In Fact: The Best of Creative Nonfiction (ed. Gutkind), Gumbo (ed., Golden and Harris), and Children of the Night: Best Short Stories By Black Writers (ed., Naylor), along with others.

Many of Rhodes's middle grade novels focus on issues surrounding social justice within black communities throughout history and current events with themes of community. In particular, Ghost Boys, focuses on the racial injustices that pertain to the past and present with the main character experiencing police brutality and connecting with past . Rhodes's work promotes all people within a community to work together with collaborative, respectful, and empathetic manner, thus demonstrating how young readers start to self-reflect, seek information, and take action.

== Bibliography ==
=== Middle Grade novels ===
- Ninth Ward (2010)
- Sugar (2014)
- Bayou Magic (2015)
- Towers Falling (2016)
- Ghost Boys (2018)
- Black Brother, Black Brother (2020)
- Paradise on Fire (2021)
- Los Chicos Fantasmas (Ghost Boys Spanish Edition) (2022)
- Treasure Island: Runaway Gold (2023)
- Will's Race for Home (2025)
- Ghost Boys: The Graphic Novel (2025)

=== Picture Books ===
- Soul Step, co-written with Kelly McWilliams & illustrated by Briana Mukodiri Uchendu (2024)

=== Adult novels ===
- Voodoo Dreams (1993)
- Magic City (1997)
- Douglass' Women (2002)
- Season (Formerly Voodoo Season) (2005)
- Moon (Formerly Yellow Moon) (2008)
- Hurricane (2011)

=== Nonfiction ===
- Free Within Ourselves: Fiction Lessons for Black Authors (1999)
- The African American Guide to Writing and Publishing Non-Fiction (2001)
- Porch Stories: A Grandmother's Guide to Happiness (2006)

== Awards and honors ==
- 2003: American Book Award (Douglass' Women)
- 2003: Black Caucus of the American Library Award for Fiction (Douglass' Women)
- 2003: PEN Oakland/Josephine Miles Literary Award
- 2010: Parents' Choice Foundation Gold Award (Ninth Ward)
- 2011: Coretta Scott King Honor Award (Ninth Ward)
- 2014: Jane Addams Children's Book Award (Sugar)
- 2018: E.B. White Read Aloud Award (Ghost Boys)
- 2018: NAIBA Book of the Year (Ghost Boys)
- 2019: Walter Dean Myers Award for Outstanding Children’s Literature in the Young Readers category (Ghost Boys)
- 2020: New England Book Award, Top 10 Kids' Indie Next Pick (Black Brother, Black, Brother)
- 2021: Finalist, NAACP Image Award for Outstanding Literary Work for Youth/Teens (Black Brother, Black, Brother)
- 2022: Green Earth Book Award (Paradise on Fire)
- 2023: The Center for Black Literature Octavia E. Butler Award for Speculative Fiction and Fantasy
- 2025: Coretta Scott King Book Award (Will's Race for Home)
- 2025: Graphic Novels & Comics Round Table - Best Graphic Novels for Children Top Ten (Ghost Boys: The Graphic Novel)
- 2026: Eisner Award Nomination for Best Adaptation From Another Medium (Ghost Boys: The Graphic Novel)
