= The Climber (manga) =

Japanese manga series

- First tankōbon volume cover

孤高の人
- Genre: Adventure; Drama; Sports
- Created by: Jirō Nitta
- Manga
- Written by: Shin-ichi Sakamoto; Yoshio Nabeta (vol. 1 & 2); Hiroshi Takano (vol. 2–4)
- Illustrated by: Shin-ichi Sakamoto
- Published by: Shueisha
- English publisher: NA: Viz Media
- Imprint: Young Jump Comics
- Magazine: Weekly Young Jump
- Original run: 1 November 2007 – 27 October 2011
- Volumes: 17
- icon

The Climber (Japanese: 孤高の人, Hepburn: Kokō no Hito; lit. 'Solitary Person') is a Japanese manga series written by Shin-ichi Sakamoto, Yoshio Nabeta (first two volumes), and Hiroshi Takano (volumes 2–4), and illustrated by Sakamoto, based on a two-volume 1973 novel by Jirō Nitta. It was originally serialized in Shueisha's seinen manga magazine Weekly Young Jump from November 2007 to October 2011, with its chapters collected in 17 tankōbon volumes. It has been licensed for English release in North America by Viz Media.

The series tells the story of introverted solo mountain climber Mori Buntarō—partially based on real-life mountain climber Buntarō Katō—who is introduced to sport climbing after being transferred to a new high school and later dedicates his entire life to professional mountain climbing, with the ascent of K2's East Face as his ultimate goal.

In 2010, The Climber won an Excellence Prize at the 14th Japan Media Arts Festival.

== Synopsis ==
The story follows a lonesome and "gloomy" student named Buntarō Mori (森 文太郎, Mori Buntarō) and his journey from the discovery of his new passion, climbing, starting from a high school climbing club, to being a world class professional climber. Going through the different stages of his life dealing with loneliness, solo climbing, and depression, in pursuit of his dream, conquering the most difficult mountain, K2.

== Publication ==
Based on Jirō Nitta's two-volume 1973 novel, The Climber manga was written by Shin-ichi Sakamoto, Yoshio Nabeta (first two volumes), and Hiroshi Takano (volumes 2–4), and illustrated by Sakamoto. It was serialized in Shueisha's seinen manga magazine Weekly Young Jump from 1 November 2007 to 27 October 2011. Shueisha collected its chapters in seventeen tankōbon volumes, released from 18 April 2008 to 18 November 2011.

In May 2024, Viz Media announced that they licensed the series for English publication. The volumes are being released in an edition that combines two of the original Japanese volumes into one, with the first volume released on 15 April 2025.

=== Volumes ===
No.	Original release date	Original ISBN	English release date	English ISBN
1	18 April 2008	978-4-08-877426-8	15 April 2025	978-1-9747-5152-5
2	18 July 2008	978-4-08-877475-6	15 April 2025	978-1-9747-5152-5
3	19 September 2008	978-4-08-877522-7	15 July 2025	978-1-9747-5516-5
4	19 November 2008	978-4-08-877549-4	15 July 2025	978-1-9747-5516-5
5	19 February 2009	978-4-08-877593-7	21 October 2025	978-1-9747-5866-1
6	19 May 2009	978-4-08-877642-2	21 October 2025	978-1-9747-5866-1
7	19 August 2009	978-4-08-877696-5	20 January 2026	978-1-9747-6190-6
8	19 November 2009	978-4-08-877753-5	20 January 2026	978-1-9747-6190-6
9	19 February 2010	978-4-08-877807-5	21 April 2026	978-1-9747-6258-3
10	19 March 2010	978-4-08-877835-8	21 April 2026	978-1-9747-6258-3
11	18 June 2010	978-4-08-877880-8	21 July 2026	978-1-9747-6458-7
12	17 September 2010	978-4-08-879030-5	21 July 2026	978-1-9747-6458-7
13	17 December 2010	978-4-08-879077-0	20 October 2026	978-1-9747-6537-9
14	18 February 2011	978-4-08-879120-3	20 October 2026	978-1-9747-6537-9
15	19 May 2011	978-4-08-879145-6	19 January 2027	978-1-9747-6636-9
16	19 August 2011	978-4-08-879187-6	19 January 2027	978-1-9747-6636-9
17	19 November 2011	978-4-08-879236-1	19 January 2027	978-1-9747-6636-9

== Reception ==
The Climber won an Excellence Prize in the Manga Division at the 14th Japan Media Arts Festival in 2010. It also won the Best Seinen Manga category at the 2011 Prix Mangawa Awards. Viz Media's English release (Volumes 3–6) was nominated for Best Continuing Manga Series at the third American Manga Awards co-organized by Anime NYC and Japan Society in 2026.
