= Jirō Nitta =

Japanese writer

Jirō Nitta 新田 次郎
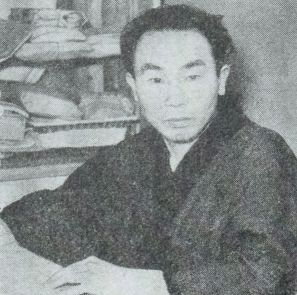
- Jirō c. 1956
- Born: Hiroto Fujiwara 藤原 寛人; June 6, 1912; Suwa, Nagano Prefecture, Japan
- Died: February 15, 1980 (aged 67); Musashino, Tokyo, Japan
- Occupation: Novelist
- Children: Masahiko Fujiwara (son)
- Relatives: Sakuhei Fujiwara (uncle)
- Writing career
- Notable awards: Naoki Prize; Medal with Purple Ribbon; Order of the Rising Sun, 4th class

Jirō Nitta (新田 次郎, Nitta Jirō; June 6, 1912 – February 15, 1980) is the pen name of Japanese historical novelist and meteorologist Hiroto Fujiwara (藤原 寛人, Fujiwara Hiroto). He was born in an area that is now part of the city of Suwa, Nagano Prefecture, Japan.

== Career ==
His uncle was the famed meteorologist Sakuhei Fujiwara and his son is mathematician Masahiko Fujiwara. After retiring from the Japan Meteorological Agency, he began writing professionally. Originally a meteorologist, he wrote mainly on themes connected with mountains.

At least three of his documentary novels have been translated into English. Death March on Mount Hakkōda (八甲田山死の彷徨, Hakkōdasan shi no hōkō) is based on an incident in 1902 in the Hakkōda Mountains. Alaskan Tale (アラスカ物語, Arasuka monogatari) is about the adventures of Frank Yasuda.

Phantom Immigrants (密航船水安丸, Mikōsen Suianmaru; lit. "Stowaway-ship Suianmaru"; translated by David Sulz) deals with the Meiji era entrepreneur, Jinzaburo Oikawa (及川 甚三郎, Oikawa Jinzaburō) from northern Miyagi prefecture, who went to Canada in 1896 to export salmon roe back to Japan. In 1906, he chartered the schooner Suianmaru to smuggle 82 fellow villagers out of Japan and into Canada. They were apprehended and arrested on Vancouver Island without passports but allowed to stay in Canada thanks to negotiations by Saburo Yoshie (吉江 三郎, Yoshie Saburō) (aka Fred Yoshy) of the Japanese consulate in Vancouver.

From 1963 to 1967, he was in charge of the project to construct Mount Fuji Radar System .

His 1973 two-volume novel Kokou no Hito (孤高の人) has been adapted into a manga series of the same title in which he is credited as writer.
