= Issho ni Kurashite Ii desu ka? =

Japanese manga series

- First tankōbon volume cover

一緒に暮らしていいですか？
- Genre: Romantic comedy
- Manga
- Written by: Kei Sasuga
- Published by: Shueisha
- Imprint: Young Jump Comics
- Magazine: Grand Jump Mucha; (February 21, 2023 – October 24, 2023); Grand Jump; (November 15, 2023 – present)
- Original run: February 21, 2023 – present
- Volumes: 9

Issho ni Kurashite Ii desu ka? (一緒に暮らしていいですか？; lit. "Can I Live With You?") is a Japanese manga series written and illustrated by Kei Sasuga. It was originally serialized in Shueisha's Grand Jump Mucha magazine from February to October 2023, before transferring to Grand Jump magazine in November of that year. Nine volumes have been published as of August 2026.

== Plot ==
The series follows Hiromi Sonoda, a 27-year old who was recently fired from his job then dumped by his girlfriend and kicked out of their shared apartment. Having no place to live, he checks out Cloris Condo, a share house that interested him owing to its low rent. However, he learns that the share house is intended for women, with his application being accepted as he was mistaken for being a woman due to his feminine name. Despite the circumstances, he decides to stay at the share house, wanting to experience the feeling of being loved by a family.

== Characters ==
Hiromi Sonoda (園田 寛美, Sonoda Hiromi)
A 27-year-old man who was recently fired from his job and dumped by his girlfriend. He was raised by his grandmother after his parents were killed in an accident when he was three years old. Due to his family circumstances, he dreamt of having a happy family life.
Lily Tanigawa (谷川 りり, Tanigawa Riri)
A 20-year old art student.
Mio Iwaki (岩木 美桜, Iwaki Mio)
A 19-year old idol.
Anju Ōe (大江 杏寿, Ōe Anju)
A 24-year old freeter.
Tsubaki Tanzawa (丹沢 椿咲, Tanzawa Tsubaki)
A 27-year old software engineer.
Yukari Kirishima (霧島 紫莉, Kirishima Yukari)
A 33-year old pole dancer.

== Publication ==
Issho ni Kurashite Ii desu ka? is written and illustrated by Kei Sasuga. It initially began serialization in Shueisha's Grand Jump Mucha magazine, where it ran from February to October 2023. The series transferred to Shueisha's Grand Jump magazine in November of that year. The series has been compiled into nine tankōbon volumes as of August 2026.

No.	Release date	ISBN
1	October 19, 2023	978-4-08-892871-5
2	February 19, 2024	978-4-08-893133-3
3	September 19, 2024	978-4-08-893389-4
4	March 18, 2025	978-4-08-893650-5
5	June 18, 2025	978-4-08-893705-2
6	September 19, 2025	978-4-08-893814-1
7	January 19, 2026	978-4-08-894070-0
8	April 17, 2026	978-4-08-894171-4
9	August 19, 2026	978-4-08-894318-3
10	December 17, 2026	978-4-08-894441-8

== See also ==
- Domestic Girlfriend, another manga series by the same author
- GE: Good Ending, another manga series by the same author
