= Quincey Morris =

Fictional character created by Bram Stoker

- Dracula character
- Art by Pablo Marcos
- First appearance: Dracula (1897)
- Last appearance: Dracula (2020)
- Created by: Bram Stoker

In-universe information
- Species: Human
- Gender: Male
- Nationality: American

Quincey P. Morris is a fictional character in Bram Stoker's 1897 gothic novel Dracula.

== In the novel ==
He is a rich young American from Texas, and one of the three men who propose to Lucy Westenra. Quincey is friends with her other two suitors, Arthur Holmwood and Dr. John Seward, even after Lucy has chosen Arthur, as well as Jonathan Harker who is to be married to Lucy's best friend Mina Harker. He carries a Bowie knife at all times, and at one point he admits that he is a teller of tall tales and "a rough fellow, who hasn't perhaps lived as a man should".

Quincey is the last person to donate his blood to Lucy before her death. Aside from Dracula, Quincey is the only major character not to keep some form of journal.

Quincey is one of the few characters in Dracula to have prior knowledge of blood drinkers. In chapter 12, he mentions that he was forced to shoot his horse while in the Pampas after vampire bats drank it dry during the night. Quincey plays an important role in the climax of the novel. He and Jonathan Harker are the ones who finally destroy Count Dracula. Quincey is gravely injured in the final battle with Count Dracula and his minions and dies shortly afterwards. In gratitude for his efforts, Harker and his wife, Mina Harker, name their son Quincey.

== In media ==
=== In literature ===
- In 1991, author P. N. Elrod wrote a short story called "The Wind Breathes Cold" which appeared in the anthology Dracula: Prince of Darkness (ISBN 0-88677-531-0). In the story, Morris, who had been killed in the process of destroying Dracula (who had fled back to Transylvania when his plans for establishing a residence in England failed), awakens in the night to discover that, as the result of an old affair with a woman who turned out to be a vampire, he himself has become a vampire. Dracula confronts him, explaining that they belong to what effectively amounts to two different species of vampires and that many of Dracula's weaknesses (crosses, garlic, and other anti-vampire paraphernalia) are the price for his additional powers. The story ends with Quincey returning to the castle with Dracula for a short time to adjust to what has happened to him. In 2001, Elrod expanded the chapter into a full novel (Baen Paperbacks, 2001, ISBN 978-0-671-31988-5) with Quincey leaving Transylvania and traveling first to Paris, then on to London in the hopes of convincing his friends that he's not the evil monster Van Helsing has painted him to be.
- In the graphic novel by Tony Lee, From The Pages Of Bram Stoker's Dracula: Harker, a sequel to Dracula set six months later, Quincey appears to Jonathan Harker as a ghost and, in the final battle fights the spirit form of Dracula himself, sacrificing his own soul to save Mina's child.

=== On screen ===
Most film adaptations of the novel omit Quincey altogether. In the 1977 adaptation Count Dracula, he is merged with the Arthur Holmwood character and renamed Quincey Holmwood. To date, Morris has been portrayed in film and television by:

- Jack Taylor in Count Dracula (1970)-here he is an Englishman and Lucy’s fiancé
- Richard Barnes (as Quincey Holmwood) in Count Dracula (1977)-here he is Lucy’s fiancé
- Billy Campbell in Bram Stoker's Dracula (1992) - he is portrayed faithfully to his counterpart in the novel.
- Alessio Boni in Dracula (2002) - here the events are updated to modern times and Quincey is a businessman specialising in money swindles.
- Keir Knight (as "Quincy Morris of Texas") in Dracula: Pages from a Virgin's Diary (2002)
- Anoop Shukkoor portrayed Quincey Morris in the 2005 Indian Malayalam-language television series, Dracula, which aired on Asianet.
- Krash Miller in Dracula Reborn (2012) - here the events take place in modern-day California and Quincey tries to destroy Dracula in revenge for killing Quincey's girlfriend Lucy.
- Phil Dunster in BBC's Dracula miniseries (2020) - here he is re-imagined as a modern day rich American and a boyfriend, then fiance, of Lucy Westenra. He doesn't seem to care much about Lucy herself, mostly cares about her looks, leaves right after her funeral and doesn't take any important part in the plot.
- Rebecca Quincy in Renfield (2023) is a reference to Quincey Morris, with her late father being named Morris Quincy.

=== On stage ===
- Quincey Morris appears in Dracula, the Musical by Frank Wildhorn. Here his portrayal is faithful to the novel. He was played by Bart Shatto in the Broadway production of the musical.

=== Games ===
In the Castlevania video game series, Quincey is a distant relative of the series' main heroes, the Belmonts. In addition, two games, Castlevania: Bloodlines and Portrait of Ruin, feature his son John and grandson Jonathan as their respective protagonists, in which they wield the Belmonts' family weapon, the Vampire Killer whip and are tasked with stopping Dracula's resurrection. How exactly Quincey had a son remains to be explained. Quincey is a hidden playable character alongside his two descendants in the "Ode to Castlevania" downloadable content for Vampire Survivors.

In the full motion video based game Dracula Unleashed, the protagonist is Quincey's brother Alexander Morris. The plot involves Alexander's investigation of his brother's death. Quincey also appears to Alexander in a dream sequence. Both brothers are played by Bill Williamson in the game.

=== Manga ===
In the 1997 Manga Hellsing, Quincy is shown during flashbacks of Hellsings iteration of Dracula. He is shown alongside other characters from the novel as an ally of Van Helsing against Count Dracula, later known as Alucard. He is seen succumbing to his injuries moments after putting a stake through Dracula's heart.

2021's #DRCL midnight children portrays Quincy as an African American child from Texas. With a loud and abrasive personality, he is a bully to Mina Murray.
