= DRCL midnight children =

Japanese manga series

- #DRCL midnight children
- First tankōbon volume cover
- Genre: Dark fantasy; Supernatural
- Manga
- Written by: Shin-ichi Sakamoto
- Published by: Shueisha
- English publisher: NA: Viz Media
- Magazine: Grand Jump
- Original run: January 20, 2021 – present
- Volumes: 7
- icon

#DRCL midnight children is a Japanese manga series written and illustrated by Shin-ichi Sakamoto. It is based on Bram Stoker's novel Dracula. It is being serialized monthly in Shueisha's Grand Jump, with its chapters collected in seven tankōbon volumes as of June 2026. #DRCL midnight children is a story set in 19th-century Britain that follows Mina Murray and her colleagues as they attempt to obtain victory against a foe from a far away land in the East.

== Characters ==
- Mina Murray, a ginger tomboy from Lancashire. She is adept at Catch as Catch Can wrestling, however Mina is the only girl in her school and is bullied by her male classmates for her academic and physical prowess.
- Luke / Lucy Westenra, an aloof and frail young man. At night he turns into Lucy who is best friends with Mina, however during the day he shows indifference to Mina.
- Arthur Holmwood, the leader of his group of friends. He is from nobility and views himself as a gallant knight but is secretly a coward.
- Joe Suwa, a Japanese photographer who helps in tormenting Mina. He is quite mysterious and the disturbed nun Renfield lives with him.
- Quincey Morris, an African American from Texas. He is the main instigator in bullying Mina and has a loud and abrasive personality.
- Abraham Van Helsing, a newly appointed professor to Whitby school. He has come from Holland to research Lucy's condition.
- Jonathan Harker, a small English boy with medium length blonde hair. The childhood best friend of Mina Murray. He utilizes a wheelchair as his sole means of conveyance after an incident that took his ability to walk.
- Count Dracula, an ancient vampire who was once the historical Vlad the Impaler. He is able to feed on pomegranates as a substitute for human blood, though doing so causes him to take on a childlike form.

== Publication ==
#DRCL midnight children, written and illustrated by Shin-ichi Sakamoto, is based on Bram Stoker's novel Dracula. The series was first published with a preview chapter in Shueisha's seinen manga magazine Grand Jump on December 2, 2020; it began its serialization in the magazine on January 20, 2021. Shueisha released the first tankōbon volume on February 18, 2022. As of April 17, 2026, seven volumes have been released.

In February 2023, Viz Media announced that it had licensed the manga for English publication.

=== Volumes ===
No.	Original release date	Original ISBN	English release date	English ISBN
1	February 18, 2022	978-4-08-792753-5	September 19, 2023	978-1-9747-4088-8
2	October 19, 2022	978-4-08-792771-9	March 19, 2024	978-1-9747-4313-1
3	June 19, 2023	978-4-08-792776-4	September 17, 2024	978-1-9747-4868-6
4	February 19, 2024	978-4-08-792782-5	March 25, 2025	978-1-9747-5203-4
5	November 19, 2024	978-4-08-792811-2	September 16, 2025	978-1-9747-5782-4
6	June 18, 2025	978-4-08-792815-0	July 21, 2026	978-1-9747-6322-1
7	April 17, 2026	978-4-08-792821-1	—	—

== Reception ==
In 2024, the series was nominated for the Eisner Awards in the Best Adaptation from Another Medium and Best U.S. Edition of International Material—Asia categories. It won the Japan Society and Anime NYC's first American Manga Awards in the Best New Manga category in 2024.
