= GE: Good Ending =

Japanese manga series

- First tankōbon volume cover, featuring Yuki Kurokawa

GE～グッドエンディング～ (Guddo Endingu)
- Genre: Romantic comedy
- Manga
- Written by: Kei Sasuga
- Published by: Kodansha
- English publisher: NA: Kodansha USA (digital)
- Magazine: Weekly Shōnen Magazine
- Original run: August 19, 2009 – January 9, 2013
- Volumes: 16

GE: Good Ending (Japanese: GE～グッドエンディング～, Hepburn: Guddo Endingu) is a Japanese manga series written and illustrated by Kei Sasuga. It was serialized in Kodansha's shōnen manga magazine Weekly Shōnen Magazine from August 2009 to January 2013, with its chapters collected in 16 tankōbon volumes. The manga has been licensed for English digital release in North America by Kodansha USA.

== Plot ==
Seiji Utsumi has a crush on schoolmate Shou Iketani, a cheerful, pretty and popular member of the tennis team. He is caught peeping at Shou by classmate Yuki Kurokawa, who gets Seiji to join the club and also coaches him on how to relate to Shou better. However, Seiji also grows to like Yuki, who is hesitant about being involved in any relationships.

== Characters ==
Seiji Utsumi (内海 聖志, Utsumi Seiji)
Yuki Kurokawa (黒川 雪, Kurokawa Yuki)
Shou Iketani (池谷 晶, Iketani Shō)

== Publication ==
Written and illustrated by Kei Sasuga, a pilot one-shot chapter was published in Kodansha's shōnen manga magazine Weekly Shōnen Magazine on April 8, 2009; it was later published as a serialized manga in the same magazine from August 19, 2009, until its conclusion on January 9, 2013. Kodansha collected its chapters in sixteen tankōbon volume, released from January 15, 2010, to February 15, 2013.

In November 2019, Kodansha USA announced that they had licensed the manga in English for a digital release under their Kodansha Comics imprint; the sixteen volumes were released from January 14, 2020, to April 13, 2021.

== Reception ==
The French edition of volume 1 received a 2/4 rating by Faustine Lillaz of planetebd.com. Volume 2 received a 1/4 rating.

== See also ==
- Domestic Girlfriend, another manga series by the author
- Issho ni Kurashite Ii desu ka?, another manga series by the same author
