= Watashi no Ecchina Rirekisho Mite Kudasai =

Japanese manga series

- First tankōbon volume cover

私のHな履歴書みてください
- Manga
- Written by: Haruki
- Published by: Shueisha
- Imprint: Young Jump Comics
- Magazine: Grand Jump Premium; (December 27, 2017 – October 31, 2018); Grand Jump Mecha; (May 30, 2018 – present); Grand Jump Mucha; (December 26, 2018 – present)
- Original run: December 27, 2017 – present
- Volumes: 14

Watashi no Ecchina Rirekisho Mite Kudasai (私のHな履歴書みてください) is a Japanese manga series written and illustrated by Haruki. It was originally a one-shot published in Shueisha's Grand Jump Premium magazine in August 2017. It later began serialization in the same magazine in December that same year.

== Synopsis ==
The series is centered around the sexual experiences of several different women.

== Publication ==
Written and illustrated by Haruki, Watashi no Ecchina Rirekisho Mita Kudasai was originally published as a one-shot in Shueisha's Grand Jump Premium magazine on August 23, 2017. Another one-shot was later released in the 1st issue of the then newly-formed Grand Jump Mecha magazine on November 29, 2017. It later began serialization in the Grand Jump Premium magazine on December 27, 2017. It also began serialization in the Grand Jump Mecha magazine on May 30, 2018. It was later transferred to the then newly-formed Grand Jump Mucha magazine on December 26, 2018. Its chapters have been collected into fourteen tankōbon volumes as of May 2026.

No.	Release date	ISBN
1	June 19, 2018	978-4-08-891055-0
2	January 18, 2019	978-4-08-891183-0
3	July 19, 2019	978-4-08-891331-5
4	March 19, 2020	978-4-08-891517-3
5	September 18, 2020	978-4-08-891660-6
6	April 19, 2021	978-4-08-891848-8
7	November 19, 2021	978-4-08-892149-5
8	September 16, 2022	978-4-08-892411-3
9	June 19, 2023	978-4-08-892724-4
10	January 18, 2024	978-4-08-893079-4
11	September 19, 2024	978-4-08-893394-8
12	April 17, 2025	978-4-08-893684-0
13	October 17, 2025	978-4-08-893865-3
14	May 19, 2026	978-4-08-894172-1

== Reception ==
By September 2023, the series had over 1.1 million copies in circulation.

== See also ==
- Ero Ninja Scrolls, another manga series by the same creator
- Kisei Jūi Suzune, another manga series by the same creator
