= Shin-ichi Sakamoto =

Japanese manga artist (born 1972)

- Born: July 19, 1972 (age 54); Osaka Prefecture, Japan
- Occupation: Manga artist
- Years active: 1990–present
- Notable work: The Climber, Innocent

Shin-ichi Sakamoto (Japanese: 坂本眞一, Hepburn: Sakamoto Shin-ichi; born July 19, 1972) is a Japanese manga artist known for his seinen manga series The Climber and the Innocent duology. Both The Climber and Innocent were awarded an Excellence Award at the Japan Media Arts Festival. His newest series #DRCL midnight children began serialization in Grand Jump in 2021.

== Life and career ==
Shin-ichi Sakamoto was born in Osaka Prefecture in 1972 as the middle child of three brothers. He loved drawing and even won some contests as a child. However, he did not read manga until he found a copy of Weekly Shōnen Jump in a parking lot and saw Fist of the North Star and then Kinnikuman. Falling in love with manga, he decided to become a manga artist in high school. He made his debut in 1990 at the age of 18 with the one-shot "Keith!!", which won a contest. He began his first serialization in 1995, but Sakamoto himself said he spent the next 10 years without doing "anything of importance". This changed in 2007, when he created The Climber based on the novel of the same name. Sakamoto said that previously, he only focused on imagery and stories he thought would sell well. But with The Climber, he put his self, lifestyle, and thought process into his work. Sakamoto owns many pamphlets, books, and magazines regarding clothes worn in the French Revolution. The material is used for manga, such as Innocent and Innocent Rouge. Due to the many lives lost in his manga, Sakamoto goes to a shrine to pay his respects each time. He states that if it were not for this, then he would not be able to deal with his work.

On July 6, 2025, Sakamoto announced a solo art exhibition to commemorate his 35th anniversary as a manga artist. Titled "Shin-ichi Sakamoto Chronicle: Present", it was held at the Vanilla Gallery in Ginza, from September 6 through September 28. The exhibition was themed after his then-current work, #DRCL: Midnight Children, with over 106 manuscripts and storyboards up for display, along with costumes and cameras owned by Sakamoto.

== Style ==
Sakamoto is a self-taught artist. Tetsuo Hara, the illustrator of Fist of the North Star, had a huge influence on him. Sakamoto's early art style focused on muscles and was paired with stories focused on men fighting. He solidified his current style with The Climber, which he called a big turning point for himself. The artist said that as a novel, the original work uses metaphors to create imagery, and he decided to show these in his manga adaptation. Examples of his symbolic imagery style include letters of the text in The Climber being mirrored to convey a character's panic from losing oxygen, and public outcry from a public execution in Innocent Rouge being depicted as a tsunami. Sakamoto said he does not plan these in advance and, because his career struggled for so long, he will go with them as long as he finds it interesting because he is ready for his career to end at any moment. He went digital around 2012, citing the possibility of the paper he used being discontinued or his favorite pen stopping working like it used to as the reasons. Sakamoto is known for his detailed and realistic images. When Naoki Urasawa suggested that his work is known for the characters' lips, the artist explained that he draws them as if they are interior organs.

After drawing the names on paper, Sakamoto's manga is created completely digitally. The artist takes photographs of his assistants modeling clothing and costumes, some of which he sews himself, in poses that he wants the characters in. He draws using an LCD tablet and has multiple layers to an image that he can add or remove at will; a background created by an assistant, a pre-made outline of the character, a photo of his assistant posing that is cropped and resized to fit the character outline, and a draft he draws on top. Drawing with his right hand, Sakamoto uses a remote in his left to move, rotate or flip images. After finishing the draft, he "inks" the final version using the G Pen setting because it is the thinnest. Sakamoto can not only immediately undo a line he does not like, but can select a specific part of the image, such as an eye, and reposition it. He cited this as one of the reasons he can not go back to traditional ink on paper. The clothes and hair of characters are kept on their own layers. Sakamoto meticulously traces the details of clothing from the photos he takes, and has a digital library of over 2,000 hairstyles he created that he picks pieces from.

== Works ==
=== Manga ===
- Bloody Soldier (ブラッディ・ソルジャー) (1995)
- Mortal Commando Guy (モートゥル・コマンドーGUY) (1995)
- Niragi Kioumaru (にらぎ鬼王丸) (April 19, 2004 – November 18, 2005)
- Masuraou (益荒王) (2005–2006)
- The Climber (孤高の人, Kokō no Hito; lit. Lonely Person) (2007–2012)
- Innocent (イノサン) (January 31, 2013 – April 16, 2015)
- Innocent Rouge (イノサン ルージュ) (May 20, 2015 – January 8, 2020)
- #DRCL midnight children (January 20, 2021 – present)

=== Other ===
- Innocent Bleu (イノサン ブルー) (2020, Artbook)
- Dorachuu (どらちゅう) (2020, one-shot doujinshi)
- Devil's Door (デベルズドア) (2021, Cover art)

== Awards ==
- 2010 (14th) Japan Media Arts Festival, Excellence Prize for Manga (for The Climber)
- 2011 Prix Mangawa Awards, Best Seinen Manga (for The Climber)
- 2013 (17th) Japan Media Arts Festival, Jury Selection for Manga (for Innocent)
- 2014 (18th) Tezuka Osamu Cultural Prize, Reader Award Nomination (for Innocent)
- 2015 (8th) Manga Taishō, Nomination (for Innocent)
- 2021 (24th) Japan Media Arts Festival, Excellence Award for Manga (for Innocent Rouge)
