= Domestic Girlfriend =

Japanese manga and anime series

- Manga volume 1, featuring Hina Tachibana (left) and Natsuo Fujii (right)

ドメスティックな彼女 (Domesutikku na Kanojo)
- Genre: Romance
- Manga
- Written by: Kei Sasuga
- Published by: Kodansha
- English publisher: NA: Kodansha USA
- Imprint: Shōnen Magazine Comics
- Magazine: Weekly Shōnen Magazine
- Original run: April 23, 2014 – June 10, 2020
- Volumes: 28 + extra
- Anime television series
- Directed by: Shōta Ihata
- Produced by: Toshihiro Maeda; Youhei Itou; Hiroyuki Aoi; Makoto Nishibe; Airi Sawada
- Written by: Tatsuya Takahashi
- Music by: Masato Kōda
- Studio: Diomedéa
- Licensed by: Sentai Filmworks
- Original network: MBS, TBS, BS-TBS, AT-X, ATV
- Original run: January 12, 2019 – March 30, 2019
- Episodes: 12
- icon

Domestic Girlfriend (Japanese: ドメスティックな彼女, Hepburn: Domesutikku na Kanojo) is a Japanese manga series written and illustrated by Kei Sasuga. It was serialized in Kodansha's Weekly Shōnen Magazine from April 2014 to June 2020, with its chapters collected in 28 tankōbon volumes. The manga was published digitally in English by Kodansha USA. An anime television series adaptation produced by Diomedéa was broadcast from January to March 2019 on the MBS's Animeism block. Sentai Filmworks has licensed the series in North America and other countries.

== Synopsis ==
=== Premise ===
Natsuo Fujii is hopelessly in love with his teacher, Hina Tachibana. Trying to move on, he agrees to a mixer. There he meets an odd girl, Rui, who invites him to sneak out. She takes him to her house and asks him to have sex with her. Natsuo, frustrated that his love will not bear fruit anyway, loses his virginity to her. The next day, Natsuo's dad tells him that he wants to remarry and his prospective partner is coming to their house that evening. As the door swings open, Natsuo is taken aback to discover that Tsukiko Tachibana, the woman his father plans to marry, has two daughters: his longtime crush, Hina, and her younger sister, Rui.

=== Setting ===
Domestic Girlfriend tells the story of Natsuo and his forbidden love towards his first love, who is forced to break up when discovered. In the void left, Natsuo embarks on a new romantic journey with his stepsister, the girl he lost his virginity to. The story delves into the controversial and complex issues of romantic relationships that involve student-teacher dynamics and step-sibling bonds, while also highlighting the themes of youth, family, friendships, learning, growing up, career, happiness, and trust.

== Characters ==
Natsuo Fujii (藤井 夏生, Fujii Natsuo)
Voiced by: Taku Yashiro (Japanese); Austin Tindle, Bryson Baugus (young) (English)
Natsuo, a 17-year-old high school student, harbors aspirations of becoming a novelist. However, he guards his creative talents as a well-kept secret, concealed from his friends and classmates. During his lunch breaks, he often retreats to the rooftop to nurture his passion for writing. It's on this rooftop that he crosses paths with Hina Tachibana, a new English teacher at the school. She becomes his source of inspiration for him, and he falls deeply in love with her. However, their relationship is exposed, and Hina is forced to end it. In his desolation, Natsuo discovers solace in his classmate and stepsister, Rui Tachibana.
Hina Tachibana (橘 陽菜, Tachibana Hina)
Voiced by: Yoko Hikasa (Japanese); Patricia Duran (English)
Hina is the high school English teacher of Natsuo, who meets her for the first time at the school's rooftop, a place she frequented to find solace when dealing with her own inner conflicts. Hina becomes a source for inspiration for Natsuo, who develops a deep crush on her. However, Hina also becomes Natsuo's stepsister after her mother remarries with Natsuo's father.
Rui Tachibana (橘 瑠衣, Tachibana Rui)
Voiced by: Maaya Uchida (Japanese); Natalie Rial (English)
Rui is a high school student who eventually develops feelings for Natsuo. She initially met him on an outing with friends, where they snuck out and both lost their virginities with one another, to unexpectedly become his stepsister after her mother remarries.
Momo Kashiwabara (柏原 もも, Kashiwabara Momo)
Voiced by: Haruka Yoshimura (Japanese); Hilary Haag (English)
Momo is a classmate of Rui and Natsuo. She is infamous for being flirtatious and sexually promiscuous (when asked, she estimates she hooked-up with over 30 boys, including one of Natsuo's friends), aside from her hobby of making weird plush dolls. She befriends Rui, who was warned not to deal with her and later sets her sights on Natsuo. She is from a broken family and attempted suicide once. Despite her appearance, she is revealed to be quite smart as she landed in the Top Ten during school exams.
Miu Ashihara (葦原 美雨, Ashihara Miu)
Voiced by: Konomi Kohara (Japanese); Luci Christian (English)
Miu is the sole member of the school's Literature Club until the arrival of Natsuo, Rui, and Momo. She is portrayed as a shy and soft-spoken girl with a sense of strictness when they are in the library. She has a crush on her Japanese teacher Kiriya at high school, but she is too shy to confess her feelings to him.
Akihito Fujii (藤井 昭人, Fujii Akihito)
Voiced by: Nobuo Tobita (Japanese); Mark X. Laskowski (English)
He is the father of Natsuo. He began to date Tokiko Tachibana, knowing his wife died 10 years ago. He becomes stepfather of Hina and Rui after marrying her.
Tokiko Tachibana (橘 都樹子, Tachibana Tokiko)
Voiced by: Yurika Hino (Japanese); Carli Mosier (English)
She is the mother of Hina and Rui. She began to date Akihito Fujii after her husband left her, ostensibly for another woman. She becomes Natsuo's step mother after marrying him.
Fumiya Kurimoto (栗本 文哉, Kurimoto Fumiya)
Voiced by: Takuya Eguchi (Japanese); Andrew Love (English)
He is Natsuo's best friend and adviser. He works part-time at a bar.
Yuya Masaoka (柾岡 悠弥, Masaoka Yūya)
Voiced by: Takeaki Masuyama (Japanese); Courtland Johnson (English)
He is one of Natsuo's friends at school.
Kazushi Kine (木根 和志, Kine Kazushi)
Voiced by: Gakuto Kajiwara (Japanese); Mike Haimoto (English)
He is one of Natsuo's friends at school.
Reiji Kiriya (桐谷 怜士, Kiriya Reiji)
Voiced by: Hikaru Midorikawa (Japanese); David Wald (English)
A famous author who publishes under the pseudonym You Hasukawa. He also serves as the school's literature club advisor.
Shu Hagiwara (萩原 柊, Hagiwara Shū)
Voiced by: Daisuke Hirakawa (Japanese); Adam Gibbs (English)
Shu Hagiwara, a married 32 years old man, who is a researcher at a Biology lab at a university.
Masaki Kobayashi (小林 昌樹, Kobayashi Masaki)
Voiced by: Kenjiro Tsuda (Japanese); John Gremillion (English)
Masaki Kobayashi is a current bartender and owner of the cafe Fumiya Kurimoto works at and that Natsuo, Rui and Hina frequently visit. In the past, he was a rising star of the Yakuza and son of the head of a Yakuza branch. Sometime after falling in love with another Yakuza male of a rival branch, he would leave the Yakuza behind him in order to pursue happiness through his homosexual lifestyle.
Kobayashi also acts as a counselor and adviser to his more favorite customers such as Fujii Natsuo and is always willing to help him and others, especially when it comes to love. He has a soft spot for cute males and makes no attempt to hide his desires for those he likes. Kobayashi also dresses brazenly in keeping for any event he attends, although he wears stockings while attending his cafe.
He has a good friendship, both drinking and social, with Hina, who confides in him her love for Natsuo and her dedication of her life to making Natsuo happy regardless if he loves her back or not, and offers support to Hina when she needs it.
Alex J. Matsukawa (松川・J・アレックス, Matsukawa Jei Arekkusu)
Voiced by: Tasuku Hatanaka (Japanese); Blake Shepard (English)
Alex is a high school student who is a member of the Literature Club. He is of American descent. He has a crush on Rui.

== Media ==
=== Manga ===
Written and illustrated by Kei Sasuga, Domestic Girlfriend was serialized in Kodansha's Weekly Shōnen Magazine from April 23, 2014, to June 10, 2020. Kodansha collected its 276 individual chapters in 28 tankōbon volumes, released from July 17, 2014, to August 17, 2020. An extra volume was published alongside the last volume.

In North America, the manga was licensed for English digital release by Kodansha USA in 2017.

=== Web video ===
A web video was released in May 2016 on YouTube, coinciding with the publication of the manga's ninth volume. Meant to be a "demo type love simulation drama", the video allowed the viewer to interactively influence the story by choosing between clicking two annotations that lead to separate videos. The video starred Anna Konno as Hina and Hanami Natsume as Rui.

=== Anime ===
An anime television series adaptation was announced on July 12, 2018. The series is directed by Shōta Ihata and written by Tatsuya Takahashi, with animation by studio Diomedéa. Naomi Ide provides the series' character designs. The anime aired from January 12 to March 30, 2019, (Note: Domestic Girlfriend premiered on January 11, 2019 at 25:55 (01:55 a.m.), effectively January 12, 2019.) and was broadcast on the Animeism programming block on MBS, TBS, and BS-TBS. The opening theme is "Kawaki wo Ameku" (カワキヲアメク) by Minami, and the ending theme is "Wagamama" (わがまま) by Alisa Takigawa. The series simulcast in Australia and New Zealand on AnimeLab. Sentai Filmworks acquired the distribution rights for the series in North America, the UK & Ireland, Australasia, South Africa, and other territories, and simulcast the series on select platforms. Hidive announced that they will produce an English dub of the anime series. MVM Entertainment have acquired the distribution rights via Sentai Filmworks for the United Kingdom and Ireland.

==== Episodes ====
No.	Title (Note: All English titles are taken from Hidive.)	Original release date
1	"Will You Do It With Me, Here?"; Transliteration: "Koko de atashi to, shite kunnai?" (Japanese: ここであたしと、してくんない？)	January 12, 2019 (Note: Domestic Girlfriend premiered on January 11, 2019, at 25:55 (01:55 am), effectively January 12.)
High schooler Natsuo is in love with his teacher, Hina. Trying to get past his feelings, Natsuo goes on a group date with his friends and meets a quiet girl named Rui Tachibana. Uninterested in the event, the two sneak out. She takes Natsuo to her house and then asks him to have sex with her, although she is not romantically interested in him. Afterwards, his widower father tells Natsuo that he is going to remarry, and Natsuo finds that his new stepsisters are Hina and Rui. Following the marriage, they move into a new house together. As everyone is going to bed, Natsuo tries to kiss a sleeping Hina but is interrupted by Rui.
2	"By Any Chance, Did We Do It?"; Transliteration: "Moshi ka shite, shichatta?" (Japanese: もしかして、しちゃった？)	January 19, 2019
Rui drags Hina to her bedroom after seeing Natsuo try to kiss her. The next day, Natsuo finds that Rui has transferred to his school; they decide to act like strangers. Natsuo observes Hina crying on school roof. During lunch, Natsuo helps Rui make friends by staging an argument which allows their classmates to see Rui's personality. Later at home, Natsuo tries to get a reluctant Hina to open up about her boyfriend, but they are interrupted.
3	"Is It True, After All?"; Transliteration: "Yappari, honto nan desu ka?" (Japanese: やっぱり、ホントなんですか？)	January 26, 2019
Natsuo is upset about Hina's relationship with her boyfriend, and is encouraged by his best friend Fumiya. He asks Hina to break up with her boyfriend, but ends up kissing her. Hina slaps his face, then returns the kiss and pushes him onto her bed. After seeing the shock in his eyes, she tells him that he is still a child and should not interfere in her life. The next day, Natsuo leaves the house to stay with Fumiya, upsetting the household. Rui meets him at Fumiya's house and, after discussing how to break up Hina's relationship, they return home.
4	"And... What About You?"; Transliteration: "Dōnano, kimi wa?" (Japanese: どうなの、君は？)	February 2, 2019
Natsuo and Rui stalk Hina, but have no luck finding her boyfriend. They steal Hina's phone, planning for Rui to impersonate Hina and break up, but she is too nervous to speak to the stranger. While they discuss their next move at the restaurant where Fumiya works, Hina and her boyfriend Shuu enter. Natsuo argues with Shuu until Rui throws water in Shuu's face and runs away. Natsuo follows her, and later Hina tells Shuu that they should avoid each other for a while. The next day, Natsuo visits his mother's grave. Rui and Hina follow him, with Hina stating that her relationship is over. They then pray at the grave together, introducing themselves as Natsuo's new sisters.
5	"Is It Okay... If I Fall for Him?"; Transliteration: "Suki ni natte mo Ii?" (Japanese: 好きになってもいい？)	February 9, 2019
Rui befriends Momo Kashiwabara, who has a reputation for dating numerous boys. They meet Natsuo while shopping, and he saves Momo from being struck by a bicyclist. Momo later asks Rui is she can fall for him. Momo flirts with Natsuo at school but he returns home to take care of Rui, who said she was sick, and Rui reveals that Momo has a crush on him. The next day at lunchtime, Momo kisses Natsuo on the cheek to cheer him up. Later, Momo invites him to her house where they make out in her room. He sees scars on her wrist, which she tells him to ignore. Natsuo cooks yaki udon for her, telling her that she can call him whenever she is lonely. She begins to cry, telling him how none of the boys that she dated treated her like he does. She asks him if they are dating, but he answers that maybe neither of them should date people they are emotionally dependent upon.
6	"Right Here And Now, Try To Kiss"; Transliteration: "Ima koko de kisu shite minasai" (Japanese: 今ここでキスしてみなさい)	February 16, 2019
Rui asks Natsuo to help her find a club. They come across the Literature Club, where Natsuo takes a book by his favorite author, You Hasukawa, though Rui warns him about theft. When returning it the following day, he is caught by teacher Reiji Kiriya who threatens to report him if he doesn't join the club. When Kiriya learns that Natsuo and Miu Ashihara, the club's only other member, both like romance novels, he tries to get them to kiss; Natsuo stops after seeing tears well up in Ashihara's eyes. The next day, they begin passing notes in the library, forming a friendship. Momo and Rui later join the club. On the weekend, Hina asks Natsuo if they can go out.
7	"This Is What It Means To Go Out Together, You Know?"; Transliteration: "Tsukiautte, kō yū koto da yo" (Japanese: 付き合うって、こういうことだよ)	February 23, 2019
Natsuo and Hina are mistaken for a couple at a restaurant. They talk at a beach, Natsuo being curious about why she had the affair with Shuu; a flashback shows Hina's high school days with him. Natsuo tells Hina that he has finished his novel, and confesses his love for her. He is surprised when she asks if they can go out; she wades into the water with him, explaining that it would be like committing double suicide because they would lose everything. They return home and Hina reads Natsuo's novel. The following night, Natsuo peeks into Hina's room and sees her masturbating while calling Shuu's name. He drops a book and hides behind the stairs when she looks for what caused the noise. The next morning, Hina greets Natsuo and says that he should wake up a little early; she waves to him as she leaves; looking at her hand, Natsuo feels embarrassed.
8	"Then I Don't Have To Be An Adult"; Transliteration: "Otona janakute īdesu" (Japanese: 大人じゃなくていいです)	March 2, 2019
Natsuo and schoolmate Alex catch a thief who stole Rui's underwear. Alex becomes interested in Rui but when Natsuo introduces them, Rui storms out. Natsuo cooks for Rui to apologize, which she accepts by having him kiss her. Hina sees this and becomes upset, and Rui tells Hina her true feelings. Hina decides to move out. On a family outing to a shrine, Natsuo tries to talk to Hina; she initially tries to avoid him but then confesses her true feelings and how she couldn't hold back if she stayed. They hold hands as they walk home.
9	"Don't Say That, Please?"; Transliteration: "Sonna koto, iwanaide?" (Japanese: そんなこと、言わないで？)	March 9, 2019
Rui meets Shuu at a bookstore; he treats her to a meal to apologize for the trouble he caused, and explains that he is now divorced but would feel selfish to reconcile with Hina. Hina moves out but leaves Natsuo a key to her apartment. Later, Rui finds Natsuo staring out the window in Hina's old room and hugs him. Natsuo goes to Hina's apartment and watches her sleep; she wakes up and he tells her that he is willing to die with her. They kiss, but Hina stops him when he tries to go further, saying that they shouldn't rush things. The next day at school, she confesses that she feels the same way and they kiss.
10	"Liar..."; Transliteration: "Usotsuki..." (Japanese: うそつき......っ)	March 16, 2019
Natsuo regularly visits Hina's apartment as their relationship progresses. The Literature Club members go to visit absent teacher Kiriya, and at his apartment learn that their club supervisor is novelist You Hasukawa, one of Natsuo's idols. Natsuo breaks his leg and Rui cares for him, including bathing him, but he lies to her about his secret visits to Hina. After being put out by his lies, Rui reads Natsuo's novel and realizes that he is in love with Hina. She confronts him at Hina's apartment and flees when she sees them together. Natsuo finds her, resolving to tell her everything.
11	"Are you sure?" Transliteration: "Honto ni īno?" (Japanese: ホントにいいの？)	March 23, 2019
Natsuo tells Rui about his relationship with Hina, and Rui decides to shun them while not at home. Rui confronts Hina, who apologizes for her relationship with Natsuo and offers to break up; understanding Hina's feelings, Rui stops her and the sisters reconcile. The second-year students go on a beach vacation to Okinawa, where Natsuo buys a souvenir ring for Hina. When he sneaks into her hotel room to give it to her, she tries to break up with him; Natsuo objects and puts the ring on her finger. They watch a fireworks display from her window and Natsuo asks Hina to marry him in the future, calling her by her name for the first time. They have sex and discuss their feelings. Returning to the school, Hina is summoned by the principal and shown a picture of her kissing Natsuo at the hotel window.
12	"I'm sorry. I love you." Transliteration: "Gomen ne. Aishiteru" (Japanese: ごめんね。愛してる)	March 30, 2019
The principal confronts Hina over her relationship with Natsuo. Hina announces that she is being transferred to a distant school. Natsuo and Rui are unable to contact Hina; a letter in Hina's empty apartment explains to Natsuo that she requested the transfer in exchange for the school's silence, and to help Natsuo move on. Natsuo falls into a depression, until members of the Literature Club encourage him and he pours his heart into a new novel. On New Year's Day, Natsuo and the club take it to Kiriya. Later, Natsuo is 'abducted' to a ceremony where his novel, entered into a contest by Kiriya, has won first prize. Natsuo returns home and is surprised when he thinks he sees Hina, rushing to hug her and tell her the news; it is actually Rui in a wig, and she rushes to her room in tears. Natsuo and Rui discuss his feelings for Hina, and he admits to having sex with her. Rui then kisses Natsuo and says she won't hold back any more. Elsewhere, two schoolgirls discuss Hina's hair, which is now short. Hina looks to the distance and smiles as the resolution in Natsuo's second novel, entitled "Well, See You".

== Reception ==
By April 2020, the manga had over three million copies in circulation. The first volume was reviewed in Anime News Network by three reviewers. Nik Freeman felt that the manga's stepsibling love triangle was a contrivance and that the sexual elements were a waste of Sasuga's talents, but complimented the drama and comedy, along with the characterization. Rebecca Silverman called the manga's setup a more mature Marmalade Boy, but said that the manga is less melodramatic due to Natsuo being more grounded and sensitive. Amy McNulty noted the manga's extra layers of reality and melodrama, finding Hina to be a multifaceted character and Rui to be the most relatable character while Natsuo is still realistic, concluding that the manga has a more honest setup of its tropes.

== See also ==
- GE: Good Ending, another manga series by the same author
- Issho ni Kurashite Ii desu ka?, another manga series by the same author
