= Masahiko Fujiwara =

Japanese mathematician

- 藤原 正彦
- Born: July 9, 1943 (age 82); Shinkyo, Manchukuo
- Education: University of Tokyo
- Known for: Essayist
- Scientific career
- Fields: Mathematics
- Institutions: Ochanomizu University; University of Colorado

Masahiko Fujiwara (Japanese: 藤原 正彦, romanized: Fujiwara Masahiko; born July 9, 1943, in Shinkyo, Manchukuo) is a Japanese mathematician and writer who is known for his book The Dignity of the Nation. He is a professor emeritus at Ochanomizu University.

== Life ==
Masahiko Fujiwara is the son of Jirō Nitta and Tei Fujiwara, who were both authors. He graduated from the University of Tokyo in 1966.

== Biography ==
Masahiko Fujiwara began writing after a two-year position as associate professor at the University of Colorado, with a book Wakaki sugakusha no Amerika designed to explain American campus life to Japanese people. He also wrote about the University of Cambridge, after a year's visit (Harukanaru Kenburijji: Ichi sugakusha no Igirisu). In a popular book on mathematics, he categorized theorems as beautiful theorems or ugly theorems. He is also known in Japan for speaking out against government reforms in secondary education. He wrote The Dignity of the Nation, which according to Time Asia was the second best selling book in the first six months of 2006 in Japan.

In 2006, Fujiwara published Yo ni mo utsukushii sugaku nyumon ("An Introduction to the World's Most Elegant Mathematics") with the writer Yōko Ogawa: it is a dialogue between novelist and mathematician on the extraordinary beauty of numbers.
