= Roku's House of Oddities =

Japanese manga series

- First tankōbon volume cover

ロクのおかしな家 (Roku no Okashina Ie)
- Genre: Comedy horror
- Manga
- Written by: Atsushi Nakamura
- Published by: Shueisha
- English publisher: NA: Viz Media
- Imprint: Jump Comics
- Magazine: Weekly Shōnen Jump
- Original run: April 6, 2026 – present
- Volumes: 2

Roku's House of Oddities (Japanese: ロクのおかしな家, Hepburn: Roku no Okashina Ie) is a Japanese manga series written and illustrated by Atsushi Nakamura. It began serialization in Shueisha's shōnen manga magazine Weekly Shōnen Jump in April 2026.

== Synopsis ==
Seiroku Akari is a member of his school's science club who doesn't believe in urban legends and goes out of his way to debunk them. One day he learns of The Moonlit Tales of Kokubunji, a collection of stories about curses and the rituals associated with them, and attempts the rituals in a period of five days in order to prove their non-existence. However, Roku ends up being cursed by five ghosts associated with the stories.

== Publication ==
Written and illustrated by Atsushi Nakamura, Roku's House of Oddities began serialization in Shueisha's shōnen manga magazine Weekly Shōnen Jump on April 6, 2026. Its chapters have been compiled into two tankōbon volumes as of November 2026.

The series' chapters are simultaneously published in English on Viz Media's Shonen Jump app and Shueisha's Manga Plus app.

No.	Original release date	Original ISBN	North American release date	North American ISBN
1	September 4, 2026	978-4-08-885229-4	—	—
2	November 4, 2026	978-4-08-885285-0	—	—

== Reception ==
The first volume received a recommendation from manga artist Yusuke Nomura.

The series was ranked ninth in the print category at the twelfth Next Manga Awards in 2026.

== See also ==
- Agravity Boys, another manga series by Atsushi Nakamura
