= List of Sakamoto Days chapters =

Sakamoto Days is a Japanese manga series written and illustrated by Yuto Suzuki. Suzuki first published a one-shot titled Sakamoto (SAKAMOTO-サカモト-) in Shueisha's Jump Giga on December 26, 2019. Sakamoto Days debuted in Shueisha's shōnen manga magazine Weekly Shōnen Jump on November 21, 2020. Shueisha has collected its chapters into individual tankōbon volumes. The first volume was released on April 2, 2021. As of November 4, 2026, 29 volumes have been released.

The series is simulpublished in English by Viz Media and the Manga Plus online platform. Viz Media started releasing the volumes in print on April 5, 2022.

A spin-off manga by Tetsu Ōkawa, who has worked as an assistant on the main manga, titled Sakamoto Holidays, started in Shueisha's magazine Saikyō Jump on July 4, 2024. The first tankōbon volume was released on January 4, 2025.

== Sakamoto Days ==
=== Volumes ===
No.	Original release date	Original ISBN	English release date	English ISBN
1	April 2, 2021	978-4-08-882657-8	April 5, 2022	978-1-9747-2894-7
Days 1: "The Legendary Hit Man" (伝説の殺し屋, Densetsu no Koroshiya); Days 2: "Sakamoto Family Rules" (坂本家家訓, Sakamoto Kekakun); Days 3: "Officer Nakase and the Mysterious Hero" (ナカセ巡査と謎のヒーロー, Nakase-junsa to Nazo no Hīrō); Days 4: "China Invasion!" (チャイナ襲来！, Chaina Shūrai!); Days 5: "Vs. Son Hee and Bacho" (VSソンヒ・バチョウ, Buiesu Sonhi Bachō); Days 6: "Nagumo" (ナグモ, Nagumo); Days 7: "Welcome to Sugar Park!" (シュガーパークへようこそ！, Shugāpāku e Yōkoso!)
2	June 4, 2021	978-4-08-882685-1	June 14, 2022	978-1-9747-3214-2
Days 8: "Showtime" (ショータイム, Shōtaimu); Days 9: "Boiled and Obiguro" (ボイルと帯黒, Boiru to Obiguro); Days 10: "Hard-Boiled" (ハードボイルド, Hādo Boirudo); Days 11: "Sakamoto vs. Boiled" (坂本VSボイル, Sakamoto Buiesu Boiru); Days 12: "Source of Strength" (強さの理由, Tsuyosa no Wake); Days 13: "Video Rental" (レンタルビデオ, Rentaru Bideo); Days 14: "Stealth Mission" (スニーキングミッション, Sunīkingu Misshon); Days 15: "Initiation" (始動, Shidō); Days 16: "Department Store War" (デパート戦せん争, Depāto Sensō)
3	September 3, 2021	978-4-08-882763-6	August 9, 2022	978-1-9747-3219-7
Days 17: "Heisuke Mashimo" (マシモ ヘイスケ, Mashimo Heisuke); Days 18: "Versus Sniper" (VSスナイパー, Bui Esu Sunaipā); Days 19: "Fight" (けんか, Kenka); Days 20: "Invisible Highway" (透明高速, Tōmei Kōsoku); Days 21: "Let's Go to the Museum!" (博物館に行こう！, Hakubutsukan ni Ikō!); Days 22: "Jurassic Bastard" (ジュラシック野郎, Jurashikku Yarō); Days 23: "Asakura and Shin" (朝倉とシン, Asakura to Shin); Days 24: "Assassins X Science" (殺し屋×科学, Koroshiya x Kagaku); Days 25: "Science Bastard" (サイエンス野郎, Saiensu Yarō)
4	November 4, 2021	978-4-08-882819-0	October 11, 2022	978-1-9747-3396-5
Days 26: "Order"; Days 27: "Sakamoto's vs. The Lab" (坂本商店 VS LABO, Sakamoto-shōten Buiesu Rabo); Days 28: "Top-Notch" (一流, Ichiryū); Days 29: "All Aboard" (かけこみ乗車, Kakekomi Jōsha); Days 30: "Quiet on the Train" (車内ではお静かに, Shanai de wa o Shizuka ni); Days 31: "See?" (ほらな, Hora na); Days 32: "Bathhouse Mode" (せんとうモード, Sentō Mōdo); Days 33: "Surprise" (サプライズ, Supuraizu); Days 34: "Wutang" (ウータン, Ūtan)
5	January 4, 2022	978-4-08-882879-4	December 13, 2022	978-1-9747-3441-2
Days 35: "Wutang, Part 2" (ウータン②, Ūtan 2); Days 36: "Wutang, Part 3" (ウータン③, Ūtan 3); Days 37: "Death Row Prisoner" (死刑囚, Shikeishu); Days 38: "No Brakes" (ノーブレーキ, Nōburēki); Days 39: "Encounter" (Note: Published in Japan as "Encount" (rendered in Latin script and all caps)); Days 40: "Overload"; Days 41: "How to Live" (生き様, Ikizama); Days 42: "Just Desserts" (ばちあたり, Ba chi Atari); Days 43: "I Love You" (すき。, Suki)
6	March 4, 2022	978-4-08-883072-8	February 14, 2023	978-1-9747-3621-8
Days 44: "Every Which Way" (レてんでんばらばら, Tendenbarabara); Days 45: "Strong Assault" (強襲, Kyōshū); Days 46: "Bad Luck" (ツいてないね, Tsu Itenai ne); Days 47: "Going Up" (上へ参ります, Ue e Mairimasu); Days 48: "The Heart Thread" (心の糸, Kokoro no Ito); Days 49: "Round and Round the Tower" (ぐるぐるタワー, Guruguru Tawā); Days 50: "Bicycle" (自転車, Jitensha); Days 51: "Parade" (パレード, Parēdo); Days 52: "Slice Slice Dance" (斬斬舞, Zan Zan Mai)
7	June 3, 2022	978-4-08-883147-3	April 11, 2023	978-1-9747-3680-5
Days 53: "No Way" (無理無理, Muri Muri); Days 54: "I Got This" (お安い御用, Oyasuigoyō); Days 55: "Break" (ブレーク, Burēku); Days 56: "JCC" (ジェーシーシー, Jēshīshī); Days 57: "Have a Nice Flight" (ハヴアナイスフライト, Havu a Naisu Furaito); Days 58: "Newbies" (新人, Rūkī); Days 59: "Cut"; Days 60: "Kanaguri" (カナグリ); Days 61: "Pretty Decent" (ちょっと得意なんです, Chotto Tokuina ndesu)
8	August 4, 2022	978-4-08-883191-6	June 6, 2023	978-1-9747-3862-5
Days 62: "Exam, Stage Three" (三次試験, Sanji Shiken); Days 63: "Survival" (サバイバル, Sabaibaru); Days 64: "Path" (道, Michi); Days 65: "Mutual Fans" (推し被り, Oshi Kaburi); Days 66: "Lag" (ラグ, Ragu); Days 67: "Remote Work" (リモートワーク, Rimōto Wāku); Days 68: "Fwollow Me" (くれりゅか, Kureryuka); Days 69: "Kaji" (カジ); Days 70: "Sounds vs. Gaku" (音(オト)VS(ブイエス)楽(ガク), Oto Buiesu Gaku)
9	November 4, 2022	978-4-08-883292-0	August 1, 2023	978-1-9747-3896-0
Days 71: "Hard Mode" (ハードモード, Hādo Mōdo); Days 72: "So Long" (じゃーな, Jāna); Days 73: "Killer Lotto Scratch" (コロレンスクラッチ, Kororen Sukuratchi); Days 74: "Undercover" (潜入, Sennyū); Days 75: "Damn Telepath" (くそエスパー, Kuso Esupā); Days 76: "Each One's Mission" (それぞれのミッション, Sorezore no Misshon); Days 77: "K-I-L-L-I-N-G" (コ・ロ・シ・テ・ル, Ko-ro-shi-te-ru); Days 78: "Banished" (追われた男, Owareta Otoko); Days 79: "Invisible Intent to Kill" (透明な殺意, Tōmeina Satsui)
10	February 3, 2023	978-4-08-883429-0	December 5, 2023	978-1-9747-4113-7
Days 80: "Reunion" (再會, Saikai); Days 81: "Test" (テスト, Tesuto); Days 82: "Aikido Love" (愛気道, Aikidō); Days 83: "Genius Style" (天才の流儀, Tensai no Ryūgi); Days 84: "What a Nice Smell" (いいにおい, Ii Nioi); Days 85: "Nightmare" (悪夢, Akumu); Days 86: "Third-Rate Style" (三流の流儀, Sanryū no Ryūgi); Days 87: "Database" (データバンク, Dētabanku); Days 88: "Clap" (ぱん, Pan)
11	April 4, 2023	978-4-08-883449-8	April 2, 2024	978-1-9747-4366-7
Days 89: "Sensei" (先生); Days 90: "Sensei, Part 2" (先生②, Sensei 2); Days 91: "Kanaguri Vs. Sakamoto" (京VS坂本, Kanaguri Buiesu Sakamoto); Days 92: "Deal" (取引, Torihiki); Days 93: "Rapport" (ラポール, Rapōru); Days 94: "Twisted" (ひねくれもの, Hinekuremono); Days 95: "Amane" (周(アマネ), Amane); Days 96: "Healthy" (ヘルシー, Herushī); Days 97: "One Blow" (一本, Ippon)
12	June 2, 2023	978-4-08-883555-6	June 4, 2024	978-1-9747-4589-0
Days 98: "Tora Tora" (とらとら); Days 99: "That Day" (あの日, Ano hi); Days 100: "Lightning Strikes" (雷電, Raiden); Days 101: "Secret Maneuvers" (暗躍, Anyaku); Days 102: "Final Curtain" (終幕, Shūmaku); Days 103: "Roll Film" (クランクイン, Kuranku In); Days 104: "Strange Feeling" (違和感, Iwakan); Days 105: "Each One's Goal" (それぞれの目的, Sorezore no Mokuteki); Days 106: "Reason" (理由, Riyū)
13	September 4, 2023	978-4-08-883633-1	September 3, 2024	978-1-9747-4888-4
Days 107: "Reminiscence" (追憶, Tsuioku); Days 108: "Assassin Department Store" (殺し屋デパート, Koroshi-ya Depāto); Days 109: "Kindaka" (キンダカ, Kindaka); Days 110: "Mission"; Days 111: "Bodyguard Assignment" (護衛任務, Goei Ninmu); Days 112: "Mini Mission" (プチミッション, Puchi Misshon); Days 113: "Car Chase" (カーチェイス, Kācheisu); Days 114: "Each One's Task" (それぞれの任務, Sorezore no Ninmu); Days 115: "The Good-Deed Collector" (徳を積む男, Tokuwotsumu Otoko)
14	November 2, 2023	978-4-08-883692-8	November 5, 2024	978-1-9747-4978-2
Days 116: "Friends" (ダチ, Dachi); Days 117: "Kill Without Moving" (動かず殺せ!, Ugokazu Korose!); Days 118: "Strength" (強さ, Tsuyo-sa); Days 119: "Goodbye" (別れ, Wakare); Days 120: "Final" (終局, Shūkyoku); Days 121: "Bizarre Data" (奇妙な痕跡, Kimyōna Konseki); Days 122: "Bad Feeling" (胸騒ぎ, Munasawagi); Days 123: "One Shot" (一発, Ippatsu); Days 124: "Kumanomi" (熊埜御, Kumanomi)
15	January 4, 2024	978-4-08-883793-2	January 7, 2025	978-1-9747-5169-3
Days 125: "My Turn" (俺の番, Ore no Ban); Days 126: "I'll Kill You Later" (後で殺す, Atode Korosu); Days 127: "See Ya" (あばよ, Abayo); Days 128: "Convergence" (収束, Shūsoku); Days 129: "Reunion" (再開, Saikai); Days 130: "Reunion, Part 2" (再開, Saikai); Days 131: "Deal" (取引成立, Torihiki Seiritsu); Days 132: "The Assassin Exhibition of the Century" (世紀の殺し屋展, Seiki no Koroshiya-ten); Days 133: "Bait" (餌, Esa)
16	April 4, 2024	978-4-08-883878-6	March 4, 2025	978-1-9747-5276-8
Days 134: "The End"; Days 135: "Kamihate" (上終, Kamihate); Days 136: "Kamihate, Part 2" (上終②, Kamihate 2); Days 137: "Trust" (信頼, Shinrai); Days 138: "Delivery" (デリバリー, Deribarī); Days 139: "Nothing Like It" (格別, Kakubetsu); Days 140: "Each One's Goal" (それぞれの目的, Sorezore no Mokuteki); Days 141: "Encounter" (邂逅, Kaigō); Days 142: "X's Goal" (Xの狙い, X no Nerai)
17	June 4, 2024	978-4-08-884120-5	May 6, 2025	978-1-9747-5587-5
Days 143: "Entry" (エントリー, Entorī); Days 144: "Kaiju" (かいじゅう, Kaijū); Days 145: "Crackle" (カチカチ, Kachikachi); Days 146: "Ghost" (おばけ, Obake); Days 147: "Uproar" (大騒ぎ, Ōsawagi); Days 148: "Fan Activities" (推し活, Oshikatsu); Days 149: "Protrusion" (凸, Totsu); Days 150: "Bullies" (いじめっ子, Ijimekko); Days 151: "Nagumo vs. Gaku" (南雲VS楽, Nagumo VS Gaku)
18	August 2, 2024	978-4-08-884131-1	August 5, 2025	978-1-9747-5594-3
Days 152: "Speedrun" (RTA); Days 153: "What It Takes to Kill" (殺しに必要なもの, Koroshi ni Hitsuyōnamono); Days 154: "Maniacs" (狂敵, Kyō Teki); Days 155: "Melee" (混戦, Konsen); Days 156: "Sportsman" (スポーツマン, Supōtsuman); Days 157: "Sportsmanship" (スポーツマンシップ, Supōtsumanshippu); Days 158: "Super Sumo" (超相撲, Chō Sumo); Days 159: "The Final Attack" (最後の一撃, Saigo no Ichigeki); Days 160: "Like My Master" (師匠ゆずり, Shishō Yuzuri); Days 161: "Shark" (サメ, Same)
19	November 1, 2024	978-4-08-884250-9	November 11, 2025	978-1-9747-5900-2
Days 162: "Familiar Faces" (懐かしの面子, Natsukashi no Mentsu); Days 163: "Misfortune" (厄, Yaku); Days 164: "Takamura" (篁, Takamura); Days 165: "Accessibility" (バリアフリー, Baria Furī); Days 166: "False Madman" (偽狂者, Gikyō-sha); Days 167: "Peering Into the Abyss" (深淵を覗く, Shin'en o Nozoku); Days 168: "Museum Closed" (閉館, Heikan); Days 169: "A New Mission" (新たなミッション, Aratana Misshon); Days 170: "Cake" (ケーキ, Kēki)
20	January 4, 2025	978-4-08-884389-6	January 6, 2026	978-1-9747-6230-9
Days 171: "Belonging" (居場所, Ibasho); Days 172: "Mirage" (蜃気楼, Shinkirō); Days 173: "Escape" (逃避行, Tōhikō); Days 174: "A Certain Skilled Assassin" (ある腕の立つ殺し屋, Aru ude no Tatsu Koroshiya); Days 175: "Karma" (業, Gō); Days 176: "Awaken" (醒める, Sameru); Days 177: "Kindaka" (キンダカ, Kindaka); Days 178: "Means and End" (手段と目的, Shudan to Mokuteki); Days 179: "Torres" (トーレス, Tōresu); Days 180: "I Know Someone" (心当たり, Kokoroatari)
21	March 4, 2025	978-4-08-884409-1	March 17, 2026	978-1-9747-6231-6
Days 181: "Welcome Party" (親睦会, Shinboku-kai); Days 182: "A Peaceful Day" (平和な一日, Heiwana Ichi-nichi); Days 183: "Jo Shackles" (枷錠, Kase Jō); Days 184: "Told Ya" (ほらね…, Hora ne…); Days 185: "Hunter" (狩人, Kariudo); Days 186: "Today's Fortune" (今日の運勢, Kyō no Unsei); Days 187: "Take A Chance" (イチかバチか…, Ichi ka Bachi ka…); Days 188: "Here and Now" (いまここで, Ima Koko de); Days 189: "Great Misfortune" (大凶, Daikyō); Days 190: "One in 10¯⁴⁰⁰⁰⁰" (10の4万乗分の1, 10 no 4 Man-jō-bun no 1)
22	June 4, 2025	978-4-08-884554-8	June 9, 2026	978-1-9747-6582-9
Days 191: "Out of Luck" (運のツキ, Un no Tsuki); Days 192: "True Feelings" (本音, Hon'ne); Days 193: "Tenkyu vs. Shin" (天弓VSシン, Tenkyū VS Shin); Days 194: "Tachypsychia" (タキサイキア, Takisaikia); Days 195: "I Know" (知ってる, Shitteru); Days 196: "First Encounter" (出会い, Deai); Days 197: "Seat Belt" (シートベルト, Shīto Beruto); Days 198: "Useful" (便利なやつ, Benrina Yatsu); Days 199: "Ikari" (イカリ)
23	August 4, 2025	978-4-08-884608-8	September 15, 2026	978-1-9747-6656-7
Days 200: "Bubbles" (ブクブクアワー, Bukubukuawā); Days 201: "What Took You?" (遅ぇよ, Oso~eyo); Days 202: "Last Chance" (ラストチャンス, Rasuto Chansu); Days 203: "Recovery" (復活, Fukkatsu); Days 204: "Revolution and Succession" (革命と継承, Kakumei to Keishō); Days 205: "A Three-Stage Revolution" (3発の革命, 3-Patsu no Kakumei); Days 206: "Forbidden Zone" (不可侵領域, Fukashin Ryōiki); Days 207: "The New JAA" (新生殺連, Shinsei Satsuren); Days 208: "Domino Effect" (連鎖, Rensa)
24	October 3, 2025	978-4-08-884692-7	December 15, 2026	978-1-9747-6851-6
Days 209: "An Ideal World" (理想の世界, Risō no Sekai); Days 210: "Hostility and Hostility" (殺意と殺意, Satsui to Satsui); Days 211: "Electric Shock Hazard" (感電注意, Kanden Chūi); Days 212: "Shin's Mission" (シンの作戦, Shin no Sakusen); Days 213: "Resistance" (レジスタンス, Rejisutansu); Days 214: "Lost Child" (迷子のお知らせ, Maigo no Oshirase); Days 215. "Sea of Corpses" (死屍累々, Shishiruirui); Days 216. "Tunnel" (トンネル, Ton'neru); Days 217. "It Starts With Me" (まずは俺から, Mazuwa ore Kara)
25	December 4, 2025	978-4-08-884810-5	February 16, 2027	978-1-9747-6949-0
Days 218. "Stop Acting Cool" (カッコつけんな, Kakko Tsuken na); Days 219. "Fake" (偽物, Nisemono); Days 220. "I Won't Let You Die!" (絶対助ける, Zettai Tasukeru); Days 221. "Protect" (守る, Mamoru); Days 222. "The Battle Begins" (開戦, Kaisen); Days 223. "Conceited" (自惚れ, Unubore); Days 224. "Security Escort" (護送, Gosō); Days 225. "Protecting What Matters" (守りたいもの, Mamoritai Mono); Days 226. "More than Friends, Less than Assassins" (友達以上殺し屋未満, Tomodachi ijō Koroshiya Miman)
26	March 4, 2026	978-4-08-884867-9	—	—
Days 227. "Determined" (覚悟, Kakugo); Days 228. "Lu" (ルーさん, Rū-san); Days 229. "New Record" (新記録, Shin Kiroku); Days 230. "Genius Sharpshooter" (狙撃の天才, Sogeki no Tensai); Days 231. "Expedition" (遠征, Ensei); Days 232. "Worry Wins" (心配が勝つ, Shinpai ga Katsu); Days 233. "It Is What It Is" (しゃあないか, Shānai ka); Days 234. "Room 307" (ルーム307, Rūmu 307); Days 235. "Big Brother" (兄貴, Aniki)
27	May 1, 2026	978-4-08-885034-4	—	—
Days 236. "Car Wash" (洗車, Sensha); Days 237. "Diabolical Enemy" (凶敵, Kyōteki); Days 238. "Revenge" (リベンジ, Ribenji); Days 239. "Tinderbox" (火蓋, Hibuta); Days 240. "Pride" (プライド, Puraido); Days 241. "Generous Serving" (爆盛り, Bakumori); Days 242. "A Young Girl's Memory" (少女の記録, Shōjo no Kiroku); Days 243. "The First Time…" (初めての…, Hajimete no…); Days 244. "Commercial Break" (広告, Kōkoku); Days 245. "Evolution" (進化, Shinka)
28	August 4, 2026	978-4-08-885131-0	—	—
Days 246. "Shishiba Said" (神々廻がいってた, Shishiba ga Itteta); Days 247. "On Me" (オゴリ, Ogori); Days 248. "Alike" (似たもの, Nitamono); Days 249. "Overclock" (オーバークロック, Ōbākurokku); Days 250. "Splut Splut" (どくどく, Dokudoku); Days 251. "Freedom" (自由, Jiyū); Days 252. "Reason" (理由, Riyū); Days 253. "God of Thunder" (雷神, Raijin); Days 254. "Showdown" (決着, Ketchaku); Days 255. "Just A Little Bit Now" (今なら少し, Imanara Sukoshi)
29	November 4, 2026	978-4-08-885235-5	—	—
Days 256. "Seconds" (数秒, Sūbyō); Days 257. "Genius" (天才, Tensai); Days 258. "Sonic Boom" (ソニックブーム, Sonikku Būmu); Days 259. "Band Man" (バンドマン, Bando Man); Days 260. "♪"; Days 261. "Wild Card" (想定外の男, Sōteigai no Otoko); Days 262. "Extreme Rock" (超ロック, Chō Rokku); Days 263. "Awakening" (目覚め, Mezame); Days 264. "The Ultimate Ideal" (理想の果て, Risō no Hate)

=== Chapters not yet in tankōbon format ===
These chapters have yet to be published in a tankōbon volume. They were originally serialized in Japanese in issues of Shueisha's magazine Weekly Shōnen Jump and its English digital version published by Viz Media and in Manga Plus by Shueisha.

- Days 265. "Atari's Reading" (アタリの予言, Atari no Yogen)
- Days 266. "No Limit"
- Days 267. "The Third Store" (3号店, San Gōten)
- Days 268. "Prisoner of the Past" (過去の檻, Kako no Ori)
- Days 269. "Inner Beast" (内なる獣, Uchinaru Kemono)
- Days 270. "Prime" (全盛期, Zenseiki)
- Days 271. "Melting Pot of Slaughter" (殺戮の坩堝, Satsuriku no Rutsubo)
- Days 272. "The Ultimate Assassin" (最強の殺し屋, Saikyō no Koroshiya)
- Days 273. "Wish" (望み, Nozomi)
- Days 274. "Multiple Choices" (幾重の選択, Ikue no Sentaku)
- Days 275. "Baton" (バトン, Baton)
- Days 276. "Since You're Here" (来たからには, Kita Kara ni wa)
- Days 277. "Whatever It Takes" (何でもいいから, Nani Demo Ikara)
- Days 278. "Next-Level" (その先, Sonosaki)
- Days 279. "Action!" (アクション!, Akushon!)
- Days 280. "Cinematic Violence" (シネマティックバイオレンス, Shinematikku Baiorensu)
- Days 281. "The Strongest Papa" (最強のパパ, Saikyō no Papa)
- Days 282. "Always Together" (ずっと一緒に, Zutto Issho ni)
- Days 283. "A New Normal" (新たな日常, Aratana Nichijō)
- Days 284. "See You Tomorrow" (また明日, Mata Ashita)

== Sakamoto Holidays ==
No.	Original release date	Original ISBN	English release date	English ISBN
1	January 4, 2025	978-4-08-882657-8	March 17, 2026	978-1-9747-6251-4
2	August 4, 2025	978-4-08-884571-5	August 18, 2026	978-1-9747-1677-7
3	May 1, 2026	978-4-08-884839-6	—	—
4	August 4, 2026	978-4-08-885142-6	—	—
