= Nine Dragons' Ball Parade =

Japanese manga series

- Cover of the first volume

クーロンズ・ボール・パレード (Kūronzu Bōru Parēdo)
- Genre: Sports
- Manga
- Written by: Mikiyasu Kamada
- Illustrated by: Ashibi Fukui
- Published by: Shueisha
- English publisher: NA: Viz Media
- Magazine: Weekly Shōnen Jump
- Original run: February 15, 2021 – July 4, 2021
- Volumes: 3
- icon

Nine Dragons' Ball Parade (Japanese: クーロンズ・ボール・パレード, Hepburn: Kūronzu Bōru Parēdo; "Kowloons' Ball Parade") is a Japanese manga series written by Mikiyasu Kamada and illustrated by Ashibi Fukui. It was serialized in Shueisha's Weekly Shōnen Jump magazine from February to July 2021, with its chapters collected into three tankōbon volumes.

== Publication ==
The series is written by Mikiyasu Kamada and illustrated by Ashibi Fukui. It was serialized in Shueisha's Weekly Shōnen Jump magazine from February 15 to July 4, 2021. Shueisha collected its chapters into three tankōbon volumes, released from June 4 to October 4, 2021.

Viz Media and Manga Plus published chapters of the series simultaneously with the Japanese release. Viz Media released digital volumes in September 2022.

=== Volumes ===
No.	Original release date	Original ISBN	English release date	English ISBN
1	June 4, 2021	978-4-08-882681-3	September 27, 2022	978-1-9747-3368-2
1. "The Start of a Dream" (夢のはじまり, Yume no Hajimari); 2. "First Encounter" (出会い, Deai); 3. "A New Dream" (新しい夢, Atarashī Yume); 4. "Yoshitaka Tsurugi" (剣義鷹, Tsurugi Yoshitaka); 5. "Moonlit Competition" (月夜の勝負, Tsukiyo no Shōbu); 6. "Hawk and Dragon" (鷹と龍, Taka to Ryū); 7. "A New Step" (新たな一歩, Aratana Ippo)
2	August 4, 2021	978-4-08-882730-8	September 27, 2022	978-1-9747-3684-3
8. "Rinnojo Tsubaki" (椿凛之丞, Tsubaki Rinnojō); 9. "The Battle with Minato Senior" (湊シニア戦, Minato Shinia-sen); 10. "The Makings of a Great Shortstop" (遊撃手の資質, Shōto no Shishitsu); 11. "How to Leverage Talent" (才能の活かし方, Sainō no Ikashikata); 12. "Wind" (風, Kaze); 13. "Karmic Ties" (因縁, Innen); 14. "Shiro Shiratori" (白鳥四郎, Shiratori Shirō); 15. "The Dragon Awakens" (臥竜目覚む, Garyō Mezamu); 16. "The Black Dragon Takes Off" (黒龍発進, Kokuryū Hasshin)
3	October 4, 2021	978-4-08-882789-6	September 27, 2022	978-1-9747-3685-0
17. "The Red Ambush" (紅い伏兵, Akai Fukuhei); 18. "Monster" (怪物, Kaibutsu); 19. "Everyone's September" (それぞれの9か月, Sorezore no Kyūkagetsu); 20. "Our Baseball" (僕達の野球, Bokutachi no Yakyū)
