= Soloist in a Cage =

Japanese manga series

- First tankōbon volume cover

檻ノ中のソリスト (Ori no Naka no Sorisuto)
- Genre: Action-thriller; Dystopian; Mystery
- Manga
- Written by: Shiro Moriya
- Published by: Shueisha
- English publisher: NA: Seven Seas Entertainment
- Imprint: Jump Comics+
- Magazine: Shōnen Jump+
- Original run: September 2018 – June 14, 2021
- Volumes: 3

Soloist in a Cage (Japanese: 檻ノ中のソリスト, Hepburn: Ori no Naka no Sorisuto) is a Japanese manga series written and illustrated by Shiro Moriya. It was serialized on the Shōnen Jump+ app and website from September 2018 to June 2021. As of September 2021, three volumes have been released.

== Plot ==
Seven-year-old Chloe and her baby brother Rock, (Note: The names Rock and Locke are both commonly used in English discussions of the manga and represent the same character.) who were abandoned by their parents, have spent their entire lives in Prison City, a city surrounded by giant concrete borders that is run like a literal prison and patrolled by robots day and night. The siblings, who are able to survive through the kindness of their neighbor Ross Sandberg, are inseparable. That is, until Chloe finds out about their neighbors' escape plan, and tries to secretly join them with her baby brother Rock. The two are separated in a tragic accident, and eleven years later, Chloe, now a seasoned warrior, returns to Prison City to try to find and rescue her little brother.

== Publication ==
The series is written and illustrated by Shiro Moriya. It started serialization on the Shōnen Jump+ manga app and website in September 2018. In March 2019, the series entered hiatus due to Moriya's health. It returned from hiatus on April 12, 2021. In May 2021, it was announced the series was entering its climax. The series published its final chapter on June 14, 2021. As of September 2021, the chapters have been collected into three tankōbon volumes.

In January 2019, Manga Plus launched its service, with the series being one of the titles available on the service in English at launch.

In September 2022, Seven Seas Entertainment announced their licensing of the series. The first volume was released in May 2023.

=== Volume list ===
No.	Original release date	Original ISBN	English release date	English ISBN
1	June 4, 2021	978-4-08-881526-8	May 9, 2023	978-1-63858-997-6
2	June 4, 2021	978-4-08-881598-5	September 12, 2023	978-1-63858-998-3
3	September 3, 2021	978-4-08-882779-7	January 9, 2024	978-1-63858-999-0

== Reception ==
Jacob Parker-Dalton from Otaquest praised the series, calling it "brimming with cinematic beauty" and comparing it to Judge Dredd and The Promised Neverland.
