= Diamond in the Rough (manga) =

Japanese manga series

- Cover of the first volume

アラガネの子 (Aragane no Ko)
- Genre: Adventure, fantasy
- Manga
- Written by: Nao Sasaki
- Published by: Shueisha
- Imprint: Jump Comics+
- Magazine: Shōnen Jump+
- Original run: November 25, 2020 – December 27, 2023
- Volumes: 9

Diamond in the Rough (Japanese: アラガネの子, Hepburn: Aragane no Ko) is a Japanese manga series written and illustrated by Nao Sasaki. It was serialized on Shueisha's Shōnen Jump+ manga website from November 2020 to December 2023. As of July 2024, the series' individual chapters have been collected into nine volumes.

== Publication ==
Written and illustrated by Nao Sasaki, the series began serialization on the Shōnen Jump+ manga website on November 25, 2020. The series reached its final arc on May 3, 2023 and concluded on December 27, 2023. As of July 2024, the series' individual chapters have been collected into nine tankōbon volumes.

The series is being published in English by Shueisha's Manga Plus service. The series is also licensed in France by Kana, and in Italy and Spain by Panini Comics.

=== Volumes ===
No.	Japanese release date	Japanese ISBN
1	March 4, 2021	978-4-08-882634-9
2	July 2, 2021	978-4-08-882702-5
3	October 4, 2021	978-4-08-882805-3
4	February 4, 2022	978-4-08-883015-5
5	June 3, 2022	978-4-08-883129-9
6	November 4, 2022	978-4-08-883269-2
7	April 4, 2023	978-4-08-883483-2
8	October 4, 2023	978-4-08-883641-6
9	March 4, 2024	978-4-08-883827-4

== Reception ==
In the 2021 Next Manga Award, the series ranked 17th in the web manga category. It was also nominated for the same award in 2022.
