= Sachi's Records: Sachi's Book of Revelation =

Japanese manga series

- First tankōbon volume cover

サチ録～サチの黙示録～ (Sachi-roku: Sachi no Mokushiroku)
- Genre: Comedy; Slice of life; Supernatural
- Manga
- Written by: Chanta
- Published by: Shueisha
- Imprint: Jump Comics+
- Magazine: Shōnen Jump+
- Original run: July 7, 2023 – April 24, 2025
- Volumes: 5

Sachi's Records: Sachi's Book of Revelation (Japanese: サチ録～サチの黙示録～, Hepburn: Sachi-roku: Sachi no Mokushiroku) is a Japanese manga series written and illustrated by Chanta. It was serialized on Shueisha's Shōnen Jump+ manga service from July 2023 to April 2025.

== Synopsis ==
A bratty human girl named Sachi has been chosen to decide the fate of humanity based on her choices while being looked after by an gluttonus angel named Ran and a wicked but honorable devil named Boros. If she performs enough good deeds, humanity will be saved. If not, it will be destroyed.

== Publication ==
Written and illustrated by Chanta, Sachi's Records: Sachi's Book of Revelation was serialized on Shueisha's Shōnen Jump+ manga service from July 7, 2023, to April 25, 2025. Its chapters were collected in five tankōbon volumes released from November 2, 2023, to July 4, 2025.

The series is published in English on Shueisha's Manga Plus platform.

No.	Release date	ISBN
1	November 2, 2023	978-4-08-883798-7
2	April 4, 2024	978-4-08-884040-6
3	September 4, 2024	978-4-08-884246-2
4	February 4, 2025	978-4-08-884437-4
5	July 4, 2025	978-4-08-884674-3

== Reception ==
The first volume was recommended by Akihito Tsukushi.

The series was nominated for the 10th Next Manga Awards in 2024 in the web category and was ranked fifth.
