= Fabricant 100 =

Japanese manga series

- First tankōbon volume cover, featuring Ashibi Yao and the titular No. 100 in the background

人造人間100 (Jinzō Ningen 100)
- Genre: Action; Gothic horror
- Manga
- Written by: Daisuke Enoshima
- Published by: Shueisha
- English publisher: NA: Viz Media
- Imprint: Jump Comics
- Magazine: Weekly Shōnen Jump
- Original run: December 5, 2022 – September 4, 2023
- Volumes: 5
- icon

Fabricant 100 (Japanese: 人造人間100, Hepburn: Jinzō Ningen 100) is a Japanese manga series written and illustrated by Daisuke Enoshima. It was serialized in Shueisha's shōnen manga magazine Weekly Shōnen Jump from December 2022 to September 2023 and collected into five volumes.

== Synopsis ==
The Yao family, whose bloodline is known for having abnormally long lifespans, were murdered by a group of people with supernatural abilities. This group consists of 'Fabricants'; Artificial beings crafted by a scientist looking for ways to create the perfect being. After his rejection and death, the Fabricants began to roam the world, seeking out people with extraordinary body parts, such as telescopic kinetic vision, to kill and harvest for their own. The sole survivor, 14-year-old Ashibi Yao, lived by making a pact with one of his family's killers, Fabricant No. 100, offering his body to her only after all other Fabricants have been killed. The odd pairing then set out to investigate abnormal murders to end the Fabricant's rampage once and for all.

== Publication ==
Written and illustrated by Daisuke Enoshima, the series originated as a one-shot published in Shueisha's shōnen manga magazine Weekly Shōnen Jump in October 2021. The one-shot was later turned into a full series, which was serialized in Weekly Shōnen Jump from December 5, 2022, to September 4, 2023, and collected into five tankōbon volumes.

During its serialization, Viz Media and Manga Plus published chapters of the series in English simultaneously with their Japanese release. Viz Media published the volumes digitally.

=== Volumes ===
| No. | Original release date | Original ISBN | English release date | English ISBN |
|---|---|---|---|---|
| 1 | April 4, 2023 | 978-4-08-883455-9 | May 27, 2025 | 978-1-9747-4138-0 |
01. "Ashibi Yao"; 02. "Fabricants"; 03. "Those with a Shared Goal"; 04. "Leash"; 05. "Ignorance"; 06. "Pawn"; 07. "Reflecting Mirror"
| 2 | June 2, 2023 | 978-4-08-883552-5 | May 27, 2025 | 978-1-9747-4733-7 |
08. "Denial"; 09. "Similar but Different"; 10. "Curtain Close"; 11. "To Stake Your Life"; 12. "Reunited"; 13. "Suffering"; 14. "Weakness"; 15. "The Reason for Emotion"; 16. "The Spark of Life"
| 3 | September 4, 2023 | 978-4-08-883632-4 | May 27, 2025 | 978-1-9747-4734-4 |
17. "Take It!"; 18. "To Each Their Own Strategy"; 19. "The Ethics of Self-Sacrifice"; 20. "Different Species"; 21. "No. 1"; 22. "The Former Latest Model"; 23. "Prometheus Flame"; 24. "Sorry"; 25. "Treason"
| 4 | November 2, 2023 | 978-4-08-883688-1 | May 27, 2025 | 978-1-9747-4735-1 |
26. "Something Off"; 27. "The Will to Die for the Cause"; 28. "Judgement"; 29. "Something More Precious Than Yourself"; 30. "Each with Their Own Logic"; 31. "Self-Sacrifice for Whom"
| 5 | November 2, 2023 | 978-4-08-883736-9 | May 27, 2025 | 978-1-9747-4736-8 |
32. "No. 99"; 33. "Collusion 2"; 34. "Indifferent"; 35. "The Answer"; 36. "Fulfilled Agreement"

== Reception ==
Jonathan Greenall of Comic Book Resources praised the dialog and "Frankenstein-like" horror elements in the story. Rowan Grover of Multiversity Comics praised the action, characters, and double-page spreads, though Grover felt its art "has never come off as the most intricate or visually detailed".

The series has been nominated for the Next Manga Award in the print manga category in 2023.
