= Tokyo Shinobi Squad =

Japanese manga series

- First tankōbon volume cover

トーキョー忍スクワッド
- Genre: Action
- Manga
- Written by: Yūki Tanaka
- Illustrated by: Kento Matsūra
- Published by: Shueisha
- English publisher: NA: Viz Media
- Imprint: Jump Comics
- Magazine: Weekly Shōnen Jump
- Original run: June 3, 2019 – December 9, 2019
- Volumes: 3

Tokyo Shinobi Squad (Japanese: トーキョー忍スクワッド) is a Japanese manga series written by Yūki Tanaka and illustrated by Kento Matsūra. it was serialized in Shueisha's Weekly Shōnen Jump magazine from June 2019 to December 2019, with its chapters have been collected in three tankōbon volumes as of January 2020.

== Publication ==
Written by Yūki Tanaka and illustrated by Kento Matsūra, in 2017, Tokyo Shinobi Squad first was published as a special one-shot chapter in Jump Giga, and was serialized in Shueisha's Weekly Shōnen Jump magazine from June 3, 2019, to December 9, 2019. Kodansha collected its chapters in three tankōbon volumes, released from September 4, 2019, to January 4, 2020.

The manga is digitally serialized by Viz Media and Manga Plus in English. The manga is also licensed in France by Kazé.

=== Volumes ===
No.	Japanese release date	Japanese ISBN
1	September 4, 2019	978-4-08-882101-6
2	November 1, 2019	978-4-08-882139-9
3	January 4, 2020	978-4-08-882201-3
