= Guardian of the Witch =

Japanese manga series

- First tankōbon volume cover

魔女の守人 (Majo no Moribito)
- Genre: Dark fantasy
- Manga
- Written by: Asahi Sakano
- Published by: Shueisha
- English publisher: NA: Viz Media
- Imprint: Jump Comics
- Magazine: Weekly Shōnen Jump
- Original run: February 3, 2020 – June 22, 2020
- Volumes: 3
- icon

Guardian of the Witch (Japanese: 魔女の守人, Hepburn: Majo no Moribito) is a Japanese manga series written and illustrated by Asahi Sakano. It was serialized in Shueisha's shōnen manga magazine Weekly Shōnen Jump from February 2020 to June 2020, with its chapters collected in three tankōbon volumes.

== Plot ==
In a world threatened by great evils, only the power of witches can stand against them. The story follows Fafner, the kingdom's strongest knight, as he guards the witch Manasfa.

== Publication ==
Written and illustrated by Asahi Sakano, Guardian of the Witch was serialized for nineteen chapters in Shueisha's shōnen manga magazine Weekly Shōnen Jump from February 3 to June 22, 2020. Shueisha collected its chapters in three tankōbon volumes, released from May 13 to September 4, 2020.

The manga was digitally published in English by Viz Media on their Shonen Jump service, while Shueisha published it on their Manga Plus online platform. Viz Media published the three volumes digitally on August 24, 2021.

=== Volumes ===
| No. | Original release date | Original ISBN | English release date | English ISBN |
|---|---|---|---|---|
| 1 | May 13, 2020 | 978-4-08-882325-6 | August 24, 2021 (digital) | 978-1-9747-1927-3 |
01. "Guardian of the Witch"; 02. "Escape"; 03. "Outside World"; 04. "Attack"; 05. "Maiden"; 06. "Flames"; 07. "Conclusion"
| 2 | August 4, 2020 | 978-4-08-882380-5 | August 24, 2021 (digital) | 978-1-9747-2938-8 |
08. "The Top-Hatted Inventor"; 09. "Drake's Training"; 10. "The Trial"; 11. "Valli"; 12. "Gravity Magic"; 13. "Conversations"; 14. "Battle for Escape"; Special One Shot: "Guardian of the Witch"
| 3 | September 4, 2020 | 978-4-08-882465-9 | August 24, 2021 (digital) | 978-1-9747-2939-5 |
15. "Weight"; 16. "Last Stand"; 17. "Guardian's Vow"; 18. "Leaving Home"; 19. "The Last Magic"; Special One Shot: "Flower on the Battlefield"; Special One Shot 2: "Strawberry Punch"
