= Neru: Way of the Martial Artist =

Japanese manga series by Minya Hiraga

- Cover of the first tankōbon volume

NERU-武芸道行- (Neru: Bugei Dōgyō)
- Genre: Martial arts
- Manga
- Written by: Minya Hiraga
- Published by: Shueisha
- English publisher: NA: Viz Media
- Magazine: Weekly Shōnen Jump
- Original run: July 5, 2021 – November 15, 2021
- Volumes: 3
- icon

Neru: Way of the Martial Artist (Japanese: NERU-武芸道行-, Hepburn: Neru: Bugei Dōgyō) is a Japanese manga series written and illustrated by Minya Hiraga. It was serialized in Shueisha's Weekly Shōnen Jump magazine from July to November 2021, with its chapters collected into three tankōbon volumes as of February 2022.

== Plot ==
Neruma Isami is a young man who is passionate about martial arts. Unsure of what he wants to do in life aside from train in martial arts, he meets Akebi Haiba, who takes him to Amato High School, an academy which is made up of students who study martial arts.

== Characters ==
Neruma Isami
A practicing martial artist, who was raised solely by his grandfather. He is nicknamed Neru by his classmates.
Akebi Haiba
A martial artist who takes an interest in Neru.
Toriichi Hartori
A practicing martial artist. Though not physically gifted, he is very academic.

== Publication ==
Written and illustrated by Minya Hiraga, Neru: Way of the Martial Artist was first published on the Weekly Shōnen Jump website in September 2020, before beginning full serialization in the main Weekly Shōnen Jump magazine on July 5, 2021. It ended serialization on November 15, 2021. Shueisha has collected its chapters into individual tankōbon volumes. The first volume was released on November 4, 2021. As of February 4, 2022, three volumes have been released.

Viz Media and Manga Plus are publishing chapters of the series simultaneously with the Japanese release.

=== Volumes ===
No.	Original release date	Original ISBN	English release date	English ISBN
1	November 4, 2021	978-4-08-882871-8	February 28, 2023	978-1-9747-3262-3
1. "Return of the Tengu" (天狗再来す, Tengu Sairaisu); 2. "Amato High School of the 18 Martial Arts" (天門武芸十八般高校, Amato Bugei Jūhatsu-ban Kōkō); 3. "Nagiwashin-Ryu" (凪和心流); 4. "Beginning" (口切り, Kuchikiri); 5. "Who Are You?" (何者, Nanimono); 6. "Leaves a Bad Taste" (気にくわない, Kinikuwanai); 7. "Girl Alert" (おなご注意報, Onago Chūihō)
2	January 4, 2022	978-4-08-883008-7	February 28, 2023	978-1-9747-3786-4
8. "Nozomiya" (望宮); 9. "Spill" (こぼれ, Kobore); 10. "Melting Snow" (雪解け, Yukidoke); 11. "Senpai" (先輩); 12. "Moving Forward" (前へ, Mae e); 13. "Curtains Open" (幕開け, Makuake); 14. "Abyss" (深淵, Shin'en); 15. "Unite" (仕合わす, Shiawasu); 16. "Kohai" (後輩, Kōhai)
3	February 4, 2022	978-4-08-883013-1	February 28, 2023	978-1-9747-3787-1
17. "Mother and Path and..." (母と道と, Haha to Michi to); 18. "The Tengu Dance" (天狗舞う, Tengu Mau)

== Reception ==
Steven Blackburn from Screen Rant criticized the series due to its similarities to Naruto. Contrary to Blackburn, Jacob Parker-Dalton from Otaquest offered the first chapter praise for it setting up the plot well.
