= Otr of the Flame =

Japanese manga series

- First tankōbon volume cover

灯火のオテル (Tomoshibi no Oteru)
- Genre: Dark fantasy; Historical
- Manga
- Written by: Yuki Kawaguchi
- Published by: Shueisha
- English publisher: NA: Viz Media
- Imprint: Jump Comics
- Magazine: Weekly Shōnen Jump
- Original run: May 12, 2025 – January 19, 2026
- Volumes: 4
- icon

Otr of the Flame (Japanese: 灯火のオテル, Hepburn: Tomoshibi no Oteru) is a Japanese manga series written and illustrated by Yuki Kawaguchi. It was serialized in Shueisha's shōnen manga magazine Weekly Shōnen Jump from May 2025 to January 2026. As of March 2026, four volumes have been released.

== Publication ==
Written and illustrated by Yuki Kawaguchi, the series was serialized in Shueisha's shōnen manga magazine Weekly Shōnen Jump from May 12, 2025, to January 19, 2026. As of March 2026, the series' individual chapters have been collected into four tankōbon volumes.

Viz Media and Manga Plus published the series in English simultaneously with its Japanese release. The series received physical releases from european publishers, like Ivrea (Spain), Panini Comics (Italy) and Loewe Verlag (Germany), licensing is made through VME PLB SLS.

=== Volumes ===
No.	Japanese release date	Japanese ISBN
1	September 4, 2025	978-4-08-884610-1
2	November 4, 2025	978-4-08-884747-4
3	February 4, 2026	978-4-08-884835-8
4	March 4, 2026	978-4-08-884899-0

== Reception ==
Joshua Fox of Screen Rant, reviewing the first chapter, said Otr of the Flame could be a "massive hit", praising the art and writing.

== See also ==
- The Hunters Guild: Red Hood, another manga by Yuki Kawaguchi
