= Home at the Horizon =

Japanese manga series

- First tankōbon volume cover

おかえり水平線 (Okaeri Suiheisen)
- Genre: Drama
- Manga
- Written by: Taiyō Watabe
- Published by: Shueisha
- Imprint: Jump Comics+
- Magazine: Shōnen Jump+
- Original run: March 23, 2025 – present
- Volumes: 4

Home at the Horizon (Japanese: おかえり水平線, Hepburn: Okaeri Suiheisen) is a Japanese manga series written and illustrated by Taiyō Watabe. It began serialization on Shueisha's Shōnen Jump+ manga service in March 2025.

It won the 2026 Next Manga Award in the web manga category.

== Synopsis ==
The series is centered around two half-brothers, Ryoma Kakiuchi and Reo Shibasaki. Ryoma tends to assist his grandfather in running the local bathhouse after school. One day, as he does his routine, a boy named Reo comes in claiming to be Ryoma's dad's illegitimate son, hoping to see his dad. When Reo is told that their dad has passed on, he decides to return, but Ryoma stops him and asks him to help at the bathhouse.

== Characters ==
Ryoma Kakiuchi (柿内遼馬, Kakiuchi Ryōma)
Voiced by: Rikuya Yasuda (vomic)
Reo Shibasaki (柴崎玲臣, Shibasaki Reo)
Voiced by: Nobunaga Shimazaki (vomic)

== Media ==
=== Manga ===
Written and illustrated by Taiyō Watabe, Home at the Horizon began serialization on Shueisha's Shōnen Jump+ manga service on March 23, 2025. Its chapters have been collected in four tankōbon volumes as of September 2026.

The series' chapters are simultaneously published in English on Shueisha's Manga Plus app.

No.	Release date	ISBN
1	July 4, 2025	978-4-08-884585-2
2	November 4, 2025	978-4-08-884767-2
3	April 3, 2026	978-4-08-885032-0
4	September 4, 2026	978-4-08-885260-7

=== Other ===
In commemoration of the release of the second volume, a voice comic adaptation was uploaded to the Shōnen Jump+ YouTube channel on November 4, 2025. It featured performances from Rikuya Yasuda and Nobunaga Shimazaki as the two leads.

== Reception ==
The first volume featured a recommendation from manga artist Kocha Agasawa.

The series was ranked sixth in the 4th Crea Late Night Manga Awards in 2025 hosted by Bungeishunjū's Crea magazine. The series was nominated for the 19th Manga Taishō in 2026, and ranked fourth. The series won the 12th Next Manga Award in 2026 in the web category.
