= Blooming Love =

Japanese manga series

- First tankōbon volume cover, featuring Kyoko Sugisaki

半人前の恋人 (Hanninmae no Koibito)
- Genre: Romantic comedy
- Manga
- Written by: Daichi Kawada
- Published by: Shueisha
- Imprint: Jump Comics+
- Magazine: Shōnen Jump+
- Original run: May 9, 2023 – December 2, 2025
- Volumes: 7
- icon

Blooming Love (半人前の恋人, Hanninmae no Koibito) is a Japanese web manga series written and illustrated by Daichi Kawada. It was serialized on Shueisha's Shōnen Jump+ app and website from May 2023 to December 2025, and its chapters were collected in seven tankōbon volumes.

== Synopsis ==
Shintaro Ibuki is a high school student who excels at art, mastering illustrations but underperforming at craftsmanship. Kyoko Sugisaki is another high school student who excels at art, though she masters craftsmanship but underperforms at illustrations. The series is centered around their relationship both during and after high school.

== Characters ==
Shintaro Ibuki (伊吹進太郎, Ibuki Shintarō)
Kyoko Sugisaki (杉崎響子, Sugisaki Kyōko)

== Publication ==
Written and illustrated by Daichi Kawada, Blooming Love was serialized on Shueisha's Shōnen Jump+ app and website from May 9, 2023, to December 2, 2025. Its chapters have been collected in seven tankōbon volumes as of January 2026.

The series is published in English on Shueisha's Manga Plus platform.

=== Volumes ===
No.	Release date	ISBN
1	September 4, 2023	978-4-08-883659-1
2	January 4, 2024	978-4-08-883763-5
3	June 4, 2024	978-4-08-884074-1
4	October 4, 2024	978-4-08-884185-4
5	March 4, 2025	978-4-08-884425-1
6	August 4, 2025	978-4-08-884626-2
7	January 5, 2026	978-4-08-884830-3

== Reception ==
The series has been praised by manga creator Kōhei Horikoshi.
