= Time Paradox Ghostwriter =

Japanese manga series

- First tankōbon volume cover

タイムパラドクスゴーストライター (Taimu Paradokusu Gōsutoraitā)
- Manga
- Written by: Kenji Ichima
- Illustrated by: Tsunehiro Date
- Published by: Shueisha
- English publisher: NA: Viz Media
- Magazine: Weekly Shōnen Jump
- Original run: May 18, 2020 – August 30, 2020
- Volumes: 2
- icon

Time Paradox Ghostwriter (Japanese: タイムパラドクスゴーストライター, Hepburn: Taimu Paradokusu Gōsutoraitā) is a Japanese manga written by Kenji Ichima and illustrated by Tsunehiro Date. It was serialized in Shueisha's shōnen manga magazine Weekly Shōnen Jump from May 2020 to August 2020, and published in two volumes.

== Synopsis ==
The up and coming manga artist Teppei Sasaki has worked to become serialised in the pages of Weekly Shōnen Jump to be rejected time after time. When the most recent one-shot, he set every one of his expectations in as dismissed. Teppei resolves that following four years, he ought to simply stop. In any case, similarly as he settles on the choice, lightning strikes his loft, intertwining his microwave and ice chest together. As he examines the wreck, the microwave lets out a magazine: an issue of Weekly Shōnen Jump from 10 years from here on out.

Frontlining this issue is another serialization named "White Knight" by Itsuki Aino, a presentation so immaculate that it moves Teppei profoundly. At the point when the issue vanishes from that point, Teppei accepts that the thought came from his own creative mind and rapidly attempts to duplicate it down as his own one-shot. Submitting it to Shounen Jump, the editors are astonished and conclude that the work is adequate to run as a series. With his fantasies at last understood, Teppei attempts to refine the one-shot and its debut before long. In the mean time, somewhere else, a 17-year-old Itsuki Aino opens the most recent issue of Weekly Shōnen Jump to observe her fledgling story inside its pages, a reality that will before long come crashing downward on Teppei.

== Publication ==
Written by Kenji Ichima and illustrated by Tsunehiro Date, Time Paradox Ghostwriter was serialized in Shueisha's shōnen manga magazine Weekly Shōnen Jump from May 18 to August 30, 2020. Shueisha collected its chapters in two tankōbon volumes, released on August 4 and October 2, 2020.

Viz Media and Manga Plus published chapters of the series simultaneously with the Japanese release.

=== Volume list ===
No.	Original release date	Original ISBN	English release date	English ISBN
1	August 4, 2020	978-4-08-882384-3	July 27, 2021 (digital)	978-1-9747-2050-7
1. "Jump Through Weekly Time!"; 2. "The Story That Couldn't Stop"; 3. "Two of a Kind"; 4. "Counterfeit"; 5. "A True Counterfeit"; 6. "Stop!"; 7. "Time Paradox Ghostwriter"
2	October 2, 2020	978-4-08-882431-4	July 27, 2021 (digital)	978-1-9747-2891-6
8. "Message"; 9. "After the Blank Page"; 10. "Itsuki Aino"; 11. "Victory and Defeat"; 12. "Unfinished World"; 13. "Writer"; 14. "Back Then"; "Special Bonus Chapter: Until That Someday"
