= The Hunters Guild: Red Hood =

Japanese manga series by Yuki Kawaguchi

- First tankōbon volume cover, featuring Grimm (above) and Velou (below)

レッドフード (Reddo Fūdo)
- Genre: Fantasy; Horror
- Manga
- Written by: Yuki Kawaguchi
- Published by: Shueisha
- English publisher: NA: Viz Media
- Imprint: Jump Comics
- Magazine: Weekly Shōnen Jump
- Original run: June 28, 2021 – November 8, 2021
- Volumes: 3
- icon

The Hunters Guild: Red Hood, known simply as Red Hood (Japanese: レッドフード, Hepburn: Reddo Fūdo) in Japan, is a manga series written and illustrated by Yuki Kawaguchi. It was serialized in publisher Shueisha's Weekly Shōnen Jump magazine from June to November 2021.

== Premise ==
The series focuses on the young boy Velou, who is invited by a woman named Grimm to join a guild that specializes in hunting werewolves.

== Publication ==
Written and illustrated by Yuki Kawaguchi, The Hunters Guild: Red Hood was serialized in Shueisha's shōnen manga magazine Weekly Shōnen Jump from June 28 to November 8, 2021. Shueisha collected its chapters in three tankōbon volumes, released on November 4, 2021, to March 4, 2022.,

The series has been licensed for simultaneous publication in North America as it is released in Japan, with its chapters being digitally launched in English by Shueisha on its Manga Plus service, as well as by Viz Media on its service. Viz Media released the series in physical volumes starting on December 13, 2022.

=== Volumes ===
No.	Original release date	Original ISBN	English release date	English ISBN
1	November 4, 2021	978-4-08-882860-2	December 13, 2022	978-1-9747-3468-9
1. "The Red Huntress" (赤い狩人, Akai Kariudo); 2. "Doudou & Naraoia" (ドドーとナラオイア, Dodō to Naraoia); 3. "Of Werewolves and Hunters" (人狼とは。狩人とは。, Jinrō to wa. Karyūdo to wa.); 4. "Plans" (作戦, Sakusen); 5. "Smoke Signal" (狼煙, Noroshi); 6. "Beginning of Part 2: The Outside World" (第二章 外の世界, Dainishō Soto no Sekai); 7. "The Ironworks" (アイアンワークス, Aianwākusu)
2	January 4, 2022	978-4-08-882876-3	February 14, 2023	978-1-9747-3622-5
8. "Hot-Blooded Debonair" (熱血のデボネア, Nekketsu no Debonea); 9. "The Exam Begins" (試験開始, Shiken Kaishi); 10. "The Six's Plan" (6人の作戦, Rokunin no Sakusen); 11. "Merriopios" (メリオピオス, Meriopiosu); 12. "Bonkers" (ボンカース, Bonkāsu); 13. "It Takes All Kinds" (いろんな奴, Ironna Yatsu)
3	March 4, 2022	978-4-08-883031-5	April 11, 2023	978-1-9747-3634-8
14. "The 42nd Final Debarkation Exam" (第42期最終降車試験, Dai Yonjūni-ki Saishū Kōsha Shiken); 15. "End of the Line" (終点, Shūten); 16. "The True Book" (真実の本, Shinjitsu no Hon); 17. "Holograms" (ホログラム, Horoguramu); 18. "The Battle Is..." (戦いは, Tatakai wa)

== See also ==
- Otr of the Flame, another manga by Yuki Kawaguchi
