= Hope You're Happy, Lemon =

Japanese manga series

- First tankōbon volume cover, featuring Lemon Nishikawa

クソ女に幸あれ (Kuso Onna ni Sachiare)
- Genre: Romantic comedy
- Manga
- Written by: Mizuki Kishikawa
- Published by: Shueisha
- English publisher: NA: Seven Seas Entertainment
- Imprint: Jump Comics+
- Magazine: Shōnen Jump+
- Original run: October 15, 2023 – September 13, 2026
- Volumes: 12

Hope You're Happy, Lemon (クソ女に幸あれ, Kuso Onna ni Sachiare) is a Japanese manga series written and illustrated by Mizuki Kishikawa. It was serialized on Shueisha's Shōnen Jump+ manga service from October 2023 to November 2026, with its chapters compiled into twelve tankōbon volumes. The series follows Sunao Akiyoshi, a university student who suddenly starts swapping bodies with his old girlfriend, Lemon Nishikawa.

== Plot ==
As a junior high school student, Sunao Akiyoshi was in a relationship with his childhood friend Lemon Nishikawa. However, Lemon confessed to Sunao that she had been cheating on him with three different men and broke up with him. Since that day, Sunao has struggled to move on, but is slowly trying to begin a new relationship with fellow university student and film club member Natsumi Kogahara.

One day, Sunao unexpectedly reunites with Lemon on an outing. The next morning, he wakes up in Lemon's body, and Lemon shows up in his body; the two later realize they have started swapping bodies on alternating days. Meanwhile, Sunao discovers that not only is Lemon a student at a top-tier school, she is also roommates with Kogahara. The story follows the trio as they navigate their situation and their feelings for each other.

== Characters ==
Sunao Akiyoshi (秋吉 直, Akiyoshi Sunao)
The main protagonist. Ever since the end of his relationship with Lemon, Sunao has struggled to move on romantically. He is kind and selfless, but often struggles with anxiety. In the present day, he tries to pursue a relationship with Kogahara, which becomes constantly complicated by his body swapping with Lemon.
Lemon Nishikawa (西川 檸檬, Nishikawa Remon)
Sunao's former girlfriend who broke up with him after confessing to cheating. She was popular in high school, and is well-liked at university. When she starts body swapping with Sunao, she tries to keep it a secret and help him start a relationship with Kogahara. It is later revealed that when Lemon had lied about cheating as a way to end their relationship because she was too scared to confront her feelings for Sunao, which continue to this day.
Natsumi Kogahara (小河原 菜摘, Kogahara Natsumi)
The target of Sunao's affection, and Lemon's roommate and best friend. She is one year older than Sunao and Lemon. She is also well-liked at university, and a member of the film club along with Sunao. She likes Sunao and has begun going out with him, but is initially unaware of his body swapping with Lemon, which sometimes happens on their dates together.
Suzuka (鈴鹿)
Sunao's close friend at university. He is also a member of his university's film club. He is logical and rational to the point of often annoying Sunao. He had a crush on Lemon before finding out about Sunao and Lemon's secret.
Raika Asagi (浅儀 来花, Asagi Raika)
A fan of Lemon who knows Sunao and Lemon's secret. Although she initially dislikes Sunao, she eventually warms up to him and tries to help him deal with his situation.

== Production ==
Mizuki Kishikawa, the creator of the series, said in an interview that character outfits can help reinforce a story's setting and characterization. Since the story focuses on university students, Kishikawa needed to constantly design casual outfits. Although Kishikawa initially struggled with drawing clothing, they improved their skills through consistent practice with full-body illustrations.

When creating the characters' outfits, Kishikawa usually first chose one or two items they wanted to draw, then built the rest of the outfit around them. They generally selected clothing based on the style that they felt would best suit each character, and would often reference brand lookbooks featuring those styles. Kishikawa also drew inspiration from music videos, magazines, and outfit of the day posts on social media. Accessories such as bags were varied less; Kishikawa felt it would be unrealistic for university students to own too many.

Because the series is primarily drawn in black and white, Kishikawa sought to balance each character's design so that it was neither too dark or light, such as having darker-haired characters wear lighter-colored clothing on their upper bodies. For the full-color illustrations accompanying the series, Kishikawa avoided color choices that clashed with the characters' natural traits, such as their eye colors. In addition, Kishikawa incorporated color combinations that were fashionable at the time, which they did by checking recently released clothing and store displays.

== Publication ==
Hope You're Happy, Lemon is written and illustrated by Mizuki Kishikawa. It was serialized on Shueisha's Shōnen Jump+ manga service from October 15, 2023, to September 13, 2026. Its chapters were collected into twelve tankōbon volumes released from January 1, 2024 to November 4, 2026.

The series was simultaneously published in English on Shueisha's Manga Plus platform. In January 2025, Seven Seas Entertainment announced that they had licensed the series for English publication, with the first volume being released in October 2025.

No.	Original release date	Original ISBN	English release date	English ISBN
1	January 1, 2024	978-4-08-883746-8	October 28, 2025	979-8-89561-315-3
Chapters 1–4; Bonus
2	May 2, 2024	978-4-08-884075-8	January 13, 2026	979-8-89561-316-0
Chapters 5–11; Bonus
3	August 2, 2024	978-4-08-884147-2	May 19, 2026	979-8-89561-317-7
Chapters 12–18; Bonus
4	October 4, 2024	978-4-08-884242-4	September 15, 2026	979-8-89561-358-0
Chapters 19–27; Bonus
5	January 4, 2025	978-4-08-884304-9	January 12, 2027	979-8-89765-608-0
6	April 4, 2025	978-4-08-884498-5	May 11, 2027	979-8-89765-609-7
7	July 4, 2025	978-4-08-884631-6	—	—
8	October 3, 2025	978-4-08-884666-8	—	—
9	January 5, 2026	978-4-08-884855-6	—	—
10	May 1, 2026	978-4-08-885109-9	—	—
11	August 4, 2026	978-4-08-885112-9	—	—
12	November 4, 2026	978-4-08-885152-5	—	—

== Reception ==
=== Accolades ===
The series was nominated for the 10th Next Manga Awards in 2024 in the web category and ranked fourth. It was nominated in the Daruma for Best Romance Manga category at the Japan Expo Awards in 2026.

=== Critical reception ===
Zach Zamora of Screen Rant acclaimed the series, calling it unique and the "next big thing" in the romantic comedies of manga. He argued that while the premise was otherwise typical, the story elevated itself through putting "compelling characters in complicated scenarios". He praised the body-swapping narrative for focusing on Sunao and Lemon's mutual feelings rather than comedic scenarios typical for the trope, as well as the unusual narrative situations, which he felt "made even ordinary character interactions entertaining".

Kevin Cormack of Anime News Network gave the first volume a positive review, describing it as "adorable" and "utterly enchanting". He praised the likability of the "sweetest little trio" of characters, finding their interactions consistently amusing throughout the story. He was also generally positive about the art style, which he called "super-cute" despite a relatively simple design. Bolts, reviewing for the same site, was less enthused. Although he commended Sunao's characterization, he disliked Lemon, who he found less sympathetic. He ultimately decided to stick with the series, but felt that there was some "missed potential" in the storyline.
