= Earthchild =

Japanese manga series

- Cover of the tankōbon volume

地球の子 (Chikyū no Ko)
- Genre: Romance; Science fiction
- Manga
- Written by: Hideo Shinkai
- Published by: Shueisha
- English publisher: NA: Viz Media
- Imprint: Jump Comics
- Magazine: Weekly Shōnen Jump
- Original run: February 21, 2022 – September 5, 2022
- Volumes: 3
- icon

Earthchild (Japanese: 地球の子, Hepburn: Chikyū no Ko) is a Japanese manga series written and illustrated by Hideo Shinkai. It was serialized in Shueisha's Weekly Shōnen Jump magazine from February to September 2022; as of October 2022, its chapters have been collected into three tankōbon volumes.

== Plot ==
A normal human falls in love with the most powerful superheroine. Now he has to raise their child by himself after she sacrifices her life to save Earth.

== Publication ==
Written and illustrated by Hideo Shinkai, the series was serialized in Shueisha's Weekly Shōnen Jump magazine from February 21 to September 5, 2022. As of October 2022, the series' individual chapters have been collected into three tankōbon volumes.

Viz Media and Manga Plus are publishing the series in English simultaneously with the Japanese release. Viz Media will begin releasing volumes digitally in Q2 2024.

=== Volumes ===
No.	Release date	ISBN
1	June 3, 2022	978-4-08-883146-6
Disclosure 01. "You Are the Earth and I am the Moon"; Disclosure 02. "And So, The Moon Swore Never to Turn Away"; Disclosure 03. "We Shall Meet at the Lagrange Point"; Disclosure 04. "Firework Crafting and Rain That Keeps Us Together"; Disclosure 05. "Comet Homecoming"; Disclosure 06. "The Thread That Connects the Light Between Heaven and Earth"; Disclosure 07. "Human Comedy"
2	August 4, 2022	978-4-08-883194-7
Disclosure 08. "Binary Dark Zero"; Disclosure 09. "Binary Lights One"; Disclosure 10. "Mellow Lip Service, True Feelings That Are Totally Not Mainstream"; Disclosure 11. "Rendezvous Pitch Maneuver"; Disclosure 12. "What Becomes of a Satellite That's Lost Its Planet?"; Disclosure 13. "Because You're So Kind"; Disclosure 14. "Peek-a-Boo Pledge"; Disclosure 15. "Swimming in the Galaxy on Earth"; Disclosure 16. "My Final Gift to You"
3	October 4, 2022	978-4-08-883289-0
Disclosure 17. "Ovation for the Waltz Between Earth and Moon"; Disclosure 18. "Hypernova"; Disclosure 19. "Apoptosis"; Disclosure 20. "The Star-Bringing Night"; Disclosure 21. "Mission Accomplished, Reisuke Sawada"; Disclosure 22. "Infinity on High"; Disclosure 23. "Memories Are No Safe Haven"; Disclosure 24. "The Woman at the Mercy of the Tide and the Man Who Saved Her"; Disclosure 25. "Unvarnished"; Disclosure 26. "Exclusive Family Trip"; Disclosure 27. "Reisuke Sawada's Day of Destiny"

== Reception ==
Ryoko Fukuda from Real Sound offered praise for the characters and artwork. Steven Blackburn from Screen Rant also offered praise, calling the series emotional.
