= Under Doctor =

Japanese manga series

- First tankōbon volume cover
- Genre: Action; Medical drama
- Manga
- Written by: Kyō Tanimoto
- Published by: Shueisha
- English publisher: NA: Viz Media
- Imprint: Jump Comics
- Magazine: Weekly Shōnen Jump
- Original run: January 26, 2026 – present
- Volumes: 3

Under Doctor (stylized in all caps) is a Japanese manga series written and illustrated by Kyō Tanimoto. It has been serialized in Shueisha's shōnen manga magazine Weekly Shōnen Jump since January 2026. As of November 2026, three volumes have been released.

== Plot ==
Haiji Kino, known in the criminal underworld as the "Under Doctor," is regarded as the greatest doctor and a living legend in the series' universe. He carries the reputation: "If you want to live, he's the doctor you go to; however, if you want to die, do not seek him out."

== Publication ==
Written and illustrated by Kyō Tanimoto, the series began serialization in Shueisha's shōnen manga magazine Weekly Shōnen Jump on January 26, 2026. As of November 2026, the series' individual chapters have been collected into three tankōbon volumes.

Viz Media and Manga Plus are publishing chapters of the series in English simultaneously with their Japanese release. Additionally, VIZ announced that they licensed the manga set to be released in English in 2027.

A voice comic adaptation was produced to promote the release of the first volume.

Yasuhiko Tomita, a professor at Kyorin University School of Medicine, is the medical consultant on the manga.

=== Volumes ===
No.	Release date	ISBN
1	June 4, 2026	978-4-08-885086-3
Chapter 1: The Doctor Named Haiji; Chapter 2: A Normal Doctor; Chapter 3: Salvation; Chapter 4: Pro; Chapter 5: Child of the Grim Reaper; Chapter 6: Newborn Cry; Chapter 7: What I can Do on My Own
2	August 4, 2026	978-4-08-885132-7
Chapter 8: PAIS; Chapter 9: An Arrogant Doctor; Chapter 10: Miracle Man; Chapter 11: Groping in the Darkness; Chapter 12: Overload Haiji; Chapter 13: High Speed; Chapter 14: Way to Life; Chapter 15: Chiwako's Day Off; Chapter 16: Shuli's Doctor Road
3	November 4, 2026	978-4-08-885236-2
Chapter 17: "You Can Do It, Hana!"; Chapter 18: "The Snake Whisperers"; Chapter 19: "Haiji and Kusumi"; Chapter 20: "Doctor, Food, Shelter!"; Chapter 21: "The Fake Doctor and the Under Doctor"; Chapter 22: "The Fake Doctor and the *Chapter 23: "Under Doctor, Part 2"; Chapter 24: "Stun Gun to the Head"; Chapter 25: "Haiji and Shuli's Exciting Snowy Mountain Adventure"; Chapter 26: "Scared"; Bonus: U & D Gag OneShot

=== Chapters not yet in tankōbon format ===
17. "Haiji's Long Day, Part 1"
18. "Haiji's Long Day, Part 2"
19. "Haiji's Long Day, Part 3"
20. "Second Best"
21. "The Four Brains"
22. "Point of No Return"
23. "Those Who Resist, Part 1"
24. "Those Who Resist, Part 2"
25. "Chiwako's"
26. "Back to back"
27. "Shuli Rush"
28. "Doctor Off"
29. "Bloody Battle"
30. "Snakes and Sake"

== Reception ==
The series was recommended by Kōhei Horikoshi.

Tulisha Srivastava of ComicBook.com described the first chapter as "exciting" and called it a successor to Sakamoto Days. J.R. Waugh of Screen Rant described it as "fun, uniquely odd Shonen Jump action" and compared the plot to House. Isaiah Colbert of Aftermath liked the emphasis on the accuracy of the medical procedures. He also praised the main character, calling him easy to root for.
