= I Tell C =

Japanese manga series

- First tankōbon volume cover

アイテルシー (Aiterushī)
- Genre: Comedy; Mystery; Suspense
- Manga
- Written by: Kazusa Inaoka
- Published by: Shueisha
- English publisher: NA: Viz Media
- Imprint: Jump Comics
- Magazine: Weekly Shōnen Jump
- Original run: February 1, 2021 – June 28, 2021
- Volumes: 3
- icon

I Tell C (Japanese: アイテルシー, Hepburn: Aiterushī), stylized as i tell c, is a Japanese manga series written and illustrated by Kazusa Inaoka. It was serialized in Shueisha's Weekly Shōnen Jump magazine from February to June 2021, with its chapters collected into three tankōbon volumes.

== Publication ==
The series is written and illustrated by Kazusa Inaoka. It was serialized in Shueisha's Weekly Shōnen Jump magazine from February 1 to June 28, 2021. Shueisha collected its chapters into three tankōbon volumes, released from April 30 to September 3, 2021.

Viz Media and Manga Plus published chapters of the series simultaneously with the Japanese release. Viz Media released digital volumes in Q3 2022.

=== Volumes ===
No.	Original release date	Original ISBN	English release date	English ISBN
1	April 30, 2021	978-4-08-882660-8	August 23, 2022	978-1-9747-3380-4
1. "Gaze" (眤, I); 2. "Jewel" (瓊, Ni); 3. "Bright" (燦, San); 4. "Start" (始, Shi); 5. "After" (後, Go); 6. "Kill" (僇, Roku); 7. "Loss" (失, Shichi)
2	July 2, 2021	978-4-08-882705-6	August 23, 2022	978-1-9747-3381-1
8. "Grasp" (把, Ha); 9. "Revenge" (仇, Kyū); 10. "Hun" (銃, Jū); 11. "Beauty" (娃, A); 12. "Stay" (居, I); 13. "Above" (上, U); 14. "Painting" (画, E); "Special Chapter 1" (Special #1); "Special Chapter 2" (Special #2)
3	September 3, 2021	978-4-08-882759-9	August 23, 2022	978-1-9747-3382-8
15. "Warm" (暖, O); 16. "Carriage" (駕, Ka); 17. "Plan" (企, Ki); 18. "Demand" (求, Ku); 19. "Hope" (希, Ke); 20. "Blast" (炸, Sa); 21. "n"; "Special One-Shot: Shinobi Shinobazu" (特別読切「シノビシノバズ」, Tokubetsu Yomikiri "Shinobi Shinobazu")
