= Wild Strawberry (manga) =

Japanese manga series by Ire Yonemoto

- First tankōbon volume cover

ワイルドストロベリー (Wairudo Sutoroberī)
- Genre: Fantasy; Post-apocalyptic
- Manga
- Written by: Ire Yonemoto
- Published by: Shueisha
- English publisher: NA: Viz Media
- Imprint: Jump Comics+
- Magazine: Shōnen Jump+
- Original run: July 14, 2023 – August 22, 2025
- Volumes: 7

Wild Strawberry (ワイルドストロベリー, Wairudo Sutoroberī) is a Japanese manga series written and illustrated by Ire Yonemoto. It was serialized on Shueisha's Shōnen Jump+ manga service from July 2023 to August 2025.

== Publication ==
Written and illustrated by Ire Yonemoto, Wild Strawberry was serialized on Shueisha's Shōnen Jump+ manga service from July 14, 2023, to August 22, 2025. Its chapters were collected in seven tankōbon volumes released from November 2, 2023, to September 4, 2025.

The series is published in English on Shueisha's Manga Plus app. In May 2024, Viz Media announced that they licensed the series for English digital publication.

No.	Original release date	Original ISBN	North American release date	North American ISBN
1	November 2, 2023	978-4-08-883766-6	November 26, 2024	978-1-9747-4717-7
2	February 2, 2024	978-4-08-883825-0	February 25, 2025	978-1-9747-5381-9
3	June 4, 2024	978-4-08-884110-6	May 27, 2025	978-1-9747-5659-9
4	October 4, 2024	978-4-08-884229-5	August 26, 2025	978-1-9747-6270-5
5	February 4, 2025	978-4-08-884371-1	November 25, 2025	978-1-9747-6271-2
6	June 4, 2025	978-4-08-884597-5	February 24, 2026	978-1-9747-1696-8
7	September 4, 2025	978-4-08-884671-2	May 26, 2026	978-1-9747-6889-9
