= Aliens Area =

Japanese manga series

- Cover of the first tankōbon volume
- Genre: Action; Fantasy
- Manga
- Written by: Fusai Naba
- Published by: Shueisha
- English publisher: NA: Viz Media
- Imprint: Jump Comics
- Magazine: Weekly Shōnen Jump
- Original run: June 6, 2022 – October 24, 2022
- Volumes: 3
- icon

Aliens Area (stylized in all caps) is a Japanese manga series written and illustrated by Fusai Naba. It was serialized in Shueisha's Weekly Shōnen Jump magazine from June to October 2022, with its chapters collected into three tankōbon volumes.

== Plot ==
High schooler Tatsumi Tatsunami lost his parents at a young age and now works multiple part-time jobs to support himself and his younger siblings. However, it turns out his right arm holds a very powerful piece of alien technology, and other aliens want it. However, after being saved by the strange man, Hajime Sharaku, Tatsunami is offered the chance of a lifetime: to work with him at Section 5 of the Foreign Affairs Division and help protect earth from extra terrestrial threats. To support his sibling, Tatsumi takes it, starting his adventure.

== Characters ==
Tatsumi Tatsunami
One of the main protagonists. He lost his parents in a fire and needs to work multiple part-time jobs to support his siblings. In his right arm holds an advanced form of alien technology, which allows him to change and alter his arm's shape.
Hajime Sharaku
One of the main protagonists. He is an investigator for Section 5. He has a cane that doubles as a taser, and a wrist brace that grants him anti-gravity abilities.

== Publication ==
Written and illustrated by Fusai Naba, the series was serialized in Shueisha's Weekly Shōnen Jump magazine from June 6 to October 24, 2022. Three tankōbon volumes were published from October 4, 2022, to February 3, 2023.

Viz Media and Manga Plus are publishing chapters of the series in English simultaneously with their Japanese release.

=== Volumes ===
No.	Original release date	Original ISBN	English release date	English ISBN
1	October 4, 2022	978-4-08-883257-9	January 23, 2024	978-1-9747-3830-4
1. "Tatsumi Tatsunami" (立浪辰己, Tatsunami Tatsumi); 2. "Hajime Sharaku" (写楽一, Sharaku Hajime); 3. "Section 5, Foreign Affairs Division, Public Security Bureau, Police Department" (警視庁公安部外事第五課, Keishichō Kōan Bugaiji Daigoka); 4. "The Plot" (企み, Takurami); 5. "Exile" (亡命, Bōmei); 6. "Gnaw Gnaw" (がじがじ, Gaji Gaji); 7. "Equipment 2" (第二兵装, Daini Heisō)
2	February 3, 2023	978-4-08-883393-4	January 23, 2024	978-1-9747-4450-3
8. "It's So Hot" (あっちいな, Acchiina); 9. "Break the Silence!" (破れ...！ 沈黙！の巻, Yabure...! Chinmoku! no Maki); 10. "Convenient Space Goods" (宇宙の便利グッズ, Uchū no Benri Guzzu); 11. "You Can See Me?!" (拙者の姿が見えるのか...！？, Sessha no Sugata ga Mieru no ka...!?); 12. "Akabane, Kita Ward, Tokyo" (東京都北区赤羽, Tōkyō-to Kita-ku Akabane); 13. "Night, Burning, Akabane" (夜、燃える、赤羽, Yoru, Moeru, Akabane); 14. "Light My Fire"; 15. "All Hands on Deck! It's Time For a Meeting!" (会議だヨ！全員集合！, Kaigi da yo! Zen'in Shūgō!)
3	February 3, 2023	978-4-08-883394-1	January 23, 2024	978-1-9747-4451-0
16. "Too Many Cooks Spoil the Broth!" (役人多くして事絶えず, Yakunin Ōkushite Koto Taezu); 17. "The Summons" (召喚, Shōkan); 18. "Ahimsa, Antinomie"; 19. "Broken Windows Theory (Graduation)" (Broken Windows Theory（あるいは、卒業）, Burōkun Windōzu Seorī (Aruiwa, Sotsugyō)); 20. "Laugh, Cry... The End of Youth" (笑う、苦く、それが青春の終わり, Warau, Nigaku, Sore ga Seishun no Owari)

== Reception ==
Despite that, he offered praise to the overall premise Shonen Jump canceled Aliens Area early.

== Also See ==
- Kyokuto Necromance, another series written by Fusai Naba
