= Ultimate Exorcist Kiyoshi =

Japanese manga series

- First tankōbon volume cover, featuring Kiyoshi Harai

悪祓士(エクソシスト)のキヨシくん (Ekusoshisuto no Kiyoshi-kun)
- Genre: Action; Comedy
- Manga
- Written by: Shōichi Usui
- Published by: Shueisha
- English publisher: NA: Viz Media
- Imprint: Jump Comics
- Magazine: Weekly Shōnen Jump
- Original run: June 24, 2024 – present
- Volumes: 10
- icon

Ultimate Exorcist Kiyoshi (Japanese: 悪祓士(エクソシスト)のキヨシくん, Hepburn: Ekusoshisuto no Kiyoshi-kun) is a Japanese manga series written and illustrated by Shōichi Usui. It began serialization in Shueisha's Weekly Shōnen Jump magazine in June 2024, with its chapters collected in ten volumes as of October 2026.

== Plot ==
After losing his parents at the hands of demons at a young age, Kiyoshi Harai set out to become an exorcist capable of protecting many people. The youngest exorcist to graduate from the Exorcist Academy, and valedictorian of his class, Kiyoshi is the strongest exorcist ever. However, even he had a weakness: extreme shyness and introversion. He is assigned to work at the Naraku City Exorcist Association Branch Outpost, inside the Chinese restaurant Gates of Hell, where his life-saving mentor, Sakaki Tenma, is stationed. Alongside his peers, Kiyoshi fights to exorcise demons and become a shield protecting the weak.

== Characters ==
=== Main ===
Kiyoshi Harai (祓 清, Harai Kiyoshi)
The main protagonist of the series. Although he is shy and somewhat naïve, he is an incredibly powerful exorcist with many calling him "The Ultimate Exorcist". He has a list of 100 things to do in high school. He is assigned to the Naraku Branch, run by Tenma Sasaki, and works at his restaurant where he makes omurice. His exorcism techniques are based on the Sun and Moon.
Sosuke Hitsugi (棺 葬介, Hitsugi Sōsuke)
Kiyoshi's self proclaimed rival, and a member of the Knights of Light. Although he tries to act like a stereotypical gifted and cold character, he is caring and hard-working. He carries a special gun that converts moisture in the air into holy water bullets. Recently, he has started to use water-based exorcism techniques.
Tenma Sakaki (熾木 天馬, Sakaki Tenma)
A laid-back exorcist and the leader of the Naraku Branch. He runs the Gates of Hell, which is a chūka ryōriya restaurant that specializes in Chinese cuisine. He is a former Cross Paladin. He has a demon familiar called "Hi-Stakes" which can transform into different weapons based on a roll of dice.
Akari Jogasaki (浄ヶ崎 悪狩, Jōgasaki Akari)
Kiyoshi's peppy partner. Although she is not skilled in combat, she always does her best to help. She has a unique ability to sense demons using the strand of hair on her head.
Nehan Sanzugawa (三途川 涅槃, Sanzugawa Nehan)
Kiyoshi's classmate in high school and a new member of the Naraku Branch. Originally an ordinary human, Nehan joined the Naraku Branch with his demon friend, Jack Joe as his familiar. They can combine into a powerful human/demon hybrid.
Jack Joe (ジャック = ジョー, Jakku Jō)
A demon that Nehan befriended when they were kids. He is friendly and kind, contrary to most demons. He has amnesia, which caused him to forget his memories as a Demon Lord.

=== Other exorcists ===
==== Concordia/Knights of Light ====
Tsurugi Hijiri (聖 剣, Hijiri Tsurugi)
The deputy commander of Concordia, the Knights of Light. He is cold-hearted and ruthless in battle. He uses sword-based exorcism techniques.
Mako Kusakari (鎖刈 魔子, Kusakari Mako)
A member of Concordia and a friend of Sosuke. She acts like a delinquent. She has an artificial leg made of Cross Armor.
Wincheser Matagi (叉木 ウィンチェスター, Matagi Winchesutā)
A calm and collected member of Concordia. He uses a special gun to snipe demons.
Karuta Jogasaki (浄ヶ崎 狩堕, Jōgasaki Karuta)
A member of Concordia and the older brother of Akari. He uses lightning-based exorcism techniques.

==== Sanguis/Iron-Blooded Knights ====
Kyoka Kurogane (黒鐘 凶華, Kurogane Kyōka)
The commander of Sanguis, the Iron-Blooded Knights. She is seductive and bold. She has a contract with an angel. Her exorcism techniques revolve around a giant bell she conjures and a tiger familiar.
Yohko Ono (斧 妖枯, Ono Yōko)
A deputy commander of Sanguis. She is sensitive about her short size, and will attack anyone who mentions it. She wields a large axe as her weapon of choice.
Iwao Tatejima (盾島 巌, Tatejima Iwao)
A deputy commander of the Iron-Blooded Knights. He states the obvious very proudly. He carries a pair of Cross Armor shields.

==== Demon Realm Special Forces ====
Goro Shishido (死屍戸五郎)
The leader of the Demon Realm Special Forces. Despite his "punk" appearance, he is a friendly and caring guy who protects both humans and demons. He loves idols. His Creast XR-Cism allows him to consume materials and project them for attacks (Example: Eating spicy food grants him fire breathing abilities).
Toji Shuten (酒吞祷児)
A member of the Deamon Realm Special Forces. He is a Cambion, and can manipulate demonic flames.
Zangi Tosaka (戸坂残義)
A recently recruited member, and a former member of Deep Green Knights. He hopes to become a Grand Cross in memory for his best friend Kazami, who was killed by a demon lord. He can summon a Exorcist Bird familiar named Cook (クック), who resembles a chicken but acts like a dog.

==== Exorcist Academy ====
Takeru Kitano
The Chairman of the Exorcist Association and headmaster of the Exorcist Academy. He is a former Cross Paladin.
Manabu Goto
The principal of the Exorcist Academy. He claims to be a friend of Chairman Kitano, but disliked Kitano's hairstyle and stinginess.
Jubei Yagi
Yagi, a large bearded man who Akari mistakes as an ape-man, is a professor who can transform into animals. The real Yagi was killed by Iefuda, who assumed his likeness.
Hanto Tsuge
Tsuge has a patchwork appearance like Frankenstein's monster; he is physically weak.
Daichi Kitano
The grandson of the Chairman, Daichi is a third-year student notorious for performing unlicensed exorcisms as the leader of the Devil Clash Boyz, a gang of delinquent exorcists, which include three students nicknamed 2-Seam, Azuma, and South Park.
Metsuko Kaburagi
One of the top students of the Exorcist Academy, a third-year student in Class 3-A. Because she was saved by Sosuke Hitsugi during an emergency at the Academy, she admires him. Conversely, she is scornful of Daichi, as he does not live up to his potential.
Jampero
The janitor's dog, who is the sole witness of the stabbing of Chairman Kitano.
Inori Iefuda
A gifted Exorcist Academy student whose disappearance was blamed on the Phantom of the Exorcist Academy, who is one of the Seven Mysteries of the Academy. Iefuda opened a cult hole when he was in elementary school. His XR-cism technique allows him to take on the physical appearance of anyone he kills. His first victim was a student named Shimon.
Mr. Shimon
A cheerful student at the Exorcist Academy who was murdered by Iefuda; Shimon's ghost became the Phantom. Shimon's identity was taken by Iefuda; although there is a record that Shimon graduated, the graduate was Iefuda (as Shimon) after Iefuda's mysterious disappearance. "Shimon" later died in the line of duty and Iefuda took on Yagi's identity.

=== Demons ===
Yamada (病魔田)
A demon that Kiyoshi meets on his first exorcism job. Despite being a demon, he prefers to enjoy a simple life with his family. He befriends Kiyoshi, who spares him so he can go home to his family.
Asuta Roth (明日喰ロト)
A great demon lord and the main antagonist of the Black Parade Saga. He enjoys fighting, and treats the opponents that impress him as crushes. He is the leader of a group of demon lords called The Thirteen Club.
Helze Bub (地獄瀬ブブ)
A great demon lord. Unlike Asuta Roth, he is more laid-back and friendly. He is friends with Goro Shishido, and shares his love of idols.
Helze Gaga (地獄瀬ガガ)
One of Helze Bub's children. He is able to replicate special abilities after seeing them in action once, earning him the nickname "Genius Demon".
Helza Lulu (地獄瀬ルル)
One of Helze Bub's children. She has the ability to control plants and insects after injecting them with special poison from her hair. She cares for her siblings, but she shows it through violence.
Helze Bobo (地獄瀬ボボ)
Helze Bub's oldest son, and the most ruthless. He has the ability to manipulate black lightning, and lend other demons his demonic power and then take it back with "Interest".

== Publication ==
Written and illustrated by Shōichi Usui, the series began serialization in Shueisha's Weekly Shōnen Jump magazine on June 24, 2024. As of October 2026, the series' individual chapters have been collected into ten tankōbon volumes.

Viz Media and Manga Plus are publishing the series in English simultaneously with its Japanese release.

=== Volumes ===
No.	Original release date	Original ISBN	English release date	English ISBN
1	November 1, 2024	978-4-08-884323-0	May 5, 2026	978-1-9747-5564-6
1. "The Exorcist Kiyoshi Harai" (悪祓士の祓清, Waru Fú Shi no Fú Se); 2. "Maybe I'll Make a Bunch of Friends!" (友達いっぱいできるかな, Tomodachi Ippai Dekiru ka na); 3. "Gates of Hell Chinese Restaurant" (中華飯店地獄門, Chūka Janten Jigoku-mon); 4. "Kiyoshi and Akari" (キヨシくんとアカリさん, Kiyoshi-kun to Akari-san); 5. "Kiyoshi the High Schooler" (高校生のキヨシくん, Kōkōsei no Kiyoshi-kun); 6. "Nehan & Jack Joe" (ネハンとジャック = ジョー, Nehan to Jakku-Jō); 7. "Cross Paladin" (最高位悪祓士, Saikō-i Akuhara-shi); 8. "Savior" (命の恩人, Inochi no Onjin)
During his first trial assignment, 16-year-old genius exorcist Kiyoshi Harai discovers he has a phobia of demons; he decided to become an exorcist and protect lives because he was orphaned as a child in a demon attack. The sympathetic demon Yamada coaches him through his anxiety and Kiyoshi frees him to return to his home, but they are interrupted by Demon Lord Meto; Kiyoshi exorcises Lord Meto while protecting Yamada. He oversleeps his graduation ceremony, disappointing fellow student Sosuke Hitsugi, who sees Kiyoshi as a rival, but arrives in time to exorcise Demon Lord Sata, bent on revenge. Kiyoshi is assigned to distant Naraku City to serve under Tenma Sakaki, who saved him when he was a child; Sakaki runs the Gates of Hell Chinese restaurant there with Diego, a part-timer, and Akari Jogasaki, an underachieving exorcist taking college classes. Because of his youth, Sakaki enrolls Kiyoshi in high school, where he makes his first friend, Nehan Sanzugawa. Nehan's imaginary best friend Jack Joe is an amnesiac demon who panics when he learns Kiyoshi is an exorcist, but Yamada's example showed Kiyoshi that kind demons exist. Exorcists from Concordia, including Sosuke and Tsurugi Hijiri, arrive to battle Jack Joe, who is one of the thirteen Demon Lords, but Kiyoshi defends him and Nehan. Jack Joe takes a mortal blow from Tsurugi meant for Kiyoshi; Sakaki arrives to sort out the chaos, and Nehan enters a contract with Jack Joe, saving his life.
2	February 4, 2025	978-4-08-884394-0	July 21, 2026	978-1-9747-6491-4
9. "Determined Kyoshi" (決意のキヨシ, Ketsui no Kyoshi); 10. "Let's Go Bowling" (ボウリングにいこう, Bōringu ni Ikou); 11. "The Exorcist Sosuke" (悪祓士のソウスケくん, Akuhara-shi no Sōsuke-kun); 12. "The GC Test" (亜級試験, A-kyū Shiken); 13. "Battling in Memento Forest" (メメント森の戦い, Memento Mori no Tatakai); 14. "The Ferocious Beast of Memento Forest" (メメント森の凶獣, Memento Mori no Kyō-jū); 15. "The Final Test" (最終試験, Saishū Shiken); 16. "GC Material" (亜級の器, A-kyū no Utsuwa); 17. "Grand Cross" (亜級悪祓士, A-kyū Akuhara-shi)
Kiyoshi vows to become a Cross Paladin, the highest exorcist rank, demonstrating he can protect everything; at school, he checks off multiple social achievements after Nehan invites him to bowl with friends. At the bowling center, he exorcises a demon-possessed schoolmate. Sosuke takes the Grand Cross rank test with his friend/rival Kiyoshi; for the second phase, they are teamed up with Zangi Tosaka, an older candidate who has failed the test nine years in a row. The trio manage to tame the Ferocious Beast of Memento Forest, despite treachery from other candidates. In the third phase, they spar with famed Grand Crosses; when Tosaka is defeated through deceit, Kiyoshi takes on old man Yana, who declares that he failed Tosaka because of his ignoble birth. Incensed, Kiyoshi beats Yana and says he wants nothing to do with the Grand Cross if Yana's arrogance is typical.
3	May 2, 2025	978-4-08-884511-1	September 1, 2026	978-1-9747-1654-8
18. "The Naraku High School Occult Investigation Club" (奈落高校オカルト研究部, Naraku Kōkō Okaruto Kenkyū-bu); 19. "Sakaki vs. Yuda" (熾木と幽田, Oki ki to Kasoke ta); 20. "The Great Demon Lord's Descent" (大魔王降臨, Dai Maō Kōrin); 21. "Kyoshi and the Great Demon Lord" (キヨシくんと大魔王, Kiyoshi-kun to Dai Maō); 22. "Asuta Roth" (明日喰ロト, Ashita Cān Roto); 23. "Kiyoshi's Tears" (キヨシくんの涙, Kiyoshi-kun no Namida); 24. "Let's Go to the Hot Spring" (温泉に行こう, Onsen Niikō); 25. "Let's Play Precept Power Ping-Pong" (Let's戒力ピンポン, Let's Kairiki Pinpon); 26. "A Hot Spring Promise" (温泉の約束, Onsen no Yakusoku)
Sakaki goes on a long-delayed vacation, meeting wayward exorcist Yuda at a cafe; Yuda, who sold his soul, was responsible for the spate of demon summonings in Naraku City. Kiyoshi is pressured to join the school occult investigation club, which inadvertently summon the Great Demon Lord Asuta Roth. Roth and Kiyoshi's struggle is punctuated by the Demon Lord's attempt to use Kiyoshi's childhood memories against him, but he rallies and fights back. Roth is amused, calling Kiyoshi his soulmate and vowing to see him again during the coming Black Parade before returning to the demon realm. After three days, Kiyoshi wakes up and Sakaki explains that during the prior Black Parade, demons overrun the human realm, massacring 200,000 people. To speed his recovery, the team go to the Exorcist Association's Goma hot spring where they meet Tsurugi's squad and strategize for the upcoming battle. Sakaki and Akari tutor Kiyoshi in rationing his precept power using specialized ping-pong equipment; Nehan and Jack Joe convince Tsurugi to teach them to fight.
4	July 4, 2025	978-4-08-884567-8	November 3, 2026	978-1-9747-1655-5
27. "Kiyoshi and Sakaki's Training Time" (キヨシとサカキの修行週間, Kiyoshi to Sakaki no Shugyō Shūkan); 28. "The Prince on a White Horse at the Gates of Hell" (白馬の王子様in地獄門, Hakuba no Ōjisama in Jigoku-mon); 29. "June 6, 2 a.m." (6月6日の午前2時, 6 Tsuki 6-nichi no Gozen 2-ji); 30. "Welcome to the Black Parade"; 31. "The Demon Lords Take the Field" (魔王参戦, Maō Sansen); 32. "The Fifth Demon Lord, Bakku Yoraku" (第5魔王ヨラク = バック, Dai 5 Maō Yoraku-Bakku); 33. "Fight, Nehan & JJ!" (戦えネハンとJJ, Tatakae Nehan to JJ); 34. "Jack Joe's Past" (ジャック = ジョーの過去, Jakku-Jō no Kako); 35. "See You Later" (またね, Mata Ne)
To finish his training, Kiyoshi spars with Sakaki, who says near-death battles will strengthen him faster. After a week, they return to Naraku City, where Kyoka Kurogane, the commander of Sanguis, drops by the Gates of Hell and flirts with Kiyoshi. The date for the Black Parade is set for June 6, with the cult hole portal scheduled to open at 2 a.m.; to prepare, a storm is announced the night before, convincing the citizens to lock up their houses, and Sakaki sets a pentagram barrier to exclude low-level demons. Kurogane wastes little time in dispatching the 13th Demon Lord, Mouroku, then faces off with the 4th, Gorgon Mede. Sanguis tackle the 5th, Yoraku Bakku, who proves too fast for them, but Akari, Nehan, and Jack Joe save them from disaster; Yoraku Bakku and Jack Joe were longtime frenemies who separated after Jack Joe decided to live among humans. After defeating Yoraku Bakku, Jack Joe lets his old friend return to the demon realm. The 6th Lord, Hydrako, sets a trap for Kiyoshi.
5	September 4, 2025	978-4-08-884657-6	January 5, 2027	978-1-9747-6660-4
36. "The Sixth Demon Lord, Hydrako" (第6魔王 悲龍子, Dai 6 Maō Bēi Ryūko); 37. "Baby Driver" (ベイビードライバー, Beibī Doraibā); 38. "The Fourth Demon Lord, Gorgon Mede" (第4魔王 滅出ゴルゴン, Dai 4 Maō Metsu de Gorugon); 39. "The First Demon Lord, Tonjinchi" (第1魔王 貪瞋痴, Dai 1 Maō Donjinchi); 40. "Leave It to Me" (オレに任せろ, Ore ni Makasero); 41. "Sosuke Hitsugi's Dream" (棺葬介の夢, Hitsugi-sō Kai no Yume); 42. "Thriving on the Razor's Edge" (死中の活, Shichū no Katsu); 43. "Asuta Roth Vs. Kyoka Kurogane" (明日喰ロトVS黒鐘凶華, Ashita cān Roto VS Kurogane Kyō Hana); 44. "Clash" (衝突, Shōtotsu)
Kiyoshi faces off with Hydrako, who is head over heels in love with Roth; he prevails, but her poison attacks turn him into a baby. Sosuke treats baby Kiyoshi and protects him while he recovers. The 2nd lord, Mukurojima, summons the 9th and 10th (Agashi and Ungashi), but they are no match for Sakaki. Kyoka is drawn into Gorgon Mede's nightmare eye, but the fearless Kyoka turns the tables and the 4th lord falls. The 1st, Tonjinchi, beats down lesser exorcists and Concordia, but Nehan and Jack Joe delay him until Hijiri arrives and they continue their fight at a mountain temple. Sosuke takes on the 3rd, Kurose Sata, as Asuta Roth descends to earth seeking Kiyoshi. As Sata starts to overwhelm Sosuke, he recalls his mother's final words and escapes, pitting boiling-hot water against Sata's ice and prevailing in the end. Kyoka reaches Roth first; she is defeated and caught by Kiyoshi. Elated, Roth and Kiyoshi withdraw to an amusement park for their duel.
6	November 4, 2025	978-4-08-884746-7	—	—
45. "Tsurugi Hijiri vs. The First Demon Lord, Tonjinchi" (聖剣VS第1魔王貪瞋痴, Seiken VS Dai 1 Maō Donjinchi); 46. "Things Only a Cross Paladin Can See" (見える景色, Mieru Keshiki); 47. "The Final Battle in Naraku City" (頂上決戦in奈落市, Chōjō Kessen in Naraku-shi); 48. "The Gambler's Creed" (博徒の心得, Bakuto no Kokoroe); 49. "Yuda & The Sister" (幽田とシスター, Kasoke ta to Shisutā); 50. "Mr. Sakaki the Exorcist" (悪祓土のサカキさん, Akuhara Tsuchi no Sakaki-san); 51. "Sakaki & Yuda" (熾木と幽田, Oki ki to Kasoke ta); 52. "Roth's True Worth" (ロトの真価, Roto no Shinka); 53. "Favourite Worst Nightmare"
Tonjinchi gains the upper hand against Hijiri, but the Cross Paladin refuses to yield; as a last-ditch effort, he pulls out Arthur's Cross and defeats the demon lord. Yuda and Mukurojima renew their battle with Sakaki, who has an unlucky roll and loses his precept power temporarily. After dodging several fierce blows, Sakaki's power returns and he rolls triple fours. Yuda's backstory is revealed: he was an orphaned child who closed his heart to everyone except Sister Ryoko Kito, another orphan who chose to help others as an adult. When he graduated, Yuda was assigned to Concordia as Sakaki's partner, but he grew increasingly cynical and weary of the sins of the world and finally snaps after Ryoko is murdered. In the present, Sakaki tries to convince him to return, but Yuda has sold his soul and becomes a demon; Sakaki cannot bear to kill Yuda, who blasts through him. As Mukurojima gloats, Yuda returns to defend Sakaki from the demon lord and ultimately sacrifices himself to resurrect Sakaki, dying as a human. Kiyoshi fights Roth; the demon is excited to feel pain again as their stalemate continues. Eventually, Kiyoshi's ultimate attack fails and as Roth is about to deliver the final blow, Akari arrives to defend Kiyoshi.
7	February 4, 2026	978-4-08-884834-1	—	—
54. "Kiyoshi's Partner" (キヨシ君の相棒, Kiyoshi-kun no Aibō); 55. "Roth's Confession" (ロトの告白, Roto no Kokuhaku); 56. "Naraku City at Dawn" (夜明けの奈落市, Yoake no Naraku-shi); 57. "The Black Parade — Finale —" (悪魔の狂想曲 ―終幕―, Akuma no Kyōsōkyoku ― Shūmaku ―); 58. "The Baton to be Passed On" (託されるバトン, Takusa Reru Baton); 59. "Cross Paladins Unite" (最高位悪祓土 集結, Saikō-i Akuhara-do Shūketsu); 60. "Let's Stay at Hitsugi's House" (棺さん家に泊まろう, Hitsugi-san-ka ni Tomarou); 61. "Exorcist Reunion" (再開の悪祓土, Saikai no Akuhara Tsuchi); 62. "Let's Go to the Demon Realm" (魔界へいこう, Makai e Ikou)
Roth calls Kiyoshi a cheater when Akari says she is his partner and heals his wounds. Roth declares victory, but Kiyoshi draws on his fierce desire to protect everyone and defeats the demon lord; as he fades, Kiyoshi says he will never forget him. Spent, Kiyoshi collapses in Akari's arms. After he wakes up, the exorcists celebrate at Gates of Hell; Kiyoshi finds both Kyoka and Akari's brother have warmed to him as a suitable match. Returning to school, Kiyoshi enjoys the sports festival and his class wins; Kyoka decides to resign so she can retrain with her squad and recommends Kiyoshi as her successor to head Sanguis. The five Cross Paladins meet to vote: Sanguis's Kyoka Kurogane, Caelum's Megumi Tenno, and Concordia's Tsurugi Hijiri; two are absent (Utsugi Hijiri and Goro Shishido) and they vote 2-1 to promote Kiyoshi. Utsugi arrives late and votes against, leaving the missing Shishido as the tiebreaker. Kiyoshi goes to Hitsugi Hospital to recover his precept power; because there are no free beds, he stays with the Hitsugi family. After three weeks of rest, Sosuke and Kiyoshi return to the Gates of Hell, where Sakaki introduces the pair to their next mission: Mr. Tosaka and Toji Shuten, one of the examiners from the Grand Cross test, ask them to find Goro Shishido, who has gone missing in the Demon Realm. Shuten recites three rules they must follow: don't draw attention to yourself, don't leave anything behind, and don't get involved in local issues; as soon as they enter, Kiyoshi breaks all three by defending a demon child.
8	May 1, 2026	978-4-08-885039-9	—	—
63. "Everyone's Favorite Burger from Wickie-D's" (みんな大好き 魔苦怒バーガー, Min'na Daisuki ma Niga Ika Bāgā); 64. "The Cross Paladin Goro Shishido" (最高位悪祓土 死屍戸五郎, Saikō-i Akuhara-do Shishi to Gorō); 65. "Goro Shishido vs. Helze Gaga" (死屍戸五郎VS地獄瀬ガガ, Shishi to Gorō VS Jigoku se Gaga); 66. "A Friend in the Demon Realm" (魔界の友人, Makai no Yūjin); 67. "The Great Race to Retake the Demon Lord's Castle" (魔王城奪還大レース, Maō-jō Dakkan Dai Rēsu); 68. "The Great Demon Lord Helze Bub" (大魔王 地獄瀬ブブ, Dai Maō Jigoku se Bubu); 69. "Eve of the Showdown" (決戦前夜, Kessen Zen'ya); 70. "Kiyoshi in the Demon Realm Is Like a Moth to a Flame" (飛んで火に入る魔界のキヨシ, Tonde Hiniiru Makai no Kiyoshi); 71. "One Kiyoshi Against One Thousand" (一清当選, Issei Tōsen)
Cook helps the squad look for Shishido; they stop for lunch at Wickie-D's, where they enjoy the spicy burgers and learn that Shishido has been captured and sentenced to death. At the execution, demon lord Helze Gaga (son of great lord Helze Bub) insults Shishido for his otaku obsession with the idol Nononon and he breaks free, blasting Gaga with flames. Shishido swallows Gaga's attacks and returns them with amplified power, overwhelming the demon, and Gaga escapes with the help of his sister, surviving an attack from Shuten, a demon-human hybrid. Gaga and his two siblings, Bobo and Lulu, are plotting to massacre all the low and mid-level demons in Roth's former realm, so the squad collectively decide to protect them. As a test, Kiyoshi and Sosuke race the special forces led by Shishido to the throne room of Helze Bub's castle; when the great demon lord appears, he welcomes Shishido as his close friend and asks for their help to stop his children and protect the balance between the human and demon worlds. Bub will tackle Bobo, while the exorcists will attack Lulu's castle, where Gaga is healing. When the squad break into the castle, they learn that Gaga has already left with his army, so Shishido stays behind to fight Lulu and the others pursue Gaga and his forces. Kiyoshi rescues Hydrako and defends his demon friend Yamada, but he is still recovering from his fight with Roth and can use his precept power for only three minutes per day.
9	August 4, 2026	978-4-08-885137-2	—	—
72. "Kiyoshi in the Yamada Household" (キヨシ in 病魔田ハウス, Kiyoshi in Byōma ta Hausu); 73. "Goro Shishido vs. Helze Lulu" (死屍戸五郎 VS 地獄瀬ルル, Shishi to Gorō VS Jigoku Sera Ruru); 74. "A Bouquet, With Love" (愛を込めて花束を, Aiwokomete Hanataba o); 75. "The Eldest Son, Helze Bobo" (長男 地獄瀬ボボ, Chōnan Jigoku se Bobo); 76. "Toji Shuten vs. Helze Gaga" (酒吞祷児 VS 地獄瀬ガガ, Shuten Toji VS Jigoku se Gaga); 77. "The Demon Realm Special Forces #2: Shuten Toji" (魔界特師団No.2 酒吞祷児, Makai Toku Shidan No. 2 Shuten Toji); 78. "Ask Not the Sparrow How the Eagle Soars" (燕雀安んぞ鴻鵠の志を知らんや, Enjakuizukunzokōkokunokokorozashiwoshiran'ya); 79. "Zangi Tosaka & Cook vs. the Demon Lord Neko" (戸坂残義&クックVS魔王廻殺, Tosaka Zan Yoshi & Kukku VS Maō Mawari ya); 80. "Mr. Tosaka, the Exorcist" (悪祓士のトサカさん, Akuhara-shi no Tosaka-san)
Kiyoshi is rescued by the Yamada family and the remainder of the squad hold off Gaga's army. Lulu poisons Shishido, but he belches it out and recovers, then lectures her that love and peace outweigh domination; he returns the pain she has caused but spares her life, leaving her confused and grateful. Bub arrives at Bobo's castle; despite Bub's still-formidable strength, Bobo is unfazed. Shuten fights Gaga, a skilled mimic; Shuten knocks Gaga unconscious with a series of attacks climaxing with a mighty forehead flick, but the demon rises, having learned Shuten's moves. Gaga destroys Shuten's right arm and invites Shuten to serve him; a flashback shows how Shuten once tried to betray Shishido and he refuses the offer. Sosuke rescues Shuten, taking on Bobo with blows and insults. As Kiyoshi recovers at the Yamadas, Neko, the former Eighth Demon Lord, faces off with Tosaka and Cook, assisted by Hydrako. Neko had killed Kazami, Tosaka's first partner, and is surprised by Tosaka's dedication and strength, but the former Demon Lord imprisons Hydrako and overwhelms Tosaka and Cook. While the Yamadas spirit Kiyoshi away, Tosaka attempts but fails to delay Neko; mortally wounded, he tasks Cook with maintaining the defense. The bird transforms into a phoenix, resurrecting Tosaka and together they defeat Neko.
10	October 2, 2026	978-4-08-885204-1	—	—
81. "Returning Exorcist Kiyoshi" (復活のキヨシくん, Fukkatsu no Kiyoshi-kun); 82. "Sosuke Hitsugi vs. Helze Gaga" (棺葬介VS地獄瀬ガガ, Hitsugi Sosuke VS Jigoku se Gaga); 83. "Bring on the Demons" (悪魔上等, Akuma Jōtō); 84. "Goro Shishido vs. Helze Bobo" (死屍戸五郎 VS 地獄瀬ボボ, Shishido Gorō VS Jigoku se Bobo); 85. "The Great Demon Lord Helze Bobo" (大魔王 地獄瀬ボボ, Dai Maō Jigoku se Bobo); 86. "Encounter" (邂逅, Kaigō); 87. "Black Back" (悪魔の闇金, Akuma no Yamikin); 88. "Kiyoshi Harai vs. Helze Bobo" (祓清 VS 地獄瀬ボボ, Kiyoshi Harai VS Jigoku Se Bobo); 89. "Going Under"
Karuba Ross arrives, bent on killing Kiyoshi, but he has fully recovered and defeats Karuba. Sosuke uses supercritical holy water to block Gaga's power pathways. They continue with a fistfight, which Sosuke wins with a headbutt. Shishido arrives at Bobo's castle, guided by Lulu; Shishido hits Bobo with a fierce attack but he recovers and punches a hole through Bub, seizing the Great Demon Lord's crown, then defeats Shishido. When Bobo arrives in Roth's territory, Kiyoshi deflects his wild black lightning strikes. Sosuke and Shuten arrive to help Shishido, who says they need to help Kiyoshi. Bobo reveals his secret: he made usurious loans of daemonic power to a thousand top-level demons, and is calling in the debts to recover and power up his attacks. Kiyoshi vows to keep exorcising Bobo until his stores are exhausted. In a flashback, Bub asked Kiyoshi to save Bobo. Kiyoshi wears down Bobo, who recklessly draws on 300 debts simultaneously to power up; however, Kiyoshi traps the renegade demon lord using Fiat Lux and blasts him with Omega Stella.

=== Chapters not yet in tankōbon format ===
These chapters have yet to be published in a tankōbon volume.

90. "Memories of Mama" (ママの思い出, Mama no Omoide)
91. "Final Showdown in the Demon Realm" (頂上決戦in魔界, Chōjō Kessen in Makai)
92. "Back in Black"
93. "Ultimate Demon Realm Kiyoshi" (魔界のキヨシくん, Makai no Kiyoshi-kun)
94. "The Exorcist Mr. Shishido" (悪祓士のシシドさん, Akuhara-shi no Shishido-san)
95. "A New Trial" (新たなる試練, Aratanaru Shiren)
96. "Ultimate Test Taker Kiyoshi" (期末試験のキヨシくん, Kimatsu Shiken no Kiyoshi-kun)
97. "Let's Go to an Inauguration" (就任式にいこう, Shūnin-shiki ni Ikou)
98. "Ultimate Cross Paladin Kiyoshi" (最高位悪祓士のキヨシくん, Saikō-i Akuhara-shi no Kiyoshi-kun)
99. "Newborn Cross Paladin" (新生最高位悪祓士, Shinsei Saikō-i Akuhara-shi)
100. "Kiyoshi & His Grandma" (キヨシくんとおばあちゃん, Kiyoshi-kun to o Bāchan)
101. "A Tale of Old" (昔話, Mukashi-banashi)
102. "Grandchild and Grandmother" (孫と祖母, Mago to Sobo)
103. "Your Continued Support" (よろしくお願いします, Yoro Shikuonegai Shimasu)
104. "Let's Go to the Exorcist Academy" (悪祓学校にいこう, Akuhara Gakkō ni Ikou)
105. DCB (Devil Clash Boyz)
106. "Three Suspects" (3人の容疑者, 3-Ri no Yōgi-shi)
107. "The Phantom of the Exorcist Academy" (悪祓座の怪人, Akuhara-za no Kaijin)
108. "Let's Chat with a Ghost" (幽霊と話そう, Yūrei to Hanasou)
109. "The Culprit is You" (犯人はお前だ, Han'nin wa Omaeda)
110. "The Fight at the Exorcist Academy" (悪祓学校の戦い, Akuhara Gakkō no Tatakai)
111. "The Hope of the Exorcist Academy" (悪祓学校の希望, Akuhara Gakkō no Kibō)
112. "Uninvited Guest" (招かれざる客, Manekarezarukyaku)
113. "A Child Never Knows How Much His Parents Care" (親の心子知らず, Oya no Shinko Shirazu)
114. "Kiyoshi Harai vs. Kunikara Kitano" (祓清VS忌多野國伽羅, Harai Kiyoshi VS Kitano Kunikara)
115. "Reunion" (再会, Saikai)
116. "The Dark Knight" (黒ノ悪祓士, Kuro no Akuhara-shi)
117. "The Future"

== Reception ==
The series was recommended by manga artist Eiichiro Oda, the author of One Piece, which Usui worked on as an assistant. It was nominated for the 11th Next Manga Award in the print category in 2025, and was ranked sixteenth.
