= Super Smartphone =

Japanese manga series

- Cover of the first tankōbon volume

すごいスマホ (Sugoi Sumaho)
- Genre: Mystery; Suspense
- Manga
- Written by: Hiroki Tomisawa
- Illustrated by: Kentaro Hidano
- Published by: Shueisha
- English publisher: NA: Viz Media
- Imprint: Jump Comics
- Magazine: Weekly Shōnen Jump
- Original run: May 9, 2022 – October 17, 2022
- Volumes: 3
- icon

Super Smartphone (Japanese: すごいスマホ, Hepburn: Sugoi Sumaho) is a Japanese manga series written by Hiroki Tomisawa and illustrated by Kentaro Hidano. It was serialized in Shueisha's Weekly Shōnen Jump from May to October 2022, with its chapters collected into three tankōbon volumes. The manga is about a teenage boy who finds a "super smartphone" with a near-omniscient search engine and uses it to solve crimes.

== Publication ==
Written by Hiroki Tomisawa and illustrated by Kentaro Hidano, the series was serialized in Weekly Shōnen Jump from May 9 to October 17, 2022. The chapters have been collected into three tankōbon volumes, published from September 2022 to January 2023.

Viz Media and Manga Plus published chapters of the series in English simultaneously with the Japanese release.

=== Volumes ===
No.	Original release date	Original ISBN	English release date	English ISBN
1	September 2, 2022	978-4-08-883249-4	February 27, 2024	978-1-9747-3693-5
1. "Super Smartphone" (すごいスマホ, Sugoi Sumaho); 2. "The Superphone's Pros and Cons" (スマホの功罪, Sumaho no Kōzai); 3. "Superphone Battle" (スマホの戦い, Sumaho no Tatakai); 4. "Two Culprits" (2人の犯人, Futari no Han'nin); 5. "The Unidentified Invitation" (正体不明の招待状, Shōtai Fumei no Jōtaijō); 6. "More Than One" (一人より, Hitori yori); 7. "Three-Way Chat" (鼎談, Teidan)
2	December 2, 2022	978-4-08-883357-6	February 27, 2024	978-1-9747-4479-4
8. "The Second Group" (第二群, Dai ni-gun); 9. "First Owner Search" (ファースト所有者サーチ, Fāsuto Shoyūsha Sāchi); 10. "Moura on the First Day" (初日の藻浦, Shonichi no Moura); 11. "First Owner Contact" (ファースト所有者コンタクト, Fāsuto Shoyūsha Kontakuto); 12. "An Awesomely Awful Game of Tag" (すごい鬼ごっこ, Sugoi Oni Gokko); 13. "Moura and Zenichiro" (藻浦と全一郎, Moura to Zenichirō); 14. "The First Device" (1台目, Ichi Daime); 15. "Revocation Penalty" (剥奪ペナルティ, Hakudatsu Penaruti); 16. "Second Phase" (第2フェーズ, Daini Fēzu)
3	January 4, 2023	978-4-08-883407-8	February 27, 2024	978-1-9747-4480-0
17. "Boken's Evaluation" (ボーケンの値踏み, Bōken no Nebumi); 18. "Card Game" (情報(カード)ゲーム, Kādo Gēmu); 19. "Rei's Stylistic Standards" (レイの審美眼, Rei no Shinbigan); 20. "Zenichiro" (全一郎, Zen'ichirō); 21. "Entanglement" (因縁, In'nen); 22. "Confrontation" (相対, Sōtai); 23. "Continuation" (継続, Keizoku); 24. "Destiny" (運命, Unmei)

== Reception ==
Steven Blackburn from Screen Rant offered praise for the setup of the first chapter, though he was also concerned that the series may not be able to live up to it.

The series was nominated for the 2022 Next Manga Award in the print manga category.
