= Moriking =

Japanese manga series

- Cover of the first tankōbon volume, featuring Moriking.

森林王者モリキング (Shinrin Ōja Morikingu)
- Genre: Adventure; Fantasy comedy
- Manga
- Written by: Tomohiro Hasegawa
- Published by: Shueisha
- English publisher: NA: Viz Media
- Imprint: Jump Comics
- Magazine: Weekly Shōnen Jump
- Original run: April 13, 2020 – January 18, 2021
- Volumes: 4
- icon

Moriking (Japanese: 森林王者モリキング, Hepburn: Shinrin Ōja Morikingu; "King of the Forest Moriking") is a Japanese manga series written and illustrated by Tomohiro Hasegawa. It was serialized in Shueisha's shōnen manga magazine Weekly Shōnen Jump from April 2020 to January 2021.

== Plot ==
Third-year elementary school student Shota Aikawa's pet Japanese rhinoceros beetle, named Moriking, finally metamorphoses into an adult, but for some strange reason he looks like a male human. Aside from the horn on his head and wings on his back, he looks perfectly human but maintains his beetle traits, like walking on walls and flying. As an Insect King, which are said to be born once every one hundred million years, Moriking announces that he is destined to be King of the Forest (森林王) and rule over all insects. To prove their worth would-be kings must leave their homes and survive in the world beyond, this is how Moriking came into Shota's possession and becomes a member of the Aikawa family. However, he is but one of five insects competing to become King of the Forest.

== Publication ==
Written and illustrated by Tomohiro Hasegawa, Moriking was serialized in Shueisha's shōnen manga magazine Weekly Shōnen Jump from April 13, 2020, (Note: Comic Natalie incorrectly stated that the series' debut issue was released on April 11, 2020.) to January 18, 2021. Shueisha collected its chapters in four tankōbon volumes, released from August 4, 2020, to April 2, 2021.

In North America, the series is digitally published in English by Viz Media and by Shueisha on their Manga Plus website and application. Viz Media also started publishing the volumes digitally on May 25, 2021.

=== Volumes ===
No.	Original release date	Original ISBN	English release date	English ISBN
1	August 4, 2020	978-4-08-882379-9	May 25, 2021 (digital)	978-1-9747-2048-4
01. "Emergence"; 02. "Family Meeting"; 03. "An Errand"; 04. "Friends"; 05. "Rhinoceros Beetle vs. Praying Mantis"; 06. "Barbecue"; 07. "Police Interview"; 08. "The Retainer"
2	October 2, 2020	978-4-08-882426-0	August 24, 2021 (digital)	978-1-9747-2940-1
09. "A Day in the Life of Moriking"; 10. "Great Purple Emperor"; 11. "Contest"; 12. "The Beach"; 13. "School"; 14. "Parental Instinct"; 15. "Pals"; 16. "Rhinoceros Beetle vs. Asian Giant Hornet"; 17. "Rhinoceros Beetle vs. Bank Robbers"; Original One Shot: "Moriking, Protector of the Forest"
3	January 4, 2021	978-4-08-882528-1	November 23, 2021 (digital)	978-1-9747-3072-8
18. "Rhinoceros Beetle vs. Grandfather"; 19. "Rhinoceros Beetle vs. Film Shoot"; 20. "The Rage of Moriking"; 21. "Rhinoceros Beetle vs. Family Breakdown"; 22. "Stag Beetle"; 23. "Battle"; 24. "The Secret of Forest King Style"; 25. "Rhinoceros Beetle vs. Stag Beetle"; 26. "The Esoteric Mystery of the Forest King School"; 27. "Worlds"; 28. "Training"
4	April 2, 2021	978-4-08-882592-2	February 22, 2022 (digital)	978-1-9747-3154-1
29. "Rhinoceros Beetle vs. Riokku"; 30. "Great Purple Emperor vs. Caucasus Beetle"; 31. "Giant Asian Hornet vs. Palawan Stag Beetle"; 32. "Rhinoceros Beetle vs. Hercules Beetle"; 33. "Resolution"; 34. "Wish"; 35. "My Rhinoceros Beetle"; One Shot: "Shift Leader Tetsuzawa: Seven Days of Hell"

== Reception ==
Chris Beveridge of The Fandom Post stated that Moriking is accessible enough for general readers and "just weird enough to skew in a fun direction." He praised Hasegawa's designs, flow and direction, and backgrounds. Beveridge said that despite having many of the familiar 1980s manga trappings, Moriking uses them in a different way. He wrote that while the series is not high-art, it is a fun title that is easy to pick up and keep up with because of its quirkiness. Beveridge felt that Hasegawa was able to end the series on his own terms. He reflected that the manga unfolded in a way that reminded him of Rumiko Takahashi's early works, and despite turning into a tournament series, was still spaced out in a way that kept the character material fun. He ended by calling Moriking "a fun and enjoyable romp with good artwork, [some] nice twists and details to it, and enjoyable humor."
