= Excuse Me Dentist, It's Touching Me! =

Japanese manga series by Sho Yamazaki

- First volume cover, featuring Tomori Shirayuki (left) and Takuma Kurosumi

歯医者さん、あタってます！ (Haisha-san, Atattemasu!)
- Genre: Comedy
- Manga
- Written by: Sho Yamazaki
- Published by: Shueisha
- English publisher: Shueisha
- Imprint: Jump Comics+
- Magazine: Shōnen Jump+
- Original run: May 16, 2020 – January 21, 2023
- Volumes: 8
- icon

Excuse Me Dentist, It's Touching Me! (Note: Japanese: 歯医者さん、あタってます！, Hepburn: Haisha-san, Atattemasu!) is a Japanese manga series written and illustrated by Sho Yamazaki. It was serialized on Shueisha's Shōnen Jump+ website from May 2020 to January 2023, with its chapters collected into eight tankōbon volumes.

== Premise ==
The series focuses on Takuma Kurosumi, the member of a yakuza group who falls in love with the dentist Tomori Shirayuki during an appointment under the belief that Tomori is a woman; in reality, he is a cross-dressing man of a rival yakuza group.

== Production ==
In 2019, Sho Yamazaki published a one-shot manga on the free mobile app and website Shōnen Jump+ on October 5. At the time of its release, the one-shot won first place on a Twitter trend, exceeding 2.6 million views and becoming the most viewed one-shot work by Shōnen Jump+ in history. Due to the popularity of the one-shot, Yamazaki decided to adapt it as a full-length serialization on Shōnen Jump+.

== Publication ==
Written and illustrated by Sho Yamazaki, Excuse Me Dentist, It's Touching Me! was serialized on Shueisha's online magazine Shōnen Jump+ from May 16, 2020, to January 21, 2023. Shueisha collected its chapters in eight tankōbon volumes, released from October 2, 2020, to March 3, 2023.

The series is also released in English simultaneously with its Japanese release through Shueisha's Manga Plus service.

=== Volumes ===
No.	Release date	ISBN
1	October 2, 2020	978-4-08-882460-4
2	February 4, 2021	978-4-08-882571-7
3	July 2, 2021	978-4-08-882667-7
4	November 4, 2021	978-4-08-882802-2
5	March 4, 2022	978-4-08-883041-4
6	July 4, 2022	978-4-08-883155-8
7	December 2, 2022	978-4-08-883358-3
8	March 3, 2023	978-4-08-883478-8

== Reception ==
By February 2021, the manga had over 3 million views on the Shōnen Jump+ platform. By July 2021, it had over 100.000 copies in circulation.

The series won the grand prize at the first EbookJapan Manga Award in 2021.
