= Jiangshi X =

Japanese manga series

- Cover of the first volume

キョンシーX (Kyonshī X)
- Genre: Action; Dark fantasy; Jiangshi
- Manga
- Written by: Norihiko Kurazono
- Published by: Shueisha
- English publisher: NA: Viz Media
- Magazine: Shōnen Jump+
- Original run: January 23, 2023 – February 19, 2024
- Volumes: 4

Jiangshi X (Japanese: キョンシーX, Hepburn: Kyonshī X) is a Japanese manga series written and illustrated by Norihiko Kurazono. It began serialization on Shueisha's Shōnen Jump+ in January 2023 and concluded in February 2024; as of April 2024, four volumes have been released.

== Publication ==
Written and illustrated by Norihiko Kurazono, the series began serialization on Shueisha's Shōnen Jump+ website on January 23, 2023. On January 1, 2024, Kurazono announced that the series would end in four chapters. The series ended on February 19, 2024. The series' individual chapters have been collected into four tankōbon volumes.

Viz Media and Manga Plus published chapters of the series simultaneously with their Japanese release. In October 2024, Viz Media announced that it will release the volumes digitally starting in Q2 2025.

=== Volumes ===
No.	Original release date	Original ISBN	English release date	English ISBN
1	April 4, 2023	978-4-08-883487-0	March 25, 2025	978-1-9747-4378-0
1. "Those Who Follow the Way"; 2. "The Wish That Burns Within"; 3. "Tomb of a Thousand Kings"; 4. "The First Trial"; 5. "Looming Danger"
2	July 4, 2023	978-4-08-883621-8	March 25, 2025	978-1-9747-5377-2
6. "The Arrival of Darkness"; 7. "Upending"; 8. "The Light of the World"; 9. "Longhu Xuanshui, the Dadaoshi"; 10. "Wu Dou Jiu Dao and Jiutian Xuannu"; 11. "The Successors"; 12. "Entrusted"; 13. "The Looming Hand of Evil"; 14. "Facing Death"
3	October 4, 2023	978-4-08-883708-6	March 25, 2025	978-1-9747-5378-9
15. "San She Tang"; 16. "Xian Dan"; 17. "Wu Valley ~ The Valley of Fog"; 18. "Only One Way Out"; 19. "Awakening"; 21. "Baguadaoshi"; 22. "Separate Paths"; 23. "Days of Seeking"; One-Shot: "Ryuu to Jiangshi"
4	April 4, 2024	978-4-08-883864-9	March 25, 2025	978-1-9747-5379-6
24. "The Battle Begins"; 25. "Counterattack"; 26. "Xiaohu and Feng Ling"; 27. "Chaoyun's Determination"; 28. "Natural Talent"; 29. "A Single Fist"; 30. "Dai Ling"; 31. "The Power of the Gods"; 32. "The Power to Break the Gods"; 33. "Xiaohu"; 34. "Hope"

== Reception ==
Robbie Pleasant of Multiversity Comics praised the world building, pacing, and tension, though he also felt the story was a bit predictable. Pleasant also praised Kurazono's artwork, especially its character designs, scenery, and panel sizing. Samantha King of Screen Rant compared the opening test in Jiangshi X to Naruto's opening test, while noting the higher stakes present in Jiangshi X.
