= Manga Plus =

Online manga platform and smartphone app

- Website type: Digital manga
- Available in: English, Spanish, Thai, Indonesian, Brazilian Portuguese, Russian, French, Vietnamese, German
- Owner: Shueisha
- Editor: Shuhei Hosono
- Website: mangaplus.shueisha.co.jp
- Commercial: Yes
- Registration: Optional
- Launched: January 28, 2019
- Current status: Active

Manga Plus (stylized as MANGA Plus by SHUEISHA) is an online manga platform and smartphone app owned by Shueisha that was launched on January 28, 2019. It is available worldwide except in Japan, China, and South Korea, which already have their own services, including Shōnen Jump+, the original Japanese service. Manga Plus publishes translated versions of new chapters from currently serialized manga in Weekly Shōnen Jump, a big portion of manga from the Shōnen Jump+ app/website, and some manga from Jump Square, Weekly Young Jump, Tonari no Young Jump, and V Jump. Since the beginning of the app in 2019, all new Shōnen Jump manga in the magazine are simultaneously released in English, while since January 2023 all of the new Shōnen Jump+ manga are simultaneously released in English and since October 9, 2025, every new manga series launched in Weekly Young Jump receives a simultaneous worldwide release on Manga Plus.

The first three chapters and the three most recent chapters of all titles on the platform are available free, while all titles from Shōnen Jump+ have all of their chapters for free, except in the United States where some are also limited to first and last three chapters, due to the licensing of some manga.

A Spanish version of the service launched in February 2019, and was followed by several other languages in the next five years.

A subscription service called "Manga Plus MAX" was added to the app in October 2023.

== History ==
Weekly Shōnen Jump reached a peak weekly circulation of 6.53 million copies in the 1990s, but the decline of print media has since been reducing readership. In response, publisher Shueisha turned towards digital distribution to attempt to reach out to a wider audience. Shuhei Hosono, the head editor for Shōnen Jump+ and Manga Plus, said that they were aware of the many manga readers overseas, and that they wanted to bring manga to more people around the world. They began talks about a possible global version of Shōnen Jump+ in 2017, and finally launched Manga Plus on January 28, 2019. The service was made available to every country except China, South Korea, and Japan, with the latter countries being excluded because they each already have their own separate services. The Shōnen Jump+ editorial department manages overseas distribution through Manga Plus in-house. Yūta Momiyama, a Shueisha editor who manages the Shōnen Jump+ and Manga Plus online services, said this is with the intent of making the creation of hit manga on a global scale "a core part of Weekly Shōnen Jump's editorial approach".

Until Manga Plus, Shueisha's titles were distributed throughout the world via local publishers or distribution lines. The launch was the first time that Shueisha had expanded direct service globally. 50 manga titles were available at launch. A portion of the revenue earned from advertisements goes directly to the original manga authors.

At launch, English was the only language available on Manga Plus. The Spanish version launched on February 25, 2019, albeit with a different lineup of manga titles. The Thai version launched in December 2019, only available in Thailand, Cambodia and Laos. In February 2021, some titles became available in Indonesian. The Brazilian Portuguese version of the site launched in April 2021, only available in Brazil and Portugal. In August 2021, Manga Plus launched the Russian version and took away the region restrictions for all languages, making it possible to switch to other languages from the series page. The French version followed its launch in September 2021. In March 2024, some titles became available in German.

In October 2020, Manga Plus started its own official Discord server. In 2021, a redesigned web-app version of Manga Plus was announced to commemorate its second anniversary. At the end of June 2022, it was announced that starting in 2023, every new manga series launched on Shōnen Jump+ would receive a simultaneous English release on Manga Plus. In August 2022, Shueisha launched Manga Plus Creators, a website and app that publishes user-submitted manga inside and outside of Japan; the Shōnen Jump+ editorial department is running the service along with localization companies (including but not limited to MediBang).

In October 2023, a subscription service called "Manga Plus MAX" was added to the app. The service comes with two plans; The Standard Plan which consists of 80 currently serialized works totaling over 6000 chapters and costs $1.99 ($0.99 in Indonesia, India, the Philippines and other regions), and The Deluxe Plan which consists of over 190 titles, including completed series, totaling over 16,000 chapters and costs $4.99 ($3.99 in Indonesia, India, the Philippines and other regions). Alongside the new subscription plan, the website and app had an overhaul on its user interface and an introduction of content ratings ranging from all ages, teen and teen plus to refer to the manga in the app.

Since August 2024, all Shonen Jump+ one-shots are released simultaneously in English. On October 9, 2025, Shueisha announced that every new manga series launched in Weekly Young Jump would receive a simultaneous worldwide release on Manga Plus.

== Censorship ==
In January 2022, Manga Plus did not publish the 74th and 75th chapters of Ayakashi Triangle. The company declined to provide a reason, but Carlyle Edmundson of Screen Rant speculated it was due to the chapters containing a large amount of censored nudity of high school-aged characters.

== Format ==
Currently, in December 2023, the Manga Plus app has five sections:

- Updates: Shows all chapters released on the app in the past seven days.
- Hottest: Shows rankings of viewership in the app for series in three categories in its different language options: Hottest, Trending, and Completed.
- Browse: Compiles all manga posted on Manga Plus which you are able to search by different genres. Additional features include promotional materials and Weekly Shonen Jump author comments. Series usually have the first and last few chapters available free.
- Creators: The homepage for Manga Plus Creators. Users can read and comment on user-submitted manga – the top ten most read series are reviewed by Shueisha and Medibang, and every month they reward series they deem exceptional with a cash prize, as well as potential publication on Manga Plus proper.
- My Shelf: Compiles series that the user has favourited, as well as options to change their username or avatar for comments, change preferred languages to read, among other notices.

== Titles ==
Current Weekly Shōnen Jump series

- Akane-banashi
- Animal Signal
- Burn the Witch (on hiatus)
- Cannon Master
- Class 2-B Hero Destroyerz
- Graykeith: Translator Daemonica
- Hal Formula
- Hunter × Hunter (on hiatus)
- Ichi the Witch
- Kagurabachi
- Me & Roboco
- Nue's Exorcist
- One Piece
- Roku's House of Oddities
- RuriDragon
- Sakamoto Days
- Shinobi Undercover
- Someone Hertz
- Ultimate Exorcist Kiyoshi
- Under Doctor
- The Ura Files

Finished series

- Act-Age (now removed)
- Agravity Boys
- Alien Headbutt
- Aliens Area
- Assassination Classroom
- Astro Royale
- Ayashimon
- Bakuman
- Beast Children
- Black Clover
- Bleach
- Blue Box
- Bone Collection
- Build King
- Candy Flurry
- Captain Tsubasa
- Chainsaw Man (1st part)
- Cipher Academy
- DC3 (one-shot)
- Dear Anemone
- Death Note
- Demon Slayer: Kimetsu no Yaiba
- Do Retry
- Doron Dororon
- Double Taisei
- Dr. Stone
- Dr. Stone Reboot: Byakuya
- Dragon Ball
- Drawn to the Fire
- Earthchild
- Ekiden Bros
- The Elusive Samurai
- Embers
- Fabricant 100
- Food Wars!: Shokugeki no Soma
- Ginka & Glüna
- Gonron Egg
- Green Green Greens
- Guardian of the Witch
- Haikyu!!
- Hakutaku
- Hard-Boiled Cop and Dolphin
- Harukaze Mound
- Hell Warden Higuma
- Hero Girl and Demon Lord Call It Quits
- High School Family: Kokosei Kazoku
- Hima-Ten!
- Hinomaru Sumo
- The Hunters Guild: Red Hood
- I Tell C
- Ice-Head Gill
- Ichigoki's Under Control!!
- The Ichinose Family's Deadly Sins
- JoJo's Bizarre Adventure: Part 1–Phantom Blood
- JoJo's Bizarre Adventure: Part 2–Battle Tendency
- JoJo's Bizarre Adventure: Part 3–Stardust Crusaders
- JoJo's Bizarre Adventure: Part 4–Diamond Is Unbreakable
- JoJo's Bizarre Adventure: Part 5–Golden Wind
- JoJo's Bizarre Adventure: Part 6–Stone Ocean
- Jujutsu Kaisen
- Jujutsu Kaisen Modulo
- Kaedegami
- Kill Blue
- Kinato's Magic
- Kuroko's Basketball
- Kyokuto Necromance
- The Last Saiyuki
- The Mage Next Door
- Magu-chan: God of Destruction
- MamaYuyu
- Martial Master Asumi
- Mashle: Magic and Muscles
- Mission: Yozakura Family
- Mitama Security: Spirit Busters
- Moriking
- My Hero Academia
- Naruto
- Neolation
- Neru: Way of the Martial Artist
- Nine Dragons' Ball Parade
- Nisekoi: False Love
- Otr of the Flame
- Our Blood Oath
- Phantom Seer
- Ping-Pong Peril
- PPPPPP
- The Promised Neverland
- Protect Me, Shugomaru!
- Psych House
- Reborn! (Spanish only)
- Rurouni Kenshin
- Samurai 8: The Tale of Hachimaru
- Science vs. Magic (one-shot)
- Shadow Eliminators
- Shokugeki no Sanji
- Star of Beethoven
- Super Psychic Policeman Chojo
- Super Smartphone
- Syd Craft: Love Is a Mystery
- Teenage Renaissance! David
- Tenmaku Cinema
- Time Paradox Ghostwriter
- Tokyo Demon Bride Story
- Tokyo Shinobi Squad
- Two on Ice
- Undead Unluck
- We Never Learn
- Yokai Buster Murakami
- Yugen's All-Ghouls Homeroom
- Yui Kamio Lets Loose
- Zipman!!
- Witch Watch

Current Jump+ series

- .A -dot Alice-
- Asura's Verdict (on hiatus)
- Axed Mangaka and Doujin Creator
- Ayaru's Brush with Romance
- The Bateren Tales
- Blobtopia
- Centuria
- The Chrysalis Heart
- Class of Brains
- Dandadan
- Drama Queen
- Empyreal Cabinet
- Evangeline Puts on Shoes
- Finding the Invisible Star
- Ghost Reaper Girl (on hiatus)
- Girl Meets Rock!
- Gunze Arabaki's Magnificently Maniacal Menagerie!
- Hatori and Furuta's Extraordinarily Ordinary Life
- Hero Organization
- Hey! Devil Girl!
- Hitoner
- Home at the Horizon
- Island Rock
- KAKAKAKA
- Kindergarten Wars
- Kiruru Kill Me (Spanish only – on hiatus)
- Kurumizawa's Folly
- Lunolita
- MAD
- Maison and the Man-Eating Apartment
- Make the Exorcist Fall in Love
- Marriagetoxin
- Mayori Academy
- MikotoHako
- Noisering
- Noro-Noro Puku-Puku
- Oblivion Battery
- The Oracles of Kami
- Red Cat Ramen
- ROAD☆STAR
- SATANICA
- Shiba Inu Rooms
- Shunrai Table Tennis
- Slap Shot Girls
- Smiley & Lively☆Your Girl Happy
- Spy × Family
- Strikeout Pitch
- The Struggle Is Real with Giriko Kirigiri!
- Subaru the Invincible
- Thermae Romae Redux
- Twilight Blade
- War of the Adults
- Witchriv
- World Wide Web MIKO!

Finished series

- 2.5 Dimensional Seduction
- Abyss Rage
- Aliens, Baseball, and Civilization
- ANKOKU Delta
- Arata Primal: The New Primitive
- Ashi Dribbles Through
- Astra Lost in Space
- Astro Baby
- At Summer's End
- Ayakashi Triangle
- Beat & Motion
- Beast Orange
- Blood Wing Hunter
- Blooming Love
- Blue Flag
- Blue Proustian Moment
- ByeByeBye
- Captain Velvet Meteor: The Jump+ Dimensions ~The Beginning~ (one-shot)
- Care for Something Sweet?
- Chainsaw Man (2nd part)
- Chuck Beans
- The Creepy and Freaky
- Curtain's up, I'm off
- Daddy and Buddy
- The Dark Doctor Ikuru
- Darkest Corners of the Heart
- Darling's Vanishing Act
- Dear Sa-chan
- Deep Raputa
- Delinquent Gacha
- Demon Lord Exchange!!
- Diamond in the Rough
- Diasporaiser
- Don't Blush, Sekime-san!
- Dricam!!
- Drunk Bullet
- East, Into The Night
- Eren the Southpaw
- Eunuch of Empire
- Even If You Slit My Mouth
- Excuse Me Dentist, It's Touching Me!
- Existential Unplugged
- Fool
- G.G.G.
- The Game Devil
- Get Away, Matsumoto！-100 days escape-
- Ghost Fixers
- Ghostbuster Osamu
- Gift of Poison
- The God Before Me
- The God of Time
- Goodbye, Eri (one-shot)
- Goze Hotaru
- Handsome Must Die
- Heart Gear
- Hell Teacher: Jigoku Sensei Nube PLUS
- Hell's Paradise: Jigokuraku (Re-Edition in Spanish only)
- Hell's Paradise: Jigokuraku – Side Story: Forest of Misfortune (one-shot)
- Hina Change
- History's Mentalist
- Hokkaido Gals Are Super Adorable!
- Hope You're Happy, Lemon
- I'm So Hungry I Could Eat Basashi
- Insect Girl
- Jiangshi X
- Jinrui-Shoku: Blight of Man
- Just Listen to the Song (one-shot)
- Kaiju No.8 (Monster #8)
- Kaiju No.8: B-Side
- The Kajiki Chef: Divine Cuisine
- KoLD8: King of the Living Dead
- Kunigei – Okuni University Art Department Film Program
- Land Lock
- Life-man
- Look Back (one-shot)
- Love Is Overkill
- Lunatic Terrapop
- Machi and Oboro
- Magical Girl and Narco Wars
- Magical Girl Tsubame|Magical Girl Tsubame: I Will (Not) Save The World!
- Magilumiere Co. Ltd.
- Magokoro Scramble! ~What Lies in Your Heart?~
- Manaka the Human and the Slaughter Robot
- The Marshal King
- Me and My Gangster Neighbour
- Mikane and The Sea Woman
- Mizunoke: A Modern Tale of Mysterious Water Dwellers
- Moebana
- Money Forest
- Monochrome Days
- Moon Land
- Moshne Project
- My Girlfriend Gives Me Goosebumps!
- My Girlfriend Is 8 Meters Tall (Thai only)
- My Hero Academia: Vigilantes (Spanish only)
- My Marriage to Saneka
- Nano Hazard
- Naruto: Konoha's Story—The Steam Ninja Scrolls: The Manga
- Naruto: Sasuke's Story—The Uchiha and The Heavenly Stardust: The Manga
- Navigatoria
- Night Light Hounds
- No Gyaru in This Class
- No\Name
- ONI: Road to be the Mightiest Oni Episode ZERO
- Oversleeping Takahashi
- The Pension Life Vampire
- A Questionnaire on the Mouth
- Re/Member: The Last Night
- Romantic Killer
- Ron Kamonohashi: Deranged Detective
- Rugby Rumble
- Ryota Killed His Brother
- Sachi's Records: Sachi's Book of Revelation
- Service Wars
- Set it and Forget it
- Shibatarian
- Shinewbi
- Shojo Null
- The Sign of Abyss
- Sirens Won't Sing For You
- Skeleton Double
- SMOTHER ME
- Soloist in a Cage
- The Soul Spewing Wielder
- Spotless Love: This Love Cannot Be Any More Beautiful.
- Stage S
- Stan for Salvation
- Stellar Friends
- Suitô-to (Spanish only)
- Summer Time Rendering
- Summer Time Rendering 2026: The Room that Dreams of Murder
- Takopi's Original Sin
- Tokyo Underworld
- The Vertical World
- 'Tis Time for "Torture," Princess
- The Trembling Right Hand
- Tsuruko Returns the Favor
- The Urban Legend Files
- Vibration Man
- Wa no kage (Spanish only)
- Waiting for the Sunlight
- West Tokyo Metal Bros
- Wild Strawberry
- Witch Enforcer
- The World of SKK Girls
- World's End Harem: Britannia Lumiere
- Yattara
- You and I Are Polar Opposites
- Yumeochi: Dreaming of Falling For You

Jump Square series

- Blue Exorcist
- Claymore (finished)
- Gokurakugai
- Phantom Busters
- Platinum End (finished)
- Rosario + Vampire (finished)
- Rosario + Vampire Season II (finished)
- Seraph of the End: Vampire Reign
- Show-ha Shoten! (finished)
- Tegami Bachi (finished)
- Twin Star Exorcists (finished)
- World Trigger

V Jump series

- Boruto: Naruto Next Generations (finished)
- Boruto: Two Blue Vortex
- Dragon Ball Super (on hiatus)
- Metaphor: ReFantazio
- Yu-Gi-Oh! Arc-V (finished)

Weekly Young Jump series

- Aztec Turning of Heaven
- Bungo: Unreal
- Catenaccio
- The Days of Diamond
- Dogsred
- Enigmatica
- Genikasuri
- Goodbye My Idol
- Haunted Peak
- KAMI KILL
- Märchen Crown
- Monkey Hunting
- Morino-san Just Won't Leave Me Be
- Salamander
- So You Weren't Into Me?!
- Soon, You'll Paint Your Heart Out
- Stop! I'm Falling for You
- Terra Formars (on hiatus)
- We're J-Just Childhood Friends

Finished series

- Acting Out
- Kubo Won't Let Me Be Invisible
- The Nito Exorcists
- Oshi no Ko
- Punk Gun
- Tatsuki & Tamaki
- Tokyo Ghoul
- Tokyo Ghoul:re

Tonari no Young Jump series

- Choujin X
- The Hero's Bereaved Family

Ultra Jump series

- Baby Road Trippers
- Bug Ego

Saikyō Jump series

- I'm From Japan (finished)

Ubisoft x Jump+ one-shots

- assassin's creed: cinders
- HAPPY VAAS DAY
- Inside
- kuroneko yawa x UBISOFT
- WRENCH MAKE SOME NOISE!

MAGIC International Manga Contest winners

- Miriam of the Skulls
- Bookhead

Dash X Comic series

- The Plain Salary Man Turned Out to Be a Hero: He Was Invincible, Only to Be Exposed on His Niece's Dungeon Stream

Manga Mee series

- Love Through a Prism

Bessatsu Margaret series

- Gusts and Beats

=== Manga Plus Creators ===
Manga Plus Creators award winners

- ALMA DE UN SOLO COLOR
- Apple to Orange
- BLANK CANVAS
- BOLT
- Boomerang Head
- CAR BABY
- CELESTE
- Deaddie Du Dead
- Dodsleie
- ECLIPSE
- El Perro del Gorro Atornillado al Cráneo
- EL SEGUNDO HIJO
- ERROR US
- From The Hero In His Past
- Gankira
- GENDER X BORDER
- GEO
- Hard Metal Punch
- Hollow Grimoire
- How to heal from schizophrenia
- I SOLD MY BODY TO A GOD
- I Want To Go North
- In the name of God
- KKDKK
- LOLEIN
- METAL SOULS
- METRA-K
- No\Name
- Ojos del Karma
- Personaje
- Phantom Limb
- Pinned
- Rusty Bullet
- Ruthless Render
- Saturn Cerberus
- Scrap Circus
- Sick Guts
- SUBHUMAN/human
- Sun in the Abyss
- The Prince In The Garden
- The World has Ended, Let's go Hiking!
- Timeless
- UNBLESSED
- VERDUGO

== See also ==
- Shonen Jump digital vault
- Manga Up!
