= Agravity Boys =

Japanese manga series

- First tankōbon volume cover
- Genre: Science fiction comedy
- Manga
- Written by: Atsushi Nakamura
- Published by: Shueisha
- English publisher: NA: Viz Media
- Imprint: Jump Comics
- Magazine: Weekly Shōnen Jump (2019–2021); Jump Giga (2021)
- Original run: December 9, 2019 – April 30, 2021
- Volumes: 7
- icon

Agravity Boys (stylized in all caps) is a Japanese manga series written and illustrated by Atsushi Nakamura. It was serialized in Shueisha's Weekly Shōnen Jump magazine from December 2019 to January 2021 and epilogue chapter was published in Jump Giga in April 2021. Its chapters were collected in seven tankōbon volumes.

== Publication ==
Agravity Boys, written and illustrated by Atsushi Nakamura, was serialized in Weekly Shōnen Jump from December 9, 2019, to January 4, 2021, and an epilogue chapter was published in Jump Giga on April 30, 2021. Shueisha collected its chapters in seven tankōbon volumes, released from April 3, 2020, to July 2, 2021.

The manga is digitally published in English by Viz Media on its Shonen Jump website and the Manga Plus platform.

=== Volumes ===
No.	Original release date	Original ISBN	English release date	English ISBN
1	April 3, 2020	978-4-08-882302-7	January 26, 2021 (digital)	978-1-9747-1930-3
1. "Genar-Diversion 3-to-1" 2. "Downtown Boys, Uptown Girl?"; 3. "I'm Gonna Be (500au)" 4. "Gobbledigook"; 5. "Live to Tell the Tale"; 6. "Settler"; 7. "The District Sleeps Alone Tonight"
2	July 3, 2020	978-4-08-882345-4	April 27, 2021 (digital)	978-1-9747-2689-9
8. "Three Trash Hyper Blues"; 9. "The Flame and the Arrow"; 10. "Blink of Stars"; 11. "Fior Di Latte"; 12. "Brand-New Sunset"; 13. "I Still Remember"; 14. "You! Me! Dancing!"; 15. "Heartstrings"; 16. "They Don't Care About Us"
3	October 2, 2020	978-4-08-882421-5	July 27, 2021 (digital)	978-1-9747-2890-9
17. "Lost in the Supermarket"; 18. "Farewell for Alesta"; 19. "Get It Together"; 20. "arne" 21. "Finally We Are No One"; 22. "All I Understand Is that I Don't Understand"; 23. "The Day Will Come Before Long"; 24. "Her Space Holiday"; 25. "It Doesn't Stop"
4	January 4, 2021	978-4-08-882494-9	October 26, 2021 (digital)	978-1-9747-3052-0
26. "Modal Soul"; 27. "Past is Prologue"; 28. "Street Fighting Man"; 29. "Broccoli"; 30. "Strawberry Swing"; 31. "Mellow Out"; 32. "Holocene"; 33. "The Journey Continues"; 34. "Hidy Hidy Little Otter Like the Wind"
5	April 2, 2021	978-4-08-882593-9	January 25, 2022 (digital)	978-1-9747-3131-2
35. "Mr. Blue Sky"; 36. "Pride"; 37. "Dawn Metropolice"; 38. "Places We're Trying to Find"; 39. "My Honey Dip"; 37.5. "In My Opinion": "Special One-Shot: Ken-pa Trick"; "Side Story 1: Subzero"
6	July 2, 2021	978-4-08-882706-3	April 26, 2022 (digital)	978-1-9747-3199-2
40. "CENTER OF UNIVERSE"; 41. "HEART"; 42. "Count on Me"; 43. "GIRLS in the α-Jumbro"; 44. "Blank Space"; 45. "Go Now"; "Side Story 2: In a Safe Place"; "Side Story 2.5: New days"; "One-Shot: Genar-Diversion 3-to-1"
7	July 2, 2021	978-4-08-882707-0	July 26, 2022 (digital)	978-1-9747-3346-0
46. "Time After Time"; 47. "Mirror"; 48. "The Guide"; 49. "Tonight, Tonight"; 50. "Defying Gravity"; 51. "Hoppipolla"; "Side Story 3: Linear children"; "Side Story 4: The History of Everything"

== Reception ==
In 2020, the manga was nominated for the sixth Next Manga Awards and placed sixth out of the 50 nominees with 15,339 votes. The series ranked 25th on the 2021 "Book of the Year" list by Da Vinci magazine.
