= List of series run in Weekly Shōnen Jump =

Promotional poster for the 50th anniversary exhibition of Weekly Shōnen Jump

Weekly Shōnen Jump, a shōnen manga magazine published by Shueisha, has featured numerous series since its launch in 1968. The list, organized by decade and year of each series' first publication, will list each series run in the manga magazine, the author of the series and, in case the series has ended, when it has ended.

== 1960s ==
=== 1968–1969 ===
Manga	First Issue		Final Issue		Manga artist
Manga	issue	year	issue	year	Manga artist
Kujira Daigo (くじら大吾)	#1	1968	#11	1968	Sachio Umemoto
Chichi no Tamashii (父の魂)	#1	1968	#44	1971	Hiroshi Kaizuka
Harenchi Gakuen (ハレンチ学園)	#1	1968	#41	1972	Go Nagai
Ore wa Kamikaze (おれはカミカゼ)	#4	1968	#13	1969	Toshio Shōji
Manga Konto 55-go (漫画コント55号)	#8	1968	#30	1970	Naoya Kusumoto
Otoko no Jōken (男の条件)	#10	1968	#19	1969	Noboru Kawasaki Ikki Kajiwara
Otoko Ippiki Gaki-Daishō (男一匹ガキ大将)	#11	1968	#13	1973	Hiroshi Motomiya
Bakuhatsu Yarō (爆発野郎)	#1	1969	#14	1969	Sachio Uemoto
Kurohige Tanteichō (黒ひげ探偵長)	#6	1969	#19	1969	George Akiyama
Kick-ō Sawamura Senpū (キック王沢村旋風)	#7	1969	#11	1969	Kenji Abe, Tetsuo Sudō
Kōsoku Esper (光速エスパー)	#9	1969	#30	1970	Leiji Matsumoto (as Akira Matsumoto)
Twilight Zone (トワイライト・ゾーン)	#9	1969	#14	1969	Kōtarō Komuro
Kakumeiji Gebara (革命児ゲバラ)	#14	1969	#16	1969	Shintarō Miyawagi
Chōsensha Kēn (挑戦者ケーン)	#15	1969	#24	1969	Sachio Uemoto
Katsu made Nakuna! (勝つまで泣くな!)	#15	1969	#19	1969	Toshio Shōji
Moero! Guzuroku (燃えろ!グズ六)	#16	1969	#18	1969	Keiji Nakazawa
Muhōmatsu no Isshō (無法松の一生)	#17	1969	#19	1969	Hiroshi Asuna
Dōdō Yarō (どうどう野郎)	#20	1969	#10	1970	Noboru Kawasaki
Derorinman (デロリンマン)	#20	1969	#39	1970	George Akiyama
Mosa (モサ)	#20	1969	#2–3	1970	Tetsuya Chiba
Akatsuka Gag Shōtaiseki (赤塚ギャグ招待席)	#20	1969	#6	1970	Fujio Akatsuka, Mitsutoshi Furuya
Ore to Omae to Aitsu (おれとおまえとあいつ)	#22	1969	#12	1970	Makoto Ippongi
Hello! Jurī (ハロー!ジュリー)	#23	1969	#7	1970	Satoshi Ikezawa
Arakkure! (荒っくれ!)	#25	1969	#15	1970	Sachio Uemoto
Otoko nara Shōri no Uta o! (男なら勝利の歌を!)	#26	1969	#4–5	1970	Keiji Nakazawa
Horafuki Ichidai (ほらふき一代)	#28	1969	#21	1970	Kenji Morita

== 1970s ==
=== 1970–1971 ===
Manga	First Issue		Final Issue		Manga artist
Manga	issue	year	issue	year	Manga artist
Animal Kyūjō (アニマル球場)	#1	1970	#13	1970	Haruna Mayuzuki
Nusutto (ヌスット)	#4–5	1970	#38	1970	Bancho Kano
Nanamaru-Shiki Sentōki (七〇式戦闘機)	#4–5	1970	#7	1970	Haruna, Mayuzuki, Fuyuki Fujii
Kasane (かさね)	#6	1970	#11	1970	Ryoichi Ikegami
Siberia no Kiba (シベリアの牙)	#7	1970	#16	1970	Kōichi Ikenai
Ore wa Kebatetsu! (おれはケバ鉄!)	#8	1970	#33	1970	Fujio Akatsuka
Totsugeki Rāmen (突撃ラーメン)	#10	1970	#22	1970	Michiya Mochizuki
Worst (ワースト)	#11	1970	#34	1971	Kōtarō Komuro
Ankoku Rettō (暗黒列島)	#12	1970	#14	1970	Kōji Asaoka
Arashi! San-biki (あらし!三匹)	#13	1970	#23	1973	Satoshi Ikezawa
Sennen Ōkoku (千年王国)	#14	1970	#43	1970	Shigeru Mizuki
Namida no Gyakuten Homer (涙の逆転ホーマー)	#16	1970	#18	1970	Haruna Mayuzuki
Keppare! Ōta-Tōshu (ケッパレ!太田投手)	#18	1970	#27	1970	Shinobu Natsuki, Shinji Mizushima, Kokichi Ikazaki
1970 Tagiri (1970たぎり)	#19	1970	#35	1970	Kae Sawaki, Kenji Nanba
Jinsei Nishō Ippai (人生二勝一敗)	#20	1970	#13	1971	Ikki Kajiwara, Ikeo Ikiri
Kyūsoku 0.25-Byō! (球速0.25秒!)	#21	1970	#30	1970	Shirō Tōzaki, Haruna Mayuzuki
Okinawa (オキナワ)	#22	1970	#28	1970	Keiji Nakazawa
Inochi Girigiri (命ぎりぎり)	#23	1970	#24	1970	Jōya Kagemaru
Akage no Ōkami (赤毛の狼)	#26	1970	#29	1970	Hiroshi Asuna
Kajiko (カジコ)	#29	1970	#31	1970	Kenji Abe, Yōko
Manga Drifters (漫画ドリフターズ)	#31	1970	#46	1975	Arima Eimoto
Dokonjō Gaeru (ど根性ガエル)	#31	1970	#24	1976	Yasumi Yoshizawa
Yoake no Tategami (夜明けのタテガミ)	#33	1970	#47	1970	Kōichi Ikeuchi
Black Pro Fighter Takeru (ブラックプロファイター タケル)	#36	1970	#45	1970	Tarō Bonten
Akuma no Mizu (悪魔の水)	#38	1970	#39	1970	Yukio Shinohara
Toilet Hakase (トイレット博士)	#39	1970	#14	1977	Kazuyoshi Torii
Gen'yaku Seisho (現約聖書)	#41	1970	#23	1971	George Akiyama
Guts 4 (ガッツ4)	#42	1970	#46	1970	Kai Takizawa, Keiji Yoshitani
Jumbo Yarō (ジャンボ野郎)	#45	1970	#47	1970	Kenji Abe
Aitsu! (あいつ!)	#46	1970	#32	1971	Hisao Maki, Itsuo Sakai
Kirisakareta Seishun (切りさかれた青春)	#47	1970	#11	1971	Saho Sasazawa, Shirō Kasama
Asu wa Tsukameru ka (明日はつかめるか)	#48	1970	#7	1971	Tōru Shinohara
Wakai Arashi (若い嵐)	#52	1970	#3–4	1971	Keiji Nakazawa
Ningen no Jōken (人間の条件)	#5–6	1971	#17	1971	Junbei Gomikawa, Kenji Abe
Ikari no Mound (怒りのマウンド)	#7	1971	#16	1971	Shinobu Natsuki, Takashi Mine
ProWres Sōsamō (プロレス捜査網)	#8	1971	#18	1971	Haruna Mayuzuki
Lion Books II (ライオンブックスシリーズ)	#13	1971	#10	1973	Osamu Tezuka
Bijomaru (美女丸)	#14	1971	#20	1971	Zennosuke Tanaka
Key Girl (キーガール)	#16	1971	#35	1971	Toru Shinohara
Guzuroku Kōshinkyoku (グズ六行進曲)	#18	1971	#2	1972	Keiji Nakazawa
Japash (ジャパッシュ)	#20	1971	#44	1971	Mikiya Mochizuki
4 Tarō 1 Hime (4タロウ1ヒメ)	#21	1971	#35	1971	Yoshimoto Baron
Nekketsu-dan (ネッけつ団)	#32	1971	#34	1971	Go Nagai
Black Eagle (ブラックイーグル)	#33	1971	#36	1971	Mirai Sunny, Kenji Abe
Bara no Sakamichi (ばらの坂道)	#34	1971	#20	1972	George Akiyama
V no Kuchibue (Vの口笛)	#35	1971	#49	1971	Shirō Tōzaki, Takumi Nagayasu
Samurai Giants (侍ジャイアンツ)	#36	1971	#47	1974	Ikki Kajiwara, Kō Inoue
Seishun Saizensen (青春最前線)	#37	1971	#40	1971	Norihiro Nakajima
Kōya no Shōnen Isamu (荒野の少年イサム)	#38	1971	#2	1974	Sōji Yamakawa, Noboru Kawasaki
Yami no Senshi (闇の戦士)	#45	1971	#7	1972	Kōtarō Komuro
Zūzūshī Yatsu (ずうずうしい奴)	#49	1971	#7	1972	Renzaburō Shibata, Yūichi Sakahara, Itsuo Sakai
Head! Kiba (ヘッド!牙)	#52	1971	#2	1972	Mikiya Mochizuki

=== 1972–1973 ===
Manga	First Issue		Final Issue		Manga artist
Manga	issue	year	issue	year	Manga artist
Ore wa Ryū (おれは竜)	#2	1972	#10	1972	Yoshimoto Baron
Renshō Yarō (連勝野郎)	#3–4	1972	#11	1972	Mikio Yoshimori
Musashi (武蔵)	#5	1972	#29	1972	Hiroshi Motomiya
Hop Step (ホップステップ)	#9	1972	#3	1973	Yoshinori Takayama
Sore Ike Jump de Young Oh! Oh! (それいけジャンプでヤングおー!おー!)	#10	1972	#30	1974	Nao Miyanobu
Mysterious (ミステリオス)	#18	1972	#38	1972	Kōtarō Komuro
Shōnen no Kuni (少年の国)	#19	1972	#50	1972	Yūichi Sakahara, Goro Sakai
Kuso Bōzu Guntetsu (クソ坊主ガン鉄)	#26	1972	#36	1972	Jirō Gyū, Kō Temu
Akukamen (悪仮面)	#28	1972	#30	1972	Kōtarō Takano
The Kicker (ザ・キッカー)	#32	1972	#38	1972	Mikiya Mochizuki
Astro Kyūdan (アストロ球団)	#39	1972	#26	1976	Shirō Tōzaki, Norihiro Nakajima
Moete Hashire! (燃えて走れ!)	#40	1972	#49	1972	Kureo Iwagasaki, Motoka Murakami
Boku no Dōbutsuen Nikki Ueno Dōbutsuen • Nishiyama Toshio Hanseiki (ぼくの動物園日記 上野動物園・西山登志雄半生記)	#41	1972	#1	1975	Toshio Nishiyama, Kōichi Iimori
Mazinger Z (マジンガーZ)	#42	1972	#35	1973	Go Nagai
Spike No. 1 (スパイクNo.1)	#53	1972	#12	1973	Goro Okatani, Takeru Mitsuaki
Dream Kamen (ドリーム仮面)	#2	1973	#36	1973	Shigeru Nakamoto
Outer Lek (アウターレック)	#3	1973	#27	1973	Kōtarō Komuro
Wagahai wa Norakō (わが輩はノラ公)	#8	1973	#27	1973	Noriko Kikuchi
Onikko (鬼っ子)	#24	1973	#47	1973	Satoshi Ikezawa
Barefoot Gen (はだしのゲン)	#25	1973	#39	1974	Keiji Nakazawa
Climb Sweeper (クライム・スイーパー)	#26	1973	#40	1973	Buronson, Goro Sakai
Play Ball (プレイボール)	#27	1973	#31	1978	Akio Chiba
Hōchōnin Ajihei (包丁人味平)	#28	1973	#45	1977	Jirō Gyū, Jō Biggu
Taiyō no Shima (太陽の島)	#36	1973	#45	1973	Gensu Karatsu, Kō Temu
Ōbora Ichidai (大ぼら一代)	#37	1973	#28	1975	Hiroshi Motomiya
Hai ni Naru Shōnen (灰になる少年)	#39	1973	#49	1973	George Akiyama
Sora no Shiro (空の城)	#46	1973	#2	1974	Motoka Murakami
Onna Darake (女だらけ)	#47	1973	#45	1975	Kimio Yanagisawa

=== 1974–1975 ===
Manga	First Issue		Final Issue		Manga artist
Manga	issue	year	issue	year	Manga artist
Kaze! Hana! Tatsu! (風!花!龍!)	#3	1974	#31	1974	Satoshi Ikezawa
Pink! Punch! Miyabi (ピンク!パンチ!雅)	#4–5	1974	#17	1974	Buronson, Goro Sakai
Dohazure Tenkaichi (どはずれ天下一)	#6–7	1974	#35	1974	George Akiyama
Moero! Benten (もえろ!弁天)	#32	1974	#2	1975	Nao Miyanobu
Yōkai Hunter (妖怪ハンター)	#37	1974	#41	1974	Daijirō Morohoshi
Sukeban Arashi (スケ番あらし)	#39	1974	#42	1975	Masami Kurumada
Goronbo Isha (ごろんぼ医者)	#42	1974	#51	1974	Yoshinori Takayama
Honō no Kyojin (炎の巨人)	#43	1974	#47	1975	Shirō Mitsue, Ryoji Ryuzaki
Tomodachi Gakuen (友だち学園)	#44	1974	#48	1974	Saburō Ishikawa
Circuit no Ōkami (サーキットの狼)	#1	1975	#32	1979	Satoshi Ikezawa
Kawaii Gambler (かわいいギャンブラー)	#2	1975	#40	1975	Kazuyoshi Katsuki
Hana mo Arashi mo (花も嵐も)	#3–4	1975	#38	1975	Ikki Kajiwara, Noboru Kawasaki
Tora no Racer (虎のレーサー)	#21	1975	#34	1975	Motoka Murakami
Yūjō Gakuen (友情学園)	#35	1975	#37	1975	Kontarō
Doberman Deka (ドーベルマン刑事)	#36	1975	#48	1979	Buronson, Shinji Hiramatsu
Gakuen Yorozuya (学園よろず屋)	#40	1975	#3–4	1976	Yoshinori Takayama
Edokko Tatchan (江戸っ子辰ちゃん)	#41	1975	#43	1975	Wataru Sagawa
Zero no Shirataka (ゼロの白鷹)	#42	1975	#25	1976	Hiroshi Motomiya
1•2 no Ahho!! (1・2のアッホ!!)	#43	1975	#21	1978	Kontarō

=== 1976–1977 ===
Manga	First Issue		Final Issue		Manga artist
Manga	issue	year	issue	year	Manga artist
Blue City (ブルーシティー)	#2	1976	#21	1976	Yukinobu Hoshino
Onsen Boy (温泉ボーイ)	#3–4	1976	#20	1976	Kimio Yanagisawa
Akutare Kyojin (悪たれ巨人)	#5–6	1976	#9	1980	Yoshihiro Takahashi
Satellite no Niji (サテライトの虹)	#7	1976	#33	1976	Kaoru Akimoto, Tadashi Katō
Ankoku Shinwa (暗黒神話)	#20	1976	#25	1976	Daijirō Morohoshi
ProWres tai Jūdō (プロレス対柔道)	#21	1976	#26	1976	Yasuo Sakurai, Ryōji Ryūzaki
Hoankan Jō (保安官ジョー)	#26	1976	#37	1976	Toshiaki Matsushima, Eijiro Sawamoto
Neppū no Tora (熱風の虎)	#27	1976	#9	1977	Motoka Murakami
Tōdai Itchokusen (東大一直線)	#28	1976	#45	1979	Yoshinori Kobayashi
Beranmē Holmes (べらんめえホームズ)	#29	1976	#43	1976	Yasumi Yoshizawa
Boronbo-sensei (ボロンボ先生)	#30	1976	#40	1976	Wataru Sakawa
Condor no Tsubasa (コンドルの翼)	#31	1976	#45	1976	Norihiro Nakajima
Yon-chōme no Kaijin-kun (四丁目の怪人くん)	#34	1976	#16	1977	Takeshi Matsutani
Jitsuroku Kyojin-gun Monogatari (実録巨人軍物語)	#35	1976	#52	1976	Kensei Yoshida, Ryōji Ryūzaki
Hokuto no Kishi (北斗の騎士)	#41	1976	#3	1977	Shirō Tōzaki, Ippei Minami
Kochira Katsushika-ku Kameari Kōen-mae Hashutsujo (こちら葛飾区亀有公園前派出所)	#42	1976	#42	2016	Osamu Akimoto
U.F.O.-gari (UFO狩り)	#1	1977	#4	1977	Kōsuke Mitsuki
Ring ni Kakero (リングにかけろ)	#2	1977	#44	1981	Masami Kurumada
Yami no Tōbōi (闇の逃亡医)	#7	1977	#30	1977	Kiyoshi Takayama, Tadashi Katō
Asatarō-den (朝太郎伝)	#8	1977	#15	1979	Norihiro Nakajima
Yatchin (やっちん)	#15	1977	#29	1977	Yasumi Yoshizawa
Jump Minwa Gekijō (JUMP民話劇場)	#16	1977	#31	1977	Jizō Tanuki, Toshi Noma
Jambo de Gomennasutte (ジャンボでごめんなすって)	#21	1977	#29	1977	Jin Inoue
Hole in One (ホールインワン)	#23	1977	#49	1979	Takeji Kagami, Tatsuo Kanai
Shiroi Karyūdo (白い狩人)	#31	1977	#41	1977	Shiro Tōzaki, Masaharu Kojima
Yūkari no Ki no Moto de (ユーカリの木のもとで)	#32	1977	#42	1977	Keiji Nakazawa
Big 1	#33	1977	#52	1977	Masatoshi Suzuki
Kaiki Manatsu no Yawa (怪奇真夏の夜話)	#35	1977	#41	1977	Toshi Noma
Susume!! Pirates (すすめ!!パイレーツ)	#41	1977	#46	1980	Hisashi Eguchi
Kyojin-tachi no Densetsu (巨人たちの伝説)	#42	1977	#48	1977	Yukinobu Hoshino
Kōshi Ankoku Den (孔子暗黒伝)	#50	1977	#9	1978	Daijirō Morohoshi

=== 1978–1979 ===
Manga	First Issue		Final Issue		Manga artist
Manga	issue	year	issue	year	Manga artist
Pinboke Shatta (ピンボケ写太)	#1	1978	#29	1978	Jō Biggu
Kazoku Dōbutsuen (家族動物園)	#2	1978	#23	1978	Kōichi Iimori
Sawayaka Mantarō (さわやか万太郎)	#3–4	1978	#39	1979	Hiroshi Motomiya
Keisatsuken Monogatari Keishichō • Kanshikika Amano Shigeo Funtōki (警察犬物語 警視庁・鑑識課雨野しげお奮闘記)	#21	1978	#41	1979	Kōsuke Mitsuki, Saburō Ishikawa
Kaitei Poseidon (怪艇ポセイドン)	#22	1978	#30	1978	Takeshi Matsutani
Karate Inochi (カラテいのち)	#30	1978	#44	1978	Hisao Maki, Takashi Nishioka
Mikoto (命 MIKOTO)	#31	1978	#41	1978	Kōtarō Komuro
Rock 'n Roll Baseball (ロックンロールベースボール)	#32	1978	#42	1978	Seidō Takeshi, Kazuo Miyazaki
Ruse! Ruse!! (ルーズ!ルーズ!!)	#42	1978	#9	1979	Kontarō
Watari Kyōshi (渡り教師)	#43	1978	#2	1979	Yoshinori Takayama, Kenichi Kotani
Bikubiku Nyanko (びくびくニャンコ)	#44	1978	#1	1979	Kazuo Ōhei
Cobra (コブラ)	#45	1978	#48	1984	Buichi Terasawa
Studio Help (スタジオHELP)	#3–4	1979	#17	1979	Jō Biggu
Yasei no Bible (野生のバイブル)	#5	1979	#18	1979	Masaharu Kojima
Gō Shūto Seishun Nikki Go☆Shoot (剛秀人青春日記 GO☆シュート)	#18	1979	#20	1980	Takeshi Miya
Sky Eagle (スカイイーグル)	#19	1979	#30	1979	Shirō Tōzaki, Yoshikazu Kawajima
Sasurai Kishidō (さすらい騎士道)	#20	1979	#31	1979	Hirotoku Nakajima
Shiritsu Kiwamemichi Kōkō (私立極道高校)	#21	1979	#11	1980	Akira Miyashita
Kinnikuman (キン肉マン)	#22	1979	#21	1987 (Note: resumed on Shū Play News in 2011)	Yudetamago
Tennis Boy (テニスボーイ)	#31	1979	#9	1982	Satoshi Terajima, Kenichi Kotani
Kuroki Taka (黒き鷹)	#33	1979	#42	1979	Kontarō
Ohayō Mimi-chan (おはようミミちゃん)	#34	1979	#36	1979	Tatsurō Harada
Appare Ikka (あっぱれ一家)	#40	1979	#42	1979	Hiroyuki Kobayashi
Rajikon Sensō (ラジコン戦争)	#41	1979	#9	1980	James Takaki, Yoshikazu Kawajima
Nekkyū Suikoden (熱球水滸伝)	#42	1979	#52	1979	Norihiro Nakajima
Massugu ga Iku (真直がいく)	#43	1979	#1	1980	Mushitarō Kabuto
Futari no Derby (ふたりのダービー)	#44	1979	#18	1980	Tsukasa Tanaka
Mannen'yuki no Mieru Ie (万年雪のみえる家)	#46	1979	#17	1980	Hiroshi Motomiya

== 1980s ==
=== 1980–1984 ===
Manga	First Issue		Final Issue		Manga artist
Manga	issue	year	issue	year	Manga artist
Ricky Taifū (リッキー台風)	#1	1980	#31	1981	Shinji Hiramatsu
Izumi-chan Graffiti (いずみちゃんグラフィティー)	#2	1980	#40	1980	Tatsuo Kanai
Diamond Star (ダイヤモンドスター)	#3–4	1980	#22	1980	Satoshi Ikezawa
Dr. Slump (Dr. スランプ)	#5–6	1980	#39	1984	Akira Toriyama
Otoko no Tabidachi (男の旅立ち)	#19	1980	#18	1981	Yoshihiro Takahashi
Deguchi Kyōdai Funsenki (出口兄弟奮戦記)	#20	1980	#32	1980	Katsuyuki Edamatsu
Big Gun (ビッグガン)	#21	1980	#30	1980	Buronson, Motoki Monda
Super Kyojin (スーパー巨人)	#22	1980	#39	1980	Tsukasa Tanaka, Isshō Kabuki
Yamazaki Ginjiro (山崎銀次郎)	#23	1980	#16	1981	Hiroshi Motomiya
One Man Army (ワンマンアーミー)	#24	1980	#33	1980	K-San Maekawa
Showup High School (ショーアップ・ハイスクール)	#31	1980	#41	1980	Hitoshi Tanimura
Ā Ichiro (ああ一郎)	#32	1980	#19	1981	Kōji Koseki
Mound no Inazuma (マウンドの稲妻)	#33	1980	#42	1980	Gossēji
Bōsō Hunter (暴走ハンター)	#34	1980	#47	1980	Kazuhisa Kasai, Ryūji Tsugihara
Geki! Gokutora Ikka (激!!極虎一家)	#35	1980	#44	1982	Akira Miyashita
Ōgon no Bantam (黄金のバンタム)	#40	1980	#2–3	1981	Yoshinori Takayama, Norihiro Nakajima
Sannen Kimengumi (3年奇面組)	#41	1980	#17	1982	Motoei Shinzawa
Boku-tachi no Sensen (ぼくたちの戦線)	#42	1980	#46	1980	Izumi Aburai
Bun no Seishun! (ブンの青シュン!)	#43	1980	#52	1981	Takeshi Miya
Mario (マリオ)	#47	1980	#8	1981	Akira Nakahara, Yasuyuki Kitahara
Kumamotoken (熊元拳)	#4–5	1981	#17	1981	Jin Nishima
Hinomaru Gekijō (ひのまる劇場)	#6	1981	#29	1981	Hisashi Eguchi
Forever Shinji-kun (フォーエバー神児くん)	#17	1981	#46	1981	Katsuyuki Edamatsu
Captain Tsubasa (キャプテン翼)	#18	1981	#22	1988	Yōichi Takahashi
Fine Play (ファインプレー)	#19	1981	#28	1981	Geki Fujimori, Masato Yamaguchi
Makenshi (魔剣士)	#20	1981	#32	1981	Sachio Umemoto, Motoki Monma
Rock 'n Roll Monogatari (ロックンロール物語)	#21	1981	#30	1981	Makoto Nakahara, Kazuhira Minami
Guts Try (ガッツトライ)	#29	1981	#38	1981	Tsukasa Tanaka
Super Police (スーパーポリス)	#30	1981	#40	1981	Hitoshi Tanimura
Kaidō Racer GO (街道レーサーGO)	#31	1981	#53	1981	Satoshi Ikezawa
Shaka no Musuko (シャカの息子)	#32	1981	#50	1981	George Akamiya
Gal ga Rival (ギャルがライバル)	#33	1981	#18	1982	K-San Maekawa
Aozora Fishing (青空フィッシング)	#34	1981	#24	1982	Hiroichi Fuse, Yoshihiro Takahashi
Kōshien no Ōkami (甲子園の狼)	#36	1981	#39	1981	Ryōji Ryūzaki
Cat's♥Eye (キャッツ♥アイ)	#40	1981	#44	1984	Tsukasa Hojo
Stop!! Hibari-kun! (ストップ!! ひばりくん!)	#45	1981	#51	1983	Hisashi Eguchi
Black Angels (ブラック・エンジェルズ)	#46	1981	#23	1985	Shinji Hiramatsu
Icarus no Kobushi (イカロスの拳)	#47	1981	#5	1982	Keiji Natsume
Commander 0 (コマンダー0)	#53	1981	#16	1982	Jun Tomizawa
Scrum (スクラム)	#1–2	1982	#13	1982	Kōji Koseki
Gomenkudasai!! Alligator (ごめんください!! アリゲーター)	#1–2	1982	#5	1982	Hiroshi Aro
Fūma no Kojirō (風魔の小次郎)	#3–4	1982	#49	1983	Masami Kurumada
Kick Off (キックオフ)	#5	1982	#50	1983	Taku Chiba
High School! Kimengumi (ハイスクール!奇面組)	#18	1982	#30	1987	Motoei Shinzawa
The Fighter (THEファイター)	#18	1982	#31	1982	Toshio Tanigami
Yoroshiku Haruichiban (よろしく春一番)	#19	1982	#30	1982	Norihiro Nakajima
Cosmos End (コスモスエンド)	#20	1982	#32	1982	Toshio Kasahara (as Kasahara Tom)
Winning Shot (ウイニングショット)	#21	1982	#43	1982	Kenichi Kotani
Omisore! Toraburikko (おみそれ!トラぶりっ娘)	#26	1982	#35	1982	Hiroshi Aro
Yaburekabure (やぶれかぶれ)	#31	1982	#8	1983	Hiroshi Motomiya
Nobu ga Yuku (野武がゆく)	#32	1982	#42	1982	Motoki Monda
Jun	#33	1982	#42	1982	Hiromi Morishita
Shō to Daichi (翔と大地)	#34	1982	#13	1983	Yoshihiro Takahashi
Umi no Senshi (海の戦士)	#43	1982	#52	1982	Tetsuya Saruwatari
Yoroshiku Mechadoc (よろしくメカドック)	#44	1982	#13	1985	Ryuji Tsugihara
Tetsu no Don Quijote (鉄のドンキホーテ)	#45	1982	#3	1983	Tetsuo Hara
Mekkin Butai (滅菌部隊)	#46	1982	#50	1982	Kiichiro Tomosu
Hasaitai o Nuke (破砕帯をぬけ)	#51	1982	#5–6	1983	Kazuhito Yumi
Scandoll (スキャンドール)	#3	1983	#39	1983	Kenichi Kotani
Ā! Bishamon Kōkō (嗚呼!!毘沙門高校)	#4	1983	#25	1983	Akira Miyashita
Wing-Man (ウイングマン)	#5–6	1983	#39	1985	Masakazu Katsura
Can☆Can Every Day (CAN☆キャンえぶりでい)	#15	1983	#26	1983 (Note: moved to Fresh Jump)	Hisashi Tanaka (as Hisuwashi)
Mad Dog (マッドドッグ)	#22	1983	#31	1983	Buronson, Kei Takazawa
Shape Up Ran (シェイプアップ乱)	#26	1983	#1–2	1986	Masaya Tokuhiro
Tenchi wo Kurau (天地を喰らう)	#27	1983	#38	1984	Hiroshi Motomiya
Albatross Tonda (アルバトロス飛んだ)	#32	1983	#42	1983	Akira Nakahara, Motoki Monda
Fist of the North Star (北斗の拳)	#41	1983	#35	1988	Buronson, Tetsuo Hara
Mashōnen B.T. (魔少年ビーティー)	#42	1983	#51	1983	Hirohiko Araki
Ashita Tenpei (あした天兵)	#43	1983	#14	1984	Jūzō Yamasaki, Hideaki Hataji
Ginga -Nagareboshi Gin- (銀牙 -流れ星 銀-)	#50	1983	#13	1987	Yoshihiro Takahashi
Mecha Battler Gilfer (機械戦士ギルファー)	#51	1983	#13	1984	Motohiro Nishio, Kōji Maki
Bogī The Great (ボギー THE GREAT)	#52	1983	#30	1984	Akira Miyashita
Mr. Whity (Mr.ホワイティ)	#14	1984	#23	1984	Ken Kitashiba, Tetsuya Saruwatari
Kimagure Orange Road (きまぐれオレンジ☆ロード)	#15	1984	#42	1987	Izumi Matsumoto
Tottemo Shōnen Tankenkai (とっても少年探検隊)	#20	1984	#27	1984	Hiroshi Aro
Kid	#22	1984	#40	1984	Kenichi Kotani
Killer Boy (キラーBOY)	#28	1984	#43	1984	Masatori Usune
Otokozaka (男坂)	#32	1984	#12	1985 (Note: resumed on Shū Play News in 2014)	Masami Kurumada
Ama Gonzui (海人ゴンズイ)	#40	1984	#50	1984	George Akiyama
Gakuen Jōhōbu H.I.P. (ガクエン情報部H.I.P.)	#44	1984	#22	1985	Jun Tomizawa
Baoh (バオー来訪者)	#45	1984	#11	1985	Hirohiko Araki
Dragon Ball (ドラゴンボール)	#51	1984	#25	1995	Akira Toriyama
Bakudan (ばくだん)	#52	1984	#30	1985	Hiroshi Motomiya

=== 1985–1989 ===
Manga	First Issue		Final Issue		Manga artist
Manga	issue	year	issue	year	Manga artist
Mister Lion (ミスターライオン)	#12	1985	#21	1985	Shinobu Ōnishi
City Hunter (シティーハンター)	#13	1985	#50	1991	Tsukasa Hojo
Tsuide ni Tonchinkan (ついでにとんちんかん)	#14	1985	#22	1989	Koichi Endo
Sakigake!! Otokojuku (魁!!男塾)	#22	1985	#35	1991	Akira Miyashita
Sumomo (すもも SUMOMO)	#23	1985	#32	1985	Shun Amanuma
Tobu Kyōshitsu (飛ぶ教室)	#24	1985	#38	1985	Tsutomu Hiramatsu
Black Knight Bat (BLACK KNIGHT バット)	#31	1985	#40	1985	Buichi Terasawa
Just Ace (ジャストACE)	#32	1985	#41	1985	Hiroki Inoue
Wolf ni Kiss (ウルフにKISS)	#39	1985	#51	1985	Hiro Terashima, Kenichi Kotani
Surely!! (ショーリ!!)	#40	1985	#52	1985	Taku Chiba
Road Runner (ロードランナー ROAD RUNNER)	#41	1985	#12	1986	Ryūji Tsugihara
Love and Fire (ラブ&ファイヤー)	#51	1985	#13	1986	Shinji Hiramatsu
Chōkidōin Vander (超機動員ヴァンダー)	#52	1985	#21	1986	Masakazu Katsura
Saint Seiya (聖闘士星矢)	#1–2	1986	#49	1990	Masami Kurumada
Uwasa no Boy (うわさのBOY)	#3–4	1986	#22	1986	Nonki Miyasu
Sekiryūō (赤龍王)	#13	1986	#12	1987 (Note: moved to Super Jump)	Hiroshi Motomiya
Animal Kenshi (アニマル拳士)	#14	1986	#23	1986	Shōichi Yagihashi
Tāheruana Tomiko (ターヘルアナ富子)	#22	1986	#36	1986	Masaya Tokuhiro
Hanattare Boogie (はなったれBoogie)	#23	1986	#31	1986	Makoto Isshiki
Metal K (メタルK)	#24	1986	#33	1986	Kōji Maki
Sasuke Ninden (サスケ忍伝)	#32	1986	#41	1986	Yoshihiro Kuroiwa
Sora no Canvas (空のキャンバス)	#33	1986	#41	1987	Shinji Imaizumi
Hustle Kenpō Tsuyoshi (ハッスル拳法つよし)	#37	1986	#46	1986	Tsutoshi Hiramatsu
Kuon... (くおん…)	#42	1986	#52	1986	Hiroyuki Kawashima
Kenritsu Umisora Kōkō Yakyū Buin Yamashita Tarō-kun (県立海空高校野球部員山下たろーくん)	#44	1986	#32	1990	Kōji Koseki
Kirara (キララ)	#47	1986	#11	1987	Shinji Hiramatsu
Akaten Kyōshi Nashimoto Kotetsu (アカテン教師梨本小鉄)	#52	1986	#31	1987	Keiichi Kasui
JoJo's Bizarre Adventure (ジョジョの奇妙な冒険, JoJo no Kimyō na Bōken)	#1–2	1987	#17	1999	Hirohiko Araki
Star Bakuhatsu (スタア爆発)	#3–4	1987	#22	1987	Hideaki Hataji
Pankra Boy (PANKRA BOY)	#13	1987	#23	1987	Jun Tomizawa
Majinryū Barion (魔神竜バリオン)	#22	1987	#32	1987	Yoshihiro Kuroiwa
The Burning Wild Man (燃える!お兄さん)	#23	1987	#34	1991	Tadashi Satō
God Sider (ゴッドサイダー)	#24	1987	#51	1988	Kōji Maki
Tokubetsu Kōtsū Kidōtai Super Patrol (特別交通機動隊 SUPER PATROL)	#32	1987	#46	1987	Ryūji Tsugihara
Present from Lemon (プレゼント・フロム LEMON)	#33	1987	#51	1987	Masakazu Katsura
Yūrei Kozō ga Yatte Kita! (ゆうれい小僧がやってきた!)	#34	1987	#24	1988	Yudetamago
The Momotaroh	#42	1987	#50	1989	Makoto Niwano
No Side (ノーサイド)	#43	1987	#1–2	1988	Taku Chiba
Otoboke Nasu-sensei (おとぼけ茄子先生)	#44	1987	#14	1988	Yutaka Takahashi (as Yutaka Takaki)
Hard Luck (ハードラック)	#52	1987	#12	1988	Takashi Kisaki
Cosmos Striker (コスモスストライカー)	#1–2	1988	#15	1988	Kenichi Tanaka, Shingo Todate
Haruka Kanata (はるかかなた)	#3–4	1988	#23	1988	Ryō Watanabe
Bastard‼ (BASTARD!! -暗黒の破壊神-)	#14	1988	#36	1989 (Note: moved to Seasonal Special Issue)	Kazushi Hagiwara
Jungle King Tar-chan (ジャングルの王者ターちゃん♡)	#15	1988	#26	1990	Masaya Tokuhiro
Second (セコンド)	#16	1988	#21	1988	Yasuki Inoue
Kami-sama wa Southpaw (神様はサウスポー)	#22	1988	#31	1990	Shinji Imaizumi
Hengen Sennin Asuka♡ (変幻戦忍アスカ♡)	#23	1988	#40	1988	Yoshihiro Kuroiwa
Niji no Runner (虹のランナー)	#24	1988	#36	1988	Taku Chiba
Rokudenashi Blues (ろくでなしBLUES)	#25	1988	#10	1997	Masanori Morita
Katchū no Senshi: Gamu (-甲冑の戦士-雅武)	#35	1988	#50	1988	Yoshihiro Takahashi
Matte! Sailor Fuku Knight (舞って!セーラー服騎士)	#36	1988	#47	1988	Teruto Arika
Shō no Densetsu (翔の伝説)	#39	1988	#13	1989	Yoichi Takahashi
Magical Taruruto (まじかる☆タルるートくん)	#49	1988	#40	1992	Tatsuya Egawa
Boku wa Shitakata-kun (ボクはしたたか君)	#50	1988	#18	1990	Motoei Shinzawa
Kyōryū Daikikō (恐竜大紀行)	#51	1988	#12	1989	Daimurō Kishi
Cyber Blue (CYBERブルー)	#52	1988	#32	1989	BOB, Takaichi Mitsui, Tetsuo Hara
Super Machine Run (スーパーマシンRUN)	#13	1989	#23	1989	Akira Watanabe
The Edge (THE EDGE ジ・エッジ)	#14	1989	#29	1989	Katsuyasu Nagasawa
Cyborg Jīchan G (CYBORGじいちゃんG)	#22	1989	#52	1989	Takeshi Obata (as Shige Hijikata)
Hayato 18-ban Shōbu (隼人18番勝負)	#23	1989	#39	1989	Ryūji Tsugihara
Scrap Sandayū (SCRAP三太夫)	#24	1989	#40	1989	Yudetamago
Ten de Shōwaru Cupid (てんで性悪キューピッド)	#32	1989	#13	1990	Yoshihiro Togashi
Chameleon Jail (カメレオンジェイル)	#33	1989	#44	1989	Kazuhiko Watanabe, Takehiko Inoue (as Takehiko Nariai)
Kenkaku Shibui Kakinosuke (剣客 渋井柿之介)	#37	1989	#47	1989	Yutaka Takahashi
The Green Eyes (ザ・グリーンアイズ)	#40	1989	#10	1990	Kōji Maki
Tobikkiri (とびっきり!)	#41	1989	#23	1990	Takashi Kisaki
Dragon Quest: Dai no Daibōken (DRAGON QUEST -ダイの大冒険-)	#45	1989	#52	1996	Riku Sanjo, Yuji Horii, Kôji Inada
Video Girl Ai (電影少女)	#51	1989	#31	1992 (Note: completed in Seasonal Special Issue)	Masakazu Katsura
AT Lady!	#52	1989	#11	1990	Takeshi Okano (as Takeshi Nomura)

== 1990s ==
=== 1990–1994 ===
Manga	First Issue		Final Issue		Manga artist
Manga	issue	year	issue	year	Manga artist
Ace! (エース!)	#1–2	1990	#26	1991	Yoichi Takahashi
Keiji (花の慶次 ―雲のかなたに―)	#13	1990	#33	1993	Keiichiro Ryu, Tetsuo Hara, Aso Mio
Hikaru! Chachacha!! (ひかる!チャチャチャッ!!)	#14	1990	#25	1991	Kenji Minomo
Shuten☆Dōji (酒呑☆ドージ)	#15	1990	#30	1990	Haruto Umezawa (as Isao Umezawa)
Crisis Diver (クライシスダイバー)	#26	1990	#37	1990	Shingo Todate, Kō Nimaiya
Shin Jungle no Ōja Tar-chan ♡ (新ジャングルの王者ターちゃん♡)	#27	1990	#18	1995	Masaya Tokuhiro
GP Boy	#31	1990	#47	1990	Kunihiko Akai, Hirohisa Onikubo
Fushigi Hunter (不思議ハンター)	#32	1990	#48	1990	Yukihiro Izuka, Yoshihiro Kuroiwa
Kickboxer Mamoru (蹴撃手マモル)	#33	1990	#13	1991	Yudetamago
Metal Finish	#41	1990	#1–2	1991	Masaru Miyazaki, Nobutoshi Ejinara
Slam Dunk	#42	1990	#27	1996	Takehiko Inoue
Chin'yūki: Tarō to Yukai na Nakama-tachi (珍遊記: 太郎とゆかいな仲間たち)	#49	1990	#13	1992	Man☆gataro
Tengyan -Minakata Kumagusu-den- (てんぎゃん -南方熊楠伝-)	#50	1990	#10	1991	Daimurō Kishi
Yū☆Yū☆Hakushō (幽☆遊☆白書)	#51	1990	#32	1994	Yoshihiro Togashi
Chōkidō Bōhatsu Shūkyū Yarō Libero no Takeda (超機動暴発蹴球野郎 リベロの武田)	#13	1991	#50	1992	Makoto Niwano
Outer Zone (アウターゾーン)	#14	1991	#15	1994	Shin Mitsuhara
Pennant Race: Yamada Taichi no Kiseki (ペナントレース やまだたいちの奇蹟)	#25	1991	#3–4	1994	Kōji Koseki
Time Walker Rei (タイムウォーカー零)	#26	1991	#48	1991	Yūki Hidaka
Don Vulcan -Seinaru Otoko no Densetsu- (ドン・ボルガン -聖なる男の伝説-)	#27	1991	#38	1991	Ryūji Tsugihara
F no Senkō -Ayrton Senna no Chōsen- (Fの閃光 -アイルトン・セナの挑戦-)	#35	1991	#51	1991	Kōyū Nishimura, Katsuyasu Nagasawa, Hirohisa Onikubo
Ten yori Takaku! (天より高く!)	#40	1991	#8	1992	Yūko Asami
Tengai-kun no Kareinaru Nayami (天外君の華麗なる悩み)	#41	1991	#6	1992	Makura Shō
Tennenshoku Danji Buray (天然色男児BURAY)	#50	1991	#12	1992	Kazuki Takahashi (as Kazumasa Takahashi)
Majin Bōkentan Lamp Lamp (魔神冒険譚 ランプ・ランプ)	#52	1991	#25	1992	Fujinobu Izumi, Takeshi Obata
Change Up!! (チェンジUP!!)	#12	1992	#33	1992	Shinji Imaizumi
Monmonmon (モンモンモン)	#13	1992	#50	1993	Tsunomaru
Yagyū Reppūken Ren'ya (柳生烈風剣連也)	#14	1992	#24	1992	Takashi Noguchi
Bakuhatsu! Uchū Kuma-san Tāta Bear & Kikuchiyo-kun (爆発!宇宙クマさんタータ・ベア&菊千代くん)	#18	1992	#39	1992	Tadashi Satō
Baramon no Kazoku (瑪羅門の家族)	#25	1992	#12	1993	Akira Miyashita
Hareluya	#26	1992	#35	1992	Haruto Umezawa
Bonbonzaka-Kōkō Engeki-bu (ボンボン坂高校演劇部)	#34	1992	#30	1995	Yutaka Takahashi
Silent Knight Shō (SILENT KNIGHT翔)	#35	1992	#48	1992	Masami Kurumada
Ōzumō Keiji (大相撲刑事)	#40	1992	#49	1992	Tarō Gachon
Chibi (CHIBI-チビ-)	#41	1992	#45	1993	Yoichi Takahashi
Kyūkyoku!! Hentai Kamen (究極!!変態仮面)	#42	1992	#46	1993	Keishū Ando
Hareluya II Boy	#50	1992	#9	1999	Haruto Umezawa
Psycho+ (PSYCHO+)	#51	1992	#11	1993	Ryu Fujisaki
Chikarabito Densetsu -Oni o Tsugu Mono- (力人伝説 -鬼を継ぐ者-)	#52	1992	#23	1993	Masaru Miyazaki, Takeshi Obata
Fire-Snow no Kaze (ファイアスノーの風)	#13	1993	#24	1993	Hidetoshi Sugine (as Hideaki Matsune)
Genshoku Chōjin Paintman (原色超人PAINTMAN)	#14	1993	#25	1993	Fumihiko Ōta
Vice (VICE -ヴァイス-)	#25	1993	#34	1993	Yoshihiro Yanagawa
Ninku (NINKU -忍空-)	#26	1993	#38	1995	Kōji Kiriyama
Komorebi no Moto de... (こもれ陽の下で…)	#31	1993	#5–6	1994	Tsukasa Hojo
Tottemo! Luckyman (とっても!ラッキーマン)	#35	1993	#30	1997	Hiroshi Gamō
D·N·A² ~Dokokade Nakushita Aitsuno Aitsu~ (D・N・A² 〜何処かで失くしたあいつのアイツ〜)	#36–37	1993	#29	1994	Masakazu Katsura
Hell Teacher Nūbē (地獄先生ぬ〜べ〜)	#38	1993	#24	1999	Makura Shō, Takeshi Okano
Neural Network Melinda♡Fight (ニューラル ネットワーク ミリンダ♡ファイト)	#47	1993	#7	1994	Tadashi Satō
Chōdokyū Senshi Justice (超弩級戦士ジャスティス)	#48	1993	#11	1994	Kazutoshi Yamane
Kurayami o Buttobase! (暗闇をぶっとばせ!)	#2	1994	#16	1994	Hiroyuki Miyazaki, Shinji Imaizumi
Bomber Girl	#7	1994	#17	1994	Makoto Niwano
Suizan Police Gang (翠山ポリスギャング)	#8	1994	#28	1994	Shinobu Kaitani
Jigoku Senshi Maō (地獄戦士魔王)	#9	1994	#38	1994	Makoto Karibe
Kagemusha Tokugawa Ieyasu (影武者徳川家康)	#12	1994	#13	1995	Keniichirō Ryū, Tetsuo Hara, Sho Aikawa
Ōsama wa Roba ~Hattari Teikoku no Gyakushū~ (王様はロバ〜はったり帝国の逆襲〜)	#17	1994	#52	1996	Kokichi Naniwa
Captain Tsubasa: Principe Del Sole/World Youth Saga (キャプテン翼 太陽王子編/-ワールドユース編-)	#18	1994	#37–38	1997	Yoichi Takahashi
Rurouni Kenshin (るろうに剣心 -明治剣客浪漫譚-)	#19	1994	#43	1999	Nobuhiro Watsuki
Man'yūki ~Babā to Awarena Geboku-tachi~ (まんゆうき 〜ばばあとあわれなげぼくたち〜)	#29	1994	#50	1994	Man☆gataro
Fukashigidō Kitan (不可思議堂奇譚)	#30	1994	#39	1994	Koichi Endo
Urutora★Eleven (うるとら★イレブン)	#31	1994	#41	1994	Tetsuya Watanabe, Tenya Gano
Yatsu no Na wa Maria (奴の名はMARIA)	#40	1994	#48	1994	Munenori Michimoto
Tōkyō Hanzai Monogatari -Bosatsu to Fudō- (東京犯罪物語 -菩薩と不動-)	#41	1994	#49	1994	Makoto Iwasaki, Ryūji Tsugihara
Bakudan	#42	1994	#8	1995	Akira Miyashita
Rash!!	#43	1994	#9	1995	Tsukasa Hojo
Midori no Makibaō (みどりのマキバオー)	#50	1994	#9	1998	Tsunomaru
Mind Assassin	#52	1994	#29	1995	Hajime Kazu

=== 1995–1999 ===
Manga	First Issue		Final Issue		Manga artist
Manga	issue	year	issue	year	Manga artist
Hisoka♥Returns! (密♥リターンズ!)	#10	1995	#19	1996	Ken Yagami
Jinnai-ryū Jūjutsu Butōden Majima-kun Suttobasu!! (陣内流柔術武闘伝 真島クンすっとばす!!)	#11	1995	#8	1998	Makoto Niwano
Genki Yade (元気やでっ)	#14	1995	#24	1995	Mamoru Tsuchiya, Ryūji Tsugihara, Junji Yamamoto
Takeki Ryūsei (猛き龍星)	#21–22	1995	#48	1995	Tetsuo Hara
Karakurizōshi Ayatsuri Sakon (人形草紙あやつり左近)	#23	1995	#1	1996	Sharaku Marō, Takeshi Obata
Ryūdō no Shigu (竜童のシグ)	#24	1995	#36–37	1995	Takashi Noguchi
Shadow Lady	#31	1995	#2	1996	Masakazu Katsura
Mōturu Commando Guy (モートゥルコマンドーGUY)	#32	1995	#44	1995	Shinichi Sakamoto
Hoshi o Tsugu Mono (惑星をつぐ者)	#41	1995	#49	1995	Takanobu Toda
Level E (レベルE)	#42	1995	#3–4	1997	Yoshihiro Togashi
Mizu no Tomodachi Kappāman (水のともだちカッパーマン)	#45	1995	#30	1996	Masaya Tokuhiro
Kaosu Kanburiya (かおす寒鰤屋)	#51	1995	#9	1996	Ton Ōkawara
Sexy Commando Gaiden: Sugoi yo!! Masaru-san (セクシーコマンドー外伝 すごいよ!!マサルさん)	#52	1995	#40	1997	Kyosuke Usuta
Wild Half	#3–4	1996	#52	1998	Yūko Asami
Oni ga Kitarite (鬼が来たりて)	#5–6	1996	#18	1996	Gin Shinga
Makuhari (幕張)	#11	1996	#49	1997	Yasuaki Kita
Shinkōen-dan Shinshiroku (神光援団紳士録)	#12	1996	#29	1996	Yasuteru Iwata
Diamond (ダイヤモンド)	#21	1996	#39	1996	Yoshihiro Yanagawa
K.O. Masatome (K.O.マサトメ)	#22–23	1996	#40	1996	Shinnosuke Enda
Hoshin Engi (封神演義)	#28	1996	#47	2000	Ryu Fujisaki
Doruhira (ドルヒラ)	#32	1996	#46	1996	Yukihiro Inoue
Shinri Sōsakan Kusanagi Aoi (心理捜査官 草薙葵)	#33	1996	#5–6	1997	Keiichirō Nakamaru, Mori Takashimi, Kaoru Tsugishima
Yu-Gi-Oh! (遊☆戯☆王)	#42	1996	#15	2004	Kazuki Takahashi
Majokko ViVian (魔女娘ViVian)	#49	1996	#43	1997	Yukata Takahashi
Be Takuto!! ~Yaban Nare~ (BE TAKUTO!! 〜野蛮なれ〜)	#50	1996	#19	1997	Takashi Noguchi
Bastard!! -Ankoku no Hakaishin- (Corrupt Law Arc) (BASTARD!! -暗黒の破壊神-(背徳の掟編))	#5–6	1997 (Note: moved from Seasonal Special Issue)	#36–37	2000 (Note: moved to Ultra Jump)	Kazushi Hagiwara
Watashi no Kaeru-sama (私のカエル様)	#10	1997	#22–23	1997	Yūki Nakajima
Hanasaka Tenshi Tenten-kun (花さか天使テンテンくん)	#11	1997	#30	2000	Kazumata Oguri
Butsu Zone (仏ゾーン)	#12	1997	#31	1997	Hiroyuki Takei
I"s (I"S<アイズ>)	#19	1997	#24	2000	Masakazu Katsura
Wrestling with Momoko (Wrestling with もも子)	#20	1997	#39	1997	Masaya Tokuhiro
Merry Wind	#21	1997	#32	1997	Junji Yamamoto
JOKER (JOKER)	#32	1997	#47	1997	Kazutoshi Yamane
Seikimatsu Leader-den Takeshi! (世紀末リーダー伝たけし!)	#33	1997	#37–38	2002	Mitsutoshi Shimabukuro
One Piece	#34	1997	Present		Eiichiro Oda
Cool -Rental Body Guard-	#40	1997	#7	1998	Takeshi Konomi
Kirin ~The Last Unicorn~ (きりん 〜The Last Unicorn〜)	#41	1997	#10	1998	Ken Yagami
Cowa!	#48	1997	#15	1998	Akira Toriyama
Meiryōtei Gotō Seijūro (明稜帝 梧桐勢十郎)	#52	1997	#52–53	1999	Hajime Kazu
Ga-Row (画-ROW)	#1	1998	#11	1998	Akitsugu Mizumoto
Rookies	#10	1998	#39	2003	Masanori Morita
Shōnen Tantei Q (少年探偵Q)	#11	1998	#26	1998	Enjin, Gin Shinga
Kappa Revolution (河童レボリューション)	#12	1998	#32	1998	Ishitori Yoshiyamate
Whistle! (ホイッスル!)	#13	1998	#45	2002	Daisuke Higuchi
Hunter × Hunter	#14	1998	Present / irregular schedule		Yoshihiro Togashi
Shaman King (シャーマンキング, Shāman Kingu)	#31	1998	#40	2004	Hiroyuki Takei
Kajika (カジカ)	#32	1998	#44	1998	Akira Toriyama
Base Boys	#33	1998	#51	1998	Makoto Niwano
Boku wa Shōnen Tantei Dan♪♪ (僕は少年探偵ダン♪♪)	#43	1998	#11	1999	Hiroshi Gamō
Rising Impact (ライジングインパクト)	#52	1998	#12	2002	Nakaba Suzuki
Shinkaigyo	#1	1999	#12	1999	Kanako Tanaka
Hikaru no Go (ヒカルの碁)	#2–3	1999	#22–23	2003	Yumi Hotta, Takeshi Obata, Yukari Umezawa
Yamatai Gensōki (邪馬台幻想記)	#12	1999	#29	1999	Kentaro Yabuki
Shūkyū-den: Field no Ōkami Striker Jin! (-蹴球伝- フィールドの狼FW陣!)	#13	1999	#30	1999	Yoichi Takahashi
Daisukiō -Dice King- (大好王 -ダイスキング-)	#14	1999	#31	1999	Munenori Michimoto
Bushizawa Receive (武士沢レシーブ)	#18	1999	#40	1999	Kyosuke Usuta
Mach Head (マッハヘッド)	#19	1999	#32	1999	Hidebu Takahashi (as Keiichi Sagawa)
Survibee (サバイビー)	#31	1999	#51	1999	Tsunomaru
The Prince of Tennis (テニスの王子様)	#32	1999	#14	2008	Takeshi Konomi
Childragon	#33	1999	#45	1999	Naoki Azuma (as Keishin Azuma)
ZombiePowder.	#34	1999	#11	2000	Tite Kubo
Naruto (NARUTO―ナルト―)	#43	1999	#50	2014	Masashi Kishimoto
Romancers	#44	1999	#12	2000	Yūko Asami

== 2000s ==
=== 2000–2004 ===
Manga	First Issue		Final Issue		Manga artist
Manga	issue	year	issue	year	Manga artist
Jojo's Bizarre Adventure Part 6: Stone Ocean (ジョジョの奇妙な冒険 Part6 ストーンオーシャン)	#1	2000	#19	2003	Hirohiko Araki
Bremen (無頼男 -ブレーメン-)	#2	2000	#41	2001	Haruto Umezawa
Tsurikkīzu Pintarō (ツリッキーズピン太郎)	#12	2000	#31	2000	Makura Shō, Takeshi Okano
Sanjūshi (三獣士)	#13	2000	#32	2000	Kanako Tanaka
Sand Land	#23	2000	#36–37	2000	Akira Toriyama
Normandy Secret Club (ノルマンディーひみつ倶楽部, Norumandī Himitsu Kurabu)	#24	2000	#20	2001	Mikio Itō
Black Cat	#32	2000	#29	2004	Kentaro Yabuki
Kaiser Spike (カイゼルスパイク)	#33	2000	#46	2000	Yusuke Takeyama
Rocket de Tsukinukero! (ロケットでつきぬけろ!)	#34	2000	#44	2000	Yuki
Pyu to Fuku! Jaguar (ピューと吹く!ジャガー)	#38	2000	#38	2010	Kyosuke Usuta
Junjō Pine (純情パイン)	#47	2000	#9	2001	Namie Odama
Lilim Kiss (りりむキッス)	#48	2000	#21–22	2001	Mizuki Kawashita
Bakabakashiino! (バカバカしいの!)	#49	2000	#10	2001	Hiroshi Gamō (as Hiroshino Gamō)
Gun Blaze West	#2	2001	#35	2001	Nobuhiro Watsuki
Jūshin Ikari Torajiro (重臣 猪狩虎次郎)	#11	2001	#34	2001	Tsunomaru
Bobobōbo Bōbobo (ボボボーボ・ボーボボ)	#12	2001	#50	2005	Yoshio Sawai
Mr. Fullswing	#23	2001	#23	2006	Shinya Suzuki
Karasuman (鴉MAN)	#24	2001	#40	2001	Hajime Kazu
Magician² (魔術師²)	#35	2001	#51	2001	Takeshi Okano
Bleach	#36–37	2001	#38	2016	Tite Kubo
I'm a Faker!	#42	2001	#52	2001	Kazuya Yamamoto
Grand Vacan (グラン・バガン)	#43	2001	#1	2002	Kazushige Yamada
Mononoke! Nyantarō (もののけ!にゃんタロー)	#51	2001	#11	2002	Kazumata Oguri
Sowaka (ソワカ)	#52	2001	#24	2002	Naoki Azuma
Sakuratetsu Taiwahen (サクラテツ対話篇)	#1	2002	#21	2002	Ryu Fujisaki
Akkera Kanjinchō (あっけら貫刃帖)	#11	2002	#22–23	2002	Yuki Kobayashi
Strawberry 100% (いちご100%)	#12	2002	#35	2005	Mizuki Kawashita
Shōnen Esper Nejime (少年エスパーねじめ, Shōnen Esupā Nejime)	#13	2002	#33	2002	Namie Odama
Pretty Face (プリティフェイス)	#24	2002	#28	2003	Yasuhiro Kano
Number 10	#25	2002	#34	2002	Kiyu
Eyeshield 21 (アイシールド21)	#34	2002	#29	2009	Riichiro Inagaki, Yusuke Murata
Sword Breaker	#35	2002	#51	2002	Haruto Umezawa
A•O•N	#44	2002	#1	2003	Munenori Michimoto
Ultra Red (Ultra Red)	#45	2002	#29	2003	Nakaba Suzuki
Granada -Kyūkoku Kagaku Tankentai- (グラナダ -究極科学探検隊-)	#1	2003	#16	2003	Mikio Itō
Tattoo Hearts	#2	2003	#17	2003	Osamu Kajisa
Yamikami Kō ~Kurayami ni Dokkiri!~ (闇神コウ〜暗闇にドッキリ!〜)	#18	2003	#35	2003	Kimiya Kaji
Santa! (★SANTA!★)	#19	2003	#31	2003	Kengo Kurando
Kicks Megamix (キックス メガミックス)	#28	2003	#41	2003	Masayuki Kichikawa
Gotchan desu!! (ごっちゃんです!!)	#29	2003	#16	2004	Tsunomaru
Buso Renkin (武装錬金)	#30	2003	#21–22	2005 (Note: completed in Akamaru Jump)	Nobuhiro Watsuki
Kanagawa Isonan Fūten-gumi (神奈川磯南風天組)	#31	2003	#51	2003	Hajime Kazu
Sengoku Rappaden Sasori (戦国乱破伝サソリ)	#41	2003	#52	2003	Tōru Uchimizu
Thoroughbred to Yobanaide (サラブレッドと呼ばないで, Sarabureddo to Yobanaide)	#42	2003	#2	2004	Takayo Hasegawa, Kōhei Fujino
Kannade (神撫手)	#43	2003	#3	2004	Takeo Horibe
Death Note	#1	2004	#24	2006	Tsugumi Ohba, Takeshi Obata
Gintama (銀魂)	#2	2004	#42	2018 (Note: moved to Jump Giga)	Hideaki Sorachi
Live	#3	2004	#14	2004	Haruto Umezawa
Steel Ball Run	#8	2004	#47	2004 (Note: completed in Ultra Jump)	Hirohiko Araki
Gedo the Unidentified Mysterious Boy (未確認少年ゲドー, Mikakunin Shōnen Gedō)	#15	2004	#12	2005	Takeshi Okano
Muteki Tekki Spin-chan (無敵鉄姫スピンちゃん)	#16	2004	#27	2004	Amon Dai
Shōnen Guardian (少年守護神)	#17	2004	#28	2004	Naoki Azuma
Katekyō Hitman Reborn! (家庭教師ヒットマンREBORN!)	#26	2004	#50	2012	Akira Amano
D.Gray-man	#27	2004	#22–23	2009 (Note: moved to Jump Square)	Katsura Hoshino
Chijō Saisoku Seishun Takkyū Shōnen Pūyan (地上最速青春卓球少年ぷーやん)	#28	2004	#41	2004	Kenichi Kiriki
Wāqwāq	#40	2004	#23	2005	Ryu Fujisaki
Muhyo to Rōjī no Mahōritsu Sōdan Jimusho (ムヒョとロージーの魔法律相談事務所)	#53	2004	#14	2008	Yoshiyuki Nishi

=== 2005–2009 ===
Manga	First Issue		Final Issue		Manga artist
Manga	issue	year	issue	year	Manga artist
Yūto (ユート)	#11	2005	#32	2005	Yumi Hotta, Kei Kawano
Majin Tantei Nōgami Neuro (魔人探偵脳噛ネウロ)	#12	2005	#21	2009	Yūsei Matsui
Kain (カイン)	#24	2005	#43	2005	Tōru Uchimizu
Takaya -Senbu Gakuen Gekitōden- (タカヤ -閃武学園激闘伝-)	#25	2005	#26	2006	Yūjirō Sakamoto
Kirihōshi (切法師)	#26	2005	#44	2005	Yūki Nakajima
Mieru Hito (みえるひと)	#33	2005	#42	2006	Toshiaki Iwashiro
Taizō Moteō Saga (太臓もて王サーガ)	#34	2005	#24	2007	Amon Dai
べしゃり暮らし (Beshari-Gurashi)	#44	2005	#30	2006 (Note: completed in Weekly Young Jump)	Masanori Morita
Ōdorobō Poruta (大泥棒ポルタ)	#45	2005	#9	2006	Kazuki Kitashima
Shinsetsu Bobobōbo Bōbobo (真説ボボボーボ・ボーボボ)	#3	2006	#31	2007	Yoshio Sawai
Tsugihagi Hyōryūsakka (ツギハギ漂流作家)	#10	2006	#32	2006	Kōhei Nishi
Maison Du Penguin (メゾン・ド・ペンギン)	#11	2006	#24	2007	Kōji Ōishi
Takaya -Yoake no Enjin'ō- (タカヤ -夜明けの炎刃王-)	#13	2006	#26	2006	Yūjirō Sakamoto
Nazo no Murasame-kun (謎の村雨くん)	#20	2006	#43	2006	Mikio Itō
To Love Ru (To LOVEる -とらぶる-)	#21–22	2006	#40	2009	Saki Hasemi, Kentaro Yabuki
M×0 (エム×ゼロ)	#23	2006	#25	2008	Yasuhiro Kano
Over Time	#33	2006	#52	2006	Yōichi Amano
Zan (斬)	#34	2006	#52	2006	Naoya Sugita
P2! - Let's Play Pingpong!	#43	2006	#52	2007 (Note: completed in Akamaru Jump)	Tatsuma Ejiri
Hand's (HAND'S -ハンズ-)	#44	2006	#1	2007	Yūichi Itakura
Blue Dragon RalΩGrad (BLUE DRAGON ラルΩグラド)	#1	2007	#32	2007	Tsuneo Takano, Takeshi Obata
Contractor M&Y (神力契約者M&Y)	#2	2007	#13	2007	Akira Akatsuki
Jumbor Barutronica (重機人間ユンボル)	#3	2007	#14	2007	Hiroyuki Takei
Samurai Usagi (サムライうさぎ)	#14	2007	#33	2008	Teppei Fukushima
Volleyball Tsukai Gōda Gō (バレーボール使い 郷田豪)	#15	2007	#39	2007	Ichiro Takahashi
Boku no Watashi no Yūsha-gaku (ぼくのわたしの勇者学)	#24	2007	#35	2008	Shuichi Aso
Hitomi no Catoblepas (瞳のカトブレパス)	#25	2007	#40	2007	Yasuki Tanaka
Belmonde Le VisiteuR (ベルモンド Le VisiteuR)	#32	2007	#51	2007	Shōei Ishioka
Sket Dance	#33	2007	#32	2013	Kenta Shinohara
Hatsukoi Limited (初恋限定。)	#44	2007	#26	2008	Mizuki Kawashita
Psyren (PSYREN -サイレン-)	#1	2008	#52	2010	Toshiaki Iwashiro
K.O. Sen	#2	2008	#15	2008	Katsutoshi Murase
Muddy	#3	2008	#16	2008	Ai Matsumoto (as Shō Aimoto)
Shiritsu Poseidon Gakuen Kōtōbu (私立ポセイドン学園高等部)	#4–5	2008	#24	2008	Shinichirō Ōe
Nura: Rise of the Yokai Clan (ぬらりひょんの孫, Nurarihyon no Mago)	#15	2008	#30	2012 (Note: completed in Jump Next!)	Hiroshi Shiibashi
Bari Haken (バリハケン)	#16	2008	#52	2008	Shinya Suzuki
Double Arts (ダブルアーツ)	#17	2008	#41	2008	Naoshi Komi
Hetappi Manga Kenkyūjo R (ヘタッピマンガ研究所R)	#22–23	2008	#24	2010	Yusuke Murata
Toriko (トリコ)	#25	2008	#51	2016	Mitsutoshi Shimabukuro
Dogashikaden! (どがしかでん!)	#27	2008	#40	2008	Kosuke Hamada
Bakuman. (バクマン。)	#37–38	2008	#21–22	2012	Tsugumi Ohba, Takeshi Obata
Inumarudashi (いぬまるだしっ)	#39	2008	#27	2012	Kōji Ōishi
Chagecha (チャゲチャ)	#42	2008	#49	2008	Yoshio Sawai
Asklepios (アスクレピオス)	#43	2008	#11	2009	Tōru Uchimizu
Meister (マイスター)	#1	2009	#12	2009	Kaji Kimiya
Kuroko no Basuke (黒子のバスケ)	#2	2009	#40	2014	Tadatoshi Fujimaki
Bokke-san (ぼっけさん)	#3	2009	#22–23	2009	Yoshiyuki Nishi
Beelzebub (べるぜバブ)	#13	2009	#13	2014	Ryūhei Tamura
Hoopmen (フープメン)	#14	2009	#31	2009	Kawaguchi Yukinori
Medaka Box (めだかボックス)	#24	2009	#22–23	2013	Nisio Isin, Akira Akatsuki
Akaboshi: Ibun Suikoden (AKABOSHI -異聞水滸伝-)	#25	2009	#49	2009	Yōichi Amano
Anedoki (あねどきっ)	#32	2009	#7	2010	Mizuki Kawashita
Kagijin (鍵人-カギジン-)	#33	2009	#50	2009	Yasuki Tanaka
Wasshoi! Waji Mania (わっしょい! わじマニア)	#34	2009	#51	2009	Satoshi Wajima
Hokenshitsu no Shinigami (保健室の死神)	#41	2009	#29	2011	Shō Aimoto
Super Dog Rilienthal (賢い犬リリエンタール)	#42	2009	#23	2010	Daisuke Ashihara
Neko Wappa! (ねこわっぱ!)	#50	2009	#11	2010	Naoya Matsumoto
Shinseiki Idol Densetsu Kanata Seven Change (新世紀アイドル伝説 彼方セブンチェンジ)	#51	2009	#12	2010	Shūichi Asō

== 2010s ==
=== 2010–2014 ===
Manga	First Issue		Final Issue		Manga artist
Manga	issue	year	issue	year	Manga artist
Lock On! (ロックオン!, Rokku On)	#12	2010	#30	2010	Kenta Tsuchida
Kiben Gakuha, Yotsuya-senpai no Kaidan (詭弁学派、四ッ谷先輩の怪談)	#13	2010	#31	2010	Haruichi Furudate
Metallica Metalluca (メタリカメタルカ, Metarika Metaruka)	#24	2010	#41	2010	Teruaki Mizuno
Shōnen Shikku (少年疾駆)	#25	2010	#40	2010	Yūto Tsukuda
SWOT (スウォット)	#31	2010	#51	2010	Naoya Sugita
Ōmagadoki Dōbutsuen (逢魔ヶ刻動物園)	#32	2010	#19	2011	Kōhei Horikoshi
Enigma (ǝnígmǝ【エニグマ】, Eniguma)	#41	2010	#47	2011 (Note: completed in Jump Next!)	Kenji Sakaki
Light Wing (ライトウィング, Raito Wingu)	#42	2010	#14	2011	Hideo Shinkai
Dois Sol (ドイソル, Doi Soru)	#11	2011	#28	2011	Katsutoshi Murase
Märchen Ōji Grimm (メルヘン王子グリム, Meruhen Ōji Gurimu)	#12	2011	#30	2011	Kizuku Watanabe
Magico (マジコ, Majiko)	#13	2011	#31	2012	Naoki Iwamoto
Sengoku Armors (戦国ARMORS)	#14	2011	#31	2011	Shōta Sakaki
Kikai Banashi Hanasaka Ikkyū (奇怪噺 花咲一休)	#23	2011	#38	2011	Kenta Komiyama, Yūya Kawada
Stars (ST&RS -スターズ-, Sutāzu)	#30	2011	#20	2012	Ryōsuke Takeuchi, Masaru Miyokawa
Kagami no Kuni no Harisugawa (鏡の国の針栖川)	#31	2011	#11	2012	Yasuhiro Kanō
Kurogane (クロガネ)	#39	2011	#9	2013	Haruto Ikezawa
Nisekoi (ニセコイ)	#48	2011	#36–37	2016	Naoshi Komi
Genzon! Kodai Seibutsu-shi Packy (現存!古代生物史パッキー, Genzon! Kodai Seibutsu-shi Pakkī)	#49	2011	#23	2012	Retsu
Haikyu!! (ハイキュー!!, Haikyū!!)	#12	2012	#33–34	2020	Haruichi Furudate
Pajama na Kanojo. (パジャマな彼女。)	#13	2012	#40	2012	Kōsuke Hamada
Koisome Momiji (恋染紅葉)	#24	2012	#51	2012	Tsugirō Sakamoto, Tadahiro Miura
The Disastrous Life of Saiki K. (斉木楠雄のΨ難, Saiki Kusuo no Sainan)	#24	2012	#13	2018 (Note: epilogue chapters completed in Jump Giga)	Shūichi Asō
Barrage (戦星のバルジ, Sensei no Baruji)	#25	2012	#41	2012	Kōhei Horikoshi
Assassination Classroom (暗殺教室, Ansatsu Kyōshitsu)	#31	2012	#16	2016	Yūsei Matsui
Takamagahara (タカマガハラ)	#32	2012	#49	2012	Jūzō Kawai
Retsu!!! Date-senpai (烈!!!伊達先パイ)	#41	2012	#10	2013	Shinsuke Kondō
Cross Manage (クロス・マネジ, Kurosu Maneji)	#42	2012	#34	2013	Kaito
Hungry Joker	#50	2012	#24	2013	Yūki Tabata
Shinmai Fukei Kiruko-san (新米婦警キルコさん)	#51	2012	#25	2013	Masahiro Hirakata
Food Wars: Shokugeki no Soma (食戟のソーマ, Shokugeki no Sōma)	#52	2012	#29	2019 (Note: epilogue chapters completed in Jump Giga)	Yūto Tsukuda, Shun Saeki, Yuki Morisaki
Koisuru Edison (恋するエジソン, Koisuru Ejison)	#10	2013	#35	2013	Kizuku Watanabe
World Trigger (ワールドトリガー, Wārudo Torigā)	#11	2013	#52	2018 (Note: moved to Jump Square)	Daisuke Ashihara
Soul Catcher(S) (ソウル キャッチャーズ, Sōru Kyatchāzu)	#24	2013	#31	2014	Hideo Shinkai
Mutō Black (無刀ブラック, Mutō Burakku)	#25	2013	#36	2013	Daijirō Nonoue
Smoky B.B. (スモーキーB.B., Sumōkī Bī Bī)	#26	2013	#41	2013	Kenta Komiyama, Yūya Kawada
Jaco the Galactic Patrolman (銀河パトロール ジャコ, Ginga Patorōru Jako)	#33	2013	#44	2013	Akira Toriyama
Kurokuroku (クロクロク)	#35	2013	#52	2013	Atsushi Nakamura
Hime-dol!! (ひめドル!!, Himedoru)	#36	2013	#52	2013	Kazurō Kyō
Hachi: Tōkyō 23-ku (HACHI -東京23宮-)	#42	2013	#12	2014	Yoshiyuki Nishi
Koi no Cupid Yakenohara Jin (恋のキューピッド 焼野原塵, Koi no Kyūpiddo Yakenohara Jin)	#43	2013	#12	2014	Tomohiro Hasegawa
Isobe Isobē Monogatari: Ukiyo wa Tsurai yo (磯部磯兵衛物語～浮世はつらいよ～)	#47	2013	#46	2017	Ryō Nakama
Iron Knight (アイアンナイト, Aian Naito)	#1	2014	#18	2014	Tomohiro Yagi
Illegal Rare	#11	2014	#41	2014	Hiroshi Shiibashi
I Shōjo (i・ショウジョ)	#12	2014	#32	2014 (Note: moved to "Jump LIVE!", continued in "ShōnenJump+" as iShōjo+)	Toshinori Takayama
Stealth Symphony (ステルス交境曲)	#13	2014	#33	2014	Ryōgo Narita, Yōichi Amano
Tokyo Wonder Boys	#14	2014	#24	2014	Kento Shimoyama, Tsunehiro Date
Hinomaru Sumo (火ノ丸相撲, Hinomaru Zumō)	#26	2014	#34	2019	Kawada
My Hero Academia (僕のヒーローアカデミア, Boku no Hīrō Akademia)	#32	2014	#36–37	2024	Kōhei Horikoshi
Mitsukubi Condor (三ツ首コンドル, Mitsukubi Kondoru)	#33	2014	#49	2014	Ryō Ishiyama
Yoakemono (ヨアケモノ)	#34	2014	#50	2014	Yūsaku Shibata
Judos (ジュウドウズ, Jūdōzu)	#41	2014	#8	2015	Shinsuke Kondou
Hi-Fi Cluster (ハイファイクラスタ)	#42	2014	#9	2015	Ippei Gotō
Sporting Salt	#43	2014	#10	2015	Yûto Kubota
Takujō no Ageha (卓上のアゲハ)	#51	2014	#22–23	2015	Itsuki Furuya
E-Robot	#52	2014	#12	2015	Ryohei Yamamoto

=== 2015–2019 ===
Manga	First Issue		Final Issue		Manga artist
Manga	issue	year	issue	year	Manga artist
School Judgment: Gakkyu Hotei (学糾法廷, Gakkyū Hōtei)	#1	2015	#24	2015 (Note: completed in Shōnen Jump+)	Nobuaki Enoki, Takeshi Obata
Kagamigami (カガミガミ)	#11	2015	#51	2015	Toshiaki Iwashiro
Black Clover (ブラッククローバー)	#12	2015	#38	2023 (Note: Completed in Jump Giga)	Yūki Tabata
Cyborg Roggy (改造人間ロギイ, Kaizō Ningen Rogii)	#13	2015	#24	2015	Yū Miki
Ultra Battle Satellite	#14	2015	#31	2015	Yūsuke Utsumi
Naruto Side Story: The Seventh Hokage and the Scarlet Spring (NARUTO -ナルト- 外伝 〜七代目火影と緋色の花つ月〜)	#22–23	2015	#32	2015	Masashi Kishimoto
Straighten Up! Welcome to Shika High's Competitive Dance Club (背すじをピン!と ～鹿高競技ダンス部へようこそ～, Sesuji o Pin! to Shika-kō Kyōgi Dansu-bu e Yōkoso)	#24	2015	#11	2017	Takuma Yokota
Lady Justice (レディ・ジャスティス)	#25	2015	#41	2015	Ken Ogino
Devily Man (デビリーマン)	#26	2015	#42	2015	Kentaro Fukuda
Best Blue (ベストブルー)	#33	2015	#52	2015	Masahiro Hirakata
Mononofu (ものの歩)	#42	2015	#34	2016	Haruto Ikezawa
Samon-kun wa Summoner (左門くんはサモナー)	#43	2015	#27	2017	Shun Numa
Buddy Strike (バディストライク)	#51	2015	#10	2016	Kaito
Yuuna and the Haunted Hot Springs (ゆらぎ荘の幽奈さん, Yuragi-sō no Yūna-san)	#10	2016	#27	2020	Tadahiro Miura
Demon Slayer: Kimetsu no Yaiba (鬼滅の刃, Kimetsu no Yaiba)	#11	2016	#24	2020	Koyoharu Gotouge
Boruto: Naruto Next Generations (BORUTO -ボルト- -NARUTO NEXT GENERATIONS-)	#23	2016	#28	2019 (Note: part 1 completed in V Jump)	Mikio Ikemoto, Ukyō Kodachi
Takuan to Batsu no Nichijō Enma-chō (たくあんとバツの日常閻魔帳)	#24	2016	#44	2016	Kentaro Itani
The Promised Neverland (約束のネバーランド, Yakusoku no Nebārando)	#35	2016	#28	2020	Kaiu Shirai, Posuka Demizu
Love Rush! (ラブラッシュ!)	#38	2016	#50	2016	Ryohei Yamamoto
Red Sprite (レッドスプライト)	#39	2016	#52	2016	Tomohiro Yagi
Ibitsu no Amalgam (歪のアマルガム)	#45	2016	#12	2017	Ryō Ishiyama
Spring Weapon Number One (青春兵器ナンバーワン, Supuringu Wepon Nanbā Wan)	#46	2016	#14	2018	Tomohiro Hasegawa
Demon's Plan (デモンズプラン)	#51	2016	#12	2017	Yoshimichi Okamoto
Ole Golazo (オレゴラッソ)	#52	2016	#13	2017	Takamasa Moue
We Never Learn (ぼくたちは勉強ができない, Bokutachi wa Benkyō ga Dekinai)	#10	2017	#3–4	2021	Taishi Tsutsui
U19	#11	2017	#28	2017	Yūji Kimura
Demon Prince Poro's Diaries (ポロの留学記, Poro no Ryūgakuki)	#12	2017	#29	2017	Hitsuji Gondaira
Hungry Marie (腹ペコのマリー, Harapeko no Marī)	#13	2017	#46	2017	Ryūhei Tamura
Dr. Stone	#14	2017	#14	2022	Riichiro Inagaki, Boichi
Robot × LaserBeam	#16	2017	#30	2018	Tadatoshi Fujimaki
Shūdan! (シューダン!)	#28	2017	#6	2018	Takuma Yokota
Cross Account (クロスアカウント)	#29	2017	#7	2018	Tsunehiro Date
Tomatoypoo no Lycopene (トマトイプーのリコピン)	#45	2017	#26	2018 (Note: moved to Shōnen Jump+)	Kōji Ōishi
Full Drive (フルドライブ)	#47	2017	#12	2018	Genki Ono
Golem Hearts (ゴーレムハーツ)	#48	2017	#12	2018	Gen Ōsuka
Bozebeats	#7	2018	#20	2018	Ryōji Hirano
Act-Age (アクタージュ act-age)	#8	2018	#36–37	2020	Tatsuya Matsuki, Shiro Usazaki
Jujutsu Kaisen (呪術廻戦)	#14	2018	#44	2024	Gege Akutami
Noah's Notes (ノアズノーツ)	#15	2018	#38	2018	Haruto Ikezawa
Ziga (ジガ-ZIGA-)	#16	2018	#30	2018	Rokurō Sano, Kentarō Hidano
Momiji no Kisetsu (紅葉の棋節)	#24	2018	#40	2018	Masayoshi Satoshō
Kimi o Shinryaku Seyo! (キミを侵略せよ!)	#25	2018	#41	2018	Kazusa Inaoka
Sōgō Jikan Jigyō Gaisha Daihyō Torishimariyaku Shachō Senzoku Hisho Tanaka Seiji (総合時間事業会社 代表取締役社長専属秘書 田中誠司)	#30	2018	#50	2018	Keiji Amatsuka
Alice & Taiyo (アリスと太陽, Arisu to Taiyō)	#31	2018	#51	2018	Takahide Totsuno
Teenage Renaissance! David (思春期ルネサンス! ダビデ君, Shishunki Runesansu! Dabide-kun)	#42	2018	#26	2019	Yūshin Kuroki
I'm From Japan (ジモトがジャパン, Jimoto ga Japan)	#42	2018	#26	2019 (Note: completed in Saikyō Jump)	Seiji Hayashi
The Comiq	#46	2018	#52	2018	Kazuki Takahashi
Chainsaw Man (チェンソーマン)	#1	2019	#2	2021 (Note: moved to Shōnen Jump+, part 2 resumed in 2022)	Tatsuki Fujimoto
ne0;lation	#2	2019	#22–23	2019	Tomohide Hirao, Mizuki Yoda
Hell Warden Higuma (獄丁ヒグマ, Gokutei Higuma)	#3	2019	#24	2019	Natsuki Hokami
The Last Saiyuki (最後の西遊記, Saigo no Saiyūki)	#14	2019	#38	2019	Daijirō Nonoue
Yui Kamio Lets Loose (神緒ゆいは髪を結い, Kamio Yui wa Kami o Yui)	#15	2019	#52	2019	Hiroshi Shiibashi
Samurai 8: The Tale of Hachimaru (サムライ8 八丸伝, Samurai Eito: Hachimaruden)	#24	2019	#17	2020	Masashi Kishimoto, Akira Okubo
Double Taisei (ふたりの太星, Futari no Taisei)	#25	2019	#52	2019	Kentaro Fukuda
Beast Children (ビーストチルドレン)	#26	2019	#1	2020	Kento Terasaka
Tokyo Shinobi Squad (トーキョー忍スクワッド)	#27	2019	#2	2020	Yuki Tanaka, Kento Matsuura
Mission: Yozakura Family (夜桜さんちの大作戦, Yozakura-san-chi no Daisakusen)	#39	2019	#8	2025	Hitsuji Gondaira
Mitama Security: Spirit Busters (ミタマセキュ霊ティ, Mitama Sekyureti)	#40	2019	#36–37	2020	Tsurun Hatomune
Dr. Stone Reboot: Byakuya (Dr.STONE reboot:百夜)	#48	2019	#4–5	2020	Boichi

== 2020s ==
=== 2020–2024 ===
Manga	First Issue		Final Issue		Manga artist
Manga	issue	year	issue	year	Manga artist
Zipman!!	#1	2020	#19	2020	Yūsaku Shibata
Agravity Boys	#2	2020	#5–6	2021 (Note: completed in Jump Giga)	Atsushi Nakamura
Undead Unluck (アンデッドアンラック, Andeddo Anrakku)	#8	2020	#9	2025	Yoshifumi Tozuka
Mashle: Magic and Muscles (マッシュル-MASHLE-, Masshuru)	#9	2020	#31	2023	Hajime Kōmoto
Guardian of the Witch (魔女の守人, Majo no Moribito)	#10	2020	#29	2020	Asahi Sakano
Moriking (森林王者モリキング, Shinrin Ōja Morikingu)	#20	2020	#7	2021	Tomohiro Hasegawa
Bone Collection (ボーンコレクション, Bōn Korekushon)	#21–22	2020	#38	2020	Jun Kirarazaka
Time Paradox Ghostwriter (タイムパラドクスゴーストライター, Taimu Paradokusu Gōsutoraitā)	#24	2020	#39	2020	Kenji Ichima, Tsunehiro Date
Ayakashi Triangle (あやかしトライアングル, Ayakashi Toraianguru)	#28	2020	#20	2022 (Note: completed in Shōnen Jump+)	Kentaro Yabuki
Magu-chan: God of Destruction (破壊神マグちゃん, Hakaishin Magu-chan)	#29	2020	#10	2022	Kei Kamiki
Hard-Boiled Cop and Dolphin (灼熱のニライカナイ, Shakunetsu no Nirai Kanai)	#30	2020	#29	2021	Ryūhei Tamura
Me & Roboco (僕とロボコ, Boku to Roboko)	#31	2020	Present		Shūhei Miyazaki
Burn the Witch	#38	2020	#41	2020 (Note: Short serialization, announcement stated Season 2 sequel as coming soon)	Tite Kubo
Phantom Seer (仄見える少年, Honomieru Shōnen)	#39	2020	#18	2021	Tōgo Gotō, Kento Matsuura
High School Family: Kokosei Kazoku (高校生家族, Kōkōsei Kazoku)	#40	2020	#12	2023	Ryō Nakama
Our Blood Oath (ぼくらの血盟, Bokura no Ketsumei)	#41	2020	#8	2021	Kazu Kakazu
Build King	#50	2020	#19	2021	Mitsutoshi Shimabukuro
Sakamoto Days	#51	2020	#52	2026	Yūto Suzuki
The Elusive Samurai (逃げ上手の若君, Nige Jōzu no Wakagimi)	#8	2021	#12	2026	Yūsei Matsui
I Tell C (アイテルシー, Aiterushī)	#9	2021	#30	2021	Kazusa Inaoka
Witch Watch (ウィッチウォッチ, Witchi Wotchi)	#10	2021	#51	2026	Kenta Shinohara
Nine Dragons' Ball Parade (クーロンズ・ボール・パレード, Kūronzu Bōru Parēdo)	#11	2021	#31	2021	Mikiyasu Kamada, Ashibi Fukui
Blue Box (アオのハコ, Ao no Hako)	#19	2021	#33	2026	Kouji Miura
Candy Flurry (アメノフル, Ame no Furu)	#20	2021	#41	2021	Ippon Takegushi, Santa Mitarashi
The Hunters Guild: Red Hood (レッドフード, Reddo Fūdo)	#30	2021	#49	2021	Yūki Kawaguchi
Neru: Way of the Martial Artist (NERU-武芸道行-, Neru: Bugei Dōgyō)	#31	2021	#50	2021	Minya Hiraga
PPPPPP	#42	2021	#13	2023	Maporo 3-Gō
Ayashimon (アヤシモン)	#50	2021	#26	2022	Yuji Kaku
Protect Me, Shugomaru! (守れ! しゅごまる, Mamore! Shugomaru)	#51	2021	#27	2022	Daiki Ihara
Doron Dororon (ドロンドロロン)	#52	2021	#39	2022	Gen Ōsuka
Akane-banashi (あかね噺)	#11	2022	Present		Yuki Suenaga, Takamasa Moue
Earthchild (地球の子, Chikyū no Ko)	#12	2022	#40	2022	Hideo Shinkai
Super Smartphone (すごいスマホ, Sugoi Sumaho)	#23	2022	#46	2022	Hiroki Tomisawa, Kentarō Hidano
Aliens Area	#27	2022	#47	2022	Fusai Naba
RuriDragon (ルリドラゴン, Ruridoragon)	#28	2022	Present		Masaoki Shindo
Tokyo Demon Bride Story (大東京鬼嫁伝, Dai Tōkyō Oniyome Den)	#40	2022	#18	2023	Tadaichi Nakama
Ginka & Glüna (ギンカとリューナ, Ginka to Ryūna)	#41	2022	#19	2023	Shinpei Watanabe
The Ichinose Family's Deadly Sins (一ノ瀬家の大罪, Ichinose-ke no Taizai)	#50	2022	#49	2023	Taizan 5
Cipher Academy (暗号学園のいろは, Angō Gakuen no Iroha)	#51	2022	#10	2024	Nisio Isin, Yūji Iwasaki
Ichigoki's Under Control!! (イチゴーキ!操縦中, Ichigōki! Sōjūchū)	#52	2022	#20	2023	Seiji Hayashi
Fabricant 100 (人造人間100, Jinzō Ningen 100)	#1	2023	#40	2023	Daisuke Enoshima
Tenmaku Cinema (テンマクキネマ, Tenmaku Kinema)	#19	2023	#41	2023	Yuto Tsukuda, Shun Saeki
Kill Blue (キルアオ, Kiru Ao)	#20	2023	#40	2025	Tadatoshi Fujimaki
Do Retry (ドリトライ, Do Ritorai)	#23	2023	#42	2023	Jun Kirarazaka
Nue's Exorcist (鵺の陰陽師, Nue no Onmyōji)	#24	2023	Present		Kōta Kawae
Martial Master Asumi (アスミカケル, Asumi Kakeru)	#29	2023	#11	2024	Kawada
Ice-Head Gill (アイスヘッドギル, Aisu Heddo Giru)	#30	2023	#50	2023	Ikuo Hachiya
MamaYuyu (魔々勇々, Mama Yūyū)	#41	2023	#19	2024	Yoshihiko Hayashi
Kagurabachi (カグラバチ)	#42	2023	Present		Takeru Hokazono
Two on Ice (ツーオンアイス, Tsū on Aisu)	#43	2023	#20	2024	Elck Itsumo
Green Green Greens (グリーングリーングリーンズ, Gurīn Gurīn Gurīnzu)	#52	2023	#28	2024	Kento Terasaka
Shadow Eliminators (累々戦記, Ruirui Senki)	#1	2024	#21	2024	Kento Amemiya
Super Psychic Policeman Chojo (超巡！超条先輩, Chōjun! Chōjō Senpai)	#11	2024	#28	2025	Shun Numa
Dear Anemone	#12	2024	#29	2024	Rin Matsui
Astro Royale (願いのアストロ, Negai no Asutoro)	#20	2024	#21	2025	Ken Wakui
Kyokuto Necromance (極東ネクロマンス, Kyokutō Nekuromansu)	#21	2024	#40	2024	Fusai Naba
Psych House (さいくるびより, Saikuru Biyori)	#24	2024	#41	2024	Omusuke Kobayashi
Yokai Buster Murakami (妖怪バスター村上, Yōkai Basutā Murakami)	#29	2024	#50	2024	Daiki Ihara
Ultimate Exorcist Kiyoshi (悪祓士のキヨシくん, Ekusoshisuto no Kiyoshi-kun)	#30	2024	Present		Shōichi Usui
Hima-Ten! (ひまてん！)	#32	2024	#31	2026	Genki Ono
Ichi the Witch (魔男のイチ, Madan no Ichi)	#41	2024	Present		Osamu Nishi, Shiro Usazaki
Shinobi Undercover (しのびごと, Shinobigoto)	#42	2024	Present		Ippon Takegushi, Santa Mitarashi
Hakutaku (白卓 HAKUTAKU)	#43	2024	#10	2025	Kōki Ishikawa
Syd Craft: Love Is a Mystery (シド・クラフトの最終推理, Shido Kurafuto no Saishū Suiri)	#51	2024	#29	2025	Taishi Tsutsui

=== 2025–present ===
Manga	First Issue		Final Issue		Manga artist
Manga	issue	year	issue	year	Manga artist
Embers (エンバーズ, Enbāzu)	#10	2025	#30	2025	Kei Kurumazaki, Sōtarō Nishii
Star of Beethoven (Bの星線, Bī no Seisen)	#11	2025	#31	2025	Morihiro Hayashi
Nice Prison	#21	2025	#41	2025	Tatsuya Suganuma
Otr of the Flame (灯火のオテル, Tomoshibi no Oteru)	#24	2025	#8	2026	Yūki Kawaguchi
Harukaze Mound (ハルカゼマウンド, Harukaze Maundo)	#29	2025	#9	2026	Tōgo Gotō, Kento Matsuura
Kaedegami (カエデガミ)	#30	2025	#47	2025	Jun Harukawa
Ekiden Bros (エキデンブロス, Ekiden Burosu)	#31	2025	#48	2025	Daiki Nono
Ping-Pong Peril (ピングポング, Pingu Pongu)	#32	2025	#49	2025	Yoshiharu Kataoka
Jujutsu Kaisen Modulo (呪術廻戦≡(モジュロ), Jujutsu Kaisen Mojuro)	#41	2025	#15	2026	Gege Akutami, Yūji Iwasaki
Someone Hertz (さむわんへるつ, Samuwan Herutsu)	#42	2025	Present		Ei Yamano
Gonron Egg (ゴンロン・エッグ, Gonron Eggu)	#48	2025	#18	2026	Shuhei Tanizaki
The Mage Next Door (隣の小副川, Tonari no Osoegawa)	#49	2025	#19	2026	Hideaki Nabe
Hero Girl and Demon Lord Call It Quits (JK勇者と隠居魔王, Jēkē Yūsha to Inkyo Maō)	#50	2025	#20	2026	Matsuri Hatsubina
Under Doctor	#9	2026	Present		Kyō Tanimoto
Kinato's Magic (回撃のキナト, Kaigeki no Kinato)	#10	2026	#39	2026	Kento Amemiya
Alien Headbutt (エイリアンヘッドバット, Eirian Heddobatto)	#11	2026	#27	2026	Akira Inui
Roku's House of Oddities (ロクのおかしな家, Roku no Okashina Ie)	#19	2026	Present		Atsushi Nakamura
Drawn to the Fire (夏と蛍籠, Natsu to Mushikago)	#20	2026	#40	2026	Masayoshi Satoshō
Class 2-B Hero Destroyerz (2年B組 勇者デストロイヤーず, Ni-nen Bī-gumi Yūsha Desutoroiyāzu)	#21	2026	Present		Hideaki Sorachi
Animal Signal (アニマルシグナル, Animaru Shigunaru)	#28	2026	Present		Robinson Haruhara, Taishi Tsutsui
Hal Formula	#29	2026	Present		Kento Terasaka
Cannon Master (カノンマスター, Kanon Masutā)	#30	2026	Present		Reiya Machida
The Ura Files (ウラのレポート, Ura no Repōto)	#40	2026	Present		Shun Numa, Yūshin Kuroki
Graykeith: Translator Daemonica (グレイキースの魔界語訳録, Gureikīsu no Makai Goyakuroku)	#41	2026	Present		Natsuki Hokami
Jan Is in Danger! (ジャンがあぶない！, Jan ga Abunai!)	#51	2026	Present		Ryō Nakama
Hizuki of the Ginza Patrol (銀座裏通り交番の日月さん, Ginza Uradōri Kōban no Hizuki-san)	#52	2026	Present		Hitsuji Gondaira
Tonari no Tenisu-bu no Kimi to. (となりのテニス部のキミと。)	#53	2026	Present		Shinobu Kasaya

== Monthly Shōnen Jump holdovers ==
During the changeover of monthly magazines between Monthly Shōnen Jump and Jump SQ. in 2007, four monthly series ran stories in the WSJ magazine. Of the four, Claymore ran several one-shot extra chapters.

Manga	First Issue in MSJ		Final Issue in MSJ		Manga artist
Manga	issue	year	issue	year	Manga artist
Masuda Kōsuke Gekijō Gag Manga Biyori (増田こうすけ劇場 ギャグマンガ日和)	#1	2000	#7	2007	Kōsuke Masuda
Claymore	#7	2001	#7	2007	Norihiro Yagi
Rosario to Vampire (ロザリオとバンパイア)	#5	2004	#7	2007	Akihisa Ikeda
Tegami Bachi (テガミバチ)	#10	2006	#7	2007	Hiroyuki Asada
