= Bone Collection =

Japanese manga series

- Cover of the first volume

ボーンコレクション (Bōn Korekushon)
- Genre: Supernatural
- Manga
- Written by: Jun Kirarazaka
- Published by: Shueisha
- English publisher: NA: Viz Media
- Imprint: Jump Comics
- Magazine: Weekly Shōnen Jump
- Original run: April 20, 2020 – August 24, 2020
- Volumes: 2
- icon

Bone Collection (Japanese: ボーンコレクション, Hepburn: Bōn Korekushon) is a Japanese manga series written and illustrated by Jun Kirarazaka. It was serialized in Shueisha's shōnen manga magazine Weekly Shōnen Jump from April to August 2020 and published in two volumes.

== Publication ==
The series originated as a one-shot by Jun Kirarazaka, published in Shueisha's shōnen manga magazine Weekly Shōnen Jump in August 2019. The one-shot was turned into a full series, which debuted in the same magazine on April 20, 2020. It finished on August 24, 2020. The series' individual chapters were collected into two tankōbon volumes.

Viz Media published chapters of the series simultaneously with the original release, and also released the series' volumes digitally on September 28, 2021.

=== Volumes ===
No.	Original release date	Original ISBN	English release date	English ISBN
1	August 4, 2020	978-4-08-882416-1	September 28, 2021	978-1-9747-2049-1
01. "I Don't Want to Die!"; 02. "I Want to Become Human!"; 03. "I Want to Dominate"; 04. "I Want to Execute You"; 05. "I Don't Want to Be Executed!"; 06. "I Don't Want to Hurt You"; 07. "I Want to Cut You"
2	November 4, 2020	978-4-08-882511-3	September 28, 2021	978-1-9747-2707-0
08. "I Want to Be an Exorcist"; 09. "I Want to Drink Milk"; 10. "I Want to Teach You"; 11. "I Want to Learn!"; 12. "I Can't Believe It!"; 13. "I Want to Fight!"; 14. "I Want to Get Married"; 15. "I Want to Live with You"; Bonus Chapter: "Last Bone Love"

== Reception ==
Zach Wilkerson and Vince Ostrowski of Multiversity Comics praised the humor, though they felt the series was too generic. Jacob Parker-Dalton of Otaquest felt that the series had potential, though he felt the artwork was poorly drawn. Steven Blackburn of Screen Rant compared Doron Dororon to Bone Collection, ultimately calling the former a blander version of the latter.
