= Harukaze Mound =

Japanese manga series

- Cover of the first tankōbon volume, featuring the Kuzumi twins on top (Nagiharu, left; Aokaze, right) and Ibuki Hayama (bottom).

ハルカゼマウンド (Harukaze Maundo)
- Genre: Sports (baseball)
- Manga
- Written by: Togo Goto
- Illustrated by: Kento Matsuura
- Published by: Shueisha
- English publisher: NA: Viz Media
- Imprint: Jump Comics
- Magazine: Weekly Shōnen Jump
- Original run: June 16, 2025 – January 26, 2026
- Volumes: 4

Harukaze Mound (Japanese: ハルカゼマウンド, Hepburn: Harukaze Maundo) is a Japanese manga series written by Togo Goto and illustrated by Kento Matsuura. It was originally a one-shot published in Shueisha's Weekly Shōnen Jump magazine 33rd issue in 2022, then was serialized in the same magazine between June 2025 and January 2026.

== Plot ==
When they were young, twin brothers Aokaze and Nagiharu Kuzumi promised to play baseball together at Kōshien. In middle school, right-handed Aokaze, the younger brother, blossoms into a top pitching prospect recruited to Hojitsu, while left-handed Nagiharu trails in his shadow. With insight from brilliant catcher Ibuki Hayama, Nagiharu develops a completely different submarine style and follows Ibuki as a battery to a team of "outsiders" at Hinazakura High School rather than Hojitsu.

== Characters ==
=== Hinazakura (Hina) High School ===
Nagiharu Kuzumi (P/LH)
The talented older brother, who pitches with a submarine delivery. Before adjusting his delivery on the advice of Ibuki, he used "shadow pitching" to mirror his brother.
Ibuki Hayama (C)
Captain of the Hina High baseball team. Although he led the under-12 national team as a member of the "golden generation", Ibuki's stature as "the super short catcher" and an untimely injury in middle school prevented him from drawing more attention and gave him time to study the sport. He remains a fiercely competitive athlete, with a keen eye for talent.
Yuma Hodaka (CF)
Maisuke Urushibara (SS)
"The defense ninja" who has remarkable reflexes and reaction time.
Kippei Wakamori (2B)
Initially dismisses Nagiharu as "discount Aokaze"; he is "the defense artisan" who is skilled at fielding and throwing with great accuracy.
Satomi Kikunaga (3B)
Attractive and popular; he is a mercurial hitter who pulls through in the clutch.
Kengo Yanagi (1B)
Serious and helpful; he played middle school baseball in Chiba at the affiliate of Ryokusen High School, and intended to continue to the high school there, but his swing, which impressed Ibuki, failed to develop as intended.
Iroha Minase
Reserve player, known as "The Feeble Prodigy with Outstanding Instincts" because although physically weak and unenergetic, he is able to hit any ball with a single swing.
Eiji Uekusa (RF)
Extremely fast and athletic. One of two players not recruited to Hina.
Saku Natane (LF)
Earns good grades. One of two players not recruited to Hina.
Shiori Yokogi
Baseball team manager; first-year student. Because she helped her older brother train, she is skilled at hitting baseballs for fielding practice.

=== Shisen Gakusha University High School ===
Ataru Yoshizawa (RF)
Ibuki's friend from the golden generation and fellow first-year who helped organize the first practice game. Athletic leadoff hitter for Shisen Gakusha who also competes in the decathlon.
Tetsuo Yaotome (P)
Ace relief pitcher, third-year.
Kosuke Sakuma (P/RH)
Second-year pitcher with a good fastball and splitter.

=== Hosenka Jitsugyo (Hojitsu) High School ===
Aokaze Kuzumi (P/RH)
"The Nova" is the talented younger twin brother who pitches with a conventional delivery. He is known for his rising fastball. Considered one of the top four pitching talents in high school.
Ikazuchi Goya
Cleanup hitter.
Ryusei Amatsuji
Member of the "golden generation".
Sota Hori (C)
Kirihito Gunjo (P)

=== Shuzan High School ===
Mei Kurobuchi (P)
"The Grim Reaper" is considered one of the top four pitching talents in high school and is part of the "golden generation". He wears jersey number 1 as the team's ace pitcher.
Aran Seko (SS)
A "five-tool player" equal to Ataru (Shisen Gakusha)
Moko Nigoritani
A fearsome batter standing 199 cm (78 in) tall, said to rival Izakuchi Goya (Hojitsu)

=== Ryokusen High School ===
Miroku Nikaido
Captain; third-year
Sojuro Matsukasa (P/LH)
Second-year, cleanup batter; relief pitcher.

=== Other members of the Golden Generation ===
Ritsu Haruie (P)
"The Professor" is considered one of the top four pitching talents in high school and is part of the "golden generation".
Arashi Kokonoe (P)
"The Whiz Kid" is considered one of the top four pitching talents in high school and is part of the "golden generation".

== Publication ==
Written by Togo Goto and illustrated by Kento Matsuura, Harukaze Mound was initially a one-shot published in Shueisha's Weekly Shōnen Jump magazine 33rd issue in 2022, before being serialized in the same magazine starting in June 2025. Its serialization ended on January 26, 2026. For its serialization debut, the series was featured on the cover of Jump and a promotional video was published. As of April 2026, the chapters have been collected into four tankōbon volumes.

No.	Release date	ISBN
1	November 4, 2025	978-4-08-884789-4
1. "Opposite Twins" (真逆の双子, Magyaku no Futago); 2. "To New Ground" (新天地へ, Shin Tenchi e); 3. "Weapons" (武器, Buki); 4. "First Day of Clubs" (部活始動日, Bukatsu Shidō-bi); 5. "Five-Tool Player" (5ツールプレイヤー, 5 Tsūru Pureiyā); 6. "Letting Them Hit" (打たせられている, Uta se Rarete Iru); 7. "Clutch Hitter" (クラッチヒッター, Kuratchi Hittā); 8. "Nagihara's Proof" (凪春の証明, Nagiharu no Shōmei)
After watching a perfect game in the final at the Kōshien high school championship, twins Aokaze and Nagiharu Kuzumi set it as their goal. By middle school, Aokaze has become an elite pitcher, while Nagiharu lags behind. A new catcher, Ibuki Hayama, shows how large the gap is between the brothers, and later convinces Nagiharu to try a submarine delivery instead of mimicking Aokaze's form. Aokaze is recruited to perennial power Hojitsu High School, while Nagiharu follows Ibuki to a new team of "outsiders" starting up at Hinazakura ("Hina"). After intense offseason training, including skipping stones on the river, Nagiharu and Ibuki meet their teammates at Hina,; there, calm batter Kappei Wakamori, dismisses Nagiharu initially but he earns a strikeout and Wakamori's respect. As the season starts, Captain Ibuki announces their first practice game is against Shisen Gakusha, a top-four team from the East Tokyo district, and their first-year leadoff hitter Ataru Yoshizawa smacks a home run off a nervous Nagiharu; however, as the game continues, he settles down and gives up singles but no runs as the infield duo Urushibara and Wakamori turn double plays. Ibuki had laid out a strategy to have Nagiharu pitch low and outside, forcing Shisen Gakusha to collect grounders. In the 7th inning, with two on and two out, mercurial Hina batter Satomi hits a three-run home run off a split-finger fastball and Hina takes a 3-2 lead. When Nagiharu switches to his rising slider late in the game, he gets a second strike on Ataru's fourth at-bat.
2	January 5, 2026	978-4-08-884814-3
9. "Sink Your Teeth In" (喰らいつけよ, Kurai Tsuke yo); 10. "Good News" (新しいニュース, Atarashī Nyūsu); 11. "Choosing for Ourselves" (自分で選んだ, Jibun de Eranda); 12. "Kengo and Nagiharu" (堅護と凪春, Kengo to Nagiharu); 13. "Outfielder Nagiharu" (外野手・凪春, Gaiya-te Nagiharu); 14. "Dark Guy" (暗い人, Kurai Hito); 15. "Prepared to Throw It Away" (捨てる覚悟, Suteru Kakugo); 16. "Line Drive" (弾丸ライナー, Dangan Rainā); 17. "Samurai Batter" (侍打者, Samurai Dasha)
Ataru catches a piece of Nagiharu's fastball, but is thrown out at first by Wakamori, as Ibuki had anticipated. Ibuki catches a foul tip for the final out, giving Hina the victory. In the wake of their victory, Nagiharu promises to bring a new pitch to the next game against Ryokusen, the Chiba champions; elsewhere, Hojitsu takes on Shuzan and their phenomenal first-year pitcher, Mei Kurobuchi. Nagiharu calls Aokaze with words of encouragement, giving Aokaze the confidence to try a vertical slider. In the game between Hojitsu and Shuzan, after Aokaze and Mei pitch three no-run innings, Goya hits a home run to win it for Hojitsu. Ibuki mentions that he is waiting for Yanagi to rediscover his impressive swing; he would have played for Ryokusen had he not lost his swing. Yanagi sympathizes with Nagiharu's drive to learn a new pitch; when challenged by his old teammates, he says he has arrived to win. Yuma is named the starting pitcher for Hina and Nagiharu is moved to center field; Yanagi will bat cleanup. Ryokusen takes an early 2-0 lead on a fielder's error, but Nagiharu defuses the tension with his bellowing voice and Hina's defense improves. By the top of the 5th inning, Ryokusen has taken a 6–3 lead on a developing slugfest powered by their cleanup batter and relief pitcher, Sojuro Matsukasa; in contrast, Yanagi, the cleanup batter for Hina, finds himself beset by self-doubt. Nagiharu expresses faith in him. Nagiharu relieves Yuma, striking out Matsukasa with the rising slider. Nagiharu told Yanagi that he had to throw away all of his initial progress towards his new pitch, giving Yanagi the freedom to discard the well-meaning but unhelpful suggestions he has received for his swing. Nagiharu uses his new pitch, a hard sinker, to strike out Matsukasa again. Facing his former teammate Matsukasa in the bottom of the 7th, Yanagi connects solidly with a line drive that bounces off the center field wall, bringing two runs home and pulling Hina to within one run at 6–5. Celebrating together with his teammates, Yanagi says he has found a team he can trust. Nagiharu keeps Ryokusen from scoring and in the bottom of the 9th, Yanagi gets another base hit on a line drive with two out; Satomi hits into shallow right field as the potential game-winning run. The mysterious Iroha wakes.
3	March 4, 2026	978-4-08-884870-9
18. "Versus Ryokusen High School: Conclusion" (緑千高校戦 決着, Midori sen Kōkō-sen Ketchaku); 19. "Obey the Rules" (ルールは守ろう, Rūru wa Mamorou); 20. "Versus Izakuchi Goya" (VS 豪矢 雷, VS Izakuchi Goya); 21. "Super-Sadistic Coach?!" (ドSコーチ!?, Doesu Kōchi!?); 22. "The Official Season Approaches" (近づく公式戦, Chikadzuku Kōshiki-sen); 23. "First Official Game" (初戦, Shosen); 24. "Sweet Dream" (甘い夢, Amai Yume); 25. "Preparation for Slaughter" (殺す準備, Korosu Junbi); 26. "Moko-Tan" (モコたん, Moko-Tan)
After watching two strikes, Iroha uses a back-leg kick to drive Satomi in, tying the game, but is tagged out and the game ends as they had agreed to not play extra innings. On the bus home, Nagiharu and Yanagi fall asleep. The Hina High players run into a group of bullies from Hojitsu at the batting center, but Nagiharu humiliates them in the challenge cage. Aokaze arrives late and challenges Nagiharu with their cleanup hitter, Ikazuchi Goya, who shocks everyone by hitting Nagiharu's rising slider. Nagiharu excuses himself for extra practice. Ibuki notes that Aokaze is now showing inspiration from Nagiharu's pitching. Hima hires Midori Yokogi, Shiori's cousin and a "sadistic" coach who starts by sharply criticizing the team. Ibuki recognizes her reverse psychology and they have a long discussion after practice; she asks about his knee injury, saying his physical recovery has not been matched by regaining the selfish mindset to work on his own development. Underestimated in their first Kōshien regional tournament game, Hina prevails 7–0 over Kinugasa and advance to face Shuzan. Nagiharu demonstrates a confusing combination of optimism and pessimism. Mei Kurobuchi, a Shuzan first-year player and Ibuki's former battery mate, says Shuzan will win and doubts Ibuki's commitment to enter Kōshien, saying Ibuki should have enrolled in a high school with an established team like Shuzan.
4	April 3, 2026	978-4-08-885068-9
27. "Ibuki, the Right-Handed Batter" (右打者 伊吹, Migi Dasha Ibuki); 28. "Roles" (役割, Yakuwari); 29. "Harukazeball" (ハルカゼボール, Harukazebōru); 30. "Harukaze Mound" (ハルカゼマウンド, Harukaze Mound); Special One Shot. "Harukaze Promise" (ハルカゼの約束, Harukaze no Yakusoku)
Ibuki had switched to batting left after his injury. After gaining confidence in his recovery with a cheer from Yuma, he bats Maisuke in safely on a wicked inside curve from Mei. Nagiharu continues to hold Shuzan scoreless into the bottom of the 9th inning. With two out, Moko comes up to bat again. Aokaze, watching the televised game, says his older brother gets stronger with adversity, recalling how they had to keep fighting on after their mother died when they were young. Nagiharu strikes out Moko on three successive balls with overhand, submarine, and flutter pitches, taking advantage of the slugger's aggressiveness with a deceptively slow ball. After the win, Hina goes on to beat Shisen Gakusha 3-2 in the regional final and advances to Kōshien, where they face off with Hojitsu in the third round. Aokaze welcomes Nagiharu "home" to the pitching mound, fulfilling their childhood promise.

== See also ==
- Phantom Seer, another series by the same creators
