= Enigma (manga) =

Japanese manga series

- First tankōbon volume cover

エニグマ (Eniguma)
- Genre: Mystery; Supernatural; Suspense
- Manga
- Written by: Kenji Sakaki
- Published by: Shueisha
- Imprint: Jump Comics
- Magazine: Weekly Shōnen Jump; Jump Next! (final chapter)
- Original run: September 13, 2010 – December 26, 2011
- Volumes: 7
- icon

Enigma (Japanese: エニグマ, Hepburn: Eniguma), stylized as ǝnígmǝ, is a Japanese manga written and illustrated by Kenji Sakaki. It was serialized in Shueisha's shōnen manga magazine Weekly Shōnen Jump magazine from September 2010 to October 2011, with its last chapter published in Jump Next! in December of that same year; its chapters were collected in seven tankōbon volumes.

== Story ==
Haiba Sumio is a student at a Tokyo High School with a special ability; he occasionally falls asleep and wakes up with premonitions of the future written out on his "Dream Diary". With this ability, Sumio helps out people in trouble before anything bad happens, until one day when his peaceful life completely changes.

== Characters ==
Sumio Haiba (灰葉スミオ, Haiba Sumio)
A first-year student, class A. His ability is the Dream Diary. He refers to the Dream Diary as a way to help change the current fate and when people are in trouble he refers to it as a "Mayday". After being taken into the E-Test, Sumio becomes the de facto leader of the group, as he appears to have the most training with his ability and possesses a willingness to help others in danger. It has been since revealed that his actual ability is telepathy, and that combined with Shigeru's precognition allows him to record the future.
Shigeru Kurumiya (来宮しげる, Kurumiya Shigeru)
A first-year student, class A. Her ability is precognition, which when combined with Sumio's telepathy allows the Dream Diary to work. Shigeru is Sumio's childhood friend. Despite this, Sumio, or herself, never knew she had an ability and openly wonders why Shigeru is taking the E-Test.
Aru Mizusawa (水沢アル, Mizusawa Aru)
A second-year student, class H. When he was captured he was in a costume he was wearing for a part-time job as a police mascot. It's later revealed that his ability allows him to transform in his costume, called Pit-Kun. With his ability, he can also change his size, growing to huge proportions and even fly. He discovered his ability after he was in a tragic accident, leaving his body practically immobile. But after being inspired by the heroics of Pit-Kun, he transformed into the character and dedicates his life to save people.
Moto Hasekura (支倉モト, Hasekura Moto)
A first-year student, class E. A member of the baseball team, his ability is to make things turn invisible/disappear when frightened. This does not extend to just physical objects, as he can also make people in photographs disappear to see what is behind them. He refers to his power as a curse and has a strong desire to get rid of it, however after seeing his ability being useful to the group, his opinions change. His motto is that he always takes the safest path in life.
Jiro Matsurigi (祀木ジロウ, Matsurigi Jirō)
A third-year student, class B. His ability is Cubic Subtraction. With this ability he can reduce the measurements of objects at his will. The only conditions of this ability are that he cannot add to the object and it does not affect humans. He is the first in this E-Test to be captured by a Shadow. Once he was saved, he had the choice to swallow a pill to stop the Shadow transformation. Instead of swallowing the pill, he saves it to force Kurisu Ryo to take it and save him. It is explained that he has already taken place in a past E-Test as the sole survivor and wanted to take place in another to save Kurisu, who was trapped.
Hiina Kujoin (九条院ひいな, Kujōin Hiina)
A second-year student, class C. Her ability is an invisible third hand. With the third hand, she can move small objects and often uses the ability to check each room for safety reasons. Despite being invisible, the hand always leaves small hand prints among the surface of what it touches. Her family is apparently a zaibatsu that had ties to the Queen Airlines plane crash, so she was originally a loner and preferred to keep to herself while using her ability to prevent the other students from playing cruel pranks on her. She seems to be developing feelings for Sumio.
Takemaru Sudo (崇藤タケマル, Sudō Takemaru)
A third-year student, class G. His ability allows him to "rewind" things making them return to the past. He is very strong but stubborn. Due to his stepfather's abusiveness (an episode of which caused the large scar on his back that is the root of his powers) and being forced to apologize for no reason, he has an intense disdain for anything irrational.
Ryo Kurisu (栗須リョウ, Kurisu Ryō)
A second year at Yuyami High as of two years ago. His ability is Flat, which allows the user to enter a flat world, such as a picture, and interact with its contents. He initially tricks the party into believing that he is Mizusawa Aru, but it is later revealed he was one of the students who failed the second E-Test. Where before his personality mirrored that of Sumio, as time went on his group turned on him and was swallowed by Shadows during the test. This left only Jiro and himself, but Ryo was ambushed by Shadows right before escaping, leaving Jiro as the only survivor. While there, the Shadows corroded his good beliefs with selfish and cruel desires to escape with any means. It was not until Jiro gave him the pill did he return to his normal self again.
Enigma (エニグマ, Eniguma)
The mysterious controller of the E-Test. He is represented by the symbol of a human skull with the jaw in the opposite direction (resembling a lower case e), but it is later revealed by Jiro that Enigma is indeed human with a noticeable mark on his right hand. Enigma's identity is finally unveiled to be Kirio Imizuka, a childhood friend of Sumio, but the mantle is later passed to Sumio himself to further Kirio's goals.
Yuta Kijima (綺島ユウタ, Kijima Yūta)
A teacher at Yuyami High School, Kijima's pleasant personality makes him popular with students, but it is all a 'façade' that masks an insane obsession with developing the abilities of others by subjecting them to the E-Tests. It is initially believed that he is Enigma, but Sumio discovers later that he is acting in proxy. It was revealed at the end of E-Test that his obsession with developing abilities of others and creating a stage of E-Test are all due to the wish Kirio made on Enigma skull, which Kijima could not disobey. Kijima is in fact a kind gentleman trying to protect the people with abilities and to protect Kirio from the curse that Enigma skull brings. His ability is manipulation of the alternate Yuyami High's orientation and physical properties through a laptop in the real world.
Kirio Imizuka (忌束キリヲ, Imizuka Kiriwo)
A silent boy who used to be Shigeru and Sumio's friend, Kirio inherited the Enigma skull from his father and thus gained its powers. After obtaining it, he was stabbed in the throat and broadcast a cry for help, turning those that heard it into ability users and thus catalyzing the plot. Although Kirio survived, he later would be convicted for the hijacking and crashing of an airplane which killed all others aboard, and was sentenced to life in prison. The E-Tests were thus brought about for him to get revenge on the actual hijacker. Yuta Kijima is his stepbrother.
Kei Suki (数奇ケイ, Sūki Kei)
A classmate of Sumio's and an ardent occultist. Kei is roped into the E-Test via the delivery of a cellphone that facilitates a telepathic connection between him and Sumio. He maintains a webpage about urban legends and is familiar with the story of Enigma, which he knows under the name of the "Handprint Phantom".
Ami Yumikawa (弓河あみ, Yumikawa Ami)
The extremely kind nurse of Yuyami High, Yumikawa was one of the people to hear Kirio's cry and become an ability user. She was later convicted for the murder of a student and was sent to jail: however, Kijima later reveals that he framed her because her ability (attracting other ability users) would put her life in danger. Both Sudo and Kijima had feelings for her.

== Publication ==
Written and illustrated by Kenji Sakaki, Enigma was serialized in Shueisha's shōnen manga magazine Weekly Shōnen Jump magazine from September 13, 2010, to October 31, 2011; its last chapter was published in Jump Next! on December 26 of that same year. Shueisha collected its 56 chapters in seven tankōbon volumes released from December 29, 2010, to February 3, 2012.

=== Volumes ===
No.	Title	Release date	ISBN
1	e-test	December 29, 2010	978-4-08-870168-4
01. "7" (「7」, Sebun); 02. "Close" (クローズ, Kurōzu); 03. "Invisible" (インビジブル, Inbijiburu); 04. "Hand" (ハンド, Hando); 05. "Water" (ウォーター, Uōtā); 06. "Puzzle" (パズル, Pazuru); 07. "Choice" (チョイス, Choisu)
2	Out; Auto (アウト)	March 4, 2011	978-4-08-870196-7
08. "Debunk" (ディバンク, Dibanku); 09. "Reduce" (リデュース, Ridyūsu); 10. "Confession" (コンフェッション, Konfesshon); 11. "Plan" (プラン, Puran); 12. "Flat" (フラット, Furatto); 13. "Movement" (ムーブメント, Mūbumento); 14. "Trust" (トラスト, Torasuto); 15. "Before" (ビフォー, Bifō); 16. "Out" (アウト, Auto)
3	Another; Anazā (アナザー)	June 3, 2011	978-4-08-870238-4
17. "Meeting" (ミーティング, Mītingu); 18. "Lunar" (ルーナー, Rūnā); 19. "Clock" (クロック, Kurokku); 20. "Change" (チェンジ, Chenji); 21. "Gear" (ギア, Gia); 22. "Telephone" (テレフォン, Terefon); 23. "Another" (アナザー, Anazā); 24. "Classic" (クラシック, Kurashikku); 25. "Labyrinth" (ラビリンス, Rabirinsu)
4	Open; Ōpun (オープン)	August 4, 2011	978-4-08-870276-6
26. "Scar" (スカー, Sukā); 27. "Monitor" (モニター, Monitā); 28. "Important" (インポータント, Inpōtanto); 29. "Together" (トゥギャザー, Tugyazā); 30. "Tear" (ティア, Tia); 31. "Open" (オープン, Ōpun); 32. "Shadow" (シャドー, Shadō); 33. "Alone" (アローン, Arōn); 34. "Prediction" (プレディクション, Puredikushon)
5	Mayday; Mēdē (メーデー)	October 4, 2011	978-4-08-870297-1
35. "First" (ファースト, Fāsuto); 36. "Telepath" (テレパス, Terepasu); 37. "Memories" (メモリーズ, Memorīzu); 38. "Last" (ラスト, Rasuto); 39. "Exit" (イグジット, Igujitto); 40. "Enigma" (エニグマ, Eniguma); 41. "Mayday" (メーデー, Mēdē); 42. "Succession" (サクセション, Sakuseshon); 43. "Realize" (リアライズ, Riaraizu)
6	Cannibal; Kanibaru (カニバル)	December 2, 2011	978-4-08-870297-1
44. "Train" (トレイン, Torein); 45. "Enemy" (エネミー, Enemī); 46. "Ticket" (チケット, Chiketto); 47. "Coin" (コイン, Koin); 48. "Uncovered" (アンカバード, Ankabādo); 49. "Prison" (プリズン, Purizun); 50. "Key" (キー, Kī); 51. "Cannibal" (カニバル, Kanibaru)
7	True End; Tōrū Endo (トゥルーエンド)	February 3, 2012	978-4-08-870297-1
52. "Coffin" (コフィン, Kofin); 53. "Past" (パスト, Pasuto); 54. "Island" (アイランド, Airando); 55. "Twilight" (トワイライト, Towairaito); 56. "True End" (トゥルーエンド, Tōrū Endo)

== Reception ==
The third, fourth, fifth, and seven volumes debuted on Oricon's weekly manga chart.
