= Jurassic Shadows =

Japanese anime series

竜化粧の忍 (Ryugeshō no Shinobi)
- Genre: Action
- Created by: SANB
- Anime
- Directed by: Norihiro Naganuma
- Written by: Kenta Ihara
- Music by: Shūhei Mutsuki
- Studio: Cannon Code

Jurassic Shadows (Japanese: 竜化粧の忍, Hepburn: Ryugeshō no Shinobi) is an upcoming original Japanese anime series created by SANB, produced by Slow Curve and Avex Pictures and animated by Cannon Code. It is directed by Norihiro Naganuma and written by Kenta Ihara, with Shūhei Mutsuki composing the music. Original character designs are provided by Yōichi Amano, while Yukiko Nakatani adapt the designs for animation. A manga adaptation published by Kodansha has also been announced.
