= Magico (manga) =

Japanese manga series

- First tankōbon volume cover

マジコ (Majiko)
- Genre: Fantasy
- Manga
- Written by: Naoki Iwamoto
- Published by: Shueisha
- Imprint: Jump Comics
- Magazine: Weekly Shōnen Jump
- Original run: February 28, 2011 – July 2, 2012
- Volumes: 8
- icon

Magico (Japanese: マジコ, Hepburn: Majiko) is a Japanese manga series written and illustrated by Naoki Iwamoto. It was serialized in Shueisha's Weekly Shōnen Jump from February 2011 to July 2012, with its chapters collected into eight tankōbon volumes. The series follows the story of Shion and Emma to complete the magic ritual "Magico" to seal away the power of Echidna, a dreadful and extremely powerful magic dormant inside Emma's body.

== Plot ==
Emma, a country girl, first came to the city to start a new life after having been isolated since early childhood. But for some reason, when she entered the city all the young men and even the king tried to forcibly marry her. And when it seemed that there was no hope left but to marry the king, a dragon comes crashing into the room. To everyone's surprise, a young man named Shion comes out of the dragon's mouth. He "saves" her and they leave. Later on he explains to Emma about her history and how she is the legendary Echidna, a power born every 500 years so devastating that in the wrong hands, could mean the destruction of the world. Shion goes on to tell her that she will be a target to all mages that seek her power. He goes on to speak of a ritual that could change her destiny. This ritual is called Magico, and to complete this ritual they would have to perform and complete many difficult tasks to seal the magic of Echidna away. The first of which is to marry Shion.

== Characters ==
Shion Elphias Levi (シオン・エリファス・レヴィ, Shion Erifasu Revi)
Voiced by: Romi Park (drama CD)
He is one of the three strongest mages in the Eaglyas, known as the Sages of the West, and knew Emma from when they were both children from when she fed him when he was starving to death. She is the reason he became a mage and he wants nothing more than to protect her. Though he appears strong in the beginning, it is revealed he has low self confidence and does not want anyone to find out about his hidden past. He worked hard to become a mage and has a specific type of magic he likes best. Shion travels around in a dragon which has a house and many other rooms inside of it. He also cares for Emma very deeply, although he does not like to admit.
Emma (エマ, Ema)
Voiced by: Ai Kayano (drama CD)
The heroine of this series with a natural and pure trusting toward others. As her body houses the Echidna, which has the power to destroy the world, she must often travel around the world in search of different items that can be used for Magico. She was isolated in seclusion from childhood, forced to live under house arrest, however she does not know why. Emma's life is constantly threatened by those who seek to kill her and claim the power of Echidna for themselves. In cooperation with Shion, they plan to seal Echidna and prevent it from awakening while also saving her life. She has grown strong feelings for Shion, but she tries to hide this fact, although she is not very good at it.
Luu (ルー, Rū)
An orphan who resided in the outlands before meeting Shion and Emma. Her town, which had always distrusted her, used her as a sacrifice thinking it would change their luck. She survived the fall and had been living alone in the wilderness until she met Shion and Emma. She uses the powerful magic named Palm Exchange Magic. Because of the strength of this magic, Luu can also grow in age, but she cannot do it for very long and becomes weak for a long time afterwards. She becomes adopted by Shion and Emma after aiding them in one of their rituals and becomes the little sister of Anise. She is usually warm-hearted but can be very aggressive towards those who threaten her new family.
Anise (アニス, Anisu)
Voiced by: Mai Yamane (drama CD)
A speaking female black cat wearing a red collar with bells hanging off. She has a wealth of knowledge, often to the description of a number of different magic and rituals. She is also a supporter to Shion and approves of his relationship with Emma, however, she often teases him about how he is not entirely open with his feelings, which often annoys him. However, she also has calm and loving personality, and she is known for never asking irrelevant questions.
Sieg (ジーク, Jīku)
Voiced by: Masahiro Iwasaki (drama CD)
A green dragon which Shion uses for transportation. He is depicted as wearing sunglasses. Shion found and raised him from an egg. Shion, Emma, and Luu use his body as a residence and main source of transportation. He appears to have an unlimited amount of rooms inside of him, and he gains no damage from anything destroyed inside of him. Sieg is also a holy dragon, and if somebody enters his body he can nullify any curses.

== Media ==
=== Manga ===
Magico is written and illustrated by Naoki Iwamoto. The series was serialized in Shueisha's Weekly Shōnen Jump from February 28, 2011, to July 2, 2012. An additional chapter was published in Jump Next! on August 11, 2012. Shueisha collected its chapters in eight tankōbon volumes, released from July 4, 2011, to October 4, 2012.

==== Volumes ====
No.	Release date	ISBN
1	July 4, 2011	978-4-08-870262-9
2	September 2, 2011	978-4-08-870290-2
3	December 2, 2011	978-4-08-870308-4
4	February 3, 2012	978-4-08-870377-0
5	April 4, 2012	978-4-08-870406-7
6	June 4, 2012	978-4-08-870432-6
7	August 3, 2012	978-4-08-870481-4
8	October 4, 2012	978-4-08-870520-0
