= Phantom Seer =

Japanese manga series

- First tankōbon volume cover, featuring Iori Katanagi (front), Yayoi Katanagi (left), Kenma Oigawa (top right), Yojirou Satake (bottom right) and Riku Aibetsu (back)

仄見える少年 (Honomieru Shōnen)
- Genre: Action, horror
- Manga
- Written by: Togo Goto
- Illustrated by: Kento Matsuura
- Published by: Shueisha
- English publisher: NA: Viz Media
- Imprint: Jump Comics
- Magazine: Weekly Shōnen Jump
- Original run: August 31, 2020 – April 5, 2021
- Volumes: 4
- icon

Phantom Seer (Japanese: 仄見える少年, Hepburn: Honomieru Shōnen) is a Japanese manga series written by Togo Goto and illustrated by Kento Matsuura. It was serialized in Shueisha's Weekly Shōnen Jump from August 2020 to April 2021, with its chapters collected in four tankōbon volumes. It was published digitally in English by Viz Media and Manga Plus.

== Plot ==
The story follows Iori Katanagi, a medium who is very unmotivated to do his job. However, upon meeting Riku Aibetsu, he may have a chance to find a long lost foe.

== Characters ==
Iori Katanagi (片儺木 伊織, Katanagi Iori)
Iori is unmotivated, lazy and obnoxious. He hates being a shaman and desires to be normal, but is often forced to do jobs by his sister. However, he is a caring person deep down, who will protect people, even if it costs his life. He has tamed the phantom Ongyoki, which gives him power over shadows. He despises Senjudoji and wants to destroy her out of anger for killing someone close to him.
Riku Aibetsu (哀別 理久, Aibetsu Riku)
Riku is a girl who likes helping people. At first, she thought she had the sixth sense to detect danger, when in reality, she is a Beckoning Hand, meaning she attracts phantoms. However, this does not weaken her resolve and even begins training to be a shaman so she can help people.
Yayoi Katanagi (片儺木 弥生, Katanagi Yayoi)
Iori's older sister. She is a powerful shaman and has multiple abilities, including clairvoyance, mind reading and the ability to obliterate phantoms. She often forces her brother to do jobs. She is often seen smiling and has a slightly playful personality. Her Phantom's abilities are related to eyes.
Kenma Oigawa (大井川 研真, Ōigawa Kenma)
Kenma is gentlemanly, respectful and serious, the exact opposite of Iori. He wants Iori to take his job more seriously. He has tamed Tengu, which allows him to manipulate sound waves.
Chihiro Kurose (黒瀬 千尋, Kurose Chihiro)
The self proclaimed "Young Star of the Shaman World". He is flashy and is usually seen flirting with women, but takes his job as a Shaman seriously. He has an unnamed phantom that grants him pyrokinetic abilities, but only if he has a source, such as a lighter.
Senjudoji (千住ドジ)
Senjudoji is a phantom that takes the form of a little girl. She is sadistic, cruel and arrogant. She is currently hunting Beckoning Hands.

== Publication ==
Written by Togo Goto and illustrated by Kento Matsuura, Phantom Seer was first published as a one-shot in Shueisha's Jump Giga in 2017, and in Weekly Shōnen Jump in September of the following year, where it won the 2018 Golden Future Cup competition. It was serialized in Weekly Shōnen Jump from August 31, 2020, to April 5, 2021. Shueisha collected its chapters in four individual tankōbon volumes, released on December 4, 2020, to July 2, 2021.

The series was published digitally in English language by Viz Media and Manga Plus. In February 2022, Viz Media announced that they would releasing volumes digitally, with all volumes being released on August 23, 2022.

=== Volumes ===
No.	Original release date	Original ISBN	English release date	English ISBN
1	December 4, 2020	978-4-08-882515-1	August 23, 2022	978-1-9747-2360-7
01. "The Boy with Psychic Powers"; 02. "His Existence Is Reduced to a Glimmer"; 03. "Name"; 04. "The Mirror Phantom"; 05. "Tengu Sitter"; 06. "Their Relationship"; 07. "Visit to Tsukuyomi Mansion"
2	February 4, 2021	978-4-08-882551-9	August 23, 2022	978-1-9747-3377-4
08. "A Girl's Resolution"; 09. "Case of the Disappearing Beckoning Hands"; 10. "Iori Motivated"; 11. "Reunion in a Dark Hole"; 12. "I'll Leave It to You"; 13. "Win or Lose"; 14. "Tsumuji Komachi"; 15. "Tsumuji's Request"; 16. "Hybrid"
3	April 30, 2021	978-4-08-882641-7	August 23, 2022	978-1-9747-3378-1
17. "If I Could Be Special; 18. "Resolve"; 19. "A Real Conversation"; 20. "A Normal Human"; 21. "Precursor to a Disaster"; 22. "Dollhouse"; 23. "The Phantom of the Dollhouse"; 24. "Dollhouse Basement"; 25. "The Puppet Master"
4	July 2, 2021	978-4-08-882711-7	August 23, 2022	978-1-9747-3379-8
26. "The Way the Tengu Master Fights"; 27. "The Girl Who Lives with Dolls"; 28. "Fuuka Yukizuki"; 29. "I Can Fight"; 30. "Those Who See a Phantom; Bonus Chapter: "Lonely Nights"; Original One Shot: "Phantom Seer"

== Reception ==
In December 2020, it was reported that the first volume of Phantom Seer performed well, as their initial amount printed sold out leading to a reprint.
