= Doron Dororon =

Japanese manga series

- First tankōbon volume cover, featuring Dora Sasaki (left) and Kusanagi (right)

ドロンドロロン
- Genre: Dark fantasy
- Manga
- Written by: Gen Oosuka
- Published by: Shueisha
- English publisher: NA: Viz Media
- Imprint: Jump Comics
- Magazine: Weekly Shōnen Jump
- Original run: November 29, 2021 – August 29, 2022
- Volumes: 5
- icon

Doron Dororon (ドロンドロロン) is a Japanese manga series written and illustrated by Gen Oosuka. It was serialized in Weekly Shōnen Jump from November 2021 to August 2022, and its chapters have been collected into five tankōbon volumes.

== Plot ==
In a world where destructive creatures called Mononoke exist, a group called The Izanagi Force was created to combat these evil creatures. Dora Sasaki wishes to be a samurai to avenge the death of his mother, but finds that he cannot due to not having any supernatural energy. However, this changes when he meets a Mononoke called Kusanagi, who is pure-hearted and wishes to create a kind world. Together, they fight against the Mononoke and protect humanity.

== Characters ==
=== Main ===
Dora Sasaki
A boy who wishes to slay mononoke after his mother was killed in an attack. He has no supernatural energy, but makes up for it with raw strength and incredible stamina.With the help of Kusanagi, he is able to eliminate mononoke.
Kusanagi
A pure-hearted mononoke who wishes to create a peaceful and a kind world. He is incredibly weak, but can shapeshift. He usually takes the form of a katana.
Ginchiyo Yagyu
A prideful girl who works for the Izanagi Force. She recruits Dora and Kusanagi after seeing their potential.
Heisuke Ujii
A samurai officer. He is very vain, and is always looking for praise. However, he is incredibly strong, and able to kill high-level momonoke.
Touma Toda
A samurai and Dora and Kusanagi's rival. He would get into fights with Dora a lot in the past, only to be immediately defeated every time.
Naotora Kamizumi
A shy and frequently embarrassed female samurai and Dora and Kusanagi's patrol partner. She has a crush on Dora, which is a secret that only Kusanagi knows.
Yuusai Yagyu
A Battalion Commander at Izanagi Corps.
Goki Tsukahara
The founder and former head of Izanagi Corps. Despite his old age, he can defeat multiple samurai simultaneously and with ease.
Hanzo Miyamoto
The man who brought mononoke into the world fifty years before the events of the manga. Not much is known about him, other than that his face is covered in black bandages and that he used to train alongside Tsukahara.
Namishiro Kitabatake
A samurai at Izanagi Corps. He uses a supernatural technique that "watches his back" when he fights.

=== Mononoke ===
Hanya Gyuuki
The first major mononoke to appear in the manga; he is an ushi-oni who can shoot poisonous spines from his abdomen. He is defeated by Dora and killed by Hidehisa.
Hidehisa
One of the four humanoid mononoke hiding in Mushashino-kuni whose supernatural technique allows him to sprout snake-like appendages from his back and fire projectiles from them. After learning of Yoshihime's death, he fights Heisuke, and is killed when he is slashed in half and destroyed by Heisuke's supernatural energy.
Yoshihime
One of the four humanoid mononoke hiding in Mushashino-kuni whose supernatural technique allows her to produce webs on a massive scale. She fights Heisuke, and is killed when he cuts her in half and destroys her using his supernatural energy.
Tameemon
One of the four humanoid mononoke hiding in Mushashino-kuni whose supernatural technique allows him to increase his physical strength by consuming alcohol. He fights Dora and Touma, and is killed when the former uses Kusanagi's spirit energy to cut him clean in half.
Kanbeh
The leader of the four humanoid mononoke hiding in Mushashino-kuni, implied to be of great power. His supernatural technique allows him to conjure dark fire. After seemingly sacrificing himself in an explosion in an attempt to kill Heisuke, it is later revealed that he is actually alive and operating elsewhere.
Dosan
A mononoke with an elephant-like nose who is hired by Kanbeh to capture Dora and Kusanagi. His supernatural technique allows him to create large amounts of fog that can distract opponents, create mirages, and revive deceased mononoke as lifeless pawns. He is later disintegrated by Kanbeh using a special ore.

== Publication ==
Written and illustrated by Gen Oosuka, the series was serialized in Shueisha's Weekly Shōnen Jump magazine from November 29, 2021, to August 29, 2022. The series' individual chapters have been collected into five tankōbon volumes, released from April to October 2022.

The series was simultaneously published in English by Viz Media and Shueisha's Manga Plus online platform. Viz Media released all five volumes digitally in September 2024.

=== Volumes ===
No.	Original release date	Original ISBN	English release date	English ISBN
1	April 4, 2022	978-4-08-883119-0	September 24, 2024	978-1-9747-3608-9
1. "Samurai and Mononoke" (侍とモノノケ, Samurai to Mononoke); 2. "Stray Leek Samurai" (野良ネギ侍, Nora Negi Samurai); 3. "Ginchiyo Yagyu" (柳生ギンチヨ); 4. "Combined Strength" (ふたりの強さ, Futari no Tsuyo-sa); 5. "Cooperation" (協力, Kyōryoku); 6. "Blackout" (暗転, Anten); 7. "Together" (ふたりで, Futari de)
2	June 3, 2022	978-4-08-883180-0	September 24, 2024	978-1-9747-5030-6
8. "Friends" (ダチ, Dachi); 9. "That Kind of Organism" (そーゆー生態, Sōyū Seitai); 10. "Samurai Officer" (上士侍, Jōshi Samurai); 11. "Superhero" (スーパーヒーロー, Sūpāhīrō); 12. "Provisional Samurai" (仮侍, Kari Samurai); 13. "Touma Toda" (冨田トウマ, Toda Touma); 14. "Plot" (企み, Takurami); 15. "Ichiha Kobayakawa" (小早川イチハ, Kobayakawa Ichiha); 16. "Plan Guts" (根性作戦, Konjō Sakusen)
3	September 2, 2022	978-4-08-883229-6	September 24, 2024	978-1-9747-5031-3
17. "Sword and Shield" (刀と盾, Katana to Tate); 18. "Rage" (怒り, Ikari); 19. "Real Superheroes" (真のスーパーヒーロー, Shin no Sūpāhīrō); 20. "Naotora Kamiizumi" (上泉ナオトラ, Kamiizumi Naotora); 21. "Daily Training" (日々寔鍛練, Hibi Koretanren); 22. "Reunion" (再会, Saikai); 23. "I Don't Want To Lose You" (失いたくない, Ushinaitakunai); 24. "I'm Glad You're Here" (いて良かった, Ite Yokatta); 25. "Ironclad Double King" (金剛二王, Kongō Niō)
4	October 4, 2022	978-4-08-883324-8	September 24, 2024	978-1-9747-5032-0
26. "True Friends" (真の友人, Shin no Yūjin); 27. "Goki Tsukahara" (塚原ゴウキ, Tsukahara Gōki); 28. "Hanzo Miyamoto" (宮本ハンゾウ, Miyamoto Hanzō); 29. "Namishiro Kitabatake" (北畠 ナミシロウ, Kitabatake Namishirou); 30. "Night of the New Moon" (新月の夜, Shingetsu no Yoru); 31. "Traitor" (裏切り者, Uragirimono)
5	October 4, 2022	978-4-08-883325-5	September 24, 2024	978-1-9747-5033-7
32. "The Final Fortress" (最後の砦, Saigo no Toride); 33. "Samurai Officers" (上士侍達, Jōshi Samurai-tachi); 34. "Big Brother Hanzo" (ハンゾウ兄さん, Hanzō Nii-san); 35. "Seal" (印, In); 36. "A Happy, Kind World" (しあわせな優しい世界へ, Shiawase na Yasashii Sekai e)

== Reception ==
Christian Markle from CBR praised the series. He felt the main protagonist was similar to Black Clover's Asta, while also feeling the overall plot drew from My Hero Academia and Jujutsu Kaisen. Despite that, he felt they were different enough to make the series feel unique. Steven Blackburn from Screen Rant also offered some praise, though worried the series would take some elements of the plot of Ghost Reaper Girl that he did not like.
