= Namie Odama =

Japanese manga artist

Namie Odama (尾玉なみえ), born June 1, 1979, in Osaka Prefecture, known as "Namie-han" to her fans, is a Japanese gag manga artist. Her works have been featured in Shueisha's magazine Weekly Shōnen Jump and, more recently, its sister publications Business Jump, Ultra Jump and Young Jump.

Odama says she "became a manga artist because [she] can't do anything else". She debuted in the autumn of 1995 after winning an honorable mention for the Afternoon Shiki Shō prize, given out by Kodansha's manga magazine Monthly Afternoon. She also was the runner-up for the Akatsuka Award in 2000 for her manga Junjō Pine.

== Works (in chronological order) ==
=== Series ===
- 2000-2001 Junjō Pine (純情パイン)
- 2002 Shōnen Esper Nejime (少年エスパーねじめ)
- 2003 Idol Jigokuhen (アイドル地獄変)
- 2004 Spar Takashi (スパル・たかし)
- 2006 Saru no Ko Pepe (サルの子ペペ)
- 2007- Mako-chan no Lip Cream (マコちゃんのリップクリーム)
- 2009- Taorete Tōtoshi! (たおれて尊し!)

=== Short stories ===
- 2008 Robo Gattai Basukon 3 (ロボ合体バスコン3)

=== Short story collections ===
- 2005 Romantic Shokudō (ロマンティック食堂)
