= Yōichi Amano =

Japanese manga artist

Yōichi Amano (天野 洋一, Amano Yōichi; born June 22, 1981) is a Japanese manga artist from Setouchi in Okayama Prefecture.

== Works ==
- Akaboshi: Ibun Suikoden - part of anthology Weekly Shōnen Jump
- Cross Beat
- Live Alive
- Over Time - part of anthology Weekly Shōnen Jump
- Season Call
- Usagi to Kame to Strike
- Asobi mono
- Examurai (エグザムライ, Eguzamurai)
- Stealth Symphony (with Ryohgo Narita)
- Ana No Mujina
- Mist Gears Blast
- Dragon Quest Treasures: Another Adventure Fadora no Takarajima
- Metaphor: ReFantazio (メタファー：リファンタジオ)
- Jurassic Shadows (竜化粧の忍, Ryugeshō no Shinobi) - original character designs
