= Jump (magazine line) =

Line of manga magazines created by Shueisha

- Trade name: Shōnen Jump
- Native name: ジャンプ
- Romanized name: Janpu
- Founded: 1968; 58 years ago
- Founder: Shueisha
- Headquarters: Japan
- Website: Official Shueisha history page

Jump (Japanese: ジャンプ, Hepburn: Janpu), also known as Jump Comics, is a line of manga anthologies (manga magazines) created by Shueisha. It began with Shōnen Jump manga anthology in 1968, later renamed Weekly Shōnen Jump. The origin of the name is unknown. The Jump anthologies are primarily intended for a teen male audience, although the Weekly Shōnen Jump magazine has also been popular with the female demographic. Along with the line of manga anthologies, Shōnen Jump also includes a crossover media franchise, where there have been various Shōnen Jump themed crossover anime and video games (since Famicom Jump), which bring together various Shōnen Jump manga characters.

== History ==
In 1949, Shueisha got into the business of making manga magazines, the first being Omoshiro Book. In 1951, Shueisha created a female version of that anthology entitled Shōjo Book. Shōjo Book led to the publication of the highly successful Shōjo manga magazine: Ribon. Omoshiro Book went out of print and Shueisha decided to make another male version of their successful Shōjo Book to even it out and made the magazine Shōnen Book. In the middle of Shōnen Book's publication, Shōnen Jump began its run (at the time was a Semiweekly magazine and had no "Weekly"). Shōnen Book ended when Shōnen Jump became a Weekly magazine correctly changing its name to Weekly Shōnen Jump. In 1969, a special issue called Bessatsu Shōnen Jump took Shōnen Book's place. In addition to the success of Weekly Shōnen Jump, Shueisha created a Seinen version of the magazine in 1979, called Young Jump (now Weekly Young Jump). Bessatsu Shōnen Jump, later got renamed Monthly Shōnen Jump and became a magazine of its own. The seasonal issues of Weekly Shōnen Jump are now called Akamaru Jump. In 1985, Shueisha started the publication of two business related manga magazines; a salaryman Jump magazine called Business Jump and an office lady manga magazine called Office You, also in 1988 started the publication of Super Jump. Many other Seinen related Jump magazines, started as spin-off issues of the Weekly Young Jump magazine. In 1993, Shueisha announced and released the video game/manga magazine V Jump alongside the Jump light novel line Jump j-Books. In 2003, Shogakukan's Viz Media released an English version of Weekly Shōnen Jump called Shonen Jump. Monthly Shōnen Jump discontinued in 2007, and was replaced with the Jump SQ. magazine, four series from the magazine were moved. In addition to the Jump SQ. anthology, a spin-off issue was created, called Jump SQ.II (Second). Saikyō Jump was started on December 3, 2010, with close ties to Weekly Shōnen Jump and V Jump.

== Jump magazines ==
- Green titles in sub-magazines have only been published once.
- See Shōnen manga and Seinen manga for details of classification.

=== Shōnen ===
| Magazine title | Sub-magazines | Date | Time-unit |
|---|---|---|---|
| Weekly Shōnen Jump | Akamaru Jump; Ani Kichi Special; Aomaru Jump; Bessatsu Shōnen Jump; e-Jump; Fresh Jump; Go!Go! Jump; Jump Heroes; Jump Maruchi Wārudo; Jump the Revolution!; Monthly Shōnen Jump; Saikyō Jump; Shōnen Jump Gag Special; Jump Giga; Shōnen Jump Next!; Super Jump; V Jump; Weekly Shōnen Jump 35 Shūnen Kinen Jump Kuronikuru; Weekly Shōnen Jump Sōkan 30 Shūnen Kinen Gengashū; Yomu Jump | October 1969 – present | Weekly |
| V Jump | Saikyō Jump | 1993 – current | Monthly |
| Jump Square | Jump SQ.II (Second); Jump SQ.19; Jump SQ.Crown; Jump SQ.Lab; Jump SQ.Rise | December 2007 – current | Monthly |
| Saikyō Jump | none | December 3, 2010 – current | Monthly |
| Shōnen Jump+ | none | September 22, 2014 – current | Monthly, semimonthly, weekly |
| Shōnen Jump GIGA | none | July 20, 2016 – current | Irregularly |
| Jump TOON | none | May 29, 2024 – current | Weekly |
| Shōnen Jump | Bessatsu Shōnen Jump | July 2, 1968–1969 | Semiweekly |
| Monthly Shōnen Jump | Hobby's Jump; Go!Go! Jump | February 1970 – June 2007 | Monthly |

=== Seinen ===
| Magazine title | Sub-magazines | Date | Time-unit |
|---|---|---|---|
| Weekly Young Jump | Weekly Young Jump Tokubetsu Zōkan Mankaku Rookies; Weekly Young Jump Zōkan Mankaku; Young Jump Chō Zōkan: Ultra Jump Miracle Jump Tonari no Young Jump | May 1979 – current | Weekly |
| Ultra Jump | Ultra Jump Zōkan | October 1999 – current | Monthly |
| Grand Jump | Grand Jump Mucha, Grand Jump Mecha | November 2011 – current | Semimonthly |
| Tonari no Young Jump | none | June 14, 2012 – current | Monthly |
| Miracle Jump | none | May 2008 – March 2017 | Monthly |
| Business Jump | BJ Kon | July 1985 – November 2011 | Monthly |
| Super Jump | Oh Super Jump | December 1986 – November 2011 | Semimonthly |
| Manga Allman | none | October 1995 – February 2002 | Semiweekly |

=== International ===
- Shonen Jump (Viz Media, 2002–2012)
- Weekly Shonen Jump (Viz Media, 2012–2018)
- Banzai! (Carlsen Verlag 2001–2005)
- Formosa Youth

== Imprints ==
When the chapters of a manga series originally serialized in a Jump magazine are collected and published into tankōbon form, they are given different imprints depending on its original magazine or type of tankōbon.

=== Jump Comics ===
Jump Comics (ジャンプコミックス, Janpu Komikkusu), abbreviated JC, is the most common imprint used for tankōbon editions of manga series serialized in Weekly Shōnen Jump and other Jump magazines. The Jump Comics line is published in English by Viz Media under the names Shonen Jump and Shonen Jump Advanced. Shōnen Jump Advanced was created for the distribution of manga series considered more mature due to content or themes. Series released under SJA include Eyeshield 21, Ichigo 100%, Pretty Face, I"s, Hunter × Hunter, Bobobo-bo Bo-bobo and Death Note.

Jump Comics+ is the tankōbon imprint for manga series originally released digitally-only on the Shōnen Jump+ app and website. Jump Comics Deluxe (ジャンプコミックスデラックス, Janpu Komikkusu Derakkusu) is an aizōban imprint formerly run by Weekly Shōnen Jump. The seinen manga anthology Super Jump has taken hold of the line and publishes their manga under it. These manga volumes have expensive paper and new cover artwork. The Jump Comics Deluxe edition of Rurouni Kenshin has been released in English by Viz under the title Rurouni Kenshin VIZBIG Edition.

Jump Comics Digital is an additional imprint added to manga from any Jump magazine when it is published digitally. Jump Comics SQ. is the imprint for manga series originally run in the Jump Square magazine. V Jump Comics (Vジャンプコミックス) was the imprint for manga originally serialized in the V Jump magazine, but they now use the Jump Comics imprint instead. Young Jump Comics (ヤングジャンプ・コミックス) is the imprint for series originally run in the seinen manga magazines Weekly Young Jump, Business Jump and Ultra Jump.

=== Jump J-Books ===
Jump J-Books (ジャンプ ジェイ ブックス, Janpu Jei Bukkusu), commonly referred to as J-Books, is a line of light novels and guidebooks run by Weekly Shōnen Jump. J-Books has run almost ever since the manga Dr. Slump appeared in the 80's, the line is still running and has many series adapted for novels. Jump J-Book have been published in English by Viz Media under the name SJ Fiction.

=== Shueisha Comic Bunko ===
Shueisha Comic Bunko (集英社文庫コミック, Shūeisha Bunko Komikku) is a bunkoban imprint run by Weekly Shōnen Jump. Bunkoban editions have different cover artwork and different cheaper paper.

=== Shueisha Jump Remix ===
Shueisha Jump Remix (集英社ジャンプリミックス, Shūeisha Janpu Rimikkusu), abbreviated as SJR, is a line of large square-bound phone book size issues of early Jump Comics series. They often include special features like original artwork and info. Shueisha Jump Remix is an arm of Shueisha Remix; other types Shueisha REMIX's exist like Shueisha Girl's Remix and Shueisha Home Remix

== Jump related locations and expos ==
=== Jump Festa ===
Jump Festa (ジャンプフェスタ, Janpu Fesuta) is a manga and anime exposition held every year by Shueisha. It focuses on all of the publisher's shōnen-related Jump magazines: Weekly Shōnen Jump, V Jump, Jump SQ., Saikyō Jump, and Shōnen Jump+. Also the video game company, Square Enix promotes their games at Jump Festa, due to their close ties with the V Jump magazine.

== Video games ==
The Jump media franchise includes the following video games, published by Bandai and Bandai Namco Entertainment:

- Famicom Jump: Hero Retsuden (1988)
- Famicom Jump II: Saikyō no Shichinin (1991)
- Battle Stadium D.O.N (2006)
- Jump Super Stars (2005)
- Jump Ultimate Stars (2006)
- J-Stars Victory VS (2014)
- Nintendo Classic Mini: Family Computer Weekly Shōnen Jump 50th Anniversary Version (2018)
- Jump Force (2019)

== See also ==
- Shōnen Jump+ — webcomic platform which hosts a digital version of Weekly Shōnen Jump and original manga; despite its name it also hosts female and adult-oriented manga
- List of series run in Weekly Shōnen Jump
- List of best-selling manga
- List of best-selling comic series
- List of the highest-grossing media franchises
