= List of Beelzebub episodes =

Beelzebub (べるぜバブ, Beruzebabu) is a 2011 Japanese anime television series based on Ryūhei Tamura's manga series of the same name. It was produced by Pierrot+ under the direction of Yoshihiro Takamoto. The series follows high school delinquent Tatsumi Oga, who is forced to raise Beelzebub, the son of the Devil King who was sent to earth to destroy humanity. An original video animation was shown at the Jump Super Anime Tour between October 23 and November 21, 2010. The opening theme for the OVA is "Apparel Boss Appears! Beelzebub" (アッパレ☆番長参上!べるぜバブ, Appare☆Banchō Sanchō! Beruzebabu) by Takeuchi Hiroaki.

The anime series premiered in Japan on Yomiuri TV from January 9, 2011. It uses ten pieces of theme music, five opening and ending songs each. The first opening theme used between episodes 1 and 10 is "DaDaDa" (だだだ) by Group Tamashii, while the second – used from episode 11 to 23 – is "The First Goodbye" (始まるのは, サヨナラ, Hajimaru no wa, Sayonara) by On/Off. The third opening theme, "Hey!!!" by Flow is used from episodes 24 onward. The fourth opening theme "Baby U!" by Kpop boy group MBLAQ is used from episodes 36 to 48. The fifth opening theme, "Only You: Kimi to no Kizuna" by LC5, is used from episodes 49 onwards. The first ending theme used for episodes 1 to 10 is "Answer" by No3b, while the second – used from episode 11 to 23 – is "Show of Courage" (つよがり, Tsuyogari) by Shoko Nakagawa. The third ending theme, "Nanairo Namida" (なないろなみだ; lit. 'Seven-colored Tears') by Tomato n'Pine is used from episodes 24 to 35. The fourth ending, "Papepipu Papipepu papepipupo" by Nozomi Sasaki, is used from episodes 36 to 48. The fifth ending, "Shōjo Traveler" (少女トラベラー, Shōjo Toraberā; Girl Traveler) by 9nine, is used from episodes 49 onwards.

== OVA ==
No.	Title	Original release date
OVA	"This Baby is a Demon King!?"; Transliteration: "Hirotta Aka-chan wa Daimaō!?" (Japanese: 拾った赤ちゃんは大魔王!?)	October 23, 2010
Tatsumi Oga arrives at Ishiyama High School with an electricity-emitting baby, whose origins he has trouble explaining to his friend, Takayuki Furuichi. They are approached by a woman named Hildegarde, who explains that the baby, Kaiser de Emperana Beelzebub IV, is the son of a demon lord and Oga has been chosen to raise it to destroy humanity. After initially being chased after by Hildegarde after refusing to take care of Beelzebub, Oga learns that if he can find someone more ruthless than he is, he can get rid of him. Oga seeks out one of Ishiyama's toughest delinquents, Hajime Kanzaki, easily beating his henchman, Shiroyama. When Kanzaki asks Oga to throw Shiroyama out of the window, Oga determines from Beelzebub's reaction that Kanzaki is not suited and knocks him out the window instead. That evening, Hildegarde arranges to stay at Oga's house, mentioning Beelzebub cannot go further than 15 meters away from him. The next day, another one of Ishiyama's feared leaders, Aoi Kunieda, arrives with her gang to face against Oga, though she recognizes him as someone who helped her at the park while she was in disguise taking care of her brother. After dodging her powerful attacks, Oga asks Aoi to be Beelzebub's mother, which just makes her embarrassed. Later, another leader, Tatsuya Himekawa, arranges for Furuichi, Hildegarde and Beelzebub to be kidnapped. Oga manages to catch up with the help of the transdimensional demon, Alaindelon, before utilizing Beelzebub's power to beat Himekawa. The OVA ends with Oga confronting the final leader, Hidetora Tōjō.

== Episode list ==
No.	Title	Original air date
1	"I Picked Up the Demon King"; Transliteration: "Maō Hiroimashita" (Japanese: 魔王拾いました)	January 9, 2011
Tatsumi Oga, a delinquent student, arrives at school with a small baby who emits massive shocks of electricity whenever he cries. Oga claims to find him after a strange man who came floating along the river split in two, which his friend Takayuki Furuichi, does not believe. While at Furuichi's house, they are approached by a demon maid named Hildegarde. She claims the baby, known as Kaiser de Emperana Beelzebub IV, is the son of Devil King who was sent to Earth to find the most evil human to raise him so he could destroy humanity. When Hildegarde attempts to retrieve Beelzebub and fails, she admits that Oga has been chosen for the job, but Oga refuses. Hildegarde attempts to kill him with a bird demon, which Oga eventually beat. He steps in to save the baby from damaged pylon that almost falls on Beelzebub. After Oga recovers from the ordeal, Hildegarde decides to stay with him to raise Beelzebub together much to Oga's chagrin.
2	"I Became a Gang Leader with a Child"; Transliteration: "Kodure Banchō Hajimemashita" (Japanese: 子連れ番長 はじめました)	January 16, 2011
Hildegarde presents herself to Oga's family in the wrong way, leading Oga's parents and sister to believe Baby Beel is her and Oga's illegitimate son. She also informs Oga that if he is more than 15 meters away from Baby Beel, who he nicknames, his cries will increase in power until they destroy the city. While dealing with this situation, Oga comes up with the idea that if he can find someone stronger and more ruthless than he is he can dump Baby Beel on them and be free.
3	"Aren't There Any Strong, Ruthless Bastards Around?"; Transliteration: "Tsuyokute Kyōbōna Yarō imasen ka?" (Japanese: 強くて凶暴なヤローいませんか?)	January 23, 2011
When Oga loses food meant for Baby Beel and starts to get hungry, he instead uses up a vending machine's worth of yogurt drink. Knowing he may be worthy of dumping Baby Beel on, Oga goes to see him under the pretense of becoming his henchman. After beating his current henchman, Oga is asked by Kanzaki to throw him out of the window, but instead decides he is not worthy based on Baby Beel's expression and knocks him out instead.
4	"There Is One Second Before the Demon Lord's Floods Burst Forth"; Transliteration: "Maō no Omarashi, Kekkai 1-byōmae desu ga" (Japanese: 魔王のおもらし 決壊1秒前ですが)	January 30, 2011
Hildegarde temporarily stops the endless urination that threatens to flood the city with an interdimensional diaper. However, wanting to stop it completely, Oga decides he needs to buy a super absorbent diaper advertised on TV. Upon reaching the supermarket only to find the brand had already sold out, one of Kanzaki's henchmen – Shintarou Natsume – tells Oga about the TKKH, the strongest delinquents in Ishiyama High. Even worse, the supermarket is taken hostage by a group of thugs. As Oga tells everyone to see how ruthless they are, Baby Beel's diaper gets stuck on the leader's gun. Although the leader considers raising Baby Beel, Oga ends up changing his mind and beats him up, before they decide to hover Baby Beel over the ocean until he finishes urinating.
5	"Money Can Buy Anything"; Transliteration: "Okane de Kaenai Mono wa arimasen" (Japanese: お金でかえないものはありません)	February 6, 2011
After a sleep-deprived night, Oga notices he has a strange mark on his hand, revealed to be Zebel Spell, a symbol of the contract between him and Baby Beel. Hildegarde and Alaindelon explain that a Demon Lord's parent is a vessel for his power, and the mark will grow the more opponents Oga defeats. Wanting to get rid of the mark, Oga decides to give up fighting to reduce its size. Meanwhile, another member of the TKKH, Tatsuya Himekawa, hires some thugs to kidnap Hildegarde and Furuichi in order to get Oga's attention. Oga uses Alaindelon to sneak in and forgoes his promise to beat Himekawa's henchmen. Himekawa tries to use a stun rod, but Oga resists it and uses Baby Beel's power to beat him, which also makes his mark grow larger.
6	"Toys Have Arrived from the Demon World/We Played Doctor"; Transliteration: "Makai no Omocha Todokimashita/Oisha-san-gokko Shimashita" (Japanese: 魔界のおもちゃ届きました/お医者さんごっこしました)	February 13, 2011
The mark on Oga's arm goes back to its smaller size, much to the chagrin of Hildegarde who destroys his games console. She brings a play room for Baby Beel to play in, but upon building it, it turns out to be a magical cage that both she and Oga get stuck inside. The only way to get out is to have Baby Beel solve a puzzle toy, but he just ends up breaking it. A frustrated Oga utilizes his Zebel power to punch his way out, but it makes his mark grow again. After some failed attempts at treating some of the students, they change back after discovering an actually useful tool on Baby Beel's costume, but accidentally triggers an explosive that negates all the works Oga did getting his mark down to size.
7	"The Demon Lord Makes His Park Debut"; Transliteration: "Maō mo Kōen Debyū shimasu" (Japanese: 魔王も公園デビューします)	February 20, 2011
Oga's family coerces him into taking Baby Beel to the park so he can make his "park debut". Despite making a bad impression with the other mothers, Oga meets a girl named Aoi who is looking after her little brother, Kota. The general antics convince the other mothers to call over a police officer, who starts trash-talking both Oga and Aoi. Before Aoi can lose her temper, Oga throws him into a trash can, with Aoi coming off impressed. After Oga leaves, Aoi's true identity is revealed to be Aoi Kunieda, leader of the Red Tails gang.
8	"We Meet Again"; Transliteration: "Mata Deaimashita" (Japanese: また 出会いました)	February 27, 2011
Aoi and the Red Tails return to Ishiyama High to deal with Oga, despite not knowing who he is. When Furuichi drags Oga to meet her, Aoi is shocked to find Oga is the one she met at the park, although he does not recognize her back. Aoi starts to fight him using powerful bokuto attacks that cut through glass, but he manages to dodge all of her attacks. Impressed by her strength, Oga asks Aoi to become Baby Beel's mother which causes her to become embarrassed and run off. Afterward, Aoi seems to develop feelings towards Oga. Meanwhile, another delinquent gang plots to take down Aoi.
9	"Love is a Hurricane"; Transliteration: "Koi wa Harikēn desu" (Japanese: 恋はハリケーンです)	March 6, 2011
A delinquent group called MK-5 come to confront Oga, but is beaten by him and Hildegarde, who catches the attention of a smitten Aoi. As Aoi's right-hand ladies – Chiaki Tanimura and Nene Oomura – confront Oga, Hildegarde, who had heard from Oga about his plans to dump Baby Beel onto Aoi, challenges her to a fight to test her strength. When Aoi returns to find Chiaki and Nene injured, she assumes Oga is responsible and confronts him in a fight. However, Chiaki and Nene were attacked by MK-5. Afterwards, Aoi is once again baffled by Oga trying to give her Baby Beel, explaining that he's forced to raise him due to Hildegarde's actions.
10	"A Disciple was Gained"; Transliteration: "Deshi ga Dekimashita" (Japanese: 弟子ができました)	March 27, 2011
A stray cat becomes attached to Oga, causing Baby Beel to become extremely jealous and shock anyone he shows affection towards. Baby Beel challenges the cat to a fight and subsequently loses, but when a gang of fierce cats gang up on the cat for fighting in their territory, Baby Beel stands up for him, prompting Oga to help out. Afterward, Baby Beel and the cat become friends. Later, Oga takes Baby Beel and the cat to a play center where he once again meets Aoi in her park debut outfit. While Baby Beel and Kota get into heated competition with some other toddlers, Oga and Aoi have a conversation full of misunderstandings, both ending with explosive results. Afterward, the cat decides to leave in order to protect his fellow strays.
11	"There was Something Money Could Not Buy"; Transliteration: "Kane de Kaenai Mono, Arimashita" (Japanese: 金で買えないもの、ありました)	April 3, 2011
Himekawa plots revenge against Oga by setting him up with a poisoned sandwich, but it does not affect him due to his experience resisting Hilda's terrible cooking. He next attempts to use a popular costumed character to try to capture Baby Beel, but Oga and Baby Beel notice that he is a fake due to differently-colored chopsticks. He later has one of his subordinates masquerade as a woman to seduce Furuichi into giving him Baby Beel, but Alaindelon intervenes, transporting Himekawa and his gang to a far-off island. The resulting failures leave Himekawa without money to hire any more henchmen. And as he tries to attack Oga by himself, he gets caught up in fighting against a rival gang also attempting to kill Oga. Afterwards, Kanzaki offers him one of his yogurt drinks, to which Himekawa repays him with a year's supply with a month-long lifespan.
12	"I Won't Let You Sleep Tonight"; Transliteration: "Kon'ya wa Nekasemasen" (Japanese: 今夜は寝かせません)	April 10, 2011
Baby Beel has been crying all night for the past three nights, which is causing Oga and the whole neighbourhood to get very little sleep. Wanting to stop his night crying to avoid being chased out of their house, the Oga family attempts to play with Baby Beel all day in order to tire him out come nighttime. Despite managing to get him to sleep, Baby Beel still wakes up and cries in the middle of the night. After Oga spends the day dealing with a sleep-deprived TKKH, Hilda brings a toy that calms Baby Beel down, but the toy is even noisier than his crying.
13	"Baby Beel's Assessment Test/Hilda: Dear Great Demon Lord"; Transliteration: "Beru-bō Jitsuryoku Tesuto desu/Hiruda Haikei Daimaō-sama" (Japanese: ベル坊 実力テストです/ヒルダ 拝啓大魔王様)	April 17, 2011
As Ishiyama High holds an assessment test for its study phobic students, the Great Demon Lord also holds a test for Baby Beel, requiring him to earn points by beating up various animals and insects or run the risk of both he and Oga facing remedial classes in the Demon World. With Baby Beel not showing much hope, Oga decides to try to dump Baby Beel on whoever scores the highest on the test. When a rival school interrupts the test, Oga fights them off to allow the other students to take the test, earning enough points to avoid remedial lessons, later learning that the smartest student is actually Furuichi. Later, Hilda prepares a letter to the Great Demon Lord, writing reports on Oga, his family and the TKKH.
14	"Is There a Special Move?"; Transliteration: "Hissatsu Waza, Arimasuka?" (Japanese: 必殺技、ありますか?)	April 24, 2011
As Kanzaki tries to come up with a new special move to beat Oga, his followers suggest the key to Oga's power is having Baby Beel on his back. Therefore, Kanzaki starts training with a weighted baby doll on his back. When that plan does not work, they try finding a living substitute, which ends in embarrassment. Meanwhile, Oga takes Baby Beel to the park where they once again meet Aoi, who has lost track of Kouta. Kanzaki coincidentally finds him and deems him a worthy substitute for Baby Beel. While playing with him, he figures out the key to performing his new special move. After returning Kouta to Aoi, Kanzaki performs his special move, though it just leaves everyone confused. After Kanzaki leaves, Oga admits his move was surprising.
15	"The Delinquents have Changed into Swimsuits"; Transliteration: "Furyō ga Mizugi ni Kigaemashita" (Japanese: 不良が水着に着替えました)	May 1, 2011
Furuichi tells Oga about the final member of the TKKH, Hidetora Tojo, mainly to get him interested in ditching Baby Beel so Alaidelon will leave him alone. Wanting Oga to get beaten, Himekawa informs them that Tojo works at the beach. Oga and Furuichi go there the next day and get mistaken as part-timers for a yakisoba stand, later finding that Tōjō had actually been fired the previous night. As he keeps missing him, Oga asks Aoi to pass on a letter of challenge to Tōjō, whose henchmen find it before Aoi can rip it up. Oga gets held up to their meeting, arriving only to find a pile of beat-up gang members, which Tojo beat all by himself. Despite Aoi's warnings, Oga looks forward to finally meeting Tojo.
16	"You're Not a Bad Specimen of a Man"; Transliteration: "Nakanaka Otoko ja nai desu ka" (Japanese: なかなか男じゃないですか)	May 8, 2011
Furuichi is dragged away from his tropical summer vacation against his will to join Oga and Baby Beel at a public pool. While chatting with the Red Tails, Furuichi is approached by some delinquents from his old middle school and ends up going against their leader, Takashima, when they start hitting on the girls. Furuichi tries to hide in the pool, but Takashima calls more of his men and tricks the lifeguard into evacuating the pool, leaving Furuichi and a stunned Oga. As Furuichi becomes surrounded, he forces Baby Beel to cry in order to shock all the delinquents before facing Oga's wrath.
17	"How About Some Demon World Homework?"; Transliteration: "Makai no Shukudai Dō-deshō?" (Japanese: 魔界の宿題どうでしょう?)	May 15, 2011
The Demon King sends Baby Beel some summer homework, containing a notebook which brings anything drawn in it to life. Later, Hilda brings Oga to Ishiyama High to collect prints of rare powerful beasts by whacking them with a giant fly swatter. During the chase, Baby Beel ends up planting several carnivorous Demon Plants, one of which grows into a massive giant causing havoc until Oga destroys it.
18	"I Quit being the Baby on Back Brawler"; Transliteration: "Kozure Banchō, Yamemashita" (Japanese: 子連れ番長、やめました)	May 22, 2011
Beel gets a summer cold, causing his body to give off incredible heat. As his condition gets worse, the Zebel Spell on Oga's hand disappears, leading Hilda to become frustrated with Oga for showing little care towards him. As Oga tries to decide what to do, he encounters one of Tojo's henchmen, Shojo Aizawa, who seems to outmatch Oga before leaving. The next morning, both Hilda and Beel have disappeared. As Oga searches for them, he encounters Tojo with Beel on his back, who challenges Oga to a fight. When the two fight, Oga is shocked to see what appears to be the Zebel Spell on Tojo's shoulder before he is knocked clean into the river.
19	"The Doctor has Arrived"; Transliteration: "Isha ga Kimashita" (Japanese: 医者が来ました)	May 29, 2011
Oga returns home after being defeated by Tojo to find that Hilda has returned from the Demon World with the imperial doctor, Forcas Rachmaninoff, and his assistant, Lamia, to help determine the cause of Beel's illness. He diagnoses the illness as King Fever, resulting in massive amounts of demon power being transferred from Beel to Oga. However, Baby Beel is afraid that Oga would be unable to handle the overwhelming power and might die if it was too much for him. Oga begins a treatment to reconnect with Beel and enters a dream world through the effects of a Demon World drug that is shot into his head. He eventually finds a sleeping Beel in the middle of several inscribed circles. After about six hours of treatment, Oga still has not woken up and Lamia assumes that he has died and becomes happy. Oga suddenly wakes up and spanks Lamia and claims he is teaching her some manners. Hilda asks Oga how he feels after having gone through the hard part of reconnecting with Beel and Oga says he is in the mood to get Beel back.
20	"Everyone Assemble"; Transliteration: "Zen'in Shūgōdesu" (Japanese: 全員集合です)	June 5, 2011
Oga reflects on Lamia telling him to take a shower before going to Tojo and sees a silhouette outside his bathroom window and thinks it is Lamia, but it is really Shiroyama, who takes Oga to Kanzaki and Himekawa who tell him they want to team up to beat Tojo. On the way to Ishiyama High, they are surrounded by a large group of delinquents, which Oga takes care of. Upon arrival, the rest of the school is there to confront Oga, but Kunieda and the Red Tails takes care of them for him. Tojo sets off fireworks to try to cheer up Beel and all the delinquents are captivated by them. Oga confronts Tojo, who is willing to return Beel only to have Oga tell him that whoever Beel wants to stay with is up to him. Just as the episode ends, Oga and Tojo are about to begin their fight.
21	"Who Do You Think Is Ishiyama's Strongest?"; Transliteration: "Ishiyama Saikyō, Docchi deshō?" (Japanese: 石矢魔(いしやま)最強、どっちでしょう?)	June 12, 2011
Furuichi is woken up by Alaindelon at 4am and teleported to Ishiyama High to watch Oga and Tojo's fight with Hilda, Lamia, and Forcas Rachmaninoff. Meanwhile, Kanzaki, Himekawa, and Shiroyama confront Aizawa and Karou and begin to fight, but are quickly beaten by them, but they refuse to give up due to their stubbornness. Tojo's past is revealed, showing a man he looked up to who taught Tojo the true meaning of fighting and had a Zebul Spell on his shoulder, which Tojo got tattooed on his shoulder to look like him. He tells Oga he is now the strongest at Ishiyama High. However, Baby Beel got too excited, which was giving problems to his arm, he releases all of that energy which destroys the school.
22	"Secluded Mountain Training"; Transliteration: "Yamagomori desu" (Japanese: 山ごもりです)	June 19, 2011
Baby Beel's fear of insects prompts Oga to give him some special training up in the mountainous village of Mapputatsu. He stumbles across Kunieda carrying Kota in the disguise she wore at the park with her grandfather. While Oga is still unaware of her true identity as Kunieda, her grandfather develops an interest in him.
23	"You Kidding Me? The Demon World."; Transliteration: "Honmakai" (Japanese: ほんまかい)	June 26, 2011
As the Zebub Spell is restored, Lamia and Dr. Forcas begins to return to the Demon World through Alaindelon. While they were being transported, Baby Beel grabbed onto Lamia and refused to let go, causing Furuichi and Oga to be transported as well. The four of them landed in Vlad's Haunt, one of the most dangerous areas in the Demon World, with Alaindelon unconscious from transporting too many people at once. A Yople alien shows up, which Oga punches, causing the Yople to call the creatures in Vlad's Haunt to attack the group. When the group escapes to find Alaindelon's daughter, they encounter numerous creatures, with Furuichi suffering the worst of their attacks. Finally reaching their destination, they realize the place was ransacked by bandits, Gare and Edda, who have kidnapped Alaindelon's daughter. After Oga defeats the bandits easily, the episode ends with Furuichi realising how attractive the daughter is.
24	"Welcome Back, Demon World"; Transliteration: "Tadaimakai" (Japanese: ただいまかい)	July 3, 2011
While finding Alaindelon's daughter rather attractive, Furuichi vows to rescue her while Gare and Edda led him to Oga and Lamia in the village of thieves where Alaindelon's daughter, Angelica is trapped. The rescue runs smoothly until a large Demon named Vlad's Master is awakened and terrorizes the village in which Beelzebub suddenly grows huge to fight it off.
25	"New Semester Started"; Transliteration: "Shin-gakki Hajimarimashita" (Japanese: 新学期はじまりました)	July 10, 2011
The students of Ishiyama High settle in at St. Ishiyama, with all the significant characters being placed in the same classroom. Their new homeroom teacher, Sadohara, challenges Tojo to an arm wrestle to try to establish some authority over the class, failing miserably when Tojo accidentally slams him upside-down against the wall. He picks a second target, Oga, who was sleeping in his seat, and wakes Oga in order to challenge him. Baby Beel is angry to have been woken and subsequently tantrums, shocking Oga and Sudohara. An aspiring delinquent from St. Ishiyama, Kazuya, goes searching for Oga after hearing rumors of his strength, bringing his childhood friend Azusa with him. After leaving the alleyway, Kazuya begs Oga to take him under his wing.
26	"May I Call You Brother"; Transliteration: "Aniki to Yonde mo Iidesu ka" (Japanese: アニキと呼んでもいいですか)	July 17, 2011
Oga and Furuichi accept Kazuya as their student, after being praised on how legendary they are. Kazuya tries to copy Oga to become strong like him, even making identical lunch boxes. Due to the Teimo incident, Oga and Kunieda meet Kido, the teacher in charge of student life at Saint Ishiyama Academy. Oga and Kunieda receive a warning of expulsion if they persist to cause trouble for the school. Meanwhile, Kunieda tries to learn from Azusa to be more open to men, but realises it to be impossible. In order to get Kazuya off his back, Oga pretends to teach the secret technique of electric shocks, and manages to convince Kazuya successfully. Kazuya hears news of Azusa being kidnapped by a bald man suspected to be a Teimo member, and tries to rescue her with his new "powers". After Kazuya fails to land any hits, Kunieda arrives and reveals the man to be an acquaintance of her temple, and the situation is resolved.
27	"Called the Magical Girl"; Transliteration: "Mahō Shōjo to Yobarete" (Japanese: 魔法少女と呼ばれて)	July 24, 2011
Wanting to apologize for forgetting his daughter's birthday, Alaindelon brought Angelica to Furuichi's house for a tour of the Human World. Unfortunately, although the gifts were being retrieved from Alaindelon, a Yople alien teleported into the human world and escaped. Angelica resolves to track down the Yople, using a demon wand that transforms its user into a Magical Girl. Gathering four girls – Hilda, Azusa, Honoka and Aoi – they form the 5 Fairies of Light and manages to track down the Yople at an amusement park, where Tojo was working as part of the cast in a Gohan-kun theatre drama. A rival girl gang challenges Aoi while they were capturing the Yople and a fight ensures. Furuichi eventually pins down the Yople and both of them are teleported away with Angelica's ability, but Angelica left before Furuichi could ask her about it.
28	"Let's All Get Physicals"; Transliteration: "Shintai Sokutei Shitemimashō" (Japanese: 身体測定してみましょう)	July 31, 2011
The students of Ishiyama High are ordered to do physical examinations amongst themselves. Baby Beel gets jealous of a toy which accidentally gets stuck to Oga's back, and locks himself inside of a locker to pout in protest. While trying to lure him out, the girls come into the room for their physicals, forcing Oga and Furuichi to hide under the desk while the girls strip off and start measuring. Aoi returns to the classroom moments after leaving and finds the two of them inside. During the conflict, Baby Beel exits the classroom through an open window and climbs into Sadohara's sports car, and locks the door behind him, which Oga is unable to pull open. Baby Beel "springs a leak", filling the car. Unable to think of any other option, Oga chops the car resulting in the entire shell of it shattering.
29	"What Are the Six Holy Knights?"; Transliteration: "Rokkisei-tte Nan desu ka?" (Japanese: 六騎聖って何ですか？)	August 7, 2011
After being shocked early in the morning by Baby Beel, Oga's enthusiasm to find someone new to pass Beel onto is temporarily reborn, and upon hearing rumors of six students who excel both in academics and sports, he goes off searching for these six in the hopes that they will impress Baby Beel. Accompanied by Aoi, Oga goes searching for Kazuya to get more information about the 6 Holy Knights. He finds Azusa while looking for Kazuya and is quickly interrupted when two of the Knights show up. Aoi cuts the tip of Sakaki's sword off during his attack, proving herself to be the more skilled swordsman. Oga refuses to fight his opponent, Alex, and instead quizzes him while attempting to dodge his attacks. Alex gives up when he realizes Oga is not taking the fight seriously and the two knights leave the scene.
30	"Who Could the Six Holy Knights Be?"; Transliteration: "Rokkisei wa Daredeshou?" (Japanese: 六騎聖は誰でしょう?)	August 14, 2011
Two students from St. Ishiyama are seen hassling two of Aoi's gang, causing Shiroyama to interject, telling them to leave. The two disgruntled students are offered a free punch by Shiroyama as compensation for breaking off their advance on the girls. They roll a large weight onto Shiroyama, causing him to be hospitalized. The members of the 6 Holy Knights are all waiting on the roof when the Ishiyama High students arrive. As Natsume, Go, Oga, and Alex are in fights, Miki steps in to challenge him, claiming to know Oga from a long time ago and have surpassed him. Oga claims to not recognize him, but takes him seriously, passing Baby Beel onto Aoi in order to fight properly.
31	"No End Was Reached"; Transliteration: "Ketchaku, Tsukimasendeshita" (Japanese: 決着、つきませんでした)	August 28, 2011
The fight between Oga and Miki begins, with Miki seemingly beating Oga with ease. He strikes Oga with a technique which Aoi recognizes to be Hakkyokuken. Before he has a chance to use it, he is interrupted by Nanami, the second strongest of the 6 Holy Knights. Aoi senses how much power he has and recognizes that they have no hope of defeating him. The students of Ishiyama High enter the Counselor's office to complain and are told that they have a chance to avoid expulsion by beating the 6 Holy Knights during a sporting event at the upcoming school festival. The students accept in a reluctant manner and leave the office.
32	"What has the Transfer Girl Done?"; Transliteration: "Tenkō Shōjo ni Nani ga Okorimashita ka?" (Japanese: 転校少女に ナニが起こりましたか?)	September 4, 2011
Hilda transfers into the class to keep an eye on how things are progressing, with Alaindelon transferring into another class. The students find out the sport will be volleyball, something none of them have any experience in. The students lack motivation which Hilda promises to sort out. With the help of Alaindelon they kidnap the delinquents and force them to watch a poorly edited video of the 6 Holy Knights bad-mouthing them. All of the delinquents except Furuichi believe in the video and become fired up, ready to beat their opponents.
33	"There Are Wounds in the Past"; Transliteration: "Kako ni Kizu Arimashita" (Japanese: 過去に傷ありました)	September 11, 2011
Oga gets tired of practicing and walks out of the gym, itching for a fight. He finds Miki training in a nearby Dojo, and challenges him to a fight. Oga takes all of Miki's attacks head on, and is clearly damaged from the strength of the attacks. Later, Oga claims that it is all a matter of fighting spirit and he is ready to win at volleyball and any fights he gets into.
34	"Maids Run Amok"; Transliteration: "Meido Osawagaseshimasu" (Japanese: ﾒｲﾄﾞお騒がせします)	September 18, 2011
With the festival is underway, Azusa is trying to run a Maid Café. Furuichi offers to help, but Azusa and her friends obey his commands due to his reputation as "The Strategist". Furuichi persuades many of the Red Tails to dress up in Maid uniforms, claiming that this is a preliminary battle against a café that the 6 Holy Knights are running elsewhere. Hilda also gets involved, and remodels the café to be more formal. Some rowdy guests from Teimo High enter the cafe acting unruly, whom Hilda is quick to discipline.
35	"Time for the Game to Begin"; Transliteration: "Shiai Kaishi no Jikan desu" (Japanese: 試合開始の時間です)	September 25, 2011
The volleyball match begins, with both teams proving to be competent at the sport. The Ishiyama High gang commit fouls and play dirty, gaining them enough points to make the first set a close one. Izuma starts serving using a fighting technique to power the balls towards Kunieda with such power that she cannot dig them out. Kunieda's arms are burned badly from trying to deflect the balls, and she substitutes for Furuichi, who proves to be totally useless. A determined Kunieda returns to the court and manages to start digging out Izuma's serves. Both teams are at match point when Izuma hits a ball that heads right to the edge of the court, beyond Kunieda's reach. Oga jumps ahead and eventually returns the ball, with enough speed and power that the 6 Holy Knights cannot return it, ending in a victory for Ishiyama High.
36	"The End has Finally Arrived"; Transliteration: "Ketchaku, Yatto Tsukimashita" (Japanese: 決着、やっとつきました)	October 2, 2011
Kiriya, the man who scarred Miki and tried to attack Oga in the past, shows up at the volleyball match. He declares that he is seeking revenge on Oga and has taken hostages at the school to stop anyone interfering. Oga and Miki team up to take down Kiriya's henchmen while the 6 Holy Knights, the Red tails and the TKKH incapacitate all of the Keimo High students holding the St. Ishiyama students captive. As Izuma walks out of the gym, he warns Oga not to show off his demon powers in public. On the roof, Oga tells Hilda and Alaindelon what Izuma had said to him. At the end of the episode, Aoi is seen heading towards the roof.
37	"This Man was a Teacher"; Transliteration: "Sono Otoko, Sensei deshita" (Japanese: その男、先生でした)	October 9, 2011
Baby Beel is having a great time at a railroad crossing and wishes Oga to sing with him, but Oga thinking about the Izuma's words about demon powers. Aoi, who happens to be behind them, runs into Nene and Yuka. They once again assume Aoi is going to confess to Oga. At school, Oga has become a celebrity for the "magic trick" after the volleyball match. Furuichi drags Oga into creating another illusion. Later, Tōjō talks to Shizuka stating his fight with Izuma is ongoing. The two meet on the roof, where Oga joins in. However, before they can begin, the new homeroom teacher, Zenjuro Saotome lands from flying beats them up and brings the unconscious Oga and Tōjō to class. Hilda appears on the roof to fight with Saotome because she believes him to be an agent of Behemoth. She warns him not to harm Beel. Meanwhile, Aoi can catch a glimpse of Hilda's demon powers in action.
38	"The Sibling Rivalry Has Begun"; Transliteration: "Kyoudai-genka Hajimemashita" (Japanese: 兄弟ゲンカ、始めました)	October 16, 2011
Oga attempts to explain the whole situation to Aoi, but he and Furuichi get stuck on remembering Baby Beel's name. Not long after, a demon maidservant who looks similar to Hilda named Yolda appears, and expresses her unhappiness with the situation. Later, two demon maid servants appear along with a young boy who is introduced by the maids as Lord En, Baby Beel's older brother who has come due to BabyBeel taking too long to destroy humanity. Baby Beel is constantly ignoring the attention-seeking Lord En, making him upset.
39	"His Brother was a Crybaby"; Transliteration: "Ani wa Nakimushi deshita" (Japanese: 兄は泣き虫でした)	October 23, 2011
Before destroying humanity, Lord En wants to experience everything in the human world. As Lord En is a huge fan of games and the like, he is drawn to the game centers and amusement parks there, then distracted from his original mission of destroying humanity. At Ishiyama Land, he cries simply over the smallest things that BabyBeel does or happens generally. He suggests going on a roller-coaster, which everyone is against due to his crying sounds, but still demands to go on. Lord En ends up crying and creating fire once again on the roller-coaster, then alerts Oga that he may be attacked by his private guards.
40	"No Shirt, No Shoes, No Assassins"; Transliteration: "Shikyaku wa Kyaku de wa arimasen" (Japanese: 刺客は客ではありません)	October 30, 2011
Izumo and Tojo have a fight after school and Izumo reveals some of his demon powers. However Behemoth's 34 Pillar Division has arrived and causes trouble. Aoi is captured by one of the pillars named Hecatos who wants to make her his contractor so that he can use all his powers in the human world. Oga and Hilda then fight together against him in order to rescue Aoi, however just before they believed they'd won Hilda is stabbed by Hecatos.
41	"On the Brink! What Will We Do?"; Transliteration: "Zettai zetsumei! Dō-shimashō?" (Japanese: 絶体絶命どうしましょう)	November 6, 2011
While everything is in commotion, Lord En continues his tour of the human world and is now in Akihabara. As usual, he also cries due to the maids being mistaken for cosplayers and feels left out. Kanzaki and Yuka are both spying on Tojo and Izuma's fight, until two of the pillars: Graphel and Naga interrupt the fight and beat Izuma up. Izuma is revealed to be only half demon and has not actually made contact with any real demons before and so his power is weaker than that of a real one. Tojo cuts in, so does Kanzaki, but Graphel does not get a chance to fight Kanzaki. Although Tojo fights Graphel, they soon leave to join Hecadoth. Oga attempts to beat Hecadoth using his Zebel Blast but is blocked easily. Saotome enters and uses his spell master magic forcing Graffel, Naga and Hecatos to retreat. They quickly call Lamia and Dr. Forcas to check on Hilda before it is too late.
42	"It's Time to Train"; Transliteration: "Shugyō no Jikan desu yo" (Japanese: 修業の時間ですよ)	November 13, 2011
Hilda recovers and apologizes for everything and being unable to help. Oga decides to become stronger to protect everyone and so seeks for Aoi's grandfather to train him. Seeing Kouta out of the shrine, Oga comes to the incorrect conclusion that Aoi Kunie is actually Aoi Kunieda's cousin when in fact they are the same people. Oga and Teima Shadow receive pointless training from Aoi's grandfather. Saotome and Tojo talk about the incident, but the latter does not understand everything about demons and mistakes them for bears and Saotome's friends.
43	"Where Did the Older Brother Disappear To?"; Transliteration: "Ani wa Doko e Kieta no deshō?" (Japanese: 兄はどこへ消えたのでしょう？)	November 20, 2011
Lamia ask Furuichi to find BabyBeel's brother. However, when they visit the game center, they find Kanzaki, Himekawa and Yuko. Furuichi ask them for help. Meanwhile, Aoi and Oga went for training to be strong.
44	"I Have to Get Stronger"; Transliteration: "Tsuyokunaranakya Ikemasen" (Japanese: 強くならなきゃいけません)	November 27, 2011
Oga, Aoi, and the others arrive at the training area. The first task is collect a stone, where they will try to split the stone in two and receive no food until it is done. When it gets late, Aoi drags Oga from his giant stone by force when he refuses to leave it, and everyone goes to the nearby temple to sleep. In the morning, Aoi checks on everyone and grows worried when Oga's bed is empty. hurries to the training area, only to find Oga lying on the ground next to his giant stone, which is split in two. Shortly afterwards, Oga is seen walking upstairs and complaining about a special course he has to do. He reaches the top and is shocked to see his homeroom teacher waiting for him. His teacher greets him and welcomes Oga to the second part of his training.
45	"There's One Day and 1 Hour Left Until the Game"; Transliteration: "Gēmu wa Ichinichi 1-jikan made desu" (Japanese: ゲームは一日1時間までです)	December 4, 2011
46	"Burn, Super Combination!"; Transliteration: "Moero, Chōzetsu Gattai!" (Japanese: 燃えろ、超絶合体!)	December 11, 2011
47	"Sorry to Have Kept You Waiting"; Transliteration: "Omataseshimashita" (Japanese: お待たせしました)	December 18, 2011
48	"I'm His Parent"; Transliteration: "Ore ga Oya desu" (Japanese: オレが親です)	December 25, 2011
Returning from his training, Oga was renewed with a different notion that he wanted to protect everyone along with finally accepting the responsibility of raising Baby Beel himself. When one of the Pillars countered that he would destroy humanity, Oga contests that they are wrong, claiming that it is because he is the parent of Baby Beel. Upon fighting, he introduces his new technique called the "Zebul Emblem" and "Super Milk Time". Wanting to remove the divider between Oga and Baby Beel, he drank the milk to suddenly become powerful. Eventually, the demon power from Baby Beel increased as he drank more, and Oga defeated the two Pillar heads. Finally drinking the entire milk, he fights the Pillar Head Naga while merged with Baby Beel. As a result, Oga became Baby Beel himself with wings, and scattered the Zebul Emblem to surround the Pillar Heads. At the end, he defeated the three Pillar Heads and with the top of Himekawa's hotel destroyed due to the explosion.
49	"Beelzebub's New Year's Special! Beelbeel Journey to the West!"; Transliteration: "Beelzebub Oshougatsu Supesharu! BeelBeel Seiyuuki" (Japanese: べるぜバブお正月スペシャル! ベルベル西遊記)	January 8, 2012
50	"Today, I'm Different On The Inside"; Transliteration: "Kyō Watashi wa Uchigawa ni Koto naru yo" (Japanese: 今日私は内側に異なるよ)	January 15, 2012
Due to the after effects of Super Milk Time, Baby Beel and Oga have switched bodies. Wanting to return things back to normal, they ask Saotome-Sensei to see if he knows how to, but are repeatedly disrupted by everyone else from the academy trying to start a fight with Oga. Eventually, Baby Beel runs away after being drawn to a smell. Hilda, Furuichi, and Oga try to catch Baby Beel, where they find him attached to Aoi. After hugging Aoi, Baby Beel runs off once again, so Hilda and Aoi have a match to see who can catch him. Shortly afterwards, Aoi and Hilda attack Oga (Baby Beel) when fighting over him. Just before they hit him, Oga and BabyBeel return to normal, leaving Oga being severely hurt by the two and BabyBeel perfectly fine.
51	"Komainu-sama is Watching You"; Transliteration: "Komainu-sama wa Anata o Miteimasu" (Japanese: 狛犬はあなたを見ています)	January 22, 2012
Oga is trying to think of a way to perfect Super Milk Time before they are attacked again whilst Nene and the rest of the Red Tails are trying to get Aoi back into the group by persuading her to attend a fake meeting at Aoi's place. Aoi's demon magic is revealed to be Koma, a perverted demon whom she acquired at Mapputatsu Temple. Oga has found a new milk bottle that will hopefully help Super Milk Time and is asking Furuichi to try it, who is obviously reluctant as he is "busy". Meanwhile, St Marian's High School for Girls have declared a battle against the Red Tails to overtake the Southern Kanto region as well as the North, but are secretly defeated by Koma who runs around touching each of them.
52	"And Then There Were No Delinquents"; Transliteration: "Soshite Sono-go wa Hikō wa Nakatta" (Japanese: そしてその後は非行はなかった)	January 29, 2012
St. Ishiyama is closed due to harsh winter, but the students still come to school because they were not informed of this, until Kazuya and Azusa come in to tell them. Unable to go home due to the storm, everyone remains in school. Once the delinquents slowly got beaten up, Kazuya informs the others that the incidents are exactly the same as that in the counting song "100 Delinquents". As the song's events continue, everyone decides to try to capture the culprit. However, the men are eventually beat up, leaving only the women remaining. Aoi realizes that the culprit is actually Koma, who wanted the women to warm each other up naked in the cold while he stayed in the middle, and beats him up.
53	"Baby Beel's First Sailor Uniform/Furuichi Falls In Love"; Transliteration: "Berubou Hajimete no Seifuku.Furuichi koishimashita" (Japanese: ベル坊はじめての征服/古市恋しました)	February 5, 2012
The Demon King is interested in conquest shows and sets up an area that Baby Beel has to destroy by himself. Hilda is worried for Baby Beel's safety and decides to follow him along with Oga, Furuichi and Lamia. Beelzebub faces many obstacles, but is secretly helped by Oga and Lamia. The final destination happens to be Furuichi's house, where Furuichi tries to stop Baby Beel from destroying his house, but Baby Beel ends up destroying it by using Alaindelon as a weapon. Later, Furuichi is confronted by a shy girl. Koma notices it and informs Aoi that Furuichi might be possessed by a ghost. Worried, Oga and Aoi go to the infirmary to warn Furuichi about the girl. Upon reaching, they find out that Furuichi is aware that the girl is a ghost. Aoi asks the girl why she was possessing Furuichi, but the ghost turns out to be Johnny whom she loves. Johnny leaves Furuichi's body and the girl and confess his love to her and the girl and Johnny happily exit the room, leaving Furuichi heartbroken.
54	"Black Baby Beel Grows Up"; Transliteration: "Burakku Beruboo, Sodachimashita" (Japanese: 黒ベル坊、育ちました)	February 12, 2012
Oga and Furuichi and their teacher (which was the Spellmaster) was searching for the black version of Baby Beel. Oga thought that it was so bored that it ran away. But actually, it was because of Himekawa. They asked some girls if they saw someone with a baby, and they answered that they saw a nice looking, hot guy that smelled so nice. He took it because he believes that it was the key for their family to be more successful. In the end, Black Baby Beel was reunited with Oga's teacher.
55	"I Have Lost My Pompadour/The Great Demon Lord Has Come"; Transliteration: "Ri-zento, Nakushichaimashita/Daimaō, Kichaimashita" (Japanese: リーゼント、なくしちゃいました/大魔王、来ちゃいました)	February 19, 2012
Himekawa loses his hair gel so he cannot make his Pompadour. He wear his hair down, to which many girls at school fall for him.
56	"Are You A Traitor?/Is This A Job For Men?"; Transliteration: "Uragiri desu ka/otoko-tachi no ban ka" (Japanese: 裏切りですか/男たちの番か)	February 26, 2012
Hilda is worried that everyone is plotting an evil scheme and not including her.
57	"Won't You Eat a Manju?/Won't You Get In A Mixed Bath?"; Transliteration: "Manjuu, Tabemasen ka?/Konyoku, shimasen ka?" (Japanese: 饅頭、食べませんか？/混浴、しませんか？)	March 4, 2012
Koma sees Oga and Baby Beel practicing Super Milk Time and starts to think that if Aoi eats his Manju, he and Aoi will also switch bodies. Koma tries many different techniques but is rejected by Aoi every single time. A distressed Koma asks Baby Beel and Kota for help. Kota tell him a forbidden technique, chopping the manju into tiny pieces and mixing it into Aoi's food. Although this almost works, Aoi notices a perverted reaction on Koma's face and beats him. Hilda wins tickets to the hot spring and the whole Oga family goes on a vacation to the hot spring where they are greeted by a lady whom Oga mistakes for a demon. Along with Baby Beel, they go for a hot bath where Hilda tells Oga about her family. Elsewhere, Furuichi is enjoying skiing with some girls when Alaindelon interrupts and transports Furuichi to where Oga and the other are. Unaware of this, he enters the mixed bath, where Hilda and Oga talking and realizes that Hilda is in the same bath. Later, Oga along with Hilda and Baby Beel are sleeping in their room.
58	"Akumano Academy is Open"; Transliteration: "Akumano Gakuen Kaikō shimashita" (Japanese: 悪魔野学園、開校しました)	March 11, 2012
59	"We're the Strongest"; Transliteration: "Ore-tachi ga Saikyō desu" (Japanese: オレたちが最強です)	March 18, 2012
60	"I Won't Say Goodbye"; Transliteration: "Sayonara wa Iimasen" (Japanese: さよならは言いません)	March 25, 2012
One week has gone by since Oga defeated the 34 Pillar Division and Ishiyama High School/Akumano Academy is destroyed once again. All students of Ishiyama have become worried over Oga and Baby Beel being gone from the human world. Overwhelmed with sadness, the delinquents look back at their days with Oga. Hilda and Beelzebub comes back with a grand entrance, stating that the Great Demon Lord ordered Baby Beel to destroy humanity once again. Oga smiles and declines raising him, even though he knows he will, Baby Beel shocking him like before.
