= List of Beelzebub chapters =

Cover of the first volume of the Beelzebub manga series featuring the three primary characters, Tatsumi Oga, Beelzebub, and Hildegarde.

The manga series Beelzebub was written and illustrated by Ryūhei Tamura. It was serialized in Shueisha's Weekly Shōnen Jump magazine from February 2009 to February 2014, and then under the title Beelzebub Another in the same publisher's Shōnen Jump Next!! from May 2014 to March 2015. The first volume was released by Shueisha in July 2009, and the 28th and final one in May 2015.

== Volume list ==
No.	Title	Release date	ISBN
1	I Picked Up the Demon King (魔王ひろいました Maō Hiroimashita)	July 3, 2009	978-4-08-874732-3
Bub 1 "I Picked Up the Demon King" (魔王ひろいました, Maō Hiroimashita); Bub 2 "I Became a Gang Leader with a Child" (子連れ番長はじめました, Kozure Banchō Hajimemashita); Bub 3 "Damn Strong Evil Bastard" (強くて凶悪でクソヤロー, Tsuyokute Kyōaku de Kusoyarō); Bub 4 "Fly!!" (FLY!!, Furai!!); Bub 5 "Consider Yourself the Mother" (母親になったつもりで, Hahaoya ni Natta Tsumori de); Bub 6 "That" (あれ, Are); Bub 7 "Stop Fighting" (ケンカやめます, Kenka Yamemasu)
2	Two Women (女2人 Onna Futari)	September 4, 2009	978-4-08-874774-3
Bub 8 "Come? Won't Come?" (来る?来ない?, Kuru? Konai?); Bub 9 "Being a Man Means" (男は, Otoko wa); Bub 10 "Love Begins" (恋がはじまる, Koi ga Hajimaru); Bub 11 "Park Debut" (公園デビューします, Kōen Debyū Shimasu); Bub 12 "The Bored Demon King's Playing" (ヒマをもてあました魔王の遊び, Hima o Moteamashita Maō no Asobi); Bub 13 "The Man and Woman Who Meet Again" (再び出会った男と女, Futatabi Deatta Otoko to Onna); Bub 14 "The Second Meeting Is Unavoidable Destiny" (再び会ったが百年目, Futatabi Atta ga Hyaku Nen Me); Bub 15 "Hurricane of Love" (恋のハリケーン, Koi no Harikēn); Bub 16 "Two Women" (女2人, Onna Futari)
3	Entry!! (登場!! Tōjō!!)	November 4, 2009	978-4-08-874775-0
Bub 17 "You Are Unforgivable" (あんたは許さない, Anta wa Yurusanai); Bub 18 "The Duel" (決闘です, Kettō desu); Bub 19 "The Conclusion" (決着です, Ketchaku Desu); Bub 20 "Loss" (負け, Make); Bub 21 "When You Think About Summer, You Think of This, Right?" (夏といえばコレでしょう, Natsu to Ieba Kore Deshō); Bub 22 "He's a Man After All" (なかなか男じゃない, Nakanaka Otoko Janai); Bub 23 "Entry!!" (登場!!, Tōjō!!); Bub 24 "Get Out" (出てゆけ, Deteyuke); Bub 25 "Without a Trace" (きれいさっぱりと, Kirei Sappari to)
4	Fireworks and Fights Are Ishiyama's Specialties (花火とケンカは石矢魔名物 Hanabi to Kenka wa Ishiyama Meibutsu)	February 4, 2010	978-4-08-874797-2
Bub 26 "Fight" (戦い, Tatakai); Bub 27 "It Was Fun" (楽しかったぜ, Tanoshikatta ze); Bub 28 "The Doctor Is In" (医者が来ました, Isha ga Kimashita); Bub 29 "What Was I Thinking!?" (何考えてんだ!?, Nani Kangaetenda!?); Bub 30 "Let Us Join You" (仲間に入れて, Nakama ni Irete); Bub 31 "Everyone Assembled" (全員集合, Zen'in Shūgō); Bub 32 "Fireworks and Fights Are Ishiyama's Specialties" (花火とケンカは石矢魔名物, Hanabi to Kenka wa Ishiyama Meibutsu); Bub 33 "Which One!?" (どっち!?, Dotchi!?); Bub 34 "This One Is the Parent" (親はこっちです, Oya wa Kotchi Desu)
5	Honma kai (ほんまかい Honma kai)	April 2, 2010	978-4-08-870025-0
Bub 35 "Don't Bother Me" (邪魔すんな, Jama Sunna); Bub 36 "I Won" (勝った, Katta); Bub 37 "Ishiyama's Strongest" (石矢魔最強, Ishiyama Saikyō); Bub 38 "At the End of Summer" (夏のおわりに, Natsu no Owari ni); Bub 39 "The Mountainous Seclusion" (山ごもりです, Yamagomori Desu); Bub 40 "The Strongest Old Man" (最強の爺ちゃん, Saikyō no Jii Chan); Bub 41 "Honma kai" (ほんまかい, Honma kai); Bub 42 "He Died" (アイツが死んだ, Aitsu ga Shinda); Bub 43 "Enemies, Right" (敵だな, Teki Da na)
6	Saint Ishiyama Academy (聖石矢魔学園 Sento Ishiyama Gakuen)	June 4, 2010	978-4-08-870051-9
Bub 44 "Angelica" (アンジェリカ, Anjerika); Bub 45 "Get Big" (大きくなれよ, Ōkikunare yo); Bub 46 "Baby Beel Is Huge!!" (ベル坊巨大化!!, Beru Bō Kyodaika!!); Bub 47 "The End of the Adventure" (冒険のおわり, Bōken no Owari); Bub 48 "Saint Ishiyama Academy" (聖石矢魔学園, Sento Ishiyama Gakuen); Bub 49 "Summer Break Debut" (夏休みデビュー, Natsu Yatsumi Debyū); Bub 50 "Idiots Are No Good" (バカはダメよ, Baka wa Dame yo); Bub 51 "Come Out with Me for a Second" (ちょっとつき合って, Chotto Tsukiatte); Bub 52 "'Sword' Fight" (「刀」の戦い, "Katana" no Tatakai)
7	The All-Out Confrontation (全面対決です Zenmen Taiketsu Desu)	August 4, 2010	978-4-08-870090-8
Bub 53 "Quiz" (クイズです, Kuizu Desu); Bub 54 "Hajime Kanzaki" (神崎一, Kanzaki Hajime); Bub 55 "Everyone Go Home" (みんな帰ります, Minna Kaerimasu); Bub 56 "The All-Out Confrontation" (全面対決です, Zenmen Taiketsu Desu); Bub 57 "I Don't Know You" (てめーなんて知らねー, Temē Nante Shiranē); Bub 58 "Latecoming Man" (遅れてきた男, Okuretekita Otoko); Bub 59 "He's Finally Here" (あの人が来た, Ano Hito ga Kita); Bub 60 "Strongest" (最強, Saikyō); Bub 61 "The Next Fight Is" (次の戦いは, Tsugi no Tatakai wa); Special "The Great Midwinter Duel in the Midsummer!!" (真夏に真冬の大決闘!!, Manatsu ni Mafuyu no Dai Kettō!!)
8	Volleyball Match!! (バレーボール勝負!! Barēbōru Shōbu!!)	November 4, 2010	978-4-08-870128-8
Bub 62 "Booby Volley" (おっぱいバレー, Oppai Barē); Bub 63 "Volley or Die" (バレーか死か, Barē ka Shi ka); Bub 64 "You're the Captain" (てめーがキャプテン, Temē ga kKaputen); Bub 65 "What Am I Doing!?" (何やってんだ!?, Nani Yattenda!?); Bub 66 "I Don't Know You 2" (てめーなんて知らねー2, Temē Nante Shiranē Ni); Bub 67 "Oga vs. Miki!!" (男鹿VS三木!!); Bub 68 "Oga vs. Tōjō!!" (男鹿VS東条!!); Bub 69 "Saint Ishiyama Festival" (聖石舞祭, Sei-Ishi Busai); Bub 70 "Volleyball Match!!" (バレーボール勝負!!, Barēbōru Shōbu!!)
9	The Demon King Has Come (魔王が来たりて Maō ga Kitarite)	December 29, 2010	978-4-08-870165-3
Bub 71 "Secret Weapon!?" (秘密兵器!?, Himitsu Heiki!?); Bub 72 "I Won't Let This End!!" (終わらせない!!, Owarasenai!!); Bub 73 "The Man Who Came to Destroy" (ぶっ壊しにきた男, Bukkowashi ni Kita Otoko); Bub 74 "Can You Endure It?" (ガマンできる?, Gaman Dekiru?); Bub 75 "Back to Back" (背中合わせ, Senaka Awase); Bub 76 "The Demon King Has Come" (魔王が来たりて, Maō ga Kitarite); Bub 77 "A New __" (新しい○○です, Atarashii __ desu); Bub 78 "Zenjūrō Saotome" (早乙女禅十郎); Bub 79 "I'm Not Your Enemy (敵じゃないよ, Teki ja nai yo)
10	The Crybaby Brothers (泣きむし兄弟 Nakimushi Kyōdai)	March 4, 2011	978-4-08-870193-6
Bub 80 "They Came" (来ました, Kimashita); Bub 81 "Destroy Humanity" (人間滅ぼす, Ningen Horobosu); Bub 82 "The Crybaby Brothers" (泣きむし兄弟, Nakimushi Kyōdai); Bub 83 "Behemoth's Pillar Squad" (ベヘモット柱師団, Behemotto Chūshidan); Bub 84 "Confrontation!!" (対決!!, Taiketsu!!); Bub 85 "Demon? Not a Demon?" (悪魔?悪魔じゃない?, Akuma? Akuma Janai?); Bub 86 "Will Die" (死でしまいます, Shindeshimaimasu); Bub 87 "I Never Expected This to Happen" (こんなの予想外, Konna no Yosōgai); Bub 88 "It Pisses Me Off" (ムカつく, Mukatsuku); Special "BeelBeelSaiyūki: Let's Head for Tenjiku!!" (ベルベル☆西遊記〜天竺までぶっとばせ!!〜, Beruberu Saiyūki: Tenjiku made Buttobase!!)
11	Video Game Match!! (ゲーム勝負!! Gēmu Shōbu!!)	May 2, 2011	978-4-08-870223-0
Bub 89 "I'm So Weak" (オレって弱い, Ore 'te Yowai); Bub 90 "The Training!!" (ザ・修業!!, Z Shugyō!!); Bub 91 "The Mountainous Seclusion 2" (山ごもりです2, Yamagomori Desu 2); Bub 92 "Stone and Spirit" (石と意地と, Ishi to Iji to); Bub 93 "Demon's __" (悪魔の○○, Akuma no __); Bub 94 "If the Secret's Out, It's Over (バレたら大変, Baretara Taihen); Bub 95 "The Surfing Prince" (ネトゲのエンオウ, Netoge no En'ō); Bub 96 "Video Game Match!!" (ゲーム勝負!!, Gēmu Shōbu!!); Bub 97 "The End of War" (ジ・エンド・オブ・ウォー, Ji Endo obu Wō)
12	Hilda's Anger (ヒルダの怒り Hiruda no Ikari)	July 4, 2011	978-4-08-870259-9
Bub 98 "I Won't Cast Away My Pride!" (意地は捨てない, Iji wa Sutenai); Bub 99 "Cheat!?" (イカサマ!?, Ikasama!?); Bub 100 "Follow Baby Beel!!" (ベル坊を追えっ!!, Beru Bō o Oe'!!); Bub 101 "Game Over!!" (勝負アリ!!, Shōbu Ari!!); Bub 102 "Found You!" (見っけ!, Mikke!); Bub 103 "What Are They Doing Next Door!?" (隣は何をする人ぞ!?, Tonari wa Nani o Suru Hito zo!?); Bub 104 "Hilda's Anger" (ヒルダの怒り, Hiruda no Ikari); Bub 105 "Demons Again" (悪魔がふたたび, Akuma ga Futatabi); Bub 106 "Oga's Fight" (男鹿の戦い, Oga no Tatakai)
13	Be Like Oga (男鹿らしくしなさい Oga Rashiku Shinasai)	September 2, 2011	978-4-08-870286-5
Bub 107 "I'm..." (オレが..., Ore ga...); Bub 108 "Super Milk Time" (スーパーミルクタイム, Sūpā Miruku Taimu); Bub 109 "The End of the Fight!? The Start!?" (戦いの終わり!?始まり!?, Tatakai no Owari!? Hajimari!?); Bub 110 "Case Closed for Now!?" (とりあえず一件落着!?, Toriaezu Ikken Rakuchaku!?); Bub 111 "Body Exchange" (入れ替わっちゃいました, Irekawatchaimashita); Bub 112 "Be Like Oga" (男鹿らしくしなさい, Oga rashiku Shinasai); Bub 113 "Catfight" (女の戦い, Onna no Tatakai); Bub 114 "The Red Tails Fight" (烈怒帝瑠大作戦, Reddo Teiru Daisakusen); Bub 115 "Kunieda and That Guy" (邦枝とあの子, Kunieda to Anoko)
14	Intrusion! Akumano Academy (侵入!悪魔野学園 Shinnyū! Akumano Gakuen)	December 2, 2011	978-4-08-870318-3
Bub 116 "Ishiyama High Restoration" (石矢魔高校復活, Ishiyama Kōkō Fukkatsu); Bub 117 "Greeting" (挨拶, Aisatsu); Bub 118 "Intrusion! Akumano Academy" (侵入!悪魔野学園, Shinnyū! Akumano Gakuen); Bub 119 "Clash vs. Agiel!!" (激突!!vsアギエル!!, Gekitotsu vs. Agieru!!); Bub 120 "General" (大将, Taishō); Bub 121 "Game" (ゲーム, Gēmu); Bub 122 "Strongest Team" (最強チーム, Saikyō Chīmu); Bub 123 "Akumano HR" (悪魔野HR); Bub 124 "Decapitation Island" (首切島, Kubikirijima)
15	The King and Oga (王と男鹿 Ō to Oga)	March 2, 2012	978-4-08-870373-2
Bub 125 "Suiten Ikaruga" (斑鳩 酔天, Ikaruga Suiten); Bub 126 "Vs. Islanders!?" (VS島民!?, Vs. Tōmin!?); Bub 127 "Special Training Practice" (実戦特訓, Jissen Tokkun); Bub 128 "Nazuna and Zen" (薺と禅, Nazuna to Zen); Bub 129 "The Captured Demon Maids" (囚われの侍女悪魔たち, Toraware no Jijo Akuma Tachi); Bub 130 "Oga's Return" (男鹿の帰還, Oga no Kikan); Bub 131 "My Arithmetic Is Poor" (算数は苦手, Sansū wa Nigate); Bub 132 "The King and Oga" (王と男鹿, Ō to Oga); Bub 133 "Fight" (ケンカ, Kenka); Bub 134 "Girls' Battle" (ガールズバトル, Gāruzu Batoru)
16	Tatsumi (たつみさん Tatsumi San)	June 4, 2012	978-4-08-870405-0
Bub 135 "Game" (ゲーム, Gēmu); Bub 136 "Supreme Commander" (総大将, Sōdaishō); Bub 137 "Vs. Jabberwock" (VSジャバウォック); Bub 138 "The Demon King's Dad" (魔王のお父さん, Maō no Otōsan); Bub 139 "Tatsumi-san" (たつみさん); Bub 140 "We're Going to Get Your Memories Back!!" (記憶を取り戻すのダッ!!, Kioku o Torimodosu no da!!); Bub 141 "The Amnesic Demon Maid" (記憶喪失の侍女悪魔, Kioku Sōshitsu no Jijo Akuma); Bub 142 "The Prince's Kiss" (王子のくちづけ, Ōji no Kuchizuke); Bub 143 "Young Boss" (若, Waka)
17	We're Going on a Field Trip!! (修学旅行に行くのダッ!! Shūgaku Ryokō ni Iku no Da'!!)	August 3, 2012	978-4-08-870480-7
Bub 144 "Futaba-chan" (二葉ちゃん); Bub 145 "Stone Skipping" (水切り, Mizukiri); Bub 146 "We're Going on a Field Trip!!" (修学旅行に行くのダッ!!, Shūgaku Ryokō ni Iku no da!!); Bub 147 "Child Carrying Gang Leader in Field Trip" (子連れ番長in修学旅行, Kozure Banchō in Shūgaku Ryokō); Bub 148 "Izō Aiba" (哀場猪蔵); Bub 149 "Chiyo Aiba" (哀場千夜); Bub 150 "Churai" (ちゅらい); Bub 151 "Storm of Love" (恋の嵐, Koi no Arashi); Bub 152 "Lost Child" (まいご, Maigo)
18	We're Going to the Hero Show!! (ヒーローショーに行くのダ!! Hīrō Shō ni Iku no Da!!)	October 4, 2012	978-4-08-870519-4
Bub 153 "General" (大将, Taishō); Bub 154 "Showdown of the Child Carrying Gang Leaders" (子連れ番長対決, Kozure Banchō Taiketsu); Bub 155 "End of the School Trip!!" (修学旅行おしまい!!, Shūgaku Ryokō Oshimai!!); Bub 156 "Baby Driver" (赤ちゃんドライバー, Aka Chan Doraibā); Bub 157 "We're Going to the Hero Show!!" (ヒーローショーに行くのダ!!, Hīrō Shō ni Iku no da!!); Bub 158 "We're Going to Be in the Hero Show!!" (ヒーローショーに出るのダッ!!, Hīrō Shō ni Deru no Da'!!); Bub 159 "The End of the Hero Show!!" (ヒーローショー決着!!, Hīrō Shō Ketchaku!!); Bub 160 "Video Letter" (ビデオレター, Bideo Retā); Bub 161 "Saint Marcus Private Academy of Fine Arts" (私立サンマルクス修道学院, Shiritsu San Marukusu Shūdō Gakuin); Special "Beelzebubbubbub" (べるぜバブバブバブ, Beruzebabubabubabu)
19	Pompadour (リーゼント Rīzento)	December 4, 2012	978-4-08-870554-5
Bub 162 "Spur of the Moment Fighter" (飛び入りファイター, Tobiiri Faitā); Bub 163 "Falling Out" (仲間割れ, Nakamaware); Bub 164 "Disgust" (嫌なところ, Iya na Tokoro); Bub 165 "Pompadour" (リーゼント, Rīzento); Bub 166 "Mother" (母君, Hahagimi); Bub 167 "The Man I Fell in Love with" (惚れた男, Horeta Otoko); Bub 168 "Fiancée" (許嫁, Iinazuke); Bub 169 "Furuichi Panic" (古市パニック, Furuichi Panikku); Bub 170 "Mobichi Grows Out!?" (モブ市卒業!?, Mobuichi Sotsugyō!?)
20	Oga vs. Furuichi (男鹿VS古市)	March 4, 2013	978-4-08-870619-1
Bub 171 "Furuichi vs. Shinki!!" (古市VS神姫!!); Bub 172 "Furuichi vs. Tōjō" (古市VS東条); Bub 173 "Oga vs. Furuichi" (男鹿VS古市); Bub 174 "Tatsumi and Takachin" (たつみ君とたかちん, Tatsumi-kun to Takachin); Bub 175 "Damn! Strong Already" (強えじゃねーか, Tsuē Janē ka); Bub 176 "The Season is Already Winter" (季節はもう冬, Kisetsu wa Mō Fuyu); Bub 177 "Christmas Is Coming!! (Part 1)" (クリスマスがやって来るのダ!!その①, Kurisumasu ga Yattekuru no da!! Sono (1)); Bub 178 "Christmas Is Coming!! (Part 2)" (クリスマスがやって来るのダ!!その②, Kurisumasu ga Yattekuru no da!! Sono (1)); Bub 179 "The Curtain Rises! Saint Saint X'mas!!" (開幕!聖セントX'mas!!, Kaimaku! Sento Sento X'mas!!)
21	The Final Decisive X'mas Battle!! (X'mas最終決戦!! Kurisumasu Saishū Kessen!!)	May 2, 2013	978-4-08-870664-1
Bub 180 "The Tournament Starts!!" (トーナメントが始まるのダ!!, Tōnamento ga Hajimaru no da!!); Bub 181 "Showdown! The Strongest Couple!!" (対決!最強夫婦!!, Taiketsu! Saikyō Fūfu!); Bub 182 "Fierce Battle!! Best 8" (激戦!!ベスト8, Gekisen!! Besuto 8); Bub 183 "Ishiyama Battle!!" (石矢魔対決!!, Ishiyama Taiketsu!!); Bub 184 "Semi Finals! vs. Tōjō!" (準決勝!VS東条!, Junkesshō! Vs. Tōjō!); Bub 185 "The Final Decisive X'mas Battle!! (1)" (X'mas最終決戦!!①, X'mas Saishū Kessen!! (1)); Bub 186 "The Final Decisive X'mas Battle!! (2)" (X'mas最終決戦!!②, X'mas Saishū Kessen!! (2)); Bub 187 "Trial!" (お試しダッ!, Otameshida!); Bub 188 "The Den of Hoodlums" (復活の魔窟, Fukkatsu no Makutsu)
22	Ishiyama's Six Upstarts (殺六縁起 Satsuriku Engi)	July 4, 2013	978-4-08-870767-9
Bub 189 "Oh! My Eggplant" (OH!MYナスビ, Oh! My Nasubi); Bub 190 "Ishiyama's Six Upstarts" (殺六縁起, Satsuriku Engi); Bub 191 "Who's Going to Beat Oga?" (誰が獲るんだ男鹿の首, Dare ga Torunda Oga no Kubi); Bub 192 "That's Exactly What I Was Going to Do" (そのつもりだっつの, Sono Tsumori dattsu no); Bub 193 "Vs. the Poltergeists!!" (VS騒霊組!!, Vs. Sōreigumi!!); Bub 194 "Kanzaki Strikes Back" (逆襲の神崎, Gyakushū no Kanzaki); Bub 195 "Daddy Switch!!" (お父さんスイッチ!!, Otōsan Suitchi!!); Bub 196 "The Weight of His Fists" (拳の重さ, Kobushi no Omosa); Bub 197 "This Is Bad!" (まずくね?, Mazukune?)
23	The King's Crest for Dummies (よく分かる王臣紋 Yoku Wakaru Ōshinmon)	September 4, 2013	978-4-08-870803-4
Bub 198 "Clash of the New and Old!! Red Tail" (新旧激突!!烈怒帝瑠, Shinkyū Gekitotsu!! Reddo Teiru); Bub 199 "Go Get Her" (やっちまえよ, Yatchimae yo); Bub 200 "Third Generation Leader" (3代目総長, 3-daime Sōchō); Bub 201 "The Queen, Dancing" (クイーン、舞う, Kuīn, Mau); Bub 202 "The King's Crest for Dummies" (よく分かる王臣紋, Yoku Wakaru Ōshinmon); Bub 203 "The Traitorous Resent" (裏切リーゼント, Uragirīzento); Bub 204 "The Captured Tactician" (囚われの智将, Toraware no Chishō); Bub 205 "Furuichi Runs on Hecados' Power" (ヘカドスの威を借る古市, Hekadosu no I o Karu Furuichi); Bub 206 "Elder Pupil!" (兄弟子!, Ani Deshi!)
24	Takamiya and Lucifer (鷹宮とルシファー Takamiya to Rushifā)	November 1, 2013	978-4-08-870836-2
Bub 207 "You're the One Who's Going to Die" (死ぬのはてめーだ, Shinu no wa Temē Da); Bub 208 "Furuichi Is Dead!!?" (古市死す!!?, Furuichi Shisu!!?); Bub 209 "Tōhō Shin(ki)" (東邦神（姫）); Bub 210 "I Don't Have That" (ねーよ そんなもん, Nē yo Sonna Mon); Bub 211 "The Tōjō of Tennis" (テニスの東条様, Tenisu no Tōjō-sama); Bub 212 "The Least Suited Man" (似合わねー男, Niawanē Otoko); Bub 213 "Takamiya and Lucifer" (鷹宮とルシファー, Takamiya to Rushifā); Bub 214 "Blooming" (開花, Kaika); Bub 215 "Baby Beel is Gone" (消えたベル坊, Kieta Beru Bō)
25	Infighting!! Triple Furuichi (迫撃!! トリプル古市 Hakugeki!! Toripuru Furuichi)	January 4, 2014	978-4-08-870889-8
Bub 216 "Dah-Dah-Dah-Dah-Dash!!" (ダダダダダッシュ!!, Dadadadadasshu!!); Bub 217 "Double-Crosser" (クソ裏切り野郎, Kuso Uragiri Yarō); Bub 218 "Checkmate" (チェックメイト, Chekkumeito); Bub 219 "Absurdity Reigns!!" (不合理上等!!, Fugōri Jōtō!!); Bub 220 "Ishiyama's Head Dog" (石矢魔のてっぺん, Ishiyama no Teppen); Bub 221 "Farewell!? Furuichi!!" (さらば!?古市!!, Saraba!? Furuichi!!); Bub 222 "Fighting!! Triple Furuichi" (迫撃!! トリプル古市, Hakugeki!! Toripuru Furuichi); Bub 223 "Even with Three of Them, Furuichi Is an Idiot" (3人寄っても古市はバカ, 3-nin Yottemo Furuichi wa Baka); Bub 224 "The Crab and the Joke" (蟹とたわむる, Kani to Tawamuru)
26	How Far Is Mom's House? (母を訪ねて何千里? Haha o Tazunete Nanzenri?)	April 4, 2014	978-4-08-880042-4
Bub 225 "Fuckin' Jap!!" (ファッキンジャップ!!, Fakkin Jappu!!); Bub 226 "How Far Is Mom's House?" (母を訪ねて何千里?, Haha o Tazunete Nanzenri?); Bub 227 "Genuine Thug" (本場のヤンキー, Honba no Yankī); Bub 228 "Captain Fuck" (ファック様だ, Fakku-sama da); Bub 229 "Father and Son and Mother" (父と子と母と, Chichi to Ko to Haha to); Bub 230 "A Mother Always Worries" (お母さんは心配性, Okāsan wa Shinpaishō); Bub 231 "It Was a Fun Ride" (楽しかったぜ, Tanoshikatta ze); Bub 232 "Back to Ishiyama" (バック トゥ石矢魔, Bakku to~u Ishiyama); Bub 233 "Ishiyama, a Mountain of Stones" (石矢魔石だらけ, Ishiyama Ishi darake)
27	Goodbub!! Ishiyama High (グッドバブ!!石矢魔高校 Guddobabu!! Ishiyama Kōkō)	June 4, 2014	978-4-08-880070-7
Bub 234 "Just a Monster" (ただの化物, Tada no Bakemono); Bub 235 "Countdown" (カウントダウン, Kauntodaun); Bub 236 "Enough Already" (いい加減にして, Ii Kagen ni Shite); Bub 237 "Guess I'll Show You" (しょーがねーから, Shō ga Nē kara); Bub 238 "The Final Attack" (最後の一撃, Saigo no Ichigeki); Bub 239 "Zebul Finisher" (ゼブルフィニッシャー, Zeburu Finisshā); Last Bub "Goodbub!! Ishiyama High" (グッドバブ!!石矢魔高校, Guddobabu!! Ishiyama Kōkō); Special 1 "They Were Fighting" (ケンカしちゃいました, Kenka-shichaimashita); Special 2 "Kappa" (かっぱ); Special 3 "Mr. Rice" (ごはんくん, Gohan-kun)
28	Parent and Child (親と子 Oya to Ko)	May 1, 2015	978-4-08-880411-8
extra Bub 1 "You Can Make 100 Friends, Can You?" (友達100人出来るかな?, Tomodachi Hyaku Nin Dekiru ka na?); extra Bub 2 "Badump! It's All Ishiyama Up in This Beach!" (ドキッ♥石矢魔だらけの海水浴場!, Doki Ishiyama Darake no Kaisui Yokujō!); extra Bub 3 "The Diary of the Ishiyama Boys Adrift at Sea" (石矢魔少年漂流記, Ishiyama Shōnen Hyōryūki); extra Bub 4 "Furuichi the Hero" (古市・ザ・ヒーロー, Furuichi za Hīrō); extra Bub 5 "Love Blooms in the Season of Parting!!" (別れの季節に恋は咲く!!, Wakare no Kisetsu ni Koi wa Saku!!); extra Bub 6 "Parent and Child" (親と子, Oya to Ko)
