= Bentame Jump =

Japanese quarterly manga magazine

- Categories: Shōnen manga
- Frequency: Quarterly
- First issue: April 1, 2023
- Company: Shueisha
- Country: Japan
- Language: Japanese
- Website: Official website (in Japanese)

Bentame Jump (Japanese: 勉タメジャンプ, Hepburn: Bentame Janpu) is a Japanese quarterly manga magazine published by Shueisha. The magazine was started on April 1, 2023, with educational one-shots and serialized manga from famous manga creators, and is aimed at "all elementary and middle school kids who love curiosity, and all grown-ups who haven't forgotten their curiosity!". The magazine was originally intended to only have three issues, but on March 15 the fourth issue was launched.

== Features ==
=== Current series ===
Series title	Author(s)	Premiere issue
Bokutachi Zenzen Kowakunai Ryu (ぼくたちぜんぜん恐くない竜)	Retsu	April 2023
Jimoto ga Japan Bentame-hen (ジモトが ジャパン 勉タメ編)	Seiji Hayashi	March 2024
Jintai Rescue Tankentai: VISCERIS VOYAGE (人体レスキュー探検隊-VISCERIS VOYAGE-)	Boichi	April 2023
Kotobadou (コトバドウ)	Ryou Nakama	March 2024
Sebeku-chan wa Kamitsu Kitai (セベクちゃんは噛みつきたい)	Ryuhei Tamura	April 2023

=== Former series ===
Series title	Author(s)	Premiere issue	Final issue
Inu Eigo (犬英語)	Haruichi Furudate	April 2023	July 2024
Nazotoki Hakase no Hirameki Iseki Tankenki (ナゾトキ博士のヒラメキ遺跡探検記)	Ito Kamemura, Yuuki Kawaguchi	April 2023	December 2023
YouTube Kyoushitsu (YouTube教室)	Tomohiro Hasegawa	April 2023	December 2023
Wako Chako Youko no Kantan Recipe (ワコ・チャコ・ヨーコのふわレシピ)	Taishi Tsutsui	April 2023	October 2024
