= Hard-Boiled Cop and Dolphin =

Japanese manga series

- Cover of the first tankōbon volume, featuring Samejima

灼熱のニライカナイ (Shakunetsu no Nirai Kanai)
- Genre: Adventure; Fantasy comedy
- Manga
- Written by: Ryuhei Tamura
- Published by: Shueisha
- English publisher: NA: Viz Media
- Imprint: Jump Comics
- Magazine: Weekly Shōnen Jump
- Original run: June 27, 2020 – June 21, 2021
- Volumes: 5
- icon

Hard-Boiled Cop and Dolphin (Japanese: 灼熱のニライカナイ, Hepburn: Shakunetsu no Nirai Kanai; lit. 'Red Hot Nirai Kanai') is a Japanese manga series written and illustrated by Ryuhei Tamura. It was serialized in Shueisha's shōnen manga magazine Weekly Shōnen Jump from June 2020 to June 2021. The series was published digitally in English by Viz Media.

== Plot summary ==
Trouble-making police detective Boyle Samejima, who is not averse to breaking rules to get the job done, is transferred from Shinjuku, Tokyo to the laid-back Ogasawara Islands. Now at the Anegashima Police Department, Samejima investigates the bizarre unsolved case of "The Cult of the Sea" (海の教団), where a religious cult who worshiped a little girl as their oracle suddenly vanished. That little girl, Chako, has recently returned with a humanoid dolphin named Orpheus, whom she calls "Papa." Orpheus joins the police department on the same day as Samejima, as his partner and superior.

== Characters ==
Boyle Samejima (鮫島 灼熱, Samejima Boiru)
Boyle is a cop who tries to play, "The Loose Cannon". Though rough around the edges, he does take his job seriously, and will put the lives of others first. He is often called by his nickname Shark.
Orpheus F. Lipper (オルフェウス・F・リッパー, Orufeusu F Rippā)
A humanoid Dolphin and Boyle's partner. Like Boyle, his is rough around the edges, but still someone who would risk his life to protect others. He has all the abilities of a dolphin enhanced to superhuman levels.
Chako (チャコ)
The oracle of the cult of the sea. She is very much like a child with an active imagination, but has the strange ability to evolve sea life into humanoid forms, but she is not aware she has this power.

== Publication ==
Written and illustrated by Ryuhei Tamura, Hard-Boiled Cop and Dolphin was serialized in Shueisha's shōnen manga magazine Weekly Shōnen Jump from June 27, 2020, to June 21, 2021. Shueisha collected its chapters in five tankōbon volumes, released from November 4, 2020, to October 4, 2021.

The series is published digitally in English language by Viz Media. Viz Media started releasing its volumes digitally on November 23, 2021.

=== Volumes ===
No.	Original release date	Original ISBN	English release date	English ISBN
1	November 4, 2020	978-4-08-882510-6	November 23, 2021	978-1-9747-2231-0
Depth 01. "Dolphin and Shark"; Depth 02. "The Little Detective"; Depth 03. "The Crimes of the 95 Percent"; Depth 04. "Oracle of Revelations"; Depth 05. "A Warning to All Poachers"; Depth 06. "Umi's Woo-Hoo!!"; Depth 07. "A Messenger from the Dragon Palace"
2	February 4, 2021	978-4-08-882622-6	February 22, 2022	978-1-9747-3153-4
Depth 08. "Distinguish Yourself"; Depth 09. "Ocean Gangs"; Depth 10. "The Death of Samejima"; Depth 11. "The World's Fastest Fish"; Depth 12. "Gangster Mermaid"; Depth 13. "A Day in Island Life"; Depth 14. "Umineko When It Rains"; Depth 15. "High Tide Blues Part 1"; Depth 16. "High Tide Blues Part 2"; Depth 17. "High Tide Blues Part 3"
3	April 2, 2021	978-4-08-882647-9	May 24, 2022	978-1-9747-3295-1
Depth 18. "The Man Named Kamuro"; Depth 19. "Lies and Prophecies"; Depth 20. "Apartment on Fire"; Depth 21. "Shark and Dolphin's Mansion Inspection, Part 1"; Depth 22. "Shark and Dolphin's Mansion Inspection, Part 2"; Depth 23. "The Marine Mobile Investigations Unit"; Depth 24. "Sunken Ruins"; Depth 25. "Sunken Ruins Part 2"; Depth 26. "Sunken Ruins Part 3"
4	July 2, 2021	978-4-08-882757-5	August 23, 2022	978-1-9747-3383-5
Depth 27. "Sunken Ruins Part 4"; Depth 28. "Sunken Ruins Part 5"; Depth 29. "Sunken Ruins Part 6"; Depth 30. "Sunken Ruins Part 7"; Depth 31. "Sunken Ruins Part 8"; Depth 32. "Sunken Ruins Part 9"; Depth 33. "Sunken Ruins Part 10"; Depth 34. "The City in a Kelp Forest"; Depth 35. "The Depths of Ogasawara"
5	October 4, 2021	978-4-08-882816-9	November 22, 2022	978-1-9747-3570-9
Depth 36. "Partner"; Depth 37. "Ocean Encounters"; Depth 38. "Watershed"; Depth 39. "Farewells"; Depth 40. "As Your Friend"; Depth 41. "Orpheus"; Depth 42. "No Matter What Happens To Me"; Depth 43. "Officer's Pride"; Depth 44. "Days Like Bubbles"; Depth 45. "Sinking Anegashima"; Depth 46. "Nirai-Kanai: The Land of the Gods"; Depth 47. "epilogos"
