= Beelzebub (manga) =

Japanese manga series

- First tankōbon volume cover, featuring Tatsumi Oga (front), Beelzebub (on Tatsumi's shoulder), and Hildegarde (back)

ベルゼバブ (Beruzebabu)
- Genre: Action; Comedy; Supernatural
- Manga
- Written by: Ryuhei Tamura
- Published by: Shueisha
- Imprint: Jump Comics
- Magazine: Weekly Shōnen Jump; (February 23, 2009 – February 24, 2014); Jump Next!; (May 7, 2014 – March 13, 2015)
- Original run: February 23, 2009 – March 13, 2015
- Volumes: 28
- Original video animation
- Directed by: Yoshihiro Takamoto
- Written by: Masahiro Yokotani
- Music by: Yasuharu Takanashi; Kenji Fujisawa
- Studio: Pierrot+
- Released: October 23, 2010
- Runtime: 34 minutes
- Anime television series
- Directed by: Yoshihiro Takamoto
- Produced by: Kōji Nagai; Makoto Furukawa
- Written by: Masahiro Yokotani
- Music by: Yasuharu Takanashi; Kenji Fujisawa
- Studio: Pierrot+
- Licensed by: NA: Discotek Media; SA/SEA: Muse Communication
- Original network: NNS (ytv)
- English network: SEA: Animax Asia
- Original run: January 9, 2011 – March 25, 2012
- Episodes: 60
- icon

Beelzebub (Japanese: べるぜバブ, Hepburn: Beruzebabu) is a Japanese manga series written and illustrated by Ryuhei Tamura. It is the story about a first year student at a school for juvenile delinquents. It was first published in 2008 as a one-shot in Shueisha's Weekly Shōnen Jump, subsequently winning the fourth Gold Future Cup. The manga was serialized in the same magazine from February 2009 to February 2014. A spin-off series, Beelzebub: Bangai-hen, was serialized in Jump Next! from May 2014 to March 2015. The overall series's chapters were collected in 28 tankōbon volumes.

An original video animation (OVA) adaptation, produced by Pierrot+, premiered at the Jump Super Anime Tour in October 2010. A 60-episode anime television series adaptation, produced by the same studio, aired between January 2011 and March 2012.

== Plot ==
The story follows Tatsumi Oga, a delinquent student at Ishiyama High, who discovers an infant boy inside a dying man by a river. The child, Beel, is revealed to be the son of the Great Demon Lord, and Tatsumi is forced to raise him alongside the demon maid Hilda. Seeking to rid himself of this responsibility, Tatsumi attempts to transfer Beel to stronger students, targeting the Tōhōshinki—Ishiyama's four most powerful fighters. After defeating their leader, Hajime Kanzaki, Tatsumi inadvertently strengthens Beel's attachment to him. A supernatural seal appears on Tatsumi's hand, marking his contract with Beel. Its complexity grows with Tatsumi's malevolence, though he initially resists fighting to curb its spread. When Himekawa, the second Tōhōshinki member, kidnaps Hilda and Tatsumi's friend Furuichi, Tatsumi intervenes, unleashing the Zebul blast to win. The battle expands the seal, alarming Hilda with its toll.

Tatsumi later meets Aoi Kunieda, a girl who mistakes his bluntness for romantic interest. Unaware she leads the Red Tails and is the Tōhōshinki's third member, he asks her to become Beel's "mother," further confusing her. Their confrontation is interrupted by the MK5 assassins, whom Tatsumi defeats. Beel senses the fourth Tōhōshinki member, Hidetora Tojo, but Tatsumi remains oblivious. Aoi, believing Tatsumi and Hilda are married, is challenged by Hilda to test her strength but is deemed inferior. Meanwhile, Tatsumi is framed for attacking classmates by the MK5, prompting Aoi to fight him. Natsume exposes the deception, but Tatsumi defeats the conspirators.

Seeking to offload Beel, Tatsumi pursues Tojo at the beach, unaware Kanzaki and Himekawa orchestrated the clash. Aoi warns Tatsumi of Tojo's strength, but their duel is delayed when Beel falls ill. Beel's sickness severs Tatsumi's seal, and Hilda departs for the demon world for aid. Tatsumi later finds Tojo carrying Beel and loses their first fight. Returning home, he learns from the demon doctor Furucas that Beel's illness stems from suppressed power. Restored by Furucas's assistant Lamia, Tatsumi, aided by the Tōhōshinki, defeats Tojo in a rematch—but Beel's unleashed energy destroys Ishiyama High.

The students transfer to Saint Ishiyama, where discrimination ends after Tatsumi's team defeats the elite Six Knights in volleyball. The school president, secretly a demon, covers up Tatsumi's supernatural display during the match. A new teacher, Zenjirō Saotome, arrives, effortlessly subduing Tatsumi and Tojo. When demons attack Tatsumi's group, Saotome reveals himself as a Spellmaster and repels them. He trains Tatsumi, who later defeats powerful human-demon contractors. The story concludes with Tatsumi returning from the demon world, carrying another mysterious infant.

== Characters ==
=== Main characters ===
Tatsumi Oga (男鹿 辰巳, Oga Tatsumi)
Voiced by: Katsuyuki Konishi
A first-year student at Ishiyama High School and is renowned for his extraordinary strength, which strikes fear into the local delinquents. Alaindelon chooses him to be Beelzebub's father because he appears to possess the qualities of the ideal parent for the future Devil King: he is strong, arrogant, and thinks nothing of his fellow man. Despite his violent and selfish personality, he continues to care for Beelzebub, grumbling about it all the while. Through battles against delinquents and demons, he matures and gradually learns to control Beelzebub's immense magical power.
Kaiser de Emperana Beelzebub IV (カイゼル・デ・エンペラーナ・ベルゼバブ4世, Kaizeru de Enperāna Beruzebabu Yonsei)
Voiced by: Ayumi Fujimura (Vomic), Miyuki Sawashiro (anime)
Known as Beelzebub or Baby Beel (ベル坊, Beru Bō). He is the youngest son of the Devil King. He is very attached to Tatsumi, always clinging onto Tatsumi's back or sitting on Tatsumi's head. When he becomes agitated (and initially when he saw blood), he'll often throw a tantrum that will spontaneously electrocute anyone within his vicinity. Without Tatsumi, he is physically weaker than even the average human child, but contact with Tatsumi allows him to unleash his demonic powers. After fearing for Tatsumi's safety when he contracted a fever (as his power would end up killing Tatsumi), he severed the contract and ran away. He then became somewhat attached to Tojo, who resembles Tatsumi (at least in his own mind). Later, when Tatsumi and Tojo start to fight, Beel snaps out of his fever and goes back to Tatsumi. At that point, their mutual trust becomes so great that Beel even erases the Zebub spell to allow Tatsumi to fight Tojo without using demonic powers.

Hilda (ヒルダ, Hiruda) / Hildegarde (ヒルデガルダ, Hirudegaruda)
Voiced by: Kana Ueda (Vomic), Shizuka Itō (anime)
Hilda is a demon maid who helps Tatsumi take care of Beelzebub IV. She reveres the Great Demon Lord and considers it an honor to be chosen as Beel's caretaker. Although she is usually blunt and cold, she has a kinder side that emerges occasionally, often surprising and disbelieving others.
Takayuki Furuichi (古市 貴之, Furuichi Takayuki)
Voiced by: Takayuki Kondō (Vomic), Takahiro Mizushima (anime)
Another first year student at Ishiyama, Furuichi seems to be the only non-delinquent student there and has little, if any, fighting ability. He often points out the absurdities in Tatsumi's situation, acting as the rational and most passive member of the group. Furuichi often complains about Tatsumi, stating that just because he hangs around with him, people take him for a delinquent as well. Furuichi is the eldest child of his family, which seems to be wealthier than Tatsumi's, since they are able to spend summer holidays in a five-star resort. He is also implied to be quite a good student, and Miki says that his grades would have easily earned him a place in Saint Ishiyama School. Furuichi is a prototypical lovelorn teenager and is always scheming to ingratiate himself with the fair sex to little avail: most women—human and demon alike—around are stronger than he, and many moments of comic relief in the series arise when Furuichi has his advances on girls frustrated. He is envious of Tatsumi for being the object of Kunieda's love and for having Hilda under the same roof.
Batim do Emuna Alaindelon (バティム・ド・エムナ・アランドロン, Batimu Do Emuna Arandoron)
Voiced by: Wataru Takagi
Batim is a dimensional transfer demon working under Hildegarde. He sees Tatsumi forcing other delinquents to kneel before him and decides to deliver baby Beel to him as a potential parent. He is heavily built and is most often seen wearing a tank-top and boxer-shorts. After Tatsumi becomes Beel's parent he moves in with Furuichi, against the boy's wishes. It is later revealed that he has a daughter, but in the course of the story he also displays homosexual affection for Furuichi, much to the latter's chagrin. These tendencies are exaggerated in the anime.

=== Ishiyama High ===
==== Tōhōshinki ====
The four leaders of the delinquent forces in Ishiyama High. Tōhōshinki (東邦神姫) is an acronym of their respective last names: Hidetora Tojo (東条 英虎, Tōjō Hidetora), Aoi Kunieda (邦枝 葵, Kunieda Aoi), Hajime Kanzaki (神崎 一, Kanzaki Hajime), and Tatsuya Himekawa (姫川 竜也, Himekawa Tatsuya). (Note: The English-subtitled version of the anime by Crunchyroll uses the abbreviation TKKH (using the first letters of their surnames).) Although they were initially introduced as antagonists early in the series, the four later became Tatsumi's most loyal followers. Each gained a King's Emblem, located on a different part of their body, which allows them to tap into Beelzebub's demon powers during fights. This enables them to go toe-to-toe with other demon contract holders.

Hajime Kanzaki (神崎 一, Kanzaki Hajime)
Voiced by: Tomokazu Sugita
The first of the four to be introduced, he was the closest to dominating the school at the time. A sadistic and malignant third year, he was sought out by Tatsumi to be a replacement father for Beel, Tatsumi hoping Kanzaki's purportedly sinister and malicious character would be more appealing to the demon baby than his own. However, after Kanzaki viciously humiliates Shiroyama, his most loyal underling and until then his right-hand man, Tatsumi becomes enraged and punches Kanzaki through a top-story window, sending him to the hospital and further solidifying Beel's attachment to him. After that, Kanzaki loses his retinue, save for Shiroyama and Natsume. He later consorted with Himekawa and Tatsumi in order to pull down the powerful Tojo, but gets caught up with Himekawa in a fight against Tojo's underlings and is sent to the hospital again due to injuries contracted in the explosion that destroyed the school.
Takeshi Shiroyama (城山武, Shiroyama Takeshi)
Voiced by: Kenji Nomura
Takeshi is a strong and tall third-year student. He is easily defeated by Tatsumi with a single shot to the chin. Even after his humiliation by Kanzaki and the dissolution of the latter's gang, he remains attached to Kanzaki. Later, when he is sent to the hospital by St. Ishiyama students, Kanzaki visits upon him. He escapes the hospital to support Ishiyama against the Horsemen in the volleyball match, but is taken back by the staff. He is often seen acting as Kanzaki's voice of reason.
Shintarou Natsume (夏目 慎太郎, Natsume Shintarō)
Voiced by: Daisuke Kishio
Shintarou is a soft-spoken third-year student and an underling of Kanzaki, he shows exceptional interest in Tatsumi and his exploits. Handsome and long-haired, he prefers to make lighthearted quips during frays to engaging in them personally.
Tatsuya Himekawa (姫川 竜也, Himekawa Tatsuya)
Voiced by: Seirō Ogino
Tatsuya is the son of the "Himekawa Group", a financial zaibatsu, a third-year student, and the second member of the Tohoshinki. Using money to solve his problems, he bribes friends and enemies into his employment, often turning the tables on dissident challengers by co-opting their own friends against them. This tactic proved completely useless on Tatsumi, and Himekawa was the first victim of the Zebub Blast. Following his recovery, he groups himself together with Tatsumi and Kanzaki in order to remove Tojo from power, but is caught up in the explosion with Kanzaki and most of the student body. Despite being a capable fighter, Himekawa uses underhanded tactics to prevail, such as having his opponents break their fists by punching a ceramic tile shield hidden under his shirt, or electrocuting them with a shock-baton (both are shown to be useless against Tatsumi).
Aoi Kunieda (邦枝 葵, Kunieda Aoi)
Voiced by: Aki Toyosaki
Aoi is a 17-year-old second-year student and the third leader of Red Tails. She is first introduced in disguise at the park taking care of her baby brother, Kouta, who is constantly mistaken as being Aoi's own child by the mothers at the park. Aoi is the daughter of a local shrine keeper. Her nickname is "Queen" because she protects the girls at Ishiyama High from the men's "grubby hands". Because of Tatsumi's dense personality, he has yet to realize that the girl he befriended at the park that Tatsumi knows as "Aoi Kunie" and Kunieda are one and the same. Despite her tough personality, she has a rather girly crush on Tatsumi but refuses to admit this fact to others. She can feel Saotome using his demon power, which shows she has notable strength for a human.
Chiaki Tanimura (谷村 千秋, Tanimura Chiaki)
Voiced by: Aoi Yūki
Chiaki is a first year student who leads Red Tails. She rarely speaks and dispatches her enemies swiftly with a pair of modified air-guns hidden under her skirt (actually, she can use up to four guns at the same time). She is very loyal to Kunieda even after she leaves the gang, and is ready to shoot anyone other than Tatsumi who makes advances on her. Unlike Nene, she is the first to recognize that Kunieda is in love with Tatsumi, and she thinks it is very cute. She is an expert video game player, often playing with her little brother, and Kanzaki gives her the nickname "Akichi" (an inversion of the syllables of her name) to signify her gaming persona.
Nene Oomori (大森 寧々, Oomori Nene)
Voiced by: Ayahi Takagaki
Originally Aoi's second-in-command, Nene is far more aggressive than her permissive leader. Although she often openly disagrees with and occasionally disobeys Kunieda, she is still her faithful wingman, balking vociferously when Kunieda opts to leave the Red Tails and relinquish the mantle of leadership to her. She takes it nevertheless and soon proves to be worthy of it, gaining the confidence and trust of the Red Tails as their fourth leader. Her weapon of preference are chains, which she uses proficiently to gain an advantage against stronger men. As Kunieda, she is a second-year student.
Yuka Hanazawa (花澤由加, Hanazawa Yuka)
Voiced by: Haruka Tomatsu
Yuka is a first-year student and a talkative member of the Red Tails who often makes embarrassing statements. She has long hair that is always adorned with a flower-shaped hairpin that can be used as a dagger. As a member of the Red Tails, she is a very good fighter and is not afraid of facing men. Lately, she and Kanzaki have been getting along, beginning when both witnessed Tojo's fight with a demon.
Hidetora Tojo (東条 英虎, Tōjō Hidetora)
Voiced by: Tomokazu Seki
Tojo is a third-year student with an unexpected soft side towards smaller creatures and babies, but they do not feel similarly towards him. He is mostly bored with weaklings and is always looking for a good fight, which subsequently leads to his interest towards Tatsumi. He works multiple jobs and sometimes has to miss school because of them. He can feel Saotome using his demon power, which shows he has notable strength for a human. His fighting style is a rigid brutal force. He appears to possess an incredible amount of stamina, as he was able to take a full blow from Miki without so much as flinching. Tojo presents an immediate threat to anyone he faces and has shown a strong willingness to fight, even at the expense of his own body. He is also called by the nickname Tora by his friends.
Kaoru Jinno (陣野 かおる, Jinno Kaoru)
Voiced by: Kentaro Tone
Kaoru is a long-haired, third-year underling of Tojo's. He has a calm attitude and is shown to be bookish, but is nevertheless a strong fighter, being able to defeat Himekawa and Kanzaki on his own easily.
Shoji Aizawa (相沢 庄次, Aizawa Shōji)
Voiced by: Akimitsu Takase
Tojo's right-hand man and a third-year student. He wears sunglasses and has a cool attitude, and is a strong fighter. He has been able to evade one of Tatsumi's attacks and even fight him briefly, although Tatsumi had been taken by surprise. He and Kaoru are caught in the destruction of Ishiyama High and later share a hospital room with Kanzaki, Shiroyama and Himekawa.

=== Killer Six Elements ===
The Killer Six Elements (殺六縁起, Satsuriku Engi) are six first-years who make their appearance at Ishiyama when it is finally rebuilt. Each one leads their own gang. During the period when the students were scattered among different schools, they seem to have grown strong and confident enough to challenge Tatsumi and the Tōhōshinki for the leadership of the school. They are divided in two tiers: the Three Kings and, above them, the Three Beasts.

==== The Three Kings ====
Kankurō Akahoshi (赤星 貫九郎, Akahoshi Kankurō)
The former leader of Hiaburi High School, his battle name is "Fan that dyes everything blood red", and his coat has the picture of a fan on its backside. Other than the hairstyle, he resembles Tatsumi quite closely in physical appearance. Despite being the lowest-ranked of the Elements, he is quite proud and confident, and has declared that he will beat Tatsumi fair and square to take his place as king of the school. His number two is Ryō Haizawa, a third year; and his number three is Shigeru Shigemori, a second-year. He is the contractor of one of the Seven Deadly Sins, Mammon.
Ringo Hōjō (鳳珹 林檎, Hōjō Ringo)
The only woman in the group. She was a former Red Tail under Aoi's leadership, but now has formed her own group at Majōgari Academy, calling themselves the New World Red Tails. Her class and year are still unclear: she is described as a first year, but also as the second leader of the Red Tails before Kunieda. In their first clash with Aoi, the latter refused to fight back against former comrades and suffered minor injuries. Hōjō is nicknamed "Tabako", since she is often smoking. Her numbers two and three are third-years Maaya Ajari and Yukino Kagemiya, respectively.
Ebian Ichikawa (市川 蝦庵, Ichikawa Ebian)
Formerly the head of Sabatou High, and known as "Blind Swordsman" due to a scar that keeps his left eye permanently shut, he is a bulky, bald man who is constantly scowling and who sports a moustache. He wears a dark suit with a scarf and carries a flower on his mouth, resulting in a slightly outlandish appearance. He is described as temperamental and describes Beel as "cute" on first seeing him. His weapon of choice is a sword and, like Aoi, he can cut through concrete with it. His numbers two and three are third-years Souken Chabou and Tetsuhito Kajiura, respectively.

==== Three Beasts ====
Yōhei Nasu (奈須 洋平, Nasu Yōhei)
The former head of Sourei High, nicknamed Nasubi (なすび) or Nasu (茄子; lit. 'Eggplant'). He is a tall, blond man of disheveled appearance who condescends to opponents, even calling Tatsumi "Lil' Oga". He withstands Tatsumi's wall-burying punch and easily breaks free. He and his gang form the musical group The Poltergeists: Misao Onizuka (鬼束みさお, Onizuka Misao), a tall third-year who formerly fought Tojo and served as the "ki" in the Tōhōshinki before Himekawa, plays piano; Teruomi Hino (日野照臣, Hino Teruomi), a masked second-year, plays trumpet; Seiji Kamayama (亀山 誠治, Kameyama Seiji), a dark-haired second-year, plays bass; and Taizō Shiori (塩入泰造, Shioiri Taizō), an obese third-year, plays drums. Nasu tells Tatsumi he will steal Beel and shows great interest in the baby. Like Saotome, Nasu is an advanced Spellmaster. Tatsumi and Beel defeat him, while Kanzaki beats his henchmen. He is the third Beast.
Shinobu Takamiya (鷹宮 忍, Takamiya Shinobu)
The former leader of Daten High and the second Beast, he is the contractor of Lucifer. He led a gang called Fallen Angels.
Fuji (藤)
He is the first Beast and one of the original Killer Six Elements of Ishiyama. He formerly learned spells from Saotome, which makes him senior to Tatsumi. He eventually makes a contract with Satan, one of the Seven Deadly Sins, and uses the obtained power to petrify the people around Tatsumi. He fuses with Satan in the final battle against Tatsumi and Beel, ultimately being defeated by them.

==== Others ====
MK5
A gang suspended from school who is famous for its immense cruelty and poor hygiene. The group's name stands for "Majide Kūkiyomenai 5-ningumi" (マジで空気読めない5人組; lit. 'A Group of Five Who Seriously Cannot Read the Room'). They always wear neckties and make a point of appearing in a choreographed fashion, which often has comical effects. Despite this, they are weak in comparison to other thugs and are almost always quickly defeated. They are different from most other thugs in that they use firearms loaded with real bullets. The member ares: Ikari (碇), the acting leader, short and snarky with black hair; Shimamura (嶋村), marked by a heart-shaped tattoo on his face and uses a pistol; Chatō (茶藤), bald and scarred, and wields nunchuks; Nakata (中田), who wears a hat and glasses and carries a rifle; and Bū (武宇), who possesses an immense, muscular physique and long hair.
Shimokawa (下川)
Voiced by: Hidenori Takahashi
Known as "Good Night Shimokawa" (グッドナイト下川, Guddo Naito Shimokawa), he is a second-year thug who has a crush on Kunieda and is one of the first to be defeated by Tatsumi. His nickname derives from his constant use of "Good night" to address people.

=== Saint Ishiyama Academy ===
Tatsumi and his friends are transferred to Saint Ishiyama Academy, the sister school of Ishiyama High, when the latter is destroyed. The school is unwilling to adopt the delinquents, and the group is constantly harassed by its students. The school also has a force that upholds its rules of conduct: the Six Knights (六騎聖, Rokkisei), six captains of different sports teams and clubs with extraordinary strength and fighting experience. They set out to get rid of Tatsumi and his friends, backed by an unfair rule allowing them to carry out "judgement" on any person or party within the student body. After a huge fight on the rooftops of Saint Ishiyama, the Six Knights challenge Tatsumi and his friends to a sports competition. If Tatsumi and his friends win, they are not expelled. Himekawa also clinches a deal with the teacher in charge of student life, whereby the Six Knights are stripped of their authority and privileges if they lose. Ishiyama ultimately wins.

==== Six Holy Knights ====
Hisaya Miki (三木 久也, Miki Hisaya)
Voiced by: Nobuhiko Okamoto
The only first-year student at Saint Ishiyama to join the Six Knights. He captains the karate team and practices Hakkyokuken and Izuma-style martial arts. He knows Tatsumi from middle school, when Tatsumi saves him from delinquents. At Saint Ishiyama, Miki resents Tatsumi and seeks to prove his strength. After Kiriya Reiji scars Miki, Tatsumi intervenes, then later beats and humiliates Miki in front of Kiriya's gang to divert retaliation, as both move to Nara. Miki resents him until Kiriya reveals the truth three years later. The two then reconcile and fight Kiriya together. Miki relies on agility, and his Black Owl Killer can take down Tatsumi in one hit, though Tatsumi deliberately takes the blow. Miki trains with Izuma for a coming confrontation with the 34th Pillar Squad.
Kaname Izuma (出馬 要, Izuma Kaname)
Voiced by: Kenji Fukuda
The leader of the Six Knights, Miki's teacher, master of the Izuma dojo, and the ex-student council. He is a third-year and the strongest among them. He is a descendant of a demon who escaped to the human world, and was taken in by Saint Ishiyama's headmaster after losing his place in society for revealing his powers. He can therefore release a dark aura like full demons, though at lower levels. He oscillates between calm control and a thirst for death, holds authority among students and faculty, and initiates a volleyball match challenge against Ishiyama students, using martial style techniques before being defeated by Kunieda. When Tatsumi uses the Zebub Blast against Kiriya, he recognizes demonic powers and arranges a cover-up. The headmaster later reveals that Tatsumi may be a target for demons. He can feel Saotome using demon power, indicating notable strength for a human, and is implied to have feelings for Shizuka. His fighting ability is superior to the other Knights and on par with Tojo's and Tatsumi's, but he is taken down with ease by a demon and saved by Tojo's intervention, after which he sets out to train.
Ichiro "Alex Rodriguez" Shinjo (新庄・アレックス・ロドリゲス・一, Shinjo Arekkusu Rodorigesu Ichiro)
Voiced by: Daisuke Hirakawa
A second-year at Saint Ishiyama High with light wavy hair. He captains the boxing club and is regarded as the nation's second-best high school boxer, known for one-hit knockouts. He also plays the piano and later replaces Kaname Izuma as student council president. He initially shows contempt for Ishiyama's students and seeks a confrontation with Tatsumi. Knowing that fighting back means expulsion, Tatsumi takes Alex's punches while testing him with trivia questions to show baby Beel that he is both strong and clever. Alex easily defeats the MK5 but is no match for Tatsumi, who evades his punches, stops one with his hand, and finally deals him a one-hit knockout.
Mitsuteru Sakaki (榊 光輝, Sakaki Mitsuteru)
Voiced by: Keiichi Nakagawa
Sakaki is a second-year like Shinjou. He has long black hair that is usually kept in a ponytail. He is usually seen in his standard Ishiyama uniform and is the least talkative of the knights. He is the captain of the kendo team. He is a very skilled swordsman and is able to cut a few hairs of Kunieda's with a wooden sword. However, he is not in her league: Kunieda is able to cut his sword with a ruler, to Sakaki's shock. He then begins to believe her the strongest of the Ishiyama students and longs to have a rematch with her. He even goes to the length of attacking her when she is unarmed and unwilling to fight back, but is stopped by Himekawa. The two men then fight and seem reasonably well matched, with Himekawa coming out in a slightly worse condition. Later, Sakaki begins to show some attraction to Kunieda.
Hiromichi Gou (郷 宏道, Gō Hiromichi)
Voiced by: Shinya Takahashi
Go is a muscular third-year. He is the captain of the radio club and participates in international ARDF competitions. He is ruthless and actively seeks fights, and attacked out of impulse once Miki admitted that Tatsumi was the strongest of the four who showed up for the rooftop fights. His advance was intercepted by Shintarou Natsume and the two had a reasonably matched fight.
Shizuka Nanami (七海 静, Nanami Shizuka)
Voiced by: Haruna Ikezawa
A red-haired third-year, the only female member of the Six Knights, captain of the archery team, and the ex-student council vice-president. She shares a close rapport with Izuma, joking and laughing with him in a way the other knights cannot, and is seen massaging his back after volleyball training. She knows Tojo from the past, calls him Tora, and both wish to meet Saotome Zenjuurou. Her fighting skill is undetermined, but Kunieda was surprised she could reach the rooftop undetected, and she joined the others against Teimou. She can feel Saotome using demonic powers, indicating notable strength for a human. She has three siblings, two boys and a girl, the eldest of whom looks up to Tojo. She is implied to have feelings for him, but is content being his friend.

==== Others ====
Kazuya Yamamura (山村 和也, Yamamura Kazuya)
Voiced by: Shintaro Asanuma
A first year student who looks up to thugs and gangs and wants to become a delinquent himself. He deeply admires Tatsumi as the best hoodlum around and their first contact is when Tatsumi and Kunieda save him and his friend Azusa from harassment by Teimou students. He then kowtows to Tatsumi and begs to become his underling. After some insistence and flattery, Tatsumi ends up accepting his company. He also admires Furuichi, to the latter's delight, calling him "General Furuichi", for being the only man able to follow Tatsumi. He is a source of information on the Six Knights.
Azusa Fujisaki (藤崎 梓, Fujisaki Azusa)
Voiced by: Yōko Hikasa
Yamamura's girlfriend and classmate and an easy-going, lighthearted girl who quickly gets on good terms with Kunieda and Tatsumi, even rooting for them in their fight against the Six Knights.
Zenjūrō Saotome (早乙女 禅十郎, Saotome Zenjūrō)
Voiced by: Shinshū Fuji
A rugged man with a bandana and stubble assigned to Tatsumi's class. He made a contract with a demon while still a student there. By striking a contract with the demon on equal or more favorable terms, he became a Spellmaster who commands it. He teaches Tatsumi to use Beel's powers and acts on Genma Isurugi's orders. He is also the mentor of Fuji and Takamiya.
Genma Isurugi (石動 源磨, Isurugi Genma)
Voiced by: Takuya Sato
St. Ishiyama's Headmaster. An old man who knows of the demon world and, like Saotome, has access to information from there. He also offers protection to young people who are trying to cope with their demon powers by accepting them into his school. It is implied that Izuma is not the only descendant of demons enrolled at St. Ishiyama. He can feel demonic energy like Saotome and realises immediately when members of the 34th Pillar Squad arrive in the city. When fighting, his muscles expand quickly and he can launch very powerful strikes.
Takumi Sadohara (佐渡原 巧, Sadohara Takumi)
Voiced by: Hiroto Kazuki
The first homeroom teacher of the Ishiyama class at St. Ishiyama prior to Saotome's arrival. Bespectacled, and at first overconfident on his ability to exert control over the thugs, he quickly fails to do so, when his attempts to intimidate them by means of authority, strength or coercion backfire badly. He later becomes attached to the group and supports them in the volleyball match, and is greatly disappointed to be replaced by Saotome.
Kido (木戸)
Voiced by: Takuya Satō
A teacher in charge of student life, he sustains an impassive expression when dealing with pupils and tries to enforce his authority over Ishiyama students, first by threatening to expel Kunieda and Tatsumi if they do not restrain their colleagues; later, by deciding on the expulsion of Tatsumi, all the Touhoushinki, Furuichi and Natsume. However, he is outmaneuvered by Himekawa and ends up agreeing to the condition of removing the Horsemen's authority in case Ishiyama win the volleyball match, which they do. During Kiriya and Teimou's plot, he keeps his cool and even threatens expulsion in case either of the opposing sides resorts to violence.

=== Demon World ===
The Demon World (魔界, Makai) is a realm in another dimension inhabited by many fantastic creatures and ruled by the royal dynasty of the Beelzebubs. Its way of life resembles the Middle Ages, yet contemporary devices such as video games are known, though its technology lags slightly behind that of the human world, as evidenced by Lord En's shock at the advanced nature of a PlayStation 2. The Beelzebubs' power is not uncontested, as there are rogues, thieves, and others living outside the royal family's authority. Demons intend to destroy humans, but they are not immortal. They can be killed in ways similar to humans, though they are more powerful. They can take many forms, but those that interact with Tatsumi and other humans tend to be human-like with minor anatomical differences, such as reptilian ears, fangs, or spots on the skin.

The Great Demon Lord (大魔王, Daima Ō)
Voiced by: Hiroki Takahashi
The Devil King and Baby Beel's father. He is a tall figure with long light-colored hair, wearing a helmet with two prominent, cartoonish horns and dressed in a long cape, who is always pictured from behind. His main characteristic, often alluded to in the course of the series, is being "extremely random". He spends his time mostly playing karaoke or video games, and has twice decided to destroy mankind out of pure whim: however, his schedule full of ceremonies and engagements prevents him from going on his own, and thus he whimsically decides to send his children: first Baby Beel, then Lord En.
Lord En (焔王, En Ō; lit. 'Flame King')
Voiced by: Sayaka Kinoshita
The eldest son of the Great Demon Lord and the older brother of Beel. His real name is unknown. He is a spoiled child who is always accompanied by three demon maids. He is obsessed with games from the human world. He is older than Beel, but he acts just as childishly. It is said that when he cries, his magical power turns the entire surrounding area into a sea of fire. He has feelings for Lamia and publicly refers to her as "my bride".
Forkas Rachmaninoff (フォルカス・ラフマニノフ, Forukasu Rafumaninofu)
Voiced by: Akio Kato
A former imperial doctor to the royal family. He has the appearance of a tall, dark-haired man, but in the human world he takes up a provisional body due to his contempt of humans. This body is similar to one of Lamia's "muumuu" pets, a random mass with a pair of eyes that can float above the ground at times. He is able to read minds. A highly skilled physician, he is first brought by Hilda in order to diagnose baby Beel, and is able to devise a cure for the kid by reestablishing his bond to Tatsumi. He comes back later to treat Hilda's wound. Foras and Saotome know each other, but the nature of the acquaintance, as Saotome's connection to the demon world, is unknown. It is later revealed that Forcas's current position is as the doctor for the 34th Pillar Squad.
Lamia (ラミア, Ramia)
Voiced by: Kaori Fukuhara
A demon doctor who is very small. Lamia comes to the human world in her capacity as Dr. Rachmaninorr's assistant to help in treating baby Beel and later takes care of Tatsumi's wounds after a confrontation with a demon. Like her boss, she can read minds, even baby Beel's, although she does not do it very often. She disapproves of Tatsumi as Beel's parent, but reluctantly accepts it after his battle with Tojo. Although she seemed cold and hostile upon their first encounter, she thanks Tatsumi for saving her after the incident in the demon world. She is very protective of Baby Beel and greatly respects Hilda, whom she refers to as "Hilda-nee-san." Her name is possibly an allusion to the mythological demon. Later in the series, she seeks Furuichi's help to find Lord En on Hilda's request. Lamia carries a pistol loaded with bullets containing demonic concoctions that can erase memories, force a person to do the player's bidding or—in Tatsumi's case—trap him in a psychic loop. She is always accompanied by two small muumuu pets, one of which sits atop her head and often mimics her mood. Her age is unspecified, but her appearance is that of a preteen girl. Her mother is general Laymia of the 34th Pillar Squad.
Angelica (アンジェリカ, Anjerika)
Voiced by: Haruka Tomatsu
Alaindelon's daughter. Like her father, she is a transdimensional demon. A naturalist, she is stationed in the outskirts of Vlad's Haunt to study its ecosystem. She seems to be a bit foolish and absent-minded.

== Media ==
=== Manga ===
Written and illustrated by Ryuhei Tamura, Beelzebub was first published as one-shot pilot chapter in Shueisha's shōnen manga magazine Weekly Shōnen Jump on August 11, 2008, subsequently winning the fourth Gold Future Cup. It was later serialized for five years in the same magazine from February 23, 2009, to February 24, 2014. A spin-off series, Beelzebub: Bangai-hen (べるぜバブ 番外編, Beruzebabu: Bangai-hen; lit. 'Beelzebub: Extra Edition'), ran in Jump Next! from May 7, 2014, to March 13, 2015. Shueisha collected the series's overall 246 chapters in 28 tankōbon volumes, released from July 2, 2009, to May 1, 2015.

=== Anime ===
An original video animation (OVA), produced by Pierrot+, was screened during the Jump Super Anime Tour between October 23 and November 21, 2010; it was later included in the special edition of the ninth volume of the manga, released in December of the same year. A 60-episode anime television series adaptation, also produced by Pierrot+, was broadcast from January 9, 2011, to March 25, 2012, on Yomiuri TV and other NNS stations.

Crunchyroll simulcasted the series in North America and Europe two hours after airing. However, some episodes were postponed and rescheduled following the 2011 Tōhoku earthquake and tsunami. The anime aired with English subtitles on Animax Asia in Southeast Asia, although it is edited to cover Baby Beel's nudity with a diaper. Discotek Media licensed the series for home video release in North America in 2015. Muse Communication licensed the series in Asia-Pacific and streamed it on its Muse Asia YouTube channel.
