= Ryuhei Tamura =

Japanese manga artist

Ryūhei Tamura
- 田村 隆平
- Born: April 18, 1980 (age 46); Gifu Prefecture, Japan
- Occupation: Manga artist

Ryūhei Tamura (Japanese: 田村 隆平, Hepburn: Tamura Ryūhei; born April 19, 1980) is a Japanese manga artist. He is best known for being the author and illustrator of the manga Beelzebub, which was first published as a one-shot in Weekly Shōnen Jump, 2008. It was then serialized in 2009. Tamura was formerly an assistant/student to Toshiaki Iwashiro, the author of Psyren, which was also serialized in Weekly Shōnen Jump.

== Works ==
=== One-shots ===
- Ura Beat (2003, Weekly Shōnen Jump)
- Tiger Dragon Brother (2015, Weekly Shōnen Jump)
- Rappa Rendan (2019, Weekly Shōnen Jump)

=== Series ===
- Beelzebub (2009–2014, Weekly Shōnen Jump)
- Beelzebub Bangai Hen (2015, Weekly Shōnen Jump)
- Hungry Marie (2017, Weekly Shōnen Jump, U.S. edition of Weekly Shonen Jump, via Jump Start)
- Hard-Boiled Cop and Dolphin (2020–2021, Weekly Shōnen Jump, Viz Media Shonen Jump)
- Sebek-chan wants to bite (2023–present, Bentame Jump)
- Cosmos (2023–present, Monthly Sunday Gene-X)
