= December 29 =

December 29 this year in various calendars
- Tuesday, 29 December 2026
Akan	Kwabene
Armenian	12 Arach 1476
Aztec	Huei Tozoztli 8, 3 Cipactli
Babylonian	19 Kislimu, 2337 SE
Balinese pawukon	Luang, Pepet, Beteng, Jaya, Keliwon, Was, Anggara of Julungwangi, Guru, Jangur, Pati
Bengali	14 Poush, BS 1433
Chinese	Yin Fire Ox・Turtle Beak Mansion; Fire Horse Year, Month 11, Day 21 (Dongzhi, 7 days until Xiaohan)
Common Era	29 December 2026 CE
Coptic	20 Koiak, AM 1743
Egyptian	17 Pachon, 2775 NE
Ethiopian	20 Tākḫśāś, 2019 Amätä Məhrät
French Republican	Décade I, Octidi de Nivôse de l'Année 235 de la République
Gregorian	29 December, AD 2026
Hebrew	19 Tevet, AM 5787
Hindu	Pūrvaphalgunī・Ayuṣmān; Solar: 14 Pauṣa, 1948 SE; Lunisolar: Ṣaṣṭhī, Kṛishna pakṣa of Mārgaśīrṣa, 2083 VE; Rāudra・5127 KY・1,872,938
Icelandic	Þriðjudagur, 7 Mörsugur 2026
Islamic	19 Rajab, AH 1448 (using tabular method)
ISO week date	2026-W53-2
Japanese	21 Shimotsuki, Reiwa 8 (Tōji, 7 days until Shōkan)
Julian	16 December, AD 2026 (AM 7535)
Julian day	2461404
Korean	21 Jwidal, 4359 DE
Maya	13.0.14.4.1; 14 Kankin, 3 Imix
Roman	ante diem XVII Kalendas Ianuarias, MMDCCLXXX AUC
Solar Hijri	8 Dey, SH 1405
Tibetan	21 mgo, me pho rta 2153 or 1772 or 1000

<<	December					>>
Su	Mo	Tu	We	Th	Fr	Sa
		1	2	3	4	5
6	7	8	9	10	11	12
13	14	15	16	17	18	19
20	21	22	23	24	25	26
27	28	29	30	31
2026

December 29 in recent years
2025 (Monday)
2024 (Sunday)
2023 (Friday)
2022 (Thursday)
2021 (Wednesday)
2020 (Tuesday)
2019 (Sunday)
2018 (Saturday)
2017 (Friday)
2016 (Thursday)

December 29 is the 363rd day of the year (364th in leap years) in the Gregorian calendar; two days remain until the end of the year.

== Events ==
=== Pre-1600 ===
- 1170 – Thomas Becket, Archbishop of Canterbury, is assassinated inside Canterbury Cathedral by followers of King Henry II; he subsequently becomes a saint and martyr in the Anglican Communion and the Catholic Church.
- 1503 – The Battle of Garigliano was fought between a Spanish army under Gonzalo Fernández de Córdoba and a French army commanded by Ludovico II, Marquess of Saluzzo.

=== 1601–1900 ===
- 1607 – According to John Smith, Pocahontas, daughter of Powhatan leader Wahunsenacawh, successfully pleads for his life after tribal leaders attempt to execute him.
- 1778 – American Revolutionary War: British forces under the command of Lieutenant Colonel Archibald Campbell defeat American forces under Major General Robert Howe and capture the port city of Savannah, Georgia.
- 1812 – USS Constitution, under the command of Captain William Bainbridge, captures HMS Java off the coast of Brazil after a three-hour battle.
- 1835 – The Treaty of New Echota is signed, ceding all the lands of the Cherokee east of the Mississippi River to the United States.
- 1845 – The United States annexes the Republic of Texas and admits it as the 28th state.
- 1860 – The launch of HMS Warrior, with her combination of screw propeller, iron hull and iron armour, renders all previous warships obsolete.
- 1862 – American Civil War: The Battle of Chickasaw Bayou ends in a Union defeat as forces under General William T. Sherman are repulsed with heavy losses by Confederate troops under General John C. Pemberton.
- 1874 – The military coup of Gen. Martinez Campos in Sagunto ends the failed First Spanish Republic and the monarchy is restored as Prince Alfonso is proclaimed King of Spain.
- 1876 – The Ashtabula River railroad disaster occurs, leaving 64 injured and 92 dead at Ashtabula, Ohio.
- 1890 – Wounded Knee Massacre: On Pine Ridge Indian Reservation, 300 Lakota are killed by the United States 7th Cavalry Regiment.

=== 1901–present ===
- 1911 – Mongolia gains independence from the Qing dynasty, enthroning 8th Jebtsundamba Khutughtu as Khagan of Mongolia.
- 1913 – Cecil B. DeMille starts filming Hollywood's first feature film, The Squaw Man.
- 1930 – Sir Muhammad Iqbal's presidential address in Allahabad introduces the two-nation theory and outlines a vision for the creation of Pakistan.
- 1934 – Japan renounces the Washington Naval Treaty of 1922 and the London Naval Treaty of 1930.
- 1937 – The Irish Free State is replaced by a new state called Ireland with the adoption of a new constitution.
- 1940 – World War II: in the Second Great Fire of London, the Luftwaffe fire-bombs London, England, killing almost 200 civilians.
- 1972 – Eastern Air Lines Flight 401 (a Lockheed L-1011 TriStar) crashes in the Florida Everglades on approach to Miami International Airport, Florida, killing 101 of the 176 people on board.
- 1975 – A bomb explodes at LaGuardia Airport in New York City, killing 11 people and injuring more than 75.
- 1989 – Czech writer, philosopher and dissident Václav Havel is elected the first post-communist President of Czechoslovakia.
- 1989 – The Nikkei 225 for the Tokyo Stock Exchange hits its all-time intra-day high of 38,957.44 and closing high at 38,915.87, serving as the apex of the Japanese asset price bubble.
- 1992 – Fernando Collor de Mello, president of Brazil, tries to resign amidst corruption charges, but is then impeached.
- 1994 – Turkish Airlines Flight 278 (a Boeing 737-400) crashes on approach to Van Ferit Melen Airport in Van, Turkey, killing 57 of the 76 people on board.
- 1996 – Guatemala and leaders of Guatemalan National Revolutionary Unity sign a peace accord ending a 36-year civil war.
- 1998 – Leaders of the Khmer Rouge apologize for the Cambodian genocide that claimed over one million lives.
- 2003 – The last known speaker of Akkala Sami dies, rendering the language extinct.
- 2006 – The UK settles its Anglo-American loan, post-WWII loan debt.
- 2012 – A Tupolev Tu-204 airliner crashes in a ditch between the airport fence and the M3 highway after overshooting a runway at Vnukovo International Airport in Moscow, Russia, killing five people and leaving three others critically injured.
- 2013 – A suicide bomb attack at the Volgograd-1 railway station in the southern Russian city of Volgograd kills at least 18 people and wounds 40 others.
- 2013 – Seven-time Formula One champion Michael Schumacher suffers a massive head injury while skiing in the French Alps.
- 2020 – A magnitude 6.4 earthquake hits near the town of Petrinja in Sisak-Moslavina County, Croatia, killing seven people.
- 2023 – South Africa files a genocide case against Israel at the International Court of Justice over Israeli conducts in the Gaza Strip.
- 2024 – Jeju Air Flight 2216 crashes into a wall in Muan, South Korea, killing 179 of the 181 occupants. It is the worst aircraft accident on South Korean soil in history.

== Births ==
=== Pre-1600 ===
- 1536 – Henry VI, German nobleman (died 1572)
- 1550 – García de Silva Figueroa, Spanish diplomat and traveller (died 1624)

=== 1601–1900 ===
- 1633 – Johannes Zollikofer, Swiss vicar (died 1692)
- 1709 – Elizabeth Petrovna, Russian empress (died 1762)
- 1721 – Madame de Pompadour, mistress of King Louis XV (died 1764)
- 1746 – Saverio Cassar, Maltese priest and rebel leader (died 1805)
- 1766 – Charles Macintosh, Scottish chemist and the inventor of waterproof fabric (died 1843)
- 1788 – Christian Jürgensen Thomsen, Danish antiquarian (died 1865)
- 1796 – Johann Christian Poggendorff, German physicist and journalist (died 1877)
- 1800 – Charles Goodyear, American chemist and engineer (died 1860)
- 1804 – John Langdon Sibley, American librarian (died 1885)
- 1808 – Andrew Johnson, American general and politician, 17th President of the United States (died 1875)
- 1809 – George Washington Baines, American politician, journalist and educator (died 1882)
- 1809 – William Ewart Gladstone, English lawyer and politician, Prime Minister of the United Kingdom (died 1898)
- 1809 – Albert Pike, American author, poet, orator, editor, lawyer, jurist, and general (died 1891)
- 1811 – Francisco Palau, Catalan Discalced Carmelite friar and priest (died 1872)
- 1816 – Carl Ludwig, German physician and physiologist (died 1895)
- 1843 – Elisabeth of Wied (died 1916)
- 1844 – Womesh Chunder Bonnerjee, Indian barrister and first president of Indian National Congress (died 1906)
- 1855 – August Kitzberg, Estonian author and poet (died 1927)
- 1856 – Thomas Joannes Stieltjes, Dutch-French mathematician and academic (died 1894)
- 1857 – Sydney Young, English chemist (died 1937)
- 1859 – Venustiano Carranza, Mexican soldier and politician, 37th President of Mexico (died 1920)
- 1870 – Earl Gregg Swem, American historian, bibliographer and librarian (died 1965)
- 1874 – François Brandt, Dutch rower and bishop (died 1949)
- 1876 – Pablo Casals, Catalan cellist and conductor (died 1973)
- 1876 – Lionel Tertis, English violist (died 1975)
- 1879 – Billy Mitchell, American general and pilot (died 1936)
- 1881 – Scott Leary, American swimmer (died 1958)
- 1881 – Jess Willard, American boxer (died 1968)
- 1885 – Roman von Ungern-Sternberg, Austrian-Russian general (died 1921)
- 1886 – Norman Hallows, English runner and captain (died 1968)
- 1886 – Georg Hermann Struve, German astronomer (died 1933)
- 1892 – Aku Korhonen, Finnish actor (died 1960)
- 1894 – J. Lister Hill, American politician (died 1984)
- 1895 – Oswald Freisler, German lawyer and author (died 1939)
- 1896 – David Alfaro Siqueiros, Mexican painter (died 1974)
- 1899 – Nie Rongzhen, Chinese general and politician, Mayor of Beijing (died 1992)

=== 1901–present ===
- 1902 – Nels Stewart, Canadian ice hockey player (died 1957)
- 1903 – Candido Portinari, Brazilian painter (died 1962)
- 1904 – Kuvempu, Indian author and poet (died 1994)
- 1908 – Helmut Gollwitzer, German theologian and author (died 1993)
- 1908 – Magnus Pyke, English scientist and author (died 1992)
- 1910 – Ronald Coase, English-American economist, author, and academic, Nobel Prize laureate (died 2013)
- 1911 – Klaus Fuchs, German physicist and spy (died 1988)
- 1914 – Zainul Abedin, Bangladeshi painter and academic (died 1976)
- 1914 – Billy Tipton, American pianist and saxophonist (died 1989)
- 1914 – Albert Tucker, Australian painter and illustrator (died 1999)
- 1915 – Bill Osmanski, American football player and coach (died 1996)
- 1915 – Robert Ruark, American hunter and author (died 1965)
- 1915 – Jo Van Fleet, American actress (died 1996)
- 1917 – Tom Bradley, American lieutenant, lawyer, and politician, 38th Mayor of Los Angeles (died 1998)
- 1917 – Ramanand Sagar, Indian director and producer (died 2005)
- 1919 – Alfred de Grazia, American political scientist and author (died 2014)
- 1919 – Roman Vlad, Italian pianist and composer (died 2013)
- 1920 – Viveca Lindfors, Swedish-American actress, singer and poet (died 1995)
- 1921 – Robert C. Baker, American inventor and professor (died 2006)
- 1921 – Dobrica Ćosić, Serbian politician, 1st President of the Federal Republic of Yugoslavia (died 2014)
- 1921 – Michael Horne, English structural engineer, scientist and academic (died 2000)
- 1922 – Little Joe Cook, American singer-songwriter (died 2014)
- 1922 – William Gaddis, American author and academic (died 1998)
- 1923 – Yvonne Choquet-Bruhat, French mathematician and physicist (died 2025)
- 1923 – Cheikh Anta Diop, Senegalese historian, anthropologist, and physicist (died 1986)
- 1923 – Lily Ebert, Hungarian-born Holocaust survivor (died 2024)
- 1923 – Morton Estrin, American pianist and educator (died 2017)
- 1923 – Dina Merrill, American actress, game show panelist, socialite, heiress, and businesswoman (died 2017)
- 1923 – Shlomo Venezia, Greek-Italian author and Holocaust survivor (died 2012)
- 1924 – Joe Allbritton, American businessman and publisher, founded the Allbritton Communications Company (died 2012)
- 1924 – Kim Song-ae, Korean politician (died 2014)
- 1925 – Pete Dye, American golfer and architect (died 2020)
- 1927 – Andy Stanfield, American sprinter (died 1985)
- 1928 – Bernard Cribbins, British actor (died 2022)
- 1929 – Matt Murphy, American guitarist (died 2018)
- 1931 – Yi Ku, Korean prince (died 2005)
- 1931 – Stasys Stonkus, Lithuanian basketball player and coach (died 2012)
- 1932 – Inga Swenson, American actress and singer (died 2023)
- 1933 – Samuel Brittan, English journalist and author (died 2020)
- 1934 – Ed Flanders, American actor (died 1995)
- 1936 – Mary Tyler Moore, American actress and producer (died 2017)
- 1936 – Ray Nitschke, American football player (died 1998)
- 1937 – Wayne Huizenga, American businessman, founded AutoNation (died 2018)
- 1937 – Barbara Steele, English actress
- 1938 – Harvey Smith, English horse rider and sportscaster
- 1938 – Jon Voight, American actor and producer
- 1939 – Ed Bruce, American country music singer-songwriter (died 2021)
- 1940 – Fred Hansen, American pole vaulter
- 1941 – Ray Thomas, English singer-songwriter and flute player (died 2018)
- 1942 – Dinah Christie, English-Canadian actress and singer
- 1942 – Rajesh Khanna, Indian actor (died 2012)
- 1942 – Dorothy Morkis, American equestrian
- 1942 – Óscar Rodríguez Maradiaga, Honduran cardinal
- 1943 – Bill Aucoin, American talent manager (died 2010)
- 1943 – Molly Bang, American author and illustrator
- 1943 – Rick Danko, Canadian singer-songwriter, bass player, and producer (died 1999)
- 1944 – Andrew Foster, British public servant
- 1944 – Rodney Redmond, New Zealand cricketer
- 1944 – Gerard Windsor, Australian author and literary critic
- 1945 – Birendra of Nepal, King of Nepal from 1972 to 2001 (died 2001)
- 1945 – Keith Milow, British artist
- 1946 – Marianne Faithfull, English singer-songwriter and actress (died 2025)
- 1946 – Laffit Pincay, Jr., Panamanian jockey
- 1946 – Paul Trible, American attorney, politician and academic administrator
- 1946 – Jackie Bezos, American philanthropist (died 2025)
- 1947 – Richard Crandall, American physicist and computer scientist (died 2012)
- 1947 – Ted Danson, American actor and producer
- 1947 – Leonhard Lapin, Estonian architect and poet (died 2022)
- 1947 – Cozy Powell, English drummer, songwriter, and producer (died 1998)
- 1947 – David Tanner, English rower and coach
- 1947 – Vincent Winter, Scottish actor, director, and production manager (died 1998)
- 1948 – Jacky Clark Chisholm, American gospel singer
- 1948 – Peter Robinson, Northern Irish politician, 3rd First Minister of Northern Ireland
- 1949 – Syed Kirmani, Indian cricketer and actor
- 1949 – Ian Livingstone, English fantasy author and entrepreneur
- 1949 – David Topliss, English rugby league player and coach (died 2008)
- 1950 – Jon Polito, American actor (died 2016)
- 1951 – Willem de Blécourt, Dutch historical anthropologist
- 1951 – Yvonne Elliman, American singer-songwriter and actress
- 1951 – Mike deGruy, American documentary filmmaker (died 2012)
- 1951 – Georges Thurston, Canadian singer-songwriter (died 2007)
- 1952 – Gelsey Kirkland, American ballerina and choreographer
- 1953 – Gali Atari, Israeli singer and actress
- 1953 – Thomas Bach, German fencer, lawyer and sports administrator; 9th President of the International Olympic Committee
- 1953 – Alan Rusbridger, Zambian-English journalist and academic
- 1953 – Kate Schmidt, American javelin thrower and coach
- 1953 – Stanley Williams, American gang leader, co-founded the Crips (died 2005)
- 1953 – Charlayne Woodard, American actress and playwright
- 1954 – Albrecht Böttcher, German mathematician
- 1954 – Norihito, Prince Takamado of Japan (died 2002)
- 1954 – Mike Parry, English broadcaster and former journalist
- 1954 – Roger Voudouris, American singer-songwriter and guitarist (died 2003)
- 1955 – Chris Goodall, English businessman and author
- 1955 – Donald D. Hoffman, American quantitative psychologist and author
- 1956 – Zaki Chehab, Lebanese-British journalist
- 1956 – Fred MacAulay, Scottish comedian and radio host
- 1956 – Katy Munger, American writer
- 1957 – Brad Grey, American screenwriter and producer (died 2017)
- 1957 – Oliver Hirschbiegel, German actor, director, and producer
- 1957 – Paul Rudnick, American author, playwright, and screenwriter
- 1958 – Tyrone Benskin, English-Canadian actor, theatre director and politician
- 1958 – Nancy J. Currie-Gregg, American colonel, engineer, and astronaut
- 1959 – Patricia Clarkson, American actress
- 1959 – Keith Crossan, Irish rugby player
- 1959 – Ann Demeulemeester, Belgian fashion designer
- 1959 – Martin Moran, American actor and author
- 1959 – Milton Ottey, Jamaican-Canadian high jumper and coach
- 1959 – Paula Poundstone, American comedian and author
- 1960 – Katerina Didaskalou, Greek actress
- 1960 – Brian A. Hopkins, American author
- 1960 – David Boon, Australian cricketer
- 1960 – Thomas Lubanga Dyilo, Congolese militia leader, founded the Union of Congolese Patriots
- 1960 – David Gilbert, Australian cricketer
- 1960 – Michael James Pappas, American politician
- 1961 – Kevin Granata, American engineer and academic (died 2007)
- 1961 – Richard Horton, English physician and journalist
- 1961 – Jim Reid, Scottish singer-songwriter and guitarist
- 1961 – Iliya Valov, Bulgarian football player (d. 2024)
- 1962 – Leza Lowitz, American author
- 1962 – Carles Puigdemont, Catalan politician and journalist, former president
- 1962 – Wynton Rufer, New Zealand footballer
- 1962 – Devon White, Jamaican-American baseball player
- 1963 – Francisco Bustamante, Filipino billiards player
- 1963 – Des Foy, English rugby player
- 1963 – Ulf Kristersson, Swedish politician, Leader of the Swedish Moderate Party and 35th Prime Minister of Sweden
- 1963 – Dave McKean, English illustrator, photographer, director, and pianist
- 1963 – Sean Payton, American football player and coach
- 1963 – Liisa Savijarvi, Canadian skier
- 1964 – Michael Cudlitz, American actor
- 1964 – Josh Harris, American investor and sports team owner
- 1964 – Shingo Tsurumi, Japanese actor
- 1965 – Dexter Holland, American musician, singer, songwriter, and biologist
- 1965 – John Newton, American actor
- 1965 – Martin Offiah, English rugby league player and sportscaster
- 1966 – Laurent Boudouani, French boxer
- 1966 – Stefano Eranio, Italian footballer and coach
- 1966 – Jason Gould, American actor and singer
- 1966 – Christian Kracht, Swiss author
- 1966 – Jeff Luhnow, American businessman
- 1966 – Danilo Pérez, Panamanian pianist and composer
- 1967 – Ashleigh Banfield, Canadian-American journalist
- 1967 – Chris Barnes, American singer-songwriter and guitarist
- 1967 – Lilly Wachowski, American director, screenwriter and producer
- 1968 – Li Bun-hui, North Korean table tennis player
- 1968 – James Mouton, American baseball player
- 1969 – Jason Cook, English footballer
- 1969 – Jennifer Ehle, American actress
- 1969 – Allan McNish, Scottish race car driver and journalist
- 1969 – José Antonio Noriega, Mexican footballer
- 1969 – Scott Patterson, American financial journalist and author
- 1970 – Enrico Chiesa, Italian footballer and manager
- 1970 – Aled Jones, Welsh singer and television host
- 1970 – Hidetoshi Mitsusada, Japanese race car driver
- 1970 – Glen Phillips, American singer-songwriter and guitarist
- 1970 – Kevin Weisman, American actor
- 1971 – Besnik Hasi, Kosovo Albanian football manager and former player
- 1971 – Mike Pesca, American radio journalist and podcaster
- 1971 – Um Sang-hyun, South Korean voice actor
- 1971 – Margot Thien, American swimmer
- 1972 – Andreas Dackell, Swedish ice hockey player
- 1972 – Jason Kreis, American soccer player and manager
- 1972 – Jude Law, English actor
- 1972 – Leonor Varela, Chilean-American model and actress
- 1973 – Pimp C, American rapper and producer (UGK) (died 2007)
- 1973 – Theo Epstein, American businessman
- 1973 – Jenny Lawson, American journalist and author
- 1974 – Asheru, American rapper and producer
- 1974 – O'Neil Bell, Jamaican boxer (died 2015)
- 1974 – Maria Dizzia, American actress
- 1974 – Twinkle Khanna, Indian actress and writer
- 1974 – Mahal, Filipino actress, comedian and vlogger (died 2021)
- 1974 – Mekhi Phifer, American actor
- 1974 – Richie Sexson, American baseball player and coach
- 1974 – Ryan Shore, Canadian composer and producer
- 1975 – Shawn Hatosy, American actor
- 1975 – Jaret Wright, American baseball player
- 1976 – Kate Ford, English actress
- 1976 – Filip Kuba, Czech ice hockey player
- 1976 – Danny McBride, American actor, producer and screenwriter
- 1977 – Jimmy Journell, American baseball player
- 1977 – Katherine Moennig, American actress
- 1978 – Alexis Amore, Peruvian-American porn actress and director
- 1978 – Jake Berry, English lawyer and politician
- 1978 – Matthew Carr, Australian footballer
- 1978 – Kieron Dyer, English footballer and coach
- 1978 – Danny Higginbotham, English footballer and journalist
- 1978 – Mitsuhiro Ishida, Japanese mixed martial artist
- 1978 – LaToya London, American singer and actress
- 1978 – Angelo Taylor, American hurdler and sprinter
- 1979 – Diego Luna, Mexican actor, director and producer
- 1979 – Yuki Morisaki, Japanese chef and television host
- 1979 – Moe Oshikiri, Japanese model and actress
- 1979 – George Parros, American ice hockey player
- 1979 – Reihan Salam, American political commentator, columnist and author
- 1979 – Ariel Schrag, American cartoonist and screenwriter
- 1981 – Shizuka Arakawa, Japanese figure skater and sportscaster
- 1981 – Janice Lynn Mather, Bahamian-Canadian author
- 1981 – Shaun Suisham, American football player
- 1981 – Anna Woltz, Dutch author
- 1981 – Vjatšeslav Zahovaiko, Estonian footballer
- 1982 – Alison Brie, American actress
- 1982 – Gabrielle Destroismaisons, Canadian singer
- 1982 – Brian Hill, Canadian swimmer
- 1982 – Dale Morris, Australian footballer
- 1982 – Norbert Siedler, Austrian race car driver
- 1982 – Julia Wertz, American cartoonist, writer and urban explorer
- 1983 – Jessica Andrews, American singer and songwriter
- 1983 – James Kelly, Australian footballer
- 1983 – Gonzalo Olave, Chilean actor (died 2009)
- 1983 – Angela Scanlon, Irish television presenter and general television personality
- 1984 – Branden Jacobs-Jenkins, American playwright
- 1984 – Brenton Lawrence, Australian rugby league player
- 1984 – Reimo Tamm, Estonian basketball player
- 1985 – Wang Ji-hye, South Korean actress
- 1985 – Alexa Ray Joel, American singer-songwriter
- 1986 – Joe Anyon, former English footballer
- 1986 – Derek Ryan, American ice hockey player
- 1987 – Iain De Caestecker, Scottish actor
- 1987 – Juliana Huxtable, American artist
- 1987 – Yuhi Sekiguchi, Japanese race car driver
- 1988 – Eric Berry, American football player
- 1988 – Christen Press, American footballer
- 1988 – Ágnes Szávay, Hungarian tennis player
- 1989 – Jane Levy, American actress
- 1989 – Kei Nishikori, Japanese tennis player
- 1989 – Harri Säteri, Finnish ice hockey player
- 1990 – Allen Kim, South Korean singer, dancer, and actor (U-KISS)
- 1991 – Steven Caulker, English footballer
- 1991 – Patrick Feeney, American sprinter
- 1992 – Mislav Oršić, Croatian footballer
- 1992 – Katsuhiro Suzuki, Japanese actor and model
- 1993 – Travis Head, Australian cricketer
- 1993 – Gabby May, Canadian artistic gymnast
- 1994 – Kristel Fulgar, Filipino actress
- 1994 – Princess Kako of Akishino, Japanese princess
- 1995 – Myles Garrett, American football player
- 1995 – Rina Ikoma, Japanese singer and actress (Nogizaka46 and AKB48)
- 1995 – Ross Lynch, American singer and actor
- 1996 – Sana Minatozaki, Japanese singer
- 1996 – Dylan Minnette, American actor, musician and singer
- 1997 – Felix Keisinger, German skeleton racer
- 1998 – Seamus Davey-Fitzpatrick, American actor
- 1998 – Victor Osimhen, Nigerian footballer
- 1998 – Brandon Thomas-Asante, Ghanaian footballer
- 1999 – Andreas Skov Olsen, Danish footballer
- 1999 – Francisco Trincão, Portuguese footballer
- 2000 – Orkun Kökçü, Dutch-Turkish footballer
- 2000 – Julio Rodríguez, Dominican baseball player
- 2000 – Eliot Vassamillet, Belgian singer
- 2005 – Davide Bartesaghi, Italian footballer
- 2006 – Ethan Mbappé, French footballer

== Deaths ==
=== Pre-1600 ===
- 721 – Empress Genmei of Japan (b. 660)
- 1170 – Thomas Becket, English archbishop and saint (born 1118)
- 1208 – Emperor Zhangzong of Jin (born 1168)
- 1380 – Elizabeth of Poland, queen consort of Hungary (born 1305)
- 1550 – Bhuvanaikabahu VII, King of Kotte (born 1468)
- 1563 – Sebastian Castellio, French preacher and theologian (born 1515)

=== 1601–1900 ===
- 1606 – Stephen Bocskai, Prince of Transylvania (born 1557)
- 1634 – John Albert Vasa, Polish cardinal (b. 1612)
- 1661 – Antoine Girard de Saint-Amant, French poet (born 1594)
- 1689 – Thomas Sydenham, English physician and author (born 1624)
- 1720 – Maria Margaretha Kirch, German astronomer and educator (born 1670)
- 1731 – Brook Taylor, English mathematician and theorist (born 1685)
- 1737 – Joseph Saurin, French minister and mathematician (b. 1659)
- 1772 – Ernst Johann von Biron, 7th duke of Courland and Semigallia (born 1690)
- 1785 – Johann Heinrich Rolle, German composer (born 1716)
- 1785 – Johan Herman Wessel, Norwegian-Danish poet and playwright (born 1742)
- 1807 – Diogo de Carvalho e Sampayo, Portuguese diplomat and scientist (born 1750)
- 1815 – Sarah Baartman, Khoikhoi woman (b. 1789)
- 1825 – Jacques-Louis David, French painter and illustrator (born 1748)
- 1834 – Thomas Robert Malthus, English economist (born 1766)
- 1838 – Søren Christian Sommerfelt, Norwegian priest and botanist (born 1794)
- 1887 – Ferdinand Johann Wiedemann, Estonian-Russian linguist and botanist (b. 1805)
- 1890 – Spotted Elk, American tribal leader (born 1826)
- 1890 – Octave Feuillet, French novelist and dramatist (born 1821)
- 1891 – Leopold Kronecker, Polish-German mathematician and academic (born 1823)
- 1894 – Christina Rossetti, English poet and hymn-writer (born 1830)
- 1896 – Jacob ben Moses Bachrach, Polish apologist (born 1824)
- 1897 – William James Linton, English-American painter, author, and activist (born 1812)
- 1898 – Ilia Solomonovich Abelman, Russian astronomer (born 1866)
- 1900 – John Henry Leech, English entomologist (born 1862)

=== 1901–present ===
- 1905 – Charles Yerkes, American financier (born 1837)
- 1910 – Samuel Butcher, Anglo-Irish classical scholar and politician (born 1850)
- 1910 – Reginald Doherty, English tennis player (born 1872)
- 1911 – Rosamund Marriott Watson, English poet, author and critic (born 1860)
- 1915 – Tom Shevlin, collegiate athlete and businessman (born 1883)
- 1918 – Abby Leach, American educator (born 1855)
- 1919 – William Osler, Canadian physician and professor (born 1849)
- 1921 – Hermann Paul, German philologist, linguist and lexicographer (born 1846)
- 1924 – Carl Spitteler, Swiss poet and academic, Nobel Prize laureate (born 1845)
- 1925 – Félix Vallotton, Swiss-French painter (born 1865)
- 1926 – Rainer Maria Rilke, Austrian poet and author (born 1875)
- 1929 – Wilhelm Maybach, German engineer and businessman, founded Maybach (born 1846)
- 1929 – Edward Christopher Williams, American librarian (born 1871)
- 1936 – Willem Siebenhaar, Dutch-Australian activist (born 1863)
- 1937 – Don Marquis, American journalist, author, and playwright (born 1878)
- 1937 – Alma Tell, American actress (born 1898)
- 1939 – Kelly Miller, American mathematician, sociologist, essayist, newspaper columnist and author (born 1863)
- 1939 – Madeleine Pelletier, French psychiatrist, feminist and political activist (born 1874)
- 1940 – Stephen Birch, American businessman (born 1873)
- 1941 – Louis Eilshemius, American painter (born 1864)
- 1941 – Tullio Levi-Civita, Italian mathematician and scholar (born 1873)
- 1943 – Art Young, American cartoonist and writer (born 1866)
- 1944 – Khasan Israilov, Chechen rebel (born 1910)
- 1945 – Beulah Dark Cloud, American actress (born 1887)
- 1946 – Mirko Breyer, Croatian writer, bibliographer, and antiquarian (born 1863)
- 1946 – Camillo Schumann, German composer and organist (born 1872)
- 1948 – Harry Farjeon, British composer and music teacher (born 1878)
- 1949 – Tyler Dennett, American historian and author (born 1883)
- 1952 – Fletcher Henderson, American pianist, composer, and bandleader (born 1897)
- 1952 – Beryl Rubinstein, American pianist, composer and teacher (born 1898)
- 1954 – William Merriam Burton, American chemist (born 1865)
- 1956 – Miles Vandahurst Lynk, American physician and author (born 1871)
- 1958 – Doris Humphrey, American dancer and choreographer (born 1895)
- 1959 – Robin Milford, English soldier and composer (born 1903)
- 1960 – Eden Phillpotts, English author and poet (born 1862)
- 1965 – Frank Nugent, American screenwriter, journalist and film reviewer (born 1908)
- 1965 – Kōsaku Yamada, Japanese composer and conductor (born 1886)
- 1967 – Paul Whiteman, American violinist, composer, and conductor (born 1890)
- 1968 – Austin Farrer, English theologian and philosopher (born 1904)
- 1970 – William King Gregory, American zoologist and anatomist (born 1876)
- 1970 – Marie Menken, American director and painter (born 1909)
- 1971 – John Marshall Harlan II, American lawyer and jurist (born 1899)
- 1972 – Joseph Cornell, American sculptor and director (born 1903)
- 1972 – Chrysostomos Papasarantopoulos, Greek priest and missionary (born 1903)
- 1975 – Euell Gibbons, American author and naturalist (born 1911)
- 1976 – Ivo Van Damme, Belgian runner (born 1954)
- 1979 – F. Edward Hébert, American journalist and politician (born 1901)
- 1979 – Richard Tecwyn Williams, Welsh biochemist (born 1909)
- 1980 – Tim Hardin, American singer-songwriter (born 1941)
- 1980 – Nadezhda Mandelstam, Russian author and educator (born 1899)
- 1980 – Irvin F. Westheimer, American businessman and social reformer (born 1879)
- 1981 – Philip Handler, American nutritionist, and biochemist (born 1917)
- 1981 – Miroslav Krleža, Croatian author, poet, and playwright (born 1893)
- 1984 – Indus Arthur, American actress and singer (born 1941)
- 1984 – P. H. Polk, American photographer (born 1898)
- 1984 – Leo Robin, American composer, lyricist and songwriter (born 1900)
- 1986 – Harold Macmillan, English captain and politician, Prime Minister of the United Kingdom (born 1894)
- 1986 – Andrei Tarkovsky, Russian director and screenwriter (born 1932)
- 1987 – Jun Ishikawa, Japanese author (born 1899)
- 1987 – Wilbert E. Moore, American sociologist (born 1914)
- 1988 – Mike Beuttler, Egyptian race car driver (born 1940)
- 1988 – Ieuan Maddock, Welsh scientist and nuclear researcher (born 1917)
- 1989 – Süreyya Ağaoğlu, Azerbaijani-Turkish lawyer and jurist (born 1903)
- 1992 – Vivienne Segal, American actress and singer (born 1897)
- 1993 – Frunzik Mkrtchyan, Armenian actor (born 1930)
- 1994 – Frank Thring, Australian actor (born 1926)
- 1995 – Lita Grey, American actress (born 1908)
- 1995 – Hans Henkemans, Dutch pianist, composer and psychiatrist (born 1913)
- 1996 – Pennar Davies, Welsh clergyman and author (born 1911)
- 1996 – Mireille Hartuch, French singer-songwriter and actress (born 1906)
- 1996 – Peggy Herbison, Scottish politician (born 1907)
- 1998 – Ralph Siu, American scholar, military and civil servant, and author (born 1917)
- 1998 – Don Taylor, American actor and film director (born 1920)
- 1999 – Leon Radzinowicz, Polish-English criminologist and academic (born 1906)
- 2001 – Takashi Asahina, Japanese conductor (born 1908)
- 2001 – Cássia Eller, Brazilian singer-songwriter and guitarist (born 1962)
- 2001 – György Kepes, Hungarian painter, photographer, designer, educator and art theorist (born 1906)
- 2002 – Lloyd Barbee, American lawyer and politician (born 1925)
- 2002 – Ralph Clanton, American actor (born 1914)
- 2003 – Earl Hindman, American actor (born 1942)
- 2003 – Dinsdale Landen, English actor (born 1932)
- 2003 – Bob Monkhouse, English comedian, actor, and game show host (born 1928)
- 2004 – Julius Axelrod, American biochemist and academic, Nobel Prize laureate (born 1912)
- 2004 – Ken Burkhart, American baseball player and umpire (born 1916)
- 2004 – Peter Davison, American poet, essayist, teacher, lecturer, editor and publisher (born 1928)
- 2004 – Liddy Holloway, New Zealand actress and screenwriter (born 1947)
- 2005 – Gerda Boyesen, Norwegian-English psychotherapist and author (born 1922)
- 2005 – Cyril Philips, British historian and academic director (born 1912)
- 2005 – Basil William Robinson, British art scholar and author (born 1912)
- 2007 – Phil O'Donnell, Scottish footballer (born 1972)
- 2007 – Phil Dusenberry, American advertising executive (born 1936)
- 2007 – Kevin Greening, English radio host (born 1962)
- 2008 – Freddie Hubbard, American trumpet player and composer (born 1938)
- 2008 – Victor H. Krulak, American soldier (born 1913)
- 2009 – Janina Bauman, Polish journalist and writer (born 1926)
- 2009 – David Levine, American artist and illustrator (born 1926)
- 2009 – Steve Williams, American football player and wrestler (born 1960)
- 2010 – Avi Cohen, Israeli footballer and manager (born 1956)
- 2010 – Bill Erwin, American actor and cartoonist (born 1914)
- 2011 – Constance Bartlett Hieatt, American scholar (born 1928)
- 2012 – Mike Auldridge, American singer and guitarist (born 1938)
- 2012 – Tony Greig, South African-Australian cricketer and sportscaster (born 1946)
- 2012 – Roland Griffiths-Marsh, Malaysian-Australian soldier and author (born 1923)
- 2012 – Edward Meneeley, American painter and sculptor (born 1927)
- 2012 – Ben Overton, American jurist (born 1926)
- 2012 – William Rees-Mogg, British newspaper journalist (born 1928)
- 2012 – Salvador Reyes Monteón, Mexican footballer and manager (born 1936)
- 2012 – Paulo Rocha, Portuguese director and screenwriter (born 1935)
- 2012 – Bruce Stark, American cartoonist (born 1933)
- 2012 – Ignacy Tokarczuk, Polish archbishop (born 1918)
- 2013 – C. T. Hsia, Chinese-American critic and scholar (born 1921)
- 2013 – Paul Comstive, English footballer (born 1961)
- 2013 – Benjamin Curtis, American guitarist, drummer, and songwriter (born 1978)
- 2013 – Connie Dierking, American basketball player (born 1936)
- 2013 – Wojciech Kilar, Polish classical and film music composer (born 1932)
- 2013 – Besik Kudukhov, Russian wrestler (born 1986)
- 2013 – Jagadish Mohanty, Indian author and translator (born 1951)
- 2013 – Mike O'Connor, German-American journalist (born 1946)
- 2014 – Syed Hamid, Indian academic and diplomat (born 1920)
- 2014 – Hari Harilela, Indian-Hong Kong businessman and philanthropist (born 1922)
- 2014 – Odd Iversen, Norwegian footballer (born 1945)
- 2014 – Juanito Remulla, Sr., Filipino lawyer and politician, Governor of Cavite (born 1933)
- 2015 – Om Prakash Malhotra, Indian general and politician, 25th Governor of Punjab (born 1922)
- 2015 – Pavel Srníček, Czech footballer and coach (born 1968)
- 2015 – Kim Yang-gon, North Korean politician (born 1942)
- 2016 – Keion Carpenter, American football defensive back (born 1977)
- 2016 – LaVell Edwards, American football head coach (born 1930)
- 2017 – Peggy Cummins, Irish actress (born 1925)
- 2017 – John C. Portman Jr., American neofuturistic architect and real estate developer (born 1924)
- 2018 – Brian Garfield, American novelist, historian and screenwriter (born 1939)
- 2018 – Rosenda Monteros, Mexican actress (born 1935)
- 2019 – Alasdair Gray, Scottish writer and artist (born 1934)
- 2019 – Neil Innes, English writer, comedian and musician (born 1944)
- 2020 – Pierre Cardin, Italian-French fashion designer (born 1922)
- 2020 – Joe Louis Clark, American educator (born 1937)
- 2020 – Alexi Laiho, Finnish singer-songwriter and guitarist (born 1979)
- 2021 – Peter Klatzow, South African composer (born 1945)
- 2022 – Pelé, Brazilian footballer (born 1940)
- 2022 – Edgar Savisaar, Estonian politician, Estonian Minister of the Interior (born 1950)
- 2022 – Vivienne Westwood, English fashion designer (born 1941)
- 2023 – Gil de Ferran, French-born Brazilian racing driver, CART champion (2000, 2001), 2003 Indianapolis 500 winner (born 1967)
- 2024 – Aaron Brown, American journalist and academic (born 1948)
- 2024 – Jimmy Carter, American politician, 39th President of the United States (born 1924)
- 2024 – Linda Lavin, American actress and singer (born 1937)
- 2024 – Tomiko Itooka, Japanese supercentenarian (born 1908)

== Holidays and observances ==
- Christian feast day:
  - Ebrulf
  - Thomas Becket
  - Trophimus of Arles
  - December 29 (Eastern Orthodox liturgics)
- Constitution Day (Ireland)
- Independence Day (Mongolia)
- The fifth day of Christmas (Western Christianity)
- The fourth day of Kwanzaa (United States)
