= Stalingrad station =

Stalingrad station could refer to:

- Stalingrad station (Paris Metro), on the Paris Metro
- Volgograd railway station, known as Stalingrad from 1925–1961
