= Morisaki =

Morisaki (written: 森崎 lit. "forest peninsula") is a Japanese surname. Notable people with the surname include:

- Azuma Morisaki (森崎 東; 1927–2020), Japanese film director and screenwriter
- Kazuyuki Morisaki (森﨑 和幸; born 1981), Japanese footballer
- Kōji Morisaki (森﨑 浩司; born 1981), Japanese footballer
- Yoshiyuki Morisaki (森崎 嘉之; born 1976), Japanese footballer
- Yuki Morisaki (森崎 友紀; born 1979), Japanese chef and television personality
- Hiroyuki Morisaki (森崎 博之, born 1971), Japanese actor and television personality
