= Food Wars!: Shokugeki no Soma =

Japanese manga series and its adaptations

- First tankōbon volume cover, featuring Soma Yukihira

食戟のソーマ (Shokugeki no Sōma)
- Genre: Comedy; Cooking; Slice of life
- Manga
- Written by: Yūto Tsukuda
- Illustrated by: Shun Saeki
- Published by: Shueisha
- English publisher: NA: Viz Media
- Imprint: Jump Comics
- Magazine: Weekly Shōnen Jump; Jump Giga
- English magazine: NA: Weekly Shonen Jump
- Original run: November 26, 2012 – August 29, 2019
- Volumes: 36
- Light novel

Shokugeki no Sōma: À la carte
- Written by: Michiko Itō
- Illustrated by: Shun Saeki
- Published by: Shueisha
- Imprint: Jump J-Books
- Original run: February 4, 2014 – April 3, 2015
- Volumes: 3
- Manga

Shokugeki no Sōma: L'étoile
- Written by: Michiko Itō
- Illustrated by: Taiki Asatoki
- Published by: Shueisha
- Magazine: Shōnen Jump+
- Original run: March 3, 2015 – June 21, 2019
- Volumes: 8
- Anime television series
- Directed by: Yoshitomo Yonetani
- Produced by: Noriko Dohi; Kouhei Kawase; Ryuu Hashimoto; Ryousuke Mori; Horkazu Hara; Jun Fukuda; Akifumi Fujio; Hiroshi Kamei; Terushige Yoshie; Souji Miyagi; Ayako Ooyama; Ryuutarou Usukura
- Written by: Shōgo Yasukawa
- Music by: Tatsuya Kato
- Studio: J.C.Staff
- Licensed by: Crunchyroll (Note: In North America, through Crunchyroll, LLC (formerly known as Funimation) and, in Australia, through Crunchyroll Store Australia (formerly known as Madman Anime).); NA: Sentai Filmworks (Note: Despite Crunchyroll having the license for seasons 3–5, Sentai still controls home media releases and in-house English dubbing for the series.); UK: Animatsu Entertainment (expired); Anime Limited (current); SA/SEA: Medialink
- Original network: TBS, MBS, CBC, BS-TBS, Animax, Tokyo MX, BS11
- English network: NA: Anime Network; US: Adult Swim (Toonami)
- Original run: April 4, 2015 – September 26, 2020
- Episodes: 86
- Light novel

Shokugeki no Sōma: Fratelli Aldini
- Written by: Michiko Itō
- Illustrated by: Shun Saeki
- Published by: Shueisha
- Imprint: Jump J-Books
- Published: October 2, 2015
- Video games
- Shokugeki no Soma: The Ultimate Recipe (2015); Shokugeki no Soma: The Dish of Friendship and Bonds (2015)
- icon

Food Wars!: Shokugeki no Soma (Japanese: 食戟のソーマ, Hepburn: Shokugeki no Sōma; lit. 'Sōma of the Shokugeki') is a Japanese manga series written by Yūto Tsukuda and illustrated by Shun Saeki. It was serialized in Shueisha's Weekly Shōnen Jump from November 2012 to June 2019. Its chapters were collected in 36 tankōbon volumes published by Shueisha. The series follows an aspiring chef who enrolls in an elite culinary school where students take part in cooking competitions. Yuki Morisaki also works as a contributor, providing the recipes for the series. The manga is licensed by Viz Media in North America, who has been releasing the volumes digitally since March 2014, and released the first volume in print in August 2014.

An anime television series adaptation produced by J.C.Staff aired for five seasons between April 2015 and September 2020. The series has also had a pair of video games released in 2015.

By March 2020, the manga had over 20 million copies in circulation. The series has received positive reactions to the narrative and genuine recipes depicted.

== Synopsis ==
=== Setting ===
The series is set mainly at Tōtsuki Culinary Academy (Tōtsuki Saryō Ryōri Gakuen), an elite culinary school located in Tokyo, Japan, where only a handful of students graduate from each year. (Note: While the English manga volume 1 back cover indicates the school has a 10% graduation rate, it appears to be about 1%, as Dean Senzaemon says in his opening speech that in the last year, of 812 entering freshman, only 76 made it to the second year, and that the number of students who graduate each year can be counted on one hand.^{Ch. 4}) Its students mostly come from Totsuki's junior high school, but transfers are taken provided that they pass the entrance exam. The campus is a wide-ranging resort with many research societies (clubs), cooking classrooms, and large arenas used for competitions.

The top student chefs occupy seats on the Council of Ten Masters, the highest governing body in the school aside from the school director. Students can initiate a shokugeki (anime: food war), a cook-off with stipulations on the line, with any other student or alumnus. Battles fought in this way could be for cooking utensils, research society facilities, council membership, or even expulsion from the school.

=== Plot ===
Teenager Soma Yukihira aspires to become a full-time chef in his father Joichiro's family restaurant, "Restaurant Yukihira", and to surpass his father's culinary skills. However, Joichiro gets a new job that requires him to travel around the world and close his shop. Joichiro has enrolled Soma in Tōtsuki Culinary Academy, an elite culinary school where students engage in cooking competitions called shokugeki. Soma secures himself a spot at the school, despite the objections of Erina Nakiri, the talented granddaughter of the school's dean. Soma is assigned to Polaris Dormitory where he meets other aspiring chefs, including Megumi Tadokoro. The story follows his adventures as he interacts with his peers and challenges Tōtsuki's students as well as others in shokugeki competitions. Learning that his father was not only a student of Tōtsuki, but also the second seat in the Council of Ten, Soma plans on becoming the best at the academy.

Soma and the other first-year students participate in a cooking camp judged by the school's alumni who expels about a third of the entering class. He enters the Fall Classic, a competition that takes the top 60 first-year students and pares them down to eight students who then compete in a single elimination tournament, The Autumn Elections. The first-years then participate in week-long stagiaire internships at local restaurants, as well as a large-scale school-wide Moon Festival. During the Moon Festival, Erina's father Azami takes over the school, and Soma and Erina form a rebel faction to challenge the establishment. The disgruntled members of the Council join the Rebel Faction and with support from Joichiro and Gin, the Rebels confront Azami's organization "Central" in a Regiment De Cuisine (Team Shokugeki). Eventually the Rebels emerge victorious and oust Azami with Erina as the new Headmaster.

Afterwards, Soma and the others enter into their second year. Several of the members in the Fall Classic have been promoted into the council, replacing the graduating third year batch. Their first assignment concerns about the existence of "dark chefs", those who work with criminal organizations and other VIPs. A particular organization, the "Les Cuisiniers Noirs", is led by Joichiro's former protege Asahi Saiba who defeated the former. Asahi infiltrates Totsuki, and abducts Erina from the academy, with the intention to marry her. To recover Erina, the trio of Soma, Megumi and Takumi participate in an invitation-only cooking competition called BLUE, organized by the World Gourmet Organization under its Headmaster Mana Nakiri, Erina's mother. The trio encounter and fight against the Dark Chefs, with Soma eventually defeating Asahi. The manga ends with Soma and Erina facing each other in the final match of BLUE. Erina acknowledges Soma's cooking but insists on calling it "disgusting".

In the events of the epilogue ~Le dessert~, after the events of BLUE, Soma took an indefinite leave before taking the third year exams. During this time Erina and Hisako ask Joichiro about his past with Tamako, whereas Mana and Azami discover that Asahi is Azami's biological son and Erina's half-brother, leading the former to request him to join the Nakiri family. Many years after all Jewel Generation students graduation from Totsuki, Soma tells Erina that he's returning home and offers another challenge for her to which she gladly accepts, certain that he will make Erina finally say "delicious".

== Conception and development ==
Yuto Tsukuda has worked on two minor sports manga series, Shōnen Shikku which was about soccer; and Ao no Rettou which was about ski jumping, the latter series he wrote while Food Wars was serialized. In an interview with Anime News Network, Tsukuda said that illustrator Shun Saeki "came up with the idea of a girl eating food, and she expresses herself about the food with 'ecstasy'," but since Saeki wanted to focus on drawing the manga, he needed someone to write a storyline so he got Tsukuda. Tsukuda said that he knew Saeki as a senpai from university. Celebrity chef Yuki Morisaki was brought in as a food consultant. Regarding the dynamics of the team, Tsukuda said that his "motivation throughout this whole project came from wanting to demonstrate the greatness of Saeki-sensei's art", and for Saeki, he didn't think he had the storytelling power that Tsukuda had.

Tsukuda said that he and Saeki would collaborate on ideas for the storyline, and that later their editor would also be involved in the discussion. Some of the reactions to the dishes were the result of free association games, where they would pick some of the unexpected phrases. They keep a library of possible dishes that they researched before and every week they would see if any would fit their storyline.

== Media ==
=== Manga ===
Food Wars!: Shokugeki no Soma is written by Yūto Tsukuda and illustrated by Shun Saeki. A one-shot was first published in Shueisha's Jump Next! in April 2012. The manga began its serialization in Weekly Shōnen Jump on November 26, 2012. The series finished in the magazine on June 17, 2019, while a three-chapter sequel titled Shokugeki no Soma -Le dessert- was published in Jump Giga from June 27 to August 29, 2019. The first tankōbon volume was published on April 4, 2013. The 36th and last volume was published on October 4, 2019. Viz Media has licensed the manga for North America and published the first volume on August 5, 2014, and the last on June 2, 2020. Shueisha began to simulpublish the series in English on the website and app Manga Plus in January 2019.

A spin-off series, titled Shokugeki no Soma: L'étoile, ran in the Shōnen Jump+ website and app from February 20, 2015, to June 21, 2019. The individual chapters have been collected in eight tankōbon volumes. A crossover story, titled Shokugeki no Sanji, was developed as a tribute to One Piece and has been published in Weekly Shōnen Jump since July 23, 2018. Two light novels, written by Michiko Itō, were also released, titled À la carte in 2014 and Fratelli Aldini in 2015.

=== Anime ===
An anime adaptation was announced in October 2014 by Shueisha. The anime was directed by Yoshitomo Yonetani at J.C.Staff with Shogo Yasukawa as the series scriptwriter and starred Yoshitsugu Matsuoka as the main character, Sōma Yukihira. Crunchyroll began streaming the anime on April 4, 2015. Sentai Filmworks licensed the anime for digital and home video release in North America; after the acquisition of Crunchyroll by Sony Pictures Television, the first two seasons along with Sentai's titles, were dropped from the Crunchyroll streaming service on March 31, 2022. In Southeast Asia and South Asia, the series is licensed by Medialink. For the first fourteen episodes of the first season, the series' opening theme is "Kibō no Uta" (希望の唄, The Song of Hope) by Ultra Tower, and the ending theme is "Spice" (スパイス, Supaisu) by Tokyo Karankoron. From episode fifteen onwards, the opening theme is "Rising Rainbow" (ライジングレインボウ, Raijingu Reinbō) by Misokkasu, while the ending theme is "Sacchan's Sexy Curry" (さっちゃんのセクシーカレー, Sacchan no Sekushī Karē) by Seiko Oomori. A 25-minute original video animation (OVA) was bundled with the 19th volume of the manga, which released on July 4, 2016. It was later released on DVD releases alongside Black Clover and My Hero Academia bundled with the future volumes of their respective manga, as it was announced on Jump Special Anime Festa event. A second OVA was also released as a part of the first season.

A 13-episode second season, titled Food Wars! Shokugeki no Soma: The Second Plate (食戟のソーマ 弍ノ皿, Shokugeki no Sōma: Ni no Sara) aired from July 2 to September 24, 2016. A fourth OVA was released with the 25th manga volume on July 4, 2017. The second season's opening theme song is "Rough Diamonds" by Screen Mode, while the ending theme song is "Snowdrop" (スノードロップ) by Nano Ripe. A third OVA was bundled with 24th manga volume.

The first cour of the third season, titled Food Wars! Shokugeki no Soma: The Third Plate, aired from October 4 to December 20, 2017. A fifth OVA was released during the third series. The first opening theme song is "Braver" by Zaq, while the ending theme song is "Kyokyo Jitsujitsu" (虚虚実実) by Nano Ripe. The second half aired from April 9 to June 25, 2018. The second opening theme is "Symbol" (シンボル) by Luck Life, and the ending theme song is "Atria" (アトリア) by Fo'xTails. In July 2019, Sentai Filmworks licensed season 3, which released on home video with an English dub in 2020. A fourth season entitled Food Wars! Shokugeki no Soma: The Fourth Plate (食戟のソーマ 神ノ皿, Shokugeki no Sōma: Shin no Sara) aired from October 12 to December 28, 2019. The opening theme is "Chronos" by Stereo Dive Foundation, while the ending theme song is "Emblem" by Nano Ripe.

A fifth and last season entitled Food Wars! Shokugeki no Soma: The Fifth Plate (食戟のソーマ 五ノ皿, Shokugeki no Sōma: Go no Sara) aired from April 11 to September 26, 2020. The opening theme is "Last Chapter" by Nano Ripe, while the ending theme song is "Crossing Road" by Mai Fuchigami. On April 17, 2020, it was announced that after the second episode, the remaining episodes of season would be delayed until further notice due to the effects of the COVID-19 pandemic. In late May 2020, it was announced that weekly new episodes would resume on July 18 after Japanese TV stations reran the first two episodes on July 4 and July 11.

In the United States, the series aired the English dub on Adult Swim's Toonami programming block from July 7, 2019, to June 18, 2023.

=== Video games ===
Two games released in Japan were produced. Food Wars! Shokugeki no Soma: The Ultimate Recipe (食戟のソーマ 最饗のレシピ, Shokugeki no Soma: Saikyō no Recipe) is a mobile game published by Bandai Namco Entertainment. The game was released for iOS and Android on August 17, 2015.

Food Wars! Shokugeki no Soma: The Dish of Friendship and Bonds (食戟のソーマ 友情と絆の一皿, Shokugeki no Soma: Yūjō to Kizuna no Hitosara) is a visual novel developed by FuRyu and published by Bandai Namco Entertainment. It was released for the Nintendo 3DS on December 17, 2015. A teaser trailer was revealed on May 24, 2015. The game features an original story that takes place in Europe while characters from the series interact among each other. In addition, the characters will be voiced by their respective voice actors from the anime. Gameplay requires little interaction from the player as most of the duration of the game is spent on reading the text that appears on the screen which represents either the dialogue between the various characters or the thoughts of the protagonist. Like many other visual novels, players will go through all kinds of situational events as the original story unfolds.

== Reception ==
=== Critical response ===
Rebecca Silverman of Anime News Network gave the first volume of the manga series a B; praising the art and Soma as a likeable protagonist. However, she called the amount of fan service unnecessary and noted that it might make some readers uncomfortable. On the conclusion of the first series, Silverman commented "bumpy run with a slow start and some problems along the way". Ashley Hawkins writing for Manga Library called the manga a "insta-buy" due to its depictions of food and how the recipes are genuine. However, she was also put off by the amount of fan service present in both the manga and anime.

Cecilia D'Anastasio writing a piece on fan service for Kotaku also commented that they wouldn't watch the anime, saying it had a "distracting breast-to-food quotient". Russel Fernande, of One Tech Traveller gave the series a 4.7/5, calling it "addictive". The manga ranked twelfth on the 2014 Kono Manga ga Sugoi! Top 20 Manga for Male Readers survey, and third in the Nationwide Bookstore Employees' Recommended Comics of 2014. Dan Barnett commented for the UK Anime Network that despite it having a "simplistic structure", the series was "utterly brilliant". However, Helen Knight, also writing for the UK Anime Network likened the series to the marmite slogan "either you love it or hate it".

=== Sales ===
Volume 1 has sold 139,657 copies by April 28, 2013; volume 2 has sold 176,682 copies by June 16, 2013; volume 3 has sold 238,590 copies by August 18, 2013; volume 4 has sold 252,975 copies by September 22, 2013; volume 5 has sold 271,570 copies by December 22, 2013; volume 6 has sold 277,726 copies by February 23, 2014; and volume 7 has sold 279,364 copies by April 20, 2014. By May 2, 2018, it was revealed that the manga had 14 million copies in print; the manga sales had 19 million copies in print by June 17, 2019; and it reached 20 million by March 2020.

== See also ==
- Cooking Papa (1985 debut), a cooking manga and anime series
- Chūka Ichiban! (1995 debut), a cooking manga series
- Iron Wok Jan (1995 debut), a cooking manga and anime series
- The God of Cookery (1996), a Stephen Chow cooking film
- Oishinbo (1983 debut), a cooking manga and anime series
- Yakitate!! Japan (2001 debut), a cooking manga and anime series
- Tenmaku Cinema (2023), another manga series by the same authors
