= Tenmaku Cinema =

Japanese manga series

- First tankōbon volume cover

テンマクキネマ (Tenmaku Kinema)
- Genre: Coming of age; Drama; Supernatural
- Manga
- Written by: Yūto Tsukuda
- Illustrated by: Shun Saeki
- Published by: Shueisha
- English publisher: NA: Viz Media
- Imprint: Jump Comics
- Magazine: Weekly Shōnen Jump
- Original run: April 10, 2023 – September 11, 2023
- Volumes: 3
- icon

Tenmaku Cinema (Japanese: テンマクキネマ, Hepburn: Tenmaku Kinema) is a Japanese manga series written by Yūto Tsukuda and illustrated by Shun Saeki. It was serialized in It was serialized in Shueisha's shōnen manga magazine Weekly Shōnen Jump from April to September 2023, with its chapters collected in three tankōbon volumes.

== Plot ==
Shinichi Hajime is a 14-year-old junior high school student who is a massive fan of cinema – as he was born sickly, most of his early life experiences came from watching movies in his hospital bed. One day, while in a theater, he is possessed by a ghost. The ghost introduces himself as Tenmaku Takehiko – an 18-year-old screenwriter who was working on a legendary movie with acclaimed director Ryu Shirakawa before dying thirty years ago. Bound to Shinichi's body, Tenmaku posits that the only way for him to pass on to the afterlife is for his unwritten script ideas to come to fruition – by having Shinichi produce and direct his movies.

== Publication ==
Written by Yūto Tsukuda and illustrated by Shun Saeki, Tenmaku Cinema was serialized in It was serialized in Shueisha's shōnen manga magazine Weekly Shōnen Jump from April 10 to September 11, 2023. It is the first time Tsukuda and Saeki worked together since the Yugen's All-Ghouls Homeroom one-shot in May 2020. A bonus chapter was published in Shueisha's Shōnen Jump+ service in November 2023. The series was compiled into three tankōbon volumes from August 4, to November 2, 2023.

Viz Media and Manga Plus published chapters of the series simultaneously with their original release.

=== Volume list ===
No.	Original release date	Original ISBN	English release date	English ISBN
1	August 4, 2023	978-4-08-883589-1	January 28, 2025 (digital)	978-1-9747-4418-3
01. "The First Movie"; 02. "Starring: Himeki Kurakui"; 03. "The Shore and the Movie Research Club"; 04. "Hajime and Tenmaku on the Town"; 05. "On Her Beach"; 06. "Tell Me"; 07. "The Director's Job"
2	October 4, 2023	978-4-08-883663-8	January 28, 2025 (digital)	978-1-9747-5338-3
08. "One-Line Stage Direction"; 09. "Actor: Himeki Kurakui"; 10. "Director Fukashi Yukio"; 11. "First Friend"; 12. "An Actor's Disposition"; 13. "Takihiko Tenmaku"; 14. "Himeki's Summer Vacation"; 15. "Movies and Music"; 16. "Hectic Shooting"
3	November 2, 2023	978-4-08-883771-0	January 28, 2025 (digital)	978-1-9747-5339-0
17. "Beach Location Trip, Day One"; 18. "Day 2, Last Day"; 19. "Rain in Shibuya"; 20. "The Night Before Submission"; 21. "The First Movie (Continued)"

== Reception ==
Multiple critics have compared the series' story to Hikaru no Go. Some critics also offered praise to the filmmaking aspects of the story, with Marc York of Comic Book Resources comparing it to Dr. Stone. Joshua Fox of Screen Rant praised the darker story than Hikaru no Go; he also liked the occasional comedic moments. Brian Salvatore of Multiversity Comics liked the series, though he felt it used too many tropes; he also felt the series over-sexualized some of its characters. Kota Mukaihara of Real Sound compared Tsukuda and Saeki's transition from their previous work Food Wars!: Shokugeki no Soma to Tsugumi Ohba and Takeshi Obata's transition from Death Note to Bakuman.

Salvatore felt the artwork did a good job emphasizing the series' comedic moments and making other parts feel more creepy. He concluded that "Saeki does really nice work here that pushes the story beyond its familiar roots".

== See also ==
- Food Wars!: Shokugeki no Soma, another manga series by the same authors
