= December 2013 Volgograd bombings =

Two suicide bombings in the city of Volgograd, Volgograd Oblast, Southern Russia

December 2013 Volgograd Bombings
- Part of the insurgency in the North Caucasus, Islamic terrorism in Europe and terrorism in Russia
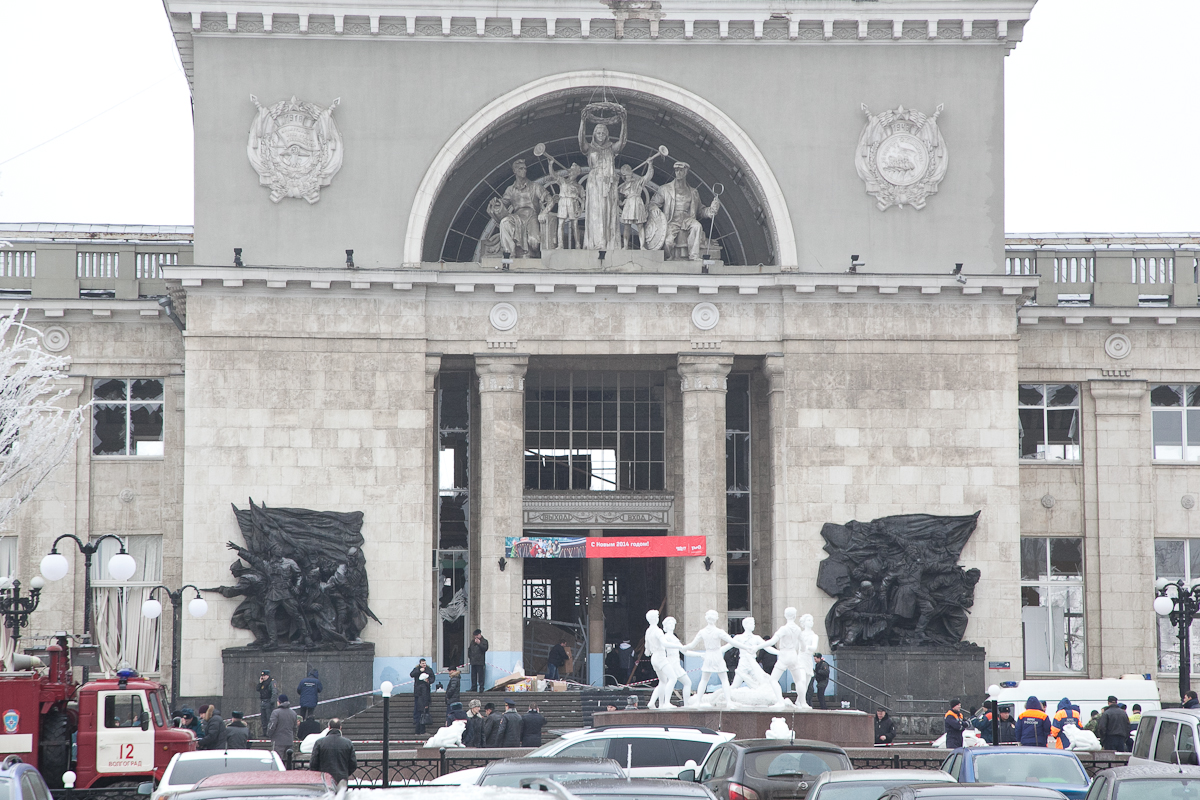
- Site of the 29 December railway bombing

- Location of Volgograd Oblast in Russia
- Location: 48°42′45″N 44°30′49″E (railway station); 48°44′10″N 44°29′53″E (trolleybus); Volgograd, Volgograd Oblast, Southern Federal District, Russia
- Date: 29 and 30 December 2013
- Target: Civilians in public transportation
- Attack type: Suicide bombings, mass murder, Islamic terrorism
- Deaths: 32 (+2 perpetrators): Volgograd-1 station: 18; Trolleybus: 16
- Injuries: 85: Volgograd-1 station: 44; Trolleybus: 41
- Perpetrator: Caucasus Emirate: Vilayat Dagestan
- Motive: North Caucasus separatism, Islamic extremism

In December 2013, two separate suicide bombings a day apart targeted mass transportation in the city of Volgograd, in the Volgograd Oblast of Southern Russia, killing 34 people overall, including both perpetrators. The attacks followed a bus bombing carried out in the same city two months earlier.

== Train station bombing on 29 December ==
CCTV footage of the train station bombing

On 29 December 2013, a suicide bombing took place at the Volgograd-1 station in the city of Volgograd, in the Volgograd Oblast of Southern Russia. It killed 18 people and injured at least 44, 38 of whom were hospitalized. The attack occurred around 12:45 Moscow Time, close to metal detectors near the entrance of the station. The bomb contained the equivalent of 10 kilograms (22 lb) of TNT. Footage of the explosion was captured by two CCTV cameras inside the station and one outside.

The attack was initially thought to have been carried out by a female suicide bomber, sometimes known in Russian as a shahidka ("Black Widow"). Authorities identified the perpetrator as Oksana Aslanova. However, there was later uncertainty as to the identity of the bomber, with some news agencies stating the perpetrator was male. Some sources reported that the last name of the perpetrator was Pavlov. On 30 December it was reported that the perpetrator was an ethnic Russian convert to Islam from the city of Volzhsk, in the Mari El Republic, by the name of Pavel Pechenkin, who changed his name to Ar-Rusi after conversion to Islam. He was born to an ethnic Russian father, Nikolai, and a Muslim mother, Fanaziya, who both appealed to their son to abstain from violence and attempted to find him in Dagestan. On 7 January some newspapers reported that Pechenkin was cleared from the accusation of being involved with the bombing.

Increasing the confusion, some newspapers mistakenly reported Pechenkin as responsible for the 30 December Volgograd explosion (in the trolleybus). Experts suspect that Dokka Umarov, an Islamist militant who has called for suicide terror attacks and has a history of supporting past attacks, was behind the attacks in Volgograd. Members of Vilayat Dagestan, part of Umarov's Caucasus Emirate took credit for the attack on 19 January.

Russian President Vladimir Putin ordered the most seriously injured to be flown to Moscow for specialist treatment.

== Trolleybus bombing on 30 December ==
A second suicide attack took place on the morning of 30 December at about 8:30 Moscow Time in the Dzerzhinsky district in Volgograd. The bombing targeted a No. 1233 trolleybus of route 15A, which connects a suburb to Volgograd's downtown area, as it was passing one of the city's markets. From eyewitness photographs, it appears that the explosion took place in the back of the trolleybus. The attack killed 16 people and injured 41, 27 of whom were hospitalized. Remains of the male bomber were located and sent for genetic testing.

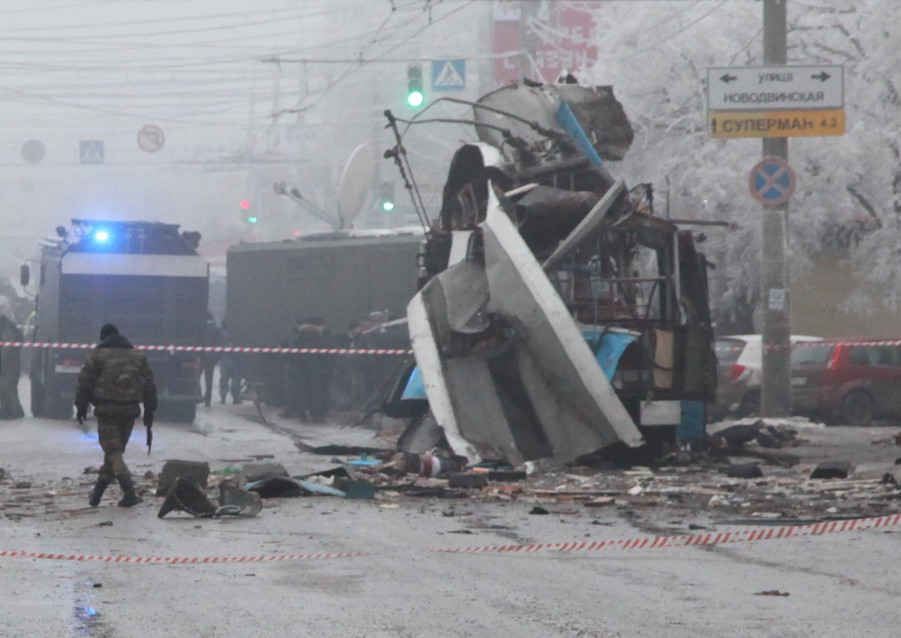
Emergency response an hour after the explosion

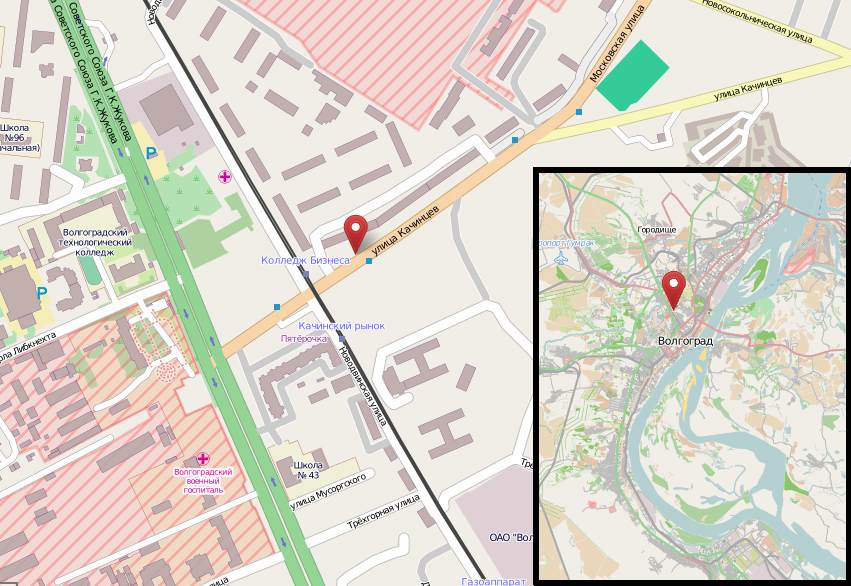
Location of the trolleybus bombing

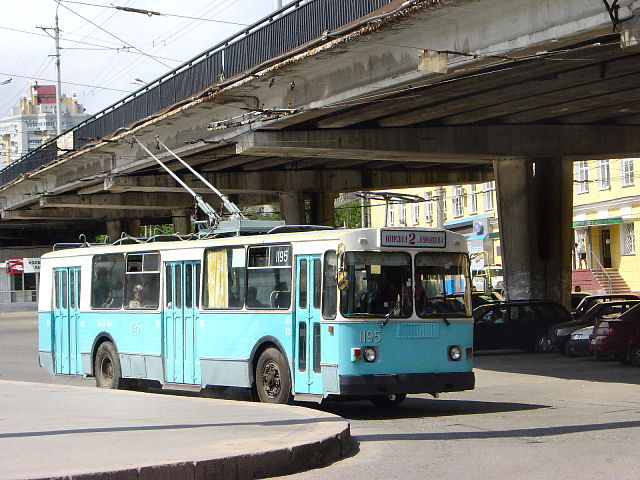
ZiU-9 trolleybus vehicle

== Responsibility ==
In 2013, Putin blamed "foreign rivals" for using radical Islam for the attacks. On 19 January 2014, a statement and video claiming responsibility for the bombings was posted on the website of Vilayat Dagestan, a subgroup of the Caucasus Emirate. The video shows two Russian speaking men, identified as Suleiman and Abdurakhman, preparing explosives and strapping them to their bodies.

== Reactions ==
=== Russia ===
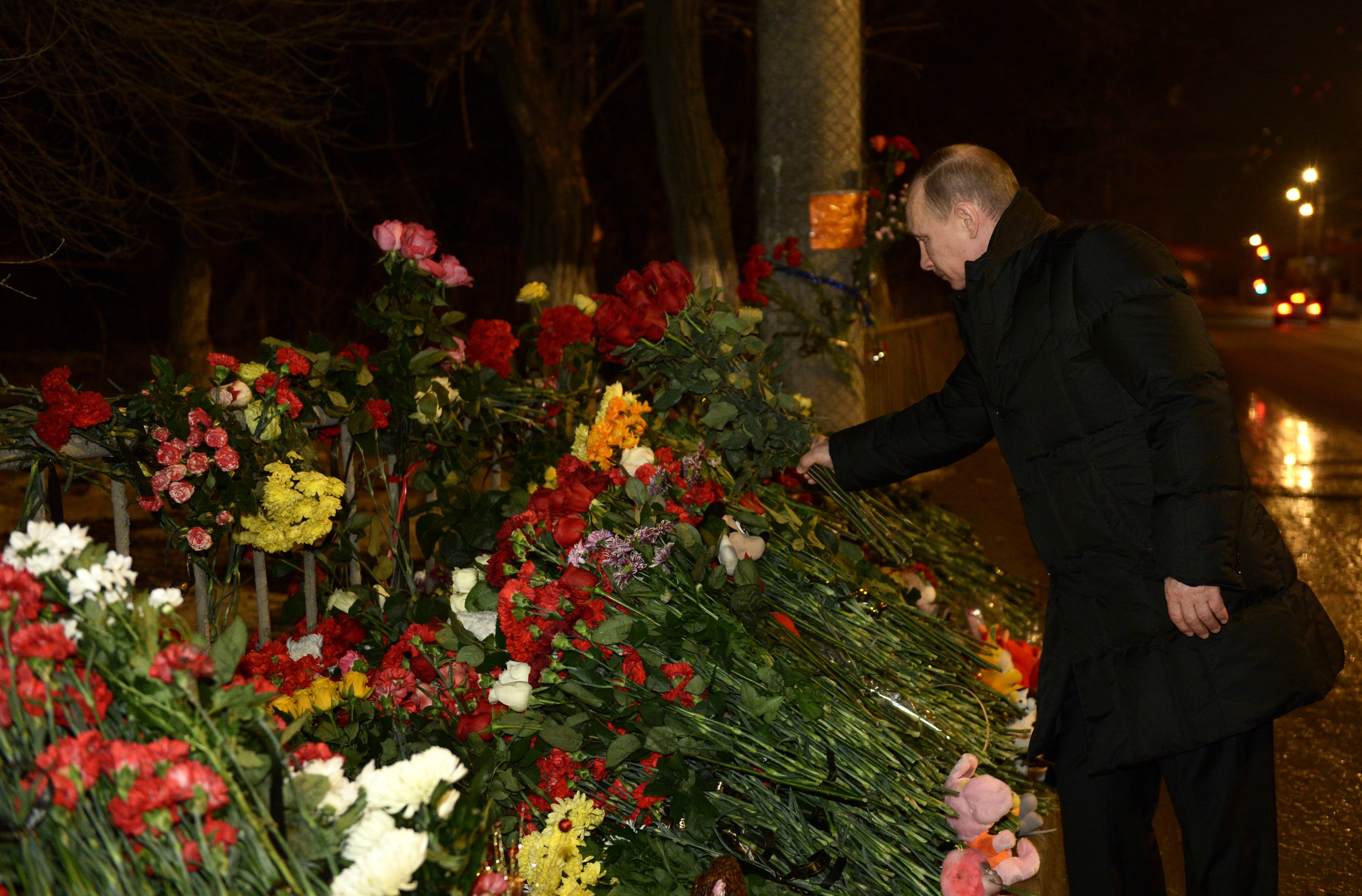
Putin in Volgograd, 1 January 2014

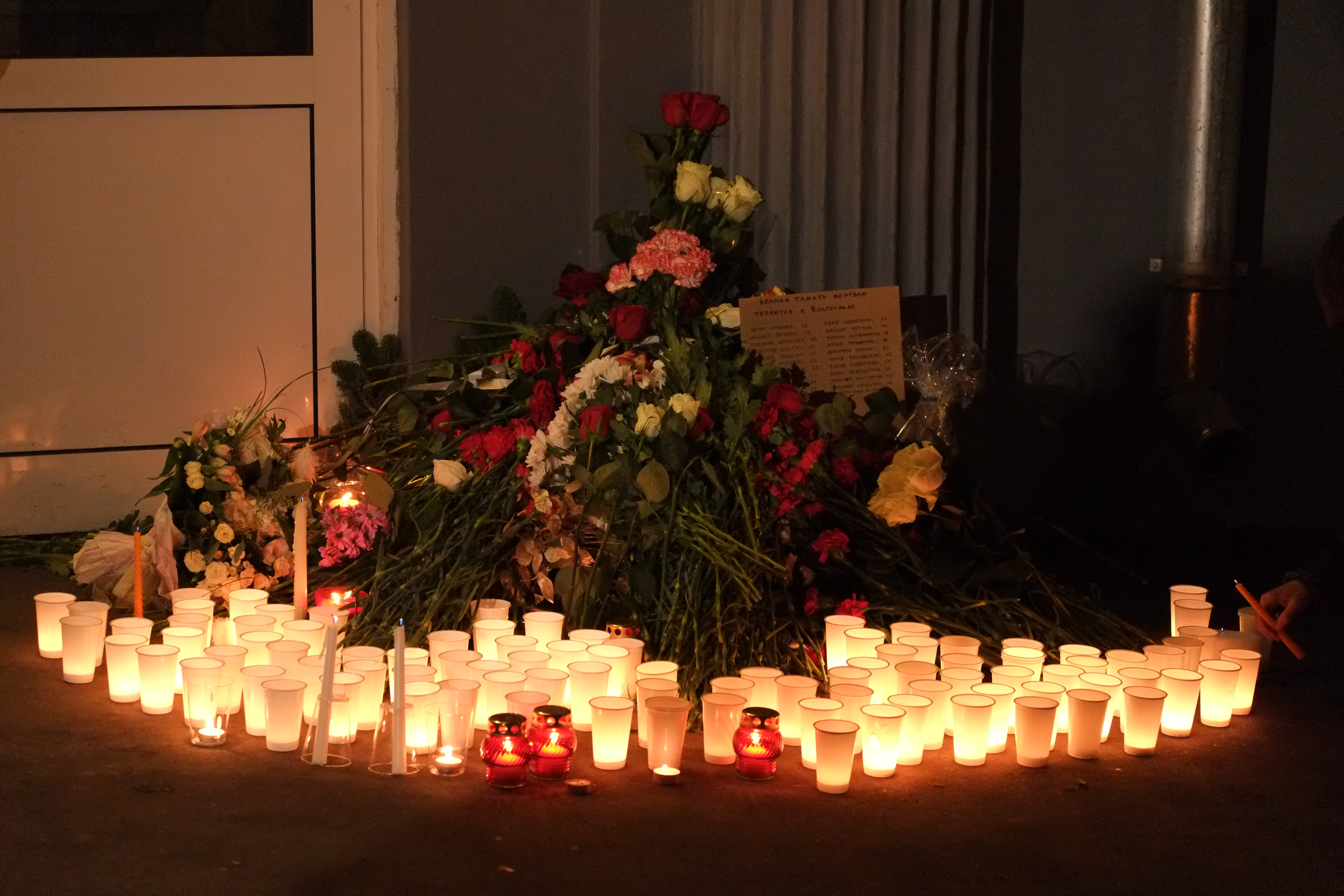
Candles and flowers near the building of Volgograd region representatives in Moscow

The regional governor declared five days of mourning for the victims. The Ministry of Internal Affairs ordered general strengthened security at transportation facilities countrywide. Secretary of the Russian Security Council Nikolai Patrushev called a special meeting of the National Anti-Terrorism Committee to discuss the terrorist acts and possible countermeasures. Volunteers and Cossacks were mobilized to provide additional protection. The chief of the Volgograd Oblast's main Interior Ministry department assumed operational command of the Volgograd Interior Ministry Academy's staff and troops deployed in the town of Kalach.

People laid flowers and lit candles near the building of Volgograd region representatives in Moscow to express their solidarity with the victims.

A spokesman for the Investigative Committee stated that the explosives used in both explosions were identical and that the attacks were therefore linked.

Vladimir Putin flew to Volgograd on 1 January 2014, hours after delivering his customary televised New Year’s speech; this had to be re-recorded so that he could mention the Volgograd bombings. Shortly after landing in Volgograd he delivered a speech at a meeting with senior regional and federal officials to discuss "what is being done here and all across the country to maintain public security" and said that "the heinousness of the crime committed here in Volgograd needs no additional comments. No matter what motivates the criminals, there is no justification for the killing of civilians, especially women and children." He vowed that his country would continue to battle terrorists until all are eliminated and that Russian forces would "do their utmost to protect women and children during their operations". Additionally, he said that Russian Muslims should be careful from "foreign rivals" who use radical Islam to weaken Russia. After the meeting, he laid flowers at the site of the trolleybus attack and visited victims who were being treated in one of the city’s hospitals.

On 1 January, the Orthodox icon called the Softener of Evil Hearts was flown around Volgograd on a helicopter. A prayer service for the victims was held in Kazan Cathedral.

=== International ===
NATO's general secretary Anders Fogh Rasmussen condemned the attack as "barbarous" and said that "NATO and Russia stand together in the fight against terrorism, including by working together on technology to prevent attacks on public transport systems." The International Olympic Committee expressed sympathy for the victims and underlined that they trusted that Russia's security arrangements for the Olympic games would be adequate.

The Government of Chile issued a statement condemning "in the strongest terms the terrorist attacks", adding that "the government and people of Chile deliver to the government and people of the Russian Federation and the families of the victims their deepest condolences and feelings of solidarity". The President of Israel said "My heart goes out to those who have been affected by the heinous deed and by previous attacks which have afflicted Russia", while the Prime Minister stated: "I have no doubt that the citizens of Volgograd will continue to demonstrate the resilience, resolve and courage for which their city is renowned. Our thoughts and prayers are with you and the Russian people at this difficult time". The Government of Colombia, through its Ministry of Foreign Affairs, condemned the attacks perpetrated in Volgograd and expressed its condolences to the families of the victims. Colombia also stated that it "considers the fight against terrorism a priority amongst all nations" and that "mutual cooperation is the most effective way to stop it". The United States also condemned the bombings, saying that "The United States stands in solidarity with the Russian people against terrorism".

== Investigation and trial ==
According to the official investigation, the bombings were organized by a terrorist group called Kadarskaya based in Dagestan and led by Dzhamaltin Mirzayev. Other members involved in planning were Yusup Yakhyayev, Nasrulla Temirkhanov, Arsen Dadayev, Alautdin Dadayev and Ibragim Magomedov; the suicide bombers were Asker Samedov (train station bombing) and Suleyman Magomedov (trolleybus bombing). Two truck driver brothers, Magomednabi Bagirov and Tagir Bagirov, drove the bombers to Volgograd from Dagestan, hiding them in bales of hay. Bagirovs knew the people they were driving are involved with a terrorist cell, but were not aware of their ultimate bombing plans.

Mirzayev, Temirkhanov, Yakhyayev and Arsen Dadayev were killed by law enforcement on 5 February 2014 during a raid. Ibragim Magomedov was arrested during the same raid and testified against Alautdin Dadayev, who was arrested on 20 February 2014. Large quantities of weapons and explosive devices were found in Dadayev's house after his arrest.

On 5 December 2014, Alautdin Dadayev and Ibragim Magomedov were found guilty of participation in illegal armed formation and aiding terrorist activity (articles 208/2 and 205.1/3 of the Criminal Code of Russia) and sentenced to 19 years of imprisonment. Bagirov brothers were found guilty of aiding participants of illegal armed formations (articles 33/5, 208/2) and sentenced to 3 years 10 months of imprisonment each.

== See also ==
- 1977 Moscow bombings
- February 2004 Moscow Metro bombing
- 2009 Nevsky Express bombing
- 2010 Moscow Metro bombings
