= Yuki Morisaki =

Japanese chef and entertainer

- 森崎 友紀
- Born: December 29, 1979 (age 46); Sakai, Osaka, Japan
- Occupations: Chef, entertainer
- Agent: Horipro
- Height: 1.62 m (5 ft 4 in)

Yuki Morisaki (森崎 友紀, Morisaki Yuki; born December 29, 1979, in Sakai, Osaka, Japan) is a Japanese chef, entertainer, and representative of Unity Magenta who is represented by Horipro.

== Filmography ==
=== Series ===
==== Television ====
Year	Title	Network	Notes	Ref.
	Ohaten	Web TV		
	Putsu Sma	TV Asahi		
	Hanamaru Market	TBS		
	Zakkuri Monday	TBS		
	Onegai! Ranking	TV Asahi		
	Owarai Wide Show Marco Porori!	KTV		
	Masahiro Nakai no mi ni Naru Toshokan	TV Asahi		
	Gakeppuchi: Arabian Site Fever	TBS		
	Cartoon KAT-TUN	NTV		
2010	Unnan no Rough Kanji de	TBS		
2010	Moshimo no Simulation Variety Otameshikatsu!	TV Asahi		
2010	Matsumoto Hitoshi no na Hanashi	Fuji TV		
2010	Ta Kajin Mune-ippai	KTV		
2011	Oh! Doya Kao Summit	ABC		
2011	Buramayo Shōgeki File Sekai no Kowai Onna-tachi	TBS		
2011	Mezase! Kaisha no Hoshi	NHK E TV		
2012	Ikinari! Kogane Densetsu	TV Asahi		
2012	5LDK	Fuji TV		
2013	Waratte Iitomo!	Fuji TV		
2014	Osare-san	NOTTV	Guest	
2014	Gaki No Tsukai: Zettai ni Warette wa naikenai: Chikyuu Bouei-Gun	NTV		
2015	High Noon TV Viking!	Fuji TV	Friday corner regular	

Drama

Year	Title	Role	Network	Notes
2012	Akumu no Drive	Reika	BS Asahi	

Anime

Title	Notes	Ref.
Food Wars: Shokugeki no Soma		

==== Radio ====
Year	Title	Network	Notes
	Yūyake Tera-chan Katsudō-chū	NCB	
	Yuki Morisaki no Ohayō! Yu-kitchen	NCB	
2014	Appare Yatte Masu!	MBS Radio	

=== Advertisements ===
Title	Notes
Mitsubishi UFJ Trust and Banking	
NTT DoCoMo	
Tire Garden	
Kabushikigaisha Egao	

=== Magazines ===
Title	Notes
Weekly Playboy	
Dime	
VoCE	
An an	

=== Photo-books ===
Year	Title	Notes
2010	For Men	
	Yuki Morisaki DVD-tsuki Recipe Shashin-shū-shoku to Yoku	

=== Trading cards ===
Year	Title	Notes	Ref.
2011	Yuki Morisaki: Cosplay		

=== DVD ===
Year	Title	Notes
2010	Period'	
	Yuki Morisaki/Period Premium	
2013	Precious	
