= Volgograd railway station =

Major railway station in Volgograd, Volgograd Oblast, Russia

Volgograd-1 Волгоград-1
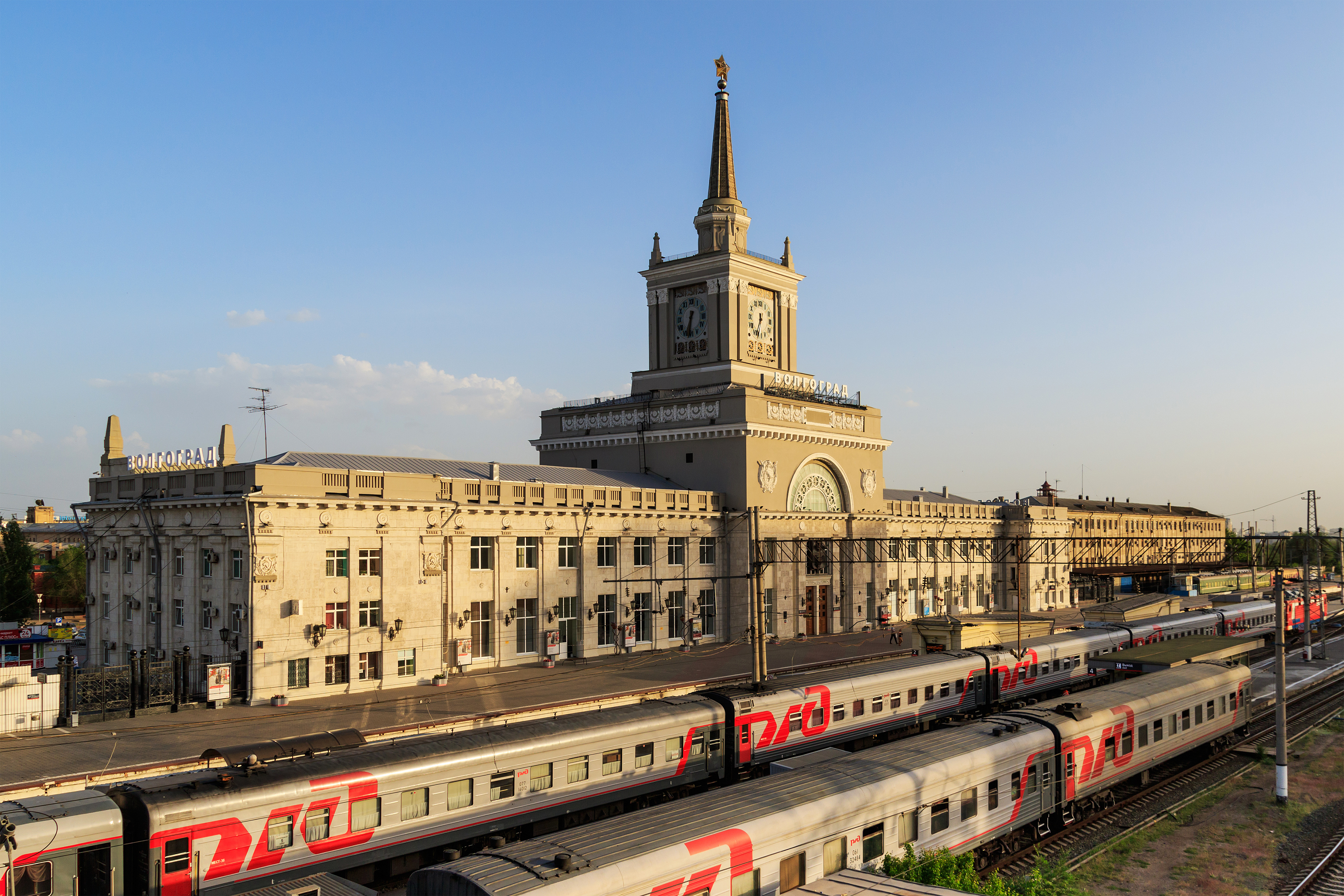
- View of the station from the bridge.

General information
- Location: Volgograd, Russia
- Coordinates: 48°42′45″N 44°30′49″E
- System: Volga Railway terminal
- Owner: Russian Railways
- Platforms: 5 (4 island platforms)
- Tracks: 12

Construction
- Parking: yes

Other information
- Station code: 610008
- Fare zone: 0

History
- Opened: 1862
- Former names: Tsaritsin (before 1925); Stalingrad (1925–1961)

Services
Preceding station	Volga Railway	Following station
Location

Volgograd-Glavny (Russian: Волгоград-Главный) is a major junction railway station of Volgograd in Russia.

It is located in the Central District of the city at Railway Station Square, 1. The station is one of the largest in Russia and serves long-distance trains and suburban trains. The station is the hub for services to five main destinations: Krasnodar, Rostov-on-Don, Moscow, Saratov and Astrakhan.

== History ==
The first railway to serve Tsaritsyn (now Volgograd) was the Volga-Don railway in 1862. The first railway station was constructed of wood. In 1871 the station was replaced with a brick structure.

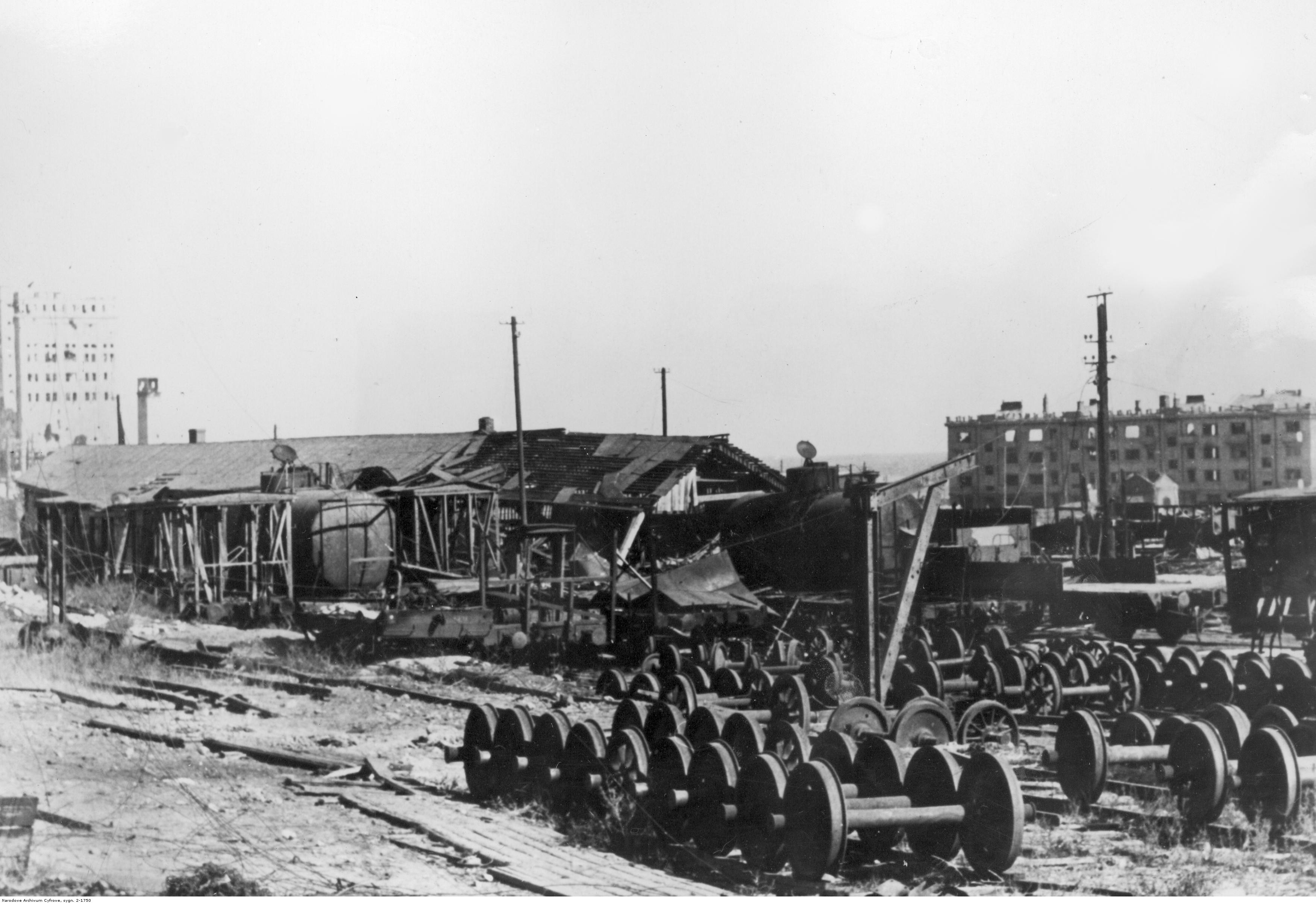
The remains of Stalingrad railway station in October 1942.

During the Second World War, the building was almost completely destroyed in the Battle of Stalingrad. In the period from July 1951 to May 1954 the new station building was erected on the site of the old building. The station commissioned June 2, 1954. In 1997 the building of the railway station was designated an architectural monument. In 2005, the station building was renovated for the 60th anniversary of Victory Day, the capitulation of Nazi Germany to the Soviet Union in the Second World War.

On December 29, 2013, the station was the site of a suicide bombing in which at least 16 people were killed. The station was re-opened after reconstruction on May 7, 2014, just in time for Victory Day holidays. The reopening featured ceremonies presided over by regional governor Andrey Bocharov and the Orthodox Church's Volgograd metropolitan bishop.

== Description ==
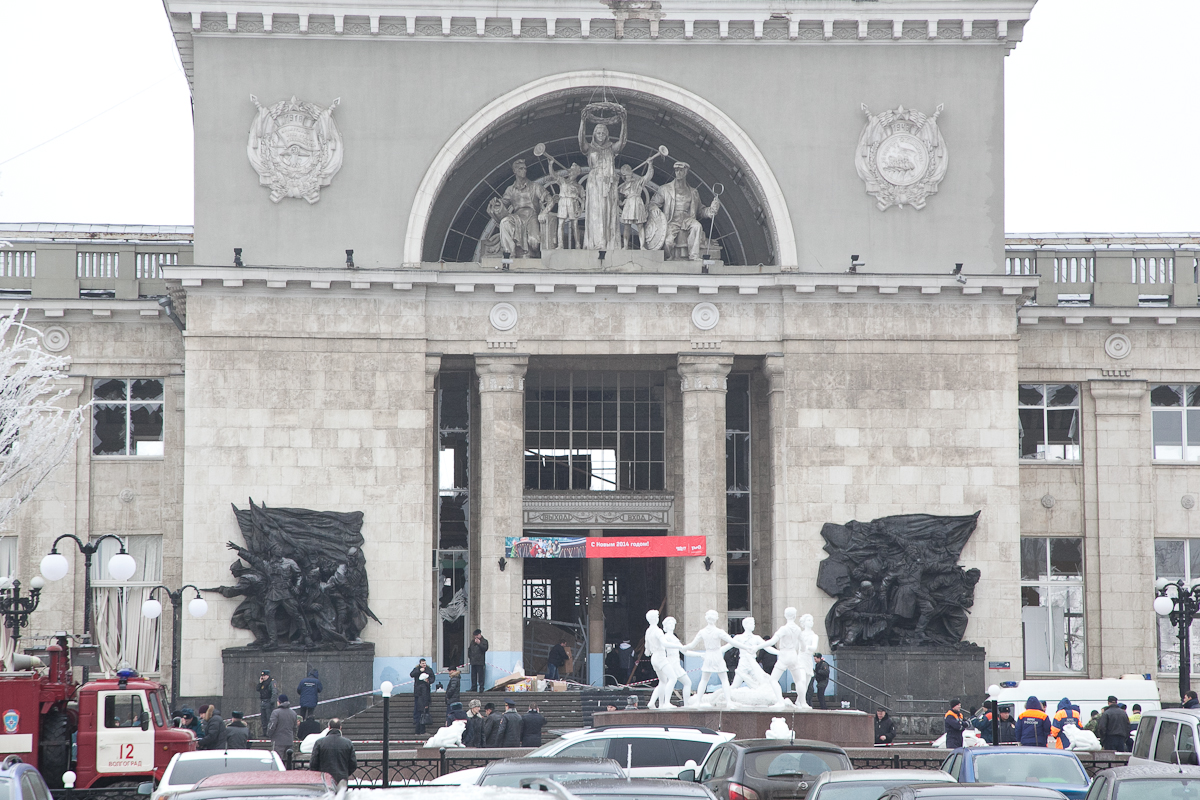
the station entrance, the "Apotheosis of Labour" and the replica of the Barmaley Fountain

The building is an example of the Stalinist architecture style, which was popular in Russia from the 1930s until Stalin's death in the 1950s. The station is a three-story building with a ground floor tower crowned with a spire. The building is made of a combination of brick and concrete, the facade consists of ornamented granite. The interior walls are mainly marble. The ceiling is decorated with stucco and several paintings of the battles that took place in the city.

Over the station entrance is a sculpture, the "Apotheosis of Labour", and in the Station Square (Privokzal'naya Ploshchad) there is a replica of the famous Barmaley Fountain.

== Trains ==
- Moscow — Volgograd
- Saratov — Adler
- Moscow — Baku
- St.Petersburg — Volgograd
- Adler — Krasnoyarsk
- Anapa — Krasnoyarsk
- Anapa — Tomsk

== See also ==
- Volgograd International Airport
