= List of Strawberry 100% chapters =

The cover of Strawberry 100% first volume as released by Viz Media on July 3, 2007, in North America

This is a list of chapters from the Strawberry 100% (いちご100%, Ichigo 100%) manga by author Mizuki Kawashita. The series was first serialized in the Japanese magazine Weekly Shōnen Jump from February 2002 to August 2005 then collected and published into nineteen bound volumes by publisher Shueisha. A twelve episode anime adaptation and several OVAs were produced by Madhouse and roughly covered the first eight volumes of the manga. The anime aired on Animax and TV Asahi from April 2005 to July 2005.

Licensing rights to the series were acquired by Viz Media which first published the series in Germany after partnering with publishing house Tokyopop. The series was later translated in English for a North America release with the first volume seeing shelves in July 2007.

== Volumes ==
No.	Title	Original release date	English release date
1	Strawberry Shortcake Alert!! Ichigo Chūihō (いちご注意報!!)	August 2, 2002; 978-4-08-873304-3	July 3, 2007; 978-1-4215-1371-3
001. "Strawberry Shortcake Alert!!" (いちご注意報!!, "Ichigo Chūihō"); 002. "What is Your Intention?" (そういうつもり?, "Sō Iu Tsumori?"); 003. "I'll Teach You" (教えてあげる, "Oshieteageru"); 004. "Two-Day Rule" (電話できないッ!!, "Denwa Dekinai!!"); 005. "Girl Meets Girl"; 006. "Public Defenestration" (鳥のように真中, "Tori no Yō ni Manaka"); 007. "Seven Minutes of...Heaven or Hell?" (密室ヘブンorヘル, "Masshitsu Hebun or Heru"); 008. "Early Morning Study Group of Lo-o-o-ve" (総長恋愛勉強会, "Sōchō Ren'ai Benkyōkai")
One day while heading to the school's roof to check the view of the city, middle school student Junpei Manaka encounters a mysterious young girl who abruptly runs away scared. Infatuated by the girl's beauty, Junpei doesn't know anything about her aside the notebook she left behind, and that she wears strawberry panties. As an aspiring movie director, he sets out determined to find out who the girl is so he can film her. However, the owner of the notebook – Aya Tojo – looks nothing like the girl he saw on the roof with her big glasses and conservative style. The two become friends after Junpei stumbles upon the novel that she was secretly writing in notebook. Convinced by his friends Komiyama and Okusa that the girl he saw was actually Tsukasa Nishino, one of prettiest and most popular girls in school, he confesses to her only to discover that she isn't the girl with the strawberry panties that he's looking for. Juggling a relationship with Tsukasa while still trying to look for his mystery girl will take all the energy he can muster.
2	The Reappearance of the Phantom Beauty!! Maboroshi no Bishōjo Futatabi!! (幻の美少女再び!!)	October 4, 2002; 978-4-08-873326-5	October 2, 2007; 978-1-4215-1372-0
009. "Suddenly on the Bed" (いきなりON THE BED, "Ikinari On the Bed"); 010. "Runaway Express Train Junpei" (暴走特急真中号, "Hōsō Tokkyū Manaka-gō"); 011. "The Best Possible Decision" (せいいっぱいの決意, "Seiippai no Ketsui"); 012. "Missing Each Other" (すれ違う想い, "Surechigau Omoi"); 013. "The Reappearance of the Phantom Beauty!!" (幻の美少女再び!!, "Maboroshi no Bishōjo Futatabi!!"); 014. "Aya x Aya = More Aya" (東城×東城=さらに東城, "Tōjō × Tōjō = Sara ni Tōjō"); 015. "That's Okay" (それでもいい, "Sore demo Ii"); 016. "Getaway for Two" (ふたりのESCAPE, "Futari no Escape"); 017. "Tsukasa's Way" (つかさSTYLE, "Tsukasa Style")
With high school entrance exams coming up Junpei is focused on getting into Izumizaka High because of its Film Club, yet his scores say otherwise. He gets help studying from Aya but his relationship with Tsukasa gets in the way of their friendship and the two have a temporary falling out. During the entrance exams Junpei is shocked to find out that Aya is actually the girl who he has been looking for all this time. Convinced that he loves Aya, breaking up with Tsukasa would be the best choice but he can't bring himself to do it. As the end of school season draws closer Aya breaks out of her conservative book-wormish style and instantly becomes popular among the boys. She gets rescued from all the attention by Junpei and the two further their friendship. Junpei finds out he's been waitlisted for Izumizaka while Tsukasa announces that she plans to go a different high school instead, leaving him to wonder where his relationship with the girls will lead to.
3	A Fateful Film Trip; Unmei no Kuranku In!? (運命のクランク·イン!?)	January 6, 2003; 978-4-08-873369-2	January 1, 2008; 978-1-4215-1476-5
018. "Thanks for the Memories" (思い出ください, "Omoide Kudasai"); 019. "A Fateful Film Trip" (運命のクランク·イン!?, "Unmei no Kuranku In!?"); 020. "Love Bloom at Diving Head" (恋の花咲くダイビングヘッド, "Koi no Hanasaku Daibingu Heddo"); 021. "A Better Man than Manaka" (真中以上の男, "Manaka Ijō no Otoko"); 022. "Mishap at the Gym" (体育館倉庫の乱, "Taiikukan Sōko no Ran"); 023. "Why Don't You Decide?" (決めちゃえよ, "Kimechae yo"); 024. "Is It Wrong to Love Her?" (好きで悪いか!?, "Suki de Warui ka!?"); 025. "Determined Girl / Indecisive Boy" (走る女·迷う男, "Hashiru Onna, Mayou Otoko"); 026. "Reunion" (再会, "Saikai")
Over break Junpei is excited after getting news that he's been moved from the waitlist to acceptance at Izumizaka as well as getting a brand new camcorder to start filming. While filming at the park he has a bad encounter with a girl that results in his camera getting destroyed. Again Junpei meets the girl – Satsuki Kitaoji- this time at the first day of classes. Sparks fly but they end up mending their differences and soon become good friends. He also makes a new friend in Sotomura, a classmate obsessed with taking pictures of cute girls, who also helps in restarting the Film Club. Junpei's relationship with Aya strains as the two find themselves in some compromising situations around school. His furthering friendship with Satsuki does not make things easier when she accidentally confesses to him. Tsukasa comes by Izumizaka with the intention of breaking up but can't bring herself to do it.
4	I Just Wanted to Be Kissed; Kisu Shite Hoshii (キスしてほしい)	April 4, 2003; 978-4-08-873412-5	April 1, 2008; 978-1-4215-1660-8
027. "The First Step to Making A Dream Come True" (夢への第一歩, "Yume e no Dai Ippo"); 028. "Aya in My Room" (東城 IN MY ROOM, "Tōjō In My Room"); 029. "Junpei Under Siege" (真中包囲網, "Manaka Hōi Mō"); 030. "The Film Trip Before the Storm" (嵐を呼ぶ撮影合宿, "Arashi o Yobu Satsuei Gasshuku"); 031. "Satsuki Boils Over!" (さつき沸騰中!!, "Satsuki Futtō Chū!!"); 032. "I Just Wanted to Be Kissed" (キスしてほしい, "Kisu Shite Hoshii"); 033. "Crying in the Rain"; 034. "Tsukasa's Wish" (つかさの望み, "Tsukasa no Nozomi"); 035. "I Love You, Junpei" (打ち明けられた想い, "Uchi Akerareta Omoi"); Strawberry 0~1%; Strawberry 2~3%; Strawberry 4~5%
The Film Club decides to make a movie for the upcoming School Festival and start preparing. Aya and Manaka finish a movie script which casts Satsuki and Komiyama as the leads. Over one of their breaks the Club goes on a trip to the seaside to start filming. The trip proves to be more focused on complicating things for Junpei, Satsuki, and Aya than actual filming. Satsuki takes matters into her own hands and tries to push herself onto Junpei but does not get the results she wanted. Meanwhile, Aya encounters some unexpected emotional troubles and Nishino starts to feel lonely with her birthday coming up soon. Indecisive and unsure of what to do about the girls, Junpei asks his friend Okusa for some advice: choose one and confess to her.
5	The Girl From My Memories; Omoide no Onna (思い出の女)	June 4, 2003; 978-4-08-873438-5	July 1, 2008; 978-1-4215-1661-5
036. "Secret Event" (秘密の出来事, "Himitsu no Dekigoto"); 037. "The Culture Festival Arrives Like a Storm" (嵐の如き文化祭, "Arashi no Gotoki Bunkasai"); 038. "A Kiss's Echo" (キスの余韻, "Kisu no Yoin"); 039. "That's Why, For Real This Time" (だから今度こそ, "Dakara Kondo koso"); 040. "The Girl From My Memories" (思い出の女, "Omoide no Onna"); 041. "We're Getting In Together?!" (一緒に入る!?, "Issho ni Hairu!?"); 042. "A Night Where Stars Fall?!" (星降る夜!?, "Hoshi Furu Yoru!?"); 043. "Teach Me – Please!" (教えてお願い!!, "Oshiete Onegai!!"); 044. "Outbreak of a War Between North and South?!" (南北戦争勃発, "Nanboku Sensō Boppatsu")
The day of the Cultural Festival arrives and the Film Club's movie becomes a big hit, most in part due to Satsuki's popularity. While the rest of the club attends to the viewers, Junpei spends time with Tsukasa. Wanting to take the lead to be Junpei's girlfriend after hearing about his unexpected close up with Aya, Satsuki takes action. Junpei starts being conscious of her, even more so when he gets a part-time job at a fast-food restaurant and finding out that she works there also. His life takes a couple of unexpected turns with Tsukasa deciding to break up with him and the introduction of another girl into his life, and home – childhood friend Yui Minamito.
6	The Angel Returns; Tenshi Sairin (天使再臨)	August 4, 2003; 978-4-08-873496-5	October 7, 2008; 978-1-4215-1662-2
045. "We'll Meet Again" (また会える, "Mata Aeru"); 046. "Is This Fate?!" (これぞ運命!?, "Korezo Unmei!?"); 047. "The Accidents Won't Stop!!" (アクシデントが止まらないッ!!, "Akushidento ga Tomaranai!!"); 048. "The Day of Fate" (2月14日, "Unmei no Hi"); 049. "The Angel Returns" (天使再臨, "Tenshi Sairin"); 050. "A Premonition" (予感, "Yokan"); 051. "Satsuki Counterattacks!" (さつき反撃!!, "Satsuki Hangeki!!"); 052. "After School Practice" (放課後プラクティス, "Hōkago Purakutisu"); 053. "Never Let Go" (放さない, "Hanasanai"); Omake. "Strawberry Ten Slash"
Manaka and the rest of the Film Club spend their last days with Yui before she returns home. With classes restarting Junpei looks forward to more time with Aya and the Film Club. In his way, however, is the new transfer student gets – Amachi – who takes no time in outwardly confessing to Aya after having met her earlier on a fated encounter. Determined not to lose Aya to his advances, Junpei asks her out on a date but a number of events and accidents prevents him from showing up on time. Satsuki, equally determined to break their relationship apart, takes action which backfires and leads to a falling out between her and Junpei. The arrival of Valentine's Day and a mistaken exchange of chocolate gifts restores their friendship. With everything back on track Satsuki takes drastic measures to ensure that she becomes Junpei's one and only.
7	Sweet Little Sister	October 3, 2003; 978-4-08-873518-4	January 6, 2009; 978-1-4215-1663-9
054. "Dash Junpei" (DASH 淳平!!, "Dash Junpei!!"); 055. "Point of Connection" (接点, "Setten"); 056. "The Girl at the Theatres" (映画館の女, "Eigakan no Onna"); 057. "Sweet Little Sister"; 058. "New Club Member!" (新入部員参上!!, "Shinnyūbu In Sanjō!!"); 059. "Messiah, Once More" (救世主アゲイン, "Meshia Agein"); 060. "I want to Protect You!" (君を守りたい, "Kimi o Mamoritai"); 061. "The Tear of Izumizaka Theatre" (涙のテアトル泉坂, "Namida no Teatoru Izumizaka"); 062. "The Last Snapshot" (最後の一枚, "Saigo no Ichimai")
Aya asks Junpei to go on a date with her over Spring Break. His joy is cut short with the return of Yui at his house and the announcement that she will be staying with them all through her starting high school career, the same all-girl's academy as Tsukasa. The two go and pick up chocolates for White Day where they cross paths with Tsukasa. The identities of the mixed up chocolate from Valentine's Day is revealed causing Junpei to panic. The day of his date with Aya arrives and everything goes well enough. The start of school brings a new challenge to the Film Club as Sotomura introduces a new member, his younger sister – Misuzu, a girl with no tolerance for their antics. Tsukasa helps Junpei escape from her high school after he gets trapped inside when trying to help Yui by returning a notebook for her. Their time together makes Junpei think about Tsukasa even more but with Satsuki's birthday approaching he has to refocus his attention elsewhere.
8	Warming One Another Up? Atatameau? (温めあう?)	December 4, 2003; 978-4-08-873537-5	April 7, 2009; 978-1-4215-2439-9
063. "A Swaying Birthday" (揺れてBIRTHDAY, "Yurete Birthday"); 064. "The Doors of Fate" (運命の扉, "Unmei no Tobira"); 065. "Believe in Yourself" (自分を信じて, "Jibun o Shinjite"); 066. "All OK!!" (オールOK!!, "Ōru OK!!"); 067. "The Other Boarding House" (もうひちつの合宿, "Mō Hitotsu no Gasshuku"); 068. "Warming One Another Up?" (温めあう?, "Atatameau?"); 069. "Did That Make Your Heart Pound?" (ドキッとした?, "Doki Toshita?"); 070. "The Legend of the Lovers" (恋人たちの伝説, "Koibito-tachi no Densetsu"); 071. "Come Pick Me Up!!" (迎えにきて!!, "Mukae ni Kite!!")
Junpei's birthday arrives and he receives a gift from Satsuki but turns it down after making the decision that it would be unfair to her if he kept accepting her kindness. Though still unsure of what to do about her, Junpei focuses on the Club's second film after Aya finalizes the script. After meeting Tsukasa and finding out that she works at a cake shop nearby his new work at a cinema, Misuzu and Junpei make the decision that she will be heroine for their new film. The Film Club go out-of-town to Amachi's rural residence to start filming. Junpei and Aya get trapped alone in a shed by a passing storm and spend some time together. Tsukasa becomes more aware of Aya and Junpei getting closer which she starts to bring up with him during the "Test of Courage", a late night activity devised by Sotomura. The Film Club returns home but Junpei has little time to think about the girls or the movie when he receives a letter from Yui asking for help.
9	The Wandering Lamb and the Deity who Found It; Mayoeru Kohitsuji to Hirou Kami (迷える子羊と拾う神)	March 4, 2004; 978-4-08-873577-1	July 7, 2009; 978-1-4215-2440-5
072. "The Final Night" (最後の夜, "Saigo no Yoru"); 073. "Yui's Hero" (唯の味方, "Yui no Hīrō"); 074. "Lesson in a Swimsuit!" (水着で個人指導, "Mizugi de Ressun"); 075. "A Man Sweeter than Any Other" (誰よりも甘い男, "Dare Yori mo Amai Otoko"); 076. "The Wandering Lamb and the Deity who Found It" (迷える子羊と拾う神, "Mayoeru Kohitsuji to Hirou Kami"); 077. "Embrace" (抱擁, "Hōyō"); 078. "Birthday, Again" (誕生日アゲイン, "Tanjōbi Agein"); 079. "Birthday Panic"; 080. "At the School Building of Our Memories..." (思い出の校舎で, "Omoide no Kōsha de"); Omake
A fight between Yui and her father about her living situation ends up with Junpei and Yui running away. The two stay at a hotel for the night where they get a chance to talk. The family makes up afterwards with Yui deciding to live on her own. Junpei and Tsukasa start spending time together, but the famous grandson of the cake shop's owner causes him to doubt his compatibility with her. He meets Aya by chance who cheers him up and makes him feel more drawn to her. Wanting to dismiss any misconceptions between her and the grandson Tsukasa shows Junpei that she still cares for him. Junpei and Satsuki plan to go to a concert together, but he makes the mistake of accepting an invitation from Aya on the same day. To make matters worse, Tsukasa's birthday is on the same day as well.
10	Embrace in the Underworld; Daite Andāwārudo (抱いてアンダーワールド)	April 30, 2005; 978-4-08-873597-9	October 6, 2009; 978-1-4215-2441-2
081. Wonderful Tonight; 082. "Festival Panic!!" (文化祭パニック!!, "Bunkasai Panikku!!"); 083. "The Fourth Angel" (第4の天使, "Dai 4 no Tenshi"); 084. "Chinami Fever" (ちなみFEVER, "Chinami Fever"); 085. "Sudden Turn!!" (急·転·直·下!!, "Kyūten Chokka!!"); 086. "To the Other Side of the Steam" (湯けむりの向こう側へ, "Yukemuri no Mukōgawa e"); 087. "Love Intersection" (恋愛交差点, "Ren'ai Kōsaten"); 088. "I Only Want to See You" (ただ君に会いたい, "Tada Kimi ni Aitai"); 089. "Embrace in the Underworld" (抱いてアンダーワールド, "Daite Andāwārudo")
Tsukasa and Junpei break into their old middle school late at night and end up alone in the Nurses office. The start of the School Festival brings trouble for the Film Club. Junpei finds himself in a situation when a young girl – Chinami Hashimoto – runs into him while being chased by a guy. Satsuki and Aya end up getting preoccupied leaving the Club understaffed for handling the movie. Chinami fills in but proves to be more trouble than help in the end. The class heads to Nara for their school trip. Satsuki once again tries to make a move. Aya gets lost in Kyoto prompting Junpei to head out and find her. Tsukasa sees Aya and Junpei together which causes a misunderstanding. In order to clear things up Junpei goes out to see her and they plan a date for the last day of the trip.
11	The Feelings that Reached Him, and the Thoughts that Didn't; Todoku Kimochi, Todokanu Omoi (届く気持ち 届かぬ想い)	July 2, 2004; 978-4-08-873629-7	January 5, 2010; 978-1-4215-2869-4
090. "Lots of Santas!!" (サンタクロースがいっぱい!!, "Santa Kurōsu ga Ippai!!"); 091. "Wanna Touch Them?" (触ってみる?, "Sawatte Miru?"); 092. "Number One!" (ナンバー1, "Nanbā 1"); 093. "Satsuki, Time Limit!" (さつきタイムリミット!!, "Satsuki Taimu Rimitto!!"); 094. "The Feelings that Reached Him, and the Thoughts that Didn't" (届く気持ち 届かぬ想い, "Todoku Kimochi, Todokanu Omoi"); 095. "Sweet Girl Bitter Love"; 096. "Love's Firing Range" (恋愛射程距離, "Ren'ai Shatei Kyori"); 097. "The Girl who Came In Late" (遅れて来た女, "Okurete Kita Onna"); 098. "Staying Like This Forever..." (このままずっと, "Kono Mama Zutto")
To raise money for an old movie theater, the boys dress up as Santa and holding a bake sale. But when the girls dress up as Santa's helpers, the situation gets out of hand at all. Junpei wants to be the first to make a birthday gift for Aya, but if you have to deal with the usual Amachi. Satsuki's parents seem on the verge of divorce, so she will have to leave school. All friends give her a tearful goodbye, but in the end everything works out for the best and Satsuki can be with his friends and Junpei. On Valentine's Day, all the girls give chocolate to Junkei, but he expects especially that of Tsukasa. The girl tells him she wants to go to Paris the following year to become a great pastry chef, Junpei and encourages her even though he has no intention of losing her. Later on, while double-dating at an amusement park with Yui and Okusa, Junpei and Tsukasa take inadvertently their relationship to new heights.
12	The Over-imaginative Girl; Mōsō Shōjo (妄想少女)	September 3, 2004; 978-4-08-873650-1	April 6, 2010; 978-1-4215-2870-0
099. "Don't Let Go of Me" (放さないで, "Hanasanaide"); 100. "The Ignition of Fate" (走り出した運命, "Hashiridashita Unmei"); 101. "This Place is a Wonderland" (ここは別世界, "Koko wa Bessekai"); 102. "The Over-imaginative Girl" (妄想少女, "Mōsō Shōjo"); 103. "Smile For Me"; 104. "A Romance Movie Crossing" (純情シネマ交差点, "Junjō Shinema Kōsaten"); 105. "The Idea of a Frantic Chase" (追いかけてトゥナイト, "Oikakete Tunaito"); 106. "Under The Moonlight"; 107. "The Alarm Clock Girl" (目覚ましGIRL, "Mezamashi Girl"); "Strawberry 6~7%"
After their date at the lunapark, Tsukasa reveals Okusa that she still feels something for Junpei, but she's afraid of being left again, so she doesn't want to reveal to him her true feelings. After discovering that Aya attends the after-school program, also Junpei decides to go there to improve his grades and clarify things for the university. There, the guy meets Kozue, a young girl who is very shy in front of the guys but at the same time has "special" dreams about men. Between the two begins to develop a relationship of trust, especially after an accident at night in a park where even Satsuki is involuntary protagonist. Tsukasa, after discovering that Junpei attends the after-school program, invites him to come out a little to relax and forget for a moment his studies.
13	The Girl's Scandal; Ano Ko no Sukyandaru (あの娘のスキャンダル)	November 4, 2004; 978-4-08-873669-3	July 6, 2010; 978-1-4215-2871-7
108. "Amachi Awakens" (天地覚醒, "Amachi Kakusei"); 109. "Two Predictions" (二つの予言, "Futatsu no Yogen"); 110. "Love's Allied Warfront" (恋の共同戦線, "Koi no Kyōdō Sensen"); 111. "Sleepless Night"; 112. "Sleeping Faces: Give & Take" (寝顔GIVE&TAKE, "Negao Give & Take"); 113. "Distant Voices"; 114. "Words of Oath" (誓いの言葉, "Chikai no Kotoba"); 115. "The See-Through Rainy Day" (RAINY見えすぎて, "Rainy Miesugite"); 116. "The Girl's Scandal" (あの娘のスキャンダル, "Ano Ko no Sukyandaru"); "Strawberry 8~9%"
Amachi decides to keep away from him all his admirers and woo only Aya, who seems to give in, even though deep down she keeps thinking about Junpei. Kozue also has a crush on the boy, and her friend Mai decides to combine the two, asking for help even at Aya. Tsukasa remains one evening to sleep in the bed of Junpei, but the next day she receives a request from the owner of the bakery: she wants her to marry her nephew Higure. Satsuki makes one last attempt with Junpei, but she realizes that the boy does not return her feelings and decides that from now on they will just be friends. The news of the marriage of Tsukasa, even if false, spreads quickly, and she must defend from some of her admirers too bold.
14	Our First...!? Hajimete no...!? (初めての...!?)	January 5, 2005; 978-4-08-873695-2	October 5, 2010; 978-1-4215-2872-4
117. "Dream Come True" (DREAM重なって, "Dream Kasanatte"); 118. "Our First...!?" (初めての...!?, "Hajimete no...!?"); 119. ""Something" Happened" (○○○なっちゃった, "___ Natchatta"); 120. "Dress-Up Heroines" (着せ替えヒロインズ, "Kisekae Hiroinzu"); 121. "Heart, Breast, Sandwich" (心、胸、サンドイッチ, "Kokoro, Mune, Sandoitchi"); 122. "Two on a Train" (ふたりで電車で, "Futari de Densha de"); 123. "First Day"; 124. "Second Night"; 125. "Midnight"; "Strawberry 10~11"; Character Profiles
Tsukasa tells Junpei that the engagement was invented by the owner of the bakery, and she respects too much Higure to see him as her future husband. Kozue is invited to the movies by Junpei, at the suggestion of Mai and Aya, and declares the boy to be in love with him. On pressure of Sotomura, Aya writes the script for the third film, but the group is undecided on who will be the star: many of them want to own Aya, but also Kozue seems to fit the part. Suddenly, Tsukasa invites Junpei to spend three days alone away from it all and better reflect on her choices for the future. The two spend a good time in the city where she grew up as a child, and in the end she kisses him on the cheek, and she hopes to be again his girlfriend one day.
15	SOS with a Flower on Each Hand; Ryōte ni Hana de SOS (両手に花でSOS)	April 4, 2005; 978-4-08-873793-5	—
126. "Swimming for Who" (誰がために泳ぐ, "Ta ga Tame ni Oyogu"); 127. "Gather Together for the Summer Trip" (全員集合夏合宿!, "Zen'in Shūgō Natsu Gasshuku!"); 128. "The Great Steamy Escape" (湯けむり大脱出, "Yukemuri Dai Dasshutsu"); 129. "Just Friends or...!?" (トモダチ!?それでも..., "Tomodachi!? Sore demo..."); 130. "Komiyama Rikiya's Miracle" (小宮山力也の奇跡, "Komiyama Rikiya no Kiseki"); 131. "In the Darkness" (IN THE 暗闇, "In The Kurayami"); 132. "SOS with a Flower on Each Hand" (両手に花でSOS, "Ryōte ni Hana de SOS"); 133. "Which!?" (どっち!?, "Dotchi!?"); 134. "If the Wind Were to Blow..." (風が吹いたら, "Kaze ga Fuitara"); "Strawberry 12~13%"
After some hesitations, Aya decides to accept the lead role in the film. The group moves to a large country house owned by Amachi for the shoot, and Satsuki takes the opportunity to put Junpei one last time to the test. During filming, Komiyama is able to conquer, surprisingly, the heart of Chinami, who becomes his girlfriend. Due to a blackout, Aya and Junpei casually exchange a kiss, Kozue sees them and suffers because she is in love with Junpei too, but an adventure on an island the next day puts things right. To complete the film lacks a single scene, in which the protagonist (Aya) must declare her love to his servant (Junpei).
16	Adult-Flavored Kiss; Kiss Otona Aji (KISS 大人味)	June 3, 2005; 978-4-08-873818-5	—
135. "Scene 122"; 136. "Acting or Truth!?" (演技!?本気!?, "Enki!? Honki!?"); 137. "Feel That Way For Me" (気になって その気になって, "Ki ni Natte, Sono Ki ni Natte"); 138. "Date ×4" (デート×4, "Dēto × 4"); 139. "Eat!"; 140. "Adult-Flavored Kiss" (KISS 大人味, "Kiss Otona Aji"); 141. "The Thing I Really Want" (ホントに欲しいモノ, "Honto ni Hoshii Mono"); 142. "Destiny!? Flashback" (運命!?FLASH BACK, "Unmei!? Flash Back"); 143. "Leaning Feelings... Chaos" (傾く気持ち...混乱, "Katamuku Kimochi... Konran")
Aya tells Junpei that she does not want to go into the same university with him as promised before, and during the last scene of the film she says that he loves him. The boy doesn't know whether it is fiction or if it is a true confession from her. Just got home, Junpei founds Yui and Tsukasa waiting for him, and he is involved in a tragic multiple appointment with the two girls, Aya and Satsuki. During preparations for the school festival, Satsuki returns once again to the attack with Junpei, saying she wants a kiss "as adults do," but in the end she can't do it, and so she invites him to accompany her to a sanctuary for lovers ... to give him the rest! Junpei has a date with Tsukasa at the aquarium to celebrate the birthday of the girl, but she doesn't feel at ease in the midst of many happy couples, so she runs away. In a park, Tsukasa finds the strength to confess to Junpei that she still loves him, using the bar just as the boy had done with her three years before, and also says she will wait until the school festival for a response. The whole school is in turmoil for the visit of the sanctuary for couples in love, and the news that Aya has a secret companion upsets Amachi and, above all, Junpei.
17	You Can Take Advantage of Me... Amaete Ii yo... (甘えていいよ...)	August 4, 2005; 978-4-08-873843-7	—
144. "You Can Take Advantage of Me..." (甘えていいよ..., "Amaete Ii yo..."); 145. "Greedy Lips" (欲張りな唇, "Yokubari na Kuchibiru"); 146. "Crisis of Two" (ふたりきりクライシス!, "Futarikiri Kuraishisu!"); 147. "I Like You, But..." (大切だけど そうじゃない, "Taisetsu Dakedo Sō Ja Nai"); 148. "The After-school of Wanting Each Other" (求めあう放課後, "Motomeau Hōkago"); 149. "A Shabby Shard" (儚き結晶, "Hakanaki Kesshō"); 150. "I Want You to Notice" (気づいてほしい!, "Kizuite Hoshii!"); 151. "Why..." (どうして...?, "Dōshite...?"); 152. "Love Drive"; "Strawberry 14~15%"
Troubled by what he believes to have discovered on Aya and for poor school performance, Junpei finds comfort in the arms of Tsukasa. For the first time, the two kiss, and are officially back together, but for the boy now comes the most difficult moment: to reveal his choice to the other girls. Satsuki suffers a lot when she discovers his decision, but maintains a little hope to conquer him. Aya discovers the news just before the festival, and also for her is a blow. During the cultural festival, anything goes: Chinami breaks with Komiyama, Kozue realizes she doesn't have hopes with Junpei, Junpei finds out that the guy who is together with Aya is actually his brother and Tsukasa, after seeing the love scene in the film between the two, is upset and afraid of losing her boyfriend once again. When everything is finished, Aya finally finds the strength to reveal to Junpei that she loves him since middle school.
18	Just the Two of Us; Futarikiri (ふたりきり)	October 4, 2005; 978-4-08-873863-5	—
153. "Even Though I Knew" (わかってたのに, "Wakatteta no ni"); 154. "She Lied" (嘘ついた, "Uso Tsuita"); 155. "The Visitor Called 'The Future'" (未来という名の来訪者, "Mirai to Iu Na no Raihōsha"); 156. "A Chance Arrives" (好機到来!, "Chansu Tōrai!"); 157. "Something Lacking!?" (何かが足りない!?, "Nanika ga Tarinai!?"); 158. "Motivation!"; 159. "If We Were Lovers" (恋人ならば, "Koibito Naraba"); 160. "Everyone's Christmas Eve" (それぞれの聖なる夜, "Sorezore no Kurisumasu Ibu"); 161. "Just the Two of Us" (ふたりきり, "Futarikiri")
Junpei thanks Aya for her confession, even though in his heart he always knew that she loved him, but confirms of wanting to be with Tsukasa. In the evening, the boy goes, almost by chance, to find Tsukasa, and the two spend their first night together. Both Aya that Junpei come major awards: the first win a major literary prize and is contacted by a major publishing house, that recommends her at a prestigious university, the second is contacted by the director who won the summer festival years ago, impressed from his latest film. The two guys, however, are experiencing a period of creative crisis, and only mutual consolation helps them to find inspiration. Junpei, taken from the studies and the desire to break into the world of cinema, neglects Tsukasa, and the girl suffers because in the new year she will leave for Paris, as planned for some time. To help Junpei during his studies, Yui calls Aya, and she took advantage of a moment when they are alone in the house to pass a last moment of happiness with the boy she loves.
19	The Future We Choose; Eranda Shinario (選んだ未来)	December 2, 2005; 978-4-08-873884-0	—
162. "The Decisive Confrontation of the Previous Night!" (決戦前夜!, "Kessen Zen'ya!"); 163. "From Me" (あたしから, "Atashi kara"); 164. "The Notebook From That Day" (あの日のノート, "Ano Hi no Nōto"); 165. "Before the Trip" (旅立つまで, "Tabidatsu Made"); 166. "Goodbye, Izumizaka" (さようなら.泉坂, "Sayōnara, Izumizaka"); 167. "The Future We Choose" (選んだ未来, "Eranda Shinario"); Extra. "First Love in Kyoto" (京都初恋物語, "Kyōto Hatsukoi Monogatari"); "Strawberry 16~17%"; "Strawberry 18~19%"; Author's Notes
Yui surprises Junpei and Aya together, and before exams scold the boy for his indecision and because it risks hurting the two people that he loves the most, Aya and Tsukasa. For this, just finished the tests Junpei finally takes the decision to raise the two girls one at a time. The first is Aya, who is happy to have fallen in love with him, thanks him for all good memories he has given her over the years, and eventually she sends the notebook to his house with her first novel, what she had written in junior high, and that is now finished. After reading the story, Junpei compares with Tsukasa: he says that, as long as she will be in Paris, the two of them will stay together anymore, so he can grow as a man and become worthy of her when she returns. Tsukasa leaves, the guys leave high school, and Junpei gives up university to find a job, and still cultivate his passion for cinema. Years later, the group meets and everyone tells what was his future.
