= Siren of Blue Youth =

Japanese manga series by Mikan Momokuri

- First tankōbon volume cover

群青にサイレン (Gunjō ni Sairen)
- Genre: Sports
- Manga
- Written by: Mikan Momokuri
- Published by: Shueisha
- English publisher: Shueisha (digital)
- Imprint: Margaret Comics You (vol. 1–9); Margaret Comics Jump Plus (vol. 10–12)
- Magazine: You (2015–2018); Shōnen Jump+ (2019–2020)
- Original run: July 15, 2015 – August 3, 2020
- Volumes: 12
- icon

Siren of Blue Youth (Japanese: 群青にサイレン, Hepburn: Gunjō ni Sairen; lit. 'Ultramarine Siren') is a Japanese manga series written and illustrated by Mikan Momokuri. It was serialized in Shueisha's josei manga magazine You from July 2015 to October 2018, until the magazine ceased its publication. It was later serialized on Shueisha's online platform Shōnen Jump+ from February 2019 to August 2020. Its chapters were collected in 12 tankōbon volumes.

== Publication ==
Written and illustrated by Mikan Momokuri, Siren of Blue Youth was serialized in serialized in Shueisha's josei manga magazine You from July 15, 2015, to October 15, 2018, until the magazine ceased its publication. It was later serialized on Shueisha's online platform Shōnen Jump+ from February 2, 2019, to August 3, 2020. Shueisha collected its chapters in 12 tankōbon volumes, released from November 25, 2020, to October 2, 2020.

Shueisha began publishing the manga in English on its Manga Million digital platform in 2026.

=== Volumes ===
No.	Japanese release date	Japanese ISBN
1	November 25, 2015	978-4-08-845492-4
2	March 25, 2016	978-4-08-845549-5
3	July 25, 2016	978-4-08-845617-1
4	January 25, 2017	978-4-08-845713-0
5	April 25, 2017	978-4-08-845756-7
6	October 25, 2017	978-4-08-845848-9
7	March 23, 2018	978-4-08-844016-3
8	July 25, 2018	978-4-08-844074-3
9	November 22, 2018	978-4-08-844130-6
10	August 2, 2019	978-4-08-844229-7
11	March 4, 2020	978-4-08-844335-5
12	October 2, 2020	978-4-08-844395-9

== Reception ==
The series ranked third on AnimeJapan's "Most Wanted Anime Adaptation" poll in 2019.
