= First Love Limited =

Japanese manga series

- First tankōbon volume cover, featuring Ayumi Arihara

初恋限定。 (Hatsukoi Rimiteddo)
- Genre: Romantic comedy
- Manga
- Written by: Mizuki Kawashita
- Published by: Shueisha
- Imprint: Jump Comics
- Magazine: Weekly Shōnen Jump
- Original run: October 1, 2007 – May 26, 2008
- Volumes: 4
- Anime television series
- Directed by: Yoshiki Yamakawa
- Written by: Mariko Kunisawa
- Music by: Nijine
- Studio: J.C.Staff
- Licensed by: NA: Sentai Filmworks
- Original network: BS11 Digital
- Original run: April 11, 2009 – June 27, 2009
- Episodes: 12
- Light novel

Shōsetsu Hatsukoi Limited. Winter Photography
- Written by: Sawako Hirabayashi
- Illustrated by: Mare Kawagesui
- Published by: Shueisha
- Published: March 23, 2009
- Volumes: 1
- icon

First Love Limited (Japanese: 初恋限定。, Hepburn: Hatsukoi Rimiteddo), also known as Hatsukoi Limited, is a Japanese manga series written and illustrated by Mizuki Kawashita. It was serialized in Shueisha's shōnen manga magazine Weekly Shōnen Jump from October 2007 to May 2008, with its chapters collected in four tankōbon volumes. The series depicts vignettes in the love lives of eight girls in middle school and high school.

A drama CD adaptation was released in February 2009, and a light novel in March of that same year. A 12-episode anime television series adaptation produced by J.C.Staff was broadcast from April to June 2009.

== Plot ==
The manga features a series of short stories about eight girls in middle school and high school, plus their classmates and relatives. Each chapter focuses on a different main character. These stories are intertwined and eventually lead to a main story involving most of the cast. A series relating the intertwined stories about the "first loves" of several middle-schoolers and high-schoolers. Each episode tends to focus on a different character, however the developments established during previous episodes continue to play smaller roles in those following. As the series progresses, an array of unusual and unexpected love webs begin to blossom.

== Characters ==
=== Middle school students ===
Ayumi Arihara (有原あゆみ, Arihara Ayumi)
Voiced by: Mariya Ise
A second-year middle school student, she initially agrees to date Misao Zaitsu but remains unsettled by his monstrous appearance. Despite this, she displays both compassion and cunning. After Mamoru Zaitsu, Misao's younger brother, carries her to the infirmary in a way that resembles a fairy-tale prince, she develops feelings for him. She hesitates between Misao, who is devoted to her, and Mamoru, whom she admires. She ultimately rejects Misao, unwilling to abandon her feelings for Mamoru.
Kei Enomoto (江ノ本慧, Enomoto Kei)
Voiced by: Shizuka Itou
Kei, one of Ayumi's classmates and friends, attracts frequent romantic attention due to her mature appearance and early physical development. She dismisses such advances as burdensome, viewing confessions as meaningless without mutual feelings. Though she openly prioritizes looks in relationships, she maintains a contentious, often hostile dynamic with Etsu Kusuda, vehemently denying any attraction to him. However, when he confesses his feelings, she reciprocates. By the series' conclusion, she abandons her superficial criteria, embracing inner beauty as the foundation for romance—a shift that astonishes her peers, particularly Rika, who finds the change uncharacteristic.
Koyoi Bessho (別所小宵, Bessho Koyoi)
Voiced by: Aki Toyosaki
Koyoi, another of Ayumi's friends and classmates, openly displays a brother complex toward her sibling Yoshihiko, much to his discomfort. When Misao begins spending time with their group, she and Nao Chikura temporarily stop accompanying Ayumi on their walks home. Koyoi views Misaki—the popular girl Yoshihiko admires—as a rival, even referring to her as a "final boss" to overcome. She notably describes Misaki's physical attractiveness as a "truly evil power."
Rika Dobashi (土橋りか, Dobashi Rika)
Voiced by: Minako Kotobuki
Rika, known as "Doba-chan" to close friends, presents as the group's most level-headed member while frequently engaging in playful teasing. A naturally athletic tomboy with a domineering personality, she shares the same grade as Ayumi. Her friendship with tennis player Haruto Terai develops during their joint training sessions, gradually evolving into romantic attraction. Initially unaware of her own feelings, she gains clarity after Kei explains male perspectives to her. Rika subsequently surprises Haruto with a kiss and openly expresses her attachment—following an incident where several boys ran away, she declares she would "absolutely not accept it" if Haruto did the same.
Nao Chikura (千倉名央, Chikura Nao)
Voiced by: Ayumi Fujimura
Nao, another of Ayumi's classmates and friends, initially resents the attention Kei receives. Like Koyoi, she temporarily avoids walking home with Ayumi due to her fear of Misao. As an art club member, she develops admiration for painter Renjou Yukito after encountering his sakura tree artwork. When Yukito graduates and leaves Japan, the departure leaves her heartbroken. She later grows closer to Hiroyuki Sogabe after learning of his feelings for her, though subtle indications suggest she may retain unresolved feelings for Yukito.
Mamoru Zaitsu (財津衛, Zaitsu Mamoru)
Voiced by: Miyu Irino
A cheerful aspiring paramedic, Mamoru quickly earns Ayumi's affection when he helps her to the nurse's office. Though they share the same class, Ayumi only recognizes him as Misao's younger brother a day after meeting Misao. Mamoru finds Ayumi unexpectedly intimidating despite her demeanor. His romantic interest lies with neighbor Misaki Yamamoto, who views him as a younger brother. After Misaki rejects him, he joins Kusuda and Sogabe in running away. The experience leads to personal growth when he recognizes how his actions hurt Ayumi.
Etsu Kusuda (楠田悦, Kusuda Etsu)
Voiced by: Shintaro Asanuma
Etsu Kusuda, a short and unattractive friend of Mamoru's, possesses a crude sense of humor and often unintentionally bores girls to sleep with his weak puns. Though largely indifferent toward Ayumi—aside from a passing interest in seeing her in a cheerleader outfit—he develops an obsessive fascination with Misaki. Despite Kei's striking appearance, he remains unfazed and frequently clashes with her, their arguments fueled by his "Kappa-like" features and stubborn demeanor. Though he masks his true feelings, he harbors a growing affection for Kei. After impulsively declaring he hates her, he flees with Mamoru and Sogabe in regret. The conflict resolves when he confesses to Kei, who surprisingly returns his feelings.
Haruto Terai (寺井, Terai)
Voiced by: Nobuhiko Okamoto
Haruto Terai, a tennis club member with limited athletic skill, gradually improves through training with Rika Dobashi. During their sessions, he develops romantic feelings for her, though her teasing behavior and reluctance to hold hands—which she later admits stems from embarrassment—leave him uncertain about her feelings. Their relationship becomes clear when Dobashi unexpectedly kisses him.
Hiroyuki Sogabe (曽我部 弘之, Sogabe Hiroyuki)
Voiced by: Takahiro Sakurai
Hiroyuki Sogabe, a friend of Etsu Kusuda, displays narcissistic tendencies and often entertains unrealistic expectations about romance. He develops feelings for Nao Chikura but presumptuously waits for her to confess to him first. His insecurities surface when Nao shows interest in Yukito Renjou, a graduated artist from their school, prompting him to briefly run away with Kusuda and Mamoru. After openly declaring his feelings for Nao—loud enough for her to hear during the girls' pursuit—their relationship improves. Later in the series, he cuts his hair in an apparent effort to reform his appearance.
Soako Andou (安藤そあこ, Andō Soako)
Voiced by: Saori Goto
Soako is a second-year middle school student featured in bonus stories included at each volume's end in Hatsukoi Limited. Her story begins when arriving late to school without underwear, leading to various difficulties throughout the day. Later on, Mamoru Zaitsu assists her, prompting romantic feelings that distress Ayumi Hasekawa.
Sumire Fudounomiya (不動宮すみれ, Fudōnomiya Sumire)
Voiced by: Ayako Kawasumi
As the Theatre Club president, she is determined to create an outstanding production—her first since assuming leadership. She aggressively recruits Etsu Kusuda for his distinctive facial features, employing persistent tactics including leveraging her physical attractiveness to persuade him.

=== High school students ===
Misao Zaitsu (財津操, Zaitsu Misao)
Voiced by: Kenji Nomura
Misao Zaitsu has an intimidating appearance that frightens most people, though his childhood friend Misaki Yamamoto is unaffected. Despite his physical strength and frequent fights, he struggles with shyness—unable to verbally confess to Ayumi Hasekawa, he writes his feelings instead. He develops affection for Ayumi after seeing her in his brother Mamoru's class photo. When she admits fearing his appearance, he watches over her silently. Ayumi later acknowledges his sincerity but remains undecided between him and Mamoru.
Yuuji Arihara (有原有二, Arihara Yūji)
Voiced by: Hiroyuki Yoshino
Yuuji Hasekawa, Ayumi's older brother, displays rude and inconsiderate behavior toward his sister, often stealing her poorly-made baked goods and invading her privacy. These actions may stem from an unacknowledged sister complex. He shares his schoolmates' fear of Misao Zaitsu and is horrified by Ayumi's interest in him. When Misaki Yamamoto shows romantic interest in him, he initially questions her motives before eventually reciprocating her feelings.
Misaki Yamamoto (山本岬, Yamamoto Misaki)
Voiced by: Rie Tanaka
Misaki Yamamoto is a first-year high school student and childhood friend of the Zaitsu brothers. Known for her self-assured demeanor, she interacts comfortably with Mamoru and remains unaffected by Misao's intimidating presence. She demonstrates unexpected wrestling proficiency, often announcing techniques during spontaneous matches. Her relationship with Yuuji Arihara develops after an unconventional encounter, challenging her usual composure when confronting romantic feelings. As an only child, she forms a sisterly bond with Yuuji's sibling Ayumi.
Yuu Enomoto (江ノ本夕, Enomoto Yū)
Voiced by: Satomi Sato
Yuu, Kei's older sister, maintains close friendships with Meguru and Misaki. Outgoing and sociable, she readily befriends others despite frequent male attention. Though seemingly absent-minded, her broad curiosity makes her surprisingly knowledgeable. Her youthful appearance—smaller stature and innocent demeanor—often causes her to look younger than Kei.
Meguru Watase (渡瀬めぐる, Watase Meguru)
Voiced by: Ryoko Shiraishi
Meguru is a close friend of Misaki and Yuu. A former national swimming champion in middle school and Olympic reserve candidate, she abandons competitive swimming upon entering high school due to self-consciousness about her developing physique. She initially attempts to conceal her body before her friends encourage her to embrace it. While secretly attracted to teammate Gengorou Takei—one of the few not fixated on her appearance—she rejoins swimming as team manager to prevent the club's dissolution. With Takei's encouragement, she eventually resumes competing.
Uemura (上村)
A classmate of Misaki and Yuu, he has aspired to become a manga artist since childhood. While developing a story using Yuu as inspiration, she accidentally discovers his ambition and becomes his primary supporter. His focus gradually shifts from manga creation to pursuing a romantic relationship with her, though he continues facing both artistic challenges and rivals for her attention.
Yoshihiko Bessho (別所良彦, Bessho Yoshihiko)
Voiced by: Satoshi Hino
Yoshihiko Bessho is Koyoi's older brother and a first-year high school student. While Koyoi displays excessive affection toward him, he finds this attention bothersome. He harbors feelings for Misaki Yamamoto, who instead favors his friend Yuuji Arihara. Despite this, they maintain a friendly relationship, with Misaki often confiding in him about Arihara.
Kazuma Chikura (千倉一真, Chikura Kazuma)
Nao's older brother shares classes with Yoshihiko Bessho and Yuuji Arihara. Though rarely central to events, he appears moderately popular among female classmates. He finds it troublesome that his sister and her friends (Yoshihiko and Yuuji's younger sisters) frequently cause mischief together.
Gengorou Takei (武居源五郎, Takei Gengorō)
Voiced by: Kazuya Nakai
Gengorou Takei, Meguru's upperclassman and childhood swimming companion, persistently encourages her to rejoin competitive swimming. After losing a backstroke challenge intended to recruit her, he ultimately convinces her by confessing his romantic feelings rather than just valuing her athletic ability. His efforts successfully restore Meguru to the team.
Yukito Renjou (連城由紀人, Renjō Yukito)
Voiced by: Akira Ishida
A former student at Nao Chikura's middle school, now in his final year at the prestigious Kaitei High School. As the creator of the sakura painting that inspired Nao, he forms a connection with her when she discovers his identity. Upon graduation, he departs for overseas volunteer work without notice, leaving only a letter of gratitude and a painting featuring Nao.
Nanoka Kyuuma (久間菜の花, Kyūma Nanoka)
Voiced by: Sayuri Yahagi
Nanoka, a first-year high school student, has considered Meguru her swimming rival since middle school. Despite her petite stature—often mistaken for an elementary student—she defeats Meguru in a race, temporarily shaking Meguru's confidence. This encounter ultimately helps motivate Meguru's return to competitive swimming. Nanoka dislikes the nickname "Kyu-chan" that Meguru insists on using.

== Media ==
=== Manga ===
Written and illustrated by Mizuki Kawashita, Hatsukoi Limited was serialized in Shueisha's shōnen manga magazine Weekly Shōnen Jump from October 1, 2007, to May 26, 2008. The 32 chapters were collected in four tankōbon volumes, released from February 4 to September 4, 2008.

==== Volumes ====
No.	Title	Release date	ISBN
1	Beautiful Girl "A" and Monster "Z"; Bishōjo A to yajū Z (美少女Aと野獣Z)	February 4, 2008	978-4-08-874482-7
01. Beautiful Girl "A" and Monster "Z" (美少女Aと野獣Z, Bishōjo A to Yajū Z); 02. Yamamoto-san From Nextdoor (となりの山本さん, Tonari no Yamamoto-san); 03. The Everything Girl (全方位性彼女, Zenhōisei Kanojo); 04. Wavering Unbalance (ゆらめきアンバランス, Yurameki Anbaransu); 05. Secrets (ナイショノコトバ, Naisho no Kotoba); 06. Surprise Attack Candy! (ふいうちキャンディ!, Fuiuchi Kyandi!); 07. Love You More Than Anybody Else in this World (世界の誰より大好きな, Sekai no dare Yori Daisuki na); 08. Pure-hearted Afro (純情アフロ, Junjō Afuro); Omake. Limited Girl (1) (限定少女, Gentei Shōjo)
2	Colored Communication; Irozuki COMYUNIKESHON (イロヅキコミュニケーション)	May 2, 2008	978-4-08-874515-2
09. Alluring Miss Dolphin (トキメキドルフィン, Tokimeki Dorufin); 10. Reverse Boys (逆走少年, Gyakusō shōnen); 11. Before the Snow Starts Falling (雪が降り出すその前に, Yuki ga Furidasu Sono Mae ni); 12. Want to Say, But Can't Say (言いたくて,言えなくて, Ītakute, Ienakute); 13. Colored Communication (イロヅキコミュニケション, Irozuki Komyunikēshon); 14. Kotatsu, Mandarins, and One More Thing (こたつとみかんともう一つ, Kotatsu to Mikan to mō Hitotsu); 15. Let's Kiss (キスをしようよ, Kisu o Shiyō yo); 16. Confused Diving! (とまどいダイビング!, Tomadoi Daibingu!); 17. The Shape of Love (恋するカタチ, Koi Suru Katachi); Omake. Limited Girl (2) (限定少女, Gentei Shōjo)
3	The Melancholy of the Chocolate Bomber; Chokorēto Bomā no Yūutsu (チョコレート·ボマーの憂鬱)	July 30, 2008	978-4-08-874545-9
18. The Melancholy of the Chocolate Bomber (1/3): Ignite (チョコレート·ボマーの憂鬱1/3<点火-ignite->, Chokorēto Bomā no Yūutsu 1/3 <Tenkaーigniteー>); 19. The Melancholy of the Chocolate Bomber (2/3): Drop (チョコレート·ボマーの憂鬱2/3<投下-drop->, Chokorēto Bomā no Yūutsu 2/3 <Tōkaーdropー>); 20. The Melancholy of the Chocolate Bomber (3/3): Burst (チョコレート·ボマーの憂鬱3/3<炸裂-burst->, Chokorēto Bomā no Yūutsu 3/3 <Sakuretsuーburstー>); 21. Konohana Sakuya (1/3): One Flower Bud (コノハナサクヤ1/3<つぼみひとつ>, Konohana Sakuya 1/3 <Tsubomi Hitotsu>); 22. Konohana Sakuya (2/3): Open Seamed and the Change of Color (コノハナサクヤ2/3<ほころんで, いろづいて>, Konohana Sakuya 2/3 <Hokoronde, irozuite>); 23. Konohana Sakuya (3/3): In Those Memories, Fully Blooming (コノハナサクヤ3/3<その思い出には満開の>, Konohana Sakuya 3/3 <Sono Omoide ni wa mankai no>); 24. Kappa Fight!! (カッパファイト!!, Kappa Faito!!); 25. Sparkling Pool (I) (キラキラ☆プール<前編>, Kira Kira Pōru <Zenpen>); 26. Sparkling Pool (II) (キラキラ☆プール<後編>, Kira Kira Pōru <Kōhen>); Omake. Limited Girl (3) (限定少女, Gentei Shōjo)
4	First Love Limited; Hatsukoi rimiteddo (ハツコイリミテッド)	September 4, 2008	978-4-08-874568-8
27. Boys' Escape part 1: Disappearing Sleepless Dreamers (少年達の逃避行その1: 失踪する寝不足ドリ-マ-, Shōnen-tachi no Esukēpu Sono Ichi: Shissō Suru Nebusoku Dorīmā); 28. Boys' Escape part 2: Pursuing Sleepless Dreamers (少年達の逃避行その2: 追跡する寝不足ドリ-マ-, Shōnen-tachi no Esukēpu Sono Ni: Tsuiseki Suru Nebusoku Dorīmā); 29. Boys' Escape part 3: Complicating Sleepless Dreamers (少年達の逃避行その3: 交錯する寝不足ドリ-マ-, Shōnen-tachi no Esukēpu Sono San: Kōsaku Suru Nebusoku Dorīmā); 30. Boys' Escape part 4: Sprinting Sleepless Dreamers (少年達の逃避行その4: 疾走する寝不足ドリ-マ-, Shōnen-tachi no Esukēpu Sono Yon: Shissō Suru Nebusoku Dorīmā); 31. Rainbow-Colored Drop (虹色ドロップ, Nijiiro Doroppu); 32. First Love Limited (ハツコイリミテッド, Hatsukoi Rimiteddo); Omake. Emergency Omake Manga (緊急おまけマンガ, Kinkyuu Omake manga); Omake. Limited Girl (4) (限定少女, Gentei Shōjo)

=== Drama CD ===
A drama CD adaptation was released by Shueisha on February 16, 2009.

=== Light novel ===
A light novel adaptation written by Sawako Hirabayasi called Winter Photography (ウィンター·フォトグラフィー, Wintā Fotogurafī) (ISBN 978-4-08-703200-0) was published by Shueisha on March 23, 2009.

=== Anime ===
The anime television series adaptation was produced by J.C.Staff, written by Mariko Kunisawa, and directed by Yoshiki Yamakawa, with character designs by Tomoyuki Shitaya. The opening theme is "Future Stream" by sphere, and the ending theme is "Hatsukoi Limited" by marble. The series debuted on April 11, 2009, on in Japan on BS11, and completed on June 27, 2009, with the twelfth episode.

The series was licensed for English release in North America by Sentai Filmworks, releasing it on DVD on July 21, 2012.

==== Episodes ====
No.	Title	Original release date
1	"Beauty A and Monster Z"; Transliteration: "Bishōjo A to yajū Z" (Japanese: 美少女Aと野獣Z)	April 11, 2009
Ayumi Arihara wants a boy to confess to her. She got her wish in an unsettling way: after school, the monstrous Misao Zaitsu gives her a love letter and confesses his feelings to Ayumi. Because she doesn't like him and she is afraid of him she thinks of a way to reject him but is afraid of his answer. The next day in school she is carried by Mamoru, Misao's younger brother, to the infirmary and falls in love with him. After the school she is kidnapped and held hostage by some guys who want to lure Misao out.
2	"Yamamoto-san from Next Door"; Transliteration: "Tonari no Yamamoto-san" (Japanese: となりの山本さん)	April 18, 2009
Suspicious about not being happy that Ayumi gives Mamoru cookies for saving her, his friend Kusuda questions him about being in love. After Mamoru shows him the girl which he likes, who is actually in high school, they both go to Mamoru's home. There the neighbor girl from next door comes through his window. It turns out to be Misaki Yamamoto, the girl he loves. But unfortunately she only sees him as a childhood friend--no, as a younger brother.
3	"Wavering Unbalance"; Transliteration: "Yurameki Anbaransu" (Japanese: ゆらめきアンバランス)	April 25, 2009
A school sports tournament is about to be held. The class are discussing who wants to take part in the several competitions. When Enomoto recommend Dobashi for the girls' 100 meter sprint, Dobashi earns payback by recommending her for the class's cheer duties. When nobody wants to become a male partner for Enomoto, Kusuda volunteers himself to do the job. Unfortunately these two do not get along--Kusuda is a boy whom Enomoto dislikes because of his less good looks, and Enomoto decides to do the sewing of the cheerleader costumes and the lyrics for the cheer song by herself. She works every night on them to a point of exhaustion. Even so, on the day before the tournament, despite she said such mean things to him, Kusuda helps her out, even puts a good word for Kei in front of their homeroom adviser; and Kei somehow sees him as a potential boyfriend candidate. And he seems to like her too because he took a photo of Kei, in the only finished cheerleader outfit, and sleeping, and made it into his cellphone's wallpaper.
4	"The One I Love the Most"; Transliteration: "Sekai no Dare yori Daisuki na" (Japanese: 世界の誰より大好きな)	May 2, 2009
The Bessho family patriarch goes away for a while owing to a job assignment, leaving siblings Yoshihiko and Koyoi alone in the house, much to Koyoi's delight, so as to keep her brother to herself at home. Meanwhile, Yuuji Arihara, upset about a misunderstanding about his sister Ayumi and Misao, forces a lollipop into Misaki Yamamoto's mouth to explain his point to Yoshihiko. Yoshihiko, embarrassed at what his friend had just done, and holding a secret one-sided love for Misaki, apologizes and leads Yuuji away. Upon receiving a call from Misaki, Yoshihiko meets her at a local restaurant. Koyoi, alarmed at the fact that her brother likes someone other than her, trails him in order to "scout the enemy." Misaki reveals her feelings for Yuuji and asks Yoshihiko for help. Being the nice guy that gets looked over, Yoshihiko agrees to help.
5	"Confused Diving"; Transliteration: "Tomadoi Daibingu" (Japanese: とまどいダイビング)	May 9, 2009
Meguru Watase's old senpai Gengurou Takei tries to recruit her, revealed to be a former Olympic swimming candidate, to join the team in the form of a challenge. However, she refuses because she is embarrassed at the fact that she has large breasts because, as Meguru reveals, she doesn't like the attention that her breasts give her. And recruiting her becomes imperative for Takei, especially that the high school swimming club just lost a member and is about to lose club status if they don't find a new member within a week. Meanwhile, Sogabe realizes his love for Nao Chikura.
6	"Before it Snows"; Transliteration: "Yuki ga Furidasu Sono Mae ni" (Japanese: 雪が降り出すその前に)	May 16, 2009
Sogabe and Kusuda decided to have a Christmas party in order to spend Christmas with the ones they love. They all agree to exchange presents. Kei Enomoto decides to buy Kusuda a present for Christmas but runs into him at the store. Embarrassed, they both start acting cold to each other, leading Enomoto to say harsh things to Kusuda, hurting his feelings. Enomoto tries to apologize but never gets an opportune moment to. In an unforeseen chain of events, Chikura catches a cold (and Sogabe deciding to go visit her) and Mamoru (and Ayumi) leaves to help a sick man... leaving an odd couple like Enomoto and Kusuda alone on Christmas.
7	"Let's Kiss"; Transliteration: "Kisu o Shiyō yo" (Japanese: キスをしようよ)	May 23, 2009
Rika Dobashi is cool, tough, and very independent. After leaving Kei Enomoto to walk home with Haruto Terai, a boy with glasses, Enomoto finds out that Dobashi is dating him. Enomoto gives advice to Dobashi, saying that she never lets her guard down which would probably make her boyfriend, Terai, uncomfortable. Terai is starting to feel insecure about his relationship with Dobashi for she is indeed, very independent. Realizing this, Dobashi tries to make it up to him.
8	"The Melancholy of the Chocolate Bomber"; Transliteration: "Chokorēto Bomā no Yūutsu" (Japanese: チョコレート·ボマーの憂鬱)	May 30, 2009
In an attempt to light a blazing fire in Yuuji Arihara's heart, Misaki Yamamoto decides to give him honmei chocolate on Valentine's Day. However, she learns of Mamoru Zaitsu's and Yoshihiko Bessho's feelings for her and begins to get cold feet. Ayumi and Koyoi decide to force "their boys" to give up on Misaki by showing them the moment she presents the chocolate to Yuuji. To our surprise, Kusuda receives chocolate from Kei Enomoto.
9	"In Full Bloom For Those Memories"; Transliteration: "Sono Omoide ni wa Mankai no" (Japanese: その思い出には満開の)	June 6, 2009
This episode focuses mostly on Nao Chikura and her goal of finishing a painting for the graduates, she being inspired by a painting of Yukito Renjou hanging just above the Art Room blackboard. She didn't expect Yukito to appear and come to help her finish the painting. but he left Japan early for his lifetime career of international social work, leaving Nao brokenhearted. Meanwhile, Sogabe, unaware of what's going on, is still finding ways on how to get closer to Nao; as Ayumi and Koyoi were scolded by Kei for what they did during that date between Yuuji and Misaki... and Kei having (unsettling) misgivings about that gift she gave Kusuda.
10	"Kappa Fight!!"; Transliteration: "Kappa Faito!!" (Japanese: カッパファイト!!)	June 13, 2009
Sumire Fudounomiya, the new president of the Theater Club, wants Kusuda in her proposed production to play the role of a kappa. Kei, despite bickering with Kusuda, seems to be annoyed, and is objecting to the idea, especially when Sumire is employing "dirty" tactics to bring Kusuda over. Until Kusuda got angry when an annoyed Kei interrupted a friendly chat between him and Sumire, bringing Kei to the verge of tears. Meanwhile, Nanoka Kyuuma enters high school, and challenged Meguru to a backstroke duel for starters. Q-chan (as Meguru would call, her much to Kyuuma's dislike) defeated Meguru, leaving her uncertain. But Takei managed to bring her back into contention, making that defeat a point for improvement. Back at the junior high, Mamoru, Sogabe, and Kusuda plan to run away from home.
11	"Boys' Escape"; Transliteration: "Shōnen-tachi no Tōhikō" (Japanese: 少年達の逃避行)	June 20, 2009
Mamoru, Sogabe, and Kusuda agreed to run away, and it wasn't long until the others, notably Kei (who apologized profusely to Kusuda), Ayumi, Nao, and Mamoru's brother Misao found out about it and started to worry (Misao and Ayumi went into hysteria over Mamoru at one point, because they thought that note Mamoru left was a suicide note). Meanwhile, the boys seem to encounter difficulties, as the boys have little money combined, and Sogabe only had sweets in his bag; and they were hopelessly lost. When the boys turned off their phones in an effort to conceal their location, Kei, Ayumi, and Nao decided to go look for them, with Koyoi tagging along, getting a clue from a phone call they made to Kusuda's phone (and Rika passing this trip)... until Kei saw from a window on their train the three boys on a road following the train's route, furiously pedaling on their bicycles for dear life as they were chased by a sounder of angrily rampaging wild boar--they were caught in the path of the location's annual Wild Boar Race... Meanwhile, as Yoshihiko and Yuuji are worried about their younger sisters, looks like Misaki is getting the impression that Yuuji isn't interested in her, as she told Yoshihiko. She, however, took it lightly.
12	"First Love Limited"; Transliteration: "Hatsukoi Rimiteddo" (Japanese: 初恋限定)	June 27, 2009
Kei, Ayumi, Koyoi and Nao plan their next move while taking a dip in an onsen, as Yoshihiko, Yuuji and Misao are on their way to see their siblings. Meanwhile, after spending the night huddled in one sleeping bag, and running out of luck, Kusuda, Sogabe, and Mamoru ran to the beach, yelling their feelings for the ones they love... but not knowing that the girls they harbor feelings for have caught up with them--and were just behind them! Sogabe had no trouble expressing what he feels for Nao; Ayumi talked to Mamoru about what she feels; and Kei, who got the biggest shock of all, literally tackled a runaway Kusuda to the sand. Back home, in a separate incident, Rika Dobashi, finding out that the girls found the missing boys, revealed that if Haruto Terai were to do what Kusuda, Mamoru, and Sogabe did, she'd hate it. Days after the beach escapade, Yuuji talked to Misaki; while Ayumi went straight to the Zaitsu household to literally choose between the boy that she loves and the boy that loves her.

== Reception ==
The first volume of First Love Limited reached number 10 on the Tohan list of best-selling manga in the week it was released.

The opening episode was rated 4 out of 5 by Anime News Network's Theron Martin, who described it as "surprisingly funny and even occasionally sweet" despite "a typical set-up and an overused plot device." Carlo Santos rated the episode 2.5 out of 5, saying "this would be a lot more appealing if the plot weren't so cut-and-dried and the characters weren't so transparent." Carl Kimlinger gave it 3 ½, citing the episode's sensitivity to the character's emotions and that the "female cast is downright delectable, the fan-service lovingly animated, and the overall look realistic."
