= Anedoki =

Japanese manga series

- First tankōbon volume cover, featuring Natsuki Hagiwara (top) and Kouta Ochiai (below)

あねどきっ
- Genre: Romantic comedy
- Manga
- Written by: Mizuki Kawashita
- Published by: Shueisha
- Imprint: Jump Comics
- Magazine: Weekly Shōnen Jump
- Original run: July 6, 2009 – January 18, 2010
- Volumes: 3
- icon

Anedoki (あねどきっ; "Older Sister Startle") is a Japanese manga series written and illustrated by Mizuki Kawashita. It was serialized in Shueisha's shōnen manga magazine Weekly Shōnen Jump from July 2009 to January 2010, with its chapters collected in three tankōbon volumes.

== Plot ==
The series follows Kouta Ochiai, a 13-year-old boy who encounters a 17-year-old mysterious girl named Natsuki Hagiwara on his way home from school. She asks him if he is willing to share his ice cream and calls him a pervert after noticing and wondering what Kouta was thinking when she was eating. Shocked about the accusation, he runs away, dropping his student handbook by accident. Arriving at home, he finds out that his father was transferred because of his work, leaving him alone. Natsuki meets Kouta again to give back his handbook, and learns about his situation. Natsuki then decides to repay the favor for the ice cream by taking care of Kouta while his father is gone.

== Characters ==
Kouta Ochiai (落合 洸太, Ochiai Kōta)
A 13-year-old first-year middle school student. He gets mad as soon as people call him a kid due to his short height. He thinks that he is more mature than his new housemate Natsuki, but is easily embarrassed when she is around him. At first, he admires Kanade Sakurai, a classmate and an idol in his class, but through living together, he gradually becomes attracted to Natsuki.
Natsuki Hagiwara (萩原 なつき, Hagiwara Natsuki)
A 17-year-old mysterious and carefree high school student who gets involved in Kouta's life after she volunteers herself to be his housemate. She seems to be more childish than Kouta, but sometimes acts like a real adult. Her motives for taking care of Kouta are unknown except that she has to return the favor for an ice cream he shared with her. Although she can be immature, she usually finds a way to help Kouta with his problems. The reason why she ran away from home is because her older sister, Haruki, was about to force her into a political marriage.
Kanade Sakurai (桜井 奏, Sakurai Kanade)
Kouta's classmate. She was the focus of attention at her school until Natsuki arrives. At first, she sees Kouta as just another dull classmate, but she is attracted to his bravery in standing up to a group delinquents to save her, and eventually develops a romantic interest in him. She seems to have an inferiority complex towards Natsuki.
Chiaki Hagiwara (萩原 ちあき, Hagiwara Chiaki)
Natsuki's younger sister who moves into Kouta's house to try to protect Natsuki from Kouta's assumed perverted actions. She is extremely bad at doing household chores, and she cannot cook at all, but is very smart and is down to earth, unlike Natsuki. Chiaki has started to like Kouta, but covers it up by stating that everything he does is perverted (from washing her sister's clothes to eating pudding).

== Publication ==
Written and illustrated by Mizuki Kawashita, Anedoki was serialized in Shueisha's shōnen manga magazine Weekly Shōnen Jump from July 6, 2009, to January 18, 2010. Shueisha collected its chapters in three tankōbon volumes published from December 4, 2009, to April 2, 2010.

=== Volumes ===
No.	Title	Release date	ISBN
1	The Mysterious Girls Invasion; Nazo no Onee-san Shūrai!! (謎のお姉さん 襲来!!)	December 4, 2009	978-4-08-874782-8
2	I Won't Sleep Tonight; Nemure Nai Tōnaito (眠れないトゥナイト)	February 4, 2010	978-4-08-870002-1
3	Sukinanda (好きなんだ)	April 2, 2010	978-4-08-870028-1

== Reception ==
Volume 1 reached number 14 on the Oricon weekly rankings, selling 54,618 copies in its first week. Volume 2 reached number 11, selling 56,282 copies. Volume 3 reached number 17.
