= Strawberry 100% =

Japanese manga series by Mizuki Kawashita

- First tankōbon volume cover, featuring Aya Tojo (left), Junpei Manaka (center), and Tsukasa Nishino (right)

いちご100% (Ichigo 100%)
- Genre: Harem; Romantic comedy
- Manga
- Written by: Mizuki Kawashita
- Published by: Shueisha
- English publisher: NA: Viz Media
- Imprint: Jump Comics
- Magazine: Weekly Shōnen Jump
- Original run: February 19, 2002 – August 1, 2005
- Volumes: 19
- Video game

Strawberry 100% Strawberry Diary
- Developer: Alpha Unit
- Publisher: Tomy
- Platform: PlayStation 2
- Released: February 10, 2005
- Original video animation

Ichigo 100%: Love Begins!?
- Directed by: Noriyasu Yamauchi
- Produced by: Masao Maruyama; Tetsuo Daitoku
- Written by: Jukki Hanada
- Studio: Madhouse
- Released: September 2004
- Anime television series
- Directed by: Osamu Sekita
- Produced by: Naoki Watanabe; Yuji Suzuki
- Written by: Tatsuhiko Urahata
- Music by: Takayuki Negishi
- Studio: Madhouse (Note: Animation production assistance (アニメーション制作協力) for all episodes provided by Studio Matrix and DR Tokyo.)
- Original network: TV Asahi
- Original run: April 5, 2005 – June 21, 2005
- Episodes: 12
- Original video animation
- Directed by: Tomoki Kobayashi
- Produced by: Naoki Watanabe; Tetsuo Daitoku
- Written by: Tsutomu Mizushima
- Music by: Hikaru Nanase
- Studio: Madhouse; Nomad (#1–3); DR TOKYO (#1–3); Office Take Off (#3)
- Released: June 20, 2005 – October 31, 2005
- Runtime: 30 minutes each
- Episodes: 4
- Manga

Ichigo 100% East Side Story
- Written by: Mizuki Kawashita
- Published by: Shueisha
- Magazine: Jump Giga
- Original run: April 28, 2017 – July 28, 2017
- icon

Strawberry 100% (Japanese: いちご100%, Hepburn: Ichigo Hyaku Pāsento) is a Japanese manga series written and illustrated by Mizuki Kawashita. It was serialized in Shueisha's Weekly Shōnen Jump from February 2002 to August 2005, with its chapters collected in 19 tankōbon volumes. The series was licensed in North America by Viz Media, which released fourteen volumes between July 2007 and October 2010.

It was adapted into an anime television series and original video animations (OVAs) by Madhouse and Nomad (OVA only). The anime series was broadcast on TV Asahi from April to July 2005. A manga sequel, subtitled East Side Story, ran in Jump Giga from April to June 2017.

== Story ==
The story follows Junpei Manaka, a student and aspiring filmmaker, throughout his school years and his relationships with several girls. During middle school, he encounters a mysterious girl on the school rooftop but only recalls her strawberry-patterned underwear before she disappears. He discovers a notebook left behind, which belongs to Aya Toujou, a plain-looking but talented writer. The two bond over their shared passion for storytelling and filmmaking. Believing Tsukasa Nishino, the most popular girl in school, might be the rooftop girl, Junpei impulsively asks her out while exercising on a chin-up bar. Though he later realizes she is not the mystery girl, they continue dating. After enrolling at Izumizaka High School, Junpei learns that Aya has declined admission to the prestigious Oumi Academy to attend the same school as him—and that she was the girl from the rooftop.

At Izumizaka, Junpei befriends Satsuki Kitaoji, a spirited girl who develops romantic feelings for him. Attempting to join the defunct film club, he revives it with Aya, Satsuki, and other classmates as members. Meanwhile, his childhood friend Yui Minamito moves into his family's home but attends Oumi Academy. The film club produces annual movies for the school festival, each written by Aya and directed by Junpei. Satsuki stars in the first film, Tsukasa in the second, and Aya in the third.

Throughout high school, Junpei navigates romantic and sexual tension with the four girls. Though dating Tsukasa, he harbors unresolved feelings for Aya, leading to indecision. Frustrated by his hesitation, Tsukasa breaks up with him. Junpei and Aya grow closer, but when he learns Tsukasa still has feelings for him, he wavers again. Their third year brings further complications as they face future career paths: Tsukasa plans to study pastry-making in Paris, while Aya initially intends to attend the same university as Junpei, despite criticism for prioritizing him over better academic opportunities. She later reconsiders, disappointing Junpei.

The situation escalates when Junpei mistakes Aya's brother for a new boyfriend, realizing too late that she has always loved him. After Tsukasa confesses her lingering feelings, Junpei briefly reconnects with her but ultimately ends their relationship, acknowledging his own immaturity and need for personal growth. Following graduation, the friends pursue separate paths.

Four years later, they reunite at a restaurant owned by Satsuki. Aya has become an acclaimed novelist, winning the Naoki Prize, while Junpei has matured as a filmmaker and secured a position at a film studio. He hopes to adapt Aya's work without resentment. The story concludes with Junpei reuniting with Tsukasa, who has returned from Paris, and the two resume their relationship.

=== East Side Story ===
The story introduces Nakama, an aspiring writer working at a bookstore, who has a fateful encounter with Aya. While reaching for a book, she falls onto him, inadvertently revealing her strawberry-patterned underwear. Though mutually attracted, neither openly admits their feelings. The situation grows complicated when Satsuki informs Nakama that Aya's interest in him may stem from her lingering affection for Junpei. Later, Nakama and Aya meet to watch a film and talk. When her heel breaks, he carries her to assist her, but her draft papers scatter in the wind. Nakama retrieves most of them, while Aya departs as he continues searching for the remaining pages.

During their next meeting, Nakama returns the recovered drafts, confessing he has read them. He declares his love for Aya despite knowing she remains fixated on Junpei, emphasizing that he wishes to be valued for himself rather than as a substitute for Junpei. Aya considers abandoning writing due to unresolved feelings, but Nakama encourages her to persevere, vowing to dedicate himself to his own writing as well. The story concludes with both characters continuing to pursue their craft.

== Characters ==
Junpei Manaka (真中 淳平, Manaka Junpei)
Voiced by: Kenichi Suzumura
A teenage school student. Junpei is constantly getting strung up in numerous embarrassing but endearing romantic situations throughout middle and then high school. Although his thoughts on girls can get quite self-involved and one-sided on occasion, his gentleness and kindness is what attracts them to him. His indecisiveness about the girls he loves—Aya, Satsuki, and Tsukasa—and inability to decipher their feelings is the focal point of the story. His dream is to direct films. While not academically gifted, he has a talent with cinematography that gradually develops as the story progresses. Junpei also grows more responsible in relationships. He has been seeing other girls while Tsukasa was still his girlfriend, and later while Aya is about to give up better universities. By the end of the series Junpei remains with Tsukasa rather than Aya. He is more considerate about Aya after hearing himself hugging Aya unconsciously. After graduation, with the risk of Tsukasa finding someone else in Paris, Junpei worked hard alone in Japan until they reunite. These experiences help make him a more determined and confident person.
Aya Tojo (東城 綾, Tōjō Aya)
Voiced by: Mamiko Noto
A shy, affectionate teenage student. Aya is the mystery girl with the ichigo pantsu (strawberry panties—underwear with strawberry patterns) that Junpei seeks at the beginning of the series. Aya starts as a nerdy top student who wears large glasses and unattractive hairstyle. She is secretly writing a fantasy novel on her math notebook but lacks the confidence to show it. Junpei discovers the novel and encourages her to become a writer by sharing his dream of becoming a filmmaker, which he is also afraid to tell anyone. Aya falls in love with Junpei, and wonders about the ending of her novel—whether the hero will choose the beautiful princess or the ordinary girl who shares his dream—which coincides with their love triangle. She starts wearing contact lenses and lets her hair down, surprising the boys with her beauty. Aya attends Izumizaka High with Junpei and writes scripts for his three films. She expresses her affection for him gently. Although Junpei is attracted to Aya, he seldom senses the depth of her feelings. According to the afterwords, the author thinks that, among the main characters, Aya shows the most growth.
Tsukasa Nishino (西野つかさ, Nishino Tsukasa)
Voiced by: Megumi Toyoguchi
The most popular student in Junpei's middle school. She becomes Junpei's girlfriend early on in the manga, only to break up with him soon after entering high school. Supportive, understanding, and optimistic, she does her best to encourage Junpei in everything he does, yet is also straightforward and flirtatious enough to let him know exactly what she wants. Of the four lead female characters, Tsukasa's personality changes the most: flighty and somewhat hot-tempered during her middle school days, she develops a far more mature attitude soon after entering Oumi Academy. Tsukasa has a passion for cooking and baking, and works part-time at a French pastry shop. Her dream to study pastry-making further in France after graduation from high school forces her and Junpei to break up again several months after getting back together, but the two reunite once more upon her return to Japan.
Satsuki Kitaoji (北大路 さつき, Kitaōji Satsuki)
Voiced by: Sanae Kobayashi
A student of Izumizaka High. Satsuki is very popular among the boys in the school, mainly with the sports clubs and teams. Of all the girls after Junpei, Satsuki is the most confident in her love—having been the first to confess to him—and is constantly seen in his company. Unlike the others, Satsuki is very aggressive, often physical, with her feelings. She is confident about her attractive figure, particularly her large bust size, and constantly tries to push herself onto Junpei. Despite her total devotion toward him, Satsuki's feelings are rarely returned.
Yui Minamito (南戸 唯, Minamito Yui)
Voiced by: Nana Mizuki
Once a neighbor and childhood friend of Junpei before moving away, Yui acts more like a sister than a friend, despite being only a year younger. She is not at all shy around Junpei. To her embarrassment, Yui strips naked in her sleep; occasionally she will wake up midway through and redress herself (and is thankful that she tends to stay in bed and rarely sleepwalks). Though considered one of the four main heroines in the series, Yui is never considered a love interest, nor does she ever show Junpei any affection outside of their sibling-type relationship. She does act at times like an overprotective big sister (especially when Satsuki gets unusually clingy), because Junpei was something of a crybaby in their childhood days.

== Media ==
=== Manga ===
Written and illustrated by Mizuki Kawashita, Strawberry 100% was serialized in Shueisha's shōnen manga magazine Weekly Shōnen Jump from February 19, 2002, (Note: It debuted in the magazine's 12th issue of 2002 (cover date March 4), released on February 19 of the same year.) to August 1, 2005. The 167 chapters were then compiled into nineteen tankōbon volumes by Shueisha, released from August 2, 2002, to December 2, 2005.

Strawberry 100% was later licensed for English language release by Viz Media. The first volume was released on July 3, 2007. The 14th volume was the latest, and was released on October 5, 2010. Viz Media also partnered with fellow publishing house Tokyopop for release in Germany under the name 100% Strawberry.

A sequel, subtitled East Side Story, was serialized in Shueisha's Jump Giga from April 28 to July 28, 2017. The story focuses on Aya Tojo as a popular light novelist and university student who attracts the affections of a high school boy named Namaka, who physically resembles Junpei Manaka.

=== Anime ===
Strawberry 100% was adapted into a 12 episode anime television series by Madhouse, written by Tatsuhiko Urahata, and directed by Osamu Sekita. It aired on TV Asahi. Each episode consisted of two short stories. The last pair of stories were not broadcast in the original run; later, this episode has become known as episode 10.5. The opening theme is "Shine of Voice" by Dream and the ending theme is "Ike Ike" by HINOI TEAM.

=== Original video animations ===
The original video animations (OVAs) of Strawberry 100% were all released at different times compared to the TV series. The first OVA was released in October 2004 before the TV series aired (and was made solely by Madhouse).

The opening theme of all five Strawberry 100% OVAs is "Kimiiro 100%" (君色100%), sung by the voice actresses of the four lead characters, Mamiko Noto, Megumi Toyoguchi, Nana Mizuki, and Sanae Kobayashi. The ending theme is different in each episode.

- "Peppermint" (ペパーミント, Pepāminto) by Miyuki Hashimoto (2004 OVA)
- "Jink White" (ジンク・ホワイト, Jinku Howaito) by Mamiko Noto (2005 OVA 1)
- "Daigyakuten Kiss" (大逆転Kiss) by Megumi Toyoguchi (2005 OVA 2)
- "Kokoro Capsule" (ココロカプセル, Kokoro Kapuseru) by Nana Mizuki (2005 OVA 3)
- "Platonic Scandal" (プラトニック・スキャンダル, Puratonikku Sukyandaru) by Sanae Kobayashi (2005 OVA 4)

=== Video game ===
A PlayStation 2 video game was later released, titled Strawberry 100%: Strawberry Diary (いちご100%ストロベリーダイアリー, Ichigo 100%: Sutoroberi Daiari). The game was developed by Alpha Unit and published by Tomy, and released on February 10, 2005, in Japan. The game was re-released under the Tomy Best Collection on March 30, 2006.

== Reception ==
Initially critics expressed concern that Strawberry 100% would be a traditional harem comedy. Carlo Santos of Anime News Network (ANN) complained that Volume 1 quickly descended into "typical boy's romance fodder." Response to the characters was more enthusiastic. Robert Harris of Mania.com praised Volume 1 for developing "several effective, organic characters and relationships, along with a believable story and setting". Praise for the characters continued with the release of subsequent volumes, and worries that Strawberry 100% would be a traditional harem comedy abated. In his review of Volume 6, A.E. Sparrow of IGN Comics remarked "Strawberry 100% is a harem manga of the highest caliber, and it has all the trappings of a good harem manga: Plenty of fan service, excellent artwork, and in those rarest of cases, a compelling storyline." Comic Book Bin's Leroy Douresseaux, discussing Volume 8, enjoyed the excellent characters, and commented: "Strawberry 100% is a high school comedy/drama for everyone who loves the drama of high school love."

Most critics have praised the artwork. Harris noted: "The visual style remains firmly rooted in reality." While crediting Strawberry 100% with "some of the finest artwork available", Sparrow warned that Strawberry 100% has a great deal of fan service, "which will either repulse people or draw them in, depending on their predilection toward that kind of thing".
