= Mizuki Kawashita =

Japanese manga artist

Mizuki Kawashita 河下 水希
- Born: August 30, 1971 (age 55) Shizuoka Prefecture, Japan
- Area: Manga artist
- Pseudonym: Mikan Momokuri (桃栗 みかん)
- Notable works: Strawberry 100%, First Love Limited

Mizuki Kawashita (河下 水希, Kawashita Mizuki; born August 30, 1971) is a Japanese manga artist, best known for her romantic comedy Strawberry 100% which was published by Shueisha in Weekly Shōnen Jump from 2002 to 2005, and would later receive a television anime and OVA adaptation. During the early part of her career, she wrote and illustrated under the pen name Mikan Momokuri (桃栗 みかん, Momokuri Mikan). Her first public work was a dōjinshi called Innocent in 1993. Another series, First Love Limited, was adapted into a 12-episode anime television series and aired in 2009. Other works include Lilim Kiss, Akane-chan overdrive and Anedoki.

== Works ==
List of manga works
Title	Year	Notes	Refs
Sora no Seibun (空の成分, Empty Component); As Mikan Momokuri	1997	Published by You Comics, Margaret 1 volume	
Akane-chan Over Drive (あかねちゃん OVER DRIVE); As Mikan Momokuri	1999	Serialized in Bouquet Published by Margaret comics, 2 volumes	
Kaede Typhoon (かえで台風); As Mikan Momokuri	1999		
Ririmu Kissu (りりむキッス, Lilim Kiss)	2000	Serilalized in Weekly Shōnen Jump; Published by Shueisha in 2 volumes	
Strawberry 100%	2002–05	Serilalized in Weekly Shōnen Jump; Published by Shueisha in 19 volumes	
First Love Limited	2007–08	Serialized in Weekly Shōnen Jump; Published by Shueisha in 4 volumes	
Anedoki	2009–10	Serialized in Weekly Shōnen Jump; Published by Shueisha in 3 volumes	
Boku no Idol (ボクのアイドル, My Idol)	2010	one-shot	
G-Maru Edition (((G)えでぃしょん), (G) Edition)	2010	Serialized in Jump Comics and Jump Comics SQ; Published in 2 volumes	
Te to Kuchi (てとくち)	2013	Serialized in Weekly Shōnen Jump; Published by Shueisha in 5 volumes	
Gunjō ni Siren (Ultramarine Siren); As Mikan Momokuri	2015–2020	Serialized in Shueisha's You magazine and Shōnen Jump+ online platform. Collected in 12 volumes.	
High School Boys (高校男子BOYS); As Mikan Momokuri		Published by You Comics DX, Margaret 1 volume	
Maple Typhoon (かえで台風); As Mikan Momokuri		Published by Margaret Comics, 1 volume	
Part Threes (Part Threes)	December 11, 2020	Serialized in Weekly Shounen Jump, originally written by Nisio Isin, one-shot manga.	
