= List of series run in Ultra Jump =

Promotional visual for the 30th anniversary of Ultra Jump

Ultra Jump, a monthly seinen manga magazine published by Shueisha, has featured numerous series since its launch in 1995. The list, organized by decade and year of when the series started, will list each series run in the manga magazine, the author of the series and, in case the series has ended, when it has ended.

== 1990s ==
=== 1995–1999 ===
Title	Illustrator/Author	First issue	Final issue
Ashen Victor (灰者)	Yukito Kishiro	September 1995	July 1996
Tattoon Master (タトゥーン☆マスター)	Akihisa Yanari	1996	1997
Steam Detectives (快傑蒸気探偵団)	Kia Asamiya	1996	1998
Outlaw Star (アウトロースター)	Takehiko Itō	1996	1999
Fortune (フォーチュン)	Nao Kurebayashi	1997	1998
Bōken Dokino Watashi-tachi Densetsu (冒険どきの私達伝説)	Q-Taro Hanamizawa	1997	1998
Sanjūshi Jiken Chō (三銃士事件帖)	Kaishaku	1997	January 2000
Martian Deka (火星人刑事)	Kōichirō Yasunaga	1997	September 2002
Agharta (アガルタ)	Takaharu Matsumoto	August 1997	2009
Migawari Accidents (みがわりアクシデンツ)	Hiroshi Aro	1998	1998
Silent Genesis (寡黙の刻)	Hiromichi Yoshino	1998	1999
Aqua Knight (水中騎士)	Yukito Kishiro	1998	September 2000
The KNDI Files: A Case Chronicle of a Young Private Detectivess (少女探偵 金田はじめの事件簿)	Yoshitoh Asari	1998	February 2000
Angel Note (エンジェルノート)	Motō Koyama	1998	January 2001
Heart Sugar Town	Kohime Ohse	1998	January 2001
Sadamitsu the Destroyer (破壊魔定光)	Masahiko Nakahira	#28, 1998	November 2005
Tenjho Tenge (天上天下)	Oh! Great	November 1998	September 2010
I t (イット)	Toshiki Yui	1999	1999
Riot	Satoshi Shiki	1999	1999
The Monkey King (西遊奇伝 大猿王)	Katsuya Terada	1999	September 2000
Kagome Kagome (かごめかごめ)	Toshiki Yui	June 1999	July 2001
Jomoguida the Ult.Sister (最終シスター四方木田)	Hime Ira	1999	December 2002
Agito Immortal (不死者あぎと)	Yuri Narushima	November 1999	February 2004

== 2000s ==
=== 2000–2004 ===
Title	Illustrator/Author	First issue	Final issue
Read or Die	Shutaro Yamada, Hideyuki Kurata (writer)	January 2000	June 2002
Takeru Hime (タケルヒメ)	Fujihiko Hosono	February 2000	August 2000
Arahabaki (アラハバキ)	Rikudō Kōshi	March 2000	September 2001
BWH	Q-Taro Hanamizawa	March 2000	August 2002
The Story of Fukujin's Mysterious Town (福神町綺譚)	Kamui Fujiwara	April 2000	October 2000
T T	aloha	April 2000	July 2000
Omokage Maru (面影丸)	Yū Itō	May 2000	December 2000
Happy World! (ハッピーワールド!)	Kenjirō Takeshita	June 2000	July 2006
Samurai Gun Gekkō (サムライガン月光)	Kazuhiro Kumagai	October 2000	December 2003
Neko Nekotai ga Iku!! (ねこねこ隊が行く!!)	Mitsue Aoki	October 2000	May 2004
Propeller Heaven (プロペラ天国)	Hitoshi Tomizawa	November 2000	September 2001
Gunnm: Last Order (銃夢 Last Order)	Yukito Kishiro	December 2000	July 2010
Bastard!! Heavy Metal, Dark Fantasy (BASTARD!! -暗黒の破壊神-)	Kazushi Hagiwara	January 2001 (Note: Transferred from Weekly Shōnen Jump)	Indefinite hiatus
Puppet Show -Kuǐlěi Xì- (傀儡戲-カーレイヒ-)	Akira Takahashi	February 2001	September 2003
Luca, the Summer I Shared with You (琉伽といた夏)	Masaya Hokazono	April 2001	October 2003
Magical Meow Meow Taruto (魔法少女猫たると)	Kaishaku	May 2001	June 2003
Petit Monster (ぷちモン)	Aoi Nanase	September 2001	February 2010
God of the Sands, People of the Sky (砂の神 空の人)	Toshiki Yui	November 2001	May 2002
Strega! (ストレガ!)	Kōichirō Yonemura	November 2001	November 2003
Heaven's Prison (天獄 -HEAVEN'S PRISON-)	Hiroyuki Utatane	August 2002	May 2015
My Two Wings (ボクのふたつの翼)	Toshiki Yui	August 2002	October 2005
Hells Angels	Sin-Ichi Hiromoto, SUMMER (supervisor)	September 2002	May 2004
The Tale of Genji (源氏物語)	Tatsuya Egawa, Murasaki Shikibu (writer)	October 2002	February 2005
Read or Dream	Ran Ayanaga, Hideyuki Kurata (writer)	November 2002	June 2005
B. Reaction! (B.リアクション!)	Hirohisa Tsuruta	February 2003	November 2004
Needless	Kami Imai	November 2003	2013
Cloth Road (クロスロオド)	Okama, Hideyuki Kurata (writer)	December 2003	2011
Blue Sanctus (蒼のサンクトゥス)	Hajime Yamamura	January 2004	February 2007
Between You And Me (僕と君の間に)	Nakaba Suzuki	March 2004	March 2006
Imperial Guards (皇国の守護者)	Yū Itō, Daisuke Satō (writer)	July 2004	October 2007
Go Go★Heaven (GO GO★HEAVEN)	Sin-Ichi Hiromoto	August 2004	May 2005

=== 2005–2009 ===
Title	Illustrator/Author	First issue	Final issue
Steel Ball Run (スティール・ボール・ラン) (JoJo's Bizarre Adventure Part 7)	Hirohiko Araki	April 2005	May 2011
Abara	Tsutomu Nihei	June 2005	April 2006
Dogs: Bullets & Carnage	Shirow Miwa	July 2005	Indefinite hiatus
Ninku: Second Stage – Stories of Etonins (忍空 -SECOND STAGE 干支忍編-)	Kōji Kiriyama	October 2005	September 2011
Wild ☆ Pitch (わいるど☆ぴっち)	Mario Kaneda	November 2005	September 2007
Grandeek ReeL	Kohime Ohse	December 2005	Indefinite hiatus
Biomega (バイオメガ)	Tsutomu Nihei	May 2006	February 2009
Roman (ロマン)	Yukimaru Katsura, Sound Horizon (writer)	May 2007	November 2008
Peace Maker	Ryōji Minagawa	July 2007	June 2016
Mebius Gear (メビウスギア)	Shinshi Rikudō, Toshiki Inōe (writer)	December 2007	November 2009
Shumerian (シュメール星人)	Yū Tsunamino	January 2008	June 2010
Hayate × Blade (はやて×ブレード)	Shizuru Hayashiya	September 2008	July 2013
Akikan! (アキカン)	Momotaro Miyano	November 2008	June 2009
Anima Chal Lives (アニマ・カル・リブス)	Park Sung-woo	December 2008	February 2012
Hatsukoi Magical Blitz (初恋マジカルブリッツ)	Naoto Tenhiro, Shōta Asuka (writer)	February 2009	April 2012
Gingitsune (ぎんぎつね)	Sayori Ochiai	June 2009	October 2022
No One Knows ~Confucius Didn't Say~ (誰も知らない 〜子不語〜)	Xia Da	March 2009	August 2010

== 2010s ==
=== 2010–2014 ===
Title	Illustrator/Author	First issue	Final issue
Dorikei (°Cりけい。)	Wadapen, Juntarō Aoki (writer)	June 2010	May 2014
Jumbor (ユンボル -JUMBOR-)	Hiroyuki Takei, Hiromasa Mikami (writer)	August 2010	Indefinite hiatus
Moon Edge	Masayuki Takano	November 2010	2012
Hieda's Students (2) Evil Sea Fish (稗田の生徒たち（2） 悪魚の海)	Daijirō Morohoshi	December 2010	March 2011
Kaizyu no Tail (怪獣のテイル)	F4U	January 2011	2012
Tsuki Robo (つきロボ)	Masahiko Nakahira	January 2011	2013
Ad Astra: Scipio and Hannibal (アド・アストラ -スキピオとハンニバル-トラ)	Mihachi Kagano	April 2011	February 2018
JoJolion (ジョジョリオン) (JoJo's Bizarre Adventure Part 8)	Hirohiko Araki	June 2011	September 2021
Papa no Iukoto o Kikinasai: Takanashi no Hidamari (パパのいうことを聞きなさい! 〜小鳥遊の陽だまり〜)	Izumi Kirihara, F4U, Ryu Shinonome, Wadapen, Keiji Watarai	September 2011	February 2012
Chōkakō (長歌行)	Xia Da	January 2012	April 2016
Tail Star (テイルスター)	Okama	February 2012	2014
Steins;Gate Aishin Meizu no Babel (STEINS;GATE 哀心迷図のバベル)	Shinichiro Nariie	June 2012	February 2014
Biorg Trinity (バイオーグ・トリニティ)	Otaro Maijo, Oh! Great	December 2012	January 2018
Kuroda-san to Katagiri-san (黒田さんと片桐さん)	Nini	June 2013	December 2015
Minikui Kaeru no Ko (みにくいカエルの娘)	Takahito Kobayashi	July 2013	January 2015
Hayate × Blade 2 (はやて×ブレード2)	Shizuru Hayashiya	September 2013	December 2017
Koi wa Hikari (恋は光)	Aki★Eda	October 2013	October 2017
Steins;Gate Mugen Enten no Arc Light (STEINS;GATE 無限遠点のアークライト)	5pb., Nitroplus, Yoichiro Nariie	April 2014	October 2014
Q	Tatsuya Shihira	May 2014	December 2015
Momoiro Armet (ももいろアーメット)	Terio Teri	June 2014	June 2015
Dasei 67 Percent (惰性67パーセント)	Shimimaru	August 2014	July 2022
Pro-wres Concerto (プロレス協奏曲)	Nicolas de Crécy, Masato Hara	July 2014	December 2014
Monster's Kindergarten -Kaijin Yōchien- (monster's kindergarten -怪人ようちえん-)	Tetsuyarō Shinkaida	August 2014	February 2019
Selector Infected WIXOSS -Peeping Analyze- (セレクター・インフェクテッド・ウィクロス -ピーピング・アナライズ-)	LRIG, Mari Okada, Manatsu Suzuki	August 2014	May 2015
No Guns Life (ノー・ガンズ・ライフ)	Tasuku Karasuma	September 2014	September 2021
Onikujo Kajuen (オニクジョ果樹園)	Yoichi Abe	September 2014	December 2014
Terra Formars Gaiden Rain Hard (テラフォーマーズ外伝 RAIN HARD)	Yū Sasuga, Kenichi Watanabe, Satoshi Kimura	October 2014	January 2015

=== 2015–2019 ===
Title	Illustrator/Author	First issue	Final issue
Eiyū Kyōshitsu: Honoo no Empress (英雄教室─炎の女帝─)	Shin Araki, Takashi Minakuchi	February 2015	August 2015
Ariadne no Kanmuri (アリアドネの冠)	Mari Shimazaki	March 2015	October 2017
Levius/est	Haruhisa Nakata	April 2015	June 2021
La Vie en Doll	Junya Inoue	June 2015 (Note: Transferred from Jump X)	September 2016
Selector Infected WIXOSS: Mayu no Oheya (selector infected WIXOSS〜まゆのおへや〜)	LRIG, Nini	July 2015	September 2016
Little Witch Academia (リトルウィッチアカデミア)	Trigger, Terio Teri	August 2015	November 2015
Lady & Oldman (レディ&オールドマン)	Natsume Ono	October 2015	August 2019
Rapaz Theme Park (ラパス・テーマパーク)	Shinichirō Nariie	November 2015	April 2018
RWBY	Monty Oum, Rooster Teeth Productions, Shirow Miwa	November 2015	February 2017
Connect (コネクト)	Manatsu Suzuki	December 2015	October 2018
Moira	Sound Horizon, Yukimaru Katsura	January 2016	Indefinite hiatus
Malevolent Spirits: Mononogatari (もののがたり)	Onigunsō	January 2016	July 2023
Rozen Maiden 0 (ローゼンメイデン0 -ゼロ-)	Peach-Pit	February 2016	February 2019
Maōsama Chotto Sore Totte!! (魔王様ちょっとそれとって!!)	Tomoya Haruno	March 2016	October 2018
Space Patrol Luluco (宇宙パトロールルル子)	Trigger, Hiroyuki Imaishi, Nanboku	April 2016	June 2016
Lostorage incited WIXOSS (Lostorage incited WIXOSS〜必殺♡オーネスト〜)	LRIG, Nini	October 2016	December 2016
Border World: Hekiraku no TAO (ボーダーワールド -碧落のTAO-)	Satoshi Kimura	December 2016	March 2018
Melancholia (メランコリア)	Sayman Dowman	January 2017	March 2019
Ii Yu da ne! (いいゆだね!)	Osamu Akimoto	March 2017	June 2019
Tales of the Kingdom (王国物語, Ōkoku Monogatari)	Asumiko Nakamura	May 2017	November 2025
Usagi-moku Shachiku-ka (ウサギ目社畜科)	Kamiya Fujisawa	July 2017	December 2020
Assassins Pride (アサシンズプライド)	Kei Amagi, Yoshie Katō	November 2017	September 2022
World's End Harem: Fantasia (終末のハーレム ファンタジア)	LINK, SAVAN	May 2018	March 2022
Ōkami Rise (オオカミライズ)	Yu Itō	September 2018	September 2021
Tsukiiro no Invader (月色のインベーダー)	Akira Yamano	December 2018	February 2020
Kemurikusa Wakaba Memo (ケムリクサ わかばメモ)	Akira Yamano	February 2019	April 2019
Katabami to Ōgon (片喰と黄金)	Eiichi Kitano	March 2019	October 2021
Lonely Castle in the Mirror (かがみの孤城)	Mizuki Tsujimura, Tomo Taketomi	July 2019	March 2022
Hello World	Manatsu Suzuki, Yoshihiro Sono	August 2019	April 2020
Tadano Kōgyō Kōkō no Nichijō (只野工業高校の日常)	Chisato Oga	August 2019	Present
Bokura wa Mahō Shōnen (ボクらは魔法少年)	Teppei Fukushima	September 2019	August 2021
Black Night Parade (ブラックナイトパレード)	Hikaru Nakamura	October 2019 (Note: Transferred from Weekly Young Jump)	November 2026
Wicked Trapper: Hunter of Heroes (禍つ罠師の勇者狩り)	Wadapen	December 2019	October 2022

== 2020s ==
=== 2020–present ===
Title	Illustrator/Author	First issue	Final issue
Ex-Arm Another Code (EX-ARM Another Code エクスアーム アナザーコード)	Atarō Kumo, Shinya Komi	March 2020	January 2021
Ginga Eiyū Densetsu (銀河英雄伝説)	Ryu Fujisaki	March 2020	March 2026
World's End Harem: Fantasia Academy (終末のハーレム ファンタジア学園)	LINK, Okada Andō	June 2020	March 2022
Denpa teki na Kanojo (電波的な彼女)	Daisuke Furuya, Hiroshi Hiraoka	August 2020	February 2021
Valhalla Ochinchin-kan (ヴァルハラ・オティンティン館)	Gurashi, Yuni	October 2020	Present
Alice-san Chi no Iroribata (アリスさんちの囲炉裏端)	Bunta Kinami	November 2020	April 2023
Recommendations from Iwamoto-senpai (岩元先輩ノ推薦)	Hiroshi Shiibashi	March 2021	Present
Zombie Land Saga: The First Zombie (ゾンビランドサガ外伝 ザ・ファースト・ゾンビィ)	Kasumi Fukagawa	June 2021	December 2022
Flower and Asura (花は咲く、修羅の如く)	Ayano Takeda, Musshu	July 2021	September 2026
Nukitashi (ぬきたし)	Qruppo, Mameojitan	December 2021	March 2024
JoJo's Bizarre Adventure: Shining Diamond's Demonic Heartbreak (ジョジョの奇妙な冒険 クレイジー・Dダイヤモンドの悪霊的失恋)	Kouhei Kadono, Tasuku Karasuma	January 2022	June 2023
It's All Your Fault (全部君のせいだ)	Merryhachi	July 2022	March 2025
holoX MEETing! (ホロックスみーてぃんぐ! ～holoX MEETing!～)	Anmitsu Okada	December 2022	September 2023
The JoJoLands (ザ・ジョジョランズ) (JoJo's Bizarre Adventure Part 9)	Hirohiko Araki	March 2023	Present
Mii-chan Wants to Be Kept (みーちゃんは飼われたい)	Waka Takase	April 2023	June 2025
Nura: Rise of the Yokai Clan (ぬらりひょんの孫)	Hiroshi Shiibashi	May 2023	August 2023
Love Live! Flowers: Hasunosora Girls' School Idol Club (ラブライブ! flowers＊ー蓮ノ空女学院スクールアイドルクラブー)	Tsumumi	December 2023	Present
Josou Danshi wa Skirt o Nugitai! (女装男子はスカートを脱ぎたい!)	Shinagire	January 2024	October 2026
Itoko no Oneechan ni Amaechau? (いとこのお姉ちゃんに甘えちゃう?)	Kyouhei Igarashi	June 2024	Present
Baby Road Trippers (ベイビー車中ハッカーズ)	Tabireco	September 2024	Present
Bug Ego (バグエゴ)	One, Kiyoto Shitara	November 2024	Present
Konzukushi (こんづくし)	Ayami Morinaga	May 2025	Present

== Ultra Jump Egg ==
Title	Illustrator/Author
Hana-Yome Han (花ヨメはん)	Yukimaru Katsura
Kinnikuman Lady (キン肉マンレディー)	Masashi Ogawa, Yudetamago (writer)
Akira The Strongest Magical Girl (最強魔法少女あきら)	RCO Wada
peach fight!	Yoko Imamura
Etwas Abteilung für Kultur (文化部をいくつか)	F4U
Rakkasan Nurse (落下傘ナース)	Miki Rinno
Labian Extase (ラビアンエクスタス)	Mario Kaneda, Toshiki Inōe (writer)
Fighting Librarians: Book of Bantorra (戦う司書と恋する爆弾)	Konotsu Shinohara, Ishio Ymagata (writer), Shigeki Maeshima (character design)
13club	Tatsutya Shihira
Neko kyū 9 (ねこ球9)	Kaishaku
Guǐ Chuī Dēng ~Dragon Sign~ (鬼吹灯 ～ドラゴンサイン～)	Yao Fei-La
Tetsuman TEKKEN COMIC (鉄漫 TEKKEN COMIC)	Rui Takato, Namco Bandai Games (Creator/Supervisor)
