= Bastard!! =

Japanese manga series by Kazushi Hagiwara

- Bastard!! Heavy Metal, Dark Fantasy
- First tankōbon volume cover, featuring Dark Schneider (right) and Tia Noto Yoko (center)

BASTARD!! -暗黒の破壊神- (Basutādo!! Ankoku no Hakaishin)
- Genre: Dark fantasy; Post-apocalyptic; Sword and sorcery
- Manga
- Written by: Kazushi Hagiwara
- Published by: Shueisha
- English publisher: NA: Viz Media
- Imprint: Jump Comics
- Magazine: Weekly Shōnen Jump (1988–1989, 1997–2000); Weekly Shōnen Jump Specials (1990–1996); Ultra Jump (2000–2010)
- Original run: March 14, 1988 – present (Note: The manga has been on indefinite hiatus since its last published chapter on May 19, 2010.)
- Volumes: 27
- Original video animation
- Directed by: Katsuhito Akiyama
- Produced by: Tetsuo Daitoku; Toru Miura
- Written by: Hiroshi Yamaguchi
- Music by: Kohei Tanaka
- Studio: AIC
- Licensed by: NA: Pioneer Entertainment
- Released: August 25, 1992 – June 25, 1993
- Runtime: 30 minutes (each)
- Episodes: 6
- Original net animation
- Directed by: Takaharu Ozaki
- Produced by: Toshiyasu Hayashi; Shinya Tsuruoka; Souji Miyagi (S1); Fumihiro Ozawa (S2)
- Written by: Yōsuke Kuroda
- Music by: Yasuharu Takanashi
- Studio: Liden Films
- Licensed by: Netflix: NA: Sentai Filmworks
- Released: June 30, 2022 – July 31, 2023
- Episodes: 39
- icon

Bastard!! Heavy Metal, Dark Fantasy (Japanese: BASTARD!! -暗黒の破壊神-, Hepburn: Basutādo!! Ankoku no Hakaishin; lit. 'Bastard!! The Dark God of Destruction') is a Japanese manga series written and illustrated by Kazushi Hagiwara. It began its serialization in Shueisha's shōnen manga magazine Weekly Shōnen Jump in 1988, after debuting with a pilot one-shot in that magazine in 1987, and has continued irregularly in the seinen manga magazine Ultra Jump since 2000, with its latest chapter released in 2010. As of 2012, 27 collected tankōbon volumes have been released. The pilot one-shot was remade by Tatsuya Shihara and published in Ultra Jump in July 2023. The manga was formerly licensed for English release in North America by Viz Media; only the first 19 volumes were released.

Hagiwara is an enthusiastic fan of heavy metal music and Dungeons & Dragons, using ideas from both of these in the Bastard!! story. Many characters and places in the story, for instance, are named after members of Hagiwara's favorite bands.

The manga was adapted into a six-episode original video animation (OVA) series by AIC, released from 1992 to 1993. The OVA was released in North America by Pioneer in 1998. An original net animation (ONA) adaptation of the same name, by Liden Films, premiered on Netflix worldwide in June 2022. The second season premiered in July 2023.

Bastard!! is one of Shueisha's best-selling manga series of all time, with over 30 million copies in circulation.

== Overview ==
Four centuries ago, Earth suffered a cataclysm caused by the demon Anthrasax before she was slain by the Dragon Knight, plunging the world into a new Dark Age. In the present, the Kingdom of Metallicana is attacked by the Dark Rebel Army who seek to resurrect Anthrasax. This prompts the high priest to ask his daughter to awaken Dark Schneider, a dark wizard and founding leader of the Dark Rebel Army who reincarnated himself within the body of 15-year-old Lucien Renlen. In time, Dark's allies learn of his true nature and ties to the calamity that befell the Old World.

Bastard!!'s history is about sorcery, revenge, and other power struggles in a Dungeons & Dragons–like world. It is a dystopian world where people need magic to survive against wild beasts and evil monsters. There are four kingdoms, each one the protector of one of the four seals that keep the God of Destruction in stasis.

== Production ==
Kazushi Hagiwara aspired to become a manga artist after reading Go Nagai's Devilman and popular shōnen manga magazines during his youth. Following his departure from high school, he served as an assistant to Izumi Matsumoto on the Weekly Shōnen Jump series Kimagure Orange Road at Shueisha, concurrently developing his own one-shot stories. In 1987, Hagiwara contributed to a Shueisha initiative designed to showcase new artists. His dark fantasy one-shot Wizard!! Bakuen no Seifukusha (WIZARD!!〜爆炎の征服者〜; "Wizard: Conqueror of Explosive Flames") was selected, performed favorably in reader surveys, and earned a weekly serialization. Hagiwara subsequently adapted the sword and sorcery setting and characters from Wizard!! for the newly titled Bastard!!, which debuted in Shōnen Jump in 1988.

From the manga's inception, Hagiwara integrated scriptwriting, storyboarding, and artwork into a single process. He estimated dividing his time equally between illustrations and dialogue, completing up to three pages daily. The initial chapters, which comprised the first few tankōbon volumes, were produced solely by Hagiwara on a demanding weekly schedule. He concluded that while he could work faster to complete more volumes, the perceived artistic quality would decline under strict deadlines. A team of up to six assistants at his studio aided with backgrounds, inking, and screentone application. The series later transitioned to a less frequent publication schedule in other Shueisha magazines. With more time between chapters, Hagiwara assumed greater responsibility for the artwork rather than delegating it to assistants. Beginning during his tenure as an assistant, Hagiwara employed extensive screentone for character shadows, background shading, and effects to create a three-dimensional appearance. He instructed his assistants in this technique and increased its use after the magazine transition. Hagiwara also referenced cosplay photographs and his extensive figurine collection to achieve a more realistic aesthetic. He experimented with digital coloring for the series but predominantly used analog methods with Pantone and Copic markers.

In addition to the significant influence of Devilman, Hagiwara derived inspiration for the fantasy setting of Bastard!! from role-playing video games such as the Dragon Quest series and gamebooks, particularly the Fighting Fantasy series by Steve Jackson and Ian Livingstone. As an avid anime enthusiast, he attempted to emulate the styles of contemporary artists and animators he admired. Primary influences on the character designs included Naoyuki Onda, Hiroyuki Kitatsumi, Tomonori Kogawa, and Mutsumi Inomata. Kitatsumi later contributed to the character designs for the Bastard!! anime OVA, while Onda illustrated the adaptation's DVD covers. Hagiwara had studied and replicated Kogawa's distinctive cel art style for years; the character Princess Sheila was conceived due to his appreciation for Ciela from Aura Battler Dunbine, a series on which Kogawa worked. Locations, spells, and certain characters in Bastard!! are directly named after hard rock and heavy metal bands, including Bon Jovi, Accept, Stryper, Metallica, Judas Priest, Whitesnake, Anthrax, Megadeth, Venom, Guns N' Roses, Black Sabbath, and Helloween.

The manga is published on an irregular schedule. Its latest chapter was published in Shueisha's Ultra Jump magazine on May 19, 2010. In a 2023 interview, Hagiwara stated that he had been working on storyboards for the continuation of the manga's Hell story arc, but attributed the lack of progress to his perception that something about it was not working. He added that he was able to conceive narratives set a century or more in the past, and that he made a point of recording those ideas in a notebook to preserve them, noting that he would eventually need to give them form as well. He further remarked that his creative energy as a writer was actually increasing, and reaffirmed his sincerity in wanting to deliver the work to readers someday. He expressed his aspiration that, when completed, the project would be groundbreaking enough to prompt reactions such as, "Is this really Bastard!!?"

== Media ==
=== Manga ===
Written and illustrated by Kazushi Hagiwara, Bastard!! was preceded by a pilot chapter, titled Wizard!! Bakuen no Seifukusha, published in Shueisha's shōnen manga magazine Weekly Shōnen Jump in 1987. Bastard!! began serialization in the same magazine on March 14, 1988, and ran on a regular basis in the magazine until August 21, 1989. The first tankōbon volume was published on August 10, 1988. The series was then switched to the Weekly Shōnen Jump Specials quarterly magazine, where it ran on an irregular basis. It was later published again in Weekly Shōnen Jump, on an irregular "monthly" basis, from 1997 to 2000. The series was transferred to the seinen manga magazine Ultra Jump, starting on December 19, 2000. Twenty-seven volumes have been released as of March 2012. Shueisha re-released the series in a new kanzenban-like edition, titled Bastard!! Complete Edition. The first volume updates Hagiwara's art style, improving backgrounds, screentones and includes redrawing of some characters. The second volume is fully redrawn and includes a graphic sex scene not included in the original release. Further volumes are unchanged. Volumes were released from December 2000 to December 2009. In 2014, Shueisha released a nine-volume bunkoban edition from May to September.

In North America, Viz Media announced the license of Bastard!! in July 2001. The Viz edition is based on Bastard!! Complete Edition. Viz edition differs in a few ways from Japan release. Including graphic sexual scenes being censored, the major differences are the changing of location named after real-life bands. Viz Media (and Pioneer for the OVA adaptation) took the Japanese transliterations of these band names and changed them somewhat, then transliterating them back to English, e.g., Anthrax became "Anthrasax", Iron Maiden into "Aian Meide", and the main city in which the story takes place, Metallicana, was changed to "Meta-Rikana". Viz Media published the first five volumes in a left-to-right edition from August 2002 to December 2003. The volumes were later republished in its original right-to-left version starting from November 2003. The manga stopped its publication after the release of volume 19 in September 2009.

A 51-page reboot of the pilot chapter, Wizard!! Bakuen no Seifukusha, illustrated by Tatsuya Shihara, was published in Ultra Jump on July 29, 2023.

==== Volumes ====
No.	Title	Original release date	English release date
1	The Dark Rebel Armies—Part I	August 10, 1988; 978-4-08-871063-1	August 5, 2002 (LR); November 5, 2003 (RL); 978-1-59116-002-1 (LR); 978-1-56931-952-9 (RL)
2	The Dark Rebel Armies—Part II	November 10, 1988; 978-4-08-871064-8	November 5, 2002 (LR); December 1, 2003 (RL); 978-1-56931-769-3 (LR); 978-1-56931-968-0 (RL)
3	The Dark Rebel Armies—Part III	January 10, 1989; 978-4-08-871065-5	March 1, 2003 (LR); March 1, 2004 (RL); 978-1-56931-861-4 (LR); 978-1-59116-247-6 (RL)
4	The Dark Rebel Armies—Part IV	March 10, 1989; 978-4-08-871066-2	September 5, 2003 (LR); July 7, 2004 (RL); 978-1-56931-826-3 (LR); 978-1-59116-326-8 (RL)
5	The Dark Rebel Armies—Part V	May 10, 1989; 978-4-08-871067-9	December 11, 2003 (LR); October 12, 2004 (RL); 978-1-59116-092-2 (LR); 978-1-59116-506-4 (RL)
6	The Dark Rebel Armies—Part VI	September 8, 1989; 978-4-08-871068-6	January 11, 2005; 978-1-59116-134-9
7	The Dark Rebel Armies—Part VII	November 10, 1989; 978-4-08-871069-3	April 12, 2005; 978-1-59116-742-6
8	Hell's Requiem—Part I	June 8, 1990; 978-4-08-871070-9	July 12, 2005; 978-1-59116-837-9
9	Hell's Requiem—Part II	November 9, 1990; 978-4-08-871831-6	October 11, 2005; 978-1-4215-0050-8
10	Hell's Requiem—Part III	July 10, 1991; 978-4-08-871832-3	January 10, 2006; 978-1-4215-0219-9
11	Hell's Requiem—Part IV	February 10, 1992; 978-4-08-871833-0	April 11, 2006; 978-1-4215-0379-0
12	Hell's Requiem—Part V	July 3, 1992; 978-4-08-871834-7	July 11, 2006; 978-1-4215-0434-6
13	Crimes & Punishment—Part I	March 4, 1993; 978-4-08-871835-4	October 10, 2006; 978-1-4215-0435-3
14	Crimes & Punishment—Part II	October 4, 1993; 978-4-08-871836-1	January 9, 2007; 978-1-4215-0436-0
15	Crimes & Punishment—Part III	June 3, 1994; 978-4-08-871837-8	July 10, 2007; 978-1-4215-0878-8
16	Crimes & Punishment—Part IV	March 3, 1995; 978-4-08-871838-5	January 8, 2008; 978-1-4215-0879-5
17	Crimes & Punishment—Part V	May 10, 1996; 978-4-08-872241-2	July 8, 2008; 978-1-4215-0880-1
18	Crimes & Punishment—Part VI	November 1, 1996; 978-4-08-872242-9	January 13, 2009; 978-1-4215-1600-4
19	Immoral Laws—Part I	March 4, 1998; 978-4-08-872243-6	September 8, 2009; 978-1-4215-2195-4
20	Immoral Laws—Part II	December 3, 1998; 978-4-08-872651-9	January 12, 2010 (canceled); 978-1-4215-2883-0
21	Immoral Laws—Part III	September 3, 1999; 978-4-08-872759-2	—
22	Immoral Laws—Part IV	June 4, 2001; 978-4-08-873131-5	—
23	Immoral Laws—Part V	April 30, 2004; 978-4-08-873563-4	—
24	Immoral Laws—Part VI	July 4, 2006; 978-4-08-873877-2	—
25	Immoral Laws—Part VII	April 4, 2008; 978-4-08-874492-6	—
26	Immoral Laws—Part VIII	June 4, 2009; 978-4-08-874672-2	—
27	The Tomb of Spells—Part I	March 19, 2012; 978-4-08-870171-4	—

=== Original video animation ===
A six-episode original video animation (OVA) series by AIC was released between August 25, 1992, and June 25, 1993. The OVA cover the story up through the Four Lords of Havoc's battle against Abigail (volumes 6–7 of the manga).

In North America, Pioneer Entertainment released the series on three VHS set tapes with an English dub between August 28 and December 8, 1998. Pioneer re-released the OVA on DVD on June 5, 2001.

No.	Title	Original release date
1	"The Explosive Wizard"; Transliteration: "Bakuen no Majutsu-shi" (Japanese: 爆炎の魔術師)	August 25, 1992
The Lords of Havoc (Arshes Nei, Abigail, Gara, and Kall-Su) seek four seals to awaken Anthrasax, the God of Destruction, to wipe out the world and create a new one to rule and have already acquired one. The wizard Kevidubu attacks the kingdom of Metallicana with his army and his pet Hydra. While taking shelter in the castle, the High Priest Geo explains to his daughter Tia Noto Yoko that the spirit of the evil wizard Dark Schneider is sealed inside her adoptive brother Lucien and he can be awoken with a virgin's kiss. To save everyone, Yoko kisses Lucien despite her embarrassment and he transforms into Dark Schneider. He refuses to help and attacks Geo to seek revenge for Geo helping to kill him 15 years ago. Kevidubu and the Hydra break into the castle. DS is furious that the debris almost hit Yoko and easily kills the two, then wipes out his army. DS then resumes his attack on Geo, making Yoko cry and beg him to stop. To soothe her, he declares his love for her and kisses her, but this makes him revert to Lucien, who has no memory of what happened. Gara senses DS' return.
2	"Efreet the Fire Elemental"; Transliteration: "Kaen Majin Ifurīto" (Japanese: 火炎魔神イーフリート)	October 25, 1992
Gara infiltrates the castle to abduct Yoko. Dark Schneider possesses Lucien's body while he is asleep and tries to intervene, but Lucien wakes up, allowing Gara to escape with Yoko. Since only DS knows where Gara's fortress is, Princess Sheila kisses Lucien to transform him. DS and Sheila lead her knights on a rescue mission, but DS makes Sheila remove her armor when it slows her down, leaving her in a skimpy outfit. Gara interrogates Yoko on how to awaken DS and taunts her by saying DS is over 400 years old and has been with hundreds of women, so she is not special. He then uses a clothes-eating slime creature to strip her naked. The knights distract a Minotaur guard while DS and Sheila move ahead. She is embarrassed at having to climb a ladder in her short skirt, so DS carries her on his shoulders. DS kills a monster called a Suzuki Dogezaemon. Sheila touches a cursed sword that makes her slash DS with its poisoned blade, forcing her to suck out the poison. The sword then turns into Efreet the Fire Elemental and attacks them. Gara boasts Efreet is the counter to DS' fire spells, but DS kills him with a fire spell as hot as the sun. Efreet reverts to a sword and DS claims it.
3	"Ninja Master Gara"; Transliteration: "Ninja Masutā Gara" (Japanese: ニンジャマスター・ガラ)	December 10, 1992
Dark Schneider and Sheila arrive in the main room. DS is furious that Yoko is suspended from the ceiling naked and Gara boasts that he will make her his woman and attacks Gara, but he is still tired from fighting Efreet and Gara gets the advantage. Sheila gets to Yoko and covers her with a blanket. Gara recalls how DS invaded his country. Gara tried to assassinate him while he was sleeping with Arshes but failed. He asked why DS conquers and he answered that he wanted to eliminate any threats and rule the world so he could claim any woman he wants. Impressed by his strength, Gara joined him. In the present, Gara is disgusted with how weak DS is and slices off his hand, but DS blasts off his in return. Gara then slices him in half and gloats, but DS heals himself and collapses the entire fortress, protecting everyone with forcefields. DS then heals Gara's hand and a grateful Gara rejoins his side. Yoko chastises DS for taking so long and making her worry, while Sheila is amazed that he protected everyone and thinks he is not so evil.
4	"The Immortal King Di-Amon"; Transliteration: "Fushi-ō Dai-Amon" (Japanese: 不死王 ダイ・アモン)	February 25, 1993
Dark Schneider left Metallicana accompanied by Gara's pet baby dragon, the reincarnation of Prince Lars, who fought DS to a mutual kill 15 years ago. Yoko and a squad of female knights pursue him. Arshes' troops attack Metallicana. DS enters her dream and seduces her as they recall how he adopted her and they became lovers when she came of age. However, she attacks him and DS is weakened enough to revert to Lucien. It is revealed Abigail and Kall-Su cursed Arshes to force her to attack DS. Yoko's entourage is attacked by a werewolf and she is chased off a cliff, lands in a river, and meets Lucien. The vampire Di-Amon, who owns the werewolf, captures them and her entourage and takes them to his castle. He locks Lucien and Lars in a cage and dresses the girls in skimpy outfits to prepare to drain their blood. After he drains the knights and goes after Yoko, DS is angered enough to transform. He tricks Di-Amon into killing the werewolf, then breaks the wall to let the sunlight in. Di-Amon survives by turning into a bat, but DS curses him to obey him or else he will turn into a toad. Geo visits a fortune teller who sees a vision of DS with his heart ripped out of his chest. DS returns to Metallicana and blasts Arshes' troops.
5	"Thunder Empress Arshes Nei"; Transliteration: "Kaminari Mikado Āshesu Nei" (Japanese: 雷帝アーシェス・ネイ)	April 25, 1993
Arshes blasts the castle with lightning and Dark Schneider rescues Yoko and Sheila. Angered at seeing him with other women and wary of the curse, Arshes challenges him to a duel. She temporarily negates his magic, but the spirit of Efreet sacrifices himself and his sword form to destroy her lightning sword. DS tries to remind her of their love, but she attacks again. Abigail gloats that either she kills DS or the curse kills her. Arshes boasts she will create a new world without poverty where no one will be orphaned like she was, which he dismisses as a childish fantasy. When she threatens Yoko, an enraged DS attacks her full force. However, Lucien's consciousness alerts him to the curse on Arshes. Now realizing she was forced to attack him, DS sacrifices himself by ripping his own heart out of his chest, nullifying the curse. As he collapses, everyone cries over him.
6	"The Return of Dark Schneider"; Transliteration: "Fukkatsu no Dāku Shunaidā" (Japanese: 復活のダーク・シュナイダー)	June 25, 1993
Dark Schneider is laid to rest in a church. Abigail and Kall-Su conquer other kingdoms and get the other two seals and the last one is in Metallicana, so they send their troops to attack it. The king reveals the final seal is inside Sheila's body and Geo must kill her if they lose. Abigail breaks the other three seals to partially awaken Anthrasax, causing Sheila great pain. Arshes defends the kingdom to honor DS, learning that Abigail only wanted to destroy the world without making it a paradise. Abigail summons a powerful Cyclops from Anthrasax's flesh and Arshes is no match until Gara and his troops show up to help. However, the Cyclops wipes out his troops and regenerates from their attacks. DS' heart regenerates, but he does not revive until Yoko slaps him awake. He joins the battle and quickly obliterates the Cyclops and Abigail. Yoko and Arshes happily reunite with him and Sheila is feeling better. Dark Schneider declares that with Arshes and Gara at his side, he cannot lose. As Anthrasax goes back to sleep, Kall-Su swears revenge.

=== Original net animation ===
An original net animation (ONA) adaptation by Liden Films was announced on February 3, 2022. The 24-episode ONA is directed by Takaharu Ozaki, with scripts written by Yōsuke Kuroda, character designs by Sayaka Ono, and music composed by Yasuharu Takanashi. The first 13 episodes were released worldwide on Netflix on June 30, 2022, while the remaining 11 episodes were released on September 15 of the same year. The opening theme is "Bloody Power Fame" by Coldrain, while the ending theme is "Blessless" by Tielle. In Japan, the ONA series began a televised broadcast on BS11 on January 11, 2023. (Note: BS11 listed the premiere for the series on Tuesday at 25:00, which is effectively Wednesday at 1:00 a.m. JST.)

A second season was announced on January 9, 2023. It premiered on Netflix on July 31, 2023, consisting of 15 episodes. The opening theme is "New Dawn" by Coldrain, while the ending theme is "La Muse Perdue" by Tielle. The second season began broadcasting on BS11 and other networks on January 3, 2024; (Note: BS11 listed the premiere for the series on Tuesday at 24:00, which is effectively Wednesday at midnight JST.) the first three episodes aired as a 90-minute special.

The series' first season was released on a Blu-ray Disc set in North America by Sentai Filmworks on January 21, 2025.

=== Video games ===
A 1994 Bastard!! 3D fighting game was released for Super Famicom. A role-playing video game with turn-based fighting elements, titled Bastard!! -Utsuro Naru Kamigami no Utsuwa- (BASTARD!! -虚ろなる神々の器-), was released for PlayStation on December 27, 1996.

A MMOG platformer called Bastard!! Online was also in development by the Japanese publisher Tecmo and software developer Shaft. A beta test was released in 2006; however, Tecmo announced that they had canceled its development in December 2009.

== Reception and legacy ==
Bastard!! is one of Shueisha's best-selling manga series of all time, with over 30 million copies in circulation.

Video game designer and producer Daisuke Ishiwatari said Bastard!!'s fantasy setting was a major influence on creating Guilty Gear.
