= Bug Ego =

Japanese manga series

- First tankōbon volume cover

バグエゴ (Bagu Ego)
- Genre: Mystery
- Manga
- Written by: One
- Illustrated by: Kiyoto Shitara
- Published by: Shueisha
- English publisher: NA: Viz Media
- Imprint: Young Jump Comics
- Magazine: Young Jump Dai Ichiwa (2023, 2024); Ultra Jump (2024–present)
- Original run: April 27, 2023 – present
- Volumes: 4
- icon

Bug Ego (Japanese: バグエゴ, Hepburn: Bagu Ego) is a Japanese manga series written by One and illustrated by Kiyoto Shitara. First published for two chapters in Young Jump Dai Ichiwa—a supplement magazine of Shueisha's seinen manga magazine Weekly Young Jump—in April 2023 and January 2024, the manga began a regular serialization in the publisher's Ultra Jump magazine in October 2024.

== Synopsis ==
The series follows two Japanese high schoolers: the socially inept and physically diminutive Takehiro Kokudo, and the charismatic, empathetic Makoto Hitsujia. Takehiro finds and eventually shares a mysterious notebook with Makoto, which details various bugs in reality, bizarre actions or events which result in otherwise unexplained phenomena. The two resolve to work together to experience and document the effects of the bugs, often dealing with the fallout suffered by failing to heed the warnings detailed in the book. The two are later joined by Hashira Yuki, a highly competent yet overworked classmate who seeks to regain the lost joy of her youth.

== Publication ==
Written by One and illustrated by Kiyoto Shitara, Bug Ego was first published in Shueisha's Weekly Young Jump's supplement magazine Young Jump Dai Ichiwa (Young Jump Chapter One) on April 27, 2023; the magazine features "first chapters" of potential manga series, allowing readers to vote on which ones should be serialized in the main magazine, and while Bug Ego was not part of that contest, a "first chapter" was published in the supplement magazine. A second chapter was published in the same magazine on January 18, 2024. The manga started a regular serialization in the publisher's Ultra Jump magazine on October 19, 2024. Shueisha has collected its chapters into individual tankōbon volumes, with its first two released on February 18, 2025. As of June 18, 2026, four volumes have been released.

In North America, Viz Media started publishing the manga digitally on its Shonen Jump service on November 18, 2024. In June 2025, Viz Media announced that it would publish the volumes in both physical and digital format. The first volume was released on April 21, 2026.

=== Volumes ===
No.	Original release date	Original ISBN	English release date	English ISBN
1	February 18, 2025	978-4-08-893610-9	April 21, 2026	978-1-9747-6264-4
2	February 18, 2025	978-4-08-893611-6	July 21, 2026	978-1-9747-6407-5
3	November 19, 2025	978-4-08-893788-5	November 17, 2026	978-1-9747-6855-4
4	June 18, 2026	978-4-08-894257-5	—	—
5	December 17, 2026	978-4-08-894426-5	—	—

== Reception ==
Viz Media's English release was nominated for Best New Manga at the third American Manga Awards, co-organized by Anime NYC and Japan Society in 2026.

== See also ==
- Katagimodoshi, another manga series by Kiyoto Shitara
