= Ad Astra: Scipio and Hannibal =

Japanese manga series

- First tankōbon volume cover

アド・アストラ -スキピオとハンニバル- (Ado Asutora Sukipio to Hannibaru)
- Genre: Epic; Historical
- Manga
- Written by: Mihachi Kagano
- Published by: Shueisha
- Magazine: Ultra Jump
- Original run: March 19, 2011 – January 19, 2018
- Volumes: 13

Ad Astra: Scipio and Hannibal (Japanese: アド・アストラ -スキピオとハンニバル-, Hepburn: Ado Asutora Sukipio to Hannibaru) is a Japanese manga series written and illustrated by Mihachi Kagano. It was serialized in Shueisha's seinen manga magazine Ultra Jump from March 2011 to January 2018, with its chapters collected in thirteen tankōbon volumes.

== Publication ==
Written and illustrated by Mihachi Kagano, Ad Astra: Scipio and Hannibal was serialized in Shueisha's seinen manga magazine Ultra Jump from March 19, 2011, to January 19, 2018. Shueisha collected its chapters in thirteen tankōbon volumes, released from October 19, 2011, to March 19, 2018.

=== Volumes ===
No.	Release date	ISBN
1	October 19, 2011	978-4-08-879207-1
2	May 18, 2012	978-4-08-879338-2
3	November 19, 2012	978-4-08-879463-1
4	June 19, 2013	978-4-08-879567-6
5	February 19, 2014	978-4-08-879742-7
6	August 20, 2014	978-4-08-890003-2
7	March 19, 2015	978-4-08-890135-0
8	September 18, 2015	978-4-08-890260-9
9	March 18, 2016	978-4-08-890378-1
10	September 16, 2016	978-4-08-890501-3
11	March 17, 2017	978-4-08-890615-7
12	September 19, 2017	978-4-08-890747-5
13	March 19, 2018	978-4-08-890884-7
