= Katagimodoshi =

Japanese manga series

- Fifth tankōbon volume cover

カタギモドシ
- Genre: Action; Drama; Suspense
- Manga
- Written by: Kiyoto Shitara
- Published by: Shueisha
- Imprint: Young Jump Comics
- Magazine: Weekly Young Jump
- Original run: July 7, 2022 – December 21, 2023
- Volumes: 5

Katagimodoshi (Japanese: カタギモドシ) is a Japanese manga series written and illustrated by Kiyoto Shitara. It was serialized in Shueisha's seinen manga magazine Weekly Young Jump from July 2022 to December 2023, with its chapters collected in five tankōbon volumes.

== Publication ==
Written and illustrated by Kiyoto Shitara, Katagimodoshi was serialized in Shueisha's seinen manga magazine Weekly Young Jump from July 7, 2022, (Note: It started in the magazine's 32nd issue of 2022, which was released on July 7.) to December 21, 2023. (Note: It finished in the magazine's combined 3-4th issue of 2024, which was released on December 21, 2023.) Shueisha collected its chapters in five tankōbon volumes, published from November 17, 2022, to January 18, 2024.

=== Volumes ===
No.	Release date	ISBN
1	November 17, 2022	978-4-08-892491-5
2	March 17, 2023	978-4-08-892655-1
3	July 19, 2023	978-4-08-892762-6
4	January 18, 2024	978-4-08-892898-2
5	January 18, 2024	978-4-08-893108-1

== Reception ==
The series was recommended by manga authors Satoru Noda and One, with a comment featured on the obi of the first volume.
