= Tenkaichi: The Greatest Warrior Under the Rising Sun =

Japanese manga series

- First tankōbon volume cover, features Honda Tadakatsu (left) and Miyamoto Musashi (right)

テンカイチ 日本最強武芸者決定戦 (Tenkaichi: Nihon Saikyō Bugeisha Ketteisen)
- Genre: Historical; Martial arts
- Manga
- Written by: Yōsuke Nakamaru
- Illustrated by: Kyōtarō Azuma
- Published by: Kodansha
- English publisher: Kodansha (digital)
- Imprint: Young Magazine KC Special
- Magazine: Young Magazine the 3rd (January 6 – April 6, 2021); Monthly Young Magazine (May 20, 2021 – present)
- Original run: January 6, 2021 – present
- Volumes: 14
- Anime television series
- Directed by: Masashi Abe
- Written by: Kazuharu Sato
- Music by: Hayato Matsuo
- Studio: Fugaku
- Original run: April 2027 – scheduled
- icon

Tenkaichi: The Greatest Warrior Under the Rising Sun (テンカイチ 日本最強武芸者決定戦, Tenkaichi: Nihon Saikyō Bugeisha Ketteisen) is a Japanese manga series written by Yōsuke Nakamaru and illustrated by Kyōtarō Azuma. It began serialization on Kodansha's Young Magazine the 3rd manga magazine in January 2021. After the disbandment of the former manga magazine, it was later transferred to Monthly Young Magazine in May the same year. An anime television series adaptation produced by Fugaku is set to premiere in April 2027.

== Plot ==
In an alternate history, Oda Nobunaga succeeded in unifying Japan. Ten years into his reign in the year 1600, he reveals he is dying of a terminal illness. Wanting to see spectacular battles before he dies, he holds a tournament to determine his successor. Sixteen warlords enter, but have champions compete in their place, sixteen of the greatest warriors of Japan. It is a single elimination tournament where anything goes and death is encouraged.

== Characters ==
Miyamoto Musashi (宮本 武蔵)
Voiced by: Gen Satō
Honda Tadakatsu (本多 忠勝)
Voiced by: Kenichirou Matsuda
Oda Nobunaga (織田 信長)
Voiced by: Kenyu Horiuchi

== Media ==
=== Manga ===
Written by Yōsuke Nakamaru and illustrated by Kyōtarō Azuma, Tenkaichi: Nihon Saikyō Bugeisha Ketteisen was initially serialized in Kodansha's Young Magazine the 3rd from January 6 to April 6, 2021, when the magazine released its final issue. It was later transferred to Monthly Young Magazine beginning on May 20 that same year. Its chapters have been collected into fourteen tankōbon volumes as of August 2026.

The series is published in English on Kodansha's K Manga app.

No.	Release date	ISBN
1	June 18, 2021	978-4-06-523030-5
2	September 17, 2021	978-4-06-524755-6
3	January 20, 2022	978-4-06-526737-0
4	May 6, 2022	978-4-06-527783-6
5	September 20, 2022	978-4-06-529071-2
6	January 19, 2023	978-4-06-530417-4
7	July 20, 2023	978-4-06-532348-9
8	December 20, 2023	978-4-06-534077-6
9	May 20, 2024	978-4-06-535649-4
10	November 20, 2024	978-4-06-537517-4
11	April 18, 2025	978-4-06-539238-6
12	September 19, 2025	978-4-06-540971-8
13	February 19, 2026	978-4-06-542554-1
14	August 20, 2026	978-4-06-544590-7

=== Anime ===
An anime television series adaptation was announced on April 11, 2025. It will be produced by Fugaku and directed by Masashi Abe, with series composition handled by Kazuharu Sato, characters designed by Ryōji Nakamori, and music composed by Hayato Matsuo. The series is set to premiere in April 2027.

== Reception ==
The series was nominated for the eighth Next Manga Awards in the print category in 2022.

== See also ==
- Gamaran, another manga series written by Yōsuke Nakamaru
- Versus, another manga series illustrated by Kyōtarō Azuma
