= Gamaran =

Japanese manga series by Yousuke Nakamaru

- First tankōbon volume cover

我間乱
- Genre: Adventure; Historical; Martial arts
- Manga
- Written by: Yousuke Nakamaru
- Published by: Kodansha
- English publisher: NA: Kodansha USA
- Magazine: Weekly Shōnen Magazine
- Original run: May 13, 2009 – June 26, 2013
- Volumes: 22
- Manga

Gamaran: Shura
- Written by: Yousuke Nakamaru
- Published by: Kodansha
- English publisher: NA: Kodansha USA
- Magazine: Magazine Pocket
- Original run: March 7, 2018 – February 27, 2025
- Volumes: 35
- icon

Gamaran (我間乱; 'Gama's Uprising') is a Japanese manga series written and illustrated by Yousuke Nakamaru. It was serialized in Kodansha's shōnenmanga magazine Weekly Shōnen Magazine from May 2009 to June 2013, with its chapters collected in twenty-two tankōbon volumes. The series chronicles the adventures of Gama Kurogane as he competes in the Grand Tournament of Unabara. Facing many opponents with powerful weapons and techniques, Gama must use all his skills in his quest to become the greatest swordsman in the land.

== Plot ==
Middle Edo Period—One state becomes the gathering place for martial artists, who believe in nothing other than power, knowing no other way-of-life than letting oneself go wild in battle. That powerful state is Unabara, the "Haunt of Demons".

Naosata Washitzu, the daimyo of Unabara, is looking for his successor. Calling upon his 31 sons, he tells them to search for whomever they believe to be the strongest martial arts style in the land. Once these 31 styles have been chosen, a great competition called "The Grand Tournament of Unabara" will be held. Pitting themselves against each other, these fighting styles will battle until one emerges victorious. The winner shall be known as the 'strongest fighters in the land', and the son who sponsored them shall become the Daimyo's successor.

In the mountains of Unabara lies the doujo of the "Ogame Ryū" (Giant Tortoise Style). There, Naoyoshi Washitzu, one of the 31 sons of Naosata Washitzu, comes in search of the legendary swordsman, Jinsuke Kurogane, the man known as "The Thousand Man Slayer". When he arrives he discovers that Jinsuke has disappeared and not been seen for several years. Instead he encounters Jinsuke's son, Gama Kurogane. After testing Gama's fighting style and skills, Naoyoshi invites Gama to fight for him in the upcoming tournament. Desiring to become stronger, Gama agrees to his offer, and here marks the beginning of Gama's quest to become the strongest of all.

=== The Grand Tournament of Unabara ===
- Round One – The 31 styles will be split into eight groups with 4 to 5 styles per group. For one month the styles in each group will battle each other in whichever way they please, be it one-on-one or an all-out-brawl. When the leader of a style admits defeat, they may be beheaded or spared by the victor. At the end of the month, the style that emerges victorious from each group will move on to the second round.
- Round Two – The 10 victorious styles from the first round will battle each other at the same time. The condition for victory against another style will be taking the head of the Daimyo's son who sponsored that style. There is no limit on how many heads can be taken, however, only one head needs to be presented in order for a style to move on to the third round.

== Characters ==
=== Protagonists ===
Naoyoshi Washitzu (鷲津直善, Washizu Naoyoshi)
The 28th son of Daimyo Washitzu Naosata and sponsor of the "Ogame Ryū" school. Naoyoshi is very determined to find the strongest martial artist to represent him in the Grand Tournament. Because his mother was a commoner, Naoyoshi has been mistreated and disrespected by his other brothers all his life. This treatment compels Naoyoshi to win the Grand Tournament so that he can change his own destiny.

Ogame Ryū ("Giant Tortoise Style") – A martial arts school that specializes in Battōjutsu. The techniques of the Ogame Style are divided into five forms, each based on a different element (Fire, Water, Lightning, Earth, and Wind).

Gama Kurogane (黒鉄我間, Kurogane Gama)
The teenage son of the legendary swordsman, Jinsuke Kurogane, and youngest student of the Ogame Style. Gama displayed incredible talent and skill by easily defeating a pair of mercenaries Naoyoshi brought to test the Ogame Style. Possessing a highly competitive personality, Gama is attracted to tournament not only to prove his own strength, but to find and confront his father. In addition to his formidable sword skills, Gama also possesses a quick mind, allowing his to constantly adjust and evolve during his battles. Due to his small stature Gama does not possess a lot of physical strength, relying instead on his agility. Gama favors the Ogame Ryū's Lightning Katas, which emphasize quick movements and high-speed attacks.Gama is desperate to kill his father Jinsuke because he betrayed the Ogame school and killed his fellow friends and clan mates. After 1 year of training he grew stronger and mastered some skills. Commander of the 11th corps was easily defeated by Gama. He got the ability of seeing all the attacks by observing movements of the opponent.
Shinnojou Sakura (桜 真ノ丞, Sakura Shinnojō)
A student of the Ogame School who returns to Unabara in time to participate in the tournament's second round. Shinnojou has a very calm and rational personality and rarely loses his composure. While he can make mistakes, he has a habit of blaming them on his fellow student, Zenmaru. Shinnojou once belonged to the Itten Ryū School, but lost his school and love, Sachi, at the hands of Nikaidou Misaku. He joined the Ogame School to hone his skills and seek vengeance for his fallen friends. Shinnojou favors the Ogame Ryū's Water Katas, which emphasize unorthodox sword swings to confuse and bypass an opponent's defense. Shinnojou is also a senior student who later become the leader of Ogame Ryu (after a duel fight with Sengoku Iori).
Zenmaru Ichinose (一ノ瀬善丸, Ichinose Zenmaru)
A student of the Ogame School who returns to Unabara in time to participate in the tournament's second round. Zenmaru is hotheaded and quick tempered and is easily provoked. He and Gama act like siblings, always arguing over who's stronger. Zenmaru is a member of the Ichinose Family, a clan from the land of Omika who are the swordmasters of that land's Daimyo. Zenmaru carries and wields the signature weapon of his clan, the 'Beast Sword' Kutaragi Sadanaga, an unnaturally large Ōdachi. Zenmaru favors the Ogame Ryū's Fire Katas, which focuses entirely on offense, and emphasizes strong attacks.
Iori Sengoku (千石伊織, Sengoku Iori)
The senior student and instructor of the Ogame School. He appears at the end of the first round. Iori taught Gama his sword techniques and is apparently a master of all the Style's katas. He possesses incredible skills but is known to sometimes go overboard when fighting opponents. Iori is one of the two student that Jinsuke teaches.

=== Antagonists ===
Jinsuke Kurogane
Jinsuke Kurogane is the father of Gama and the former teacher of Sengoku Iori and teacher of Ranmaru. He, along with three other members of the Ogame School, Kujou Mario, Ichinose Kai, and Murasame Riko, killed the other members of the Ogame school, excluding Turtle sensei, Zenmaru, Gama, Shin, and Iori. Later he created the Muhou school. Before the start of the series, he met Rintarou who had washed up onshore from Holland. Later he met a nine-year-old Iori and saved his life from bandits. He took him in and became a father figure to him and taught and trained him as a swordsman. He got into an argument on who should be the leader of the Ogame school with fellow student Tessai. Iori attempted to stop him before the massacre began but failed. As he left he told Gama to become a strong swordsman and in a few years they would meet again, and if he didn't join him then even if Gama was his own son, he would kill him. Jinsuke has a very calm yet confident personality. When discussing the Ogame school with the advisors of the Muhou school he confidently states that the Ogame school will arrive in Jouka and states they are strong because they seriously intend to defeat him. While everyone else was surprised at their strength, he was planning what to do to stop them from reaching Jouka. He also has a somewhat twisted personality, as he stated that the Muhou school will use all their power to crush the Ogame school, as that was his way of showing his love for them. And he enjoyed the idea of his son Gama and his student Ranmaru battling.
Hyouga Brothers
The brothers Masato (elder), and Kosaburou (younger). A pair of mercenaries hired by Naoyoshi to test the Ogama school's strength prior to the tournament. Masato is far stronger than Kosaburou and neither have a problem with using dirty methods. After Gama defeated them, they became students of Ogame School.

Tengen Ryū ("Heavenly Illusion Style") – A martial arts school that specializes in Naginatajutsu. A very young school which has only existed for three years. Grouped with the Ogame Style in the First Round.

Maki Baian (巻梅庵, Baian Maki)
Known as 'Drunk Baian', due to his great love of sake. The Head and founder of the Tengen Style, he desires to make his style the greatest in Unabara. Wields a large naginata called 'Bisentou'. Killed by Gama, who came to respect Baian and vowed to always remember his strength.
Yakushiji Eima (薬師寺栄馬, Eima Yakushiji)
An instructor of the Tengen Style who shares Baian's dream of making it the strongest. He once challenged Baian with a sword and lost, eventually becoming his follower. The only survivor of the Tengen style after they fight Gama.
Hiyoshi, Yukimura Masakiyo, Akaboshi Junnosuke – Students of the Tengen Style. All three were quickly killed by Gama when he attacked the doujo where they were staying.

Nakaizumi Ryū ("Middle Spring Style") – A martial arts school that specializes in Kyūjutsu. The school utilizes three unique kinds of arrows to overcome the limitations of archery in combat. "Destruction" uses a heavy lead mass on the head to give it great speed and accuracy. "Encircle" uses special fletchings to allow it to turn in flight. "Fang" uses a crescent bladed head and multiple barbs to cause extreme damage. Grouped with the Ogame Style in the First Round.

Nakaizumi Arata
Heir of the Nakaizumi style, it took him 14 years to completely master his style. Lures Gama into a forest so that Gama will believe he has the edge only to utilize his styles arrows to their full potential. However he loses in the end, with Gama letting him live because he found Arata's style impressive and wanted him to perfect it. In chapter 110, he leads the Nakaizumi Ryū School to aid Shin, Zenmaru and Iori push back the Muhou School.

Kyousen Ryū ("Thousand Mirror Style") – A shadowy martial arts school that specializes in Taijutsu. The Kyousen Style uses specific strikes to an opponent's body in order to rupture their internal organs. Only taught within the Daimaru Clan, the style has been used for assassinations for several generations. Grouped with the Ogame Style in the First Round.

Daimaru Sakon
The 6th and youngest son of the Daimaru Clan. The style's current master, Sakon is a prodigy, regarded as the strongest fighter in the history of the Kyousen Style. Despite his prodigious skills, Sakon has a weak and gentle mind. When he was a young child, he was manipulated by his oldest brother, Ryūgo, in order to turn him into the ultimate weapon. Mentally and emotionally broken, he becomes a savage, mindless killer whenever he sees his own blood. Killed by Gama, after a vicious battle, who regretted he couldn't fight the 'real' Sakon.
Daimaru Ryūgo
The eldest son of the Daimaru Clan. He desires to bring the Kyousen Style out of the shadows and to dominate all other schools. To fulfill this plan, Ryūgo has sought to 'perfect' Sakon's genius by subjecting him to mental and emotional trauma, thus creating the perfect warrior. Gama later pointed out that Ryūgo's actions actually ruined Sakon's true potential, by turning him into nothing more than a 'mindless beast'. Ironically, he is killed by Sakon, who shatters Ryūgo's spine while in his berserk state.
Daimaru Souji, Genzou, and Shinosuke
The 2nd, 3rd, and 4th sons (respectively) of the Daimaru Clan. Without permission from Ryūgo, they attempted a sneak attack on Gama while he was recovering from his injuries after consecutively battling the Tengen and Nakaizumi Styles. Arrogant and overconfident, they believed Gama would be an easy target, yet all three were killed by Gama with little difficulty.
Daimaru Gorou
The 5th son of the Daimaru Clan. While he supports his brothers, he is more level-headed and rational. The only brother who is sympathetic towards Sakon and realizes that Ryūgo's actions did not strengthen Sakon but broke him. The only brother to survive the battles with Gama.

Tamagakushi Ryū – A martial arts school that specializes in Ninjutsu. A style that has militarized the art of ninjutsu and is known as one of the "Five Dragon's of Unabara".

Fujibayashi Saizou
The head of the Tamagakushi style. Nickname the "Soul Binder", Saizou is able to paralyze his opponents by throwing small needles (senbon) into the joints in the bone. Killed by Gama with the recently perfected 3rd mode of his lightning kata.

Kasanemanji Ryū – A martial arts school that specializes in Kusarigamajutsu. Each member of the school wields a unique kusarigama. They gained renown in the tournament for defeating one of the "Five Dragon" styles in the First Round. Fought against the Ogame style in the Second Round.

Matsumoto Muraku
The leader of the Kasanemanji style. Attempted to kill Naoyoshi at the beginning of the Second Round, but left after seeing Gama's techniques, vowing to return and fight him one-on-one. While appearing calm, his actions and thoughts suggests he's a sadist. Muraku appears able to quickly analyze an opponent's techniques and devise a counter to them.
Jaki and Kotaru
Two students of the Kasanemanji style, they attacked Gama's group before the beginning of the Second Round. Attempted to ambush them again after the Second Round started, but were eliminated by Gama.

Myoujin Ryū – A martial arts school that specializes in Sōjutsu. A style that has existed for over a hundred years and is known as one of the "Five Dragon's of Unabara". The style passes down its techniques by continually handing down four unique Japanese spears to four wielders. These wielders are known as "The Four Divine Spears". While there are many 'disciples', only the four who wield one of these spears is considered a member of the Myoujin Style. Fought against the Ogame Style in the Second Round.

Midou Shingo
One of the "Four Divine Spears" and wielder of the spear, "Onidachi" (Demon Splitter), an unnaturally large Sankaku Yari. He inherited Onidachi after his master was killed by Kurogane Jinsuke. In order to wield the extremely long and heavy spear, Shingo spent years honing his muscles to perfection. Fought Gama and lost, but died standing and holding his spear.
Sakakibara Sasuke
One of the "Four Divine Spears" and wielder of the spear, "Beninuki" (Crimson Extractor), an unusual variation of a Kata Kama Yari. He inherited Beninuki by killing all other candidates, and revels in mutilating his opponents. Fought Zenmaru and lost, cut in half by Zenmaru's 'Sadanaga'.
Jinno Ichiou
One of the "Four Divine Spears" and wielder of the spear, "Ginkan" (Silver Gate Bar), a Kikuchi Yari. The oldest of the 'Spears', having held his title and weapon for 20 years. Attempted to fight Sengoku Iori, but Iori did not even bother to draw his sword, instead crippling Ichiou for life using just his bare hands.
Omiya Banri
One of the "Four Divine Spears" and wielder of the spear, "Kuyou", a Kuda Yari. He inherited his spear after his father, the previous wielder, was killed by Kurogane Jinsuke. He is later revealed to have aligned himself with Jinsuke's Muhou School, for the sole purpose of fighting the elite students of the Ogame School who had been trained by Jinsuke himself.

Muhou Ryū

Jinsuke's Personal Corps

Kudou Shimon
One of ten members of Jinsuke's personal guard – the strongest battle unit in Muhou School. He was investigating Gama at Grand Tournament of Unabara.
Ranmaru Itou
Member of Jinsuke's personal guard – the strongest battle unit in Muhou school. He got promoted from corps commander after the Grand Tournament of Unabara, at which he beat Gama and kidnapped Naoyoshi. He's Jinsuke's second student. Ranmaru is Gama's main rival. Having easily beaten him during the Unabara Grand Tournament, Ranmaru is shocked when Gama manages to break his sword into two during their next meeting.
Tsuchiryuu
A mysterious man who covers his face, Tsuchiryuu is shown to be very skilled when he catches a sword thrown at him by Kamedenbou Sensei with his bare hands. He also believes he is skilled at hiding his presence and commends Kamedenbou for discovering him. He also seems to emit a powerful battle aura.
Yamanoue Kiyomori, the "Lord Of Doom Fist"
The founder and former leader of the Genkon of Kenpon. Skilled at paralysing the nervous system, he is able to render opponents unable to use parts of their body with precise strikes. He is defeated by Kashitarou, who mimics his technique and numbs the nerves on his fist, thus preventing Kiyomori from killing him with a direct thrust to the heart. Kashitarou then proceeds to defeat him. Kiyomori seems rather carefree at first glance, supremely confident of his own abilities and often prone to mocking his opponents' lack of strength. However, he comes to respect Kashitarou towards the end of their fight, saying "If only you had been born without a physical defect" right before Kashitarou incapacitates him.
Toujou Shungaku
The oldest and most powerful of the Leaders.
Tsurumaru Shinsuke
Shinkuu
Arimaru

Advisors

Kujou Mario
He is the Head Advisor, formerly Ogame. Kujou left the Ogame School with Jinsuke six years ago. He appears to have respect for Shinnojou and even is able to recognize his handiwork when he and Jinsuke visit the Ogame school. He also warns Shinnojou that he will have to eventually kill him.
Ichinose Kai
He is a former member of the Ogame School and the older brother of Ichinose Zenmaru. He is the heir of the Ichinose clan which uses the Kutaragi Sadanaga (Literally: Beast Sword). He easily defeats Zenmaru during the Unabara Grand Tournament. He teases Zenmaru by calling him his precious little brother.
Murasame Riko
formerly Ogame School. Riko left with Jinsuke to the Muhou School and changened his hair style. He battles Gama and forfeits the battle after Gama breaks his technique of Absolute Defense, proving that he has evolved in skill since Riko left the Ogame School.
Hanamura Riichirou
formerly Shuujin School.
Kuryuu Ango
formerly Gaun School.
Nachi
formerly Unabara Secret Affairs President.
Tsukikage

Corps Commanders

Yoshifuku Jingyou
Commander of the 2nd Corps
Nishio Motoji
Commander of the 3rd Corps & Captain of the Anti-Ogame School Advance Strike Squad
Kuro Hajime
Commander of the 4th Corps
Hasukawa Kiichi
Commander of the 5th Corps
Nasu Souun
Commander of the 8th Corps
Toudou Koma
Commander of the 9th Corps
Oshimi Taisuke
Commander of the 10th Corps
Mamiya Suzunosuke
Commander of the 11th Corps
Kura Shiden
Commander of the 12th Corps
Furuhashi Genya
Commander of the 13th Corps
Rinkei
Commander of the 14th Corps (probably Maezono Rinkei)
Maezono Chouei
Commander of the 16th Corps
Niina Gakushin
Commander of the 17th Corps
Maruyama Ichida
Terujiru & Kouzou, Commanders of the 18th Corps & Captains of the Ayanaka Florest Path Watch
Uchikawa Banjirou
Commander of the 21st Corps
Azuma Jin
Commander of the 24th Corps
Kumakushi Sanzou
Commander of the 38th Corps

Division Commanders

Maniwa Juuhou
Commander of the 2nd Raid Division
Shibano Ippi
Commander of the 8th Guard Division
Sarumata Kenzou
Commander of the 27th Commando Division

=== Unabara Royal Family ===
The sons of lord Washitzu Naosata, each has sponsored a different school in the tournament. The winning school's sponsor will succeed Lord Washitzu.

Naomasa Washitzu
The lord of the Haunt of Demons, he is obsessed with determining which school of martial art is the best and as a result had the tournament created in order to determine the strongest school. He is familiar with Jinsuke Kurogane and was ecstatic to learn that his son would be participating in the tournament. He also cares little about the lives of his sons, as seen when he makes the requirement for passing the second round to be taking their heads.
Naosata Washitzu (鷲津直正, Washizu Naomasa)
The 10th son of lord Washitzu and sponsor of the Tengen school. Like most of Naoyoshi's brothers, he considers Naoyoshi worthless because his mother is a commoner, going so far as to call him a maggot.
Naokatsu Washitzu (鷲津直勝, Washizu Naokatsu)
The 31st son of lord Washitzu. He is the only one of Naoyoshi's brothers who does not despise him and feels that the status of his mother does not make Naoyoshi any different from the rest of them.

== Publication ==
Written and illustrated by Yousuke Nakamaru, Gamaran was serialized in Kodansha's shōnenmanga magazine Weekly Shonen Magazine from May 13, 2009, to June 26, 2013.

The manga is licensed digitally in English by Kodansha USA and the first volume was released on September 20, 2022.

A sequel manga series, titled Gamaran: Shura (我間乱 ―修羅―), which focuses on Iori Sengoku, was serialized in Kodansha's Magazine Pocket app from March 7, 2018, to February 27, 2025. The sequel manga is also licensed digitally in English by Kodansha USA and the first volume was released on October 25, 2022.

=== Volumes ===
No.	Original release date	Original ISBN	English release date	English ISBN
01	August 17, 2009	978-4-06-384179-4	September 20, 2022	978-1-68491-442-5
02	October 16, 2009	978-4-06-384199-2	October 18, 2022	978-1-68491-499-9
03	December 17, 2009	978-4-06-384227-2	November 15, 2022	978-1-68491-546-0
04	February 17, 2010	978-4-06-384255-5	December 20, 2022	978-1-68491-595-8
05	April 16, 2010	978-4-06-384285-2	January 17, 2023	978-1-68491-643-6
06	July 16, 2010	978-4-06-384335-4	February 21, 2023	978-1-68491-706-8
07	September 17, 2010	978-4-06-384367-5	March 21, 2023	978-1-68491-852-2
08	December 17, 2010	978-4-06-384421-4	April 18, 2023	978-1-68491-891-1
09	February 17, 2011	978-4-06-384449-8	May 16, 2023	978-1-68491-937-6
10	April 15, 2011	978-4-06-384477-1	June 20, 2023	978-1-68491-970-3
11	June 17, 2011	978-4-06-384507-5	July 18, 2023	979-8-88933-040-0
12	September 16, 2011	978-4-06-384552-5	August 15, 2023	979-8-88933-097-4
13	November 17, 2011	978-4-06-384581-5	September 19, 2023	979-8-88933-146-9
14	January 17, 2012	978-4-06-384614-0	October 17, 2023	979-8-88933-190-2
15	April 17, 2012	978-4-06-384657-7	November 21, 2023	979-8-88933-273-2
16	May 15, 2012	978-4-06-384690-4	December 19, 2023	979-8-88933-293-0
17	September 14, 2012	978-4-06-384737-6	January 16, 2024	979-8-88933-327-2
18	November 16, 2012	978-4-06-384768-0	February 20, 2024	979-8-88933-376-0
19	January 17, 2013	978-4-06-384798-7	March 19, 2024	979-8-88933-414-9
20	April 17, 2013	978-4-06-384847-2	April 16, 2024	979-8-88933-439-2
21	June 17, 2013	978-4-06-384879-3	May 21, 2024	979-8-88933-440-8
22	August 16, 2013	978-4-06-394913-1	June 18, 2024	979-8-88933-570-2

=== Gamaran: Shura ===
No.	Original release date	Original ISBN	English release date	English ISBN
1	May 9, 2018	978-4-06-511566-4	October 25, 2022	978-1-68491-443-2
2	July 9, 2018	978-4-06-511780-4	November 22, 2022	978-1-68491-500-2
3	November 9, 2018	978-4-06-513239-5	December 27, 2022	978-1-68491-547-7
4	January 9, 2019	978-4-06-514456-5	January 24, 2023	978-1-68491-596-5
5	March 8, 2019	978-4-06-514785-6	February 28, 2023	978-1-68491-646-7
6	May 9, 2019	978-4-06-515138-9	March 28, 2023	978-1-68491-853-9
7	July 9, 2019	978-4-06-515725-1	April 25, 2023	978-1-68491-898-0
8	September 9, 2019	978-4-06-517278-0	May 23, 2023	978-1-68491-943-7
9	December 9, 2019	978-4-06-517834-8	June 27, 2023	978-1-68491-976-5
10	February 7, 2020	978-4-06-518451-6	July 25, 2023	979-8-88933-046-2
11	May 8, 2020	978-4-06-519381-5	August 22, 2023	979-8-88933-098-1
12	July 9, 2020	978-4-06-520102-2	September 26, 2023	979-8-88933-154-4
13	October 9, 2020	978-4-06-521025-3	October 24, 2023	979-8-88933-194-0
14	January 8, 2021	978-4-06-521678-1	November 28, 2023	979-8-88933-277-0
15	March 9, 2021	978-4-06-522657-5	December 26, 2023	979-8-88933-297-8
16	June 9, 2021	978-4-06-523602-4	January 23, 2024	979-8-88933-332-6
17	September 9, 2021	978-4-06-524841-6	February 27, 2024	979-8-88933-381-4
18	December 9, 2021	978-4-06-526274-0	March 26, 2024	979-8-88933-420-0
19	March 9, 2022	978-4-06-527266-4	April 23, 2024	979-8-88933-444-6
20	May 9, 2022	978-4-06-527843-7	May 28, 2024	979-8-88933-445-3
21	July 8, 2022	978-4-06-528382-0	June 25, 2024	979-8-88933-577-1
22	September 9, 2022	978-4-06-529146-7	July 23, 2024	979-8-88933-629-7
23	November 9, 2022	978-4-06-529926-5	August 27, 2024	979-8-88933-699-0
24	February 9, 2023	978-4-06-530741-0	September 24, 2024	979-8-89478-018-4
25	April 7, 2023	978-4-06-531461-6	October 22, 2024	979-8-89478-106-8
26	June 8, 2023	978-4-06-531873-7	November 26, 2024	979-8-89478-168-6
27	August 8, 2023	978-4-06-532604-6	December 24, 2024	979-8-89478-305-5
28	October 6, 2023	978-4-06-533223-8	January 28, 2025	979-8-89478-318-5
29	December 7, 2023	978-4-06-534085-1	February 25, 2025	979-8-89478-373-4
30	March 8, 2024	978-4-06-534861-1	March 25, 2025	979-8-89478-435-9
31	June 7, 2024	978-4-06-535795-8	April 22, 2025	979-8-89478-512-7
32	August 7, 2024	978-4-06-536532-8	June 24, 2025	979-8-89478-513-4
33	November 8, 2024	978-4-06-537503-7	August 26, 2025	979-8-89478-514-1
34	February 7, 2025	978-4-06-538453-4	October 28, 2025	979-8-89478-732-9
35	April 9, 2025	978-4-06-539039-9	December 30, 2025	979-8-89478-810-4

== See also ==
- Tenkaichi: The Greatest Warrior Under the Rising Sun, another manga series written by Yousuke Nakamaru
