= Hōkago Himitsu Club =

Japanese manga series

- First tankōbon volume cover

放課後ひみつクラブ (Hōkago Himitsu Kurabu)
- Genre: Comedy
- Manga
- Written by: Teppei Fukushima
- Published by: Shueisha
- Imprint: Jump Comics+
- Magazine: Shōnen Jump+
- Original run: October 18, 2022 – December 10, 2024
- Volumes: 8
- icon

Hōkago Himitsu Club (放課後ひみつクラブ, Hōkago Himitsu Kurabu; lit. 'After School Secret Club') is a Japanese manga series written and illustrated by Teppei Fukushima. It was serialized on Shueisha's digital platform Shōnen Jump+ from October 2022 to December 2024, with its chapters collected in eight tankōbon volumes.

== Publication ==
Written and illustrated by Teppei Fukushima, Hōkago Himitsu Club was serialized on Shueisha's digital platform Shōnen Jump+ from October 18, 2022, to December 10, 2024. Shueisha collected its chapters in eight tankōbon volumes, released from January 4, 2023, to February 4, 2025.

=== Volumes ===
| No. | Japanese release date | Japanese ISBN |
|---|---|---|
| 1 | January 4, 2023 | 978-4-08-883374-3 |
| 2 | May 2, 2023 | 978-4-08-883522-8 |
| 3 | October 4, 2023 | 978-4-08-883685-0 |
| 4 | February 2, 2024 | 978-4-08-883872-4 |
| 5 | June 4, 2024 | 978-4-08-884128-1 |
| 6 | October 4, 2024 | 978-4-08-884277-6 |
| 7 | December 4, 2024 | 978-4-08-884357-5 |
| 8 | February 4, 2025 | 978-4-08-884375-9 |

== Reception ==
The series ranked seventh in the 2023 Next Manga Award in the web category. The manga ranked eleventh on Takarajimasha's Kono Manga ga Sugoi! list of best manga of 2024 for male readers.

== See also ==
- Bokura wa Mahō Shōnen, another manga series by the same creator
