= Versus (2022 manga) =

Japanese manga series

- First tankōbon volume cover, featuring Hallow (left), Panepane (center), Zaybi (right), and Jachi (top)

バーサス (Bāsasu)
- Genre: Adventure; Heroic fantasy; Isekai
- Manga
- Written by: One (story); bose (composition)
- Illustrated by: Kyōtarō Azuma
- Published by: Kodansha
- English publisher: NA: Kodansha USA
- Magazine: Monthly Shōnen Sirius
- Original run: November 26, 2022 – present
- Volumes: 7
- icon

Versus (Japanese: バーサス, Hepburn: Bāsasu) is a Japanese manga series written by One, illustrated by Kyōtarō Azuma, and composed by bose. It has been serialized in Kodansha's shōnen manga magazine Monthly Shōnen Sirius since November 2022.

The manga won the 49th Kodansha Manga Award in the shōnen category in 2025.

== Synopsis ==
In an unnamed medieval fantasy-styled world (referred to as "Sorcerion") humanity attempts to make a last ditch effort against their "Natural Enemies" (天敵, Tenteki), a race of oppressive demons. After failing to combat them directly, the sorcerers of the world resort to summoning humans from an alternate timeline, in the hopes that they will be able to save them. However, they soon discover that not only are these humans battling a similarly apocalyptic scenario, but that they and the humans of 11 other timelines all attempted to summon saviors as well, resulting in all the Natural Enemies, humans, and worlds of each timeline being brought to the same place. The collective survivors decide to survive through utilizing their varying experiences and technologies, with the main plan being to trick their enemies into fighting each other.

== Characters ==
=== Combined Forces of Humanity ===
==== Sorcerion ====
Hallow (ハロゥ, Harō)
A 16-year-old boy and the 11th hero of the 47 heroes of Sorcerion, who confronts the 11th Demon Lord, Jachi, but is quickly defeated. After recognizing humanity's inability to overcome its Natural Enemies, he recovers and allies with his brother Zaybi. They work with the Combined Forces of Humanity, manipulating Natural Enemies against one another while evacuating humans from endangered worlds to preserve their species.
Zaybi (ゼイビィ, Zeibī)
Zaybi is the captain of Sorcerion's 7th Northern Mage Squad and the older brother of Hallow. He orchestrates a plan to summon allied forces from other worlds using magic, inadvertently causing the fusion of thirteen dimensions. As co-representative of Sorcerion alongside Hallow in the Combined Forces of Humanity, he serves as their chief strategist, specializing in turning Natural Enemies against one another.
Panepane (パネパネ)
Hallow's support fairy companion.
Ario (アリオ)
The 19th Hero of the 47 Heroes of Sorcerion, a childhood friend of Hallow, was tasked with battling the 19th Demon Lord Nyudo. Overwhelmed by Nyudo's power, he fled in fear and carried lasting guilt for his retreat. Seeking redemption, he later joins the alliance against the Natural Enemies. He is currently imprisoned by the Neo-Humans after luring several Titans into their city.

==== The Mecha Ordinance ====
Keila (ケイラ, Keira)
The commander of the 31st Anti-Machine Combat Forces Platoon, a disciplined and formidable leader, becomes the first ally of the Hallow brothers in the newly fused world. She serves as co-representative of The Mecha Ordinance alongside Glasp within the alliance. Frequently participating in strike team operations, she aids in scouting other worlds and assessing Natural Enemies.
Glasp (ガラスプ, Garasupu)
The Major General of the Anti-Machine Combat Forces, a high-ranking officer from the Mecha Ordinance, assumes command of the Combined Forces of Humanity due to his extensive military leadership experience.

==== The Titans' Crown ====
Pakkya (パッキァ, Pakkia)
A representative of Titan's Crown. He ranks among his clan's most powerful warriors. He frequently accompanies strike teams to scout hostile worlds and assess threats.
Samone (サモウーン, Samoūn)
A representative of Titan's Crown. She voices the clan's moderate faction and frequently moderates Pakkya's impulsive behavior.

==== Neo Terra ====
Heidi (ハイジ, Haiji)
The Neo Terra representative who appears as an injured nun and was rescued by the survivors of Neo Terra. While recovering among them, she secretly gathers intelligence with plans to betray the alliance.

==== Celestia ====
Thear (スーア, Sūa)
The captain of Earth's Defense Force who serves as Celestia's representative, believing his world to be the most technologically advanced among the eleven.
Muun (ムン, Mun)
A fellow officer from Earth's Defense Force. She serves alongside Thear as Celestia's co-representative.

==== Land of the Lawless ====
Iglay (イギレイ, Igirei)
A representative from the Land of the Lawless maintains a low profile, reflecting her world's anarchic nature. Despite her detachment, she retains some faith in humanity's potential within the alliance. She is always accompanied by her dog, Sam.
Old Man Gio (ギオジィ, Giojī)
An elderly representative from the Land of the Law.

==== The Disastrous Metropolis ====
Masayoshi (マサヨシ)
The Disastrous Metropolis' lead representative possesses extensive knowledge of kaiju society. Despite being a civilian, he frequently devises practical and sometimes innovative strategies.
Takuya (タクヤ)
The Disastrous Metropolis representative, formerly an elementary school teacher, remains driven by a protective instinct toward others.
Mika (ミカ)
Masayoshi's younger sister actively motivates her brother to overcome his habitual idleness.

==== Parasitica ====
Cartel (カーテル, Kāteru)
A representative of Parasitica.
Peyo (ペーオ, Pēo)
A representative of Parasitica.

==== Gaia's Wrath ====
Wané (ウネ, Une)
The young representative of Gaia's Wraith serves as the alliance's occasional cook, channeling her passion for food into practical use.
Taihi (タイヒ)
The elderly representative of Gaia's Wraith.
Nukizumi (ヌキズミ)
A girl from Gaia's Wraith's lush forests joins Hallow's group during their travels, eager to explore the world beyond his homeland as they journey toward the alliance.

==== Indiginia ====
Naurai (ナウライ)
The fearful representative of Indiginia constantly warns others about 'God' as an omnipotent terror, strictly prohibiting any worship toward it.
Plana (プラナ, Purana)
The co-representative of Indiginia alongside Naurai.

==== Yggdrasion ====
Sabiwa (サビワ)
The representative of Yggdrasion.

==== The Cursed Lands ====
Bastz (バスツ, Basutsu)
The pessimistic representative of the cursed lands.

=== Natural Enemies ===
==== Demons ====
===== The 47 Demon Lords =====
Jachi (ジャチ)
The gigantic fishmen-like 11th Demon Lord stands as one of the 47 Demon Lords and Hallow's most formidable opponent. A warrior of immense offensive power, he grows concerned when the merging of worlds disrupts the natural hierarchy, potentially displacing demons from their dominant position. He personally investigates the new reality to study rival Natural Enemies and altered world dynamics. Though he initially dismissed Hallow after their first battle, he later recognizes him as a genuine threat upon learning of his continued survival and battles across the merged worlds, ultimately resolving to eliminate him permanently.
Nyudo (ニュドー, Nyudō)
A giant blobfish-like demon that is ranked as the 19th Demon Lord possesses unparalleled magical power among the 47 Demon Lords, his immense mana capacity fueled by his gluttonous nature.
Diganazal (ディーガナザル, Dīganazaru)
A charismatic capuchin monkey-like princess that is ranked as the 23rd Demon Lord conducts cruel experiments on living creatures to forge a supreme demon army. Nyudo, disapproving of her methods, orchestrates her demise through Ginbak and a titan assault.

===== Other Demons =====
Kiva (キヴァ)
A vampire-like high-ranking officer of the 11th Division demon army, he serves under Jachi. After failing to eliminate the Hallow brothers in their initial confrontation, he is dispatched to complete the mission.

==== Titans ====
Ginbak (ギンバッ, Ginbakku)
The Titan Chief who possesses unmatched physical power among his kind, combining devastating strength with extraordinary resilience.

==== Neo Humans ====
Rogen (ロージェン, Rojen)
The Neo Humans' Ninth City administrator and Heidi's older sibling.

==== The Lawless ====
===== Kyokai =====
Rinri (リンリ)
The merciless leader of the outlaw faction Kyokai operates with cold intellect, having abandoned all humanity to view living creatures as expendable instruments.
Gore (ゴア)
The leader of Kyokai's assault force serves as Rinri's primary lieutenant.

==== Kaiju ====
Daikokuzan (ダイコクザン)
A reptilian kaiju from the Disastrous Metropolis rivals mountainous proportions in sheer scale.

==== Other Natural Enemies ====
Yaotsu (ヤオツサマ, Yaotsu-sama) / God (神, Kami)
A powerful entity from Indiginia, born from collective worship, possesses godlike abilities yet exhibits childish behavior reflective of its divine self-perception.
Robots
The natural enemy of the Mecha Ordinance.
Mandalans
A species of cat-like aliens from the planet Celestia and Natural Enemies.

== Publication ==
Written by One, illustrated by Kyōtarō Azuma, and composed by bose, Versus started in Kodansha's shōnen manga magazine Monthly Shōnen Sirius on November 26, 2022. Kodansha has collected its chapters into individual tankōbon volumes. The first volume was released on April 7, 2023. As of June 9, 2026, seven volumes have been released.

Kodansha started publishing the series digitally in English on its K Manga service in November 2023; in the same month, Kodansha USA announced that it had licensed the manga for print release in North America starting in 2024.

=== Volumes ===
No.	Original release date	Original ISBN	English release date	English ISBN
1	April 7, 2023	978-4-06-530578-2	October 15, 2024	979-8-88877-137-2
1. "Last Hope" (最後の望み, Saigo no Nozomi); 2. "Humanity Caught In-Between" (挟まれる人類, Hasamareru Jinrui); 3. "Fused Worlds" (融合した世界, Yūgō Shita Sekai); 4. "A Ray of Light" (一筋の光明, Hitosuji no Kōmyō)
2	November 9, 2023	978-4-06-533522-2	January 14, 2025	979-8-88877-265-2
5. "Humanity's Allied Forces" (全人類連合軍(前編), Zen Jinrui Rengō-gun); 6. "Hero Ario" (勇者アリオ, Yūsha Ario); 7. "Before Plan Hallow is Executed" (ハロゥ作戦決行前, Harō Sakusen Kekkō Mae); 8. "Confronting the Titans" (巨人族との対峙, Kyojin-zoku to no Taiji); 9. "Titans vs. The Neo-Humans" (巨人族VS.新人類, Kyojinzoku VS. Shinjinrui)
3	May 9, 2024	978-4-06-535448-3	May 13, 2025	979-8-88877-411-3
10. "Defending the Humans' Base" (人類拠点防衛戦, Jinrui Kyoten Bōeisen); 11. "Invaders from Space" (宇宙からの侵略者, Uchū kara no Shinryakusha); 12. "Demons vs Aliens" (魔族VS.宇宙人, Mazoku VS Uchūjin); 13. "The Massive Existence" (大存在, Dai Zonsai); 14. "Inherited Life" (繋ぐべき命, Tsunagubeki Inochi)
4	November 8, 2024	978-4-06-537395-8	October 7, 2025	979-8-88877-555-4
15. "Human Imitation" (ニンゲンの真似事, Ningen no Manegoto); 16. "Parasitic Threat" (パラサイトの脅威, Parasaito no Kyōi); 17. "Birds of Different Feathers" (烏合の衆, Ugō no Shū); 18. "The Boy from the Verdant Forest" (緑の森の少年, Midori no Mori no Shōnen); 19. "Demon King Vs. ..." (魔王 VS. ..., Maō VS. ...)
5	May 9, 2025	978-4-06-539375-8	March 24, 2026	979-8-88877-738-1
20. "Power!!!!!!!" (パワー!!!!!!, Pawā! ! ! ! ! !); 21. "The Chief of Titans, Ginbak vs. The 23rd Demon Lord, Diganazal" (大首長ギンバックVS.第23魔王ディーガナザル, Dai Shuchō Ginbakku VS. Dai 23 Maō Dīganazaru); 22. "People" (人間たち, Ningen-tachi); 23. "Rinri of the Lawless" (無法者のリンリ, Muhōmono no Rinri); 24. "Grasping at Straws" (藁にも縋る, Wara ni mo Sugaru)
6	December 9, 2025	978-4-06-541780-5	January 26, 2027	979-8-88-877988-0
25. "Transcend" (超越, Chōetsu); 26. "Disaster" (惨事, Sanji); 27. "A Happy Place" (幸せの在り処, Shiawase no Arika); 28. "Factory" (工場, Kōjō); 29. "The Demon Lords vs Robots" (魔王VS.ロボット, Maō VS. Robotto)
7	June 9, 2026	978-4-06-543759-9	—	—
30. "A Hero's Intention" (勇者の意思, Yūsha no Ishi); 31. "Discussion with the Speck" (小粒との対話, Kotsubuto no Taiwa); 32. "Spiral Mountain and..." (蜷局山と…, Toguroyama to…); 33. "A Real Hero" (本物の勇者, Honmono no Yūsha)

=== Chapters not yet in tankōbon format ===
These chapters have not yet been published in a tankōbon volume.

34. "Let Them Have It" (思い知れ, Omoishire)
35. ”Ginbak Vs The Demon’s Corps” (ギンバックvs 大魔班, Daimahan)
36. ”Massive Shadow” (巨影, Kyoei)

== Reception ==
The manga was nominated for the 2023 Next Manga Award in the print category; it ranked 15th in the 2024 edition in the same category. The manga won the 49th Kodansha Manga Award in the shōnen category in 2025.

== See also ==
- Tenkaichi: The Greatest Warrior Under the Rising Sun, another manga series illustrated by Kyōtarō Azuma
