= Katabami to Ōgon =

Japanese manga series

- Cover of the first volume

片喰と黄金
- Genre: Adventure; Western
- Manga
- Written by: Eiichi Kitano
- Published by: Shueisha (former); Kodansha (current)
- Magazine: Ultra Jump (2019–2021); Comic Days (2021–2023)
- Original run: March 19, 2019 – May 30, 2023
- Volumes: 10
- icon

Katabami to Ōgon (Japanese: 片喰と黄金; lit. 'Yellow Sorrel and Gold') is a Japanese manga series written and illustrated by Eiichi Kitano. It was serialized in Shueisha's seinen manga magazine Ultra Jump from March 2019 to August 2021 and on Kodansha's manga website Comic Days from October 2021 to May 2023. The manga follows Amelia and Connor, who flee Ireland amidst the Irish potato famine, to try to find riches in the California gold rush. The manga received praise for its story, emphasis on historical accuracy, characters, and artwork.

== Plot ==
In January 1849, amidst the Irish potato famine, Amelia and her attendant Connor learned of the discovery of gold at Sutter's Mill and the ensuing California gold rush. Together, they decide to make the journey to California in search of riches. Eventually, they arrive in New York and, despite some conflicts, begin their journey west across the continent.

== Publication ==
Written and illustrated by Eiichi Kitano, the series began serialization in Shueisha's seinen manga magazine Ultra Jump on March 19, 2019. In October 2021, the serialized was transferred to Kodansha's manga website Comic Days. Kodansha also took over publishing the volumes. Its serialization ended on May 30, 2023. Its individual chapters were collected into ten tankōbon volumes.

== Reception ==
The manga has been recommended by manga artists Satoru Noda and Makoto Yukimura.

Nobunaga Minami of The Asahi Shimbun praised the story and dialog, describing it as fast-paced and well-researched. Minami also felt that Amelia was a compelling character. A columnist for Manga News felt that the first volume was well paced and had an immersive setting; they also liked the historical framework. The columnist felt that the artwork was detailed and flowed well with the narrative. A columnist for Manga Sanctuary liked the story, particularly the emphasis on historical accuracy, and the atmosphere. They also offered praise to the illustrations, comparing them to those by Taro Nogizaka. However, they felt the humor failed to land. BoDoï felt that the few moments of joy experienced between the characters struggles, including hunger, despair, and racism, stood out and were emotional. They also felt the artwork was detailed.
