= Dasei 67 Percent =

Japanese manga series

- First tankōbon volume cover

惰性67パーセント (Dasei 67 Pāsento)
- Genre: Erotic comedy; Slice of life
- Manga
- Written by: Shimimaru
- Published by: Shueisha
- Magazine: Ultra Jump
- Original run: July 19, 2014 – June 17, 2022
- Volumes: 9
- icon

Dasei 67 Percent (Japanese: 惰性67パーセント, Hepburn: Dasei 67 Pāsento; "Inertia 67%") is a Japanese manga series written and illustrated by Shimimaru. It was serialized in Shueisha's seinen manga magazine Ultra Jump from July 2014 to June 2022, with its chapters collected in nine tankōbon volumes.

== Synopsis ==
Minami Yoshizawa is a female college student who attends an art university. Her room is always filled with friends.

== Characters ==
Minami Yoshizawa (吉澤 みなみ, Yoshizawa Minami)
She belongs to the manga department of an art university as well as the Manga Study Group. After a year of unemployment, she entered university. She has a younger brother. Enjoys drawing manga and illustrations.
Moe Kitahara (北原 萌, Kitahara Moe)
Belongs to the design department. She has an older sister and brother.
Nishida (西田, Nishida)
Belongs to the animation department.
Itou (伊東, Itō)
Attends an art university. He is skillful with his hands and is good at sculpting and cooking. Dating Kaminuma.
Tomoko Kaminuma (上沼 智子, Kaminuma Tomoko)
Junior in the painting department. Attended the same cram school as Yoshizawa. She likes the occult and gets angry when people talk about it half-heartedly.
Junko Itsuki (五木 順子, Itsuki Junko)
Junior in the painting department. Has a good knowledge of biology. She has a brother.
Tachikawa (立川, Tachikawa)
Nishida's junior who belongs to the animation department.

== Publication ==
Written and illustrated by Shimimaru, Dasei 67 Percent was serialized in Shueisha's seinen manga magazine Ultra Jump from July 19, 2014, to June 17, 2022. Shueisha collected its chapters in nine tankōbon volumes, released from August 19, 2015. to August 19, 2022.

=== Volumes ===
No.	Japanese release date	Japanese ISBN
1	August 19, 2015	978-4-08-890233-3
2	June 17, 2016	978-4-08-890413-9
3	May 19, 2017	978-4-08-890648-5
4	April 19, 2018	978-4-08-891002-4
5	February 19, 2019	978-4-08-891220-2
6	January 17, 2020	978-4-08-891474-9
7	November 19, 2020	978-4-08-891707-8
8	October 19, 2021	978-4-08-892112-9
9	August 19, 2022	978-4-08-892408-3

== Reception ==
The series ranked second in the October 2015 edition of Takarajimasha's Kono Manga ga Sugoi! Web.
