= Bokura wa Mahō Shōnen =

Japanese manga series

- First tankōbon volume cover

ボクらは魔法少年
- Genre: Magical girl
- Manga
- Written by: Teppei Fukushima
- Published by: Shueisha
- Imprint: Young Jump Comics
- Magazine: Weekly Young Jump; (March 1, 2018 – March 7, 2019); Tonari no Young Jump; (March 8, 2018 – August 19, 2021); Ultra Jump; (September 19, 2019 – August 19, 2021)
- Original run: March 1, 2018 – August 19, 2021
- Volumes: 7

Bokura wa Mahō Shōnen (ボクらは魔法少年) is a Japanese manga series written and illustrated by Teppei Fukushima. It was initially serialized in Shueisha's Weekly Young Jump magazine as a monthly serialization in March 2018. It was later transferred to the Ultra Jump magazine where it continued from September 2019 to August 2021.

== Plot ==
The series is centered around elementary school boys who can transform into magical girls. Kaito Odagiri is a fifth grader who is a skilled fighter. Kaito gets scouted by Makoto Kaibara, a boy in his school, to protect the peace of the town. To Kaito's dismay, he finds out that what he's been recruited into involves him putting on a dress. Initially unwilling, he gets over his reluctance to wear dresses to become a magical girl.

== Publication ==
Written and illustrated by Teppei Fukushima, Bokura wa Mahō Shōnen was initially serialized in Shueisha's Weekly Young Jump magazine as a monthly serialization on March 1, 2018. It also began serialization on the Tonari no Young Jump manga service the following week. It was later transferred to the Ultra Jump magazine where it continued from September 19, 2019, to August 19, 2021. The series' chapters were compiled into seven tankōbon volumes as from September 19, 2018, to October 19, 2021.

No.	Release date	ISBN
1	September 19, 2018	978-4-08-891110-6
2	March 19, 2019	978-4-08-891224-0
3	September 19, 2019	978-4-08-891370-4
4	March 19, 2020	978-4-08-891563-0
5	October 16, 2020	978-4-08-891695-8
6	April 19, 2021	978-4-08-891883-9
7	October 19, 2021	978-4-08-892119-8

== Reception ==
The series was ranked eighteenth in the print category at the 5th Next Manga Awards in 2019.

== See also ==
- Hōkago Himitsu Club, another manga series by the same creator
