= Combustible Campus Guardress =

Japanese original video animation (OVA)

爆炎CAMPUSガードレス (Bakuen Kyanpasu Gādoresu)
- Original video animation
- Directed by: Toshihiko Nishikubo
- Produced by: Mitsuhisa Ishikawa; Tetsuo Daitoku
- Written by: Satoru Akahori
- Studio: Production I.G
- Released: May 27, 1994 – November 25, 1994
- Runtime: c. 30 minutes
- Episodes: 4
- icon

Combustible Campus Guardress (爆炎CAMPUSガードレス, Bakuen Kyanpasu Gādoresu) is an anime original video animation. The project was created by Satoru Akahori, features the original character designs of Kazushi Hagiwara and Kazuchika Kise. The English name "Combustible Campus Guardress" was originally coined by members of the Project Daicon subtitling group when they did the fansub for No-Name Anime.

The plot involves students from Tobira High School, who are guardians who must prevent the evil "Remnants" from reopening the gate that will let demons take over the world. Predominantly a parody of other "save the world" anime, there are fight scenes throughout the story. It is not suitable for children.

== Characters ==
Jinno Takumi (神野巧)
Voiced by: Akira Ishida
He is the key to the "gate" which will allow evil to spread throughout the world.
Jinno Hazumi (神野八純)
Voiced by: Rica Matsumoto
A guardian who protects Takumi and treats him as her real younger brother.
Chiryuu (地龍)
Voiced by: Kōichi Yamadera
Kijima Touta (鬼島藤太)
Voiced by: Akio Otsuka
McCoy (マッコイ)
Voiced by: Fumihiko Tachiki
Yamashiro Kazuma (山城数馬)
Voiced by: Toshiyuki Morikawa

== Music ==
1. "Innocent Heart" by Kei-Tee
2. "Love Diary"
