= Kazushi Hagiwara =

Japanese manga artist (born 1963)

Kazushi Hagiwara 萩原一至
- Born: April 4, 1963 (age 63) Nakano, Tokyo, Japan
- Area: Manga artist
- Notable works: Bastard!!

Kazushi Hagiwara (萩原一至, Hagiwara Kazushi; born April 4, 1963) is a Japanese manga artist best known for creating the manga Bastard!!.

== Biography ==
He originally began as an assistant to hentai manga artist Dirty Matsumoto, and then as an assistant to manga artist Izumi Matsumoto in the production of Kimagure Orange Road, creating his own stories in his spare time. He debuted in Weekly Shonen Jump with two short stories, Binetsu Rouge (in 1987) and Virgin Tyrant (in 1988). He has also supervised, co-written and illustrated three Bastard!! related novels for the Jump! J Books imprint.

His group of assistants are called Studio Loud In School. They regularly publish a best-selling dōjinshi, Wonderful Megadeth, as well as various dōjinshi featuring popular fighting games such as Dead or Alive, Virtua Fighter and various Capcom games. In 2012, he designed the armor for two jobs (Geomancer and Rune Fencer) in the 2013 Final Fantasy XI expansion, Seekers of Adoulin.

Hagiwara is a high school drop-out, however he is a graduate from Tokyo Designer Gakuin College.

== Works ==
Title	Year	Notes	Refs
Bastard!! Heavy Metal, Dark Fantasy	1988–present	Serialized in Weekly Shonen Jump, later irregularly in Ultra Jump; Published by Shueisha in 27 volumes	
Combustible Campus Guardress	1994	Character designer, original video animation	
Final Fantasy XI - Seekers of Adoulin	2013	Character designer, video game expansion pack	
Endride	2016	Character designer, TV anime	
