= Tadano Kōgyō Kōkō no Nichijō =

Japanese manga series

- First tankōbon volume cover

只野工業高校の日常
- Genre: Comedy
- Manga
- Written by: Chisato Oga
- Published by: Shueisha
- Imprint: Young Jump Comics
- Magazine: Ultra Jump
- Original run: July 19, 2019 – present
- Volumes: 15

Tadano Kōgyō Kōkō no Nichijō (只野工業高校の日常; lit. 'Daily Lives of Tadano Technical High School') is a Japanese manga series written and illustrated by Chisato Oga. It was originally published as a webcomic on the author's Twitter account in September 2017. A one-shot was later published in Shueisha's seinen manga magazine Ultra Jump in December 2018. It later began serialization in the same magazine in July 2019.

== Synopsis ==
The series is set in a high school in the snowy countryside whose student body is predominantly male. The male students, despite having a delinquent-like appearance, take their studies very seriously to comic effect.

== Publication ==
Written and illustrated by Chisato Oga, Tadano Kōgyō Kōkō no Nichijō was originally published as a webcomic on Oga's Twitter account on September 24, 2017. A one-shot was published in Shueisha's seinen manga magazine Ultra Jump on December 19, 2018. It later began serialization in the same magazine on July 19, 2019. The series' chapters have been compiled into fifteen tankōbon volumes as of August 2026.

No.	Release date	ISBN
1	January 17, 2020	978-4-08-891475-6
2	August 19, 2020	978-4-08-891628-6
3	November 19, 2020	978-4-08-891749-8
4	June 18, 2021	978-4-08-891874-7
5	October 19, 2021	978-4-08-892128-0
6	April 19, 2022	978-4-08-892254-6
7	September 16, 2022	978-4-08-892444-1
8	April 18, 2023	978-4-08-892669-8
9	October 19, 2023	978-4-08-892831-9
10	February 19, 2024	978-4-08-893129-6
11	July 18, 2024	978-4-08-893310-8
12	February 18, 2025	978-4-08-893562-1
13	August 19, 2025	978-4-08-893759-5
14	February 19, 2026	978-4-08-894109-7
15	August 19, 2026	978-4-08-894326-8

== Reception ==
The series was nominated for the sixth Next Manga Awards in 2020 in the print category, and was ranked tenth out of 50 nominees. The series won the grand prize at NTT Solmare's "Minna ga Erabu!! Denshi Comic Taishō 2022" competition in 2022.
