= Baby Road Trippers =

Japanese manga series

- First tankōbon volume cover

ベイビー車中ハッカーズ (Bebī Shachū Hakkāzu)
- Genre: Coming-of-age
- Manga
- Written by: Tabireco
- Published by: Shueisha
- Imprint: Young Jump Comics
- Magazine: Ultra Jump
- Original run: August 19, 2024 – present
- Volumes: 4

Baby Road Trippers (Japanese: ベイビー車中ハッカーズ, Hepburn: Bebī Shachū Hakkāzu) is a Japanese manga series written and illustrated by Tabireco. It began serialization in Shueisha's seinen manga magazine Ultra Jump in August 2024.

== Synopsis ==
Fuji Yonagi had always been fond of car camping as it was an activity she took part in with her father. After her father's death, Fuji, now a reclusive high school student, still participates in car camping, albeit on her own and without a driver's license that would enable her to do it. One day, her classmate Asahi Ichinose has an encounter with her, and later decides to indulge in car camping with her. Asahi also reveals to Fuji that she has a driver's license, thus enabling the two to go car camping.

== Publication ==
Written and illustrated by Tabireco, Baby Road Trippers began serialization in Shueisha's seinen manga magazine Ultra Jump on August 19, 2024. Its chapters have been compiled into four tankōbon volumes as of August 2026.

The series' chapters are published in English on Shueisha's Manga Plus app.

No.	Release date	ISBN
1	February 18, 2025	978-4-08-893559-1
2	September 19, 2025	978-4-08-893756-4
3	March 18, 2026	978-4-08-894141-7
4	August 19, 2026	978-4-08-894325-1

== Reception ==
The series was nominated in the print category at the eleventh and twelfth Next Manga Awards in 2025 and 2026, respectively.
