= Konzukushi =

Japanese manga series

- First tankōbon volume cover

こんづくし
- Genre: Comedy
- Manga
- Written by: Ayami Morinaga
- Published by: Shueisha
- Imprint: Young Jump Comics
- Magazine: Ultra Jump
- Original run: April 18, 2025 – present
- Volumes: 3

Konzukushi (こんづくし) is a Japanese manga series written and illustrated by Ayami Morinaga. It began serialization in Shueisha's seinen manga magazine Ultra Jump in April 2025.

== Synopsis ==
Ibara Sakamogi missed her high school entrance exam due to having food poisoning on the day of the exam. As a result of that incident, she is unable to find a place, and joins a fox girl school that is strictly off-limits human, hiding her identity as a human. The school principal sees through her identity and tries to expel her, but due to Ibara's pleas, he changes his mind and allows her to stay. However the principal warns her that if her true identity is discovered, she will be expelled immediately.

== Characters ==
Ibara Sakamogi (逆茂木 いばら, Sakamogi Ibara)
Voiced by: Ikumi Hasegawa (vomic)

== Media ==
=== Manga ===
Written and illustrated by Ayami Morinaga, Konzukushi began serialization in Shueisha's seinen manga magazine Ultra Jump on April 18, 2025. Its chapters have been compiled into three tankōbon volumes as of June 2026.

No.	Release date	ISBN
1	November 19, 2025	978-4-08-894016-8
2	January 19, 2026	978-4-08-894066-3
3	June 18, 2026	978-4-08-894262-9

=== Other ===
In commemoration of the release of the first volume, a voice comic adaptation was uploaded to the Young Jump Manga TV YouTube channel on November 19, 2025. The voice comic featured voice acting from Ikumi Hasegawa.

== Reception ==
The series was ranked first in the Creature category at Niconico's 3rd Manga General Election in 2026. The series was ranked fifteenth in the print category at the twelfth Next Manga Awards.
