= Kimagure Orange Road =

Japanese manga and anime series

- First tankōbon volume cover, featuring Madoka Ayukawa

きまぐれオレンジ☆ロード (Kimagure Orenji Rōdo)
- Genre: Romantic comedy; Supernatural
- Manga
- Written by: Izumi Matsumoto
- Published by: Shueisha
- English publisher: NA: Digital Manga Guild
- Imprint: Jump Comics
- Magazine: Weekly Shōnen Jump
- Original run: March 26, 1984 – September 28, 1987
- Volumes: 18
- Anime film

Shonen Jump Special: Kimagure Orange Road
- Directed by: Tomomi Mochizuki; Osamu Kobayashi (supervision)
- Produced by: Minoru Ōno; Masaaki Fushikawa
- Written by: Kazunori Itō
- Music by: Ryō Yonemitsu
- Studio: Studio Pierrot
- Released: November 23, 1985
- Runtime: 25 minutes
- Anime television series
- Directed by: Osamu Kobayashi
- Produced by: Hideo Kawano; Reiko Fukakusa; Tooru Horikoshi
- Written by: Kenji Terada
- Music by: Shirō Sagisu
- Studio: Studio Pierrot
- Licensed by: NA: Discotek Media
- Original network: NNS (NTV)
- Original run: April 6, 1987 – March 7, 1988
- Episodes: 48
- Anime film

I Want to Return to That Day
- Directed by: Tomomi Mochizuki
- Produced by: Hideo Kawano; Reiko Fukakusa
- Written by: Kenji Terada
- Music by: Shirō Sagisu
- Studio: Studio Pierrot
- Licensed by: NA: Discotek Media
- Released: October 1, 1988
- Runtime: 69 minutes
- Original video animation
- Directed by: Kōichirō Nakamura (#1, 3–6); Shigeru Morikawa (#2); Takeshi Mori (#3–8); Naoyuki Yoshinaga (#7–8)
- Produced by: Haruo Sai; Reiko Fukakusa; Hideo Kawano (#1–2); Yasushi Shibahara (#1–2)
- Written by: Kenji Terada (#1–2, 4–6); Isao Shizuya (#3, 7); Masamichi Fujiwara (#8)
- Music by: Shirō Sagisu
- Studio: Studio Pierrot
- Licensed by: NA: Discotek Media
- Released: February 15, 1989 – January 18, 1991
- Runtime: 25 minutes per episode
- Episodes: 8
- Anime film

Shin Kimagure Orange Road: Summer's Beginning
- Directed by: Kunihiko Yuyama (director); Tatsuya Ishihara (unit director)
- Produced by: Kiichirō Yamazaki; Masako Fukuyo; Mitsuru Ōshima; Reiko Fukakusa
- Written by: Kenji Terada
- Music by: Yuki Kajiura
- Studio: Studio Pierrot
- Licensed by: NA: ADV Films
- Released: November 2, 1996
- Runtime: 95 minutes
- icon

Kimagure Orange Road (Japanese: きまぐれオレンジ☆ロード, Hepburn: Kimagure Orenji Rōdo; Capricious Orange Road) is a Japanese manga series written and illustrated by Izumi Matsumoto. It was serialized in Weekly Shōnen Jump magazine from 1984 to 1987, with the chapters collected in 18 tankōbon volumes by Shueisha. The story follows teenage esper Kyōsuke Kasuga and the love triangle he gets involved in with Madoka Ayukawa, a young heroine with a reputation for being an unpopular loner and delinquent, and her best friend Hikaru Hiyama.

Following a 1985 film pilot (Shonen Jump Special), Toho and Studio Pierrot created an anime television series that was broadcast on Nippon Television from 1987 to 1988. Two more films were released in 1988 and 1996, as well as an original video animation series that began in 1989. In the mid-1990s the series was novelized as well. The manga has been released in English digitally by Digital Manga Guild. The anime television series, second film, and original video animation series were all released in North America by AnimEigo, while the third film was licensed by ADV Films. The anime series is currently licensed by Discotek Media.

The Kimagure Orange Road manga has over 20 million copies in circulation, making it one of the best-selling manga series of all time. It is credited alongside Dragon Ball for introducing an entire generation of Europeans to anime and manga. It was also an archetypal shōnen romantic comedy, a genre which it had a major influence on, and the character Madoka is considered to be a root of the tsundere archetype. The anime's Christmas episode also featured an early use of the time loop plot device.

== Plot ==
Kyōsuke Kasuga and his family had to move several times after being seen using their esper powers. Upon settling for the seventh time, Kyōsuke briefly meets a pretty girl who gives him her straw hat, and he falls in love with her on sight. On the first day of school he learns this girl is his junior high classmate Madoka Ayukawa, who, contrary to his initial impression, is feared as a tough and no-nonsense delinquent. Their underclassman (and Madoka's best friend), Hikaru Hiyama, sees Kyōsuke use his powers to sink an impressive basketball shot and falls in love with him. Kyōsuke ends up dating Hikaru while constantly struggling with his feelings for Madoka due to his indecisiveness. Likewise, Madoka has feelings for Kyōsuke which she masks with her capricious nature for fear of hurting her friend Hikaru.

== Characters ==
Kyōsuke Kasuga (春日 恭介, Kasuga Kyōsuke; voice: Tōru Furuya (Japanese), Yuu Mizushima (1985 Shonen Jump Special) )
Kyōsuke is the male protagonist in the love triangle. He and his siblings have supernatural powers and are described as espers in the series. They are forbidden from using their powers in public, lest they be discovered and exploited. Kyōsuke's esper powers include teleportation, telekinesis, and "time-slipping" (a kind of time travel) while falling from heights such as stairs. He can alter mechanical devices such as elevators and traffic lights. He can direct his powers to his ears to amplify his hearing, and he has also demonstrated hypnotism power, as evidenced when he hypnotized himself to be more decisive. Kyōsuke is also rarely shown to use his powers to temporarily amplify his speed and strength. On very rare occasions—generally, when Madoka is directly threatened—his power has taken the form of raw energy that can shatter concrete walls or short out every light in a disco. Kyōsuke is a pretty gentle person and a bit of a goody-goody—when he sees Madoka smoking, he scolds her in a very nerdy way (and then uses his powers to destroy her cigarette). It is his indecisiveness that leads to the love triangle with Hikaru and Madoka. He is unable to decide between his feelings for Hikaru and Madoka. Due to the loose manner that he and his sisters relate to each other, it is a running gag that many characters consider him a playboy and two-timing since it is believed he is dating Hikaru.
Madoka Ayukawa (鮎川 まどか, Ayukawa Madoka; voice: Hiromi Tsuru (Japanese), Saeko Shimazu (1985 Shonen Jump Special) )
The lead female character of the series. Despite appearing standoffish at first glance, she harbors a kind, altruistic personality underneath her tough exterior. Madoka has been friends with Hikaru and Yūsaku since childhood, and more recently has become friends with Kyōsuke. Though she has the reputation of a delinquent at school, where classmates refer to her as "Madoka the Pick", she is dedicated to academics, enjoys studying, and is also a very competent saxophone player. When she is not in class, she works part-time at the ABCB cafe. In truth, her capricious behavior as a young delinquent is just a masking of her sadness and loneliness, due to the fact that she is a misunderstood loner. She starts to be seen in another light thanks to Kyōsuke, and also reveals her real kind and selfless personality to most of the other characters. Madoka always tends to put others above her, and really dislikes being a burden to them. However, when Madoka and Kyōsuke both confess their true feelings for each other, she tells Kyōsuke that he has to break it off with Hikaru, who must understand the truth of the situation.
Madoka's parents are kind-hearted but workaholic professional musicians, often touring outside Japan, so she lives in a large house with her older sister. After her sister gets married and goes to live abroad with her husband, Madoka lives there alone. The story involves the eventual shedding of her tough exterior after she becomes Kyōsuke's friend, as evidenced by the changes in her life after she meets him. She gives up smoking because of him, and the other characters note that she becomes friendlier and does better academically following Kyōsuke's arrival.
As revealed in the last episode of the anime (which occurred near the end of the manga run), Madoka also holds a special place in her heart for a mysterious man whom she met under a tree in the past. Madoka drastically changed her appearance starting 6 years before, after her encounter with present-day time-traveling Kyōsuke, who in fact was stating his preferences based on the present-day Madoka. In the end, Madoka still did not know that Kyosuke was the mysterious man, but she senses a connection to him.
Creator Izumi Matsumoto reports that his inspiration for Madoka was actress Phoebe Cates and Japanese pop singer Akina Nakamori.
Hikaru Hiyama (檜山 ひかる, Hiyama Hikaru; voice: Eriko Hara (Japanese), Akari Hibino (1985 Shonen Jump Special) )
Hikaru is initially presented as being unpleasant, a brawler, and a tougher talker than Madoka, pretending to be a delinquent by riding motorcycles with older students and picking fights. But once she becomes friends with Kyōsuke after witnessing him make an impossible basketball shot with his esper powers, it is revealed that she is actually kind, sweet, and energetic, as well as very loyal to those she cares for. An accidental kiss between them leads Hikaru to declare them a couple. Hikaru is also somewhat child-like, especially since she is an only daughter and somewhat sheltered; when she gets extremely excited, she sometimes tends to revert to a form of baby talk, which is seen as cute by Japanese standards. She refers to Kyōsuke by the English word "Darling" (even before she knew his name).
Hikaru is two years younger than Madoka and Kyōsuke, and has the same birthday as Kyōsuke; she is also in the same classroom as Yūsaku Hino and the twins. She has feelings for Kyōsuke, who cares for her but more as a little sister than a prospective girlfriend, and has been Madoka's best and almost only friend for several years, since she and Yūsaku were the only ones who were never afraid of her. Hikaru befriended Madoka when a bully took away little Hikaru's favorite medallion, and a pre-teen Madoka witnessed this and stalked the bully until he returned it to Hikaru, sealing the girls' friendship.
Manami Kasuga (春日 まなみ, Kasuga Manami; voice: Michie Tomizawa (Japanese) )
One of Kyōsuke's younger twin sisters, Manami is very reserved. She is kind, quiet, and gentle, and depicted as the homemaker of the house—cooking meals, vacuuming, and doing laundry—but it is revealed in both the manga and anime that she has a wild side that occasionally needs release. Manami's esper powers include teleportation and telekinesis. Part of her reserved nature includes avoiding excessive use of the power unless it is absolutely necessary.
She is especially fond of Madoka and would like to see Kyōsuke and her get together. However, this never made it into the anime. As such, the anime version shows no such preference, though she and Kurumi at times urge Kyōsuke to choose between Madoka and Hikaru. But even in the manga, she is unaware of the situation between Kyōsuke and Madoka.
Kurumi Kasuga (春日 くるみ, Kasuga Kurumi; voice: Chieko Honda (Japanese) )
Manami's younger fraternal twin, Kurumi is very energetic and argumentative. She is also able to bring these qualities out in Manami as well. She is known to use idioms of her own creation, which can sometimes be misconstrued by others. Kurumi is most comfortable with using her powers, often doing so without thinking about the consequences. Kurumi used her powers to run the 100-meter dash in 3 seconds at her old school, which resulted in the Kasugas moving to the town where the series takes place. Kurumi's other esper powers include teleportation and telekinesis. She also possesses the ability to hypnotize, and Kyōsuke is her usual victim, although Kurumi appeared to learn this from a book.
In the manga, Kurumi wants Kyōsuke to end up with Hikaru. But, again, this storyline never made it into the anime, and the anime Kurumi shows no such preference despite sometimes urging her brother to choose between Hikaru and Madoka.
Takashi Kasuga (春日 隆, Kasuga Takashi; voice: Kei Tomiyama)
Kyōsuke's father, he works as a photographer and has no esper powers. He and his wife Akemi got together after she secretly helped him fulfill a test of character from her parents, and after her death, he has raised the three Kasuga children mostly on his own.
The Kasuga grandparents
Kyōsuke and the twins' maternal grandparents, and the ones from whom they inherited "The Power". They live in the mountains, running a ski resort. Both of them are psychics as well as very skilled with their abilities, which include teleportation and telekinesis. Their first names are never mentioned. They're very kind-hearted and affectionate fellows, and the grandfather is somewhat mischievous and lecherous as well. Grandpa Kasuga is voiced by Phil Ross in English.
Master (マスター, Masutā; voice: Yūsaku Yara)
Proprietor of the ABCB cafe located on Orange Road and Madoka's boss. He is one of the few characters who realizes how Madoka and Kyōsuke feel about each other, and does everything in his power to smooth relations between the two. In the manga he shuts down ABCB after it is discovered that Madoka was working there (Japanese middle school students can not hold jobs). In the novels it is revealed that he bounced back by opening one of the first cybercafes in Tokyo. He is voiced by Frank Page in English.
Seiji Komatsu (小松 整司, Komatsu Seiji; voice: Keiichi Nanba (Japanese) ) & Kazuya Hatta (八田 一也, Hatta Kazuya; voice: Naoki Tatsuta (Japanese) )
Kyōsuke's two bumbling sex-obsessed friends. They are also potential boyfriends for the twins, who are most likely using them as placeholders until someone better comes along. Kazuya Hatta is not to be confused with Kazuya Kasuga. Seiji's name has also been given as Masashi (most notably in the credits for "An Unexpected Situation"). In the novels, Kazuya becomes an aspiring manga author and gets trapped inside one of his stories, with Kyosuke bailing him out eventually. By the second film, they have achieved some success publishing girlie magazines.
Kazuya Kasuga (春日 一弥, Kasuga Kazuya; voice: Chika Sakamoto, Yuko Mita (1985 Shonen Jump Special) )
Kyōsuke's mischievous younger cousin, Kazuya looks like a younger version of him. On several occasions, people have mistaken Kazuya being Kyōsuke's son, and at others their physical similarities have been openly mentioned. Kazuya has "The Power" as well. In both the manga and the anime he uses telepathy almost exclusively, with telekinesis being used on very rare occasions. Kyōsuke and Kazuya can swap bodies by banging their heads together, and many stories with Kazuya involve him doing so either to avoid something unpleasant, or to "help" Kyōsuke pick which female to focus on. In the manga Kazuya has two female friends, and his situation with them somewhat mirrors the situation between Kyōsuke, Madoka, and Hikaru.
Akane Kasuga (春日 あかね, Kasuga Akane; voice: Naoko Matsui)
Kazuya's older sister, and the same age as her cousin Kyōsuke. She is rather tomboyish, and both Komatsu and Hatta are intimidated by her. Akane can use "The Power" to make people see illusions. She has only been seen using this power to make herself appear as different people; it is unknown if she can create other types of illusions. The illusions appear to be both aural and visual. In the manga, this power works only on the person it is directed towards, so it is probably a mixture of telepathy and hypnosis, elements of "The Power" which have been demonstrated in other members of the Kasuga family. In the anime she uses it on both Hatta and Komatsu at the same time.
In the manga, she develops a crush on Madoka, to the point of giving Kyōsuke a hickey while dreaming about Madoka. This leads to more than a few situations where she creates an illusion of herself as Kyōsuke in an attempt to determine just how the two of them feel about each other. Most of these situations end poorly for her and surprisingly, positively for Kyōsuke.
In the anime Akane has the same powers that Kyōsuke and the twins have, in addition to her illusion power. It is never indicated if this is true in the manga.
Akane's appearance in the manga and anime are quite different. In the manga she looks like a cross between Kurumi and Manami. In the anime her hair is shorter and darker, her face is more stark, and she has violet eyes. Akane only appeared in two of the OVAs (where she is shown to be rather infatuated with Madoka), and never in the TV series. She appears considerably more often in the manga, almost being a regular.
Yūsaku Hino (火野 勇作, Hino Yūsaku; voice: Masami Kikuchi (Japanese), Eiko Yamada (1985 Shonen Jump Special) )
Yūsaku initially appeared early in the series as a potential rival of Kyōsuke for Hikaru's affections, having harbored feelings for her since childhood. He asked her to marry him one day, and she jokingly said she would if he became stronger and self-assured. This sent him on the path of practicing karate for years. He views Kyōsuke as a womanizer on top of being a rival for Hikaru's love. Unfortunately for his romantic situation, he tends to get nervous and unable to speak in Hikaru's presence. As a result, she is mostly oblivious to his feelings, though she becomes very annoyed when Yūsaku becomes too pushy for her tastes.
Sayuri Hirose
Sayuri is an extremely cute girl who only appears in the manga, and whose seemingly innocent and pure demeanor hides a devious mind obsessed with breaking as many male hearts as possible. She carries a book where she tracks the various males that she has left heartbroken. At her first meeting with Kyōsuke, he leaves her to walk to class with Madoka. Because of this she becomes obsessed with both of them and comes up with various schemes to wreck their relationship. Most of her schemes involve bragging to Madoka that she's going to steal Kyōsuke, and then playing the role of the damsel in distress toward the kindhearted Kyōsuke. Fortunately, the schemes invariably backfire—often quite spectacularly.
Because she first saw Kyōsuke with Madoka, Sayuri assumes that the two are dating. Although Sayuri sees Kyōsuke on one occasion with Hikaru, there is no indication that she ever realizes that Hikaru is the one publicly acknowledged as Kyōsuke's girlfriend. This makes her pivotal in the manga, as she is the one who tells Hikaru about the relationship between Kyōsuke and Madoka, forcing the events that occur at the end of the manga.
Hiromi
Hiromi only appeared in the manga. She was Kyōsuke's classmate at his previous school, and transferred to Kōryō about halfway through the manga's run. She enjoys messing with Kyōsuke's head, and neither the reader nor Kyōsuke is sure if Hiromi knows about "The Power".
Ushiko and Umao (牛子 and 馬男, Ushiko and Umao; voice: Katsumi Suzuki and Chisato Nakajima)
Ushiko and Umao are a newlywed couple that serve as one of the primary running gags in the TV series. Their appearance in an episode generally consists of them saying the same romantic lines to one another, followed by a chaotic event involving Kyōsuke or other primary characters, sometimes in the most ludicrous places. In the movie Kimagure Orange Road: I Want to Return to That Day, their appearance is limited to Umao, who appears on television holding a crying baby and begging for Ushiko to return to him.
Ushiko and Umao's names are references to farm animals. Ushi (牛) and uma (馬) is Japanese for "cow" and "horse", respectively.

== Production ==
Kimagure Orange Road was commissioned by Weekly Shōnen Jump after rejecting Matsumoto's work "Spring Wonder". Several short manga that were precursors to Kimagure Orange Road were created prior and later published in a collection called Graffiti. Matsumoto later stated that Kimagure Orange Road was the first series to combine elements of science fiction and romantic comedy together.

Matsumoto and his three or four assistants worked in a one-room apartment, with Matsumoto saying he sometimes had to work in the bathroom due to a lack of space. One of his assistants was Kazushi Hagiwara. Because an art shift is seen in Kimagure Orange Road once it resumed from a Matsumoto health-related hiatus, it is rumored that Hagiwara was responsible for the change in style.

Protagonist Kyōsuke Kasuga seems to have been based on Matsumoto himself, the author saying "His nature was always my own." The series' setting was inspired by the Umegaoka, Gotokuji and Shimokitazawa neighborhoods in the Setagaya Ward of Tokyo. The café ABCB seen in the manga was inspired by a real one called Genso Katsudo Shashin Kan.

In a 2012 interview with Otaku USA, Matsumoto acknowledged that American actress Phoebe Cates had been an inspiration for Madoka Ayukawa's appearance.

Nippon Television producer Tōru Horikoshi was a fan of the manga and approached Shueisha about an anime adaptation. Horikoshi recalled that the production team was given creative freedom to expand and combine stories from the manga, with creator Izumi Matsumoto remaining supportive of the changes.

For the 1987 anime adaptation, character designer Akemi Takada sought to translate Matsumoto's illustrations into characters capable of expressing personality through movement and animation. In a 2025 interview, Takada recalled the importance of making characters recognisable by their silhouettes, citing Madoka and Hikaru as examples of this design philosophy. According to Akemi Takada, Izumi Matsumoto requested her involvement in the anime adaptation because he admired Magical Angel Creamy Mami. Takada also cited her previous work on Urusei Yatsura as an influence on her designs for Kimagure Orange Road.

== Media ==
=== Manga ===
Kimagure Orange Road was written and illustrated by Izumi Matsumoto and serialized in the shōnen manga anthology Weekly Shōnen Jump from issue No. 15 on March 26, 1984, to No. 42 on September 28, 1987. The 156 individual chapters were collected in 18 tankōbon volumes by Shueisha from September 10, 1985, through August 4, 1995. The series was republished in a 10 volume aizōban edition and a 10 volume bunkoban edition. A special chapter, "Panic in the Bathhouse!", was created for Matsumoto's Comic On CD-ROM manga series and published in Super Jump issue No. 10 of 1996. A second special was published in Weekly Playboy issue No. 44 of 1999.

In March 2013, Hivelinx released the manga first volume in English as an e-book for NTT Solmare's Facebook app "ComicFriends", and for Amazon Kindle and Apple iBooks. In March 2014, Digital Manga Guild acquired its rights and released Kimagure Orange Road through its eManga website. The series was expanded to 20 volumes for the English digital release. The manga was crowdfunded for a six volume omnibus print edition with a new translation, and reached its goal as of May 5, 2016. All six print omnibus volumes were made available for purchase exclusively on eManga's website and Amazon on May 13, 2019.

=== Anime ===
Kimagure Orange Road was adapted into an anime series broadcast on Nippon Television, animated by Studio Pierrot and directed by veteran animator Osamu Kobayashi with character designs by Akemi Takada and scripts by Kenji Terada, with Narumi Kakinouchi adding design work to the anime, as well as the opening and ending credits for episodes 1–8.

In October 2020, director Tomomi Mochizuki recalled that Izumi Matsumoto had been unaware of the 1988 film I Want to Return to That Day being made until shortly before dubbing began. During their only meeting, Matsumoto told Mochizuki that the film was very different from his manga, and later described the film as a parallel world separate from his original work.

AnimEigo licensed the first movie and the OVA series for North America on VHS and Laserdisc in 1993/1994. A subtitled Laserdisc and VHS release of the TV series was published in 1998.

AD Vision released the second movie to dubbed and subtitled VHS in 1998 and on DVD on August 21, 2001. However, this movie went out of print in 2009 after ADV's shutdown, since its license was not transferred to Section23 Films. This movie remains the only piece of the animated series that has been dubbed into English.

On February 1, 2002, a complete box set was released on DVD with updated and "improved" translations from the earlier VHS and LD releases. However, the company's decision to remove the opening and ending songs from each episode on the DVD release was heavily criticized by fans, forcing AnimEigo to release a public apology and a promise that they would correct their mistake once their initial press of the "flawed" DVDs were depleted. After a lengthy remastering process, the company made good on their promise and gave buyers the option of mailing in their original DVDs to receive a version that had the themes intact, free of charge. AnimEigo's translations were not legally available outside of North America, and their license for the TV series and OVAs expired 10 years after the initial licensing, in July and August 2006 respectively.

On September 1, 2017, Netflix in Japan began streaming the entire 48 episodes of Kimagure Orange Road with a new high definition transfer and restoration.

In August 2018, Discotek Media announced that it would release two Blu-ray Disc sets, one covering the television series and one covering the OVAs and the first movie. Features on the set include the original TV series remastered in high definition using the new transfer from Netflix Japan, creditless openings and endings, TV broadcast promos, translation notes, an art gallery, as well as the music video OVA "Their Love Repository." The TV series Blu-ray set was released on March 26, 2019.

On 20 October 2021, Toho released a nine-disc Blu-ray collection of Kimagure Orange Road in Japan, marking the series' Blu-ray debut in its home country. The collection contained all 48 television episodes, eight OVAs, music videos and the 1988 theatrical film I Want to Return to That Day, which received its first Japanese packaged home-video release.

In the UK, only the OVA series and first movie were released on VHS by MVM Films, subsequently receiving low sales likely due to the absence of the television series.

=== Soundtrack ===
Composed for the most part by Shirō Sagisu.

Anime television series

Opening Themes
#	Transcription/Translation	Performed by	Episodes
1	Night of Summer Side	Masanori Ikeda	1–19
2	Orange Mystery (オレンジ・ミステリー)	Nagashima Hideyuki	20–36
3	Kagami no Naka no Actress (鏡の中のアクトレス) (Actress in the Mirror)	Nakahara Meiko	37–48

Ending themes
#	Transcription/Translation	Performed by	Episodes
1	Natsu no Mirage (夏のミラージュ) (Summer Mirage)	Wada Kanako	1–19
2	Kanashii Heart wa Moete-iru (悲しいハートは燃えている) (Sad Heart Burning)	Wada Kanako	20–36
3	Dance in the Memories (ダンス・イン・ザ・メモリーズ)	Nakahara Meiko	37–48

OVA: "White Lovers" (1), "Hawaiian Suspense" (2), "I was a Cat, I was a Fish" (3), "Hurricane Akane" (4), "Stage of Love = Heart on Fire (Spring is for Idol)" (5), "Stage of Love = Heart on Fire (Birth of a Star!)" (6), "Unexpected Situation" (7), "Message in Rouge" (8)

Opening Themes
#	Transcription/Translation	Performed by	Episodes
1	Kagami no Naka no Actress (鏡の中のアクトレス) (Actress in the Mirror)	Nakahara Meiko	1–2
2	Choose Me (チューズ・ミー)	Tsubokura Yuiko	3–8

Ending themes
#	Transcription/Translation	Performed by	Episodes
1	Dance in the Memories (ダンス・イン・ザ・メモリーズ)	Nakahara Meiko	1–2
2	Tokidoki Blue (ときどきBlue) (Sometimes Blue)	Tachibana Yuka	3–6
3	Mou Hitotsu no Yesterday (もうひとつのイエスタデイ) (One More Yesterday)	Wada Kanako	7–8

Kimagure Orange Road Movie~ I Want to Return to That Day

Insert Songs
#	Transcription/Translation	Performed by	Episodes
	Futashika na I LOVE YOU (不確かなI LOVE YOU) (An Uncertain 'I LOVE YOU')	Wada Kanako	All
	Tori no you ni (鳥のように) (Like a Bird)	Wada Kanako	All

Ending themes
#	Transcription/Translation	Performed by	Episodes
	Ano Sora wo Dakishimete (あの空を抱きしめて) (Embrace That Sky)	Wada Kanako	All

New Kimagure Orange Road Movie ~ And, The Beginning of that Summer

Ending themes
#	Transcription/Translation	Performed by	Episodes
	Day Dream ~Soba ni Iruyo (Day Dream ~I'm at Your Side)	Agua	All

== Reception ==
Kimagure Orange Road was an instant success. The manga sold over 20 million tankōbon volumes in Japan.

=== Critical response ===
Reviewing Digital Manga Guild's first English release for Otaku USA, Che Gilson described Kimagure Orange Road as an enjoyable and classic manga. He wrote that "Even though it looks its age, the artwork is clean and easy to read, the characters are engaging and well drawn, and the simplicity has a charm all its own." However, he stated that the translation suffers from a lack of editorial oversight, with missing and misplaced words, sentences not fitting into their word bubbles, and awkward phrases.

Also of Otaku USA but looking back on the anime, Erin Finnegan wrote that the psychic powers are not important in the series, serving simply as an excuse for "zany plotlines" and gags, with the I Want to Return to That Day movie dropping them completely. She noted that the TV series does not have a resolution at the end and that viewers wanting closure have to watch I Want to Return to That Day, which she called "very touching, and very true to life." Anime News Network gave positive reviews for both the TV series and the I Want to Return to That Day movie. THEM Anime Reviews gave the TV series a rating of 5 out of 5.

The 1996 film New Kimagure Orange Road: Summer's Beginning received largely negative reception. Critics and fans described the film as a convoluted mess that lacked the emotional depth of the first movie, with many feeling it was an unnecessary addition to a story that had already reached a satisfying conclusion.

=== Cultural impact ===
Kimagure Orange Road is considered an influential series. The anime has been credited alongside Dragon Ball for introducing entire generations of Europeans to anime and manga.

According to manga critic Jason Thompson, Kimagure Orange Road is "The archetypal shonen rom-com" and had a major influence on the shonen romantic comedy genre. Although not the first to be made, it was the first to have significant popularity. He wrote that the series is about "first love and indecision, about the blurred lines between love and friendship, and it's all very close to reality, or better still a sweet, idealized, gentle reality." Thompson noted that the art is not great, but it gets better as the series continues. He also called Madoka the root of the tsundere archetype. The series influenced numerous later romantic comedies, including Video Girl Ai in the 1990s, Golden Time in the 2010s, and Seiren.

Manga UK notes that the Christmas episode ("Kyosuke Timetrips! The Third Christmas") featured an early use of the time loop plot device, predating the films Groundhog Day (1993) and Edge of Tomorrow (2014) and the "Endless Eight" arc of the Haruhi Suzumiya light novels (2004) and anime series (2009). In turn, Kimagure Orange Road's use of the time loop concept was predated by the anime film Urusei Yatsura 2: Beautiful Dreamer (1984).
