= Izumi Matsumoto =

Japanese manga artist (1958–2020)

- Born: Kazuya Terashima; October 13, 1958; Takaoka, Toyama, Japan
- Died: October 6, 2020 (aged 61)
- Occupation: Manga artist
- Known for: Kimagure Orange Road

Kazuya Terashima (Japanese: 寺嶋 一弥, Hepburn: Terashima Kazuya; 13 October 1958 – 6 October 2020), known by his pen name Izumi Matsumoto (まつもと 泉, Matsumoto Izumi), was a Japanese manga artist best known for Kimagure Orange Road. His career started in 1982, publishing his comic Milk Report in the manga magazine Weekly Shōnen Jump. But real success came in 1984, publishing Kimagure Orange Road in the same magazine.

In 2005, he revealed that he was afflicted with a cerebrospinal fluid disease (possibly stemming from a car accident when he was three years old) that had forced him to take six years off work, and he hoped to bring attention to this disorder through a new manga.

On 3 November 2019, Matsumoto revealed that he had been diagnosed with spinal stenosis. Matsumoto died at 61 on October 6, 2020.

== Career ==
Izumi Matsumoto began working for Weekly Shōnen Jump when he cold called them and formed a relationship with Toshimasa Takahashi, then a junior editor in charge of answering phones. His work "Live! Tottemo Rock 'n' Roll" then won a newcomer award. This led to the 1982 publication of Milk Report in Fresh Jump.

Just two years later he began Kimagure Orange Road in Weekly Shōnen Jump, which was an instant success. Following its end, he began Sesame Street (not to be confused with the television series of the same name) in Super Jump.

In 1994, Matsumoto conceived the idea for a digital manga on CD-ROM, the first of its kind. The five-volume Comic On was also possibly the first "trans-hemispheric manga compilation" as the semi-animated content set to music and dialogue also contained work by Jan Scott-Frazier and Lea Hernandez. Matsumoto set up his own company Genesis DPC to fund the project and partnered with Toshiba EMI to sell it. Manga publishers considered this a competitor, and Matsumoto struggled to get permission from Shueisha to use his own Kimagure Orange Road characters in the work.

== Works ==
- Kimagure Orange Road (1984–1987, Weekly Shōnen Jump)
- Comic Gunbuster (1989)
- Sesame Street (1990–1992, Super Jump)
- Comic On (1996)
- Digital Short Contents (2001)
