= One (manga artist) =

Japanese manga artist

- Born: Niigata, Japan
- Area: Manga artist
- Notable works: One-Punch Man; Mob Psycho 100; Versus
- Awards: Sugoi Japan Award (2016); Shogakukan Manga Award (2017)

Signature
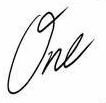

ONE (stylized in all caps) or Tomohiro is the pseudonym of a Japanese manga artist, who is best known for his web manga series One-Punch Man, which was later remade into a digital manga illustrated by Yusuke Murata. One serializes the One-Punch Man webcomic on his own website under no official publisher, while the manga remake is serialized in the web version of Weekly Young Jump. His other well-known series, Mob Psycho 100, was serialized in the online version of Weekly Shōnen Sunday, Ura Sunday.

== Early life ==
One was born in Niigata and grew up in Saitama. While visiting his grandparents in Niigata, his parents bought him a series of manga called Crayon Shin-chan by Yoshito Usui. One was a fan of the manga, which influenced his decision to become a manga artist, and began practicing on his notebook during middle and high school.

== Career ==
In July 2009, One began publishing a short version of One-Punch Man on Shintosha, a comic-posting website. He later began irregularly uploading One-Punch Man to his FC2 blog on July 3, 2009. Originally, One-Punch Man was intended to be a one-off to further practice drawing, but became a series following positive reception. Due to its humorous setting and story, One-Punch Man became popular in Japan. One had a special interest in creating a protagonist that had already become the strongest in the world, which enabled him to concentrate on a different perspective of the background and storytelling. One stated that he envisioned the protagonist, Saitama, as a character capable of adapting to the world that surrounded him, with his primary obstacles being mundane things. Before One decided to become a full-time manga artist, he had taken several hiatuses from updating the webcomic, including a one-year hiatus in February 2010 to work at a full-time job, and a two-year hiatus after releasing the 109th chapter in January 2017.

Manga artist Yusuke Murata was interested in One's work and eventually reached out to One. The two would collaborate in publishing two one-shots in 2012; Dotō no Yūshatachi, which released on April 1 in Weekly Young Jump, and Dangan Tenshi Fan Club, which released on April 17 in Miracle Jump. A remake of One-Punch Man began serialization in Shueisha's Tonari no Young Jump website on June 14, 2012. One-Punch Man would also receive an anime adaptation, announced in the 15th issue of Weekly Young Jump on March 10, 2015. The first season aired in Japan from October 5 to December 21, 2015, with live-action film adaptation also in development. The same year, One wrote and illustrated Mob Psycho 100, which began serialization in Shogakukan's Ura Sunday webcomic magazine on April 18, 2012. The protagonist, Shigeo Kageyama, is meant to come off as "somewhat standoffish or nerdy," while also possessing heroic traits. The series finished on December 22, 2017. On November 26, 2022, Versus began serialization in Kodansha's Shonen Sirius magazine, written by One and illustrated by Kyōtarō Azuma. On April 27, 2023, Bug Ego had its first chapter published in Weekly Young Jump, later getting an official serialization.

== Works ==
Title	Year	Publisher(s)	Notes	Ref.
One-Punch Man (ワンパンマン, Wanpanman)	2009–present	Self-published	Webcomic	
Angry Warriors (怒涛の勇者達, Dotō no Yūshatachi)	2012	Shueisha	With Yusuke Murata	
Bullet Angel Fan Club (弾丸天使ファンクラブ, Dangan Tenshi Fan Club)	2012	Shueisha	With Yusuke Murata	
Makai no Ossan (魔界のオッサン)	2012–2013	Shueisha	Webcomic	
One-Punch Man (ワンパンマン, Wanpanman)	2012–present	Shueisha	Manga remake, illustrated by Yusuke Murata	
Mob Psycho 100 (モブサイコ100, Mobu Saiko Hyaku)	2012–2017	Shogakukan	Manga	
Monster of Earth (地球の怪獣, Chikyū no Kaijū)	2013	Self-published	With Yusuke Murata and Kinu Nishimura	
Cockroaches Buster (ゴキブリバスター, Gokiburi Buster)	2015	Square Enix	With Yusuke Murata	
Reigen	2018–2019	Shogakukan	Spin-off manga of Mob Psycho 100	
Versus (バーサス, Bāsasu)	2022–present	Kodansha	With Kyōtarō Azuma and bose	
Bug Ego (バグエゴ, Bagu Ego)	2023–present	Shueisha	With Kiyoto Shitara	

== Awards and nominations ==
Year	Award	Category	Work/Nominee	Result
2014	7th Manga Taishō	Manga	One-Punch Man	Nominated
2015	26th Eisner Award	Best US Edition of International Material — Asia	One-Punch Man (published by Viz Media)	Nominated
2016	28th Harvey Awards	Best American Edition of Foreign Material	One-Punch Man (published by Viz Media)	Nominated
2016	2nd Sugoi Japan Award	Manga	One-Punch Man	Won
2017	62nd Shogakukan Manga Award	Shōnen	Mob Psycho 100	Won
2019	31st Harvey Awards	Best Manga	Mob Psycho 100 (published by Dark Horse Comics)	Nominated
2025	49th Kodansha Manga Award	Shōnen	Versus	Won
