= Ultra Jump =

Japanese manga magazine

- First monthly issue, cover dated November 1999; cover art by Range Murata
- Editor: Tomoyuki Shima
- Categories: Seinen manga
- Frequency: Quarterly (1995–1999); Monthly (1999–present)
- Circulation: 18,667; (July–September 2026)
- First issue: May 1995 (As a special issue in Weekly Young Jump); October 19, 1999 (As a monthly magazine)
- Company: Shueisha
- Country: Japan
- Based in: Tokyo
- Language: Japanese
- Website: ultra.shueisha.co.jp

Ultra Jump (Japanese: ウルトラジャンプ, Hepburn: Urutora Janpu) is a Japanese monthly seinen manga magazine published by Shueisha under the Jump line of magazines. New issues are released on the 19th of each month. Originally, the magazine was a special issue of Weekly Young Jump which was first issued in 1995. On October 19, 1999, the special issue became the new monthly publication Ultra Jump. The manga titles serialized in the magazine are published in tankōbon volumes under the Young Jump Comics Ultra label.

== History ==
Ultra Jump started as a special issue of the seinen anthology Weekly Young Jump called Young Jump: Ultra Special Issue: Ultra Jump (ヤングジャンプ超増刊ウルトラジャンプ, Yangu Janpu Chō Zōkan Orutora Janpu), first issued in 1995 with the cover date of May 17. The magazine was split to a monthly publication in 1999, simply called "Ultra Jump", with new issues published on the 19th of each month.

On March 19, 2008, Ultra Jump released an online spin-off of the magazine titled Ultra Jump Egg. It was an online manga website that mainly serialized titles not in the original Ultra Jump magazine. It has since merged back with its main magazine.

== Features ==
The magazine has been known for featuring fanservice-laden fantasy and science-fiction stories aimed at young adults, particularly otaku. Shueisha's light novel line, Super Dash Bunko, has close ties with the Ultra Jump magazine, as Ultra Jump supports the line by creating manga adaptations of the titles (e.g. Read or Die, Akikan!, and Denpa teki na Kanojo). One-shots from manga artists are featured regularly and are called Special One-Shot (特別読切, Tokubetsu yomikiri). Each issue includes an item featuring one or more series currently running in the magazine.

== Series in publication ==
Title	Illustrator/Author	Premiered	Ref.
Baby Road Trippers (ベイビー車中ハッカーズ)	Tabireco	August 2024	
Bastard!! Heavy Metal, Dark Fantasy (BASTARD!! -暗黒の破壊神-)	Kazushi Hagiwara	December 2000 (Note: The manga has been on indefinite hiatus since its last published chapter on May 19, 2010.)	
Bug Ego (バグエゴ)	One, Kiyoto Shitara	October 2024	
Dogs: Bullets & Carnage	Shirow Miwa	July 2005	
Gekkan Trilemma (月刊トリレンマ)	Tachibana Roku, Kashihara Madoka	March 2025	
Haha no Ai wa Mama Naranai! (義母の愛はママならないっ！)	Hominamia	January 2026	
Hai Kochira Kaikibu desu (ハイこちら解奇部です)	Shima Shinya	December 2025	
Itoko no Oneechan ni Amaechau? (いとこのお姉ちゃんに甘えちゃう?)	Kyouhei Igarashi	May 2024	
Konzukushi (こんづくし)	Ayami Morinaga	April 2025	
Love Live! Flowers: Hasunosora Girls' School Idol Club (ラブライブ! flowers＊ー蓮ノ空女学院スクールアイドルクラブー)	Tsumumi	November 2023	
Mahou Shoujo 201 (魔法少女201)	Mucha	November 2023	
Minami The Super Evolution (ミナミザスーパーエボリューション)	Shinji Mito	April 2025	
Recommendations from Iwamoto-senpai (岩元先輩ノ推薦)	Hiroshi Shiibashi	February 2021	
JoJo's Bizarre Adventure Part 9: The JoJoLands (ジョジョの奇妙な冒険 Part9 The JOJOLands)	Hirohiko Araki	February 2023	
Shepherd House Hotel (シェパードハウス・ホテル)	Kazuki Mori	December 2022	
Tadano Kōgyō Kōkō no Nichijō (只野工業高校の日常)	Chisato Oga	July 2019	
Valhalla Ochinchin-kan (ヴァルハラ・オティンティン館)	Gurashi, Yuni	September 2020	
