= Kōji (given name) =

- Gender: Male

Origin
- Origin: Japanese
- Meaning: Different meanings depending on the kanji used

Kōji, Koji, Kohji or Kouji is a masculine Japanese given name.

== People with the name ==
Notable people bearing the name include:

- Koji Abe (あべ こうじ; born 1975), Japanese comedian
- Koji Aihara (相原 コージ; born 1963), Japanese manga artist
- Koji Akiyama (秋山 幸二; born 1962), Japanese retired professional baseball player
- Koji Aoyama (青山 浩二; born 1983), Japanese former professional baseball pitcher
- Koji Arimura (有村 光史; born 1976), Japanese former football player
- Koji Ariyoshi (有吉 幸治; 1914–1976), American labor activist and a Sergeant in the United States Army
- Koji Asano (浅野 浩司; born 1974), Japanese musician and composer
- Koji Bonishi (坊西 浩嗣; born 1968), Japanese former baseball player
- Kōji Chikamoto (近本 光司; born 1994), Japanese professional baseball outfielder
- Koji Chino (千野 皓司; 1930-2022), Japanese film director
- Koji Chubachi (中鉢 孝治; born 1985), Japanese instructor
- Koji Date (伊達 幸志; born 1987), Japanese actor and singer
- Koji Doi (土肥 孝司; born 1990), Japanese professional wrestler
- Koji Emura (江村 宏二; born 1961), Japanese fencer
- Koji Enokura (榎倉 康二; 1942–1995), Japanese painter and installation artist
- Koji Ezumi (江角 浩司; born 1978), Japanese footballer
- Koji Fujikawa (藤川 康司; born 1978), Japanese former footballer
- Kōji Fukada (深田 晃司; born 1980), Japanese film director
- Koji Fukuda (born 1940), Japanese rower
- Koji Fukushima (福島 康司; born 1973), Japanese former professional racing cyclist
- Kōji Fukutani (福谷 浩司; born 1991), Japanese professional baseball pitcher
- Koji Funamoto (船本 幸路; born 1942), Japanese former football player
- Koji Futada (二田 孝治; born 1938), Japanese retired politician
- Kōji Gotō (後藤 孝志; born 1969), Japanese former Nippon Professional Baseball infielder
- Kōji Gushiken (具志堅 幸司; born 1956), Japanese Olympic gymnast
- Koji Gyotoku (行徳 浩二; born 1965), Japanese coach and former footballer
- Koji Hachisuka (蜂須賀 孝治; born 1990), Japanese football defender
- Kōji Hanada (花田 光司; born 1972), Japanese sumo wrestler
- Koji Haramaki (服巻 浩司; born 1971), Japanese voice actor
- Kōji Harashima (原島 宏治; 1909–1964), Japanese politician and religious leader
- Koji Hashimoto (director) (橋本 幸治; 1936–2005), Japanese film director and producer
- Koji Hashimoto (footballer) (橋本 晃司; born 1986), Japanese football player
- Koji Higashino (東野 幸治; born 1967), Japanese comedian and TV presenter
- Koji Hirabayashi (born 1942), Canadian wrestler
- Kōji Hirayama (平山 幸司; born 1969), Japanese politician
- Koji Hirose (廣瀬 浩二; born 1984), Japanese retired footballer
- Koji Homma (本間 幸司; born 1977), Japanese former football player
- Koji Horaguchi (洞口 孝治; 1953–1999), Japanese former rugby union player
- Koji Igarashi (五十嵐 孝司; born 1968), Japanese video game producer and director
- Koji Ikeda (池田 幸司; born 1997), Japanese professional kickboxer
- Koji Imada (今田 耕司; born 1966), Japanese comedian, tarento and TV presenter
- Koji Inada (稲田 浩司; born 1964), Japanese manga artist
- Kōji Ishii (石井 康嗣; born 1960), Japanese voice actor
- Kōji Ishikawa (illustrator) (いしかわこうじ; born 1963), picture-book author and illustrator
- Kōji Ishinriki (維新力 浩司; born 1961), Japanese former sumo wrestler
- Kōji Ishizaka (石坂 浩二; born 1941), Japanese actor
- Koji Ito (伊東 浩司; born 1970), Japanese retired track and field sprinter
- Koji Iwamoto (岩本 煌史; born 1990), Japanese professional wrestler
- Koji Iwamoto (ice hockey) (岩本 宏二; born 1942), Japanese ice hockey player
- Koji Kakamu (各務 耕司; born 1977), Japanese judo coach and former judoka
- Kōji Kakinuma (柿沼 康二; born 1970), Japanese calligrapher
- Koji Kakizawa (柿澤 弘治; 1933–2009), Japanese politician
- Koji Kakuta (角田 幸司; born 1951), Japanese ski jumper
- Kōji Kamibayashi (髪林 孝司; born 1960), Japanese founder and former CEO of TV Tokyo Broadband
- Koji Kamoji (鴨治 晃次; born 1935), Japanese/Polish contemporary artist
- Koji Kanemoto (金本 浩二; born 1966), Japanese professional wrestler
- Koji Kataoka (片岡 功二; born 1977), Japanese former football player
- Koji Kato (加藤 浩次; born 1969), Japanese comedian, actor, and TV presenter
- Kōji Kikkawa (吉川 晃司; born 1965), Japanese singer, musician and actor
- Koji Kimura (木村 興治; born 1940), Japanese table tennis player
- Koji Kinutani (絹谷 幸二; 1943–2025), Japanese Yōga painter
- Kōji Kiriyama (桐山 光侍; born 1970), Japanese manga artist
- Koji Kishio (岸尾 光二; born 1951), Japanese scientist
- Kōji Kita (北 公次; born 1949), Japanese member of Four Leaves
- Kōji Kitao (北尾 光司; 1963–2019), Japanese sumo wrestler, professional wrestler and mixed martial artist
- Kōji Kobayashi (boxer) (小林 光二; born 1957), Japanese retired professional boxer
- Koji Kobayashi (engineer) (小林 宏治; 1907–1996), Japanese engineer and businessman
- Koji Kobayashi (corporate executive) (小林 耕士; born 1948), Japanese business executive
- Kōji Kojima (小島 孝治; 1930–2014), Japanese Olympic volleyball coach
- Koji Kominami (小南 光司; born 1994), Japanese actor and model
- Koji Komuro (小室 宏二; born 1977), Japanese judoka and amateur mixed martial arts fighter
- Koji Kondo (近藤 浩治; born 1960), composer of video game music
- Koji Kondo (footballer) (今藤 幸治; 1972–2003), Japanese football player
- Koji Kumagai (熊谷 浩二; born 1975), Japanese former football player
- Kōji Kumeta (久米田 康治; born 1967), Japanese manga artist
- Koji Kuramoto (蔵本 孝二; born 1951), Japanese former judoka
- Koji Kurihara (栗原 浩司; born 1964), Japanese sprinter
- Koji Kuriyama (born 1960), Japanese luger
- Koji Maeda (前田 浩二; born 1969), Japanese former football player and manager
- Kōji Makaino (馬飼野 康二; born 1948), Japanese pop music composer, arranger and musician
- Koji Masuda (益田 弘二; born 1944), Japanese boxer
- Koji Masunari (舛成 孝二; born 1965), Japanese director
- Koji Matoba (的場 浩司; born 1969), Japanese actor and television personality
- Koji Matsui (handballer) (松井 幸嗣; born 1957), Japanese handball player
- Koji Matsui (politician) (松井 孝治; born 1960), Japanese politician
- Kōji Matsushita (松下 浩二; born 1967), Japanese former international table tennis player
- Koji Miki (三木 功司; born 1946), Japanese weightlifter
- Koji Mise (三瀬 幸司; born 1976), Japanese baseball player
- Kōji Mitsui (三井 弘次; 1910–1979), Japanese actor
- Kouji Miura (三浦 糀; born 1995), Japanese manga artist
- Koji Miyajiki (宮食 行次; born 1995), Japanese goalball player
- Koji Miyakawa (宮川 光治; born 1942), Japanese former member of the Supreme Court of Japan
- Koji Miyamoto (流 智美; born 1957), Japanese professional wrestling historian
- Koji Miyata (宮田 孝治; born 1923), Japanese former football player
- Koji Miyoshi (三好 康児; born 1997), Japanese footballer
- Koji Mizoguchi (born 1963), Japanese archaeologist and a professor of social archaeology
- Kouji Mori (森 恒二; born 1966), Japanese manga artist
- Kōji Morimoto (森本 晃司; born 1959), Japanese anime director
- Kōji Morisaki (森﨑 浩司; born 1981), Japanese former football player
- Kohji Moritsugu (森次 晃嗣; born 1943), Japanese actor
- Kōji Morooka (師岡 宏次; 1914–1991), Japanese photographer
- Koji Mukai (向井 康二; born 1994), Japanese singer, tarento and actor
- Koji Murofushi (室伏 アレクサンダー広治; born 1974), Japanese former hammer thrower and sports scientist
- Koji Nagai (永井 浩二; born 1959), Japanese businessman, CEO of Nomura Holdings
- Koji Nagai (baseball) (永井 浩二; born 1971), Japanese baseball coach
- Koji Nakagawa (中川 浩二; born 1968), Japanese semi-retired professional wrestler
- Koji Nakajima (中島 浩司; born 1977), Japanese former football player
- Kōji Nakamoto (仲本 工事; 1941–2022), Japanese comedian
- Koji Nakamura (中村 弘二; born 1977), Japanese musician, and former guitarist and lead singer for the Japanese rock band Supercar
- Koji Nakanishi (中西 香爾; 1925–2019), Japanese chemist
- Koji Nakano (composer) (中野 浩二; born 1974), Japanese composer
- Koji Nakano (water polo) (中野 皓司; born 1947), Japanese former water polo player
- Kōji Nakano (writer) (中野 孝次; 1925–2004), Japanese writer, translator and literary critic
- Koji Nakao (中尾 康二; born 1981), Japanese former football player
- Kōji Nakata (中田 浩二; born 1979), Japanese former professional footballer
- Koji Nakazato (中里 宏司; born 1982), Japanese former football player
- Kōji Nanbara (南原 宏治; 1927–2001), Japanese actor
- Koji Nisato (似里 浩志; born 1980), Japanese curler
- Koji Nishimura (西村 弘司; born 1984), Japanese former football player
- Koji Nishio (born 1977), Japanese classic NES Tetris player
- Koji Noda (野田 紘史; born 1986), Japanese footballer
- Koji Noguchi (野口 幸司; born 1970), Japanese former football player
- Koji Nonoshita (野々下 耕嗣; born 1937), Japanese former freestyle swimmer
- Kōji Ochiai (落合 弘治; born 1966), Japanese actor and voice actor
- Koji Ogata (尾方 弘二; born 1968), Japanese instructor of Shotokan karate
- Koji Ohmura (大村 公二; born 1981), Japanese Special make-up effects artist
- Koji Ohshiro (大城 滉二; born 1993), Japanese professional baseball player
- Kouji Okada (岡田 耕始), Japanese video game producer and director
- Koji Okajima (岡島 功治; born 1957), Japanese retired competitive pair skater and figure skating coach
- Koji Okubo (諸橋 轍次; 1887–1950), Japanese orientalist
- Koji Okumura (奥村 晃司; born 1998), Japanese footballer
- Kōji Omi (尾身 幸次; born 1932), Japanese politician
- Koji Onuma (大沼 幸二; born 1979), Japanese former professional baseball pitcher
- Koji Orita (織田 紘二; born 1945), Japanese performing arts producer, director, playwright, and author
- Koji Ota (太田 幸司; born 1952), Japanese former professional baseball pitcher
- Koji Ryu (笠 浩二; 1962-2022), Japanese member of C-C-B
- Koji Saito (athlete) (斉藤 晃司; born 1973), Japanese paralympic athlete
- Kōji Saitō (photographer) (斎藤 鵠児; 1893–????), Japanese photographer
- Kōji Sakai (酒井 鎬次; 1885–1973), Japanese lieutenant general
- Koji Sakamoto (坂本 紘司; born 1978), Japanese former football player
- Koji Sakui (born 1956), Japanese fellow of the Institute of Electrical and Electronics Engineers
- Koji Sakurai (桜井 孝次; born 1936), Japanese triple jumper
- Koji Sakurama (桜間 幸次; born 1938), Japanese sport wrestler
- Koji Sasaki (佐々木 康治; born 1936), Japanese footballer
- Koji Sato (engineer) (佐藤 恒治; born 1969), Japanese mechanical engineer
- Kōji Satō (photographer) (佐藤 虹児; 1911–1955), Japanese amateur photographer
- Koji Sato (politician) (佐藤 公治; born 1959), Japanese politician
- Kōji Sawai (澤井 幸次; born 1952), anime director
- Koji Seita (清田 孝司; born 1980), Japanese former footballer
- Koji Seki (関 浩二; born 1972), Japanese former football player
- Kōji Seki (関 孝二; born 1911), Japanese film director
- Koji Sekimizu (関水 康司; born 1952), Japanese official who was Secretary General of the International Maritime Organization
- Kōji Seo (瀬尾 公治; born 1974), Japanese manga creator
- Kōji Seto (瀬戸 康史; born 1988), Japanese actor
- Koji Shima (島 耕二; 1901–1986), Japanese film director, actor and screenwriter
- Koji Shimizu (清水 康次; born 1969), Japanese long-distance runner
- Kōji Shiraishi (白石 晃士; born 1973), Japanese filmmaker and occasional actor
- Koji Shitara (設楽 幸嗣; born 1946), Japanese composer and former actor
- Koji Sone (曽根 康治; 1928–1981), Japanese judoka and world champion
- Koji Sotomura (外村 康二; born 1958), Japanese gymnast
- Koji Steven Sakai, American screenwriter and producer
- Koji Sugeno (菅野 浩二; born 1981), Japanese wheelchair tennis player
- Koji Suzuki (鈴木 光司; 1957–2026), Japanese writer
- Koji Suzuki (footballer) (鈴木 孝司; born 1989), Japanese footballer
- Koji Tachiki (立木 浩二; born 1960), Japanese former handball player
- Koji Taira (平 浩二; born 1983), Japanese former rugby union player
- Kōji Takahashi (高橋 幸治; born 1936), Japanese actor
- Kōji Takeda (武田 幸史; born 1982), Japanese voice actor
- Koji Takei (竹井 昂司; born 1990), Japanese water polo player
- Koji Takeuchi (born 1974), Japanese mixed martial artist
- Kōji Taki (多木 浩二; 1928–2011), Japanese critic, photographer and philosopher
- Kōji Tamaki (玉置 浩二; born 1958), lead singer of Anzen Chitai (安全地帯)
- Koji Tanaka (田中 孝司; 1955–2026), Japanese football player
- Kōji Tanami (田波 耕治; born 1939), Japanese Governor of the Japan Bank for International Cooperation
- Kōji Tanigawa (谷川 浩司; born 1962), Japanese shogi player
- Kōji Tatewaki (帯刀 光司; 1993–2025), Japanese singer known professionally as luz
- Koji Tokunaga (徳永 耕治; born 1968), Japanese baseball player
- Koji Tomita (冨田 浩司; born 1957), Japanese diplomat
- Koji Toriumi (鳥海 晃司; born 1995), Japanese professional footballer
- Kōji Tosa (土佐 浩司; born 1955), Japanese shogi player
- Kōji Totani (戸谷 公次; 1948–2006), Japanese voice actor
- Koji Toyoda (豊田 耕児; born 1933), Japanese classical musician
- Kōji Tsujitani (辻谷 耕史; 1962–2018), Japanese actor, voice actor, narrator and director of audiography
- Koji Tsuruoka (鶴岡 公二; born 1952), Japanese diplomat
- Kōji Tsuruta (鶴田 浩二; 1924–1987), singer and actor
- Koji Tsuzurabara (黒葛原 浩二; born 1964), Japanese volleyball coach
- Koji Uehara (上原 浩治; born 1975), Japanese baseball player
- Kōji Ueno (上野 耕路; born 1960), Japanese composer, musician, arranger and keyboardist
- Kōji Uno (宇野 浩二; 1891-1961), Japanese novelist and short story writer
- Kōji Wada (和田 光司; 1974–2016), Japanese pop singer
- Kōji Wada (actor) (和田 浩治; 1944–1986), Japanese actor
- Kōji Wakamatsu (若松 孝二; 1936–2012), Japanese film director
- Koji Wakasa (若狭 浩嗣; born 1953), Japanese ice hockey player
- Koji Wakayoshi (若吉 浩二; born 1961), Japanese water polo player
- Koji Watanabe (渡邊 康二; born 1942), Japanese tennis player
- Kōji Yada (矢田 耕司; 1933-2014), Japanese actor, voice actor and narrator
- Kōji Yakusho (役所 広司; born 1956), Japanese actor
- Koji Yamada (山田 浩二; 1887–1941), Japanese billiards world champion
- Koji Yamamoto (actor) (山本 耕史; born 1976), Japanese actor and singer
- Koji Yamamoto (baseball, born 1946) (山本 浩二; born 1946), Japanese former baseball player and manager
- Koji Yamamoto (basketball) (山本 浩二; 1952–2001), Japanese basketball player
- Koji Yamamoto (baseball, born 1951) (山本 功児; born 1951), Japanese Nippon Professional Baseball infielder
- Kōji Yamamura (山村 浩二; born 1964), Japanese independent animator
- Koji Yamamuro (山室 光史; born 1989), Japanese gymnast
- Koji Yamanishi (山西 康司; born 1977), Japanese professional race car driver
- Koji Yamasaki (baseball) (山﨑 浩司; born 1980), Japanese professional baseball infielder
- Koji Yamasaki (field hockey) (山﨑 晃嗣; born 1996), Japanese field hockey player
- Koji Yamase (山瀬 功治; born 1981), Japanese football player
- Kōji Yamazaki (山崎 幸二; born 1961), Japanese general
- Koji Yanagi (柳 広司; born 1967), Japanese writer of mystery and thriller
- Koji Yasumi (八角 浩司; born 1957), Japanese former rugby union player
- Koji Yoshimoto (吉本 光志; born 1980), Japanese retired kickboxer and mixed martial artist
- Koji Yoshimura (吉村 光示; born 1976), Japanese former football player
- Koji Yoshinari (吉成 浩司; born 1974), Japanese former football player
- Kōji Yusa (遊佐 浩二; born 1968), Japanese voice actor

== Fictional characters ==
- Koji, character from Brawlhalla
- Kouji (Kenny), character from Stitch!
- Kohji Haneda, character from Case Closed
- Koji Haruta, character from Toradora!
- Koji Kabuto, character from Mazinger Z
- Kouji Kasuga, character from Silver Kamen
- Koji Koda, character from My Hero Academia
- Kouji Minamoto, character from Digimon Frontier
- Koji Nakano, character from Captain Tsubasa
- Koji (Ōban), character from Ōban Star-Racers
- Kouji Sekimukai, character from Haikyū!!
- Koji Senoo, character from Ojamajo Doremi
- Koji Tanaka, character from Ajin: Demi-Human
- Koji Tongari, character from Kiteretsu Daihyakka
- Koji Tonoo (戸尾耕司), character from Saya no Uta
