= List of Beet the Vandel Buster chapters =

First tankōbon volume cover, released by Shueisha on October 4, 2002

The chapters of the manga series Beet the Vandel Buster This is a list of chapters for the manga series are written by Riku Sanjo and illustrated by Koji Inada. The story is set in a world whose people are living under the rule of devils, or Vandels, who is able to manipulate monsters. The Vandel Busters are a group of people who hunt these devils. Of them, the Zenon Squad is known to be the strongest busters on the continent. A young boy, Beet, dreams of joining the Zenon Squad. However, Beet's enthusiasm leads him to endanger the Zenon squad during a battle and they are defeated by the Vandel Beltose. The five dying busters sacrificed their life power to their five soul weapons, Saiga, which they gave to Beet. Years have passed since then and the young Vandel Buster, Beet, begins his adventure to carry out the Zenon Squad's will to put an end to the rule of Vandels.

The manga was published in Shueisha's Monthly Shōnen Jump in Japan from 2002 until September 2006, when Inada became ill. On December 17, 2015, it was reported that the manga will resume in the Spring 2016 issue of Jump SQ.Crown. The manga ran in Jump SQ. Crown until October 2016. It has been published in Jump SQ.Rise since April 2018.

Viz Media published the first twelve volumes in English.

== Volume list ==
No.	Original release date	Original ISBN	English release date	English ISBN
1	October 4, 2002	4-08-873290-1	October 12, 2004	978-1-59116-690-0
001. "The Boy Rises"; 002. "He Who Returned!"; 003. "Time of Departure"; Special Feature- Beet: "The World (Part 1)"
2	January 6, 2003	4-08-873373-8	December 7, 2004	978-1-59116-691-7
004. "The Arch-Enemy Arises"; 005. "The Target: Beet!"; 006. "Clash of the Vandels!!!"; Special Feature- Beet: "The World (Part 2)"
3	April 4, 2003	4-08-873415-7	February 2, 2005	978-1-59116-693-1
007. "The Clash with Beltorze!"; 008. "Wake Up, Beet!!"; 009. "The Death Match!!"; 010. "To the New World!!"
4	August 4, 2003	4-08-873501-3	April 5, 2005	978-1-59116-750-1
011. "In Enemy Territory!!"; 012. "Flashy Frausky"; 013. "The Third Teammate!"; 014. "A Friend's Betrayal"; Special Feature- Beet: "The World (Part 3)"
5	November 4, 2003	4-08-873530-7	May 31, 2005	978-1-59116-806-5
015. "Roar, Cyclone Bullett!!"; 016. "Rise, Friend!"; 017. "Cry in My Arms!"; 018. "Lightning Attack Milfa!"
6	March 4, 2004	4-08-873581-1	August 3, 2005	978-1-59116-871-3
019. "Golden Flash!!"; 020. "Bloody Storm-Grineed's Castle"; 021. "The Beast Revealed!"; 022. "Power vs. Power!"; Special Feature- Beet: "The World (Part 4)"
7	July 2, 2004	4-08-873635-4	October 10, 2005	978-1-4215-0076-8
023. "The Final Counterattack!!"; 024. "Risk It All!!"; 025. "Farewell, Clever Honcho of Deep Green!"; 026. "To the New Continent!!"
8	October 4, 2004	4-08-873674-5	December 6, 2005	978-1-4215-0147-5
027. "Put the Ocean Devils to Rout!!"; 028. "Bekatrute Calls Forth the Storm!!"; 029. "Thrill of the Immovable Giant!!"; Special Feature- Beet: "The World (Part 5)"
9	April 4, 2005	4-08-873798-9	April 4, 2006	978-1-4215-0270-0
030. "Unexpected Rescue"; 031. "Soul of the Saiga"; 032. "Cain's True Identity"; 033. "Fang Resurrected!"; Special Feature- Beet: "The World (Part 5)"
10	October 4, 2005	4-08-873857-8	October 3, 2006	978-1-4215-0771-2
034. "Five Warriors Move Out!"; 035. "Battle at Maniyon Island"; 036. "Annihilation!"; 037. "Garonewt's True Power!"; 038. "Strike Down the Past!"
11	April 4, 2006	4-08-874045-9	April 3, 2007	978-1-4215-1157-3
039. "The Immoveable Giant Falls!"; 040. "The Memory of That Day"; 041. "Zenon Shines!"; 042. "Challenge from the Sky!"; 043. "The Frightening Baron!"; Special Feature- Beet: "The World (Part 6)"
12	September 4, 2006	4-08-874257-5	October 2, 2007	978-1-4215-1406-2
044. "The Demon of the Red Moon!!"; 045. "The Deadly Technique!!"; 046. "Broken Heart!"; 047. "Stop the King of the Sky!!"
13	November 4, 2016	978-4-08-880862-8	–	—
048. "The Revived Genius!"; 049. "The Haughty King!"; 050. "Last Chance!"; 051. "The True Saiga Awakens!"; 052. "End of a Legend!"
14	June 4, 2019	978-4-08-881847-4	–	—
053. "The Messenger From Gransista!"; 054. "Duel! Saiga vs. Saiga!"; 055. "New Strategy Enlightenment!!"; 056. "Dark Clouds Looming!!"; 057. "Stormy Gransista!"; Special Feature- Beet: "The World (Part 7)"
15	October 2, 2020	978-4-08-882390-4	–	—
058. "The King's Judgment!"; 059. "Assassin's Dagger Assault!"; 060. "Ah! Laio!"; 061. "The One Who Saves Beet!"; 062. "The Knight of Resurrection!"
16	April 4, 2022	978-4-08-883091-9	–	—
063. "The Ghastly Ghost Ship!"; 064. "A Hellish Counterattack!"; 065. "Duel of the Flames!"; 066. "With All My Strength!"; 067. "Fang's Retaliation!"
17	July 4, 2023	978-4-08-883658-4	–	—
068. "The Roar of a New Saiga!"; 069. "The Despairing Excursion!"; 070. "Immortality VS Recklessness!"; 071. "Goodbye...!"; 072. "The Big Crash!"
18	October 4, 2024	978-4-08-884220-2	–	—
073. "Resurgence!"; 074. "To the Great Edge of the Land!"; 075. "The Mountains of Mischief!"; 076. "Attack! The Vandel Scholar!"
19	January 5, 2026	978-4-08-884710-8	–	—
