= Kishio =

Kishio (written: 岸尾) is a Japanese surname. Notable people with the surname include:

- Daisuke Kishio (岸尾 だいすけ, born 1974), Japanese voice actor, singer and narrator
- Koji Kishio (岸尾 光二, born 1951), Japanese scientist

Kishio (written: 毅司雄 or 木志雄 is also a masculine Japanese given name. Notable people with the name include:

- Kishio Suga (菅 木志雄, born 1944), Japanese sculptor and installation artist
- Kishio Tanaka (田中 毅司雄, born 1946), Japanese swimmer
