= Kiriyama =

Kiriyama (written: 桐山 lit. "Paulownia tomentosa mountain") is a Japanese surname. Notable people with the surname include:

- Kiyozumi Kiriyama (桐山 清澄, born 1947), Japanese shogi player
- Kōji Kiriyama (桐山 光侍), Japanese manga artist
- Renn Kiriyama (桐山 漣, born 1985), Japanese actor

== Fictional characters ==
- Rei Kiriyama (桐山 零), protagonist of the manga series March Comes in like a Lion
- Yui Kiriyama (桐山 唯), a character in the light novel series Kokoro Connect
- Kazuo Kiriyama (きりやま かずお), a character in the novel, manga and film Battle Royale

== See also ==
- Kiriyama stable, a defunct stable of sumo wrestlers
- Kiriyama Prize, a former international literary award
