= Koji =

Koji, Kōji, Kohji or Kouji may refer to:

- Kōji (given name), a masculine Japanese given name
- Kōji (Heian period) (康治), Japanese era, 1142–1144
- Kōji (Muromachi period) (弘治), Japanese era, 1555–1558
- Koji orange, a Japanese citrus cultivar
- Andrew Koji Shiraki (born 1987), singer/songwriter known as Koji
- Koji, the software that builds RPM packages for the Fedora project
- Koji (food), molds used to ferment food
- Koji, an interactive content creation tool from GoMeta

== See also ==
- Kojii, music project by Kojii Helnwein
- Coji-Coji (コジコジ), an anime series sometimes romanized Koji Koji
