= Miyakawa =

Miyakawa (written: 宮川) is a Japanese surname. Notable people with the surname include:

- Daisuke Miyakawa (宮川 大輔, born 1979), Japanese footballer
- Koji Miyakawa (宮川 光治, born 1942), Japanese judge
- Sae Miyakawa (宮川 紗江, born 1999), Japanese artistic gymnast
