= List of Shuriken Sentai Ninninger episodes =

Shuriken Sentai Ninninger is a 2015 Japanese television series, and is the 39th entry of the long-running Super Sentai series produced by Toei Company. Three generations had passed since Yoshitaka Igasaki, a man known as the Last Ninja, sealed the evil Yokai feudal lord Gengetsu Kibaoni. However, Yoshitaka's disgraced ex-disciple, Izayoi Kyuuemon, freed Gengetsu Kibaoni's spirit and revived his retainers. As only those of the Igasaki bloodline can stop the Kibiaoni Army, Tsumuji Igasaki has his children Takaharu and Fuka recruit their friends Yakumo Kato, Nagi Matsuo, and Kasumi Momochi so they can be trained to use Shuriken Ninja Arts and fight the Yokai as Ninningers.

The series is directed by Shōjirō Nakazawa and written by Kento Shimoyama. It premiered on TV Asahi on February 22, 2015. The opening theme is "Saa Ike! Ninninger!" (さぁ行け! ニンニンジャー!, Saa Ike! Ninninjā!; "Let's Go! Ninninger!") by Yohei Onishi (大西 洋平, Ōnishi Yōhei) while the ending theme is "Nan ja Mon ja! Ninja Matsuri!" (なんじゃモンじゃ! ニンジャ祭り!; "What's That?! A Ninja Festival!") by Daiki Ise (伊勢 大貴, Ise Daiki).

== Episodes ==
No.	Title	Written by	Original release date
1	"We Are Ninja!"; Transliteration: "Oretachi wa Ninja da!" (Japanese: 俺たちはニンジャだ！)	Kento Shimoyama	February 22, 2015 (Note: The series was originally scheduled to premiere on February 15, 2015. However, it was postponed due to the media coverage of the death of Japanese journalist Kenji Goto by the Islamic State of Iraq and the Levant on February 1, which delayed the airing of the finale of the previous series Ressha Sentai ToQger, by one week.)
Returning to the Igasaki Ninjutsu Dojo after four years, a youth finds it blown apart as an army of soldier-like creature storm the ruins. The youth decides to deal with the Hitokarage, introducing himself as Takaharu Igasaki while transforming himself into a red suited ninja to dispatch them as a mysterious figure takes a mallet from the dojo. Takaharu's younger sister Fuka Igasaki arrives soon after, believing Takaharu destroyed their family dojo before their father Tsumuji Igasaki arrives. Tsumuji explains to his children that he gave Takaharu a Ninja Ichibantou while sending out summons for them and their friends. Once Takaharu and Fuka are joined by their friends Yakumo Kato, Nagi Matsuo, and Kasumi Momochi, Tsumuji reminds them of their family history as descendants of ninja who fought during the Sengoku Era and how their late grandfather, the Last Ninja Yoshitaka Igasaki, sealed the spirit of the deceased warlord Gengetsu Kibaoni. Explaining that Kibaoni's prophecy of resume his campaign is to occur this year, Tsumuji rallied his children, and friends to ensure he is not revived. But after Fuka and her friends express an disinterest, Tsumuji takes them and Takaharu to Kibaoni's grave. Though Fuka and the friends are skeptic, the Sealing Shuriken littering the tomb are suddenly scattered as Kibaoni's spirit commands his forces to revive him through the Power of Fear. The ninja arrive to the city to find the people before attacked by the Hitokarage before they seeing one of the Sealing Shuriken bonding onto a chainsaw that transforms into Yokai Kamaitachi. Takaharu, seeing the others frighten, decides to deal with the Hitokarage and Kamaitachi on his own. Inspired by Takaharu's resolve, Fuka and her friends find their courage as Tsumuji arrives with their Ninja Ichibantou. Takaharu regroups with his sister and their friends before their transform into the Shuriken Sentai Ninninger. After the Hitokarage are dealt with, with the others supporting him, Aka Ninger destroys Kamaitachi. But the mysterious figure, witnessing the fight from afar, revives Kamaitachi into a giant. After being knocked a few blocks away by Kamaitachi, the Ninningers find themselves with new Nin Shuriken that causes them to summon the Otomonin that eventually combine into Shurikenzin to destroy the Yokai. Soon after finding the purified Sealing Shuriken that emerged after Kamaitachi's death, the Ninningers realize their mission is to find the Sealing Shuriken. But the group are shocked to learn that Yoshitaka is still alive as he tells them that they need improvement.
2	"Become the Last Ninja!"; Transliteration: "Rasuto Ninja ni Naru!" (Japanese: ラストニンジャになる！)	Kento Shimoyama	March 1, 2015
Revealed to be alive, Yoshitaka takes his son, his daughter and friends to a new ninjutsu dojo where he explains the Ninningers need to improve their skill in the Shuriken Ninja Arts while promising to name one among them who has most improved as successor to the title of Last Ninja. Yoshitaka takes his leave, leaving Tsumuji to oversee his son, his daughter and friends' training with the Five-Style Nin Shuriken he left behind. While the others are unable to properly use the Five-Style Nin Shuriken, with Fuka taking the blunt of the attacks, Yakumo shows excellent progress to the point of saying ninjutsu is too easy. Takaharu takes offense to Yakumo bad mouthing their grandfather and demands an apology before the Gamagama-Ju firearms alert the Ninningers to a Yokai attack. The Ninningers face the Yokai Kappa, the others overpowered by him before Ao Ninger drives Kappa off with a fire-infused attack. But this causes friction between Takaharu and Yakumo with the latter taking his leave. Finding that Kasumi followed him, Yakumo confines that he is not interested in becoming a ninja before reconsidering it after Kasumi uses a play on words to rattle him a bit. When Yakumo finds Kappa, he fails to realize that the Yokai would counter his previous attack and finds himself saved by Takaharu at the last second. After Takaharu explains that he can boast once he actually succeeds their grandfather as the others arrive, Yakumo transforms as he and his cousin both destroy Kappa together. But the mysterious figure revives Kappa into a giant with the Ninningers forming Shurikenzin to fight him. But after Ao Ninger saves Shinobimaru with Dragomaru, he reforms Shuirikenjin into Shurikenzin Drago to destroy the Yokai. Soon after finding a purified Sealing Shuriken, Yakumo explains that he has no interest in being a ninja but will prove himself better than Takaharu and their grandfather none the less. Meanwhile, the mysterious figure revives one of Kibaoni's generals with the Power of Fear that he had amassed.
3	"The Formidable Enemy Gabi Appears!"; Transliteration: "Kyōteki, Gabi Arawaru!" (Japanese: 強敵、蛾眉あらわる！)	Kento Shimoyama	March 8, 2015
After reviving Kibaoni's general Raizo Gabi, reintroducing herself to him, Kyuemon Izayoi asks for his help in reviving Kibaoni. But Raizo has no interest in helping her as he walks off to find someone worth fighting. The next day, after Yoshitaka scolds Takaharu for failing a team exercise, the Ninningers confront Nagi about his addiction to text books before they are alerted to an attack by Yokai Kasha. During the fight, Ki Ninger ends up accidentally letting the Yokai escape and runs off to find him. As Takaharu ends up running into Kyuemon while following him, Nagi finds Kasha and the Yokai challenges him to a race. However, Kasha places a truck under his control to dispose of Ki Ninger before dealing with Ao Ninger, Shiro Ninger, and Momo Ninger. But Raizo shows up and personally kills Kasha before single-handedly overpowering the three Ninningers. Disappointed in such weak opponents, Raizo was about to kill them when Takaharu saves them and holds the villain off. As the others save Ki Ninger, Aka Ninger defeats Raizo who is excited to finally find a worthy opponent and wants another fight before Momo Ninger covers their escape. After the Ninningers regroup, they are confronted by Kyuemon as he reveals the mallet he stole from the dojo and Kasha's Sealing Shuriken as he transforms it into a Yo Shuriken that he uses to summon a Gashadokuro that is destroyed by Shurikenzin. Soon after boxing up his text books, Nagi considers becoming the Last Ninja to build up his resume.
4	"It Is Here! Paonmaru!"; Transliteration: "Deta Zō! Paonmaru!" (Japanese: でたゾウ！パオンマル！)	Kento Shimoyama	March 15, 2015
After Takaharu bungles up a simulation training course meant for team-building, the Ninningers receive a message from Yoshitaka that the cryptically hints that they can use Sealing Shuriken like Kyuemon. After a couple more training courses, Fuka confronts Takaharu about acting on his own despite taking out all the enemies. Tsumuji suggests the others continuing training while Takaharu ponders where he is going wrong in the training. While eating at an oden stand, Takaharu is alerted to an attack by the Yokai Tsuchigumo. Though the others arrive, Aka Ninger ends up being sucked into the Yokai's stomach and finds the oden cart owner to be Yoshitaka as he teaches his grandson the value of teamwork through oden. Meanwhile, forced to fall back, the Ninningers formulate a plan to save Aka Ninger. By then, with Yoshitaka using a wind-style attack to boost his fire-style attack, Takaharu manages to escape and rejoin his team. Aka Ninger remembers his lesson as he lets Ao Ninger lead the attack so they can finish Tsuchigumo with a team attack. This causes the Sealing Shuriken on Aka Ninger's person to transform as Kyuemon revives Tsuchigumo with the Otomonin summoned to fight him. When Otomonin are trapped in Tsuchigumo's webbing, Aka Ninger uses the new Otomonin Shuriken to summon Paonmaru to free the others before forming Shurikenzin Paon to finish the Yokai off. Later, after the Ninningers obtain the Sealing Shuriken and head home, Kyuemon convinces Raizo to assist her with the promise of having his fight with Takaharu.
5	"The Space Ninja UFOmaru!"; Transliteration: "Uchū Ninja Yūfōmaru!" (Japanese: 宇宙忍者UFOマル！)	Kento Shimoyama	March 22, 2015
Alerted by Gamagama-Ju, the Ninningers see the Yokai Ungaikyo making children happy by giving them balloons. This puts the Ninningers in a situation where they decide to keep an eye on Ungaikyo. During the stake-out, Yakumo notices Kasumi is tired and thinks she is having trouble and Yakumo believes she must be trying to juggle being a ninja and a university student as she reveals she wants to know if their grandfather actually spoke to aliens. Later, after Kasumi returned to the university, the other Ninningers find Takaharu slacking off. It was then that multiple images of Kibaoni manifest. Kasumi arrives, revealing the Kibaoni to be illusions created by Ungaikyo with Aka Ninger unknowingly revealing the Yokai's method to though the balloons after he hampered Shinobimaru and Dragomaru's movement. Though Yakumo believes that Takaharu could be inspirational to her, he learns Kasumi never intended to give up on either a ninja or student as she reveals to have developed a device to cancel out Ungaikyo's frequency. After Aka Ninger knocks Ungaikyo down with the Paonmaru Otomonin Shuriken, the Ninningers regroup and finish the Yokai off. By then, Raizo arrives for his rematch before Kyuemon enlarges Ungaikyo to the general's annoyance. After Aka Ninger promises to deal with Raizo later, attempting to use the new Otomonin Shuriken they got, the Ninningers form Shurikenzin Drago to chase Ungaikyo into outer space where they encounter a flying saucer. After the flying saucer is the Otomonin UFOmaru, they combine with it to reform Shurikenzin Drago into Shurikenzin UFO to destroy Ungaikyo on the moon. Later, Kasumi reveals that she already parsed out Ungaikyo's scheme and that she wants to be both a scientist and the Last Ninja, Takaharu then realizes that he has completely forgotten his promise to face Raizo as the villain is lividly waiting for him.
SP	"Shuriken Sentai Ninninger vs. Kamen Rider Drive: Spring Break Combined 1 Hour Special"; Transliteration: "Shuriken Sentai Ninninjā Tai Kamen Raidā Doraibu Haruyasumi Gattai Ichijikan Supesharu" (Japanese: 手裏剣戦隊ニンニンジャーVS仮面ライダードライブ 春休み合体1時間スペシャル)	Riku Sanjo	March 29, 2015
The Ninningers appear to face the Yokai Buruburu, who escapes after slowing them down with his Heavy Acceleration. Soon after, Shinnosuke Tomari, aka Kamen Rider Drive and his partner Kiriko Shijima arrive to arrest them upon confusing them with Roidmudes. Takaharu is then taken into custody while the others flee. At the Special Investigations Division, Shinnosuke and Kiriko inquire Takaharu until he decides to escape by himself. Kyuemon rejoices upon gathering so much fear with Buruburu and it is shown that he is in cahoots with the Roidmudes. Yoshitaka appears to pick up Takaharu in the Special Investigations Division while Go watches over a mysterious phenomena appearing in the sky when a warrior introducing himself as Kamen Rider 3 attacks him. Shinnosuke and Takaharu find the other Ninningers under Buruburu's spell, shaking in fear and Takaharu uses a fire technique to release his companions and reveal the Yokai, who is shown to be a combination of the Sealing Shuriken and a Viral Core, proving that the Ninningers are not the real enemy. While the Ninningers fight Buruburu, Shinnosuke transforms into Kamen Rider Drive to confront three Roidmudes who appear to attack him. Once Buruburu is finished, Kyuemon retrieves its Sealing Shuriken and entrusts it to one of the Roidmudes, while using its mallet to enlarge the other two, with one of them grabbing Drive with its hand. Ninningers form Shurikenzin to fight back, rescuing the Kamen Rider and forming Shurikenzin UFO to finish them. However, UFOmaru suddenly disappears and Kyuemon reveals that the Ninningers were sent by a dimensional distortion to the Kamen Riders' world, and they will all soon disappear as well, before fleeing by a portal.
6	"Tengu's Spiriting Away"; Transliteration: "Tengu no Kamigakushi" (Japanese: テングの神隠し)	Kento Shimoyama	April 5, 2015
After Tsumuji's ninja midterm test, Takaharu is forced to take a retest due to his very low score while the others are alerted to a Yokai attack. They face the Yokai Tengu, only to be defeated by him and Raizo with the latter annoyed to not find Takaharu among them. Tengu tells the Ninningers to tell Takaharu to meet them at Cape Kinme while taking Fuka with him and Raizo. When Takaharu learns of this, despite the others' attempt to stop him and Tsumuji kept from joining the fray due to his inability to use ninjutsu, runs off before being found by Yoshitaka who gives him advise. But Kyuemon appears and Yoshitaka, revealing that he and the figure know each other, holds him off while Takaharu arrives to Cape Kinme. Raizo orders Tengu to release Fuuka before telling Takaharu to follow him into the Yokai's dimension to have their match. As Akaninger and Raizo commence their death battle in Tengu's dimension, Tengu attempts to have Fuuka express fear before the other Ninningers arrive and fight the Yokai. Takaharu is almost killed in his battle before the other Ninningers defeat Tengu, Aoininger reminding him they are a team as the Ninningers work together to defeat Raizo. Kyuemon appears and takes Raizo away while the Ninningers use Shurikenjin Paoon to break an enlarged Tengu's nose before destroying him. Later, the Ninningers are welcomed back by Tsumuji who apologizes for being unable before help them being astonished that the gang want to retest to get better. But as the group head home, they are observed by two red-clad ninja.
7	"Spring Ninja Festival!"; Transliteration: "Haru no Ninja Matsuri!" (Japanese: 春のニンジャ祭り！)	Kento Shimoyama	April 12, 2015
As the Ninningers train to get stronger, Tsumuji reveals that he called in two senior ninja to help them train: Sasuke of the Kakurangers and Yousuke of the Hurricanegers. After having the Ninningers attempt basic ninjustsu with poor success, Sasuke and Yosuke deem Takaharu the ill-prepared of the lot as the group are altered to a Yokai. The senior ninja tie up Takaharu before leading the others Ninningers to deal with the Yokai Nekomata, who faunts his powers before being found by Kyuemon as he requests the Yokai's help in finding the End Shuriken. After overpowering the ninja, Nekomata opens a Time Door to 2005 and enters it with Takaharu, who broke free, chasing after him. Ninja Red and Hurricane Red would reveal that they faced Nekomata five years ago in a battle that appear to have killed Akaninger. By then, Nekomata returns to the present and hands what he believes to be the End Shuriken to a Jyukkarage. Sasuke and Yousuke were about to fight Nekomata when Takaharu appears, who reveals he used a substitution jutsu to fake his death and quickly followed Nekomata as the Time Door closes. After the Ninningers transform, impressed with their junior's skills in a combat situation, Ninja Red and Hurricane Red use a Mangetsu Giri/Shippu Zan combo to weaken Nekomata for Akaninger to lead the deathblow while gaining two Nin Shuriken in his seniors' image. The ninja soon find Kyuemon, who is livid that Nekomata gave him one of Sasuke's shurikens rather than the End Shuriken. Kyuemon proceeds to summon a Gashadokuro that the Ninningers manage to destroy after using the Kakuranger and Hurricaneger Shurikens to power up Shurikenjin. Later, having left without a goodbye, Ninja Red and Hurricane Red are impressed by the Ninningers as they are joined by Akarenger and Yoshitaka.
8	"The Nekomata Who Leapt Through Time!"; Transliteration: "Toki o Kakeru Nekomata!" (Japanese: 時をかけるネコマタ！)	Kento Shimoyama	April 19, 2015
As Nagi starts going to Fuka's school, Takaharu, Yakumo, and Kasumi find themselves dealing with Nekomata before they manage to destroy him. While Yakumo and Kasumi are perplexed on why Nekomata survived their last encounter, the Yokai revives himself as he offers his services to Kyuemon to find the End Shuriken. After school ends, Fuka finds her social life threatened when Takaharu invites her friends Kana and Mariko over as he and the others were training in a game of hide and seek. By then, on Kyuemon's order, Nekomata attacks a group of people before he is defeated by Akaninger and Momoninger so his core can be brought to their dojo. Once revived, Nekomata takes Fuka's friends hostage before he travels back to 2005 with Takaharu and Fuka following and finding themselves at the Igasaki Dojo. The two get help from their younger selves in luring out Nekomata and save Kana and Mariko before they return to their time. The Ninningers then regroup with Shironinger leading the attack while tricking Nekomata into revealing the source of his revivals is his clock stomach. Once Shironinger damages his stomach, she and Akaninger destroy Nekomata with their Kyodai NinRestsuzan attack. After reviving Nekomata as he destroyed by a Shironinger-piloted Shurikenjin Paoon, the fight witnessed by a mysterious ninja, Kyuemon has a realization on the End Shuriken.
9	"Ninjutsu vs. Magic, the Great Battle!"; Transliteration: "Ninjutsu Tai Mahō, Dai Batoru" (Japanese: 忍術VS魔法、大バトル！)	Kento Shimoyama	April 26, 2015
The Ninningers are alerted to a Yokai, only to find a Sealing Shuriken instead and realize someone else is fighting the Yokai. The ninja return into time to watch a report involving Yakumo's mother Harukaze Kato, learning the End Shuriken is a relic safeguarded by the Last Ninja as its power can destroy the world. While Tsumuji explains he saw the item in the old dojo, he is shocked to find the End Shuriken as a brooch in his sister's latest clothing line. After Yakumo's attempt to convince his mother to give it to them, the Ninningers decide to steal it. However, as the Ninningers plot to switch the shuriken for a fake, Kyuemon learned of the End Shuriken's whereabouts and Raizo decides to provide him with a Sealing Shuriken infused with his power along with a group of Hitokarage that he promotes to Jyukkarage. Kyuemon uses the shuriken to create Ittan-momen, who turns Fuuka into a mouse while sicing the Jyukkarage on them. After fending off the Jyukkarage, Aoninger using a clone jutsu to compensate for the magically afflicted, the Ninningers race to the backstage with Momoninger apparently turned into a mouse while Kininger is turned to a rock. Ultimately, while Akaninger is turned into an action figure, Ittan-momen obtained the dress and holds Harukaze hostage to make his escape. However, revealed to have substituted a real mouse in her place, Kasumi posed as a Jyukkarage before revealing herself while getting Harukaze to safety. Furthermore, the Aoninger on the stage was a clone with the real Yakumo magically forcing Ittan-momen to restore the others to normal. Taking the fight outside, and turning the Juukarage into turtles, Aoninger enlists Akaninger's help to finish Ittan-momen with the Magical Ninja Slash team attack. Then Kyuemon appeared out of nowhere to steal the End Shuriken, only for it to be revealed to be a fake and leaves while enlarging Ittan-momen. Ittan-momen manages to turn Shurikenjin Drago into stone before a golden ninja appears with a pair of Otomonin to hold off the Yokai before becoming the mecha into Bison King to destroy him and then taking his leave. Later, while the Ninningers are curious over where the real End Shuriken is, Yoshitaka is attacked by the mysterious ninja.
10	"Yee-haw! The Golden Star Ninger"; Transliteration: "Hīhā! Kiniro no Sutāninjā" (Japanese: ヒーハー！金色のスターニンジャー)	Kento Shimoyama	May 3, 2015
After Yoshitaka comes to the dojo wounded, the others attempting to calm Takaharu down and their only clue that the attacker is from another place, the Ninningers decide to find the one responsible while Nagi and Kasumi remain with Tsumuji. The next day, the Ninningers stake out the park before Takaharu encounters the attacker, who reveals himself to be the mysterious ninja as he defeats him, Aoninger and Shironinger. The ninja, calling himself Starninger, formally introduces himself as self-titled Yokai hunter Kinji Takigawa and that he was responsible for destroying the Yokai the Ninningers were not able to encounter. But upon hearing of the Yokai already killed, Kinji freaks out over not coming to Japan sooner before being alerted to a Yokai minutes before the other Ninningers. After an attempted selfie with the Yokai Daidarabochi, who was terrorizing workers, Kinji proceeds to fight the Yokai while the other Ninningers arrive to protect the workers. After seeing Starninger saving a girl from being, Fuka noticing he is like Takaharu, Kininger and Momoninger arrive and reveal Kinji only attacked Yoshitaka to prove his worth as a ninja apprentice. As the other Ninningers deal with the Juk, Starninger gets into a rivalry with Akaninger before destroying Daibarabochi while taking his selfie with the Yokai. After Kyuemon revives Daiabara, Starninger summons Rodeomaru and Bisonmaru to fight the Yokai before Shurikenjin Pao joins the fray. Star Ninger than forms Bison King to finish Daibarabochi off. Soon after, via arrow, Yoshitaka gives a message to Kinji that he will make the youth his student if he defeats Takaharu and Fuka, who in turn will have their assassin as a training regime. At the same time, Raizo has fully healed and decides to settle things with Takaharu.
11	"Shinobimaru, Come Back!"; Transliteration: "Shinobimaru, Kamu Bākku!" (Japanese: シノビマル、カムバーック！)	Kento Shimoyama	May 10, 2015
Having made attempts on Takaharu's life since Yoshitaka offered him apprenticeship, Kinji has been living with the Ninningers. But he and Yakumo are unable to get along before Kinji is alerted to Youkai Enraenra with a Gashadokuro appearing. While the other Ninningers track down Enraenra, Akaninger is forced to leave Aoninger and Starninger to fight the Gashadokuro on their own when Shinobimaru runs off. After Kasumi gives Takaharu a Nintranslator device to find out what's wrong, she and the others realize the Otomonin is affected by Enraenra's smoke with Nagi and Fuka effected as well. This turns out to be all part of Kyuemon's plan to separate Takaharu from the others so Raizo can have his duel. Meanwhile, Aoininger and Momoninger manage to restore their team mates before they attacked by Enreanra with Starninger and Aoninger destroying the Yokai as he is revived a giant. After his duel with Raizo ended, Akaninger arrives with a restored Shinobimaru to finish the Youkai with Shurikenjin and Bison King off before losing consciousness.
12	"Ultimate Battle! Miraculous Combination"; Transliteration: "Saikyō Kessen! Kiseki no Gattai" (Japanese: 最強決戦！奇跡の合体)	Kento Shimoyama	May 17, 2015
Revealed to have been defeated by Raizo and saved by Shinobimaru, Takaharu will be able to fight for a while. Later after meeting with Yoshitaka, Kinji reveals to Kasumi that he created his Otomonin as he learns she is trying. By that time, fulfilling his end of the deal with Kyuemon to help him, Raizo launches an attack on the city. Takaharu comes to and learned from Kinji that the others are fighting Raizo, attempting to make his way to them. But Kinji fights Takaharu to keep him from meddling on the others' behalf, only to be convinced to join the fray instead. Upon arriving, While the other Ninningers deal with the Jyukkarage, Akaninger duels Raizo with Star Ninger holding Kyuemon at bay. Noting he fighting with more than just his strength, Akaninger uses a manifested Combination Nin Shuriken to defeat Raizo. While Raizo accepts his death with grace, calling Takaharu by his full name out of respect, Kyuemon refuses to let him die and enlarges him into a mindless giant with two Gashadokuro. Though Shurikenjin and Bision King are formed, Raizo overpowers them by using a giant sword created from the Gashadokuro. But Akaninger uses the new Nin Shuriken to combine Shurikenjin and Bision King into King Shurikenjin, destroying the Gashadokuro with Raizo allowed to die in peace. Later, looking at a photo, Kinji is found by Yoshitaka who revealed that he refused to take an apprentice because he did once and that figure became Kyuemon. Meanwhile, Kyuemon uses the fear he gathered to bring another of Kibaoni's followers back to life.
13	"Burn! Ninja Athletic Meet"; Transliteration: "Moeyo! Ninja Undōkai" (Japanese: 燃えよ！ニンジャ運動会)	Kento Shimoyama	May 24, 2015
As Yoshitaka advises Kinji to take the challenge for the right to become his apprentice seriously, Kyeumon uses the fear he gathered from Raizo's rampage to revive another of Kibaoni's followers: Tsugomori Masakage, who informs Kyuemon that Kibaoni's revival is near. At the dojo, after Kinji tells the others that he will not be helping them anymore, the Ninningers learn of a Ninja Sports Festival. Throughout the contest, his quarry having competition in other ninja groups, Starninger makes attempts on the Ninningers' life in the a perilous flag race and then Ball Rolling. During a lunch break, offering Kinji to join him and the others, Nagi learns the figures in Kinji's photo to be his father and older brother. Kinji explains his father and brother are dead, and that he wants to follow in their footsteps as a Yokai hunter by becoming Yoshitaka's apprentice. The two then notice two of the officials to be Jyukkarage in disguise and tell the others as they get ready for the four-legged obstacle race. While Yakumo and Kasumi expected it and trap the Jyukkarage, only for them and the others to be captured. Takaharu, Nagi, and Kinji then encounter Masakage, who conjures a pair of track shoes to create Yamawarawa to race against the three Ninningers with the prize being their friends. Despite a rough start, Yamawarawa using dummies instead of actual Jyukkarage and confronting phantoms in the forms of their teammates, Kininger manages to take the lead for his team and win the four-legged race. Once the others the freed, the Ninningers battle the Jyukkarage while Akaninger and Starninger destroy Yamawarawa with a team attack. After being revived by Kyuemon, an enlarged Yamawarawa overwhelms Shinobimaru and Rodeomaru before Dumpmaru saves them before they form King Shurikenzin to finish the Yokai off. After expressing that he had fun dealing with the Last Ninja's students, Masakage reveals to Kyuemon that he knows the ward was with Kibaoni and warns him that he will kill him if he does anything he finds untoward. Later, Yoshitaka contacts the Ninningers that Masakage will be a greater challenge than Raizo and gives them a new challenge to find the Heavenly Otomonin.
14	"Beware of "Help-Me" Scam!"; Transliteration: "Tasukete Sagi ni Goyōjin!" (Japanese: 助けてサギにご用心！)	Kento Shimoyama	May 31, 2015
After another attempt on Takaharu's life by Starninger, Fuka scolds his brother and Kinji before the Gamagama-Guns alert everyone to a Yokai presence. Splitting up to cover ground while dealing with, Kinji apologizes to Fuka for causing her to lose her temper over his attack on Takaharu while telling about the relationship he had with his brother. Meanwhile, after getting a strange call from Fuka, Takaharu convinces the other Ninningers to give him their Change Shurikens. By the time the others arrive, it turned out that "Fuka" was actually Yamabiko as he calls the real Fuka to get her Change Nin Shuriken as part of Masakage's plan. However, after finding Fuka to be not as easy to trick as her brother, Yamabiko finds himself facing Takaharu and the others as Fuka and Kinji. After Kinji and Fuka learn what happened, they transform to fight before Shironinger manage to steal the Nin Shuriken back. After the others transform, get sucked punched by the Yokai, the transformed Ninningers destroy Yamabiko with a team attack. When Yamabiko is revived, he uses his Super Sonic Blast to disable the Otomonin before Wanmaru cripples him for Shurikenzin and Bison King to finish the Yokai off. Later, having set up how Kinji's assassination attempts will occur on a daily basis, Fuka trains with Takaharu to become stronger.
15	"Yokai, I Never Failed"; Transliteration: "Yōkai, Watashi Shippai Shinai node" (Japanese: 妖怪、ワタシ失敗しないので)	Kento Shimoyama	June 7, 2015
Halfway in his deadline, Starninger attempts to ambush Kasumi while she is teaching Nagi and Fuka. But he finds himself trapped in her shadow binding jutsu before advised to go after Takaharu and Yakumo instead. But upon seeing Akaninger and Aoninger looking for the Heavenly Otomonin on their Otomonin, Kinji decides to not interrupt them before being alerted to a Yokai and leaves Rodeomaru to regroup with the others. Upon seeing an Gashadokuro with eyebrows, Kinji finds Rodeomaru not responding to his summons as Shurikenzin is formed. But Rodeomaru suddenly arrives and aids the Gashadokuro, revealed to be under the control of the Yokai legal representative Futakuchi-onna. As Kininger and Shironinger are forced to pilot Shurikenzin on their own with Paonmaru and UFOmaru in destroying the Gashadokuro while Shinobimaru deals with Rodeomaru, Yakumo and Kasumi attempt to help Kinji when Futakuchi-onna offers a contract to return rights to Rodeomaru to Kinji with a conference room like dimension. But as the fight gets severe, with Shurikenzin defeated while another Gashadokuro appears, Kinji signs the contract in desperation and falls under Futakuchi-onna's spell. Things seem hopeless until Kasumi plays on Futakuchi-onna pride as a businesswoman and convinces her to stand up to Masakage, tricking her into breaking her contracts out of spite. Realizing too late that she was tricked, Futakuchi-onna is knocked back into normal space with the regrouped Ninningers easily defeating the Yokai. As this occurred, after he and Bison King destroy the Gashadokuro, Kinji meets with Kyuemon in private. Explaining that it was Yoshitaka who betrayed him because he is not an Igasaki, Kyuemon offers an alliance with Kinji before taking his leave.
16	"The Father Tsumuji Is a Super Ninja!?"; Transliteration: "Chichi Tsumuji wa Sūpā Ninja!?" (Japanese: 父ツムジはスーパー忍者!?)	Nobuhiro Mouri	June 14, 2015
Using some Jyukkarage, Masakage formulates a scheme to locate the Ninningers' base. After the Niningers take out their stalkers, Takaharu and Fuka deciding to take a detour to buy father's day presents. After commenting how much his children and their friends improved, Tsumuji heads out for a bargin deal at a supermarket. But this was part of Masakage's plan as he creates Kasabake from Tsumuji's pen, having the Yokai cause a downpour and posing as a free umbrella to have Tsumuji take him to the dojo. But the Ninningers, alerted by the Gamagama-Guns, managed to expose Kasabake in time before Tsumuji reached the dojo. Tsumuji feels bad about making such a mistake, revealing to Takaharu and Fuka that he was a ninja prodigy who lost his ability to use ninjutsu with his son resolving to help their father out. The next day, with the Ninningers working their ninjutsu in the back ground, Tsumuji poses as a super ninja while luring Kasabake to a quarry so the Ninningers can fight him. But Kasakake turns out to be very powerful, overwhelming the Ninningers until Tsumuji finds himself using the Tornado Jutsu and helps Akaninger defeat the Yokai. After Kasabake is revived, the Yokai grounded by UFOmaru and then destroyed by King Shurikenzin. Later, his ability to use jutsu as a response to his need to protect his family, Tsumuji receives a new pen from his children as they accompany him to buy some food.
17	"Goodbye, Star Ninger!"; Transliteration: "Gubbai, Sutāninjā!" (Japanese: グッバイ、スターニンジャー！)	Kento Shimoyama	June 21, 2015
With only one day left to prove himself to Yoshitaka, Kinji is visited by Kyuemon who wants to know if the human consider his proposal. After Kinji asks Kyuemon what the End Shuriken is, learning it has destroy worlds and create new ones, he requests one more day to decide. The next day, having learned of Kinji's plight, the Ninningers want to help by giving him letters of challenge. But at a beach, concealing the Yokai's creation from the Gamagama-Guns, Masakage has Umibozu lure Kinji and have him experience his past: a werewolf and his father and brother. Alerted by Tsumuji of a Yokai sighting, the Ninningers arrive to the beach and chase after Kinji into the illusionary space Umibozu created. After helping Takaharu with his fear of green peppers, the Ninningers find Kinji as he watches his father and brother killed. After being told that he in an illusion, Kinji realizes he does not have what it takes to be Yoshitaka's apprentice before the others give him the courage to not give up. After breaking free of the illusion, the other Ninningers fight the Jyukkarage while Akaninger and Starninger destroy Umibozu. But when Umibozu is revived and overpowers Shurikenzin from the sea, Akaninger uses the new Otomonin Shuriken he gained from his bond with Kinji summon an Otomonin that Starninger christens Sufermaru, which form the core of Shurikenzin Surfer to destroy Umibozu. With the Yokai dealt with, Takaharu and Kinji were about to duel before Yoshitaka appears and reveals that the deadline was actually yesterday. Heartbroken as Yoshitaka reveals the truth of Kyuemon to his Takaharu and Fuka to explain his reasons to them, Kinji takes his leave in Sufermaru.
18	"The Yokai That Yakumo Loved"; Transliteration: "Yakumo ga Aishita Yōkai" (Japanese: 八雲が愛した妖怪)	Nobuhiro Mouri	June 28, 2015
19	"Find! The Sky Otomonin"; Transliteration: "Sagase! Tenkū no Otomonin" (Japanese: 探せ！天空のオトモ忍)	Kento Shimoyama	July 5, 2015
20	"The Chozetsu! Lion Haoh!"; Transliteration: "Za Chōzetsu! Raion Haō!" (Japanese: ザ・超絶！ライオンハオー！)	Kento Shimoyama	July 12, 2015
21	"Burn! Ninja Baseball of Dreams"; Transliteration: "Moeyo! Yume no Ninja Yakyū" (Japanese: 燃えよ！夢の忍者野球)	Kento Shimoyama	July 19, 2015
22	"Super Combination! Haoh Shurikenzin"; Transliteration: "Chō Gattai! Haō Shurikenjin" (Japanese: 超合体！覇王シュリケンジン)	Kento Shimoyama	July 26, 2015
23	"It's Summer! Ninja Courage Test"; Transliteration: "Natsu da! Ninja Kimodameshi" (Japanese: 夏だ！忍者キモだめし)	Kento Shimoyama	August 2, 2015
24	"It's Summer! Western Yokai Arrive in Japan!"; Transliteration: "Natsu da! Seiyō Yōkai Zokuzoku Rainichi!" (Japanese: 夏だ！西洋妖怪ぞくぞく来日！)	Kento Shimoyama	August 9, 2015
25	"It's Summer! Beware of Dracula"; Transliteration: "Natsu da! Dorakyura ni Goyōjin" (Japanese: 夏だ！ドラキュラにご用心)	Nobuhiro Mouri	August 16, 2015
26	"It's Summer! Last Ninja Race Intermediate Announcement!"; Transliteration: "Natsu da! Rasuto Ninja Rēsu Chūkan Happyō!" (Japanese: 夏だ！ラストニンジャレース中間発表！)	Nobuhiro Mouri	August 23, 2015
27	"It's Summer! Chozetsu Star Is Born!"; Transliteration: "Natsu da! Chōzetsu Sutā Tanjō!" (Japanese: 夏だ！超絶スター誕生！)	Kento Shimoyama	August 30, 2015
28	"Run! Kibaoni Ninja Army"; Transliteration: "Gekisō! Kibaoni Ninja Gundan" (Japanese: 激走！牙鬼ニンジャ軍団)	Kento Shimoyama	September 6, 2015
29	"Ninja Sugoroku Definitive Edition!"; Transliteration: "Ninja Sugoroku Ketteiban!" (Japanese: 忍者すごろく決定版！)	Kento Shimoyama	September 13, 2015
30	"Targeted Ninja School!"; Transliteration: "Nerawareta Ninja Juku!" (Japanese: ねらわれた忍者塾！)	Kento Shimoyama	September 20, 2015
31	"The Runaway Ninja!"; Transliteration: "Ninja Tōsōchū!" (Japanese: ニンジャ逃走中！)	Kento Shimoyama	September 27, 2015
32	"Gekiatsu Ninja! Acha!"; Transliteration: "Gekiatsu Ninja! Achā!" (Japanese: ゲキアツ忍者！アチャー！)	Kento Shimoyama	October 4, 2015
33	"The Kunoichi That Loved Yakumo"; Transliteration: "Yakumo o Aishita Kunoichi" (Japanese: 八雲を愛したくノ一)	Nobuhiro Mouri	October 11, 2015
34	"The Legendary World Ninja Jiraiya Appears!"; Transliteration: "Densetsu no Sekai Ninja, Jiraiya Sanjō!" (Japanese: 伝説の世界忍者、ジライヤ参上！)	Kento Shimoyama	October 18, 2015
The Ninningers are fighting a group of Hyakkarage when a warrior named Jiraiya appears. Jiraiya is a legendary Ninja, 35th head of the Togakure School and central figure of the World Ninja War that occurred 27 years ago. He confused the Ninningers with evil Izayoi school ninjas and confronted them. Meanwhile, at the dojo, the Committee for the Protection of the Good Name of Ninjas was paying a visit. They intend to improve the image of ninjas through a very strict set of rules. However, it is revealed that transforming into a Ninninger actually goes against these terms. When the Advanced Yokai Konaki-jiji appears, the Igasaki ninjas intend to fight but the committee is on their heels
35	"Kinji Enters the Yokai Labyrinth!"; Transliteration: "Kinji, Yōkai e no Meiro!" (Japanese: キンジ、妖怪への迷路！)	Kento Shimoyama	October 25, 2015
36	"Kinji, the Glorious Superstar!"; Transliteration: "Kinji, Eikō no Sūpāsutā!" (Japanese: キンジ、栄光のスーパースター！)	Kento Shimoyama	November 8, 2015
37	"Shuriken Legend ~The Road to Last Ninja~"; Transliteration: "Shuriken Densetsu ~Rasuto Ninja e no Michi~" (Japanese: 手裏剣伝説～ラストニンジャへの道～)	Kento Shimoyama	November 15, 2015
38	"The Little Witch Loves Yakumo?"; Transliteration: "Majokko wa Yakumo ga Osuki?" (Japanese: 魔女っ子は八雲がお好き？)	Nobuhiro Mouri	November 22, 2015
39	"Kibaoni's Son Mangetsu Appears!"; Transliteration: "Kibaoni no Musuko, Mangetsu Arawaru!" (Japanese: 牙鬼の息子、萬月あらわる！)	Nobuhiro Mouri	November 29, 2015
40	"Look Out For Santa Claus!"; Transliteration: "Abunai Santa Kurōsu!" (Japanese: あぶないサンタクロース！)	Kento Shimoyama	December 6, 2015
41	"The Five Games of the Kibaoni Party!"; Transliteration: "Kibaoni Pātī, Go-ban Shōbu!" (Japanese: 牙鬼パーティー、五番勝負！)	Kento Shimoyama	December 13, 2015
42	"Otomonin Wars! The Nekomata Strikes Back"; Transliteration: "Otomonin Wōzu! Nekomata no Gyakushū" (Japanese: オトモ忍ウォーズ！ネコマタの逆襲)	Kento Shimoyama	December 20, 2015
43	"The Legendary Ninja! Yokai Karuta Tactics"; Transliteration: "Densetsu no Ninja! Yōkai Karuta Daisakusen" (Japanese: 伝説のニンジャ！妖怪かるた大作戦)	Nobuhiro Mouri	December 27, 2015
44	"The Final Battle! The Ordeals of the Last Ninja"; Transliteration: "Saishū Kessen! Rasuto Ninja no Shiren" (Japanese: 最終決戦！ラストニンジャの試練)	Kento Shimoyama	January 17, 2016
Gengetsu Kibaoni is finally revived, and Kyuemon assumes command of his father's army, sending Masakage to deal with the Ninningers. The ninjas accept the challenge from the enemy, but Yoshitaka orders Takaharu to stay behind and have a final bout against him. While the other Ninningers struggle against Masakage's illusions, Takaharu learns from his grandfather the tragic meaning of inheriting the title of "Last Ninja".
45	"Three Generations of Fathers and Sons! All Ninjas Gathered"; Transliteration: "Oyako Sansedai! Ninja Zen'in Shūgō" (Japanese: 親子三世代！ニンジャ全員集合)	Kento Shimoyama	January 24, 2016
With Masakage defeated, Kyuemon decides to confront the Ninningers himself, but the ninjas of the Igasaki Clan defeat him together, helping Tsumuji reclaim his lost Nintality in the process.
46	"The End Shuriken Awakens!"; Transliteration: "Owari no Shuriken, Mezameru!" (Japanese: 終わりの手裏剣、目覚める！)	Kento Shimoyama	January 31, 2016
The six Ninningers, along Yoshitaka and Tsumuji, fight together against Gengetsu's dreadful power, until Kyuemon cowardly strikes his former master and steals the Last Shuriken, which was the only thing that prevented his already dead spirit from leaving to the afterlife. Despite that, Takaharu and the others refuse to give up and are determined to fight to the end, despite their Shuriken Arts were sealed by the empowered Kyuemon.
47 (Final)	"To the Future Without Hiding, Heave-Ho!"; Transliteration: "Shinobazu Mirai e Wasshoi!" (Japanese: 忍ばず未来へワッショイ！)	Kento Shimoyama	February 7, 2016
By uniting their powers, the six Ninningers reclaim their lost Nintality and defeat Kyuemon to reclaim the Last Shuriken. Just as Takaharu manages to have Kyuemon recognize his errors, Gengetsu appears to absorb his son's essence and the ninjas steel themselves for the final battle against the Youkai Lord.
