= Illumitoon Entertainment =

American entertainment company

- Company type: Private
- Genre: Anime
- Founded: 2006
- Founder: Stephanie Giotes, Richard Ray, and Barry Watson
- Defunct: 2007; 19 years ago
- Fate: Defunct
- Headquarters: Fort Worth, Texas, United States
- Key people: Barry Watson President/CEO

Illumitoon Entertainment was a production company based in Fort Worth, Texas that specialized in anime. It was founded in January 2006 by former Funimation executives Stephanie Giotes, Richard Ray, and Barry Watson. Illumitoon's goal was to have its shows aired on television and offer unedited dual language DVDs.

== History ==
Illumitoon shared facilities with CRM Productions in Fort Worth, Texas and Westlake Entertainment was used for distribution. The company's first anime license was Beet the Vandel Buster and Beet the Vandel Buster Excellion. They also licensed AM Driver, B't X, and BT'X Neo. Illumitoon joined with Westlake for the licensing of Bobobo-bo Bo-bobo. Several Illumitoon releases had production issues including music being changed, the use of dubtitles (subtitles created from the dub script), and inoperable discs. Replacements with translated subtitles were offered for the first DVDs of Beet, Bobo, and B't X that were later found to be DVD-Rs. AM Driver and B't X were licensed by The Anime Network for VOD, but only 14 episodes of each series had a complete dub. After Westlake ceased distribution of their titles, future releases from Illumitoon were cancelled in late 2007.

== Post Illumitoon ==
AM Driver was never released on DVD and all series remained incomplete until S'more Entertainment relicensed Bobobo-bo Bo-bobo. This release also experienced issues due to the lack of subtitles. B't X was relicensed in 2016 by Anime Midstream.

== See also ==
- Funimation
- Westlake Entertainment
