= Ninku =

Japanese manga series by Kōji Kiriyama and its adaptations

- First tankōbon volume cover, featuring Fūsuke

忍空 (Ninkū)
- Genre: Adventure comedy; Fantasy; Martial arts
- Manga
- Written by: Kōji Kiriyama
- Published by: Shueisha
- Imprint: Jump Comics
- Magazine: Weekly Shōnen Jump
- Original run: June 14, 1993 – September 4, 1995
- Volumes: 9
- Anime film

Ninku: Tomb of Knives
- Directed by: Noriyuki Abe
- Written by: Hiroshi Hashimoto
- Music by: Yusuke Honma
- Studio: Studio Pierrot
- Released: November 2, 1994
- Runtime: 34 minutes
- Anime television series
- Directed by: Noriyuki Abe
- Produced by: Kenji Shimizu; Kouji Kaneda; Kyoutarou Kimura; Ken Hagino
- Written by: Hiroshi Hashimoto
- Music by: Yusuke Honma
- Studio: Studio Pierrot
- Original network: FNS (Fuji TV)
- English network: SEA: Animax Asia
- Original run: January 14, 1995 – February 24, 1996
- Episodes: 55
- Anime film

Ninku: The Movie
- Directed by: Noriyuki Abe
- Written by: Hiroshi Hashimoto
- Music by: Yusuke Honma
- Studio: Studio Pierrot
- Licensed by: NA: Media Blasters
- Released: July 15, 1995
- Runtime: 26 minutes
- Manga

Ninku: Second Stage – Story of Etonins
- Written by: Kōji Kiriyama
- Published by: Shueisha
- Imprint: Jump Comics
- Magazine: Ultra Jump
- Original run: September 17, 2005 – September 17, 2011
- Volumes: 12
- Anime television series

Naruto × Ninku
- Directed by: Noriyuki Abe
- Written by: Masaya Honda
- Music by: Yasuharu Takanashi; Yaiba; Yusuke Honma
- Studio: Pierrot Films
- icon

Ninku (Japanese: 忍空, Hepburn: Ninkū) is a Japanese manga series written and illustrated by Kōji Kiriyama. It was serialized in Shueisha's shōnen manga magazine Weekly Shōnen Jump from June 1993 to September 1995, with its chapters collected in nine tankōbon volumes. The story follows Fūsuke, a 12-year-old boy with extraordinary powers and the former captain of the Ninku Corps. The group specializes in a martial art that combines ninjutsu and kung fu. Fūsuke embarks on a journey to find other former Ninku captains and stop an enemy threat.

A 55-episode anime television series, produced by Fuji Television, Yomiko Advertising, and Studio Pierrot, aired on Fuji TV between January 1995 and February 1996. The anime features an original story with characters and elements from the source material. A sequel manga, titled Ninku: Second Stage – Story of Etonins, was serialized in Shueisha's seinen manga magazine Ultra Jump from September 2005 to September 2011, with its chapters collected in 12 tankōbon volumes.

The Ninku manga has had over 9 million copies in circulation.

== Plot ==
=== Manga ===
The series follows Fūsuke, a 12-year-old boy with an odd appearance who is a powerful warrior from the Ninku (忍空, Ninkū) school of martial arts. a style that mixes ninjutsu and kung fu. Before the present time in the story, an evil empire targeted the Ninku, prompting the formation of the Ninku Corps (忍空組, Ninkū-gumi) to combat the menace. The corps' names are taken from the twelve animals of the Chinese zodiac (Eto (干支)), and each captain is called a zodiac animal Ninku Master (Etonin (干支忍)). The Ninkus derive their powers from nature and a specific dragon associated with their element. The almighty master of all the elements is the Sky Dragon (天空龍, Tenkū Ryū). Before the end of the war, the Ninku were disbanded by their master. As a result, the empire was victorious, and the Ninku were vilified as the perpetrators of the war. The empire attempted to eliminate any surviving members. Three years later, Fūsuke—the young former captain of the First Ninku Corps, who controls wind—and his flatulent penguin companion, Hiroyuki, embark on a journey to find the other Ninku captains. However, a new group of Ninku users has arisen, trying to take over the world. Fūsuke and Hiroyuki must defeat the new Ninku empire with the help of their old comrades.

=== Anime ===
Fūsuke, the former captain of the First Division Ninku Corps, journeys across the land with his friend, the penguin Hiroyuki, and the hotheaded girl Rihoko, to find his mother, who was taken from him at a very young age by the Imperial Army leader, Kõchin. On his travels, he reunites with fellow captains Tōji (Rihoko's older brother) and Aichō, who begin to travel with him in hopes to not only stop the rise of the Imperial Army, but to restore respect to the Ninku students. Along the journey, Fūsuke and the others are tasked with finding and controlling the mystical Sky Dragon in order to become stronger.

== Characters ==
=== Main characters ===
Fūsuke (風助)
Voiced by: Rica Matsumoto (Japanese); Mona Marshall (film) (English)
Fūsuke the Wind (風の風助, Kaze no Fūsuke) is the former captain of the First Ninku Corps, the rat (Ne-nin (子忍)) Ninku. With the ability to control wind, Fūsuke searches for other former Ninku after a war with an evil empire.
Aichō (藍朓)
Voiced by: Mitsuaki Madono (Japanese); Stephen Apostolina (film) (English)
Aichō the Sky (空の藍朓, Sora no Aichō) is the former captain of the Tenth Ninku Corps, the rooster (Tori-nin (酉忍)) Ninku, and has extremely strong legs with an attitude to match, enabling him to cover large distances in a single bound and cause big damage on enemy machinery through his techniques. He also hates women, as evidenced by his attitude toward Tōji's sister, Rihoko, who has a crush on him. He also thinks Tōji is an idiot.
Tōji (橙次)
Voiced by: Jūrōta Kosugi (Japanese); Daran Norris (film) (English)
Tōji the Ground (大地の橙次, Daichi no Tōji) is the former captain of the Sixth Ninku Corps, the snake (Mi-nin (巳忍)) Ninku, specializing in ground attacks and techniques. He owns a personal plane that he calls the Hindenburg. As a recurring gag, the plane usually crash-lands. His technique enables him to transform the ground into a state resembling a tsunami, a high-level Ninku move.
Hiroyuki (ヒロユキ)
Voiced by: Katsumi Suzuki
Hiroyuki is Fūsuke's pet penguin. He possesses the ability to release explosive farts powerful enough to propel Fūsuke and itself. The stench is described as terrible and can knock others unconscious. Fūsuke considers him a friend and not a pet. He is supernaturally powerful.
Rihoko (里穂子)
Voiced by: Megumi Hayashibara (Japanese); Wendee Lee (film) (English)
Tōji's sister. She was unintentionally rescued by Fūsuke from fake Ninku and, at the time, he was unaware that she is Tōji's sister. She desperately wants to meet handsome men and immediately becomes infatuated with Aichō, but has little luck with him.

=== Imperial Army ===
Kōchin (コウチン)
Voiced by: Takashi Taniguchi
The High Priest of the Imperial Army and a master of feng shui. He is the spokesperson of the Emperor, and it was he who defeated the Ninku master in a direct duel, forcing the Ninku to disband. His ultimate goal is to control the power of the Sky Dragon, and for that purpose, he has captured Fūsuke's mother in order to draw the dragon out.
Kisumi (黄純)
Voiced by: Yasunori Matsumoto
A former Ninku captain who could command ice. After his fiancée was killed during the war, he headed out to attack the Imperial Army singlehandedly, but was captured and convinced to join them to prevent another war. He eventually reforms and helps Fūsuke and the others in their final confrontation.
Mekira (メキラ)
Voiced by: Akiko Hiramatsu
An illusionary technique expert. She was taken by Kōchin at a very young age, and her family was slaughtered by him. Only later does she learn this and turn against him.
Ajirada (アジラダ)
Voiced by: Tomomichi Nishimura
The sole heir of a martial art that uses electricity, channeled from arm guards, into his fists and feet. He later defects after being beaten by Fūsuke.

== Media ==
=== Manga ===
Written and illustrated by Kōji Kiriyama, Ninku started in Shueisha's shōnen manga magazine Weekly Shōnen Jump on June 14, 1993. The series was suspended on July 11, 1994, with 53 chapters published. It resumed publication as Ninku: Second Stage on December 5, 1994, and finished after 27 chapters on September 4, 1995. Shueisha collected the chapters in nine tankōbon volume, published from January 11, 1994, to November 2, 1995. Shueisha republished the manga in six bunkoban volumes from November 17, 2006, to February 16, 2007. A volume containing five stories of "First Stage", titled Ninku Zero: Ninku Tanpenshū (忍空 零 ―忍空短編集―; lit. 'Ninku Zero: A Collection of Ninku Short Stories'), was published by Shueisha on November 2, 2007.

A sequel, titled Ninku: Second Stage – Story of Etonins (忍空−SECOND STAGE 干支忍編−, Ninku Sekando Sutēji Etonin-hen), was serialized in Shueisha's seinen manga magazine Ultra Jump from September 17, 2005, to September 17, 2011. Shueisha collected its chapters in 12 tankōbon volumes, published from March 3, 2006, to November 4, 2011.

==== Ninku ====
No.	Release date	ISBN
1	January 11, 1994	4-08-871106-8
Chapters 1–8
2	March 4, 1994	4-08-871108-4
Chapters 9–18
3	May 2, 1994	4-08-871109-2
Chapters 19–27
4	August 4, 1994	4-08-871110-6
Chapters 28–37
5	August 4, 1994	4-08-871885-2
Chapters 38–46
6	February 3, 1995	4-08-871886-0
Chapters 47–53; Two extra chapters
7	April 4, 1995	4-08-871887-9
Second Stage: Chapters 1–8
8	August 4, 1995	4-08-871888-7
Second Stage: Chapters 9–17
9	November 2, 1995	4-08-871889-5
Second Stage: Chapters 18–27

==== Ninku: Second Stage – Story of Etonins ====
No.	Release date	ISBN
1	March 3, 2006	978-4-08-874118-5
Chapters 1–5
2	October 4, 2006	978-4-08-874259-5
Chapters 6–11
3	April 4, 2007	978-4-08-874350-9
Chapters 12–17
4	November 2, 2007	978-4-08-874439-1
Chapters 18–23
5	May 2, 2008	978-4-08-874529-9
Chapters 24–29
6	November 4, 2008	978-4-08-874556-5
Chapters 30–35
7	May 1, 2009	978-4-08-874673-9
Chapters 36–41
8	November 4, 2009	978-4-08-874759-0
Chapters 42–47
9	April 30, 2010	978-4-08-870061-8
Chapters 48–53
10	November 4, 2010	978-4-08-870140-0
Chapters 54–59
11	May 2, 2011	978-4-08-870231-5
Chapters 60–65
12	November 4, 2011	978-4-08-870309-1
Chapters 66–70; Extra chapter

=== Films ===
Prior to the anime television series, a film titled Ninku: Tomb of Knives (NINKU ナイフの墓標, Ninkū: Naifu no Bohyō) was screened at Jump Super Anime Tour in November 1994. A 26-minute film titled Ninku: The Movie (劇場版 NINKU -忍空-) was screened at the Toei Anime Fair on July 15, 1995.

Media Blasters's Anime Works brand released Ninku: The Movie with an English dub on VHS in 1998. It was later released on DVD, along with Yu Yu Hakusho: The Movie, on January 30, 2001, as a result of a poll conducted by Media Blasters.

=== Anime ===
Ninku was adapted into a 55-episode anime television series, produced by Fuji TV, Yomiko Advertising, and Studio Pierrot, and directed by Noriyuki Abe. It was broadcast on Fuji TV from January 14, 1995, to February 24, 1996. Although the series is based on the original manga, it features an original story, focusing primarily on the anime-only Imperial Army, while incorporating key characters and chapters from the manga at pivotal moments. The opening and ending theme songs were performed by Yume Suzuki. The opening theme is "Kagayaki wa Kimi no Nakani" (輝きは君の中に; lit. 'The Spark Is Within You'). The first ending theme is "Soredemo Ashita wa Yatte Kuru" (それでも明日はやってくる; lit. 'Still, Tomorrow Will Come') (episodes 1–28). The second ending theme is "Sora no Namae" (空の名前; lit. 'The Name of the Sky') (episodes 29–50). The third ending theme is "Sorezoreno Ashita e" (それぞれの明日へ; lit. 'Towards Everyone's Tomorrow') (episodes 51–55).

Geneon Entertainment released the series in two DVD box sets in Japan. The first set containing the initial 28 episodes was released on February 25, 2005, and the second set containing the remaining 27 episodes was released on March 21 of that same year. In 2015, Bandai Visual re-released the series in two Blu-ray box sets for its 20th anniversary: the first on May 21 and the second on July 15; the first box set included a drama CD featuring the returning main cast.

Ninku was also broadcast in other parts of Asia on Animax Asia.

In October 2026, it was announced that the series would receive a four-episode crossover anime series with Naruto, titled Naruto × Ninku. It will be animated by Pierrot Films and directed by Noriyuki Abe, with series composition by Masaya Honda, and Tetsuya Nishio, who worked on both the Ninku and Naruto anime series, will serve as character designer and chief animation director. Flow will perform the opening theme song "Go!!" and the ending theme song "Viva Rock" (ビバ★ロック, Biba Rokku) (Orange Range cover).

==== Episodes ====
No.	Title	Original release date
1	"Fūsuke the Rat!"; Transliteration: "Ne-nin no Fūsuke!" (Japanese: 子忍の風助！)	January 14, 1995
2	"Enter the Rooster Captain"; Transliteration: "Tori-nin Taichō Tōjō" (Japanese: 酉忍隊長登場)	January 21, 1995
3	"Tōji of the Land!"; Transliteration: "Daichi no Tōji!" (Japanese: 大地の橙次！)	January 28, 1995
4	"The Attackers"; Transliteration: "Shūgekisha-tachi" (Japanese: 襲撃者たち)	February 4, 1995
5	"The Victor's Smoke!"; Transliteration: "Kachimi-kemuri Tatsu!" (Japanese: 勝身煙たつ！)	February 11, 1995
6	"The Terrifying Castle Fortress"; Transliteration: "Kyōfu no Yōsaijō" (Japanese: 恐怖の要塞城)	February 18, 1995
7	"Kisumi of the Ice!"; Transliteration: "Kōri no Kisumi!" (Japanese: 氷の黄純！)	February 25, 1995
8	"The Sealed Heart"; Transliteration: "Tozasareta Kokoro" (Japanese: 閉ざされた心)	March 4, 1995
9	"Mother's Lullaby"; Transliteration: "Haha no Komoriuta" (Japanese: 母の子守唄)	March 11, 1995
10	"Sad Parting"; Transliteration: "Kanashī Wakare" (Japanese: 悲しい別れ)	March 18, 1995
11	"The Trial"; Transliteration: "Kuōkamimon no Shiren" (Japanese: 苦狼門の試練)	March 25, 1995
12	"The Way to Become Strong"; Transliteration: "Tsuyoku Naru Hōhō" (Japanese: 強くなる方法)	April 1, 1995
13	"A Distant Promise!"; Transliteration: "Tōi Yakusoku!" (Japanese: 遠い約束！)	April 8, 1995
14	"Overcoming the Pain"; Transliteration: "Itami o Koete" (Japanese: 痛みを越えて)	April 15, 1995
15	"True Courage"; Transliteration: "Hontō no Yūki!" (Japanese: 本当の勇気！)	April 22, 1995
16	"The Legendary Forest"; Transliteration: "Densetsu no Mori!" (Japanese: 伝説の森！)	April 29, 1995
17	"The Ninku Wolves Trap!"; Transliteration: "Ninkūrō no Wana!" (Japanese: 忍空狼の罠！)	May 6, 1995
18	"Desperation!!"; Transliteration: "Zettaizetsumei!!" (Japanese: 絶体絶命!!)	May 13, 1995
19	"The End of a Fierce Battle"; Transliteration: "Gekitō no Hate ni" (Japanese: 激闘の果てに)	May 20, 1995
20	"A Dolphin and a Boy"; Transliteration: "Iruka to Shōnen" (Japanese: イルカと少年)	May 27, 1995
21	"Hellish Cave"; Transliteration: "Jigoku no Dōkutsu" (Japanese: 地獄の洞くつ)	June 3, 1995
22	"The Terrifying Thunder Fist"; Transliteration: "Raimei Ken no Kyōfu" (Japanese: 雷鳴拳の恐怖)	June 10, 1995
23	"Sekirai of the Flame!"; Transliteration: "Honō no Sekirai!" (Japanese: 炎の赤雷！)	June 17, 1995
24	"Rebellion for Freedom"; Transliteration: "Jiyū e no Hanran" (Japanese: 自由への反乱)	June 24, 1995
25	"Father and Son!"; Transliteration: "Chichi to Ko!" (Japanese: 父と子！)	July 1, 1995
26	"Farewell Hiroyuki"; Transliteration: "Saraba Hiroyuki" (Japanese: さらばヒロユキ)	July 8, 1995
27	"The Feng Shui Valley!"; Transliteration: "Fūsui no Tani!" (Japanese: 風水の谷！)	July 15, 1995
28	"The Demonic Trio!"; Transliteration: "Ma no Sanjūshi!" (Japanese: 魔の三獣士！)	July 22, 1995
29	"The Sky Dragon Appears!"; Transliteration: "Tenkū Ryū Genru!" (Japanese: 天空龍現る！)	July 29, 1995
30	"The Shapeless Sniper"; Transliteration: "Sugata Naki Sogekisha" (Japanese: 姿なき狙撃者)	August 5, 1995
31	"Break Through the Barrier"; Transliteration: "Hōimō o Yabure" (Japanese: 包囲網を破れ)	August 12, 1995
32	"The Awakened Sekirai!!"; Transliteration: "Mezamero Sekirai!!" (Japanese: 目覚めろ赤雷!!)	August 19, 1995
33	"Prologue to Crisis"; Transliteration: "Kiki e no Joshō" (Japanese: 危機への序章)	August 26, 1995
34	"The Magic that Summons Death"; Transliteration: "Shi o Yobu Maboroshi!" (Japanese: 死を呼ぶ幻！)	September 2, 1995
35	"The Heroe of the Sky!"; Transliteration: "Ōzora no Yūsha!" (Japanese: 大空の勇者！)	September 9, 1995
36	"The Mysterious Boy"; Transliteration: "Nazo no Shōnen!!" (Japanese: 謎の少年!!)	September 16, 1995
37	"A Departing Promise"; Transliteration: "Wakare no Yakusoku" (Japanese: 別れの約束)	September 23, 1995
38	"The Cape of feng shui!" Transliteration: "Fūsui no Misaki!" (Japanese: 風水の岬！)	October 7, 1995
39	"The Crushed Ice!? The Sky Dragon Reappears"; Transliteration: "Kudaketa Kōri!? Tenkū Ryū Futatabi!!" (Japanese: 砕けた氷!?天空龍再び!!)	October 14, 1995
40	"Clash of Techniques! Fog vs Wind"; Transliteration: "Waza Gekitotsu Kiri Tsukai Tai Fū Tsukai" (Japanese: 技激突！霧使いVS風使い)	October 28, 1995
41	"Rihoko's Tears, Father's Hometown"; Transliteration: "Rihoko no Namida, Chichi no Omokage" (Japanese: 里穂子の涙・父のおもかげ)	November 4, 1995
42	"The Fist of Wrath! The Man who Slashes Ninku"; Transliteration: "Ikari no Ken! Ninkū Kiri no Otoko" (Japanese: 怒りの拳！忍空斬りの男)	November 11, 1995
43	"The Horror Building! The Mysterious Haunted House"; Transliteration: "Kyōfu no Yakata! Nazo no Yūrei Yashiki" (Japanese: 恐怖の館！謎の幽霊屋敷)	November 18, 1995
44	"A Clash!? Friendship with a Shuriken User"; Transliteration: "Taiketsu!? Shuriken Tsukai no Yūjō" (Japanese: 対決!?手裏剣使いの友情)	November 25, 1995
45	"Miss Ninku! Operation Breakthrough!"; Transliteration: "Misu Ninkū! Kenmon Toppa Sakusen!!" (Japanese: ミス忍空！検問突破作戦!!)	December 2, 1995
46	"Assassin of the Night! The Sealed Technique"; Transliteration: "Tsukiyo no Shikaku! Fūji Rareta Waza" (Japanese: 月夜の刺客！封じられた技)	December 9, 1995
47	"To the Capital! The Rebels of Justice"; Transliteration: "Shuto e! Seigi no Hanran-sha-tachi" (Japanese: 首都へ！正義の反乱者たち)	December 16, 1995
48	"Revived Memories! The Man who Kidnapped Mother"; Transliteration: "Yomigaeru Kioku! Haha o Saratta Otoko" (Japanese: 蘇る記憶！母をさらった男)	December 23, 1995
49	"The Unleashed Power! Time of the Decisive Battle"; Transliteration: "Tokihanata Reta Chikara! Kessen no Toki" (Japanese: 解き放たれた力！決戦の時)	January 13, 1996
50	"Transcend the Powers, Fūsuke! Maximum Air Power!!"; Transliteration: "Chikara o Koero Fūsuke! Saidai Kūryoku!!" (Japanese: 力を越えろ風助！最大空力!!)	January 20, 1996
51	"The Employed Bodyguard! Duel in the Evening"; Transliteration: "Yatoware Yōjinbō! Yūhi no Kettō" (Japanese: 雇われ用心棒！夕日の決闘)	January 27, 1996
52	"Defeating Fūsuke's Robbery! The Mystery of the Masked Man"; Transliteration: "Fūsuke no Gōtō Taiji! Kamen Otoko no Nazo" (Japanese: 風助の強盗退治！仮面男の謎)	February 3, 1996
53	"Stage of Friendship! Hiroyuki's Secret"; Transliteration: "Yūjō no Butai! Hiroyuki no Himitsu" (Japanese: 友情の舞台！ヒロユキの秘密)	February 10, 1996
54	"The Missing Wad of Bills!! Who is the Culprit?!"; Transliteration: "Kieta Satsutaba!! Warumono wa Dareda?!" (Japanese: 消えた札束!!悪者は誰だ?!)	February 17, 1996
55	"Fūsuke Becomes a Movie Star?!"; Transliteration: "Fūsuke, Eiga Sutā ni Naru?!" (Japanese: 風助、映画スターになる?!)	February 24, 1996

=== Video games ===
A number of video games based on the series have been released. Two video games were launched for the Game Boy, three video games for the Game Gear, a video game for the PlayStation, and a video game for the Sega Saturn. Fūsuke is also featured as a selectable character in the Weekly Shōnen Jump crossover fighting game Jump Ultimate Stars, launched for the Nintendo DS in November 2006. Characters from the series also appeared in another Weekly Shōnen Jump crossover smartphone game, titled Jumputi Heroes, released for iOS and Android in 2018.

== Reception and legacy ==
The Ninku manga has had over 9 million copies in circulation.

In a 2012 fan poll by BIGLOBE about the favorite Weekly Shōnen Jump anime adaptations, Ninku ranked 45th out of 50, and in a 2019 poll conducted by Goo Ranking of '"90s Anime That Deserve Remakes", it ranked 40th out of 60 series.

John Oppliger of AnimeNation attributed the low popularity of the Ninku anime series to its lack of a compelling narrative and the absence of lengthy, sequential story arcs that made other shōnen action series, such as Naruto, One Piece, and Bleach, appealing. While he praised the characters and the animation of the fight sequences, he found them repetitive and stated that the show does not encourage much viewer loyalty.

In a review for the Ninku/YuYu Hakusho Double Feature DVD release, Chris Beveridge from AnimeOnDVD praised Ninku: The Movie for its fight sequences and animation, but recommended this release only to fans of either series. In his review of Ninku: The Movie, Mike Toole of Anime Jump stated: "Aside from the engaging story and great fight scenes, there are a few other good points about Ninku."

Masashi Kishimoto, the creator of Naruto, was inspired by Ninku and used to copy Kiriyama's drawings while studying to become a manga artist. Kishimoto also declared that he created Naruto because he wanted to see the continuation of Ninku, adding that "if it were not for Ninku, Naruto would not exist."
