= Dragon Quest: The Adventure of Dai =

Japanese manga by Riku Sanjo and Koji Inada

- Cover of the first tankōbon volume, featuring Dai (front), Hadlar (back), Gome (bottom) and Brass (bottom right)

DRAGON QUEST –ダイの大冒険– (Doragon Kuesuto: Dai no Daibōken)
- Genre: Adventure; Fantasy
- Created by: Yuji Horii
- Manga
- Written by: Riku Sanjo
- Illustrated by: Koji Inada
- Published by: Shueisha
- English publisher: NA: Viz Media
- Imprint: Jump Comics
- Magazine: Weekly Shōnen Jump
- Original run: October 23, 1989 – December 9, 1996
- Volumes: 37
Further information
Anime film series
Directed by	Nobutaka Nishizawa (1, 3); Hiroki Shibata (2)
Produced by	Rikizou Kayano; Tomonori Imada
Written by	Junki Takegami
Music by	Koichi Sugiyama
Studio	Toei Animation
Released	July 20, 1991 – July 11, 1992
Runtime	35–45 minutes (each)
Films	3
Anime television series
Directed by	Nobutaka Nishizawa
Produced by	Hiroshi Inoue; Yoshio Takami; Atsushi Kido
Written by	Junki Takegami
Music by	Koichi Sugiyama
Studio	Toei Animation
Original network	JNN (TBS)
Original run	October 17, 1991 – September 24, 1992
Episodes	46
Manga
Yūsha Avan to Gokuen no Maō
Written by	Yūsaku Shibata
Published by	Shueisha
Imprint	Jump Comics
Magazine	V Jump
Original run	September 19, 2020 – present
Volumes	15
Manga
Xross Blade
Written by	Yoshikazu Amami
Published by	Shueisha
Imprint	Jump Comics
Magazine	Saikyō Jump
Original run	October 1, 2020 – January 4, 2024
Volumes	7
Anime television series
Directed by	Kazuya Karasawa
Produced by	Hatsuo Nara; Keisuke Naitō; Tetsuto Motoyasu
Written by	Katsuhiko Chiba
Music by	Yuki Hayashi
Studio	Toei Animation
Licensed by	NA: Toei Animation Inc.; SEA: Muse Communication
Original network	TXN (TV Tokyo)
Original run	October 3, 2020 – October 22, 2022
Episodes	100
- icon

Dragon Quest: The Adventure of Dai (Japanese: DRAGON QUEST –ダイの大冒険–, Hepburn: Doragon Kuesuto: Dai no Daibōken; lit. 'Dragon Quest: The Great Adventure of Dai') is a Japanese manga series written by Riku Sanjo and illustrated by Koji Inada, based on the popular video game franchise Dragon Quest. It was serialized in Shueisha's Weekly Shōnen Jump from October 1989 to December 1996, with its chapters collected in 37 tankōbon volumes.

A prequel manga series began in V Jump in September 2020 and a spin-off manga began in Saikyō Jump in October 2020. The manga was adapted into an anime series, produced by Toei Animation and broadcast on TBS from July 1991 to July 1992. It is the second anime adaptation based on the Dragon Quest franchise after Dragon Quest: Legend of the Hero Abel. The manga received a second 100-episode anime adaptation by Toei Animation, which was broadcast on TV Tokyo from October 2020 to October 2022.

The manga had over 50 million copies in circulation by 2022.

== Plot ==
The story begins with a young boy named Dai remembering a story told to him by his adoptive grandfather, the monster magician Brass, about the defeat of the Demon King Hadlar by the hero Avan. After Hadlar's defeat, all monsters are freed from his evil will, and peace prevails for ten years. Many monsters move to the island of Dermline to live in peace. Dai, an orphan and the only human on the island, is raised by Brass alongside his best friend, the monster Gome, and dreams of becoming a hero.

After Dai befriends Leona, princess of the Kingdom of Papnica, and saves her from danger, Avan arrives on the island with his apprentice, the magician Popp, to become Dai's teacher at Leona's request. The training is interrupted by the return of Hadlar, resurrected by the Great Demon King Vearn to serve as commander of his army. Avan sacrifices himself to protect his disciples, and Dai temporarily drives Hadlar away by awakening a mysterious power within himself.

To honor Avan's final request, Dai, Popp, and Gome leave the island to defeat Hadlar and his master. During their journey, they are joined by the healer and martial artist Maam, Hyunckel—a former subordinate of Hadlar—and Leona. Their enemies include the Beast King Crocodine, the Mystic Legion commander Zaboara and his son Zamza, the elemental Flazzard, the elusive Mystvearn (Hyunckel's teacher of black magic and a greater servant of Vearn), the jester and personal assassin Killvearn, and Baran, a legendary warrior and Dai's father who sides with Vearn after his wife's death and his son's disappearance.

Crocodine and Baran eventually reform and while Crocodine joins Dai's side to defeat Vearn, Baran refuses to cooperate and decides to fight Vearn alone. After a failed first attempt to defeat Vearn, with Baran losing his life to protect Dai in the process, Vearn's true objective is revealed: Destroying the surface world with six powerful bombs called "Black Cores" spread across the world in order to have only the underworld remain.

Dai and his party regroup and successfully infiltrate Vearn's fortress in order to defeat him and stop the Black Cores, also helped by Hadlar, who also reforms and sacrifices himself for Dai and the others to proceed. With his subordinates defeated, Vearn reclaims his original body, which was in MystVearn's custody and fights the party alone with all his might. After a vicious battle, Dai triumphs and destroys Vearn for good. Dai returns and is celebrated, but Killvearn reappears, revealing himself as a robot controlled by his minion Piroro and intending to detonate the black cores. Dai sacrifices himself to stop Piroro and save humanity. In the epilogue, Leona notes that the gem on Dai's sword (which is connected with his soul) still glows, indicating that Dai is still alive and will one day return.

== Production ==
After learning that it would take Yuji Horii three years to finish Dragon Quest IV, Weekly Shōnen Jump deputy editor-in-chief Kazuhiko Torishima had the idea to create both an original anime and original manga based on the video game franchise. When Horii could not do it himself, Torishima tapped Riku Sanjo to write the latter. Torishima would still have Horii supervise the manga to make sure it did not feel out of place in the Dragon Quest world. When the artist he originally planned to have illustrate the work turned it down, Torishima offered Koji Inada the job. Inada also initially turned it down as he was dead set on creating his own original series, but accepted when Torishima threatened to drop him if he passed on the job.

Although a one-shot, "Gush! Gulp!" (デルパ!イルイル!, Derupa! Iruiru!) was a two-part work, so Inada had to enlist help from his brothers and friends in order to finish it. The story reached between fifth and seventh place in the reader surveys and was followed by a three-part one-shot, "Dai o' Might!!!" (ダイ爆発!!!, Dai Bakuhatsu!!!). When this story reached number three in the rankings among popular series such as Dragon Ball, serialization was approved, and Dragon Quest: The Adventure of Dai began in Weekly Shōnen Jump in October 1989. Torishima left the project after reviewing the storyboards for the first three chapters.

Inada said Sanjo's scripts allowed him to put his own spin on things, which helped satisfy his desire to create his own original work to some degree. When Sanjo described the character Matoriv as "Torishima-like", Inada closely modeled him on their former editor because he was short on time. Inada said drawing The Adventure of Dai was tough, and he was always struggling to make his art a little "cooler". Commenting on how the final chapter hints at Dai's return, Inada suspects that Sanjo had ideas on how to continue the series if he was up to it. But Inada was burnt-out, explaining that he did not sleep three days out of every week in the latter-half of serialization.

An avid fan of the tokusatsu genre, Sanjo cited Gamera, Ultraseven, Kamen Rider V3, as well as Mobile Suit Gundam, Ashita no Joe, and various Weekly Shōnen Jump manga series as influences on The Adventure of Dai and Kamen Rider W (2009). The latter work has several concepts in common with The Adventure of Dai, including the protagonist-deuteragonist relationship.

== Media ==
=== Manga ===
Weekly Shōnen Jump No. 45 (October 1989) cover, the issue where Dragon Quest: The Adventure of Dai began its regular serialization

Dragon Quest: The Adventure of Dai is written by Riku Sanjo and illustrated by Koji Inada. A short story, titled "Gush! Gulp!", was first published for two chapters in Shueisha's Weekly Shōnen Jump in June 1989. Another short story, "Dai o' Might!!!", was published for three chapters in August 1989. Dragon Quest: The Adventure of Dai was serialized for seven years in Weekly Shōnen Jump from October 23, 1989, to December 9, 1996. The manga was collected into 37 tankōbon volumes published between March 9, 1990, and June 4, 1997. It was later released in 22 bunkoban volumes published from June 18, 2003, to March 18, 2004. A 25-volume edition that includes the color pages from its original magazine run and newly drawn covers by Inada was published between October 2, 2020, and July 2, 2021.

On July 9, 2021, Viz Media announced they licensed the series for English publication. The first volume was released on March 1, 2022.

A prequel manga series, titled Dragon Quest: The Adventure of Dai – Yūsha Avan to Gokuen no Maō (ドラゴンクエスト ダイの大冒険 勇者アバンと獄炎の魔王, Doragon Kuesuto: Dai no Daibōken Yūsha Avan to Gokuen no Maō) and illustrated by Yūsaku Shibata, with Sanjo credited for original work, began serializing in Shueisha's V Jump magazine on September 19, 2020. The series is centered around Avan before he met Dai and his companions. Its first part, the "Hero Arc", ended on July 20, 2024, and the second, the "Teacher Arc", began on November 21, 2024.

A spin-off manga written and illustrated by Yoshikazu Amami, titled Dragon Quest: The Adventure of Dai – Xross Blade, was serialized in Shueisha's Saikyō Jump magazine from October 1, 2020, to January 4, 2024, and collected in seven volumes. It is based on the October 2020 video game of the same name.

=== Anime ===
==== First series (1991) ====
Produced by Toei Animation, the anime adaptation of Dragon Quest: The Adventure of Dai aired for 46 episodes on TBS from October 17, 1991, to September 24, 1992. Despite no official Japanese DVD release, the show reran in 2007 on Toei's channel with a new master. The series uses two pieces of theme music, both composed by Koichi Sugiyama and performed by Jirō Dan. "Yuusha yo Isoge!!" is used for the opening theme, while "My Road, My Journey", which was the original ending theme for Dragon Quest II, is used for the episodes' ending theme. The series adapts the events of the first ten volumes of the manga, with initial plans to continue onward until scheduling and time slot changes at TBS lead to the series ending after 46 episodes. To accommodate the abrupt ending, Sanjo helped to provide an adjusted finale to the anime.

On January 6, 2020, the whole series was released in Japan for distribution on several video on demand (VOD) services, the first time the series has become officially available after the VHS release of the 1990s. In March 2020 it was announced that the 1991 anime will be getting a Blu-ray box for the first time, released on July 3, 2020. The set contained all 46 episodes, and the three Toei Anime Fair short theatrical films (including the first film never before released on home video), which have been scanned from their original 35 mm negatives with high resolution and recorded as high-quality full HD remastered images.

==== Films ====
Three short theatrical films were produced based on the first TV series, all of which premiered at the Toei Anime Fair film festival.

No.	Title	Original release date
1	"The Great Adventure of Dai 1"; Transliteration: "Doragon Kuesuto: Dai no Daibōken" (Japanese: ドラゴンクエスト ダイの大冒険)	July 20, 1991
2	"The Great Adventure of Dai 2: Avan's Disciples"; Transliteration: "Doragon Kuesuto: Dai no Daibōken Tachiagare!! Aban no Shito" (Japanese: ドラゴンクエスト ダイの大冒険 起ちあがれ!!アバンの使徒)	March 7, 1992
3	"The Great Adventure of Dai 3: Six Great Generals"; Transliteration: "Doragon Kuesuto: Dai no Daibōken Buchi Yabure!! Shinsei Roku Daishōgun" (Japanese: ドラゴンクエスト ダイの大冒険 ぶちやぶれ!!新生6大将軍)	July 11, 1992

==== Second series (2020) ====
It was announced during Jump Festa 2020 that there would be a new anime adaptation that would premiere in fall 2020. The anime was produced by Toei Animation and was a hybrid of 2D and CG animation. The series ran for 100 episodes, premiering on TV Tokyo and other affiliates on October 3, 2020. The series halted broadcast since March 12, 2022, when episode 73 was originally scheduled to air, and the series' entire schedule was subsequently delayed until further notice shortly after Toei Animation revealed their internal servers had been hacked by an unauthorized third party. The broadcast resumed on April 16, 2022, and finished on October 22 of the same year. The band Macaroni Empitsu performed the series' opening theme "Ikiru o Suru" and the series' first ending theme "mother". XIIX performed the series' second ending theme "Akashi".

Muse Communication licensed the second series in Asia-Pacific, and streamed the first 50 episodes on Netflix in 2022 and also later streamed on Muse Asia YouTube channel for a limited time in 2023. Toei Animation simulcasted the series with English subtitles in North America, New Zealand, Africa, and Europe via Crunchyroll, as well as Hulu in the United States. An English dub was produced by Toei Animation Inc. and Ocean Media. It was initially the subject of a do-no-work notice issued by the American actor's union SAG-AFTRA. The first 25 episodes began streaming in the United Kingdom on BBC's iPlayer on September 26, 2022. In North America, the first 50 dubbed episodes were made available on a variety of download to own platforms beginning November 8, 2022. The entire series began streaming in the United States on Hulu on July 1, 2023.

=== Video games ===
During Jump Festa '20, a video game based on the series has been announced.

Dragon Quest: The Adventure of Dai – Xross Blade, an arcade game with collectible trading cards, was released in Japanese arcades on October 22, 2020, and closed on March 31, 2024.

Dragon Quest: The Adventure of Dai – A Hero's Bonds, a smartphone RPG for iOS/Android, was released worldwide on September 28, 2021, and was closed on April 26, 2023.

Infinity Strash: Dragon Quest – The Adventure of Dai, an action RPG for PlayStation 5, PlayStation 4, Xbox Series X/S, Nintendo Switch and PC via Steam, was released worldwide on September 28, 2023.

Dai appears as a playable character in the 2019 video game Jump Force, marking the first appearance of a Dragon Quest character in a Weekly Shōnen Jump crossover game.

== Reception ==
Dragon Quest: The Adventure of Dai is one of Weekly Shōnen Jump's best-selling manga series of all time, with over 50 million copies in circulation by 2022. On TV Asahi's Manga Sōsenkyo 2021 poll, in which 150,000 people voted for their top 100 manga series, Dragon Quest: The Adventure of Dai ranked 30th.

Grant Jones of Anime News Network described The Adventure of Dai as being in the classic shōnen mold; "a soft bubbly tale for a younger audience that is neither too complicated nor thought-provoking". Although noting this could make the manga predictable, he found the first volume to contain plenty of subtle but meaningful changes that "spice up" the formula. Jones praised Inada's ability to reproduce the art style and comedic timing of Akira Toriyama, the character and monster designer of the original Dragon Quest video games and long-time contributor to Weekly Shōnen Jump, and found the story reminiscent of Toriyama's own Dragon Ball manga.
