= Koji Kakamu =

Japanese judo coach

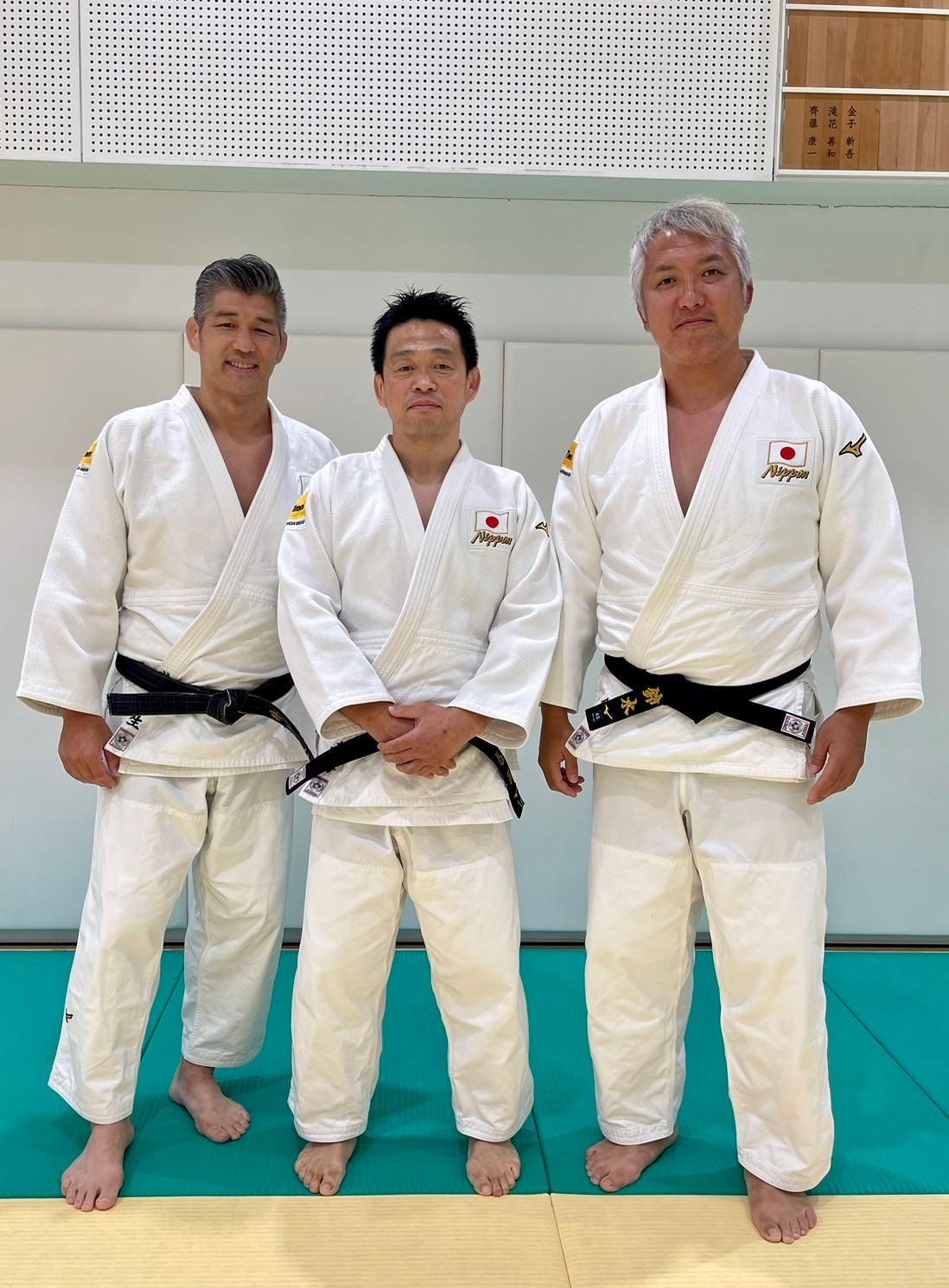
- Born: June 7, 1977 (age 48); Japan
- Nationality: Japanese
- Style: Judo
- Team: Saudi Arabia (Head Coach)

Other information
- Occupation: Judo coach, former Judoka

Koji Kakamu (各務 耕司 (Kakamu Kōji, born June 7, 1977)) is a Japanese judo coach and former judoka. He is the current head coach of the Saudi Arabia national judo team.

He is notable for his successful tenure as a coach for the All Japan Judo Federation (AJJF), particularly as the head coach for the junior national team, leading them to numerous gold medals at the World Judo Juniors Championships.

== Career ==
=== As an athlete ===
Kakamu began judo in elementary school. He attended Tenri High School and later Doshisha University. After graduation, he joined the Aichi Prefectural Police judo team and achieved 3rd place in the All Japan Police Judo Championships. During his career as an athlete, he also participated in several international competitions.

=== As a coach ===
==== Japan (AJJF) ====
After retiring as an athlete, Kakamu served as a coach and later head coach for the Aichi Prefectural Police team.

He also served as a coach for the All Japan Judo Federation (AJJF). He was significantly involved in the development of junior athletes, serving as a junior coach and later as the head coach for the Japanese junior national team. Under his leadership, the Japanese team achieved outstanding results at the World Judo Juniors Championships:

2019 World Juniors (Marrakesh): (As junior coach) Team won 2 individual gold medals and the mixed team gold.

2022 World Juniors (Guayaquil): (As junior head coach) Team won 3 individual gold medals and the mixed team gold.

2023 World Juniors (Odivelas): (As junior head coach) Team won 5 individual gold medals and the mixed team gold.

2024 World Juniors (Dushanbe): (As junior head coach) Team won 4 individual gold medals and the mixed team gold.

==== Saudi Arabia ====
In January 2025, Kakamu resigned from the Aichi Prefectural Police and was appointed as the head coach of the Saudi Arabia national judo team, under the Saudi Olympic Committee.
