= Beet the Vandel Buster =

Japanese manga series

- First tankōbon volume cover, featuring Beet

冒険王ビィト (Bōken Ō Bīto)
- Genre: Adventure, fantasy
- Manga
- Written by: Riku Sanjo
- Illustrated by: Koji Inada
- Published by: Shueisha
- English publisher: NA: Viz Media
- Imprint: Jump Comics
- Magazine: Monthly Shōnen Jump (2002–2006); Jump SQ.Crown (2016); Jump SQ.Rise (2018–present)
- Original run: March 6, 2002 – present
- Volumes: 19
- Anime television series
- Directed by: Tatsuya Nagamine
- Written by: Yoshimi Narita
- Music by: Hiroshi Takaki
- Studio: Toei Animation
- Licensed by: NA: Illumitoon Entertainment
- Original network: TXN (TV Tokyo)
- Original run: September 30, 2004 – March 30, 2006
- Episodes: 77
- icon

Beet the Vandel Buster (Japanese: 冒険王ビィト, Hepburn: Bōken Ō Bīto; lit. 'Adventure King Beet') is a Japanese manga series written by Riku Sanjo and illustrated by Koji Inada. The manga ran in Shueisha's Monthly Shōnen Jump from 2002 to 2006. After a nearly ten-year hiatus, the series resumed in Jump SQ.Crown in 2016, before entering a short-term hiatus. It has been serialized in Jump SQ.Rise since 2018. 19 volumes tankōbon volumes have been released as of January 2026. In North America, Viz Media licensed the manga for English release and published its first twelve volumes between 2004 and 2007.

The series takes place in a fantasy world where humans have been suffering from the attacks of the demon-like Vandels. Humans can fight back by becoming a Vandel Buster, a paid monster and Vandel assassin. Beet is a young boy who becomes a Vandel Buster to be like his heroes, the Zenon Warriors.

A 52-episode anime television series adaptation by Toei Animation was broadcast on TV Tokyo, followed by a sequel, Beet the Vandel Buster: Excellion, which ran for 25 episodes. The anime series was licensed in North America by Illumitoon Entertainment, who only released one DVD in 2007 before discontinuing it.

== Story ==
Set in the Dark Ages, a term referring to the time since Vandels (a portmanteau of "vampire and "devil") appeared and started attacking humans. Beet is a boy who dreams of joining the "Zenon Warriors", a group of "Vandel Busters" who are considered to be the strongest on the continent. When the group comes to protect his village from the Vandel, Beltorze, Beet tries to join them but is rejected. When Beltorze appears, the Zenon Warriors seem to have the upper hand until Beet cheers them on, causing the Vandel to notice his presence. Beltorze attacks Beet, and the Zenon Warriors are forced to break formation to help him. Beltorze uses that moment to attack again, which mortally wounds all of them. Hidden in the smoke, the Zenon Warriors decide to rescue Beet's life by putting their life force into their "Saiga" and giving them to Beet. When Beet complains and asks them why they are doing this, it is revealed that Zenon is Beet's brother. The now weaponless Zenon Warriors then emerge from the smoke and continue to attack Beltorze. When Beet regains consciousness, both Beltorze and the Zenon Warriors are gone. Guilt-ridden and sad, he cries and vows to destroy all the Vandels and end the Dark Ages. He then goes on a three-year training expedition. His childhood friend, Poala, later joins Beet and they form the "Beet Warriors". As Beet continues his journey, more is learned about the fight between the Zenon Warriors and Beltorze and the fantasy world of Beet is expanded on.

== Media ==
=== Manga ===
Written by Riku Sanjo and illustrated by Koji Inada, Beet the Vandel Buster was first serialized in Shueisha's shōnen manga magazine Monthly Shōnen Jump from March 6, 2002, (Note: It debuted in the April 2002 issue, released on March 6 of that same year.) to July 6, 2006. (Note: Its last chapter in the magazine was published in its August 2006 issue, released on July 6 of that same year.) After a nearly ten-year hiatus, the series resumed publication in Jump SQ.Crown on April 15, 2016; however, it went on hiatus on October 14 of that same year. Jump SQ.Crown ceased publication in January 2018 and the series resumed publication in the inaugural issue of Jump SQ.Rise on April 16, 2018. Shueisha has collected its chapters into individual tankōbon volumes. The first volume was released on October 4, 2002. As of January 5, 2026, 19 volumes have been released.

In North America, the manga was licensed for English release by Viz Media, who released its first twelve volumes from October 19, 2004, to October 2, 2007.

=== Anime ===
Beet the Vandel Buster was adapted into a 52-episode anime television series by Toei Animation, which was broadcast on TV Tokyo from September 30, 2004, to September 29, 2005. It was followed by Beet the Vandel Buster: Excellion (冒険王ビィト エクセリオン, Bōken Ō Bīto Ekuserion), which ran for 25 episodes from October 6, 2005, to March 30, 2006.

In North America, both series were licensed by Illumitoon Entertainment in 2006; however, they only released one DVD of the first series in 2007 and discontinued it.

== Reception ==
By April 2018, the first 13 volumes of the manga had 4 million copies in print.
