= Koji Okubo =

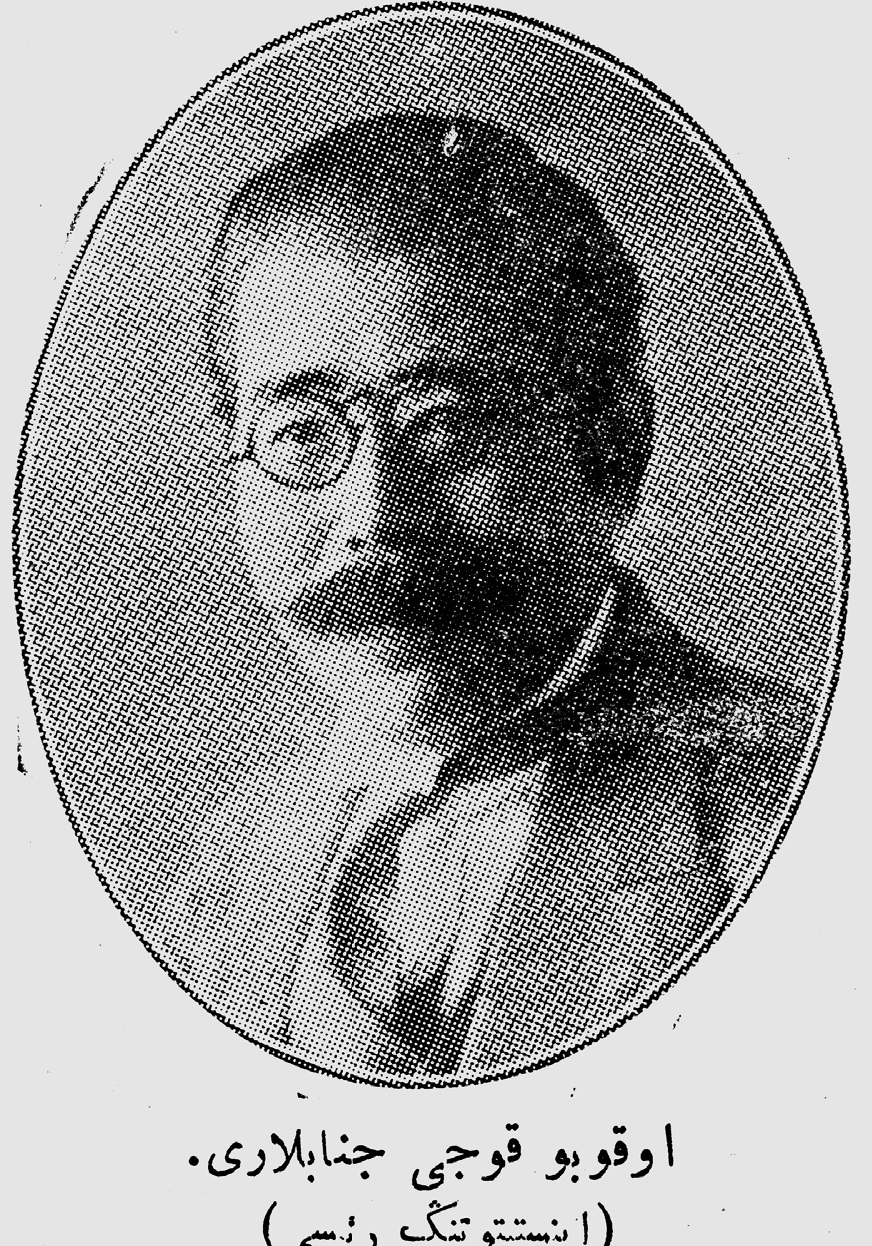
- Born: 1887; Hyōgo, Japan
- Died: 1950 (aged 62–63); Tokyo, Japan
- Other name: 大久保幸次
- Occupations: Islamic studies and turkology

Koji Okubo (大久保 幸次, Koji Okubo; 1887–1950) was a Japanese orientalist. He was known as the first turkologist in Japan.

== Biography ==
Koji Okubo was born in 1887 in Hyōgo Prefecture, Japan.

In 1910, he entered the German Language Department at the Tokyo School of Foreign Languages, and after graduating, he became a student in the special course of the Oriental History Department at the same school. Along with publishing and translating from German, in 1915, while studying Islam, he began translating the Quran into Japanese and the tales of Nasreddin Hodja.

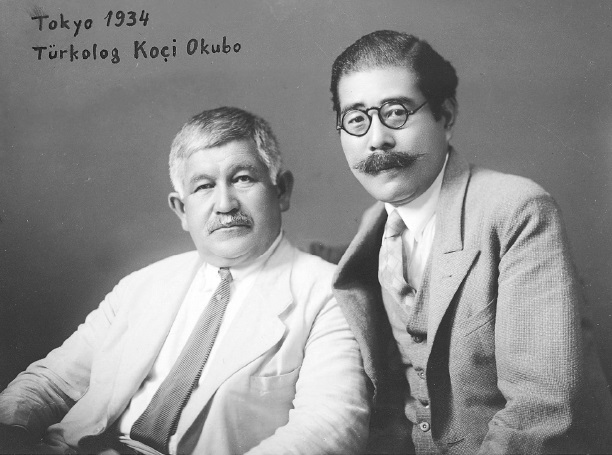
Gayaz Iskhaki with the Japanese Turkologist Kochi Okubo. Tokyo, 1934

In 1923 he became a lecturer at Sotoshu University. It was then that he developed an interest in the history and culture of the Turkic peoples. This was largely influenced by the formation of the Turkish Republic from the remnants of the former Ottoman Empire, as well as the arrival of migrants from the Ural-Volga region in Japan during the Russian Civil War. Then he began writing a collection of articles The «Turkic-Tatar Language in Manchuria», which argued that the Turkic language was one of the languages of international communication in Manchuria, largely because Turkic tribes had long spread the influence of their language through their westward migration, and also used it to compile codes and laws for a number of Muslim countries at the time. He acted as an intermediary between Japanese society and the Turkic-Tatar immigrants in Harbin and other Muslim parts of Japan.

He participated in the opening ceremony of Kobe Mosque in 1935, also known as the first mosque in Japan, and wrote an introductory article about the mosque for his collection on the occasion. A year later, he was sent to Turkey by the Japan-Turkey Relations Association to attend the third congress of the Turkish Language Association and to have an audience with Mustafa Kemal Atatürk, becoming the first Japanese individual to be granted such an audience.

In 1937 he founded the Islamic Culture Association.

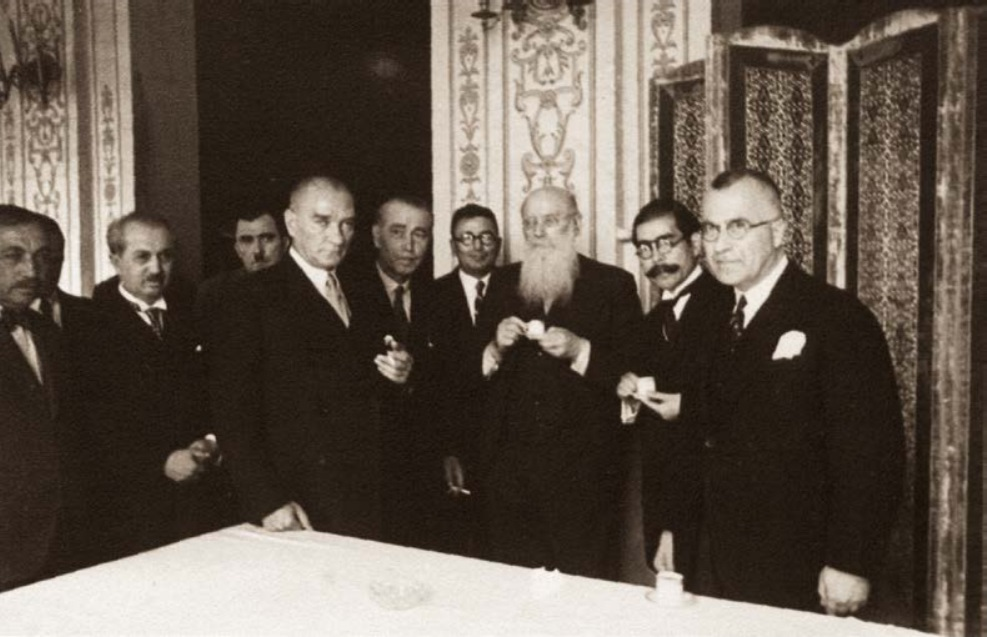
Talking to Turkish and foreign scholars. Dolmabahçe Palace, İstanbul, 24–31 August 1936.

In 1939 he established the Department of Islamic Cultural History at Waseda University, and later introduced the history of Islam into the curriculum at the University of Tokyo. Until 1949, he taught the fundamentals of Islamic culture at several universities in Japan. His scholarly work is known to have been closely intertwined with pan-Asianism and the Japanese Empire's policy toward the Muslim world, directed against Western and Soviet influence. This was one of the reasons for the dissolution of his organization on 15 October 1945, as well as his removal from teaching and publishing, which subsequently led to his financial dire straits. However, thanks to the help of Tatar-Bashkir emigrants, Okubo was able to purchase a new home and then find a new job.

He died in 1950.

== Works ==
- Islam (Japanese: イスラム教). Tokyo: Iwanami Shoten, 1934.
- Tribes of Western Asia (Japanese: 西アジア諸族). Tokyo: Iwanami Shoten, 1935.
- The Great Straits (Japanese: 現代海峡圏). Tokyo, 1936 (with Hajime Kobayashi).
- The Modern Islamic Sphere (Japanese: 現代囘教圏). Tokyo: Shikai Shobō, 1936 (with Hajime Kobayashi).
- Concerning Islam (Japanese: 回教に就いて). Tokyo: Japan Cultural Association, 1938.
- Keywords of the Islamic World (Japanese: 回教圏要圖). Tokyo, 1940.
- Concerning the Ethnic Composition of Central Asia (Japanese: 中央アジアノ民族構成ニ付テ). Tokyo: China Problems Research Association, 1942.
- Religious Situation and Related Questions in the South (Japanese: 南方宗教事情とその諸問題). Tokyo: Greater Japan Buddhist Association, 1942 (co-author).
- The Great East Asian War and the Islamic Question (Japanese: 大東亞戰と回教問題). Tokyo: Satsukikai, Showa 17, 1942.
- Study of the Koran (Japanese: コーラン研究). Tokyo: Daojiang Academy, 1950 (with Hiroyuki Kagishima).
- World Religions (Japanese: 世界の宗教). Tokyo: Sanseido, 1954.
