= Kōji Tanami =

Japanese banker (born 1939)

Kōji Tanami (田波耕治, Tanami Kōji; born September 10, 1939, Tokyo) is the Governor of the Japan Bank for International Cooperation. He is a candidate to become the Governor of the Bank of Japan.
