= Koji Orita =

Koji Orita (織田紘二, Orita Kōji, born March 1, 1945) is a Japanese performing arts producer, director, playwright, and author. He spent 43 years at the National Theatre of Japan (now the Japan Arts Council), primarily involved in the production and direction of kabuki. In 2006, he was appointed director of the Japan Arts Council.

== Early life and education ==
Orita was born in Oiwake village (now Abira), Hokkaido, Japan. After graduating from a local high school, he enrolled at Kokugakuin University in 1963, studying Japanese literature. At Kokugakuin, he studied under scholars including Nishitsunoi Masayoshi, Takasaki Masahide, Okano Hirohiko, and Misumi Haruo.

In 1964, Orita attended a kabuki performance at the Kabuki-za for the first time and was profoundly moved by the experience. He subsequently revived the dormant Kabuki Research Society at Kokugakuin University. In 1966, while organizing the society's second anniversary event, he contacted Yukio Mishima by telephone to request a congratulatory message, which Mishima provided verbally.

His graduation thesis, The Genealogy of Performing Groups: A Study of Monkey Performance (Geinin Buraku no Keifu: Sarumawashi no Kenkyū), was a 700-page work that systematically examined the history of sarumawashi (monkey performance) from its origins to the modern era. It received high praise from Misumi Haruo, and an abridged version was published in the academic journal Geinō of the Society for Performing Arts Studies.

== Career at the National Theatre ==
In April 1967, Orita joined the National Theatre of Japan, which had opened in October 1966, on the recommendation of Gunji Masakatsu, a professor at Waseda University. He was assigned to the kabuki production division and also worked in the performance division covering bunraku, dance, traditional music, gagaku, shōmyō, and folk performing arts.

=== Association with Yukio Mishima ===
In 1969, Orita served as production assistant for Yukio Mishima's new kabuki play Chinsetsu Yumiharizuki at the National Theatre, a work that Mishima wrote and directed. Through this production, Orita developed a close personal and professional relationship with Mishima that lasted until shortly before the author's death.

According to Orita's published account, he served as Mishima's production assistant from April to November 1969 during the Chinsetsu Yumiharizuki run. After the production, their relationship continued in both an official capacity — as Mishima served as a non-executive director of the National Theatre while Orita was a staff member — and on a personal basis, as Mishima had taken a liking to the younger Orita. Two days before Mishima's suicide on November 25, 1970, Mishima personally handed Orita a revised manuscript (with red-ink corrections) for a bunraku adaptation of Chinsetsu Yumiharizuki.

=== Major productions ===
Orita produced and directed numerous kabuki productions at the National Theatre over four decades. Notable productions include:

- 1986: For the National Theatre's 20th anniversary, he produced a three-month run of the complete Kanadehon Chūshingura, mobilizing leading kabuki actors of the era.
- 1996: For the 30th anniversary, he produced and directed Shitennō Momiji no Edoguma, a recreation of the Edo-period kaomise (face-showing) tradition, performed as an all-day program by the Ichikawa Ennosuke troupe.
- 1997: He produced the complete Dannoura Kabuto Gunki, in which the role of Akoya was passed from Nakamura Utaemon VI to Bandō Tamasaburō V in a notable act of artistic succession.
- 2006: For the 40th anniversary, he produced, adapted, and directed Genroku Chūshingura by Mayama Seika, presenting for the first time the complete cycle of plays in chronological order over three months.

=== International performances ===
Orita also directed and organized kabuki performances abroad. In 1991, as part of the Japan Festival in the United Kingdom and Ireland, he wrote and directed Hamuretto Yamatono Nishikie, a kabuki adaptation of Hamlet. In 1994, he organized the Japan–Austria 125th anniversary of diplomatic relations performances, presenting Shunkan in kabuki, bunraku, and Noh formats across Vienna, Warsaw, Prague, and London.

== Contributions to Okinawan performing arts ==
Orita directed and supervised numerous productions of Ryukyuan dance and Kumiodori (Okinawan traditional musical drama), contributing to the training of performers in Okinawan traditional arts.

== Selected publications ==
- Kabuki Monogatari (歌舞伎モノがたり). Tankosha, 1998.
- Gei to Hito: Sengo Kabuki no Meiyū-tachi (芸と人 戦後歌舞伎の名優たち, Art and the Artist: Great Kabuki Actors of the Postwar Era). Engeki Shuppansha, 2011.
- Shibai Nikki: Mishima Yukio (芝居日記 三島由紀夫, Theatre Diary: Yukio Mishima). Chuo Koronsha, 1991. (editor)
- Shorokugeibanashi (松緑芸話, Shoroku Talks on Art). Kodansha, 1989. (transcriber)

== Awards ==
- 1998: Japan Drama Association Award
- 2024: 7th JTS Yamamoto Hōzan Memorial Award
