= Koji Sakui =

Koji Sakui from the Micron Japan, Ltd.- Tokyo Office, Minato-Ku, Tokyo, Japan was named Fellow of the Institute of Electrical and Electronics Engineers (IEEE) in 2012 for the contribution to NAND flash memories.

== Personal life ==
Sakui Koji was born in Tokyo, Japan in 1956. He received his Bachelor and Master in Engineering from Keio University. He received his Doctorate in Engineering from Tohoku University under the guidance of Prof. Fujio Masuoka in 1995.
