= Koji Seita =

Japanese footballer

Personal information
- Date of birth: 9 September 1980 (age 46)
- Place of birth: Kanagawa, Japan
- Height: 1.80 m (5 ft 11 in)
- Position: Midfielder

Youth career
- Shonandai HS

Senior career*
Years	Team	Apps	(Gls)
1999–2003	Español S.D.		
2003	Deportivo Italchaco	4	(0)
- Almeira
2004–2005	Valdevez	14	(1)
- * Club domestic league appearances and goals

Koji Seita (清田孝司, Seita Koji; born 9 September 1980) is a former Japanese footballer.

== Club career ==
Seita played for Spanish side Español Sociedad Deportiva from 1999 until 2003. In 2003, he went on trial with professional side Racing de Ferrol.

Seita became the first Asian footballer in Venezuela when he joined Primera División side Deportivo Italchaco in 2003. He later joined Portuguese side Valdevez from Almeira.

== Career statistics ==
=== Club ===
Club	Season	League			National Cup		League Cup		Other		Total	
Club	Season	Division	Apps	Goals	Apps	Goals	Apps	Goals	Apps	Goals	Apps	Goals
Deportivo Italchaco	2003–04	Venezuelan Primera División	4	0	0	0	–		0	0	4	0
Valdevez	2004–05	Segunda Divisão	14	1	1 (Note: Appearances in the Taça de Portugal)	0	–		0	0	15	1
Career total			18	1	1	0	0	0	0	0	19	1
