= Koji Ohmura =

Special Makeup Effects Artist

- Born: June 1, 1981 (age 44); Morioka, Japan
- Occupation: Special make-up effects artist
- Years active: 2004–present
- Website: kojiohmura.com

Koji Ohmura (born June 1, 1981, in Morioka) is a Japanese Special make-up effects artist. He won the Emmy Award for Outstanding Special Effects Costumes, Hair and Makeup for Disney Plus's The Quest.

He was also nominated for Make-up Artists & Hair Stylists Guild Awards for Best Make-up for Commercials and Music Videos for Katy Perry's "Swish Swish" (2018), Justin Timberlake's "Supplies" (2019) and The Weeknd's "In Your Eyes" (2021).

His work includes Aliens vs. Predator: Requiem, The Butler, CSI: Crime Scene Investigation, Resident Evil: The Final Chapter, The Big Bang Theory, and Hawaii Five-0.
