= Koji Kishio =

Japanese scientist

Kohji Kishio (岸尾 光二, Kishio Kōji; born April, 1951) is a Japanese scientist. He retired from the University of Tokyo in March 2017 and is now Emeritus Professor of UT. His major research fields are Solid State Chemistry, Materials Science and Superconducting Materials Engineering. He is a Fellow of the Japan Society of Applied Physics.

== Biography ==
He was born in Nagoya City on April 14, 1951. In 1970, he graduated from Asahigaoka High School in Nagoya. Four years later, he graduated from Department of Industrial Chemistry at the University of Tokyo, from which he also obtained a Master of Engineering degree from Department of Industrial Chemistry in 1976. He then entered the graduate school of Northwestern University, where he worked as a research assistant at the Department of Materials Science and Engineering.

He received his PhD from Northwestern in 1981 and returned to Japan, becoming associate professor in the University of Tokyo's School of Engineering in 1990. He was a visiting associate professor at Kyoto University's Institute of Chemical Research from 1993 until 1995.

In 1996, he became professor at the Department of Superconductivity Engineering. The department later joined into the Department of Applied Chemistry and he continued to be a full professor. During the 2001-2003 period, he was Vice Chairman, International Exchange and Program Committee of UT, after which (through 2005), he was Director at the Cryogenic Research Center of UT.

In 2017, he retired from UT and the title of Emeritus Professor was awarded.

== Academic affiliations ==
- 2008-2009 Electrochemical Society of Japan, Vice President.
- 2007-2008 Applied Physical Society of Japan, Executive Director.
- 2008-2009 Cryogenic Society of Japan, Board of Directors Member.
- Chemical Society of Japan, Physical Society of Japan, Ceramic Society of Japan, Society of Non-Traditional Technology
- Materials Research Society, American Physical Society, Electrochemical Society
- 2002-2004 Tonen International Scholarship Foundation, Councilor.
- 2004 to present Tonen International Scholarship Foundation, Trustee.
- 2015-2017 Athletic Foundation of the University of Tokyo, Director
- 2004-2017 Tokyo Big-6 League University Cheering Party Association, Director

== Awards ==
- 1994 Nissan Science Award (2nd Annual, Nissan Global Foundation)
- 1999 Superconductivity Science and Technology Award (3rd Annual, Society of Non-traditional Technology, Japan)
- 2011 Fellow (Applied Physical Society of Japan)
