= Koji Miyakawa =

Member of the Supreme Court of Japan

Koji Miyakawa (宮川 光治, Miyakawa Kōji) born February 28, 1942 is a former member of the Supreme Court of Japan.
