= Kōji Kiriyama =

Japanese manga artist

Koji Kiriyama 桐山 光侍
- Area: Manga artist
- Notable works: Ninku

Kōji Kiriyama (桐山 光侍, Kiriyama Kōji) is a Japanese manga artist, best known for the Ninku series which was serialized in Shueisha's Weekly Shōnen Jump manga magazine between 1993 and 1995, and was adapted into an anime series and film. A second manga titled Ninku Second Stage: Stories of Etonins (忍空 -SECOND STAGE 干支忍編-) ran from 2005 to 2011 in the seinen magazine Ultra Jump. His works inspired artists such as Masashi Kishimoto of Naruto fame, who used to copy Kiriyama's drawings in his studying to become a manga artist.

== Works ==
Title	Year	Notes	Refs
Sengoku Koshien: Kyū inu-shi densetsu (戦国甲子園九犬士伝説, Sengoku Koshien: Nine dog fighters legend)	1991–92 (vols.)	Shonen Sunday Comics; Published by Shogakukan, 6 volumes	ISBN 9784091556615 ISBN 9784091226662
Ninku	1993–95	Serialized in Weekly Shonen Jump; Published in Jump Comics by Shueisha in 9 volumes	
Ninku -Second Stage: Stories of Eto Nin- (Ninku -SECOND STAGE:干支忍編-, Ninku -Second Stage: Eto Nin-hen-)	2005–11	Serialized in Ultra Jump; Published by Shueisha in 12 volumes	
