= Koji Inada =

Japanese manga artist (born 1964)

- Born: March 14, 1964 (age 62) Nippori, Arakawa, Tokyo, Japan
- Area: Manga artist
- Notable works: Dragon Quest: The Adventure of Dai; Beet the Vandel Buster

Koji Inada (Japanese: 稲田 浩司, Hepburn: Inada Kōji; born March 14, 1964) is a Japanese manga artist. He graduated from Tokyo Metropolitan College of Aeronautical Engineering. He is best known for Dragon Quest: The Adventure of Dai (1989–1996), which he created with writer Riku Sanjo and is one of the best-selling manga in history with over 50 million copies sold. The two also created Beet the Vandel Buster (2002–2006, 2016–present), which has 4 million copies in print.

== Career ==
Koji Inada became interested in manga in middle school through Ashita no Joe. He read Shotaro Ishinomori's Mangaka Nyumon, and was drawing a lot of manga and submitting them to contests by the time he entered high school. At his parents' suggestion, he attended a technical college to become an engineer and eventually stopped drawing manga. But when he graduated and was about to find a job, he changed his mind and decided to become a manga artist. After approaching Weekly Shōnen Jump, Kazuhiko Torishima became his editor. Believing he had great compositional skills and that his art style had warmth, Torishima thought Inada could get serialized with a love story, but this never happened. Instead, he worked as an assistant to Masakazu Katsura and his own one-shots were collected and published as Kusottare Dazee!! in 1988.

While waiting for Dragon Quest IV to be made, Torishima had the idea to create an original manga based on the video game franchise and tapped Riku Sanjo to write it. When the artist he originally planned to have illustrate the work turned it down, Torishima offered Inada the job. Inada also initially turned it down as he was dead set on creating his own original series, but accepted when Torishima threatened to drop him if he passed on the job. Initially, the work was a two-part one-shot titled "Gush! Gulp!", which was then followed by the three part one-shot "Dai o' Might!!!". Due to their reception, a serialization was approved and Dragon Quest: The Adventure of Dai began in Weekly Shōnen Jump in October 1989. It continued until 1996 and has sold over 50 million copies, making it one of the best-selling manga in history.

Inada and Sanjo continued to work together, and started Beet the Vandel Buster in Monthly Shōnen Jump in 2002. Inada became ill in September 2006, which led to a lengthy hiatus for the series from volume 12. Beet briefly returned in 2016 in Jump SQ.Crown, as Monthly Shōnen Jump had been discontinued. It fully resumed two years later, being serialized in Jump SQ.Rise since 2018. It has over 4 million copies in print.

Inada designed the characters Meiro and Damudo for the 2020 arcade game Dragon Quest: The Adventure of Dai – Xross Blade.

== Works ==
- Kusottare Dazee!! (クソッタレだぜェ!!; 1988): Short story collection
- Dragon Quest: The Adventure of Dai (DRAGON QUEST -ダイの大冒険-; 1989–1996): Story by Riku Sanjo
- Iruka Iwa de... (イルカ岩で…; 1998): One-shot
- Dragon Quest IV Gaiden: Jigoku no Meikyū (DRAGON QUEST IV外伝 -地獄の迷宮-; 2001–2002): Story by Riku Sanjo
- Beet the Vandel Buster (冒険王ビィト; 2002–2006, 2016–present): Story by Riku Sanjo
