= Riku Sanjo =

Japanese manga writer and screenwriter (born 1964)

Riku Sanjo 三条 陸
- Born: October 3, 1964 (age 62) Ōita Prefecture, Japan
- Areas: Manga writer, screenwriter

Riku Sanjo (Japanese: 三条 陸, Hepburn: Sanjō Riku; born October 3, 1964) is a Japanese manga writer and screenwriter. He works as a story writer for manga, anime and live-action film. Sanjo graduated from Meiji University.

Dragon Quest: The Adventure of Dai (1989–1996), which he created with illustrator Koji Inada, is one of the best-selling manga in history with over 47 million copies sold. The two also created Beet the Vandel Buster (2002–2006, 2016–present), which has 4 million copies in print.

== Selected works ==
=== Anime ===
==== OVAs ====
- MD Geist (1986)
- Cybernetics Guardian (1989)
- The Guyver: Bio-Booster Armor (1989–1990)
- MD Geist II: Death Force (1996)
- Ultraman Super Fighter Legend (1996)

==== Television ====
- series head writer denoted in bold
- **Gaiking: Legend of Daiku-Maryu** (2005–2006)
- **Happy Lucky Bikkuriman** (2006–2007): eps 20-46
- **GeGeGe no Kitarō 5th series** (2007–2009): eps 27–100
- **Digimon Fusion** (2010–2012)

==== Film ====
- Gegege no Kitarō: Explosive Japan!! (2008)

=== Manga ===
==== Dragon Quest ====
- Dragon Quest: The Adventure of Dai (1989–1996)
- Dragon Quest IV Gaiden -The Labyrinth of Hell (December 2001-January 2002)
- Dragon Quest: Dai no Daibouken - Yuusha Avan to Gokuen no Maou (2020–present)

==== Other Manga ====
- Ultraman Super Fighter Legend (1993–1997): as Ryu Sagawa
- Beet the Vandel Buster (2002–present)
- Fuuto PI (2017–present)
- Ziga (2018): as Rokurō Sano

=== Live-action TV ===
- series head writer denoted in bold
- Cutey Honey The Live (2007)
- **Kamen Rider W** (2009–2010)
- Kamen Rider Fourze (2011–2012)
- **Zyuden Sentai Kyoryuger** (2013–2014)
- Satria Garuda BIMA-X (2014–2015)
- **Kamen Rider Drive** (2014–2015)
- Kamen Rider Zero-One (2019–2020)
- Mashin Sentai Kiramager (2020)

=== Live-action films ===
- Kamen Rider × Kamen Rider W & Decade: Movie War 2010 (2009)
  - Kamen Rider W: Begins Night
- Kamen Rider W Forever: A to Z/The Gaia Memories of Fate (2010)
- Kamen Rider × Kamen Rider OOO & W Featuring Skull: Movie War Core (2010)
  - Kamen Rider Skull: Message for Double
  - Movie War Core
- Kamen Rider Eternal (2011)
- Piece~Fragments of a Memory~ (2012)
- Zyuden Sentai Kyoryuger: Gaburincho of Music (2013)
- Zyuden Sentai Kyoryuger vs. Go-Busters: The Great Dinosaur Battle! Farewell Our Eternal Friends (2014)
- Zyuden Sentai Kyoryuger Returns: 100 Years After (2014)
- Kamen Rider × Kamen Rider Drive & Gaim: Movie War Full Throttle (2014)
  - Kamen Rider Drive: The Challenge From Lupin
  - Movie War Full Throttle
- Kamen Rider Drive: Surprise Future (2015)
- Drive Saga: Kamen Rider Chaser (2016)
- Drive Saga: Kamen Rider Heart (2016)
- Drive Saga: Kamen Rider Brain (2019)
