= List of series run in Jump Square =

Jump Square cover for its 10th anniversary in 2017

Jump Square, a monthly shōnen manga magazine published by Shueisha, has featured numerous series since its launch in 2007. The list, organized by decade and year of when the series started, will list each series run in the manga magazine, the author of the series and, in case the series has ended, when it has ended.

== 2000s ==
=== 2007–2009 ===
Manga	First Issue	Final Issue	Manga artist(s)
Akiba Zaijū (アキバザイジュウ)	#12, 2007	#8, 2008	Daisuke Kadokuni
Claymore	#12, 2007 (Note: Transferred from Monthly Shōnen Jump)	#11, 2014	Norihiro Yagi
Dragonaut: The Resonance (ドラゴノーツ -ザ·レゾナンス-)	#12, 2007	#5, 2008	NAS, Satoshi Kinoshita
Embalming: The Another Tale of Frankenstein (エンバーミング -THE ANOTHER TALE OF FRANKENSTEIN-)	#12, 2007	#5, 2015	Nobuhiro Watsuki, Kaoru Kurosaki
Kiyoku Tadashiku Utsukushiku (清く正しく美しく)	#12, 2007	#3, 2008 (Note: Moved to online release)	Ufotable, TāTan Check
Kure-nai (紅 kure-nai)	#12, 2007	#7, 2012	Kentarō Katayama, Yamato Yamamoto, Hideaki Koyasu, Daisuke Furuya
Luck Stealer	#12, 2007	#2, 2012	Hajime Kazu
Mahō no Ryōri Chaos Kitchen (魔法の料理 かおすキッチン)	#12, 2007	#6, 2009	Shōta Hattori
Masuda Kōsuke Gekijō Gag Manga Biyori (増田こうすけ劇場 ギャグマンガ日和)	#12, 2007	#14, 2014	Kōsuke Masuda
Matsuri Special (まつりスペシャル)	#12, 2007	#10, 2009	Yoko Kamio
Parman no Jōnetsuteki na Hibi (PARマンの情熱的な日々)	#12, 2007	#12, 2015 (on hiatus)	Fujiko Fujio Ⓐ
Pat-Ken (パト犬)	#12, 2007	#11, 2008	Masanori • Ōkamigumi • Katakura
Rosario + Vampire: Season II (ロザリオとバンパイア seasonII, Rosario to Vampire Season Two)	#12, 2007	#3, 2014 (Note: Epilogue published in Jump SQ.19)	Akihisa Ikeda
Sekai no Chūshin de Taiyō ni Hoeru (世界の中心で太陽にほえる)	#12, 2007	#8, 2008	Ponse Maeda
Tales of Innocence	#12, 2007	#6, 2008	Namco Bandai Games, Hiroyuki Kaidō
Tegami Bachi (テガミバチ)	#12, 2007	#12, 2015	Hiroyuki Asada
Tista	#12, 2007	#8, 2008	Tatsuya Endo
Tsumikabatsu (罪花罰)	#12, 2007	#10, 2010	Honemaru Mikami
Shiki (屍鬼)	#1, 2008	#7, 2011	Fuyumi Ono, Ryū Fujisaki
Hōkago Wind Orchestra (放課後ウインド·オーケストラ)	#4, 2008	#6, 2009 (Note: Moved to Jump SQ.II)	Yūichirō Usa
Binbō-gami ga! (貧乏神が!)	#7, 2008	#8, 2013	Yoshiaki Sukeno
Kuzumoto-san Chi no yon Kyōdai (葛本さんちの四兄弟)	#8, 2008	#7, 2009	Satoshi Kinoshita
Yoku Wakaru Gendai Mahō (よくわかる現代魔法)	#9, 2008	#10, 2009	Hiroshi Sakurazaka, Miki Miyashita
Genkaku Picasso (幻覚ピカソ)	#10, 2008	#5, 2010	Usamaru Furuya
Airebo: Ice Revolution (アイレボ -Ice Revolution-)	#12, 2008	#8, 2009	Aya Tsutsumi, Yōhei Takemura
Hōkago no Ōjisama (放課後の王子様)	#12, 2008	Present	Takeshi Konomi, Kenichi Sakura
Kekkai Sensen: Mafūgai Kessha (血界戦線-魔封街結社-)	#2, 2009	#4, 2009	Yasuhiro Nightow
Ultimo (機巧童子ULTIMO, Karakuri Dōji Ultimo)	#3, 2009	#2, 2012 (Note: Moved to Jump SQ.19)	Stan Lee, Hiroyuki Takei
The Prince of Tennis II (新テニスの王子様)	#4, 2009	#9, 2026	Takeshi Konomi
Blue Exorcist (青の祓魔師, Ao no Exorcist)	#5, 2009	Present	Kazue Kato
Goshimei Desu! (ご指名です!)	#9, 2009	#11, 2009	Mayu Shinjo
Dust to Dust	#10, 2009	#12, 2009	Tokihiko Ishiki
Dr. Rurru (Dr.るっる)	#11, 2009	#10, 2010	Risou Maeda
D.Gray-man	#12, 2009 (Note: Transferred from Weekly Shōnen Jump)	#2, 2013 (Note: Moved to Jump SQ.Crown)	Katsura Hoshino
Shonbori Onsen (しょんぼり温泉)	#12, 2009	#2, 2012	Tobira Oda

== 2010s ==
=== 2010–2014 ===
Manga	First Issue	Final Issue	Manga artist
Kakko Kawaii Sengen! (カッコカワイイ宣言!)	#2, 2010	#4, 2014	Jigoku no Misawa
Mayoi Neko Overrun! (迷い猫オーバーラン!)	#2, 2010	#9, 2010	Tomohiro Matsu, Kentaro Yabuki, Peco
Sengoku Basara 3 -Roar of Dragon- (戦国BASARA3 -ROAR OF DRAGON-)	#3, 2010	#12, 2010	Asagi Ooga, Capcom
Blade of the Moon Princess (月華美刃, Gekka Bijin)	#6, 2010	#2, 2012	Tatsuya Endō
Donten Prism Solar Car (曇天・プリズム・ソーラーカー)	#10, 2010	#7, 2011	Yasuo Ōtagaki, Yūsuke Murata
To Love Ru Darkness (To LOVEる -とらぶる- ダークネス)	#11, 2010	#4, 2017	Kentarō Yabuki, Saki Hasemi
Examurai (エグザムライ)	#12, 2010	#8, 2011	Hiro, Makoto Matsuda, Yōichi Amano
Mitokon (ミトコン)	#2, 2011	#10, 2011 (Note: Moved to Monthly Comic@Bunch)	Man☆Gatarō
Gate 7	#3, 2011	on hiatus	Clamp
Boku to Majo no Jikan (ボクと魔女の時間)	#5-6, 2011	#5, 2013	Shin Arakawa
Hanimero (はにめろ。)	#7, 2011	#6, 2012	Shiori Furukawa
Hasebe-san no iru Yakyūbu (長谷部さんのいる野球部)	#8, 2011	#6, 2012	Shōgo Ueno
Papa no Iukoto o Kikinasai! (パパのいうことを聞きなさい!)	#9, 2011	#4, 2012	Tomohiro Matsu, Yōhei Takemura, Yuka Nakajima
Boku no Manga (ボクのマンガ)	#1, 2012	#8, 2015	Ryōsuke Kataoka
1/11 Jūichi Bun no Ichi (1/11 じゅういちぶんのいち)	#2, 2012 (Note: Transferred from Jump SQ.19)	#7, 2014	Takatoshi Nakamura
Gokigen Steady (ごきげんステディ)	#3, 2012	#11, 2012	Shōsuke Yoshinogawa
Teiichi no Kuni (帝一の國)	#3, 2012	#5, 2016	Usamaru Furuya
Adashi Mono (あだしもの)	#4, 2012	#1, 2013	Kumiko Yamamoto
Chiisana Hiroba (ちいさな広場)	#4, 2012	#7, 2012	Haruki Sakurai
Ano Hi Mita Hana no Namae o Bokutachi wa Mada Shiranai (あの日見た花の名前を僕達はまだ知らない。)	#5, 2012	#5, 2013	Chōheiwa Busters, Mitsu Izumi
Rurouni Kenshin: Restoration (るろうに剣心 -キネマ版-, Rurōni Kenshin: Kinema-ban)	#6, 2012	#7, 2013	Nobuhiro Watsuki
Senyu (戦勇。)	#6, 2012	#5, 2013	Robinson Haruhara
Kono Oto Tomare! Sounds of Life (この音とまれ!)	#9, 2012	Present	Amyū
Talento Funsōki Koppy (タレント暴走記koppy)	#9, 2012	#12, 2014	Koppy
Tanken Driland (探検ドリランド)	#9, 2012	#4, 2013	Gree, Tatsurō Sakaguchi, Yōichi Takahashi
Seraph of the End (終わりのセラフ, Owari no Seraph)	#10, 2012	Present	Takaya Kagami, Yamato Yamamoto, Daisuke Furuya
Kanshikan Tsunemori Akane (監視官 常守朱)	#12, 2012	#6, 2013	Psycho-Pass Production Committee, Hikaru Miyoshi, Akira Amano, Gen Urobuchi (Nitroplus)
Yae no Sakura (八重の桜)	#1, 2013	#12, 2013	Mutsumi Yamamoto, Yōhei Takemura
Ikusaba Animation (戦場アニメーション -IKUSABA ANIMATION-)	#2, 2013	#1, 2014	Takahiro Nakada
γ -Gamma- (γ -ガンマ-)	#4, 2013	#11, 2014	Jun Ogino
Te to Kuchi (てとくち)	#6, 2013	#1, 2015	Tomohito Ohsaki, Mizuki Kawashita
Fantasma	#8, 2013	#4, 2014	Yuji Kaku
Taishō Roman Oni-san Yameteee!! (大正浪漫 鬼さんやめてえぇっ!!)	#9, 2013	#8, 2014	Hidekaz Himaruya
Shinai Naru Koroshiya-sama (親愛なる殺し屋様)	#11, 2013	#6, 2015	Petenshi
Twin Star Exorcists (双星の陰陽師, Sōsei no Onmyōji)	#12, 2013	#10, 2024	Yoshiaki Sukeno
Second Brain	#1, 2014	#7, 2014	Akira Takahashi
Gakumon! Ohkami Shōjo wa Kujikenai (がくモン!〜オオカミ少女はくじけない〜)	#5, 2014	#1, 2016	Robinson Haruhara
Iiyone! Yonezawa Sensei (いいよね! 米澤先生)	#5, 2014	#6, 2017	Jigoku no Misawa
μ&i Mu and I (μ&i みゅうあんどあい)	#6, 2014	#4, 2016	Ryōma Kitada
Nightmare Funk (ナイトメア・ファンク)	#8, 2014	#11, 2015	Yōhei Takemura
Rurouni Kenshin: Master of Flame (炎を統べる -るろうに剣心・裏幕-, Honō wo Suberu Rurōni Kenshin Uramaku-)	#8, 2014	#10, 2014	Nobuhiro Watsuki
7thGarden	#9, 2014	#4, 2017	Mitsu Izumi
Hotel Helheim (ホテル ヘルヘイム)	#11, 2014	#9, 2015	Osamu Nishi

=== 2015–2019 ===
Manga	First Issue	Final Issue	Manga artist
Chihaya-san wa Sonomama de Ii (千早さんはそのままでいい)	#1, 2015	#5, 2018	Kuzushiro
Hanna Sensei Shigoto wo Shitekudasai! (ハンナ先生仕事をしてください!)	#1, 2015	#5, 2015	Tetsuya Hayashi
Masuda Kōsuke Gekijō Gag Manga Biyori GB (増田こうすけ劇場 ギャグマンガ日和GB)	#1, 2015	Present	Kōsuke Masuda
Salaryman Futsumashi Okumura Yukio no Aishū (サラリーマン祓魔師 奥村雪男の哀愁)	#5, 2015	#5, 2020	Kazue Katō, Minoru Sasaki
Serapuchi! Owari no Seraph 4-koma-hen (せらぷち!〜終わりのセラフ4コマ編〜)	#5, 2015	#1, 2016	Takaya Kagami, Yamato Yamamoto, Daisuke Furuya, Ren Aokita, Owari no Seraph Production Committee
Wonder Rabbit Girl (ワンダーラビットガール)	#6, 2015	#7, 2017	Yui Hirose
Taishō Otome Otogibanashi (大正処女御伽話)	#8, 2015	#10, 2017	Sana Kirioka
Happy Mily (ハッピィミリィ)	#9, 2015	#8, 2017	Mitsuru Kido
Ohmori Satisfaction (大森サティスファクション)	#9, 2015	#8, 2017	Kōsei Shimizu
Yami Abaki Kurau Miko (ヤミアバキクラウミコ)	#11, 2015	#8, 2016	Yui Jōyama
Platinum End (プラチナエンド)	#12, 2015	#2, 2021	Tsugumi Ohba, Takeshi Obata
Contrast 88 (コントラスト88)	#1, 2016	#12, 2016	Chū Kawasaki
Shōnen Shōjo (症年症女)	#2, 2016	#5, 2017	Isin Nisio, Akira Akatsuki
Densetsu no Yūsha no Konkatsu (伝説の勇者の婚活)	#6, 2016	#8, 2017	Takatoshi Nakamura
Qualidea Code (クオリディア・コード)	#9, 2016	#12, 2016	Speakeasy (Sō Sagara, Kōshi Tachibana, Wataru Watari), Risō Maeda
Moriarty the Patriot (憂国のモリアーティ, Yūkoku no Moriarty)	#9, 2016	Present	Arthur Conan Doyle (Sherlock Holmes series), Ryōsuke Takeuchi, Hikaru Miyoshi
Kemono Jihen (怪物事変)	#1, 2017	Present	Shō Aimoto
Black Torch	#2, 2017	#4, 2018 (Note: Moved to Shōnen Jump+)	Tsuyoshi Takaki
Mr. Clice	#3, 2017	#2, 2018	Osamu Akimoto
Super HxEros (ド級編隊エグゼロス, Dokyū Hentai HxEros)	#6, 2017	#3, 2021	Ryōma Kitada
Futaribocchi Sensō (ふたりぼっち戦争)	#7, 2017	#5, 2018	Erubo Hijihara
Katsugeki/Touken Ranbu (活撃 刀剣乱舞)	#8, 2017	#1, 2018	DMM Games, Nitroplus, Honami Tsuda
Yūgai Shitei Dōkyūsei (有害指定同級生)	#8, 2017	#10, 2019	Kuroha
Sentaku no Toki (選択のトキ)	#9, 2017	#7, 2018	Kiri Gunchi
Rurouni Kenshin: The Hokkaido Arc (るろうに剣心 -明治剣客浪漫譚・北海道編-, Rurōni Kenshin -Meiji Kenkaku Roman-tan Hokkaido-hen-)	#10, 2017	Present	Nobuhiro Watsuki, Kaworu Kurosaki
Märchen Mädchen (メルヘン・メドヘン)	#11, 2017	#6, 2018	Tomohiro Matsu, StoryWorks, Kantoku, Takatoshi Nakamura, Kiyotsugu Yamagata
Majo no Kaiga-shū (魔女の怪画集)	#12, 2017	#2, 2020	Hachi
Demon Tune	#2, 2018	#1, 2019	Yūki Kodama
Chinosoko no Mahōtsukai (地の底の魔法使い)	#4, 2018	#11, 2018	Yariku Hirahama
Untrace (アントレース)	#5, 2018	#3, 2019	Kappy, Shun Haruse
Kojirase Hyakki Do Minor (こじらせ百鬼ドマイナー)	#6, 2018	#5, 2020	Kōta Nangō
Mona Lisa Mania (モナリザマニア)	#11, 2018	#9, 2019	Yoshikage
Boxer's Blast	#12, 2018	#10, 2019	Atsurō Sakai, Akira Akatsuki
Otome no Harawata Hoshi no Iro (乙女のはらわた星の色)	#1, 2019	#3, 2020	Yūra Ishito
World Trigger (ワールドトリガー)	#1, 2019	Present	Daisuke Ashihara
Dark Gathering (ダークギャザリング)	#4, 2019	Present	Kenichi Kondō
Too Cute Crisis (カワイスギクライシス)	#11, 2019	Present	Kido Mitsuru
Dear Call (Dear CALL -ディアコール-)	#12, 2019	#2, 2021	Gunchi Kiri

== 2020s ==
=== 2020–2024 ===
Manga	First Issue	Final Issue	Manga artist
Desert 9 (第9砂漠)	#2, 2020	#6, 2021	Kei Deguchi
Boku to Kimi no Nihu Tantei (ボクとキミの二重探偵)	#3, 2020	#4, 2023	Petenshi, Tsuda Honami
This Communication (Thisコミュニケーション)	#4, 2020	#4, 2024	Maruei Rokudai
Prime Minister Club (総理倶楽部)	#2, 2021	#11, 2023	Hidekaz Himaruya
Nazo o Tokumi no Bakuretsu Suiri!! (謎尾解美の爆裂推理!!)	#2, 2021	#12, 2021	Oginuma X
Meishisu!!! Trouble Maid Sisters (めいしす!!! トラブルメイドシスターズ)	#3, 2021	#6, 2022	Shuu Nagata
Eizen Karukaya Kaiitan (営繕かるかや怪異譚)	#10, 2021	#5, 2022	Kazue Kato, Fuyumi Ono
Show-ha Shoten! (ショーハショーテン!)	#11, 2021	#9, 2025	Akinari Asakura, Takeshi Obata
Katayoku no Michaelangelo (片翼のミケランジェロ)	#1, 2022	#7, 2023	Shamu Itou
The Bugle Call: Song of War (戦奏教室, Sensō Kyōshitsu)	#7, 2022	#5, 2026 (Note: Moved to Jump SQ.Rise)	Sora Mozuku, Toumori Higoro
Gokurakugai (極楽街)	#8, 2022	Present	Sano Yuto
Datenshi-ron (堕天使論)	#10, 2022	#3, 2024	Kuroha
Yūkoku no Moriarty: The Remains (憂国のモリアーティ -The Remains-)	#4, 2023	#8, 2024	Yosuke Saito, Hikaru Miyoshi
Yūgen Sekai no Ein Sof (有限世界のアインソフ)	#4, 2023	#2, 2024	Tomio Hidaka
Phantom Busters (ファントムバスターズ)	#9, 2023	Present	Shoco Neo
Danbooru Bachelor (ダンボールバチェラー)	#10, 2023	#6, 2024	Natsuo Shouji, Ryouta Yorimitsu
Ookami Otoko to Nurikabe-chan (オオカミ男とぬりかべちゃん)	#11, 2023	#3, 2025	Kentarou Odaka
Akanabe-sensei wa Tereshirazu (茜部先生は照れ知らず)	#12, 2023	Present	Naoya Tajimi
Oshi wo Katachi ni suru Shigoto (推しをカタチにする仕事)	#12, 2023	#2, 2026	Kyoutarō Andō
Kodomo no Kuni (こどものくに)	#1, 2024	#11, 2024	Kashimiharu
Kentoushi AtoZ (剣闘士AtoZ)	#2, 2024	#9, 2024	Kenji Saitō, Yohan
Ame to Umi (あめとうみ)	#12, 2024	#9, 2026	Atsuka Yamagata

=== 2025–present ===
Manga	First Issue	Final Issue	Manga artist(s)
Gilded Enemy (ギルデッドエネミー)	#1, 2025	#3, 2026	Ryou Hattori
Hanakaze Killertune (華風キラーチューン)	#4, 2025	#2, 2026	Emi Watanabe, Shunta Mizoguchi
Za Wanwanzu (ザ・ワンワンズ)	#5, 2025	#5, 2026	Inutaro Mikashima
Iroha no Mon (いろはの門)	#6, 2025	Present	Honami Tsuda
Mashiro-kun no Hokou Atelier (ましろくんの補講アトリエ)	#7, 2025	Present	Hyakuhachi Yamamoto
Maōjō Sideway (魔王城サイドウェイ)	#9, 2025	Present	Kosei Shimizu, Ukai Itsuki
Gintama: 3-Nen Z-Gumi Ginpachi-sensei (銀魂 3年Z組銀八先生)	#2, 2026	Present	Yūki Aonuma, Hideaki Sorachi, Tomohito Ohsaki, Ao Suzumemura
Ao no Kai (アオの解)	#3, 2026	Present	Masaru Miyokawa, Ryosuke Takeuchi
Odaroku (オダロク)	#5, 2026	Present	Strike Tanaka
Rabbit Chaser (ラビットチェイサー)	#6, 2026	Present	Yohan
Higan no Hotaru (彼岸の螢)	#7, 2026	Present	Maccha Mochizuki
Ray by Day (レイバイデイ)	#8, 2026	Present	Kouji Ohno
Boku no Kanojo wa Kessen Heiki (僕の彼女は決戦兵器)	#9, 2026	Present	Tetsuya Tashiro

== Online manga series ==
Manga	First Distribution	Final Distribution	Manga artist
Mahō-tsukai Kurohime (魔砲使い黒姫)	November 2, 2007	February 4, 2011	Masanori • Ōkamigumi • Katakura
Tales of Innocence (テイルズオブイノセンス)	June 4, 2008 (Note: Transferred from Jump Square)	September 4, 2008	Namco Bandai Games, Hiroyuki Kaidō
Sekai no Chūshin de Taiyō ni Hoeru (世界の中心で太陽にほえる)	August 4, 2008	October 4, 2008	Ponse Maeda
Kiyoku Tadashiku Utsukushiku (清く正しく美しく)	November 4, 2008	September 4, 2009	Ufotable, TāTan Check
Mahō no Ryōri Chaos Kitchen (魔法の料理 かおすキッチン)	June 4, 2009	September 4, 2009	Shōta Hattori
Dark Act (ダークアクト)	September 3, 2011	February 3, 2012	Shōta Hattori
Agrippa (アグリッパ -AGRIPPA-)	November 2, 2012	February 4, 2013	Tohru Uchimizu
Kanshikan Tsunemori Akane (監視官 常守朱)	June 4, 2013	December 4, 2014	Psycho-Pass Production Committee, Hikaru Miyoshi, Akira Amano, Gen Urobuchi (Nitroplus)
Hanna Sensei Shigoto wo Shitekudasai! (ハンナ先生仕事をしてください!)	October 16, 2015	December 4, 2015	Tetsuya Hayashi
Qualidea Code (クオリディア・コード)	December 2, 2016	May 2, 2017	Speakeasy (Sō Sagara, Kōshi Tachibana, Wataru Watari), Risō Maeda
Katsugeki Tōken Ranbu (活撃 刀剣乱舞)	January 4, 2018	April 4, 2019	DMM Games, Nitroplus, Honami Tsuda

== Jump SQ.19 manga series ==
Manga	First Issue	Final Issue	Manga artist
1/11 Jūichi Bun no Ichi (1/11 じゅういちぶんのいち)	First Issue, 2010	Winter Issue, 2011 (Note: Moved to Jump Square)	Takatoshi Nakamura
Agrippa (アグリッパ -AGRIPPA-)	First Issue, 2010	Vol.2	Tohru Uchimizu
Chikyū Shinryaku! Corleonis (地球侵略! コルレオニス)	First Issue, 2010	Winter Issue, 2011	Satoshi Kimura
Himaspe Usagi! (ひまスペ兎!)	First Issue, 2010	Vol.3	Yūki Nakashima
Blood Blockade Battlefront (血界戦線, Kekkai Sensen)	First Issue, 2010	Vol.18	Yasuhiro Nightow
Kigeki no Heroine! (喜劇のヒロイン!)	First Issue, 2010	Winter Issue, 2011	Yūki Shinzato
Motemushi Ōja Kabuto King (モテ虫王者カブトキング)	First Issue, 2010	Vol.2	Namie Odama
Teiichi no Kuni (帝一の國)	First Issue, 2010	Autumn Issue, 2011	Usamaru Furuya
Tonari no Randoseru w (となりのランドセルw)	First Issue, 2010	Vol.15	Miki Miyashita
Wakaki Utsumaru no Nayami (若きウツマルの悩み)	First Issue, 2010	Winter Issue, 2011	Honemaru Mikami
Ⓖ Edition (Ⓖえでぃしょん)	First Issue, 2010	Vol.5	Mizuki Kawashita
Mayoi Neko Overrun! (迷い猫オーバーラン!)	Summer Issue, 2010	Autumn Issue, 2010	Tomohiro Matsu, Kentarō Yabuki, Peco
Mizutsukai no Rindō (水使いのリンドウ)	Summer Issue, 2010	Vol.2	Tokihiko Ishiki
Boku wa Tomodachi ga Sukunai + (僕は友達が少ない+)	Fall Issue, 2010	Vol.2	Yomi Hirasaka, Shōichi Taguchi, Misaki Harukawa, Buriki
To Love Ru Darkness Bangaihen (To LOVEる -とらぶる- ダークネス 番外編)	Winter Issue, 2011	Vol.15	Kentarō Yabuki, Saki Hasemi
Dotto Invader (ドットインベーダー)	Winter Issue, 2011	Vol.2	Minoru Sasaki
Comical! (コミカル!)	Winter Issue, 2012	Vol.12	Tomohiro Shimomura
Ultimo (機巧童子ULTIMO, Karakuri Dôji Ultimo)	Winter Issue, 2012	Vol.18	Stan Lee, Hiroyuki Takei
Papa no Iukoto o Kikinasai! (パパのいうことを聞きなさい!)	Vol.1	Vol.4	Tomohiro Matsu, Yōhei Takemura, Yuka Nakajima
Toki to Eien〜Tokitowa〜 (時と永遠〜トキトワ〜)	Vol.2	Vol.4	Bandai Namco Games, Kikō Aiba, Vofan
Umania ☆ (ゆーまにあ☆)	Vol.2	Vol.7	Yurika Yadomi
Tanken Driland -The Episode of Another Hunter- (探検ドリランド -The Episode of Another Hunter-)	Vol.3	Vol.7	Gree, Yūki Konno, Yōichi Takahashi
Libido Hunter Takeru (リビドーハンタータケル)	Vol.4	Vol.18	Yui Jōyama
Gokigen Steady (ごきげんステディ)	Vol.5	Vol.9	Shōsuke Yoshinogawa
Adashi Mono (あだしもの)	Vol.6	Vol.9	Kumiko Yamamoto
Kakumei-ki Valvrave (革命機ヴァルヴレイヴ)	Vol.9	Vol.11	Sunrise, Karegashi Tsuchiya, Katsura Hoshino
Cherry Teacher Sakura Naoki (CHERRY TEACHER 佐倉直生)	Vol.10	Vol.18	Kazumi Tachibana
Salaryman Exorcist Okumura Yukio no Aishū (サラリーマン祓魔師 奥村雪男の哀愁)	Vol.10	Vol.18	Kazue Katō, Minoru Sasaki
Shakunetsu no Takkyū Musume (灼熱の卓球娘)	Vol.11	Vol.18 (Note: Moved to Tonari no Young Jump)	Yagura Asano
Hakoniwa Yūgi (箱庭遊戯)	Vol.12	Vol.17	Aya Tanaka
Fantasma	Vol.13	Vol.14	Yūji Kaku
Serapuchi!～Owari no Seraph 4-koma-hen～ (せらぷち!～終わりのセラフ4コマ編～)	Vol.17	Vol.18	Takaya Kagami, Yamato Yamamoto, Daisuke Furuya, Ren Aokita, Owari no Seraph Production Committee

== Jump SQ.Crown manga series ==
Manga	First Issue	Final Issue	Manga artist
D.Gray-man (ディー・グレイマン)	Summer, 2015	Winter, 2018	Katsura Hoshino
Kekkai Sensen Back 2 Back (血界戦線 Back 2 Back)	Summer, 2015	Winter, 2018	Yasuhiro Nightow
Serapuchi!〜Owari no Seraph 4-koma-hen〜 (せらぷち!〜終わりのセラフ4コマ編〜)	Summer, 2015	Autumn, 2015	Takaya Kagami, Yamato Yamamoto, Daisuke Furuya, Ren Aokita, Owari no Seraph Production Committee
Beet the Vandel Buster (冒険王ビィト, Bōken Ō Beet)	Spring, 2016	Winter, 2018	Riku Sanjō, Kōji Inada, Katsuyoshi Nakatsuru
Sōsei no Onmyōji Adashino Benio-hen (双星の陰陽師 化野紅緒編)	Summer, 2017	Winter, 2018	Yoshiaki Sukeno

== Jump SQ.Rise manga series ==
Manga	First Issue	Final Issue	Manga artist
Beet the Vandel Buster (冒険王ビィト, Bōken Ō Beet)	Spring, 2018 (Note: Moved from Jump SQ.Crown)	Present	Riku Sanjō, Kōji Inada, Katsuyoshi Nakatsuru
D.Gray-man (ディー・グレイマン)	Spring, 2018	Present	Katsura Hoshino
Kekkai Sensen Back 2 Back (血界戦線 Back 2 Back)	Spring, 2018	Spring, 2022	Yasuhiro Nightow
Mr. Clice (ミスタークリス)	Spring, 2018	Present	Osamu Akimoto
Kekkai Sensen Beat 3 Peat (血界戦線 Beat 3 Peat)	Fall, 2022	Present	Yasuhiro Nightow
The Bugle Call: Song of War (戦奏教室, Sensō Kyōshitsu)	Summer, 2026	Present	Sora Mozuku, Toumori Higoro

== Super Dash Manga Program Series ==
Super Dash Manga Program (スーパーダッシュ漫画プログラム, Suupaa Dasshu Manga Programu) shortened to SDMP, is the supplement manga magazine of Jump Square. It is published from April 21 to October 4 of 2011. Super Dash Manga Program focuses on series and one shots of the comicalization on light novels from Super Dash Bunko.

Manga	First Issue	Final Issue	Manga artist
Ben・To zero Road to witch (ベン・トーzero Road to witch)	#5-6, 2011	#10, 2011	Asaura, Kaito Shibano

== Light novels ==
Jump j-Books (JUMP j-BOOKS) light novels were serialized near the end of Jump SQ and in Super Dash Manga Program.

Light Novel	First Issue	Final Issue	Author
3-Nen Z-Gumi Ginpachi-Sensei (3年Z組銀八先生)	#1, 2008	#6, 2008	Hideaki Sorachi, Hitoshi Ōsakichi
Katekyo Hitman Reborn! Kakushidan (家庭教師ヒットマンREBORN! 隠し弾)	#8, 2008	#4, 2009	Akira Amano, Hideaki Koyasu
Ben・To Kanshokuhan (ベン・トー間食版)	#5-6, 2011 (Serialized in Super Dash Manga Program)	#10, 2011	Asaura
