= Denpa teki na Kanojo =

Japanese light novel

- Cover of the first light novel

電波的な彼女
- Light novel
- Written by: Kentarō Katayama
- Illustrated by: Yamato Yamamoto
- Published by: Shueisha
- Imprint: Super Dash Bunko
- Original run: September 22, 2004 – July 22, 2005
- Volumes: 3
- Original video animation
- Directed by: Mamoru Kanbe
- Produced by: Shinya Shinozaki; Tetsurō Saitō
- Written by: Hiroyuki Yoshino
- Music by: kaji:m
- Studio: Brain's Base
- Released: 2009
- Runtime: 42-44 min. per episode
- Episodes: 2
- Manga
- Written by: Daisuke Furuya
- Illustrated by: Hiroshi Hiraoka
- Published by: Shueisha
- Magazine: Ultra Jump
- Original run: July 19, 2020 – January 19, 2021
- Volumes: 2

Denpa teki na Kanojo (電波的な彼女; lit. The Radio Wave-Like Girlfriend, translated as Electromagnetic Girlfriend) is a Japanese light novel series by Kentarō Katayama, with illustrations by Yamato Yamamoto. Three novels were published by Shueisha, under their Super Dash Bunko imprint, between 2004 and 2005. The series remains unfinished. Under the title Denpa Biyori (電波日和; lit. Radio Wave Weather), the first story in the series won an honorable mention at the Super Dash Novel Rookie of the Year Awards in 2003.

In 2009, a two-episode original video animation (OVA) adaptation was exclusively bundled with the pre-order editions of Kure-nai (another series by Katayama) DVD volumes 3 and 4.

A manga adaptation, storyboarded by Daisuke Furuya and illustrated by Hiroshi Hiraoka, was serialized in Shueisha's seinen manga magazine Ultra Jump from July 2019 to January 2021, with its chapters collected in two tankōbon volumes.

== Plot ==
Juu Juuzawa (柔沢 ジュウ, Jūzawa Jū) is a delinquent high school boy who just wants to be left alone. One day, he is approached by Ame Ochibana (堕花 雨, Ochibana Ame), who claims that she knew him in a previous life, and now wants to serve him as his "knight." At first Juu wants nothing to do with Ame, but after a classmate is murdered, he accepts her help as he looks for the killer.

== Media ==
=== Light novel ===
Written by Kentarō Katayama and illustrated by Yamato Yamamoto, the Denpa teki na Kanojo novel spawned three volumes, published under the Super Dash Bunko imprint, and released from September 22, 2004, to July 22, 2005. The series remains unfinished.

==== Volume list ====
No.	Release date	ISBN
1	September 22, 2004	4-08-630206-3
2	March 25, 2005	4-08-630230-6
3	July 22, 2005	4-08-630247-0

=== Original video animation ===
The two OVA episodes are based on the first and third light novels. The second novel does not have an OVA adaptation. Juu is voiced by Yoshimasa Hosoya and Ame is voiced by Ryou Hirohashi. The ending theme for the first episode, "Taiyō" (太陽; "Sun"), is performed by Tenohira. The ending theme for the second episode, "door", is performed by Rumika.

==== Episode list ====
No.	Title	Original release date
1	"Electromagnetic Girlfriend"; Transliteration: "Denpa-teki na Kanojo" (Japanese: 電波的な彼女)	May 1, 2009
An introduction into the lead characters: delinquent high school student Juu Juuzawa and denpa high school student knight Ame Ochibana. The murders continue as method to the madness, and the mystery behind the motive, are investigated.
2	"Electromagnetic Girlfriend: Happiness Game"; Transliteration: "Denpa-teki na Kanojo: Kōfuku Gēmu" (Japanese: 電波的な彼女~幸福ゲーム~)	December 4, 2009
After being accused of being a molester, Juu is subjected to a series of pranks too small for the police to take seriously. Ame is convinced there is a pattern and as the pair investigate the danger and the damage to people around them increases drastically.

=== Manga ===
A manga adaptation, storyboarded by Daisuke Furuya and illustrated by Hiroshi Hiraoka, was serialized in Shueisha's seinen manga magazine Ultra Jump from June 19, 2020, to January 19, 2021. Its chapters were collected in two tankōbon volumes, released on January 19, 2021.
