= Super Dash Bunko =

Japanese publishing imprint

Super Dash Bunko (スーパーダッシュ文庫, Sūpā Dasshu Bunko) is a Shueisha publishing imprint established in July 2000 for publishing light novels aimed at teenage boys. In April 2001, the label inherited a strong lineup from the discontinued Super Fantasy Bunko label, in addition to inheriting all of their school life and slapstick light novel series. The label also administers the Super Dash Novel Rookie of the Year Award, given out since 2001.

Original novel series released under the label include Read or Die by Hideyuki Kurata, Happy Seven by Hiroyuki Kawasaki, Ginban Kaleidoscope by Rei Kaibara, Kure-nai by Kentarō Katayama, and Akikan! by Riku Ranjō.

== Brief history ==
Super Fantasy Bunko (スーパーファンタジー文庫, Sūpā Fantajī Bunko) was a Shuiesha publishing imprint from March 1991 until April 2001 which published fantasy light novels. Reflecting the height of the age of role-playing video games, from the very beginning their core lineup was original works set in sword and sorcery fantasy worlds. From midway to the later period of the imprint, they began publishing Japanese-style fantasies, science fiction, and mysteries. For a few titles such as Spirit Warrior and Princess Minerva, Super Fantasy novelized manga, anime, and computer games.

In contrast to their core fantasy label, they established Super Dash Bunko in July 2000 to publish school life and slapstick comedy light novel series. However, in April 2001, the Super Fantasy label was absorbed into the Super Dash label due to difficulties keeping both labels separate. Original series such as Psychedelic Rescue (サイケデリック・レスキュー, Saikederikku Reskyū) and its sequel D/d Rescue (D/dレスキュー), both by Riki Ichijō, continued under the new combined label.

In November 2014, Shueisha released a new label, Dash X Bunko, as a replacement for the Super Dash Bunko label.

Since 2001, the label has administered the Super Dash Novel Rookie of the Year Award, awarded to the best new light novel of the year. In 2007, Super Dash established the imprint Elite Novels (菁英文庫) in cooperation with Chingwin Publishing Group in Taiwan in order to facilitate publication of their works in Taiwan.

=== Selected list of Super Fantasy releases ===
Some series with at least 2 volumes are included below.

- Arc the Lad novelization, by Sakuramaru Yamada
- Ben-To by Asaura
- Combustible Campus Guardress by Satoru Akahori
- Ore-tachi no Kogane Densetsu: Dansu & Gorudo by Oji Hiroi
- Ore-tachi no Rakuen Densetsu: Dansu & Gorudo by Oji Hiroi
- Outlaw Star by Katsuhiko Chiba
- Princess Minerva by Kō Maisaka
- Spirit Warrior: Mareiroku by Shō Aikawa
