= Super Dash Novel Rookie of the Year Award =

Japanese light novel award

The Super Dash Novel Rookie of the Year Award (スーパーダッシュ小説新人賞, Sūpā Dasshu Shōsetsu Shinjin Shō) is an annual award given by Shueisha's Super Dash Bunko imprint for the best new light novel of the year. The award was first presented in 2001. Submissions are accepted until October 25 each year, and announced on April 25 of the following year.

== Company Info ==
Super Dash Bunko (スーパーダッシュ文庫, Sūpā Dasshu Bunko) is a Shueisha publishing imprint established in July 2000 for publishing light novels aimed at teenage boys. In April 2001, the label inherited a strong lineup from the discontinued Super Fantasy Bunko label, in addition to inheriting all of their school life and slapstick light novel series. The label also administers the Super Dash Novel Rookie of the Year Award, given out since 2001. Original novel series released under the label include Read or Die by Hideyuki Kurata, Happy Seven by Hiroyuki Kawasaki, Ginban Kaleidoscope by Rei Kaibara, Kure-nai by Kentarō Katayama, and Akikan! by Riku Ranjō.

== Selection committee ==
The selection committee for the first five years consisted of science fiction and fantasy author Motoko Arai, anime director, screenwriter, and producer Ryōsuke Takahashi, video game designer Yūji Horii, and Akutagawa Prize-winning author Kazushige Abe. In 2006, Abe was replaced on the panel by novelist Kō Nakamura.

== Recipients ==
#	Year	Grand Prize	Honorable Mention
1	2001	Sekai Seifuku Monogatari: Yuma no Daibōken by Akira Kamishiro	D.I.Speed!! by Kyōsuke Sayama
2	2002	Ginban Kaleidoscope by Rei Kaibara	Chikatetsu Queen by Saki Azuma
3	2003	no prize given	1. Denpa Biyori by Kentarō Katayama; 2. Tono ga Kuru! by Masao Fukuda
4	2004	1. Tatakau Shisho to Koisuru Bakudan by Ishio Yamagata; 2. Sono Kamen o Hazushite by Hironobu Okazaki	Shadow & Light by Asami Kagena
5	2005	Kiiroi Hana no Aka by Asaura	Beurre Noisette by Riku Ranjō
6	2006	Iron Ball Princess Emily by Mazō Yanagita	1. Keikyoku Madōka Chilby-sensei by Tada Yokoyama; 2.Gun x School = Paradise! by Masahiro Homura
7	2007	no prize given	1. Chōningen Iwamura by Kenji Takikawa; 2. Sweets! by Yasuyuki Shinana; 3. Treasoner: Unmei no Kaekata by Shōta Yayoi
8	2008	by	1. - by 2. - by 3. - by
9	2009	by	1. - by 2. - by 3. - by
10	2010	by	1. - by 2. - by 3. - by
11	2011	by	1. - by 2. - by 3. - by
12	2012	by	1. - by 2. - by 3. - by
13	2013	TBD	1. TBD; 2. TBD; 3. TBD
