= Onmyō Taisenki =

Japanese multimedia franchise

- First volume cover

陰陽大戦記
- Genre: Adventure, supernatural
- Manga
- Written by: Yoshihiko Tomizawa
- Illustrated by: Hiroyuki Kaidō
- Published by: Shueisha
- Imprint: Jump Comics
- Magazine: V Jump
- Original run: November 19, 2003 – December 17, 2005
- Volumes: 3
- Anime television series
- Directed by: Masakazu Hishida
- Produced by: Norio Yamakawa; Teruaki Jitsumatsu; Yoichi Watanabe
- Written by: Katzuhiko Chiba; Junko Okazaki
- Music by: Yuko Fukushima
- Studio: Sunrise
- Original network: TXN (TV Tokyo)
- Original run: September 30, 2004 – September 29, 2005
- Episodes: 52
- icon

Onmyō Taisenki (陰陽大戦記) is a Japanese mixed-media project developed by WiZ and Bandai. A manga series, scripted by Yoshihiko Tomizawa and illustrated by Hiroyuki Kaidō, was serialized in Shueisha's V Jump magazine from November 2003 to December 2005, with its chapters collected in three tankōbon volumes. A 52-episode anime television series produced by Sunrise, NAS, and TV Tokyo, was broadcast from September 2004 to September 2005. Three video games were also released: one for Game Boy Advance in 2004 and two for the PlayStation 2 in 2005.

== Plot ==
Riku Tachibana is a 12-year-old boy who lives near Tokyo. Never having met his parents, he lives an ordinary life with his adoptive grandfather. His grandfather had taught him a series of strange hand movements, which Riku did not know the purpose of until the day his grandfather is attacked near his shrine. But it is not an ordinary attacker. The attacker is a shikigami (式神; lit. 'Ritual Gods'), strange monsters with human owners. Riku comes to the scene and that's where he first gets in contact with his Drive (神操機), the device he uses to call and make a 'contract' (契約, keiyaku) with Kogenta of the Byakko, his shikigami and, from that day on, best friend. The shikigami needs, for special attacks, a special series of Seal (印; In), one of which happens to be the strange hand movements Riku's grandfather always taught him.

As Riku's grandfather decides to leave the house for a journey, the 10-year-old boy Souma Asuka (飛鳥 ソーマ, Asuka Sōma) and the 10-year-old girl Nazuna (ナズナ) rent rooms in Riku's house. The 17-year-old man, Masaomi, who teaches Riku the secrets of Onmyōdō (such as the use of Tōjinfu, for example), drops by eventually. The three of them have "contracts" with shikigami. The main events of the series are related to the menace of the Chi-ryū (地流), a powerful Japanese financial group related to the Onmyōdō; attempting to open the four Yondaiten (四大天; lit. the 'Four Great Heavens'), and freeing Utsuho (ウツホ), a boy who was born with the power to control yōkai (妖怪), and had been imprisoned for thousands of years.

== Characters ==
Riku Tachibana (太刀花 リク, Tachibana Riku)
Voiced by: Jun Fukuyama
Riku was born in the Heian Era of Japan as Youmei. His mother sent him into the future, where he was taken up by Sōtarō Tachibana, to avoid dying in the Chi-Ryū raid on the Ten-Ryuu shrine. At the start of the series, he is shy and easily scared. But when he receives the Ten-Ryū Tōjin drive containing Kogenta, Kogenta helps him to become a lot braver and stronger. He has no memory of his time in the Heian era until he goes to Naraku to reunite with Kogenta after losing him by Yūma and Rangetsu. In Naraku, he sees his memory play in front of him, and learns of his past life. He is the head of the Ten-Ryū.
Kogenta (白虎のコゲンタ, Byakko no Kogenta)
Voiced by: Sayaka Aida
The shikigami of Riku Tachibana. Kogenta is a member of the Byakko (White Tiger) family of shikigami (leading many to the conclusion that Riku is Ten-Ryū's Head). He is typically cocky, arrogant, and quick to anger. At first he cannot believe that he is "stuck with someone as dimwitted" as Riku, but eventually comes to terms with this and tries to improve Riku's character. He is the first Shikigami to become a Daikōjin, but he considers it an unfair advantage because, in his words, "I cannot remember how I beat them and by the time I come to, the fight's already over." Later, Kogenta and Riku learned that Kogenta was the one who killed Riku's parents, but Kogenta could not remember as he became a Daikoujin the moment his contract was formed. However, Riku forgives Kogenta. In the finale, Kogenta willingly lets Riku terminate their contract, but in reality the contract still lingers, as Kogenta's spirit is seen over the shrine
Teru Saigō (西郷 テル, Saigō Teru)
Voiced by: Tomohiro Tsuboi
The first real member of the Ten-Ryū that Riku and Kogenta meet. Teru is broke, and nearly always in debt to someplace (a hot spring hotel, a beach bar, and others). He is always happy to receive free food (on account of him being unable to buy his own), and always travels as "Training" as he calls it, normally leaving as soon as someone tells him the rent for wherever he is staying. He even develops a crush on Nazuna, who shows him the literal meaning of "crush". He considers Souma a rival (as both love Nazuna), and only enters the Fukumaden as leader of the Yōkai Extermination Squad formed by Chi-Ryū.

== Media ==
=== Manga ===
A manga series, written by Yoshihiko Tomizawa and illustrated by Hiroyuki Kaidō, was serialized in Shueisha's V Jump from November 19, 2003, (Note: It started in the magazine's January 2004 issue, released on November 19, 2003.) to December 17, 2005. (Note: It finished in the magazine's February 2006 issue, released on December 17, 2005.) Shueisha collected its chapters in three tankōbon volumes, released from October 4, 2004, to March 3, 2006.

=== Anime ===
A 52-episode anime television series, produced by Sunrise, NAS, and TV Tokyo, was broadcast on TV Tokyo from September 30, 2004, to September 29, 2005. The opening theme song for the first 26 episodes is "Kimi to Nara" (君となら) by Suther Rand, while the second, used for the remaining episodes, is "Pulse" by Fake?. The ending theme song for the first 13 episodes is "Sora Kakeagaru" (空カケアガル) by Raico, the second, for episodes 14 to 26, is "Shiroi Fuyu" (白い冬), also by Raico, while the final ending theme for the remaining episodes is "Kimi ni Todoku Made" (君に届くまで) by Junko Yanagisawa.

==== Episode list ====
1. "God Descend! Byakko no Kogenta" (降神! 白虎のコゲンタ)
2. "Attack of the Chi-ryū" (地流強襲)
3. "Clash of the Byakko" (白虎激突)
4. "Strength of the Sword! Saikaidō Kotetsu" (剛剣!西海道虎鉄)
5. "Bight Between Dragons and Tigers" (竜虎激闘)
6. "Dance! Onmyōdō's Amulets" (舞え!闘神符)
7. "Invoke! Wave-Cutting Blade" (発動!怒涛斬魂剣)
8. "Yumma and Souma" (ユーマとソーマ)
9. "The Fighting Heart" (闘う心)
10. "Battle of the Mysterious Ancient Capital" (古都 神秘の戦い)
11. "Secret of The Ten-ryū Ruins" (天流遺跡の秘密)
12. "Ten-ryū and Chi-ryū shock, Daikoujin" (天地驚愕 大降神)
13. "The Bond Between Two People" (二人の絆)
14. "Demon Invasion" (伏魔殿侵入)
15. "Escape to the Kimon" (鬼門遁走)
16. "Return of the Assassin" (刺客再来)
17. "Byakko's Great Underwater Decisive Battle" (白虎水中大決戦)
18. "The Sealed Fortress" (城塞の封印)
19. "Fight to The Death at The Secret Hot Spring" (秘湯の死闘)
20. "The Terrifying Daikōjin" (戦慄の大降神)
21. "That name is Yakumo" (その名はヤクモ)
22. "Seal Engraved on the Heart" (心に刻まれた印)
23. "White Tiger Disappears" (白虎消失)
24. "The Past, Once Again" (再びの過去)
25. "Open, Zero Drive" (開放・零神操機)
26. "Northeast Opens" (大鬼門解放)
27. "End of the Season Madness" (節季凶乱)
28. "Quickenings of the Seal" (封印の胎動)
29. "Invitation to Enemy Territory" (敵地への招待)
30. "A man Racing to the 4 Kimon" (四鬼門に駆けた漢)
31. "Build Up Emotions" (重なる想い)
32. "Gold Rush at the Beach" (渚のゴールドラッシュ)
33. "A Reunion That Transcends Time" (時を越えた再会)
34. "Dragon and Tiger, Again" (龍虎、再び)
35. "The Price of Power" (力の代償)
36. "Stray Shikigami Koroku's Ordeal" (はぐれ式神 コロクの試練)
37. "Broken Trust" (砕かれた信頼)
38. "Falling Stars of Calamity" (凶星、流れる)
39. "Climactic Battle! Ten and Chi" (決戦!天と地と)
40. "Master Drive, Byakko Reborn" (極めし力 白虎新生)
41. "Utsuho Revives" (ウツホ復活)
42. "Awakening of the Blue" (蒼の覚醒)
43. "Dirtied Savior" (汚された救世主)
44. "Red Trap" (紅い罠)
45. "Burn Up! Sōma" (燃えろ!ソ－マ)
46. "Farewell, Yakumo" (さらば、ヤクモ)
47. "Fierce Attack of the Yondaiten" (四大天の猛攻)
48. "Qualifications to Be the Head" (宗家の資格)
49. "The End of a Dream" (夢の終わり)
50. "With Our Bonds At Stake" (絆をかけて)
51. "Demise of the Taikyoku" (終焉の太極)
52. "Among The Passing Seasons" (巡る節季の中で)

=== Video games ===
Onmyō Taisenki: Zeroshiki (陰陽大戦記 零式'; Onmyō Taisenki: Zero Ritual) was released the Game Boy Advance on December 9, 2004.

Onmyō Taisenki: Byakko Enbu (陰陽大戦記 白虎演舞; Onmyō Taisenki: Byakko Dance Performance) was released for the PlayStation 2 on March 31, 2005; the game required the EyeToy accessory.

Onmyō Taisenki: Hasha no In (陰陽大戦記 覇者の印; Onmyō Taisenki: The Champion's Seal) was released for the PlayStation 2 on June 23, 2005.
