= Ginban Kaleidoscope =

Japanese light novel series

- Cover of Ginban Kaleidoscope volume 1 as published by Shueisha featuring Tazusa Sakurano (bottom-left) and Pete Pumps (top-right).

銀盤カレイドスコープ (Ginban Kareidosukōpu)
- Genre: Drama, romantic comedy, sports (figure skating)
- Light novel
- Written by: Rei Kaibara
- Illustrated by: Hiro Suzuhira
- Published by: Shueisha
- Imprint: Super Dash Bunko
- Original run: 2003 – 2006
- Volumes: 9
- Manga
- Written by: Jun Hasegawa
- Published by: Shueisha
- Magazine: Margaret
- Original run: April 2005 – February 2006
- Volumes: 2
- Anime television series
- Directed by: Shinji Takamatsu
- Produced by: Yū Takahashi
- Written by: Akatsuki Yamatoya
- Music by: Kōichirō Kameyama
- Studio: Karaku
- Original network: TV Tokyo; TV Osaka; AT-X
- English network: SEA: Animax
- Original run: 8 October 2005 – 24 December 2005
- Episodes: 12

Ginban Kaleidoscope (Japanese: 銀盤カレイドスコープ, Hepburn: Ginban Kareidosukōpu; lit. Skating Rink Kaleidoscope) is a Japanese light novel series written by Rei Kaibara and illustrated by Hiro Suzuhira. A manga adaptation authored by Jun Hasegawa was serialized in Margaret from 2005 to 2006. An anime adaptation of the first arc of the novels aired on TV Tokyo from October 8, 2005, to December 24, 2005.

The series won the 2nd Super Dash Novel Rookie of the Year Award Grand Prize.

== Plot ==
The story revolves around Tazusa Sakurano, a Japanese Olympic figure skating candidate, and Pete Pumps, a Canadian stunt pilot. During a qualifying round in Montreal, Quebec, Canada, Tazusa falls in the middle of a Triple Lutz and loses consciousness. At the same time, Pete dies mid-performance when his stunt plane crashes due to mechanical trouble. Unfortunately for Tazusa, Pete ends up involuntarily inhabiting her body for 100 days. During this time, Tazusa begins to develop romantic feelings for Pete, and falls in love with him.

Tazusa Sakurano (桜野 タズサ, Sakurano Tazusa)
Voiced by: Ayako Kawasumi (Japanese); Emily Woo Zeller (English)
A Japanese figure skater known for her sharp tongue. She is on bad terms with the media and the public because of her cold attitude and string of bad luck in competitions. Her goal is to compete in the Winter Olympics in Torino (Turin, Italy). At the beginning of the series, she is possessed by the ghost of Pete Pumps and while she initially hated him, she gradually grew to accept his constant presence in her life and grew even more to love him.

While possessed, she picked up the habit of eating tomatoes, because her possessor Pete hates tomatoes, and using masochism, since Pete can share Tazusa's pain, to keep him in line. She has an unlucky tendency to fall asleep when she gets bored, but can never sleep the night before a competition. In the anime, she describes herself as "The 10 Billion Dollar Beauty."

Initially Tazusa is portrayed as a bratty, cold girl. She doesn't have many friends and lives with her coach and sister. However after spending time with Pete, she slowly changes and opens her heart. Especially in school where Pete helps her through her exams. She also starts to express herself more during the skating routines which enable her to represent Japan in the Olympics. At the same time, Tazusa also falls in love with Pete and she finally realizes what is truly important to her.

Pete Pumps (ピート・パンプス, Pīto Panpusu)
Voiced by: Hiroyuki Yoshino
A Canadian stunt pilot who died when his stunt plane developed mechanical trouble and crashed in a fireball. As a ghost he needs to wait 100 days before he can go to Heaven (his date of ascension is February 23) and inadvertently ends up possessing Tazusa.

Pete likes Tazusa and tries to help her improve her public image and succeed in being selected for the Olympics. He even gets jealous of the reporter Kazuya Nitta, as Tazusa seems to have a crush on him. Though Tazusa at first doesn't agree with him and ignores him, he eventually wins her over and she starts to get to know him better, and he designs her "waitress on ice" performance.

Sometimes, as a way to punish him for annoying her or for any other reason, she will eat tomatoes which he has a strong hatred for. It is the only way she can torture him without having any physical or mental pain inflicted upon her as well (aside from the digestive problems that come when she eats too many, and the embarrassment resulting from this).

At the first stage of performing at the Olympics Pete kisses Tazusa then during their last performance, Pete kisses her in his ghost form and seems to love her in return. He bids her an emotional farewell as he finally departs.

Kyōko Shitō (至藤響子, Shitō Kyōko)
Voiced by: Kazusa Murai
She is one of Tazusa's skating rivals. She is the preferred choice for the Japanese Olympic representative for Women's Figure Skating because she is closer to the Skating Federation's "ideal" and as such, she and Tazusa are quite competitive. She has a calm personality, and never likes to take risks.

Yūji Takashima (高島優司, Takashima Yūji)
Voiced by: Jurota Kosugi
He is Tazusa's coach. He is an all-around nice guy, always seeing the good aspects in everyone. Tazusa and her younger sister live with him because of their parents' divorce. In the beginning of the series, he had believed that the reason why Tazusa was hitting and torturing herself (although it was to hit and torture Pete) was due to stress of having Japan's representative figure skater in the Olympics being chosen soon. He also believes that whenever she is insulting Pete, it is he who is the target of her nasty remarks and also considers this as part of her stress. He reveals Hitomi as his fiancée on Episode 9.

Kazuya Nitta (新田一也, Nitta Kazuya)
Voiced by: Isshin Chiba
He is a freelance reporter who has a secret crush on Kyōko and tries to help Tazusa in her battles with the mass media. He is a calm and collected figure who believes in and supports Tazusa.

Yōko Sakurano (桜野ヨーコ, Sakurano Yōko)
Voiced by: Chiwa Saitō
She is Tazusa's level-headed younger sister. She is often seen waking Tazusa up for breakfast and in her competition to cheer her as well. In the novel series, she also figure skates.

Mika Honjō (本城ミカ, Honjō Mika)
Voiced by: Marina Inoue
She is Tazusa's quiet best friend and the designer of all of her skating outfits. A running gag in the anime consists of Tazusa yelling at Pete who is invisible to other people only to have Mika mistake the target of Tazusa's tirade as herself. Mika's voice actor also sings the ending theme of the anime series.

Yukie Mishiro (三代雪絵, Mishiro Yukie)
Voiced by: Hiroko Suzuki
She is an official from the Japan Skating Federation who claims that Tazusa has a "stone face." In return Tazusa calls her Queen Nasty or Sarcastic the Third. However, she does believe that Tazusa has special potential, which is why she pushes her so hard. In the final episode she recognizes the changes in Tazusa's personality as she breaks her "stone face" in her final routine. She hints that there's more to come from Tazusa, she has only begun.

Dominique Miller (ドミニク・ミラー, Dominiku Mirā)
Voiced by: Maya Okamoto
She is an American figure skater and one of Tazusa's rivals. She is very antagonistic towards Tazusa. She is notable in the anime mainly because all of her lines were in (badly accented) English.

Ria Garnet Juiltyve (リア・ガーネット・ジュイティエフ, Ria Gānetto Juiteifu)
Voiced by: Mamiko Noto
She is a world-class Russian figure skater and the favorite to win gold in at the Winter Olympics. As such, she is Tazusa's strongest rival. She also used the same song as Tazusa in episode 6, prompting her to revise her short program and shift to free jazz. She is a very quiet but dedicated figure skater worthy of her title.

== Media ==
=== Light novel ===
The series was written by Rei Kaihara and illustrated by Hiro Suzuhira. The series was published by Shueisha under the Super Dash Bunko imprint. The series won the Grand Prize in the 2nd Super Dash Novel Rookie of the Year Award. A total of 9 volumes were published.

(銀盤カレイドスコープ vol.1: ショート・プログラム: Road to dream)
Ginban Kaleidoscope Short Program: Road to dream (ISBN 4-08-630132-6)

- Release date: June 25, 2003

(銀盤カレイドスコープ vol．2: フリー・プログラム: Winner takes all?)
Ginban Kaleidoscope Free Program: Winner takes all? (ISBN 4-08-630133-4)

- Release date: June 25, 2003

(銀盤カレイドスコープ vol．3: ペア・プログラム: So shy too-too princess)
Ginban Kaleidoscope Pair Program: So shy too-too princess (ISBN 4-08-630167-9)

- Release date: January 23, 2004

(銀盤カレイドスコープ vol．4: リトル・プログラム: Big sister but sister)
Ginban Kaleidoscope Little Program: Big sister but sister (ISBN 4-08-630224-1)

- Release date: February 25, 2004

(銀盤カレイドスコープ vol．5: ルーキー・プログラム: Candy candy all my rules)
Ginban Kaleidoscope Rookie Program: Candy candy all my rules (ISBN 4-08-630255-1)

- Release date: September 22, 2005

(銀盤カレイドスコープ vol．6: ダブル・プログラム: A long, wrong time ago)
Ginban Kaleidoscope Double Program: A long, wrong time ago (ISBN 4-08-630267-5)

- Release date: November 25, 2005

(銀盤カレイドスコープ vol．7: リリカル・プログラム: Be in love with your miracle)
Ginban Kaleidoscope Lyrical Program: Be in love with your miracle (ISBN 4-08-630302-7)

- Release date: June 23, 2006

(銀銀盤カレイドスコープ vol．8: コズミック・プログラム: Big time again!)
Ginban Kaleidoscope Cosmic Program: Big time again! (ISBN 4-08-630326-4)

- Release date: November 25, 2006

(銀盤カレイドスコープ vol．9: シンデレラ・プログラム: Say it ain't so)
Ginban Kaleidoscope Cinderella Program: Say it ain't so (ISBN 4-08-630331-0)

- Release date: November 25, 2006

=== Manga ===
A manga adaptation by Jun Hasegawa was serialized in Margaret between the 18th issue of 2005 and the 10th issue of 2006. The individual chapters were later collected and published in two tankōbon volumes.

=== Anime ===
A 12-episode anime television series adaptation of Ginban Kaleidoscope produced by Actas aired in Japan between October 8, 2005, and December 24, 2005, on TV Tokyo. The series was directed by Shinji Takamatsu while the series composition done by Akatsuki Yamatoya.

The 12 episodes were later released into 6 separate DVD volumes with each volume containing 2 episodes. All the DVD volumes have both limited and normal editions. The covers for all the limited editions were drawn by series illustrator Hiro Suzuhira. The anime's opening theme is "Dual" by Yellow Generation while the ending theme is "Energy" by Marina Inoue.

== Reception ==
Melissa D. Johnson of T.H.E.M. Anime Reviews gave the series 5 out of 5 stars, saying that "Ginban Kaleidoscope is a beautiful coming of age story. It manages to pull off a complete story in only twelve episodes, yet somehow manages to create memorable characters where other titles twice or thrice as long keep serving up the cookie cut-outs."
