= Kanetake Ebikawa =

Japanese mechanical designer

- 海老川兼武
- Born: December 28, 1973 (age 52)
- Known for: Gundam
- Notable work: Gundam Build Fighters Try, Gundam 00
- Style: Animated mechanical design

Kanetake Ebikawa (海老川 兼武, Ebikawa Kanetake; born December 28, 1973) is an anime mechanical designer from Japan.

== Anime ==
- Blue Submarine No. 6 (1998, mechanical design, monitor graphics)
- Melty Lancer (1999, mechanical design)
- Gate Keepers (2000, monitor graphics)
- Vandread (2000, mechanical design)
- Vandread the second stage (2001, mechanical design)
- Zaion: I Wish You Were Here (2001, mechanical design, monitor graphics)
- Full Metal Panic! (2001, mechanical design, monitor graphics)
- Vandread Fetal Chapter (2001, mechanical design)
- Yukikaze (2002-2005, mechanical design, monitor graphics)
- Kiddy Grade (2002, mechanical design, monitor graphics)
- Vandread Battle Chapter (2002, mechanical design)
- The Animatrix (2003, cg (The Second Renaissance)
- Submarine 707R (2003, monitor graphics)
- Kimi ga Nozomu Eien (2003, mechanical design, monitor graphics)
- Fullmetal Alchemist (2003, special effects)
- Kurau Phantom Memory (2004, monitor graphics)
- Burst Angel (2004, mechanical design)
- Eureka Seven (2005, monitor graphics)
- Air (2005, mechanical design, setting assistance)
- Kirameki Project (2005, mechanical design, monitor graphics)
- Full Metal Panic! The Second Raid (2005, mechanical design)
- Saishū Heiki Kanojo Another love song (2005, monitor graphics)
- SoltyRei (2005-2006, mechanical design)
- Fullmetal Alchemist the Movie: Conqueror of Shamballa (2005, special effects)
- Origin: Spirits of the Past (2006, setting)
- Ouran High School Host Club (2006, episode 9 game graphics)
- Jyu-Oh-Sei (2006, episode 11 monitor graphics)
- Full Metal Panic! (2006, mechanical design of Lævatein)
- Full Metal Panic! The Second Raid Special OVA (2006, mechanical design)
- The Melancholy of Haruhi Suzumiya (2006, episode 11 mechanical design)
- Strain: Strategic Armored Infantry (2006-2007, mechanical design, monitor graphics)
- My-Otome Zwei (2006-2007, monitor graphics)
- Idolmaster: Xenoglossia (2007, monitor graphics)
- Kishin Taisen Gigantic Formula (2007, design works, Gigantic design, monitor graphics)
- Mobile Suit Gundam 00 (2007–2009, mechanical design, monitor graphics)
  - He was also involved with the colouring scheme design of Toyota Team Kraft's "Bandai 00 Dunlop SC430" (participating in 2007 Super GT season), which use the Gundam Exia's colouring scheme with the logo of the anime.
- Kiddy Girl-and (2009-2010, mechanical design)
- Model Suit Gunpla Builders Beginning G (2010, mechanical design)
- Mobile Suit Gundam 00 the Movie: A Wakening of the Trailblazer (2010, mechanical design)
- Mobile Suit Gundam AGE (2011-2012, mechanical design, key animation (ep. 49), monitor graphics)
- Waiting in the Summer (2012, mechanical design)
- Eureka Seven: AO (2012, mechanical designer, monitor graphics)
- Gundam Build Fighters (2013, mechanical design)
- Gundam Build Fighters Try (2014, mechanical design)
- Concrete Revolutio (2015, SF concept design)
- Gundam Build Fighters Try Island Wars (2016, mechanical design)
- The Bugle Call: Song of War (2027, concept design)

== Novels ==
- Full Metal Panic! (1998, mechanical design)
- Eighty Elite (2003, mechanical design)
- Full Metal Panic!: Another (2011, mechanical design)

== Games ==
- The Super Dimension Fortress Macross: Do You Remember Love? (1997, monitor graphics, special effects)
- Macross VF-X2 (1999, monitor graphics)
- Blue Submarine No. 6: Saigetsu Fumahito Time and Tide (2000, mechanical design, monitor graphics)
- Dariusburst (2009, mechanical design)
- Alice Gear Aegis (2018)
