= The Bugle Call: Song of War =

Japanese manga series

- First tankōbon volume cover

戦奏教室 (Sensō Kyōshitsu)
- Genre: Dark fantasy; Military
- Manga
- Written by: Mozuku Sora
- Illustrated by: Higoro Toumori
- Published by: Shueisha
- English publisher: NA: Viz Media
- Imprint: Jump Comics SQ.
- Magazine: Jump Square; (June 3, 2022 – April 3, 2026); Jump SQ. Rise; (July 30, 2026 – present)
- Original run: June 3, 2022 – present
- Volumes: 14
- Anime television series
- Directed by: Shinya Watada
- Written by: Michiro Tsuchiya
- Music by: Hitomi Kotō
- Studio: CA Soa (Note: Animation Production (アニメーション制作)); Shirogumi (Note: CG Animation Production (CGアニメーション制作))
- Original run: 2027 – scheduled
- icon

The Bugle Call: Song of War (Japanese: 戦奏教室, Hepburn: Sensō Kyōshitsu) is a Japanese manga series written by Mozuku Sora and illustrated by Higoro Toumori. It began serialization in Shueisha's Jump Square magazine in June 2022. As of July 2026, fourteen volumes have been released. An anime television series adaptation produced by CA Soa (with CG animation by Shirogumi) is set to premiere in 2027.

== Plot ==
=== Setting ===
There are nine spires scattered across the land which contain relics and technology from an ancient, advanced civilization beyond the craftsmanship of the current day. The two greatest spires are controlled by the Papal States and the Erin Empire, who wage war over control of the other spires.

Humans born with branches sticking out of their heads are called Branched and each possesses a unique power such as invisibility or supernatural luck. The Branched cannot use their powers outside of a spires field of influence and will eventually die if they remain outside. In some nations, Branched are well-known while in others they are kept secret.

=== Premise ===
Luca was raised among a band of mercenaries since he was an infant, but he hates the life. He is recruited by the Pontiff in his war against the Erin Empire in exchange for support of his dream of becoming a maestro. Part of their deal consists of Luca killing the Garland, a powerful Branched that can destroy nations.

== Characters ==
=== Papal States ===
==== Luca's Branched Team ====
Luca (リュカ, Ryuka)
A 14-year-old Branched. He was raised by a band of mercenaries, where he served as their bugler. After being saved by the Pontiff, he agrees to become the leader of the Papal States' Branched, in exchange for help in achieving his dream of becoming a maestro. He's developed feelings for Zoe. His power allows him to turn sound into light, which he uses in battle to command troops.
Zoe (ゾーイ, Zōi)
A Branched under Luca's command and the Papal States' trump card. She has a mutual affection for Luca. She believes the Pontiff is her mother. Her power allows her to obtain her future self's strength, but she falls asleep afterwards as a consequence. She is 27-years-old but has the mind of a 9-year-old due to overuse of her power.
Demi (デミ)
A Branched under Luca's command. Her power gives her exceptional eyesight that she can share with others.
Miura (ミウラ)
A Branched under Luca's command. His power allows him to run incredibly fast, though, because of the high speed, he cannot see where he is going.
Poppy (ポピー, Popī)
A Branched under Luca's command. Her power gives her telekinesis. Her telekinesis is very weak but has a large radius, allowing her to use a bow and arrow to hit enemies at a distance with high accuracy.
Cora (コーラ, Kōra)
A Branched under Luca's command. Her power allows her to transfer injuries between herself and another person. She primarily serves as a medic.
Oskar (オスカー, Osukā)
A Branched under Luca's command. He and Zahid have been friends since childhood. He is fanatically devoted to the Pontiff, who brought his younger sister back to life. His power grants him immortality, capable of healing from any wound, including decapitation.
Zahid (ザヒード, Zahīdo)
A Branched under Luca's command. Born to a traveling merchant, he often visited Oskar's village, with whom he became friends. His power gives him supernatural luck.
Udo (ウード, Ūdo)
A pragmatic and flirtatious Branched mercenary who joins the Branched Squad on their campaign to the Land of Thralls on the hunt for the Garland and the Doppelganger. He has the ability to manipulate blood and is skeptical of Luca's ability to lead others into battle.

==== Government ====
The Pontiff (教皇, Kyōkō)
The manipulative and exploitative leader of the Papal States and of the Spirism faith.
Pietro (ピエトロ, Pietoro)
Pietro is the devout Imperator of the Holy Realm's military forces. He answers directly to the Pontiff.

==== Other Characters ====
Gerhart (ゲルハルト, Geruharuto)
The eader of a band of mercenaries and Luca's adoptive father, who put faith in his dream of being a musician.
Colin ((コリン, Korin)
Colin is Gerhart's second-in-command with little aspirations to overcome the mercenary life.
Zoe's mother
The mother of Zoe was the only parental figure in her early life, raising her alongside her in captivity. Following Zoe's recruitment into the Holy Realm, the Pontiff assumed her likeness and voice, continuing to guide Zoe as a soldier.
Hanna (ハンナ, Han'na)
Hanna is the 9-year old sister of Oskar, who he spends most of his free time with.
Cyril (シリル, Shiriru)
Cyril is Demi's cheerful younger brother, who grew up on a plantation alongside his sister.
Jen (ジェン)
Jen is a 12-year old restless Serf who worked on the plantation where Demi grew up on.
Maxim (マキシム, Maximu)
Maxim is a kind young Serf on a plantation and Jen's older brother.

=== Erin Empire ===
Kayano (カヤノ)
A 13-year-old Branched capable of destroying whole nations, feared as The Garland Branched (花冠の枝憑き, Kakan no Edatsuki). Her power allows her to summon a meteor on a target.
Akira (アキラ)
He is the father of the Garland who accompanies her on her travels across the continent. He is a mysterious and powerful individual capable of fighting against Branched warriors despite not being one himself. He has foresight and enhanced strength and reflexes.
The Mikado (ミカド)
The Mikado is the ruler of the Erin Empire and the primary opponent to the Holy Realm in the War of Spires, as well as Kayano's adoptive mother.
Théodore (テオドール, Teodōru)
Théodore is the Doppelganger Branched, the third son of the late Duke of Normandy and the primary source of the Duchy's slave exports. After the Garland destroyed his country, the Doppelganger allied himself with the Empire and now provides them with the bulk of their military using his Duplicate soldiers. His ability of replication allows him to create near-identical, autonomous duplicates of himself from discarded parts of his body, most commonly strands of his hair.
Carl (カール, Kāru)
Carl is a prideful Branched commander of the Erin Empire's army. His power allows him to control metal and magnetic forces.
Sarah (サラ, Sara)
Sarah is a reserved and quiet Branched soldier in service to the Erin Empire, partnered with Carl. She possesses the ability to change the effective weight of objects and people, most notably applying it to projectiles such as arrows to amplify their destructive force.
Thames (テム, Temu)
Thames is a cynical Branched soldier of the Erin Empire. He has a degree of superhuman strength and seems to possess the reflexive ability to "slow down" objects that come dangerously close to him.
Mira (ミラ)
Mira is one of the Branched who serve the Erin Empire. He has the ability to switch places of individuals and does not enjoy fighting himself.

=== Kingdom of Gallia ===
The Looking Glass Branched (鏡面の枝付き, Kyōmen no Edatsuki)
A powerful Branched initially serving Gallia as a soldier, before taking the country over. Her power allows her to create a spatial connection between mirrors, no matter how large or small.
Francis (フランシス, Furanshisu)
Francis is the somber and tired King of Gallia, which he has ruled for nearly a thousand years.
Catherine (カトリーヌ, Katorīnu)
Catherine is the daughter of the Looking Glass who is said to have been killed along with her husband prior to her disappearance from the Land of Mirrors.
Guillaume (ギョーム, Gyōmu)
Guillaume is the Branched Commander of the Royalist faction in the Land of Mirrors. He has the ability to compress the air molecules at his hands and form them into weapons.

=== Germania ===
Meryl (ネリル, Neriru)
Meryl is the caretaker of the Skyfall Branched and a Branched woman who has assumed the identity of Camilla (カミラ, Kamira), the Skyfall's former lover. Meryl generates and manipulates an ash-like substance that can be formed into durable physical constructs.
The Skyfall Branched (天に落ちる 枝憑き, Ten ni ochiru Edatsuki)
The Skyfall Branched is a legendary Branched warrior from the nation of Germania known for his destructive prowess in battle despite his advanced age. His power allows him to manipulate gravity, capable of altering both the direction and intensity of gravitational forces, most commonly applying them to himself or his weapon in order to propel his body through the air at tremendous speeds. During combat, this manifests as a series of sudden "falls" toward his target, allowing him to accelerate and strike with devastating force despite his advanced age and frail physique.

== Media ==
=== Manga ===
Written by Mozuku Sora and illustrated by Higoro Toumori, the manga began serialization in Shueisha's Jump Square magazine on June 3, 2022. In September 2025, it was announced that the series would be entering its final battle. In April 2026, it was announced that the series would be transferred to the Jump SQ. Rise magazine beginning in the Summer 2026 issue. As of July 2026, the series' individual chapters have been collected into fourteen tankōbon volumes.

In October 2024, Viz Media announced that they licensed the series for English publication.

==== Volumes ====
| No. | Original release date | Original ISBN | English release date | English ISBN |
|---|---|---|---|---|
| 1 | September 2, 2022 | 978-4-08-883236-4 | June 3, 2025 | 978-1-9747-5259-1 |
1. "Dreams of Sound" (夢見る音, Yumemiru Oto); 2. "The Two Great Spires" (二つの主塔, Futatsu no Shutō); 3. "Marching" (マーチング, Māchingu)
Luca is recruited by the Pontiff following a battle where he uses his powers for the first time to conduct a successful retreat. To assess his abilities, the Pontiff tasks Luca with eliminating enemies that have gathered outside the city gates of Thermi. The Pontiff makes Luca captain of the Branched and wants him to assist in his war against the Erin Empire and in killing the Garland, a powerful Branched. In return, Luca demands he be allowed to quit afterwards and become a maestro. The next day, Luca strikes up a friendship with Miura, a fellow Branched. After an abandoned fort was occupied by bandits, Luca leads Miura to recapture the fort.
| 2 | January 4, 2023 | 978-4-08-883344-6 | August 5, 2025 | 978-1-9747-5609-4 |
4. "First Campaign" (はじめての遠征, Hajimete no Ensei); 5. "The Battle of Fort Cannoli (Part 1)" (カンノーリ城の戦い➀, Kannōri-jō no Tatakai (1)); 6. "The Battle of Fort Cannoli (Part 2)" (カンノーリ城の戦い➁, Kannōri-jō no Tatakai (2)); 7. "Shining Far Off in the Night Sky" (夜空の奥で光るもの, Yozora no Oku de Hikaru Mono)
In their first proper campaign together, Luca and the Branched squad set out to intercept an Imperial army at Fort Cannoli. During the march, Luca repels an enemy ambush and takes the opportunity to learn more about his fellow Branched. At Fort Cannoli, Zoe defeats an enemy Branched in combat, forcing him to withdraw, while Miura captures another enemy Branched, securing a victory for the Papal States. However, that night Fort Cannoli and the surrounding countryside is destroyed by the Garland Branched. Two days later, in Thermi, the Branched squad celebrate their victory with a party. Seeing the good that still exists in the world, Luca begins to reconsider his outlook on life and becomes determined to defeat the Garland.
| 3 | April 4, 2023 | 978-4-08-883515-0 | October 7, 2025 | 978-1-9747-5823-4 |
8. "Flower Ring" (フラワーリング, Furawā Ringu); 9. "House of Mirrors" (鏡の家, Kagami no Ie); 10. "Weather Report" (ウェザーリポート, Wezā Ripōto)
| 4 | July 4, 2023 | 978-4-08-883570-9 | December 2, 2025 | 978-1-9747-5824-1 |
11. "Boy Meets Lady" (ボーイ・ミーツ・レディ, Bōi Mītsu Redi); 12. "A Pitiable Emptiness" (愛しい空っぽ, Itoshī Karappo); 13. "Flowering" (フラワリング, Furawaringu)
| 5 | October 4, 2023 | 978-4-08-883673-7 | February 3, 2026 | 978-1-9747-6175-3 |
14. "Career Hopes" (進路希望, Shinro Kibō); 15. "Off to the Land of Thralls" (奴隷の国へ, Dorei no Kuni e); 16. "Domain of the Doppelgangers" (複命たちの国, Fukumeitachi no Kuni)
| 6 | February 2, 2024 | 978-4-08-883778-9 | April 7, 2026 | 978-1-9747-6176-0 |
17. Spiredom of War (戦争教区, Sensō Kyōku); Side Story 1 (番外編1, Bangaihen Ichi); 18. Shelter from the Rain (雨宿り, Amayadori); 19. Sounding the Dream (音見る夢, Otomiru Yume)
| 7 | June 4, 2024 | 978-4-08-884027-7 | June 2, 2026 | 978-1-9747-6360-3 |
20. "The Branched Who Falls Toward Heaven" (天に落ちる枝憑き, Ten ni Ochiru Edatsuki); 21. "Duel at Mount Tombe" (モン・トンブ城決戦, Mon Tonbu-jō Kessen); 22. "One of Ten Thousand" (1万分の1, Ichi Manbun no Ichi); 23. "Ticket to Ride" (乗車権, Jōshaken)
| 8 | September 4, 2024 | 978-4-08-884182-3 | August 4, 2026 | 978-1-9747-6518-8 |
24. "War Game" (ウォーゲーム, Wō Gēmu); 25. "Rite of Passage" (通過儀礼, Tsūkagirei); 26. "A Cell Until Coming of Age" (大人になるまで住まう部屋, Otona ni Naru Made Sumau Heya)
| 9 | January 4, 2025 | 978-4-08-884324-7 | October 6, 2026 | 978-1-9747-6540-9 |
27. "Modern Times" (モダンタイムス, Modan Taimusu); 28. "Happy"; 29. "Zoe's World" (ゾーイの世界, Zōi no Sekai)
| 10 | April 4, 2025 | 978-4-08-884421-3 | December 1, 2026 | 978-1-9747-6559-1 |
30. Oshie no Kuni (教えの国); 31. Miraijin no Mura (未来人の村); 32. Kyōdōtai (共同体)
| 11 | July 4, 2025 | 978-4-08-884586-9 | February 2, 2027 | 978-1-9747-1645-6 |
33. Riaritī Shō (リアリティーショー); 34. "Sweet Dreams"; 35. Nichijō Bibōroku (日常備忘録)
| 12 | October 3, 2025 | 978-4-08-884709-2 | — | — |
36. Ichiban Nagai Hi (いちばん長い日); 37. Yūgure (夕暮れ); 38. Yozora no Shita de Hiraku Mono (夜空の下で開くもの)
| 13 | February 4, 2026 | 978-4-08-884821-1 | — | — |
39. Fuyu Kitaru (冬来る); 40. Tokeijikake no Ki (時計じかけの木); 41. Tsunagari no Kuni (繋がりの国)
| 14 | July 3, 2026 | 978-4-08-885045-0 | — | — |
42 "fire sign"; 43 Chiisana Fune (小さな船); 44 "This is a life"

=== Anime ===
An anime television series adaptation was announced on June 30, 2026. It is directed by Shinya Watada, with animation produced by CA Soa, CG animation produced by Shirogumi, scripts written by Michiro Tsuchiya, character designs by Michinori Chiba, music composed by Hitomi Kotō, and concept design by Kanetake Ebikawa. The series is set to premiere in 2027.

== Reception ==
The reception of The Bugle Call: Song of War has been largely positive, with critics praising its innovative magic system, detailed artwork, and its blend of historical and dark fantasy elements. Screen Rant included the manga in its list of the "10 Best New-Gen Manga to Read in 2026." It was also recommended by Makoto Yukimura, the creator of Vinland Saga.

The narrative and characters were well received by critics. Kara Dennison of Otaku USA described it as a "surprisingly inspirational and hopeful story." Mida of Scorpio Books noted that the ability to "see" music keeps the pacing "sharp and quick" while maintaining the emotional weight of the lives lost in war. Kerstin of Walt's Comic Shop, however, noted an abrupt tonal shift in the first volume, causing the narrative to "lose some focus in the middle." Some found Luca a relatable and likable character while others found him to be unlikable though intriguing.

The worldbuilding was generally favorably received, though some critics found the setting unoriginal. The series' worldbuilding and tone have been compared to other dark fantasy works, such as Berserk and Vinland Saga. Kerstin noted that while "inspirations from Vinland Saga and Berserk are apparent", the world is "carefully constructed."

Higoro Toumori's artwork has received significant acclaim. Kerstin described the depictions of Luca's power as "particularly striking" and Dennison called the art "gorgeous."
