= Ben-To =

Japanese light novel series

- Cover of Ben-To volume 1 featuring Sen Yarizui

ベン・トー (Ben Tō)
- Genre: Action, comedy, harem
- Light novel
- Written by: Asaura
- Illustrated by: Kaito Shibano
- Published by: Shueisha
- Imprint: Super Dash Bunko
- Original run: February 22, 2008 – February 25, 2014
- Volumes: 15
- Manga

Ben-To Zero: Road to Witch
- Written by: Asaura
- Illustrated by: Kaito Shibano
- Published by: Shueisha
- Magazine: Super Dash Manga Program (Jump Square)
- Original run: April 21, 2011 – October 2011
- Volumes: 1
- Anime television series
- Directed by: Shin Itagaki
- Produced by: Satoshi Adachi; Kazuhiro Kanemitsu; Koji Kajita; Takashi Takano; Tatsuya Ishiguro
- Written by: Kazuyuki Fudeyasu
- Music by: Taku Iwasaki
- Studio: David Production
- Licensed by: Crunchyroll (streaming)
- Original network: TVA, MBS, tvk, Animax, AT-X
- English network: US: Funimation Channel
- Original run: October 9, 2011 – December 25, 2011
- Episodes: 12
- Manga

Ben-To Another: Ripper's Night
- Written by: Asaura
- Illustrated by: Kaito Shibano
- Published by: Shueisha
- Magazine: Super Dash & Go!
- Original run: December 2011 – October 2012
- Volumes: 1
- Manga

Ben-To Sankakkei
- Written by: Asaura
- Illustrated by: Sankaku Head
- Published by: Shueisha
- Magazine: Super Dash & Go!
- Original run: October 2012 – June 2013
- Volumes: 1
- Manga

Ben-To A La Carte
- Written by: Asaura
- Illustrated by: Kaito Shibano
- Published by: Shueisha
- Magazine: Super Dash & Go!
- Original run: December 2012 – June 2013
- Volumes: 1

Ben-To (ベン・トー, Ben Tō) is a Japanese light novel series written by Asaura, with illustrations by Kaito Shibano. Shueisha published 15 novels from February 2008 to February 2014. Shibano also illustrates three manga adaptations, and a fourth manga is drawn by Sankaku Head. A 12-episode anime television series adaptation produced by David Production aired in Japan between October and December 2011. Funimation has licensed the anime in North America.

== Plot ==
While innocently reaching for some half-priced bento, Yō Satō finds himself beaten up on the floor of a supermarket. He soon learns that getting half-priced bento is an all-out brawl between customers. Yō is invited to the Half-Priced Food Lovers Club by one of the top fighters, Sen Yarizui, in order to train to compete in these battles.

=== Bento brawls ===
Bento brawls are big, all-out, free for all battles for half-priced bento boxes, where victors are decided by who claims the bento first. The brawls are governed by a set of unspoken rules among the brawlers, mainly to keep each brawl fair and even.

- Every brawler must wait away from the bento area until the God of Discounts, the ones who put the half-price sticker on the bento boxes, puts the sticker on the bento boxes and leave to the break room before beginning to battle. To take one beforehand and to harass the God of Discounts is disrespectful, as the last thing they need at the end of their shift are people harassing them for their discount.
- If another brawler manages to get a bento for themselves, they cannot be attacked. If two or more brawlers get their hands on the same bento, then they fight among themselves until the other lets go of the bento.
- A brawler can only take one bento, to take another would be greedy and would spoil the victory for another.
- Brawlers should never do anything to cause a bento to spill, doing that would mean one less bento for someone to get.

Aside from that, whatever methods one can use in obtaining a bento can be used from simply brawling to using baskets and chopsticks as weapons, even running around avoiding fights altogether, are valid strategies. Sometimes brawlers fight in groups, such as the Half-Priced Food Lovers Club (Yō, Sen and sometimes Hana) and the Orthros pair who will often fight with each other while going after separate bento or team up to take out a threat before brawling with each other.

Those that fight for bento boxes are often known as "wolves". Inexperienced bento brawlers are considered "dogs", usually considered as such when they do not understand the essence of bento brawls and use tactics that are looked down upon. Those that go against the rules and will selfishly go after bento and harass the staff are known as "boars" and have no respect among brawlers. Bento brawlers will often do everything in their power to stop boars from obtaining bento, as they go against everything brawlers stand for, and thus do not deserve the bento. Strong and notable brawlers are often given titles (which are usually associated with personality or appearance), though how they get their titles (and in the case of Yō, the title itself) is usually less than impressive.

== Characters ==
Yō Satō (佐藤 洋, Satō Yō)
Voiced by: Hiro Shimono (Japanese); Austin Tindle (English)
The protagonist, a high school freshman who finds himself dragged into the battle for half-priced bento. He enjoys playing retro video games, particularly Sega Saturn games. Though at first shown not able to even hold his ground in a bento brawl, he soon shows remarkable strength, enough to be recognized as an equal by Yū, the Wizard, and win a one-on-one fight against Ayame. Following a particularly embarrassing incident, he ends up stuck with the title of Pervert (変態, Hentai), which, coincidentally, fits his own personality; Ayame reveals several porn magazines in his room (given to him by a classmate named Uchimoto), and hints that this habit of reading them started at a young age. Therefore, he often fantasizes about girls (usually Sen, whom he has a crush on), but despite his perverted behaviour, most of the female characters seem to have developed feelings for him (Ayame, Hana, the older Sawagi twin, Asebi, and even Sen), even if it is somewhat comedic (like Hana or Asebi). He also has somewhat of a S&M relationship with his class representative, Ume (as perceived by his perverted classmate (Uchimoto again)), however, really she just beats him up because of her crush on Hana who Yo hangs out with a lot (mainly because of the Bento Brawls). Nonetheless, he is able to focus on the task at hand and do what he is asked to do.

Sen Yarizui (槍水 仙, Yarizui Sen)
Voiced by: Mariya Ise (Japanese); Trina Nishimura (English)
A second year student who is the current president (and initially, the only remaining member) of the Half Priced Food Lovers Club. She is one of the strongest wolves of the west, leading her to be known as the Ice Witch (氷結の魔女, Hyōketsu no Majo). Her title comes from her accidentally almost buying a chūhai called Freezing (氷結, Hyōketsu) because she liked the design and assumed it was a normal drink, in addition to it being on sale. While usually calm, she's very innocent and does not particularly know a lot outside of bento brawls and can sometimes be pretty clumsy. She can be very stubborn as well, especially when it involves a challenge from another wolf. Sen, however, does have a good heart, preferring not to judge people by appearances or hold any grudges. She doesn't seem to have any dislikes, besides bento brawlers who do not follow the rules and boys who ignore girls that have been hurt. Despite Yō having many fantasies of Sen, she appears to be oblivious to this particular side of him. Regardless, she cares for his well-being and often shares bento with him, hinting that she may like him.

Ayame Shaga (著莪 あやめ, Shaga Ayame)
Voiced by: Emiri Katō (Japanese); Morgan Garrett (English)
Yō's half-Italian cousin. Like Yō, she is an avid gamer, and enjoys flirting with him and occasionally Hana. She is also a wolf known as the Beauty by the Lake (湖の麗人, Mizuumi no Reijin), named so after eating a bento on a bench at a park called Lake Park and ended up falling asleep there. She is well known for using chopsticks in battle. Her personality varies depending on her mood; normally, she is very out-going, and loves toying with Yō, but if she is hurt, she becomes very sensitive and harsh against him and Sen, much preferring to have Yō eat with her or be alone at that point. She often goes scouting out other wolves and usually hangs out with Yō and Sen, whom she shares a friendly rivalry with.

Hana Oshiroi (白粉 花, Oshiroi Hana)
Voiced by: Aoi Yūki (Japanese); Felecia Angelle (English)
An easily excitable girl who joins the Half Priced Food Lovers Club. Her hobby is writing yaoi erotic novels, having its characters inspired on other wolves. Not a fighter type at all, Hana usually resorts to sneaking past the other wolves, while they are fighting, to grab a bento for herself, which works most of the time. People used to bully her and get mad if she even touched them, saying that she has germs and will infect them, until she began to frantically apologize to anyone she touches and try to clean them up after the "contamination". Since meeting Sen and Yō, that behaviour has gradually changed and eventually, it no longer occurred.

Ume Shiraume (白梅 梅, Shiraume Ume)
Voiced by: Ai Kayano (Japanese); Tia Ballard (English)
The student council president of Yō's school (and class representative of Yō's class) who has a perverted obsession with Hana and usually beats Yō up out of jealousy, despite also being prone to flirt with other girls like Ayame. She often asks if it is all right for her to get irritated or hit a person immediately after doing so.

Yū Kaneshiro (金城 優, Kaneshiro Yū)
Voiced by: Mamoru Miyano (Japanese); Marcus D. Stimac (English)
A third year student and a veteran wolf who is known as the Wizard (ウィザード, Wizādo). A year before the events of the story, he was the president of the Half Priced Food Lovers Club, and personally taught Sen the rules of bento brawling.

Asebi Inoue (井ノ上 あせび, Inoue Asebi)
Voiced by: Ayana Taketatsu (Japanese); Lindsay Seidel (English)
A schoolmate of Ayame who is also in the gaming club at their school. She is cursed with extreme bad luck which spreads to anybody she touches (usually Yō), though she is oblivious to her curse and has a happy-go-lucky and childlike personality otherwise. She always has a cold so she is often seen wearing a scarf and hat. It is hinted she might have feelings for Yō, making him cookies and a bento (with unlucky results).

Ren Nikaidou (二階堂 連, Nikaidō Ren)
Voiced by: Kazuyuki Okitsu (Japanese); Ian Sinclair (English)
A wolf who was once the head of a group known as the Gabriel Ratchet. After a strong showing from Yō, he declared him as his rival, though has a lot of problems when associating with him, especially because of the incident where Yō got the nickname of pervert which he personally helped spread. Despite being unwilling to have anything to do with Yō, he is somewhat similar to him in personality and preference; he has a crush on Matsuba (as Yō does with Sen) and often blushes whenever an awkward situation is presented to him (just as Yō does when he starts fantasizing). He often associates himself with Ayame as they are from the same area and will usually work with her to gather information about other wolves. Despite being a noteworthy wolf, he has yet to gain a proper nickname.

Kyō Sawagi (沢桔 梗, Sawagi Kyō) and Kyō Sawagi (沢桔 鏡, Sawagi Kyō)
Voiced by: Yukari Tamura and Yui Horie (Japanese); Kara Edwards and Anastasia Muñoz (English)
A pair of twin sisters who are the respective Student Council President and Vice President of Ayame's school. Their names sound identical but spelled with different kanji; the elder twin is named with the kanji for 'bellflower' while the younger twin is named with the kanji for 'mirror'. Together, they form a fearsome bento brawling combo known as Orthrus (オルトロス, Orutorosu), using shopping baskets to overwhelm their opponents with darkness and beat them so badly that they don't remember who attacked them. Before the start of the story, they were inspired to become bento brawlers after witnessing one at such a young age and became one of the strongest bento brawlers until a manipulative brawler known as the Club of Hercules made a deal with the other local wolves to simply let them pass by, thus taking the fun out of the brawls. Due to this, they lost all desire to continue until three years later, after they try to get a look of Sen in the hospital, when it was Yō who was hospitalized, not Sen.

Goatee (顎鬚, Ago Hige)
Voiced by: Tomoyuki Higuchi (Japanese); Scott Freeman (English)

Monk (坊主, Bōzu)
Voiced by: Ryokichi Takahashi (Japanese); Tyson Rinehart (English)

Brunette (茶髪, Chapatsu)
Voiced by: Eriko Nakamura

Kiku Matsuba (松葉 菊, Matsuba Kiku)
Voiced by: Sayaka Ohara (Japanese); Caitlin Glass (English)

Tomoaki Yamahara (山原 知昭, Yamahara Tomoaki)
Voiced by: Nobuhiko Okamoto (Japanese); Josh Grelle (English)

Hiroaki Uchimoto (内本 宏明, Uchimoto Hiroaki)
Voiced by: Yūichi Iguchi (Japanese); Keith Kubal (English)

Hercules (ヘラクレス, Herakuresu)
Voiced by: Akira Ishida (Japanese); Clifford Chapin (English)

== Media ==
=== Light novels ===
Ben-To began as a light novel series written by Asaura (アサウラ), with illustrations by Kaito Shibano. Shueisha published 15 volumes between February 22, 2008, and February 25, 2014, under Shueisha's Super Dash Bunko imprint; 12 comprise the main story, while the other three are short story collections. Other short stories were published online on Super Dash Bunko's official website and in Super Dash Manga Program, a separate volume included with Shueisha's Jump Square manga magazine.

=== Manga ===
A manga adaptation, illustrated by Kaito Shibano and titled Ben-To Zero: Road to Witch, serialized five chapters between the first issue of Super Dash Manga Program, included with the combined May/June 2011 issue of Jump Square sold on April 21, 2011, and the issue included with the October 2011 issue of Jump Square. A single tankōbon volume was released on October 25, 2011. Another manga, also illustrated by Shibano and titled Ben-To Another: Ripper's Night, was serialized between the December 2011 and October 2012 issues of Shueisha's Super Dash & Go! magazine. A single volume of Ben-To Another was released on October 25, 2012. A third manga illustrated by Shibano, titled Ben-To A La Carte (ベン・トー アラカルト), was serialized between the December 2012 and June 2013 issues of Super Dash & Go!. A single volume of Ben-To A La Carte was released on November 22, 2013. Another manga adaptation, illustrated by Sankaku Head and titled Ben-To Sankakkei, was serialized between the October 2012 and June 2013 issues of Super Dash & Go!.

=== Anime ===
A 12-episode anime television series adaptation produced by David Production and directed by Shin Itagaki aired in Japan between October 9, 2011, and December 25, 2011, on TV Aichi. The main opening theme is "Live for Life: Ōkamitachi no Yoru" (LIVE for LIFE 〜狼たちの夜〜, LIVE for LIFE ~Night of the Wolves~) by Aimi, while the ending theme is "Egao no Hōsoku" (笑顔の法則, The Rules of Smiling) by Mariya Ise. The opening theme for episode four is "Treasure!" by Emiri Katō. The anime series was originally licensed and streamed by Funimation in North America.

==== Episode list ====
No.	Title	Original release date
1	"Be Sticky, Natto Okra Rice Bowl Dish with Cheese Topping Bento 440kcal" "Nebare, Nattō Okura Don Bukkake Chīzu Toppingu Bentō Yonhyakuyonjū Kiro Karorī" (Japanese: ネバれ、納豆オクラ丼ぶっかけチーズトッピング弁当 440kcal)	October 9, 2011
Yō Satō finds himself beaten up on the supermarket floor, the last thing he remembers being going to get some half-priced bento. The next day, he encounters a silver haired girl who warns him not to go to the store again. He goes again alongside another student, Hana Oshiroi, and finds himself beaten up again upon reaching for the half price bento. The next day, he decides to act more strategically and witnesses an all-out battle for the bento that gets marked half-price, which is dominated by the silver haired girl, Sen Yarizui. After the battle ends in total defeat for Yō, Sen tells him to come to the Half-Priced Food Lovers club room.
2	"Mackerel Boiled in Miso Bento 674kcal" "Saba no Misoni Bentō Roppyakunanajūyon Kiro Karorī" (Japanese: サバの味噌煮弁当 674kcal)	October 16, 2011
Sen gets Yō and Hana to join the Half-Priced Food Lovers Club and starts training them in the ways of Bento Brawling. During one of the supermarket visits, they encounter a 'boar', a fat woman who raids all the half-priced bentos before a battle starts. The next day, Yō meets Yū 'Wizard' Kaneshiro, who encourages Yō to stand up to a boar so that the bento battle can properly take place. Yō comes to understand the pride of the 'wolves' and comes out with his first victory, obtaining a bento with an honor seal from the 'God of Discounts'. Yō then returns to the clubroom, where Sen congratulates him on his first victory and shows him a scrapbook showing the victories Yū managed to obtain.
3	"Large Serving of Cheese-Filled Cutlet Curry 1080kcal" "Ōmori Chīzu Katsu Karē Senhachijū Kiro Karorī" (Japanese: 大盛りチーズカツカレー 1080kcal)	October 23, 2011
Yō is beaten up by the class president, Ume Shiraume, due to him hanging around Hana. As Yō and Hana go to a supermarket, they meet a kendo club member named Yamahara, who invites them to join a group called the Hounds, who use teamwork to help members get half-priced bento. As Yō and Hana take a trial period with the group, Yō feels the bento he obtains this method don't taste as good as he thinks. After reminiscing about old times, Yō turns down Yamahara's offer, realizing that food tastes best when you fight for it. Having realized the true meaning of half-price bento, Sen gives Yō and Hana keys to the club room. The next morning, Yō finds his cousin, Ayame Shaga, sleeping in his bed.
4	"Ginger Fried Pork Bento 852kcal" "Butaniku Shōgayaki Bentō Happyakugojūni Kiro Karorī" (Japanese: 豚肉生姜焼き弁当 852kcal)	October 30, 2011
Ayame is revealed to be a wolf known as 'The Beauty of the Lake' who throws down a challenge to Sen. After barely escaping from the lust of Ume, Ayame accompanies Yō and Sen to a bento brawl, where she and Sen fight for the same bento. As Sen manages to defeat Ayame and claim her bento, Yō finds himself against a tough opponent but manages to win in the end.
5	"Fish Soup with Hokkaido Salmon 326kcal" "Hokkaidō no Shake o Tsukatta Arajiru Sanbyakunijūroku Kiro Karorī" (Japanese: 北海道の鮭を使ったあら汁 326kcal)	November 6, 2011
Yō goes through some hassle to meet up with Ayame, where he also meets Asebi Inoue, who gives bad luck to anyone she touches. As Yō goes to a store with the others, he finds himself up against Ren Nikaidō, who is part of a group known as Gabriel Ratchet, and gets severely beaten by Tadaaki 'Monarch' Endo. After Yō regains consciousness, Ayame explains how Endo seeks revenge for some ancient slight, while Sen questions why she didn't warn Yō about him.
6	"Special Japanese Fried Chicken Bento 795kcal" "Tokusei Zangi Bentō Nanahyakukyūjūgo Kiro Karorī" (Japanese: 特製ザンギ弁当 795kcal)	November 13, 2011
As Sen heads towards a store alone, Ayame learns about how Yū triumphed over the previous monarch butterfly, Matsuba, with Endo, her successor, wanting revenge on Yū's successor, Sen. As Ayame warns Yō about this, Sen, who had gotten severely beaten up by the Gabriel Ratchets, arrives at the Ralph Store to face against Endo. As Ren feels regret after hearing words of disappointment from Matsuba, the current God of Discounts, he tries to stop Endo but is knocked away. As the brawl begins, Yō and Ayame arrive and together they manage to defeat Endo. Afterwards, Ren follows Matsuba's advice and starts to live for himself. Meanwhile, Yū leaves the country to study overseas, and Matsuba bids him farewell, after reminiscing about their bento brawl with each other and discussing Endo's plan to succeed her.
7	"Omelettits Bento 752kcal and Tent of Loco Moco Bento 1100kcal" "Omuppai Bentō Nanahyakugojūni Kiro Karorī to Rokomokkori Bentō Senhyaku Kiro Karorī" (Japanese: オムっぱい弁当 752kcalとロコもっこり弁当 1100kcal)	November 20, 2011
Matsuba gives Yō, Sen, Ayame and Hana free tickets to an indoor swimming pool, where they also run into Ren. There, they discover even a swimming pool has half-priced bento, featuring a unique bento brawl across the pool. As the waves provide a fierce battlefield, Yō manages to achieve his prey, albeit not without having embarrassing results.
8	"Jumbo Garlic Chive Hamburger Steak Bento 765kcal" "Tappuri Nira Hanbāgu Bentō Nanahyakurokujūgo Kiro Karorī" (Japanese: たっぷりニラハンバーグ弁当 765kcal)	November 27, 2011
Yō becomes hospitalized after jumping out of a window while trying to protect his Sega Saturn that Sen threw out the window, ending up completely wrapped in bandages. Meanwhile, a pair of twin sisters from Ayame's school both named Kyō Sawagi, the older of which appears to have a thing for Sen, infiltrate the hospital hoping to meet Sen. They mistake Yō for Sen and perform some curious inspections on him, leading to chaos when they actually learn the truth.
9	"Western and Japanese Food Mix 2910kcal and Warm Porridge Bento 340kcal" "Seiyō Wafū Makunouchi Tsumeawase Jū Nisenkyūhyakujū Kiro Karorī to Hokkori Okayu Bentō Sanbyakuyonjū Kiro Karorī" (Japanese: 西洋和風幕の内詰め合わせ重 2910kcalとほっこりおかゆ弁当340kcal)	December 4, 2011
Asebi decides to make Yō a homemade bento, in which every component tastes of something completely different. Meanwhile, Ume meets up with the Sawagi sisters concerning both Yō and Ayame trespassing on each others' schools. Later that night, as Hana has an accident with her computer while finishing up one of her erotic novels, Ume believes her to have fallen sick and comes over to tend to her 'fever'. As she does, she discovers one of Hana's books which she had posted Yō's face all over. Ume hits Yo once again, but not before he reveals Hana's passion for writing yaoi.
10	"It was a Warm Gentle Flavor that Reminded Me of my Grandmother. A Japanese Dish that was Kind to Both Body and Soul. Plum and Dried Baby Sardines over Rice with Plenty of Seasonal Vegetables Stewed Bento 480kcal" "Sore wa Mukashi Sobo no Ie de Tabeta Atataka de Yasashii Ajiwai. Kokoro nimo Karada nimo Yasashii Wa no Ryōri. Ume to Chirimenjako Gohan to Kisetsu no Yasai Tappuri no Nimono Bentō Yonhyakuhachijū Kiro Karorī" (Japanese: それは昔祖母の家で食べた温かで優しい味わい。心にも体にも優しい和の料理。梅とちりめんじゃこご飯と季節の野菜たっぷりの煮物弁当 480kcal)	December 11, 2011
Ayame is visited by Ren who tells her about a group called Orthros who are severely attacking other wolves and placing baskets on their heads. As Yō resumes his bento brawl duties, he becomes the latest victim to the Sawagi sisters. As Yō, Sen, Ayame and the others get together at a supermarket for a bento brawl the next day, Sen soon finds herself attacked by the sisters and, despite assistance from the others, is severely beaten.
11	"Pocari Sweat 125kcal" "Pokari Suetto Hyakunijūgo Kiro Karorī" (Japanese: ポカリスエット 125kcal)	December 18, 2011
Yō goes to visit Sen, who had been absent from school with a cold, where she discusses plans to fight against the twins for eel bentos in a few days. After another defeat by the twins, Yō and Ren learn from Ayame that they are the daughters of a chain store owner who came over from Yumehiro. Ren travels to Yumehiro to find out more while Ayame passes on Sen's message to the twins, although Sen's cold has gotten worse. Ren learns that, three years ago, the twins were driven out of Yumehiro by a brawler known as The Club of Hercules.
12	"Domestic Eel Bento 790kcal" "Kokusan Unagi Bentō Nanahyakukyūjū Kiro Karorī" (Japanese: 国産うなぎ弁当 790kcal)	December 25, 2011
With four hours left until the bento brawl and Sen still not over her fever, Yō decides to let her sleep in while he goes in her stead. On the way he encounters Hercules, who tells him something that causes him to run away. As the twins arrive at the store, they encounter Hercules, who is forcing the cooperation of the other wolves to exclude them from the fight, just like he did three years ago. However, Yō returns, having run to build up an appetite which reminds the other wolves why they fight and convinces them to brawl fairly. After beating Hercules, Yo manages to convince the twins to join in the fight, where the twins are defeated and Yō wins the prize seal to share with Sen.

== Reception ==
The Mainichi Shimbun reported that as of March 2011, over 550,000 copies of the light novels have been sold in Japan. The light novel series has ranked three times in Takarajimasha's light novel guide book Kono Light Novel ga Sugoi! published yearly: eighth in 2010, fifth in 2011, and third in 2012.

Theron Martin of Anime News Network gave the series an overall A− rating. Despite finding some inconsistencies with the animation in places, Martin praised the series for its action scenes, soundtrack and humor, concluding that: "Watching Ben-To definitely will not strain your brain, and doesn't delve into themes any more complicated than the value of integrity, or fostering a passion for life. Regardless, it's a pretty fun little show." Aiden Foote, writing for THEM Anime Reviews, saw potential in the premise but found the fight scenes and humor lacking and gave way to characters ranging from obnoxious (Ume and the Kyo sisters) to pointless (Hana and Shaga), saying that: "Ultimately, my displeasure towards the show lies deeply in disappointment, not because it isn't great (I never expected that) but that it's not even good. Without the stupid characters and the stupid humour, I might have been really able to enjoy this silly little series for all it was worth."

== See also ==
- Necromancer Isekai: How I Went from Abandoned Villager to the Emperor's Favorite, another light novel series with the same illustrator
