= Hiroyuki Kaidō =

Japanese manga artist

Hiroyuki Kaidō (sometimes Kaidou) 海童博行 is a Japanese manga artist and animation director. Her works include the artwork for the manga adaptation of the video game Tales of Innocence, which is serialized in Jump SQ. Kaidou has worked on two series with writer Yoshihiko Tomizawa, doing the artwork for Onmyou Taisenki and Gurimaru.

== Works ==
- Tales of Innocence (Jump SQ.)
- Onmyō Taisenki, manga and television series.
