= Seraph of the End =

Japanese manga series and its franchise

- First tankōbon volume cover, Yuichiro Hyakuya

終わりのセラフ (Owari no Serafu)
- Genre: Dark fantasy; Post-apocalyptic; Vampire
- Manga
- Written by: Takaya Kagami; Daisuke Furuya (storyboards)
- Illustrated by: Yamato Yamamoto
- Published by: Shueisha
- English publisher: NA: Viz Media
- Imprint: Jump Comics SQ.
- Magazine: Jump Square
- English magazine: NA: Weekly Shonen Jump
- Original run: September 4, 2012 – present
- Volumes: 36
Further information
Light novels
Guren Ichinose: Catastrophe at Sixteen (2013–16, 7 volumes); The Story of Vampire Mikaela (2015–16, 2 volumes); Guren Ichinose: Resurrection at Nineteen (2017–18, 2 volumes)
Manga
Serapetit! Seraph of the End four-frame manga
Written by	Takaya Kagami; Yamato Yamamoto; Daisuke Furuya
Illustrated by	Ren Aokita
Published by	Shueisha
Magazine	Jump SQ.19 (2014–2015); Jump Square (2015)
Original run	December 19, 2014 – December 4, 2015
Volumes	1
Anime television series
Directed by	Daisuke Tokudo
Written by	Hiroshi Seko
Music by	Hiroyuki Sawano; Takafumi Wada; Asami Tachibana; Megumi Shiraishi
Studio	Wit Studio
Licensed by	AUS: Universal/Sony; NA: Funimation; UK: Anime Limited
Original network	Tokyo MX, MBS, TVA, BS11, AT-X, TV Asahi Channel 1
English network	UK: Vice on TV
Original run	April 4, 2015 – December 26, 2015
Episodes	24
Manga
Seraph of the End: Guren Ichinose: Catastrophe at Sixteen
Written by	Takaya Kagami
Illustrated by	Yo Asami
Published by	Kodansha
English publisher	NA: Kodansha USA
Magazine	Monthly Shōnen Magazine
Original run	June 6, 2017 – February 4, 2022
Volumes	12
Video game
Seraph of the End: Bloody Blades
Developer	Bandai Namco Entertainment
Genre	RPG
Platform	iOS, Android
Released	September 28, 2015
Video game
Owari no Seraph: Unmei no Hajimari
Developer	Bandai Namco Entertainment
Genre	TRPG
Platform	PlayStation Vita
Released	December 17, 2015
Original video animation
Seraph of the End: Vampire Shahal
Directed by	Hironori Aoyagi
Written by	Hironori Aoyagi
Music by	Hiroyuki Sawano; Takafumi Wada; Asami Tachibana; Megumi Shiraishi
Studio	Wit Studio
Released	May 2, 2016
Runtime	23 minutes
- icon

Seraph of the End (Japanese: 終わりのセラフ, Hepburn: Owari no Serafu), also known as Seraph of the End: Vampire Reign, is a Japanese manga series written by Takaya Kagami, storyboarded by Daisuke Furuya, and illustrated by Yamato Yamamoto. It has been serialized in Shueisha's Jump Square since September 2012, with its chapters collected in 36 tankōbon volumes as of May 2026. The series is set in a world that allegedly comes to an end at the hands of a "human-made" virus, ravaging the global populace and leaving only children under the age of thirteen untouched. It is at this time that vampires emerge from the recesses of the earth, followed by the emergence of other supernatural entities thought only to be myth. A young man named Yuichiro Hyakuya joins a vampire extermination unit to avenge the deaths of his family and reclaim his childhood best friend Mikaela Hyakuya from the vampires.

An anime television series adaptation produced by Wit Studio was broadcast in two cours: the first aired from April to June 2015 and the second from October to December 2015. A series of light novels focused on Yu's superior, Guren Ichinose, have been written by Kagami and illustrated by Yamamoto. In North America, Viz Media licensed the series for an English language release, and it ran in Weekly Shonen Jump. The anime series was licensed by Funimation. It was later broadcast in the United Kingdom on Viceland in February 2018.

By October 2022, the Seraph of the End manga had over 15 million copies in circulation.

== Plot ==
In 2012, the world allegedly comes to an end at the hands of a "man-made" virus, ravaging the global populace and leaving only children under the age of thirteen untouched. At the same time, the vampires emerge from the recesses of the earth, followed by age-old horrors of the dark thought to be only myth. They sweep the earth and claim it in a single violent stroke, subjugating the remnants of humanity and leading them beneath the surface to safety. This "protection" comes at the price of "donating" blood to their captors, not knowing that they are vampires.

At the age of twelve, Yuichiro and his friend and fellow orphan Mikaela plotted to escape along with the children in Hyakuya Orphanage. This plan was brought into action by Mikaela, who had been secretly donating his blood to the Seventh Progenitor, Ferid Bathory, in exchange for a map and a gun. However, this plan resulted in every last person besides Yuichiro dying at the hand of Ferid, and Mikaela sacrificing himself in order for Yuichiro to escape and be saved by members of the Moon Demon Company, an extermination unit of the Japanese Imperial Demon Army. Four years later, Yuichiro dedicates his life to destroy vampires and seek revenge against them for killing his "family." At the same time, it is revealed that Mikaela survived thanks to Third Progenitor and Vampire Queen Krul Tepes, who gave him some of her blood to turn him into a vampire. Mikaela does become a vampire soldier right under Ferid Bathory, and plans to find Yuichiro.

== Media ==
=== Manga ===
Written by Takaya Kagami, storyboarded by Daisuke Furuya, and illustrated by Yamato Yamamoto, Seraph of the End started its serialization in Shueisha's monthly magazine Jump Square on September 4, 2012. A voice comic (vomic) was also produced and published by Shueisha, and its first episode was featured by Sakiyomi Jum-Bang! on February 1, 2013. The series is set to end on December 4, 2026. Shueisha has collected its chapters into individual tankōbon volumes. The first volume was released on January 4, 2013. As of May 1, 2026, thirty-six volumes have been published. The series is set to end with its 37th volume.

The manga is licensed in North America by Viz Media, who added it to its Weekly Shonen Jump digital magazine lineup.

==== Spin-offs ====
A spin-off gag manga to commemorate the anime adaptation, titled Serapetit! Seraph of the End four-frame manga (せらぷち!〜終わりのセラフ4コマ編〜, Serapuchi! Owari no Serafu 4-koma-hen), was serialized in Jump SQ.19 from December 19, 2014, to February 19, 2015, and later serialized in Jump Square from April 4 to December 4, 2015. It was also published on the Seraph of the End official website.

A manga adapting the Guren Ichinose light novel series was serialized in Kodansha's Monthly Shōnen Magazine from June 6, 2017, to February 4, 2022. Its chapters were collected in 12 volumes. At Anime Expo 2022, Kodansha USA announced that they licensed the series for English publication.

=== Light novels ===
Seraph of the End: Guren Ichinose: Catastrophe at Sixteen (終わりのセラフ 一瀬グレン、16歳の破滅, Owari no Serafu Ichinose Guren, 16-sai no Hametsu) is a prequel focusing on Guren Ichinose as the main protagonist, detailing the series of events that occurred eight years before the start of the manga. Written by Takaya Kagami and illustrated by Yamato Yamamoto, it consists of seven volumes and was published by Kodansha from January 2013 to December 2016. On February 15, 2015, Vertical announced that it has licensed the light novels for a North American release and will be releasing it in an omnibus with two volumes per omnibus in January 2016. The novels have also been translated into other languages, such as German and French by Kazé. A drama CD was released on October 30, 2015, bundled with volume 6 of the light novel and is written by Kagami.

No.	Original release date	Original ISBN	English release date	English ISBN
1	January 4, 2013	978-4-06-375279-3	January 26, 2016	978-19-4122098-6
2	July 2, 2013	978-4-06-375311-0	January 26, 2016	978-19-4122098-6
3	January 31, 2014	978-4-06-375354-7	May 31, 2016	978-19-4299374-2
4	July 2, 2014	978-4-06-375396-7	May 31, 2016	978-19-4299374-2
5	April 2, 2015	978-4-06-381451-4	November 8, 2016	978-19-4299305-6
6	October 30, 2015	978-4-06-381491-0; 978-4-06-358784-5 (LE)	November 8, 2016	978-19-4299305-6
7	December 2, 2016	978-4-06-381572-6	September 25, 2018	978-19-4505430-3

A new light novel series about Mikaela's story and the origin of vampires titled Seraph of the End: The Story of Vampire Mikaela (終わりのセラフ 吸血鬼ミカエラの物語, Owari no Serafu Kyūketsuki Mikaela no Monogatari) began publication by Shueisha on December 4, 2015. The story is written by Takaya Kagami and illustrated by Yamato Yamamoto.

No.	Japanese release date	Japanese ISBN
1	December 4, 2015	978-4-08-703358-8
2	May 2, 2016	978-4-08-703395-3

On October 20, 2017, it was announced on Kodansha's light novel blog that a second spin-off series about Guren, titled Seraph of the End: Guren Ichinose: Resurrection at Nineteen (終わりのセラフ 一瀬グレン、19歳の世界再誕(リザレクション), Owari no Serafu Ichinose Guren, 19-sai no sekai Resurrection) would be released in December. It is written by Takaya Kagami and illustrated by Yo Asami. On March 11, 2019, Vertical announced that it has licensed the novels for an English release in North America starting in December 2019.

No.	Original release date	Original ISBN	English release date	English ISBN
1	December 27, 2017	978-4-06-381636-5	December 31, 2019	978-19-4998005-9
2	November 30, 2018	978-4-06-514385-8	March 31, 2020	978-19-4998014-1

=== Anime ===
An anime television series adaptation was announced on August 28, 2014, and aired on April 4, 2015. The series has 24 episodes. It is produced by Wit Studio, directed by Daisuke Tokudo, and written by Hiroshi Seko. Additionally, the original manga's writer, Takaya Kagami, personally drafted the original story for episodes with material not yet serialized in the manga and supervised the scripts until the anime's final episode. On December 12, 2014, it was announced the series would be split into two parts (quarters of the year). The first half (12 episodes) aired from April to June 2015, and the second half aired from October to December 2015. The series premiered on Tokyo MX, MBS, TV Aichi, and BS11 at their respective time slots. NBCUniversal Entertainment Japan released the first 12 episodes on Blu-ray and DVD formats in Japan starting on June 24, 2015, across four volumes. A six-minute omake anime special adapted from the omake featured in the original manga was included in each Blu-ray/DVD volume titled Seraph of the Endless (終わらないセラフ, Owaranai Serafu).

On March 31, 2015, it was announced that Funimation has licensed the series for streaming and its home video release in North America. Hulu also streamed the series. On May 13, Funimation announced that the English broadcast dub would stream every Wednesday at 8:30 p.m. EDT on its "Dubble Talk" streaming block. In the United Kingdom, the English dub was broadcast on Viceland, beginning February 15, 2018.

An original animation DVD (OAD) bundled with volume 11 of the original manga titled Seraph of the End: Vampire Shahal (終わりのセラフ 吸血鬼シャハル, Owari no Serafu: Kyūketsuki Shaharu) was released on May 2, 2016. It was first screened at the Jump Special Anime Festa 2015 event in November 2015.

Hiroyuki Sawano produced and co-composed the music, as well as the opening and ending themes, "X.U." and "scaPEGoat", respectively, with Takafumi Wada, Asami Tachibana, and Megumi Shiraishi. As part of Sawano's vocal song project "SawanoHiroyuki[nZk]", for the first 12 episodes, the opening song is performed by SawanoHiroyuki[nZk]:Gemie, while the ending song is performed by SawanoHiroyuki[nZk]:Yosh. Both themes were released in Japan on a CD on May 20, 2015.

=== Video games ===
A PlayStation Vita strategy game, titled Owari no Seraph: Unmei no Hajimari (終わりのセラフ 運命の始まり), was released by Bandai Namco Entertainment on December 17, 2015.

BNEI also released a smartphone game titled Seraph of the End: Bloody Blades (終わりのセラフ BLOODY BLADES, Owari no Seraph: Bloody Blades) on September 28, 2015.

== Reception ==
The manga was nominated for the 40th Kodansha Manga Award for shōnen category in 2016.

Rebecca Silverman of Anime News Network gave volume 1 an overall grade of B+.

=== Sales ===
Volume 1 reached 24th place on the Japanese weekly manga chart, and, by January 13, 2013, has sold 62,434 copies. It also reached third place on The New York Times manga bestseller chart. Volume 2 reached 15th place on the weekly manga chart, and, by May 12, 2013, has sold 91,095 copies. Volume 3 reached ninth place, and, by September 15, 2013, has sold 121,235 copies. Volume 4 also reached ninth place on the chart, and, by January 19, 2014, has sold 160,444 copies. Volume 5 also reached ninth place, and, by May 11, 2014, has sold 155,139 copies.

In 2015, the manga sold 2.8 million copies. By May 2017, the manga had 7 million copies in print; 8.5 million copies in print by April 2018; over 9 million copies in print by March 2019; over 10 million copies in print by August 2019; over 12 million copies in print by June 2021; and over 15 million copies in circulation by October 2022.

The Guren Ichinose: Catastrophe at Sixteen light novels reached 21st place as one of the top-selling light novels in Japan, with 128,690 copies sold in May 2015, and it additionally reached 29th place in 2016, with 100,077 more copies sold. The Story of Vampire Mikaela novels also reached 21st place, having sold 127,373 copies in May 2016. Its manga adaptation second volume reached 25th place on the Japanese's weekly manga chart, with 30,147 copies in print.
