= Yamato Yamamoto =

Japanese manga artist

Yamato Yamamoto 山本 ヤマト
- Born: March 1, 1983 (age 43) Ibaraki Prefecture, Japan
- Area: Manga artist

Yamato Yamamoto (山本 ヤマト, Yamamoto Yamato; born March 1, 1983) is a Japanese manga artist most notable for providing the illustrations for the Kentarō Katayama's light novel series Kure-nai, as well as creating the related manga. Yamamoto has also been the illustrator for the manga series Seraph of the End.

== Works ==
- 9S vol. 1–9, SS, Memories (light novel)
- Denpa teki na Kanojo vol. 1–3 (light novel)
- Kure-nai vol. 1–4 (light novel)
- Kure-nai vol. 1–10 (manga, Jump SQ.)
- Seraph of the End, vol. 1–34, present (manga Jump SQ)
