= Luck Stealer =

Japanese manga series

- First tankōbon volume cover, featuring Yusei Kurusu
- Genre: Action; Low fantasy; Thriller
- Manga
- Written by: Hajime Kazu
- Published by: Shueisha
- Imprint: Jump Comics SQ.
- Magazine: Jump Square
- Original run: November 2, 2007 – January 4, 2012
- Volumes: 10
- icon

Luck Stealer is a Japanese manga series written and illustrated by Hajime Kazu. It was serialized in Shueisha's shōnen manga magazine Jump Square from November 2007 to January 2012, with its chapters collected in ten tankōbon volumes.

== Plot ==
Yusei Kurusu is "Luck Stealer", a Japanese assassin with the ability to drain a target of their "luck" and leave them only with misfortune. Soon after the target dies following an unfortunate series of events (example: a collapsing roof, an out of control car, or falling sign). He does so in order to sustain his daughter, Karin, who was born without any luck, and will die if Kurusu does not keep giving her it. She is the only person who can "receive" Kurusu's luck.

== Characters ==
=== Main characters ===
Yusei Kurusu aka "Luck Stealer"
He was born with the ability to drain people of their luck by touching them. Left with bad luck, the person is doomed to die an unfortunate or accidental death. Kurusu himself accidentally killed his parents and uncle by unknowingly absorbing their luck. He also ended up killing a bully at the orphanage he lived in after his family's death, as well as a school mate who had picked a fight with him. After leaving the gang he had joined and marrying Rika Kinoshita, his steady girlfriend, Kurusu gets a job at "Flamingo" as an assassin to collect luck. Initially he carried out any hit, but after his wife died he swore to only steal from "bad guys" so as to honor her memory.
While leaving a person with nothing but bad luck, Kurusu will become extremely lucky if he absorbs enough. It can reach a point where he is able to walk through speeding traffic, or dodge oncoming bullets without so much as trying.
Though he is often sharp, and distant towards people, he loves his daughter, whom he must give luck to or else she will die. Kurusu has the appearance of a "foreigner", silver or white hair and blue eyes, and often wears sunglasses.
Karin
Kurusu's daughter, who was born without luck. Though somewhat ignorant of her condition and her father's power, she understands that she needs "a charm" (which in reality is her father's touch) to stay safe. Despite all of this, she is a very bright and happy child, who always looks out for others. She lives with her maternal grandparents, as Kurusu is often too busy with his "work".

=== Supporting characters ===
Nakato
A former assassin himself for the mob, he is now the manager of the Flamingo bar, and a small group of hitmen. His number one is the Luck Stealer. He first encountered Kurusu while carrying out a job. Intrigued by Kurusu, he lets him live, and later allows him to work as an assassin.
Shinya Amasaki
Flamingo's former number one hitman, Shinya trained Kurusu during his early days as an assassin. Despite his normally calm demeanor and charm, he is a sadist and can be very violent. He is also very manipulative and cunning. Shinya is from a rich yakuza family, and therefore lives an extravagant lifestyle. This also makes him a target of police investigation. In order to avert attention, he sets Kurusu up so that the detective watching him would instead go after Kurusu.
Rika Kinoshita
Kurusu's deceased wife and Karin's mother. She and Kurusu first met when both were visiting the crash sight of their friend, Ōmura. Kurusu hides the fact that he is in a gang because he knows Rika despises violence. They start dating, and eventually Rika finds out that Kurusu is the "death god" she had heard. Despite this she still loves him, especially so after he saves her life from a rival gang. Kurusu gives up his former ways and tries to become a better person for her (i.e. he starts going back to school he quits the gang, and he gets a job) They move in together, against the wishes of Rika's father, and soon have a child. She dies after giving all of her luck to Kurusu, who had been injured while "working".
Manaka
The childhood friend of Kurusu, he is a smart geek, and asocial. He is studying the mysterious power, and wants to find a way save Karin, whom he has an odd attraction to. He ignores the fact that Kurusu is an assassin.
Inspector Himiyama
An intelligent inspector with some effective, yet questionable methods. Because he was targeting Shinya, he encounters Kurusu, who had been sent to kill someone on Shinya's orders. Himiyama then goes after Kurusu, as he witnessed the victim make contact with Kurusu and then immediately die. He tails Kurusu, and confronts him, just as Kurusu finishes collecting luck from another target. The apartment of the victim explodes, and when Himiyama rushes in he finds the man dead, just as Kurusu had said he would be. He is trapped inside by wreckage and smoke but is saved by Kurusu, and sees him perform "miracles" as he exits the building. He concludes that Kurusu must be a shinigami or a God.
Masaharu Kinoshita
Kurusu's father-in-law, Rika's father and Karin's grandfather. He previously had a company job, but now runs a restaurant with his wife so he can spend more time with his family. At first, he forbid Rika to see Kurusu because he thought he was "a no good kid". He came around after witnessing Kurusu's kindness towards a distressed and crying child.
Kanae Kinoshita
Mother-in-law to Kurusu, and wife of Masaharu. She and her husband are Karin's guardians because of Kurusu's work.

== Publication ==
Written and illustrated by Hajime Kazu, Luck Stealer was serialized in Shueisha's shōnen manga magazine Jump Square from November 2, 2007, (Note: It started in the magazine's December 2007 issue (debut issue), released on November 2 of that same year.) to January 4, 2012. Shueisha collected its chapters in ten tankōbon volumes released from May 10, 2008, to February 3, 2012.

=== Volumes ===
No.	Release date	ISBN
1	May 10, 2008	978-4-08-874538-1
2	September 4, 2008	978-4-08-874571-8
3	January 5, 2009	978-4-08-874623-4
4	April 3, 2009	978-4-08-874670-8
5	August 4, 2009	978-4-08-874720-0
6	January 4, 2010	978-4-08-874770-5
7	August 4, 2010	978-4-08-870056-4
8	February 4, 2011	978-4-08-870181-3
9	September 2, 2011	978-4-08-870329-9
10	February 3, 2012	978-4-08-870379-4

== Reception ==
Volume 3 reached the 26th place on the weekly Oricon manga charts, selling 25,574 copies.

On AnimeLand, volume 1 received a staff rating of "interesting". On Manga News, the series has a staff rating of 16.3 out of 20, and it was called "a strong interesting work, of great richness". On Manga Sanctuary, volume 1 received a rating of 2.5 stars from a staff member.
