= Kentarō Katayama =

Japanese light novelist (born 1973)

Kentarō Katayama (片山 憲太郎, Katayama Kentarō; born 1973) is a Japanese light novelist best known for his series Kure-nai, which has been adapted into a manga in Jump SQ. and an anime. Kure-nai has three individual books illustrated by Yamato Yamamoto. Katayama won an honorable mention at the Super Dash Novel Rookie of the Year Awards in 2003 for his story Denpa teki na Kanojo.

== Novels ==
- Denpateki na Kanojo
- Denpateki na Kanojo ~Orokamono no Sentaku~
- Denpateki na Kanojo ~Kōfuku Gēmu~
- Kure-nai
- Kure-nai ~Guillotine~
- Kure-nai ~Shūakusai 1~
- Kure-nai ~Shūakusai 2~
