= Kure-nai =

Japanese light novel series

- Cover of Kure-nai volume 1 as published by Shueisha featuring Shinkurō Kurenai (center) and Murasaki Kuhōin (right)

紅
- Light novel
- Written by: Kentarō Katayama
- Illustrated by: Yamato Yamamoto
- Published by: Shueisha
- Imprint: Super Dash Bunko
- Original run: December 2005 – April 2008
- Volumes: 4
- Manga
- Written by: Kentarō Katayama
- Illustrated by: Yamato Yamamoto
- Published by: Shueisha
- Imprint: Jump Comics SQ.
- Magazine: Jump Square
- Original run: November 2, 2007 – June 4, 2012
- Volumes: 10
- Anime television series
- Directed by: Kō Matsuo; Assistant director: Mitsue Yamazaki
- Produced by: Makoto Ōyoshi; Masashi Takatori; Shinya Shinozaki; Shinichi Ikeda
- Written by: Kō Matsuo
- Music by: Ken Muramatsu
- Studio: Brain's Base
- Licensed by: NA: Sentai Filmworks
- Original network: CTC, tvk, TV Saitama, TVO, TV Aichi
- Original run: April 3, 2008 – June 19, 2008
- Episodes: 12
- Original video animation
- Directed by: Kō Matsuo
- Produced by: Makoto Ōyoshi; Shinya Shinozaki
- Written by: Kō Matsuo
- Music by: Ken Muramatsu
- Studio: Brain's Base
- Released: July 2, 2010 – December 3, 2010
- Runtime: 29 minutes
- Episodes: 2

Kure-nai (Japanese: 紅; "Crimson") is a Japanese light novel series by Kentarō Katayama, with illustrations by Yamato Yamamoto. A manga adaptation started serialization in the first issue of Jump Square magazine and had its last chapter published in the June 2012 issue. An anime adaptation by Brain's Base aired in Japan from April 3, 2008, to June 19, 2008.

== Plot ==
Orphaned sixteen-year-old high school student Shinkurō Kurenai, a specialist in settling squabbles between people, is one day approached by his employer Benika Jūzawa with the seven-year-old daughter of a powerful plutocratic family asking him to be the child's bodyguard.

== Characters ==
Shinkurō Kurenai (紅 真九郎, Kurenai Shinkurō)
Voiced by: Miyuki Sawashiro
The main protagonist of the series and is a student at a local high school. Despite his looks and easygoing personality, he is a capable and strong worker who works for Benika as a dispute mediator. When he was young, he lost his family in a terrorist attack. As a result, he became withdrawn from the world until he met Benika. He wished to be as strong as her so he could live on. Benika decided to leave him at the Hōzuki household. It was there that he trained his body extensively and learned Hōzuki-style martial arts. He is also a resident of the Samidare Apartments, a rundown apartment complex.
His kind demeanor attracts considerable attention from the opposite gender, though he is completely oblivious. In emergencies, he is able to produce a large 'horn' out of his right elbow which classes him as "Type 1 Class 2 Fighting Demon". This special weapon was designed for the purpose of assassination. Calling out the weapon allows him display supernatural feats of strength in combat, but at the cost of shortening his lifespan. When he is forced to fight, his personality changes to a more aggressive one.
Between the anime and the manga, there are differences in the way Shinkurō is depicted. In the anime, Shinkurō is not as confident and appears to have less control over the Hozuki horn.
Murasaki Kuhōin (九鳳院 紫, Kuhōin Murasaki)
Voiced by: Aoi Yūki
Murasaki is the daughter of Souju and Renjo Kuhōin. The Kuhōin family maintains a tradition that their offspring must be of pure blood. As a result, women in the Kuhōin family are in a completely submissive role and considered objects only for the purpose of breeding. They are confined in a remote area known as the Inner Sanctuary. As her dying wish, Souju pleaded to Benika to one day fulfill a wish for Murasaki. When Murasaki became seven years old, she wished to fall in love just as her mother did. She understood that her mother endured in the Inner Sanctuary because of her love for Renjo. To keep her promise to Souju, Benika help Murasaki escape from Inner Sanctuary and entrusted her to Shinkurō. She's never been to school before due to a rule of the Kuhōin family that strictly forbids children of any age from attending school and receiving an education; though later in the OVA episodes she begins attending school-(as a first grader) like a typical child would.
Although she was stubborn and snobbish at the start of the series, Shinkurō is quick to scold her if she did anything wrong. As a result, Murasaki quickly learned how to behave as a "commoner" and begins to trust Shinkurō. She also makes friends with the other residents at May Rain. However, after a while, Murasaki is kidnapped and taken back to Inner Sanctuary by her older half-brother/arranged fiancee and her father's subordinates. After hearing from Benika the truth behind Inner Sanctuary, Shinkurō vows to meet Murasaki again to hear her true feelings. When confronted by Shinkurō, Murasaki reveals that she does not wish to live in Inner Sanctuary and Shinkurō proceeds to save Murasaki from her fate in the Kuhōin family.
Murasaki grows very attached to Shinkurō. Despite being only seven years old, she gets jealous when Shinkurō gets close to other girls. She has expressed her desire to marry Shinkurō. However, because she is still young, she wants to wait until she is older before she confesses her love for Shinkurō.
In the anime, Murasaki remains in Kuhoin Mansion on the condition that the entire system changes along with being given the choice to choose her partner and live her life the way she wants to.
Benika Jūzawa (柔沢 紅香, Jūzawa Benika)
Voiced by: Sawa Ishige
She is also a mediator and Shinkurō's employer who was responsible for helping Shinkurō get back on his feet after he lost his family. For that, Shinkurō respects and looks up to Benika. She is a calm and collected person who goes with her intuition. She used to work for the Kuhōin family, taking the opportunity to gather contacts and information using the family's influence before striking out on her own. On behalf of Murasaki's mother's last wish, she took Murasaki out of the Inner Sanctuary and placed her in the care of Shinkurō who she believes is similar to her. Benika has a son, whose identity and location is kept secret though she also seems to consider Shinkurō as another adopted son. As a mediator Benika is very strong, relying on firearms which she wields with deadly accuracy even with fully automatic weapons and is infamous because of her strength.
Though still an excellent fighter, Benika is somewhat weaker in the anime. In the manga, her strength is so great as to be considered supernatural. Another difference between the anime and manga is Benika's expressions. In the anime, Benika's expressions are noticeably kinder.
Yayoi Inuzuka (犬塚 弥生, Inuzuka Yayoi)
Voiced by: Aiko Ōkubo
She works for Benika as one of her subordinates and has a tendency to overstep her bounds with complaints about Shinkurō. She believes that an important job like protecting Murasaki would better be left in more capable and experienced hands. She also possesses a hidden singing talent.
Ginko Murakami (村上 銀子, Murakami Ginko)
Voiced by: Nozomi Masu
A girl with a taciturn personality who works as an information broker, following in her grandfather's footsteps. Her sources allow her to find information of all kinds, including new jobs for Shinkurō to help his livelihood. She has been Shinkurō's friend since childhood. After he lost his family, she tried, without success, to cheer him up. When Shinkurō was about to be killed, Ginko tried desperately to save him.
Although she often seems cold, Ginko does have a softer side. This is exhibited around her dog, Ginkurou (named after herself and Shinkurou, who considered themselves its parents), a stray cat, and Murasaki. From this, it can be concluded that, while she is blunt, Ginko rarely intends to actually hurt anyone's feelings.
Because Shinkurō's job as a mediator leaves him covered in wounds, Ginko constantly offers him a job at her family's ramen shop where she works part-time. She hopes that Shinkurō will quit his job as a mediator and come work (and live) with her. Ginko also likes Shinkurō, but isn't as open with her feelings as other female characters. Even so, Ginko notably gets irritated whenever other girls, especially Yūno, flock around Shinkurō.
Yūno Hōzuki (崩月 夕乃, Hōzuki Yūno)
Voiced by: Ryoko Shintani
A girl with whom Shinkurō lived when he was young and also his sparring partner. In the manga she appears as a curvaceous and attractive girl. Her soft demeanor (albeit with yandere tendencies, triggered by other girls approaching Shinkurō) hides the fact that she is a strong fighter, whom Shinkurō acknowledges to be much stronger than himself, despite her being older by just one year. She possesses absurd supernatural strength obtained through her family martial arts; able to crush concrete with her bare hands and smash a huge hole in the wall even at a young age. Yūno is upset that Shinkurō has not realized he was her first love. She has feelings for Shinkurō, always finding excuses to spend time with him, such as cooking meals for him. However, her advances tend to be very threatening (most likely because Shinkurō always has another girl with him) and scare him into just letting her hear what she wants. Yūno resents the decision Shinkurō made in deciding to move out her household to live on his own and fears he will change into a hooligan. She has made it very clear that she wants him back in the Hōzuki household. Yūno has a younger sister named Chizuru, who is five. Even though the Hōzuki family are no longer assassins, their grandfather expects Yūno and Chizuru to carry on the Hōzuki family martial arts.
In the anime, Yūno is much more assertive in her advances towards Shinkurō and does not appear to have the yandere tendencies. Her body figure is also toned down to more average levels.
Tamaki Mutō (武藤 環, Mutō Tamaki)
Voiced by: Asami Sanada
She is a university student who lives in the same building as Shinkurō. She can be described as a very flirtatious person and her advances are noticeably more aggressive with Shinkurō. She says she is very knowledgeable in the ways of love but doesn't include her own experiences as she has a hard time keeping a boyfriend. She has grown fond of Murasaki and teaches her all kinds of perverted terms, much to Shinkurō's dismay and objections. Tamaki is an instructor at a karate dojo, and is very formidable at fighting, with notable feats such as stopping a punch with just two fingers and standing on par with Yūno at full strength.
In the anime, she is just a normal university student looking for love and does not possess fighting skills.
Yamie (闇絵, Yamie)
Voiced by: Haruka Kimura
A mysterious woman, she is another tenant of the building Shinkuro lives in. She always wears black and calls herself a very sinful woman. She likes cats and usually keeps to herself except when it comes to Shinkurō and Tamaki; it can be assumed that a familiar black cat named Davide belongs to her. Her attitude can be considered sarcastic most times.
She seems to have history with Benika.
Renjō Kuhōin (九鳳院 蓮丈, Kuhōin Renjō)
Voiced by: Takaya Kuroda
He is Murasaki's father who has a frightening appearance-(in the manga only). He seems to have a history with Benika, as she calls him "General of the Kuhōin". As expected of the head of the Kuhōin family, Renjō wields enormous power and his decisions are absolute. When Shinkurō stood up to him along with Murasaki, who pleaded for permission to leave the Inner Sanctuary, he granted her wish because he was too busy to deal with such trivial matters.
In the anime, Renjō is a different character (with a different appearance, too). In order to protect the secrets of Inner Sanctuary, Renjō marries an outsider named Kazuko. Kazuko pretended to be Murasaki's mother and Souju, Murasaki's birth mother, was given the duty of a caretaker. Despite being married to Kazuko, Renjō was actually in love with Souju. Kazuko was well aware of this and took out her frustration by physically abusing Souju. Before long, Souju, disappointed that Renjō would not protect her own daughter, committed suicide. At the end of the anime, Renjō finally realizes that the Kuhōin family system is wrong and vows to change it in order to protect everyone.
Ryuuji Kuhōin (九鳳院 竜士, Kuhōin Ryuuji)
Voiced by: Nobuhiko Okamoto
One of Renjō's sons and Murasaki's older brother, intended for her to be the one to carry his child in the future. In the anime, he is shown as someone loyal to the Kuhōin tradition, much more than his father, even to the point where he would do anything in his power in order to get Murasaki back in the Inner Sanctuary. He also revealed at the end of the anime that he used to be one of Benika's pupils when he was very young, which explains why he was able to block out most of Benika's attacks.
Kirihiko Kirishima (斬島 切彦, Kirishima Kirihiko)
Voiced by: Mikako Takahashi
A fourteen-year-old girl with sleepy-looking eyes and a large scarf that Shinkurō "saves". She is actually a reputable hitman from the Akuu Company known as "Guillotine". Though she is just fourteen, she unintentionally has perverted reactions to events, such as assuming Shinkurō wanted a threesome in the back alley with her and Murasaki. As if pressing his hand against her chest wasn't proof enough that she was a girl, she even offered to show him an upskirt. She seems to be weak to the cold and heat. After encountering Shinkurō a couple more times, she develops a crush on him and steals a kiss from him. Now, she is trying her best to understand the concept of friends as she slowly makes the effort to make other friends within their circle.
Even though she's an introvert, her personality dramatically changes whenever she wields any knife-type weapon in her hand. She appears to have supernatural strength, being able to carve pavement and metal railings into pieces with just one stroke using a butter knife. Much like Yūno Hōzuki, her family, Kirishima, is also part of the thirteen Inner Families, descendants of assassins. Her male name indicates she is the direct descendant of the head family.
Kirihiko does not appear in the TV anime adaptation, though she appears in all other media, including the OAD episodes.
Lin Cheng-Shin (リン・チェンシン, Lin Chenshin)
Voiced by: Kana Ueda
A female imperial guard of the Kuhōin family, Lin is the newest bodyguard of Murasaki, replacing her former guard, Kiba, due to female convenience. Armed with a pair of katana, her fighting skills are formidable, though not at the level of Yayoi Inuzuka. Although she disapproves of Shinkurō, nevertheless, she accepts him as Murasaki's companion, and frowns heavily on all the attention Shinkurō receives from other girls (even if he is unaware of it). Lin takes Murasaki's wishes literally, including attempting to get Shinkurō and Murasaki wedded to each other, despite not having permission from either party (or their families, for that matter). Under Murasaki's care, Lin is slowly learning about normal life, albeit with some difficulty.
Lin is a completely different character in the anime. She has no interest in the Kuhōin family matters and only works for them because she desires strong opponents to defeat.
Lucy May (ルーシー・メイ, Rūshī Mei)
Voiced by: Akira Tomisaka
A woman who works as the middleman for the Akuu Company, a secret mercenary group of assassin and skilled individuals.
Zena Hoshigami (星噛 絶奈, Hoshigami Zena)
A woman working for the Akuu Company and whose family is also part of the thirteen Inner Families. Her body is so tough that knives, bullets or even falling from a great height can't kill her.

== Media ==
=== Light novels ===
No.	Title	Release date	ISBN
01	Kure-nai 紅	December 20, 2005	4-08-630272-1
02	Kure-nai ~Guillotine~ 紅 ～ギロチン～	July 25, 2006	4-08-630290-X
03	Kure-nai ~Shuuakusai~ (Part 1) 紅 ～醜悪祭～（上）	November 22, 2007	978-4-08-630342-2
04	Kure-nai ~Shuuakusai~ (Part 2) 紅 ～醜悪祭～（下）	25 April 2008	978-4-08-630416-0

=== Manga ===
A manga adaption is running in Jump Square magazine, with art by Yamato Yamamoto, the original illustrator of the novels. As of August 2012, ten manga volumes have been released.

No.	Release date	ISBN
1	June 4, 2008	978-4-08-874509-1
2	November 4, 2008	978-4-08-874598-5
3	May 1, 2009	978-4-08-874671-5
4	December 4, 2009	978-4-08-874771-2
5	July 2, 2010	978-4-08-870040-3
6	December 3, 2010	978-4-08-870155-4
7	June 3, 2011	978-4-08-870242-1
8	November 4, 2011	978-4-08-870338-1
9	March 2, 2012	978-4-08-870393-0
10	August 3, 2012	978-4-08-870486-9

=== Anime ===
An anime adaption was broadcast in Japan from April 3, 2008, to June 19, 2008. It is written and directed by Kō Matsuo. The anime version is different from the novel and manga in that the anime takes a more dramatic approach with a slice of life feel. The anime has been licensed by Sentai Filmworks, who will release the series on subtitled-only DVD.

=== OAD ===
A half-hour original animated DVD with three short stories was released together with the fifth volume manga on July 2, 2010. It is directed by Kō Matsuo. The designs of the characters as well as plot are based on the original novel and manga continuity (following the character designs from Yamato Yamamoto) rather than the anime adaption. A second OAD was released together with the sixth volume manga on December 3, 2010, with three more short stories based from the original novel and manga.
