= Black Tiger =

A black tiger is a pseudo-melanistic tiger with thick, merging stripes.

Black Tiger may also refer to:

- Penaeus monodon (Black tiger shrimp), one of the two most important species of farmed prawn
- Black Tiger (album), a 1982 release by Y&T
- Black Tiger (video game), an arcade game developed by the Japanese company Capcom in 1987
- Black Tiger Kung Fu ("Hark Fu Moon") a.k.a. Fu Jow Pai a Chinese martial art
- Northern Black Tiger Kung Fu, a Chinese martial art
- Black Tiger (rapper), a Swiss musician
- Black Tiger (professional wrestling), a wrestling persona portrayed by several people including Eddie Guerrero
- Black Tiger (manga), Osamu Akimoto's comic

== Militant & Military ==
- Black Tigers, special suicidal troops of the Tamil Tigers, a guerilla/rebel organization based in Sri Lanka
- Ravindra Kaushik, an Indian spy in Pakistan known by the pseudonym "Black Tiger"
- Black Tiger (tank), also known as Kaplan MT, a tank jointly produced by Turkey and Indonesia.India
- Black Tiger (military unit), formation within the Peshmerga

== Characters ==
- Black Tiger (Fengshen Yanyi), Fengshen Yanyi characters
- Black Tiger, an enemy from the video game Resident Evil
- Black Tiger, the evil twin of Tiger Mask, in the Tiger Mask Manga series
