= Kurohime =

Kurohime may refer to

- Mount Kurohime, a mountain in Nagano Prefecture, Japan
- Kurohime Station, a train station in the vicinity of the mountain
- Mahō-tsukai Kurohime, a manga serialized in Monthly Shonen Jump
