= Legendz =

Japanese media franchise

- Cover of the first manga volume

レジェンズ (Rejenzu)
- Genre: Fantasy
- Manga
- Written by: Rin Hirai
- Illustrated by: Makoto Haruno
- Published by: Shueisha
- English publisher: NA: Viz Media
- Magazine: Monthly Shōnen Jump
- Original run: 2003 – 2005
- Volumes: 4
- Anime television series

Legendz: Yomigaeru Ryūō Densetsu
- Directed by: Akitaro Daichi
- Studio: Studio Gallop
- Original network: Fuji TV
- Original run: April 4, 2004 – March 27, 2005
- Episodes: 50

Legendz (レジェンズ, Rejenzu) is a Japanese multimedia franchise created by Bandai and WiZ in 2003. The franchise began with a manga created by Rin Hirai and illustrated by Makoto Haruno, first serialized in Shueisha's Monthly Shōnen Jump in Japan. The manga was published in English by Viz Media in 2005.

The anime, Legendz: Tale of the Dragon Kings (レジェンズ 甦る竜王伝説, Rejenzu Yomigaeru Ryūō Densetsu; Legendz: Yomigaeru Ryūō Densetsu) is animated by Studio Gallop, directed by Akitaro Daichi, and aired on Fuji TV from April 2004 to March 2005. A pilot for an English dub of the series was produced for Hasbro, but was not picked up.

== Plot and setting ==
The story opens with the discovery of the "Soul Dolls" which contain legendary creatures of incredible power within them. The Dark Wiz company (DWC) wants access to all of them for unknown reasons, but four of the Soul Dolls go missing. The majority of the anime takes place in Brooklyn, New York City, with the Brooklyn Bridge as a much-featured landmark.

== Media ==
=== Manga ===
The Legendz manga was written by Rin Hirai and illustrated by Makoto Haruno. The manga was originally published in Shueisha's Monthly Shonen Jump from 2003–2005. The series was translated and adapted into English by Viz Media and released in four volumes with the first release in March 2005.

The story is about Ken Kazaki, a boy who attends Ryudo Elementary School. Together with Shiron, his faithful Windragon, fights with other people who like him breed monsters. Ken later participates in the Legendz Carnival.

No.	Original release date	Original ISBN	English release date	English ISBN
1	March 4, 2004	978-4-08-873583-2	March 1, 2005	978-1-59116-772-3
Chapter 001- The Tornado Comes!; Chapter 002- Volcano Hacker; Chapter 003- Spiritual Inheritor; Chapter 004- Eternal Champion
2	June 4, 2004	978-4-08-873615-0	May 31, 2005	978-1-59116-773-0
Chapter 005- Pool of Radiance; Chapter 006- Burnout!!; Chapter 007- Earthquake Trooper; Chapter 008- True Crystal
3	November 4, 2004	978-4-08-873687-7	November 1, 2005	978-1-59116-994-9
Chapter 009- Spiritual Wind; Chapter 010- Saga of the Tornado; Chapter 011- Necrom Menace; Chapter 012- Crossing Force; Chapter 013- Volcano Nemesis
4	April 4, 2005	978-4-08-873799-7	February 7, 2006	978-1-4215-0149-9
Chapter 014- Last Saga; Chapter 015- Overlord; Chapter 016- Jabberwock Reborn; Chapter 017- True Wind!; Chapter 018- LegendZ Become Legends

=== Anime ===
The anime was directed by Akitaro Daichi with character designs by Nagisa Miyazaki. The animation was produced by Studio Gallop. The sound director was Kazuya Tanaka. The anime opening theme is "Legendz of the Wind" (風のレジェンズ, Kaze no Legendz) by Kyoko. The two ending themes are "Dounimo Tomaranai~Nonstop" by Brenda Vaughn, from episode 1 through 37 and another version performed by Linda Yamamoto from 38 to 49, while the final episode's ending theme is "Sorairo no Yubisaki" by Yurie Kokobu. The anime ran on Fuji TV April 4, 2004, to March 27, 2005.

==== Home media ====
Volume	Episodes	Original Release
Legendz: Tale of the Dragon Kings 1	1-2	October 22, 2004
Legendz: Tale of the Dragon Kings 2	3-6	November 26, 2004
Legendz: Tale of the Dragon Kings 3	7-10	December 23, 2004
Legendz: Tale of the Dragon Kings 4	11-14	January 28, 2005
Legendz: Tale of the Dragon Kings 5	15-18	February 24, 2005
Legendz: Tale of the Dragon Kings 6	19-22	March 25, 2005
Legendz: Tale of the Dragon Kings 7	23-26	April 22, 2005
Legendz: Tale of the Dragon Kings 8	27-30	May 27, 2005
Legendz: Tale of the Dragon Kings 9	31-34	June 24, 2005
Legendz: Tale of the Dragon Kings 10	35-38	July 22, 2005
Legendz: Tale of the Dragon Kings 11	39-42	August 26, 2005
Legendz: Tale of the Dragon Kings 12	43-46	September 23, 2005
Legendz: Tale of the Dragon Kings 13	47-50	October 28, 2005

=== Video games ===
Legendz: Island of Ordeal (レジェンズ甦る試練の島) is a Game Boy Advance game that was produced by Bandai and released on July 29, 2004. The video game includes a unique accessory to "Reborn" the Legendz with a link cable connected to the "Soul Doll". Using the dedicated adapter, the Legendz can adventure automatically and the player can view these events as flashbacks. The game also provided growth of the Legendz through sharing with other players.

The video game, Legendz Fierce Fight! Saga Battle (レジェンズ 激闘!サーガバトル) is an action game for the PlayStation 2, originally released on December 16, 2004. Produced by Bandai Co., Ltd., it has a CERO rating for "All ages" and supports two player play. The game features more than 60 Legendz that the player uses to battle.

The third Legendz game to be released is Legendz: Sign of Nekuromu (レジェンズ サイン オブ ネクロム), a Game Boy Advance game that was produced by Bandai Co., Ltd. and released on February 17, 2005. The game requires the "Soul Doll" adapter, two versions were sold; one for players who already have the "Legendz: Island of Ordeal" and one which included the Soul Doll adapter. The game included the ability to "rewrite the IC data" to allow the player to create their own Legendz.

== Reception ==
The Anime Encyclopedia: A Guide to Japanese Animation Since 1917 makes note of the similarities to Dragon Drive in the introduction of Shu and Shiron. It also notes the similarities to Pokémon except with dragons and director Daichi's "stylistic similarities" to Grrl Power. The manga review compendium Manga: The Complete Guide praised the "elaborate universe" and "quirky artwork", but noted that the creatures were "bland".
