= Black Tiger (manga) =

Japanese manga series

- First tankōbon volume cover, featuring the title character
- Genre: Action; Western
- Manga
- Written by: Osamu Akimoto
- Published by: Shueisha
- Magazine: Grand Jump
- Original run: December 21, 2016 – February 1, 2023
- Volumes: 11
- icon

Black Tiger (stylized in all caps) is a Japanese manga series written and illustrated by Osamu Akimoto. It was serialized in Shueisha's seinen manga magazine Grand Jump from December 2016 to February 2023, with its chapters collected in 11 tankōbon volumes.

== Premise ==
In the turmoil following the American Civil War, security in the south has rapidly declined. In response, the United States government significantly increased the reward for bounties and issues licenses to kill to the best bounty hunters. The series follows one of these "Black Members", the female gunslinger Black Tiger.

== Production ==
Osamu Akimoto said Black Tiger came from having always wanted to draw a Western, recalling that everyone loved Spaghetti Westerns when he was a kid. Although he previously created one with the 2015 one-shot Allie, Shoot Your Gun, he said that there are many historical dramas nowadays, but no Westerns. He also described Black Tiger as an homage to manga artist Mikiya Mochizuki, who died in 2016, and his series Wild 7, where a bad guy defeats a bad guy.

Although it is Akimoto's first series following the completion of KochiKame: Tokyo Beat Cops (1976–2016), Black Tiger has a different style because it is serialized in a seinen manga magazine and he said it feels like a new start as a result. He said his roots are in gekiga and described the characters of Black Tiger as being gekiga, which means they do not speak much. The artist noted how even when he drew gun-shooting scenes in Mr. Clice, he did not show blood, but now he wants to draw more freely. Despite stating that drawing women has always been a weakness of his, Akimoto said strong-minded girls are easy and interesting to draw, so he wanted to use one as the main character.

== Publication ==
Written and illustrated by Osamu Akimoto, Black Tiger started in Shueisha's seinen manga magazine Grand Jump on December 21, 2016. The manga was published on an irregular basis until November 2019, when it started a regular serialization in the magazine. The series finished on February 1, 2023. Shueisha collected its chapters in 11 tankōbon volumes; the first volume was released on November 2, 2017, and includes the 2015 one-shot Allie, Shoot Your Gun (アリィよ銃を撃て！, Arii yo Jū o Ute!). The last volume was released on April 18, 2023.

=== Volumes ===
No.	Release date	ISBN
1	November 2, 2017	978-4-08-890802-1
2	December 19, 2018	978-4-08-891156-4
3	November 19, 2019	978-4-08-891392-6
4	April 17, 2020	978-4-08-891560-9
5	September 18, 2020	978-4-08-891661-3
6	January 19, 2021	978-4-08-891773-3
7	May 19, 2021	978-4-08-891878-5
8	October 19, 2021	978-4-08-892085-6
9	March 18, 2022	978-4-08-892257-7
10	September 16, 2022	978-4-08-892451-9
11	April 18, 2023	978-4-08-892671-1
