= CKBC =

CKBC may refer to:

- CKBC-FM, a Canadian radio station
- Crazy Kouzu Basketball Club, an anime OVA
