= Finder: Kyoto Jogakuin Monogatari =

Japanese manga series

- Tankōbon volume cover

ファインダー ―京都女学院物語― (Faindā Kyoto Jogakuin Monogatari)
- Genre: Slice of life
- Manga
- Written by: Osamu Akimoto
- Published by: Shueisha
- Magazine: Weekly Young Jump
- Original run: February 2, 2017 – March 29, 2018
- Volumes: 1
- icon

Finder: Kyoto Jogakuin Monogatari (Japanese: ファインダー ―京都女学院物語―, Hepburn: Faindā Kyoto Jogakuin Monogatari; "Finder: Kyoto Girls' School Story") is a Japanese manga series written and illustrated by Osamu Akimoto. It was serialized in Shueisha's seinen manga magazine Weekly Young Jump from February 2017 to March 2018, with its chapters collected in a single tankōbon volume.

== Publication ==
Written and illustrated by Osamu Akimoto, Finder: Kyoto Jogakuin Monogatari' was serialized in Shueisha's seinen manga magazine Weekly Young Jump from February 2, 2017, to March 29, 2018. Shueisha collected its chapters in a single tankōbon volume, released on April 19, 2018.

No.	Release date	ISBN
1	April 19, 2018	978-4-08-890894-6
1. "Summer" (夏, Natsu); 2. "Autumn" (秋, Aki); 3. "Winter" (冬, Fuyu); 4. "Spring" (春, Haru)
