= Mr. Clice =

Japanese manga series

- First tankōbon volume cover, featuring the title character
- Genre: Action; Comedy; Spy
- Manga
- Written by: Osamu Akimoto
- Published by: Shueisha
- Imprint: Jump Comics
- Magazine: Monthly Shōnen Jump (1985–2007); Jump Square (2017–2018); Jump SQ.Rise (2018–present)
- Original run: December 1985 – present
- Volumes: 15
- Anime
- icon

Mr. Clice is a Japanese manga series written and illustrated by Osamu Akimoto. It was irregularly serialized in Shueisha's shōnen manga magazine Monthly Shōnen Jump from 1985 to 2007. It resumed publication in Jump Square (2017–2018) and Jump SQ.Rise (2018–present). An anime adaptation has been announced.

== Premise ==
Jin Clice (繰巣 陣) is the top secret agent in Japan's National Special Operations Agency (国家特別工作機関; written in English as "Japan Special Team" or JST). But after being mortally wounded on a mission, the agency transfers his brain/mind into the body of a recently deceased 20-year-old woman in order to keep him alive. Clice continues his job as a spy, embarking on dangerous missions all around the world, while dealing with the new issues he faces as a woman and hoping to eventually obtain a male body again. He often works with Alexander Bellamacchia (アレキサンダー・ベラマッチャ), the agency's Italian operative.

== Media ==
=== Manga ===
Written and illustrated by Osamu Akimoto, Mr. Clice started in Shueisha's shōnen manga magazine Monthly Shōnen Jump in the December 1985 issue. It was irregularly serialized until June 6, 2007, when the magazine ceased publication. Shueisha collected its chapters in five tankōbon volumes, released from April 10, 1989, to May 1, 2003.

About nine years later, Akimoto resumed the series' publication in Jump Square, where it ran from February 3, 2017, to January 4, 2018. The series has continued in Jump SQ.Rise since April 16, 2018. Shueisha re-released the five first volumes in a new edition and released the sixth volume on November 2, 2017.

==== Volumes ====
No.	Release date	ISBN
1	April 10, 1989 (1st ed.); November 2, 2017 (2nd ed.)	978-4-08-871223-9 (1st ed.); 978-4-08-881271-7 (2nd ed.)
2	August 4, 1992 (1st ed.); November 2, 2017 (2nd ed.)	978-4-08-871224-6 (1st ed.); 978-4-08-881272-4 (2nd ed.)
3	April 4, 2001 (1st ed.); November 2, 2017 (2nd ed.)	978-4-08-873106-3 (1st ed.); 978-4-08-881273-1 (2nd ed.)
4	April 4, 2002 (1st ed.); November 2, 2017 (2nd ed.)	978-4-08-873256-5 (1st ed.); 978-4-08-881274-8 (2nd ed.)
5	May 1, 2003 (1st ed.); November 2, 2017 (2nd ed.)	978-4-08-873429-3 (1st ed.); 978-4-08-881275-5 (2nd ed.)
6	November 2, 2017	978-4-08-881276-2
7	September 4, 2018	978-4-08-881611-1
8	July 4, 2019	978-4-08-881888-7
9	July 3, 2020	978-4-08-882357-7
10	July 2, 2021	978-4-08-882721-6
11	July 4, 2022	978-4-08-883186-2
12	July 4, 2023	978-4-08-883572-3
13	July 4, 2024	978-4-08-884090-1
14	July 4, 2025	978-4-08-884574-6
15	July 3, 2026	978-4-08-885080-1

=== Anime ===
In December 2025, at the Jump Festa '26 event, it was announced that the series will receive an anime adaptation.
