= Osamu Akimoto =

Japanese manga artist (born 1952)

- 秋本 治
- Born: December 11, 1952 (age 73); Katsushika, Tokyo, Japan
- Occupation: Manga artist
- Writing career
- Pen name: Tatsuhiko Yamadome
- Years active: 1976–present
- Genre: Comedy
- Subjects: Shōnen manga, seinen manga
- Notable works: KochiKame; Mr. Clice; Black Tiger
- Notable awards: Shogakukan Manga Award (2005); Kikuchi Kan Prize (2016); Tezuka Osamu Cultural Prize (2017); Seiun Award (2017); Medal with Purple Ribbon (2019)

Osamu Akimoto (Japanese: 秋本 治, Hepburn: Akimoto Osamu; born December 11, 1952) is a Japanese manga artist from Katsushika, Tokyo. He is best known for his long-running comedy series KochiKame: Tokyo Beat Cops, which was continuously published in Weekly Shōnen Jump for 40 years from 1976 to 2016. With 1,960 chapters collected into 201 tankōbon volumes, it held the Guinness World Record for "Most volumes published for a single manga series" from September 2016 to July 2021. The series has sold over 155 million copies, making it one of the best-selling manga series in history. Akimoto's other works include the action comedy Mr. Clice, which has been published irregularly since 1985, and the Western series Black Tiger (2017–2023).

== Career ==
Before becoming a professional manga artist, Akimoto worked at the animation studio Tatsunoko Production on series such as Science Ninja Team Gatchaman. Akimoto made his manga debut with KochiKame: Tokyo Beat Cops (often shortened to Kochikame) under the pen name of Tatsuhiko Yamadome (山止 たつひこ) in 1976. He changed to using his real name in 1978, after the series reached its 100th chapter. The manga was continuously serialized in Weekly Shōnen Jump for 40 years from 1976 to 2016 and has sold over 155 million copies, making it one of the best-selling manga series in history. On December 31, 2016, Shueisha reprinted the Weekly Shōnen Jump issue that included the final chapter of Kochikame, marking the first time the magazine has ever been reprinted. Kochikame has spawned a large media franchise that includes adaptations both animated and live-action; an anime television series, several animated films, a live-action film, live-action TV drama, and stage adaptations.

In 1985, Akimoto started the action comedy series Mr. Clice, which follows the Japanese secret agent Jin Clice, who has the body of a woman but the mind of a man. It was originally serialized in Monthly Shōnen Jump from 1985 to 2007, before being revived in Jump SQ. in 2017 and transferring to Jump SQ. Rise in 2018.

In November 2010, Akimoto was one of several manga artists that held a press conference in opposition to Tokyo Metropolitan Ordinance Regarding the Healthy Development of Youths's Bill 156. In February 2014, he drew the one-shot "Vocalo" which is set 50 years after the rise of Vocaloid technology and ran in the shōjo manga magazine Margaret. The following year, Grand Jump published his "Allie, Shoot Your Gun" Western one-shot in January 2015.

In addition to resuming Mr. Clice, Akimoto launched three new manga series in three different Shueisha magazines in 2017. The Western Black Tiger was serialized in Grand Jump from the second issue of 2017, which was released in December 2016, until February 2023. Finder: Kyoto Jogakuin Monogatari was serialized in Weekly Young Jump from February 2017 until March 2018. It follows a group of four girls at an all-female high school in Kameoka, Kyoto. A "sequel" to Kochikame, Ii Yu da ne! ran in Ultra Jump from March 2017 to June 2019. Set in a bathhouse in Shitamachi, Gorō Kuma and his grandson are deeply moved when the Brazilian wife of Kuma's son arrives to save the bathhouse from having to close.

In 2019, Akimoto published Akimoto Osamu no Shigoto-jutsu, an instructional book that explains how he used schedule management to serialize a successful manga for 40 years.

== Awards and accolades ==
In 2005, Kochikame was one of two winners of the Special Judges Award at the 50th Shogakukan Manga Awards in 2005.

With 200 tankōbon volumes, Akimoto and Kochikame held the Guinness World Record for "Most volumes published for a single manga series" from September 2016 to July 2021. Also in 2016, Akimoto received the 64th Kikuchi Kan Prize for creating Kochikame for 40 years without breaks. The following year, he received the Special Prize at the 21st Tezuka Osamu Cultural Prize for the series, and the Seiun Award for Best Comic.

In 2019, the Japanese government gave Akimoto the Medal with Purple Ribbon for his contributions to the arts.

== Works ==
- KochiKame: Tokyo Beat Cops (こちら葛飾区亀有公園前派出所, Kochira Katsushika-ku Kameari Kōen Mae Hashutsujo; 1976–2016, serialized in Weekly Shōnen Jump)
- Mr. Clice (1985–2007, 2017–present, serialized in Monthly Shōnen Jump, Jump SQ. and Jump SQ. Rise)
- "Time..." (時は…; 2008, published in Jump SQ.)
- "Vocalo" (2014, published in Margaret)
- "Allie, Shoot Your Gun" (アリィよ銃を撃て！, Arii yo Jū o Ute!; 2015, published in Grand Jump)
- Black Tiger (2016–2023, serialized in Grand Jump)
- Finder: Kyoto Jogakuin Monogatari (ファインダー -京都女学院物語-; 2017–2018, serialized in Weekly Young Jump)
- Ii Yu da ne! (いい湯だね!; 2017–2019, serialized in Ultra Jump)

== Assistants ==
- Hiroshi Aro
- Naoki Azuma
- Yoshihiro Kuroiwa
- Usune Masatoshi
- Shōgo Sakamoto
- Chinatsu Tomizawa
