= Hiroshi Aro =

Japanese manga artist

Yoshihiro Tamogami
- 田母神 慈宏
- Born: May 15, 1959 (age 67); Tokyo, Japan
- Other name: Hiroshi Aro (pen name)
- Known for: Manga
- Notable work: Yuu and Mii; Morumo 1/10; Futaba-kun Change!

Yoshihiro Tamogami (田母神 慈宏, Tamogami Yoshihiro; born May 15, 1959 in Tokyo), better known by his pen name Hiroshi Aro (あろ ひろし, Aro Hiroshi), is a Japanese manga artist. He is mostly known for being the author of Futaba-Kun Change!, Morumo 1/10 and Yuu and Mii.

Aro worked as an assistant to manga artist Osamu Akimoto. He admitted that Futaba-kun Change! was created to be his version of Ranma ½ by Rumiko Takahashi, just as Yuu & Mi was his version of Takahashi's Maison Ikkoku. Aro makes guest appearances in his own comics, drawing himself as an alligator wearing glasses.

== Works ==
- Yuu and Mii (1986 – 1989, serialized in Monthly Shōnen Jump, Shueisha)
- Morumo 1/10 (1986 – 1987, serialized in Gekkan Shōnen Captain, Tokuma Shoten)
- Futaba-Kun Change! (1991 – 1997, serialized in Monthly Shōnen Jump, Shueisha)
- Hunter Cats (1993 – 1996, serialized in Shōnen Captain, Tokuma Shoten)
- Muteki Eiyuu Esugaiyaa (1994, Hakusensha)
- Kagaku no Nyotaimori (2002, Futabasha)
- Mikoto Nikki (2002, Shueisha)
- Meitantei Amikasa Kurisu!! (2004, Bunkasha)
- Boku no Shachōsama (2004 – 2012, Manga Time Jumbo, Houbunsha)
- Momoiro Bukken (1999 – 2002, Kyun, Cosmic International)
