= Tetsuya Kanmuri =

Tetsuya Kanmuri 冠 徹弥
- Born: 7 September 1971 (age 54); Uji, Kyoto Prefecture, Japan
- Genres: Heavy metal
- Occupations: Musician, singer, songwriter
- Instrument: Vocals
- Years active: 1991–present
- Website: thekanmuri.jp

Tetsuya Kanmuri (冠 徹弥, Kanmuri Tetsuya; born: 7 September 1971) is a Japanese heavy metal singer, originally from Uji, Kyoto Prefecture. He took his inspiration from Van Halen's songs.

== Biography ==
Kanmuri founded a cover band in the light music club of high school, and his instrument was the guitar. But when Kanmuri was in third grade at high school, he became a vocalist since the female vocalist withdrew from the band to prepare for her university entrance examination. He graduated from Bukkyo University. Kanmuri acquired a teaching license for modern society in university.

In 1991 he founded "So What?" as a major debut with the release of their first album on Victor Entertainment: "So What?" often appeared on the "Wachacha live" in Shinsaibashi nichoume theater. Kanmuri has been active as a solo project "THE冠" (The Kanmuri) since So What? broke up in 2003. Costume in The Kanmuri is derived from Raoh's steel helmet, The Road Warriors's armor, and Stan Hansen's vest. Kanmuri has been active as a stage actor, and has appeared in the R series in Gekidan☆Shinkansen. In 2007, Kanmuri was founded band "SKOMB" with Tsukasa Okazaki who charge of music of Gekidan☆shinkansen. Kanmuri sang ending song "Happy Ending" (ハッピーエンディング) in anime "Gag Manga Biyori". Kanmuri was charge of dubbing (only song) of Johannes Krauser II (ヨハネ・クラウザーII世, Yohane Kurauz? Nisei) in the film "Detroit Metal City". Kanmuri has been active as a narrator for the Japanese commercials.

In 2010, Kanmuri appeared on the variety show "Gyoretsu no dekiru houritsusoudanjyo" since Shinsuke Shimada was interested in Kanmuri who said blue joke in the variety show "Osaka hatsu shissou stage WEST WIND" in NHK. Kanmuri talked poor episodes in "Gyoretsu no dekiru houritsusoudanjyo", and rose in popularity. Five years later he made an appearance on the music program "MUSIC JAPAN" in NHK, and sang "Kizudarakeno hevymetal". In 2015, Kanmuri made his debut as a professional wrestler. In 2018, Kanmuri provided song of 120600mAh connect to The Kanmuri "HITOME VOLTAGE". Kanmuri and support member of The Kanmuri appear on music video.

== Discography ==
=== So What? ===
==== Albums ====
1. So What? – 21 September 1995
2. Fragile – 5 June 1996
3. Tsutomu－Tsutomu (努－つとむ) – 27 March 1997
4. Heal – 21 May 1998
5. Best of Iron Fist - 10 May 2001
6. Live Album Koutetsu damashii (Iron Soul) (Live ALbum 鋼鉄魂 (Iron Soul) – 2003

==== Singles ====
1. Ippatsu kamashitare (一発かましたれ, "sock somebody one") – 21 May 1996
2. Nanda!!chimiha!? (ナンだっ!!チミは!?, "What!! Are you!?") – 21 February 1997
3. Crazy cowboy (クレイジー・カウボーイ, "Crazy cowboy") – 25 August 2000

=== The Kanmuri ===
==== Albums ====
1. Kanmuri matsuri (冠祭, "Kanmuri festival") – 9 March 2005
2. Kizudarake no heavy metal (傷だらけのヘビーメタル, "Heavy metal with scar") – 18 March 2009
3. Saigo no heavy metal ～Last of the Heavy Metal～ (最後のヘビーメタル～Last of Heavy Metal～, "Heavy metal of last") – 27 October 2010
4. Shinizokonai no heavy metal (死にぞこないのヘビーメタル, "Heavy metal of dotard") – 21 March 2012
5. Kaettekita heavy metal (帰ってきたヘビーメタル, "Heavy metal came back") – 23 October 2013
6. Yoroi kabuto kusari ketu (鎧兜鎖血, "Armor chain blood") – 9 September 2015
7. Best of the Kanmuri 『niku』(Best of the Kanmuri 冠 『肉』, "Best of the Kanmuri 『flesh』") – 29 June 2016
8. Best of the Kanmuri 『hone』 (Best of The Kanmuri 冠 『骨』, "Best of the Kanmuri 『bone』") – 2 November 2016
9. Dakkan (奪冠, "Recapture") – 27 September 2017

==== Singles ====
1. New World 〜Hateshinaki koutetsuetsu no kanata he〜 (New World 〜果てしなき鋼鉄の彼方へ〜, ""New World 〜Boundless beyond the steel〜) – 15 December 2011 Venue limited sales
1. Syoshikantetsu (初志冠徹, "Carrying out one's original intention") – 21 February 2015 Venue limited sales

=== DVD ===
1. SKOMB Live – 14 July 2007
2. Mukanmuri no teiou Eien ni kamaseinu tour encore 2010 eve (無冠の帝王 ～永遠に咬ませ犬ツアーアンコール2010イブイブ～, "A king without a crown 〜Underdog of forever tour of angkor in December 23, 2010") – 27 April 2011
3. Eien no kamaseinu THE no clip syu lariat no mukougawa (永遠の咬ませ犬 THEのクリップ衆 ～ラリアットの向こう側～, "Underdog of forever clip collection of THE 〜the off side of the lariat〜") – 25 May 2011
4. 'Daikanmuri seitansai 2016 (大冠生誕祭 2016, "Big Kanmuri birth festival in 2016") – 16 July 2017 Venue limited sales
