= Nora: The Last Chronicle of Devildom =

Japanese manga series

- First volume cover

NORA-ノラ-
- Genre: Action comedy; Dark fantasy; Supernatural
- Manga
- Written by: Kazunari Kakei
- Published by: Shueisha
- English publisher: NA: Viz Media
- Magazine: Monthly Shōnen Jump
- Original run: March 6, 2004 – December 6, 2006
- Volumes: 9
- icon

Nora: The Last Chronicle of Devildom (NORA-ノラ-) is a Japanese manga series written and illustrated by Kazunari Kakei. It was serialized in Shueisha's shōnen manga magazine Monthly Shōnen Jump from March 2004 to December 2006, with its chapters collected in nine tankōbon volumes. A sequel series, Surebrec: Nora the 2nd, ran in the same magazine for five chapters from February to June 2007. Nora was licensed for English release in North America by Viz Media.

== Plot ==
In the world of the demons, the Dark Liege rules over an army of supernatural soldiers, but there is one demon that she cannot tame: the rebellious and careless Nora, a young spiky-haired demon and the most powerful under the Dark Liege's command. One day, when Nora wears out the Dark Liege's patience, she sends him to the human world to learn some manners. The Dark Liege enlists Kazuma Magari, the president of his school's student council, to rein in Nora. The Dark Liege explains that a resistance of demons has entered the human world and is hiring outlaw demons to attack humans and that Kazuma was chosen to be given a great power. She also explains that because Nora is a bit too disobedient, he entrusted control over his powers to him; in other words, Nora needs Kazuma's permission to do any magic, and if he goes out of line, Kazuma just has to say "I forbid" and Nora's magic collar will choke him. Kazuma soon finds that he will need all of Nora's powers to defeat the rival demons who are out to capture and kill them both.

== Publication ==
Written and illustrated by Kazunari Kakei, Nora: The Last Chronicle of Devildom ran for 34 chapters in Shueisha's shōnen manga magazine Monthly Shōnen Jump from March 6, 2004, (Note: The serialization started in the April 2004 issue, released on March 6 of that same year.) to December 6, 2006. (Note: It finished in the January 2007 issue released on December 6, 2006.) Shueisha collected its chapters in nine tankōbon volumes, released from September 3, 2004, to May 2, 2007. A five-chapter sequel, titled Surebrec: Nora the 2nd, was serialized in Monthly Shōnen Jump from February 6 to June 6, 2007, when the magazine ceased its publication. The volume was released on August 3, 2007.

In North America, the manga was licensed for English release by Viz Media. The nine volumes were published from October 7, 2008, to February 2, 2010. Viz Media started publishing the series digitally on November 26, 2013.

== Reception ==
In a review of the first volume, Publishers Weekly said that the story is "less compelling than other stories of a similar vein", adding that it "relies too heavily on violence and slapstick humor", also criticizing the "general lack of character development" and called the art "comical", concluding: "[it] isn't bad, but falls short in many ways." Reviewing the first volume, Ken Haley of PopCultureShock called the series "just really average", commenting that it "felt like someone took bits of Zatch Bell! and InuYasha and just cobbled something together", adding, however, that since it was Kakei's first series there was "certainly a chance that it will improve as it goes on." In his review of the first volume, Scott Campbell of Active Anime enjoyed the series, calling it "quite a mix of genres as it includes a fair bit of comedy along with adventure, fantasy, and a number of other things in between", also comparing its art, to other series like D.Gray-man and Naruto, and recommended it to fans of other Shonen Jump titles. Deb Aoki of About.com commented that Kakei "sticks close to the standard shōnen formula", calling the series "not especially original, but it's a fun, action-packed read that should satisfy most Shonen Jump fans", adding that it "offers fun, action and adventure for shōnen manga fans who need something to read while waiting for the next volume of Bleach or Naruto to arrive."
