= Gag Manga Biyori =

Japanese manga series

- Masuda Kōsuke Gekijō: Gag Manga Biyori
- First tankōbon volume cover

増田こうすけ劇場 ギャグマンガ日和 (Masuda Kōsuke Gekijō Gyagu Manga Biyori)
- Genre: Comedy
- Manga
- Written by: Kosuke Masuda
- Published by: Shueisha
- Imprint: Jump Comics
- Magazine: Monthly Shōnen Jump; (2000–2007); Jump Square; (2007–2014)
- Original run: January 2000 – November 2014
- Volumes: 15
Further information
Anime film
Gag Manga Biyori Jump Festa 2002 Special
Studio	Toei
Released	2002
Runtime	12 minutes
Anime television series
Gag Manga Biyori (S1–3); Gag Manga Biyori+ (S4); Gag Manga Biyori Go (S5)
Directed by	Akitaro Daichi
Music by	Harukichi Yamamoto
Studio	Artland (S1–2); Studio Deen (S3–5)
Licensed by	Remow
Original network	Kids Station (S1–3); Yomiuri TV (S4)
Original run	February 7, 2005 – June 21, 2025
Episodes	56
Manga
Gag Manga Biyori GB
Written by	Kosuke Masuda
Published by	Shueisha
Imprint	Jump Comics SQ.
Magazine	Jump Square
Original run	December 4, 2015 – present
Volumes	8
- icon

Masuda Kōsuke Gekijō: Gag Manga Biyori (Japanese: 増田こうすけ劇場 ギャグマンガ日和, Hepburn: Masuda Kōsuke Gekijō Gyagu Manga Biyori; lit. 'Kosuke Masuda Theater: Good Day for Gag Manga'), or simply known as Gag Manga Biyori, is a Japanese manga series written and illustrated by Kosuke Masuda. The series features a hyperactive, random, and nonsensical style that revolves around various plots and characters throughout.

It started in Shueisha's shōnen manga magazine Monthly Shōnen Jump in the January 2000 issue. The magazine ceased publication in June 2007, and the series was transferred to the then-brand new magazine Jump Square in November of the same year, where it was published until November 2014. Shueisha collected its chapters in fifteen tankōbon volumes. The manga continued in Jump Square, under the title Gag Manga Biyori GB, in December 2014.

Its first anime adaptation was a short film animated by Toei as part of Jump Festa in 2002. The first anime television series adaptation and the sequel were produced by Artland, while the third, fourth and fifth sequel were produced by Studio Deen. Most episodes are five minutes long. The first four series aired in 2005, 2006, 2008, and 2010, and the fifth series aired in 2025.

== Overview ==
Gag Manga Biyori is a nonsensical comedy series known for its bizarre plot setups and non-sequitur humor. It has also been described as a "Monty Python-esque weirdness." In the anime adaptation, its various characters are mostly voiced by Yūji Ueda, Kaori Nazuka and Takeshi Maeda.

== Media ==
=== Manga ===
Written and illustrated by Kosuke Masuda, Gag Manga Biyori debuted in Shueisha's shōnen manga magazine Monthly Shōnen Jump in the January 2000 issue. The magazine ceased its publication on June 6, 2007. Following a brief run in Weekly Shōnen Jump from August 27 to October 29, 2007, the series was transferred to the then brand new magazine Jump Square on November 2 of the same year. In October 2014, it was announced that the series would change its title to coincide with its 15th anniversary, being serialized under the title Gag Manga Biyori until November 4 of the same year. Shueisha collected its chapters in fifteen tankōbon volumes, released from September 4, 2000, to October 3, 2014.

The series continued in Jump Square, under the title Masuda Kōsuke Gekijō Gag Manga Biyori GB (増田こうすけ劇場 ギャグマンガ日和GB), starting on December 4, 2014. Shueisha released its first tankōbon volume on December 4, 2015. As of August 2, 2024, eight volumes have been released.

=== Anime ===
An anime television series adaptation, produced by Artland (first two series) and Studio Deen (third series onwards) were broadcast on Kids Station; the first 12-episode series aired from February 7 to April 25, 2005; the second 12-episode series was broadcast from August 5 to October 28, 2006; and the third series aired from March 17 to June 2, 2008. The fourth 26-episode series, Gag Manga Biyori+, was first broadcast on Yomiuri TV from January 5 to June 29, 2010. A fifth series, Gag Manga Biyori Go, aired from April 5 to June 21, 2025.

Remow licensed all five series.

==== Episodes ====
===== Series 1 (2005) =====
No.	Title	Original release date
1	"Stickers/Stickers 2"; Transliteration: "Shīru/Shīru 2" (Japanese: シール/シール2)	February 7, 2005
The CEO of the Uki-Uki Confectionery complains to his product development team about a chocolate snack that is selling poorly because the promotions all depict a depressed boy. In the second part, the CEO of the Macho Bread Corp. complains to an artist because the promotions for their latest snack focus on one character at the expense of others.
2	"Yang-Ti gets angry! The Sovereign Letter"; Transliteration: "Yōdai ikaru kokushohen" (Japanese: 煬帝怒る 国書編)	February 14, 2005
Prince Shōtoku along with Ono no Imoko have become Kenzuishi, imperial consuls to China. They were to meet the Chinese Emperor Yang of Sui and were heading to Luoyang by ship. They are, however, suffering from long-term travel insanity.
3	"Yang-Ti gets angry! Luoyang's Volume"; Transliteration: "Yōdai ikaru rakuyōhen" (Japanese: 煬帝怒る 洛陽編)	February 21, 2005
Prince Shōtoku and Ono no Imoko arrive at their destination: Luoyang. They go to meet the Chinese Emperor Yang of Sui (who is really an alien from the planet Octopus pretending to be human and manipulating the people's minds) to give him the letter from the Emperor of Japan. However, in doing so, things go quickly and horribly wrong.
4	"The End"; Transliteration: "Shūmatsu" (Japanese: 終末)	February 28, 2005
It is only three more mere hours till a giant meteor hits the Earth, wiping out all life forever. The world is in total chaos and insanity with the knowledge that in three hours the apocalypse will come. A TV station has invited four celebrities to talk about the end of the planet Earth; they are also affected by the worldwide chaos, as they show their true colors.
5	"Down the Narrow Road, Episode I"; Transliteration: "Oku no hoshomichi episōdo I" (Japanese: 奥の細道 エピソードI)	March 7, 2005
In 1689, the well-known poet (and wimpy looney) Matsuo Bashō took his apprentice, the "apprentice-teaches-master" Sora, and begins his journey on the narrow road of the deep north. This is the beginning of their story—and, in extension, their madness.
6	"Harris Impact—Surprise Plan"; Transliteration: "HARRIS IMPACT BIKKURI daisakusen" (Japanese: ハリスインパクト ビックリ大作戦)	March 14, 2005
Consulate Townsend Harris and his Hollander personal secretary Heusken go to Japan to finalize the Treaty of Peace and Commerce. However, Harris is more absorbed in his plan to leave a historic impact to the Japanese—something that only results in madness. He made a plan for their trip in Edo—which is actually insane pictures of his visions of failure and success, including a drawing of Heusken smiling—while blood is flowing down from his mouth.
7	"Harris Impact—Chapter Marching in" Transliteration: "HARRIS IMPACT norikomihen" (Japanese: ハリスインパクト 乗り込み編)	March 21, 2005
Harris and Heusken are ready to finalize the treaty, and they are going with a strange vehicle that Harris already made. Will Heusken survive this abominable invention? Will the treaty be passed? Or is this the ultimate death knell for the Treaty of Peace and Commerce—and the world's sanity?
8	"Go Omusubi-kun/Light Speed Rider Mach Ryou"; Transliteration: "Dokkoi omusubi-kun/Kōsoku RIDER MACH Ryō" (Japanese: どっこいおむすび君/光速ライダー マッハ涼)	March 28, 2005
The first part of this episode is a Doraemon parody about an alien called Omusubi-kun and the boy he lives with, Hebota, as they live together until Omusubi-kun, after having his insides revealed, leaves the planet Earth for good. The second part is about Mach Ryou, a motorbike racer who raced against a punk over a girl at the deadly cliff road. The resulting race escalates into an all-out cliff joyride as Ryou and the punk race for the ultimate prize.
9	"Birth of the magical girl" Transliteration: "Mahō shōjo tanjō" (Japanese: 魔法少女誕生)	April 4, 2005
The Ramen Fairy, one of the fairies that are sent to the degenerating Japan by the Queen of Fairies, is found by a girl inside a ramen cup—with a chopstick-stabbing first contact. He asks the girl to become a magical girl—which, however, yields unexpectedly disastrous results.
10	"Journey to the West: The end of the journey" Transliteration: "Saiyūuki: tabi no owari" (Japanese: 西遊記 〜旅の終わり〜)	April 11, 2005
Tang Sanzang and his comrades are at the end of their journey to India, and they are racing to reach the goal first. Tang Sanzang tries to keep his comrades from cheating by reminding them of their dead friend Zhu Bajie. However, during these events, total chaos erupts and the truth about how Zhu Bajie died is revealed.
11	"I am dead and I scream at the sun/Unlucky friends" Transliteration: "Shinda watashi wa taiyō ni hoeru/UNLUCKY FRIENDS" (Japanese: 死んだ私は太陽にほえる/アンラッキーフレンズ)	April 18, 2005
Sayuri, who died due to a falling swordfish piercing her stomach when saving a cat holding that swordfish from being run over by a car, asks the Grim Reaper to let her come to life again for a few seconds to say the words she wishes to be her last words—however, stomachache and interference by a teacher named Gorimatsu led to botched attempts of saying "What the hell is that?!" as her last words. The second part is about a girl called Ishii who has gone to college, living on her own, and sees her friends and neighbors fall from their weakening balconies while she is running home—the casualty toll increases till she is the last one to fall from her own balcony.
12	"You're a detective Usami-chan?/She's a great detective!" Transliteration: "Usami-chan—Meitanteissuka! Usami-chan/Meitantei da mono! Usami-chan" (Japanese: 名探偵っスか!うさみちゃん/名探偵だもの!うさみちゃん)	April 25, 2005
This final episode of the season is about Usami-chan, a rabbit girl who is known for her detective abilities and sharp intuition that expose criminals. She solves unusual and perverted cases that happen around her and her prime suspect, the bear boy Kumakichi.

===== Series 2 (2006) =====
No.	Title	Original release date
1	"It's the detective! Usami-chan"; Transliteration: "Meitantei dazoe! Usami-chan" (Japanese: 名探偵だぞえ! うさみちゃん)	August 5, 2006
Usami-chan, the detective rabbit girl, continues solving more far out of the ordinary and perverted cases in her school, this time with the help of the transfer student Pensuke-kun – whose detective abilities involve exposing his downright hideous teeth.
2	"The private tutor won't come!" Transliteration: "Konai yo! Kateikyōshi" (Japanese: 来ないよ! 家庭教師)	August 12, 2006
A father of the family hired a private tutor for his son, tempted by the fact that the tutors were advertised as hot college girls. There is only one major problem, though: the private tutor does not come despite repeated phone calls, cakes, meditation, etc. by the father and son for several days.
3	"Prince Shōtoku's Fun Wooden Building"; Transliteration: "Shōtoku Taishi no tanoshii mokuzō kenchiku" (Japanese: 聖徳太子の楽しい木造建築)	August 19, 2006
Prince Shōtoku returns from his trip to China and after the Luoyang incident to check on the construction progress of the Hōryū-ji temple, only to find it to be still on the planning stage. He forces the only worker to finish the building in a day—although in a severely altered form—so he can invite Ono no Imoko over—however, that action would be the last for both of them.
4	"Neko-chan's Abs/Family with quintuplets" Transliteration: "Neko-chan no fukin/Itsutsugo daikasoku" (Japanese: ネコちゃんの腹筋/5つ子大家族)	August 26, 2006
The first part is about a humanoid cat who trains his abdominal muscles, but he broke them when training using a basketball, so he shared the muscles with his grandmother in order to recoup his ab losses. The second part is about a television crew trying to film the quintuplets of a family by all means and at all costs, who appear to be far, far more hyperactive than usual.
5	"Fight, Urashima Tarō!"; Transliteration: "Ganbare Urashima Tarō" (Japanese: がんばれ浦島太郎)	September 2, 2006
Urashima saves a turtle and gets invited to the Ryūgū-jō, where, to the dismay of Urashima, the princess Otohime despised him and gave him the lowest quality service possible—just to drive him insane.
6	"Swordmaster Yamato (Typos)/Swordmaster Yamato (End)"; Transliteration: "Sōdomasutaa Yamato (Goshoku hen)/Sōdomasutaa Yamato (Kanketsu hen)" (Japanese: ソードマスターヤマト(誤植編)/ソードマスターヤマト(完結編))	September 9, 2006
In the first part, a manga artist phones his editor to complain about the outrageous typos that appeared on his manga, Swordmaster Yamato. In the second part, a new editor, Takara-san, phones the manga artist to tell him that his manga has to end abruptly because of its low popularity, despite the story becoming intense. The manga artist is allowed three pages to end it—which, for a manga becoming intense, is absolute madness to the manga artist.
7	"The Mogami River, gathering rain of May and even more rapid" Transliteration: "Samidare wo atsumete hayashi Mogamigawa" (Japanese: 五月雨をあつめて早し最上川)	September 16, 2006
Taking up where Episode 1 left off, Matsuo Bashō and his apprentice Sora continue their journey to the North, this time crossing Mogami River. Still suffering from his inferiority complex, thinking he is strong enough to block the river, and having seen his teddy bear sabotaged by Sora, Matsuo jumps into the rapid river, causing more insanity than ever before.
8	"Akio—You still live inside my heart/Goodbye, Grandpa"; Transliteration: "Akio ~kono mune no naka ni mada ikiteiru~/Sayonara ojii-chan" (Japanese: 明男 〜この胸の中にまだ生きている〜/さよならおじいちゃん)	September 23, 2006
This episode involves the tragic, inevitable and final moment in life that is death. In the first half, Reiko-chan must cope with the death of Akio, a weird, four-legged, three-eyed, severely malfunctioning robot she loved so much, with her still functioning partner, the centauroid Mamoru, which, of course, also suffers from the same symptoms Akio did. On the second half, the grandfathergrand of a family, with his time running out, recalls the memories he had with his old friends—only to encounter severe and weird anomalies.
9	"Eyepatch -Real Momotarō-/Ikkyū-san/Forbidden Canadajare BEST5"; Transliteration: "Gantai -shin Momotarō-/Ikkyū-san/Kindn no Kanadajre BEST5" (Japanese: 眼帯 —真桃太郎—/一休さん/禁断のカナダジャレBEST5)	September 30, 2006
An elderly couple slices open a giant peach and finds Date Masamune's eyepatch inside; they fight over it while keeping it a secret to the one-eyed First Lord of Sendai, who comes looking for his lost eyepatch—and became a public laughingstock with his flower replacement. The second part reveals that the witty Ikkyū gets his inspiration by summoning the god of wit. This time, however, the god of sexual harassment gets summoned instead when Ikkyū is tested by a daimyō, resulting in a pretty awkward situation. The final part is a list of dajare.
10	"The legend of the manga prep school: Hurricane Jun"; Transliteration: "Manga senmon gakkou densetsu harikeen Jun" (Japanese: マンガ専門学校伝説ハリケーン準)	October 7, 2006
Wherever there is corrupt manga forces causing madness and chaos, Hurricane Jun, the so-called "legend of the manga prep school", will be there to stop it before it's too late—using powerful manga pages that turns the pain involved in them into reality for the enemy.
11	"Black Mountain Climbing"; Transliteration: "Kuro tozan" (Japanese: 黒登山)	October 14, 2006
A student gets immediately forced into his teacher's "black mountain climbing" club, where its members (just the two of them) do erratic and weird things to distract other mountaineers, putting them in grave danger in the process. Public reaction is, if you're familiar with weird situations, all too typical.
12	"Love E"; Transliteration: "Ravu e" (Japanese: ラヴ江)	October 21, 2006
A single man buys a robot girlfriend for himself, but, it turns out the product was not like what he expected – resembling a trash can on wheels instead of a real gynoid. The robot then proceeds to help him get a real girlfriend, scaring random bystanders and causing pretty severe damage to his physical health in the process.

===== Series 3 (2008) =====
No.	Title	Original release date
1	"Hirata's World/Speak of the detective! Usami-chan"; Transliteration: "Hirata no Sekai/Meitantei to ieba! Usami-chan" (Japanese: 平田の世界/名探偵と言えば!うさみちゃん)	March 17, 2008
Hirata came to a realization that he is only a manga character in a barren world, he hopes for a rival to appear like in typical Shōnen manga, and he was granted one—wearing panties on his head. After frequent appearances made by other, weird creatures and supposedly defeating the evil lord, Hirata came to the slow—and awkward—realization that he is actually in a gag manga. The second part continues Usami-chan's adventures in solving more perverted cases in the school.
2	"The Wonders of the Sympetrum/It's the detective! Usami-chan"; Transliteration: "Akantonbo no fushigi/Meitantei dazoe! Usami-chan" (Japanese: アカトンボのふしぎ/名探偵だぞえ! うさみちゃん)	March 24, 2008
In the first part, a perverted professor gives a lesson about meadowhawks—with pretty mixed results. In the second part, Usami-chan and friends try to cheer Penske-kun up since he became quickly disliked for his hideous teeth.
3	"One week of Shōtoku"; Transliteration: "Shōtoku isshūkan" (Japanese: 聖徳1週間)	March 31, 2008
Prince Shōtoku digs up a pitfall trap, which he hopes that Ono no Imoko will fall into. However, Ono no Imoko happens to see him laying this trap and spends the whole week spying on Prince Shōtoku as he waits for Imoko to fall into the trap. Also of interest to note, there is a new Japanese voice actor for Ono no Imoko in this episode.
4	"Magnificent Yoga/Is she really a detective! Usami-chan"; Transliteration: "Subarashiki Yoga/Meitantei kashira! Usami-chan" (Japanese: すばらしきヨガ/名探偵かしら!うさみちゃん)	April 7, 2008
In the first part, a poor Yoga master must beg a gangster father for forgiveness, when his son accidentally injures the gangster's son. He is unable to beg successfully and ends up doing random Yoga poses instead, which enrages the gangster father even more. In the second part, Usami-chan tries to figure out who has stolen Nyanmi-chan's bulma—till the usual suspect is revealed.
5	"Inō Tadataka's Walk"; Transliteration: "Inō Tadataka no Ayumi" (Japanese: 伊能忠敬の歩み)	April 14, 2008
This episode follows Inō Tadataka as he goes on his journey to complete the map of Japan. In the process he meets up with a sickly dog, an out-of-this-world alien, and a strange old lady. Much hilarity and chaos ensues.
6	"Lala's Beautiful Reality/A Selection of Holy Virtue Riddles"; Transliteration: "Rara-bi Riariti/Seitoku Nazonazo Kessaku" (Japanese: ララ美リアリティ/聖徳なぞなぞ傑作選)	April 21, 2008
7	"Forever Hunter-MASUDA/Super Combined Warrior SanGoto V Opening Theme"; Transliteration: "FōebāhantāーMASUDA/Chō Gattai Senshi Sangoddo V Ōpuningutēma" (Japanese: フォーエバーハンターMASUDA/超合体戦士サンゴッドVオープニングテーマ)	April 28, 2008
In the first part of this episode, the sly, fly Masuda rescues a damsel in distress all the while teaching a brutish punk a lesson in humiliation. The second involves with the 3rd member of the SanGoto V team and the chain of events that leads him to transform from sore loser to the main villain.
8	"Season of Love!! Cupid-kun"; Transliteration: "Koi no Kisetsu!! Kyūpiddo-kun" (Japanese: 恋の季節!!キューピッド君)	May 5, 2008
A deranged, out-of-control, perverted cupid, a man attempting to make love with his girlfriend, only to end up either sabotaged and arrowed by the cupid, turning him into a centaur—a sure-fire case of Valentine's Day Syndrome.
9	"Non-stop Matsuo Bashō"; Transliteration: "Nonstoppu Matsuo Bashō" (Japanese: ノンストップ松尾芭蕉)	May 12, 2008
After accidentally eating a poisonous mushroom after being bashed by Sora away, Matsuo suffers the ultimately worst case of insanity known to mankind—something that will jeopardize the peaceful meeting with the local daimyō in the area, resulting in non-stop Matsuo-style madness.
10	"Make a Decision!! Sparkling Shot"; Transliteration: "Kimero! Kirameki Shūto" (Japanese: 決めろ!!キラメキシュート)	May 19, 2008
Following the fallout from the cancelled Swordmaster Yamato last season, the manga artist decides to create a new one, titled "The Super Shooting of the Kirameki", which involves a soccer boy named Kirameki Shoot. However, interference by the head editor and weird ideas, including the dreaded 3-page restriction, melt together to form the ultimate in weird manga, involving moe catgirls, yuurei, soccer boy rivals, and weeds gone wrong.
11	"Sukeban Detective Part 1"; Transliteration: "Sukeban Tantei Zenpen" (Japanese: スケバン探偵 前編)	May 26, 2008
As the latest action heroine, Warrior Idol Yoko-chan, is about to make her live-action debut, the studio crew decide it is high time they have rented a stunt double gynoid to do the dirty stunt work for her. What they are about to get will be a malfunctioning, nonsense-vomiting defect that will turn her debut upside down.
12	"Sukeban Detective Part 2"; Transliteration: "Sukeban Tantei Kōhen" (Japanese: スケバン探偵 後編)	June 2, 2008

===== Gag Manga Biyori+ (2010) =====
No.	Title	Original release date
1	"Renoir vs Cezanne"; Transliteration: "Runowaaru VS Sezannu" (Japanese: ルノワールVSセザ)	January 5, 2010
2	"Let's Go to the Bath!"; Transliteration: "Sentou Ni Iko U" (Japanese: 銭湯に行こう)	January 19, 2010
3	"Shinsengumi -The Incident at Ikeda's-/The Chronicles of Matsuo Basho"; Transliteration: "Shinsengumi – Ikeda Ya Jiken / Matsuo Bashou Shouto" (Japanese: 新撰組—池田屋事件— / 松尾芭蕉ショート)	February 2, 2010
4	"Supersized Warrior Mentallion"; Transliteration: "Kyo Juusenshi Mentarion" (Japanese: 巨重戦士メンタリオン)	February 16, 2010
5	"My BFF the Werewolf"; Transliteration: "Shinyuu Ha Ookamiotoko" (Japanese: 親友は狼男)	March 2, 2010
6	"Mecha Matsuo"; Transliteration: "Mekamatsuo" (Japanese: メカマツオ)	March 16, 2010
7	"A Lovey-Love Song For You"; Transliteration: "Koi No Rabusongu Wo Kun Ni" (Japanese: 恋のラブソングを君に)	April 13, 2010
8	"Perry Gets No Respect!"; Transliteration: "Namerare Perii" (Japanese: なめられペリー)	May 4, 2010
9	"The Raging Alien"; Transliteration: "Kyoubou Eirian" (Japanese: 凶暴エイリアン)	May 18, 2010
10	"Mt. Fuji"; Transliteration: "Fujisan" (Japanese: 富士山)	June 1, 2010
11	"Cause She's a Great Detective! Usami-chan"; Transliteration: "Meitantei Nanode! Usamichan" (Japanese: 名探偵なので！うさみちゃん)	June 15, 2010
12	"The Tales of Onmyoji"; Transliteration: "Onmyoujii Monogatari" (Japanese: 陰陽師物語)	June 29, 2010

===== Gag Manga Biyori Go (2025) =====
No.	Title	Original release date
1	"Super Detective Usami-Chan"; Transliteration: "Sūpā Tantei Usa Michan" (Japanese: スーパー探偵うさみちゃん)	April 4, 2025
2	"The Bremen Town Musicians"; Transliteration: "Burēmen no Ongaku-Tai" (Japanese: ブレーメンの音楽隊)	April 11, 2025
3	"The Narrow Road to Oku Episode 2: Departure / Lost on the Narrow Road"; Transliteration: "Oku no Hosomichi Dai 2-wa `Tabidachi/ Hosomichi Mayoi'" (Japanese: 奥の細道 第2話「旅立ち / 細道迷い」)	April 18, 2025
4	"Mahjong"; Transliteration: "Mājan" (Japanese: 麻雀)	April 25, 2025
5	"The Beam From Taishi's Forehead"; Transliteration: "Taishi no Gaku Kara Deru Hari" (Japanese: 太子の額から出る梁)	May 2, 2025
6	"Hansel and Gretel"; Transliteration: "Henzeru to Gurēteru" (Japanese: ヘンゼルとグレーテル)	May 9, 2025
7	"Idol Group"; Transliteration: "Aidorugurūpu" (Japanese: アイドルグループ)	May 16, 2025
8	"Taishi's Rokkaku-do"; Transliteration: "Shōtoku Taishi no Rokkaku-dō" (Japanese: 聖徳太子の六角堂)	May 23, 2025
9	"Bad Cats -BAD CATS-"; Transliteration: "Baddo・Kyatsu -BAD CATS-" (バッド・キャッツ -BAD CATS-)	May 30, 2025
10	"The Narrow Road to Oku: The Last Spurt"; Transliteration: "Oku no Hosomichi Rasuto Supāto" (奥の細道ラストスパート)	June 6, 2025
11	"Onmyoji Detective vs School Ghost Stories"; Transliteration: "In'yōshi Tantei Tai Gakkō no Kaidan" (陰陽師探偵対学校の怪談)	June 13, 2025
12	"The Great Detective! Usami-chan-Goodbye Kumakichi-Kun/Usami-Chan is a Great Detective After All!"; Transliteration: "Mei Tantei to Oboshiki! Usa Michan-Sayonara Kuma Kichikun/Yappari Mei Tantei! Usa Michan" (名探偵とおぼしき!うさみちゃん-さよならクマ吉くん- / やっぱり名探偵!うさみちゃん)	June 20, 2025

==== Theme songs ====
Opening

- "Attack! Gyagu Manga Biyori" (アタック!ギャグマンガ日和; lit. 'Attack! Good Day for Gag Manga') by Yuji Ueda (season 1)
- "Oahu! Hawaii Biyori" (オアフ! ハワイ日和; lit. 'Oahu! Good Day for Hawaii') by Yuji Ueda and Kaori Nazuka (season 2)
- "Body line" (ボディライン) by Yuji Ueda (season 3)
- "Kibō no Uchū no..." (希望の宇宙の・・・; lit. 'The Aspiration of Space's...') by Yuji Ueda (Gag Manga Biyori +)
- "Bokutachi no Gag Manga Biyori" (僕達のギャグマンガ日和) by Yuji Ueda (Gag Manga Biyori Go)

Ending

- "Happy Ending" (ハッピーエンディング) by Tetsuya Kanmuri
- "Happy Go Lucky Ending" (ハッピーゴーラッキーエンディング) by Tetsuya Kanmuri (Gag Manga Biyori +)
- "Happy Go Go Lucky Ending" (ハッピーゴーゴーラッキーエンディング) by Tetsuya Kanmuri (Gag Manga Biyori Go)
