= Futaba-kun Change! =

Manga

- Cover of the first Japanese volume of Futaba-kun Change

ふたば君チェンジ (Futaba-kun Chenji)
- Genre: Romantic comedy; Science fiction
- Manga
- Written by: Hiroshi Aro
- Published by: Shueisha
- English publisher: NA: Studio Ironcat
- Imprint: Jump Comics
- Magazine: Monthly Shōnen Jump; Monthly Shōnen Jump Original
- Original run: December 1990 – March 1997
- Volumes: 8

Futaba-kun Change (Japanese: ふたば君チェンジ, Hepburn: Futaba-kun Chenji) is a Japanese manga series written and illustrated by Hiroshi Aro. Fast-paced, madcap and relatively mature in themes, it is usually comedic, with occasional elements of romance. Aro admitted that he created the series to be his version of Rumiko Takahashi's Ranma ½. In Japan, the manga began serialization in the December 1990 issue of the Shueisha magazine Monthly Shōnen Jump. It switched to the sister publication Monthly Shōnen Jump Original in 1993 and ended in the March 1997 issue. A total of eight tankōbon (bound volumes) collecting the chapters were released by Shueisha between 1991 and 1997, but it is now out of print. Futaba-kun Change was licensed by Studio Ironcat in the United States, but as the company went out of business their release is also out of print. Currently, the manga is available digitally on Kindle, with a different translation from Studio Ironcat's. The manga, however, has had some of its content edited.

== Plot ==
Futaba Shimeru is a normal junior high-schooler living a normal life at Komattane combined junior-senior high school (駒種中等学, Komattane chūtō-gaku), active in his school's wrestling club and slowly getting closer to his awkward love interest, Misaki. This fails to last as he discovers his family's hereditary genetic defect that becomes active at adolescence. Although it will eventually become controllable, either excitement or stress now makes Futaba switch sex. Hilarity ensues. The general status quo of the storyline, tone and atmosphere is maintained until volume 6, at which point Misaki discovers Futaba's secret.

In volume 8, the manga abruptly changes from light comedy to serious science fiction. Futaba, Misaki and Kurin are taken by aliens that explain that the Shimeru family are not merely bizarrely mutated but descendants of a space crash 12 to 13 thousand years ago. They are taken to the star system they originated from to see a structure much like a Dyson sphere, but see that the entire race has been annihilated. Determined to find a less tragic future, they return to Earth. Eight years have passed, all their friends and family have happy lives (Motomura and Nigiri have gotten married and Futana is a celebrity playboy), the Shimeru clan have spread throughout the world, and their condition is now widely known and accepted.

== Characters ==
Futaba Shimeru (締留ふたば, Shimeru Futaba)
The lead character of the story, he's stunned to learn that not only will he change into a girl when he becomes excited, but somehow he failed to notice that all of the other members of his family switch sex as well. His new female form is just as strong as his male form, and has a power of attraction that quickly launches her into a career as a Japanese idol. His family name is a reference to the word futanari.
Misaki Shima (島美咲姫, Shima Misaki)
Futaba's love interest, the fact that he turns into a girl when he becomes aroused places a seemingly insurmountable barrier to their relationship. Her cooking is intolerably sweet to anyone else, and she is very superstitious. After she switches from swimming club to wrestling club so her new friend "Futaba-chan" will not be the only girl in it, there is a joke about how it turns out that none of the other swimmers actually know how to swim in regular water that is not filled with dissolved sugar from Misaki's sugar-filled body. Her family has a little connection to the Shimeru clan.
Futana Shimeru (締留双菜, Shimeru Futana)
Futaba's sister who in her male form makes the most out of her powers of attraction, by seducing countless girls and probably a few boys as well. She does not use birth control, and leaves a small army of sex-shifting offspring behind. She also gropes Futaba, but probably more for the amusement value of watching his reactions than genuine interest since it does not cause her to shift sex. Futana genuinely loves both sexes, even to the point of shape shifting in front of Futaba whom he tricked to do sexy poses.
Kurin Shimeru (締留倶鈴, Shimeru Kurin)
A very important member of the main Shimeru family which has arranged for her engagement to Futaba. Imperious and pushy she is initially contemptuous of her fiance until she learns that he's also the famous Futaba-chan and that he's already interested in someone else, at which point she desperately tries to win his affection. In her female form, she is short and unattractive, but her male form is tall, handsome and surrounded by a cloud of pheromones that leave women awestruck. She uses this power to get free food since the transformation makes her extremely hungry.
Motomura (本村)
The president of the wrestling club, Motomura is a large and impressive manly figure but is easily moved to tears in his excesses of emotion. He is also a compulsive gambler and Negiri takes great advantage of his weakness.
Takeru (武流)
Another member of the wrestling club, he's the weakest wrestler among them, and a would-be lothario.
Chima (地真)
The last member of the wrestling club, he takes the Japanese cliché of nosebleeds due to sexual arousal to exaggerated lengths, even using it as a weapon in a martial arts tournament.
Kahoru Iroka (伊炉華かほる, Iroka Kahoru)
A famous actress/model, s/he is the person Futaba thought of as his father, although he actually gave birth to Futaba. Iroka pushes Futaba to follow in her footsteps as Futaba-chan.
Negiri Shusendou (酒仙洞音霧, Shusendō Negiri)
Misaki Shima's friend, she takes control of both the wrestling club and Futaba-chan's idol career because Motomura and Futaba are both easily taken advantage of. Negiri is Futaba-kun's equivalent of Nabiki Tendo and speaks using Kansai turns of phrase.
Principal Hiroin (緋楼院, Hirōin)
A small man with an over-sized head, Principal Hiroin is somewhat mad. Whenever he sees someone in trouble he changes into one of his superhero costumes (modelled on Japanese superheroes) and appears to attempt to save the day. He is aware of Futaba's double identity and arranged for both identities to be students at the school, which has many secret cubbyholes where Futaba (and Principal Hiroin) can change identities without being seen. His daughter, Takane, is secretly Queen X and playacts at supervillainy just as he plays at superheroics.
