= Hiroyuki Asada =

Japanese manga artist

- Born: February 15, 1968 (age 58); Yokohama, Kanagawa, Japan
- Occupation: Manga artist
- Known for: Tegami Bachi

Hiroyuki Asada (浅田 弘幸, Asada Hiroyuki; born February 15, 1968 in Yokohama, Kanagawa, Japan) is a Japanese manga artist who is best known for his gaslamp fantasy series Tegami Bachi ("Letter Bee"). The first manga series he created was called I'll, and was a basketball series. All of Asada's manga were serialized in the monthly shōnen anthology Monthly Shōnen Jump (which has since been discontinued; Tegami Bachi now appears in its replacement Jump Square). He made his debut in 1986. He acquired a fanbase with Mint: Sleeping Rabbit, Renka by degrees, and his popularity improved with I'll. In his personal life, he is part of a unit with Shou Tajima (best known for Psych) and Takeshi Obata (best known for Hikaru no Go and Death Note), and his creation activity with "AQUARIOS 3".

== Works ==
=== Manga ===
- Hades (oneshot)
- Bad da ne Yoshiokun!
- Mint: Sleeping Rabbit
- Renka
- Indian Summer (oneshot)
- I'll
- Tegami Bachi
- Pez (oneshot)

=== Other works ===
- Cheer Boys!! (anime, original character designs, 2016)
- Akanesasu Shōjo (multimedia franchise, character designs and concept art, 2018)
- Dororo (2019) (anime, original character designs, 2019)

=== Miscellaneous Illustrations ===
- Provided an illustration for the TV Anime based on Sayonara, Zetsubou-Sensei shown at the end of the eighth episode of Zan: Sayonara, Zetsubou-Sensei.
