= Ii Yu da ne! =

Japanese manga series

- First tankōbon volume cover

いいゆだね!
- Genre: Comedy
- Manga
- Written by: Osamu Akimoto
- Published by: Shueisha
- Magazine: Ultra Jump
- Original run: March 18, 2017 – June 19, 2019
- Volumes: 2
- icon

Ii Yu da ne! (いいゆだね!; "What a Nice Bath!") is a Japanese manga series written and illustrated by Osamu Akimoto. Firstly published as a three-one-shot story in Shueisha's seinen manga magazine Super Jump in 1994, it was serialized in Ultra Jump from March 2017 to June 2019, with its chapters collected in two tankōbon volumes.

== Publication ==
Written and illustrated by Osamu Akimoto, Ii Yu da ne! was originally published as a three-one-shot story in Shueisha's seinen manga magazine Super Jump in 1994. It was years later serialized in Ultra Jump (serving as a sequel to KochiKame: Tokyo Beat Cops) from March 18, 2017, to June 19, 2019. Shueisha collected its chapters in two tankōbon volumes, released on April 19, 2018, and August 19, 2019.

=== Volumes ===
No.	Japanese release date	Japanese ISBN
1	April 19, 2018	978-4-08-891001-7
2	August 19, 2019	978-4-08-891359-9
