= Tegami Bachi =

Japanese manga series

- First tankōbon volume cover, featuring Lag Seeing (front) and Gauche Suede (back)

テガミバチ
- Genre: Adventure; Science fantasy; Steampunk
- Manga
- Written by: Hiroyuki Asada
- Published by: Shueisha
- English publisher: NA: Viz Media
- Imprint: Jump Comics
- Magazine: Monthly Shōnen Jump; (2006–2007); Jump Square; (2007–2015)
- English magazine: NA: Shonen Jump
- Original run: September 6, 2006 – November 4, 2015
- Volumes: 20
- Original video animation

Tegami Bachi: Hikari to Ao no Gensou Yawa
- Directed by: Mamoru Kanbe
- Produced by: Kazuteru Oshikiri; Tetsurou Saitou
- Written by: Tetsuya Ooishi
- Music by: Kunihiko Ryo
- Studio: Pierrot+
- Released: November 24, 2008
- Runtime: 27 minutes
- Anime television series
- Directed by: Akira Iwanaga
- Produced by: Kazuteru Oshikiri; Noriko Kobayashi; Satoshi Adachi
- Written by: Tetsuya Ooishi (S1); Masanao Akahoshi (S2)
- Music by: Kunihiko Ryo
- Studio: Pierrot+
- Licensed by: NA: Sentai Filmworks
- Original network: TV Tokyo
- English network: SEA: Animax Asia
- Original run: October 3, 2009 – March 26, 2011
- Episodes: 50 + 25 OVA
- icon

Tegami Bachi (テガミバチ; "Letter Bee") is a Japanese manga series written and illustrated by Hiroyuki Asada. It was first serialized in Shueisha's shōnen manga magazine Monthly Shōnen Jump from September 2006 to June 2007; after the magazine ceased publication, it was transferred to Jump Square, where it ran from November 2007 to November 2015. Its chapters were collected in 20 tankōbon volumes. The series is set in AmberGround, a land illuminated by an artificial sun, and follows Lag Seeing, a Letter Bee with the ability to see the memories of people and objects, and his personal Dingo Niche on their journeys across AmberGround.

Tegami Bachi was adapted into an anime television series by Pierrot+, which aired for two seasons from October 2009 to March 2011. The manga was licensed for English release in North America by Viz Media; it was published in their Shonen Jump magazine, and they have released its 20 volumes. Both seasons of the anime series have been licensed by Sentai Filmworks.

== Plot ==
The story takes place in AmberGround, a land of perpetual night partially illuminated by an artificial sun. Lag Seeing, who used to work for the Bee Hive delivery service, is appointed as a Letter Bee, traveling with his Dingo (Bee's bodyguards), Niche, and her pet, Steak, to deliver letters and packages while avoiding the Gaichuu—giant armored insects who feed on the "heart" within letters and packages. When he was a child, his mother was kidnapped by men from AmberGround's capital, Akatsuki, and he was sent as a "delivery" to his aunt thanks to Gauche Suede, whom he began to idolize and who was his inspiration for becoming a Letter Bee. After Lag becomes a Letter Bee, he learns that Gauche has disappeared as the resistance movement Reverse begins stealing letters from traveling Bees. Lag later encounters Gauche, who is devoted to Reverse's cause and seems to have no memory of his past, despite Lag's attempts to make him remember.

== Characters ==
Lag Seeing (ラグ・シーイング, Ragu Shīingu)
Voiced by: Miyuki Sawashiro
Lag Seeing is a determined 12-year-old boy born on the Day of Flicker. He wields the Shindanjuu, a specialized gun that fires "Akabari" (Red Needles) using fragments of the heart. His left eye, made of red Spirit Amber, enhances his marksmanship and allows him to project heart bullets. This same ability lets him visualize the memories of objects. In his childhood, his mother was taken by men from Akatsuki, the capital of AmberGround, and an encounter with the Letter Bee Gauche Suede inspired him to follow the same path. He initially carries an antique revolver but later inherits Gauche's Nocturne #20. During a critical moment, Lag awakens a new power, his body glowing like Spirit Amber as he fires a special bullet in an attempt to restore Noir's heart. His companion, Niche, joins him after he saves her from a Gaichuu and she glimpses his memories through the Shindanjuu.
Niche (ニッチ, Nicchi)
Voiced by: Ayumi Fujimura
Niche is Lag's Dingo, traveling with her pet Steak. She wields her "Golden Sword" hair as razor-sharp blades and has bear-like claws. Found as an undeliverable letter at a train station, Lag names her Niche after rescuing her from disposal. Though delivered to "Lovesome Downs", she escapes captivity as "The Child of Maka"—a legendary figure from the north. After Lag saves her from Gaichuu territory, she becomes his Dingo. Believed to be seven, she's actually 200 years old, born in Blue Notes Blues. She later discovers she has a twin sister and is truly Maka's offspring.
Gauche Suede (ゴーシュ・スエード, Gōshu Suēdo) / Noir (ノワール, Nowāru)
Voiced by: Jun Fukuyama
Gauche Suede is a Letter Bee who once rescued Lag when he was marked as a letter in Yodaka District, delivering him to his aunt in Campbell. Driven by his desire to become Head Bee and provide for his sister Sylvette, he later reappears as the emotionless Marauder Noir, having lost his memories. As Noir, he ruthlessly steals letters yet remains fiercely protective of Roda. On the Day of Flicker, Gauche lost his mother in childbirth, leaving him devoted to Sylvette's happiness. Lag's attempt to restore his memories with a letter bullet only partially succeeds, transferring Lag's memories of him instead. Gauche's combat abilities include the Kurobari (Black Needle) attack. Once wielding Nocturne #20 as a Letter Bee, he now carries the Gymnopédie, capable of the Raven Black technique.
Sylvette Suede (シルベット・スエード, Shirubetto Suēdo)
Voiced by: Nana Mizuki
Gauche's younger, paraplegic sister, who was born on the Day of Flicker. After he left to go to Akatsuki, he later disappeared and she believed him to be dead, but later learns that he is alive. By the end of the story, the sun takes her heart, but Lag reclaims it.
Roda (ロダ, Roda) (dog)
Gauche's Dingo. She is a dog who specializes in fighting and tracking and is a skilled hunter.
Roda (ロダ, Roda) (human)
Voiced by: Yui Horie
A child who Reverse's leader gave to Gauche as an assistant and whom he subconsciously named after his former Dingo. She was a failed experiment, having been mixed with several species/creatures, but was abandoned after the experiment failed until Lawrence found her.
Steak (ステーキ, Sutēki)
Voiced by: Naomi Nagasawa
Steak's pet, who began accompanying her after she destroyed Love Someone Down's sideshow and has the ability to sniff out a Gaichuu's weak spots. He is implied to be the last of the Kapellmeister, a species that once coexisted with the Spirit Insects and is now thought to be extinct.
Connor Kluff (コナー・クルフ, Konā Kurufu)
Voiced by: Hisayoshi Suganuma
Connor is a veteran Letter Bee who guides Lag to his interview and frequently delivered mail to Campbell during Lag's childhood. He falls for Sunny, a girl from Lamento Town's abbey, unaware she belongs to the rebel group Reverse. When the abbey's residents lose their hearts to the Cabernet Gaichuu, Connor attempts to fight it in despair before collapsing. He stays by Sunny's side as she lies comatose, refusing to give up hope. She eventually recovers when it's discovered part of her heart remained, later becoming his girlfriend. Connor's Spirit Amber technique, "Heart Landmine", involves planting explosive shards of his "Appetite" that detonate on contact.
Largo Lloyd (ラルゴ・ロイド, Rarugo Roido)
Voiced by: Katsuyuki Konishi
The master of the Bee Hive, who later joins Reverse, having been as a test subject by them, and plans to overthrow the government.
Aria Link (アリア・リンク, Aria Rinku)
Voiced by: Ami Koshimizu
The sub master of the Bee Hive, who acts as Largo's right-hand man. Aria's Spirit Amber ability is the Heart Restoration Bullet, which she executes by playing music on her violin. It has a healing effect on those who hear it, which is stronger on those closer to her. Her Spirit Amber attack is "Benihiiro no Senritsu" (Crimson Melody), which is emitted from her violin.
Sabrina Mary (サブリナ・メリー, Saburina Merii)
Lag's aunt, who lives in Campbell Litus and whom Gauche entrusted with Lag's care. She is a good friend of his mother, the current Empress.
Dr. Thunderland Jr.
Voiced by: Hideo Ishikawa
A biologist who works for the Third Bioscience advisory panel of AmberGround division. He specializes in pathology and collects corpses for dissection and study, earning him the nickname "The Corpse Doctor". Despite his job, he has a kind heart, as he makes a star-shaped memorial for each corpse he dissects. Zazie once hated him because he thought he had taken a group of street kittens, but in reality he had quarantined them because of a disease. He is also one of the five survivors of the airship that crashed on the Day of Flicker.
Zazie Winters (ザジ, Zaji)
Voiced by: Daisuke Kishio
A Letter Bee. When he was a child, his parents were killed by a Gaichuu, leading him to become a Letter Bee in order to seek revenge against the Gaichuu, whom he is skilled at killing. Since he has dedicated himself to killing Gaichuu, he does not care for delivering letters. Zazie is fond of cats, which caused him to hate Dr. Thunderland because he thought that he had killed an alley cat he was feeding. However, he forgives him after learning that he had quarantined the cat because of a disease. Zazie is also fond of Jiggy Pepper and looks up to him. Zazie's Spirit Amber attack is Aotoge (Blue Thorn), which uses shards of his "Malice" instead of his heart.
Wasiolka (ヴァシュカ, Vashuka)
Zazie's Dingo, which is a black panther. It has stuck with Zazie since it was a kitten out of fondness towards him.
Jiggy Pepper (ジギー・ペッパー, Jigī Peppā)
Voiced by: Kazuya Nakai
A Letter Bee who is first mentioned by his adopted sister, Nelli, and who Zazie looks up to. He seeks to become stronger for her, and only follows who he wants to follow. Nelli hated him because she blamed the death of her brother Nello on him leaving them. Jiggy later saves Lag from a giant Gaichuu, telling him that had received a letter from Nelli telling him about his efforts, and thanks him before departing. Largo later entrusts him with caring for Zazie, and they leave to pursue the Gaichuu heading towards Akatsuki. His Dingo is a hawk named Harry. His Spirit Amber is Gunjou, Sea Blue Ultramarine, which he executes through a Shindanjuu he carries besides his motorcycle.
Anne Seeing (アン.シーイング, An Shīingu)
Lag's mother, who at the beginning of the story was kidnapped by men from Akatsuki. She is later revealed to be from the royal bloodline and part of the machine keeping the artificial sun lit. During the Day of Flicker, she was struck by a fragment of heart, causing an accelerated pregnancy. After giving birth to Lag, who was a being of pure heart, she had Sabrina place a Spirit Amber in his eye socket to prevent him from fading away, which gave him human form.
Lawrence (ローレンス, Rōrensu)
Reverse's leader, who aims to plunder the letters that Letter Bees deliver. He gave Gauche his new identity as Noir.

== Media ==
=== Manga ===
Written and illustrated by Hiroyuki Asada, Tegami Bachi debuted in Shueisha's Monthly Shōnen Jump on September 6, 2006. The magazine ceased its publication on June 6, 2007. Following a special un-numbered one-shot chapter published in Weekly Shōnen Jump on October 15, 2007, the series was transferred to the then brand new magazine Jump Square on November 2 of the same year, where it ran until its conclusion on November 4, 2015. Shueisha collected its 99 individual chapters in twenty tankōbon volumes, released from January 4, 2007, to January 4, 2016.

Viz Media announced that it had licensed Tegami Bachi for an English-language adaption in North America at San Diego Comic-Con on February 28, 2010. It was announced that Tegami Bachi, otherwise known as Letter Bee in English translations, will be serialized in the monthly manga anthology Shonen Jump, where it replaced the manga series Slam Dunk. It debuted in the March 2009 issue of the magazine.

=== Drama CD ===
A drama CD, which adapted the Jiggy Pepper arc, was released on February 16, 2009.

=== Anime ===
A special anime adaptation, running for about 30 minutes, was shown during the Jump Super Anime Tour events in Japan in the fall of 2008. It was titled Tegami Bachi: Hikari to Ao no Gensō Yawa (テガミバチ 〜光と青の幻想夜話〜, Letter Bee: Light and Blue Night Fantasy), and was animated by Pierrot+. An original video animation was translated for free by Anthony Carl Kimm on the Jumpland website with English subtitles. It was later released on DVD in the beginning of 2009.

In April 2009, it was announced that Tegami Bachi would receive an anime television series adaptation. The series was directed by Akira Iwanaga. The series aired on TV Tokyo, TV Osaka, TV Aichi and other affiliated television networks from October 3, 2009, to March 27, 2010. The first opening theme song is Hajimari no Hi (はじまりの日), performed by Suga Shikao featuring Mummy-D. The second opening theme song is Love Letter no Kawari ni Kono Uta O (ラブレターのかわりにこの詩を。; lit. Rather than a Love Letter, Choose This Poem), performed by Seira. In Southeast Asia, the series aired on Animax Asia under the title Letter Bee.

A second season, Tegami Bachi Reverse, was announced in February 2010. The second season aired from October 3, 2010, to March 26, 2011. The first opening theme song is Chiisana Mahō (小さな魔法, Little Magic), performed by Stereopony, while the first ending theme song is Wasurenagusa (勿忘草, Forget-Me-Not), performed by Piko. The second opening theme song is Yakusoku (約束, Promise), performed by Suga Shikao, while the second ending theme Perseus (ペルセウス, Perseus), performed by Yamazaru.

In North America, both seasons have been licensed by Sentai Filmworks.

== Reception ==
=== Manga ===
In her review of the first volume, Deb Aoki of About.com said that the series "has the right stuff to appeal to both male and female readers: thrilling action, a magical world full of mysteries, likeable characters that are worth caring about, and lovely artwork, all done with a touch of light-hearted humor."

In Japan, volume 2 of the manga debuted sixth during the first week of its release.

=== Anime ===
Carlo Santos of Anime News Network reviewed the first six episodes of the series, praising it as a refreshing adventure series focused on "the triumphs and tragedies of the human heart". He admired its unique atmosphere and art direction, blending feudal and industrial aesthetics, but criticized the Gaichuu's CGI. Despite this, Santos gave the series a B−, offering an overall positive review.
