= KochiKame: Tokyo Beat Cops =

Japanese media franchise

- First tankōbon volume cover, featuring Kankichi Ryotsu

こちら葛飾区亀有公園前派出所 (Kochira Katsushika-ku Kameari Kōen Mae Hashutsujo)
- Genre: Comedy
- Manga
- Written by: Osamu Akimoto
- Published by: Shueisha
- English publisher: Shueisha (digital)
- Imprint: Jump Comics
- Magazine: Weekly Shōnen Jump
- Original run: September 21, 1976 – September 17, 2016
- Volumes: 203
- Anime film
- Directed by: Hiroshi Sasagawa
- Written by: Takao Koyama
- Music by: Tadayoshi Matsui
- Studio: Tatsunoko Production
- Released: November 23, 1985
- Runtime: 30 minutes
- Anime television series
- Directed by: Tetsuo Yasumi; Noboru Misawa; Shinji Takamatsu; Norihiro Takamoto; Akira Shigino
- Music by: Ryo Yonemitsu; Toshihiko Sahashi
- Studio: Studio Gallop
- Licensed by: Remow
- Original network: FNS (Fuji TV)
- Original run: Regular broadcast June 16, 1996 – December 19, 2004; Specials; January 3, 2005 – September 18, 2016
- Episodes: 373 + 27 specials
- Anime film

Kochira Katsushika-ku Kameari Kōen-mae Hashutsujo the Movie
- Directed by: Shinji Takamatsu
- Written by: Toshimichi Okawa
- Music by: Toshihiko Sahashi
- Studio: Studio Gallop
- Released: December 23, 1999
- Runtime: 95 minutes
- Anime film

Kochira Katsushika-ku Kameari Kōen-mae Hashutsujo the Movie 2: UFO Shūrai! Tornado Daisakusen!!
- Directed by: Shinji Takamatsu
- Written by: Shinji Takamatsu; Toshimichi Okawa
- Music by: Toshihiko Sahashi
- Studio: Studio Gallop
- Released: December 20, 2003
- Runtime: 109 minutes
- Anime television series

Shin Kochira Katsushika-ku Kameari Kōen Mae Hashutsujo
- Directed by: Akitaro Daichi
- Written by: Shuichi Kamiyama; Yoshifumi Fukushima
- Music by: Toshihiko Sahashi
- Studio: Gallop
- Original network: Fuji TV
- Original run: 2027 – scheduled
- icon

Kochira Katsushika-ku Kameari Kōen Mae Hashutsujo (こちら葛飾区亀有公園前派出所; lit. 'This Is a Police Box (kōban) in Front of Kameari Park in Katsushika Ward'), often shortened to KochiKame (こち亀) and known in English as KochiKame: Tokyo Beat Cops, is a Japanese manga series written and illustrated by Osamu Akimoto. It takes place in and around a neighborhood police station (kōban) in the downtown part of Tokyo, and revolves around the misadventures of middle-aged cop Kankichi Ryotsu.

It was continuously serialized in Shueisha's shōnen manga magazine Weekly Shōnen Jump for 40 years, from September 1976 to September 2016. Its chapters were collected in 203 tankōbon volumes, making it the manga with the second-highest number of volumes for a single series. (Note: Behind only Golgo 13. The Dokaben franchise also has more volumes, but these are spread amongst multiple different series.) The manga has been adapted into an anime television series, produced by Studio Gallop and broadcast in Japan by Fuji TV, three theatrical animated films (by Tatsunoko and Gallop, respectively), two live-action movies, several stage adaptations, and a live-action television series. A new anime television series adaptation is set to premiere in 2027.

By 2014, the manga had over 157.2 million copies in circulation, making it one of the best-selling manga series in history. Kochikame won the Special Judges Award at the 50th Shogakukan Manga Award in 2005, and the 48th Seiun Award for Best Comic in 2017.

== Plot ==
The KochiKame plot involves Kankichi "Ryo-san" Ryotsu coming up with a money-making scheme by inventing a new gadget or capitalizing on a fad, achieving great success, calling on Keiichi Nakagawa's help as things turn sour, and finally losing it all as the fad runs out of steam or out of control. While the plots are gag-driven, much of the humor comes from the combination of mundane characters with those that are bizarrely out of place; such as Nakagawa who has wealth and Ai Asato who is transgender. What they have in common is everyone's lack of actual police work, most of which is never explained or rationalized in the slightest. (It is explained in Jump that Ryo-san is one of the best officers at catching criminals.) Nakagawa and Reiko Akimoto have special licenses (such as for wearing personal clothes instead of uniforms to work) from police headquarters because of their skills in linguistics.

The plot consistently evolved with the times and most of the main characters do not really age, despite the fact that the series started in the 1970s and is later clearly set in the 2010s. However, some characters do age, like the grandchild of Buchao, who was a baby in the early volumes, but is now close to junior high, which the author has self-mocked in a few "look back" chapters/episodes. KochiKame has a broad audience, ranging from adolescent boys to middle-aged salarymen. Ryo-san's antics appeal to children who can laugh at an old buffoon, and to men fearing that they are becoming old buffoons themselves—and also because it often subtly mocks the latest fads and trends. The stories are generally innocent in content, and what little violence appears is comical, while the occasional risqué subjects are included strictly for laughs rather than to titillate. KochiKame's immense popularity has led to guest appearances in the strip by real-life Japanese celebrities such as Tetsuya Komuro.

For creator Osamu Akimoto, KochiKame is an homage to the working-class people and districts of old Tokyo, and most chapters open with an elaborate full-page illustration of a Shitamachi (downtown) street scene, typically with old wooden buildings and boys playing in the streets.

== Media ==
=== Manga ===
Written and illustrated by Osamu Akimoto, Kochira Katsushika-ku Kameari Kōen Mae Hashutsujo started in Shueisha's shōnen manga anthology Weekly Shōnen Jump on September 21, 1976. Akimoto debuted the series under the pen name of "Tatsuhiko Yamadome", but changed to using his real name in 1978, when it reached its 100th chapter. Periodically the chapters were collected into tankōbon volumes by Shueisha, the first released on July 9, 1977. The series ended on September 17, 2016, in the 42nd issue of the year, in commemoration of KochiKame's 40th anniversary. Its 200th tankōbon volume was published on the same day.

Shueisha reprinted the issue that included the final chapter on December 31, 2016, marking the first time a Weekly Shōnen Jump issue has ever been reprinted. Akimoto published a new chapter of Kochikame in Weekly Shōnen Jump on September 16, 2017. A 201st volume was released on October 4, 2021. A 46-page one-shot chapter was published in Weekly Shōnen Jump on July 10, 2023, and another one on August 5, 2024. Another one-shot chapter, to celebrate the 50th anniversary of the series, was published in Weekly Shōnen Jump on August 3, 2026. A 202nd volume was released on September 4, 2026, followed by a 203rd volume on October 2.

From March 2017 to June 2019, Akimoto serialized a sequel in the seinen manga magazine Ultra Jump. Titled Ii Yu da ne!, it is set in a sentō next to a police station in Shitamachi, Tokyo.

In August 2026, Shueisha launched its global digital manga service Manga Million in English and other languages. The service features over 300 titles and released KochiKame for the first time in English.

=== Anime ===
A 30-minute animated film adaptation of KochiKame produced by Tatsunoko Production which was shown alongside an animated adaptation of Izumi Matsumoto's Kimagure Orange Road at a Shonen Jump Anime Festival hosted by Shueisha in 1985. It was directed by Hiroshi Sasagawa, known for his directorial work on Tatsunoko's other works such as Speed Racer and the Time Bokan franchise. It was issued on home video by Shueisha under the Jump Video imprint as a prize for winners of a contest that took place in several issues of Weekly Shōnen Jump for the magazine's 20th anniversary in 1988.

An anime television adaptation of KochiKame began airing on Fuji Television on June 16, 1996. Produced by Studio Gallop, it ran for eight years and 382 episodes before ending on December 19, 2004. Two animated theatrical films were also produced; Kochira Katsushika-ku Kameari Kōen-mae Hashutsujo the Movie (こちら葛飾区亀有公園前派出所 THE MOVIE) on December 23, 1999, and Kochira Katsushika-ku Kameari Kōen-mae Hashutsujo the Movie 2: UFO Shūrai! Tornado Daisakusen!! (こちら葛飾区亀有公園前派出所 THE MOVIE2 UFO襲来! トルネード大 作戦!!) on December 20, 2003.

On September 18, 2016, an hour-long special by Studio Gallop aired on Fuji TV for the manga's 40th anniversary. Kochira Katsushika-ku Kameari Kōen-mae Hashutsujo The Final: Kankichi Ryotsu's Last Day (こちら葛飾区亀有公園前派出所 THE FINAL 両津勘吉 最後の日) features several voice actors reprising their roles from the previous series, as well as director Akira Shigeno.

A short anime featuring characters from the series was produced to popularize the sport of goalball, ahead of the 2020 Summer Paralympics.

A new anime project for the manga's 50th anniversary, titled Shin Kochira Katsushika-ku Kameari Kōen-mae Hashutsujo (新こちら葛飾区亀有公園前派出所), was announced at the Jump Festa '26 event on December 20, 2025, with Studio Gallop returning to produce the anime. The series will be directed by Akitaro Daichi, with scripts written by Shuichi Kamiyama and Yoshifumi Fukushima, character designs by Kenichi Hara, chief animation direction by Hara and Gil-Bo Noh, and music composed by Toshihiko Sahashi. The series is set to premiere on Fuji TV in 2027.

Remow licensed the original television anime in English and started streaming it on its It's Anime YouTube channel in North America.

=== Live-action ===
KochiKame has had live-action film, TV drama and stage adaptations. The movie was directed by Kazuhiko Yamaguchi, starred Mitsuo Senda as Ryo-san and was released in 1977. A live-action TV series starring Katori Shingo as Ryo-san began airing on TBS on August 1, 2009. A second live-action movie, based on this TV series and titled KochiKame - The Movie: Save The Kachidiki Bridge!, opened in Japan on August 6, 2011. Another play adaptation opened in September 2016 for the series' 40th anniversary and, like the others, it was directed, written by and stars Lasar Ishii as Ryo-san, who is also the voice actor for the character in anime adaptations.

=== Other media ===
As part of its 40th anniversary celebration, the series received a 6-part crossover anthology novel with various characters from other series on September 17, 2016. Titled Vs. Kochira Katsushika-ku Kameari Kōen-mae Hashutsujo: Novelization Anthology (VS.こち亀 こちら葛飾区亀有公園前派出所ノベライズアンソロジー), the other series are Girls und Panzer, Osomatsu-san, Haruchika, Cheer Boys!!, Sorcerous Stabber Orphen and Nazotoki wa Dinner no Ato de.

Ryotsu appears playable in the Weekly Shōnen Jump crossover fighting video games Jump Super Stars, Jump Ultimate Stars and J-Stars Victory VS. Other characters from the series appear in a non-playable capacity. J-Stars Victory VS.'s North American and European release (as J-Stars Victory VS.+) marks the first official release of the series' material in English-speaking territories.

== Real-life KochiKame ==
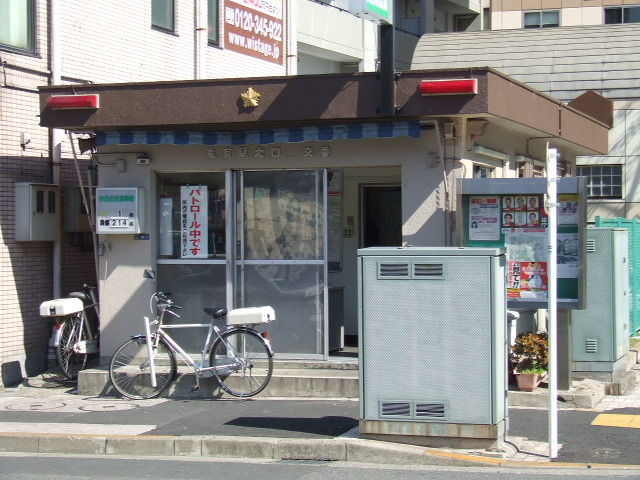
The real neighborhood police station on which the manga one is based

Kameari Koen is an actual park in Tokyo's Katsushika ward. The police station is fictional, but it is modeled after a real one located on the north side of Kameari railway station. The manga has brought considerable fame to the neighborhood, and it draws sightseers from all over Japan. There is only a vacant lot where the police station is actually supposed to be located.

In February 2006, two life-size bronze statues of Ryo-san were erected at the north and south gates of Kameari Station. There is currently a trail of 14 statues in the area.

== 30th anniversary ==
In commemoration of the 30th anniversary of Kochira Katsushika-ku Kameari Kōen Mae Hashutsujo's serialization, several special events were held. Separate one-shots of the series were published in thirteen different Shueisha magazines between August and October 2006.

== Reception ==
By 2014, Kochira Katsushika-ku Kameari Kōen-mae Hashutsujo had sold over 157.2 million tankōbon copies. With 200 volumes, the series held the Guinness World Record for "Most volumes published for a single manga series" from September 2016 to July 2021.

In November 2014, readers of Da Vinci magazine voted Kochikame as the seventh Weekly Shōnen Jump's greatest manga series of all time. Kochikame won the Special Judges Award at the 50th Shogakukan Manga Awards in 2005. Akimoto received the Special Prize at the 21st Tezuka Osamu Cultural Prize for the manga in 2017. Kochikame was awarded the 48th Seiun Award for the Best Comic in 2017. On TV Asahi's Manga Sōsenkyo 2021 poll, in which 150,000 people voted for their top 100 manga series, KochiKame ranked 35th.

In 2005, the anime ranked 36th on its list of the Top 100 Anime conducted by TV Asahi. Mike Toole of Anime News Network included Kochira Katsushika-ku Kameari Kōen-mae Hashutsujo the Movie at number 56 on The Other 100 Best Anime Movies of All Time, a list of "lesser-known, lesser-loved classics." He called it "Kochikame at its best, a zippy combination of daffy comedy and solid action set pieces," with one of the funniest false endings ever.
