= Black Tiger (rapper) =

Swiss rapper

Black Tiger, born Urs Baur, is the first rapper to rap in a Swiss German dialect, namely Basel German. Those now legendary rhymes appeared on the track "Murder by Dialect" (1991), by P-27 featuring Black Tiger. According to author Pascale Hofmeier, this decision to rap in a local dialect, or "Mundart", indicated a major shift in thinking in the Swiss hip-hop scene. His rhymes often reflect pride and investment in his home city of Basel, and in Switzerland as a whole. Later, Black Tiger recorded an album with MC Rony and established the group Skeltigeron with Skelt from P27 and MC Rony. He then focused on his solo career, his solo album "Solo" is seen by some as one of the best rap albums from the German-speaking part of Switzerland.

== Discography ==
- 1999 Groovemaischter 12"
- 2003 Solo
- 2006 Beton Melancholie

=== with MC Rony ===
- 2000 Zwei in aim
- 2007 Tigerony

=== with EKR and Rony ===
- 2004 Deal with the Real EP

--
