= I'll (manga) =

Japanese manga series

- First tankōbon volume cover

アイル (Airu)
- Genre: Drama, sports
- Manga
- Written by: Hiroyuki Asada
- Published by: Shueisha
- Magazine: Monthly Shōnen Jump
- Original run: 1995 – 2004
- Volumes: 14
- Original video animation

I'll/CKBC
- Directed by: Itsuro Kawasaki
- Produced by: Mamiko Namazue
- Written by: Miyuki Takahashi
- Music by: Yoshihiro Ike
- Studio: M.S.C.
- Licensed by: NA: Media Blasters
- Released: December 18, 2002 – March 26, 2003
- Runtime: 30 minutes
- Episodes: 2
- icon

I'll (Japanese: アイル, Hepburn: Airu) is a Japanese sports manga series written and illustrated by Hiroyuki Asada. It was serialized in Shueisha's shōnen manga magazine Monthly Shōnen Jump from 1995 to 2004, with its chapters collected in 14 tankōbon volumes. It follows the life of a team of high school basketball players. It is focused on action scenes which depict the matches played by the team, but also puts emphasis on the interaction of characters outside of the courts. A two-episode original video animation (OVA) adaptation, titled I'll/CKBC (I'll/Crazy Kouzu Basketball Club), was released in 2002 and 2003.

== Plot ==
Akane Tachibana is a freshman high school student who, despite his talent for basketball, decides to abandon sports clubs due to the pressure put on him by them. Once he arrives at Kouzu High, however, he meets the only other basketball player who has ever caught his eye on the courts and decides to join the team. The first match of the season is an exhibition game against the league's strongest team, Hyamazaki—the team that Hiiragi's father coaches and in which his older brother plays for. Hiiragi ends up playing in the second half of the game, and they seem to not be working well together on the court, losing the game, until unintentionally one of the senior players on the team challenges them to beat him. They join forces, inspiring the team to victory. Thus starts the story of a group of teenagers working to reach the top, fighting tooth and nail the entire way.

== Characters ==
=== The team ===
Akane Tachibana (立花茜, Tachibana Akira)
Position: Power Forward. He joins the Kouzu basketball club because he is inspired to play basketball again by his rival, Hiiragi Hitonari, who joined the same school. He drinks flavored milk regularly to try to become taller, but proves he does not particularly need to be with his dunks and dribbling skills. He lives with his mother. He is known for his truthful to a fault speeches and odd catchphrase, uttered at a crucial point during a game in order to pull off a move: "Atchoo".
Hitonari Hiiragi (柊仁成, Hiiragi Hitonari)
Position: Point Guard. He joins the Kouzu basketball club to prove his independence from his domineering father and star player older brother, as well as to meet Tachibana Akane's challenge. He is very serious about his playing, but tends to skip classes in order to sleep on the roof of the school. He lives by himself after his father kicked him out of the house for not going to the school he coached at. He is a 'thoroughbred' player, constantly getting better and extremely dangerous on the courts in every aspect.
Akihiko Harumoto (東本彰彦, Harumoto Akihiko)
Position: Shooting Guard. He joins the Kouzu basketball club with guilty feelings from the injury of his best friend while playing the year before. Tachibana recruits him after finding out the story. His hair is styled into a pompadour and he is known on the courts for his "Supersonic shot", the perfect three-pointer.
Koji Kanemoto (金本浩二, Kanemoto Kōji)
Position: Small Forward. He has been with the Kouzu basketball club for three years and is the sub-captain in the year that Akane and Hiiragi join. He is not an exceptional player, but tries his hardest at everything he does. He used to have a strong relationship with the previous manager of the Kouzu basketball team, who has died.
Yoshiki Yamazaki (山崎義生, Yamazaki Yoshiki)
Position: Center. He has been with the Kouzu basketball club for three years and is the captain of the team. Although he injured his knee the year previously, he desperately wants to make it to the finals this year, his last year. Tachibana inspires and challenges him to rejoin actively the team and get back into playing after an encounter at the store where he works, Red Barns Basketball Supplies. On the courts he has a strong dunk and rebounding skills.
Kyoko Minefuji (峰藤京子, Minefuji Kyōko)
Position: Coach. She joins the Kouzu Basketball Club for a teaching job. She used to be a star player herself, as well as taught the youngest Hiiragi for a year. She takes an active interest in her team and despite her flamboyant style is extremely competitive. "There's no point in starting if you're not going to win!" She is romantically involved with Kondo Yuki.

=== The Fanclub ===
Kondo Yuki
He takes on a teaching job at Kouzu High and finds his old sweetheart, Minefuji, teaching there as well. He is the only one who owns a car and used to be a guitarist in a band called Metro.
Yoshikawa Sumire
She goes to Kouzu High with her childhood friend, Tachibana. She plays basketball, but has little confidence and is not very good.
Asakura Saki
"The Traitor" goes to Kouzu High. He wanted to become a famous guitarist, but after deciding against a contract with a record company in favor of playing with his friends, he discovers that they are only using him for his money and beats them all up. He is known to carry a switchblade.
Horii Mika
She goes to Kouzu with her best friend Yoshikawa. She plays basketball as well, but not as intensely as the boys. She is interested in gossip, and she helps get Kondo and Minefuji back together.

=== Others ===
Takuya Hiiragi
He is the older brother of Hitonari, and son of the coach of Hyamazaki's basketball team. He is a star national player, very competitive and heading for the top. He cares for his younger brother, but pressures him into doing his best, or his father's version of the best. He takes a meeting with Akane Tachibana to heart and believes that perhaps Hitonari will be happy at Kouzu.
Hiiragi Senior
He is the father of Takuya and Hitonari, and someone who is very competitive as a coach and driving his sons to the top, where he never reached himself.
Shibuya Osami
He is a substitute on the Kouzu Team.

== Media ==
=== Manga ===
Written and illustrated by Hiroyuki Asada, I'll was serialized in Shueisha's shōnen manga magazine Monthly Shōnen Jump from 1995 to 2004. Shueisha collected its chapters in 14 tankōbon volumes, released from June 4, 1996, to August 4, 2004. A seven-volume kanzenban edition was released by Shogakukan Creative from December 9, 2022, to January 31, 2024; the last volume includes a special new chapter.

==== Volumes ====
No.	Release date	ISBN
1	June 4, 1996	4-08-872285-X
2	November 1, 1996	4-08-872286-8
3	May 1, 1997	4-08-872287-6
4	November 4, 1997	4-08-872064-4
5	May 1, 1998	4-08-872560-3
6	December 3, 1998	4-08-872646-4
7	July 2, 1999	4-08-872741-X
8	February 2, 2000	4-08-872832-7
9	October 4, 2000	4-08-873030-5
10	July 4, 2001	4-08-873143-3
11	May 1, 2002	4-08-873265-0
12	March 4, 2003	4-08-873387-8
13	December 4, 2003	4-08-873540-4
14	August 4, 2004	4-08-873643-5

=== Original video animation ===
A two-episode original video animation, titled I'll/CKBC (I'll/Crazy Kouzu Basketball Club), was released on December 18, 2002, and March 26, 2003.

In North America, it was licensed by Media Blasters and released on August 17, 2004.
