= Dragon Drive =

2002 manga and anime series

- First tankōbon volume cover

ドラゴンドライブ (Doragon Doraibu)
- Genre: Action, fantasy
- Manga
- Written by: Kenichi Sakura
- Published by: Shueisha
- English publisher: NA: Viz Media
- Magazine: Monthly Shōnen Jump
- Original run: 2001 – 2006
- Volumes: 14
- Anime television series
- Directed by: Toshifumi Kawase
- Produced by: Makiko Iwata; Tatsuji Yamazaki; Satoshi Kubo
- Written by: Toshiki Inoue
- Music by: Shinkichi Mitsumune
- Studio: Madhouse
- Licensed by: NA: Bandai Entertainment
- Original network: TV Tokyo
- Original run: July 4, 2002 – March 27, 2003
- Episodes: 38

Dragon Drive (ドラゴンドライブ, Doragon Doraibu) is a Japanese manga by Kenichi Sakura published by Shueisha and serialized in the manga magazine Monthly Shōnen Jump. Publication ended in 2006, with a total of 14 volumes. Dragon Drive follows lazy junior high school student Reiji Ozora who routinely gives up on everything he starts and is terrible at his school work. Tired of seeing him give up at everything and continue to perform so poorly at school, his childhood friend Maiko Yukino shows Reiji the virtual reality game called Dragon Drive. It is a fighting game in which players and their dragon partners face off within a virtual reality city. Reiji's general lazy personality and lackluster school performances lead him to gain a seemingly equally lazy small dragon whom he calls Chibi. Only later do both of their true strengths show as Chibi, despite being small and sleeping in his first appearance, turns out to be the rarest dragon in the game, a discovery which leads Reiji and his friends to another world called Rikyu.

An anime adaptation by Madhouse directed by Toshifumi Kawase and written by Toshiki Inoue aired on TV Tokyo from July 4, 2002, to March 27, 2003, for a total of 38 episodes. The franchise also spawned three video games, being Dragon Drive: Tactics Break for the PlayStation, Dragon Drive: World D Break for the Game Boy Advance, and Dragon Drive: D-Masters Shot on GameCube.

In North America, Viz Media acquired the rights to distribute the Dragon Drive manga and the anime series was released by Bandai Entertainment.

== Plot ==
Reiji Ozora is a chronic quitter who never completes what's assigned or handed to him, but one day Maiko, his closest friend, walks him to a local arcade where the latest game craze is happening: Dragon Drive. After meeting Chibi, a seemingly meek dragon, Reiji wants to make himself and Chibi stronger. To obtain this strength, both are taken to a secret training room in the "D-Zone", the same room Maiko and Daisuke snuck in earlier upon seeing a strange dragon appearing in the sky. The dragon suddenly absorbs them into another Earth known as Rikyu, where they meet Meguru, a girl who was also transported to Rikyu. There, the elder of the village reveals the intentions RI-ON, the group behind Dragon Drive, have trying to obtain the Jinryuuseki stone, which grants its welder the power to control all dragons in Rikyu.

RI-ON conspires the children to be used as their soldiers. Should they succeed, both Rikyu and Earth will be destroyed. This is where Chibi, who is actually the legendary dragon Senkoukura, the savior of Rikyu, and Reiji become important to both worlds. In order to protect both worlds, Reiji and Chibi must enter the Dragonic Heaven tournament, where RI-ON has already sent for an agent to enter, and win the Jinryuuseki stone. Remembering that Agent L is an employee of RI-ON, the one who helped him through his first few games, Reiji is polarized between both sides, believing the elder and Meguru's testimonies while skeptical of the alleged foul intentions of Agent L or the employees of RI-ON. In the end, he doesn't truly chose either side but instead resolves to fight in order to learn the truth about RI-ON, Rikyu and Dragon Drive.

Several years later progress and Maiko's little brother, Takumi, receives severe warnings to never play Dragon Drive. One day while hiding from a storm, he obtains his first set of cards from a strange old man he meets. After receiving his cards, Takumi finds his new calling by showing strong determination and the mysterious ability to talk to dragons, forming a strong friendship with his strongest dragon Raikoo, as he works to help him gain his memories back.

After a dream one night, Takumi discovers his dragon is one in ninety-nine special dragon cards, all of which are called Raikoo, that were given to certain players of the game called Raikoo masters. Soon a group going by the name of RI-IN enters the scene, and all the players, with the exception of the ones in the gaming stores vanish, leaving the world in ruins and dragons in their place. Left behind in this rapidly changing world, Takumi, Raikoo, and their new friends must rally the remaining Raikoo masters together in hopes of restoring Earth and bringing the people back. In order to save the world, Rikyu and Earth join to become one, and the dragons disappear completely to become spirits. Twenty-seven years later, the game resurfaces to a new audience while Reiji, Takumi, and their friends live out fruitful lives.

== Cast ==
Character	Japanese voice actor	English dubbing actor
Reiji Ozora (大空 レイジ Ōzora Reiji)	Romi Park	Brad Swaile
Chibi (Chibisuke (チビスケ) in Japan)	Chinami Nishimura	Tabitha St. Germain
Maiko Yukino (雪野 麻衣子 Yukino Maiko)	Yūko Sasamoto	Brittney Irvin
Daisuke Hagiwara (萩原 大介 Hagiwara Daisuke)	Michael Shitanda	Sam Vincent
Sun Wols	Yūki Matsuda	Andrew Toth
Hikaru Himuro (氷室ヒカル Himuro Hikaru)	Kenichi Suzumura	Michael Adamthwaite
Kyoji Tachibana (橘 響次 Tachibana Kyōji)	Tomokazu Sugita	Andrew Francis
Sayaka Towa (永遠冴香 Towa Sayaka)	Yukana	Willow Johnson
Ichirō Sumishiba (純柴 一郎 Sumishiba Ichirō)	Issei Miyazaki	Bill Switzer
Meguru (メグル)	Sayaka Ohara	Chiara Zanni
Ensui	Kiri Yoshizawa	Pam Hyatt
Rokkaku	Takehito Koyasu	Lee Tockar
Gokaku	Tomo Saeki	Reece Thompson
Komaki	Hikaru Tokita	N/A
Mahiru	Kenji Nojima	Brian Drummond
Kōhei Toki	Kōhei Kiyasu	Richard Ian Cox
Saizō Toki	Ryūzaburō Ōtomo	Scott McNeil
Agent L	Emi Shinohara	Lisa Ann Beley
Agent G	Jun Fukuyama	Ted Cole
Mukai	Rica Matsumoto	Michael Coleman
Gwonku	Kazuo Oka	N/A
Agent S	Takaya Kuroda	Adam Henderson
Sally	Akemi Okamura	Nicole Leroux
Sue	Miyu Matsuki	Chantal Strand
