= Black Tiger (military unit) =

Kurdish Peshmerga military unit

- Pilingê Reş
- Active: 2014–present
- Allegiance: Kurdistan Region
- Branch: Peshmerga
- Garrison/HQ: Mala Qara, Makhmur district

Commanders
- Notable commanders: Sirwan Barzani; Staff Col. Srud Salih

The Black Tiger (Kurdish: Pilingê Reş) military unit is part of the Peshmerga. It has been variously described as a division, a brigade, and a battalion. It was formed in 2014 under the command of Sirwan Barzani to defend Erbil during the Iraqi Civil War against the Islamic State (ISIS). The unit is headquartered at a former joint Kurdish–French military base in Mala Qara, and is responsible for Sector 6, an area encompassing the nearby Qarachokh Mountains overlooking Makhmur and Gwer in Makhmur District, southwestern Erbil Governorate.

== History ==
=== War against the Islamic State ===
According to Sirwan Barzani, a Peshmerga veteran of the Iraqi–Kurdish conflict and nephew of Masoud Barzani, he formed the unit in 2014 in response to the rapid advance of the Islamic State. He was particularly motivated by the Sinjar massacre and the Islamic State's advance toward the Kurdistan Region's capital, Erbil. The unit was initially formed with 150 fighters, and was reportedly provided with vehicles, food, and weapons from Barzani's personal funds. The unit achieved one of the first Peshmerga victories against ISIS on 10 August 2014 near Makhmur, under the command of Staff Colonel Srud Salih and with support from fighters of the Kurdistan Workers' Party (PKK). During the war, the unit became involved in the liberation of areas in the Makhmur District, including 40 villages and the towns of Makhmur and Gwer.

In 2015 and 2016, Bernard-Henri Lévy visited the unit, which was subsequently featured in his documentaries Peshmerga and The Battle of Mosul.

=== Operations against ISIS sleeper cells ===
Armored vehicles of the Black Tiger unit at one of its bases in 2026.

Following the territorial defeat of the Islamic State in 2017, the unit remained stationed at the village of Mala Qara and atop the nearby Qarachokh Mountains, where it conducted security and counterinsurgency operations against Islamic State sleeper cells across an area of 120 square kilometers. Following the 2017 Iraqi–Kurdish conflict, the areas guarded by the unit experienced a significant security vacuum resulting from the establishment of a buffer zone between Kurdish forces and the Iraqi Army, leading to several confrontations with ISIS cells.

In late 2019, Barzani warned that his unit had observed Islamic State elements in the region "[...] reorganizing themselves, getting weapons and arms." He estimated that approximately 200 Islamic State cells were operating in the eastern Qarachokh Mountains. Barzani reiterated his concerns in the following years and stated that his unit was actively securing the area against Islamic State cells.
