= Kurohime (manga) =

Japanese manga series by Masanori Katakura

- First tankōbon volume cover, featuring the titular character

魔砲使い黒姫 (Mahō Tsukai Kurohime)
- Genre: Romantic comedy; Supernatural
- Manga
- Written by: Masanori Katakura
- Published by: Shueisha
- English publisher: NA: Viz Media
- Imprint: Jump Comics
- Magazine: Monthly Shōnen Jump (2000–2007) (Note: Debuted in the magazine's extra edition in 2000 and moved to the main magazine in 2003.); Jump Square's website (2007–2011)
- Original run: 2000 – 2011
- Volumes: 18
- icon

Kurohime (Japanese: 魔砲使い黒姫, Hepburn: Mahō Tsukai Kurohime; lit. 'Black Princess, the Magic Gunner') is a Japanese manga series written and illustrated by Masanori Katakura. The series debuted in Shueisha's Monthly Shōnen Jump Extra in 2000, before running in the main Monthly Shōnen Jump magazine from 2003 to 2007. It was subsequently moved to the online Jump Square in 2007, where it concluded in 2011. Its chapters were collected in 18 tankōbon volumes. In North America, Viz Media licensed the series for English release in 2007, but ceased publication after 14 volumes.

== Plot ==
Ten years prior to the events of the story, Kurohime ends a major conflict centered on the possession and reconstruction of the Tower of the Gods, a structure that grants divinity to its creator upon completion. After finishing the tower, she destroys it and ascends to the realm of the gods, intent on slaughtering them for instigating the war. Through deceit and overwhelming force, the gods manage to subdue her and divide her essence into two separate entities—one embodying her rage and the other her compassion.

The manifestation of her rage takes the form of a young girl known as Himeko, who seeks to reclaim her original body and power in order to challenge the gods once more. However, the curse binding her can only be broken through love. As Kurohime rediscovers her ability to love through her bond with Zero, she undergoes a series of transformations, each reflecting her evolving nature.

== Characters ==
=== Main characters ===
Kurohime (黒姫)
Kurohime is the world's most powerful witch-gunslinger, possessing abilities such as summoning and controlling dragons. After challenging the gods ten years ago and failing, she was split into two beings as punishment—one embodying her rage and the other her compassion. The rage-driven half takes the form of a child named Himeko, who seeks to restore Kurohime's original appearance and powers, achievable only through the power of love. However, Kurohime's cruel and vain nature complicates this, as she often manipulates the affections of others for her own ends.

Himeko (姫子)
Himeko is Kurohime's childlike manifestation, a diminished form imposed by Shirohime after the gods split her as punishment. Unable to feel love in this state, she can only regain her true power and appearance by experiencing genuine affection. Initially selfish and manipulative, Himeko possesses only a fraction of Kurohime's abilities and treats Zero with disdain. However, as she spends time with him, she gradually rediscovers compassion, allowing her to temporarily revert to Kurohime's form at unpredictable moments. This transformation later becomes permanent during her confrontation with Darkray.
Momohime (桃姫)
Momohime, Kurohime's adolescent form emerges after Shirohime's death breaks the divine curse. Though freed from her punishment, trauma over Zero's loss prevents full recovery of her powers. Yamatohime provides two artifacts: a memory-consuming Lotus enabling temporary transformations, and Yamato-Dachi blade that fuses with Senryu to form a gun/katana hybrid capable of Zero's resurrection. Exiled in a giant peach, she's found by villagers who name her Momohime. This form possesses greater magic than Himeko but remains weaker than her true self, showing increased maturity while retaining her fiery temperament.
Himekojo (姫子嬢)
Himekojo, Kurohime's third form, emerges as a young woman after losing most memories of Zero, retaining nearly full power without sacrificing her final memories. Sent to the past by Kairyu to learn Zero's origins, she adopts a new identity. Discovering Ray is the true "Zero", she purges his darkness by sacrificing herself to the River of Death. Her soul merges with a black tree that Yamato-hime transforms into a white tree of rebirth. Restored, Kurohime defeats Yashahime and gains world-creating powers. Four billion years later, they reincarnate on a new world with reversed genders—Kurohime as a male gunslinger saving Ray's female incarnation.
Shirohime (白姫, Shirohime)
Shirohime represents the benevolent half of Kurohime after their separation by Sword. While Kurohime was exiled to Earth, Shirohime ascended as the Goddess of Benevolence. Unlike Kurohime's younger manifestations, Shirohime maintains constant composure. She ultimately sacrifices herself to protect Kurohime, dying at Darkray's hands.

Zero (零)
Zero, a gunslinger trained by Kurohime after being saved in childhood, wields four revolvers with extraordinary speed while adhering to a strict no-killing philosophy. His unwavering devotion leads to repeated self-sacrifice, culminating in dying to save Kurohime from the River of Death. It is later revealed that "Zero" is actually Ray, his brother, after the original's soul was destroyed during resurrection. The true Zero is resurrected as Dark Zero (堕悪"零, Dāku Zero), becoming the God of Death. He attacks Kurohime but spares one soul petal containing her memories of their love, triggering his full transformation and exposing his suppressed darkness. Dark Zero retreats after Yashahime's injury, then initiates the apocalypse by appealing to Supreme God Igudo. Kurohime's preserved memories become crucial during her time-travel journey to uncover Zero's past.
Ray (レイ, Rei)
Ray is Zero's older twin brother who stopped growing and speaking after witnessing Doc murder their mother. Consumed by vengeance, he follows Doc solely to kill him himself, even protecting Doc from others' attacks. Unlike his brother, Ray displays rude and violent tendencies, insulting Kurohime as a "hag" and physically attacking her when annoyed. His stunted growth and silent demeanor mask his singular focus on personal revenge against their mother's killer.
Zero (ゼロ)
Zero, Ray's younger twin brother, avoided the trauma that stunted his sibling, developing normally and earning the name "Quick Draw Zero" for his gun skills. Unlike Ray, he never witnessed Doc kill their mother. The Vengeance Knights killed Zero after Doc's betrayal. When Ray attempted suicide after his Shinigami awakening, Zero's spirit contacted Himekojo, begging resurrection through forbidden magic to restore Ray. Though Himekojo complied, Sword and her allies subsequently destroyed Zero's soul during the ritual. His sacrifice allowed Ray's return to human form.
Onimaru (鬼丸, Onimaru)
Onimaru, a heavyset gunslinger, bears a tattoo of "dog" and Kurohime's branded name on his back, remnants of his former loyalty. Now seeking revenge after feeling betrayed by her apparent selfishness, he pursues the depowered witch. Despite his vengeful intentions, he remains paradoxically attracted to her. His pursuit represents both his wounded devotion and desire for retribution against his former master.
Tsucchi (ツチノコ, Tsuchinoko)
Tsucchi represents Onimaru's cursed form after partial transformation by Sword of the Death Angels. When forced to kiss her leg, his willpower prevents complete mutation into a man-snake, leaving him a mute lizard while retaining his mind. After learning Kurohime's true motives from Shirohime, he helps lift her curse and joins Himeko's journey. Sword later reverses the curse before the final battle, restoring Onimaru, who then motivates Kurohime by confessing his enduring love.
Yuka (優花, Yūka)
Yuka, a young woman, becomes possessed by the depowered witch Barahime, who uses her body nightly to drain men's life force. By day, Yuka regains control. With Kurohime and Zero's help, Barahime is expelled, leaving Yuka with residual magic. After Zero's death, Sword rescues Barahime from hellfire, enabling her to fully possess Yuka again. They pursue Kurohime through time seeking vengeance, but Kurohime destroys Barahime permanently. Freed again, Yuka becomes Kurohime's loyal follower, grateful for her liberation.
Asura (阿修羅, Ashura)
Asura is a formidable fire-wielding demon whose magical abilities rival divine powers. Initially appearing as a mysterious ally, she aids Kurohime and Zero before suffering grave injuries protecting them from a Mountain God. Her fire-based magic proves most effective in her demonic form, though water remains her weakness. Despite initial reluctance to assist, Asura changes her stance after Zero saves her and witnesses Kurohime's vengeance. This shift leads her to reveal information about her master, who seeks to restore Kurohime's full power. Their alliance culminates in a joint defeat of the Mountain God.
Tokugawa Kazuma (徳河一真, Tokugawa Kazuma)
Tokugawa Kazuma, prince of Big Edo City, is a master swordsman renowned for his lightning-fast strikes. His father bestows upon him a necklace containing three Spirit Kings' power, though using it drains his life force to sustain Yamatohime—visibly aging him and turning his hair white. Kurohime observes his personality mirrors Zero's, and he appears to develop romantic feelings for her. The magical artifact grants immense power at the cost of his vitality, creating physical deterioration with each use.
Yukionna (雪女; 'Snow Woman') and Yukiotoko (雪男; 'Snow Man')
Yukionna and Yukiotoko serve as guardians of Spirit King Byakko. Though childhood friends, their relationship becomes strained when Yukionna begins collecting frozen men, despite Yukiotoko's unrequited love. During their battle with Kurohime, Yukiotoko befriends her while Yukionna realizes her mistakes, leading to their reconciliation. Grateful, they later assist Kurohime's group against the Kurohime Punishment Squad and Yashahime. Yukionna commands ice magic while Yukiotoko transforms into an abominable snowman. Both share a fire weakness that Kurohime exploits. After defeat, they revert to child forms but can temporarily merge into an adult combat form. Their combined power proves crucial in later battles.
Rider (雷堕, Raida)
Rider, nicknamed "Lightning Bolt", is a Wolf Brigade member who fights alongside Zero during Kurohime's time displacement. Initially loyal to Doc through the twins, he defects with the brigade but later kills Doc after Ray departs, becoming a fugitive. A decade later, Kandata (Doc) leads him to Dark Zero for a fractured reunion, now missing his left eye. His signature weapon is an explosive gun hammer resembling Monster Hunter armaments, complemented by exceptional pistol speed. Rider's allegiance shifts throughout the conflict, motivated by debts to both Doc and the twins.
Doc (毒狗, Dokku) / Kandata (犍陀多)
Doc, the ruthless leader of the Wolf Brigade, exploits Ray to control Zero, valuing profit over his men's lives. He sacrifices wounded brigade members during the Lion Castle assault, prompting most survivors to defect after beating him. His theft of military funds later imprisons the group. Ultimately revealed as Kandata, the Styx River ferryman, his obsession with understanding Ray's mercy persists beyond death. This unresolved curiosity prevents him from remaining in Hell like other sinners, forcing him into eternal ferryman duties.

=== Antagonists ===
Darkray (堕悪霊, Dāku Rei)
Darkray, one of the six High Gods and former God of Death, defeated Kurohime during her initial rebellion by using a murdered infant's soul as a shield. He proposed dividing her into two entities—Shirohime (embodying compassion) and the hate-filled Kurohime. Later appearing after Kurohime slays Moai, he commands Shirohime to seal Kurohime's powers, enabling his Death Angels to execute her. This intervention directly continues his role in suppressing Kurohime's defiance against divine authority.
Yashahime (夜叉姫)
Yashahime, Mother Goddess of Earth and Darkray's lover, ranks among the six high gods. She seeks vengeance against Kurohime for Darkray's death, first appearing after Gandhara's demise. While appearing beautiful, she possesses a monstrous treelike form and wields the Hakushinboku (White God Tree)—the divine counterpart to Kurohime's Kokushinboku. Her dual nature shifts violently between calm demeanor and sadistic rage, with even Darkray having feared her instability. This psychological volatility complements her dominion over earth and plants, making her one of the pantheon's most dangerously unpredictable deities.

=== Kurohime Punishment Squad ===
After Kurohime and Zero kill Darkray, the sole surviving Death Angel Sword assembles a team of powerful witch-gunslingers bearing grudges against Kurohime, forming the Kurohime Punishment Squad (黒姫討伐団, Kurohime Tōbatsudan). This specialized unit dedicates itself to hunting down and executing Kurohime as retribution for the fallen God of Death.

Sword (争怒, Sōdo)
Sword (Reikahime) commands the Death Angel Squad (死神天使団, Shinigami Tenshidan), comprising five specialists: Axe (悪子, Akusu), Lance (乱子, Ransu), Mace (冥子, Meisu), Hammer (犯魔, Hanmā), and Dagger (蛇牙, Dagā). Originally dispatched to collect souls revived by Kurohime, she demonstrates particular animosity by transforming Onimaru Gang members into serpentine demons. Later, she resurfaces leading the Kurohime Punishment Squad with enhanced abilities—including blood manipulation and vein-draining techniques—while adopting a more humanoid appearance. Her evolution reflects escalating efforts to eliminate Kurohime through both supernatural means and tactical alliances.
Barahime (薔薇姫)
Barahime, a witch who sustained her youth by draining men's life force, was defeated by Kurohime prior to the series' events. Deprived of her beauty, she partially possessed Yuka, controlling the girl only at night to continue her lethal rejuvenation. After Kurohime severs this connection, Barahime suffers eternal burning until Sword rescues her, recruiting her into the Kurohime Punishment Squad. She later fully possesses Yuka and travels back in time with the squad following their Edo confrontation, continuing her pursuit of vengeance against Kurohime.
Oka (桜花, Ōka)
Oka, a skilled witch-gunslinger in the Kurohime Punishment Squad, shares Kurohime's dragon-summoning abilities while surpassing her in precision sniping. As the sole survivor of a kingdom destroyed during Kurohime's divine rebellion, she sought vengeance at the Tower of the Gods. Though her assassination attempt failed, Kurohime spared her and gifted her a sword-like witch-gun, challenging her to master magic for proper revenge. Unlike her squadmates, Oka avoids collateral damage but employs ruthless tactics against Kurohime specifically. Her backstory creates complex animosity between the two witches.
Aika (愛花)
Aika, a visually impaired magic gun user in the Kurohime Punishment Squad, compensates for her near-blindness with magical sensory abilities. As Saika's devoted lover, she temporarily confiscated his "most sacred" possession after infidelity, yet remains fiercely protective—even risking her life for him. Their complex relationship demonstrates both her strict principles and deep emotional commitment.
Saika (穿花)
Saika, a vain magic gun user, initially pursues Kurohime for her power before joining the Punishment Squad after his lover Aika discovers his infidelity and removes his "most sacred" possession. Despite this, he genuinely loves Aika, vowing to be her eyes when his beauty fades. His alliance with the Materen backfires when their leader betrays him, attempting to transform him into an artificial Death Angel to exterminate humanity. This manipulation reveals the tragic consequences of his relentless pursuit of power.

=== Spirit Kings ===
The four Spirit Kings represent unique spiritual entities possessing individual souls and free will, unlike ordinary demons. As fundamental life forces of the world coveted by the gods, their energy can empower the Yamato Tachi sword into a god-slaying weapon. Three Kings were captured by deities seeking to drain their power, while Seiryu (Wind Spirit King) escaped. Despite resenting humanity for environmental destruction, they ultimately assist Kurohime in forging the Ultimate Sword, recognizing the greater threat posed by the power-hungry gods.

Yamatohime (大和姫)
Yamatohime, the Suzaku (朱雀) and Spirit Queen of Fire, serves as Asura's master. Imprisoned by gods in a volcanic chamber guarded by Gandhara, she gains freedom after Kurohime slays her jailer. Yamatohime provides Kurohime with two artifacts: the sun-forged Yamato-Dachi sword and a memory-laden lotus flower (reduced from 19 to 17 petals). As the planet's living essence, she cannot be forged into the Absolute Sword—necessitating Asura's creation as substitute. When the sword finally completes, Yamatohime exists in a weakened, childlike state with rusted form, her energy nearly depleted from sustaining the world.
Genbu (玄武)
Genbu, the Water Spirit King, grants his captor Saiyuki (ogre goddess) mist transformation, ice creation, and rock-scale armor abilities. Initially content remaining imprisoned due to humanity's environmental destruction, he eventually joins Kurohime after recognizing human potential. His sacrifice empowers Yamato Senryu, transforming it into Genbu Yamato Senryu—a dragon-barreled shotgun. This bestows Kurohime with Saiyuki's defensive capabilities while completing one-fourth of the god-slaying weapon's required spiritual energies. His choice represents the first major Spirit King concession to Kurohime's cause.
Byakko (白虎)
Byakko, the Earth Spirit King, remains imprisoned behind glacial barriers by Yukionna and Yukiootoko. Though willing to oppose divine tyranny, he hesitates to empower memory-depleted Kurohime until witnessing her enduring love for Zero. His eventual sacrifice transforms Yamato Senryu into Byakko Yamato Senryu—a rapid-fire Gatling gun capable of unleashing multiple witch bullets simultaneously. This contribution marks the second spiritual empowerment of the god-slaying weapon while demonstrating Kurohime's preserved humanity through emotional constancy despite her memory loss.
Seiryu (青龍, Seiryū)
Seiryu, the Wind Spirit King, evades capture due to his intangible nature, granting him control over wind and space-time. Disguised as the ocean dragon Kairyu, he aids Kurohime against mermaid hunters and guides her to Zero's past. After witnessing her enduring love for Zero during Yashahime's assault, Seiryu willingly merges with Yamato Senryu, transforming it into a rifle-sized weapon with temporal capabilities. When wielded by Oka, it displaces targets through time—exemplified when Asura is sent moments into the past. His sacrifice completes the god-slaying sword's power.
Kairyu (海竜, Kairyū)
Kairyu, the Sea Dragon, initially appears to grant Himeko's wish of seeing Zero again. However, this is only an illusion, leaving Himeko unsatisfied. Later, the Kurohime Punishment Squad takes control of his body and uses him against Kurohime. He manages to escape in his smaller form and takes Kurohime back to the past to understand Zero better. Upon returning to the present, Kairyu reveals his true identity as Seiryu during the battle against Yashahime.

== Publication ==
Written and illustrated by Masanori Katakura, Kurohime first appeared in Monthly Shōnen Jump Extra in 2000 and ran in the main magazine from 2003 until 2007, when the magazine ceased its publication. The series was transferred to Jump Square's website in 2007 and finished in 2011. Shueisha collected its chapters into eighteen tankōbon volumes, published from February 4, 2002, to April 21, 2011.

In North America, Viz Media announced the acquisition of the series in July 2007. The first volume was released on September 4, 2007. Publication of the series stopped after the release of volume 14 on November 3, 2009.

=== Volumes ===
No.	Original release date	Original ISBN	English release date	English ISBN
1	February 4, 2002	4-08-873228-6	September 4, 2007	1-4215-1366-8
2	October 3, 2003	4-08-873543-9	November 6, 2007	1-4215-1367-6
3	February 4, 2004	4-08-873570-6	January 1, 2008	1-4215-1472-9
4	July 2, 2004	4-08-873636-2	March 4, 2008	1-4215-1570-9
5	November 4, 2004	4-08-873676-1	May 6, 2008	1-4215-1634-9
6	March 4, 2005	4-08-873788-1	July 1, 2008	1-4215-1635-7
7	July 4, 2005	4-08-873836-5	September 2, 2008	1-4215-1636-5
8	December 2, 2005	4-08-873879-9	November 4, 2008	1-4215-1637-3
9	March 3, 2006	4-08-874034-3	January 6, 2009	1-4215-1638-1
10	July 4, 2006	4-08-874134-X	March 3, 2009	1-4215-2419-8
11	November 2, 2006	4-08-874280-X	May 5, 2009	1-4215-2420-1
12	March 2, 2007	978-4-08-874334-9	July 7, 2009	1-4215-2421-X
13	July 4, 2007	978-4-08-874391-2	September 1, 2009	1-4215-2422-8
14	December 4, 2007	978-4-08-874462-9	November 3, 2009	1-4215-2836-3
15	December 4, 2008	978-4-08-874615-9	—	—
16	June 4, 2009	978-4-08-874688-3	—	—
17	April 30, 2010	978-4-08-870069-4	—	—
18	April 21, 2011	978-4-08-870452-4	—	—

== Video game ==
A Japan-exclusive video game based on the series was developed and published by Tomy Corporation for the PlayStation 2 on March 30, 2006.
