= Monthly Shōnen Jump =

Magazine

- Cover of September 2006 issue featuring the manga Kurohime
- Categories: Shōnen manga
- Frequency: Monthly
- First issue: February 6, 1970
- Final issue: June 6, 2007
- Company: Shueisha
- Country: Japan
- Language: Japanese
- Website: Official website archived

Monthly Shōnen Jump (Japanese: 月刊少年ジャンプ, Hepburn: Gekkan Shōnen Janpu; commonly anglicized as MONTHLY JUMP) was a shōnen manga magazine which was published monthly in Japan by Shueisha from 1970 to 2007 under the Jump line of magazines. It was the sister magazine to Weekly Shōnen Jump.

== History ==
First issue of Bessatsu Shōnen Jump

The Monthly Shōnen Jump magazine started as a spin-off issue of Weekly Jump called Bessatsu Shōnen Jump.

The second spin-off issue was called Monthly Shōnen Jump, which caught on and became its own separate independent manga magazine.

Shōnen manga magazines in Japan in the 1980s focused on bishōjo characters, and Monthly Shōnen Jump stood out due to the many product and toy tie-ins it had during that period and into the 1990s. An off-shoot, Hobby's Jump, was published for 16 issues from 1983 to 1988. Another spin-off Go!Go! Jump was a collaboration between its sister magazine Weekly Jump and Monthly Jump; it was published in 2005 and was only published once.

On 22 February 2007, Shueisha announced that Monthly Jump would cease publication as of the July issue (on sale June 6, 2007). Sales had slumped to a third of the magazine's peak, though a new magazine called Jump SQ. took its place on 2 November.

In a letter dated 2 May 2007, Shueisha announced that Claymore would take a month break but it, Gag Manga Biyori, Rosario + Vampire, and Tegami Bachi would be continued in Weekly Shōnen Jump until the start of the magazine Jump SQ.

== List of titles ==
Titles with ☆ were transferred to Shueisha's Jump Square. The magazine's longest running manga were: Kattobi itto (Motoki Monma), Wataru Ga Pyun! (Tsuyoshi Nakaima) and Eleven (Taro Nami, Hiroshi Takahashi)

=== Last series ===
- Rosario + Vampire
- Claymore☆
- Tegami Bachi☆
- Sheisen no Shachi
- Gag Manga Biyori
- Passacaglia Op.7
- Étoile
- Blue Dragon ST
- Buttobi Itto
- Kurohime
- Mr. Perfect
- DohRan
- Surebrec -Nora the 2nd-
- Kuroi Love Letter
- Mizu Cinema

=== Past series ===
- Kia Asamiya
  - Steam Detectives (Moved to Ultra Jump at the magazine's start.)
- Kazunari Kakei
  - Nora: The Last Chronicle of Devildom
- Koji Kousaka
  - Sutobasu Yarō Shō
- Yūichi Agarie & Kenichi Sakura
  - Kotokuri ★
  - Dragon Drive
- Hiroshi Aro
  - Sherriff
  - Futaba-kun Change!
- Rin Hirai
  - Legendz
- Akira Toriyama
  - Neko Majin Z
- Hiroyuki Asada
  - I'll
- Takehiko Inoue
  - Buzzer Beater
- Akio Chiba
  - Captain
- Kōichi Endo
  - Shinigami-kun
- Fumihito Higashitani
  - Kuroi Love Letter ★
- Daisuke Higuchi
  - Go Ahead
- Shotaro Ishinomori
  - Cyborg 009
- Yūko Ishizuka
  - Anoa no Mori ★
- Bibiko Kurowa
- Gentō Club
- Gatarō Man
  - Jigoku Kōshien
- Kōsuke Masuda
  - Gag Manga Biyori ★☆
- Takayuki Mizushina
  - Uwa no Sora Chūihō
- Akira Momozato
  - Guts Ranpei
- Motoki Monma
  - Kattobi Itto
- Go Nagai
  - Kekko Kamen
  - Maboroshi Panty (written by Yasutaka Nagai)
- Keiji Nakazawa
  - I Saw It (published in America by EduComics)
- Tarō Nami & Hiroshi Takahashi
  - Eleven
- Riku Sanjo & Koji Inada
  - Beet the Vandel Buster ★ (Moved to Jump Square Crown)
- Ami Shibata
  - Ayakashi Tenma
- Yoshihiro Takahashi
  - Shiroi Senshi Yamato
- Kikuhide Tani & Yoshihiro Kuroiwa
  - Zenki
- Osamu Tezuka
  - Astro Boy
  - 1985 e no Tabidachi
  - Godfather no Musuko
  - Grotesque e no Shōtai
  - Inai Inai Bā
- Norihiro Yagi
  - Angel Densetsu
  - Claymore ★☆
- Katakura Masanori
  - Kurohime★☆

== Circulation ==
| Year(s) | Monthly circulation | Magazine sales (est.) | Sales revenue (est.) | Issue price |
|---|---|---|---|---|
| 1989 | 1,350,000 | 16,200,000 | ¥2,916,000,000 | ¥180 |
| 1990 to 1991 | 1,400,000 | 33,600,000 | ¥6,048,000,000 | ¥180 |
| 1992 to 1993 | 1,350,000 | 32,400,000 | ¥6,156,000,000 | ¥190 |
| 1994 | 1,300,000 | 15,600,000 | ¥3,276,000,000 | ¥210 |
| 1995 | 1,150,000 | 13,800,000 | ¥2,898,000,000 | ¥210 |
| 1996 | 1,500,000 | 18,000,000 | ¥3,780,000,000 | ¥210 |
| 1997 | 1,000,000 | 12,000,000 | ¥2,520,000,000 | ¥210 |
| 1998 | 800,000 | 9,600,000 | ¥2,016,000,000 | ¥210 |
| 1999 | 730,000 | 8,760,000 | ¥1,839,600,000 | ¥210 |
| 2000 | 650,000 | 7,800,000 | ¥1,638,000,000 | ¥210 |
| 2001 | 620,000 | 7,440,000 | ¥3,704,400,000 | ¥210 |
| 2002 | 1,400,000 | 16,800,000 | ¥3,528,000,000 | ¥210 |
| 2003 | 530,000 | 6,360,000 | ¥1,335,600,000 | ¥210 |
| 2004 | 460,000 | 5,520,000 | ¥1,159,200,000 | ¥210 |
| 2005 | 400,000 | 4,800,000 | ¥1,152,000,000 | ¥240 |
| 2006 | 376,667 | 4,520,004 | ¥1,084,800,960 | ¥240 |
| 2007 | 376,667 | 2,260,002 | ¥542,400,480 | ¥240 |
| 1986 to 2007 | 970,541 | 215,460,006 | ¥45,594,001,440 ($571 million) | ¥212 |
