= List of Maria-sama ga Miteru light novels =

Maria-sama ga Miteru light novel volume 1.

Maria-sama ga Miteru is a light novel series written by Oyuki Konno and illustrated by Reine Hibiki. Shueisha published 37 light novel volumes from April 1998 to April 2012 under their Cobalt imprint. There were also two additional volumes published, the first containing an overview of the series and interviews, and the second featuring an illustration collection. Also listed are short stories published in Shueisha's Cobalt magazine, which were included in later volumes of the novels. Konno also wrote the spin-off light novel series Oshaka-sama mo Miteru, which is also illustrated by Hibiki. Shueisha published 10 volumes of the spin-off from August 2008 to November 2013.

== Maria-sama ga Miteru ==
=== Light novels ===
No.	Title	Japanese release date	Japanese ISBN
01	Maria-sama ga Miteru; The Virgin Mary Watches Over Us (マリア様がみてる)	April 24, 1998	978-4-08-614459-9
02	Maria-sama ga Miteru: Yellow Rose Revolution; Kibara Kakumei (マリア様がみてる 黄薔薇革命)	February 3, 1999	978-4-08-614554-1
03	Maria-sama ga Miteru: Forest of Thorns; Ibara no Mori (マリア様がみてる いばらの森)	April 27, 1999	978-4-08-614591-6
Chapter 1: "Forest of Thorns" (いばらの森, "Ibara no Mori"); Chapter 2: "White Petals" (白き花びら, "Shiroki Hanabira")
04	Maria-sama ga Miteru: Rosa Canina; Rosa Kanīna (マリア様がみてる ロサ・カニーナ)	December 1, 1999	978-4-08-614661-6
Chapter 1: "Rosa Canina" (ロサ・カニーナ, "Rosa Kanīna"); Chapter 2: "During the Long Night" (長き夜の, "Nagaki Yo no")
05	Maria-sama ga Miteru: Valentine's Gift (Part I); Warentīnusu no Okurimono (Zenpen) (マリア様がみてる ウァレンティーヌスの贈り物(前編))	March 3, 2000	978-4-08-614695-1
Chapter 1: "Surprise Chocolate" (びっくりチョコレート, "Bikkuri Chokorēto"); Chapter 2: "Yellow Rose Blend" (黄薔薇交錯, "Kibara Kōsaku")
06	Maria-sama ga Miteru: Valentine's Gift (Part II); Warentīnusu no Okurimono (Kōhen) (マリア様がみてる ウァレンティーヌスの贈り物(後編))	April 25, 2000	978-4-08-614715-6
Chapter 1: "First Date Triangle" (ファースト デート トライアングル, "Fāsuto Dēto Toraianguru"); Chapter 2: "The Red Card" (紅いカード, "Akai Kādo"); Chapter 3: "The Greatest Day of Rosa Chinensis's Life" (紅薔薇さま、人生最良の日, "Rosa Kinenshisu, Jinsei Sairyō no Hi")
07	Maria-sama ga Miteru: The Loving Times (Part I); Itoshiki Toshitsuki (Zenpen) (マリア様がみてる いとしき歳月(としつき)(前編))	February 2, 2001	978-4-08-614817-7
Chapter 1: "Yellow Rose at Full Speed" (黄薔薇まっしぐら, "Kibara Masshigura"); Chapter 2: "Very Busy Days" (いと忙し日々, "Ito Sewashi Hibi"); Chapter 3: "A Short Interlude" (一寸一服, "Chotto Ippuku")
08	Maria-sama ga Miteru: The Loving Times (Part II); Itoshiki Toshitsuki (Kōhen) (マリア様がみてる いとしき歳月(後編))	April 3, 2001	978-4-08-614841-2
Chapter 1: "Will"; Chapter 2: "As the Years Pass By" (いつしか年も, "Itsushika Toshi mo"); Chapter 3: "Hold One of My Hands" (片手だけつないで, "Katate Dake Tsunaide")
09	Maria-sama ga Miteru: Cherry Blossom; Cherī Burossamu (マリア様がみてる チェリーブロッサム)	July 27, 2001	978-4-08-614895-5
Chapter 1: "The Cherry in the Ginkgos" (銀杏の中の桜, "Ichō no Naka no Sakura"); Chapter 2: "BGN (Background Noise)" (BGN (バックグラウンドノイズ), "Bijīenu (Bakku Guraundo Noizu)")
10	Maria-sama ga Miteru: Rainy Blue; Reinī Burū (マリア様がみてる レイニーブルー)	March 29, 2002	978-4-08-600078-9
Chapter 1: "The Drop of a Rosary" (ロザリオの滴, "Rozario no Shizuku"); Chapter 2: "Yellow Rose Warning" (黄色薔薇注意報, "Kibara Chūihō"); Chapter 3: "Rainy Blue" (レイニーブルー, "Reinī Burū")
11	Maria-sama ga Miteru: Holding a Parasol; Parasoru o Sashite (マリア様がみてる パラソルをさして)	July 1, 2002	978-4-08-600136-6
12	Maria-sama ga Miteru: Vacation of the Lambs; Kohitsujitachi no Kyūka (マリア様がみてる 子羊たちの休暇)	December 25, 2002	978-4-08-600210-3
13	Maria-sama ga Miteru: One Page of Midsummer; Manatsu no Ichi Pēji (マリア様がみてる 真夏の一ページ)	March 28, 2003	978-4-08-600243-1
Chapter 1: "Operation OK For Short (Tentative)" (略してOK大作戦(仮), "Ryakushite Ōkē Daisakusen (Kari)"); Chapter 2: "Together With the Old Gentleman" (おじいさんと一緒, "Ojiisan to Issho"); Chapter 3: "Rosa Foetida ☆ Illustrated Diary" (黄薔薇☆絵日記, "Kibara ☆ Enikki")
14	Maria-sama ga Miteru: Cool Breeze; Suzukaze Satsu-satsu (マリア様がみてる 涼風 (すずかぜ) さつさつ)	July 1, 2003	978-4-08-600284-4
15	Maria-sama ga Miteru: Ready, Go! Redī, Gō! (マリア様がみてる レディ、GO!)	October 31, 2003	978-4-08-600337-7
16	Maria-sama ga Miteru: Variety Gifts; Baraetī Gifuto (マリア様がみてる バラエティギフト)	December 25, 2003	978-4-08-600360-5
Intermediate chapters - "Variety Gifts" I, II, III, IV; Chapter 1: "Christmas Miracle" (降誕祭の奇跡, "Kōtansai no Kiseki"); Chapter 2: "Chocolate and Portrait" (ショコラとポートレート, "Shokora to Pōtorēto"); Chapter 3: "The Extra Sheep Passes By" (羊が一匹さく越えて, "Hitsuji ga Ippiki Saku Koete"); Chapter 4: "Poison Apple" (毒入りリンゴ, "Doku-iri Ringo")
17	Maria-sama ga Miteru: Ciao Sorella! Chao Sorerra! (マリア様がみてる チャオ ソレッラ!)	March 31, 2004	978-4-08-600399-5
Chapter 1: "Ciao Sorella" (チャオ ソレッラ!, "Chao Sorerra!"); Chapter 2: "Rosa Chinensis en Bouton's Absence" (紅薔薇のつぼみの不在, "Rosa Kinenshisu no Tsubomi no Fuzai")
18	Maria-sama ga Miteru: Just a Day Which is not Special; Tokubetsu de nai Tada no Ichi-nichi (マリア様がみてる 特別でないただの一日)	October 1, 2004	978-4-08-600484-8
19	Maria-sama ga Miteru: In Library; In Raiburarī (マリア様がみてる インライブラリー)	December 25, 2004	978-4-08-600527-2
Intermediate chapters: "In Library" I, II, III, IV, V, VI; Chapter 1: "Illusion on a Quiet Night" (静かなる夜のまぼろし, "Shizukanaru Yoru no Maboroshi"); Chapter 2: "Joana" (ジョアナ); Chapter 3: "Chocolate Coat" (チョコレートコート, "Chokorēto Kōto"); Chapter 4: "Legend of Cherry Blossom Class" (桜組伝説, "Sakura-gumi Densetsu"); Chapter 5: "Library Book" (図書館の本, "Toshokan no Hon")
20	Maria-sama ga Miteru: Sœur Audition; Sūru Ōdishon (マリア様がみてる 妹オーディション)	April 1, 2005	978-4-08-600568-5
Chapter 1: "OK/NG to hold an audition" (是か非か オーディション, "Ze ka Hi ka Ōdishon"); Chapter 2: "the Star of Mary" (マリア様の星, "Maria-sama no Hoshi"); Chapter 3: "Welcome to the tea party" (ようこそ茶話会へ, "Yōkoso Sawakai he"); Chapter 4: "an Interim Report" (中間報告, "Chūkan Hōkoku"); Chapter 5: "Main Battle" (バトル本番, "Batoru Honban"); Chapter 6: "Harvests" (収穫, "Shūkaku")
21	Maria-sama ga Miteru: Rose Mille-Feuille; Bara no Mirufīyu (マリア様がみてる 薔薇のミルフィーユ)	July 1, 2005	978-4-08-600609-5
Chapter 1: "Yellow Rose Panic" (黄薔薇パニック, "Kibara Panikku"); Chapter 2: "White Rose Reverie" (白薔薇の物思い, "Shirobara no Mono-omoi"); Chapter 3: "Sigh of the Red Rose" (紅薔薇のため息, "Benibara no Tame-iki")
22	Maria-sama ga Miteru: A Blank Map to the Future; Mirai no Hakuchizu (マリア様がみてる 未来の白地図)	December 22, 2005	978-4-08-600704-7
Chapter 1: "Future Blank Map" (未来の白地図, "Mirai no Hakuchizu"); Chapter 2: "Dialogue of the Roses" (薔薇のダイアローグ, "Bara no Daiarōgu")
23	Maria-sama ga Miteru: The Other Side of the Frosted Glass; Kumori Garasu no Mukō-gawa (マリア様がみてる くもりガラスの向こう側)	March 31, 2006	978-4-08-600743-6
24	Maria-sama ga Miteru: Masked Actress; Kamen no Akutoresu (マリア様がみてる 仮面のアクトレス)	June 30, 2006	978-4-08-600784-9
Chapter 1: "Yellow Rose, Hardball Fight" (黄薔薇、真剣勝負, "Kibara, Shinken Shōbu"); Chapter 2: "Masked Actress" (仮面のアクトレス, "Kamen no Akutoresu"); Chapter 3: "Time in Natural Faces" (素顔のひととき, "Sugao no Hitotoki")
25	Maria-sama ga Miteru: Large Door, Small Key; Ōkina Tobira Chiisana Kagi (マリア様がみてる 大きな扉 小さな鍵)	October 3, 2006	978-4-08-600823-5
Chapter 1: "Key Holder" (キーホルダー, "Kī Horudā"); Chapter 2: "Keyhole of the Heart" (ハートの鍵穴, "Hāto no Kagiana")
26	Maria-sama ga Miteru: Crisscross; Kurisukurosu (マリア様がみてる クリスクロス)	December 22, 2006	978-4-08-600859-4
Chapter 1: "Crisscross" (クリスクロス, "Kurisukurosu"); Chapter 2: "Map Stroll" (地図散歩, "Chizu Sanpo")
27	Maria-sama ga Miteru: In Search of You; Anata o Sagashi ni (マリア様がみてる あなたを探しに)	March 30, 2007	978-4-08-600895-2
28	Maria-sama ga Miteru: Frame of Mind; Furēmu Obu Maindo (マリア様がみてる フレームオブマインド)	June 28, 2007	978-4-08-601034-4
29	Maria-sama ga Miteru: Crown of Roses; Bara no Hana Kanmuri (マリア様がみてる 薔薇の花かんむり)	October 2, 2007	978-4-08-601075-7
30	Maria-sama ga Miteru: Sparkle, Sparkle, Twirl; Kira Kira Mawaru (マリア様がみてる キラキラまわる)	December 26, 2007	978-4-08-601110-5
31	Maria-sama ga Miteru: Margaret and Ribbon; Māgaretto ni Ribon (マリア様がみてる マーガレットにリボン)	April 1, 2008	978-4-08-601144-0
32	Maria-sama ga Miteru: Graduation in Fine Scenery; Sotsugyō Mae Shōkei (マリア様がみてる 卒業前小景)	October 1, 2008	978-4-08-601214-0
33	Maria-sama ga Miteru: Hello Goodbye; Harō Gubbai (マリア様がみてる ハローグッバイ)	December 26, 2008	978-4-08-601244-7
34	Maria-sama ga Miteru: Little Horrors; Ritoru Horāzu (マリア様がみてる リトル ホラーズ)	July 1, 2009	978-4-08-601305-5
Chapter 1: "Little Horrors - I" (リトル ホラーズ―I, "Ritoru Horâzu Ichi"); Chapter 2: "Chinami-san and Me" (チナミさんと私, "Chinami san to Watashi"); Chapter 3: "Little Horrors - II" (リトル ホラーズ―II, "Ritoru Horâzu Ni"); Chapter 4: "Picking up a Handkerchief" (ハンカチ拾い, "Hankachi Hiroi"); Chapter 5: "Little Horrors - III" (リトル ホラーズ―III, "Ritoru Horâzu San"); Chapter 6: "An Honest Lie" (ホントの嘘, "Honto no Uso"); Chapter 7: "Little Horrors - IV" (リトル ホラーズ―IV, "Ritoru Horâzu Yon"); Chapter 8: "One Pair" (ワンペア, "Wanpea"); Chapter 9: "Little Horrors - V" (リトル ホラーズ―V, "Ritoru Horâzu Go"); Chapter 10: "Dream of a Butterfly" (胡蝶の夢, "Kochō no Yume"); Chapter 11: "Little Horrors - VI" (リトル ホラーズ―VI, "Ritoru Horâzu Roku"); Chapter 12: "Extra:Little Panic" (おまけ・リトル パニック, "Omake Ritoru Panikku")
35	Maria-sama ga Miteru: My Nest; Watashi no Su (マリア様がみてる 私の巣)	December 25, 2009	978-4-08-601363-5
36	Maria-sama ga Miteru: Step; Suteppu (マリア様がみてる ステップ)	December 28, 2010	978-4-08-601481-6
37	Maria-sama ga Miteru: Farewell Bouquet; Feauweru Būke (マリア様がみてる フェアウェルブーケ)	April 28, 2012	978-4-08-601631-5

=== Additional volumes ===
No.	Title	Japanese release date	Japanese ISBN
1	Maria-sama ga Miteru: Premium Book; Puremiamu Bukku (マリア様がみてる プレミアムブック)	July 27, 2004	978-4-08-600455-8
Chapter 1: "Maria-sama ga Miteru Anime Introduction" (マリア様がみてる アニメ紹介, "Anime Shōkai"); Chapter 2: "Design Notes: Character Introductions & Setting Informations" (デザインノート キャラ紹介&設定資料集, "Dezain Nōto: Kyara Shōkai & Settei Shiryōshū"); Chapter 3: "Best Shots Chosen by Rosa Sœurs" (薔薇姉妹が選ぶベストショット, "Bara Shimai ga Erabu Besuto Shotto"); Chapter 4: "Yamayuri Council Surprise Interview! (Third Year Students)" (山百合会・突撃インタビュー! 三年生編, "Yamayurikai Totsugeki Intabyū! (San-nen-sei-hen)"); Chapter 5: "Yamayuri Council Surprise Interview! (Second Year Students)" (山百合会・突撃インタビュー! 二年生編, "Yamayurikai Totsugeki Intabyū! (Ni-nen-sei-hen)"); Chapter 6: "Yamayuri Council Surprise Interview! (First Year Students)" (山百合会・突撃インタビュー! 一年生編, "Yamayurikai Totsugeki Intabyū! (Ichi-nen-sei-hen)"); Chapter 7: "Maria-sama ga Miteru, the Manga 'Before the Festival'" (マンガ版 マリア様がみてる 祭りの前, "Manga-ban Maria-sama ga Miteru 'Matsuri no Mae'"); Chapter 8: "Reine Hibiki's Surprise Report at the Dubbing" (ひびき玲音のアフレコ突撃レポート, "Hibiki Reine no Afureko Totsugeki Repōto"); Chapter 9: "Maria-sama ga Miteru Answer" (マリア様がみてる Answer)
2	Maria-sama ga Miteru: Illustration Collection; Irasuto Korekushon (マリア様がみてる イラストコレクション)	July 28, 2006	978-4-08-600797-9

=== Short stories ===
These short stories by Oyuki Konno are published in the bimonthly edition of Cobalt, published by Shueisha.

1. "Maria-sama ga Miteru" (マリア様がみてる), February 1997, pp. 303–330
  Illustrated by Yuma Aoi (あおい由麻, Aoi Yuma). Reworked and published as "Cherry Blossom among the Ginkgo Trees" (銀杏の中の桜, Ichō no Naka no Sakura) in volume 9 of the novels, Cherry Blossom.
2. "Maria-sama ga Miteru: Chocolate and Portrait" (マリア様がみてる ショコラとポートレート, Shokora to Pōtorēto), February 2003, pp. 185–199
  Published in volume 16 of the novels, Variety Gifts.
3. "Maria-sama ga Miteru: The Extra Sheep Passes By" (マリア様がみてる 羊が一匹さく越えて, Hitsuji ga Ippiki Saku Koete), April 2003, pp43–58
  Published in volume 16 of the novels, Variety Gifts.
4. "Maria-sama ga Miteru: Christmas Miracle" (マリア様がみてる 降誕祭の奇跡, Kōtansai no Kiseki), December 2003, pp25–41
  Published in volume 16 of the novels, Variety Gifts.
5. "Maria-sama ga Miteru: Chocolate Coat" (マリア様がみてる チョコレートコート, Chokorēto Kōto), February 2004, pp20–34
  Published in volume 19 of the novels, In Library.
6. "Maria-sama ga Miteru: Legend of Cherry Blossom Class" (マリア様がみてる 桜組伝説, Sakura-gumi Densetsu), April 2004, pp17–29
  Published in volume 19 of the novels, In Library.
7. "Maria-sama ga Miteru: Library Book" (マリア様がみてる 図書館の本, Toshokan no Hon), August 2004, pp21–29
  Published in volume 19 of the novels, In Library.
8. "Maria-sama ga Miteru: Illusion on a Quiet Night" (マリア様がみてる 静かなる夜のまぼろし, Shizukanaru Yoru no Maboroshi), December 2004, pp. 17–25
  Published in volume 19 of the novels, In Library.
9. "Maria-sama ga Miteru: Homely Princess" (マリア様がみてる 不器用姫, Bukiyō Hime), April 2005, pp. 45–53
  Published in volume 30 of the novels, Frame of Mind.
10. "Maria-sama ga Miteru: Greenhouse Fairy" (マリア様がみてる 温室の妖精, Onshitsu no Yōsei), August 2005, pp. 46–54
  Published in volume 30 of the novels, Frame of Mind.
11. "Maria-sama ga Miteru: Clover of Honeywort" (マリア様がみてる 三つ葉のクローバー, Mitsuba no Kurōbā), February 2006, pp. 17–25
  Published in volume 30 of the novels, Frame of Mind.
12. "Maria-sama ga Miteru: Golden Thread" (マリア様がみてる 黄色い糸, Kiiroi Ito), April 2006, pp. 44–52
  Published in volume 30 of the novels, Frame of Mind.
13. "Maria-sama ga Miteru: Doppelganger Stair" (マリア様がみてる ドッペルかいだん, Dopperu Kaidan), August 2006, pp. 19–27
  Published in volume 30 of the novels, Frame of Mind.
14. "Maria-sama ga Miteru: Dead Tree and Budding Tree" (マリア様がみてる 枯れ木に芽吹き, Kareki ni Mebuki), December 2006, pp. 17–25
  Published in volume 30 of the novels, Frame of Mind.
15. "Maria-sama ga Miteru: April Deja Vu" (マリア様がみてる 四月のデジャブ, Shigatsu no Dejabu), April 2007, pp. 17–25
  Published in volume 30 of the novels, Frame of Mind.
16. "Maria-sama ga Miteru: My Nest" (マリア様がみてる 私の巣, Watashi no Su), August 2007, pp. 17–25
  Published in volume 37 of the novels, My Nest.
17. "Maria-sama ga Miteru: One Pair (Part I)" (マリア様がみてる ワンペア(前編), Wan Pea (Zenpen)), February 2008, pp. 185–193
18. "Maria-sama ga Miteru: One Pair (Part II)" (マリア様がみてる ワンペア(後編), Wan Pea (Kōhen)), April 2008, pp. 17–25
  Parts I and II published as a single story in volume 36 of the novels, Little Horrors.
19. "Maria-sama ga Miteru: Chinami and Me" (マリア様がみてる チナミさんと私, Chinami-san to Watashi), September 2008, pp. 19–30
  Published in volume 36 of the novels, Little Horrors.
20. "Maria-sama ga Miteru: Dream of a Butterfly" (マリア様がみてる 胡蝶の夢, Kochō no Yume), January 2009, pp. 30–42
  Published in volume 36 of the novels, Little Horrors.
21. "Maria-sama ga Miteru: Picking up a Handkerchief" (マリア様がみてる ハンカチ拾い, Hankachi Hiroi), May 2009, pp. 17–28
  Published in volume 36 of the novels, Little Horrors.
22. "Maria-sama ga Miteru: Yesterday's Enemy" (マリア様がみてる 昨日の敵, Kinō no Teki), September 2009, pp. 153–165
  Published in volume 39 of the novels, Farewell Bouquet.
23. "Maria-sama ga Miteru: Step" (マリア様がみてる ステップ, Suteppu), July 2010, pp. 17–29
  Published in volume 38 of the novels, Step.
24. "Maria-sama ga Miteru: Until Graduation" (マリア様がみてる 卒業式まで, Sotsugyōshiki made), November 2010, pp. 17–30
  Published in volume 39 of the novels, Farewell Bouquet.
25. "Maria-sama ga Miteru: Private Teacher" (マリア様がみてる プライベートTeacher, Puraibēto Teacher), May 2011, pp. 17–28
  Published in volume 39 of the novels, Farewell Bouquet.
26. "Maria-sama ga Miteru: Candy and Stretch" (マリア様がみてる 飴とストレッチ, Ame to Sutorecchi), November 2011, pp. 9–21
  Published in volume 39 of the novels, Farewell Bouquet.
27. "Maria-sama ga Miteru: Breast Cookie" (マリア様がみてる おっぱいクッキー, Oppai Kukkī), March 2012, pp. 9–21
  Published in volume 39 of the novels, Farewell Bouquet.

== Oshaka-sama mo Miteru ==
Konno and Hibiki have also collaborated on the Oshaka-sama mo Miteru (お釈迦様もみてる, Buddha Watches Too) series of light novels. These books feature the same characters but focus on Yumi's younger brother Yūki and his schoolmates at Hanadera.

=== Light novels ===
No.	Title	Japanese release date	Japanese ISBN
1	Oshaka-sama mo Miteru: Crimson or White; Aka ka Shiro ka (お釈迦様もみてる 紅か白か)	August 1, 2008	978-4-08-601192-1
2	Oshaka-sama mo Miteru: School Toys; Gakuin no Omocha (お釈迦様もみてる 学院のおもちゃ)	April 1, 2009	978-4-08-601274-4
3	Oshaka-sama mo Miteru: Wet or Dry; Wetto or Dorai (お釈迦様もみてる ウェットorドライ)	October 2, 2009	978-4-08-601335-2
4	Oshaka-sama mo Miteru: Self Cheering Squad; Jibun Ōendan (お釈迦様もみてる 自分応援団)	April 1, 2010	978-4-08-601392-5
5	Oshaka-sama mo Miteru: School Festivals; Sukūru Fesutibaruzu (お釈迦様もみてる スクール フェスティバルズ)	July 1, 2010	978-4-08-601422-9
6	Oshaka-sama mo Miteru: S-kinship; S-kinshippu (お釈迦様もみてる S－キンシップ)	October 1, 2010	978-4-08-601451-9
7	Oshaka-sama mo Miteru: Very Difficult Workbook; Chōnankai Mondaishū (お釈迦様もみてる 超難解問題集)	December 1, 2011	978-4-08-601585-1
8	Oshaka-sama mo Miteru: Gracious Vote; Isagiyoki Ippyō (お釈迦様もみてる 潔き一票)	November 30, 2012	978-4-08-601684-1
9	Oshaka-sama mo Miteru: On Your Marks; On Yua Mākusu (お釈迦様もみてる オン ユア マークス)	August 1, 2013	978-4-08-601743-5
10	Oshaka-sama mo Miteru: Firefly Lights; Hotaru no Hikaru (お釈迦様もみてる 蛍のヒカル)	November 30, 2013	978-4-08-601768-8

=== Short stories ===
1. "Oshaka-sama mo Miteru" (お釈迦様もみてる), Bessatsu Cobalt special issue June 2008, pp. 19–70
  Published in volume 1 of the novels, Crimson or White.
2. "Oshaka-sama mo Miteru: The Day I Became Andre" (お釈迦様もみてる アンドレになった日, Andore ni Natta Hi), January 2010, pp. 17–31
  Published in volume 6 of the novels, S-kinship.
