= List of Maria-sama ga Miteru episodes =

Maria-sama ga Miteru (2004) DVD volume 1 cover

Maria-sama ga Miteru is an anime television series adapted from the light novel series of the same title by Oyuki Konno and Reine Hibiki. It was broadcast in Japan between January 7 and March 31, 2004, on TV Tokyo. Produced by Studio Deen and directed by Yukihiro Matsushita, the screenplay was written by Reiko Yoshida, and Akira Matsushima based the character design used in the anime on Reine Hibiki's original designs. The art director for the series is Nobuto Sakamoto. The sound director is Yoshikazu Iwanami, and the soundtrack is composed by Mikiya Katakura. The series was later released by Geneon to seven VHS and DVD compilation volumes from April to October 2004. The story follows the lives of a group of teenage girls attending Lillian Catholic school for girls in Tokyo, Japan. A common theme throughout the series revolves around the lives and close relationships of the school's student council known as the Yamayuri Council. These relationships give off a subtle yuri feel which is revealed through the series' character-driven plotline. The first season covered the story from the original light novels up to the sixth volume.

Most of the production staff would return to produce two additional television series and an original video animation (OVA) series. The 13-episode second season, titled Maria-sama ga Miteru: Printemps (マリア様がみてる〜春〜, Maria-sama ga Miteru ~Haru~), aired between July 4 and September 26, 2004, on TV Tokyo. The series was later released by Geneon to six VHS and DVD compilation volumes from October 2004 to April 2005. It covered the story from the original light novels up to the eleventh volume. The third season, a five-episode OVA series titled Maria-sama ga Miteru, was released on DVD from November 29, 2006, to July 25, 2007; each episode is approximately 50 minutes long. It covered the story from the original light novels up to the seventeenth volume. The 13-episode fourth season, again titled Maria-sama ga Miteru, aired between January 3 and March 28, 2009, on AT-X. The series was released by Geneon to six DVD compilation volumes from March to August 2009. The fourth season is directed by Toshiyuki Katō and the art director is Kazuhiro Itō.

Nozomi Entertainment, the licensing branch of Right Stuf Inc., licensed the three television series and the OVA series under the title Maria Watches Over Us for North American distribution. The four series were released as DVD box sets with English subtitles as follows: July 29, 2008, for season one, November 25, 2008, for season two, March 24, 2009, for season three, and July 6, 2010, for season four. Maiden Japan licensed the three television series and the OVA series after Nozomi Entertainment's license to the franchise had expired.

A set of 29 omake episodes, titled Maria-sama ni wa Naisho (マリア様にはないしょ), were released with the DVDs for each of the four seasons. These one- to two-minute long sequences are parodies, featuring super deformed characters performing fake 'outtakes' from the 'filming' of Maria-sama ga Miteru, including the special participation of Yukihiro Matsushita as the voice of the director.

== Series overview ==
Season	Episodes	Originally aired	
Season	Episodes	First aired	Last aired
Maria-sama ga Miteru
Season 1	13	January 7, 2004	March 31, 2004
Season 2	13	July 4, 2004	September 26, 2004
Season 3	5	November 29, 2006	July 25, 2007
Season 4	13	January 3, 2009	March 28, 2009
Maria-sama ni wa Naisho
Season 1	7	April 2, 2004	October 8, 2004
Season 2	6	October 22, 2004	April 1, 2005
Season 3	5	November 29, 2006	July 25, 2007
Season 4	11	March 25, 2009	August 21, 2009

== Maria-sama ga Miteru (2004) ==
No.	Title	French title	Original release date
1	"The Troubling Soeur Declaration"; Transliteration: "Haran no Shimai Sengen" (Japanese: 波乱の姉妹宣言)	La déclaration troublante	January 7, 2004
Yumi Fukazawa's tie is fixed by Sachiko Ogasawara, her idol and the school's star, setting off a chain of events which would throw the shy and ordinary girl into the world of the prestigious student council. After Yumi walks in on Sachiko arguing with the Yamayuri Council over the school play they will be performing, Sachiko suddenly asks Yumi to be her petite soeur in an attempt to force her way out of the lead role.
2	"The Awkward Piano Duet"; Transliteration: "Munasawagi no Rendan" (Japanese: 胸騒ぎの連弾)	Un duo Inattendu	January 14, 2004
Yumi is hounded by the school newspaper for a report on why she turned down Sachiko and endures dance lessons with the Yamayuri Council and a piano duet with Sachiko. Through various people, Yumi learns more about Sachiko and Suguru Kashiwagi, the one who will be playing the Prince in the Cinderella play.
3	"The Moon and the Rosary"; Transliteration: "Tsuki to Rozario" (Japanese: 月とロザリオ)	La lune et le chapelet	January 21, 2004
Yumi finally meets Kashiwagi when he comes to Lillian for the dress rehearsal, and learns a shocking secret about his relationship with Sachiko. Sachiko's true reason for her refusal to play the lead role is understood, making the bond between her and Yumi truly genuine.
4	"Yellow Rose Revolution"; Transliteration: "Kibara Kakumei" (Japanese: 黄薔薇革命)	La révolution des Roses Jaunes	January 28, 2004
The rest of the Yamayuri Council find out that Yumi finally accepted Sachiko's rosary. Meanwhile, Shimazu Yoshino and Hasekura Rei are voted the school's best sœurs due to their respective girly and bishōnen appearances, but Yumi talks to Yoshino and finds out that there's more to the pair than meets the eye and that the relationship between the two is far from perfect.
5	"Fighting Maidens"; Transliteration: "Tatakau Otome-tachi" (Japanese: 戦う乙女たち)	Les jeunes filles combattantes	February 4, 2004
While Rei is reeling over Yoshino's shocking announcement, a number of Lillian's students break off their soeur relationships in a copycat fashion. Tori Eriko, Rei's soeur, isn't even aware of the problem due to her odd behavior and suspicious absence from school. Yumi goes to the hospital to talk with Yoshino, and learns the true nature of the Yellow Rose soeurs. Yoshino tells her all about her plan to make Rei a stronger person.
6	"Rosa Canina"; Transliteration: "Rosa Kanīna" (Japanese: ロサ·カニーナ)	Rosa Canina	February 11, 2004
A second-year student calling herself Rosa Canina runs against the en boutons in the Yamayuri Council elections with murky intentions. Todo Shimako hesitates to run at all due to her first-year status and her reluctance over taking a leading council position until a talk with Rosa Canina forces her to make a decision. Yumi confronts Sato Sei, Shimako's soeur, over her refusal to encourage Shimako to run, and learns more about the relationships between older and younger soeurs and how to best support Sachiko.
7	"The Surprising Chocolates Part I"; Transliteration: "Bikkuri Chokorēto (Zenpen)" (Japanese: びっくりチョコレート·前編)	Chocolat Etonnant (1ère partie)	February 18, 2004
For Valentine's Day, the Lillian Newspaper Club organizes a treasure hunt in which the winners would get half-day dates with the en boutons. Yumi agonizes over what to get Sachiko for Valentine's Day, resulting in a spectacular misunderstanding between the two of them.
8	"The Surprising Chocolates Part II"; Transliteration: "Bikkuri Chokorēto (Kōhen)" (Japanese: びっくりチョコレート·後編)	Chocolat Etonnant (2 me partie)	February 25, 2004
After a crying Yumi runs away from Sachiko's confrontation, Sei reveals the secret reason behind Sachiko's distress. The treasure hunt takes place with surprising results, and Yumi makes up with Sachiko in her own unique way.
9	"Red Card"; Transliteration: "Akai Kādo" (Japanese: 紅いカード)	La carte Rouge	March 3, 2004
Uzawa Mifuyu narrates her past as Sachiko's desperate admirer and her reasoning behind her decision to not claim the treasure hunt's prize. She finally acknowledges that Yumi is a better match for Sachiko than her, and quietly slips out of their lives and the series.
10	"Forest of Thorns"; Transliteration: "Ibara no Mori" (Japanese: いばらの森)	Le bouquet de roses épineux	March 10, 2004
A tragic lesbian romance novel causes a scandal at Lillian because the author is rumored to be Sei. This prompts Sei to tell Yumi and Yoshino about her past with a girl named Kubo Shiori.
11	"White Petals"; Transliteration: "Shiroki Hanabira" (Japanese: 白き花びら)	Les Roses Blanches	March 17, 2004
A flashback from a year ago tells the story of an angry, silently-suffering Sei, who is saved from her alienation by a girl called Kubo Shiori. The two of them begin a passionate, all-consuming romance, but Shiori's secret plans for the future shatter Sei's heart.
12	"First Date Triangle"; Transliteration: "Fāsuto Dēto Toraianguru" (Japanese: ファーストデート トライアングル)	Le premier rendez-vous à trois	March 24, 2004
The day of the Boutons' dates arrive, and each pair has their problems. Yumi worries over where to take someone of Sachiko's stature, Yoshino follows Rei's date around in her possessive jealousy, and Shimako braces herself for spending a day with her rival, Rosa Canina. Meanwhile, Tsukiyama Minako, the head of the Newspaper Club, and Takeshima Tsutako, the school's ace photographer, try their best to get the scoop on the dates, but they comically fail to track any of them.
13	"Good Day, My Sœur"; Transliteration: "Gokigen'yō, Onē-sama" (Japanese: ごきげんよう、お姉さま)	Bonjour, ma sœur	March 31, 2004
Tsutako and Minako's paparazzi-like plans wear them out while Shimako comes to an understanding with both Sei and Rosa Canina. The dates ultimately strengthen Yumi and Yoshino's relationship with their soeurs and reaffirm the place they stand in their older sister's lives.

=== Maria-sama ni wa Naisho (2004) ===
No.	Title	Original release date
1	"Meeting"; Transliteration: "Deai" (Japanese: 出会い)	April 2, 2004
1	"Shimako's "Wait""; Transliteration: "Shimako no Omachinasai" (Japanese: 志摩子のおまちなさい)	April 2, 2004
1	"The Roses at Teatime"; Transliteration: "Tītaimu no Bara-samatachi" (Japanese: ティータイムのバラ様たち)	April 2, 2004
2	"Displeased Sachiko"; Transliteration: "Iyagaru Sachiko" (Japanese: いやがる祥子)	May 13, 2004
2	"Displeased Sachiko (second time)" Transliteration: "Iyagaru Sachiko (nidaime)" (Japanese: いやがる祥子(2回目))	May 13, 2004
2	"Sorrowful Sachiko"; Transliteration: "Kanashimi no Sachiko" (Japanese: 悲しみの祥子)	May 13, 2004
2	"Yumi Accepts the Rosary"; Transliteration: "Yumi, Rozario Haiju" (Japanese: 祐巳、ロザリオ拝受)	May 13, 2004
3	"Echoing Stomach Bug"; Transliteration: "Narihibiku Onaka no Mushi" (Japanese: 鳴りひびくお腹の虫)	June 4, 2004
3	"Yoshino Gives Back the Rosary"; Transliteration: "Yoshino, Rozario Kaesu" (Japanese: 由乃、ロザリオ返す)	June 4, 2004
3	"Yoshino and Rei Make Up"; Transliteration: "Yoshino to Rei no Nakanaori" (Japanese: 由乃と令の仲直り)	June 4, 2004
4	"Hostile Yoshino"; Transliteration: "Hantai Suru Yoshino" (Japanese: 反対する由乃)	July 9, 2004
4	"Tearful Yumi"; Transliteration: "Namida no Yumi" (Japanese: 涙の祐巳)	July 9, 2004
4	"Yōko's Proposal"; Transliteration: "Yōko no Teian" (Japanese: 蓉子の提案)	July 9, 2004
5	"Uneasy Shimako"; Transliteration: "Fuan na Shimako" (Japanese: 不安な志摩子)	August 6, 2004
5	"Sachiko Eating Chocolate"; Transliteration: "Choko o Taberu Sachiko" (Japanese: チョコを食べる祥子)	August 6, 2004
5	"Yoshino's Anger"; Transliteration: "Yoshino no Ikari" (Japanese: 由乃の怒り)	August 6, 2004
6	"Yumi's and Yoshino's Telephone Talk"; Transliteration: "Yumi to Yoshino no Terefon Tōku" (Japanese: 祐巳と由乃のテレフォントーク)	September 10, 2004
7	"Sachiko's "Delicious♡""; Transliteration: "Sachiko no Oishii wa♡" (Japanese: 祥子のおいしいわ♡)	October 8, 2004
7	"Yumi's Phone Hesitation"; Transliteration: "Denwa o Tamerau Yumi" (Japanese: 電話をためらう祐巳)	October 8, 2004
7	"See You Tomorrow..."; Transliteration: "Mata Ashita..." (Japanese: また明日...)	October 8, 2004

== Maria-sama ga Miteru: Printemps (2004) ==
No.	Title	French title	Original release date
1	"During the Long Night"; Transliteration: "Nagaki Yo no" (Japanese: 長き夜の)	Au Cours d'une Longue Nuit	July 4, 2004
Sei takes Yumi to visit Sachiko's house on New Year's Day where the Yamayuri Council have a party. All the major characters are reintroduced, and with the start of the New Year, Yumi looks happily forward to spring.
2	"Yellow Rose at Full Speed!"; Transliteration: "Kibara Masshigura" (Japanese: 黄薔薇まっしぐら)	La Rose Jaune Advance en Poussant	July 11, 2004
A bunch of photographs implicate Eriko in enjo kosai, or prostitution, while Eriko's behavior becomes even more erratic and strange than usual. As it turns out, Eriko does have a secret, but it is far from what she has been accused of.
3	"Extremely Busy Days"; Transliteration: "Ito Sewashi Hibi" (Japanese: いと忙し日日)	Les Jours Tres Occupés	July 18, 2004
In their midst of their graduation preparations for the third-years, the en boutons forget to organize a farewell party for the Rosas. To make it worse, Yumi finds out at the last moment that the en bouton petite soeurs must also put on a performance, and collapses from the pressure of all her various duties.
4	"Will"; Transliteration: "Wiru" (Japanese: Will)	Le Testtarment	July 25, 2004
In the days before graduation, Rosa Chinesis and Rosa Foetida leave their parting words to their petite soeurs and grande-soeurs. Yumi begins to worry why Rosa Gigantea hasn't done the same. She swears to Sei she'd look after Shimako and promises to do anything as her final request, and Sei's answer leads to a surprisingly sweet moment and a revelation about her future.
5	"The Years that have Passed by" Transliteration: "Itsushika Toshi mo" (Japanese: いつしか年も)	Le temps sést passe	August 1, 2004
Graduation day arrives. As the rest of the Yamayuri Council struggle with conflicting emotions, the Rosas reflect on their lives and the memories which shaped them.
6	"Hold But One Hand of Mine"; Transliteration: "Katate Dake Tsunaide" (Japanese: 片手だけつないで)	La Main dans la Main	August 8, 2004
With graduation's onset, Sei and Shimako remember the events which led them to become soeurs in spite of their many complex obstacles and reservations. The two of them ultimately form a deep and healthy relationship without becoming codependent.
7	"Cherry Blossom"; Transliteration: "Cherī Burossamu" (Japanese: チェリーブロッサム)	Les fleurs de cerises	August 15, 2004
Shimako falls into a depression after Sei graduates and cannot bear the weight of her secret alone. But a chance meeting with the down-to-earth Nijo Noriko gives her a new friend.
8	"The Cherry in the Ginkgos"; Transliteration: "Ichō no Naka no Sakura" (Japanese: 銀杏の中の桜)	Un cerisier parmi des icho	August 22, 2004
Shimako and Noriko become even closer, but a shocking revelation about Shimako's true religion is announced in front of the entire school, testing their relationship. Meanwhile, the Yamayuri Council is concerned over the state of Shimako's well-being and decide to take matters into their own hands.
9	"The Drop of Rosary"; Transliteration: "Rozario no Shizuku" (Japanese: ロザリオの滴)	Des Lrames du chapelet	August 29, 2004
Shimako is pressured to take Noriko as her petite soeur, but is hesitant due to the differences between Noriko and the general culture of Lillian. Caught between her loyalty to the Yamayuri Council and her desire to protect Noriko, Shimako quietly suffers until an argument forces Noriko into action.
10	"Yellow Rose Warning"; Transliteration: "Kibara Chūihō" (Japanese: 黄薔薇注意報)	Prenez garde des roses jaunes	September 5, 2004
Yoshino takes advantage of her newfound health by joining Rei's kendo club, causing extreme worry on Rei's part and another roadblock in their relationship.
11	"Rainy Blue"; Transliteration: "Reinī Burū" (Japanese: レイニーブルー)	Un bleu pleuvieux	September 12, 2004
Yumi and Sachiko have not been spending much time with each other, for Sachiko is always with Tōko. Every time Sachiko and Yumi are alone together, Tōko appears. Yumi begins to believe that Sachiko prefers Tōko over her.
12	"The Blue Umbrella"; Transliteration: "Aoi Kasa" (Japanese: 青い傘)	Le parapluie blue	September 19, 2004
Yumi gets back onto her feet with different people helping her out. She understands that she must develop an identity outside of being Sachiko's petite soeur.
13	"Holding a Parasol"; Transliteration: "Parasoru o Sashite" (Japanese: パラソルをさして)	Avec un parasol	September 26, 2004
Yumi is collected by Suguru and Yoko to go to Sachiko. Sachiko has been coping with the terminal illness of her grandmother, and did not want to burden Yumi with this, but is surprised to learn that she hurt Yumi through her distance. They resolve to rely on each other more.

=== Maria-sama ni wa Naisho (2004-2005) ===
No.	Title	Original release date
1	"New Year's! Meeting Up After a While"; Transliteration: "Oshōgatsu! Hisabisa no Shūgō" (Japanese: お正月! 久々の集合)	October 22, 2004
1	"Long Night"; Transliteration: "Nakaki yo" (Japanese: 〜なかきよ〜)	October 22, 2004
1	"Love ♡ Mountain"; Transliteration: "Love♡Yamabe" (Japanese: LOVE♡山辺)	October 22, 2004
2	"Magician Yoshino"; Transliteration: "Majishan Yoshino" (Japanese: マジシャン由乃)	November 25, 2004
2	"Oh, Heave-ho"; Transliteration: "Ara Essassā" (Japanese: アラエッサッサー)	November 25, 2004
2	"Hot Milk"; Transliteration: "Hotto Miruku Gyūnyū" (Japanese: ホットミルク牛乳)	November 25, 2004
2	"Hot Milk Take 2"; Transliteration: "Hotto Miruku Gyūnyū take 2" (Japanese: ホットミルク牛乳 take 2)	November 25, 2004
2	"Hot Milk Take 3"; Transliteration: "Hotto Miruku Gyūnyū take 3" (Japanese: ホットミルク牛乳 take 3)	November 25, 2004
3	"Fight Between Kids"; Transliteration: "Kodomo no Kenka" (Japanese: こどものけんか)	December 22, 2004
3	"Shimako's Feelings"; Transliteration: "Shimako no Kimochi" (Japanese: 志摩子のきもち)	December 22, 2004
4	"Below the Cherry Blossoms: Actress Shimako"; Transliteration: "Sakura no Shita de: Joyū Shimako" (Japanese: 桜の下で 女優 志摩子)	February 9, 2005
4	"The Evaluation of Noriko"; Transliteration: "Noriko o Shinasadame" (Japanese: 乃梨子を品定め)	February 9, 2005
4	"Noriko's War Cry"; Transliteration: "Noriko no Otakebi" (Japanese: 乃梨子のおたけび)	February 9, 2005
5	"In the Rain: Actress Shimako 2"; Transliteration: "Ame no Naka: Joyū Shimako Sono 2" (Japanese: 雨の中 女優 志摩子 その2)	February 25, 2005
5	"Rei and Yoshino Have Tea"; Transliteration: "Rei to Yoshino no Ocha" (Japanese: 令と由乃のお茶)	February 25, 2005
6	"Sachiko-onē-sama! 1"; Transliteration: "Sachiko-onē-sama! Sono 1" (Japanese: 祥子お姉さま! その1)	April 1, 2005
6	"Sachiko-onē-sama! 2"; Transliteration: "Sachiko-onē-sama! Sono 2" (Japanese: 祥子お姉さま! その2)	April 1, 2005
6	"Reunion with Sei"; Transliteration: "Sei to no Saikai" (Japanese: 聖との再会)	April 1, 2005
6	"Kei's Dryer"; Transliteration: "Kei no Doraiyā" (Japanese: 景のドライヤー)	April 1, 2005
6	"Yoko-sama Appears"; Transliteration: "Yōko-sama Tōjō" (Japanese: 蓉子様登場)	April 1, 2005
6	"Good Day to You"; Transliteration: "Gokigen'yō" (Japanese: ごきげんよう)	April 1, 2005

== Maria-sama ga Miteru (2006-2007) ==
No.	Title	French title	Original release date
1	"Vacation of the Lambs"; Transliteration: "Kohitsuji-tachi no Kyūka" (Japanese: 子羊たちの休暇)	Les Vacances Des Agnelles	November 29, 2006
Sachiko takes Yumi for a holiday in her summer home. While there, Sachiko's acquaintances make trouble for them.
2	"Codename Operation OK"; Transliteration: "Ryaku Shite Ōkē Daisakusen" (Japanese: 略してOK大作戦)	L`opèration «code OK»	January 29, 2007
Lillian and Hanandera collaborate on a school festival, and Yumi tries to fix Sachiko's hatred for men.
3	"Cool Breeze"; Transliteration: "Suzukaze Satsu-satsu" (Japanese: 涼風さつさつ)	Un souffle d'air frais	March 28, 2007
Hosokawa Kanako, a first year, sees Yumi as the ultimate embodiment of perfection. When preparations for the Hanadera Festival begins, Kanako tries to keep Yumi away from it due to her hatred of men and her fear of having Yumi be corrupted.
4	"Ready, Go!"; Transliteration: "Redī, Gō!" (Japanese: レディ、GO!)	Allez les filles!	May 30, 2007
Lillian's School Athletic Festival begins, and Kanako and Yumi make a bet to settle the problems which began between them last episode.
5	"Ciao Sorella!"; Transliteration: "Chao Sorerra!" (Japanese: チャオ ソレッラ!)	TBA	July 25, 2007
The second year students go for a week's study-vacation in Italy. Yumi meets up with Shizuka Kanina while there and there are rumors of another surprise visitor to Italy whom they all know.

=== Maria-sama ni wa Naisho (2006-2007) ===
No.	Title	Original release date
1	"Avant Championship"; Transliteration: "Aban Senshuken" (Japanese: アバン選手権)	November 29, 2006
1	"Maria-sama is..." Transliteration: "Maria-sama ga..." (Japanese: マリア様が...)	November 29, 2006
1	"Rendezvous"; Transliteration: "Machiawase" (Japanese: 待ち合わせ)	November 29, 2006
1	"Squirrel"; Transliteration: "Risu" (Japanese: リス)	November 29, 2006
1	"Something Lost"; Transliteration: "Wasuremono" (Japanese: 忘れもの)	November 29, 2006
1	"Worry"; Transliteration: "Nayamigoto" (Japanese: 悩み事)	November 29, 2006
2	"Another Avant"; Transliteration: "Anazā Aban" (Japanese: アナザーアバン)	January 29, 2007
2	"Alice-chan"; Transliteration: "Arisu-chan" (Japanese: ありすちゃん)	January 29, 2007
3	"Kanako"; Transliteration: "Kanako" (Japanese: 可南子)	March 28, 2007
3	"Kanako 2"; Transliteration: "Kanako Sono 2" (Japanese: 可南子 その2)	March 28, 2007
3	"Alice-kun"; Transliteration: "Arisu-kun" (Japanese: ありすくん)	March 28, 2007
3	"Alice-kun 2"; Transliteration: "Arisu-kun Sono 2" (Japanese: ありすくん その2)	March 28, 2007
3	"Another Avant After"; Transliteration: "Anazā Aban after" (Japanese: アナザーアバン after)	March 28, 2007
4	"Kanako Once Again"; Transliteration: "Mata Mata Mata Kanako" (Japanese: また また また可南子)	May 30, 2007
4	"Cosplay"; Transliteration: "Kosupure" (Japanese: こすぷれ)	May 30, 2007
5	"Souvenir"; Transliteration: "Miyage" (Japanese: 土産)	July 25, 2007

== Maria-sama ga Miteru (2009) ==
No.	Title	French title	Original release date
1	"Big Shock at the School Festival²"; Transliteration: "Gakuensai wa Shokku²" (Japanese: 学園祭はショック²)	De choc en choc à la fête de l'école	January 3, 2009
Yumi and the Yamayurikai prepare a production (Torikaebaya Monogatari) for the upcoming school festival with the neighboring boys school, Hanadera. The lead characters are to be Yumi and Yuuki, as Sachiko does not want to act.
2	"Just One Ordinary Day"; Transliteration: "Tokubetsu de Nai Tada no Ichinichi" (Japanese: 特別でないただの一日)	Une Journée Ordinaire	January 10, 2009
The day of the School Festival has arrived, there are many attractions but most importantly, the drama club is performing Little Women and the Yamayurikai are performing Torikaebaya monogatari. With so much going on, the day might not just be another ordinary day.
3	"Soeur Audition"; Transliteration: "Sūru Ōdishon" (Japanese: 妹(スール)オーディション)	L'audition des soeurs	January 17, 2009
Yoshino and Yumi are feeling the pressure to find students to be their petite soeurs. Yoshino suggests that they have a Soeur Audition to do just the thing.
4	"The Future Soeur"; Transliteration: "Mirai no Imōto" (Japanese: 未来の妹)	La future sœur	January 24, 2009
The day of the Soeur Audition—turned into Tea Party—arrives, and soon the Kendo Competition, as well. Yoshino has been looking forward to the Kendo competition, but she has promised Eriko that she will have a petite soeur by then. Someone catches Yoshino's eye, but it looks like it might be more complicated than it seems.
5	"The Sigh of the Red Rose"; Transliteration: "Benibara no Tameiki" (Japanese: 紅薔薇のため息)	La soupir de la rose rouge	January 31, 2009
Yumi and Sachiko finally go on their date to the amusement park. However, Kashiwagi and Yuuki turn up, with Kashiwagi bearing a certain agenda in mind. Yumi learns a few things and Kashiwagi's intentions are made clear.
6	"The Surprise Guest"; Transliteration: "Yoki senu Kyakujin" (Japanese: 予期せぬ客人)	L'invitée surprise	February 7, 2009
Tōko suddenly shows up on Yumi's doorstep in a strange situation and ends up being over for dinner, while Suguru and Yumi have an agreement. As well, Rei and Sachiko have an understanding.
7	"Blank Map of the Future"; Transliteration: "Mirai no Hakuchizu" (Japanese: 未来の白地図)	La Carte Vierge	February 14, 2009
The Yamayurikai Christmas party takes place. Tōko and Kanako are both invited to the party, but afterwards, Tōko rejects Yumi's offer of the rosary, and Yumi is crushed.
8	"The Other Side of the Clouded Glass."; Transliteration: "Kumori Garasu no Mukō Gawa" (Japanese: くもりガラスの向こう側)	L'autre face de la vitre embuée	February 21, 2009
Yumi and the rest of the Yamayurikai are invited for a female-only new year party, where Yumi has an interesting dream that could be applied to her current situation.
9	"The Masked Actress"; Transliteration: "Kamen no Akutoresu" (Japanese: 仮面のアクトレス)	L'actrice masquée	February 28, 2009
With the elections for the next year's Student Council approaching, Tōko unexpectedly enters the race with murky intentions.
10	"The Keychain"; Transliteration: "Kīhorudā" (Japanese: キーホルダー)	Le porte clef	March 7, 2009
Sachiko and Suguru Kashiwagi discuss Tōko's entry in the Student Council elections and her recent behavior towards Yumi. The Lillian Newspaper Club organizes another card hunt event for Valentine's Day, while Noriko worries that Yumi has given up on Tōko. As well, the Gigantea soeurs have a small discussion about the 'next Rose'.
11	"Keyhole of the Heart"; Transliteration: "Hāto no Kagiana" (Japanese: ハートの鍵穴)	La serrure du cœur	March 14, 2009
As different people in her life try to help her find happiness, Tōko continues to run away from their support. Suguru warns Tōko that if she continues to run away, one day no one will chase after her. More details of Tōko's family situation and her reason for refusing to be Yumi's petite soeur are revealed.
12	"Crisscross"; Transliteration: "Kurisukurosu" (Japanese: クリスクロス)	L'entrecroisé	March 21, 2009
After Tōko realizes her large misunderstanding, crying, she is comforted by Noriko. The next week, the Valentine's Day Card Hunt for the Next Roses take place with surprising results. Sachiko and Tōko have an interesting conversation on the stairs, and eventually Tōko comes to realize something vital to her relationship with Yumi.
13	"In Search of You"; Transliteration: "Anata o Sagashi ni" (Japanese: あなたを探しに)	Les retrouv ailles	March 28, 2009
The Valentine's Day dates take place, with Chisato Tanuma finding Yoshino's card and Tōko finding Yumi's. During Tōko and Yumi's date, even more about Tōko's past is revealed, as well as her reasons for running away from home. They eventually visit the hospital owned by Tōko's grandfather, and Touko slowly starts to open up to Yumi. The season ends with Yumi's thought of Tōko accepting her rosary.

=== Maria-sama ni wa Naisho (2009) ===
No.	Title	Original release date
1	"Sachiko's Idea"; Transliteration: "Sachiko no Aidia" (Japanese: 祥子のアイディア)	March 25, 2009
2	"Oden Ingredients"; Transliteration: "Oden no Gu" (Japanese: おでんの具)	March 25, 2009
3	"Ideal Little Sister"; Transliteration: "Risō no Imōto" (Japanese: 理想の妹)	April 24, 2009
4	"Noriko's World..."; Transliteration: "Noriko no Sekai..." (Japanese: 乃梨子の世界...)	April 24, 2009
5	"Yumi's Room"; Transliteration: "Yumi no Heya" (Japanese: 祐巳の部屋)	May 22, 2009
5	"Yumi's Room 2"; Transliteration: "Yumi no Heya Sono 2" (Japanese: 祐巳の部屋 その2)	May 22, 2009
5	"Yumi's Room 3"; Transliteration: "Yumi no Heya Sono 3" (Japanese: 祐巳の部屋 その3)	May 22, 2009
6	"Older Sister? Little Sister?"; Transliteration: "Ane? Imōto?" (Japanese: 姉?妹?)	June 24, 2009
7	"I Wish it Goes Well..."; Transliteration: "Yokare to Omotte..." (Japanese: よかれと思って...)	July 24, 2009
8	"Telepathy"; Transliteration: "Ishin Denshin" (Japanese: 以心伝心)	July 24, 2009
9	"The Daruma..."; Transliteration: "Daruma-san ga..." (Japanese: だるまさんが...)	August 21, 2009
10	"The Truth is, I..."; Transliteration: "Jitsu wa Watashi..." (Japanese: 実は わたし...)	August 21, 2009
11	"Mystery Tour"; Transliteration: "Misuterī Tsuā" (Japanese: ミステリーツアー)	August 21, 2009
