= Reine Hibiki =

Japanese manga artist

- Born: 15 November; Hitachi, Ibaraki Prefecture, Japan
- Occupation: Illustrator
- Known for: Maria-sama ga Miteru (illustrations)
- Website: hiviki.exblog.jp

Reine Hibiki (ひびき 玲音, Hibiki Reine) is a Japanese illustrator, born November 15 in Hitachi, Ibaraki Prefecture, Japan. She is a graduate of Joshibi University of Art and Design Junior College. Her work includes illustrating the Maria-sama ga Miteru series of light novels.

== Works ==
=== Light novels ===
Hibiki is co-creator of the light novel series Karen Broadcasting Club (カレン坂高校 可憐放送部, Karenzakakōkō Karenhōsōbu; literally "Karen Hill Highschool Cute Broadcasting Club"). The series originated in 2006 as a dōjinshi project by the circle MAGIXX, with related goods sold at that summer's Comic Market. However, by 2007 it had become a commercial publication by Shueisha. The novels' co-author is Beni Suzumoto (鈴本 紅, Suzumoto Beni) from MAGIXX.

As of May 2009, four volumes of the light novel have been published in Japan:

Volume	Title	Publication Date	ISBN
1	Karen Broadcasting Club (カレン坂高校 可憐放送部, Karenzakakōkō Karenhōsōbu)	2007-08-01	ISBN 978-4-08-601049-8
2	Guided Answer (カレン坂高校 可憐放送部 導かれた解答, Michibikareta Kaitō)	2007-11-01	ISBN 978-4-08-601088-7
3	Determination and Hand-mic (カレン坂高校 可憐放送部 決意とハンドマイク, Ketsui to Handomaiku)	2008-03-01	ISBN 978-4-08-601134-1
4	The Anti-Principal Declaration (カレン坂高校 可憐放送部 反校長宣言, Hankōchō Sengen)	2008-06-03	ISBN 978-4-08-601169-3

Shueisha has also released one drama CD for the series:

Volume	Title	Publication Date	ISBN
1	Karen Broadcasting Club (カレン坂高校 可憐放送部, Karenzakakōkō Karenhōsōbu)	2008-03-28	ISBN 978-4-08-901163-8

=== Illustration ===
- Bodyguard (ボディガード) light novels by Riuto Takeuchi (たけうち りうと, Takeuchi Riuto)
- Maria-sama ga Miteru light novels by Oyuki Konno (今野 緒雪, Konno Oyuki), including the Buddha Watches Too spin-off
- Throne of the Oracle (神語りの玉座, Kamigatari no Gyokuza) light novels by Yuira Nagino (薙野 ゆいら, Nagino Yuira)
- Calamity Knight: Alternative (カラミティナイト－オルタナティブ－) light novels by Kanata Takase (高瀬 彼方, Takese Kanata)

=== Video games ===
- True Fortune (トゥルーフォーチュン) (2008 PlayStation 2 game, character design)

=== Other ===
- Aquarian Age (contributing artist)
- Comic Yuri Hime (cover art)
- First Love Sisters (character design)
- Yuri Shimai (cover art)

== Dōjinshi ==
From 1994 to 1996, Hibiki was a member of the dōjinshi circle IN-FECT with Asako Takaboshi (高星 麻子, Takaboshi Asako), who went on to become illustrator of the Hakushaku to Yōsei light novels. From 1997 onwards, Hibiki has published dōjinshi through her own circle Russian Blue. Early Russian Blue works were often collaborations with other artists and based on Final Fantasy characters. More recent works include the True Colors series of rough illustrations, which are sold at each Comic Market.
