= The Earl and the Fairy =

Japanese light novel series & its adaptations

- Cover of the first The Earl and the Fairy light novel

伯爵と妖精 (Hakushaku to Yōsei)
- Genre: Fantasy, romance
- Light novel
- Written by: Mizue Tani
- Illustrated by: Asako Takaboshi
- Published by: Shueisha
- English publisher: NA: J-Novel Club
- Magazine: Cobalt
- Original run: March 3, 2004 – December 27, 2013
- Volumes: 33
- Manga
- Written by: Mizue Tani
- Illustrated by: Ayuko
- Published by: Shueisha
- English publisher: NA: Viz Media
- Magazine: Margaret
- Original run: August 23, 2008 – April 24, 2010
- Volumes: 4
- Anime television series
- Directed by: Kōichirō Sōtome
- Written by: Noriko Nagao
- Studio: Artland
- Licensed by: NA: Sentai Filmworks
- Original network: AT-X, Chiba TV, KBS, Sun Television, TV Aichi, tvk, Teletama
- Original run: September 28, 2008 – December 23, 2008
- Episodes: 12
- Video game

Hakushaku to Yōsei: Yume to Kizuna ni Omoi o Hasete
- Developer: 5pb.
- Publisher: 5pb.
- Genre: Visual novel
- Platform: PlayStation 2
- Released: April 30, 2009

The Earl and the Fairy (Japanese: 伯爵と妖精, Hepburn: Hakushaku to Yōsei) is a completed series of light novels written by Mizue Tani and published in Japan by Shueisha. The story is serialized in Cobalt magazine and illustrated by Asako Takaboshi (Ayuko).

Shueisha has commercially released two drama CDs and a manga adaptation began serialization in Margaret in the September issue in 2008 and ended in the May issue in 2010.

An anime adaptation was broadcast from September to December 2008. A visual novel for the PlayStation 2 was released on April 30, 2009.

== Plot ==
=== Story ===
The story, set in Victorian Britain, follows the adventures of 17-year-old Lydia Carlton, nicknamed the "Fairy Doctor" due to her understanding of fairies. Her life takes a 180-degree turn when she meets Edgar J. C. Ashenbert, the "Legendary Blue Knight Earl" and his crew on a sea voyage to London. Edgar hires her as an advisor during his quest to obtain a treasured sword that was supposed to be handed down to him by his family.

=== Characters ===
Lydia Carlton (リディア・カールトン, Ridia Kāruton)
Voiced by: Nana Mizuki (Japanese); Azucena Martinez (Latin American Spanish)
Lydia Carlton, the daughter of Professor Carlton, is a 17 year old fairy doctor who was born and raised in Scotland. She has the rare power to see fairies, an ability inherited from her mother. Lydia has green eyes, a trait of those with the gift to see fairies. (Her eyes are green-gold) and a red hair. She is independent and kind, and doesn't hesitate to help others. She ends up working for Edgar as his consultant on fairy-related matters after helping him retrieve the Merrow's Sword (key to him being recognized as the Blue Knight Earl by the Queen of England). Her goal is to become a full-fledged fairy doctor, and frequently places herself in danger willingly when it comes to anything to do with problems between humans and fairies.
She appears to have some self-esteem issues, referring to her own hair as "rust-colored" and comparing herself to her mother, who was apparently a woman of considerable beauty. Everyone who knew her mother before she died says they don't look anything alike. Once, in an outburst, she confesses to Paul Ferman she thinks she isn't cute at all, and it's part of the reason why she tries so hard to help in other ways (by working hard).
Her physical differences from her parents also lead her to wonder if she is, in fact, a changeling. It is later revealed she is indeed part fairy. Her mother, Aurora, was half-fairy (due to familial circumstances forced the real Aurora to be exchanged with a half-blood changeling.)
Because of past difficulties, Lydia dislikes the idea of falling in love and even seems to be afraid of it. When she was a child, she was given a love letter by a boy who - as it turns out later - was dared to do so by his friends, crushing her. She used a "spell" to ward off Kelpie so he would not come near her, as his aggressive advances were troublesome to her. At first, she also rejects Edgar's advances and brushes them off, but as she falls in love with him, she demonstrates substantially less distrust of his confessions of love.
Lydia is considered Edgar's fiancée, a status she vehemently denies, despite Edgar's overt courtship of her and multiple fairies calling her that. She obtained this status when she accepted a moonstone ring (previously owned by Gwendolen, the countess of one of the past Blue Knight Earls before Edgar), which effectively meant she accepted his proposal. The moonstone ring apparently has some protective powers of its own; it prevented Lydia's soul from being fully trapped by the fairy world in volume 6 of the novel series, as well as enabled Lydia to break Kelpie's spell on her when he tried to bring her to the fairy world by magic (to prevent her from being hurt in the crossfire between Edgar and the Prince). Though Lydia despises Edgar in the beginning, it is known she has undressed herself in front of him when spilling tea on her dress. When this incident occurs Edgar is outside the bed room door observing Lydia change, which makes him want her more than before for her beauty and personality.
Recently, Lydia has truly accepted Edgar's proposal, and afterwards it is shown Lydia has hence been accepted as part of the Blue Earl Knight's family (as Edgar's fiancee). When she takes what should have been a fatal blow from the Blue Earl Knight's sword, she emerges unscathed, proof the sword has acknowledged her as the Knight's family. Following this revelation, she becomes able to form a shining bow from Gwendolen's moonstone ring, and is able to use it to repel Unseelie Court.
Strangely, even though he is the Blue Earl Knight, the sword still inflicts physical harm on Edgar. This is supposedly because Edgar's blood has been "dirtied".
Edgar J. C. Ashenbert (エドガー・J・C・アシェンバート, Edogā J C Ashenbāto)
Voiced by: Hikaru Midorikawa (Japanese); Miguel de León (Latin American Spanish)
Edgar is a flirtatious man in his early twenties with very distinctive ash mauve eyes. When he was young his parents were both murdered and he himself was thought to be dead. As a result, he was shipped to America as a white slave. He was subsequently framed as a mass murderer and forced to flee from America for his alleged crimes. Stripped of his honorable name, Edgar embarks on a journey to find the famed Sword of Merrow. By obtaining the sword, Edgar hopes to assert himself as the "Earl of the Blue Knights" thus acquiring a respectable title and gaining a fabricated sense of honor. In his quest to find the Sword of the Merrow, Edgar captures Lydia Carlton, believing her eyes to be the key to finding the legendary sword. He gradually falls in love with Lydia and is frustrated and confused she continually avoids his advances. He openly shows his love for her, in ways which Lydia often feel are embarrassing. He tells her it makes him uneasy to see her communicate with other men so easily and is unnerved by her friendship with Paul.
Edgar was heir to a dukedom (the highest rank in the British peerage) before his family was murdered. He was then captured by an organization headed by a mysterious figure known only as the Prince. There, he was groomed to be the Prince's successor, learning all the knowledge the Prince possessed, including how to ruthlessly make use of the people around him. Later, he managed to successfully flee the organization, taking Ermine and Raven with him, among other supporters. However, on more than one occasion, Edgar has wondered whether he is becoming more like the Prince by making use of the techniques taught him by the Prince in his quest for survival after his escape.
Later, it is revealed the Prince murdered his parents to capture Edgar, believing him to be the most suitable successor to the Prince's name. This is because Edgar was of both royal blood, and blood related to the Prince, and would hence easily absorb the Prince's memories. This is quite literal, in that the Prince was a title carried by several generations of Princes. Each generation would groom a new successor by breaking the Prince-to-be's own self-consciousness and forcing him to learn the original prince's knowledge, mannerisms, behavior, etc. to the point that when the Prince transfers the memories from the entire lineage of Princes into the Prince-to-be, the new Prince accepts the memories so naturally that he believes himself to be the Prince.
Edgar was also trained as such, but he retained his own personality and will, and was not broken when he fled the organization. After meeting Lydia, as well, he begins to recall his kinder side that had been pushed under in his desperate bid to escape, and becomes increasingly less "Prince-like". He maintains, though, that he cannot fully let go of the knowledge he learned by the Prince's side, because they are weapons that he needs in order to protect his loved ones.
Later, in order to save Lydia, he steals the Freya (a red gem created by a powerful wyrm, that is able to absorb and transfer memories) containing Prince's memories. In doing so, he absorbs the memories and effectively becomes the Prince. However, Edgar still retains his original personality, although he is also shown to be deeply uneasy about how long he could keep his own will.
He quickly maneuvers events such that Lydia becomes his fiancee. He does, however, maintain relations with other paramours for some time even after claiming engagement to Lydia, which makes her ever more distrustful of his advances. Later, he decides to be truly faithful to Lydia alone.
It is shown that as time progresses, he falls deeper in love with her; in the beginning of their partnership, he treats Lydia as a pawn (he uses her as bait without her consent to lure his enemy out into the open, although notably he also attempts to protect her by ordering Raven to trail her). At the time, Lydia mused that she's in an extremely ambiguous position, in that she is enough of an outsider that Edgar treats her as a pawn, but enough of a comrade that Edgar feels an obligation to protect her.
However, later, Edgar becomes uncertain of the wisdom of involving her in the battle between the Prince and himself, as he cannot guarantee her safety. It comes to the point that he continuously contradicts himself by wanting to keep Lydia with him, but also wanting to keep her safe by pushing her far away from himself.
He is severely possessive, and it has been noted by Lydia that he "cannot tolerate anything that belongs to him being taken away by another". This possessiveness extends to Lydia also; Edgar has been known to become jealous of many men who appear interested in Lydia, or whom Lydia are friendly with. On one occasion, when Raven accidentally saw Lydia dressed in a revealing Arabic costume, Edgar commands him to forget what he saw.
Initially, his driving goal was revenge on the Prince for murdering his family, no matter the sacrifice. In order to achieve this goal, he cares little for his own life. After the Ashenbert family's banshee saved him at the cost of her own life and entrusted the key to the land of Ibrazel to him, however, he tells Lydia that his thinking has changed, and now he understands that as the current Blue Knight Earl, even if he does not possess the ability to see fairies, he will persevere and find a way to defeat the Prince as the duty that comes with his title. He also tells her that he will no longer treat the preservation of his own life as cavalierly as he did before.
Raven (レイヴン, Reivun)
Voiced by: Tomokazu Sugita (Japanese); Ditter Ruiz (Latin American Spanish)
Raven is 18 years old at the beginning of the series, and Edgar's personal servant. He is Ermine's half-brother. He possesses mysterious green eyes and exceptional fighting skills. It is revealed that Raven was born with a sprite residing within him, and for this reason he was not acknowledged by many. Edgar has mastery over the sprite, and hence Raven. According to Raven, Edgar would never take advantage of this power. And because Edgar accepts him despite his obscurities, Raven is pleased to serve him.
When Raven and Ermine were young, they were taken in by Prince's organization. Raven was then trained by fighting masters, but due to the speed at which he surpassed them, and his inability to control his sprite's killing impulses, as well as his own indifference to killing them in the course of his training, he eventually ended up being chained and locked away. This was where he met Edgar for the first time, when Ermine brought Edgar to meet Raven, telling her brother that "she had found his master". While the sprite within Raven was supposed to serve and protect the king of Raven's (and Ermine's) tribe, Raven immediately accepted Edgar as such. It was then that he received the name "Raven", which Edgar gave him to signify that he was to be the master of his sprite from now on, instead of the other way around.
It is shown, however, that the sprite's obedience to Edgar is not absolute. When the sprite's killing lusts override Raven's own will, even Edgar is unable to stop it.
Later on, it is revealed that there are two sprites within him; one of them is a giant serpent, and the other as a giant bird. The giant serpent is the original servant of his tribe's king, while the giant bird is a manifestation of one of three magical gems sealed within Raven. This is hinted at early on in the series, when Kelpie met Raven for the first time and was unable to immediately identify whether he was a "snake" or a "bird".
His loyalty to Edgar is virtually absolute, and Edgar believes from the bottom of his heart that Raven is one of the few who will stand by him no matter what. He will attempt to accomplish every task Edgar assigns him, even if that includes standing by while Edgar is in danger.
Because he was treated as a killing machine in the past, Raven has become almost emotionless, responding to the commands of those he obeys, and very little else. As the series wears on, however, he begins to show emotions of his own, a fact Edgar is glad about. He also becomes more receptive to other peoples' emotions and begins to display consideration towards them. Together with the slow regaining of normal human emotions, he also begins to express opinions to Edgar, such as stopping Edgar from irritating Nico, and butting in sharply when another woman attempts to seduce him (because he understands that Edgar giving in would have repercussions on Edgar's and Lydia's relationship).
He is deeply happy about Lydia marrying Edgar, and is, in fact, frequently anxious that Edgar might do something that would make her turn away from him. Once, when Edgar asked him which female Raven thought suitable to be his countess, he answered that he would prefer Lydia to be the one.
His relationship with his half-sister Ermine seems rather distant, due to his upbringing. He places Edgar far above Ermine, and sought to kill her after her second betrayal. However, he was also the one who pleaded with Edgar on Ermine's behalf to allow her to serve Edgar again after her first betrayal, and he had also hidden his suspicions about Ermine from Edgar briefly despite his overwhelming loyalty to Edgar.
He apparently does not like how young/childish his face appears, as he was noted by Ermine to have brooded over how a couple of maids thought he was only 15 years old. He is apprenticing under Tompkins in order to learn the skills of a butler. Lydia surmised that this is in preparation for the day Edgar defeats the Prince and obtains true peace, and Raven's fighting skills will no longer be useful to Edgar.
He forges a tentative friendship with Nico, standing up for Nico in the face of Kelpie's wrath.
Nico (ニコ, Niko)
Voiced by: Hiro Yūki (Japanese); Javier Rivero (Latin American Spanish)
Nico is a fairy who takes on the form of a cat. He accompanies Lydia on her journey with Edgar.
While he can walk on four legs like a normal cat, he prefers to walk on two legs like a human. He is able to turn invisible, and can read and write human language. Nico was Lydia's mother's companion, as well.
He likes liquor, and fine tea. He is also very particular about being treated like a gentleman rather than a cat, and as such obsesses over his attire (most frequently a single neck ribbon, but he has been known to wear suits and tailcoats), and the state of his fur and whiskers. On a few occasions, Edgar has provoked him deliberately by scratching Nico and petting him like a mere cat.
He is rather cowardly, often disappearing when things turn nasty. Despite his inability/unwillingness to engage in physical combat, his assistance is valuable to Lydia. He often gathers information for Lydia from the fairies in the area, as well as acts as a guide when Lydia needs to travel to or from the fairy world. He is also something of an adviser to Lydia.
In recent times, Edgar has taken to bribing Nico with things like fine food or a gentleman's "essentials" (a cane, a tailcoat, letter-writing set, etc.), in order to find out developments around Lydia.
Ermine (アーミン, Āmin)
Voiced by: Sayaka Ohara (Japanese); Sandra Pavón (Latin American Spanish)
Raven's half-sister and Edgar's dear friend. Edgar would do anything for her if it will make her happy. She is a beautiful woman who has fine fighting skills (though she is not on par with Raven), with short black hair, snow-white skin, and a womanly allure that "is not dimmed by her wearing male clothes" most of the time.
She was in love with Edgar, and the Prince used this fact to his advantage and turned her spy against Edgar. Later, she confesses her betrayal to Edgar and commits suicide by jumping into the sea.
Later, she is revived by the Selkies on Ulysses's command, and becomes a Selkie. After reuniting with Edgar's group, she serves him for a further amount of time before betraying him yet again. The reason for her betrayal is yet unknown, but she claims to Kelpie that her soul's master is and always will be Edgar. In addition, she attempts to discreetly tip the scales in Edgar and co.'s favor when she can, such as by dropping hints to Kelpie; she tells him that there's a reason why she must not be kicked out of Prince's organization yet, but does not state it openly.
While she does not openly express her affection for Raven, she has been shown to worry about him.
Later on, Ermine relates to Lydia that when they were still under the Prince's organization, she was the woman "given" to Edgar (as his sexual partner). Edgar, however, refused to touch her because he understood that it was the Prince's way of training Edgar's sexual inclinations to match his own. When the Prince realized this, he raped her in front of Edgar.
Lydia believes that Ermine is the one whom Edgar truly loves (she bases this conclusion on a few things, like how Edgar is never flirtatious towards her - Lydia takes this as a sign that Edgar loves her so deeply he cannot bring himself to be shallow with Ermine - as well as him muttering her name before falling into sleep while holding Lydia). As such, even after she is vaguely conscious of her feelings towards Edgar, she continues to reject acknowledging them as it would be too painful for her to be with Edgar if his heart is with another. However, it was truly hinted in the light novel how Edgar had only considered Ermine as family, wanting her to be a woman just like others.
Kelpie (ケルピー, Kerupī)
Voiced by: Takehito Koyasu (Japanese); Pablo Mejía (Latin American Spanish)
An impolite and arrogant water horse[Celtic folklore] who aggressively pursues Lydia. Bound by the moon spell, which drives away unwanted advances from fairies, Kelpie must bring Lydia the "moon" in order to win her over, although it's clear to everyone but Kelpie she has no interest in him. He follows Lydia all the way to London to bring her back to Scotland. Despite his aggressiveness, Kelpie genuinely loves and cares for Lydia, and comforts her when she's confused (though she protests at times).
His true form is that of a black horse, while his human form is that of an attractive young man with dark hair and eyes (his pupils are white swirls). His eyes are able to bewitch both men and women alike, and he has relatively strong magical powers. He has the ability to purify water and cleanse toxins.
"Kelpie" is the name of his species, and not his given name Cain. He and Lydia first met in Scotland. At the time, a middle-aged woman came to Lydia with her tale of a young man whom she was in love with. Lydia discovers that the man is a Kelpie; the younger brother of the Kelpie that wants to marry Lydia. After being convinced of their love, Lydia eventually aids the woman and younger Kelpie in their relationship.
Despite first appearances, Kelpie (for the sake of the rest of this article, Kelpie shall refer to the main story's Kelpie) demonstrates considerable concern for Lydia. He has saved Lydia (and inadvertently, Edgar and Co. as well) on several occasions, and has gotten hurt on one occasion in her defense. He recuperates quickly when in water. At least twice, he has tried to protect Lydia by taking her from Edgar's side, as he believes that her being by Edgar is dangerous for Lydia. He is also considerate of Lydia's feelings; rather than blaming her when she broke the spirit of their deal (that she would stay in the fairy world with him if Kelpie would save Edgar), he told her that he would wait until she no longer had anything holding her back in the human world.
He continues to stand by Lydia even after she chooses Edgar over himself, and once told Lydia that she is the first fairy doctor to have obtained a Kelpie. (Kelpies are, as a rule, feared by most other beings as they feed on almost anything they can kill, including fairies.)
When Edgar first meets Kelpie, he takes an instant dislike to the fairy because of Kelpie's good looks. Because Edgar believes that most of his own allure comes from his charming looks and silver tongue, he's wary of other men with similar beauty.
Typically Kelpies will take a female human form. Kelpie's own male form with his dark locks of hair may be a nod to the Manx [Glashtyn].
Paul Ferman (ポール・ファーマン, Pōru Fāman)
Voiced by: Hiroshi Kamiya (Japanese); Victor Ugarte (Latin American Spanish)
Paul is a human in his late-twenties who is trying to become a great artist. He was invited to Edgar's ball, and met Lydia there. While helping Lydia, getting Kelpie off of her, the moon ring accidentally slipped onto his finger, and wouldn't come off. He seems to be on friendly terms with Lydia, though it makes both Kelpie and Edgar uneasy. His inspiration for art are the fairies, and he has always loved them but cannot see them, so he doesn't know if they are real or not, but likes to believe they are.
His father was killed by the Prince's organization, and he has since joined an organization - the Scarlet Moon - that opposes the Prince's.
Paul had once aspired to be a poet, but after meeting Edgar as a child, he is persuaded by Edgar to pursue painting instead. Paul is devoted to Edgar for that piece of advice and encouragement. Later, Edgar tells Lydia in private that he persuaded Paul to do so because his poetry was so horrible that he would never make a living through it, while bad art could find at least find a buyer or two. However, despite his slightly dismissive words, Edgar remains a faithful customer of Paul's.
After finding out that Edgar had inherited the Prince's memories, he still decides to be loyal to Edgar, and states that Edgar was merely another victim, who sacrificed himself to protect his friends.
Professor Carlton (カールトン教授, Kāruton-kyōju)
Voiced by: Tōru Ōkawa (Japanese); Octavio Rojas (Latin American Spanish)
Lydia's father. He cares for his daughter deeply but isn't above calling her a tomboy.
He works as a professor in a London university, specializing in gems and minerals. Unlike the "younger" generation of researchers, he is not only knowledgeable on the scientific aspects of his specialization, but is also heavily interested in the romantic aspects of it; he has extensive knowledge on several famous gems and their stories.
He is accepting of the slightly dangerous nature of Lydia's job, and respects her decision in working as Edgar's consultant. He is, however, extremely suspicious of Edgar's intentions towards his young daughter, because he believes that noblemen would not seriously pursue women born into the lower classes.
Because he has been living apart from Lydia, it comes as something of a shock to him that she is already of marriageable age. (When he went to Mannon Island, he found Edgar and Lydia escaping from pursuers. Edgar takes the opportunity to glibly proclaim his undying love for her and ask for her hand in marriage, although Lydia immediately and heatedly protests the joke. This apparently "shocks" Carlton into realizing that Lydia has grown up.) Lydia has observed that his constant protests that she is "still a child" may reflect this.
However, he has lately approved of Lydia's and Edgar's engagement.
He eloped with Lydia's mother, Aurora, but the circumstances of their courtship are unknown to Lydia (who is understandably curious). In a sidestory, however, it transpires that he merely intended to "rescue" Aurora from her dismal fate in the Makhil family, and that Aurora was the one who proposed to him. He is extremely embarrassed about having been proposed to (instead of the other way around, as was the norm at the time), and intends to carry that particular secret to his grave.
Aurora (アウローラ, Aurōra)
Lydia's mother. She died before the beginning of the series. Lydia looks up to her, and she is the inspiration behind Lydia's determination to become a good fairy doctor.
Aurora was born in the Highlands, to the McKeel family (which has deep connections with fairy folk). However, she later learns that she was not her parents' true daughter, but a changeling. This is because of a deal that was made with a family of fairies.
According to lore, a Seer sleeps in the Highlands, who will one day awake to lead the battle against the "Prince of Disaster". In order to awake however, he requires life energy that is more potent in women, and more importantly, women carrying fairy blood. In order to ensure that such a woman is available for the Seer's awakening during times of crisis, the McKeel family has for generations traded their first-borns with a particular fairy family's first-borns, and essentially cross-mated them, thereby strengthening the life energy of the resulting offspring.
Aurora was one such changeling, but she rejected her fate and instead fled her homeland with Professor Carlton.
She died young, supposedly due to an illness. However, unknown to even Professor Carlton, she had once ventured into the Highlands and opened the Seer's coffin (19 years before the beginning of the series), and as such had her life drastically shortened.
Tompkins (トムキンス, Tomukinsu)
Voiced by: Chafurin (Japanese); Daniel Abundis (Latin American Spanish)
Edgar's kind butler who gives him advice regarding his love life here and there.
He has Merrow blood, and his face vaguely resembles a fish's. He also states that he has a fin on his back. When he met the leader of the Merrows for the first time, the leader mistook him for his ancestor, and said that "he is almost human now".
He takes pride in being able to accomplish any task related to his duties that Edgar gives him, no matter how rushed the deadline or how ludicrous it is.
Ulysses (ユリシス, Yurishisu)
Voiced by: Mamoru Miyano (Japanese); Ángel Rodríguez (Latin American Spanish)
A mysterious, young blonde man who has the power to see and communicate with fairies, just like Lydia. Unlike Lydia, however, his fae powers do not stop there, and he has been shown to be able to command fairies such as spectral hounds, a type of Unseelie Court (malicious fairy). This is later revealed to be because he is of the Blue Knight Earl's direct bloodline. He was, however, not recognized as an heir because his parents were not wed.
He has, in fact, attempted to obtain the Sword of the Merrow before (and hence establish himself as the Blue Knight Earl). But because he interpreted the last line of the fairies' riddle as the Merrow requiring a blood sacrifice in exchange for the sword as Edgar did initially, he was washed out to sea by the Merrow.
He was the one to command the Selkies to revive Ermine as a Selkie when she committed suicide by jumping into the sea.
Jimmy (ジミー, Jimī)
Has the appearance of a young boy with glasses and dark hair, but is really the favorite servant of Ulysses, being a member of the Unseelie Court. He is a spectral hound, and can shapeshift at will.
Before Lydia and the others knew what he was, he spied on them by acting as a messenger and friend of Slade and the Scarlet Moon organization, under Edgar.
Prince (プリンス, Purinsu)
A character shrouded in mystery. The original Prince was created in the Highlands, by making a human baby drink the essences of powerful Unseelie Court. By doing so, the human baby was infused with the knowledge and ability to manipulate Unseelie Court, as well as their arcane magic.
As a human, the Prince ages; however, through the use of Freyr (a red gem created by a powerful wyrm), he is able to transfer his memories and abilities to the next Prince, a candidate who is chosen and carefully groomed. The candidate is forced to learn and memorize all the current Prince's knowledge as well as mannerisms. As the grooming process goes on, the candidate eventually begins to lose his original personality. As such, when the Prince's memories are transferred, the candidate effectively believes himself to be the true Prince.
The "Prince" (really the current generation Prince) is the main antagonist of much of the beginning of the series, although he only makes his appearance in one of the later novels. He is apparently heavily disabled (he moves in a wheelchair and is wrapped in bandages due to burn scars), and as such only sends his henchmen at the beginning.
Later, when Edgar inherits the Prince's memories out of necessity, he instead begins to be hunted by those who seek death of the Prince. He also battles with the Prince's memories within him, and is deeply uneasy that he would eventually change into the Prince.
Gladys Ashenbert (グラーディス・アシェンバート, Gurādisu Ashenbāto)
The last of the Ashenbert main bloodline. (Ulysses is considered to be from a side-branch of the main family.) She is mentioned several times throughout the series, and died about a hundred years before the beginning of the series. As a woman, she was never officially recognized by the King of England as the Earl of Ibrazel.
It is revealed that she made herself into a "living sacrifice" in order to strengthen the London Bridge's barrier against Unseelie Court.

== Media ==
=== Light novels ===
As of December 2013, all 33 volumes of the light novel have been published in Japan by Shueisha.

The light novels are licensed digitally in English by J-Novel Club.

Volume	Title	Publication date	ISBN
1	Earl and Fairy: The Elegance of a Villain (伯爵と妖精 あいつは優雅な大悪党, Aitsu wa Yūgana Dai Akutō)	March 3, 2004	ISBN 978-4-08-600393-3
2	Earl and Fairy: Beware the Enticing Trap (伯爵と妖精 あまい罠には気をつけて)	September 1, 2004	ISBN 978-4-08-600474-9
3	Earl and Fairy: A Gentle Proposal (伯爵と妖精 プロポーズはお手やわらかに)	March 3, 2005	ISBN 978-4-08-600559-3
4	Earl and Fairy: The Spectral Lover (伯爵と妖精 恋人は幽霊)	June 1, 2005	ISBN 978-4-08-600599-9
5	Earl and Fairy: A Cursed Diamond Imbued with Love (伯爵と妖精 呪いのダイヤに愛をこめて)	September 1, 2005	ISBN 978-4-08-600640-8
6	Earl and Fairy: The Changeling Princess (伯爵と妖精 取り換えられたプリンセス)	November 1, 2005	ISBN 978-4-08-600664-4
7	Earl and Fairy: The Secret Behind Your Tears (伯爵と妖精 涙の秘密をおしえて)	March 31, 2006	ISBN 978-4-08-600747-4
8	Earl and Fairy: Awaiting a Moonlit Elopement (伯爵と妖精 駆け落ちは月夜を待って)	June 30, 2006	ISBN 978-4-08-600788-7
9	Earl and Fairy: Requiem for a Goddess (伯爵と妖精 女神に捧ぐ鎮魂歌)	October 3, 2006	ISBN 978-4-08-600826-6
10	Earl and Fairy: The Bright Star of London Bridge (伯爵と妖精 ロンドン橋に星は灯る)	March 1, 2007	ISBN 978-4-08-600883-9
11	Earl and Fairy: The Future Bride in a Labyrinth of Roses (伯爵と妖精 花嫁修業は薔薇迷宮で)	June 1, 2007	ISBN 978-4-08-601022-1
12	Earl and Fairy: How to Win Over a Gentleman (伯爵と妖精 紳士の射止めかた教えます)	October 2, 2007	ISBN 978-4-08-601076-4
13	(伯爵と妖精 紅の騎士に願うならば)	December 26, 2007	ISBN 978-4-08-601111-2
14	(伯爵と妖精 誰がために聖地は夢みる)	March 1, 2008	ISBN 978-4-08-601133-4
15	(伯爵と妖精 運命の赤い糸を信じますか?)	August 1, 2008	ISBN 978-4-08-601193-8
16	(伯爵と妖精 誓いのキスを夜明けまでに)	October 31, 2008	ISBN 978-4-08-601224-9
17	(伯爵と妖精 紳士淑女のための愛好者読本)	November 28, 2008	ISBN 978-4-08-601235-5
18	(伯爵と妖精 すてきな結婚式のための魔法)	January 30, 2009	ISBN 978-4-08-601254-6
19	(伯爵と妖精 魔都に誘われた新婚旅行)	March 28, 2009	ISBN 978-4-08-601284-3
20	(伯爵と妖精 月なき夜は鏡の国でつかまえて)	August 31, 2009	ISBN 978-4-08-601315-4
21	(伯爵と妖精 白い翼を継ぐ絆)	October 30, 2009	ISBN 978-4-08-601345-1
22	(伯爵と妖精 愛しき人へ十二夜の祈りを)	April 27, 2010	ISBN 978-4-08-601402-1
23	(伯爵と妖精 永久の想いを旋律にのせて)	July 30, 2010	ISBN 978-4-08-601432-8
24	(伯爵と妖精 愛の輝石を忘れないで)	December 1, 2010	ISBN 978-4-08-601471-7
25	(伯爵と妖精 あなたへ導く海の鎖)	March 1, 2011	ISBN 978-4-08-601500-4
26	(伯爵と妖精 情熱の花は秘せない)	June 10, 2011	ISBN 978-4-08-601528-8
27	(伯爵と妖精 真実の樹下で約束を)	October 10, 2011	ISBN 978-4-08-601565-3
28	(伯爵と妖精 恋よりもおだやかに見つめて)	January 10, 2012	ISBN 978-4-08-601594-3
29	(伯爵と妖精 オーロラの護りを胸に)	April 10, 2012	ISBN 978-4-08-601622-3
30	(伯爵と妖精 祝福の子か夜の使者か)	September 10, 2012	ISBN 978-4-08-601662-9
31	(伯爵と妖精 祈りよアルビオンの高みに届け)	January 10, 2013	ISBN 978-4-08-601691-9
32	(伯爵と妖精 白い丘に赤い月満ちて)	March 30, 2013	ISBN 978-4-08-601713-8
33	(伯爵と妖精 新たなるシルヴァンフォードにて)	December 27, 2013	ISBN 978-4-08-601776-3

=== Manga ===
As of March 2011, all four volumes of the manga adaptation of the series have been released by Shueisha under their Margaret Comics imprint. Viz Media has published the series under the name of The Earl and the Fairy in their Shojo Beat Manga label.

No.	Original release date	Original ISBN	English release date	English ISBN
01	November 25, 2008	978-4-08-846359-9	March 6, 2012	978-1-4215-4168-6
02	May 25, 2009	978-4-08-846410-7	June 5, 2012	978-1-4215-4169-3
03	January 25, 2010	978-4-08-846491-6	September 4, 2012	978-1-4215-4170-9
04	July 23, 2010	978-4-08-846553-1	December 4, 2012	978-1-4215-4171-6

=== Drama CDs ===
As of September 2008, two drama CDs have been published in Japan by Shueisha.

Volume	Title	Publication Date	ISBN
1	(伯爵と妖精 プロポーズはお手やわらかに)	June 29, 2007	ISBN 978-4-08-901154-6
2	(伯爵と妖精 紳士の射止めかた教えます)	May 9, 2008	ISBN 978-4-08-901164-5

=== Anime ===
An anime adaptation of the light novels was announced in February 2008. It ran from September 2008 through December 2008. There are 12 episodes. Kōichirō Sōtome directed the anime while the series composition was done by Noriko Nagao. The animated character designs was done by Maki Fujii while the animation was done by Artland. The anime was licensed by Discotek Media, but it expired. After it expired, Sentai Filmworks acquired the series.

The cast from the drama CDs was used for the anime adaptation.

== See also ==
- Raven of the Inner Palace - a light novel series illustrated by Ayuko.
