= Cobalt (magazine) =

Japanese bimonthly magazine by Shueisha

- Cover of the February 2006 issue, featuring art by Reine Hibiki
- Editor: Yayoi Tamura
- Categories: Light novel
- Frequency: Bimonthly
- Publisher: Shueisha
- Total circulation: 30,667 (2008)
- First issue: May 1976
- Country: Japan
- Based in: Tokyo
- Language: Japanese
- Website: cobalt.shueisha.co.jp

Cobalt (Japanese: コバルト, Hepburn: Kobaruto) is a bimonthly anthology of shōjo fiction, published in Japan by Shueisha since May 1976. Shueisha also publish light novels under their Cobalt imprint, many of which were originally serialized in the magazine.

== Serializations ==
- Akuma no Youna Anata
- Arina no Tane
- Brundage no Mahou no Shiro
- Hakuou no Sono (White Garden)
- Hayou no Tsurugi
- Kimi ni Todoke
- Listen to Me, Girls. I Am Your Father!
- Maria-sama ga Miteru (Maria Watches Over Us)
- Marmalade Boy
- Mirage of Blaze
- Oshaka-sama mo Miteru
- The Earl and the Fairy
