= Maria-sama ga Miteru =

Japanese light novel series and its franchise

- The first volume of Maria-sama ga Miteru, published in Japan by Shueisha on April 24, 1998

マリア様がみてる
- Genre: Class S, yuri
- Light novel
- Written by: Oyuki Konno
- Illustrated by: Reine Hibiki
- Published by: Shueisha
- Magazine: Cobalt
- Original run: April 24, 1998 – April 28, 2012
- Volumes: 37
- Manga
- Written by: Oyuki Konno
- Illustrated by: Satoru Nagasawa
- Published by: Shueisha
- Magazine: Margaret; The Margaret
- Original run: October 2003 – August 2010
- Volumes: 9
- Anime television series
- Directed by: Yukihiro Matsushita
- Written by: Reiko Yoshida
- Music by: Mikiya Katakura
- Studio: Studio Deen
- Licensed by: NA: Maiden Japan
- Original network: TV Tokyo
- English network: SEA: Animax
- Original run: January 7, 2004 – March 31, 2004
- Episodes: 13
- Original video animation

Maria-sama ni wa Naisho
- Directed by: Yukihiro Matsushita
- Studio: Studio Deen
- Licensed by: NA: Maiden Japan
- Released: April 2, 2004 – August 21, 2009
- Runtime: 1-2 minutes each
- Episodes: 29
- Anime television series

Maria-sama ga Miteru: Printemps
- Directed by: Yukihiro Matsushita
- Music by: Mikiya Katakura
- Studio: Studio Deen
- Licensed by: NA: Maiden Japan
- Original network: TV Tokyo
- English network: SEA: Animax
- Original run: July 4, 2004 – September 26, 2004
- Episodes: 13
- Original video animation
- Directed by: Yukihiro Matsushita
- Written by: Reiko Yoshida
- Music by: Mikiya Katakura
- Studio: Studio Deen
- Licensed by: NA: Maiden Japan
- Released: November 29, 2006 – July 25, 2007
- Runtime: 50 minutes each
- Episodes: 5
- Light novel

Oshaka-sama mo Miteru
- Written by: Oyuki Konno
- Illustrated by: Reine Hibiki
- Published by: Shueisha
- Magazine: Cobalt, Bessatsu Cobalt
- Original run: August 1, 2008 – November 30, 2013
- Volumes: 10
- Anime television series
- Directed by: Toshiyuki Kato
- Written by: Reiko Yoshida
- Music by: Mikiya Katakura
- Studio: Studio Deen
- Licensed by: NA: Maiden Japan
- Original network: AT-X
- Original run: January 3, 2009 – March 28, 2009
- Episodes: 13
- Live-action film
- Maria-sama ga Miteru (2010)

Maria-sama ga Miteru (マリア様がみてる; The Virgin Mary Is Watching or Maria Watches Over Us), often shortened to Marimite (マリみて), is a Japanese light novel series written by Oyuki Konno with illustrations by Reine Hibiki. Originally written as a short story in 1997, Shueisha published 37 light novel volumes from April 1998 to April 2012. The story focuses on a group of teenage girls attending the Catholic Lillian Girls' Academy in Tokyo, Japan. Its storyline largely revolves around the lives and close relationships of the school's student council known as the Yamayuri Council.

A manga adaptation was published by Shueisha in Margaret and its sister magazine The Margaret. Between 2004 and 2009, the series was adapted by Studio Deen into three 13-episode anime television series and a five-episode original video animation (OVA) series. The anime adaptations have been released in North America by Nozomi Entertainment under the title Maria Watches Over Us. The license was later transferred to Maiden Japan. A live-action film adaptation was released in Japan in November 2010. Several audio dramas and music albums were also published.

Maria-sama ga Miteru received generally positive reviews by critics. It has been described as representative of yuri novels, and has been credited with starting "the modern yuri trend," in addition to reviving the Class S genre. Critics have praised the series for its strong characterization, even among peripheral characters, and for its emphasis on romance and emotion over sexuality. The dramatization, however, has been criticized as being overly dramatic at times, but the lack of malicious characters has been described as reducing the chance for more drama. The extensive use of French titles has also been criticized as being distracting and initially difficult to follow. Over 5.4 million copies of the light novels have been published.

== Plot ==
=== Setting and themes ===
The setting for Maria-sama ga Miteru is Lillian Girls' Academy (私立リリアン女学園, Shiritsu Ririan Jogakuen), a fictional Catholic school founded in 1901 in Musashino, Tokyo, Japan; the school is depicted as an elegant, clean, pure, and very prestigious institution. Among the facilities of Lillian, aside from the classrooms, there is a church, a greenhouse, a kendo dojo, an auditorium, a park, and the Rose Mansion, where the Yamayuri Council meet. The students are very respectable and in good standing. The uniform at the school is a long, black Japanese school uniform with a white collar.

The school uses the fictional sœur system where any second- or third-year student, the grande sœur ("big sister"), might pick a younger girl who will become her "sœur" (sister in French). The grande sœur gives her the petite sœur ("little sister") a rosary and promises to look after her and guide her. The basic etiquette demands the petite sœur to call her grande sœur "onee-sama" (older sister in Japanese). Aside from being used in prayer, the rosary is the instrument that certifies the sœur union and relationship between two students. There is an implicit code of behavior between sœurs, especially in the Yamayuri Council—the student council of the school: quietness, measure and respect towards each other; values deeply attached to traditional Japanese education.

French is occasionally used throughout the story; for example, the series is given the French subtitle La Vierge Marie vous regarde, which means "The Virgin Mary is watching you". In keeping with the tone of the series, formal language is used: gokigen'yō (ごきげんよう) is a strictly formal and respectful greeting in Japanese, and is used both to greet and to bid farewell. By custom, this greeting is used often in the Lillian School; this has been one of the distinguishable and popular phrases of the series, and it is used to begin or to finish each volume. The Animax English-language version translates the word as "good day to you".

The Lillian Girls' Academy uses the lily symbolism as the white lily is the flower of the Virgin Mary. The white lily is a Christian symbol of virginity and purity. This lily imagery is also used as a reference to yuri: the story has some elements of romance between female characters; the use of lilies reinforces this in subtext, as do the names of the student council and of the school itself. The series is only explicit about a romantic relationship once in a flashback, but many of the sisters have romantic friendships.

The musical choices of the Maria-sama ga Miteru anime adaptations are generally classical music-inspired. The Christian hymn "Maria-sama no Kokoro" (マリア様のこころ, The Virgin Mary's Heart) is often referred to in the series. In the context of the series, it is a children's song taught to the students at Lillian.

=== Story and characters ===
Maria-sama ga Miteru's story revolves around the students of the Lillian Girls' Academy and is character-driven, focusing on interactions between the characters rather than any sort of ongoing plot or goal to attain. When the story begins, Yumi Fukuzawa, a first-year student at Lillian, is praying in front of the Virgin Mary statue near the school entrance when she is suddenly approached by a cold second-year student named Sachiko Ogasawara who straightens Yumi's uniform neckerchief. This seemingly simple act of kindness stays with Yumi the rest of the day, and she speaks of her meeting with Sachiko to her friends during class and lunch.

After school is over, Yumi's classmate Tsutako Takeshima meets with Yumi to show her that she took a photograph of Yumi's meeting with Sachiko earlier that morning. Yumi asks if she can have the photo, but Tsutako says she will give her the snapshot under two conditions: one being that Tsutako can display it at the upcoming school festival, and two being that Yumi get Sachiko's permission to do so as well. Yumi agrees to this, which sets in motion a series of events involving the entire Yamayuri Council. A few weeks after first meeting Sachiko, Yumi accepts Sachiko's rosary and therefore agrees to become her petite sœur. This officially inducts Yumi into the Yamayuri Council where she assists them in school matters alongside Yoshino Shimazu and Shimako Tōdō—the petite sœurs of Rei Hasekura and Sei Satō, respectively. Through her activities in the Yamayuri Council, Yumi becomes closer to the other members and generally finds her experiences with the group to be enjoyable.

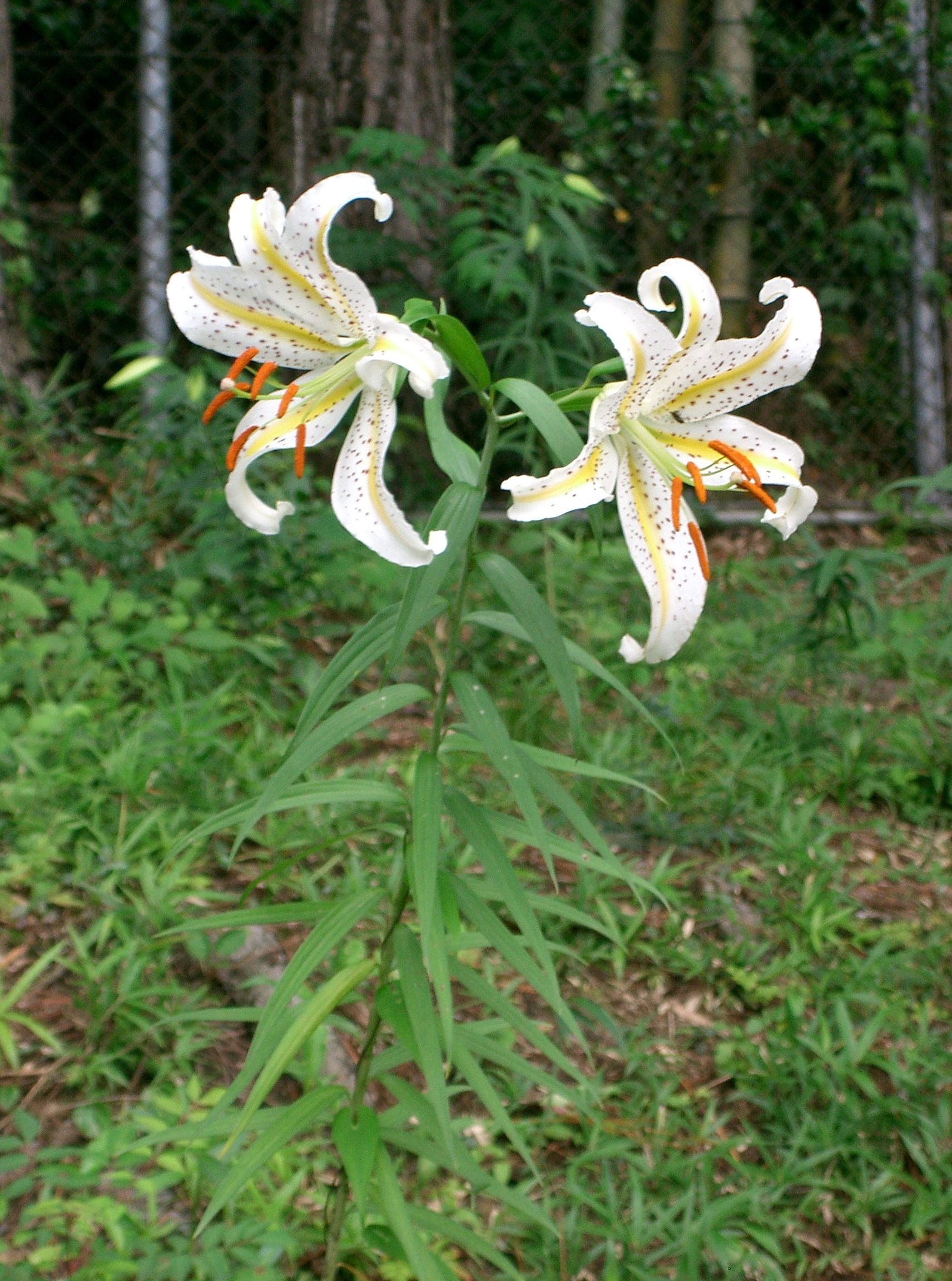
Lilium auratum, translated as the "Mountain Lily" in Maria-sama ga Miteru

==== Yamayuri Council ====
Much of the story of Maria-sama ga Miteru revolves around the Yamayuri Council (山百合会, Yamayurikai; lit. "Mountain Lily Council"), which acts as the student council. The Yamayuri Council meets in a building called the Rose Mansion (薔薇の館, Bara no Yakata). It is located within the school and consists of two stories, including a meeting room on the second. The Yamayuri Council itself consists of three offices, named after roses: Rosa foetida (ロサ・フェティダ, Rosa fetida; Persian yellow rose), Rosa gigantea (ロサ・ギガンティア, Rosa gigantia; Himalayan rose), and Rosa chinensis (ロサ・キネンシス, Rosa kinenshisu; Chinese rose). These are also referred to by their colors; the Yellow Rose (黄薔薇, Kibara) is Rosa foetida, the White Rose (白薔薇, Shirobara) is Rosa gigantea, and the Red Rose (紅薔薇, Benibara) is Rosa chinensis.

Due to the high importance the three Rose families have in the development of the student activities within school, those who become petites sœurs of any of the mentioned families receive a functional "inheritance" through the grandes sœurs teachings, to adopt a position given certain circumstances. In this way, patrons are recognized through the generations of the members of the Rose families. Still, after graduating, the grandes sœurs of the Yamayuri Council may continue with a fair participation in the events concerning their families, as shown in the novels.

A Rose (薔薇, Bara), or Rosa (ロサ), is one of three senior members of the Yamayuri Council. It is also possible to generally speak of all the members of the Yamayuri Council as roses. A Rose makes the critical decisions within this group since she controls the student council. Candidates for the position, which lasts through the school year, are chosen through an election. Any student can run to become a Rose, although the position is usually given to the en boutons, the Roses' petite sœurs.

The petite sœur of a Rosa is called an en bouton (アン・ブゥトン, an būton), otherwise known as a "rosebud" (薔薇のつぼみ, bara no tsubomi). En bouton is French for "in bud"—as used in the example Rosa Chinensis en bouton—and is unofficially considered part of the Yamayuri Council, as is the petite sœur of the en bouton, if she has one. The en boutons must be in a lower year than their Rosa, and generally, the en boutons execute the plans discussed by the Roses like assistants. Although the Rosa positions of the Yamayuri Council are traditionally passed to the en bouton on the graduation of the current holder, they are nonetheless elected offices that anyone may run for.

The petite sœur of the en bouton is called en bouton petite sœur (アン・ブゥトン・プティ・スール, an būton puti sūru)—as used in the example Rosa Chinensis en bouton petite sœur—and is otherwise known as the "younger sister of a rose bud" (薔薇のつぼみの妹, bara no tsubomi no imōto). She must be in a lower year than her en bouton and performs small duties, such as attending to the Roses' en boutons, cleaning the Rose Mansion, and making tea and snacks for the Yamayuri Council. This lasts a school year; the following year, when their en bouton is elected as Rosa, the petite sœurs automatically become en boutons.

== Production ==
After writing her debut novel series Yume no Miya (夢の宮, Palace of Dreams) for three years starting in March 1994, Oyuki Konno published a short story called "Maria-sama ga Miteru" in the February 1997 issue of the shōjo magazine Cobalt with illustrations by Yuma Aoi. In 1993, Konno had previously won both Cobalt's Novel Award and Readers' Award for Yume no Miya, and by February 1997, nine volumes had been released.

According to Konno, the idea for the story emerged in the mid-1990s during the height of the Boys' Love (BL) boom. Konno gathered with writer friends and the group discussed how recent novels and manga intended for girls were dominated by male characters and "boring," lamenting the scarcity of works featuring large casts of female characters. While the group was tossing around ideas, Konno enlivened the conversation by jokingly acting out a scene, saying, "Sister, the Virgin Mary is watching!" ("Onee-sama, Maria-sama ga miteru kara!"). This joke established the basic concept of relationships between girls in different school grades, as well as the title. Her friends subsequently began frequently pressuring her, asking "Aren't you going to write Maria-sama ga Miteru?" Konno eventually obtained the consent of her friends to use the idea and wrote the first novella for the February 1997 issue of Cobalt.

In the afterword of the first Maria-sama ga Miteru light novel volume, Konno admitted that Maria-sama ga Miteru marked a significant departure from her usual storytelling genre in Yume no Miya, which she described as an "imperial court tale" set in a fictionalized classical Japan. For the basis of Lillian Girls' Academy, Konno drew from her own experiences attending an all-girl high school and junior college for five years. She notes that when she took the entrance exam for the combined junior and senior high school, she was shocked to see only girls in the classroom; she projected this experience onto the character Noriko Nijo, who enters the school as a student from the outside rather than moving up from the middle school. Some of the scenery of Lillian was also taken from her school, such as a ginkgo pathway stretching from the main gate. The laid-back atmosphere of the school was also incorporated into Lillian, although Konno's school did not have a sœur system and it was not a Catholic school. However, Konno had been exposed to Christianity from a young age: she attended a strictly Christian kindergarten which had a sanctuary and cloister in the middle of the school. Konno notes that she put her own questions about the Virgin Mary's heart into the story via Yumi. Konno ultimately mixed together various sources and ended up with Lillian Girls' Academy.

When approached to write a continuation of the short story, Konno decided to begin a new serialized narrative set approximately six months prior to the events of the short story. She replaced the protagonist, Noriko, with Yumi Fukuzawa, as she felt the relationship between the "White Rose" pair (Noriko and her senior) had already been completed in the short story. Yumi was designed with twin tails and a completely different direction to differentiate her from Noriko's group. Konno stated that for this work, the characters existed first and the story was developed later, noting, "The characters just started moving on their own one after another." In the afterword of volume 25, she elaborated on this autonomy:

However, this time, [she] moved on [her] own. ... When I finished writing, I went "Ah." ... Well, that is also part of what a novel is. I think that when a character moves, it means that for that girl, it was the most natural action to take. Right, Noriko?

— Oyuki Konno, Maria-sama ga Miteru Volume 25 Afterword

A key point of the series is the sœur (sister) system. When she began writing, Konno initially thought, "It would be nice if this lasted about three volumes." However, as she wrote, the concept expanded naturally; she realized, "It is inevitable that a sister has a sister. Yumi is a first-year student, and Sachiko is a second-year. That implies that Sachiko surely has a sister as well," which led to the expansion of the lineage system.

While the series is often described as a successor to Nobuko Yoshiya's Hana Monogatari (Flower Tales), Konno has explicitly denied this influence. She had not read Hana Monogatari until she began receiving questions about it after Maria-sama ga Miteru was published. Similarly, regarding the concept of "Class S" (Sisterhood), she stated that while she was aware of the word "Yuri," she had absolutely no intention of writing a story in that genre. Instead, Konno stated that the work was created as an antithesis to the Boys' Love genre.

== Media ==
=== Light novels ===
After writing the Maria-sama ga Miteru short story, Konno expanded it into a series of novels. The first volume was published on April 24, 1998, with illustrations by Reine Hibiki. In terms of the storyline, this first novel marks the beginning of the series; the original 1997 short story was reworked and republished in the ninth volume Cherry Blossom in 2001. Shueisha published 37 light novels in the series, ending with Farewell Bouquet on April 28, 2012. There were also two additional volumes published, the first containing an overview of the series and interviews, and the second featuring an illustration collection. Second editions were published starting in 2018 to commemorate its 20th anniversary. In February 2003, with 12 volumes released, Konno began to publish more short stories in Cobalt, with illustrations by Hibiki. Counting the 1997 debut, 27 short stories were published, which were included in later novels. The first five volumes of the light novel series were translated into German by Tokyopop.

Konno also wrote a spin-off series of light novels titled Oshaka-sama mo Miteru (お釈迦様もみてる, Buddha Watches Too), also illustrated by Hibiki. These focus on Yumi's younger brother Yūki and his schoolmates at Hanadera. Shueisha published 10 volumes between August 1, 2008, and November 30, 2013.

=== Manga ===
The first manga volume, illustrated by Satoru Nagasawa

A manga adaptation, drawn by Satoru Nagasawa, was serialized in Shueisha's shōjo manga magazine Margaret between October 2003 and October 2005. Following this, the manga was transferred to Shueisha's sister magazine The Margaret between May 2006 and December 2007. The manga was again serialized in The Margaret between May and August 2010. The individual chapters were collected and published in nine tankōbon volumes released by Shueisha between February 2004 and October 2010. The first eight volumes were republished in five omnibus volumes in Japan between April and July 2010. The story in each volume follows the corresponding volume of the novels. The first eight volumes were translated into German by Tokyopop.

Six brief manga one-shots, illustrated by Reine Hibiki and based on some scenes from the novels, were published by Shueisha in Cobalt between February 2003 and December 2004. They are: "Yumi's Valentine Eve" (祐巳のヴァレンタイン・イブ, Yumi no Varentain Ibu; February 2003), "Before the Festival" (祭りの前, Matsuri no Mae; October 2003), "Christmas Present" (クリスマス・プレゼント, Kurisumasu Purezento; December 2003), "By Graduation..." (卒業までに…, Sotsugyō Made ni...; February 2004), "All Alone on Sunday" (ひとりの日曜日, Hitori no Nichiyōbi; April 2004), and "The Beginning of the Year" (年の始めの, Toshi no Hajime no; December 2004). "Before the Festival" was later included in volume 18 of the novels, Premium Book, and the other five were later published in volume 26 of the novels, Illustration Collection. A one-shot of Oshaka-sama mo Miteru, illustrated by Sakura Kenjō, was published in Shueisha's Comic Cobalt magazine in August 2010.

=== Anime ===
A 13-episode anime television series adaptation of Maria-sama ga Miteru aired in Japan between January 7 and March 31, 2004, on TV Tokyo. Produced by Studio Deen and directed by Yukihiro Matsushita, the screenplay was written by Reiko Yoshida, and Akira Matsushima based the character design used in the anime on Reine Hibiki's original designs. The art director for the series is Nobuto Sakamoto. The sound director is Yoshikazu Iwanami, and the soundtrack is composed by Mikiya Katakura. The series was later released by Geneon to seven VHS and DVD compilation volumes from April to October 2004.

Most of the production staff would return to produce two additional television series and an original video animation (OVA) series. The 13-episode second season, titled Maria-sama ga Miteru: Printemps (マリア様がみてる〜春〜, Maria-sama ga Miteru ~Haru~), aired between July 4 and September 26, 2004, on TV Tokyo. The series was later released by Geneon to six VHS and DVD compilation volumes from October 2004 to April 2005. The third season, a five-episode OVA series titled Maria-sama ga Miteru, was released on DVD from November 29, 2006, to July 25, 2007; each episode is approximately 50 minutes long. The 13-episode fourth season, again titled Maria-sama ga Miteru, aired between January 3 and March 28, 2009, on AT-X. The series was released by Geneon to six DVD compilation volumes from March to August 2009. Instead of Yukihiro Matsushita who had directed the first three seasons, the fourth season is directed by Toshiyuki Katō.

In addition to the main anime series, a parody series called Maria-sama ni wa Naisho (マリア様にはないしょ, Keep it Secret from the Virgin Mary) is included as a bonus on the DVD releases of the three televisions seasons and the OVA series. There are 29 episodes: seven from season one, six for season two, five for season three, and eleven for season four. The episodes consist of short segments of fake outtakes and parody skits drawn in a super deformed style and starring the cast of the anime.

Nozomi Entertainment, the licensing branch of Right Stuf Inc., had licensed the three television series and the OVA series under the title Maria Watches Over Us for North American distribution. The four series were released as DVD box sets with English subtitles as follows: July 29, 2008 for season one, November 25, 2008 for season two, March 24, 2009 for season three, and July 6, 2010, for season four. Maiden Japan licensed the three television series and the OVA series after Nozomi Entertainment's license to the franchise had expired. An English dub for the series was considered in 2018.

=== Audio CDs ===
For the first Maria-sama ga Miteru anime series, the opening theme "Pastel Pure" and the ending theme is "Sonata Blue". Both songs are instrumental tracks composed by Mikiya Katakura of the band Ali Project and were released on a theme song album in February 2004. The original soundtrack for the first anime series was released in February 2004. For Maria-sama ga Miteru: Printemps, the opening theme is a vocal version of "Pastel Pure" by Ali Project and the ending theme is again "Sonata Blue". The single for "Pastel Pure" was released in August 2004. The original soundtrack for Printemps was released in September 2004.

For the Maria-sama ga Miteru OVA series, the opening theme is again the instrumental version of "Pastel Pure", and there are two ending themes. The single for the first ending theme "Chercher" (シャルシェ) by Kotoko was released in October 2006, and the single for the second ending theme "Kirei na Senritsu" (きれいな旋律) by Kotoko was released in March 2007. The original soundtrack for the OVA series was released in March 2007. For the Maria-sama ga Miteru fourth season, the single for the opening theme "Chizu Sanpo" (地図散歩) by Kukui was released in February 2009, and the single for the ending theme "Kumori Garasu no Mukō" (くもりガラスの向こう) by Kaori Hikita was also released in February 2009. For the Maria-sama ga Miteru live-action film, the theme song "Heavenly Days" by CooRie was released on her album Heavenly Days in October 2010.

Three volumes of albums titled Maria-sama ga Miteru: Haru Image Album containing image songs and background music tracks were released between April and September 2005. Each image album was assigned to one of the three families of roses; the songs were sung by the voice actors of the anime series. A vocal album titled Christmas Album was released in December 2008. Shueisha produced 12 drama CDs between January 14, 2004, and December 14, 2007, and Frontier Works produced three additional drama CDs between July 24, 2009, and July 22, 2010; the CDs use the same voice actors from the anime series. The drama CDs are based on the stories in the novels. The fifth and tenth drama CDs by Shueisha were released in limited edition versions each with a slipcase and a pair of character mini-figures.

=== Internet radio show ===
An Internet radio show to promote Maria-sama ga Miteru called Web Radio Maria-sama ga Miteru (Webラジオ マリア様がみてる) was hosted by Kana Ueda, the voice of Yumi Fukuzawa, and featured other voice actors from the anime series as guests. The show features conversations and publicity, often commenting with news of the anime series and other funny situations from the plot of the novels. It had a pre-broadcast special for Christmas on December 22, 2005, and later broadcast 19 episodes between March 9 and November 24, 2006. The show was streamed online every other Thursday, and was produced by Animate TV. Three additional broadcasts followed: a New Year's Day special on January 25, 2007, a Hinamatsuri special on March 1, 2007, and another Christmas special on December 20, 2007.

The radio show returned to broadcast 13 main episodes and 3 specials between August 27, 2008, and September 30, 2009. Again hosted by Ueda, the show was streamed online every last Wednesday of the month, and was also produced by Animate TV. Combined, the two radio show seasons were later released on 13 CD compilation volumes by Frontier Works between August 4, 2006, and February 24, 2010.

Radio broadcasts
Season one
#	Title	Date	Guests
01	"Full with the Red Roses, Say Good Day" (紅薔薇づくしでごきげんよう, Benibara Zukushi de Gokigen'yō)	March 9, 2006	Miki Itō (Sachiko Ogasawara) Emi Shinohara (Yōko Mizuno)
02	"Still Not Accustomed to Say, Good Day" (まだ言いなれていないごきげんよう, Mada Iinarete Inai Gokigen'yō)	March 23, 2006	Kaori Shimizu (Noriko Nijō)
03	"On a Public Recording, Say Good Day" (公開録音でごきげんよう, Kōkai Rokuon de Gokigen'yō)	April 6, 2006	Kaori Shimizu (Noriko Nijō), Miki Itō (Sachiko Ogasawara), Haruna Ikezawa (Yoshino Shimazu) & Mamiko Noto (Shimako Tōdō)
04	"It is a Good Day, Madam" (ごきげんようですわ奥様, Gokigen'yō Desuwa Okusama)	April 20, 2006	Rina Satō (Tsutako Takeshima)
05	"With Mimicking, Say Good Day" (モノマネでごきげんよう, Monomane de Gokigen'yō)	May 11, 2006	Miki Itō (Sachiko Ogasawara)
06	"With Roll Cake, Say Good Day" (ロールケーキでごきげんよう, Rōru Kēki de Gokigen'yō)	May 25, 2006	Haruna Ikezawa (Yoshino Shimazu)
07	"On the Tea Party, Say Good Day" (お茶会でごきげんよう, Ochakai de Gokigen'yō)	June 8, 2006	Haruna Ikezawa (Yoshino Shimazu) & Mamiko Noto (Shimako Tōdō)
08	"Even with Rainy Blue, Say Good Day" (レイ二ーブルーでもごきげんよう, Reinī Burū demo Gokigen'yō)	June 22, 2006	Emi Shinohara (Yōko Mizuno)
09	"From Yumi's Room, Say Good Day" (祐巳の部屋からごきげんよう, Yumi no Heya Kara Gokigen'yō)	July 6, 2006	
10	"From a Daytime, We Are Drunk and Say Good Day" (昼間っから酔っ払ってごきげんよう, Hirumakkara Yopparatte Gokigen'yō)	July 20, 2006	Shizuka Itō (Rei Hasekura)
11	"Shimako Watches...the 'Good Day's of Ladies" (志摩子はみてる…奥様たちの「ごきげんよう」を, Shimako wa Miteru...Okusama-tachi no 'Gokigen'yō' o)	August 3, 2006	Mamiko Noto (Shimako Tōdō)
12	"Shimako is Mine! With Jealousy, Say Good Day" (志摩子は私のだ!ジェラスィーでごきげんよう, Shimako wa Watashi no da! Jerasī de Gokigen'yō)	August 17, 2006	Megumi Toyoguchi (Sei Satō)
13	"Not So Bad, Say Good Day" (ボチボチでごきげんよう, Bochi-bochi de Gokigen'yō)	August 31, 2006	Hitomi Nabatame (Eriko Torii)
14	"On a School Excursion, Say Good Day" (修学旅行でごきげんよう, Shūgaku Ryokō de Gokigen'yō)	September 14, 2006	Kaori Shimizu (Noriko Nijō)
15	"Good Day of 500 Push-Ups" (腕立てふせ500回のごきげんよう, Udetate-fuse Gohyakkai no Gokigen'yō)	September 28, 2006	Rie Kugimiya (Tōko Matsudaira)
16	"Second Grade Trio Say Good Day" (2年生トリオでごきげんよう, Ni-nen-sei Torio de Gokigen'yō)	October 12, 2006	Haruna Ikezawa (Yoshino Shimazu) & Mamiko Noto (Shimako Tōdō)
17	"Alcohol, Fishing, Jealousy, and Good Day" (酒、釣り、嫉妬、ごきげんよう, Sake, Tsuri, Shitto, Gokigen'yō)	October 26, 2006	Shizuka Itō (Rei Hasekura)
18	"Crazy About Cakes, Say Good Day" (おやつに夢中でごぎげんよう, Oyatsu ni Muchū de Gokigen'yō)	November 9, 2006	Miki Itō (Sachiko Ogasawara)
19	"Have a Good Day Till We Meet Again" (また会う日までごきげんよう, Mata Au Hi Made Gokigen'yō)	November 24, 2006	
SP 1	"New Year Special, Say Good Day" (新春スペシャルで、ごきげんよう, Shinshun Special de Gokigen'yō)	January 25, 2007	Kaori Shimizu (Noriko Nijō) & Mamiko Noto (Shimako Tōdō)
SP 2	"Doll Festival Special, Say Good Day" (ひな祭りスペシャルで、ごきげんよう, Hinamatsuri Special de Gokigen'yō)	March 1, 2007	Mamiko Noto (Shimako Tōdō) & Haruna Ikezawa (Yoshino Shimazu)
SP 3	"Christmas Special 2007: Good Day with a Revival on Christmas Eve" (クリスマススペシャル2007 『聖夜の復活で、ごきげんよう』, Kurisumasu Supesharu 2007: Seiya no Fukkatsu de, Gokigen'yō)	December 20, 2007	
Season two
#	Title	Date	Guests
01	"It's Been a Long Time, and Good Day" (お久しぶりに、ごきげんよう, Ohisashiburi ni, Gokigen'yō)	August 27, 2008	Ami Koshimizu (Kanako Hosokawa)
SP 1	"Special Just Before the Autumn Lillian Festival" (秋のリリアン祭直前スペシャル, Aki no Lilian-sai Chokuzen Special)	September 10, 2008	
02	"Good Job at the Lillian Festival, and Good Day" (リリアン祭お疲れ様でしたごきげんよう, Lilian-sai Otsukaresama deshita Gokigen'yō)	September 24, 2008	Marina Inoue (Shouko Naitou)
03	"Good Day with a Double Role" (一人二役でごきげんよう, Hitorifutayaku de Gokigen'yō)	October 29, 2008	Hitomi Nabatame (Nana Arima)
04	"Good Day with a Christmas Song" (クリスマスソングでごきげんよう, Kurisumasu Songu de Gokigen'yō)	November 26, 2008	Kaori Shimizu (Noriko Nijou)
SP 2	"Merry Christmas! Good Day!" (メリークリスマス!ごきげんよう!, Merī Kurisumasu! Gokigen'yō)	December 24, 2008	Mamiko Noto and Haruna Ikezawa
SP 3	"Happy New Year! Good Day!" (明けましておめでとうございます!ごきげんよう!, Akemashite Omedetō Gozaimasu! Gokigen'yō)	January 7, 2009	Shizuka Itō
05	"The Yamayuri Council is Eternal...Good Day" (山百合会よ永遠に…ごきげんよう, Yamayurikai yo Eien ni...Gokigen'yō)	January 28, 2009	
06	"You'll Get Used to it Eventually! Good Day!" (そのうち慣れる!ごきげんよう!, Sonouchi Nareru! Gokigen'yō!)	February 25, 2009	
07	"It's Spring! Good Day!" (春ですね! ごきげんよう!, Haru desu ne! Gokigen'yō!)	March 25, 2009	
08	"Good Day with All Kinds of Pink!" (ピンクづくしでごきげんよう, Pinkzukushi de Gokigen'yō!)	April 29, 2009	
09	"Let's Get Along, and Good Day" (仲良く行きましょう、ごきげんよう, Nakayoku Ikimashō, Gokigen'yō)	May 27, 2009	
10	"Happy Birthday! Good Day!" (お誕生日おめでとう! ごきげんよう!, Otanjōbi Omedetō! Gokigen'yō!)	June 24, 2009	
11	"Good Day with Just the Two of Us" (2人きりでごきげんよう, Futarikiri de Gokigen'yō)	July 29, 2009	
12	"Good Day During Summer Vacation" (夏休みにごきげんよう, Natsuyasumi ni Gokigen'yō)	August 26, 2009	
13	"Be Careful of Injuries and Good Day" (ケガに気をつけてごきげんよう, Kega ni Ki o Tsukete Gokigen'yō)	September 30, 2009	

=== Live-action film ===
A live-action film adaptation premiered in Japanese theaters on November 6, 2010. The film is directed by Kōtarō Terauchi, and Terauchi co-wrote the script with Keiji Sagami. The film's music is composed by Chika Fujino. The film was released on Blu-ray Disc and DVD in Japan on July 29, 2011. To tie in with the film, a new edition of the first light novel was published in June 2010 with a cover featuring stars Honoka Miki and Haru.

== Reception ==
It was reported in April 2010 that 5.4 million copies of the original light novels have been published. Reception to the Maria-sama ga Miteru anime series has been generally positive, although Anime News Network (ANN) noted that the series leaves itself "wide open to cynical sniggering." Carlos Ross from Them Anime regarded it as "one of the most beautiful and graceful anime" series, adding that the animation is sometimes of questionable quality but overall "very appealing". Andrew Shelton from AMR found the series to be "fairly unique" compared to other shōjo works, explaining that although the story is "a little basic" and "overly dramatic", what is most important is the "response and actions of the character on who the story is focused." Stig Høgset, also from Them Anime, commented that the third season was criticized for being too short, but he personally did not feel "like it was lacking something." Jason Thompson credits Maria-sama ga Miteru with starting "the modern yuri trend." Newer anime titles that Maria-sama ga Miteru is compared to include Otome wa Boku ni Koishiteru, Strawberry Panic!, Best Student Council, and Aria. Carlos Ross, writing about the first novel in the series, felt the story was a "classic rags-to-riches tale," but that it was "also sweet, touching and witty when it needs to be." He criticized the lack of teachers and schoolwork in the series, which led to the plot being filled with extracurricular activities, which are common to high school series. He also criticized Yumi's low self-esteem.

A characteristic element of the series is the extensive use of French titles, which Carlos Ross has criticized as "distracting". Mania.com criticized the early anime episodes as being "difficult", and saying that the first episode "throws a lot of terms and names at you". On the other hand, Ross compared the "atmosphere" presented by the series' artwork with those from other anime titles of similar setting, including the bright and vivid Revolutionary Girl Utena. Another reviewer from Them Anime also compared Maria-sama ga Miteru with Oniisama e..., but noted that the former is much less dramatic. Marc Hairston commented on the unusual character designs compared to other series, and said they are "ordinary students." ANN also noted the "clear, expressive eyes and character designs that are gifted with an understated mobility," praising the casting choices, and noting that even "peripheral" characters are "fully realized." Holly Ellingwood of Active Anime described the relationships between the characters as "intensely platonic" and "pseudo-gay" for the most part.

ANN noted that the second anime season tends to overdramatize, especially in the last three episodes. ANN also describes the second season as "more embarrassing and shoujo-ai oriented" than the first season, but that the solid characterization is still a strength of the series. Holly Ellingwood of Active Anime appreciated the focus on characters other than Yumi and Sachiko for the second season, regarding Shimako's loss of Sei and befriending Noriko as being "one of the more moving" arcs of Printemps. ANN regarded the OVA season as the best of the first three seasons, citing the improved production standards and the less melodramatic storylines. ANN notes that the fourth season is "a return to dramatic form" after the relaxation of the OVA series, but it is not as melodramatic as the second season, due to the increased maturity of the cast. Chris Beveridge, writing for Mania.com, found it odd that Yumi and Sachiko did not spend so much time together in the fourth season, and felt that the series needed an epilogue, but enjoyed seeing Yumi taking on some "adult responsibilities."

Andrew Shelton has suggested that Maria-sama ga Miteru's "reduced capacity for epic drama" is due to the lack of malicious characters; he considers the series "pure shōjo", mostly due to its character-driven storyline. Japanese reviewers for their part regard the story as a revival of the Class S genre, and specifically a modern-day equivalent of Nobuko Yoshiya's Hana Monogatari. Hairston notes that Maria-sama ga Miteru emphasizes romance and emotion over sexuality, and it has a respectful treatment of its homoerotic themes. He describes the series as "one of the most interesting and touching anime series of the last two years", adding that it is "about self-discovery and self-acceptance."

A Pizza Hut tie-in campaign for the fourth anime series started on January 7, 2008. The Rose Mansion from the story was recreated in the Second Life virtual world and opened on February 8, 2008.
