= Shueisha =

Japanese publishing company

Shueisha Inc.

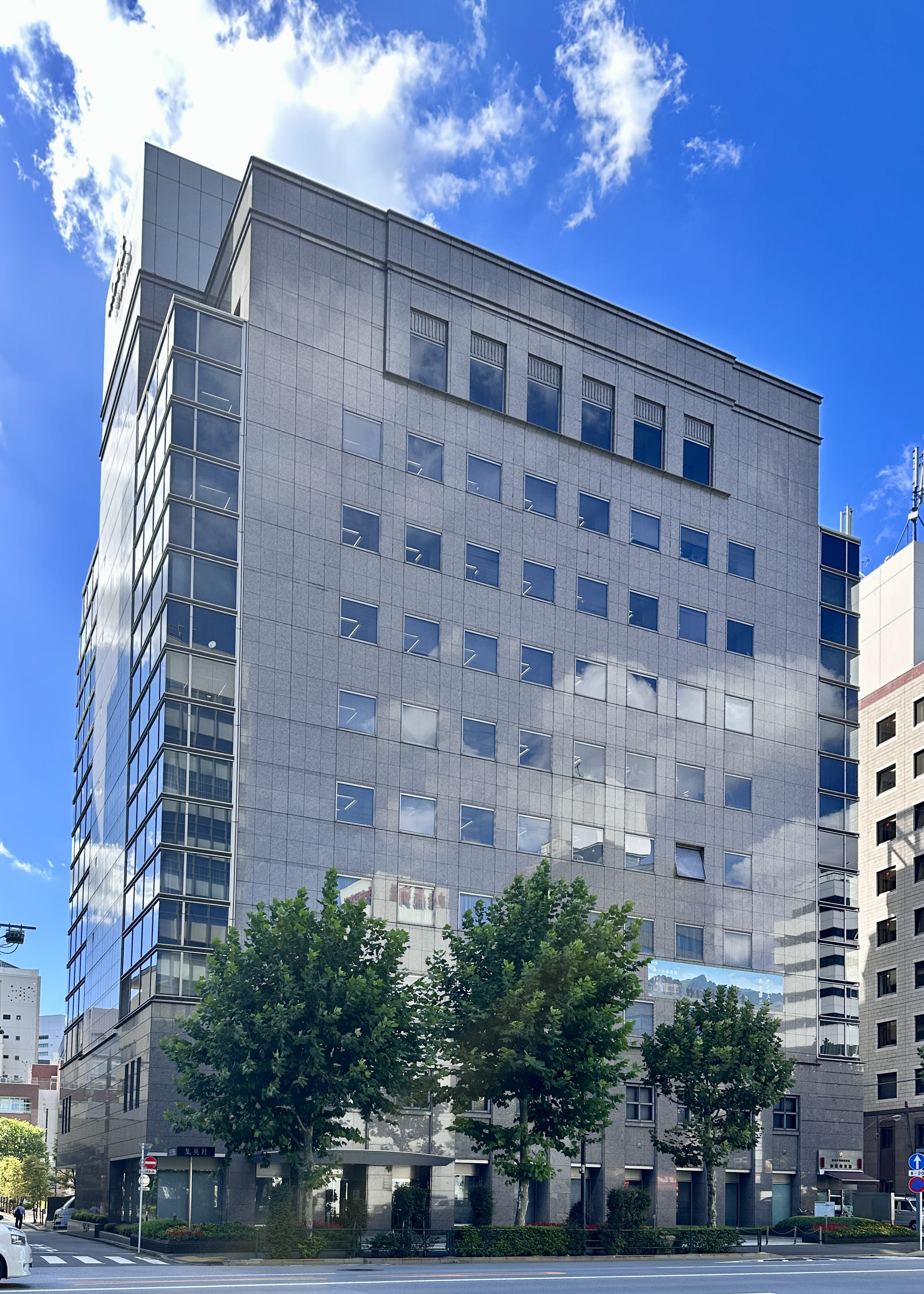
- Headquarters in Chiyoda, Tokyo, Japan
- Native name: 株式会社集英社
- Romanized name: Kabushiki gaisha Shūeisha
- Type: Private KK
- Industry: Publishing
- Founded: August 8, 1926; 100 years ago
- Founder: Takeo Ōga
- Headquarters: Hitotsubashi, Chiyoda, Tokyo, Japan
- Area served: Worldwide
- Key people: Shinichi Hirono (President and CEO)
- Products: Magazines, manga, picture books, light novels, educational books, reference books, and other books
- Operating income: ¥28.97 billion (2014)
- Net income: ¥37.56 billion (2016)
- Owner: Hitotsubashi Group (Ōga family)
- Number of employees: 780 (2025)
- Subsidiaries: Homesha; Shueisha Services; Chiyoda Studio; Shueisha Creative; Shueisha International; Hitotsubashi Planning; Shueisha Business; Project8; Viz Media; Shueisha Games; Remow
- Website: www.shueisha.co.jp/en/

Shueisha Inc. (Japanese: 株式会社集英社, Hepburn: Kabushiki gaisha Shūei-sha) is a Japanese publishing company headquartered in Chiyoda, Tokyo, Japan. Shueisha is the largest publishing company in Japan. It was established in 1925 as the entertainment-related publishing division of Japanese publisher Shogakukan. The following year, Shueisha became a separate, independent company.

Manga magazines published by Shueisha include the Jump magazine line, which includes shonen magazines Weekly Shōnen Jump, Jump SQ, and V Jump, and seinen magazines Weekly Young Jump, Grand Jump and Ultra Jump, and the online magazine Shōnen Jump+. They also publish other magazines, including Non-no. Shueisha, along with Shogakukan, owns Viz Media, which publishes manga from both companies in North America.

== History ==
In 1925, Shueisha was created by major publishing company Shogakukan (founded in 1922). Jinjō Shōgaku Ichinen Josei (尋常小學一年女生) became the first novel published by Shueisha in collaboration with Shogakukan—the temporary home of Shueisha. In 1927, two novels titled Danshi Ehon, and Joshi Ehon were created. In 1928, Shueisha was hired to edit Gendai Humor Zenshū (現代ユーモア全集, Gendai Yūmoa Zenshū), a compilation. Gendai Humor Zenshū continued 12 volumes, some issues being Joshi Shinjidai Eishūji-chō and Shinjidai Eishūji-chō (新時代英習字帳). In the 1930s another novel called Tantei-ki Dan was launched and Gendai Humor Zenshū was completed in 24 volumes. In 1931 two more novels were launched, Danshi Yōchien and Joshi Yōchien. After World War II, Shueisha started publishing a manga line called Omoshiro Book. Omoshiro Book published a picture book called Shōnen Ōja, which became a huge hit among boys and girls. The first full volume of Shōnen Ōja was released as Shōnen Ōja Oitachi Hen, which became an instant best-seller.

The first magazine published by Shueisha was Akaruku Tanoshii Shōnen-Shōjo Zasshi. In September 1949, Omoshiro Book was made into a magazine with all the contents of the former line. In 1950, a special edition of the magazine was published under the title Hinomaru. In addition to Omoshiro Book, a female version was published in 1951: Shōjo Book which featured manga aimed at adolescent girls. The Hitotsubashi building of Shueisha became completely independent in 1952. In that year, Omoshiro Book ceased publication and Myōjō began publication as a monthly magazine. The series of Omoshiro Book were published in bunkoban editions under the Omoshiro Manga Bunko line. A novel called Yoiko Yōchien was published and Omoshiro Book was replaced with another children's manga magazine called Yōnen Book.

In 1955, the success of Shōjo Book led to the publication of currently running Ribon. The novel Joshi Yōchien Kobato began publication in 1958. On November 23, a special issue of Myōjō titled Weekly Myōjō was released. In 1951, another male edition of Shōjo Book was released, Shōnen Book was made, and Shōjo Book series were released in bunkoban editions under the Shōjo Manga Bunko imprint. In the 1960s, another spin-off issue of Myōjō was released called Bessatsu Weekly Myōjō. Shueisha continues to publish many novels. A compilation of many Omoshiro Book series was released as Shōnen-Shōjo Nippon Rekishi Zenshū complete in 12 volumes. Many other books were published including Hirosuke Yōnen Dōwa Bungaku Zenshū, Hatachi no Sekkei, Dōdō Taru Jinsei, Shinjin Nama Gekijō, and Gaikoku kara Kita Shingo Jiten. In 1962, Shueisha published a female version of Myōjō titled Josei Myōjō and many more novels.

In 1963, Shueisha began publication of the widely successful Margaret with the additional offshoot Bessatsu Margaret. The novel Ukiyo-e Hanga was released complete in seven volumes, and the picture book Sekai 100 Nin no Monogatari Zenshū was released in the usual 12. In 1964, Kanshi Taikei was released in 24 volumes plus a reprint. In that year a line of novels, Compact Books, was made and a line of manga called Televi-Books ("televi": short for "television"). In 1965, two more magazines were made: Cobalt and the Shōnen Book offshoot Bessatsu Shōnen Book. In 1966, Shueisha began publication of Weekly Playboy, Seishun to Dokusho and Shōsetsu Junior. A novel called Nihonbon Gaku Zenshū spawned a great 88 volumes. Another manga magazine was made titled Young Music. Deluxe Margaret began publication in 1967 and the additional Margaret Comics and Ribon Comics lines. In 1968 the magazine Hoshi Young Sense began publication as spin-off to the short-lived Young Sense. Later in that year Margaret launched the Seventeen magazine as a Japanese version of the English edition.

Shōnen Jump was created in the same year as a semi-weekly magazine. Another children's manga magazine was created in that year called Junior Comic and another Ribon spin-off called Ribon Comic. In 1969, the magazine Joker began publication along with guts. Several other novels were published. The magazine Bessatsu Seventeen began publication. In that year Shōnen Jump became a weekly anthology and changed its name to Weekly Shōnen Jump. Following up the end of Shōnen Book a spin-off of Weekly Shōnen Jump started at the same time as it became weekly, initially called Bessatsu Shōnen Jump. It changed its name to Monthly Shōnen Jump with the second issue.

The 1970s started with the launch of the novel magazine Subaru and in 1971 the Non-no and Ocean life magazines began publication. The novel series Gendai Nippon Bijutsu Zenshū spawned 18 volumes and became a huge seller. In 1972 Roadshow began publication and The Rose of Versailles begins in the Margaret Comics line gaining massive popularity. In 1973 Playgirl magazine began publication and the novel series Zenshaku Kanbun Taikei spawning a huge 33 volumes. In 1974 Weekly Shōnen Jump launched Akamaru Jump. Saison de Non-no launches.

Shueisha announced that in the summer of 2011, it would launch a new manga magazine titled Miracle Jump. In October 2016, Shueisha announced that it had created a new department on June 21 called the Dragon Ball Room (ドラゴンボール室, Doragon Bōru Shitsu). Headed by V Jump editor-in-chief Akio Iyoku, it is dedicated solely to Akira Toriyama's Dragon Ball and optimizing and expanding the brand. On January 28, 2019, Shueisha launched the global English-language version of the online magazine Shōnen Jump+, titled Manga Plus. It is freely available in every country except China and South Korea, which have their own separate services. A Spanish-language version will be launched in February/March 2019, and may have a different library of content. Like the Japanese app, it has large samples of manga that can be read for free including all the current titles of Weekly Shōnen Jump, a sizeable number of titles from Shōnen Jump+ and some titles from Jump Square. However, unlike the Japanese version; the latest chapters of current Weekly Shōnen Jump manga are made available free for a limited-time and it does not sell content. On March 31, 2022, Shueisha announced that it established a new wholly owned affiliated subsidiary named Shueisha Games on February 16. The company will support other developers on over five ongoing projects, and to develop a mobile game with character design by a Weekly Shōnen Jump artist. On May 30, 2023, a vertical manga service called Jump Toon was announced and launched on May 29, 2024.

== Magazines ==
=== Jump magazine line ===
==== Shōnen manga magazines ====
Magazine	Status	Start date
Weekly Shōnen Jump (週刊少年ジャンプ)	Active	1968
Jump SQ. (ジャンプSQ.)	Active	2007
Saikyō Jump (最強ジャンプ)	Active	2010
V Jump (Vジャンプ)	Active	1993
Jump Giga (ジャンプGIGA)	Active	2016
Bessatsu Shōnen Jump (別冊少年ジャンプ)	Defunct	1969
Monthly Shōnen Jump (月刊少年ジャンプ)	Defunct	1974
Fresh Jump (フレッシュジャンプ)	Defunct	1982
Akamaru Jump (赤マルジャンプ)	Defunct	1996
Shōnen Jump Next (少年ジャンプNEXT!)	Defunct	2010

==== Seinen manga magazines ====
Magazine	Status	Start date
Weekly Young Jump (週刊ヤングジャンプ)	Active	1979
Ultra Jump (ウルトラジャンプ)	Active	1999
Grand Jump (グランドジャンプ)	Active	2011
Grand Jump Mecha (グランドジャンプめちゃ)	Active	2017
Grand Jump Mucha (グランドジャンプむちゃ)	Active	2018
Hobby's Jump (ホビーズジャンプ)	Defunct	1983
Business Jump (ビジネスジャンプ)	Defunct	1985
Super Jump (スーパージャンプ)	Defunct	1986
Oh Super Jump (オースーパージャンプ)	Defunct	1996
Monthly Young Jump (月刊ヤングジャンプ)	Defunct	2008
Jump X [Kai] (ジャンプ改)	Defunct	2011
Grand Jump Premium (グランドジャンプPREMIUM)	Defunct	2011
Miracle Jump (ミラクルジャンプ)	Defunct	2013

=== Shōjo manga magazines ===
Magazine	Status	Start date
Ribon (りぼん)	Active	1955
Margaret (マーガレット)	Active	1963
Bessatsu Margaret (別冊マーガレット)	Active	1964
Cookie (クッキー)	Active	1999
Cobalt (COBALT)	Active	1976
Shōjo Book (少女ブック)	Defunct	1951
The Margaret (ザ マーガレット)	Defunct	1982
Bouquet (ぶ～け)	Defunct	1978
Ribon Original (りぼんオリジナル)	Defunct	1981

=== Josei manga magazines ===
Magazine	Status	Start date
Cookie (クッキー)	Active	1999
Cocohana (ココハナ)	Active	1994
office YOU (オフィスユー)	Active	1985
Young You (ヤングユー)	Defunct	1986
You (ユー)	Defunct	1982

=== Other magazines ===
Magazine	Status	Medium
Myōjō (明星)	Active	Popular culture and music
Weekly Playboy (週刊プレイボーイ)	Active	Men's and Seinen manga
Seishun to Dokusho (青春と読書)	Active	Graphics and art
Subaru (すばる)	Active	
Non-no (ノン－ノ)	Active	Women's fashion
Roadshow (ロードショー)	Active	
More (MORE)	Active	Women's magazine
Cosmopolitan (コスモポリタン)	Active	
Non-no More Books (non・no MORE BOOKS)	Active	
Lee (リー)	Active	Women's magazine
Men's Non-no (メンズノンノ)	Active	Men's magazine
Spur (SPUR)	Active	Women's magazine
Shōsetsu Subaru (小説すばる)	Active	
Shueisha Shinsho (集英社新書)	Active	
Baila (BAILA)	Active	Women's magazine
Sportiva (スポルティーバ)	Active	
Maquia (MAQUIA)	Active	Women's magazine
Pinky (PINKY)	Active	
Uomo (UOMO)	Active	Men's magazine
Omoshiro Book (おもしろブック)	Defunct	Shōnen manga
Hinomaru (よいこのとも)	Defunct	
Yōnen Book (幼年ブック)	Defunct	Children/Shōnen manga
Weekly Myōjō (週刊明星)	Defunct	Popular culture and music
Shōnen Book (少年ブック)	Defunct	Shōnen manga
Bessatsu Myōjō (別冊週刊明星)	Defunct	Popular culture and music
Josei Myōjō (女性明星)	Defunct	Women's fashion
Bessatsu Shōnen Book (別冊少年ブック)	Defunct	Shōnen manga
Shōsetsu Junai (小説ジュニア)	Defunct	Novels
Nihonban Gaku Zenshū (日本文学全集)	Defunct	
Young Music (ヤングミュージック)	Defunct	Music
Deluxe Margaret (デラックス マーガレット)	Defunct	
Bessatsu Young Sense (明星ヤングセンス)	Defunct	
Weekly Seventeen (週刊セブンティーン)	Defunct	
Joker (ジョーカー)	Defunct	
Guts (guts)	Defunct	
Ocean life (オーシャンライフ)	Defunct	
Monthly Seventeen (月刊セブンティーン)	Defunct	Women's fashion
Play Girl (プレイガール)	Defunct	
Saison de Non-no (SAISON de non・no)	Defunct	
Weekly Margaret (週刊マーガレット)	Defunct	
Playboy (プレイボーイ)'	Defunct	Men's magazine
Bessatsu Hair Catalog (明星ヘアカタログ)	Defunct	
Sumuappu (サムアップ)	Defunct	
Dunk (DUNK)	Defunct	Men's magazine
Jōhō Chishiki Imidas (情報・知識 imidas)	Defunct	
Monthly Bears Club (月刊ベアーズクラブ)	Defunct	Seinen manga magazine
Monthly Tiara (月刊ティアラ)	Defunct	
Bart (magazine) (バート)	Defunct	Men's magazine
Tanto (TANTO)	Defunct	
All Natural (モア・ナチュラル)	Defunct	
Manga Allman (マンガ・オールマン)	Defunct	Seinen manga magazine
Tepee (Tepee)	Defunct	
Telekids (テレキッズ)	Defunct	
Maple (メイプル)	Defunct	
Yomu Ningen Dock Kenkō Hyakka (読む人間ドック 健康百科)	Defunct	

=== Apps and websites ===
Name	Status	Start date
Dash x Comic (ダッシュエックスコミック)	Active	2017
Manga Mee (マンガMee)	Active	2018
Shōnen Jump+ (少年ジャンプ＋)	Active	2014
Tonari no Young Jump (となりのヤングジャンプ)	Active	2012
YanJan! (ヤンジャン!)	Active	2018
Manga Plus	Active	2019
Jump Toon	Active	2024
Rimacomi+	Active	2024
Manga Million	Active	2026

== Kanzenban magazines ==
Shueisha has published many kanzenban magazines. Kanzenban magazines consist of one series being published for roughly a year and then another and so on, unlike normal manga magazines which have a variety of series. The select series has chapters from roughly three volumes in every issue.

=== Monthly Comic Tokumori ===
Monthly Comic Tokumori (月刊コミック特盛, Gekkan Kommiku Tokumori) is a seinen kanzenban magazine published by Shueisha's subsidiary Home-sha. The magazine currently serializes the samurai-based Nobunaga no Kyodai Tetsu Fune: Sengoku no Umi o Seisu every month.

=== Shueisha Original ===
Shueisha Original (集英社オリジナル, Shūeisha Orijinaru) is a multi-demographic manga magazine published by Shueisha. It features an individual kanzenban of a classic Shueisha manga series. Each issue is a continuation of the last kanzenban. Shueisha Original has only featured two series which have run in the magazine for a long time. The first series was Chibi Maruko-chan from the shōjo manga anthology Ribon. Chibi Maruko-chan ran in the magazine from August 2007 to January 2008. Rokudenashi Blues by Masanori Morita which ran in Weekly Shōnen Jump started in March 2008 and is currently running in Shueisha Original.

=== Shueisha Remix ===
Shueisha Remix (集英社リミックス, Shūeisha Rimikkusu) is one of many kanzenban magazines published by Shueisha. Shueisha Remix magazines are split into four lines: Shueisha Jump Remix, Shueisha Girls Remix, Shueisha Home Remix and Shueisha International Remix.

== Light novel imprints ==
- Cobalt Bunko - Shueisha's light novel imprint that's aimed at teenage girls.
- Chiffon Bunko - A imprint focused on romance series.
- Dash X Bunko - An imprint that targets males from their mid teens to their twenties. It publishes original light novels that contains various genres of: fantasy, science fiction, mystery, romance, history, horror. Published light novel works will have various adaptations, such as manga adaptations in Shueisha's Jump manga magazines, anime adaptations, deployment of mediamix works/projects, and movie adaptations.
- Dash X Bunko Novel f - An imprint that is an off-shoot of Dash X Bunko that targets female audiences.
- Jump J-Books - An imprint that targets males in their teens, and have novelizations and spin-offs of manga from Weekly Shonen Jump.
- Shueisha Orange Bunko - An imprint focused on women.
- Super Dash Bunko - An imprint focused on teenage boys.

== Shueisha English Edition ==
Shueisha English Edition is an imprint of Shueisha. It publishes Japanese literature, including mystery, fantasy, horror and erotica, in English translation.

- Otsuichi
  - Summer, Fireworks, and My Corpse (May 2013) (horror novel)
  - ZOO (August 2013)
  - Black Fairy Tale (September 2013)
- Jirō Asada
  - The Stationmaster (May 2013)
- Ira Ishida
  - Call Boy (May 2013) (erotica)
- Yoshinori Shimizu
  - Labyrinth (October 2013) (mystery novel)
- Novala Takemoto
  - Emily (November 2013)
- Manabu Makime
  - The Great Shu Ra Ra Boom (December 2013) (fantasy novel)
