= List of Witch Hat Atelier episodes =

Key visual for the series

Witch Hat Atelier is a Japanese anime television series based on the manga series of the same name by Kamome Shirahama. Originally announced in April 2022, the anime adaptation is produced by Bug Films and directed by Ayumu Watanabe, with Jun Shinohara as the assistant director, Hiroaki Kojima as the producer, Hiroshi Seko handling the series composition, Kairi Unabara designing the characters, and Yuka Kitamura composing the music. The series was originally set to release in 2025, before being pushed back "to present the charm of the project at an even higher quality". It aired from April 6 to June 22, 2026, on Tokyo MX and other networks. (Note: The first two episodes were released simultaneously on select streaming platforms, while subsequent episodes are released a week before their televised broadcast. As such, the episode table uses the latter dates.) The opening theme song is "Kaze no Anthem" (風のアンセム; 'Wind's Anthem'), performed by Eve feat. Suis of Yorushika. The ending theme songs, performed by Nakamura Hak, are "Tada Utsukushii Noroi" (ただ美しい呪い; lit. 'Just a Beautiful Curse') (episodes 2, 4, 6–7, 9 and 11–13); "Yoru ni Ukabu" (夜に浮かぶ; lit. 'Floating in the Night') (episodes 3 and 5), and "Hikari" (光り; lit. 'Light'). Crunchyroll is streaming the series worldwide outside of Asia, while Remow licensed it in Southeast Asia.

After the airing of the first season finale, a second season was announced. Crunchyroll will stream the second season.

== Episodes ==
No.	Title	Directed by	Storyboarded by	Chief animation directed by	Original release date
1	"The Magic That Started Everything"; Transliteration: "Hajimari no Mahō" (Japanese: はじまりの魔法)	Yu Harima	Ayumu Watanabe	Kairi Unabara	April 6, 2026
Coco is a young girl who assists in her mother's workshop as a dressmaker. She dreams of becoming a witch, despite knowing that ordinary humans like her have no magical powers. One day, a witch named Qifrey visits the workshop, and he offers his help to repair a damaged magical carriage with magic. Qifrey instructs Coco to keep guard for him to not let anyone, including Coco, watch him while he is working. Coco disobeys Qifrey and sees him fix the carriage through drawing runes with a special ink, realizing that anyone can perform magic with the right tools. Recalling that the same runes appear in a picture book she bought from a masked witch years ago, Coco joyfully starts practicing magic. However, she unwittingly casts a spell that petrifies her mother, before being narrowly rescued by Qifrey. Qifrey plans to erase a remorseful Coco's memories to protect the secret of magic, but realizes Coco is his only lead to finding out the identity of the masked witch who gave her the book. Qifrey takes Coco in as an apprentice instead, and they work to bring her mother back to normal.
2	"The School of the Grassland"; Transliteration: "Sōgen no Manabiya" (Japanese: 草原の学び舎)	Ikuno Yagi	Ikuno Yagi	Kairi Unabara & Hiroaki Karasu	April 13, 2026
Qifrey brings Coco to his atelier. While settling into her new home, Coco is welcomed by the outgoing Tetia and aloof Richeh, who are also Qifrey's apprentices. Qifrey explains to Coco on how magic was regulated and entrusted to a select few after humans abused it to cast dangerous spells, known as forbidden magic, and sow chaos. He also shares about the Tower of Tomes, a library containing every magic book ever written. Qifrey posits they may be able to find a copy of the picture book at the tower, but he advises Coco that individuals are only granted entry if they pass a test called the Librarians' Trial. Coco aspires to start studying as Agott, Qifrey's remaining apprentice, arrives. Agott bitterly rebukes Coco for her actions in petrifying her mother, adding that she does not deem her worthy of becoming an apprentice. Qifrey later gives Coco the tools to perform magic and teaches her the principles of drawing runes. He then tasks Agott to tutor Coco as he leaves to make an errand. Agott immediately places Coco in the first witch test alone to see her capability as an apprentice, catching Coco off-guard.
3	"The Dadah Range Test"; Transliteration: "Dada Sanmyaku no Shiken" (Japanese: ダダ山脈の試験)	Katsuya Oshima	Katsuya Oshima	Kairi Unabara & Hiroaki Karasu	April 20, 2026
Qifrey travels to the Great Hall of Witches and meets Alaira, who deduces he is finding a lead on the Brimmed Cap coven of rogue witches through Coco. Alaira reminds him to be more observant of his apprentices. Meanwhile, Agott sends Coco to the Dadah Range to perform the Consent of the Crown and collect a flower at the summit with limited tools. Agott reluctantly lets Coco borrow her Sylph Shoes that allow flight. Agott warns Coco she has one chance to finish the test to avoid expulsion, as Agott later confides in Tetia of her intention to have Coco fail. Coco takes the test and befriends a Brushbuddy, but she accidentally damages her tools and Agott's shoes. Coco loses hope until she recalls her dressmaker upbringing. She uses her knowledge and skills to improvise a magical glider, allowing her to retrieve the flower. Coco wistfully thanks her mother for her guidance and reunites with a worried Tetia and Qifrey. Although Agott dismisses her accomplishment and Qifrey reprimands her recklessness, he christens Coco by gifting her the witch's cloak and pointed cap. Back at the Dadah Range, the masked witch, who was watching Coco, remarks that "the seed has sprouted".
4	"Meetings in Kalhn"; Transliteration: "Karun de no Deai" (Japanese: カルンでの出会い)	Masamitsu Abe	Masamitsu Abe	Kairi Unabara & Yoshihisa Sato	April 27, 2026
Qifrey takes the apprentices to the witch town of Kalhn to find a pen suited for Coco's skills and background. They arrive at the town's magic stationery shop owned by Nolnoa and his grandson Tartah. Nolnoa tells Coco that the Conjuring Ink used by witches is only extracted from the Silverwood Tree. Coco checks Nolnoa's pens and sees the masked witch stalking her. She pursues them while a confused Tetia, Richeh, and Agott catch up. The apprentices are teleported to a labyrinth after entering an alley, which they recognize as forbidden magic. They are shocked to find a dragon chasing them, and the observing masked witch proclaims that Coco is the Brimmed Caps' hope for the future of magic. The apprentices hide, as a fearful Tetia indirectly blames Coco for their situation. While distracting the dragon, Coco spots a complex rune and unintentionally ruins Agott's work. Agott berates her for constantly causing problems. Agott suggests to Tetia and Richeh on abandoning Coco, leaving the latter guilt-ridden. Tartah alerts Qifrey of the girls' disappearance. Fearing the masked witch is a member of the Brimmed Caps, Qifrey sets out to find his apprentices with the Brushbuddy.
5	"The Dragon's Labyrinth"; Transliteration: "Doragon no Meikyū" (Japanese: 巨鱗竜(ドラゴン)の迷宮)	Kazuki Kawagoe	Kazuki Kawagoe	Kairi Unabara	May 4, 2026
As the apprentices rest, Tetia apologizes to Coco for unfairly blaming her. Tetia also shows off her cloud spell, which she aims to share to others. Coco directs the girls to the rune being guarded by the dragon, and proposes an audacious plan to use Tetia's spell as a bed to not hurt the dragon. Despite doubting her plan, Agott leads them in polishing the spell. Coco studies and practices her peers' drawing methods repeatedly, inspiring Agott to add repetition magic to maintain the cloud's cohesiveness. The apprentices execute the plan and soothe the dragon, much to Coco and Tetia's joy. They then inspect the rune, as the Brushbuddy leads Qifrey to the alley thanks to the scent of Conjuring Ink. A portal to the labyrinth is opened, and the dragon attacks the apprentices. Agott pushes Coco out of harm's way and falls but is saved by Qifrey, who knocks out the dragon. As Qifrey and Agott reunite with Tetia and Richeh, an unconscious Coco is collected by the masked Brimmed Cap. They voice awe at Coco passing their test and release her after giving a gift and promising to teach her forbidden magic when the time comes. Qifrey rescues Coco and applauds her ingenuity and bravery. He later asks Nolnoa to study the rune and bluntly demands him to keep the incident a secret from the Great Hall.
6	"A Light on a Rainy Day"; Transliteration: "Ame no Hi no Tou" (Japanese: 雨の日の灯)	Claire Barbou des Courières	Shiyo Hatsumida	Kairi Unabara, Yoshihisa Sato, & Hiroaki Karasu	May 11, 2026
Coco is dismayed with her insufficient contributions at Kalhn and aims to improve. Qifrey calms Coco by letting her prepare their picnic using magic with Tetia and Richeh, and they enjoy it during a storm. Coco fetches Agott, only to meet the atelier's Watchful Eye Olruggio. Olruggio hears of Coco's run-in with forbidden magic and plans to turn her in to the Great Hall, though Qifrey explains the situation. An exasperated Olruggio urges Qifrey to let the Knights Moralis, the Great Hall's law enforcement branch, handle the case. Qifrey retorts that the Knights Moralis grant no quarter and may erase all of Coco's memories. He accepts responsibility for letting Coco discover the secret of magic, and asserts that if her memories are to be erased, his own should be as well. Stunned by his resolve, Olruggio relents. Coco learns that Olruggio invents contraptions, including the spell that made her love magic. Olruggio sees Coco's passion and reconsiders turning her in. Later, a minstrel named Dagda frantically asks for the atelier's aid in rescuing his caravan stranded on the flooded Staircase River. Sensing an opportunity to prove herself, Agott volunteers to join Qifrey and Olruggio in the rescue.
7	"Who Is Magic For?"; Transliteration: "Dare ga Tame no Mahō" (Japanese: 誰が為の魔法)	Takumi Dōyama	Takumi Dōyama	Kairi Unabara & Hiroaki Karasu	May 18, 2026
Despite Qifrey's concerns for Agott's readiness to conduct fieldwork, Olruggio takes her to the Staircase River. Olruggio relegates Agott to menial tasks upon seeing her impatience, irritating Agott. After arriving with the apprentices, Qifrey helps Olruggio rescue the caravan. Tetia and Richeh join them to assess the damage, leaving Coco and Agott to assist the minstrels. Dagda's adoptive son, Custas, attempts to retrieve the caravan's cargo, but is pinned by a falling boulder which crushes his legs. Coco is also caught in the fall and becomes trapped in the riverbanks, causing the minstrels to seek Agott for guidance. Agott, who views this as her chance to prove her capabilities after being seen by the Arklaum family and witch society as a failure, is brought to reality by Coco's pleas. Agott analyzes their circumstances and casts a light spell to distract the minstrels and send a signal. Coco uses Agott's distraction to pulverize the boulder and free Custas, calming Dagda. Coco and Agott express relief until they are apprehended by the Knights Moralis and their captain, Easthies. He accuses Coco of using forbidden magic and points to her pulverizing spell turning the river to sand, shocking Agott and horrifying Coco. Easthies prepares to erase Coco's memories as punishment for her perceived actions.
8	"The Misgivings of the Knights Moralis"; Transliteration: "Makei-dan no Ginen" (Japanese: 魔警団の疑念)	Toshihiro Maeya	Toshihiro Maeya	Kairi Unabara & Hiroaki Karasu	May 25, 2026
Qifrey, Olruggio, and the apprentices prove Coco's innocence to the Knights Moralis while redirecting them to helping the minstrels. Easthies yields but warns that the Knights Moralis will continue investigating the atelier. Qifrey arranges for Agott's entry in the second witch test to Agott's delight and retrieves Coco's Conjuring Ink. Qifrey surmises her ink has been tainted with Brimmed Cap blood as a gift from the dragon fight. He travels to Nolnoa's shop with Coco under the guise of acquiring her pen to confirm his suspicions. Coco learns about Tartah's work of arranging the shop's colorful magic dyes in jars. Meanwhile, Qifrey tests the tainted ink against Nolnoa's wishes to cast a small but powerful blinding spell. Nolnoa argues on reporting their findings to the Great Hall. Unwilling to give up a key lead on the Brimmed Caps, Qifrey wipes Nolnoa's knowledge. Coco and Tartah are blinded by the spell and knock down the jars, frustrating Tartah as he cannot see color with his Silverwash. Tartah adds his disability makes him unable to become a witch. Coco reluctantly leaves with Qifrey, as Tartah finds Nolnoa having no recollection of the blinding spell's flash of light.
9	"A Nightmare Stained in Black"; Transliteration: "Kuro ni Shizumu Akumu" (Japanese: 黒に沈む悪夢)	Morihito Abe	Akira Yamada	Kairi Unabara & Hiroaki Karasu	June 1, 2026
While Tartah suspects Qifrey is involved in Nolnoa's memory lapse, Qifrey lectures the apprentices on the five tests to become a full-fledged witch. A displeased Richeh criticizes their limitations on creative freedom, while Agott plans on finishing all the tests to follow the Arklaums in working as a librarian at the Tower of Tomes. Coco has a nightmare of causing destruction from becoming a witch, prompting her to continue studying late at night. Meanwhile, Qifrey secretly attempts to extract the tainted Conjuring Ink's contents to narrow his search for the Brimmed Caps. The masked Brimmed Cap appears to subdue Qifrey using his fear of water and destroy the ink before vanishing. Later, Coco returns the repaired Sylph Shoes to Agott. Agott wonders why Coco did not tell Qifrey and Olruggio that Agott had forced her into taking the first test. Coco explains she could have waited for help, but resolved to do the test to gain experience and prove her worth. Coco collapses from exhaustion, and a worried Agott informs Qifrey of the emergency. Qifrey takes Coco to a hospital in Kalhn with Tartah's help. Qifrey compliments his perceptiveness when Tartah begins questioning him.
10	"A Promise in Silver"; Transliteration: "Gin'iro no Yakusoku" (Japanese: 銀色の約束)	Akihiro Obata	Jun Shinohara	Kairi Unabara, Haruhito Takada, & Hiroaki Karasu	June 8, 2026
Qifrey tells Tartah to hold off his questions as they learn of Coco's fever. Tartah remains wary of Qifrey and returns home. Qifrey assists the locals in extinguishing a fire at a tavern, while Tartah heads back to the hospital after forgetting his pointed cap. Tartah sees Coco's worsening fever, so he tries to help by administering a medicine. However, Tartah grows frustrated by his inability to distinguish the medicines, recalling how he was shunned by witch society due to his Silverwash. An ailing Coco teaches him a spell that breaks down the medicine into its basic ingredients, remarking that it will help them both. Tartah improves the spell and finds Coco's medicine, leaving him hopeful to begin practicing magic. After quelling the fire, Qifrey sees Tartah accompany the recovered Coco. Tartah asks Qifrey about the flash of light, though Qifrey lies on having no memory of it. Tartah promises to carve a custom pen for Coco as thanks before leaving with Nolnoa. As Coco and Qifrey return to the atelier, a cloaked and formless Brimmed Cap voices intent on sabotaging the second test to the masked Brimmed Cap.
11	"The Test in Serpentback Cave"; Transliteration: "Hebi no Se-dōkutsu no Shiken" (Japanese: 蛇の背洞窟の試験)	Hayato Sakai	Hayato Sakai	Kairi Unabara, Yoshihisa Sato, & Hiroaki Karasu	June 15, 2026
Agott softens her biases towards Coco after seeing her growth. Qifrey motivates Coco and Richeh to continue studying, but Richeh stubbornly refuses. Richeh explains to Coco her disdain for casting spells that are not of her own creation. Richeh later has a dream of her older brother Riliphin praising her individuality and creativity. She wakes up to find Qifrey bringing her and the apprentices to the Serpentback Cave to confirm their readiness for fieldwork through the Sincerity of the Shield. They meet Alaira and Euini, who is being chastised by his teacher Kukrow for repeatedly failing the test. Alaira explains that the test involves escorting myrphons through the cave using magic without exposing its secret. She gives cloaks to the group to mimic the myrphons. Richeh learns that Qifrey also arranged her entry for the test with Agott and Euini. Richeh is angered at Qifrey deceiving her, though she reluctantly trusts him upon being assured the test can enrich her. Kukrow ditches Euini and leaves much to Qifrey and Alaira's chagrin. Agott, Richeh, and Euini begin the test with Alaira proctoring them, and they find the cave's labyrinthine path. Qifrey reveals to Coco and Tetia that the Serpentback Cave formed as a result of forbidden magic like the Dadah Range.
12	"The Shadow of Romonon"; Transliteration: "Romonōn no Kage" (Japanese: ロモノーンの影)	Toshihiro Maeya	Katsuya Oshima	Yoshihisa Sato	June 22, 2026
Qifrey tells of the cave being a remnant of Romonon, a cavern city clad in magical gold that collapsed due to internal greed and arrogance. He silently hopes that magic can be used for good again. Back in the cave, Agott, Richeh, and Euini escort the myrphons through the path, where Richeh recounts how her former teacher abused her for refusing to follow the rigid teachings of magic. Richeh uses her own spells to progress even after encountering a gap in the path, with Agott following suit. Euini, who has been conditioned to follow the teachings and suffered emotional abuse under Kukrow, tearfully prepares to give up. Richeh hears of Euini studying magic in solitude and motivates him to use it. Euini panics and hides inside his cloak, when he sees the cloak's mimicking spell rune. Euini modifies the rune to conceal himself in the dark. Euini continues the test and thanks Richeh. Alaira reinforces the test's benefit to solve a situation in different ways. She tries to ask Richeh about Qifrey until they are ambushed by the cloaked Brimmed Cap. Alaira warns the apprentices to not be led astray and sends out her pointed cap before being transported elsewhere.
13	"Forbidden Magic"; Transliteration: "Kinji Rareta Mahō" (Japanese: 禁じられた魔法)	Masamitsu Abe & Jun Shinohara	Ayumu Watanabe	Kairi Unabara & Hiroaki Karasu	June 29, 2026
Qifrey, Coco, and Tetia receive Alaira's pointed cap and realize the test is in peril. They are suddenly attacked by the cave ruins and fall down an abyss, during which Qifrey is incapacitated. Meanwhile, Agott, Richeh, and Euini run from the cloaked Brimmed Cap, who taunts their futile escape. Richeh realizes her limited knowledge of spells, but Euini provides his collection for Richeh to use. Agott also deduces that the Brimmed Caps are targeting Coco, so she tries to goad the cloaked Brimmed Cap on abandoning their search. However, they capture and mock Agott and prepare to brand her with forbidden magic to draw out Coco. Richeh and Euini disrupt the procedure and rescue Agott, prompting the cloaked Brimmed Cap to brand Euini instead. Euini is forcibly transformed into a scaled wolf and flees in fear, horrifying Agott and Richeh. The cloaked Brimmed Cap slyly challenges them to revert Euini's transformation. Agott urges Richeh to finish the test and call for help to compensate for Richeh's shortcomings, while Agott chases after Euini. Coco, Tetia, and Qifrey regain consciousness and are confronted by Romonon's gold-coated inhabitants, who hold a deep hatred for witches. Qifrey, despite being gravely wounded, declares he will protect Coco and Tetia and makes a stand.

== Home media release ==
=== Japanese ===
Vol.	Episodes	Cover character(s)	Release date	Ref.
1	1–6	Coco, Agott, Tetia and Richeh	July 29, 2026	
2	7–13	Qifrey and Olruggio	September 30, 2026	
