= List of Witch Hat Atelier chapters =

Witch Hat Atelier is a Japanese manga series written and illustrated by Kamome Shirahama. The series follows a girl named Coco, who becomes a witch apprentice to fulfill her longtime dream of becoming a witch and restore her mother whom she accidentally turned into stone.

The series started in Kodansha's seinen manga magazine Morning Two on July 22, 2016. The magazine ceased print publication and moved to a digital release starting on August 4, 2022. Kodansha has compiled its chapters into individual tankōbon volumes. The first volume was published on January 23, 2017. As of April 23, 2026, 16 volumes have been published.

In North America, Kodansha USA announced the acquisition of the series in July 2018. The first volume was published on April 9, 2019.

A spin-off manga series by Hiromi Satō, titled Witch Hat Atelier Kitchen, started in Morning Two on November 22, 2019.

== Volumes ==
No.	Original release date	Original ISBN	English release date	English ISBN
1	January 23, 2017	978-4-06-388690-0	April 9, 2019	978-1-63236-770-9
Chapters 1–5
Coco dreams of becoming a witch despite knowing only those born with magic talent can do so. One day, she learns that anyone can use magic with the right tools through secretly watching a witch named Qifrey perform magic. Coco practices magic using a book and ink she bought from a mysterious masked witch, but she accidentally turns her mother into stone. Qifrey takes Coco in to help restore her mother and find a lead on the Brimmed Cap coven of rogue witches. He brings her to his atelier where she starts studying magic with Agott, Tetia, and Richeh. Coco learns that magic was once common knowledge but after ages of wars and catastrophes had its use restricted to only a few witches, who keep the truth about its nature a secret from the rest of the world. After being forced by Agott to pass the first test and becoming Qifrey's official apprentice, Coco spots the masked Brimmed Cap while searching for a pen at Nolnoa's shop and pursues them. Coco unwittingly traps herself and her fellow apprentices in a labyrinth, where they are chased by a dragon.
2	August 23, 2017	978-4-06-510138-4; 978-4-06-510203-9 (LE)	June 25, 2019	978-1-63236-804-1
Chapters 6–11
By working together, the apprentices use their magic to distract the dragon and open a breach in the labyrinth for Qifrey to break in and defeat the dragon before rescuing them. The masked Brimmed Cap grows impressed with Coco passing their test at the labyrinth and continues observing her. Back in the atelier, Coco continues her studying and meets Qifrey's supervisor and close friend Olruggio. Qifrey and Olruggio lead the apprentices in helping a group of minstrels stranded in a rough river, and Coco and Agott work to rescue one of the minstrels named Custas, who became trapped after a falling boulder disabled his legs. However, Coco and Agott are suddenly apprehended by the Knights Moralis, witches who maintain order in the witch society. The group's captain Easthies accuses Coco of using forbidden magic during the rescue and decides to erase her memories.
3	February 23, 2018	978-4-06-510930-4; 978-4-06-510894-9 (LE)	August 27, 2019	978-1-63236-805-8
Chapters 12–17
The atelier proves Coco's innocence to Easthies, though he warns that the Knights Moralis will continue investigating them. Qifrey arranges for Agott's entry to the second test. He also suspects the Brimmed Caps tampered with Coco's magic, so he visits Nolnoa's shop to confirm his doubts. Upon learning he has gained a key lead on the Brimmed Caps with Coco's ink, Qifrey wipes Nolnoa's knowledge to prevent him from reporting their findings. He tries to extract the ink's contents, but is subdued by the masked Brimmed Cap. Coco then contracts a fever after numerous sleepless nights of studying, so Qifrey brings her to a hospital with the help of Nolnoa's grandson Tartah. Coco assists Tartah, who is unable to train as a witch due to being shunned for his Silverwash, in casting magic and finding a medicine to improve her health. Warmed by her gesture, Tartah promises to carve a pen for Coco. Coco and Qifrey head back to the atelier, as a cloaked Brimmed Cap plans on sabotaging the second test.
4	September 21, 2018	978-4-06-512681-3; 978-4-06-511766-8 (LE)	November 12, 2019	978-1-63236-860-7
Chapters 18–23; Bonus Chapter (1)
Qifrey and the apprentices travel to the Serpentback Cave for Agott and Richeh to perform the second test, despite Richeh's disdain for the tests' inflexibility. They work with the timid Euini in progressing through the test, with Alaira proctoring them. The cloak Brimmed Cap, Sasaran, ambushes the group and incapacitates Alaira. He then forcibly transforms Euini into a wolf and slyly challenges Agott and Richeh to restore him. Meanwhile, Qifrey shares to Coco and Tetia of the cave being a remnant of the decadent golden city of Romonon. They are later alerted to the test being in danger when the cave ruins suddenly attack them, causing them to fall down an abyss. Coco and Tetia wake up to find a badly wounded Qifrey and Romonon's gold-coated inhabitants cornering them.
5	May 23, 2019	978-4-06-515597-4; 978-4-06-515598-1 (LE)	March 17, 2020	978-1-63236-929-1
Chapters 24–29
6	November 21, 2019	978-4-06-517778-5; 978-4-06-517909-3 (LE)	September 15, 2020	978-1-64651-010-8
Chapters 30–35; Bonus Chapter (2)
7	May 22, 2020	978-4-06-519266-5; 978-4-06-520266-1 (LE)	February 2, 2021	978-1-64651-078-8
Chapters 36–40
8	December 23, 2020	978-4-06-521625-5; 978-4-06-521626-2 (LE)	September 28, 2021	978-1-64651-269-0
Chapters 41–45; Bonus Chapter (3)
9	July 21, 2021	978-4-06-524100-4; 978-4-06-524098-4 (LE)	June 21, 2022	978-1-64651-447-2
Chapters 46–51
10	April 21, 2022	978-4-06-527412-5	November 29, 2022	978-1-64651-618-6
Chapters 52–57
11	October 21, 2022	978-4-06-529605-9; 978-4-06-529604-2 (LE)	September 12, 2023	978-1-64651-745-9
Chapters 58–62; Bonus Chapter (4)
12	June 22, 2023	978-4-06-531969-7; 978-4-06-531829-4 (LE)	May 21, 2024	979-8-88877-079-5
Chapters 63–68; Bonus Chapter (5)
13	February 22, 2024	978-4-06-534652-5; 978-4-06-534727-0 (LE)	January 14, 2025	979-8-88877-330-7
Chapters 69–75
14	April 23, 2025	978-4-06-539182-2	March 17, 2026	979-8-88877-685-8
Chapters 76–81
15	November 21, 2025	978-4-06-541519-1; 978-4-06-541520-7 (LE)	December 8, 2026	979-8-88877-978-1
Chapters 82–88
16	April 23, 2026	978-4-06-543152-8; 978-4-06-543150-4 (LE)	—	—
Chapters 89–94

=== Chapters not yet in tankōbon format ===
- Chapters 95–100
