= Cao =

Cao or CAO may refer to:

== Companies or organizations ==
- Air China Cargo, ICAO airline designator CAO
- CA Oradea, Romanian football club
- CA Osasuna, Spanish football club
- Canadian Association of Optometrists
- Canadian Association of Orthodontists
- Central Allocation Office, cross border electricity transmission capacity auction office
- Central Applications Office, Irish organisation that oversees college applications
- Civil Aviation Office of Poland
- Iran Civil Aviation Organization
- Office of the Chief Administrative Officer of the United States House of Representatives
- Compliance Advisor/Ombudsman, accountability arm of the World Bank
- Council for Adult Education, later Centre for Adult Education, in Victoria, Australia
- Commission on Audit

== Job titles ==
- Chief Academic Officer of a University, often titled the Provost
- Chief accounting officer of a company
- Chief accessibility officer of a company
- Chief administrative officer of a company
- Chief analytics officer of a company
- Compliance Advisor/Ombudsman, an independent office that reviews complaints

== Names ==
- Cao (Chinese surname) (曹)
- Cao (Vietnamese surname)

== People ==
- Cao (footballer, born 1968), Portuguese footballer
- Cao Cao (died 220), founder of Cao Wei, China
- Cao Hamburger (born 1962), Brazilian director, screenwriter and producer
- Cao Pi (c.187–226), emperor of Cao Wei, China
- Cao Yu (1910–1996), Chinese playwright
- Cao Yupeng (born 1990), Chinese snooker player
- Carlos Alberto Caó (1941–2018), Brazilian activist, lawyer, and politician
- Diogo Cão, a 15th-century Portuguese explorer
- Joseph Cao (born 1967), United States politician
- Lady of Cao, a Moche mummy, Peru
- Longbing Cao (born 1969), data scientist
- Pierre Cao (1937–2026), Luxembourgish composer and conductor

== Places ==
- Cao (state), a Chinese vassal state of the Zhou Dynasty (1046 - 221 BCE)
- Cao County, Shandong, China
- Cao Wei, also called Wei, one of the regimes that competed for control of China during the Three Kingdoms period (220 - 280 CE)
- Magdalena de Cao, a town on the north coast of Peru, surrounded by major archaeological sites, c. 50km north of the city of Trujillo

== Other uses ==
- Cao (bull), a legendary bull in Meitei mythology
- CaO, the chemical symbol for calcium oxide
- Cão!, an album by Portuguese band Ornatos Violeta
- CA Osasuna, a Spanish sport club
- a Child Arrangement Order under English family law
- Chlorophyllide-a oxygenase, an enzyme
- Cold air outbreak, an intense and/or prolonged cold weather wave of air
- Controller Access Object, as described in the ORiN robot interface
