= Bom Dia =

Bom Dia may refer to:

- Bom Dia, a newspaper in São José do Rio Preto
- Bom Dia Brasil, a Brazilian television news program on Rede Globo
- Bom Dia & Companhia, a morning children's television block that aired on SBT
- Bom Dia Portugal, a television program on RTP Informação
- Café Bom Dia, coffee producer
- Bom Dia (album), a 2004 album by Pluto
