= Human and Hope Association =

Human and Hope Association is a registered NGO in Siem Reap, Cambodia. It is run entirely by a team of Khmer employees, who focus on reducing poverty in their community.

== History ==
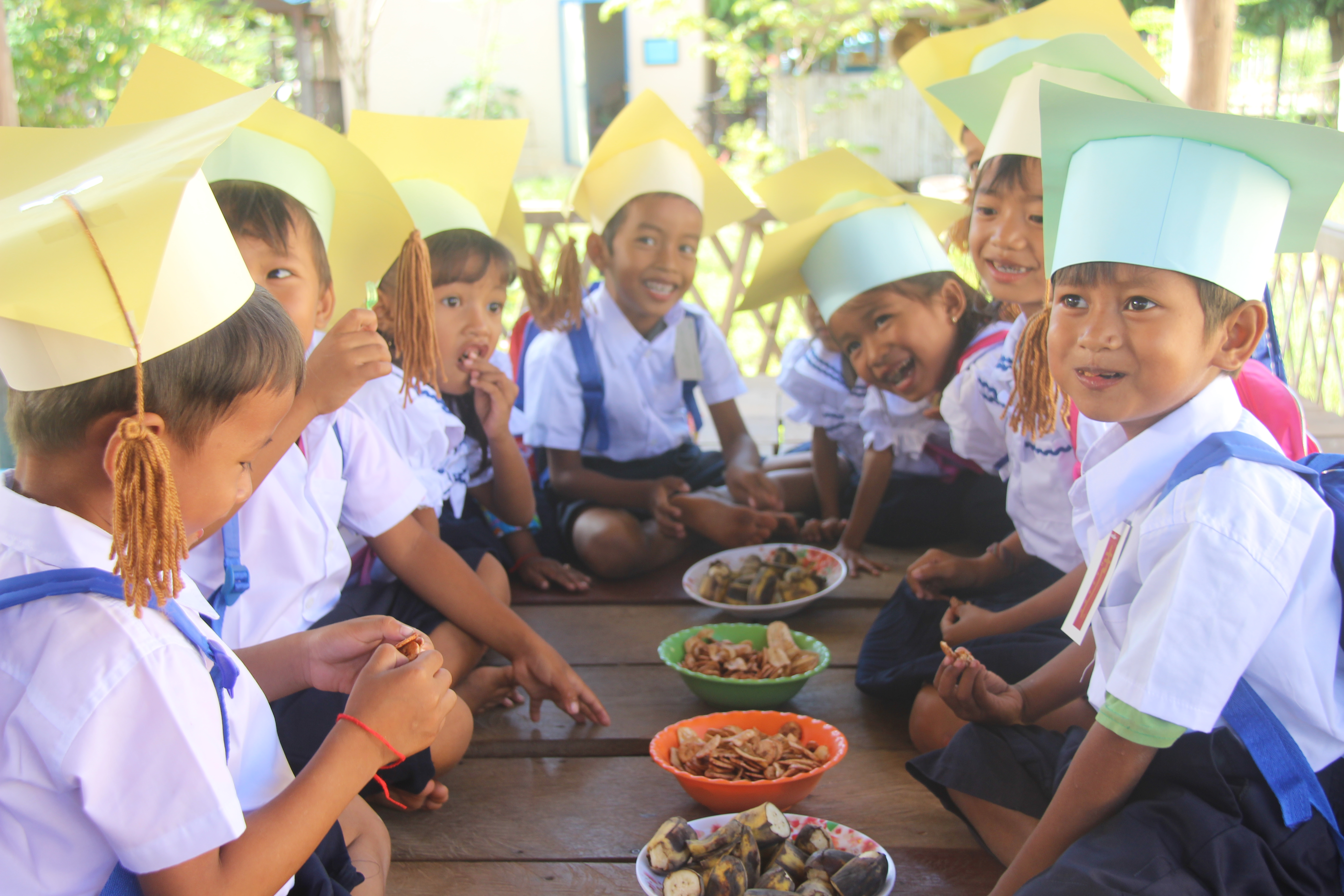
Preschool students celebrating their graduation ceremony at Human and Hope Association in 2016.

Human and Hope Association was established in March 2011 in Svay Prey Village, Siem Reap, Cambodia. The local community members began teaching English at a fee of 50 cents per student each month in order to cover their costs. Over the next 18 months, the volunteer team recruited students through word of mouth, posting announcements at the local Primary School and gaining the support of the Monks who preached to the community.

From December 2012, Human and Hope Association began initiating new projects that focused on education, vocational training and community support. They began building their own community centre in May 2014, which was officially opened in October 2014 in Sambour Village, Siem Reap.

In July 2016, Human and Hope Association became entirely Khmer operated with the departure of their Australian Operations Manager.

== Mission ==
The mission of Human and Hope Association is 'To empower Cambodians to create sustainable futures for themselves through projects focused on education, community development and vocational training.'

== Programs ==
Human and Hope Association provides the following programs to their community:

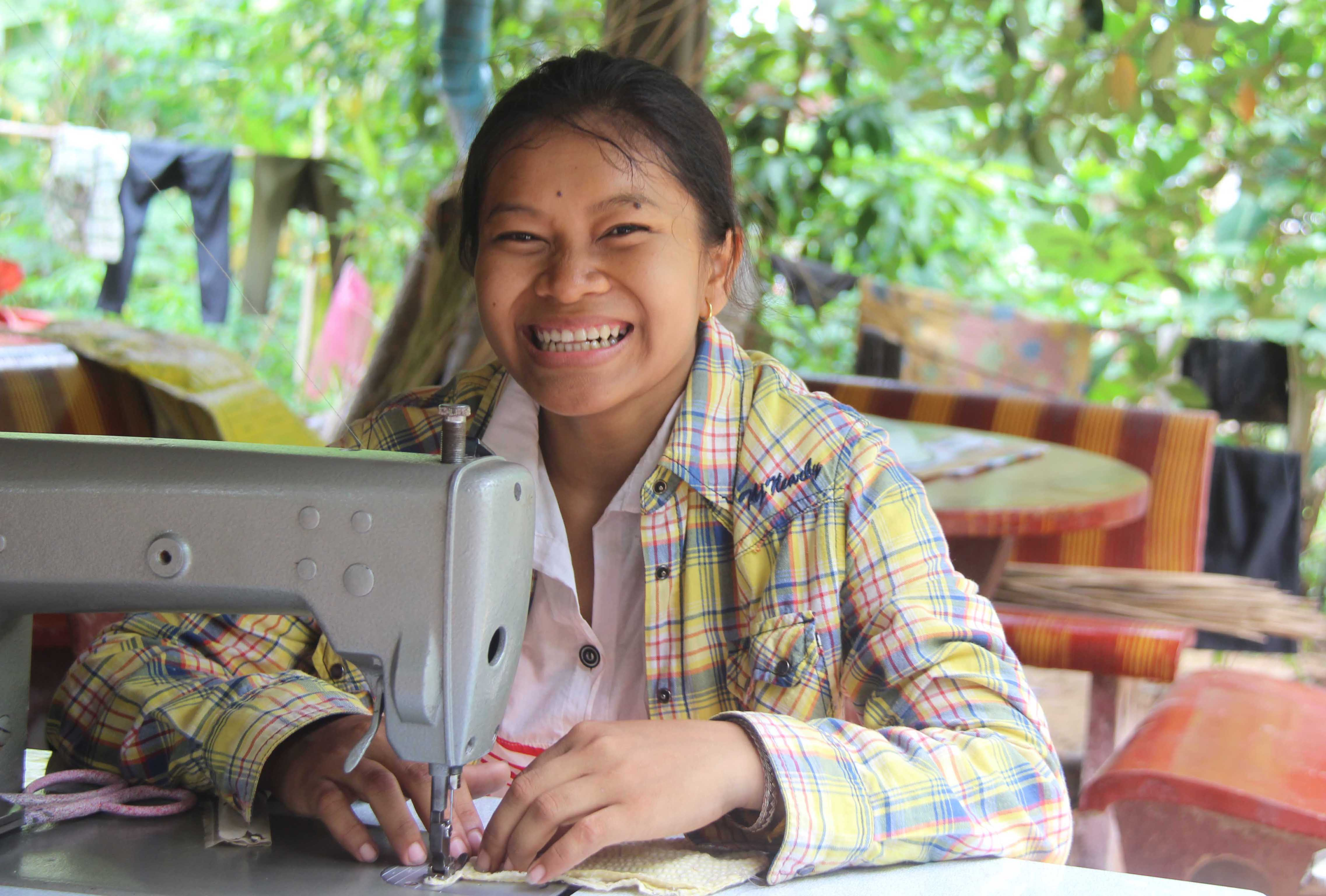
A student with the sewing machine that she purchased through the Human and Hope Association sewing machine microfinance program.

- English language classes - These classes are taught from textbooks developed by Human and Hope Association.
- Khmer language classes - Khmer is the native language of Cambodia. These classes are in addition to public school classes.
- Preschool - This program is for five-year-olds who make the transition to public school once graduating.
- Library - The library is open daily, with children accessing various resources to improve their knowledge.
- Art classes - This class is held every Sunday, and is free for all. In addition to art classes, Human and Hope Association also take part in the Giant Puppet Parade each year.
- Hygiene - Every six months, hygiene workshops are held at Human and Hope Association. The students are supplied with soap provided by Eco-Soap Bank and toothbrushes and toothpaste from private donors.
- Sewing training - This program runs for 10 months at a time. It trains Cambodian women in sewing so they can increase their income.
- Farming training - The farming program runs for four months at a time, teaching Cambodians chemical-free farming techniques.
- Community outreach - This outreach involves the staff at Human and Hope Association offering advice to community members who face various issues.
- Community workshops - Human and Hope Association holds community workshops to address social issues. Topics include Good Touch, Bad Touch, road safety, budgeting and domestic violence.

== Funding Sources ==
Human and Hope Association receives their funding from various sources, including:

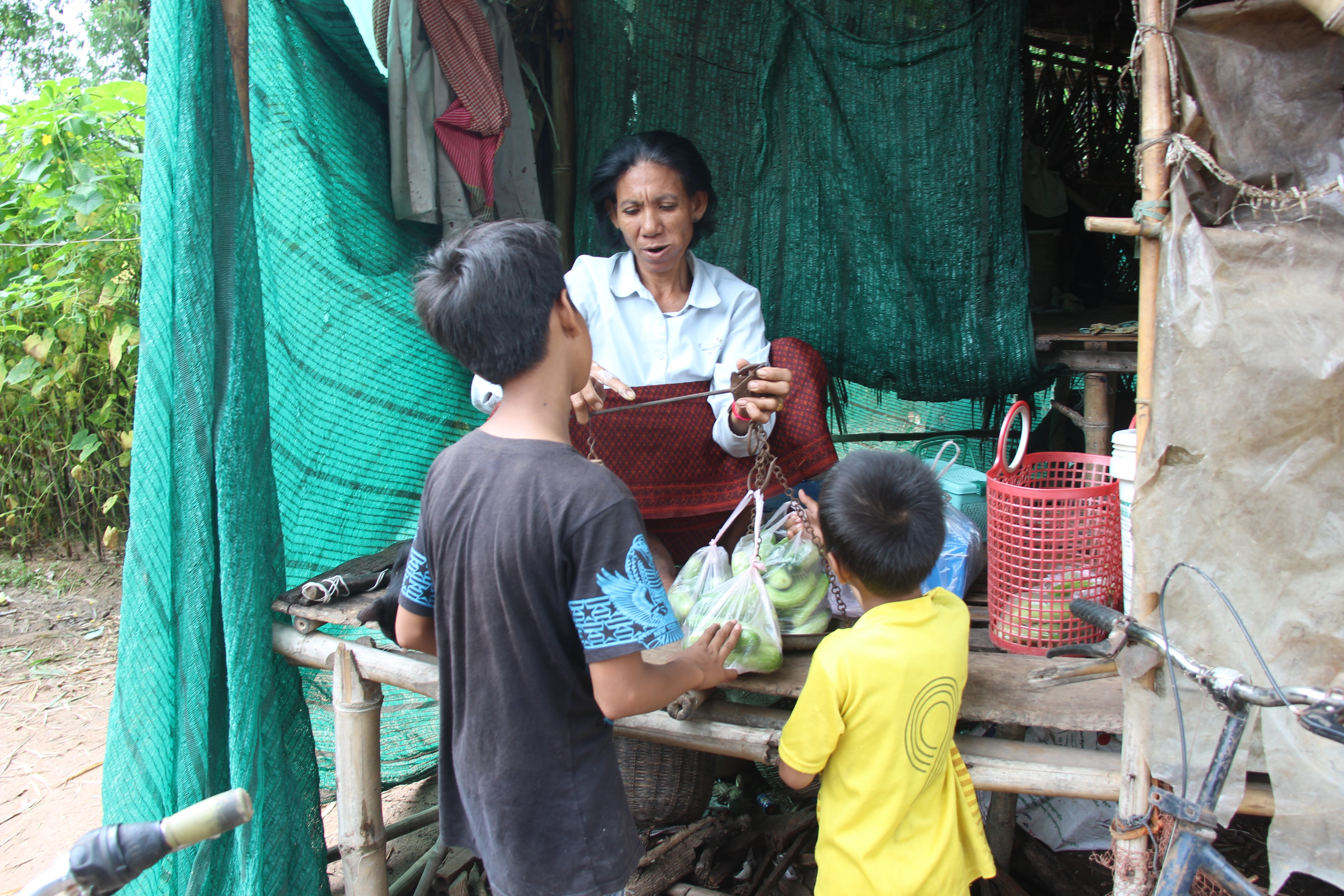
A student from the Family Farm program at Human and Hope Association selling vegetables she has grown.

- Human and Hope Association Incorporated - This Australian-based fundraising board applies for grants, holds crowdfunding campaigns and speaks publicly about the cause. Human and Hope Association Incorporated is registered with the Australian Charities and Not-for-Profit Commission (ACNC).
- Monthly donors
- Grants - Previous organizations to offer grants have included the SEA Fund, Forix Foundation and the Sumar Lakhani Foundation.
- Small businesses - Life Interwoven donated their profits in 2016 and 2017 to the Human and Hope Association education program. Seyla's Sewing and Tailoring donates $5 from every order to the sewing program. Samaky donates 10% from every consulting fee to the organization. Alexandria Main donates 20% of proceeds from their beach bags to Human and Hope Association.
- Self-generated income - Human and Hope Association sells vegetables from their farm, charges 50 cents tuition a month from students and has a handicraft business.
