= Kodjo Amegnisso Tossou =

Kodjo Amegnisso Tossou (born 24 December 1966, in Sokode, Togo) is a Togolese politician and businessman. Tossou studied at Cheikh Anta Diop University, from which he received a degree in organizational management. After working for a number of pharmacies in Togo, he established a network of businesses in West Africa as a merchant of high-tech goods, selling brands from Europe.

In 1990, Tossou founded World Aid for Children, Inc. As founder and CEO, Tossou has spent much of his career supporting, educating (especially through vocational training), and representing the needs of disadvantaged children. In 1990, he founded the Association of the Struggle against Unemployment. Tossou returned to Togo in April 1992 and founded the Togolese Labour Party (Parti Liberal Togolais-PLT) the next month. He has led the party since its foundation.
