= A Livid Lady's Guide to Getting Even =

Japanese light novel series

- A Livid Lady's Guide to Getting Even: How I Crushed My Homeland with My Mighty Grimoires
- First light novel volume cover

ブチ切れ令嬢は報復を誓いました。 ～魔導書の力で祖国を叩き潰します～ (Buchigire Reijō wa Hōfuku o Chikachimashita: Madōsho no Chikara de Sokoku o Tatakitsubushimasu)
- Genre: Fantasy
- Novel series
- Written by: Metabo Hagure
- Published by: Shōsetsuka ni Narō
- Original run: October 6, 2020 – present
- Light novel
- Written by: Metabo Hagure
- Illustrated by: Masami
- Published by: Hobby Japan
- English publisher: NA: J-Novel Club
- Imprint: HJ Novels
- Original run: May 19, 2022 – present
- Volumes: 8
- Manga
- Written by: Metabo Hagure
- Illustrated by: Imo Ōno
- Published by: Hobby Japan
- English publisher: NA: J-Novel Club
- Imprint: HJ Comics
- Magazine: Comic Fire
- Original run: May 19, 2022 – present
- Volumes: 12
- Anime television series
- Directed by: Naoyuki Kuzuya
- Written by: Mitsutaka Hirota
- Music by: Satoshi Hōno; Karin Nakano
- Studio: Studio Comet
- Licensed by: Remow
- Original network: AT-X, TV Tokyo, BS11, TUF, Miyatele, ABS, TUY, MRO
- Original run: July 6, 2026 – September 21, 2026
- Episodes: 12

A Livid Lady's Guide to Getting Even: How I Crushed My Homeland with My Mighty Grimoires (Japanese: ブチ切れ令嬢は報復を誓いました。 ～魔導書の力で祖国を叩き潰します～, Hepburn: Buchigire Reijō wa Hōfuku o Chikachimashita: Madōsho no Chikara de Sokoku o Tatakitsubushimasu) is a Japanese light novel series written by Metabo Hagure and illustrated by Masami. It was originally serialized as a web novel on the web service Shōsetsuka ni Narō beginning in October 2020, before being published as a light novel under Hobby Japan's HJ Novels imprint in May 2022. A manga adaptation illustrated by Imo Ōno began serialization on Hobby Japan's Comic Fire service in May 2022. An anime television series adaptation produced by Studio Comet premiered from July to September 2026.

== Plot ==
The series follows Elizabeth Leiston, the daughter of the prime minister of the Kingdom of Haldoria, and the crown prince's fiancée. One day, he suddenly breaks off the engagement and imprisons her. Angered by the betrayal, Elizabeth goes into exile and seeks revenge against Haldoria and those who wronged her, forming an alliance with the Yutear Empire.

== Characters ==
=== Traitre Commercial Firm ===
Elizabeth Leiston (エリザベート・レイストン, Erizabēto Reisuton)
Voiced by: Saori Ōnishi
The daughter of the Kingdom of Haldoria's prime minister, she was raised to be the country's next queen and has long run it from the shadows. However, she is imprisoned after her fiancé, Prince Friede, and his new lover, Sylvia, spread a false rumor that she tried to assassinate the latter, leading to their engagement being cancelled. Still expected to continue her duties, she finally has had enough and, after escaping, defects to the neighboring Yutear Empire, where she forms the Traitre Commercial Firm to avenge herself against Haldoria by destroying the kingdom. However, over time, those around her grow concerned about how ruthless she is becoming in her quest for vengeance.
Aside from being a political, martial, and magical prodigy, she possesses seven grimoires, each with its own special ability.
Mireille Katarina (ミレイ・カタリア, Mirei Kataria)
Voiced by: Ikumi Hasegawa
Elizabeth's personal maid and the only person in the Kingdom of Haldoria who remained loyal to her after Friede broke off their engagement, after which she convinces her to abandon the country. She subsequently defected to the neighboring Yutear Empire with Elizabeth, where she continues serving as her mistress' aide in her new trading company. However, in convincing Elizabeth to defect, she also unintentionally sparked her desire for vengeance.
She can turn invisible and create illusions.
Misha Tail (ミーシャ・テイル, Mīsha Teiru)
Voiced by: Ayumi Uehara
A catgirl slave who currently works at Elizabeth's company after being bought by Elizabeth.
She is a skilled fighter.
Lunoa Carlton (ルノア・カールトン, Runoa Kāruton)
Voiced by: Yui Ogura
A girl Elizabeth healed after a carriage hit her, who later becomes an apprentice at the company. She is often horrified by what Elizabeth shows her about the world, but becomes desensitized to it; though she holds onto her morality better than her boss. She is also Grantz's daughter.
Aside from being taught to handle basic paperwork and business relations, she has a skill called Analyze, which she can use to identify objects.
Grantz
Lunoa's father, who previously worked for Jackman. After Elizabeth got him to sway Jackman into sabotaging her company so she can take control of it once Jackman's crimes are exposed, he now works for Elizabeth.
Stia
Grantz's assistant, who also works at Elizabeth's company.
Arnauld Langley
A butler who works for Elizabeth.
Maverick
A clerk who works for Elizabeth.

=== Yutear Empire ===
Lucas Lebrick (ルーカス・レブリック, Rūkasu Reburikku)
Voiced by: Yōhei Azakami
An ambassador from the Yutear Empire who helps Elizabeth gain asylum after she was falsely imprisoned and later lends her money to start her trading company, believing that the young lady could become a great asset to his nation. What he does not realize, however, is that Elizabeth is using him and the empire to achieve her vengeance and is more than willing to undermine him if it serves her ends.
Tida (ティーダ, Tīda)
Voiced by: Yū Serizawa
A nun who becomes involved in Elizabeth's business. While maintaining a fairly naive and gullible demeanor, she is also a murderous maniac who sees criminals as monsters and kills them without hesitation.
She wields a scythe that regenerates her wounds and strengthens her body for each living being she kills with it.
Elsa Archfield (エルザ・アーチフィールド, Eruza Āchifīrudo)
Voiced by: Shizuka Ishigami
The leader of a group of adventurers called the Sharp Edge, who allies with Elizabeth during a war. She also wields a divine artifact.
Lisa
A member of the Sharp Edge.
Marty
A beastman who is a member of the Sharp Edge. Though he looks like a girl, he is really a guy.
Gazaru Jackman
A greedy merchant who tries to sabotage Elizabeth's trading company, but his efforts are thwarted and he is punished for his actions. Grantz was the one who manipulated him into doing this at Elizabeth's direction so she can seize control of his company.
Luis
The heads priest of the Church of Libris and an ally to Elizabeth.
Arte Hilgardie
A woman who works for the Merchants' Guild Legal Department.
Cedric Luins
The owner of a slave establishment. Unlike other slave traders, he treats his slaves with respect.
Ygul
A doctor who helped Elizabeth in the war against Sarjas.
Albert Guide
A dragonewt who owns Yutear's largest trading company.
Hilde Callard
A demon who owns a company called the Controller of the Red Lights Districts. She is one of the licensed merchants who allies with Elizabeth.
Darc Hokins
A chief who finances nobles and firms. He is distrustful of Elizabeth.
Lotton Flywork
An elf who owns Yutear's largest inn group. Like Darc, he also distrusts Elizabeth.
Yuuka Kusunoki
A doctor who works for Yutear. She is also an A-rank adventurer.
Gaien Drafan
A dwarf who serves as Yutear's blacksmith.
Sergio
The owner of a guild in Yutear.
Sarasa
Sergio's assistant.

=== Kingdom of Haldoria ===
Friede Haldoria (フリード・ハルドリア, Furīdo Harudoria)
Voiced by: Masaaki Mizunaka
Elizabeth's ex-fiancé, who broke off their engagement after gaining an interest in another woman, Sylvia Lockit, but was unaware that he was manipulated by Sylvia into doing this. Not only does Friede blindly believes Sylvia, but he also turns out be a genuine evil person by spreading a rumor that Elizabeth tried to assassinate Sylvia and taking over the kingdom for herself. Friede is shown to be a complete selfish idiot, who slowly ruins the kingdom and acts like a tyrant and plans to overthrow his father. Unknown to Friede, his and Sylvia's actions will lead to their destruction by Elizabeth. He eventually loses his position due to his counterfeit scheme being exposed by Elizabeth and his relationship with Sylvia collapses.
Sylvia Lockit (シルビア・ロックイート, Shirubia Rokkuīto)
Voiced by: Marika Kōno
A noble woman who charms Friede and has a terrible relationship with her cruel family. Elizabeth was believed to have pushed her down the stairs (though this was actually a lie), angering Friede and leading him to call off the engagement. She then becomes Friede's new fiancée, Sylvia only used Friede to become queen and live a life of luxury, but Sylvia shows no effort to help the kingdom and refuses to do princess training, which is a very important duty. Unknown to Sylvia, her and Friede's actions will lead to their destruction by Elizabeth. After her family was killed and her relationship with Friede collapses, she is stuck in Haldoria's castle with her luxurious life stripped away.
Rozelia Fadgar (ロゼリア・ファドガル, Rozeria Fadogaru)
Voiced by: Asami Seto
A woman who serves as a replacement for Elizabeth in Haldoria. Unlike Elizabeth, she is cunning and somewhat manipulative, but also dislikes Friede and Sylvia's cruelty.
Roberto Arti (ロベルト・アーティ, Roberuto Āti)
Voiced by: Kenji Akabane
Friede's personal knight. He later allies with Elizabeth when he can no longer aid Friede, but Elizabeth tells him that his betrayal towards her is unforgivable and he and everyone in Haldoria who betrayed her cannot stop their future retribution and also kills his men. He is given the salt on the wound that he is a disgracefully knight who holds no honor; he did not stop Friede being a tyrant and in the end, he even chose to commit treason. The reality check for being a false knight and now traitor causes him to attack Elizabeth, but he is defeated. Elizabeth alters his memories due to him being involved in Haldoria's attack against Yutear. He is given a hypnotic mark as he is given a role to be the ringing bell that marks the beginning of Elizabeth's revenge. His father also has his rankings stripped as punishment for his actions and no longer deems him a knight. Elizabeth's hex leads him to kill his own family and innocent people, resulting in his arrest and execution, but not before he realizes that Elizabeth is to blame for this.
Duke Sieg Leiston
Elizabeth's father, who betrays his own daughter despite being aware of Friede's actions.
Bulat Haldoria
The king of Haldoria ad Friede's father. Although he dislikes his son's cruelty, he is shown to be a dishonest man as he did not take much action against Friede's crimes and instead shrugged it off, meaning that he has also turned against Elizabeth. Bulat does not know that Friede is planning to overthrow him.
Ernest Arti
Roberto's father, who dislikes his son's dishonesty and has him stripped of his rankings for his foolish actions. After Elizabeth hexed Roberto into killing his own family and innocent people, he allows his son's execution.
Rowalize Arti
Roberto's younger sister. She is killed by Roberto while he was under Elizabeth's hex.
Anya
A maid who works for Roberto's family. She is killed by Roberto while he was under Elizabeth's hex.
Steil
One of Rozelia's servants.
Colt Lampton
One of the owners of the Funnel Commercial Firm. He is Marquess's son. He is arrested after Elizabeth thwarts his counterfeit scheme.
Marquess Lampton
Colt's father and one of the owners of the Funnel Commercial Firm. He is soon stripped of his position by Rozelia for his involvement in Colt's coutnerfeit scheme.
Belit
The owner of the Biot Commercial Firm, who works with Colt to take down Elizabeth. It is later revealed that he was working for Elizabeth all along after she bought his company.
Barl
A thug who works for Colt. He later betrays him after Elizabeth got him to side with her.

=== Kingdom of Sarjas ===
Grint
The prince of Sarjas, who became the next king after his father committed suicide for his involvement in the war against Yutear. He sided with Yutear because of this.
Zandra
The original ruler of Sarjas, who killed himself out of guilt for causing the war against Yutear and for trusting Friede.

=== Others ===
Melanie
A baroness who enters a partnership with Elizabeth during a party.
Chris
A merchant who trades with Haldoria. She has connections to Graham.
Graham
The leader of a group of rogue mercenaries, who helped Friede and the Kingdom of Sarjas in the war against Yutear. He has connections with Chris.
Arzeus Hammitt
A count who forms a partnership with Elizabeth. He owns a private beach.
Carella
Hammitt's wife, who admires Elizabeth's work.
Manilla
Hammitt's daughter, who also admires Elizabeth's work.
Million
The leader of a group of thugs whom Elizabeth hires to protect her company. He only accepts because he knows that it is unwise to mess with her.
Baron Lockit
Sylvia's cruel father. He is killed by Barl under Elizabeth's orders.

== Media ==
=== Light novel ===
Written by Metabo Hagure, the series began as a web novel on the online service Shōsetsuka ni Narō on October 6, 2020. After being one of the winners of the HJ Novel Award for the first half of 2021, Hobby Japan picked up the series for publishing under its HJ Novels imprint, with the first volume released on May 19, 2022. Eight volumes have been released as of July 2026. The series is licensed in English by J-Novel Club. During their panel at Anime Expo 2026, J-Novel Club announced that a print version would be released in November 2026.

No.	Original release date	Original ISBN	North American release date	North American ISBN
1	May 19, 2022	978-4-7986-2839-4	April 26, 2024 (digital); November 24, 2026 (print)	978-1-7183-8875-8 (digital); 978-1-7183-8668-6 (print)
2	September 20, 2022	978-4-7986-2929-2	July 12, 2024	978-1-7183-8877-2
3	January 19, 2023	978-4-7986-3051-9	September 27, 2024	978-1-7183-8879-6
4	July 19, 2023	978-4-7986-3208-7	December 27, 2024	978-1-7183-8881-9
5	January 19, 2024	978-4-7986-3369-5	March 12, 2025	978-1-7183-8883-3
6	November 19, 2024	978-4-7986-3678-8	May 21, 2025	978-1-7183-8885-7
7	August 19, 2025	978-4-7986-3932-1	May 13, 2026	978-1-7183-8887-1
8	July 17, 2026	978-4-7986-4220-8	—	—

=== Manga ===
A manga adaptation illustrated by Imo Ōno began serialization on Hobby Japan's Comic Fire service on May 19, 2022. Eleven tankōbon volumes have been released as of September 2026. The manga adaptation is also licensed in English by J-Novel Club.

No.	Original release date	Original ISBN	North American release date	North American ISBN
1	February 1, 2023	978-4-7986-3076-2	February 14, 2024	978-1-7183-7006-7
2	June 30, 2023	978-4-7986-3174-5	May 29, 2024	978-1-7183-7007-4
3	December 1, 2023	978-4-7986-3330-5	September 4, 2024	978-1-7183-7008-1
4	April 1, 2024	978-4-7986-3496-8	June 4, 2025	978-1-7183-7009-8
5	September 2, 2024	978-4-7986-3542-2	September 10, 2025	978-1-7183-7010-4
6	December 2, 2024	978-4-7986-3681-8	December 17, 2025	978-1-7183-7011-1
7	April 1, 2025	978-4-7986-3811-9	March 25, 2026	978-1-7183-7012-8
8	September 1, 2025	978-4-7986-3912-3	July 1, 2026	978-1-7183-7013-5
9	December 27, 2025	978-4-7986-4020-4	—	—
10	March 2, 2026	978-4-7986-4121-8	—	—
11	July 1, 2026	978-4-7986-4196-6	—	—
12	September 1, 2026	978-4-7986-4263-5	—	—

=== Anime ===
An anime adaptation was announced on August 18, 2025, which was later confirmed to be a television series produced by Studio Comet and directed by Naoyuki Kuzuya, with Mitsutaka Hirota handling series composition, Sayaka Anezaki designing the characters and Satoshi Hōno and Karin Nakano composing the music. The series premiere from July 6 to September 21, 2026, on AT-X and other networks. The opening theme song is "Q.E.D.", performed by Yui Ogura, while the ending theme song is "Goodbye Lullaby" (グッバイ・ララバイ, Gubbai・Rarabai), performed by Aguri Ōnishi. Remow licensed the series for streaming on Crunchyroll.

==== Episodes ====
No.	Title	Original release date
1	"Despair and a Promise of Revenge"; Transliteration: "Zetsubō to Hōfuku no Chikai" (Japanese: 絶望と報復の誓い)	July 6, 2026
Elizabeth Leiston, daughter of the Kingdom of Haldoria's chancellor, is a political, martial, and magical prodigy betrothed to the country's prince, Friede Haldoria, whilst being entrusted with some of its administrative tasks. Aware that Friede is having an affair with the recently ennobled Sylvia Lockit, who is secretly cheating on him herself, Elizabeth confronts and warns her against disgracing the royal family. Unfortunately, Sylvia promptly tricks Friede into cancelling his engagement to Elizabeth by falsely claiming she tried to assassinate her, leading to her being imprisoned. Nonetheless, she continues her duties from her cell while waiting for things to be resolved, until her maid, Mireille Katarina, informs her that the public fully believes the false story about her and even King Bulat and her own father, Duke Sieg Leiston, have turned their backs on her. With Elizabeth having reached her breaking point, Mireille persuades her to flee with her. After escaping her cell, Elizabeth approaches Lucas Lebrick, an ambassador from the neighboring Yutear Empire, and requests asylum, plotting to destroy the Kingdom of Haldoria as revenge.
2	"Starting Business in Asylum"; Transliteration: "Bōmei to Kigyō" (Japanese: 亡命と起業)	July 13, 2026
Lucas escorts Elizabeth through Yutear as she begins her plans for revenge, but she doesn't plan to target Haldoria directly. Elizabeth shows Lucas her grimoire and explain its capabilities. She then provides Lucas with a magic contract that states that should she not pay her rent in time, she will be sold into slavery and Lucas gets full ownership of her trading company. Using the alias Ellie Leis as a front, she and Mireille move into an old building that they use to establish their trading company, naming it the Traitre Commercial Firm. Elizabeth visits the Church of Libris where she meets Luis, the head priest, who also runs an orphanage. She donates money to help support his business. She also continues to make money by selling soap, lotion, and shampoo. Meanwhile, a merchant named Gazaru Jackman grows jealous of Elizabeth's business and plans to sabotage her. Grantz, one of his men, informs them about the formula to Elizabeth's soap products after overhearing Ellie and Mireille talk about it. He plans to steal the formula. Meanwhile, Elizabeth learns that Friede and Sylvia are engaged, and Sieg has placed a bounty on her. A woman named Arte Hilgardie, who works for the Merchants' Guild legal department, arrives to interrogate her after claiming that her soap has toxins in them. Elizabeth explains that her products have no toxins and that someone is trying to steal her formula and replicate her soap, but that was only half of the formula and Elizabeth has the other half; without both halves, the soap would end up toxic. Seeing Elizabeth's innocence, Arte leaves. Arte next visits Jackman, having figured that it was he who stole Elizabeth's formula, but couldn't perfect the soap since he only had half. After he is arrested and interrogated by Elizabeth, Luis arrives to punish Jackman for his crimes.
3	"Met on the Road"; Transliteration: "Tabiji de no Deai" (Japanese: 旅路での出会い)	July 20, 2026
Elizabeth requests custody of Jackman's company, but Arte also reveals that Grantz manipulated Jackman into doing this in the first place. Elizabeth summons Grantz and instead of punishing him, she hires him to work for her; it was Elizabeth who got Grantz to make Jackman try and sabotage her in the first place so she can expand her business. Elizabeth visits Grantz's house and learns that his daughter Lunoa is injured and Grantz was working to try and save her. Elizabeth heals Lunoa with her magic, and Grantz and his family agree to not tell anyone about her magic. After a month, Lucas is amazed by how much money Elizabeth made, but he also explains that Haldoria is hunting her. Elizabeth had also hired Lunoa to work as her apprentice, as Lunoa has a special skill that can analyze products. After half a year, Elizabeth plans to expand her business to the capital and has Grantz and his assistant Stia help her. A few days later, Elizabeth, Mireille, and Lunoa travel to the capital, but are confronted by bandits. Elizabeth quickly kills them. They come across a nun named Tida, who is also on her way to the capital and they give her a lift. Elziabeth and Tida also tell Lunoa how bandits are formed due to the land's ruler's poor decisions. Elizabeth and Tida defeat another group of bandits. Tida explains that she sees bandits as monsters and shows no mercy towards them. At a tavern, Tida quickly bonds with Elizabeth. Meanwhile, Friede and Sylvia refuse to help the poor in Haldoria and only care about each other. A woman watches them from a distance.
4	"New Friends and Social Parties"; Transliteration: "Aratana Nakama to Shakō Patī" (Japanese: 新たな仲間と社交パーティー)	July 27, 2026
During their trip to the capital, Lunoa learns how to pilot the carriage. Tida parts ways with them upon arrival. Lunoa feels bothered staying in a fancy hotel room, but Elizabeth explains that it is necessary. They then meet Arnauld Langley, who works at Elizabeth's company. Elizabeth rents a property in the capital. When Mireille suggests getting more servants, Elizabeth decides to hire slaves, though Lunoa feels uncomfortable with slavery. They meet the owner of a slave establishment, Cedric Luins, who knows Elizabeth and her background. Elizabeth sees that slaves are given education in this slave company. They meet Misha Tail, a foxgirl slave that Elizabeth decides to hire and Cedric removes her slave marker, though Misha struggles with learning how to handle her new job. Elizabeth is then invited to a party hosted by a baroness named Melanie, where the other women being to admire Elizabeth, who enters a partnership with Melanie. Later, while making a delivery, Elizabeth sees Tida being attacked by thugs for scamming them at gambling, but she quickly defeats them and greets Elizabeth and Mireille before leaving. Back in Haldoria, Sieg learns from Rosaria, the woman who was spying on Friede and Sylvia earlier, about what was going on in the kingdom while having her serve as Elizabeth's replacement as Sieg also deems Elizabeth a traitor. Elizabeth learns from Lucas that Yutear's king will be watching her from now on as Elizabeth continues her plans for revenge against Haldoria.
5	"Adventurers Assemble"; Transliteration: "Bōken-sha Shūketsu" (Japanese: 冒険者集結)	August 3, 2026
Friede and Sylvia are still spending time with each other, which is a problem for Bulat and Sieg, who are still searching for Elizabeth and have to deem Sylvia as the next crown princess. However, Rosaria is resolving the situation in Haldoria. Friede is mistreating the knights, who are not happy with being forced to lose every fight with him. Sylvia refuses to learn how to be a crown princess and gets Friede to help defend her from her teachers. The two then meet a woman named Chris, who has brought gifts for them. Chris suggests a military accomplishment and Friede gets the idea to stage an attack on the Yutear Empire. Rosaria visits them, feeling a little annoyed with having to do all the hard work for Friede. She demands that Friede handles some work and also reprimands Sylvia. Friede decides to modify his duties to his own likings. Back in Yutear, Elizabeth's group had made plans to travel to Sirona village and plans to make the nobles there either ally with her or face punishment. After learning that the Kingdom of Sarjas, a portion of Haldoria, has launched an attack on Yutear, Elizabeth discovers that Sirona village is in the middle of the battlefield, but also learns that Yutear originally took some of the land from Sarjas in the past. Lucas is already going into battle. Broccen Fortress, a fortress that defends Yutear, has fallen due to some powerful mercenaries helping the enemy. Knowing that this will hinder her plans, Elizabeth decides to join the battle and sends Lunoa and Misha to deliver some letters to the Adventurers' Guild, but is also suspicious of the opposing forces. Sergio, the guild's owner, agrees to aid Elizabeth and sends his assistant Sarasa to help Lunoa and Misha recruit a group of female adventurers called the Sharp Edge to join the battle. Lisa, one of the members, realizes that her hometown is close to the battlefield. Their leader Elsa agrees to help. The next day, the Sharp Edge and four other groups join Elizabeth for war and Elizabeth demonstrates her powers by using her grimoire. The five parties agree to keep this a secret. Marty, a member of the Sharp Edge, is suspicious of Elizabeth, but the others assure him otherwise. Elizabeth further helps the group by creating a wall around their camp. Marty returns from a scouting mission and reveals that a nearby village is under attack. The group prepare to take action.
6	"Taking Back the Fortress"; Transliteration: "Toride, Dakkan Sakusen" (Japanese: 砦、奪還作戦)	August 10, 2026
Elizabeth puts her plan to take down the enemy in motion while also intending to finish setting up camp. After interrogating one of the enemy soldiers, they learn that the soldiers work for Haldoria and that Friede is responsible for the attack, as he is forcing Sarjas to aid him. They also learn that the men in the nearby village were killed while the women and children are imprisoned. Elizabeth realizes that this will make Yutear wage war on Sarjas. The captured soldier claims that he wants to help them, but Elizabeth instead kills him as she senses that he is bluffing. After taking down two more enemy soldiers, they learn more about the mercenaries helping the enemy and the status of the Broccen Fortress. Elizabeth leaves the surviving soldier to be killed by vengeful women for killing their husbands/fathers. A doctor named Ygul joins the team and he tells Elizabeth about Friede's actions. Elizabeth plans to help take back the Broccen Fortress. Meanwhile, Lunoa and Misha are handling Elizabeth's trading company while Elizabeth is away. Elizabeth meets up Lucas to begin their plan to reclaim the fortress. Elizabeth and Elsa start by raiding the fortress to take down the enemy soldiers and rescue the captured villagers. Elsa is overwhelmed by the mercenaries, but she manages to defeat them using her divine artifact. Elizabeth fights the mercenary leader, but he escapes with Prince Grint of the Sarjas Kingdom. Nevertheless, the group manage to take back to fortress and begin their plan to invade Sarjas, but Sarjas surprisingly surrenders. After learning that Robert, a knight who works for Haldoria, is among them, Elizabeth decides to meet him.
7	"Revenge in the Dead of Night"; Transliteration: "Yamiyo no Hōfuku" (Japanese: 闇夜の報復)	August 17, 2026
Robert tells Elizabeth about Friede's plan, which he no longer wants to be a part of. Meanwhile, back at Sarjas Castle, Friede is disgusted by Grint's failure to secure the fortress. After learning about Robert's surrender, Friede decides to return to Haldoria, leaving Grint to take the fall, even though all of this was Friede's doing in the first place. With Robert's help, Elizabeth's group make plans to conquer Sarjas' capital. Robert and Elizabeth reconcile regarding Robert's past mistakes towards Elizabeth. Back in Sarjas Castle, King Zandra decides to surrender to the capital despite the fact that Haldoria is responsible for this. Feeling guilt-ridden by his mistake in trusting Friede and for being a major part of this war, Zandra commits suicide and Grint goes to see Lucas and Elizabeth to confess the surrender, also showing them Zandra's head as proof. They accept his surrender and Grint agrees to show them proof of Friede's involvement when an explosion sets Sarjas Castle on fire, which was caused by the merchants to destroy the evidence. The group help Grint put out the fire and Elizabeth learns more about the mercenaries from Grint, suspecting that they caused the fire to eliminate the evidence. Elizabeth decides to return to the empire before Lucas, bringing the surrendered soldiers and Robert with her. While stopping to rest for the night, Elizabeth reveals her powers to Robert, but also kills his men as her quest for vengeance against Haldoria remains unchanged. She then proceeds to alter Robert's memories.
8	"The Tragedy of the House of Count Arty"; Transliteration: "Āti Hakushaku-ka no Higeki" (Japanese: アーティ伯爵家の悲劇)	August 24, 2026
At Haldoria's border, a traveler finds an exhausted Robert. Elizabeth returns home and reunites with Misha, Lunoa, and Mireille, who finds her arm burned after altering Robert's memories. In a flashback, Friede tricked Robert into helping him denounce Elizabeth during the party, though Robert's father Ernest is displeased with his son's actions. Back in the present, Robert wakes up in his estate where a maid named Anya informs his younger sister Rowalize, his mother, and Ernest of his recovery. Ernest is mad at his son for his actions as has him stripped of his ranking, declaring him no longer a knight, but is still glad that he is okay. After recovering, Robert decides to go back to training so he can restart his career; however, he starts to remember what happened earlier. Under a hex that Elizabeth placed on him earlier, he unwillingly kills Rowalize, Anya, his mother, and the rest of the maids in his estate before proceeding to slaughter innocent people, leading to his arrest. Bulat, Sieg, and Ernest reveal that they know that Elizabeth got framed, but they use it to brush off Friede and Robert's wrongdoings at the party and sentence Robert to the death penalty. In another flashback, Robert struggled to defeat Elizabeth in sword combat before being approached by Sylvia. Returning to the present, Friede visits Robert and is disgusted by his betrayal, even though it wasn't his doing. Friede questions Sylvia about her past relationship with Robert, who is later executed for murder, but not before Robert finally realizes that Elizabeth is the one who arranged for this to happen; he is not able to inform the others of this before his death. Meanwhile, Elizabeth learns of Robert's death, and Cedric works with a mysterious man to evaluate Elizabeth, both unaware of her true identity. Lucas learns of Robert's actions and that this was Elizabeth's doing. Lucas later informs Elizabeth that Sarjas is now a part of the empire. Elizabeth explains her plans for revenge.
9	"The Empire's Merchants' Guild Council"; Transliteration: "Teikoku Girudo Hyōgi-kai" (Japanese: 帝国ギルド評議会)	August 31, 2026
Elizabeth is scheduled to get a special merchant license and is invited to take part in the upcoming Merchants' Council meeting to prove her skills. Elizabeth later receives a flower that allows her to create a new type of perfume, which she intends to show to the Council. They also learn that businesses have been failing in the empire, so Elizabeth attempts to resolve this problem using the perfume. Elizabeth goes to attend the meeting and meets Cedric, who brings her to see the Council. Count Albert Guide, the owner of the empire's largest trading company and the mysterious man that Cedric spoke with earlier, has Elizabeth demonstrate her business and she shows them all the perfume. Council members Darc Hokins and Lotton Flywok are distrustful of her while Yuuka Kusunoki and Gaien Drafan don't want to be involved in this decision; Hilde Callard is the only one who accepts Elizabeth. Albert eventually agrees to give Elizabeth her license. After learning of shady rumors of the empire treating other countries like Sarjas as pawns going on, Elizabeth suspects this to be the work of Sieg and Rosaria and intends to counter this. Meanwhile, Rosaria is getting annoyed with the bills that Friede is sending her and refuses to pay them for him. She also learns about another rumor that is countering the one that she spread, which she suspects to be Elizabeth's doing. Back at the empire, Elizabeth has made plans to sell nail polish to beastkin due to how poor their sales have been to them, but with some alternations so they won't be bothered by the nail polishes' smells. Elizabeth and Mireille also have Misha and Lunoa learn how to fight to defend themselves. Elizabeth soon learns that Rosaria had stopped her rumor, but she is not finished yet.
10	"By The Sea"; Transliteration: "Umibe Nite" (Japanese: 海辺にて)	September 7, 2026
Sometime after training, Lunoa desires to be more help to Elizabeth as she wishes to be a merchant like her father. Elizabeth decides to have her help with negotiations with Arzeus Hammitt. Upon arriving at Hammitt's estate, they are told to wait for Hammitt, though Lunoa feels nervous about meeting him. After Elizabeth assures her, Hammitt arrives to greet them. He wishes to form an allegiance with Elizabeth's company. She agrees and is also interested in using a nearby harbor to help expand her business. After giving Hammitt a gift, Elizabeth later receives her license from Albert, though she is also warned that she will be watched more closely as Albert is curious about her origins. Elizabeth, Lunoa, Misha, and Mireille travel to the harbor where they meet Hammitt again, who has Elizabeth sign a contract. Hammitt then introduces his wife Carella and daughter Manilla to Elizabeth. Lunoa gives them the new perfume as a present. Elizabeth's group later go to get something to eat. They later encounter some thugs, whom Misha easily defeats. Elizabeth forces the surviving member to take them to his boss. Arriving at their hideout, they meet the leader: Million, whom Elizabeth wishes to hire for protection, warning her of what will happen if he refuses. Million is eventually convinced to accept her offer. Elizabeth explains to Lunoa that she needs to act tough in her job as a merchant. Back in Haldoria, Friede and Sylvia are given gifts from Chris, who later visits Graham, the mercenary leader from earlier, at a bar to explain what happened during the war in Sarjas. Graham tells her about Elizabeth, though he doesn't know her identity, and has Chris keep an eye on her. Meanwhile, two mysterious men are also up to something. Later, Elizabeth's group visit Hammitt's private beach with Manilla and Carella. Elizabeth gives Carella a new type of cream that allows skin protection.
11	"False Gold"; Transliteration: "Itsuwari no Kinka" (Japanese: 偽りの金貨)	September 14, 2026
Friede and Sylvia are still expressing their love for each other, but are not happy that their servants aren't complying to their demands. Rosaria is still handling paperwork, but is growing frustrated with Friede. Back at Elizabeth's company, Elizabeth and her friends discover fake gold coins, suspecting that this will threaten various kingdoms. As they set off to inform the Merchants' guild, they meet Tida again, who unknowingly has some of the fake gold that she got from cheating at gambling. After informing Albert, he agrees to have the guild investigate while Elizabeth conducts her own investigation. Elizabeth soon learns that a company in Haldoria called Funnel Commercial Firm, operated by a prince named Colt Lampton and his father Marquess, is responsible for this and Colt is working for Friede. Meanwhile, Colt and his thuggish subordinate Barl, the two mysterious men from before, plot their next move. Elizabeth turns to Lucas for help. Meanwhile, Friede and Colt plan to overthrow Bulat. Lucas attends a party hosted by Friede and requests a deal with him. Colt meets with Marquess, who warns him to not trust Friede. Colt then goes to see Maverick, a clerk who works for Elizabeth, who claims that Elizabeth wishes to work with Funnel before leaving. Suspicious of this, Colt has his subordinate investigate Elizabeth's company. Bulat and Sieg are annoyed with Friede's actions while Elizabeth puts her plan in motion. Barl informs him of his discoveries, but cannot find any information on Elizabeth; however, he does know that she is making a decoy trading company. Colt is then visited by Belit, the owner of the Biot Commercial Firm, who decides to work with him to take down Elizabeth's company. Following a tip from Barl, Colt decides to attend a meeting with Elizabeth despite being warned that it may be a trap in hopes of revealing the truth behind Elizabeth's company. Elizabeth is preparing to finish her scheme as she heads to the meeting.
12	"A Livid Lady's Revenge Never Ends"; Transliteration: "Buchigire Reijō no Hōfuku wa Owaranai" (Japanese: ブチ切れ令嬢の報復は終わらない)	September 21, 2026
Colt meets with Maverick, revealing he already knows about Elizabeth's plan through Belit and has brought guards to subdue her. However, when Elizabeth enters after Maverick calls her, she reveals that Belit was actually working for her and the guards have already been subdued. Even Colt's subordinate, Barl, has sided with Elizabeth. Elizabeth then reveals that a clause in the economic pact Lucas signed with Friede allows the Empire to investigate the Kingdom for counterfeiting; thus, Colt is arrested. Some time later, Bulat learns about the counterfeiting and, with the Empire demanding compensation for the damages, refuses to cover for Friede anymore; thus, Bulat strips Friede of his status. Rosaria also fires Marquess for remaining silent despite knowing about the counterfeiting. With her relationship with Friede beginning to break as he becomes an alcoholic, Sylvia attempts to move back in with her family. However, Elizabeth anticipated this and initiated a rebellion in Sylvia's family's domain before having Barl kill them, forcing her to stay with the increasingly unstable Friede. Afterward, however, Barl and Rosaria, who has deduced that Elizabeth masterminded all these events, both individually voice their concern about how far Elizabeth's revenge will go.

== Reception ==
Reviewing the first volume of the light novel for Anime News Network, Rebecca Silverman gave it a score of 2.5/5 stars, saying, "For every justified act, there are another two that go too far, and I think that revenge needs to suit the original slight if we're going to get behind it. If you're of a different opinion and enjoy your ladies drenched in blood and violence as well as hypercompetent, you'll probably like this more than I did."

Lauren Orsini, also of Anime News Network, was more critical. She gave it a score of 0.5/5 stars and said, "It's a blatant power fantasy, and Ellie is out for blood. In other words, the protagonist is a complete psychopath. She has more power than God, and rather than using it to do anything good in this world, she chooses to make hundreds of people suffer. And when you consider that this is all in retaliation for her ex-fiancee humiliating her at a party, the punishment does not fit the crime."

== See also ==
- The Too-Perfect Saint, another light novel series with the same illustrator
