= Eco-Soap Bank =

American nonprofit organization

Eco-Soap Bank is an American non-profit organization founded in Pittsburgh, Pennsylvania in 2014. The organization collects used soap from hotels located in Cambodia, employs economically disadvantaged women to sanitize and process the soap into new bars at local hubs, and partners with other organizations to distribute the soap to schools, communities, and health clinics. Eco-Soap Bank also provides some soap to women in village communities and trains them as soap sellers.

== About ==
Eco-Soap Bank was founded by social entrepreneur Samir Lakhani in 2014. While on a volunteer trip to Cambodia building fish ponds in remote villages, Lakhani saw a woman bathing her infant in laundry detergent, a hazardous substitute for soap. After learning more about hygiene issues in the developing world, he contacted scientist friends and developed a technique to melt down, sterilize, and reprocess recycled soap bars into new composite bars of “eco-soap.”

Eco-Soap Bank now employs 30 staff in several locations across Cambodia. The organization is working to expand its reach to other developing countries with high mortality rates associated with hygiene-related illnesses.

== Mission ==
Eco-Soap Bank’s stated mission is to fight the spread of preventable illnesses caused by a lack of access to soap, to reduce the waste generated by the hotel industry, and to provide livelihoods to economically disadvantaged women.
