= Pupil premium =

Fund given to schools in England and Wales for disadvantaged pupils

The pupil premium is a grant given by the government to schools in England to decrease the attainment gap for the most disadvantaged children, whether by income or by family upheaval. For each pupil who is eligible for free school meals, or has claimed free school meals in the last six years, their school receives £1,345 (if a primary school) or £955 (if a secondary school).

Schools receive an extra premium of £2,345 for pupils:

- in local authority care
- adopted from care (and the parent self-declares)
- were in care in the last year, which ceased by virtue of a special guardianship order (and the guardian self-declares), residence order or Child Arrangement Order.

Service children also receive an allocation of £310, if a parent is serving in the armed forces or is in receipt of a service pension.

The pupil premium was in the 2010 Liberal Democrat manifesto and it was introduced in 2011 by the Conservative—Liberal Democrat coalition government, with the Liberal Democrats being the primary advocate for it, at £488 per pupil. It increased to £600 per pupil in 2012–13 and eligibility was extended to pupils who have been eligible for free school meals at any point in the last six years (known as the 'Ever 6' Free School Meals measure).

== Disadvantaged pupils ==
Disadvantaged pupils are defined by Ofsted as those who were eligible for free school meals (FSM) at any time during the last 6 years and children looked after (in the care of the local authority for a day or more or who have been adopted from care).

== Audit ==
Schools in receipt of the pupil premium grant are required to account for its use and report this on their websites, and with specific reference to how it is used to help disadvantaged pupils, as part of the OFSTED inspection framework. Ofsted will recommend that a school should conduct an independent pupil premium review if, as a result of a section 5 inspection, it has identified specific issues regarding the provision for disadvantaged pupils.

== Effectiveness ==
The Department for Education published an evaluation of the introduction of the pupil premium by the University of Manchester and Newcastle University in 2013 which reviewed how schools were identifying and targeting disadvantaged pupils for support.

The think tank Demos published an analysis in January 2015. They claim that, since 2011, for free school meals-eligible pupils, whose number has grown significantly, the attainment gap has widened, whereas it has narrowed for those in local authority care. It noted the number of free school meal-eligible pupils who achieved 5 GCSEs (including English and Mathematics) at grades A*-C was 33.7%, compared to 60.7% for non-eligible students (as at the first-round Summer 2014 results); with lower relative attainment by 27 percent of such students. It added the gap widened by 0.3% since 2013. This follows a similar widening in its previous report. However it noted in the same period overall attainment has increased significantly.

The Department for Education has disputed Demos' analysis, its spokesman stating: "It is nonsense to say that the attainment gap is widening. The 2014 results – when analysed with our more informative and accurate measure – show the gap has narrowed by almost 4 per cent since 2012, the year after the pupil premium was introduced." The Sutton Trust reviewed the impact of the introduction of the pupil premium in 2015.
