= Prohibited Steps Order =

A Prohibited Steps Order is a court order in the United Kingdom common in divorce and separation cases. An example of where a Prohibited Steps Order might be applied for is to prevent one parent from taking a child out of the country.

== See also ==
- Child Arrangement Order
- Parental Responsibility Order
