= O Monstro Precisa de Amigos =

Studio album by Ornatos Violeta
- Released: 22 November 1999
- Genre: Alternative rock
- Length: 48:30
- Label: Polydor; Universal Music Portugal; Rastilho Records
- Producer: Mário Barreiros

Ornatos Violeta chronology
Cão! (1997)	O Monstro Precisa de Amigos (1999)

Singles from O Monstro Precisa de Amigos
- 1. "Ouvi Dizer"; 2. "Capitão Romance"; 3. "Chaga"

O Monstro Precisa de Amigos is the second studio album by Portuguese band Ornatos Violeta, released on 22 November 1999 by Polydor. Two music videos were filmed, for the songs "Ouvi Dizer" and "Capitão Romance".

== Recording and production ==
The recording of Ornatos' second studio album was a difficult one. The band rejected "dozens of songs" during the album's development sessions with producer Mário Barreiros, with the band's members becoming so frustrated that they expressed a sudden desire of giving up on the project completely after just two months of production. Some of these rejected songs, such as "Como Afundar", "Há-de Encarnar", "Rio de Raiva" and "Devagar" were later included in the 2011 release of a CD box containing both studio albums and a third CD, named Inéditos/Raridades, with previously unreleased songs.

Years later, Barreiros said he had identified that frustration as merely the "permanent insatisfaction of the great artists" that allowed them to push their art further away.

== Composition ==
O Monstro Precisa de Amigos is noted to be a much more mature and versatile album than the band's debut Cão!, offering a more meditative and polished sound.

For their second album, the band could count with the guest participation of Gordon Gano of Violent Femmes and Portuguese musician and actor Vítor Espadinha. The Violent Femmes were a long-time reference for Ornatos, and their lead singer Gano shared vocal duties with Manel Cruz in the single "Capitão Romance", in which he sang in Portuguese. Espadinha contributed with the recitation of a poem that can be heard at the end of "Ouvi Dizer", another of the album's singles which has been called a "post-modern classic" by some media outlets.

== Reception ==
The album was considered by the Portuguese music magazine Blitz as the best album of the year in 1999, with Cruz being awarded the best vocalist prize and Ornatos Violeta the best Portuguese ensemble of that year. O Monstro Precisa de Amigos had sold 15 586 copies as of October 2002, which allowed the album to be certified as a silver record in Portugal.

Years later, the album is considered to have turned Ornatos Violeta into one of the most successful rock bands in Portugal. In June 2017, the album was included in Blitz's list of the 30 best Portuguese albums of the last 30 years.

To signal the band's 20 years anniversary, O Monstro Precisa de Amigos was re-released on 5 December 2011 along with Cão! and a CD with previously unreleased work. This CD box release was certified as a platinum record in Portugal.

O Monstro Precisa de Amigos was released for the first time as a vinyl record on 5 February 2012, with Rastilho Records providing a limited and numbered edition of 500 copies of both O Monstro and Cão!.

== Track listing ==
No.	Title	Writer(s)	Length
1.	"Tanque"	Ornatos Violeta	4:05
2.	"Chaga"	Manel Cruz; Peixe	3:04
3.	"Dia Mau"	Manel Cruz	2:54
4.	"Para Nunca Mais Mentir"	Manel Cruz	3:06
5.	"Ouvi Dizer" (featuring Vítor Espadinha)	Manel Cruz	3:52
6.	"Capitão Romance (Aventuras No Mundo, Cap. I - Rumo À Verdade)" (featuring Gordon Gano)	Manel Cruz; Peixe	3:51
7.	"Pára de Olhar Para Mim"	Manel Cruz	3:31
8.	"O.M.E.M. (Operação Minimização Do Ego Maximizado)"	Manel Cruz	4:01
9.	"Coisas"	Manel Cruz; Kinörm	5:57
10.	"Nuvem"	Manel Cruz	2:48
11.	"Deixa Morrer"	Manel Cruz; Peixe	3:40
12.	"Notícias do Fundo"	Manel Cruz	4:45
13.	"Fim da Canção"	Manel Cruz	3:07
Total length:			48:30

== Personnel ==
The following people are credited on the album:

Performance credits

- Manel Cruz – vocals and guitar (tracks 1, 4, 10, 12, 13)
- Elísio Donas – piano and keyboards
- Kinörm – drums
- Peixe – guitar
- Nuno Prata – bass

Other credits

- Mário Barreiros - production, recording and mixing
- Nelson Carvalho - mixing
- Manel Cruz – album cover illustration
- Jorge Fidalgo - piano technical assistance
- Mandy Parnell - mastering
