= Parental Responsibility Order =

A Parental Responsibility Order is a court order in the United Kingdom that is granted in order to confer parental responsibility upon an individual. Their statutory basis is the Children Act 1989 s4(1).

== See also ==
- Prohibited Steps Order
- Child Arrangement Order
