= Bug Films =

Japanese animation studio

Bug Films, Inc.
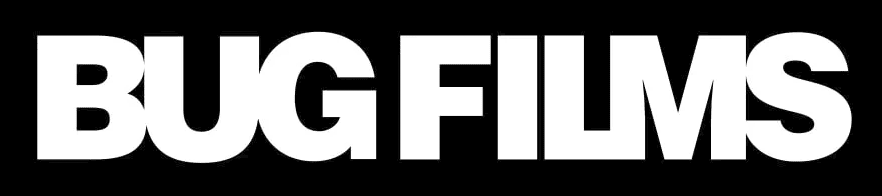

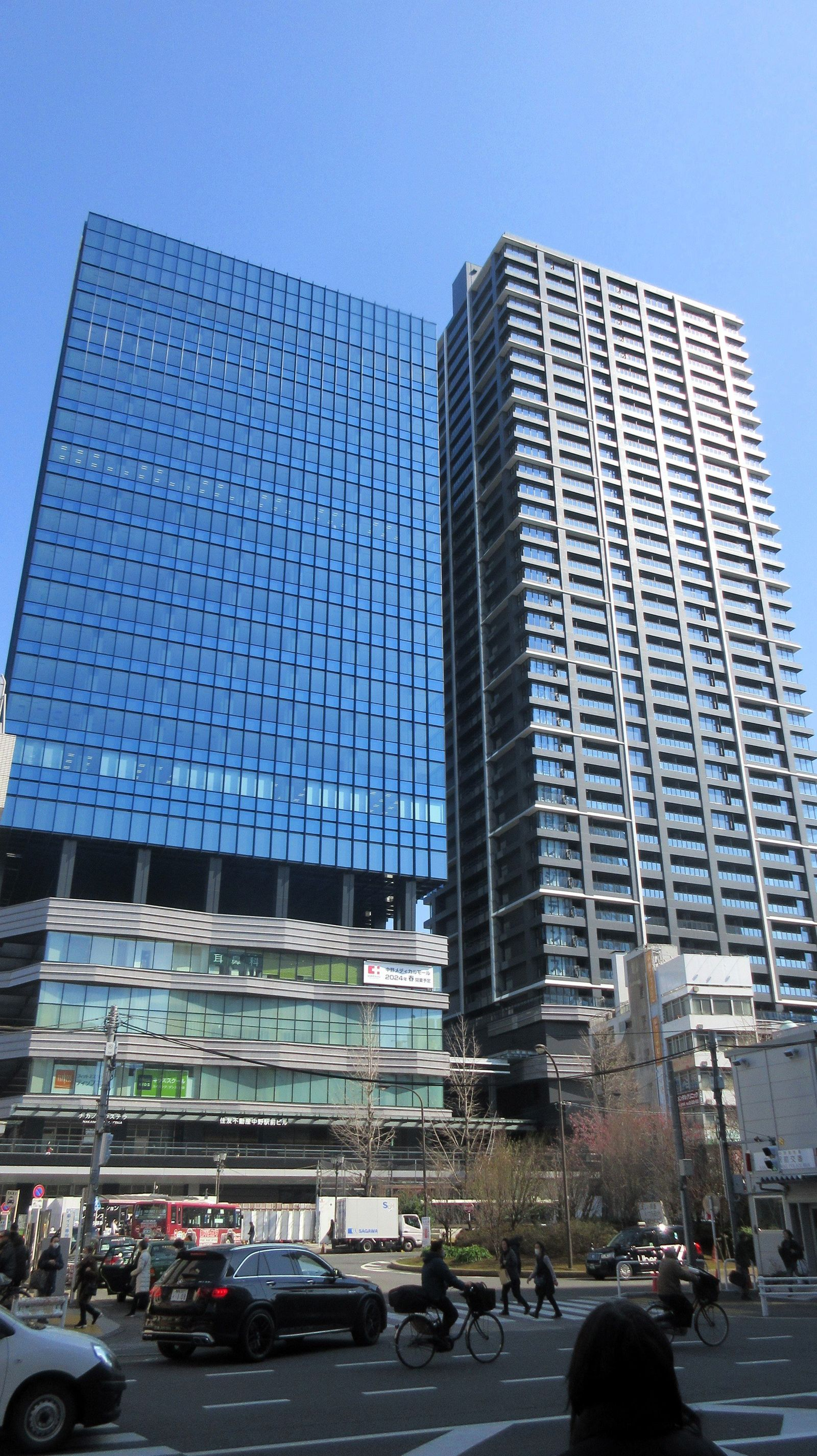
- Headquarters in Nakano, Tokyo
- Native name: 株式会社バグフィルム
- Romanized name: Kabushiki-gaisha Bagu Firumu
- Type: Kabushiki gaisha
- Industry: Japanese animation
- Predecessor: OLM Team Kojima
- Founded: September 22, 2021; 4 years ago
- Headquarters: Nakano, Tokyo, Japan
- Key people: Hiroaki Kojima (CEO); Satoshi Nakano (director); Kazuki Kawagoe (director); Kazuki Shibuki (director)
- Total equity: ¥ 9,000,000
- Owner: Twin Engine
- Number of employees: 47 (as of February 2026)
- Website: www.bugfilms.jp

Bug Films, Inc. (株式会社バグフィルム, Kabushiki-gaisha Bagu Firumu) is a Japanese animation studio based in Nakano, Tokyo. Established on September 22, 2021, by former members of OLM, it is a subsidiary of Twin Engine.

== History ==
Bug Films was established in September 2021 by Hiroaki Kojima, a former producer at OLM where he produced the anime adaptations for Mix, Major 2nd, and Komi Can't Communicate.

Kojima explained that he founded the studio in order to "create work worthy of the viewer." The studio's founding also contributes to Twin Engine's long-term goal of "strengthening its production pipeline in an effort to achieve global expansion."

== List of works ==
=== Anime television series ===
Title	Director(s)	First run start date	First run end date	Eps	Note(s)	Ref(s)
Zom 100: Bucket List of the Dead	Kazuki Kawagoe	July 9, 2023	December 26, 2023	12	Based on a comedy horror manga by Haro Aso.	
Witch Hat Atelier	Ayumu Watanabe	April 6, 2026	June 22, 2026	13	Based on a fantasy manga by Kamome Shirahama.	
Witch Hat Atelier Season 2	TBA	TBA	TBA	TBA	Sequel to Witch Hat Atelier.	

=== Cooperative works ===
- Komi Can't Communicate (2021, as OLM Team Kojima)
- Summer Time Rendering (2022, as OLM Team Kojima)
- Pretty Cure All Stars F (2023, with Toei Animation)
- Doraemon: Nobita's Earth Symphony (2024, with Shin-Ei Animation)
- Mononoke the Movie: Phantom in the Rain (2024, with EOTA)
