= Ornatos Violeta =

Portuguese alternative rock band

- Origin: Porto, Portugal
- Genres: Alternative rock, funk rock, jazz fusion, ska punk
- Years active: 1991–2002, 2012, 2018–present
- Members: Manel Cruz; Nuno Prata; Peixe; Kinörm
- Past members: Ricardo Almeida; Elísio Donas

Ornatos Violeta are a Portuguese rock band from Porto. The band, often referred to simply as Ornatos, consists of vocalist Manel Cruz, bassist Nuno Prata, guitarist Peixe and drummer Kinörm. Elísio Donas was the band's keyboardist until his death in 2023.

Their main period of activity was between 1991 and 2002. Since then, the band has reunited twice: in 2012, when they played a few concerts across Portugal, and in 2018. This last reunion remains active as of 2023.

Ornatos Violeta, whose music is influenced by funk, jazz and ska, grew over the years to become a reference of Portuguese music of the late 1990s. The band has released two albums: Cão! in 1997 and O Monstro Precisa de Amigos in 1999, both highly acclaimed by the Portuguese press.

== History ==
In 1997, Ornatos Violeta released their first album Cão! (Dog!), which included the song "Letra S", a duet with Manuela Azevedo, vocalist of Portuguese band Clã. In the following year, during the Expo 98, they collaborated on the compilation Tejo Beat alongside Boss AC, Blasted Mechanism, Zen and Flood with the song "Tempo de Nascer".

Their second and last album, O Monstro Precisa de Amigos (The Monster Needs Friends) was released in 1999, with a more carefully thought production and a more mellow style. The album contained the singles "Ouvi Dizer", a duet with Portuguese musician Vitor Espadinha, and "Capitão Romance", with Gordon Gano, vocalist of the American band Violent Femmes. During 1999 they helped to produce XX Anos XX Bandas, a tribute to the Portuguese band Xutos & Pontapés, with a cover their song "Circo de Feras".

After some speculation about their future, Ornatos Violeta split up in 2002. The band members went on to work independently on several other projects in the following decade, while a cult following started to grow around Ornatos, in particular around the work of Manel Cruz, author of most of the lyrics, and protagonist of newer projects such as Pluto, Foge Foge Bandido and SuperNada.

In honor of the 10 years since their last concert, and taking into account the consolidation of their status as a cult band, the group decided to reunite and schedule a series of celebration concerts, that took place during the year of 2012. The band performed seven shows, which were at the time promoted as being their last. The first was at Paredes de Coura Festival, three shows in the Coliseu dos Recreios (Lisbon), three shows at the Coliseu do Porto and one show at the Coliseu Micaelense in Ponta Delgada, Azores. After these shows, Ornatos Violeta disbanded again.

In late 2018, Ornatos Violeta reunited for a second time. The band announced three dates to celebrate the 20th anniversary of their 1999 album O Monstro Precisa de Amigos. During 2019, five more dates were announced. The band remains active and playing shows as of 2022.

== Discography ==
=== Studio albums ===
- 1997 - Cão!
- 1999 - O Monstro Precisa de Amigos

=== Compilations ===
- 2011 - Inéditos/Raridades
