= Witch Hat Atelier =

Japanese manga series

- First tankōbon volume cover, featuring Coco

とんがり帽子のアトリエ (Tongari Bōshi no Atorie)
- Genre: Fantasy
- Manga
- Written by: Kamome Shirahama
- Published by: Kodansha
- English publisher: NA: Kodansha USA
- Imprint: Morning KC
- Magazine: Morning Two
- Original run: July 22, 2016 – present
- Volumes: 16
- Novel

Witch Hat Atelier: Special Stories
- Written by: Jun Esaka
- Illustrated by: Kamome Shirahama
- Published by: Kodansha
- English publisher: NA: Kodansha USA
- Published: November 21, 2025
- Anime television series
- Directed by: Ayumu Watanabe; Jun Shinohara (assistant)
- Produced by: Hiroaki Kojima
- Written by: Hiroshi Seko
- Music by: Yuka Kitamura
- Studio: Bug Films
- Licensed by: Crunchyroll; SEA: Remow
- Original network: Tokyo MX, BS11, KBS Kyoto, Sun TV, TVA, TNC, HTB, MMT, AT-X
- Original run: April 6, 2026 – present
- Episodes: 13
- Spin-off
- Witch Hat Atelier Kitchen (2019–present)
- icon

Witch Hat Atelier (Japanese: とんがり帽子のアトリエ, Hepburn: Tongari Bōshi no Atorie) is a Japanese manga series written and illustrated by Kamome Shirahama. It has been serialized in Kodansha's seinen manga magazine Morning Two since July 2016, with its chapters collected in 16 tankōbon volumes as of April 2026. The series follows a girl named Coco, who becomes a witch apprentice to fulfill her longtime dream of becoming a witch and restore her mother whom she accidentally turned into stone.

An anime television series adaptation produced by Bug Films aired from April to June 2026. A second season has been announced. A spin-off manga series, Witch Hat Atelier Kitchen, started in Morning Two in November 2019.

By June 2026, the Witch Hat Atelier manga had over 9 million copies in circulation. In 2020 and 2025, the series won the Harvey Award for the Best Manga category as well as the Eisner Award for Best U.S. Edition of International Material—Asia.

== Synopsis ==
=== Setting ===
Witch Hat Atelier is set in a fictional, fantasy world, more specifically in the Zozah Peninsula, where magic can be performed by drawing magical runes with a special ink. Its use was common knowledge until a series of countless crises, wars and catastrophes led to the "Day of the Pact", when the Great Hall of Witches (魔法使いの大講堂, Mahōtsukai no Dai Kōdō) was established. From then on, only witches authorized by the Great Hall are allowed to perform magic or know how to use it, and their knowledge is kept a secret from the rest of the population, called "Outsiders". Any Outsider who discovers the truth or witches who break their rules have their memories about magic erased. Certain magical practices are also forbidden even amongst them due to the possible dangers it can cause, such as casting magic or drawing magical runes directly on the human body, with the exception of magic that erases memories, only allowed to protect their secret.

The witches from the Great Hall have a pointed hat with no brims as a sign of loyalty towards their traditions and rules, while there is also a group of rogue witches who reject the rules of the Day of the Pact known as the Brimmed Caps (つばあり帽, Tsuba ari-bō) who act in secret, covering their faces with brimmed hats and using forbidden magic.

=== Plot ===
Coco is the kind and daydreaming daughter of a dressmaker who aspires to become a witch, despite being told that only innate magic users can practice and use magic. One day, she meets a witch named Qifrey and after she witnesses how he uses magic, Coco realizes that a book she previously bought from a masked witch was actually a book about magic, which she uses to accidentally cast a spell that encases her mother and house in crystals.

Qifrey is tracking the Brimmed Cap behind the incident for his own agenda, and, as the only clue they have to restore her mother is a vague memory of the magic spell she cast, he takes Coco as his apprentice. She then starts learning magic under him alongside his three other female witch apprentices: Agott, Tetia, and Richeh, and supervised by Olruggio, another adult witch who is Qifrey's childhood friend. As Coco gets used to her new environment and develops her magic skills, the Brimmed Caps' interest in her grows, as they hope that she will help them revive the free use of magic.

== Production ==
According to series creator, Kamome Shirahama, the story "was sparked by a casual comment from a friend, who mentioned that the process of bringing an illustration into the world seemed just like magic." Having grown up with the works of Michael Ende and J. R. R. Tolkien, she had always wanted to try drawing high fantasy, as opposed to the bulk of popular fantasy at the time which she felt were mostly low fantasy works set in the real world or revolving around reincarnation. She cites The Lord of the Rings as one of the biggest influences on creating Witch Hat Atelier. She was also strongly inspired by shōjo fantasy manga such as Knights of Alfheim by Seika Nakayama, Crystal Dragon by Yūho Ashibe, and the works of Moto Hagio, Ryoko Yamagishi, and Kyōko Shitō.

Due to Shirahama's background as an illustrator, the art style of the series leans closer to that seen in classic children's books than manga, while also drawing from Renaissance art, Art Nouveau, Art Deco, American comics, and bande dessinée. This, along with the original idea of art seeming like magic, also contributed to the art-based magic system of the series, in which magic is an ink-drawn precise system of glyphs, runes, and signs; protagonist Coco's journey has been likened to that of an amateur artist aiming to turn professional. Unlike most contemporaries, Shirahama draws the bulk of the series using wooden ink pens and other traditional tools on paper; she cites the antique appeal of analog art as well as her unfamiliarity with digital tools.

The series has been consistently noted for the diversity of its cast and setting, along such axes as race, sexual orientation, and disability. Shirahama has stated that she sees this diversity as a natural thing and a reflection of the level of diversity she saw in works she grew up with, and is mindful to draw inspiration from a wide range of cultures and not overrepresent one specific region of the world.

== Media ==
=== Manga ===
Written and illustrated by Kamome Shirahama, Witch Hat Atelier started in Kodansha's seinen manga magazine Morning Two on July 22, 2016. The magazine ceased print publication and moved to a digital release starting on August 4, 2022. Kodansha has compiled its chapters into individual tankōbon volumes. The first volume was published on January 23, 2017. As of April 23, 2026, 16 volumes have been published.

In North America, Kodansha USA announced the acquisition of the series in July 2018. The first volume was published on April 9, 2019.

A spin-off manga series by Hiromi Sato, titled Witch Hat Atelier Kitchen, started in Morning Two on November 22, 2019.

=== Anime ===
In April 2022, it was announced that the series would receive an anime adaptation. It was later revealed at Anime Expo 2024 to be a television series that is produced by Bug Films and directed by Ayumu Watanabe, with Jun Shinohara as the assistant director, Hiroaki Kojima as the producer, Hiroshi Seko handling the series composition, Kairi Unabara designing the characters, and Yuka Kitamura composing the music. The series was originally scheduled for 2025; however, it was later delayed due to the ability "to present the charm of the project at an even higher quality". It aired from April 6 to June 29, 2026, on Tokyo MX and other networks. (Note: The first two episodes were released simultaneously on select streaming platforms. Subsequent episodes are released a week before their televised broadcast.) The opening theme song is "Kaze no Anthem" (風のアンセム; 'Wind's Anthem'), performed by Eve feat. Suis of Yorushika. The ending theme songs, performed by Nakamura Hak, are "Tada Utsukushii Noroi" (ただ美しい呪い; lit. 'Just a Beautiful Curse') (episodes 2, 4, 6–7, 9 and 11–13); "Yoru ni Ukabu" (夜に浮かぶ; lit. 'Floating in the Night') (episodes 3 and 5), and "Hikari" (光り; lit. 'Light'). Crunchyroll is streaming the series worldwide outside of Asia. Remow licensed the series in Southeast Asia, and the series was streamed in select Asian regions on Netflix.

After the airing of the first season finale, a second season was announced. Crunchyroll has secured its streaming rights.

=== Novel ===
A novel written by Jun Esaka, titled Witch Hat Atelier: Special Stories (小説 とんがり帽子のアトリエ スペシャルストーリーズ, Shōsetsu Tongari Bōshi no Atorie Supesharu Sutōrīzu), was released by Kodansha on November 21, 2025. Kodansha USA licensed the novel for English release in North America, and it is set to release in Q2 of 2027.

== Reception ==
The manga had 700,000 copies in circulation by July 2018; 1 million copies in circulation by September 2018; over 2.5 million copies in circulation by April 2022; over 4.5 million copies in circulation by October 2022; over 5.5 million copies in circulation by July 2024; over 7 million copies in circulation by November 2025; over 7.5 million copies in circulation by March 2026; and over 9 million copies in circulation by June 2026.

In North America, the first volume of Witch Hat Atelier was ranked on Circana BookScan's monthly top 20 adult graphic novels list from April to July 2026. It was also ranked on The New York Times' Graphic Books and Manga bestseller monthly list in June 2026.

Rebecca Silverman of Anime News Network rated the first two volumes an "A−". Silverman praised the series for its world, story, characters and artwork, and concluded that "this is one tale you don't want to miss". Writing for Barnes & Noble, Kelly Chiu listed the series on her list of "The Perfect Manga Matches for 10 Studio Ghibli Movies", and recommended the series to fans of Studio Ghibli's Spirited Away. American animator Dana Terrace endorsed the manga series on her Twitter account after receiving fan art from Shirahama of her recently concluded animated series The Owl House, describing Witch Hat Atelier as a "magical, queer, heart-racing story of empathy and self discovery".

=== Manga accolades ===
Year	Award	Category	Result	Ref.
2018	Kono Manga ga Sugoi! list of Best Manga	Male Readers	6th place	
2018	11th Manga Taishō	Manga Taishō	Nominated	
2018	Honya Club "Nationwide Bookstore Employees' Recommended Comics"	General Division	Won	
2018	42nd Kodansha Manga Award	Best General Manga	Nominated	
2018	12th ACBD Prix	Prix Asie de la Critique	Nominated	
2018	24th Manga Barcelona Awards	Best Seinen	Won	
2019	Ridibooks Comic Award	Next Manga	Won	
2019	Japan Expo Awards	Daruma d'or Manga	Won	
2019	Mangawa Prize	Best Seinen Manga	Won	
2019	Les Mordus du Manga Award	Grand Prize	Won	
2019	Angoulême International Comics Festival	Best Youth Comic	Nominated	
2019	Comic-Con International Best & Worst Manga	Best New Manga for Kids/Teens	Won	
2020	44th Kodansha Manga Award	Best General Manga	Nominated	
2020	French Babelio Readers' Awards	Best Manga Series	Won	
2020	YALSA List of Great Graphic Novels for Teens	Top 10 Graphic Novels	Won	
2020	Eisner Award	Best U.S. Edition of International Material—Asia	Won	
2020	Harvey Awards	Best Manga	Won	
2021	YALSA List of Great Graphic Novels for Teens	Top 10 Graphic Novels	Won	
2022	28th Manga Barcelona Awards	Best Seinen	Won	
2023	29th Manga Barcelona Awards	Best Seinen	Won	
2024	1st American Manga Awards	Best Translation	Won	
2024	1st American Manga Awards	Best Lettering	Won	
2024	Harvey Awards	Best Manga	Nominated	
2025	Harvey Awards	Best Manga	Won	
2026	Japan Expo Awards	Daruma for Finest Craftsmanship	Won	
2026	32nd Manga Barcelona Awards	Best Seinen	Pending	

=== Anime accolades ===
Year	Award	Category	Recipient	Result	Ref.
2026	6th Astra TV Awards	Best Anime Series	Witch Hat Atelier	Won	
2026	6th Astra TV Awards	Best Lead Voice-Over Performance	Anjali Kunapaneni as Coco	Nominated	
2026	6th Astra TV Awards	Best Supporting Voice-Over Performance in a Series	Joshua Waters as Qifrey	Nominated	
2026	32nd Manga Barcelona Awards	Best Anime Series Premiere	Witch Hat Atelier	Pending	
