= Cão! =

Studio album by Ornatos Violeta
- Released: 15 September 1997
- Genre: Alternative rock Funk
- Length: 49:53
- Label: Polygram
- Producer: Mário Barreiros

Ornatos Violeta chronology
| Cão! (1997) | O Monstro Precisa de Amigos (1999) |

Singles from Cão!
- 1. "Punk Moda Funk"; 2. "A Dama do Sinal"

Cão! was the first studio album by Portuguese rock band Ornatos Violeta, released on 15 September 1997 by Polygram. Three singles were released from this album: "Punk Moda Funk", "A Dama do Sinal" and "Mata-me Outra Vez".

== Reception ==
In 2009, Cão! was named by Blitz as the 5th best album released by a Portuguese band in the 90's. The album was also included in the same publication's list of the best albums recorded by bands from the city of Porto, along works by artists such as GNR, Rui Veloso and Blind Zero.

== Track listing ==
| No. | Title | Length |
|---|---|---|
| 1. | "Punk Moda Funk" | 3:10 |
| 2. | "Bigamia" | 2:28 |
| 3. | "Líbido" | 4:58 |
| 4. | "Letra S" | 1:32 |
| 5. | "A Dama do Sinal" | 3:14 |
| 6. | "1 Beijo=1000" | 4:04 |
| 7. | "O Amor É Isto" | 3:21 |
| 8. | "Homens de Princípios" | 3:03 |
| 9. | "Mata-me Outra Vez" | 4:56 |
| 10. | "Um Crime à Minha Porta" | 4:53 |
| 11. | "Débil Mental" | 4:57 |
| 12. | "Esfera" | 1:02 |
| 13. | "Chuva" | 1:30 |
| 14. | "Letra S" | 1:04 |
| 15. | "Raquel" | 1:30 |
| Total length: | | 49:53 |
