= Disadvantaged =

People with special problems or lacking money

The "disadvantaged" is a generic term for individuals or groups of people who:

- Face special problems such as physical or mental disability
- Lack money or economic support

== Economically disadvantaged ==
In common usage "the disadvantaged" is a generic term for those "from lower-income backgrounds" or "the Disadvantaged Poor". The "economically disadvantaged" is a term used by government institutions in for example allocating free school meals to "a student who is a member of a household that meets the income eligibility guidelines for free or reduced-price meals (less than or equal to 185% of US federal poverty guidelines)" or business grants.

The "disadvantaged" is often applied in a third world context and typically relate to women with reduced "upward mobility" suffering social exclusion and having limited access to natural resources and economic opportunities. They are often landless or marginal farmers operating on the most unproductive land.

According to Paul Krugman in an October 2002 article titled "about the distribution of wealth", there is even more of a divide between the classes today than in the 1920s, meaning that the disadvantaged are becoming more economically disadvantaged.

== Disadvantaged area ==
Many governments use Disadvantaged area as a designation for various "problem" areas. In the UK "disadvantaged area" is a term used for an area where there is a need "to stimulate the physical, economic and social regeneration" by attracting development and encouraging the purchase of properties, in special provisions for Stamp Tax relief and for areas where health is an issue. In the United States the Nursing Relief for Disadvantaged Areas Act allowed qualifying hospitals to employ temporary foreign workers as registered nurses.

== See also ==
- Disadvantaged child
- Disadvantaged pupil
- Political correctness
- Poverty
- Destitute
- Disabled
- Social exclusion
- Social vulnerability
