= Witch Hat Atelier Kitchen =

Japanese manga series

- First tankōbon volume cover, featuring Qifrey (left) and Olruggio (right)

とんがり帽子のキッチン (Tongari Bōshi no Kitchin)
- Genre: Cooking; Fantasy
- Created by: Kamome Shirahama
- Manga
- Written by: Hiromi Sato
- Published by: Kodansha
- English publisher: NA: Kodansha USA
- Imprint: Morning KC
- Magazine: Morning Two
- Original run: November 22, 2019 – present
- Volumes: 5
- icon

Witch Hat Atelier Kitchen (Japanese: とんがり帽子のキッチン, Hepburn: Tongari Bōshi no Kitchin) is a Japanese manga series written and illustrated by Hiromi Sato. It is a spin-off to the Witch Hat Atelier manga series by Kamome Shirahama. It has been serialized in Kodansha's seinen manga magazine Morning Two since November 2019.

== Premise ==
The series shows the daily lives of the main characters of Witch Hat Atelier, most notably Qifrey and Olruggio. Each chapter features a short story involving one of them preparing a different dish, ending with the recipe for said dish. Many of the dishes include fictional ingredients, but the end of each volume contains an index describing real-life substitutes for them.

== Publication ==
Written and illustrated by Hiromi Sato, Witch Hat Atelier Kitchen started in Kodansha's seinen manga magazine Morning Two on November 22, 2019. The magazine ceased print publication and move to a digital release starting on August 4, 2022. Kodansha released the first tankōbon volume on May 22, 2020. As of October 21, 2022, five volumes have been released.

During their panel at Anime NYC 2022, Kodansha USA announced that they had licensed the manga. The first volume was released on October 31, 2023.

=== Volumes ===
No.	Original release date	Original ISBN	English release date	English ISBN
1	May 22, 2020	978-4-06-519334-1	October 31, 2023	978-1-64-651843-2
Chapters 1–10
2	December 23, 2020	978-4-06-521627-9	February 20, 2024	978-1-64-651844-9
Chapters 11–20; Bonus Chapter
3	July 21, 2021	978-4-06-524099-1	April 23, 2024	978-1-64-651845-6
Chapters 21–31
4	April 21, 2022	978-4-06-527594-8	July 30, 2024	978-1-64-651846-3
Chapters 32–41
5	October 21, 2022	978-4-06-529699-8	October 22, 2024	978-1-64-651967-5
Chapters 42–49; Bonus Chapter
