= Nakamura Hak =

Japanese singer-songwriter

- Born: Den-en-chōfu, Ota, Tokyo, Japan
- Genre: J-pop
- Occupation: Singer-songwriter
- Instruments: Vocals, acoustic guitar
- Years active: 2026–present
- Label: maximum10 (Avex)

Nakamura Hak is a Japanese singer-songwriter. She is known for her distinctive musical style in which all tracks are recorded in a single, unedited and uncorrected take, featuring her singing while playing the acoustic guitar simultaneously.

== Career ==
In 2026, Nakamura was selected to perform theme songs for major media productions despite being an unknown artist at the time. Her song "Zen to Aku" (善と悪) was used as the opening theme for the TV Tokyo drama Lunacy (るなしい), and three of her songs—"Tada Utsukushii Noroi" (ただ美しい呪い), "Yoru ni Ukabu" (夜に浮かぶ), and "Hikari" (光り)—were featured as ending themes for the anime adaptation of the manga series Witch Hat Atelier.

On May 20, 2026, Nakamura released her debut EP, Shiro wa Yume (白は夢), as a physical CD-only release through maximum10, an imprint of the Avex Group. The title track, "Shiro wa Yume", received heavy rotation across nationwide radio stations, reaching number eight on the Plantech radio airplay chart for the week of May 11–17, 2026. Following the release, she announced her first nationwide unplugged live tour, titled "Itan" (異端), scheduled to take place from September 2026 to January 2027. Her first physical single, "Tada Utsukushii Noroi", was scheduled for release on June 10, 2026.

== Musical style and reception ==
Nakamura's insistence on raw, unedited one-take recordings using a single microphone has drawn significant attention from music critics. Writing for Music Natalie, music journalist Fumiaki Amano described her music as "radical" and "isolated," noting that the complete absence of digital correction captures an intense sense of tension and direct human presence, down to her breathing and the friction of fingers against guitar strings. Critic Yuka Ishizumi highlighted that Nakamura's minimalist arrangement is a deliberate aesthetic choice rather than a mere reproduction of traditional folk singing, bringing a sharp, self-reckoning energy that contrasts her fragile vocal tone with bleak, uncompromising lyrical themes.

== Works ==
=== Tie-ups ===
Year	Song	Tie-up
2026	"Zen to Aku" (善と悪)	Opening theme for the TV Tokyo drama Lunacy
2026	"Tada Utsukushii Noroi" (ただ美しい呪い)	Ending themes for the anime series Witch Hat Atelier
2026	"Yoru ni Ukabu" (夜に浮かぶ)	Ending themes for the anime series Witch Hat Atelier
2026	"Hikari" (光り)	Ending themes for the anime series Witch Hat Atelier

=== Discography ===
==== Extended plays ====
Release date	Title	Type	Notes
May 20, 2026	Shiro wa Yume (白は夢)	EP (CD only)	Includes "Zen to Aku"

==== Physical singles ====
Release date	Title	Type	Notes
June 10, 2026	"Tada Utsukushii Noroi" (ただ美しい呪い)	Single (CD only)	Anime theme song; scheduled release

==== Digital singles ====
Release date	Title	Notes
May 1, 2026	"Tada Utsukushii Noroi" (ただ美しい呪い)	Pre-released from the 1st single
May 6, 2026	"Yoru ni Ukabu" (夜に浮かぶ)	Pre-released from the 1st single
May 13, 2026	"Zen to Aku" (善と悪)	Pre-released from the 1st EP
September 16, 2026	"Hikari" (光り)	Released from the 1st single
