= Pluto (Portuguese band) =

Portuguese alternative rock band

- Origin: Porto, Portugal
- Genres: Alternative rock
- Years active: 2004-present
- Members: Manel Cruz; Peixe; Eduardo; Ruka

Pluto is a Portuguese alternative rock band, which emerged from the splitting up of Ornatos Violeta (in 2002), where Manel Cruz (frontman and vocalist) and Peixe (guitarist) played. The others members are Eduardo (bass guitar) and Ruka (drums).

Their first album, Bom Dia (Good Morning), was released on 18 October 2004, entering straight to the 6th place of the Portuguese chart.

== Discography ==
- Bom Dia (2004)
  1. "Entre Nós" – 2:59
  2. "Sexo Mono" – 2:42
  3. "Segue-me à Luz" – 4:14
  4. "O 2 Vem Sempre Depois" – 3:09
  5. "A Vida dos Outros" – 5:12
  6. "Convite" – 4:36
  7. "Prisão" – 6:48
  8. "Lição de Adição" – 2:06
  9. "Líderes & Filhos Lda" – 4:17
  10. "Só Mais Um Começo" – 3:48
  11. "Bem Vindo a Ti" – 6:47
  12. "Algo Teu" – 1:55
