= Remow =

Japanese media company

REMOW Co., Ltd.
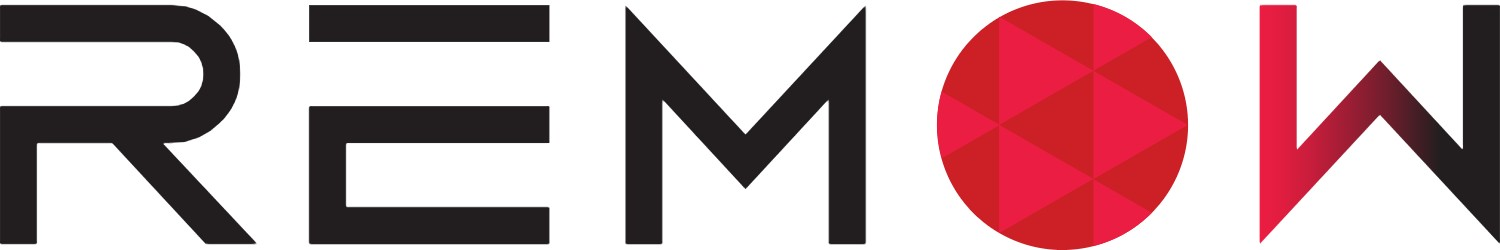
- Native name: REMOW株式会社
- Type: Private
- Industry: Entertainment
- Genre: Anime
- Founded: November 9, 2021; 4 years ago
- Founder: Akira Ishii
- Headquarters: Kanda, Chiyoda, Tokyo, Japan
- Area served: Worldwide
- Key people: Akira Ishii (CEO); Masayuki Sano (CAO); Kelvin Wu (Chief Overseas Strategic Officer)
- Products: Anime; Asian cinema Digital media Motion pictures Merchandising
- Brands: It's Anime
- Services: Licensing; publishing; streaming; television
- Owners: See § Ownership
- Subsidiaries: Remow Korea; Remow Latam
- Website: www.remow.com

Remow Co., Ltd. (Japanese: REMOW株式会社, Hepburn: Remow Kabushiki-gaisha) is a Japanese media company headquartered in Chiyoda, Tokyo. The company was founded in late 2021, and specializes in the global distribution, production, and intellectual property (IP) management of Japanese entertainment, particularly anime. REMOW operates as a strategic joint venture backed by major Japanese publishers, broadcasters, and conglomerates, including Shueisha, Sumitomo Corporation, Toei Animation, and TV Tokyo. Its primary mission is to establish a legitimate global distribution network for Japanese content to combat piracy and expand the market for Japanese IP. Most of the anime licensed by Remow are primarily seen on the company's It's Anime YouTube channel and on Netflix and Amazon Prime Video, (Note: Usually, the first 3 episodes of a Remow-liscenced anime series are streamed on its YouTube channel (with limited streaming for episode 4 and onwards), while the full series can be streamed on other streaming sites, primarily on Netflix and Amazon Prime Video.) and in some cases on Crunchyroll.

It's Anime
- Type: FAST television channel
- Broadcast area: Worldwide

Programming
- Language: English
- Picture format: 1080p HD

Ownership
- Owner: Remow

History
- Launched: July 27, 2022; 4 years ago (YouTube channel); July 2, 2025; 16 months ago (FAST channel)

Availability

Streaming media
- WatchFree+: Ch. 986
- Samsung TV Plus: Ch. 3202
- Live TV on PS5: None
- Amazon Freevee: None
- Pluto TV: None

Remow

YouTube information
- Channel: It's Anime powered by REMOW
- Years active: 2022–present
- Genre: Anime
- Subscribers: 988 thousand
- Views: 117 million

== History ==
REMOW was established on November 9, 2021, by Akira Ishii, who serves as the company's CEO. The company was founded during a period of rapid growth in the global anime market, which reached record highs in the early 2020s.

In May 2022, REMOW raised ¥1.28 billion in a seed funding round from nine major partners, including DeNA, Fuji Media Holdings, and Toei Animation. That same year, it formed a capital alliance with Anime Onegai, a streaming service catering to the Latin American market.

By early 2025, the company secured significant strategic investment from Sumitomo Corporation and an additional injection from Shueisha. This partnership was designed to leverage Sumitomo's global infrastructure and Shueisha's vast library of manga titles to accelerate REMOW's "hardware and software" distribution strategy.

On July 2, 2025, REMOW launched the "It's Anime" FAST Channel in North America, and later launched it on VIZIO's WatchFree+ app in the United States later on December 1.

== Licenses ==
Remow produces and licenses a lot of anime adaptations, not only from Shueisha titles, but also from other companies, like Akita Shoten, Kodansha and Shogakukan (The latter were also under Shueisha parent company Hitotsubashi Group).

Licensing

- 2.5 Dimensional Seduction (Latin America)
- A Livid Lady's Guide to Getting Even
- Berserk (Latin America)
- Chitose is in the Ramune Bottle
- Fermat Kitchen (North America)
- Full Moon
- Gag Manga Biyori GO
- Gushing over Magical Girls (Latin America)
- Haigakura
- Hajime no Ippo (Latin America)
- Hell Teacher: Jigoku Sensei Nube
- High School! Kimengumi (North America)
- Ichijyoma Mankitsu Gurashi!
- Katekyo Hitman Reborn!
- Kill Blue
- Kuroko no Basket (Latin America)
- Liar Game
- Monster (Latin America)
- The Moon on a Rainy Night
- Miru: Paths to My Future
- My Deer Friend Nokotan
- My Stepmother and Stepsisters Aren't Wicked
- Nabari
- Necromancer Isekai
- Psyren
- Shaman King Flowers (Latin America)
- Squid Girl (Latin America)
- Tasokare Hotel
- There's No Freaking Way I'll be Your Lover! Unless...
- Tonbo!
- Tougen Anki
- Umamusume: Cinderella Gray
- With You, Our Love Will Make It Through
- Your Forma
- Yowamushi Pedal (Latin America)

== Ownership ==
As of December 2025, shareholders of REMOW Co., Ltd are:

- Shueisha Inc. (Largest shareholder)
- Sumitomo Corporation
- Toei Company and Toei Animation
- TV Tokyo Corporation
- Fuji Media Holdings
- MBS Media Holdings
- ADK Emotions
- Amuse Inc.
