= Central Allocation Office =

CAO Central Allocation Office GmbH
- Company type: GmbH
- Industry: Capacity sales
- Founded: 2008
- Defunct: December 31, 2015
- Headquarters: Freising, Germany
- Products: Allocation operations
- Website: www.central-ao.com

CAO Central Allocation Office GmbH was the joint auction office allocating cross border electricity transmission capacity for borders between Austria, Czech Republic, Germany, Hungary, Poland, Slovakia and Slovenia. CAO acted as commission agent of owners of transmission networks.

== Background ==
The Internal Electricity Market (IEM) was divided into seven sub-regions with the intention to foster market development first on a regional level to be connected into the real IEM in 2014. One of these predefined regions was the Central-Eastern Europe (CEE) consisting of Austria, Czech Republic, Germany, Hungary, Poland, Slovakia and Slovenia. CAO was established in 2008 by eight transmission system operators (TSOs) from CEE: 50Hertz Transmission GmbH, Austrian Power Grid, ČEPS, a.s., Elektro-Slovenija d.o.o., TenneT TSO, MAVIR ZRt., PSE S.A. and SEPS, a.s. to implement a regional coordinated congestion management procedure in the CEE.

== History ==
From November 2009, CAO provided electricity market participants, active in the Central and Eastern Europe region, with a single point of registration for capacity auctions in CEE and took over the role of the auction office for the 5 TSOs within the CEE region and carried out the coordinated Net transfer capacity (NTC) auction.

In November 2010, CAO took over the entire organization of the auction process and capacity calculation coordination in the CEE region. This entails the introduction of one document of the common auction rules and auctions operation by CAO as the CEE single auction office in its web based auction ePortal. Available capacities are determined by applying an enhanced coordinated NTC assessment method based on a multilayer coordination of offered capacities. Coordinated capacity allocation process use auction algorithm based on maximization of social welfare.

From November 2012, CAO also provided a coordinated auction process on the borders between Croatia and Hungary and Croatia and Slovenia.

On December 31, 2015 CAO became part of JAO (Joint Allocation Office) with headquarters in Luxembourg and the branch in Freising legally ceased to exist.

== Outlook ==
Beside of operational activities which were developed in first years of CAO existence, CAO expertise in area of common capacity determination (grid calculation) and project management was used in projects (of TSOs, PXs, NRAs) contributing to creation of IEM.

== Partnership ==
Beside of cooperation with TSOs as natural customers of CAO, the company had also connections with other participants of electricity market. CAO established a Customer Advisory Committee to discuss and coordinate with market participants in area of planned development of the congestion management process, new services and products and their specification and IT changes. This platform is used also to collect market participants proposals and feedback to CAO services. The European Federation of Energy Traders cooperated with CAO in frame of this platform and also by direct contacts.
