= Compliance Advisor/Ombudsman =

The Office of the Compliance Advisor Ombudsman (CAO) is the independent accountability mechanism for projects supported by the International Finance Corporation (IFC) and the Multilateral Investment Guarantee Agency (MIGA), members of the World Bank Group. CAO was established in 1999 and is based in Washington, D.C.

CAO addresses the environmental and social concerns of people and communities affected by IFC- and MIGA-supported projects. Its mission is to serve as a fair, trusted and effective independent accountability mechanism that facilitates access to remedy for project-affected people and enhances the environmental and social performance of IFC and MIGA.

CAO carries out its mandate through three functions: Dispute Resolution, Compliance and Advisory.

In June 2026, the World Bank Group Boards approved the integration of CAO, the World Bank Inspection Panel and the World Bank Dispute Resolution Service into a single World Bank Group Independent Accountability Mechanism. The new mechanism will serve as an independent and accessible forum for people who believe they have been, or are likely to be, adversely affected by a World Bank Group-financed operation. It will discharge its mandate through Dispute Resolution, Compliance and Advisory functions.

== Mandate and governance ==
CAO's mandate is to facilitate the resolution of complaints from people who may be affected by IFC- and MIGA-supported projects, enhance the environmental and social outcomes of those projects and foster greater public accountability of IFC and MIGA.

CAO considers complaints concerning environmental and social harm related to any aspect of the planning, implementation or impact of an IFC- or MIGA-supported project or subproject. IFC's Performance Standards on Environmental and Social Sustainability establish requirements for IFC clients concerning the identification and management of environmental and social risks and impacts.

CAO reports directly to the IFC and MIGA Boards. The CAO Director General reports to the Boards, and CAO's three functions and staff report to the Director General. CAO provides quarterly and annual updates on its activities to the Board's Committee on Development Effectiveness.

CAO case reports are circulated to the Boards, IFC or MIGA, complainants and the relevant client and are publicly disclosed, subject to applicable confidentiality provisions. CAO's budget is submitted to the Boards annually, and CAO publishes an annual report at the end of each fiscal year.

== Functions ==
=== Dispute Resolution ===
The Dispute Resolution function helps resolve issues raised about the environmental and social impacts of projects or subprojects through a neutral, collaborative and problem-solving approach. It is a voluntary process that requires agreement between the complainant and the IFC or MIGA client or subclient.

Depending on the circumstances of the complaint and the preferences of the parties, CAO may use mediation, facilitation and information sharing, joint fact-finding, dialogue or negotiation. Any agreement is developed by the parties rather than imposed by CAO. At the request of the parties, CAO may monitor implementation of an agreement.

=== Compliance ===
The Compliance function reviews IFC and MIGA compliance with their environmental and social policies, assesses related harm and recommends remedial actions where appropriate.

When a complaint is transferred to the Compliance function, CAO conducts a compliance appraisal. The appraisal considers whether there are preliminary indications of harm or potential harm, whether IFC or MIGA may not have complied with its environmental and social policies and whether the alleged harm is plausibly linked to the potential non-compliance.

At the conclusion of the appraisal, CAO decides whether to investigate, merge, defer or close the case. If CAO conducts an investigation and identifies non-compliance and related harm, IFC or MIGA prepares a management response and, where applicable, a Management Action Plan for consideration by the relevant Board. CAO monitors the effective implementation of the actions set out in an approved Management Action Plan.

=== Advisory ===
The Advisory function provides advice to IFC, MIGA and their Boards for the purpose of improving the environmental and social performance of IFC and MIGA. Advisory work is based on insights and experience arising from CAO's Dispute Resolution and Compliance functions.

The Advisory function may identify systemic environmental and social issues and trends and develop recommendations to support institutional learning. It does not provide project-specific advice that could compromise CAO's independence or its ability to consider a future complaint.

== Complaint eligibility and process ==
Any individual or group, or a representative authorized to act on their behalf, who believes that they are or may be harmed by an IFC- or MIGA-supported project or subproject may lodge a complaint with CAO.

Complaints must be submitted in writing and may be presented in any language. There are no formal requirements for lodging a complaint, but complaints should include:

- the complainant's name, address and other contact information;
- the identity and nature of the project or subproject;
- a statement describing how the complainant believes they have been or may be harmed;
- information identifying the people represented and evidence of authorization when a complaint is submitted by a representative; and
- an indication of whether the complainant requests that their identity or any information communicated as part of the complaint remain confidential.

CAO considers a complaint eligible when:

1. the complaint relates to an active IFC or MIGA project;
1. the issues raised pertain to CAO's mandate to address the environmental and social impacts of projects; and
1. the complainant is or may be affected by the harm raised in the complaint.

An eligibility decision does not constitute a judgment on the merits of the complaint. CAO normally completes eligibility screening within 15 business days after acknowledging receipt. When CAO requires clarification from the complainant, IFC or MIGA, it may extend the screening period by up to 20 business days.

Complaints ordinarily must concern an active project. In exceptional circumstances, CAO may deem eligible a complaint submitted up to 15 months after IFC or MIGA has exited a project. The complainant must provide compelling reasons why the complaint could not have been submitted before exit, the complaint must meet the other eligibility criteria, and CAO must consider acceptance of the complaint consistent with its mandate.

Complaints concerning fraud or corruption are referred to the World Bank Group Integrity Vice Presidency. Complaints relating exclusively to IFC or MIGA procurement decisions are referred to IFC or MIGA. Complaints concerning projects supported by the International Bank for Reconstruction and Development or the International Development Association are referred to the World Bank's independent accountability mechanism.

=== Financial consumer protection in microfinance ===
On 6 July 2026, the IFC Board of Executive Directors directed CAO to suspend processing of ongoing CAO cases relating to financial consumer protection in microfinance. Pending discussion of the policy issues, CAO will not take on new cases relating to financial consumer protection in microfinance.

The Board stated that whether any part of financial consumer protection should be covered under the IFC Sustainability Framework would be considered at the time of the Sustainability Framework update.

=== Assessment ===
After determining that a complaint is eligible, CAO conducts an assessment to develop an understanding of the issues and concerns, engage with the parties, identify relevant stakeholders and explain CAO's functions, scope and possible outcomes. The assessment does not entail a judgment on the merits of the complaint.

During the assessment, the complainant and the IFC or MIGA client or subclient decide whether they wish to initiate a Dispute Resolution or Compliance process. If the parties agree to undertake Dispute Resolution, CAO facilitates the process. If there is no agreement, the complaint proceeds to the Compliance function.

CAO publishes an assessment report that summarizes the information gathered, the perspectives of the parties and the decision to pursue Dispute Resolution or proceed to Compliance.

== Leadership ==
Dame Meg Taylor was appointed as the first IFC/MIGA Compliance Advisor/Ombudsman in 1999. She began her tenure in June 1999 and served until 2014.

Osvaldo Gratacós succeeded Taylor as CAO Vice President in 2014 and served until 2020.

Janine Ferretti began her term as CAO Vice President in January 2021 and became Director General in July 2021 following the adoption of the IFC/MIGA Independent Accountability Mechanism Policy. She served until July 2026.

The World Bank Group Boards designated Ibrahim James Pam, Chair of the World Bank Inspection Panel, to concurrently serve as acting CAO Director General effective 2 August 2026. He will serve in the role until the appointment of the Director General and Vice President of the new World Bank Group Independent Accountability Mechanism.

== History and policy framework ==
CAO was established in 1999 in response to calls from global and regional civil-society organizations for an independent accountability mechanism for IFC and MIGA. World Bank Group President James D. Wolfensohn appointed Dame Meg Taylor as the first IFC/MIGA Compliance Advisor/Ombudsman.

CAO's first Operational Guidelines were published in 2000. Revised Operational Guidelines were issued in 2004, 2007 and 2013.

The IFC/MIGA Independent Accountability Mechanism Policy took effect on 1 July 2021. The policy sets out CAO's purpose, mandate, functions, core principles, governance and operations. It also changed CAO's reporting line from the President of the World Bank Group to the IFC and MIGA Boards.

== Integration into the World Bank Group Independent Accountability Mechanism ==
In June 2026, the World Bank Group Boards approved the integration of CAO, the World Bank Inspection Panel and the World Bank Dispute Resolution Service into a single World Bank Group Independent Accountability Mechanism.

The new mechanism will build on the operational experience, institutional knowledge and practices of the three existing mechanisms. It will serve as an independent and accessible forum for people who believe they have been, or are likely to be, adversely affected by a World Bank Group-financed operation and will discharge its mandate through Dispute Resolution, Compliance and Advisory functions.

The Director General of the new mechanism will be appointed by and report to the World Bank Group Boards under the oversight of the Committee on Development Effectiveness and will be independent of World Bank Group management.

During the transition, the existing accountability mechanisms continue to operate under their current mandates and policies.

== See also ==
- International Finance Corporation
- Multilateral Investment Guarantee Agency
- World Bank Inspection Panel
- Ombudsman
