= Child Arrangement Order =

A Child Arrangement Order or Child Arrangements Order (CAO) is an agreement under English family law concerning where a child lives and whom a child can have contact with. CAOs are usually sought following the breakdown of a relationship and replace 'contact orders' and 'residence orders'. Their legal basis is under section 8 of the Children Act 1989.

Agreement partner may be able to avoid going to court if you agree on:

- where the children will live
- how much time they’ll spend with each parent
- how you’ll financially support your children

This is called making child arrangements (sometimes known as ‘child custody’ or ‘child contact’).

== See also ==
- Prohibited Steps Order
- Parental Responsibility Order
