= Kamome Shirahama =

Japanese manga artist and illustrator

- 白浜 鴎
- Born: May 7
- Education: Tokyo University of the Arts
- Notable work: Witch Hat Atelier
- Awards: Daruma d'Or Manga (2019); Eisner Award (2020); Harvey Award (2020); Prix Babelio (2020)

Kamome Shirahama (白浜 鴎, Shirahama Kamome) is a Japanese freelance manga artist and illustrator. She is best known as the creator of her Witch Hat Atelier series. She has created variant covers and other illustrations for Marvel Comics, DC Comics, and stories in the Star Wars franchise. She did the character designs for The Elder, part of the Star Wars: Visions short film series released in 2021, and she wrote the 2022 manga adaptation for it. She has also provided illustrations for the Pokémon Trading Card Game.

She has won and been nominated for multiple awards, including the Eisner Award, the Harvey Award, the Kodansha Manga Award, the Manga Taishō, the Daruma d'Or Manga at the Japan Expo Awards, the Mangawa Award, and the Prix Babelio.

== Biography ==
Shirahama was born on May 7. She graduated from the design program at the Tokyo University of the Arts. She works using analog tools such as pencils, pen and ink, and colored pencils rather than digital tools. Influences on her work include The Lord of the Rings and Harry Potter novels, which she read in junior high school, as well as the Art Nouveau and Art Deco styles. Her art style has multiple influences, including Alphonse Mucha, Mœbius, Hayao Miyazaki, and Moto Hagio.

Her debut story was Watashi no Kuro-chan (わたしのクロちゃん), published by Enterbrain in Fellows! in 2011. She made her multi-part story publishing debut with Eniale & Dewiela in Fellows! in 2012. The series ran for two years, ending in July 2015, and was collected in three volumes released in June 2013, June 2014, and July 2015. The series was translated into French and released by Pika Édition in 2019.

She began doing variant covers and other illustration and concept work for Marvel Comics, DC Comics, and Star Wars comics in 2015 after her art was noticed at New York Comic Con, working on titles such as Star Wars: Doctor Aphra, Deadpool, and Batgirl and the Birds of Prey. Witch Hat Atelier began serialization in Kodansha's Monthly Morning Two manga magazine in July 2016. When the first collected volume was released in January 2017, the manga was so popular it became hard to find copies in stores.

In June 2022, her Star Wars manga short work, The Elder, was published in Big Gangan. She also did the character designs for the animated version of the story.

Starting in Late 2024 with Scarlet & Violet: Surging Sparks, Shirahama has also provided illustrations for the Pokémon Trading Card Game.

== Bibliography ==
- Watashi no Kuro-chan (わたしのクロちゃん) in Fellows! (2011, one-shot, Enterbrain)
- Eniale & Dewiela (エニデヴィ, Enidevi) in Fellows! (2013–2015, 3 volumes, Kadokawa)
- Witch Hat Atelier (2016–present, 16 volumes (as of September 2026), Kodansha)
  - Witch Hat Atelier Kitchen with art by Hiromi Satō (spin-off series, 2019–present, 5 volumes (as of May 2023), Kodansha)
- I Am Gandhi with text by Brad Meltzer (2018, Penguin Random House, ISBN 9780525552727)
- Atelier of Witch Hat Reproduction Selection (とんがり帽子のアトリエ 複製原画集, Tongari Bōshi no Atorie: Fukusei Gengashū) (November 2019, Kodansha, ISBN 9784065150580)
- Continuation (承前, Shōzen) in Kugutsu Senki 01 (傀儡戦記 01) (July 2021, Kodansha, ISBN 978-4-06-521782-5)
- Star Wars: Visions: The Elder (May 25, 2022, in the June 2022 issue of Big Gangan, Square Enix)

=== Cover art ===
- Noises: Kuro to Kin no Akanai Kagi. Kōshiki Visual Book (NOISES 黒と金の開かない鍵。公式ビジュアルブック, Zawameki: Kuro to Kin no Akanai Kagi. Kōshiki Bijuaru Bukku) (April 2011, Ohzora Publishing, ISBN 978-4-7767-9583-4)
- Kuro to Kin no Akanai Kagi.: Kindan no Tobira (黒と金の開かない鍵。 -禁断の扉-) (July 2011, Enterbrain, ISBN 9784047274037)
- Batgirl and the Birds of Prey, variant covers for issues #1-19, 21-22 (2016–2018, DC Comics)
- Star Wars: Doctor Aphra, cover art for issues #5-6, 9-13, and collected volume #2 (2017–2018, Marvel Comics)
- Star Wars: The Last Jedi, cover art for issue #2 (May 2018, Marvel Comics)
- Nightwing (2016 series), variant cover for issue #52 (November 2018, DC Comics)
- Shazam! (2018 series), variant cover for issue #6 (June 2019, DC Comics)
- Wonder Woman (2016 series), variant cover for issue #63 (January 2019, DC Comics)

== Reception ==
Jérôme Briot of Zoo magazine praised the "swirling graphics and rare elegance" in Eniale & Dewiela, citing Shirahama's artistic inspiration from Alphone Mucha-esque Art Nouveau style. The French website, Manga-News, said the storyline of Eniale & Dewiela sometimes moved too quickly, jumping straight into the story without any setup. Because the individual stories in the series are fairly short, big ideas are often left unexplored. Despite these notes, Shirahama often surprised them with "a lot of imagination and crazy little ideas ... surprises ... [and] even a little emotion". The site praised her mixing and tweaking of various religious themes throughout the series, the chemistry between the two polar-opposite main characters, the quality of the artwork, and design and composition of the pages.

James Davis Nicoll at Tor.com described Shirahama's artwork in the Witch Hat Atelier manga as "sumptuous" and "evocative", and gave her "high marks for plausible magic". Rebecca Silverman at Anime News Network praised Shirahama's subtle characterization, stating that "all of the characters have layers to their personalities". She goes on to praise the "strong writing [that] is ably enhanced by truly beautiful artwork", stating that "you don't want to miss" it.

Her work on Witch Hat Atelier was described as "breathtaking" by Kelly Chu, who compared it favorably with the Studio Ghibli film Spirited Away. The Young Adult Library Services Association (YALSA) of the American Library Association ranked Witch Hat Atelier as one of the "Top 10 Graphic Novels for Teens" in 2020 and 2021. Her art was described by the French website, Manga-News, as "striking" and having an "extensive visual look", with "sharp shading imitating and engraving style". As of October 2022, the manga series had over 4.5 million copies in circulation worldwide.

== Selected awards and honors ==
Shirahama has been nominated for and won multiple awards.

| Year | Organization | Award title, Category | Work | Result | Refs |
|---|---|---|---|---|---|
| 2018 | Kodansha | Kodansha Manga Award, General | Witch Hat Atelier | Nominated | |
| 2018 | Manga Barcelona | Manga Barcelona Award, Seinen | Witch Hat Atelier | Won | |
| 2018 | Manga Taishō Executive Committee | Manga Taishō | Witch Hat Atelier | Nominated | |
| 2019 | Angoulême International Comics Festival | Best Youth Comic | Witch Hat Atelier | Nominated | |
| 2019 | Japan Expo | Japan Expo Awards, Daruma d'or manga | Witch Hat Atelier | Won | |
| 2019 | L'ange Bleu | Mangawa Award, Best Seinen Manga | Witch Hat Atelier | Won | |
| 2019 | Ridibooks | Ridibooks Comic Award, Next Manga Award | Witch Hat Atelier | Won | |
| 2020 | Babelio | Prix Babelio, Manga | Witch Hat Atelier | Won | |
| 2020 | Comic-Con International | Eisner Award, Best U.S. Edition of International Material—Asia | Witch Hat Atelier | Won | |
| 2020 | Harvey Awards Nomination Committee | Harvey Award, Best Manga | Witch Hat Atelier | Won | |
| 2020 | Kodansha | Kodansha Manga Award, General | Witch Hat Atelier | Nominated | |
