= IMAnimation =

Japanese animation programming block

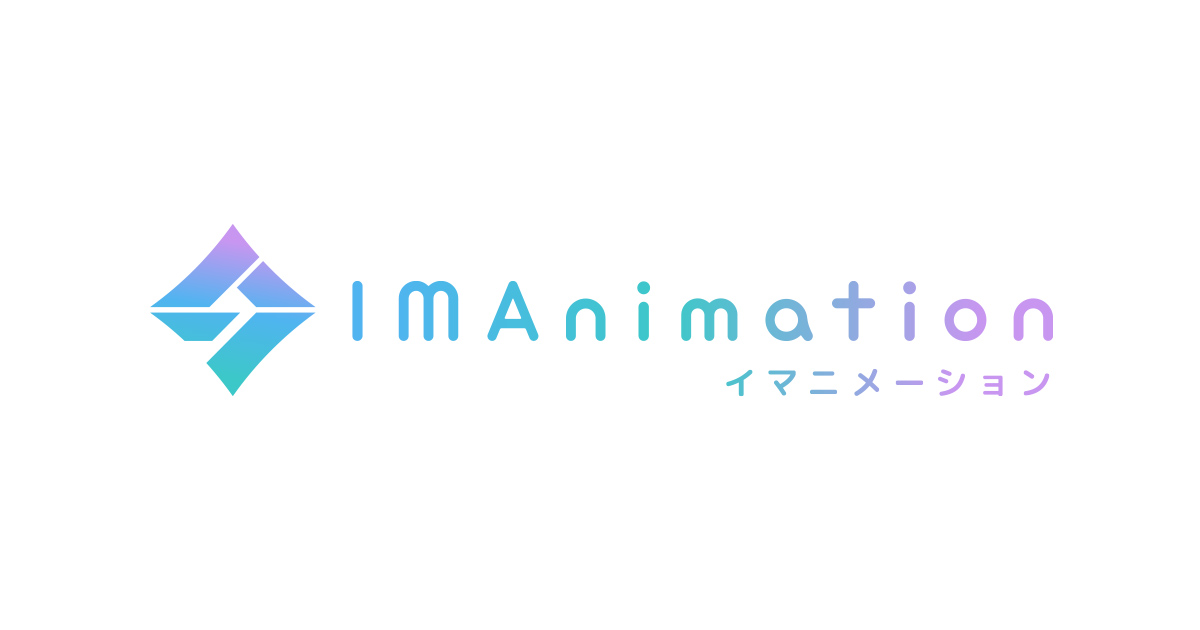
- Network: TV Asahi
- Launched: October 6, 2024; 2 years ago
- Division of: ANN
- Country of origin: Japan
- Running time: Saturdays 23:30 - 24:00 (JST)
- Original language: Japanese
- Official website: Official website

IMAnimation W
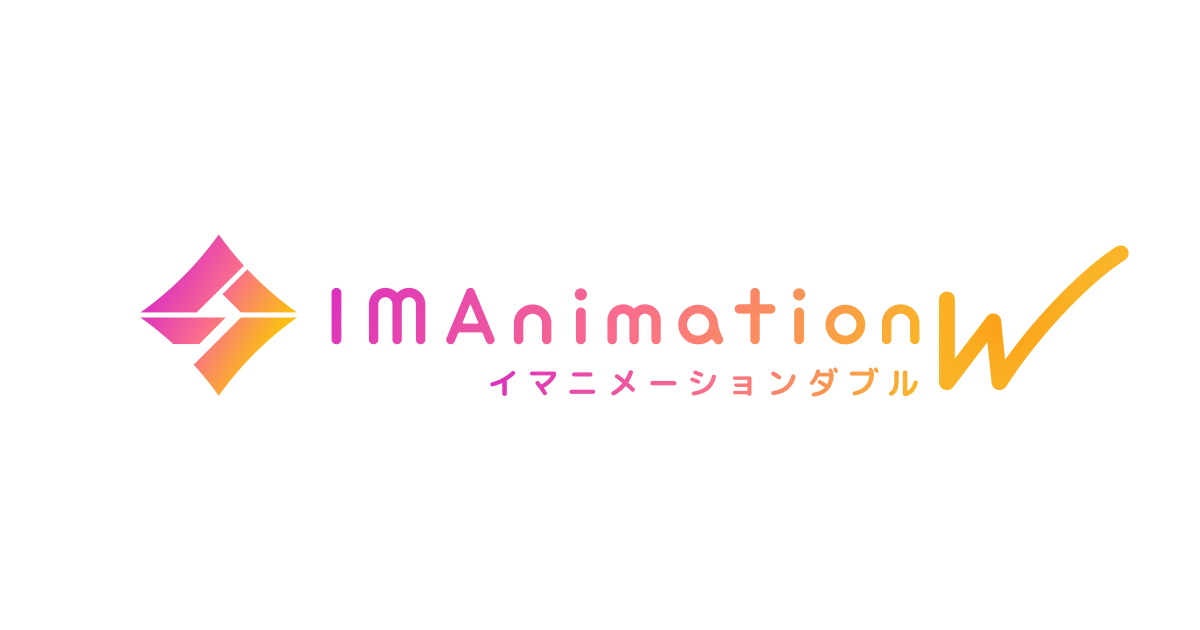
- Network: TV Asahi
- Launched: April 2, 2025; 18 months ago
- Division of: ANN
- Country of origin: Japan
- Running time: Wednesdays 23:45 - 24:15 (JST) (Note: TV Asahi and all other stations); Thursdays 1:03 - 1:33 (JST) (Note: ABC Television)
- Original language: Japanese
- Official website: Official website

IMAnimation (Japanese: イマニメーション, romanized: Imanimēshon) is a Japanese late-night anime programming block planned and produced by TV Asahi under the TV Asahi Animation label and under the All-Nippon News Network affiliation, which launched in October 2024. The block airs on Saturday nights from 23:30 to 24:00 JST (effectively Saturday nights from 11:30 p.m. to Sunday midnight JST).

The block received an extension in 2025, titled IMAnimation W (イマニメーション, Imanimēshon Daburu), which airs on the same channel and its affiliates on Wednesday nights from 23:45 to 24:15 JST (effectively Wednesday nights from 11:45 p.m. to Thursday 12:15 a.m. JST). excluding ABC Television which airs the block from 25:03 to 25:33 JST (effectively Thursday mornings from 1:03 to 1:33 a.m. JST), following after Knight in Night.

== History ==
Prior to the creation of the block, the timeslot was originally used for the Saturday Night Drama TV drama programming block from 2001 to 2024, as well as variety programs occasionally. On June 24, 2024, the block is officially announced, and is the second late-night anime network timeslot on TV Asahi following NUMAnimation, which previously aired in a local timeslot prior to October 2020. Following the announcement, the TV Asahi Animation label was created in order to house the block, as well as NUMAnimation, Doraemon and Crayon Shin-chan. The second season of Blue Lock became the first program to air on the timeslot.

=== IMAnimation W ===
On December 17, 2024, TV Asahi announced an extension of the block, titled IMAnimation W. Like with IMAnimation, its timeslot was also originally used for variety programs; it is the third late-night anime programming block on the network. Your Forma became the first program to air on the timeslot.

== Titles ==
#	Block	Title	Start date (Note: All dates shown are reflective of the actual calendar date of broadcast.)	End date	Eps.	Studio	Notes	Ref.
1	IM	Blue Lock vs. U-20 Japan (Note: The first season aired from October 9, 2022 to March 26, 2023, on TV Asahi and its affiliates on the NUMAnimation timeslot.)	October 5, 2024	December 28, 2024	14	Eight Bit	Based on the manga series by Muneyuki Kaneshiro and Yusuke Nomura. Second season and sequel to Blue Lock.	
2	IM	Babanba Banban Vampire	January 11, 2025	March 29, 2025	12	Gaina	Based on the manga series by Hiromasa Okujima.	
3	IM W	Your Forma	April 2, 2025	June 25, 2025	13	Geno Studio	Based on the light novel series by Mareho Kikuishi and Tsubata Nozaki.	
4	IM	From Old Country Bumpkin to Master Swordsman	April 5, 2025	June 22, 2025	12	Passione; Hayabusa Film	Based on the light novel series by Shigeru Sagazaki and Tetsuhiro Nabeshima.	
5	IM W	Hell Teacher: Jigoku Sensei Nube (part 1)	July 2, 2025	September 24, 2025	13	Studio Kai	Based on the manga series by Shō Makura and Takeshi Okano.	
6	IM	Fermat Kitchen	July 5, 2025	September 27, 2025	12	Domerica	Based on the manga series by Yūgo Kobayashi.	
7	IM	The Banished Court Magician Aims to Become the Strongest	October 4, 2025	December 20, 2025	12	Gekkou	Based on the light novel series by Alto and Yuunagi.	
8	IM W	Wandance	October 8, 2025	December 24, 2025	12	Madhouse; Cyclone Graphics	Based on the manga series by Coffee.	
9	IM W	Hell Teacher: Jigoku Sensei Nube (part 2)	January 7, 2026	March 25, 2026	13	Studio Kai	Second part of Hell Teacher: Jigoku Sensei Nube.	
10	IM	Dead Account	January 10, 2026	March 28, 2026	12	SynergySP	Based on the manga series by Shizumu Watanabe.	
11	IM	Akane-banashi	April 4, 2026	June 20, 2026	12	Zexcs	Based on the manga series by Yuki Suenaga and Takamasa Moue.	
12	IM W	Gals Can't Be Kind to Otaku!?	April 8, 2026	June 24, 2026	12	TMS Entertainment	Based on the manga series by Norishiro-chan and Sakana Uozumi.	
13	IM	Jaadugar: A Witch in Mongolia	July 4, 2026	September 12, 2026	12	Science Saru	Based on the manga series by Tomato Soup.	
14	IM W	From Old Country Bumpkin to Master Swordsman (season 2)	July 8, 2026	September 23, 2026	12	Passione; Hayabusa Film	Sequel to From Old Country Bumpkin to Master Swordsman.	
15	IM	I'm Looking for a Zombie	October 3, 2026	TBA	TBA	Studio Comet	Based on the manga series by Katsuwo.	
16	IM W	Magic Knight Rayearth	October 7, 2026	TBA	TBA	E&H Production	Based on the manga series by Clamp.	
TBA	IM	Akane-banashi (season 2)	January 2027	TBA	TBA	Zexcs	Sequel to Akane-banashi.	
TBA	IM	Fate Rewinder	April 2027	TBA	TBA	Bones Film	Based on the manga series by Fūta Kimura.	

== See also ==
- Late-night anime programming blocks in Japan
- Other anime programming blocks by ANN
  - NUMAnimation, airing on Sunday mornings
  - Animazing!!!, airing on Sunday mornings
