= Masaya Tokuhiro =

Japanese manga artist

Masaya Tokuhiro (徳弘正也, Tokuhiro Masaya) is a Japanese manga artist working for various magazines within the Shueisha lines, including Weekly Shōnen Jump and Super Jump. Born in Ōtoyo in the prefecture of Kōchi on March 1, 1959, he originally got notice from a placing entry in the 17th Akatsuka Award for his story Bijō wa Niku-Ryori ga Tokui (美女は肉料理がお得意) in 1982. His first series, Shape Up Ran (シェイプアップ乱), soon followed, running between 1983 and 1985 in Weekly Shōnen Jump and quickly established him as not only a gag manga artist but one who balanced in dramatic elements into his stories as well. His most well known work, Jungle King Tar-chan (ジャングルの王者 ターちゃん♡) (a bizarre take on Edgar Rice Burroughs' famous jungle hero Tarzan), became a Weekly Shōnen Jump staple during its run between 1988 and 1995. At the same time as his Weekly Shōnen Jump success, he also had a successful series in Super Jump by way of Fundoshi Police Ken-chan and Chaco-chan (ふんどし刑事ケンちゃんとチャコちゃん), running between 1986 and 1990. Other notable more recent series in the seinen magazine include Kyōshirō 2030 (狂四郎2030) and Showa Eternal Immortal Legend Vampire (昭和不老不死伝説 バンパイア).

Tokuhiro incorporates many of his loves in his stories, including guns, bodybuilding, and muscular physiques (for both males and females) as well as Shorinji Kempo.

One of the few assistants he has used in his work was a young Eiichiro Oda, who has admitted to taking many of the ideas and styles from Tokuhiro but has had little contact with him since those days.

== Works ==
- Shape Up Ran (シェイプアップ乱 Sheipu appu Ran), Weekly Shōnen Jump (1983–1986, 14 volumes)
- Fundoshi Keiji Ken-chan to Chako-chan (ふんどし刑事ケンちゃんとチャコちゃん), Super Jump (1986–1990, 2 volumes)
- Jungle King Tar-chan (ジャングルの王者 ターちゃん♡), Weekly Shōnen Jump (1988–1990, 7 volumes)
  - New Jungle King Tar-chan ((新ジャングルの王者ターちゃん♡)), Weekly Shōnen Jump (1990–1995, 20 volumes)
- Wrestling with Momoko (Wrestling with もも子), Weekly Shōnen Jump (1997, 2 volumes)
- Kyōshirō 2030 (狂四郎2030), Super Jump (1997–2004, 20 volumes)
- Showa Eternal Immortal Legend Vampire (昭和不老不死伝説 バンパイア), Super Jump (2005–2006, 5 volumes)
  - Near-Future Eternal Immortal Legend Vampire (近未来不老不死伝説 バンパイア), Super Jump (2006–2008, 5 volumes)
- Fuguman (ふぐマン), Super Jump ( 2008–2010, 6 volumes)
- Teishu Genki de Inu ga Ii (亭主元気で犬がいい), Big Comic Superior (2010–2013, 8 volumes)
- Kōmon-sama - Suke-san no Yūutsu (黄門さま〜助さんの憂鬱〜), Grand Jump (2013–2015, 6 volumes)
- Mokkori Hanbei (もっこり半兵衛), Grand Jump PREMIUM (2015 - present)
