= Reibaishi Izuna =

Japanese manga series

- Reibaishi Izuna: The Spiritual Medium
- First tankōbon volume cover, featuring Izuna Hazuki

現代都市妖鬼考 霊媒師いずな ～the spiritual medium～ (Gendai Toshi Yōkikō Reibaishi Izuna Za Supirichuaru Mediumu)
- Manga
- Written by: Shō Makura
- Illustrated by: Takeshi Okano
- Published by: Shueisha
- Magazine: Oh Super Jump (2007–2010); Super Jump (2007–2011)
- Original run: July 18, 2007 – October 12, 2011
- Volumes: 10
- Manga

Reibaishi Izuna: Ascension
- Written by: Shō Makura
- Illustrated by: Takeshi Okano
- Published by: Shueisha
- Magazine: Grand Jump (2011–2014); Grand Jump Premium (2014–2016)
- Original run: November 16, 2011 – June 22, 2016
- Volumes: 10
- icon

Reibaishi Izuna: The Spiritual Medium (Japanese: 現代都市妖鬼考 霊媒師いずな ～the spiritual medium～, Hepburn: Gendai Toshi Yōkikō Reibaishi Izuna Za Supirichuaru Mediumu) is a Japanese manga series written by Shō Makura and illustrated by Takeshi Okano. It is a spin-off to Makura and Okano's Hell Teacher: Jigoku Sensei Nube. It was serialized in Shueisha's Oh Super Jump (2007–2010) and Super Jump (2007–2011), with its chapters collected in ten tankōbon volumes. A sequel, titled Reibaishi Izuna: Ascension, was serialized in Grand Jump (2011–2014) and Grand Jump Premium (2014–2016), with its chapters collected in another ten tankōbon volumes.

== Plot ==
In modern Japan, societal issues grow increasingly severe. Behind the scenes, violent accidents and sudden, inexplicable changes in human behavior suggest the influence of malevolent spirits. Unbeknownst to the public, certain individuals with supernatural abilities work in secret to resolve these paranormal incidents and protect the country from vengeful entities. Among them is the young spirit medium, Izuna Hazuki, who operates in a city plagued by concentrated supernatural activity. For a substantial fee, she aids those tormented by evil spirits, continuing her unseen battle against the forces of darkness.

== Publication ==
Written by Shō Makura and illustrated by Takeshi Okano, Reibaishi Izuna: The Spiritual Medium started in Shueisha's seinen manga magazine Oh Super Jump on July 18, 2007. (Note: It debuted in the magazine's August 2007 issue, released on July 18 of that same year.) It was also occasionally published in Super Jump, starting on November 28, 2007. Oh Super Jump ceased publication on July 20, 2010, and the series was formally transferred to Super Jump on September 8 of that same year. The series finished in the last issue of the magazine, released on October 12, 2011. Shueisha collected its chapters in ten tankōbon volumes, released from August 4, 2008, and December 2, 2011.

The manga would continue in Shueisha's newly magazine Grand Jump; it was continued as a direct sequel, titled Reibaishi Izuna: Ascension (霊媒師いずな Ascension, Reibaishi Izuna Asenshon), on November 16, 2011. Its last chapter in the magazine was published on July 2, 2014, and the series was then transferred to Grand Jump Premium on August 27 of the same year. The series finished on June 22, 2016. Ten tankōbon volumes were published between April 19, 2012, and December 2, 2016.

=== The Spiritual Medium ===
No.	Release date	ISBN
1	August 4, 2008	978-4-08-859723-2
1. I Didn't Do It! (おれはやってない！, Ore wa yattenai!); 2. Demon Fire (鬼火, Onibi); 3. The Happy Slave (幸福な奴隷, Kōfuku na dorei); 4. I Want to See (見たい, Mitai); 5. Room Lady (ルームレディ, Rūmu Redi); 6. Life (命, Inochi)
2	January 5, 2009	978-4-08-859753-9
7. My Wife's Scary! (嫁が怖い!, Yome ga kowai!); 8. The Mysterious Girl (謎の少女, Nazo no shōjo); 9. Awahime Returns Home (泡姫、故郷に帰る, Awahime, furusato ni kaeru); 10. The Gecko Woman (やもり女, Yamori onna); 11. A Small Bar (小さな酒場, Chiisana sakaba); 12. Summoning (口寄せ, Kuchiyose)
3	June 4, 2009	978-4-08-859780-5
13. Christmas Eve Miracle (聖夜の奇蹟, Seiya no kiseki); 14. The Darkness of the Dating Café (出会い喫茶の闇, Deai kissa no yami); 15. Smoker's Nightmare (スモーカーの悪夢, Sumōkā no akumu); 16. The Fate of Judgment (裁きの行方, Sabaki no yukue); 17. I Want to Get Married!! (結婚したい!!, Kekkon shitai!!); 18. Pachinko Rhapsody (パチンコ狂想曲, Pachinko kyōsōkyoku)
4	December 4, 2009	978-4-08-859812-3
19. The Healing Forest (癒しの森, Iyashi no mori); 20. Hope (希望, Kibō); 21. The Cursed AV Tape (呪いのAV, Noroi no AV); 22. Nightmare Hospital (悪夢の病院, Akumu no byōin); 23. Satori Hot Springs (サトリの湯, Satori no yu); 24. Sweet Infidelity (甘い不倫, Amai furin); 25. Faceless (顔ナシ, Kao-nashi)
5	April 2, 2010	978-4-08-859831-4
26. Misaki Mound (ミサキ塚, Misaki-zuka); 27. The Phantom House (幻の家, Maboroshi no ie); 28. The First Visitor (初めての訪問者, Hajimete no hōmonsha); 29. Cell Phone Phobia (ケータイ恐怖症, Kētai kyōfushō); 30. The Elevator Dweller (エレベーターの住人, Erebētā no jūnin); 31. Here Comes the Old Lady (おばばさま、来たる, Obaba-sama, kitaru); 32. The Demon Section Chief and the Office Lady (鬼課長とOL, Oni kachō to OL)
6	August 4, 2010	978-4-08-859848-2
33. Exorcism (エクソシズム, Ekusoshizumu); 34. The Old Man and the Garbage (老人とゴミ, Rōjin to gomi); 35. Fateful Encounter – Dedicated to My Father (邂逅-父に捧ぐ-, Kaikō – chichi ni sasagu); 36. Job Hunting! (シューカツ!, Shūkatsu!); 37. Sasei and Izuna (沙聖といずな, Sasei to Izuna); 38. The Slit-Mouth Woman (口裂け女, Kuchisake-onna); 39. The Corrupt Idol (汚れたアイドル, Yogoreta aidoru)
7	December 3, 2010	978-4-08-859863-5
40. The Man Who Cannot Return (帰れない男, Kaerenai otoko); 41. The Third Psychic (第3の霊能力者, Dai-san no reinōryokusha); 42. The Girl Waiting for God (神を待つ少女, Kami o matsu shōjo); 43. Izuma and Rin (いずなとリン, Izuna to Rin); 44. The Mound of Black Hair (黒髪塚, Kurokami-zuka); 45. Izuna and Her Merry Companions (いずなと愉快な仲間たち, Izuna to yukai na nakama-tachi); 46. Descent of the Buddha (仏降ろし, Hotoke-oroshi); Special one-shot. Professor Makura's Paranormal Experiences (?) (まくら先生の心霊体験(?), Makura-sensei no shinrei taiken (?))
8	May 2, 2011	978-4-08-859880-2
47. Online Game Addict (ネトゲ廃人, Netoge haijin); 48. Izuna the Murderer (Part 1) (殺人鬼いずな (前編), Satsujinki Izuna (zenpen)); 49. Izuna the Murderer (Part 2) (殺人鬼いずな (後編), Satsujinki Izuna (kōhen)); 50. The Little Old Man (小さいおじさん, Chiisai ojisan); 51. Notsugo's Tears (ノツゴの涙, Notsugo no namida); 52. Chikara the Ritualist (拝み屋・千佳羅, Ogamiya Chikara); 53. The Return of the Old Lady (オババさま再臨, Obaba-sama sairin); 54. A Couple in Crisis (ある夫婦の危機, Aru fūfu no kiki)
9	September 2, 2011	978-4-08-859896-3
55. Izuna's “Justice” (いずなの「正義」, Izuna no "seigi"); 56. Izuna's Conflict (いずなの葛藤, Izuna no kattō); 57. Izuna's Way (いずなのやり方, Izuna no yarikata); 58. Femme Fatale (ファム・ファタール, Famu fatāru); 59. The Freezing Right Arm (凍りつく右腕, Kōritsuku migi ude); 60. First Love (初恋, Hatsukoi); 61. Hero (ヒーロー, Hīrō); 62. Black Darkness (黒い闇, Kuroi yami)
10	December 2, 2011	978-4-08-858777-6
63. Oni of Vicious Deeds (駄業鬼, Dagyōki); 64. Division of the Kudan (クダ分け, Kuda-wake); 65. Occult Cute Mare (オカルト・キュート・メア, Okaruto Kyūto Mea); 66. Exorcist Exam (エクソシスト審査, Ekusoshisuto shinsa); 67. Babies Are the Best!! (赤ちゃんサイコー!!, Akachan saikō!!); 68. Izuna in Okinawa (いずな in 沖縄, Izuna in Okinawa); 69. Sadaka (サーダカー, Sādakā); 70. Northern Itako and Southern Yuta (北のイタコ 南のユタ, Kita no itako minami no yuta)

=== Ascension ===
No.	Release date	ISBN
1	April 19, 2012	978-4-08-879341-2
1. I Want to Go Back to That Day (あの日にかえりたい, Ano hi ni kaeritai); 2. Rin's Growth (リンの成長, Rin no seichō); 3. A Bouquet for the Old Pervert (エロジジイに花束を, Ero jijii ni hanataba o); 4. Psychic Investigation (霊能力捜査, Reinōryoku sōsa); 5. Showing Everything to Everyone!? (みんな見せちゃう!?, Minna misecchau!?); 6. The Price of Success (成功の対価, Seikō no taika); 7. Chikara, the Curse Exterminator (呪殺師・千佳羅, Jusatsushi Chikara); 8. Evil Person (悪人, Akunin)
2	August 17, 2012	978-4-08-879404-4
9. Dream Exorcism (夢祓い, Yume-harai); 10. The Man Who Became a Magician (魔法使いになった男, Mahōtsukai ni natta otoko); 11. Rei the Vampire (吸血鬼レイ, Kyūketsuki Rei); 12. The Death Futon (臨終布団, Rinjū buton); 13. Miss Luna's Boyfriend (ルナさんの恋人, Runa-san no koibito); 14. My Wife Is a Kunoichi!? (奥さまは くのいち!?, Okusama wa kunoichi!?); 15. Why Can't I Get Married?! (なんで結婚できないんだ!?, Nande kekkon dekinai nda!?); 16. The True Nature of the Nightmare (悪夢の正体, Akumu no shōtai)
3	December 19, 2012	978-4-08-879491-4
17. What I Desired… (望みしものは…, Nozomishi mono wa…); 18. Reunion of Betrayal (裏切りの再会, Uragiri no saikai); 19. The Price of the Curse (呪いの代償, Noroi no daishō); 20. Unstoppable Feelings (止まらぬ想い, Tomaranu omoi); 21. Black Company (ブラック企業, Burakku kigyō); 22. Subway Idol (地下アイドル, Chika aidoru); 23. The Vampire's Love (吸血鬼の恋, Kyūketsuki no koi); 24. Fake Izuna (フェイクいずな, Feiku Izuna)
4	May 17, 2013	978-4-08-879491-4
25. Mobile Nightmare (モバイル悪夢, Mobairu akumu); 26. Merry Christmas of the Mediums (霊媒師たちのメリークリスマス, Reibai-shi-tachi no Merī Kurisumasu); 27. I Want to Punch Him! (ぶんなぐりたい!, Bunnaguritai!); 28. Atonement (償い, Tsugunai); 29. Entrance Exam Monster (お受験モンスター, Ojuken monsutā); 30. Let's Get a Lover! (愛人を作ろう!, Aijin o tsukurō!); 31. Hasshaku-sama (Part 1) (八尺様 (前編), Hasshaku-sama (zenpen)); 32. Hasshaku-sama (Part 2) (八尺様 (後編), Hasshaku-sama (kōhen))
5	September 19, 2013	978-4-08-879657-4
33. Bridal War (ブライダル・ウォー, Buraidaru Wō); 34. Inugami (狗神, Inugami); 35. Idle Youths (しない若者, Shinai wakamono); 36. The Escort to Departure (送り人, Okuribito); 37. Yōkai Assistant (妖怪ヘルパー, Yōkai herupā); 38. Secret Feelings (密かな想い, Hisoka na omoi); 39. Heartbreak (ハートブレイク, Hātobureiku); 40. The Self-Harming Woman and the Mysterious Doctor (自傷女と謎の医者, Jishō onna to nazo no isha)
6	April 18, 2014	978-4-08-879778-6
41. Minocchi Appears! (ミノッチー現る!, Minocchī arawaru!); 42. Yamanoke (ヤマノケ, Yamanoke); 43. Rei the Vampire: Where Love Leads (吸血鬼レイ 恋のゆくえ, Kyūketsuki Rei: koi no yukue); 44. Whose Child Is This!? (この子 誰の子!?, Kono ko dare no ko!?); 45. Rin and…… (リンと……, Rin to……); 46. Terrorist (テロリスト, Terorisuto); 47. The King of Emptiness (虚無の王, Kyomu no ō); 48. The Final Showdown (決着, Kecchaku)
7	October 3, 2014	978-4-08-879894-3
49. A Cinematic Guy (シネマな彼, Shinema na kare); 50. The Poison Called “Mother” (「母」という毒, "Haha" to iu doku); 51. Take Down the Harassing Boss! (セクハラ上司をぶっとばせ!, Sekuhara jōshi o butto base!); 52. Tears of the Dark Spider (闇蜘蛛の涙, Yami-gumo no namida); 53. Itona Awakens (糸奈覚醒, Ito-na kakusei); 54. Family…? (家族…?, Kazoku…?); 55. The Hidden Bond (隠された絆, Kakusareta kizuna); 56. Towards the Past…! (過去へ…!, Kako e…!)
8	October 17, 2014	978-4-08-890016-2
57. The Infernal Professor of a Parallel World (並行世界の地獄先生, Heikō sekai no jigoku sensei); 58. Teachings of the Master (恩師の教え, Onshi no oshie); 59. Misaligned Timeline (ずれた時間軸, Zureta jikanjiku); 60. An Unknown Lover (見知らぬ恋人, Mishiranu koibito); 61. Searching for Memories (思い出をさがして, Omoide o sagashite); Special one-shot. Chikara, the Curse Exterminator – Piranha (呪殺師 千佳羅-ピラニア-, Jusatsushi Chikara – Pirania); Special one-shot. Chikara, the Curse Exterminator – Death Highway (呪殺師 千佳羅-死のハイウェイ-, Jusatsushi Chikara – Shi no haiwei)
9	October 19, 2015	978-4-08-890287-6
62. I Want to Stand Out! (目立ちたい!, Medachitai!); 63. The Returning Grudge (廻る怨み, Mawaru urami); 64. The Best Retirement Gift (最高の退職祝い, Saikō no taishoku iwai); 65. Dangerous Drugs (危険ドラッグ, Kiken doraggu); 66. Chikara's Past (千佳羅の過去, Chikara no kako); 67. Smile! (笑って!, Waratte!)
10	December 2, 2016	978-4-08-890558-7
68. Drone Attack! (ドローン襲撃!, Dorōn shūgeki!); 69. Another Life (もうひとつの人生, Mō hitotsu no jinsei); 70. The Voice of the Soul (魂の声, Tamashii no koe); 71. The Day of Collision (激突の日, Gekitotsu no hi); 72. Please Don't Forget the Day I Came to You… (私があなたのもとに来た日をどうかわすれないで…, Watashi ga anata no moto ni kita hi o dōka wasurenaide…); 73. The End of Evil (悪の終焉, Aku no shūen)
