= Hell Teacher: Jigoku Sensei Nube =

Japanese manga series and its adaptations

- First tankōbon volume cover, featuring Meisuke Nueno (front), Makoto Kurita (right), Kyouko Inaba (top right), and Hiroshi Tateno (left)

地獄先生ぬ〜べ〜 (Jigoku Sensei Nūbē)
- Genre: Action; Comedy horror; Dark fantasy
- Manga
- Written by: Shō Makura
- Illustrated by: Takeshi Okano
- Published by: Shueisha
- Imprint: Jump Comics
- Magazine: Weekly Shōnen Jump
- Original run: August 24, 1993 – May 11, 1999
- Volumes: 31
Further information
Anime television series
Nube
Directed by	Yukio Kaizawa
Produced by	Taro Iwamoto (TV Asahi); Atsushi Kaji (TV Asahi); Tetsuya Watanabe (Dentsu); Nobutaka Nishizawa
Written by	Sukehiro Tomita
Music by	BMF
Studio	Toei Animation
Original network	ANN (TV Asahi)
Original run	April 13, 1996 – August 7, 1997
Episodes	49
Anime film
Directed by	Junji Shimizu
Produced by	Hiroyuki Sakurada
Written by	Sukehiro Tomita
Studio	Toei Animation
Released	July 6, 1996
Runtime	48 minutes
Anime film
Jigoku Sensei Nūbē: Gozen 0 toki Nūbē Shisu
Directed by	Yukio Kaizawa
Produced by	Hiroyuki Sakurada
Written by	Takao Koyama
Studio	Toei Animation
Released	March 8, 1997
Runtime	45 minutes
Anime film
Jigoku Sensei Nūbē: Kyoufu no Natsu Yasumi! Asashi no Uni no Gensetsu
Directed by	Junji Shimizu
Produced by	Hiroyuki Sakurada
Written by	Yoshiyuki Suga
Studio	Toei Animation
Released	July 12, 1997
Runtime	38 minutes
Original video animation
Directed by	Yukio Kaizawa
Produced by	Takehiko Shimatsu
Music by	Masamichi Amano
Studio	Toei Animation
Released	June 1998 – May 1999
Runtime	30 minutes each
Episodes	3
Manga
Jigoku Sensei Nūbē Neo
Written by	Shō Makura
Illustrated by	Takeshi Okano
Published by	Shueisha
Magazine	Grand Jump Premium (2014); Grand Jump (2014–2018); Saikyō Jump (2016–2018)
Original run	May 28, 2014 – December 5, 2018
Volumes	17
Television drama
Directed by	Noriyoshi Sakuma; Kenji Ikeda
Written by	Magi; Tomoharu Sato
Studio	Nippon Television
Original network	NNS (Nippon TV)
Original run	October 11, 2014 – December 13, 2014
Episodes	10
Manga
Jigoku Sensei Nūbē S
Written by	Shō Makura
Illustrated by	Takeshi Okano
Published by	Shueisha
Magazine	Saikyō Jump
Original run	August 3, 2018 – April 1, 2021
Volumes	4
Manga
Jigoku Sensei Nube Kai
Written by	Shō Makura
Illustrated by	Takeshi Okano
Published by	Shueisha
Magazine	Saikyō Jump
Original run	May 2, 2025 – present
Volumes	2
Manga
Hell Teacher: Jigoku Sensei Nube Plus
Written by	Shō Makura
Illustrated by	Takeshi Okano
Published by	Shueisha
Magazine	Shōnen Jump+
Original run	May 14, 2025 – June 25, 2025
Volumes	1
Anime television series
Directed by	Yasuyuki Ōishi
Written by	Yoshiki Ōkusa
Music by	Evan Call
Studio	Studio Kai
Licensed by	Remow
Original network	ANN (TV Asahi)
Original run	July 2, 2025 – March 25, 2026
Episodes	26
- Spin-off
- Reibaishi Izuna (2007–2016)
- icon

Hell Teacher: Jigoku Sensei Nube (地獄先生ぬ〜べ〜, Jigoku Sensei Nūbē) is a Japanese manga series written by Shō Makura and illustrated by Takeshi Okano. It was serialized in Shueisha's shōnen manga magazine Weekly Shōnen Jump from August 1993 to May 1999, with its chapters collected in 31 tankōbon volumes. The series follows Meisuke Nueno, aka Nube, the homeroom teacher for Class 5–3 at Dōmori Elementary. More than a teacher, however, he is a skilled exorcist, protecting the town of Dōmori from supernatural threats with strength borrowed from a powerful demon sealed in his left hand—a technique he calls the Demon's Hand.

A 49-episode anime television series, produced by Toei Animation, titled in English simply as Nube, was broadcast on TV Asahi and its affiliates from April 1996 to August 1997. Three movies and three original video animation (OVA) episodes were released. A second anime television series adaptation, produced by Studio Kai, aired in split-cours on the same network, with the first cours aired from July to September 2025, and the second cours aired from January to March 2026.

A spin-off manga series focused on Izuna Hazuki, the itako-girl, Reibaishi Izuna: The Spiritual Medium, was serialized from 2007 to 2011, with a sequel, Reibaishi Izuna: Ascension, published from 2011 to 2016. Other manga sequels to the main series have been released: Jigoku Sensei Nūbē Neo (2014–2018); Jigoku Sensei Nūbē S (2018–2021); Jigoku Sensei Nube Kai (since 2025); and Hell Teacher: Jigoku Sensei Nube Plus (2025).

By December 2025, the overall manga franchise had over 31 million copies in circulation.

== Plot ==
Dōmori Elementary School appears ordinary until supernatural disturbances—often targeting a student from Class 5–3—force teacher Meisuke Nueno (Nube) into action. Using his Demon's Hand or other spiritual abilities, he resolves each incident, sometimes through combat, negotiation, or appeasement. Though largely episodic, the series features recurring antagonists and later introduces longer story arcs. Each case concludes with restored normalcy and a lesson learned.

== Media ==
=== Manga ===
Written by Shō Makura and illustrated by Takeshi Okano, Hell Teacher: Jigoku Sensei Nube was serialized in Shueisha's shōnen manga magazine Weekly Shōnen Jump from August 24, 1993, to May 11, 1999. (Note: It finished in the magazine's 24th issue of 1999, released on May 11 of that same year.) Shueisha collected its 276 chapters in 31 tankōbon volumes, released from January 11, 1994, to September 3, 1999.

==== Spin-offs and other series ====
A spin-off story focused on Izuna Hazuki, the itako-girl, titled Reibaishi Izuna: The Spiritual Medium, was serialized in Oh Super Jump and Super Jump from 2007 to 2011. It was followed by Reibaishi Izuna: Ascension, published in Grand Jump and Grand Jump Premium from 2011 to 2016.

A one-shot chapter, Jigoku Sensei Nūbē: Ōmagatoki (地獄先生ぬ～べ～ 逢魔ヶ刻), was published in Grand Jump on April 2, 2014. A sequel to the original series, Jigoku Sensei Nūbē Neo (地獄先生ぬ〜べ〜NEO), started in Grand Jump Premium on May 28, 2014. It was transferred to Grand Jump on July 16 of the same year. Jigoku Sensei Nūbē Neo was simultaneously serialized in Shueisha's shōnen manga magazine Saikyō Jump from August 5, 2016, to June 1, 2018. The series finished on December 5, 2018. Shueisha collected its chapters in seventeen tankōbon volumes, released from October 3, 2014, to January 4, 2019.

Another series, Jigoku Sensei Nūbē S (地獄先生ぬ〜べ〜S), was serialized in Saikyō Jump from August 3, 2018, to April 1, 2021. It is a sequel to Jigoku Sensei Nūbē Neo. Shueisha collected its chapters in four tankōbon volumes, released from March 4, 2019, to June 4, 2021.

Another series by Makura and Okano, titled Jigoku Sensei Nube Kai (地獄先生ぬ〜べ〜怪), started in Saikyō Jump on May 2, 2025.

Another series by Makura and Okano, titled Hell Teacher: Jigoku Sensei Nube Plus (地獄先生ぬ〜べ〜PLUS), was serialized on the Shōnen Jump+ digital platform from May 14 to June 25, 2025; Shueisha collected its chapters in one tankōbon volume, released on July 4 of the same year. The manga was published in English on the Manga Plus digital service.

=== Anime ===
==== 1996 series ====
A 49-episode anime television series adaptation, produced by Toei Animation, was broadcast on TV Asahi between April 13, 1996, and August 7, 1997. The opening theme is "Bari Bari Saikyou no. 1" (バリバリ最強No.1), performed by Feel So Bad. The first ending theme is "Mienai Chikara: Invisible One" (ミエナイチカラ～Invisible One～), performed by B'z, and the second ending is "Spirit", performed by Pamelah.

==== 2025 series ====
In July 2024, a new anime television series adaptation was announced. It is produced by Studio Kai and directed by Yasuyuki Ōishi, with Yoshiki Ōkusa handling series composition, Yū Yoshiyama designing the characters, and Evan Call composing the music. The series, airing in split-cours, aired its first cours from July 2 to September 24, 2025, and the second cours aired from January 7 to March 25, 2026, on the brand new IMAnimation W programming block on TV Asahi and its affiliates. For the first cours, the opening theme song is "P0WER-AkuryoTaisan-" (P0WER-悪霊退散-), performed by Shintenchi Kaibyaku Shudan: Zigzag, while the ending theme song is "Sunflower" (ひまわり, Himawari), performed by Chilli Beans. For the second cours, the opening theme song is "Erase", performed by the Oral Cigarettes, while the ending theme song is "Magical", performed by Ayumu Imazu.

Remow licensed the series for streaming on the "It's Anime" YouTube channel in selected territories, including North America alongside other platforms, such as Netflix in Asian territories (except China).

=== Films ===
Three movies have been released. The first movie Jigoku Sensei Nūbē was released on July 6, 1996. A second anime film titled, Jigoku Sensei Nūbē: Gozen 0 toki Nūbē Shisu, premiered on March 8, 1997. The third anime film titled Jigoku Sensei Nūbē: Kyoufu no Natsu Yasumi! Asashi no Uni no Gensetsu premiered on July 12, 1997.

=== Original video animations ===
Three original video animations (OVAs) were released. The first OVA Kessen! Yōjin no Jutsu VS Kabeo was released in June 1998. The second OVA Nazonazo Nana Fushigi – Bukimi-chan was released in July 1998. The third OVA Shijō saidai no gekisen! Zekki raishū!! was released in May 1999.

=== Video games ===
A video game was released by Bandai for the PlayStation on May 16, 1997. Nube and Yukime became support characters in the 2006 Nintendo DS game Jump Ultimate Stars, with Hiroshi and Kyoko as help characters. Nūbē later appeared as a playable character in the 2014 PlayStation 3/PlayStation Vita game J-Stars Victory VS.

=== Drama ===
A ten-episode television drama adaptation was broadcast on Nippon TV from October 11 to December 13, 2014. The cast includes Ryuhei Maruyama as Nūbē, Mirei Kiritani as Ritsuko Takahashi, Mokomichi Hayami as Kyōsuke Tamamo, Mizuki Yamamoto as Izuna Hazuki, Hideki Takahashi as Mugenkai Jikū and Kang Ji-young as Yukime.

== Reception and legacy ==
By December 2014, the manga had 24 million copies in circulation. By August 2023, the manga (including its spin-offs) had over 28 million copies in circulation; over 29 million copies in circulation by July 2024; and over 31 million copies in circulation by December 2025.

Manga artist Hajime Isayama stated that the character Man-Eating Mona Lisa from the series was one of the inspirations for the Titans in his Attack on Titan manga series.
