= Jungle King Tar-chan =

Japanese manga series

- First tankōbon volume cover

ジャングルの王者 ターちゃん♡ (Janguru no Ōja Tā-chan)
- Genre: Action, comedy
- Manga
- Written by: Masaya Tokuhiro
- Published by: Shueisha
- Imprint: Jump Comics Deluxe
- Magazine: Weekly Shōnen Jump
- Original run: March 21, 1988 – June 11, 1990
- Volumes: 7
- Manga

New Jungle King Tar-chan
- Written by: Masaya Tokuhiro
- Published by: Shueisha
- Imprint: Jump Comics
- Magazine: Weekly Shōnen Jump
- Original run: June 18, 1990 – April 17, 1995
- Volumes: 20
- Anime television series
- Directed by: Hitoshi Nanba
- Produced by: Keisuke Iwata; Toshihiko Fujinami; Shūji Imai; Katsutoshi Kanesaka
- Written by: Jinzō Toriumi; Gō Suzuki
- Music by: Naoki Yamada
- Studio: Group TAC
- Original network: TV Tokyo
- Original run: October 14, 1993 – September 29, 1994
- Episodes: 50
- Video game
- Publisher: Bandai
- Genre: Action
- Released: July 29, 1994
- Video game

Great World Tour Brawl
- Publisher: Bandai
- Genre: Action
- Released: September 18, 1994
- icon

Jungle King Tar-chan (Japanese: ジャングルの王者ターちゃん, Hepburn: Janguru no Ōja Tā-chan) is a Japanese manga series written and illustrated by Masaya Tokuhiro. The manga was serialized in Shueisha's shōnen manga magazine Weekly Shōnen Jump from March 1988 to June 1990; midway through serialization, its title was changed to New Jungle King Tar-chan, and continued until April 1995. The overall series' chapters were collected in 27 tankōbon volumes.

The manga was adapted into a 50-episode anime television series produced by Group TAC, broadcast on TV Tokyo between October 1993 and September 1994.

== Plot ==
The series is about Tar-chan, a young man who was raised in the African savanna by the chimpanzee Etekichi, and his adventures protecting his home, his wife Jane, and his animal friends. As the series progresses, the simple episodic gag premise is switched to a fighting premise. Although long battles and emotional development began to unfold, after the end of these battles, the series would return to its gag style, switching back to the fighting style with each new battle.

Although the story is called Jungle King Tar-chan, Tar-chan and his friends actually live on a savanna, and a jungle setting is never actually used.

== Characters ==
Tar-chan (ターちゃん, Tā-chan)
Voiced by: Gorō Kishitani
Tar-chan is a young man who was raised in the African wild. His address is: African Savanna, Three Trees 7-4-10. He was abandoned in the savanna as a baby and found and raised by Etekichi. Other than this his past is unknown. Though there are often many humorous flashbacks to his past, whether or not any of them are true is unclear. Tar-chan's hobby is cooking, and his specialty dish is eggplant with mustard and misozuke. He is a dangerous drunk. He loves nature and animals and protects them from poachers. He can imitate the special abilities and speak the language of various animals, because he was raised by animals himself. With his superhuman reflexes and strength, he is a well-known fighter around the world, yet he is usually forced by his wife Jane to do the cleaning and supply the food. He does not seem interested in protecting his reputation as a grappler though; only in protecting the peace of the jungle.
When Tar-chan first met Jane he could not speak human language well. He was able to master submission holds after reading a fighting book for only one night, which demonstrates amazing mental ability. However, he still lacks general common sense. Tar-chan has super human abilities and strength and typically fights with his bare hands, but there are times when he will use weapons such as a blowgun and boomerang. He also has superhuman recovery, and has been known to recover quickly from injuries that take a normal man several weeks to recover from. When he takes on too much damage, he powers up by defecating, known as Poop Power Up (うんこひりパワーアップ, Unkohiri Pawā Appu). His body is extremely flexible, and he can bend backwards to lick his own buttocks. Additionally, he can stretch the skin of his scrotum to glide, in a manner similar to a Japanese giant flying squirrel.
Although he is a brave man who cannot ignore those in danger, he is also an incredible pervert and treasures his many pornographic magazines left behind by tourists, which he collects. However, he said "to react to a beautiful girl is the instinct of the average man, the only one I truly love is Jane".
Jane (ヂェーン, Jēn)
Voiced by: Miki Narahashi
A former playmate of Tar-chan's and now his wife, when she was 17 she traveled to Africa for a photo shoot and fell in love with Tar-chan. After marrying Tar-chan she became so comfortable with living in the wild that she eventually became fat.
Jane is the brains of the Tar-chan Family, having taught human language to Tar-chan and often taking part in the planning of fights. She can speak French, Russian, Chinese, and several other languages. She can also understand the Chimpanzee language and she communicates with Etekichi. She is capable of beating up Tar-chan and the others (as a gag), but is also shown to be strong enough to defend herself. She will do anything to make money and always bets on Tar-chan and Pedro during tournaments. She is saving money to open up a wildlife protection company.
Jane is a lacto-vegetarian. She is also seen eating candy and manjū, implying she is not too picky with food. At one point she is given special pills from Renhou that make her thin again, but becomes fat once again after receiving medical treatment for a near-fatal injury. Afterwards she bears Tar-chan 12 children: 6 boys and 6 girls. She reappears in the short story "Jane's Fruit Diet".
Etekichi (エテ吉)
Voiced by: Kappei Yamaguchi
Etekichi is a chimpanzee who found and raised Tar-chan as a stepson and friend. At the beginning of the series Tar-chan refers to him as "father," but after it is discovered that he left his wife Eteko, he begins calling him by his actual name. Although he is a chimpanzee he often acts more intelligently than some of the important human characters. He even occasionally speaks, but always as a gag. He enjoys masturbating and having intercourse with all types of female monkeys. In the anime, episode titles were read by Kappei Yamaguchi in Etekichi's voice.
Gori-san (ゴリさん)
Gori-san is a mountain gorilla who taught Tar-chan how to fight. He is very gentle and kind, and like Etekichi is smarter than an ordinary gorilla, although unlike Etekichi he cannot talk.
Anabebe (アナベベ)
Voiced by: Kōji Ishii
Anabebe is Tar-chan's best friend. He is a member of Africa's strongest warrior clan, the Upopo Clan, and is the only person considered Tar-chan's equal. He at one time fought with Tar-chan over Jane, but gave up after seeing how fat she had become. His tribe later awarded him with the homely Zubeta (ズベタ) as a wife. Anabebe was at one time a stoic warrior, but after winning the Yunker Empire Tournament, he becomes rich and is more of a gag character. He even builds a mansion in the middle of the savanna. The mansion is heavily guarded with dobermans in the garden, and Anabebe says they are to keep lions and cheetahs from entering. After winning the tournament, he began to show signs of cowardice, running from strong opponents. Although his abilities are quite good, he usually loses. The Upopo law forbids him from using weapons or cowardly techniques.
Although his tribal law states he must take his own life if defeated, he never does. Eventually he goes bankrupt and returns to his poor warrior ways.
Pedro Kazmaier (ペドロ・カズマイヤー, Pedoro Kazumaiyā)
Voiced by: Nobuyuki Hiyama
Pedro Kazmaier is a French Karate Champion and Tar-chan's first apprentice. He is 188 cm tall and weighs 109 kg. His hobby is studying Karate, and his specialty attack is the Spinning Back Kick. He deeply respects Tar-chan from the bottom of his heart and is impressed with his every action. His catchphrase is;Osoreirimashita (おそれいりました; "I'm impressed"). Initially he wishes to defeat Tar-chan in order to become famous, but he comes to respect his inhuman power and forcibly becomes his disciple. He was abandoned by a child at an orphanage and later adopted by a rich family who often sends him books and cognac. He is very serious and stubborn but a late bloomer when it comes to love.
In addition to Karate, he also knows Judo, and various other arts. His skill as a fighter is rather high, but according to Tar-chan he cannot handle people outside his weight class, and in fact usually loses against such opponents. He tends to hide behind the strength of Tar-chan and Ryō-shihan, but his true strength and capability is displayed in the fight against the Seikaken 4. In the vampire story arc, he briefly becomes a vampire but retains the increase in power after becoming human again.
Ryō-shihan (梁師範; "Master Ryō")
Voiced by: Kiyoyuki Yanada
Master Ryō is a 28-year-old master of Hakkaken (白華拳; "White Flower Fist"), one of the Western School 32 Styles (西派32門派, Nishiha 32 Monha). He has a moustache and scars on his face, abdomen, and buttocks. His hobby is Mahjong.
Master Ryō is in love with the head, Renhou, and enters the Chinese tournament because the law of the 32 Western Schools forbids them from getting married unless he proves Hakkaken is the most powerful style. After the tournament he joins Tar-chan's family in order to marry her, saying now they are from different schools. Of the main characters he is the most serious and a bit rude, but after his friendship with the Family deepens he comes a kinder character. He also has the same level of perverseness as Tar-chan. Like Pedro, he briefly becomes a vampire in the vampire story arc, and retains the power up after returning to human form. He later marries Renhou and often returns to China to visit her. After their son is born he begins to show a doting parental side to his personality. He has several ki based attacks, such as the Hyappo Shinken and the Ryuuenken. His skills as a fighter are top class, and he is one of few people capable of teaming up with Tar-chan in battle.
Helen Noguchi (ヘレン野口, Heren Noguchi)
Voiced by: Kotono Mitsuishi
Helen Noguchi is a 16-year-old girl who is saved by Tar-chan from a crocodile. She is half Japanese and half American. Initially she is a rather bold character who is searching for summer experience and plans to let Tar-chan take her virginity, but she later becomes friends with both him and Jane and teaches them how to manage a rice field. She was Tar-chan's biggest fan, but switched to Pedro after first seeing him. She stops appearing soon after New Jungle King Tar-chan began, but suddenly reappears for the final story as a full grown woman. In the anime her love interest is Pedro, but in the manga she marries Chikō.
Chikō (智光)
After Ryō-shihan returns to China, Chikō is sent to protect the Tar-chan Family in his place. He is a pervert but also a master healer. He is also good at Chinese cooking. His abnormal personality and love of cleanliness clashes with Jane.

== Media ==
=== Manga ===
Written and illustrated by Masaya Tokuhiro, Jungle King Tar-chan was serialized in Shueisha's shōnen manga magazine Weekly Shōnen Jump from March 21, 1988, to June 11, 1990. Midway through its serialization, the title of the series was changed to New Jungle King Tar-chan (新ジャングルの王者ターちゃん, Shin Janguru no Ōja Tā-chan), and was serialize from June 18, 1990, to April 17, 1995. Shueisha collected the Jungle King Tar-chan chapters in seven tankōbon volumes, released from October 7, 1988, to January 10, 1991. Shueisha collected the New Jungle King Tar-chan chapters in 20 tankōbon volumes, released from February 8, 1991, to July 4, 1995. Shueisha republished the series in a bunkoban edition; Jungle King Tar-chan was released in three volumes published between October 16 and November 18, 2009, and New Jungle King Tar-chan in twelve volumes published between December 15, 2009, and October 15, 2010.

=== Anime ===
A 50-episode anime television series adaptation produced by Group TAC was broadcast on TV Tokyo from October 14, 1993, to September 29, 1994. In December 2014, it was announced that the series would be released on two DVD box sets by TC Entertainment. The first volume was released on March 27, 2015, and the second volume on April 24. TC Entertainment later re-released the series into two BD Discs between October 27 and November 24, 2017. The two opening songs "Shape of the Heart" (HEARTの形状, Hāto no Katachi) and "mama I Love You" are performed by B∀G. The first ending "Virgin Land" is performed by Ann Lewis, the second ending "Misty Heartbreak" is performed by access and the third ending "Jingle Jungle Dance" is performed by Ann Lewis.

==== Episodes ====
No.	Title	Original release date
1	"It's the Jungle King"; Transliteration: "Janguru no Ōja da no maki" (ジャングルの王者だの巻)	October 14, 1993
2	"Jungle Style Sumo"; Transliteration: "Janguru-ryū Sumō no maki" (ジャングル流相撲の巻)	October 14, 1993
3	"Super Powerful Tar-chan"; Transliteration: "Chō Noruryoku Tā-chan no maki" (超能力ターちゃんの巻)	October 21, 1993
4	"Musasabi Flying Technique"; Transliteration: "Musasabi Hikōjutsu no maki" (ムササビ飛行術の巻)	October 28, 1993
5	"Pedro's Introduction"; Transliteration: "Pedora Nyūmon no maki" (ペドロ入門の巻)	November 4, 1993
6	"The Diamond is Who's"; Transliteration: "Daiyamondo wa Dare no Mono no maki" (ダイヤモンドは誰の物の巻)	November 11, 1993
7	"Ambition of the Black Dragon Fist"; Transliteration: "Kokuryū Ken no Yabō no maki" (黒龍拳の野望の巻)	November 18, 1993
8	"The Dreadful Western Fist"; Transliteration: "Osorubeki Nishi-ha Ken no maki" (恐るべき西派拳の巻)	November 25, 1993
9	"How Cruel! The Black Dragon Fist Trap"; Transliteration: "Hidou! Kokuryū Ken no Wana no maki" (非道! 黒龍拳の罠の巻)	December 2, 1993
10	"The Sad Law of the Western Fist"; Transliteration: "Nishi-ha Ken no Kanashiki Okite no maki" (西派拳の悲しき掟の巻)	December 9, 1993
11	"The Life Risking Showdown"; Transliteration: "Inochi wo Kaketa Kessen no maki" (命を賭けた決戦の巻)	December 16, 1993
12	"Fierce Attack! Black Dragon Fist"; Transliteration: "Moushū! Kokuryū Ken no maki" (猛襲! 黒龍拳の巻)	December 23, 1993
13	"Jungle Power Explosion"; Transliteration: "Janguru Pawā Bakuhatsu no maki" (ジャングルパワー爆発の巻)	January 6, 1994
14	"At the End of the Battle"; Transliteration: "Tatakai no Hate ni no maki" (戦いの果てにの巻)	January 13, 1994
15	"The Tar-chan Family Returns Home"; Transliteration: "Kaettekita Tā-chan Famirī no maki" (帰ってきたターちゃん一家（ファミリー）の巻)	January 20, 1994
16	"The Beautiful Assassin"; Transliteration: "Utsukushiki Koroshiya no maki" (美しき殺し屋の巻)	January 27, 1994
17	"Jane's Lover?"; Transliteration: "Jēn no Koibito? no maki" (ヂェーンの恋人? の巻)	February 3, 1994
18	"Along Comes a Woman"; Transliteration: "Yattekuta Hito no maki" (やって来た女（ひと）の巻)	February 10, 1994
19	"The Mysterious Corgan Family"; Transliteration: "Nazo no Kōgan Famirī no maki" (謎のコーガンファミリーの巻)	February 17, 1994
20	"The Emotional? Meeting"; Transliteration: "Kandō no? go-Taimen no maki" (感動の? ご対面の巻)	February 24, 1994
21	"The Preliminary Tournament Begins"; Transliteration: "Yosen Tōnamento Kaishi no maki" (予選トーナメント開始の巻)	March 3, 1994
22	"The Arranged Battle!?"; Transliteration: "Shikumareta Taisen!? no maki" (仕組まれた対戦!? の巻)	March 10, 1994
23	"The Battle Family's Gamble in Pride"; Transliteration: "Kakutou-ke no Hokori ni Kakete no maki" (格闘家の誇りに賭けての巻)	March 17, 1994
24	"The Secret of Apollonia Mask"; Transliteration: "Aporonia Kamen no Himitsu no maki" (アポロニア仮面の秘密の巻)	March 24, 1994
25	"Recover! Michael!!"; Transliteration: "Tachinaore! Maikeru!! no maki" (立ち直れ! マイケル!! の巻)	March 31, 1994
26	"Killer Machine Nid"; Transliteration: "Satsujin Mashin Nido no maki" (殺人機械（マシン）ニドの巻)	April 7, 1994
27	"Tar-chan Power Down!?"; Transliteration: "Tā-chan Pawā Daun!? no maki" (ターちゃんパワーダウン!? の巻)	April 14, 1994
28	"Michael's Do or Die Battle!"; Transliteration: "Maikeru Kesshi no Tatakai! no maki" (マイケル決死の戦い! の巻)	April 21, 1994
29	"Fierce Fighting! Tar-chan vs Nid Gekitō!"; Transliteration: "Tā-chan VS Nido no maki" (激闘! ターちゃん VS ニドの巻)	April 28, 1994
30	"The Final Battle! Tournament"; Transliteration: "Finals Saigo no Tatakai! Kesshōsen no maki" (最後の戦い! 決勝戦の巻)	May 12, 1994
31	"The Beautiful Challenger"; Transliteration: "Utsukushiki Chōsensha no maki" (美しき挑戦者の巻)	May 19, 1994
32	"The Terrible Vampire"; Transliteration: "Kyōfu no Banpaia no maki" (恐怖のヴァンパイアの巻)	May 26, 1994
33	"The Tragic Vampire Hunter"; Transliteration: "Higeki no Banpaia Senshi no maki" (悲劇のヴァンパイア戦士の巻)	June 2, 1994
34	"The Mysterious Organization Cerberus"; Transliteration: "Nazo no Soshiki Keruberosu no maki" (謎の組織ケルベロスの巻)	June 9, 1994
35	"Great Enemy! Rose Fighter Mani"; Transliteration: "Kyōteki! Bara no Kenshi Mani no maki" (強敵! バラの拳士マニの巻)	June 16, 1994
36	"The Tar-chan Family's Desperate Situation"; Transliteration: "Tā-chan Famirī Zettai Zetsumei! no maki" (ターちゃん一家（ファミリー）絶体絶命!の巻)	June 23, 1994
37	"The True Identity of King Dan!?"; Transliteration: "Dan Kokuō no Shōtai!? no maki" (ダン国王の正体!?の巻)	June 30, 1994
38	"The Strongest Vampire"; Transliteration: "Saikyō no Banpaia no maki" (最強のヴァンパイアの巻)	July 7, 1994
39	"Hero's Rebirth!!"; Transliteration: "Yūsha Fukkatsu!! no maki" (勇者復活!! の巻)	July 14, 1994
40	"The Ultimate Battle!!"; Transliteration: "Kyūkyoku no Batoru!! no maki" (究極のバトル!!の巻)	July 21, 1994
41	"Premonition of a Strong Enemy"; Transliteration: "Kyōteki no Yokan no maki" (強敵の予感の巻)	July 28, 1994
42	"The Demon Clone Man"; Transliteration: "Akuma no Kurōn Ningen no maki" (悪魔のクローン人間 の巻)	August 4, 1994
43	"Win Through the Tournament!!"; Transliteration: "Kachinuke! Tōnamento!! no maki" (勝ち抜け!トーナメント!!の巻)	August 11, 1994
44	"The Foul Cerberus"; Transliteration: "Hiretsu na Keruberosu no maki" (卑劣なケルベロスの巻)	August 18, 1994
45	"Ryō-shihan vs. The Clone"; Transliteration: "Ryō-shihan tai Kurōn no maki" (梁師範対クローンの巻)	August 25, 1994
46	"Tar-chan is Worried?"; Transliteration: "Taa-chan Nayamu? no maki" (ターちゃん悩む? の巻)	September 1, 1994
47	"Iron Mask's Tears"; Transliteration: "Aian Masuku no Namida no maki" (アイアンマスクの涙の巻)	September 8, 1994
48	"Clone vs. Tar-chan"; Transliteration: "Kurōn tai Taa-chan no maki" (クローン対ターちゃんの巻)	September 15, 1994
49	"Conclusion Time"; Transliteration: "Ketchaku no Toki no maki" (決着の時の巻)	September 22, 1994
50	"The Great Tar-chan Family Gathering!!"; Transliteration: "Tā-chan Famirī Dai Shūgō!! no maki" (ターちゃん一家（ファミリー）大集合!! の巻)	September 29, 1994

=== Video games ===
Jungle King Tar-chan for Game Boy, published by Bandai, was released on July 29, 1994. Jungle no Ōja Tar-chan: Sekai Manyū Dai Kakutō no Maki for Super Famicom, published by Bandai, was released on September 17, 1994.

In addition, the series has been featured in two separate Weekly Shōnen Jump crossover video games; the RPG Famicom game Famicom Jump II: The Strongest Seven, and the Nintendo DS fighting game Jump Ultimate Stars.
