= Takeshi Okano =

Japanese manga artist (born 1967)

Takeshi Okano 岡野 剛
- Born: May 9, 1967 (age 59) Kashiwa, Chiba Prefecture, Japan
- Area: Manga artist
- Pseudonym: Takeshi Nomura (のむら剛)
- Notable works: Hell Teacher: Jigoku Sensei Nube; Reibaishi Izuna
- Collaborators: Shō Makura
- Awards: 28th Akatsuka Award

Takeshi Okano (Japanese: 岡野 剛, Hepburn: Okano Takeshi; born May 9, 1967) is a Japanese manga artist. He is best known for his work illustrating Hell Teacher: Jigoku Sensei Nube, with Shō Makura writing the story. It has been adapted into two anime television series and a live-action television drama. He has illustrated several related works, including Reibaishi Izuna. Okano has also illustrated Digimon Next, while Tatsuya Hamazaki wrote the story.

== Biography ==
Okano was born in Kashiwa, Chiba Prefecture, Japan, on May 9, 1967. Okano began working as a manga artist in 1987 with the one-shot Bakuhatsu! Yuriko-sensei published in Weekly Shōnen Jump Autumn Special under the name Takeshi Nomura. The next year, his one-shot AT Lady! won the 28th Akatsuka Award for best comedic story; it was published as a series in Weekly Shōnen Jump from 1989 to 1990. He then worked as an assistant to Haruto Umezawa on his manga Sakenomi Dōji.

Okano's next series, Hell Teacher: Jigoku Sensei Nube, began serialization in Weekly Shōnen Jump on August 24, 1993, with Shō Makura writing the story. Its serialization ended on May 11, 1999. (Note: It finished in the magazine's 24th issue of 1999, released on May 11 of that same year.) It has been adapted into two anime television series, one that began in 1996 and one that began in 2025, as well as a live-action television drama in 2014. Manga artists Yuko Asami and Kohara Omi worked as assistants to Okano on Hell Teacher: Jigoku Sensei Nube. In 2000, Okano illustrated Tsurikkies Pintarō in Weekly Shōnen Jump, with Makura writing the story. The next year, he published Magician² in the same magazine. Okano published the manga Mikakunin Shōnen Gedō in the same magazine from 2004 to 2005. Okano illustrated the manga Digimon Next published in V Jump from 2006 to 2008; Tatsuya Hamazaki wrote the story.

Okano began illustrating Reibaishi Izuna, a spin-off of Hell Teacher: Jigoku Sensei Nube, in Oh Super Jump and Super Jump on July 18, 2007; Makura wrote the story. (Note: It debuted in the magazine's August 2007 issue, released on July 18 of that same year.) Its serialization ended on October 12, 2011. A sequel, titled Reibaishi Izuna: Ascension, was serialized in Grand Jump and Grand Jump Premium from November 16, 2011, to June 22, 2016. Makura and Okano have written other manga based on Hell Teacher: Jigoku Sensei Nube, including Jigoku Sensei Nūbē Neo (2014–2018), Jigoku Sensei Nūbē S (2018–2021), Jigoku Sensei Nube Kai (2025–present), and Hell Teacher: Jigoku Sensei Nube Plus (2025).

== Influences ==
Okano has cited Eko Eko Azarak, Ushiro no Hyakutaro, the works of Kazuo Umezu, and H. R. Giger's designs for Alien as sources of inspiration. Additionally, he initially resisted calling his drawings yōkai because of the popularity of Shigeru Mizuki's works. Okano stated that he has used Miki Imai, Nene Otsuka, and Playboy models as inspiration for drawing female characters.

== Views ==
In 2014, Okano made a post on his Twitter account in which he argued that child pornography laws in Japan are having a chilling effect on the manga industry.

== Works ==
=== Series ===
Title	Year	Magazine	Notes	Ref.
AT Lady!	1989–1990	Weekly Shōnen Jump	As Takeshi Nomura	
Hell Teacher: Jigoku Sensei Nube	1993–1999	Weekly Shōnen Jump	With Shō Makura	
Tsurikkies Pintarō	2000	Weekly Shōnen Jump		
Magician²	2001	Weekly Shōnen Jump	With Maki Kitami	
Mikakunin Shōnen Gedō	2004–2005	Weekly Shōnen Jump		
Digimon Next	2006–2008	V Jump	With Tatsuya Hamazaki	
Reibaishi Izuna	2007–2011	Oh Super Jump; Super Jump	With Shō Makura	
Reibaishi Izuna: Ascension	2011–2016	Grand Jump; Grand Jump Premium	With Shō Makura	
Jigoku Sensei Nūbē Neo	2014–2018	Grand Jump; Grand Jump Premium; Saikyō Jump	With Shō Makura	
Jigoku Sensei Nūbē S	2018–2021	Saikyō Jump	With Shō Makura	
Jigoku Sensei Nube Kai	2025–present	Saikyō Jump	With Shō Makura	
Hell Teacher: Jigoku Sensei Nube Plus	2025	Shōnen Jump+	With Shō Makura	

=== Other ===
- Run for Money: The Great Mission (2023) – original character designs
