= Shine On! Bakumatsu Bad Boys! =

Japanese anime television series

- Key visual

ブッチギレ！ (Bucchigire!)
- Genre: Historical
- Created by: Twin Engine
- Anime television series
- Directed by: Tetsuo Hirakawa
- Written by: Tetsuo Hirakawa
- Music by: Yasuharu Takanashi
- Studio: Geno Studio
- Licensed by: Crunchyroll: SEA: Medialink (under licensed from bilibili)
- Original network: Tokyo MX, BS11, SBS Shizuoka, AT-X, GBS, RNB, NCC Nagasaki
- Original run: July 8, 2022 – September 23, 2022
- Episodes: 12

Shine On! Bakumatsu Bad Boys! (ブッチギレ！, Bucchigire!) is an original Japanese anime television series animated by Geno Studio and produced by Twin Engine. It is directed and written by Tetsuo Hirakawa, with Yasuharu Takanashi composing the music. It aired from July to September 2022 on Tokyo MX and BS11.

== Plot ==
During Japan's Bakumatsu period, the Shinsengumi's Eighth Division is virtually annihilated by an imperialist criminal gang known as the Masked Demons. The sole survivor, Heisuke Toudou, is badly injured, losing a hand and a foot. Toudou is tasked by local feudal lord, Matsudaira Katamori, to maintain order, so he offers eight convicts who have been sentenced to death the chance to redeem themselves by abandoning their old names and becoming replacements for the eight dead Shinsengumi captains. Seven prisoners, Sakuya, Bou, Sougen, Gatarou, Suzuran, Akira and Ichibanboshi accept the offer, the eighth is immediately executed.

== Characters ==
Ichibanboshi (一番星)
Voiced by: Gen Satō
During his childhood, his parents and young brother were killed by a demon samurai with a distinctive mask. Since then, he has had a strong dislike of samurai and vowed to take revenge but was arrested for attacking one of the masked men and sentenced to death. He was one of the eight condemned criminals offered a chance by Heisuke Todou to take on the identity of a Shinsengumi captain and took the name of Isami Kondo. He has unkempt red hair and has an impulsive personality, but becomes the de-facto leader of the substitute Shinsengumi.
Sakuya (サクヤ)
Voiced by: Shun'ichi Toki
A young man who became an assassin after killing his abusive father who also mistreated his mother. He was tasked with killing the intellectual Shozan Sakuma but was betrayed and sold off as a criminal, and is now a target of his former employers, the Dark Slayers. He has a cool and calculating demeanor who lives only to kill. He became a substitute Shinsengumi with the identity of Toshizo Hijikata.
Heisuke Todo (藤堂 平助, Tōdō Heisuke)
Voiced by: Toshiyuki Toyonaga
He is the sole survivor of an attack on the Shinsengumi by a demon, losing his left eye, left arm, and left leg in the process. He works for the feudal lord, Matsudaira Katamori for whom he recruited substitute Shinsengumi from a group of condemned criminals.
Akira (アキラ)
Voiced by: Sumire Uesaka
An accomplished young female swordswoman with long white hair masquerading as a man who takes the identity of Soji Okita in the substitute Shinsengumi.
Sōgen (ソウゲン)
Voiced by: Shin-ichiro Miki
A tall slim man with skills in medicine and science who was arrested for dissecting abandoned corpses and making euthanizing medicines. He takes the identity of Keisuke Yamanami in the substitute Shinsengumi. He is not a fighter, and his preferred weapon is self-made explosives.
Suzuran (スズラン)
Voiced by: Yūto Uemura
He is a former Buddhist monk with purple hair who was arrested for conducting a Christian funeral service. He becomes Hajime Saito in the substitute Shinsengumi and his weapon is his staff. It was modified by Suzuran by embedding part of Hajime Saito's katana, Kijinmaru kinishige, into the tip and enhancing it with an electric current.
Gyatarō (ギャタロウ)
Voiced by: Wataru Takagi
An older man with long thinning orange hair who takes the identity of Shinpachi Nagakura in the substitute Shinsengumi. His preferred weapon is a rifle with Shinpachi's broken sword attached as a bayonet.
Bō (ボウ)
Voiced by: Fukushi Ochiai
He is a physically huge man with flowing yellow hair who takes the identity of Sanosuke Harada in the substitute Shinsengumi. He has superhuman strength and wields a spear.
Rashōmaru/Tsukito (羅生丸/ツキト)
Voiced by: Taku Yashiro
He is the commander of the organization Masked Demons that operates behind the scenes in Kyoto. He distributes masks and mystical swords to samurai in Kyoto. His true identity is Ichibanboshi's younger brother Tsukito who was taken and raised by the leader of the Masked Demons after he was forced to kill his mother to save his own life.
Katamori Matsudaira (松平 容保, Matsudaira Katamori)
Voiced by: Yusuke Shirai
The lord of the Aizu clan and Kyoto shugoshoku, and founder of the Kaedama Shinsengumi.
Teijirō Akizuki (秋月 悌次郎, Akizuki Teijirō)
Voiced by: Kōji Ishii
An advisor to Matsudaira Katamori.

== Production and release ==
The original anime television series was announced on March 24, 2022. Tetsuo Hirakawa is directing the anime at Geno Studio, with Hirakawa also writing the scripts, and Yasuharu Takanashi composing the music. Original character designs are provided by Hiroyuki Takei, the author of Shaman King, while Masafumi Yokota adapts the designs for animation. The series aired from July 8 to September 23, 2022, on Tokyo MX and BS11. The opening theme song is "Ichiban Hikare! -Bucchigire-" (一番光れ！-ブッチギレ-) by Takanori Nishikawa, while the ending theme song is "Danzai Democracy" (断罪デモクラシー) by Jizō Sonzai name-less. Crunchyroll has licensed the series.

No.	Title (Note: All English episode titles taken from Crunchyroll.)	Directed by	Original release date
1	"Deceive! The Shinsengumi of Criminals"; Transliteration: "Tabakare! Toganin shinsengu" (Japanese: タバカレ！咎人新選組)	Masafumi Yokota	July 8, 2022
When he was a boy, Ichibanboshi's family were killed by a mask-wearing samurai wielding a huge purple-glowing sword and now he is seeking revenge for their deaths. After finding and fighting three similarly masked samurai in the street he is captured by the police and sentenced to death. About to be executed, he discovers that he is one of eight prisoners to which Heisuke Toudou offers the chance to redeem themselves. They must abandon their old names and becoming replacements for eight dead Shinsengumi captains who were assassinated by an imperialist criminal gang known as the Zomennooni or Masked Demons. Seven of the prisoners, Sakuya, Bou, Sougen, Gatarou, Suzuran, Akira and Ichibanboshi accept the offer, but the eighth refuses and is immediately executed by the former assassin Sakuya. Ichibanboshi is given the identity of Isami Kondo.
2	"Shine On! Keepsake Katana"; Transliteration: "Hikare! Katami no nihontō" (Japanese: ヒカレ！形見の日本刀)	Toshie Kawamura	July 15, 2022
Because of the light and power that came from Ichibanboshi's katana, Toudou suspects that the spirits of the dead Shinsengumi are contained within their katanas. The new substitute Shinsengumi have to escort the intellectual Shozan Sakuma and learn more about themselves and each other on the journey. One night, Sakuya is visited by Hikosai Kawakami, one of the Dark Slayer assassins he formerly worked for and is reminded of his assignment to kill Shozan. However, after being betrayed and sold off as a criminal by his associates and then reborn as the Shinsengumi Toshizo Hijikata, Sakuya refuses. As they face off in a duel to the death, Ichibanboshi arrives, drawn there by his katana Kotetsu.
3	"Disguise Yourself! Infiltrating the Red Light District"; Transliteration: "Yosooe! Yūkaku sen'nyū" (Japanese: ヨソオエ！遊郭潜入)	Masafumi Yokota, Masaki Yamada	July 22, 2022
The assassin, Kawakami, decides that his fight with Sakuya can wait and prepares to first eliminate Ichibanboshi. They clash and Ichibanboshi is easily disarmed, however before Kawakami can kill him, Sakuya runs Kawakami through with his katana. Later, Katamori visits Toudou and expresses his concern about Kogoro Katsura from the Choshu Domain. A flashback to a Yoshidaya style Kutani workshop shows four men attacking and attempting to rape Akira, but she draws a dagger and kills them all. Back in the present, Akira dresses as a geisha and Ichibanboshi as a kitchen hand to infiltrate Katsura's headquarters at a Yoshidaya. Akira is almost caught, but the head geisha, Ikuchiyo, surprisingly covers for her. Elsewhere, Sakuya catches a Choshu spy who reveals that he was hired to spread rumors that Kogoro has been frequenting the Yoshidaya. At the Yoshidaya, Katsura prepares to slay all the occupants, hoping to eliminate any traitors drawn there by the rumors. Akira reveals herself as a spy as does Ichibanboshi who had told all the staff to flee. Fortunately, the Shinsengumi arrive and save them, assisted by Ikuchiyo who is really a man and an adept swordsman. Kogoro challenges Akira, but she suspects that he substitute send to hunt out spies and easily cuts him down with Kuki-ichimonji, the katana of Soji Okita, glowing white. Back at the Choshu Domain, it is revealed that Ikuchiyo is really Kogoro Katsura who went to the Kawakami to slay the imposter.
4	"Search! For the Mysterious Magical Swords"; Transliteration: "Sagure! Nazo no yōtō" (Japanese: サグレ！謎の妖刀)	Toshie Kawamura	July 29, 2022
While the substitute Shinsengumi captains sleep after a drunken night celebrating their victory, Choshu agents led by Mikura and Arakida who have infiltrated the Shinsengumi, prepare to kill them with purple-glowing katanas. The substitutes manage to rouse from their stupor and defeat them, capturing Mikura and extracting information that orphan children have been distributing the mysterious magical katanas to anti-shogunate ronin. Fortunately, Gatarou was a former leader of an orphan gang and Toudou uses him to gather information. Meanwhile, Akira approaches Ikuchiyo who admits to being Kogoro Katsura, but not part of the ill-advised Choshu plot to wipe out the Shinsengumi. Ikuchiyo says that the men with masks are working with Choshu extremists and she offers to collaborate to with the Akira and the Shinsengumi to stop them. The orphan Tomekichi tells Gatarou that the mystical katanas are distributed by boat along the river and leads them to the hideout of some of the masked men. When they refuse to pay the boy and threaten to kill him, Gatarou, Ichibanboshi and Bou burst in to save him. However, they are interrupted by Rashomaru a captain of the Masked Demons, who had just escaped an attempt on his life by Sakuya at the Kamogawa Delta near the Choshu Domain mansion. Rashomaru flees with the katanas, pursued by Ichibanboshi. During the ensuing fight, Rashomaru is unmasked and revealed to be Ichibanboshi's younger brother Tsukito who claims to have killed their mother with the same sword used to kill their father.
5	"Show Them! The Pride of a Monk and a Doctor"; Transliteration: "Misero! Bōzu to isha no iji" (Japanese: ミセロ！坊主と医者の意地)	Masafumi Yokota, Masaki Yamada	August 5, 2022
Sakuya interrupts the fight between Ichibanboshi and Rashomaru, attacking the latter, however Rashomaru eacapes by boat with the mystical katanas. Meanwhile, Sougen examines mysterious katana fragments and finds they are only made of copper and have no special qualities, and that the bodies of their owners show no signs of chemical enhancement. While the Shinsengumi begin a recruitment drive, Sougen and Suzuran visit Mokichi, a man Sougen treated after he was slashed in the street, however they find him dying of an unknown ailment which intrigues Sougen. While Sougen and Suzuran are discussing the afterlife, the broken katana in Suzuran's staff starts vibrating, and he sees Mokichi's spirit pointing towards the Shirakawaya mansion. This causes the Shinsengumi to suspect Shirakawaya but they cannot act without evidence and begin investigating separately. Akira secretly meets Ikuchiyo who tells her that the Shirakawaya are profiting by controlling the price of kerosene. After dark, Sougen and Suzuran approach the Shirakawaya mansion and are surrounded by masked men but manage to defeat them and return to headquarters to report the incident. Toudou prepares the Shinsengumi to confront the Shirakawaya the following night, but he orders Ichibanboshi to stay behind because of his unpredictable behavior. Meanwhile, Rashomaru approaches his master and confirms that he would kill his brother if he stands in their way.
6	"Raid! The Crooked Shirakawaya"; Transliteration: "Kachikome! Akutoku shirakawa ya" (Japanese: カチコメ！悪徳白川屋)	Toshie Kawamura	August 12, 2022
Disappointed at being left out of the Shirakawaya raid, Ichibanboshi drowns his disappointment in sake at bar where he meets stranger named Hikojiro Uchiyama and drinks with him all night. Uchiyama is revealed to be the town magistrate who has been working with the Masked Demon organization to provide for his sister Okayo, and the next morning he goes to the Shirakawaya leader to terminate their arrangement. That night, Toudou leads the Shinsengumi to the Shirakawaya who have enjoyed the protection of Uchiyama which Ichibanboshi overhears. The Shinsengumi find the Shirakawaya abandoned, but a trapdoor leads to an underground tunnel with walls covered in bonji. They eventually come across a strange contraption inside a large cavern with multiple tubes leading up through the roof. They are challenged by Rashomaru who then sets the place ablaze and exits back through the trapdoor sealing them underground. Ichibanboshi has followed the Shinsengumi and confronts his brother, but refuses to draw his sword to fight. Rashomaru calls forward Uchiyama, telling him to kill Ichibanboshi or his sister will be killed. Uchiyama attacks Ichibanboshi who kills the magistrate to defend himself, but distraught at having to kill someone whom he considered a friend. Meanwhile, the Sougen rigs a bomb to blow open the trapdoor, and Shinsengumi emerge from underground. With the Shirakawaya building burning to the ground and any evidence destroyed, Toudou has nothing to show for his effort so he decides to disband the Shinsengumi.
7	"Prevent! The Dissolution of the Shinsengumi"; Transliteration: "Fusege! Shinsengu kaisan" (Japanese: フセゲ！新選組解散)	Masaki Yamada	August 19, 2022
After the failure of the Shinsengumi raid at Shirakawaya, Akizuki advises Katamori that the Mimawarigumi should protect the capital, however Katamori gives Toudou three days to restore the Shinsengumi's honor or they will be punished. Sakuya arrives with news that Teizo Miyabe, a royalist from the Higo Domain, and an anti-shogunate extremist, has arrives in the city with 25 men. If they apprehend him, this will restore the Shinsengumi's honor. Meanwhile, Ichibanboshi escapes from his cell and approaches Okayo Uchiyama at her brother's funeral. Initially she attacks him, but she eventually agrees to help bring the Masked Demons to justice. Through their contacts, the Shinsengumi learn that ronin from Choshu, Satsuma, Higo and Tosa Domanins are appearing in the city and the ink wholesalers, Masuya, may be involved. When the Shinsengumi investigate Masuya, they find a huge weapons and ammunition cache, including rifles and explosives, and capture Shuntaro Furutaka. Sakuya tortures Furutaka who reveals that the conspirators plan the set fire to the city and are meeting at the Shimamuraya Inn. Ichibanboshi returns to the Shinsengumi with information that the conspirators are meeting at the Ikedaya Inn before setting fire to the city. Toudou returns the katana Kotetsu to Ichibanboshi as they prepare to stop the conspiracy.
8	"Blitz! The Ikedaya Incident"; Transliteration: "Blitz! The Ikedaya Incident" (Japanese: ブッコメ！池田屋事件)	Toshie Kawamura	August 26, 2022
With reports that the anti-shogun conspiritors are meeting at either the Shimamuraya or Ikedaya Inns, Toudou splits the Shinsengumi into two groups: Team Hijikata, led by Sakuya with Suzuran, Sougen and Bou to search Shimamuraya and nearby inns and Team Kondo led by Ichibanboshi with Akira and Gatarou to search Ikedaya and other nearby inns. Meanwhile, Akizuki councils Katamori that the Aizu should not become involved as it could provoke war between the Aizu and Choshu Domains. At Ikedaya the conspirators debate their strategy while Kogoro Katsura questions the need to destroy the city and whether the Masked Demons are using the clans to pursue their own agenda. Team Hijikata finds a map at Shimamuraya showing the Seimei shrine as the flash point and head there, but are too late to stop an explosion and subsequent fire. Team Kondo enter Ikedaya Inn and confront the conspirators and a bloody battle ensues. Katsura escapes after a brief encounter with Akira where he says she would make him a suitable wife. More explosions across the city start multiple fires, but when Katsura returns to his headquarters, he orders his Choshu forces not to support the conspirators at Ikedaya, but to help with firefighting. Rashomaru arrives at Ikedaya and attacks Ichibanboshi, and as he is about to deal a killing blow, he is stopped by Toukou who takes the impact. Badly wounded, Toukou makes Ichibanboshi commander of the Shinsengumi. The Aizu arrive too late to help in the battle, but are instead instructed to help extinguish the fires.
9	"Ponder! A Person's Thoughts and a Demon's Thoughts"; Transliteration: "Hasero! Hito no omoi oni no omoi" (Japanese: ハセロ！人の想い 鬼の想い)	Masaki Yamada	September 2, 2022
Under Ichibanboshi's leadership, the Shinsengumi help the citizenry begin to rebuild the burned out parts of the city, and the popularity and respect for the Shinsengumi increases after the Ikedaya incident. Katsura visits Akira and asks to marry him, but she finds the concept difficult to accept. While performing the last rites for the dead, including the conspirators, Suzuran fins that each one has a map folded inside their mask. The leader of the Masked Demons is frustrated that the Shinsengumi prevented the anticipated large number of deaths to provide enough souls for their planned ritual, so he orders Rashomaru to take the lives of his brother Ichibanboshi and the scholar Shozan Sakuma. When Rashomaru confronts Sakuma, the scholar asks him to explain the purpose of his leader. Rashomaru says that they use ancient spells to transform the souls of those who died protecting the country into swords and type-zero weaponry to defeat the foreigners whom he sees as invaders. Sakuma ridicules that type of backward-looking philosophy and tells Rashomaru to think for himself, however Rashomaru believes that he has already become a demon and slays Sakuma. As he dies Sakuma clutches a painting of Japanese boats attacking a Western ship as a signal to the Shinsengumi of the Masked Demons' intentions. Katamori orders the Shinsengumi to the Sakai port in Osaka to stop any attack on foreign ships.
10	"Defend! The Black American Ships"; Transliteration: "Mamore! Amerika kurofune" (Japanese: マモレ！亜米利加黒船)	Toshie Kawamura	September 9, 2022
The Shinsengumi arrive at Sakai and see a black United States ship moored in the bay. At Hagi Castle in the Choshu Domain, the anti-foreigner retainer, Genzui Kusaka, to Lord Takachika Mori wants to attack the foreigners but Katsura advises against it as it would be an unwinnable war without modern armaments, and Mori agrees. However, Kusaka says that this will change when Izuma Maki carries out his secret plan. Meanwhile, Rashomaru leads a raid on the American ship and takes control, he then proceeds to fire its guns into Osaka to inflame anti-foreign sentiment. As the ship sails away, Sougen suggests they use an experimental motorized boat to catch them which is successful. They board and take over the ship, but then powerful type-zero spirit weapons enhanced Choshu cannons under Izuma Maki on the shore fire on the ship, disabling it. Ichibanboshi and Rashomaru continue to fight on deck until a cannon blast throws them into the sea. Ichibanboshi saves Rashomaru from drowning, dragging him ashore, but Rashomaru is unrepentant and departs. Emboldened by Maki's success, Kusaka and his troops march on Kyoto with spirit weapons provided by the Masked Demons.
11	"Rush! To the Kyoto Showdown"; Transliteration: "Tsuppashire! Kyōtodai kessen" (Japanese: ツッパシレ！京都大決戦)	Masaki Yamada	September 16, 2022
Toudou examines the four maps retrieved from the masked demons, but cannot fathom their meaning. Rashomaru decides to quit the Masked Demons but finds he is unwillingly trapped. Akira seeks more information from Katsura who tells her that the Choshu, Kusaka and Maki, claim to have received weapons from someone in the palace indicating support from the emperor. The Shinsengumi find more maps, and then Katsura appears and reports that the Choshu will be heading from Mt. Tenno to the Iwashimizu Hachimangu Shrine. This helps Suzuran solve the riddle of the maps, realizing they form the shape of an Onmyodo pentagram ritual centered on Kyoto. The Shinsengumi head to the five temples at the points of the pentagram to stop the imperialists who possess enhanced weapons from the Masked Demon. Toudou goes to the palace and advises his mentor Harou Tsuchimikado to evacuate, but then realizes that Tsuchimikado was the masked man who killed the original Shinsengumi captains. Meanwhile, the imperialists light trails of gunpowder to form flaming lines of the pentagram across the city drawing the souls of the dead together to produce the energy to resurrect the ancient Onmyodo specialist Abe no Haruakira. The demon then uses Rashomaru's body to form the center of a glowing demon skeleton.
12	"Shine On! The Shinsengumi of Criminals"; Transliteration: "Butchigire! Toganin shinsengu" (Japanese: ブッチギレ！咎人新選組)	Toshie Kawamura	September 23, 2022
A pillar of light ascends from the palace attracting the demon skeleton, but also drawing in the substitute Shinsengumi whose swords all begin glowing because of the Shinsengumi souls contained with in them. They arrive at the palace to be challenged by the same skeletal demon which killed the original Shinsengumi captains. Ichibanboshi leads an all-out assault on the demon and with their enhances weapons, especially Suzuran's electrified staff, they cut the demon to pieces. Inside the palace, Tsuchimikado realizes that the Shinsengumi have defeated the demon and sacrifices himself in a second attempt to resurrect Abe no Haruakira. However, this time Rashomaru rebels against his exploitation and uses the demon's sword to pierce his own body and finally destroy the demon. As he dies Rashomaru again becomes Ichibanboshi's beloved brother Tsukito and they are reunited. With the demon power dissipated, the Choshu attack on the palace is thwarted and they are forced to withdraw.
