= Your Forma =

Japanese light novel series

- First light novel volume cover, featuring Echika Hieda (front) and Harold W. Lucraft (back)

ユア・フォルマ (Yua Foruma)
- Genre: Mystery; Science fiction
- Light novel
- Written by: Mareho Kikuishi
- Illustrated by: Tsubata Nozaki
- Published by: ASCII Media Works
- English publisher: NA: Yen Press
- Imprint: Dengeki Bunko
- Original run: March 10, 2021 – present
- Volumes: 7
- Manga
- Written by: Mareho Kikuishi
- Illustrated by: Yoshinori Kisaragi
- Published by: Kadokawa Shoten
- English publisher: NA: Yen Press
- Magazine: Young Ace
- Original run: June 4, 2021 – September 4, 2023
- Volumes: 3
- Anime television series
- Directed by: Takaharu Ozaki
- Written by: Kazuyuki Fudeyasu
- Music by: Tatsuya Kato
- Studio: Geno Studio
- Licensed by: Remow
- Original network: ANN (TV Asahi), BS Asahi
- Original run: April 2, 2025 – June 25, 2025
- Episodes: 13
- icon

Your Forma (Japanese: ユア・フォルマ, Hepburn: Yua Foruma) is a Japanese light novel series written by Mareho Kikuishi and illustrated by Tsubata Nozaki. It began publication under ASCII Media Works' Dengeki Bunko imprint in March 2021. As of April 2025, seven volumes have been released. A manga adaptation, illustrated by Yoshinori Kisaragi, was serialized in Kadokawa Shoten's Young Ace magazine from June 2021 to September 2023, with its individual chapters collected into three volumes. An anime television series adaptation produced by Geno Studio aired from April to June 2025.

== Characters ==
Echika Hieda (エチカ・ヒエダ)
Voiced by: Kana Hanazawa (PV, anime) (Japanese); Stephanie Sheh (English)
Harold W. Lucraft (ハロルド・W・ルークラフト, Harorudo W. Rūkurafuto)
Voiced by: Kensho Ono (PV, anime) (Japanese); Mark Whitten (English)
Bigga (ビガ, Biga)
Voiced by: Nao Tōyama (Japanese); Courtney Lin (English)
Totoki (トトキ)
Voiced by: Aya Endō (Japanese); Abby Trott (English)
Fokine (フォーキン, Fōkin)
Voiced by: Nobuhiko Okamoto
Darya (ダリヤ, Dariya)
Voiced by: Ayaka Nanase (Japanese); Shelby Young (English)
Lexie (レクシー, Rekushī)
Voiced by: Chiwa Saitō
Benno (ベンノ)
Voiced by: Yū Hayashi
Kuprian Valentinovich Napolov (ナポロフ, Naporofu)
Voiced by: Koichi Yamadera
Kazimir Matinovich Szubin (シュビン, Shubin)
Voiced by: Tomokazu Sugita
Sozon A. Chernov (ソゾン, Sozon)
Voiced by: Jun Fukuyama
Raissa Germaine Robin (ライザ, Raiza)
Voiced by: Hisako Tōjō

== Media ==
=== Light novel ===
Written by Mareho Kikuishi and illustrated by Tsubata Nozaki, the series began publication under ASCII Media Works' Dengeki Bunko imprint on March 10, 2021. As of April 2025, seven volumes have been released.

In October 2021, Yen Press announced that they licensed the series for English publication.

==== Volumes ====
No.	Original release date	Original ISBN	English release date	English ISBN
1	March 10, 2021	978-4-04-913686-9	June 7, 2022	978-1-9753-3965-4
2	June 10, 2021	978-4-04-913687-6	October 18, 2022	978-1-9753-4342-2
3	November 10, 2021	978-4-04-914001-9	January 17, 2023	978-1-9753-5222-6
4	April 8, 2022	978-4-04-914152-8	September 5, 2023	978-1-9753-6788-6
5	December 9, 2022	978-4-04-914678-3	February 20, 2024	978-1-9753-7399-3
6	August 10, 2023	978-4-04-915136-7	August 20, 2024	978-1-9753-9383-0
7	April 10, 2025	978-4-04-915504-4	September 22, 2026	979-8-8554-3452-1

=== Manga ===
A manga adaptation, illustrated by Yoshinori Kisaragi, was serialized in Young Ace from June 4, 2021, to September 4, 2023. Kadokawa Shoten published the individual chapters in three tankōbon volumes.

At Anime Expo 2022, Yen Press announced that they also licensed the manga adaptation for English publication.

==== Volumes ====
No.	Original release date	Original ISBN	English release date	English ISBN
1	November 9, 2021	978-4-04-111922-8	January 17, 2023	978-1-9753-5184-7
2	December 28, 2023	978-4-04-113163-3	January 21, 2025	979-8-8554-0632-0
3	December 28, 2023	978-4-04-113164-0	July 22, 2025	979-8-8554-0634-4

=== Anime ===
An anime television series adaptation was announced at the Dengeki Bunko 30th anniversary event on July 15, 2023. It is produced by Twin Engine, animated by Geno Studio and directed by Takaharu Ozaki, with Kazuyuki Fudeyasu handling series composition and writing episode screenplays, Chikashi Kadekaru designing the characters and Tatsuya Kato composing the music. The series aired from April 2 to June 25, 2025, on the brand new IMAnimation W programming block on TV Asahi and its affiliates. The opening theme song is "Gridout", performed by Yama, while the ending theme song is "Neo-Luddite" (ネオラダイト), performed by 9Lana. Remow licensed the series for streaming on Samsung TV Plus in North America, Animation Digital Network in EMEA territories, and Anime Onegai in Latin American territories. The series began streaming on Amazon Prime Video on July 11, 2025.

==== Episodes ====
No.	Title	Directed by (Note: Production staff information is taken from the ending credits of each episode.)	Storyboard by	Original release date
1	"Mechanical Friends Amicus Robots"; Transliteration: "Kikai Shikake no Yūjin" (Japanese: 機械仕掛けの友人)	Takaharu Ozaki	Takaharu Ozaki	April 2, 2025
2	"A Black Box"; Transliteration: "Burakku Bokkusu" (Japanese: ブラックボックス)	Daisuke Shimamura	Takaharu Ozaki	April 9, 2025 (Note: This episode aired at 11:51 p.m. JST, 6 minutes after the original air time on TV Asahi.)
3	"Pursuit"; Transliteration: "Tsuiseki" (Japanese: 追跡)	Kaoru Suzuki	Kaoru Suzuki	April 16, 2025
4	"Regret"; Transliteration: "Kōkai" (Japanese: 後悔)	Takeru Ogiwara	Takeru Ogiwara	April 23, 2025
5	"Persona"; Transliteration: "Kamen" (Japanese: 仮面)	Yukio Kuroda	Katsumi Terahigashi	April 30, 2025
6	"Father and Daughter"; Transliteration: "Chichi to Ko" (Japanese: 父と娘)	Yūma Imura	Hiromitsu Kanazawa	May 7, 2025
7	"Flower of Fire"; Transliteration: "Hi no Hana" (Japanese: 火の花)	Atsuji Tanizawa	Goichi Iwahata	May 14, 2025
8	"Fiction"; Transliteration: "Kyokou" (Japanese: 虚構)	Daisuke Shimamura	Daisuke Shimamura	May 21, 2025
9	"The Nightmare of Petersburg"; Transliteration: "Peteruburuku no Akumu" (Japanese: ペテルブルクの悪夢)	Takaharu Ozaki	Takaharu Ozaki	May 28, 2025
10	"Footsteps of the Nightmare"; Transliteration: "Akumu no Kutsuoto" (Japanese: 悪夢の靴音)	Yukio Kuroda	Hiromitsu Kanazawa	June 4, 2025
11	"Replay of the Nightmare"; Transliteration: "Akumu no Saien" (Japanese: 悪夢の再演)	Atsuji Tanizawa & Akira Toba	Goichi Iwahata	June 11, 2025
12	"Manifestation of the Nightmare"; Transliteration: "Akumu no Kengen" (Japanese: 悪夢の顕現)	Daisuke Shimamura	Daisuke Shimamura	June 18, 2025
13	"Dawn of the Nightmare"; Transliteration: "Akumu no Yoake" (Japanese: 悪夢の夜明け)	Takaharu Ozaki	Takaharu Ozaki	June 25, 2025

== Reception ==
The series won the grand prize at the 27th Dengeki Novel Prize in 2021. In the 2022 edition of the Kono Light Novel ga Sugoi! guidebook, the series ranked 18th in the new work category.

Chiriuchi Taniguchi from Real Sound praised the main characters and their relationship, as well as the plot and setting of the series. Demelza from Anime UK News praised the story and characters, comparing the story to Psycho-Pass.
