= Weekly Playboy =

Japanese adult magazine by Shueisha

- Weekly Playboy, November 16, 2009, with the cover model Nozomi Sasaki
- Categories: Men's magazine
- Frequency: Weekly
- Circulation: 195,834 (December 2015)
- First issue: November 15, 1966
- Company: Shueisha
- Country: Japan
- Language: Japanese
- Website: wpb.shueisha.co.jp

Weekly Playboy (Japanese: 週刊プレイボーイ, Hepburn: Shūkan Pureibōi), also known as Shūpure (週プレ) or WPB, is a Japanese weekly magazine published by Shueisha since 1966. Although the magazine publishes a variety of news and special interest articles, columns, celebrity interviews, and manga, it is considered an adult magazine. The target demographic is men, and each issue features several partially nude pictorials of female models.

This magazine is not a regional edition of the American Playboy magazine; the Japanese edition of that magazine was published as Monthly Playboy (MPB) by Shueisha until its cancellation in January 2009.

== Manga in WPB ==
- Circuit no Ōkami II: Modena no Tsurugi by Satoshi Ikezawa
- Lady Snowblood (修羅雪姫) by Kazuo Koike and Kazuo Kamimura
- Modena no Ken (モデナの剣) by Satoshi Ikezawa
- My Favorite Carrera (彼女のカレラ) by Kia Asamiya
- Ore no Sora (俺の空) by Hiroshi Motomiya
- Polo Shirt and Upper Cut by Norifusa Mita
- The First President of Japan by Yoshiki Hidaka and Ryuji Tsugihara
- Taiyō no Makibaō by Tsunomaru
- Ultimate Muscle by Yudetamago
- Beat Shot!! by Satoshi Ikezawa
- Sakigake!! Otokojuku by Akira Miyashita
