= Shō Makura =

Japanese manga artist

Shō Makura 真倉翔
- Born: July 21, 1964 (age 62) Aichi Prefecture, Japan
- Area: Manga artist
- Pseudonym: Maina Makura (真倉まいな)
- Notable works: Hell Teacher: Jigoku Sensei Nube
- Collaborators: Takeshi Okano

Shō Makura (真倉翔, Makura Shou; born July 21, 1964) is a Japanese manga artist known both for his own works as well as being the collaborative artist with manga writers such as Takeshi Okano. His most notable work has been Hell Teacher: Jigoku Sensei Nube which has adapted into an anime series.

== Biography ==
After graduating from a private university, he worked as a salaried employee for a year and a half.

Originally, he wrote adult manga under the name Makura Maina, mainly for magazines published by Shobunkan. In 1990 , she debuted with Tengai-kun's Magnificent Troubles in Shueisha's Weekly Shonen Jump. In 1991 , he serialized the same work. After that, he transitioned to being a writer.

In 1993 , he collaborated with Takeshi Okano on the hit series Hell Teacher: Jigoku Sensei Nube. It has been adapted into two anime television series, one that began in 1996 and one that began in 2025, and had even created an image for the opening sequence before the anime project was announced. He also designed the title logo for "Nube" with an anime-like feel in mind .

After that, he collaborated with newcomer manga artist Haruhi Kato, but without much success, so he moved his activities to seinen magazines. In 2008 , he collaborated with Kato again on Boyoyon☆Pandaruman, which was released as part of Shueisha's new children's book series, Wakuwaku Kids Book.

Makura began writing Reibaishi Izuna, a spin-off of Hell Teacher: Jigoku Sensei Nube, in Oh Super Jump and Super Jump on July 18, 2007; Okano illustrated the story. (Note: It debuted in the magazine's August 2007 issue, released on July 18 of that same year.) Its serialization ended on October 12, 2011. A sequel, titled Reibaishi Izuna: Ascension, was serialized in Grand Jump and Grand Jump Premium from November 16, 2011, to June 22, 2016. Makura and Okano have written other manga based on Hell Teacher: Jigoku Sensei Nube, including Jigoku Sensei Nūbē Neo (2014–2018) in Grand Jump Premium and Grand Jump, Jigoku Sensei Nūbē S (2018–2021), Jigoku Sensei Nube Kai (2025–present) in Saikyō Jump, and Hell Teacher: Jigoku Sensei Nube Plus (2025) in Shōnen Jump+.

== Works ==
=== Under the name Makura Maina ===
- Bouncing sensitivity 100
- Boom score 100
- OH! Parallel School
- CHEWING-KISS
- That girl is Dokin-chan
- Funya! The ultimate AV girl
- Don't turn the page of Kumiko
- Bouncing sensitivity 99

=== Under the name Shō Makura ===
- Tengai-kun's Magnificent Troubles (Weekly Shonen Jump, Shueisha , 2 volumes)
- Bluff 4x4 (Included in Volume 2 of Tengai-kun's Magnificent Troubles)
- Hell Teacher Nube (Manga: Tsuyoshi Okano , Weekly Shonen Jump, Shueisha, 31 volumes total)
- Bassmaster Motoki (Manga: Takeshi Okano)
- Tsurikkies Pintaro (Manga: Takeshi Okano, Weekly Shonen Jump, Shueisha, 3 volumes total)
- Langerhans Island, a Natural Paradise (Manga: Kato Haruka)
- Meltomo! E-nosuke (Manga: Kato Haruhi)
- MIRAI-san of Yoshiwara (Manga: Masatoshi Masato, Business Jump, Shueisha, 2 volumes + 1 special volume)
- Izuna the Medium (Manga: Takeshi Okano, serialized in Oh Super Jump → Super Jump → Grand Jump → Grand Jump Premium, Shueisha, Part 1 (original): 10 volumes + Part 2 (Ascension): 10 volumes) *A spin-off of "Hell Teacher Nube".
- Boyoyon☆Pandaruman (Illustration: Kato Haruka)
- Phantom Thief Chihuahua Wonder (Illustrations by Kato Haruka)
- Hell Teacher Nube NEO (Manga: Takeshi Okano, published in Grand Jump PREMIUM → Grand Jump, Shueisha, 17 volumes total)
- Hell Teacher Nube S (Manga: Takeshi Okano, Saikyō Jump, Shueisha, 4 volumes total)
- The Otherworldly Billionaire Hero! ~Since the Enemies I Defeated Turned into Gold Nuggets, I'll Unleash My Power with Money~ (Manga: Azarashi-ken, "Ima, Grand Jump tte!!" on Nico Nico Manga, December 29, 2022 - )
- Hell Teacher Nube: A Record of One Hundred Tales (Manga: Takeshi Okano, Saikyō Jump, September 2024 issue, Shueisha) *One-shot, a prequel to Hell Teacher Nube: A Tale of the Unexpected.
- Hell Teacher Nube Kai (Manga: Takeshi Okano, Saikyō Jump, June 2025 issue - , Shueisha)
- Hell Teacher Nube PLUS (Manga: Takeshi Okano, Shōnen Jump+, May 14, 2025 - , Shueisha) *Short-term intensive serialization

=== Script ===
- GeGeGe no Kitarō season 5 Episodes 38 and 45

=== Storyboard ===
- The Nightmare of Pool Cleaning (Weekly Shonen Jump Vol.36 (2004), pp.350-353, Shueisha)
- The 12th "Story King" the drawing section assignment

== Media appearances ==
- Please! Ranking presents Yasuko and Mimura's Buzz-man TV (July 5, 2025)
