= Midori no Makibaō =

Japanese manga series by Tsunomaru

- First tankōbon volume cover, featuring Midori Makibaō

みどりのマキバオー
- Genre: Comedy, sports
- Manga
- Written by: Tsunomaru
- Published by: Shueisha
- Imprint: Jump Comics
- Magazine: Weekly Shōnen Jump
- Original run: November 28, 1994 – February 9, 1998
- Volumes: 16
- Anime television series
- Directed by: Noriyuki Abe
- Produced by: Ken Hagino; Koji Kaneda; Madoka Takiyama
- Written by: Hiroshi Hashimoto
- Music by: Taro Iwashiro
- Studio: Studio Pierrot
- Original network: Fuji TV
- Original run: March 2, 1996 – July 12, 1997
- Episodes: 61
- Manga

Taiyō no Makibaō
- Written by: Tsunomaru
- Published by: Shueisha
- Magazine: Weekly Playboy (2007–2011); Shū Play News (2011–2016)
- Original run: March 26, 2007 – November 14, 2016
- Volumes: 36
- Series titles
- 1. Taiyō no Makibaō (2007–2011, 16 volumes); 2. Taiyō no Makibaō W (2011–2016, 20 volumes)
- icon

Midori no Makibaō (みどりのマキバオー; lit. 'Green Meadow King') is a Japanese manga series written and illustrated by Tsunomaru. It was serialized in Shueisha's shōnen manga magazine Weekly Shōnen Jump from November 1994 to February 1998, with its chapters collected in 16 tankōbon volumes.

A 61-episode anime television series produced by Pierrot was broadcast on Fuji TV from March 1996 to July 1997. A second manga series, titled Taiyō no Makibaō, was serialized in Weekly Playboy from 2007 to 2011, and later in the Shū Play News website, under the title Taiyō no Makibaō W, from 2011 to 2016, with the overall series' chapters collected in 36 volumes.

The Midori no Makibaō manga has had over 9 million copies in circulation. In 1997, it won the 42nd Shogakukan Manga Award in the children category.

== Plot ==
Midori Makibaō is a small, white mule. His physique, comparable to that of a donkey and characterized by wide nostrils, distinguishes him from larger thoroughbreds. Compensating for his stature with exceptional determination and speed, Makibaō achieves victory in major races.

His career begins with significant challenges, yet he is driven by two powerful motives: to defeat his lifelong rival, the thoroughbred Superhorse Cascade, and to win back his mother, Midori, who was sold to settle a debt. Despite numerous hardships, Makibaō prevails through a series of demanding races to establish himself as a celebrated racehorse.

== Characters ==
=== Horses ===
Midori Makibaō (ミドリマキバオー) / Tarezo Unko (うんこ たれ蔵, Unko Tarezō)
Voiced by: Inuko Inuyama
Cascade (カスケード, Kasukēdo)
Voiced by: Tesshō Genda
Amago Vaccine (アマゴワクチン, Amago Wakuchin)
Voiced by: Yasunori Matsumoto
Nitronix (ニトロニクス, Nitoronikusu)
Voiced by: Kōji Ishii
Ancalgia (アンカルジア, Ankarujia)
Voiced by: Yoshiko Kamei
Bareknuckle (ベアナックル, Beanakkuru)
Voiced by: Takashi Nagasako
Toe Cutter (トゥーカッター, Twūkattā)
Voiced by: Nobuaki Fukuda
Morriarrow (モーリアロー, Mōriarō)
Voiced by: Masato Yamada
Satomi Amazon (サトミアマゾン, Satomi Amazon)
Voiced by: Eiji Itō
Makibako (マキバコ)
Voiced by: Ikue Ōtani
Blitz (ブリッツ, Burittsu)
Voiced by: Shinichirō Kamio (2022 special episode)
Midoriko (ミドリコ)
Voiced by: Mizuka Arima
Peter II (ピーターII, Pītā II)
Voiced by: Jūrōta Kosugi
Tsavider (ツァビデル, Tsabideru)
Voiced by: Akio Ōtsuka
Jerusalem (エルサレム, Erusaremu)
Voiced by: Tōru Ōkawa
Fried Chicken (フライドチキン, Furaido Chikin)
Voiced by: Tōru Ōkawa
Hiropon (ヒロポン)

=== Other ===
Tomonori Saegusa (三枝 友則, Saegusa Tomonori)
Voiced by: Akira Ishida
Genjiro Obu (飯富 源次郎, Obu Genjirō)
Voiced by: Kenichi Ogata
Chūbei (チュウ兵衛)
Voiced by: Shigeru Chiba
Masaru Obu (飯富勝, Obu Masaru)
Voiced by: Minami Takayama
Nobuhiko Horie (堀江 信彦, Horie Nobuhiko)
Voiced by: Takeshi Watabe

== Media ==
=== Manga ===
Written and illustrated by Tsunomaru, Midori no Makibaō was serialized in Shueisha's shōnen manga magazine Weekly Shōnen Jump from November 28, 1994, to February 9, 1998. Shueisha collected its chapters 16 tankōbon volumes, released from June 2, 1995, to June 4, 1998.

A second series, titled Taiyō no Makibaō (たいようのマキバオー), started in Shueisha's Weekly Playboy on March 26, 2007. (Note: It started in the magazine's 15th issue of 2007, released on March 26 of that same year.) The manga was later moved to the Shū Play News website, continued under the title Taiyō no Makibaō W (たいようのマキバオーW), where it ran from May 9, 2011, to November 14, 2016. Shueisha collected the Taiyō no Makibaō chapters in 16 tankōbon volumes, released from August 17, 2007, to June 17, 2011, while the Taiyō no Makibaō W chapters were collected in 20 tankōbon volumes, released from September 16, 2011, to February 17, 2017.

=== Anime ===
A 61-episode anime television series adaptation, produced by Pierrot and directed by Noriyuki Abe, was broadcast on Fuji TV from March 2, 1996, to July 12, 1997. The opening theme is "Hashire Makibaō" (走れマキバオー; 'Run, Makibaō') by F.MAP; the song is a cover of Salty Sugar's 1970 song "Hashire Kotarō" (走れコウタロー; 'Run, Kotarō'). The ending theme is "Tottemo Umanami" (とってもウマナミ; 'Super Delicious') by Men's 5.

The series was re-released on a Blu-ray box on July 27, 2022, which included a five-minute-long new episode that adapted the final chapter of the original manga series.

==== Episodes ====
No.	Title	Original release date
1	"Born to be Droopy!"; Transliteration: "Umarete Odoro ita!" (Japanese: 生まれてオドロいた!)	March 2, 1996
2	"Tarezo Unko!"; Transliteration: "Unko Tarezō!" (Japanese: うんこたれ蔵!)	March 9, 1996
3	"The Demon Trainer!"; Transliteration: "Oni no Chōkyōshi!" (Japanese: 鬼の調教師!)	March 16, 1996
4	"Cascade is Here!"; Transliteration: "Kasukēdo Tōjō!" (Japanese: カスケード登場!)	March 23, 1996
5	"It's Getting Worse!"; Transliteration: "Dame ni Naru!" (Japanese: だめになる!)	March 30, 1996
6	"It's the Ones Who Stand Up!"; Transliteration: "Tatsunda Tare Kura!" (Japanese: 立つんだ たれ蔵!)	April 6, 1996
7	"Who's Going to Get In?"; Transliteration: "Dare ga Noru no?!" (Japanese: 誰がのるの?!)	April 20, 1996
8	"The King of Green Farm"; Transliteration: "Midori Bokujō no Ōsama" (Japanese: みどり牧場の王様)	April 27, 1996
9	"We're Going to be Strong!"; Transliteration: "Tsuyoku Naru zo!!!" (Japanese: 強くなるぞっ!!)	May 4, 1996
10	"Stormy Debut!"; Transliteration: "Arashi no Debyū!!" (Japanese: 嵐のデビュー!!)	May 11, 1996
11	"Poke It! Tarezo!"; Transliteration: "Tsukkome! Tarezō!" (Japanese: つっこめ!たれ蔵!!)	May 18, 1996
12	"Who's Stronger?"; Transliteration: "Docchi ga Tsuyoi no!?" (Japanese: どっちが強いの!?)	May 25, 1996
13	"The Black Assassin!"; Transliteration: "Kuroi Koroshi-ya!" (Japanese: 黒い殺し屋!)	June 15, 1996
14	"Don't Be So Lax!"; Transliteration: "Amattareru na?!!" (Japanese: 甘ったれるな～!!)	June 22, 1996
15	"No More Hesitations!"; Transliteration: "Mō Mayowanai" (Japanese: もう迷わない!)	July 6, 1996
16	"You've Got the Score!"; Transliteration: "Hakatta na!!" (Japanese: はかったな!!)	July 13, 1996
17	"Scatter! Mud!"; Transliteration: "Kechirase! Doronko!!" (Japanese: けちらせ! 泥んこ!!)	August 10, 1996
18	"Go! Operation Ballerina"; Transliteration: "Ike!! Bareriina Sakusen" (Japanese: 行け!! バレリーナ作戦)	August 17, 1996
19	"Cascade Debut!"; Transliteration: "Kasukēdo Debyū!!" (Japanese: カスケードデビュー!!)	August 24, 1996
20	"The Devil's Triangle"; Transliteration: "Ma no Toraianguru" (Japanese: 魔のトライアングル)	August 31, 1996
21	"200% Guts!"; Transliteration: "Konjō 200%!!" (Japanese: 根性 200%!!)	September 7, 1996
22	"Haha, Kitoku"; Transliteration: "Haha Kitoku" (Japanese: ハハ キトク)	September 14, 1996
23	"The Rain of Trials! The Morning of the Asahi Cup!"; Transliteration: "Shiren no Ame! Asahi-hai no Asa!!" (Japanese: 試練の雨! 朝日杯の朝!!)	September 21, 1996
24	"Survival at 1600M"; Transliteration: "1600M no Sabaibaru!!" (Japanese: 1600Mのサバイバル!!)	September 28, 1996
25	"The Three Strong Races! Who Will Win?"; Transliteration: "Sankyō Gekisō!! Katsu no wa?!" (Japanese: 三強激走!! 勝つのは?!)	October 5, 1996
26	"It's a Game? Kansuke's Tearful Whip!"; Transliteration: "Shōbuari?! Kansuke Namida no Muchi!!" (Japanese: 勝負あり?! 菅助 涙のムチ!!)	October 12, 1996
27	"To Mongolia, the White Steppe!"; Transliteration: "Shiroi Sōgen, Mongoru e!" (Japanese: 剛VS柔!空前絶後の兄弟喧嘩!)	October 19, 1996
28	"Ride to the Wilderness!"; Transliteration: "Gen'ya no Ikkiuchi!!" (Japanese: 原野の一騎討ち!!)	October 26, 1996
29	"Awaken! The Power of the Wild!"; Transliteration: "Mezamero!! Yasei no Chikara!!" (Japanese: 目覚めろ!! 野性の力!!)	November 2, 1996
30	"Tarezo Runs for His Life!"; Transliteration: "Tarezō Inochigake no Shissō!!" (Japanese: たれ蔵・命がけの疾走!!)	November 9, 1996
31	"Rush! A Death Battle of Rage!"; Transliteration: "Mō Tosshin!! Ikari no Shitō!!" (Japanese: 猛突進!! 怒りの死闘!!)	November 16, 1996
32	"The Devil's Lucky Horse"; Transliteration: "Akuma no Rakkii Hōsu" (Japanese: 悪魔のラッキーホース)	November 23, 1996
33	"There's a Foul! Arrow's Persistence!"; Transliteration: "Hansoku Ari! Arō no Shūnen!!" (Japanese: 反則あり! アローの執念!!)	November 30, 1996
34	"Showdown! Dangerous Race!"; Transliteration: "Taiketsu! Kiken'na Rēsu!!" (Japanese: 対決! 危険なレース!!)	December 7, 1996
35	"Clash!! The Wounded Spirit!!"; Transliteration: "Gekitotsu! Kizudarake no Konjō!!" (Japanese: 激突!! 傷だらけの根性!!)	December 14, 1996
36	"Two Traps! The Start of the Satsuki Shō!"; Transliteration: "Futatsu no Wana! Satsuki-shō Sutāto!!" (Japanese: 2つの罠! 皐月賞スタート!!)	December 21, 1996
37	"Make It Happen! White Miracle!"; Transliteration: "Okose!! Shiroi Kiseki!!" (Japanese: 起こせ!! 白い奇跡!!)	January 11, 1997
38	"Fear! The Invisible Enemy!"; Transliteration: "Senritsu!! Mienaiteki!!" (Japanese: 戦慄!! 見えない敵!!)	January 18, 1997
39	"The Fierce Battle! Japan Derby!"; Transliteration: "Gekitō!! Nihon Dābī!!" (Japanese: 激闘!! 日本ダービー!!)	January 25, 1997
40	"Deliver! To the Goal of Japan's Best!"; Transliteration: "Todoke!! Nihon'ichi no Gōru e!!" (Japanese: 届け!! 日本一のゴールへ!!)	February 1, 1997
41	"Banei Racing to Visit Mother"; Transliteration: "Haha O Tazunete Ban'eikeiba" (Japanese: 母を訪ねてばんえい競馬)	February 8, 1997
42	"The Ambition of the Nemesis, Beard and His Parents"; Transliteration: "Shukuteki Hige Oyako no Yabō" (Japanese: 宿敵・ヒゲ親子の野望)	February 15, 1997
43	"The Challenge from Makibako!"; Transliteration: "Makibako kara no Chōsen!" (Japanese: マキバコからの挑戦!)	February 22, 1997
44	"Farewell, Mother!"; Transliteration: "Saraba O Ka-chan!!" (Japanese: さらばおかーちゃん!!)	March 1, 1997
45	"Secret Training Deep in the Mountains!"; Transliteration: "Yamaoku no Himitsu Tokkun!!" (Japanese: 山奥の秘密特訓!!)	March 8, 1997
46	"A Change? Tarezo's Big Change!"; Transliteration: "Ihen?! Tarezō Dai Henshin?!" (Japanese: 異変?! たれ蔵大変身?!)	March 15, 1997
47	"Running! The Kikuka-shō of Determination!"; Transliteration: "Hassō!! Ketsui no Kikka-shō!!" (Japanese: 発走!! 決意の菊花賞!!)	March 22, 1997
48	"The First Move is a Must! Kansuke's Big Game!"; Transliteration: "Sente Hisshō!! Kansuke no Dai Shōbu!" (Japanese: 先手必勝!! 菅助の大勝負!!)	March 29, 1997
49	"Collapse! The Legend of the Black King!"; Transliteration: "Hōkai!! Kuroi Teiō Densetsu!!" (Japanese: 崩壊!! 黒い帝王伝説!!)	April 5, 1997
50	"New Coach Tsavidel!"; Transliteration: "Shin Kōchi Tsabideru!!" (Japanese: 新コーチ・ツァビデル!!)	April 12, 1997
51	"Clash! The Decisive Battle of Arima Kinen!"; Transliteration: "Gekitotsu!! Kessen no Arima Kinen!!" (Japanese: 激突!! 決戦の有馬記念!!)	April 19, 1997
52	"The Last Spurt of the Dangerous Race!"; Transliteration: "Inochigake no Rasutosupāto!!" (Japanese: 命がけのラストスパート!!)	April 26, 1997
53	"Pour All Your Strength! The Final Closing!"; Transliteration: "Sosoge Zenryoku!! Saigo no Kecchaku!!" (Japanese: 注げ全力!! 最後の決着!!)	May 10, 1997
54	"Hungry! The Tarezo Trial"; Transliteration: "Harapeko! Tarezō Saiban" (Japanese: はらぺこ！たれ蔵裁判)	May 17, 1997
55	"American Makibao!"; Transliteration: "Amerika no Makibaō!" (Japanese: アメリカのマキバオー!!)	May 24, 1997
56	"Trapped Makibako!"; Transliteration: "Toraware no Makibako!!" (Japanese: とらわれのマキバコ!!)	May 31, 1997
57	"Discovery? The Phantom Strongest Horse!"; Transliteration: "Hakken?! Maboroshi no Saikyō-ba!!" (Japanese: 発見?! 幻の最強馬!!)	June 7, 1997
58	"Operation Magnet of Fear!"; Transliteration: "Kyōfu no Magunetto Sakusen!!" (Japanese: 恐怖のマグネット作戦!!)	June 14, 1997
59	"Rampage! Escape from the Amazon!"; Transliteration: "Dai Abare!! Amazon Dasshutsu!!" (Japanese: 大暴れ!! アマゾン脱出!!)	June 21, 1997
60	"The Greatest Race Ever!"; Transliteration: "Shijō Saidai no Rēsu!!" (Japanese: 史上最大のレース!!)	July 5, 1997
61	"Run! Makibao of the World!"; Transliteration: "Hashire!! Sekai no Makibaō!!" (Japanese: 走れ!! 世界のマキバオー!!)	July 12, 1997

=== Dokodemo Makibao ===
A spin-off original net animation (ONA) series, titled Dokodemo Makibao (どこでもマキバオー; 'Makibao Everywhere'), premiered on December 16, 2024, on the YouTube, X/Twitter, TikTok, and Instagram platforms. It was directed by Frogman, who also oversaw the scripts, and produced the series at DLE with cooperation by KDDI. The music was composed by Kyohei Matsuno, and starred Inuko Inuyama, Shigeru Chiba, Toshiharu Sakurai, and Frogman.

A second season, titled Dokodemo Makibao: World Tour (どこでもマキバオー ～ワールドツアー～), premiered on October 8, 2025. It is directed by Frogman and Tsukasa Nishiyama, with Naotoshi Nakajima and Yuh Ochiai overseeing the scripts, and Matsuno returned to compose the music.

=== Other ===
An art exhibition to celebrate the series' 30th anniversary ran at the Graveyard Gallery in Nakano, Tokyo from November 7 to December 2, 2024.

A collaborative illustration with Umamusume: Pretty Derby's Cinderella Gray manga, featuring Midori Makibaō and Tamamo Cross, was included in Weekly Young Jump's 39th issue of 2021, released on August 26 of that same year. On April Fools' Day 2026, a collaborative video with Umamusume was released to celebrate the 30th anniversary of the Midori no Makibaō anime series, the fifth anniversary of the Umamusume video game, and the year of the Horse in 2026. The video recreates the opening sequence of Midori no Makibaō, featuring Makibaō and the Umamusume characters whose names end with "o" (such as Tokai Teio, T. M. Opera O, Sakura Bakushin O, Sakura Chiyono O, Sakura Chitose O, and Calstone Light O).

== Reception ==
The manga has had over 9 million copies in circulation. In 1997, the manga won the 42nd Shogakukan Manga Award in the children category.

== See also ==
- List of fictional horses
