= Tsunomaru =

Japanese manga artist

Tsunomaru (つの丸; born 27 May 1970 in Chiba, Japan) is a Japanese manga artist who writes mostly shōnen manga. He debuted in 1991 with "Go Go Pocho Mukin" (GOGOポチョムキン), which received the Shōnen Weekly Jump newcomer's award. Tsunomaru is best known for the horse-racing comedy Midori no Makibaō, which was adapted as a 61-episode anime television series and received the 1997 Shogakukan Manga Award for children's manga.

== Style ==
Tsunomaru is known for his distinct drawing style. Most of his characters have monkey-like features, most notable in his manga Mon Mon Mon!, including short stature, small eyes, large nostrils, big lips, and if male, exposed genitals.

== Works ==
- Mon mon mon (モンモンモン), Weekly Shōnen Jump (1992–1993, 8 volumes)
- Midori no Makibaō (みどりのマキバオー), Weekly Shōnen Jump (1994–1998, 16 volumes)
- Survibee (サバイビー sabaibi-), Weekly Shōnen Jump (1999, 3 volumes)
- Jūshin Igari Tora Jirō (重臣猪狩虎次郎), Weekly Shōnen Jump (2001, 2 volumes)
- Gocchan desu!! (ごっちゃんです!!), Weekly Shōnen Jump (2003–2004, 5 volumes)
- Taiyō no Makibaō (たいようのマキバオー), Weekly Playboy (2007–2011, 16 volumes)
- Taiyō no Makibaō W (たいようのマキバオーW), Weekly Playboy (2011–2016, 20 volumes)
