= Geno Studio =

Japanese animation studio

Geno Studio, Inc.
- Native name: 株式会社ジェノスタジオ
- Romanized name: Kabushiki-gaisha Jeno Sutajio
- Type: Kabushiki gaisha
- Industry: Japanese animation
- Predecessor: Manglobe
- Founded: November 19, 2015; 10 years ago
- Headquarters: Ogikubo, Suginami, Tokyo, Japan
- Key people: Kōji Yamamoto (CEO)
- Number of employees: 17
- Parent: Twin Engine
- Website: genostudio.co.jp

Geno Studio, Inc. (Japanese: 株式会社ジェノスタジオ, Hepburn: Kabushiki-gaisha Jeno Sutajio) is a Japanese animation studio subsidiary of animation production company Twin Engine.

== Establishment ==
In 2015, previous Fuji TV's Noitamina producer Kōji Yamamoto established the studio after he founded his own production company, Twin Engine, in 2014. Geno Studio is a complete subsidiary of Twin Engine, and most of its staff came from the now defunct studio Manglobe.

== Works ==
=== Television series ===
Title	Director(s)	First run start date	First run end date	Eps	Note(s)	Ref(s)
Kokkoku: Moment by Moment	Yoshimitsu Ohashi	January 7, 2018	March 25, 2018	12	Adaptation of the manga written by Seita Horio.	
Golden Kamuy	Hitoshi Nanba	April 9, 2018	December 21, 2020	36	Adaptation of the manga written by Satoru Noda.	
Pet	Takahiro Omori	January 6, 2020	March 30, 2020	13	Adaptation of the manga written by Ranjō Miyake.	
Shine On! Bakumatsu Bad Boys!	Tetsuo Hirakawa	July 8, 2022	September 23, 2022	12	Original work.	
Your Forma	Takaharu Ozaki	April 2, 2025	June 25, 2025	13	Adaptation of the light novel series written by Mareho Kikuishi.	

=== OVAs ===
- Golden Kamuy (2018–2020, 4 episodes)

=== Films ===
- Genocidal Organ (2017, taken over from Manglobe)

=== ONAs ===
- Star Wars: Visions - Lop & Ochō (2021)
