= Akatsuka Award =

Japanese manga award

The Akatsuka Award (赤塚賞, Akatsuka Shō) is the name of a semi-annual award for gag manga by the Japanese publisher Shueisha.

The award has been given since 1974 and it aims to reward new manga artists in the comedy manga category. Its counterpart award, Tezuka Award, awards new manga artists in the Story Manga category. The award was named after Fujio Akatsuka, one of the most successful comedy mangaka. Notable entrants and winners include Kyosuke Usuta, Kousuke Masuda, Shuichi Aso, Takeshi Okano, Kazumata Oguri, Mitsutoshi Shimabukuro, Norihiro Yagi and Yusuke Murata.

In 2019, the 91st Akatsuka Award was held. This marked the first time that a winner was selected for the award in 29 years.

== See also ==
- List of manga awards
