= Super Jump =

Japanese biweekly manga magazine

- Cover of the June 11, 2008 issue of Super Jump magazine featuring Bin ~Sonshī Iden~ on the cover
- Categories: Seinen manga
- Frequency: Biweekly
- Circulation: 342,500 (2008)
- First issue: December 20, 1986
- Final issue: 2011
- Company: Shueisha
- Country: Japan
- Based in: Tokyo
- Language: Japanese
- Website: (Official website) (archived)

Super Jump (Japanese: スーパージャンプ, Hepburn: Sūpā Janpu; abbreviated SJ, and stylized SUPER JUMP), was a biweekly seinen manga anthology magazine published by Shueisha under the Jump line of magazines. Released in Japan on December 20, 1986, the magazine provided serialized chapters of various seinen manga series. The manga series were published under the Jump Comics Deluxe imprint.

== History ==
The magazine started as a special issue of Weekly Shōnen Jump (WJ) on December 20, 1986. It later got split into its own independent bimonthly manga anthology. It was primarily drama manga and was intended for young adult males in their early years of college. Super Jump manga artists were normally shōnen artists from Weekly Jump, or were supported by another shōnen magazine. Some Weekly Jump series moved with Super Jump's split, due to their higher age level (e.g. Cobra).

Very rarely Weekly Jump handed a series over to Weekly Young Jump. If it was, the manga had a much more mature audience. Shueisha (publisher of Super Jump and other Jump anthologies) was worried that if too many series were moved, the younger fans would have been exposed to older, mature series (also an issue with other major Japanese publishing companies). Titles like Business Jump, Ultra Jump, and others were restricted from having Weekly Jump series moved into their anthologies.

On December 11, 1988, Super Jump made a special anthology; Oh Super Jump (オースーパージャンプ, Ō Sūpa Janpu; literally - "O Super Jump"). The "Oh" in Oh Super Jump stands for "Otaku" (the name for an obsessive anime and manga fan). Some series from the offshoot have also been moved to the main magazine in 2007.

Super Jump published its last issue in late 2011. Three ongoing series were moved to a new title, Grand Jump.

== Features ==
=== Oh Super Jump ===
Oh Super Jump (オースーパージャンプ, Ō Supā Janpu) was an offshoot of the leading magazine, Super Jump. Oh Super Jump started as a special issue of the main manga magazine Super Jump in January 2004. After 2004 the magazine became a monthly publication, with many serializations. Although the magazine became a monthly it still had many one-shots in addition to the main series. The "Oh" in Oh Super Jump stood for Otaku, a name for an established anime and manga fan.

=== Serializations ===
Title	Began	Ended	Author/Illustrator
Akatsuki! Otokojuku: Seinen yo, Daishi wo Idake (曉!!男塾 青年よ、大死を抱け)	2001		Akira Miyashita
Ukkari Mariko-san (うっかり♥マリ子さん)	2009	Current	Kyō Hatsuki
Edomae Sushi Shokunin Kirara no Shigoto: Wārudo Batoru (江戸前鮨職人きららの仕事 ワールドバトル)	2008	Current	Hikari Hayakawa, Kokura Hashimoto
Ōsama no Shitate ya ~Saruto Infinity~ (王様の仕立て屋〜サルト・フィニート〜)	2008	Current	Ton Ōgawara
Kimi no Naifu (君のナイフ)	2009	Current	Yua Kotegawa
Gokko (ごっこ)	2010	Current	Hiroyuki Shouji
Jin (JIN-仁-)	2000	2010	Motoka Murakami
Zero: The Man of the Creation (ゼロ The Man of the Creation)	1991	2011	Ai Eishi, Katsura Satomi
Soshite, Boku wa Kimi ni Kaeru (そして、僕は君に還る)	2010	Current	Kenichi Kotani
Takeda Fukubuchō (竹田副部長)			Yasutaka Togashi
Tenkanin Soul (天下人ソウル)	2010	Current	Makoto Samejima
Tokubō Asakura Sōhei (トクボウ 朝倉草平)			Hidebu Takahashi
Bi-shōjo Inpara! (美少女いんぱら!)	2008	Current	Yūji Kitamura
Bin ~Sonshī Iden~ (臏 〜孫子異伝〜)	2008	Current	Hiroshi Hoshino
Fuguman (ふぐマン)	2008	Current	Masaya Tokuhiro
Bengo! (BENGO!)			Shō Kitagawa
Honya-san ni Kikimashita (本屋さんにききました。)			Takeshi Wakasha
Reibaishi Izuna (霊媒師いずな)			Shō Makura, Takeshi Okano

==== Former series ====
Title	Began	Ended	Author/Illustrator
Akane iro no Kaze (あかね色の風)	1993	1994	Masami Kurumada
Ai Shura za Rejiendo (愛修羅 ザ レジェンド)			Shinji Hiramatsu
Bartender (バーテンダー)	2004	2011	Araki Shiro, Takeshi Nagatomo
Eater (EATER)			Masatoshi Usune
Edo Mae Sushi Shokunin Kirara no Shigoto (江戸前鮨職人きららの仕事)			Hikari Hayakawa, Kokura Hashimoto
Ōedo Bāritōdo (大江戸バーリトゥード)			Onisoto Fukunai, Kazutoshi Yamane
Ōsaka Red ano Goro, Oretachi Ha… (大阪RED あの頃、俺達は…)			Sachiji Takahashi
Kurozuka (KUROZUKA-黒塚-)	2003	2006	Baku Yumemakura, Satoshi Noguchi
Oh! Tōmeiningen 21 (Oh! 透明人間21)			Yasuhiro Nakanishi
Osamushi Kyōju no Jikenbo (オサムシ教授の事件簿)			Yoshinobu Yamaguchi
Oshitone Ten Zen (おしとね天繕)			Tsukasa Yamaguchi
Onsen Heyukō! (温泉へゆこう!)			Yasuhiro Nakanishi
Gun Dragon II (GUN DRAGON II)			Buichi Terasawa
Gun Dragon Σ (GUN DRAGON Σ)			Buichi Terasawa
Kigyō Senshi Yamazaki (企業戦士YAMAZAKI)	1992	1999	Jun Tomizawa
Kimera (キメラ)			Tei Ogata
Kyōshirō 2030 (狂四郎2030)			Masaya Tokuhiro
Kyōtei Shōjo (競艇少女)			Yū Terashima, Hiroshi Koizumi
Gyojin-Sou kara Ai wo Komete (魚人荘から愛をこめて)			Makoto Isshiki
Gurētohōsu (グレートホース)			Yoshihiro Takahashi
Kurofuku Monogatari (黒服物語)			Ryō Kuraka, Manabu Narita
Kurofune (KUROFUNE 黒船)			Ryōka Shū, Satoru Mori
Kōtsūjiko Kanteinin kan Rin'ichirō (交通事故鑑定人 環倫一郎)			Kengo Kaji, Hijiri Kisaki
Space Adventure Cobra (スペースアドベンチャーコブラ)	1995	2002	Buichi Terasawa
Golden Boy (ゴールデンボーイ)	1992	1997	Tatsuya Egawa
Kikoku Nin Den rei Kiba (鬼哭忍伝霊牙)			Kanrai Kō-samurai
The Fund Manager (ザ・ファンドマネージャー)			Ryōka Shū, Yasuteru Iwata
Shikeishikkō Naka Datsugoku Shinkōchū (死刑執行中脱獄進行中)			Hirohiko Araki
Jitsuroku Oni Yome Nikki (実録鬼嫁日記)			Kazuma, Itokatsu
Shōwa Furōfushi Densetsu Vampire (昭和不老不死伝説 バンパイア)			Masaya Tokuhiro
Shōtosongu (ショートソング)			Kōichi Masuno
Shokutaku no Kishi (食卓の騎士)			Ōmaru Takeshi, Shinji Imaizumi
Jinjika chō Oniduka (人事課長鬼塚)			Bakunin Watanabe
Sweets! (スウィーツ!)			Kazuo Akasaka
Seikimatsu Hiroshi Ōkami den Saga (世紀末博狼伝サガ)			Akira Miyashita
Seikimatsu Rīdā Tsutata Keshi! Kanketsuhen (世紀末リーダー伝たけし!完結編)			Mitsutoshi Shimabukuro
Aka Ryūō (赤龍王)			Kokorozashi Motomiya
Sesami ☆ Sutorī-to (せさみ☆すとりーと)			Izumi Matsumoto
Sorariumu (ソラリウム)			Keīchi Itō
Desire (DESIRE)			Ken'ichi Kotani
17ans (17ANS)			Ken'ichi Kotani
Tenshoku Kizoku Mon-jirō (天職貴族 モン次郎)			Tsunomaru
Toire no Hana-chan (トイレの花ちゃん)			Shin Yoshikawa
Ku Hunting (狗ハンティング)			Baku Yumemakura, Hideaki Koyasu, Satoshi Noguchi
Donmai! (どんまい!)			Masao Yajima, Takeshi Wakasa
Natsu-chan (ナッちゃん)			Tanakajun
Newsman (ニュースマン)			Masao Yajima, Funwari
Hatarake! Memory-chan (働け!メモリちゃん)			Takeshi Wakasa
Higa Hashiru (緋が走る)			Gatsu Jōyubi, Aokitetsuo
Big Chichi-S Desu! (BIG乳Sです!)			Ayumu Nanase
Fighting Cock (FIGHTING COCK)			Tsuyoshi Adachi
Hook (HOOK-フック-)	2006	2007	Yōzōrō Kanari, Yutaka Takahashi
Aokyō Blue Hood (青侠 ブルーフッド)			Keishi Edogawa, Yōji Ishiwatari
Fundoshi Keiji ken Chanto Chako-chan (ふんどし刑事ケンちゃんとチャコちゃん)			Masaya Tokuhiro
Heaven's Drive (ヘブンズ・ドライブ)			Masayuki Yamamoto
Honō no Ryōrinin shū Tomi Toku (炎の料理人 周富徳)			Hitoshi Kō, Shinji Imaizumi, Kisho
Murder License Kiba (マーダーライセンス牙)			Shinji Hiramatsu
Murder License Kiba & Burakkuen Jieruzu (マーダーライセンス牙&ブラックエンジェルズ)	2000	2002	Shinji Hiramatsu
Mabo-chan Day by Day (マボちゃんDAY BY DAY)			Hisashi Tanaka
Marengo: Naporeon ga Itoshi ta Uma (MARENGO ナポレオンが愛した馬)	2004	2004	Takaji Yamasaki
Mikisutori (ミキストリ)			Koji Maki
MushiMushi KoroKoro (むしむしころころ)			Buronson, Tsuyoshi Adachi
Ring (リング)			Kōnen Shimabukuro
Ruri no Hō Fune (瑠璃の方船)			Baku Yumemakura, Yūko Umino
Watari Shokunin zan Kyōden Yoshita no Aji (渡職人残侠伝 慶太の味)			Hikari Hayakawa, Kokura Hashimoto
Trickster (Trickster)	2003	2003	
Étrangler (ÉTRANGLER)	2001	2002	
Black Night Bat (BLACK NIGHT BAT)	2002	2002	Buichi Terasawa
Chikyūgi (地球儀)	2002	2002	
Haikara Jiken-chō (HAIKARA事件帖)	2001	2002	Aieishi, Katsura Satomi
Ring ni Kakero 2 (リングにかけろ2)	2000	2009	Masami Kurumada
Desire ~Special Fortune~ (DESIRE ~special fortune~)			Ken'ichi Kotani
Gin no Ankā (銀のアンカー)			Bō Mitaki
Keishichō Tsutsumotase (警視庁美人局)			Tsukasa Yamaguchi
Que Sera Sera (ケ・セラ・セラ)	2007		Hiroyuki Tamakoshi
Shinigami Kansatsu-kan Kamina Raidō (死神監察官雷堂)	2006		Bakunin Watanabe
Doku × Koi (毒×恋)			Aki Katsu
Tokubō Asakura Kusa Taira (トクボウ 朝倉草平)	2008		Takeshi Takahashi
Hannarito (華なりと)	2007		Ryō Kuraka, Kaoru Tsukishima
Purinshiparu Yukichi no Gakkō (プリンシパル 諭吉の学校)	2008		Kichirō Nabeta, Yasuteru Iwata
Fure Fure Shōjo (フレフレ少女)	2008		Hiroshi Hashimoto, Kensaku Watanabe, Kumichi Yoshiduki
