= List of Cobra video games =

There are several video games based on Buichi Terasawa's manga series Cobra. The games have been released on home and handheld consoles, as well as on personal computers, mobile phones and pachinko. The first games to be released from the Cobra series were Space Cobra Professional and The Psychogun, which were published in 1982, and the latest release is Space Adventure Cobra - The Awakening, which was released in 2025. Amidst the several games released—most of them are Japan-exclusive products—Cobra and Cobra II were developed by French company Loriciels while The Space Adventure is the only Japanese game published in North America and Europe.

== Video games ==
Game	Details
Space Cobra Professional Original release date(s): JP: 1982	Release years by system: 1982 — LCD game
Space Cobra Professional Original release date(s): JP: 1982	Notes: Published and developed by Popy; Japanese title: Supēsu Kobura Purofesshonaru (スペースコブラ プロフェッショナル)
Space Cobra the Psychogun Original release date(s): JP: 1982	Release years by system: 1982 — LCD game
Space Cobra the Psychogun Original release date(s): JP: 1982	Notes: Published and developed by Popy; Japanese title: Supēsu Kobura Za Saikogan (スペースコブラ ザ・サイコガン)
Cobra Original release date(s): EU: 1987	Release years by system: 1987 — Amstrad CPC
Cobra Original release date(s): EU: 1987	Notes: Published and developed by Loriciels
Cobra II Original release date(s): EU: 1987	Release years by system: 1987 — Atari ST
Cobra II Original release date(s): EU: 1987	Notes: Published and developed by Loriciels
Cobra: Kokuryū Ō no Densetsu Original release date(s): JP: March 31, 1989	Release years by system: 1989 — TurboGrafx-16
Cobra: Kokuryū Ō no Densetsu Original release date(s): JP: March 31, 1989	Notes: Published by Hudson; Japanese title: コブラ 黒竜王の伝説
The Space Adventure - Cobra: The Legendary Bandit Original release date(s): JP: June 7, 1991; NA: 1995	Release years by system: 1991 — TurboGrafx-16; 1995 — Sega CD
The Space Adventure - Cobra: The Legendary Bandit Original release date(s): JP: June 7, 1991; NA: 1995	Notes: Published by Hudson; Japanese title: Cobra II: Densetsu no Otoko (コブラII 伝説の男, Kobura II Densetsu no Otoko); In 2008 Hudson ported it to mobile phones.
Cobra the Shooting Original release date(s): JP: November 22, 1996	Release years by system: 1996 — PlayStation
Cobra the Shooting Original release date(s): JP: November 22, 1996	Notes: Published by Takara; Japanese title: Kobura Za Shūtingu (コブラ・ザ・シューティング)
Cobra II Original release date(s): JP: 1996	Release years by system: 1996 — Pachislot
Cobra II Original release date(s): JP: 1996	Notes: Published by Olympia; Japanese title: コブラ II
Cobra the Psychogun Original release date(s): JP: January 22, 1998	Release years by system: 1998 — PlayStation
Cobra the Psychogun Original release date(s): JP: January 22, 1998	Notes: Published by Sony; Published in two parts dubbed "Vol. 1" and "Vol. 2"; Japanese title: Kobura Za Saikogan (コブラ ザ・サイコガン)
Cobra: Galaxy Knights Original release date(s): JP: February 28, 1999	Release years by system: 1999 — PlayStation
Cobra: Galaxy Knights Original release date(s): JP: February 28, 1999	Notes: Published by Sony; Japanese title: Kobura Gyarakushī Naitsu (コブラ ギャラクシー・ナイツ)
Space Adventure Cobra Conda: Typing the Psychogun Original release date(s): JP: November 22, 2001	Release years by system: 2001 — Windows / Macintosh
Space Adventure Cobra Conda: Typing the Psychogun Original release date(s): JP: November 22, 2001	Notes: Published by SSI Tristar, developed by Sting; Japanese title: Supēsu Adobenchā Kobura Konda ~Taipingu Za Saikogan~ (スペースアドベンチャー コブラ 魂打～タイピング・ザ・サイコガン～)
CR Cobra Original release date(s): JP: 2003	Release years by system: 2003 — Pachinko
CR Cobra Original release date(s): JP: 2003	Notes: Published by NewGin
Cobra the Arcade Original release date(s): JP: November 2005	Release years by system: 2005 — Arcade
Cobra the Arcade Original release date(s): JP: November 2005	Notes: Published by Namco Bandai; Japanese title: Kobura Za Ākēdo (コブラ・ザ・アーケード)
Jump Ultimate Stars Original release date(s): JP: November 23, 2006	Release years by system: 2006—Nintendo DS
Jump Ultimate Stars Original release date(s): JP: November 23, 2006	Notes: Published by Nintendo, developed by Nintendo and Ganbarion; Features Cobra, Crystal Boy, Lady Armaroid as support characters
Space Adventure Cobra Original release date(s): JP: 2008	Release years by system: 2008 — FOMA
Space Adventure Cobra Original release date(s): JP: 2008	Notes: Published by WorkJam; Ten games: Space Adventure Cobra: The Psychogun, (Note: SPACE ADVENTURE COBRA ザ・サイコガン, Supēsu Adobenchā Kobura Za Saikogan), Space Adventure Cobra: Galaxy Knights, (Note: SPACE ADVENTURE COBRA ギャラクシー・ナイツ, Supēsu Adobenchā Kobura Gyarakushī Naitsu), Space Adventure Cobra: Ōgon no Tobira, (Note: SPACE ADVENTURE COBRA 黄金の扉, Supēsu Adobenchā Kobura Ōgon no Tobira), Space Adventure Cobra: Blue Rose, (Note: SPACE ADVENTURE COBRA ブルーローズ, Supēsu Adobenchā Kobura Burū Rōzu) and Space Adventure Cobra: Time Drive. (Note: SPACE ADVENTURE COBRA タイム・ドライブ, Supēsu Adobenchā Kobura Taimu Doraibu); each released in two parts: Part 1 ("前編", Zenpen) and Part 2 ("後編", Kōhen)
CR Cobra: Owari Naki Gekitō Original release date(s): JP: 2008	Release years by system: 2008 — Pachinko
CR Cobra: Owari Naki Gekitō Original release date(s): JP: 2008	Notes: Published by NewGin; Japanese title: CRコブラ～終わりなき劇闘～
Cobra the Duel Original release date(s): JP: January 17, 2012	Release years by system: 2012 — Mobage
Cobra the Duel Original release date(s): JP: January 17, 2012	Notes: Published by DartsLive Games; Japanese title: COBRA the DUEL─コブラ─
CR Cobra: Aratanaru Tabidachi Original release date(s): JP: 2012	Release years by system: 2012 — Pachinko
CR Cobra: Aratanaru Tabidachi Original release date(s): JP: 2012	Notes: Published by NewGin; Japanese title: CR COBRA 新たなる出発
CR Cobra the Drum Original release date(s): JP: 2014	Release years by system: 2014 — Pachinko
CR Cobra the Drum Original release date(s): JP: 2014	Notes: Published by NewGin; Japanese title: CR コブラTHEドラム
Pachislot Cobra Original release date(s): JP: March 2015	Release years by system: 2014 — Pachislot
Pachislot Cobra Original release date(s): JP: March 2015	Notes: Published by SNK Playmore; Japanese title: パチスロコブラ
CR Cobra 4: Tsuioku no Symphonia Original release date(s): JP: April 3, 2017	Release years by system: 2017 — Pachinko
CR Cobra 4: Tsuioku no Symphonia Original release date(s): JP: April 3, 2017	Notes: Published by NewGin; Japanese title: CRコブラ4 追憶のシンフォニア
Space Adventure Cobra - The Awakening Original release date(s): WW: August 26, 2025	Release years by system: 2025 — PlayStation 5, Xbox Series X/S, Nintendo Switch, PC
Space Adventure Cobra - The Awakening Original release date(s): WW: August 26, 2025	Notes: Published by Microids

== Notes ==
Japanese
