= Yoshiko Sakakibara =

Japanese voice actress (born 1956)

- 榊原 良子
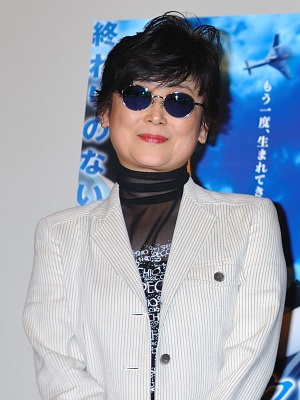
- Born: May 31, 1956 (age 70); Chiba Prefecture, Japan
- Occupations: Actress; voice actress; narrator
- Years active: 1970–present
- Notable work: Nausicaä of the Valley of the Wind as Lady Kushana; Mobile Suit Zeta Gundam Mobile Suit Gundam ZZ as Haman Karn; Bubblegum Crisis as Sylia Stingray; Patlabor as Shinobu Nagumo; Trapp Family Story as Sister Laura; Hellsing series as Integra Hellsing; You're Under Arrest as Kaoruko Kinoshita Magical Stage Fancy Lala as Mamiko Shinohara Jujutsu Kaisen as Narrator/Tengen

Yoshiko Sakakibara (榊原 良子, Sakakibara Yoshiko; born May 31, 1956 in Chiba) is a Japanese actress, voice actress and narrator.

== Career ==
In 1981, Yoshiko made her voice acting debut as Flore in Six God Combination Godmars.

In addition to her voice acting roles, she has worked as a narrator for various news programs, including a long term position on TV Asahi News Station, where she narrated for over 10 years.

She has been interested in theatrical performance since elementary school, and after gaining experience in the theater club in the middle and high school era, she majored in the theater department. While working with various theater companies, voice actors set up a new agency, and she joined upon invitation from a person who was the husband and teacher of Mari Shimizu, a participant in the launch. The president of the agency and senior colleagues also encouraged her to be a voice actor.

== Filmography ==
=== Anime ===
1980s

- 1981 Six God Combination Godmars – Flore
- 1981 Urusei Yatsura – Otama
- 1982 Space Cobra – Armaroid Lady
- 1983 Cat's Eye – Mitsuko Asatani
- 1983 Mirai Keisatsu Urashiman – Josephine Catsburg
- 1984 God Mazinger – Aira
- 1984 Yoroshiku Mechadock – Asami
- 1984 Elves of the Forest – ???
- 1985 Dancouga – Super Beast Machine God – Reimi
- 1985 Mobile Suit Zeta Gundam – Haman Karn, Mouar Pharaoh
- 1986 Maison Ikkoku – Ayako
- 1986 Mobile Suit Gundam ZZ – Haman Karn
- 1987 Kimagure Orange Road – Madoka's mother
- 1987 Mami the Psychic – Mama
- 1988 City Hunter 2 – Tachiki Sayuri
- 1988 Go! Anpanman – Tekka no Makichan
- 1989 Idol Densetsu Eriko – Ryoko Asagiri
- 1989 Blue Blink – ???
- 1989 The Adventures of Hutch the Honeybee – Mama
- 1989 Patlabor: The TV Series – Shinobu Nagumo

1990s

- 1990 Idol Angel Yokoso Yoko – Keiko Matsushima
- 1994 Blue Seed – Azusa Matsudaira
- 1995 Sailor Moon SuperS – Queen Nehelenia
- 1995 Fushigi Yûgi: The Mysterious Play – Shouka
- 1996 Kodocha – Michelle
- 1996 Sailor Moon Sailor Stars – Queen Nehelenia
- 1996 You're Under Arrest – Kaoruko Kinoshita
- 1996 The Vision of Escaflowne – Varie
- 1997 Clamp School Detectives – Casablanca
- 1997 Don't Leave Me Alone, Daisy – Mother
- 1998 Princess Nine – Keiko Himuro
- 1998 Fancy Lala – Mamiko Shinohara

2000s

- 2001 Hellsing – Sir Integra
- 2001 PaRappa the Rapper – Hairdresser Octopus Ep.27
- 2002 Tenchi Muyo! GXP – Misaki Masaki Jurai
- 2003 Chrono Crusade – Kate Valentine
- 2004 Sgt. Frog – Oka Nishizawa
- 2004 Ghost in the Shell: Stand Alone Complex 2nd GIG – Yoko Kayabuki
- 2005 Moeyo Ken – Oryou
- 2005 Tide-Line Blue – Aoi
- 2009 Inuyasha: The Final Act – Sesshōmaru's Mother
- 2009 Kiddy Girl-and – Arnice

2010s

- 2010 Cobra The Animation – Armaroid Lady
- 2010 Highschool of the Dead – Yuriko Takagi
- 2011 Nichijou – Oil in episode 15
- 2012 From the New World – Tomiko Asahina
- 2012 Saint Seiya Omega – Medea
- 2012 Psycho-Pass – Joshu Kasei
- 2014 Riddle Story of Devil – Yuri Meichi
- 2014 Bonjour♪Sweet Love Patisserie – Nadeshiko Minagawa
- 2015 Kantai Collection – Narrator, Hikōjō Ki, Chūkan Seiki
- 2015 Yona of the Dawn – Gigan
- 2015 Go! Princess PreCure – Dyspear
- 2015 Gangsta – Gina Paulklee
- 2016 The Great Passage – Kaoru Sasaki
- 2017 Grimoire of Zero – Sorena

2020s

- 2020 Akudama Drive – Boss
- 2021 Yashahime: Princess Half-Demon – Sesshōmaru's Mother
- 2021 Yasuke – Yami no Daimyо̄
- 2021 Blade Runner: Black Lotus – Josephine Grant
- 2023 The Fire Hunter – Narrator
- 2023 Jujutsu Kaisen – Narrator
- 2025 Once Upon a Witch's Death – Faust
- 2025 Apocalypse Hotel – Mujina
- 2025 Lazarus – Millie
- 2026 Jujutsu Kaisen – Tengen / Narrator
- 2026 Kaya-chan Isn't Scary – Mutsu Ebisumori
- 2026 Daemons of the Shadow Realm – Break

=== OVA ===
- 1983 Dallos – Melinda Hearst
- 1985 Greed – Mimau
- 1985 Area 88 – Yasuda
- 1985 Cream Lemon – Rio
- 1985 Vampire Hunter D – Younger Snake Sister
- 1985 The Karuizawa Syndrome – Kaoru Matsunuma
- 1986 The Humanoid – Antoinette
- 1986 Megazone 23 Part II – Reina
- 1987 Black Magic M-66 – Sybil
- 1987 Bubblegum Crisis – Sylia Stingray
- 1987 Devilman: The Birth – Sirene
- 1987 Kaze to Ki no Uta Sanctus: Sei Naru Kana – Rosemarine
- 1987 God Bless Dancouga – Remi Shikishima
- 1987 Lily C.A.T. – Carolyn
- 1988 Mobile Police Patlabor – Shinobu Nagumo
- 1988 Mobile Suit SD Gundam – Haman Karn
- 1988 Aim for the Ace! 2 – Reika Ryuuzaki
- 1988 Legend of the Galactic Heroes – Frederica Greenhill
- 1988 Crying Freeman – Bugnug
- 1989 Aim for the Ace! Final Stage – Reika Ryuuzaki
- 1989 Crusher Joe – Major Tanya
- 1989 Cleopatra DC – Mysterious Woman
- 1989 Mobile Suit Gundam 0080: War in the Pocket – Teacher, Woman Leaving to Francheska
- 1990 Cyber City Oedo 808 – Sarah
- 1990 Guardian of Darkness – Sayoo(m)ko Matsura
- 1990 SD Gundam Gaiden – Sorceress Qubeley
- 1990 Patlabor The Mobile Police: The New Files – Shinobu Nagumo
- 1990 Record of Lodoss War – Karla, Leylia
- 1990 CB Chara Nagai Go World – Sirene
- 1991 RG Veda – Karura-Ō
- 1991 Bubblegum Crash – Sylia Stingray
- 1991 Condition Green – Paula
- 1991 Super Deformed Double Feature – Sylia Stingray
- 1991 Moonlight's Earring – Takao Reseinji
- 1991 Ninja Gaiden – Sara
- 1991 Mobile Suit Gundam 0083: Stardust Memory – Haman Karn
- 1993 Super Dimension Century Orguss 02 – Miran
- 1994 Tenchi Muyo! Ryo-Ohki – Misaki
- 1995 Golden Boy – Kogure's Girlfriend
- 1996 The Special Duty Combat Unit Shinesman – Kyoko Sakakibara
- 1996 Power DoLLS – Deborah Hughes
- 1996 Mobile Suit Gundam: The 08th MS Team – Topp
- 1996 Blue Seed Beyond – Azusa Matsudaira
- 1999 Sol Bianca: The Legacy – Feb Fall
- 2001 Zone of the Enders: 2167 Idolo – Rachel Links
- 2003 Moeyo Ken – Oryo
- 2006 Hellsing Ultimate – Sir Integra Fairbrook Wingates Hellsing
- 2008 Cobra the Animation: The Psychogun – Armaroid Lady
- 2009 Cobra the Space Pirate: Time Drive – Armaroid Lady
- 2011 Supernatural: The Animation – Mysterious Beautiful Lady

=== Film ===
- 1982 Space Adventure Cobra – Armaroid Lady
- 1983 Urusei Yatsura: Only You – Elle
- 1984 Nausicaä of the Valley of the Wind – Lady Kushana
- 1987 Bats & Terry – Aya
- 1988 Maison Ikkoku: The Final Chapter – Kuroki
- 1988 Mami the Psychic: Dancing Doll of the Starry Sky – Mama
- 1988 Mobile Suit Gundam: Char's Counterattack – Nanai Miguel
- 1989 Patlabor: The Movie – Shinobu Nagumo
- 1990 Go! Anpanman: Baikinman no Gyakushuu – Tekka no Makichan
- 1993 Patlabor 2: The Movie – Shinobu Nagumo
- 1999 You're Under Arrest: The Movie – Kaoruko Kinoshita
- 1999 Digimon Adventure – Yuuko Yagami
- 2000 Blue Remains – Myazamik
- 2000 The Mini Pato – Shinobu Nagumo
- 2004 Ghost in the Shell 2: Innocence – Harraway
- 2004 Mobile Suit Zeta Gundam: A New Translation – Haman Khan
- 2005 Detective Conan: Strategy Above the Depths – Minako Akiyoshi
- 2006 Ghost in the Shell: Stand Alone Complex - Solid State Society – Yoko Kayabuki
- 2008 Ghost in the Shell 2.0 – Puppet Master
- 2008 The Sky Crawlers – Towa Sasakura
- 2009 Psalms of Planets Eureka Seven: Pocket Full of Rainbows – Old Anemone
- 2015 Harmony – Oscar Shtaufenberg
- 2015 Psycho-Pass: The Movie – Joshu Kasei
- 2025 Mononoke the Movie: The Ashes of Rage – Suikōin
- 2026 Paris ni Saku Étoile – Kunie Sonoi

=== Video games ===
- 1998 Sakura Wars 2: Thou Shalt Not Die – Carino Soletta
- 2000 Super Robot Wars Alpha – Mouar Pharaoh, Haman Karn, Nanai Miguel
- 2001 Super Robot Wars Alpha Gaiden – Mouar Pharaoh
- 2002 Space Channel 5: Part 2 – Pine
- 2002 Tales of Destiny 2 – Elrane
- 2005 10,000 Bullets – Boris
- 2006 Castle of Shikigami III – Freedom Wind
- 2006 Final Fantasy XII – Jote
- 2007 Dynasty Warriors: Gundam – Haman Karn
- 2007 ASH: Archaic Sealed Heat – Aceshin XV
- 2008 Dynasty Warriors: Gundam 2 – Haman Karn, Nanai Miguel
- 2008 Suikoden Tierkreis – Diadora
- 2008 White Knight Chronicles – Dragon Matriarch
- 2010 Dynasty Warriors: Gundam 3 – Haman Karn, Nanai Miguel
- 2012 Zero Escape: Virtue's Last Reward – Old Woman
- 2012 Phantasy Star Online 2 – Ro Kamitsu
- 2015 Shin Megami Tensei: Devil Survivor 2 Record Breaker – Polaris
- 2016 Overwatch – Ana Amari
- 2017 Fire Emblem Heroes – Mila
- 2017 Fire Emblem Echoes: Shadows of Valentia – Mila
- 2019 Super Robot Wars T – Haman Karn
- 2022 Babylon's Fall – Nergal
- 2023 Bayonetta Origins: Cereza and the Lost Demon – Morgana

=== Dubbing ===
==== Live-action ====
- Patricia Clarkson
  - Learning to Drive – Wendy Shields
  - The Maze Runner – Ava Paige
  - Maze Runner: The Scorch Trials – Ava Paige
  - Maze Runner: The Death Cure – Ava Paige
- Connie Nielsen
  - Justice League – Hippolyta
  - Wonder Woman – Hippolyta
  - Wonder Woman 1984 – Hippolyta
  - Zack Snyder's Justice League – Hippolyta
- Annette Bening
  - Love Affair – Terry McKay
  - Captain Marvel – Supreme Intelligence and Dr. Wendy Lawson / Mar-Vell
  - Death on the Nile – Euphemia
- The 100 – Dr. Abigail "Abby" Griffin (Paige Turco)
- Airplane! (1983 TBS edition) – Randy (Lorna Patterson)
- Airport '77 (1987 TV Asahi edition) – Lisa Stevens (Pamela Bellwood)
- Alien (1992 VHS/DVD edition) – Joan Lambert (Veronica Cartwright)
- Barbie – Narrator (Helen Mirren)
- The Basketball Diaries – Mrs. Carroll (Lorraine Bracco)
- Clarice – Ruth Martin (Jayne Atkinson)
- Coogan's Bluff (1984 Nippon TV edition) – Linny Raven (Tisha Sterling)
- Crocodile Dundee (1990 Fuji TV edition) – Sue Charlton (Linda Kozlowski)
- Crocodile Dundee II (1991 Fuji TV edition) – Sue Charlton (Linda Kozlowski)
- The Elephant Man (1982 TBS edition) – Ann Treves (Hannah Gordon)
- ER – Elizabeth Corday (Alex Kingston)
- The Final Countdown (1989 TBS edition) – Laurel Scott (Katharine Ross)
- Friday the 13th Part 2 – Ginny Field (Amy Steel)
- Heart of Stone – Nomad (Sophie Okonedo)
- Heaven's Gate (1988 TBS edition) – Ella Watson (Isabelle Huppert)
- Humanoids from the Deep (1984 TBS edition) – Carol Hill (Cindy Weintraub)
- The Man with the Golden Gun (1982 TBS edition) – Saida (Carmen du Sautoy)
- No Man's Land (1991 TV Asahi edition) – Ann Varrick (Lara Harris)
- Octopussy (1988 TBS edition) – Magda (Kristina Wayborn)
- Over the Top (1989 Fuji TV edition) – Christina Hawk (Susan Blakely)
- Phenomena (2020 Blu-ray edition) – Frau Brückner (Daria Nicolodi)
- Piranha (1982 TBS edition) – Laura Dickinson (Melody Thomas Scott)
- Police Story (1987 Fuji TV edition) – Selina Fong (Brigitte Lin)
- Project A Part II (1989 Fuji TV edition) – Miss Pak (Rosamund Kwan)
- Romeo and Juliet (1982 TV Asahi edition) – Juliet (Olivia Hussey)
- Shout at the Devil (1985 TBS edition) – Rosa O'Flynn (Barbara Parkins)
- The Spy Who Loved Me (1983 TBS edition) – Log Cabin Girl (Sue Vanner)
- To Kill with Intrigue (1986 TBS edition) – Chin Chin (Jeong Hee)
- Year of the Dragon (1988 TBS edition) – Tracy Tzu (Ariane Koizumi)
- Zombi 2 (1982 TBS edition) – Susan Barrett (Auretta Gay)

==== Animation ====
- The Brave Little Toaster – Rob's Mother
- Captain Planet and the Planeteers – Dr. Blight
- Legend of the Guardians: The Owls of Ga'Hoole – Nyra

== Awards ==
Year	Award	Category	Result	Ref.
2021	15th Seiyu Awards	Kazue Takahashi Memorial Award	Won	
