= Cobra II (disambiguation) =

Cobra II is a 2006 book by Michael R. Gordon

Cobra II or Cobra 2 may also refer to:

- Otokar Cobra II, an armoured tactical vehicle
- G.I. Joe: Cobra II, a comic book series
- The Space Adventure (video game), a 1991 video game known in Japan as Cobra II: Densetsu no Otoko
- Cobra II, an appearance package for the 1976 Ford Mustang car
- Cobra II, a 1996 pachislot game, see List of Cobra video games

== See also ==
- Black Cobra 2 (film), a 1989 action film
- Twin Cobra II, a 1995 video game
