= Space Adventure Cobra: The Movie =

- Theatrical release poster

Japanese name
- Kanji: スペースアドベンチャーコブラ
Transcriptions
- Revised Hepburn: Supēsu Adobenchā Kobura
- Directed by: Osamu Dezaki
- Screenplay by: Buichi Terasawa; Haruya Yamazaki
- Based on: Cobra by Buichi Terasawa
- Produced by: Tatsuo Ikeuchi
- Starring: Shigeru Matsuzaki; Akiko Nakamura; Toshiko Fujita; Reiko Tajima; Akira Kume; Gorō Mutsumi
- Cinematography: Hirokata Takahashi
- Edited by: Masatoshi Tsurubuchi
- Music by: Osamu Shoji
- Production company: Tokyo Movie Shinsha
- Distributed by: Toho
- Release date: July 3, 1982
- Running time: 99 minutes
- Country: Japan
- Language: Japanese

Space Adventure Cobra: The Movie, known in Japan as Space Adventure Cobra (Japanese: スペースアドベンチャーコブラ, Hepburn: Supēsu Adobenchā Kobura), is a 1982 Japanese animated epic space opera film directed by Osamu Dezaki based on Buichi Terasawa's 1978 manga Cobra.

== Plot ==
Space Adventure Cobra: The Movie opens with bounty hunter Jane Flower apparently killing a creature and taking its head away. As she boasts in a bar, the self-proclaimed "Cobra" is attracted to and tails her. She doubts his identity since Cobra is said to have died two years ago and to have had a special weapon called "Psychogun" in his left arm. When Cobra visits Jane in her home, the creature's head attacks them, but it is ultimately killed by Jane. She suspects a criminal group called the "Pirate Guild" to be responsible for the attack, as she is on their hit list and earlier left the head to the care of a bounty hunter organization. When the Guild's death squad chases them, Cobra reveals his signature weapon to stop their enemies. This fact is reported to Crystal Bowie, Cobra's archenemy, and Jane reveals she had been looking for Cobra's help.

Cobra and Jane meet Cobra's partner Lady Armaroid and they board his starship to go to Sido, a planet where Jane's sister Catherine is imprisoned. When they arrive on the planet, Jane says Catherine was falsely accused and is in prison because of the Guild, so she needs Cobra's help to sneak in and release her. Cobra enters alone, defeats some enemies, finds Catherine, but is ultimately captured and cryogenized by Bowie. Meanwhile, Jane is deceived and killed by Catherine who fell in love with Bowie. Cobra, however, overcomes the 400 degrees below zero temperature because of Jane's love, as Catherine interprets it; he escapes from the prison and gets Jane's corpse. When Bowie is close to open fire on them, Lady arrives and rescues Cobra.

At the request of Professor Toporo, a kind of intellectual mentor from Jane's home planet Myrus, Cobra releases Jane's body into space. Toporo further instructs him to find Jane's other sister Dominique and the "Snow Guerrillas". He meets Dominique and she explains that Myrus is a man-made star the Pirate Guild wants to reign over so as to destroy the Seventh Galaxy: Bowie later explains this is a way to demonstrate the Guild's power for as it rules over many galaxies, losing one matters not. Bowie finds them, kills Sandra, the Snow Guerrillas' leader, and Dominique, who dies in Cobra's hands after having asked him to kill Catherine to prevent the Guild from getting control of Myrus. Cobra is able to escape and goes to Myrus where he confronts Bowie and kills him, releasing Catherine from his control so she can be Myrus' queen. Catherine then joins her sisters Jane and Dominique in death as she self-sacrifices in order to divert the trajectory of Myrus into the nearest sun, while Cobra leaves her world, alone again.

== Cast ==
Character name	Japanese	English (Manga UK)	English (Streamline/Tara Releasing)
Cobra	Shigeru Matsuzaki	John Guerrasio (allonym for William Dufris)	Dan Woren
Jane Flower	Akiko Nakamura	Lorelei King	Barbara Goodson
Crystal Bowie	Gorō Mutsumi	David McAlister (as Lord Necron)	Jeff Winkless (as Crystal Boy)
Lady Armaroid	Yoshiko Sakakibara	Tamsin Hollo (as Andromeda)	J.C. Henning (Joan-Carol O'Connell) (as Lady)
Catherine Flower	Toshiko Fujita	Lorelei King	Mari Devon
Dominique Flower	Jun Fubuki	Lorelei King	Wendee Lee
Sandra	Reiko Tajima	Shelley Thompson (as Nadia)	Catherine Battistone
Professor Toporo	Akira Kume	Allan Wenger (as Professor Topolov)	Kirk Thornton (as Professor Topolov)
Missionary Dakoba	Kenichi Ogata	Allan Wenger	Jeff Winkless
Sheriff	Norio Wakamoto	John Chancer	Steve Bulen

== Production and release ==
Space Adventure Cobra is based on the first arc of Buichi Terasawa's 1978 manga Cobra, specifically Cobra's involvement with the Royal Sisters and his battle with Crystal Boy. It was theatrically released on July 23, 1982, in Japan as the first anime film to use the Quadraphonic Dolby Surround sound format. In Japan, the film was first released in December 1991 in VHS format. It was released on DVD on June 25, 2001, by Digital Site, and re-released by Happinet on August 29, 2008. Manga Entertainment released the film in British theaters in 1995. The Manga Entertainment version's dub had an alternate soundtrack performed by the pop group Yello.

An American dub for the film was created by Carl Macek's Streamline Pictures and uses the original Japanese soundtrack, and was released in American theaters by Tara on August 20, 1995, according to animation historian Jerry Beck (co-founder of Streamline), although fellow historian and former Streamline employee Fred Patten claims that the film received its theatrical premiere on October 19 at the Brattle Theatre in Cambridge, Massachusetts. With Orion Home Video denying Streamline's plan to release it on home video, the film was later distributed by Urban Vision instead on the VHS format on June 16, 1998.

The film was released in the Australasian region by Madman Entertainment on December 5, 2007. Manga Entertainment released it on DVD in April 2008. Hulu started to host the English dubbed version of the film after an agreement with TMS in January 2012. Discotek Media released the film in the United States on DVD on August 21, 2012, and on Blu-Ray on December 15, 2015, and released the film on 4K Ultra HD Blu-ray on November 26, 2019, thus becoming the second domestically-produced anime release in that format, only after the German release of Your Name. The UK dub was released on Blu-ray in 2026, referred to as the "Yello Dub".

== Reception and legacy ==
Otaku USA's Daryl Surat wrote that Cobra is a type of classical pulp series and declared its protagonist is "part Han Solo and part Sean Connery-era James Bond" who does not fit the modern-day anime hero standard. Surat also said "when people speak of the 1980s as 'the golden age of anime sci-fi, it's because of things like Space Adventure Cobra". Sandra Scholes of Active Anime commented that it resembles "Barbarella, Zardoz and Star Wars all mixed together". Writing in the Fandom Post, Darius Washington thought it was "more like the Derek Flint films" than James Bond and that Cobra's adventures "could be comparable to worlds depicted in Outlaw Star and Bodacious Space Pirates". T. Strife from Anime News Network praised it for staying true to the manga and "holding its own with a modern audience". Strife stated that the series carries a theme of "love as a power beyond compare", which battles with the main character's playboyish air. Overall, Strife said the film is a masterpiece and classic that is worth viewing to know the medium's foundations. On the other hand, Charles Packer of Sci-Fi Online called the plot pure nonsense and the dialogue almost laughable. He said that the animation looks like a Saturday-morning cartoon, stating it crosses between that of an old anime and a new one, complete with interesting "psychedelic moments".

Matthew Sweet's 1991 music video "Girlfriend" used excerpts from the film, and became one of the most-watched videos on MTV.
