= Goku Midnight Eye =

Japanese manga series by Buichi Terasawa

- Goku Midnight Eye: Part Two OVA cover

Midnight Eye ゴクウ (Midnight Eye Gokū)
- Genre: Cyberpunk
- Manga
- Written by: Buichi Terasawa
- Published by: Gentosha
- English publisher: NA: Comics One; DrMaster
- Magazine: Comic Burger
- Original run: 1987 – 1989
- Volumes: 3 (Japan); 4 (North America)
- Original video animation
- Directed by: Yoshiaki Kawajiri
- Produced by: Naoko Takahashi; Tomiro Kuriyama
- Written by: Buichi Terasawa; Ryūzō Nakanishi
- Music by: Kazuhiko Toyama; Yukihide Takekawa
- Studio: Madhouse
- Licensed by: AUS: Manga Entertainment; NA: Discotek Media; UK: Manga Entertainment
- Released: January 27, 1989 – December 22, 1989
- Runtime: 60 minutes
- Episodes: 2

Goku Midnight Eye (Japanese: MIDNIGHT EYE ゴクウ, Hepburn: Midnight Eye Gokū) is a manga series by Buichi Terasawa about a detective named Goku Furinji (風林寺 悟空, Fūrinji Gokū) who gains a cybernetic eye implant that can control any computer system on the planet. It began serialization in the Jump (magazine line) magazine's Comic Burger in 1987. The manga has been published in English by ComicsOne and DrMaster.

== Story ==
Story The year is 2014, and the setting is Tokyo City after "the Great East Japan Earthquake".

Goku Furinji, a former police detective turned private investigator, is investigating a series of suicides among his former colleagues when his superiors urge him to stop. He ignores their advice and continues his investigation, but is captured and, like his fellow detectives, is nearly killed in a manner that makes it appear as a suicide. The suicides are the result of forced hypnosis by an enemy assassin. Goku makes a quick decision and stabs himself in the left eye to escape the trap.

A mysterious entity, observing the events, presents Goku with a prosthetic eye equipped with a sensor capable of detecting not only visible light but also infrared, ultraviolet, and X-rays, and a miniature terminal for a super-high-performance computer that can penetrate firewalls and access networks worldwide. He also grants Goku a flexible metal rod, the "Nyoibou," which can be controlled by the prosthetic eye. In today's world dominated by computers, Goku has obtained the "Eye" which could bring the world to ruin if he so wished. He uses this power to investigate and solve various cases.

== Video Anime ==
In 1989, Toei Video released two OVAs, "Goku" (hereafter referred to as "I") and "Goku II" (hereafter referred to as "II"), on VHS and LD in two volumes. "I" depicts the episode "Yoko" from the first episode of the original manga, while "II" depicts the episode "Yoko." A DVD version, "MIDNIGHT EYE Goku Complete DVD," was released on April 21, 2008, with the Toei VANIME label on the packaging.

A North American Blu-ray version was released in October 2023. A Japanese Blu-ray version was released by Toei Video on July 10, 2024.

== Reception ==
Helen McCarthy in 500 Essential Anime Movies calls the plot "incredibly silly", but praises "stylish locations" and "widely theatrical design ideas".
