= Unico =

Japanese manga series by Osamu Tezuka and its adaptations

- The cover for Unico volume 1 from the Osamu Tezuka Manga Complete Works edition, featuring the titular protagonist

ユニコ (Yuniko)
- Genre: Fantasy
- Manga
- Written by: Osamu Tezuka
- Published by: Sanrio
- English publisher: NA: Digital Manga Publishing
- Magazine: Ririka
- Original run: November 1976 – March 1979
- Volumes: 2
- Anime film

Unico: Black Cloud and White Feather
- Directed by: Toshio Hirata
- Produced by: Shintaro Tsuji; Valentín Pimstein
- Written by: Masaki Tsuji
- Music by: Yoko Narahashi; Akira Ito; Yukihide Takekawa; Mickie Yoshino
- Studio: Tezuka Productions
- Licensed by: Televisa; NA: Discotek Media
- Released: April 5, 1979 (Japan); February 18, 1980 (Mexico)
- Runtime: 25 minutes
- Anime film

The Fantastic Adventures of Unico
- Directed by: Toshio Hirata
- Produced by: Masao Maruyama; Tsunemasa Hatano; Valentín Pimstein
- Written by: Masaki Tsuji
- Music by: Masahiko Sato; IRUKA; BUZZ; Sumie Shima
- Studio: Madhouse
- Licensed by: Televisa; NA: Discotek Media
- Released: March 14, 1981 (Japan); September 27, 1982 (Mexico); May 12, 1983 (US)
- Runtime: 90 minutes
- Anime film

Unico in the Island of Magic
- Directed by: Moribi Murano
- Produced by: Masao Maruyama; Tsunemasa Hatano; Ernesto Alonso
- Written by: Masaki Tsuji
- Music by: Nozomi Aoki; Emiko Shiratori
- Studio: Madhouse
- Licensed by: Televisa; NA: Discotek Media
- Released: July 16, 1983 (Japan); November 10, 1983 (US); January 30, 1988 (Mexico)
- Runtime: 90 minutes

Unico (Japanese: ユニコ, Hepburn: Yuniko) is a Japanese manga series written and illustrated by Osamu Tezuka. It was serialized in Sanrio's shōjo manga magazine Lyrica from November 1976 to March 1979 and collected in two volumes. The series follows the titular unicorn as he uses his magic to help friends from around the world across different time periods. The series was drawn in a western style, being published in full color and read from left to right. It has since been published in different collections and has been adapted into film and comics. A modern-day reboot of the series began publication by Scholastic under its Graphix imprint in 2024.

== Plot ==
Unico is a young, innocent male unicorn who possesses a special ability to bring happiness to anyone near him. The story begins in ancient Greece with a young mortal girl named Psyche. She is the first friend to Unico, and is apparently so beautiful that the goddess Venus becomes jealous. The goddess attributes Psyche's beauty to her happiness and decides to separate the two. After kidnapping Unico in a pet contest, she calls upon the second star, Zephyrus, also known as the West Wind. The West Wind is commanded to take Unico through space and time, to the Hill of Oblivion with no memories of Psyche where he will wander forever. The West Wind takes pity on Unico, and decides to pass over the Hill of Oblivion and send him to different places in different time periods. Unico befriends the people he meets there and helps them achieve happiness, before the West Wind takes him away once more to avoid detection from Venus, wiping his memories in the process.

In the 1981 film adaptation The Fantastic Adventures of Unico, the gods believe that only they should have the ability to control others' emotions and decide that Unico must die. However, the gods feel that punishment may be too harsh and instead choose to send the West Wind to capture Unico and take him to the Hill of Oblivion. Upon learning of the West Wind's defiance, they send the Night Wind to capture Unico.

In the reboot series, Unicorns were born from "life's secret undercurrent", and the friendship between Unico and Psyche sends an inspiring force between people throughout time, angering Venus. After a long time of transporting Unico to different places, the West Wind follows a whisper promising to break the cycle, sending the unicorn to the modern day.

== Characters ==
=== Unico (ユニコ, Yuniko) ===
Voiced by: Hiroya Oka (1979 short film), Katsue Miwa (1981 and 1983 animated films), Matilde Vilariño (1984 Spanish dub for the 1981 movie), Rosa Romay (2010 Spanish DVD redub), Barbara Goodson (English dubs for 1981 and 1983 feature films), Akiko Yajima (2000), Rumiko Tezuka ("Dr. Pinoko's Forest Adventures"), Nana Mizuki (2010 TV audio adaptation), Ai Furihata (2020, Eshigami no Kizuna), Haruna Kawai (Kemono Friends 3), Hana Ayasaka (2025, Japanese promo for Unico: Awakening),
A baby unicorn that has the ability to spread happiness to everyone. Due to angering the gods over his ability to spread happiness and love, Unico's memories are frequently erased by The West Wind and transported to different locations and time periods to avoid being detected by the Night Wind and other gods (Venus in the manga and reboot series).
Unico is kind-hearted toward others, even the antagonists and villains he encounters in the original manga and other appearances in media. He gains special powers when someone truly loves him, such as extending his horn and using it as a weapon, flight, casting spells, and transforming into a winged unicorn. In the manga, he was the pet to Psyche, the Goddess of Soul who formed an intense love with each other. Unico and Psyche's love enrages Venus, who tries to separate them so she can regain her status, believing their happiness as the root of her beauty. When reuniting with his parents and siblings in the "Hometown Visit" chapter. Unico's parents reveal that he was their first child and that they let him stay with Psyche due to her caring for the unicorn.
When Unico feels truly loved by someone, he has the ability to transform into "A Mighty Unicorn" which depicts him as a grown unicorn. He typically uses this during moments of great danger or times of urgency. In this form, he has the ability to use stronger powers (such as growing huge) and moving as fast as a regular horse. Unico's Mighty Unicorn form maintains his original blue fur and pink colored hair/mane in the manga and reboot series. The 1979 pilot maintains Tezuka's original design of his adult form but keeps his black/grey colored mane based on Unico's earlier appearances in the manga. In the Sanrio films and 2000 short film, Unico's Mighty Unicorn form is redesigned where his entire body is colored white and silver.
Tezuka's earlier illustrations of Unico depicted him with black or dark pink colored hair/mane alongside his body being colored white or blue. His mouth area would also be colored white. In later appearances, his mane would be colored red instead of pink and his entire face was colored blue. His pupils was also originally colored orange, but was later changed to blue/green beginning with the film series by Sanrio. In the reboot series, he's depicted with black/grey colored pupils. Unico's hair in the original manga, the 2000 short, and reboot series resembled a horse's mane, but has a flatter, humanoid style from 1979 onwards. Unico is also frequently depicted wearing eyeliner (usually colored pink, orange, or yellow) and sometimes seen wearing a bow around his horn.
In the manga's final chapter and 1981 movie, Unico reveals to Beezle/Akuma-kun that having his horn removed causes him to lose all his powers. When Unico gives Beezle his horn, he tells him to bring it back before the end of the day. After Unico falls off a cliff and into a deep ocean due to hanging out with the demon (getting tricked by eating extremely hot food in the manga, roughhousing in the 1981 movie). The little unicorn spends minutes in the deep water before he ends up drowning. He gets brought back to life after Beezle returns his horn and saves him from drowning by transforming into an adult unicorn and takes him to higher ground.
Unico originated as an unnamed unicorn character Osamu Tezuka drew on his sketch book during his trip to Los Angeles, California in June 1976 to visit Sanrio's American headquarters during production of Metamorphoses. After returning from the United States, Tezuka later named the character "Unico" during his plane trip back to Japan before giving Unico his own manga series a few months later.
Between 1976 till 1979, Unico was the official mascot of Sanrio's magazine Lyrica. A Japanese magazine geared towards the elementary school demographic initially aimed towards Western audiences. In interviews Tezuka did for Lyrica, he stated that he created Unico to appeal towards American audiences and was his personal love letter to Walt Disney and his works.
On September 30, 2025, the Takarazuka City Council of Social Welfare in Takarazuka, Hyōgo chose Unico as the mascot for the "Red Feather Joint Fundraising". An event focusing on spreading kindness and solving social issues held from October 1, 2025, till November 30, 2025.

=== Chao (チャオ, Chao) ===
Voiced by: Kazuko Sugiyama (1981 film), Robin Levenson (English dub of the 1981 film), Ángel González (1984 Spanish dub), Ayari Fukamachi (2010 TV audio adaptation), Yurika Suda (2020, Eshigami no Kizuna)
A black and white cat who debuted in the manga chapter "The Cat on The Broomstick" who dreams of becoming a "Witch's Cat" for humans to respect her after getting abandoned.
In the manga, Chao first meets Unico after pulling him out of a pit of mud and washing him up after getting picked on by a flock of sheep. Chao decided to takes Unico into her owner's house where she cleans him up and allows him to rest for the evening. The next morning, Unico overhears Chao's human owners considering on abandoning her due to not behaving like a typical house cat and refusal to catch mice. Unico witnesses her get put inside a basket and dropped into a pond. After crying into Unico's arms, Chao decides to search for a witch in hopes of becoming a "Witch's Cat". Unico and Chao end up befriending an old lady known as "Granny" whom she mistakes as a real witch. After realizing Granny isn't a real witch, Unico decides to teach her magic by transforming Chao into a human girl. He only allows Chao to become a human girl for a limited time each day just to take care of the old lady. One afternoon, she encounters a mysterious human known as "Baron Ghost" who invites her to visit his manor. Unico becomes suspicious of Chao's sudden interest in doing human activities (mainly dressing in fancy outfit) and nervously reveals to him that she meet "An attractive human who rides a horse". When Unico discovers dead animals that were killed by Baron, he decides to put his foot down on further making her a human girl. After throwing a tantrum, Unico promises her that he will transform her into a human again if Baron's manor is safe enough. After noticing Baron's manor being non-threatening, Unico transforms her into a girl where she encounters Baron waiting for her to sing. In Baron's music room, Chao becomes scared over seeing the amount of mounted animals that he killed causing Baron to offer her a drink of wine. Unico secretly witnesses Chao drinking the entire bottle of wine causing her to become deeply intoxicated. Unico distracts Baron by making animals noises to save her. After Unico rescues Chao and escapes Baron's manor, they head back to Granny to prevent Baron from killing her. While Unico fights off Baron's hawks, Chao witness Granny becoming badly ill after getting attacked by Baron's hawks. Baron Ghost ends up rekidnapping her causing Unico to magically transform a group of woodland animals into humans to rescue her. After the animals defeat Baron, Chao ends up transforming back into a cat where she gets freed from a cage by a handsome human named "Shimashima". After learning that Shimashima is actually a cat, she ends up falling in love with him. Chao is last seen heading back to Granny's home worrying about her illness. Unico's final act of kindness is to use his healing powers to secretly heal Granny's illness.
In the 1981 movie, Chao befriends Unico after the titular unicorn accidentally falls into her basket (which is actually her home) floating down a river. After developing a close relationship with an Old Lady (whom she mistakes as a real witch), Unico secretly grants her wish to become a human girl but is temporary. Chao permanently becomes a human after she rescues The Old Lady (known as "Granny") from drowning with Unico's help. Similar to the original chapter, she falls in love with Baron but decides to sneak away from Unico while taking care of an injured monkey. While traveling to Baron's manor, she eats a berry causing her to become hypnotized as the forest around her grows thorns and leading her to Baron's manor. After getting drunk from Baron's wine, Unico decides to distract Baron by playing on an organ giving him time to rescue her. He decides to use his horn to drill to escape from Baron's manor. After losing to Baron during a sword fight, Baron chains Chao up to a flag pole. After Unico attacks Baron causing him to get impaled she gets unchained with assistance from Beezle. After Baron's demon form ends up killing Unico and breaking his horn. Chao runs up to Unico and begins crying as her tears are falling onto his body. After getting revived as a combination of Chao and Beezle's love, Unico manages to kill Baron as he gets sent down to hell. Chao rushes to Granny where the old lady recalls about a young unicorn who brings happiness to others but reveals that unicorns are forbidden to stay with their friends. Granny's revelation causes Chao to cry as she's last seen yelling Unico's name in the hopes of him coming back.
In the reboot series, Chloe was a city watch cat who rescues Unico from drowning, and after being abandoned by one of her owners, decides to find a witch to stay with to be treated better. Before befriending Unico, Chloe is first seen training Jenkins (Shimashima in the original manga) to behave like a proper watch cat. After drying up Unico, she tells him that she was mentored by Lily, a deceased cat that made her become a watch cat. Near Volume 1's conclusion, she falls in love with Toast the cat after Unico and the forest animals rescues her from Byron. When West Wind arrives, she witnesses West Wind restoring some of Unico's forgotten memories. Before Unico leaves, he gives both Chloe and Toast the ability to alternate between their human and cat forms. After Unico leaves, she alongside Toast continue to take care of Granny. Chloe's last seen talking to Toast about remaining hopeful to reunite with Unico someday.
In the original manga, her human form consists of her wearing a big red bow behind her head while her dress was colored black and wore red boots after her original cat form. In the 1981 film, her dress was changed to pink and wore red shoes. Her hair color was originally light brown but was changed to blue in the 1981 feature film. In the reboot, she is given whiskers in her cat form and wears a red bow around her neck. Her human form in the reboot series maintains her black dress with red lines and white apron from the original manga but wears white leggings, wears red shoes, and had a bow behind her back. She is named Chow in the Digital Manga Publishing translation, Katy in the dub of the 1981 film, and as Chloe in the English-language manga reboot series.
In Japanese interviews made before his passing, Osamu Tezuka stated that Chao is based and designed after his eldest daughter Rumiko Tezuka when she was a child.

=== Akuma-kun/Mr. Demon/Beezle (悪魔くん, Akumakun) ===
Voiced by: Junko Hori (1981 film), Cheryl Chase (English dub of the 1981 movie), Mari Pe Castro (1984 Spanish dub)
A young imp/demon and the son of Lucifer debuting in the manga's final chapter "Unico and Solitude". He is notably bratty and demanding when it comes to playing with Unico. Beezle refuses to become Unico's friend unless he gives him his horn. Unico allows Beezle to have his horn but promises Beezle to return it before the end of the day. He's also very dedicated to his job as "The Demon of Solitude" but slowly reconsiders if after slowly developing feelings for Unico. In the manga, he's depicted with black hair and green body while Beezle is depicted with dark brown hair and blue body in the 1981 movie.
In the manga, after Unico gives Beezle his horn, the demon ends up destroying Unico's homemade house and tricks him into trying hot food that only demons can tolerate causing Unico to fall into the ocean. In the 1981 movie, after roughhousing with Unico, he causes the foal to fall down the ocean. In both the manga and 1981 movie, Beezle is given his own horn by Unico after he tells him that he saved him out of love (which Beezle doesn't believe at first). The final scene in the manga shows him noticing that Unico is gone after the West Wind takes him away after Venus becomes aware of the West Wind's treachery.
In the 1981 movie, Beezle has the ability to shoot lightning and summon tiny rain clouds. He also assists on helping Unico rescue Chao from Baron Ghost after being called upon by a defeated Unico. After Unico gets temporarily killed by Baron's monstrous form, Beezle decides to remove his horn and puts it onto Unico in the hopes of bringing him back to life. After Unico defeats Baron, he witnesses the West Wind taking Unico away for good. He ends up following Unico and the West Wind by climbing the highest mountain and tallest tree as he angrily yells at the West Wind to bring him back. Unico's final interaction with Beezle is by magically giving him another horn before saying goodbye forever to both Beezle and Katy.

=== Sphinx/Bamoria (スフィンクス, Sufinkusu) ===
Voiced by: Youko Asagami (2000)
Based on the Sphinx character from Oedipus Rex, Sphinx is a crafty but loving mother debuting in the chapter "The Tale of the Fangs of Athens". Unico first encounters her while wandering through a desert where she asks him a series of riddles. While she initially comes across as intimidating, Sphinx truly cares about her son Piro. After she takes Unico to her cave to feed Piro, she gets killed by Oedipus after her riddle gets solved. In her dying moments, Sphinx pleads Unico to watch over Piro and promises to make him a "Brave and sturdy Sphinx". Near the chapter's conclusion, Sphinx reappears as a hallucination when Piro gets frightened by a group of stray dogs. After her son learns about the importance of self-defense, Piro decides to build a giant sand sculpture of her mother in her memory.
In the 2000 short film, Sphinx is very helpful and caring towards Unico despite her intimidating appearance. Unico and Tsubasa first encounter Sphinx in a desolate area where she asks them to solver her riddles in order to grant their wish. Unable to solve their riddle, Unico and Tsubasa try escaping her causing Sphinx to stop them in the process. After responding to Tsubasa's comment, Tsubasa ends up unknowingly solving her riddle. To reward them solving her riddle, Sphinx takes Unico and Tsubasa back to a time when humans can live on earth again. She decides to recruit the Time Fairy in order for them to travel back in time. Near the short's conclusion, Sphinx and Tsubasa ends up separated by Unico with Sphinx reborn as a human mother and Tsubasa as a newborn baby.
In the reboot series, she first appears in Unico: Awakening where she's depicted as a non-nonsense and stern sphinx. West Wind decides to secretly travel to a desert where she asks Sphinx to help her find a way to end Unico's endless cycle of forgetting his own identity. Initially, Sphinx tries attacking and almost eating West Wind over her association with Venus and grieving over her daughter's kidnapped by Venus.
In the manga and reboot series, Sphinx is depicted with light blue body and darker blue hair with yellow eyes. While in the 2000, she's depicted with gold colored fur, blonde hair, and reddish-brown eyes. In the manga, her size and height is similar to a real life lioness. However in the 2000 short and reboot series, Sphinx is massive with her size taking up a few pages in the reboot series. In the reboot, Sphinx is given an Egyptian style necklace, yellow eyeliner, and wears a headdress containing a third eye. Volume 3 reveals that her real name is "Bamoria".

=== Piro/Mars/Marusu (ピロ, Piro) ===
Voiced by: Noriko Tsukase (1983 film), Lara Cody (English dub of the 1983 movie), Eba Ojanguren (2010 Spanish DVD dub)
A young male/female sphinx and the son/daughter of Sphinx debuting in the manga's chapter "The Tale of the Fangs of Athens". He has green colored hair and tail tip while the rest of his fur is beige colored (sometimes depicted with orange fur in other appearances). In the manga, Piro first meets Unico after his mother takes him to his home inside a cave after not answering her riddle. After Unico discovers Piro's mother dying after attacked by Oedipus for answering her riddle, he becomes an orphan until Unico decides to become a parental figure to him after making a promise to make him a "Strong and Brave Sphinx". Unico teaches him about the importance of self-defense and becoming braver. After becoming brave and learning self-defense, he decides to make a special sand sculpture of his mother as a tribute to her before Unico gets separated from him.
In the 1983 movie, Unico and Cheri first encounter Marusu after searching for her mother from a group of crying demon babies. While her mother wasn't present, Marusu becomes Unico's ally to help defeat Kuruku and freeing everybody from their puppet forms. While short-tempered and calls Unico as "Bonehead" (only in the English dub), she is sweet and friendly when it comes to Unico feeling sad. Such as telling him that Cheri left him behind out of love so Unico won't have to suffer the same fate as her parents.
In the reboot series, Marusu is given an Egyptian inspired redesign where she's depicted with gold eyeliner, wears a headdress containing a third eye (hidden behind her hair bangs), and wears gold bracelets on her front paws. She also shares the same blue color palette as her mother where her fur is colored Turquoise while her hair and tail tip is colored dark blue. Similar to the 1983 movie, Marusu is depicted as a female sphinx cub. In the reboot series, Marusu gets kidnapped by Venus where the goddess tries torturing her to reveal Unico's whereabouts and powers.

=== Koun/Corn (コーン, Koun) ===
A young female unicorn and the older sister of Unico from the original manga debuting in the chapter "Hometown Visit". She has a similar appearance as Unico but is given a more feminine design. Corn has a peach-colored body, orange or strawberry blonde mane, blue eyes, and wears yellow eyelinder while her tail is white has a unique shape compared to her siblings. In some artwork by Tezuka, she's depicted with yellow colored fur. She's also the eldest sibling of Unico's brothers and sisters.
Corn first meets Unico after West Wind drops Unico off to his home where she emerges from a bush. She developed a major crush on Unico and insists on giving him a "Love Flower" before her mother reveals that she is related to Unico much to her dismay. While Corn doesn't mind being friends with her brother, she ends up heartbroken and decides to binge eat as much sweets and pastries as she can in the hopes of making herself prettier causing her to become fat. Before Unico leaves his family, she decides to give him a farewell kiss before getting taken away by The West Wind which she witnesses alone. The chapter's epilogue explains that she cried so much over Unico being gone that she reverted back to her cute normal form.

=== Unico's Mother (ユニコのお母さん, Yuniko no Okaa-san) ===
A grown female unicorn and the mother of Unico and Corn debuting in the manga's chapter "Hometown Visit". She's the eldest of Unico's family of unicorns.
In the manga, Unico first reunites with his mother after Corn chases him to their home. When seeing her son again, Unico's mother immediately starts showing love to Unico. Unico initially feels confused until he happily hugs his mother. She alongside her husband reveal to their son that Unico is the first unicorn to visit the mortal realm. They also explain to Unico that they decided to give him to Psyche due to her benevolent nature. After giving Unico to Psyche, she gave birth to 17 baby unicorns with Corn being the eldest sibling. She alongside her husband take Unico to a mountain built out of fruit that was picked from Mount Olympus. Her final interaction with her son is during bedtime when she reveals to Unico that "Unicorns don't have sorrow" where she explains that giving him to Psyche was equally a happy and sad experience.
In the 1981 movie, Unico's mother makes a non-speaking appearance during the film's prologue and given a semi-realistic design. In the prologue, she birthed 14 unicorn foals with Unico being the last of her offspring to get introduced. After The Gods disapproves Unico's ability to spread happiness to others on earth they send West Wind to separate Unico from his mother and siblings. While she's sleeping, West Wind decides to stop time in order to take Unico away to a safer location.
In the reboot series, Unico's mother is the very first animal to appear in the series. She's also the very first unicorn that came into existence where she alongside her other family of unicorns are established are being immortal creatures. In Volume 1's prologue, she was born from "Life's secret undercurrents" during the very beginning of humanity and used to wander across the mortal realm. During her youth, a young men witnesses her drinking from clean water near a lake who becomes the first human to witness a unicorn in person. As centuries progressed, her blue color palette was altered with her mane and tail changing to light orange or strawberry blonde while her body changed to light pink but maintains her youthful appearance. She eventually decided to live at an unknown location between the mortal realm and realm of the gods where she gave birth to 15 unicorn foals.

=== Garappachi/Garapachi/Nezumi (ガラッ八, Garappachi) ===
Voiced by: Kaneta Kimotsuki (1979 short film)
Garappachi is a father rat (mouse in the reboot series) and the husband of Okuzu/Kuzu debuting in the "Black Rain and White Clouds" chapter. He wears a small red hat and has white fur. In the manga, he alongside his wife first encounter Unico while searching through piles of trash to find food to feed their children.When he and his wife first encounter Unico, he mistakes him as a cat while Okuzu believes him to be a stuffed animal. When introducing himself to Unico, he reveals that his full name is "Garappachi Garbage". After he and his wife learn that Unico can't remember his own identity, Garappachi and Okuzu decide to allow him to stay at their home located underneath a human girl's bedroom. They both explain to Unico that the town they lived in used to be easy for rats to live before it got badly polluted making it difficult for them to find food. Garappachi decides to take Unico to Chico's room where he rediscovers himself as a unicorn from a book she owned about Greek Mythology.
In the 1979 pilot, he first meets Unico after the foal gets chased by a small wolf inside the sewers. Noticing him being frightened, Garappachi gives Unico crumbs since he notices that he's feeling hungry. Unico decides to ask him for more crumbs which he allows him to have. When he takes Unico to his home, he sadly allows his children to nibble on his tail due to running out of food. Unico feeling sorry for Garappachi's rat babies, unknowingly uses his magic which gifts Garappachi's children a small slice of cake to eat. Similar to the manga, he introduces Unico to Chico where he discovers himself as a unicorn. After destroying a factory that caused the area to become polluted, Unico returns to Chico's home to give her magic white flowers Unico got from West Wind to magically heal Chico. Garappachi's last interaction with Unico is seeing the young foal sadly saying "Goodbye" after asking where he's going.

== Media ==
=== Manga ===
Unico was serialized in Sanrio's shōjo manga magazine Ririka (Lyrica) from November 1976 to March 1979. Consisting of eight chapters split between issues, its chapters were collected in two volumes published by Sanrio. Kodansha published both volumes as part of the Osamu Tezuka Complete Works.

During the manga's original run from 1976 till 1979, Sanrio created three Unico picture books as part of Sanrio's Gift Book Collection which features characters exclusive to the book and has self-contained stories.

A second manga was serialized in the magazine Shougaku Ichinisei (First Grader) from 1980 to 1984 which is a separate continuity to the original manga. The series follows Unico's adventures with the boy Esuo, the dragon Ragon, and later Chao aimed at the elementary school demographic. 29 chapters were collected in 2 color columns in 1983 before all 40 chapters were collected in a single black-and-white volume in 1993 as part of the Osamu Tezuka Complete Works set.

In 2012, Digital Manga Publishing successfully funded a Kickstarter to publish the manga in full-color in English in Omnibus format. The company launched a second Kickstarter to reprint the manga in 2015.

==== OEL Reboot series ====
In Spring 2022, Tezuka Productions, along with illustrator duo Gurihiru and writer Samuel Sattin, launched an international Kickstarter campaign to fund a new manga titled Unico: Awakening (ユニコ: 目覚めのおはなし, Unico: Awakening Story) aka "Unico: An Original Manga", an original English-language manga series that would reboot the Unico franchise. The campaign was fully funded within 24 hours. In Summer 2023, the Kickstarter campaign announced that the first volume's initial 162-pages was bumped up to a total of 224-pages. On September 20, 2023, Scholastic Corporation announced that the manga series will be published by their Graphix imprint banner with the first volume, a reimaging of the chapter "The Cat on the Broomstick" was released August 6, 2024, in the United States. Tezuka Productions and Scholastic also announced the series to be expanded to four volumes alongside an activity book and handbooks to accompany them. On January 20, 2026, Tezuka Productions and Scholastic announced the series to extend to a total of eight volumes. On October 27, 2023, the manga series was announced to be given a Dutch translation with "De Fontein" publishing the manga series in the Netherlands with a Dutch release in Fall 2024. A preview of the first volume was sold as part of Free Comic Book Day 2024 on May 4, 2024. On September 10, 2024, in an interview on the website Licensing Magazine done to promote Brand Licensing Europe 2024, Reemsborko revealed that an animated television series or feature-length film adaptation of the Unico Awakening reboot series was in early stages of development.

As part of the Kickstarter campaign, an American mini-comic titled "Unico" by Steenz and American picture book by Madeline Copp were created for backers of the project under the "Unico: Awakening Artifacts" series. Which was a limited edition collectibles created by American cartoonists and international artists. Notable contributors include Japanese artist Peach Momoko (Demon Saga), mangaka Akira Himekawa, artist Tokitotokoro, Irish director and artist Tomm Moore (Wolfwalkers), mangaka Kamome Shirahama (Witch Hat Atelier), and mangaka Junko Mizuno.

An animated trailer for the series' first volume was uploaded to Scholastic's YouTube channel on June 6, 2024, animated by Denver Jackson. An animated music video called "Song of Unico" based on Volume 1 was uploaded on September 9, 2024, in both English and Japanese. On November 19, 2025, the series' first volume was announced to gain a wide release in Japan on December 18, 2025, to commemorate Unico's 50th Anniversary celebration in 2026 where it's known as Unico: Bond of the Stars (ユニコ星のきずな -覚醒編-, Unico: Hoshi no Kizuna – Kakusei-hen -) published by ShoProp Publishing. Tezuka Productions would also upload a Motion comic version of Volume 1's prologue on December 12, 2025, narrated by Takuya Satou with voices by Hana Ayasaka (Unico) and Ayako Sugio (Psyche and West Wind) to the company's Japanese YouTube channel.

A second volume titled Unico: Hunted based on the chapter "Black Rain and White Feathers" was announced at San Diego Comic-Con 2024 and was released on July 1, 2025. An animated trailer for the second volume was uploaded online on June 1, 2025.

A third volume, titled Unico: Lost, adapting the chapter "The Tale of the Fangs of Athens", was released on July 7, 2026. A fourth volume, titled Unico: Kidnapped, is slated to release on July 6, 2027.

=== Anime ===
==== Unico: Black Cloud, White Feather ====
In 1979, the same year the manga ended, Unico made his animated debut in Kuroi Kumo Shiroi Hane (Black Cloud, White Feather), an ecologically themed pilot film (for a proposed anime television series) which was later released directly to video. The short was shown to members of Tezuka Fan Club on April 30, 1979. The short adapts the manga chapter "Black Rain and White Feathers" serialized in 1977. In the pilot, Unico meets a young girl named Chiko (voiced by Minori Matsushima) in Canada who is ill because of the pollution from a nearby factory, and becomes determined to save Chiko's life by destroying the factory in order to cure her. Unico was voiced in this film by Hiroya Oka in Japanese and Rosa Romay in the Spanish dub in 1980. The songs was written by Yoko Narahashi, Akira Ito, Mickie Yoshino, and sung by Yukihide Takekawa. In the United States, the short was included as a bonus feature for the Blu-Ray re-release of Unico in the Island of Magic by Discotek Media with English subtitles. On August 9, 2025, the pilot was uploaded to Tezuka Production's official English YouTube channel for a limited time to promote the release of Unico: Hunted, the second volume of the OEL reboot series by Samuel Sattin, Gurihiru, and Scholastic.

==== The Fantastic Adventures of Unico ====
Although the TV series was not picked up, Unico was adapted into two feature-length anime films produced by Sanrio and Tezuka Productions with animation by Madhouse Studios.

Unico in the 1981 film

The first movie, titled The Fantastic Adventures of Unico in English and simply Unico in Japan, was released in Japanese theaters on March 14, 1981, in Mexico on Canal de las Estrellas on September 27, 1982, and direct-to-video in the United States by RCA Columbia Pictures Home Video on May 12, 1983. This musical film, narrated by singer–songwriter Iruka, directed by Toshio Hirata, and written by Masaki Tsuji, with animation by Yoshiaki Kawajiri, adapts the chapters "Unico and Solitude" and "The Cat on the Broomstick".

Unico (voiced by Katsue Miwa) gets sent into a place out of sight from the gods, leaving him all alone. He discovers the Demon of Solitude inside a temple, and angered by his presence, destroys the temple, revealing his son and successor, Beezle (voiced by Junko Hori). He takes advantage of his friendship with Unico, taking his horn and playing dangerous games, eventually leading to Unico falling into the sea. Beezle realizes how lonely he is and risks his life to save Unico, returning his horn and turning him into a mighty winged unicorn that takes them to dry land. As a symbol of friendship Unico grants Beezle with a horn of his own, before being whisked away to a forest.

Unico meets and befriends Katy (Chao in the Japanese version), an abandoned cat who wishes to be a witch and is finding one to live with. She and Unico find a small house belonging to an old woman, who Katy believes is a witch. Unico decides to turn her into a human girl, and she helps and befriends the old woman. She also meets Baron DeGhost, the lord of the forest. Against Unico's wishes, she decides to head to his castle, where he intends to seduce her. Unico rushes to save Katy, with Beezle insisting that the West Wind take him as well. The baron transforms into a demon after being seemingly impaled, and Beezle and Katy's grief transforms Unico into the winged unicorn once more, killing him for good before being taken again by the West Wind.

This movie includes several songs, most of which were performed by the movie's narrators, Iruka in the original version, Joan-Carol O'Connell in the English dub, and Rocío Banquells in the Spanish dub; however, Chao/Katy's recurring theme song, Chao no Kuroneko no Uta (The Song of Black Cat Chao), was sung by Chao's voice actresses, Kazuko Sugiyama in the Japanese version, Robin Levenson in the English dub, and Liliana Abud in the Spanish dub. The movie's other songs include Unico no Teemu (Unico's Theme), Hontou wa Subishikute/Lonely (Beezle/Akuma-kun's image song), and Majo Neko Chao (Witch Cat Chao)/Katy The Kitty Witch, all sung by Iruka, O'Connell or Banquells. The credits theme Ai koso subete/Love is Everything is sung both by Sumie Shima and the Japanese music group BUZZ. For the US release, all of the songs were dubbed into English along with the spoken dialogue, except for the ending song over the closing credits, which is an instrumental in the English version. Unico was voiced by Katsue Miwa in the original version, Barbara Goodson in the English dub, and Matilde Vilariño in the Spanish dub.

==== Unico in the Island of Magic ====
Moribi Murano (often miscredited as "Mami Sugino") directed the second movie, titled Maho no Shima e (ユニコ 魔法の島へ; To the Magic Island) in Japanese and Unico in the Island of Magic in English, which was released to Japanese theaters on July 16, 1983, five days before the release of the first Barefoot Gen movie, which used many of the same production staff. It was also released direct-to-video in the United States by RCA Columbia Pictures Home Video on November 10, 1983, and on Canal de las Estrellas in Mexico on January 30, 1988.

This film essentially picks up after The Fantastic Adventures of Unico with the West Wind dropping Unico off in a new location where the gods will be unable to locate him. The story begins with the West Wind erasing Unico's memory of the past events and he is left to once again fend for himself. Unico runs into a Heathcliff-like cat named Melvin Magnificat who is the apparent boss of the forest which Unico has stumbled upon. Later, Unico meets a kind-hearted young girl named Cheri (also spelled "Cherry", voiced by Sumi Shimamoto). Cheri's older brother, Toby (in Japanese, "Torubi", voiced by Shuichi Ikeda), is working for the evil Lord Kuruku (in Japanese, "Kukuruku"), who plans to turn all living creatures, animals and people alike, into unusual zombie-like beings called "Living Puppets" to be his slaves. Toby's job is to change people into Living Puppets and then lure the Living Puppets to Kuruku's fortress on Nightmare Island off the East Coast of Sweden in exchange for learning more of Kuruku's magic. His plan is to obey and serve until he learns enough to be the master, but fails to protect Cheri twice. Toby also takes on Melvin Magnificat ("Yamaneko" in Japanese) – who hates Unico because Unico "intruded" in "his" forest (the forest in which the West Wind left Unico) – as his assistant. After Cheri's parents and neighbors all get turned into Living Puppets, she and Unico team up to stop Kuruku.

Seeking advice from the Trojan Horse, Unico and Cheri learn that Kuruku is a puppet who was mistreated by his owners and discarded. He washed up at the Ends of the Earth – where all unwanted "junk" ends up eventually – and was brought to life with the power of 200 years of sunlight exposure, determined to take revenge on the human race. With help from the Sphinx's daughter (voiced by Noriko Tsukase; named "Marusu" in Japanese but not given a proper name in the English version), Unico – who realizes that Kuruku is really just a lonely, friendless creature – is able to break Kuruku's spell, but since Kuruku's hatred was the only thing that kept him alive, Kuruku dies, reverts to puppet form, and Cheri keeps him as a toy. Soon afterward, the West Wind finds Unico and spirits him away once again to avoid detection by the gods.

As with the first movie, the second movie's ending song (Do-Re-Mi-Fa Lullaby performed by Emiko Shiratori) became an instrumental in the Spanish and English dub. Katsue Miwa in the original version and Barbara Goodson in the English dub reprised their roles as Unico in this film, while Rosa Romay played Unico in the Spanish dub.

==== Saving Our Fragile Earth: Unico Special ====
Saving Our Fragile Earth: Unico Special is a 2000 animated short starring Unico directed by Masayoshi Nishita that was a Japanese–Chinese co-production.

The short involves Unico visiting a world where humanity has become extinct and the earth has become uninhabitable. After befriending Tsubasa, a wooden creature who believes himself to be human. Alongside Sphinx from the chapter "The Tale of the Fangs of Athens" and The Spirit of Time. Unico travels back in time to prevent humans from badly polluting the earth where they encounter a Demon Monster enraged over humans mistreating the environment. After calming down the monster, Unico conveniences him that not all humans are careless and successfully befriending the former antagonist. The short ends with Unico getting his memories erased and traveling to another location while Tsubasa and Sphinx are reincarnated as a human baby and human mother.

Unico is voiced by Aracely Arámbula in the Spanish dub, while Akiko Yajima voiced the character in the original Japanese version.

==== Voice cast ====
===== The Fantastic Adventures of Unico =====
Character	Original	English	Spanish
Unico	Katsue Miwa	Barbara Goodson	Matilde Vilariño
Night/The Night Wind	Ryouko Kitamiya	Louise Chamis	Silvia Derbez
Chao/Katy	Kazuko Sugiyama	Robin Levenson	Liliana Abud
Beezle	Junko Hori	Cheryl Chase	Irma Lozano
Baron/Baron DeGhost	Makio Inoue	Dave Mallow	Sergio Jiménez
Narrator	Iruka	J.C. Henning	Rocío Banquells
Elder/Old Woman	Taeko Nakanishi	Louise Chamis	Ignacio López Tarso
West/The West Wind	Chieko Baishô	Diane Lander	Susana Dosamantes
Gods	Ichirō Nagai; Jōji Yanami; Isamu Tanonaka; Kōji Yada	Jan Rabson; Ron Gans; Ardwight Chamberlain; Michael Sorich	Unknown

=== Additional English Voices ===
- Ardwight Chamberlain (The Devil of Solitude)

==== Unico in the Island of Magic ====
Character	Original	English	Spanish
Unico	Katsue Miwa	Barbara Goodson	Rosa Romay
West Wind	Chieko Baishô	Diane Lander	Christian Bach
Sheri/Cheri	Sumi Shimamoto	Marbry Steward	Laura Flores
Kuruku/Lord Kuruku	Fujio Tokita	Jan Rabson	Carlos Bracho
Tolby/Toby	Shûichi Ikeda	Etienne Bannliett	José Alonso
Yamaneko/Melvin the Magnificat	Ichirô Nagai	Michael Sorich	Sergio Jiménez
Marusu/Spinx's Daughter	Noriko Tsukase	Lara Cody	Ana Martin
Trojan Horse	Ryûji Saikachi	Ron Gans	Chespirito
Sheri's Father/Cheri's Father	Kazuo Harada	Ron Gans	Ricardo Blume
Melvin's Lackey 1	Kenichi Ogata	Jan Rabson	Unknown
Melvin's Lackey 2	Eken Mine	Ardwight Chamberlain	Unknown
Sheri's Mother	Kotoe Taichi	Unknown	Unknown
Roller Dragon	Unknown	Ardwight Chamberlain	Unknown
Baby Demons	Unknown	Cheryl Chase	Unknown

==== Home media ====
The 1981 and 1983 theatrical films were dubbed into English and received North American exposure through VHS releases in the mid-1980s and airings on the Disney Channel.

In 2012, Discotek Media released The Fantastic Adventures of Unico and Unico in the Island of Magic on DVD, with both the Japanese and English audio tracks. The 1979 Unico pilot film was featured as an English-subtitled extra on the Island of Magic DVD.

Discotek Media re-released The Fantastic Adventures of Unico and Unico in the Island of Magic on a double-feature DVD on April 29, 2014. The DVD did not contain the pilot. Discotek also released the Blu-ray versions of both films in 2014. Crunchyroll began streaming the films online in 2016, while RetroCrush began streaming them in 2020.

=== Other appearances ===
Unico made cameo appearances in several episodes of the Black Jack TV series adapted from the Black Jack manga.

Unico also made an appearance in the Game Boy Advance game Astro Boy: Omega Factor, where he gives Astro Boy the ability to have a warm and tender talk with Dr. Tenma, his father. Unico also appears in the Astro Boy manga in a comic book. In the story, he is Dr. Foola's inspiration for a new robot: a mechanical unicorn.

Unico can also be seen in a brief cameo in Columns GB: Osamu Tezuka Characters for the Game Boy Color.

The Unico films (the pilot, Fantastic Adventures, and Island of Magic) were produced by Sanrio, so some of Sanrio's characters, such as Hello Kitty, Tuxedo Sam, and the Little Twin Stars, make cameo appearances in the films.

Unico co-starred alongside Pinoko in the 2005 animated short Dr. Pinoko's Forest Adventures. In the short, Unico was voiced by Rumiko Tezuka, Osamu Tezuka's eldest sibling and daughter.

On February 18, 2021, Tezuka Productions and Kemono Friends collaborated to add Unico alongside Phoenix into the Japanese mobile game Kemono Friends 3 as special DLC characters. The titular character was given a humanized design and depicted as a female. Unico and Phoenix would later returns to Kemono Friends 3 on October 30, 2025, which introduces a female version of Kimba the White Lion (known as Leo in Japan). In the game, Unico is voiced by Haruna Kawai.

== Reception ==
Writing for Anime News Network, Shaenon K. Garrity called Unico "a good-looking manga", saying the "artwork looks like a comic-book version of the prettiest Disney movie never made".

== See also ==
- List of Osamu Tezuka anime
- List of Osamu Tezuka manga
- Osamu Tezuka's Star System
