= Katsue Miwa =

Japanese voice actress and narrator (1943–2024)

- 三輪 勝恵
- Born: Katsue Uchiyama (内山 かつゑ); October 12, 1943; Osaka Prefecture, Japan
- Died: June 19, 2024 (aged 80)
- Other name: Katsue-chan (カツエちゃん)
- Occupations: Voice actress; narrator
- Years active: 1960–2024
- Agent: Aoni Production
- Website: Official profile

Katsue Uchiyama (内山 かつゑ, Uchiyama Katsue; October 12, 1943 – June 19, 2024), known professionally as Katsue Miwa (三輪 勝恵, Miwa Katsue) was a Japanese voice actress and narrator from Osaka affiliated with Aoni Production. She began her career in 1960 and starred in a number of voice-over roles for various anime, video games, films, and television commercials, most famously voicing the titular character of the Perman franchise from 1967 to 2024.

== Career ==
Miwa was born in Osaka Prefecture on October 12, 1943. She moved at four years old and grew up in Minato Ward, Tokyo.

During her childhood, Miwa worked as a child actress at the NHK Tokyo Broadcasting Children's Theatre Company. While there, she was cast as the voice of Foo in the puppet show Boo Foo Woo on Okaasan to Issho.

Miwa graduated from Kokugakuin High School and then from the Department of Japanese Literature, Faculty of Letters, Kokugakuin University. She wanted to become a Japanese language teacher and had even done teaching practice at her former junior high school. Despite these hard efforts, she was not able to get a look in the eye and was shocked when students would tease her and tell her that her voice sounded like a manga character. They even referred to her with her first name without using any honorifics, so she gave up on becoming a teacher and would go on to become a voice actress.

=== Death ===
Miwa died from pulmonary embolism on June 19, 2024, at the age of 80. Her death was announced by Aoni a month later.

== Personality ==
Her voice range was described as "a fairytale-like, dreamy mezzo-soprano". Her vocal range was E-D, and boys' voices (D-B). Her dialects were Kansai dialect and Osaka dialect.

Miwa has appeared in various anime, television shows, and foreign films. With her recognizably cute voice, she portrayed approachable, ordinary boys, but also voiced roles like energetic girls, adult women, and elderly women. She also made appearances in many television commercials and did narration.

Her personal qualifications and licenses included a medium-sized vehicle license and a large motorcycle license. She also had a first-grade junior high school teacher's license and a second-grade senior high school teacher's license.

Her main hobby was admiring wild plants and her special skill was creating small crafts.

=== Episodes ===
In 2022, she expressed, "I would like to play a cute character like Catherine (played by Manon Gaurin) from the Teijin (CM) again."

In the Perman franchise, Miwa famously provided the voice of the titular character Perman #1 (Mitsuo Suwa). She voiced the role from 1967 until her death in 2024. She reprised the role in short films exclusively screened at the Fujiko F. Fujio Museum and the 2005 Doraemon anime. She also performed the Perman anime theme songs "Our Perman" (1967 series) and "Come on, Perman" (1983 series).

== Filmography ==
=== Television animation ===
List of voice performances in television animation
Year	Title	Role	Notes	Source
1967	Gokū no Daibōken	Additional voice		
1967–68	Perman	Perman #1 (Mitsuo Suwa)	Lead role	
1967	The Golden Bat	Agartha		
1967	Osomatsu-kun	Additional voice		
1968	Wanpaku Tanteidan	Midori, Eriko		
1968	The Monster Kid	Additional voice		
1968	Humanoid Monster Bem	Girl Lulu	Ep. 5	
1968	GeGeGe no Kitarō	Additional voice		
1969	Space Journey: The First Dream of Wonder-kun	Wonder	Lead role	
1969	Ninpu Kamui Gaiden	Ryūta		
1969	Dororo	Ku Sukero		
1969	The Genie Family	Kan-chan's grandmother		
1969–72	Moomin	Gaogao, Tofusu		
1970–76	Sazae-san	Takuma Nishihara, Hamatarō Shioshima, Īda	First voice of Takuma Nishihara	
1971	Tiger Mask	Megumi Yoshimizu		
1974–75	Calimero	Calimero	Lead role	
1979	Japanese Masterpiece Fairy Tale Series: Heart of the Red Bird	Gon		
1980	Dora.Q.Perman	Perman #1 (Mitsuo Suwa)	Television special	
1980	The Adventures of Tom Sawyer	Lisette	Eps. 26-30	
1980–82	The Monster Kid	Hiroshi Ichikawa, Prankster		
1980–81	The Wonderful Adventures of Nils	Nielsen, George, additional voices		
1981	Ai no Gakko Cuore Monogatari	Nino Bottini		
1981–83	Chie the Brat	Hirame Hirayama		
1981	Animated Parent and Child Theatre	Azusa Yamato		
1981–83	Dr. Slump and Arale-chan	Sparrow		
1982–83	Asari-chan	Asari Hamano	Lead role	
1982	Acrobunch	Miki Rando		
1982	Boku Patalliro!	Mary Jane	In the credits, she was incorrectly credited as "Katsue Miwa" (三輪勝江)	
1983–85	Perman	Perman #1 (Mitsuo Suwa)	Lead role	
1983	Nanako SOS	Dracula Boy, Maya Hayasaka	Dracula Boy in Ep. 3, Maya Hayasaka in Ep. 23	
1983	Stop!! Hibari-kun	Girl		
1984	Chikkun Takkun	Penko		
1984	Memole of the Pointed Hat	Monica		
1985–87	Little Ghost Q-Tarō	Shōta Ōhara	Main role	
1985	Lupin the 3rd Part III	Julia	Ep. 43	
1985–87	GeGeGe no Kitarō	Baby, Kiku, Witch, Miyoshi		
1986	Mr. Pen Pen	Asari Hamano		
1987	Dragon Ball	Boy, Shoken	Shoken in Ep. 80	
1988–89	The Secret of Akko-chan	Admiral		
1989	Bikkuriman	The Chestnut Core		
1989	City Hunter 2	Kimiko Takeda		
1990	Let's Go! Anpanman	Dalman, Petalin the Clingy Bug	First voice	
1991	Chie the Brat: Chie's Struggle	Hirame Hirayama		
1997	GeGeGe no Kitarō	Snow Child	Debuts in Ep. 58	
1998	Yu-Gi-Oh!	Mokuba Kaiba		
2002	Mirmo!	Harmo		
2006	Law of Ueki	Ban's "Living Sacred Treasure"		
2007	One Piece	Lil	Eps. 326–335	
2008	Someday's Dreamers II: Sora	Old Woman, Grandmother		
2008	Hell Girl: Three Vessels	Momo	Ep. 8	
2009	Negibōzu no Asatarō	Kumquat no Otami		
2009	Kaidan Restaurant	Zenmaiba-san	Eps. 8 and 17	
2013	Doraemon	Perman #1 (Mitsuo Suwa)	Ep. 577	
2015	Kurayami Santa	Jizō Honekami, Auntie Peddler		

=== Theatrical animation ===
List of voice performances in theatrical animation
Year	Title	Role	Notes	Source
1968	Andersen Monogatari Match Uri no Shōjo	Mimi		
1970	Misuke in the Land of Ice	Nally		
1980	Phoenix 2772: Space Firebird	Olga		
1981	The Monster Kid: Invitation to Monster Land	Hiroshi Ichikawa		
1981	The Fantastic Adventures of Unico	Unico	Lead role	
1982	Asari-chan: The Loving Fairy Tale Girl	Asari Hamano	Lead role	
1982	The Monster Kid: The Demon Sword	Hiroshi Ichikawa		
1983	Perman: The Birdman Has Arrived!!	Perman #1 (Mitsuo Suwa)	Lead role	
1983	Unico in the Island of Magic	Unico	Lead role	
1984	Ninja Hattori-kun + Perman: Superpower Wars	Perman #1 (Mitsuo Suwa)	Lead role	
1985	Ninja Hattori-kun + Perman: Ninja Beast Jippō vs. Miracle Egg	Perman #1 (Mitsuo Suwa)	Lead role	
1986	Little Ghost Q-Tarō: Jump Out! Bake-Bake Great Operation	Shōta Ōhara		
1986	Ge Ge Ge no Kitarō: Yōkai Daisensō	Witch		
1987	The Golden Bird	Prince Hans		
1987	Little Ghost Q-Tarō: Fly! Operation 1/100	Shōta Ōhara		
1991	Kayoko's Diary	Kayoko Nakane		
1995	The Wonderful Adventures of Nils	Nilsen		
2003	Pa-Pa-Pa The Movie: Perman	Perman #1 (Mitsuo Suwa)	Short film	
2004	Pa-Pa-Pa The Movie: Perman - Octopus with a Pop! Legs with a Pon!	Perman #1 (Mitsuo Suwa)	Short film	
2016	Pop in Q	Jinbat	Final film role	

=== Original video animation (OVA) ===
List of voice performances in original video animation
Year	Title	Role	Notes	Source
1987	Robot Carnival	Fukusuke		
1991	Fox Wood Tales	Other voices		
1992	Kitty and Mimmy's Happy Birthday	Chip		
1996	Jigoku Sensei Nube	Other voices		
1998	Hell Teacher: Jigoku Sensei Nobe: Bukimi-chan: The Mystery of the Seven Mysteries	Bukimi-chan		

=== Short film animation ===
List of voice performances in short film animation
Year	Title	Role	Notes	Source
2011	Doraemon & Perman: Close Call!?	Perman #1 (Mitsuo Suwa)		
2021	Doraemon & F-Character All-Stars: Slightly Mysterious Bullet Train (Express)!	Perman #1 (Mitsuo Suwa)		
2024	Doraemon & F-Character All-Stars: The City of Dreams, F Land	Perman #1 (Mitsuo Suwa)	Final anime voice acting role	

=== Puppet shows ===
List of voice performances in puppet shows
Year	Title	Role	Notes	Source
1960–67	Boo Foo Woo	Foo	Lead role	

=== Foreign dub roles ===
- Charlie and the Chocolate Factory (2008 NTV edition): Veruca Salt (Julia Winter)
- Peanuts: Lucy Van Pelt
- Woody Woodpecker: Woody Woodpecker

=== Video games ===
List of voice performances in video games
Year	Title	Role	Notes	Source
1997	Ghost in the Shell	Fuchikoma		
2000	Super Magnetic Neo	Pinki		
2003	Pop'n Music 10	Vocalist of "Come on, Perman"		
2007	Battle Fantasia	Watson Livingston		
2009	Tales of the World: Radiant Mythology 2	Panille		
2013	JoJo's Bizarre Adventure: All-Star Battle	Enya Geil		
