= J.C. Henning =

American actress

JC Henning((1954)) is an American film, television and voice actress. She has appeared in several film and television projects and has appeared on stage productions. She has also voiced in several English dubs for Japanese anime. Since 2000, she has been an Audio Describer of live theatre and opera for blind and visually impaired theatre patrons.

== Filmography ==
=== Film roles ===
Year	Title	Role	Notes
1987	Retribution	Paramedic	Credited as Joan-Carol Kent
1999	Legal Counsel	Camilla Elizabeth Wentworth	
2010	Awakening Arthur	Mabel	Short film
2010	Yes Man	Linda	Short film
2011	Allegiance	Frau Decker	Short film
2012	Until College	Mom	Short film
2013	Exedia Nation 3D	Syslink Mainframe	Voice; Short film
2013	Playing It Straight	Martha Brown	Short film
2014	Reunion	Marilyn	Short film
2014	Whatever You Want	Rasima	Short film
2015	Everything's Gonna Be Ok	Animated Woman	Short film

=== Television roles ===
Year	Title	Role	Notes
1976	The Story of David	Elga	TV movie
1981	Days of Our Lives	Babysitter Bonnie	
1981	Red Flag: The Ultimate Game	Lt. Linda Fowles	TV movie
1985	The A-Team	Waitress	Ep, The Road to Hope (Season 4, Ep. 5)
2008	Fridays	Russian Woman	Two episodes

=== Voice Roles ===
- Armitage III - Jessup's Associate
- Cybuster - Safine
- D.N.A. Sights 999.9 - Mello
- Doomed Megalopolis - Yukari
- Kyo Kara Maoh! - Susanna Julia von Wincott
- Lily C.A.T. - Dorothy
- The Castle of Cagliostro - Clarisse d'Cagliostro (Streamline dub)
- Space Adventure Cobra: The Movie - Lady Armoroid
- The Fantastic Adventures of Unico - Narrator
- Hajime no Ippo - Ippo's mom
