= The Story of David =

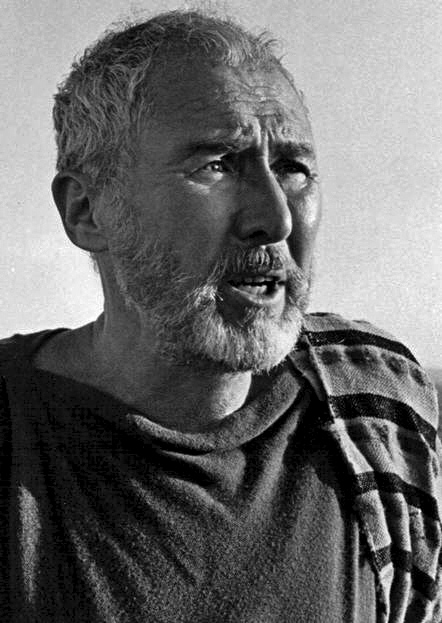
- Anthony Quayle as King Saul
- Written by: Ernest Kinoy
- Directed by: David Lowell Rich; Alex Segal
- Starring: Timothy Bottoms; Anthony Quayle; Norman Rodway
- Music by: Laurence Rosenthal
- Country of origin: United States
- Original language: English

Production
- Producer: Mildred Freed Alberg
- Cinematography: John Coquillon
- Editor: Sidney Katz
- Running time: 191 minutes
- Production companies: Columbia Pictures Television; Mildred Freed Alberg Productions

Original release
- Network: ABC
- Release: April 9, 1976

The Story of David is a 1976 two-part American television film dramatizing the Biblical story of King David. It stars Timothy Bottoms as the young David, Keith Michell as the older David, Anthony Quayle as King Saul, and Jane Seymour as Bathsheba. Produced by Columbia Pictures Television for the American Broadcasting Company (ABC-TV), it premiered on 9 April 1976, with its second part on the 11th. It was filmed in Israel and Spain.

The Story of David is akin to a sequel to The Story of Jacob and Joseph (1974), also produced for ABC-TV (broadcast two years earlier) and involving many of the same cast and crew.

== Plot summary ==
The narrative follows David's life from the time he was a boy shepherd to his death as the aged King of Israel.

Part 1: David and King Saul relates to the exploits of the young David (Bottoms) and his fraught relations with King Saul (Quayle). It begins with David as a humble shepherd who becomes lyre player and armourer to the King who is distraught after the prophet Samuel has chastised him for failing to follow the instructions of the Israelite god, Yahweh, in a battle. Samuel informs Saul that Yahweh will anoint another king in his place. Saul is counseled by his general and old friend Abner. Saul periodically withdraws due to an oppressive illness and, initially, David's music soothes his troubled mind. But Saul is filled with jealous rage when David becomes hero to his people after prevailing in single combat against Goliath and in a subsequent military victory over the Philistines. Although Saul has made David "Captain of a Thousand" and allowed him to marry his daughter Michal after another military exploit, in a private moment he makes an attempt on David's life with his spear, thus forcing him to flee. David is highly conflicted over his devotion to Saul as Yahweh's first anointed King over the people. He will not kill Saul, despite Saul's constant attempts on his own life, as he feels it will offend the deity. Saul's son Jonathan, the heir-apparent, secretly pledges his devotion to the fugitive David and insists on becoming blood brother to David ritualistically. Saul dies in battle and David, having previously been anointed in secret by Samuel, assumes the throne.

Part 2: David the King begins with a mature David (Michell) and tells the story of his sinning with Bathseba (Seymour), including the scenes with her bath and their subsequent love-making. As David ages he is challenged by the treason of one of his sons, and eventually passes the crown on to another of his sons, Solomon.

== Cast ==
Part 1

- Timothy Bottoms as David
- Anthony Quayle as King Saul
- Norman Rodway as Joab
- Oded Teomi as Jonathan
- Yehuda Efroni as Younger Abner
- Tony Tarruella as Goliath
- Ahuva Yuval as Abigail
- Irit Benzer as Michal
- Avraham Ben-Yosef as Ahimelech
- Yakar Semach as Abiathar
- Ilan Dar as Eliab
- Dudu Topaz as Abinadab
- Ori Levy as Gaza

Part 2

- Keith Michell as Older David
- Jane Seymour as Bathsheba
- Susan Hampshire as Michal
- Koya Reuben as Shammab
- Brian Blessed as Abner
- Barry Morse as Jehosephat
- David Collings as Nathan
- Nelson Modling as Absolom
- Terrence Hardiman as Uriah
- Jeanette Sterke as Abigail
- David Nielson as Amnon
- Eric Chapman as Seriah
- J.C. Henning as Elga
- Maureen O'Connell as Maacah
- Dov Reiser as Witch of Endor
- Mark Dignam as Samuel/Achish (uncredited)
