= You're Under Arrest =

You're Under Arrest may refer to:

- You're Under Arrest (manga), a manga and anime franchise created by Kōsuke Fujishima
- You're Under Arrest (Miles Davis album), 1985
- You're Under Arrest (Serge Gainsbourg album), 1987
- "You're under arrest", a saying used by police or other law enforcement officers when making an arrest
- "You're Under Arrest" (song), a 2026 song by South Korean girl group Illit
