= The Space Adventure (video game) =

1991 video game

- North American Sega CD box art
- Developer: Hudson Soft
- Publisher: Hudson Soft
- Platforms: PC Engine CD, Sega CD
- Release: PC Engine CD: JP: June 7, 1991; Sega CD: NA: 1995; EU: July 1995
- Genre: Adventure
- Mode: Single-player

The Space Adventure – Cobra: The Legendary Bandit (コブラII: 伝説の男, Kobura II: Densetsu no Otoko), also known simply as The Space Adventure, is an adventure game released for the PC Engine CD-ROM² System in 1991 in Japan and for the Sega CD in 1995 in North America and Europe. It is the sequel to a Japan only game titled Cobra: Kokuryuuou no Densetsu released for the PC Engine CD in 1989, both being based on the manga and anime series Cobra by Buichi Terasawa. The game was developed and published by Hudson Soft and was one of the last games to be published for the Sega CD in both North America and Europe. The format of the game is similar to Snatcher while the plot is based on one of Cobra's early adventures.

The game is the first anime-licensed game to receive a Mature rating from the ESRB.

== Plot ==
The player takes the role of the manga hero Cobra, who after walking into a bar, learns that a bounty has been placed on his head by the Galaxy Patrol and that he is being hunted by a bounty hunter named Jane Royal. After it is discovered that Cobra's archenemy Crystal Boy is after a treasure hidden by Jane's father, the location of which he encoded in the form of tattoos on his triplet daughters, Cobra and Jane agree to join forces to locate her sisters and defeat Crystal Boy.

== Reception ==
GamePro panned the game, comparing it unfavorably to Snatcher. They criticized the poorly illustrated story sequences, the shortage of voice overs and the gameplay.

Next Generation reviewed the Sega CD version of the game, rating it one star out of five.
