= Cobra (manga) =

Japanese manga series by Buichi Terasawa

- Cover of first tankōbon volume, featuring Cobra (left) and Lady Armaroid (right)

コブラ (Kobura)
- Genre: Adventure; Science fiction comedy; Space opera
- Manga
- Written by: Buichi Terasawa
- Published by: Shueisha
- English publisher: NA: Viz Media (former); Creek & River (digital; select full-color arcs)
- Imprint: Jump Comics
- Magazine: Weekly Shōnen Jump
- Original run: November 6, 1978 – November 12, 1984
- Volumes: 18
- Anime film
- Space Adventure Cobra: The Movie (1982)
- Anime television series

Space Cobra
- Directed by: Osamu Dezaki; Yoshio Takeuchi
- Produced by: Shunzo Kato; Yukimasa Ohno
- Written by: Haruya Yamazaki; Kosuke Miki; Kenji Terada
- Music by: Kentarō Haneda
- Studio: Tokyo Movie Shinsha
- Licensed by: NA: Discotek Media
- Original network: Fuji TV
- Original run: October 7, 1982 – May 19, 1983
- Episodes: 31
- Manga

Cobra: Legend of the Holy Knight
- Written by: Buichi Terasawa
- Published by: Shueisha
- Imprint: Jump Comics Deluxe
- Magazine: Super Jump
- Original run: 1986 – 1988
- Volumes: 1
- Manga

Space Adventure Cobra (Shueisha); Cobra the Space Pirate (Media Factory)
- Written by: Buichi Terasawa
- Published by: Shueisha (1995–2002); Media Factory (2005–2006)
- English publisher: Creek & River (digital)
- Imprint: Jump Comics Deluxe (Shueisha); MF Comics (Media Factory)
- Magazine: Super Jump (1995–2002); Monthly Comic Flapper (2005–2006)
- Original run: 1995 – 2006
- Volumes: 11 (Shueisha); 8 (Media Factory)
- Original video animation

Cobra the Animation
- Directed by: Buichi Terasawa; Kenichi Maejima (5–6)
- Produced by: Harumi Suzuki; Kensaku Yamanaka; Mariko Kusuhara; Masako Yoshikawa; Masashi Ikeda
- Written by: Buichi Terasawa; Mitsuyo Suenaga (5–6)
- Music by: Yoshihiro Ike
- Studio: Magic Bus
- Licensed by: NA: Sentai Filmworks
- Released: August 29, 2008 – June 26, 2009
- Episodes: 6
- Anime television series

Cobra the Animation
- Directed by: Keizo Shimizu
- Produced by: Harumi Suzuki; Kensaku Yamanaka; Mariko Kusuhara; Masako Yoshikawa; Masashi Ikeda
- Written by: Kazumi Koide
- Music by: Yoshihiro Ike
- Studio: Magic Bus
- Licensed by: NA: Sentai Filmworks
- Original network: BS11
- Original run: January 2, 2010 – March 27, 2010
- Episodes: 13
- Manga

Cobra: Over the Rainbow
- Written by: Buichi Terasawa
- Published by: Kadokawa Corporation
- Imprint: Comic Hu
- Magazine: Comic Walker; Niconico Manga
- Original run: November 19, 2019 – April 19, 2020
- icon

Cobra (Japanese: コブラ, Hepburn: Kobura) is a Japanese manga series written and illustrated by Buichi Terasawa. Set in the far future, the series tells the story of Cobra, who lives an adventurous life until his enemies begin to hunt him down. Cobra surgically alters his face and erases his own memory to hide from his foes and have a normal life. Eventually, he regains his memories and reunites with his former partner Lady Armaroid. Terasawa devised it as a mix of Spaghetti Western and samurai stories, and aspects of films, varying from James Bond to Disney.

The manga was originally serialized in Shueisha's Weekly Shōnen Jump from November 1978 to November 1984. Later, Shueisha collected the chapters and published them in 18 tankōbon volumes. The Cobra manga spawned various sequel manga series, one-shots, a 1982 feature-length anime film, two anime television series (a 31-episode series in 1982, and a 13-episode series in 2010), two original video animations (OVAs) in 2008–2009, audio albums, video games, and other merchandise.

In the United States, portions of the manga were published by Viz Media in 1990 and the complete sequel series, alongside full-color remakes of select story arcs from the original manga, was published in Kindle format by Creek & River in 2015. The feature film was licensed by Tara for its release in American theaters and by Manga Entertainment in British theaters in 1995. Urban Vision and Discotek Media released it for home video market, while Madman Entertainment acquired it for the Australasian region's release. The anime series was licensed in North America by Nozomi Entertainment and Discotek Media.

In Japan, the Cobra manga has sold 50 million copies, making it one of Weekly Shōnen Jump's best-selling manga series of all time. Publications for manga, anime and other media have compared the series to Star Wars and Barbarella, and the main character's attitude to James Bond. Its film adaptation received mixed reviews, and the original anime series as well as Cobra the Animation has been well received by reviewers. The anime series was very popular in France in the 1980s and French-speaking filmmakers and studios have attempted to adapt it into live-action films or animated series in the 2000s and in the 2010s.

== Plot ==
In the far future, an office worker named Johnson leads a dull and mundane life. One Sunday morning, his robotic servant Ben suggests that he go to the Trip Movie Corporation—a company that enables its customers to experience a dream as though it were a reality. Johnson asks to be a king of a harem and to command a battlestar.

In his dream, however, Johnson instead becomes "Cobra", an adventurer who explores space with his android partner Lady Armaroid. Cobra wields the Psychogun, a cybernetic arm-laser gun, to fight monsters and the Pirate Guild, an organized crime syndicate of pirates. After a battle with the Guild, Cobra allows its leader Captain Vaiken to escape. Vaiken distributes Cobra's picture to other pirates, making him a wanted man. After the dream ends, Johnson describes the fantasy to an attendant, who is surprised because Johnson's dream should not have any reference to pirates or to Cobra.

On his way back home, Johnson crashes into a speeding car whose driver looks like Captain Vaiken. When Johnson mentions the resemblance, the driver reveals himself as Vaiken. He asks Johnson about "Cobra" and threatens to kill Johnson if he does not answer. Johnson unconsciously lifts his arm and a ray shoots out of his hand, killing Vaiken. The shot explodes Johnson's arm, revealing the Psychogun embedded in it.

Johnson rushes home, where Ben notices the weapon on his arm. Johnson then realizes that he remembers nothing from before the last three years. After looking into a mirror, he finds a knob and turns it to reveal a secret room. There, he finds the revolver which he used in his dream. At that moment, armed intruders break into the house and address him as "Cobra". A battle ensues, and Ben's robot shell breaks to reveal Lady Armaroid, with whom Johnson kills the intruders.

Johnson starts to remember his previous existence as Cobra. Hunted by the Pirate Guild for meddling in their criminal enterprises and tired of life on the run, Cobra surgically altered his face and had his memories erased. Lady Armaroid tells Cobra that the Trip Movie has triggered his subconscious to regain access to the memories of his former life. Cobra and Lady Armadroid resume their adventurous life together.

== Main characters ==
- Cobra (コブラ, Kobura): the title character, whose left arm has been replaced by a mind-controlled energy cannon.
- Lady Armaroid (アーマロイド・レディ, Āmaroido Redi; originally "Armaroid Lady"): a female android, Cobra's partner most of the time.
- The Royal sisters: Jane Royal (ジェーン・ロイヤル, Jēn Roiyaru), Catherine Royal (キャサリン・ロイヤル, Kyasarin Roiyaru), Dominique Royal (ドミニク・ロイヤル, Dominiku Roiyaru).
- Crystal Bowie (クリスタル・ボーイ, Kurisutaru Bōi): a recurring enemy of Cobra, whose body is entirely composed of a special, very resistant glass (hence his name).
- Sandra (サンドラ, Sandora): first serves as the leader of the local branch of the Pirate Guild on her home planet.
- Lord Salamander (ロード・サラマンダー, Rōdo Saramandā) Cobra's archenemy, the ultimate leader of the Pirate Guild with powerful psychic powers, revealed after his death to be an incarnation of Adolf Hitler's soul.

== Production ==
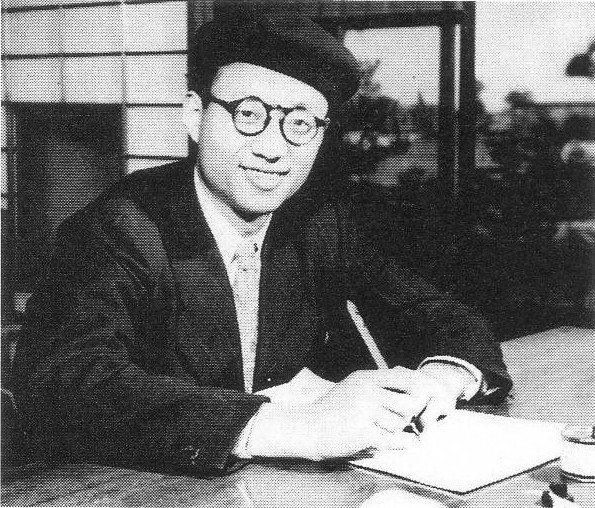
Osamu Tezuka (pictured) was the main influence for the series, inspiring Terasawa's storytelling, panel layout, and narrative pacing.

Cobra is Buichi Terasawa's debut manga series. Previously he had written and illustrated between twenty and thirty science-fiction shōjo (targeted towards girls) short stories for manga contests held by manga magazines, with one of them earning an honorable mention. Terasawa created Cobra by combining the Spaghetti Western subgenre and Japanese stories featuring a "wandering swordsman".

Terasawa wanted to create a hero who would be able to carry a concealed weapon and then the Psychogun was created before the titular character. His concept of a hero has been greatly influenced by "spaghetti westerns with a James Bond-type spin to them." Also from Bond series came the concept of several women who circulate around Cobra. For Cobra, he also drew inspiration from the French actor Jean-Paul Belmondo and his "phlegmatic style", specifically from his characters on Breathless (1960) and That Man from Rio (1964). The then rising actresses Dominique Sanda and Catherine Deneuve also inspired the names of the Royal Sisters. One of Cobra's main enemies, Crystal Bowie, was named as a tribute to English musician David Bowie.

In general, Terasawa has been influenced by films, including Star Trek, René Laloux's animations, the James Bond film series, Akira Kurosawa's films, and Disney films prior to The Little Mermaid (1989). For example, Jane Fonda's performance in the cult science-fiction film Barbarella (1968) served as a direct model for his character Jane, whose hairstyle was also inspired by Princess Aurora's in the Disney animated film Sleeping Beauty (1959). For his storytelling, panel layout, and narrative pacing in general, he draws influence from Osamu Tezuka, a manga artist who mentored him. Terasawa declared, "Without him, ... Cobra would never have existed.

== Media ==
=== Manga ===
Written and illustrated by Buichi Terasawa, Cobra was first published in 1977 in Shueisha's shōnen manga magazine Weekly Shōnen Jump as a one-shot edition. It was later serialized for six years, running from the November 6, 1978, issue to the November 12, 1984, issue of Weekly Shōnen Jump, and released under the magazine's Jump Comics line in eighteen tankōbon volumes between August 15, 1979, and August 15, 1985. Cobra was re-published from February 10, 1988, to November 10, 1998, in a ten-volume aizōban edition under Jump Comics Deluxe entitled Space Adventure Cobra.

The manga series was only partially released in the United States by Viz Communications in 1990 in a series of twelve books. This English-language publication covered the origin story and the Royal Sisters' saga, with dialogue adapted by the American comic book writer Marv Wolfman and published under Viz Communications' Viz Select Comics line. In 2015, Creek & River released the complete full-color CG sequel series alongside full-color CG remakes of select story arcs from the original manga in the US in a 15-volume full-color Kindle edition. The complete manga was printed in several other countries. In France, the manga was first published by Dynamic Visions, and later reprinted by Taifu Comics. Its first volume was released in the 1990s Brazil by Dealer, being one of the first manga to be published in the country. The manga was also published in Italy by Play Press, in Taiwan by Tong Li, in Hong Kong by Culturecom, and in Thailand by Vibulkij.

Shueisha released Cobra in kanzenban form with the title Space Adventure Cobra: Handy Edition—which included volumes one through ten—from October 19, 2001, to February 4, 2002. Shueisha later created three kanzenban magazine series based on the Cobra manga under their Shueisha Jump Remix line. Irezumi no Onna Hen, (Note: 刺青の女編), which spanned two volumes, was published on October 7 and 21, 2002; Rugball Hen (Note: ラグ・ボール編, Ragubōru-hen), which spanned two volumes, was published on November 2 and 18, 2002; and Shido no Megami Hen (Note: シドの女神編), which spanned three volumes, was published from June 9 to July 7, 2003. Media Factory also published Cobra in a kanzenban edition; it was simply called Cobra Kanzenban (Note: COBRA完全版), and spawned twelve volumes released between August 23, 2005, and June 23, 2006. Cobra was also sold as an e-book, Space Adventure Cobra: Galaxy Knights (Note: Space Adventure Cobra〜ギャラクシーナイツ, Supēsu Adobenchā Kobura Gyarakushī Naitsu) for a limited time.

==== Sequels and spin-offs ====
The seinen manga magazine Super Jump published several Cobra sequel or spin-off series. The first was titled Cobra: Legend of the Holy Knight, (Note: コブラ〜聖なる騎士伝説, Kobura Seinaru Kishi Densetsu) which was serialized in 1986 in a special issue of Weekly Shōnen Jump. It was then published in a single tankōbon by Shueisha in 1988 under the magazine's Jump Comics Deluxe line. Space Adventure Cobra: The Psychogun, (Note: SPACE ADVENTURE COBRA〜ザ・サイコガン, Supēsu Adobenchā Kobura Za Saikogan) a fully colored "computer graphics" manga, was serialized in Super Jump in 1995. A "computer graphics" sequel called Space Adventure Cobra: Magic Doll (Note: Space Adventure Cobra〜マジックドール, Supēsu Adobenchā Kobura Majikku Dōru) was serialized in Super Jump from 2000 to 2002. Along with several other series serialized in Super Jump, they were published from 1995 to 2002 in Jump Comics Deluxe under the title Space Adventure Cobra.

Space Adventure Cobra: Magic Doll was re-serialized in the Monthly Comic Flapper magazine by Media Factory, and was published under its MF Comics line as Cobra the Space Pirate: Magic Doll Part 1 (Note: COBRA THE SPACE PIRATE マジックドール 前編, Kobura Za Supēsu Pairētsu Majikku Dōru Zenpen) and Cobra the Space Pirate: Magic Doll Part 2 (Note: COBRA THE SPACE PIRATE マジックドール 後編, Kobura Za Supēsu Pairētsu Majikku Dōru Kōhen) on February 23 and September 22, 2006, respectively. In addition, Media Factory published six Cobra one-shots; the first one, Cobra the Space Pirate: Kokuryū Ō (Note: Cobra the Space Pirate 黒龍王, Kobura Za Supēsu Pairētsu Kokuryū Ō), on March 23, 2006, and the last one, Cobra the Space Pirate: Time Drive (Note: COBRA THE SPACE PIRATE タイム・ドライブ, Kobura Za Supēsu Pairētsu Taimou Doraibu), on April 23, 2009, all of which were also under MF Comics. To celebrate the series' 30th anniversary, sixteen manga were reprinted and released by Media Factory; on May 23, 2008, Cobra Fukkatsu (Note: コブラ復活, Kobura Fukkatsu) and Irezumi no Sanshimai (Note: イレズミの三姉妹) were released, and Magic Doll concluded it, with its release on July 7, 2009. From October 25, 2014, to June 13, 2015, Media Factory is republishing Cobra the Space Pirate through its MFR Series.

Thanks to requests, Terasawa announced in February 2016 he would create a new saga for Cobra. He aimed to deal with the unsolved plot of the strange resemblance of two female characters—Dominique and Secret. More than three years later, in November 2019, Comic Flapper magazine's official Twitter account announced the release of Cobra: Over the Rainbow. A sequel to the original manga, it started to be released digitally on November 19 through Kadokawa Corporation's Comic Walker and Niconico Manga websites under the Comic Hu label. The sixth and latest chapter was published on April 19, 2020, before Terasawa's death in September 2023.

=== Anime ===
==== Film ====
Tokyo Movie Shinsha adapted the manga into a film titled Space Adventure Cobra, which was released on July 23, 1982, in Japan. It was directed by Osamu Dezaki, with screenplay by Terasawa and Haruya Yamazaki, and retold the Cobra involvement with the Royal Sisters, and his fight against Crystal Bowie. Manga Entertainment released the film in British theaters in 1995. An American dub was created by Carl Macek's Streamline Pictures, and was released in American theaters also in 1995, by Tara, and was later distributed by Urban Vision on VHS format in 1998. The film was later released on DVD in the Australasian region by Madman Entertainment in 2007, in the UK by Manga Entertainment in 2008, and on DVD (in 2012) and Blu-ray (in 2015) by Discotek Media in the US.

==== Television series ====
===== Space Cobra =====
Cobra was adapted into an anime series titled Space Cobra directed by Dezaki and Yoshio Takeuchi that aired on Fuji Television between October 7, 1982, and May 19, 1983. The scenario writers were Haruya Yamazaki, Kosuke Miki, and Kenji Terada. Terasawa himself participated in weekly meetings to discuss the screenplays, giving his suggestions to the writers to fix what was wrong or rewriting the screenplay himself. The episodes were released in eight DVDs and a DVD box set on October 25, 2000, by Digital Site in Japan. The series was released in North America by Nozomi Entertainment in two parts; the first was released on March 4, 2014, and the second one on May 6 of that same year. In November 2015, the series was added to the Crunchyroll streaming service to be broadcast in the United States and Canada with English substitles. In June 2020, Discotek Media licensed the anime series and released it on Blu-ray on September 29, including the English pilot episode and a new experimental English dub for the first two episodes.

===== Cobra the Animation =====
Cobra was adapted into two OVAs and a television series that were created by Guild Project and animated by Magic Bus under the Cobra the Animation line for the series' 30th anniversary. The first of the series was The Psychogun, which was released direct-to-DVD between August 29, 2008, and February 27, 2009. It was written, storyboarded, and directed by Terasawa. Its sequel OVA, Time Drive, was released between April 24, 2009, and June 26, 2009. It was co-directed by Terasawa and Kenichi Maejima, and co-written by Terasawa and Mitsuyo Suenaga. Both OVA series were later released in Blu-ray box set on February 19, 2010. The anime television series Rokunin no Yūshi, directed by Keizo Shimizu, aired on BS 11 between January 2, 2010, and March 27, 2010. Crunchyroll streamed the first OVA series between December 18, 2009, to on January 8, 2010. The two episodes of Time Drive were uploaded on January 1, 2008, and Rokunin no Yūshi was simulcasted as it aired in Japan. In April 2016 during the Anime Boston the anime television and the OVAs were licensed by Sentai Filmworks to be released in North America through digital outlets and in the home video market.

=== Music ===
The soundtrack of the film was composed by Osamu Shōji. It used a single opening theme and a single ending theme, and its lyrics were written by Tetsuya Chiaki and composed by Saburo Suzuki. "Daydream Romance" (Note: デイドリーム・ロマンス, Deidorīmu Romansu) by Shigeru Matsuzaki was used as the opening music and "Stay" (Note: ステイ, Sutei) by Eve was used at the end. The subsequent anime's music was scored by Kentarō Haneda. The lyrics for "Cobra" and "Secret Desire" (Note: シークレット・デザイアー, Shīkuretto Dezaiā), the opening and the ending themes respectively, were written by Kayoko Fuyumori and composed by Yuji Ohno; both were sung by Yoko Maeno. The anime's music was compiled into two albums; Space Cobra: Original Soundtrack and Space Cobra: Complete Soundtrack were released by Nippon Columbia on September 25, 2003, and April 21, 2004, respectively.

The musical score for Cobra the Animation was composed by Yoshihiro Ike. The opening theme from The Psychogun is "Kizudarake no Yume" (Note: 傷だらけの夢) by Yoko Takahashi and it ending theme is "Wanderer" by Shigeru Matsuzaki. Both were released as singles on August 27, 2008, by Nippon Columbia. The second OVA used "Time Drive" by Sasja Antheunis as its opening theme and "Kimi ga bi Waraunara" (Note: 君が微笑うなら) by Shigeru Matsuzaki as its closing theme. "Cobra the Space Pirate" by Sasja Antheunis and "Kimi no Uta" (Note: 君の歌) respectively were used as opening theme and closing theme for Rokunin no Yūshi. On March 24, 2010, both were released as singles by Nippon Columbia. A soundtrack containing music from both OVAs and a compilation of music from the anime series were released on January 20, 2010, and April 14, 2010, respectively. Cobra Song Collection, which encompassed music from the soundtracks of the film, two OVAs and two anime series was released on March 31, 2010, by Nippon Columbia.

=== Video games ===
In 1982, Popy Electronics created the hand-held games Space Cobra Professional and Space Cobra the Psychogun. It was followed by Cobra: Kokuryū Ō no Densetsu, released in 1989 for the PC Engine, and Cobra 2: Densetsu no Otoko, released for the PC Engine in 1990, which was released in North America and Europe for the Sega CD as The Space Adventure – Cobra: The Legendary Bandit.

=== French animated series ===
On June 13, 2025, at the Annecy International Animation Film Festival in France, French production and distribution company Mangouste Anim announced that it had acquired the rights to produce a new Cobra animated series. Although a specific date was not disclosed, the company stated that "Cobra will return to the screen".

=== Other media ===
The Cobra manga has become the basis of two artbooks; the first focusing on the female characters of the series was released as Cobra Girls (Note: COBRA GIRLS, Kobura Gāruzu) on February 1, 1988. Concept designs of the manga were added to a Cobra artbook titled Cobra Wonder: Concept Design Arts of Cobra World, which was released on July 17, 1997, and included two Cobra's side stories—Bara (Note: バラ; lit. "Rose") and Mahō no Fune (Note: 魔法の船; lit. "Ship of Magic")—first published in Super Jump in 1988. Popy and Bandai included Cobra's ground vehicle, the Psychoroid, in the Japanese Machine Robo toyline, where it gained the ability to transform into a robot. Japan later exported this idea to the United States as part of the Super Gobots toyline under the name "Psycho", designed by Murakami Katsushi. In Japan, action figures, T-shirts, kewpie dolls, Cobra's Psychogun and Crystal Bowie's claw replicas, stamps, and limited-edition whiskey bottles were sold as merchandise for the series.

== Reception ==
=== Critical response ===
The English version of Cobra was named as one of "The Top 25 Translated-To-English Manga of All Time" by Wizard magazine. Ivevei Upatkoon of EX online magazine praised it as a "rich fantasy" that was unmatched by any other. She said the main character took "after James Bond, albeit somewhat on the silly side, and the costumes and bizarre worlds are but a shade shy of plagiarizing Barbarella". She was impressed that the series "is surprisingly devoid of the sexual innuendo and exploitation that anime fans have come to associate with decorative female characters"; it avoids the stereotypical, beautiful women, and instead creates its own "extreme" world. Upatkoon also said that modern readers might find the manga dated and would be discouraged from reading it, despite the improvement in artistic quality as the series progresses. Writing for Anime News Network (ANN), Jason Thompson described Cobra as "a significant piece of manga history". Thompson wrote that the women of the series have a "realistic physique and not some moe jailbait or grotesque bakunyu explosion". Thompson deemed Cobra as a parody of both Western action heroes and Star Wars and 1970s shōjo science fiction and its concept of beauty".

Pedro Cortes from Japanator affirmed, "Space Adventure Cobra is interesting in that it takes a shard of an idea from a classic and then spins it out into its own epic." Cortes praised its "charming" designs, but criticized the main character's lack of development as "the only negative thing." He added, "There isn't a ton of depth, but the show doesn't pretend to be anything but a fun, sci-fi romp around the galaxy." ANN's Theron Martin praised its "surprisingly solid" art "for a series of its era" and affirmed, "it does stand up well as high-spirited, fun-loving action fare with occasional darker overtones." Chris Beveridge of The Fandom Post said, "It's simple but full of adventure, interesting characters and locations and a sense of fun that definitely makes it work in a very good way" and has "a solid visual design." Washington, in a review for Otaku USA, commended it for being "entertaining overall" and having "an overall fun vibe" because of its "smooth" art; he, however, criticized what he called "serious misogynistic tendencies." The Encyclopedia of Science Fiction notes that "The show's adult sensibilities – featuring gunplay, scantily-clad femmes fatales, and psychedelic visuals – pushed the boundaries of 1980s Japanese sf", influenced by Western traditions, and in turn, influencing many later works, both in Japan and in the West.

Chris Beveridge from Mania.com praised the Cobra the Animation anime series and its visual design, compared to those of The Psychogun, but said it is not for those who are unaware of the original series. He said the anime has "a healthy dose of action, the kind of sexuality that's a trademark of the series ... as well as a good bit of silly fun". In the second episode review, Beveridge said it "seems to be following much the same kind of pace and structure" as the OVAs. Its animation was compared to Darkside Blues; ANN's Erin Finnegan described it as "gritty" animation, but that from episode five, the animation quality looks more modern and much less gritty. Beveridge said the anime's idea is simple, but added it is "also not a show you see often since it doesn't center around teenagers, schools or the harem concept". He said it is not "a great show", but that "it gives us something different than the usual"—the reason it is "enjoyable".

=== Popularity and legacy ===
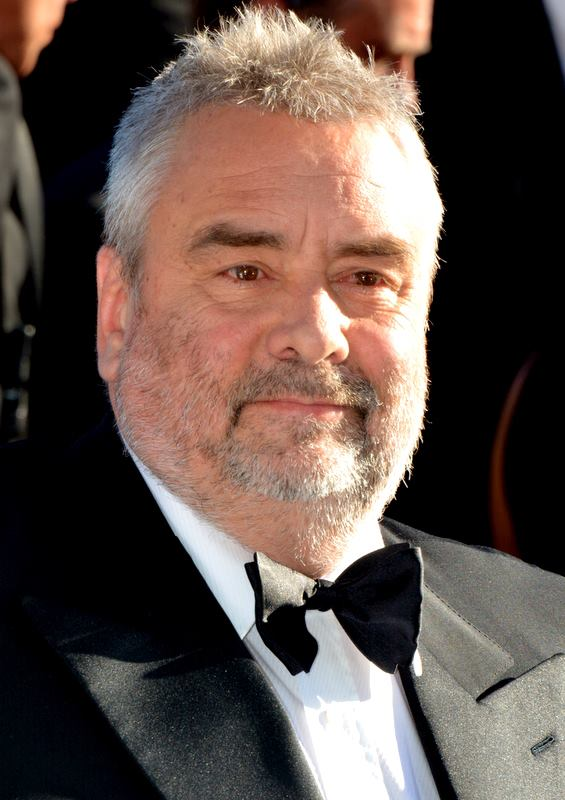
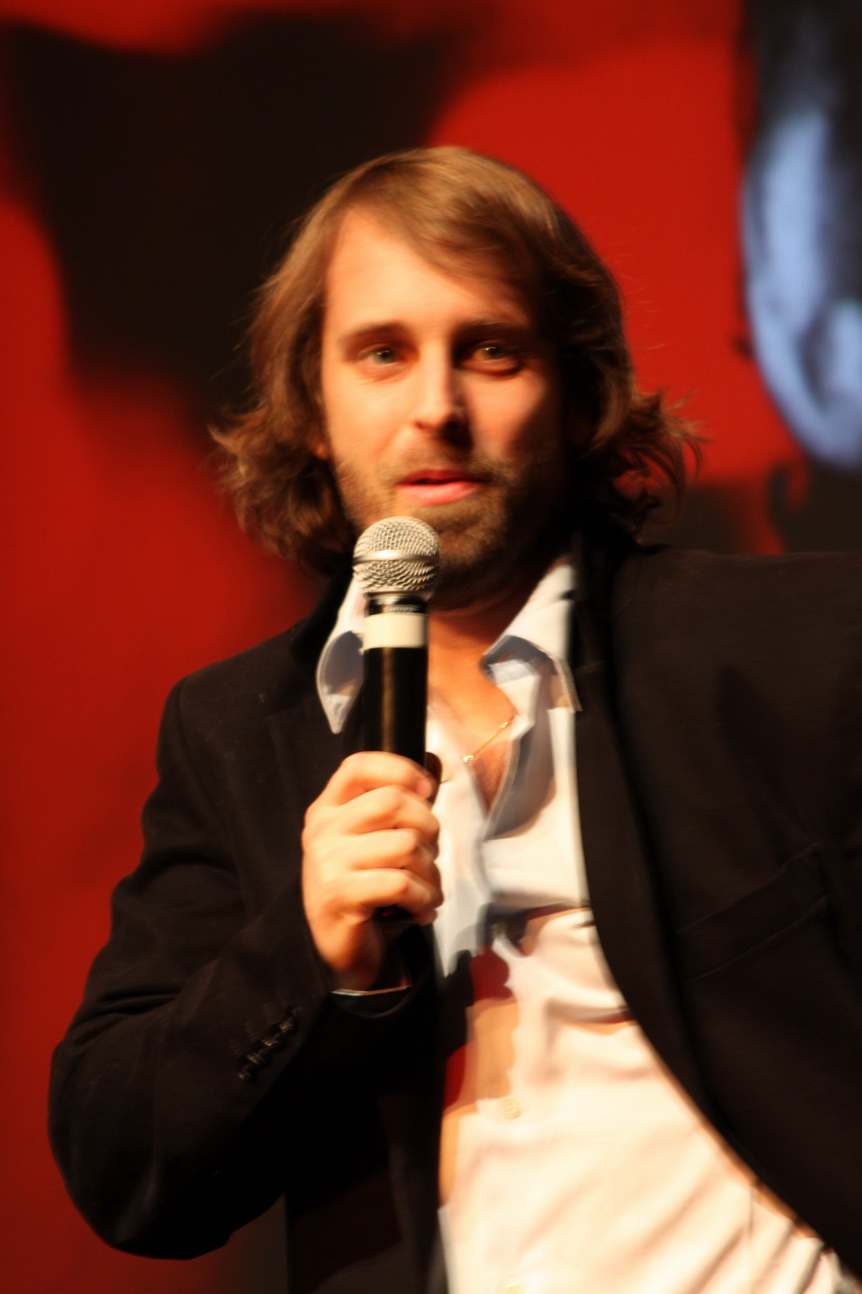
Cobra was very popular in France in the 1980s; even French directors Luc Besson (left) and Alexandre Aja (right) are fans of the series. Aja declared a Cobra film adaptation was his "dream project".

Cobra made Terasawa, who at the time was 22 and was little known, famous. Approximately 50 million copies of Cobra have been sold, making it one of Weekly Shōnen Jump's best-selling manga series of all time. The anime television series was a major success in France in the 1980s. Le Monde's Frédéric Potet said it "marked a whole generation of young viewers", and Joel Metreau of 20 minutes asserted it gained a cult following. Alexandre Aja and Luc Besson are among the French filmmakers that are fans of the series.

Cobra has been influential on anime, manga, and video game creators. According to French scholar Marie Pruvost-Delaspre, its humorous style and sexual innuendos influenced manga City Hunter (1985), and Shinichirō Watanabe's anime Cowboy Bebop (1998) and Space Dandy (2014) owe their nostalgic appearance and the ironic tone, respectively, to Cobra. Manga author Kentaro Miura was influenced by Cobra's Psychogun on creating a prosthetic hand for Guts, the protagonist of Berserk (1989). Cobra's "provoking look", ironic style and capacity of changing from a little smile to a serious face also inspired video game designer Hideki Kamiya to create the character of Dante from the Devil May Cry series.

Thirty years after the original manga's publication, the OVA adaptation Cobra the Animation has been well received by fans; it was among the best-selling anime for two weeks, and the sixth volume of the anime series was one of the best-selling DVDs for one week.

==== Proposed live-action film ====
In 2008, Buichi Terasawa said he received a Hollywood offer to purchase the rights to a live-action film adaptation of the series. He stated it was "off-the-record", and that if it happened it would be partly standalone and separate from his original manga. However, in 2010, Alexandre Aja announced he had purchased its rights, and that he planned to direct a live-action film adaptation of Cobra. Aja was inspired to create this film adaptation because the original manga was one of his childhood favorites. Aja said he wanted to create a "tent pole-sized live action franchise".

In 2011, Aja wrote a script with Gregory Levasseur, and production was held by Aton Soumache and Dimitri Rassom under Onyx Films and Studio 37 with a budget of more than $100 million. Later, a teaser poster depicting promotional concept art for Cobra: The Space Pirate, along with a release date scheduled for mid-2013, was unveiled. In September 2013, however, Aja admitted that making the film will be "very hard" since "to do a new kind of Star Wars, [is] expensive" though he stated "we are trying everything, we will make it." In July 2014, Aja revealed it was estimated that the project would require a budget of over $150 million and that he was seeking to have an A-list actor to help attract a funder. One of his main difficulties, Aja said in 2015, was to decide who would star the film: "When I think 'who the heck is going to play that Cobra?', I become unable to move forward."

In a June 2016 interview, Aja said he did not abandon it and that "The project is well advanced". Working with the Orange Studio and a group of twenty concept artists, Aja was able "to develop an absolutely huge universe in visual research". One of the drawbacks that made him slow the process was the release of Guardians of the Galaxy in 2014, because Aja had to change several aspects of Cobra to differentiate it. In June 2017, he revealed the script was ready, but commented that another drawback is the big budget required for the film, which finds no funders in the US because the franchise is relatively unknown there. In April 2018, Aja announced the interruption of the film production and revealed it was in preproduction at Lionsgate until a regime change occurred; the company's new staff considered the film budget (US$130 million) to be high and the release of Star Wars: The Force Awakens was also a factor on the cancellation.

==== Proposed animated series ====
In 2016, Monaco-based Shibuya Productions announced that it would adapt the Rugball arc of the series into an "original animated series" called Cobra: Return of Joe Gillian. In collaboration with Terasawa's A-Girl Rights, the series was to be directed by Hervé Trouillet, produced by Cédric Biscay and Rinko Itoh, and written by Trouillet and Biscay. The announcement of the series was made through a promotional teaser released on February 27, 2016. The arc choice was based on the fact that it is a favorite of Cobra fans and it aimed to incorporate classic characters and elements of the Cobra universe. However, they hoped to attract more people for economic reasons; as such, it was to have a new story and a modern style of animation. The target audience of the series was primarily adolescents over 12 years old, and it was slated to premiere in 2018. However, the project was not launched that year, and there has been no further news since then.

== Notes ==
Japanese
