= Buichi Terasawa =

Japanese manga artist (1955–2023)

- 寺沢武一
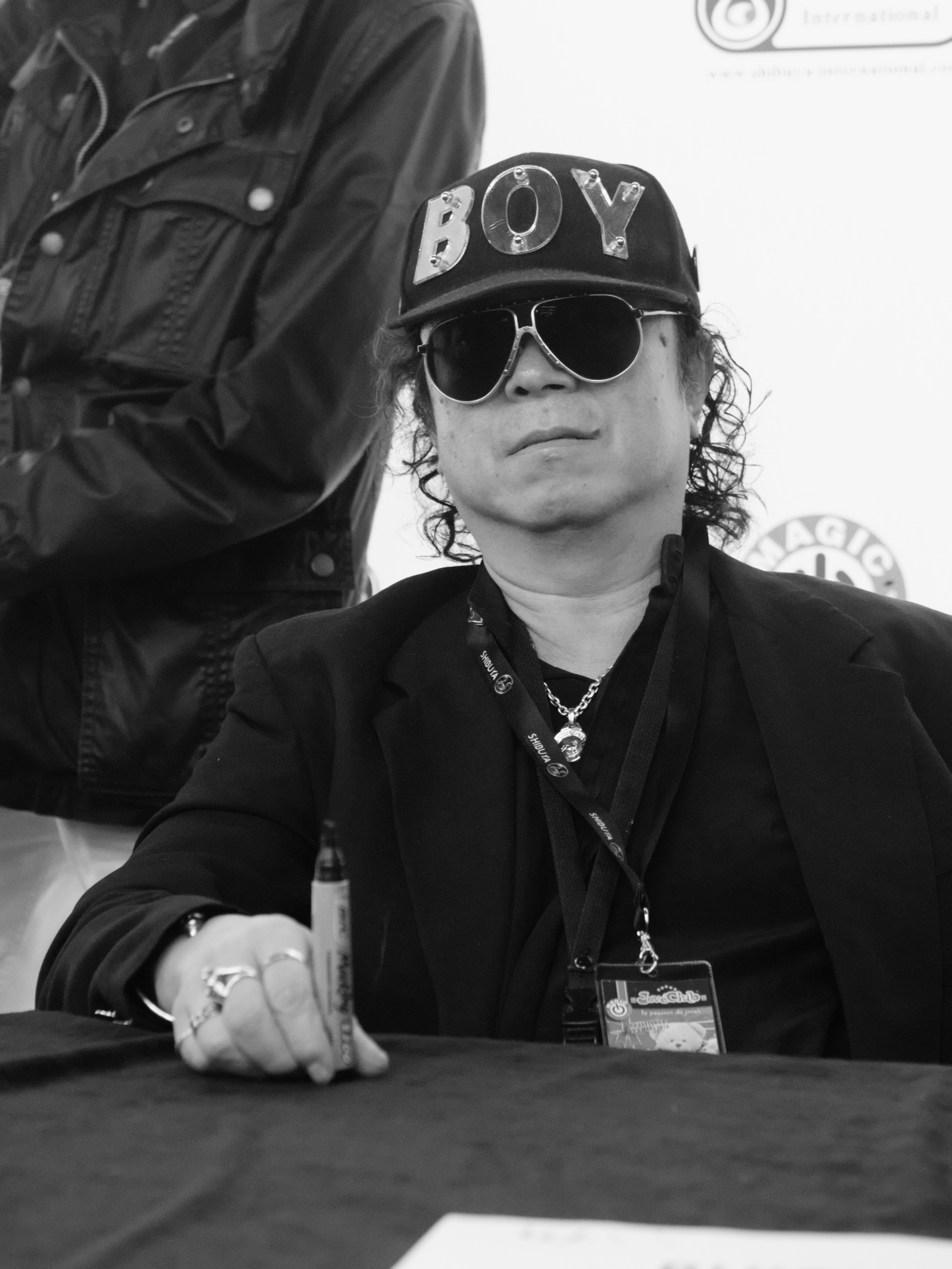
- Born: Takeichi Terasawa; March 30, 1955; Asahikawa, Hokkaido, Japan
- Died: September 8, 2023 (aged 68)
- Occupation: Manga artist
- Writing career
- Years active: 1976-2020
- Notable works: Cobra (manga); Goku Midnight Eye

Buichi Terasawa (Japanese: 寺沢 武一, Hepburn: Terasawa Buichi; March 30, 1955 – September 8, 2023) was a Japanese manga artist. His most famous works include Goku Midnight Eye and Cobra.

== Early life and career ==
Terasawa was born on March 30, 1955, in Asahikawa, Hokkaido. In the early days of his career, while still unknown, he contributed comics to a magazine that won him a prize. This event led him deeper into the world of comics.

In 1976 he moved to Tokyo and began to study under renowned Japanese manga artist, Osamu Tezuka. During the period he worked with the Manga Department of Tezuka Productions, his illustration work entitled "Mother Earth, Turn Green Again" was awarded the Tezuka Award. In 1977, he began drawing for Weekly Shōnen Jump, a popular Japanese manga magazine.

From around the beginning of the 1980s, he began to see the personal computer as a tool for creative purposes. In 1985, he kicked off an eight-color comic book series called BAT. In the ensuing years, in parallel with advances in the personal computer, he created TAKERU (1992), the world's first computer graphics comic book series.

Next came Cobra, Bat and Gundragon Sigma (in this latter series, only the main character is drawn by hand) and several other works.

His works include original works, scenarios and works he has directed. Representative works include a CD-ROM format work for use with a PC, COBRA II: A Man of Legend and original animation videos such as GOKU, GOKU II, Raven Tengu Kabuto and others.

Buichi Terasawa's works are translated and published in more than ten countries and are featured in comics and animation-related gatherings and exhibitions around the world.

Whilst in Japan promoting The Fifth Element, Luc Besson met with Terasawa to discuss the current state of sci-fi. Besson is reputedly a fan of Terasawa's work, partially due to the enormous popularity of Space Cobra in France.

== Illness and death ==
Terasawa was diagnosed with a malignant brain tumor in 1998, and despite surgery and chemotherapy, he relapsed and after surgery was left paralysed on the left side of his body. Terasawa died from a heart attack on September 8, 2023, at the age of 68.
