= List of series run in Shōnen Jump+ =

Shōnen Jump+, an online manga magazine operated by Shueisha, has featured numerous series since its launch in 2014. The list, organized by decade and year of each series' first publication, will list each series run on the platform, along with the author of each series and the series' finishing date if applicable.

== 2010s ==
=== 2014 ===
Manga	First Chapter	Final Chapter	Manga artist		
Manga	Éldlive (エルドライブ)	September 22, 2014 (Note: transferred from Jump Live)	Manga artist	November 5, 2018	Akira Amano
EXP:0	September 22, 2014	July 16, 2015	Satsuki Uehara		
Hetalia World Stars (ヘタリア World☆Stars)	September 22, 2014	April 23, 2026	Hidekaz Himaruya		
Honnori! Don Patch (ほんのり!どんぱっち)	September 22, 2014	August 3, 2015	Yoshio Sawai		
Iroha ni Hotoke! (いろはにほとけ！)	September 22, 2014	December 27, 2014	Wataru Onoda		
iShōjo+ (ｉ・ショウジョ＋)	September 22, 2014	April 25, 2017	Toshinori Takayama		
The Right Way to Make Jump! (ジャンプの正しい作り方！, Jump no Tadashii Tsukurikata!)	September 22, 2014	May 25, 2015	Takeshi Sakurai		
Kamisama, Kisama wo Koroshitai. (神様、キサマを殺したい。)	September 22, 2014	present	Inusuke Matsuhashi		
Keppare Matsubara-san! (ケッパレ 松原さん!)	September 22, 2014	November 12, 2022	Shiroyagi		
Kiss × Death	September 22, 2014	April 5, 2018	Yasuhiro Kanō		
Let's! Haikyū!? (れっつ!ハイキュー!?)	September 22, 2014	November 12, 2022	Retsu		
Makai kara Kita Maid-san (魔界から来たメイドさん)	September 22, 2014	November 11, 2015	Chima Sakuraebi		
Mofumofu (もふもふ)	September 22, 2014	December 28, 2014	Hayato Yahagi		
Monban Kaeru wa Shagamitai (門番カエルはしゃがみたい)	September 22, 2014	February 6, 2015	Retsu		
My Animal (マイアニマル)	September 22, 2014	June 16, 2015	Kenta Tsuchida		
Navirinth (ナビリンス)	September 22, 2014	October 15, 2014	Yūya Ogura		
Nekota Biyori (猫田びより)	September 22, 2014	present	Kuraku		
Pochi Kuro (ポチクロ)	September 22, 2014	July 31, 2015	Naoya Matsumoto		
Seiyū Mashimashi Club (声優ましまし倶楽部)	September 22, 2014	February 21, 2016	Hibari Meguro, Jin Kobayashi		
Tōhō Momotarō, Zen Part Boshū (当方桃太郎、全パート募集)	September 22, 2014	July 31, 2015	Honemaru Mikami		
Tonkatsu DJ Agetarō (とんかつDJアゲ太郎)	September 22, 2014	March 23, 2017	yipiao, Yūjirō Koyama		
Yukari-chan (ゆかりちゃん)	September 22, 2014	March 8, 2015	Masaya Tsunamoto, Yū		
Yukimi Daifuku (雪美DAIFUKU)	September 22, 2014	October 6, 2014	Daiki Ihara		
Killer Heaven (キラーヘブン)	September 24, 2014	January 28, 2015	Joe Takahashi		
Ōnishi Yū Boku Hi Seiden (大西遊 墨飛正伝)	September 25, 2014	June 11, 2015	Hi Sumi		
Karadasagashi (カラダ探し)	September 26, 2014	December 8, 2017	Welzard, Katsutoshi Murase		
Kuhiko-san (クヒコさん)	October 6, 2014	October 13, 2014	Hayato Yahagi, Kentarō Hidano		
Jingi Naki Yoshida-ke (仁義なき吉田家)	October 10, 2014	January 21, 2015	Osamu Edogawa		
Yagiza no Yūjin (山羊座の友人)	October 18, 2014	April 25, 2015	Otsuichi, Masaru Miyokawa		
World 4u_	November 21, 2014 (Note: relaunched from irregular serialization in other Jump magazines)	March 8, 2015	Tatsuma Eijiri		
Magical Pâtissière Kosaki-chan!! (マジカルパティシエ小咲ちゃん!!)	December 1, 2014	September 22, 2016	Taishi Tsutsui		
The Maō-sama (THE魔王さま)	December 16, 2014	June 2, 2015	Makochin Ishihara		
5 Miǎo tónghuà (5秒童話) (Note: Japanese translation of the manhua run in AC.QQ)	December 18, 2014	March 12, 2015	Di Nian Miao		
Wareware wa Uchūjin na no da!! (ワレワレは宇宙人なのだ!!)	December 20, 2014	August 4, 2015	Tatsurō Sakaguchi		

=== 2015 ===
Manga	First Chapter	Final Chapter	Manga artist		
Manga	N to S wa Kuttsukanai (NとSはくっつかない)	January 7, 2015	Manga artist	January 14, 2015	Kyōhei Miyajima
Unchi Nekonchi (うんちねこんち)	January 20, 2015	January 27, 2015	Ryō Nakama		
Kuroko no Basket Replace Plus (黒子のバスケ Replace PLUS)	January 27, 2015	April 24, 2018	Sawako Hirabayashi, Ichirō Takahashi		
Boys Over Flowers Season 2 (花のち晴れ〜花男 Next Season〜, Hana Nochi Hare: HanaDan Next Season)	February 15, 2015	December 22, 2019	Yōko Yamio		
Onsengai no Medusa (温泉街のメデューサ)	February 16, 2015	March 14, 2016	Taira Wadachi		
Shokugeki no Sōma: L'étoile (食戟のソーマ L'etoile-エトワール-)	February 20, 2015	June 21, 2019	Michiko Itō, Taiki Asatoki		
Love Dester (ラブデスター)	February 25, 2015	April 25, 2018	Kenji Sakaki		
Toki wo Saiteigen Kakeru Rokuden-shi (時を最低限かける六田氏)	March 22, 2015	April 12, 2015	Tatsuya Suganuma		
Jikan no Shihaisha (時間の支配者) (Note: Japanese translation of the manhua run in Manhua King)	March 26, 2015	February 15, 2018	Jea Pon		
Mahō Shōjo Kobutorin (魔法少女コブトリン)	May 1, 2015	May 2, 2015	Kimuchi Yokoyama		
Ikimono Seitai Kansatsu Variety Bokura wa Minna (いきもの生態観察バラエティー ぼくらはみんな)	May 4, 2015	May 5, 2015	Daijiro Nonōe		
Cherry Blossom Sakura Naoki (CHERRY TEACHER佐倉直生)	June 14, 2015 (Note: transferred from Jump SQ.19)	September 11, 2016	Kazumi Tachibana		
Gunjō no Magmell (群青のマグメル) (Note: Japanese translation of the manhua run in Fan Manhua)	June 19, 2015	present	Di Nian Miao		
Tenjin (天神-TENJIN-) (Note: Part 1: June 23, 2015–November 25, 2015; Part 2: December 1, 2015–October 16, 2016; Eagle's Nest: February 8, 2017–May 29, 2019)	June 23, 2015	May 29, 2019	Yōichi Komori, Muneaki Taoka, Tsubasa Sugie		
Kami Eshi Nisshi (神えしにっし)	July 2, 2015	July 8, 2016	Mika Sakurano		
Full Charge!! Kaden-chan (フルチャージ!! 家電ちゃん)	July 4, 2015	December 9, 2017	Konchiki		
Ano Ko wa Yariman (あの娘はヤリマン)	July 8, 2015	June 1, 2016	Otsuzō Kitauchi		
Soul Catcher(S)	July 24, 2015 (Note: transferred from Jump Next!)	February 14, 2016	Hideo Shinkai		
Dokusaisha Zeke (独裁者ジーク)	August 8, 2015	May 7, 2016	Kei Inayoshi, Saimaru Bamyūda		
Food Fighter Tabelu (フードファイタータベル)	September 5, 2015	April 21, 2018	Kyōsuke Usuta		
Ultra Battle Satellite	October 4, 2015 (Note: concluded from Weekly Shōnen Jump)	October 11, 2015	Yūsuke Utsumi		
The Emperor and I (エンペラーといっしょ, Emperor to Issho)	October 28, 2015	July 12, 2017	mato		
Accel Star (アクセルスター)	November 4, 2015	April 13, 2016	Hana		
Mozu no Sakebu Yoru (百舌の叫ぶ夜—MOZU—)	November 7, 2015	November 14, 2015	Suguru Hō, Osamu Kumo		
My Hero Academia: Smash!! (僕のヒーローアカデミアすまっしゅ!!, Boku no Hero Academia Smash!!)	November 9, 2015	November 6, 2017	Hirofumi Neda		
Dead or Animation (デッド・オア・アニメーション)	December 18, 2015	September 9, 2016	Yoshikazu Amami		
Luger Code 1951 (ルガーコード1951)	December 28, 2015	February 29, 2016	Haruto Haneki, Akira Akatsuki		

=== 2016 ===
Manga	First Chapter	Final Chapter	Manga artist		
Manga	Active Raid: Kidō Kyōshūshitsu Daihachigakari (アクティヴレイド-機動強襲室第八係-)	January 7, 2016	Manga artist	July 28, 2016	Kōhei Ueda
Tetsuwan Adam (鉄腕アダム)	February 16, 2016	March 13, 2018	Ryūkō Azuma		
Bye-Bye Jinrui (バイバイ人類)	February 28, 2016	November 3, 2017	Tsunezō Watanabe, Asami Hagiwara		
Cheer Danshi!! Go Breakers (チア男子!! -GO BREAKERS-)	April 5, 2016	November 8, 2016	Ryō Asai, Ken'ichi Kondō		
Tabekake Gospel Plan: Dear Succubus Sister (たべかけ福音計画 〜Dear Succubus Sister〜)	April 13, 2016	March 1, 2017	Yū Kadono		
Fire Punch (ファイアパンチ)	April 18, 2016	January 1, 2018	Tatsuki Fujimoto		
Reptoid (レプトイド)	April 29, 2016	June 17, 2016	Tsuyoshi		
World's End Harem (終末のハーレム, Shūmatsu no Harem) (Note: Part 1: May 8, 2016–June 21, 2020; After World: May 9, 2021–May 7, 2023)	May 8, 2016	May 7, 2023	LINK, Kotaro Shono		
Astra Lost in Space (彼方のアストラ, Kanata no Astra)	May 9, 2016	December 30, 2017	Kenta Shinohara		
Gunma Idol Shinwa Uma Seven (群馬アイドル神話 馬セブン)	July 11, 2016	September 21, 2016	Boomerang Pantsu Yarō		
Dare ga Kenia wo Koroshita ka? (誰が賢者を殺したか？)	July 21, 2016	August 17, 2017	Jōsuke Nanamoto, Neri Mikumo		
Akuma no Memumemu-chan (悪魔のメムメムちゃん)	July 26, 2016	April 20, 2021	Keitarō Yotsuya		
Family Game (ファミリーゲーム)	August 1, 2016	August 5, 2016	Di Nian Miao		
Sinners (SINNERS -罪魂使-) (Note: Japanese translation of the manhua run in Dragon Youth)	August 6, 2016	February 25, 2018	Yu Zi Gui, Sha Long Xiao		
Jumyō o Kaitotte Moratta. Ichinen ni Tsuki, Ichimanen de. (寿命を買い取ってもらった。一年につき、一万円で。)	August 10, 2016	October 25, 2017	Shōichi Taguchi		
Onimadara (オニマダラ)	September 23, 2016	March 24, 2017	Shūji Kurotani		
Machi Koro Match!+ (街コロマッチ！＋)	October 22, 2016	August 26, 2017	Masahiro Hirakata		
Ihara 20Days (伊原20days)	November 14, 2016	December 3, 2016	Daiki Ihara		
Makui no Rease (魔喰のリース)	November 30, 2016	December 27, 2017	Ai Odahara		
Ihara 20Days’ (伊原20days’)	December 4, 2016	December 23, 2016	Daiki Ihara		
Muttsuri Shinken (ムッツリ真拳)	December 9, 2016	June 2, 2017	Naoya Sugita		
Tōken Ranbu: Hanamaru (『刀剣乱舞-花丸-』)	December 10, 2016	April 4, 2019	Saru Hashino		
Dragon Ball: That Time I Got Reincarnated as Yamcha (ドラゴンボール外伝 転生したらヤムチャだった件, Dragon Ball Gaiden Tensei-shitara Yamcha Datta Ken)	December 12, 2016	August 14, 2017	dragongarow LEE		
My Hero Academia: Vigilantes (ヴィジランテ-僕のヒーローアカデミア ILLEGALS-, Vigilante -Boku no Hero Academia Illegals-)	December 15, 2016 (Note: relaunched from Jump GIGA)	May 28, 2022	Hideyuki Furuhashi, Betten Court		

=== 2017 ===
Manga	First Chapter	Final Chapter	Manga artist		
Manga	#Kamacho Inu wa Tsunagaritai (＃かまちょ犬はつながりたい)	January 23, 2017	Manga artist	January 29, 2017	Yuki Shioki
Aharen-san Is Indecipherable (阿波連さんははかれない, Aharen-san wa Hakarenai)	January 29, 2017	April 30, 2023	Asato Mizu		
Blue Flag (青のフラッグ, Ao no Flag)	February 1, 2017	April 8, 2020	KAITO		
Route End	February 11, 2017	February 9, 2019	Kaiji Nakagawa		
Macho Gourmet (マッチョグルメ)	February 14, 2017	May 9, 2017	Nariaki Narita		
Susume! Jump Heppoko Tanken-tai! (すすめ!ジャンプへっぽこ探検隊!)	February 16, 2017	present	Takeshi Sakurai		
Hinmin Chōjin Kanenashi-kun (貧民超人カネナシくん)	February 20, 2017	December 25, 2017	Pageratta		
Ore wa Suki nano wa Omae dake ka yo (俺を好きなのはお前だけかよ)	February 26, 2017	August 23, 2020	Rakuda, Yū Ijima		
Inochi wo Waketa Kimi to, Jinsei Saigo no Yume wo Miru (命を分けたきみと、人生最後の夢をみる)	March 2, 2017	September 14, 2017	Welzard, Yūya Ogura		
Shūkyoku Engage (終極エンゲージ)	March 12, 2017	April 15, 2018	Shunji Etō, Yoshiyuki Miwa		
Moto Jump Sakka ga Ikuji ni Sei wo Dashite Mita (元ジャンプ作家が育児に精を出してみた)	March 23, 2017	February 6, 2019	Rakuda, Yū Ijima		
Chikyū Ningen Terra-chan (地球人間テラちゃん)	May 23, 2017	June 27, 2017	Seiji Hayashi		
Saho-kun & Hakase no Dokidoki Jikken-shitsu (佐保くん&ハカセのドキドキ実験室)	May 29, 2017	June 4, 2017	dollly		
Shinzō ni Kui wo Uchitsukete (心臓に杭を打ちつけて)	June 1, 2017	July 12, 2018	Arashi Omiya		
Dorei Yūgi (奴隷遊戯) (Note: Part 1: June 9, 2017–November 8, 2019; Guren: December 6, 2019–December 24, 2021)	June 9, 2017	December 24, 2021	Nanami Yamai, Mitsu Ibuka, Takashi Kimura		
Yumizuka Iroha wa Tejun ga Daiji! (弓塚いろはは手順が大事！)	June 13, 2017	September 18, 2018	Daisuke Yui		
Otokozaka (男坂)	July 7, 2017 (Note: transferred from Weekly Playboy)	November 11, 2023	Masami Kurumada		
Aisareru yori ￮-saretai (愛されるより○されたい)	August 3, 2017	November 23, 2017	Akira Yūki		
Rojiura Bunch (路地裏バンチ)	August 7, 2017	April 30, 2018	Matsumoto Kabata		
Mone-san no Majimesugiru Tsukiaikata (モネさんのマジメすぎるつき合い方)	August 11, 2017	September 13, 2019	Masaki Gotō		
Mansatsu: Mankoro (漫殺-マンコロ-)	August 15, 2017	April 24, 2018	Hechii		
High Risk Mission Therapy (ハイリスクミッションセラピー)	August 22, 2017	February 19, 2019	Ayumi Nakashima		
Slime Life (スライムライフ)	August 23, 2017	November 1, 2020	Megasawara		
Koharubiyori (小春日和)	August 28, 2017	September 1, 2017	Hayato Yahagi, Kei Hira		
Saguri-chan Tankentai (さぐりちゃん探検隊)	August 31, 2017	January 31, 2019	Yoco Akiyama		
Mieppari Syndrome (見栄っぱりシンドローム)	September 1, 2017	April 27, 2018	Mao Nagata		
Aejuma-sama no Gakkō (あえじゅま様の学校)	September 2, 2017	June 30, 2018	Reiji Suzumaru		
Bokutachi Hoiku-ka Kōkō 1-nensei (ぼくたち保育科高校1年生)	September 14, 2017	June 21, 2018	Yoshikage Danjō		
Tomogui Kyōshitsu (友食い教室)	September 17, 2017	January 6, 2019	Yusura Kankitsu, Yū Sawase		
Mia: Unjō no Neverland (MIA-雲上のネバーランド-)	September 20, 2017	October 25, 2017	Wubao		
Juni Taisen: Zodiac War (十二大戦, Jūni Taisen)	September 23, 2017	May 12, 2018	Nisio Isin, Akira Akatsuki		
Hoshi no Ōji-sama (星の王子さま)	September 25, 2017	March 30, 2020	Man☆Gatarō		
Tōmei Ningen no Hone (透明人間の骨)	September 26, 2017	March 13, 2018	Jun Ogino		
Gag Shichimi (ギャグ七味)	October 2, 2017	October 8, 2017	Nobuhiro Ishii		
Hidarikiki no Eren (左ききのエレン)	October 7, 2017	October 8, 2022	Kappy, nifuni		
Vocchi-men (ヴォッチメン)	October 11, 2017	January 24, 2018	Toyotaka Haneda		
Seija no Kōshin (生者の行進)	October 20, 2017	September 28, 2018	Maru Mitsuchiyo		
Summertime Rendering (サマータイムレンダ, Summertime Render)	October 23, 2017	February 1, 2021	Yasuki Tanaka		
Tsugihagi Quest (ツギハギクエスト)	October 26, 2017	December 28, 2017	Sanshirō Kasama, Hikaru Uesugi		
Hitto Saku no Tsumeaka Kudasai! (ヒット作のツメアカください！)	November 5, 2017	February 12, 2021	Ryōichi Tenbō		
Otome no Teikoku (オトメの帝国)	November 22, 2017 (Note: transferred from Grand Jump WEB)	September 10, 2025	Torajirō Kishi		
Rifle Is Beautiful (ライフル・イズ・ビューティフル)	November 23, 2017 (Note: in parallel with Tonari no Young Jump)	July 2, 2020	Salmiakki		
Mukidashi no Hakuchō (剥き出しの白鳥)	December 14, 2017	December 6, 2018	Tsurun Hatomune		
Ex-Arm (エクスアーム)	December 20, 2017 (Note: transferred from Grand Jump)	June 26, 2019	HiRock, Shinya Komi		

=== 2018 ===
Manga	First Chapter	Final Chapter	Manga artist		
Manga	Karadasagashi Kai (カラダ探し 解)	January 5, 2018	Manga artist	January 25, 2019	Welzard, Katsutoshi Murase
Darling in the Franxx (ダーリン・イン・ザ・フランキス)	January 14, 2018	January 26, 2020	Code:000, Kentarō Yabuki		
Darling in the Franxx! (ダーリン・イン・ザ・フランキス)	January 14, 2018	July 11, 2018	mato		
Hell's Paradise: Jigokuraku (地獄楽, Jigokuraku)	January 22, 2018	January 25, 2021	Yūji Kaku		
Suginami Tōbatsu Kōmuin (スギナミ討伐公務員)	January 31, 2018	February 27, 2019	Robinson Haruhara, Yūki Satō		
Shinmai Nitta-ism (シンマイ新田イズム)	February 3, 2018	December 22, 2018	Shōgo Ueno, Hirakei		
Sekai Seifuku!! Shrimp Kingdom (世界征服!!シュリンプキングダム)	February 8, 2018	January 3, 2019	Yō Ikoma		
The Sign of Abyss (ヨルの鍵, Yoru no Kagi)	February 13, 2018	June 12, 2020	Maya Takamura		
Kokoronashi no Kirimu (心なしのキリム)	February 21, 2018	March 7, 2018	Kū Tanaka, Mitsuki Nagata		
Muhyo to Rōji no Mahōritsu Sōdan Jimusho: Mazoku Magushi-hen (ムヒョとロージーの魔法律相談事務所[魔属魔具師編])	March 19, 2018	March 7, 2019	Yoshiyuki Nishi		
Godzilla Kaijū Wakusei (GODZILLA 怪獣惑星)	March 29, 2018	September 27, 2018	Youth Kurahashi		
Gag Mangaka Ningen Dock Death Race (ギャグマンガ家 人間ドックデスレース)	April 2, 2018	April 5, 2018	Tsunomaru		
Black Torch	April 11, 2018 (Note: transferred from Jump Square)	July 11, 2018	Tsuyoshi Takaki		
World's End Harem: Fantasia (終末のハーレム ファンタジア, Shūmatsu no Harem Fantasia)	April 19, 2018 (Note: In parallel with Ultra Jump from 2018 to 2022)	April 26, 2026	LINK, SAVAN		
Neko, Host Hajimemashita (猫、ホストはじめました)	April 20, 2018	April 22, 2018	Tomomi Ōta		
Shi no Tori (死ノ鳥)	April 25, 2018	March 13, 2019	Dr. Imu		
Bōkyaku Battery (忘却バッテリー)	April 26, 2018	present	Eko Mikawa		
Kono Saki, Dobunuma Chūi (この先、どぶ沼注意)	May 1, 2018	September 18, 2018	Hoshikabi		
Kojirase Hyakki Do Minor (こじらせ百鬼ドマイナー)	May 2, 2018 (Note: in parallel with Jump Square)	April 17, 2020	Kōta Nangō		
Bara to Buta (薔薇と豚)	May 12, 2018	December 8, 2018	Iito Itō		
Chō Isekai Tensei Tan Deus Ex Machina (超異世界転生譚デウスエクスマキナ)	May 28, 2018	July 1, 2018	Tarō Fukuoka		
Abyss Rage (アビスレイジ)	May 31, 2018	February 4, 2021	Nariaki Narita		
Saotome Shimai wa Manga no Tame nara!? (早乙女姉妹は漫画のためなら!?)	June 6, 2018	June 23, 2021	Ryōhei Yamamoto		
Kimi ga Fushigi (君が不思議)	June 11, 2018	September 3, 2018	Mushi Kogane		
Koisuru One Piece (恋するワンピース)	June 18, 2018	January 22, 2026	Daiki Ihara		
One Piece: Koby-ni no Kobiyama - Uri Futatsunagi no Daihihō (恋するワンピース)	June 18, 2018	July 1, 2019	Nakamaru		
Psycho Against (サイコアゲンスト)	June 30, 2018	March 7, 2020	Roku Hiraishi, Shu Kageyama		
Lycopene the Tomatoy Poodle (トマトイプーのリコピン, Tomatoypoo no Lycopene)	July 9, 2018 (Note: transferred from Weekly Shōnen Jump)	March 10, 2025	Kōji Ōishi		
Kako no Anata wo Yūkai Shimashita (過去のあなたを誘拐しました)	July 16, 2018	October 28, 2019	Tsubasa Aguni, Yasuyuki Nekoi		
KoLD8: King of the Living Dead (8LDK―屍者ノ王―, 8LDK: Shisha no Ō)	July 22, 2018	January 6, 2019	Pageratta		
Hōki ni Matagaru Shūkatsu Sensō (ホウキにまたがる就活戦争)	July 25, 2018	May 29, 2019	Osamu Edogawa		
Tokedase! Mizore-chan (とけだせ！みぞれちゃん)	July 26, 2018	April 17, 2020	Hanao Tabi		
Land Lock	August 3, 2018	June 28, 2019	Ai Odahara		
Jazu (邪図)	August 13, 2018	October 2, 2018	Boomerang Pantsu Yarō		
Nano Hazard (ナノハザード)	August 14, 2018	February 26, 2019	Shōshō Kurihara, Kazāna		
Shin'en Resist Cure (シンエンレジスト CURE)	August 18, 2018 (Note: in parallel with Ultra Jump)	July 19, 2019	Kazuyoshi Yamamoto, Shinichirō Naruie		
Shōwa Otome Otogibanashi (昭和オトメ御伽話)	August 21, 2018	May 12, 2020	Sana Kirioka		
Sōsei no Onmyōji Tenen Jakko: Nishoku Kokkeiga (双星の陰陽師 天縁若虎〜二色滑稽画〜)	August 27, 2018	November 26, 2018	Yoshiaki Sukeno		
Wagamama Hime no Hie-tori Seikatsu (わがまま姫の冷えとり生活)	August 27, 2018	September 2, 2018	Ran Katsuragi		
Curtain's Up, I'm Off (開演のベルでおやすみ, Kaien no Bell de Oyasumi)	September 19, 2018	December 11, 2019	Akitaka Imakoshi		
Soloist in a Cage (檻ノ中のソリスト, Ori no Naka no Soloist)	September 29, 2018	June 14, 2021	Shiro Moriya		
Black Clover Gaiden Quartet Knights (ブラッククローバー外伝 カルテットナイツ)	October 7, 2018	April 12, 2020	Yumiya Tashiro		
Mist Gears Blast	October 29, 2018	July 23, 2019	Hajime Tanaka, Yōichi Amano		
Tokui Taishitsukei Joshi no Hanashi (特異体質系女子の話)	December 18, 2018	July 2, 2019	Yagiri		
RWBY: The Official Manga	December 20, 2018	June 25, 2020	Bunta Kinami		
Dricam!! (ドリキャン!!)	December 22, 2018	December 28, 2019	Yū Chiba		
Spotless Love: This Love Cannot Be Any More Beautiful. (この恋はこれ以上綺麗にならない。, Kono Koi wa Kore Ijō Kirei ni Naranai.)	December 25, 2018	June 9, 2020	Ōtarō Maijō, Arata Momose		
Moon Land (ムーンランド)	December 27, 2018	November 5, 2020	Sai Yamagishi		
Kao ga Konoyo ni Mui Tenai (顔がこの世に向いてない。)	December 28, 2018	August 28, 2020	Manose		
Fuchū San Oku En Jiken wo Keikaku Jikkō Shita no wa Watashi desu. (府中三億円事件を計画・実行したのは私です。)	December 29, 2018	December 31, 2019	Shirota, MUSASHI		
Rettō Gan no Tensei Majutsushi (劣等眼の転生魔術師)	December 30, 2018	December 31, 2023	Yusura Kankitsu, Hinata Yaya		

=== 2019 ===
Manga	First Chapter	Final Chapter	Manga artist		
Manga	Demon Tune	January 4, 2019 (Note: transferred from Jump Square)	Manga artist	May 2, 2019	Yūki Kodama
Chained Soldier (魔都精兵のスレイブ, Mato Seihei no Slave)	January 5, 2019	present	Takahiro, Yōhei Takemura		
The Vertical World (タテの国, Tate no Kuni)	January 10, 2019	April 1, 2021	Kū Tanaka		
Oyakusoku no Neverland (お約束のネバーランド)	January 11, 2019	March 28, 2019	Shūhei Miyazaki		
Gunjō ni Siren (群青にサイレン)	February 4, 2019 (Note: transferred from You)	August 3, 2020	Mikan Momokuri		
Arata Primal: The New Primitive (アラタプライマル, Arata Primal)	February 8, 2019	November 8, 2019	Daisuke Oikawa, Katsutoshi Murase		
Mutō to Satō (むとうとさとう)	February 14, 2019	February 11, 2021	Taishō Akatsuka		
Newton no Tsubomi (ニュートンの蕾)	March 5, 2019	October 1, 2019	Shiyu Tamayura		
Spy × Family	March 25, 2019	present	Tatsuya Endō		
'Tis Time for "Torture," Princess (姫様“拷問”の時間で, Hime-sama "Gōmon" no Jikan desu)	April 2, 2019	August 19, 2025	Robinson Haruhara, Hirakei		
Heart Gear	April 3, 2019	June 26, 2024	Tsuyoshi Takaki		
Kimetsu Between the Scenes! (鬼滅の刃公式スピンオフ「きめつのあいま！」, Kimetsu no Yaiba Kōshiki Spinoff "Kimetsu no Aima!")	April 7, 2019	September 29, 2019	Ryōji Hirano		
Nani ga Nyan Demo Isōrō!! (なにがニャンでも居候!!)	April 8, 2019	August 26, 2019	Migu		
Kanojo to Kare (彼女と彼)	April 17, 2019	July 21, 2021	Kaoru		
Kōya no Kotobuki Hikōtai (荒野のコトブキ飛行隊)	April 24, 2019	March 25, 2020	Muneaki Taoka, Tasuku Sugie		
Junjō Sentai Virginias (純情戦隊ヴァージニアス)	April 25, 2019	July 25, 2021	Tarō Fukuoka		
Tonari no Heya kara Aegigoe ga Suru n desu kedo... (隣の部屋から喘ぎ声がするんですけど...)	May 11, 2019	December 28, 2019	Suzuo		
Haikyū-bu!! (ハイキュー部!!)	May 13, 2019	March 24, 2025	Kyōhei Miyajima		
Shijin-sō no Satsujin (屍人荘の殺人)	May 25, 2019	May 15, 2021	Masahiro Imamura, Masaru Miyokawa		
2.5 Dimensional Seduction (2.5次元の誘惑, 2.5 Jigen no Yūwaku)	June 15, 2019	December 20, 2025	Yū Hashimoto		
Hachūrui-chan wa Natsukanai (爬虫類ちゃんは懐かない)	June 18, 2019	June 23, 2020	Masahito Sasaki		
Hina Change (ヒナちゃんチェンジ, Hina-chan Change)	June 28, 2019	June 12, 2020	Gaku Kajikawa		
Dear Sa-chan (さっちゃん、僕は。, Sacchan, Boku wa.)	July 3, 2019	October 7, 2020	Iori Asaga		
Kaibitsu Shōjo wa Hatsukoi no Yume wo Miru ka? (怪物少女は初恋の夢を見るか?)	July 17, 2019	May 6, 2020	Rishin Arima		
Hello World: The Manga (HELLO WORLD)	July 19, 2019 (Note: in parallel with Ultra Jump)	April 3, 2020	Manatsu Suzuki, Yoshihiro Sono		
Omukae ni Agarimashita.: Kokudo Kōtsūshō Kokudo Seisaku Kyoku Yūmei Suishin-ka (お迎えに上がりました。〜国土交通省国土政策局 幽冥推進課〜)	July 26, 2019	December 25, 2020	Miwa Sakurai		
Romantic Killer (ロマンティック・キラー)	July 30, 2019	June 2, 2020	Wataru Momose		
Hello (Rabukome) World (はろー(らぶこめ)わーるど)	August 9, 2019	January 17, 2020	Rippo Inukai		
Delivery Ojisan (デリバリーおじさん)	August 15, 2019	September 26, 2019	Yū Oka, Terubō Aono		
Rengoku no Toshi (恋獄の都市)	August 23, 2019	August 7, 2020	Kyōhei Tawara		
Hokkaido Gals Are Super Adorable! (道産子ギャルはなまらめんこい, Dosanko Gyaru wa Namaramenkoi)	September 4, 2019	September 11, 2024	Kai Ikada		
5 Page Inai ni Nakeru Manga (５ページ以内に泣ける漫画)	September 13, 2019	October 14, 2019	Osamu Edogawa		
Suitō to! (すいとーと!)	September 29, 2019	October 25, 2020	Yui Okino		
Oishii Kōhii no Irekata (おいしいコーヒーのいれ方)	October 2, 2019	October 12, 2022	Yuko Murayama, Yūki Aonuma, Ao Suzumemura, Yū		
Ohayō Psychopath (おはようサイコパス)	October 8, 2019	March 10, 2020	Gemba Aomi		
Attack of Zashiki Children (アタック・オブ・ザシキチルドレン)	October 15, 2019	February 29, 2020	Tatsuki Ōkubo		
Psycho-Pass 3 (サイコパス 3) (Note: Main Series: October 26, 2019–August 28, 2021; First Inspector: October 30, 2021–July 30, 2022)	October 26, 2019	July 30, 2022	Saru Hashino		
Sensen Ryuten (千戦流転)	October 28, 2019	November 25, 2019	Ryō Nishino, Yū Aoki		
East, Into the Night (夜ヲ東ニ, Yoru wo Higashi ni)	October 31, 2019	May 28, 2020	Angyaman		
Himitsu no Kajitsu (秘密の果実)	November 7, 2019	September 17, 2020	Yoshio Akai		
Senko Battle (センコーバトル)	November 29, 2019	October 20, 2023	Yoshitaka Koyama		
SSSS.Gridman	November 30, 2019	December 11, 2021	Yūki Konno		
Wa no Kage (環の影)	December 28, 2019	January 2, 2021	Kaiji Nakagawa		
Seija no Kōshin Revenge (生者の行進 Revenge)	December 29, 2019	February 6, 2022	Maru Mitsuchiyo, Yūki Satō		

== 2020s ==
=== 2020 ===
Manga	First Chapter	Final Chapter	Manga artist		
Manga	Jigokuraku: Saikyō no Nukenin Gaman no Gabimaru (じごくらく 〜最強の抜け忍 がまんの画眉丸〜)	January 20, 2020	Manga artist	June 29, 2020	Ōhashi
Kimi ga Shinu Made Ato 100-nichi (君が死ぬまであと100日)	January 23, 2020 (Note: in parallel with Manga Mee)	October 1, 2020	Migihara		
Ohisama Birdy (おひさまバーディー)	January 26, 2020	August 9, 2020	Daisuke Yui		
Teihen Tuber ga Uchū Sensō wo Tottemita (底辺チューバーが宇宙戦争を撮ってみた)	January 29, 2020	December 30, 2020	Tsunezō Watanabe, Banai		
Sono Shukujo wa Gūzō to Naru (その淑女は偶像となる)	January 30, 2020	February 20, 2022	Yōsuke Matsumoto		
Majo no Kaiga-shū (魔女の怪画集)	January 31, 2020 (Note: transferred from Jump Square)	May 2, 2020	Hachi		
Yōkoso Bōrei Sōgiya-san (ようこそ亡霊葬儀屋さん)	February 4, 2020	October 13, 2020	Ito Kira		
Kiruru Kill Me (きるる KILL ME)	February 23, 2020	present	Yasuhiro Kanō		
The 100 Girlfriends Who Really, Really, Really, Really, Really Love You (君のことが大大大大大好きな100人の彼女, Kimi no Koto ga Dai Dai Dai Dai Daisuki na 100-nin no Kanojo)	February 23, 2020 (Note: in parallel with Weekly Young Jump)	present	Rikito Nakamura, Yukiko Nozawa		
Itomo Tayasuku Okonawareru Jūsan-sai ga Ikiru Tame no Oshigoto (いともたやすく行われる十三歳が生きる為のお仕事)	February 27, 2020	September 8, 2022	Shokachū, Ryū Saiga		
Shikabane-sha no 13 Tsuki (屍者の13月)	March 31, 2020	August 17, 2021	Di Nian Miao		
Manken ni Bishōjo (漫研に美少女)	April 7, 2020	August 11, 2020	Taira Wadachi		
Henshū-sha☆Momii no Dai Bōken (変臭者☆モミーの大冒険)	May 9, 2020	May 30, 2020	Man☆Gatarō		
Excuse Me Dentist, It's Touching Me! (歯医者さん、あタってます！, Haisha-san, Atattemasu!)	May 16, 2020	January 21, 2023	Sho Yamazaki		
Oshi no Ko (【推しの子】)	May 16, 2020	November 21, 2024	Aka Akasaka, Mengo Yokoyari		
Honki Daseba Omae Koroseru (本気出せばお前殺せる)	May 20, 2020	December 24, 2021	Cisco Yaneura		
Jisatsu Hōjo (自殺幇女)	May 29, 2020	September 18, 2020	Yoshito Okita, Katsutoshi Murase		
Don't Blush, Sekime-san! (赤面しないで関目さん, Sekimen Shinaide Sekime-san)	June 21, 2020	April 26, 2022	Shigure Tokita		
World's End Harem: Britannia Lumiére (終末のハーレム～ブリタニア リュミエール～, Shūmatsu no Harem Britannia Lumiére)	June 26, 2020	July 29, 2021	LINK, Kira Etō		
Kaiju No. 8 (怪獣8号, Kaijū 8-gō)	July 3, 2020	July 18, 2025	Naoya Matsumoto		
Senpai! Ore no Koe de Iyasarenaide Kudasai! (先輩！俺の声で癒されないでください！)	July 5, 2020	December 20, 2020	Chilt		
Ghost Reaper Girl (ゴーストガール, GHOST GIRL)	July 13, 2020	present	Akissa Saiké		
Gaming Ojōsama (ゲーミングお嬢様)	July 21, 2020 (Note: transferred from Rookie)	December 13, 2022	Dai@nani, Mokomoko Yoshio, Masao Maru		
World's End Harem: Fantasia Academy (終末のハーレム ファンタジア学園, Shūmatsu no Harem Fantasia Gakuen)	August 2, 2020 (Note: transferred from Ultra Jump)	July 17, 2022	LINK, Okada Andō		
Mogumogu Mogyū (モグモグモギュー)	August 4, 2020	February 22, 2021	Yūta Oi		
Argonavis from BanG Dream!	August 11, 2020	March 23, 2021	Kyōhei Miyajima		
Kubo Won't Let Me Be Invisible (久保さんは僕を許さない, Kubo-san wa Mobu o Yurusanai)	August 12, 2020	March 8, 2023	Nene Yukimori		
Killer Friends	September 9, 2020	April 7, 2021	Rockin' Cartoon		
Sukinakoto Shite Ikiteku (好きなことして生きていく)	September 18, 2020	February 19, 2021	Daikage Ōmine		
Ron Kamonohashi: Deranged Detective (鴨乃橋ロンの禁断推理, Kamonohashi Ron no Kindan Suiri)	October 11, 2020	July 6, 2025	Akira Amano		
Kizudarake no Piano Sonata (傷だらけのピアノソナタ)	October 27, 2020	May 4, 2021	Keigo Saitō		
Boku yori Medatsu na Ryūgakusei (僕より目立つな竜学生)	November 6, 2020	July 2, 2021	Kenta Yuzuriha		
Even If You Slit My Mouth (口が裂けても君には, Kuchi ga Saketemo Kimi ni wa)	November 10, 2020	December 19, 2023	Akari Kajimoto		
Diamond in the Rough (アラガネの子, Aragane no Ko)	November 25, 2020	December 27, 2023	Nao Sasaki		
Hyperinflation (ハイパーインフレーション)	November 27, 2020	March 17, 2023	Kyū Sumiyoshi		
Debby the Corsifa wa Makezugirai (デビィ・ザ・コルシファは負けず嫌い)	December 7, 2020	March 25, 2024	Masahiro Hirakata		
Deadpool: Samurai (デッドプール：SAMURAI)	December 10, 2020	June 24, 2021 (Note: resumed with Deadpool: Samurai 2nd Season in 2024)	Sanshirō Kasama, Hikaru Uesugi		
Togetoge (とげとげ)	December 21, 2020	April 18, 2022	Kenta Tsuchida		

=== 2021 ===
Manga	First Chapter	Final Chapter	Manga artist		
Manga	Ex-Arm EXA (エクスアームエクサ)	January 10, 2021 (Note: in parallel with Grand Jump Mucha)	Manga artist	March 14, 2021	HiRock, Shinya Komi
Ex-Arm Another Code (エクスアーム アナザーコード)	January 16, 2021 (Note: in parallel with Ultra Jump)	March 20, 2021	Atarō Kumo, Shinya Komi		
Red List Zetsumetsu Shinkaron (レッドリスト 絶滅進化論)	January 27, 2021	February 9, 2022	Katsutoshi Murase		
Shin Gunjō Senki (真・群青戦記)	February 24, 2021 (Note: in parallel with Weekly Young Jump)	March 23, 2022	Masaki Kasahara, Azychika		
New World Order (ニューワールドオーダー) (Note: Indies series)	April 2, 2021	February 25, 2022	Hitoshi Isamu		
Beranda ni Neko (?) ga Kita (ベランダに猫（？）が来た)	April 3, 2021	January 29, 2022	Nioshi Noai		
Dandadan (ダンダダン)	April 6, 2021	present	Yukinobu Tatsu		
Borderless Name (ボーダレスネーム)	April 23, 2021	November 5, 2021	Bunshitsu Yanaka		
Konya Bokura wa Otomari wo Suru (今夜僕らはお泊りをする)	May 5, 2021	January 19, 2022	Rioto Rie		
Mutant wa Ningen no Kanojo to Kiss ga Shitai (ミュータントは人間の彼女とキスがしたい)	May 18, 2021	January 25, 2022	Maki, Giba-chan		
Aragae! Dark Elf-chan (あらがえ！ダークエルフちゃん)	June 6, 2021	March 13, 2022	Yū Nabe		
Kinemaquia (キネマキア)	June 21, 2021	September 12, 2022	Kōta Ōhira		
Taishō Otome Otogibanashi: Enseika no Shokutaku (大正処女御伽話-厭世家ノ食卓-)	July 3, 2021	December 31, 2021	Sana Kirioka		
Miss Little Gray (ミス・リトルグレイ)	July 5, 2021	August 8, 2022	Shio Hodaka		
Karappo no Aine (からっぽのアイネ)	July 8, 2021	January 20, 2022	Maria Komaki		
Yarinaoshi Hime wa Otto to Koi Shitai (やり直し姫は夫と恋したい)	July 9, 2021	September 2, 2022	Kōkū Tanue		
Godaigo Daigo (ゴダイゴダイゴ)	July 13, 2021	August 5, 2024	Kōnosuke		
Majimesakyubasu Hiiragi-san (マジメサキュバス柊さん)	July 16, 2021	September 9, 2022	Chilt		
Aurora Node	July 21, 2021	August 3, 2022	Isse Hako		
Kami no Manimani (神のまにまに)	July 29, 2021	December 8, 2022	Reiji Agasa		
The Kajiki Chef: Divine Cuisine (神食の料理人, Kajiki no Ryōrinin)	July 31, 2021	April 29, 2023	Sanami Suzuki		
Hara Hara Sensei (腹腹先生)	August 2, 2021	October 10, 2022	Yanagi Takakuchi		
Eightward Mahō Gakkō e Yōkoso! (エイトワード魔法学校へようこそ！)	August 5, 2021	April 28, 2022	Sarii B		
Gorilla Joshikōsei (ゴリラ女子高生)	August 19, 2021	June 30, 2022	Shūma Ōtomo		
Kawaisugi Crisis (カワイスギクライシス)	September 20, 2021 (Note: in parallel with Jump Square)	present	Mitsuru Kido		
Tengu to Warashi (天狗とわらし)	September 28, 2021	April 20, 2022	Gensui Shiitake		
Hasegawa Tomohiro no Digital Sakuga Funtōki: Analog no Mōshigo, Digital ni Idomu (長谷川智広のデジタル作画奮闘記～アナログの申し子、デジタルに挑む～)	October 1, 2021	November 12, 2021	Tomohiro Hasegawa		
Satsuriku no ō (殺戮の王)	October 9, 2021	February 25, 2023	Yagi-kun		
Magilumiere Magical Girls Inc. (株式会社マジルミエ, Kabushiki Gaisha Majirumie)	October 20, 2021	July 9, 2025	Sekka Iwata, Yū Aoki		
Kokoro no Program (ココロのプログラム)	October 31, 2021	October 15, 2023	Hinata Nakamura		
3-nen C-gumi Onigawara Sensei: Naze ka Mina ni Sukarete Taiiku Kyōshi (3年C組鬼瓦先生 ～なぜか皆に好かれている体育教師～)	November 7, 2021	April 10, 2022	Doden-chan		
Dragon no Ko (ドラゴンの子)	November 9, 2021	March 28, 2023	Kū Tanaka		
After School Mate (アフタースクールメイト)	November 30, 2021	May 17, 2022	Kuon Umino		
Salad Viking (サラダ・ヴァイキング)	December 4, 2021	March 25, 2023	Sōichirō		
Zenbu Bukkowasu (全部ぶっ壊す)	December 5, 2021	December 25, 2022	Teito Heji, Sai Yamagishi		
Sebumi Reifu no Iikibun (瀬文麗歩のイイ奇聞)	December 6, 2021	July 11, 2022	Saki Akamura		
Takopi's Original Sin (タコピーの原罪, Takopii no Genzai)	December 10, 2021	March 25, 2022	Taizan 5		
Make the Exorcist Fall in Love (エクソシストを堕とせない, Exorcist wo Otosenai)	December 15, 2021	present	Aruma Arima, Masuku Fukayama		
Higan Shigan no Monodomoyo (彼岸此岸のものどもよ)	December 17, 2021	May 6, 2022	Keisuke Niihama		

=== 2022 ===
Manga	First Chapter	Final Chapter	Manga artist		
Manga	Anten-sama no Haranōchi (アンテン様の腹の中)	January 30, 2022	Manga artist	February 12, 2023	Itsuki Yosuga
Stage S (ステージS)	March 6, 2022	September 8, 2024	Tomoya Harikawa		
100-nichi Go ni XXX suru Onna Shachō to Shinyū Shain (100日後に×××する女社長と新入社員) (Note: Indies series)	March 11, 2022	July 29, 2022	Suzuo		
Red Cat Ramen (ラーメン赤猫, Ramen Aka Neko)	March 14, 2022 (Note: Listed as an Indies series until October 2022)	present	Angyaman		
Dragon Quest: Dai no Daibouken - Yuusha Avan to Gokuen no Maou (ドラゴンクエスト ダイの大冒険 勇者アバンと獄炎の魔王, Doragon Kuesto: Dai no Daibouken Yuusha Avan to Gokuen no Maou)	March 19, 2022 (Note: in parallel with V Jump)	present	Riku Sanjō, Yūsaku Shibata		
Sushi Sister Hunter (スシシスターハンター)	March 25, 2022	December 16, 2022	Tomoko Machinery		
Koibito Ijō Yūjin Miman (恋人以上友人未満)	March 29, 2022	September 2, 2025	yatoyato		
Junket Bank (ジャンケットバンク)	March 30, 2022 (Note: in parallel with Weekly Young Jump)	present	Ikkō Tanaka		
One Piece Gakuen (ONE PIECE学園)	April 8, 2022 (Note: in parallel with Saikyō Jump)	present	Sōhei Kōji		
Marriagetoxin (マリッジトキシン)	April 20, 2022	present	Jōmyakun, Mizuki Yoda		
Bubble (バブル)	April 22, 2022	May 23, 2022	Erubo Hijihara		
Ayakashi Triangle (あやかしトライアングル)	April 25, 2022 (Note: transferred from Weekly Shōnen Jump)	September 25, 2023	Kentarō Yabuki		
Camellia no Curtain (カメリアのカーテン)	April 29, 2022	December 23, 2022	Kazusa Inaoka		
You and I Are Polar Opposites (正反対な君と僕, Seihantai na Kimi to Boku)	May 2, 2022	November 25, 2024	Kōcha Agasawa		
Bakumatsu Tobaku Barubaroi (幕末賭博バルバロイ)	May 20, 2022	July 28, 2023	Homura Kawamoto, Toyotaka Haneda		
Tokyo Underworld (深東京, Shin Tōkyō)	May 29, 2022	December 22, 2024	Kenji Sakaki		
Teruteru Kensetsu (Kabu) (てるてる建設(株))	June 6, 2022	April 10, 2023	Asako Mabuchi, Kōhei Andō		
Moebana (もえばな)	June 30, 2022	March 30, 2023	Hidari Yokoyama		
Chainsaw Man (チェンソーマン 第二部, Chainsaw Man Dainibu)	July 13, 2022 (Note: resumed from Weekly Shōnen Jump)	March 25, 2026	Tatsuki Fujimoto		
Uchū no Tamago (宇宙の卵)	July 23, 2022	December 24, 2022	Rikimaru Hodono		
Baby Blooper (ベイビーブルーパー)	July 29, 2022	April 21, 2023	Wakaeru Haruni		
Leviathan (リバイアサン)	August 2, 2022	February 28, 2023	Kuroi Shiro		
Haru no Yokujitsu (春の翌日)	August 9, 2022	February 19, 2024	Yoshihiro Haida		
Tanukitsune no Gon (タヌキツネのゴン)	August 11, 2022	January 11, 2024	Sawaru Mega		
Hasegawa Tomohiro no Kaettekita Dejitaru Sakuga Funtō-ki: Anriaru Enjin-hen (長谷川智広の帰ってきたデジタル作画奮闘記 ～アンリアルエンジン編～)	August 23, 2022	October 4, 2022	Tomohiro Hasegawa		
Skeleton Double (スケルトンダブル)	August 26, 2022	June 14, 2024	Tokaku Kondō		
Ghostbuster Osamu (限界煩悩活劇オサム, Genkai Bonnō Katsugeki Osamu)	September 2, 2022	August 25, 2023	Getabako		
The Dark Doctor Ikuru (不治の病は不死の病., Fuji no Yamai wa Fushi no Yamai)	September 6, 2022	February 6, 2024	Hechii		
Boku no Buki wa Kōgekiryoku 1 no Hari Shikanai (僕の武器は攻撃力１の針しかない)	September 11, 2022	present	Kamiyoshi, Nabetsuyo		
Kindergarten Wars (幼稚園WARS, Yōchien Wars)	September 15, 2022 (Note: Listed as an Indies series until March 2023)	present	Yū Chiba		
Karadasagashi I (カラダ探し 異)	September 24, 2022	March 11, 2023	Harumi Doki, Katsutoshi Murase		
The Game Devil (ゲー魔王, Gē Maō)	September 28, 2022	June 20, 2024	Kakunoshin Futsuzawa		
My Girlfriend Is 8 Meters Tall (ちえりの恋は8メートル, Chieri no Koi wa 8 Meters)	October 2, 2022	January 26, 2025	Watari Mitogawa		
Giri no Otōto ni Korosareru (義理の弟に殺される)	October 4, 2022	May 30, 2023	Morudau		
Tajū Jinkaku Kanojo (多重人格彼女)	October 9, 2022	March 5, 2023	Homekorosuke, Fanko		
Kinnikujima (筋肉島)	October 15, 2022	August 17, 2024	Nariaki Narita		
Hōkago Himitsu Club (放課後ひみつクラブ)	October 18, 2022	December 10, 2024	Teppei Fukushima		
Naruto: Sasuke's Story—The Uchiha and the Heavenly Stardust: The Manga (NARUTO-ナルト- サスケ烈伝うちはの末裔と天球の星, Naruto Sasuke Retsuden Uchiha no Matsuei to Tenkyū no Hoshikuzu)	October 23, 2022	April 23, 2023	Shingo Kimura		
Naruto: Konoha's Story—The Steam Ninja Scrolls: The Manga (NARUTO-ナルト- 木ノ葉新伝湯煙忍法帖, Naruto Konoha Shinden Yukemuri Ninpōchō)	October 29, 2022	May 27, 2023	Natsuo Sai		
holoX MEETing! (ホロックスみーてぃんぐ！)	November 1, 2022	July 18, 2023	Anmitsu Okada		
Manko☆Chishin - Baka demo Wakaru Koten Bungaku (漫古☆知新-バカでもわかる古典文学-)	November 10, 2022	April 13, 2023	Man☆Gatarō		
Janji (雀児)	November 21, 2022	December 4, 2023	Kazuki Hiraoka		
Dorei no Watashi-shi Mofumofu Shujin ga Tōtokute Kyō mo Buji Shibō (奴隷の私氏 モフモフ主人が尊くて 今日も無事死亡)	November 25, 2022	July 14, 2023	Nioshi Noai		
Me and My Gangster Neighbour (ぼくと仁義なきおじさん, Boku to Jinginaki Ojisan)	December 3, 2022	October 21, 2023	Wataru Momose		
Kemonokuni (ケモノクニ)	December 7, 2022	May 20, 2026	Kei Tsuchiya		
Ban-Ō (バンオウ-盤王-)	December 16, 2022	June 7, 2024	Tomoya Watabiki, Garaku Akinai		
Rental 105 (レンタル105)	December 19, 2022	April 24, 2023	Natsume Yamamoto		
Dorei Yūgi DIDI (奴隷遊戯DIDI)	December 31, 2022	present	Mitsu Ibuka, Natsudō Munakata		

=== 2023 ===
Manga	First Chapter	Final Chapter	Manga artist		
Manga	Jiangshi X (キョンシーX)	January 23, 2023	Manga artist	February 19, 2024	Norihiko Kurazono
Yumeochi: Dreaming of Falling for You (ユメオチ～ユメで僕らは恋にオチる～, Yumeochi: Yume de Bokura wa Koi ni Ochiru)	February 5, 2023	October 29, 2023	Ryōma Kitada		
Zao Saga (ザオ・サガ) (Note: Indies series)	February 8, 2023	November 1, 2023	Ryu Genkei		
Mukashi wa Yokatta (昔は良かった)	February 13, 2023	September 11, 2023	Tsukasa Sei		
Stan for Salvation (サイハテ四重奏, Saihate Shijūsō)	February 17, 2023	July 14, 2023	Kōzuki Osamu		
Beat & Motion	February 25, 2023	January 25, 2025	Naoki Fujita		
Jinrui-Shoku: Blight of Man (人類蝕, Jinrui Shoku)	February 28, 2023	December 31, 2024	Mitsuchiyomaru, Yūki Satō		
Fire Emblem Engage (ファイアーエムブレム エンゲージ)	March 3, 2023 (Note: in parallel with Saikyō Jump)	present	Kazurō Kyō		
Elf Otto to Dwarf Kome (エルフ夫とドワーフ嫁)	March 11, 2023	February 10, 2024	Yoshika Komatsu		
Hikensha Shia (被験者シア)	March 17, 2023	June 2, 2023	Kōki Jinnōchi		
Boku no Sefuku (ボクノセーフク)	March 23, 2023	September 21, 2023	Fuwa Jile		
Service Wars (接客無双, Sekkyaku Musō)	March 26, 2023	December 3, 2023	Tsurun Hatomune		
The Pension Life Vampire (ペンションライフ・ヴァンパイア)	April 1, 2023	March 16, 2024	Shoichi Taguchi		
Shibatarian (シバタリアン)	April 6, 2023	September 19, 2024	Katsuya Iwamuro		
Uma Musume Pretty Derby: Star Blossom (ウマ娘 プリティーダービー スターブロッサム)	April 10, 2023 (Note: in parallel with Young Jump! and Tonari no Young Jump)	present	Monjūsaki, Shin Hotani		
Hanome (刃ノ眼)	April 15, 2023	August 16, 2025	Matsuto		
Vibration Man (バイブマン, Vibe Man)	April 20, 2023	November 23, 2023	Tōki Iwai		
The Soul Spewing Wielder (タマロビ in アウト, Tamarobi In Out)	April 29, 2023	September 30, 2023	Isagi Mizanaga		
Kekkon suru tte itta yo ne? (結婚するって言ったよね？)	May 2, 2023	November 28, 2023	Otōto		
Handsome Must Die (ハンサムマストダイ)	May 7, 2023	October 29, 2023	Astra Ashima		
Blooming Love (半人前の恋人, Han'ninmae no Koibito)	May 9, 2023	December 2, 2025	Daichi Kawada		
My Girlfriend Gives Me Goosebumps! (偏愛ハートビート, Hen'ai Heartbeat)	May 15, 2023	January 15, 2024	Shunsuke Iino		
Toku “Tōken Ranbu: Hanamaru” Setsugetsuka (特『刀剣乱舞-花丸-』～雪月華～)	May 24, 2023	April 24, 2024 (Note: transferred to Comic Ogya)	Saru Hashino		
Renai Daikō (恋愛代行)	May 31, 2023 (Note: in parallel with Weekly Young Jump)	June 12, 2024	Aka Akasaka, Nishizawa 5mm		
Demon Lord Exchange!! (魔王さまエクスチェンジ!!, Maō-sama Exchange!!)	June 10, 2023	August 17, 2024	Riya Hozmi		
Spider-Man: Octo-Girl (スパイダーマン：オクトパスガール, Spider-Man: Octopus Girl)	June 20, 2023	January 7, 2025	Hideyuki Furuhashi, Betten Court		
Sachi's Records: Sachi's Book of Revelation (サチ録～サチの黙示録～, Sachiroku 〜Sachi no Mokushiroku〜)	July 7, 2023	April 25, 2025	Chanta		
Wild Strawberry (ワイルドストロベリー)	July 14, 2023	August 22, 2025	Ire Yonemoto		
Mikane and the Sea Woman (ぼくと海彼女, Boku to Umi Kanojo)	July 29, 2023	March 22, 2025	Aoko Kizaki		
Tenchi Mission (天地ミッション)	August 3, 2023	April 18, 2024	PETOKA		
Shojo Null (少女Null, Shōjo Null)	August 5, 2023	September 7, 2024	Kanae Nakanishi, Akima		
Shinitai Majo to Koroshitai Tenshu (死にたい魔女と殺したい店主)	August 11, 2023	February 16, 2024	Magiko		
History's Mentalist (歴史メンタリスト, Rekishi Mentalist)	August 13, 2023	March 10, 2024	Tomato Tri, Natsuko Uruma		
Tsuruko Returns the Favor (鶴子の恩返し, Tsuruko no Ongaeshi)	August 25, 2023	May 2, 2025	Hidari Yokoyama		
Diasporaiser (ディアスポレイザー)	September 15, 2023	December 22, 2023	Ondori Nukui		
Daddy and Buddy (ダディデバディ, Daddy de Buddy)	September 19, 2023	June 11, 2024	Tendai Yano		
Collector Is Dead: Tenbai Yā Bokumetsu-ko-chan-hen (コレクターイズデッド ～転売ヤー撲滅子ちゃん編～)	September 26, 2023	May 7, 2024	Takeru Yokohama, Seinen Mirai		
Rugby Rumble (最強の詩, Saikyō no Uta)	September 29, 2023	August 29, 2025	Daisuke Miyata		
Magical Girl Tsubame: I Will (Not) Save The World! (対世界用魔法少女つばめ, Tai Sekaiyō Mahō Shōjo Tsubame)	October 7, 2023	September 28, 2024	Mapollo 3		
Hope You're Happy, Lemon (クソ女に幸あれ, Kuso Onna ni Sachiare)	October 15, 2023	September 13, 2026	Mizuki Kishikawa		
Witch Enforcer (魔女の執行人, Majo no Shikkō Hito)	October 27, 2023	May 24, 2024	Shun Akagi		
Ai ga Omoi Jiraikei Vampire (愛が重い地雷系ヴァンパイア)	October 29, 2023	September 15, 2024	Rie		
At Summer's End (夏の終点, Natsu no Shūten)	November 21, 2023	June 4, 2024	Takuya Nishio		
Gyaru to Iinchō ga Gūzen Saikai suru Hanashi (ギャルと委員長が偶然再会する話)	December 4, 2023	present	Takuma Mitomo		
Big Face	December 13, 2023	March 19, 2025	Shio Sakiyama		
The God Before Me (目の前の神様, Me no Mae no Kamisama)	December 25, 2023	July 13, 2026	Shou Kunoda		

=== 2024 ===
Manga	First Chapter	Final Chapter	Manga artist		
Manga	Kaiju No. 8: B-Side (怪獣8号 side B, Kaijū 8-gō side B)	January 5, 2024	Manga artist	July 12, 2024	Naoya Matsumoto, Keiji Ando, Kentaro Hidano
Girl Meets Rock! (ふつうの軽音部, Futsū no Keionbu)	January 14, 2024	present	Kuwahali, Tetsuo Ideuchi		
Coronica no Nō (コロニカの脳) (Note: Indies series)	January 20, 2024	present	Minohashi Kō		
JK ga Toki Tomete Mita Kudan (JKが時止めてみた件)	January 25, 2024	August 22, 2024	Daishi Teikoku		
Astro Baby (アストロベイビー)	February 3, 2024	October 25, 2025	Shiro Moriya		
Thermae Romae Redux (続テルマエ・ロマエ, Zoku Thermae Romae)	February 6, 2024	present	Mari Yamazaki		
Jishiyō to Shitara Sekai Metsubō Shita Hanashi (自◯しようとしたら世界滅亡した話窪木恵之佑)	February 16, 2024	present	Enosuke Kuboki		
Navigatoria (ナヴィガトリア)	February 18, 2024	March 16, 2025	Waka Oshiishi		
The World of SKK Girls (SKK ◁少女たちの世界▷, SKK ◁ Shōjo-tachi no Sekai ▷)	February 24, 2024	May 17, 2025	Taisyo Akatsuka		
Set It and Forget It (ほったらかし飯, Hottarakashi Meshi)	February 29, 2024	July 11, 2024	Kakaru, Kiri Tono, Rie Shibuya		
Ankoku Delta (暗黒デルタ)	March 11, 2024	January 12, 2025	Alpa		
Goze Hotaru (ごぜほたる)	March 19, 2024	October 1, 2024	Kou Tosaya		
Ghost Fixers (ゴーストフィクサーズ)	March 22, 2024	October 16, 2026	Yasuki Tanaka		
Existential Unplugged (実存アンプラグド, Jitsuzon Unplugged)	March 31, 2024	December 22, 2024	Saji Komori, Kana Masaya, Junosuke Ito		
Gift of Poison (ドクの贈物, Doc no Okurimono)	April 4, 2024	September 19, 2024	DODOTAN		
Centuria (ケントゥリア)	April 8, 2024	present	Tohru Kuramori		
Machi and Oboro (おぼろとまち, Oboro to Machi)	April 13, 2024	May 10, 2025	Yuhra Ishito		
ByeByeBye (バイバイバイ)	April 21, 2024	July 21, 2024	Anneko		
RuriDragon (ルリドラゴン)	April 22, 2024 (Note: transferred from Weekly Shōnen Jump and in parallel with its digital version)	present	Masaoki Shindo		
Fool (さらしもの, Sarashimono)	April 26, 2024	August 23, 2024	Khota Ozaki		
I'm So Hungry I Could Eat Basashi (馬刺しが食べたい, Basashi ga Tabetai)	April 30, 2024	June 4, 2024	Sayoru Sakurai		
Deep Raputa (深層のラプタ, Shinsō no Raputa)	May 13, 2024	April 21, 2025	Kitanoda Sorakara		
Backpack Road (バクパ道)	May 16, 2024	July 6, 2024	PD		
Kunigei - Okuni University Art Department Film Program (クニゲル~大國大学藝術学部映画学科~, Kunigei: Ōkuni Daigaku Gei-jutsu Gakubu Eiga Gakka)	May 26, 2024	June 8, 2025	Yosuke Takano		
Taro Miyao Becomes a Cat Parent?! (宮王太郎が猫を飼うなんて, Miyaō Tarō ga Neko o Kau Nante)	May 31, 2024	March 28, 2025	Sho Yamazaki		
Kaiju No. 8: Relax (怪獣８号 RELAX)	June 7, 2024 (Note: in parallel with Saikyō Jump)	present	Kizuku Watanabe		
Meido no Kuroko-san (冥土の黒子さん)	June 11, 2024	April 29, 2025	DaArts		
Drunk Bullet (ドランクバレット)	June 16, 2024	January 12, 2025	Yanagi Takakuchi		
Mad	June 18, 2024	present	Yusuke Otori		
Shiba Inu Rooms (シバつき物件, Shiba-tsuki bukken)	June 27, 2024	present	Esu Omori		
Get Away, Matsumoto！-100 days escape- (逃げろ松本, Nigero Natsumoto)	July 6, 2024	May 17, 2025	Tsunehara Okusu		
Oversleeping Takahashi (寝坊する男, Nebosuru Otoko)	July 20, 2024	July 12, 2025	Koki Aguro		
No\Name	July 31, 2024	February 5, 2025	Rafal Jaki, MACHINE GAMU		
Deadpool: Samurai (デッドプール：SAMURAI 2nd season, Deadpool: Samurai 2nd Season)	August 8, 2024 (Note: resumed from Deadpool: Samurai in 2021)	February 26, 2026	Sanshirō Kasama, Hikaru Uesugi		
Boken ni Iku Fuku ga nai! (冒険に行く服がない！)	August 12, 2024	November 10, 2025	Tojō Negi		
Empyreal Cabinet (天傍台閣, Tenbodaikaku)	August 16, 2024	present	Fumiji Yuba		
Insect Girl (ムシムスメ, Mushi Musume)	August 25, 2024	June 8, 2025	Kanya Aki		
Darling's Vanishing Act (Runaway Darling-にげろダーリン-, Runaway Darling: Nigero Darling)	August 28, 2024	April 16, 2025	Yadu		
Strikeout Pitch (サンキューピッチ, Thank You Pitch)	September 3, 2024	present	Kyu Sumiyoshi		
Zenra Yūsha (全裸勇者)	September 13, 2024	April 25, 2025	Muscle Pain		
Hero Organization (英雄機関, Eiyū Kikan)	September 15, 2024	present	Kei Saikawa, Akira Takahashi		
No Gyaru in This Class (このクラスにギャルはいない, Kono Kurasu ni Gyaru wa Inai)	September 21, 2024	June 20, 2026	Shigure Tokita		
Marginal OL Kirigiri Giriko (限界OL霧切ギリ子)	September 24, 2024	present	Mitosupa Tsuchimoto		
Lunatic Terrapop (ルナティック・テラポップ)	September 27, 2024	February 13, 2026	Hisaya Hashida		
Smother Me	October 3, 2024	January 16, 2025	Hiroshi Shimomoto		
Yattara (ヤッターラ, Yattāra)	October 8, 2024	October 7, 2025	Ooyamada		
Bio Abyss (バイオアビス)	October 12, 2024	March 15, 2025	Aida Kanna		
Monochrome Days (モノクロのふたり, Monochrome no Futari)	October 13, 2024	August 2, 2026	Yosuke Matsumoto		
Bearby	October 14, 2024	August 4, 2025	Nūn		
Night Light Hounds (ナイトライトハウンズ)	October 19, 2024	April 11, 2026	Haruhisa Nakata		
Magokoro Scramble!~What Lies in Your Heart? (真心スクランブル！, Magakoro Scramble!)	October 24, 2024	February 27, 2025	Satoshi Taninaka		
The Urban Legend Files (都市伝説先輩, Toshiden Shuo Senpai)	November 16, 2024	July 11, 2026	Kazuki Hiraoka		
Ryota Killed His Brother (良太は弟を殺した, Ryōta wa Otōto wo Koroshita)	November 29, 2024	January 23, 2026	Ayumi Natori		
Drama Queen (ドラマクイン)	December 2, 2024	present	Kuraku Ichikawa		
Asura's Verdict (アスラの沙汰, Asura no Sata)	December 5, 2024	present	Utsugi Unohana		
Gubichibi (ぐびちび)	December 19, 2024	January 18, 2025 (Note: transferred to social media)	Saketamon		

=== 2025 ===
Manga	First Chapter	Final Chapter	Manga artist		
Manga	Waiting for the Sunlight (陽光ヲ待ツ, Yōkō o Matsu)	January 2, 2025	Manga artist	October 23, 2025	Haruka Nanase
Stellar Friends (星交O者, Seiko Oja)	January 12, 2025	July 20, 2025	Ichinohe		
Sirens Won't Sing For You (セイレーンは君に歌わない, Seirēn wa Kimi ni Utawanai)	January 13, 2025	November 3, 2025	Reiji Agasa		
My Marriage to Saneka (サネカの嫁入り, Saneka no Yomeiri)	January 21, 2025	November 25, 2025	Wataru Momose		
Darkest Corners of the Heart (こころの一番暗い部屋, Kokoro no Ichiban Kurai Heya)	February 2, 2025	February 15, 2025	Yūho Amayo		
The Marshal King	February 7, 2025	October 16, 2026	Boichi		
Eunuch of Empire (滅国の宦官, Mekkoku no Kangan)	February 10, 2025	January 26, 2026	Kei Saikawa, Kotaro Shono		
Shinewbi (イマニン, Imanin)	February 20, 2025	January 1, 2026	Asako Mabuchi, Kōhei Andō		
Love Is Overkill (ラブイズオーバーキル)	February 25, 2025	September 2, 2025	Astra Ashima		
Chuck Beans (チャックび～んず)	March 2, 2025	August 3, 2025	Tsurun Hatomune		
Ashi Dribbles Through (ドリブルヌッコあーしちゃん, Dribbling Nukko Ashi-chan)	March 3, 2025	August 4, 2025	Mononobu		
Maison and the Man-Eating Apartment (人喰いマンションと大家のメゾン, Hitokui Mansion to Oya no Mezon)	March 7, 2025	present	Kuu Tanaka, Akima		
Beast Orange (けものみかん, Kemonomikan)	March 13, 2025	August 14, 2025	Kyuko Soda		
Home at the Horizon (おかえり水平線, Okaeri Suiheisen)	March 23, 2025	present	Taiyo Watabe		
The Creepy and Freaky (こわいやさん, Kowai Ya-san)	March 26, 2025	May 27, 2026	Kamentotsu		
Hime Shinjatta! (姫死んじゃった！) (Note: Indies series)	April 3, 2025	September 18, 2025	Otōto		
War of the Adults (大人大戦, Otona Taisen)	April 5, 2025	present	Kappy, Masaaki Tsuzuki		
Ajin no Ō (亜人の王)	April 11, 2025	October 31, 2025	Yagi-kun		
G.G.G. (GGG-ジージージー-, GGG-Jījījī-)	April 13, 2025	January 25, 2026	Junichi Kabuto		
Onishidō (鬼士道)	April 19, 2025	December 13, 2025	Wataru Studio		
Blue Proustian Moment (銀青のプルースト, Ginao no Purūsuto)	April 26, 2025	November 8, 2025	Emofuu		
Kininaru Kurumi-san! (気になる来見さん！)	May 1, 2025	present	Kusunoki Shō		
Magical Girl and Narco Wars (魔法少女と麻薬戦争, Mahō Shōjo to Mayaku Sensō)	May 6, 2025	July 21, 2026	Yu Nomiya, Meijimerou		
Gunze Arabaki's Magnificently Maniacal Menagerie! (あらばけ！荒吐グングンパーク, Arabake! Arabaki Gungun Park)	May 9, 2025	present	Kyosuke Usuta		
Hell Teacher: Jigoku Sensei Nube Plus (地獄先生ぬ～べ～PLUS, Jigoku Sensei Nūbē PLUS)	May 14, 2025	June 25, 2025	Shō Makura, Takeshi Okano		
Aliens, Baseball, and Civilization (野球・文明・エイリアン, Yakyū Bunmei Eirian)	May 17, 2025	February 28, 2026	Teito Heji, Sai Yamagishi		
The God of Time (時間の神様, Jikan no Kamisama)	May 22, 2025	August 28, 2025	Kanae Nakanishi, Tsukasa Furokawa		
Blood Wing Hunter (血翼の猟人, Chi Tsubasa no Ryōjin)	May 30, 2025	January 30, 2026	Ryuji Kunimoto		
Kōkishin wa Maō o Korosu (好奇心は魔王を殺す)	June 17, 2025	December 9, 2025	Aigome		
Class of Brains (群脳教室, Gun nō Kyōshitsu)	June 18, 2025	present	Kenji Ishima		
Re/Member: The Last Night (カラダ探し THE LAST NIGHT, Karadasagashi THE LAST NIGHT)	July 1, 2025	January 27, 2026	Welzard, Katsutoshi Murase, Harumi Doki, Yuki Hara		
Young Gun Boarder's (ヤングガン ボーダーズ)	July 25, 2025	February 20, 2026	MUSASHI		
Ai to Ningyo Hime (愛と人魚姫)	August 13, 2025	May 13, 2026	Gizaneko		
Kurumizawa's Folly (来見沢善彦の愚行, Kurumizawa Yoshihiko no Guko)	September 6, 2025	present	Tokiwa Yohira		
Care for Something Sweet? (一旦カフェにしませんか？, Ittan Cafe ni Simasenka?)	September 28, 2025	July 26, 2026	mato		
The Bateren Tales (伴天連怪談, Bateren Kaidan)	October 3, 2025	November 20, 2026	Yu Miki		
Konbini Fantasia Maōjōchuten (コンビニふぁんたじあ～魔王城中店～)	October 6, 2025	present	ZUNDLE		
Assassination Hospital (アサシネーションホスピタル)	October 18, 2025	May 30, 2026	Kei Akagi		
WITCHRIV	October 23, 2025	present	Hakuri		
Money Forest (金のなる森, Kane no Naru Mori)	November 3, 2025	July 20, 2026	Kyohei Tawara		
Delinquent Gacha (ガチャンキイ, Gachankii)	November 11, 2025	June 30, 2026	Hiroshi Shimomoto		
Life-Man (生活マン, Seikatsuman)	November 22, 2025	September 19, 2026	Nanda Tou, Ayaki		
Hatori and Furuta's Extraordinarily Ordinary Life (羽鳥と古田の非日常茶飯事, Hatori to Furuta no Hi Nichijochahanji)	December 13, 2025	present	Daijirou Nonoue		
.A -dot Alice- (.A-ドットアリス-)	December 16, 2025	present	Takuya Nishio		
Shunrai Table Tennis (春雷卓球, Shunrai Takkyū)	December 26, 2025	present	Masahiro Hirakata		
Island Rock (島ロック, Shima Rock)	December 30, 2025	present	Manose, Miharu		

=== 2026 ===
Manga	First Chapter	Final Chapter	Manga artist		
Manga	Love Through a Prism (プリズム輪舞曲, Prism Rondo)	January 8, 2026 (Note: in parallel with Manga Mee)	Manga artist	present	Yoko Kamio, Maki Minami
The Trembling Right Hand (震える右手, Furueru Migite)	January 14, 2026	May 13, 2026	Riki Someya, Toyotaka Haneda		
Smiley & Lively☆Your Girl Happy (にこにこ元気☆ハッピーちゃん, Nikoniko Genki ☆ Happī-chan)	January 23, 2026	present	Nosuke Inujima		
Manaka the Human and the Slaughter Robot (殺戮ロボと人のマナカ, Satsuriku Robo to Hito no Manaka)	January 27, 2026	April 21, 2026	Nao Iori		
West Tokyo Metal Bros (ニシトーキョーメタルブラザーズ, Nishi Tōkyō Metaru Burazāzu)	February 7, 2026	September 5, 2026	Nobuko Sesawa		
The Struggle Is Real with Giriko Kirigiri! (限界OL霧切ギリ子, Genkai OL Kirigiri Giriko)	February 17, 2026	present	Mītosupa Tsuchimoto		
ROAD☆STAR (ドーロ☆スター, Dōro Sutā)	February 24, 2026	present	Katsunori Hana		
Mizunoke: A Modern Tale of Mysterious Water Dwellers (水ノ怪-水域怪異奇譚今様-, Mizu no Kai: Suiiki Kaii Kitan Imayō)	March 8, 2026	October 11, 2026	Yamauta		
Blobtopia (ブヨトピア, Buyotopia)	March 13, 2026	present	Jun Kirarazaka		
The Oracles of Kami (神ヨムふたり, Kami Yomu Futari)	March 19, 2026	present	Fibi Dori		
Moshne Project (モシュネプロジェクト, Moshune Purojekuto)	March 21, 2026	July 25, 2026	Yuuto Saezu		
Axed Mangaka and Doujin Creator (打ち切られ漫画家と同人女, Uchikirare Mangakka to Doujin Onna)	March 30, 2026	present	Hibito Sumi		
Subaru the Invincible (無敵のスバル, Muteki no Subaru)	April 12, 2026	present	Nariaki Narita		
The Chrysalis Heart (サナギの心臓, Sanagi no Shinzō)	April 17, 2026	present	Akari Kajimoto		
Hitoner (ヒトナー, Hitonā)	April 22, 2026	present	Tomohiro Yagi		
SATANICA	May 9, 2026	present	Kuroha		
World Wide Web MIKO! (世界を繋ぎ尽くすインターネット巫女, Sekai wo Tsunagi Tsukusu Intānetto Miko)	May 29, 2026	present	Kogattuo, Ichika Kino		
Lunolita (ルノリータ, Runorīta)	May 31, 2026	present	Kinoshi Wata		
Hey! Devil Girl! (あっ、悪魔ちゃん, A, Akuma-chan)	June 6, 2026	present	Zao Fukatsu		
Twilight Blade (あわいの焔刃, Awai no Enjin)	June 10, 2026	present	Chiyoko Maruume, Tokegoro		
A Questionnaire on the Mouth (口に関するアンケート, Kuchi ni Kansuru Ankēto)	July 4, 2026	July 25, 2026	Sesuji, Shuzo Oshimi		
MikotoHako (みことはこ)	August 4, 2026	present	Shintaro Tengan		
Finding the Invisible Star (七等星をみつけて, Nanatōsei o Mitsukete)	August 6, 2026	present	Sango Honda		
Mayori Academy (魔寄りの学校, Mayori no Gakko)	August 17, 2026	present	Tatsu Murakoshi		
KAKAKAKA (科科科科)	August 26, 2026	present	Mukade Makino		
Noisering (ノイズリング, Noizuringu)	September 1, 2026	present	Kanya Aku, Tsubasa		
Ayaru’s Brush with Romance (イッピツアヤル, Ippitsuayaru)	September 13, 2026	present	Hidari Yokoyama		
Evangeline Puts on Shoes (エヴァンジェリンは靴を履く, Evangeline wa Kutsu o Haku)	September 16, 2026	present	Ryosuke Asakura		
Slap Shot Girls (スラップショットガールズ, Surappushotto gārusu)	September 29, 2026	present	Alpa		
Noro-Noro Puku-Puku (のろのろぷくぷく)	October 5, 2026	present	Chanta		
The Pit of Darkness (闇捨て穴, Yami Sute Ana)	October 24, 2026	present	Sora Karin, Kentaro Harada		
Nightmare of Oveja Negra (オヴェハネグラ号の悪夢, Ovu~ehanegura-gō no akumu)	October 28, 2026	present	Shota Kono		
Evershifting Girlfriends (うつろうカノジョたち, Utsurou Kanojo-tachi)	October 30, 2026	present	Omameda		
Bartlet Fairy Basslet (パートレット・フェアリー・バスレッ, Pātoretto fearī basure~tsu)	November 2, 2026	present	Norihiro Yagi		
Phantasma Lily (ファンタズマリリィ, Fantazuma Riryi)	November 15, 2026	present	Nogomi Okayama, Kudori Sawakita		
Legend of the Harem Hero (ハーレム勇者伝説, Harem Yuusha Densetsu)	November 21, 2026	present	Natsuna Tsunatsu, Toshihiro Chigusa		
