= M×0 =

Japanese manga series

- First tankōbon volume cover, featuring Taiga Kuzumi (front) and Aika Hiiragi (back)

エム×ゼロ (Emu × Zero)
- Genre: Action; Comedy; Fantasy
- Manga
- Written by: Yasuhiro Kanō
- Published by: Shueisha
- Imprint: Jump Comics
- Magazine: Weekly Shōnen Jump
- Original run: May 8, 2006 – May 19, 2008
- Volumes: 10
- icon

M×0 (エム×ゼロ, Emu × Zero) is a Japanese manga series written and illustrated by Yasuhiro Kanō. It was serialized in Shueisha's shōnen manga magazine Weekly Shōnen Jump from May 2006 to May 2008, with its chapters collected in ten tankōbon volumes. It tells the story about a school that teaches students how to do magic and the crazy antics of a normal boy who was admitted under special circumstances.

== Plot ==
Taiga Kuzumi, a physically capable but temperamental youth, attends an entrance interview for Seinagi Private High School (私立聖凪高校, Shiritsu Seinagi Kōkō). When asked about hypothetical magical abilities, his response of "Conquer the world" provokes laughter from a female observer. Though she later apologizes tearfully, Taiga fails the admission process and blames her interference.

While attempting to confront this girl at the school, staff mistake Taiga for a truant student and pull him through the institution's magical barrier. This unintentional entry exposes Seinagi's true purpose as an academy for magic education. Initial exposure to magical phenomena causes severe disorientation, leading to escape attempts that heighten faculty suspicions.

After physically subduing a staff member and encountering hostile upperclassmen, Taiga discovers the interview girl among the student body. His objectives shift from survival to romantic pursuit. Despite strict enrollment policies, administrators grant him admission under unique conditions - complete lack of magical capability. Taiga must now maintain the pretense of magical proficiency while navigating academic life surrounded by actual practitioners.

== Characters ==
Taiga Kuzumi (九澄大賀, Kuzumi Taiga)
Taiga, a strong-willed and skilled fighter, is mistakenly taken to a magic high school after failing to enroll elsewhere. Though initially unable to use magic without a proper plate—a spell-storing device—many students believe his abilities are exceptional. During a bullying incident, he loses his temporary plate and must make a wish to avoid expulsion. He wishes to grant Aika Hiiragi’s desire to see her late mother. After verifying his sincerity with a truth spell, the principal grants him his own plate, The M0.
Aika Hiiragi (柊愛花, Hiiragi Aika)
Aika is a mage-in-training at Seinagi Private High School, where her father teaches magic. Known for her loud, unrestrained laughter and forgiving nature, she rarely holds grudges. Despite her kindness, she is naturally clumsy, often struggling with spellcasting. Her magic specializes in invisibility, object manipulation, and "voice warp"—a powerful sound-based ability considered dangerous by others, though its daily applications are limited. Having attended all-girl schools before, she is new to co-ed education. Her deepest wish is to see her late mother, though the required magic is immensely powerful. Initially at odds with Taiga, she eventually warms to him and appears to develop romantic feelings.
Kenjirō Hiiragi (柊 賢二郎, Hiiragi Kenjirō)
Kenjirō, a 37-year-old widower, serves as chairman of magical arts at Seinagi High School and is Aika's father. Respected and feared by students for his formidable magical prowess—second only to the principal—he maintains strict authority. After Taiga discovers the school's existence, Kenjirō ensures his enrollment to preserve secrecy. Highly protective of his daughter, he remains wary of Taiga's presence in her class.

== Publication ==
Written and illustrated by Yasuhiro Kanō, M×0 was serialized in Shueisha's shōnen manga magazine Weekly Shōnen Jump between May 8, 2006, and May 19, 2008. Its 99 individual chapters were collected in ten tankōbon volumes published between November 2, 2006, and August 4, 2008.

=== Volumes ===
No.	Title	Japanese release date	Japanese ISBN
1	Magic School!? Mahō gakkō!? (魔法学校!?)	November 2, 2006	978-4-08-874277-9
M:1. "Magic School!?" (魔法学校!?, "Mahō gakkō!?"); M:2. "Kuzumi Taiga is Taiga Kuzumi?" (クズミタイガはタイガクズミ?, "Kuzumi Taiga wa Taiga Kuzumi"); M:3. "School Life Start!?" (学園生活スタート!?, "Gakuen seikatsu SUTĀTO!?"); M:4. "Escape!?" (脱出!?, "Dasshutsu!?"); M:5. "Party Formation!?" (パーティ結成!?, "Pati Kessei!?"); M:6. "Those Two are Siblings!?" (二人は兄弟!?, "Futari wa kyōdai?"); M:7. "Third Period: Magic Practice Class (Outside)" (3時間目·魔法実習授業(屋外), "San jikanme, mahō jisshū jugyō (okugai)")
2	The Student Council Magic Executive Committee; Seitokai mahō shikkōbu (生徒会魔法執行部)	March 2, 2007	978-4-08-874321-9
M:8. "Where is the Plate!? 1" (プレートよどこへ!?①, "PURĒTO yo doko e!? ichi"); M:9. "Where is the Plate!? 2" (プレートよどこへ!?②, "PURĒTO yo doko e!? ni"); M:10. "Where is the Plate!? 3" (プレートよどこへ!?③, "PURĒTO yo doko e!? san"); M:11. "Unexpected Meeting" (予期せぬお迎え, "Yokisenu omukae"); M:12. "The Student Council Magic Executive Committee" (生徒会魔法執行部, "Seitokai mahō shikkōbu"); M:13. "Discord" (確執, "Kakushitsu"); M:14. "Confrontation" (対決, "Taiketsu"); M:15. "The Two at That Time" (あの頃の二人, "Ano koro no futari"); M:16. "Ise's Willpower" (伊勢の意地, "Ise no iji"); M:17. "Temporary Compromise" (一時の和解, "Ichiji no wakai")
3	Magic Examination; Mahō shiken (魔法試験)	May 2, 2007	978-4-08-874344-8
M:18. "M0 Plate" (M0プレート, "EMU ZERO PURĒTO"); M:19. "Magic Exam 1" (魔法試験①, "Mahō shiken ichi"); M:20. "Magic Exam 2" (魔法試験②, "Mahō shiken ni"); M:21. "Magic Exam 3" (魔法試験③, "Mahō shiken san"); M:22. "Magic Exam 4" (魔法試験④, "Mahō shiken yon"); M:23. "Magic Exam 5" (魔法試験⑤, "Mahō shiken go"); M:24. "Magic Exam 6" (魔法試験⑥, "Mahō shiken roku"); M:25. "Magic Exam 7" (魔法試験⑦, "Mahō shiken nana"); M:26. "Magic Exam, LAST" (魔法試験LAST, "Mahō shiken RASUTO"); M:27. "Magic Department Ban Lifted" (魔法部解禁, "Mahō-bu kaikin"); Omake. "A Morning at Seinagi High" (聖凪高の朝, "Seinagi-kō no Asa")
4	Kuzumi Taiga's Exploration Group; Kuzumi Taiga tanken (九澄大賀探険隊)	July 4, 2007	978-4-08-874386-8
M:28. "Kuzumi Taiga's Exploration Group" (九澄大賀探険隊, "Kuzumi Taiga tanken"); M:29. "A Suspicious Cave" (妖しい洞窟, "Ayashī dōkutsu"); M:30. "Devil Flower" (魔の花, "Ma no hana"); M:31. "It's Painful to Be a Man" (男はツライよ, "Otoko wa tsurai yo"); M:32. "End of the Exploration" (探険修了, "Tanken shūryō"); M:33. "Lucy Has Her Own Pace" (ルーシーはマイペース, "Rūshī wa MY PĒSU"); M:34. "Provocation" (挑発, "Chōhatsu"); M:35. "mosaic panic" (mosaic panic, "mozaiku panikku"); M:36. "Class Match 1" (クラスマッチ①, "KURASU MACCHI ichi"); M:37. "Class Match 2" (クラスマッチ②, "KURASU MACCHI ni")
5	Class Match; KURASU MACCHI (クラスマッチ)	September 4, 2007	978-4-08-874415-5
M:38. "Class Match 3" (クラスマッチ③, "KURASU MACCHI san"); M:39. "Class Match 4" (クラスマッチ④, "KURASU MACCHI yon"); M:40. "Class Match (intermission)" (クラスマッチ(インターミッション), "KURASU MACCHI (intaamisshon)"); M:41. "Class Match 5" (クラスマッチ⑤, "KURASU MACCHI go"); M:42. "Class Match 6" (クラスマッチ⑥, "KURASU MACCHI roku"); M:43. "Class Match 7" (クラスマッチ⑦, "KURASU MACCHI nana"); M:44. "Class Match 8" (クラスマッチ⑧, "KURASU MACCHI hachi"); M:45. "Class Match 9" (クラスマッチ⑨, "KURASU MACCHI kyū"); M:46. "Class Match 10" (クラスマッチ⑩, "KURASU MACCHI jū"); M:47. "Class Match 11" (クラスマッチ⑪, "KURASU MACCHI jū-ichi"); Omake. "Special Lesson at Seinagi High" (聖凪高の特別授業, "Seinagi-kō no tokubetsu jugyō")
6	Back To The Starting Point; Futaridashi ni modoru (ふりだしに戻る)	November 2, 2007	978-4-08-874436-0
M:48. "Class Match 12" (クラスマッチ⑫, "KURASU MACCHI jū-ni"); M:49. "Class Match 13" (クラスマッチ⑬, "KURASU MACCHI jū-san"); M:50. "Class Match 14" (クラスマッチ⑭, "KURASU MACCHI jū-yon"); M:51. "Class Match 15" (クラスマッチ⑮, "KURASU MACCHI jū-go"); M:52. "Class Match epilogue" (クラスマッチ epilogue, "KURASU MACCHI epirōgu"); M:53. "Back To The Starting Point" (ふりだしに戻る①, "Futaridashi ni modoru ichi"); M:54. "Back To The Starting Point" (ふりだしに戻る②, "Futaridashi ni modoru ni"); M:55. "Back To The Starting Point" (ふりだしに戻る③, "Futaridashi ni modoru san"); M:56. "Back To The Starting Point" (ふりだしに戻る④, "Futaridashi ni modoru yon"); M:57. "Back To The Starting Point" (ふりだしに戻る⑤, "Futaridashi ni modoru go")
7	M0, A Road of Thorns; EMU ZERO ibara no michi (M0荊の道)	January 4, 2008	978-4-08-874468-1
M:58. "Kuzumi Kokuha is Kokuha Kuzumi" (クズミコクハはコクハクズミ, "Kuzumi Kokuha wa Kokuha Kuzumi"); M:59. "Skateboard-kun and Glasses-chan" (スケボー君とメガネちゃん, "SUKEBŌ-kun to Megane-chan"); M:60. "Summer Oasis (first part)" (夏のオアシス(前編), "Natsu no OASHISU (zenpen)"); M:61. "Summer Oasis (last part)" (夏のオアシス(後編), "Natsu no OASHISU (kōhen)"); M:62. "M0, A Road of Thorns" (M0荊の道, "EMU ZERO ibara no michi"); M:63. "M0 Fire" (M0ファイヤー, "EMU ZERO FAIYĀ"); M:64. "M0, A New Journey" (M0新たなる旅立ち, "EMU ZERO arata naru tabidachi"); M:65. "M0 Fight!" (M0ファイト!, "EMU ZERO FAITO!"); M:66. "The Way to Erase Magic" (魔法の消し方, "Mahō no keshi kata"); M:67. "Second Term Starts" (二学期始動, "Ni gakki shidō")
8	The Targeted Culture Festival; Nerawareta bunkasai (ねらわれた文化祭)	March 4, 2008	978-4-08-874487-2
M:68. "The Man Called Kuzumi" (九澄という男, "Kuzumi to iu otoko"); M:69. "M0's True Form!?" (M0の正体!?, "EMU ZERO no shōtai!?"); M:70. "The Annex of The Two (?)" (2人(?)の分室, "Futari (?) no bunshitsu"); M:71. "The Targeted Culture Festival 1" (ねらわれた文化祭①, "Nerawareta bunkasai ichi"); M:72. "The Targeted Culture Festival 2" (ねらわれた文化祭②, "Nerawareta bunkasai ni"); M:73. "The Targeted Culture Festival 3" (ねらわれた文化祭③, "Nerawareta bunkasai san"); M:74. "The Targeted Culture Festival 4" (ねらわれた文化祭④, "Nerawareta bunkasai yon"); M:75. "The Targeted Culture Festival 5" (ねらわれた文化祭⑤, "Nerawareta bunkasai go"); M:76. "The Targeted Culture Festival 6" (ねらわれた文化祭⑥, "Nerawareta bunkasai roku"); M:77. "The Targeted Culture Festival 7" (ねらわれた文化祭⑦, "Nerawareta bunkasai nana"); Omake. "Kuzumi Kokuha Is The 19-Year-Old, 132 cm Tall, Absurdly Strong Sister of Kuzumi Taiga Chapter" (九澄胡玖葉は19歳で身長132cmでメチャ^{2}強くて九澄大賀のお姉ちゃん...の巻, "Kuzumi Kokuha wa 19-sai de shinchō 132 cm de mechamecha tsuyokute Kuzumi Taiga no onē-chan... no maki")
9	Second Magic Exam; Mahō shiken Sekando (魔法試験2nd)	June 4, 2008	978-4-08-874513-8
M:78. "The Targeted Culture Festival 8" (ねらわれた文化祭⑧, "Nerawareta bunkasai hachi"); M:79. "The Targeted Culture Festival 9" (ねらわれた文化祭⑨, "Nerawareta bunkasai kyū"); M:80. "Missing Lucy, first part" (消えたルーシー·前編, "Kieta RŪSHĪ, zenpen"); M:81. "Missing Lucy, last part" (消えたルーシー·後編, "Kieta RŪSHĪ, kōhen"); M:82. "Class 1-C's Gothic Lolita Tea House" (1年C組ゴスロリ喫茶, "Ichinen C-kumi GOSURORI kissa"); M:83. "Second Magic Exam 1" (魔法試験2nd①, "Mahō shiken 2nd ichi"); M:84. "Second Magic Exam 2" (魔法試験2nd②, "Mahō shiken Sekando ni"); M:85. "Second Magic Exam 3" (魔法試験2nd③, "Mahō shiken Sekando san"); M:86. "Second Magic Exam 4" (魔法試験2nd④, "Mahō shiken Sekando yon"); M:87. "Second Magic Exam 5" (魔法試験2nd⑤, "Mahō shiken Sekando go"); Omake. "Magic is Wonderful Chapter" (魔法はワンダフル...の巻, "Mahō ha Wandafuru... no maki")
10	Farewell Seinagi; Saraba Seinagi (さらば聖凪)	August 4, 2008	978-4-08-874554-1
M:88. "Black Plate" (黒いプレート, "Kuroi PURĒTO"); M:89. "Level 1" (レベル1, "REBERU WAN"); M:90. "Tall Wall" (高い壁, "Takai kabe"); M:91. "Far-away Goal" (遠いゴール, "Tōi GŌRU"); M:92. "Revenge, Level 1" (リベンジ·レベル1, "REBENJI, REBERU WAN"); M:93. "The New Plate Is BM0" (新プレートはBM0, "Shin PURĒTO wa BM0"); M:94. "Magic Debut!?" (魔法デビュー!?, "Mahō DEBYŪ!?"); M:95. "10(+2)Pudding (10(+2)Pudding", "jū(Purasu Ni)Purin"); M:96. "The Secret Couple" (秘密の2人, "Himitsu no futari"); M:97. "Farewell Seinagi 1" (さらば聖凪①, "Saraba Seinagi ichi"); M:98. "Farewell Seinagi 2" (さらば聖凪②, "Saraba Seinagi ni"); M:99. "Farewell Seinagi 3" (さらば聖凪③, "Saraba Seinagi san")
