= Futari Escape =

Japanese manga series

- First tankōbon volume cover

ふたりエスケープ (Futari Esukēpu)
- Genre: Romantic comedy; Slice of life; Yuri
- Manga
- Written by: Shōichi Taguchi
- Published by: Ichijinsha
- English publisher: NA: Seven Seas Entertainment
- Magazine: Comic Yuri Hime
- Original run: July 18, 2020 – December 16, 2022
- Volumes: 4
- Television drama
- Directed by: Kahori Higashi
- Produced by: Hiroki Yamamoto (chief); Miyuki Sasagi; Seiya Horio
- Written by: Kahori Higashi; Mari Kawada
- Studio: United Productions
- Original network: TV Osaka, TV Aichi
- Original run: October 5, 2025 – December 7, 2025
- Episodes: 10

Futari Escape (ふたりエスケープ, Futari Esukēpu) is a Japanese yuri manga written and illustrated by Shōichi Taguchi. It was serialized in Ichijinsha's Comic Yuri Hime from July 2020 to December 2022, and is licensed for an English-language release by Seven Seas Entertainment. A live-action television drama adaptation aired from October to December 2025.

== Plot ==
The series follows two young female roommates, one an unemployed slacker and the other a stressed-out manga artist, who attempt to get away from the burdens of adult life. The pair, known as Senpai and Kouhai respectively, spend their days relaxing together, whether they are spending money on epic meals or going on day excursions instead of getting work done.

== Characters ==
Senpai (先輩)
Portrayed by: Renka Iwamoto
Kouhai (後輩, Kōhai)
Portrayed by: Nao Tomisato

== Media ==
=== Manga ===
Written and illustrated by Shōichi Taguchi, Futari Escape was serialized in Ichijinsha's Comic Yuri Hime from July 18, 2020, to December 16, 2022. The series was collected in four tankōbon volumes from November 2020 to February 2023.

The series is licensed for an English release in North America by Seven Seas Entertainment.

No.	Original release date	Original ISBN	English release date	English ISBN
1	November 18, 2020	978-4-75802-182-1	November 15, 2022	978-1-63858-568-8
2	March 17, 2021	978-4-75802-226-2	February 21, 2023	978-1-63858-569-5
3	December 18, 2021	978-4-75802-317-7	June 6, 2023	978-1-68579-565-8
4	February 16, 2023	978-4-75802-498-3	December 26, 2023	979-8-88843-090-3

=== Drama ===
A live-action television drama adaptation was announced on September 1, 2025. The series will be directed by Kahori Higashi, with Higashi writing scripts alongside Mari Kawada, Hiroki Yamamoto serving as chief producer, Miyuki Sasagi and Seiya Horio serving as producers, and stars Nogizaka46 members Renka Iwamoto and Nao Tomisato as the two leads. It aired on TV Osaka and TV Aichi from October 5 to December 7, 2025. The opening theme song, "Futari de Hitotsu" (The Two of Us Are One), is performed by Kentarō Seino.

== Reception ==
The series was nominated for the 2021 and 2022 Next Manga Award in the print manga category, and was ranked 19th in both editions.

== See also ==
- Three Days of Happiness, A novel, whose manga adaptation is also illustrated by Shōichi Taguchi
