= Pretty Face =

Japanese manga series by Yasuhiro Kanō

- First tankōbon volume cover

プリティフェイス (Puriti Feisu)
- Genre: Romantic comedy
- Manga
- Written by: Yasuhiro Kanō
- Published by: Shueisha
- English publisher: NA: Viz Media
- Imprint: Jump Comics
- Magazine: Weekly Shōnen Jump
- Original run: May 14, 2002 – June 9, 2003
- Volumes: 6
- icon

Pretty Face (Japanese: プリティフェイス, Hepburn: Puriti Feisu) is a Japanese manga series written and illustrated by Yasuhiro Kano. It was serialized in Shueisha's shōnen manga magazine Weekly Shōnen Jump from May 2002 to June 2003, with its chapters collected in six tankōbon volumes. The story revolves around a high school boy who suffers an accident and having his face reconstructed in the form of his crush, attempts to impersonate a girl whom his crush mistakes for her twin sister. In North America, the manga was licensed for English release by Viz Media.

== Plot ==
Masashi Rando is a high school student and karate expert who harbors an unconfessed love for a fellow student, Rina Kurimi. One day, while returning home from a karate tournament in Hokkaidō, he is involved in a tragic school bus accident and burned beyond recognition.

One year later, Masashi awakes from a coma to find that he has been in the care of a talented (yet slightly deranged) surgeon named Jun Manabe. Masashi finds out his disfigured face had been reconstructed in the image of the girl he has a crush on. Not knowing what Masashi originally looked like, Dr. Manabe used a photo in Masashi's pocket as the model for his reconstructive surgery.

Afterwards, Masashi finds out that during his year long coma, he was mistakenly pronounced deceased, his parents moved away, and even his house was demolished. Once he has realized his old life is now gone, he breaks down in complete despair on the sidewalk in front of the empty lot that was his former household. On his way back to Manabe's clinic, he runs into Rina by chance, and is mistaken for her missing twin sister, Yuna. After Rina takes him back to her house and presents him as Yuna, he lies about having amnesia in order not to arouse any sudden suspicions. Masashi wants Jun to change his face back to the way it was but has no picture of himself to help. He does get a picture of himself eventually but later, after seeing how much pain Rina experienced during the time her sister was gone, Masashi decides to impersonate Yuna for the time being until he can find the real Yuna and bring her back to the Kurimi family.

== Characters ==
=== Main characters ===
Masashi Rando (乱堂 政, Randō Masashi)
The main character, he is a karate expert who is very arrogant because not many can defeat him. After a school bus accident, which horrifically disfigures him, his face is reconstructed to that of Rina Kurimi, a fellow student whom he feels an attraction towards. After waking from his year-long coma, he is mistaken by Rina for her missing identical twin sister Yuna (the only difference now being their hair color, with Rina's being black and "Yuna"'s being blonde due to its having changed color during his coma). In the end, despite much inner turmoil on what to do, Masashi decides to pose as Yuna until he is able to find the real Yuna.
At first, he has a lot of trouble acting like a typical female high school student, and his personality as Masashi comes out often with disastrous results. Even after being in a coma for a year, he is still incredibly strong which usually raises a lot of questions because of his small size. Often, as a running gag, he gets nosebleeds when he gets stimulated. However, as time goes on, he comes to discover a lot of things about being a female. Due to his vibrant personality and Rina's cute face, he gets many male (and one female) suitors in the school, something that does not exactly make him happy. Furthermore, one of his main fears is that he'll become accustomed to being Yuna for good. When it comes to matters involving Rina, however, he is often very selfless and only thinks about her happiness.
Rina Kurimi (栗見 理奈, Kurimi Rina)
She is the girl Masashi likes, and she liked him back before the accident, but she just never told him. She has a quiet personality and feels responsible for what happened to her real identical twin sister Yuna after Yuna ran away from home. Rina is a very emotional person and depends a lot on Masashi (as Yuna) for support and guidance.
She is a very intelligent person and the smartest in her class, but she seems to struggle when it comes to cooking. After Masashi came back as Yuna, Rina has become terrified that her sister will end up leaving her again and hangs out with her more often than not because of it, even trying to stay physically closer to "Yuna". She has noticed the change in "Yuna"'s personality, but likes it, even to the point of buying a wig that looks like "Yuna"'s hair and pretending to be Yuna for a day.
Yuna Kurimi (栗見 由奈, Kurimi Yuna)
Rina's real twin sister and the person Masashi impersonates. After an argument with her parents, who wanted her to attend the same high school as Rina, she ended up running away from home in order to fulfill her dream of becoming a beautician. After she left, she traveled to Otaru and started working in the Kaze hair salon owned by the Yoshida family. Additionally, she started living with them for the time being. During her time working at the salon, Yuna was described to be a very hard-worker. She is also very intelligent, much like Rina, though smarter than her younger sister. After the salon went out of business, she said she would go to a professional beautician school in Sapporo, but she later tells Masashi that she has been attending a beautician school in Tokyo. Although she was originally very angry with Masashi for pretending to be her and lying to Rina, his selflessness in sacrificing his own life and identity to make Rina happy makes a strong impression on her and she forgives him, entrusting Rina to his care (as Yuna) until she can complete her studies and return as herself.
Dr. Jun Manabe (真鍋 順, Manabe Jun)
He is the very talented doctor who reconstructed Masashi's face using a picture of Rina as a reference that he found on Masashi's charred body after the school bus accident. He is excessively perverted and constantly suggests that Masashi should get a complete sex reassignment surgery to become more feminine, much to the disgust and wrath of Masashi (which often has him end up on the receiving end of a very violent and graphic beating). He helps Masashi throughout the story even after the surgery and even seems to serve as his mentor. He runs a small clinic/private hospital close by the school and the Kurimi house.

=== Supporting characters ===
Yukie Sano (佐野 雪江, Sano Yukie)
She is the most mature of Rina's friends. Additionally, she is the only one who has a boyfriend (Reiji Nakama who is older than her and already attending a university). Much like Masashi, she can get mad very easily and gets out of control. Because of this, Masashi is very scared of her when she is like this. She does have a soft side however, she is rather creative and is one of the best at her studies.
Keiko Tsukamato (塚本 恵子, Tsukamoto Keiko)
She is one of Rina's best friends and questions the existence of the male human. However, she loves animals and has a vast collection of stuffed animals and a couple of pets to show for it. Despite her boyish haircut, she tends to have a very feminine personality—doing things that normal girls her age would consider fun. However, she is a bit of a tomboy, since she likes playing sports more than other girls.
Midori Akai (赤井 美都里, Akai Midori)
She seems to be the most outgoing of Rina's friends and never passes up the opportunity to flirt with guys. She tries very much to get a boyfriend up to being obsessed about it and is somewhat jealous of others due to the fact that she does not have one. She once commented that she is "kind of afraid of animals."
Takahiro Kinoshita (木ノ下 貴弘, Kinoshita Takahiro), Shiyūji Tamura (田村修二, Tamura Shiyūji) and Takuya Endō (遠藤拓也, Endō Takuya)
Three members of the karate club that were subordinates of Masashi. When Masashi came back to school as Yuna and destroyed the members of the karate club, they ended up choosing "her" as their unofficial leader, as Masashi has no intention of returning to the club while impersonating Yuna. They often cause trouble for Masashi, leading him to refer to the trio as "The Three Stooges."
Miwa Masuko (升子 美和, Masuko Miwa)
She is Rina's cousin who becomes the substitute teacher for Japanese at Rina's school. She apparently is very close with the real Yuna, which causes problems for Masashi. She seems to have a thing about getting to the bottom of things when it comes to a mystery, which led to her trying to investigate Masashi-as-Yuna when she first came back; however, she found out what this prying felt like when some former students at her former school began stalking her, and seeing Mashashi rescue Rina from the stalkers allayed her suspicions. Eventually, she is able to become a regular teacher at Seika high school, where Masashi and the others go to school.
Nozomi Ueda (植田 望, Ueda Nozomi)
She is a first year student who approached Masashi (as Yuna) wanting "Yuna" to be her 'big sister.' It is later found out however that she has a massive crush on her and does everything to be near her. She sees Yuna as a good role model for herself and has admired her for that. She seems to have a poor opinion about boys, once having commented that they are "dirty and ugly creatures." Nozomi's father runs a kendo dojo that Nozomi also trains (she is ranked as a 2-dan). In addition, she comes from a very rich family although that is from her mother's side. Much like Masashi who appears to be a normal high school girl, Nozomi is a good fighter and can be very intimidating because of this. She also seems to be very popular among the first year male students because of her cute looks.
Natsuo Kobayashi (小林 夏緒, Kobayashi Natsuo)
She is the grandchild of the monk from the temple the karate club goes to train at once a year. She was partly trained by Masashi when he was visiting the temple, though she is now more skilled. When she fights, she has the tendency to show her panties a lot. Apparently, she fell in love with Masashi during their training together. Eventually she transfers to Masashi's school even though at first she believes him to be dead like everyone else. After secretly listening in on a conversation between Masashi and Manabe, she learns the truth about the whole situation and becomes a threat for giving away the secret. However, after seeing Masashi's surprising selflessness, she decides to help him find Yuna and wholeheartedly expresses her joy at seeing Masashi alive. Natsuo is the only other person who knows of Masashi's secret and does tease him a bit with it to get him to notice her. This leads to a love triangle as Masashi is somewhat torn between Rina and Natsuo who both are in love with him.

=== Other characters ===
Masato Miki (美木 聖人, Miki Masato)
He is the student body president at Rina's school and also the most popular guy, especially among the female population. He has been described as smart, good at sports, and very well at his work as the student president. However, he is rather conceited about his status. Eventually, he takes a liking to Yuna (not knowing it is Masashi), much to Masashi's horror.
Jinnai
He is a technician who develops products to be used for models. Jinnai is the only employee of his company Jinnai Modeling Research and Development Co. Dr. Manabe knows him, and Jinnai makes products that Manabe uses for Masashi's situation.
Jin Yoshida
A young man living in Otaru who knows the real Yuna. His family used to own a hair salon called Kaze (風) (meaning Wind) and at the time, Yuna lived with them as she worked as one of the assistants in the salon. Incidentally, Jin ended up falling in love with Yuna while she stayed with them for a few months. Before he met Yuna, he had co-founded a gang called The Crimsons with a guy named Haga. Eventually, he got into some trouble with the police after stabbing someone in a fight, and the salon went out of business for this. Later, Jin left the Crimsons to become a beautician, but Haga saw this as a form of betrayal. Thus, they are now enemies.

== Publication ==
Written and illustrated by Yasuhiro Kanō, Pretty Face was serialized in Shueisha's shōnen manga magazine Weekly Shōnen Jump from May 14, 2002, (Note: It started in the magazine's 24th issue of 2002 (cover date May 27), released on May 14 of that same year.) to June 9, 2003. (Note: It finished in the magazine's 28th issue of 2003 (cover date June 23), released on June 9 of that same year.) Its chapters collected in six tankōbon volumes, released from October 4, 2002, to November 4, 2003.

In North America, the manga was licensed for English release by Viz Media. The volumes were published between August 7, 2007, and June 3, 2008. The manga was added to Viz Media's Shonen Jump online service in 2018.

=== Volumes ===
No.	Original release date	Original ISBN	English release date	English ISBN
1	October 4, 2002	978-4-08-873361-6	August 7, 2007	978-1-4215-1368-3
2	December 4, 2002	978-4-08-873350-0	October 2, 2007	978-1-4215-1369-0
3	February 4, 2003	978-4-08-873384-5	December 4, 2007	978-1-4215-1370-6
4	May 1, 2003	978-4-08-873423-1	February 5, 2008	978-1-4215-1547-2
5	August 4, 2003	978-4-08-873497-2	April 1, 2008	978-1-4215-1644-8
6	November 4, 2003	978-4-08-873526-9	June 3, 2008	978-1-4215-1645-5
