= Shinmai Fukei Kiruko-san =

Japanese manga series

- First tankōbon volume cover, featuring Kiruko Otonashi

新米婦警キルコさん
- Genre: Comedy
- Manga
- Written by: Masahiro Hirakata
- Published by: Shueisha
- Imprint: Jump Comics
- Magazine: Weekly Shōnen Jump
- Original run: November 19, 2012 – May 20, 2013
- Volumes: 3
- icon

Shinmai Fukei Kiruko-san (新米婦警キルコさん; "New Policewoman Kiruko") is a Japanese manga series written and illustrated by Masahiro Hirakata. It was serialized in Shueisha's Weekly Shōnen Jump from November 2012 to May 2013, with its chapters collected in three tankōbon volumes. The series focuses on the comedic adventures of Kiruko Otonashi and Haruki Anjō, two rookie policemen in the police station of the small rural town of Nagashima, and their chief, Kanjūrō Tsutsui.

== Plot ==
Haruki Anjō is a police officer stationed in the rural and uneventful town of Nagashima (ながしま), where he eagerly anticipates the arrival of his first subordinate. However, he is unprepared for the assignment of Kiruko Otonashi, a former mercenary with no prior law enforcement experience. A green-haired young woman lacking conventional social awareness, Otonashi demonstrates a consistent inability to perform even basic duties, frequently exacerbating situations through incompetence. Consequently, Anjō assumes the responsibility of training her as a competent officer while mitigating the collateral damage caused by her repeated failures.

== Characters ==
Kiruko Otonashi (音無 キルコ, Otonashi Kiruko)
Kiruko Otonashi serves as a police officer at the Nagashima police station, typically assigned to undesirable personnel. A former mercenary with extensive combat experience, she displays bright green hair and orange eyes, one concealed by an eyepatch. Her military background leads to disproportionate responses to routine situations, often advocating excessive solutions to minor problems. She routinely carries twin tonfa blades, employing them with lethal efficiency despite orders prohibiting their use. Demonstrating exceptional physical capabilities, she exhibits remarkable speed, strength, and apparent resistance to injury. While enthusiastic about police work, her actions frequently escalate situations unintentionally due to her unconventional approach.
Haruki Anjō (安城 春樹, Anjō Haruki)
Haruki Anjō is a Nagashima police officer transferred due to disciplinary issues. With reddish-brown hair and yellow eyes, he often shirks duties but serves as mentor to Kiruko Otonashi, bearing responsibility for her mistakes. Despite laziness and inappropriate behavior, his experience enables competent policing when motivated. While frequently facing pay deductions for Otonashi's errors, he demonstrates genuine professionalism during critical situations.
Kanjūrō Tsutsui (筒井 勘十郎, Tsutsui Kanjūrō)
The chief of Nagashima station. He has black hair and eyes, and is shown to be older than Haruki. He organizes events at the station, has good manners and has a frank and straightforward personality.

== Publication ==
Written and illustrated by Masahiro Hirakata, Shinmai Fukei Kiruko-san was serialized in Shueisha's Weekly Shōnen Jump from November 19, 2012, to May 20, 2013. Shueisha collected its 24 individual chapters in three tankōbon volumes published from March 4 to July 4, 2013.

=== Volumes ===
No.	Release date	ISBN
1	March 4, 2013	978-4-08-870720-4
2	May 4, 2013	978-4-08-870761-7
3	July 4, 2013	978-4-08-870771-6

== Reception ==
The series got a fan following after the series' first chapter release, with art community Pixiv having hundreds of pictures.

== See also ==
- Debby the Corsifa wa Makezugirai, another manga series by the same author
