= Otome no Teikoku =

Japanese manga series

- Cover of the first volume featuring Ayano Kujō (left) and Miyoshi Sakurai (right)

オトメの帝国 (Otome no Teikoku)
- Genre: Comedy, yuri
- Manga
- Written by: Torajirō Kishi
- Published by: Shueisha
- Imprint: Jump Comics
- Magazine: Business Jump; (June 30, 2010 – October 5, 2011); Grand Jump WEB; (November 16, 2011 – October 10, 2017); Shōnen Jump+; (November 22, 2017 – September 10, 2025)
- Original run: June 30, 2010 – September 10, 2025
- Volumes: 20
- icon

Otome no Teikoku (オトメの帝国; lit. 'Maidens' Empire') is a Japanese manga series written and illustrated by Torajirō Kishi. It was first published as a one-shot in the 54th issue of Business Jump Special Edition BJ Soul (Shueisha) on June 30, 2010, and began as a regular serialization in Business Jump (published by the same company) in issue 17, 2010. After Business Jump was discontinued in 2011, the manga was transferred to its successor, Grand Jump, and serialized on Grand Jump WEB until chapter 162. On October 11, 2017, the transfer to Shōnen Jump+ was announced on the Grand Jump official website, and the series were serialized there since chapter 163 (released on November 22, 2017) until its final chapter, number 307, released on September 10, 2025.

== Synopsis ==
The manga tells the story of Japanese female students and their lives outside of school and beyond, between laughter and friendships that will transform into something stronger.

== Characters ==
=== First year students ===
Mari Otosawa (音沢 茉莉, Otosawa Mari)
A member of the track and field club, with dark skin and reddish brown hair. She engages in SM play with Yū Asamine, being the submissive party. She is friends with Mahiru Ogi and Mahiro Ōshita, and adores her senior from her club, Ai Okayama.
Yū Asamine (麻峰 優, Asamine Yū)
Mari Otosawa's partner. She engages in SM play with Mari, being the dominant party. She gets jealous when Mari gets friendly with other girls.
Mahiru Ogi (小城 まひる, Ogi Mahiru) and Mahiro Ōshita (大下 まひろ, Ōshita Mahiro)
Two friends who are often mistaken as twins due to their similar hairstyles. They befriend Mari and Yū, although Yū is annoyed by them. Other students believe seeing them brings good luck, dubbing them the Mahi-Mahi Gods (まひまひ神様, Mahimahi-Kamisama).
Mariri (まりり)
A friendly member of the debate club. She likes her senior Mayuyu. In chapter 246, her family name is revealed to be Tonoyama (兎之山). She had a boyfriend, but she broke up with him.
Mio Ichinose (市ノ瀬 美緒, Ichinose Mio)
A member of the literature club. She likes her senior Shizuka Asami, and composes poems in her head when she gets excited about Shizuka. She eventually asks Shizuka on a date, but gets heartbroken after she catches Shizuka kissing Kaoru Yamada the day before the date. Mio and Shizuka talk about it the next day in the clubroom, and after breaking down in tears and making up, they start dating for real.
Mayu Hibiki (響木 繭, Hibiki Mayu)
A secretary in the Student Council. She is friends with her classmate Midori Aiba and fellow student council member Nao Sawano. She is very interested in romance and often talks about boys she's interested in. She admires Kaoru Yamada and dated her for a short while, breaking up due to Kaoru flirting with multiple girls.
Midori Aiba (藍葉 碧, Aiba Midori)
A member of the Manga Research Club, somewhat of a mascot for the club. She is friends with Mayu Hibiki. She is nicknamed Midoriri. She's confident in her work, but not that good of an artist, which her seniors in the club don't point out so as not to upset her. She has hidden big breasts, and when a senior in the Manga Club measured them, she said they were at least a D.
Nao Sawano (沢野 奈緒, Sawano Nao)
Vice president of the Student Council. She looks prim and proper, but has exhibitionist and voyeuristic tendencies she is usually too embarrassed to act on in public. In chapter 150, where she wears an adhesive bandage in place of her underwear, Saeko Onibi of the Manga Research Club sees it much to her embarrassment. Recent chapters imply she has a crush on Mayu.

=== Second year students ===
Miyoshi Sakurai (桜井 美好, Sakurai Miyoshi)
Voiced by: Hibiki Aoi (petit anime)
A member of the cheerleading club. She's cheerful, talkative and curious. She has long hair which she bleached blonde, and a gyaru look. She and Ayano Kujō have been friends since elementary school.
Ayano Kujō (桜井 美好, Kujō Ayano)
Voiced by: Chika Anzai (petit anime)
A cool beauty with long black hair. She is smart, and can speak English fairly well. She and Miyoshi have been friends since elementary school, but Ayano is in love with Miyoshi, which Miyoshi doesn't seem to notice. She is a member of the After School Club.
Chie Kamizono (神園 ちえ, Kamizono Chie)
Voiced by: Satomi Satō (petit anime)
A tomboyish blonde gyaru who speaks in Kansai dialect. She initially disliked Ai Okayama, but they became closer as they interacted, and eventually fell in love and started dating. She dislikes her large breasts, but became more confident due to Ai. Her hairstyle changes as the story progresses.
Ai Okayama (岡山 亜衣, Okayama Ai)
Voiced by: Mariya Ise (petit anime)
A member of the track and field club. Chie describes her as having a "lone wolf aura". She has a tomboyish personality but is also surprisingly pure and girlish. She has a complex about her small breasts. She is 172 cm tall and is popular with her juniors in her club. Chie nicknamed her "Ah-chan". She initially approached Chie due to wanting to know what it's like to have large breasts, but they became friends and eventually lovers. She gets jealous when other girls touch Chie.
Kanae Onoda (小野田 奏恵, Onoda Kanae)
The student council president. She is serious and studious, but also an airhead and a closet pervert. She was initially annoyed by her classmates messing around (although she would mimic them in her free time), but eventually befriends them. She initially disliked Haruka Nanasawa due to Haruka having better grades, but befriends her over time as well. She is also a member of the Brass Band, but she has never been seen participating in the club.
Haruka Nanasawa (菜々沢 遥, Nanasawa Haruka)
A member of the tennis club. She is pretty, has good grades, and is kind and intelligent. She falls in love with Kanae, and becomes somewhat possessive of her.
Michiru Hosokawa (細川 ミチル, Hosokawa Michiru)
A girl with a photography hobby who likes taking pictures of girls. Her usual model is Airi Mitahara, taking risqué photos of her. In one chapter, she helps Miyoshi and Ayano recreate a childhood photo.
Airi Mitahara (三田原 愛里, Mitahara Airi)
Nicknamed "Arii". She acts as a model for Michiru and is generally close to her. She is somewhat of a pervert and likes being looked at and photographed. She likes wearing bloomers and school swimsuits. She was trained in bowling by her grandfather, who is a professional bowler. Like Ayano, she is a member of the After School Club.
Honoka Yamada (山田 ほのか, Yamada Honoka)
Voiced by: Reina Ueda (petit anime)
A member of the Manga Research Club. She's a fujoshi and history nerd, and a doujin writer who specializes in BL involving historical figures, generally Sengoku Period leaders. She is the younger sister of Kaoru Yamada, and similarly tall, being over 180 cm. She has very long black hair and usually has dark circles in her eyes. She is good doing shoulder massages, due to her father, a carpenter, forcing her to massage him.
She was bullied by her classmates in elementary and middle school, due to which she's skeptical of friendships, and is confused by the straightforward Elisha.
Elisha Sommerset (エリーシャ・サマセット, Erīsha Samāsetto)
Voiced by: Sumire Uesaka (petit anime)
A transfer student from the United States. She is fluent in Japanese but often speaks broken Japanese. She has a nice body, an open-minded personality, and wear glasses. She likes manga and drawings, and befriends Honoka due to their similar interests. She is interested in US presidents, which combined with Honoka's interest in Sengoku leaders led to them writing manga about presidents and samurai meeting. She's attracted to Honoka and often invites Honoka to her house. She never noticed her stiff shoulders until Honoka massaged her.

== Media ==
No.	Release date	ISBN
1	March 18, 2011	978-4-08-879123-4
2	January 19, 2012	978-4-08-879229-3
3	September 19, 2012	978-4-08-879424-2
4	December 19, 2013	978-4-08-879725-0
5	December 19, 2013	978-4-08-879726-7
6	June 19, 2014	978-4-08-879863-9
7	December 19, 2014	978-4-08-890065-0
8	July 17, 2015	978-4-08-890216-6
9	February 19, 2016	978-4-08-890367-5
10	July 19, 2016	978-4-08-890473-3
11	February 17, 2017	978-4-08-890655-3
12	August 18, 2017	978-4-08-890735-2
13	June 4, 2018	978-4-08-891025-3
14	April 4, 2019	978-4-08-891279-0
15	May 13, 2020	978-4-08-891588-3
16	April 30, 2021	978-4-08-891875-4
17	May 2, 2022	978-4-08-891875-4
18	February 3, 2023	978-4-08-892502-8
19	July 4, 2024	978-4-08-893196-8
20	December 4, 2025	978-4-08-894114-1

In 2015, to commemorate the release of Volume 8, an animated promotional video was produced using original illustrations by Etsuko Sumimoto, the character designer for the anime Yurikuma Arashi. In 2016, a collaboration figure was released as part of The World of Isobelle Pascha, a line of girl figures produced and sold by ThreeA. The series was featured in all three installments (2016, 2017, and 2018) of Yuri Exhibition (Yuritenn), an event themed around "yuri" (girls' love) organized by Village Vanguard. These exhibitions included displays of reproduction artwork and the sale of exclusive merchandise.

Regarding its serialization, author Torajirō Kishi revealed on Twitter at the time of Volume 12's release that "depending on how Volume 12 sells, the series might end with Volume 13." He later stated that the large amount of support that tweet received led to the series being transferred to Shōnen Jump+. Before the transfer, all 162 chapters published up to that point were made available for free on Shōnen Jump+ in batches of three chapters at a time (with the first day offering up to 60 chapters). Following the initial release on October 17, 2017, the title appeared in Twitter's trending topics.

Episodes featuring the top three couples chosen in a pairing popularity poll were adapted into voice comics. Beginning April 30, 2021, these were released one episode at a time on the Jump Channel on YouTube.

== Merchandise ==
In 2016, Otome no Teikoku collaborated with Ashley Wood's female figure series THE WORLD OF ISOBELLE PASCHA to release seven figures of Mahiro, Mahiru, Chie, Ai, Miyoshi, Ayano and Mask-senpai through Good Smile.
