= Debby the Corsifa wa Makezugirai =

Japanese manga series

- First tankōbon volume cover

デビィ・ザ・コルシファは負けず嫌い (Debī za Korushifa wa Makezugirai)
- Genre: Comedy
- Manga
- Written by: Masahiro Hirakata
- Published by: Shueisha
- Imprint: Jump Comics+
- Magazine: Shōnen Jump+
- Original run: December 7, 2020 – March 25, 2024
- Volumes: 9
- icon

Debby the Corsifa wa Makezugirai (Japanese: デビィ・ザ・コルシファは負けず嫌い; "Debby the Corsifa Is Emulous") is a Japanese manga series written and illustrated by Masahiro Hirakata. It was originally a one-shot published in Shueisha's Jump Giga magazine in April 2020, before being serialized in the Shōnen Jump+ service from December 2020 to March 2024. The series has been compiled into nine tankōbon volumes.

== Premise ==
The series centers around the titular Debby the Corsifa, the strongest devil in history. Realizing that no demon can possibly match her in a fight, she decides to alleviate her boredom by traveling to Earth and killing some humans. Coming across high school student Sugo Rokurou, she explains that she wants nothing more but a challenge. Rokurou manages to persuade her into playing old maid, and Debby accepts – with the rule that if she wins, she will kill him. However, while playing Rokurou realizes something astounding – while Debby is incredibly strong, she is a borderline idiot when it comes to anything else!

== Characters ==
Debby the Corsifa (デビィ・ザ・コルシファ, Debī za Korushifa)
Voiced by: Kana Motomiya (voice comic), Chihiro Sunou (anime PV)
Rokuro Sugo (凄 六郎, Sugo Rokurō)
Voiced by: Sōru Saitō
Raise yu Risky (レイズ・ユ・リスキィ, Reizu yu Risukī)
Diablo Star Meltypudding (ディアブロ・スター・メルティプリン, Diaburo Sutā Merutipurin)
Hellmes the Autumn (エルメス・ジ・オータム, Erumesu ji Ōtamu)
Shadowo tto Shark (シャドォ・ット・シャーク, Shadō tto Shāku)
May de Squeen (メイ・ド・スクィーン, Mei do Sukuīn)
Hanako ya Mada (ハナコ・ヤ・マーダ, Hanako ya Māda)
Nene the Corsifa (ネネ・ザ・コルシファ, Nene za Korushifa)
Satan the Corsifa (サタン・ザ・コルシファ, Satan za Korushifa)
Xiao Ru Fang (シャオ・ルー・ファング, Shao Rū Fangu)
Gold Knee Quebacca (ゴルド・ニー・キューバッカ, Gorudo Nī Kyūbakka)
Bianca yu Risky (ビアンカ・ユ・リスキィ, Bianca yu Risukī)
Temari Mochizuki (望月 てまり, Mochizuki Temari)
Rui Tamada (球田 塁, Tamada Rui)

== Media ==
=== Manga ===
Written and illustrated by Masahiro Hirakata, Debby the Corsifa wa Makezugirai was initially a one-shot published in Shueisha's Jump Giga magazine on April 30, 2020. It was serialized in the Shōnen Jump+ service from December 7, 2020, to March 25, 2024. Shueisha published nine tankōbon volumes from April 2021 to May 2024.

==== Volumes ====
No.	Japanese release date	Japanese ISBN
1	April 30, 2021	978-4-08-882659-2
2	September 3, 2021	978-4-08-882768-1
3	January 4, 2022	978-4-08-882895-4
4	May 2, 2022	978-4-08-883106-0
5	October 4, 2022	978-4-08-883278-4
6	March 3, 2023	978-4-08-883418-4
7	September 4, 2023	978-4-08-883654-6
8	February 2, 2024	978-4-08-883874-8
9	May 2, 2024	978-4-08-884070-3

=== Other ===
A voice comic adaptation of the first chapter was released, featuring Kana Motomiya as the voice of Debby the Corsifa and Sōru Saitō as the voice of Rokuro Sugo. In June 2022, a promotional anime commercial produced by Studio Pierrot was released, featuring scenes from the manga's first three chapters.

== Reception ==
In 2022, the series was nominated in the Next Manga Awards in the Web Manga category, and ranked 15th out of 50 nominees.

Tamagomago of Comicspace found the series fun, and described Debby and her personality as endearing and "full of charm."

== See also ==
- Shinmai Fukei Kiruko-san, another manga series by the same author
