= The Birds of Death =

Japanese manga series

- First volume cover

死ノ鳥 (Shi no Tori)
- Genre: Horror
- Manga
- Written by: Dr. Im
- Published by: Shueisha
- Imprint: Jump Comics+
- Magazine: Shōnen Jump+
- Original run: April 25, 2018 – March 3, 2019
- Volumes: 3
- icon

The Birds of Death (Japanese: 死ノ鳥, Hepburn: Shi no Tori) is a Japanese manga series written and illustrated by Dr. Im. It was serialized on Shueisha's Shōnen Jump+ online platform from April 2018 to March 2019, with its chapters collected in three tankōbon volumes.

== Publication ==
Written and illustrated by Dr. Im, The Birds of Death was serialized on Shueisha's Shōnen Jump+ online platform from April 25, 2018, to March 3, 2019. Shueisha collected its chapters in three tankōbon volumes, released from September 4, 2018, to May 2, 2019.

The manga is licensed in Indonesia by M&C!.

=== Volumes ===
No.	Release date	ISBN
1	September 4, 2018	978-4-08-881578-7
2	January 4, 2019	978-4-08-881699-9
3	May 2, 2019	978-4-08-881834-4
