= Karada Sagashi =

2015 manga by Welzard and Katsutoshi Murase

- First tankōbon volume cover

カラダ探し
- Genre: Horror
- Created by: Welzard
- Manga
- Written by: Katsutoshi Murase
- Published by: Shueisha
- Imprint: Jump Comics+
- Magazine: Shōnen Jump+
- Original run: September 26, 2014 – December 8, 2017
- Volumes: 17
- Original net animation
- Released: July 31, 2017 – August 11, 2017
- Runtime: 3 minutes
- Episodes: 10
- Manga

Karada Sagashi Kai
- Written by: Welzard
- Illustrated by: Katsutoshi Murase
- Published by: Shueisha
- Imprint: Jump Comics+
- Magazine: Shōnen Jump+
- Original run: January 5, 2018 – January 25, 2019
- Volumes: 5
- Manga

Karada Sagashi I
- Written by: Harumi Doki
- Illustrated by: Katsutoshi Murase
- Published by: Shueisha
- Imprint: Jump Comics+
- Magazine: Shōnen Jump+
- Original run: September 24, 2022 – March 11, 2023
- Volumes: 3
- Live-action film
- Directed by: Eiichirō Hasumi
- Written by: Harumi Doki
- Music by: Yugo Kanno
- Studio: Warner Bros. Japan
- Released: October 14, 2022
- Manga

Re/Member The Last Night
- Written by: Harumi Doki; Yūki Hara
- Illustrated by: Katsutoshi Murase
- Published by: Shueisha
- Imprint: Jump Comics+
- Magazine: Shōnen Jump+
- Original run: July 1, 2025 – January 27, 2026
- Volumes: 3
- Live-action film

Karada Sagashi The Last Night
- Directed by: Eiichirō Hasumi
- Produced by: Yūki Hara
- Written by: Harumi Doki
- Music by: Yugo Kanno
- Studio: Warner Bros. Japan
- Released: September 5, 2025

Karada Sagashi (カラダ探し; "Body Search") is a Japanese manga series written by Welzard and illustrated by Katsutoshi Murase. The series is based on a cell phone novel of the same name by Welzard. It was serialized on Shueisha's Shōnen Jump+ manga service from September 2014 to December 2017.

A 10-episode original net animation adaptation aired on Production I.G's Tate Anime app between July and August 2017. A live-action film adaptation premiered in Japan in 2022.

== Characters ==
Asuka Morisaki
Voiced by: Kana Asumi
Takahiro Ise
Voiced by: Takuya Eguchi
Haruka Mikami
Voiced by: Tamaki Orie
The Red Person
Voiced by: Aimi Tanaka
Rumiko Hiiragi
Voiced by: Reina Aoyama
Shōta Uranishi
Voiced by: Koutaro Nishiyama
Rie Naruto
Voiced by: Madoka Asahina
Kenji Sugimoto
Voiced by: Yūichirō Umehara
School Announcer
Voiced by: Aoi Koga

== Media ==
=== Manga ===
Written by Welzard and illustrated by Katsutoshi Murase, Karada Sagashi was serialized on Shueisha's Shōnen Jump+ manga service from September 26, 2014, to December 8, 2017. The series is based on a cell phone novel of the same name written by Welzard. Its chapters were collected into seventeen tankōbon volumes from February 4, 2015, to February 2, 2018.

A spin-off manga, titled Karada Sagashi Kai, was serialized on Shōnen Jump+ from January 5, 2018, to January 25, 2019. The spin-off's chapters were collected into five tankōbon volumes from April 4, 2018, to March 4, 2019.

A manga adaptation of the live-action film, titled Karada Sagashi I, was serialized on Shōnen Jump+ from September 24, 2022, to March 11, 2023. The adaptation's chapters were collected into three tankōbon volumes from November 4, 2022, to April 4, 2023.

A manga adaptation of the sequel film, titled Re/Member The Last Night was serialized on Shōnen Jump+ from July 1, 2025, to January 27, 2026. The manga is published in English on Shueisha's Manga Plus app. The adaptation's chapters were collected into three tankōbon volumes released from September 4, 2025, to April 3, 2026.

==== Karada Sagashi ====
No.	Release date	ISBN
1	February 4, 2015	978-4-08-880291-6
2	April 3, 2015	978-4-08-880347-0
3	July 3, 2015	978-4-08-880424-8
4	September 4, 2015	978-4-08-880455-2
5	December 4, 2015	978-4-08-880547-4
6	February 4, 2016	978-4-08-880614-3
7	April 4, 2016	978-4-08-880662-4
8	June 3, 2016	978-4-08-880702-7
9	August 4, 2016	978-4-08-880767-6
10	November 4, 2016	978-4-08-880817-8
11	December 31, 2016	978-4-08-880895-6
12	March 3, 2017	978-4-08-881035-5
13	May 2, 2017	978-4-08-881085-0
14	August 4, 2017	978-4-08-881131-4
15	October 4, 2017	978-4-08-881244-1
16	December 4, 2017	978-4-08-881299-1
17	February 2, 2018	978-4-08-881351-6

==== Karada Sagashi Kai ====
No.	Release date	ISBN
1	April 4, 2018	978-4-08-881484-1
2	July 4, 2018	978-4-08-881527-5
3	October 4, 2018	978-4-08-881599-2
4	December 4, 2018	978-4-08-881687-6
5	March 4, 2019	978-4-08-881789-7

==== Karada Sagashi I ====
No.	Release date	ISBN
1	November 4, 2022	978-4-08-883309-5
2	February 3, 2023	978-4-08-883408-5
3	April 4, 2023	978-4-08-883472-6

==== Re/Member The Last Night ====
No.	Release date	ISBN
1	September 4, 2025	978-4-08-884665-1
2	December 4, 2025	978-4-08-884859-4
3	April 3, 2026	978-4-08-885026-9

=== Anime ===
An original net animation adaptation was announced on April 28, 2017. Ten episodes were aired on Production I.G's Tate Anime app from July 31 to August 11, 2017.

=== Live-action film ===
A live-action film adaptation was announced on August 27, 2021. The film is produced by Warner Bros. Japan, directed by Eiichirō Hasumi, with scripts by Harumi Doki, music composed by Yugo Kanno, and stars Kanna Hashimoto as Asuka Morisaki. It premiered in Japanese theaters on October 14, 2022.

A sequel film, titled Karada Sagashi The Last Night was announced on March 19, 2025. The staff and Hashimoto will reprise their roles in the sequel, with Gordon Maeda, Seira Anzai, Fuku Suzuki, and Marin Honda also appearing in the sequel. It premiered in Japanese theaters on September 5, 2025.
