= Kiruru Kill Me =

Japanese manga series by Yasuhiro Kanō

- First tankōbon volume cover

きるる KILL ME
- Genre: Action; Romantic comedy
- Manga
- Written by: Yasuhiro Kanō
- Published by: Shueisha
- English publisher: NA: Seven Seas Entertainment
- Imprint: Jump Comics+
- Magazine: Shōnen Jump+
- Original run: February 23, 2020 – present
- Volumes: 5
- icon

Kiruru Kill Me (きるる KILL ME) is a Japanese manga series written and illustrated by Yasuhiro Kanō. It has been serialized on Shueisha's Shōnen Jump+ online platform since February 2020, with its chapters collected into five tankōbon volumes as of September 2022.

== Synopsis ==
Aoi Nemo is a medical genius and prodigy who has invented various useful devices and has had his work published in magazines. While he appears suave and debonair in public, he longs for love and fears that his work will prevent him from attaining it. One day he meets Kiruru Akaumi and falls madly in love with her. Unfortunately, he is unable to speak directly to her unless it is in a planned business or social affair. When he learns that she is an assassin, he decides to hire her to assassinate him so that he can freely "converse" with her; using his advanced medical skills to save himself should he be close to death.

== Publication ==
Kiruru Kill Me, written and illustrated by Yasuhiro Kanō, started its serialization on Shueisha's online magazine Shōnen Jump+ on February 23, 2020. Shueisha has collected its chapters into individual tankōbon volumes. The first volume was released on June 4, 2020. As of September 2, 2022, five volumes have been released. In July 2022, it was announced that the manga would go on an indefinite hiatus.

In May 2021, Seven Seas Entertainment announced that they had licensed the manga for English release in North America in both physical and digital formats starting on October 12, 2021.

=== Volumes ===
No.	Original release date	Original ISBN	English release date	English ISBN
1	June 4, 2020	978-4-08-882368-3	October 12, 2021	978-1-64-827644-6
2	February 4, 2021	978-4-08-882554-0	February 15, 2022	978-1-63858-121-5
3	July 2, 2021	978-4-08-882756-8	September 27, 2022	978-1-63858-368-4
4	March 4, 2022	978-4-08-883064-3	March 14, 2023	978-1-63858-895-5
5	September 2, 2022	978-4-08-883255-5	September 12, 2023	979-8-88843-010-1
