= Yasuhiro Kanō =

Japanese manga artist from Hokkaido (born 1970)

Yasuhiro Kanō 叶 恭弘
- Born: December 16, 1970 (age 55) Tokachi, Hokkaidō
- Area: Manga artist
- Notable works: Pretty Face, M×0

Yasuhiro Kanō (叶 恭弘, Kanō Yasuhiro) is a Japanese manga artist from Hokkaido. His first professional work was the short manga Black City, published in the autumn 1992 Shonen Jump special edition, which received Weekly Shōnen Jump's Hop Step Award for rookie artists. Several of his manga were serialized in Weekly Shōnen Jump including Pretty Face and M×0. Pretty Face was published in North America by Viz Media.

== Works ==
=== Serialized manga ===
- Pretty Face serialized in Weekly Shōnen Jump (2002–2003), 6 volumes
- M×0 serialized in Weekly Shōnen Jump (2006–2008), 10 volumes
- Kagami no Kuni no Harisugawa (鏡の国の針栖川, Harisugawa in Mirror World) serialized in Weekly Shōnen Jump (2011–2012), 3 volumes
- Kiss x Death serialized in Shōnen Jump+ (2014–2018), 7 volumes
- Kiruru Kill Me serialized in Shōnen Jump+ (2020–present), 5 volumes

=== Short works ===
- Black City (1996) - collection of previously published stories
  - Black City (1992)
  - Keita Futari (恵太二人, Two Keitas) (1993)
  - Proto One (1995)
  - Jewel of Love (1996)
- Tokyo Ants (2003) - collection of previously published stories
- Snow in the Dark (2007) - collection of previously published stories
  - Kirino Sāko to Nakamatachi (桐野佐亜子と仲間たち, Sāko Kirino And Company) (2004)
  - She Monkey (2004)
  - Snow in the Dark (2004)
  - MP0 (2005), (Prototype version of M×0)
- Doki Doki Summer Beach (ドキドキSUMMER BEACH) (2008)
- Akazukin Eliza (赤ずきんエリーザ) (2009)
- Loop (L∞P) (2009)
- Ghost Jim (2010)
- Brand New School Day (2013)
- Vetsunova (ヴェツノバ) (2013)
- White Tokyo (WHITE東京) (2014)

=== Illustrations ===
- Midnight Magic, novel series in Japan's Jump Novel magazine (1993-2001)
