= Three Days of Happiness =

Japanese novel

- Cover of the novel

三日間の幸福 (Mikkakan no kōfuku)
- Genre: Drama; Romance; Supernatural
- Novel
- Written by: Sugaru Miaki
- Illustrated by: E9L
- Published by: ASCII Media Works
- English publisher: NA: Yen Press
- Imprint: Media Works Bunko
- Published: December 25, 2013
- Manga
- Written by: Sugaru Miaki
- Illustrated by: Shōichi Taguchi
- Published by: Shueisha
- English publisher: NA: Yen Press
- Imprint: Jump Comics+
- Magazine: Shōnen Jump+
- Original run: August 10, 2016 – October 25, 2017
- Volumes: 3

Three Days of Happiness (三日間の幸福, Mikkakan no kōfuku) is a Japanese novel written by Sugaru Miaki and illustrated by E9L. It was published by ASCII Media Works in December 2013. The novel received a manga adaptation titled I Sold My Life for Ten Thousand Yen Per Year (寿命を買い取ってもらった。一年につき、一万円で。, Jumyō o Kaitotte Moratta. Ichinen ni Tsuki, Ichimanen de.) illustrated by Shōichi Taguchi and published by Shueisha on their Shōnen Jump+ platform, and then released in three tankōbon volumes.

== Plot ==
Unable to make ends meet in Japan with his part-time job, 20 year old Kusunoki prepares to sell the last of his possessions. After visiting a library to sell books, the clerk tells Kusunoki of a place where he can sell his lifespan for money. Everything between how impactful someone is to the world and how many people they have affected determine the price of their lifespan. Curious, Kusunoki decides to see the place. There, he meets a mysterious clerk, a girl named Miyagi. Miyagi informs him that Kusunoki's entire lifespan is only worth ¥300,000 (about $2000), abysmally lower than the average. Realizing that his future is worthless, Kusunoki sells his lifespan, keeping only 3 months so that he may enjoy the money. The next day, he awakens to Miyagi knocking on his door. As a policy of the company, she was sent to watch over Kusunoki for the next 3 months until his death. With the money he acquired and only 3 more months to live, Kusunoki seeks to amend his hopeless life under Miyagi's watch.

== Characters ==
Kusunoki (クスノキ)
A 20 year old man in a dire life and financial situation, who sells his 30 year long lifespan for ¥300,000.
Miyagi (ミヤギ)
A young woman who is a clerk from the lifespan store who becomes Kusunoki's monitor over the next three months.
Himeno (ヒメノ)
Kusunoki's childhood friend whom he had feelings for.

== Media ==
=== Novel ===
Written by Sugaru Miaki and illustrated by E9L, Three Days of Happiness was published in a single volume by ASCII Media Works under their Media Works Bunko imprint on December 25, 2013.

The novel was licensed for English release in North America by Yen Press; it was released on October 20, 2020.

=== Manga ===
A manga adaptation of the novel written by Sugaru Miaki and illustrated by Shōichi Taguchi, titled Jumyō o Kaitotte Moratta. Ichinen ni Tsuki, Ichimanen de, was serialized on Shueisha's Shōnen Jump+ app and website from August 10, 2016, to October 25, 2017. Shueisha collected its chapters in three tankōbon volumes, released from July 4 to December 4, 2017.

In March 2026, Yen Press announced that they had licensed the manga adaptation for English publication.

== See also ==
- Futari Escape, a manga series written and illustrated by Shōichi Taguchi
