= Ex-Arm =

Japanese manga series

- First tankōbon volume cover

EX-ARM(エクスアーム)
- Genre: Action; Crime; Cyberpunk
- Manga

Ex-Vita
- Written by: Shinya Komi
- Published by: Shueisha
- Magazine: Miracle Jump
- Original run: December 13, 2011 – April 30, 2013
- Volumes: 2
- Manga
- Written by: HiRock
- Illustrated by: Shinya Komi
- Published by: Shueisha
- Magazine: Grand Jump (2015–2017); Shōnen Jump+ (2017–2019)
- Original run: February 18, 2015 – June 26, 2019
- Volumes: 14
Further information
Novel
Ex-Arm the Novel: Deus Ex Machina
Written by	Atarō Kumo
Published by	Shueisha
Imprint	Jump J-Books
Published	December 19, 2018
Manga
Ex-Arm EXA
Written by	HiRock
Illustrated by	Shinya Komi
Published by	Shueisha
Magazine	Grand Jump Mucha
Original run	August 28, 2019 – February 27, 2021
Volumes	2
Manga
Ex-Arm Another Code
Written by	Atarō Kumo
Illustrated by	Shinya Komi
Published by	Shueisha
Magazine	Ultra Jump
Original run	February 19, 2020 – November 19, 2020
Volumes	2
Anime television series
Directed by	Yoshikatsu Kimura
Produced by	Hiroshi Tani (Note: Unconfirmed romanization of 関谷博); Yūki Satō; Yoshinori Suzuki (Note: Unconfirmed romanization of 鈴木嘉規); Hisato Usui; Hidenobu Okada (Note: Unconfirmed romanization of 岡田秀信); Hiroyasu Taniguchi; Kento Yoshida; Shinji Ōmori
Written by	Tommy Morton
Music by	Sō Kimura
Studio	Visual Flight
Licensed by	Crunchyroll; SA/SEA: Muse Communication
Original network	Tokyo MX, SUN, BS Fuji
Original run	January 11, 2021 – March 29, 2021
Episodes	12
- icon

Ex-Arm (Note: Japanese: EX-ARM(エクスアーム)) is a Japanese manga series written by HiRock and illustrated by Shinya Komi. The series is a remake of Komi's earlier manga Ex-Vita. It was serialized in Shueisha's seinen manga magazine Grand Jump from February 2015 to December 2017, and later on Shueisha's Shōnen Jump+ website from December 2017 to June 2019. Shueisha compiled its chapters into fourteen tankōbon volumes. A sequel manga titled Ex-Arm EXA was serialized in Grand Jump Mucha from August 2019 to February 2021 and compiled into two volumes.

An anime television series adaptation by Visual Flight aired from January to March 2021.

== Plot ==
In 2014, a high school student named Akira Natsume endures a phobia of electrical devices while also being very good at diagnosing them. He leads an average, unfulfilling life, and resolves to change himself for the better and get a girlfriend after being motivated by his older brother. Soon after, he suddenly dies in an accident. 16 years later, a young policewoman named Minami Uenozono and her android partner Alma retrieve and activate a highly advanced AI superweapon known as an "Ex-Arm" and put it into full control of their ship as a last resort. The AI turns out to be Akira's brain, now in a digital form. The series revolves around the police force's attempts to suppress and defeat adversaries using Ex-Arms for their own purposes.

== Characters ==
Akira Natsume (夏目 アキラ, Natsume Akira)
Voiced by: Soma Saito
Minami Uezono (上園 美波, Uezono Minami)
Voiced by: Mikako Komatsu
Alma (アルマ, Aruma)
Voiced by: Akari Kitō
Soushi Shiga (士牙 総司, Shiga Sōshi)
Voiced by: Daisuke Namikawa
Chikage Rokuoin (鹿王院 千景, Rokuōin Chikage)
Voiced by: Sumire Uesaka
Alisa Himegami (アリサ 姫神, Arisa Himegami)
Voiced by: Yui Ishikawa
Kimura (キムラ)
Voiced by: Taku Yashiro
Kondō (近藤)
Voiced by: Shōmaru Zōza
Shūichi Natsume (夏目 柊一, Natsume Shūichi)
Voiced by: Kōji Yusa
Sōma (蒼真)
Voiced by: Yū Kobayashi
Yggdrasil (ユグドラシル, Yugudorashiru)
Voiced by: Miyu Tomita
Kaori Munakata (宗像 香織, Munakata Kaori)
Voiced by: Satomi Arai
Elmira (エルミラ, Erumira)
Voiced by: Azumi Waki
Throughhand (スルーハンド, Surūhando)
Voiced by: Takaya Kuroda

== Media ==
=== Manga ===
Prior to Ex-Arm, a manga series written and illustrated by Shinya Komi, titled Ex-Vita, was published in Shueisha's seinen manga magazine Miracle Jump from December 13, 2011, to April 30, 2013. Shueisha collected is chapters into two tankōbon volumes, published on August 17, 2012, and June 19, 2013.

Written by HiRock and illustrated by Komi, Ex-Arm was published in Shueisha's Grand Jump from February 18, 2015, to December 6, 2017. The series was then transferred to the Shōnen Jump+ website and app, and ran from December 20, 2017, to June 26, 2019. Shueisha collected its chapters into fourteen tankōbon volumes, released from June 19, 2015, to August 19, 2019.

A sequel series, titled Ex-Arm EXA, was serialized in Grand Jump Mucha from August 28, 2019, to February 27, 2021. The first collected tankōbon volume was released on December 18, 2020. The second volume was released on March 18, 2021.

A manga adaptation of the novel Ex-Arm the Novel: Deus Ex Machina, titled Ex-Arm Another Code, was serialized in Shueisha's Ultra Jump from February 19 to November 19, 2020. The two collected tankōbon volumes were released on December 18, 2020, and January 19, 2021.

==== Volumes ====
No.	Japanese release date	Japanese ISBN
1	June 19, 2015	978-4-08-890215-9
2	September 18, 2015	978-4-08-890286-9
3	December 18, 2015	978-4-08-890335-4
4	April 19, 2016	978-4-08-890403-0
5	August 19, 2016	978-4-08-890472-6
6	November 18, 2016	978-4-08-890525-9
7	April 19, 2017	978-4-08-890619-5
8	July 19, 2017	978-4-08-890694-2
9	December 19, 2017	978-4-08-890770-3
10	April 19, 2018	978-4-08-891008-6
11	August 17, 2018	978-4-08-891139-7
12	December 19, 2018	978-4-08-891158-8
13	April 19, 2019	978-4-08-891213-4
14	August 19, 2019	978-4-08-891243-1

=== Novel ===
A novel titled Ex-Arm the Novel: Deus Ex Machina, written by Atarō Kumo, was published by Shueisha under its Jump J-Books imprint on December 19, 2018.

=== Anime ===
An anime television series adaptation was announced on the release of the manga's 12th volume on December 18, 2018. The series is produced by Visual Flight and directed by Yoshikatsu Kimura, with Tommy Morton in charge of the scripts and Sō Kimura as composer. The main staff of the series have no previous experience with working on anime. Originally set for a July 2020 release, the series aired from January 11 to March 29, 2021, on Tokyo MX, SUN, and BS Fuji due to the COVID-19 pandemic. The opening theme is "Rise Again" performed by AIRFLIP, while the ending theme is "Diamonds Shine" performed by Dizzy Sunfist.

==== Episodes ====
No.	Title (Note: All English titles are taken from Crunchyroll.)	Directed by (Note: Information is taken from the ending credits of each episode.)	Written by	Original release date
1	"Forbidden Weapon"; Transliteration: "Kindan no Heiki" (Japanese: 禁断の兵器)	Shingo Kinoshita	Tommy Morton	January 11, 2021
2	"Day of Judgement"; Transliteration: "Shinpan no Hi" (Japanese: 審判の日)	Shingo Kinoshita	Tommy Morton	January 18, 2021
3	"Angel of Murder"; Transliteration: "Satsuriku no Tenshi" (Japanese: 殺戮の天使)	Shingo Kinoshita	Tommy Morton	January 25, 2021
4	"Inheritor of Courage"; Transliteration: "Yūki Tsugu Mono" (Japanese: 勇気 継ぐ者)	Shingo Kinoshita	Tommy Morton	February 1, 2021
5	"Red-Hot Daydream!"; Transliteration: "Tokimeki Deidorīmu!" (Japanese: ときめきデイドリーム！)	Shingo Kinoshita	Tommy Morton	February 8, 2021
6	"Ex-Arm Auction"; Transliteration: "Ekusu Āmu Ōkushon" (Japanese: EX-ARMオークション)	Shingo Kinoshita	Tommy Morton	February 15, 2021
7	"Banquet of Fire"; Transliteration: "Honō no Butōkai" (Japanese: 炎の舞踏会)	Shingo Kinoshita	Natsumi Kemuyama	February 22, 2021
8	"βeta" Transliteration: "β 〜Bēta〜" (Japanese: β 〜ベータ〜)	Shingo Kinoshita	Shintarō Shimoi; Tommy Morton	March 1, 2021
9	"Fallen Messiah"; Transliteration: ""Horobi" no Kyūseishu" (Japanese: "滅び"の救世主)	Shingo Kinoshita	Tommy Morton	March 8, 2021
10	"Genes of the Original Sin"; Transliteration: "Genzai no Idenshi" (Japanese: 原罪の遺伝子)	Shingo Kinoshita	Natsumi Kemuyama	March 15, 2021
11	"Proof of Humanity"; Transliteration: "Ningen no Akashi" (Japanese: 人間の証)	Shingo Kinoshita	Shintarō Shimoi; Tommy Morton	March 22, 2021
12	"A Giant Leap"; Transliteration: "Idai na Ippo" (Japanese: 偉大な一歩)	Shingo Kinoshita	Tommy Morton	March 29, 2021

== Reception ==
The anime was met with backlash due to the poor quality of the computer-generated imagery (CGI) animation.
