= Mone-san no Majimesugiru Tsukiaikata =

Japanese manga series

- First tankōbon volume cover

モネさんのマジメすぎるつき合い方
- Genre: Romantic comedy
- Manga
- Written by: Masaki Gotō
- Published by: Shueisha
- Imprint: Jump Comics+
- Magazine: Shōnen Jump+
- Original run: August 11, 2017 – September 13, 2019
- Volumes: 8
- icon

Mone-san no Majimesugiru Tsukiaikata (モネさんのマジメすぎるつき合い方, Monet's Serious Relationship) is a Japanese web manga series written and illustrated by Masaki Gotō. It was serialized on Shueisha's Shōnen Jump+ online platform from August 2017 to September 2019, with its chapters collected in eight tankōbon volumes.

== Publication ==
Written and illustrated by Masaki Gotō, Mone-san no Majimesugiru Tsukiaikata was serialized on Shueisha's Shōnen Jump+ online platform from August 11, 2017, to September 13, 2019. Shueisha collected its chapters in eight tankōbon volumes, released from November 2, 2017, to October 4, 2019.

=== Volumes ===
No.	Japanese release date	Japanese ISBN
1	November 2, 2017	978-4-08-881269-4
2	March 2, 2018	978-4-08-881456-8
3	May 2, 2018	978-4-08-881486-5
4	September 4, 2018	978-4-08-881612-8
5	December 4, 2018	978-4-08-881675-3
6	June 4, 2019	978-4-08-882014-9
7	September 4, 2019	978-4-08-882066-8
8	October 4, 2019	978-4-08-882071-2
