= Hyperinflation (manga) =

Japanese manga series

- First tankōbon volume cover

ハイパーインフレーション (Haipāinfurēshon)
- Manga
- Written by: Kyu Sumiyoshi
- Published by: Shueisha
- Imprint: Jump Comics+
- Magazine: Shōnen Jump+
- Original run: November 27, 2020 – March 17, 2023
- Volumes: 6
- icon

Hyperinflation (Japanese: ハイパーインフレーション, Hepburn: Haipāinfurēshon) is a Japanese manga series written and illustrated by Kyu Sumiyoshi. It was serialized on Shueisha's web manga platform Shōnen Jump+ from November 2020 to March 2023, with its chapters collected in six tankōbon volumes.

== Publication ==
Written and illustrated by Kyu Sumiyoshi, Hyperinflation started on Shueisha's web manga platform Shōnen Jump+ from November 27, 2020, to March 17, 2023. Shueisha collected its chapters in six tankōbon volumes, released from April 2, 2021, to May 2, 2023.

=== Volumes ===
No.	Release date	ISBN
1	April 2, 2021	978-4-08-882620-2
2	September 3, 2021	978-4-08-882714-8
3	December 3, 2021	978-4-08-882851-0
4	May 2, 2022	978-4-08-883077-3
5	October 4, 2022	978-4-08-883274-6
6	May 2, 2023	978-4-08-883476-4

== Reception ==
Hyperinflation was nominated for the seventh Next Manga Awards in 2021 in the web manga category and placed sixth out of 50 nominees. It ranked eleventh on Takarajimasha's Kono Manga ga Sugoi! 2022 list of best manga for male readers; it ranked fourteenth on the 2024 list. It was ranked first in AnimeJapan's sixth "Most Wanted Anime Adaptation" poll in 2023.

== See also ==
- Strikeout Pitch, another manga series by the same author
