= Tsurun Hatomune =

Japanese manga artist

- 鳩胸つるん
- Born: Aichi Prefecture, Japan
- Occupation: Manga artist
- Writing career
- Years active: 2011–present
- Genre: Comedy
- Notable work: Mitama Security

Tsurun Hatomune (Japanese: 鳩胸つるん) is the pen name of a Japanese manga artist. His first serial, A Naked Swan, was published digitally on the Shōnen Jump+ platform between 2017 and 2018. From 2019 to 2020, he created Mitama Security for the print magazine Weekly Shōnen Jump. Hatomune then returned to Shōnen Jump+, where he serialized Service Wars (2023) and Chuck Beans (2025). He currently serializes Surechigoi in the digital magazine Comic Lux.

== Early life ==
Tsurun Hatomune was born in Aichi Prefecture, but resides in Chiba Prefecture. Having liked Dragon Ball and drawing since early childhood, he started drawing manga in his school notebook in early elementary school. However, he became obsessed with basketball in fifth grade, stopped drawing, and devoted himself to the sport until his fourth year of college. When he began looking for a career, he realized he wanted to be a manga artist.

== Career ==
Hatomune said he chose to draw gag manga because he did not have high level drawing skills and did not know how to use the tools. His first manga won an honorable mention at the 74th Akatsuka Awards in 2011. However, it was then years of drawing at least one story a month with no success getting a serial. He created the one-shot "A Naked Swan" which was published in the Autumn 2015 issue of Jump SQ. Crown. Influenced by the popular series To Love Ru Darkness, his editor Junichi Tamada, whom he had worked with since 2011, suggested the manga feature a naked protagonist. Given this exhibitionist main character, Hatomune studied the shōjo manga of Bessatsu Margaret in order for his art to not be too vulgar. He cited Machida-kun no Sekai and Kimi ni Todoke as his favorites. The artist also uses sports magazines as references, particularly ballet for its use of hands. Due to this art style, many people incorrectly assumed Hatomune was a woman. Reception to the one-shot was good, but Tamada was unable to get the work serialized in Jump SQ.. Hatomune published the one-shot "Senchi wa Tsudzuku yo Doko Made mo" on April 14, 2017, in the Spring 2017 issue of Jump SQ. Crown. This was followed by "Hotto! Kyatto Sentō" in the Summer 2017 issue of the magazine, which was published on July 14, 2017.

When Tamada was transferred to Shōnen Jump+, Hatomune followed and they revived A Naked Swan for serialization on the digital platform on December 14, 2017. It was initially only going to be one volume long, but very positive reception by readers led to the series continuing. A special chapter was published in the print magazine Weekly Shōnen Jump on June 11, 2018. A Naked Swan ended on December 6, 2018, and was collected into four tankōbon volumes. The series was nominated for Best Web Manga at the 2018 Next Manga Awards, where it came in 16th place.

Hatomune began Mitama Security in Weekly Shōnen Jump on September 2, 2019. It ended serialization on August 11, 2020, a spinoff chapter was published on Shōnen Jump+ on August 31, 2020, and the chapters were collected into five volumes. It was nominated for Best Print Manga at the 2020 Next Manga Awards, where it placed 13th. Hatomune then returned to Shōnen Jump+, where he released the one-shot "Nan no Koreshiki!" on November 11, 2022. He serialized Service Wars on the digital platform from March 26 to December 3, 2023, with its chapters collected into four volumes. It was nominated for Best Web Manga at the 2023 Next Manga Awards.

On December 12, 2024, Hatomune began Surechigoi in the debut issue of Bunkasha's digital josei manga magazine Comic Lux. A sister magazine of Comic Tanto, Lux is released on the second Thursday of every month. Hatomune serialized Chuck Beans weekly on Shōnen Jump+ from March 2, to August 3, 2025. A special bonus chapter featuring the protagonists from Service Wars, Mitama Security and A Naked Swan was released on September 7, 2025.

== Works ==
Serials

- A Naked Swan (剥き出しの白鳥, Mukidashi no Hakuchō) (2017–2018; serialized on Shōnen Jump+)
- Mitama Security: Spirit Busters (ミタマセキュ霊ティ) (2019–2020; serialized in Weekly Shōnen Jump)
- Service Wars (接客無双, Sekkyaku Musō) (2023; serialized on Shōnen Jump+)
- Surechigoi (すれち恋) (2024–present; serialized in Comic Lux)
- Chuck Beans (チャックび〜んず) (2025; serialized on Shōnen Jump+)

One-shots

- "A Naked Swan" (2015; Jump SQ. Crown)
- "Senchi wa Tsudzuku yo Doko Made mo" (センチは続くよどこまでも) (2017; Jump SQ. Crown)
- "Hotto! Kyatto Sentō" (ほっと!キャット銭湯) (2017; Jump SQ. Crown)
- "Nan no Koreshiki!" (なんのっこれしき！) (2022; Shōnen Jump+)
