= Hitoner =

Japanese manga series

- First tankōbon volume cover

ヒトナー (Hitonā)
- Genre: Science fiction
- Manga
- Written by: Tomohiro Yagi
- Published by: Shueisha
- Imprint: Jump Comics+
- Magazine: Shōnen Jump+
- Original run: April 22, 2026 – present
- Volumes: 1

Hitoner (Japanese: ヒトナー, Hepburn: Hitonā) is a Japanese manga series written and illustrated by Tomohiro Yagi. Originally published as a one-shot in February 2024, it has been serialized on Shueisha's Shōnen Jump+ service since April 2026.

== Plot ==
Far beyond the vast expanse of space, there lies a planet remarkably similar to Earth, where beastkin called Kemo live. To them, Hito or humans were nothing more than mythical, fictional creatures. Only a few, those who are called Hitoner, showed any interest in Hito. However, one day, an Earthling astronaut landed on the planet of Kemo. And then, two races with different appearances awkwardly begin to interact in an attempt to understand each other.

== Publication ==
Hitoner was originally a one-shot on February 15, 2024, later published in an anthology of Weekly Shōnen Jump series. Hitoner started publication as a series on Shueisha's Shōnen Jump+ service on April 22, 2026. Its chapters have been compiled into a single tankōbon volume as of September 2026.

Manga Plus is publishing chapters of the series simultaneously with their Japanese release.

No.	Release date	ISBN
1	September 4, 2026	978-4-08-885231-7

== Reception ==
Hitoner was ranked first in a Game Rant list of the best isekai manga released in 2024. The original one shot was recommended by Kōhei Horikoshi.

The series was ranked second in the web category at the twelfth Next Manga Awards in 2026.
