= Strikeout Pitch =

Japanese manga series

- First tankōbon volume cover

サンキューピッチ (Sankyū Pitchi)
- Genre: Sports
- Manga
- Written by: Kyu Sumiyoshi
- Published by: Shueisha
- Imprint: Jump Comics+
- Magazine: Shōnen Jump+
- Original run: September 3, 2024 – present
- Volumes: 7

Strikeout Pitch (Japanese: サンキューピッチ, Hepburn: Sankyū Pitchi) is a Japanese manga series written and illustrated by Kyu Sumiyoshi. It began serialization on Shueisha's Shōnen Jump+ web service in September 2024, and has been compiled into seven volumes as of October 2026.

== Plot ==
Rumors spread about a mysterious man known as the "Baseball Club Slasher" who appears at night. Heita Kobori, a high school student and captain of Yokohama Soha High School's baseball team, dismisses the rumors, only to be approached by the Baseball Club Slasher one night. After being impressed by his pitching skills, Heita aims to recruit him to the school's baseball team, aiming to reach Koshien. He learns that the man is Fusetsu Kiriyama, a student at Soha High with great baseball skills, but is only able to pitch properly three times a day. Despite Fusetsu's condition, Heita recruits him to the baseball team as a reliever, with the team hoping to make it to Koshien with Fusetsu's help.

== Characters ==
Fusetsu Kiriyama (桐山 不折, Kiriyama Fusetsu)
Voiced by: Takuya Sato (Vomic Volume 2), Hideyuki Kobayashi
A skilled baseball player who pitches with his right hand. He was previously part of the baseball team but retired due to suffering from the yips. Due to his condition, he is only able to throw three good pitches per day before his pitching becomes far weaker. After his retirement, he would often challenge people to three-pitching challenges, leading to his reputation as the "Baseball Club Slasher".
Heita Kobori (小堀 へいた, Kobori Heita)
Voiced by: Nayuta Sugiura
The captain of Soha High School's baseball team, he was initially skeptical about the rumors about the Baseball Club Slasher, only for him to encounter Fusetsu one night. He aims to reach Koshien, the most prestigious high school baseball tournament in Japan.
Yōji Hirose (広瀬 洋二, Hirose Yōji)
Voiced by: Yukiya Matsui
A member of the Soha High School baseball team. He aims to become a sports researcher in the future.
Minako Agawa (阿川 美奈子, Agawa Minako)
Voiced by: Sumire Uesaka (Vomic "St-trike!"), Sora Amamiya (Vomic "You Don't Like Dirty Jokes!?"), Hitomi Ueda (Vomic "Take Me To Koshien")
A classic literature teacher acting as the coach of the Soha High School baseball team.

== Publication ==
The series is written and illustrated by Kyu Sumiyoshi. It began serialization on Shueisha's Shōnen Jump+ web service on September 3, 2024. The first tankōbon volume was released on January 4, 2025; seven volumes have been released as of October 2026.

The series' chapters are simultaneously published in English on Shueisha's Manga Plus app.

No.	Release date	ISBN
1	January 4, 2025	978-4-08-884305-6
2	May 2, 2025	978-4-08-884499-2
3	October 3, 2025	978-4-08-884668-2
4	December 4, 2025	978-4-08-884771-9
5	March 4, 2026	978-4-08-884882-2
6	June 4, 2026	978-4-08-885065-8
7	October 2, 2026	978-4-08-885216-4

== Reception ==
The series won the eleventh Next Manga Award in the Web Manga category in 2025. The series was ranked third in the 2026 edition of Takarajimasha's Kono Manga ga Sugoi! guidebook's list of the best manga for male readers. The series was ranked ninth in the Nationwide Bookstore Employees' Recommended Comics list of 2026. The series was nominated for the 19th Manga Taishō in 2026, and was ranked eighth. The series was ranked second in AnimeJapan's "Manga We Want to See Animated" poll in 2026.

Yūki Honda of the website Kai-You praised the first chapter's writing, comparing it favorably to Sumiyoshi's previous manga Hyperinflation and how the chapter showed baseball as a game of wits.

== See also ==
- Hyperinflation, another manga series by the same author
