= Centuria (manga) =

Japanese manga series

- First tankōbon volume cover

ケントゥリア (Kenturia)
- Genre: Dark fantasy
- Manga
- Written by: Tohru Kuramori
- Published by: Shueisha
- English publisher: NA: Viz Media
- Imprint: Jump Comics+
- Magazine: Shōnen Jump+
- Original run: April 8, 2024 – present
- Volumes: 10
- icon

Centuria (Japanese: ケントゥリア, Hepburn: Kenturia) is a Japanese web manga series written and illustrated by Tohru Kuramori. It has been serialized in Shueisha's Shōnen Jump+ app and website since April 2024, with its chapters collected in ten tankōbon volumes as of October 2026.

== Plot ==
Julian is a young boy who, after killing the blacksmith his mother sold him to, flees as a stowaway in a slave ship. Once discovered, he becomes a slave himself but is welcomed into a close group of slaves who support each other, especially Mira, a pregnant woman who shares her food with him and takes him under her wing. The ship's captain has the slaves murdered at sea to commit insurance fraud, but this accidentally calls forward an eldritch sea entity who, for the blood of the 100 killed slaves, including Mira, gifts Julian with their combined strength and their 100 lives. Now empowered and indebted to the 100 slaves killed protecting him and Mira's newborn daughter, Diana, he sets off to a new country to raise her.

== Characters ==
=== Julian's group ===
Julian (ユリアン, Yurian)
Julian is a former slave who has chosen to use his freedom to raise and bring about a happy life to his adoptive sister Diana, the daughter of a slave named Mira who he had previously formed a bond with.
Diana (ディアナ)
Diana is the infant daughter of Mira and the adoptive sister of Julian, who is bound to bring the downfall of the king, according to prophecy.
Angvall Selma (アンヴァル サラマ, Anvaru Seruma) / Amber (アンバー, Anbā)
Angvall, also known as the Unrivaled Cloaked Knight (比類なきたてがみ, Hirui Naki Tategami), is a Commander Knight of her country, as well as the caretaker of Titi, Julian and Diana.
Titi (ティティ)
Titi is a young girl who was orphaned during the Western War and was taken in and raised by Angvall.
Lukas (ルーカス, Rukasu)
Lukas is a kind former mercenary who befriends Julian and Diana during their stay in a town, and secretly a gifted bastard son of the king.
Lacrima Balkar (ラクリマ バラカル, Rakururima Barukaru)
Princess Lacrima is Arkos' impetulant little sister, who also has similar powers to her brother.
Zana (ザナ)
Zana is an assassin blackmailed by Elstri to hunt Diana, who has the gift to freely manipulate and change the shape and properties of her bone structure. After Elstri loses the leverage on her, Julian takes her in.

=== The Village ===
Joseph (ジョゼ, Joze)
Joseph is a humble worker and family man in the village, who becomes good friends with Julian.
Marie (マリー, Marī)
Marie is Joseph's wife and mother of their child, as well as Diana's wet nurse.
Joseph's father
Joseph's father is a somewhat senile man, who is still a keen and skilled hunter and a great shot with a bow.
Ravenna (ラベンナ, Rabenna)
Ravenna is the village doctor who claims to also be able to ward off curses.

=== The 100 Slaves ===
Mira (ミラ)
Mira was a pregnant slave, and later Diana's mother, who grew very close to Julian and taught him about what it means to be human.
Hillars (ヒラルス, Hirarusu)
Hillars was the oldest among the slaves, who treated Julian with kindness and was among the first to stand up for him on the ship.
Ninith (ニニト, Ninito)
Ninith was a young and soft spoken slave, who first actually met Julian when her life-force was exhausted in battle by him.

=== Torivia ===
The King
The King, also hailed as the Supreme Lord (至高き君, Ito Takaki Kimi), is the benevolent ruler of Torivia, whom Angvall looks up to. He possesses unknown powers similar to those of Julian.
Eire Balkar (エイレー バラカル, Eire Barukaru)
The Queen, a seemingly doting mother who enabled her son's malevolent tendencies, believing him to be a gift from God due to the powers he was born with, while also completely disregarding Lacrima.
Elstri (エルストリ, Erusutori)
Elstri is a prophetess and the close aide to the king who serves him from the shadows, being renowned for her accurate divinations, who foretold that a great calamity will be brought upon the kingdom by Diana in the future.
Zira (ジーラ, Jīra)
Arkos' aide is the usually indifferent maid formerly from Rummir, who accompanies Arkos everywhere and tells him the king's orders.
Guillaume (ギヨーム, Giyōmu)
Guillaume, also touted as Ironclad Guillaume (塊のギヨーム, Tekkai no Giyōmu), is a mace-wielding Commander Knight, who accompanied Elstri to the village to investigate Angvall's report.
Nile Pharmakeia (ナイル パルマケイア, Nairu Parumakeia)
Nile is a veteran soldier of Torivia who served in the Western War under the command of Angvall Selma and later Guillaume.
Balbad (バルバド, Barubado)
Balbad is an apathetic assassin employed by Elstri, who has the gift to manipulate nails of any size.
Liu (リゥ, Ryu)
Liu is a serious assassin employed by Elstri, who has the gift to manipulate the weight of anything he came in contact with. His sister was also a gifted one, whose gift turned her body into the axe Liu wields.
Trozo (トロゾ, Torozo)
Trozo is an arrogant assassin employed by Elstri, who has the gift to shapeshift into a huge wolf-like monster.
Atoria (アトリア)
Atoria is a young and slender girl with the gift to heal others' injuries at the expense of her own lifeforce. She is a close friend of Lukas and subordinate of Lalawag, who resides in the Margraviate.
Ivrea (イヴレーア, Ivurēa)
Ivrea, also known as the Mountain Wind (山籟, Sanrai), is a member of the Black Knights, whose gift allows her to manifest a pair of dark bird-like wings.
Elegia (エレジア, Erejia)
Elegia is a former member of the Accursed Battalion of Rummir with an unknown gift, who left her service to follow her master Ceodric.

=== Iris Stratum ===
Arkos Balkar (アルコス バラカル, Arukosu Barukaru) / Altus (アルトゥス, Arutusu)
Arkos, also known as the Water King (水王, Suiō), is the Supreme Lord's egotistical and nihilistic son, who serves as the sole defender of the Western border, as he has similar marking powers like Julian, that he inherited from his father. He is also the former first seat of the Iris Stratum (天弓の階層, Īrisu no Kaisō), the supreme combat force in Torivia's royal palace, consisting of the most powerful gifted ones in the country.
Helem (へレム, Heremu)
Helem, also known as the Corpse Sludge (屍泥, Shidei) is a gifted one and Elstri's close confidant. Her gift allows her to resurrect a deceased person, using a piece of their remains, using this gift to resurrect the prince as a living doll named Altus, to use as a secret weapon against Julian. She is also the seventh seat of the Iris Stratum.
Veselka (ヴェセルカ, Veseruka)
Veselka, also known as the Veselka of Oblivion (忘却のヴェセルカ, Bōkyaku no Veseruka) is a Black Knight and the second seat of the Iris Stratum, whose gift allows him to manipulate minds. He is also the one who cast a shadowy veil over the Supreme Lord's face in everyone's mind.
Lalawag (ララワグ, Rarawagu)
Lalawag, also known as Lalawag the Propagation (増殖のララワグ, Zōshoku no Rarawagu) is a former Black Knight and the third seat of the Iris Stratum. Physically, she is an imposing woman, whose gift allows her to infinitely duplicate inanimate objects or multiply her own limbs, but not other living beings. She has a doting, motherly relationship with Lukas. She is also the vessel of the bones of the Deity of Night.
Ceodric (セオドリク, Seodoriku)
Ceodric, also known as Raging Flame (群炎, Gun'en), is the arrogant fourth seat of the Iris Stratum, whose gift allows him to manipulate fire and its properties and in a way to heal others, considering that he is the strongest healer of the kingdom. Originally, he was the prince of the opposing country Rummir, born as Shif la Scyrus (シフ ラ シュルス, Shifu Ra Shurusu), before Arkos brought him over.
Lattice (ラーチス, Rātisu)
Lattice, also known as Nightshade (冥身, Meishin), is the current first seat of the Iris Stratum and the personal attendant to Queen Eire. Her gift is unknown, but she wields a sword.
Dragon Kin (竜概, Ryūgai)
His name unknown, the Dragon Kin is an towering, four-armed Black Knight and the fifth seat of the Iris Stratum. His gift is unknown.
Holy Grail (聖杯, Seihai)
Her name unknown, the Holy Grail is a petite, tanned girl, who is the sixth seat of the Iris Stratum. Her gift is unknown.

=== Rummir ===
The Empress
The Empress is the benevolent elderly ruler of the Rummir Empire and mother to Ceodric and Rif. She is willing to sacrifice her child to keep the peace and protect her people. She is also a gifted one, whose gift allows her to slightly influence all of Rummir to be loyal and worship the Scyrus clan.
Rif la Scyrus (リフ ラ シュルス, Rifu Ra Shurusu)
Rif la Scyrus, better known as the Voidmarcher (空渡, Uro Watari), is the strongest gifted one in the nation of Rummir and the Divine Vessel carrying the organs of the goddess Vulja. She is a member of the royal family, and Ceodric's sister. She wears a dark, organic-looking headpiece adorned with multiple horns that curve outward and upward.
Accursed (相貌, Sōbō)
The Accursed is the central and most dangerous member of the Accursed Battalion, as well as Ceodric and Rif's half-sister. She covers her face at all times, since her gift cannot be turned off and it affects everyone who sees it indiscriminately. Her gift grants the ability to inflict a progressively worsening curse upon anyone who looks at her face, resulting in gruesome death after approx. 10 seconds.
Wattor (ワトル, Watoru)
Wattor is gifted one and member of Rummir's Accursed Battalion, the elite combat squadron of Rummir, consisting of the most powerful gifted ones in the country. Like every other member, Wattor covers his eyes. He is also the group's interpreter, when speaking to someone from Torivia.
Biz (ビズ, Bizu)
Bizu is a young gifted one and a member of Rummir's Accursed Battalion. Her gift allows her to create a nigh-indestructible barrier around her target, which is powered by her unshakable willpower.
Gugub (ググブ, Gugubu)
Gugub is an older gifted one with a long beard and a member of Rummir's Accursed Battalion. His gift allows him to generate a variety of pointed weapons from his body.
Joe (ジョー, Jō)
Joe is a tall, lean gifted one and a member of Rummir's Accursed Battalion. His gift grants him the ability to emit a powerful scream capable of directly affecting a target's inner ear, including his own, if not blocked.
Goliath (ゴリアテ, Goriate)
Goliath is a towering, brutish gifted one and a member of Rummir's Accursed Battalion. His gift allows him to turn his skin into tough stone and change his shape.
Foll (フォル, Foru)
Foll is a young and careless gifted one and a member of Rummir's Accursed Battalion. His gift grants him enhanced speed, agility and reflexes, and he wields knives in battle.
Leetz (リーツ, Rītsu)
Rooln is a petite gifted one and a member of Rummir's Accursed Battalion. She mostly uses weapons to fight, and her gift allows her to drive people to suicide with her vocal commands.
Rooln (ルウルン, Rūrun)
Rooln is a young and brunette gifted one and a member of Rummir's Accursed Battalion. Her gift is unknown.
Mona (モナ)
Mona was a blunt, but kind citizen from Rummir and Zira's foster mother after the death of her parents during the Western War.
Xiao (シャオ, Shao)
Xiao is a young and ambitious retainer and close friend of Ceodric's during his childhood, alongside Bangus.
Bangus (バンガス, Bangasu)
Bangus is a young and ambitious retainer and close friend of Ceodric's during his childhood, alongside Xiao.

=== Ladies of Midnight ===
Roche (ロシェ, Roshe)
Roche is a sadistic witch who belongs to the Ladies of Midnight (真夜中の貴婦人, Mayonaka no Kifujin), a coven that worships the Deity of the Night. Upon learning that a girl named Diana is the host of their leader, she and her fellow witch Elise temporarily joined forces with Elstri and her party in order to seek an audience with the child. Her gift is the Flames of Sin, which allows her to summon fires to burn her enemies with, and the fire grows exponentially based on the amount of her target's sins.
Elise (エリゼ, Erize)
Elise is a reserved witch belonging to the Ladies of Midnight, who joins Roche on the mission to scout Diana. Her gift allows her to manipulate her hair.
Berta (ベルタ, Beruta)
Berta, also known as Berta the Radiant (輝く者 ベルタ, Kagayakumono Beruta) is a powerful witch and a member of the Ladies of Midnight, who is said to be a match for Arkos in battle. She is also the vessel of the blood of the Deity of Night.
Madeleine (マドレーヌ, Madorēnu)
Madeleine is an older, calm witch belonging to the Ladies of Midnight, who wears an eyepatch and wields a rapier.

=== Gods and Monsters ===
Sea God (海の神, Umi no Kami)
The Sea God appears to be an octopus monster that dwells in the Alode Zone. Her presence is summoned above the surface whenever human sacrifices are made to the ocean, and in exchange for receiving her own sacrifice, she will grant one person a single wish, and Julian receives the lives and powers of the 100 slaves by the monster granting his wish. In the past, she had granted the Supreme Lord his blessing centuries ago. As a result, she played an important role in his country's history, as the Supreme Lord utilized his blessing to govern his people and subsequently passed down his power to his descendants, with nearly all gifted ones in the country being of royal heritage.
Demonic Beast (魔獣, Majū)
The Demonic Beast is a forest-dwelling monster that usually has the appearance of a giant, multiple dog-headed monster with humanoid appendages and no eyes, who is capable of human speech and thinking, as well as shape-shifting into a smaller, battle-oriented humanoid tree-like form.
Vulja (ヴュリヤ, Vyuriya) / Deity of the Night (夜の神, Yoru no Kami)
Vulja, more commonly known as the Deity of the Night is a three-headed goddess who decided to descend to the mortal world 400 years ago, after which she was toppled and her immortal and mutilated body resides in the Supreme Lord's domain. Her power was split into five pieces, with Lalawag being the vessel for her bones, Berta being the vessel for her blood, Rif la Scyrus being the vessel of her organs, while she resides within Diana, as the girl was born as the vessel for her heart and the vessels are the only individuals capable of perceiving and hearing her. Her influence has determined Diana's fate as the Child of Prophecy, as Elstri claims that she will influence her to be the one destined to unleash chaos upon the world.

== Publication ==
Centuria is written and illustrated by Tohru Kuramori. It began serialization in Shueisha's Shōnen Jump+ app and website on April 8, 2024. Shueisha has compiled its chapters into individual tankōbon volumes. The first volume was released on July 4, 2024. As of October 2026, ten volumes have been released.

The series is simultaneously published in English on Shueisha's Manga Plus platform. In June 2025, Viz Media announced that they had licensed the series for English publication beginning in Q2 2026.

=== Volumes ===
No.	Original release date	Original ISBN	English release date	English ISBN
1	July 4, 2024	978-4-08-884102-1	February 17, 2026	978-1-9747-6262-0
1. "100 Slaves" (100人の奴隷, Hyaku-nin no Dorei); 2. "Sea Demons" (海魔, Kaima); 3. "Fateful Encounter" (出会い, Deai); 4. "Villagers" (村人, Murabito)
2	October 4, 2024	978-4-08-884225-7	May 19, 2026	978-1-9747-6314-6
5. "Prophecy" (予言, Yogen); 6. "Demonic Beast" (魔獣, Majū); 7. "Hunting" (狩り, Kari); 8. "To Be Human" (人として, Hito Toshite); 9. "Family" (家族, Kazoku); 10. "Wave Your Hand" (手を振って, Te o Futte); 11. "Water King" (水王, Mizuō); 12. "Day of Destiny" (運命の日, Unmei no Hi)
3	January 4, 2025	978-4-08-884339-1	August 18, 2026	978-1-9747-6510-2
13. "A World Engulfed in Flames" (燃える世界, Moeru Sekai); 14. "Why He Won't Fight" (戦わない理由, Tatakawanai Riyū); 15. "Borderline" (一線, Issen); 16. "Ironclad Guillaume" (鉄塊のギヨーム, Tekkai no Giyōmu); 17. "Iron Heart, Iron Will" (鉄の塊、鉄の心, Tetsu no Katamari, Tetsu no Kokoro); 18. "The Future as Foreseen" (見た通りの「未来」, Mita Tōri no 'Mirai'); 19. "The Destroyer and the Guardian" (破壊者と守護者, Hakai-sha to Shugo-sha); 20. "A Chance Meeting" (邂逅, Kaigō); 21. "A Wave Goodbye" (手を振ってさよならを, Te o Futte Sayonara o)
4	April 4, 2025	978-4-08-884468-8	November 17, 2026	978-1-9747-6554-6
22. "Julian vs Arkos" (ユリアン VS アルコス, Yurian VS Arukosu); 23. "99"; 24. "Trump Card" (奥の手, Oku no Te); 25. "Lord of the Sea" (海の主, Umi no Omo); 26. "Mother and Child" (母と子, Haha to Ko); 27. "First Words" (はじめての言葉, Hajimete no Kotoba); 28. "A Feast for Four" (4人分の食事, Yonninbun no Shokuji); 29. "The Royal Palace" (王宮, Ōkyū); 30. "Departure" (旅立ち, Tabidachi)
5	July 4, 2025	978-4-08-884590-6	February 16, 2027	978-1-9747-1660-9
31. "Lukas" (ルーカス, Rukasu); 32. "Woman of Water" (水の女, Mizu no Onna); 33. "Julian vs Lacrima" (ユリアン VS ラクリマ, Yurian VS Rakurima); 34. "Julian vs Lacrima 2" (ユリアン VS ラクリマ②, Yurian VS Rakurima②); 35. "Dining Table" (食卓, Shokutaku); 36. "Aqueduct" (水路, Suiro); 37. "Cursed by Blood" (血の呪い, Chi no Noroi); 38. "Before the Storm" (嵐の前の, Arashi no Mae no); 39. "Child and Mother" (子と母, Ko to Haha); 40. "Inner Flames" (内なる炎, Uchinaru Honō)
6	October 3, 2025	978-4-08-884718-4	—	—
41. "Three Days Later" (三日後, Mikka-go); 42. "Her Seventh Birthday" (7歳の誕生日, 7-sai no Tanjōbi); 43. "Lacrima's Resolve" (ラクリマの決意, Rakurima no Ketsui); 44. "Mortal Combat" (死闘, Shitō); 45. "Sword and Shield" (剣と盾, Ken to Tate); 46. "The Faceless Black Knight" (無貌の黒騎土, Mubō no Kuro Kishi); 47. "Earth and Water" (土と水, Tsuchi to Mizu); 48. "Resurrection" (再誕, Saitan); 49. "Grave Robber Helem" (「屍泥」のヘーレム, Shidei no Hēremu)
7	January 5, 2026	978-4-08-884823-5	—	—
50. "Mortal Combat 2" (死闘②, Shitō②); 51. "Mortal Combat 3" (死闘③, Shitō③); 52. "Second" (二つ目の, Futatsu-me no); 53. "A Chance Meeting 2" (邂逅②, Kaigō②); 54. "Juncture" (刹那, Setsuna); 55. "A Reason to Smile" (笑顔の理由, Egao no Riyū); 56. "A Resolute Fist" (覚悟のこぶし, Kakugo no Kobushi); 57. "Memento Mori" (遺髪, Ihatsu); 58. "The Man At The Bottom Of The Sea" (海の底の誰か, Umi no Soko no Dareka)
8	April 3, 2026	978-4-08-885011-5	—	—
59. "Night" (夜, Yoru); 60. "98"; 61. "Three Against One" (3対1, 3 tai 1); 62. "The Flames of Sin" (罪の炎, Tsumi no Honō); 63. "The One Who Rises" (浮かびくる者, Ukabikuru Mono); 64. "A Soul of Sin" (罪の魂, Tsumi no Tamashī); 65. "Orthros the Reflector" (《鏡面》のオルトロス, "Kyōmen" no Orutorosu); 66. "Hundred-Fold Power, Liquidation, and Absolute Defense" (百人力×液体化×絶対防御, Hyakuninriki × Ekitai-ka × Zettai Bōgyo); 67. "100"
9	July 3, 2026	978-4-08-885127-3	—	—
68. "Merely" (ただの, Tadano); 69. "Life in the Mud" (泥の命, Doro no Inochi); 70. "Sure Bet" (本命, Honmei); 71. "A Dull Mane" (くすんだたてがみ, Kusunda Tategami); 72. "The False Siblings" (偽りの兄妹, Itsuwari no Kyōdai); 73. "Baseless Guilt" (謂れなき罪, Iware naki tsumi); 74. "Present" (贈り物, Okurimono); 75. "The Iris Stratum" (天弓の階層, Īrisu no Kaisō); 76. "Witch Hunt" (魔女の討伐, Majo no Tōbatsu)
10	October 2, 2026	978-4-08-885215-7	—	—
77. "Of Gods and Men" (神と人, Kami to Hito); 78. "Atoria" (アトリア, Atoria); 79. "Facing the Truth" (向き合い方, Mukiaikata); 80. "Life at the Helem Residence" (ヘーレム邸の暮らし, Hēremu-tei no Kurashi); 81. "Auntie Mona" (モナおばさん, Mona Obasan); 82. "My God, My Destroyer" (私の破壊者, Watashi no Hakaisha); 83. "Web of Convoluted Intentions" (錯綜する思惑, Sakusō suru Omowaku); 84. "Duel" (決闘, Kettō); 85. "The Unholy City" (不浄都市, Fujō Toshi); 86. "Letter of Challenge" (果し状, Hatashijō)

=== Chapters not yet in tankōbon format ===
These chapters have yet to be published in a tankōbon volume.

87. "One Arm" (片腕, Kataude)
88. "Divine Vessel" (神体保持者, Shintai Hojisha)
89. "Propagation" (増殖, Zōshoku)
90. "Ever-Expanding Multitudes" (増えんゆく者, Fuenyuku Mono)
91. "The Prince of Rummir" (西の国の王子, Rumiru no Ouji)
92. "The Accursed Battalion" (呪骸隊, Jugaitai)
93. "Strength of Will" (意志の強さ, Ishi no Tsuysa)
94. "A Familiar Pressure" (似た圧, Nita Atsu)
95. "A Cursed Countenance" (呪いの相貌, Noroi no Sōbō)
96. "The Shield Gift" (『盾』の異能, Tate no Inō)
97. "True Face" (本当の顔, Hontō no Kao)
98. "Lukas vs Voidmarcher" (ルーカス VS 空渡り, Rūkasu VS uro Watari)
99. "The Forest of Blood and Guts" (血と臓物の森, Chi to Zōmotsu no Mori)
100. "Phantom Spear" (魔槍, Masō)
101. "Bones and Organs" (「骨」と「内臓」, Hone to Naizō)
102. "Leave It to Me" (任せろ, Makasero)
103. "Diana's Resolve" (ディアナの決意, Diana no Ketsui)
104. "Ceodric's Gift" (セオドリクの異能, Seodoriku no Inō)
105. "The Sacrificial Battalion" (贄部隊, Nie Butai)
106. "Hollow Life" (偽りの人生, Itsuwari no Jinsei)
107. "Frustration" (苛立ち, Iradachi)
108. "The Former Prince and the Former Slave" (元王子と元奴隷, Moto Ōji to Moto Dorei)

== Reception ==
Vanessa Piña of Screen Rant highlighted the significant influence of Berserk on Centuria, particularly praising its art and monster designs.

The manga was nominated for the 2024 Next Manga Awards in the Best Web Manga category and ranked seventh out of 69 nominees. It was also nominated for the 2025 edition in the same category and ranked second. The series was ranked tenth in AnimeJapan's "Manga We Want to See Animated" poll in 2026.

The series has been recommended by manga creators Tatsuki Fujimoto (for whom Kuramori worked as an assistant) and Yukinobu Tatsu.
