= Hero Organization =

Japanese manga series

- First tankōbon volume cover, featuring Ryu (left) and Leonidas Tyler (right)

英雄機関 (Eiyū Kikan)
- Genre: Action; Mecha; Science fiction
- Manga
- Written by: Kei Saikawa
- Illustrated by: Akira Takahashi
- Published by: Shueisha
- Imprint: Jump Comics+
- Magazine: Shōnen Jump+
- Original run: September 15, 2024 – present
- Volumes: 7

Hero Organization (Japanese: 英雄機関, Hepburn: Eiyū Kikan) is a Japanese manga series written by Kei Saikawa and illustrated by Akira Takahashi. It began serialization on Shueisha's Shōnen Jump+ manga service in September 2024.

== Plot ==
The series is set in a near-future where humanity is close to extinction from environmental destruction. As a result, humanity resorts to go to space and find a new place to settle, but they are met by unfamiliar creatures known as Star Beasts. In order to curb the threat of Star Beasts, humanity creates giant robots known as Armor for Intergalactic Guardian and Interstellar Survival (AIGIS). Soldiers who pilot these robots are referred to as "Heroes".

The series initially focuses on Ryu Tyler, a man who works a manufacturing job developing AIGIS and dotes on his son Leonidas. Unlike his son who is considered a prodigy due to his proficiency for VR mech battles, Ryu is an ordinary man who wanted to be a Hero, but gave up on his dream. One day, he's invited by the Hero Organization to take a test to become a civilian AIGIS pilot in space, he's initially hesitant about taking the test due to the likelihood of failure, but decides to go in order to prove his worth to Leo. He passes the test and asks Leo if he could wait a year until he returns home. Leo accepts and moves in with his aunt's family.

During Ryu's stint with the Hero Organization, he notices that the mechs that civilian pilots use are outdated, and that civilian pilots tend to suffer from grave injuries due to battle. As soon he files a request for discharge in order to reunite with his son, a Star Beast attacks a transport ship. Ryu later volunteers to take out the Star Beast and protect the transport ship. He ultimately succeeds, but is executed by the Hero Organization in order to frame him as a hero who died in battle.

The series later shifts focus to Ryu's son Leonidas, several years after Ryu's death, Leo joins East Point Academy to live out his dream of becoming an AIGIS pilot. Leo is also aware of the circumstances of his father's death and plots his revenge on the Hero Organization.

== Publication ==
Written by Kei Saikawa and illustrated by Akira Takahashi, Hero Organization began serialization on Shueisha's Shōnen Jump+ manga service on September 15, 2024. Its chapters have been compiled into seven tankōbon volumes as of October 2026.

The series' chapters are simultaneously published in English on Shueisha's Manga Plus app.

No.	Release date	ISBN
1	February 4, 2025	978-4-08-884445-9
2	March 4, 2025	978-4-08-884448-0
3	June 4, 2025	978-4-08-884605-7
4	October 3, 2025	978-4-08-884757-3
5	February 4, 2026	978-4-08-885016-0
6	June 4, 2026	978-4-08-885159-4
7	October 2, 2026	978-4-08-885256-0

== Reception ==
The series was nominated for the eleventh Next Manga Awards in 2025 in the digital category, and was ranked twentieth.
