= Mitama Security =

Japanese manga series by Tsurun Hatomune

- Mitama Security: Spirit Busters
- First tankōbon volume cover, featuring Rena Haze and Joh Mitama

ミタマセキュ霊ティ (Mitama Sekyureti)
- Genre: Action, comedy, supernatural
- Manga
- Written by: Tsurun Hatomune
- Published by: Shueisha
- English publisher: NA: Viz Media
- Imprint: Jump Comics
- Magazine: Weekly Shōnen Jump
- Original run: September 2, 2019 – August 11, 2020
- Volumes: 5
- icon

Mitama Security: Spirit Busters (Japanese: ミタマセキュ霊ティ, Hepburn: Mitama Sekyureti) is a Japanese manga series written and illustrated by Tsurun Hatomune. It was serialized in Shueisha's Weekly Shōnen Jump magazine from September 2019 to August 2020, and collected into five tankōbon volumes. Viz Media licensed the series for a digital-only English release in North America.

== Plot ==
Rena Haze is a high school student in Tokyo who is able to see spirits and has a line of about 100 following her around everywhere she goes. One day, she runs into Joh Mitama, an agent of Secureity (セキュ霊ティ; rei means "ghost" or "spirit" in Japanese), a government-recognized organization whose job it is to exorcise spirits using psychic energy. Mitama decides to move in next door to Rena and vows to protect her from spirits, but it turns out he is afraid of ghosts.

== Characters ==
Joh Mitama (御霊 浄, Mitama Jō)
A Secureity professional, who despite being one of the best at his job of exorcising spirits, is afraid of them. When he cries, his psychic powers increase and he is able to overcome his fear. Despite his abysmal work as an exorcist, he is a very skilled basketball player and cook.
Rena Haze (羽瀬 玲奈)
A first-year high school student, Rena has naturally attracted spirits since she was born and currently has about 100 with her at all times. The spirits that follow her, and whom she gives names to, are typically friendly and help her with various tasks. Although she lives with her mother, Rena is usually alone due to her mother's long work hours.
Soya Kurosu (黒須 奏也, Kurosu Sōya)
A Secureity agent who attended its Treining Institute with Mitama. Despite being a Secureity professional and graduating at the top of his class, Soya has no spirit sense and is unable to see them. He worked a desk job at headquarters until being dispatched when Mitama reported on Rena and her 100 spirits. Like Mitama, Soya moves in next door to Rena.
Janca Takenouchi (竹之内 ジャンカ, Takenouchi Janka)
A collector of rare and powerful spirits that he then uses in battle. He often punctuates his phrases with "jan k'now?" After unsuccessfully trying several times to capture Rena's spirits, he realizes the error of his ways and moves next door to Rena as well in hope of learning how to peacefully bond with spirits under her tutorship. He is often accompanied by Shakejiro (シヤケ次郎, Shiyake Jirō), an affable and opportunistic humanoid salmon spirit who secretly schemes a plot to turn the world into his Salmon Empire.

== Production ==
According to Junichi Tamada, the editor of the manga who has worked with Tsurun Hatomune since 2011, Mitama Security: Spirit Busters was influenced by the comedy duo Waraimeshi and their double-boke style of manzai. Hatomune said he was originally going to title the series Atchi ni Itte ku Rei (あっちに行ってく霊), but is grateful that Tamada stopped him.

== Publication ==
Mitama Security: Spirit Busters is written and illustrated by Tsurun Hatomune. It started in the 2019 40th issue of Shueisha's Weekly Shōnen Jump, published on September 2, 2019. The series finished in the 2020 combined 36th-37th issue of Weekly Shōnen Jump, published on August 11, 2020. A spinoff chapter was published on Shōnen Jump+ on August 31, 2020. Shueisha has compiled its chapters into five individual tankōbon volumes, released from February 4 to October 2, 2020.

Both Shueisha and Viz Media began releasing the series in English digitally the same day it began in Japan, the former on its Manga Plus website and application. Viz later released the collected volumes digitally, releasing all five volumes on December 28, 2021.

=== Volumes ===
No.	Original release date	Original ISBN	English release date	English ISBN
1	February 4, 2020	978-4-08-882172-6	December 28, 2021	978-1-9747-1719-4
01. "The Man Called Joh Mitama"; 02. "Slam!"; 03. "Cooking"; 04. "His Classmate Is a Speat Wielder"; 05. "Haunted by Love"; 06. "Tempting Tapioca"; 07. "Great Detective Kojime"; 08. "Grow, Terror, Grow!"; 09. "To the Exorcism Site"; Bonus Code. "The Origins of Mitama Security"
2	March 4, 2020	978-4-08-882226-6	December 28, 2021	978-1-9747-3096-4
10. "JANCA"; 11. "His Master Wears Stripes"; 12. "Roots"; 13. "Love and REIjection"; 14. "A Day in the Life of Rena, Explained!"; 15. "The Return of Kojime"; 16. "The Nursing Championship"; 17. "The Lost Little Boy"; 18. "Play Ball"; 19. "White-Hot Baseball"; Bonus Code 1; Bonus Code 2
3	June 4, 2020	978-4-08-882326-3	December 28, 2021	978-1-9747-3097-1
20. "BODY's Big Catch"; 21. "The Tearful Greit Play"; 22. "Revenge, Ja'Know"; 23. "The Day"; 24. "Building the Salmon Empire"; 25. "Let's Go to the Public Bath"; 26. "Rena Haze's Heart-Pounding Job Interview"; 27. "Joh's Crisis"; 28. "Dark Past"; 29. "The Kojime Who Comes Twice Will Come Thrice"
4	August 4, 2020	978-4-08-882397-3	December 28, 2021	978-1-9747-3098-8
30. "Rena Haze's Heart-Pounding Job"; 31. "All Stars! The Big Line Tryouts"; 32. "Making No Concessions"; 33. "Investigation! The Karaoke Club of Fear"; 34. "Let the Games Begin! The Mom Championship"; 35. "Janca's Jam"; 36. "Sudden Hide-and-Seek"; 37. "Where's Joh?"; 38. "Climb! Securei Tower"; 39. "History's Most Notorious Evil-Spirit User, Popoki"
5	October 2, 2020	978-4-08-882469-7	December 28, 2021	978-1-9747-3099-5
40. "Encounter"; 41. "Holy Light Spirit Man"; 42. "Holy Light Spirit Man, Explained!"; 43. "Pull Through! The Parent-Teacher-Student Conference"; 44. "Lonely, Lonely Sunshine"; 45. "Enjoy! Spirit Photography"; 46. "Ta and Pi, Runaways"; 47. "A New Chapter"; One-Shot 1. "A Naked Swan, Part 1"; One-Shot 2. "A Naked Swan, Part 2"; Bonus Code. "Mitama vs. the Swan"

== Reception ==
In 2020, Mitama Security: Spirit Busters was nominated for the 6th Next Manga Awards and placed 13th out of the 50 nominees with 11,686 votes. Jacob Buchalter of Comic Book Resources praised the series for great visual gags and "pretty good" art, but said the humor is stuff that has been seen before and "there's only so many times a guy can get scared of ghosts." Real Sound's Reiichi Narima described Mitama Security as an occult gag comedy, where all of the characters get more interesting as the series goes on.
