= Make the Exorcist Fall in Love =

Japanese manga series

- Cover of the first volume

エクソシストを堕とせない (Ekusoshisuto o Otosenai)
- Genre: Action, romantic comedy
- Manga
- Written by: Aruma Arima
- Illustrated by: Masuku Fukayama
- Published by: Shueisha
- Imprint: Jump Comics+
- Magazine: Shōnen Jump+
- Original run: December 15, 2021 – present
- Volumes: 16

Make the Exorcist Fall in Love (Japanese: エクソシストを堕とせない, Hepburn: Ekusoshisuto o Otosenai) is a Japanese manga series written by Aruma Arima and illustrated by Masuku Fukayama. It began serialization on Shueisha's Shōnen Jump+ manga website in December 2021. As of November 2026, the series' individual chapters have been collected into sixteen volumes.

== Plot summary ==
Make the Exorcist Fall in Love centers around an initially unnamed young priest (referred to simply as Mr. Priest by various characters), who from birth has been trained and abused by the Catholic Church to defeat demons, to the point that he follows the Bible literally and plucks out his own eye while fighting Asmodeus, the demon of lust. Advised by the priest's mentor that he is too self-sacrificial, the Church receives a message from Satan stating that he intends for the creator of "The Gallery of Evil"—an art exhibition featuring demons falling in love—to visit him in Gehenna. The priest is tasked by the Church to protect the artist, Imuri Atsuki, unaware that she is a succubus sent by Satan to fool the priest into falling in love with her, a goal that holds more challenges than it seems.

== Characters ==
Mr. Priest (神父くん, Shinpu-kun)
Voiced by: Soma Saito (2022 commercial)
A 16 year old exorcist whose name is unknown. Raised as an orphan in a monastery, he endured continuous abuse and harsh training until another exorcist took him in. Regarded as the strongest exorcist, he possesses the ability to amplify and manifest Bible verses. Prior to the story, he had already repelled three of the seven demons named after seven deadly sins. While deeply devout in his Catholic faith, he has a sensitive side and prefers spending time cooking in the kitchen over exorcising. Consequently, he agrees to take on a mission to Japan to protect Imuri in an effort to understand the true meaning of love.
Imuri Atsuki (愛月 イムリ, Atsuki Imuri)
Voiced by: Rie Takahashi (2022 commercial)
An 18 year old painter, she is cheerful and casual with others. Despite dropping out of high school, her income ranks in the top 3% in Japan. Her artwork themed around "demons in love" is renowned worldwide, which leads to her being targeted by demons and placed under the protection of Mr. Priest. Her true identity is lilin, the first original succubus. Although devoid of demonic magic, she was tasked by Satan to ensure his resurrection by making Mr. Priest fall in love and fall from grace. However, she secretly believes that humans and demons can coexist, and she gradually develops feelings for Mr. Priest's reckless devotion to protecting her and others.

== Publication ==
Written by Aruma Arima and illustrated by Masuku Fukayama, the series began serialization on Shueisha's Shōnen Jump+ manga website on December 15, 2021. As of November 2026, the series' individual chapters have been collected into sixteen tankōbon volumes.

Shueisha's Manga Plus service is publishing the series in English digitally.

=== Volumes ===
No.	Japanese release date	Japanese ISBN
1	May 2, 2022	978-4-08-883138-1
01. "Love Thy Neighbor" (汝の隣人を愛せよ, Nanji no Rinjin o Aiseyo); 02. "Make the Exorcist Fall in Love" (エクソシストを堕とせない, Ekusoshisuto o Otosenai); 03. "Femme Fetal" (ファムファタール, Famu Fatāru); 04. "Mammon" (マモン, Mamon); 05. "The Battle Begins" (開戦, Kaisen)
2	July 4, 2022	978-4-08-883174-9
06. "The Day of Wrath" (怒りの日, Ikari no Hi); 07. "Masculinity" (マチズモ, Machizumo); 08. "Sic Transit Gloria Mundi" (盛者必衰, Jōshahissui); 09. "The Left Hand of Darkness" (闇の左手, Yami no Hidarite); 10. "Ripple" (さざ波, Sazanami); 11. "Sisters" (シスターズ, Shisutāzu); 12. "Drifting Ashore" (漂着, Hyōchaku); 13. "Mother of the Sea" (母なる海, Hahanaru Umi)
3	October 4, 2022	978-4-08-883266-1
14. "The Great Beasts of the Sea" (海の大いなる獣, Umi no Ōinaru Kemono); 15. "Leviathan" (リバイアサン, Ribaiasan); 16. "Ode to Joy" (歓喜の歌, Kanki no Uta); 17. "For Whom the Bell Tolls" (誰がのために鐘は鳴る, Dare ga no Tameni Kane ha Naru); 18. "The Seething Parasite" (腹の虫, Hara no Mushi); 19. "A Can of Worms" (虫の知らせ, Mushi no Shirase); 20. "Comedy, Part 1" (コメディ ①, Komedi ①); 21. "Comedy, Part 2" (コメディ ②, Komedi ②)
4	February 3, 2023	978-4-08-883375-0
22. "Where Insects Lie" (虫の居所, Mushi no Idokoro); 23. "Pupa" (蛹, Sanagi); 24. "The Creeps" (虫酸, Mushizu); 25. "Worm-Eaten" (虫食む, Mushibamu); 26. "Lord of the Flies" (蝿の王, Hae no Ō); 26.5. "Fly Heavenward" (天道虫, Tentōmushi); 27. "A Flea's Courage" (蚤の心臓, Nomi no Shinzō); 28. "Beelzebub" (ベルゼブル, Beruzeburu)
5	June 2, 2023	978-4-08-883517-4
29. "Squirm" (蠢く, Ugomeku); 30. "Butterfly" (蝶々, Chōchō); 31. "Like a Moth to a Flame" (愚人は夏の虫, Gujin wa Natsu no Mushi); 32. "Silkworm" (蚕, Kaiko); 33. "To a Fly" (蠅が手をすり足をする, Hae ga te o Suriashi wo Suru); 34. "Holy Communion" (聖餐, Seisan); 35. "Because We're Alive" (生きてこそ, Ikitekoso); 36. "Huh??" (あ？？, A??)
6	September 4, 2023	978-4-08-883637-9
37. "Pandora" (パンドラ, Pandora); 38. "Rabbit Hole" (兎の穴, Usagi no Ana); 39. "Mikhail" (ミハイル, Mihairu); 40. "Haughty Arrogance" (傲り高ぶり, Ogori Takaburi); 41. "Stain" (汚れ, Yogore); 42. "Turbulence" (坩堝, Rutsubo); 43. "Masses of Trash ①" (有象無象塵芥 ①, Uzoumuzou Jinkai ①); 44. "Ignorance" (蒙昧, Mōmai)
7	January 4, 2024	978-4-08-883779-6
45. "Lock and Load" (火蓋, Hibuta); 46. "First At-Bat" (先攻, Senkō); 47. "Second At-Bat" (後攻, Kōkō); 48. "If I Could Go Back" (もしもあの時, Moshimo ano Toki); 49. "Evil Plan" (姦計, Kankei); 50. "Asmodeus" (アスモデウス, Asumodeusu); 51. "Unlocked" (開錠, Kaijō); 52. "Omnipotent" (全能, Zen'nō)
8	June 4, 2024	978-4-08-884030-7
53. "Sunset" (日没, Nichibotsu); 54. "Disaster" (厄災, Yakusai); 55. "The End of Adolescence" (幼年期の終わり, Yōnenki no Owari); 56. "Come out, come out!" (おーいでてこーい, Oidetekoi); 57. "Wheel" (車輪, Sharin); 58. "My Dear Boy" (僕の少年, Boku no Shōnen); 59. "Triad of Vows" (選手宣誓, Senshu Sensei); 60. "The Ark of Mud" (泥の方舟, Doro no Hakobune)
9	September 4, 2024	978-4-08-884179-3
61. "Time Off" (暇, Itoma); 62. "The Final Tranquility" (最後の平穏, Saigo no Heion); 63. "Raid" (強襲, Kyōshū); 64. "The Ancient Witch" (古の魔女, Inishie no Majo); 65. "Counterattack" (反撃, Hangeki); 66. "Child's Play" (児戯, Jigi); 67. "Planet of the Apes" (猿の惑星, Saru no Wakusei); 68. "Please, no more" (もういいよ, Mou Iiyo); 69. "Fleeing from Gethsemane" (ゲッセマネからの逃走, Gessemane Kara no Tōsō)
10	January 4, 2025	978-4-08-884331-5
70. "Clowns" (ピエロたち, Piero-tachi); 71. "Egoistical" (勝手, Katte); 72. "Imuri" (イムリ, Imuri); 73. "Artist of Love" (恋の画家, Koi no Gaka); 74. "Blood Bond" (血の楔, Chi no Kusabi); 75. "Be fruitful, multiply, and replenish the Earth" (生めよ、ふえよ、地に満ちよ, Umeyo, Fueyo, Chi ni Michiyo); 76. "Beyond Reason" (論外, Rongai); 77. "Awakening" (目覚め, Mezame)
11	April 4, 2025	978-4-08-884461-9
78. "Belphegor" (ベルフェゴール, Berufegōru); 79. "Comedy, Part 3" (コメディ ③, Komedi ③); 80. "Life is Wonderful!" (素晴らしき哉、人生, Subarashiki Kana, Jinsei); 81. "Comedy, Part 4" (コメディ ④, Komedi ④); 82. "The Finale" (大詰め, Ōdzume); 83. "Hell" (地獄, Jigoku); 84. "Restart" (リスタート, Risutāto); 85. "Departure" (旅立ち, Tabidachi)
12	August 4, 2025	978-4-08-884617-0
86. "Gate" (門, Mon); 87. "A Light in the Darkness" (灯火, Tomoshibi); 88. "Compensation" (代償, Daishō); 89. "Unsettled" (不穩, Fuon); 90. "The Rebel" (反逆者, Hangyaku-sha); 91. "Fishing" (漁(すなど)り, Sunadori); 92. "Transformation" (変容, Henyō); 93. "Let There Be Light" (光あれ, Hikari Are)
13	December 4, 2025	978-4-08-884783-2
94. "Shadow" (陰り, Kageri); 95. "The Eighth One" (8人目, 8 Ninme); 96. "Lucifer" (ルシファー, Rushifā); 97. "Masses of Trash, Part 2" (有象無象塵芥 ②, Uzoumuzou Jinkai 2); 98. "The End of a Journey" (旅の終わり, Tabi no Owari); 99. "Huh?!" (は???, Ha???); 100. "Make the Exorcist Fall in Love"; 101. "All's Well That Ends Well" (終わりよければすべてよし, Owari Yokereba Subete yo Shi)
14	March 4, 2026	978-4-08-884876-1
102. "Vasilisa the Beautiful" (うるわしのワシリーサ, Uruwashi no Washirīsa); 103. "Baba Yaga's Hut" (バーバヤーガの小屋, Bāba Yāga no Koya); 104. "Speech" (演説, Enzetsu); 105. "Discord" (不和, Fuwa); 106. "Tragedy" (トラジディー, Torajidī); 107. "Seated" (着席, Chakuseki); 108. "Infiltration" (侵入, Shinnyū); 109. "Crushing Defeat" (完敗, Kanpai)
15	July 3, 2026	978-4-08-885119-8
110. "Memory" (記憶, Kioku); 111. "Destruction" (破壊, Hakai); 112. "Is Trust A Sin?" (信頼は罪なりや, Shinrai wa Tsuminariya); 113. "Anti-Heroine" (アンチヒロイン, Anchihiroin); 114. "A Single Shot" (一矢, Isshi); 115. "The End" (結末, Ketsumatsu); 116. "Silence" (沈黙, Chinmoku); 117. "Playing Hero" (ヒーロごっこ, Hīro-gokko)
16	November 4, 2026	978-4-08-885245-4
118. "The Final Battle" (決戦, Kessen); 119. "Longing" (憧憬, Shoukei); 120. "Cry Out" (叫び, Sakebi); 121. "Blessing" (祝福, Shukufuku); 122. "Lop, Dash, Snatch!!" (奪首・ダッシュ・奪取!!, Datsukubi Dasshu Dasshu!!); 123. "Tragedy 2" (トラジディー ②, Torajidī 2); 124. "Tragedy 3" (トラジディー ③, Torajidī 3); 125. "Fetal Movement" (胎動, Taidō)

=== Chapters not yet in tankōbon format ===
These chapters have yet to be published in a tankōbon volume.

- 126. "Final Boss" (ラスボス, Rasu Bosu)
- 127. "Demons" (悪魔たち, Akuma-tachi)
- 128. "The Moon's Other Half" (片割れ月, Katawarezuki)
- 129. "The First Woman" (最初の女, Saisho no Onna)

== Reception ==
Reiichi Naruma from Real Sound praised the story, artwork, characters, and setting, particularly enjoying both the action and romance elements of the story. Steven Blackburn from Screen Rant favorably compared the series to Witch Watch, stating that Make the Exorcist Fall in Love's romantic moments and character dynamics were better than those found in Witch Watch.

The series was nominated for the 2022 Next Manga Award in the web manga category, and ranked ninth out of 50 nominees.
