= Shiba Inu Rooms =

Japanese manga series

- First tankōbon volume cover

シバつき物件 (Shibatsuki Bukken)
- Genre: Comedy; Slice of life; Supernatural
- Manga
- Written by: Esu Omori
- Published by: Shueisha
- English publisher: NA: Viz Media
- Imprint: Jump Comics+
- Magazine: Shōnen Jump+
- Original run: June 27, 2024 – present
- Volumes: 9
- Anime television series
- Directed by: Osamu Yamasaki
- Studio: TMS Entertainment
- Original run: Q3 2027 – scheduled
- icon

Shiba Inu Rooms (Japanese: シバつき物件, Hepburn: Shibatsuki Bukken) is a Japanese manga series written and illustrated by Esu Omori. It was originally published as a one-shot on Shueisha's Shōnen Jump+ manga service in July 2023. It later began serialization on the same service in June 2024. An anime television series adaptation produced by TMS Entertainment is set to premiere in Q3 2027.

== Plot ==
Kori Momose moves into a brand new apartment that is rumored to be haunted. She moves in due to the rent being cheap, and later discovers a Shiba Inu ghost named Mu-chan. Due to being a horror fan, Kori can handle being around ghosts, but she cannot handle being around dogs, and tries to spoil Mu-chan so he can pass on.

== Characters ==
Kori Momose (百瀬 氷, Momose Kōri)
Voiced by: Niina Nakabayashi
Mu (むう, Mū)
Voiced by: Mutsumi Tamura

== Media ==
=== Manga ===
Written and illustrated by Esu Omori, Shiba Inu Rooms was originally published as a one-shot on Shueisha's Shōnen Jump+ manga service on July 22, 2023. It later began serialization on the same service on June 27, 2024. Its chapters have been collected into nine tankōbon volumes as of November 2026.

The series' chapters are simultaneously published in English on Viz Media's Shonen Jump service and on Shueisha's Manga Plus service. In January 2025, Viz Media announced that they would release the series volumes digitally in Q4 2025. Viz later announced that a print release would be scheduled for Q4 2026.

No.	Original release date	Original ISBN	English release date	English ISBN
1	September 4, 2024	978-4-08-884247-9	September 1, 2026	978-1-9747-6681-9
1. "Shackled Shiba" (シバられた犬, Shiba-rareta Inu); 2. "Poor Little Creature" (かわいそうなやつ, Kawaisou na Yatsu); 3. "I Don't Understand You" (君のことがわからない, Kimi no Koto ga Wakaranai); 4. "Consideration for Others" (気を遣わせる存在, Ki o Tsukawaseru Sonzai); 5. "Repaying a Favor" (差し入れのお返し, Sashi'ire no Okaeshi); Bonus Manga: "A New Dog Bed" (あたらしいねどこ, Atarashī Nedoko)
2	December 4, 2024	978-4-08-884321-6	November 3, 2026	978-1-9747-6682-6
6. "Friends" (ともだち, Tomodachi); 7. "My Good Qualities" (私のいいところ, Watashi no Ītokoro); 8. "The Absolute Coolest" (かっこいいよ, Kakkoī yo); 9. "Huh?" (あれ？, Are?); 10. "Escape" (脱走, Dassou); 11. "His First Errand" (はじめてのおつかい, Hajimete no Otsukai); Bonus Manga 1: "A New Water Bowl" (あたらしい水入れ, Atarashī Mizuire); Bonus Manga 2: "A New Cushion Cover" (あたらしいクッションカバー, Atarashī Kusshon Kabā)
3	March 4, 2025	978-4-08-884480-0	January 5, 2027	978-1-9747-6683-3
12. "Scaredy Ghosts" (こわがりなおばけたち, Kowagari na Obake tachi); 13. "Biggest Fans" (推しつ推されつ, Oshitsu Osaretsu); 14. "The Owner Test" (飼い主テスト, Kainushi Tesuto); 15. "Bittersweet Partings" (ひきこもごも, Hikikomogomo); 16. "Meeting Her Dad" (父へのあいさつ, Chichi he no Aisatsu); 17. "First Dreams & First Loves" (初夢と初恋, Hatsuyume to Hatsukoi); Side Story: "The Names of the Jiba" (ジバたちの名前, Jiba tachi no Namae); Bonus Manga: "New Face" (あたらしいかお, Atarashī Kao)
4	July 4, 2025	978-4-08-884688-0	—	—
18. "Dreams for the Future" (叶えたい将来, Kanaetai Shourai); 19. "A Night Without You" (君のいない夜, Kimi no Inai Yoru); 20. "I Want Chocolate!" (チョコがほしい, Choko ga Hoshī); 21. "A Strange Dog" (へんな犬, Hen na Inu); 22. "Ink and Shadow" (スミとヤミ, Sumi to Yami); 23. "An Aloof Young Man" (孤高の青年, Kokou no Seinen); Bonus Manga: "Kiri's Walk (in Room 203)" (キリ君さんぽ（203号室編）, Kiri-kun Sanpo (203 Gōshitu hen)); Side Story: "Mu-chan and Q-chan" (むうちゃんとQちゃん, Mū-chan to Kyū-chan)
5	October 3, 2025	978-4-08-884712-2	—	—
24. "Finding Their Owner" (飼い主さがし, Kainushi Sagashi); 25. "I Want to Know My Birthday" (誕生日が知りたい, Tanjoubi ga Shiritai); 26. "When We Reminisce" (思い出話をするときは, Omoidebanashi o Suru Toki wa); 27. "Kids at Heart (Part I)" (大人で子どもで（前編）, Otona de Kodomo de (Zenpen)); 28. "Kids at Heart (Part II)" (大人で子どもで（後編）, Otona de Kodomo de (Kouhen)); 29. "Let's Put on a Play!" (おしばいをしよう！, Oshibai o Shiyou!); Side Story: "Mu-chan Runs Away" (むうちゃんの家出, Mū-chan no Iede); Bonus Manga: "Which Is It?!" (どーっちだ！, Dōcchi da!)
6	January 5, 2026	978-4-08-884861-7	—	—
30. "Hikari in the Closet" (押入れの光, Oshi'ire no Hikari); 31. "Bad Dog" (わるいこ, Warui Ko); 32. "Puppy Mission" (パピーズミッション, Papīzu Misshon); 33. "But You're the One Who Hurts" (いたいのは君なのに, Itai no wa Kimi Nanoni); 34. "Stomped, Kicked, And..." (ふんだりけったりん, Fundari Kettarin); 35. "What They Wanted to Say" (伝えたかったこと, Tsutaetakatta Koto); Bonus Manga: "In Need of a Button" (ボタンのおねだり, Botan no Onedari)
7	April 3, 2026	978-4-08-885006-1	—	—
36. "To Be the King" (王者への道, Ōja he no Michi); 37. "Strangers" (知らない人, Shiranai Hito); 38. "What Kori Wants" (氷がほしいもの, Kōri ga Hoshī Mono); 39. "Milk's Secret" (ハクのひみつ, Haku no Himitsu); 40. "The Day She Dreamed Of" (夢見た日, Yumemita Hi); 41. "The Dogs Who Came Before" (生きた犬, Ikita Inu); Bonus: "Hikari and Yume's Collaborative Picture Book" (光と夢の合作絵本, Hikari to Yume no Gassaku Ehon)
8	August 4, 2026	978-4-08-885153-2	—	—
9	November 4, 2026	978-4-08-885248-5	—	—

==== Chapters not yet in tankōbon format ====
These chapters have yet to be published in a tankōbon volume.

42. "Cursed Anew" (呪い、再び, Noroi, Futatabi)
43. "Kori and Mu's Body-Swapped Lives" (氷とむうの入れ替わり生活！？, Kōri to Mū no Irekawari Seikatsu!?)
44. "Changed Hearts" (違えた心, Tagaeta Kokoro)
45. "Go, Kori, Go!" (それいけ、氷, Soreike, Kōri)
46. "Super There" (すごいいとくね, Sugoi Itoku ne)
47. "What I Couldn't Say Then" (あのとき言えなかったこと, Ano Toki Ienakatta Koto)
48. "Mom vs. Maison Shiba" (母VSメゾンシーバ！, Haha Biesu Mezon Shība!)
- Side Story: "The World from Mu's POV" (むうから見える世界, Mū kara Mieru Sekai)
- Side Story: "Santan" (サンタたん, Santa-tan)
- Side Story: "New Year's Resolutions" (新年の抱負, Shin'nen no Hōfu)

=== Anime ===
An anime television series adaptation was announced on November 1, 2026. It will be produced by TMS Entertainment and directed by Osamu Yamasaki, with character designs by Rio. The series is set to premiere in Q3 2027.

== Reception ==
The series was ranked seventh in the Nationwide Bookstore Employees' Recommended Comics list of 2025. The series was ranked fourth in the 11th Next Manga Awards in the digital category in 2025.
