= Kurumizawa's Folly =

Japanese manga series

- First tankōbon volume cover

来見沢善彦の愚行 (Kurumizawa Yoshihiko no Gukō)
- Genre: Suspense
- Manga
- Written by: Yohira Tokiwa
- Published by: Shueisha
- English publisher: NA: Viz Media
- Imprint: Jump Comics+
- Magazine: Shōnen Jump+
- Original run: September 6, 2025 – present
- Volumes: 2

Kurumizawa's Folly (Japanese: 来見沢善彦の愚行, Hepburn: Kurumizawa Yoshihiko no Gukō) is a Japanese manga series written and illustrated by Yohira Tokiwa. It began serialization on Shueisha's Shōnen Jump+ manga service in September 2025.

== Synopsis ==
Set in 1971, Yoshihiko Kurumizawa is a once famous manga artist who has pitched several ideas to his editor in order to launch a serialization, but his editor has been unsatisfied with his ideas. Out of desperation, he turns to rookie manga artist, Kensaku Hata, a young man who is a fan of Kurumizawa's work, in order to launch a serialization.

== Characters ==
=== 1971 ===
Yoshihiko Kurumizawa
A pen name initially coined by two schoolmates, Masahiko Kusumi and Yoshitaka Sawai. They both grew up admiring the work of Tetsuro Oosamu (a fictionalized version of Tezuka Osamu). Together, they created the wildly popular manga Cyber Joe, but have failed to publish another series since it ended (along with their partnership) in 1965; since then, Kusumi has taken sole possession of the Kurumizawa identity.

Kensaku Hata
A nearly illiterate 20-year-old factory worker who idolized Kurumizawa and Cyber Joe from a young age. He draws a manga between shifts at the lathe workshop. Although the art is excellent and the characters are well-written, his lack of formal education means his handwriting is illegible and filled with misspellings, proving too distracting for editors to approve the publication. One of his later ideas is published as Balal under Kurumizawa's name. While posing as Kurumizawa's assistant, he uses the assumed name Tsukasa Hasegawa.

Takeo Kojima
The Shonen Victory editor assigned to Kurumizawa. He discovers the true author of Balal early and is co-opted by Kurumizawa into silence.

Kin Sagara
The mangaka responsible for the naughty comedy No-No Dojo, one of the more popular titles currently running in Shonen Victory. Although he cultivates a public image as a carefree gadabout, he is interested in making manga a recognized literary form and uses his series as a lightning rod to divert criticism from more serious works.

Mariko Yoshikawa
One of Sagara-sensei's assistants; she is an attractive young woman. She accidentally discovers the true creator of Balal after returning a handkerchief to Kurumizawa's home.

=== 1963–1965 ===
Satoe Hata
Kensaku's kind, diligent mother. She works on the co-operative farm for both herself and her husband's sake, as he is too lazy to exert much effort; during a hot day, she dies from heat stroke.

Kyusaku Hata
Kensaku's drunk, abusive father. He is unable to cope with trauma from his past military service and lashes out at his family. After Kensaku's grandmother dies, he is committed to a sanitarium by his sister.

Tsukasa Hasegawa
Kensaku's third grade teacher. Despite his severe, intimidating appearance, he is patient and sensitive; he introduces Hata to Cyber Joe manga and anime after deducing the boy is a visual learner.

=== 1945–1952 ===
Masahiko Kusumi
A sickly schoolboy from a once-wealthy family who is a talented artist. Although his father indulges his love of manga by purchasing copies and giving them to the boy, Kusumi's mother is strict and destroys any manga she sees, believing it stunts his intellect. The family estate, which had been confiscated by the military during the war, is returned to the Kusumis in 1952, somewhat restoring their status, but Kusumi's father remains busy with rebuilding the business, leaving him in the care of the family retainer, Miss Tsuya. Kusumi is a talented artist whose main practice came from copying the works of Oosamu.

Takemi Kabayama
The neighborhood bully, who steals candy and manga from the other children and forces them to do his work. Kabayama's father admired the book The Moon Upon the Earth (Hakudo Awai) and enlisted in the army, but returned from the war with severe trauma and after abusing his family, was committed to a sanitarium in Chiba. When he learns that Sawai is Awai's son, he demands money. Although he dies after an accidental fall, Kusumi covers up his death to ensure Sawai is not blamed for it; Kusumi buries his body in a shallow grave on the Kusumi family's property.

Yoshitaka Sawai
A student who transferred from Kyushu to Kusumi's school near Tokyo. He is popular, receiving high marks and demonstrating remarkable athletic ability; when Kabayama tries to bully him, he turns the tables and beats Kabayama (and his gang). Sawai befriends Kusumi after Kusumi stands up for him; they share a love of Oosamu's manga and prove to be an effective creative partnership, with Sawai writing and Kusumi illustrating, but eventually, Sawai proves to be a more talented artist as well, feeding Kusumi's jealousy. Sawai uses a false name and allows Kusumi to be the public face of their work as "Kurumizawa" because his father, Hakudo Awai, was a famed author who died by suicide after Japan lost the war. Awai's most popular book was used as military propaganda and rapidly fell out of favor after 1945.

Mitsuko Fukahori
Nicknamed Micchan, she grew up with Kusumi, Kabayama, and Sawai, transferring to their school in 1947 with Sawai. She is Kurumizawa's self-proclaimed number one fan. Although she also claims to be from Kyushu, she is actually from Nagasaki and is slowly dying from leukemia after the bombing.

Junko Kabayama
Takemi's younger sister, who was 5 when he disappeared. She describes herself as a dull child who often was bullied, but her older brother Takemi defended her and brought her presents.

== Publication ==
Written and illustrated by Yohira Tokiwa, Kurumizawa's Folly began serialization on Shueisha's Shōnen Jump+ manga service on September 6, 2025. In November 2026, it was announced that the series would end in three chapters. Its chapters have been collected in two tankōbon volumes as of May 2026.

The series' chapters are simultaneously published in English on Shueisha's Manga Plus app, and Viz Media's Shonen Jump service.

No.	Release date	ISBN
1	December 4, 2025	978-4-08-884862-4
Chapters: 1–5
After his latest pitch is rejected, famed mangaka Yoshihiko Kurumizawa is labeled a has-been by the editors of Shonen Victory, who fear that his style and plotlines, like Tetsuro Oosama's, are hopelessly old-fashioned, as none of his ideas have been published for the last six years. Walking home, he sees a young man, Kensaku Hata, throwing a sheaf of completed manga pages off a bridge; Hata runs when he approaches, but collapses from hunger. Kurumizawa takes him to a ramen shop and asks about his work, struck by the similarity to his own style. Hata flees after the meal without learning his benefactor's name, saying that Kurumizawa the mangaka gave him a reason to live. Kurumizawa returns to collect Hata's discarded manuscript and submits it to Shonen Victory, where his editor Takeo Kojima agrees to submit it to the larger panel for evaluation. Kurumizawa tracks down Hata at the factory and meets with him, tricking the illiterate young man into signing an unfair contract by claiming that he can get Hata published in Shonen Victory; Kurumizawa offers his help to edit the story and gives Hata a studio space in his expansive house, offering to take care of his living needs as well. He plans to pass off Hata's work as his own, which he confesses to a shadowy figure over the telephone. Kurumizawa is motivated to publish again by his love for Mitsuko Fukahori, his childhood classmate who is dying from cancer. Hata's next submission Balal is accepted for publication, telling the story of the eponymous outlaw antihero; Hata proves to be a talented storyteller, praising Kurumizawa as the greatest influence in his life and demonstrating a deep understanding of his most famous work, Cyber Joe. Two months after the debut of Balal, Kurumizawa is serving as Hata's assistant and Kojima, the editor, overhears that Hata is the real author during a visit; Kurumizawa shows him how he replaces the cover on the magazines each week to trick Hata into believing he is the author, and convinces Kojima to keep their secret. However, Kojima tries to guide the series to a quick ending by accepting the chapters without his usual incisive critiques. When Hata calls him directly to correct an error and redraw the last five pages of the ninth chapter just a few hours before the publication deadline, Hata wins him over by telling him Balal is the only way his family knows he is doing well, evoking Kojima's sympathy and relationship with his hardworking parents. After that mishap, Kojima vows to resume his regular strict editorial role and keep a closer eye on the storyline to avoid another blown deadline.
2	May 1, 2026	978-4-08-884886-0
Chapters: 6–17
With Kojima fully enmeshed in the scheme to keep Hata out of the loop, Kurumizawa painstakingly modifies fan letters that say Hata is having the same effect on fans that Cyber Joe had on his childhood. After six months, Kurumizawa takes Hata to the movies at the young artist's request, where they run into fellow Victory mangaka Sagara and his assistant, Mariko Yoshikawa, who asks to assist on Balal, and Kurumizawa pretends to have a panic attack to prevent further discussion of "his" series. During the encounter, Kurumizawa drops a monogrammed handkerchief, which Yoshikawa returns to his home; Hata is suspicious of her motives. After she finds the contract, she attempts to warn Hata that Kurumizawa is lying to him and brings a legitimate copy of Shonen Victory to prove her point. Kurumizawa continues to confess the latest developments to his shadowy friend, noting that Yoshikawa has read the contract. Hata steals into Kurumizawa's study, where he finds further evidence on the lithographic machine. The story flashes back to Hata's childhood (1963–65); he was a poor student, often falling asleep in class until Tsukasa Hasegawa, his third grade teacher, takes an interest and uses Cyber Joe to make reading more palatable. Shortly after Hata entered the fourth grade, he dropped out because of an apathetic teacher, his mother's death, and his father's continued abuse; he continued to care for his grandmother until she passed away and his aunt turned him out of the house. After he learns the truth, Hata realizes that he holds Kurumizawa's fate in his hands; while filing some papers away, he comes across a letter written by a person named Yoshitaka Sawai which he is unable to read. He goes to Sagara's office to warn Yoshikawa to keep quiet, which she agrees to do, but she goes on to ask whether Cyber Joe also may have been ghostwritten under Kurumizawa's name. She returns with him to read the letter, which states that Cyber Joe was a collaboration with Sawai and Kurumizawa was always the pen name of two creators. Hata recalls that "Kurumizawa" warned him away from the back of the guest house; when they go to investigate, Yoshitaka trips over a human jawbone. Shocked, they are surprised by Kurumizawa, who takes both captive; a day later, Kojima also is detained after coming in person to ask why they will miss the deadline. Together, the three captives manage to outwit Kurumizawa and free themselves, but during their escape, he catches the trio again. Yoshikawa defends Hata, saying the character Balal needs a friend to stand up for him, just as Hata does, but Hata surprisingly overpowers and binds her, saying that she knows too much and if his mentor is arrested, that means the end of the series, and the best living conditions he has ever known. Hata devises a plan to ensure Yoshikawa's silence by blackmailing her.

== Reception ==
The first volume featured a recommendation from manga writer Kuwahali.

The series was ranked eighth in the web category at the twelfth Next Manga Awards in 2026.
