= Mad (manga) =

Japanese manga series

- First tankōbon volume cover
- Genre: Post-apocalyptic
- Manga
- Written by: Yusuke Otori
- Published by: Shueisha
- Imprint: Jump Comics+
- Magazine: Shonen Jump+
- Original run: June 18, 2024 – present
- Volumes: 8
- icon

Mad (stylized in all caps) is a Japanese manga series written and illustrated by Yusuke Otori. It began serialization on Shueisha's Shōnen Jump+ manga service in June 2024.

== Plot ==
Mysterious alien life-forms have invaded Earth, leading to the near-total annihilation of humanity. Among the few remaining survivors are John, his sister, and a scattered group of humans who cling to the hope of finding a new world to call home. However, their struggle for survival takes a dangerous turn when the aliens target them once more. After eating alien meat, John gains the ability to transform into an alien himself.

== Characters ==
=== The Survivors & John's group ===
John (ジョン, Jon)
John is a former farmer who alongside his sister Emma, have been searching for a place to call home after the invasion.
Emma (エマ, Ema)
Emma is John's deceased younger sister, whose words help guide John to continue on living long after her death.
Ethan (イーサン, Īsan)
Ethan is the leader of a group of survivors and a man who believes and hopes for a better future whilst constantly worrying for the safety of others.
Bob (ボブ, Bobu)
A former Jericho soldier who joined John after its downfall, he and John became friends not long after.
Lily (リリー, Rirī)
A former prisoner of Jericho obsessed with making clay dolls, she eventually joined John after Jericho had fallen.
Maya (マヤ, Maya)
A former prisoner of Jericho, she was one of the only few prisoners that had survived the downfall.

=== Jericho ===
Leon (レオン, Reon)
Leon is a commander of Jericho and one of their many Adaptors (適(てき)合(ごう)者(しゃ), Tekigō-sha), being able to turn into a humanoid alien at will.
Norman (ノーマン, Nōman)
Norman is the leader of Jericho, and a former colonel in the army before the invasion.
Robert (ロバート, Robāto)
Robert is one of the Adaptors in Jericho, and a member of the reconnaissance team, he is the foil to Liam, often found shouting at him whenever he messes up or complains.
Liam (リアム, Riamu)
Liam is one of the Adaptors in Jericho, and a member of the reconnaissance team, he is a cowardly man who does not have much control over his abilities.
Thomas (トーマス, Tōmasu)
Thomas is one of the Adaptors in Jericho, and a member of the reconnaissance team, he is much more rational than the rest of the reconnaissance team.
Oscar (オスカー, Osukā)
Oscar is one of the Adaptors in Jericho, and a member of the reconnaissance team, he is madly obsessed with Lily and claims to be in love with her.
Pigley (ピグリ, Piguri)
Pigley is a baby that had survived the downfall of Jericho, they were taken in by Leon not long after and have been in his care ever since.

=== Grius ===
Pano (パノ)
Pano is the leader of Grius and an Adaptor, she is considered to be incredibly strong with an innate understanding of alien powers.
Bajiro (バジロ)
Bajiro is Pano's father, and the co-founder of Grius, he loves his daughter more than anything else.
Masin (マーズン, Māzun)
Masin is one of the survivors within Grius, he is said to be rather gluttonous.
Saki (サキ)
Saki is a strong, stern member of Grius, she looks after a young boy named Tio as a form of older sister.

=== Church of Yazur ===
Yazur (ヤズール, Yazūru)
Yazur is a former slave, who after being saved by an alien as a child, became the leader of a mad cult under the belief that they are actually god.
Alda (アルダ, Aruda)
Alda is a master swordsman who was forced by Yazur himself to join the church.
Bongo (ボンゴ)
Bongo is Alda's pet lizard, he is often referred to incorrectly as a Komodo dragon, and is said to smell very bad.
Luo (ルオ, Ruo)
Luo is a young woman and one of the "Assimilators" in the church, she is madly obsessed with Alda.
Cobrott (コブロット, Koburotto)
Cobrott is an Assimilator in the church, he is a devout member and is capable of seeing incredibly far distances.
Torton (トルトン, Toruton)
Torton is an Assimilator, he is one of the older members of the church.
Serios (セリオス, Seriosu)
Serios is Yazur's right hand man, he is an Assimilator who is completely obsessed with Yazur.

== Publication ==
Written and illustrated by Yusuke Otori, Mad began serialization on Shueisha's Shōnen Jump+ manga service on June 18, 2024. The series' chapters have been collected into eight tankōbon volumes as of October 2026.

The series is published in English on Shueisha's Manga Plus app.

=== Volumes ===
No.	Japanese release date	Japanese ISBN
1	August 2, 2024	978-4-08-884163-2
1. "Invasion" (侵(しん)略(りゃく), Shinryaku); 2. "Jericho" (ジェリコ, Jeriko); 3. "The Stains on the Walls" (壁(かべ)のシミ, Kabe no Shimi)
2	November 1, 2024	978-4-08-884310-0
4. "Escape" (逃(とう)走(そう), Tōsō); 5. "Overwhelmed" (圧(あっ)倒(とう), Attō); 6. "The Fittest" (適(てき)合(ごう)者(しゃ), Tekigō-sha); 7. "Confinement" (幽(ゆう)閉(へい), Yūhei); 8. "Punishment" (お仕(し)置(お)き, Oshioki); 9. "Recon" (偵(てい)察(さつ), Teisatsu)
3	February 4, 2025	978-4-08-884346-9
10. "Horned" (角(つの)付(つ)き, Tsuno Tsuki); 11. "The Women" (女(おんな)達(たち), Onna-tachi); 12. "Good Luck Ritual" (幸(こう)運(うん)のおまじない, Kōun no Omajinai); 13. "End Him" (ブッ殺(とば)そう, Buttobasou); 14. "Awakening" (覚(かく)醒(せい), Kakusei)
4	June 4, 2025	978-4-08-884634-7
15. "Massacre" (鏖(おう)殺(さつ), Ōsatsu); 16. "Destruction" (崩(ほう)壊(かい), Hōkai); 17. "Quick Draw" (早(はや)撃(う)ち勝(しょう)負(ぶ), Hayauchi Shōbu); 18. "Bob's Decision" (ボブの決(けつ)断(だん), Bobu no Ketsudan); 19. "Hatred" (憎(ぞう)悪(お), Zōo); 20. "Beyond the Nest" (巣(すあ)穴(な)の向(む)こう側(がわ), Suana no Mukōgawa); 21. "Grius" (グライアス, Guraiasu)
5	September 4, 2025	978-4-08-884764-1
22. "Rolodov Forest" (ロロドーブの森(もり), Rorodōbu no Mori); 23. "Chapter 23" (半(はん)分(ぶん), Hanbun); 24. 999; 25. "The Smell of the Sea Breeze" (潮(しお)風(かぜ)の匂(にお)い, Shiokaze no Nioi); 26. "Corrupted Souls" (穢(けが)れ人(ひと), Kegare Hito); 27. "John vs Alda" (ジョンVSアルダ, Jon Bāsasu Aruda); 28. "Pano" (パノ); 29. "It's Over" (おしまい, Oshimai)
6	January 5, 2026	978-4-08-884777-1
7	May 1, 2026	978-4-08-885031-3
8	October 2, 2026	978-4-08-885261-4

=== Chapters not yet in tankōbon format ===
These chapters have yet to be published in a tankōbon volume.

30. "New Frontiers" (新(しん)天(てん)地(ち), Shintenchi)
31. "Training" (特(とっ)訓(くん), Tokkun)
32. "Yazur" (ヤズール, Yazūru)
33. "Assault" (襲来, Shūrai)
34. "From the Darkness" (暗闇の中から, Kurayami no naka kara)
35. "Powerlessness" (無力さ, Muryoku-sa)
36. "Raison d'Être" (存在の意義, Sonzai no igi)
37. "Blood and Pus" (血と膿(うみ), Chi to nō)

== Reception ==
The series was nominated for the 11th Next Manga Awards in the print category in 2025, and was ranked eleventh.
