= Maison and the Man-Eating Apartment =

Japanese manga series

- First tankōbon volume cover

人喰いマンションと大家のメゾン (Hito Kui Manshon to Ōya no Mezon)
- Genre: Dystopian
- Manga
- Written by: Kuu Tanaka
- Illustrated by: Akima
- Published by: Shueisha
- Imprint: Jump Comics+
- Magazine: Shōnen Jump+
- Original run: March 7, 2025 – present
- Volumes: 5

Maison and the Man-Eating Apartment (Japanese: 人喰いマンションと大家のメゾン, Hepburn: Hito Kui Manshon to Ōya no Mezon) is a Japanese manga series written by Kuu Tanaka and illustrated by Akima. It began serialization on Shueisha's Shōnen Jump+ manga service in March 2025. As of October 2026, five volumes have been released.

== Plot ==
Time flows continuously inside an apartment building, even though Earth is one second away from collapse, and people live there. One resident, a young girl named Maison, is appointed as the landlady from the moment she is born. When she turns 14, she is separated from her best friend and sets out to unravel the secrets of the apartment building.

== Publication ==
Written by Kuu Tanaka and illustrated by Akima, the series began serialization on Shueisha's manga website Shōnen Jump+ on March 7, 2025. It is set to end serialization on December 4, 2026. As of October 2026, the series' individual chapters have been collected into five tankōbon volumes.

The series' chapters are simultaneously published in English on Shueisha's Manga Plus platform.

=== Volumes ===
No.	Japanese release date	Japanese ISBN
1	July 4, 2025	978-4-08-884675-0
2	October 3, 2025	978-4-08-884770-2
3	February 4, 2026	978-4-08-885017-7
4	June 4, 2026	978-4-08-885160-0
5	October 2, 2026	978-4-08-885258-4

== Reception ==
The manga was nominated for the 2025 Next Manga Award in the web category. It was nominated for the 19th Manga Taishō in 2026, and was ranked eleventh.
