= War of the Adults =

Japanese manga series

- First tankōbon volume cover

大人大戦 (Otona Taisen)
- Genre: Drama; Survival
- Manga
- Written by: Kappy
- Illustrated by: Masaaki Tsuzuki
- Published by: Shueisha
- Imprint: Jump Comics+
- Magazine: Shōnen Jump+
- Original run: April 5, 2025 – present
- Volumes: 6

War of the Adults (Japanese: 大人大戦, Hepburn: Otona Taisen) is a Japanese manga series written by Kappy and illustrated by Masaaki Tsuzuki. It began serialization on Shueisha's Shōnen Jump+ manga service in April 2025.

== Premise ==
Yutaro Urashima is a young man who heeds the words of his deceased father in order to become an "upright adult," as a result, he adheres to his self-imposed "adult constitution" for self-discipline. One day, while saving a cat from being hit by a truck, he is involved in a traffic accident and falls into a coma. Fifteen years later, Yutaro miraculously awakens, only to find that Japanese society has undergone profound changes because of the "adult constitution" he created years ago...

== Publication ==
Written by Kappy and illustrated by Masaaki Tsuzuki, War of the Adults began serialization on Shueisha's Shōnen Jump+ manga service on April 5, 2025. Its chapters have been compiled into six tankōbon volumes as of October 2026.

The series' chapters are simultaneously published in English on Shueisha's Manga Plus app.

No.	Release date	ISBN
1	June 4, 2025	978-4-08-884598-2
2	September 4, 2025	978-4-08-884624-8
3	January 5, 2026	978-4-08-884754-2
4	April 3, 2026	978-4-08-885008-5
5	July 3, 2026	978-4-08-885124-2
6	October 2, 2026	978-4-08-885221-8
7	December 4, 2026	978-4-08-885335-2

== Reception ==
The series was nominated for the 11th Next Manga Awards in the web category in 2025, and was ranked nineteenth; it was also ranked fourth at the twelfth edition in 2026.
