= Ghost Reaper Girl =

Japanese manga series by Akissa Saiké

- Cover of the first tankōbon volume of Ghost Reaper Girl, featuring Kai Iod (top; seen in both his human and scythe forms) and Chloé Love (middle)

GHOST GIRL ゴーストガール
- Genre: Action; Fantasy; Supernatural
- Manga
- Written by: Akissa Saiké
- Published by: Shueisha
- English publisher: NA: Viz Media
- Imprint: Jump Comics+
- Magazine: Shōnen Jump+
- Original run: July 13, 2020 – present
- Volumes: 4

Ghost Reaper Girl (Note: Japanese: GHOST GIRL ゴーストガール) is a Japanese manga series written and illustrated by Akissa Saiké. It has been serialized in Shueisha's Shōnen Jump+ service since July 2020, with its chapters collected into four tankōbon volumes as of March 2022.

== Plot ==
After a recent incident where evil spirits escaped from the realm of Hades, an unsuccessful actress named Chloé Love is targeted by evil spirits that attempt to possess her. There, she is rescued by Kai Iod, a more humanlike spirit who is a fan of hers and works for the Arkham Bullet bureau of Hades as a Ghost Reaper, exterminating evil spirits. By allowing Kai to possess her, Chloé can transform into the Ghost Reaper Girl, wielding Kai in the form of a scythe to defeat evil spirits.

== Publication ==
Ghost Reaper Girl is written and illustrated by Akissa Saiké. The manga began its serialization in Shueisha's online magazine Shōnen Jump+ service on July 13, 2020. The series went on an indefinite hiatus on May 31, 2022, due to Saike's poor health. It resumed publication on October 31, 2023, until March 25, 2024, where the manga take indefinite hiatus again due to Saike's poor health. Shueisha has collected its chapters into individual tankōbon volumes. The first volume was released on December 4, 2020.

The manga is the author's third series. And it is his first new manga series since he changed his manga artist name from Akihisa Ikeda to Akissa Saiké. It has been serialized biweekly, about 6 years after, following the ending of his previous manga series Rosario + Vampire on April 19, 2014. For the names of the characters, etc. are based on names from the Cthulhu Mythos.

The series has been licensed for simultaneous publication in North America as it is released in Japan, with its chapters being digitally launched by Viz Media on its Shonen Jump website. Viz Media is publishing the manga in left-to-right format at Saiké's request. Shueisha also simulpublishes the series in English for free on the Manga Plus app and website. Viz Media has begun releasing physical volumes with the first volume on June 7, 2022.

=== Volume list ===
| No. | Original release date | Original ISBN | English release date | English ISBN |
|---|---|---|---|---|
| 1 | December 4, 2020 | 978-4-08-882507-6 | June 7, 2022 | 978-1-9747-2976-0 |
1. "May I Come In?"; 2. "Soul Predator Noel" (魂喰いのノエル, Tamashī kui no Noeru); 3. "Arkham Bullet" (アーカムバレット, Ākamu Baretto); 4. "Crawling Chaos" (這い寄る混沌, Haiyoru Konton)
| 2 | March 4, 2021 | 978-4-08-882625-7 | September 6, 2022 | 978-1-9747-3407-8 |
5. "Catfight"; 6. "Code Name" (コードネーム, Kōdo Nēmu); 7. "Level Up"; 8. "Game of the Dead" (死体遊戯, Shitai Yūgi); 9. "The Killing Doll" (殺戮人形, Satsuriku Ningyō); 10. "Like Magic" (魔法みたいに, Mahō Mitai ni); 11. "Changes"; 12. "Despite the Scary Parts" (怖いこともあるけど, Kowai Koto mo Arukedo); 13. "Run Chloé Run" (ラン・クロエ・ラン, Ran Kuroe Ran)
| 3 | September 3, 2021 | 978-4-08-882783-4 | December 6, 2022 | 978-1-9747-3408-5 |
14. "Ranking" (ランキング, Rankingu); 15. "Nest" (ネスト, Nesuto); 16. "Battlefield"; 17. "Call of 'C'"; 18. "Re-Animator"; 19. "Sea God" (海神, Kaijin); 20. "Power Game" (パワーゲーム, Pawā Gēmu); 21. "The Price" (代償, Daishō); 22. "I'm Sorry" (ごめんね, Gomen ne); 23. "The Day to Become a Hero" (英雄になる日, Eiyū ni Naru Hi)
| 4 | March 4, 2022 | 978-4-08-882889-3 | March 7, 2023 | 978-1-9747-3473-3 |
24. "Red Carpet" (レッドカーペット, Reddo Kāpetto); 25. "Secret" (シークレット, Shīkuretto); 26. "Cat's Philosophy" (猫の哲学, Neko no Tetsugaku); 27. "Absolute Justice" (絶対正義, Zettai Seigi); 28. "True Master" (本当のあるじ, Hontō no Aruji); 29. "—" (災厄のめざめ, Saiyaku no Mezame) (Note: Chapter 29 at the time of web posting is as follows. "Feeling Good" (爽快な気分, Sōkai na Kibun)); 30. "Silver Key" (銀の鍵, Gin no Kagi); 31. "Like Bonnie and Clyde" (ボニーとクライドみたいに, Bonī to Kuraido Mitai ni); 32. "Declaration of War" (宣戦布告, Sensen Fukoku)

=== Chapters not yet in tankōbon format ===
These chapters have yet to be published in a tankōbon volume.

33. "Night-gaunt" (ナイトゴーント, Naito Gōnto)
34. "Opener of the Gate" (扉を開く者, Tobira o Hiraku Mono)
35. "Advisor" (参謀, Sanbō)
36. "Dreamlands" (夢幻郷, Mugenkyō)
37. "Negotiation with an Evil God" (邪神との交渉, Jashin to no Kōshō)

== Reception ==
Reviewing Ghost Reaper Girl, Steven Blackburn of Screen Rant compared the manga to other Japanese series that he says involve "some type of creature entering the hero's body and granting the host powers", such as Parasyte, Kaiju No. 8, Dragon Ball GT and Jujutsu Kaisen; Blackburn claimed that Ghost Reaper Girl is a refreshing take of this trope, commenting that "there isn't really anything like Ghost Reaper Girl".
