= Girl Meets Rock! =

Japanese manga series

- First tankōbon volume cover, featuring Chihiro Hatono

ふつうの軽音部 (Futsū no Keionbu)
- Genre: Coming-of-age; Musical; Slice of life
- Manga

Jump Rookie! version
- Written by: Kuwahali
- Published by: Shueisha
- Magazine: Jump Rookie!
- Original run: January 7, 2023 – September 18, 2023
- Manga

Shōnen Jump+ remake
- Written by: Kuwahali
- Illustrated by: Tetsuo Ideuchi
- Published by: Shueisha
- English publisher: NA: Seven Seas Entertainment
- Imprint: Jump Comics+
- Magazine: Shōnen Jump+
- Original run: January 14, 2024 – present
- Volumes: 12
- icon

Girl Meets Rock! (Japanese: ふつうの軽音部, Hepburn: Futsū no Keionbu; lit. 'Ordinary Light Music Club' (Note: In Japan, "light music" (軽音楽, keiongaku) refers to all forms of popular music other than classical music.)) is a Japanese web manga series created by Kuwahali. It tells the story of first year high school student Chihiro Hatono, who begins playing guitar and joins her school's light music club. Kuwahali published the original work on Shueisha's digital platform Jump Rookie! from January to September 2023. A remake, written by Kuwahali and illustrated by Tetsuo Ideuchi, has been serialized on Shōnen Jump+ since January 2024. Its chapters have been collected in 12 tankōbon volumes as of October 2026. The remake is published digitally in English on Manga Plus. Seven Seas Entertainment began publishing the series in North America in August 2026.

Girl Meets Rock! has been well-received, winning the 10th Next Manga Award in the web category and being nominated for the 18th Manga Taishō and the 9th Saito Takao Award.

== Synopsis ==
New high school student Chihiro Hatono buys her first electric guitar and joins the light music club at Tanikyu High School. There, she and bassist Rin Koyama form the band La Cittadella (ラチッタデッラ, Ra Chittaderra). Not very good, they quickly break up, as do other club bands. After having heard Hatono sing, Rin sets out scheming to form the perfect band with Hatono on vocals. They quickly recruit drummer Momo Uchida, whose own band broke up after their bassist was dumped by fellow club member Koki Takami, a skilled guitarist and singer who is popular with girls. In order to play a concert in July, Hatono's band temporary recruits third year Tamaki Nitta as a support guitarist. Hatono's lackluster performance there spurs her to practice playing and singing in Nagai Park every day of summer vacation. When the second semester begins, Hatono's band recruits guitarist Ayame Fuji, who was about to quit the club after also being dumped by Takami. They also decide to name their group Heartbreak (はあとぶれいく), which Hatono suggested after a Zazen Boys song. Despite the performing acts for the September cultural festival already being decided, Rin's scheming earns Heartbreak a slot. There, Hatono impresses the club members with her improvements, including Takami, who begins to view her and Heartbreak as rivals to his band Protocol. Takami makes a bet with Hatono where the members of whichever band puts on a better show at the Halloween concert, as judged by three of their senpai, get to ask the losing band's members any question they want.

== Characters ==
=== Heartbreak ===
Chihiro Hatono (鳩野 ちひろ, Hatono Chihiro)
A 15-year-old first year high school student who is a self-described introvert. After her parents divorced, she moved from Kawasaki to Osaka Prefecture for her first year of middle school. Despite being a complete beginner on guitar, she borrows money from her mother to buy a red Fender Telecaster. She has dreamed of being the guitarist and vocalist in a rock band since she was a child, but has suppressed the latter ever since her voice was made fun of in middle school. As the story progresses, she develops a crush on Mizuo. She is impressed by his guitar skills, and they interact regularly in everyday life.
Rin Koyama (幸山 厘, Kōyama Rin)
A tall first year student with short hair. She is a bassist who asks Hatono, whom she calls "Hato-chan" (はとちゃん), to form a band, La Cittadella (and later Heartbreak after their initial disbandment). After secretly watching her sing, Rin becomes obsessed with Hatono's vocals, to the point of worshiping her as her "god". She pulls numerous schemes in order to form a new band with the perfect members and Hatono as frontwoman. Although she often looks like the guru of the informal "Hatano cult", Rin shows genuine affection and concern for her and the other members of the group in critical moments. She uses a sunburst Fender Jazz Bass.
Momo Uchida (内田 桃, Uchida Momo)
An outgoing first year student with two braids in her hair. She is a drummer who befriends Hatono, whom she calls "Hattocchi" (はとっち), on their first day of high school. She initially forms a trio named Sound Sleep, but they disband in June when a member quits the club after being dumped by Koki Takami. After hearing Hatono sing at a karaoke session arranged by Rin, Momo joins their band. The other three members elect her to be bandleader.
Ayame Fuji (藤井 彩目, Fuji Ayame)
A guitarist with a wolf cut who is always seen wearing a pink hoodie jacket. She is a former elementary school classmate of Momo. Ayame was the guitarist in the band Protocol until leaving it after being dumped in August by its vocalist Koki Takami. Although she was planning to quit the music club, she agrees to join Hatono's band after seeing her perform solo following her summer training. Her former surname was "Morita". She uses an orange Fender Jazzmaster.

=== Protocol ===
Koki Takami (鷹見 項希, Takami Koki)
A skilled guitarist and singer who is popular with girls. He is the vocalist and a guitarist of the band Protocol. Days after breaking up with the bassist of Sound Sleep, Takami begins dating his bandmate Ayame. He breaks up with her a couple months later. He has an older brother who was in a band, but he does not know his current whereabouts. Initially, Takami displays an attitude of rivalry towards the main characters. He uses a blue Fender Telecaster.
Haruichi Mizuo (水尾 春一, Mizuo Haruichi)
The laid-back and unemotional guitarist who replaces Ayame in Protocol. He attended the same middle school as Hatono, and is her co-worker at a Chinese restaurant. Although he begins to notice that Hatono is acting strangely at some point, he still does not realize that she has begun to have feelings for him. He uses a yellow Gibson Les Paul Special.
Ryuya Taguchi (田口 流哉, Taguchi Ryūya)
The bassist of Protocol and Rin's cousin. He is aware of Rin's scheming and manipulations, and went to middle school with Takami. Taguchi is also the support bassist of Friday Nights. He uses a white Fender Jazz Bass
Gen Tono (遠野 元, Tōno Gen)
The bespectacled drummer of Protocol who has a crush on Momo. He is very knowledgeable about the drums, which he has been playing since elementary school, and has disdain for those who do not take their instruments seriously. He is the bandleader of Protocol.

=== Other characters ===
Yoichi Tabata (田端 陽一, Tabata Yōichi)
A member of the light music club who is nicknamed "Yonsu" (ヨンス). He is the singer and a guitarist of Hatono's first band, La Cittadella, until quitting the club after being romantically rejected by Rin. However, after he continued to message her, Rin realized she can use Yonsu in her schemes. He rejoins the music club to sing in Yoshida Mart (吉田商店, Yoshida Shōten) after their vocalist quits, and renames the band to Friday Nights (フライデーナイツ, Furaidē Naitsu).
Reiha Tatsumi (巽 玲羽, Tatsumi Reiha)
A member of Shichido High School's light music club that works as a model. She went to middle school with Hatono and Mizuo, where she was briefly the latter's girlfriend. She is nice to Hatono on the surface, but Reiha looks down on her and Hatono can sense it. Hatono envies how bold and unrestrained Reiha is as a performer.

== Production ==
=== Origins ===
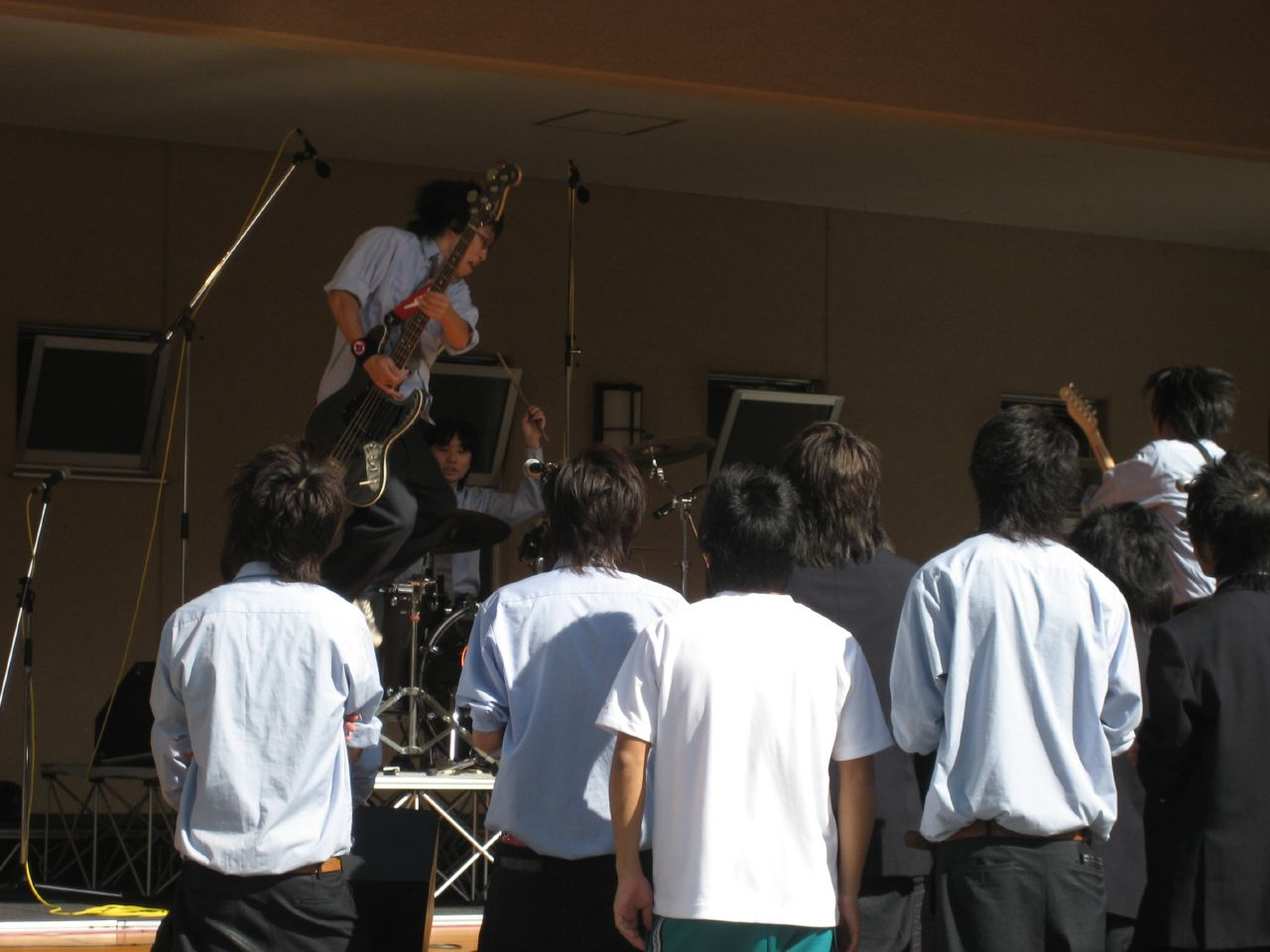
Students performing at a Japanese high school festival

Wanting to try something new during the COVID-19 pandemic, Kuwahali bought an iPad and started practicing drawing before eventually deciding to try his hand at manga, which he has liked since childhood. Insecure in his skills, his first work was an essay manga about his high school life that he published in serialized form on Twitter. He then conceived Girl Meets Rock! as he wanted to create fiction with more ups and downs in the story. Kuwahali's time working as a teacher at a high school in Osaka for over a decade influenced the series; "The students I taught as a teacher were actually striving to win the top prize at the school festival. I want to portray the joy of being passionate about something. I feel like nowadays the spotlight tends to focus on big goals like 'becoming number one in Japan' or 'making a lot of money', so I think this work serves as a counter to that trend." The light music club setting was chosen because he was the advisor to the one at the school and felt that focusing on a large number of the club members would differentiate it from other works featuring the same setting. He set the story in Osaka because he is familiar with it and also thought readers would enjoy it.

When asked about the manga's title, the author said he did not give it much thought but that it came from his time as advisor, "It was just the norm for the club to be full of all sorts of people, and for none of them to be particularly talented. I wanted to depict the story of just such an ordinary light music club." Kuwahali also has a background in music personally, as he formed his first band, which played original songs, during his freshman year of college where he was the bassist. Although he continued to play in cover bands casually for nearly 20 years, and also plays drums as a hobby, he insists he is not very good.

After publishing the first three chapters on Twitter, Kuwahali began uploading to Jump Rookie!—a part of Shueisha's digital platform Shōnen Jump+—with 22 chapters published from January 7 to September 18, 2023. Believing there was no way he would become a professional manga artist due to his lack of drawing skills, he said it was the response from his gradually increasing readers that motivated him to continue, rather than any personal desire to create.

Kuwahali said that at first, Girl Meets Rock! was like an essay manga when he started it. But this changed when Hatono became depressed over making mistakes at her first live and picked herself up and started to practice; "I started to feel that Hatono was like the protagonist of a shōnen manga. With that development, I felt like the character's attributes became clear again. The excitement of the work rose, and it felt like it was not as relaxed as it was at the beginning, and it had a rather hot-blooded, sports-spirited element to it." It was around this point that Kuwahali was approached by an editor at Shōnen Jump+ to have a meeting about turning Girl Meets Rock! into a proper serialized manga. He was hesitant because of his lack of skills and because he already had a full-time job, but agreed once it was decided that he would focus on writing the story and Tetsuo Ideuchi would be in charge of illustrating it. The editor chose Ideuchi because his previous work, Yakyū-ba de Itadakimasu, also featured cute girls and everyday scenes. Additionally, while Ideuchi had no experience in bands, the editor knew he had traveled to various places to do research for his manga, so he thought the artist would be good at absorbing new things and incorporating them into the series.

=== Process and characters ===
When serialization was decided, Kuwahali used the chapters published on Rookie! as a base and reworked their pacing. With an increase in page count from 8 to 19, he said he enjoyed going back and rearranging the storyboards to show parts he previously had to skip. Kuwahali does not plan the story in advance. Although there are times when he thinks of developments he wants to do in the future, he does not decide on how to get there and just focuses on the immediate developments as he draws the storyboards. For example, he never thought about having Yonsu return to the club. Knowing that chapter 30 would be the end of the third tankōbon volume, he felt ending on Hatono's discussion with her dad would be weak, thus he brought in an unexpected character with Yonsu. Kuwahali said the only thing in his writing that had changed since the shift to Shōnen Jump+ was that he now thinks more about adding a hook to the end of each chapter.

Although he is often told that his characters are realistic, Kuwahali said he is not conscious of that at all when writing, but suggested it might be due to the influence of the essay manga by his two favorite manga artists; Saho Yamamoto and Shigeyuki Fukumitsu. There are no clear models for his characters, and although he thinks they are mixed with the essences of people he has met and characters from other works, the author largely believes he is projecting his own thoughts, personality, and experiences. For example, he embarrassingly admitted that Yonsu's "slightly creepy" way of asking someone out is something he actually did in the past. The main character of Hatono is largely a projection of Kuwahali himself, and the other characters were created based on their connection to her. Each one was conceived based on a rough first impression, such as "cheerful" or "cool", and the author then wrote chapters that gave them more dimension. For example, Momo is introduced as a cheerful and energetic girl, but is later shown to have trauma and a complex surrounding love. Another example is Rin, who began as the "cool" character, but as Kuwahali wrote, he came to want a "powerful" character who can move the story forward and selected her for the role. Kuwahali suggested the Osakan way of speaking frankly may have influenced the characters.

The manga features many real-life songs by Japanese rock acts, which Kuwahali chooses from those that he listens to personally. He noted that although Hatono was initially portrayed as a rather stubborn fan of Japanese rock who made fun of major label bands, he decided this was not a good message to readers. So he consciously selected major bands that Hatono would listen to. When deciding which song a character will sing, he considers their personality. When a song appears in the story, he listens to it while drawing the storyboards in order to try and make the flow of the panels match the rhythm of the music. Because the lyrics to the songs are often linked to the story or the characters' emotions, Kuwahali said he and Ideuchi try to ensure that those connections come across well. Kuwahali said the reason there have not been any original songs in the manga yet, is simply because he wants to introduce some of his favorites, but said original songs may appear as it goes on. He also said Western music might appear in the future.

== Publication ==
Written by Kuwahali and illustrated by Tetsuo Ideuchi, Girl Meets Rock! started on Shueisha's digital platform Shōnen Jump+ on January 14, 2024. Shueisha has collected its chapters into individual tankōbon volumes, with the first one released on April 4, 2024. As of October 2, 2026, twelve volumes have been released. A special one-shot of the series was published in Weekly Shōnen Jump on September 1, 2025.

The series is published digitally in English on Manga Plus. On June 29, 2024, it was announced that it would be "temporarily suspended" from the platform; it returned on November 23 of the same year. In August 2025, at Anime NYC, Seven Seas Entertainment announced it had licensed the series for print and digital publication in North America, with the first volume released in August 2026. Both Manga Plus and Seven Seas remove the lyrics to any real-life songs featured in the manga.

=== Volumes ===
No.	Original release date	Original ISBN	English release date	English ISBN
1	April 4, 2024	978-4-08-884019-2	August 4, 2026	979-8-89765-756-8
1. "Let's Buy a Guitar" (ギターを買う, Gitā o Kau); 2. "Let's Check Out the Welcome Concert" (新歓ライブを観る, Shinkan Raibu o Miru); 3. "Let's Join the Light Music Club" (軽音部に入部する, Keionbu ni Nyūbu Suru); 4. "Let's Practice Guitar" (ギターを練習する, Gitā o Renshū Suru); 5. "Let's Form a Band" (バンドを結成する, Bando o Kessei Suru); 6. "Let's Get Closer to Senpai" (先輩と仲良くなる, Senpai o Nakayoku Naru); 7. "Let's Fail an Audition" (オーディションに落ちる, Ōdishon ni Ochiru); 8. "Let's Play a Guitar I Can't Play" (弾けないギターを弾く, Hikenai Gitā o Hiku); 9. "Let's Let the Friction Build" (軋轢が生まれる, Atsureki ga Umareru); 10. "Let's Get to Know Our Friends" (友だちのことを知る, Tomodachi no Koto o Shiru); 11. "Let's Survive the Sports Festival" (体育祭を乗り切る, Taiikusai o Norikiru); 12. "Let's Disband" (バンドが解散する, Bando ga Kaisan Suru); Bonus. "Making Friends" (友達を作る, Tomodachi o Tsukuru)
2	June 4, 2024	978-4-08-884082-6	November 3, 2026	979-8-89765-757-5
13. "Let's Go Our Separate Ways" (別の道を行く, Betsu no Michi o Iku); 14. "Let's Form a Makeshift Band" (即席バンドを組む, Sokuseki Bando o Kumu); 15. "Let's Make Our Debut Performance" (初ライブをする, Hatsu Raibu o Suru); 16. "Let's Become a Vocalist" (ボーカルになる, Bōkaru ni Naru); 17. "Let's Train to Sing and Play" (弾き語り修行をする, Hikigatari Shugyō o Suru); 18. "Let's Set Up a Landmine" (地雷を仕掛ける, Jirai o Shikakeru); 19. "Let's See the Wider World" (大海を知る, Taikai o Shiru); 20. "Let's Do Some Projecting" (面影を重ねる, Omokage o Kasaneru); 21. "Let's Talk About Our Breakup" (別れ話をする, Wakarebanashi o Suru)
3	September 4, 2024	978-4-08-884238-7	February 2, 2027	979-8-89765-758-2
22. "Let's Start the Second Semester" (2学期が始まる, Nigakki ga Hajimaru); 23. "Let's Get Into an Argument" (口喧嘩をする, Kuchigenka o Suru); 24. "Let's Move Forward" (その先に向かう, Sono Saki ni Mukau); 25. "Let's Form a Band" (バンドを結成する, Bando o Kessei Suru); 26. "Let's Name Our Band" (バンド名を決める, Bando-mei o Kimeru); 27. "Let's Cook Up a Plan" (陰謀を巡らす, Inbō o Megurasu); 28. "Let's Make a New Friend" (仲間と出会う, Nakama to Deau); 29. "Let's Have Our First Practice Session" (初合わせをする, Hatsu Awase o Suru); 30. "Let's Reunite with Dad" (父と再会する, Chichi to Saikai Suru)
4	November 1, 2024	978-4-08-884260-8	May 11, 2027	979-8-89765-759-9
31. "Let's Welcome Back Yonsu" (ヨンスが帰ってくる, Yonsu ga Kaettekuru); 32. "Let's Get Ready for the Cultural Festival" (文化祭の準備をする, Bunkasai no Junbi o Suru); 33. "Let's Secure a Performance Slot" (出場枠を確保する, Shutsujōwaku o Kakuho Suru); 34. "Let's Enter the Studio" (スタジオに入る, Sutajio ni Hairu); 35. "Let's Begin the Cultural Festival" (文化祭が始まる, Bunkasai ga Hajimaru); 36. "Let's Take the Stage" (ステージに立つ, Sutēji ni Tatsu); 37. "Let's Acknowledge the Band" (そのバンドを知る, Sono Bando o Shiru); 38. "Let's Meet That Girl" (女が来る, Onna ga Kiru); 39. "Let's Watch Reiha Run Wild" (レイハ荒ぶる, Reiha Araburu)
5	January 4, 2025	978-4-08-884334-6	—	—
40. "Let's Catch a Glimpse" (片鱗を示す, Henrin o Shimesu); 41. "Let's Remember the Good Old Days" (輝く日々を想う, Kagayaku Hibi o Omou); 42. "Let's Put a Damper on Things" (輝く日々が曇る, Kagayaku Hibi ga Kumoru); 43. "Let's Chase After Those Shining Days" (輝く日々を走る, Kagayaku Hibi ga Hashiru); 44. "Let's Shout Out Those Shining Days" (輝く日々を叫ぶ, Kagayaku Hibi o Sakebu); 45. "Let's Dream of That Stage" (その舞台を夢見る, Sono Butai o Yumemiru); 46. "Let's Establish a New Regime" (新体制が発足する, Shintaisei ga Hossoku Suru); 47. "Let's Shake Up This Meeting" (会議は踊る, Kaigi wa Odoru); 48. "Let's Pose a Problem" (問いを抱える, Toi o Kakaeru)
6	April 4, 2025	978-4-08-884481-7	—	—
49. "Let's Learn About Ourselves" (自分のことを知る, Jibun no Koto o Shiru); 50. "Let's Walk on Air" (空をいく, Sora o Iku); 51. "Let's Attend Part Practice" (パート練習をする, Pāto Renshū o Suru); 52. "Let's Take Things Step-by-Step" (一歩ずつ進む, Ippozutsu Susumu); 53. "Let's Support Each Other" (力になる, Chikara ni Naru); 54. "Let's Preserve the Ecosystem" (生態系を守護る, Seitaikei o Mamoru); 55. "Let's Exchange Words" (言葉を交わす, Kotoba o Kawasu); 56. "Let's Amplify Our Ambitions" (憧憬を強める, Dōkei o Tsuyomeru); 57. "Let's Begin the Halloween Concert" (ハロウィンライブが始まる, Harowin Raibu ga Hajimaru)
7	June 4, 2025	978-4-08-884541-8	—	—
58. "Let's Yonsu It Up" (ヨンス昂ぶる, Yonsu Takaburu); 59. "Let's Feel Heartbreak Again" (はーとぶれいく今日もゆく, Hātobureiku Kyō mo Yuku); 60. "Let's Take the Initiative" (機先を制する, Kisen o Sei Suru); 61. "Let's Keep Playing" (このまま弾く, Kono Mama Hiku); 62. "Let's Get Up and Go On" (起き上がりまた進む, Okiagari Mata Susumu); 63. "Let's Spark That Future" (その未来を閃く, Sono Mirai o Hirameku); 64. "Let's See Protocol" (プロトコル始まる, Purotokoro Hajimaru); 65. "Let's Grow" (芽生える, Mebaeru); 66. "Let's Remember Bygone Days" (在りし日々を想う, Arishi Hibi o Omou)
8	September 4, 2025	978-4-08-884689-7	—	—
67. "Let's Waver in Bygone Days" (在りし日々に揺れる, Arishi Hibi ni Yureru); 68. "Let's Wither Away in Bygone Days" (在りし日々が枯れる, Arishi Hibi ga Kareru); 69. "Let's Speak to You" (君に語りかける, Kimi ni Kitarikakeru); 70. "Let's Set Our Sights" (照準を定める, Shūjun o Sadameru); 71. "Let's Decide the Victors" (勝敗を分かつ, Shōhai o Wakatsu); 72. "Let's Wait for That Moment" (その時を待つ, Sono Toki o Matsu); 73. "Let's Close Out the Show" (終演に向かう, Shūen ni Mukau); 74. "Let's Fight Evil with Evil" (悪が悪を叩く, Aku ga Aku o Tataku); 75. "Let's Drown in Temptation" (誘惑に溺れる, Yūwaku ni Oboreru)
9	December 4, 2025	978-4-08-884779-5	—	—
76. "Let's Face That Feeling" (その感情を知る, Sono Kanjō o Shiru); 77. "Let's Know Our Place" (わきまえる, Wakimaeru); 78. "Let's Answer Some Questions" (質問に答える, Shitsumon ni Kotaeru); 79. "Let's Hang Out Just the Four of Us" (4人で遊ぶ); 80. "Let's Become Punk Rockers" (パンクロッカーを目指す); 81. "Let's Have a Chance Encounter" (邂逅する); 82. "Let's Flail Around" (ダバダバする); 83. "Let's Talk About Love" (恋バナをする); 84. "Let's Make a Band Tee" (バンドTシャツを作る)
10	March 4, 2026	978-4-08-884893-8	—	—
85. "Let's Start the Joint Concert" (合同ライブが始まる); 86. "Let's Watch a Storm Brew" (嵐が迫る); 87. "Let's Remember the Early Days of Spring" (春浅き日々を想う); 88. "Let's Leave Behind the Early Days of Spring" (春浅き日々を降りる); 89. "Let's Weep in the Early Days of Spring" (春浅き日々に泣く); 90. "Let's Sing a Lie" (嘘を歌う); 91. "Let's Feel Ayame's Fury" (彩目怒る); 92. "Let's Sing Awfully" (ヘタクソが歌う); 93. "Let's Picture that Future" (その未来を写す)
11	July 3, 2026	978-4-08-885108-2	—	—
94. "Let's Meet Up" (会いにいく); 95. "Let's Light the Fire" (鼓舞する); 96. "Let's Shout a Huge Lie" (大嘘を叫ぶ); 97. "Let's Stop Holding Back" (わきまえなくなる); 98. "Let's Enjoy the Main Attraction" (真打登場する); 99. "Let's Watch Mawari Nikaido Run Wild" (二楷堂まわり暴れる); 100. "Let's Set Our Sights" (照準を定める); 101. "Let's End the Joint Concert" (合同ライブが終わる); 102. "Let's Put On a Christmas Concert" (クリスマスライブをする)
12	October 2, 2026	978-4-08-885266-9	—	—
103. "Let's Celebrate New Year's" (年末年始を過ごす); 104. "Let's Start the Third Semester" (3学期が始まる); 105. "Let's Watch Evil Rear Its Head" (悪が蠢く); 106. "Let's Dig into Rin's Past" (厘の過去を探る); 107. "Let's Perform at an Off-campus Event" (外部イベントに出る); 108. "Let's Drift Away" (遠ざかる); 109. "Let's Go Wild" (暴れる); 110. "Let's Stay Connected" (繋がりは続く); 111. "Let's Bury Our Senpai" (先輩を葬る)

=== Chapters not yet in tankōbon format ===
These chapters have yet to be published in a tankōbon volume.

- 112. "Let's Remember the Withered Days" (乾いた日々を想う)
- 113. "Let's Witness the Fall of Asaka Tsuru" (鶴亜沙加朽ちて散る)
- 114. "Let's Ponder a Musician's Dilemma" (バンドマン悩む)
- 115. "Let's Confide in a Friend" (友に告げる)
- 116. "Let's Get Ready for Graduation" (卒業を前にする)
- 117. "Let's Hear Yonsu's Song" (ヨンス唱う)
- 118. "Let's Tell Our Senpai Everything" (先輩に告げる)
- 119. "Let's Remember You" (君を思い出す)
- 120. "Let's Discover Our True Desire" (願いに辿り着く)
- 121. "Let's Make Our Youth Last" (青春は続く)
- 122. "Let's Do It for Fun" (遊びでやる)
- 123. "Let's Enjoy the Moment" (今を楽しむ)
- 124. "Let's Graduate" (卒業する)
- 125. "Let's Start Our Second Year" (2年生になる)
- 126. "Let's Meet Our New Advisor" (新顧問誕生する)
- 127. "Let's Put On a Welcome Concert" (新歓ライブをする)
- 128. "Let's Gaze at the Stars" (星を見る)

== Other media ==
Futsū no Keionbu to Hajimeru! Yasashī Electric Guitar Renshū Book (『ふつうの軽音部』と始める！ やさしいエレキ・ギター練習ブック), a reference book for beginner's learning to play guitar that utilizes songs featured in the manga, was released on April 19, 2025.

== Reception ==
Girl Meets Rock! had over 36 million views on Shōnen Jump+ by November 2024, and over 130 million by the end of March 2026. Its sixth collected volume was the best-selling manga at Comic Zin stores for the week of March 31 – April 6, 2025. The series won the 10th Next Manga Award in the web category in 2024. It also ranked tenth at the third Late Night Manga Awards in 2024 hosted by Bungeishunjū's Crea magazine. The series ranked second on both Takarajimasha's Kono Manga ga Sugoi! list of the best manga of 2025 for male readers and Freestyle magazine's Kono Manga wo Yome! list of the best manga of 2025. The series was ranked fifth in the Nationwide Bookstore Employees' Recommended Comics list of 2025. It was nominated for the 18th Manga Taishō in 2025 and ranked third with 75 points. Girl Meets Rock! was nominated for the 9th Saito Takao Award in 2025.

Satoru Shoji of Japan Anime News wrote that unlike most works centered around school music clubs, such as K-On! and Bocchi the Rock!, Girl Meets Rock! takes a different approach by portraying the realistic emotions and actions of ordinary high school students, but called the manga itself "far from ordinary" due to subverting readers' expectations on upcoming plot developments and for depicting the struggles of characters without becoming too heavy in tone. He cited Chihiro's internal monologues as one of the highlights of the series, and believes readers will enjoy "being at the mercy" of master strategist Rin. Shoji expressed frustration that the English release changed the manga's title from "Ordinary Light Music Club"; a title that he described as "so profound that I could write an entire article just explaining it".

In Brutus, Kenta Terunuma concurred with Shoji, writing that despite many manga being set in light music clubs, the distinctive feature of Girl Meets Rock! is that the characters do not aim to make their professional debut or win a contest, and no dramatic events occur. However, he explained it is not simply a heartwarming work, as the ensemble story focuses on the human drama hidden in the small events of high school life.

Erica Friedman gave the first volume a perfect five-star rating in her review for Anime News Network. Calling it an "entertaining and relatable journey of self-exploration", she praised multiple aspects of the manga as realistic, and felt the skilled, but rough-edged, art style suited the work.

In a review of the first volume for School Library Journal, Brigid Alverson called Girl Meets Rock! a "highly readable high school drama with a large cast and perceptive writing" and praised the conversations and internal monologues as refreshingly blunt.

The Comics Beat's Adam Wescott criticized the English release for removing the lyrics to any real-life songs featured in the manga.

The song "Riyū Naki Hankō (The Rebel Age)" by A Flood of Circle went viral after it was included in Girl Meets Rock!. Frontman Ryosuke Sasaki credited this with helping sell tickets to the band's August 2024 concert at Hibiya Open-Air Concert Hall. Other recording acts who are admitted fans of the series include Acidman, Ado, Kana-Boon, Kyuso Nekokami and Hump Back, all of whom lent their names to a November 2024 poster promoting the manga.
