= Shōnen Jump+ =

Japanese manga online platform

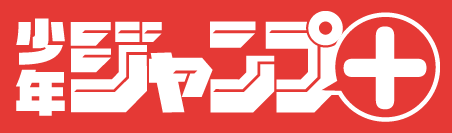
- Logo on the website of the publication
- Editors-in-chief: Seijiro Nakaji; Yūta Momiyama (Digital Service)
- Categories: Online manga platform
- Frequency: Weekly, bi-weekly, and monthly
- First issue: September 22, 2014
- Company: Shueisha
- Country: Japan
- Language: Japanese
- Website: shonenjumpplus.com

Shōnen Jump+ (Japanese: 少年ジャンプ+(プラス), Hepburn: Shōnen Janpu Purasu) is a manga platform created by Shueisha. Launched on September 22, 2014, it operates as a free mobile app and website. Jump+ serializes original titles and titles from other Shueisha manga magazines, and also carries digital editions of Weekly Shōnen Jump. Notable titles serialized in Shōnen Jump+ include Fire Punch, Chainsaw Man, Hell's Paradise: Jigokuraku, Spy × Family, Chained Soldier, Kaiju No. 8, and Dandadan.

Despite its title, Shōnen Jump+ also features series targeted towards female and adult readers in addition to its namesake shōnen manga, which is targeted towards young teen males. Outside of Japan, Shueisha releases the original manga from the platform on Manga Plus. Starting in 2023, every new manga series except for licensed manga and Indies series launched on Shōnen Jump+ would receive a simultaneous English release on Manga Plus.

== History ==
=== Pre-launch ===
Shueisha's Weekly Shōnen Jump reached a peak weekly circulation of 6.53 million copies in the 1990s, though its readership has since steadily declined as a result of the broader decline of the print media industry. In response, Shueisha turned towards digital distribution in an attempt to reach out to a wider audience.

A free digital edition of Weekly Shōnen Jump was issued as a result of the 2011 Tōhoku earthquake and tsunami, after shipping and distribution lines were affected by the disaster. Issuing the digital magazine was difficult at that time because of different work flows from issuing printed version. In 2012, Shueisha launched the online bookstore app Jump Book Store, which enjoyed mild commercial success and became an inspiration for Shōnen Jump+.

In 2013, Shueisha launched the online manga platform Jump LIVE. Although the app was downloaded over 1 million times in three weeks, the editorial department found it contained too much content and it was difficult to distinguish between free and paid content. Shueisha would ultimately discontinue the platform. Nevertheless, the experience of launching an online platform helped the company for the coming Shōnen Jump+.

=== Post-launch ===
Shōnen Jump+ was launched on September 22, 2014, with more than 30 manga series, some of which were transferred from Jump LIVE, including ēlDLIVE and Nekoda-biyori. The digital version of Weekly Shōnen Jump can be purchased in Shōnen Jump+ at 300 yen per issue or 900 yen per month. Compared to Weekly Shōnen Jump, titles published in Shōnen Jump+ are subject to laxer editorial restrictions around explicit content. According to Shuhei Hosono, the chief editor of Shōnen Jump+, the number of weekly active users increased from 1.1 million to 1.3 million between April and May 2016; Hosono noted that the increase was catalyzed by the release of Fire Punch and World's End Harem, which both contain depictions of sex and violence not permitted in Weekly Shōnen Jump. Starting from 2017, Weekly Shōnen Jump began serializing works made by manga artists who previously published their series on Shōnen Jump+, such as Taishi Tsutsui's We Never Learn, Tatsuki Fujimoto's Chainsaw Man, and Tsurun Hatomune's Mitama Security: Spirit Busters.

In 2019, the platform experienced significant progress. Spy × Family, which was a new series in 2019, attracted many users to the app, especially female users. After it began serialization, the proportion of female users increased by 5% while 60%-65% were male. Astra Lost in Space received an anime adaptation and Eren the Southpaw received a TV drama adaptation in 2019; both are original titles of Shōnen Jump+. Moreover, its original titles started to win big awards. Astra Lost in Space won the 12th Manga Taishō Award, becoming the first web comic to do so. Manga Plus, a global version of Shōnen Jump+, was launched on January 28, 2019. An international edition of Shōnen Jump+ was first proposed in 2017 as a means to appeal to non-Japanese audiences; the app is offered in English and Spanish. Also in 2019, Shueisha produced Marvel × Shōnen Jump+ Super Collaboration, a collaboration series with Marvel Comics composed of seven one-shots written by various Weekly Shōnen Jump artists including Yu-Gi-Oh!'s Kazuki Takahashi. In December 2020, Deadpool: Samurai started serialization on the same platform after the one-shot in October 2019.

In 2020, due to the COVID-19 pandemic, some titles in Shōnen Jump+ have been published on a modified schedule. A website namely "Jump Digital Labo" (ジャンプ・デジタルラボ) was launched by the editorial department of Shōnen Jump+ in July 2020, for recruiting proposals of digital development. Kaiju No. 8, which was serialized from July 2020 to July 2025, gained 30 million page views in October 2020, becoming the fastest Shōnen Jump+ manga to do so. On December 14, 2020, it was announced that the second part of Chainsaw Man, the first part of which had previously been serialized on Weekly Shōnen Jump, will be serialized on Shōnen Jump+. In April 2021, Indie series were introduced in the app. This is a side-project from the Shonen Jump+ App for Jump Rookie Monthly Award winner works that get in the platform with new titles every month along regular titles. These series have no editor, their publishing conditions differ from regular serializations and they have an orange flame symbol showing they are indie and how different they are from normal serializations. So far, only two Indies series became regular serializations: Red Cat Ramen and Kindergarten Wars. In 2023, every new manga series not including Indies series and licensed series launched on Shōnen Jump+ would begin to receive a simultaneous English release on Manga Plus.

== Metrics ==
By May 2019, over 60 titles were serialized on Shōnen Jump+. The app had been downloaded 10 million times; combined, the app and website had 2.5 million weekly active users. Shōnen Jump+ accumulated over 12 billion yen in sales revenue. As of February 2022, the app had been downloaded 19 million times, with the app and website having approximately 4.6 million weekly active users. Shueisha estimated Shōnen Jump+'s users to be 65% male, and that 18 to 24 year olds were its largest age demographic at 32%.

Hell's Paradise: Jigokuraku was the most popular series on the platform in 2018, while Spy × Family has been the most popular Shōnen Jump+ title since 2019. Spy × Family is noted for attracting readers, especially female, to the app, according to Hosono, the trend of its sales are comparable to Assassination Classroom, a high-profile title published in Weekly Shōnen Jump.

== Censorship ==
Due to explicit content, World's End Harem and Saotome Shimai wa Manga no Tame nara!? cannot be accessed on the Shōnen Jump+ iOS app, but they are available on its website and Android app.

== Series ==
There are currently 90 manga titles being serialized in Shōnen Jump+. Out of those, 69 are original titles to the platform, 8 titles are published in parallel with other Shueisha publications, and 11 are Indies series.

Series title	Author(s)	Premiered	Release day	Notes
Nekota Biyori (猫田びより)	Kuraku	September 22, 2014	Daily (Mon-Fri)	Transferred from Jump Live
Susume! Jump Heppoko Tanken-tai! (すすめ!ジャンプへっぽこ探検隊!)	Takeshi Sakurai	February 16, 2017	Once a month	
Oblivion Battery (忘却バッテリー)	Eko Mikawa	April 26, 2018	Every other Thursday	
Chained Soldier (魔都精兵のスレイブ, Mato Seihei no Sureibu)	Takahiro, Yōhei Takemura	January 5, 2019	Every other Saturday	
Spy × Family	Tatsuya Endo	March 25, 2019	Every other Monday	
Kiruru Kill Me (きるる KILL ME)	Yasuhiro Kanō	February 23, 2020	Every other Sunday	On indefinite hiatus
The 100 Girlfriends Who Really, Really, Really, Really, Really Love You (君のことが大大大大大好きな100人の彼女, Kimi no Koto ga Dai Dai Dai Dai Daisuki na 100-nin no Kanojo)	Rikito Nakamura, Yukiko Nozawa	February 23, 2020	Thursdays	In parallel with Weekly Young Jump
Ghost Reaper Girl (GHOST GIRL ゴーストガール, Gōsuto Gāru)	Akissa Saiké	July 13, 2020	Once a month	
Dandadan (ダンダダン)	Yukinobu Tatsu	April 6, 2021	Tuesdays	
Too Cute Crisis (カワイスギクライシス, Kawaisugi Kuraishisu)	Mitsuru Kido	July 13, 2021	Tuesdays	In parallel with Jump SQ
Make the Exorcist Fall in Love (エクソシストを堕とせない, Ekusoshisuto o Otosenai)	Aruma Arima, Masuku Fukayama	December 15, 2021	Every other Wednesday	
Red Cat Ramen (ラーメン赤猫, Ramen Aka Neko)	Angyaman	March 14, 2022	Mondays	Initially an Indies series, it transitioned to a regular series in October 2022
Dragon Quest: Dai no Daibouken – Yuusha Avan to Gokuen no Maou (ドラゴンクエスト ダイの大冒険 勇者アバンと獄炎の魔王, Doragon Kuesto: Dai no Daibouken Yuusha Avan to Gokuen no Maou)	Riku Sanjo, Yusaku Shibata	March 19, 2022	Saturdays	In parallel with V Jump
Junket Bank (ジャンケットバンク, Janketto Banku)	Ikkou Tanaka	March 30, 2022	Wednesdays	In parallel with Weekly Young Jump
One Piece Gakuen (ONE PIECE学園)	Sohei Koji, Eiichiro Oda	April 8, 2022	Every other Friday	In parallel with Saikyō Jump
Marriagetoxin (マリッジトキシン, Marijji Tokishin)	Jomyakun, Mizuki Yoda	April 20, 2022	Wednesdays	
My Only Weapon is a 1-Attack Power Needle (僕の武器は攻撃力1の針しかない, Boku no Buki wa Kougekiryoku 1 no Hari Shikanai)	Kamiyoshi, Nabetsuyo	September 11, 2022	Sundays	Indies series
Kindergarten Wars (幼稚園WARS, Youchien Wars)	You Chiba	September 15, 2022	Thursdays	Initially an Indies series, it transitioned to a regular series in March 2023
Dorei Yūgi DIDI (奴隷遊戯DIDI)	Mitsu Ibuka, Natsudou Munakata	December 31, 2022	On hiatus	Third part of Dorei Yūgi
Uma Musume Pretty Derby: Star Blossom (ウマ娘 プリティーダービー スターブロッサム)	Shin Hotani, Saki Monju	April 10, 2023	Mondays	In parallel with Tonari no Young Jump
Girl Meets Rock! (ふつうの軽音部, Futsu no Keionbu)	Kuwahali, Tetsuo Ideuchi	January 14, 2024	Sundays	
Thermae Romae Redux (続テルマエ・ロマエ, Zoku Thermae Romae)	Mari Yamazaki	February 6, 2024	Once a month	
Centuria (ケントゥリア, Kenturia)	Tohru Kuramori	April 8, 2024	Mondays	
RuriDragon (ルリドラゴン, Ruridoragon)	Masaoki Shindo	April 22, 2024	Every other Monday	In parallel with Weekly Shōnen Jump
Kaiju No. 8 Relax (怪獣8号 RELAX, Kaiju 8-go RELAX)	Naoya Matsumoto, Kizuku Watanabe	June 7, 2024	Every other Friday	In parallel with Saikyō Jump
Mad	Yusuke Otori	June 18, 2024	Every other Tuesday	
Shiba Inu Rooms (シバつき物件)	Esu Omori	June 27, 2024	Thursdays	
Empyreal Cabinet (天傍台閣, Tenbō Daikaku)	Fumiji Yuba	August 8, 2024	Once a month	
Strikeout Pitch (サンキューピッチ)	Kyu Sumiyoshi	September 3, 2024	Every other Tuesday	
Hero Organization (英雄機関, Eiyū Kikan)	Kei Saikawa, Akira Takahashi	September 15, 2024	Sundays	
Marginal OL Kirigiri Giriko (限界OL霧切ギリ子)	Mitosupa Tsuchimoto	September 24, 2024	Tuesdays	Indies series
Drama Queen (ドラマクイン)	Kuraku Ichikawa	December 2, 2024	Mondays	
Asura's Verdict (アスラの沙汰, Asura no Sata)	Utsugi Unohana	December 5, 2024	Every other Thursday	
Maison and the Man-Eating Apartment (人喰いマンションと大家のメゾン, Hitokui Mansion to Ooya no Maison)	Tanaka Kuu, Akima	March 7, 2025	Fridays	
War of the Adults (大人大戦, Otona Taisen)	Kappy, Tsuzuki Masaaki	April 5, 2025	Saturdays	
Kininaru Kurumi-san! (気になる来見さん！)	Kusunoki Shō	May 1, 2025	Thursdays	Indies series
Gunze Arabaki's Magnificently Maniacal Menagerie! (あらばけ！荒吐グングンパーク, Arabake! Arabaki Gungun Park)	Kyosuke Usuta	May 9, 2025	Fridays	
Class of Brains (群脳教室, Gun nō Kyōshitsu)	Kenji Ishima	June 18, 2025	Wednesdays	
Kurumizawa's Folly (来見沢善彦の愚行, Kurumizawa Yoshihiko no Guko)	Tokiwa Yohira	September 6, 2025	Saturdays	
WITCHRIV	Hakuri	October 23, 2025	Thursdays	
Hatori and Furuta's Extraordinarily Ordinary Life (羽鳥と古田の非日常茶飯事, Hatori to Furuta no Hi Nichijochahanji)	Daijirou Nonoue	December 13, 2025	Every other Saturday	
.A -dot Alice- (.A-ドットアリス-)	Takuya Nishio	December 16, 2025	Every other Tuesday	
Shunrai Table Tennis (春雷卓球, Shunrai Takkyū)	Masahiro Hirakata	December 26, 2025	Fridays	
Island Rock (島ロック, Shima Rock)	Manose, Miharu	December 30, 2025	Every other Tuesday	
Love Through a Prism (プリズム輪舞曲, Prism Rondo)	Yoko Kamio, Maki Minami	January 8, 2026	Every other Thursday	In parallel with Manga Mee
The Struggle Is Real with Giriko Kirigiri! (限界OL霧切ギリ子, Genkai OL Kirigiri Giriko)	Mītosupa Tsuchimoto	February 17, 2026	Tuesdays	
ROAD☆STAR (ドーロ☆スター, Dōro Sutā)	Katsunori Hana	February 24, 2026	Every other Tuesday	
Blobtopia (ブヨトピア, Buyotopia)	Jun Kirarazaka	March 13, 2026	Fridays	
The Oracles of Kami (神ヨムふたり, Kami Yomu Futari)	Fibi Dori	March 19, 2026	Every other Thursday	
Axed Mangaka and Doujin Creator (打ち切られ漫画家と同人女, Uchikirare Mangakka to Doujin Onna)	Hibito Sumi	March 30, 2026	Every other Monday	
Subaru the Invincible (無敵のスバル, Muteki no Subaru)	Nariaki Narita	April 12, 2026	Sundays	
The Chrysalis Heart (サナギの心臓, Sanagi no Shinzō)	Akari Kajimoto	April 17, 2026	Fridays	
Hitoner (ヒトナー, Hitonā)	Tomohiro Yagi	April 22, 2026	Every other Wednesday	
SATANICA	Kuroha	May 9, 2026	Every other Saturday	
World Wide Web MIKO! (世界を繋ぎ尽くすインターネット巫女, Sekai wo Tsunagi Tsukusu Intānetto Miko)	Kogattuo, Ichika Kino	May 29, 2026	Fridays	
Lunolita (ルノリータ, Runorīta)	Kinoshi Wata	May 31, 2026	Sundays	
Hey! Devil Girl! (あっ、悪魔ちゃん, A, Akuma-chan)	Zao Fukatsu	June 6, 2026	Saturdays	
Twilight Blade (あわいの焔刃, Awai no Enjin)	Chiyoko Maruume, Tokegoro	June 10, 2026	Wednesdays	
MikotoHako (みことはこ)	Shintaro Tengan	August 4, 2026	Every other Tuesday	
Finding the Invisible Star (七等星をみつけて, Nanatōsei o Mitsukete)	Sango Honda	August 6, 2026	Thursdays	
Mayori Academy (魔資リの学校, Mayori no Gakko)	Tatsu Murakoshi	August 17, 2026	Every other Monday	
KAKAKAKA (科科科科)	Mukade Makino	August 26, 2026	Wednesdays	
Noisering (ノイズリング, Noizuringu)	Kanya Aku, Tsubasa	September 1, 2026	Tuesdays	
Ayaru's Brush with Romance (イッピツアヤル, Ippitsuayaru)	Hidari Yokoyama	September 13, 2026	Sundays	
Evangeline Puts on Shoes (エヴァンジェリンは靴を履く, Evangeline wa Kutsu o Haku)	Ryosuke Asakura	September 16, 2026	Wednesdays	
Slap Shot Girls (スラップショットガールス, Surappushotto gārusu)	Alpa	September 29, 2026	Tuesdays	
Noro-Noro Puku-Puku (のろのろぷくぷく)	Chanta	October 5, 2026	Mondays	

== See also ==
- Shonen Jump digital vault
