= Next Manga Award =

Japanese manga award

- Awarded for: Best new manga series
- Country: Japan
- Presented by: Da Vinci; Niconico
- First award: 2015
- Website: tsugimanga.jp

The Next Manga Award (Japanese: 次にくるマンガ大賞, Hepburn: Tsugi ni Kuru Manga Taishō) is an annual award for manga series presented by Kadokawa Corporation's Da Vinci magazine and Niconico streaming website.

== Overview ==
The award was originally established on October 6, 2014, as a collaboration between Kadokawa Corporation's Da Vinci magazine and its Niconico streaming website. The award is divided into two categories, the first is for manga that have been published in print publications, and the second for series published online. In order for a series to be eligible, it must be currently serializing and have no more than five volumes published or have started serialization after January 1. The final decision is made by having fans vote. Until 2021, voting was restricted to Japan. However, in 2021 an English website was launched which allowed voting from outside Japan too.

== Recipients ==
Year	Print	Web	Ref.
2015	My Hero Academia by Kōhei Horikoshi	Wotakoi: Love Is Hard for Otaku by Fujita	
2016	Straighten Up! Welcome to Shika High's Competitive Dance Club by Takuma Yokota	Tomo-chan Is a Girl! by Fumita Yanagida	
2017	Kaguya-sama: Love Is War by Aka Akasaka	Life Lessons with Uramichi Oniisan by Gaku Kuze	
2018	Yakuza Fiancé: Raise wa Tanin ga Ii by Asuka Konishi	My Senpai Is Annoying by Shiro Manta	
2019	The Apothecary Diaries by Itsuki Nanao, Hyūganatsu, and Nekokurage	Spy × Family by Tatsuya Endo	
2020	Undead Unluck by Yoshifumi Tozuka	The Dangers in My Heart by Norio Sakurai	
2021	Oshi no Ko by Aka Akasaka and Mengo Yokoyari	Kaiju No. 8 by Naoya Matsumoto	
2022	Medalist by Tsurumaikada	Smoking Behind the Supermarket with You by Jinushi	
2023	Even the Student Council Has Its Holes! by Muchimaro	The Guy She Was Interested in Wasn't a Guy at All by Sumiko Arai	
2024	Kagurabachi by Takeru Hokazono	Girl Meets Rock! by Kuwahali and Tetsuo Ideuchi	
2025	Ichi the Witch by Osamu Nishi and Shiro Usazaki	Strikeout Pitch by Kyu Sumiyoshi	
2026	Someone Hertz by Ei Yamano	Home at the Horizon by Taiyō Watabe	
