= Moriarty (name) =

Irish surname

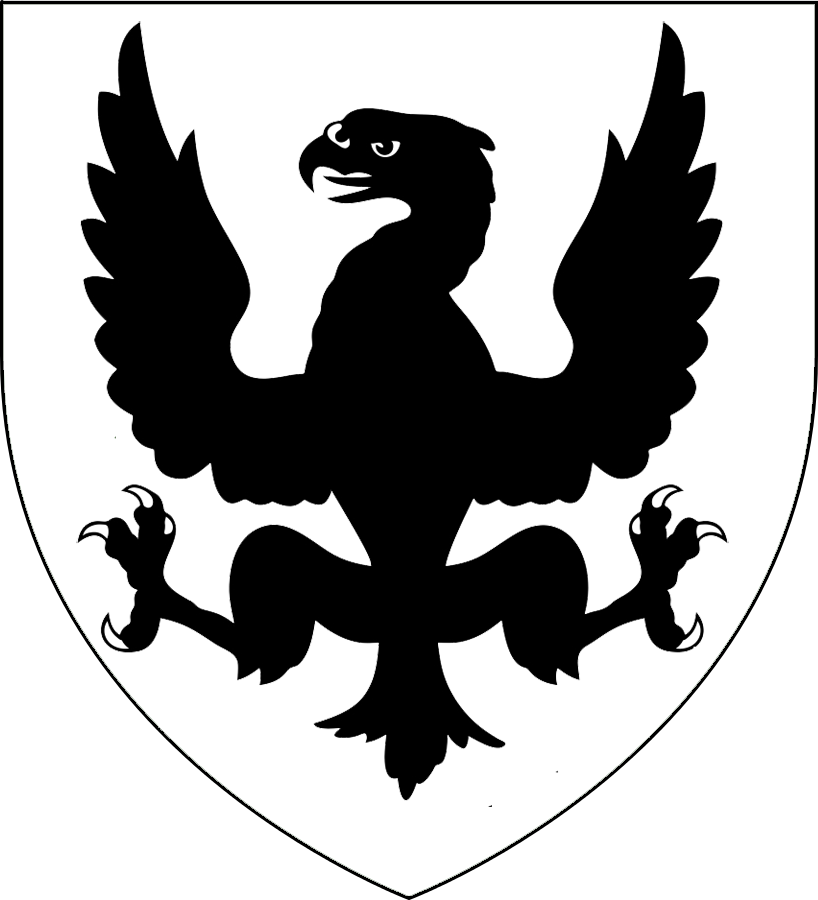
- Coat of arms of the Moriartys
- Pronunciation: /ˌmɒriˈɑːrti/

Origin
- Language: Irish
- Meaning: navigator
- Region of origin: Ireland

Other names
- Variant form: Ó Muircheartaigh

Moriarty is an Irish surname originating in County Kerry. It represents an anglicisation of Ó Muircheartaigh ([oː ˈmˠɪɾʲɪçaɾˠt̪ˠiː]), meaning "descendant of Muircheartach". The latter is a personal name meaning "skilled navigator" (from muir, "sea", and ceardach, "skilled").

Using documentary evidence, flavoured by legend, researchers have isolated historical data using books by O'Hart, McLysaght and O'Brien, the Four Masters, baptismals, parish records, and ancient land grants. Despite the loss of records caused by the fire in the Dublin Records Office in 1922 which was an irreparable disaster to Irish historians, sufficient evidence is still available to produce a thumbnail sketch of the Moriarty history.

Conclusions by these researchers show that the family name Moriarty was first found in County Kerry.

The Moriarty family is an ancient member of the Gaelic Nobility of Ireland.

Spelling variations of the names were found in the archives researched, particularly when families attempted to translate the name from the Gaelic to the English. Although the name Moriarty occurred in many references, from time to time the surname was also officially recorded as O'Moriarty, Murtagh, Murtag, Murtaugh, McMoriarty, O'Murtagh, and these changes in spelling frequently occurred, even between father and son. Preferences for different spelling variations usually arose from a division of the family, or for religious reasons, or sometimes patriotic reasons.

== Migrants ==
In North America, some of the first migrants which could be considered kinsmen of the sept Moriarty of that same family were Daniel, Ellen, Eugene, Margaret, Michael, Thomas Moriarty, who all settled in Boston in 1849; and James, John, Martin, Maurice, and Michael Moriarty, who all arrived in Philadelphia between 1840 and 1860.

One Edward Moriarte (c. 1644, Kerry, Lower Ormund, County Tipperary, Ireland) died in Anne Arundel County, Maryland, c. 1688.

While a direct connection to Edward has not been made (and therefore the immigrant ancestor is not known), a family with surnames Meratta, Muratta, Marattay, Maratty, and so forth migrated from Maryland to Pennsylvania before 1790, and members migrated to the Nelson County/Spencer County region of Kentucky (outside Louisville) about 1805.

== People with the surname ==
- Abram Moriarty (1830–1918), Irish-born Australian politician
- Ambrose Moriarty (1870–1949), English prelate of the Roman Catholic Church, former Bishop of Shrewsbury
- Barbara Moriarty (1902–1979), Australian Red Cross administrator and nurse
- Bill Moriarty (baseball) (1883–1916), American baseball player briefly active in 1909
- Brendan Moriarty, American film director and Media owner of The Cambodian Journal
- Brian Moriarty (born 1956), computer game author mostly known for Trinity and Loom
- Cathy Moriarty (born 1960), American actress nominated for a Best Supporting Actress Academy Award for her role in Raging Bull
- Cecil Moriarty (1877–1958), Irish-born Chief Constable of Birmingham and rugby international
- Chris Moriarty (born 1968), an American science fiction and fantasy writer
- Christopher Moriarty (1936–2024), an Irish naturalist and author
- Clare Moriarty, British civil servant
- Colm Moriarty (born 1979), Irish professional golfer
- Dan Moriarty (footballer, born 1875) (1875–1903), Australian rules footballer
- Dan Moriarty (footballer, born 1895) (1895–1982), Australian rules footballer
- David Moriarty (1814–1877), Irish Roman Catholic bishop and pulpit orator
- David H. Moriarty (1911–1989), American sound engineer
- Ed Moriarty (1912–1991), American Major League Baseball player
- Edward Orpen Moriarty (1824–1896), Australian civil engineer
- Erin Moriarty (actress) (born 1994), American actress
- Erin Moriarty (journalist) (born 1952), American television news reporter
- Fiach Moriarty (fl. 2010–present), Irish singer-songwriter
- Gene Moriarty (1863–1904), American Major League Baseball outfielder
- Geoff Moriarty (1871–1948), Australian rules footballer
- George Moriarty (1884–1964), American Major League Baseball player, manager and umpire
- George Andrews Moriarty, Jr (1883–1968), American genealogist
- Greg Moriarty (born 1964), Australian public servant and diplomat
- Jack Moriarty (1901–1980), Australian rules footballer
- Jacob Moriarty (born 1994), birth name of Jacob Collier; English singer, songwriter, multi-instrumentalist, producer and educator
- James Moriarty (disambiguation)
  - Jim Moriarty (born 1953), New Zealand actor and theatre director
- Jeffrey Moriarty, American philosopher
- Jeremiah J. Moriarty (1914–1995), New York politician and judge
- Jerry Moriarty (born 1938), American artist
- Joan Moriarty (1923–2020), nursing sister, Matron-in-Chief/Director of the Queen Alexandra's Royal Army Nursing Corps from 1977 to 1981
- Joan Denise Moriarty (early 1910s?–1992), Irish dancer, teacher and choreographer, founder of professional ballet in Ireland
- John Moriarty (disambiguation)
- Joseph J. Moriarty (1884–1963), American politician and judge
- Joseph Vincent Moriarty (1910–1979), Irish-American mobster
- Judith Moriarty (born 1942), American politician
- Kieran Moriarty, British physician
- Larry Moriarty (born 1958), American former National Football League player
- Laura Moriarty (writer, born 1970), American author from Hawaii
- Laura Moriarty (writer, born 1952), American poet and novelist from Minnesota
- Lee Moriarty (born 1994), American professional wrestler
- Liane Moriarty (born 1966), Australian author
- Mary Moriarty, an American attorney and politician
- Michael Moriarty (disambiguation)
- Merion Moriarty (1794–1864), Irish-born Australian politician
- Owen O'Moriarty (1500s–1600s), Irish chieftain
- P. H. Moriarty (1939–2025), British actor
- P. J. Moriarty, restaurateur
- Paddy Moriarty, Gaelic footballer from Northern Ireland in the 1970s
- Pat Moriarty (American football) (born 1955), football executive for the National Football League's Baltimore Ravens
- Patrick Moriarty (disambiguation)
- Paul Moriarty (disambiguation)
- Philip Moriarty (born 1968), Irish physicist and professor of physics at the University of Nottingham
- Richard Moriarty (born 1957), Welsh former international rugby union captain
- Robert J. Moriarty (born 1946), American Marine fighter pilot
- Ross Moriarty (born 1994), Welsh international rugby union player
- Stephen Moriarty (born 1949), American politician
- Teague Moriarty (born 1983), American chef
- Terry Moriarty (1925–2011), Australian rules footballer
- Thomas Moriarty (1812–1894), Church of Ireland clergyman
- Tom Moriarty (born 1953), American former National Football League player
- William Moriarty (1890–1936), a leader of the Communist Party of Canada who sided with the Right Opposition

== See also ==
- Moriarty (disambiguation)
- Jay Moriarity, American surfer
- Mícheál Ó Muircheartaigh, Irish Gaelic Games commentator
