= Costello's =

Bar and restaurant in New York City (1929–1992)

Coordinates: 40°45′06″N 73°58′20″W

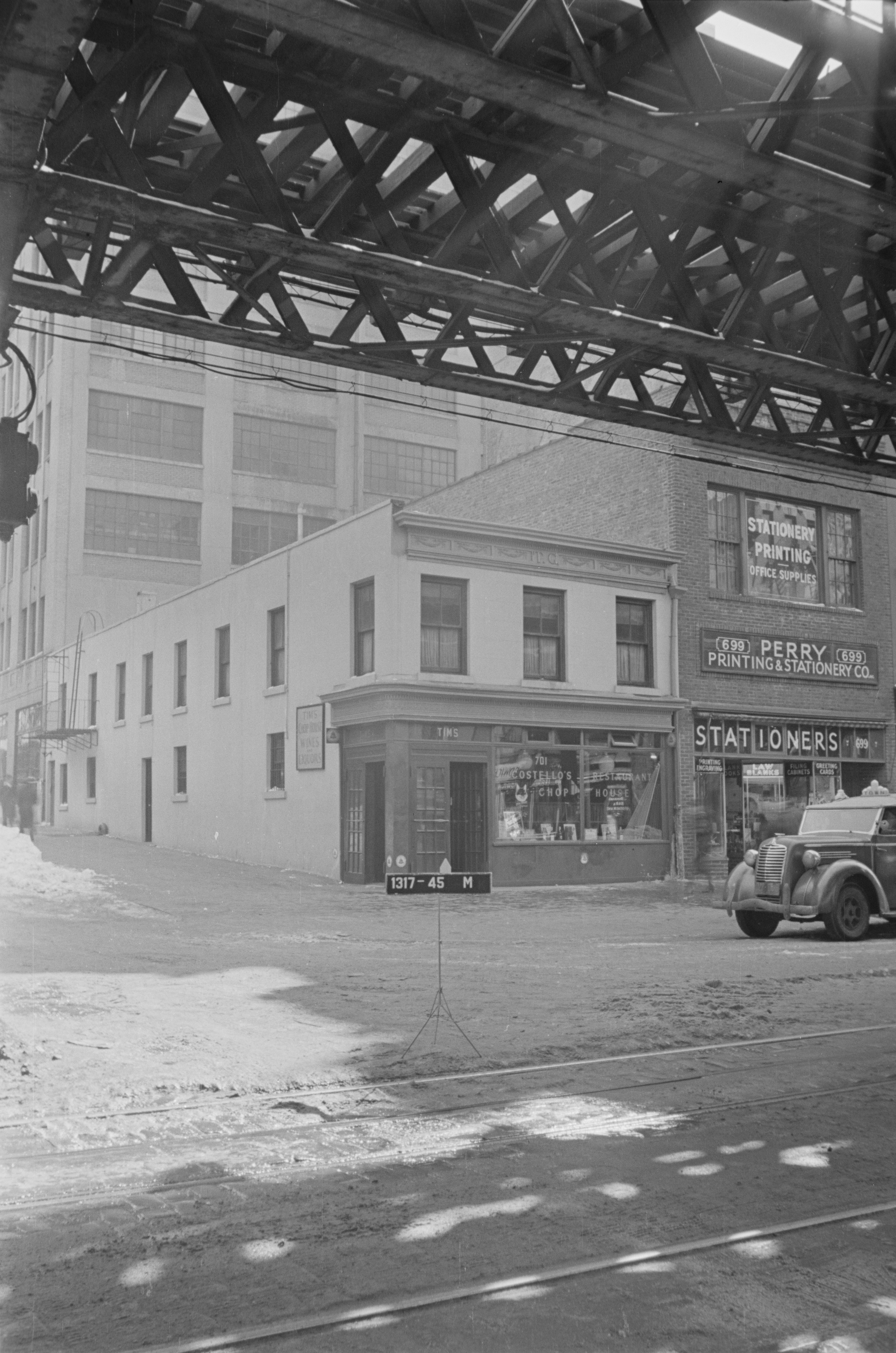
Costello's on the corner of Third Avenue and East 44th Street, under the shadow of the Third Avenue El, c. 1939–1941 (Note: This photograph was taken by employees of the Works Progress Administration as part of a project to modernize New York City's tax records.)

Costello's (also known as Tim's) was a bar and restaurant in Midtown Manhattan, New York City, from 1929 to 1992. The bar operated at several locations near the intersection of East 44th Street and Third Avenue. Costello's was known as a drinking spot for journalists with the New York Daily News, writers with The New Yorker, novelists, and cartoonists, including the author Ernest Hemingway, the cartoonist James Thurber, the journalist John McNulty, the poet Brendan Behan, the short-story writer John O'Hara, and the writers Maeve Brennan and A. J. Liebling. The bar is also known for having been home to a wall where Thurber drew a cartoon depiction of the "Battle of the Sexes" at some point in 1934 or 1935; the cartoon was destroyed, illustrated again, and then lost in the 1990s. A wall illustrated in 1976 by several cartoonists, including Bill Gallo, Stan Lee, Mort Walker, Al Jaffee, Sergio Aragonés, and Dik Browne, is still on display at the bar's final location.

The bar was founded in 1929 as a speakeasy on Third Avenue by brothers Tim and Joe Costello, who had emigrated to the United States from Ireland. Tim was known as an affable, intelligent proprietor with an interest in literature. In the early 1930s, the bar moved to the corner of East 44th Street and Third Avenue, before moving one door away on Third Avenue in 1949. The bar moved to its final location at 225 East 44th Street in 1974. Costello's closed in 1992; the Turtle Bay Café took over the space, operating until 2005. Since then, the location has been occupied by a sports bar called the Overlook. The bar is remembered through the stories that have been told about it over the years. The writer John McNulty is credited with creating a mythology around Costello's—which he called "this place on Third Avenue"—through a series of short stories published in The New Yorker in the 1940s.

== Early years (1929–1950s) ==
Tim Costello (September 5, 1895 – November 7, 1962) and his brother Joe opened the eponymous Costello's (also known as Tim's) in 1929 (during prohibition) as a speakeasy—a bar illicitly selling alcohol—in Midtown Manhattan, New York City. (Note: Based on a review of census records, the genealogist Sharon DeBartolo Carmack wrote that she did not believe that Tim opened a bar until at least 1933, and that Joe was likely not involved in the bar's operation.) It was located on Third Avenue near the East 44th Street intersection and under the Third Avenue El. Tim and Joe were born and raised in Ferbane, Ireland, to James and Teresa (née Flynn), who owned a drapery shop. As a young adult, Tim worked as a taxi driver in Dublin. He was arrested in 1922 for dangerous driving, sentenced to three months in prison, and fined £10 (equivalent to $491 in 2025). (Note: UK Consumer Price Index inflation figures from 1209–2024 based on data from "Inflation calculator". Bank of England. London. February 18, 2026.) Tim emigrated to the United States in 1927; in transit, he met his future wife, Kathleen Gordon. Tim was known as an affable, intellectual proprietor, who was knowledgeable about literature, opinionated about art, and often well-dressed in a Brooks Brothers suit.

After the 1933 repeal of the prohibition of alcohol in the United States, Costello's moved to 701 Third Avenue, on the corner of Third Avenue and East 44th Street. (Note: Tim Costello's 1962 obituary in The New York Times stated that the bar was on the southeast corner. In 1972, a Times reporter wrote that the bar was on the southwest corner, but in 1973 a different Times reporter stated that it was on the northeast corner.) From opening at 701 Third Avenue through World War II, Costello's and its neighbor P. J. Clarke's "were the great egalitarian mixers of New York", according to a 1976 story in The New York Times, where "chauffeurs, ice-men, taxi drivers and hod carriers" dined and drank with writers, journalists, and artists. Contributors to The New Yorker, columnists and reporters for the New York Daily News, correspondents with the Associated Press and United Press International, and cartoonists for Yank Magazine, as well as people working in the Madison Avenue advertising industry, were attracted to Costello's because of its proprietor's literary knowledge and charm. The journalist John McNulty, a regular at the bar, described it as "somewhat dim and dusty" and "run in a catch-as-catch-can style, with no efficiency at all". Other notable regulars included the author Ernest Hemingway, the cartoonist James Thurber, the poet Brendan Behan, the short-story writer John O'Hara, and the writers Maeve Brennan and A. J. Liebling. In 1949, Costello's moved one door south to 699 Third Avenue.

== Later years (1960s–1992) ==
When Tim died in 1962 at the age of 67, his son Timothy Costello inherited and continued operating the business. In the 1970s, Costello's began to change along with the neighborhood, which was being developed by larger businesses and facing increasing rents. By 1972, Costello's was no longer a gathering place for authors and journalists; rather, according to Timothy Costello, it catered to businesspeople, whom he referred to as "technicians". The bartender John Gallagher said that many of their customers worked on Wall Street. Through the 1970s, however, some Daily News journalists continued to frequent the bar.

Costello's was evicted from 699 Third Avenue in 1973 because the building's owners intended to tear the building down; the Times reported that a spokesperson for the building's owner said "Yes, ... it's too bad about Costello's." Despite claiming that he could not afford rent in the neighborhood, Timothy Costello reopened the following year at 225 East 44th Street. Costello's closed in the morning of February 29, 1992, in part as a result of the early 1990s recession. Later that year, a dive bar called The Turtle Bay Café moved into the location. The bar was frequented by diplomats, United Nations employees, and the cast and crew of the soap opera Guiding Light. 225 East 44th Street has been occupied by a sports bar called the Overlook since 2004. Regarding the closure of Costello's, the wines and spirits journalist Robert Simonson observed: "How quickly the character drains from things in 21st-century New York."

== Cartoon walls ==
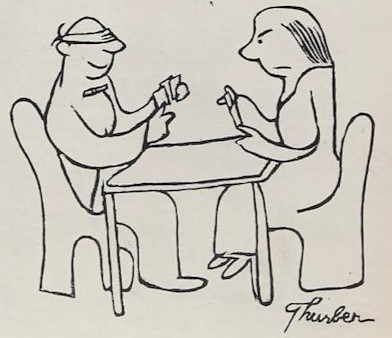
Illustration from Battle of the Sexes following its 1972 restoration

Costello's was decorated with illustrations that were painted and drawn directly on the walls by several notable cartoonists, including James Thurber, Bill Gallo, Stan Lee, Mort Walker, Al Jaffee, Sergio Aragonés, and Dik Browne. At some point from 1934–1935, when Costello's was located at 701 Third Avenue, Thurber illustrated the walls, depicting the Battle of the Sexes. The journalist Jacquin Sanders described the cartoons as black and white illustrations that were "full of large, angry women, small, cowed men and regretful dogs".

There are several conflicting accounts of when and how Thurber completed the cartoon. The New York Times journalist Murray Schumach wrote that he borrowed the keys to the bar and painted the cartoon in one day in the winter of 1935. Susan Edmiston and Linda D. Cirino reported that, one night, he drew the cartoon in 90 minutes. By contrast, the Times journalist Robert Tomasson stated that Thurber worked throughout 1934–1935; he would arrive to the bar late at night, working from booth to booth, and in the morning, the walls would be varnished to preserve the illustrations. The cartoon was accidentally destroyed when painters hired by Tim Costello painted over them. Thurber then again illustrated the wall with a similar cartoon. In 1949, that section of the wall was removed and moved to the bar's new location at 699 Third Avenue. On April 8, 1972, several cartoonists who had worked for Yank Magazine during World War II restored the illustrations. The Thurber cartoons were brought to the bar's final location at 701, where they were only occasionally displayed. The Thurber cartoons disappeared in the 1990s.

In 1976, two years after Costello's moved to its final location, Timothy Costello enlisted the cartoonist Bill Gallo, who was then president of the National Cartoonists Society, to illustrate one of the walls. Gallo initially declined because he "didn't want to compete with Thurber". Eventually, he struck a deal with Costello to close the bar and provide free food and drink for the approximately 40 cartoonists who contributed to the wall, including Stan Lee, Mort Walker, Al Jaffee, Sergio Aragonés, and Dik Browne. The wall features characters such as Hägar the Horrible, Beetle Bailey, and Spider-Man. In 2005, the cartoonist Bill Kresse called the wall the "Sistine Chapel" of the National Cartoonists Society.

When the Overlook took over the lease in 2004, there was fear that the cartoons would be removed during renovations. The Overlook's owner denied that they had intended to remove the cartoons; instead, they preserved the cartoons—including old graffiti—under glass. Gallo and two dozen other cartoonists returned in 2005 at the invitation of the Overlook's owner to illustrate a corner of the bar. In 2009, the wines and spirits journalist Robert Simonson wrote that the 2005 illustrations "feel like wan attempts to recapture a more glorious artistic past", noting that each of the characters had been given dialogue advertising the Overlook.

== Legacy ==
Costello's is a part of the stories and mythologies of several writers. John McNulty wrote about the discussions and happenings at the bar, which he called "this place on Third Avenue", in the 1940s in a series of short stories for The New Yorker. In those stories, McNulty recorded the bar's customers and staff, their doings, and their discussions. The journalist Thomas Vinciguerra called McNulty's short stories "rambling yarns with titles as long and shaggy as the stories themselves". According to the journalist George Frazier in Esquire, "there were those New Yorker writers who considered it unthinkable to hand in their manuscripts to the magazine before getting [Tim Costello's] approval".

In one oft-repeated story about Costello's—which was recorded in The Oxford Book of American Literary Anecdotes—in the spring of 1944, Ernest Hemingway and John O'Hara bet $50 (equivalent to $914 in 2025) (Note: 1634–1699: McCusker, J. J. (1997). How Much Is That in Real Money? A Historical Price Index for Use as a Deflator of Money Values in the Economy of the United States: Addenda et Corrigenda (PDF). American Antiquarian Society. 1700–1799: McCusker, J. J. (1992). How Much Is That in Real Money? A Historical Price Index for Use as a Deflator of Money Values in the Economy of the United States (PDF). American Antiquarian Society. 1800–present: Federal Reserve Bank of Minneapolis. "Consumer Price Index (estimate) 1800–".) that Hemingway could not break a blackthorn cane over O'Hara's head. Hemingway then proceeded to do so. (Note: In his biography of O'Hara, the English literature scholar Matthew J. Bruccoli wrote that Hemingway broke the cane over his own head, not O'Hara's.) The cane was allegedly a gift from John Steinbeck, who was reportedly "disgusted by the incident and lost any personal admiration he had for Hemingway". The two halves of the broken cane were displayed over the bar until Costello's closed.

== See also ==
- Neary's
- P. J. Moriarty

== Sources ==
=== Books ===
- Batterberry, Michael; Batterberry, Ariane (1999) [First published 1973, New York: Scribner]. On the Town in New York: The Landmark History of Eating, Drinking, and Entertainments from the American Revolution to the Food Revolution (25th anniversary special ed.). New York: Routledge. ISBN 978-0-415-92020-9 – via Google Books.
- Bruccoli, Matthew J. (1995) [First published 1975]. The O'Hara Concern: A Biography of John O'Hara. University of Pittsburgh Press. ISBN 978-0-822-95559-7 – via Google Books.
- Edmiston, Susan; Cirino, Linda D. (1976). Literary New York: A history and Guide. Boston: Houghton Mifflin. ISBN 978-0-395-24349-7 – via Internet Archive.
- McNulty, John (2001). "This Place on Third Avenue". This Place on Third Avenue: The New York Stories of John McNulty. Berkeley, Cal.: Counterpoint Press. p. 3. ISBN 978-1-58243-213-7 – via Google Books.
- Morgan, Jack (2011). New World Irish: Notes on One Hundred Years of Lives and Letters in American Culture (eBook ed.). New York: Palgrave Macmillan. doi:10.1057/9781137001269. ISBN 978-1-137-00126-9 – via Springer Link.
- O'Connor, Richard (1970). John Steinbeck. New York: McGraw-Hill. OCLC 76640 – via Internet Archive.
- Via, Maria (2006). "Douglas Warner Gorsline: Bar Scene, 1942" (PDF). In Searl, Marjorie B.; Blanpied, John W. (eds.). Seeing America: Painting and Sculpture from the Collection of the Memorial Art Gallery of the University of Rochester. University of Rochester Press. pp. 249–253. ISBN 978-1-58046-244-0. Archived from the original on July 12, 2024.
- Vinciguerra, Thomas J. (2016). Cast of Characters: Wolcott Gibbs, E. B. White, James Thurber, and the Golden Age of The New Yorker (eBook ed.). New York: W. W. Norton & Company. ISBN 978-0-393-24874-6.

=== Newspaper, magazine, and journal articles ===
- Arden, Patrick (November 20, 2005). "Immortality on 44th St". Metro New York. Archived from the original on February 5, 2023.
- "Business Leases". The New York Times. May 4, 1940. p. 28. ProQuest 105345567. "Timothy Costello, bar and grill, renewal in 701 3d Ave ...."
- Deacy, Jack (March 13, 1972). "Paddy's Day Primer". New York. Vol. 5, no. 11. p. 64 – via Google Books.
- Frazier, George (April 1968). "The Time of Tim and Such". Esquire. Vol. 69, no. 4. pp. 64–76 – via Internet Archive.
- Esperdy, Gabrielle (2004). "A Taxing Photograph: The WPA Real Property Survey of New York City". History of Photography. 28 (2): 123–136. doi:10.1080/03087298.2004.10441301 – via Taylor & Francis.
- Karpen, Lynn (June 24, 2001). "This Place on Third Avenue". Books in Brief: Nonfiction. The New York Times Book Review. p. 24. Archived from the original on May 27, 2015.
- Kates, Brian (January 11, 2004). "Mural May Be History: Famed Cartoon Wall Facing Wrecking Ball". New York Daily News. Archived from the original on July 3, 2019.
- Kazin, Alfred (August 30, 1981). "'How Do You Look When I'm Sober?'". The New York Times Book Review. p. 3. ProQuest 121686656. Archived from the original on March 7, 2016.
- Loh, Jules (March 12, 1989). "Patrons Come Just to Watch Herbie: World's Worst Waiter Turns Tables on Doubters". Los Angeles Times. Associated Press. Archived from the original on November 29, 2022.
- Lamb, Matt (September 13, 2019). "Midtown's 'The Overlook' Bar Sports a Comic-Strip Wall Filled with Famous Funnies". NBC New York. Archived from the original on January 18, 2022.
- Magnet, Alec (November 21, 2005). "Cartoonists Create Mural To Mirror Another at Famed Midtown Bar". The New York Sun. Archived from the original on July 19, 2024.
- Oderwald, Benjamin T.; Gibson, Christine (October 2004). "The Faces On The Barroom Wall". American Heritage. Vol. 55, no. 5. Archived from the original on April 12, 2024.
- Sanders, Jacquin (March 15, 1990). "Memories Belly Up to Bar". St. Petersburg Times (city ed.). p. 1B. ProQuest 262720009. Archived from the original on July 19, 2024.
- Santangelo, Mike (March 1, 1992). "The Last Round at Tim Costello's". Newsday (city ed.). p. 44. ProQuest 278510587.
- Schumach, Murray (April 9, 1972). "Thurber Creatures 'Live' Again in Bar Here". The New York Times. p. 70. Archived from the original on May 30, 2024.
- Severo, Richard (February 23, 1976). "The El Is Gone, the Scene Is Ritzier But Is Old Third Ave. Any Better Off?". The New York Times. pp. 27, 47. Archived from the original on July 15, 2024.
- "Tim Costello, Host to Writers at 3d Ave. Establishment, Dead". The New York Times. November 8, 1962. p. 39. ProQuest 115760379.
- Tomasson, Robert E. (October 3, 1973). "Old Haunt of Literati, Costello's, Is Closing". The New York Times. p. 49. Archived from the original on January 29, 2022.
- Vadukul, Alex (May 11, 2018). "The Sistine Chapel of Comic-Strip Art". The New York Times. Archived from the original on December 22, 2022.

=== Websites ===
- Carmack, Sharon DeBartolo (May 14, 2021). "How an Irish Barman Created a Home for New York's Literary Elite". Literary Hub. Archived from the original on July 13, 2024.
- "701 3 Avenue". New York City Department of Records & Information Services. Archived from the original on July 23, 2024.
- O'Toole, Kelli (2018). "Guide to the 1940s Tax Department Photographs, 1939–1951" (PDF). Collection No. REC 0040. New York City Municipal Archives. Archived (PDF) from the original on July 8, 2024.
- Simonson, Robert (November 13, 2009). "Overlook Lounge, on 44th Street". Eater. Archived from the original on May 28, 2023.
