= Waneko =

Polish publishing company

Waneko sp. z o.o.
- Type: Limited liability company
- Industry: Publishing
- Founded: 1999
- Headquarters: Warsaw
- Area served: Poland
- Key people: Aleksandra Watanuki, Martyna Taniguchi, Kenichiro Watanuki
- Products: manga, educational books, other books
- Website: http://www.waneko.pl/

Waneko is a Polish manga publisher, located in Warsaw, Poland. The founders of Waneko are Aleksandra Watanuki, Martyna Taniguchi and Kenichiro Watanuki.

== Titles published ==
=== Manga ===
- Astro Royale
- Baby Violet
- Bitewny zew - The Bugle Call
- Bless
- Boskie Łuski
- Boys Run the Riot
- Black Torch
- Blue Lock
- Blue Period
- Bungou Stray Dogs
- Bungou Stray Dogs Beast
- Bungou Stray Dogs Dead Apple
- Bungou Stray Dogs Ayatsuji vs. Kyougoku Natsuhiko
- Chainsaw Man
- Chi's Sweet Home
- Choujin X
- Co kryje się pod futrem
- Chłopak, który jej się spodobał wcale nie jest chłopakiem
- Cardcaptor Sakura
- Citrus+
- Czarodziejki.net
- D.Gray-man
- Darling in the Franxx
- Dimension W
- Do Adolfów
- Doctor Mephistopheles
- Dolly Kill Kill
- Dororo i Hyakkimaru
- Dr. Stone
- Dragon Head
- Dragon Head - Edycja specjalna
- Dragons Rioting
- Dungeon Meshi
- Durarara!! Yellow Flag Orchestra
- Dziecię Bestii
- Dziewczyna do wynajęcia
- Enra z piekła rodem
- Fire Force
- Frau Faust
- Freyja - fałszywy książę
- Fruits Basket
- Gangsta
- Go! Go! Loser Ranger!
- Grzechy rodziny Ichinose
- Grzesznicy lazurowej otchłani
- Gwiazda spadająca za dnia
- Heart Gear
- Herezja miłości
- Homunculus
- Homunculus - Edycja specjalna
- Hunter × Hunter
- Inkwizytor Wiedźm
- Inspektor Akane Tsunemori
- Jealousy
- Jujutsu Kaisen
- Jujutsu Kaisen 0
- Kabukicho Bad Trip
- Kakegurui
- Kakegurui Twin
- Kasane
- Katekyo Hitman Reborn!
- Kocha, nie kocha...
- Kronika duchów
- Królestwo Kwarcu
- Królestwo Kwarcu - Edycja Specjalna
- Kto widział taniec pawia?
- Kulinarne pojedynki
- Kuro
- Kwiaty zła
- Lato, którego nie znałam z tobą
- Losy innego świata zależą od korposzczura
- Magi: Labyrinth of Magic
- Magic Knight Rayearth
- Make the Exorcist Fall in Love
- Marriagetoxin
- Miasto wieczornego spokoju, kraj kwitnącej wiśni
- Miecz Zabójcy Demonów
- Miecz Zabójcy Demonów: Gaiden
- Mistrz romansu Nozaki
- Moriarty
- Moriarty - The Remains
- Murciélago
- My Hero Academia
- My Hero Academia: Team-Up Missions
- Na kocią łapę
- Nagahama To Be, or Not To Be
- Nasz cud
- Nawet jeśli rozetniesz mi usta...
- Niebieskie pudełko
- Nina z Gwieździstego Królestwa
- Nisekoi
- Odrodzona jako czarny charakter w grze otome
- Orient
- Ostatni elf
- Pensjonat w zaświatach
- Plunderer
- Podróż Nicoli przez Świat Demonów
- Podróżując pod księżycem przez inny świat
- Podziemne Tokio
- Posępny Mononokean
- Pożegnanie pierwszej miłości
- Pragnę śmierci z twoich pięknych rąk
- Przebijający niebiosa Gurren Lagann
- Przyjacielskie rozgrywki
- Psycho-Pass 2
- Psy na mangę
- Przytulny dom Chi
- QQ Sweeper
- Re:Zero – Życie w innym świecie od zera
- ReLIFE
- Requiem Króla Róż
- Ruri Dragon
- Saint Seiya
- Saint Seiya - Edycja Specjalna
- Sąsiedzka opowieść
- Seraph of the End
- Sekret Panny Watanuki
- Shadows House
- Shiki
- Shinigami Doggy
- Shino i Ren
- Siedmiu książąt i tysiącletni labirynt
- Spy × Family
- StageS
- Starszy Pan i kot
- Starving Anonymous
- Strażnik domu Momochi
- Summer Time Rendering
- Summer Wars
- Sunny
- Switched
- Szkolne życie!
- Talentless Nana
- Tank Chair
- Tatsuki Fujimoto – Zbiór opowiadań
- Tekkon Kinkreet
- The Promised Neverland
- Therapy Game
- Tokyo Ghoul:re
- Tokyo Revengers
- Tokyo Revengers – List od Keisuke Bajiego
- Tokyo Revengers: So Young + Stay Gold
- Tomodachi Game
- Übel Blatt
- Übel Blatt - Edycja specjalna
- Walking Cat
- Walkirie kresu dziejów - Record of Ragnarok
- Vigilante: My Hero Academia Illegals
- W zakątku tego świata
- Wiedźma z jurty
- Wiedźma z Zamku Ostów
- Wilcze dzieci
- Wilczyca i Czarny Książę
- Wrobiona w magię
- Wyroki Marii
- Złudne niebo
- Your Forma
- Yuri to moja praca
- Zapach Miłości
- Zbudź się, śpiąca królewno
- Ziemia i jej obroty
- Ziemia i jej obroty - Edycja Specjalna
- Z nieśmiałej panny w brzydką kotkę
- Złoty baran
- Żegnaj, Odynie
- Re: Zero - Wiedźma Chciwości
- Żaden ze mnie anioł

=== Other ===
- Baśnie japońskie (lit. Japanese Fable)
- Jak powstaje manga? (Polish version of How to Draw Manga)
- Kana na wesoło (lit. Kana for Merriment)
- „Mangamix” - periodical
- Ptaszek, dzwonek i ja: dzieła wybrane Misuzu Kaneko (lit. Bird, Bell and I: assembly work of Misuzu Kaneko)
- Świat z papieru i stali: okruchy Japonii (lit. Word out of paper and steel: Japan's crumb)
- The New Generation of Manga Artist - artbook
