= Patrick Moriarty =

Patrick Moriarty may refer to:

- Patrick E. Moriarty (1805–1875), Irish priest
- P. J. Moriarty (circa 1908 – 1977), American restaurateur
- Paddy Moriarty (active 1972–1977), Gaelic football player
- Pat Moriarty (American football) (born 1955), a football executive
