= John McNulty (journalist) =

American journalist

John Augustine McNulty (1895–1956) was an American journalist and writer. McNulty is a major figure in the development of the genre of literary journalism.

== Contribution to development of genre of literary journalism ==
It is the University of Massachusetts Amherst’s Prof. Sims who credits Joseph Mitchell, John McNulty and other short piece writers at Harold Ross’ designedly succoring The New Yorker magazine with evolving an early 20th-century reformer news writer's practice into a separate literary genre.

In his seminal work Literary Journalism in the 20th Century, Norman Sims traces the roots of literary journalism to journalist reformers efforts to make their news reports so poignant as to compel others to undertake corrective social actions. The later genre of literary journalism, as stated by Sim's to have been evolved by McNulty and other short piece writers at the New Yorker magazine, is no longer conflicted between unbiased fact reporting and the enhanced portrayal of social conditions for some form of advocacy but, concentrates upon such latter portrayal, while using actual events as a creative substrate. Literary journalism does, however, still demand accurate fact reporting of its practitioners. McNulty's words are near unrivaled, at evoking in their readers’ minds, such poignant imagery, and in their readers’ hearts, such concern and affection for his very common characters.

== Early life, education and career ==
John McNulty was born in Lawrence, Massachusetts, in 1895. John's father died during John's early childhood. He was raised by his mother, who operated a small store to support her family. John McNulty served as a noncommissioned officer in the U.S. infantry in France during World War I. McNulty fought in several of the war's major battles. In 1918 at the Second Battle of the Marne, the decisive Allied victory that lead to the Central Powers’ capitulation and the end of World War I within 100 days, McNulty suffered a massive wound to his leg that left him with a severe limp for the rest of his life. No other noncommissioned officer in John’s company survived the war.

After recouping from his injury for more than a year, John attended the Columbia School of Journalism while working for the Associated Press. After graduating from Columbia University, John went to work as a reporter for the New York Post. He subsequently worked as a reporter in chronological order for the Ohio State Journal, New York Daily Mirror, New York Daily News, and as a staff writer at Time (magazine), before joining his close friend James Thurber at The New Yorker magazine in 1937, where McNulty remained until his death from a heart attack in 1956.

== Notoriety and legacy ==
The success of J. A. McNulty’s 1941 short story "Atheist Hit By A Truck" catapulted him into the national spotlight and cemented his reputation and further career path as an author rather than a journalist.

John's wife, Faith McNulty, was an author and children's book writer known for penning The Burning Bed, which was eventually turned into a 1984 film featuring Farrah Fawcett.

McNulty's great-grandnephew Matt McNulty also worked as a reporter for the New York Post, much like John did in the early 1930s before writing for The New Yorker.

== Literary works and close friendship with Thurber ==
Many of John McNulty's stories deal with New York saloon life and its characters. McNulty was a lifelong friend, associate, and drinking companion of writer and humorist James Thurber, who McNulty had early mentored while in Ohio. McNulty wrote at The New Yorker with Thurber, Joseph Mitchell, S. J. Perelman, E. B. White and others. They met at Costello's saloon on Third Avenue in New York City as members of the "square table" (in contrast with the literary wits who met at the Algonquin Round Table). Thurber eulogized McNulty in the New Yorker and wrote a long and extraordinarily affectionate foreword to (The World of John McNulty) the earliest posthumous collection of his friend's stories. According to Thurber, The New Yorker published more than sixty pieces by McNulty.

McNulty's works have been used in graduate literature courses at Columbia, Duke and University of Pittsburgh. McNulty's stories are collected in The World of John McNulty (1957) and This Place on Third Avenue (2001). "The World of John McNulty" (TWJM) collects 55 pieces; 13 of 17 from McNulty's book "3rd Avenue, New York" (TANY); 11 of 12 from his book "A Man Gets Around"(AMGA); 12 of 25 from his book "My Son Johnny" (MSJ); and 19 previously uncollected pieces. "This Place on Third Avenue" collects 28 pieces (7 of which do not appear in TWJM); 15 from TANY; 2 from AMGA; none from MSJ; 7 collected in TWJM; 2 previously uncollected; and 2 previously unpublished.

James Thurber, McNulty's close friend, wrote that "Nothing, however, commonplace, that he touched remained commonplace but, was magnified and enlivened by his intense and endless fascination with the stranger in the street, the drinker in the bar, and the bartender behind it, the horseplayer, the cab driver, the guy at the ballgame, the fellow across the room, the patient in the next hospital bed."

== Books ==
- Third Avenue New York (1946), Boston, Little Brown
- A Man Gets Around (1951), Boston, Little Brown
- My Son Johnny (1955), Simon and Schuster
- The World of John McNulty (1957), NY, Doubleday
- This Place on Third Avenue (2001), Washington, D.C., Counterpoint
