= Owen O'Moriarty =

Gaelic Irish warrior

Owen O'Moriarty (Irish:Eoin Ó Muircheartaigh) was a Gaelic Irish warrior and chieftain notable for his part in the final stages of the Desmond Rebellion and the death of Gerald FitzGerald, 15th Earl of Desmond in 1583.

The Moriartys are a Gaelic clan who inhabited the middle and west of Kerry. The head of the clan in 1583 was Owen O'Moriarty, also known as Owen McDonnell Moriarty. The Moriartys' property at one time stretched from Loch Lein to the Blasket Islands and they were direct descendants of the Eoghanacht. The clan's principal castle was at Castledrum near Castlemaine, County Kerry.

Following a series of defeats in the Desmond Rebellion and a sustained campaign against his forces, the Earl of Desmond had gone into hiding in western Kerry. In November 1583 a raiding party of Desmond's men attacked a kinsman of the O'Moriartys, stealing their cattle and robbing women and children and stripping them naked.

Owen Moriarty sought assistance from a local Royal commander, Sir William Stanley, to take revenge and recover the cattle. Accompanied by several government soldiers, a party of his own warriors led by Owen pursued Desmond into the Slieve Mish Mountains. They discovered the Earl sheltering without any guards in a cabin. O'Moriarty attempted to take Desmond prisoner, seizing him and arresting him in the name of the Queen and the Lord General Ormond. Fearing that some of Desmond's men were approaching, they cut off the Earl's head and abandoned the remainder of his body. The reward paid out for Desmond's head by the government was a thousand pounds. Owen Moriarty's account of the incident is still retained in the state papers.

Owen’s grandchildren came to prominence in the 1640’s and 1650’s when Donal was chieftain of Castledrum and Dermot was chieftain of Annascaul. A granddaughter Mary was married to the Gaelic poet, chieftain and soldier Piaras Ferriter. All were involved in the siege of Tralee. Two grandsons were Dominican priests including Fr Thomas and Fr Thaddeus who was the Prior of Holy Cross in Tralee. Fr Thaddeus was martyred in Killarney in 1653. A silver chalice used by Fr Thaddeus is still in the possession of the Dominican community in Tralee.

In 1652 during the Cromwellian wars Castledrum was destroyed by parliamentary forces, and one son of Donal’s family called Tadgh escaped to Ballintermon, Annascaul where there was a monastery. Here he built Ballintermon House on ancient Moriarty land. The descendants of Owen and his grandson Tadgh Moriarty still reside at Ballintermon House, Annascaul and several of the Moriarty families in Kerry today trace their ancestry to this branch. The current owner of the Moriarty land at Annascaul is John Moriarty. The Ballintermon branch of the Moriarty clan are one of the few remaining noble gaelic families to retain part of their ancestral land into the 21st century. The Annascaul branch still keeps an ancient chalice bearing the arms of Moriarty said to be made with silver given by Queen Elizabeth. In later times Owen's descendants Thaddeus (Thady) Moriarty (b.1774) and his son Timothy (b.1824) of Ballintermon were hereditary Seneschals or Barony Constables of Corca Dhuibhne as well as being the heads of the family. The current owner John Moriarty is a great great grandson of Timothy Moriarty. It is not known if there is any close connection between this branch to the famous philosopher John Moriarty.

== Bibliography ==
- Berleth, Richard J. The Twilight Lords: Elizabeth I and the Plunder of Ireland. Rowman & Littlefield, 2002.
- Falls, Cyril. Elizabeth's Irish Wars. Constable and Company, 1996.
