= Sons & Daughters (restaurant) =

Restaurant in Nob Hill, San Francisco

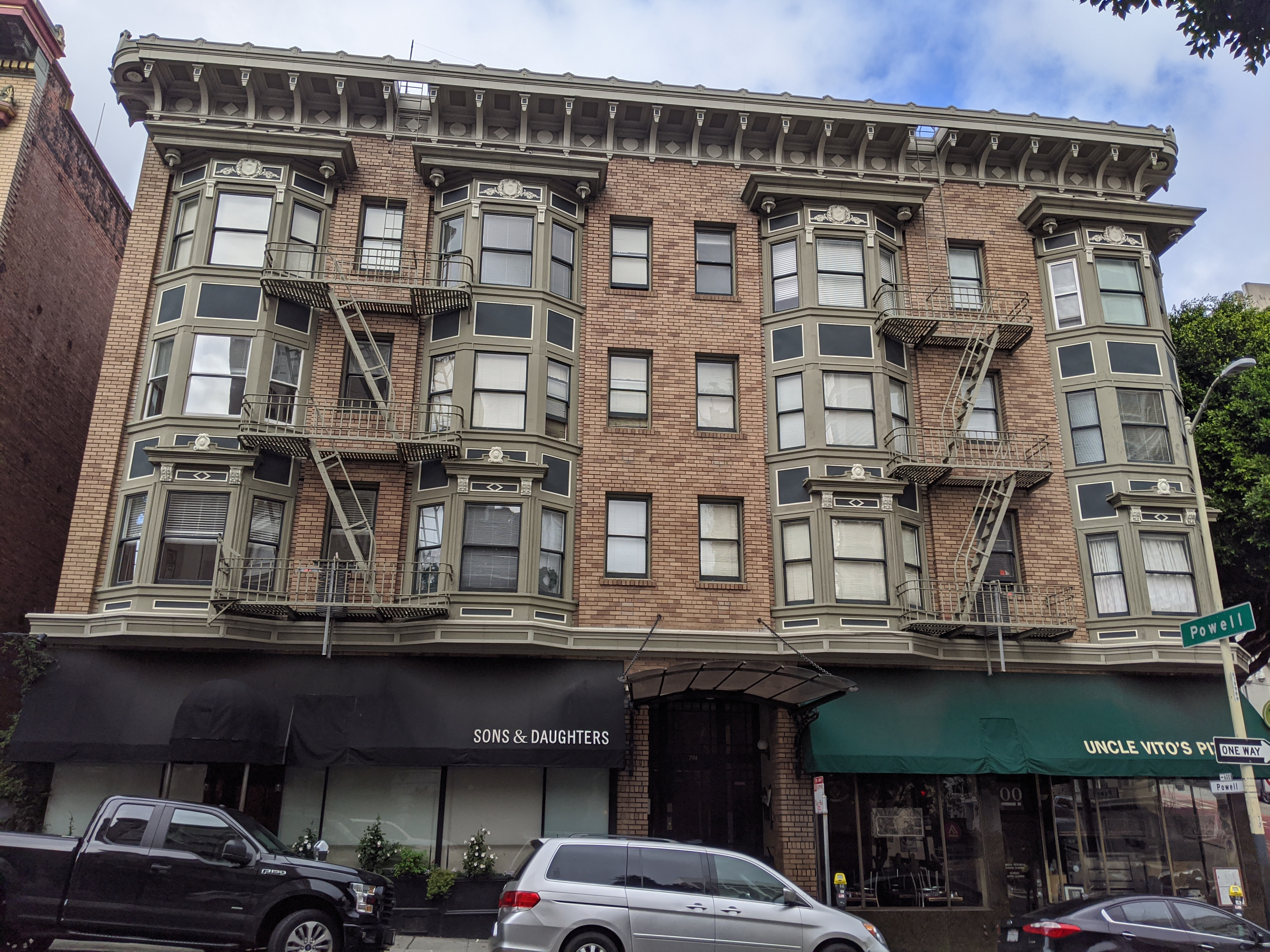
- Sons & Daughters' original location (left)
- Interactive map of Sons & Daughters

Restaurant information
- Established: 2010
- Owners: Teague Moriarty, Harrison Cheney
- Head chef: Harrison Cheney
- Food type: New American, New Nordic
- Rating: (Michelin Guide)
- Location: 2875 18th Street, San Francisco, California, 94110, United States
- Coordinates: 37°45′42″N 122°24′39″W
- Website: www.sonsanddaughterssf.com

Sons & Daughters is a New Nordic restaurant in San Francisco, California, United States. It opened in 2010 and has two Michelin stars.

== History ==
The restaurant was opened in June 2010 by chefs Teague Moriarty and Matt McNamara with Travis Curtis in the "TenderNob" area of Nob Hill on the edge of the Tenderloin. It replaced Cafe Mozart, a longstanding restaurant, and was named for its young staff. Its cuisine was Northern California New American with an emphasis on locally sourced seasonal ingredients.

After the COVID-19 shutdown, Moriarty, then sole owner and chef, reopened Sons & Daughters with fewer tables and a smaller staff, all salaried. In 2022 he was joined as chef by Harrison Cheney, who became head chef in 2023 and changed the cuisine to New Nordic.

Cheney subsequently became co-owner of Sons & Daughters with Moriarty. In 2025, they relocated the restaurant to the former site of Osito in the Mission District, which has more space both for diners and in the kitchen. Capacity was expanded to 10 tables and a private dining room seating 12, and diners initially convene in a lounge and bar area. Cheney created abstract art to add to the black and white photographs in the dining room. The tasting menu was expanded from 20 to 24 courses.

== Associated restaurants ==
Moriarty and McNamara opened two casual spin-off restaurants, both of which have closed: Sweet Woodruff, opened in January 2012 in Nob Hill and closed in March 2016, and The Square, opened in February 2014 in the former space of Washington Square Bar and Grill in North Beach and closed in 2017.

== Awards and honors ==
Sons & Daughters was first awarded a Michelin star in the 2012 Guide. In 2024, under Cheney, it was awarded a second star.

The San Francisco Chronicle named Moriarty and McNamara 2012 Rising Star Chefs; Michelin gave Cheney its 2023 Young Chef Award for California.

== See also ==
- List of Michelin-starred restaurants in California
- List of New American restaurants
