= Michael Moriarty (disambiguation) =

Michael Moriarty (born 1941) is an American-Canadian actor.

Michael Moriarty is also the name of:

- Michael Moriarty (judge) (born 1946), Irish judge who chaired the Moriarty Tribunal into payment to politicians Charles Haughey and Michael Lowry
- Michael Moriarty (historian), British historian
- Michael Moriarty (politician), South African politician from Gauteng
- Michael Moriarty (author) (born 1954), General Secretary of Education and Training Boards Ireland
- Mick Moriarty, Australian musician
- Mike Moriarty (born 1974), baseball player
- Mícheál Ó Muircheartaigh (born 1930), Irish broadcaster, born Michael Moriarty
