= James Moriarty =

James Moriarty may refer to:

== People ==
- James Moriarty (bishop) (1936–2022), Bishop Emeritus of the Roman Catholic Diocese of Kildare and Leighlin
- James Moriarty (cyclist) (born 2001), Australian road and track cyclist
- James F. Moriarty (born 1953), United States diplomat and career foreign service officer
- James F. Moriarty (USMC) (1896–1981), United States Marine Corps general
- James R. Moriarty (born 1946), American lawyer noted for mass torts against major corporations
- Jim Moriarty (born 1953), New Zealand actor
- Jim Moriarty (luger) (born 1941), American Olympic luger

== Characters ==
- Count Jim Moriarty, fictional character from the 1950s BBC Radio comedy The Goon Show
- Professor Moriarty, fictional character and the archenemy of the detective Sherlock Holmes
