= Neary's =

Irish pub in New York City, 1967 to 2024

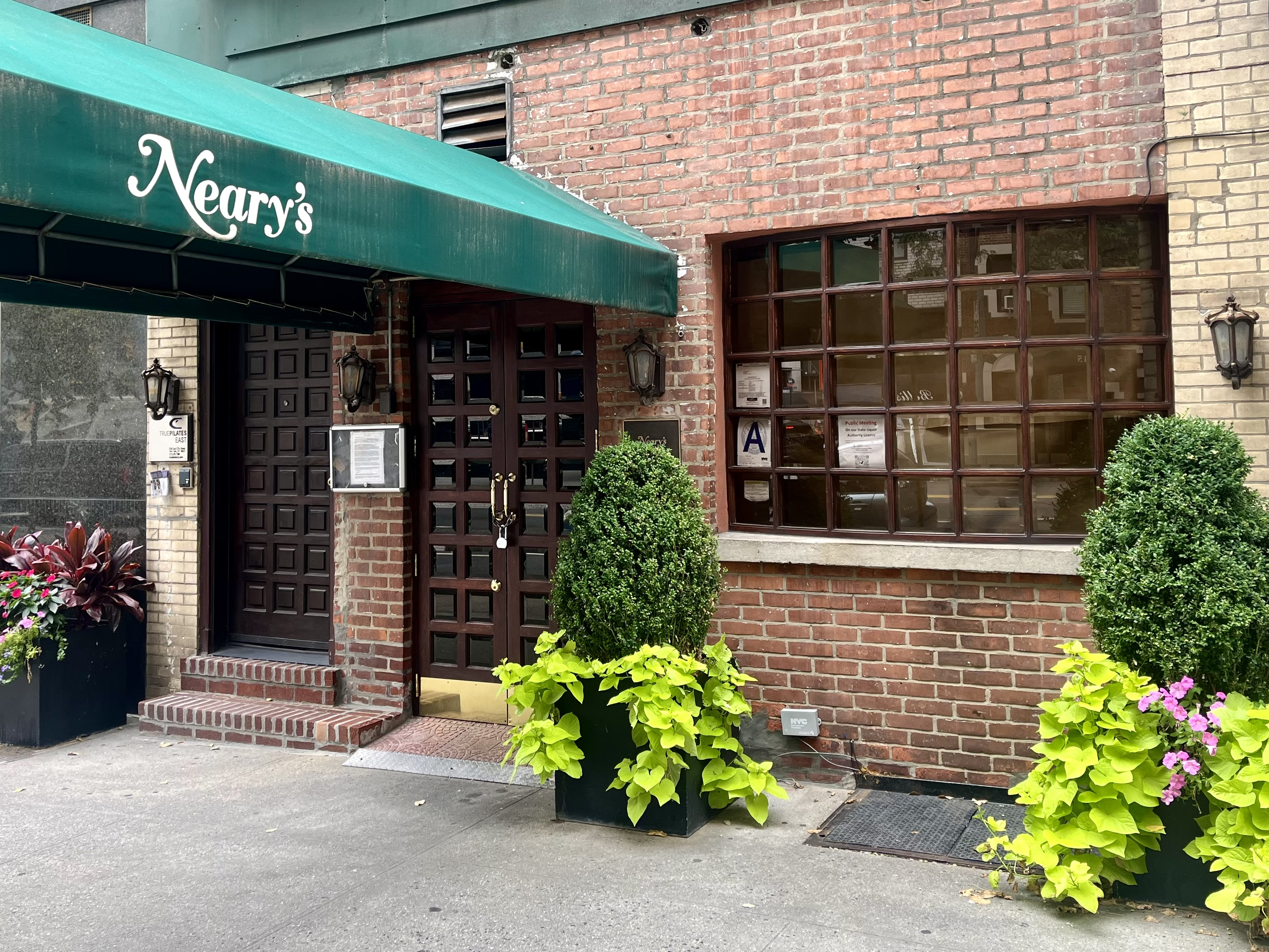
- The restaurant's exterior in July 2024, after its closure
- Interactive map of Neary's

Restaurant information
- Established: March 16, 1967
- Closed: July 19, 2024
- Previous owners: Jimmy Neary; The Neary family
- Location: 358 East 57th Street, New York, New York, 10022, United States
- Coordinates: 40°45′30″N 73°57′49″W
- Website: www.nearys.com

Neary's was an Irish pub on East 57th Street near First Avenue in Midtown Manhattan, New York City, from 1967 to 2024. It was founded in 1967 by Jimmy Neary (September 14, 1930 – October 1, 2021), an Irish emigrant who had worked in New York City establishments and served in the United States Army. Neary's was known for its traditional menu and its elite clientele, including political figures, prominent businesspeople, writers, and entertainers. Neary died in 2021 and his children continued to operate the pub until its closure in 2024.

== Early years ==
Neary's was founded by James Joseph "Jimmy" Neary, an Irish emigrant to the United States. Jimmy Neary was born on September 14, 1930, in Tubbercurry, Ireland. Neary emigrated to the United States at the age of 24; he bought his boat ticket by buying lambs from gambling winnings, and then breeding and selling them. When he first moved to New York City, he worked as a porter at the New York Athletic Club. He was then drafted into the United States Army and served in Germany. When he returned he worked as a bartender at P. J. Moriarty's until he opened his own pub. In 1966, he married his wife Eileen Twomey. On Saint Patrick's Day, March 16, 1967, Jimmy opened his eponymous pub with Brian Mulligan, who was also a bartender, at 358 East 57th Street. In 1986, Jimmy purchased the building.

== Reputation and atmosphere ==
Neary's was described as an upscale establishment. Jimmy Neary required male customers to wear jackets and barred t-shirts and shorts. The bar had a traditional pub menu. Its most popular items were lamb chops with mint jelly and corned beef and cabbage.

The pub was best known for its notable regulars, including political figures, prominent businesspeople, writers, and entertainers. Customers were drawn by Jimmy Neary's work ethic and personality, as well as the pub's long-time bartenders and waiters, including Jimmy's daughter Una Neary, who worked at the pub for most of her life and continued working there even after becoming a partner at Goldman Sachs. The pseudonymous food critic Brooks of Sheffield, writing for Eater, called Neary a "faithful and attentive owner". Neary worked every day of the year except for Christmas Day, when he closed the restaurant. Jimmy was short in stature, and many customers referred to him as their "favorite leprechaun". The New York Times wrote that Jimmy's "hospitality made everyone feel like a regular".

== Death of Jimmy Neary and closing ==
Jimmy Neary died on October 1, 2021 (aged 91). The Archbishop of New York, Cardinal Timothy M. Dolan, presided over his funeral at St. Patrick's Cathedral. The New York City Police Department shut down the FDR Drive, the Harlem River Drive, and the top level of the George Washington Bridge for his funeral procession. Jimmy's children operated the restaurant until July 19, 2024. Prior to closing, they announced that they had sold the building to the restaurateurs Thomas and Anthony Martignetti, who planned to open an updated Irish restaurant. The Martignettis later changed their minds and leased the space to the chef Ed Cotton and his two partners. Cotton and his partners planned to open a tavern-style eatery called the Derby Club in September 2025. They said that the restaurant would retain the same floor plan as Neary's, including the location of the bar near the entrance.

== Notable regulars ==
- Roger Ailes, American television executive
- Michael Bloomberg, former mayor of New York City and businessperson
- Bill Bratton, former New York City police commissioner
- Jimmy Breslin, American journalist and writer
- Hugh Carey, former governor of New York
- Mary Higgins Clark, American mystery writer
- Timothy M. Dolan, Archbishop of New York
- Kathie Lee Gifford, American television presenter
- John Glenn, American astronaut
- Raymond Kelly, former New York City police commissioner
- Ed Koch, former mayor of New York City
- Tim Mara, founding owner of the New York Giants
- Maureen O'Hara, American actress and singer
- George Steinbrenner, former owner of the New York Yankees
- Gay Talese, American journalist and writer

Source: The New York Times (unless otherwise noted)

== See also ==
- List of Irish restaurants
