= Paul Moriarty =

Paul Moriarty may refer to:

- Paul D. Moriarty (born 1956), American politician from New Jersey
- Paul F. X. Moriarty, American politician from Massachusetts
- Paul Moriarty (rugby) (born 1964), Welsh rugby union and rugby league footballer
- Paul Moriarty (actor) (born 1946), British actor
