= Black Torch =

Japanese manga series and its adaptation(s)

- First tankōbon volume cover, featuring Jiro Azuma (front) and Rago (back)
- Genre: Action; Science fiction; Supernatural
- Manga
- Written by: Tsuyoshi Takaki
- Published by: Shueisha
- English publisher: NA: Viz Media
- Imprint: Jump Comics SQ.
- Magazine: Jump Square (2016–18); Shōnen Jump+ (2018)
- Original run: December 31, 2016 – July 11, 2018
- Volumes: 5
- Anime television series
- Directed by: Kei Umabiki
- Written by: Gigaemon Ichikawa
- Music by: Yutaka Yamada
- Studio: 100studio
- Licensed by: Viz Media; SA/SEA: Muse Communication
- Original network: Tokyo MX, SUN, TVA, RKB, HTB, BS11
- Original run: July 4, 2026 – September 19, 2026
- Episodes: 12
- icon

Black Torch (stylized in all caps) is a Japanese manga series written and illustrated by Tsuyoshi Takaki. It was serialized in Shueisha's monthly shōnen manga magazine Jump Square from December 2016 to March 2018, and later on the digital platform Shōnen Jump+ from April to July 2018. Its chapters were collected in five tankōbon volumes. In North America, the manga was licensed for English release by Viz Media. An anime television series adaptation produced by 100studio aired from July to September 2026.

== Plot ==
Jiro Azuma is a teenage punk, trained in the art of the ninja, who has the incredible ability to talk to animals. Despite this, he was constantly bullied as a child for talking to animals; he could only find solace with other animals, such as his dog Nachi. One day, Jiro is led into the woods by some birds and encounters a gravely injured cat. He nurses the cat back to health, who is shocked to find out that Jiro can understand him. The cat reveals himself as Rago of the Black Star of Doom, an immortal mononoke, or evil spirit. He reveals that he was attacked by other mononoke for refusing to help them. Later that night, Rago attempts to escape from Jiro's house, but they are attacked by one of the mononoke Rago encountered earlier. This mononoke kills Jiro by stabbing him through the chest with his immense claws. Feeling pity and indebted to Jiro for saving him earlier, Rago fuses with Jiro to give him a second chance at life. With their combined power, they kill the mononoke, but are then taken into custody by the Bureau of Espionage. The two later join the Bureau in order to stop more mononoke in the future.

== Characters ==
Jiro Azuma (我妻 弐郎, Azuma Jirō)
Voiced by: Ryōta Suzuki (Japanese); A.J. Beckles (English)
Rago (羅睺, Ragō)
Voiced by: Yōji Ueda (Japanese); Keith Silverstein (English)
Ichika Kishimojin (鬼子母神 一華, Kishimojin Ichika)
Voiced by: Sayaka Senbongi (Japanese); Erin Yvette (English)
Reiji Kirihara (桐原 零司, Kirihara Reiji)
Voiced by: Junya Enoki (Japanese); Kyle McCarley (English)
Hana Usami (宇佐美 花, Usami Hana)
Voiced by: Reina Ueda (Japanese); Julie Nathanson (English)
Ryosuke Shiba (司場 涼介, Shiba Ryōsuke)
Voiced by: Junichi Suwabe (Japanese); Ryan Colt Levy (English)
Koga (咬牙)
Voiced by: Nobuhiko Okamoto (Japanese); Luis Bermudez (English)
Amagi (天鬼)
Voiced by: Toshiyuki Morikawa (Japanese); Ben Diskin (English)
Toshimasa Azuma (我妻 寿正, Azuma Toshimasa)
Voiced by: Shinpachi Tsuji (Japanese); Ben Balmaceda (English)
Toko Kusumi (久澄 陶子, Kusumi Toko)
Voiced by: Yūko Kaida (Japanese); Laura Post (English)
Banjuro Tokieda (時枝 蛮十郎, Tokieda Banjuro)
Voiced by: Hōchū Ōtsuka (Japanese); Mick Lauer (English)

== Media ==
=== Manga ===
Written and illustrated by Tsuyoshi Takaki, Black Torch was serialized in Shueisha's monthly shōnen manga magazine Jump Square from December 31, 2016, to March 2, 2018. It was then transferred to Shueisha's Shōnen Jump+ online platform, being serialized for four chapters from April 11 to July 11, 2018. Shueisha published its 19 individual chapters in five tankōbon volumes, released from April 4, 2017, to August 3, 2018.

In North America, Viz Media announced that it had licensed the series for English release in North America in July 2017. The title became available on its Shonen Jump digital platform in December 2018. The five volumes were released from August 7, 2018, to August 6, 2019.

==== Volumes ====
No.	Original release date	Original ISBN	English release date	English ISBN
1	April 4, 2017	978-4-08-881097-3	August 7, 2018	978-1-9747-0046-2
2	August 4, 2017	978-4-08-881139-0	November 6, 2018	978-1-9747-0152-0
3	December 4, 2017	978-4-08-881291-5	February 5, 2019	978-1-9747-0222-0
4	April 4, 2018	978-4-08-881391-2	May 7, 2019	978-1-9747-0457-6
5	August 3, 2018	978-4-08-881541-1	August 6, 2019	978-1-9747-0744-7

=== Anime ===
In March 2025, at Emerald City Comic Con, it was announced that the manga would receive an anime television series adaptation. The anime is produced by 100studio and directed by Kei Umabiki, with series composition and screenplays by Gigaemon Ichikawa, character designs by Gō Suzuki, and music composed by Yutaka Yamada. It aired from July 4 to September 19, 2026, on Tokyo MX and other networks. The opening theme song is "Freeze Me Up", performed by SiM, and the ending theme song is "Groooovy", performed by I Don't Like Mondays.

Viz Media, the company that made the adaptation announcement, has licensed the series. Crunchyroll is streaming the series. Muse Communication licensed the series in South and Southeast Asia.

==== Episodes ====
No.	Title	Directed by (Note: Production staff information is taken from the ending credits of each episode.)	Written by	Storyboarded by	Original release date
1	"The Future Is in Our Hands"; Transliteration: "Mirai wa Oretō no Te no Naka" (Japanese: 未来は俺等の手の中)	Ryūhei Aoyagi	Keīchirō Ōchi & Gigaemon Ichikawa	Ryūhei Aoyagi	July 4, 2026
Jiro Azuma, who has the ability to speak with animals, defeats three delinquents who were bullying a stray cat. After returning home, Jiro's grandfather Toshimasa Azuma scolds him for picking another fight. Afterwards, a crow alerts Jiro towards a seriously wounded black cat, who is actually a mononoke, an immortal evil spirit, named Rago. Jiro takes Rago home and Rago explains that he is being hunted by another mononoke. Meanwhile, Ichika Kishimojin, an agent from the Bureau of Espionage tasked with eliminating mononoke, is out to hunt Rago having traced his scent to where he was picked up. That night, Rago attempts to escape, but Jiro wakes up and the two encounter the mononoke who is after Rago. Jiro comes in to help Rago fight the mononoke, but gets mortally wounded. To repay the favor for saving him, Rago fuses with Jiro to revive him, and Jiro defeats the mononoke with his new power. After the battle, Jiro is detained by the Bureau led by Ryosuke Shiba and is taken into custody.
2	"The Choice Is Yours"	Soung-choel Ko	Gigaemon Ichikawa	Ryūhei Aoyagi	July 11, 2026
The next day, Jiro awakens at a hospital under the Bureau's jurisdiction greeted by Ichika and the two immediately argue with each other. Shiba walks in and explains how the Bureau came to be and their mission to destroy mononoke who threaten humankind. Shiba has Jiro taken in for protection because he is fused with a mononoke. After Jiro is left alone, he breaks out of the hospital with assistance from wild crows that he orders to attack the security guards. Jiro returns to his home but is ambushed by Toshimasa, who takes him to a nearby park to have a sparring match. As the two fight, Toshimasa reveals that he heard everything from Shiba and that he is a former Bureau agent. During the fight, Toshimasa criticizes Jiro for lacking resolve and being only half a man. However, Jiro shows his renewed determination and his unwillingness to back down. The fight ends with Toshimasa admitting defeat and allows Jiro to choose his own path but is still critical his decision. That night, Toshimasa asks Shiba to pick him up the next day.
3	"WHAT'S MY NAME?"	Yi Wang	Hideaki Shirasaka	Kei Umabiki & Hiroshi Hara	July 18, 2026
Jiro moves out of his grandfather's home to be escorted into captivity handcuffed in an armored truck. However, on the way the drivers are killed by a pair of mononoke. Ichika goes out to fight the mononoke alone and Jiro escapes the truck as it gets destroyed by the mononoke. Ichika reveals that she comes from a ninja clan led by her father and her mother was killed by a mononoke, motivating her to succeed her father as the clan's head. Struggling in her battle against the pair, Jiro convinces Ichika to uncuff him, and together, Jiro and Ichika defeat the mononoke with the two properly introducing themselves after the fight. Meanwhile, Shiba decides to recruit Jiro and form a new squad called Black Torch consisting of Shiba, Jiro, Ichika, Shiba's assistant Hana Usami, and the new recruit Reiji Kirihara with the council's approval. Afterwards, the members of Black Torch meet up for the first time at a warehouse. Shiba has Jiro spar with Reiji to assess his abilities, telling Jiro that he needs to prove his worth to be accepted into Black Torch.
4	"Two Is Not Enough"	Yoshihide Ibata	Kōki Hashimoto	Ryūhei Aoyagi	July 25, 2026
Reiji shows off his sensing ability after allowing Jiro to attack him with his eyes closed. However, Jiro shows his resiliency and breaks Reiji's wooden sword to land a punch. The two then knock each other out in a fist fight. Afterwards, Jiro and Reiji are outfitted with their new uniforms with Shiba teaching him how to change between combat, quantum camouflage, and stealth modes. Shiba gives Black Torch their first mission at a shrine. There, while Black Torch meets the client, Jiro notices a suspicious person outside. The client escorts Black Torch underground to the Seventh Sealed Sanctum where Rago was sealed to investigate the scene. Shiba and Ichika return to the surface, while Reiji asks Rago about what happened when he was released from the rock. Rago only recalls that he was being persuaded to join a group to take the Bureau down but refused. From this, Reiji concludes that the group is out to get revenge on mankind and the Bureau. A mononoke suddenly enters the sanctum and picks a fight with Jiro and Reiji, while outside the shrine Shiba and Ichika are approached by the Special Operations Division 1 (SOD-1) chief Toko Kusumi.
5	"Young Gunz"	Yasutoshi Iwasaki & Hitoshi Motoi	Kōki Hashimoto	TYUTYU, Kiyoshi Okuyama & Mayuko Matsui	August 1, 2026
The mononoke, Koga, explains that he wants to rule the mononoke and needs Rago's power. Rago refuses, and Reiji attacks Koga, but only manages to wound his arm. Koga breaks Reiji's sword and knocks him out. Jiro fights back and combines his energy with Rago's to launch a powerful attack at Koga that breaks his sword. Impressed by the attack, Koga becomes even more determined to take Rago for himself as he takes his leave. As Ichika comes to get Jiro and Reiji, Shiba tells Kusumi that he will take responsibility for this unauthorized mission as she departs. The next day, Shiba holds a training session for Black Torch, bringing in his mononoke partner Fuyo to lead it. Jiro, Ichika, and Reiji are tasked with breaking free from Fuyo's hallucinations. Reiji has a sword fight with his older brother Shinji Kirihara in his hallucination. Meanwhile, Ichika recalls the final time she saw her mother and later discovered that her mother is still alive but is immobilized due to a mononoke's curse. Jiro keeps running and encounters a mononoke and prepares to fight it.
6	"Turn Up"	Yūdai Ishikawa	Hideaki Shirasaka	TYUTYU, Chihiro Nitta & Mizuki Nagara	August 8, 2026
Reiji remembers that he was tight with Shinji and supported his brother in becoming the family heir knowing that Shinji's swordsmanship far exceeded his own. But during the Rite of the Sword, Shinji gets possessed by the cursed sword, Hell Tempest. Shinji departed with a message to Reiji to get stronger after killing the guards. Reiji breaks free of his hallucination after defeating the shadow Shinji, while Ichika also breaks free within ten minutes. Meanwhile, Fuyo loses control of Jiro's hallucinations that puts him in a perilous situation. Jiro sees Rago's memories instead of his own, and Rago realizes that Amagi, a powerful mononoke who led an army to get revenge on the Oniwaban, an undercover mononoke extermination squad, is the one who tried to recruit him. Amagi slaughtered the shrine's inhabitants after Rago refused to join him. That caused him to transform into his true form and go berserk, destroying the shrine in the process. Rago willingly sealed himself to remain loyal to nobody. Now knowing that the beast is Rago's true form, Jiro fights back and breaks free of the hallucination.
7	"3 on Three"	Tomoaki Takatsudo	Gigaemon Ichikawa	Kei Umabiki	August 15, 2026
Shiba calls Kusumi out to report about Amagi, as well as to discuss homicides happening in Hirasaka, a town suddenly blanketed in heavy fog. Jiro, Ichika, and Reiji are deployed into Hirasaka rescue the inhabitants, disperse the fog, and capture the enemy. After entering Hirasaka, Rago detects the four mononoke responsible for the fog: Roren, Naruko, Kanawa, and a hooded man. Kanawa suddenly appears and Jiro takes him on while Ichika and Reiji split up. Ichika takes on Roren, while Reiji takes on Naruko and the hooded man. Jiro initially gains the upper hand on Kanawa, but Kanawa uses his special power to control gravity to pin Jiro down. Meanwhile, Ichika overcomes Roren's illusion after he tried to turn her into his plaything and cuts off a horn to disable his illusion. As Jiro struggles in his fight, his jacket falls off, unleashing Rago's powers that were neutralized by the jacket and dismembers Kanawa. Elsewhere, Reiji recognizes the sword the hooded man is carrying and realizes that the hooded man is Shinji.
8	"Under Dog"	Ryūhei Aoyagi	Kōki Hashimoto	Ryūhei Aoyagi	August 22, 2026
As the brothers fight, Shinji reveals that contrary to what Reiji believes, Shinji was never possessed by Hell Tempest. Shinji recalls that Reiji used to be the better swordsman, and he would be harshly reprimanded by their father every time he lost to Renji. But when Shinji surpassed him, he believes that Renji was losing on purpose to protect him from his father. As such, Shinji killed their father and sided with the mononoke hoping to fight against Reiji's true strength. Shinji wounds Reiji and walks away as the fog disperses. Meanwhile, Jiro encounters Amagi for the first time and gets knocked out, while Naruko and Koga arrive shortly after. With Amagi threatening to kill Jiro, Rago agrees to submit to Amagi in exchange for Jiro's life. As the separation process finishes, SOD-1 agents Takeru Inui and Banri Himetsuka attack Amagi and his henchmen, forcing them to retreat with Rago. As Amagi prepares to fuse with Rago and absorb his powers he believes is the key to getting revenge on humanity, Amagi realizes that Rago tricked him as Rago left his powers with Jiro.
9	"One"	Soung-cheol Ko	Hideaki Shirasaka	TYUTYU, Chihiro Nitta & Mizuki Nagara	August 29, 2026
Jiro awakens wearing a power-suppressing harness in the presence of SOD-1, but Jiro destroys the harness and goes berserk determined to defeat Amagi. Inui engages with Jiro to keep him occupied until Toshimasa arrives to knock him out. Afterwards, Jiro regains his sanity and admits he was not in control of himself. Elsewhere, Ichika and Hana show their support for each other in their conversation. Ichika is then asked by Shiba to interrogate Roren, who is in confinement following his defeat, for information about Amagi. Roren explains that he works for Amagi because he wanted to stand out amongst the humans. Meanwhile, Koga protects Rago from Amagi not knowing that he is powerless. Out in the forest, Toshimasa trains Jiro in a domain belonging to the mononoke Ibuki, who had formed a non-aggression pact with the Oniwaban a long time ago. Having been sent as an envoy, Fuyo returns with a warning message from Ibuki, but despite what Ibuki said, she did not mean to stay out. As such, Jiro enters Ibuki's domain.
10	"Deadly Skillz"; Transliteration: "Yabasugiru Sukiru" (Japanese: ヤバスギルスキル)	Yi Wang	Kōki Hashimoto	TYUTYU, Chihiro Nitta & Mizuki Nagara	September 5, 2026
Jiro encounters a snake mononoke and spends the night with it, then fights a scythe-wielding mononoke. As Rago's spectral power begins to consume him, the snake asks Jiro what Rago means to him. Jiro realizes that the key to controlling the power is to view himself and Rago as equals. Jiro brings the power under control and faints. After Jiro awakens the next day, he is greeted by Ibuki, the snake he met who transformed into a woman, and Monjumaru, the scythe-wielding mononoke and Ibuki's husband who was born a human. While Jiro trains with Monjumaru to learn how to control his powers, Ibuki tells him about Amagi and how she refused to join his mononoke army. Ibuki explains that Amagi can absorb a mononoke's power by consuming them and has since become obsessed with power. Meanwhile, Amagi consumes Naruko to absorb her power, causing Koga to snap. Koga takes his leave and betrays Amagi. Back in the forest, Roren is escorted there by Ichika and SOD-1. After a day of training, Ibuki and Monjumaru carry Jiro back to where Shiba, Fuyo, and Toshimasa are.
11	"Black or White"	Yoshihide Ibata	Gigaemon Ichikawa	TYUTYU, Kiyoshi Okuyama & Mayuko Matsui	September 12, 2026
Amagi tells Rago his life's story as in his first moments of life, he became a village god after saving a woman from a mononoke, entrusted with protecting the village. However, one night the village was decimated by an organized attack by neighboring villages. Having been defeated in battle, he consumed that woman he saved as a sacrifice and from there, he became obsessed with power. Back in the forest, Ibuki warns Jiro that he can only use Rago's powers at its fullest for ten minutes. Jiro wakes up and declares his commitment to defeat Amagi to save Rago. As Jiro returns to the Bureau's base with Roren providing assistance, a gateway to Amagi's realm appears in the bay that sends a swarm of mononoke insects to attack the base. As the soldiers fight the monsters, Jiro, Ichika, and Reiji charge towards the gate with Koga helping Jiro out. Jiro enters Amagi's realm and taps into Rago's power to fight Amagi and deliver the first hit.
12	"Once Again"	Kei Umabiki	Gigaemon Ichikawa	TYUTYU, Kiyoshi Okuyama & Mayuko Matsui	September 19, 2026

== Reception ==
In 2019, Black Torch was one of manga titles that ranked on the "Top 10 Graphic Novels for Teens" by the Young Adult Library Services Association (YALSA) of the American Library Association.

Rebecca Silverman of Anime News Network gave the first volume a B, praising the character dynamics and story devices, but criticized its rushed start and lack of character development. She noted that Takaki's art style resembles that of Tite Kubo (Bleach) and other Weekly Shōnen Jump authors, but without being an imitation of any of them. Silverman concluded, "If you're in the mood for a new shounen action series, this is one worth checking out, because once it works out its issues, it could definitely go places".

== See also ==
- Heart Gear, another manga series by the same author
