= John Moriarty =

John Moriarty may refer to:

- John Moriarty (Attorney General) (1855–1915), Irish lawyer and judge
- John Moriarty (conductor) (1930–2022), American conductor and stage director
- John Moriarty (writer) (1938–2007), Irish writer and philosopher
- John Kundereri Moriarty (born 1938), Australian footballer and artist

== See also ==
- Geoffrey John Jack Moriarty (1901–1980), Australian rules player
- Johnny Moriarty (born 1945), Irish retired hurling goalkeeper
