= George Frazier (journalist) =

American journalist (1911–1974)

- Born: George Francis Frazier Jr. June 10, 1911
- Died: June 13, 1974 (aged 63)
- Occupation: Journalist

George Francis Frazier Jr. (June 10, 1911 – June 13, 1974) was an American journalist.

== Early life ==
Frazier was raised in South Boston, attended the Boston Latin School, and was graduated from Harvard College (where he won the Boylston Prize for Rhetoric) in 1932.

== Career ==
He wrote for the Boston newspapers and for Esquire magazine, as well as many other venues, including the New York papers. Beginning as a jazz critic, his Sweet and Low Down column, debuting in the Boston Herald on January 27, 1942, was the first regular jazz column in an American big-city daily. He soon left jazz criticism for general journalism. He concluded his career as a much-revered columnist for The Boston Globe. Called "Acidmouth" by his publishers at DownBeat, he was known for his arch style, acerbic wit, erudite Olympian pronouncements on men's fashion, and general je ne sais quoi.

Frazier wrote the song "Harvard Blues" (music by Tab Smith), recorded in 1941 by Count Basie and included on the compilation The Count Basie Story, Disc 3 – Harvard Blues (2001, Proper Records).

Thanks to his writing, Frazier earned a place on the master list of Nixon's political opponents.

=== Quotes ===
It feels like snow, he said, and it was all there, all the sadness and all the silveryness in a single sentence.

— George Frazier, 1960s column in the Boston Herald

All I'm trying to say, really, is that most boutique customers should be lined up before a firing squad at dawn and that there should be a minute of silence to thank God for the existence of people like Miles Davis.

— George Frazier, liner notes for 1965 album Miles Davis' Greatest Hits

Duende was George Frazier's favorite word. It is, of course, the precise word to describe his life and his writings: roughly translated—grace, wit and class.

— Studs Terkel

== Links to writings by Frazier ==
- "The Art of Wearing Clothes", article by George Frazier, Esquire magazine, September 1960
- "Whose Civil Rights", column by George Frazier, Boston Herald, August 30, 1963
- Sample of Frazier's jazz criticism from 1942, JazzBoston
- "Warlord of the Weejuns", Frazier's liner notes for the 1965 album Miles Davis' Greatest Hits (reprinted in Ivy Style, May 10, 2010)
