= Teague Moriarty =

American chef (born 1983)

- Born: 1983 (age 42–43); Santa Cruz, California
- Education: California Culinary Academy
- Culinary career
- Cooking style: Modern American
- Ratings: Michelin stars; SF Chronicles
- Current restaurants: Sons & Daughters (restaurant); Sweet Woodruff; The Square
- Awards won: James Beard Foundation Rising Star Chef; San Francisco Chronicle Rising Star Chef 2012; Forbes Magazine 30 under 30 in Food & Wine; Zagat SF 2012 30 under 30

Teague Moriarty (born April 21, 1983) is an American chef best known for holding a Michelin star at his San Francisco restaurant called Sons & Daughters. He has since opened The Square and Sweet Woodruff, also in San Francisco.

== Biography ==
As a Northern California native with roots in Santa Cruz, Teague gained his experience from places around the Bay—his career includes baking at Emily's Bakery in Santa Cruz; Limón Rotisserie in San Francisco; B Restaurant & Bar in Oakland; and Gregoire in Berkeley. Teague, along with Matt McNamara—a friend he met at California Culinary Academy in 2004—developed and opened Sons & Daughters in 2010. In addition to their restaurant endeavors, Teague and Matt started Dark Hill Farm in 2013, a produce and livestock farm fully supporting the Sons & Daughters Restaurant Group as a means to manage, maintain, and increase quality. The farm is located in Santa Cruz and is a closed loop between the restaurant and the farm—not open to the public.

== Accolades ==
Moriarty's accolades include recognition as a Rising Star Chef by the James Beard Foundation, a Rising Star Chef in 2012 by San Francisco Chronicle, Best Restaurant in SF by GQ Magazine, 30 Under 30 in SF by Zagat, and 30 under 30 in Food and Wine by Forbes Magazine.
