= Michael Moriarty (author and educator) =

Michael Moriarty (born 8 March 1954) is a native of County Carlow, Ireland, and the author of several motivational and Irish history-related books. For over twenty years (1997–2018), he was involved at the highest level of education and training in the Republic of Ireland, having been General Secretary of Education and Training Boards Ireland (ETBI) and of its predecessor the Irish Vocational Education Association (IVEA). From 2014 to 2020 he was also president of the European Federation of Education Employers (EFEE).

== Career ==
In 2019 Michael Moriarty published his first book on leadership development, Every Leader's Reality Guide. In 2020 he published his second book, What It Said in the Papers – The Execution of Kevin Barry, a historical account of the trial and execution of the Irish patriot Kevin Barry. In 2021 his third book on unleashing personal potential in the workplace, How to Bring Your Best Self to Work – Strategies for Career Success, was published.

From 1997 to 2018 Moriarty oversaw a major restructuring of the Further Education and Training (FET) sector in Ireland, which arose from the enactment of the Education and Training Boards Act 2013. The process included the renaming of IVEA to Education and Training Boards Ireland (ETBI) and the amalgamation of IVEA's 33 member Vocational Education Committees (VECs) into 16 statutory regional Education and Training Boards (ETBs) which also took on the training functions of FÁS, the dissolved national training authority.

From 2014 to 2020 Moriarty was president of the European Federation of Education Employers (EFEE) which is composed of education employer organisations from across the EU/EFTA countries. EFEE is a partner with ETUCE, the European Trade Union Committee for Education, in the European Sectoral Social Dialogue body for Education (ESSDE)], which is consulted by the European Commission on education policy and initiatives.

Moriarty was the chief executive of the since defunct Carlow Kildare Radio from 1989 to 1997.

== Board and other appointments ==
Moriarty served on the board of the Broadcasting Authority of Ireland from 2010 to 2015. He was a board member of the former national training authority FÁS prior to its dissolution in 2013, and was a member of Ireland's National Skills Council from 2017 to 2018. In 2021 Moriarty was appointed as a member of the Governing Body of Carlow College.

He is a former president of the County Carlow Chamber of Commerce and was a member of the executive committee of County Kildare Chamber.

== Awards and recognition ==
Moriarty received the Waterford Crystal Quality of Life Award in the Southeast Region in 1989 for his work in the community. In 2016, he was awarded the international Albert Schweitzer Leadership for Life award, in recognition of his lifelong commitment to education and his leadership in education, training and structural reform.
