= Richard Severo =

American journalist (1932–2023)

- Born: Thomas Richard Severo; November 22, 1932; Newburgh, New York, U.S.
- Died: June 12, 2023 (aged 90); Balmville, New York, U.S.
- Occupation: Journalist

Thomas Richard Severo (November 22, 1932 – June 12, 2023) was an American science journalist who wrote for The New York Times from 1968 to 2006. During that time, he won a George Polk Award from Long Island University in 1975, as well as a Meyer "Mike" Berger Award from the Columbia School of Journalism.

Severo earned a Bachelor of Arts in History from Colgate University in 1954.

In the 1980s, he also attracted considerable media attention for a prolonged public dispute he had with A. M. Rosenthal, who was the Times' executive editor at the time. Severo claimed that Rosenthal had retaliated against him for publishing a book based on his reporting for the Times with an external publishing company rather than the Times' own publishing house, Times Books. Rosenthal denied this accusation, calling Severo's complaint "a fantasy in his mind" and stating that Severo had been treated "extremely fairly and lovingly over the years". The resulting book, Lisa H: The True Story of an Extraordinary and Courageous Woman, was published by Harper & Row in 1985. After four years of arbitration hearings, the dispute ultimately ended in September 1988 when an arbitrator ruled in favor of the Times.

Severo died from complications of Parkinson's disease on June 12, 2023, at the age of 90. His last Times byline was posthumous; he had co-written with Peter Keepnews the obituary for Tom Lehrer.
