= Thomas Vinciguerra =

American journalist (1963–2021)

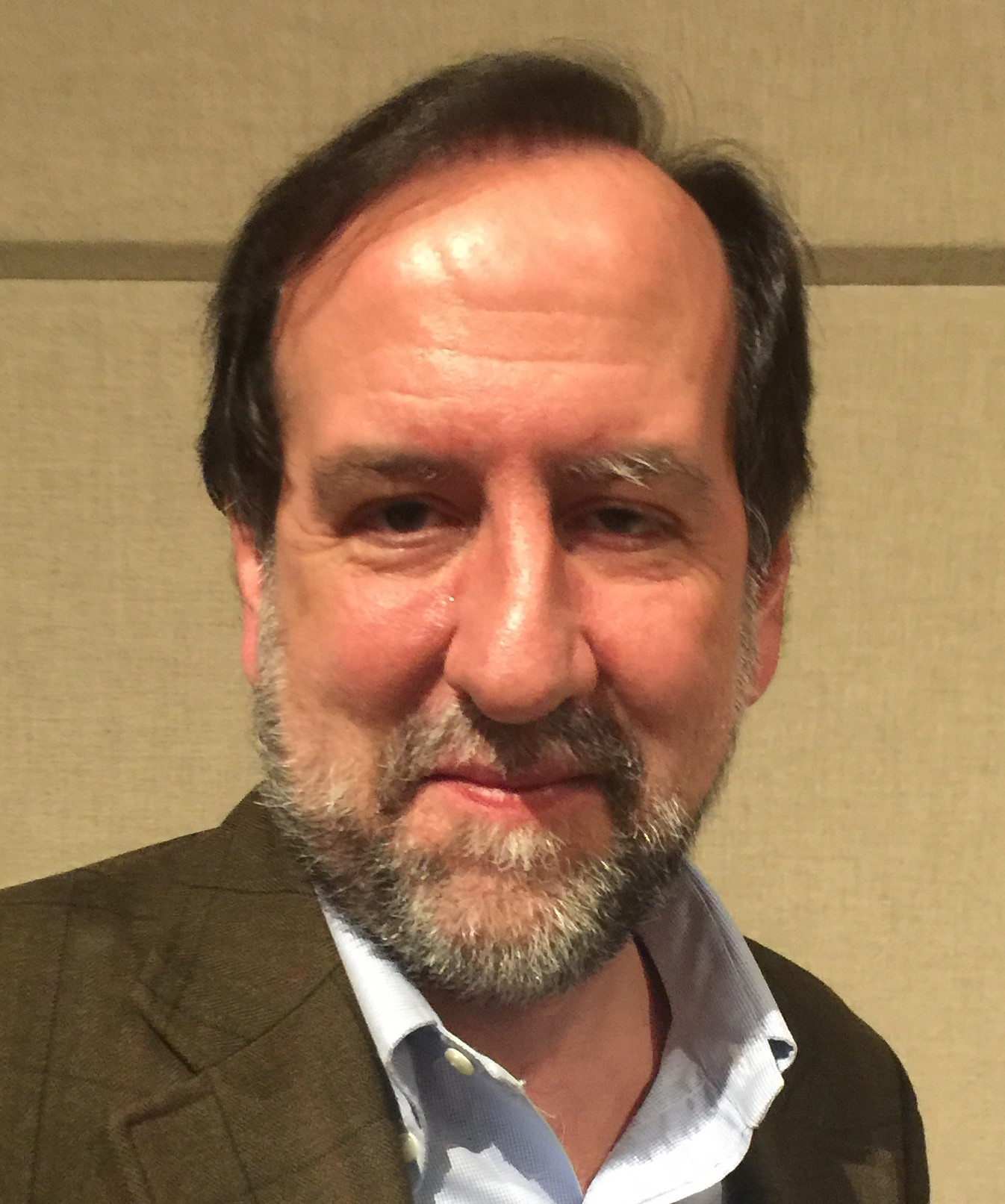
- Vinciguerra in 2015
- Born: October 8, 1963
- Died: February 22, 2021 (aged 57); Garden City, New York, U.S.
- Education: Columbia University (BA) Columbia School of Journalism (MS) Columbia Graduate School of Arts and Sciences(MA)
- Occupations: Writer, author

Thomas Vinciguerra (October 8, 1963 – February 22, 2021) was an American journalist, editor, and author. A founding editor of The Week magazine, he published about popular culture, nostalgia and other subjects in The New York Times, The Wall Street Journal, The New Yorker and GQ.

== Background ==
Thomas Viniguerra was born on October 8, 1963. His parents William Vinciguerra and Aurora Locicero were public school teachers in Levittown, New York for four decades. Raised in Garden City, New York, he attended Columbia College, where he was an editor of the Columbia Daily Spectator and was involved with The Varsity Show. Graduating in 1985 with a BA in history, he continued studies on campus, receiving his MS from the Columbia University Graduate School of Journalism the following year. While at the Journalism School he refounded the Philolexian Society, Columbia's oldest student organization; he was subsequently designated its "Avatar." In 1990, he received an MA in English from the Columbia University Graduate School of Arts and Sciences.

== Career ==
From 1987 to 1998, Vinciguerra served as an editor at Columbia College Today, the college's alumni publication. He joined The Week upon inception in 2001 through 2010. Subsequently, he was executive editor of Indian Country Today Media Network.

Vinciguerra was editor of Conversations with Elie Wiesel (Schocken, 2001) and Backward Ran Sentences: The Best of Wolcott Gibbs from The New Yorker (Bloomsbury, 2011). Book critic Jonathan Yardley of The Washington Post selected Backward Ran Sentences as one of his 11 best books of 2011. In November 2015, he published the original volume Cast of Characters: Wolcott Gibbs, E.B. White, James Thurber and the Golden Age of the New Yorker (W.W. Norton), which chronicles the early years of the New Yorker magazine. He appeared on the History Channel, NY1, Fox News, John Batchelor Show, and the Leonard Lopate Show, among other venues.

His newspaper writings on popular culture covered a variety of topics, with frequent articles on both Star Trek and James Bond. Vinciguerra also wrote obituaries, including for Sean Connery, Rodney Dangerfield, John Ashberry, Leka Zogu and others. He also wrote at least two articles on the topic of obituary writing.

== Death and legacy ==
Thomas Vinciguerra died at the age of 57 on February 22, 2021. He is buried at Pine Lawn Memorial Park in Farmingdale, NY.

Ronald Wilmer, Columbia Class of 1986, wrote that Vinciguerra:

was a valued member of the Columbia community. He frequently contributed to Columbia Magazine and Columbia College Today... Late last year, Columbia University Press published Tom’s last book: an anthology, which he edited, called A Community of Scholars: Seventy-Five Years of The University Seminars at Columbia. It’s a fitting final work for a writer who earned three degrees at Columbia.

Audere magazine remembered Vinciguerra as "Embracing his Weird":

Vinciguerra’s writing talents were spectacular and effortless, but he veered to the obscure. During his college years, at Columbia, he enthusiastically revived the long-dead "Philolexian" debating society, which thanks to his enthusiastic, not entirely un-weird efforts, survives to this day. Indeed, Vinciguerra embraced his own weirdness without apology. When Time Magazine published an anonymous photograph of him during the 1980s and called him a "trekkie," he sternly wrote them a correction: he was a "trekker," he insisted, not a "trekkie," a distinction that only a trekkie could possibly have known.

== Works ==
Books:

- Conversations with Elie Wiesel (Schocken, 2001)
- Backward Ran Sentences: The Best of Wolcott Gibbs from The New Yorker (Bloomsbury, 2011)
- Cast of Characters: Wolcott Gibbs, E.B. White, James Thurber and the Golden Age of the New Yorker (W.W. Norton, 2015)

Books Edited:

- A Community of Scholars: Seventy-Five Years of The University Seminars at Columbia (2020)

Articles:

- Daily Beast
- New York Times
- Wall Street Journal
