= Heart Gear =

Japanese manga series

- Cover of the first volume
- Genre: Adventure; Post-apocalyptic; Science fiction
- Manga
- Written by: Tsuyoshi Takaki
- Published by: Shueisha
- English publisher: NA: Viz Media
- Imprint: Jump Comics+
- Magazine: Shōnen Jump+
- Original run: April 3, 2019 – June 26, 2024
- Volumes: 7

Heart Gear (stylized in all caps) is a Japanese manga series written and illustrated by Tsuyoshi Takaki. The series was serialized on Shueisha's Shōnen Jump+ manga website from April 2019 to June 2024, with its individual chapters collected into seven volumes.

When creating the series, Takaki decided on using a young girl and robot as protagonists in a post-apocalyptic setting in order to write a science fiction manga that is relatable to a wide audience. Takaki also used the film Android for inspiration in creating the story, various objects from his everyday life, and photos of famous places in creating the setting.

The series has performed well internationally, especially in France, where its sales have surpassed those of its native country. Critical response has generally been positive, with many critics praising the characters, post-apocalyptic setting, and artwork.

== Production ==
Takaki was fond of the science fiction genre, so after the completion of Black Torch, Takaki wanted to create a science fiction manga. He ultimately chose to make it post-apocalyptic with robots, though he feared that it would be hard for some readers to understand. After discussing this with his editor, he ultimately settled on a young girl and a robot as the main protagonists in order to have two separate viewpoints to write from. When writing the robots in the series, Takaki recalled being fascinated with the human-like robots from the 1982 American film Android, so he used them as a model when writing the series.

Takaki initially had trouble with the setting, as he wanted it to seem futuristic at first sight, but at the same time not become pure fantasy. In order to achieve this, he used things from his daily life like trees, utility poles, and buildings, along with photos on the internet, particularly those of ruins or famous places as a model.

== Media ==
=== Manga ===
Written and illustrated by Tsuyoshi Takaki, the series began bi-weekly serialization on Shueisha's Shōnen Jump+ manga website on April 3, 2019. In May 2020, the series was put hiatus due to the health of the author. The series returned from its two-year long hiatus in August 2022, before beginning another in December 2022. It resumed publication in January 2024. The series ended serialization on June 26, 2024. The series' first tankōbon (bound) volume was released on July 4, 2019, while the seven and last volume was released on August 2, 2024.

In April 2019, Shueisha began publishing the series in English via their Manga Plus service, with chapters releasing simultaneously with their Japanese release. At New York Comic Con 2022, Viz Media announced that they licensed the series for English publication. The series is also licensed in France by Ki-oon.

==== Volumes ====
No.	Original release date	Original ISBN	English release date	English ISBN
1	July 4, 2019	978-4-08-882036-1	August 15, 2023	978-1-9747-3892-2
1. "Walk This Way"; 2. "Face 2 Face"; 3. "If Gears Don't Sleep, Can They Dream?"; 4. "Stilling, Still Dreaming"; 5. "Defensive Instincts"
2	November 1, 2019	978-4-08-882123-8	November 21, 2023	978-1-9747-4079-6
6. "The Defender"; 7. "A Rainy Monday"; 8. "The Hands of a Clock"; 9. "Determination"; 10. "Pawns on the Board"; 11. "Master Mind"; 12. "Inside and Outside"; 13. "Proof of the Wild"
3	March 4, 2020	978-4-08-882208-2	February 20, 2024	978-1-9747-4304-9
14. "Why I'm Me"; 15. "Vili Vili"; 16. "Thinker"; 17. "Silence"; 18. "Mandala"; 19. "Overture to Bad Omens"; 20. "Battlecry"; 21. "Viva☆Rock"
4	August 4, 2022	978-4-08-882256-3	May 21, 2024	978-1-9747-4558-6
22. "Ultimate Weapon"; 23. "Fight the Power"; 24. "Emotions"; 25. "Born to Lose"; 26. "One Heart"; 27. "Hands; 28. "Walking Life"; 29. "Cheep Talk"; -interlude-
5	April 4, 2024	978-4-08-883317-0	June 17, 2025	978-1-9747-4626-2
30. "Revive"; 31. "Time of Your Life"; 32. "Triple Threat: Three Beast Shit"; 33. "Jamming"; 34. "Gunshot"; 35. "MORTAL MAN"; 36. "Stop the Violence"
6	June 4, 2024	978-4-08-884052-9	September 16, 2025	978-1-9747-5802-9
37. "BLOOD."; 38. "The Will of Heaven is Mine (Ready to Shoot)"; 39. "Escape Funk"; 40. "1,000,000 Monsters Attack"; 41. "Kill 'Em All"; 42. "What You Want"; 43. "Mixture"; 44. "Dead Heat"
7	August 2, 2024	978-4-08-884152-6	December 16, 2025	978-1-9747-5803-6
45. "Big Town Rhapsody"; 46. "Welcome 2 My Room"; 47. "The Truth Behind the Rumor"; 48. "That Is The Question"; 49. "Harvest"; 50. "4 the Answer"; 51. "Let's Become Family"; 52. "Beautiful World"

=== Other ===
Chrome, one of the series' main protagonists, is featured in the video game Captain Velvet Meteor: The Jump+ Dimensions.

== Reception ==
The series has sold three times more copies in France than in Japan.

Critical response to the story and characters has generally been positive. Erkael from Manga News liked the setting. He also offered praise for the characters and the way they interact to advance the story. However, Erkael also felt that the story uses too many common elements of shōnen manga. Faustine Lillaz from Planete BD liked the relationship between the human and robot characters and the setting, though she also felt the world building was a bit too subtle. Skeet from Manga Sanctuary enjoyed the emotions of the story, particularly the less-serious parts. However, Skeet also felt the series was a bit generic. Marc Vandermeer from ActuaBD liked the post-apocalyptic setting, calling it realistic; he also favorably compared several elements of the story to The Girl from the Other Side: Siúil, a Rún. However, he felt the author gave Chrome too much power in the action scenes.

Critical response to the artwork has also been positive. Erkael liked the artstyle, feeling that it helped to make the story feel more immersing and make the action scenes more intense. Skeet liked the variety in pencil strokes used by Takaki, feeling that it made the story feel more impactful. Vandermeer felt the artwork helped to make the story and characters, particularly the robots, feel more captivating and interesting. Though he also felt the artist had trouble drawing some characters' faces.

== See also ==
- Black Torch, another manga series by the same author
