= Jim Moriarty (luger) =

American luger (born 1941)

Personal information
- Born: November 7, 1941 (age 84) Saint Paul, Minnesota, United States

Sport
- Sport: Luge

Jim Moriarty (born November 7, 1941) is an American luger. He competed at the 1968 Winter Olympics and the 1976 Winter Olympics.
