= Moriarty =

Moriarty may refer to:

- Moriarty (name), an Irish surname

== Places ==
- Moriarty, New Mexico, United States, a city
  - Moriarty Air Force Station, a closed United States Air Force radar station
- Mount Moriarty, British Columbia, Canada
- Moriarty, Tasmania, a locality in Tasmania, Australia
- Moriarty Rocks, Tasmania, Australia
- 5048 Moriarty, a main-belt asteroid

== Arts and entertainment ==
=== Fictional characters ===
- Professor Moriarty, Sherlock Holmes' nemesis
- Jim Moriarty, one of the main antagonists in the British TV series Sherlock
- Jamie Moriarty, a.k.a. Irene Adler, in the TV series Elementary
- Moriarty, a.k.a. Mira Troy, in the 2022 movie Enola Holmes 2
- Jack Moriarty, in the Holmes-inspired television series House
- Count Jim Moriarty, character in The Goon Show
- Dean Moriarty, in the novel On the Road by Jack Kerouac
- Moriarty, in the 1970 film Kelly's Heroes
- Colin Moriarty, crime boss and owner of Moriarty's Saloon in the video game Fallout 3
- Mark Moriarty, in the 1993 DOS game Eagle Eye Mysteries

=== Other ===
- Moriarty (band), a French-American group
- Moriarty (novel), by Anthony Horowitz
- Moriarty (podcast), a mystery drama podcast
