= P. J. Moriarty =

American restaurateur (1900s–1977)

- Born: 1907–1909; Anascaul, County Kerry, Ireland
- Died: December 30, 1977 (aged 68 or 69); New York City
- Occupation: Restaurateur
- Years active: 1948–1977
- Military career
- Allegiance: United States
- Branch: U. S. Coast Guard
- Rank: Chief petty officer
- Conflict: World War II

Patrick John Moriarty (1907–1909 – December 30, 1977) was an Irish-born American restaurateur. In 1929, he emigrated to the United States from Anascaul, County Kerry, Ireland, and settled in New York City. After working in the restaurant industry and serving in the United States Coast Guard during World War II, Moriarty opened his first restaurant, P. J. Moriarty's, in 1948. He eventually owned several restaurants bearing his name in Midtown Manhattan, Turtle Bay, and across the street from Penn Station. His restaurants, which served dishes such as steaks, chops, and stews, were popular with the Rockettes, journalists like Hal Boyle and Bob Considine, the cartoonist and animator Walt Kelly, and Irish politicians. Moriarty gained national fame in 1955 when he was caught placing a fake fire hydrant in front of his building to prevent parking and a police patrolman noticed that the hydrant had disappeared after he had ticketed a car for parking next to it. Moriarty died in 1977, aged 68 or 69. His final restaurant closed in 1981 or 1982; the building was purchased by Donald Trump and demolished to make way for Trump Plaza.

== Early life ==
Moriarty was born between 1907 and 1909 in Anascaul, County Kerry, Ireland, and raised on a farm. According to the Associated Press correspondent Hugh A. Mulligan, Moriarty was "craggily handsome with dark bushy eyebrows" and he "resembled a bit player playing a publican in a John Ford movie, except he had the George Burns knack of holding a cigar in a lordly fashion, which made him like any of the many Tammany Hall aldermen who frequented his establishment".

In 1929, Moriarty emigrated to the United States and settled in New York City, where he worked as a bellboy and a bartender. He served as a chief petty officer in the United States Coast Guard during World War II, during which time he learned the food service industry as a commissary worker.

== Restaurateur ==
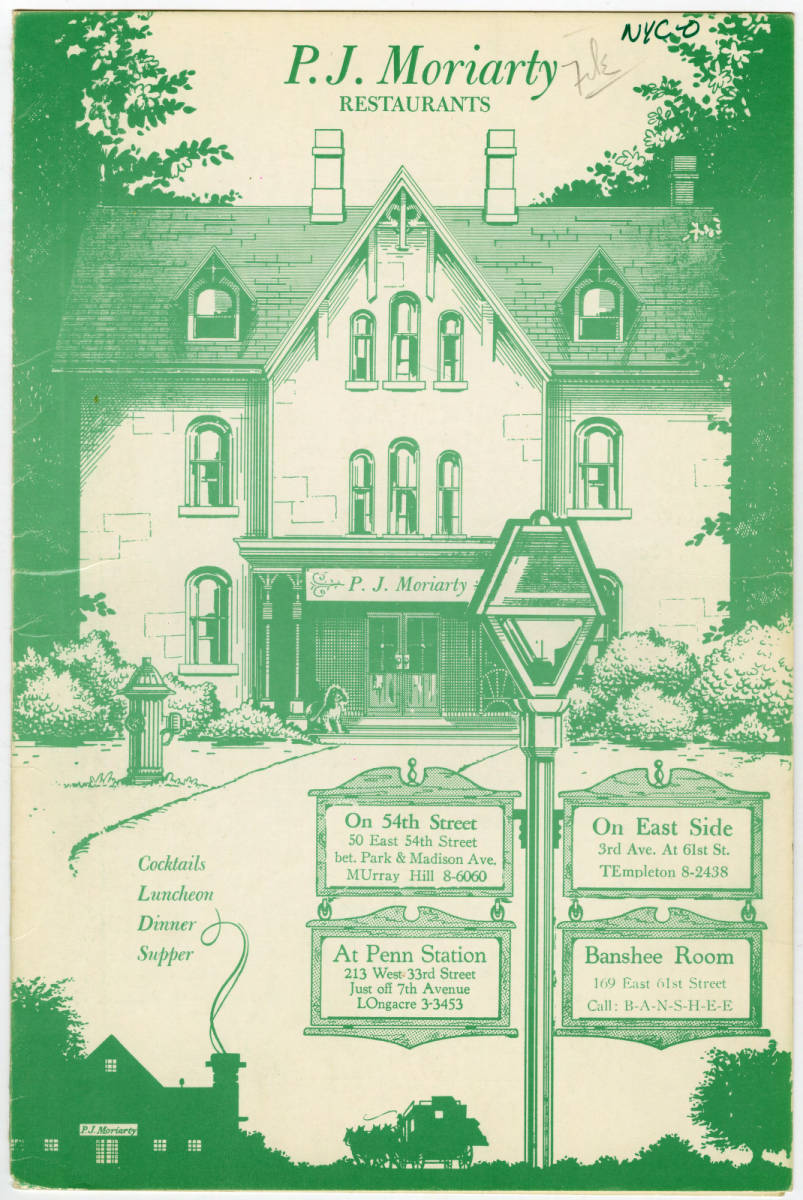
Cover of St. Patrick's Day menu, date unknown

In 1948, Moriarty opened P. J. Moriarty's at 47 West 51st Street, between Fifth and Sixth avenues. A few years later, Moriarty opened a second location on Sixth Avenue. Over the course of his career, Moriarty owned several restaurants bearing his name, including at 50 East 54th Street (between Madison and Park avenues), 1690 York Avenue, Third Avenue and 63rd Street, 1034 Third Avenue (at 61st Street), and 33rd Street across from Penn Station.

According to The New York Times, the original P. J. Moriarty's "resembl[ed] ... an old English chophouse" and served "sirloin steak, lamb stew, and swordfish steak"; it also featured an "extensive wine list". The Times wrote that patrons "welcomed the ambiance—the 40-foot mahogany bar, the small tables with red cloths, the dim lights under original Tiffany shades, [and] the hunting pictures". The restaurant was across the street from the stage door for Radio City Music Hall and became popular with the Rockettes, who performed there. It was also popular with Irish politicians, news reporters and journalists, such as the Associated Press columnist Hal Boyle and Bob Considine, and the cartoonist and animator Walt Kelly.

The location at 1034 Third Avenue, which opened in 1958, featured a miniature version of the Third Avenue El train on the walls above the bar. The bar also featured what Moriarty claimed was the first backwards clock so that news reporters could see the time in the mirror above the bar. Like the original location, it served steaks and chops, as well as Irish-American dishes like corned beef and cabbage.

== Fake fire hydrant incident ==
Moriarty and his restaurants gained nationwide fame in 1955 after he was caught placing a fake fire hydrant in front of the Sixth Avenue location to prevent unwanted street parking blocking the entrance. A patrolman with the New York City Police Department discovered the fake after realizing that the hydrant had disappeared after he had ticketed a car for parking there. Moriarty initially feigned ignorance of the fake hydrant but later admitted that he had paid $10 to the "property man" at Radio City Music Hall for the prop. He told the press that "it worked better than a doorman". The police "said they guessed it would be hard to fine a fellow for parking in front of a fire plug that wasn't a fire plug", while Moriarty persuaded the chief magistrate judge to dismiss the ensuing charges against him upon his explanation that "it must have been the leprechauns".

== Death ==
Moriarty died on December 30, 1977, aged 68 or 69. At the time of his death, the P. J. Moriarty's location at 1034 Third Avenue was the last open. Moriarty's wife and his brother continued to operate the restaurant until it closed in late 1981 or early 1982, when the property was purchased by Donald Trump, who demolished the building to build Trump Plaza. At the time, local small property owners interpreted the restaurant's closing "as the disappearance of one of the last vestiges of an 'old' Third Ave. that predated nationwide chains and big-money developers".

== See also ==
- Costello's
- Neary's
