= Paddy Moriarty =

Irish Gaelic footballer

Patrick Moriarty
Personal information
- Native name: Pádraig Ó Muireartaigh (Irish)
- Born: Armagh, Northern Ireland

Sport
- Sport: Gaelic football
- Position: Corner forward
Club
- Years: Club
- Wolfe Tone GAC, Derrymacash
Inter-county
- Years: County
- Armagh
Inter-county titles
- Ulster titles: 1
- All Stars: 2

Paddy Moriarty (sometimes known as Pat Moriarty) is a former Gaelic footballer who played for the Wolfe Tone GAC, Derrymacash club and at senior level for the Armagh county team.

He won two All Stars, in 1972 and 1977, the first in the corner forward position and the second at centre half back. He was also named in the Irish Independent's 125 Greatest Stars of the GAA at number 104. He was on the losing side in the 1977 All-Ireland SFC final.
