= Japanese name =

Yamada Tarō (山田太郎), a Japanese placeholder name (male), equivalent to John Smith in English. The equivalent of Jane Smith would be Yamada Hanako (山田花子).

Japanese names (日本人の氏名、日本人の姓名、日本人の名前, Nihonjin no shimei, Nihonjin no seimei, Nihonjin no namae) in modern times consist of a family name (surname) followed by a given name. Japanese names are usually written in kanji, where the pronunciation follows a special set of rules. Because parents when naming children, and foreigners when adopting a Japanese name, are able to choose which pronunciations they want for certain kanji, the same written form of a name may have multiple readings. In exceptional cases, this makes it impossible to determine the intended pronunciation of a name with certainty. Even so, most pronunciations chosen for names are common, making them easier to read. While any jōyō kanji (with some exceptions for readability) and jinmeiyō kanji may be used as part of a name, names may be rejected if they are believed to fall outside what would be considered an acceptable name by measures of common sense.

Japanese names may be written in hiragana or katakana, the Japanese language syllabaries for words of Japanese or foreign origin, respectively. As such, names written in hiragana or katakana are a phonetic rendering and lack meanings that are expressed by names written in the logographic kanji.

== Structure ==
The majority of Japanese people have one surname and one given name, except for the Japanese imperial family, whose members have no surname. The family name precedes the given name. People with mixed Japanese and foreign parentage may have middle names.

Very few names are in use both as surnames and as given names (for example Mayumi (真弓), Izumi (泉), Masuko (益子), or Arata (新)). Therefore, to those familiar with Japanese names, which name is the surname and which is the given name is usually apparent, no matter in which order the names are presented. It is thus unlikely that the two names will be confused, for example, when writing in English while using the family name-given name naming order. However, due to the variety of pronunciations and differences in languages, some common surnames and given names may coincide when Romanized: e.g., Maki (真紀、麻紀、真樹) (given name) and Maki (真木、槇、牧) (surname).

=== Family names ===
The term surname or family name can translate into three different Japanese words, myōji (苗字), uji (氏), and sei (姓), which historically had different meanings. Sei (姓) was originally the patrilineal surname which was granted by the emperor as a title of male rank. In the 8th century, eight types of sei were established, but later all surnames except for ason (朝臣) almost disappeared. Uji (氏) was another name used to designate patrilineal clan. Uji and Sei used in the set: e.g., Minamoto no Ason (源朝臣), Taira no Ason (平朝臣), Fujiwara no Ason (藤原朝臣). Uji and sei together are called seishi or shōji (姓氏) and also simply sei. There were relatively few sei of the medieval noble clans, and they trace their lineage either directly to these sei or to the courtiers of these sei. Myōji (苗字) was simply what a family chooses to call itself, as opposed to the sei granted by the emperor. While it was passed on patrilineally in male ancestors including in haku (uncles), one had a certain degree of freedom in changing one's myōji. See also kabane.

According to estimates, there are over 300,000 different surnames in use today in Japan. The three most common family names in Japan are Satō (佐藤), Suzuki (鈴木), and Takahashi (高橋). People in Japan began using surnames during the Muromachi period. Japanese peasants had surnames in the Edo period; however, they could not use them in public.

Most surnames are written with two kanji characters, but some common surnames are written with one or three kanji. Some surnames written with four or five kanji exist, such as Kadenokōji (勘解由小路), but these are rare.

One large category of family names can be categorized as -tō names. The kanji 藤, meaning wisteria, has the on'yomi tō (or, with rendaku, dō). Many Japanese people have surnames that include this kanji as the second character. This is because the Fujiwara clan (藤原家) gave their samurai surnames (myōji) ending with the first character of their name (which can be pronounced either fuji or tō), to denote their status in an era when commoners were not allowed surnames. Examples include Atō, Andō, Itō (although a different final kanji is also common), Udō, Etō, Endō, Gotō, Jitō, Katō, Kitō, Kudō, Kondō, Saitō, Satō, Shindō, Sudō, Naitō, Bitō, and Mutō. As already noted, some of the most common family names are in this list.

Japanese family names usually include characters referring to places and geographic features.

=== Given names ===
Given names are called the "name" (名, mei) or "lower name" (下の名前, shita no namae), because, in vertically written Japanese, the given name appears under the family name.

While family names follow relatively consistent rules, given names are much more diverse in pronunciation and characters. While many common names can easily be spelled or pronounced, parents may choose names with unusual characters or pronunciations; the pronunciation of such names generally cannot be inferred from the written form, or vice versa. Unusual pronunciations have become much more common, as the trend has significantly increased in popularity since the 1990s. For example, the popular masculine name 大翔 is traditionally pronounced "Hiroto", but in recent years alternative pronunciations "Haruto", "Yamato", "Taiga", "Sora", "Taito", "Daito", and "Masato" have all entered use.

Male names often end in -rō (郎/朗, "son" or "clear, bright") (e.g. "Ichirō"), -ta (太, "great, thick" or "first [son]") (e.g. "Kenta"), or -o (男/雄/夫, "man") (e.g. "Teruo" or "Akio"). Male names often also contain ichi (一, "first [son]") (e.g. "Ken'ichi"), kazu (一, "first [son]") (also written with 一, along with several other possible characters; e.g. "Kazuhiro"), ji (二/次, "second [son]" or "next") (e.g. "Jirō"), or dai (大, "great, large") (e.g. "Daichi").

Female names often end in -ko (子, "child") (e.g. "Keiko") or -mi (美, "beauty") (e.g. "Yumi"). Other popular endings for female names include -ka (香/花, "scent, perfume" or "flower") (e.g. "Reika") and -na (奈/菜, "greens" or "apple tree") (e.g. "Haruna").

Most personal names use one, two, or three kanji. Four-syllable given names are common, especially in eldest sons.

The usage of -ko (子) has changed significantly over the years: prior to the Meiji Restoration (1868), it was reserved for members of the imperial family. Following the restoration, it became popular and was overwhelmingly common in the Taishō and early Shōwa era. The suffix -ko increased in popularity after the mid-20th century.

Around the year 2006, due to the citizenry mimicking naming habits of popular entertainers, the suffix -ko was declining in popularity. At the same time, names of western origin, written in kana, were becoming increasingly popular for naming of girls. By 2004 there was a trend of using hiragana instead of kanji in naming girls.

Molly Hakes said that this may have to do with using hiragana out of cultural pride, since hiragana is Japan's indigenous writing form, or out of not assigning a meaning to a girl's name so that others do not have a particular expectation of her.

Names ending with -ko dropped significantly in popularity in the mid-1980s, but are still given, though much less than in the past. Male names occasionally end with the syllable -ko as in Mako, but very rarely using the kanji 子 (most often, if a male name ends in -ko, it ends in -hiko, using the kanji 彦 meaning "boy"). Common male name endings are -shi and -o; names ending with -shi are often adjectives, e.g., Atsushi, which might mean, for example, "(to be) faithful."

Katakana and hiragana spellings are characteristic of feminine names rather than masculine names, with katakana often used for women's names in the early 20th century due to being easier to read and write.

A single name-forming element, such as hiro ("expansiveness") can be written by more than one kanji (博, 弘, or 浩). Conversely, a particular kanji can have multiple meanings and pronunciations. In some names, Japanese characters phonetically "spell" a name and have no intended meaning behind them. Many Japanese personal names use puns.

Although usually written in kanji, Japanese names have distinct differences from Chinese names through the selection of characters in a name and the pronunciation of them. A Japanese person can distinguish a Japanese name from a Chinese name. Akie Tomozawa said that this was equivalent to how "Europeans can easily tell that the name 'Smith' is English and 'Schmidt' is German or that 'Victor' is English or French and 'Vittorio' is Italian".

== Characters ==
Japanese names are usually written in kanji, although some names use hiragana or even katakana, or a mixture of kanji and kana. While most "traditional" names use kun'yomi (native Japanese) kanji readings, a large number of given names and surnames use on'yomi (Japanese sound, often Chinese-based) kanji readings as well. Many others use readings which are only used in names (nanori), such as the female name Nozomi (希).

The sound no, indicating possession (like the Saxon genitive in English), and corresponding to the character の, is often included in names but not written as a separate character, as in the common name i-no-ue (井上, well-(possessive)-top/above, top of the well), or historical figures such as Sen no Rikyū.

=== Difficulty of reading names ===
A name written in kanji may have more than one common pronunciation, only one of which is correct for a given individual. For example, the surname written in kanji as 東海林 may be read either Tōkairin or Shōji. Conversely, any one name may have several possible written forms, and again, only one will be correct for a given individual. The character 一 when used as a male given name may be used as the written form for "Hajime", "Hitoshi", "Ichi-/-ichi" "Kazu-/-kazu", and many others. The name Hajime may be written with any of the following: 始, 治, 初, 一, 元, 肇, 創, 甫, 基, 哉, 啓, 本, 源, 東, 大, 孟, or 祝. This many-to-many correspondence between names and the ways they are written is much more common with male given names than with surnames or female given names but can be observed in all these categories. The permutations of potential characters and sounds can become enormous, as some very overloaded sounds may be produced by over 500 distinct kanji and some kanji characters can stand for several dozen sounds. This can and does make the collation, pronunciation, and romanization of a Japanese name a very difficult problem. For this reason, business cards often include the pronunciation of the name as furigana, and forms and documents often include spaces to write the reading of the name in kana (usually katakana).

A few Japanese names, particularly family names, include archaic versions of characters. For example, the very common character shima, "island", may be written as 嶋 or 嶌 instead of the usual 島. Some names also feature very uncommon kanji, or even kanji which no longer exist in modern Japanese. Japanese people who have such names are likely to compromise by substituting similar or simplified characters. This may be difficult for input of kanji in computers, as many kanji databases on computers only include common and regularly used kanji, and many archaic or mostly unused characters are not included.

An example of such a name is Saitō: there are two common kanji for sai here. The two sai characters have different meanings: 斉 means "together" or "parallel", but 斎 means "to purify". These names can also exist written in archaic forms, as 齊藤 and 齋藤 respectively.

A problem occurs when an elderly person forgets how to write their name in old kanji that is no longer used.

Family names are sometimes written with periphrastic readings, called jukujikun, in which the written characters relate indirectly to the name as spoken. For example, 四月一日 would normally be read as shigatsu tsuitachi ("April 1st"), but as a family name it is read watanuki ("unpadded clothes"), because the first day of the fourth lunar month (in the old lunar calendar, closer to 1 May) is the traditional date to switch from winter to summer clothes. In the same way 小鳥遊 would normally be read as kotori asobi ("little birds play") or shōchōyū, but is read Takanashi, because little birds (kotori) play (asobi) where there are no (nashi) hawks (taka).

Most Japanese people and agencies have adopted customs to deal with these issues. Address books, for instance, often contain furigana or ruby characters to clarify the pronunciation of the name. Japanese nationals are also required to give a romanized name for their passport.

Not all names are complicated. Some common names are summarized by the phrase tanakamura ("the village in the middle of the rice fields"): the three kanji (ta (田, "rice field"), naka (中, "middle") and mura (村, "village")), together in any pair, form a simple, reasonably common surname: Tanaka, Nakamura, Murata, Nakata (Nakada), Muranaka, Tamura.

Despite these difficulties, there are enough patterns and recurring names that most native Japanese will be able to read virtually all family names they encounter and the majority of personal names.

=== Regulations ===
Kanji names in Japan are governed by the Japanese Ministry of Justice's rules on kanji use in names. As of January 2015, only the 843 "name kanji" (jinmeiyō kanji) and 2,136 "commonly used characters" (jōyō kanji) are permitted for use in personal names. This is intended to ensure that names can be readily written and read by those literate in Japanese. Names may be rejected if they are considered unacceptable; for example, in 1993 two parents who tried to name their child Akuma (悪魔), which means "devil", were prohibited from doing so after a massive public outcry.

Though there are regulations on the naming of children, many archaic characters can still be found in adults' names, particularly those born prior to the Second World War. Because the legal restrictions on use of such kanji cause inconvenience for those with such names and promote a proliferation of identical names, many recent changes have been made to increase rather than to reduce the number of kanji allowed for use in names. The Sapporo High Court held that it was unlawful for the government to deny registration of a child's name because it contained a kanji character that was relatively common but not included in the official list of name characters compiled by the Ministry of Justice. Subsequently, the Japanese government promulgated plans to increase the number of kanji "permitted" in names.

The use of a space in given names (to separate first and middle names) is not allowed in official documents, because technically, a space is not an allowed character. However, spaces are sometimes used on business cards and in correspondence.

== Customs ==
Historically, families consisted of many children and it was a common practice to name sons by numbers suffixed with rō (郎, "son"). The first son would be known as "Ichirō", the second as "Jirō", and so on. Girls were often named with ko (子, "child") at the end of the given name (this should not be confused with the less common male suffix hiko (彦)). Both practices have become less common, although many children continue to be given names that originate from these conventions.

=== Speaking to and of others ===
Conventions of direct address and name use in conversation are heavily governed by respect for those considered in higher social positions (e.g. older family members, teachers, employers), familiarity with those considered to be in lower social positions (e.g. younger family members, students, employees) and the speaker's relationships with the listener and the addressee. Typically, the family name is used to refer to an individual, and personal or given names are largely restricted to informal situations and cases where the speaker is older than, a superior of, or very familiar with the named individual. When addressing someone or referring to a member of one's out-group, a respectful title such as -san (さん) is typically added. Calling someone's name (family name) without any title or honorific is called yobisute (呼び捨て), and may be considered rude even in the most informal and friendly occasions. This faux pas, however, is readily excused for foreigners.

Japanese people often avoid referring to their seniors or superiors by name at all. Rather, it is considered more respectful to address one who is considered a social superior by their title. Similarly to Western cultures, one would not address their mother by their name, but perhaps as okāsan (お母さん, "mother"); however, this readily extends outside the family circle as well. A teacher would be addressed as sensei (先生, "teacher"), while a company president would be addressed as shachō (社長, "company president").

Pronouns meaning "you" (anata (あなた), kimi (きみ), omae (お前)) are uncommon in Japanese, as when used improperly they may be perceived as being affrontive or sarcastic. It is more common for people to address each other by name/title and honorific, even in face-to-face conversations.

=== Nicknames ===
Any given name corresponds with one or more hypocoristics, or affectionate nicknames. These may be formed by adding the suffix -chan (ちゃん) to a name stem. There are two types of stem: the full given name or a modified stem derived from the full given name. Examples of the first type are Tarō-chan from Tarō, Kimiko-chan from Kimiko, and Yasunari-chan from Yasunari. Examples of the second type are Ta-chan from Tarō, Kii-chan from Kimiko, and Yā-chan from Yasunari. Hypocoristics with modified stems are considered more intimate than those based on the full given name.

Hypocoristics with modified stems are derived by adding -chan to a stem consisting of an integral number, usually one but occasionally two, of feet, where a foot consists of two moras. A mora (音節) is the unit of which a light syllable contains one and a heavy syllable two. For example, the stems that may be derived from Tarō are /taro/, consisting of two light syllables, and /taa/, consisting of a single syllable with a long vowel, resulting in Taro-chan and Tā-chan. The stems that may be derived from Hanako are /hana/, with two light syllables, /han/, with one syllable closed by a consonant, and /haa/, with one syllable with a long vowel, resulting in Hana-chan, Han-chan, and Hā-chan. The segmental content is usually a left substring of that of the given name. However, in some cases it is obtained by other means, including the use of another reading of the kanji used to write the name. For example, a girl named Megumi may be called Kei-chan or just Kei, because the character used to write Megumi (恵), can also be read Kei.

The common Japanese practice of forming abbreviations by concatenating the first two morae of two words is sometimes applied to names (usually those of celebrities). For example, Takuya Kimura (木村 拓哉, Kimura Takuya), a famous Japanese actor and singer, becomes Kimutaku (キムタク). Yukari Tamura (田村 ゆかり, Tamura Yukari) a Japanese voice actress and singer, becomes fans in Japan by the nickname Yukarin (ゆかりん). This is sometimes applied even to non-Japanese celebrities: Brad Pitt, whose full name remains the same in Japanese as Brad Pitt (ブラッド・ピット) is commonly known as BraPi (ブラピ), and Jimi Hendrix is abbreviated as Jimihen (ジミヘン). Some Japanese celebrities have also taken names combining kanji and katakana, such as Terry Ito (テリー伊藤). Another slightly less common method is doubling one or two syllables of the person's name, such as the use of "MamiMami" for Mamiko Noto.

=== Married names ===
Japanese law does not recognize married couples who have different surnames as lawful husband and wife. According to 2019 data, 95.5% of women took their husband's surname upon marriage. The constitutionality of this law has been challenged in court.

== Names from other ethnic groups in Japan ==
Many ethnic minorities living in Japan, mostly Korean and Chinese, adopt Japanese names. The roots of this custom go back to the colonial-era policy of sōshi-kaimei, which forced Koreans to change their names to Japanese names. Nowadays, ethnic minorities, mostly Korean, who immigrated to Japan after WWII take on Japanese names as legal aliases (通称名, tsūshōmei; lit. 'pass name') to ease communication and, more importantly, to avoid discrimination. A few of them (e.g., Han Chang-Woo, founder and chairman of Maruhan Corp., pronounced 'Kan Shōyū' in Japanese) still keep their native names.

Japanese citizenship used to require adoption of a Japanese name. In recent decades, the government has allowed individuals to simply adopt katakana versions of their native names when applying for citizenship, as is already done when referring to non-East Asian foreigners: National Diet member Tsurunen Marutei (ツルネン マルテイ), originally 'Martti Turunen', who is Finnish, is a famous example. Others transliterate their names into phonetically similar kanji compounds, such as activist Arudou Debito (有道 出人), an American-Japanese activist known as 'David Aldwinckle' before taking Japanese citizenship. (Tsurunen has similarly adopted 弦念 丸呈.) Still others have abandoned their native names entirely in favor of Yamato names, such as Lafcadio Hearn (who was half Anglo-Irish and half Greek), who used the name Koizumi Yakumo (小泉 八雲). At the time, to gain Japanese citizenship, it was necessary to be adopted by a Japanese family (in Hearn's case, it was his wife's family) and take their name.

Individuals born overseas with Western given names and Japanese surnames are usually given a katakana name in Western order ([given name] [surname]) when referred to in Japanese. Eric Shinseki, for instance, is still referred to as Eric Shinseki (エリック シンセキ), opting to use the native script in rendering his name. However, sometimes Japanese parents decide to use Japanese order when mentioning the child's name in Japanese. Also, Japanese parents tend to give their children a name in kanji, hiragana, or katakana, particularly if it is a Japanese name. Even individuals born in Japan, with a Japanese name, might be referred to using katakana if they have established residency or a career overseas. Yoko Ono, for example, was born in Japan, with the name 小野 洋子, and spent the first twenty years of her life there. However, having lived outside the country for more than fifty years, and basing her career in the United States, Ono is often referred to in the press as オノ・ヨーコ, preserving the Japanese order of her name (Ono Yōko), but rendering it in katakana. Another example is the inventor of Bitcoin, who has gone under the name Satoshi Nakamoto, and which is most likely a pseudonym, perhaps even of a non-Japanese person; Nakamoto is referred to in Japanese with katakana in Western order, サトシ・ナカモト, rather than 中本聡.

Christians in Japan traditionally have Christian names in addition to their native Japanese names. These Christian names are written using katakana, and are adapted to Japanese phonology from their Portuguese or Latin forms rather than being borrowed from English. Peter, for example, is Petoro (ペトロ), John is Yohane (ヨハネ), Jacob is Yakobu (ヤコブ), Martin is Maruchino (マルチノ), Dominic is Dominiko (ドミニコ), and so on. For most purposes in real life, Christian names are not used; for example, Taro Aso has a Christian name, Francisco (フランシスコ, Furanshisuko), which is not nearly as well-known. 16th century kirishitan daimyō Dom Justo Takayama, on the other hand, is far more well known by his Christian name Justo (ジュスト) than his birth name, Hikogorō Shigetomo.

== Imperial names ==
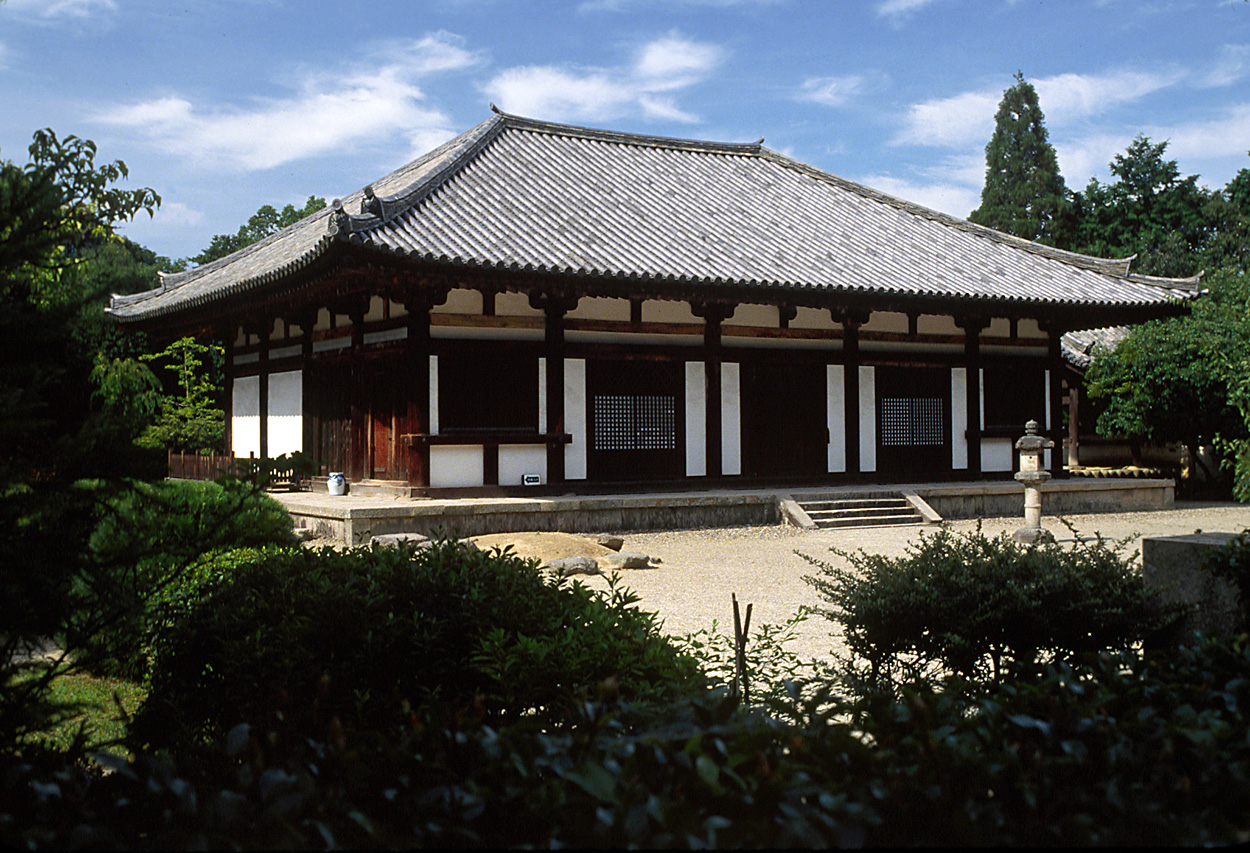
Akishino-dera in Nara, from which Prince Akishino took his name

For historical reasons, the Japanese emperor and his families do not have a surname and possess only a given name, such as Hirohito (裕仁). However, Japanese people prefer to say "the Emperor" or "the Crown Prince", rather than using the personal name out of respect and as a measure of politeness.

When children are born into the Imperial family, they receive a standard given name as well as a special title. For instance, the Emperor emeritus Akihito was born Tsugu-no-miya Akihito (継宮明仁). In this name, the title is Tsugu-no-miya (継宮, "Prince Tsugu"), and he was referred to as "Prince Tsugu" during his childhood. This title is generally used until the individual becomes heir to the throne or inherits one of the historical princely family names (Hitachi-no-miya (常陸宮), Mikasa-no-miya (三笠宮), Akishino-no-miya (秋篠宮), etc.).

When a member of the Imperial family becomes a noble or a commoner, the emperor gives them a family name. In medieval era, the family name "Minamoto" was often used. In modern era, princely family names are used. For example, many members of the extended Imperial family became commoners after World War II and adopted their princely family names minus the honorific -no-miya (宮, "Prince") as regular surnames. Conversely, if a commoner or a noble were to become a member of the Imperial family, such as through marriage, their family name is lost. An example is Empress Michiko, whose name was Michiko Shōda before she married Prince Akihito.

== Historical names ==
The current structure (family name + given name) did not materialize until the 1870s, when the Japanese government created the new family registration system.

In feudal Japan, names reflected a person's social status, as well as their affiliation with Buddhist, Shintō, feudatory-military, Confucian-scholarly, mercantile, peasant, slave, and imperial orders. Using the example of Oda Nobunaga:

Surname (氏/本姓, uji/honsei)	Kabane (姓)	Family name (苗字, myōji)	Title/Rank (官位, kan'i)	Pen name (仮名, kemyō)	Given name (諱, imina)	Childhood name (幼名, yōmyō)
平 Taira	朝臣 Ason	織田 Oda	上総介 Kazusa no suke	三郎 Saburo	信長 Nobunaga	吉法師 Kipposhi

Oda Nobunaga could thus be called 上総介三郎 (Kazusa-no-suke Saburo) when writing letters. This name is known as his 姓名 (seimei) or 字 (azana). More officially he was called 平信長 (Taira Nobunaga) as appears in 公卿補任 (kugyō-bunin), the list of nobility names. To use another example, Ashikaga Takauji's unabbreviated name was 源朝臣足利又太郎尊氏 (Minamoto Ason Ashikaga Mata-tarou Takauji), but he used the name 源尊氏 (Minamoto no Takauji) in a letter to the Chinese emperor.

Before feudal times, Japanese clan names figured prominently in history. Names with no fall into this category. The Japanese particle no can be translated as 'of', and is similar in usage to the German aristocratic von, although the association is in the opposite order in Japanese, and is not generally explicitly written in this style of name. Thus, Minamoto no Yoritomo (源 頼朝) was Yoritomo (頼朝) of the Minamoto (源) clan. Fujiwara no Kamatari (藤原 鎌足), Ki no Tsurayuki (紀 貫之), and Taira no Kiyomori (平 清盛) are additional examples. These family names were recorded in the Shinsen Shōjiroku. The Ryukyuan ruling class used names composed of Chinese characters, usually of one or two syllables and read in their own languages, like Korean and Chinese names.

Before the government formalized the naming system in 1868, Japanese personal names were fluid. Men changed their names for a variety of reasons: to signify that they had attained a higher social status, to demonstrate their allegiance to a house or clan, to show that they had succeeded to the headship of a family or company, to shed bad luck that was attached to an inauspicious name, or simply to avoid being mistaken for a neighbor with a similar name. Upper-class men often changed their names upon coming of age (genpuku), leaving behind their childhood name (which often ended with -maru) and taking on an adult name. When nobles and samurai received promotions in rank, they received new names, which might contain a syllable or character from their lord's name as a mark of favor.

Changes in women's personal names were recorded less often, so they may not have changed their names as frequently as men did, but women who went into service as maids or entertainers frequently changed their names for the duration of their service. During their employment, their temporary names were treated as their legal names. For example, a maid who was involved in legal dealings in Kyoto in 1819–1831 signed legal documents as Sayo during one period of employment and as Mitsu during a later period of employment, but she signed as Iwa, presumably her birth name, when she was between jobs.

At least until the Kamakura Period, women's names were often descriptive in nature, while their personal names would rarely be used in public. This was especially prominent in higher class and Imperial Court. An example is Murasaki Shikibu, whose name "Shikibu" is not the equivalent to a surname, but refers to Shikibu-shō, the Ministry of Ceremonials where Murasaki's father was employed. "Murasaki", an additional name possibly derived from the color violet associated with wisteria, the meaning of the word fuji (an element of her clan name), may have been bestowed on her at court in reference to the name she herself had given to the main female character in Genji. Another example is Kenreimon-in, wife and empress to Emperor Takakura. Kenreimon-in, which was not her personal name, refers to her residence, located by the Kenreimon Gate in the Kyoto Imperial Palace.

A Japanese person could go by one of several names, depending on the occasion. For example, the 18th-century author, poet, and artist Iwase Samuru wrote under the name Santō Kyōden and worked as an illustrator under the name Kitao Masanobu. Artists and authors adopted a new name for each medium or form they worked in, whether or not they worked professionally. Some types of artistic names (gō (号)) were referred to by special terminology—for example, haigō or haimei for a haiku poet, and kagō for a waka poet. Scholars also gave themselves scholarly names, often using the Chinese reading of the characters of their Japanese name. People who entered religious orders adopted religious names.

Death added to the number of a person's names. When a person died, their personal name was referred to as an imina (諱) and was no longer used. Instead, the person was referred to by their posthumous name (諡, okurina).

The personal names of Japanese emperors were also referred to as imina, even if the emperor was alive. Prior to Emperor Jomei, the imina of the emperors were very long and not used. The number of characters in each name diminished after Jomei's reign.

Azana (字), which is given at genpuku (元服), is used by others and one himself uses his real name to refer to him. Gō are commonly named after places or houses; e.g., Bashō, as in the haiku poet Matsuo Bashō (松尾 芭蕉), is named after his house, Bashō-an (芭蕉庵).

In the late shogunate period, many anti-government activists used several false names to hide their activities from the shogunate. Examples are Saidani Umetarō (才谷 梅太郎) for Sakamoto Ryōma (坂本 龍馬), Niibori Matsusuke (新堀 松輔) for Kido Takayoshi (木戸 孝允) and Tani Umenosuke (谷 梅之助) for Takasugi Shinsaku (高杉 晋作). The famous writer Kyokutei Bakin (曲亭 馬琴) is known to have had as many as 33 names.

== Professional names ==
Actors and actresses in Western and Japanese dramatic forms, comedians, sumo wrestlers, Western-style professional wrestlers, and practitioners of traditional crafts often use professional names. Many stage names of television and film actors and actresses are unremarkable, being just like ordinary Japanese personal names, but a few are tongue-in-cheek. For example, Kamatari Fujiwara (藤原 釜足) chose the name of the aforementioned founder of the Fujiwara family, while the name of Hino Yōjin (日野 陽仁) sounds like "be careful with fire" (although written differently). Many stand-up comics like the duo Beat Takeshi and Beat Kiyoshi choose a Western name for the act and use their own (or stage) given names. Writers also tend to be clever about their names, for example Edogawa Ranpo which is designed to sound like "Edgar Allan Poe".

Sumo wrestlers take wrestling names called shikona (醜名) or 四股名. While a shikona can be the wrestler's own surname, most upper-division rikishi have a shikona different from their surname. A typical shikona consists of two or three kanji, rarely just one or more than three. Often, part of the name comes from the wrestler's master, a place name (such as the name of a province, a river, or a sea), the name of a weapon, an item identified with Japanese tradition (like a koto or nishiki-ori), or a term indicating superiority. Often, waka indicates a wrestler whose father was also in sumo; in this case, the meaning is "junior".

Wrestlers can change their shikona, as Takahanada did when he became Takanohana (貴ノ花) and then Takanohana (貴乃花). Another notable example is the wrestler Sentoryu, which means "fighting war dragon" but is also homophonous with St. Louis, his city of origin.

Geisha, maiko and practitioners of traditional crafts and arts such as pottery, the tea ceremony, calligraphy, irezumi (tattooing) and ikebana (flower arranging) often take professional names, known as geimei (lit. 'art name'). In many cases, these come from the master under whom they studied. For geisha, these names often feature the first part of the name of their "older sister", and typically all the geisha registered to one okiya share this aspect in their names (such as Ichiume, Ichigiku, Ichiteru, etc.).

Kabuki actors take one of the traditional surnames such as Nakamura (中村), Bandō or Onoe. Some names are inherited on succession, such as that of the famous kabuki actor Bandō Tamasaburō V (五代目 坂東 玉三郎, Godaime Bandō Tamasaburō) through a naming ceremony.

Women working in the red-light districts commonly took names as a form of anonymity. However, high-ranking courtesans could inherit a generational name (名跡, myōseki) upon gaining promotion to a higher rank. These names, exclusively the property of the brothel owner, typically carried the prestige of the person who held it previously, and brothel owners commonly chose only those of similar countenance and reputation to inherit them. Myōseki were written in kanji, and were typically more elaborate than the average woman's name of the time, holding meanings taken from poetry, literary history and nature. As they were property of the brothel owner, myōseki were rarely passed from one oiran directly down to their apprentice, as holders were chosen for their suitability to the name's reputation.

== In English and other Western languages ==
In English, the names of modern Japanese after the Meiji era are generally given surname last and without macrons. Historical figures are given surname first and with macrons, if available.

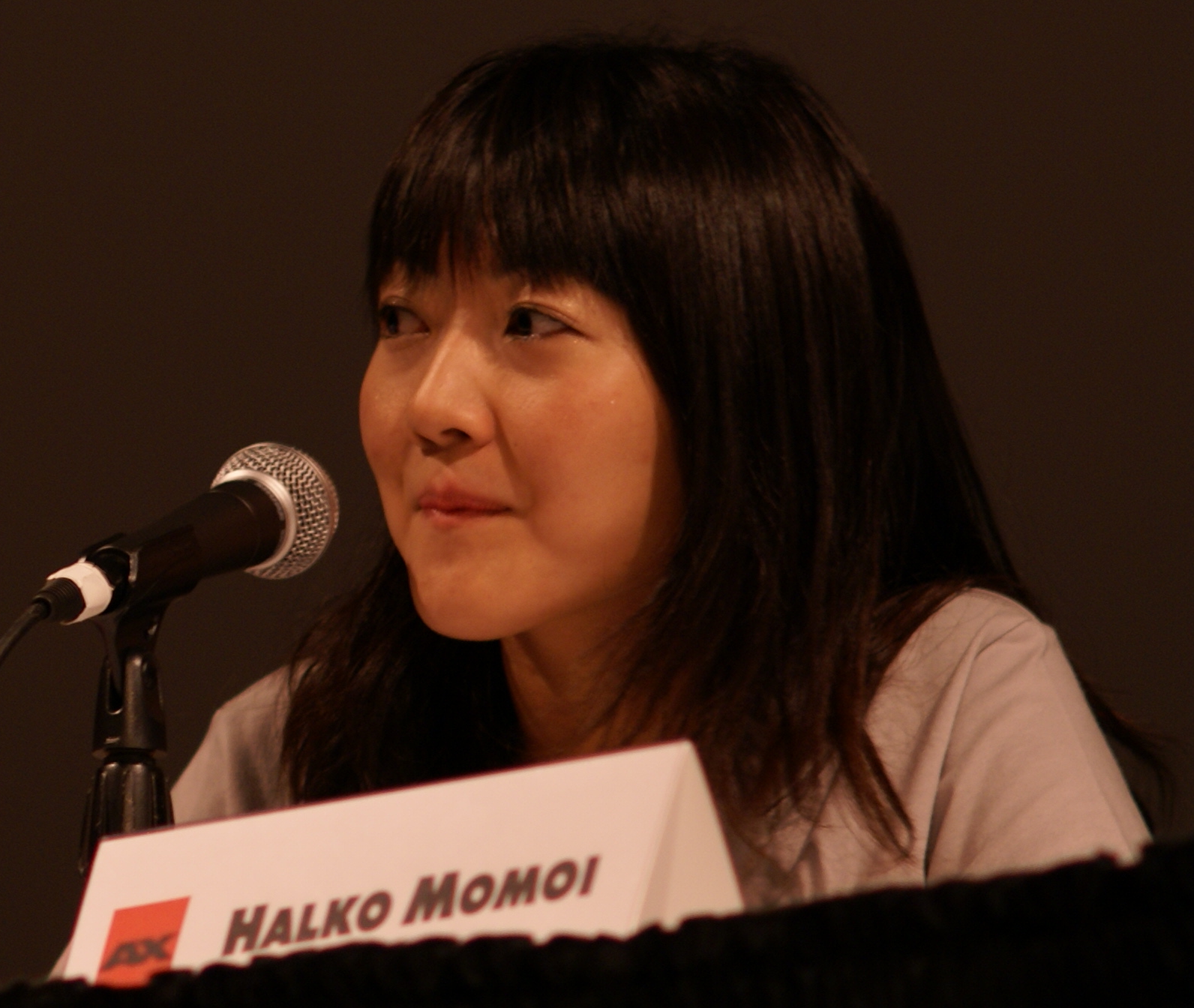
Haruko Momoi at the Anime Expo 2007 in Los Angeles; her name card features a spelling of her name ("Halko Momoi") written surname last. In Japanese, her name is Momoi Haruko (桃井はるこ).

As of 2008, when using English and other Western languages, Japanese people usually give their names in an order reversed from the traditional Japanese naming order, with the family name after the given name, instead of the given name after the family name. Beginning in Meiji period Japan, in many English-language publications, the naming order of modern-day Japanese people was reversed into the family name last order. The adoption of a Western naming order by Japanese people when writing or speaking in European languages, and when attending Western style or international events such as balls, formed part of the wider Meiji period adoption of aspects of Western culture in efforts to present Japan as a country as developed and advanced as its global neighbours.

This also affects some Japanese company names when their English business names are reversed compared to their original names, such as Sumitomo Mitsui which is spelled in Japanese as Mitsui Sumitomo (三井住友).

Japanese people often have nicknames that are shortened forms of their actual names, and sometimes use these names with foreigners for ease of understanding. For instance, a man named "Kazuyuki" may call himself "Kaz" in the presence of those for whom Japanese is not a first language. Some Japanese people living abroad also adopt nicknames that they use with friends who are not Japanese.

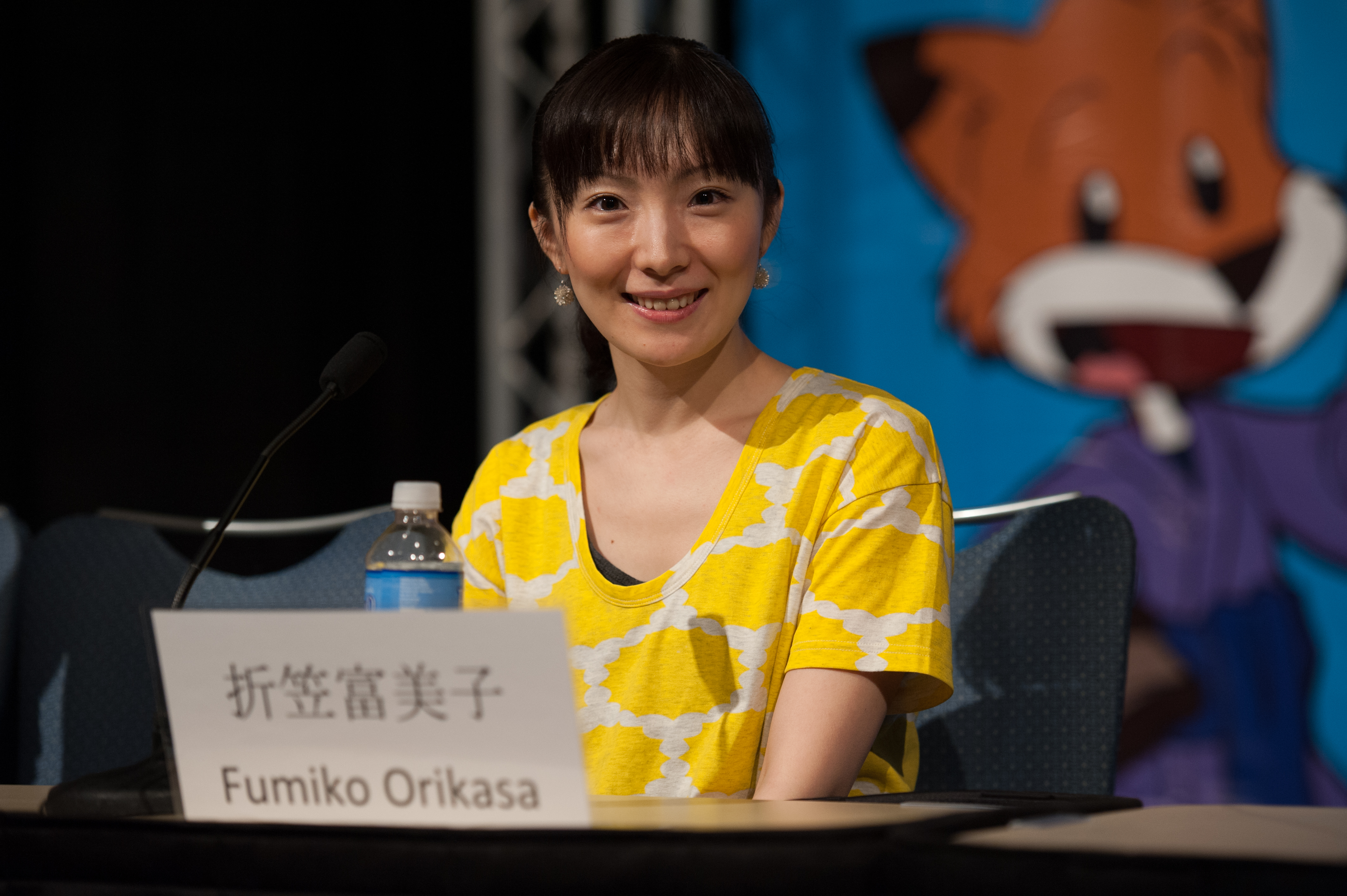
The nameplate of Fumiko Orikasa is presented family name first in Japanese, while it is presented given name first in English.

Most foreign publications reverse the names of modern Japanese people, and most Japanese people reverse their own names for materials or publications intended for foreign consumption; for example, a Japanese business executive or official usually has two business cards (meishi), the first presenting their name in the Japanese order for Japanese people, and the second presenting their name in the Western order, intended for foreigners. In popular journalism publications, the Western order of naming is used. These practices stand in stark contrast to how English and generally Western names are treated in the Japanese language, where they are typically presented without reordering.

In Russian, Russian names may be written with family name first and given name second, as well as the other way round, and this applies to Japanese names presented in Russian as well.

In English, many historical figures are still referred to with the family name first. This is especially the case in scholarly works about Japan. Many scholarly works use the Japanese order with Japanese names in general, and a scholarly work is more likely to use Japanese order if the author specialises in subjects related to or about Japan. John Power wrote that "People who can speak and read Japanese have a strong resistance to switching Japanese names to the Western order." Books written by these authors often have notes stating that Japanese names are in the original order. Some books, however, do not have consistent naming order practices. Shizuka Saeki of Look Japan said, "This is not only a headache for writers and translators, it is also a source of confusion for readers." Lynne E. Riggs of the Society of Writers, Editors and Translators (SWET), a professional writing organization headquartered in Tokyo, wrote that "When you publish a book about Japan, you are publishing it for people who want to know about Japan. So they are interested in learning something new or something as it is supposed to be."

Edith Terry wrote that because Japanese people are "mastering" a "Western game", people have some pride and at the same time feel insecurity because the "game" is on "Western terms" rather than "Japanese terms." The standard presentation of Japanese names in English differs from the standard presentations of modern Chinese names and Korean names, which are usually not reversed to fit the Western order in English, except when the person is living or traveling abroad. Power wrote that the difference between the treatment of Japanese names and of Chinese and Korean names often results in confusion. Terry wrote, "it was one of the ironies of the late twentieth century that Japan remained stranded in the formal devices underlining its historical quest for equality with the West, while China set its own terms, in language as in big-power politics."

Saeki wrote in 2001 that most Japanese people writing in English use the Western naming order, but that some figures had begun to promote the use of Japanese order as Japan became a major economic power in the 20th century. The Japan Style Sheet, a 1998 guide for producing English language works about Japan written by SWET, advocates the use of the Japanese naming order as often as possible, in order to promote a consistency in naming order. In 1987, one publisher of English language textbooks in Japan used the Japanese order of naming, while in 2001 six of the eight publishers of English language textbooks in Japan used the Japanese order. In December 2000, the council on the National Language of the Ministry of Education, Science, Sports and Culture recommended that English language productions begin using the Japanese naming order, as "it is in general desirable that personal names be presented and written in a way that preserves their unique forms, except for registries and other documents with specific standards." It recommended using capitalization (YAMADA Taro) or commas (Yamada, Taro) to clarify which part of the personal name is the family name and which part is the given name. In a January 2000 opinion poll from the Agency for Cultural Affairs on the preferred order of Japanese names in the English language, 34.9% had a preference for Japanese order, 30.6% had a preference for Western order, and 29.6% had no preference. In 1986, the Japan Foundation decided that it would use the Japanese naming order in all of its publications. A Japan Foundation publishing division spokesperson stated around 2001 that some SWET publications, including popular anglophone newspapers, continue to use the Western order. As of 2001, the agency's style sheet recommends using a different naming order style depending upon the context. For instance, it advocates using the Western order in publications for readers who are not familiar with Japan, such as international conference papers.

The Chicago Manual of Style recommends indexing Japanese names according to the way the original text treats the name. If the text uses the Western order, the Japanese name is reinverted and indexed by the family name with a comma. If the text uses Japanese order, the name is listed by the family name with no inversion and no comma.

KONO Taro
(@konotaromp)
tweeted:

If you can write

Moon Jae-in and Xi Jinping in correct order, you can surely write

Abe Shinzo the same way.

2 September 2020

On 21 May 2019, Japanese Foreign Minister Tarō Kōno expressed his hope that foreign media would refer to then-Prime Minister Shinzō Abe in the Japanese custom: family name first (as "Abe Shinzō"). He added that he was currently planning to issue an official request to the international media in that respect. He had criticized Western publications who had not done so, stating that "If you can write Moon Jae-in and Xi Jinping in correct order, you can surely write Abe Shinzo the same way." At the time, there were private Japanese journalism concerns and journalism concerns of other East Asian countries which continued to reverse Japanese names into Western order in European languages. Shannon Tiezzi of The Diplomat stated that the continued usage of Western order was "merely the inertia of style guides everywhere" instead of "a case of cultural arrogance on the part of Westerners". Some others in the government support moving to retaining the original order of names, in line with Chinese and Korean practice, in time for the several major global events the country will be host to during 2020, while others seem not to. In 2019 Yoshihide Suga continued to use Western order, citing "long-held practice".

On September 6, 2019, officials from the Ministry of Education, Culture, Sports, Science and Technology (MEXT) announced that the ministry was to start using the traditional order for Japanese names in English in official documents. In 2020, The Economist announced plans to begin writing Japanese names in Japanese order based on a Japanese government decree that had been issued. The Diplomat began using eastern order for persons in the Japanese government while, for non-government individuals, using the naming orders they choose. NHK World-Japan began using Japanese names surname-first (with some exceptions) as early as March 29, 2020, but the new policy regarding name order was only announced early the next day.

In events of Olympics, athletes of Japan were previously displayed in the Western order on TV on-screen graphics, such as "Yuzuru HANYU", due to Japan was not in the Use and rules of each participant name > TV Name “Switching” in the document Language Guidelines & Participant Names of the Olympic Data Feed, which has included China and South Korea before, until PyeongChang 2018. Since Tokyo 2020, Japan has requested their names be displayed in the Eastern order such as "HANYU Yuzuru", by being added to the list of countries in TV Name “Switching”. This also has applied for Asiad since Hangzhou 2022. However, this does not apply to or bind competitions organized by international sports federations, such as the FIFA World Cup.

== In Chinese ==
In Chinese-speaking communities, Japanese names are pronounced according to the Chinese pronunciations of the kanji. For example, in Standard Mandarin, Yamada Tarō (山田 太郎) becomes Shāntián Tàiláng, while Hatoyama Yukio (鳩山 由紀夫) becomes Jiūshān Yóujìfū. As a result, a Japanese person without adequate knowledge of Chinese would not understand their name when it is spoken in Chinese languages. Simply porting the kanji into Chinese and reading them as if they were Chinese is also different from the usual Chinese practice of approximating foreign names with similar-sounding Chinese characters.

Sometimes, a Japanese name includes kokuji. These kanji resemble Chinese characters but originate in Japan and do not have widely known Chinese pronunciations. For example, the word komu (込), read as yū in Chinese) is rarely used in modern Chinese reading. When words like this are encountered, usually the rule of "有邊讀邊，沒邊讀中間" ("read the side if any, read the middle part if there is no side") applies. Therefore, "込" is read as rù which is derived from 入.

Heng Ji wrote that because Japanese names have "flexible" lengths, it may be difficult for someone to identify a Japanese name when reading a Chinese text. When consulting English texts a Chinese reader may have difficulty identifying a Japanese name; an example was when Chinese media mistook Obama's pet turkey Abe taken from Abe Lincoln (monosyllabic) for Shinzo Abe (disyllabic).

One place where Japanese names may be transliterated into Chinese languages phonetically is in Japanese video games, anime and manga series. In May 2016, Nintendo sparked anger among fans in Hong Kong by announcing that its new Pokémon games, Sun and Moon, would use translations based upon Mandarin across all parts of China and Taiwan. As the variety of Chinese spoken in Hong Kong, Cantonese, has many phonological differences from Mandarin, this results in names of well-known characters such as Pikachu being rendered and pronounced much different from the original Japanese.

== See also ==
- List of Japanese unisex given names
- List of Japanese feminine given names
- List of Japanese masculine given names
- List of most common Japanese family names
- Onomastics
- Amami name
- Art-name
- Japanese alias
- Meishi
- Okinawan family name
- Chinese name
- Korean name
- Vietnamese name

== Bibliography ==
- Power, John. "Japanese names." (Archive) The Indexer. June 2008. Volume 26, Issue 2, p. C4-2-C4-8 (7 pages).doi:10.3828/indexer.2008.29. ISSN 0019-4131. Accession number 502948569.
- Some materials taken from Kodansha Encyclopedia of Japan, article on "names"
