= Mutō =

Mutō (武藤 "warrior wisteria") is a Japanese surname. It is also romanized as Muto, Mutoh, or Mutou.

Notable people with the surname include:

- Adam Muto, American animator
- Akira Mutō, chief of staff of the 14th Area Army
- Ayami Mutō, singer
- Azumi Muto, actress
- Chiharu Muto (武藤 千春, born 1995), Japanese businesswoman
- Kaneyoshi Muto, Japanese fighter ace in World War II
- Hideki Mutoh, race car driver in the Super GT series
- Joe Muto, television producer
- Keiji Muto, pro-wrestler
- Luke Kenichi Muto, Japanese Anglican bishop
- Masatoshi Muto, Japanese diplomat
- Michiko Toyama Muto, American composer
- Nobuyoshi Mutō, general
- Toshiro Muto, Deputy Governor, Bank of Japan
- Tomu Muto, former AKB48 member
- Yoshinori Muto, football player
- Yoshitaka Muto (武藤 好貴, born 1987), Japanese baseball player
- Yuki Muto (武藤 雄樹, born 1988), Japanese footballer

Fictional characters include:

- Akio Mutou, science teacher in the visual novel Katawa Shoujo
- Ashirogi Muto of Bakuman
- Kaname Muto of Yahiko no Sakabato
- Kazuki Muto of Buso Renkin
- Kenji, Shizuka, and Yuki Muto of Lian Hearn's Tales of the Otori trilogy
- Nobuyushi Muto
- Rikako Muto, female lead from the anime Ocean Waves
- Yugi and Sugoroku Mutou of Yu-Gi-Oh!
- MUTO, an acronym for "Massive Unidentified Terrestrial Organism", a species of kaiju in the 2014 film Godzilla

== See also ==
- Mutou Valley, valley in the Flaming Mountains, China
- Mutoh Europe nv, electronics company
- Dr. Muto, video game
