= David Eisho Uehara =

Japanese Anglican bishop

The Most Reverend David Eisho Uehara
- Primate of Nippon Sei Ko Kai; Bishop of Okinawa
- Province: Anglican Church in Japan
- Diocese: Okinawa
- In office: 2024–present
- Predecessor: Luke Kenichi Muto

Orders
- Consecration: September 7, 2013 by Nathaniel Makoto Uematsu

David Eisho Uehara is a Japanese Anglican bishop. Since 2013, he has been bishop of Okinawa, and since 2024, he has been the 20th primate of the Nippon Sei Ko Kai, the province of the Anglican Communion in Japan.

== Biography ==
Prior to becoming bishop of Okinawa, Uehara was rector of the Anglican cathedral in Okinawa, and he chaired the standing committee of the Diocese of Okinawa.

Uehara was elected as primate during NSKK's May 2024 synod and installed on May 30, 2024.

== See also ==
- Anglican Church in Japan
- Anglican Communion

Anglican Communion titles
Preceded by Luke Kenichi Muto	Primate of the Nippon Sei Ko Kai; Since 2024	Incumbent
Preceded by David Shoji Tani	Bishop of Okinawa; Since 2013	Incumbent
