= Shindo =

Shindo or Shindō may refer to:

- Japan Meteorological Agency seismic intensity scale (震度, shindo)
- Shindo (religion) (신도), an alternative name of Korean Shamanism used by Shamanic associations in modern South Korea.

== People ==
- Shindō (surname)
- T.K. Shindo (1890-1974), Japanese photographer
- xyshindo, Indian artist

== Other uses ==
- Shindō (manga) (神童), a Japanese manga by Akira Sasō (1998), film and novel by Koji Hagiuda (2007)
- "Shindo", a song by Less Than Jake on the 1996 album Losing Streak
- Rumble Pak (振動パック (Shindō pakku)), a Nintendo 64 peripheral that provides haptic feedback
  - The "Shindou version" of Super Mario 64 (abbreviated from スーパーマリオ64 振動パック対応バージョン (Sūpā Mario 64 shindō pakku taiō bājion), lit. 'Super Mario 64 Vibration Pack Compatible Version'), a 1997 rerelease of the game that added Rumble Pak support and fixed various glitches, most notably the backwards long jump
