= Shindō (surname) =

Shindō, Shindo or Shindou (written: 新藤, 進藤, 信藤, 真堂) is a Japanese surname. Notable people with the surname include:

- Amane Shindō (進藤 あまね; born 2004), Japanese voice actress and singer
- Charles J. Shindo, American academic
- Eitarō Shindō (進藤 英太郎; 1899–1977), Japanese actor
- Gaku Shindo (進藤 学; born 1980), Japanese actor and singer
- Kaneto Shindo (新藤 兼人; 1912–2012), Japanese film director, producer, screenwriter and writer
- Kei Shindō (真堂 圭; born 1984), Japanese voice actress
- Masaoki Shindo (眞藤 雅興; born 1998), Japanese manga artist
- Mitsuo Shindō (信藤 三雄; born 1948), Japanese art director and film director
- Naomi Shindō (進藤 尚美; born 1972), Japanese voice actress
- Tak Shindo (1922–2002), Japanese-American musician
- Yoko Shindo (真道 洋子, 1960–2018), Japanese archaeologist
- Yoshitaka Shindō (新藤 義孝; born 1958), Japanese politician
- Haruichi Shindō (新藤 晴一; born 1974), Japanese musician, guitarist, composer and lyricist

== Fictional characters ==
- Several characters in Hikaru no Go
- Risa Shindō of Battle Royale II: Requiem
- Shūichi Shindō of Gravitation
- Ranmaru and Saya Shindo of Tokko (manga)
- Mie Shindou, a fictional character from Strike Witches
- Nadeshiko Shindo, one of the minor characters from the anime and manga series Vampire Knight
- Mikaela Shindo, the former name of Mikaela Hyakuya, from the anime and manga series Seraph of the End/Owari no Seraph
- Erina Shindō, from the anime and manga series Gonna be the Twin-Tail!!
- Chrono Shindou, Mikuru Shindou and Rive Shindou, from the anime and manga Cardfight!! Vanguard G
- Ainosuke Shindo from the anime SK8 the Infinity
- Shoji Shindo from Initial D
- Jack Shindo from Ultraman: Towards the Future
