= An Atheist in the FOXhole =

2013 memoir by Joe Muto

- Author: Joe Muto
- Publisher: E. P. Dutton
- Publication date: 2013

An Atheist in the FOXhole: A Liberal's Eight-Year Odyssey Inside the Heart of the Right-Wing Media is a 2013 memoir by Joe Muto, a man with liberal political views who worked for Fox News for eight years, that was published by E. P. Dutton.

== Contents ==
Muto, a graduate of University of Notre Dame, started work at Fox as a production assistant and became an associate producer for Bill O'Reilly's show. He was fired due to leaking information to Gawker. Gawker paid him $5,000 for the material. Muto pleaded guilty to two misdemeanor charges: attempted computer tampering and attempted theft. He was sentenced to over 200 hours of community service and a fine of $1,000; he also gave up all of the funds Gawker paid him to the court.

The book switches back and forth between his firing and the chronology of his time at Fox. Calvin Terbeek of the Houston Press wrote that the initial parts of the book largely discusses the general management style of cable news, and that the Fox-specific content largely appears after Muto is brought on to Bill O'Reilly's program; according to Terbeek, the book focuses more on O'Reilly than on Sean Hannity.

The Associated Press stated that "His book isn't a diatribe, and is often funny. He knows there are stories some of his former colleagues won't like, but Muto is hard on himself, too." According to the AP, it has "a detailed character study of O'Reilly". Eric Deggans of the Tampa Bay Times stated that "media nerds" would find interest in the content about O'Reilly.

== Reception ==
Andrew Mueller of the New Humanist wrote that Muto is "a breezy, amiable storyteller who manages to turn a yarn that could easily have been a magazine article into an altogether readable book that rarely feels padded."

Nicky Woolf of the New Statesman argued that the book has few new revelations about Fox News figures, and that it was "insightful, if a little underwhelming."

Deggans wrote that "I found the middle sections a compelling, detailed look at how cable's top anchor chooses stories and develops his onscreen image."

Terbeek describes the book as "a liberal's beach book read: light, easy and mostly fun." He criticizes the author's attempts at humor within the book's first 75 pages. He argued that political conservatives may enjoy reading the book for gossip presented on Fox News personalities and on the information on how cable news networks are operated.
