= RuriDragon =

Japanese manga series

- First tankōbon volume cover, featuring Ruri Aoki

ルリドラゴン (Ruridoragon)
- Genre: Coming-of-age; Fantasy; Slice of life
- Manga
- Written by: Masaoki Shindo
- Published by: Shueisha
- English publisher: NA: Viz Media
- Imprint: Jump Comics
- Magazine: Weekly Shōnen Jump (Note: Since April 22, 2024, the manga is only serialized in the digital version of Weekly Shōnen Jump.); (June 13, 2022 – present); Shōnen Jump+; (April 22, 2024 – present)
- Original run: June 13, 2022 – present
- Volumes: 5
- Anime television series
- Studio: Kyoto Animation
- icon

RuriDragon (Japanese: ルリドラゴン, Hepburn: Ruridoragon) is a Japanese web manga series written and illustrated by Masaoki Shindo. It was originally a one-shot published in Shueisha's Jump Giga magazine in December 2020, before being serialized in Weekly Shōnen Jump starting in June 2022. Following an 18-month hiatus, the series was moved to Weekly Shōnen Jump's digital version and the Shōnen Jump+ service in April 2024. Its chapters have been collected into five tankōbon volumes as of March 2026. An anime television series adaptation produced by Kyoto Animation has been announced.

== Premise ==
Ruri Aoki wakes up one day and notices that horns started growing from her head. When asked about it, her mother reveals that she is actually a half-dragon. Despite this revelation, Ruri tries to continue living a normal life, though it is more challenging than she thought.

== Characters ==
=== Kuromata High School students ===
Ruri Aoki (青木 瑠璃, Aoki Ruri)
Voiced by: Chiaki Omigawa (voice comic)
A dragon-human hybrid first-year high school girl in Class 1-3 who is struggling to cope with sudden physical changes as her dragon half matures. Her inherited dragon traits (inherent characteristics) and abilities (active actions) so far include growing horns, breathing fire, discharging lightning, spitting up venom, daemonfire, and frost.
Yuka Hagiwara (萩原 裕香, Hagiwara Yuka)
Voiced by: Megumi Haruki (2021 voice comic), Miko Tateishi (2022 voice comic)
Ruri's longtime friend with whom she walks to school. She wears her blonde hair in a short bob.
Airi Kashiro (神代 藍莉, Kashiro Airi)
Voiced by: Marin Aoki (2022 voice comic)
A new, cheerful friend who helps Ruri with schoolwork. She wears her multicolored hair in two pigtails.
Ryunosuke Yoshioka (吉岡 琉之助, Yoshioka Ryūnosuke)
Voiced by: Yoshihito Hashimoto (2022 voice comic)
A boy whose hair falls victim to Ruri's first breath of fire. He runs the anchor leg of the relay race.
Homura Kagami (賀上 炎, Kagami Homura)
A boy with blonde hair who jokes Ruri is a biological weapon. She promises to take him for a ride if she learns to fly. He runs the first leg of the relay race for Class 1–3.
Kana Miyashita (宮下 佳奈, Miyashita Kana)
Voiced by: Maiko Akahoshi (2022 voice comic)
One of Ruri's study buddies in Kashiro's group.
Asuka Mikura (三倉 明日香, Mikura Asuka)
One of Ruri's study buddies in Kashiro's group.
Akari Maeda (前田 赤里, Maeda Akari)
Initially, she does not get along with Ruri because she thinks Ruri does not care about other people. Superficially, she resembles Hagiwara with blonde hair in a short bob, but her hair falls straighter. Maeda is a talented artist.
Yoru Kurosawa (黒沢 夜, Kurosawa Yoru)
A student from Class 1-3 who invites Ruri to go bowling with her group. She wears oval glasses and has shoulder-length hair.
Hinata Tazaki (田崎 日向, Tazaki Hinata)
She has longer blonde hair and also is in Ruri's class; she is one of the other bowlers.
Makoto Ryuzaki (竜崎 眞, Ryūzaki Makoto)
Student council vice-president.
Chikuma Kosaka (香坂 千曲, Kōsaka Chikuma)
Student council president.
Shiota (潮田)
A girl in Class 1-3 and aspiring mangaka who designs a logo for Sports Day. She wears her blonde bangs tied back.
Nakamura (中村)
Another first-year student who helped Ruri after her first attack with venom.
Sato (佐藤, Satō)
Another first-year student who joined the Sports Day planning committee, but lost his voice.
Kazuki Kume (久米 一樹, Kume Kazuki)
The Athletics Council President and student in Class 3–1, he lacks tact.
Shigure Kariya (狩屋 時雨, Kariya Shigure)
Class 3–2, Student Council General Affairs
Kamata (蒲田)
One of the girls who tries to bully Ruri.
Shima (志摩)
A boy in Class 1-4 who asks Yoshioka to introduce him to Ruri if their class wins the relay race.
Sakuya Onizuka (鬼塚 咲夜, Onizuka Sakuya)
The "ice queen" student in Class 1-3 who runs the second leg of the relay race.
Kokoro Komichi (小路 心, Komichi Kokoro)
The flustered student in Class 1-3 who runs the third leg of the relay race.
Hideyoshi Sakuma (佐久間 秀吉, Sakuma Hideyoshi)
A muscular boy in Class 1-3 who anchors the tug-of-war team.
Mitsuki Mori (森 光貴, Mori Mitsuki)
A student in Class 1-3 who excels at the ball-basket event.
Koma Shinozaki (篠崎 こま, Shinozaki Koma)
A student in Class 1–5
Ringo Mizue (瑞江 りんご, Mizue Ringo)
A student in Class 1–5
Kurama (倉間)
A student who is surprisingly good at science, despite his attempts to be average at everything and avoid social relationships. He joins Airi's study group.

=== Adults ===
Umi Aoki (青木 海, Aoki Umi)
Voiced by: Maiko Akahoshi (2021 voice comic), Kaori Nazuka (2022 voice comic)
A single mom raising her dragon-human daughter, Umi is seemingly carefree but demonstrates her love for Ruri in her many acts of kindness.
Ruri's dad
Voiced by: Hikaru Fujikura (2021 voice comic)
A reclusive dragon who lives "deep in the mountains". He is proud of Ruri, but has not yet met her.
Takemoto (岳本)
Voiced by: Kōtarō Nozawa (2021 voice comic), Satoshi Inomata (2022 voice comic)
Ruri's Class 1-3 homeroom teacher who pushes her to participate more in school; his easygoing nature masks his undercover status as a human expert who is assigned to monitor Ruri.
Gunji (軍司)
The vice principal of Kuromata High School who gives a speech kicking off Sports Day.
Airu Kashiro (神代 愛瑠, Kashiro Airu)
Airi's older sister, a designer and part-time model who conceals her shyness behind a punk rock aesthetic. She says she has met a dragon before.
En (エン)
A tattooed man who guides Ruri through her first dragon encounter with Kuro.
Mikuni Kurotsuna
A young black dragon nicknamed Kuro (クロ) who is ashamed of losing control during growth spurts. He was discovered five years ago in the mountains of Yakushima.

=== Cats ===
The cats that live with En include:

- Tater Chip
- Plumbo

== Production ==
The initial ideas for RuriDragon were formed when Masaoki Shindo wanted to make a visual representation of the idea that "being different is interesting", following years of feeling that they were "different" from others. In writing the series, Shindo aimed for character dialogue that was "spoken naturally as opposed to being written" and also did not feel scripted nor "overly fictional". The author stated that they use the manga's fourth chapter as a reference during the writing process, noting it was when they realized the type of series that it is. RuriDragon's initial one-shot in Jump Giga received favorable reception, which led to the series being serialized in Weekly Shōnen Jump.

== Media ==
=== Manga ===
Written and illustrated by Shindo, RuriDragon was initially a one-shot published in Shueisha's Jump Giga magazine on December 28, 2020. It began serialization in Weekly Shōnen Jump on June 13, 2022. On August 1, 2022, Weekly Shōnen Jump announced that the series would go on indefinite hiatus due to Shindo's health. The first tankōbon volume was released on October 4, 2022. As of March 2026, five volumes have been released.

On February 21, 2024, it was announced that RuriDragon would resume its serialization, publishing five chapters in Weekly Shōnen Jump from March 4 to April 1, before moving to a biweekly schedule in the magazine's digital version and the Shōnen Jump+ service starting on April 22.

Viz Media and Shueisha's Manga Plus platform are publishing the series digitally in English. In May 2024, Viz Media announced that it would release the manga in print format; the first volume was published on January 7, 2025.

==== Volumes ====
No.	Title	Original release date	English release date
1	Actually a Dragon; Doragon Nandatte (ドラゴンなんだって)	October 4, 2022; 978-4-08-883285-2	January 7, 2025; 978-1-9747-3831-1
1. "It's Got Nothing to Do with the Horns" (ツノ関係ないじゃん, Tsuno Kankei Nai jan); 2. "See You at School" (また学校でね, Mata Gakkō de ne); 3. "Actually a Dragon" (ドラゴンなんだって, Doragon Nandatte); 4. "Starbucks Is Scary" (スタバ怖い, Sutaba Kowai); 5. "At Last, the Beast Is Slain" (やっと倒した, Yatto Taoshita); 6. "Can't Blame Her" (仕方ないよ, Shikatanai yo)
On an otherwise ordinary school day, Ruri Aoki wakes up to find horns growing out of her head; neither her mom, who admits her father is a dragon, nor her homeroom teacher make much of a fuss, despite her sudden and unusual popularity. Falling asleep after lunch in Modern Literature, she is punished by reading a passage aloud, but breathes fire while sneezing and spends the rest of the day in the nurse's office. Her mother picks her up after getting advice from her father. Ruri stays home while learning to control her flame breath under her mom's coaching, and is reluctantly dragged to school after a week's absence by her longtime friend Yuka Hagiwara. Although she dreads her classmates' reaction, they readily accept her half-human status after her mom visited the school while she was absent to explain Ruri's parentage. Ruri joins an after-school study session at Starbucks with a new friend, Airi Kashiro. During the first storm of rainy season, Ruri's next trait (electrostatic discharge) begins to develop.
2	Don't Need to Be Besties; Nakaii Hitsuyō Nain da yo (仲良い必要ないんだよ)	September 4, 2024; 978-4-08-884164-9	August 5, 2025; 978-1-9747-5606-3
7. "Dragon Crap" (ドラゴン絡み, Doragon-garami); 8. "To Play Hard" (遊びに来たんだよ, Asobi ni Kitanda yo); 9. "As Normal as Possible" (できる限りは普通のフリ, Dekiru Kagiri wa Futsū no Furi); 10. "Put It to Use" (使い道, Tsukaimichi); 11. "No Rest for High Schoolers" (高校生って多忙すぎない？, Kōkōsei tte Tabō Suginai?); 12. "Making Something Fun for Everyone" (自分がみんなを楽しませてるみたいで, Jibun ga Minna o Tanoshimaseteru Mitai de); 13. "Don't Need to Be Besties" (仲良い必要ないんだよ, Nakaii Hitsuyō Nain da yo); 14. "I Wanna Learn About You, Maeda" (前田さんのことが知りたい, Maeda-san no Koto ga Shiritai); 15. "Thanks for Waiting" (待っててくれてありがとう, Mattete Kurete Arigatō)
Ruri manages to control the electric discharge and calls her mom, who tells her dragons also can call lightning as one of nine traits. After class, Ruri is drafted into classroom cleanup with unfriendly Akari Maeda. The next day is a Saturday, so Ruri and her mom hang out at a sports complex to exercise; later, she goes bowling with classmates. Returning to school, the homeroom teacher, Mr. Takemoto, announces that Sports Day is coming soon and drafts Ruri to serve on the planning committee with Akari, who finally explains she dislikes Ruri because she doesn't care about other people. Kashiro, who has known Akari since middle school, says Maeda is bluntly honest; later, Akari and Ruri bond while discussing graphic design ideas for Sports Day and Ruri invites Maeda to eat lunch together. Prompted for more details, Akari flames Ruri, Yuka, and Kashiro; Ruri calmly explains that Akari simply has misjudged their character based on her assumptions without actually getting to know them. Akari helps Ruri stage equipment for Sports Day, and Ruri dashes off to another study session with Kashiro, who coaches Ruri to start saying "thank you" instead of apologizing for being so late.
3	Kinda Gross; Kimoi ne (キモいね)	March 4, 2025; 978-4-08-884415-2	March 3, 2026; 978-1-9747-6229-3
16. "The Upsides of Dragonhood" (ドラゴンになってよかったこと, Doragon ni Natte Yokatta Koto); 17. "Let's Draw Some Attention" (目立とうよ, Medatō yo); 18. "Get People to Know You" (みんなに知ってもらうこと, Minna ni Shitte Morau Koto); 19. "A NonHuman Substance" (人間が持たない成分, Ningen ga Motanai Seibun); 20. "That Isn't Very Nice" (そういうのよくないっすよ, Sō Iu no Yokunaissu yo); 21. "Nothing Wrong with Some Venom" (毒があっていい, Doku ga Atte Ii); 22. "A Direct Hit" (直撃みたい...です, Chokugeki Mitai... Desu); 23. "I'm a Dragon" (ドラゴンなんだから, Doragon Nanda kara); 24. "Kinda Gross" (キモいね, Kimoi ne)
At a second study session, Ruri realizes her circle of friends keeps growing; at the festival planning meeting, Akari and Ruri take over as the chair and vice chair for their grade, and Ruri's first task is to reintroduce and demystify herself to the entire school, starting with the third-year leaders. Ruri is stricken with sudden nausea and vomits, which Mr. Takemoto identifies as venom, her fourth dragon trait, then passes out. She confronts her teacher the next day, suspicious that he identified her barf so quickly, and he explains he was forewarned by her weekly blood tests. After Ruri hears some older girls disparaging her horns, she avoids their bullying but Akari steps up to defend her and they stage a prank in which Akari breaks Ruri's horns, as they do not realize they will simply grow back. When the school learns a typhoon will hit on Sports Day, Ruri volunteers to attempt to control the weather and bring the storm in sooner by discharging her lightning. She is encouraged after her class confesses to a plethora of perceptions, none of which cause them to fear her. Afterward, Ruri wins over one of her bullies by being honest and direct and Sports Day kicks off; at Akari's suggestion, the committee members have dressed up by wearing cardboard horns.
4	Wish I Could've Stayed Normal; Futsū na Mama de Itakatta (普通なままでいたかった)	November 4, 2025; 978-4-08-884538-8	September 1, 2026; 978-1-9747-6671-0
25. "Was This Always on the Menu?" (そんなのあったっけ？, Sonna no Attakke?); 26. "Is There a Matsuda from Class 4 Here?" (4組の松田さんいますか？, Yonkumi no Matsuda-san Imasu ka?); 27. "Barely Weighs a Thing" (何か重くない, Nanka Omokunai); 28. "Cold Karaage Is Nasty" (冷めたからあげって不味いよね, Sameta Karaage tte Mazui yo ne); 29. "Walk on Eggshells" (余計な気, Yokei na Ki); 30. "Aoki's Problem" (青木さんの問題, Aoki-san no Mondai); 31. "Wish I Could've Stayed Normal" (普通なままでいたかった, Futsū na Mama de Itakatta); 32. "On One Condition" (条件出します, Jōken Dashimasu); 33. "Turf" (ナワバリ, Nawabari)
Ruri steps up and addresses the whole school when Nakamura is too nervous. Shima of Class 1-1 forces Yoshioka to promise to introduce him to Ruri if they win the comic relay race. In a series of absurd challenges, Yoshioka brings Class 1-3 from last to first during the anchor leg while dragging a tire and riding a tricycle; in the final challenge, they run a race in outfits and when Shima trips in his maid costume, Yoshioka the bride returns to help, ending up in fifth place. Invited to lunch with skeptical Class 1-5, Ruri gets testy when they keep calling her "dragon". Afterward, she is exhausted during the scavenger hunt race, and proves her dragon nature by reheating and toasting food. Ruri begins to believe students hang out with her solely because she is half-dragon, and explodes in cold daemonfire flames, frustrated. Airi is nonchalant and exclaims that Ruri shouldn't have to act human if she is not human. Ruri douses her flames in the school pool and returns, soaking wet, where she runs the anchor leg of the closing relay race and collapses when the daemonfire flares up again. Although she finishes last, she hugs Airi and apologizes. Mr. Takemoto offers to let Ruri withdraw from school, but she chooses to continue and makes him promise he will prevent her from hurting anyone. Just before summer break, Ruri shows a new frost ability which allows her to lower the temperature of her surroundings. Mr. Takemoto explains that dragons can control their environment when claiming a territory to make it more comfortable for themselves.
5	I'm on Board; Nottarā (乗ったらぁ)	March 4, 2026; 978-4-08-884745-0	—
34. "The Ice Type" (氷属性, Kōri Zokusei); 35. "I Hate Not Getting Stuff" (解らないと腹が立つね, Wakaranai to Hara ga Tatsu ne); 36. "Good Job Cooking with Those Claws" (よくその爪で作れるな, Yoku Sono Tsume de Tsukureru na); 37. "Don't Go Roasting Marshmallows of Your Own Accord" (勝手にマシュマロとか焼かないでください, Katte ni Mashumaro toka Yakanaide Kudasai); 38. "Better to Have One Than Not" (あった方がよくない？, Atta Hō ga Yokunai?); 39. "The True Ending" (トゥルーエンドだな, Turū Endo da na); 40. "I'm on Board" (乗ったらぁ, Nottarā); 41. "We All Suck at Science" (ここ皆理科系弱いんだよね, Koko Minna Rikakei Yowai nda yo ne); 42. "I'm Also a Fan of Shadowkat" (カゲネコいいよね, Kageneko Ii yo ne); 43. "Leeep!" (てうっ, Teu)
At her mom's suggestion, Ruri blasts ice at the pool to exhaust her power. Ruri's study buddies invite her to a summer festival sleepover at Airi's house. The girls gossip late into the night; when Ruri asks her mom about her father, she says only two dragon individuals can interact with humans, and dragons eventually will destroy the world. Briefly depressed, Ruri cheers up after talking with her friends and announces the potential Armageddon to the class, since she feels her grip on humanity slipping, but adds the dragons have become sympathetic to humans because she represents the hope that humans and dragons will meet halfway. The other students prove welcoming and curious. Ruri promises not to bring Armageddon and her classmates wish that she stays enrolled. Mr. Takemoto assures her it went well and says that instead being demihuman ("half human") she now is considered "double" instead – more than either human or dragon alone. Yoshioka confides he initially thought Ruri should drop out after the fire-breathing incident to protect her emotions, pushing her to realize that she wants to stay in school. After further conversations, Ruri adds she will try to avoid further accidents and stay enrolled – as a human – as long as possible. She tells Kurama, a boy who sees himself as resolutely average, they have a lot in common and invites him to join Airi's study group to tutor the group in chemistry. Encouraged by their acceptance, he reaches out and makes summer plans with friends. Yano silently stews because his classmates have accepted Ruri; when he confronts her after school, demanding to know what dragons are, she invites him to walk home together so they can discuss what she knows.
6	— — (—)	December 4, 2026; 978-4-08-885095-5	—

==== Chapters not yet in tankōbon format ====
These chapters have yet to be published in a tankōbon volume.

44. "Gradation" (グラデーション, Guradēshon)
45. "We're Headed for Mount Ontake" (御嶽山の方に向かってもらえます？, Ontake-san no Hō ni Mukatte Moraemasu?)
46. "Quit Judging Your Past Self" (省みるのやめてね, Kaerimiru no Yamete ne)
47. "Could I Pleeease Fire Off a Single Attack for Free?" (何かワザの一つくらい無償で撃てたっていーじゃん, Nani ka Waza no Hitotsu Kurai Mushō de Utetatte Ii jan)
48. "Is That a Long Time?" (それって長いんですか？, Sorette Nagai ndesu ka?)
49. "A Major Dumbass" (すっげーアホ, Suggē Aho)
50. "Where Your Mom Met Her Dragon" (ドラゴンと出会った場所, Doragon to Deatta Basho)
51. "That's Our Job" (俺達の役目です, Oretachi no Yakume Desu)
52. "That's Why the Bureau Exists" (俺達"局"はそのために在る, Oretachi "Kyoku" wa Sono Tame ni Aru)
53. "Do You Remember Going Berserk?" (暴れてる間の記憶ある？, Abareteru Aida no Kioku Aru?)

=== Anime ===
An anime television series adaptation produced by Kyoto Animation was announced on December 28, 2025.

=== Other media ===
Shueisha released a voice comic adaptation of the one-shot in September 2021, and adaptations of the first three chapters in September and October 2022; they feature Chiaki Omigawa as the voice of Ruri Aoki. In July 2022, a set of digital stickers based on the series was released in the instant messaging service Line. A promotional video for the third volume, animated by Coalowl and featuring music by Zutomayo, was released on March 3, 2025.

== Reception ==
By October 2022, RuriDragon had 200,000 copies in circulation; it had over 850,000 copies in circulation (including digital versions) by March 2025, and over 1.1 million copies in circulation by November 2025. The first volume debuted at number seven on Oricon's weekly manga chart, with recorded sales of 74,874 copies; the second volume entered the chart at fourth place with 77,508 copies sold; the third volume debuted at seventh place with 72,514 copies sold; the fourth volume debuted at second place with 56,184 copies sold. The manga ranked first in the "Nationwide Bookstore Employees' Recommended Comics of 2023" survey answered by bookstore clerks in Japan, who described the series as "a warm story that accepts diversity without hesitation". RuriDragon was also nominated in the 2023 eBookJapan Manga Award. The series ranked ninth in the 2024 edition of Takarajimasha's Kono Manga ga Sugoi! list of best manga for male readers, tying with Suna no Miyako. It ranked second in the Web Manga category of the 2024 Next Manga Awards. In 2026, the series won the Daruma for Best Slice of Life Manga and was nominated in the Daruma for Best Manga category at the Japan Expo Awards.

The first chapter received positive reviews from Japanese readers, who found the art "cute" and said that the story's loose atmosphere is not typical of a Jump manga. Brian Salvatore of Multiversity Comics praised the art and tone for approaching the juxtaposition between Ruri and her surroundings in a way that balances comedy and absurdity, adding that the way the story unfolds "seems natural to 'real' life". Mei Chan of Real Sound described RuriDragon as "a book that will make you want to think about the kindness and love of those around you". Writing for GamesRadar+, Austin Wood praised the manga for its "clean art and stellar expressions" and how it approaches its fantasy premise, adding that its setting, pacing, and main character are a stand out within Shōnen Jump's lineup.
