= Suna no Miyako =

Japanese manga series

- Cover of the volume

砂の都
- Genre: Fantasy
- Manga
- Written by: Yō Machida
- Published by: Kodansha
- Imprint: Morning KC
- Magazine: Morning Two
- Original run: September 21, 2018 – May 4, 2023
- Volumes: 1

Suna no Miyako (砂の都) is a Japanese manga series written and illustrated by Yō Machida. It was irregularly serialized on Kodansha's Morning Two manga website from September 2018 to May 2023, with its chapters compiled into a single volume.

== Synopsis ==
The series focuses on stories set on a desert island where buildings are made up of people's memories.

== Publication ==
Written and illustrated by Yō Machida, Suna no Miyako was irregularly serialized on Kodansha's Morning Two website from September 21, 2018 to May 4, 2023. Its chapters were compiled into a single volume that was released on May 23, 2023.

No.	Release date	ISBN
1	May 23, 2023	978-4-06-531737-2

== Reception ==
The series, alongside RuriDragon, was ranked 9th in the 2024 edition of Takarajimasha's Kono Manga ga Sugoi! guidebook for the best manga for male readers.
