= Kudo =

Kudo or KUDO may refer to:

- KOAN (AM), a radio station (1080 AM) in Anchorage, Alaska, United States, which held the call sign KUDO from 2002 to 2013
- Kūdō, a martial art and a combat sport, also called daido juku

== People ==
Kudō (工藤; Kudo, Kudoh, Kudou) is a Japanese family name.

- Kudo (wrestler), Japanese professional wrestler
- Aoi Kudo (工藤 蒼生; born 2000), Japanese footballer
- Atsuo Kudo (工藤 篤緒; born 1965), Japanese ice hockey player
- Chū Kudō (born Tetsusaburō Kudō, 1882–1965), Japanese-born Manchukuo politician and soldier
- Elaine Kudo, ballet dancer
- Haruka Kudo (singer) (born 1999), Japanese pop singer and member of Morning Musume
- Haruka Kudō (voice actress) (born 1989), Japanese voice actor and model
- Hirofumi Kudo (born 1959), Japanese curler, 1998 Winter Olympic participant
- Yui Kudo (born 1999), Japanese gravure idol
- Kazuyoshi Kudo (c. 1937–2007), Japanese yakuza
- Kimihisa Kudo (工藤 公久; born 1939), Japanese ice hockey player
- Kimiyasu Kudō (born 1963), Japanese baseball player
- Kota Kudo (born 2003), Japanese football player
- Mai Kudō (born 1984), Japanese singer
- Masashi Kudō (animator) (工藤 昌史), Japanese animator
- Masashi Kudo (boxer) (工藤 政志; born 1951), Japanese boxer
- Megumi Kudo (born 1969), retired Japanese professional wrestler
- Minako Kudo (1967–2005), better known as Minako Honda, Japanese pop singer
- Seiji Kudo (工藤 誠二; born 1945), Japanese cross-country skier
- Shizuka Kudō (born 1970), Japanese pop singer and former member of Onyanko Club
- Tetsumi Kudo (1935–1990), Japanese artist
- Tori Kudo, Japanese musician and founder of Maher Shalal Hash Baz
- Yasuko Kudo (工藤 恭子; born 1969), Japanese para table tennis player
- Youki Kudoh (born 1971), Japanese actress and singer
- Yusei Kudo (工藤 祐生; born 1986), Japanese footballer
- Yûshun Kudô (1887–1932), Japanese botanist

== Fictional characters ==
- Booker Kudo (or Yūsaku Kudō), character in the manga series Case Closed
- Hajime Kudou, character in the manga and series Kowloon Generic Romance
- Harue Kudou, character in the manga series Gals!
- Himiko Kudou, character in the manga series GetBackers
- Hina Kudo, character in the Korean serial drama Mr. Sunshine
- Jimmy Kudo (or Shinichi Kudō), protagonist of the manga series Case Closed
- Kanae Kudō, character in the visual novel De Capo
- Rei Kudou, character in the Arisa manga series
- Shin Kudo, protagonist of the anime Macross Zero
- Taiki Kudō, protagonist the anime series Digimon Xros Wars
- Toshitsugu Kudou, character in the manga and anime series My Hero Academia
- Vivian Kudo (or Yukiko Kudō), character in the manga series Case Closed
- Yohji Kudou, character in the Weiß Kreuz fictional universe
- Yuichi Kudo, character in the Doki Doki School Hours anime and manga series

== See also ==
- Kudos (disambiguation)
