= Robert B. Westbrook (historian) =

American historian, born 1950

- Born: Robert Brett Westbrook; September 6, 1950 (age 76); Austin, Minnesota, U.S.

Academic background
- Education: Stanford University; Yale University

Academic work
- Discipline: History
- Institutions: Scripps College; Yale University; University of Rochester
- Notable students: Charles J. Shindo, Ian Gordon

Robert Brett Westbrook (born September 6, 1950) is an American historian and Joseph F. Cunningham Professor of History at the University of Rochester.

== Life ==
Robert Westbrook was born and raised in Austin, Minnesota, United States. He graduated from Yale University in 1972, summa cum laude, Phi Beta Kappa, and with exceptional distinction in history. He received his PhD from Stanford University in 1981. Westbrook has taught at Scripps College and Yale University. His first book, a reformulation and expansion of his thesis, John Dewey and American Democracy, is considered the best intellectual biography of the influential pragmatist philosopher. Westbrook has been described by Cheryl Misak as "our best intellectual historian of pragmatism."[2][1]

== Personal life ==
Westbrook is married to Shamra Westbrook.

== Awards ==
- 1993 Merle Curti Award

== Works ==
- "An Innocent Abroad? John Dewey and International Politics", Ethics & International Affairs, Volume 7 (1993)
- Democratic Hope: Pragmatism and the Politics of Truth. Cornell University Press. 2005. ISBN 978-0-8014-2833-3. "Robert Westbrook democratic."
- Why We Fought: Forging American Obligations in World War II, June 2004, HarperCollins, ISBN 978-1-58834-130-3
- John Dewey and American Democracy. Stanford University. 1980. ISBN 978-0-8014-8111-6. (reprint Cornell University Press, 1993, ISBN 978-0-8014-8111-6)

=== Editor ===
- Richard Wightman Fox; Robert B. Westbrook, eds. (2002). In Face of the Facts: Moral Inquiry in American Scholarship. Cambridge University Press. ISBN 978-0-521-62887-7.
