= Kitō (surname) =

Kitō, Kito, Kitou or Kitoh (written: 鬼頭, 紀藤 or 木藤) is a Japanese surname. Notable people with the surname include:

- Akari Kitō (鬼頭 明里, born 1994), Japanese voice actress
- Aya Kitō (木藤 亜也, 1962–1988), Japanese diarist
- En Kitō (鬼頭 えん), Japanese manga artist
- Masaki Kito (紀藤 正樹, born 1960), Japanese lawyer
- Mohiro Kitoh (鬼頭 莫宏, born 1966), Japanese manga artist
