= Joe Muto =

Former employee of Fox News

Joe Muto, known as the "Fox Mole", is a former employee of Fox News known for his leaks of material from the company to Gawker.

Muto, a graduate of University of Notre Dame, started work at Fox as a production assistant in July 2004 and became an associate producer for The O'Reilly Factor, Bill O'Reilly's show, in January 2007.

== "The Fox News Mole" ==
In April 2012, Muto started a column on Gawker, "The Fox News Mole," in which he leaked gossip and unreleased footage from Fox News. According to Muto, he wanted to quit Fox News and work for Gawker, but Gawker staff instead proposed that he remain at Fox and leak material to them. To prove he worked at Fox News, Muto sent Gawker two Fox News outtakes: one was a discussion of horses by Sean Hannity and Mitt Romney, and another was Newt Gingrich having his hair done by his wife. Gawker paid him $5,000 for the material. The outtakes were posted publicly.

According to Muto, he believed that only certain people in the New York City media industry would be interested in his column, but media attention spread nationally and to major news outlets. Fox News staff looked at the login information and found that Muto was the only person to recently access both videos. The company fired him.

== Misdemeanor conviction and aftermath ==
On May 9, Muto pleaded guilty to two misdemeanor charges: "attempted unlawful duplication of computer material" and "attempted criminal possession of computer material". He was sentenced to 200 hours of private community service, ten days of community service ordered by the court, and a fine of $1,000; he also gave up the $5,000 Gawker paid him to the court. Gawker paid for Muto's criminal defense.

As part of his community service Muto cleaned municipal parks, and for his private community service he chose to assist a Brooklyn literacy organization. Muto stated that he "did something very stupid and I suppose it's right that I paid for it." He stated that he would not have leaked the material if he knew he would be criminally prosecuted for it. Gawker editor-in-chief John Cook criticized the sentence, accusing Cyrus Vance Jr., the district attorney of Manhattan, of trying to please Roger Ailes.

Muto wrote the book An Atheist in the FOXhole chronicling his experiences at Fox.
