= Charles J. Shindo =

American historian

Charles Jogi Shindo
- Born: California, United States
- Education: University of Southern California; California State University, Fullerton; University of Rochester
- Known for: Cultural History
- Awards: W. Turrentine Jackson Award (1992); Roselyn Boneno Award for Teaching (2003); Caroline Bancroft Prize (1998)
- Scientific career
- Fields: History
- Workplaces: Louisiana State University
- Doctoral advisor: Robert Westbrook

Charles Jogi Shindo is a Professor of United States history at Louisiana State University.

Dr. Shindo took his BA at the University of Southern California where he undertook a number of majors before settling on history. He then earned a master's degree at California State University, Fullerton. He undertook his Doctor of Philosophy at the University of Rochester. His dissertation, entitled "Voices of the migrant : democracy and culture in the dust bowl works of John Steinbeck, John Ford, and Woody Guthrie" was completed under the direction of historian Robert Westbrook in 1992.

Dr. Shindo's book, Dust Bowl Migrants in the American Imagination challenges the common conception of the Dust Bowl migrant, arguing that a small group of artists perpetuated the stereotype of the downtrodden "Okie" to promote their own reformist agenda, when, in fact, the realities of the migrant worker was quite different.

At LSU, Dr. Shindo's course offerings center on Asian-American, U.S. Cultural, and Post-Civil War history.

== Bibliography ==
- Shindo, Charles J. Dust Bowl Migrants in the American Imagination (Lawrence: University Press of Kansas, 1997)
- Shindo, Charles J. "Myth of the Dust Bowl," Wilson Quarterly, vol. 24, no. 4 (Autumn 2000): 25-30
- Shindo, Charles J. 1927 and the Rise of Modern America (Lawrence: University Press of Kansas, 2010)

== Awards ==
- W. Turrentine Jackson Award of the Pacific Coast Branch of the American Historical Association (1992).
- Roselyn Boneno Award for Teaching - Louisiana State University and Agricultural and Mechanical College (2003)
- Caroline Bancroft Prize, Western History Department, Denver Public Library (1998)
