= Masaoki Shindo =

Japanese manga artist (born 1998)

Masaoki Shindo 眞藤 雅興
- Born: August 3, 1998 (age 28)
- Area: Manga artist
- Notable works: RuriDragon

Masaoki Shindo (Japanese: 眞藤 雅興, Hepburn: Shindō Masaoki; born August 3, 1998) is a Japanese manga artist from Kagoshima Prefecture. They debuted in 2016 after winning the Grand Treasure Award for their one-shot Twin Peach. Shindo is known for creating the manga series RuriDragon, which began its serialization in Shueisha's Weekly Shōnen Jump magazine in June 2022.

== Career ==
Shindo's one-shot, Twin Peach, was the first manuscript they presented, and it was submitted for the 109th Jump Treasure Newcomer Manga Award. Their editor, Naitō, first encountered the one-shot in June 2016 and have noted the author's "solid drawing skills and brushwork". Twin Peach received an honorable mention at the award ceremony that year and also won the Grand Treasure Award. It was published in Shueisha's special Jump Cross issue in December 2016, along with their second one-shot Sky Claw. In September 2017, Shindo's next one-shot, Joreishi Rentarō no Yakusoku, was published in Shueisha's Weekly Shōnen Jump magazine as an entry for the 12th Gold Future Cup. Da Vinci described the one-shot as "highly polished" and noted that it received praise from readers for its art and characters. It was announced as the grand prize winner in December 2017 after being decided through reader vote. Count Over, their fourth one-shot, was published in Weekly Shōnen Jump in May 2018; its story and art were similarly praised by readers.

In December 2020, Shindo released the one-shot RuriDragon in the magazine Jump Giga. Due to favorable reception, the one-shot was turned into a serialization that started in Weekly Shōnen Jump in June 2022. The series went into an indefinite hiatus in August 2022 due to Shindo's health. It resumed its serialization in March 2024 and was moved to Weekly Shōnen Jump's digital version and the Shōnen Jump+ platform in April, changing to a biweekly release schedule. RuriDragon ranked first in the 2023 Nationwide Bookstore Employees' Recommended Comics survey answered by bookstore clerks in Japan, and placed second in the Web Manga category of the 2024 Next Manga Awards.

Shindo provided the character designs and concept art for the 2023 roguelike adventure video game Arcarna of Paradise: The Tower. They were involved in the game's production since July 2021 and had finished their work prior to the serialization of RuriDragon. They also were a staff member on Eiichiro Oda's manga series One Piece. Naitō said that the series had a "heavy influence" on Twin Peach.

== Works ==
=== Serializations ===
- RuriDragon (ルリドラゴン, Ruridoragon) (2022–present) – serialized in Weekly Shōnen Jump (2022–present) and Shōnen Jump+ (2024–present); published by Shueisha in five tankōbon volumes

=== One-shots ===
- Twin Peach (2016) – published in Jump Cross
- Sky Claw (2016) – published in Jump Cross
- Joreishi Rentarō no Yakusoku (除冷師 煉太郎の約束; 'The Oath of Ice Slayer Rentaro') (2017) – published in Weekly Shōnen Jump
- Count Over (2018) – published in Weekly Shōnen Jump
- RuriDragon (ルリドラゴン, Ruridoragon) (2020) – published in Jump Giga

=== Others ===
- Arcarna of Paradise: The Tower (ハテナの塔 -The Tower of Children-, Hatena no Tō: The Tower of Children) (video game, 2023) – character design, concept art
