= Nathaniel Makoto Uematsu =

Japanese Anglican bishop

The Most Reverend Nathaniel Makoto Uematsu
- Primate of the Nippon Sei Ko Kai, Bishop of Hokkaido
- Church: Nippon Sei Ko Kai
- Diocese: Diocese of Hokkaido
- In office: 2006–2020
- Successor: Luke Kenichi Muto

Orders
- Ordination: 1984
- Consecration: 1997

Personal details
- Born: 1952 (age 73–74)
- Denomination: Anglican

Nathaniel Makoto Uematsu (植松 誠 ナタナエル) is a Japanese Anglican bishop. He was the bishop of the diocese of Hokkaidō, Japan, from 1997 to 2022, and was the primate of the Nippon Sei Ko Kai, the province of the Anglican Communion in Japan, from 2006 to 2020.

Uematsu became primate on 23 May 2006 having previously worked as a curate at St. Mark's in Ashiya, Osaka, as rector at Holy Trinity in the same city, and as general secretary of the Provincial Office of the Nippon Sei Ko Kai.

Uematsu is a 1982 master of divinity graduate of the Episcopal Theological Seminary of the Southwest in Austin, Texas.
