= Luke Kenichi Muto =

Japanese Anglican bishop

The Most Reverend Luke Ken-ichi Muto
- Bishop of Kyushu
- Native name: ルカ武藤謙一
- Province: Anglican Church in Japan
- Diocese: Kyushu
- In office: 2013–present
- Predecessor: Gabriel Shoji Igarashi
- Other post: Primate of Nippon Sei Ko Kai (2020–2024)

Orders
- Consecration: 1 December 2012 by Nathaniel Makoto Uematsu

Luke Kenichi Muto (Japanese: ルカ 武藤 謙一, Ruka Muto Kenichi) is a Japanese Anglican bishop. Since 2013, he has been bishop of Kyushu, and from 2020 to 2024, he was the 19th primate of the Nippon Sei Ko Kai, the province of the Anglican Communion in Japan.

Muto was elected as primate during an online synod due to COVID-19 restrictions in October 2020 and installed during a small service on November 5, 2020.

During his tenure, in 2022, Muto consecrated Maria Grace Tazu Sasamori as bishop of Hokkaido. Sasamori was the first female Anglican bishop in east Asia.

== See also ==
- Anglican Church in Japan
- Anglican Communion

Anglican Communion titles
Preceded by Nathaniel Makoto Uematsu	Primate of the Nippon Sei Ko Kai; 2020–2024	Succeeded by David Eisho Uehara
Preceded by Gabriel Shoji Igarashi	Bishop of Kyushu; 2013–present	Incumbent
