= Muranaka =

Muranaka (written: 村中 lit. "village center") is a Japanese surname. Notable people with the surname include:

- Kyohei Muranaka (村中 恭兵, born 1987), Japanese baseball player
- Rika Muranaka, Japanese composer
- Riko Muranaka (村中 璃子), Japanese physician and journalist
- Shūji Muranaka (村中 秀史, born 1981), Japanese shogi player
- Suguru Muranaka (村中 優, born 1985), Japanese boxer
- Takaji Muranaka (村中 孝次, 1903–1937), Imperial Japanese Army officer
- Tomo Muranaka (村中 知, born 1989), Japanese voice actress
